= 2009 Sicilia Classic Mancuso Company Cup – Singles =

Singles
- 2009 Sicilia Classic Mancuso Company Cup

Final
- Champion: (Romania) Adrian Ungur
- Runner-up: (Spain) Albert Ramos-Viñolas
- Score: 6–4, 6–4

Events
Singles	Doubles
← 2008 ·	Sicilia Classic Mancuso Company Cup	· 2010 →

Adrian Ungur became the first champion of this event, after won against Albert Ramos-Viñolas 6–4, 6–4 in the final.

== Seeds ==
1. (Australia) Carsten Ball (first round)
2. (South Africa) ~~Kevin Anderson~~ (withdrew due to a right peroneus injury)
3. (Spain) Iván Navarro (quarterfinals)
4. (Israel) Harel Levy (first round)
5. (Belgium) ~~Xavier Malisse~~ (withdrew)
6. (Italy) Flavio Cipolla (second round, retired)
7. (Austria) Martin Fischer (first round)
8. (Italy) Flavio Cipolla (first round)

== Draw ==
=== Key ===
- Q = Qualifier
- WC = Wild card
- LL = Lucky loser
- Alt = Alternate
- SE = Special exempt
- PR = Protected ranking
- ITF = ITF entry
- JE = Junior exempt
- w/o = Walkover
- r = Retired
- d = Defaulted
- SR = Special ranking

=== Final four ===
Semifinals
(Spain) Albert Ramos-Viñolas	6	6
(Serbia) Nikola Ćirić	4	4
SE	(Romania) Adrian Ungur	0	6	6
(Spain) Miguel Ángel López Jaén	6	6^{3}	3

Final
(Spain) Albert Ramos-Viñolas	4	4
SE	(Romania) Adrian Ungur	6	6

=== Top half ===
First round
1	(Australia) C Ball	4	2
(Spain) A Ramos-Viñolas	6	6
WC	(Italy) A Comporto	6	6
(Spain) P Santos	3	4
Q	(Morocco) R El Amrani	4	6	6
(Austria) P Oswald	6	4	2
(Spain) G Olaso	6	6
LL	(Italy) W Trusendi	4	4
4	(Israel) H Levy	4	6	6^{1}
(Serbia) N Ćirić	6	4	7
Q	(Netherlands) A van der Duim	6	7
WC	(Italy) F Aldi	3	6^{3}
(Spain) J Checa-Calvo	6	3	6^{3}
Q	(Germany) G Kretschmer	4	6	7
WC	(Italy) A Cammarata	2	1
6	(Italy) F Cipolla	6	6

Second round
(Spain) A Ramos-Viñolas	6	6
WC	(Italy) A Comporto	3	2
Q	(Morocco) R El Amrani	2	2
(Spain) G Olaso	6	6
(Serbia) N Ćirić	7	4	6
Q	(Netherlands) A van der Duim	6^{7}	6	3
Q	(Germany) G Kretschmer	2
6	(Italy) F Cipolla	0	r

Quarterfinals
(Spain) A Ramos-Viñolas	6	6^{4}	6
(Spain) G Olaso	3	7	4
(Serbia) N Ćirić	4	6	6
Q	(Germany) G Kretschmer	6	2	3

Semifinals
(Spain) A Ramos-Viñolas	6	6
(Serbia) N Ćirić	4	4

=== Bottom half ===
First round
8	(Italy) A di Mauro	3	2
SE	(Romania) A Ungur	6	6
Q	(Spain) S Gutiérrez-Ferrol	6	5	6
(Brazil) R Dutra da Silva	2	7	4
(Serbia) B Pašanski	7	6
(Netherlands) I Sijsling	6^{5}	1
(Germany) A Flock	4	4
3	(Spain) I Navarro	6	6
7	(Austria) M Fischer	2	6	3
(Spain) G Trujillo-Soler	6	3	6
(Canada) P-L Duclos	2	2
(Spain) MÁ López Jaén	6	6
(Belgium) D Goffin	6	6
WC	(Russia) A Kuznetsov	3	4
(Spain) I Cervantes-Huegun	6^{5}	6	6
LL	(United States) K Van't Hof	7	3	2

Second round
SE	(Romania) A Ungur	7	6
Q	(Spain) S Gutiérrez-Ferrol	6^{3}	2
(Serbia) B Pašanski	3	4
3	(Spain) I Navarro	6	6
(Spain) G Trujillo-Soler	6	3	2
(Spain) MÁ López Jaén	1	6	6
(Belgium) D Goffin	6	4	2
(Spain) I Cervantes-Huegun	1	6	6

Quarterfinals
SE	(Romania) A Ungur	7	1	7
3	(Spain) I Navarro	6^{7}	6	5
(Spain) MÁ López Jaén	6	2	6
(Spain) I Cervantes-Huegun	4	6	2

Semifinals
SE	(Romania) A Ungur	0	7	6
(Spain) MÁ López Jaén	6	6^{3}	3
