= 2010 Austrian Open Kitzbühel – Doubles =

Doubles
- 2010 Austrian Open Kitzbühel

Final
- Champions: (Jamaica) Dustin Brown (Netherlands) Rogier Wassen
- Runners-up: (Chile) Hans Podlipnik-Castillo (Austria) Max Raditschnigg
- Score: 3–6, 7–5, [10–7]

Details
- Draw: 16
- Seeds: 4

Events
Singles	Doubles
- Austrian Open Kitzbühel

André Sá and Marcelo Melo won in the doubles competition in 2009, when the tournament was part of the ATP World Tour 250 series, but did not participate this year.
Dustin Brown and Rogier Wassen defeated Hans Podlipnik-Castillo and Max Raditschnigg 3–6, 7–5, [10–7] in the final.

== Seeds ==
1. (Germany) Philipp Marx / (Slovakia) Igor Zelenay (semifinals)
2. (Poland) Tomasz Bednarek / (Czech Republic) David Škoch (first round)
3. (South Africa) Jeff Coetzee / (United Kingdom) Jamie Murray (semifinals)
4. (Jamaica) Dustin Brown / (Netherlands) Rogier Wassen (champions)

== Draw ==
Key

- Q = Qualifier
- WC = Wild card
- LL = Lucky loser
- Alt = Alternate
- ITF = ITF entry
- PR = Protected ranking
- SR = Special ranking
- SE = Special exempt
- JE = Junior exempt
- JR = Junior Accelerator Programme entrant
- CO = College Accelerator Programme entrant
- NG = Next Gen Accelerator Program entrant
- w/o = Walkover
- r = Retired
- d = Defaulted

=== Draw ===
First round
1	(Germany) P Marx (Slovakia) I Zelenay	6^{11}	7	[10]
(Poland) M Kowalczyk (Poland) G Panfil	7	5	[5]
(Spain) P Andújar (France) A Sidorenko	w/o
WC	(Austria) M Fischer (Austria) T Muster
4	(Jamaica) D Brown (Netherlands) R Wassen	6	6
(Germany) D Blömke (Australia) J Lemke	3	4
(France) J Eysseric (France) O Patience	7	6
(Uzbekistan) F Dustov (Austria) B Steinberger	5	1
(Romania) V Crivoi (Austria) A Haider-Maurer	6^{9}	3
(Austria) R Eitzinger (Austria) P Oswald	7	6
WC	(Austria) G Melzer (Austria) T-S Weissborn	3	6	[5]
3	(South Africa) J Coetzee (United Kingdom) J Murray	6	4	[10]
(Slovakia) D Hrbatý (Czech Republic) L Rosol	6	6
WC	(Germany) N Lampe (Honduras) J Moncada	2	2
(Chile) H Podlipnik-Castillo (Austria) M Raditschnigg	6	6
2	(Poland) T Bednarek (Czech Republic) D Škoch	4	4

Quarterfinals
1	(Germany) P Marx (Slovakia) I Zelenay	6	6
WC	(Austria) M Fischer (Austria) T Muster	2	3
4	(Jamaica) D Brown (Netherlands) R Wassen	6	6
(France) J Eysseric (France) O Patience	1	2
(Austria) R Eitzinger (Austria) P Oswald	1	0
3	(South Africa) J Coetzee (United Kingdom) J Murray	6	6
(Slovakia) D Hrbatý (Czech Republic) L Rosol	6^{3}	0
(Chile) H Podlipnik-Castillo (Austria) M Raditschnigg	7	6

Semifinals
1	(Germany) P Marx (Slovakia) I Zelenay	7	4	[8]
4	(Jamaica) D Brown (Netherlands) R Wassen	5	6	[10]
3	(South Africa) J Coetzee (United Kingdom) J Murray	5	3
(Chile) H Podlipnik-Castillo (Austria) M Raditschnigg	7	6

Finals
4	(Jamaica) D Brown (Netherlands) R Wassen	3	7	[10]
(Chile) H Podlipnik-Castillo (Austria) M Raditschnigg	6	5	[7]
