= 2011 Sicilia Classic – Doubles =

Doubles
- 2011 Sicilia Classic

Final
- Champions: (Poland) Tomasz Bednarek (Poland) Mateusz Kowalczyk
- Runners-up: (Belarus) Alexander Bury (Belarus) Andrei Vasilevski
- Score: 6–2, 6–4

Events
Singles	Doubles
← 2010 ·	Sicilia Classic	· 2012 →

Martin Fischer and Philipp Oswald were the defending champions, but decided not to participate.
Tomasz Bednarek and Mateusz Kowalczyk won this tournament by defeating Alexander Bury and Andrei Vasilevski 6–2, 6–4 in the final.

== Seeds ==
1. (Spain) David Marrero / (Spain) Pere Riba (first round)
2. (France) Olivier Charroin / (France) Stéphane Robert (first round)
3. (Italy) Alessio di Mauro / (Italy) Alessandro Motti (quarterfinals)
4. (Poland) Tomasz Bednarek / (Poland) Mateusz Kowalczyk (champions)

== Draw ==
=== Key ===
- Q = Qualifier
- WC = Wild card
- LL = Lucky loser
- Alt = Alternate
- SE = Special exempt
- PR = Protected ranking
- ITF = ITF entry
- JE = Junior exempt
- w/o = Walkover
- r = Retired
- d = Defaulted
- SR = Special ranking

=== Draw ===
First round
1	(Spain) D Marrero (Spain) P Riba	3	3
(Belarus) A Bury (Belarus) A Vasilevski	6	6
(Argentina) D Junqueira (Argentina) A Molteni	3	3
(Spain) P Carreño-Busta (Spain) D Muñoz-de la Nava	6	6
3	(Italy) A di Mauro (Italy) A Motti	3	6	[10]
(Slovakia) P Červenák (Serbia) N Ćirić	6	1	[7]
(Chinese Taipei) C-p Hsieh (Chinese Taipei) H-h Lee	6	5	[10]
WC	(Italy) Omar Giacalone (Italy) G Naso	4	7	[5]
(India) P Raja (Italy) W Trusendi	6	6
WC	(Italy) F Aldi (Italy) Marco Cecchinato	1	4
WC	(Italy) Antonio Comporto (Italy) D Giorgini	4	0
4	(Poland) T Bednarek (Poland) M Kowalczyk	6	6
(Italy) A Giannessi (Italy) S Vagnozzi	2	3
(Kazakhstan) Y Schukin (Croatia) A Veić	6	6
(Slovenia) B Kavčič (Czech Republic) J Pospíšil	6	6
2	(France) O Charroin (France) S Robert	4	4

Quarterfinals
(Belarus) A Bury (Belarus) A Vasilevski	w/o
(Spain) P Carreño-Busta (Spain) D Muñoz-de la Nava
3	(Italy) A di Mauro (Italy) A Motti	1	7^{7}	[9]
(Chinese Taipei) C-p Hsieh (Chinese Taipei) H-h Lee	6	6^{3}	[11]
(India) P Raja (Italy) W Trusendi	4	6^{5}
4	(Poland) T Bednarek (Poland) M Kowalczyk	6	7^{7}
(Kazakhstan) Y Schukin (Croatia) A Veić	4	5
(Slovenia) B Kavčič (Czech Republic) J Pospíšil	6	7

Semifinals
(Belarus) A Bury (Belarus) A Vasilevski	6^{7}	7	[10]
(Chinese Taipei) C-p Hsieh (Chinese Taipei) H-h Lee	7^{9}	5	[8]
4	(Poland) T Bednarek (Poland) M Kowalczyk	4	7	[10]
(Slovenia) B Kavčič (Czech Republic) J Pospíšil	6	5	[5]

Final
(Belarus) A Bury (Belarus) A Vasilevski	2	4
4	(Poland) T Bednarek (Poland) M Kowalczyk	6	6
