= 2010 Sicilia Classic =

- Date: 4–10 October
- Edition: 2nd
- Location: Palermo, Italy

Champions

Singles
- (Hungary) Attila Balázs

Doubles
- (Austria) Martin Fischer / (Austria) Philipp Oswald
← 2009 ·	Sicilia Classic	· 2011 →

The 2010 Sicilia Classic was a professional tennis tournament played on outdoor red clay courts. It was the second edition of the tournament which was part of the 2010 ATP Challenger Tour. It took place in Palermo, Italy between 4 and 10 October 2010.

== ATP entrants ==
=== Seeds ===
Country	Player	Rank^{1}	Seed
ITA	Filippo Volandri	98	1
ITA	Simone Bolelli	117	2
KAZ	Yuri Schukin	125	3
AUT	Martin Fischer	138	4
ITA	Alessio di Mauro	158	5
ROU	Adrian Ungur	159	6
FRA	Éric Prodon	160	7
MAR	Reda El Amrani	164	8

- Rankings are as of 27 September 2010.

=== Other entrants ===
The following players received wildcards into the singles main draw:

- (Italy) Francesco Aldi
- (Italy) Simone Bolelli
- (Italy) Marco Cecchinato
- (Austria) Thomas Muster

The following players received a special entrant into the singles main draw:

- (Serbia) Boris Pašanski

The following players received entry from the qualifying draw:

- (France) Nicolas Devilder
- (Italy) Alessandro Giannessi
- (Italy) Gianluca Naso
- (Italy) Walter Trusendi

== Champions ==
=== Singles ===
(Hungary) Attila Balázs def. (Austria) Martin Fischer, 7–6(4), 2–6, 6–1

=== Doubles ===
(Austria) Martin Fischer / (Austria) Philipp Oswald def. (Italy) Alessandro Motti / (Italy) Simone Vagnozzi, 4–6, 6–2, [10–6]
