= 2009 Sicilia Classic Mancuso Company Cup – Doubles =

Doubles
- 2009 Sicilia Classic Mancuso Company Cup

Final
- Champions: (Austria) Martin Fischer (Austria) Philipp Oswald
- Runners-up: (Canada) Pierre-Ludovic Duclos (Brazil) Rogério Dutra da Silva
- Score: 4–6, 6–3, [10–5]

Events
| Singles | Doubles |
| ← 2008 · | Sicilia Classic Mancuso Company Cup | · 2010 → |

Austrian pair Martin Fischer and Philipp Oswald won this tournament, by defeating fourth-seeded Pierre-Ludovic Duclos and Rogério Dutra da Silva 4–6, 6–3, [10–5] in the final match.

== Seeds ==
1. (Australia) Carsten Ball / (United States) Kaes Van't Hof (first round)
2. (Israel) Amir Hadad / (Israel) Harel Levy (first round)
3. (South Africa) Kevin Anderson / (India) Harsh Mankad (first round)
4. (Canada) Pierre-Ludovic Duclos / (Brazil) Rogério Dutra da Silva (final)

== Draw ==
=== Key ===
- Q = Qualifier
- WC = Wild card
- LL = Lucky loser
- Alt = Alternate
- SE = Special exempt
- PR = Protected ranking
- ITF = ITF entry
- JE = Junior exempt
- w/o = Walkover
- r = Retired
- d = Defaulted
- SR = Special ranking

=== Draw ===
First round
1 | (Australia) C Ball (United States) K Van't Hof | 4 | 1
(Austria) M Fischer (Austria) P Oswald | 6 | 6
(Spain) S Gutiérrez-Ferrol (Spain) A Ramos-Viñolas | 6 | 1 | [2]
WC | (Italy) A Cammarata (Italy) C Fortuna | 1 | 6 | [10]
3 | (South Africa) K Anderson (India) H Mankad | 6 | 4 | [7]
(Spain) I Cervantes-Huegun (Spain) G Olaso | 3 | 6 | [10]
WC | (Serbia) N Ćirić (Serbia) B Pašanski | 6 | 6
(Spain) J Checa-Calvo (Spain) P Santos | 1 | 3
(Italy) F Cipolla (Italy) W Trusendi | 1 | 6 | [10]
(United States) B Battistone (United States) D Battistone | 6 | 4 | [6]
WC | (Italy) F Aldi (Italy) A Comporto | 4 | 4
4 | (Canada) P-L Duclos (Brazil) R Dutra da Silva | 6 | 6
(Netherlands) A van der Duim (Netherlands) B Westerhof | 6^{6} | 6 | [7]
(Spain) MÁ López Jaén (Spain) I Navarro | 7 | 3 | [10]
(Netherlands) I Sijsling (Spain) B Trujillo-Soler | 6 | 7
2 | (Israel) A Hadad (Israel) H Levy | 1 | 6^{4}

Quarterfinals
(Austria) M Fischer (Austria) P Oswald | 6 | 6
WC | (Italy) A Cammarata (Italy) C Fortuna | 2 | 1
(Spain) I Cervantes-Huegun (Spain) G Olaso | 6^{5} | 1
WC | (Serbia) N Ćirić (Serbia) B Pašanski | 7 | 6
(Italy) F Cipolla (Italy) W Trusendi | w/o
4 | (Canada) P-L Duclos (Brazil) R Dutra da Silva
(Spain) MÁ López Jaén (Spain) I Navarro | 6^{5} | 2
(Netherlands) I Sijsling (Spain) B Trujillo-Soler | 7 | 6

Semifinals
(Austria) M Fischer (Austria) P Oswald | 6 | 6
WC | (Serbia) N Ćirić (Serbia) B Pašanski | 2 | 3
4 | (Canada) P-L Duclos (Brazil) R Dutra da Silva | 5 | 6 | [10]
(Netherlands) I Sijsling (Spain) B Trujillo-Soler | 7 | 3 | [5]

Finals
(Austria) M Fischer (Austria) P Oswald | 6 | 7
4 | (Canada) P-L Duclos (Brazil) R Dutra da Silva | 3 | 6^{4}
