= 2005 Austrian Open – Doubles =

Doubles
- 2005 Austrian Open

Final
- Champions: (Czech Republic) Leoš Friedl (Romania) Andrei Pavel
- Runners-up: (Belgium) Christophe Rochus (Belgium) Olivier Rochus
- Score: 6–2, 6–7^{(5–7)}, 6–0

Details
- Draw: 16
- Seeds: 4

Events
Singles	Doubles
- Austrian Open Kitzbühel

František Čermák and Leoš Friedl were the defending champions, but Čermák did not compete this year. Friedl teamed up with Andrei Pavel and successfully defended his title, by defeating Christophe Rochus and Olivier Rochus 6–2, 6–7^{(5–7)}, 6–0 in the final.

== Seeds ==
1. (India) Mahesh Bhupathi / (Czech Republic) Martin Damm (first round)
2. (Czech Republic) Cyril Suk / (Czech Republic) Pavel Vízner (quarterfinals)
3. (Chile) Fernando González / (Chile) Nicolás Massú (quarterfinals, withdrew due to a shoulder tendinitis on González)
4. (Czech Republic) Leoš Friedl / (Romania) Andrei Pavel (champions)

== Draw ==
Key

- Q = Qualifier
- WC = Wild card
- LL = Lucky loser
- Alt = Alternate
- ITF = ITF entry
- PR = Protected ranking
- SR = Special ranking
- SE = Special exempt
- JE = Junior exempt
- JR = Junior Accelerator Programme entrant
- CO = College Accelerator Programme entrant
- NG = Next Gen Accelerator Program entrant
- w/o = Walkover
- r = Retired
- d = Defaulted

=== Draw ===
First round
1	(India) M Bhupathi (Czech Republic) M Damm	4	6^{0}
(Argentina) J Acasuso (Argentina) S Prieto	6	7^{7}
(Argentina) L Arnold Ker (Argentina) M Puerta	6	6
(Austria) J Knowle (Austria) J Melzer	3	4
4	(Czech Republic) L Friedl (Romania) A Pavel	6	6
(Czech Republic) T Cibulec (Czech Republic) J Levinský	4	2
WC	(Germany) P Kohlschreiber (Austria) S Koubek	6	7
WC	(Austria) M Raditschnigg (Austria) P Schmölzer	1	5
(Italy) E Artoni (Sweden) R Lindstedt	4	6	7
(Argentina) J Mónaco (Spain) F Verdasco	6	4	5
(Switzerland) Y Allegro (Germany) R Schüttler	2	7	4
3	(Chile) F González (Chile) N Massú	6	5	6
(South Africa) J Coetzee (South Africa) C Haggard	4	1
(Belgium) C Rochus (Belgium) O Rochus	6	6
(Argentina) M García (Argentina) M Hood	2	7^{7}	5
2	(Czech Republic) C Suk (Czech Republic) P Vízner	6	6^{5}	7

Quarterfinals
(Argentina) J Acasuso (Argentina) S Prieto	3	2
(Argentina) L Arnold Ker (Argentina) M Puerta	6	6
4	(Czech Republic) L Friedl (Romania) A Pavel	6	6
WC	(Germany) P Kohlschreiber (Austria) S Koubek	4	1
(Italy) E Artoni (Sweden) R Lindstedt	w/o
3	(Chile) F González (Chile) N Massú
(Belgium) C Rochus (Belgium) O Rochus	1	6	6
2	(Czech Republic) C Suk (Czech Republic) P Vízner	6	4	3

Semifinals
(Argentina) L Arnold Ker (Argentina) M Puerta	2	4
4	(Czech Republic) L Friedl (Romania) A Pavel	6	6
(Italy) E Artoni (Sweden) R Lindstedt	6	5	3
(Belgium) C Rochus (Belgium) O Rochus	2	7	6

Final
4	(Czech Republic) L Friedl (Romania) A Pavel	6	6^{5}	6
(Belgium) C Rochus (Belgium) O Rochus	2	7^{7}	0
