= 2006 Austrian Open – Doubles =

Doubles
- 2006 Austrian Open

Final
- Champions: (Germany) Philipp Kohlschreiber (Austria) Stefan Koubek
- Runners-up: (Austria) Oliver Marach (Czech Republic) Cyril Suk
- Score: 6–2, 6–3

Details
- Draw: 16
- Seeds: 4

Events
Singles	Doubles
- Austrian Open

Leoš Friedl and Andrei Pavel were the defending champions, but chose not to participate together. Friedl played alongside František Čermák, but lost in the first round to Juan Ignacio Chela and Luis Horna. Pavel teamed up with Rogier Wassen, but lost in the first round to Tomáš Cibulec and Łukasz Kubot.

Philipp Kohlschreiber and Stefan Koubek won the title, defeating Oliver Marach and Cyril Suk in the final, 6–2, 6–3.

== Seeds ==
1. (Poland) Mariusz Fyrstenberg / (Poland) Marcin Matkowski (first round)
2. (Austria) Julian Knowle / (Austria) Jürgen Melzer (semifinals)
3. (Czech Republic) František Čermák / (Czech Republic) Leoš Friedl (first round)
4. (Czech Republic) Martin Damm / (Czech Republic) Petr Pála (semifinals)

== Draw ==
Key

- Q = Qualifier
- WC = Wild card
- LL = Lucky loser
- Alt = Alternate
- ITF = ITF entry
- PR = Protected ranking
- SR = Special ranking
- SE = Special exempt
- JE = Junior exempt
- JR = Junior Accelerator Programme entrant
- CO = College Accelerator Programme entrant
- NG = Next Gen Accelerator Program entrant
- w/o = Walkover
- r = Retired
- d = Defaulted

First round
1	(Poland) M Fyrstenberg (Poland) M Matkowski	2	4
(Austria) O Marach (Czech Republic) C Suk	6	6
(Romania) A Pavel (Netherlands) R Wassen	3	2
(Czech Republic) T Cibulec (Poland) Ł Kubot	6	6
4	(Czech Republic) M Damm (Czech Republic) P Pála	6	6
WC	(Austria) M Fischer (Austria) P Oswald	2	4
(Belgium) C Rochus (Italy) A Seppi	4	1
(Germany) R Schüttler (Russia) M Youzhny	6	6
WC	(Germany) P Kohlschreiber (Austria) S Koubek	6	3	[10]
(India) M Bhupathi (South Africa) C Haggard	4	6	[5]
(Argentina) JI Chela (Peru) L Horna	6	2	[10]
3	(Czech Republic) F Čermák (Czech Republic) L Friedl	3	6	[8]
(Argentina) A Calleri (Chile) N Massú	6	6
(Argentina) M García (Argentina) S Prieto	4	2
(Switzerland) Y Allegro (Sweden) R Lindstedt	6	6^{3}	[7]
2	(Austria) J Knowle (Austria) J Melzer	4	7^{7}	[10]

Quarterfinals
(Austria) O Marach (Czech Republic) C Suk	4	6	[12]
(Czech Republic) T Cibulec (Poland) Ł Kubot	6	3	[10]
4	(Czech Republic) M Damm (Czech Republic) P Pála	w/o
(Germany) R Schüttler (Russia) M Youzhny
WC	(Germany) P Kohlschreiber (Austria) S Koubek	6	7
(Argentina) JI Chela (Peru) L Horna	2	5
(Argentina) A Calleri (Chile) N Massú
2	(Austria) J Knowle (Austria) J Melzer	w/o

Semifinals
(Austria) O Marach (Czech Republic) C Suk	7^{9}	6
4	(Czech Republic) M Damm (Czech Republic) P Pála	6^{7}	4
WC	(Germany) P Kohlschreiber (Austria) S Koubek	6	7
2	(Austria) J Knowle (Austria) J Melzer	4	5

Final
(Austria) O Marach (Czech Republic) C Suk	2	3
WC	(Germany) P Kohlschreiber (Austria) S Koubek	6	6
