= 2010 Sicilia Classic – Doubles =

Doubles
- 2010 Sicilia Classic

Final
- Champion: (Austria) Martin Fischer (Austria) Philipp Oswald
- Runner-up: (Italy) Alessandro Motti (Italy) Simone Vagnozzi
- Score: 4–6, 6–2, [10–6]

Events
Singles	Doubles
← 2009 ·	Sicilia Classic	· 2011 →

Martin Fischer and Philipp Oswald successfully defended their 2009 title, after win against Alessandro Motti and Simone Vagnozzi 4–6, 6–2, [10–6] in the final.

== Seeds ==
1. (Austria) Martin Fischer / (Austria) Philipp Oswald (champions)
2. (Italy) Alessandro Motti / (Italy) Simone Vagnozzi (final)
3. (Australia) Sadik Kadir / (India) Purav Raja (first round)
4. (Italy) Flavio Cipolla / (Italy) Alessio di Mauro (semifinals)

== Draw ==
=== Key ===
- Q = Qualifier
- WC = Wild card
- LL = Lucky loser
- Alt = Alternate
- SE = Special exempt
- PR = Protected ranking
- ITF = ITF entry
- JE = Junior exempt
- w/o = Walkover
- r = Retired
- d = Defaulted
- SR = Special ranking

=== Draw ===
First round
1	(Austria) M Fischer (Austria) P Oswald	7	6
(Croatia) N Mektić (Croatia) I Zovko	6^{3}	3
(France) A Gensse (France) É Prodon	w/o
(Hungary) A Balázs (Israel) A Hadad
4	(Italy) F Cipolla (Italy) A di Mauro	6	6
WC	(Italy) M Cecchinato (Italy) C Fortuna	3	2
(Germany) B Knittel (Croatia) A Veić	6	6^{7}	[13]
(Brazil) A Ghem (Austria) B Steinberger	3	7	[11]
(Czech Republic) D Karol (Czech Republic) I Minář	6	6
WC	(Italy) A Cammarata (Italy) O Giacalone	3	2
(Italy) A Giannessi (Italy) W Trusendi	7	7
3	(Australia) S Kadir (India) P Raja	5	5
WC	(Italy) G Naso (Italy) A Seidita	7	3	[10]
(Romania) M Copil (Morocco) R El Amrani	6^{5}	6	[12]
(Russia) A Kumantsov (Russia) A Zhurbin	w/o
2	(Italy) A Motti (Italy) S Vagnozzi

Quarterfinals
1	(Austria) M Fischer (Austria) P Oswald	2	6	[10]
(Hungary) A Balázs (Israel) A Hadad	6	4	[5]
4	(Italy) F Cipolla (Italy) A di Mauro
(Germany) B Knittel (Croatia) A Veić	w/o
(Czech Republic) D Karol (Czech Republic) I Minář	7	1	[9]
(Italy) A Giannessi (Italy) W Trusendi	5	6	[11]
(Romania) M Copil (Morocco) R El Amrani	2	6^{0}
2	(Italy) A Motti (Italy) S Vagnozzi	6	7

Semifinals
1	(Austria) M Fischer (Austria) P Oswald	4	6	[10]
4	(Italy) F Cipolla (Italy) A di Mauro	6	1	[5]
(Italy) A Giannessi (Italy) W Trusendi	6^{5}	6	[9]
2	(Italy) A Motti (Italy) S Vagnozzi	7	4	[11]

Finals
1	(Austria) M Fischer (Austria) P Oswald	4	6	[10]
2	(Italy) A Motti (Italy) S Vagnozzi	6	2	[6]
