= 2006 Austrian Open – Singles =

Singles
- 2006 Austrian Open

Final
- Champion: (Argentina) Agustín Calleri
- Runner-up: (Argentina) Juan Ignacio Chela
- Score: 7–6^{(11–9)}, 6–2, 6–3

Details
- Draw: 48
- Seeds: 16

Events
Singles	Doubles
- Austrian Open

Gastón Gaudio was the defending champion, but lost in the quarterfinals to Agustín Calleri.

Nonth-seeded Calleri went on to win the title, defeating Juan Ignacio Chela 7–6^{(11–9)}, 6–2, 6–3 in the final.

== Seeds ==
1. (Russia) Nikolay Davydenko (second round)
2. (Spain) Tommy Robredo (second round)
3. (Finland) Jarkko Nieminen (third round)
4. (Argentina) Gastón Gaudio (quarterfinals)
5. (Spain) Fernando Verdasco (semifinals)
6. (Chile) Nicolás Massú (third round)
7. (Argentina) Juan Ignacio Chela (final)
8. (Russia) Mikhail Youzhny (semifinals)
9. (Argentina) Agustín Calleri (champion)
10. (Belarus) Max Mirnyi (third round)
11. (Peru) Luis Horna (second round, retired)
12. (Italy) Andreas Seppi (second round)
13. (Germany) Philipp Kohlschreiber (quarterfinals)
14. (Belgium) Christophe Rochus (second round)
15. (Serbia and Montenegro) Boris Pašanski (second round)
16. (Romania) Andrei Pavel (third round)

== Draw ==
Key

- Q = Qualifier
- WC = Wild card
- LL = Lucky loser
- Alt = Alternate
- ITF = ITF entry
- PR = Protected ranking
- SR = Special ranking
- SE = Special exempt
- JE = Junior exempt
- JR = Junior Accelerator Programme entrant
- CO = College Accelerator Programme entrant
- NG = Next Gen Accelerator Program entrant
- w/o = Walkover
- r = Retired
- d = Defaulted

=== Finals ===
Quarterfinals
(Ecuador) Nicolás Lapentti	4	4
5	(Spain) Fernando Verdasco	6	6
4	(Argentina) Gastón Gaudio	5	0
9	(Argentina) Agustín Calleri	7	6
7	(Argentina) Juan Ignacio Chela	6	6
13	(Germany) Philipp Kohlschreiber	4	4
8	(Russia) Mikhail Youzhny	6	3	6
(Austria) Jürgen Melzer	3	6	3

Semifinals
5	(Spain) Fernando Verdasco	6	1	3
9	(Argentina) Agustín Calleri	4	6	6
7	(Argentina) Juan Ignacio Chela	6	4	6
8	(Russia) Mikhail Youzhny	2	6	4

Final
9	(Argentina) Agustín Calleri	7^{11}	6	6
7	(Argentina) Juan Ignacio Chela	6^{9}	2	3

=== Top half ===
==== Section 1 ====
First round
(Ecuador) N Lapentti	7^{12}	6
(Czech Republic) T Zíb	6^{10}	3
(Costa Rica) JA Marín	6	4	6^{1}
(Austria) S Koubek	3	6	7^{7}
Q	(Argentina) D Patriarca	7^{7}	2	3
WC	(Austria) A Haider-Maurer	6^{5}	6	6
(Germany) A Waske	6	3	7^{8}
(Poland) Ł Kubot	3	6	6^{6}

Second round
1	(Russia) N Davydenko	3	3
(Ecuador) N Lapentti	6	6
(Austria) S Koubek	6	3	6
15	(Serbia and Montenegro) B Pašanski	1	6	2
10	(Belarus) M Mirnyi	6	6
WC	(Austria) A Haider-Maurer	2	4
(Germany) A Waske	3	3
5	(Spain) F Verdasco	6	6

Third round
(Ecuador) N Lapentti	6	6
(Austria) S Koubek	3	3
10	(Belarus) M Mirnyi	4	5
5	(Spain) F Verdasco	6	7

Quarterfinals
(Ecuador) N Lapentti	4	4
5	(Spain) F Verdasco	6	6

==== Section 2 ====
First round
Q	(Italy) L Azzaro	4	2
(Argentina) J Mónaco	6	6
(Germany) M Berrer	3	6	6^{6}
(Germany) D Gremelmayr	6	3	7^{8}
WC	(Austria) R Eitzinger	6	6
(Austria) O Marach	3	0
Q	(Spain) Á Calatrava	4	6	6
LL	(Argentina) D Junqueira	6	3	4

Second round
4	(Argentina) G Gaudio	7^{7}	4
(Argentina) J Mónaco	6^{4}	1^{r}
(Germany) D Gremelmayr	7	6
14	(Belgium) C Rochus	5	1
9	(Argentina) A Calleri	7^{7}	6
WC	(Austria) R Eitzinger	6^{3}	3
Q	(Spain) Á Calatrava	6	5	6^{3}
6	(Chile) N Massú	3	7	7^{7}

Third round
4	(Argentina) G Gaudio	6^{1}	7^{9}	6
(Germany) D Gremelmayr	7^{7}	6^{7}	0
9	(Argentina) A Calleri	6	7^{7}
6	(Chile) N Massú	2	6^{4}

Quarterfinals
4	(Argentina) G Gaudio	5	0
9	(Argentina) A Calleri	7	6

=== Bottom half ===
==== Section 3 ====
First round
(Germany) R Schüttler	1	0^{r}
(Argentina) M Zabaleta	6	0
WC	(Austria) A Sandbichler	3	3
Q	(Serbia and Montenegro) D Vemić	6	6
(Czech Republic) I Minář	1	6	1
Q	(Australia) P Luczak	6	3	6
(Romania) R Sabău	4	3
Q	(Argentina) S Roitman	6	6

Second round
7	(Argentina) JI Chela	6^{4}	6	6
(Argentina) M Zabaleta	7^{7}	3	3
Q	(Serbia and Montenegro) D Vemić	7^{7}	5
11	(Peru) L Horna	6^{3}	2^{r}
13	(Germany) P Kohlschreiber	7^{7}	7
Q	(Australia) P Luczak	6^{3}	5
Q	(Argentina) S Roitman	3	6	4
3	(Finland) J Nieminen	6	1	6

Third round
7	(Argentina) JI Chela	6	6
Q	(Serbia and Montenegro) D Vemić	4	0
13	(Germany) P Kohlschreiber	6	4	6
3	(Finland) J Nieminen	2	6	3

Quarterfinals
7	(Argentina) JI Chela	6	6
13	(Germany) P Kohlschreiber	4	4

==== Section 4 ====
First round
(Belgium) D Norman	0	4
(Argentina) M Vassallo Argüello	6	6
WC	(Austria) W Eschauer	6	6^{6}	4
(Argentina) E Massa	3	7^{8}	6
(Brazil) M Daniel	6	6
(Spain) A Montañés	4	3
(Spain) Ó Hernández	3	4
(Austria) J Melzer	6	6

Second round
8	(Russia) M Youzhny	0	6	7^{7}
(Argentina) M Vassallo Argüello	6	4	6^{2}
(Argentina) E Massa	7^{7}	7^{7}
12	(Italy) A Seppi	6^{5}	6^{5}
16	(Romania) A Pavel	6	6
(Brazil) M Daniel	4	4
(Austria) J Melzer	6	7
2	(Spain) T Robredo	2	5

Third round
8	(Russia) M Youzhny	6	6
(Argentina) E Massa	4	1
16	(Romania) A Pavel	5	3
(Austria) J Melzer	7	6

Quarterfinals
8	(Russia) M Youzhny	6	3	6
(Austria) J Melzer	3	6	3
