= 2010 Austrian Open Kitzbühel =

- Date: 2–8 August
- Edition: 66th
- Draw: 32S / 16D
- Surface: Clay / outdoor
- Location: Kitzbühel, Austria
- Venue: Tennis Stadium Kitzbühel

Champions

Singles
- (Italy) Andreas Seppi

Doubles
- (Jamaica) Dustin Brown / (Netherlands) Rogier Wassen
- Austrian Open Kitzbühel

The 2010 Austrian Open Kitzbühel was a professional tennis tournament played on outdoor red clay courts. It was the eighth edition of the tournament which is part of the 2010 ATP Challenger Tour. It took place in Kitzbühel, Austria between 2 and 8 August 2010.

Guillermo García-López won in the singles competition and André Sá and Marcelo Melo in the doubles competition in 2009, when the tournament was part of the ATP World Tour 250 series.

== Finals ==
=== Singles ===
(Italy) Andreas Seppi defeated (Romania) Victor Crivoi, 6–2, 6–1

=== Doubles ===
(Jamaica) Dustin Brown / (Netherlands) Rogier Wassen defeated (Chile) Hans Podlipnik-Castillo / (Austria) Max Raditschnigg, 3–6, 7–5, [10–7]

== ATP entrants ==
=== Seeds ===
Nationality	Player	Ranking*	Seeding
ITA	Andreas Seppi	55	1
CZE	Jan Hájek	78	2
URU	Pablo Cuevas	85	3
AUS	Peter Luczak	93	4
GER	Björn Phau	97	5
JAM	Dustin Brown	98	6
ESP	Pablo Andújar	100	7
ITA	Paolo Lorenzi	106	8

- Rankings are as of July 26, 2010.

=== Other entrants ===
The following players received wildcards into the singles main draw:

- (Uruguay) Pablo Cuevas
- (Austria) Thomas Muster
- (Austria) Nicolas Reissig
- (Austria) Dominic Thiem

The following players received a Special Exempt into the main draw:

- (Russia) Evgeny Donskoy
- (Slovakia) Marek Semjan

The following players received entry from the qualifying draw:

- (Austria) Andreas Haider-Maurer
- (Austria) Gerald Kamitz
- (Czech Republic) Jan Minář
- (Poland) Grzegorz Panfil
