= 2010 Austrian Open Kitzbühel – Singles =

Singles
- 2010 Austrian Open Kitzbühel

Final
- Champion: (Italy) Andreas Seppi
- Runner-up: (Romania) Victor Crivoi
- Score: 6–2, 6–1

Details
- Draw: 32
- Seeds: 8

Events
| Singles | Doubles |
- Austrian Open Kitzbühel

Guillermo García-López won in the singles competition in 2009, when the tournament was part of the ATP World Tour 250 series.
First-seeded Andreas Seppi won in the final against Victor Crivoi 6–2, 6–1.

== Seeds ==
1. (Italy) Andreas Seppi (champion)
2. (Czech Republic) Jan Hájek (first round)
3. (Uruguay) Pablo Cuevas (semifinals)
4. (Australia) Peter Luczak (quarterfinals)
5. (Germany) Björn Phau (first round)
6. (Jamaica) Dustin Brown (second round, retired due to left eye injury)
7. (Spain) Pablo Andújar (second round)
8. (Italy) Paolo Lorenzi (first round)

== Draw ==
Key

- Q = Qualifier
- WC = Wild card
- LL = Lucky loser
- Alt = Alternate
- ITF = ITF entry
- PR = Protected ranking
- SR = Special ranking
- SE = Special exempt
- JE = Junior exempt
- JR = Junior Accelerator Programme entrant
- CO = College Accelerator Programme entrant
- NG = Next Gen Accelerator Program entrant
- w/o = Walkover
- r = Retired
- d = Defaulted

=== Finals ===
Semifinals
1 | (Italy) Andreas Seppi | 6 | 7
3/WC | (Uruguay) Pablo Cuevas | 2 | 5
(Romania) Victor Crivoi | 2 | 7 | 6
Q | (Austria) Andreas Haider-Maurer | 6 | 6^{4} | 1

Final
1 | (Italy) Andreas Seppi | 6 | 6
(Romania) Victor Crivoi | 2 | 1

=== Top half ===
First round
1 | (Italy) A Seppi | 6 | 6
(Slovakia) M Kližan | 3 | 1
PR | (Czech Republic) J Vaněk | 7 | 7
Q | (Poland) G Panfil | 6^{2} | 6^{2}
(Slovenia) B Kavčič | 4 | 7 | 4
(France) O Patience | 6 | 5 | 6
(Austria) D Köllerer | 6 | 6
8 | (Italy) P Lorenzi | 2 | 2
3/WC | (Uruguay) P Cuevas | 4 | 6 | 7
SE | (Slovakia) M Semjan | 6 | 3 | 6^{4}
(Spain) Ó Hernández | 5 | 2
(Croatia) A Veić | 7 | 6
(Czech Republic) I Minář | 6 | 6
WC | (Austria) N Reissig | 3 | 2
(Argentina) G Gaudio | 0 | 2
7 | (Spain) P Andújar | 6 | 6

Second round
1 | (Italy) A Seppi | 6 | 6
PR | (Czech Republic) J Vaněk | 4 | 2
(France) O Patience | 6 | 3 | 6^{3}
(Austria) D Köllerer | 2 | 6 | 7
3/WC | (Uruguay) P Cuevas | 3 | 6 | 7
(Croatia) A Veić | 6 | 1 | 6^{3}
(Czech Republic) I Minář | 6 | 6
7 | (Spain) P Andújar | 2 | 4

Quarterfinals
1 | (Italy) A Seppi | 6 | 4 | 5
(Austria) D Köllerer | 4 | 6 | 2^{r}
3/WC | (Uruguay) P Cuevas | 7 | 7
(Czech Republic) I Minář | 5 | 5

Semifinals
1 | (Italy) A Seppi | 6 | 7
3/WC | (Uruguay) P Cuevas | 2 | 5

=== Bottom half ===
First round
5 | (Germany) B Phau | 6 | 4 | 4
(Romania) V Crivoi | 4 | 6 | 6
(France) A Sidorenko | 6 | 6^{6} | 4
WC | (Austria) D Thiem | 3 | 7 | 6
SE | (Russia) E Donskoy | 4 | 2
(Austria) A Peya | 6 | 6
Q | (Czech Republic) J Minář | 6^{3} | 2
4 | (Australia) P Luczak | 7 | 6
6 | (Jamaica) D Brown | 6 | 6
WC | (Austria) T Muster | 4 | 4
(Czech Republic) L Rosol | 6 | 7
(Germany) M Zverev | 2 | 5
Q | (Austria) G Kamitz | 1 | 2
Q | (Austria) A Haider-Maurer | 6 | 6
(Austria) M Fischer | 6 | 6^{5} | 6
2 | (Czech Republic) J Hájek | 4 | 7 | 2

Second round
(Romania) V Crivoi | 6 | 6
WC | (Austria) D Thiem | 2 | 4
(Austria) A Peya | 7 | 5 | 5
4 | (Australia) P Luczak | 5 | 7 | 7
6 | (Jamaica) D Brown | 6^{2} | 0 | r
(Czech Republic) L Rosol | 7 | 1
Q | (Austria) A Haider-Maurer | 6 | 6
(Austria) M Fischer | 2 | 4

Quarterfinals
(Romania) V Crivoi | 6 | 6
4 | (Australia) P Luczak | 3 | 3
(Czech Republic) L Rosol | 4 | 4
Q | (Austria) A Haider-Maurer | 6 | 6

Semifinals
(Romania) V Crivoi | 2 | 7 | 6
Q | (Austria) A Haider-Maurer | 6 | 6^{4} | 1
