= 2011 Sicilia Classic – Singles =

Singles
- 2011 Sicilia Classic

Final
- Champion: (Argentina) Carlos Berlocq
- Runner-up: (Romania) Adrian Ungur
- Score: 6–1, 6–1

Events
Singles	Doubles
← 2010 ·	Sicilia Classic	· 2012 →

Attila Balázs was the defending champion but decided not to participate.
Carlos Berlocq won the tournament against Adrian Ungur 6–1, 6–1 in the final. The final was played on Monday, 10 October 2011 due to bad weather conditions.

== Seeds ==
1. (Portugal) Rui Machado (first round)
2. (Argentina) Carlos Berlocq (champion)
3. (Italy) Filippo Volandri (second round)
4. (Spain) Pere Riba (first round, retired due to fatigue)
5. (Austria) Andreas Haider-Maurer (first round, retired due to gastroenteritis)
6. (Spain) Daniel Gimeno-Traver (first round)
7. (Slovenia) Blaž Kavčič (quarterfinals)
8. (Argentina) Diego Junqueira (semifinals)

== Draw ==
=== Key ===
- Q = Qualifier
- WC = Wild card
- LL = Lucky loser
- Alt = Alternate
- SE = Special exempt
- PR = Protected ranking
- ITF = ITF entry
- JE = Junior exempt
- w/o = Walkover
- r = Retired
- d = Defaulted
- SR = Special ranking

=== Finals ===
Semifinals
(Romania) Adrian Ungur	3	6	7
8	(Argentina) Diego Junqueira	6	2	5
(Germany) Andreas Beck	3	2
2	(Argentina) Carlos Berlocq	6	6

Final
(Romania) Adrian Ungur	1	1
2	(Argentina) Carlos Berlocq	6	6

=== Top half ===
First round
1	(Portugal) R Machado	6	5	5
WC	(Italy) G Naso	4	7	7
Q	(Slovakia) P Červenák	6	6^{4}	6
(France) S Robert	3	7^{7}	4
Q	(Argentina) Diego Schwartzman	3	2
(Romania) A Ungur	6	6
(Spain) D Muñoz-de la Nava	6	3
5	(Austria) A Haider-Maurer	4	0^{r}
4	(Spain) P Riba	6	1	0^{r}
(Portugal) F Gil	2	6	3
(France) J Chardy	2	6	3
(Kazakhstan) Y Schukin	6	3	6
(Serbia) N Ćirić	5	6	6
(Canada) F Dancevic	7	4	3
(Spain) P Carreño-Busta	5	6	3
8	(Argentina) D Junqueira	7	2	6

Second round
WC	(Italy) G Naso	6	6^{3}	4
Q	(Slovakia) P Červenák	0	7^{7}	6
(Romania) A Ungur	6	6
(Spain) D Muñoz-de la Nava	4	3
(Portugal) F Gil	6^{4}	6	6
(Kazakhstan) Y Schukin	7^{7}	4	2
(Serbia) N Ćirić	2	2
8	(Argentina) D Junqueira	6	6

Quarterfinals
Q	(Slovakia) P Červenák	1	1
(Romania) A Ungur	6	6
(Portugal) F Gil	4	6	3
8	(Argentina) D Junqueira	6	2	6

Semifinals
(Romania) A Ungur	3	6	7
8	(Argentina) D Junqueira	6	2	5

=== Bottom half ===
First round
7	(Slovenia) B Kavčič	7	4	6
(Italy) S Vagnozzi	5	6	2
Q	(Spain) J Martí	3	6^{5}
(France) B Paire	6	7^{7}
SE	(Italy) A Giannessi	7	4	1
(Germany) A Beck	5	6	6
WC	(Italy) Antonio Comporto	2	0
3	(Italy) F Volandri	6	6
6	(Spain) D Gimeno-Traver	3	6	3
(Croatia) A Veić	6	3	6
Q	(Argentina) A Molteni	6	7
(Czech Republic) J Pospíšil	4	5
(Italy) A di Mauro	6	6
WC	(Austria) T Muster	2	4
WC	(Italy) Marco Cecchinato	2	3
2	(Argentina) C Berlocq	6	6

Second round
7	(Slovenia) B Kavčič	w/o
(France) B Paire
(Germany) A Beck	6	6
3	(Italy) F Volandri	4	4
(Croatia) A Veić	6	6
Q	(Argentina) A Molteni	0	3
(Italy) A di Mauro	2	2
2	(Argentina) C Berlocq	6	6

Quarterfinals
7	(Slovenia) B Kavčič	6^{2}	2
(Germany) A Beck	7^{7}	6
(Croatia) A Veić	5	1
2	(Argentina) C Berlocq	7	6

Semifinals
(Germany) A Beck	3	2
2	(Argentina) C Berlocq	6	6
