= 2010 Sicilia Classic – Singles =

Singles
- 2010 Sicilia Classic

Final
- Champion: (Hungary) Attila Balázs
- Runner-up: (Austria) Martin Fischer
- Score: 7–6(4), 2–6, 6–1

Events
Singles	Doubles
← 2009 ·	Sicilia Classic	· 2011 →

Adrian Ungur was the defending champion, but was eliminated by Nikola Mektić in the first round.
Attila Balázs won this tournament, by defeating Martin Fischer 7–6(4), 2–6, 6–1 in the final.

== Seeds ==
1. (Italy) Filippo Volandri (second round, retired)
2. (Italy) Simone Bolelli (first round)
3. (Kazakhstan) Yuri Schukin (first round)
4. (Austria) Martin Fischer (final)
5. (Italy) Alessio di Mauro (first round)
6. (Romania) Adrian Ungur (first round)
7. (France) Éric Prodon (first round)
8. (Morocco) Reda El Amrani (first round)

== Draw ==
=== Key ===
- Q = Qualifier
- WC = Wild card
- LL = Lucky loser
- Alt = Alternate
- SE = Special exempt
- PR = Protected ranking
- ITF = ITF entry
- JE = Junior exempt
- w/o = Walkover
- r = Retired
- d = Defaulted
- SR = Special ranking

=== Finals ===
Semifinals
(Italy) Matteo Viola	2	6	6^{6}
4	(Austria) Martin Fischer	6	4	7
(Hungary) Attila Balázs	6	6
(France) Augustin Gensse	3	2

Final
4	(Austria) Martin Fischer	6^{4}	6	1
(Hungary) Attila Balázs	7	2	6

=== Top half ===
First round
1	(Italy) F Volandri	6	6
(Italy) M Crugnola	4	4
WC	(Austria) T Muster	3	0
Q	(Italy) G Naso	6	6
(Italy) M Viola	6	6
(Croatia) A Veić	3	2
(Austria) A Haider-Maurer	6	6
8	(Morocco) R El Amrani	3	3
4	(Austria) M Fischer	6	6
(Romania) M Copil	3	2
(Italy) F Cipolla	4	6	6
(Australia) J Lemke	6	2	1
(Italy) S Galvani	2	3
(Czech Republic) I Minář	6	6
Q	(Italy) A Giannessi	2	6	6
5	(Italy) A di Mauro	6	1	4

Second round
1	(Italy) F Volandri	3	0	r
Q	(Italy) G Naso	6	3
(Italy) M Viola	6	7
(Austria) A Haider-Maurer	4	5
4	(Austria) M Fischer	6	1	6
(Italy) F Cipolla	1	6	4
(Czech Republic) I Minář	6	7
Q	(Italy) A Giannessi	0	6^{4}

Quarterfinals
Q	(Italy) G Naso	5	3
(Italy) M Viola	7	6
4	(Austria) M Fischer	7	5
(Czech Republic) I Minář	5	4	r

Semifinals
(Italy) M Viola	2	6	6^{6}
4	(Austria) M Fischer	6	4	7

=== Bottom half ===
First round
7	(France) É Prodon	6	3	6^{5}
(Italy) A Brizzi	4	6	7
(Russia) A Kumantsov	6	1	2^{r}
Q	(Italy) W Trusendi	2	6	5
(Germany) B Knittel	4	3
SE	(Serbia) B Pašanski	6	6
(Hungary) A Balázs	3	7	6
3	(Kazakhstan) Y Schukin	6	5	3
6	(Romania) A Ungur	6	2	6^{5}
(Croatia) N Mektić	3	6	7
(Italy) S Vagnozzi	1	7	6^{7}
Q	(France) N Devilder	6	5	7
WC	(Italy) M Cecchinato	4	3
WC	(Italy) F Aldi	6	6
(France) A Gensse	7	6
2/WC	(Italy) S Bolelli	6^{6}	0

Second round
(Italy) A Brizzi	6	6^{4}	6
Q	(Italy) W Trusendi	4	7	1
SE	(Serbia) B Pašanski	4	1
(Hungary) A Balázs	6	6
(Croatia) N Mektić	6^{5}	6	5
Q	(France) N Devilder	7	3	7
WC	(Italy) F Aldi	2	2
(France) A Gensse	6	6

Quarterfinals
(Italy) A Brizzi	4	4
(Hungary) A Balázs	6	6
Q	(France) N Devilder	6^{5}	1
(France) A Gensse	7	6

Semifinals
(Hungary) A Balázs	6	6
(France) A Gensse	3	2
