= 2004 Generali Open =

- Date: 19–25 July
- Edition: 49th
- Category: International Series Gold
- Draw: 48S / 16D
- Prize money: $782,828
- Surface: Clay / outdoor
- Location: Kitzbühel, Austria

Champions

Singles
- (Chile) Nicolás Massú

Doubles
- (Czech Republic) František Čermák / (Czech Republic) Leoš Friedl
← 2003 ·	Generali Open	· 2005 →

The 2004 Generali Open was a men's tennis tournament played on outdoor clay courts at the Tennis Stadium Kitzbühel in Kitzbühel, Austria and was part of the International Series Gold of the 2004 ATP Tour. It was the 49th edition of the tournament and ran from 19 July until 25 July 2004. Third-seeded Nicolás Massú won the singles title.

== Finals ==
=== Singles ===
(Chile) Nicolás Massú defeated (Argentina) Gastón Gaudio 7–6^{(7–3)}, 6–4

- It was Massú's 1st singles title of the year and the 4th of his career.

=== Doubles ===
(Czech Republic) František Čermák / (Czech Republic) Leoš Friedl defeated (Argentina) Lucas Arnold Ker / (Argentina) Martín García 6–3, 7–5
