= 2004 Generali Open – Doubles =

Doubles
- 2004 Generali Open

Final
- Champions: (Czech Republic) František Čermák (Czech Republic) Leoš Friedl
- Runners-up: (Argentina) Lucas Arnold Ker (Argentina) Martín García
- Score: 6–3, 7–5

Details
- Draw: 16
- Seeds: 4

Events
Singles	Doubles
- Austrian Open Kitzbühel

Martin Damm and Cyril Suk were the defending champions, but lost in the semifinals to Lucas Arnold Ker and Martín García.

František Čermák and Leoš Friedl won the tournament by defeating Arnold Ker and García 6–3, 7–5 in the final.

== Seeds ==
1. (Czech Republic) Martin Damm / (Czech Republic) Cyril Suk (semifinals)
2. (United States) Jared Palmer / (Czech Republic) Pavel Vízner (semifinals)
3. (Czech Republic) František Čermák / (Czech Republic) Leoš Friedl (champions)
4. (Argentina) Mariano Hood / (Argentina) Sebastián Prieto (quarterfinals)

== Draw ==
Key

- Q = Qualifier
- WC = Wild card
- LL = Lucky loser
- Alt = Alternate
- ITF = ITF entry
- PR = Protected ranking
- SR = Special ranking
- SE = Special exempt
- JE = Junior exempt
- JR = Junior Accelerator Programme entrant
- CO = College Accelerator Programme entrant
- NG = Next Gen Accelerator Program entrant
- w/o = Walkover
- r = Retired
- d = Defaulted

=== Draw ===
First round
1	(Czech Republic) M Damm (Czech Republic) C Suk	7^{11}	6
(Germany) K Braasch (Germany) R Schüttler	6^{9}	3
(South Africa) J Coetzee (South Africa) C Haggard	7^{7}	6^{7}	6
(Switzerland) I Heuberger (Argentina) J Mónaco	6^{5}	7^{9}	4
4	(Argentina) M Hood (Argentina) S Prieto	6	6
WC	(Austria) R Eitzinger (Austria) P Schmölzer	4	2
(Argentina) L Arnold Ker (Argentina) M García	6	6^{4}	6
(Czech Republic) T Cibulec (Czech Republic) P Pála	0	7^{7}	3
(Australia) A Fisher (Australia) S Huss	0	r
(Italy) S Pescosolido (Italy) P Starace	3
(Italy) G Bazzica (Chile) A García	1	2
3	(Czech Republic) F Čermák (Czech Republic) L Friedl	6	6
WC	(Spain) E Benfele Álvarez (Brazil) J Goffi	6	3	6^{3}
(Austria) J Melzer (Austria) A Peya	4	6	7^{7}
(Peru) L Horna (Chile) N Massú	1	1
2	(United States) J Palmer (Czech Republic) P Vízner	6	6

Quarterfinals
1	(Czech Republic) M Damm (Czech Republic) C Suk	6	6
(South Africa) J Coetzee (South Africa) C Haggard	3	4
4	(Argentina) M Hood (Argentina) S Prieto	4	2
(Argentina) L Arnold Ker (Argentina) M García	6	6
(Italy) S Pescosolido (Italy) P Starace	4	2
3	(Czech Republic) F Čermák (Czech Republic) L Friedl	6	6
(Austria) J Melzer (Austria) A Peya	6	4	4
2	(United States) J Palmer (Czech Republic) P Vízner	4	6	6

Semifinals
1	(Czech Republic) M Damm (Czech Republic) C Suk	3	1
(Argentina) L Arnold Ker (Argentina) M García	6	6
3	(Czech Republic) F Čermák (Czech Republic) L Friedl	7^{7}	6
2	(United States) J Palmer (Czech Republic) P Vízner	6^{3}	4

Final
(Argentina) L Arnold Ker (Argentina) M García	3	5
3	(Czech Republic) F Čermák (Czech Republic) L Friedl	6	7
