= 2004 Generali Open – Singles =

Singles
- 2004 Generali Open

Final
- Champion: (Chile) Nicolás Massú
- Runner-up: (Argentina) Gastón Gaudio
- Score: 7–6^{(7–3)}, 6–4

Details
- Draw: 48 (4WC/6Q)
- Seeds: 16

Events
Singles	Doubles
- Austrian Open Kitzbühel

Guillermo Coria was the defending champion, but did not compete this year.

Third-seeded Nicolás Massú won the title by defeating Gastón Gaudio 7–6^{(7–3)}, 6–4 in the final.

== Seeds ==
All seeds received a bye to the second round.

1. (Germany) Rainer Schüttler (semifinals)
2. (Argentina) Gastón Gaudio (final)
3. (Chile) Nicolás Massú (champion)
4. (Spain) Feliciano López (quarterfinals)
5. (Argentina) Mariano Zabaleta (quarterfinals)
6. (Germany) Florian Mayer (quarterfinals)
7. (Peru) Luis Horna (quarterfinals)
8. (Spain) Fernando Verdasco (semifinals)
9. (Georgia (country)) Irakli Labadze (second round)
10. (Spain) David Ferrer (second round)
11. (Spain) Albert Costa (third round)
12. (Austria) Jürgen Melzer (second round)
13. (Spain) David Sánchez (third round, retired)
14. (Russia) Nikolay Davydenko (third round)
15. (Czech Republic) Tomáš Berdych (third round)
16. (Spain) Albert Montañés (second round)

== Draw ==
Key

- Q = Qualifier
- WC = Wild card
- LL = Lucky loser
- Alt = Alternate
- ITF = ITF entry
- PR = Protected ranking
- SR = Special ranking
- SE = Special exempt
- JE = Junior exempt
- JR = Junior Accelerator Programme entrant
- CO = College Accelerator Programme entrant
- NG = Next Gen Accelerator Program entrant
- w/o = Walkover
- r = Retired
- d = Defaulted

=== Finals ===
Quarterfinals
1	(Germany) Rainer Schüttler	7^{8}	6
6	(Germany) Florian Mayer	6^{6}	2
3	(Chile) Nicolás Massú	7^{7}	7^{8}
5	(Argentina) Mariano Zabaleta	6^{4}	6^{6}
8	(Spain) Fernando Verdasco	6	6
4	(Spain) Feliciano López	2	3
7	(Peru) Luis Horna	6^{5}	6^{1}
2	(Argentina) Gastón Gaudio	7^{7}	7^{7}

Semifinals
1	(Germany) Rainer Schüttler	3	3
3	(Chile) Nicolás Massú	6	6
8	(Spain) Fernando Verdasco	0	2
2	(Argentina) Gastón Gaudio	6	6

Final
3	(Chile) Nicolás Massú	7^{7}	6
2	(Argentina) Gastón Gaudio	6^{3}	4

=== Top half ===
==== Section 1 ====
First round
(Czech Republic) M Tabara	6^{4}	3
WC	(Italy) A Seppi	7^{7}	6
(Switzerland) I Heuberger	6^{0}	4
Q	(Czech Republic) F Čermák	7^{7}	6
(Argentina) J Mónaco	7	6
(Argentina) JP Guzmán	5	4
(Austria) A Peya	2	6^{4}
(Australia) P Luczak	6	7^{7}

Second round
1	(Germany) R Schüttler	3	7^{15}	6
WC	(Italy) A Seppi	6	6^{13}	0
Q	(Czech Republic) F Čermák	4	7	4
13	(Spain) D Sánchez	6	5	6
10	(Spain) D Ferrer	3	4
(Argentina) J Mónaco	6	6
(Australia) P Luczak	2	4
6	(Germany) F Mayer	6	6

Third round
1	(Germany) R Schüttler	6
13	(Spain) D Sánchez	0	r
(Argentina) J Mónaco	4	4
6	(Germany) F Mayer	6	6

Quarterfinals
1	(Germany) R Schüttler	7^{8}	6
6	(Germany) F Mayer	6^{6}	2

==== Section 2 ====
First round
Q	(Kazakhstan) Y Schukin	6	3	6
WC	(Austria) J Ager	1	6	3
(Spain) M López	6^{1}	2
(Italy) P Starace	7^{7}	6
(Czech Republic) R Štěpánek	6^{2}	7	7^{7}
Q	(Spain) D Gimeno Traver	7^{7}	5	6^{3}
(Spain) A Portas	1	4
(Spain) Ó Hernández	6	6

Second round
3	(Chile) N Massú	6	6
Q	(Kazakhstan) Y Schukin	2	3
(Italy) P Starace	2	5
15	(Czech Republic) T Berdych	6	7
9	(Georgia (country)) I Labadze	2	6^{1}
(Czech Republic) R Štěpánek	6	7^{7}
(Spain) Ó Hernández	6^{5}	2
5	(Argentina) M Zabaleta	7^{7}	6

Third round
3	(Chile) N Massú	7^{7}	3	6
15	(Czech Republic) T Berdych	6^{3}	6	4
(Czech Republic) R Štěpánek	3	5
5	(Argentina) M Zabaleta	6	7

Quarterfinals
3	(Chile) N Massú	7^{7}	7^{8}
5	(Argentina) M Zabaleta	6^{4}	6^{6}

=== Bottom half ===
==== Section 3 ====
First round
Q	(France) PH Mathieu	4	2
Q	(Argentina) F Squillari	6	6
(Argentina) M Vassallo Argüello	6	6^{3}	6
(France) N Thomann	4	7^{7}	1
(Spain) S Ventura	7^{7}	6
(Italy) S Pescosolido	6^{4}	4
(Switzerland) M Rosset	3	0
(Austria) S Koubek	6	6

Second round
8	(Spain) F Verdasco	7^{7}	6
Q	(Argentina) F Squillari	6^{3}	2
(Argentina) M Vassallo Argüello	6	6
12	(Austria) J Melzer	4	2
16	(Spain) A Montañés	2	1
(Spain) S Ventura	6	6
(Austria) S Koubek	6	3	4
4	(Spain) F López	3	6	6

Third round
8	(Spain) F Verdasco	7^{9}	6
(Argentina) M Vassallo Argüello	6^{7}	3
(Spain) S Ventura	3	0
4	(Spain) F López	6	6

Quarterfinals
8	(Spain) F Verdasco	6	6
4	(Spain) F López	2	3

==== Section 4 ====
First round
(Chile) A García	0	3
(Colombia) A Falla	6	6
WC	(Austria) W Eschauer	6	6
WC	(Austria) T Schiessling	3	2
(Italy) A di Mauro	6	2	4
(Belgium) D Norman	3	6	6
(Spain) G Blanco	6^{2}	6^{11}
Q	(Czech Republic) I Minář	7^{7}	7^{13}

Second round
7	(Peru) L Horna	7^{7}	7^{7}
(Colombia) A Falla	6^{3}	6^{2}
WC	(Austria) W Eschauer	3	7^{7}	3
11	(Spain) A Costa	6	6^{2}	6
14	(Russia) N Davydenko	6	6
(Belgium) D Norman	2	2
Q	(Czech Republic) I Minář	4	1
2	(Argentina) G Gaudio	6	6

Third round
7	(Peru) L Horna	4	7^{7}	6
11	(Spain) A Costa	6	6^{4}	4
14	(Russia) N Davydenko	3	3
2	(Argentina) G Gaudio	6	6

Quarterfinals
7	(Peru) L Horna	6^{5}	6^{1}
2	(Argentina) G Gaudio	7^{7}	7^{7}
