= 2005 Austrian Open – Singles =

Singles
- 2005 Austrian Open

Final
- Champion: (Argentina) Gastón Gaudio
- Runner-up: (Spain) Fernando Verdasco
- Score: 2–6, 6–2, 6–4, 6–4

Details
- Draw: 48
- Seeds: 16

Events
Singles	Doubles
- Austrian Open

In the 2005 Austrian Open Singles, Nicolás Massú was the defending champion, but lost in the semifinals to Fernando Verdasco.

Third-seeded Gastón Gaudio won the title, defeating Verdasco 2–6, 6–2, 6–4, 6–4 in the final.

== Seeds ==
All seeds received a bye into the second round.

1. (Russia) Nikolay Davydenko (second round)
2. (Argentina) Mariano Puerta (third round)
3. (Argentina) Gastón Gaudio (champion)
4. (Chile) Fernando González (third round)
5. (Spain) Feliciano López (quarterfinals)
6. (Russia) Mikhail Youzhny (quarterfinals)
7. (Chile) Nicolás Massú (semifinals)
8. (Belgium) Olivier Rochus (second round)
9. (Austria) Jürgen Melzer (third round)
10. (Romania) Andrei Pavel (third round, retired due to heat exhaustion)
11. (Argentina) José Acasuso (second round)
12. (Belgium) Christophe Rochus (second round, retired due to cramps)
13. (Russia) Igor Andreev (second round)
14. (Peru) Luis Horna (second round)
15. (Romania) Victor Hănescu (quarterfinals)
16. (France) Paul-Henri Mathieu (second round, retired due to gastritis)

== Draw ==
Key

- Q = Qualifier
- WC = Wild card
- LL = Lucky loser
- Alt = Alternate
- ITF = ITF entry
- PR = Protected ranking
- SR = Special ranking
- SE = Special exempt
- JE = Junior exempt
- JR = Junior Accelerator Programme entrant
- CO = College Accelerator Programme entrant
- NG = Next Gen Accelerator Program entrant
- w/o = Walkover
- r = Retired
- d = Defaulted

=== Finals ===
Quarterfinals
(Argentina) Mariano Zabaleta	6	6
5	(Spain) Feliciano López	4	2
3	(Argentina) Gastón Gaudio	6	4	6
6	(Russia) Mikhail Youzhny	4	6	4
7	(Chile) Nicolás Massú	6	6^{0}	6
WC	(Ecuador) Nicolás Lapentti	4	7^{7}	2
(Spain) Fernando Verdasco	6	6
15	(Romania) Victor Hănescu	3	3

Semifinals
(Argentina) Mariano Zabaleta	1	1
3	(Argentina) Gastón Gaudio	6	6
7	(Chile) Nicolás Massú	6	3	5
(Spain) Fernando Verdasco	3	6	7

Final
3	(Argentina) Gastón Gaudio	2	6	6	6
(Spain) Fernando Verdasco	6	2	4	4

=== Top half ===
==== Section 1 ====
First round
(France) J Haehnel	2	6^{3}
(Argentina) M Zabaleta	6	7^{7}
(Romania) R Sabău	3	2
(Spain) N Almagro	6	6
(Argentina) J Mónaco	7	6^{4}	4
(Germany) F Mayer	5	7^{7}	6
(Netherlands) R Sluiter	2	3
(Italy) A di Mauro	6	6

Second round
1	(Russia) N Davydenko	4	6^{5}
(Argentina) M Zabaleta	6	7^{7}
(Spain) N Almagro	6	6
13	(Russia) I Andreev	3	2
11	(Argentina) J Acasuso	3	4
(Germany) F Mayer	6	6
(Italy) A di Mauro	6^{4}	4
5	(Spain) F López	7^{7}	6

Third round
(Argentina) M Zabaleta	6	4	6
(Spain) N Almagro	3	6	3
(Germany) F Mayer	5	1
5	(Spain) F López	7	6

Quarterfinals
(Argentina) M Zabaleta	6	6
5	(Spain) F López	4	2

==== Section 2 ====
First round
(Germany) P Kohlschreiber	6	6
(Spain) A Costa	2	4
Q	(Australia) P Luczak	3	6^{4}
(Czech Republic) R Vik	6	7^{7}
(Spain) D Sánchez	3	3
(Germany) R Schüttler	6	6
Q	(Russia) Y Schukin	3	6^{5}
(Czech Republic) I Minář	6	7^{7}

Second round
3	(Argentina) G Gaudio	7	6
(Germany) P Kohlschreiber	5	3
(Czech Republic) R Vik	7	1
16	(France) P-H Mathieu	5	0^{r}
10	(Romania) A Pavel	6	3	7^{7}
(Germany) R Schüttler	4	6	6^{4}
(Czech Republic) I Minář	0	5
6	(Russia) M Youzhny	6	7

Third round
3	(Argentina) G Gaudio	6	6
(Czech Republic) R Vik	4	2
10	(Romania) A Pavel	2	0^{r}
6	(Russia) M Youzhny	6	1

Quarterfinals
3	(Argentina) G Gaudio	6	4	6
6	(Russia) M Youzhny	4	6	4

=== Bottom half ===
==== Section 3 ====
First round
(Czech Republic) M Tabara	6^{4}	6	4
WC	(Austria) D Köllerer	7^{7}	3	6
Q	(United States) H Armando	4	2
(Austria) S Koubek	6	6
(Argentina) A Calleri	4	0^{r}
WC	(Ecuador) N Lapentti	6	3
(Czech Republic) T Zíb	6	5	2
WC	(Austria) O Marach	3	7	6

Second round
7	(Chile) N Massú	7^{7}	7
WC	(Austria) D Köllerer	6^{5}	5
(Austria) S Koubek	4	6	5
12	(Belgium) C Rochus	6	4	4^{r}
14	(Peru) L Horna	4	1
WC	(Ecuador) N Lapentti	6	6
WC	(Austria) O Marach	3	4
4	(Chile) F González	6	6

Third round
7	(Chile) N Massú	7	6
(Austria) S Koubek	5	2
WC	(Ecuador) N Lapentti	4	7	6
4	(Chile) F González	6	5	3

Quarterfinals
7	(Chile) N Massú	6	6^{0}	6
WC	(Ecuador) N Lapentti	4	7^{7}	2

==== Section 4 ====
First round
(Spain) F Verdasco	6	6
(Italy) A Seppi	2	4
Q	(Serbia and Montenegro) D Vemić	6	1	6
WC	(Austria) M Hipfl	3	6	3
(Spain) S Ventura	4	2
(Germany) T Behrend	6	6
Q	(Spain) R Ramírez Hidalgo	3	3
Q	(Georgia (country)) I Labadze	6	6

Second round
8	(Belgium) O Rochus	5	3
(Spain) F Verdasco	7	6
Q	(Serbia and Montenegro) D Vemić	2	6	3
9	(Austria) J Melzer	6	3	6
15	(Romania) V Hănescu	6	6
(Germany) T Behrend	0	1
Q	(Georgia (country)) I Labadze	3	4
2	(Argentina) M Puerta	6	6

Third round
(Spain) F Verdasco	1	6	6
9	(Austria) J Melzer	6	2	1
15	(Romania) V Hănescu	6	6
2	(Argentina) M Puerta	4	3

Quarterfinals
(Spain) F Verdasco	6	6
15	(Romania) V Hănescu	3	3
