= Armin Sandbichler =

Austrian tennis player

- Country (sports): Austria
- Born: 22 January 1985 (age 40); Schwaz, Austria
- Height: 5 ft 11 in (180 cm)
- Plays: Left-handed
- Prize money: $45,780

Singles
- Career record: 0–1 (ATP Tour)
- Highest ranking: No. 421 (29 Oct 2007)

Doubles
- Career record: 0–1 (ATP Tour)
- Highest ranking: No. 345 (16 Jun 2008)

Armin Sandbichler (born 22 January 1985) is an Austrian former professional tennis player.

Born in Schwaz, Sandbichler was a left-handed player and turned professional in 2005. He made his only ATP Tour singles main draw appearance at the 2006 Austrian Open, falling to Dušan Vemić in the first round. In 2007 he reached his career high singles ranking of 421 in the world. He won two singles and five doubles titles at ITF Futures level.

== ITF Futures titles ==
=== Singles: (2) ===
| No. | Date | Tournament | Surface | Opponent | Score |
|---|---|---|---|---|---|
| 1. | Feb 2006 | Poland F1, Szczecin | Hard | (Czech Republic) Petr Kralert | 7–6^{(4)}, 7–6^{(5)} |
| 2. | Jun 2008 | Austria F5, Telfs | Clay | (Germany) Marc Sieber | 7–5, 6–0 |

=== Doubles: (5) ===
| No. | Date | Tournament | Surface | Partner | Opponents | Score |
|---|---|---|---|---|---|---|
| 1. | May 2007 | Poland F2, Zabrze | Clay | (Austria) Andreas Haider-Maurer | (Sweden) Johan Brunström (United States) Philip Stolt | 3–6, 6–2, 6–2 |
| 2. | Jul 2007 | Austria F4, Vandans | Clay | (Austria) Philipp Oswald | (Austria) Tobias Koeck (Romania) Bogdan-Victor Leonte | 6–4, 3–6, 7–6^{(8)} |
| 3. | Jul 2007 | Austria F5, Telfs | Clay | (Austria) Andreas Haider-Maurer | (Spain) Sergio Barberan-Miquel (Spain) Edualdo Bonet-De Gispert | 6–2, 3–6, 6–0 |
| 4. | Jul 2007 | Austria F6, Kramsach | Clay | (Austria) Philipp Oswald | (Czech Republic) Dušan Karol (Czech Republic) Filip Zeman | 7–6^{(3)}, 6–4 |
| 5. | Feb 2008 | Switzerland F1, Leuggern | Hard | (Jamaica) Dustin Brown | (Poland) Błażej Koniusz (Poland) Grzegorz Panfil | 6–3, 6–2 |
