= 2009 Sicilia Classic Mancuso Company Cup =

- Date: 21–27 September
- Edition: 1st
- Location: Palermo, Italy

Champions

Singles
- (Romania) Adrian Ungur

Doubles
- (Austria) Martin Fischer / (Austria) Philipp Oswald
Sicilia Classic Mancuso Company Cup	· 2010 →

The 2009 Sicilia Classic Mancuso Company Cup was a professional tennis tournament played on outdoor red clay courts. It was the first edition of the tournament which was part of the 2009 ATP Challenger Tour. It took place in Palermo, Italy between 21 and 27 September 2009.

== Singles main draw entrants ==
=== Seeds ===
Country	Player	Rank^{1}	Seed
AUS	Carsten Ball	128	1
RSA	~~Kevin Anderson~~	~~137~~	~~2~~
ESP	Iván Navarro	138	3
ISR	Harel Levy	140	4
BEL	~~Xavier Malisse~~	~~152~~	~~5~~
ITA	Flavio Cipolla	166	6
AUT	Martin Fischer	188	7
ITA	Alessio di Mauro	201	8

- Rankings are as of 14 September 2009.

=== Other entrants ===
The following players received wildcards into the singles main draw:

- (Italy) Francesco Aldi
- (Italy) Alberto Cammarata
- (Italy) Antonio Comporto
- (Russia) Andrey Kuznetsov

The following players received entry from the qualifying draw:

- (Morocco) Reda El Amrani
- (Spain) Sergio Gutiérrez-Ferrol
- (Germany) Gero Kretschmer
- (Italy) Walter Trusendi (as a Lucky loser)
- (Netherlands) Antal van der Duim
- (Italy) Kaes Van't Hof (as a Lucky loser)

== Champions ==
=== Singles ===
(Romania) Adrian Ungur def. (Spain) Albert Ramos-Viñolas, 6–4, 6–4

=== Doubles ===
(Austria) Martin Fischer / (Austria) Philipp Oswald def. (Canada) Pierre-Ludovic Duclos / (Brazil) Rogério Dutra da Silva, 4–6, 6–3, [10–5]
