= 2011 Sicilia Classic =

- Date: 3–9 October
- Edition: 3rd
- Location: Palermo, Italy

Champions

Singles
- (Argentina) Carlos Berlocq

Doubles
- (Poland) Tomasz Bednarek / (Poland) Mateusz Kowalczyk
← 2010 ·	Sicilia Classic	· 2012 →

The 2011 Sicilia Classic was a professional tennis tournament played on clay courts. It was the third edition of the tournament which was part of the 2011 ATP Challenger Tour. It took place in Palermo, Italy between 3 and 9 October 2011.

== ATP entrants ==
=== Seeds ===
Country	Player	Rank^{1}	Seed
POR	Rui Machado	62	1
ARG	Carlos Berlocq	69	2
ITA	Filippo Volandri	70	3
ESP	Pere Riba	71	4
AUT	Andreas Haider-Maurer	81	5
ESP	Daniel Gimeno Traver	87	6
SVN	Blaž Kavčič	94	7
ARG	Diego Junqueira	97	8

- ^{1} Rankings are as of September 26, 2011.

=== Other entrants ===
The following players received wildcards into the singles main draw:

- (Italy) Marco Cecchinato
- (Italy) Antonio Comporto
- (Austria) Thomas Muster
- (Italy) Gianluca Naso

The following players received entry as a special exempt into the singles main draw:

- (Italy) Alessandro Giannessi

The following players received entry from the qualifying draw:

- (Slovakia) Pavol Červenák
- (Spain) Javier Martí
- (Argentina) Andrés Molteni
- (Argentina) Diego Schwartzman

== Champions ==
=== Singles ===
(Argentina) Carlos Berlocq def. (Romania) Adrian Ungur, 6–1, 6–1

=== Doubles ===
(Poland) Tomasz Bednarek / (Poland) Mateusz Kowalczyk def. (Belarus) Aliaksandr Bury / (Belarus) Andrei Vasilevski, 6–2, 6–4
