= 2006 Austrian Open =

Tennis tournament held in Australia 2006

- Date: 24–30 July
- Edition: 36th
- Category: International Series Gold
- Draw: 48S / 16D
- Prize money: $735,000
- Surface: Clay / outdoor
- Location: Kitzbühel, Austria
- Venue: Kitzbühel Sportpark Tennis Stadium

Champions

Singles
- (Argentina) Agustín Calleri

Doubles
- (Austria) Stefan Koubek / (Germany) Philipp Kohlschreiber
- Austrian Open

The 2006 Generali Open was men's tennis tournament played on outdoor clay courts. It was the 36th edition of the Austrian Open, and was part of the International Series Gold of the 2006 ATP Tour. It took place at the Kitzbühel Sportpark Tennis Stadium in Kitzbühel, Austria, from 24 July through 30 July 2006. Ninth-seeded Agustín Calleri won the singles title.

== Finals ==
=== Singles ===
(Argentina) Agustín Calleri defeated (Argentina) Juan Ignacio Chela 7–6^{(11–9)}, 6–2, 6–3

- It was Calleri's 1st singles title of the year and the 2nd of his career.

=== Doubles ===
(Austria) Stefan Koubek / (Germany) Philipp Kohlschreiber defeated (Austria) Oliver Marach / (Czech Republic) Cyril Suk 6–2, 6–3

- It was Koubek's 1st title of the year and the 1st of his career. It was Kohlschreiber's 1st title of the year and the 2nd of his career.
