= 2005 Austrian Open =

- Date: 25–31 July
- Edition: 35th
- Category: International Series Gold
- Draw: 48S / 16D
- Prize money: $760,000
- Surface: Clay / outdoor
- Location: Kitzbühel, Austria
- Venue: Kitzbühel Sportpark Tennis Stadium

Champions

Singles
- (Argentina) Gastón Gaudio

Doubles
- (Czech Republic) Leoš Friedl / (Romania) Andrei Pavel
- Austrian Open

The 2005 Generali Open was a men's tennis tournament played on outdoor clay courts. It was the 35th edition of the Austrian Open, and was part of the International Series Gold of the 2005 ATP Tour. It took place at the Kitzbühel Sportpark Tennis Stadium in Kitzbühel, Austria, from 25 July until 31 July 2005. Third-seeded Gastón Gaudio won the singles title.

== Finals ==
=== Singles ===
(Argentina) Gastón Gaudio defeated (Spain) Fernando Verdasco 2–6, 6–2, 6–4, 6–4

- It was Gaudio's 5th title of the year and the 8th of his career.

=== Doubles ===
(Czech Republic) Leoš Friedl / (Romania) Andrei Pavel defeated (Belgium) Christophe Rochus / (Belgium) Olivier Rochus 6–2, 6–7^{(5–7)}, 6–0

- It was Friedl's 6th title of the year and the 11th of his career. It was Pavel's 1st title of the year and the 2nd of his career.
