= Kramsach =

- Municipality
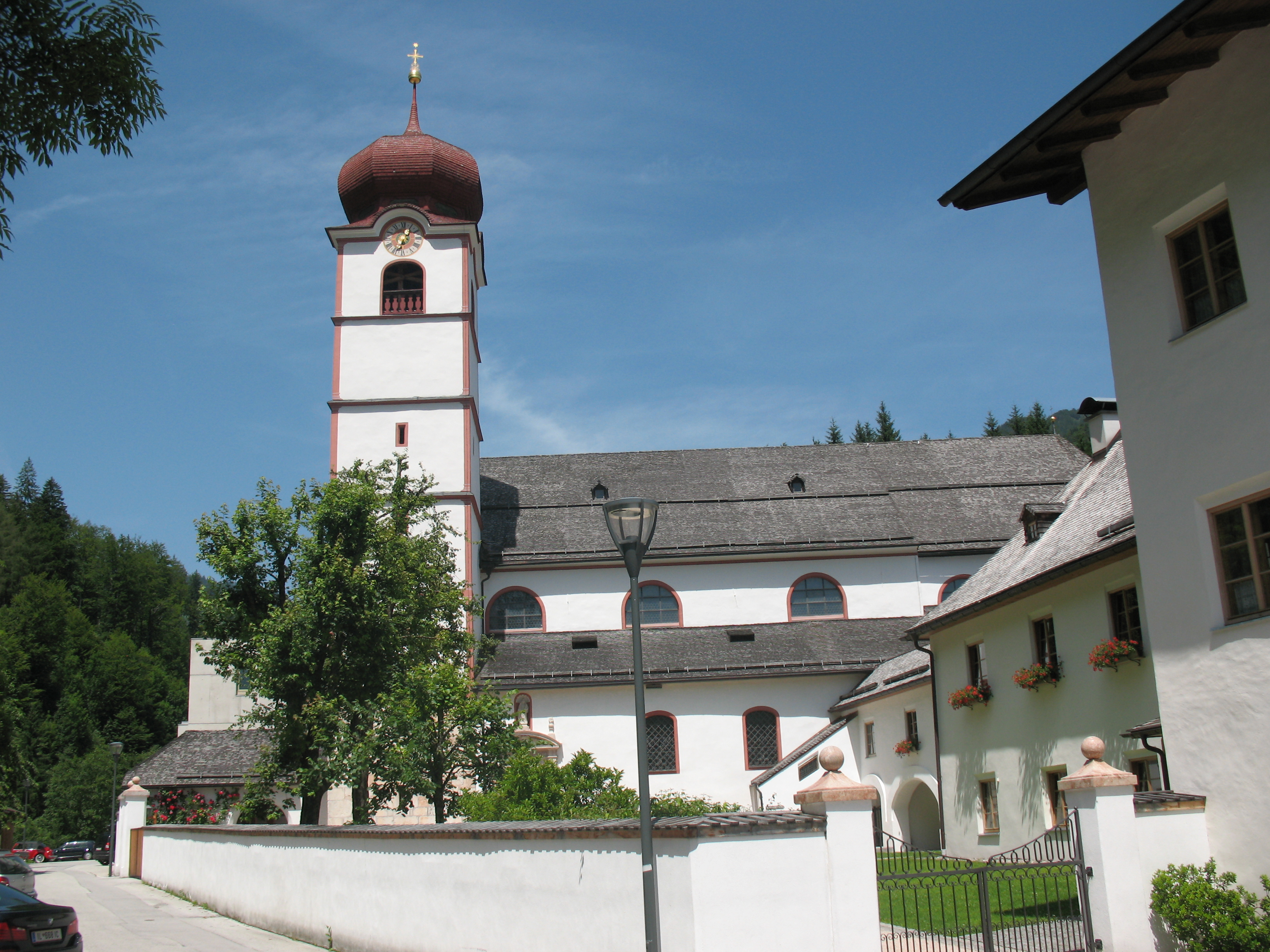
- Church of Saint Dominic

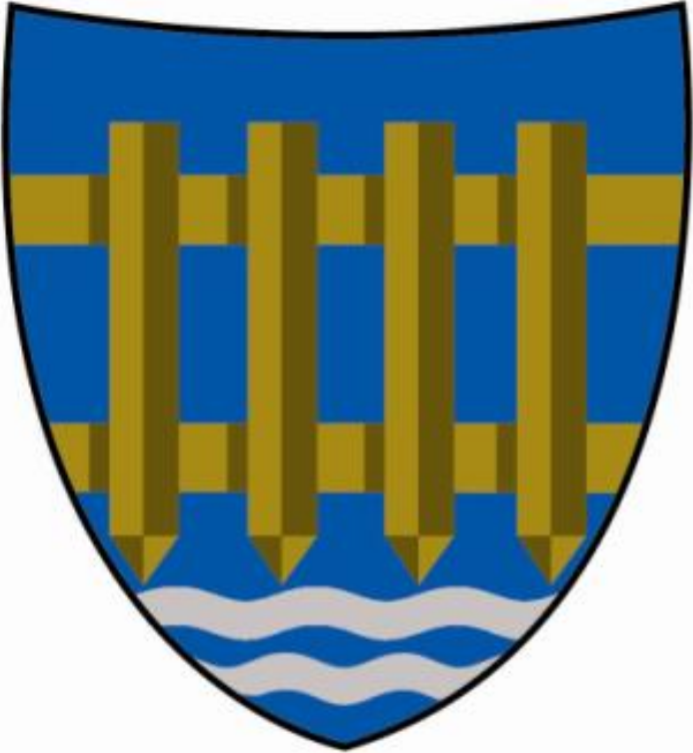
- Coat of arms

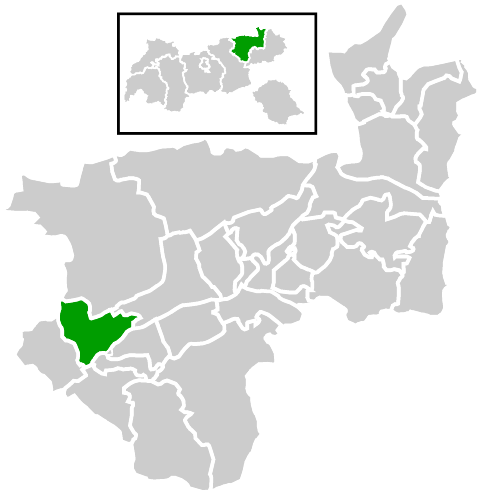
- Location within Kufstein district

- Location within Austria
- Coordinates: 47°26′41″N 11°52′53″E
- Country: Austria
- State: Tyrol
- District: Kufstein

Government
  - Mayor: Bernhard Zisterer (ÖVP)

Area
  - Total: 26.9 km^{2} (10.4 sq mi)
- Elevation: 520 m (1,710 ft)

Population (2018-01-01)
  - Total: 4,891
  - Density: 182/km^{2} (471/sq mi)
- Time zone: UTC+1 (CET)
  - Summer (DST): UTC+2 (CEST)
- Postal code: 6233
- Area code: 05337
- Vehicle registration: KU
- Website: www.kramsach.at

Kramsach is a municipality in the Kufstein district in the Austrian state of Tyrol located 27 kilometres (17 mi) southwest of Kufstein and 16.5 km (10.3 mi) west of Wörgl, at the northern side of the Inn River. Its main sources of income are the marble, timber and glass industries, as well as summer tourism. Kramsach is also known as the "Lake village of Tyrol" because there are six lakes nearby.
