= Philipp Oswald =

Austrian tennis player

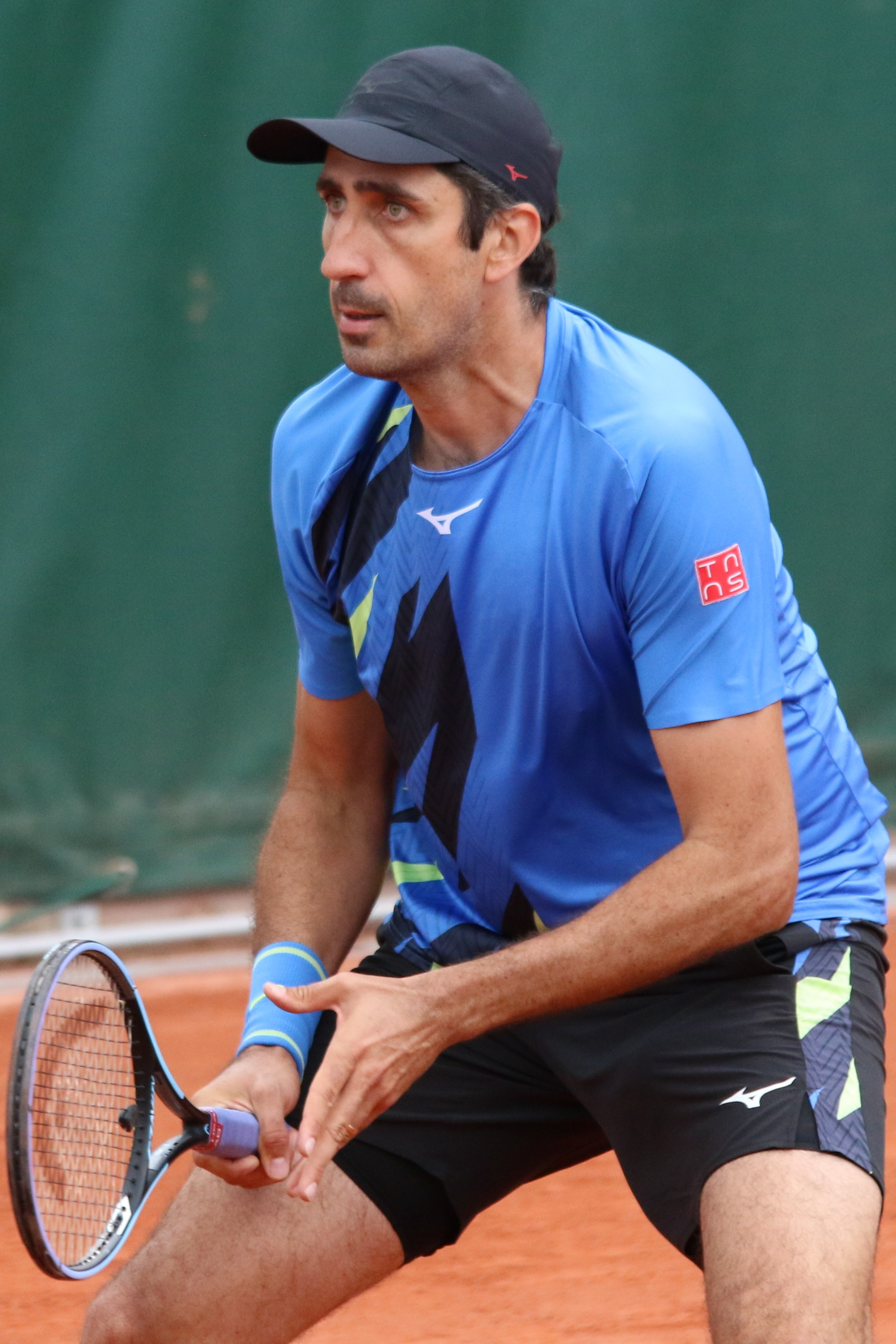
- Oswald at the 2022 French Open
- Country (sports): Austria
- Residence: Feldkirch, Austria
- Born: 23 January 1986 (age 39) Feldkirch, Austria
- Height: 2.01 m (6 ft 7 in)
- Turned pro: 2005
- Retired: 2024
- Plays: Right-handed (one-handed backhand)
- Coach: Joachim Kretz
- Prize money: US$ 1,583,656

Singles
- Career record: 1–3
- Career titles: 0
- Highest ranking: No. 206 (7 December 2009)

Grand Slam singles results
- Australian Open: Q2 (2010)
- French Open: Q1 (2010, 2012)
- Wimbledon: Q1 (2010, 2012)

Doubles
- Career record: 190–203
- Career titles: 11
- Highest ranking: No. 31 (21 June 2021)

Grand Slam doubles results
- Australian Open: QF (2021)
- French Open: 2R (2014, 2017, 2021)
- Wimbledon: 2R (2017, 2021, 2022)
- US Open: 3R (2014, 2015, 2022)

Other doubles tournaments
- Olympic Games: 2R (2021)

Team competitions
- Davis Cup: 3–4

Philipp Oswald (German pronunciation: [ˈfiːlɪp ˈʔɔsvalt]; born 23 January 1986) is an Austrian former professional tennis player who primarily played doubles events on the ATP Tour. On 7 December 2009, he reached his highest ATP singles ranking of world No. 206, and his highest doubles ranking of No. 31 was reached on 21 June 2021. In 2021, he participated in the 2020 Tokyo Olympics partnering with Oliver Marach.

In July 2024, Oswald retired from professional tennis and made his final appearance at the 2024 Generali Open Kitzbühel.

== ATP career finals ==
=== Doubles: 22 (11 titles, 11 runner-ups) ===
Legend Grand Slam tournaments (0–0) ATP World Tour Finals (0–0) ATP World Tour Masters 1000 (0–0) ATP World Tour 500 Series (1–0) ATP World Tour 250 Series (10–11)	Finals by surface Hard (2–7) Clay (9–3) Grass (0–1)	Finals by setting Outdoor (8–8) Indoor (3–3)

Result	W–L	Date	Tournament	Tier	Surface	Partner	Opponents	Score
Win	1–0	Mar 2014	Brasil Open, Brazil	250 Series	Clay (i)	(Spain) Guillermo García López	(Colombia) Juan Sebastián Cabal (Colombia) Robert Farah	5–7, 6–4, [15–13]
Win	2–0	May 2014	Open de Nice Côte d'Azur, France	250 Series	Clay	(Slovakia) Martin Kližan	(India) Rohan Bopanna (Pakistan) Aisam-ul-Haq Qureshi	6–2, 6–0
Loss	2–1	Jul 2014	Stuttgart Open, Germany	250 Series	Clay	(Spain) Guillermo García López	(Poland) Mateusz Kowalczyk (New Zealand) Artem Sitak	6–2, 1–6, [7–10]
Loss	2–2	Jan 2015	Qatar Open, Qatar	250 Series	Hard	(Austria) Julian Knowle	(Argentina) Juan Mónaco (Spain) Rafael Nadal	3–6, 4–6
Win	3–2	Feb 2015	Rio Open, Brazil	500 Series	Clay	(Slovakia) Martin Kližan	(Spain) Pablo Andújar (Austria) Oliver Marach	7–6^{(7–3)}, 6–4
Loss	3–3	Feb 2016	Sofia Open, Bulgaria	250 Series	Hard (i)	(Canada) Adil Shamasdin	(Netherlands) Wesley Koolhof (Netherlands) Matwé Middelkoop	7–5, 6–7^{(9–11)}, [6–10]
Win	4–3	Feb 2017	Ecuador Open, Ecuador	250 Series	Clay	(United States) James Cerretani	(Chile) Julio Peralta (Argentina) Horacio Zeballos	6–3, 2–1 ret.
Win	5–3	Jul 2017	Swiss Open, Switzerland	250 Series	Clay	(Austria) Oliver Marach	(France) Jonathan Eysseric (Croatia) Franko Škugor	6–3, 4–6, [10–8]
Win	6–3	Oct 2017	Kremlin Cup, Russia	250 Series	Hard (i)	(Belarus) Max Mirnyi	(Bosnia and Herzegovina) Damir Džumhur (Croatia) Antonio Šančić	6–3, 7–5
Loss	6–4	Jan 2018	Auckland Open, New Zealand	250 Series	Hard	(Belarus) Max Mirnyi	(Austria) Oliver Marach (Croatia) Mate Pavić	4–6, 7–5, [7–10]
Win	7–4	Feb 2018	New York Open, US	250 Series	Hard (i)	(Belarus) Max Mirnyi	(Netherlands) Wesley Koolhof (New Zealand) Artem Sitak	6–4, 4–6, [10–6]
Win	8–4	Apr 2018	US Clay Court Championships, US	250 Series	Clay	(Belarus) Max Mirnyi	(Germany) Andre Begemann (Croatia) Antonio Šančić	6–7^{(2–7)}, 6–4, [11–9]
Loss	8–5	Oct 2018	Kremlin Cup, Russia (2)	250 Series	Hard (i)	(Belarus) Max Mirnyi	(United States) Austin Krajicek (United States) Rajeev Ram	6–7^{(4–7)}, 4–6
Win	9–5	Jul 2019	Croatia Open, Croatia	250 Series	Clay	(Netherlands) Robin Haase	(Austria) Oliver Marach (Austria) Jürgen Melzer	7–5, 6–7^{(2–7)}, [14–12]
Loss	9–6	Jul 2019	Swiss Open, Switzerland (2)	250 Series	Clay	(Slovakia) Filip Polášek	(Belgium) Sander Gillé (Belgium) Joran Vliegen	4–6, 3–6
Win	10–6	Aug 2019	Austrian Open Kitzbühel, Austria	250 Series	Clay	(Slovakia) Filip Polášek	(Belgium) Sander Gillé (Belgium) Joran Vliegen	6–4, 6–4
Loss	10–7	Jan 2020	Auckland Open, New Zealand	250 Series	Hard	(New Zealand) Marcus Daniell	(United Kingdom) Luke Bambridge (Japan) Ben McLachlan	6–7^{(3–7)}, 3–6
Win	11–7	Oct 2020	Forte Village Sardegna Open, Italy	250 Series	Clay	(New Zealand) Marcus Daniell	(Colombia) Juan Sebastián Cabal (Colombia) Robert Farah	6–3, 6–4
Loss	11–8	Mar 2021	Qatar Open, Qatar	250 Series	Hard	(New Zealand) Marcus Daniell	(Russia) Aslan Karatsev (Russia) Andrey Rublev	5–7, 4–6
Loss	11–9	Oct 2021	Sofia Open, Bulgaria	250 Series	Hard (i)	(Austria) Oliver Marach	(United Kingdom) Jonny O'Mara (United Kingdom) Ken Skupski	3–6, 4–6
Loss	11–10	Jul 2022	Swiss Open Gstaad, Switzerland	250 Series	Clay	(Netherlands) Robin Haase	(Bosnia and Herzegovina) Tomislav Brkić (Portugal) Francisco Cabral	4–6, 4–6
Loss	11–11	Jun 2023	Mallorca Championships, Spain	250 Series	Grass	(Netherlands) Robin Haase	(India) Yuki Bhambri (South Africa) Lloyd Harris	3–6, 4–6

== Challenger and Futures finals ==
=== Singles: 18 (10–8) ===
Legend (singles) ATP Challenger Tour (0–0) ITF Futures Tour (10–8)	Titles by surface Hard (3–2) Clay (6–2) Grass (0–0) Carpet (1–4)

Result	W–L	Date	Tournament	Tier	Surface	Opponent	Score
Win	1–0	Jul 2007	Austria F6, Kramsach	Futures	Clay	(Czech Republic) Jakub Hašek	6–7^{(5–7)}, 6–4, 6–4
Loss	1–1	Feb 2008	Italy F2, Trento	Futures	Hard (i)	(Italy) Paolo Lorenzi	6–7^{(7–9)}, 6–7^{(7–9)}
Win	2–1	Dec 2008	Dominican Republic F3, Santo Domingo	Futures	Hard	(Dominican Republic) Víctor Estrella Burgos	7–6^{(7–2)}, 6–4
Loss	2–2	Mar 2009	Switzerland F2, Greifensee	Futures	Carpet (i)	(Estonia) Jürgen Zopp	3–6, 7–6^{(7–5)}, 3–6
Win	3–2	Jun 2009	Italy F13, Bergamo	Futures	Clay	(Colombia) Juan Sebastián Cabal	6–3, 1–6, 6–2
Win	4–2	Jun 2009	Italy F15, Padova	Futures	Clay	(Italy) Antonio Comporto	6–3, 6–3
Loss	4–3	Aug 2009	Italy F23, Bolzano	Futures	Clay	(Slovakia) Martin Kližan	3–6, 4–6
Win	5–3	Sep 2010	Bulgaria F6, Dobrich	Futures	Clay	(Romania) Petru-Alexandru Luncanu	6–3, 6–1
Loss	5–4	Jan 2011	Germany F1, Schwieberdingen	Futures	Carpet (i)	(Latvia) Andis Juška	6–3, 6–7^{(5–7)}, 4–6
Win	6–4	Jun 2011	Italy F14, Padova	Futures	Clay	(Spain) Gerard Granollers Pujol	6–4, 6–3
Win	7–4	Jul 2011	Italy F20, La Spezia	Futures	Clay	(Italy) Alessandro Giannessi	6–3, 4–6, 6–2
Win	8–4	Sep 2011	Italy F27, Porto Torres	Futures	Hard	(Italy) Massimo Capone	6–3, 7–5
Win	9–4	Sep 2011	Italy F28, Brusaporto	Futures	Carpet (i)	(Italy) Luca Vanni	4–6, 6–4, 6–3
Loss	9–5	Oct 2011	Turkey F25, Antalya	Futures	Hard	(Russia) Ervand Gasparyan	7–6^{(9–7)}, 4–6, 3–6
Win	10–5	Oct 2011	Turkey F26, Antalya	Futures	Hard	(Czech Republic) Michal Konečný	6–4, 6–1
Loss	10–6	Feb 2012	Germany F4, Nußloch	Futures	Carpet (i)	(Germany) Nils Langer	6–7^{(0–7)}, 6–7^{(2–7)}
Loss	10–7	Apr 2012	Switzerland F3, Fällanden	Futures	Carpet (i)	(United Kingdom) Josh Goodall	4–6, 2–6
Loss	10–8	Apr 2012	Italy F5, Padova	Futures	Clay	(Germany) Bastian Knittel	3–6, 3–6

=== Doubles: 82 (55–28) ===
Legend (doubles) ATP Challenger Tour (35–15) ITF Futures Tour (20–13)	Titles by surface Hard (10–13) Clay (37–13) Grass (0–0) Carpet (8–2)

Result	W–L	Date	Tournament	Tier	Surface	Partner	Opponents	Score
Loss	0–1	Aug 2005	Romania F16, Arad	Futures	Clay	(Romania) Bogdan-Victor Leonte	(Romania) Adrian Barbu (Romania) Ionuț Moldovan	4–6, 2–6
Loss	0–2	Oct 2005	Venezuela F4, Caracas	Futures	Hard	(Austria) Martin Fischer	(Brazil) Marcelo Melo (Brazil) Márcio Torres	2–6, 6–3, 4–6
Loss	0–3	Oct 2005	Venezuela F5, Caracas	Futures	Hard	(Austria) Martin Fischer	(Cuba) Ricardo Chile-Fonte (Cuba) Sandor Martínez-Breijo	7–6^{(7–5)}, 6–7^{(3–7)}, 3–6
Loss	0–4	Feb 2006	Poland F1, Szczecin	Futures	Hard (i)	(Austria) Martin Fischer	(Poland) Tomasz Bednarek (Poland) Maciej Diłaj	2–6, 6–4, 3–6
Win	1–4	May 2006	Romania F1, Bucharest	Futures	Clay	(Austria) Martin Fischer	(Italy) Riccardo Ghedin (Czech Republic) Dušan Karol	3–6, 6–0, 7–6^{(7–3)}
Loss	1–5	May 2006	Romania F2, Bucharest	Futures	Clay	(Austria) Martin Fischer	(Romania) Adrian Barbu (Romania) Victor Ioniță	4–6, 0–6
Win	2–5	Jul 2006	Austria F5, Telfs	Futures	Clay	(Austria) Martin Fischer	(Austria) Christian Magg (Austria) Patrick Schmölzer	6–0, 6–3
Win	3–5	Jul 2006	Austria F6, Kramsach	Futures	Clay	(Austria) Martin Fischer	(Austria) Konstantin Gruber (Austria) Christian Magg	6–4, 7–6^{(7–2)}
Win	4–5	Aug 2006	Austria F8, Pörtschach	Futures	Clay	(Austria) Martin Fischer	(Austria) Christoph Lessiak (Slovenia) Miha Mlakar	6–3, 2–6, 6–2
Win	5–5	Sep 2006	Germany F15, Kempten	Futures	Clay	(Austria) Martin Fischer	(Australia) Rameez Junaid (Germany) Philipp Marx	6–3, 1–6, 7–6^{(7–1)}
Win	6–5	Jan 2007	Austria F1, Bergheim	Futures	Carpet (i)	(Austria) Martin Fischer	(Croatia) Nikola Martinović (Croatia) Joško Topić	6–4, 6–4
Win	7–5	Jan 2007	Austria F2, Bergheim	Futures	Carpet (i)	(Austria) Martin Fischer	(Austria) Christian Magg (Austria) Patrick Schmölzer	6–2, 6–2
Win	8–5	Feb 2007	Austria F3, Bergheim	Futures	Carpet (i)	(Austria) Martin Fischer	(Austria) Andreas Haider-Maurer (Austria) Armin Sandbichler	7–6^{(11–9)}, 6–2
Win	9–5	Jul 2007	Austria F4, Vandans	Futures	Clay	(Austria) Armin Sandbichler	(Austria) Tobias Köck (Romania) Bogdan-Victor Leonte	6–4, 3–6, 7–6^{(10–8)}
Win	10–5	Jul 2007	Austria F6, Kramsach	Futures	Clay	(Austria) Armin Sandbichler	(Czech Republic) Dušan Karol (Czech Republic) Filip Zeman	7–6^{(7–3)}, 6–4
Win	11–5	Aug 2007	Austria F7, Altenstadt	Futures	Clay	(Austria) Martin Fischer	(Austria) Max Raditschnigg (Austria) Patrick Schmölzer	5–7, 6–2, 7–5
Win	12–5	Aug 2007	Austria F8, Irdning	Futures	Clay	(Austria) Christoph Steiner	(Croatia) Luka Belić (Croatia) Antonio Veić	7–6^{(7–5)}, 6–2
Win	13–5	Sep 2007	Great Britain F17, Nottingham	Futures	Hard	(Austria) Martin Fischer	(United Kingdom) Josh Goodall (United Kingdom) Tom Rushby	6–2, 7–6^{(9–7)}
Loss	13–6	Oct 2007	India F9, Bellary	Futures	Hard	(Austria) Rainer Eitzinger	(India) Vivek Shokeen (India) Ashutosh Singh	6–7^{(4–7)}, 6–3, [5–10]
Loss	13–7	Jun 2008	Braunschweig, Germany	Challenger	Clay	(Austria) Werner Eschauer	(Italy) Marco Crugnola (Spain) Óscar Hernández Pérez	6–7^{(4–7)}, 2–6
Loss	13–8	Aug 2008	Karshi, Uzbekistan	Challenger	Hard	(Austria) Andreas Haider-Maurer	(Poland) Łukasz Kubot (Austria) Oliver Marach	4–6, 4–6
Win	14–8	Sep 2008	Grenoble, France	Challenger	Hard (i)	(Austria) Martin Fischer	(Belgium) Niels Desein (Belgium) Dick Norman	6–7^{(5–7)}, 7–5, [10–7]
Win	15–8	Dec 2008	Dominican Republic F3, Santo Domingo	Futures	Hard	(Ukraine) Ivan Anikanov	(Russia) Andrey Kumantsov (United States) Sheeva Parbhu	6–2, 6–4
Loss	15–9	Dec 2008	Dominican Republic F4, Santo Domingo	Futures	Hard	(Ukraine) Ivan Anikanov	(Netherlands) Antal van der Duim (Netherlands) Tim van Terheijden	3–6, 7–5, [8–10]
Win	16–9	Mar 2009	Switzerland F2, Greifensee	Futures	Carpet (i)	(Switzerland) Henri Laaksonen	(Jamaica) Dustin Brown (Switzerland) Alexander Sadecky	6–1, 6–4
Loss	16–10	Jul 2009	Oberstaufen, Germany	Challenger	Clay	(Germany) Michael Berrer	(Germany) Dieter Kindlmann (Germany) Marcel Zimmermann	4–6, 6–2, [4–10]
Win	17–10	Jul 2009	Austria F4, Telfs	Futures	Clay	(Austria) Gerald Melzer	(Czech Republic) Roman Jebavý (Poland) Mateusz Kowalczyk	7–5, 4–6, [10–7]
Loss	17–11	Aug 2009	Geneva, Switzerland	Challenger	Clay	(Switzerland) Henri Laaksonen	(Argentina) Diego Álvarez (Argentina) Juan-Martín Aranguren	4–6, 6–4, [2–10]
Win	18–11	Sep 2009	Todi, Italy	Challenger	Clay	(Austria) Martin Fischer	(Spain) Pablo Santos González (Spain) Gabriel Trujillo Soler	7–5, 6–3
Win	19–11	Sep 2009	Palermo, Italy	Challenger	Clay	(Austria) Martin Fischer	(Canada) Pierre-Ludovic Duclos (Brazil) Rogério Dutra Silva	6–3, 7–6^{(7–4)}
Win	20–11	Oct 2009	Kolding, Denmark	Challenger	Hard (i)	(Austria) Martin Fischer	(United Kingdom) Jonathan Marray (Pakistan) Aisam Qureshi	7–5, 6–3
Win	21–11	Feb 2010	Bosnia & Herzegovina F1, Sarajevo	Futures	Carpet (i)	(Austria) Alexander Peya	(Germany) Martin Emmrich (Sweden) Andreas Siljeström	6–3, 7–6^{(7–2)}
Win	22–11	Mar 2010	Kyoto, Japan	Challenger	Carpet (i)	(Austria) Martin Fischer	(India) Divij Sharan (India) Vishnu Vardhan	6–1, 6–2
Loss	22–12	Apr 2010	Bogotá, Colombia	Challenger	Clay	(Germany) Dominik Meffert	(Brazil) Franco Ferreiro (Mexico) Santiago González	3–6, 7–5, [7–10]
Win	23–12	Apr 2010	Pereira, Colombia	Challenger	Clay	(Germany) Dominik Meffert	(Germany) Gero Kretschmer (Germany) Alexander Satschko	6–7^{(4–7)}, 7–6^{(8–6)}, [10–5]
Win	24–12	May 2010	Ostrava, Czech Republic	Challenger	Clay	(Austria) Martin Fischer	(Poland) Tomasz Bednarek (Poland) Mateusz Kowalczyk	2–6, 7–6^{(8–6)}, [10–8]
Win	25–12	Jun 2010	Reggio Emilia, Italy	Challenger	Clay	(Austria) Martin Slanar	(Australia) Sadik Kadir (India) Purav Raja	6–2, 5–7, [10–6]
Loss	25–13	Aug 2010	Geneva, Switzerland	Challenger	Clay	(Austria) Martin Slanar	(Germany) Gero Kretschmer (Germany) Alexander Satschko	3–6, 6–4, [9–11]
Loss	25–14	Sep 2010	Morocco F7, Tanger	Futures	Clay	(Netherlands) Tim van Terheijden	(Spain) Gerard Granollers Pujol (Spain) Carlos Poch Gradin	2–6, 3–6
Win	26–14	Oct 2010	Palermo, Italy	Challenger	Clay	(Austria) Martin Fischer	(Italy) Alessandro Motti (Italy) Simone Vagnozzi	4–6, 6–2, [10–6]
Loss	26–15	Apr 2011	Italy F5, Vercelli	Futures	Clay	(Austria) Bertram Steinberger	(Italy) Erik Crepaldi (Croatia) Ante Pavić	6–7^{(4–7)}, 7–6^{(7–4)}, [5–10]
Loss	26–16	Apr 2011	Italy F8, Sanremo	Futures	Clay	(Austria) Bertram Steinberger	(Italy) Erik Crepaldi (Italy) Claudio Grassi	6–7^{(6–8)}, 7–6^{(7–3)}, [3–10]
Win	27–16	May 2011	Alessandria, Italy	Challenger	Clay	(Austria) Martin Fischer	(South Africa) Jeff Coetzee (Sweden) Andreas Siljeström	6–7^{(6–8)}, 7–5, [10–6]
Win	28–16	Jul 2011	Turin, Italy	Challenger	Clay	(Austria) Martin Fischer	(Belarus) Uladzimir Ignatik (Slovakia) Martin Kližan	6–3, 6–4
Win	29–16	Jul 2011	Oberstaufen, Germany	Challenger	Clay	(Austria) Martin Fischer	(Poland) Tomasz Bednarek (Poland) Mateusz Kowalczyk	7–6^{(7–1)}, 6–3
Win	30–16	Aug 2011	Italy F23, Este	Futures	Clay	(Germany) Simon Stadler	(Australia) Nima Roshan (New Zealand) Jose Statham	6–3, 6–3
Win	31–16	Sep 2011	Italy F27, Porto Torres	Futures	Hard	(Austria) Nikolaus Moser	(Italy) Erik Crepaldi (Italy) Claudio Grassi	6–4, 6–1
Win	32–16	Nov 2011	Salzburg, Austria	Challenger	Hard (i)	(Austria) Martin Fischer	(Germany) Alexander Waske (Croatia) Lovro Zovko	6–3, 3–6, [14–12]
Loss	32–17	Jan 2012	Germany F3, Kaarst	Futures	Carpet (i)	(Italy) Marco Crugnola	(Germany) Alexander Flock (Germany) Nils Langer	4–6, 3–6
Loss	32–18	Feb 2012	Bergamo, Italy	Challenger	Hard (i)	(Austria) Martin Fischer	(United Kingdom) Jamie Delgado (United Kingdom) Ken Skupski	5–7, 5–7
Loss	32–19	Mar 2012	France F4, Lille	Futures	Hard (i)	(Germany) Nils Langer	(France) Romain Jouan (France) Fabrice Martin	2–6, 2–6
Win	33–19	Mar 2012	Bath, Great Britain	Challenger	Hard (i)	(Austria) Martin Fischer	(United Kingdom) Jamie Delgado (United Kingdom) Ken Skupski	6–4, 6–4
Loss	33–20	Apr 2012	Switzerland F3, Fällanden	Futures	Carpet (i)	(Switzerland) Adrian Bodmer	(New Zealand) Marcus Daniell (Hungary) Márton Fucsovics	7–6^{(7–3)}, 3–6, [8–10]
Loss	33–21	Sep 2012	Genova, Italy	Challenger	Clay	(Germany) Dominik Meffert	(Germany) Andre Begemann (Germany) Martin Emmrich	3–6, 1–6
Win	34–21	Sep 2012	Todi, Italy	Challenger	Clay	(Austria) Martin Fischer	(Italy) Marco Cecchinato (Italy) Alessio di Mauro	6–3, 6–2
Win	35–21	Nov 2012	Yokohama, Japan	Challenger	Hard	(India) Prakash Amritraj	(Thailand) Sanchai Ratiwatana (Thailand) Sonchat Ratiwatana	6–3, 6–4
Win	36–21	Nov 2012	Toyota, Japan	Challenger	Carpet (i)	(Croatia) Mate Pavić	(Italy) Andrea Arnaboldi (Italy) Matteo Viola	6–3, 3–6, [10–2]
Win	37–21	Feb 2013	Germany F4, Nußloch	Futures	Carpet (i)	(Germany) Bastian Knittel	(Serbia) Ivan Bjelica (Netherlands) Sander Groen	6–2, 7–5
Win	38–21	May 2013	Tunis, Tunisia	Challenger	Clay	(Germany) Dominik Meffert	(United Kingdom) Jamie Delgado (Sweden) Andreas Siljeström	3–6, 7–6^{(7–0)}, [10–7]
Win	39–21	Jun 2013	Caltanissetta, Italy	Challenger	Clay	(Germany) Dominik Meffert	(Italy) Alessandro Giannessi (Italy) Potito Starace	6–2, 6–3
Win	40–21	Jul 2013	Oberstaufen, Germany	Challenger	Clay	(Germany) Dominik Meffert	(Netherlands) Stephan Fransen (New Zealand) Artem Sitak	6–1, 3–6, [14–12]
Win	41–21	Sep 2013	Sibiu, Romania	Challenger	Clay	(Australia) Rameez Junaid	(United Kingdom) Jamie Delgado (Australia) Jordan Kerr	6–4, 6–4
Loss	41–22	Nov 2013	Geneva, Switzerland	Challenger	Hard	(Czech Republic) František Čermák	(Austria) Oliver Marach (Romania) Florin Mergea	4–6, 3–6
Win	42–22	Nov 2013	Andria, Italy	Challenger	Hard (i)	(Sweden) Andreas Siljeström	(Italy) Alessandro Motti (Serbia) Goran Tošić	6–2, 6–3
Loss	42–23	Nov 2014	Geneva, Switzerland	Challenger	Hard	(Austria) Oliver Marach	(Sweden) Johan Brunström (United States) Nicholas Monroe	7–5, 5–7, [6–10]
Win	43–23	Jun 2015	Prostějov, Czech Republic	Challenger	Clay	(Austria) Julian Knowle	(Poland) Mateusz Kowalczyk (Slovakia) Igor Zelenay	4–6, 6–3, [11–9]
Loss	43–24	Mar 2016	Kazan, Russia	Challenger	Hard (i)	(Russia) Konstantin Kravchuk	(Belarus) Aliaksandr Bury (Slovakia) Igor Zelenay	2–6, 6–4, [6–10]
Loss	43–25	Apr 2016	Raanana, Israel	Challenger	Hard	(Israel) Jonathan Erlich	(Russia) Konstantin Kravchuk (Ukraine) Denys Molchanov	6–4, 6–7^{(1–7)}, [4–10]
Win	44–25	May 2016	Aix-en-Provence, France	Challenger	Clay	(Austria) Oliver Marach	(Argentina) Guillermo Durán (Argentina) Máximo González	6–1, 4–6, [10–7]
Win	45–25	Jul 2016	Marburg, Germany	Challenger	Clay	(United States) James Cerretani	(Mexico) Miguel Ángel Reyes-Varela (United States) Max Schnur	6–3, 6–2
Win	46–25	Jul 2016	Braunschweig, Germany	Challenger	Clay	(United States) James Cerretani	(Poland) Mateusz Kowalczyk (Croatia) Antonio Šančić	4–6, 7–6^{(7–5)}, [10–2]
Win	47–25	Aug 2016	Cortina d'Ampezzo, Italy	Challenger	Clay	(United States) James Cerretani	(Spain) Roberto Carballés Baena (Chile) Christian Garín	6–3, 6–2
Loss	47–26	Oct 2016	Budapest, Hungary	Challenger	Hard (i)	(United States) James Cerretani	(Belarus) Aliaksandr Bury (Sweden) Andreas Siljeström	6–7^{(3–7)}, 4–6
Win	48–26	May 2019	Rome, Italy	Challenger	Clay	(Slovakia) Filip Polášek	(Serbia) Nikola Čačić (Czech Republic) Adam Pavlásek	w/o
Win	49–26	May 2019	Lisbon, Portugal	Challenger	Clay	(Slovakia) Filip Polášek	(Argentina) Guido Andreozzi (Argentina) Guillermo Durán	7–5, 6–2
Win	50–26	Jun 2019	Prostějov, Czech Republic	Challenger	Clay	(Slovakia) Filip Polášek	(Czech Republic) Jiří Lehečka (Czech Republic) Jiří Veselý	6–4, 7–6^{(7–4)}
Win	51–26	Jun 2019	Lyon, France	Challenger	Clay	(Slovakia) Filip Polášek	(Italy) Simone Bolelli (Italy) Andrea Pellegrino	6–4, 7–6^{(7–2)}
Loss	51–27	March 2022	Roseto degli Abruzzi, Italy	Challenger	Clay	(Czech Republic) Roman Jebavý	(Monaco) Hugo Nys (Poland) Jan Zieliński	6–7^{(2–7)}, 6–4, [3–10]
Win	52–27	Mar 2022	Marbella, Spain	Challenger	Clay	(Czech Republic) Roman Jebavý	(Monaco) Hugo Nys (Poland) Jan Zieliński	7–6^{(8–6)}, 3–6, [10–3]
Win	53–27	Aug 2022	Liberec, Czezch Republic	Challenger	Clay	(Austria) Neil Oberleitner	(Czech Republic) Roman Jebavý (Czech Republic) Adam Pavlásek	7–6^{(7–5)}, 6–2
Loss	53–28	Aug 2022	Meerbusch, Germany	Challenger	Clay	(Austria) Neil Oberleitner	(Netherlands) David Pel (Poland) Szymon Walków	5–7, 1–6
Win	54–28	Aug 2022	Grodzisk Mazowiecki, Poland	Challenger	Hard	(Netherlands) Robin Haase	(Monaco) Hugo Nys (France) Fabien Reboul	6–3, 6–4
Win	55–28	Aug 2023	Banja Luka, Bosnia and Herzegovina	Challenger	Clay	(Romania) Victor Vlad Cornea	(Kazakhstan) Andrey Golubev (Ukraine) Denys Molchanov	3–6, 6–1, [15–13]

== Doubles performance timeline ==
Key
W	F	SF	QF	#R	RR	Q#	DNQ	A	NH

(W) winner; (F) finalist; (SF) semifinalist; (QF) quarterfinalist; (#R) rounds 4, 3, 2, 1; (RR) round-robin stage; (Q#) qualification round; (DNQ) did not qualify; (A) absent; (NH) not held; (SR) strike rate (events won / competed); (W–L) win–loss record.
To avoid confusion and double counting, these charts are updated at the conclusion of a tournament or when the player's participation has ended.

Current through the 2023 Wimbledon Championships.

Tournament	2005	2006	2007	2008	2009	2010	2011	2012	2013	2014	2015	2016	2017	2018	2019	2020	2021	2022	2023	SR	W–L
Grand Slam tournaments
Australian Open	A	A	A	A	A	A	A	A	A	2R	1R	1R	1R	2R	1R	1R	QF	1R	1R	0 / 10	5–10
French Open	A	A	A	A	A	A	A	A	A	2R	1R	A	2R	1R	A	1R	2R	1R	1R	0 / 8	3–8
Wimbledon	A	A	A	A	A	Q1	A	Q2	1R	1R	1R	Q1	2R	1R	3R	NH	2R	2R	1R	0 / 9	5–9
US Open	A	A	A	A	A	A	A	A	2R	3R	3R	A	1R	1R	1R	2R	1R	3R		0 / 9	8–9
Win–loss	0–0	0–0	0–0	0–0	0–0	0–0	0–0	0–0	1–2	4–4	2–4	0–1	2–4	1–4	2–3	1–2	5–4	3–4	0–3	0 / 36	21–36
National representation
Davis Cup	A	A	A	A	A	A	A	A	A	Z1	A	Z1	Z1	Z1	A	RR		A		0 / 1	3–4
Career statistics
	2005	2006	2007	2008	2009	2010	2011	2012	2013	2014	2015	2016	2017	2018	2019	2020	2021	2022	2023	Career	
Titles	0	0	0	0	0	0	0	0	0	2	1	0	3	2	2	1	0	0	0	11	
Finals	0	0	0	0	0	0	0	0	0	3	2	1	3	4	3	2	2	1	1	22	
Overall win–loss	0–0	0–2	0–2	4–4	0–2	0–2	1–2	2–2	1–3	21–20	15–21	7–10	24–18	27–22	27–19	13–11	25–25	13–20	8–11	188–196	
Year-end ranking	632	412	261	136	138	104	127	109	81	51	57	71	50	52	41	42	52	68		48.96%	
