= Martin Fischer (tennis) =

Austrian tennis player

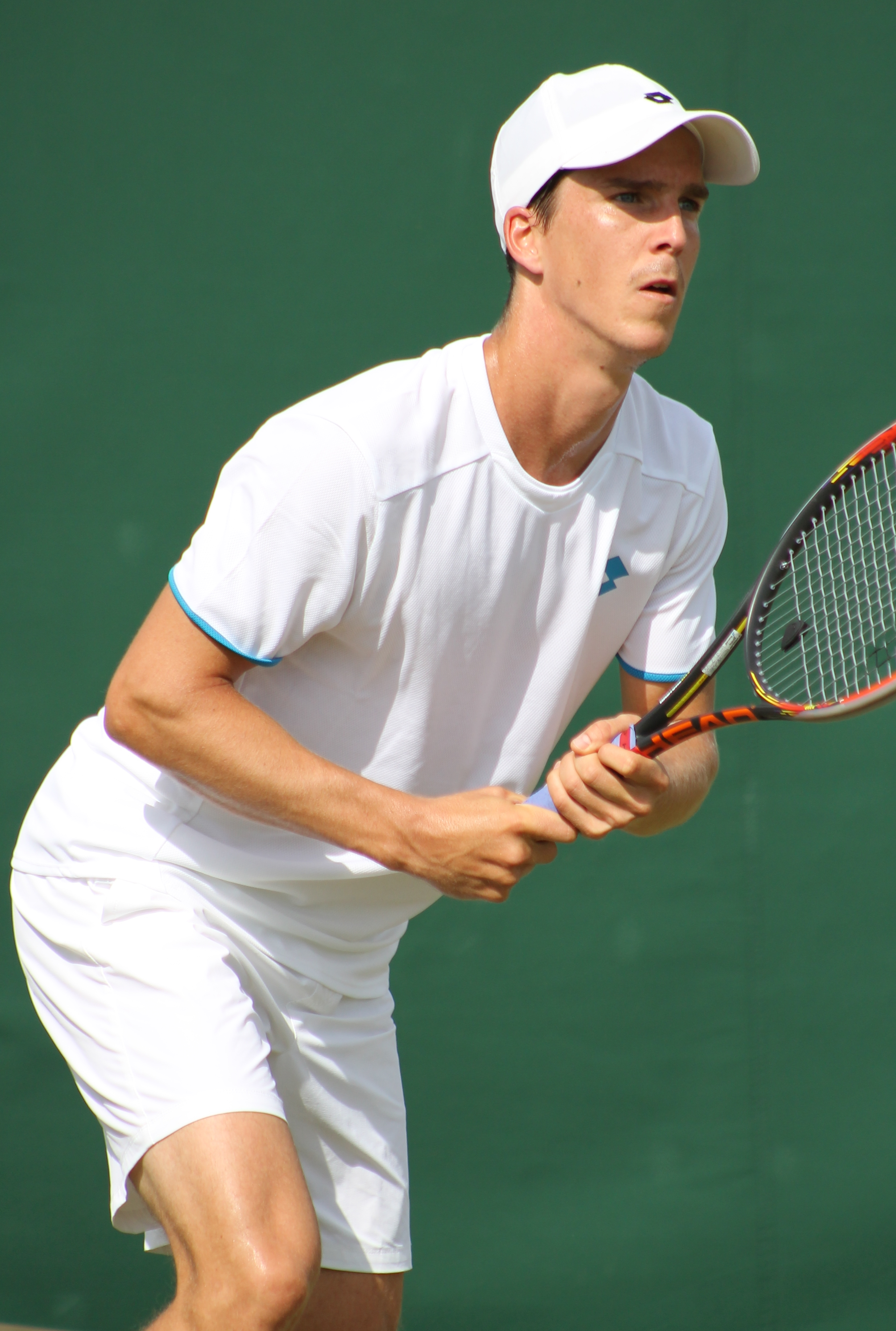
- Country (sports): Austria
- Residence: Wolfurt, Austria
- Born: 21 July 1986 (age 38); Dornbirn, Austria
- Height: 1.80 m (5 ft 11 in)
- Turned pro: 2005
- Retired: 2015
- Plays: Right-handed (two-handed backhand)
- Prize money: $640,889

Singles
- Career record: 5–20
- Career titles: 0
- Highest ranking: No. 117 (11 October 2010)

Grand Slam singles results
- Australian Open: Q3 (2012)
- French Open: 1R (2010)
- Wimbledon: 2R (2010)
- US Open: Q2 (2008)

Doubles
- Career record: 3–11
- Career titles: 0
- Highest ranking: No. 119 (24 May 2010)

Grand Slam doubles results
- Wimbledon: Q1 (2010)
- Last updated on: 18 June 2021.

Martin Fischer (German pronunciation: [ˈmaʁtiːn ˈfɪʃɐ]; born 21 July 1986) is an Austrian retired professional tennis player. His career-high ranking was no. 117 achieved on 11 October 2010.

== Performance timeline ==
Key
| W | F | SF | QF | #R | RR | Q# | DNQ | A | NH |

(W) winner; (F) finalist; (SF) semifinalist; (QF) quarterfinalist; (#R) rounds 4, 3, 2, 1; (RR) round-robin stage; (Q#) qualification round; (DNQ) did not qualify; (A) absent; (NH) not held; (SR) strike rate (events won / competed); (W–L) win–loss record.

=== Singles ===
| Tournament | 2007 | 2008 | 2009 | 2010 | 2011 | 2012 | 2013 | 2014 | SR | W–L | Win% |
|---|---|---|---|---|---|---|---|---|---|---|---|
Grand Slam tournaments
| Australian Open | A | Q2 | Q1 | Q2 | A | Q3 | A | Q2 | 0 / 0 | 0–0 | – |
| French Open | A | Q2 | Q1 | 1R | Q1 | Q2 | Q2 | Q1 | 0 / 1 | 0–1 | 0% |
| Wimbledon | A | Q3 | Q3 | 2R | 1R | Q2 | Q3 | Q3 | 0 / 2 | 1–2 | 33% |
| US Open | Q1 | Q2 | Q1 | Q1 | Q3 | Q1 | Q2 | Q1 | 0 / 0 | 0–0 | – |
| Win–loss | 0–0 | 0–0 | 0–0 | 1–2 | 0–1 | 0–0 | 0–0 | 0–0 | 0 / 3 | 1–3 | 25% |

== ATP Challenger and ITF Futures finals ==
=== Singles: 20 (12–8) ===
| Legend ATP Challenger (2–3) ITF Futures (10–5) | Finals by surface Hard (6–5) Clay (2–3) Grass (1–0) Carpet (3–0) |

| Result | W–L | Date | Tournament | Tier | Surface | Opponent | Score |
|---|---|---|---|---|---|---|---|
| Loss | 0–1 | Nov 2005 | Mexico F18, Querétaro | Futures | Hard | (Brazil) Rodrigo-Antonio Grilli | 4–6, 6–0, 3–6 |
| Win | 1–1 | Aug 2006 | Austria F8, Pörtschach | Futures | Clay | (Austria) Armin Sandbichler | 6–2, 2–6, 6–1 |
| Loss | 1–2 | Aug 2006 | Austria F9, Pörtschach | Futures | Clay | (Slovenia) Marko Tkalec | 6–3, 3–6, 2–6 |
| Win | 2–2 | Sep 2006 | Great Britain F13, Nottingham | Futures | Hard | (Australia) Rameez Junaid | 6–3, 6–3 |
| Win | 3–2 | Jan 2007 | Austria F2, Bergheim | Futures | Carpet | (Austria) Patrick Schmölzer | 6–1, 6–2 |
| Win | 4–2 | Apr 2007 | Russia F2, Tyumen | Futures | Hard | (Russia) Denis Matsukevich | 6–2, 6–3 |
| Win | 5–2 | Sep 2007 | Great Britain F17, Nottingham | Futures | Hard | (Republic of Ireland) Conor Niland | 6–4, 6–3 |
| Win | 6–2 | Sep 2008 | France F13, Bagnères-de-Bigorre | Futures | Hard | (France) David Guez | 6–2, 6–3 |
| Win | 7–2 | Sep 2008 | Great Britain F14, Nottingham | Futures | Hard | (France) Frederic Jeanclaude | 2–6, 7–5, 3–0 ret. |
| Win | 8–2 | Feb 2009 | Croatia F1, Zagreb | Futures | Hard | (Republic of Ireland) Louk Sorensen | 6–3, 6–3 |
| Win | 9–2 | Aug 2009 | Great Britain F10, Ilkley | Futures | Grass | (United Kingdom) Neil Pauffley | 6–2, 6–4 |
| Loss | 9–3 | Nov 2009 | Yokohama, Japan | Challenger | Hard | (Japan) Takao Suzuki | 4–6, 6–7^{(5–7)} |
| Loss | 9–4 | Apr 2010 | Italy F4, Vercelli | Futures | Clay | (Netherlands) Thomas Schoorel | 4–6, 3–6 |
| Win | 10–4 | Jul 2010 | Oberstaufen, Germany | Challenger | Clay | (Germany) Cedrik-Marcel Stebe | 6–3, 6–4 |
| Loss | 10–5 | Oct 2010 | Palermo, Italy | Challenger | Clay | (Hungary) Attila Balázs | 6–7^{(4–7)}, 6–2, 1–6 |
| Win | 11–5 | Mar 2013 | Switzerland F3, Taverne | Futures | Carpet | (Lithuania) Laurynas Grigelis | 7–6^{(7–4)}, 6–1 |
| Loss | 11–6 | Jul 2013 | Portorož, Slovenia | Challenger | Hard | (Slovenia) Grega Žemlja | 4–6, 5–7 |
| Win | 12–6 | Mar 2014 | Kyoto, Japan | Challenger | Carpet | (Japan) Tatsuma Ito | 3–6, 7–5, 6–4 |
| Loss | 12–7 | Apr 2015 | Egypt F13, Sharm El Sheikh | Futures | Hard | (South Africa) Tucker Vorster | 5–7, 5–7 |
| Loss | 12–8 | Apr 2015 | Egypt F14, Sharm El Sheikh | Futures | Hard | (Austria) Dennis Novak | 6–2, 1–6, 3–6 |

=== Doubles: 46 (30–16) ===
| Legend ATP Challenger (15–8) ITF Futures (15–8) | Finals by surface Hard (8–7) Clay (15–7) Grass (2–0) Carpet (5–2) |

| Result | W–L | Date | Tournament | Tier | Surface | Partner | Opponents | Score |
|---|---|---|---|---|---|---|---|---|
| Loss | 0–1 | Aug 2005 | Italy F27, San Benedetto del Tronto | Futures | Clay | (Austria) Thomas Weindorfer | (Czech Republic) Josef Neštický (Italy) Federico Torresi | 2–6, 2–6 |
| Loss | 0–2 | Oct 2005 | Venezuela F4, Caracas | Futures | Hard | (Austria) Philipp Oswald | (Brazil) Marcelo Melo (Brazil) Márcio Torres | 2–6, 6–3, 4–6 |
| Loss | 0–3 | Oct 2005 | Venezuela F5, Caracas | Futures | Hard | (Austria) Philipp Oswald | (Cuba) Ricardo Chile-Fonte (Cuba) Sandor Martinez-Breijo | 7–6^{(7–5)}, 6–7^{(3–7)}, 3–6 |
| Loss | 0–4 | Feb 2006 | Poland F1, Szczecin | Futures | Hard | (Austria) Philipp Oswald | (Poland) Tomasz Bednarek (Poland) Maciej Diłaj | 2–6, 6–4, 3–6 |
| Win | 1–4 | May 2006 | Romania F1, Bucharest | Futures | Clay | (Austria) Philipp Oswald | (Italy) Riccardo Ghedin (Czech Republic) Dušan Karol | 3–6, 6–0, 7–6^{(7–3)} |
| Loss | 1–5 | May 2006 | Romania F2, Bucharest | Futures | Clay | (Austria) Philipp Oswald | (Romania) Victor Ioniță (Romania) Adrian Barbu | 4–6, 0–6 |
| Win | 2–5 | Jul 2006 | Austria F5, Telfs | Futures | Clay | (Austria) Philipp Oswald | (Austria) Christian Magg (Austria) Patrick Schmölzer | 6–0, 6–3 |
| Win | 3–5 | Jul 2006 | Austria F6, Kramsach | Futures | Clay | (Austria) Philipp Oswald | (Austria) Christian Magg (Austria) Konstantin Gruber | 6–4, 7–6^{(7–2)} |
| Win | 4–5 | Aug 2006 | Austria F8, Pörtschach | Futures | Clay | (Austria) Philipp Oswald | (Austria) Christoph Lessiak-Collé (Slovenia) Miha Mlakar | 6–3, 2–6, 6–2 |
| Win | 5–5 | Sep 2006 | Germany F15, Kempten | Futures | Clay | (Austria) Philipp Oswald | (Australia) Rameez Junaid (Germany) Philipp Marx | 6–3, 1–6, 7–6^{(7–1)} |
| Win | 6–5 | Jan 2007 | Austria F1, Bergheim | Futures | Carpet | (Austria) Philipp Oswald | (Croatia) Nikola Martinovic (Croatia) Joško Topić | 6–4, 6–4 |
| Win | 7–5 | Jan 2007 | Austria F2, Bergheim | Futures | Carpet | (Austria) Philipp Oswald | (Austria) Christian Magg (Austria) Patrick Schmölzer | 6–2, 6–2 |
| Win | 8–5 | Feb 2007 | Austria F3, Bergheim | Futures | Carpet | (Austria) Philipp Oswald | (Austria) Andreas Haider-Maurer (Austria) Armin Sandbichler | 7–6^{(11–9)}, 6–2 |
| Win | 9–5 | Aug 2007 | Austria F7, Altenstadt | Futures | Clay | (Austria) Philipp Oswald | (Austria) Max Raditschnigg (Austria) Patrick Schmölzer | 5–7, 6–2, 7–5 |
| Win | 10–5 | Sep 2007 | Great Britain F17, Nottingham | Futures | Hard | (Austria) Philipp Oswald | (United Kingdom) Josh Goodall (United Kingdom) Tom Rushby | 6–3, 7–6^{(9–7)} |
| Loss | 10–6 | Aug 2008 | Bronx, United States | Challenger | Hard | (Germany) Andreas Beck | (Czech Republic) Lukáš Dlouhý (Czech Republic) Tomáš Zíb | 6–3, 4–6, [9–11] |
| Win | 11–6 | Sep 2008 | Great Britain F14, Nottingham | Futures | Hard | (France) Jeremy Blandin | (Republic of Ireland) Colin O'Brien (United Kingdom) Colin Fleming | 6–0, 2–6, [11–9] |
| Win | 12–6 | Sep 2008 | Grenoble, France | Challenger | Hard | (Austria) Philipp Oswald | (Belgium) Niels Desein (Belgium) Dick Norman | 6–7^{(5–7)}, 7–5, [10–7] |
| Loss | 12–7 | Mar 2009 | Cherbourg, France | Challenger | Hard | (Austria) Martin Slanar | (France) Arnaud Clément (France) Édouard Roger-Vasselin | 6–4, 2–6, [3–10] |
| Win | 13–7 | Aug 2009 | Great Britain F10, Ilkley | Futures | Grass | (United Kingdom) Chris Eaton | (Australia) Sadik Kadir (India) Purav Raja | 7–5, 3–6, [10–6] |
| Win | 14–7 | Sep 2009 | Todi, Italy | Challenger | Clay | (Austria) Philipp Oswald | (Spain) Pablo Santos González (Spain) Gabriel Trujillo Soler | 7–5, 6–3 |
| Win | 15–7 | Sep 2009 | Palermo, Italy | Challenger | Clay | (Austria) Philipp Oswald | (Canada) Pierre-Ludovic Duclos (Brazil) Rogério Dutra Silva | 6–3, 7–6^{(7–4)} |
| Win | 16–7 | Oct 2009 | Kolding, Denmark | Challenger | Hard | (Austria) Philipp Oswald | (United Kingdom) Jonathan Marray (Pakistan) Aisam Qureshi | 7–5, 6–3 |
| Win | 17–7 | Mar 2010 | Kyoto, Japan | Challenger | Carpet | (Austria) Philipp Oswald | (India) Divij Sharan (India) Vishnu Vardhan | 6–1, 6–2 |
| Loss | 17–8 | Apr 2010 | Monza, Italy | Challenger | Clay | (Denmark) Frederik Nielsen | (Italy) Daniele Bracciali (Spain) David Marrero | 3–6, 3–6 |
| Win | 18–8 | May 2010 | Ostrava, Czech Republic | Challenger | Clay | (Austria) Philipp Oswald | (Poland) Mateusz Kowalczyk (Poland) Tomasz Bednarek | 2–6, 7–6^{(8–6)}, [10–8] |
| Win | 19–8 | Oct 2010 | Palermo, Italy | Challenger | Clay | (Austria) Philipp Oswald | (Italy) Alessandro Motti (Italy) Simone Vagnozzi | 4–6, 6–2, [10–6] |
| Loss | 19–9 | Apr 2011 | Barletta, Italy | Challenger | Clay | (Austria) Andreas Haider-Maurer | (Czech Republic) Lukáš Rosol (Slovakia) Igor Zelenay | 3–6, 2–6 |
| Win | 20–9 | May 2011 | Alessandrio, Italy | Challenger | Clay | (Austria) Philipp Oswald | (South Africa) Jeff Coetzee (Sweden) Andreas Siljeström | 6–7^{(5–7)}, 7–5, [10–6] |
| Win | 21–9 | Jul 2011 | Turin, Italy | Challenger | Clay | (Austria) Philipp Oswald | (Belarus) Uladzimir Ignatik (Slovakia) Martin Kližan | 6–2, 6–4 |
| Win | 22–9 | Jul 2011 | Oberstaufen, Germany | Challenger | Clay | (Austria) Philipp Oswald | (Poland) Tomasz Bednarek (Poland) Mateusz Kowalczyk | 7–6^{(7–1)}, 6–3 |
| Loss | 22–10 | Sep 2011 | Todi, Italy | Challenger | Clay | (Italy) Alessandro Motti | (Italy) Stefano Ianni (Italy) Luca Vanni | 4–6, 6–1, [9–11] |
| Win | 23–10 | Nov 2011 | Salzburg, Austria | Challenger | Hard | (Austria) Philipp Oswald | (Germany) Alexander Waske (Croatia) Lovro Zovko | 6–3, 3–6, [14–12] |
| Loss | 23–11 | Feb 2012 | Bergamo, Italy | Challenger | Hard | (Austria) Philipp Oswald | (United Kingdom) Jamie Delgado (United Kingdom) Ken Skupski | 5–7, 5–7 |
| Win | 24–11 | Mar 2012 | Bath, United Kingdom | Challenger | Hard | (Austria) Philipp Oswald | (United Kingdom) Jamie Delgado (United Kingdom) Ken Skupski | 6–4, 6–4 |
| Win | 25–11 | Jun 2012 | Nottingham, United Kingdom | Challenger | Grass | (France) Olivier Charroin | (Russia) Evgeny Donskoy (Russia) Andrey Kuznetsov | 6–4, 7–6^{(8–6)} |
| Win | 26–11 | Sep 2012 | Todi, Italy | Challenger | Clay | (Austria) Philipp Oswald | (Italy) Marco Cecchinato (Italy) Alessio di Mauro | 6–3, 6–2 |
| Win | 27–11 | Feb 2013 | Croatia F2, Zagreb | Futures | Hard | (Czech Republic) Jaroslav Pospíšil | (Croatia) Marin Draganja (Croatia) Nikola Mektić | 4–6, 6–2, [10–6] |
| Loss | 27–12 | Mar 2013 | Switzerland F1, Frauenfeld | Futures | Carpet | (Switzerland) Jannis Liniger | (Belgium) Julien Dubail (France) Yannick Jankovits | 3–6, 2–6 |
| Loss | 27–13 | Mar 2013 | Switzerland F2, Vaduz | Futures | Carpet | (Switzerland) Luca Castelnuovo | (Italy) Matteo Volante (Italy) Edoardo Eremin | 1–6, 4–6 |
| Win | 28–13 | Mar 2013 | Switzerland F3, Taverne | Futures | Carpet | (Switzerland) Jannis Liniger | (Italy) Lorenzo Frigerio (Italy) Matteo Trevisan | 6–4, 7–6^{(7–4)} |
| Win | 29–13 | Apr 2013 | Rome, Italy | Challenger | Clay | (Germany) Andreas Beck | (Australia) Rameez Junaid (Germany) Martin Emmrich | 7–6^{(7–2)}, 6–0 |
| Loss | 29–14 | May 2014 | Aix En Provence, France | Challenger | Clay | (Germany) Andreas Beck | (Argentina) Diego Schwartzman (Argentina) Horacio Zeballos | 4–6, 6–3, [5–10] |
| Loss | 29–15 | Jul 2014 | Scheveningen, Netherlands | Challenger | Clay | (Netherlands) Jesse Huta Galung | (Netherlands) Matwé Middelkoop (Netherlands) Boy Westerhof | 4–6, 6–3, [6–10] |
| Win | 30–15 | Apr 2015 | Egypt F13, Sharm El Sheikh | Futures | Hard | (Switzerland) Jannis Liniger | (Austria) Lucas Miedler (Russia) Markos Kalovelonis | 6–4, 6–2 |
| Loss | 30–16 | Apr 2015 | Egypt F14, Sharm El Sheikh | Futures | Hard | (Switzerland) Jannis Liniger | (Latvia) Martins Podzus (Latvia) Janis Podzus | 0–6, 6–0, [7–10] |
