= Patrick Schmölzer =

Austrian tennis player (born 1984)

- Country (sports): Austria
- Born: 11 January 1984 (age 42)
- Plays: Right-handed
- Prize money: $33,930

Singles
- Highest ranking: No. 564 (5 Nov 2007)

Doubles
- Career record: 0–3 (ATP Tour)
- Highest ranking: No. 567 (15 Oct 2007)

Patrick Schmölzer (born 11 January 1984) is an Austrian former professional tennis player.

Schmölzer, a Styrian native, reached a best singles world ranking of 564. He featured in three ATP Tour main draws for doubles, competing twice at Kitzbühel and once at Stuttgart. He plays for TC Gleisdorf in the Austrian Bundesliga.

== ITF Futures titles ==
=== Doubles: (2) ===
No.	Date	Tournament	Surface	Partner	Opponents	Score
1.	Aug 2007	Austria F9, Vienna	Clay	(Czech Republic) Dušan Karol	(Spain) Jordi Marse-Vidri (Spain) Oscar Sabate-Bretos	6–3, 6–2
2.	Aug 2007	Austria F10, Pörtschach	Clay	(Austria) Max Raditschnigg	(United States) Christopher Klingemann (Austria) Marc Rath	6–4, 6–3
