= Max Raditschnigg =

Austrian tennis player

- Country (sports): Austria
- Born: 6 May 1983 (age 41)
- Plays: Left-handed (two-handed backhand)
- Prize money: $69,982

Singles
- Career record: 0–0 (at ATP Tour level, Grand Slam level, and in Davis Cup)
- Career titles: 0
- Highest ranking: No. 440 (22 May 2006)

Doubles
- Career record: 0–1 (at ATP Tour level, Grand Slam level, and in Davis Cup)
- Career titles: 0
- Highest ranking: No. 240 (4 April 2011)
- Last updated on: 31 October 2019.

Max Raditschnigg (born 6 May 1983) is a former Austrian tennis player.

Raditschnigg has a career high ATP singles ranking of 440 achieved on 22 May 2006. He also has a career high ATP doubles ranking of 240 achieved on 4 April 2011.

Raditschnigg made his ATP main draw debut at the 2005 Austrian Open in the doubles draw partnering Patrick Schmölzer.
