= Sicilia Classic =

Defunct tennis tournament
- Location: Palermo, Italy
- Venue: Country Time Club
- Category: ATP Challenger Tour
- Surface: Clay
- Draw: 32S / 17Q / 16D
- Prize money: €42,500+H
- Website: Official website

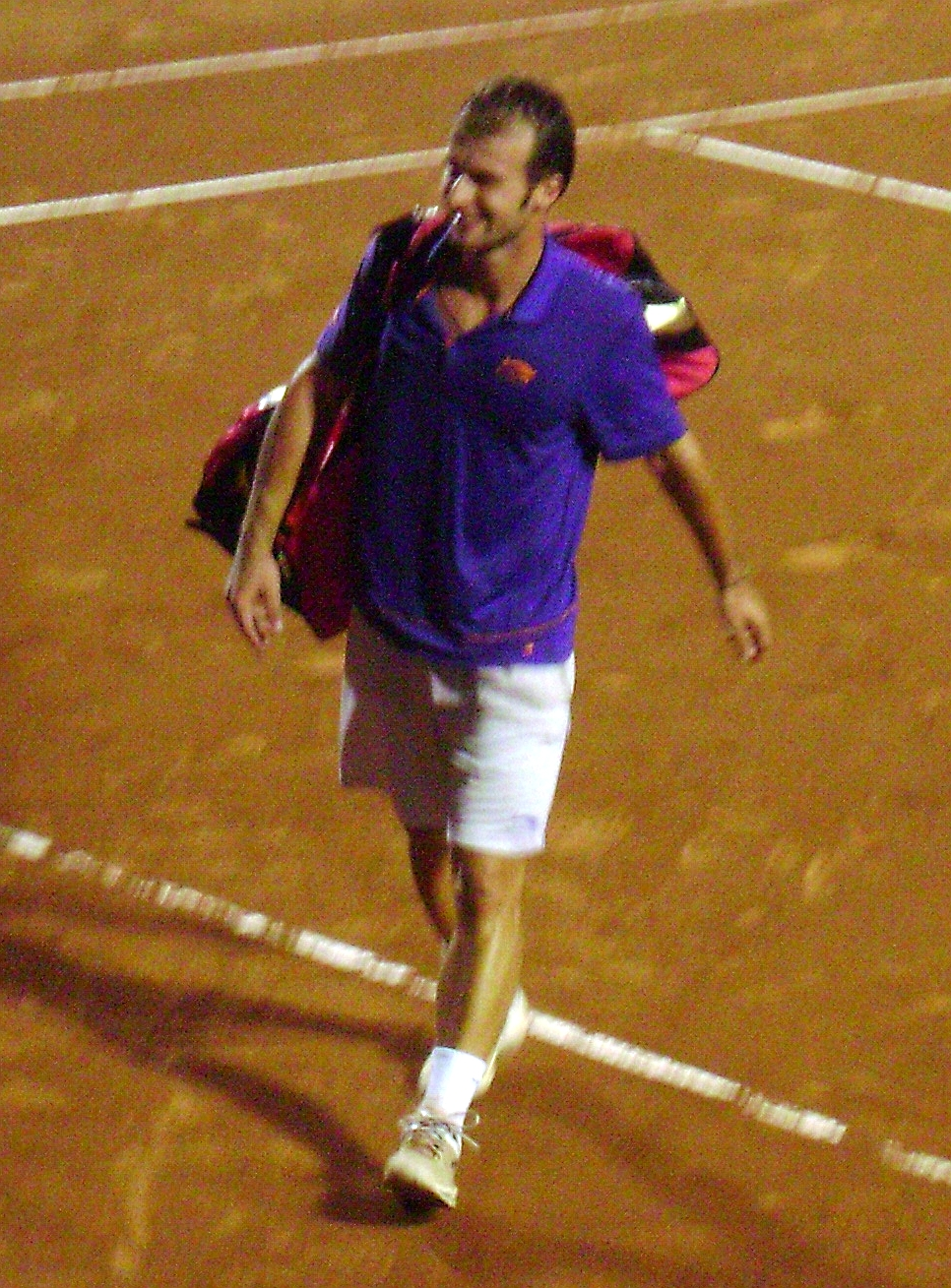
Romanian Adrian Ungur won the inaugural edition in 2009 and reached the final again in 2011.

The Sicilia Classic was a professional tennis tournament played on outdoor red clay courts, held in Palermo, Italy. It was part of the ATP Challenger Tour from 2009 until 2011.

== Past finals ==
=== Singles ===
Year	Champion	Runner-up	Score
2011	(Argentina) Carlos Berlocq	(Romania) Adrian Ungur	6–1, 6–1
2010	(Hungary) Attila Balázs	(Austria) Martin Fischer	7–6^{(7–4)}, 2–6, 6–1
2009	(Romania) Adrian Ungur	(Spain) Albert Ramos-Viñolas	6–4, 6–4

=== Doubles ===
Year	Champions	Runners-up	Score
2011	(Poland) Tomasz Bednarek (Poland) Mateusz Kowalczyk	(Belarus) Aliaksandr Bury (Belarus) Andrei Vasilevski	6–2, 6–4
2010	(Austria) Martin Fischer (Austria) Philipp Oswald	(Italy) Alessandro Motti (Italy) Simone Vagnozzi	4–6, 6–2, [10–6]
2009	(Austria) Martin Fischer (Austria) Philipp Oswald	(Canada) Pierre-Ludovic Duclos (Brazil) Rogério Dutra da Silva	4–6, 6–3, [10–5]
