= 2014 Geneva Open Challenger – Singles =

Singles
- 2014 Geneva Open Challenger

Final
- Champion: (Cyprus) Marcos Baghdatis
- Runner-up: (Poland) Michał Przysiężny
- Score: 6–1, 4–6, 6–3

Events
Singles	Doubles
← 2013 ·	Geneva Open Challenger	· 2015 →

Malek Jaziri was the defending champion, but he did not compete that year.
Marcos Baghdatis won the title, beating Michał Przysiężny in the final, 6–1, 4–6, 6–3.

== Seeds ==
1. (Czech Republic) Jiří Veselý (quarterfinals)
2. (Italy) Simone Bolelli (semifinals)
3. (Slovakia) Lukáš Lacko (second round)
4. (Japan) Tatsuma Ito (second round)
5. (Serbia) Filip Krajinović (second round)
6. (Cyprus) Marcos Baghdatis (champion)
7. (Bosnia and Herzegovina) Damir Džumhur (quarterfinals)
8. (Germany) Peter Gojowczyk (first round)

== Draw ==
=== Key ===
- Q = Qualifier
- WC = Wild card
- LL = Lucky loser
- Alt = Alternate
- SE = Special exempt
- PR = Protected ranking
- ITF = ITF entry
- JE = Junior exempt
- w/o = Walkover
- r = Retired
- d = Defaulted
- SR = Special ranking

=== Finals ===
Semifinals
6	(Cyprus) Marcos Baghdatis	6	6
Q	(Moldova) Radu Albot	3	3
(Poland) Michał Przysiężny	7^{7}	6
2	(Italy) Simone Bolelli	6^{2}	4

Final
6	(Cyprus) Marcos Baghdatis	6	4	6
(Poland) Michał Przysiężny	1	6	3

=== Top half ===
First round
1	(Czech Republic) J Veselý	7^{7}	6
(Austria) G Melzer	6^{1}	3
(Chinese Taipei) J Wang	4	6	7
WC	(Switzerland) M Lammer	6	1	5
WC	(Serbia) V Troicki	6	6
(Italy) M Cecchinato	3	2
(Croatia) A Pavić	4	2
6	(Cyprus) M Baghdatis	6	6
3	(Slovakia) L Lacko	6	3	6
(Romania) A Ungur	4	6	4
(Croatia) M Delić	6^{2}	6	3
Q	(Moldova) R Albot	7^{7}	3	6
(Germany) M Berrer	6	1	7^{7}
Q	(Switzerland) S Ehrat	1	6	6^{4}
(Uzbekistan) F Dustov	2	2
7	(Bosnia and Herzegovina) D Džumhur	6	6

Second round
1	(Czech Republic) J Veselý	6	6
(Chinese Taipei) J Wang	4	2
WC	(Serbia) V Troicki	2	3
6	(Cyprus) M Baghdatis	6	6
3	(Slovakia) L Lacko	1^{r}
Q	(Moldova) R Albot	5
(Germany) M Berrer	6	4	5^{r}
7	(Bosnia and Herzegovina) D Džumhur	3	6	5

Quarterfinals
1	(Czech Republic) J Veselý	4	5
6	(Cyprus) M Baghdatis	6	7
Q	(Moldova) R Albot	6	6
7	(Bosnia and Herzegovina) D Džumhur	3	1

Semifinals
6	(Cyprus) M Baghdatis	6	6
Q	(Moldova) R Albot	3	3

=== Bottom half ===
First round
5	(Serbia) F Krajinović	6	6^{6}	6
(Switzerland) M Chiudinelli	4	7^{8}	3
(Romania) V Hănescu	6	4	6
(Hungary) M Fucsovics	3	6	4
WC	(Switzerland) Y Marti	6^{6}	4
(Poland) M Przysiężny	7^{8}	6
(Japan) Y Nishioka	6^{5}	2
4	(Japan) T Ito	7^{7}	6
8	(Germany) P Gojowczyk	2	0^{r}
PR	(Belgium) S Darcis	6	3
Q	(Germany) Moritz Baumann	6	2	4
(Romania) M Copil	3	6	6
(Ukraine) I Marchenko	7^{7}	6
Q	(Croatia) F Škugor	6^{2}	3
WC	(Switzerland) H Laaksonen	4	6	3
2	(Italy) S Bolelli	6	3	6

Second round
5	(Serbia) F Krajinović	6	6^{3}	6^{2}
(Romania) V Hănescu	4	7^{7}	7^{7}
(Poland) M Przysiężny	6	6
4	(Japan) T Ito	1	4
PR	(Belgium) S Darcis	0	6	6
(Romania) M Copil	6	4	4
(Ukraine) I Marchenko	5	6	4
2	(Italy) S Bolelli	7	4	6

Quarterfinals
(Romania) V Hănescu	6^{6}	7^{7}	2
(Poland) M Przysiężny	7^{8}	6^{3}	6
PR	(Belgium) S Darcis	3	6	1
2	(Italy) S Bolelli	6	2	6

Semifinals
(Poland) M Przysiężny	7^{7}	6
2	(Italy) S Bolelli	6^{2}	4
