= 2013 Geneva Open Challenger – Doubles =

Doubles
- 2013 Geneva Open Challenger

Final
- Champions: (Austria) Oliver Marach (Romania) Florin Mergea
- Runners-up: (Slovakia) František Čermák (Austria) Philipp Oswald
- Score: 6–4, 6–3

Events
Singles	Doubles
← 2012 ·	Geneva Open Challenger	· 2014 →

Johan Brunström and Raven Klaasen were the defending champions but decided not to participate.

Oliver Marach and Florin Mergea won the title, defeating František Čermák and Philipp Oswald 6–4, 6–3 in the final.

== Seeds ==
1. (Austria) Oliver Marach / (Romania) Florin Mergea (champions)
2. (Slovakia) František Čermák / (Austria) Philipp Oswald (final)
3. (Russia) Mikhail Elgin / (Slovakia) Michal Mertiňák (quarterfinals)
4. (United Kingdom) Ken Skupski / (United Kingdom) Neal Skupski (quarterfinals)

== Draw ==
=== Key ===
- Q = Qualifier
- WC = Wild card
- LL = Lucky loser
- Alt = Alternate
- SE = Special exempt
- PR = Protected ranking
- ITF = ITF entry
- JE = Junior exempt
- w/o = Walkover
- r = Retired
- d = Defaulted
- SR = Special ranking

=== Draw ===
First round
1	(Austria) O Marach (Romania) F Mergea	7^{7}	6
(Romania) M Copil (Romania) A Ungur	6^{3}	3
(Germany) M Bachinger (Germany) J-L Struff	7	7^{7}
(France) F Martin (France) H Nys	5	6^{4}
3	(Russia) M Elgin (Slovakia) M Mertiňák	6	7^{7}
WC	(Serbia) D Djokovic (Switzerland) M Lammer	2	6^{2}
WC	(Switzerland) S Ehrat (Switzerland) H Laaksonen	4	2
(Croatia) F Škugor (Germany) S Stadler	6	6
(Slovakia) N Gombos (Slovakia) A Martin	4	4
(Netherlands) J Huta Galung (Russia) K Kravchuk	6	6
(United Kingdom) J Delgado (Australia) J Kerr	7^{7}	4	[6]
4	(United Kingdom) K Skupski (United Kingdom) N Skupski	6^{5}	6	[10]
(Switzerland) M Chiudinelli (Austria) M Fischer	4	7	[10]
(Netherlands) T de Bakker (Netherlands) T Schoorel	6	5	[12]
WC	(Switzerland) A Ritschard (Switzerland) A Sadecky	2	2
2	(Slovakia) F Čermák (Austria) P Oswald	6	6

Quarterfinals
1	(Austria) O Marach (Romania) F Mergea	6	7^{7}
(Germany) M Bachinger (Germany) J-L Struff	2	6^{3}
3	(Russia) M Elgin (Slovakia) M Mertiňák	6^{4}	4
(Croatia) F Škugor (Germany) S Stadler	7^{7}	6
(Netherlands) J Huta Galung (Russia) K Kravchuk	6	5	[10]
4	(United Kingdom) K Skupski (United Kingdom) N Skupski	2	7	[7]
(Netherlands) T de Bakker (Netherlands) T Schoorel
2	(Slovakia) F Čermák (Austria) P Oswald	w/o

Semifinals
1	(Austria) O Marach (Romania) F Mergea	6	6
(Croatia) F Škugor (Germany) S Stadler	4	4
(Netherlands) J Huta Galung (Russia) K Kravchuk	4	6^{7}
2	(Slovakia) F Čermák (Austria) P Oswald	6	7^{9}

Final
1	(Austria) O Marach (Romania) F Mergea	6	6
2	(Slovakia) F Čermák (Austria) P Oswald	4	3
