= 2011 IPP Trophy – Singles =

Singles
- 2011 IPP Trophy

Final
- Champion: (Tunisia) Malek Jaziri
- Runner-up: (Germany) Mischa Zverev
- Score: 4–6, 6–3, 6–3

Events
Singles	Doubles
← 2010 ·	IPP Trophy	· 2012 →

Grigor Dimitrov was the defending champion but decided not to participate.
Malek Jaziri won the title, defeating Mischa Zverev 4–6, 6–3, 6–3 in the final.

== Seeds ==
1. (Belgium) Olivier Rochus (first round)
2. (Belgium) Steve Darcis (semifinals)
3. (Germany) Matthias Bachinger (second round)
4. (Slovakia) Martin Kližan (second round)
5. (Slovakia) Karol Beck (first round)
6. (France) Stéphane Robert (first round)
7. (Argentina) Horacio Zeballos (quarterfinals)
8. (Lithuania) Ričardas Berankis (semifinals)

== Draw ==
=== Key ===
- Q = Qualifier
- WC = Wild card
- LL = Lucky loser
- Alt = Alternate
- SE = Special exempt
- PR = Protected ranking
- ITF = ITF entry
- JE = Junior exempt
- w/o = Walkover
- r = Retired
- d = Defaulted
- SR = Special ranking

=== Finals ===
Semifinals
Q	(Germany) Mischa Zverev	1	7^{7}	7
8	(Lithuania) Ričardas Berankis	6	6^{5}	5
(Tunisia) Malek Jaziri	7	6
2	(Belgium) Steve Darcis	5	4

Final
Q	(Germany) Mischa Zverev	6	3	3
(Tunisia) Malek Jaziri	4	6	6

=== Top half ===
First round
1	(Belgium) O Rochus	2	3
(Switzerland) M Chiudinelli	6	6
WC	(Russia) E Donskoy	3	6	3
(Ukraine) S Bubka	6	3	6
(Kazakhstan) Y Schukin	1	3
WC	(Switzerland) A Sadecky	6	6
Q	(Germany) M Zverev	6	6
6	(France) S Robert	3	4
3	(Germany) M Bachinger	6	6
(Israel) A Weintraub	2	4
(Czech Republic) I Minář	1	6	6^{1}
(Belgium) D Goffin	6	3	7^{7}
Q	(France) Albano Olivetti	7^{7}	6
Alt	(Serbia) D Lajović	6^{2}	4
Q	(France) Clément Reix	3	4
8	(Lithuania) R Berankis	6	6

Second round
(Switzerland) M Chiudinelli	6	6
(Ukraine) S Bubka	3	0
WC	(Switzerland) A Sadecky	3	1
Q	(Germany) M Zverev	6	6
3	(Germany) M Bachinger	5	6	6^{5}
(Belgium) D Goffin	7	1	7^{7}
Q	(France) A Olivetti	6^{3}	3
8	(Lithuania) R Berankis	7^{7}	6

Quarterfinals
(Switzerland) M Chiudinelli	6^{4}	4
Q	(Germany) M Zverev	7^{7}	6
(Belgium) D Goffin	3	4
8	(Lithuania) R Berankis	6	6

Semifinals
Q	(Germany) M Zverev	1	7^{7}	7
8	(Lithuania) R Berankis	6	6^{5}	5

=== Bottom half ===
First round
7	(Argentina) H Zeballos	6	6
(Czech Republic) J Hájek	3	4
WC	(Switzerland) M Lammer	6	6
Q	(Germany) Holger Fischer	3	3
(Tunisia) M Jaziri	6	6
(Germany) D Gremelmayr	3	4
(Italy) S Galvani	3	2
4	(Slovakia) M Kližan	6	6
5	(Slovakia) K Beck	3	6	4
WC	(Switzerland) S Bohli	6	3	6
(Monaco) J-R Lisnard	6	3	0^{r}
(Germany) B Phau	3	6	1
(Croatia) K Mesaroš	4	4
(Spain) A Brugués Davi	6	6
(Russia) I Andreev	4	6^{5}
2	(Belgium) S Darcis	6	7^{7}

Second round
7	(Argentina) H Zeballos	6	3	7^{7}
WC	(Switzerland) M Lammer	3	6	6^{5}
(Tunisia) M Jaziri	3	7^{7}	6
4	(Slovakia) M Kližan	6	6^{5}	1
WC	(Switzerland) S Bohli	7^{7}	7^{7}
(Germany) B Phau	6^{2}	6^{1}
(Spain) A Brugués Davi	3	3
2	(Belgium) S Darcis	6	6

Quarterfinals
7	(Argentina) H Zeballos	6^{6}	5
(Tunisia) M Jaziri	7^{8}	7
WC	(Switzerland) S Bohli	6^{5}	6	2
2	(Belgium) S Darcis	7^{7}	3	6

Semifinals
(Tunisia) M Jaziri	7	6
2	(Belgium) S Darcis	5	4
