= 2009 IPP Trophy – Singles =

Singles
- 2009 IPP Trophy

Final
- Champion: (Germany) Dominik Meffert
- Runner-up: (Monaco) Benjamin Balleret
- Score: 6–3, 6–1

Events
Singles	Doubles
← 2008 ·	IPP Trophy	· 2010 →

Kristof Vliegen chose to not defend his 2008 title.
Dominik Meffert won in the final 6–3, 6–1, against Benjamin Balleret.

== Seeds ==
1. (Switzerland) Stéphane Bohli (second round)
2. (Czech Republic) Jan Hájek (quarterfinals)
3. (Czech Republic) Jiří Vaněk (first round)
4. (Kazakhstan) Yuri Schukin (semifinals)
5. (Switzerland) Michael Lammer (first round)
6. (Germany) Dominik Meffert (champion)
7. (Belgium) Niels Desein (first round)
8. (Argentina) Diego Álvarez (quarterfinals)

== Draw ==
=== Key ===
- Q = Qualifier
- WC = Wild card
- LL = Lucky loser
- Alt = Alternate
- SE = Special exempt
- PR = Protected ranking
- ITF = ITF entry
- JE = Junior exempt
- w/o = Walkover
- r = Retired
- d = Defaulted
- SR = Special ranking

=== Final four ===
Semifinals
(Monaco) Benjamin Balleret	7	6
(Austria) Philipp Oswald	5	2
4	(Kazakhstan) Yuri Schukin	1	3
6	(Germany) Dominik Meffert	6	6

Final
(Monaco) Benjamin Balleret	3	1
6	(Germany) Dominik Meffert	6	6

=== Top half ===
First round
1	(Switzerland) S Bohli	7	6
WC	(Switzerland) A Sadecky	6^{2}	3
(Czech Republic) J Pospíšil	3	6	4
(Czech Republic) R Vik	6	4	6
(Belgium) Y Mertens	6	6^{3}	6^{5}
Q	(France) G Burquier	3	7	7
(Monaco) B Balleret	6	7
7	(Belgium) N Desein	2	6^{5}
3	(Czech Republic) J Vaněk	3	1
(Austria) P Oswald	6	6
(France) J Haehnel	5	0
(Germany) M Bachinger	7	6
(Slovakia) P Červenák	6	7
Q	(Moldova) A Gorban	4	6^{3}
WC	(Russia) E Donskoy	6	6
5	(Switzerland) M Lammer	3	3

Second round
1	(Switzerland) S Bohli	6^{6}	2
(Czech Republic) R Vik	7	6
Q	(France) G Burquier	1	6	3
(Monaco) B Balleret	6	4	6
(Austria) P Oswald	7	6^{3}	6
(Germany) M Bachinger	6^{1}	7	3
(Slovakia) P Červenák	2	6	4
WC	(Russia) E Donskoy	6	3	6

Quarterfinals
(Czech Republic) R Vik	7	1	6^{5}
(Monaco) B Balleret	5	6	7
(Austria) P Oswald	7	4	7
WC	(Russia) E Donskoy	6^{3}	6	6^{10}

Semifinals
(Monaco) B Balleret	7	6
(Austria) P Oswald	5	2

=== Bottom half ===
First round
8	(Argentina) D Álvarez	6	2
(Netherlands) J Huta Galung	2	1	r
(Slovakia) M Kližan	5	7	6
(Germany) S Stadler	7	5	3
(Italy) M Marrai	6	6
(Australia) J Sirianni	1	3
WC	(Switzerland) S Ehrat	2	2
4	(Kazakhstan) Y Schukin	6	6
6	(Germany) D Meffert	7	6
(Argentina) J-M Aranguren	5	4
Q	(Sweden) T Göransson	4	6	0
Q	(Russia) D Sitak	6	4	6
WC	(France) A Dupuis	6^{3}	2
(France) T Ascione	7	6
(Austria) A Peya	4	3
2	(Czech Republic) J Hájek	6	6

Second round
8	(Argentina) D Álvarez	7	7
(Slovakia) M Kližan	6^{6}	6^{4}
(Italy) M Marrai	4	0
4	(Kazakhstan) Y Schukin	6	6
6	(Germany) D Meffert	6	6
Q	(Russia) D Sitak	3	4
(France) T Ascione	6^{4}	5
2	(Czech Republic) J Hájek	7	7

Quarterfinals
8	(Argentina) D Álvarez	3	3
4	(Kazakhstan) Y Schukin	6	6
6	(Germany) D Meffert	6	6^{6}	7
2	(Czech Republic) J Hájek	3	7	5

Semifinals
4	(Kazakhstan) Y Schukin	1	3
6	(Germany) D Meffert	6	6
