= 2014 Geneva Open Challenger – Doubles =

Doubles
- 2014 Geneva Open Challenger

Final
- Champions: (Sweden) Johan Brunström (United States) Nicholas Monroe
- Runners-up: (Austria) Oliver Marach (Austria) Philipp Oswald
- Score: 5-7, 7-5, [10-6]

Events
| Singles | Doubles |
| ← 2013 · | Geneva Open Challenger | · 2015 → |

Oliver Marach and Florin Mergea were the defending champions. Mergea did not participate this year, Marach partnered fellow Austrian Philipp Oswald.

Johan Brunström and Nicholas Monroe won the title, defeating Marach and Oswald in the final.

== Seeds ==
1. (Austria) Oliver Marach / (Austria) Philipp Oswald (final)
2. (Sweden) Johan Brunström / (United States) Nicholas Monroe (champions)
3. (Czech Republic) František Čermák / (Israel) Jonathan Erlich (quarterfinals)
4. (United Kingdom) Colin Fleming / (United Kingdom) Jonathan Marray (semifinals)

== Draw ==
=== Key ===
- Q = Qualifier
- WC = Wild card
- LL = Lucky loser
- Alt = Alternate
- SE = Special exempt
- PR = Protected ranking
- ITF = ITF entry
- JE = Junior exempt
- w/o = Walkover
- r = Retired
- d = Defaulted
- SR = Special ranking

First round
1 | (Austria) O Marach (Austria) P Oswald | 4 | 7 | [10]
(United States) J Cerretani (Sweden) A Siljeström | 6 | 5 | [5]
(Germany) F Moser (Germany) A Satschko | 4 | 6 | [7]
(Moldova) R Albot (Romania) V Hănescu | 6 | 3 | [10]
3 | (Czech Republic) F Čermák (Israel) J Erlich | 2 | 6 | [10]
(Czech Republic) R Jebavý (Czech Republic) J Veselý | 6 | 3 | [5]
(United Kingdom) K Skupski (United Kingdom) N Skupski | 6^{2} | 7 | [10]
WC | (Switzerland) M Chiudinelli (Switzerland) M Lammer | 7^{7} | 5 | [8]
(Bosnia and Herzegovina) D Džumhur (Croatia) F Škugor | 7^{7} | 4 | [10]
PR | (France) O Charroin (Italy) A Motti | 6^{3} | 6 | [6]
(Croatia) M Delić (Serbia) F Krajinović | 2 | 4
4 | (United Kingdom) C Fleming (United Kingdom) J Marray | 6 | 6
(Slovakia) L Lacko (Croatia) A Pavić | 6 | 6
WC | (Switzerland) A Bellier (Switzerland) Joss Espasandin | 1 | 3
WC | (Switzerland) S Ehrat (Switzerland) H Laaksonen | 3 | 6 | [6]
2 | (Sweden) J Brunström (United States) N Monroe | 6 | 4 | [10]

Quarterfinals
1 | (Austria) O Marach (Austria) P Oswald | 6 | 7
(Moldova) R Albot (Romania) V Hănescu | 3 | 5
3 | (Czech Republic) F Čermák (Israel) J Erlich | 6 | 3 | [6]
(United Kingdom) K Skupski (United Kingdom) N Skupski | 3 | 6 | [10]
(Bosnia and Herzegovina) D Džumhur (Croatia) F Škugor | 4 | 5
4 | (United Kingdom) C Fleming (United Kingdom) J Marray | 6 | 7
(Slovakia) L Lacko (Croatia) A Pavić
2 | (Sweden) J Brunström (United States) N Monroe | w/o

Semifinals
1 | (Austria) O Marach (Austria) P Oswald | 6 | 6
(United Kingdom) K Skupski (United Kingdom) N Skupski | 3 | 4
4 | (United Kingdom) C Fleming (United Kingdom) J Marray | 3 | 6^{2}
2 | (Sweden) J Brunström (United States) N Monroe | 6 | 7^{7}

Final
1 | (Austria) O Marach (Austria) P Oswald | 7 | 5 | [6]
2 | (Sweden) J Brunström (United States) N Monroe | 5 | 7 | [10]
