= 2012 Geneva Open Challenger – Singles =

Singles
- 2012 Geneva Open Challenger

Final
- Champion: (France) Marc Gicquel
- Runner-up: (Germany) Matthias Bachinger
- Score: 3–6, 6–3, 6–4

Events
Singles	Doubles
- Geneva Open Challenger

Malek Jaziri was the defending champion but was defeated in the second round by Henri Laaksonen.
Marc Gicquel won the title, defeating Matthias Bachinger 3–6, 6–3, 6–4 in the final.

== Seeds ==
1. (Germany) Tobias Kamke (first round)
2. (Czech Republic) Lukáš Rosol (first round)
3. (Slovenia) Aljaž Bedene (first round)
4. (Germany) Björn Phau (second round)
5. (Tunisia) Malek Jaziri (second round)
6. (Israel) Dudi Sela (first round)
7. (Belgium) Olivier Rochus (quarterfinals)
8. (Canada) Vasek Pospisil (first round)

== Draw ==
Key

- Q = Qualifier
- WC = Wild card
- LL = Lucky loser
- Alt = Alternate
- ITF = ITF entry
- PR = Protected ranking
- SR = Special ranking
- SE = Special exempt
- JE = Junior exempt
- JR = Junior Accelerator Programme entrant
- CO = College Accelerator Programme entrant
- NG = Next Gen Accelerator Program entrant
- w/o = Walkover
- r = Retired
- d = Defaulted

=== Finals ===
Semifinals
(Germany) Matthias Bachinger	7	6
WC	(Switzerland) Henri Laaksonen	5	1
Alt	(France) Marc Gicquel	7^{7}	2	6
(Romania) Marius Copil	6^{4}	6	4

Final
(Germany) Matthias Bachinger	6	3	4
Alt	(France) Marc Gicquel	3	6	6

=== Top half ===
First round
1	(Germany) T Kamke	2	6^{1}
(Germany) M Bachinger	6	7^{7}
Alt	(Serbia) D Lajović	2	6	3
(Argentina) F Delbonis	6	4	6
(Kazakhstan) A Golubev	4	2
(Ukraine) I Sergeyev	6	6
WC	(Switzerland) S Ehrat	7	6^{7}	4
7	(Belgium) O Rochus	5	7^{9}	6
4	(Germany) B Phau	6	7^{10}
(Ukraine) S Bubka	2	6^{8}
(Czech Republic) J Hájek	7	5	0^{r}
(Ukraine) I Marchenko	5	6	2
(South Africa) R de Voest	7^{10}	6^{5}	6^{6}
WC	(Switzerland) H Laaksonen	6^{8}	7^{7}	7^{8}
Q	(Ukraine) S Stakhovskiy	4	6	4
5	(Tunisia) M Jaziri	6	4	6

Second round
(Germany) M Bachinger	4	6	6
(Argentina) F Delbonis	6	3	4
(Ukraine) I Sergeyev	1	3
7	(Belgium) O Rochus	6	6
4	(Germany) B Phau	6	2	2
(Ukraine) I Marchenko	1	6	6
WC	(Switzerland) H Laaksonen	7	7^{10}
5	(Tunisia) M Jaziri	5	6^{8}

Quarterfinals
(Germany) M Bachinger	7^{7}	4	7^{7}
7	(Belgium) O Rochus	6^{5}	6	6^{3}
(Ukraine) I Marchenko	3	7^{7}	5
WC	(Switzerland) H Laaksonen	6	6^{4}	7

Semifinals
(Germany) M Bachinger	7	6
WC	(Switzerland) H Laaksonen	5	1

=== Bottom half ===
First round
8	(Canada) V Pospisil	7^{7}	2	2
Q	(France) G Burquier	6^{4}	6	6
Q	(France) J Eysseric	7	6
(Switzerland) M Chiudinelli	5	1
(Russia) E Donskoy	7^{7}	7^{7}
Q	(Switzerland) Adrien Bossel	6^{1}	6^{3}
Alt	(France) M Gicquel	6	7^{7}
3	(Slovenia) A Bedene	3	6^{2}
6	(Israel) D Sela	3	1
(France) K de Schepper	6	6
WC	(Switzerland) S Bohli	6	6
(Brazil) T Alves	3	4
WC	(Russia) Alexander Rumyantsev	2	2
(Russia) I Kunitsyn	6	6
(Romania) M Copil	4	7^{7}	7^{7}
2	(Czech Republic) L Rosol	6	6^{3}	6^{1}

Second round
Q	(France) G Burquier	3	6	5
Q	(France) J Eysseric	6	3	7
(Russia) E Donskoy	7	6^{3}	4
Alt	(France) M Gicquel	5	7^{7}	6
(France) K de Schepper	4	6	6^{4}
WC	(Switzerland) S Bohli	6	3	7^{7}
(Russia) I Kunitsyn	4	5
(Romania) M Copil	6	7

Quarterfinals
Q	(France) J Eysseric	2	4
Alt	(France) M Gicquel	6	6
WC	(Switzerland) S Bohli	7	4	4
(Romania) M Copil	5	6	6

Semifinals
Alt	(France) M Gicquel	7^{7}	2	6
(Romania) M Copil	6^{4}	6	4
