= 2014 Geneva Open Challenger =

- Date: 27 October – 2 November
- Edition: 27th
- Surface: Hard / Indoor
- Location: Geneva, Switzerland

2013 Champions

Singles
- (Tunisia) Malek Jaziri

Doubles
- (Austria) Oliver Marach / (Romania) Florin Mergea
← 2013 ·	Geneva Open Challenger	· 2015 →

The 2014 Geneva Open Challenger was a professional tennis tournament played on indoor hard courts. It was the 27th edition of the tournament which was part of the 2014 ATP Challenger Tour. It took place in Geneva, Switzerland between 27 October and 2 November 2014.

== Singles main-draw entrants ==
=== Seeds ===
Country	Player	Rank^{1}	Seed
CZE	Jiří Veselý	67	1
ITA	Simone Bolelli	78	2
SVK	Lukáš Lacko	93	3
JPN	Tatsuma Ito	98	4
SRB	Filip Krajinović	110	5
CYP	Marcos Baghdatis	112	6
BIH	Damir Džumhur	114	7
GER	Peter Gojowczyk	117	8
SVK	Andrej Martin	124	9

- ^{1} Rankings are as of 20 October 2014.

=== Other entrants ===
The following players received wildcards into the singles main draw:

- (Switzerland) Henri Laaksonen
- (Switzerland) Michael Lammer
- (Switzerland) Yann Marti
- (Serbia) Viktor Troicki

The following players received entry from the qualifying draw:

- (Moldova) Radu Albot
- (Germany) Moritz Baumann
- (Switzerland) Sandro Ehrat
- (Croatia) Franko Škugor

== Champions ==
=== Singles ===
- (Cyprus) Marcos Baghdatis def. (Poland) Michał Przysiężny 6–1, 4–6, 6–3

=== Doubles ===
- (Sweden) Johan Brunström / (United States) Nicholas Monroe def. (Austria) Oliver Marach / (Austria) Philipp Oswald 5–7, 7–5, [10–6]
