= 2011 IPP Trophy – Doubles =

Doubles
- 2011 IPP Trophy

Final
- Champions: (Russia) Igor Andreev (Russia) Evgeny Donskoy
- Runners-up: (United States) James Cerretani (Canada) Adil Shamasdin
- Score: 7–6^{(7–1)}, 7–6^{(7–2)}

Events
Singles	Doubles
← 2010 ·	IPP Trophy	· 2012 →

Gero Kretschmer and Alex Satschko were the defending champions but decided not to participate.
Igor Andreev and Evgeny Donskoy won the title, defeating James Cerretani and Adil Shamasdin 7–6^{(7–1)}, 7–6^{(7–2)} in the final.

== Seeds ==
1. (United States) James Cerretani / (Canada) Adil Shamasdin (final)
2. (Germany) Philipp Marx / (Slovakia) Igor Zelenay (first round)
3. (United Kingdom) Ken Skupski / (Argentina) Horacio Zeballos (semifinals)
4. (Australia) Jordan Kerr / (United States) Travis Parrott (quarterfinals)

== Draw ==
=== Key ===
- Q = Qualifier
- WC = Wild card
- LL = Lucky loser
- Alt = Alternate
- SE = Special exempt
- PR = Protected ranking
- ITF = ITF entry
- JE = Junior exempt
- w/o = Walkover
- r = Retired
- d = Defaulted
- SR = Special ranking

=== Draw ===
First round
1	(United States) J Cerretani (Canada) A Shamasdin	6	6
(Spain) A Brugués-Davi (Israel) A Weintraub	2	1
(Switzerland) M Lammer (Switzerland) A Sadecky	6	6
(Italy) S Galvani (Kazakhstan) Y Schukin	3	1
3	(United Kingdom) K Skupski (Argentina) H Zeballos	6	6
(Croatia) K Mesaroš (Croatia) Ante Pavić	3	4
(France) O Charroin (France) S Robert	5	3
(Slovakia) K Beck (Slovakia) M Mertiňák	7	6
WC	(Switzerland) G Bastl (France) Florian Valsot	4	0
(Czech Republic) J Hájek (Czech Republic) D Škoch	6	6
WC	(Switzerland) Stefan Fiacan (Switzerland) Jessy Kalambay	0	2
4	(Australia) J Kerr (United States) T Parrott	6	6
WC	(Switzerland) Adrien Bossel (Switzerland) Sandro Ehrat	6^{2}	3
(Russia) I Andreev (Russia) E Donskoy	7^{7}	6
(Germany) D Gremelmayr (Germany) B Phau	6	6
2	(Germany) P Marx (Slovakia) I Zelenay	3	3

Quarterfinals
1	(United States) J Cerretani (Canada) A Shamasdin	6	6
(Switzerland) M Lammer (Switzerland) A Sadecky	3	4
3	(United Kingdom) K Skupski (Argentina) H Zeballos	6	7^{7}
(Slovakia) K Beck (Slovakia) M Mertiňák	4	6^{3}
(Czech Republic) J Hájek (Czech Republic) D Škoch	7^{7}	6
4	(Australia) J Kerr (United States) T Parrott	6^{4}	4
(Russia) I Andreev (Russia) E Donskoy	6	6
(Germany) D Gremelmayr (Germany) B Phau	1	2

Semifinals
1	(United States) J Cerretani (Canada) A Shamasdin	6	6
3	(United Kingdom) K Skupski (Argentina) H Zeballos	4	4
(Czech Republic) J Hájek (Czech Republic) D Škoch	3	6	[4]
(Russia) I Andreev (Russia) E Donskoy	6	4	[10]

Final
1	(United States) J Cerretani (Canada) A Shamasdin	6^{1}	6^{2}
(Russia) I Andreev (Russia) E Donskoy	7^{7}	7^{7}
