= 2010 IPP Trophy – Doubles =

Doubles
- 2010 IPP Trophy

Final
- Champions: (Germany) Gero Kretschmer (Germany) Alex Satschko
- Runners-up: (Austria) Philipp Oswald (Austria) Martin Slanar
- Score: 6–3, 4–6, [11–9]

Events
Singles	Doubles
← 2009 ·	IPP Trophy	· 2011 →

Diego Álvarez and Juan-Martín Aranguren were the defending champions but decided not to participate.
Gero Kretschmer and Alex Satschko won in the final 6–3, 4–6, [11–9], against Philipp Oswald and Martin Slanar.

== Seeds ==
1. (Austria) Philipp Oswald / (Austria) Martin Slanar (final)
2. (Spain) Pablo Andújar / (Spain) Santiago Ventura (first round)
3. (United Kingdom) Jamie Murray / (Kazakhstan) Yuri Schukin (first round)
4. (United States) Ashwin Kumar / (Sweden) Andreas Siljeström (semifinals)

== Draw ==
=== Key ===
- Q = Qualifier
- WC = Wild card
- LL = Lucky loser
- Alt = Alternate
- SE = Special exempt
- PR = Protected ranking
- ITF = ITF entry
- JE = Junior exempt
- w/o = Walkover
- r = Retired
- d = Defaulted
- SR = Special ranking

=== Draw ===
First round
1	(Austria) P Oswald (Austria) M Slanar	6	6
(Spain) S Gutiérrez-Ferrol (Croatia) I Zovko	1	2
(Spain) G Granollers-Pujol (Spain) A Ramos-Viñolas	6	6
(Italy) T Fabbiano (Italy) P Lorenzi	3	1
4	(United States) A Kumar (Sweden) A Siljeström	6^{3}	6	[10]
(Italy) A Arnaboldi (Spain) G Olaso	7	4	[8]
(France) A Gensse (France) É Prodon	7	7
(Slovakia) P Červenák (Finland) T Nieminen	6^{3}	6^{5}
(Spain) MÁ López Jaén (Spain) I Navarro	5	6	[10]
WC	(Russia) I Belyaev (Serbia) M Djokovic	7	4	[4]
(Serbia) N Ćirić (Montenegro) G Tošić	6	3	[17]
3	(United Kingdom) J Murray (Kazakhstan) Y Schukin	3	6	[15]
(Switzerland) A Bossel (Switzerland) A Sadecky	6	0	[10]
(France) O Charroin (France) A Renard	3	6	[4]
(Germany) G Kretschmer (Germany) A Satschko	6	6
2	(Spain) P Andújar (Spain) S Ventura	4	1

Quarterfinals
1	(Austria) P Oswald (Austria) M Slanar	6	6
(Spain) G Granollers-Pujol (Spain) A Ramos-Viñolas	4	1
3	(United States) A Kumar (Sweden) A Siljeström	6	7
(France) A Gensse (France) É Prodon	4	6^{1}
(Spain) MÁ López Jaén (Spain) I Navarro	4	6	[14]
(Serbia) N Ćirić (Montenegro) G Tošić	6	3	[12]
(Switzerland) A Bossel (Switzerland) A Sadecky	w/o
(Germany) G Kretschmer (Germany) A Satschko

Semifinals
1	(Austria) P Oswald (Austria) M Slanar	6	3	[10]
3	(United States) A Kumar (Sweden) A Siljeström	3	6	[4]
(Spain) MÁ López Jaén (Spain) I Navarro	4	4
(Germany) G Kretschmer (Germany) A Satschko	6	6

Finals
1	(Austria) P Oswald (Austria) M Slanar	3	6	[9]
(Germany) G Kretschmer (Germany) A Satschko	6	4	[11]
