= 2010 IPP Trophy – Singles =

Singles
- 2010 IPP Trophy

Final
- Champion: (Bulgaria) Grigor Dimitrov
- Runner-up: (Spain) Pablo Andújar
- Score: 6–2, 4–6, 6–4

Events
Singles	Doubles
← 2009 ·	IPP Trophy	· 2011 →

Dominik Meffert was the defending champion but decided not to participate this year.
Grigor Dimitrov won the final against Pablo Andújar 6–2, 4–6, 6–4.

== Seeds ==
1. (Italy) Paolo Lorenzi (quarterfinals)
2. (Germany) Julian Reister (first round)
3. (Spain) Pablo Andújar (final)
4. (Kazakhstan) Yuri Schukin (first round, retired due to fatigue)
5. (Spain) Santiago Ventura (first round)
6. (Spain) Albert Ramos Viñolas (quarterfinals)
7. (Spain) Iván Navarro (first round)
8. (France) Éric Prodon (semifinals)

== Draw ==
=== Key ===
- Q = Qualifier
- WC = Wild card
- LL = Lucky loser
- Alt = Alternate
- SE = Special exempt
- PR = Protected ranking
- ITF = ITF entry
- JE = Junior exempt
- w/o = Walkover
- r = Retired
- d = Defaulted
- SR = Special ranking

=== Finals ===
Semifinals
8	(France) Éric Prodon	6^{3}	6^{6}
3	(Spain) Pablo Andújar	7	7
(Bulgaria) Grigor Dimitrov	6	7
(Belgium) David Goffin	3	5

Final
3	(Spain) Pablo Andújar	2	6	4
(Bulgaria) Grigor Dimitrov	6	4	6

=== Top half ===
First round
1	(Italy) P Lorenzi	6	7
(Serbia) N Ćirić	4	6^{2}
WC	(Switzerland) A Sadecky	7	6^{5}	6
WC	(Russia) I Belyaev	6^{8}	7	1
(Spain) S Gutiérrez-Ferrol	3	3
WC	(Switzerland) A Bossel	6	6
(Australia) J Lemke	3	2
8	(France) É Prodon	6	6
3	(Spain) P Andújar	6	4	6
(Spain) G Olaso	4	6	3
(Italy) A Arnaboldi	6	6
Q	(France) M Rodrigues	0	3
Q	(France) A Renard	1	1
Q	(Sweden) F Prpic	6	6
(Finland) T Nieminen	4	7	2
6	(Spain) A Ramos Viñolas	6	6^{4}	6

Second round
1	(Italy) P Lorenzi	7	4	6
WC	(Switzerland) A Sadecky	6^{1}	6	3
WC	(Switzerland) A Bossel	6^{5}	3
8	(France) É Prodon	7	6
3	(Spain) P Andújar	7	6
(Italy) A Arnaboldi	5	1
Q	(Sweden) F Prpic	4	6^{3}
6	(Spain) A Ramos Viñolas	6	7

Quarterfinals
1	(Italy) P Lorenzi	4	7	3
8	(France) É Prodon	6	6^{0}	6
3	(Spain) P Andújar	6	3	7
6	(Spain) A Ramos Viñolas	2	6	6^{8}

Semifinals
8	(France) É Prodon	6^{3}	6^{6}
3	(Spain) P Andújar	7	7

=== Bottom half ===
First round
7	(Spain) I Navarro	6	6^{3}	4
(France) A Gensse	3	7	6
PR	(Germany) A Satschko	3	4
(France) L Rochette	6	6
(Bulgaria) G Dimitrov	6	6
(Germany) C-M Stebe	3	3
(Slovakia) P Červenák	6	4
4	(Kazakhstan) Y Schukin	3	1	r
5	(Spain) S Ventura	1	5
(France) J Eysseric	6	7
Q	(France) C Reix	6	3	5
WC	(Serbia) M Djokovic	3	6	7
(Montenegro) G Tošić	6	7
(Austria) P Oswald	2	6^{5}
(Belgium) D Goffin	7	6
2	(Germany) J Reister	6^{5}	2

Second round
(France) A Gensse	6	3	5
(France) L Rochette	3	6	7
(Bulgaria) G Dimitrov	6	7
(Slovakia) P Červenák	3	5
(France) J Eysseric	6	6
WC	(Serbia) M Djokovic	1	2
(Montenegro) G Tošić	4	6^{4}
(Belgium) D Goffin	6	7

Quarterfinals
(France) L Rochette	1	4
(Bulgaria) G Dimitrov	6	6
(France) J Eysseric	6	2	2
(Belgium) D Goffin	3	6	6

Semifinals
(Bulgaria) G Dimitrov	6	7
(Belgium) D Goffin	3	5
