= 2011 IPP Trophy =

- Date: 7 – 13 November
- Edition: 24th
- Location: Geneva, Switzerland

Champions

Singles
- (Tunisia) Malek Jaziri

Doubles
- (Russia) Igor Andreev / (Russia) Evgeny Donskoy
← 2010 ·	IPP Trophy	· 2012 →

The 2011 IPP Trophy was a professional tennis tournament played on clay courts. It was the 24th edition of the tournament which is part of the 2011 ATP Challenger Tour. It took place in Geneva, Switzerland between 7 and 13 November 2011.

== ATP entrants ==
=== Seeds ===
Country	Player	Rank^{1}	Seed
BEL	Olivier Rochus	69	1
BEL	Steve Darcis	89	2
GER	Matthias Bachinger	90	3
SVK	Martin Kližan	92	4
SVK	Karol Beck	100	5
FRA	Stéphane Robert	102	6
ARG	Horacio Zeballos	108	7
LTU	Ričardas Berankis	112	8

- ^{1} Rankings are as of October 31, 2011.

=== Other entrants ===
The following players received wildcards into the singles main draw:

- (Switzerland) Stéphane Bohli
- (Russia) Evgeny Donskoy
- (Switzerland) Michael Lammer
- (Switzerland) Alexander Sadecky

The following players received entry from the qualifying draw:

- (Germany) Holger Fischer
- (France) Albano Olivetti
- (France) Clément Reix
- (Germany) Mischa Zverev

== Champions ==
=== Singles ===
(Tunisia) Malek Jaziri def. (Germany) Mischa Zverev, 4–6, 6–3, 6–3

=== Doubles ===
(Russia) Igor Andreev / (Russia) Evgeny Donskoy def. (United States) James Cerretani / (Canada) Adil Shamasdin, 7–6^{(7–1)}, 7–6^{(7–2)}
