= 2013 Geneva Open Challenger =

- Date: 28 October – 3 November
- Edition: 26th
- Surface: Hard
- Location: Geneva, Switzerland

Champions

Singles
- (Tunisia) Malek Jaziri

Doubles
- (Austria) Oliver Marach / (Romania) Florin Mergea
← 2012 ·	Geneva Open Challenger	· 2014 →

The 2013 Geneva Open Challenger was a professional tennis tournament played on hard courts. It was the 26th edition of the tournament which was part of the 2013 ATP Challenger Tour. It took place in Geneva, Switzerland between 28 October and 3 November 2013.

== Singles main-draw entrants ==
=== Seeds ===
Country	Player	Rank^{1}	Seed
~~KAZ~~	~~Mikhail Kukushkin~~	~~67~~	~~1~~
RUS	Evgeny Donskoy	78	2
RUS	Teymuraz Gabashvili	93	3
NED	Jesse Huta Galung	98	4
ROU	Adrian Ungur	110	5
SVK	Martin Kližan	112	6
GER	Jan-Lennard Struff	114	7
KAZ	Andrey Golubev	117	8
SVK	Andrej Martin	124	9

- ^{1} Rankings are as of 21 October 2013.

=== Other entrants ===
The following players received wildcards into the singles main draw:

- (Switzerland) Stéphane Bohli
- (Switzerland) Sandro Ehrat
- (Russia) Karen Khachanov
- (Switzerland) Alexander Ritschard

The following players received entry from the qualifying draw:

- (France) Grégoire Burquier
- (Italy) Matteo Donati
- (Switzerland) Michael Lammer
- (Switzerland) Yann Marti

The following players received entry as a Lucky Loser:

- (France) Laurent Recouderc

== Champions ==
=== Singles ===
- (Tunisia) Malek Jaziri def. (Germany) Jan-Lennard Struff 6–4, 6–3

=== Doubles ===
- (Austria) Oliver Marach / (Romania) Florin Mergea def. (Slovakia) František Čermák / (Austria) Philipp Oswald 6–4, 6–3
