= 2009 IPP Trophy =

- Date: August 17 – August 23
- Edition: 22nd
- Location: Geneva, Switzerland

Champions

Singles
- (Germany) Dominik Meffert

Doubles
- (Argentina) Diego Álvarez / (Argentina) Juan-Martín Aranguren
← 2008 ·	IPP Trophy	· 2010 →

The 2009 IPP Trophy was a professional tennis tournament played on outdoor red clay courts. It was the twenty-second edition of the tournament which was part of the 2009 ATP Challenger Tour. It took place in Geneva, Switzerland between 17 and 23 August 2009.

== Singles entrants ==
=== Seeds ===
Nationality	Player	Ranking*	Seeding
SUI	Stéphane Bohli	144	1
CZE	Jan Hájek	154	2
CZE	Jiří Vaněk	167	3
KAZ	Yuri Schukin	173	4
SUI	Michael Lammer	184	5
GER	Dominik Meffert	198	6
BEL	Niels Desein	208	7
ARG	Diego Álvarez	227	8

- Rankings are as of August 10, 2009.

=== Other entrants ===
The following players received wildcards into the singles main draw:

- (Russia) Evgeny Donskoy
- (France) Antony Dupuis
- (Switzerland) Sandro Ehrat
- (Switzerland) Alexander Sadecky

The following players received entry from the qualifying draw:

- (France) Gregoire Burquier
- (Sweden) Tim Goransson
- (Moldova) Andrei Gorban
- (Russia) Dmitri Sitak

== Champions ==
=== Singles ===
(Germany) Dominik Meffert def. (Monaco) Benjamin Balleret, 6–3, 6–1

=== Doubles ===
(Argentina) Diego Álvarez / (Argentina) Juan-Martín Aranguren def. (Finland) Henri Laaksonen / (Austria) Philipp Oswald, 6–4, 4–6, [10–2]
