= 2009 IPP Trophy – Doubles =

Doubles
- 2009 IPP Trophy

Final
- Champions: (Argentina) Diego Álvarez (Argentina) Juan-Martín Aranguren
- Runners-up: (Finland) Henri Laaksonen (Austria) Philipp Oswald
- Score: 6–4, 4–6, [10–2]

Events
Singles	Doubles
← 2008 ·	IPP Trophy	· 2010 →

Daniel Köllerer and Frank Moser were the defending champions, but they didn't try to defend their title.
Argentinian pair Diego Álvarez and Juan-Martín Aranguren defeated Henri Laaksonen and Philipp Oswald 6–4, 4–6, [10–2] in the final.

== Seeds ==
First-seeded pair received a bye from the first round.

1. (Germany) Michael Kohlmann / (Netherlands) Rogier Wassen (quarterfinals)
2. (United States) James Cerretani / (United States) Travis Rettenmaier (quarterfinals)
3. (Australia) Rameez Junaid / (Germany) Philipp Marx (semifinals)
4. (Australia) Joseph Sirianni / (Russia) Dmitri Sitak (semifinals)

== Draw ==
=== Key ===
- Q = Qualifier
- WC = Wild card
- LL = Lucky loser
- Alt = Alternate
- SE = Special exempt
- PR = Protected ranking
- ITF = ITF entry
- JE = Junior exempt
- w/o = Walkover
- r = Retired
- d = Defaulted
- SR = Special ranking

=== Draw ===
First round
(Finland) H Laaksonen (Austria) P Oswald	6	6
(Canada) A Shamasdin (Sweden) A Siljeström	3	2
3	(Australia) R Junaid (Germany) P Marx	6	7
(France) O Charroin (Czech Republic) J Pospíšil	3	5
(Netherlands) S Groen (Italy) M Marrai	6	2	[8]
WC	(Switzerland) S Bohli (Switzerland) J Espasandin	1	6	[10]
(Poland) T Bednarek (Poland) M Kowalczyk	1	7	[10]
(Czech Republic) J Hájek (Czech Republic) D Karol	6	6^{3}	[5]
(Belgium) N Desein (Belgium) Y Mertens	4	2
4	(Australia) J Sirianni (Russia) D Sitak	6	6
(Argentina) D Álvarez (Argentina) J-M Aranguren	7	7
(Russia) E Donskoy (Russia) V Zinyakov	6^{4}	5
WC	(Germany) M Bachinger (Greece) N Karagiannis	3	4
2	(United States) J Cerretani (United States) T Rettenmaier	6	6

Quarterfinals
1	(Germany) M Kohlmann (Netherlands) R Wassen	6	3	[6]
(Finland) H Laaksonen (Austria) P Oswald	1	6	[10]
3	(Australia) R Junaid (Germany) P Marx	6	6
WC	(Switzerland) S Bohli (Switzerland) J Espasandin	3	4
(Poland) T Bednarek (Poland) M Kowalczyk	3	3
4	(Australia) J Sirianni (Russia) D Sitak	6	6
(Argentina) D Álvarez (Argentina) J-M Aranguren	3	6	[10]
2	(United States) J Cerretani (United States) T Rettenmaier	6	4	[7]

Semifinals
(Finland) H Laaksonen (Austria) P Oswald	7	7
3	(Australia) R Junaid (Germany) P Marx	5	5
4	(Australia) J Sirianni (Russia) D Sitak	2	2
(Argentina) D Álvarez (Argentina) J-M Aranguren	6	6

Finals
(Finland) H Laaksonen (Austria) P Oswald	4	6	[2]
(Argentina) D Álvarez (Argentina) J-M Aranguren	6	4	[10]
