= 2018 Qujing International Challenger =

- Date: 19–25 March
- Edition: 1st
- Surface: Hard
- Location: Qujing, China

Champions

Singles
- (Tunisia) Malek Jaziri

Doubles
- (Belarus) Aliaksandr Bury / (Chinese Taipei) Peng Hsien-yin
| Qujing International Challenger |

The 2018 Qujing International Challenger was a professional tennis tournament played on hard courts. It was the first edition of the tournament which was part of the 2018 ATP Challenger Tour. It took place in Qujing, China between 19 and 25 March 2018.

== Singles main-draw entrants ==
=== Seeds ===
| Country | Player | Rank^{1} | Seed |
|---|---|---|---|
| TUN | Malek Jaziri | 84 | 1 |
| SLO | Blaž Kavčič | 116 | 2 |
| BLR | Ilya Ivashka | 148 | 3 |
| ITA | Lorenzo Sonego | 160 | 4 |
| ITA | Stefano Napolitano | 180 | 5 |
| ITA | Salvatore Caruso | 185 | 6 |
| KOR | Lee Duck-hee | 195 | 7 |
| AUS | Jason Kubler | 201 | 8 |

- ^{1} Rankings are as of 5 March 2018.

=== Other entrants ===
The following players received wildcards into the singles main draw:

- (China) Cui Jie
- (China) Gao Xin
- (China) He Yecong
- (China) Xia Zihao

The following players received entry from the qualifying draw:

- (India) Sriram Balaji
- (South Korea) Chung Yun-seong
- (Latvia) Mārtiņš Podžus
- (Australia) Luke Saville

== Champions ==
=== Singles ===
- (Tunisia) Malek Jaziri def. (Slovenia) Blaž Rola 7–6^{(7–5)}, 6–1.

=== Doubles ===
- (Belarus) Aliaksandr Bury / (Chinese Taipei) Peng Hsien-yin def. (China) Wu Di / (China) Zhang Ze 6–7^{(3–7)}, 6–4, [12–10].
