= 2018 Qujing International Challenger – Doubles =

Doubles
- 2018 Qujing International Challenger

Final
- Champions: (Belarus) Aliaksandr Bury (Chinese Taipei) Peng Hsien-yin
- Runners-up: (China) Wu Di (China) Zhang Ze
- Score: 6–7^{(3–7)}, 6–4, [12–10]

Events
Singles	Doubles
Qujing International Challenger

This was the first edition of the tournament.

Aliaksandr Bury and Peng Hsien-yin won the title after defeating Wu Di and Zhang Ze 6–7^{(3–7)}, 6–4, [12–10] in the final.

== Seeds ==
1. (Belarus) Aliaksandr Bury / (Chinese Taipei) Peng Hsien-yin (champions)
2. (Russia) Mikhail Elgin / (Sweden) Andreas Siljeström (first round)
3. (Australia) Rameez Junaid / (Ukraine) Denys Molchanov (first round)
4. (Spain) Gerard Granollers / (China) Li Zhe (semifinals)

== Draw ==
=== Key ===
- Q = Qualifier
- WC = Wild card
- LL = Lucky loser
- Alt = Alternate
- SE = Special exempt
- PR = Protected ranking
- ITF = ITF entry
- JE = Junior exempt
- w/o = Walkover
- r = Retired
- d = Defaulted
- SR = Special ranking

First round
1	(Belarus) A Bury (Chinese Taipei) H-y Peng	6	7
WC	(China) Wang Ruikai (China) Wang Ruixuan	1	5
(Japan) T Matsui (Japan) Y Takahashi	6	6^{5}	[5]
WC	(China) J Cui (China) Li Yuanfeng	4	7^{7}	[10]
4	(Spain) G Granollers (China) Z Li	6	7^{7}
(India) S Balaji (India) P Gunneswaran	3	6^{2}
(China) X Gao (China) Zh Zhang	6	6
(Japan) Renta Tokuda (Thailand) W Trongcharoenchaikul	2	1
(Italy) S Caruso (Italy) A Pellegrino	5	6	[9]
(Chinese Taipei) T Chen (Poland) K Majchrzak	7	4	[11]
(Italy) L Sonego (Italy) A Vavassori	6	3	[10]
3	(Australia) R Junaid (Ukraine) D Molchanov	3	6	[7]
(Australia) M Banes (Australia) L Saville	6	3	[10]
WC	(China) Y He (China) Xia Zihao	1	6	[7]
(China) D Wu (China) Ze Zhang	7	6
2	(Russia) M Elgin (Sweden) A Siljeström	5	3

Quarterfinals
1	(Belarus) A Bury (Chinese Taipei) H-y Peng	6	6
WC	(China) J Cui (China) Y Li	2	4
4	(Spain) G Granollers (China) Z Li	6	6
(China) X Gao (China) Zh Zhang	3	2
(Chinese Taipei) T Chen (Poland) K Majchrzak	7^{7}	6^{2}	[4]
(Italy) L Sonego (Italy) A Vavassori	6^{5}	7^{7}	[10]
(Australia) M Banes (Australia) L Saville
(China) D Wu (China) Ze Zhang	w/o

Semifinals
1	(Belarus) A Bury (Chinese Taipei) H-y Peng	6	3	[10]
4	(Spain) G Granollers (China) Z Li	4	6	[5]
(Italy) L Sonego (Italy) A Vavassori	4	6	[6]
(China) D Wu (China) Ze Zhang	6	4	[10]

Final
1	(Belarus) A Bury (Chinese Taipei) H-y Peng	6^{3}	6	[12]
(China) D Wu (China) Z Zhang	7^{7}	4	[10]
