= 2012 Geneva Open Challenger =

- Date: 29 October – 4 November
- Edition: 25th
- Surface: Hard
- Location: Geneva, Switzerland

Champions

Singles
- (France) Marc Gicquel

Doubles
- (Sweden) Johan Brunström / (South Africa) Raven Klaasen
← 2011 ·	Geneva Open Challenger	· 2013 →

The 2012 Geneva Open Challenger was a professional tennis tournament played on hard courts. It was the 25th edition of the tournament which was part of the 2012 ATP Challenger Tour. It took place in Geneva, Switzerland between October 29 and November 4, 2012.

== Singles main-draw entrants ==
=== Seeds ===
Country	Player	Rank^{1}	Seed
GER	Tobias Kamke	80	1
CZE	Lukáš Rosol	81	2
SVN	Aljaž Bedene	84	3
GER	Björn Phau	85	4
TUN	Malek Jaziri	89	5
ISR	Dudi Sela	95	6
BEL	Olivier Rochus	104	7
CAN	Vasek Pospisil	109	8

- ^{1} Rankings are as of October 22, 2012.

=== Other entrants ===
The following players received wildcards into the singles main draw:

- (Switzerland) Stéphane Bohli
- (Switzerland) Sandro Ehrat
- (Switzerland) Henri Laaksonen
- (Russia) Alexander Rumyantsev

The following players received entry from the qualifying draw:

- (Switzerland) Adrien Bossel
- (France) Grégoire Burquier
- (France) Jonathan Eysseric
- (Ukraine) Sergiy Stakhovsky

== Champions ==
=== Singles ===
- (France) Marc Gicquel def. (Germany) Matthias Bachinger, 3–6, 6–3, 6–4

=== Doubles ===
- (Sweden) Johan Brunström / (South Africa) Raven Klaasen def. (Germany) Philipp Marx / (Romania) Florin Mergea, 7–6^{(7–2)}, 6–7^{(5–7)}, [10–5]
