= 2010 IPP Trophy =

- Date: August 23 – August 29
- Edition: 23rd
- Location: Geneva, Switzerland

Champions

Singles
- (Bulgaria) Grigor Dimitrov

Doubles
- (Germany) Gero Kretschmer / (Germany) Alex Satschko
← 2009 ·	IPP Trophy	· 2011 →

The 2010 IPP Trophy was a professional tennis tournament played on outdoor clay courts. It was the 23rd edition of the tournament which is part of the 2010 ATP Challenger Tour. It took place in Geneva, Switzerland between 23 and 29 August 2010.

== ATP entrants ==
=== Seeds ===
Nationality	Player	Ranking*	Seeding
ITA	Paolo Lorenzi	104	1
GER	Julian Reister	112	2
ESP	Pablo Andújar	118	3
KAZ	Yuri Schukin	124	4
ESP	Santiago Ventura	126	5
ESP	Albert Ramos-Viñolas	135	6
ESP	Iván Navarro	162	7
FRA	Éric Prodon	237	8

- Rankings are as of August 16, 2010.

=== Other entrants ===
The following players received wildcards into the singles main draw:

- (Russia) Ilya Belyaev
- (Switzerland) Adrien Bossel
- (Serbia) Marko Djokovic
- (Switzerland) Alexander Sadecky

The following players received entry from the qualifying draw:

- (Sweden) Filip Prpic
- (France) Clément Reix
- (France) Alexandre Renard
- (France) Mathieu Rodrigues

== Champions ==
=== Singles ===
(Bulgaria) Grigor Dimitrov def. (Spain) Pablo Andújar, 6–2, 4–6, 6–4

=== Doubles ===
(Germany) Gero Kretschmer / (Germany) Alex Satschko def. (Austria) Philipp Oswald / (Austria) Martin Slanar, 6–3, 4–6, [11–9]
