= 2018 Qujing International Challenger – Singles =

Singles
- 2018 Qujing International Challenger

Final
- Champion: (Tunisia) Malek Jaziri
- Runner-up: (Slovenia) Blaž Rola
- Score: 7–6^{(7–5)}, 6–1

Events
Singles	Doubles
Qujing International Challenger

This was the first edition of the tournament.

Malek Jaziri won the title after defeating Blaž Rola 7–6^{(7–5)}, 6–1 in the final.

== Seeds ==
1. (Tunisia) Malek Jaziri (champion)
2. (Slovenia) Blaž Kavčič (first round)
3. (Belarus) Ilya Ivashka (quarterfinals)
4. (Italy) Lorenzo Sonego (quarterfinals)
5. (Italy) Stefano Napolitano (second round)
6. (Italy) Salvatore Caruso (second round)
7. (South Korea) Lee Duck-hee (first round)
8. (Australia) Jason Kubler (semifinals)

== Draw ==
=== Key ===
- Q = Qualifier
- WC = Wild card
- LL = Lucky loser
- Alt = Alternate
- SE = Special exempt
- PR = Protected ranking
- ITF = ITF entry
- JE = Junior exempt
- w/o = Walkover
- r = Retired
- d = Defaulted
- SR = Special ranking

=== Finals ===
Semifinals
1	(Tunisia) Malek Jaziri	7^{8}	2	6
8	(Australia) Jason Kubler	6^{6}	6	4
(Slovenia) Blaž Rola	7	3	6
(Australia) Alex Bolt	5	6	3

Final
1	(Tunisia) Malek Jaziri	7^{7}	6
(Slovenia) Blaž Rola	6^{5}	1

=== Top half ===
First round
1	(Tunisia) M Jaziri	6	6
Q	(South Korea) Y-s Chung	2	4
Q	(India) S Balaji	4	6	1
(China) Z Li	6	4	6
(India) P Gunneswaran	5	2
(Italy) A Pellegrino	7	6
(China) Zh Zhang	1	1
5	(Italy) S Napolitano	6	6
4	(Italy) L Sonego	6	6
(South Korea) Kim Cheong-eui	1	4
(Japan) H Moriya	6^{3}	6	6
WC	(China) X Gao	7^{7}	4	2
(Spain) G Granollers	6^{4}	3
(China) D Wu	7^{7}	6
Q	(Latvia) M Podžus	4	1
8	(Australia) J Kubler	6	6

Second round
1	(Tunisia) M Jaziri	6	7
(China) Z Li	4	5
(Italy) A Pellegrino	6	6
5	(Italy) S Napolitano	4	2
4	(Italy) L Sonego	6	6
(Japan) H Moriya	2	2
(China) D Wu	6^{3}	4
8	(Australia) J Kubler	7^{7}	6

Quarterfinals
1	(Tunisia) M Jaziri	6	7^{7}
(Italy) A Pellegrino	2	6^{3}
4	(Italy) L Sonego	3	6^{2}
8	(Australia) J Kubler	6	7^{7}

Semifinals
1	(Tunisia) M Jaziri	7^{8}	2	6
8	(Australia) J Kubler	6^{6}	6	4

=== Bottom half ===
First round
6	(Italy) S Caruso	6	6
WC	(China) Xia Zihao	3	1
(Slovenia) B Rola	6	6
WC	(China) Y He	3	2
(China) Ze Zhang	7	7^{7}
Q	(Australia) L Saville	5	6^{4}
WC	(China) J Cui	1	1
3	(Belarus) I Ivashka	6	6
7	(South Korea) D-h Lee	3	3
(Poland) H Hurkacz	6	6
(Japan) Y Takahashi	6	6
(Chinese Taipei) T Chen	2	3
(Australia) A Bolt	3	6	7^{7}
(Australia) M Banes	6	3	6^{3}
(Poland) K Majchrzak	6	6
2	(Slovenia) B Kavčič	3	2

Second round
6	(Italy) S Caruso	3	6^{8}
(Slovenia) B Rola	6	7^{10}
(China) Ze Zhang	3	6	3
3	(Belarus) I Ivashka	6	3	6
(Poland) H Hurkacz	7	6
(Japan) Y Takahashi	5	3
(Australia) A Bolt	6	6
(Poland) K Majchrzak	3	4

Quarterfinals
(Slovenia) B Rola	6	6
3	(Belarus) I Ivashka	4	4
(Poland) H Hurkacz	6^{5}	3
(Australia) A Bolt	7^{7}	6

Semifinals
(Slovenia) B Rola	7	3	6
(Australia) A Bolt	5	6	3
