= 2013 Geneva Open Challenger – Singles =

Singles
- 2013 Geneva Open Challenger

Final
- Champion: (Tunisia) Malek Jaziri
- Runner-up: (Germany) Jan-Lennard Struff
- Score: 6–4, 6–3

Events
Singles	Doubles
- Geneva Open Challenger

Marc Gicquel was the defending champion but chose to compete at the 2013 BNP Paribas Masters.

Malek Jaziri won the title, defeating Jan-Lennard Struff 6–4, 6–3 in the final.

== Seeds ==
1. (Kazakhstan) Mikhail Kukushkin (withdrew)
2. (Russia) Evgeny Donskoy (first round)
3. (Russia) Teymuraz Gabashvili (first round)
4. (Netherlands) Jesse Huta Galung (first round)
5. (Romania) Adrian Ungur (first round)
6. (Slovakia) Martin Kližan (quarterfinals)
7. (Germany) Jan-Lennard Struff (final)
8. (Kazakhstan) Andrey Golubev (quarterfinals)
9. (Slovakia) Andrej Martin (second round)

== Draw ==
Key

- Q = Qualifier
- WC = Wild card
- LL = Lucky loser
- Alt = Alternate
- ITF = ITF entry
- PR = Protected ranking
- SR = Special ranking
- SE = Special exempt
- JE = Junior exempt
- JR = Junior Accelerator Programme entrant
- CO = College Accelerator Programme entrant
- NG = Next Gen Accelerator Program entrant
- w/o = Walkover
- r = Retired
- d = Defaulted

=== Finals ===
Semifinals
(Tunisia) Malek Jaziri	5	7^{7}	7
(Switzerland) Marco Chiudinelli	7	6^{1}	5
7	(Germany) Jan-Lennard Struff	6	6
(Romania) Marius Copil	4	1

Final
(Tunisia) Malek Jaziri	6	6
7	(Germany) Jan-Lennard Struff	4	3

=== Top half ===
First round
9	(Slovakia) A Martin	7^{7}	2	6
Q	(Italy) M Donati	6^{1}	6	1
(Tunisia) M Jaziri	6	6
(Russia) K Kravchuk	3	2
WC	(Switzerland) S Bohli	6^{3}	6	3
(Netherlands) T de Bakker	7^{7}	4	6
Q	(Switzerland) M Lammer	3	3
8	(Kazakhstan) A Golubev	6	6
4	(Netherlands) J Huta Galung	1	1
(Germany) M Bachinger	6	6
(Austria) M Fischer	3	7	6^{5}
(Slovakia) N Gombos	6	5	7^{7}
(Switzerland) M Chiudinelli	6	6
WC	(Switzerland) S Ehrat	1	3
Q	(Switzerland) Y Marti	6	6
5	(Romania) A Ungur	3	2

Second round
9	(Slovakia) A Martin	7	4	2
(Tunisia) M Jaziri	5	6	6
(Netherlands) T de Bakker	5	0
8	(Kazakhstan) A Golubev	7	6
(Germany) M Bachinger	0	7^{7}	5
(Slovakia) N Gombos	6	6^{5}	7
(Switzerland) M Chiudinelli	6	4
Q	(Switzerland) Y Marti	1	0^{r}

Quarterfinals
(Tunisia) M Jaziri	7^{7}	7^{9}
8	(Kazakhstan) A Golubev	6^{5}	6^{7}
(Slovakia) N Gombos	1	6^{4}
(Switzerland) M Chiudinelli	6	7^{7}

Semifinals
(Tunisia) M Jaziri	5	7^{7}	7
(Switzerland) M Chiudinelli	7	6^{1}	5

=== Bottom half ===
First round
7	(Germany) J-L Struff	6	2	7
(Germany) P Gojowczyk	2	6	5
(France) L Pouille	1	7	7
(Switzerland) H Laaksonen	6	5	5
LL	(France) Michael Bois	3	3
WC	(Russia) K Khachanov	6	6
(Italy) T Fabbiano	6	6
3	(Russia) T Gabashvili	4	2
6	(Slovakia) M Kližan	6	6
Q	(France) G Burquier	3	1
(Russia) A Kuznetsov	6	6
WC	(Switzerland) A Ritschard	4	1
(Germany) M Berrer	3	6	4
(Romania) M Copil	6	3	6
LL	(France) L Recouderc	7^{12}	3	6
2	(Russia) E Donskoy	6^{10}	6	2

Second round
7	(Germany) J-L Struff	6	7^{7}
(France) L Pouille	3	6^{4}
WC	(Russia) K Khachanov	7	4	6
(Italy) T Fabbiano	5	6	3
6	(Slovakia) M Kližan	6	7^{11}
(Russia) A Kuznetsov	4	6^{9}
(Romania) M Copil	6	2	6
LL	(France) L Recouderc	4	6	4

Quarterfinals
7	(Germany) J-L Struff	6	6
WC	(Russia) K Khachanov	2	4
6	(Slovakia) M Kližan	3	1
(Romania) M Copil	6	6

Semifinals
7	(Germany) J-L Struff	6	6
(Romania) M Copil	4	1
