= 2012 Geneva Open Challenger – Doubles =

Doubles
- 2012 Geneva Open Challenger

Final
- Champions: (Sweden) Johan Brunström (South Africa) Raven Klaasen
- Runners-up: (Germany) Philipp Marx (Romania) Florin Mergea
- Score: 7–6^{(7–2)}, 6–7^{(5–7)}, [10–5]

Events
Singles	Doubles
- Geneva Open Challenger

Igor Andreev and Evgeny Donskoy were the defending champions but Andreev decided not to participate.
Donskoy played alongside Dmitry Tursunov.
Johan Brunström and Raven Klaasen won the title, defeating Philipp Marx and Florin Mergea 7–6^{(7–2)}, 6–7^{(5–7)}, [10–5] in the final.

== Seeds ==
1. (United Kingdom) Jamie Delgado / (United Kingdom) Ken Skupski (semifinals)
2. (United Kingdom) Jamie Murray / (Brazil) André Sá (first round)
3. (Sweden) Johan Brunström / (South Africa) Raven Klaasen (champions)
4. (Germany) Philipp Marx / (Romania) Florin Mergea (final)

== Draw ==
Key

- Q = Qualifier
- WC = Wild card
- LL = Lucky loser
- Alt = Alternate
- ITF = ITF entry
- PR = Protected ranking
- SR = Special ranking
- SE = Special exempt
- JE = Junior exempt
- JR = Junior Accelerator Programme entrant
- CO = College Accelerator Programme entrant
- NG = Next Gen Accelerator Program entrant
- w/o = Walkover
- r = Retired
- d = Defaulted

=== Draw ===
First round
1	(United Kingdom) J Delgado (United Kingdom) K Skupski	6	6^{3}	[10]
(Germany) M Bachinger (Austria) O Marach	3	7^{7}	[7]
(Czech Republic) L Rosol (Slovakia) I Zelenay	6	6^{4}	[8]
(South Africa) R de Voest (Australia) J Kerr	4	7^{7}	[10]
3	(Sweden) J Brunström (South Africa) R Klaasen	6^{5}	7^{7}	[10]
WC	(Russia) I Kunitsyn (Russia) Alexander Rumyantsev	7^{7}	6^{5}	[5]
WC	(Switzerland) Loïc Perret (Switzerland) Lucas Zweili	4	2
(Croatia) M Draganja (Croatia) L Zovko	6	6
Alt	(Brazil) T Alves (France) O Charroin	3	6	[5]
(Ukraine) I Sergeyev (Ukraine) S Stakhovsky	6	4	[10]
(Serbia) D Lajović (Canada) V Pospisil	4	4
4	(Germany) P Marx (Romania) F Mergea	6	6
(Germany) T Kamke (Germany) M Kohlmann	6^{2}	4
(Australia) C Ebelthite (Czech Republic) J Pospíšil	7^{7}	6
(Russia) E Donskoy (Russia) D Tursunov	4	6	[10]
2	(United Kingdom) J Murray (Brazil) A Sá	6	2	[6]

Quarterfinals
1	(United Kingdom) J Delgado (United Kingdom) K Skupski	6	3	[10]
(South Africa) R de Voest (Australia) J Kerr	3	6	[7]
3	(Sweden) J Brunström (South Africa) R Klaasen	7	6
(Croatia) M Draganja (Croatia) L Zovko	5	4
(Ukraine) I Sergeyev (Ukraine) S Stakhovsky	6^{6}	1
4	(Germany) P Marx (Romania) F Mergea	7^{8}	6
(Australia) C Ebelthite (Czech Republic) J Pospíšil	3	4
(Russia) E Donskoy (Russia) D Tursunov	6	6

Semifinals
1	(United Kingdom) J Delgado (United Kingdom) K Skupski	4	4
3	(Sweden) J Brunström (South Africa) R Klaasen	6	6
4	(Germany) P Marx (Romania) F Mergea	6	6
(Russia) E Donskoy (Russia) D Tursunov	4	4

Final
3	(Sweden) J Brunström (South Africa) R Klaasen	7^{7}	6^{5}	[10]
4	(Germany) P Marx (Romania) F Mergea	6^{2}	7^{7}	[5]
