= Qujing International Challenger =

ATP Challenger Tour
- Event name: Qujing International Challenger
- Location: Qujing, China
- Venue: Qujing Cultural and Sports Park
- Category: ATP Challenger Tour
- Surface: Hard
- Draw: 32S/32Q/16D
- Prize money: $75,000

The Qujing International Challenger was a professional tennis tournament played on hard courts. It was part of the ATP Challenger Tour. It was held in Qujing, China in 2018.

== Past finals ==
=== Singles ===
Year	Champion	Runner-up	Score
2018	(Tunisia) Malek Jaziri	(Slovenia) Blaž Rola	7–6^{(7–5)}, 6–1

=== Doubles ===
Year	Champions	Runners-up	Score
2018	(Belarus) Aliaksandr Bury (Chinese Taipei) Peng Hsien-yin	(China) Wu Di (China) Zhang Ze	6–7^{(3–7)}, 6–4, [12–10]
