= Johan Brunström =

Swedish tennis player

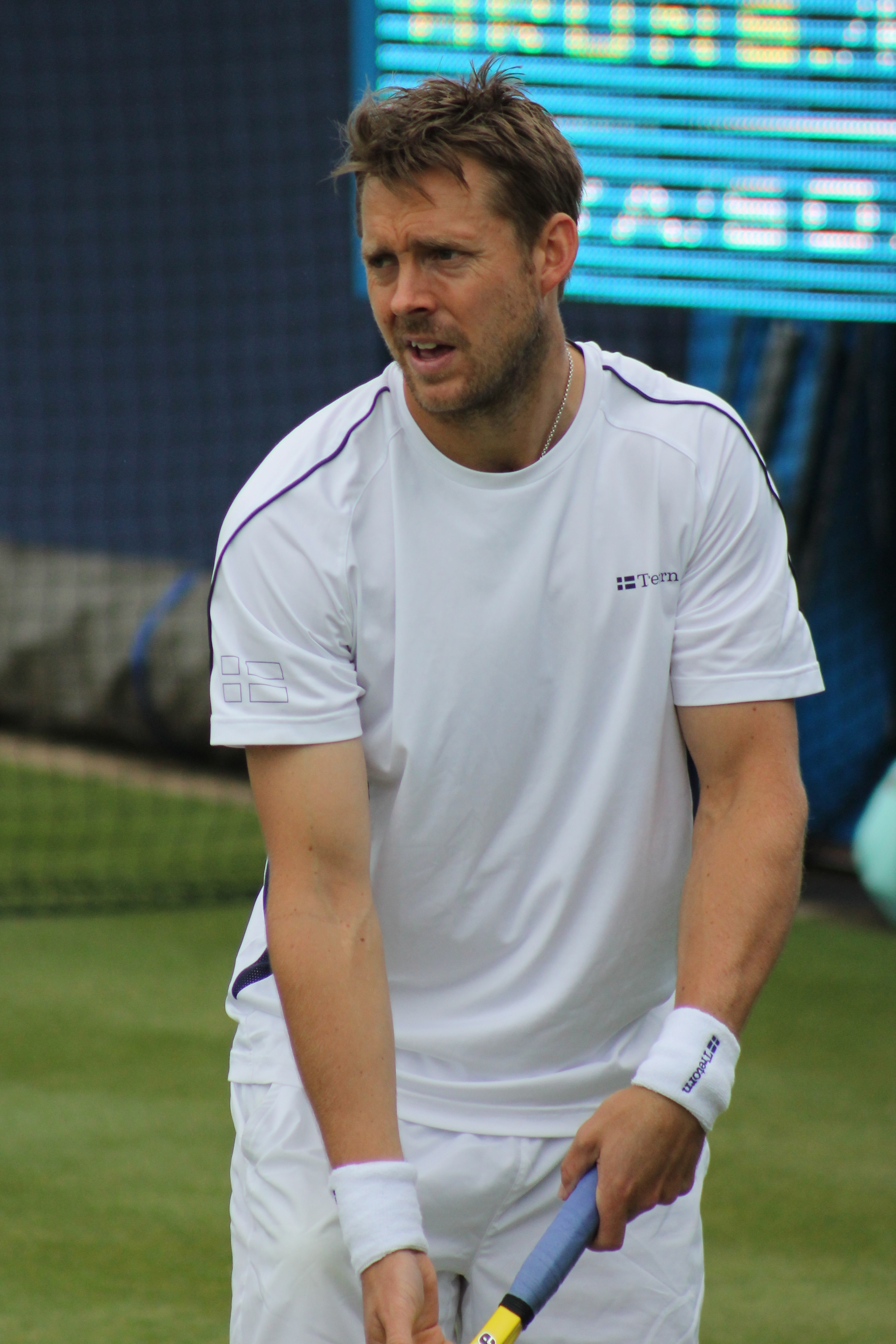
- Johan Brunström at the 2013 Aegon Championships
- Country (sports): Sweden
- Born: 3 April 1980 (age 46) Fiskebackskil, Sweden
- Height: 1.93 m (6 ft 4 in)
- Turned pro: 2005
- Retired: 2017
- Plays: Left handed (two-handed backhand)
- Prize money: US$ 860,455

Singles
- Career record: 0–1
- Career titles: 0; 0 Challenger, 2 Futures
- Highest ranking: No. 377 (24 September 2007)

Doubles
- Career record: 134–165
- Career titles: 5; 26 Challenger, 5 Futures
- Highest ranking: No. 31 (22 March 2010)

Grand Slam doubles results
- Australian Open: 3R (2010)
- French Open: 2R (2009)
- Wimbledon: 2R (2008, 2009, 2012, 2014, 2017)
- US Open: 1R (2008, 2009, 2010, 2011, 2012, 2013, 2014)

Other doubles tournaments
- Olympic Games: 2R (2012)

Grand Slam mixed doubles results
- Australian Open: 1R (2014)
- French Open: 1R (2013, 2014)
- Wimbledon: 3R (2013)
- Last updated on: 26 December 2022.

Johan Brunström (born 3 April 1980) is a former professional Swedish tennis player. His highest ATP doubles ranking is no. 31, which he reached on 22 March 2010. His career high in singles is no. 377, which he reached on 24 September 2007. He made his Davis Cup debut against Serbia in February 2012, with a win in doubles with partner Robert Lindstedt.

In June 2012, he reached the second round of Wimbledon men's doubles partnering Philipp Marx. They lost to David Marrero and Andreas Seppi. At the 2012 Summer Olympics, he reached the second round of the men's doubles with Lindstedt.

== Performance timeline ==
Key
W	F	SF	QF	#R	RR	Q#	DNQ	A	NH

(W) winner; (F) finalist; (SF) semifinalist; (QF) quarterfinalist; (#R) rounds 4, 3, 2, 1; (RR) round-robin stage; (Q#) qualification round; (DNQ) did not qualify; (A) absent; (NH) not held; (SR) strike rate (events won / competed); (W–L) win–loss record.

=== Doubles ===
Tournament	2008	2009	2010	2011	2012	2013	2014	2015	2016	2017	SR	W–L	Win %
Grand Slam tournaments
Australian Open	A	A	3R	1R	A	1R	2R	1R	A	1R	0 / 6	3–6	33%
French Open	1R	2R	1R	1R	1R	1R	1R	1R	A	A	0 / 8	1–8	11%
Wimbledon	2R	2R	1R	1R	2R	1R	2R	Q1	1R	2R	0 / 9	5–9	36%
US Open	1R	1R	1R	1R	1R	1R	1R	A	A	A	0 / 7	0–7	0%
Win–loss	1–3	2–3	2–4	0–4	1–3	0–4	2–4	0–2	0–1	1–2	0 / 30	9–30	23%
National Representation
Summer Olympics	A	Not Held			2R	Not Held			A	NH	0 / 1	1–1	50%
ATP World Tour Masters 1000
Indian Wells	A	A	QF	A	A	A	A	A	A	A	0 / 1	2–1	67%
Miami	A	1R	1R	A	A	A	A	A	A	A	0 / 2	0–2	0%
Rome	A	A	1R	A	A	A	A	A	A	A	0 / 1	0–1	0%
Madrid	A	A	1R	A	A	A	A	A	A	A	0 / 1	0–1	0%
Paris	A	2R	A	A	A	A	A	A	A	A	0 / 1	1–1	50%
Win–loss	0–0	1–2	2–4	0–0	0–0	0–0	0–0	0–0	0–0	0–0	0 / 6	3–6	33%
Titles / Finals	0 / 2	0 / 4	1 / 2	0 / 2	0 / 1	2 / 5	2 / 2	0 / 0	0 / 1	0 / 0	5 / 19		
Overall win–loss	10–10	18–21	21–26	8–17	11–18	29–16	20–19	4–14	7–13	3–9	134–165		45%
Year-end ranking	74	42	63	91	71	46	55	112	72		Prize Money: $860,455		

== ATP career finals ==
=== Doubles: 19 (5 titles, 14 runner-ups) ===
Legend Grand Slam Tournaments (0–0) ATP World Tour Finals (0–0) ATP Masters Series (0–0) ATP Championship Series (0–0) ATP World Series (5–14)	Finals by surface Hard (3–7) Clay (2–3) Grass (0–2) Carpet (0–0)	Finals by setting Outdoors (3–10) Indoors (2–4)

Result	W–L	Date	Tournament	Tier	Surface	Partner	Opponents	Score
Loss	0–1	Jul 2008	Båstad, Sweden	International Series	Clay	(Netherlands Antilles) Jean-Julien Rojer	(Sweden) Jonas Björkman (Sweden) Robin Söderling	2–6, 2–6
Loss	0–2	Oct 2008	Stockholm, Sweden	International Series	Clay	(Sweden) Michael Ryderstedt	(Sweden) Jonas Björkman (Zimbabwe) Kevin Ullyett	1–6, 3–6
Loss	0–3	May 2009	Belgrade, Serbia	250 Series	Clay	(Netherlands Antilles) Jean-Julien Rojer	(Poland) Łukasz Kubot (Austria) Oliver Marach	2–6, 6–7^{(3–7)}
Loss	0–4	Jun 2009	's-Hertogenbosch, Netherlands	250 Series	Grass	(Netherlands Antilles) Jean-Julien Rojer	(Belgium) Dick Norman (South Africa) Wesley Moodie	6–7^{(3–7)}, 7–6^{(7–3)}, [5–10]
Loss	0–5	Aug 2009	Umag, Croatia	250 Series	Clay	(Netherlands Antilles) Jean-Julien Rojer	(Slovakia) Michal Mertiňák (Czech Republic) František Čermák	4–6, 4–6
Loss	0–6	Sep 2009	Bucharest, Romania	250 Series	Clay	(Netherlands Antilles) Jean-Julien Rojer	(Slovakia) Michal Mertiňák (Czech Republic) František Čermák	2–6, 4–6
Win	1–6	Aug 2010	Gstaad, Switzerland	250 Series	Hard	(Finland) Jarkko Nieminen	(Brazil) Marcelo Melo (Brazil) Bruno Soares	6–3, 6–7^{(4–7)}, [11–9]
Loss	1–7	Oct 2010	Stockholm, Sweden	250 Series	Hard	(Finland) Jarkko Nieminen	(United States) Eric Butorac (Netherlands Antilles) Jean-Julien Rojer	3–6, 4–6
Loss	1–8	Jan 2011	Auckland, New Zealand	250 Series	Hard	(Australia) Stephen Huss	(Spain) Marcel Granollers (Spain) Tommy Robredo	4–6, 6–7^{(6–8)}
Loss	1–9	Jul 2011	Newport, United States	250 Series	Grass	(Canada) Adil Shamasdin	(United States) Ryan Harrison (Australia) Matthew Ebden	6–4, 3–6, [5–10]
Loss	1–10	Sep 2012	Metz, France	250 Series	Hard	(Denmark) Frederik Nielsen	(France) Nicolas Mahut (France) Édouard Roger-Vasselin	6–7^{(3–7)}, 4–6
Loss	1–11	Jan 2013	Auckland, New Zealand	250 Series	Hard	(Denmark) Frederik Nielsen	(United Kingdom) Colin Fleming (Brazil) Bruno Soares	6–7^{(1–7)}, 6–7^{(2–7)}
Loss	1–12	Feb 2013	Montpellier, France	250 Series	Hard	(South Africa) Raven Klaasen	(France) Marc Gicquel (France) Michaël Llodra	3–6, 6–3, [9–11]
Win	2–12	May 2013	Nice, France	250 Series	Clay	(South Africa) Raven Klaasen	(Colombia) Juan Sebastián Cabal (Colombia) Robert Farah	6–3, 6–2
Win	3–12	Sep 2013	Metz, France	250 Series	Hard	(South Africa) Raven Klaasen	(France) Nicolas Mahut (France) Jo-Wilfried Tsonga	6–4, 7–6^{(7–5)}
Loss	3–13	Sep 2013	Bangkok, Thailand	250 Series	Hard	(Poland) Tomasz Bednarek	(United Kingdom) Jamie Murray (Australia) John Peers	3–6, 6–3, [6–10]
Win	4–13	Jan 2014	Chennai, India	250 Series	Hard	(Denmark) Frederik Nielsen	(Croatia) Marin Draganja (Croatia) Mate Pavić	6–2, 4–6, [10–7]
Win	5–13	Jul 2014	Båstad, Sweden	250 Series	Clay	(United States) Nicholas Monroe	(France) Jérémy Chardy (Austria) Oliver Marach	4–6, 7–6^{(7–5)}, [10–7]
Loss	5–14	Aug 2016	Atlanta, United States	250 Series	Hard	(Sweden) Andreas Siljeström	(Argentina) Andrés Molteni (Argentina) Horacio Zeballos	6–7^{(2–7)}, 4–6

== ATP Challenger and ITF Futures finals ==
=== Singles: 5 (2–3) ===
Legend ATP Challenger (0–0) ITF Futures (2–3)	Finals by surface Hard (1–2) Clay (1–1) Grass (0–0) Carpet (0–0)

Result	W–L	Date	Tournament	Tier	Surface	Opponent	Score
Loss	0–1	Jul 2004	Denmark F2, Hørsholm	Futures	Clay	(Latvia) Andis Juška	7–6^{(7–3)}, 3–6, 5–7
Loss	0–2	Mar 2006	USA F6, McAllen	Futures	Hard	(Germany) Benedikt Dorsch	6–3, 2–6, 1–6
Loss	0–3	Sep 2006	Sweden F5, Gothenburg	Futures	Hard	(Sweden) Ervin Eleskovic	3–6, 3–6
Win	1–3	Oct 2006	Australia F11, Melbourne	Futures	Hard	(Australia) Alun Jones	6–3, 6–4
Win	2–3	Jul 2007	Norway F3, Oslo	Futures	Clay	(Italy) Fabio Colangelo	6–7^{(5–7)}, 6–4, 6–3

=== Doubles: 54 (32–22) ===
Legend ATP Challenger (27–9) ITF Futures (5–13)	Finals by surface Hard (17–7) Clay (14–14) Grass (0–1) Carpet (1–0)

Result	W–L	Date	Tournament	Tier	Surface	Partner	Opponents	Score
Loss	0–1	Aug 2000	Lithuania F1, Vilnius	Futures	Clay	(Sweden) Tobias Steinel-Hansson	(Slovenia) Andrej Kračman (Slovenia) Marko Tkalec	3–6, 2–6
Win	1–1	Aug 2001	Estonia F1, Pärnu	Futures	Clay	(Sweden) Jon Wallmark	(Greece) Nikos Rovas (Greece) Anastasios Vasiliadis	6–2, 6–4
Loss	1–2	Jun 2003	Finland F2, Vierumäki	Futures	Clay	(Sweden) Alexander Hartman	(Sweden) Rickard Holmstrom (Sweden) Ola Jonsson	6–7^{(6–8)}, 6–4, 3–6
Loss	1–3	Jul 2004	Denmark F1, Helsingør	Futures	Clay	(Sweden) Alexander Hartman	(Denmark) Frederik Nielsen (Denmark) Rasmus Nørby	3–6, 3–6
Win	2–3	Aug 2004	Estonia F1, Tallinn	Futures	Clay	(Sweden) Alexander Hartman	(Netherlands) Bart Beks (Estonia) Mait Künnap	7–6^{(8–6)}, 7–6^{(7–3)}
Loss	2–4	Aug 2005	Lithuania F2, Vilnius	Futures	Clay	(Finland) Lauri Kiiski	(Lithuania) Rolandas Muraska (Israel) Dekel Valtzer	3–6, 6–2, 3–6
Loss	2–5	Sep 2005	Sweden F1, Gothenburg	Futures	Hard	(Sweden) Alexander Hartman	(Sweden) Rickard Holmstrom (Sweden) Christian Johansson	4–6, 2–6
Loss	2–6	Oct 2005	USA F27, Waco	Futures	Hard	(United States) Philip Stolt	(Germany) Benjamin Becker (United States) Jason Marshall	3–6, 6–7^{(4–7)}
Win	3–6	Jan 2006	Austria F1, Salzburg	Futures	Carpet	(United States) Philip Stolt	(Austria) Werner Eschauer (Germany) Christopher Kas	6–3, 6–4
Loss	3–7	Mar 2006	USA F5, Harlingen	Futures	Hard	(United States) Philip Stolt	(United States) Brendan Evans (United States) Tim Smyczek	6–7^{(4–7)}, 3–6
Loss	3–8	May 2006	Czech Republic F1, Most	Futures	Clay	(Germany) Daniel Brands	(Czech Republic) Roman Vögeli (Czech Republic) Lukáš Rosol	2–6, 7–5, 6–7^{(5–7)}
Loss	3–9	Sep 2006	Sweden F4, Gothenburg	Futures	Hard	(Sweden) Robert Gustafsson	(Sweden) Rickard Holmstrom (Sweden) Christian Johansson	7–6^{(7–4)}, 5–7, 2–6
Win	4–9	Oct 2006	Sweden F6, Falun	Futures	Hard	(Sweden) Marcus Sarstrand	(Sweden) Daniel Danilović (Sweden) Ervin Eleskovic	6–7^{(8–10)}, 7–6^{(7–4)}, 6–2
Loss	4–10	Nov 2006	Australia F13, Berri	Futures	Grass	(United States) Philip Stolt	(Australia) Carsten Ball (Australia) Adam Feeney	6–4, 6–7^{(2–7)}, [9–11]
Loss	4–11	May 2007	Poland F2, Zabrze	Futures	Clay	(United States) Philip Stolt	(Austria) Andreas Haider-Maurer (Austria) Armin Sandbichler	6–3, 2–6, 2–6
Loss	4–12	Jun 2007	Poland F3, Kraków	Futures	Clay	(Sweden) Robert Gustafsson	(Sweden) Kalle Flygt (Kuwait) Mohammad Ghareeb	4–6, 7–6^{(8–6)}, 4–6
Win	5–12	Jun 2007	Poland F4, Koszalin	Futures	Clay	(Kuwait) Mohammad Ghareeb	(Poland) Mateusz Kowalczyk (Poland) Grzegorz Panfil	6–3, 6–7^{(5–7)}, 7–6^{(7–5)}
Win	6–12	Jul 2007	Tolyatti, Russia	Challenger	Hard	(Kuwait) Mohammad Ghareeb	(Croatia) Ivan Cerović (France) Pierrick Ysern	7–6^{(7–4)}, 4–6, [13–11]
Win	7–12	Aug 2007	Tampere, Finland	Challenger	Clay	(Kuwait) Mohammad Ghareeb	(Finland) Jukka Kohtamaki (Finland) Mika Purho	6–2, 7–6^{(7–5)}
Loss	7–13	Sep 2007	Swedem F4, Gothenburg	Futures	Hard	(Sweden) Rickard Holmstrom	(United Kingdom) Josh Goodall (United Kingdom) Tom Rushby	6–7^{(4–7)}, 6–4, [11–13]
Win	8–13	Mar 2008	Sarajevo, Bosnia & Herzegovina	Challenger	Hard	(Denmark) Frederik Nielsen	(Austria) Alexander Peya (Croatia) Lovro Zovko	6–4, 7–6^{(7–4)}
Win	9–13	Jul 2008	Córdoba, Spain	Challenger	Hard	(Netherlands Antilles) Jean-Julien Rojer	(United States) James Cerretani (Belgium) Dick Norman	6–4, 6–3
Win	10–13	Jul 2008	Poznań, Poland	Challenger	Clay	(Netherlands Antilles) Jean-Julien Rojer	(Colombia) Santiago Giraldo (Spain) Alberto Martín	4–6, 6–0, [10–6]
Loss	10–14	Nov 2008	Busan, South Korea	Challenger	Hard	(Netherlands Antilles) Jean-Julien Rojer	(South Africa) Rik de Voest (Australia) Ashley Fisher	2–6, 6–2, [6–10]
Win	11–14	Jan 2009	Iqique, Chile	Challenger	Clay	(Netherlands Antilles) Jean-Julien Rojer	(Uruguay) Pablo Cuevas (Argentina) Horacio Zeballos	6–3, 6–4
Loss	11–15	Apr 2009	Rome, Italy	Challenger	Clay	(Netherlands Antilles) Jean-Julien Rojer	(Germany) Simon Greul (Germany) Christopher Kas	6–4, 6–7^{(2–7)}, [2–10]
Loss	11–16	May 2009	Tunis, Tunisia	Challenger	Clay	(Netherlands Antilles) Jean-Julien Rojer	(Argentina) Brian Dabul (Argentina) Leonardo Mayer	4–6, 6–7^{(6–8)}
Win	12–16	Jun 2009	Prostějov, Czech Republic	Challenger	Clay	(Netherlands Antilles) Jean-Julien Rojer	(Uruguay) Pablo Cuevas (Slovakia) Dominik Hrbatý	6–2, 6–3
Win	13–16	Jun 2009	Lugano, Switzerland	Challenger	Clay	(Netherlands Antilles) Jean-Julien Rojer	(Uruguay) Pablo Cuevas (Argentina) Sergio Roitman	walkover
Win	14–16	Jul 2009	Braunschweig, Germany	Challenger	Clay	(Netherlands Antilles) Jean-Julien Rojer	(Argentina) Brian Dabul (Chile) Nicolás Massú	7–6^{(7–2)}, 6–4
Loss	14–17	Aug 2009	San Marino, San Marino	Challenger	Clay	(Netherlands Antilles) Jean-Julien Rojer	(Argentina) Lucas Arnold Ker (Argentina) Sebastián Prieto	6–7^{(4–7)}, 6–2, [7–10]
Loss	14–18	Jun 2010	Prostějov, Czech Republic	Challenger	Clay	(Netherlands Antilles) Jean-Julien Rojer	(Spain) David Marrero (Spain) Marcel Granollers	6–3, 4–6, [6–10]
Win	15–18	Apr 2011	Monza, Italy	Challenger	Clay	(Denmark) Frederik Nielsen	(United Kingdom) Jamie Delgado (United Kingdom) Jonathan Marray	5–7, 6–2, [10–7]
Win	16–18	Aug 2011	Segovia, Spain	Challenger	Hard	(Denmark) Frederik Nielsen	(France) Nicolas Mahut (Croatia) Lovro Zovko	6–2, 3–6, [10–6]
Win	17–18	Oct 2011	Mons, Belgium	Challenger	Hard	(United Kingdom) Ken Skupski	(France) Kenny de Schepper (France) Édouard Roger-Vasselin	7–6^{(7–4)}, 6–3
Win	18–18	Jan 2012	Heilbronn, Germany	Challenger	Hard	(Denmark) Frederik Nielsen	(Philippines) Treat Huey (United Kingdom) Dominic Inglot	6–3, 3–6, [10–6]
Win	19–18	Apr 2012	Barletta, Italy	Challenger	Clay	(Belgium) Dick Norman	(United Kingdom) Jonathan Marray (Slovakia) Igor Zelenay	6–4, 7–5
Win	20–18	Apr 2012	Sarasota, United States	Challenger	Clay	(South Africa) Izak van der Merwe	(Sweden) Andreas Siljeström (Germany) Martin Emmrich	6–4, 6–1
Win	21–18	Nov 2012	Geneva, Switzerland	Challenger	Hard	(South Africa) Raven Klaasen	(Germany) Philipp Marx (Romania) Florin Mergea	7–6^{(7–2)}, 6–7^{(5–7)}, [10–5]
Win	22–18	Jan 2013	Heilbronn, Germany	Challenger	Hard	(South Africa) Raven Klaasen	(Australia) Jordan Kerr (Sweden) Andreas Siljeström	6–3, 0–6, [12–10]
Win	23–18	Feb 2013	Quimper, France	Challenger	Hard	(South Africa) Raven Klaasen	(United Kingdom) Jamie Delgado (United Kingdom) Ken Skupski	3–6, 6–2, [10–3]
Win	24–18	Nov 2014	Geneva, Switzerland	Challenger	Hard	(United States) Nicholas Monroe	(Austria) Oliver Marach (Austria) Philipp Oswald	5–7, 7–5, [10–6]
Win	25–18	Jul 2015	Winnetka, United States	Challenger	Hard	(United States) Nicholas Monroe	(United States) Sekou Bangoura (Canada) Frank Dancevic	4–6, 6–3, [10–8]
Win	26–18	Oct 2015	Tiburon, United States	Challenger	Hard	(Denmark) Frederik Nielsen	(Australia) Carsten Ball (Australia) Matt Reid	7–6^{(7–2)}, 6–1
Win	27–18	Oct 2015	Fairfield, United States	Challenger	Hard	(Denmark) Frederik Nielsen	(Australia) Carsten Ball (Jamaica) Dustin Brown	6–3, 5–7, [10–5]
Win	28–18	Nov 2015	Knoxville, United States	Challenger	Hard	(Denmark) Frederik Nielsen	(United States) Matthew Seeberger (United States) Sekou Bangoura	6–1, 6–2
Win	29–18	Jan 2016	Bangkok, Thasiland	Challenger	Hard	(Sweden) Andreas Siljeström	(Germany) Gero Kretschmer (Germany) Alexander Satschko	6–3, 6–4
Win	30–18	Jan 2016	Manila, Philippines	Challenger	Hard	(Denmark) Frederik Nielsen	(Philippines) Francis Casey Alcantara (Indonesia) Christopher Rungkat	6–2, 6–2
Win	31–18	Apr 2016	Barletta, Italy	Challenger	Clay	(Sweden) Andreas Siljeström	(Italy) Flavio Cipolla (Brazil) Rogério Dutra Silva	0–6, 6–4, [10–8]
Win	32–18	May 2016	Bordeaux, France	Challenger	Clay	(Sweden) Andreas Siljeström	(Argentina) Guillermo Durán (Argentina) Máximo González	6–1, 3–6, [10–4]
Loss	32–19	Jul 2016	Båstad, Sweden	Challenger	Clay	(Sweden) Andreas Siljeström	(Sweden) Isak Arvidsson (Sweden) Fred Simonsson	3–6, 5–7
Loss	32–20	Sep 2016	Szczecin, Poland	Challenger	Clay	(Sweden) Andreas Siljeström	(Germany) Andre Begemann (Belarus) Aliaksandr Bury	6–7^{(3–7)}, 7–6^{(9–7)}, [4–10]
Loss	32–21	Nov 2016	Mouilleron-le-Captif, France	Challenger	Hard	(Sweden) Andreas Siljeström	(France) Jonathan Eysseric (France) Édouard Roger-Vasselin	7–6^{(7–1)}, 6–7^{(3–7)}, [9–11]
Loss	32–22	Aug 2017	Biella, Italy	Challenger	Clay	(Croatia) Dino Marcan	(Hungary) Attila Balázs (Brazil) Fabiano de Paula	7–5, 4–6, [4–10]
