= Malek Jaziri =

Tunisian tennis player (born 1984)

Malek Jaziri مالك الجزيري
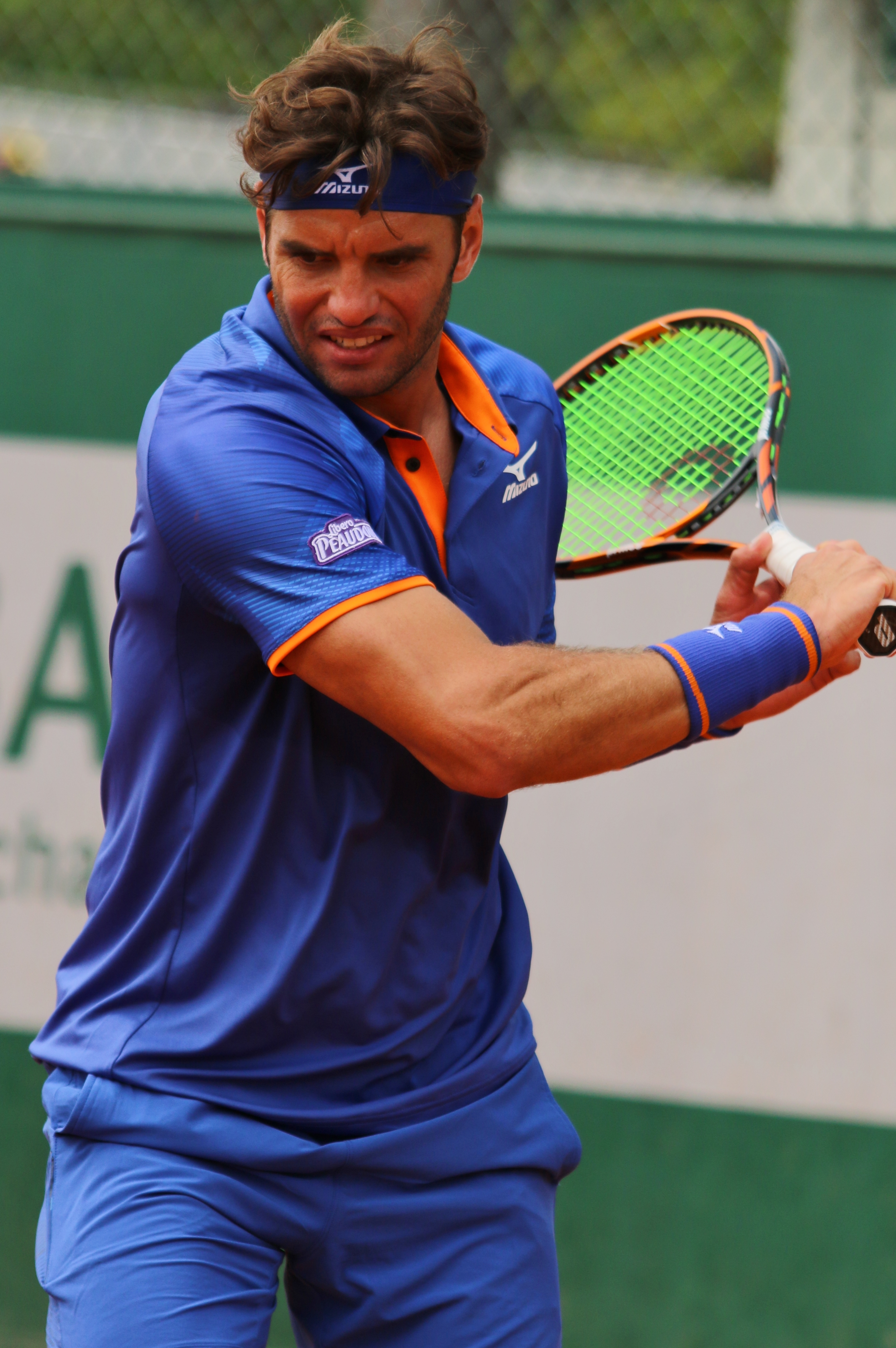
- Jaziri at the 2019 French Open
- Country (sports): Tunisia
- Residence: Tunis, Tunisia
- Born: January 20, 1984 (age 42) Bizerte, Tunisia
- Height: 1.85 m (6 ft 1 in)
- Turned pro: 2003
- Retired: May 2023
- Plays: Right-handed (two-handed backhand) *occasionally uses one-handed backhand
- Coach: Dejan Petrović, Haythem Abid (throughout his career)
- Prize money: US$4,050,966

Singles
- Career record: 104–145
- Career titles: 0
- Highest ranking: No. 42 (7 January 2019)

Grand Slam singles results
- Australian Open: 3R (2015, 2017)
- French Open: 2R (2012, 2016, 2018)
- Wimbledon: 2R (2012)
- US Open: 2R (2011, 2017)

Other tournaments
- Olympic Games: 2R (2012)

Doubles
- Career record: 32–61
- Career titles: 0
- Highest ranking: No. 73 (12 August 2019)

Grand Slam doubles results
- Australian Open: 3R (2019)
- French Open: 2R (2017)
- Wimbledon: 2R (2015, 2016)
- US Open: SF (2018)
Medal record
Pan Arab Games
Gold medal – first place	2011 Doha	Singles
Silver medal – second place	2011 Doha	Doubles
Mediterranean Games
Silver medal – second place	2013 Mersin	Doubles
Bronze medal – third place	2013 Mersin	Singles

Malek Jaziri (Arabic: مالك الجزيري, romanized: Mālik al-Jazīrī; born January 20, 1984) is a Tunisian former professional tennis player. Jaziri reached his highest singles ranking on the ATP Tour of World No. 42 in January 2019. He primarily played on the Futures and Challenger Tour.

Jaziri has been a member of the Tunisia Davis Cup team since 2000, posting an 33–15 record in singles and a 10–14 record in doubles in 41 ties.

He reached the final of the 2018 Istanbul Open, the semifinals in Moscow in 2012, Winston-Salem in 2015, Dubai in 2018 and the quarterfinals in Dubai in 2014.

== Career ==
=== 2010 ===
He appeared in the qualifying draw at the 2010 Australian Open, losing in the first round to Michał Przysiężny of Poland.

=== 2011: Grand Slam debut ===
Jaziri qualified for the 2011 US Open, defeating Brian Dabul, Michael Ryderstedt, and Guillaume Rufin in the qualifying draw. This was the first time Jaziri played in the main draw of a Grand Slam tournament. In the first round, Jaziri defeated world No. 159, Thiemo de Bakker, in four sets. Jaziri lost to world No. 8, Mardy Fish, in the second round.

=== 2012: Top 100 debut ===
In 2012, he kicked off his year at the ATP 250 event in Doha as a wildcard and pushed world No. 6, Jo-Wilfried Tsonga, to three sets in the first round. He fell in the first round of qualifying at the 2012 Australian Open to Tim Smyczek. He then reached three Challenger finals in Quimper, Kyoto, and Pingguo to break into the top 100 for the first time.

In his clay-court season, he made the semifinals in the Barletta Challenger and played his first Roland Garros main draw, winning his first-round match over German Philipp Petzschner before losing a tight second-round match to Spaniard Marcel Granollers, missing two match points.

On grass, he reached the second round in his 2012 Wimbledon Championships debut (lost to Kohlschreiber) and also the second round at the London Olympics (lost to John Isner).

He lost in the 2012 US Open first round, but later had his best result on the ATP World Tour when he reached the semifinals of the 2012 Kremlin Cup in Moscow, where he lost to eventual champion Andreas Seppi, to become the first Tunisian male to reach the semifinals of an ATP event.

=== 2013: Loss of form, out of top 200 ===
In 2013, Jaziri started off the year in Dubai as a wildcard, where he faced 17-time Grand Slam champion, Roger Federer and lost in three tight sets.

=== 2015-2017: Two Australian Open third rounds, top 50 ===
Jaziri started off 2015 by making his first appearance at the Australian Open main draw, and beating Mikhail Kukushkin and Edouard Roger-Vasselin, making him the first Arab male tennis player to make it to the third round of a Grand Slam in over a decade. Jaziri then lost in the third round to Australian teen Nick Kyrgios.

He reached the top 50 on 3 October 2016. He also reached the third round again at the 2017 Australian Open.

=== 2018-2019: First ATP final, Career high ranking in top 45 ===
In 2018, he played against Gilles Müller at the Australian Open.

At the Dubai Tennis Championships, Jaziri as a wildcard, stunned top seed and then world No. 4, Grigor Dimitrov, to register his first win against a top-10 player. He reached the semifinals defeating Robin Haase and wildcard Stefanos Tsitsipas.

Jaziri made his first ATP final at the 2018 Istanbul Open, where he played Japanese-American Taro Daniel, who had also reached his maiden final and won the title.

=== 2020-2023: Eight wildcards in Doha and Dubai, Retirement ===
Before the COVID season, he received a wildcard for the 2020 Qatar ExxonMobil Open and for the 2020 Dubai Tennis Championships.

At the 2021 Qatar Open, Jaziri recorded as a wildcard, his 100th win on the ATP Tour against Norbert Gombos. He received a wildcard for the next 2022 edition in Qatar (his eight overall at this tournament) as well as for Dubai in 2021, 2022, and in 2023 (his eight overall at this tournament) where he officially retired. In May, he entered the main draw of his home Challenger tournament, the 2023 Tunis Open as a wildcard and played his last match against compatriot Aziz Dougaz.

=== Coaching ===
Until 2025, Jaziri was coaching Vasek Pospisil and was the captain of Tunisia’s Davis Cup team.

== ITIA 9-month tour ban ==
In November 2025, it was announced that Jaziri was given a nine-month ban by the International Tennis Integrity Association (ITIA) that started on 28 October 2025 and would finish on 27 July 2026 after accepting sanctions for violating the Tennis Anti-Corruption Program wildcard rules. He admitted to one instance between 2022-23 of paying and offering to pay for wildcards for himself and/or a doubles partner.

== Controversies ==
=== 2013 ===
Jaziri was embroiled in a controversial political incident, in which he withdrew from a tournament rather than play an Israeli player. In the October 2013 Tashkent Challenger, tournament in Tashkent, Uzbekistan, he was slated to play Israeli Amir Weintraub in the quarterfinals. But the Tunisian tennis federation ordered Jaziri by email to withdraw from the match, and he did so.

Weintraub said that Jaziri is "a good friend," and that "he really wanted to play." Israel Tennis Association CEO Shlomo Glickstein said: "It is sad to me that these kinds of things still happen. I feel bad for the athletes who find themselves embroiled in such situations, which end up hurting their careers.”

Jaziri was cleared of wrongdoing by the ATP, but the International Tennis Federation (ITF) found that the Tunisian Tennis Federation breached the ITF constitution by ordering him not to compete. The organization barred Tunisia from competing in the 2014 Davis Cup. ITF president Francesco Ricci Bitti said: "There is no room for prejudice of any kind in sport or in society. The ITF Board decided to send a strong message to the Tunisian Tennis Federation that this kind of action will not be tolerated by any of our members."

=== 2015 ===
In February 2015, Jaziri was again embroiled in a controversial political incident when he withdrew from a tournament before facing Israeli players. He withdrew from both the singles and doubles events at the Open Sud de France, citing an elbow injury, after winning his first set in his singles match against Denis Istomin of Uzbekistan. Had Jaziri won, he would have been scheduled to face Israeli Dudi Sela in the next round. In the doubles event, he and Spanish partner Marc López would have faced Israeli opponent Jonathan Erlich and František Čermák of the Czech Republic in the quarterfinals.

The ATP said that they had confirmed with on-site medical staff that Jaziri's elbow injury was genuine, but opened an inquiry, stating: "Given a previous incident involving the player's national federation in 2013, we are looking into any wider circumstances of his withdrawal as a matter of prudence." On February 10, the ATP closed its investigation after extensive discussions with Jaziri and medical staff, saying it was satisfied that Jaziri had a legitimate medical reason to retire from the event.

== ATP career finals ==
=== Singles: 1 (1 runner-up) ===
Legend Grand Slam tournaments (0–0) ATP World Tour Finals (0–0) ATP World Tour Masters 1000 (0–0) ATP World Tour 500 Series (0–0) ATP World Tour 250 Series (0–1)	Finals by surface Hard (0–0) Clay (0–1) Grass (0–0)

Result	W–L	Date	Tournament	Tier	Surface	Opponent	Score
Loss	0–1	May 2018	Istanbul Open, Turkey	250 Series	Clay	(Japan) Taro Daniel	6–7^{(4–7)}, 4–6

== Future and Challenger finals ==
=== Singles: 35 (17–18) ===
Legend (singles) ATP Challenger Tour (8–6) ITF Futures Tour (9–12)	Titles by surface Hard (13–9) Clay (3–8) Grass (1–0) Carpet (0–1)

Result	W–L	Date	Tournament	Tier	Surface	Opponent	Score
Loss	0–1	Jun 2004	Tunisia F2, Tunis	Futures	Clay	(France) Dimitri Lorin	6–0, 0–6, 6–7^{(3–7)}
Loss	0–2	Nov 2004	Tunisia F4, Sfax	Futures	Hard	(Serbia and Montenegro) Ilija Bozoljac	5–7, 6–3, 5–7
Loss	0–3	May 2005	Italy F13, Grottaglie	Futures	Clay	(Russia) Andrey Golubev	3–6, 6–7^{(3–7)}
Win	1–3	Jun 2005	Tunisia F3, Nabeul	Futures	Clay	(Serbia and Montenegro) Petar Popović	1–6, 6–2, 6–3
Loss	1–4	Aug 2005	Iran F1, Tehran	Futures	Clay	(Austria) Philipp Müllner	3–6, 6–7^{(5–7)}
Loss	1–5	Aug 2005	Iran F2, Tehran	Futures	Clay	(Monaco) Benjamin Balleret	4–6, 0–3 RET
Loss	1–6	Feb 2006	France F2, Feucherolles	Futures	Hard (i)	(Algeria) Slimane Saoudi	7–5, 6–7^{(6–8)}, 3–6
Win	2–6	Dec 2006	Tunisia F7, Mégrine	Futures	Hard	(Slovenia) Blaž Kavčič	4–6, 6–1, 6–4
Loss	2–7	May 2009	Kuwait F1, Meshref	Futures	Hard	(Kuwait) Mohammad Ghareeb	4–6, 4–6
Loss	2–8	May 2009	Kuwait F2, Meshref	Futures	Hard	(Kuwait) Mohammad Ghareeb	3–6, 6–7^{(3–7)}
Loss	2–9	Jun 2009	Tunisia F1, Hammamet	Futures	Clay	(Morocco) Reda El Amrani	0–6, 3–6
Win	3–9	Jun 2009	Tunisia F3, Kelibia	Futures	Hard	(Tunisia) Mohamed Haythem Abid	7–6^{(7–3)}, 5–7, 7–6^{(7–5)}
Win	4–9	Jul 2009	Georgia F2, Tbilisi	Futures	Clay	(Serbia) David Savić	4–6, 6–4, 6–4
Loss	4–10	Mar 2010	Italy F2, Rome	Futures	Clay	(Austria) Andreas Haider-Maurer	3–6, 5–7
Loss	4–11	Jun 2010	Tunisia F1, Tunis	Futures	Clay	(Spain) Sergio Gutiérrez Ferrol	4–6, 2–6
Win	5–11	Jun 2010	Tunisia F2, Sfax	Futures	Hard	(France) Laurent Rochette	6–4, 6–3
Win	6–11	Oct 2010	Spain F36, Córdoba	Futures	Hard	(Spain) Pablo Carreño Busta	6–4, 5–7, 6–4
Loss	6–12	Feb 2011	Colombia F1, Cartagena	Futures	Hard	(Portugal) Gastão Elias	3–6, 3–6
Win	7–12	May 2011	Great Britain F7, Newcastle	Futures	Clay	(Belgium) Yannick Mertens	6–3, 6–4
Win	8–12	Jul 2011	Great Britain F8, Manchester	Futures	Grass	(France) Rudy Coco	7–6^{(7–3)}, 4–6, 6–2
Win	9–12	Aug 2011	Kazakhstan F4, Almaty	Futures	Hard	(Ukraine) Denys Molchanov	6–3, 6–2
Loss	9–13	Aug 2011	Samarkand, Uzbekistan	Challenger	Clay	(Uzbekistan) Denis Istomin	6–7^{(2–7)}, 0–0 RET
Win	10–13	Nov 2011	Geneva, Switzerland	Challenger	Hard (i)	(Germany) Mischa Zverev	4–6, 6–3, 6–3
Loss	10–14	Feb 2012	Quimper, France	Challenger	Hard (i)	(Netherlands) Igor Sijsling	3–6, 4–6
Loss	10–15	Mar 2012	Kyoto, Japan	Challenger	Carpet (i)	(Japan) Tatsuma Ito	7–6^{(7–5)}, 1–6, 2–6
Loss	10–16	Mar 2012	Pingguo, China	Challenger	Hard	(Japan) Go Soeda	1–6, 6–3, 5–7
Win	11–16	Nov 2013	Geneva, Switzerland	Challenger	Hard	(Germany) Jan-Lennard Struff	6–4, 6–3
Loss	11–17	Feb 2014	Dallas, United States	Challenger	Hard (i)	(United States) Steve Johnson	4–6, 4–6
Loss	11–18	Sep 2014	İzmir, Turkey	Challenger	Hard	(Croatia) Borna Ćorić	1–6, 7–6^{(9–7)}, 4–6
Win	12–18	Oct 2015	Rennes, France	Challenger	Hard (i)	(Netherlands) Igor Sijsling	5–7, 7–5, 6–4
Win	13–18	Mar 2016	Guadalajara, Mexico	Challenger	Hard	(France) Stéphane Robert	5–7, 6–3, 7–6^{(7–5)}
Win	14–18	Apr 2016	Le Gosier, Guadeloupe	Challenger	Hard	(United States) Stefan Kozlov	6–2, 6–4
Win	15–18	Sep 2016	Istanbul, Turkey	Challenger	Hard	(Israel) Dudi Sela	1–6, 6–1, 6–0
Win	16–18	Sep 2017	Istanbul, Turkey	Challenger	Hard	(Italy) Matteo Berrettini	7–6^{(7–4)}, 0–6, 7–5
Win	17–18	Mar 2018	Qujing, China	Challenger	Hard	(Slovenia) Blaž Rola	7–6^{(7–5)}, 6–1

=== Doubles 21 (14–7) ===
Legend (doubles) ATP Challenger Tour (5–4) ITF Futures Tour (9–3)	Titles by surface Hard (7–4) Clay (7–2) Grass (0–1) Carpet (0–0)

Result	W–L	Date	Tournament	Tier	Surface	Partner	Opponents	Score
Win	1–0	Feb 2003	Nigeria F1, Benin City	Futures	Hard	(Tunisia) Walid Jallali	(South Africa) Andrew Anderson (South Africa) Willem-Petrus Meyer	3–6, 6–4 RET
Win	2–0	May 2003	Morocco F1, Agadir	Futures	Clay	(Tunisia) Walid Jallali	(France) Julien Couly (India) Sunil-Kumar Sipaeya	7–6^{(7–5)}, 6–2
Win	3–0	Feb 2004	France F3, Bressuire	Futures	Hard (i)	(Tunisia) Issam Jellali	(United States) Eric Butorac (Serbia and Montenegro) Petar Popović	6–1, 7–6^{(7–5)}
Win	4–0	Dec 2004	Tunisia F6, Mégrine	Futures	Hard	(Tunisia) Mohamed Haythem Abid	(Slovenia) Boštjan Ošabnik (Slovenia) Grega Žemlja	7–6^{(7–3)}, 6–3
Win	5–0	Jun 2005	Tunisia F1, Tunis	Futures	Clay	(Tunisia) Mohamed Haythem Abid	(United Kingdom) Colin Fleming (Germany) Alexander Satschko	6–4, 6–2
Loss	5–1	Jun 2005	Tunisia F2, Hammamet	Futures	Clay	(Tunisia) Mohamed Haythem Abid	(Tunisia) Wael Kilani (Tunisia) Fares Zaier	2–6, 6–4, 5–7
Win	6–1	Jun 2008	Tunisia F1, Sousse	Futures	Clay	(Tunisia) Walid Jallali	(Belgium) Frédéric de Fays (Belgium) Germain Gigounon	5–7, 7–6^{(7–4)}, [15–13]
Win	7–1	Sep 2008	France F15, Plaisir	Futures	Hard (i)	(Morocco) Rabie Chaki	(Monaco) Thomas Oger (France) Alexandre Penaud	6–4, 7–6^{(7–2)}
Win	8–1	Feb 2009	Morocco F2, Rabat	Futures	Clay	(Algeria) Lamine Ouahab	(Morocco) Omar Erramy (Morocco) Younès Rachidi	6–1, 6–3
Loss	8–2	Feb 2010	Morocco F2, Rabat	Futures	Clay	(Algeria) Lamine Ouahab	(Serbia) David Savić (United States) Denis Zivkovic	4–6, 1–6
Win	9–2	May 2011	Great Britain F7, Newcastle	Futures	Clay	(Spain) Carles Poch Gradin	(Spain) Pablo Martín-Adalia (United Kingdom) Morgan Phillips	6–1, 7–6^{(7–3)}
Loss	9–3	Jul 2011	Great Britain F8, Manchester	Futures	Grass	(France) Albano Olivetti	(United Kingdom) Chris Eaton (United Kingdom) Josh Goodall	4–6, 6–7^{(3–7)}
Win	10–3	Jul 2011	Penza, Russia	Challenger	Hard	(Spain) Arnau Brugués-Davi	(Ukraine) Sergei Bubka (Spain) Adrián Menéndez Maceiras	6–7^{(6–8)}, 6–2, [10–8]
Loss	10–4	Jul 2011	Astana, Kazakhstan	Challenger	Hard (i)	(Spain) Arnau Brugués-Davi	(Russia) Konstantin Kravchuk (Ukraine) Denys Molchanov	6–7^{(4–7)}, 7–6^{(7–1)}, [3–10]
Win	11–4	Sep 2013	Fergana, Uzbekistan	Challenger	Hard	(Uzbekistan) Farrukh Dustov	(Serbia) Ilija Bozoljac (Czech Republic) Roman Jebavý	6–3, 6–3
Loss	11–5	Sep 2014	İzmir, Turkey	Challenger	Hard	(Russia) Alexander Kudryavtsev	(United Kingdom) Ken Skupski (United Kingdom) Neal Skupski	1–6, 4–6
Loss	11–6	Sep 2015	İzmir, Turkey	Challenger	Hard	(Ukraine) Denys Molchanov	(India) Saketh Myneni (India) Divij Sharan	6–7^{(5–7)}, 6–4, [1–0] ret.
Win	12–6	Nov 2021	Knoxville, USA	Challenger	Hard (i)	(Slovenia) Blaž Rola	(Mexico) Hans Hach Verdugo (Mexico) Miguel Ángel Reyes-Varela	3-6, 6-3, [10-5]
Loss	12–7	Jun 2022	Orlando, USA	Challenger	Hard	(Japan) Kaichi Uchida	(South Korea) Chung Yun-seong (Greece) Michail Pervolarakis	7-6^{(7-5)}, 6-7^{(3-7)}, [14-16]
Win	13–7	Jul 2022	Cali, Colombia	Challenger	Clay	(Spain) Adrián Menéndez Maceiras	(United States) Keegan Smith (United States) Evan Zhu	7-5, 6-4
Win	14–7	Aug 2022	Toulouse, France	Challenger	Clay	(France) Maxime Janvier	(France) Théo Arribagé (France) Titouan Droguet	6–3, 7–6^{(7–5)}

== Performance timelines ==
Key
W	F	SF	QF	#R	RR	Q#	P#	DNQ	A	Z#	PO	G	S	B	NMS	NTI	P	NH

(W) winner; (F) finalist; (SF) semifinalist; (QF) quarterfinalist; (#R) rounds 4, 3, 2, 1; (RR) round-robin stage; (Q#) qualification round; (P#) preliminary round; (DNQ) did not qualify; (A) absent; (Z#) Davis/Fed Cup Zonal Group (with number indication) or (PO) play-off; (G) gold, (S) silver or (B) bronze Olympic/Paralympic medal; (NMS) not a Masters tournament; (NTI) not a Tier I tournament; (P) postponed; (NH) not held; (SR) strike rate (events won / competed); (W–L) win–loss record.
To avoid confusion and double counting, these charts are updated at the conclusion of a tournament or when the player's participation has ended.

=== Singles ===
Tournament	2011	2012	2013	2014	2015	2016	2017	2018	2019	SR	W–L
Grand Slam tournaments
Australian Open	A	Q1	A	Q1	3R	1R	3R	2R	1R	0 / 5	5–5
French Open	A	2R	Q2	Q2	1R	2R	1R	2R	1R	0 / 6	3–6
Wimbledon	A	2R	Q3	1R	1R	1R	1R	1R	1R	0 / 7	1–7
US Open	2R	1R	Q3	Q2	1R	1R	2R	1R	Q1	0 / 6	2–6
Win–loss	1–1	2–3	0–0	0–1	2–4	1–4	3–4	2–4	0–3	0 / 24	11–24

=== Doubles ===
Tournament	2012	2013	2014	2015	2016	2017	2018	2019	SR	W–L
Grand Slam tournaments
Australian Open	A	A	A	1R	A	1R	A	3R	0 / 3	2–3
French Open	A	A	A	A	1R	2R	A	A	0 / 2	1–2
Wimbledon	1R	A	A	2R	2R	1R	1R	1R	0 / 6	2–6
US Open	A	A	A	A	1R	2R	SF	2R	0 / 4	6–4
Win–loss	0–1	0–0	0–0	1–2	1–3	2–4	4–2	3–3	0 / 15	11–15

== Record against top-10 players ==
Jaziri's record against those who have been ranked in the top 10, with active players in boldface.

Player	Years	Matches	Record	Win%	Hard	Grass	Clay	Carpet	Last match
Number 1 ranked players									
(United Kingdom) **Andy Murray**	2017	1	0–1	0.0%	0–1	0–0	0–0	0–0	Lost (4–6, 1–6) at 2017 Dubai 1st Round
(Switzerland) **Roger Federer**	2013–2016	2	0–2	0.0%	0–1	0–1	0–0	0–0	Lost (3–6, 5–7) at 2016 Halle 2nd Round
(Serbia) **Novak Djokovic**	2016–2020	2	0–2	0.0%	0–2	0–0	0–0	0–0	Lost (1–6, 2–6) at 2020 Dubai 1st Round
Number 3 ranked players									
(Germany) **Alexander Zverev**	2016–2018	5	2–3	40.0%	1–2	0–0	1–1	0–0	Won (7–6^{(7–4)}, 2–6, 6–4) at 2018 Beijing 2nd Round
(Bulgaria) **Grigor Dimitrov**	2018	2	1–1	50.0%	1–0	0–0	0–1	0–0	Lost (5–7, 6–3, 6–7^{(8–10)}) at 2018 Barcelona 3rd Round
(Switzerland) **Stan Wawrinka**	2017	1	0–1	0.0%	0–1	0–0	0–0	0–0	Lost (3–6, 4–6) at 2017 Miami 3rd Round
(Spain) **David Ferrer**	2019	1	0–1	0.0%	0–0	0–0	0–1	0–0	Lost (6–7^{(13–15)}, 3–6) at 2019 Buenos Aires 1st Round
(Canada) **Milos Raonic**	2016–2018	2	0–2	0.0%	0–2	0–0	0–0	0–0	Lost (3–6, 5–7) at 2018 Cincinnati 2nd Round
(Austria) **Dominic Thiem**	2015	1	0–1	0.0%	0–0	0–1	0–0	0–0	Lost (3–6, 1–6) at 2015 Nottingham 2nd Round
(Croatia) **Marin Čilić**	2014–2018	2	1–1	50.0%	0–1	0–0	1–0	0–0	Won (6–4, 6–2) at 2018 Istanbul 2nd Round
Number 4 ranked players									
(Czech Republic) **Tomáš Berdych**	2016	1	0–1	0.0%	0–0	0–0	0–1	0–0	Lost (1–6, 6–2, 2–6, 4–6) at **2016 Roland Garros 2nd Round**
Number 5 ranked players									
(South Africa) **Kevin Anderson**	2012–2017	6	1–5	16.6%	1–3	0–0	0–2	0–0	Lost (4–6, 1–6) at 2017 Washington 2nd Round
(Spain) **Tommy Robredo**	2016	1	0–1	0.0%	0–1	0–0	0–0	0–0	Lost (5–7, 6–3, 6–4, 6–7^{(7–9)}, 6–8) at **2016 Australian Open 1st Round**
(Greece) **Stefanos Tsitsipas**	2018	2	1–1	50.0%	1–0	0–1	0–0	0–0	Lost (6–4, 6–7^{(6–8)}, 2–6) at 2018 's-Hertogenbosch 2nd Round
(France) **Jo-Wilfried Tsonga**	2012–2021	3	1–2	33.3%	1–2	0–0	0–0	0–0	Won (3–3, retired) at 2021 Dubai 1st Round
Number 6 ranked players									
(France) **Gilles Simon**	2014–2019	5	0–5	0.0%	0–4	0–0	0–1	0–0	Lost (3–6, 7–6^{(8–6)}, 4–6) at 2019 Indian Wells 2nd Round
(France) **Gaël Monfils**	2014	1	0–1	0.0%	0–0	0–1	0–0	0–0	Lost (6–7^{(5–7)}, 5–7, 4–6) at **2014 Wimbledon 1st Round**
Number 7 ranked players									
(France) **Richard Gasquet**	2017–2018	2	0–2	0.0%	0–1	0–0	0–1	0–0	Lost (2–6, 6–3, 3–6, 0–6) at **2018 Roland Garros 2nd Round**
(United States) Mardy Fish	2011	1	0–1	0.0%	0–1	0–0	0–0	0–0	Lost (2–6, 2–6, 4–6) at **2011 US Open 2nd Round**
(Spain) **Fernando Verdasco**	2016–2018	2	1–1	50.0%	1–1	0–0	0–0	0–0	Won (6–3, 7–5) at 2018 Paris 2nd Round
(Belgium) **David Goffin**	2016–2019	2	1–1	50.0%	1–0	0–0	0–1	0–0	Lost (6–4, 6–7^{(4–7)}, 2–6) at 2019 Estoril Quarterfinal
Number 8 ranked players									
(United States) **John Isner**	2012–2017	4	0–4	0.0%	0–3	0–1	0–0	0–0	Lost (2–6, 3–6) at 2017 Beijing 1st Round
(Czech Republic) Radek Štěpánek	2014	1	1–0	100.0%	1–0	0–0	0–0	0–0	Won (2–6, 7–6^{(7–3)}, 6–1) at 2014 Washington 2nd Round
(United States) **Jack Sock**	2016–2018	3	0–3	0.0%	0–3	0–0	0–0	0–0	Lost (0–6, 4–6) at 2018 Paris 3rd Round
(Serbia) **Janko Tipsarević**	2016	1	0–1	0.0%	0–1	0–0	0–0	0–0	Lost (6–7^{(6–8)}, 2–6) at 2016 Shenzhen Quarterfinal
(Cyprus) Marcos Baghdatis	2018	1	1–0	100.0%	1–0	0–0	0–0	0–0	Won (7–6^{(9–7)}, 1–6, 6–2) at 2018 Chengdu 1st Round
(Russia) Mikhail Youzhny	2016–2018	2	2–0	100.0%	1–0	0–0	1–0	0–0	Won (2–6, 6–2, 6–2, 3–6, 6–2) at **2018 Roland Garros 1st Round**
Number 9 ranked players									
(Spain) **Roberto Bautista Agut**	2018	1	0–1	0.0%	0–1	0–0	0–0	0–0	Lost (3–6, 4–6) at 2018 Dubai Semifinal
(Italy) **Fabio Fognini**	2017	1	0–1	0.0%	0–1	0–0	0–0	0–0	Lost (5–7, 1–6) at 2017 Stockholm 1st Round
Number 10 ranked players									
(Spain) **Pablo Carreño Busta**	2018	1	0–1	0.0%	0–1	0–0	0–0	0–0	Lost (5–7, 2–6, 2–6) at **2018 US Open 1st Round**
(France) **Lucas Pouille**	2017	1	0–1	0.0%	0–0	0–1	0–0	0–0	Lost (7–6^{(7–5)}, 4–6, 4–6, 6–7^{(2–7)}) at **2017 Wimbledon 1st Round**
**Total**	2011–2021	61	13–48	20.0%	10–33 (21.4%)	0–6 (0.0%)	3–9 (25.0%)	0–0 (0.0%)	:* Statistics correct as of 14 March 2021.

== Wins over top 10 players ==
- He has a 3–13 (.188) record against players who were, at the time the match was played, ranked in the top 10.

Season	2003–2017	2018	2019	2020	2021	2021	2022	2023	Total
Wins	0	3	0	0	0	0	0	0	3

#	Player	Rank	Event	Surface	Rd	Score	Jaziri Rank
2018
1.	(Bulgaria) Grigor Dimitrov	4	Dubai Tennis Championships, United Arab Emirates	Hard	1R	4–6, 7–5, 6–4	117
2.	(Croatia) Marin Čilić	4	Istanbul Open, Turkey	Clay	2R	6–4, 6–2	78
3.	(Germany) Alexander Zverev	5	Beijing, China	Hard	2R	7–6^{(7–4)}, 2–6, 6–4	61

== See also ==
- Kareem Al Allaf, Davis Cup tennis player for Syria banned by the Syrian tennis federation after he played a match against an Israeli.
