= Alexander Sadecky =

Swiss tennis player

- Country (sports): Switzerland
- Born: 7 June 1987 (age 39) Zürich, Switzerland
- Height: 1.93 m (6 ft 4 in)
- Turned pro: 2006
- Plays: Left-handed
- Prize money: US$100,501

Singles
- Career record: 1–2
- Career titles: 0
- Highest ranking: No. 313 (2 November 2009)

Doubles
- Career record: 0–5
- Career titles: 0
- Highest ranking: No. 317 (5 January 2009)

Alexander Sadecky (Czech: Sádecký; born 6 July 1987 in Zürich) is a professional tennis player from Switzerland who entered professional play in 2006. Of Czech ancestry, his coach is Dirk de Beus (since 2008). He has regularly competed on the Challenger and Futures tour circuit. He has reached the final of seven Futures tournaments; in five of these he was victorious.

He played only three singles matches in the ATP World Tour. It was in his country, Switzerland (2010 Allianz Suisse Open Gstaad), where he reached the second round (by defeating compatriot Yann Marti). Sadecky was eliminated by first seed Mikhail Youzhny. In the same tournament in 2011 he played in first round against Peter Luczak, he lost the game 6–3, 3–6, 6–7.
