= Sandro Ehrat =

Swiss tennis player (born 1991)

- Full name: Sandro Ehrat
- Country (sports): Switzerland
- Born: 18 April 1991 (age 34) Schaffhausen, Switzerland
- Height: 1.80 m (5 ft 11 in)
- Plays: Right-handed (two-handed backhand)
- Coach: Juerg Ehrat
- Prize money: $147,448

Singles
- Career record: 1–5 (at ATP Tour level, Grand Slam level, and in Davis Cup)
- Career titles: 0
- Highest ranking: No. 286 (9 September 2019)

Doubles
- Career record: 0–7 (at ATP Tour level, Grand Slam level, and in Davis Cup)
- Career titles: 0
- Highest ranking: No. 467 (12 July 2021)

Sandro Ehrat (born 18 April 1991) is a Swiss tennis player. Ehrat has a career high ATP singles ranking of No. 286 achieved on 9 September 2019 and a career high ATP doubles ranking of No. 467 achieved on 12 July 2021. Ehrat made his ATP main draw debut at the 2010 MercedesCup, partnering Raphael Hemmeler in doubles, but they lost in the first round.

== ATP Challengers and ITF Futures/World Tennis Tour Finals ==
=== Singles: 25 (11–14) ===
Legend (singles) ATP Challenger Tour (0–0) ITF Futures/World Tennis Tour (11–14)	Titles by surface Hard (5–4) Clay (6–7) Grass (0–0) Carpet (0–3)

Result	W–L	Date	Tournament	Tier	Surface	Opponent	Score
Loss	0–1	Mar 2010	Switzerland F2, Wetzikon	Futures	Carpet (i)	(Netherlands) Matwé Middelkoop	3–6, 4–6
Loss	0–2	Mar 2011	Switzerland F1, Fällanden	Futures	Carpet (i)	(Germany) Holger Fischer	6–7^{(7–9)}, 2–6
Win	1–2	Sep 2011	Sweden F4, Uppsala	Futures	Hard (i)	(Sweden) Carl Bergman	7–6^{(7–1)}, 7–5
Loss	1–3	Feb 2012	Ukraine F1, Cherkasy	Futures	Hard (i)	(Ukraine) Artem Smirnov	1–6, 2–6
Win	2–3	May 2012	Bulgaria F3, Sofia	Futures	Clay	(Germany) Moritz Baumann	6–3, 6–3
Loss	2–4	Jul 2012	Italy F16, Bolzano	Futures	Clay	(Argentina) Nicolás Pastor	4–6, 3–6
Loss	2–5	Aug 2012	Germany F15, Überlingen	Futures	Clay	(Germany) Bastian Knittel	6–7^{(5–7)}, 1–6
Loss	2–6	Sep 2012	Italy F25, Trieste	Futures	Clay	(Slovakia) Jozef Kovalík	6–7^{(2–7)}, 4–6
Loss	2–7	Sep 2012	France F17, Plaisir	Futures	Hard (i)	(France) Marc Gicquel	2–6, 3–6
Loss	2–8	Oct 2012	Germany F18, Leimen	Futures	Hard (i)	(Germany) Stefan Seifert	3–6, 6–3, 2–6
Win	3–8	Apr 2013	Italy F5, Vicenza	Futures	Clay	(Argentina) Andrés Molteni	6–3, 7–5
Win	4–8	Sep 2013	France F15, Mulhouse	Futures	Hard (i)	(Belgium) Maxime Authom	7–6^{(7–5)}, 6–3
Win	5–8	Oct 2013	Germany F18, Leimen	Futures	Hard (i)	(Italy) Erik Crepaldi	6–4, 6–3
Loss	5–9	May 2015	Turkey F21, Antalya	Futures	Hard	(Venezuela) Ricardo Rodríguez	5–7, 6–4, 4–6
Loss	5–10	Aug 2015	Germany F12, Karlsruhe	Futures	Clay	(Spain) Javier Martí	1–6, 2–6
Loss	5–11	Jul 2016	Belgium F7, Duinbergen	Futures	Clay	(France) Maxime Chazal	5–7, 6–2, 2–6
Loss	5–12	Sep 2018	Switzerland F5, Schlieren	Futures	Clay	(Germany) Louis Wessels	3–6, 4–6
Win	6–12	Sep 2018	Italy F29, Santa Margherita Di Pula	Futures	Clay	(Italy) Giovanni Fonio	7–5, 6–4
Win	7–12	Jan 2019	M15 Manacor, Spain	World Tennis Tour	Clay	(Sweden) Markus Eriksson	6–4, 6–2
Loss	7–13	Jan 2019	M15 Palma Nova, Spain	World Tennis Tour	Clay	(Argentina) Francisco Cerúndolo	6–2, 2–6, 3–6
Loss	7–14	Feb 2019	M25 Oberentfelden, Switzerland	World Tennis Tour	Carpet (i)	(France) Evan Furness	6–4, 5–7, 4–6
Win	8–14	Feb 2019	M15 Faro, Portugal	World Tennis Tour	Hard	(Australia) Jacob Grills	6–2, 6–2
Win	9–14	Mar 2019	M15 Loulé, Portugal	World Tennis Tour	Hard	(Spain) Álvaro López San Martín	6–2, 6–4
Win	10–14	Jul 2019	M15 Telfs, Austria	World Tennis Tour	Clay	(Austria) Alexander Erler	6–4, 7–6^{(8-6)}, 6–3
Win	11–14	Aug 2020	M15 Caslano, Switzerland	World Tennis Tour	Clay	(Italy) Alessandro Bega	6–4, 6–2

=== Doubles 9 (4–5) ===
Legend (doubles) ATP Challenger Tour (0–0) ITF Futures Tour (4–5)	Titles by surface Hard (0–1) Clay (3–3) Grass (0–0) Carpet (1–1)

Result	W–L	Date	Tournament	Tier	Surface	Partner	Opponents	Score
Win	1–0	Oct 2011	Germany F15, Hambach	Futures	Carpet (i)	(Croatia) Ante Pavić	(Germany) Marko Lenz (Germany) George von Massow	6–4, 6–2
Loss	1–1	Mar 2012	Switzerland F2, Vaduz	Futures	Carpet (i)	(Germany) Matthias Kolbe	(Germany) Gero Kretschmer (Germany) Jakob Sude	5–7, 6–7^{(6–8)}
Win	2–1	May 2012	Italy F8, Bergamo	Futures	Clay	(Germany) Moritz Baumann	(Italy) Claudio Grassi (Italy) Matteo Volante	6–2, 6–2
Win	3–1	May 2012	Bulgaria F3, Sofia	Futures	Clay	(Germany) Moritz Baumann	(Bulgaria) Dinko Halachev (Bulgaria) Petar Trendafilov	6–1, 6–1
Loss	3–2	Aug 2012	Germany F15, Überlingen	Futures	Clay	(Germany) Florian Fallert	(Philippines) Ruben Gonzales (Australia) Chris Letcher	6–7^{(6–8)}, 4–6
Loss	3–3	May 2013	Italy F8, Santa Margherita Di Pula	Futures	Clay	(Switzerland) Michael Lammer	(Chile) Guillermo Hormazábal (Argentina) Andrés Molteni	2–6, 1–6
Win	4–3	Sep 2018	Italy F29, Santa Margherita Di Pula	Futures	Clay	(Germany) Florian Fallert	(Italy) Davide Galoppini (Brazil) Bruno Sant'Anna	7–6^{(7–3)}, 6–3
Loss	4–4	Jan 2019	M15 Spain, Manacor	ITF World Tennis Tour	Clay	(Switzerland) Vullnet Tashi	(Switzerland) Adrian Bodmer (Germany) Jakob Sude	6–4 3–6 [9–11]
Loss	4–5	Jan 2020	M25 USA, Los Angeles	ITF World Tennis Tour	Hard	(United States) Brandon Holt	(United States) Riley Smith (Israel) Daniel Cukierman	6–7^{(4–7)}, 6–7^{(5–7)}
