= Geneva Open Challenger =

- 2014 Geneva Open Challenger

Defunct tennis tournament
- Location: Geneva, Switzerland
- Venue: Sport Center of the Queue d'Arve
- Category: ATP Challenger Series
- Surface: Hard / GreenSet / Indoors
- Draw: 32S/16Q/16D
- Prize money: €100,000
- Website: Website

The Geneva Open Challenger, also known as IPP Trophy, was a tennis tournament held in Geneva, Switzerland from 1988 to 2014. The event was part of the ATP Challenger Tour. Previously played on outdoor clay courts, it was subsequently played indoors on hard GreenSet courts since 2011, at Sport Center of the Queue d'Arve. Originally, it was held at the Drizia-Miremont Tennis Club.

The Association of Tennis Professionals (ATP) awarded the Jim McManus Challenger Award to the tournament in 2013. This award honors the best challenger tournament in the world.

== Past finals ==
=== Singles ===
| Year | Champion | Runner-up | Score |
|---|---|---|---|
| 2014 | (Cyprus) Márcos Baghdatís | (Poland) Michał Przysiężny | 6–1, 4–6, 6–3 |
| 2013 | (Tunisia) Malek Jaziri | (Germany) Jan-Lennard Struff | 6–4, 6–3 |
| 2012 | (France) Marc Gicquel | (Germany) Matthias Bachinger | 3–6, 6–3, 6–4 |
| 2011 | (Tunisia) Malek Jaziri | (Germany) Mischa Zverev | 4–6, 6–3, 6–3 |
| 2010 | (Bulgaria) Grigor Dimitrov | (Spain) Pablo Andújar | 6–2, 4–6, 6–4 |
| 2009 | (Germany) Dominik Meffert | (Monaco) Benjamin Balleret | 6–3, 6–1 |
| 2008 | (Belgium) Kristof Vliegen | (Kazakhstan) Yuri Schukin | 6–2, 6–1 |
| 2007 | (Russia) Yuri Schukin | (Netherlands) Jesse Huta Galung | 6–3, 6–2 |
| 2006 | (France) Jérôme Haehnel | (Australia) Chris Guccione | 7–6, 4–6, 6–3 |
| 2005 | (Austria) Werner Eschauer | (Argentina) Damián Patriarca | 6–3, 6–1 |
| 2004 | (Switzerland) Stanislas Wawrinka | (Belgium) Christophe Rochus | 4–6, 6–4, RET. |
| 2003 | (Switzerland) Stanislas Wawrinka | (Spain) Emilio Benfele Álvarez | 6–1, 7–5 |
| 2002 | (Belgium) Kristof Vliegen | (Spain) Galo Blanco | 6–2, 6–2 |
| 2001 | (Netherlands) Dennis van Scheppingen | (Croatia) Željko Krajan | 6–3, 6–2 |
| 2000 | (France) Nicolas Thomann | (Spain) Álex Calatrava | 6–4, 6–7, 6–1 |
| 1999 | (Switzerland) Michel Kratochvil | (Bulgaria) Orlin Stanoytchev | 6–0, 6–1 |
| 1998 | (Spain) Joan Albert Viloca | (Morocco) Younes El Aynaoui | 6–3, 6–4 |
| 1997 | (Italy) Andrea Gaudenzi | (Spain) Alberto Martín | 6–2, 6–1 |
| 1996 | (Argentina) Marcelo Charpentier | (Germany) Oliver Gross | 6–2, 3–1, RET. |
| 1995 | (Morocco) Younes El Aynaoui | (Morocco) Karim Alami | 6–1, 6–4 |
| 1994 | (Spain) José Francisco Altur | (Argentina) Martín Rodríguez | 7–6, 6–4 |
| 1993 | (Argentina) Gabriel Markus | (Slovakia) Karol Kučera | 3–6, 6–2, 7–5 |
| 1992 | (Chile) Sergio Cortés | (Belgium) Filip Dewulf | 6–7, 6–2, 6–4 |
| 1991 | (Spain) Marcos Aurelio Górriz | (Romania) Dinu Pescariu | 6–3, 6–2 |
| 1990 | (Argentina) Roberto Argüello | (Argentina) Daniel Orsanic | 6–3, 6–0 |
| 1989 | (Israel) Gilad Bloom | (France) Arnaud Boetsch | 6–4, 6–1 |
| 1988 | (Argentina) Gustavo Giussani | (Italy) Simone Colombo | 6–4, 2–6, 6–3 |

=== Doubles ===
| Year | Champion | Runner-up | Score |
|---|---|---|---|
| 2014 | (Sweden) Johan Brunström (United States) Nicholas Monroe | (Austria) Oliver Marach (Austria) Philipp Oswald | 5–7, 7–5, 10-6 |
| 2013 | (Austria) Oliver Marach (Romania) Florin Mergea | (Czech Republic) František Čermák (Austria) Philipp Oswald | 6–4, 6–3 |
| 2012 | (Sweden) Johan Brunström (South Africa) Raven Klaasen | (Germany) Philipp Marx (Romania) Florin Mergea | 7–6^{(7–2)}, 6–7^{(5–7)}, [10–5] |
| 2011 | (Russia) Igor Andreev (Russia) Evgeny Donskoy | (United States) James Cerretani (Canada) Adil Shamasdin | 7–6^{(7–1)}, 7–6^{(7–2)} |
| 2010 | (Germany) Gero Kretschmer (Germany) Alex Satschko | (Austria) Philipp Oswald (Austria) Martin Slanar | 6–3, 4–6, [11–9] |
| 2009 | (Argentina) Diego Álvarez (Argentina) Juan-Martín Aranguren | (Finland) Henri Laaksonen (Austria) Philipp Oswald | 6–4, 4–6, [10–2] |
| 2008 | (Austria) Daniel Köllerer (Germany) Frank Moser | (Australia) Rameez Junaid (Germany) Philipp Marx | 7–6, 3–6, [10–8] |
| 2007 | (Argentina) Sebastián Decoud (Russia) Yuri Schukin | (United States) James Cerretani (France) Olivier Charroin | 6–3, 6–7, [10–4] |
| 2006 | (Czech Republic) Michal Navrátil (Russia) Yuri Schukin | (Greece) Konstantinos Economidis (Croatia) Lovro Zovko | 1–6, 6–2, [10–6] |
| 2005 | (Spain) Rubén Ramírez Hidalgo (Spain) Santiago Ventura | (Switzerland) Stéphane Bohli (Switzerland) Roman Valent | 6–3, 7–5 |
| 2004 | (Czech Republic) Tomáš Cibulec (Czech Republic) David Škoch | (Austria) Werner Eschauer (Austria) Herbert Wiltschnig | 6–2, 6–4 |
| 2003 | (Spain) Álex López Morón (Argentina) Andrés Schneiter | (Spain) Emilio Benfele Álvarez (Germany) Philipp Petzschner | 6–4, 5–7, 7–6 |
| 2002 | (Romania) Victor Hănescu (Argentina) Leonardo Olguín | (Argentina) Andrés Schneiter (Bulgaria) Orlin Stanoytchev | 1–6, 6–4, 6–4 |
| 2001 | (Argentina) Diego del Río (Bulgaria) Orlin Stanoytchev | (Spain) Feliciano López (Spain) Francisco Roig | 2–6, 7–6, 7–6 |
| 2000 | (Argentina) Diego del Río (Argentina) Edgardo Massa | (Switzerland) Yves Allegro (France) Julien Cuaz | 7–5, 7–6 |
| 1999 | (Spain) Emilio Benfele Álvarez (Spain) Álex López Morón | (Australia) Paul Hanley (Australia) Nathan Healey | 7–5, 6–3 |
| 1998 | (Sweden) Rikard Bergh (Germany) Jens Knippschild | (Czech Republic) Michal Tabara (Czech Republic) Radomír Vašek | 6–2, 3–6, 6–4 |
| 1997 | (Argentina) Diego del Río (Argentina) Mariano Puerta | (France) Guillaume Marx (France) Olivier Morel | 6–3, 6–4 |
| 1996 | (Germany) Patrick Baur (Germany) Jens Knippschild | (Switzerland) George Bastl (Switzerland) Michel Kratochvil | 6–1, 6–1 |
| 1995 | (South Africa) Clinton Ferreira (Hungary) Gábor Köves | (Switzerland) Stéphane Manai (Switzerland) Patrick Mohr | 6–4, 6–2 |
| 1994 | (Argentina) Luis Lobo (Argentina) Daniel Orsanic | (United States) Brett Dickinson (New Zealand) Glenn Wilson | 1–6, 7–6, 6–4 |
| 1993 | (Sweden) Jan Apell (Sweden) Nicklas Utgren | (Switzerland) Claudio Mezzadri (Argentina) Christian Miniussi | 6–4, 6–2 |
| 1992 | (Belgium) Filip Dewulf (Belgium) Tom Vanhoudt | (Venezuela) Alfonso González-Mora (Chile) Marcelo Rebolledo | 6–3, 6–2 |
| 1991 | (Soviet Union) Vladimer Gabrichidze (Czech Republic) Martin Střelba | (Argentina) Roberto Argüello (Argentina) Christian Miniussi | 1–6, 6–3, 6–4 |
| 1990 | (Sweden) Henrik Holm (Sweden) Nils Holm | (Czech Republic) Branislav Stanković (Czech Republic) Richard Vogel | 3–6, 7–5, 7–6 |
| 1989 | (Germany) Peter Ballauff (Italy) Ugo Pigato | (France) Arnaud Boetsch (Czech Republic) Slava Doseděl | 6–4, 6–3 |
| 1988 | (Italy) Nevio Devide (Switzerland) Stefano Mezzadri | (Romania) Mihnea-Ion Năstase (India) Srinivasan Vasudevan | 7–6, 4–6, 6–4 |
