= 2011 Intersport Heilbronn Open – Doubles =

Doubles
- 2011 Intersport Heilbronn Open

Final
- Champions: (United Kingdom) Jamie Delgado (United Kingdom) Jonathan Marray
- Runners-up: (Germany) Frank Moser (Czech Republic) David Škoch
- Score: 6–1, 6–4

Events
Singles	Doubles
← 2010 ·	Intersport Heilbronn Open	· 2012 →

Sanchai Ratiwatana and Sonchat Ratiwatana were the defending champions but decided not to participate.
Jamie Delgado and Jonathan Marray won this tournament by defeating Frank Moser and David Škoch 6–1, 6–4 in the final.

== Seeds ==
1. (United States) James Cerretani / (Canada) Adil Shamasdin (semifinals)
2. (Serbia) Ilija Bozoljac / (Serbia) Dušan Vemić (semifinals)
3. (Germany) Frank Moser / (Czech Republic) David Škoch (final)
4. (Germany) Philipp Marx / (Germany) Dominik Meffert (first round)

== Draw ==
=== Key ===
- Q = Qualifier
- WC = Wild card
- LL = Lucky loser
- Alt = Alternate
- SE = Special exempt
- PR = Protected ranking
- ITF = ITF entry
- JE = Junior exempt
- w/o = Walkover
- r = Retired
- d = Defaulted
- SR = Special ranking

=== Draw ===
First round
1	(United States) J Cerretani (Canada) A Shamasdin	7	6
WC	(Germany) Jan-Frederik Brunken (Germany) Jan-Lennard Struff	5	2
(Netherlands) J Huta Galung (Netherlands) I Sijsling	4	2
(Belgium) R Bemelmans (Italy) A Motti	6	6
4	(Germany) P Marx (Germany) D Meffert	3	6^{5}
(United Kingdom) J Delgado (United Kingdom) J Marray	6	7
(Germany) M Emmrich (Poland) M Kowalczyk	6	4	[8]
WC	(Germany) B Knittel (Germany) S Rieschick	3	6	[10]
(United States) B Battistone (Sweden) A Siljeström	4	7	[10]
(Switzerland) Y Allegro (Germany) A Beck	6	6^{5}	[8]
(Germany) M Bachinger (Germany) D Gremelmayr	1	5
3	(Germany) F Moser (Czech Republic) D Škoch	6	7
(Switzerland) S Bohli (Switzerland) M Chiudinelli	w/o
WC	(Germany) Florian Fallert (Germany) N Langer
(Poland) T Bednarek (Slovakia) M Kližan	3	4
2	(Serbia) I Bozoljac (Serbia) D Vemić	6	6

Quarterfinals
1	(United States) J Cerretani (Canada) A Shamasdin	3	6	[11]
(Belgium) R Bemelmans (Italy) A Motti	6	3	[9]
(United Kingdom) J Delgado (United Kingdom) J Marray	7	6
WC	(Germany) B Knittel (Germany) S Rieschick	6^{3}	1
(United States) B Battistone (Sweden) A Siljeström	4	6	[5]
3	(Germany) F Moser (Czech Republic) D Škoch	6	4	[10]
WC	(Germany) Florian Fallert (Germany) N Langer	3	4
2	(Serbia) I Bozoljac (Serbia) D Vemić	6	6

Semifinals
1	(United States) J Cerretani (Canada) A Shamasdin	3	4
(United Kingdom) J Delgado (United Kingdom) J Marray	6	6
3	(Germany) F Moser (Czech Republic) D Škoch	7	7
2	(Serbia) I Bozoljac (Serbia) D Vemić	6^{5}	5

Final
(United Kingdom) J Delgado (United Kingdom) J Marray	6	6
3	(Germany) F Moser (Czech Republic) D Škoch	1	4
