= 2012 Intersport Heilbronn Open – Doubles =

Doubles
- 2012 Intersport Heilbronn Open

Final
- Champions: (Sweden) Johan Brunström (Denmark) Frederik Nielsen
- Runners-up: (Philippines) Treat Conrad Huey (United Kingdom) Dominic Inglot
- Score: 6–3, 3–6, [10–6]

Events
Singles	Doubles
← 2011 ·	Intersport Heilbronn Open	· 2013 →

Jamie Delgado and Jonathan Marray were the defending champions, but both players chose not to participate.

Johan Brunström and Frederik Nielsen won the title, defeating Treat Conrad Huey and Dominic Inglot in the final 6–3, 3–6, [10–6].

== Seeds ==
1. (United States) James Cerretani / (Germany) Frank Moser (first round)
2. (Austria) Julian Knowle / (Germany) Michael Kohlmann (quarterfinals)
3. (Czech Republic) Lukáš Dlouhý / (Germany) Alexander Waske (semifinals)
4. (Germany) Martin Emmrich / (Sweden) Andreas Siljeström (semifinals)

== Draw ==
=== Key ===
- Q = Qualifier
- WC = Wild card
- LL = Lucky loser
- Alt = Alternate
- SE = Special exempt
- PR = Protected ranking
- ITF = ITF entry
- JE = Junior exempt
- w/o = Walkover
- r = Retired
- d = Defaulted
- SR = Special ranking

=== Draw ===
First round
1	(United States) J Cerretani (Germany) F Moser	6^{5}	7^{8}	[4]
WC	(Thailand) Sa Ratiwatana (Thailand) So Ratiwatana	7^{7}	6^{6}	[10]
(Sweden) J Brunström (Denmark) F Nielsen	6	6
(Slovakia) K Beck (Slovakia) I Zelenay	3	4
4	(Germany) M Emmrich (Sweden) A Siljeström	6	7^{7}
WC	(France) P-H Herbert (Germany) K Krawietz	2	6^{5}
(Germany) D Brown (Croatia) L Zovko	7^{7}	7^{7}
(United States) M Russell (South Africa) I van der Merwe	6^{3}	6^{5}
WC	(Germany) S Greul (Germany) B Knittel	4	6	[9]
(France) O Charroin (Spain) A Menéndez	6	2	[11]
(United Kingdom) J Delgado (United Kingdom) J Marray	4	3
3	(Czech Republic) L Dlouhý (Germany) A Waske	6	6
Alt	(Netherlands) S Groen (Germany) M Zelch	0	2
(Philippines) TC Huey (United Kingdom) D Inglot	6	6
(Germany) M Berrer (Australia) J Kerr	1	4
2	(Austria) J Knowle (Germany) M Kohlmann	6	6

Quarterfinals
WC	(Thailand) Sa Ratiwatana (Thailand) So Ratiwatana	4	5
(Sweden) J Brunström (Denmark) F Nielsen	6	7
4	(Germany) M Emmrich (Sweden) A Siljeström	6	7
(Germany) D Brown (Croatia) L Zovko	4	5
(France) O Charroin (Spain) A Menéndez	4	1
3	(Czech Republic) L Dlouhý (Germany) A Waske	6	6
(Philippines) TC Huey (United Kingdom) D Inglot	6	6^{2}	[16]
2	(Austria) J Knowle (Germany) M Kohlmann	4	7^{7}	[14]

Semifinals
(Sweden) J Brunström (Denmark) F Nielsen	6	6
4	(Germany) M Emmrich (Sweden) A Siljeström	2	4
3	(Czech Republic) L Dlouhý (Germany) A Waske	6^{5}	4
(Philippines) TC Huey (United Kingdom) D Inglot	7^{7}	6

Final
(Sweden) J Brunström (Denmark) F Nielsen	6	3	[10]
(Philippines) TC Huey (United Kingdom) D Inglot	3	6	[6]
