= 2012 Intersport Heilbronn Open – Singles =

Tennis contest held in Heilbronn

Singles
- 2012 Intersport Heilbronn Open

Final
- Champion: (Germany) Björn Phau
- Runner-up: (Belgium) Ruben Bemelmans
- Score: 6–7^{(4–7)}, 6–3, 6–4

Events
Singles	Doubles
← 2011 ·	Intersport Heilbronn Open	· 2013 →

Björn Phau won the title, defeating Ruben Bemelmans in the final 6–7^{(4–7)}, 6–3, 6–4.

Defending champion Bastian Knittel lost in the second round to Ruben Bemelmans.

== Seeds ==
1. (Luxembourg) Gilles Müller (first round)
2. (Germany) Cedrik-Marcel Stebe (semifinals)
3. (Germany) Matthias Bachinger (second round)
4. (United States) Michael Russell (second round)
5. (Slovakia) Karol Beck (second round)
6. (Germany) Michael Berrer (quarterfinals)
7. (Slovenia) Grega Žemlja (first round)
8. (Germany) Daniel Brands (first round)

== Draw ==
=== Key ===
- Q = Qualifier
- WC = Wild card
- LL = Lucky loser
- Alt = Alternate
- ITF = ITF entry
- PR = Protected ranking
- SR = Special ranking
- SE = Special exempt
- JE = Junior exempt
- JR = Junior Accelerator Programme entrant
- CO = College Accelerator Programme entrant
- NG = Next Gen Accelerator Program entrant
- w/o = Walkover
- r = Retired
- d = Defaulted

=== Finals ===
Semifinals
(Germany) Björn Phau	3	6	7^{7}
Q	(Germany) Dominik Meffert	6	3	6^{3}
Q	(Belgium) Ruben Bemelmans	7	6
2	(Germany) Cedrik-Marcel Stebe	5	3

Final
(Germany) Björn Phau	6^{4}	6	6
Q	(Belgium) Ruben Bemelmans	7^{7}	3	4

=== Top half ===
First round
1/WC	(Luxembourg) G Müller	6^{6}	3
(Slovakia) M Kližan	7^{8}	6
(South Africa) I van der Merwe	2	2
Q	(Germany) M Zverev	6	6
(Turkey) M İlhan	6^{6}	6	6
(Czech Republic) J Hájek	7^{8}	2	2
(Germany) B Phau	6	6
7	(Slovenia) G Žemlja	3	4
4	(United States) M Russell	6	7
Q	(Poland) M Gawron	2	5
(Kazakhstan) A Golubev	4	5
Q	(Germany) D Meffert	6	7
(Spain) D Muñoz-de la Nava	3	3
(South Africa) R de Voest	6	6
(Spain) P Carreño-Busta	3	4
5	(Slovakia) K Beck	6	6

Second round
(Slovakia) M Kližan	6	7^{10}
Q	(Germany) M Zverev	3	6^{8}
(Turkey) M İlhan	6	3	2
(Germany) B Phau	3	6	6
4	(United States) M Russell	2	6	4
Q	(Germany) D Meffert	6	2	6
(South Africa) R de Voest	6	6
5	(Slovakia) K Beck	4	0

Quarterfinals
(Slovakia) M Kližan	0	3
(Germany) B Phau	6	6
Q	(Germany) D Meffert	6	6
(South Africa) R de Voest	3	4

Semifinals
(Germany) B Phau	3	6	7^{7}
Q	(Germany) D Meffert	6	3	6^{3}

=== Bottom half ===
First round
8	(Germany) D Brands	5	1
WC	(Germany) B Knittel	7	6
(Russia) E Donskoy	2	2
Q	(Belgium) R Bemelmans	6	6
(Austria) A Haider-Maurer	5	6^{2}
(Canada) V Pospisil	7	7^{7}
(Ukraine) S Bubka	4	6	4
3	(Germany) M Bachinger	6	4	6
6	(Germany) M Berrer	6	3	6
(Russia) T Gabashvili	2	6	1
(Canada) F Dancevic	6	6
WC	(Germany) K Krawietz	3	3
(France) A Gensse	4	5
WC	(Germany) B Becker	6	7
(Germany) S Greul	4	4
2	(Germany) C-M Stebe	6	6

Second round
WC	(Germany) B Knittel	6^{1}	1
Q	(Belgium) R Bemelmans	7^{7}	6
(Canada) V Pospisil	6	4	7^{8}
3	(Germany) M Bachinger	4	6	6^{6}
6	(Germany) M Berrer	6	6
(Canada) F Dancevic	4	4
WC	(Germany) B Becker	6	6^{5}	5^{r}
2	(Germany) C-M Stebe	3	7^{7}	6

Quarterfinals
Q	(Belgium) R Bemelmans	7^{7}	6
(Canada) V Pospisil	6^{1}	3
6	(Germany) M Berrer	1	4
2	(Germany) C-M Stebe	6	6

Semifinals
Q	(Belgium) R Bemelmans	7	6
2	(Germany) C-M Stebe	5	3
