= 2009 Intersport Heilbronn Open – Doubles =

Doubles
- 2009 Intersport Heilbronn Open

Final
- Champions: (Slovakia) Karol Beck (Czech Republic) Jaroslav Levinský
- Runners-up: (Germany) Benedikt Dorsch (Germany) Philipp Petzschner
- Score: 6–3, 6–2

Events
Singles	Doubles
← 2008 ·	Intersport Heilbronn Open	· 2010 →

Rik de Voest and Bobby Reynolds were the defending champions. They chose to not defend their 2009 title.
Karol Beck and Jaroslav Levinský won in the final 6–3, 6–2, against Benedikt Dorsch and Philipp Petzschner.

== Seeds ==
1. (United States) James Cerretani / (Belgium) Dick Norman (quarterfinals)
2. (Russia) Michail Elgin / (Germany) Frank Moser (semifinals)
3. (Thailand) Sanchai Ratiwatana / (Thailand) Sonchat Ratiwatana (semifinals)
4. (Romania) Florin Mergea / (Italy) Alessandro Motti (quarterfinals)

== Draw ==
=== Key ===
- Q = Qualifier
- WC = Wild card
- LL = Lucky loser
- Alt = Alternate
- SE = Special exempt
- PR = Protected ranking
- ITF = ITF entry
- JE = Junior exempt
- w/o = Walkover
- r = Retired
- d = Defaulted
- SR = Special ranking

=== Draw ===
First round
1	(United States) J Cerretani (Belgium) D Norman	6	7
(United Kingdom) J Auckland (Pakistan) A-u-H Qureshi	4	6^{3}
(Poland) T Bednarek (Czech Republic) D Karol	2	5
(Germany) B Dorsch (Germany) P Petzschner	6	7
4	(Romania) F Mergea (Italy) A Motti	5	6	[10]
WC	(Netherlands) S Groen (Germany) D Kindlmann	7	4	[5]
WC	(Germany) David Klier (Germany) P Marx	6	7
(Romania) V Crivoi (United States) S Warburg	4	5
WC	(Germany) M Bachinger (Germany) T Kamke	2	7	[4]
ALT	(Colombia) A Falla (Colombia) S Giraldo	6	6^{2}	[10]
(Ukraine) S Bubka (Ukraine) S Stakhovsky	6^{5}	3
3	(Thailand) Sa Ratiwatana (Thailand) So Ratiwatana	7	6
(Germany) D Brands (Germany) S Stadler	6	3	[4]
(Denmark) K Pless (Thailand) D Udomchoke	3	6	[10]
(Slovakia) K Beck (Czech Republic) J Levinský	4	6	[10]
2	(Russia) M Elgin (Germany) F Moser	6	1	[8]

Quarterfinals
1	(United States) J Cerretani (Belgium) D Norman	6	6^{5}	[9]
(Germany) B Dorsch (Germany) P Petzschner	2	7	[11]
4	(Romania) F Mergea (Italy) A Motti	1	4
WC	(Germany) D Klier (Germany) P Marx	6	6
ALT	(Colombia) A Falla (Colombia) S Giraldo	4	7	[12]
3	(Thailand) Sa Ratiwatana (Thailand) So Ratiwatana	6	6^{6}	[14]
(Denmark) K Pless (Thailand) D Udomchoke	2	6^{3}
(Slovakia) K Beck (Czech Republic) J Levinský	6	7

Semifinals
(Germany) B Dorsch (Germany) P Petzschner	7	7
WC	(Germany) D Klier (Germany) P Marx	6^{3}	5
3	(Thailand) Sa Ratiwatana (Thailand) So Ratiwatana	1	4
(Slovakia) K Beck (Czech Republic) J Levinský	6	6

Finals
(Germany) B Dorsch (Germany) P Petzschner	3	2
(Slovakia) K Beck (Czech Republic) J Levinský	6	6
