= 2014 Intersport Heilbronn Open – Doubles =

Doubles
- 2014 Intersport Heilbronn Open

Final
- Champions: (Poland) Tomasz Bednarek (Finland) Henri Kontinen
- Runners-up: (United Kingdom) Ken Skupski (United Kingdom) Neal Skupski
- Score: 3–6, 7–6^{(7–3)}, [12–10]

Events
Singles	Doubles
← 2013 ·	Intersport Heilbronn Open

Johan Brunström and Raven Klaasen were the defending champions but decided not to participate.

Bednarek and Kontinen won the title, defeating Ken Skupski and Neal Skupski in the final, 3–6, 7–6^{(7–3)}, [12–10].

== Seeds ==
1. (Croatia) Marin Draganja / (Croatia) Mate Pavić (first round)
2. (Czech Republic) František Čermák / (Austria) Philipp Oswald (first round)
3. (United Kingdom) Ken Skupski / (United Kingdom) Neal Skupski (final)
4. (India) Divij Sharan / (Sweden) Andreas Siljeström (first round)

== Draw ==
=== Key ===
- Q = Qualifier
- WC = Wild card
- LL = Lucky loser
- Alt = Alternate
- SE = Special exempt
- PR = Protected ranking
- ITF = ITF entry
- JE = Junior exempt
- w/o = Walkover
- r = Retired
- d = Defaulted
- SR = Special ranking

=== Draw ===
First round
1	(Croatia) M Draganja (Croatia) M Pavić	2	5
(Germany) G Kretschmer (Germany) A Satschko	6	7
(Slovakia) M Mertiňák (Germany) F Moser	7^{7}	6
WC	(Germany) R Kern (Germany) K Krawietz	6^{3}	4
4	(India) D Sharan (Sweden) A Siljeström	6^{4}	4
(Germany) A Beck (Germany) B Becker	7^{7}	6
(Poland) T Bednarek (Finland) H Kontinen	w/o
(Czech Republic) J Hájek (Czech Republic) J Veselý
WC	(Germany) B Knittel (Germany) J-L Struff	4	5
(Germany) D Brown (Germany) P Marx	6	7
(Romania) M Copil (Netherlands) J Huta Galung	6	4	[4]
3	(United Kingdom) K Skupski (United Kingdom) N Skupski	4	6	[10]
WC	(Belgium) R Bemelmans (Belgium) O Rochus	3	6	[10]
(Thailand) Sa Ratiwatana (Thailand) So Ratiwatana	6	3	[7]
(United Kingdom) J Delgado (Poland) M Kowalczyk	6	6
2	(Czech Republic) F Čermák (Austria) P Oswald	0	4

Quarterfinals
(Germany) G Kretschmer (Germany) A Satschko	6	7
(Slovakia) M Mertiňák (Germany) F Moser	3	5
(Germany) A Beck (Germany) B Becker	6	4	[10]
(Poland) T Bednarek (Finland) H Kontinen	4	6	[12]
(Germany) D Brown (Germany) P Marx	3	6	[4]
3	(United Kingdom) K Skupski (United Kingdom) N Skupski	6	1	[10]
WC	(Belgium) R Bemelmans (Belgium) O Rochus	6	6
(United Kingdom) J Delgado (Poland) M Kowalczyk	4	3

Semifinals
(Germany) G Kretschmer (Germany) A Satschko	4	7	[8]
(Poland) T Bednarek (Finland) H Kontinen	6	5	[10]
3	(United Kingdom) K Skupski (United Kingdom) N Skupski	6	3	[10]
WC	(Belgium) R Bemelmans (Belgium) O Rochus	3	6	[7]

Final
(Poland) T Bednarek (Finland) H Kontinen	3	7^{7}	[12]
3	(United Kingdom) K Skupski (United Kingdom) N Skupski	6	6^{3}	[10]
