= 2013 Intersport Heilbronn Open – Doubles =

Doubles
- 2013 Intersport Heilbronn Open

Final
- Champions: (Sweden) Johan Brunström (South Africa) Raven Klaasen
- Runners-up: (Australia) Jordan Kerr (Sweden) Andreas Siljeström
- Score: 6–3, 0–6, [12–10]

Events
Singles	Doubles
← 2012 ·	Intersport Heilbronn Open	· 2014 →

Johan Brunström and Frederik Nielsen were the defending champions but Nielsen decided not to participate.
Brunström played alongside Raven Klaasen and successfully defended the title by defeating Jordan Kerr and Andreas Siljeström 6–3, 0–6, [12–10] in the final.

== Seeds ==
1. (Sweden) Johan Brunström / (South Africa) Raven Klaasen (champions)
2. (Russia) Mikhail Elgin / (Slovakia) Igor Zelenay (first round)
3. (United States) James Cerretani / (Canada) Adil Shamasdin (semifinals)
4. (Germany) Philipp Marx / (Romania) Florin Mergea (semifinals)

== Draw ==
=== Key ===
- Q = Qualifier
- WC = Wild card
- LL = Lucky loser
- Alt = Alternate
- SE = Special exempt
- PR = Protected ranking
- ITF = ITF entry
- JE = Junior exempt
- w/o = Walkover
- r = Retired
- d = Defaulted
- SR = Special ranking

=== Draw ===
First round
1	(Sweden) J Brunström (South Africa) R Klaasen	6	6
(Australia) R Junaid (Germany) S Stadler	3	3
(Germany) B Becker (Germany) P Petzschner	4	6	[10]
(Croatia) I Karlović (Germany) F Moser	6	4	[5]
4	(Germany) P Marx (Romania) F Mergea	4	6	[10]
(Slovakia) K Beck (Germany) A Begemann	6	2	[5]
(Czech Republic) J Hájek (Ukraine) D Molchanov	3	2
WC	(Germany) A Beck (Germany) N Langer	6	6
Alt	(Germany) Christian Hirschmüller (United Kingdom) Harry Meehan	5	5
WC	(Germany) B Knittel (Germany) J-L Struff	7	7
Alt	(Romania) M Copil (Romania) A Ungur	4	6^{6}
3	(United States) J Cerretani (Canada) A Shamasdin	6	7^{8}
(Belarus) U Ignatik (Poland) M Kowalczyk	2	6^{2}
(Australia) J Kerr (Sweden) A Siljeström	6	7^{7}
(Austria) P Oswald (Croatia) M Pavić	6	4	[12]
2	(Russia) M Elgin (Slovakia) I Zelenay	2	6	[10]

Quarterfinals
1	(Sweden) J Brunström (South Africa) R Klaasen	7	6
(Germany) B Becker (Germany) P Petzschner	5	2
4	(Germany) P Marx (Romania) F Mergea	6	6
WC	(Germany) A Beck (Germany) N Langer	1	4
WC	(Germany) B Knittel (Germany) J-L Struff	6	2	[2]
3	(United States) J Cerretani (Canada) A Shamasdin	2	6	[10]
(Australia) J Kerr (Sweden) A Siljeström	6	4	[10]
(Austria) P Oswald (Croatia) M Pavić	1	6	[8]

Semifinals
1	(Sweden) J Brunström (South Africa) R Klaasen	4	7^{7}	[10]
4	(Germany) P Marx (Romania) F Mergea	6	6^{4}	[7]
3	(United States) J Cerretani (Canada) A Shamasdin	7^{7}	6^{3}	[5]
(Australia) J Kerr (Sweden) A Siljeström	6^{5}	7^{7}	[10]

Final
1	(Sweden) J Brunström (South Africa) R Klaasen	6	0	[12]
(Australia) J Kerr (Sweden) A Siljeström	3	6	[10]
