= 2009 Intersport Heilbronn Open – Singles =

Singles
- 2009 Intersport Heilbronn Open

Final
- Champion: (Germany) Benjamin Becker
- Runner-up: (Slovakia) Karol Beck
- Score: 6–4, 6–4

Events
Singles	Doubles
← 2008 ·	Intersport Heilbronn Open	· 2010 →

Evgeny Korolev was the defending champion. He didn't take part in these championships this year.
Benjamin Becker defeated 6–4, 6–4 Karol Beck in the final.

== Seeds ==
1. (Chinese Taipei) Lu Yen-hsun (second round)
2. (Germany) Philipp Petzschner (second round)
3. (Germany) Denis Gremelmayr (first round)
4. (Ukraine) Sergiy Stakhovsky (quarterfinals)
5. (France) Arnaud Clément (quarterfinals)
6. (Croatia) ~~Roko Karanušić~~ (withdrew)
7. (Germany) Andreas Beck (second round, retired)
8. (Germany) Björn Phau (first round)

== Draw ==
=== Key ===
- Q = Qualifier
- WC = Wild card
- LL = Lucky loser
- Alt = Alternate
- ITF = ITF entry
- PR = Protected ranking
- SR = Special ranking
- SE = Special exempt
- JE = Junior exempt
- JR = Junior Accelerator Programme entrant
- CO = College Accelerator Programme entrant
- NG = Next Gen Accelerator Program entrant
- w/o = Walkover
- r = Retired
- d = Defaulted

=== Finals ===
Semifinals
(Slovakia) Karol Beck	6	6
(Germany) Michael Berrer	1	2
WC	(Germany) Florian Mayer	3	3
(Germany) Benjamin Becker	6	6

Final
(Slovakia) Karol Beck	4	4
(Germany) Benjamin Becker	6	6

=== Top half ===
First round
1	(Chinese Taipei) Y-h Lu	6	7
(France) M Montcourt	4	5
(Germany) D Brands	2	3
(Slovakia) K Beck	6	6
(Russia) M Elgin	4	3
(Denmark) K Pless	6	6
WC	(Germany) C-M Stebe	3	5
5	(France) A Clément	6	7
3	(Germany) D Gremelmayr	7	2	0
Q	(France) L Recouderc	6^{2}	6	6
(Switzerland) M Chiudinelli	2	4
(Belgium) O Rochus	6	6
(Germany) M Berrer	4	6	6
(United States) S Warburg	6	1	3
(Germany) S Greul	4	3
LL	(Colombia) A Falla	6	6

Second round
1	(Chinese Taipei) Y-h Lu	2	0
(Slovakia) K Beck	6	6
(Denmark) K Pless	2	1	r
5	(France) A Clément	6	1
Q	(France) L Recouderc	7	3	4^{r}
(Belgium) O Rochus	6^{5}	6	4
(Germany) M Berrer	6	7
LL	(Colombia) A Falla	1	6^{6}

Quarterfinals
(Slovakia) K Beck	6	6
5	(France) A Clément	3	4
(Belgium) O Rochus	1	5
(Germany) M Berrer	6	7

Semifinals
(Slovakia) K Beck	6	6
(Germany) M Berrer	1	2

=== Bottom half ===
First round
8	(Germany) B Phau	6	2	4
Q	(Germany) M Bachinger	4	6	6
WC	(Germany) F Mayer	6	6
WC	(Germany) D Kindlmann	4	3
(Germany) S Stadler	5
(France) J Ouanna	6	r
(Thailand) D Udomchoke	3	7	4
4	(Ukraine) S Stakhovsky	6	6^{4}	6
7	(Germany) A Beck	6	6
Q	(Latvia) A Juška	3	4
(Romania) V Crivoi	4	4
(Germany) B Becker	6	6
(France) A Mannarino	7	6
Q	(Germany) B Dorsch	5	1
WC	(Germany) N Langer	5	1
2	(Germany) P Petzschner	7	6

Second round
Q	(Germany) M Bachinger	6^{8}	6	4
WC	(Germany) F Mayer	7	1	6
(Germany) S Stadler	0	3
4	(Ukraine) S Stakhovsky	6	6
7	(Germany) A Beck	3	r
(Germany) B Becker	6
(France) A Mannarino	6	3	6
2	(Germany) P Petzschner	4	6	2

Quarterfinals
WC	(Germany) F Mayer	6^{5}	6	7
4	(Ukraine) S Stakhovsky	7	4	6^{5}
(Germany) B Becker	6^{1}	6	6
(France) A Mannarino	7	0	2

Semifinals
WC	(Germany) F Mayer	3	3
(Germany) B Becker	6	6
