= 2014 Intersport Heilbronn Open – Singles =

Tennis contest held in Heilbronn

Singles
- 2014 Intersport Heilbronn Open

Final
- Champion: (Germany) Peter Gojowczyk
- Runner-up: (Netherlands) Igor Sijsling
- Score: 6–4, 7–5

Events
Singles	Doubles
← 2013 ·	Intersport Heilbronn Open

Singles was an event at the 2014 Intersport Heilbronn Open, the final iteration of the Intersport Heilbronn Open tennis tournament.

Michael Berrer was the defending champion, but lost in the quarterfinal to Peter Gojowczyk.

Gojowczyk won the title, defeating Igor Sijsling in the final, 6–4, 7–5.

== Seeds ==
1. (Netherlands) Igor Sijsling (final)
2. (Germany) Benjamin Becker (second round)
3. (Czech Republic) Jiří Veselý (semifinals)
4. (France) Kenny de Schepper (first round)
5. (Slovenia) Blaž Kavčič (second round)
6. (Netherlands) Jesse Huta Galung (semifinals, retired)
7. (Germany) Dustin Brown (first round)
8. (Czech Republic) Jan Hájek (second round)

== Draw ==
=== Key ===
- Q = Qualifier
- WC = Wild card
- LL = Lucky loser
- Alt = Alternate
- ITF = ITF entry
- PR = Protected ranking
- SR = Special ranking
- SE = Special exempt
- JE = Junior exempt
- JR = Junior Accelerator Programme entrant
- CO = College Accelerator Programme entrant
- NG = Next Gen Accelerator Program entrant
- w/o = Walkover
- r = Retired
- d = Defaulted

=== Finals ===
Semifinals
1	(Netherlands) Igor Sijsling	3
6	(Netherlands) Jesse Huta Galung	1^{r}
3	(Czech Republic) Jiří Veselý	3	4
(Germany) Peter Gojowczyk	6	6

Final
1	(Netherlands) Igor Sijsling	4	5
(Germany) Peter Gojowczyk	6	7

=== Top half ===
First round
1	(Netherlands) I Sijsling	7^{7}	6
(Russia) K Kravchuk	6^{1}	4
WC	(Germany) N Langer	4	4
(Russia) E Donskoy	6	6
LL	(Austria) M Fischer	3	6	3
Q	(Italy) A Arnaboldi	6	3	6
Q	(Poland) G Panfil	1	4
5	(Slovenia) B Kavčič	6	6
4	(France) K de Schepper	3	6^{4}
(Germany) J-L Struff	6	7^{7}
(Italy) M Cecchinato	4	2^{r}
PR	(Luxembourg) G Müller	6	3
(Germany) M Bachinger	6^{8}	1
(Slovakia) A Martin	7^{10}	6
WC	(Germany) A Beck	6	3	2
6	(Netherlands) J Huta Galung	2	6	6

Second round
1	(Netherlands) I Sijsling	6	6
(Russia) E Donskoy	4	4
Q	(Italy) A Arnaboldi	7	7^{7}
5	(Slovenia) B Kavčič	5	6^{5}
(Germany) J-L Struff	4	6	6
PR	(Luxembourg) G Müller	6	3	4
(Slovakia) A Martin	3	6	3
6	(Netherlands) J Huta Galung	6	2	6

Quarterfinals
1	(Netherlands) I Sijsling	6	7
Q	(Italy) A Arnaboldi	4	5
(Germany) J-L Struff	5	6^{3}
6	(Netherlands) J Huta Galung	7	7^{7}

Semifinals
1	(Netherlands) I Sijsling	3
6	(Netherlands) J Huta Galung	1^{r}

=== Bottom half ===
First round
8	(Czech Republic) J Hájek	7	6
(France) P-H Mathieu	5	2
(Austria) A Haider-Maurer	6^{3}	6	6
WC	(Germany) R Kern	7^{7}	4	2
(Romania) M Copil	7^{7}	4	1
(Romania) A Ungur	6^{4}	6	6
(Belgium) R Bemelmans	7^{7}	6^{6}	1
3	(Czech Republic) J Veselý	6^{5}	7^{8}	6
7	(Germany) D Brown	6^{5}	3
(Germany) P Gojowczyk	7^{7}	6
(Russia) A Kuznetsov	6	6^{2}	3
Q	(Bosnia and Herzegovina) M Bašić	4	7^{7}	6
Q	(Czech Republic) J Mertl	7^{7}	6^{3}	3
(Germany) M Berrer	6^{4}	7^{7}	6
(Switzerland) M Chiudinelli	4	4
2	(Germany) B Becker	6	6

Second round
8	(Czech Republic) J Hájek	2	5
(Austria) A Haider-Maurer	6	7
(Romania) A Ungur	3	6^{4}
3	(Czech Republic) J Veselý	6	7^{7}
(Germany) P Gojowczyk	7^{8}	6
Q	(Bosnia and Herzegovina) M Bašić	6^{6}	1
(Germany) M Berrer	6	6
2	(Germany) B Becker	4	1

Quarterfinals
(Austria) A Haider-Maurer	4	6^{6}
3	(Czech Republic) J Veselý	6	7^{8}
(Germany) P Gojowczyk	6	6
(Germany) M Berrer	4	4

Semifinals
3	(Czech Republic) J Veselý	3	4
(Germany) P Gojowczyk	6	6
