= 2009 Intersport Heilbronn Open =

- Date: 26 January – 1 February
- Edition: 22nd
- Location: Talheim, Germany

Champions

Singles
- (Germany) Benjamin Becker

Doubles
- (Slovakia) Karol Beck / (Czech Republic) Jaroslav Levinský
← 2008 ·	Intersport Heilbronn Open	· 2010 →

The 2009 Intersport Heilbronn Open was a professional tennis tournament played on indoor hard courts. It was part of the Tretorn SERIE+ of the 2009 ATP Challenger Tour. It took place in Talheim, Germany between 26 January and 1 February 2009.

== Singles main-draw entrants ==
=== Seeds ===
Country	Player	Rank^{1}	Seed
TPE	Lu Yen-hsun	61	1
GER	Philipp Petzschner	63	2
GER	Denis Gremelmayr	80	3
UKR	Sergiy Stakhovsky	83	4
FRA	Arnaud Clément	89	5
CRO	~~Roko Karanušić~~	92	6
GER	Andreas Beck	103	7
GER	Björn Phau	110	8

- Rankings are as of January 19, 2009.

=== Other entrants ===
The following players received wildcards into the singles main draw:

- (Germany) Dieter Kindlmann
- (Germany) Nils Langer
- (Germany) Florian Mayer
- (Germany) Cedrik-Marcel Stebe

The following players received entry from the qualifying draw:

- (Germany) Matthias Bachinger
- (Germany) Benedikt Dorsch
- (Latvia) Andis Juška
- (France) Laurent Recouderc

The following player received the lucky loser spot:

- (Colombia) Alejandro Falla

== Champions ==
=== Men's singles ===
(Germany) Benjamin Becker def. (Slovakia) Karol Beck, 6–4, 6–4

=== Men's doubles ===
(Slovakia) Karol Beck / (Czech Republic) Jaroslav Levinský def. (Germany) Benedikt Dorsch / (Germany) Philipp Petzschner, 6–3, 6–2
