= 2011 Intersport Heilbronn Open – Singles =

Tennis contest held in Heilbronn

Singles
- 2011 Intersport Heilbronn Open

Final
- Champion: (Germany) Bastian Knittel
- Runner-up: (Germany) Daniel Brands
- Score: 7–6(4), 7–6(5)

Events
Singles	Doubles
← 2010 ·	Intersport Heilbronn Open	· 2012 →

Michael Berrer was the defending champion; however, he lost to 6th seed Daniel Brands in the quarterfinals.
Bastian Knittel defeated Brands in the final, 7–6(4), 7–6(5).

== Seeds ==
1. (Kazakhstan) Andrey Golubev (first round)
2. (Germany) Michael Berrer (quarterfinals)
3. (Germany) Tobias Kamke (second round)
4. (Germany) Rainer Schüttler (first round)
5. (Turkey) Marsel İlhan (first round)
6. (Germany) Daniel Brands (final)
7. (Germany) Julian Reister (withdrew)
8. (Switzerland) Marco Chiudinelli (first round)
9. (Germany) Denis Gremelmayr (first round)

== Draw ==
=== Key ===
- Q = Qualifier
- WC = Wild card
- LL = Lucky loser
- Alt = Alternate
- ITF = ITF entry
- PR = Protected ranking
- SR = Special ranking
- SE = Special exempt
- JE = Junior exempt
- JR = Junior Accelerator Programme entrant
- CO = College Accelerator Programme entrant
- NG = Next Gen Accelerator Program entrant
- w/o = Walkover
- r = Retired
- d = Defaulted

=== Finals ===
Semifinals
(Germany) Bastian Knittel	4	6	7
(Serbia) Ilija Bozoljac	6	3	6^{4}
(Netherlands) Jesse Huta Galung	6^{1}	5
6/WC	(Germany) Daniel Brands	7	7

Final
(Germany) Bastian Knittel	7	7
6/WC	(Germany) Daniel Brands	6^{4}	6^{5}

=== Top half ===
First round
1/WC	(Kazakhstan) A Golubev	4	2
(Germany) B Knittel	6	6
(Germany) A Beck	7	6
(Russia) K Kravchuk	6^{4}	4
(Belgium) R Bemelmans	7	6^{5}	6
LL	(Germany) D Kindlmann	5	7	2
(Germany) D Meffert	7	6
5	(Turkey) M İlhan	6^{5}	4
3/WC	(Germany) T Kamke	6	7
Q	(France) A Sidorenko	2	5
(Serbia) I Bozoljac	2	7	6
(Switzerland) S Bohli	6	6^{4}	3
(Hungary) A Balázs	6^{5}	3
(Slovakia) M Kližan	7	6
(Republic of Ireland) C Niland	7	6
8	(Switzerland) M Chiudinelli	5	2

Second round
(Germany) B Knittel	6	6
(Germany) A Beck	2	2
(Belgium) R Bemelmans	5	1
(Germany) D Meffert	7	6
3/WC	(Germany) T Kamke	4	6	3
(Serbia) I Bozoljac	6	3	6
(Slovakia) M Kližan	4	6	6^{3}
(Republic of Ireland) C Niland	6	2	7

Quarterfinals
(Germany) B Knittel	6	6
(Germany) D Meffert	1	2
(Serbia) I Bozoljac	7	6
(Republic of Ireland) C Niland	6^{8}	2

Semifinals
(Germany) B Knittel	4	6	7
(Serbia) I Bozoljac	6	3	6^{4}

=== Bottom half ===
First round
9	(Germany) D Gremelmayr	1	0
(Germany) M Bachinger	6	6
(Kazakhstan) E Korolev	3	3
(United States) A Bogomolov Jr.	6	6
(Germany) S Greul	2	2
(Netherlands) J Huta Galung	6	6
Q	(Sweden) M Ryderstedt	6	7
4	(Germany) R Schüttler	3	5
6/WC	(Germany) D Brands	6	6
Q	(France) G Burquier	4	4
(Austria) M Fischer	3	6	3
WC	(Germany) P Gojowczyk	6	2	6
(Netherlands) I Sijsling	4	3
(Poland) J Janowicz	6	6
Q	(Belgium) Y Mertens	2	1
2	(Germany) M Berrer	6	6

Second round
(Germany) M Bachinger	6	6
(United States) A Bogomolov Jr.	1	4
(Netherlands) J Huta Galung	4	7	7
Q	(Sweden) M Ryderstedt	6	6^{7}	5
6/WC	(Germany) D Brands	6	6
WC	(Germany) P Gojowczyk	3	2
(Poland) J Janowicz	3	6^{5}
2	(Germany) M Berrer	6	7

Quarterfinals
(Germany) M Bachinger	6	4	2
(Netherlands) J Huta Galung	3	6	6
6/WC	(Germany) D Brands	6	7
2	(Germany) M Berrer	3	6^{6}

Semifinals
(Netherlands) J Huta Galung	6^{1}	5
6/WC	(Germany) D Brands	7	7
