= 1997 Dubai Tennis Championships =

- Date: 10–16 February
- Edition: 5th
- Category: World Series
- Draw: 32S / 16D
- Prize money: $1,014,250
- Surface: Hard / outdoor
- Location: Dubai, United Arab Emirates
- Venue: Aviation Club Tennis Centre

Champions

Singles
- (Austria) Thomas Muster

Doubles
- (Netherlands) Sander Groen / (Croatia) Goran Ivanišević
- Dubai Tennis Championships

The 1997 Dubai Tennis Championships was a men's tennis tournament played on outdoor hard courts at the Aviation Club Tennis Centre in Dubai in the United Arab Emirates and was part of the World Series of the 1997 ATP Tour. The tournament ran from 10 February through 16 February 1997. Second-seeded Thomas Muster won the singles title.

== Finals ==
=== Singles ===
(Austria) Thomas Muster defeated (Croatia) Goran Ivanišević 7–5, 7–6^{(7–3)}

- It was Muster's 1st title of the year and the 44th of his career.

=== Doubles ===
(Netherlands) Sander Groen / (Croatia) Goran Ivanišević defeated (Australia) Sandon Stolle / (Czech Republic) Cyril Suk 7–6, 6–3

- It was Groen's only title of the year and the 1st of his career. It was Ivanišević's 3rd title of the year and the 27th of his career.
