= 2010 Intersport Heilbronn Open – Singles =

Singles
- 2010 Intersport Heilbronn Open

Final
- Champion: (Germany) Michael Berrer
- Runner-up: (Kazakhstan) Andrey Golubev
- Score: 6–3, 7–6(4)

Events
Singles	Doubles
← 2009 ·	Intersport Heilbronn Open	· 2011 →

Benjamin Becker was the defending champion, but he chose to not participate this year.
Michael Berrer won in the final 6–3, 7–6(4) against Andrey Golubev.

== Seeds ==
1. (Germany) Michael Berrer (champion)
2. (Germany) Daniel Brands (first round)
3. (Czech Republic) Jan Hernych (first round)
4. (Croatia) Mario Ančić (first round)
5. (Israel) Harel Levy (first round)
6. (Slovakia) Karol Beck (quarterfinals)
7. (Germany) Björn Phau (first round)
8. (Ukraine) Oleksandr Dolgopolov Jr. (semifinals)

== Draw ==
=== Key ===
- Q = Qualifier
- WC = Wild card
- LL = Lucky loser
- Alt = Alternate
- ITF = ITF entry
- PR = Protected ranking
- SR = Special ranking
- SE = Special exempt
- JE = Junior exempt
- JR = Junior Accelerator Programme entrant
- CO = College Accelerator Programme entrant
- NG = Next Gen Accelerator Program entrant
- w/o = Walkover
- r = Retired
- d = Defaulted

=== Finals ===
Semifinals
1	(Germany) Michael Berrer	6	6
8	(Ukraine) Oleksandr Dolgopolov Jr.	2	3
(France) Josselin Ouanna	7	5	6^{11}
(Kazakhstan) Andrey Golubev	6^{3}	7	7

Final
1	(Germany) Michael Berrer	6	7
(Kazakhstan) Andrey Golubev	3	6^{4}

=== Top half ===
First round
1	(Germany) M Berrer	7	5	6
(Spain) I Navarro	5	7	3
(Jamaica) D Brown	6	7
(Serbia) I Bozoljac	4	6^{7}
(Germany) D Kindlmann	6	7
Q	(Czech Republic) J Mertl	1	5
Q	(Germany) T Kamke	6^{2}	7	7
7	(Germany) B Phau	7	5	6^{6}
4	(Croatia) M Ančić	3	7	2
(Kazakhstan) M Kukushkin	6	6^{5}	6
(Switzerland) S Bohli	6	6
WC	(Republic of Ireland) L Sorensen	2	3
(United Kingdom) A Bogdanović	3	2
(France) T Ascione	6	6
LL	(Czech Republic) R Vik	5	5^{3}
8	(Ukraine) O Dolgopolov Jr.	7	7

Second round
1	(Germany) M Berrer	6	7
(Jamaica) D Brown	4	5
(Germany) D Kindlmann	6	4	3
Q	(Germany) T Kamke	4	6	6
(Kazakhstan) M Kukushkin	6	6
(Switzerland) S Bohli	2	4
(France) T Ascione	4	4
8	(Ukraine) O Dolgopolov Jr.	6	6

Quarterfinals
1	(Germany) M Berrer	7	6
Q	(Germany) T Kamke	6^{4}	4
(Kazakhstan) M Kukushkin	4	3
8	(Ukraine) O Dolgopolov Jr.	6	6

Semifinals
1	(Germany) M Berrer	6	6
8	(Ukraine) O Dolgopolov Jr.	2	3

=== Bottom half ===
First round
6	(Slovakia) K Beck	6	6
Q	(Kazakhstan) Y Schukin	2	2
(Czech Republic) L Rosol	6	6
(Germany) J Reister	3	3
(France) J Ouanna	7	6
WC	(Germany) N Langer	6^{5}	3
(United States) B Evans	4	7	6
3	(Czech Republic) J Hernych	6	6^{5}	0
5	(Israel) H Levy	3	2
(France) L Recouderc	6	6
(Slovakia) D Hrbatý	6	6
(France) A Sidorenko	4	3
WC	(Germany) C-M Stebe	7	6
Q	(Poland) M Przysiężny	6^{6}	3
(Kazakhstan) A Golubev	6^{3}	7	6
2	(Germany) D Brands	7	5	4

Second round
6	(Slovakia) K Beck	5	7	6
(Czech Republic) L Rosol	7	6^{3}	4
(France) J Ouanna	6	6
(United States) B Evans	2	2
(France) L Recouderc	4	3
(Slovakia) D Hrbatý	6	6
WC	(Germany) C-M Stebe	1	2
(Kazakhstan) A Golubev	6	6

Quarterfinals
6	(Slovakia) K Beck	4	6	3
(France) J Ouanna	6	3	6
(Slovakia) D Hrbatý	6^{5}	3
(Kazakhstan) A Golubev	7	6

Semifinals
(France) J Ouanna	7	5	6^{11}
(Kazakhstan) A Golubev	6^{3}	7	7
