= 2010 Intersport Heilbronn Open =

- Date: January 25 – January 31
- Edition: 23rd
- Location: Talheim, Germany

Champions

Singles
- (Germany) Michael Berrer

Doubles
- (Thailand) Sanchai Ratiwatana / (Thailand) Sonchat Ratiwatana
← 2009 ·	Intersport Heilbronn Open	· 2011 →

The 2010 Intersport Heilbronn Open (known as the 2010 Intersport Heilbronn Open presented by Wilson for sponsorship reasons) was a professional tennis tournament played on indoor hard courts. It was part of the 2010 ATP Challenger Tour. It took place in Talheim, Germany between 25 and 31 January 2010.

== ATP entrants ==
=== Seeds ===
Country	Player	Rank^{1}	Seed
GER	Michael Berrer	66	1
GER	Daniel Brands	91	2
CZE	Jan Hernych	109	3
CRO	Mario Ančić	115	4
ISR	Harel Levy	116	5
SVK	Karol Beck	117	6
GER	Björn Phau	118	7
UKR	Oleksandr Dolgopolov Jr.	123	8

- Rankings are as of January 18, 2010.

=== Other entrants ===
The following players received wildcards into the singles main draw:

- (Germany) Nils Langer
- (Republic of Ireland) Louk Sorensen
- (Germany) Cedrik-Marcel Stebe

The following players received entry from the qualifying draw:

- (Germany) Tobias Kamke
- (Czech Republic) Jan Mertl
- (Poland) Michał Przysiężny
- (Kazakhstan) Yuri Schukin

The following player received the lucky loser spot:

- (Czech Republic) Robin Vik

== Champions ==
=== Singles ===
(Germany) Michael Berrer def. (Kazakhstan) Andrey Golubev, 6–3, 7–6^{(7–4)}.

=== Doubles ===
(Thailand) Sanchai Ratiwatana / (Thailand) Sonchat Ratiwatana def. (Croatia) Mario Ančić / (Croatia) Lovro Zovko, 6–4, 7–5.
