= 2012 Intersport Heilbronn Open =

- Date: 23 – 29 January
- Edition: 25th
- Location: Heilbronn, Germany

Champions

Singles
- (Germany) Björn Phau

Doubles
- (Sweden) Johan Brunström / (Denmark) Frederik Nielsen
← 2011 ·	Intersport Heilbronn Open	· 2013 →

The 2012 Intersport Heilbronn Open was a professional tennis tournament played on hard courts. It was the 25th edition of the tournament, which was part of the 2012 ATP Challenger Tour. It took place in Heilbronn, Germany between 23 and 29 January 2012.

== Singles main-draw entrants ==
=== Seeds ===
Country	Player	Rank^{1}	Seed
LUX	Gilles Müller	55	1
GER	Cedrik-Marcel Stebe	83	2
GER	Matthias Bachinger	89	3
USA	Michael Russell	97	4
SVK	Karol Beck	100	5
GER	Michael Berrer	102	6
SVN	Grega Žemlja	110	7
GER	Daniel Brands	112	8

- ^{1} Rankings are as of January 16, 2012.

=== Other entrants ===
The following players received wildcards into the singles main draw:

- (Germany) Benjamin Becker
- (Germany) Bastian Knittel
- (Germany) Kevin Krawietz
- (Luxembourg) Gilles Müller

The following players received entry from the qualifying draw:

- (Belgium) Ruben Bemelmans
- (Poland) Marcin Gawron
- (Germany) Dominik Meffert
- (Germany) Mischa Zverev

== Champions ==
=== Singles ===
(Germany) Björn Phau def. (Belgium) Ruben Bemelmans, 6–7^{(4–7)}, 6–3, 6–4

=== Doubles ===
(Sweden) Johan Brunström / (Denmark) Frederik Nielsen def. (Philippines) Treat Conrad Huey / (United Kingdom) Dominic Inglot, 6–3, 3–6, [10–6]
