= 2013 Intersport Heilbronn Open =

- Date: 21–27 January
- Edition: 26th
- Draw: 32S / 16D
- Prize money: €85,000+H
- Surface: Hard
- Location: Heilbronn, Germany

Champions

Singles
- (Germany) Michael Berrer

Doubles
- (Sweden) Johan Brunström / (South Africa) Raven Klaasen
← 2012 ·	Intersport Heilbronn Open	· 2014 →

The 2013 Intersport Heilbronn Open was a professional tennis tournament played on hard courts. It was the 25th edition of the tournament which was part of the 2013 ATP Challenger Tour. It took place in Heilbronn, Germany between 23 and 29 January 2013.

== Singles main draw entrants ==
=== Seeds ===
Country	Player	Rank^{1}	Seed
FRA	Paul-Henri Mathieu	60	1
GER	Benjamin Becker	66	2
LUX	Gilles Müller	69	3
GER	Björn Phau	78	4
ROU	Adrian Ungur	99	5
CRO	Ivo Karlović	103	6
CZE	Jan Hájek	104	7
BEL	Ruben Bemelmans	114	8

- ^{1} Rankings are as of January 14, 2013.

=== Other entrants ===
The following players received wildcards into the singles main draw:

- (Germany) Andreas Beck
- (France) Paul-Henri Mathieu
- (Germany) Cedrik-Marcel Stebe
- (Germany) Jan-Lennard Struff

The following players received entry from the qualifying draw:

- (Slovakia) Pavol Červenák
- (Germany) Bastian Knittel
- (Germany) Dominik Meffert
- (France) Maxime Teixeira

== Doubles main-draw entrants ==
=== Seeds ===
Country	Player	Country	Player	Rank^{1}	Seed
SWE	Johan Brunström	RSA	Raven Klaasen	125	1
RUS	Mikhail Elgin	SVK	Igor Zelenay	140	2
USA	James Cerretani	CAN	Adil Shamasdin	154	3
GER	Philipp Marx	ROU	Florin Mergea	165	4

- ^{1} Rankings are as of January 14, 2013.

=== Other entrants ===
The following pairs received wildcards into the doubles main draw:

- (Germany) Andreas Beck / (Germany) Nils Langer
- (Germany) Bastian Knittel / (Germany) Jan-Lennard Struff
- (Germany) ~~Dominik Meffert / (Germany) Björn Phau~~

The following pairs received entry as alternates:

- (Romania) Marius Copil / (Romania) Adrian Ungur
- (Germany) Christian Hirschmüller / (United Kingdom) Harry Meehan

== Champions ==
=== Singles ===
- (Germany) Michael Berrer def. (Germany) Jan-Lennard Struff, 7–5, 6–3

=== Doubles ===
- (Sweden) Johan Brunström / (South Africa) Raven Klaasen def. (Australia) Jordan Kerr / (Sweden) Andreas Siljeström, 6–3, 0–6, [12–10]
