= 2010 Intersport Heilbronn Open – Doubles =

Doubles
- 2010 Intersport Heilbronn Open

Final
- Champions: (Thailand) Sanchai Ratiwatana (Thailand) Sonchat Ratiwatana
- Runners-up: (Croatia) Mario Ančić (Croatia) Lovro Zovko
- Score: 6–4, 7–5

Events
Singles	Doubles
- Intersport Heilbronn Open

Karol Beck and Jaroslav Levinský were the defending champions of the 2010 Intersport Heilbronn Open, but they chose to not participate this year.
Sanchai Ratiwatana and Sonchat Ratiwatana won in the final 6–4, 7–5, against Mario Ančić and Lovro Zovko

== Seeds ==
1. (Thailand) Sanchai Ratiwatana / (Thailand) Sonchat Ratiwatana (champions)
2. (Austria) Martin Fischer / (Austria) Alexander Peya (quarterfinals)
3. (Poland) Tomasz Bednarek / (Poland) Mateusz Kowalczyk (quarterfinals)
4. (Israel) Harel Levy / (Italy) Alessandro Motti (quarterfinals)

== Draw ==
Key

- Q = Qualifier
- WC = Wild card
- LL = Lucky loser
- Alt = Alternate
- ITF = ITF entry
- PR = Protected ranking
- SR = Special ranking
- SE = Special exempt
- JE = Junior exempt
- JR = Junior Accelerator Programme entrant
- CO = College Accelerator Programme entrant
- NG = Next Gen Accelerator Program entrant
- w/o = Walkover
- r = Retired
- d = Defaulted

=== Draw ===
First round
1	(Thailand) Sa Ratiwatana (Thailand) So Ratiwatana	6	6
(Croatia) F Škugor (Croatia) I Zovko	3	3
(Serbia) I Bozoljac (United Kingdom) J Delgado	6	2	[10]
(Slovakia) I Klec (Germany) S Stadler	4	6	[5]
3	(Poland) T Bednarek (Poland) M Kowalczyk	6	6
WC	(Czech Republic) J Mertl (Czech Republic) R Vik	4	2
(Slovakia) K Beck (Czech Republic) J Krkoška	6	3	[8]
(Slovakia) D Hrbatý (Czech Republic) L Rosol	2	6	[10]
(Spain) I Navarro (Poland) M Przysiężny	6	7
(United Kingdom) A Bogdanović (Russia) A Kudryavtsev	4	5
WC	(Netherlands) S Groen (Sweden) A Vinciguerra	6^{4}	6^{4}
4	(Israel) H Levy (Italy) A Motti	7	7
(Croatia) M Ančić (Croatia) L Zovko	7	6
(Germany) L Ilg (Germany) M Zelch	6^{4}	1
(Jamaica) D Brown (United States) B Evans	0	4
2	(Austria) M Fischer (Austria) A Peya	6	6

Quarterfinals
1	(Thailand) Sa Ratiwatana (Thailand) So Ratiwatana	7	7
(Serbia) I Bozoljac (United Kingdom) J Delgado	5	6^{7}
3	(Poland) T Bednarek (Poland) M Kowalczyk	7	4	[8]
(Slovakia) D Hrbatý (Czech Republic) L Rosol	5	6	[10]
(Spain) I Navarro (Poland) M Przysiężny	7	7
4	(Israel) H Levy (Italy) A Motti	6^{8}	5
(Croatia) M Ančić (Croatia) L Zovko	6	6
2	(Austria) M Fischer (Austria) A Peya	4	3

Semifinals
1	(Thailand) Sa Ratiwatana (Thailand) So Ratiwatana	6	7
(Slovakia) D Hrbatý (Czech Republic) L Rosol	4	5
(Spain) I Navarro (Poland) M Przysiężny	3	4
(Croatia) M Ančić (Croatia) L Zovko	6	6

Finals
1	(Thailand) Sa Ratiwatana (Thailand) So Ratiwatana	6	7
(Croatia) M Ančić (Croatia) L Zovko	4	5
