= 2011 Intersport Heilbronn Open =

- Date: 24–30 January
- Edition: 24th
- Location: Heilbronn, Germany

Champions

Singles
- (Germany) Bastian Knittel

Doubles
- (United Kingdom) Jamie Delgado / (United Kingdom) Jonathan Marray
← 2010 ·	Intersport Heilbronn Open	· 2012 →

The 2011 Intersport Heilbronn Open was a professional tennis tournament played on hard courts. It was the 24th edition of the tournament which was part of the 2011 ATP Challenger Tour. It took place in Heilbronn, Germany between 24 and 30 January 2011.

== Singles main-draw entrants ==
=== Seeds ===
Country	Player	Rank^{1}	Seed
KAZ	Andrey Golubev	38	1
GER	Michael Berrer	61	2
GER	Tobias Kamke	65	3
GER	Rainer Schüttler	83	4
TUR	Marsel İlhan	87	5
GER	Daniel Brands	102	6
GER	~~Julian Reister~~	112	7
SUI	Marco Chiudinelli	114	8
GER	Denis Gremelmayr	120	9

- Rankings are as of January 17, 2011.

=== Other entrants ===
The following players received wildcards into the singles main draw:

- (Germany) Daniel Brands
- (Germany) Peter Gojowczyk
- (Kazakhstan) Andrey Golubev
- (Germany) Tobias Kamke

The following players received entry from the qualifying draw:

- (France) Grégoire Burquier
- (Belgium) Yannick Mertens
- (Sweden) Michael Ryderstedt
- (France) Alexandre Sidorenko

The following players received entry as a Lucky loser into the singles main draw:

- (Germany) Dieter Kindlmann

== Champions ==
=== Singles ===
(Germany) Bastian Knittel def. (Germany) Daniel Brands, 7–6(4), 7–6(5)

=== Doubles ===
(United Kingdom) Jamie Delgado / (United Kingdom) Jonathan Marray def. (Germany) Frank Moser / (Czech Republic) David Škoch, 6–1, 6–4
