= 2013 Intersport Heilbronn Open – Singles =

Tennis contest held in Heilbronn

Singles
- 2013 Intersport Heilbronn Open

Final
- Champion: (Germany) Michael Berrer
- Runner-up: (Germany) Jan-Lennard Struff
- Score: 7–5, 6–3

Events
Singles	Doubles
- Intersport Heilbronn Open

Björn Phau was the defending champion but he retired in the first round.
Michael Berrer defeated Jan-Lennard Struff 7–5, 6–3 in the final to win the title.

== Seeds ==
1. (France) Paul-Henri Mathieu (semifinals, retired)
2. (Germany) Benjamin Becker (quarterfinals)
3. (Luxembourg) Gilles Müller (first round)
4. (Germany) Björn Phau (first round, retired due to a knee injury)
5. (Romania) Adrian Ungur (second round)
6. (Croatia) Ivo Karlović (first round, retired due to a back injury)
7. (Czech Republic) Jan Hájek (second round)
8. (Belgium) Ruben Bemelmans (quarterfinals)

== Draw ==
Key

- Q = Qualifier
- WC = Wild card
- LL = Lucky loser
- Alt = Alternate
- ITF = ITF entry
- PR = Protected ranking
- SR = Special ranking
- SE = Special exempt
- JE = Junior exempt
- JR = Junior Accelerator Programme entrant
- CO = College Accelerator Programme entrant
- NG = Next Gen Accelerator Program entrant
- w/o = Walkover
- r = Retired
- d = Defaulted

=== Finals ===
Semifinals
1/WC	(France) Paul-Henri Mathieu	2	0^{r}
(Germany) Michael Berrer	6	1
(Belgium) Olivier Rochus	5	0
WC	(Germany) Jan-Lennard Struff	7	6

Final
(Germany) Michael Berrer	7	6
WC	(Germany) Jan-Lennard Struff	5	3

=== Top half ===
First round
1/WC	(France) P-H Mathieu	6	6
(Serbia) D Lajović	3	4
(Germany) M Bachinger	1	2
(Latvia) E Gulbis	6	6
(France) J Ouanna	3^{r}
Q	(Slovakia) P Červenák	4
(Canada) F Dancevic	6^{4}	7
6	(Croatia) I Karlović	7^{7}	5	r
4	(Germany) B Phau	3	0^{r}
(Ukraine) I Marchenko	6	3
Q	(France) M Teixeira	6^{7}	1
(Germany) M Berrer	7^{9}	6
(Belarus) U Ignatik	6	6
Q	(Germany) D Meffert	4	3
(Belgium) M Authom	7^{7}	1	1
8	(Belgium) R Bemelmans	6^{3}	6	6

Second round
1/WC	(France) P-H Mathieu	6	2	7^{7}
(Latvia) E Gulbis	2	6	6^{5}
Q	(Slovakia) P Červenák	6^{3}	7^{7}	3
(Canada) F Dancevic	7^{7}	6^{3}	6
(Ukraine) I Marchenko	1	1
(Germany) M Berrer	6	6
(Belarus) U Ignatik	6^{5}	2
8	(Belgium) R Bemelmans	7^{7}	6

Quarterfinals
1/WC	(France) P-H Mathieu	6	6^{8}	7^{8}
(Canada) F Dancevic	1	7^{10}	6^{6}
(Germany) M Berrer	6	7^{9}
8	(Belgium) R Bemelmans	4	6^{7}

Semifinals
1/WC	(France) P-H Mathieu	2	0^{r}
(Germany) M Berrer	6	1

=== Bottom half ===
First round
7	(Czech Republic) J Hájek	7	6
Q	(Germany) B Knittel	6^{3}	4
(Romania) M Copil	6	6
WC	(Germany) A Beck	3	2
(Italy) M Viola	3	5
(Belgium) O Rochus	6	7
(Germany) P Petzschner	6	1	6
3	(Luxembourg) G Müller	1	6	4
5	(Romania) A Ungur	7^{7}	3
WC	(Germany) C-M Stebe	6^{4}	0^{r}
WC	(Germany) J-L Struff	6	6
(France) K de Schepper	3	2
(Slovakia) K Beck	2	3
(France) F Serra	6	6
(Ukraine) I Sergeyev	3	2
2	(Germany) B Becker	6	6

Second round
7	(Czech Republic) J Hájek	4	5
(Romania) M Copil	6	7
(Belgium) O Rochus	6	6
(Germany) P Petzschner	4	3
5	(Romania) A Ungur	6	3	3
WC	(Germany) J-L Struff	3	6	6
(France) F Serra	5	2
2	(Germany) B Becker	7	6

Quarterfinals
(Romania) M Copil	4	2
(Belgium) O Rochus	6	6
WC	(Germany) J-L Struff	6	4	7^{7}
2	(Germany) B Becker	1	6	6^{2}

Semifinals
(Belgium) O Rochus	5	0
WC	(Germany) J-L Struff	7	6
