= 2014 Intersport Heilbronn Open =

- Date: 20–26 January
- Edition: 27th
- Draw: 32S / 16D
- Prize money: €106,500+H
- Surface: Hard
- Location: Heilbronn, Germany

Champions

Singles
- (Germany) Peter Gojowczyk

Doubles
- (Poland) Tomasz Bednarek / (Finland) Henri Kontinen
← 2013 ·	Intersport Heilbronn Open

The 2014 Intersport Heilbronn Open was a professional tennis tournament played on hard courts. It was the 27th edition of the tournament which was part of the 2014 ATP Challenger Tour. It took place in Heilbronn, Germany between 20 and 26 January 2014.

== Singles main-draw entrants ==
=== Seeds ===
Country	Player	Rank^{1}	Seed
NED	Igor Sijsling	73	1
GER	Benjamin Becker	81	2
CZE	Jiří Veselý	83	3
FRA	Kenny de Schepper	86	4
SLO	Blaž Kavčič	99	5
NED	Jesse Huta Galung	100	6
GER	Dustin Brown	101	7
CZE	Jan Hájek	103	8

- ^{1} Rankings are as of January 13, 2014.

=== Other entrants ===
The following players received wildcards into the singles main draw:

- (Germany) Andreas Beck
- (Germany) Robin Kern
- (Germany) Nils Langer

The following players used protected ranking to get into the singles main draw:

- (Luxembourg) Gilles Müller

The following players received entry from the qualifying draw:

- (Italy) Andrea Arnaboldi
- (Bosnia and Herzegovina) Mirza Bašić
- (Czech Republic) Jan Mertl
- (Poland) Grzegorz Panfil

The following players received entry as a lucky loser:

- (Austria) Martin Fischer

== Champions ==
=== Singles ===
- (Germany) Peter Gojowczyk def. (Netherlands) Igor Sijsling, 6–4, 7–5

=== Doubles ===
- (Poland) Tomasz Bednarek / (Finland) Henri Kontinen def. (United Kingdom) Ken Skupski / (United Kingdom) Neal Skupski, 3–6, 7–6^{(7–3)}, [12–10]
