= 1997 Dubai Tennis Championships – Singles =

Singles
- 1997 Dubai Tennis Championships

Final
- Champion: (Austria) Thomas Muster
- Runner-up: (Croatia) Goran Ivanišević
- Score: 7–5, 7–6^{(7–3)}

Details
- Draw: 32
- Seeds: 8

Events
| Singles | Doubles |
| ← 1996 · | Dubai Tennis Championships | · 1998 → |

Goran Ivanišević was the defending champion but lost in the final 7–5, 7–6^{(7–3)} against Thomas Muster.

== Seeds ==
A champion seed is indicated in bold text while text in italics indicates the round in which that seed was eliminated.

1. (Croatia) Goran Ivanišević (final)
2. (Austria) **Thomas Muster (champion)**
3. (Netherlands) Richard Krajicek (quarterfinals)
4. (South Africa) Wayne Ferreira (quarterfinals)
5. (Spain) Carlos Moyá (first round)
6. (Spain) Albert Costa (second round)
7. (Germany) Boris Becker (quarterfinals)
8. (Spain) Félix Mantilla (first round)

== Draw ==
=== Key ===
- Q = Qualifier
- WC = Wild card
- LL = Lucky loser
- Alt = Alternate
- SE = Special exempt
- PR = Protected ranking
- ITF = ITF entry
- JE = Junior exempt
- w/o = Walkover
- r = Retired
- d = Defaulted
- SR = Special ranking

First round
1 | (Croatia) **G Ivanišević** | **6** | **6**
(Morocco) Y El Aynaoui | 3 | 4
(Czech Republic) **B Ulihrach** | **6** | **6**
(Germany) B Karbacher | 4 | 3
LL | (Czech Republic) D Rikl | 5 | 3
(Australia) **S Stolle** | **7** | **6**
(Germany) M-K Goellner | 2 | **7^{7}** | 2
7 | (Germany) **B Becker** | **6** | 6^{5} | **6**
3 | (Netherlands) **R Krajicek** | 5 | **6** | **6**
WC | (India) L Paes | **7** | 4 | 2
Q | (Sweden) L Jonsson | 4 | **7^{7}** | 2
(Spain) **J Sánchez** | **6** | 6^{2} | **6**
(Italy) R Furlan | 4 | 6^{6}
LL | (Netherlands) **H J Davids** | **6** | **7^{8}**
(Czech Republic) **J Novák** | 2 | **6** | **7**
5 | (Spain) C Moyá | **6** | 0 | 5
6 | (Spain) **A Costa** | **6** | **6**
(Germany) D Prinosil | 2 | 4
(Ukraine) A Medvedev | 3 | 0
(United States) **J Courier** | **6** | **6**
WC | (Australia) **P Cash** | **7^{7}** | **7^{8}**
(Spain) C Costa | 6^{4} | 6^{6}
(Spain) R Carretero | 3 | 6^{8}
4 | (South Africa) **W Ferreira** | **6** | **7^{10}**
8 | (Spain) F Mantilla | 4 | **6** | 3
(Norway) **C Ruud** | **6** | 2 | **6**
(Argentina) **H Gumy** | **6** | **6**
Q | (Australia) J Sekulov | 4 | 3
(United Kingdom) T Henman | 6^{5} | 4
Q | (Germany) **M Sinner** | **7^{7}** | **6**
Q | (Sweden) T Nydahl | 4 | 3
WC/2 | (Austria) **T Muster** | **6** | **6**

Second round
1 | (Croatia) **G Ivanišević** | **7^{10}** | **6**
(Czech Republic) B Ulihrach | 6^{8} | 4
(Australia) S Stolle | 6^{7} | 1
7 | (Germany) **B Becker** | **7^{9}** | **6**
3 | (Netherlands) **R Krajicek** | **6** | **6**
(Spain) J Sánchez | 3 | 2
LL | (Netherlands) H J Davids | 3 | 3
(Czech Republic) **J Novák** | **6** | **6**
6 | (Spain) A Costa | 2 | 3
(United States) **J Courier** | **6** | **6**
WC | (Australia) P Cash | **6** | 2 | 5
4 | (South Africa) **W Ferreira** | 3 | **6** | **7**
(Norway) **C Ruud** | 1 | **6** | **6**
(Argentina) H Gumy | **6** | 4 | 2
Q | (Germany) M Sinner | 4 | 4
WC/2 | (Austria) **T Muster** | **6** | **6**

Quarterfinals
1 | (Croatia) **G Ivanišević** | w/o
7 | (Germany) B Becker
3 | (Netherlands) R Krajicek | 2 | 2
(Czech Republic) **J Novák** | **6** | **6**
(United States) **J Courier** | **6** | **7**
4 | (South Africa) W Ferreira | 2 | 5
(Norway) C Ruud | 4 | **7^{7}** | 5
WC/2 | (Austria) **T Muster** | **6** | 6^{3} | **7**

Semifinals
1 | (Croatia) **G Ivanišević** | **6** | 3 | **6**
(Czech Republic) J Novák | 1 | **6** | 3
(United States) J Courier | 6^{3} | **6** | 3
WC/2 | (Austria) **T Muster** | **7^{7}** | 2 | **6**

Final
1 | (Croatia) Goran Ivanišević | 5 | 6^{3}
WC/2 | (Austria) **Thomas Muster** | **7** | **7^{7}**
