= 1997 Dubai Tennis Championships – Doubles =

Doubles
- 1997 Dubai Tennis Championships

Final
- Champions: (Netherlands) Sander Groen (Croatia) Goran Ivanišević
- Runners-up: (Australia) Sandon Stolle (Czech Republic) Cyril Suk
- Score: 7–6, 6–3

Details
- Draw: 16
- Seeds: 4

Events
Singles	Doubles
- Dubai Tennis Championships

Byron Black and Grant Connell were the defending champions but did not compete that year.

Sander Groen and Goran Ivanišević won in the final 7–6, 6–3 against Sandon Stolle and Cyril Suk.

== Seeds ==
1. (South Africa) Ellis Ferreira / (United States) Patrick Galbraith (semifinals)
2. (Belgium) Libor Pimek / (South Africa) Byron Talbot (first round)
3. (Australia) Sandon Stolle / (Czech Republic) Cyril Suk (final)
4. (Australia) Andrew Kratzmann / (Czech Republic) Pavel Vízner (first round)

== Draw ==
Key

- Q = Qualifier
- WC = Wild card
- LL = Lucky loser
- Alt = Alternate
- ITF = ITF entry
- PR = Protected ranking
- SR = Special ranking
- SE = Special exempt
- JE = Junior exempt
- JR = Junior Accelerator Programme entrant
- CO = College Accelerator Programme entrant
- NG = Next Gen Accelerator Program entrant
- w/o = Walkover
- r = Retired
- d = Defaulted

First round
1	(South Africa) E Ferreira (United States) P Galbraith	6	6
(United States) S Cannon (The Bahamas) R Smith	2	3
WC	(Germany) B Becker (Germany) P Kühnen	5	3
(Australia) J Eagle (Australia) A Florent	7	6
4	(Australia) A Kratzmann (Czech Republic) P Vízner	3	4
(Netherlands) S Groen (Croatia) G Ivanišević	6	6
Q	(South Africa) D Nainkin (Netherlands) R Wassen	7	4	6
WC	(Australia) P Cash (United Kingdom) T Henman	6	6	4
WC	(Morocco) K Alami (Morocco) H Arazi	4	7	5^{d}
(Argentina) P Albano (Sweden) P Nyborg	6	6	6
(South Africa) M Barnard (Netherlands) H J Davids	5	3
3	(Australia) S Stolle (Czech Republic) C Suk	7	6
(Germany) D Prinosil (Spain) J Sánchez	3
(India) M Bhupathi (India) L Paes	2^{r}
(Czech Republic) J Novák (Czech Republic) D Rikl	6	5	6
2	(Belgium) L Pimek (South Africa) B Talbot	4	7	3

Quarterfinals
1	(South Africa) E Ferreira (United States) P Galbraith	6	6
(Australia) J Eagle (Australia) A Florent	3	2
(Netherlands) S Groen (Croatia) G Ivanišević	6	6
Q	(South Africa) D Nainkin (Netherlands) R Wassen	4	4
(Argentina) P Albano (Sweden) P Nyborg	1	6	3
3	(Australia) S Stolle (Czech Republic) C Suk	6	1	6
(Germany) D Prinosil (Spain) J Sánchez	6	6
(Czech Republic) J Novák (Czech Republic) D Rikl	2	3

Semifinals
1	(South Africa) E Ferreira (United States) P Galbraith	6	3	6
(Netherlands) S Groen (Croatia) G Ivanišević	3	6	7
3	(Australia) S Stolle (Czech Republic) C Suk	6	5	6
(Germany) D Prinosil (Spain) J Sánchez	1	7	4

Final
(Netherlands) S Groen (Croatia) G Ivanišević	7	6
3	(Australia) S Stolle (Czech Republic) C Suk	6	3
