= Talheim, Heilbronn =

Talheim
- Municipality
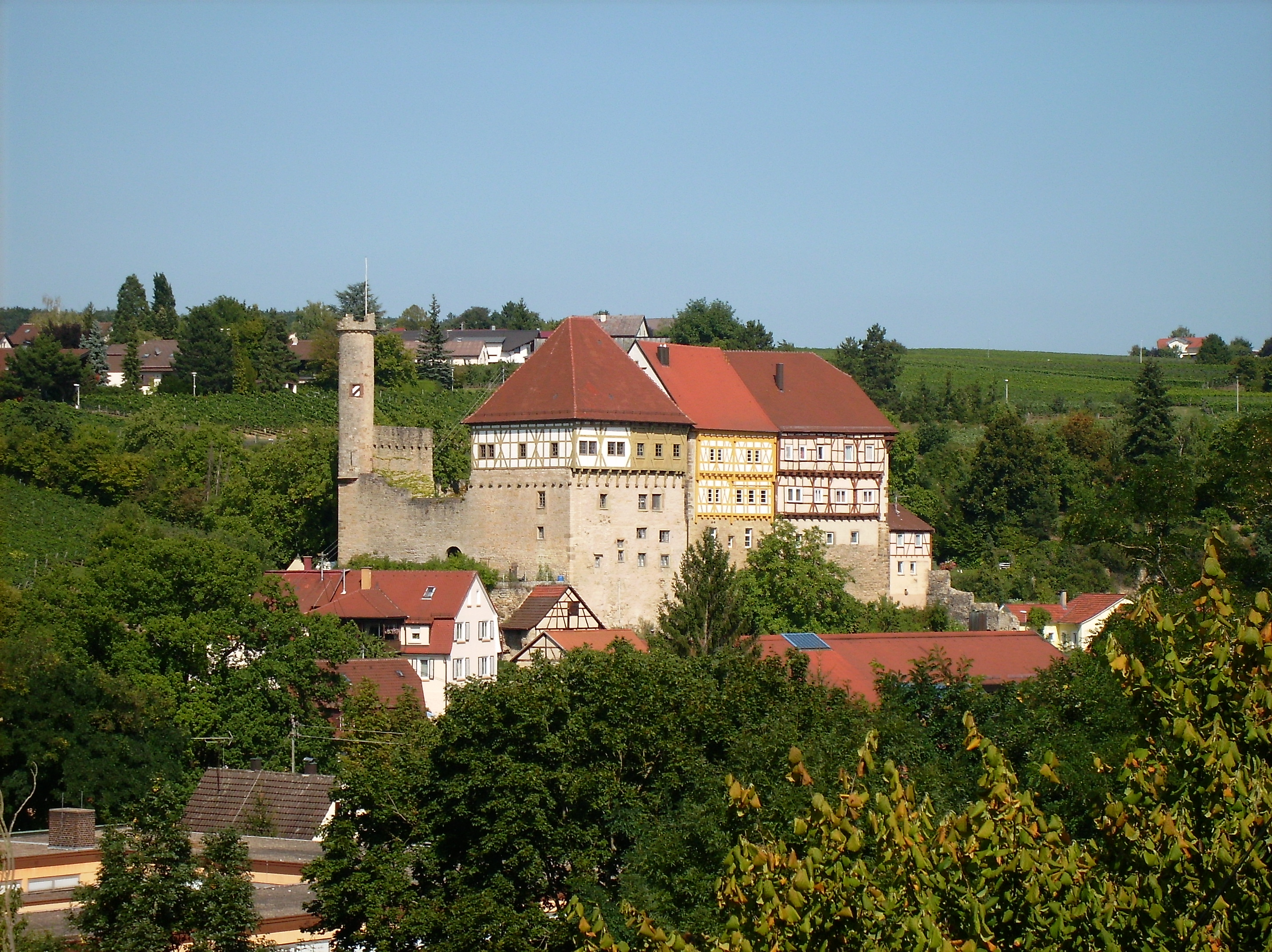
- Old Castle seen from west

- Coat of arms

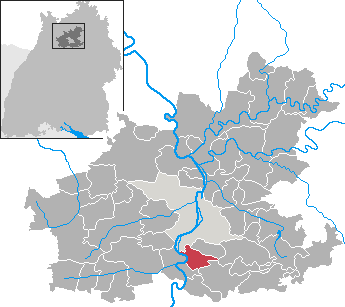
- Location of Talheim within Heilbronn district
- Interactive map of Talheim
- Location within Germany Location within Baden-Württemberg
- Coordinates: 49°5′N 9°12′E
- Country: Germany
- State: Baden-Württemberg
- Admin. region: Stuttgart
- District: Heilbronn
- Founded: 6th century

Government
  - Mayor (2017–25): Rainer Gräßle (Ind.)

Area
  - Total: 11.62 km^{2} (4.49 sq mi)
- Elevation: 236 m (774 ft)

Population (2025-12-31)
  - Total: 5,095
  - Density: 438.5/km^{2} (1,136/sq mi)
- Time zone: UTC+01:00 (CET)
  - Summer (DST): UTC+02:00 (CEST)
- Postal codes: 74388
- Dialling codes: 07133
- Vehicle registration: HN
- Website: www.talheim.de

Talheim (German: [ˈtaːlhaɪm]) is a municipality in the district of Heilbronn in Baden-Württemberg in southern Germany. It is commonly known for its wine, the tennis tournament Heilbronn Open in its industrial park, and, additionally, for the Death Pit discovered in 1983.

== Gallery ==
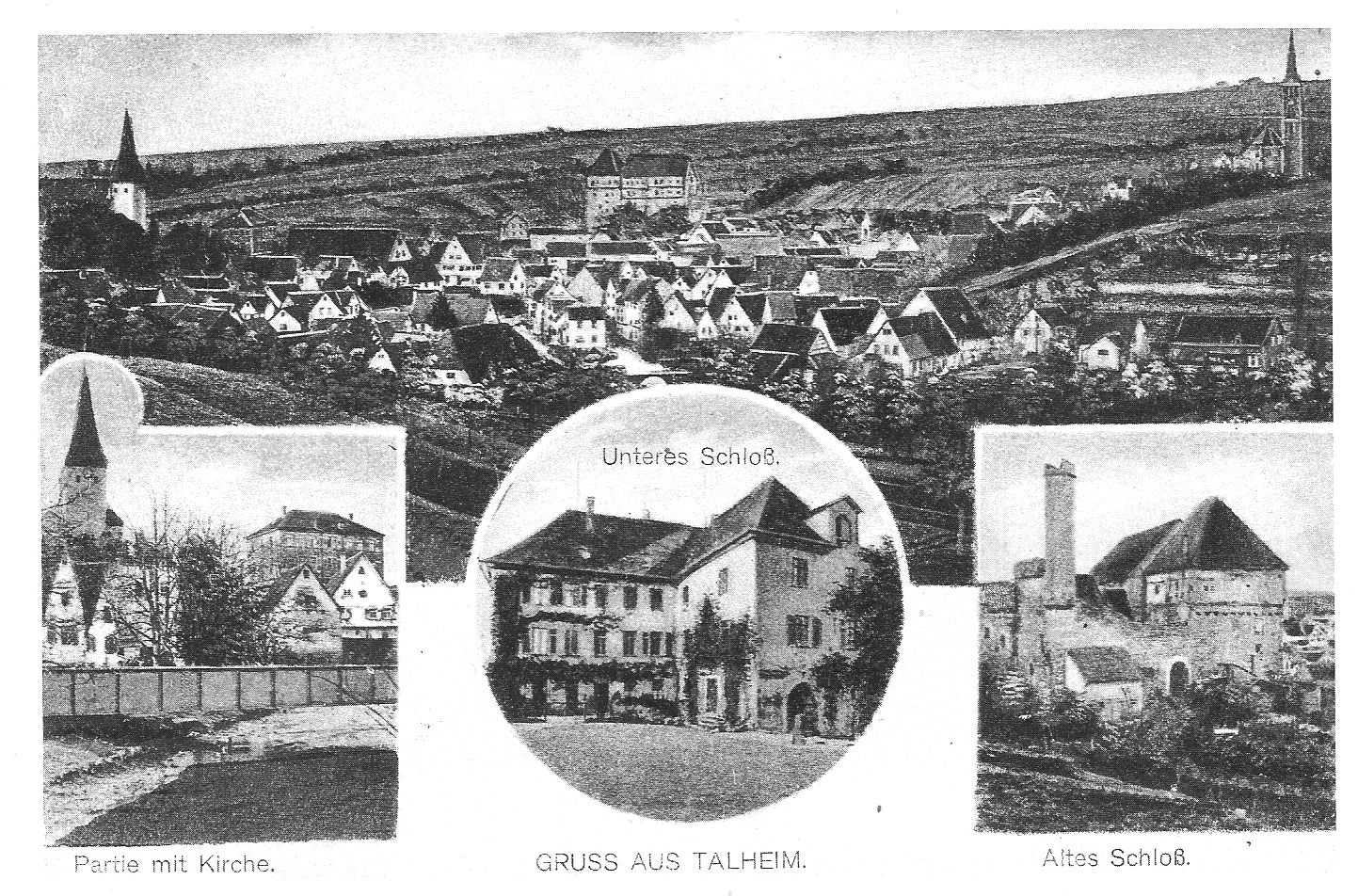

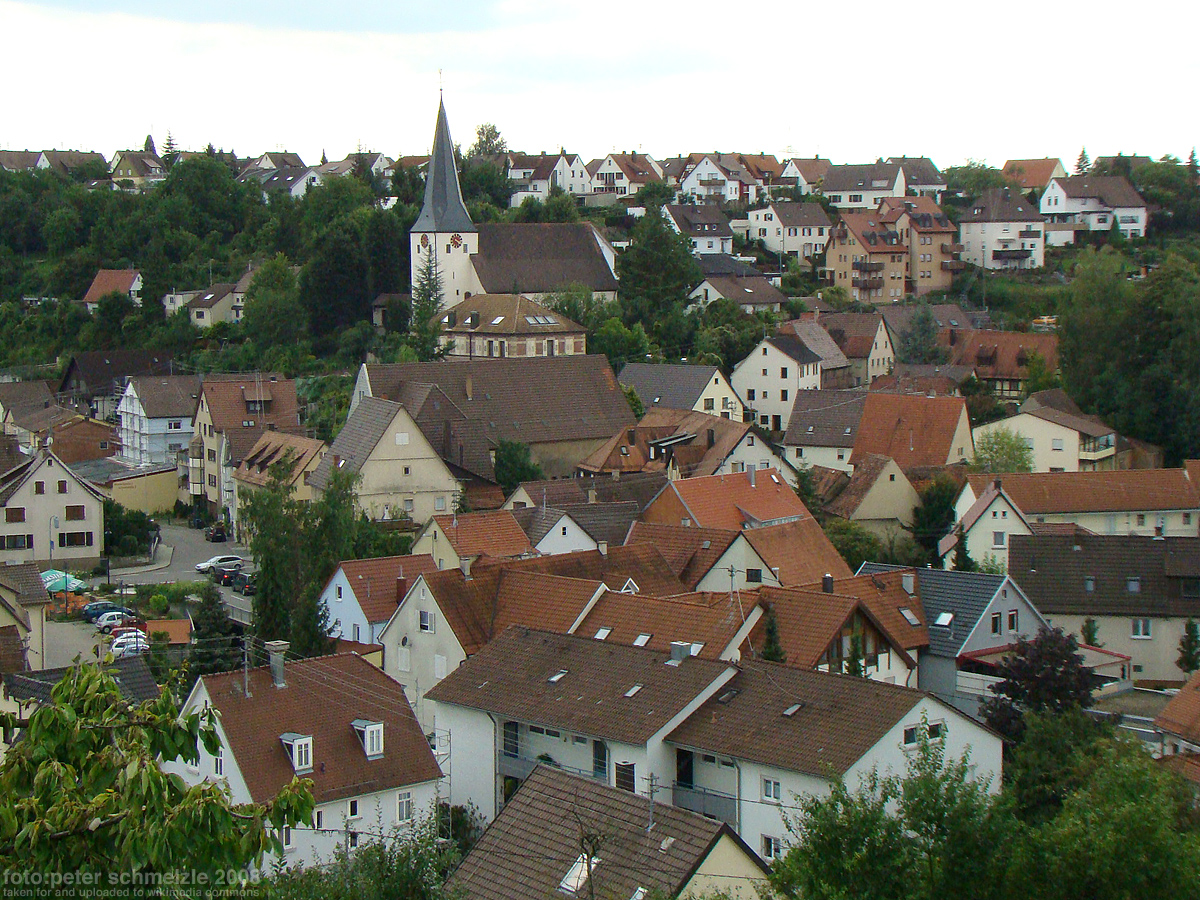

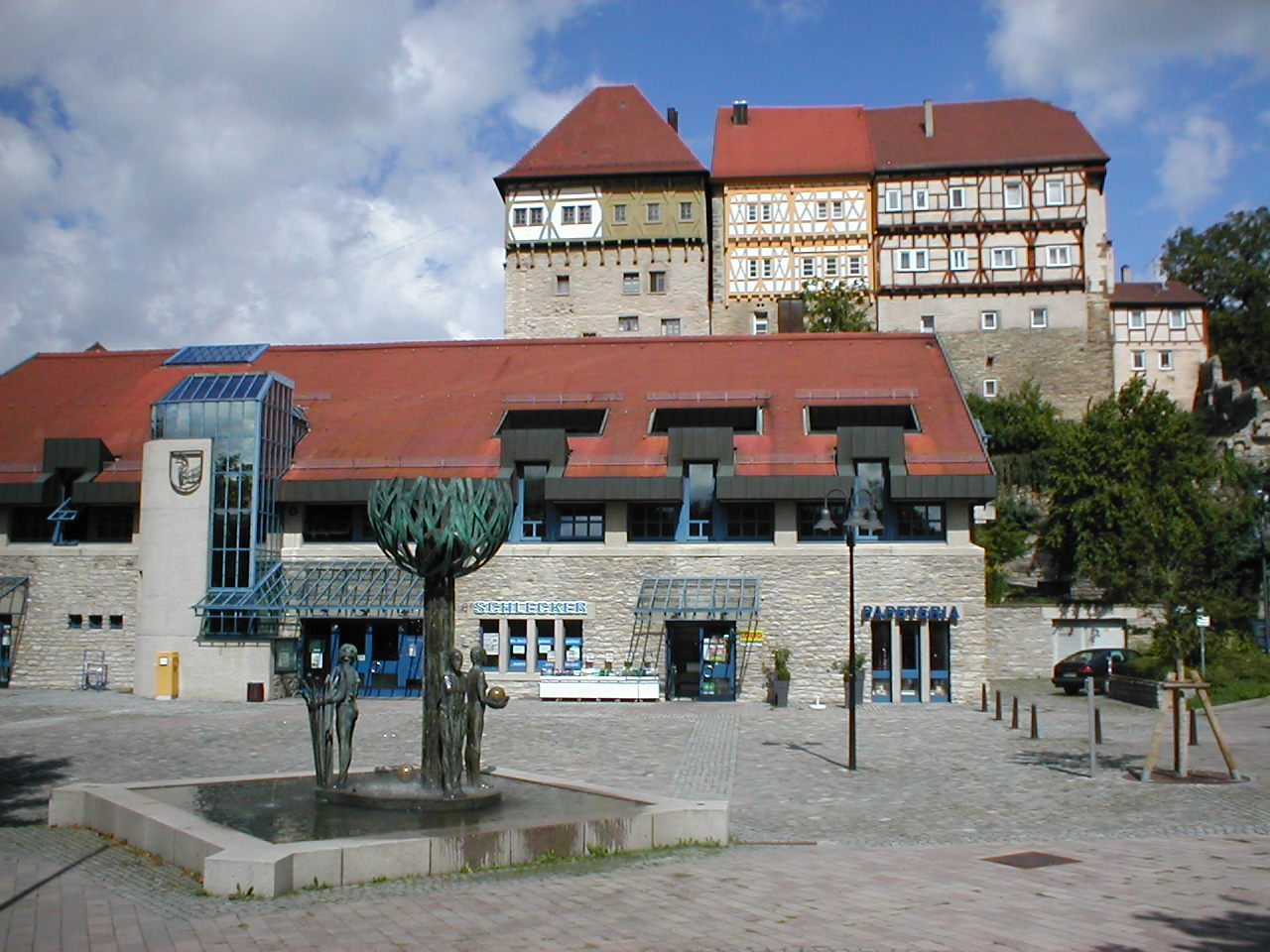

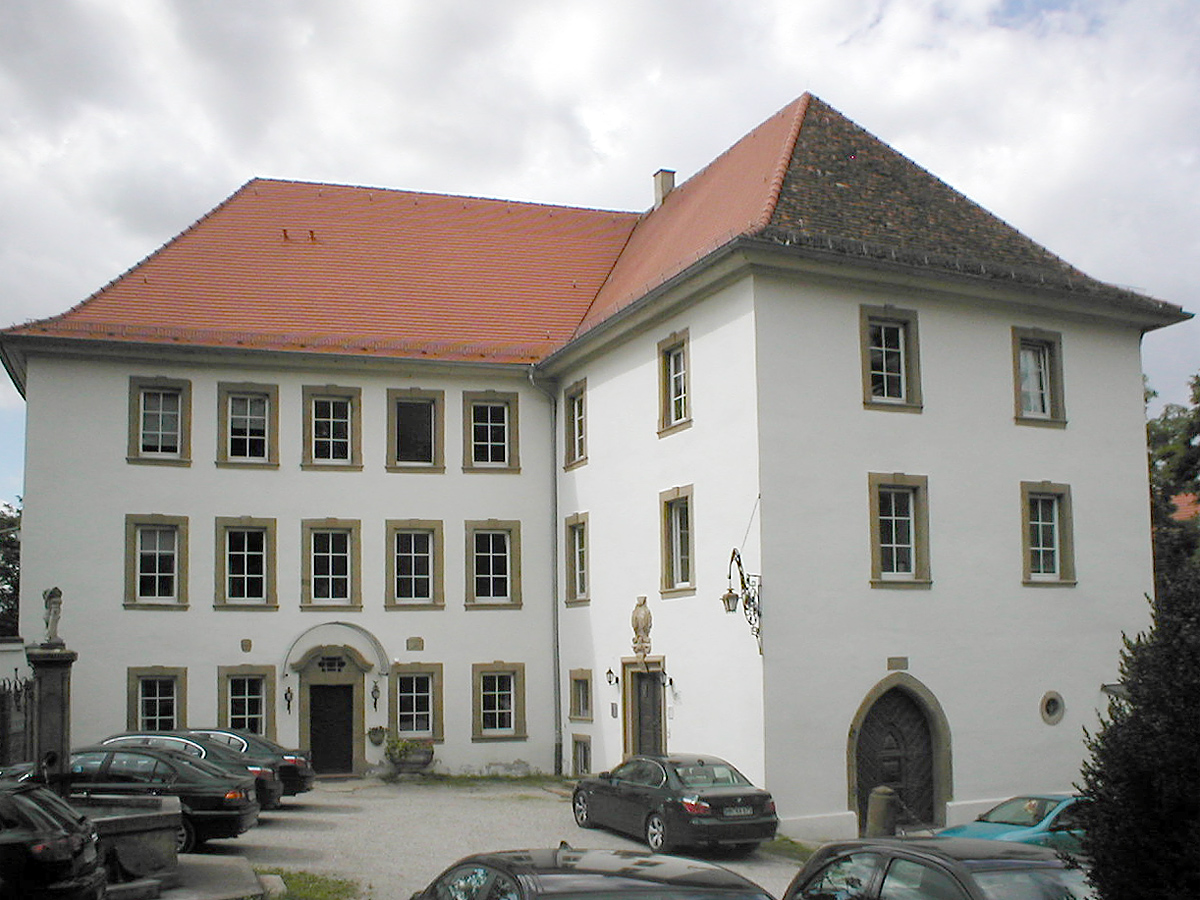

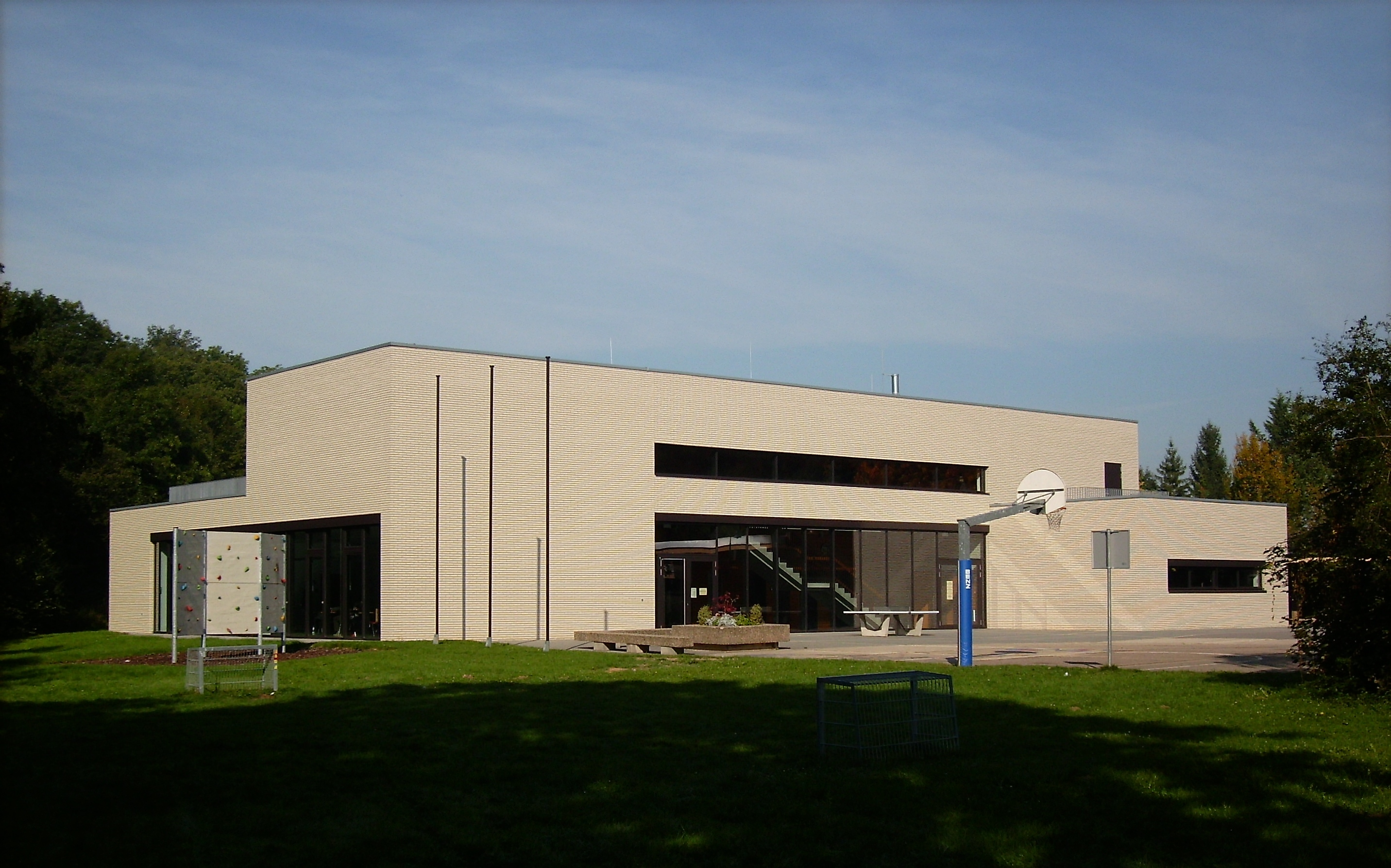

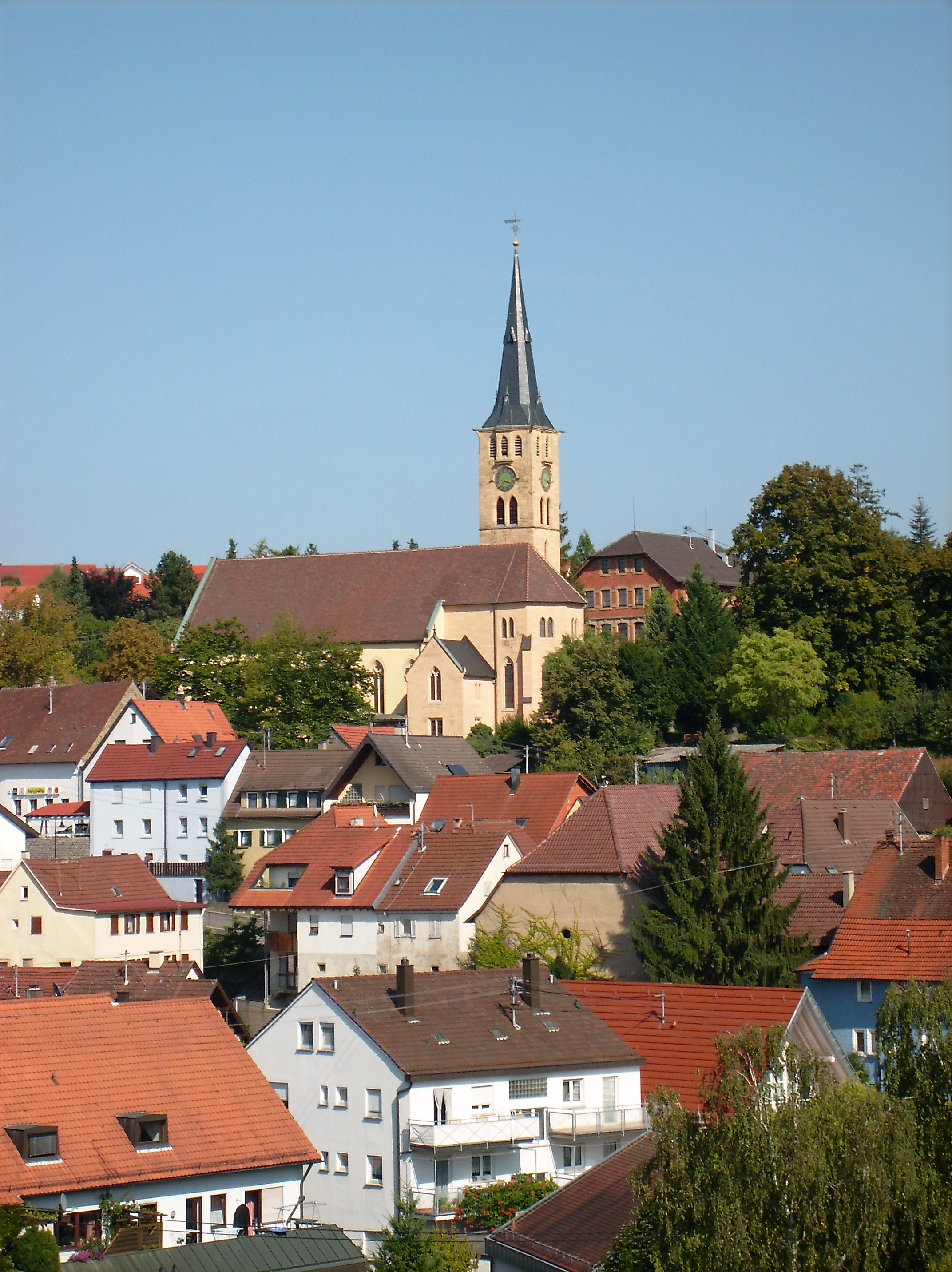

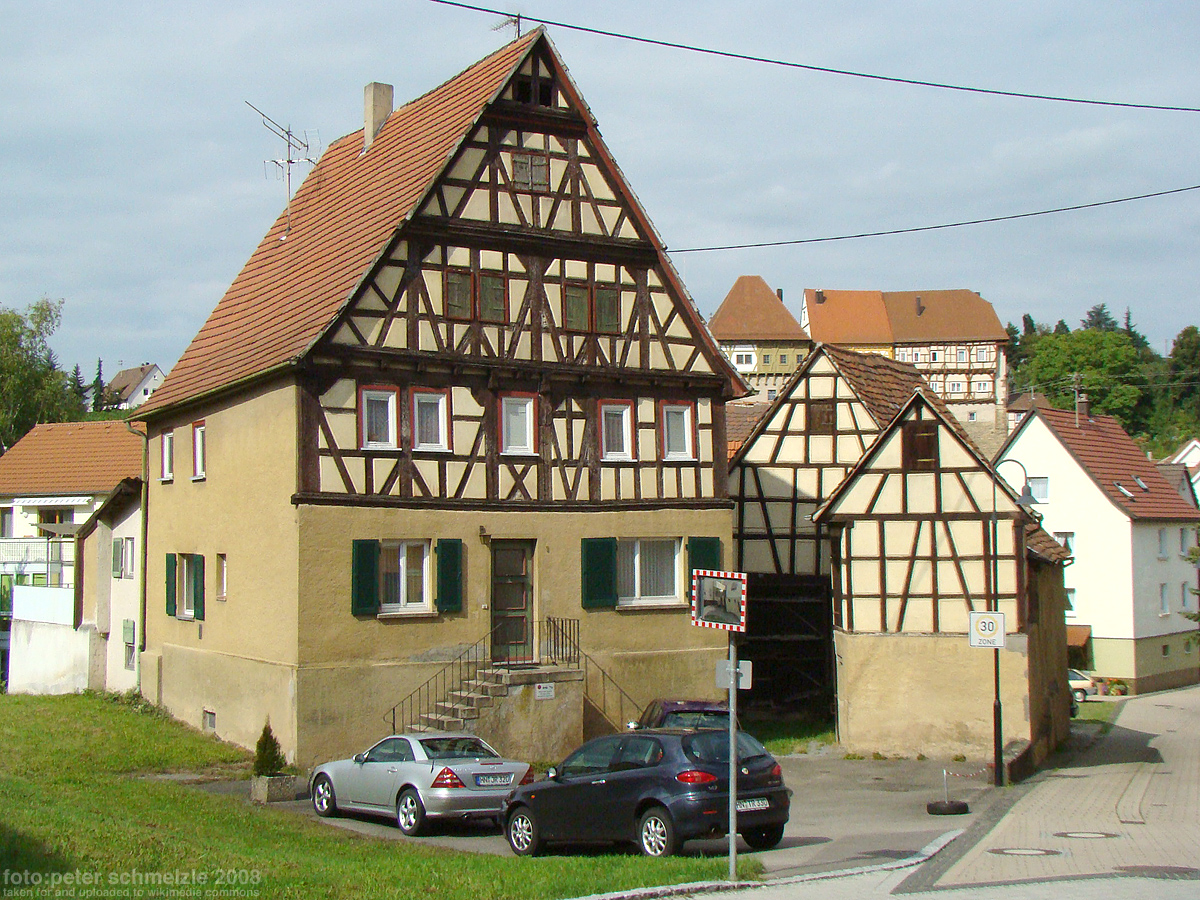

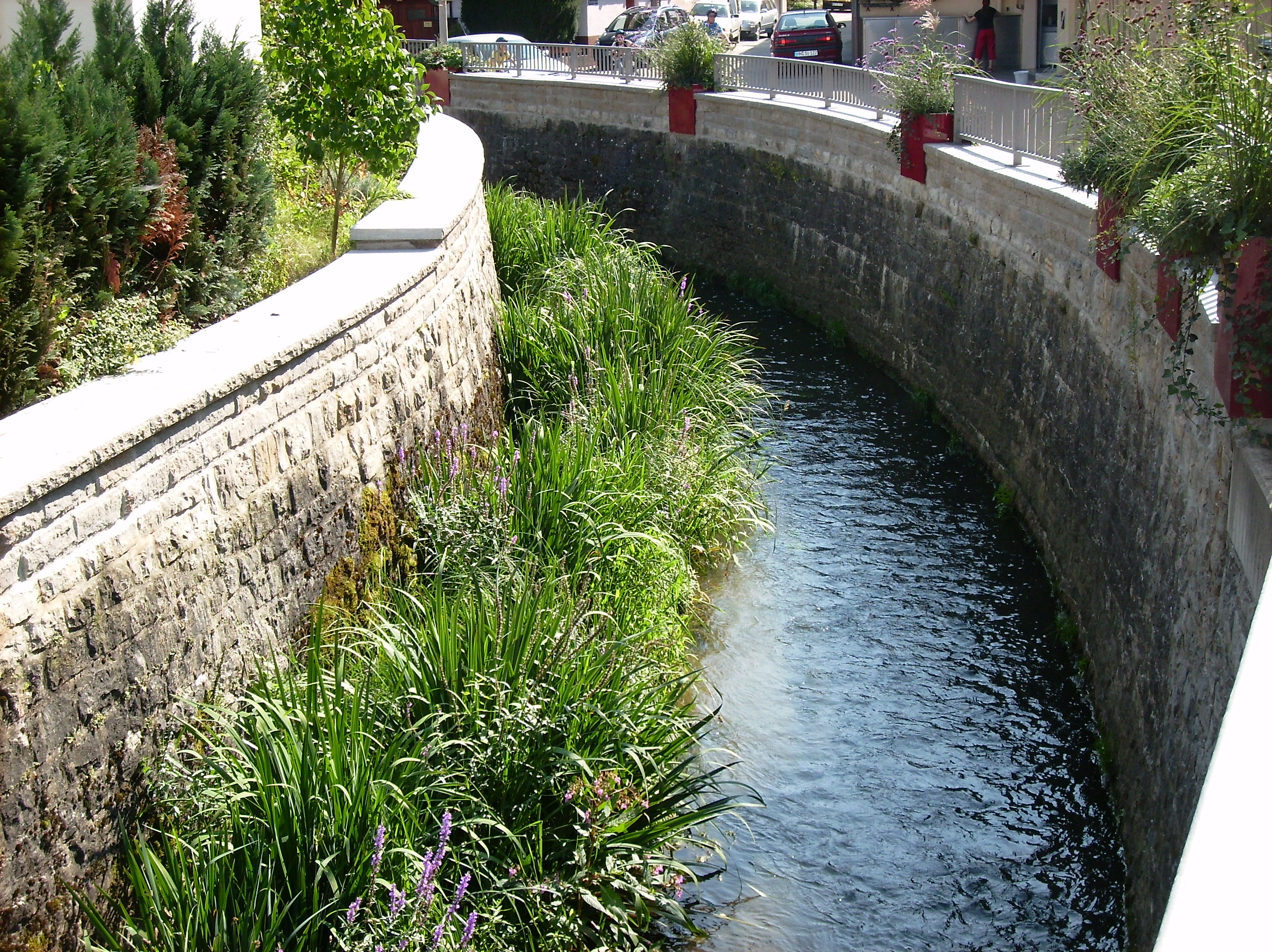
