= Benedikt Dorsch =

German tennis player

- Country (sports): (Germany)
- Residence: Seehausen, Germany
- Born: 10 January 1981 (age 44) Garmisch, Germany
- Height: 1.78 m (5 ft 10 in)
- Turned pro: 2005
- Plays: Right-handed
- Prize money: $251,123

Singles
- Career record: 0-3
- Career titles: 0
- Highest ranking: No. 127 (25 May 2009)

Grand Slam singles results
- Australian Open: Q3 (2009)
- French Open: Q2 (2006, 2007, 2008)
- Wimbledon: 1R (2006)
- US Open: Q2 (2007)

Doubles
- Career record: 0-1
- Career titles: 0
- Highest ranking: No. 189 (4 February 2008)
- Last updated on: 27 July 2022.

Benedikt Martin Dorsch (born 10 January 1981) is a professional tennis player from Germany.

== Career ==
Dorsch was at Baylor University from 2002 to 2005 and was a member of the Baylor team that claimed the national championship in 2004. A three-time singles and doubles All-American, Dorsch won the Intercollegiate Tennis Association Player of the Year award in 2004 and 2005. He was the NCAA Division 1 singles champion in his final year. The German then committed himself to the international tennis circuit.

He has only been able to qualify once for the main draw of a Grand Slam tournament once, which was at the 2006 Wimbledon Championships. In the opening round he faced former Wimbledon semi-finalist Xavier Malisse, who won in straight sets.

Despite having a win over Rainer Schüttler in the qualifying round for the 2007 Sony Ericsson Open (Miami Masters), Dorsch didn't manage to make it into the main draw. He did however feature in the doubles, with Horia Tecău. The pair lost in the opening round to Tomáš Berdych and Ivan Ljubičić, in a match decided by a super tie-break.

In 2008 he appeared in the main draw of two ATP World Tour tournaments, the Qatar Open, where he lost in the first round to top seed Nikolay Davydenko and the SAP San Jose Open, where he was beaten in the opening round by Bobby Reynolds.

He has won four Challenger titles during his career, two each in singles and doubles, as well as finishing runner-up a further 10 times, again split evenly between singles and doubles.

== ATP Challenger and ITF Futures finals ==
=== Singles: 11 (5–6) ===
Legend ATP Challenger (2–5) ITF Futures (3–1)	Finals by surface Hard (4–5) Clay (1–1) Grass (0–0) Carpet (0–0)

Result	W–L	Date	Tournament	Tier	Surface	Opponent	Score
Win	1–0	Jun 2005	Finland F2, Vierumäki	Futures	Clay	(Estonia) Mait Künnap	6–1, 6–3
Win	2–0	Sep 2005	USA F22, Claremont	Futures	Hard	(United States) Tyler Cleveland	6–2, 6–3
Loss	2–1	Oct 2005	Tulsa, United States	Challenger	Hard	(Israel) Harel Levy	7–5, 5–7, 6–7^{(6–8)}
Loss	2–2	Oct 2005	USA F26, Arlington	Futures	Hard	(United States) Michael Russell	1–6, 3–6
Win	3–2	Mar 2006	USA F6, McAllen	Futures	Hard	(Sweden) Johan Brunström	3–6, 6–2, 6–1
Loss	3–3	May 2006	Telde, Spain	Challenger	Clay	(Spain) Marc López	0–6, 1–6
Loss	3–4	Feb 2007	Dallas, United States	Challenger	Hard	(United States) Robert Kendrick	3–6, 4–6
Win	4–4	Jul 2007	Penza, Russia	Challenger	Hard	(Russia) Mikhail Ledovskikh	7–5, 5–7, 6–1
Win	5–4	Jul 2008	Penza, Russia	Challenger	Hard	(Ukraine) Sergiy Stakhovsky	1–6, 6–4, 7–6^{(8–6)}
Loss	5–5	Aug 2008	Istanbul, Turkey	Challenger	Hard	(Portugal) Fred Gil	4–6, 6–1, 3–6
Loss	5–6	Mar 2009	Bergamo, Italy	Challenger	Hard	(Czech Republic) Lukáš Rosol	1–6, 6–4, 6–7^{(3–7)}

=== Doubles: 11 (3–8) ===
Legend ATP Challenger (2–5) ITF Futures (1–3)	Finals by surface Hard (2–4) Clay (1–4) Grass (0–0) Carpet (0–0)

Result	W–L	Date	Tournament	Tier	Surface	Partner	Opponents	Score
Loss	0–1	Sep 2003	Mandeville, United States	Challenger	Hard	(Slovenia) Matija Zgaga	(France) Sébastien de Chaunac (United States) Zack Fleishman	7–6^{(7–3)}, 6–7^{(2–7)}, 3–6
Win	1–1	Jul 2004	Austria F1, Telfs	Futures	Clay	(Belgium) Stefan Wauters	(Czech Republic) Jan Mertl (Czech Republic) Jiri Vencl	6–3, 7–5
Loss	1–2	Nov 2004	Iran F4, Kish Island	Futures	Clay	(Austria) Marko Neunteibl	(Chile) Juan Ignacio Cerda (Netherlands) Jasper Smit	6–7^{(3–7)}, 6–4, 3–6
Loss	1–3	Jun 2005	Finland F2, Vierumäki	Futures	Clay	(Germany) Mischa Zverev	(Estonia) Mait Künnap (Finland) Janne Ojala	3–6, 3–6
Loss	1–4	Jul 2005	Austria F4, Telfs	Futures	Clay	(Germany) Mischa Zverev	(Germany) Bastian Knittel (Germany) Christopher Koderisch	1–2 ret.
Loss	1–5	Apr 2006	Lanzarote, Spain	Challenger	Hard	(Netherlands) Steven Korteling	(France) Gregory Carraz (France) Jean-Michel Pequery	3–6, 5–7
Loss	1–6	Apr 2007	Paget, Bermuda	Challenger	Clay	(Ukraine) Sergiy Stakhovsky	(Brazil) Marcelo Melo (Brazil) André Sá	2–6, 4–6
Win	2–6	Feb 2008	Dallas, United States	Challenger	Hard	(Germany) Björn Phau	(United States) Scott Lipsky (United States) David Martin	6–4, 6–4
Win	3–6	Jun 2008	Recanati, Italy	Challenger	Hard	(Germany) Björn Phau	(China) Yu Xinyuan (China) Zeng Shaoxuan	6–3, 7–5
Loss	3–7	Feb 2009	Heilbronn, Germany	Challenger	Hard	(Germany) Philipp Petzschner	(Slovakia) Karol Beck (Czech Republic) Jaroslav Levinský	3–6, 2–6
Loss	3–8	Feb 2009	Wrocław, Poland	Challenger	Hard	(United States) Sam Warburg	(Thailand) Sonchat Ratiwatana (Thailand) Sanchai Ratiwatana	4–6, 6–3, [8–10]

== Performance timeline ==
Key
W	F	SF	QF	#R	RR	Q#	P#	DNQ	A	Z#	PO	G	S	B	NMS	NTI	P	NH

(W) winner; (F) finalist; (SF) semifinalist; (QF) quarterfinalist; (#R) rounds 4, 3, 2, 1; (RR) round-robin stage; (Q#) qualification round; (P#) preliminary round; (DNQ) did not qualify; (A) absent; (Z#) Davis/Fed Cup Zonal Group (with number indication) or (PO) play-off; (G) gold, (S) silver or (B) bronze Olympic/Paralympic medal; (NMS) not a Masters tournament; (NTI) not a Tier I tournament; (P) postponed; (NH) not held; (SR) strike rate (events won / competed); (W–L) win–loss record.

=== Singles ===
Tournament	2006	2007	2008	2009	2010	2011	SR	W–L	Win%
Grand Slam tournaments
Australian Open	Q1	A	Q1	Q3	A	A	0 / 0	0–0	–
French Open	Q2	Q2	Q2	A	Q1	A	0 / 0	0–0	–
Wimbledon	1R	Q1	A	A	A	Q1	0 / 1	0–1	0%
US Open	Q1	Q2	Q1	A	A	A	0 / 0	0–0	–
Win–loss	0–1	0–0	0–0	0–0	0–0	0–0	0 / 1	0–1	0%
ATP Tour Masters 1000
Miami	A	Q2	A	Q1	A	A	0 / 0	0–0	–
Win–loss	0–0	0–0	0–0	0–0	0–0	0–0	0 / 0	0–0	–
