= Sander Groen =

Dutch tennis player

- Country (sports): Netherlands
- Born: 16 June 1968 (age 57) Amsterdam, Netherlands
- Height: 1.90 m (6 ft 3 in)
- Turned pro: 1989
- Retired: 2019 (last match)
- Plays: Left-handed
- Prize money: $ 503,164

Singles
- Career record: 3–9
- Career titles: 0
- Highest ranking: No. 385 (4 March 1996)

Grand Slam singles results
- French Open: Q3 (1991)
- Wimbledon: Q3 (1990)

Doubles
- Career record: 47–98
- Career titles: 1
- Highest ranking: No. 61 (20 October 1997)

Grand Slam doubles results
- Australian Open: 1R (1998, 1999, 2001)
- French Open: 3R (1997)
- Wimbledon: 3R (1997)
- US Open: 1R (1993, 1997)

Mixed doubles
- Career record: 0–2
- Career titles: 0

Grand Slam mixed doubles results
- French Open: 1R (1997)
- Wimbledon: 1R (1997)

Sander Groen (born 16 June 1968) is a former onprofessional tennis player from the Netherlands.

Groen enjoyed most of his tennis success while playing doubles. During his career he won 1 ATP doubles title and 12 Challenger doubles titles. He achieved a career-high doubles ranking of World No. 89 in 1997 and a career-high singles ranking of World No. 177 in 1996.

Groen is known for being the doubles partner of many top-5 singles players like Pat Cash, Goran Ivanišević, Gustavo Kuerten, Marcelo Ríos, Marat Safin, Magnus Norman, Greg Rusedski, Alex Corretja, Marc Rosset and Roger Federer. Federer won his first-ever professional title on the tour playing together with Groen in Segovia 1999. Groen recorded doubles wins over Federer, Safin, Rios, Patrick Rafter and world number 1 teams Eltingh/ Haarhuis (with Fredrik Bergh), Bhupathi/ Paes (with Jan Siemerink and with Andrei Pavel) and Knowles/ Nestor (with Laurence Tieleman) In singles Groen qualified for 9 ATP Tour events reaching the second round in 3 events and he recorded wins over Tim Henman, Richard Krajicek Felix Mantilla and Andrei Chesnokov. He won the dutch national masters in 1992 beating Fernon Wibier in the finals and was runner-up to Jan Siemerink in 1994.

In 2004 Sander Groen made his mark on the ITF senior tour by winning the men's singles over 35 world championships followed by finishing runner-up in 2005 and 2006. He also won the men's singles over 35 European championships in 2005. Up to 2016 Groen won 1 medals at ITF seniors world championships.

== Doubles titles (13) ==
Legend (singles)
Grand Slam (0)
Tennis Masters Cup (0)
ATP Masters Series (0)
ATP Tour (1)
Challengers (12)

| No. | Date | Tournament | Surface | Partner | Opponents | Score |
|---|---|---|---|---|---|---|
| 1. | 1991 | Cherbourg, France | Hard (i) | (South Africa) Byron Talbot | (Israel) Michael Daniel (United States) Brian Devening | 3–6, 6–3, 7–5 |
| 2. | 1992 | Meran, Italy | Clay | (Germany) David Prinosil | (France) Lionel Barthez (France) Aloïs Beust | 6–4, 6–4 |
| 3. | 1992 | Dublin, Ireland | Hard | (Germany) Arne Thoms | (Sweden) Douglas Geiwald (South Africa) Robbie Koenig | 5–7, 6–4, 6–3 |
| 4. | 1992 | Munich, Germany | Carpet | (Germany) Arne Thoms | (South Africa) Marcos Ondruska (South Africa) Grant Stafford | 6–4, 7–6 |
| 5. | 1993 | Munich, Germany | Carpet | (Germany) Arne Thoms | (Australia) Jon Ireland (United States) John Yancey | 6–3, 6–3 |
| 6. | 1994 | Singapore | Hard | (United States) Brian Devening | (Mexico) Leonardo Lavalle (Brazil) Danilo Marcelino | 6–2, 7–6 |
| 7. | 1997 | Dubai, UAE | Hard | (Croatia) Goran Ivanišević | (Australia) Sandon Stolle (Czech Republic) Cyril Suk | 7–6, 6–3 |
| 8. | 1998 | Dresden, Germany | Clay | (Argentina) Pablo Albano | (Australia) Jamie Holmes (Australia) Andrew Painter | 6–4, 6–3 |
| 9. | 1998 | Guadalajara, Mexico | Clay | (Lebanon) Ali Hamadeh | (Argentina) Martín García (Argentina) Sebastián Prieto | 6–4, 6–2 |
| 10. | 1999 | Segovia, Spain | Clay | (Switzerland) Roger Federer | (Czech Republic) Ota Fukárek (Mexico) Alejandro Hernández | 6–4, 7–6 |
| 11. | 2000 | Aachen, Germany | Carpet | (Netherlands) Jan Siemerink | (Germany) Michael Kohlmann (Germany) Franz Stauder | 6–7, 7–6, 6–3 |
| 12. | 2001 | Heilbronn, Germany | Carpet | (United States) Jack Waite | (Czech Republic) Petr Luxa (Czech Republic) David Škoch | 1–6, 6–3, 7–6 |
| 13. | 2001 | Prostějov, Czech Republic | Clay | (Italy) Andrea Gaudenzi | (United States) Devin Bowen (Argentina) Mariano Hood | 7–6, 6–4 |

=== Runners-up (15) ===
| No. | Date | Tournament | Surface | Partner | Opponents | Score |
|---|---|---|---|---|---|---|
| 1. | 1992 | Heilbronn, Germany | Carpet | (Sweden) Tomas Nydahl | (United States) Doug Eisenman (Norway) Bent-Ove Pedersen | 1–6, 3–6 |
| 2. | 1992 | Umag, Croatia | Clay | (Germany) Lars Koslowski | (Germany) David Prinosil (Czech Republic) Richard Vogel | 3–6, 7–6, 6–7 |
| 3. | 1992 | Singapore | Hard | (Germany) Patrick Baur | (United States) Martin Blackman (Italy) Laurence Tieleman | 4–6, 6–1, 6–7 |
| 4. | 1993 | Bergamo, Italy | Hard (i) | (Germany) Arne Thoms | (Italy) Cristian Brandi (Italy) Cristiano Caratti | 6–4, 4–6, 1–6 |
| 5. | 1993 | Riemerling, Germany | Clay | (Germany) Arne Thoms | (Venezuela) Maurice Ruah (Cuba) Mario Tabares | 3–6, 3–6 |
| 6. | 1993 | Singapore | Hard | (South Africa) Grant Stafford | (United Kingdom) Jeremy Bates (South Africa) Christo van Rensburg | 3–6, 4–6 |
| 7. | 1995 | Bristol, England | Grass | (Germany) Arne Thoms | (France) Lionel Barthez (France) Stephane Simian | 5–7, 5–7 |
| 8. | 1996 | Madras, India | Hard | (Uzbekistan) Oleg Ogorodov | (India) Mahesh Bhupathi (India) Leander Paes | 5–7, 1–6 |
| 9. | 1996 | Mauritius Island | Grass | (Romania) Andrei Pavel | (Germany) Patrick Baur (Netherlands) Joost Winnink | 1–0, RET. |
| 10. | 1997 | Eilat, Israel | Hard (i) | (Netherlands) Rogier Wassen | (Germany) Patrick Baur (Russia) Andrei Cherkasov | 3–6, 6–7 |
| 11. | 1998 | Venice, Italy | Clay | (Italy) Massimo Bertolini | (Serbia and Montenegro) Nebojsa Djordjevic (South Africa) Marcos Ondruska | 6–1, 1–6, 2–6 |
| 12. | 2001 | Istanbul, Turkey | Hard | (Germany) Michael Kohlmann | (Israel) Jonathan Erlich (France) Michaël Llodra | W/O |
| 13. | 2002 | Segovia, Spain | Hard | (Slovakia) Karol Beck | (Australia) Tim Crichton (Australia) Todd Perry | 7–5, 6–7, 4–6 |
| 14. | 2006 | Eckental, Germany | Carpet | (Germany) Torsten Popp | (United Kingdom) Joshua Goodall (United Kingdom) Ross Hutchins | 5–7, 3–6 |
| 15. | 2007 | Heilbronn, Germany | Hard (i) | (France) Michaël Llodra | (Germany) Michael Kohlmann (Germany) Rainer Schüttler | W/O |
