= Bastian Knittel =

German tennis player

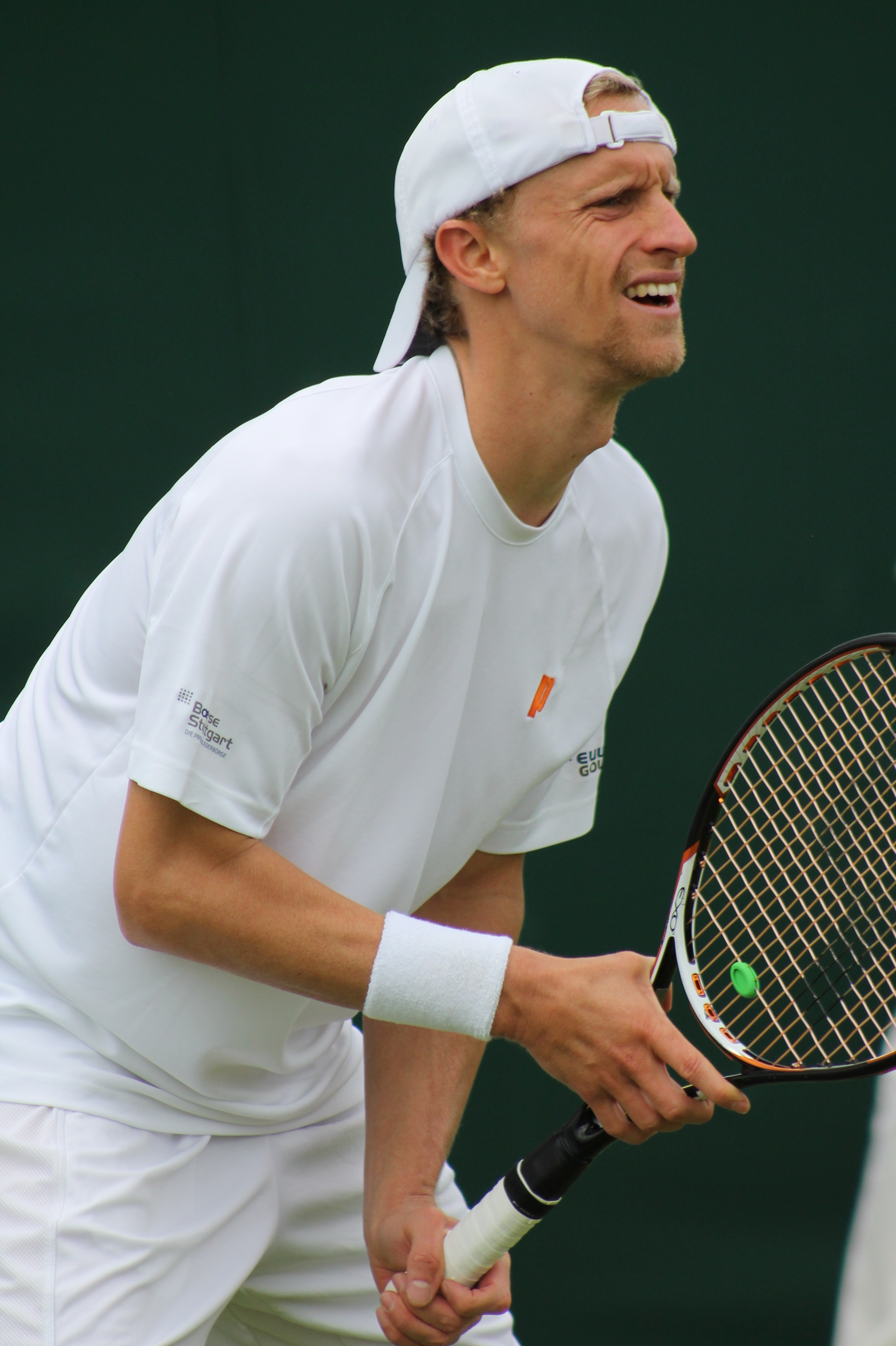
- Bastian Knittel at the 2013 Wimbledon Championships
- Country (sports): Germany
- Residence: Germany
- Born: 8 August 1983 (age 42) Stuttgart, Germany
- Turned pro: 2003
- Plays: Left-handed (one-handed backhand)
- Prize money: $287,072

Singles
- Career record: 1–4
- Career titles: 0
- Highest ranking: No. 157 (28 February 2011)

Grand Slam singles results
- Australian Open: Q2 (2011)
- French Open: Q3 (2011)
- Wimbledon: 1R (2013)
- US Open: Q2 (2010, 2011)

Doubles
- Career record: 1–1
- Career titles: 0
- Highest ranking: No. 201 (26 September 2011)

Bastian Knittel (German pronunciation: [ˈbasti̯aːn ˈknɪtl̩]; born 8 August 1983) is a German tennis player playing on the ATP Challenger Tour. He reached his career-high ATP singles ranking of world No. 157 in February 2011.

== Challenger finals ==
=== Singles: 2 (1–1) ===
Legend
ATP Challenger Tour (1–1)

Result	No.	Date	Tournament	Surface	Opponent	Score
Loss	1.	18 Apr 2010	Blumenau, Brazil	Clay	(Brazil) Marcos Daniel	5–7, 7–6^{(7–5)}, 4–6
Win	2.	30 Jan 2011	Heilbronn, Germany	Hard (i)	(Germany) Daniel Brands	7–6^{(7–4)}, 7–6^{(7–5)}

=== Doubles: 4 (2–2) ===
Legend
ATP Challenger Tour (2–2)

Result	No.	Date	Tournament	Surface	Partner	Opponents	Score
Win	1.	6 May 2007	Ostrava, Czech Republic	Clay	(Czech Republic) Lukáš Rosol	(Russia) Alexandre Krasnoroutskiy (Russia) Alexandre Kudryavtsev	2–6, 7–5, 11–9
Loss	2.	3 Oct 2010	Naples, Italy	Clay	(Austria) Andreas Haider-Maurer	(Spain) Daniel Muñoz-de la Nava (Italy) Simone Vagnozzi	6–1, ^{(5–7)}6–7, [6–10]
Win	3.	12 Jun 2011	Košice, Slovakia	Clay	(Germany) Simon Greul	(Argentina) Facundo Bagnis (Argentina) Eduardo Schwank	2–6, 6–3, [11–9]
Loss	4.	9 Sep 2012	Alphen aan den Rijn, Netherlands	Clay	(Germany) Simon Greul	(Australia) Rameez Junaid (Germany) Simon Stadler	6–4, 1–6, [5–10]
