= Intersport Heilbronn Open =

Tennis tournament in Talheim, Germany

Defunct tennis tournament
- Event name: Talheim
- Founded: 1998
- Abolished: 2014
- Editions: 17
- Location: Talheim, Germany
- Category: ATP Challenger Tour
- Surface: Hard (indoor)
- Draw: 32S/32Q/16D

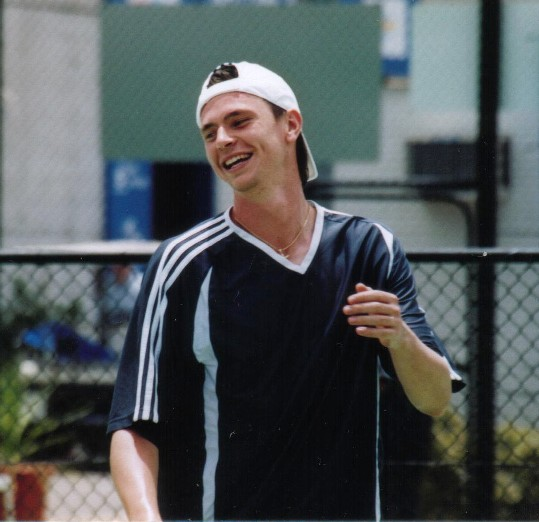
Swede Robin Söderling clinched the title in 2006, beating Czech Tomáš Zíb in the final.

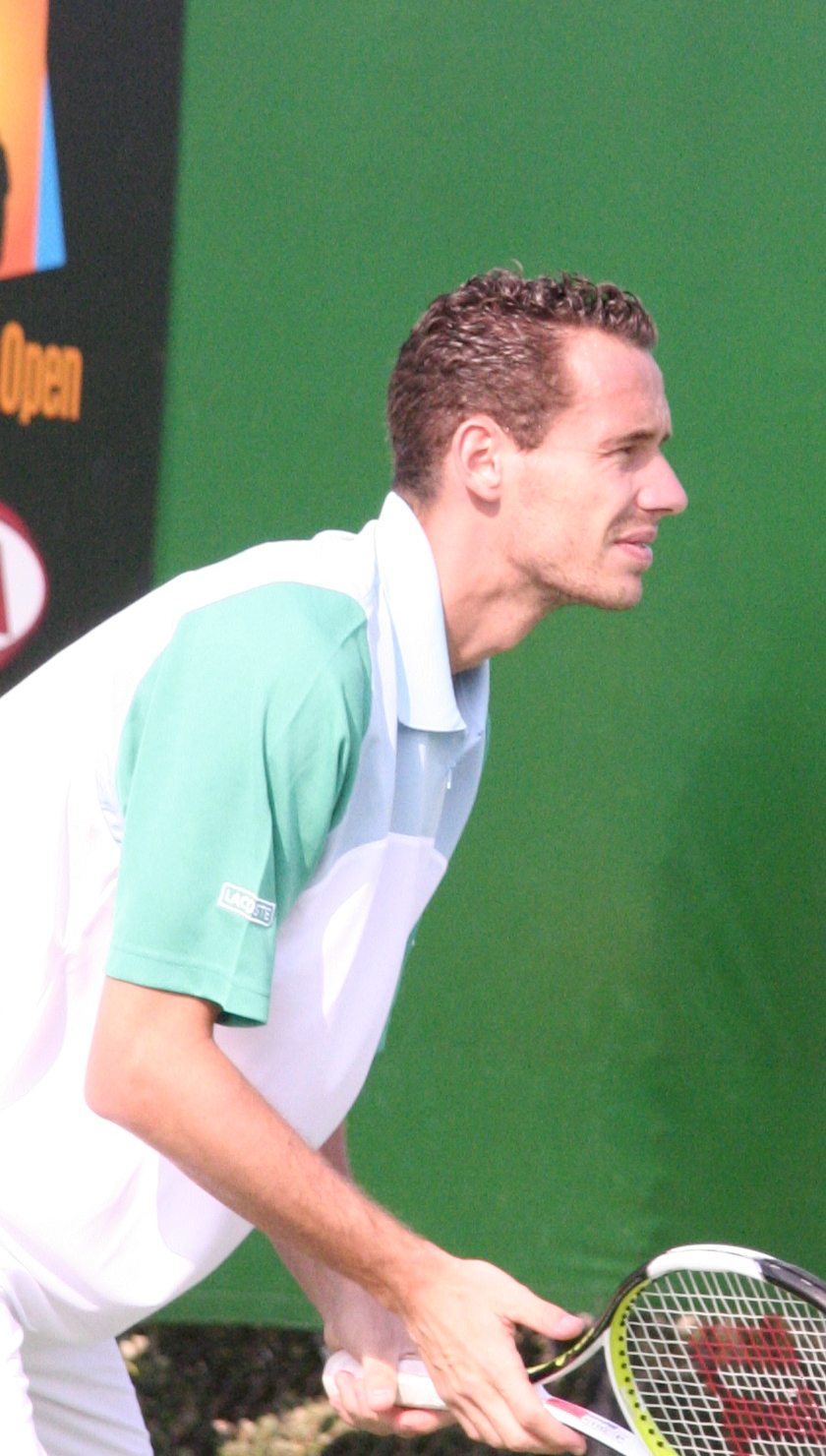
Frenchman Michaël Llodra reached two singles finals at the tournament, beating Goran Ivanišević in 2001, and losing to Michael Berrer in 2007.

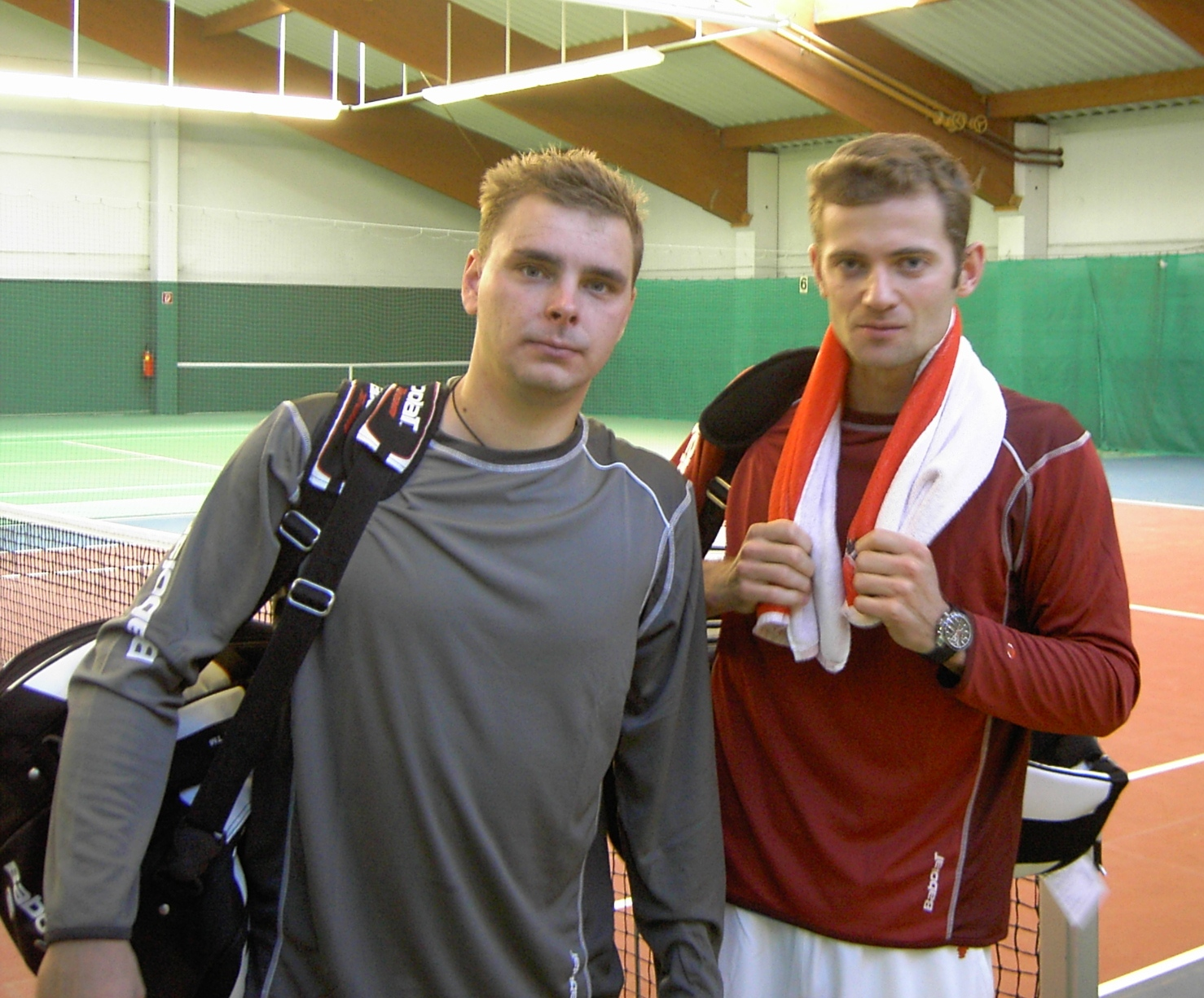
Pole team of Mariusz Fyrstenberg and Marcin Matkowski won the doubles title in Talheim in 2004.

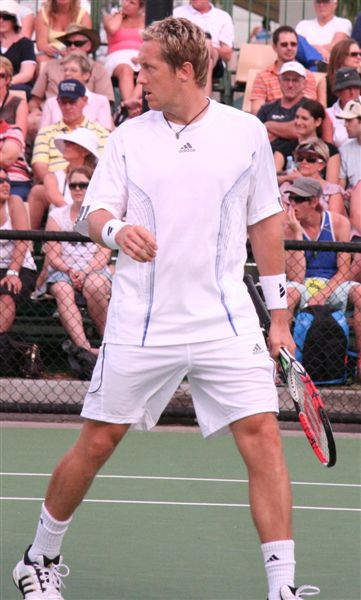
Jonas Björkman partnered countryman Jan Apell to win the doubles in 1993 against Peter Nyborg and Brian Devening.

The Intersport Heilbronn Open was a professional tennis tournament played on indoor hardcourts. It has been part of the ATP Challenger Tour until 2014. It was held annually in Talheim, Germany, since 1984.

== Past finals ==
=== Singles ===
Year	Champions	Runners-up	Score
2014	(Germany) Peter Gojowczyk	(Netherlands) Igor Sijsling	6–4, 7–5
2013	(Germany) Michael Berrer	(Germany) Jan-Lennard Struff	7–5, 6–3
2012	(Germany) Björn Phau	(Belgium) Ruben Bemelmans	6–7^{(4–7)}, 6–3, 6–4
2011	(Germany) Bastian Knittel	(Germany) Daniel Brands	7–6(4), 7–6(5)
2010	(Germany) Michael Berrer	(Kazakhstan) Andrey Golubev	6–3, 7–6(4)
2009	(Germany) Benjamin Becker	(Slovakia) Karol Beck	6–4, 6–4
2008	(Kazakhstan) Andrey Golubev	(Germany) Philipp Petzschner	2–6, 6–1, 3–1 retired
2007	(Germany) Michael Berrer	(France) Michaël Llodra	6–5 retired
2006	(Sweden) Robin Söderling	(Czech Republic) Tomáš Zíb	6–1, 6–4
2005	(Czech Republic) Jiří Vaněk	(Germany) Lars Burgsmüller	6–2, 6–4
2004	(Belgium) Gilles Elseneer	(Germany) Lars Burgsmüller	3–6, 6–3, 7–6(5)
2003	(Slovakia) Karol Beck	(Austria) Jürgen Melzer	6–2, 5–7, 7–6(5)
2002	(Germany) Alexander Popp	(Austria) Jürgen Melzer	3–6, 6–3, 6–4
2001	(France) Michaël Llodra	(Croatia) Goran Ivanišević	6–3, 6–4
2000	(Sweden) Magnus Larsson	(France) Stéphane Huet	6–3, 7–6()
1999	(Italy) Laurence Tieleman	(Germany) Markus Hantschk	6–2, 5–7, 6–3
1998	(Germany) Martin Sinner	(Italy) Gianluca Pozzi	6–0, 3–6, 6–3
1997	(Sweden) Henrik Holm	(Germany) Hendrik Dreekmann	6–3, 2–6, 6–0
1996	(United States) Chris Woodruff	(Italy) Gianluca Pozzi	6–3, 6–3
1995	(Czech Republic) David Rikl	(Denmark) Frederik Fetterlein	7–5, 6–3
1994	(Germany) Markus Zoecke	(Italy) Cristiano Caratti	6–3, 6–4
1993	(Germany) David Prinosil	(Czech Republic) Martin Damm	6–3, 7–6
1992	(Germany) Karsten Braasch	(Germany) Markus Naewie	6–7, 6–2, 6–2
1991	(Italy) Diego Nargiso	(Germany) Markus Zoecke	3–6, 7–6, 6–3
1990	(Czech Republic) Milan Šrejber	(Germany) Alexander Mronz	7–6, 4–6, 7–6
1989	(Germany) Michael Stich	(Denmark) Michael Tauson	6–3, 6–2
1988	(Germany) Udo Riglewski	(Germany) Michael Kupferschmid	6–3, 6–7, 6–4

=== Doubles ===
Year	Champions	Runners-up	Score
2014	(Poland) Tomasz Bednarek (Finland) Henri Kontinen	(United Kingdom) Ken Skupski (United Kingdom) Neal Skupski	3–6, 7–6^{(7–3)}, [12–10]
2013	(Sweden) Johan Brunström (South Africa) Raven Klaasen	(Australia) Jordan Kerr (Sweden) Andreas Siljeström	6–3, 0–6, [12–10]
2012	(Sweden) Johan Brunström (Denmark) Frederik Nielsen	(Philippines) Treat Conrad Huey (United Kingdom) Dominic Inglot	6–3, 3–6, [10–6]
2011	(United Kingdom) Jamie Delgado (United Kingdom) Jonathan Marray	(Germany) Frank Moser (Czech Republic) David Škoch	6–1, 6–4
2010	(Thailand) Sanchai Ratiwatana (Thailand) Sonchat Ratiwatana	(Croatia) Mario Ančić (Croatia) Lovro Zovko	6–4, 7–5
2009	(Slovakia) Karol Beck (Czech Republic) Jaroslav Levinský	(Germany) Benedikt Dorsch (Germany) Philipp Petzschner	6–3, 6–2
2008	(South Africa) Rik de Voest (United States) Bobby Reynolds	(Russia) Igor Kunitsyn (Pakistan) Aisam-ul-Haq Qureshi	7–6(2), 6–7(5), 10–4
2007	(Germany) Michael Kohlmann (Germany) Rainer Schüttler	(Netherlands) Sander Groen (France) Michaël Llodra	walkover
2006	(Germany) Christopher Kas (Germany) Philipp Petzschner	(Czech Republic) Lukáš Dlouhý (Czech Republic) David Škoch	6–7(2), 6–3, 10–4
2005	(France) Sébastien de Chaunac (Slovakia) Michal Mertiňák	(Belgium) Gilles Elseneer (Luxembourg) Gilles Müller	6–2, 3–6, 6–3
2004	(Poland) Mariusz Fyrstenberg (Poland) Marcin Matkowski	(Germany) Lars Burgsmüller (Denmark) Kenneth Carlsen	6–3, 6–3
2003	(Sweden) Simon Aspelin (Sweden) Johan Landsberg	(Czech Republic) Petr Pála (Czech Republic) Pavel Vízner	6–4, 6–4
2002	(North Macedonia) Aleksandar Kitinov (Sweden) Johan Landsberg	(Czech Republic) František Čermák (Czech Republic) Ota Fukárek	6–7(5), 6–3, 6–1
2001	(Netherlands) Sander Groen (United States) Jack Waite	(Czech Republic) Petr Luxa (Czech Republic) David Rikl	1–6, 6–3, 7–6(4)
2000	(Netherlands) Jan Siemerink (Netherlands) John van Lottum	(Sweden) Magnus Larsson (Sweden) Fredrik Lovén	7–5, 7–6
1999	(Germany) Michael Kohlmann (Switzerland) Filippo Veglio	(United States) Justin Gimelstob (United States) Chris Woodruff	6–4, 6–7, 7–5
1998	(United States) Geoff Grant (United States) Mark Merklein	(Italy) Stefano Pescosolido (Italy) Vincenzo Santopadre	6–3, 7–6
1997	(France) Olivier Delaître (France) Stéphane Simian	(Germany) Patrick Baur (South Africa) Clinton Ferreira	6–7, 6–3, 7–6
1996	(Switzerland) Lorenzo Manta (Czech Republic) Pavel Vízner	(Italy) Diego Nargiso (Germany) Udo Riglewski	6–3, 7–6
1995	(Croatia) Saša Hiršzon (Croatia) Goran Ivanišević	(Germany) Martin Sinner (Netherlands) Joost Winnink	6–4, 6–4
1994	(Latvia) Ģirts Dzelde (Germany) Mathias Huning	(Italy) Omar Camporese (Italy) Cristiano Caratti	6–4, 6–2
1993	(Sweden) Jan Apell (Sweden) Jonas Björkman	(United States) Brian Devening (Sweden) Peter Nyborg	6–2, 7–6
1992	(United States) Doug Eisenman (Norway) Bent-Ove Pedersen	(Netherlands) Sander Groen (Sweden) Tomas Nydahl	6–1, 6–3
1991	(Italy) Diego Nargiso (Italy) Stefano Pescosolido	(Germany) Christian Saceanu (Netherlands) Michiel Schapers	6–2, 6–2
1990	(Czech Republic) David Rikl (Czech Republic) Tomáš Anzari	(South Africa) Byron Talbot (Sweden) Jörgen Windahl	6–4, 6–4
1989	(Germany) Martin Sinner (Germany) Michael Stich	(Romania) Gheorghe Cosac (Romania) Adrian Marcu	4–6, 6–4, 7–6
1988	(Germany) Jaromir Becka (Germany) Udo Riglewski	(Germany) Axel Hornung (Germany) Andreas Lesch	7–6, 4–6, 6–2
