= 2010 Oberstaufen Cup – Singles =

Singles
- 2010 Oberstaufen Cup

Final
- Champion: (Austria) Martin Fischer
- Runner-up: (Germany) Cedrik-Marcel Stebe
- Score: 6–3, 6–4

Events
Singles	Doubles
← 2009 ·	Oberstaufen Cup	· 2011 →

Robin Vik was the champion in 2009 but lost to Simon Greul in the second round.
Martin Fischer defeated Cedrik-Marcel Stebe in the final 6–3, 6–4.

== Seeds ==
1. (Germany) Simon Greul (semifinals)
2. (Germany) Andreas Beck (second round)
3. (Kazakhstan) Mikhail Kukushkin (withdrew due to left knee injury)
4. (Austria) Stefan Koubek (first round)
5. (Germany) Julian Reister (semifinals)
6. (Spain) Pablo Andújar (second round)
7. (Germany) Mischa Zverev (quarterfinals)
8. (Germany) Dieter Kindlmann (first round)

== Draw ==
=== Key ===
- Q = Qualifier
- WC = Wild card
- LL = Lucky loser
- Alt = Alternate
- SE = Special exempt
- PR = Protected ranking
- ITF = ITF entry
- JE = Junior exempt
- w/o = Walkover
- r = Retired
- d = Defaulted
- SR = Special ranking

=== Finals ===
Semifinals
1	(Germany) Simon Greul	5	6^{2}
Q	(Germany) Cedrik-Marcel Stebe	7	7
(Austria) Martin Fischer	6	6
5	(Germany) Julian Reister	3	3

Final
Q	(Germany) Cedrik-Marcel Stebe	3	4
(Austria) Martin Fischer	6	6

=== Top half ===
First round
1	(Germany) S Greul	5	6	7
(Germany) B Knittel	7	1	6^{4}
Q	(Czech Republic) R Vik	3	6	6
(Spain) G Olaso	6	3	2
(Romania) C Gârd	6^{4}	7	4
WC	(Germany) K Krawietz	7	5	6
(Argentina) M Alund	2	2
7	(Germany) M Zverev	6	6
LL	(Germany) M Sieber	4	6	6^{5}
Q	(Chile) H Podlipnik-Castillo	6	1	7
(Austria) A Haider-Maurer	6	3	6
(Finland) H Kontinen	3	6	3
(Czech Republic) L Rosol	5	5
Q	(Germany) C-M Stebe	7	7
(Argentina) JP Brzezicki	5	3
6	(Spain) P Andújar	7	6

Second round
1	(Germany) S Greul	6	6
Q	(Czech Republic) R Vik	3	4
WC	(Germany) K Krawietz	6^{3}	6	0
7	(Germany) M Zverev	7	4	6
Q	(Chile) H Podlipnik-Castillo	6	6
(Austria) A Haider-Maurer	3	3
Q	(Germany) C-M Stebe	7	3	6
6	(Spain) P Andújar	5	6	3

Quarterfinals
1	(Germany) S Greul	6	4	6
7	(Germany) M Zverev	1	6	3
Q	(Chile) H Podlipnik-Castillo	3	2
Q	(Germany) C-M Stebe	6	6

Semifinals
1	(Germany) S Greul	5	6^{2}
Q	(Germany) C-M Stebe	7	7

=== Bottom half ===
First round
8	(Germany) D Kindlmann	3	6^{8}
PR	(Austria) M Slanar	6	7
(Czech Republic) J Pospíšil	7	3	4
(Austria) M Fischer	6^{2}	6	6
Q	(Slovakia) M Semjan	6^{3}	4
(Spain) I Cervantes-Huegun	7	6
WC	(Germany) M Zimmermann	7	6
4	(Austria) S Koubek	6^{2}	3
5	(Germany) J Reister	7	7
(Austria) P Oswald	6^{4}	6^{11}
(Czech Republic) J Minář	3	4
(France) G Rufin	6	6
(France) V Millot	1	2
WC	(Germany) P Gojowczyk	6	6
(Romania) V Crivoi	3	2
2/WC	(Germany) A Beck	6	6

Second round
PR	(Austria) M Slanar	2	4
(Austria) M Fischer	6	6
(Spain) I Cervantes-Huegun	6	5	4
WC	(Germany) M Zimmermann	4	7	6
5	(Germany) J Reister	5	7	6
(France) G Rufin	7	5	2
WC	(Germany) P Gojowczyk	6	3	6
2/WC	(Germany) A Beck	4	6	4

Quarterfinals
(Austria) M Fischer	7	7
WC	(Germany) M Zimmermann	6^{1}	6^{5}
5	(Germany) J Reister	6	6
WC	(Germany) P Gojowczyk	1	1

Semifinals
(Austria) M Fischer	6	6
5	(Germany) J Reister	3	3
