= 2009 Oberstaufen Cup – Doubles =

Doubles
- 2009 Oberstaufen Cup

Final
- Champions: (Germany) Dieter Kindlmann (Germany) Marcel Zimmermann
- Runners-up: (Germany) Michael Berrer (Austria) Philipp Oswald
- Score: 6–4, 2–6, [10–4]

Events
Singles	Doubles
← 2008 ·	Oberstaufen Cup	· 2010 →

Dušan Karol and Jaroslav Pospíšil were the defending champions, but Pospíšil didn't take part in these championships this year.
Karol partnered up with Olivier Charroin, but they were eliminated in the first round.
Dieter Kindlmann and Marcel Zimmermann defeated Michael Berrer and Philipp Oswald in the final 6–4, 2–6, [10–4].

== Seeds ==
1. (France) Olivier Charroin / (Czech Republic) Dušan Karol
2. (Italy) Alessandro Motti / (Italy) Simone Vagnozzi
3. (Germany) Michael Berrer / (Austria) Philipp Oswald (final)
4. (Brazil) ~~Rogério Dutra da Silva~~ / (Brazil) ~~João Souza~~ (withdrew)

== Draw ==
=== Key ===
- Q = Qualifier
- WC = Wild card
- LL = Lucky loser
- Alt = Alternate
- SE = Special exempt
- PR = Protected ranking
- ITF = ITF entry
- JE = Junior exempt
- w/o = Walkover
- r = Retired
- d = Defaulted
- SR = Special ranking

=== Draw ===
First round
1	(France) O Charroin (Czech Republic) D Karol	7	2	[10]
(Spain) I Cervantes-Huegun (Spain) J Checa-Calvo	5	6	[12]
(Argentina) D Álvarez (Chile) H Podlipnik-Castillo	6	7
(Spain) G Alcaide (Russia) N Nesterov	4	6^{4}
3	(Germany) M Berrer (Austria) P Oswald	6	6
ALT	(Germany) C Mohs (Germany) C-M Stebe	2	2
WC	(Germany) P Gojowczyk (Germany) V Pest	4	5
WC	(United States) R Rizza (Germany) M Zelch	6	7
(Jamaica) D Brown (South Korea) W-S Jun	5	6	[12]
(Romania) F Mergea (Romania) G Moraru	7	2	[14]
WC	(Germany) D Kindlmann (Germany) M Zimmermann	6	6
ALT	(Czech Republic) J Hájek (Czech Republic) R Štork	4	3
(Czech Republic) J Minář (Czech Republic) R Vik
(Chile) A García (Spain) M López	w/o
(Slovakia) K Čapkovič (Slovakia) P Červenák	6^{2}	1
2	(Italy) A Motti (Italy) S Vagnozzi	7	6

Quarterfinals
(Spain) I Cervantes-Huegun (Spain) J Checa-Calvo	1	3
(Argentina) D Álvarez (Chile) H Podlipnik-Castillo	6	6
3	(Germany) M Berrer (Austria) P Oswald	6	1	[12]
WC	(United States) R Rizza (Germany) M Zelch	1	6	[10]
(Romania) F Mergea (Romania) G Moraru	4	2
WC	(Germany) D Kindlmann (Germany) M Zimmermann	6	6
(Czech Republic) J Minář (Czech Republic) R Vik	2	2
2	(Italy) A Motti (Italy) S Vagnozzi	6	6

Semifinals
(Argentina) D Álvarez (Chile) H Podlipnik-Castillo	2	4
3	(Germany) M Berrer (Austria) P Oswald	6	6
WC	(Germany) D Kindlmann (Germany) M Zimmermann	6	6
2	(Italy) A Motti (Italy) S Vagnozzi	4	4

Finals
3	(Germany) M Berrer (Austria) P Oswald	4	6	[4]
WC	(Germany) D Kindlmann (Germany) M Zimmermann	6	2	[10]
