= 2009 Oberstaufen Cup =

- Date: July 6 – July 32
- Edition: 18th
- Location: Oberstaufen, Germany

Champions

Singles
- (Czech Republic) Robin Vik

Doubles
- (Germany) Dieter Kindlmann / (Germany) Marcel Zimmermann
← 2008 ·	Oberstaufen Cup	· 2010 →

The 2009 Oberstaufen Cup was a professional tennis tournament played on outdoor red clay courts. This was the eighteenth edition of the tournament which is part of the 2009 ATP Challenger Tour. It took place in Oberstaufen, Germany between 6 and 12 July 2009.

== Singles entrants ==
=== Seeds ===
Nationality	Player	Ranking*	Seeding
ARG	Martín Vassallo Argüello	57	1
GER	Michael Berrer	102	2
GER	Denis Gremelmayr	150	3
FRA	Alexandre Sidorenko	168	4
CZE	Jan Hájek	185	5
AUT	Stefan Koubek	189	6
GER	Dominik Meffert	194	7
SWE	Björn Rehnquist	202	8

- Rankings are as of June 29, 2009.

=== Other entrants ===
The following players received wildcards into the singles main draw:

- (Germany) Peter Gojowczyk
- (Austria) Stefan Koubek
- (Germany) Nils Langer
- (Germany) Marcel Zimmermann

The following players received entry from the qualifying draw:

- (Jamaica) Dustin Brown
- (South Korea) Jun Woong-Sun
- (Germany) Cedrik-Marcel Stebe
- (Czech Republic) Robin Vik

== Champions ==
=== Singles ===
(Czech Republic) Robin Vik def. (Czech Republic) Jan Minář, 6–1, 6–2

=== Doubles ===
(Germany) Dieter Kindlmann / (Germany) Marcel Zimmermann def. (Germany) Michael Berrer / (Austria) Philipp Oswald, 6–4, 2–6, [10–4]
