= 2009 Oberstaufen Cup – Singles =

Singles
- 2009 Oberstaufen Cup

Final
- Champion: (Czech Republic) Robin Vik
- Runner-up: (Czech Republic) Jan Minář
- Score: 6–1, 6–2

Events
Singles	Doubles
← 2008 ·	Oberstaufen Cup	· 2010 →

Łukasz Kubot was the defender of title; however, he chose to not take part in the tournament.
Robin Vik became the new champion after beating Jan Minář in the final 6–1, 6–2.

== Seeds ==
1. (Argentina) Martín Vassallo Argüello (first round)
2. (Germany) Michael Berrer (second round)
3. (Germany) Denis Gremelmayr (quarterfinals)
4. (France) Alexandre Sidorenko (first round)
5. (Czech Republic) Jan Hájek (first round)
6. (Austria) Stefan Koubek (semifinals)
7. (Germany) Dominik Meffert (first round)
8. (Sweden) Björn Rehnquist (first round)

== Draw ==
=== Key ===
- Q = Qualifier
- WC = Wild card
- LL = Lucky loser
- Alt = Alternate
- SE = Special exempt
- PR = Protected ranking
- ITF = ITF entry
- JE = Junior exempt
- w/o = Walkover
- r = Retired
- d = Defaulted
- SR = Special ranking

=== Final four ===
Semifinals
(Czech Republic) Jan Minář	7	7
6	(Austria) Stefan Koubek	6^{5}	5
(Brazil) João Souza	2	2
Q	(Czech Republic) Robin Vik	6	6

Final
(Czech Republic) Jan Minář	1	2
Q	(Czech Republic) Robin Vik	6	6

=== Top half ===
First round
1	(Argentina) M Vassallo Argüello	4	1
(Brazil) R Dutra da Silva	6	6
Q	(Germany) C-M Stebe	2	4
(Spain) I Cervantes-Huegun	6	6
(Slovakia) K Čapkovič	0	6	6
WC	(Germany) P Gojowczyk	6	4	3
(Czech Republic) J Minář	6	7
7	(Germany) D Meffert	2	5
3	(Germany) D Gremelmayr	6	6
(Romania) G Moraru	4	4
(Italy) S Vagnozzi	6	6
(Spain) M López	2	1
(Slovakia) P Červenák	6	6
WC	(Germany) N Langer	3	4
(Italy) A Arnaboldi	3	2
6/WC	(Austria) S Koubek	6	6

Second round
(Brazil) R Dutra da Silva	5	6	7
(Spain) I Cervantes-Huegun	7	4	6^{3}
(Slovakia) K Čapkovič	7	2	3
(Czech Republic) J Minář	6^{4}	6	6
3	(Germany) D Gremelmayr	6	6
(Italy) S Vagnozzi	3	2
(Slovakia) P Červenák	2	6^{4}
6/WC	(Austria) S Koubek	6	7

Quarterfinals
(Brazil) R Dutra da Silva	3	0	r
(Czech Republic) J Minář	6	3
3	(Germany) D Gremelmayr	1	2
6/WC	(Austria) S Koubek	6	6

Semifinals
(Czech Republic) J Minář	7	7
6/WC	(Austria) S Koubek	6^{5}	5

=== Bottom half ===
First round
5	(Czech Republic) J Hájek	6^{3}	1
(Germany) M Bachinger	7	6
WC	(Germany) M Zimmermann	1	6	6
Q	(Jamaica) D Brown	6	3	1
(Spain) G Alcaide	7	7
(Serbia) B Pašanski	6^{6}	6^{3}
(Brazil) J Souza	7	6
4	(France) A Sidorenko	5	1
8	(Sweden) B Rehnquist	2	1
(Germany) A Flock	6	6
(Spain) J Checa-Calvo	4	4
(Germany) D Kindlmann	6	6
Q	(Czech Republic) R Vik	6	6
(Argentina) D Álvarez	2	1
Q	(South Korea) W-S Jun	3	7	6^{2}
2	(Germany) M Berrer	6	5	7

Second round
(Germany) M Bachinger	7	4	6^{4}
WC	(Germany) M Zimmermann	6^{5}	6	7
(Spain) G Alcaide	2	r
(Brazil) J Souza	2
(Germany) A Flock	6	2	6
(Germany) D Kindlmann	3	6	3
Q	(Czech Republic) R Vik	6	7
2	(Germany) M Berrer	0	5

Quarterfinals
WC	(Germany) M Zimmermann	3	3
(Brazil) J Souza	6	6
(Germany) A Flock	1	4
Q	(Czech Republic) R Vik	6	6

Semifinals
(Brazil) J Souza	2	2
Q	(Czech Republic) R Vik	6	6
