= 2010 Oberstaufen Cup =

- Date: July 5 – July 11
- Edition: 19th
- Location: Oberstaufen, Germany

Champions

Singles
- (Austria) Martin Fischer

Doubles
- (Germany) Frank Moser / (Czech Republic) Lukáš Rosol
← 2009 ·	Oberstaufen Cup	· 2011 →

The 2010 Oberstaufen Cup was a professional tennis tournament played on outdoor red clay courts. This was the eleventh edition of the tournament which is part of the 2010 ATP Challenger Tour. It took place in Oberstaufen, Germany between 5 July and 11 July 2010.

== ATP entrants ==
=== Seeds ===
Nationality	Player	Ranking*	Seeding
GER	Simon Greul	62	1
GER	Andreas Beck	79	2
KAZ	~~Mikhail Kukushkin~~	~~114~~	~~3~~
AUT	Stefan Koubek	121	4
GER	Julian Reister	129	5
ESP	Pablo Andújar	139	6
GER	Mischa Zverev	144	7
GER	Dieter Kindlmann	153	8

- Rankings are as of June 21, 2010.

=== Other entrants ===
The following players received wildcards into the singles main draw:

- (Germany) Andreas Beck
- (Germany) Peter Gojowczyk
- (Germany) Kevin Krawietz
- (Germany) Marcel Zimmermann

The following players received entry from the qualifying draw:

- (Chile) Hans Podlipnik-Castillo
- (Slovakia) Marek Semjan
- (Germany) Marc Sieber (as a Lucky Loser)
- (Germany) Cedrik-Marcel Stebe
- (Czech Republic) Robin Vik

== Champions ==
=== Singles ===
(Austria) Martin Fischer def. (Germany) Cedrik-Marcel Stebe 6–3, 6–4

=== Doubles ===
(Germany) Frank Moser / (Czech Republic) Lukáš Rosol def. (Chile) Hans Podlipnik-Castillo / (Austria) Max Raditschnigg 6–0, 7–5
