= 2011 Oberstaufen Cup – Doubles =

Doubles
- 2011 Oberstaufen Cup

Final
- Champions: (Austria) Martin Fischer (Austria) Philipp Oswald
- Runners-up: (Poland) Tomasz Bednarek (Poland) Mateusz Kowalczyk
- Score: 7–6^{(7–1)}, 6–3

Events
| Singles | Doubles |
| ← 2010 · | Oberstaufen Cup | · 2012 → |

Rik de Voest and Lukáš Rosol were the defending champions but decided not to participate.

Martin Fischer and Philipp Oswald won in the final against Tomasz Bednarek and Mateusz Kowalczyk.

== Seeds ==
1. (Poland) Tomasz Bednarek / (Poland) Mateusz Kowalczyk (final)
2. (Austria) Martin Fischer / (Austria) Philipp Oswald (champions)
3. (South Africa) Jeff Coetzee / (Sweden) Andreas Siljeström (first round)
4. (Germany) Alex Satschko / (Germany) Simon Stadler (semifinals)

== Draw ==
=== Key ===
- Q = Qualifier
- WC = Wild card
- LL = Lucky loser
- Alt = Alternate
- SE = Special exempt
- PR = Protected ranking
- ITF = ITF entry
- JE = Junior exempt
- w/o = Walkover
- r = Retired
- d = Defaulted
- SR = Special ranking

=== Draw ===
First round
1 | (Poland) T Bednarek (Poland) M Kowalczyk | 6 | 2 | [10]
(Czech Republic) Michal Konečný (Spain) G Trujillo-Soler | 4 | 6 | [7]
(Italy) Fabio Colangelo (Italy) M Crugnola | 6 | 6
(Slovakia) P Červenák (Slovakia) M Kližan | 2 | 2
3 | (South Africa) J Coetzee (Sweden) A Siljeström | 3 | 2
(Germany) A Beck (Germany) A Waske | 6 | 6
(Germany) Jaan-Frederik Brunken (Finland) T Nieminen | 1 | 7 | [6]
(Germany) D Brands (Germany) K Krawietz | 6 | 5 | [10]
(Brazil) L Kirche (Brazil) J Pereira | 6 | 3 | [14]
(Germany) Andre Wiesler (Germany) Marko Zelch | 3 | 6 | [12]
(Romania) M Copil (Romania) V Crivoi | 3 | 2
4 | (Germany) A Satschko (Germany) S Stadler | 6 | 6
(Slovakia) K Čapkovič (Slovakia) M Semjan | w/o
(Germany) D Kindlmann (Germany) M Zimmermann
(Brazil) T Fernandes (Brazil) A Ghem | w/o
2 | (Austria) M Fischer (Austria) P Oswald

Quarterfinals
1 | (Poland) T Bednarek (Poland) M Kowalczyk | 6 | 6
(Italy) Fabio Colangelo (Italy) M Crugnola | 3 | 3
(Germany) A Beck (Germany) A Waske | 3 | 4
(Germany) D Brands (Germany) K Krawietz | 6 | 6
(Brazil) L Kirche (Brazil) J Pereira | w/o
4 | (Germany) A Satschko (Germany) S Stadler
(Germany) D Kindlmann (Germany) M Zimmermann | 3 | 6^{7}
2 | (Austria) M Fischer (Austria) P Oswald | 6 | 7^{9}

Semifinals
1 | (Poland) T Bednarek (Poland) M Kowalczyk | 6 | 5 | [11]
(Germany) D Brands (Germany) K Krawietz | 3 | 7 | [9]
4 | (Germany) A Satschko (Germany) S Stadler | 6^{5} | 3
2 | (Austria) M Fischer (Austria) P Oswald | 7^{7} | 6

Final
1 | (Poland) T Bednarek (Poland) M Kowalczyk | 6^{1} | 3
2 | (Austria) M Fischer (Austria) P Oswald | 7^{7} | 6
