= 2011 Oberstaufen Cup – Singles =

Singles
- 2011 Oberstaufen Cup

Final
- Champion: (Germany) Daniel Brands
- Runner-up: (Germany) Andreas Beck
- Score: 6–4, 7–6^{(7–3)}

Events
Singles	Doubles
← 2010 ·	Oberstaufen Cup	· 2012 →

Martin Fischer was the defending champion, but champion Daniel Brands defeated him in the quarterfinals.

3rd seed Brands claimed the title, defeating Andreas Beck in the final, 6–4, 7–6^{(7–3)}.

== Seeds ==
1. (Austria) ~~Andreas Haider-Maurer~~ (withdrew)
2. (Germany) Simon Greul (quarterfinals)
3. (Germany) Daniel Brands (champion)
4. (Slovakia) Martin Kližan (first round)
5. (Austria) Martin Fischer (quarterfinals)
6. (Germany) Andreas Beck (final)
7. (Serbia) Nikola Ćirić (quarterfinals)
8. (Romania) Victor Crivoi (first round)

== Draw ==
=== Key ===
- Q = Qualifier
- WC = Wild card
- LL = Lucky loser
- Alt = Alternate
- SE = Special exempt
- PR = Protected ranking
- ITF = ITF entry
- JE = Junior exempt
- w/o = Walkover
- r = Retired
- d = Defaulted
- SR = Special ranking

=== Finals ===
Semifinals
(Germany) Cedrik-Marcel Stebe	3	6	3
3	(Germany) Daniel Brands	6	4	6
6	(Germany) Andreas Beck	7^{7}	7^{7}
7	(Serbia) Nikola Ćirić	6^{5}	6^{0}

Final
3	(Germany) Daniel Brands	6	7^{7}
6	(Germany) Andreas Beck	4	6^{3}

=== Top half ===
First round
LL	(Brazil) A Ghem	6	5	6
(Czech Republic) J Hernych	3	7	1
WC	(Germany) M Zimmermann	6	6
Q	(Brazil) T Fernandes	1	2
(France) G Rufin	6	6
(Germany) Alexander Flock	3	2
(Germany) C-M Stebe	6	6
8	(Romania) V Crivoi	2	1
3	(Germany) D Brands	6	4	6
(Italy) M Crugnola	4	6	4
(Slovakia) P Červenák	7	6
WC	(Germany) K Krawietz	5	4
WC	(Croatia) B Puc	6	7^{7}
WC	(Germany) D Kindlmann	4	6^{5}
(Poland) M Gawron	2	4
5	(Austria) M Fischer	6	6

Second round
LL	(Brazil) A Ghem	6	6
WC	(Germany) M Zimmermann	4	4
(France) G Rufin	4	5
(Germany) C-M Stebe	6	7
3	(Germany) D Brands	6	6
(Slovakia) P Červenák	1	4
WC	(Croatia) B Puc	3	3
5	(Austria) M Fischer	6	6

Quarterfinals
LL	(Brazil) A Ghem	3	7	4
(Germany) C-M Stebe	6	5	6
3	(Germany) D Brands	7	6
5	(Austria) M Fischer	5	2

Semifinals
(Germany) C-M Stebe	3	6	3
3	(Germany) D Brands	6	4	6

=== Bottom half ===
First round
6	(Germany) A Beck	6	6
(Russia) E Donskoy	4	4
(Germany) B Knittel	7	4	2
(Romania) M Copil	5	6	6
Q	(Spain) G Trujillo-Soler	6	6
(Italy) Andrea Arnaboldi	2	4
(Chile) J Aguilar	7	3	7^{7}
4	(Slovakia) M Kližan	5	6	6^{4}
7	(Serbia) N Ćirić	4	6	7
(Croatia) K Mesaroš	6	2	6^{6}
(Finland) T Nieminen	2	1
Q	(Slovakia) K Čapkovič	6	6
Q	(Brazil) L Kirche	6	6^{5}	2
(Germany) S Stadler	3	7	6
(Slovakia) M Semjan	6	1	3
2	(Germany) S Greul	3	6	6

Second round
6	(Germany) A Beck	7	6
(Romania) M Copil	5	4
Q	(Spain) G Trujillo-Soler	1	3
(Chile) J Aguilar	6	6
7	(Serbia) N Ćirić	6	3	6
Q	(Slovakia) K Čapkovič	1	6	1
(Germany) S Stadler	3	4
2	(Germany) S Greul	6	6

Quarterfinals
6	(Germany) A Beck	6	6
(Chile) J Aguilar	4	3
7	(Serbia) N Ćirić	6	6
2	(Germany) S Greul	4	3

Semifinals
6	(Germany) A Beck	7^{7}	7^{7}
7	(Serbia) N Ćirić	6^{5}	6^{0}
