= 2013 Oberstaufen Cup =

- Date: 22 – 28 July
- Edition: 22nd
- Surface: Clay
- Location: Oberstaufen, Germany

Champions

Singles
- (France) Guillaume Rufin

Doubles
- (Germany) Dominik Meffert / (Austria) Philipp Oswald
← 2012 ·	Oberstaufen Cup	· 2014 →

The 2013 Oberstaufen Cup was a professional tennis tournament played on clay courts. It was the 22nd edition of the Oberstaufen Cup, which was part of the 2013 ATP Challenger Tour. It took place in Oberstaufen, Germany between 22 and 28 July 2013.

== Singles main draw entrants ==
=== Seeds ===
Country	Player	Rank^{1}	Seed
GER	Jan-Lennard Struff	105	1
ARG	Martín Alund	110	2
FRA	Guillaume Rufin	111	3
FRA	Marc Gicquel	130	4
UKR	Oleksandr Nedovyesov	143	5
GER	Peter Gojowczyk	165	6
GER	Simon Greul	166	7
GER	Bastian Knittel	176	8

- ^{1} Rankings are as of July 15, 2013.

=== Other entrants ===
The following players received wildcards into the singles main draw:

- (Germany) Andreas Beck
- (Germany) Robin Kern
- (Germany) Kevin Krawietz
- (Germany) Maximilian Marterer

The following players received entry from the qualifying draw:

- (Netherlands) Stephan Fransen
- (Czech Republic) Ivo Minář
- (Brazil) Thiago Monteiro
- (Russia) Alexey Vatutin

== Champions ==
=== Singles ===
- (France) Guillaume Rufin def. (Germany) Peter Gojowczyk 6–3, 6–4

=== Doubles ===
- (Germany) Dominik Meffert / (Austria) Philipp Oswald def. (Netherlands) Stephan Fransen / (New Zealand) Artem Sitak 6–1, 3–6, [14–12]
