= 2013 Oberstaufen Cup – Singles =

Singles
- 2013 Oberstaufen Cup

Final
- Champion: (France) Guillaume Rufin
- Runner-up: (Germany) Peter Gojowczyk
- Score: 6–3, 6–4

Events
Singles	Doubles
← 2012 ·	Oberstaufen Cup	· 2014 →

Dominik Meffert was the defending champion, but lost to Guillaume Rufin in the semifinals.

Rufin won the title, defeating Peter Gojowczyk in the final, 6–3, 6–4.

== Seeds ==
1. (Germany) Jan-Lennard Struff (first round)
2. (Argentina) Martín Alund (quarterfinals)
3. (France) Guillaume Rufin (champion)
4. (France) Marc Gicquel (first round)
5. (Ukraine) Oleksandr Nedovyesov (semifinals)
6. (Germany) Peter Gojowczyk (final)
7. (Germany) Simon Greul (first round)
8. (Germany) Bastian Knittel (first round)

== Draw ==
=== Key ===
- Q = Qualifier
- WC = Wild card
- LL = Lucky loser
- Alt = Alternate
- SE = Special exempt
- PR = Protected ranking
- ITF = ITF entry
- JE = Junior exempt
- w/o = Walkover
- r = Retired
- d = Defaulted
- SR = Special ranking

=== Finals ===
Semifinals
5	(Ukraine) Oleksandr Nedovyesov	4	7^{7}	1
6	(Germany) Peter Gojowczyk	6	6^{3}	6
3	(France) Guillaume Rufin	6	6
(Germany) Dominik Meffert	3	1

Final
6	(Germany) Peter Gojowczyk	3	4
3	(France) Guillaume Rufin	6	6

=== Top half ===
First round
1	(Germany) J-L Struff	6^{7}	2
Q	(Brazil) T Monteiro	7^{9}	6
(Brazil) A Ghem	4	6	7^{7}
(Slovakia) M Mečíř	6	3	6^{4}
(Switzerland) M Lammer	1	6	2
(Netherlands) M Middelkoop	6	3	6
(Germany) N Langer	6^{3}	1
5	(Ukraine) O Nedovyesov	7^{7}	6
4	(France) M Gicquel	7	6^{2}	0
WC	(Germany) A Beck	5	7^{7}	6
Q	(Netherlands) S Fransen	3	4
(Germany) C-M Stebe	6	6
(Brazil) L Kirche	4	6	6^{3}
Q	(Czech Republic) I Minář	6	4	7^{7}
(Austria) G Melzer	5	4
6	(Germany) P Gojowczyk	7	6

Second round
Q	(Brazil) T Monteiro	5	6	6
(Brazil) A Ghem	7	3	4
(Netherlands) M Middelkoop	3	0
5	(Ukraine) O Nedovyesov	6	6
WC	(Germany) A Beck	6	6
(Germany) C-M Stebe	4	2
Q	(Czech Republic) I Minář	4	6	4
6	(Germany) P Gojowczyk	6	3	6

Quarterfinals
(Brazil) T Monteiro	4	3
5	(Ukraine) O Nedovyesov	6	6
WC	(Germany) A Beck	6^{3}	6	2
6	(Germany) P Gojowczyk	7^{7}	3	6

Semifinals
5	(Ukraine) O Nedovyesov	4	7^{7}	1
6	(Germany) P Gojowczyk	6	6^{3}	6

=== Bottom half ===
First round
8	(Germany) B Knittel	3	4
(Moldova) R Albot	6	6
(Slovakia) J Kovalík	7	6
(Germany) T Pütz	5	3
(Brazil) T Alves	0	0
(France) L Pouille	6	6
(Slovakia) M Semjan	3	1
3	(France) G Rufin	6	6
7	(Germany) S Greul	3	2
(Germany) D Meffert	6	6
Q	(Russia) A Vatutin	6	6
WC	(Germany) R Kern	3	3
(Austria) M Fischer	6	5	6
WC	(Germany) M Marterer	4	7	3
WC	(Germany) K Krawietz	6	3	5
2	(Argentina) M Alund	3	6	7

Second round
(Moldova) R Albot	6^{5}	7	7^{7}
(Slovakia) J Kovalík	7^{7}	5	6^{5}
(France) L Pouille	1	4
3	(France) G Rufin	6	6
(Germany) D Meffert	6	6
Q	(Russia) A Vatutin	2	3
(Austria) M Fischer	6	4	3
2	(Argentina) M Alund	4	6	6

Quarterfinals
(Moldova) R Albot	2	5
3	(France) G Rufin	6	7
(Germany) D Meffert	2	6	6
2	(Argentina) M Alund	6	1	4

Semifinals
3	(France) G Rufin	6	6
(Germany) D Meffert	3	1
