= 2014 Oberstaufen Cup =

- Date: 21 – 27 July
- Edition: 23rd
- Surface: Clay
- Location: Oberstaufen, Germany

Champions

Singles
- (Italy) Simone Bolelli

Doubles
- (Netherlands) Wesley Koolhof / (Italy) Alessandro Motti
← 2013 ·	Oberstaufen Cup	· 2015 →

The 2014 Oberstaufen Cup was a professional tennis tournament played on clay courts. It was the 23rd edition of the tournament which was part of the 2014 ATP Challenger Tour. It took place in Oberstaufen, Germany between 21 and 27 July 2014.

== Singles main-draw entrants ==
=== Seeds ===
Country	Player	Rank^{1}	Seed
ITA	Simone Bolelli	109	1
GER	Peter Gojowczyk	115	2
GER	Andreas Beck	118	3
GER	Michael Berrer	134	4
POL	Michał Przysiężny	144	5
HUN	Márton Fucsovics	166	6
SVK	Miloslav Mečíř Jr.	176	7
AUT	Martin Fischer	179	8

- ^{1} Rankings are as of July 14, 2014.

=== Other entrants ===
The following players received wildcards into the singles main draw:

- (Italy) Simone Bolelli
- (Germany) Philipp Petzschner
- (Germany) Kevin Krawietz
- (Germany) Johannes Härteis

The following players received entry from the qualifying draw:

- (Austria) Gibril Diarra
- (Slovakia) Jozef Kovalík
- (Netherlands) Wesley Koolhof
- (Poland) Andriej Kapaś

== Champions ==
=== Singles ===
- (Italy) Simone Bolelli def. (Germany) Michael Berrer 7–5, 1–6, 6–3

=== Doubles ===
- (Netherlands) Wesley Koolhof / (Italy) Alessandro Motti def. (Moldova) Radu Albot / (Poland) Mateusz Kowalczyk 7–6^{(9–7)}, 6–3
