= 2011 Oberstaufen Cup =

- Date: July 4 – July 10
- Edition: 20th
- Location: Oberstaufen, Germany

Champions

Singles
- (Germany) Daniel Brands

Doubles
- (Austria) Martin Fischer / (Austria) Philipp Oswald
- Oberstaufen Cup

The 2011 Oberstaufen Cup was a professional tennis tournament played on clay courts. It was part of the 2011 ATP Challenger Tour. It was the 20th edition of the tournament. It took place in Oberstaufen, Germany between July 4 and July 10, 2011.

== ATP entrants ==
=== Seeds ===
Country	Player	Rank^{1}	Seed
AUT	Andreas Haider-Maurer	78	1
GER	Simon Greul	127	2
GER	Daniel Brands	139	3
SVK	Martin Kližan	146	4
AUT	Martin Fischer	151	5
GER	Andreas Beck	156	6
SRB	Nikola Ćirić	176	7
ROU	Victor Crivoi	185	8

- ^{1} Rankings are as of June 20, 2011.

=== Other entrants ===
The following players received wildcards into the singles main draw:

- (Germany) Dieter Kindlmann
- (Germany) Kevin Krawietz
- (Croatia) Borut Puc
- (Germany) Marcel Zimmermann

The following players received entry from the qualifying draw:

- (Slovakia) Kamil Čapkovič
- (Brazil) Tiago Fernandes
- (Brazil) Leonardo Kirche
- (Spain) Gabriel Trujillo Soler

The following player received entry into the singles main draw as a lucky loser:

- (Brazil) André Ghem

== Champions ==
=== Men's singles ===
(Germany) Daniel Brands def. (Germany) Andreas Beck, 6–4, 7–6^{(7–3)}

=== Men's doubles ===
(Austria) Martin Fischer / (Austria) Philipp Oswald def. (Poland) Tomasz Bednarek / (Poland) Mateusz Kowalczyk, 7–6^{(7–1)}, 6–3
