= 2014 Oberstaufen Cup – Singles =

Singles
- 2014 Oberstaufen Cup

Final
- Champions: (Italy) Simone Bolelli
- Runners-up: (Germany) Michael Berrer
- Score: 6–4, 7–6^{(7–2)}

Events
Singles	Doubles
← 2013 ·	Oberstaufen Cup

Guillaume Rufin is the defending champion, after defeating Peter Gojowczyk.

Simone Bolelli won the title, beating Michael Berrer 6–4, 7–6^{(7–2)}.

== Seeds ==
1. (Italy) Simone Bolelli (champion)
2. (Germany) Peter Gojowczyk (quarterfinals)
3. (Germany) Andreas Beck (semifinals)
4. (Germany) Michael Berrer (final)
5. (Poland) Michał Przysiężny (first round)
6. (Hungary) Márton Fucsovics (quarterfinals)
7. (Slovakia) Miloslav Mečíř Jr. (first round)
8. (Austria) Martin Fischer (first round)

== Draw ==
=== Key ===
- Q = Qualifier
- WC = Wild card
- LL = Lucky loser
- Alt = Alternate
- SE = Special exempt
- PR = Protected ranking
- ITF = ITF entry
- JE = Junior exempt
- w/o = Walkover
- r = Retired
- d = Defaulted
- SR = Special ranking

=== Finals ===
Semifinals
1/WC	(Italy) Simone Bolelli	7	1	6
3	(Germany) Andreas Beck	5	6	3
4	(Germany) Michael Berrer	6	1	6
(Italy) Roberto Marcora	4	6	2

Final
1/WC	(Italy) Simone Bolelli	6	7^{7}
4	(Germany) Michael Berrer	4	6^{2}

=== Top half ===
First round
1/WC	(Italy) S Bolelli	6	6
(Croatia) A Veić	1	2
(Portugal) R Machado	1	6	6
(Brazil) A Ghem	6	3	4
(Czech Republic) J Hájek	6	6
(Georgia (country)) N Basilashvili	3	4
(France) M Vaïsse	3	6	1
7	(Slovakia) M Mečíř	6	3	6
3	(Germany) A Beck	6	6
Q	(Poland) A Kapaś	3	1
(Moldova) R Albot	6	6
Q	(Netherlands) W Koolhof	1	4
Q	(Austria) Gibril Diarra	6	6
(Spain) G Granollers	3	4
WC	(Germany) P Petzschner	1	6^{5}
5	(Poland) M Przysiężny	6	7^{7}

Second round
1/WC	(Italy) S Bolelli	7	6
(Portugal) R Machado	5	3
(Czech Republic) J Hájek	6	6
7	(Slovakia) M Mečíř	4	3
3	(Germany) A Beck	4	6	6
(Moldova) R Albot	6	2	3
Q	(Austria) G Diarra	7^{7}	6
5	(Poland) M Przysiężny	6^{2}	4

Quarterfinals
1/WC	(Italy) S Bolelli	6	6
(Czech Republic) J Hájek	3	2
3	(Germany) A Beck	6	6
Q	(Austria) G Diarra	2	0

Semifinals
1/WC	(Italy) S Bolelli	7	1	6
3	(Germany) A Beck	5	6	3

=== Bottom half ===
First round
6	(Hungary) M Fucsovics	6	6
(Chile) H Podlipnik-Castillo	3	1
LL	(Poland) G Panfil	7^{7}	0	1
(Germany) M Bachinger	6^{5}	6	6
Q	(Slovakia) J Kovalík	6	6
(Czech Republic) J Pospíšil	0	1
(France) J Eysseric	0	5
4	(Germany) M Berrer	6	7
8	(Austria) M Fischer	3	4
(Italy) R Marcora	6	6
(Egypt) M Sawat	6	7
WC	(Germany) J Härteis	2	5
(Argentina) M Alund	7^{7}	6
(Spain) R Carballés Baena	6^{2}	4
WC	(Germany) K Krawietz	6^{5}	2
2	(Germany) P Gojowczyk	7^{7}	6

Second round
6	(Hungary) M Fucsovics	6	6
(Germany) M Bachinger	2	4
Q	(Slovakia) J Kovalík	5	5
4	(Germany) M Berrer	7	7
(Italy) R Marcora	5	6	6
(Egypt) M Sawat	7	1	4
(Argentina) M Alund	2	5
2	(Germany) P Gojowczyk	6	7

Quarterfinals
6	(Hungary) M Fucsovics	6	6^{5}	6^{4}
4	(Germany) M Berrer	3	7^{7}	7^{7}
(Italy) R Marcora	6	6
2	(Germany) P Gojowczyk	3	1

Semifinals
4	(Germany) M Berrer	6	1	6
(Italy) R Marcora	4	6	2
