= 2010 Oberstaufen Cup – Doubles =

Doubles
- 2010 Oberstaufen Cup

Final
- Champion: (Germany) Frank Moser (Czech Republic) Lukáš Rosol
- Runner-up: (Chile) Hans Podlipnik (Austria) Max Raditschnigg
- Score: 6–0, 7–5

Events
Singles	Doubles
- Oberstaufen Cup

Dieter Kindlmann and Marcel Zimmermann were the defending champions, but Kindlmann chose not to compete this year.
Zimmermann played with Kevin Krawietz, however they lost to Philipp Oswald and Mischa Zverev in the quarterfinals.
Frank Moser and Lukáš Rosol won the final 6–0, 7–5 against Hans Podlipnik and Max Raditschnigg.

== Seeds ==
The top three seeds received a bye into the second round.

1. (Czech Republic) David Škoch / (Austria) Martin Slanar (semifinals)
2. (Austria) Philipp Oswald / (Germany) Mischa Zverev (semifinals)
3. (Germany) Frank Moser / (Czech Republic) Lukáš Rosol
4. (Argentina) Juan Pablo Brzezicki / (Spain) Guillermo Olaso (first round)

== Main draw ==
Key

- Q = Qualifier
- WC = Wild card
- LL = Lucky loser
- Alt = Alternate
- ITF = ITF entry
- PR = Protected ranking
- SR = Special ranking
- SE = Special exempt
- JE = Junior exempt
- JR = Junior Accelerator Programme entrant
- CO = College Accelerator Programme entrant
- NG = Next Gen Accelerator Program entrant
- w/o = Walkover
- r = Retired
- d = Defaulted

=== Draw ===
First round
(Czech Republic) J Minář (Czech Republic) J Pospíšil	6	1	[4]
(Argentina) M Alund (Spain) I Cervantes-Huegun	1	6	[10]
4	(Argentina) J Brzezicki (Spain) G Olaso	3	3
(Chile) H Podlipnik-Castillo (Austria) M Raditschnigg	6	6
(Germany) P Gojowczyk (Germany) M Sieber	6	6
(Germany) A Wiesler (Germany) M Zelch	2	2
(Kazakhstan) M Kukushkin (Russia) D Matsukevich	w/o
WC	(Austria) A Haider-Maurer (Germany) B Knittel
WC	(Germany) K Krawietz (Germany) M Zimmermann	7	6
(Romania) C Gârd (Germany) C Mohs	6^{3}	1

Quarterfinals
1	(Czech Republic) D Škoch (Austria) M Slanar	6	6
(Argentina) M Alund (Spain) I Cervantes-Huegun	2	3
(Chile) H Podlipnik-Castillo (Austria) M Raditschnigg	6	6
(Germany) P Gojowczyk (Germany) M Sieber	2	4
WC	(Austria) A Haider-Maurer (Germany) B Knittel	3	2
3	(Germany) F Moser (Czech Republic) L Rosol	6	6
WC	(Germany) K Krawietz (Germany) M Zimmermann	5	2
2	(Austria) P Oswald (Germany) M Zverev	7	6

Semifinals
1	(Czech Republic) D Škoch (Austria) M Slanar	6	1	[2]
(Chile) H Podlipnik-Castillo (Austria) M Raditschnigg	4	6	[10]
3	(Germany) F Moser (Czech Republic) L Rosol	7	3	[10]
2	(Austria) P Oswald (Germany) M Zverev	5	6	[6]

Finals
(Chile) H Podlipnik-Castillo (Austria) M Raditschnigg	0	5
3	(Germany) F Moser (Czech Republic) L Rosol	6	7
