= 2012 Oberstaufen Cup – Singles =

Singles
- 2012 Oberstaufen Cup

Final
- Champion: (Germany) Dominik Meffert
- Runner-up: (Germany) Nils Langer
- Score: 6–4, 6–3

Events
Singles	Doubles
← 2011 ·	Oberstaufen Cup	· 2013 →

Daniel Brands was the defending champion but decided not to participate.
Dominik Meffert won the title, defeating Nils Langer 6–4, 6–3 in the final.

== Seeds ==
1. (Spain) Daniel Gimeno-Traver (quarterfinals)
2. (Germany) Matthias Bachinger (quarterfinals)
3. (Russia) Andrey Kuznetsov (semifinals)
4. (France) Guillaume Rufin (semifinals)
5. (Spain) Daniel Muñoz de la Nava (first round)
6. (Argentina) Martín Alund (quarterfinals)
7. (Spain) Arnau Brugués-Davi (second round)
8. (Argentina) Diego Junqueira (first round)

== Draw ==
=== Key ===
- Q = Qualifier
- WC = Wild card
- LL = Lucky loser
- Alt = Alternate
- SE = Special exempt
- PR = Protected ranking
- ITF = ITF entry
- JE = Junior exempt
- w/o = Walkover
- r = Retired
- d = Defaulted
- SR = Special ranking

=== Finals ===
Semifinals
Q	(Germany) Nils Langer	6	6
3	(Russia) Andrey Kuznetsov	1	4
4	(France) Guillaume Rufin	6^{5}	3
(Germany) Dominik Meffert	7^{7}	6

Final
Q	(Germany) Nils Langer	4	3
(Germany) Dominik Meffert	6	6

=== Top half ===
First round
1	(Spain) D Gimeno-Traver	7^{7}	7^{7}
(Moldova) R Albot	6^{3}	6^{5}
Q	(Romania) A Dăescu	0	0^{r}
(Czech Republic) J Mertl	6	1
(Netherlands) T Schoorel	6	3	6
(Spain) I Navarro	4	6	3
Q	(Germany) N Langer	6	6
5	(Spain) D Muñoz de la Nava	3	2
3	(Russia) A Kuznetsov	6	2	6
(France) M Teixeira	2	6	2
WC	(Germany) B Knittel	6	1
PR	(Croatia) F Škugor	3	1^{r}
(France) G Burquier	7^{7}	6
WC	(Germany) R Kern	6^{2}	0
PR	(Australia) J Millman	5	4
6	(Argentina) M Alund	7	6

Second round
1	(Spain) D Gimeno-Traver	6	6
(Czech Republic) J Mertl	3	4
(Netherlands) T Schoorel	6^{3}	2
Q	(Germany) N Langer	7^{7}	6
3	(Russia) A Kuznetsov	6	3	6
WC	(Germany) B Knittel	1	6	1
(France) G Burquier	6^{4}	2
6	(Argentina) M Alund	7^{7}	6

Quarterfinals
1	(Spain) D Gimeno-Traver	6^{5}	4
Q	(Germany) N Langer	7^{7}	6
3	(Russia) A Kuznetsov	6	7
6	(Argentina) M Alund	2	5

Semifinals
Q	(Germany) N Langer	6	6
3	(Russia) A Kuznetsov	1	4

=== Bottom half ===
First round
8	(Argentina) D Junqueira	3	3
(Argentina) P Galdón	6	6
(Netherlands) J Huta Galung	2	6^{7}
(Spain) A Menéndez	6	7^{9}
(France) M Rodrigues	6	1	6
Q	(France) Antoine Benneteau	3	6	2
Q	(Slovakia) M Semjan	2	3
4	(France) G Rufin	6	6
7	(Spain) A Brugués-Davi	6	6
(Germany) S Greul	3	1
(Germany) D Meffert	7^{9}	6
WC	(Germany) K Krawietz	6^{7}	3
(Czech Republic) I Minář	7	6
(Czech Republic) D Lojda	5	1
WC	(Germany) Daniel Baumann	2	1
2	(Germany) M Bachinger	6	6

Second round
(Argentina) P Galdón	7^{7}	6
(Spain) A Menéndez	6^{2}	1
(France) M Rodrigues	2	3
4	(France) G Rufin	6	6
7	(Spain) A Brugués-Davi	4	4
(Germany) D Meffert	6	6
(Czech Republic) I Minář	5	2
2	(Germany) M Bachinger	7	6

Quarterfinals
(Argentina) P Galdón	3	6	6^{5}
4	(France) G Rufin	6	1	7^{7}
(Germany) D Meffert	6	3	6
2	(Germany) M Bachinger	2	6	4

Semifinals
4	(France) G Rufin	6^{5}	3
(Germany) D Meffert	7^{7}	6
