= 2013 Oberstaufen Cup – Doubles =

Doubles
- 2013 Oberstaufen Cup

Final
- Champions: (Germany) Dominik Meffert (Austria) Philipp Oswald
- Runners-up: (Netherlands) Stephan Fransen (New Zealand) Artem Sitak
- Score: 6–1, 3–6, [14–12]

Events
Singles	Doubles
← 2012 ·	Oberstaufen Cup	· 2014 →

Andrei Dăescu and Florin Mergea were the defending champions but decided not to participate.
Dominik Meffert and Philipp Oswald won the title, defeating Stephan Fransen and Artem Sitak 6–1, 3–6, [14–12] in the final.

== Seeds ==
1. (Sweden) Andreas Siljeström / (Slovakia) Igor Zelenay (semifinals)
2. (Germany) Dominik Meffert / (Austria) Philipp Oswald (champions)
3. (Australia) Colin Ebelthite / (Chinese Taipei) Lee Hsin-han (quarterfinals)
4. (Netherlands) Stephan Fransen / (New Zealand) Artem Sitak (final)

== Draw ==
=== Key ===
- Q = Qualifier
- WC = Wild card
- LL = Lucky loser
- Alt = Alternate
- SE = Special exempt
- PR = Protected ranking
- ITF = ITF entry
- JE = Junior exempt
- w/o = Walkover
- r = Retired
- d = Defaulted
- SR = Special ranking

=== Draw ===
First round
(Brazil) L Kirche (Brazil) T Monteiro	5	1
(Bulgaria) V Dimov (Argentina) N Kicker	7	6
4	(Netherlands) S Fransen (New Zealand) A Sitak	7	6
(Germany) S Greul (Germany) B Knittel	5	1
(Brazil) T Alves (Spain) Edualdo Bonet-de Gispert
(Brazil) A Ghem (Netherlands) M Middelkoop	w/o
(Germany) G Kretschmer (Germany) A Satschko	6	6
(Germany) P Gojowczyk (Switzerland) M Lammer	0	3
(Germany) K Krawietz (Germany) M Marterer	4	2
(Austria) Lukas Jastraunig (Austria) G Melzer	6	6

Quarterfinals
1	(Sweden) A Siljeström (Slovakia) I Zelenay	6	6
(Bulgaria) V Dimov (Argentina) N Kicker	4	2
4	(Netherlands) S Fransen (New Zealand) A Sitak	6	6
(Brazil) A Ghem (Netherlands) M Middelkoop	3	2
(Germany) G Kretschmer (Germany) A Satschko	6	4	[10]
3	(Australia) C Ebelthite (Chinese Taipei) H-h Lee	4	6	[8]
(Austria) L Jastraunig (Austria) G Melzer	3	2
2	(Germany) D Meffert (Austria) P Oswald	6	6

Semifinals
1	(Sweden) A Siljeström (Slovakia) I Zelenay	6^{2}	4
4	(Netherlands) S Fransen (New Zealand) A Sitak	7^{7}	6
(Germany) G Kretschmer (Germany) A Satschko	2	6^{5}
2	(Germany) D Meffert (Austria) P Oswald	6	7^{7}

Final
4	(Netherlands) S Fransen (New Zealand) A Sitak	1	6	[12]
2	(Germany) D Meffert (Austria) P Oswald	6	3	[14]
