= 2012 Oberstaufen Cup =

- Date: 23 – 29 July
- Edition: 21st
- Surface: Clay
- Location: Oberstaufen, Germany

Champions

Singles
- (Germany) Dominik Meffert

Doubles
- (Romania) Andrei Dăescu / (Romania) Florin Mergea
- Oberstaufen Cup

The 2012 Oberstaufen Cup was a professional tennis tournament played on clay courts. It was the 21st edition of the tournament which was part of the 2012 ATP Challenger Tour. It took place in Oberstaufen, Germany between 23 and 29 July 2012.

== Singles main draw entrants ==
=== Seeds ===
Country	Player	Rank^{1}	Seed
ESP	Daniel Gimeno Traver	99	1
GER	Matthias Bachinger	115	2
RUS	Andrey Kuznetsov	128	3
FRA	Guillaume Rufin	131	4
ESP	Daniel Muñoz de la Nava	142	5
ARG	Martín Alund	151	6
ESP	Arnau Brugués-Davi	169	7
ARG	Diego Junqueira	186	8

- ^{1} Rankings are as of July 16, 2012.

=== Other entrants ===
The following players received wildcards into the singles main draw:

- (Germany) Daniel Baumann
- (Germany) Robin Kern
- (Germany) Bastian Knittel
- (Germany) Kevin Krawietz

The following players received entry from the qualifying draw:

- (France) Antoine Benneteau
- (Romania) Andrei Dăescu
- (Germany) Nils Langer
- (Slovakia) Marek Semjan

== Champions ==
=== Singles ===
- (Germany) Dominik Meffert def. (Germany) Nils Langer, 6–4, 6–3

=== Doubles ===
- (Romania) Andrei Dăescu / (Romania) Florin Mergea def. (Russia) Andrey Kuznetsov / (New Zealand) Jose Rubin Statham, 7–6^{(7–4)}, 7–6^{(7–1)}
