= 2014 Oberstaufen Cup – Doubles =

Doubles
- 2014 Oberstaufen Cup

Final
- Champions: (Netherlands) Wesley Koolhof (Italy) Alessandro Motti
- Runners-up: (Moldova) Radu Albot (Poland) Mateusz Kowalczyk
- Score: 7–6^{(9–7)}, 6–3

Events
Singles	Doubles
← 2013 ·	Oberstaufen Cup

Dominik Meffert and Philipp Oswald are the defending champions but decided not to participate.

Wesley Koolhof and Alessandro Motti won the tournament, beating Radu Albot and Mateusz Kowalczyk 7–6^{(9–7)}, 6–3

== Seeds ==
1. (Italy) Riccardo Ghedin / (Italy) Claudio Grassi (semifinals)
2. (Moldova) Radu Albot / (Poland) Mateusz Kowalczyk (final)
3. (Netherlands) Wesley Koolhof / (Italy) Alessandro Motti (champion)
4. (Poland) Andriej Kapaś / (Poland) Błażej Koniusz (quarterfinals)

== Draw ==
=== Key ===
- Q = Qualifier
- WC = Wild card
- LL = Lucky loser
- Alt = Alternate
- SE = Special exempt
- PR = Protected ranking
- ITF = ITF entry
- JE = Junior exempt
- w/o = Walkover
- r = Retired
- d = Defaulted
- SR = Special ranking

=== Draw ===
First round
(Brazil) A Ghem (Brazil) J Souza	3	3
(Georgia (country)) N Basilashvili (Netherlands) Romano Frantzen	6	6
3	(Netherlands) W Koolhof (Italy) A Motti	4	6	[15]
(Poland) Piotr Gadomski (Poland) G Panfil	6	3	[13]
WC	(Austria) Gibril Diarra (Slovakia) J Kovalík	2	1
(Austria) S Bader (United States) V Mirzadeh	6	6
(Portugal) R Machado (Serbia) G Tošić	7^{8}	1	[10]
(France) O Charroin (Netherlands) S Fransen	6^{6}	6	[6]
(France) J Eysseric (Hungary) M Fucsovics	4	4
4	(Poland) A Kapaś (Poland) B Koniusz	6	6
(Austria) M Fischer (Switzerland) Jannis Liniger	w/o
(Spain) R Carballés Baena (Spain) G Granollers
WC	(Poland) Maciej Smola (Croatia) A Veić	0	1
2	(Moldova) R Albot (Poland) M Kowalczyk	6	6

Quarterfinals
1	(Italy) R Ghedin (Italy) C Grassi	6	6
(Georgia (country)) N Basilashvili (Netherlands) R Frantzen	4	0
3	(Netherlands) W Koolhof (Italy) A Motti	6	7
(Austria) S Bader (United States) V Mirzadeh	0	5
(Portugal) R Machado (Serbia) G Tošić	7^{7}	6
4	(Poland) A Kapaś (Poland) B Koniusz	6^{2}	4
(Austria) M Fischer (Switzerland) J Liniger	6	1	[5]
2	(Moldova) R Albot (Poland) M Kowalczyk	3	6	[10]

Semifinals
1	(Italy) R Ghedin (Italy) C Grassi	4	2
3	(Netherlands) W Koolhof (Italy) A Motti	6	6
(Portugal) R Machado (Serbia) G Tošić	6	6^{5}	[6]
2	(Moldova) R Albot (Poland) M Kowalczyk	4	7^{7}	[10]

Final
3	(Netherlands) W Koolhof (Italy) A Motti	7^{9}	6
2	(Moldova) R Albot (Poland) M Kowalczyk	6^{7}	3
