= 2012 Oberstaufen Cup – Doubles =

Doubles
- 2012 Oberstaufen Cup

Final
- Champions: (Romania) Andrei Dăescu (Romania) Florin Mergea
- Runners-up: (Russia) Andrey Kuznetsov (New Zealand) Jose Rubin Statham
- Score: 7–6^{(7–4)}, 7–6^{(7–1)}

Events
Singles	Doubles
← 2011 ·	Oberstaufen Cup	· 2013 →

Martin Fischer and Philipp Oswald were the defending champions but decided not to participate.
Andrei Dăescu and Florin Mergea won the title, defeating Andrey Kuznetsov and Jose Rubin Statham 7–6^{(7–4)}, 7–6^{(7–1)} in the final.

== Seeds ==
1. (Czech Republic) Lukáš Dlouhý / (Czech Republic) David Škoch (first round)
2. (Romania) Andrei Dăescu / (Romania) Florin Mergea (champions)
3. (Spain) Adrián Menéndez / (Spain) Iván Navarro (first round)
4. (Australia) Adam Hubble / (Australia) Nima Roshan (quarterfinals)

== Draw ==
=== Key ===
- Q = Qualifier
- WC = Wild card
- LL = Lucky loser
- Alt = Alternate
- SE = Special exempt
- PR = Protected ranking
- ITF = ITF entry
- JE = Junior exempt
- w/o = Walkover
- r = Retired
- d = Defaulted
- SR = Special ranking

=== Draw ===
First round
1	(Czech Republic) L Dlouhý (Czech Republic) D Škoch	6^{5}	2
(Argentina) P Galdón (Argentina) M Trungelliti	7^{7}	6
(Spain) Jordi Marsé-Vidri (Spain) C Poch-Gradin	6	6
(Argentina) M Alund (Argentina) D Junqueira	0	2
3	(Spain) A Menéndez (Spain) I Navarro	6^{4}	6	[7]
(Germany) A Satschko (Croatia) F Škugor	7^{7}	3	[10]
(Russia) A Kuznetsov (New Zealand) J Statham	6	7
WC	(Spain) A Brugués-Davi (Spain) Narcis Pelach Torres	2	5
(Germany) K Krawietz (Germany) D Meffert	6	6
(France) Antoine Benneteau (Switzerland) Stefan Fiacan	0	1
(Germany) M Bachinger (Greece) Niko Karagiannis	7^{7}	3	[6]
4	(Australia) A Hubble (Australia) N Roshan	6^{3}	6	[10]
(Slovakia) V Bruthans (Slovakia) M Semjan	7	1	[11]
(Germany) Florian Fallert (Germany) N Langer	5	6	[13]
WC	(Netherlands) S Groen (Germany) Marko Zelch	3	5
2	(Romania) A Dăescu (Romania) F Mergea	6	7

Quarterfinals
(Argentina) P Galdón (Argentina) M Trungelliti	1	6^{4}
(Spain) Jordi Marsé-Vidri (Spain) C Poch-Gradin	6	7^{7}
(Germany) A Satschko (Croatia) F Škugor	4	4
(Russia) A Kuznetsov (New Zealand) J Statham	6	6
(Germany) K Krawietz (Germany) D Meffert	6	7^{8}
4	(Australia) A Hubble (Australia) N Roshan	4	6^{6}
(Germany) Florian Fallert (Germany) N Langer	2	3
2	(Romania) A Dăescu (Romania) F Mergea	6	6

Semifinals
(Spain) Jordi Marsé-Vidri (Spain) C Poch-Gradin	4	6	[3]
(Russia) A Kuznetsov (New Zealand) J Statham	6	3	[10]
(Germany) K Krawietz (Germany) D Meffert	6	2	[9]
2	(Romania) A Dăescu (Romania) F Mergea	3	6	[11]

Final
(Russia) A Kuznetsov (New Zealand) J Statham	6^{4}	6^{1}
2	(Romania) A Dăescu (Romania) F Mergea	7^{7}	7^{7}
