= 2006 Western & Southern Financial Group Masters – Singles =

Singles
- 2006 Western & Southern Financial Group Masters

Final
- Champion: (United States) Andy Roddick
- Runner-up: (Spain) Juan Carlos Ferrero
- Score: 6–3, 6–4

Details
- Draw: 64 (4WC/8Q/2LL)
- Seeds: 16

Events
| Singles | Doubles |
- Cincinnati Open

Andy Roddick defeated Juan Carlos Ferrero in the final, 6–3, 6–4 to win the men's singles tennis title at the 2006 Cincinnati Masters.

Roger Federer was the defending champion, but lost in the second round to Andy Murray. It would be Federer's only defeat prior to a tournament final that season. As Murray reached the quarterfinals in this tournament, he entered the top 20 for the first time in his career at No. 19.

== Seeds ==
1. (Switzerland) Roger Federer (second round)
2. (Spain) Rafael Nadal (quarterfinals)
3. (Argentina) David Nalbandian (second round)
4. (Croatia) Ivan Ljubičić (quarterfinals)
5. (Russia) Nikolay Davydenko (first round)
6. (United States) James Blake (second round)
7. (Spain) Tommy Robredo (semifinals)
8. (Cyprus) Marcos Baghdatis (third round)
9. (United States) Andy Roddick (champion)
10. (Spain) David Ferrer (quarterfinals)
11. (Czech Republic) Tomáš Berdych (first round)
12. (Finland) Jarkko Nieminen (first round)
13. (Chile) Fernando González (semifinals)
14. (Germany) Tommy Haas (third round)
15. (United States) Robby Ginepri (third round)
16. (Slovakia) Dominik Hrbatý (third round)

== Draw ==
Key

- Q = Qualifier
- WC = Wild card
- LL = Lucky loser
- Alt = Alternate
- ITF = ITF entry
- PR = Protected ranking
- SR = Special ranking
- SE = Special exempt
- JE = Junior exempt
- JR = Junior Accelerator Programme entrant
- CO = College Accelerator Programme entrant
- NG = Next Gen Accelerator Program entrant
- w/o = Walkover
- r = Retired
- d = Defaulted

=== Finals ===
Quarterfinals
(United Kingdom) Andy Murray | 3 | 4
9 | (United States) Andy Roddick | 6 | 6
13 | (Chile) Fernando González | 6 | 6
10 | (Spain) David Ferrer | 2 | 4
7 | (Spain) Tommy Robredo | 7^{8} | 6
4 | (Croatia) Ivan Ljubičić | 6^{6} | 2
(Spain) Juan Carlos Ferrero | 7^{7} | 7^{7}
2 | (Spain) Rafael Nadal | 6^{2} | 6^{3}

Semifinals
9 | (United States) Andy Roddick | 6 | 6
13 | (Chile) Fernando González | 3 | 3
7 | (Spain) Tommy Robredo | 3 | 4
(Spain) Juan Carlos Ferrero | 6 | 6

Final
9 | (United States) Andy Roddick | 6 | 6
(Spain) Juan Carlos Ferrero | 3 | 4

=== Top half ===
==== Section 1 ====
First round
1 | (Switzerland) R Federer | 7 | 6
(Thailand) P Srichaphan | 5 | 4
(United Kingdom) A Murray | 4 | 6 | 7
(United Kingdom) T Henman | 6 | 4 | 5
(France) S Grosjean | 6 | 4 | 3
(Russia) D Tursunov | 4 | 6 | 6
(France) P-H Mathieu | 6 | 3 | 4
15 | (United States) R Ginepri | 1 | 6 | 6
9 | (United States) A Roddick | 6^{6} | 7^{7} | 7^{7}
(Italy) D Bracciali | 7^{8} | 6^{4} | 6^{5}
Q | (France) M Gicquel | 6^{7} | 6^{3}
(Belgium) K Vliegen | 7^{9} | 7^{7}
Q | (United States) V Spadea | 6 | 6
Q | (Italy) A Seppi | 4 | 3
(Argentina) J I Chela | 6 | 2 | 6
5 | (Russia) N Davydenko | 4 | 6 | 2

Second round
1 | (Switzerland) R Federer | 5 | 4
(United Kingdom) A Murray | 7 | 6
(Russia) D Tursunov | 3 | 4
15 | (United States) R Ginepri | 6 | 6
9 | (United States) A Roddick | 6 | 6
(Belgium) K Vliegen | 4 | 4
Q | (United States) V Spadea | 7^{7} | 5 | 2
(Argentina) J I Chela | 6^{5} | 7 | 6

Third round
(United Kingdom) A Murray | 7^{7} | 2 | 6
15 | (United States) R Ginepri | 6^{3} | 6 | 4
9 | (United States) A Roddick | 6 | 6
(Argentina) J I Chela | 3 | 4

Quarterfinals
(United Kingdom) A Murray | 3 | 4
9 | (United States) A Roddick | 6 | 6

==== Section 2 ====
First round
3 | (Argentina) D Nalbandian | 6 | 6
Q | (South Africa) R de Voest | 0 | 4
WC | (Switzerland) S Wawrinka | 5 | 6 | 6
(Argentina) J Acasuso | 7 | 4 | 1
WC | (United States) M Fish | 6 | 6
Q | (France) N Mahut | 1 | 3
(Chile) N Massú | 4 | 4
13 | (Chile) F González | 6 | 6
10 | (Spain) D Ferrer | 6 | 6
(Spain) C Moyà | 3 | 1
(Spain) A Martín | 3 | 3
(Spain) N Almagro | 6 | 6
(France) G Monfils | 6 | 7
(Russia) M Safin | 4 | 5
(Sweden) T Johansson | 6^{3} | 6^{3}
8 | (Cyprus) M Baghdatis | 7^{7} | 7^{7}

Second round
3 | (Argentina) D Nalbandian | 4 | 2
WC | (Switzerland) S Wawrinka | 6 | 6
WC | (United States) M Fish | 5 | 5
13 | (Chile) F González | 7 | 7
10 | (Spain) D Ferrer | 4 | 7^{7} | 6
(Spain) N Almagro | 6 | 6^{1} | 0
(France) G Monfils | 6^{8} | 6 | 1
8 | (Cyprus) M Baghdatis | 7^{10} | 2 | 6

Third round
WC | (Switzerland) S Wawrinka | 6^{2} | 5
13 | (Chile) F González | 7^{7} | 7
10 | (Spain) D Ferrer | 7 | 6
8 | (Cyprus) M Baghdatis | 5 | 4

Quarterfinals
13 | (Chile) F González | 6 | 6
10 | (Spain) D Ferrer | 2 | 4

=== Bottom half ===
==== Section 3 ====
First round
7 | (Spain) T Robredo | 7 | 7
(France) R Gasquet | 5 | 5
(Belarus) M Mirnyi | 7 | 4 | 6
(Belgium) X Malisse | 5 | 6 | 3
(France) F Serra | 6 | 6
(France) J Benneteau | 3 | 3
(Serbia) N Djokovic | 7^{7} | 6
12 | (Finland) J Nieminen | 6^{5} | 4
16 | (Slovakia) D Hrbatý | 6 | 6
WC | (United States) P Goldstein | 4 | 3
LL | (Czech Republic) R Vik | 3 | 7^{7} | 3
Q | (Italy) D Sanguinetti | 6 | 6^{4} | 6
(Russia) M Youzhny | 6 | 6
(Germany) B Phau | 2 | 3
(United Kingdom) G Rusedski | 3 | 4
4 | (Croatia) I Ljubičić | 6 | 6

Second round
7 | (Spain) T Robredo | 6 | 6
(Belarus) M Mirnyi | 4 | 4
(France) F Serra | 6 | 6
(Serbia) N Djokovic | 3 | 4
16 | (Slovakia) D Hrbatý | 6 | 6
Q | (Italy) D Sanguinetti | 3 | 2
(Russia) M Youzhny | 4 | 6^{5}
4 | (Croatia) I Ljubičić | 6 | 7^{7}

Third round
7 | (Spain) T Robredo | 6 | 6
(France) F Serra | 3 | 1
16 | (Slovakia) D Hrbatý | 5 | 4
4 | (Croatia) I Ljubičić | 7 | 6

Quarterfinals
7 | (Spain) T Robredo | 7^{8} | 6
4 | (Croatia) I Ljubičić | 6^{6} | 2

==== Section 4 ====
First round
6 | (United States) J Blake | 6 | 6
(France) F Santoro | 4 | 4
(Sweden) J Björkman | 6^{r}
(Spain) J C Ferrero | 6
Q | (United States) J Gimelstob | 6 | 7^{7}
(Spain) F López | 3 | 6^{4}
(Sweden) R Söderling | 6 | 6
11 | (Czech Republic) T Berdych | 4 | 3
14 | (Germany) T Haas | 6 | 6
(Spain) F Verdasco | 3 | 4
LL | (Czech Republic) L Dlouhý | 4 | 4
(France) G Simon | 6 | 6
Q | (South Korea) H-T Lee | 6 | 6
(France) A Clément | 4 | 4
WC | (United States) S Querrey | 7^{7} | 2 | 3
2 | (Spain) R Nadal | 6^{5} | 6 | 6

Second round
6 | (United States) J Blake | 2 | 4
(Spain) J C Ferrero | 6 | 6
Q | (United States) J Gimelstob | 3 | 6 | 6^{6}
(Sweden) R Söderling | 6 | 2 | 7^{8}
14 | (Germany) T Haas | 6 | 4 | 6
(France) G Simon | 3 | 6 | 4
Q | (South Korea) H-T Lee | 4 | 3
2 | (Spain) R Nadal | 6 | 6

Third round
(Spain) J C Ferrero | 7 | 6
(Sweden) R Söderling | 5 | 4
14 | (Germany) T Haas | 6^{5} | 3
2 | (Spain) R Nadal | 7^{7} | 6

Quarterfinals
(Spain) J C Ferrero | 7^{7} | 7^{7}
2 | (Spain) R Nadal | 6^{2} | 6^{3}

== Qualifying ==
=== Qualifying seeds ===
1. (France) Nicolas Mahut (qualified)
2. (Italy) Davide Sanguinetti (qualified)
3. (Italy) Andreas Seppi (qualified)
4. (Czech Republic) Robin Vik (qualifying competition, lucky loser)
5. (South Africa) Wesley Moodie (first round)
6. (United States) Justin Gimelstob (qualified)
7. (South Korea) Lee Hyung-taik (qualified)
8. (France) Marc Gicquel (qualified)
9. (United States) Vince Spadea (qualified)
10. (Czech Republic) Lukáš Dlouhý (qualifying competition, lucky loser)
11. (United States) Kevin Kim (qualifying competition)
12. (Ecuador) Nicolás Lapentti (first round)
13. (Czech Republic) Jan Hernych (qualifying competition)
14. (Denmark) Kristian Pless (first round)
15. (Germany) Denis Gremelmayr (first round)
16. (South Africa) Rik de Voest (qualified)

=== Qualifiers ===
1. (France) Nicolas Mahut
2. (Italy) Davide Sanguinetti
3. (Italy) Andreas Seppi
4. (United States) Vince Spadea
5. (South Africa) Rik de Voest
6. (United States) Justin Gimelstob
7. (South Korea) Lee Hyung-taik
8. (France) Marc Gicquel

=== Lucky losers ===
1. (Czech Republic) Robin Vik
2. (Czech Republic) Lukáš Dlouhý

=== Qualifying draw ===
==== First qualifier ====
First round
1 | (France) Nicolas Mahut | 6 | 5 | 6
(Russia) Evgeny Korolev | 4 | 7 | 4
(Switzerland) George Bastl | 6 | 6^{2} | 6
12 | (Ecuador) Nicolás Lapentti | 1 | 7^{7} | 3

Qualifying competition
1 | (France) Nicolas Mahut | 6 | 6
(Switzerland) George Bastl | 4 | 4

==== Second qualifier ====
First round
2 | (Italy) Davide Sanguinetti | 4 | 6 | 6
(Switzerland) Marco Chiudinelli | 6 | 3 | 4
(Australia) Nathan Healey | 6 | 6
15 | (Germany) Denis Gremelmayr | 4 | 0

Qualifying competition
2 | (Italy) Davide Sanguinetti | 6 | 6
(Australia) Nathan Healey | 1 | 2

==== Third qualifier ====
First round
3 | (Italy) Andreas Seppi | 5 | 6 | 7^{7}
Alt | (United States) Rajeev Ram | 7 | 0 | 6^{3}
(Serbia) Viktor Troicki | 7 | 7^{7}
14 | (Denmark) Kristian Pless | 5 | 6^{3}

Qualifying competition
3 | (Italy) Andreas Seppi | 6 | 4
(Serbia) Viktor Troicki | 3 | 2^{r}

==== Fourth qualifier ====
First round
4 | (Czech Republic) Robin Vik | 6 | 6
WC | (United States) Michael McClune | 1 | 4
(Russia) Teymuraz Gabashvili | 3 | 3
9 | (United States) Vince Spadea | 6 | 6

Qualifying competition
4 | (Czech Republic) Robin Vik | 1 | 6 | 1
9 | (United States) Vince Spadea | 6 | 1 | 6

==== Fifth qualifier ====
First round
5 | (South Africa) Wesley Moodie | 3 | 5
WC | (Serbia) Nenad Zimonjić | 6 | 7
(United States) Jesse Witten | 0 | 2
16 | (South Africa) Rik de Voest | 6 | 6

Qualifying competition
WC | (Serbia) Nenad Zimonjić | 6^{5} | 4
16 | (South Africa) Rik de Voest | 7^{7} | 6

==== Sixth qualifier ====
First round
6 | (United States) Justin Gimelstob | 7 | 0 | 6
Alt | (Czech Republic) Leoš Friedl | 5 | 6 | 2
WC | (Czech Republic) František Čermák | 5 | 2
10 | (Czech Republic) Lukáš Dlouhý | 7 | 6

Qualifying competition
6 | (United States) Justin Gimelstob | 6 | 6
10 | (Czech Republic) Lukáš Dlouhý | 0 | 2

==== Seventh qualifier ====
First round
7 | (South Korea) Lee Hyung-taik | 7^{9} | 6
(Colombia) Alejandro Falla | 6^{7} | 4
Alt | (Australia) Luke Bourgeois | 2 | 2
13 | (Czech Republic) Jan Hernych | 6 | 6

Qualifying competition
7 | (South Korea) Lee Hyung-taik | 7^{7} | 4 | 6
13 | (Czech Republic) Jan Hernych | 6^{4} | 6 | 4

==== Eighth qualifier ====
First round
8 | (France) Marc Gicquel | 7^{7} | 6
(Australia) Wayne Arthurs | 6^{3} | 4
WC | (Austria) Julian Knowle | 4 | 6^{5}
11 | (United States) Kevin Kim | 6 | 7^{7}

Qualifying competition
8 | (France) Marc Gicquel | 6 | 6
11 | (United States) Kevin Kim | 4 | 2
