= Michael Berrer =

German tennis player

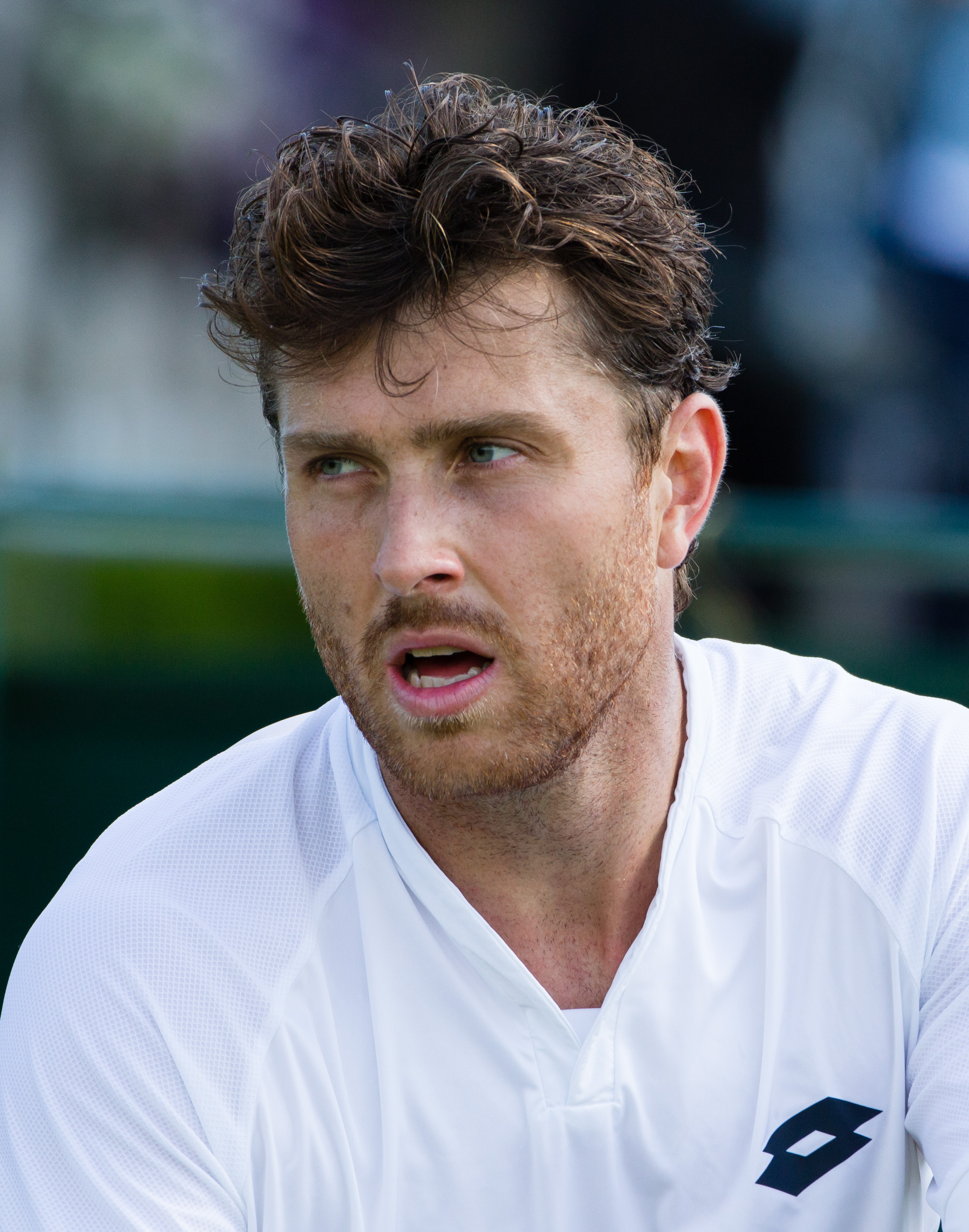
- Country (sports): Germany
- Residence: Stuttgart, Germany
- Born: 1 July 1980 (age 45) Stuttgart, West Germany
- Height: 1.93 m (6 ft 4 in)
- Turned pro: 1999
- Retired: 2016
- Plays: Left-handed (one-handed backhand)
- Prize money: $2,766,701

Singles
- Career record: 88–145
- Career titles: 0
- Highest ranking: No. 42 (24 May 2010)

Grand Slam singles results
- Australian Open: 2R (2008, 2009, 2010, 2014)
- French Open: 3R (2011)
- Wimbledon: 2R (2007)
- US Open: 2R (2007)

Doubles
- Career record: 24–30
- Career titles: 1
- Highest ranking: No. 134 (2 March 2009)

Grand Slam doubles results
- Australian Open: 2R (2011)
- French Open: 1R (2011)
- Wimbledon: 2R (2007)
- US Open: 1R (2010)
- Last updated on: 9 January 2023.

Michael Berrer (born 1 July 1980) is a German retired professional tennis player. He reached his career-high singles ranking of world No. 42 in May 2010.

== Career ==
=== 2010 ===
He reached the quarterfinal at the Aircel Chennai Open in January, losing to Stanislas Wawrinka in the quarterfinals. At the 2010 Australian Open he was defeated by Denis Istomin in the second round after beating Kristof Vliegen in straight sets. In the second week of the Australian Open, he played at Heilbronn Challenger. He won the tournament after defeating Andrey Golubev in two sets. The following week he reached his first ATP World Tour final at the PBZ Zagreb Indoors, which he lost to Marin Čilić 4–6, 7–6^{(5)}, 3–6.

At the Dubai Tennis Championships in February, he defeated Sergiy Stakhovsky and Nikolay Davydenko to reach the third round, where he lost to Marcos Baghdatis, 6–7^{(5)}, 1–6. He lost the opener at the BNP Paribas Open in Indian Wells to Mardy Fish in three sets. He won the first round of the Sony Ericsson Open in Miami, before falling to Feliciano López in the second round. At his first clay court tournament of the year in Monte-Carlo, he beat Evgeny Korolev and Juan Mónaco en route to a third-round showdown against Rafael Nadal, which he lost, 0–6, 1–6. After this, he lost his next three opening matches.

At the French Open, he was again knocked out in the first round by Mardy Fish in five sets. He then suffered from an ankle injury. He made his next appearance in Wimbledon one month later, where he had to retire during his first-round match against Illya Marchenko. He then experienced two more first-round exits in Stuttgart and Hamburg in July.

In August, he reached the second round at the Legg Mason Tennis Classic, losing to Fernando Verdasco. Two weeks later he defeated Tommy Robredo at the ATP World Tour Masters 1000 in Cincinnati, before losing to Richard Gasquet in two sets. At the 2010 US Open, Berrer fell to countryman Andreas Beck in the first round, 6–7^{(3)}, 3–6, 1–6.

In September, he reached the second round of the Open de Moselle in Metz, after beating Rainer Schüttler in two sets. He lost to Philipp Kohlschreiber, 4–6, 2–6. As no. 51, he qualified for the China Open in Beijing. In the first round of the main draw he defeated world no. 7 Tomáš Berdych in three sets, before losing to Gilles Simon, 7–6, 4–6, 6–7, in over three hours. Berrer beat Guillermo García López, Pablo Cuevas, and Marcos Baghdatis en route to the semifinal in Vienna, where he lost to Austrian lucky loser Andreas Haider-Maurer.

=== 2011 ===
At the start of 2011, he again reached the Zagreb final, where he was defeated by Ivan Dodig in straight sets. He won his first Grand Slam match at the 2011 French Open against 26th seed Milos Raonic, before beating Arnaud Clément in the second round. In the third round, he was defeated 6–2, 6–3, 6–2 by Britain's Andy Murray.

=== 2015 ===
At the start of 2015, Berrer confirmed that it would be his last year as a pro. At the 2015 Qatar Open, he beat world number 3 Rafael Nadal 1–6, 6–3, 6–4 in the first round, after coming from a set down.

=== 2016 ===
At the start of 2016, Michael changed his mind and started his 17th season on tour.

At the 2016 Open Sud de France, he beat world number 38 Borna Ćorić 7–6, 6–2 and Kenny de Schepper 6–3, 6–4 to reach a quarterfinal, where he lost to another young gun a countryman Alexander Zverev 7–6, 2–6, 5–7.

== ATP career finals ==
=== Singles: 2 (2 runner-ups) ===
Legend Grand Slam Tournaments (0–0) ATP World Tour Finals (0–0) ATP Masters 1000 Series (0–0) ATP 500 Series (0–0) ATP 250 Series (0–2)	Finals by surface Hard (0–2) Clay (0–0) Grass (0–0) Carpet (0–0)	Finals by setting Outdoors (0–0) Indoors (0–2)

Result	W–L	Date	Tournament	Tier	Surface	Opponent	Score
Loss	0–1	Feb 2010	Zagreb, Croatia	250 Series	Hard	(Croatia) Marin Čilić	4–6, 7–6^{(7–5)}, 3–6
Loss	0–2	Feb 2011	Zagreb, Croatia	250 Series	Hard	(Croatia) Ivan Dodig	3–6, 4–6

=== Doubles: 3 (1 title, 2 runner-ups) ===
Legend Grand Slam Tournaments (0–0) ATP World Tour Finals (0–0) ATP Masters 1000 Series (0–0) ATP 500 Series (0–1) ATP 250 Series (1–1)	Finals by surface Hard (0–1) Clay (1–1) Grass (0–0) Carpet (0–0)	Finals by setting Outdoors (1–2) Indoors (0–0)

Result	W–L	Date	Tournament	Tier	Surface	Partner	Opponents	Score
Loss	0–1	Sep 2006	Beijing, China	International Series	Hard	(Denmark) Kenneth Carlsen	(Croatia) Mario Ančić (India) Mahesh Bhupathi	4–6, 3–6
Win	1–1	May 2008	Munich, Germany	International Series	Clay	(Germany) Rainer Schüttler	(United States) Scott Lipsky (United States) David Martin	7–5, 3–6, [10–8]
Loss	1–2	Jul 2008	Stuttgart, Germany	Championship Series	Clay	(Germany) Mischa Zverev	(Germany) Christopher Kas (Germany) Philipp Kohlschreiber	3–6, 4–6

== ATP Challenger and ITF Futures finals ==
=== Singles: 19 (12–7) ===
Legend ATP Challenger (11–6) ITF Futures (1–1)	Finals by surface Hard (11–4) Clay (0–3) Grass (0–0) Carpet (1–0)

Result	W–L	Date	Tournament	Tier	Surface	Opponent	Score
Win	1–0	Apr 2003	Qatar F1, Doha	Futures	Hard	(Slovakia) Ivo Klec	6–3, 6–3
Loss	1–1	Oct 2003	France F19, Sarreguemines	Futures	Hard	(France) Gary Lugassy	7–6^{(18–16)}, 1–6, 1–6
Win	2–1	Aug 2005	Segovia, Spain	Challenger	Hard	(Chinese Taipei) Jimmy Wang	7–5, 6–7^{(6–8)}, 6–1
Loss	2–2	Sep 2005	Istanbul, Turkey	Challenger	Hard	(Chinese Taipei) Jimmy Wang	6–4, 4–6, 3–6
Win	3–2	Nov 2005	Eckental, Germany	Challenger	Carpet	(Belgium) Steve Darcis	6–3, 4–6, 6–4
Loss	3–3	Jun 2006	Ettlingen, Germany	Challenger	Clay	(Germany) Simon Greul	4–6, 3–6
Win	4–3	Nov 2006	Helsinki, Finland	Challenger	Hard	(Czech Republic) Tomáš Zíb	6–2, 3–6, 6–3
Win	5–3	Jan 2007	Heilbronn, Germany	Challenger	Hard	(France) Michaël Llodra	6–5 ret.
Loss	5–4	Apr 2007	Chiasso, Switzerland	Challenger	Clay	(Austria) Werner Eschauer	3–6, 2–6
Win	6–4	Feb 2009	Wrocław, Poland	Challenger	Hard	(Russia) Alexander Kudryavtsev	6–3, 6–4
Win	7–4	Nov 2009	Bratislava, Slovakia	Challenger	Hard	(Slovakia) Dominik Hrbatý	6–7^{(6–8)}, 6–4, 7–6^{(7–3)}
Win	8–4	Dec 2009	Salzburg, Austria	Challenger	Hard	(Finland) Jarkko Nieminen	6–7^{(4–7)}, 6–4, 6–4
Win	9–4	Jan 2010	Heilbronn, Germany	Challenger	Hard	(Kazakhstan) Andrey Golubev	6–3, 7–6^{(7–4)}
Win	10–4	Jan 2013	Heilbronn, Germany	Challenger	Hard	(Germany) Jan-Lennard Struff	7–5 6–3
Win	11–4	Oct 2013	Mouilleron-Le-Captif, France	Challenger	Hard	(France) Nicolas Mahut	1–6, 6–4, 6–3
Loss	11–5	Mar 2014	Kazan, Russia	Challenger	Hard	(Turkey) Marsel xlhan	6–7^{(6–8)}, 3–6
Loss	11–6	Jul 2014	Oberstaufen, Germany	Challenger	Clay	(Italy) Simone Bolelli	4–6, 6–7^{(2–7)}
Loss	11–7	Nov 2015	Andria, Italy	Challenger	Hard	(Croatia) Ivan Dodig	2–6, 1–6
Win	12–7	Apr 2016	León, Mexico	Challenger	Hard	(Brazil) João Souza	6–3, 6–2

=== Doubles: 5 (0–5) ===
Legend ATP Challenger (0–4) ITF Futures (0–1)	Finals by surface Hard (0–2) Clay (0–3) Grass (0–0) Carpet (0–0)

Result	W–L	Date	Tournament	Tier	Surface	Partner	Opponents	Score
Loss	0–1	Sep 2003	France F16, Mulhouse	Futures	Hard	(Switzerland) Roman Valent	(France) Gary Lugassy (France) Jean-Michel Pequery	0–6, 2–6
Loss	0–2	May 2004	Forest Hills, United States	Challenger	Clay	(Chinese Taipei) Jimmy Wang	(United States) Jason Marshall (Brazil) Bruno Soares	6–7^{(5–7)}, 3–6
Loss	0–3	Oct 2004	Grenoble, France	Challenger	Hard	(Romania) Răzvan Sabău	(Italy) Uros Vico (Croatia) Lovro Zovko	2–6, 4–6
Loss	0–4	Jun 2007	Karlsruhe, Germany	Challenger	Clay	(Portugal) Răzvan Sabău	(United States) Alex Kuznetsov (Germany) Mischa Zverev	4–6, 7–6^{(8–6)}, [4–10]
Loss	0–5	Jul 2009	Oberstaufen, Germany	Challenger	Clay	(Austria) Philipp Oswald	(Germany) Dieter Kindlmann (Germany) Marcel Zimmermann	4–6, 6–2, [4–10]

== Performance timeline ==
Key
W	F	SF	QF	#R	RR	Q#	P#	DNQ	A	Z#	PO	G	S	B	NMS	NTI	P	NH

(W) winner; (F) finalist; (SF) semifinalist; (QF) quarterfinalist; (#R) rounds 4, 3, 2, 1; (RR) round-robin stage; (Q#) qualification round; (P#) preliminary round; (DNQ) did not qualify; (A) absent; (Z#) Davis/Fed Cup Zonal Group (with number indication) or (PO) play-off; (G) gold, (S) silver or (B) bronze Olympic/Paralympic medal; (NMS) not a Masters tournament; (NTI) not a Tier I tournament; (P) postponed; (NH) not held; (SR) strike rate (events won / competed); (W–L) win–loss record.

=== Singles ===
Tournament	2002	2003	2004	2005	2006	2007	2008	2009	2010	2011	2012	2013	2014	2015	2016	SR	W–L	Win%
Grand Slam tournaments
Australian Open	A	A	A	A	Q2	1R	2R	2R	2R	1R	A	Q3	2R	Q2	Q2	0 / 6	4–6	40%
French Open	A	A	Q1	Q2	Q1	Q2	1R	Q1	1R	3R	2R	Q2	Q2	1R	Q1	0 / 5	3–5	38%
Wimbledon	A	A	Q2	Q2	1R	2R	1R	A	1R	1R	Q1	Q3	Q1	1R	Q2	0 / 6	1–6	14%
US Open	A	A	Q3	Q3	1R	2R	1R	1R	1R	1R	Q2	A	A	1R	Q2	0 / 7	1–7	13%
Win–loss	0–0	0–0	0–0	0–0	0–2	2–3	1–4	1–2	1–4	2–4	1–1	0–0	1–1	0–3	0–0	0 / 24	9–24	27%
ATP Tour Masters 1000
Indian Wells	A	A	A	A	A	A	1R	2R	1R	2R	A	Q2	A	3R	2R	0 / 6	5–6	45%
Miami	A	A	A	A	Q2	A	2R	Q2	2R	1R	A	Q1	A	1R	A	0 / 4	2–4	33%
Monte Carlo	A	A	A	A	Q1	A	A	A	3R	Q1	Q2	A	Q1	A	A	0 / 1	2–1	67%
Madrid	A	A	A	A	A	A	A	A	A	A	Q1	A	Q1	Q1	A	0 / 0	0–0	–
Rome	A	A	A	A	A	A	A	A	1R	A	A	A	Q1	A	A	0 / 1	0–1	0%
Hamburg	Q1	A	A	A	Q2	Q1	1R	Not Masters Series								0 / 1	0–1	0%
Canada	A	A	A	A	A	A	A	Q1	1R	A	1R	A	A	A	A	0 / 2	0–2	0%
Cincinnati	A	A	A	A	A	A	A	A	2R	A	A	A	A	A	A	0 / 1	1–1	50%
Shanghai	Not Held							A	1R	A	1R	A	A	Q2	Q2	0 / 2	0–2	0%
Paris	A	A	A	A	A	Q1	A	Q1	1R	A	A	A	A	Q1	A	0 / 1	0–1	0%
Win–loss	0–0	0–0	0–0	0–0	0–0	0–0	1–3	1–1	4–8	1–2	0–2	0–0	0–0	2–2	1–1	0 / 19	10–19	34%

== Wins over top 10 players ==
#	Player	Rank	Event	Surface	Rd	Score	Rank
2010
1.	(Russia) Nikolay Davydenko	No. 6	Dubai, United Arab Emirates	Hard	2R	6–3, ret.	56
2.	(Czech Republic) Tomáš Berdych	No. 7	Beijing, China	Hard	1R	4–6, 7–5, 6–4	51
2015
3.	(Spain) Rafael Nadal	No. 3	Doha, Qatar	Hard	1R	1–6, 6–3, 6–4	127
