= Jan Minář =

Czech tennis player (born 1981)

- Country (sports): Czech Republic
- Residence: Prague, Czech Republic
- Born: 9 April 1981 (age 44) Prague, Czechoslovakia
- Height: 1.89 m (6 ft 2 in)
- Turned pro: 1999
- Plays: Right-handed (2-handed backhand)
- Prize money: $270,701

Singles
- Career record: 0–2
- Career titles: 0
- Highest ranking: No. 177 (5 May 2008)

Grand Slam singles results
- Australian Open: Q2 (2010)
- French Open: Q2 (2010)
- Wimbledon: Q2 (2005, 2008)
- US Open: 1R (2008)

Doubles
- Career record: 1–1
- Career titles: 0
- Highest ranking: No. 335 (9 March 2009)

Jan Minář (born 9 April 1981) is a professional Czech tennis player. His brother Ivo is also a professional player.

== Singles finals ==
=== Wins (6) ===
Legend (singles)
Grand Slam (0)
Tennis Masters Cup (0)
ATP Masters Series (0)
ATP Tour (0)
Challengers (1)
Futures (5)

No.	Date	Tournament	Surface	Opponent	Score
1.	Aug 2004	S Tennis Masters Challenger, Graz, Austria	Hard	(France) Gilles Simon	3–6, 6–3, 7–5
2.	Aug 2006	Poznań, Poland	Clay	(Czech Republic) Lukáš Rosol	6–4, 6–3
3.	Apr 2007	Antalya, Turkey	Clay	(Germany) Marcel Zimmermann	^{2}6–7, 6–4, 6–4
4.	Apr 2007	Antalya, Turkey	Clay	(North Macedonia) Predrag Rusevski	6–3, 6–2
5.	May 2007	Jablonec, Czech Republic	Hard	(Czech Republic) Michal Tabara	7–6^{5}, 6–3
6.	Apr 2009	Andijan, Uzbekistan	Hard	(Uzbekistan) Murad Inoyatov	3–6, 7–6^{3}, 6–3

=== Runners-up (9) ===
No.	Date	Tournament	Surface	Opponent in the final	Score
1.	Feb 2003	Blenheim, New Zealand	Hard	(Czech Republic) Ivo Minář	6–4, 6–2
2.	Jun 2003	Tbilisi, Georgia	Clay	(Russia) Teymuraz Gabashvili	6–4, 6–1
5.	Sep 2003	Plaisir, France	Hard	(France) Jean-Michel Pequery	7–5, 7–6^{9}
4.	Jun 2004	Kassel, Germany	Clay	(Morocco) Mounir El Aarej	6–2, 6–4
5.	May 2005	Zagreb Open, Zagreb, Croatia	Clay	(Croatia) Ivan Ljubičić	6–4, 6–2
6.	May 2007	Bournemouth, United Kingdom	Clay	(France) Laurent Recouderc	7–6^{3}, 6–4
7.	May 2007	Katowice, Poland	Clay	(Australia) Rameez Junaid	2–6, 7–5, 6–2
8.	Mar 2009	The Caversham International, Jersey	Hard (i)	(United Kingdom) Daniel Evans	6–3, 6–2
9.	Jul 2009	Oberstaufen Cup, Oberstaufen, Germany	Clay	(Czech Republic) Robin Vik	6–1, 6–2

== Doubles finals ==
=== Wins (2) ===
Legend (doubles)
Grand Slam (0)
Tennis Masters Cup (0)
ATP Masters Series (0)
ATP Tour (0)
Challengers (1)
Futures (1)

No.	Date	Tournament	Surface	Partner	Opponents in the final	Score
1.	November 11, 2002	Hrotovice, Czech Republic	Carpet	(Czech Republic) Marek Velička	(Czech Republic) Lukáš Dlouhý (Czech Republic) David Miketa	w/o
2.	July 21, 2008	Međugorje, Bosnia and Herzegovina	Clay	(Austria) Martin Slanar	(Spain) Pere Riba Madrid (Spain) Pablo Santos González	7–5, 6–3

=== Runners-up (3) ===
No.	Date	Tournament	Surface	Partner	Opponents in the final	Score
1.	November 23, 2004	Czech Indoor Open, Prague, Czech Republic	Carpet	(Czech Republic) Jaroslav Pospíšil	(Czech Republic) Lukáš Dlouhý (Slovakia) Igor Zelenay	6–3, 3–6, 7–6^{5}
2.	February 13, 2006	Belgrade, Serbia and Montenegro	Carpet	(Czech Republic) Ivo Minář	(Germany) Michael Kohlmann (Germany) Alexander Waske	7–6^{3}, 6–3
3.	September 21, 2009	Trnava, Slovakia	Clay	(Czech Republic) Lukáš Rosol	(Bulgaria) Grigor Dimitrov (Russia) Teymuraz Gabashvili	6–4, 2–6, [10–8]
