= Robin Vik =

Czech tennis player (born 1980)

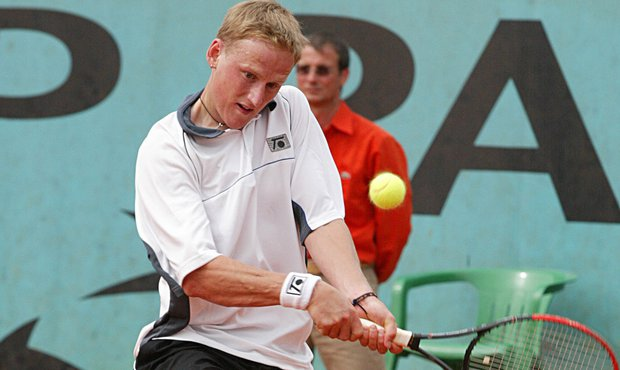
- Country (sports): Czech Republic
- Residence: Hradec Králové, Czech Republic
- Born: 5 February 1980 (age 45); Hradec Králové, Czechoslovakia
- Height: 6 ft 0 in (183 cm)
- Turned pro: 1998
- Retired: 2010
- Plays: Right-handed (two-handed backhand)
- Coach: David Prinosil
- Prize money: $700,030

Singles
- Career record: 20–38
- Career titles: 0
- Highest ranking: No. 57 (9 January 2006)

Grand Slam singles results
- Australian Open: 1R (2006)
- French Open: 2R (2005)
- Wimbledon: 1R (2006)
- US Open: 1R (2005, 2006)

Doubles
- Career record: 12–22
- Career titles: 0
- Highest ranking: No. 74 (8 January 2007)

Grand Slam doubles results
- Australian Open: 1R (2006)
- French Open: 2R (2006)
- Wimbledon: 3R (2006)
- US Open: 1R (2006)
- Last updated on: 2 July 2021.

Robin Vik (born 5 February 1980) is a Czech professional tennis player.

Vik turned professional in 1995 and he reached a career high ranking of World No. 57 in January 2006. Career highlight runs are reaching the semifinals of St. Petersburg in 2005 and the quarterfinals of Dubai and Munich in 2006. Notable victories include World No. 10 Gastón Gaudio at the 2006 World Team Cup in Düsseldorf, World No. 25 Tomáš Berdych at Dubai in 2006, World No. 27 and recent US Open semifinalist Mikhail Youzhny at St. Petersburg in 2005 and a declining World No. 27 and defending champion Guillermo Coria at Umag in 2006.

Vik was beaten in the first round of the 2006 Australian Open by Lleyton Hewitt in a tight 5-setter after leading 2 sets to 1.

== Performance timeline ==
Key
W	F	SF	QF	#R	RR	Q#	DNQ	A	NH

(W) winner; (F) finalist; (SF) semifinalist; (QF) quarterfinalist; (#R) rounds 4, 3, 2, 1; (RR) round-robin stage; (Q#) qualification round; (DNQ) did not qualify; (A) absent; (NH) not held; (SR) strike rate (events won / competed); (W–L) win–loss record.
To avoid confusion and double counting, these charts are updated at the conclusion of a tournament or when the player's participation has ended.

=== Singles ===
Tournament	2000	2001	2002	2003	2004	2005	2006	2007	SR	W–L	Win%
Grand Slam tournaments
Australian Open	A	Q1	A	A	A	A	1R	Q3	0 / 1	0–1	0%
French Open	A	A	A	A	A	2R	1R	Q2	0 / 2	1–2	33%
Wimbledon	A	Q1	A	Q2	A	Q1	1R	Q1	0 / 1	0–1	0%
US Open	Q1	Q1	A	Q2	A	1R	1R	A	0 / 2	0–2	0%
Win–loss	0–0	0–0	0–0	0–0	0–0	1–2	0–4	0–0	0 / 6	1–6	14%
ATP Tour Masters 1000
Indian Wells	A	A	A	A	A	A	1R	A	0 / 1	0–1	0%
Miami	A	A	A	A	A	A	2R	A	0 / 1	1–1	50%
Monte Carlo	A	A	A	A	A	A	A	Q1	0 / 0	0–0	–
Cincinnati Masters	A	A	A	A	A	A	1R	A	0 / 1	0–1	0%
Win–loss	0–0	0–0	0–0	0–0	0–0	0–0	1–3	0–0	0 / 3	1–3	25%

== ATP Challenger and ITF Futures finals ==
=== Singles: 13 (11–2) ===
Legend ATP Challenger (6–0) ITF Futures (5–2)	Finals by surface Hard (7–1) Clay (2–1) Grass (0–0) Carpet (2–0)

Result	W–L	Date	Tournament	Tier	Surface	Opponent	Score
Win	1–0	Jan 2005	Germany F1, Nussloch	Futures	Carpet	(Belgium) Steve Darcis	6–2, 6–3
Win	2–0	Jan 2005	Germany F3, Oberhaching	Futures	Hard	(Germany) Andreas Beck	7–6^{(7–3)}, 4–6, 6–1
Win	3–0	Feb 2005	Wrocław, Poland	Challenger	Hard	(Czech Republic) Michal Tabara	6–4, 6–3
Win	4–0	Feb 2005	Croatia F1, Zagreb	Futures	Hard	(Russia) Evgeny Kirillov	6–1, 6–1
Win	5–0	Mar 2005	Kyoto, Japan	Challenger	Carpet	(Czech Republic) Pavel Šnobel	6–4, 6–4
Win	6–0	Apr 2005	Nottingham, United Kingdom	Challenger	Hard	(United Kingdom) Jonathan Marray	6–3, 6–2
Win	7–0	Aug 2005	Graz, Austria	Challenger	Hard	(Croatia) Roko Karanušić	6–4, 4–2 ret.
Win	8–0	May 2006	Prague, Czech Republic	Challenger	Clay	(Czech Republic) Jan Hájek	6–4, 7–6^{(7–4)}
Loss	8–1	Oct 2008	Germany F22, Leimen	Futures	Hard	(Germany) Holger Fischer	3–6, 4–6
Win	9–1	Oct 2008	Germany F23, Isernhagen	Futures	Hard	(Austria) Armin Sandbichler	7–5, 6–4
Win	10–1	Dec 2008	Czech Republic F5, Frýdlant nad Ostravicí	Futures	Hard	(Czech Republic) Daniel Lustig	6–4, 6–2
Win	11–1	Jul 2009	Oberstaufen, Germany	Challenger	Clay	(Czech Republic) Jan Minar	6–1, 6–2
Loss	11–2	May 2010	Czech Republic F2, Most	Futures	Clay	(Germany) Dennis Bloemke	6–7^{(2–7)}, 1–6

=== Doubles: 8 (4–4) ===
Legend ATP Challenger (3–3) ITF Futures (1–1)	Finals by surface Hard (3–1) Clay (1–3) Grass (0–0) Carpet (0–0)

Result	W–L	Date	Tournament	Tier	Surface	Partner	Opponents	Score
Loss	0–1	Sep 1999	Freudenstadt, Germany	Challenger	Clay	(Czech Republic) Michal Tabara	(Spain) Joan Balcells (Austria) Thomas Strengberger	6–4, 2–6, 3–6
Loss	0–2	Oct 1999	Great Britain F10, Edinburgh	Futures	Hard	(Germany) Andreas Tattermusch	(United Kingdom) James Davidson (Sweden) Fredrik Lovén	3–6, 6–7
Loss	0–3	Jul 2002	Budaörs, Hungary	Challenger	Clay	(Czech Republic) Jiří Vaněk	(Chile) Hermes Gamonal (Chile) Adrián García	3–6, 6–0, 3–6
Win	1–3	Feb 2005	Croatia F1, Zagreb	Futures	Hard	(Czech Republic) Jakub Hasek	(Russia) Konstantin Kravchuk (Russia) Alexander Pavlioutchenkov	2–6, 7–6^{(7–2)}, 7–6^{(7–5)}
Win	2–3	Mar 2006	Sunrise, United States	Challenger	Hard	(Czech Republic) Petr Pála	(Russia) Dmitry Tursunov (United States) Goran Dragicevic	6–4, 6–2
Win	3–3	Mar 2007	Cherbourg, France	Challenger	Hard	(Slovakia) Michal Mertiňák	(Poland) Łukasz Kubot (Belgium) Dick Norman	6–2, 6–4
Loss	3–4	Apr 2007	Casablanca, Morocco	Challenger	Clay	(Slovakia) Michal Mertiňák	(Poland) Łukasz Kubot (Austria) Oliver Marach	3–6, 3–6
Win	4–4	May 2009	Ostrava, Czech Republic	Challenger	Clay	(Czech Republic) Jan Hájek	(Slovakia) Matus Horecny (Slovakia) Tomas Janci	6–2, 6–4
