= Guillaume Rufin =

French tennis player

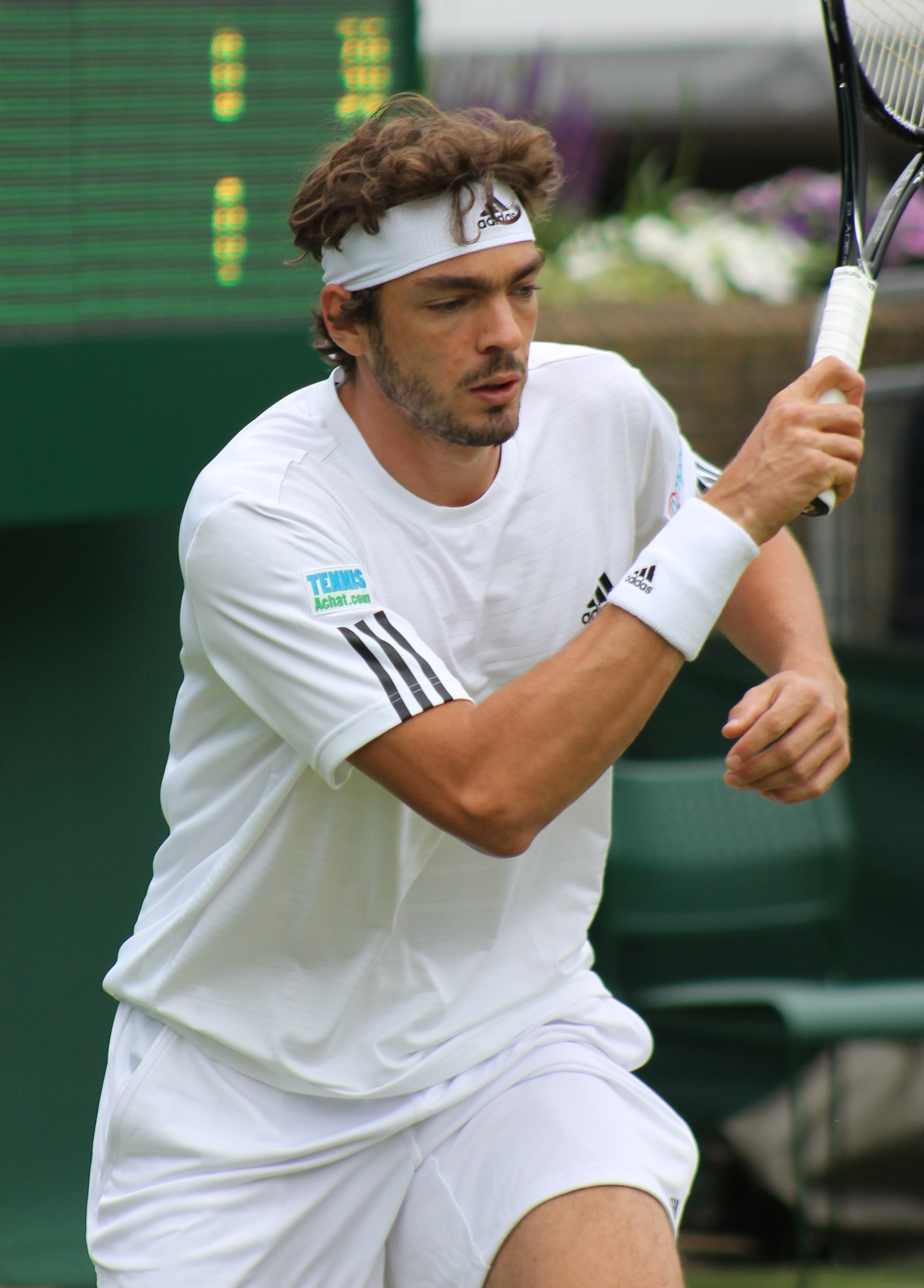
- Guillaume Rufin, Wimbledon 2013
- Country (sports): France
- Residence: Charnay, France
- Born: 26 May 1990 (age 35) Viriat, France
- Height: 1.88 m (6 ft 2 in)
- Turned pro: 2008
- Retired: 2015
- Plays: Right-handed (two-handed backhand)
- Prize money: $732,052

Singles
- Career record: 16–27
- Career titles: 0
- Highest ranking: No. 81 (9 September 2013)

Grand Slam singles results
- Australian Open: 2R (2013)
- French Open: 2R (2009, 2011)
- Wimbledon: 2R (2012, 2013)
- US Open: 2R (2010, 2013)

Doubles
- Career record: 4–4
- Career titles: 0
- Highest ranking: No. 316 (2 August 2010)

Grand Slam doubles results
- French Open: 3R (2010)
- Last updated on: 2 April 2017.

Guillaume Rufin (French pronunciation: [ɡijom ʁyfɛ̃]; born 26 May 1990) is a French former professional tennis player. His highest singles ranking is World No. 81, achieved in September 2013.

== Career ==
=== 2009 ===
He received a wildcard into the 2009 French Open, his ATP-tier debut. In the first round, one day before his 19th birthday, he beat Eduardo Schwank, 6–1, 6–3, 6–3.

Rufin achieved another landmark in his young career on 25 October 2009, when he won the Florianópolis Challenger title in Brazil, beating Pere Riba in the final, 6–4, 3–6, 6–3.

=== 2010 ===
He reached the quarterfinals of the 2010 Open 13 in Marseille. In the first round, Rufin defeated lucky loser Laurent Recouderc, 7–5, 4–6, 7–6. He followed this up by defeating Yannick Mertens of Belgium, 6–3, 2–6, 6–2. He eventually fell to World No. 92 Mischa Zverev, 7–5, 6–7, 6–3.

Rufin received a wildcard into the 2010 US Open and defeated Leonardo Mayer in four sets before losing to Paul-Henri Mathieu in the second round.

=== 2012 ===
2012 began well for Rufin, as he reached second ever ATP Quarter-Final in Montpellier. He defeated Canadian Vasek Pospisil 6–4 7–6 and Spaniard Feliciano López 7–6 6–3, before falling to compatriot Gilles Simon 6–7 7–6 2–6.

A strong end to the season on the ATP Challenger Tour saw Rufin enter the top 100 for the first time. Rufin's four week sojourn on the clay courts of South America comprised a win in Villa Allende, two finals in Quito and Buenos Aires and a Semin-Final in San Juan.

=== 2013 ===
Rufin reached the Quarter-Final of the ATP Tour event in Viña del Mar, defeating Spain's Rubén Ramírez Hidalgo 6–3 6–4 and Argentina's Juan Mónaco 7–6 6–4. He had to withdraw before his scheduled match with Carlos Berlocq.

=== 2015: Retirement ===
Rufin retired in spring 2015 due to persistent injuries.

== Challenger finals ==
=== Singles: 7 (3–4) ===
Legend
ATP Challenger Tour (3–4)

Outcome	No.	Date	Tournament	Surface	Opponent	Score
Winner	1.	25 October 2009	Florianópolis, Brazil	Clay	(Spain) Pere Riba	6–4, 3–6, 6–3
Runner-up	1.	15 July 2012	Timișoara, Romania	Clay	(Romania) Victor Hănescu	0–6, 3–6
Runner-up	2.	7 October 2012	Quito, Ecuador	Clay	(Brazil) João Souza	2–6, 6–7^{(4–7)}
Winner	2.	21 October 2012	Villa Allende, Argentina	Clay	(Spain) Javier Martí	6–2, 6–3
Runner-up	3.	28 October 2012	Buenos Aires, Argentina	Clay	(Argentina) Diego Schwartzman	1–6, 5–7
Winner	3.	28 July 2013	Oberstaufen, Germany	Clay	(Germany) Peter Gojowczyk	6–3, 6–4
Runner-up	4.	7 September 2014	Brașov, Romania	Clay	(Austria) Andreas Haider-Maurer	3–6, 2–6

Rufin serves to Tomáš Berdych at Rod Laver Arena during the 2013 Australian Open

=== Doubles: 1 (0–1) ===
Legend
ATP Challenger Tour (0–1)

Outcome	No.	Date	Tournament	Surface	Partner	Opponents	Score
Runner-up	1.	7 January 2012	Nouméa, New Caledonia	Hard	(France) Axel Michon	(Thailand) Sanchai Ratiwatana (Thailand) Sonchat Ratiwatana	0–6, 4–6

== Performance timelines ==
Key
W	F	SF	QF	#R	RR	Q#	DNQ	A	NH

(W) winner; (F) finalist; (SF) semifinalist; (QF) quarterfinalist; (#R) rounds 4, 3, 2, 1; (RR) round-robin stage; (Q#) qualification round; (DNQ) did not qualify; (A) absent; (NH) not held; (SR) strike rate (events won / competed); (W–L) win–loss record.
To avoid confusion and double counting, these charts are updated at the conclusion of a tournament or when the player's participation has ended.

=== Singles ===
Current until US Open.

Tournament	2008	2009	2010	2011	2012	2013	2014	2015	W–L
Grand Slams
Australian Open	A	A	1R	A	Q3	2R	A	A	1–2
French Open	Q1	2R	Q1	2R	1R	1R	A	Q1	2–4
Wimbledon	A	A	Q1	Q2	2R	2R	A		2–2
US Open	A	A	2R	Q3	1R	2R	A		2–3
Win–loss	0–0	1–1	1–2	1–1	1–3	3–4	0–0		7–11

=== Doubles ===
Current as far as the 2014 US Open (tennis).

Tournament	2010	2011	2012	2013	2014	W–L
Grand Slams
Australian Open						0–0
French Open	3R	1R				2–2
Wimbledon						0–0
US Open						0–0
Win–loss	2–1	0–1	0–0	0–0	0–0	2–2
