= Oberstaufen =

- Municipality
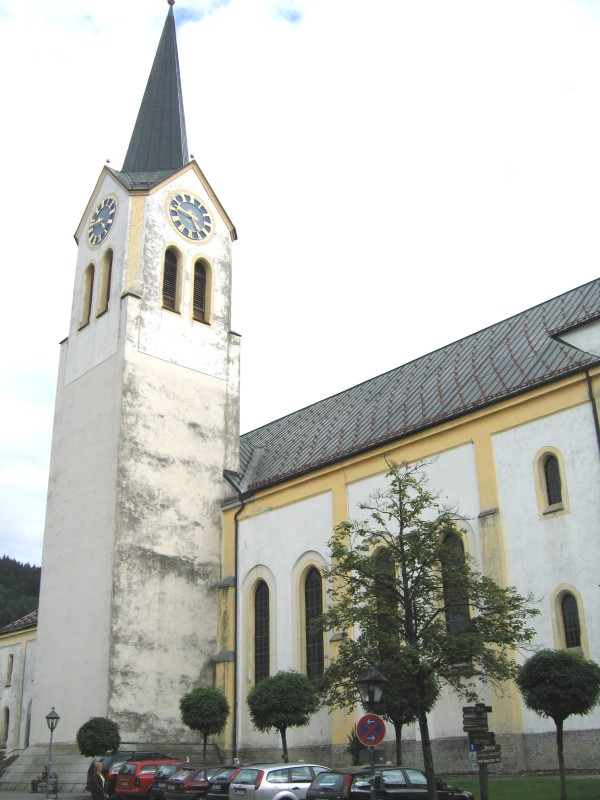
- Saint Peter and Paul Church

- Coat of arms

- Location of Oberstaufen within Oberallgäu district
- Interactive map of Oberstaufen
- Location within Germany Location within Bavaria
- Coordinates: 47°33′15″N 10°01′23″E
- Country: Germany
- State: Bavaria
- Admin. region: Schwaben
- District: Oberallgäu

Government
  - Mayor (2020–26): Martin Beckel

Area
  - Total: 125.84 km^{2} (48.59 sq mi)
- Elevation: 791 m (2,595 ft)

Population (2025-12-31)
  - Total: 7,794
  - Density: 61.94/km^{2} (160.4/sq mi)
- Time zone: UTC+01:00 (CET)
  - Summer (DST): UTC+02:00 (CEST)
- Postal codes: 87534
- Dialling codes: 08386
- Vehicle registration: OA
- Website: www.oberstaufen.info

Oberstaufen (Low Alemannic: Schtoufe) is a municipality in the district of Oberallgäu in Bavarian Swabia, Germany, situated on the B 308 road from Lindau to Immenstadt.

== History ==
It is first mentioned as Stoufun in AD 868. Historically in Swabia (Alemannia), it became part of Bavaria in 1805 with the Peace of Pressburg.

As a result of a marketing campaign by the Oberstaufen tourism industry, Oberstaufen became the first German town for which Google Street View was made available on November 2, 2010.
