= Oberstaufen Cup =

- 2014 Oberstaufen Cup

Defunct tennis tournament
- Event name: Oberstaufen Cup
- Location: Oberstaufen, Germany
- Venue: TC Blau-Weiß Oberstaufen
- Category: ATP Challenger Tour
- Surface: Clay (red)
- Draw: 32S/12Q/16D
- Prize money: €30,000+H
- Website: Website

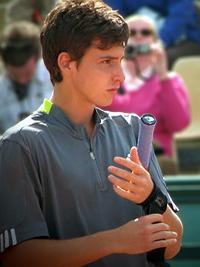
Latvian Ernests Gulbis reached both the singles and doubles finals in 2006, winning only in doubles with Zverev

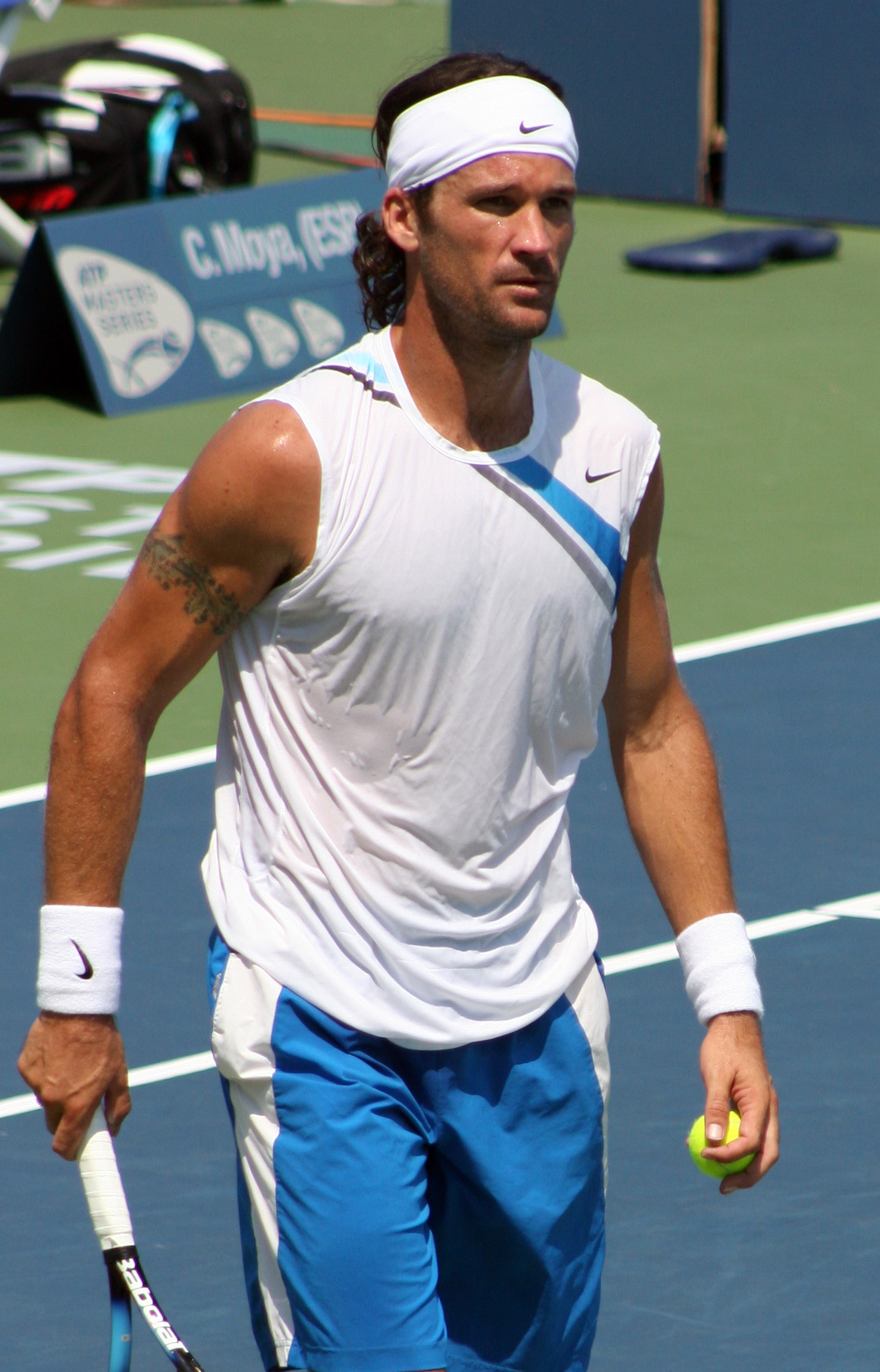
Eventual World No. 1 Carlos Moyá from Spain defeated Jiří Novák for the singles title in 1995

The Oberstaufen Cup was a professional tennis tournament played on outdoor red clay courts. It was part of the Association of Tennis Professionals (ATP) Challenger Tour. It was held annually in Oberstaufen, Germany, from 1992 until 2014.

== Past finals ==
=== Singles ===
Year	Champion	Runner-up	Score
2014	(Italy) Simone Bolelli	(Germany) Michael Berrer	6–4, 7–6^{(7–2)}
2013	(France) Guillaume Rufin	(Germany) Peter Gojowczyk	6–3, 6–4
2012	(Germany) Dominik Meffert	(Germany) Nils Langer	6–4, 6–3
2011	(Germany) Daniel Brands	(Germany) Andreas Beck	6–4, 7–6^{(7–3)}
2010	(Austria) Martin Fischer	(Germany) Cedrik-Marcel Stebe	6–3, 6–4
2009	(Czech Republic) Robin Vik	(Czech Republic) Jan Minář	6–1, 6–2
2008	(Poland) Łukasz Kubot	(Argentina) Juan Pablo Brzezicki	6–3, 6–4
2007	(Spain) Gabriel Trujillo Soler	(Germany) Philipp Petzschner	6–4, 6–4
2006	(Czech Republic) Michal Tabara	(Latvia) Ernests Gulbis	7–6(5), 6–3
2005	(Germany) Simon Greul	(Spain) Albert Portas	7–5, 6–2
2004	(Germany) Dieter Kindlmann	(Monaco) Jean-René Lisnard	6–7(6), 6–2, 6–4
2003	(Argentina) Martín Vassallo Argüello	(Italy) Andreas Seppi	6–1, 6–4
2002	(France) Nicolas Thomann	(Czech Republic) Tomáš Zíb	7–6(6), 6–4
2001	(Germany) Oliver Gross	(Austria) Oliver Marach	6–0, 6–1
2000	(Austria) Clemens Trimmel	(Czech Republic) Radomír Vašek	6–4, 6–1
1999	(Germany) Alexander Popp	(Brazil) Francisco Costa	7–6, 6–3
1998	(Austria) Wolfgang Schranz	(Netherlands) Rogier Wassen	6–4, 6–2
1997	(Italy) Davide Sanguinetti	(Italy) Andrea Gaudenzi	4–6, 7–6, 6–3
1996	(Germany) Jens Knippschild	(Chile) Gabriel Silberstein	6–3, 5–7, 7–6
1995	(Spain) Carlos Moyá	(Czech Republic) Jiří Novák	6–3, 6–4
1994	(Czech Republic) Bohdan Ulihrach	(Morocco) Hicham Arazi	6–2, 6–0
1993	(Bulgaria) Milen Velev	(Czech Republic) Sláva Doseděl	6–3, 7–6
1992	(Italy) Massimo Valeri	(Germany) Martin Sinner	6–3, 6–3

=== Doubles ===
Year	Champions	Runners-up	Score
2014	(Netherlands) Wesley Koolhof (Italy) Alessandro Motti	(Moldova) Radu Albot (Poland) Mateusz Kowalczyk	7–6^{(9–7)}, 6–3
2013	(Germany) Dominik Meffert (Austria) Philipp Oswald	(Netherlands) Stephan Fransen (New Zealand) Artem Sitak	6–1, 3–6, [14–12]
2012	(Romania) Andrei Dăescu (Romania) Florin Mergea	(Russia) Andrey Kuznetsov (New Zealand) Jose Rubin Statham	7–6^{(7–4)}, 7–6^{(7–1)}
2011	(Austria) Martin Fischer (Austria) Philipp Oswald	(Poland) Tomasz Bednarek (Poland) Mateusz Kowalczyk	7–6^{(7–1)}, 6–3
2010	(Germany) Frank Moser (Czech Republic) Lukáš Rosol	(Chile) Hans Podlipnik-Castillo (Austria) Max Raditschnigg	6–0, 7–5
2009	(Germany) Dieter Kindlmann (Germany) Marcel Zimmermann	(Germany) Michael Berrer (Austria) Philipp Oswald	6–4, 2–6, 10–4
2008	(Czech Republic) Dušan Karol (Czech Republic) Jaroslav Pospíšil	(Brazil) André Ghem (Netherlands) Boy Westerhof	6–7(2), 6–1, 10–6
2007	(Slovakia) Filip Polášek (Slovakia) Igor Zelenay	(Germany) Peter Gojowczyk (Germany) Marc Sieber	7–5, 7–5
2006	(Latvia) Ernests Gulbis (Germany) Mischa Zverev	(Romania) Teodor-Dacian Crăciun (Romania) Gabriel Moraru	6–1, 6–1
2005	(Austria) Oliver Marach (Switzerland) Jean-Claude Scherrer	(Austria) Werner Eschauer (Germany) Christopher Kas	7–5, 6–3
2004	(Russia) Vadim Davletshin (Russia) Alexander Kudryavtsev	(Germany) Valentino Pest (Germany) Alexander Waske	4–6, 6–3, 7–6(4)
2003	(Hungary) Kornél Bardóczky (Hungary) Gergely Kisgyörgy	(Argentina) Ignacio González King (Brazil) Ricardo Schlachter	4–6, 7–6(4), 6–2
2002	(Chile) Jaime Fillol Jr. (Brazil) Ricardo Schlachter	(Argentina) Patricio Arquez (Argentina) Sergio Roitman	6–2, 6–4
2001	(Slovakia) Karol Beck (Slovakia) Branislav Sekáč	(Austria) Thomas Strengberger (Austria) Clemens Trimmel	2–6, 6–1, 6–0
2000	(United States) Hugo Armando (Brazil) Alexandre Simoni	(Germany) Tomas Behrend (Germany) Karsten Braasch	6–4, 6–3
1999	(Netherlands) Edwin Kempes (Czech Republic) Petr Luxa	(Germany) Karsten Braasch (Germany) Jens Knippschild	7–5, 6–4
1998	(Portugal) Nuno Marques (Netherlands) Rogier Wassen	(Italy) Omar Camporese (Socialist Federal Republic of Yugoslavia) Dušan Vemić	7–6, 7–6
1997	(Spain) Juan-Ignacio Carrasco (Spain) Jordi Mas-Rodriguez	(Austria) Georg Blumauer (Italy) Andrea Gaudenzi	6–2, 7–6
1996	(Germany) Karsten Braasch (Germany) Jens Knippschild	(France) Maxime Huard (France) Guillaume Marx	6–2, 6–4
1995	(Czech Republic) Tomáš Krupa (Czech Republic) Jiří Novák	(Switzerland) Lorenzo Manta (Switzerland) Patrick Mohr	4–6, 6–4, 6–3
1994	(Australia) Joshua Eagle (South Africa) Kirk Haygarth	(Spain) Álex López Morón (Italy) Massimo Valeri	6–3, 6–2
1993	(Czech Republic) Sláva Doseděl (Czech Republic) Radomír Vašek	(Germany) Christian Geyer (Germany) Mathias Huning	6–2, 6–2
1992	(Australia) Johan Anderson (Sweden) Lars-Anders Wahlgren	(Belgium) Filip Dewulf (Belgium) Tom Vanhoudt	2–6, 7–6, 6–4
