= Marcel Zimmermann =

German tennis player

- Country (sports): Germany
- Residence: Munich, Germany
- Born: 20 January 1985 (age 40); Emmerich am Rhein, Germany
- Height: 1.83 m (6 ft 0 in)
- Plays: Right-handed (two-handed backhand)
- Prize money: $78,735

Singles
- Career record: 0–0
- Career titles: 0; 0 Challenger, 7 Futures
- Highest ranking: No. 299 (11 April 2011)

Doubles
- Career record: 0–0
- Career titles: 0; 1 Challenger, 11 Futures
- Highest ranking: No. 303 (7 June 2010)
- Last updated on: 8 May 2017.

Marcel Zimmermann (born 20 January 1985) is a retired German tennis player.

Zimmermann has a career high ATP singles ranking of 299 achieved on 11 April 2011. He also has a career high doubles ranking of 303 achieved on 7 June 2010. Zimmermann has won 1 ATP Challenger doubles title at the 2009 Oberstaufen Cup.

== Tour titles ==
Legend
Grand Slam (0)
ATP Masters Series (0)
ATP Tour (0)
Challengers (1)

=== Doubles ===
| Result | Date | Category | Tournament | Surface | Partner | Opponents | Score |
|---|---|---|---|---|---|---|---|
| Winner | July 2009 | Challenger | Oberstaufen, Germany | Clay | (Germany) Dieter Kindlmann | (Germany) Michael Berrer (Austria) Philipp Oswald | 6–4, 2–6, [10–4] |
