= Dieter Kindlmann =

German tennis player (born 1982)

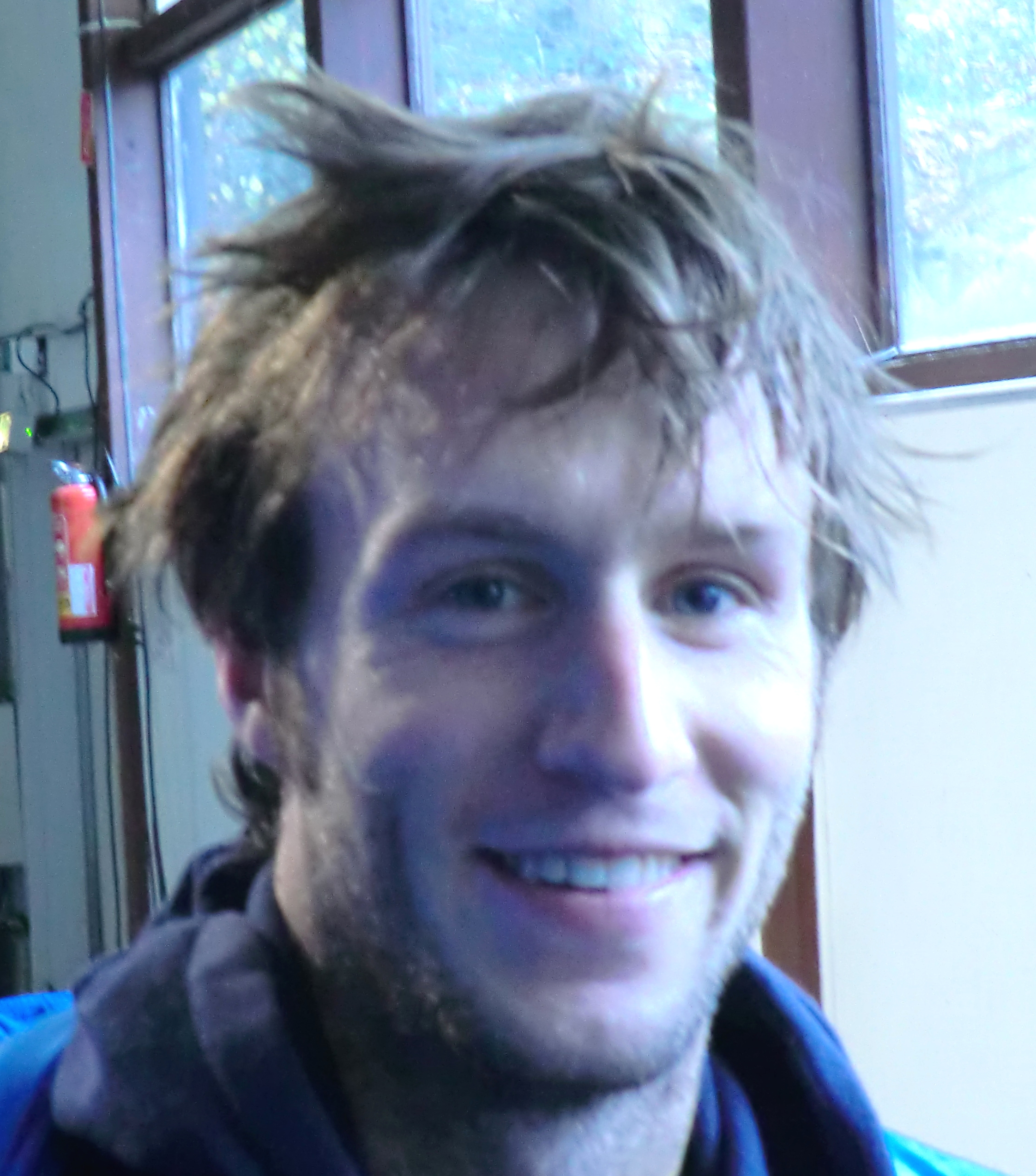
- Country (sports): Germany
- Residence: Blaichach, Germany
- Born: 3 June 1982 (age 43) Sonthofen, West Germany
- Height: 1.80 m (5 ft 11 in)
- Turned pro: 2001
- Retired: 2012 (last doubles match 2025)
- Plays: Right-handed (two-handed backhand)
- Prize money: US$381,798

Singles
- Career record: 1–11
- Career titles: 0
- Highest ranking: No. 130 (26 July 2004)

Grand Slam singles results
- Australian Open: 1R (2005, 2009, 2010)
- French Open: 2R (2006)
- Wimbledon: Q2 (2009)
- US Open: 1R (2009)

Doubles
- Career record: 0–0
- Career titles: 0
- Highest ranking: No. 317 (5 July 2010)
- Current ranking: No. 1,714 (29 December 2025)

Dieter Kindlmann (born 3 June 1982) is a German former professional tennis player. He reached his highest individual ranking on the ATP Tour on 26 July 2004, when he became World number 130. His best appearance at a Grand Slam came at the 2006 French Open, where he reached the main draw as a qualifier, losing in the second round.

After his retirement, he served as Maria Sharapova's hitting partner. Later, he joined the coaching teams of Anastasia Pavlyuchenkova, Laura Robson, and Madison Keys, helping the American reach her first Grand Slam final in 2017. Since July 2018, he has been a head coach, accompanying Elise Mertens. On 21 November 2019, 3-time majors champion Angelique Kerber announced that she has hired Kindlmann as her coach.

== Singles Titles ==
Legend (singles)
Grand Slam (0)
Tennis Masters Cup (0)
ATP Masters Series (0)
ATP Tour (0)
Challengers (4)
Futures (1)

No.	Date	Tournament	Surface	Opponent in the final	Score
1.	2002	Thessaloniki	Hard	(Greece) Konstantinos Economidis	W/O
2.	2003	Aschaffenburg	Clay	(Germany) Marcello Craca	6–3, 6–4
3.	2004	Oberstaufen	Clay	(France) Jean-René Lisnard	6–7, 6–2, 6–4
4.	2005	Wolfsburg	Carpet	(Germany) Tobias Summerer	7–5, 4–1, RET.
5.	2008	New Delhi-IV	Hard	(United Kingdom) Joshua Goodall	7–6, 6–3

== Grand Slam performance timeline ==
Key
W	F	SF	QF	#R	RR	Q#	DNQ	A	NH

(W) winner; (F) finalist; (SF) semifinalist; (QF) quarterfinalist; (#R) rounds 4, 3, 2, 1; (RR) round-robin stage; (Q#) qualification round; (DNQ) did not qualify; (A) absent; (NH) not held; (SR) strike rate (events won / competed); (W–L) win–loss record.

Tournament	2005	2006	2007	2008	2009	2010	Career SR	Career win–loss
Australian Open	1R	A	LQ	A	1R	1R	0 / 3	0–3
French Open	A	2R	LQ	A	LQ	1R	0 / 2	1–2
Wimbledon	A	A	A	A	LQ	-	0 / 0	0–0
US Open	A	A	A	A	1R	A	0 / 1	0–1
Grand Slam Win–loss	0–1	1–1	0–0	0–0	0–2	0–2	0 / 6	1–6
Year End Ranking	305	238	359	231	173	N/A	N/A	N/A
