= Marin Čilić career statistics =

Career finals
Discipline	Type	Won	Lost	Total
Singles	Grand Slam	1	2	3
Singles	ATP Finals	–	–	–
Singles	ATP 1000	1	–	1
Singles	ATP 500	2	4	6
Singles	ATP 250	17	9	26
Singles	Olympics	–	–	–
Singles	Total	21	15	36
Doubles	Grand Slam	–	–	–
Doubles	ATP Finals	–	–	–
Doubles	ATP 1000	–	–	–
Doubles	ATP 500	–	–	–
Doubles	ATP 250	–	1	1
Doubles	Olympics	–	1	1
Doubles	Total	–	2	2

This is a list of the main career statistics of Croatian professional tennis player Marin Čilić. To date, Čilić has won 21 ATP singles titles including one Grand Slam singles title at the 2014 US Open, one ATP Masters 1000 title at the 2016 Western & Southern Open and a record four titles at the PBZ Zagreb Indoors. Other highlights of Čilić's career thus far include finals at the 2017 Wimbledon Championships and 2018 Australian Open. Čilić achieved a career high singles ranking of world No. 3 on 29 January 2018.

== Career achievements ==
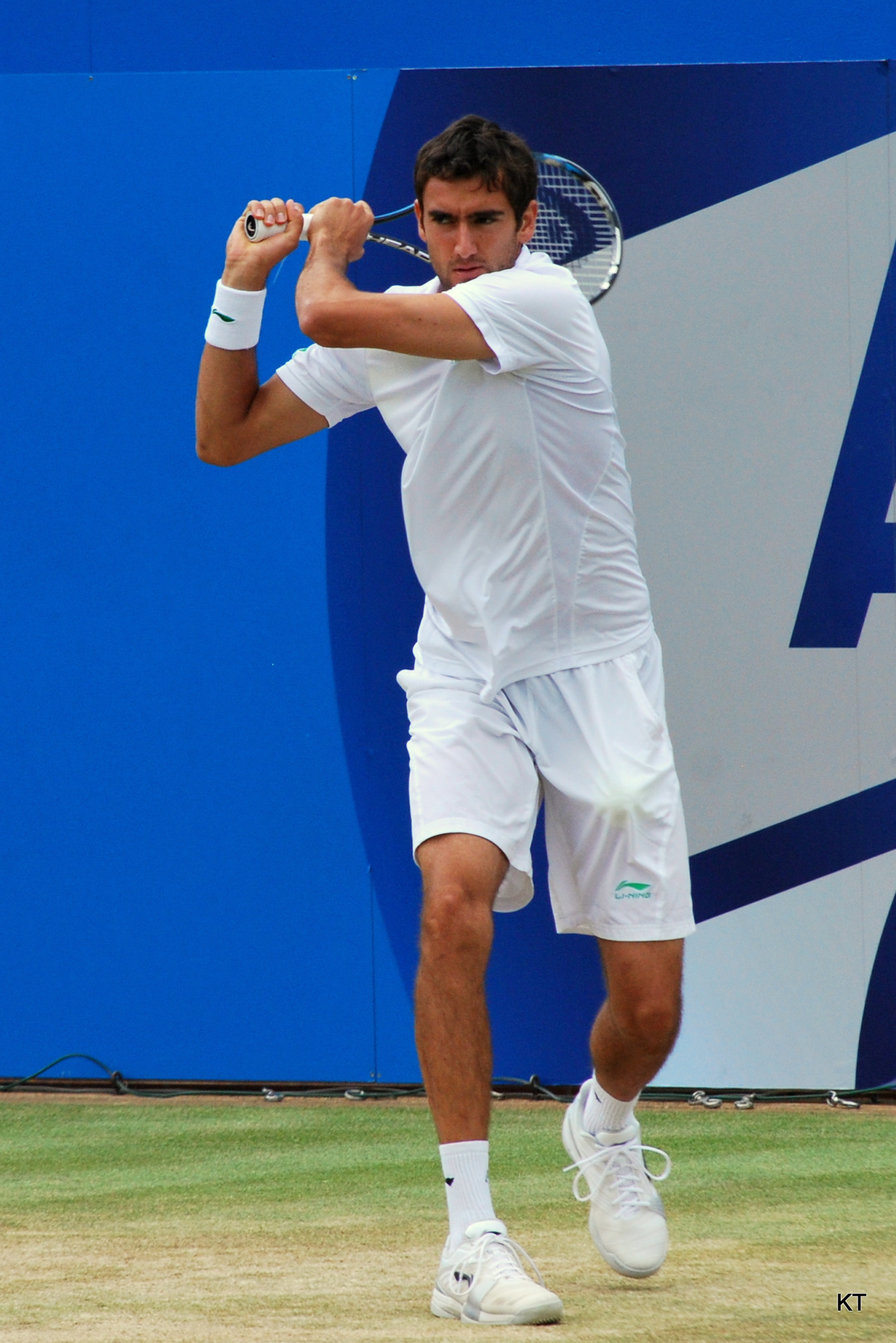
Čilić claimed his first career singles title on grass at the 2012 Queen's Club Championships.

In August 2008, Čilić reached his first career singles final at the Pilot Pen Tennis event in New Haven, where he defeated Mardy Fish in three sets to win his first ATP singles title. The following year, Čilić claimed the first of his four titles at the PBZ Zagreb Indoors with a straight sets victory over his compatriot Mario Ančić in the final before advancing to his first grand slam quarterfinal at the US Open after a straight sets win over then World No. 2 Andy Murray before losing to the eventual champion, Juan Martín del Potro in four sets after leading by a set and a break. However, Čilić avenged his defeat to Del Potro at the 2010 Australian Open, where he defeated the Argentine en route to his first grand slam semi-final where he lost to the eventual runner-up, Andy Murray despite winning the first set. By reaching this stage of the event, Čilić became the first Croatian to reach the Australian Open semi-finals and also entered the top ten of the ATP rankings for the first time in his career, thus becoming just the fourth player from his country to do so after his coach, Goran Ivanišević and his compatriots, Ivan Ljubičić and Mario Ančić.

Midway through 2012, Čilić claimed his first career singles titles on grass and clay respectively after a default over David Nalbandian in the final of the Queen's Club Championships and a straight sets victory over Marcel Granollers in the final of the ATP Studena Croatia Open before reaching his third grand slam quarterfinal at the US Open, where he lost to the eventual champion, Andy Murray after leading by a set and 5–1.

In July 2014, Čilić reached his first quarterfinal at the Wimbledon Championships, defeating 2010 runner-up Tomáš Berdych en route before losing in five sets to the top seed and eventual champion, Novak Djokovic. In September, Čilić recorded the third hundred singles win of his career by winning his first grand slam singles title at the US Open, defeating five-time champion, Roger Federer en route and fellow first time grand slam finalist, Kei Nishikori in the final. In doing so, he became the first Croatian player to win a major since his coach, Goran Ivanišević and the first player outside of the top ten to win the last grand slam of the year since Pete Sampras in 2002. Čilić also joined Juan Martín del Potro and Stanislas Wawrinka as the only players outside of the Big Four to have won a grand slam since 2005.

In 2016, Čilić won his first Masters 1000 title in Cincinnati, becoming only the second tennis player outside of the Big Four to win both a Major and a Masters title in the last decade, the other player being Stan Wawrinka. He followed this up with his first ATP 500 victory at the Swiss Indoors. At the 2016 Paris Masters, Čilić gained his first victory over world number one Novak Djokovic to reach the semi-finals, which both guaranteed his place in that year's ATP World Tour Finals and allowed Andy Murray – who Čilić beat for the first time in seven years in the Cincinnati final – to overtake Djokovic at the top of the rankings.

== Performance timeline ==
Key
W	F	SF	QF	#R	RR	Q#	P#	DNQ	A	Z#	PO	G	S	B	NMS	NTI	P	NH

(W) winner; (F) finalist; (SF) semifinalist; (QF) quarterfinalist; (#R) rounds 4, 3, 2, 1; (RR) round-robin stage; (Q#) qualification round; (P#) preliminary round; (DNQ) did not qualify; (A) absent; (Z#) Davis/Fed Cup Zonal Group (with number indication) or (PO) play-off; (G) gold, (S) silver or (B) bronze Olympic/Paralympic medal; (NMS) not a Masters tournament; (NTI) not a Tier I tournament; (P) postponed; (NH) not held; (SR) strike rate (events won / competed); (W–L) win–loss record.
To avoid confusion and double counting, these charts are updated at the conclusion of a tournament or when the player's participation has ended.

Current through the 2026 Rolex Shanghai Masters.

Tournament	2005	2006	2007	2008	2009	2010	2011	2012	2013	2014	2015	2016	2017	2018	2019	2020	2021	2022	2023	2024	2025	2026	SR	W–L	Win%
Grand Slam Tournaments
Australian Open	A	A	1R	4R	4R	SF	4R	A	3R	2R	A	3R	2R	F	4R	4R	1R	4R	A	1R	A	3R	0 / 16	37–16	70%
French Open	A	Q2	1R	2R	4R	4R	1R	3R	3R	3R	4R	1R	QF	QF	2R	1R	2R	SF	A	A	1R	1R	0 / 18	31–18	63%
Wimbledon	A	A	1R	4R	3R	1R	1R	4R	2R	QF	QF	QF	F	2R	2R	NH	3R	A	A	A	4R	1R	0 / 16	34–15	69%
US Open	A	Q1	Q1	3R	QF	2R	3R	QF	A	W	SF	3R	3R	QF	4R	3R	1R	4R	A	A	1R	A	1 / 15	41–14	75%
Win–loss	0–0	0–0	0–3	9–4	12–4	9–4	5–4	9–3	5–2	14–3	12–3	8–4	13–4	15–4	8–4	5–3	3–4	11–3	0–0	0–1	3–3	2–3	1 / 65	143–63	69%
Year-end championships
ATP Finals	did not qualify									RR	DNQ	RR	RR	RR	did not qualify								0 / 4	2–10	17%
National representation
Summer Olympics (Note: 2020 Summer Olympics is postponed to 2021 due to COVID-19 pandemic.)	not held			2R	not held			2R	not held			3R	not held				2R	NH		A	NH		0 / 4	5–4	56%
Davis Cup	A	QF	1R	Z1	SF	QF	1R	QF	1R	PO	A	F	1R	W	A	NH	F	SF	A	A	2R		1 / 13	33–18	65%
ATP 1000 tournaments
Indian Wells Open	A	A	A	2R	3R	2R	3R	2R	3R	4R	2R	QF	2R	3R	3R	NH	A	2R	A	A	A	1R	0 / 14	12–14	46%
Miami Open	A	A	A	2R	3R	4R	2R	3R	QF	2R	A	3R	2R	4R	2R	NH	4R	3R	A	A	A	3R	0 / 14	17–14	55%
Monte-Carlo Masters	A	Q1	A	1R	2R	3R	3R	2R	3R	2R	QF	A	QF	QF	2R	NH	1R	2R	A	A	A	2R	0 / 14	15–14	52%
Madrid Open	A	A	A	3R	2R	3R	2R	3R	1R	3R	2R	A	2R	A	QF	NH	A	2R	A	A	1R	2R	0 / 13	15–11	58%
Hamburg Masters	A	A	A	1R	ATP Tour 500																		0 / 1	0–1	0%
Italian Open	A	A	A	1R	3R	2R	QF	1R	2R	2R	1R	A	QF	SF	2R	3R	2R	3R	A	A	A	2R	0 / 15	19–15	56%
Canadian Open	A	A	A	QF	1R	1R	3R	3R	A	3R	2R	2R	A	QF	3R	NH	2R	3R	A	A	A	2R	0 / 13	16–13	55%
Cincinnati Open	A	A	Q1	1R	2R	1R	1R	QF	A	3R	3R	W	A	SF	1R	1R	2R	3R	A	A	A	1R	1 / 14	19–13	59%
Shanghai Masters	not held				1R	1R	1R	QF	A	1R	3R	2R	SF	2R	1R	not held			A	1R	2R	1R	0 / 13	9–13	41%
Paris Masters	A	A	A	3R	QF	3R	1R	2R	2R	A	2R	SF	QF	QF	2R	3R	2R	1R	A	1R	A		0 / 15	16–15	52%
Win–loss	0–0	0–0	0–0	9–9	9–9	5–9	9–9	11–9	8–6	10–8	6–8	13–5	9–7	14–8	8–8	3–3	7–6	9–8	0–0	0–2	1–2	6–7	1 / 126	137–123	53%
Career statistics
	2005	2006	2007	2008	2009	2010	2011	2012	2013	2014	2015	2016	2017	2018	2019	2020	2021	2022	2023	2024	2025	2026	Career		
Tournaments	1	9	12	25	22	23	24	20	14	23	20	22	21	19	20	11	21	20	2	9	11	15	364		
Titles	0	0	0	1	2	2	1	2	1	4	1	2	1	1	0	0	2	0	0	1	0	0	Career total: 21		
Finals	0	0	0	1	4	3	4	3	2	5	1	4	3	2	0	0	3	1	0	1	0	0	Career total: 37		
Overall win–loss	0–1	5–11	14–13	37–25	48–21	40–22	44–22	39–19	26–12	54–21	35–19	49–24	45–22	44–20	22–19	14–12	33–23	32–21	1–1	6–9	8–13	14–16	21 / 364	610–366	63%
Win %	0%	31%	52%	60%	70%	65%	67%	67%	68%	72%	65%	67%	67%	69%	54%	54%	59%	60%	50%	40%	38%	47%	63%		
Year-end ranking	587	170	71	23	14	14	21	15	37	9	13	6	6	7	39	42	30	17	676	184	73	101	$33,505,570		

* Čilić withdrew before the second round match at the 2013 Wimbledon.

== Grand Slam tournaments ==
=== Singles: 3 (1 title, 2 runner-ups) ===
Result	Year	Championship	Surface	Opponent	Score
Win	2014	US Open	Hard	(Japan) Kei Nishikori	6–3, 6–3, 6–3
Loss	2017	Wimbledon	Grass	(Switzerland) Roger Federer	3–6, 1–6, 4–6
Loss	2018	Australian Open	Hard	(Switzerland) Roger Federer	2–6, 7–6^{(7–5)}, 3–6, 6–3, 1–6

== Other significant finals ==
=== Summer Olympics ===
==== Doubles: 1 (silver medal) ====
Result	Year	Tournament	Surface	Partner	Opponents	Score
Silver	2021	Tokyo Olympics	Hard	(Croatia) Ivan Dodig	(Croatia) Nikola Mektić (Croatia) Mate Pavić	4–6, 6–3, [6–10]

=== ATP 1000 tournaments ===
==== Singles: 1 (title) ====
Result	Year	Tournament	Surface	Opponent	Score
Win	2016	Cincinnati Open	Hard	(United Kingdom) Andy Murray	6–4, 7–5

== ATP Tour finals ==
=== Singles: 37 (21 titles, 16 runner-ups) ===
Legend Grand Slam (1–2) ATP Finals (0–0) ATP 1000 (1–0) ATP 500 (2–4) ATP 250 (International) (17–10)	Finals by surface Hard (16–9) Clay (2–4) Grass (3–3)	Finals by setting Outdoor (12–10) Indoor (9–6)

Result	W–L	Date	Tournament	Tier	Surface	Opponent	Score
Win	1–0	Aug 2008	Connecticut Open, US	International	Hard	(United States) Mardy Fish	6–4, 4–6, 6–2
Win	2–0	Jan 2009	Chennai Open, India	ATP 250	Hard	(India) Somdev Devvarman	6–4, 7–6^{(7–3)}
Win	3–0	Feb 2009	Zagreb Indoors, Croatia	ATP 250	Hard (i)	(Croatia) Mario Ančić	6–3, 6–4
Loss	3–1	Oct 2009	China Open, China	ATP 500	Hard	(Serbia) Novak Djokovic	2–6, 6–7^{(4–7)}
Loss	3–2	Nov 2009	Vienna Open, Austria	ATP 250	Hard (i)	(Austria) Jürgen Melzer	4–6, 3–6
Win	4–2	Jan 2010	Chennai Open, India (2)	ATP 250	Hard	(Switzerland) Stan Wawrinka	7–6^{(7–2)}, 7–6^{(7–3)}
Win	5–2	Feb 2010	Zagreb Indoors, Croatia (2)	ATP 250	Hard (i)	(Germany) Michael Berrer	6–4, 6–7^{(5–7)}, 6–3
Loss	5–3	May 2010	Bavarian Championships, Germany	ATP 250	Clay	(Russia) Mikhail Youzhny	3–6, 6–4, 4–6
Loss	5–4	Feb 2011	Open 13, France	ATP 250	Hard (i)	(Sweden) Robin Söderling	7–6^{(10–8)}, 3–6, 3–6
Loss	5–5	Jul 2011	Croatia Open, Croatia	ATP 250	Clay	(Ukraine) Alexandr Dolgopolov	4–6, 6–3, 3–6
Loss	5–6	Oct 2011	China Open, China	ATP 500	Hard	(Czech Republic) Tomáš Berdych	6–3, 4–6, 1–6
Win	6–6	Oct 2011	St. Petersburg Open, Russia	ATP 250	Hard (i)	(Serbia) Janko Tipsarević	6–3, 3–6, 6–2
Loss	6–7	May 2012	Bavarian Championships, Germany	ATP 250	Clay	(Germany) Philipp Kohlschreiber	6–7^{(8–10)}, 3–6
Win	7–7	Jun 2012	Queen's Club Championships, UK	ATP 250	Grass	(Argentina) David Nalbandian	6–7^{(3–7)}, 4–3 default
Win	8–7	Jul 2012	Croatia Open, Croatia	ATP 250	Clay	(Spain) Marcel Granollers	6–4, 6–2
Win	9–7	Feb 2013	Zagreb Indoors, Croatia (3)	ATP 250	Hard (i)	(Austria) Jürgen Melzer	6–3, 6–1
Loss	9–8	Jun 2013	Queen's Club Championships, UK	ATP 250	Grass	(United Kingdom) Andy Murray	7–5, 5–7, 3–6
Win	10–8	Feb 2014	Zagreb Indoors, Croatia (4)	ATP 250	Hard (i)	(Germany) Tommy Haas	6–3, 6–4
Loss	10–9	Feb 2014	Rotterdam Open, Netherlands	ATP 500	Hard (i)	(Czech Republic) Tomáš Berdych	4–6, 2–6
Win	11–9	Feb 2014	Delray Beach Open, US	ATP 250	Hard	(South Africa) Kevin Anderson	7–6^{(8–6)}, 6–7^{(7–9)}, 6–4
Win	12–9	Sep 2014	US Open, US	Grand Slam	Hard	(Japan) Kei Nishikori	6–3, 6–3, 6–3
Win	13–9	Oct 2014	Kremlin Cup, Russia	ATP 250	Hard (i)	(Spain) Roberto Bautista Agut	6–4, 6–4
Win	14–9	Oct 2015	Kremlin Cup, Russia (2)	ATP 250	Hard (i)	(Spain) Roberto Bautista Agut	6–4, 6–4
Loss	14–10	Feb 2016	Open 13, France	ATP 250	Hard (i)	(Australia) Nick Kyrgios	2–6, 6–7^{(3–7)}
Loss	14–11	May 2016	Geneva Open, Switzerland	ATP 250	Clay	(Switzerland) Stan Wawrinka	4–6, 6–7^{(11–13)}
Win	15–11	Aug 2016	Cincinnati Open, US	ATP 1000	Hard	(United Kingdom) Andy Murray	6–4, 7–5
Win	16–11	Oct 2016	Swiss Indoors, Switzerland	ATP 500	Hard (i)	(Japan) Kei Nishikori	6–1, 7–6^{(7–5)}
Win	17–11	May 2017	Istanbul Open, Turkey	ATP 250	Clay	(Canada) Milos Raonic	7–6^{(7–3)}, 6–3
Loss	17–12	Jun 2017	Queen's Club Championships, UK	ATP 500	Grass	(Spain) Feliciano López	6–4, 6–7^{(2–7)}, 6–7^{(8–10)}
Loss	17–13	Jul 2017	Wimbledon Championships, UK	Grand Slam	Grass	(Switzerland) Roger Federer	3–6, 1–6, 4–6
Loss	17–14	Jan 2018	Australian Open, Australia	Grand Slam	Hard	(Switzerland) Roger Federer	2–6, 7–6^{(7–5)}, 3–6, 6–3, 1–6
Win	18–14	Jun 2018	Queen's Club Championships, UK (2)	ATP 500	Grass	(Serbia) Novak Djokovic	5–7, 7–6^{(7–4)}, 6–3
Win	19–14	Jun 2021	Stuttgart Open, Germany	ATP 250	Grass	(Canada) Félix Auger-Aliassime	7–6^{(7–2)}, 6–3
Loss	19–15	Oct 2021	Kremlin Cup, Russia	ATP 250	Hard (i)	(Russia) Aslan Karatsev	2–6, 4–6
Win	20–15	Oct 2021	St. Petersburg Open, Russia (2)	ATP 250	Hard (i)	(United States) Taylor Fritz	7–6^{(7–3)}, 4–6, 6–4
Loss	20–16	Sep 2022	Tel Aviv Open, Israel	ATP 250	Hard (i)	(Serbia) Novak Djokovic	3–6, 4–6
Win	21–16	Sep 2024	Hangzhou Open, China	ATP 250	Hard	(China) Zhang Zhizhen	7–6^{(7–5)}, 7–6^{(7–5)}

=== Doubles: 2 (2 runner-ups) ===
Legend Grand Slam (0–0) Olympics (0–1) ATP Finals (0–0) ATP 1000 (0–0) ATP 500 (0–0) ATP 250 (0–1)	Finals by surface Hard (0–1) Clay (0–1) Grass (0–0)	Finals by setting Outdoor (0–2) Indoor (0–0)

Result	W–L	Date	Tournament	Tier	Surface	Partner	Opponents	Score
Loss	0–1	Jul 2011	Croatia Open, Croatia	ATP 250	Clay	(Croatia) Lovro Zovko	(Italy) Simone Bolelli (Italy) Fabio Fognini	3–6, 7–5, [7–10]
Loss	0–2	Jul 2021	Summer Olympics, Japan	Olympics	Hard	(Croatia) Ivan Dodig	(Croatia) Nikola Mektić (Croatia) Mate Pavić	4–6, 6–3, [6–10]

== ATP Challenger and ITF Futures finals ==
=== Singles: 8 (6 titles, 2 runner-ups) ===
Legend ATP Challenger Tour (4–1) ITF Futures Tour (2–1)	Finals by surface Hard (1–1) Clay (4–1) Grass (1–0)

Result	W–L	Date	Tournament	Tier	Surface	Opponent	Score
Win	1–0	Apr 2007	Casablanca, Morocco	Challenger	Clay	(Italy) Simone Bolelli	4–6, 6–3, 6–4
Win	2–0	May 2007	Rijeka, Croatia	Challenger	Clay	(Slovakia) Lukáš Lacko	7–5, 6–2
Win	3–0	Mar 2025	Girona, Spain	Challenger	Clay	(Denmark) Elmer Møller	6–3, 6–4
Loss	3–1	Apr 2025	Madrid, Spain	Challenger	Clay	(Poland) Kamil Majchrzak	3–6, 6–4, 4–6
Win	4–1	Jun 2025	Nottingham, UK	Challenger	Grass	(Japan) Shintaro Mochizuki	6–2, 6–3
Win	1–0	Aug 2005	Croatia F3, Vinkovci	Futures	Clay	(Slovakia) Lukáš Lacko	6–3, 6–1
Win	2–0	Feb 2006	Croatia F1, Zagreb	Futures	Hard	(Germany) Dieter Kindlmann	6–4, 6–2
Loss	2–1	Feb 2006	Croatia F2, Zagreb	Futures	Hard	(Germany) Mischa Zverev	6–7^{(5–7)}, 6–3, 6–7^{(7–9)}

=== Doubles: 3 (1 title, 2 runner-ups) ===
Legend ATP Challenger Tour (0–0) ITF Futures Tour (1–2)	Finals by surface Hard (0–1) Clay (1–1) Grass (0–0)

Result	W–L	Date	Tournament	Tier	Surface	Partner	Opponents	Score
Loss	0–1	Aug 2004	Croatia F5, Zagreb	Futures	Clay	(Croatia) Ante Nakić-Alfirević	(Croatia) Luka Kukulić (Croatia) Marko Vukelić	3–6, 3–6
Loss	0–2	Feb 2005	Croatia F2, Zagreb	Futures	Hard	(Croatia) Ante Nakić-Alfirević	(Slovenia) Rok Jarc (Slovenia) Boštjan Ošabnik	6–7^{(3–7)}, 2–6
Win	1–2	Aug 2005	Croatia F3, Vinkovci	Futures	Clay	(Croatia) Ivan Dodig	(Czech Republic) Daniel Lustig (Czech Republic) Karel Tříska	3–6, 6–4, 6–3

== Team competition finals ==
=== Davis Cup: 3 (1 title, 2 runner-ups) ===
Result	No.	Date	Tournament	Surface	Partner(s)	Opponents	Score
Loss	1.	25–27 November 2016	Davis Cup, Zagreb, Croatia	Hard (i)	(Croatia) Ivo Karlović (Croatia) Ivan Dodig (Croatia) Franko Škugor	(Argentina) Juan Martín del Potro (Argentina) Federico Delbonis (Argentina) Leonardo Mayer (Argentina) Guido Pella	2–3
Win	1.	23–25 November 2018	Davis Cup, Lille, France	Clay (i)	(Croatia) Borna Ćorić (Croatia) Ivan Dodig (Croatia) Franko Škugor	(France) Jo-Wilfried Tsonga (France) Lucas Pouille (France) Jérémy Chardy (France) Nicolas Mahut (France) Pierre-Hugues Herbert	3–1
Loss	2.	5 December 2021	Davis Cup, Madrid, Spain	Hard (i)	(Croatia) Borna Gojo (Croatia) Nikola Mektić (Croatia) Mate Pavić (Croatia) Nino Serdarušić	(Russia) Daniil Medvedev (Russia) Andrey Rublev (Russia) Aslan Karatsev (Russia) Karen Khachanov (Russia) Evgeny Donskoy	0–2

== Best Grand Slam results details ==
	Australian Open	
2018 Australian Open (6th Seed)
Round	Opponent	Score
1R	(Canada) Vasek Pospisil (Q)	6–2, 6–2, 4–6, 7–6^{(7–5)}
2R	(Portugal) João Sousa	6–1, 7–5, 6–2
3R	(United States) Ryan Harrison	7–6^{(7–4)}, 6–3, 7–6^{(7–4)}
4R	(Spain) Pablo Carreño Busta (10)	6–7^{(2–7)}, 6–3, 7–6^{(7–0)}, 7–6^{(7–3)}
QF	(Spain) Rafael Nadal (1)	3–6, 6–3, 6–7^{(5–7)}, 6–2, 2–0 Ret.
SF	(United Kingdom) Kyle Edmund	6–2, 7–6^{(7–0)}, 6–2
F	(Switzerland) Roger Federer (2)	2–6, 7–6^{(7–5)}, 3–6, 6–3, 1–6

	French Open	
2022 French Open (20th Seed)
Round	Opponent	Score
1R	(Hungary) Attila Balázs (PR)	6–0, 6–1, 6–2
2R	(Hungary) Márton Fucsovics	4–6, 6–4, 6–2, 6–3
3R	(France) Gilles Simon (WC)	6–0, 6–3, 6–2
4R	(Russia) Daniil Medvedev (2)	6–2, 6–3, 6–2
QF	(Russia) Andrey Rublev (7)	5–7, 6–3, 6–4, 3–6, 7–6^{(10–2)}
SF	(Norway) Casper Ruud (8)	6–3, 4–6, 2–6, 2–6

	Wimbledon Championships	
2017 Wimbledon (7th seed)
Round	Opponent	Score
1R	(Germany) Philipp Kohlschreiber (Q)	6–4, 6–2, 6–3
2R	(Germany) Florian Mayer	7–6^{(7–2)}, 6–4 7–5
3R	(United States) Steve Johnson (26)	6–4, 7–6^{(7–3)}, 6–4
4R	(Spain) Roberto Bautista Agut (18)	6–2, 6–2, 6–2
QF	(Luxembourg) Gilles Müller (16)	3–6, 7–6^{(8–6)}, 7–5, 5–7, 6–1
SF	(United States) Sam Querrey (24)	6–7^{(6–8)}, 6–4, 7–6^{(7–3)}, 7–5
F	(Switzerland) Roger Federer (3)	3–6, 1–6, 4–6

	US Open	
2014 US Open (14th Seed)
Round	Opponent	Score
1R	(Cyprus) Marcos Baghdatis	6–3, 3–1 Ret.
2R	(Ukraine) Illya Marchenko (Q)	7–6^{(7–2)}, 6–2, 6–4
3R	(South Africa) Kevin Anderson (18)	6–3, 3–6, 6–3, 6–4
4R	(France) Gilles Simon (26)	5–7, 7–6^{(7–3)}, 6–4, 3–6, 6–3
QF	(Czech Republic) Tomáš Berdych (6)	6–2, 6–4, 7–6^{(7–4)}
SF	(Switzerland) Roger Federer (2)	6–3, 6–4, 6–4
W	(Japan) Kei Nishikori (10)	6–3, 6–3, 6–3

== Wins against top-10 players ==
- Čilić has a 38–101 (27.34%) record against players who were, at the time the match was played, ranked in the top 10.

Season	2005	2006	2007	2008	2009	2010	2011	2012	2013	2014	2015	2016	2017	2018	2019	2020	2021	2022	2023	2024	2025	Total
Wins	0	0	2	2	4	2	1	1	2	5	0	7	2	4	0	1	0	3	0	0	2	38

#	Player	Rank	Event	Surface	Rd	Score	MCR
2007
1.	(Russia) Nikolay Davydenko	4	Beijing, China	Hard	2R	6–3, 6–4	117
2.	(Russia) Nikolay Davydenko	4	St. Petersburg, Russia	Hard (i)	2R	1–6, 7–5, 6–1	102
2008
3.	(Chile) Fernando González	7	Australian Open, Melbourne, Australia	Hard	3R	6–2, 6–7^{(4–7)}, 6–3, 6–1	57
4.	(United States) Andy Roddick	6	Toronto, Canada	Hard	3R	6–4, 4–6, 6–4	42
2009
5.	(United Kingdom) Andy Murray	2	US Open, New York, United States	Hard	4R	7–5, 6–2, 6–2	17
6.	(Russia) Nikolay Davydenko	8	Beijing, China	Hard	QF	6–4, 6–4	15
7.	(Spain) Rafael Nadal	2	Beijing, China	Hard	SF	6–1, 6–3	15
8.	(Spain) Fernando Verdasco	8	Paris, France	Hard (i)	3R	3–6, 6–3, 6–4	13
2010
9.	(Argentina) Juan Martín del Potro	5	Australian Open, Melbourne, Australia	Hard	4R	5–7, 6–4, 7–5, 5–7, 6–3	14
10.	(United States) Andy Roddick	7	Australian Open, Melbourne, Australia	Hard	QF	7–6^{(7–4)}, 6–3, 3–6, 2–6, 6–3	14
2011
11.	(Czech Republic) Tomáš Berdych	7	Marseille, France	Hard (i)	QF	6–3, 6–4	28
2012
12.	(United States) John Isner	10	Madrid, Spain	Clay	2R	7–6^{(7–4)}, 7–6^{(7–3)}	24
2013
13.	(France) Jo-Wilfried Tsonga	8	Miami, United States	Hard	4R	7–5, 7–6^{(7–4)}	11
14.	(Czech Republic) Tomáš Berdych	6	London, England	Grass	QF	7–5, 7–6^{(7–4)}	11
2014
15.	(France) Jo-Wilfried Tsonga	10	Rotterdam, The Netherlands	Hard (i)	2R	6–4, 6–4	37
16.	(United Kingdom) Andy Murray	6	Rotterdam, The Netherlands	Hard (i)	QF	6–3, 6–4	37
17.	(Czech Republic) Tomáš Berdych	6	Wimbledon, London, England	Grass	3R	7–6^{(7–5)}, 7–5, 7–6^{(8–6)}	29
18.	(Czech Republic) Tomáš Berdych	7	US Open, New York, United States	Hard	QF	6–2, 6–4, 7–6^{(7–4)}	16
19.	(Switzerland) Roger Federer	3	US Open, New York, United States	Hard	SF	6–3, 6–4, 6–4	16
2016
20.	(France) Richard Gasquet	10	Indian Wells, United States	Hard	4R	7–5, 5–7, 6–2	12
21.	(Japan) Kei Nishikori	6	Wimbledon, London, England	Grass	4R	6–1, 5–1, ret.	13
22.	(Czech Republic) Tomáš Berdych	8	Cincinnati, United States	Hard	3R	6–3, 4–6, 6–4	14
23.	(United Kingdom) Andy Murray	2	Cincinnati, United States	Hard	F	6–4, 7–5	14
24.	(Japan) Kei Nishikori	5	Swiss Indoors, Basel, Switzerland	Hard (i)	F	6–1, 7–6^{(7–5)}	11
25.	(Serbia) Novak Djokovic	1	Paris, France	Hard (i)	QF	6–4, 7–6^{(7–2)}	12
26.	(Japan) Kei Nishikori	5	ATP World Tour Finals, London, UK	Hard (i)	RR	3–6, 6–2, 6–3	7
2017
27.	(Canada) Milos Raonic	6	Istanbul, Turkey	Clay	F	7–6^{(7–3)}, 6–3	8
28.	(Belgium) David Goffin	10	Rome, Italy	Clay	3R	6–3, 6–4	8
2018
29.	(Spain) Rafael Nadal	1	Australian Open, Melbourne, Australia	Hard	QF	3–6, 6–3, 6–7^{(5–7)}, 6–2, 2–0 ret.	6
30.	(Belgium) David Goffin	10	US Open, New York, United States	Hard	4R	7–6^{(8–6)}, 6–2, 6–4	7
31.	(Bulgaria) Grigor Dimitrov	10	Paris, France	Hard	3R	7–6^{(7–5)}, 6–4	7
32.	(United States) John Isner	10	ATP World Tour Finals, London, UK	Hard (i)	RR	6–7^{(2–7)}, 6–3, 6–4	7
2020
33.	(Spain) Roberto Bautista Agut	9	Australian Open, Melbourne, Australia	Hard	3R	6–7^{(3–7)}, 6–4, 6–0, 5–7, 6–3	39
2022
34.	(Russia) Andrey Rublev	5	Australian Open, Melbourne, Australia	Hard	3R	7–5, 7–6^{(7–3)}, 3–6, 6–3	27
35.	Daniil Medvedev	2	French Open, Paris, France	Clay	4R	6–2, 6–3, 6–2	23
36.	Andrey Rublev	7	French Open, Paris, France	Clay	QF	5–7, 6–3, 6–4, 3–6, 7–6^{(10–2)}	23
2025
37.	(Australia) Alex de Minaur	8	Dubai, United Arab Emirates	Hard	1R	6–2, 3–6, 6–3	192
38.	(United Kingdom) Jack Draper	4	Wimbledon, London, England	Grass	2R	6–4, 6–3, 1–6, 6–4	83

*As of 24 October 2025

== ATP Tour career earnings ==
Year	Majors	ATP wins	Total wins	Earnings	Money list rank
2004	0	0	0	$645	
2005	0	0	0	$9,131	
2006	0	0	0	$87,600	
2007	0	0	0	$215,750	112
2008	0	1	1	$677,846	38
2009	0	2	2	$1,210,376	15
2010	0	2	2	$1,151,955	17
2011	0	1	1	$1,139,799	16
2012	0	2	2	$1,186,306	16
2013	0	1	1	$680,052	50
2014	1	3	4	$4,957,288	5
2015	0	1	1	$2,063,576	10
2016	0	2	2	$3,475,205	6
2017	0	1	1	$4,063,739	14
2018	0	1	1	$5,187,148	7
2019	0	0	0	$1,359,592	37
2020	0	0	0	$820,529	28
2021	0	2	2	$923,606	43
2022	0	0	0	$1,971,089	23
2023	0	0	0	$26,138	630
2024	0	1	1	$361,759	170
2025	0	0	0	$875,928	99
2026	0	0	0	$390,634	33
Career	1	20	21	$32,963,248	12

* Statistics correct as of 2 March 2026.
