= 2011 ATP Studena Croatia Open – Singles Qualifying =

This article displays the qualifying draw of the 2011 ATP Studena Croatia Open.

== Players ==
=== Seeds ===
1. (Italy) Simone Bolelli (second round)
2. (Germany) Dustin Brown (first round)
3. (Spain) Rubén Ramírez Hidalgo (qualified)
4. (Italy) Simone Vagnozzi (qualified)
5. (Italy) Gianluca Naso (qualified)
6. (Serbia) Dušan Lajović (qualified)
7. (Slovenia) Aljaž Bedene (qualifying competition)
8. (Italy) Thomas Fabbiano (qualifying competition)

=== Qualifiers ===
1. (Italy) Gianluca Naso
2. (Serbia) Dušan Lajović
3. (Spain) Rubén Ramírez Hidalgo
4. (Italy) Simone Vagnozzi

== Qualifying draw ==
=== First qualifier ===
First round
1	(Italy) Simone Bolelli	6	6
WC	(Spain) Agustín González	1	2
(Croatia) Dino Marcan	6	6
(Russia) Alexander Zhurbin	1	4
(Bosnia and Herzegovina) Aldin Šetkić	7	6
WC	(Croatia) Filip Veger	5	1
(Bosnia and Herzegovina) Tomislav Brkić	2	4
5	(Italy) Gianluca Naso	6	6

Second round
1	(Italy) Simone Bolelli	6	3	6^{1}
(Croatia) Dino Marcan	4	6	7^{7}
(Bosnia and Herzegovina) Aldin Šetkić	3	1
5	(Italy) Gianluca Naso	6	6

Qualifying competition
(Croatia) Dino Marcan	4	5
5	(Italy) Gianluca Naso	6	7

=== Second qualifier ===
First round
2	(Germany) Dustin Brown	6^{5}	4
(Mexico) Santiago González	7^{7}	6
(Austria) Max Raditschnigg	6^{0}	6	6^{5}
(Austria) Marc Rath	7^{7}	1	7^{7}
(Greece) Theodoros Angelinos	6^{4}	2
(Croatia) Toni Androić	7^{7}	6
(Austria) Bjorn Propst	2	2
6	(Serbia) Dušan Lajović	6	6

Second round
(Mexico) Santiago González	6	5	1
(Austria) Marc Rath	2	7	6
(Croatia) Toni Androić	3	7^{7}	5
6	(Serbia) Dušan Lajović	6	6^{3}	7

Qualifying competition
(Austria) Marc Rath	2	5
6	(Serbia) Dušan Lajović	6	7

=== Third qualifier ===
First round
3	(Spain) Rubén Ramírez Hidalgo	6	6
WC	(Croatia) Franko Miočić	1	3
(Italy) Viktor Galović	4	0
(Croatia) Marin Franjičević	6	6
(Croatia) Joško Topić	6^{8}	6	6^{2}
(Austria) Christoph Lessiak	7^{10}	4	7^{7}
(Croatia) Marin Draganja	2	3
7	(Slovenia) Aljaž Bedene	6	6

Second round
3	(Spain) Rubén Ramírez Hidalgo	6	6
(Croatia) Marin Franjičević	2	4
(Austria) Christoph Lessiak	1	4
7	(Slovenia) Aljaž Bedene	6	6

Qualifying competition
3	(Spain) Rubén Ramírez Hidalgo	6	7^{7}
7	(Slovenia) Aljaž Bedene	4	6^{1}

=== Fourth qualifier ===
First round
4	(Italy) Simone Vagnozzi	6	6
(Bosnia and Herzegovina) Jasmin Ademović	4	2
WC	(Croatia) Marcel Ružić	2	3
(Slovenia) Mike Urbanija	6	6
(Croatia) Borut Puc	6	7^{7}
(Slovenia) Andraž Bedene	3	2
(Serbia) Saša Stojisavljević	4	7^{7}	4
8	(Italy) Thomas Fabbiano	6	6^{2}	6

Second round
4	(Italy) Simone Vagnozzi	6	6
(Slovenia) Mike Urbanija	1	2
(Croatia) Borut Puc	4	0
8	(Italy) Thomas Fabbiano	6	6

Qualifying competition
4	(Italy) Simone Vagnozzi	7	6
8	(Italy) Thomas Fabbiano	5	0
