= 2011 Aegon Championships =

- Date: 6–13 June
- Edition: 109th
- Category: ATP World Tour 250
- Draw: 56S / 24D
- Prize money: €608,000
- Surface: Grass / outdoor
- Location: London, United Kingdom
- Venue: Queen's Club

Champions

Singles
- (United Kingdom) Andy Murray

Doubles
- (United States) Bob Bryan / (United States) Mike Bryan
← 2010 ·	Queen's Club Championships	· 2012 →

The 2011 Aegon Championships (also known traditionally as the Queen's Club Championships) was a men's tennis tournament played on outdoor grass courts. It was the 109th edition of the Aegon Championships and was part of the ATP World Tour 250 series of the 2011 ATP World Tour. It took place at the Queen's Club in London, United Kingdom, in the club's 125th year. The tournament was scheduled to take place between 6 and 12 June 2011, however the finals were delayed to 13 June 2011 due to rain. The field was headlined by the 2008 champion and current world number one Rafael Nadal, four-time champion Andy Roddick, 2009 champion Andy Murray and defending champion Sam Querrey.

In the singles competition, the defending champion Sam Querrey lost in round three, paving the way for Andy Murray to win his second title; Murray became the first Briton since Gordan Lowe to win multiple Queen's titles. While in the doubles the defending champion was absent, Bob and Mike Bryan won their 4th Aegon doubles title, their first since 2005.

== Finals ==
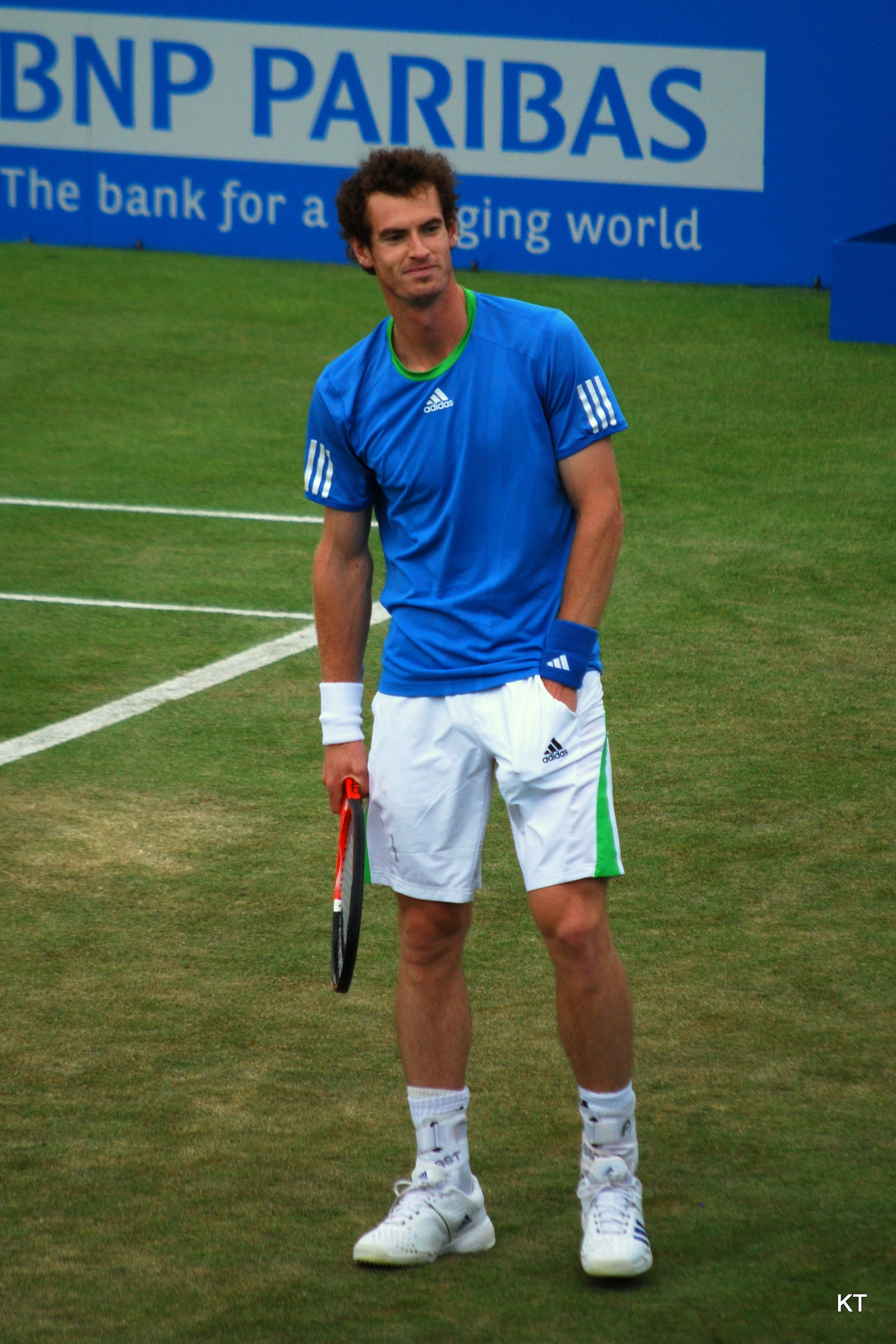
Andy Murray at the 2011 Aegon Championships

=== Singles ===
(United Kingdom) Andy Murray defeated (France) Jo-Wilfried Tsonga 3–6, 7–6^{(7–2)}, 6–4

- It was Murray's 1st title of the year and 17th of his career. It was his 2nd win at the event, also winning in 2009.

=== Doubles ===
(United States) Bob Bryan / (United States) Mike Bryan defeated (India) Mahesh Bhupathi / (India) Leander Paes, 6–7^{(2–7)}, 7–6^{(7–4)}, [10–6]

== Entries ==
=== Seeds ===
Country	Player	Rank^{1}	Seed
ESP	Rafael Nadal	1	1
GBR	Andy Murray	4	2
USA	Andy Roddick	11	3
SUI	Stanislas Wawrinka	14	4
FRA	Jo-Wilfried Tsonga	17	5
FRA	Gilles Simon	18	6
ESP	Fernando Verdasco	19	7
CRO	Marin Čilić	20	8
ARG	David Nalbandian	22	9
FRA	Michaël Llodra	23	10
BRA	Thomaz Bellucci	25	11
ARG	Juan Martín del Potro	26	12
USA	Sam Querrey	28	13
SRB	Janko Tipsarević	32	14
RSA	Kevin Anderson	35	15
CRO	Ivan Ljubičić	37	16

- ^{1} Seedings are based on the rankings of May 23, 2011.

=== Other entrants ===
The following players received wildcards into the singles main draw:

- (United Kingdom) Daniel Cox
- (United Kingdom) Oliver Golding
- (United States) Ryan Harrison
- (Argentina) David Nalbandian
- (United Kingdom) James Ward

The following players received entry from the qualifying draw:

- (Serbia) Ilija Bozoljac
- (France) Arnaud Clément
- (Australia) Matthew Ebden
- (United States) Bobby Reynolds

=== Notable withdrawals ===
- (Serbia) Novak Djokovic (patellar tendinitis)
- (United States) Mardy Fish (abdominal injury)
- (France) Richard Gasquet (leg injury)
