= Bedene =

Bedene is a Slovenian surname. Notable people with the surname include:

- Aljaž Bedene (born 1989), Slovenian tennis player
- Andraž Bedene (born 1989), Slovenian tennis player, twin brother of Aljaž
