= 2012 Aegon Championships – Singles =

Singles
- 2012 Aegon Championships

Final
- Champion: (Croatia) Marin Čilić
- Runner-up: (Argentina) David Nalbandian
- Score: 6–7^{(3–7)}, 4–3 default

Details
- Draw: 56
- Seeds: 16

Events
Singles	Doubles
← 2011 ·	Queen's Club Championships	· 2013 →

Marin Čilić won the singles tennis title at the 2012 Queen's Club Championships with the score at 6–7^{(3–7)}, 4–3, after David Nalbandian was defaulted from the tournament for kicking an advertising board, resulting in a cut leg for a line judge.

Andy Murray was the defending champion, but lost in the second round to Nicolas Mahut.

== Seeds ==
The top eight seeds receive a bye into the second round.

1. (United Kingdom) Andy Murray (second round)
2. (France) Jo-Wilfried Tsonga (third round)
3. (Serbia) Janko Tipsarević (third round)
4. (France) Gilles Simon (second round)
5. (Spain) Feliciano López (third round)
6. (Croatia) Marin Čilić (champion)
7. (United States) Andy Roddick (second round)
8. (France) Julien Benneteau (third round)
9. (South Africa) Kevin Anderson (quarterfinals)
10. (Argentina) David Nalbandian (final, disqualified)
11. (Cyprus) Marcos Baghdatis (second round)
12. (Uzbekistan) Denis Istomin (second round)
13. (Russia) Alex Bogomolov Jr.(second round)
14. (Luxembourg) Gilles Müller (second round)
15. (Japan) Go Soeda (second round)
16. (Croatia) Ivo Karlović (second round)

== Draw ==
=== Key ===
- Q = Qualifier
- WC = Wild card
- LL = Lucky loser
- Alt = Alternate
- ITF = ITF entry
- PR = Protected ranking
- SR = Special ranking
- SE = Special exempt
- JE = Junior exempt
- JR = Junior Accelerator Programme entrant
- CO = College Accelerator Programme entrant
- NG = Next Gen Accelerator Program entrant
- w/o = Walkover
- r = Retired
- d = Defaulted

=== Finals ===
Quarterfinals
(Bulgaria) Grigor Dimitrov	4	6	6
9	(South Africa) Kevin Anderson	6	4	3
(Belgium) Xavier Malisse	6	6^{2}	4
10	(Argentina) David Nalbandian	4	7^{7}	6
6	(Croatia) Marin Čilić	6	2
(Chinese Taipei) Lu Yen-hsun	4	0^{r}
(United States) Sam Querrey	7	3	6
(Croatia) Ivan Dodig	5	6	3

Semifinals
(Bulgaria) Grigor Dimitrov	4	4
10	(Argentina) David Nalbandian	6	6
6	(Croatia) Marin Čilić	6	3	6
(United States) Sam Querrey	3	6	3

Final
10	(Argentina) David Nalbandian	7^{7}	3^{d}
6	(Croatia) Marin Čilić	6^{3}	4

=== Top half ===
==== Section 1 ====
First round
(Spain) G García López	4	2
(France) N Mahut	6	6
Q	(United States) B Reynolds	3	5
(Bulgaria) G Dimitrov	6	7
WC	(United Kingdom) L Broady	2	1
14	(Luxembourg) G Müller	6	6
9	(South Africa) K Anderson	4	6	6
WC	(United Kingdom) J Ward	6	3	4
(Italy) F Cipolla	4	1
(Ukraine) S Stakhovsky	6	6
(Spain) R Ramírez Hidalgo	6^{2}	5
(Belgium) S Darcis	7^{7}	7

Second round
1	(United Kingdom) A Murray	3	7^{7}	6^{1}
(France) N Mahut	6	6^{4}	7^{7}
(Bulgaria) G Dimitrov	7^{7}	6
14	(Luxembourg) G Müller	6^{1}	4
9	(South Africa) K Anderson	7^{7}	2	3
(Ukraine) S Stakhovsky	6^{5}	6	4^{r}
(Belgium) S Darcis	3	6	5
5	(Spain) F López	6	3	7

Third round
(France) N Mahut	6^{3}	4
(Bulgaria) G Dimitrov	7^{7}	6
9	(South Africa) K Anderson	7^{12}	7^{9}
5	(Spain) F López	6^{10}	6^{7}

Quarterfinals
(Bulgaria) G Dimitrov	4	6	6
9	(South Africa) K Anderson	6	4	3

==== Section 2 ====
First round
(Italy) S Bolelli	6	6
(Latvia) E Gulbis	3	4
(Romania) A Ungur	4	4
(Belgium) X Malisse	6	6
(Slovakia) M Kližan	2	6^{5}
13	(Russia) A Bogomolov	6	7^{7}
10	(Argentina) D Nalbandian	4	6	6
(Canada) V Pospisil	6	2	2
(Tunisia) M Jaziri	4	6	3
Q	(Belgium) R Bemelmans	6	1	6
(France) É Roger-Vasselin	6^{5}	6	6
Q	(Kazakhstan) E Korolev	7^{7}	2	4

Second round
4	(France) G Simon	6	3	6^{2}
(Italy) S Bolelli	4	6	7^{7}
(Belgium) X Malisse	6	4	6
13	(Russia) A Bogomolov	3	6	0
10	(Argentina) D Nalbandian	6	6
Q	(Belgium) R Bemelmans	4	2
(France) É Roger-Vasselin	6	4	7
7	(United States) A Roddick	4	6	5

Third round
(Italy) S Bolelli	6^{5}	3
(Belgium) X Malisse	7^{7}	6
10	(Argentina) D Nalbandian	4	7	6
(France) É Roger-Vasselin	6	5	3

Quarterfinals
(Belgium) X Malisse	6	6^{2}	4
10	(Argentina) D Nalbandian	4	7^{7}	6

=== Bottom half ===
==== Section 3 ====
First round
(Australia) M Ebden	7^{7}	6
(Germany) M Bachinger	6^{5}	3
(Czech Republic) L Rosol	6	7^{7}
(Romania) V Hănescu	4	6^{5}
(Portugal) F Gil	6^{2}	6	2
11	(Cyprus) M Baghdatis	7^{7}	4	6
16	(Croatia) I Karlović	6	6
WC	(Australia) L Hewitt	3	2
(Chinese Taipei) Y-h Lu	4	7^{7}	6
(Russia) I Kunitsyn	6	6^{4}	3
(Russia) D Tursunov	4	6^{6}
LL	(United States) R Sweeting	6	7^{8}

Second round
6	(Croatia) M Čilić	6	6
(Australia) M Ebden	2	1
(Czech Republic) L Rosol	6	4	6
11	(Cyprus) M Baghdatis	3	6	4
16	(Croatia) I Karlović	6^{3}	7^{8}	6^{7}
(Chinese Taipei) Y-h Lu	7^{7}	6^{6}	7^{9}
LL	(United States) R Sweeting	1	6^{2}
3	(Serbia) J Tipsarević	6	7^{7}

Third round
6	(Croatia) M Čilić	7^{7}	6
(Czech Republic) L Rosol	6^{3}	2
(Chinese Taipei) Y-h Lu	6	2	7^{7}
3	(Serbia) J Tipsarević	3	6	6^{5}

Quarterfinals
6	(Croatia) M Čilić	6	2
(Chinese Taipei) Y-h Lu	4	0^{r}

==== Section 4 ====
First round
(Italy) P Lorenzi	6^{6}	6	2
(Japan) T Ito	7^{8}	4	6
(United States) S Querrey	6	6^{4}	6
(Belgium) O Rochus	1	7^{7}	4
Q	(France) K de Schepper	4	6^{4}
12	(Uzbekistan) D Istomin	6	7^{7}
15	(Japan) G Soeda	6	6
(Germany) B Phau	2	2
(Canada) F Dancevic	1	0^{r}
(Croatia) I Dodig	6	0
WC	(United Kingdom) J Baker	7^{7}	6
WC	(United Kingdom) O Golding	6^{1}	3

Second round
8	(France) J Benneteau	5	6	7
(Japan) T Ito	7	4	5
(United States) S Querrey	7^{7}	6
12	(Uzbekistan) D Istomin	6^{4}	3
15	(Japan) G Soeda	3	6^{3}
(Croatia) I Dodig	6	7^{7}
WC	(United Kingdom) J Baker	3	2
2	(France) J-W Tsonga	6	6

Third round
8	(France) J Benneteau	3	6	3
(United States) S Querrey	6	3	6
(Croatia) I Dodig	7^{7}	3	7^{7}
2	(France) J-W Tsonga	6^{3}	6	6^{5}

Quarterfinals
(United States) S Querrey	7	3	6
(Croatia) I Dodig	5	6	3

== Qualifying ==
=== Seeds ===
1. (United States) Ryan Sweeting (qualifying competition, lucky loser)
2. (Belgium) Ruben Bemelmans (qualified)
3. (United States) Bobby Reynolds (qualified)
4. (United States) Brian Baker (second round)
5. (Israel) Amir Weintraub (qualifying competition)
6. (France) Kenny de Schepper (qualified)
7. (Ukraine) Sergei Bubka (qualifying competition)
8. (United States) Denis Kudla (second round)

=== Qualifiers ===
1. (France) Kenny de Schepper
2. (Belgium) Ruben Bemelmans
3. (United States) Bobby Reynolds
4. (Kazakhstan) Evgeny Korolev

=== Lucky loser ===
1. (United States) Ryan Sweeting

=== Qualifying draw ===
==== First qualifier ====
First round
(Mexico) Manuel Sánchez	2	6^{3}
(Italy) Thomas Fabbiano	6	7^{7}
(Argentina) Lionel Noviski	6	6
(United Kingdom) Jamie Whiteford	2	1
(United States) Robby Ginepri	5	3
6	(France) Kenny de Schepper	7	6

Second round
1	(United States) Ryan Sweeting	7^{9}	7
(Italy) Thomas Fabbiano	6^{7}	5
(Argentina) Lionel Noviski	3	6^{3}
6	(France) Kenny de Schepper	6	7^{7}

Qualifying competition
1	(United States) Ryan Sweeting	2	2
6	(France) Kenny de Schepper	6	6

==== Second qualifier ====
First round
(France) Mathieu Rodrigues	7^{7}	3	7^{7}
(United Kingdom) Alex Bogdanovic	6^{2}	6	6^{3}
(Argentina) Marco Trungelliti	6^{4}	6	6
(Serbia) Dušan Lajović	7^{7}	3	4
(Poland) Michał Przysiężny	2	7^{7}	6^{3}
8	(United States) Denis Kudla	6	6^{4}	7^{7}

Second round
2	(Belgium) Ruben Bemelmans	6	6
(France) Mathieu Rodrigues	1	4
(Argentina) Marco Trungelliti	6	4	7^{7}
8	(United States) Denis Kudla	3	6	6^{2}

Qualifying competition
2	(Belgium) Ruben Bemelmans	6	6
(Argentina) Marco Trungelliti	2	2

==== Third qualifier ====
First round
(Bosnia and Herzegovina) Amer Delić	6	0^{r}
(United Kingdom) Andrew Fitzpatrick	2	2
(France) Romain Jouan	2	2
(United Kingdom) Chris Eaton	6	6
WC	(United Kingdom) Keelan Oakley	3	4
7	(Ukraine) Sergei Bubka	6	6

Second round
3	(United States) Bobby Reynolds	7	7
(United Kingdom) Andrew Fitzpatrick	5	5
(United Kingdom) Chris Eaton	3	6^{4}
7	(Ukraine) Sergei Bubka	6	7^{7}

Qualifying competition
3	(United States) Bobby Reynolds	7^{7}	6
7	(Ukraine) Sergei Bubka	6^{5}	1

==== Fourth qualifier ====
First round			Second round				Qualifying competition
			4/WC	(United States) Brian Baker	4	6^{5}
(Kazakhstan) Evgeny Korolev	6	6		(Kazakhstan) Evgeny Korolev	6	7^{7}
(France) Charles-Antoine Brézac	2	4						(Kazakhstan) Evgeny Korolev	6	6
(Germany) Frank Moser	4	4					5	(Israel) Amir Weintraub	3	2
(United States) Michael Yani	6	6		(United States) Michael Yani	6^{5}	1
			5	(Israel) Amir Weintraub	7	6
