= 2011 Aegon Championships – Doubles =

Doubles
- 2011 Aegon Championships

Final
- Champion: (United States) Bob Bryan (United States) Mike Bryan
- Runner-up: (India) Mahesh Bhupathi (India) Leander Paes
- Score: 6–7^{(2–7)}, 7–6^{(7–4)}, [10–6]

Details
- Draw: 24

Events
Singles	Doubles
← 2010 ·	Queen's Club Championships	· 2012 →

Novak Djokovic and Jonathan Erlich were the defending champions, but Djokovic decided not to compete, and Erlich chose to play at Halle instead.

Bob Bryan and Mike Bryan won the title, defeating Mahesh Bhupathi and Leander Paes 6–7^{(2–7)}, 7–6^{(7–4)}, [10–6] in the final.

== Seeds ==
All seeds received a bye into the second round.

1. (United States) Bob Bryan / (United States) Mike Bryan (champions)
2. (Belarus) Max Mirnyi / (Canada) Daniel Nestor (semifinals)
3. (India) Mahesh Bhupathi / (India) Leander Paes (final)
4. (France) Michaël Llodra / (Serbia) Nenad Zimonjić (second round, withdrew due to Llodra's leg injury)
5. (Austria) Oliver Marach / (Poland) Marcin Matkowski (semifinals)
6. (South Africa) Wesley Moodie / (Belgium) Dick Norman (second round)
7. (Sweden) Robert Lindstedt / (Romania) Horia Tecău (quarterfinals)
8. (Brazil) Marcelo Melo / (Brazil) Bruno Soares (second round)

== Draw ==
=== Key ===
- Q = Qualifier
- WC = Wild card
- LL = Lucky loser
- Alt = Alternate
- SE = Special exempt
- PR = Protected ranking
- ITF = ITF entry
- JE = Junior exempt
- w/o = Walkover
- r = Retired
- d = Defaulted
- SR = Special ranking

=== Finals ===
Semifinals
1	(United States) Bob Bryan (United States) Mike Bryan	6	6
5	(Austria) Oliver Marach (Poland) Marcin Matkowski	2	1
3	(India) Mahesh Bhupathi (India) Leander Paes	6^{7}	7^{8}	[10]
2	(Belarus) Max Mirnyi (Canada) Daniel Nestor	7^{9}	6^{6}	[8]

Final
1	(United States) Bob Bryan (United States) Mike Bryan	6^{2}	7^{7}	[10]
3	(India) Mahesh Bhupathi (India) Leander Paes	7^{7}	6^{4}	[6]

=== Top half ===
First round
(Croatia) M Čilić (Croatia) L Zovko	6	3	[7]
(Australia) A Fisher (Australia) S Huss	3	6	[10]
(Argentina) JM del Potro (Czech Republic) R Štěpánek	6	6
(Argentina) D Nalbandian (United States) A Roddick	3	4
(South Africa) K Anderson (Austria) J Knowle	6	7
Alt	(Spain) F Verdasco (Switzerland) S Wawrinka	1	5
(Belgium) X Malisse (United Kingdom) K Skupski	6	6
(United Kingdom) A Murray (United Kingdom) J Murray	3	4

Second round
1	(United States) B Bryan (United States) M Bryan	6	6
(Australia) A Fisher (Australia) S Huss	2	1
(Argentina) JM del Potro (Czech Republic) R Štěpánek	6	4	[11]
8	(Brazil) M Melo (Brazil) B Soares	3	6	[9]
4	(France) M Llodra (Serbia) N Zimonjić
(South Africa) K Anderson (Austria) J Knowle	w/o
(Belgium) X Malisse (United Kingdom) K Skupski	5	3
5	(Austria) O Marach (Poland) M Matkowski	7	6

Quarterfinals
1	(United States) B Bryan (United States) M Bryan	6	6^{4}	[10]
(Argentina) JM del Potro (Czech Republic) R Štěpánek	4	7^{7}	[3]
(South Africa) K Anderson (Austria) J Knowle	7^{7}	4	[6]
5	(Austria) O Marach (Poland) M Matkowski	6^{5}	6	[10]

Semifinals
1	(United States) B Bryan (United States) M Bryan	6	6
5	(Austria) O Marach (Poland) M Matkowski	2	1

=== Bottom half ===
First round
(Mexico) S González (United States) T Rettenmaier	6^{3}	6^{4}
(Slovakia) F Polášek (Slovakia) I Zelenay	7^{7}	7^{7}
WC	(United Kingdom) C Fleming (United Kingdom) R Hutchins	6	6
(Russia) I Kunitsyn (Croatia) I Ljubičić	2	4
(Spain) M López (Spain) R Nadal	7^{8}	6
(Brazil) T Bellucci (Brazil) A Sá	6^{6}	2
(United States) S Lipsky (United States) R Ram	6	7^{10}
(Sweden) S Aspelin (Australia) P Hanley	3	6^{8}

Second round
6	(South Africa) W Moodie (Belgium) D Norman	6	3	[5]
(Slovakia) F Polášek (Slovakia) I Zelenay	4	6	[10]
WC	(United Kingdom) C Fleming (United Kingdom) R Hutchins	4	6	[13]
3	(India) M Bhupathi (India) L Paes	6	1	[15]
7	(Sweden) R Lindstedt (Romania) H Tecău	7^{7}
(Spain) M López (Spain) R Nadal	6^{3}	r
(United States) S Lipsky (United States) R Ram	7^{8}	4	[5]
2	(Belarus) M Mirnyi (Canada) D Nestor	6^{6}	6	[10]

Quarterfinals
(Slovakia) F Polášek (Slovakia) I Zelenay	4	4
3	(India) M Bhupathi (India) L Paes	6	6
7	(Sweden) R Lindstedt (Romania) H Tecău	3	6	[7]
2	(Belarus) M Mirnyi (Canada) D Nestor	6	3	[10]

Semifinals
3	(India) M Bhupathi (India) L Paes	6^{7}	7^{8}	[10]
2	(Belarus) M Mirnyi (Canada) D Nestor	7^{9}	6^{6}	[8]
