= 2012 ATP Vegeta Croatia Open Umag – Doubles =

Doubles
- 2012 ATP Vegeta Croatia Open Umag
- 2011 Champions: (Italy) Simone Bolelli (Italy) Fabio Fognini

Final
- Champions: (Spain) David Marrero (Spain) Fernando Verdasco
- Runners-up: (Spain) Marcel Granollers (Spain) Marc López
- Score: 6–3, 7–6^{(7–4)}

Details
- Draw: 16
- Seeds: 4

Events
Singles	Doubles
← 2011 ·	Croatia Open	· 2013 →

Simone Bolelli and Fabio Fognini were the defending champions but Bolelli decided not to participate.
Fognini played alongside Daniele Bracciali but lost in the semifinals.
David Marrero and Fernando Verdasco won the tournament by beating Marcel Granollers and Marc López 6–3, 7–6^{(7–4)} in the final.

== Seeds ==
1. (Spain) Marcel Granollers / (Spain) Marc López (final)
2. (Italy) Daniele Bracciali / (Italy) Fabio Fognini (semifinals)
3. (Spain) David Marrero / (Spain) Fernando Verdasco (champions)
4. (Germany) Frank Moser / (France) Édouard Roger-Vasselin (withdrew)

== Draw ==
=== Key ===
- Q = Qualifier
- WC = Wild card
- LL = Lucky loser
- Alt = Alternate
- ITF = ITF entry
- PR = Protected ranking
- SR = Special ranking
- SE = Special exempt
- JE = Junior exempt
- JR = Junior Accelerator Programme entrant
- CO = College Accelerator Programme entrant
- NG = Next Gen Accelerator Program entrant
- w/o = Walkover
- r = Retired
- d = Defaulted

=== Draw ===
First round
1	(Spain) M Granollers (Spain) M López	6	6
WC	(Croatia) T Androić (Croatia) M Draganja	4	3
Alt	(Poland) M Kowalczyk (Czech Republic) D Škoch	3	2
(Argentina) C Berlocq (Uruguay) M Felder	6	6
Alt	(Serbia) N Čačić (Serbia) D Lajović	1	4
(Spain) A Menéndez (Spain) D Muñoz de la Nava	6	6
(Croatia) I Dodig (Croatia) M Pavić	7^{9}	6^{4}	[10]
(Slovakia) K Beck (Poland) T Bednarek	6^{7}	7^{7}	[7]
(Slovakia) M Kližan (Slovakia) I Zelenay	6	7^{7}
(Germany) M Bachinger (Germany) D Brands	2	6^{3}
(Italy) P Lorenzi (Italy) P Starace	1	3
3	(Spain) D Marrero (Spain) F Verdasco	6	6
(Slovenia) B Kavčič (Czech Republic) J Pospíšil	6	6
WC	(Croatia) F Škugor (Croatia) A Veić	1	3
(Croatia) M Čilić (Croatia) L Zovko	6	2	[6]
2	(Italy) D Bracciali (Italy) F Fognini	3	6	[10]

Quarterfinals
1	(Spain) M Granollers (Spain) M López	6	7^{7}
(Argentina) C Berlocq (Uruguay) M Felder	1	6^{3}
(Spain) A Menéndez (Spain) D Muñoz de la Nava	5	5
(Croatia) I Dodig (Croatia) M Pavić	7	7
(Slovakia) M Kližan (Slovakia) I Zelenay	3	4
3	(Spain) D Marrero (Spain) F Verdasco	6	6
(Slovenia) B Kavčič (Czech Republic) J Pospíšil	4	6^{4}
2	(Italy) D Bracciali (Italy) F Fognini	6	7^{7}

Semifinals
1	(Spain) M Granollers (Spain) M López	6	7
(Croatia) I Dodig (Croatia) M Pavić	4	5
3	(Spain) D Marrero (Spain) F Verdasco	6	6
2	(Italy) D Bracciali (Italy) F Fognini	1	3

Final
1	(Spain) M Granollers (Spain) M López	3	6^{4}
3	(Spain) D Marrero (Spain) F Verdasco	6	7^{7}
