= 2010 Aegon Championships =

- Date: 7–13 June
- Edition: 108th
- Category: ATP World Tour 250
- Draw: 56S / 24D
- Prize money: €627,700
- Surface: Grass / outdoor
- Location: London, United Kingdom
- Venue: Queen's Club

Champions

Singles
- (United States) Sam Querrey

Doubles
- (Serbia) Novak Djokovic / (Israel) Jonathan Erlich
← 2009 ·	Queen's Club Championships	· 2011 →

The 2010 Aegon Championships (also known traditionally as the Queen's Club Championships) was a tennis tournament played on outdoor grass courts. It was the 108Th edition of the Aegon Championships and was part of the ATP World Tour 250 series of the 2010 ATP World Tour. It took place at the Queen's Club in London, United Kingdom, from 7 to 13 June 2010. The field was headlined by the 2008 champion and current world number one Rafael Nadal, Novak Djokovic, Andy Roddick and defending champion Andy Murray.

== Finals ==
=== Singles ===
(United States) Sam Querrey defeated (United States) Mardy Fish 7–6^{(7–3)}, 7–5

- It was Querrey's third title of the year and 5th of his career. He won a title on all three surfaces during 2010 with the championship.

=== Doubles ===
(Serbia) Novak Djokovic / (Israel) Jonathan Erlich defeated (Slovakia) Karol Beck / (Czech Republic) David Škoch 7–6^{(8–6)}, 2–6, [10–3]

== Entries ==
=== Seeds ===
Player	Nationality	Ranking^{1}	Seeding
Rafael Nadal	Spain	2	1
Novak Djokovic	Serbia	3	2
Andy Murray	Great Britain	4	3
Andy Roddick	United States	8	4
Marin Čilić	Croatia	12	5
Gaël Monfils	France	15	6
Sam Querrey	United States	22	7
Feliciano López	Spain	31	8
Julien Benneteau	France	38	9
Janko Tipsarević	Serbia	43	10
Richard Gasquet	France	45	11
Michaël Llodra	France	48	12
Santiago Giraldo	Colombia	58	13
Dudi Sela	Israel	61	14
Andreas Seppi	Italy	66	15
Denis Istomin	Uzbekistan	72	16

- ^{1} Seedings are based on the rankings of 24 May 2010.

=== Other entrants ===
The following players received wildcards into the singles main draw:

- (United Kingdom) Jamie Baker
- (Bulgaria) Grigor Dimitrov
- (United States) Ryan Harrison
- (Australia) Bernard Tomic
- (United Kingdom) James Ward

The following players received entry from the qualifying draw:

- (United Kingdom) Alex Bogdanovic
- (Canada) Frank Dancevic
- (France) Nicolas Mahut
- (Russia) Dmitry Tursunov
