= 2011 ATP Studena Croatia Open – Doubles =

Doubles
- 2011 ATP Studena Croatia Open
- 2010 Champions: (Czech Republic) Leoš Friedl; (Slovakia) Filip Polášek

Final
- Champions: (Italy) Simone Bolelli (Italy) Fabio Fognini
- Runners-up: (Croatia) Marin Čilić (Croatia) Lovro Zovko
- Score: 6–3, 5–7, [10–7]

Details
- Draw: 16
- Seeds: 4

Events
Singles	Doubles
← 2010 ·	Croatia Open	· 2012 →

Leoš Friedl and Filip Polášek were the defending champions, but Polášek decided to participate in Gstaad instead.
As a result, Friedl played alongside David Škoch, but they were eliminated by Čilić and L Zovko in the quarterfinals.

Simone Bolelli and Fabio Fognini won the title, defeating Marin Čilić and Lovro Zovko 6–3, 5–7, [10–7] in the final.

== Seeds ==
1. (Czech Republic) Lukáš Dlouhý / (Slovakia) Michal Mertiňák (first round)
2. (Italy) Daniele Bracciali / (Mexico) Santiago González (semifinals)
3. (Spain) David Marrero / (Spain) Rubén Ramírez Hidalgo (first round)
4. (Germany) Dustin Brown / (Germany) Michael Kohlmann (quarterfinals)

== Draw ==
=== Key ===
- Q = Qualifier
- WC = Wild card
- LL = Lucky loser
- Alt = Alternate
- ITF = ITF entry
- PR = Protected ranking
- SR = Special ranking
- SE = Special exempt
- JE = Junior exempt
- JR = Junior Accelerator Programme entrant
- CO = College Accelerator Programme entrant
- NG = Next Gen Accelerator Program entrant
- w/o = Walkover
- r = Retired
- d = Defaulted

=== Draw ===
First round
1	(Czech Republic) L Dlouhý (Slovakia) M Mertiňák	6	6^{4}	[9]
(Czech Republic) L Friedl (Czech Republic) D Škoch	4	7^{7}	[11]
(Croatia) M Čilić (Croatia) L Zovko	6	6
Alt	(Slovenia) Al Bedene (Slovenia) An Bedene	2	4
4	(Germany) D Brown (Germany) M Kohlmann	1	7	[10]
(Italy) A Seppi (Italy) S Vagnozzi	6	5	[7]
(Slovenia) B Kavčič (Czech Republic) J Pospíšil	6	6
WC	(Croatia) M Draganja (Croatia) D Marcan	1	1
(Italy) S Bolelli (Italy) F Fognini	6	6
(Belgium) O Rochus (Ukraine) S Stakhovsky	2	4
(Croatia) I Dodig (Croatia) A Veić	7^{7}	7
3	(Spain) D Marrero (Spain) R Ramírez Hidalgo	6^{4}	5
(Brazil) F Ferreiro (Brazil) A Sá	7	6
WC	(Croatia) T Androić (Croatia) B Puc	5	3
(Argentina) D Junqueira (Spain) A Ramos	0	4
2	(Italy) D Bracciali (Mexico) S González	6	6

Quarterfinals
(Czech Republic) L Friedl (Czech Republic) D Škoch	3	0
(Croatia) M Čilić (Croatia) L Zovko	6	6
4	(Germany) D Brown (Germany) M Kohlmann	1	2
(Slovenia) B Kavčič (Czech Republic) J Pospíšil	6	6
(Italy) S Bolelli (Italy) F Fognini	6	2	[17]
(Croatia) I Dodig (Croatia) A Veić	4	6	[15]
(Brazil) F Ferreiro (Brazil) A Sá	2	4
2	(Italy) D Bracciali (Mexico) S González	6	6

Semifinals
(Croatia) M Čilić (Croatia) L Zovko	7^{7}	2	[10]
(Slovenia) B Kavčič (Czech Republic) J Pospíšil	6^{2}	6	[4]
(Italy) S Bolelli (Italy) F Fognini	7^{7}	1	[10]
2	(Italy) D Bracciali (Mexico) S González	6^{2}	6	[7]

Finals
(Croatia) M Čilić (Croatia) L Zovko	3	7	[7]
(Italy) S Bolelli (Italy) F Fognini	6	5	[10]
