= 2013 Aegon Championships =

- Date: 10–16 June
- Edition: 111th
- Category: ATP World Tour 250 series
- Draw: 56S / 24D
- Prize money: €779,665
- Surface: Grass
- Location: London, United Kingdom
- Venue: Queen's Club

Champions

Singles
- (United Kingdom) Andy Murray

Doubles
- (United States) Bob Bryan / (United States) Mike Bryan
- Queen's Club Championships

The 2013 Aegon Championships (also known traditionally as the Queen's Club Championships) was a men's tennis tournament played on outdoor grass courts. It was the 111th edition of those championships and was part of the ATP World Tour 250 series of the 2013 ATP World Tour. It took place at the Queen's Club in London, United Kingdom, in the club's 127th year between 10 and 16 June.

== Finals ==
=== Singles ===
- (United Kingdom) Andy Murray defeated (Croatia) Marin Čilić, 5–7, 7–5, 6–3

=== Doubles ===
- (United States) Bob Bryan / (United States) Mike Bryan defeated (Austria) Alexander Peya / (Brazil) Bruno Soares, 4–6, 7–5, [10–3]

== Singles main draw entrants ==
=== Seeds ===
Country	Player	Rank^{1}	Seed
GBR	Andy Murray	2	1
CZE	Tomáš Berdych	6	2
ARG	Juan Martín del Potro	7	3
FRA	Jo-Wilfried Tsonga	8	4
CRO	Marin Čilić	11	5
USA	Sam Querrey	20	6
UKR	Alexandr Dolgopolov	24	7
~~RSA~~	~~Kevin Anderson~~	~~25~~	~~8~~
FRA	Benoît Paire	26	9
BUL	Grigor Dimitrov	28	10
FRA	Julien Benneteau	32	11
CZE	Lukáš Rosol	36	12
FIN	Jarkko Nieminen	38	13
UZB	Denis Istomin	42	14
ESP	Pablo Andújar	45	15
SLO	Grega Žemlja	50	16

- Rankings are as of May 27, 2013.

=== Other entrants ===
The following players received wildcards into the singles main draw:

- (United Kingdom) Edward Corrie
- (Ukraine) Alexandr Dolgopolov
- (United Kingdom) Dan Evans
- (United Kingdom) Kyle Edmund
- (United Kingdom) James Ward

The following players received entry from the qualifying draw:

- (United Kingdom) Jamie Baker
- (Serbia) Ilija Bozoljac
- (Australia) Samuel Groth
- (Spain) Feliciano López

The following players received entry as lucky losers:

- (India) Rohan Bopanna
- (Denmark) Frederik Nielsen

=== Withdrawals ===
Before the tournament

- (South Africa) Kevin Anderson (shoulder injury)
- (United States) Brian Baker
- (Italy) Simone Bolelli
- (Brazil) Rogério Dutra da Silva
- (United States) Mardy Fish
- (Netherlands) Robin Haase
- (Slovakia) Lukáš Lacko
- (Chinese Taipei) Lu Yen-hsun
- (Luxembourg) Gilles Müller
- (Russia) Dmitry Tursunov

During the tournament

- (France) Michaël Llodra (harmstring injury)

== Doubles main draw entrants ==
=== Seeds ===
Country	Player	Country	Player	Rank^{1}	Seed
USA	Bob Bryan	USA	Mike Bryan	2	1
SWE	Robert Lindstedt	CAN	Daniel Nestor	11	2
IND	Mahesh Bhupathi	IND	Rohan Bopanna	17	3
AUT	Alexander Peya	BRA	Bruno Soares	27	4
GBR	Colin Fleming	GBR	Jonathan Marray	46	5
FRA	Julien Benneteau	SRB	Nenad Zimonjić	51	6
CRO	Ivan Dodig	BRA	Marcelo Melo	52	7
AUS	Paul Hanley	POL	Marcin Matkowski	68	8

- Rankings are as of May 27, 2013.

=== Other entrants ===
The following pairs received wildcards into the doubles main draw:

- (Australia) Lleyton Hewitt / (Australia) Bernard Tomic
- (United Kingdom) Jamie Murray / (Australia) John Peers

The following pairs received entry as alternates:

- (Netherlands) Thiemo de Bakker / (Netherlands) Igor Sijsling
- (Spain) Guillermo García-López / (Australia) John-Patrick Smith
- (France) Paul-Henri Mathieu / (Australia) Marinko Matosevic

=== Withdrawals ===
Before the tournament

- (South Africa) Kevin Anderson (shoulder injury)
- (France) Michaël Llodra (hamstring injury)
- (Australia) Bernard Tomic (hamstring injury)

During the tournament

- (France) Nicolas Mahut

== Rally against cancer ==
Following the finals on the last day, Andy Murray took part in a charity event called "Rally against Cancer" alongside former British no. 1 Tim Henman, in which they faced off against Murray's coach, former world no. 1 and 8-time Grand Slam champion Ivan Lendl, and world number 6 Tomas Berdych. The event was organised in order to raise money for the Royal Marsden Cancer Charity, after British Davis Cup player Ross Hutchins was diagnosed with Hodgkins Lymphoma at the end of 2012. Following the one set affair, in which the Brits emerged victorious, Murray and Henman then teamed up with a number of British celebrities, including comedians Jimmy Carr, Michael McIntyre and Jonathan Ross, actor Eddie Redmayne, businessman Sir Richard Branson and mayor of London Boris Johnson. The initial target for the event was £100,000, however this was exceeded by over £50,000 during the event. Furthermore, Murray donated his entire prize money pot of around £73,000 towards the charity.
