= 2012 ATP Vegeta Croatia Open Umag – Singles =

Singles
- 2012 ATP Vegeta Croatia Open Umag

Final
- Champion: (Croatia) Marin Čilić
- Runner-up: (Spain) Marcel Granollers
- Score: 6–4, 6–2

Details
- Draw: 28 (4 Q / 3 WC )
- Seeds: 8

Events
Singles	Doubles
- Croatia Open

Alexandr Dolgopolov was the defending champion but lost in the semifinals to Marin Čilić, who won the title by beating Marcel Granollers 6–4, 6–2 in the final.

== Seeds ==
The top four seeds receive a bye into the second round.

1. (Spain) Fernando Verdasco (semifinals)
2. (Croatia) Marin Čilić (champion)
3. (Ukraine) Alexandr Dolgopolov (semifinals)
4. (Spain) Marcel Granollers (final)
5. (Argentina) Carlos Berlocq (quarterfinals)
6. (Spain) Juan Carlos Ferrero (first round)
7. (Slovakia) Martin Kližan (second round)
8. (France) Édouard Roger-Vasselin (first round)

== Draw ==
Key

- Q = Qualifier
- WC = Wild card
- LL = Lucky loser
- Alt = Alternate
- ITF = ITF entry
- PR = Protected ranking
- SR = Special ranking
- SE = Special exempt
- JE = Junior exempt
- JR = Junior Accelerator Programme entrant
- CO = College Accelerator Programme entrant
- NG = Next Gen Accelerator Program entrant
- w/o = Walkover
- r = Retired
- d = Defaulted

=== Finals ===
Semifinals
1	(Spain) Fernando Verdasco	2	7^{7}	1
4	(Spain) Marcel Granollers	6	6^{5}	6
3	(Ukraine) Alexandr Dolgopolov	5	2
2	(Croatia) Marin Čilić	7	6

Final
4	(Spain) Marcel Granollers	4	2
2	(Croatia) Marin Čilić	6	6

=== Top half ===
First round
(Latvia) E Gulbis	6	6
Q	(Spain) G Fraile	1	3
(Spain) D Muñoz de la Nava	3	7	6^{5}
WC	(Russia) A Kuznetsov	6	5	7^{7}
WC	(Croatia) M Pavić	6	6
6	(Spain) JC Ferrero	2	2
(Italy) P Starace	6	7^{8}
Q	(Slovakia) I Klec	3	6^{6}
(Portugal) J Sousa	7^{7}	1	6^{6}
(Germany) M Bachinger	6^{5}	6	7^{8}
WC	(Slovenia) A Bedene	2	2
7	(Slovakia) M Kližan	6	6

Second round
1	(Spain) F Verdasco	6	3	6
(Latvia) E Gulbis	2	6	1
WC	(Russia) A Kuznetsov	7^{7}	6
WC	(Croatia) M Pavić	6^{0}	1
4	(Spain) M Granollers	6	3	6
(Italy) P Starace	4	6	3
(Germany) M Bachinger	6	2	6
7	(Slovakia) M Kližan	0	6	4

Quarterfinals
1	(Spain) F Verdasco	6	6
WC	(Russia) A Kuznetsov	2	2
4	(Spain) M Granollers	1	6	7
(Germany) M Bachinger	6	3	5

Semifinals
1	(Spain) F Verdasco	2	7^{7}	1
4	(Spain) M Granollers	6	6^{5}	6

=== Bottom half ===
First round
5	(Argentina) C Berlocq	6	6
(Croatia) I Dodig	4	0
Q	(Argentina) M Trungelliti	7	6
(Italy) P Lorenzi	5	4
(Slovakia) K Beck	3	1
(Italy) F Fognini	6	6
8	(France) É Roger-Vasselin	7^{7}	2	5
(United States) W Odesnik	6^{4}	6	7
(Slovenia) B Kavčič	6	6
(Croatia) A Veić	2	2
(Germany) D Brands	6	7^{10}
Q	(Italy) W Trusendi	1	6^{8}

Second round
5	(Argentina) C Berlocq	7^{7}	4	6
Q	(Argentina) M Trungelliti	6^{4}	6	1
(Italy) F Fognini	2	4
3	(Ukraine) A Dolgopolov	6	6
(United States) W Odesnik	3	7	7^{7}
(Slovenia) B Kavčič	6	5	6^{3}
(Germany) D Brands	3	2
2	(Croatia) M Čilić	6	6

Quarterfinals
5	(Argentina) C Berlocq	4	4
3	(Ukraine) A Dolgopolov	6	6
(United States) W Odesnik	4	0
2	(Croatia) M Čilić	6	6

Semifinals
3	(Ukraine) A Dolgopolov	5	2
2	(Croatia) M Čilić	7	6

== Qualifying ==
=== Seeds ===
1. (Italy) Matteo Viola (qualifying competition)
2. (Serbia) Dušan Lajović (qualifying competition)
3. (Bosnia and Herzegovina) Damir Džumhur (second round)
4. (Spain) Adrián Menéndez Maceiras (qualifying competition)
5. (Italy) Simone Vagnozzi (second round)
6. (Argentina) Marco Trungelliti (qualified)
7. (Uruguay) Marcel Felder (second round)
8. (Serbia) Nikola Ćaćić (first round)

=== Qualifiers ===
1. (Slovakia) Ivo Klec
2. (Spain) Gorka Fraile
3. (Italy) Walter Trusendi
4. (Argentina) Marco Trungelliti

=== Draw ===
==== First qualifier ====
First round
1	(Italy) Matteo Viola	6	6
(Croatia) Marcel Ružić	2	0
(Germany) Frank Moser	6^{6}	2
(Germany) Ivo Mijić	7^{8}	6
(Switzerland) Yann Marti	4	0
(Slovakia) Ivo Klec	6	6
(Serbia) Danilo Petrović	6	2	6^{5}
7	(Uruguay) Marcel Felder	3	6	7

Second round
1	(Italy) Matteo Viola	7	6
(Germany) Ivo Mijić	5	1
(Slovakia) Ivo Klec	6	3	6
7	(Uruguay) Marcel Felder	4	6	3

Qualifying competition
1	(Italy) Matteo Viola	6	4	4
(Slovakia) Ivo Klec	2	6	6

==== Second qualifier ====
First round
2	(Serbia) Dušan Lajović	6	6
(Croatia) Filip Veger	2	1
(Italy) Viktor Galović	6	6
(Ukraine) Alexandr Kushakov	0	3
(Slovenia) Sašo Bende	6^{3}	3
(Bosnia and Herzegovina) Tomislav Brkić	7^{7}	6
(Spain) Gorka Fraile	6	6
8	(Serbia) Nikola Ćaćić	1	0

Second round
2	(Serbia) Dušan Lajović	7^{7}	7^{7}
(Italy) Viktor Galović	6^{3}	6^{5}
(Bosnia and Herzegovina) Tomislav Brkić	5	4
(Spain) Gorka Fraile	7	6

Qualifying competition
2	(Serbia) Dušan Lajović	6	4	4
(Spain) Gorka Fraile	4	6	6

==== Third qualifier ====
First round
3	(Bosnia and Herzegovina) Damir Džumhur	6	6
WC	(Croatia) Lovro Zovko	3	4
(Italy) Walter Trusendi	3	6	6
(Serbia) Saša Stojisavljević	6	2	3
WC	(Croatia) Filip Serdarušić	0	1
(Austria) Bastian Trinker	6	6
(Croatia) Joško Topić	6	3	1
5	(Italy) Simone Vagnozzi	2	6	6

Second round
3	(Bosnia and Herzegovina) Damir Džumhur	3	3
(Italy) Walter Trusendi	6	6
(Austria) Bastian Trinker	6^{2}	6	7^{7}
5	(Italy) Simone Vagnozzi	7^{7}	2	6^{5}

Qualifying competition
(Italy) Walter Trusendi	6	6
(Austria) Bastian Trinker	2	4

==== Fourth qualifier ====
First round
4	(Spain) Adrián Menéndez Maceiras	3	7^{8}	7
(Croatia) Mate Delić	6	6^{6}	5
(Argentina) Matias Castro	1	2
(Croatia) Marin Bradarić	6	6
Alt	(Slovenia) Mike Urbanija	6	3	3
WC	(Spain) José Antonio Salazar Martín	4	6	6
(Argentina) Juan-Martín Aranguren	3	2
6	(Argentina) Marco Trungelliti	6	6

Second round
4	(Spain) Adrián Menéndez Maceiras	6	1	7
(Croatia) Marin Bradarić	4	6	5
WC	(Spain) José Antonio Salazar Martín	6^{4}	3
6	(Argentina) Marco Trungelliti	7^{7}	6

Qualifying competition
4	(Spain) Adrián Menéndez Maceiras	3	2
6	(Argentina) Marco Trungelliti	6	6
