= 2010 Aegon Championships – Singles =

Singles
- 2010 Aegon Championships

Final
- Champion: (United States) Sam Querrey
- Runner-up: (United States) Mardy Fish
- Score: 7–6^{(7–3)}, 7–5

Details
- Draw: 56
- Seeds: 16

Events
Singles	Doubles
- Queen's Club Championships

Andy Murray was the defending champion, but lost in the third round to Mardy Fish.
Sam Querrey won in the final 7–6^{(7–3)}, 7–5 against Fish.

== Seeds ==
The top eight seeds receive a bye into the second round.

1. (Spain) Rafael Nadal (quarterfinals)
2. (Serbia) Novak Djokovic (third round)
3. (United Kingdom) Andy Murray (third round)
4. (United States) Andy Roddick (third round)
5. (Croatia) Marin Čilić (third round)
6. (France) Gaël Monfils (second round)
7. (United States) Sam Querrey (champion)
8. (Spain) Feliciano López (semifinals)
9. (France) Julien Benneteau (third round)
10. (Serbia) Janko Tipsarević (first round)
11. (France) Richard Gasquet (third round, withdrew because of a back injury)
12. (France) Michaël Llodra (quarterfinals)
13. (Colombia) Santiago Giraldo (second round)
14. (Israel) Dudi Sela (quarterfinals)
15. (Italy) Andreas Seppi (first round)
16. (Uzbekistan) Denis Istomin (third round)

== Draw ==
Key

- Q = Qualifier
- WC = Wild card
- LL = Lucky loser
- Alt = Alternate
- ITF = ITF entry
- PR = Protected ranking
- SR = Special ranking
- SE = Special exempt
- JE = Junior exempt
- JR = Junior Accelerator Programme entrant
- CO = College Accelerator Programme entrant
- NG = Next Gen Accelerator Program entrant
- w/o = Walkover
- r = Retired
- d = Defaulted

=== Finals ===
Quarterfinals
1	(Spain) Rafael Nadal	6^{5}	4
8	(Spain) Feliciano López	7^{7}	6
(United States) Mardy Fish	6	6
12	(France) Michaël Llodra	4	4
(Germany) Rainer Schüttler	7	6
14	(Israel) Dudi Sela	5	4
7	(United States) Sam Querrey	6	7
(Belgium) Xavier Malisse	3	5

Semifinals
8	(Spain) Feliciano López	3	4
(United States) Mardy Fish	6	6
(Germany) Rainer Schüttler	7^{11}	5	3
7	(United States) Sam Querrey	6^{9}	7	6

Final
(United States) Mardy Fish	6^{3}	5
7	(United States) Sam Querrey	7^{7}	7

=== Top half ===
==== Section 1 ====
First round
(Brazil) M Daniel	6	6
(Slovenia) B Kavčič	1	4
Q	(Canada) F Dancevic	5	7^{7}	4
(Jamaica) D Brown	7	6^{4}	6
WC	(United Kingdom) J Baker	1	4
16	(Uzbekistan) D Istomin	6	6
9	(France) J Benneteau	6	6
(France) A Clément	2	4
(United States) T Dent	7^{9}	3	5
(South Africa) K Anderson	6^{7}	6	7
Q	(United Kingdom) A Bogdanovic	6	3	4
WC	(Bulgaria) G Dimitrov	4	6	6

Second round
1	(Spain) R Nadal	6	6
(Brazil) M Daniel	2	2
(Jamaica) D Brown	6^{7}	4
16	(Uzbekistan) D Istomin	7^{9}	6
9	(France) J Benneteau	7	6
(South Africa) K Anderson	5	3
WC	(Bulgaria) G Dimitrov	2	4
8	(Spain) F López	6	6

Third round
1	(Spain) R Nadal	7^{7}	4	6
16	(Uzbekistan) D Istomin	6^{4}	6	4
9	(France) J Benneteau	2	4
8	(Spain) F López	6	6

Quarterfinals
1	(Spain) R Nadal	6^{5}	4
8	(Spain) F López	7^{7}	6

==== Section 2 ====
First round
(Spain) I Navarro	6	6
(Austria) D Köllerer	3	4
(United States) M Fish	6	6
(India) S Devvarman	1	4
(Kazakhstan) E Korolev	6^{6}	6	3
13	(Colombia) S Giraldo	7^{8}	4	6
12	(France) M Llodra	6	6
(Kazakhstan) A Golubev	3	2
(United States) J Levine	6	6
WC	(United States) R Harrison	3	3
Q	(France) N Mahut	7^{7}	6
(Chinese Taipei) Y-H Lu	6^{2}	4

Second round
3	(United Kingdom) A Murray	7^{10}	6
(Spain) I Navarro	6^{8}	3
(United States) M Fish	7^{7}	6
13	(Colombia) S Giraldo	6^{5}	2
12	(France) M Llodra	6	6
(United States) J Levine	4	2
Q	(France) N Mahut	7^{7}	3	2
5	(Croatia) M Čilić	6^{5}	6	6

Third round
3	(United Kingdom) A Murray	4	6	6^{2}
(United States) M Fish	6	1	7^{7}
12	(France) M Llodra	7^{7}	6
5	(Croatia) M Čilić	6^{2}	2

Quarterfinals
(United States) M Fish	6	6
12	(France) M Llodra	4	4

=== Bottom half ===
==== Section 3 ====
First round
(Germany) R Schüttler	6	6
(Spain) D Gimeno Traver	1	2
(Slovakia) K Beck	6	3	4
(United States) R Ram	1	6	6
PR	(Japan) K Nishikori	3	3
11	(France) R Gasquet	6	6
14	(Israel) D Sela	6^{4}	7^{7}	6
PR	(Australia) C Guccione	7^{7}	6^{5}	4
(Poland) M Przysiężny	6^{3}	3
PR	(Luxembourg) G Müller	7^{7}	6
(Russia) I Kunitsyn	1	6	6
(Ukraine) I Marchenko	6	4	3

Second round
6	(France) G Monfils	3	7^{7}	2
(Germany) R Schüttler	6	6^{4}	6
(United States) R Ram	3	5
11	(France) R Gasquet	6	7
14	(Israel) D Sela	7	6
PR	(Luxembourg) G Müller	5	2
(Russia) I Kunitsyn	2	1
4	(United States) A Roddick	6	6

Third round
(Germany) R Schüttler	w/o
11	(France) R Gasquet
14	(Israel) D Sela	6	7^{10}
4	(United States) A Roddick	4	6^{8}

Quarterfinals
(Germany) R Schüttler	7	6
14	(Israel) D Sela	5	4

==== Section 4 ====
First round
WC	(United Kingdom) J Ward	3	5
(United States) R Ginepri	6	7
(France) M Gicquel	7^{8}	6
(United States) M Russell	6^{6}	3
(Spain) M Granollers	6	3	6
10	(Serbia) J Tipsarević	4	6	3
15	(Italy) A Seppi	3	7	3
WC	(Australia) B Tomic	6	5	6
(Belgium) X Malisse	6	7^{7}
Q	(Russia) D Tursunov	2	6^{3}
(Italy) P Lorenzi	6	6
(Spain) P Riba	4	4

Second round
7	(United States) S Querrey	7^{7}	6
(United States) R Ginepri	6^{4}	2
(France) M Gicquel	1	4
(Spain) M Granollers	6	6
WC	(Australia) B Tomic	2	6	2
(Belgium) X Malisse	6	3	6
(Italy) P Lorenzi	3	3
2	(Serbia) N Djokovic	6	6

Third round
7	(United States) S Querrey	6	7^{7}
(Spain) M Granollers	4	6^{5}
(Belgium) X Malisse	6	4	6
2	(Serbia) N Djokovic	3	6	2

Quarterfinals
7	(United States) S Querrey	6	7
(Belgium) X Malisse	3	5
