= 2012 Aegon Championships – Doubles =

Doubles
- 2012 Aegon Championships

Final
- Champion: (Belarus) Max Mirnyi (Canada) Daniel Nestor
- Runner-up: (United States) Bob Bryan (United States) Mike Bryan
- Score: 6–3, 6–4

Details
- Draw: 24

Events
Singles	Doubles
← 2011 ·	Queen's Club Championships	· 2013 →

Bob Bryan and Mike Bryan were the defending champions but lost in the final to top seeds Max Mirnyi and Daniel Nestor, 6–3, 6–4.

== Seeds ==
1. (Belarus) Max Mirnyi / (Canada) Daniel Nestor (champions)
2. (United States) Bob Bryan / (United States) Mike Bryan (final)
3. (Poland) Mariusz Fyrstenberg / (Poland) Marcin Matkowski (second round)
4. (Sweden) Robert Lindstedt / (Romania) Horia Tecău (second round)
5. (India) Mahesh Bhupathi / (India) Rohan Bopanna (quarterfinals)
6. (United Kingdom) Colin Fleming / (United Kingdom) Ross Hutchins (quarterfinals)
7. (Serbia) Janko Tipsarević / (Serbia) Nenad Zimonjić (semifinals)
8. (United States) Eric Butorac / (Australia) Paul Hanley (semifinals)

== Draw ==
=== Key ===
- Q = Qualifier
- WC = Wild card
- LL = Lucky loser
- Alt = Alternate
- SE = Special exempt
- PR = Protected ranking
- ITF = ITF entry
- JE = Junior exempt
- w/o = Walkover
- r = Retired
- d = Defaulted
- SR = Special ranking

=== Finals ===
Semifinals
1	(Belarus) Max Mirnyi (Canada) Daniel Nestor	6	6
8	(United States) Eric Butorac (Australia) Paul Hanley	4	3
7	(Serbia) Janko Tipsarević (Serbia) Nenad Zimonjić	6^{2}	7^{7}	[3]
2	(United States) Bob Bryan (United States) Mike Bryan	7^{7}	6^{5}	[10]

Final
1	(Belarus) Max Mirnyi (Canada) Daniel Nestor	6	6
2	(United States) Bob Bryan (United States) Mike Bryan	3	4

=== Top half ===
First round
WC	(Australia) L Hewitt (United States) A Roddick	7^{7}	7^{7}
(Chinese Taipei) Y-h Lu (United States) S Querrey	6^{5}	6^{3}
(Cyprus) M Baghdatis (United Kingdom) J Murray	7^{7}	6
(Italy) S Bolelli (Luxembourg) G Müller	6^{5}	4
(Israel) J Erlich (Israel) A Ram	6	7^{7}
(Croatia) M Čilić (Croatia) L Zovko	2	6^{5}
(Croatia) I Karlović (Germany) F Moser	3	7^{8}	[10]
WC	(United Kingdom) J Delgado (United Kingdom) K Skupski	6	6^{6}	[4]

Second round
1	(Belarus) M Mirnyi (Canada) D Nestor	6	7
WC	(Australia) L Hewitt (United States) A Roddick	2	5
(Cyprus) M Baghdatis (United Kingdom) J Murray	3	6^{5}
5	(India) M Bhupathi (India) R Bopanna	6	7^{6}
4	(Sweden) R Lindstedt (Romania) H Tecău	3	2
(Israel) J Erlich (Israel) A Ram	6	6
(Croatia) I Karlović (Germany) F Moser	4	4
8	(United States) E Butorac (Australia) P Hanley	6	6

Quarterfinals
1	(Belarus) M Mirnyi (Canada) D Nestor	7^{9}	6
5	(India) M Bhupathi (India) R Bopanna	6^{7}	4
(Israel) J Erlich (Israel) A Ram	2	4
8	(United States) E Butorac (Australia) P Hanley	6	6

Semifinals
1	(Belarus) M Mirnyi (Canada) D Nestor	6	6
8	(United States) E Butorac (Australia) P Hanley	4	3

=== Bottom half ===
First round
(South Africa) K Anderson (India) L Paes	6^{1}	7	[10]
(France) J Benneteau (France) N Mahut	7^{7}	5	[5]
(Spain) D Marrero (Spain) R Ramírez Hidalgo	1	2
(Belgium) X Malisse (Belgium) D Norman	6	6
(France) É Roger-Vasselin (France) G Simon	5	4
Alt	(Belgium) S Darcis (Belgium) O Rochus	7	6
(Russia) M Elgin (Uzbekistan) D Istomin	6	6^{4}	[6]
(Russia) A Bogomolov Jr. (United States) J Cerretani	3	7^{7}	[10]

Second round
7	(Serbia) J Tipsarević (Serbia) N Zimonjić	2	6	[10]
(South Africa) K Anderson (India) L Paes	6	4	[7]
(Belgium) X Malisse (Belgium) D Norman	6	6
3	(Poland) M Fyrstenberg (Poland) M Matkowski	4	2
6	(United Kingdom) C Fleming (United Kingdom) R Hutchins	6	6
Alt	(Belgium) S Darcis (Belgium) O Rochus	2	2
(Russia) A Bogomolov Jr. (United States) J Cerretani	1	6^{1}
2	(United States) B Bryan (United States) M Bryan	6	7^{7}

Quarterfinals
7	(Serbia) J Tipsarević (Serbia) N Zimonjić	7^{7}	7^{8}
(Belgium) X Malisse (Belgium) D Norman	6^{3}	6^{6}
6	(United Kingdom) C Fleming (United Kingdom) R Hutchins	3	4
2	(United States) B Bryan (United States) M Bryan	6	6

Semifinals
7	(Serbia) J Tipsarević (Serbia) N Zimonjić	6^{2}	7^{7}	[3]
2	(United States) B Bryan (United States) M Bryan	7^{7}	6^{5}	[10]
