= 2013 Aegon Championships – Doubles =

Doubles
- 2013 Aegon Championships

Final
- Champions: (United States) Bob Bryan (United States) Mike Bryan
- Runners-up: (Austria) Alexander Peya (Brazil) Bruno Soares
- Score: 4–6, 7–5, [10–3]

Details
- Draw: 24

Events
Singles	Doubles
← 2012 ·	Aegon Championships	· 2014 →

Max Mirnyi and Daniel Nestor were the defending champions, but Mirnyi decided not to participate.
Nestor played alongside Robert Lindstedt, but lost to Marin Čilić and Juan Martín del Potro in the second round.
Bob and Mike Bryan won the title after defeating Alexander Peya and Bruno Soares 4–6, 7–5, [10–3] in the final.

== Seeds ==
All seeds received byes into the second round.

1. (United States) Bob Bryan / (United States) Mike Bryan (champions)
2. (Sweden) Robert Lindstedt / (Canada) Daniel Nestor (second round)
3. (India) Mahesh Bhupathi / (India) Rohan Bopanna (semifinals)
4. (Austria) Alexander Peya / (Brazil) Bruno Soares (final)
5. (United Kingdom) Colin Fleming / (United Kingdom) Jonathan Marray (quarterfinals)
6. (France) Julien Benneteau / (Serbia) Nenad Zimonjić (semifinals)
7. (Croatia) Ivan Dodig / (Brazil) Marcelo Melo (second round)
8. (Australia) Paul Hanley / (Poland) Marcin Matkowski (second round)

== Draw ==
=== Key ===
- Q = Qualifier
- WC = Wild card
- LL = Lucky loser
- Alt = Alternate
- SE = Special exempt
- PR = Protected ranking
- ITF = ITF entry
- JE = Junior exempt
- w/o = Walkover
- r = Retired
- d = Defaulted
- SR = Special ranking

=== Finals ===
Semi-finals
1	(United States) Bob Bryan (United States) Mike Bryan	6	6
3	(India) Mahesh Bhupathi (India) Rohan Bopanna	4	2
4	(Austria) Alexander Peya (Brazil) Bruno Soares	7	6
6	(France) Julien Benneteau (Serbia) Nenad Zimonjić	5	2

Final
1	(United States) Bob Bryan (United States) Mike Bryan	4	7	[10]
4	(Austria) Alexander Peya (Brazil) Bruno Soares	6	5	[3]

=== Top half ===
First round
Alt	(Spain) G García-López (Australia) J-P Smith	6^{8}	6	[10]
(Belgium) X Malisse (United States) R Ram	7^{10}	3	[5]
WC	(United Kingdom) J Murray (Australia) J Peers	7^{7}	6
(Bulgaria) G Dimitrov (Denmark) F Nielsen	6^{5}	3
(Finland) J Nieminen (France) G Simon	5	5
(France) N Mahut (France) J-W Tsonga	7	7
Alt	(Netherlands) T de Bakker (Netherlands) I Sijsling	2	5
(France) B Paire (France) É Roger-Vasselin	6	7

Second round
1	(United States) B Bryan (United States) M Bryan	7^{7}	7
Alt	(Spain) G García-López (Australia) J-P Smith	6^{2}	5
WC	(United Kingdom) J Murray (Australia) J Peers	7	7^{7}
7	(Croatia) I Dodig (Brazil) M Melo	5	6^{2}
3	(India) M Bhupathi (India) R Bopanna	w/o
(France) N Mahut (France) J-W Tsonga
(France) B Paire (France) É Roger-Vasselin	6^{4}	6	[6]
5	(United Kingdom) C Fleming (United Kingdom) J Marray	7^{7}	3	[10]

Quarter-finals
1	(United States) B Bryan (United States) M Bryan	7^{7}	6^{9}	[11]
WC	(United Kingdom) J Murray (Australia) J Peers	6^{5}	7^{11}	[9]
3	(India) M Bhupathi (India) R Bopanna	7^{7}	4	[10]
5	(United Kingdom) C Fleming (United Kingdom) J Marray	6^{5}	6	[4]

Semi-finals
1	(United States) B Bryan (United States) M Bryan	6	6
3	(India) M Bhupathi (India) R Bopanna	4	2

=== Bottom half ===
First round
Alt	(France) P-H Mathieu (Australia) M Matosevic	6	3	[5]
(United States) R Harrison (United States) S Querrey	4	6	[10]
(Sweden) J Brunström (South Africa) R Klaasen	6	6
PR	(United States) E Butorac (Israel) A Ram	3	3
(Serbia) V Troicki (Slovenia) G Žemlja	7	7^{7}
(Austria) O Marach (Czech Republic) L Rosol	5	6^{2}
(Croatia) M Čilić (Argentina) JM del Potro	6	6
(Spain) P Andújar (Spain) F López	2	4

Second round
8	(Australia) P Hanley (Poland) M Matkowski	7^{7}	3	[7]
(United States) R Harrison (United States) S Querrey	6^{2}	6	[10]
(Sweden) J Brunström (South Africa) R Klaasen	2	2
4	(Austria) A Peya (Brazil) B Soares	6	6
6	(France) J Benneteau (Serbia) N Zimonjić	6	6
(Serbia) V Troicki (Slovenia) G Žemlja	4	3
(Croatia) M Čilić (Argentina) JM del Potro	6	6^{5}	[10]
2	(Sweden) R Lindstedt (Canada) D Nestor	3	7^{7}	[6]

Quarter-finals
(United States) R Harrison (United States) S Querrey	4	6	[5]
4	(Austria) A Peya (Brazil) B Soares	6	1	[10]
6	(France) J Benneteau (Serbia) N Zimonjić	5	7	[10]
(Croatia) M Čilić (Argentina) JM del Potro	7	5	[8]

Semi-finals
4	(Austria) A Peya (Brazil) B Soares	7	6
6	(France) J Benneteau (Serbia) N Zimonjić	5	2
