= 2010 Aegon Championships – Doubles =

Doubles
- 2010 Aegon Championships

Final
- Champions: (Serbia) Novak Djokovic; (Israel) Jonathan Erlich
- Runners-up: (Slovakia) Karol Beck; (Czech Republic) David Škoch
- Score: 6–7^{(6–8)}, 6–2, [10–3]

Details
- Draw: 24

Events
Singles	Doubles
- Queen's Club Championships

The 2010 Aegon Championships (also known traditionally as the Queen's Club Championships) was a tennis tournament played on outdoor grass courts. Wesley Moodie and Mikhail Youzhny are the defending champions, but Youzhny chose to compete at Halle instead.
Moodie teamed up with Dick Norman, but they lost in the quarterfinals to Novak Djokovic and Jonathan Erlich.
Djokovic and Erlich won in the final 6–7^{(6–8)}, 6–2, [10–3] against Karol Beck and David Škoch.

== Seeds ==
All seeds receive a bye into the second round.

1. (Canada) Daniel Nestor / (Serbia) Nenad Zimonjić (semifinals)
2. (South Africa) Wesley Moodie / (Belgium) Dick Norman (quarterfinals)
3. (Sweden) Simon Aspelin / (Australia) Paul Hanley (second round)
4. (Poland) Mariusz Fyrstenberg / (Poland) Marcin Matkowski (second round)
5. (United States) Mardy Fish / (The Bahamas) Mark Knowles (quarterfinals)
6. (Sweden) Robert Lindstedt / (Romania) Horia Tecău (quarterfinals)
7. (Brazil) Marcelo Melo / (Brazil) Bruno Soares (second round)
8. (France) Julien Benneteau / (France) Michaël Llodra (semifinals)

== Draw ==
Key

- Q = Qualifier
- WC = Wild card
- LL = Lucky loser
- Alt = Alternate
- ITF = ITF entry
- PR = Protected ranking
- SR = Special ranking
- SE = Special exempt
- JE = Junior exempt
- JR = Junior Accelerator Programme entrant
- CO = College Accelerator Programme entrant
- NG = Next Gen Accelerator Program entrant
- w/o = Walkover
- r = Retired
- d = Defaulted

=== Finals ===
Semifinals

Final

1
- (Canada) Daniel Nestor
- (Serbia) Nenad Zimonjić
3
4

- (Slovakia) Karol Beck
- (Czech Republic) David Škoch
6
6

- (Slovakia) Karol Beck
- (Czech Republic) David Škoch
7^{8}
2
[3]

- (Serbia) Novak Djokovic
- (Israel) Jonathan Erlich
6^{6}
6
[10]

8
- (France) Julien Benneteau
- (France) Michaël Llodra
7^{9}
3
[6]

- (Serbia) Novak Djokovic
- (Israel) Jonathan Erlich
6^{7}
6
[10]

=== Top half ===
First round

Second round

Quarterfinals

Semifinals

1
- (Canada) D Nestor
- (Serbia) N Zimonjić
6
3
[10]

- (United Kingdom) C Fleming
- (United Kingdom) K Skupski
6
6

- (United Kingdom) C Fleming
- (United Kingdom) K Skupski
4
6
[5]

- (Australia) S Huss
- (France) G Monfils
4
4

1
- (Canada) D Nestor
- (Serbia) N Zimonjić
6
6

- (United Kingdom) A Murray
- (United Kingdom) J Murray
6
6

5
- (United States) M Fish
- (The Bahamas) M Knowles
4
2

- (United States) S Lipsky
- (United States) S Querrey
2
4

- (United Kingdom) A Murray
- (United Kingdom) J Murray
3
3

5
- (United States) M Fish
- (The Bahamas) M Knowles
6
6

1
- (Canada) D Nestor
- (Serbia) N Zimonjić
3
4

- (Slovakia) K Beck
- (Czech Republic) D Škoch
6
6

4
- (Poland) M Fyrstenberg
- (Poland) M Matkowski
4
6
[5]

- (United Kingdom) R Hutchins
- (Australia) J Kerr
3
4

- (Slovakia) K Beck
- (Czech Republic) D Škoch
6
3
[10]

- (Slovakia) K Beck
- (Czech Republic) D Škoch
6
6

- (Slovakia) K Beck
- (Czech Republic) D Škoch
6
7^{7}

- (Germany) R Schüttler
- (Serbia) J Tipsarević
4
3

6
- (Sweden) R Lindstedt
- (Romania) H Tecău
3
6^{3}

- (Spain) M López
- (Spain) R Nadal
6
6

- (Spain) M López
- (Spain) R Nadal

6
- (Sweden) R Lindstedt
- (Romania) H Tecău
w/o

=== Bottom half ===
First round

Second round

Quarterfinals

Semifinals

8
- (France) J Benneteau
- (France) M Llodra
6
6

WC
- (United Kingdom) C Eaton
- (United Kingdom) D Inglot
2
0

- (Croatia) M Čilić
- (Brazil) A Sá
1
4

- (Croatia) M Čilić
- (Brazil) A Sá
6
6

8
- (France) J Benneteau
- (France) M Llodra
6
6

- (United States) E Butorac
- (United States) R Ram
4
7^{7}
[7]

- (Kazakhstan) A Golubev
- (Uzbekistan) D Istomin
4
1

- (Kazakhstan) A Golubev
- (Uzbekistan) D Istomin
6
6^{5}
[10]

- (Kazakhstan) A Golubev
- (Uzbekistan) D Istomin
7^{7}
6

3
- (Sweden) S Aspelin
- (Australia) P Hanley
6^{4}
1

8
- (France) J Benneteau
- (France) M Llodra
7^{9}
3
[6]

- (Serbia) N Djokovic
- (Israel) J Erlich
6^{7}
6
[10]

7
- (Brazil) M Melo
- (Brazil) B Soares
6^{3}
6
[3]

WC
- (United Kingdom) J Delgado
- (United Kingdom) J Marray
5
3

- (Serbia) N Djokovic
- (Israel) J Erlich
7^{7}
4
[10]

- (Serbia) N Djokovic
- (Israel) J Erlich
7
6

- (Serbia) N Djokovic
- (Israel) J Erlich
4
7^{8}
[10]

- (France) A Clément
- (France) N Mahut
6
6

2
- (South Africa) W Moodie
- (Belgium) D Norman
6
6^{6}
[3]

- (Spain) M Granollers
- (Spain) F López
3
4

- (France) A Clément
- (France) N Mahut
5
6^{3}

2
- (South Africa) W Moodie
- (Belgium) D Norman
7
7^{7}
