= 2011 ATP Studena Croatia Open =

- Date: 25–31 July
- Edition: 22nd
- Category: ATP World Tour 250 Series
- Draw: 28S/16D
- Prize money: €398,250
- Surface: Clay / outdoor
- Location: Umag, Croatia

Champions

Singles
- (Ukraine) Alexandr Dolgopolov

Doubles
- (Italy) Simone Bolelli / (Italy) Fabio Fognini
| ← 2010 · | Croatia Open | · 2012 → |

The 2011 ATP Studena Croatia Open was a men's tennis tournament played on outdoor clay courts. It was the 22nd edition of the ATP Studena Croatia Open, and was part of the ATP World Tour 250 Series of the 2011 ATP World Tour. It took place at the International Tennis Center in Umag, Croatia, from 26 July through 31 July 2011. Second-seeded Alexandr Dolgopolov won the singles title.

== Finals ==
=== Singles ===
(Ukraine) Alexandr Dolgopolov defeated (Croatia) Marin Čilić, 6–4, 3–6, 6–3

- It was Dolgopolov's 1st career title.

=== Doubles ===
(Italy) Simone Bolelli / (Italy) Fabio Fognini defeated (Croatia) Marin Čilić / (Croatia) Lovro Zovko, 6–3, 5–7, [10–7]

== ATP entrants ==
=== Seeds ===
| Country | Player | Ranking* | Seeding |
|---|---|---|---|
| ARG | Juan Ignacio Chela | 21 | 1 |
| UKR | Alexandr Dolgopolov | 27 | 2 |
| CRO | Ivan Ljubičić | 31 | 3 |
| CRO | Marin Čilić | 32 | 4 |
| ESP | Tommy Robredo | 36 | 5 |
| ITA | Fabio Fognini | 38 | 6 |
| ITA | Andreas Seppi | 39 | 7 |
| CRO | Ivan Dodig | 41 | 8 |

*Seedings based on the 18 July 2011 rankings.

=== Other entrants ===
The following players received wildcards into the singles main draw:

- (Croatia) Mate Delić
- (Croatia) Mate Pavić
- (Croatia) Antonio Veić

The following players received entry from the qualifying draw:

- (Serbia) Dušan Lajović
- (Italy) Gianluca Naso
- (Spain) Rubén Ramírez Hidalgo
- (Italy) Simone Vagnozzi
