= 2011 Aegon Championships – Singles =

Singles
- 2011 Aegon Championships

Final
- Champion: (United Kingdom) Andy Murray
- Runner-up: (France) Jo-Wilfried Tsonga
- Score: 3–6, 7–6^{(7–2)}, 6–4

Details
- Draw: 56
- Seeds: 16

Events
Singles	Doubles
- Queen's Club Championships

Sam Querrey was the defending champion but was eliminated by James Ward in the third round, ensuring that, for the sixth straight year, the defending champion would not be able to defend his title.

Andy Murray won in the final 3–6, 7–6^{(7–2)}, 6–4 against Jo-Wilfried Tsonga.

== Seeds ==
The top eight seeds receive a bye into the second round.

1. (Spain) Rafael Nadal (quarterfinals)
2. (United Kingdom) Andy Murray (champion)
3. (United States) Andy Roddick (semifinals)
4. (Switzerland) Stanislas Wawrinka (second round)
5. (France) Jo-Wilfried Tsonga (final)
6. (France) Gilles Simon (second round, retired due to back injury)
7. (Spain) Fernando Verdasco (quarterfinals)
8. (Croatia) Marin Čilić (quarterfinals, withdrew due to ankle injury)
9. (Argentina) David Nalbandian (third round)
10. (France) Michaël Llodra (third round, retired due to leg injury)
11. (Brazil) Thomaz Bellucci (third round)
12. (Argentina) Juan Martín del Potro (third round)
13. (United States) Sam Querrey (third round)
14. (Serbia) Janko Tipsarević (third round)
15. (South Africa) Kevin Anderson (third round)
16. (Croatia) Ivan Ljubičić (second round)

== Draw ==
Key

- Q = Qualifier
- WC = Wild card
- LL = Lucky loser
- Alt = Alternate
- ITF = ITF entry
- PR = Protected ranking
- SR = Special ranking
- SE = Special exempt
- JE = Junior exempt
- JR = Junior Accelerator Programme entrant
- CO = College Accelerator Programme entrant
- NG = Next Gen Accelerator Program entrant
- w/o = Walkover
- r = Retired
- d = Defaulted

=== Final ===
Quarterfinals
1	(Spain) Rafael Nadal	7^{7}	4	1
5	(France) Jo-Wilfried Tsonga	6^{3}	6	6
WC	(United Kingdom) James Ward	6	6^{14}	6
(France) Adrian Mannarino	2	7^{16}	4
7	(Spain) Fernando Verdasco	2	2
3	(United States) Andy Roddick	6	6
8	(Croatia) Marin Čilić
2	(United Kingdom) Andy Murray	w/o

Semifinals
5	(France) Jo-Wilfried Tsonga	6	7^{9}
WC	(United Kingdom) James Ward	3	6^{7}
3	(United States) Andy Roddick	3	1
2	(United Kingdom) Andy Murray	6	6

Final
5	(France) Jo-Wilfried Tsonga	6	6^{2}	4
2	(United Kingdom) Andy Murray	3	7^{7}	6

=== Top half ===
==== Section 1 ====
First round
Q	(Australia) M Ebden	7	6
(India) S Devvarman	5	3
(Czech Republic) R Štěpánek	6	6
(Japan) G Soeda	1	3
(United States) R Sweeting	6^{6}	2
16	(Croatia) I Ljubičić	7^{8}	6
10	(France) M Llodra	6	6
(Czech Republic) J Pospíšil	3	2
(France) J Benneteau	6^{6}	6	6
(Germany) D Brands	7^{8}	1	4
(Germany) M Berrer	7^{9}	2	7
WC	(United States) R Harrison	6^{7}	6	5

Second round
1	(Spain) R Nadal	6	6
Q	(Australia) M Ebden	4	4
(Czech Republic) R Štěpánek	0	7	6
16	(Croatia) I Ljubičić	6	5	4
10	(France) M Llodra	6	7
(France) J Benneteau	4	5
(Germany) M Berrer	0	1
5	(France) J-W Tsonga	6	6

Third round
1	(Spain) R Nadal	6	5	6
(Czech Republic) R Štěpánek	3	7	1
10	(France) M Llodra	3^{r}
5	(France) J-W Tsonga	4

Quarterfinals
1	(Spain) R Nadal	7^{7}	4	1
5	(France) J-W Tsonga	6^{3}	6	6

==== Section 2 ====
First round
WC	(United Kingdom) D Cox	3	1
WC	(United Kingdom) J Ward	6	6
(Germany) R Schüttler	6	6
Q	(United States) B Reynolds	1	1
(Japan) K Nishikori	3	4
13	(United States) S Querrey	6	6
12	(Argentina) JM del Potro	6	6
(Uzbekistan) D Istomin	4	2
(United States) A Bogomolov Jr.	4	6^{r}
(Russia) I Kunitsyn	6	6
(France) A Mannarino	6	6
(Latvia) E Gulbis	3	3

Second round
4	(Switzerland) S Wawrinka	6^{3}	3
WC	(United Kingdom) J Ward	7^{7}	6
(Germany) R Schüttler	6^{6}	7	3
13	(United States) S Querrey	7^{8}	5	6
12	(Argentina) JM del Potro	6	6
(Russia) I Kunitsyn	4	4
(France) A Mannarino	6^{4}	6	3
6	(France) G Simon	7^{7}	4	0^{r}

Third round
WC	(United Kingdom) J Ward	3	6	6
13	(United States) S Querrey	6	3	4
12	(Argentina) JM del Potro	6^{3}	6^{7}
(France) A Mannarino	7^{7}	7^{9}

Quarterfinals
WC	(United Kingdom) J Ward	6	6^{14}	6
(France) A Mannarino	2	7^{16}	4

=== Bottom half ===
==== Section 3 ====
First round
(France) N Mahut	6	6
WC	(United Kingdom) O Golding	3	4
(Kazakhstan) M Kukushkin	4	4
Q	(Serbia) I Bozoljac	6	6
(Ukraine) I Marchenko	3	4
9	(Argentina) D Nalbandian	6	6
15	(South Africa) K Anderson	6	7^{7}
(Croatia) I Karlović	4	6^{2}
(Austria) A Haider-Maurer	4	7^{7}	2
(United States) D Young	6	6^{5}	6
(Spain) F López	7^{7}	6
(Russia) D Tursunov	6^{4}	3

Second round
7	(Spain) F Verdasco	6	6
(France) N Mahut	2	3
Q	(Serbia) I Bozoljac	4	4
9	(Argentina) D Nalbandian	6	6
15	(South Africa) K Anderson	6	6
(United States) D Young	2	4
(Spain) F López	6^{2}	7^{7}	4
3	(United States) A Roddick	7^{7}	6^{5}	6

Third round
7	(Spain) F Verdasco	7	6
9	(Argentina) D Nalbandian	5	1
15	(South Africa) K Anderson	4	4
3	(United States) A Roddick	6	6

Quarterfinals
7	(Spain) F Verdasco	2	2
3	(United States) A Roddick	6	6

==== Section 4 ====
First round
Q	(France) A Clément	7	6
(France) B Paire	5	3
(Turkey) M İlhan	6	6
(Czech Republic) J Hájek	4	4
(Bulgaria) G Dimitrov	6	6^{8}	2
11	(Brazil) T Bellucci	3	7^{10}	6
14	(Serbia) J Tipsarević	6	6
(Slovenia) B Kavčič	4	4
(Germany) D Gremelmayr	3	5
(United States) M Russell	6	7
(Belgium) X Malisse	6	6
(Germany) M Bachinger	4	4

Second round
8	(Croatia) M Čilić	6	6
Q	(France) A Clément	4	4
(Turkey) M İlhan	2	7^{7}	6^{5}
11	(Brazil) T Bellucci	6	6^{3}	7^{7}
14	(Serbia) J Tipsarević	7^{7}	7^{7}
(United States) M Russell	6^{3}	6^{5}
(Belgium) X Malisse	3	7	3
2	(United Kingdom) A Murray	6	5	6

Third round
8	(Croatia) M Čilić	7^{7}	0	6
11	(Brazil) T Bellucci	6^{3}	6	3
14	(Serbia) J Tipsarević	4	6^{3}
2	(United Kingdom) A Murray	6	7^{7}

Quarterfinals
8	(Croatia) M Čilić
2	(United Kingdom) A Murray	w/o
