= 2012 ATP Vegeta Croatia Open Umag =

- Date: 9–17 July
- Edition: 23rd
- Category: ATP World Tour 250
- Surface: Clay / outdoor
- Location: Umag, Croatia
- Venue: International Tennis Center

Champions

Singles
- (Croatia) Marin Čilić

Doubles
- (Spain) David Marrero / (Spain) Fernando Verdasco
- Croatia Open

The 2012 ATP Vegeta Croatia Open Umag was a men's tennis tournament played on outdoor clay courts. It was the 23rd edition of the ATP Vegeta Croatia Open Umag, and was part of the ATP World Tour 250 Series of the 2012 ATP World Tour. It took place at the International Tennis Center in Umag, Croatia, from 9 July until 15 July 2012. Second-seeded Marin Čilić won the singles title.

== Finals ==
=== Singles ===
(Croatia) Marin Čilić defeated (Spain) Marcel Granollers, 6–4, 6–2

- It was Čilić' 2nd and last singles title of the year and the 8th of his career.

=== Doubles ===
(Spain) David Marrero / (Spain) Fernando Verdasco defeated (Spain) Marcel Granollers / (Spain) Marc López 6–3, 7–6^{(7–4)}

== Singles main-draw entrants ==
=== Seeds ===
Country	Player	Rank^{1}	Seed
ESP	Fernando Verdasco	16	1
CRO	Marin Čilić	18	2
UKR	Alexandr Dolgopolov	21	3
ESP	Marcel Granollers	23	4
ARG	Carlos Berlocq	37	5
ESP	Juan Carlos Ferrero	38	6
SVK	Martin Kližan	62	7
FRA	Édouard Roger-Vasselin	67	8

- ^{1} Seedings based on rankings as of 25 June 2012

=== Other entrants ===
The following players received wildcards into the singles main draw:

- (Slovenia) Aljaž Bedene
- (Russia) Andrey Kuznetsov
- (Croatia) Mate Pavić

The following players received entry from the qualifying draw:

- (Spain) Gorka Fraile
- (Slovakia) Ivo Klec
- (Argentina) Marco Trungelliti
- (Italy) Walter Trusendi

=== Withdrawals ===
- (Croatia) Ivo Karlović → replaced by (Portugal) João Sousa
- (Portugal) Rui Machado → replaced by (Croatia) Antonio Veić

== Doubles main-draw entrants ==
=== Seeds ===
Country	Player	Country	Player	Rank^{1}	Seed
ESP	Marcel Granollers	ESP	Marc López	35	1
ITA	Daniele Bracciali	ITA	Fabio Fognini	65	2
ESP	David Marrero	ESP	Fernando Verdasco	89	3
~~GER~~	~~Frank Moser~~	~~FRA~~	~~Édouard Roger-Vasselin~~	~~127~~	~~4~~

- Rankings are as of 25 June 2012

=== Other entrants ===
The following pairs received wildcards into the doubles main draw:

- (Croatia) Toni Androić / (Croatia) Marin Draganja
- (Croatia) Franko Škugor / (Croatia) Antonio Veić

The following pairs received entry as alternates:

- (Serbia) Nikola Ćaćić / (Serbia) Dušan Lajović
- (Poland) Mateusz Kowalczyk / (Czech Republic) David Škoch

=== Withdrawals ===
- (France) Édouard Roger-Vasselin
