= 2011 ATP Studena Croatia Open – Singles =

Singles
- 2011 ATP Studena Croatia Open

Final
- Champion: (Ukraine) Alexandr Dolgopolov
- Runner-up: (Croatia) Marin Čilić
- Score: 6–4, 3–6, 6–3

Details
- Draw: 28 (4 Q / 3 WC )
- Seeds: 8

Events
Singles	Doubles
- Croatia Open

Alexandr Dolgopolov won the title, defeating Marin Čilić in the final, 6–4, 3–6, 6–3.

Juan Carlos Ferrero was the defending champion, but lost fo Dolgopolov in the semifinals.

== Seeds ==
The first four seeds received a bye into the second round.

1. (Argentina) Juan Ignacio Chela (second round)
2. (Ukraine) Alexandr Dolgopolov (champion)
3. (Croatia) Ivan Ljubičić (second round)
4. (Croatia) Marin Čilić (final)
5. (Spain) Tommy Robredo (second round, withdrew due to left calf injury)
6. (Italy) Fabio Fognini (semifinals)
7. (Italy) Andreas Seppi (quarterfinals)
8. (Croatia) Ivan Dodig (first round)

== Draw ==
Key

- Q = Qualifier
- WC = Wild card
- LL = Lucky loser
- Alt = Alternate
- ITF = ITF entry
- PR = Protected ranking
- SR = Special ranking
- SE = Special exempt
- JE = Junior exempt
- JR = Junior Accelerator Programme entrant
- CO = College Accelerator Programme entrant
- NG = Next Gen Accelerator Program entrant
- w/o = Walkover
- r = Retired
- d = Defaulted

=== Finals ===
Semifinals
6	(Italy) Fabio Fognini	2	2
4	(Croatia) Marin Čilić	6	6
(Spain) Juan Carlos Ferrero	4	4
2	(Ukraine) Alexandr Dolgopolov	6	6

Final
4	(Croatia) Marin Čilić	4	6	3
2	(Ukraine) Alexandr Dolgopolov	6	3	6

=== Top half ===
First round
(Italy) P Starace	6^{5}	6	6
(Netherlands) T de Bakker	7^{7}	2	1
(Ukraine) S Stakhovsky	4	4
(Belgium) O Rochus	6	6
(Portugal) R Machado	4	3
6	(Italy) F Fognini	6	6
Q	(Italy) S Vagnozzi	6	3	1
(Netherlands) R Haase	3	6	6
WC	(Croatia) A Veić	4	5
(Argentina) D Junqueira	6	7
Q	(Serbia) D Lajović	4	2
7	(Italy) A Seppi	6	6

Second round
1	(Argentina) JI Chela	4	6	5
(Italy) P Starace	6	4	7
(Belgium) O Rochus	4	1
6	(Italy) F Fognini	6	6
4	(Croatia) M Čilić	4	6	6
(Netherlands) R Haase	6	4	3
(Argentina) D Junqueira	5	1
7	(Italy) A Seppi	7	6

Quarterfinals
(Italy) P Starace	6	3	1
6	(Italy) F Fognini	3	6	6
4	(Croatia) M Čilić	6	6
7	(Italy) A Seppi	1	3

Semifinals
6	(Italy) F Fognini	2	2
4	(Croatia) M Čilić	6	6

=== Bottom half ===
First round
5	(Spain) T Robredo	6	6
Q	(Spain) R Ramírez Hidalgo	3	2
(Slovenia) B Kavčič	4	7^{9}	4
(Argentina) C Berlocq	6	6^{7}	6
(Spain) JC Ferrero	3	6	1
(Argentina) M González	6	3	1^{r}
8	(Croatia) I Dodig	4	6	2
(Spain) A Ramos	6	3	6
Q	(Italy) G Naso	6	6
WC	(Croatia) M Delić	4	2
WC	(Croatia) M Pavić	4	0
(Italy) F Volandri	6	6

Second round
5	(Spain) T Robredo
(Argentina) C Berlocq	w/o
(Spain) JC Ferrero	1	6	6
3	(Croatia) I Ljubičić	6	3	4
(Spain) A Ramos	6	6
Q	(Italy) G Naso	1	3
(Italy) F Volandri	1	2
2	(Ukraine) A Dolgopolov	6	6

Quarterfinals
(Argentina) C Berlocq	1	6^{5}
(Spain) JC Ferrero	6	7^{7}
(Spain) A Ramos	3	5
2	(Ukraine) A Dolgopolov	6	7

Semifinals
(Spain) JC Ferrero	4	4
2	(Ukraine) A Dolgopolov	6	6
