= Gorka Fraile =

Spanish tennis player (born 1978)

- Full name: Gorka Fraile
- Country (sports): Spain
- Born: 7 April 1978 (age 47); Irun, Spain
- Prize money: $243,795

Singles
- Career record: 1–8
- Career titles: 0
- Highest ranking: No. 126 (23 October 2006)

Doubles
- Career record: 2–3
- Career titles: 0
- Highest ranking: No. 233 (9 May 2005)

Gorka Fraile (born 7 April 1978) is a former professional tennis player from Spain.

== Biography ==
Fraile comes from Irun, in the Basque region of Spain. He was six when he started playing tennis and until the age of 14 trained at the Club de Tenis Txingudy. After a year in Madrid, he moved to Barcelona where he has lived since.

A regular competitor on the Challenger Tour, Fraile won a total of two singles titles. The first came at Freudenstadt in 2003 when he defeated Alexander Waske in the final and the second at Genoa in 2006, with a win over Potito Starace. He also had notable wins during his run to the final of the Kyiv Challenger in 2002, defeating Nikolay Davydenko in the quarter-finals, then Fernando Verdasco in the semi-finals. In 2007 he beat former world number one Gustavo Kuerten at a Challenger in the Brazilian's home city Florianópolis.

He made occasional main draw appearances at ATP Tour level tournaments, the first at the 2002 Swedish Open, where he upset defending champion Andrea Gaudenzi in the first round. After featuring at the Swedish Open again in 2005, Fraile played in the main draw of three tournaments in 2006, Buenos Aires, Valencia and the Madrid Masters. He played at Vina del Mar in 2007 and retired soon after, but made a brief comeback to the ATP Tour when he managed to qualify for the 2012 Croatia Open Umag.

== Challenger titles ==
=== Singles: (2) ===
No.	Year	Tournament	Surface	Opponent	Score
1.	2003	Freudenstadt, Germany	Clay	(Germany) Alexander Waske	3–6, 6–3, 6–4
2.	2006	Genoa, Italy	Clay	(Italy) Potito Starace	6–4, 3–6, 6–4
