= Andraž Bedene =

Slovenian tennis player

- Country (sports): Slovenia
- Born: 18 July 1989 (age 35); Ljubljana, Slovenia
- Plays: Right-handed (two-handed backhand)
- Prize money: $14,085

Singles
- Career record: 0–0 (at ATP Tour level, Grand Slam level, and in Davis Cup)
- Career titles: 0
- Highest ranking: No. 840 (5 December 2011)

Doubles
- Career record: 0–1 (at ATP Tour level, Grand Slam level, and in Davis Cup)
- Career titles: 1 ITF
- Highest ranking: No. 818 (31 August 2009)
- Current ranking: No. 1142 (20 February 2017)
- Last updated on: 20 February 2017.

Andraž Bedene (born 18 July 1989) is a Slovenian tennis player.

Bedene has a career high ATP singles ranking of 840 achieved on 5 December 2011. He also has a career high ATP doubles ranking of 818 achieved on 31 August 2009.

Bedene made his ATP main draw debut at the 2011 ATP Studena Croatia Open in the doubles draw partnering his twin brother Aljaž Bedene.
