= 2013 Aegon Championships – Singles =

Singles
- 2013 Aegon Championships

Final
- Champion: (United Kingdom) Andy Murray
- Runner-up: (Croatia) Marin Čilić
- Score: 5–7, 7–5, 6–3

Details
- Draw: 56
- Seeds: 16

Events
Singles	Doubles
- Queen's Club Championships

Marin Čilić was the defending champion, but was defeated 7–5, 5–7, 3–6 in the final by Andy Murray. Winning in the final meant Murray became the first British player to win three titles at the Queen's Club since Arthur Lowe in the 1920s.

== Seeds ==
The top eight seeds receive a bye into the second round.

1. (United Kingdom) Andy Murray (champion)
2. (Czech Republic) Tomáš Berdych (quarterfinals)
3. (Argentina) Juan Martín del Potro (quarterfinals)
4. (France) Jo-Wilfried Tsonga (semifinals)
5. (Croatia) Marin Čilić (final)
6. (United States) Sam Querrey (third round)
7. (Ukraine) Alexandr Dolgopolov (third round)
8. (South Africa) Kevin Anderson (withdrew because of a shoulder injury)
9. (France) Benoît Paire (second round)
10. (Bulgaria) Grigor Dimitrov (second round)
11. (France) Julien Benneteau (second round)
12. (Czech Republic) Lukáš Rosol (second round)
13. (Finland) Jarkko Nieminen (second round)
14. (Uzbekistan) Denis Istomin (second round)
15. (Spain) Pablo Andújar (first round)
16. (Slovenia) Grega Žemlja (third round)

== Draw ==
Key

- Q = Qualifier
- WC = Wild card
- LL = Lucky loser
- Alt = Alternate
- ITF = ITF entry
- PR = Protected ranking
- SR = Special ranking
- SE = Special exempt
- JE = Junior exempt
- JR = Junior Accelerator Programme entrant
- CO = College Accelerator Programme entrant
- NG = Next Gen Accelerator Program entrant
- w/o = Walkover
- r = Retired
- d = Defaulted

=== Finals ===
Quarterfinals
1	(United Kingdom) Andy Murray	6	7^{7}
(Germany) Benjamin Becker	4	6^{3}
4	(France) Jo-Wilfried Tsonga	6	6
(United States) Denis Kudla	3	2
(Australia) Lleyton Hewitt	6	2	6
3	(Argentina) Juan Martín del Potro	2	6	2
5	(Croatia) Marin Čilić	7	7^{7}
2	(Czech Republic) Tomáš Berdych	5	6^{4}

Semifinals
1	(United Kingdom) Andy Murray	4	6	6
4	(France) Jo-Wilfried Tsonga	6	3	2
(Australia) Lleyton Hewitt	4	6	2
5	(Croatia) Marin Čilić	6	4	6

Final
1	(United Kingdom) Andy Murray	5	7	6
5	(Croatia) Marin Čilić	7	5	3

=== Top half ===
==== Section 1 ====
First round
(France) N Mahut	6	6
(United States) R Williams	3	2
LL	(Denmark) F Nielsen	5	2
(Australia) M Matosevic	7	6
(France) M Llodra	6	6
15	(Spain) P Andújar	3	1
12	(Czech Republic) L Rosol	6^{7}	6	6
Q	(Australia) S Groth	7^{9}	3	2
(Germany) B Becker	6	6^{4}	7^{7}
(Australia) B Tomic	4	7^{7}	6^{4}
(Colombia) S Giraldo	6	6
(Canada) J Levine	4	4

Second round
1	(United Kingdom) A Murray	6	7^{7}
(France) N Mahut	3	6^{4}
(Australia) M Matosevic	w/o
(France) M Llodra
12	(Czech Republic) L Rosol	6^{2}	5
(Germany) B Becker	7^{7}	7
(Colombia) S Giraldo	3	6	4
7/WC	(Ukraine) A Dolgopolov	6	4	6

Third round
1	(United Kingdom) A Murray	6	6
(Australia) M Matosevic	2	2
(Germany) B Becker	7^{7}	7
7/WC	(Ukraine) A Dolgopolov	6^{5}	5

Quarterfinals
1	(United Kingdom) A Murray	6	7^{7}
(Germany) B Becker	4	6^{3}

==== Section 2 ====
First round
(France) G Rufin	7^{7}	5	6^{5}
(France) É Roger-Vasselin	6^{1}	7	7^{7}
(Japan) T Ito	3	5
(Netherlands) I Sijsling	6	7
(Russia) A Kuznetsov	6^{2}	6^{3}
14	(Uzbekistan) D Istomin	7^{7}	7^{7}
9	(France) B Paire	7	6
Q	(United Kingdom) J Baker	5	2
(Argentina) F Delbonis	0	3
(United States) D Kudla	6	6
(France) K de Schepper	6^{5}	6	6
(United States) R Ram	7^{7}	2	4

Second round
4	(France) J-W Tsonga	6	6^{2}	6
(France) É Roger-Vasselin	3	7^{7}	3
(Netherlands) I Sijsling	7^{7}	6
14	(Uzbekistan) D Istomin	6^{4}	1
9	(France) B Paire	3	4
(United States) D Kudla	6	6
(France) K de Schepper	6	6
LL	(India) R Bopanna	4	3

Third round
4	(France) J-W Tsonga	7	5	6
(Netherlands) I Sijsling	5	7	3
(United States) D Kudla	6	6
(France) K de Schepper	1	3

Quarterfinals
4	(France) J-W Tsonga	6	6
(United States) D Kudla	3	2

=== Bottom half ===
==== Section 3 ====
First round
(Slovenia) A Bedene	7^{7}	6
(France) P-H Mathieu	6^{5}	3
(Australia) L Hewitt	4	6	6
(United States) M Russell	6	1	3
(Israel) D Sela	6	2	6^{4}
10	(Bulgaria) G Dimitrov	4	6	7^{7}
13	(Finland) J Nieminen	6	6
(United States) R Harrison	3	3
(Argentina) G Pella	3	1
WC	(United Kingdom) D Evans	6	6
(Spain) G García López	4	7	4
(Belgium) X Malisse	6	5	6

Second round
6	(United States) S Querrey	7^{13}	5	7^{7}
(Slovenia) A Bedene	6^{11}	7	6^{5}
(Australia) L Hewitt	6	6
10	(Bulgaria) G Dimitrov	4	3
13	(Finland) J Nieminen	4	7^{8}	4
WC	(United Kingdom) D Evans	6	6^{6}	6
(Belgium) X Malisse	6^{5}	6	5
3	(Argentina) JM del Potro	7^{7}	1	7

Third round
6	(United States) S Querrey	7	3	4
(Australia) L Hewitt	5	6	6
WC	(United Kingdom) D Evans	0	3
3	(Argentina) JM del Potro	6	6

Quarterfinals
(Australia) L Hewitt	6	2	6
3	(Argentina) JM del Potro	2	6	2

==== Section 4 ====
First round
(Croatia) I Dodig	6^{8}	7^{7}	7^{7}
WC	(United Kingdom) J Ward	7^{10}	6^{2}	6^{2}
Q	(Spain) F López	3	6	6
(Lithuania) R Berankis	6	3	4
(France) A Mannarino	6^{7}	3
11	(France) J Benneteau	7^{9}	6
16	(Slovenia) G Žemlja	6	7^{7}
WC	(United Kingdom) K Edmund	4	6^{4}
WC	(United Kingdom) E Corrie	4	6^{1}
(Ukraine) S Stakhovsky	6	7^{7}
(Netherlands) T de Bakker	6	7^{7}
Q	(Serbia) I Bozoljac	2	6^{5}

Second round
5	(Croatia) M Čilić	6	6
(Croatia) I Dodig	3	4
Q	(Spain) F López	7^{7}	6
11	(France) J Benneteau	6^{5}	4
16	(Slovenia) G Žemlja	7	6
(Ukraine) S Stakhovsky	5	4
(Netherlands) T de Bakker	1	4
2	(Czech Republic) T Berdych	6	6

Third round
5	(Croatia) M Čilić	4	7^{7}	7
Q	(Spain) F López	6	6^{5}	5
16	(Slovenia) G Žemlja	3	4
2	(Czech Republic) T Berdych	6	6

Quarterfinals
5	(Croatia) M Čilić	7	7^{7}
2	(Czech Republic) T Berdych	5	6^{4}

== Qualifying ==
=== Seeds ===
The top six seeds received a bye into the second round.

1. (Spain) Feliciano López (qualified)
2. (Australia) James Duckworth (second round)
3. (Australia) Matthew Barton (second round)
4. (Australia) Matt Reid (second round)
5. (Australia) Samuel Groth (qualified)
6. (Israel) Amir Weintraub (second round)
7. (Australia) John-Patrick Smith (second round)
8. (Republic of Ireland) James McGee (second round)

=== Qualifiers ===
1. (Spain) Feliciano López
2. (United Kingdom) Jamie Baker
3. (Australia) Samuel Groth
4. (Serbia) Ilija Bozoljac

=== Lucky losers ===
1. (Denmark) Frederik Nielsen
2. (India) Rohan Bopanna

=== Qualifying draw ===
==== First qualifier ====
First round
(United Kingdom) Miles Bugby	3	6	3
(Germany) Frank Moser	6	4	6
(Denmark) Frederik Nielsen	6	6
(France) Fabrice Martin	4	1
(Poland) Piotr Gadomski	1	7	1
8	(Republic of Ireland) James McGee	6	5	6

Second round
1	(Spain) Feliciano López	6	7
(Germany) Frank Moser	2	5
(Denmark) Frederik Nielsen	6	4	6
8	(Republic of Ireland) James McGee	4	6	1

Qualifying competition
1	(Spain) Feliciano López	4	6	6
(Denmark) Frederik Nielsen	6	3	4

==== Second qualifier ====
First round				Second round				Qualifying competition
				2	(Australia) James Duckworth	6^{5}	4
(India) Prakash Amritraj	3	4			(United Kingdom) Jamie Baker	7^{7}	6
(United Kingdom) Jamie Baker	6	6						(United Kingdom) Jamie Baker	6	6
(Brazil) Marcelo Melo	2	6	7^{7}					(Brazil) Marcelo Melo	2	2
(United Kingdom) Alex Bogdanovic	6	3	6^{5}		(Brazil) Marcelo Melo	6	6
				6	(Israel) Amir Weintraub	3	2

==== Third qualifier ====
First round			Second round					Qualifying competition
			3	(Australia) Matthew Barton	2	6^{3}
(Serbia) Nenad Zimonjić	6	6		(Serbia) Nenad Zimonjić	6	7^{7}
(United Kingdom) Adam Thornton-Brown	1	3							(Serbia) Nenad Zimonjić	3	4
(United Kingdom) Josh Goodall	7^{7}	7						5	(Australia) Samuel Groth	6	6
(United Kingdom) Stefan Sterland-Markovic	6^{5}	5		(United Kingdom) Josh Goodall	7^{9}	4	2
			5	(Australia) Samuel Groth	6^{7}	6	6

==== Fourth qualifier ====
First round
(Serbia) Ilija Bozoljac	6	6
(United Kingdom) Cameron Norrie	4	3
(India) Rohan Bopanna	7	6
(United Kingdom) Robert Carter	5	0
(United Kingdom) James Ireland	2	6^{9}
7	(Australia) John-Patrick Smith	6	7^{11}

Second round
4	(Australia) Matt Reid	5	4
(Serbia) Ilija Bozoljac	7	6
(India) Rohan Bopanna	6	7
7	(Australia) John-Patrick Smith	3	5

Qualifying competition
(Serbia) Ilija Bozoljac	6	6
(India) Rohan Bopanna	1	1
