= 2012 Aegon Championships =

2012 Queen's Club Championships
- Date: 11–17 June
- Edition: 110th
- Category: World Tour 250
- Draw: 56S / 24D
- Prize money: €625,300
- Surface: Grass
- Location: London, United Kingdom
- Venue: Queen's Club

Champions

Singles
- (Croatia) Marin Čilić

Doubles
- (Belarus) Max Mirnyi / (Canada) Daniel Nestor
- Queen's Club Championships

The 2012 Aegon Championships (also known traditionally as the Queen's Club Championships) was a men's tennis tournament played on outdoor grass courts. It was the 110th edition of the Queen's Club Championships and was part of the ATP World Tour 250 series of the 2012 ATP World Tour. It took place at the Queen's Club in London, United Kingdom, in the club's 126th year between 11 and 17 June.

Marin Čilić won the tournament after his opponent in the final, David Nalbandian was disqualified for kicking a lines official.

== Finals ==
=== Singles ===
- (Croatia) Marin Čilić defeated (Argentina) David Nalbandian 6–7^{(3–7)}, 4–3 def.

=== Doubles ===
- (Belarus) Max Mirnyi / (Canada) Daniel Nestor defeated (United States) Bob Bryan / (United States) Mike Bryan, 6–3, 6–4

== Singles main draw entrants ==
=== Seeds ===
Country	Player	Rank^{1}	Seed
GBR	Andy Murray	4	1
FRA	Jo-Wilfried Tsonga	5	2
SRB	Janko Tipsarević	8	3
FRA	Gilles Simon	12	4
ESP	Feliciano López	17	5
CRO	Marin Čilić	24	6
USA	Andy Roddick	30	7
FRA	Julien Benneteau	32	8
RSA	Kevin Anderson	34	9
ARG	David Nalbandian	40	10
CYP	Marcos Baghdatis	42	11
UZB	Denis Istomin	43	12
RUS	Alex Bogomolov, Jr.	46	13
LUX	Gilles Müller	54	14
JPN	Go Soeda	58	15
CRO	Ivo Karlović	59	16

- ^{1} Seedings are based on the rankings of May 28, 2012

=== Other entrants ===
The following players received wildcards into the singles main draw:

- (United Kingdom) Jamie Baker
- (United Kingdom) Liam Broady
- (United Kingdom) Oliver Golding
- (Australia) Lleyton Hewitt
- (United Kingdom) James Ward

The following players received entry from the qualifying draw:

- (Belgium) Ruben Bemelmans
- (France) Kenny de Schepper
- (Kazakhstan) Evgeny Korolev
- (United States) Bobby Reynolds

The following player received a Lucky Loser spot:

- (United States) Ryan Sweeting

=== Withdrawals ===
- (Argentina) Juan Martín del Potro
- (Colombia) Alejandro Falla
- (United States) Mardy Fish
- (France) Richard Gasquet
- (Argentina) Leonardo Mayer
- (Switzerland) Stanislas Wawrinka

== Doubles main draw entrants ==
=== Seeds ===
Country	Player	Country	Player	Rank^{1}	Seed
BLR	Max Mirnyi	CAN	Daniel Nestor	2	1
USA	Bob Bryan	USA	Mike Bryan	6	2
POL	Mariusz Fyrstenberg	POL	Radek Štěpánek	16	3
SWE	Robert Lindstedt	ROU	Horia Tecău	21	4
IND	Mahesh Bhupathi	IND	Rohan Bopanna	25	5
GBR	Colin Fleming	GBR	Ross Hutchins	55	6
SRB	Janko Tipsarević	SRB	Nenad Zimonjić	56	7
USA	Eric Butorac	AUS	Paul Hanley	72	8

- Rankings are as of May 28, 2012

=== Other entrants ===
The following pairs received wildcards into the doubles main draw:

- (United Kingdom) Jamie Delgado / (United Kingdom) Ken Skupski
- (Australia) Lleyton Hewitt / (United States) Andy Roddick

The following pair received entry as alternates:

- (Belgium) Steve Darcis / (Belgium) Olivier Rochus

=== Withdrawals ===
- (Argentina) Leonardo Mayer (family emergency)
