= 2002 Croatia Open – Doubles =

Doubles
- 2002 Croatia Open
- 2001 Champions: (Argentina) Sergio Roitman (Argentina) Andrés Schneiter

Final
- Champions: (Czech Republic) František Čermák (Austria) Julian Knowle
- Runners-up: (Spain) Albert Portas (Spain) Fernando Vicente
- Score: 6–4, 6–4

Details
- Draw: 16
- Seeds: 4

Events
Singles	Doubles
← 2001 ·	Croatia Open	· 2003 →

Sergio Roitman and Andrés Schneiter were the defending champions but lost in the first round to Todd Perry and Paul Rosner.

František Čermák and Julian Knowle won in the final 6–4, 6–4 against Albert Portas and Fernando Vicente.

== Seeds ==
Champion seeds are indicated in bold text while text in italics indicates the round in which those seeds were eliminated.

1. (Czech Republic) Tomáš Cibulec / (Czech Republic) Daniel Vacek (quarterfinals)
2. (Australia) Paul Hanley / (Australia) Michael Hill (first round)
3. (Czech Republic) Petr Pála / (Czech Republic) Pavel Vízner (semifinals)
4. (Sweden) Simon Aspelin / (Argentina) Martín García (first round)

== Draw ==
=== Key ===
- Q = Qualifier
- WC = Wild card
- LL = Lucky loser
- Alt = Alternate
- ITF = ITF entry
- PR = Protected ranking
- SR = Special ranking
- SE = Special exempt
- JE = Junior exempt
- JR = Junior Accelerator Programme entrant
- CO = College Accelerator Programme entrant
- NG = Next Gen Accelerator Program entrant
- w/o = Walkover
- r = Retired
- d = Defaulted

First round
1	(Czech Republic) **T Cibulec** (Czech Republic) **D Vacek**	**6**	**6**
(Argentina) L Lobo (Argentina) E Massa	3	2
(Spain) **A Portas** (Spain) **F Vicente**	**6**	**6**
WC	(Argentina) M Puerta (Croatia) L Zovko	4	4
4	(Sweden) S Aspelin (Argentina) M García	4	6^{4}
(Czech Republic) **J Levinský** (Czech Republic) **D Škoch**	**6**	**7^{7}**
(Australia) **T Perry** (South Africa) **P Rosner**	**7^{7}**	**6**
(Argentina) S Roitman (Argentina) A Schneiter	6^{3}	4
(Argentina) **A Calleri** (Spain) **F López**	**6**	**6**
WC	(Croatia) M Radić (Slovenia) N Smole	4	2
(Italy) M Bertolini (Italy) C Brandi	3	2
3	(Czech Republic) **P Pála** (Czech Republic) **P Vízner**	**6**	**6**
WC	(Spain) M Marco Ripoll (Spain) C Moyá	**6**	1	1
(United States) **J Thomas** (Belgium) **T Vanhoudt**	4	**6**	**6**
(Czech Republic) **F Čermák** (Austria) **J Knowle**	**6**	**6**
2	(Australia) P Hanley (Australia) M Hill	3	4

Quarterfinals
1	(Czech Republic) T Cibulec (Czech Republic) D Vacek	2	**6**	6^{1}
(Spain) **A Portas** (Spain) **F Vicente**	**6**	4	**7^{7}**
(Czech Republic) **J Levinský** (Czech Republic) **D Škoch**	**6**	**6**
(Australia) T Perry (South Africa) P Rosner	2	4
(Argentina) A Calleri (Spain) F López	0	4
3	(Czech Republic) **P Pála** (Czech Republic) **P Vízner**	**6**	**6**
(United States) J Thomas (Belgium) T Vanhoudt	2	**6**	4
(Czech Republic) **F Čermák** (Austria) **J Knowle**	**6**	2	**6**

Semifinals
(Spain) **A Portas** (Spain) **F Vicente**	3	**7^{7}**	**6**
(Czech Republic) J Levinský (Czech Republic) D Škoch	**6**	6^{2}	4
3	(Czech Republic) P Pála (Czech Republic) P Vízner	6^{5}	**7^{7}**	3
(Czech Republic) **F Čermák** (Austria) **J Knowle**	**7^{7}**	6^{5}	**6**

Final
(Spain) Albert Portas (Spain) Fernando Vicente	4	4
(Czech Republic) **František Čermák** (Austria) **Julian Knowle**	**6**	**6**
