= 2003 Croatia Open – Doubles =

Doubles
- 2003 Croatia Open
- 2002 Champions: (Czech Republic) František Čermák (Austria) Julian Knowle

Final
- Champions: (Spain) Álex López Morón (Spain) Rafael Nadal
- Runners-up: (Australia) Todd Perry (Japan) Thomas Shimada
- Score: 6–1, 6–3

Details
- Draw: 16
- Seeds: 4

Events
Singles	Doubles
← 2002 ·	Croatia Open	· 2004 →

Álex López Morón and Rafael Nadal defeated Todd Perry and Thomas Shimada in the final, 6–1, 6–3.

František Čermák and Julian Knowle were the defending champions, but only Knowle competed that year partnering Lovro Zovko. They lost in the quarterfinals to López Morón and Nadal.

== Seeds ==
Champion seeds are indicated in bold text while text in italics indicates the round in which those seeds were eliminated.

1. (Italy) Massimo Bertolini / (Belgium) Tom Vanhoudt (semifinals)
2. (Czech Republic) Jaroslav Levinský / (Czech Republic) David Škoch (semifinals)
3. (Austria) Julian Knowle / (Croatia) Lovro Zovko (quarterfinals)
4. (Australia) Todd Perry / (Japan) Thomas Shimada (final)

== Draw ==
=== Key ===
- Q = Qualifier
- WC = Wild card
- LL = Lucky loser
- Alt = Alternate
- ITF = ITF entry
- PR = Protected ranking
- SR = Special ranking
- SE = Special exempt
- JE = Junior exempt
- JR = Junior Accelerator Programme entrant
- CO = College Accelerator Programme entrant
- NG = Next Gen Accelerator Program entrant
- w/o = Walkover
- r = Retired
- d = Defaulted

First round
1	(Italy) **M Bertolini** (Belgium) **T Vanhoudt**	**6**	**6**
(Croatia) I Karlović (North Macedonia) A Kitinov	4	3
(Spain) **D Ferrer** (Spain) **F Vicente**	**6**	**6**
WC	(Spain) M Marco Ripoll (Spain) C Moyá	4	4
4	(Australia) **T Perry** (Japan) **T Shimada**	**6**	**7^{8}**
ALT	(Slovakia) M Mertiňák (Slovakia) L Svarc	3	6^{6}
(Belgium) **C Rochus** (Belgium) **O Rochus**	**6**	3	**6**
ALT	(Croatia) R Karanušić (Croatia) M Radić	4	**6**	3
(Spain) **Á López Morón** (Spain) **R Nadal**	**6**	**6**
(Slovakia) D Hrbatý (Spain) A Martín	4	3
WC	(Slovenia) N Smole (Slovenia) M Tkalec	1	3
3	(Austria) **J Knowle** (Croatia) **L Zovko**	**6**	**6**
(Spain) **J I Carrasco** (Spain) **R Ramírez Hidalgo**	**6**	**7**
(Argentina) M Puerta (Argentina) A Schneiter	2	5
(Italy) E Artoni (Argentina) F Browne	4	5
2	(Czech Republic) **J Levinský** (Czech Republic) **D Škoch**	**6**	**7**

Quarterfinals
1	(Italy) **M Bertolini** (Belgium) **T Vanhoudt**	**w/o**
(Spain) D Ferrer (Spain) F Vicente
4	(Australia) **T Perry** (Japan) **T Shimada**	**6**	**6**
(Belgium) C Rochus (Belgium) O Rochus	4	4
(Spain) **Á López Morón** (Spain) **R Nadal**	**6**	**6**
3	(Austria) J Knowle (Croatia) L Zovko	3	4
(Spain) J I Carrasco (Spain) R Ramírez Hidalgo	**6**	4	3
2	(Czech Republic) **J Levinský** (Czech Republic) **D Škoch**	3	**6**	**6**

Semifinals
1	(Italy) M Bertolini (Belgium) T Vanhoudt	**6**	3	4
4	(Australia) **T Perry** (Japan) **T Shimada**	2	**6**	**6**
(Spain) **Á López Morón** (Spain) **R Nadal**	3	**6**	**6**
2	(Czech Republic) J Levinský (Czech Republic) D Škoch	**6**	4	2

Final
4	(Australia) Todd Perry (Japan) Thomas Shimada	1	3
(Spain) **Álex López Morón** (Spain) **Rafael Nadal**	**6**	**6**
