= 2001 Croatia Open =

- Date: 16–22 July
- Edition: 12th
- Category: International Series
- Draw: 32S / 16D
- Prize money: $375,000
- Surface: Clay / outdoor
- Location: Umag, Croatia
- Venue: ITC Stella Maris

Champions

Singles
- (Spain) Carlos Moyá

Doubles
- (Argentina) Sergio Roitman / (Argentina) Andrés Schneiter
← 2000 ·	Croatia Open	· 2002 →

The 2001 Croatia Open was a men's tennis tournament played on outdoor clay courts at the ITC Stella Maris in Umag in Croatia and was part of the International Series of the 2001 ATP Tour. It was the 12th edition of the tournament and was held from 16 July through 22 July 2001. First-seeded Carlos Moyá won his second singles title at the event after 1996.

== Finals ==
=== Singles ===
(Spain) Carlos Moyá defeated (France) Jérôme Golmard 6–4, 3–6, 7–6^{(7–2)}

- It was Moyá's only title of the year and the 7th of his career.

=== Doubles ===
(Argentina) Sergio Roitman / (Argentina) Andrés Schneiter defeated (Croatia) Ivan Ljubičić / (Croatia) Lovro Zovko 6–2, 7–5

- It was Roitman's only title of the year and the 2nd of his career. It was Schneiter's only title of the year and the 2nd of his career.

== See also ==
- 2001 Croatian Bol Ladies Open
