= 2003 Croatia Open =

- Date: 21–27 July
- Edition: 14th
- Category: International Series
- Draw: 32S / 16D
- Prize money: $375,000
- Surface: Clay / outdoor
- Location: Umag, Croatia
- Venue: ITC Stella Maris

Champions

Singles
- (Spain) Carlos Moyá

Doubles
- (Spain) Álex López Morón / (Spain) Rafael Nadal
← 2002 ·	Croatia Open	· 2004 →

The 2003 Croatia Open was a men's tennis tournament played on outdoor clay courts at the ITC Stella Maris in Umag in Croatia and was part of the International Series of the 2003 ATP Tour. It was the 14th edition of the tournament and was held from 21 July through 27 July 2003. First-seeded Carlos Moyá won his third consecutive singles title at the event and fourth in total.

== Finals ==
=== Singles ===
(Spain) Carlos Moyá defeated (Italy) Filippo Volandri 6–4, 3–6, 7–5

- It was Moyá's 3rd title of the year and the 14th of his career.

=== Doubles ===
(Spain) Álex López Morón / (Spain) Rafael Nadal defeated (Australia) Todd Perry / (Japan) Thomas Shimada 6–1, 6–3

- It was López Morón's only title of the year and the 2nd of his career. It was Nadal's only title of the year and the 1st of his career.
