= 2002 Croatia Open =

- Date: 15–21 July
- Edition: 13th
- Category: International Series
- Draw: 32S / 16D
- Prize money: $356,000
- Surface: Clay / outdoor
- Location: Umag, Croatia
- Venue: ITC Stella Maris

Champions

Singles
- (Spain) Carlos Moyá

Doubles
- (Czech Republic) František Čermák / (Austria) Julian Knowle
← 2001 ·	Croatia Open	· 2003 →

The 2002 Croatia Open was a men's tennis tournament played on outdoor clay courts at the ITC Stella Maris in Umag in Croatia and was part of the International Series of the 2002 ATP Tour. It was the 13th edition of the tournament and was held from 15 July through 21 July 2002. Second-seeded Carlos Moyá won the singles title, his third at the event.

== Finals ==
=== Singles ===
(Spain) Carlos Moyá defeated (Spain) David Ferrer 6–2, 6–3

- It was Moyá's 3rd singles title of the year and the 10th of his career.

=== Doubles ===
(Czech Republic) František Čermák / (Austria) Julian Knowle defeated (Spain) Albert Portas / (Spain) Fernando Vicente 6–4, 6–4

- It was Čermák's 1st title of the year and the 1st of his career. It was Knowle's 2nd title of the year and the 2nd of his career.

== See also ==
- 2002 Croatian Bol Ladies Open
