= 2001 Croatia Open – Doubles =

Doubles
- 2001 Croatia Open
- 2000 Champions: (Spain) Álex López Morón (Spain) Albert Portas

Final
- Champions: (Argentina) Sergio Roitman (Italy) Andrés Schneiter
- Runners-up: (Croatia) Ivan Ljubičić (Croatia) Lovro Zovko
- Score: 6–2, 7–5

Details
- Draw: 16
- Seeds: 4

Events
Singles	Doubles
← 2000 ·	Croatia Open	· 2002 →

Álex López Morón and Albert Portas were the defending champions but only Portas competed that year with Germán Puentes.

Portas and Puentes lost in the first round to Giorgio Galimberti and Ion Moldovan.

Sergio Roitman and Andrés Schneiter won in the final 6–2, 7–5 against Ivan Ljubičić and Lovro Zovko.

== Seeds ==
Champion seeds are indicated in bold text while text in italics indicates the round in which those seeds were eliminated.

1. (Czech Republic) Tomáš Cibulec / (Czech Republic) Leoš Friedl (semifinals)
2. (Spain) Albert Portas / (Spain) Germán Puentes (first round)
3. (Argentina) **Sergio Roitman** / (Italy) **Andrés Schneiter (champions)**
4. (Czech Republic) Petr Luxa / (Czech Republic) Radek Štěpánek (semifinals)

== Draw ==
=== Key ===
- Q = Qualifier
- WC = Wild card
- LL = Lucky loser
- Alt = Alternate
- ITF = ITF entry
- PR = Protected ranking
- SR = Special ranking
- SE = Special exempt
- JE = Junior exempt
- JR = Junior Accelerator Programme entrant
- CO = College Accelerator Programme entrant
- NG = Next Gen Accelerator Program entrant
- w/o = Walkover
- r = Retired
- d = Defaulted

First round
1	(Czech Republic) **T Cibulec** (Czech Republic) **L Friedl**	5	**6**	**6**
WC	(Argentina) A Calleri (Argentina) M Puerta	**7**	2	1
(Australia) **J Kerr** (Australia) **G Silcock**	**6**	2	**6**
(Czech Republic) F Čermák (Czech Republic) D Škoch	3	**6**	1
3	(Argentina) **S Roitman** (Italy) **A Schneiter**	**6**	**6**
(Czech Republic) P Kovačka (Czech Republic) P Kudrnáč	4	2
WC	(Croatia) I Cerović (Slovenia) M Tkalec	3	1
(Australia) **P Hanley** (Australia) **N Healey**	**6**	**6**
(Italy) M Bertolini (Italy) C Brandi	3	2
WC	(Czech Republic) **J Levinský** (Czech Republic) **D Vacek**	**6**	**6**
(Czech Republic) M Damm (Czech Republic) M Tabara	3	6^{5}
4	(Czech Republic) **P Luxa** (Czech Republic) **R Štěpánek**	**6**	**7^{7}**
WC	(Croatia) M Radić (Slovenia) N Smole	4	5
(Croatia) **I Ljubičić** (Croatia) **L Zovko**	**6**	**7**
(Italy) **G Galimberti** (Romania) **I Moldovan**	**6**	**7^{7}**
2	(Spain) A Portas (Spain) G Puentes	1	6^{5}

Quarterfinals
1	(Czech Republic) **T Cibulec** (Czech Republic) **L Friedl**	**6**	**6**
(Australia) J Kerr (Australia) G Silcock	3	3
3	(Argentina) **S Roitman** (Italy) **A Schneiter**	**7**	**6**
(Australia) P Hanley (Australia) N Healey	5	4
WC	(Czech Republic) J Levinský (Czech Republic) D Vacek	3	6^{4}
4	(Czech Republic) **P Luxa** (Czech Republic) **R Štěpánek**	**6**	**7^{7}**
(Croatia) **I Ljubičić** (Croatia) **L Zovko**	**6**	**6**
(Italy) G Galimberti (Romania) I Moldovan	2	4

Semifinals
1	(Czech Republic) T Cibulec (Czech Republic) L Friedl	2	1
3	(Argentina) **S Roitman** (Italy) **A Schneiter**	**6**	**6**
4	(Czech Republic) P Luxa (Czech Republic) R Štěpánek	3	**6**	1
(Croatia) **I Ljubičić** (Croatia) **L Zovko**	**6**	1	**6**

Final
3	(Argentina) **Sergio Roitman** (Italy) **Andrés Schneiter**	**6**	**7**
(Croatia) Ivan Ljubičić (Croatia) Lovro Zovko	2	5
