= 2003 Croatia Open – Singles =

Singles
- 2003 Croatia Open
- 2002 Champion: (Spain) Carlos Moyá

Final
- Champion: (Spain) Carlos Moyá
- Runner-up: (Italy) Filippo Volandri
- Score: 6–4, 3–6, 7–5

Details
- Draw: 32 (4 Q / 3 WC )
- Seeds: 8

Events
Singles	Doubles
← 2002 ·	Croatia Open	· 2004 →

Carlos Moyá was the defending champion and won in the final 6–4, 3–6, 7–5 against Filippo Volandri.

== Seeds ==
A champion seed is indicated in bold text while text in italics indicates the round in which that seed was eliminated.

1. (Spain) **Carlos Moyá (champion)**
2. (Chile) Fernando González (quarterfinals)
3. n/a
4. (Belgium) Olivier Rochus (first round)
5. (Spain) Fernando Vicente (first round)
6. (Spain) Rafael Nadal (semifinals)
7. (Italy) Filippo Volandri (final)
8. (Spain) David Ferrer (quarterfinals)

== Draw ==
=== Key ===
- Q = Qualifier
- WC = Wild card
- LL = Lucky loser
- Alt = Alternate
- ITF = ITF entry
- PR = Protected ranking
- SR = Special ranking
- SE = Special exempt
- JE = Junior exempt
- JR = Junior Accelerator Programme entrant
- CO = College Accelerator Programme entrant
- NG = Next Gen Accelerator Program entrant
- w/o = Walkover
- r = Retired
- d = Defaulted

First round
1	(Spain) **C Moyá**	**7^{7}**	**6**
(Czech Republic) J Vaněk	6^{1}	4
(Argentina) **F Browne**	**7^{12}**	**6**
(Croatia) Ž Krajan	6^{10}	2
(Monaco) **J-R Lisnard**	**6**	**6**
(Austria) J Knowle	4	3
(Morocco) H Arazi	0	1	r
8	(Spain) **D Ferrer**	**6**	**3**
LL	(Croatia) **S Tuksar**	**7**
(Spain) A Montañés	5	r
(Sweden) **M Norman**	4	**6**	**7**
(Spain) R Ramírez Hidalgo	**6**	3	5
(Argentina) **M Puerta**	**6**	**7**
Q	(Costa Rica) J A Marín	3	5
(Romania) A Voinea	3	0	r
6	(Spain) **R Nadal**	**6**	**1**
5	(Spain) F Vicente	3	0
(Slovakia) **D Hrbatý**	**6**	**6**
WC	(Croatia) **M Radić**	1	**6**	**6**
(Italy) G Galimberti	**6**	4	4
(Belgium) C Rochus	5	4
WC	(Croatia) **I Karlović**	**7**	**6**
(Spain) **A Martín**	**6**	**6**
4	(Belgium) O Rochus	3	2
7	(Italy) **F Volandri**	**6**	**6**
(Hungary) A Sávolt	3	0
WC	(Switzerland) **S Wawrinka**	**6**	**6**
Q	(Croatia) R Karanušić	4	4
(Belgium) **K Vliegen**	**6**	2	**6**
Q	(Slovakia) M Mertiňák	0	**6**	3
Q	(Croatia) L Zovko	4	4
2	(Chile) **F González**	**6**	**6**

Second round
1	(Spain) **C Moyá**	**6**	**6**
(Argentina) F Browne	2	4
(Monaco) J-R Lisnard	3	**6**	5
8	(Spain) **D Ferrer**	**6**	4	**7**
LL	(Croatia) S Tuksar	6^{8}	6^{3}
(Sweden) **M Norman**	**7^{10}**	**7^{7}**
(Argentina) M Puerta	2	4
6	(Spain) **R Nadal**	**6**	**6**
(Slovakia) **D Hrbatý**	**7^{7}**	**7^{7}**
WC	(Croatia) M Radić	6^{3}	6^{4}
WC	(Croatia) I Karlović	**6**	3	6^{2}
(Spain) **A Martín**	2	**6**	**7^{7}**
7	(Italy) **F Volandri**	**6**	**6**
WC	(Switzerland) S Wawrinka	4	3
(Belgium) K Vliegen	0	r
2	(Chile) **F González**	**3**

Quarterfinals
1	(Spain) **C Moyá**	**6**	**6**
8	(Spain) D Ferrer	1	2
(Sweden) M Norman	3	4
6	(Spain) **R Nadal**	**6**	**6**
(Slovakia) **D Hrbatý**	**7**	**6**
(Spain) A Martín	5	2
7	(Italy) **F Volandri**	4	**6**	**7^{7}**
2	(Chile) F González	**6**	2	6^{4}

Semifinals
1	(Spain) **C Moyá**	**6**	**6**
6	(Spain) R Nadal	4	4
(Slovakia) D Hrbatý	6^{6}	1
7	(Italy) **F Volandri**	**7^{8}**	**6**

Final
1	(Spain) **Carlos Moyá**	**6**	3	**7**
7	(Italy) Filippo Volandri	4	**6**	5
