= 2002 Croatia Open – Singles =

Singles
- 2002 Croatia Open
- 2001 Champion: (Spain) Carlos Moyá

Final
- Champion: (Spain) Carlos Moyá
- Runner-up: (Spain) David Ferrer
- Score: 6–2, 6–3

Details
- Draw: 32 (4 Q / 3 WC )
- Seeds: 8

Events
Singles	Doubles
← 2001 ·	Croatia Open	· 2003 →

Carlos Moyá was the defending champion and won in the final 6–2, 6–3 against David Ferrer.

== Seeds ==
A champion seed is indicated in bold text while text in italics indicates the round in which that seed was eliminated:

1. (Argentina) David Nalbandian (first round)
2. (Spain) **Carlos Moyá (champion)**
3. (Chile) Marcelo Ríos (first round)
4. (Croatia) Ivan Ljubičić (quarterfinals)
5. (Spain) Fernando Vicente (quarterfinals)
6. (Argentina) Agustín Calleri (second round)
7. (Spain) Albert Montañés (first round)
8. (Czech Republic) Jan Vacek (first round)

== Draw ==
=== Key ===
- Q = Qualifier
- WC = Wild card
- LL = Lucky loser
- Alt = Alternate
- ITF = ITF entry
- PR = Protected ranking
- SR = Special ranking
- SE = Special exempt
- JE = Junior exempt
- JR = Junior Accelerator Programme entrant
- CO = College Accelerator Programme entrant
- NG = Next Gen Accelerator Program entrant
- w/o = Walkover
- r = Retired
- d = Defaulted

First round
1	(Argentina) D Nalbandian	4	3
Q	(Spain) **D Ferrer**	**6**	**6**
(Argentina) F Squillari	5	2
Q	(Spain) **M López**	**7**	**6**
WC	(Argentina) **G Coria**	**6**	6^{6}	**2**
(Spain) G Blanco	4	**7^{8}**	0/r
(Chile) **N Massú**	**6**	**6**
8	(Czech Republic) J Vacek	0	2
4	(Croatia) **I Ljubičić**	**6**	**6**
Q	(Greece) V Mazarakis	3	2
(Austria) J Knowle	4	3
WC	(Croatia) **M Radić**	**6**	**6**
(Argentina) E Massa	4	2
WC	(Croatia) **Ž Krajan**	**6**	**6**
(Peru) **L Horna**	**7**	**6**
7	(Spain) A Montañés	5	2
6	(Argentina) **A Calleri**	**6**	**6**
(Spain) F López	1	2
(Austria) **J Melzer**	2	**6**	**4**
(United States) V Spadea	**6**	3	2/r
(Costa Rica) **J A Marín**	**6**	3	**6**
(Italy) S Galvani	3	**6**	0
Q	(Romania) **V Hănescu**	**6**	**6**
3	(Chile) M Ríos	0	4
5	(Spain) **F Vicente**	**6**	1	**7**
(Czech Republic) O Fukárek	4	**6**	5
(France) **P-H Mathieu**	**6**	**7**
(Spain) A Portas	3	5
(Germany) **O Gross**	3	**7^{8}**	**7^{7}**
(Austria) M Hipfl	**6**	6^{6}	6^{5}
(Slovakia) K Kučera	3	1
2	(Spain) **C Moyá**	**6**	**6**

Second round
Q	(Spain) **D Ferrer**	**6**	**6**
Q	(Spain) M López	3	1
WC	(Argentina) **G Coria**	**7^{7}**	**6**
(Chile) N Massú	6^{4}	2
4	(Croatia) **I Ljubičić**	**7**	**6**
WC	(Croatia) M Radić	5	1
WC	(Croatia) **Ž Krajan**	**6**	4	**6**
(Peru) L Horna	4	**6**	3
6	(Argentina) A Calleri	**7^{7}**	5	4
(Austria) **J Melzer**	6^{3}	**7**	**6**
(Costa Rica) J A Marín	6^{6}	3
Q	(Romania) **V Hănescu**	**7^{8}**	**6**
5	(Spain) **F Vicente**	**7^{7}**	**6**
(France) P-H Mathieu	6^{5}	2
(Germany) O Gross	2	3
2	(Spain) **C Moyá**	**6**	**6**

Quarterfinals
Q	(Spain) **D Ferrer**	5	**6**	**7**
WC	(Argentina) G Coria	**7**	1	5
4	(Croatia) I Ljubičić	6^{2}	5
WC	(Croatia) **Ž Krajan**	**7^{7}**	**7**
(Austria) **J Melzer**	**6**	**6**
Q	(Romania) V Hănescu	4	4
5	(Spain) F Vicente	**6**	1	0
2	(Spain) **C Moyá**	3	**6**	**6**

Semifinals
Q	(Spain) **D Ferrer**	**6**	**6**
WC	(Croatia) Ž Krajan	2	1
(Austria) J Melzer	6^{1}	1
2	(Spain) **C Moyá**	**7^{7}**	**6**

Final
Q	(Spain) David Ferrer	2	3
2	(Spain) **Carlos Moyá**	**6**	**6**
