= Ripoll (surname) =

Ripoll is a surname. Notable people with the surname include:

- Alberto Noguera Ripoll (born 1989), Spanish footballer
- Álvaro Antón Ripoll (born 1994), Spanish footballer
- Bernie Ripoll (born 1966), Australian lobbyist and former politician
- Cayetano Ripoll (1778–1826), Spanish schoolteacher
- Darío Ripoll (born 1970), Mexican actor
- Emilio Castelar y Ripoll (1832–1899), Spanish politician
- Juan Manuel Asensi Ripoll (born 1949), Spanish retired footballer
- Maria Ripoll (born 1963), Spanish film director
- Marc Marco Ripoll (born 1981), Spanish photographer and former tennis player
- Michael Ríos (born 1985), Chilean former footballer
- Shakira Isabel Mebarak Ripoll (born 1977), Colombian singer, songwriter, dancer, and record producer
- Sylvain Ripoll (born 1971), French football manager and former player
- Tomás Ripoll (died 1747), Spanish Dominican and Master of the Order of Preachers
- Valeria Ripoll (born 1982), Uruguayan politician and trade unionist
- Vilma Ripoll (born 1954), Argentine nurse and politician

== See also ==
- Ripoll (disambiguation)
