= 2002 Croatian Bol Ladies Open =

- Date: 29 April – 5 May
- Edition: 9th
- Category: Tier III
- Draw: 30S / 16D
- Prize money: $170,000
- Surface: Clay / outdoor
- Location: Bol, Croatia

Champions

Singles
- (Sweden) Åsa Svensson

Doubles
- (Italy) Tathiana Garbin / (Indonesia) Angelique Widjaja
← 2001 ·	Croatian Bol Ladies Open	· 2003 →

The 2002 Croatian Bol Ladies Open was a women's tennis tournament played on outdoor clay courts in Bol, Croatia and was part of the Tier III category of the 2002 WTA Tour. It was the ninth edition of the tournament and was held from 29 April until 5 May 2002. Unseeded Åsa Svensson won the singles title and earned $27,000 first-prize money.

== Finals ==
=== Singles ===
(Sweden) Åsa Svensson defeated (Croatia) Iva Majoli 6–3, 4–6, 6–1

- It was Svensson's 1st singles title of the year and the 2nd of her career.

=== Doubles ===
(Italy) Tathiana Garbin / (Indonesia) Angelique Widjaja defeated (Russia) Elena Bovina / (Slovakia) Henrieta Nagyová 7–5, 3–6, 6–4

== See also ==
- 2002 Croatia Open
