= 2002 Croatian Bol Ladies Open – Singles =

Singles
- 2002 Croatian Bol Ladies Open

Final
- Champion: (Sweden) Åsa Svensson
- Runner-up: (Croatia) Iva Majoli
- Score: 6–3, 4–6, 6–1

Details
- Draw: 30 (2WC/4Q)
- Seeds: 8

Events
Singles	Doubles
← 2001 ·	Croatian Bol Ladies Open	· 2003 →

Ángeles Montolio was the defending champion, but lost in the first round to María Sánchez Lorenzo.

Åsa Svensson won the title by defeating Iva Majoli 6–3, 4–6, 6–1 in the final.

== Seeds ==
The first two seeds received a bye to the second round.

1. (Russia) Elena Dementieva (quarterfinals)
2. (Luxembourg) Anne Kremer (second round)
3. (Bulgaria) Magdalena Maleeva (second round)
4. (Croatia) Iva Majoli (final)
5. (Spain) Ángeles Montolio (first round)
6. (Slovakia) Henrieta Nagyová (second round)
7. (Slovenia) Tina Pisnik (quarterfinals)
8. (Slovenia) Katarina Srebotnik (second round)

== Draw ==
=== Key ===
- Q = Qualifier
- WC = Wild card
- LL = Lucky loser
- Alt = Alternate
- SE = Special exempt
- PR = Protected ranking
- ITF = ITF entry
- JE = Junior exempt
- w/o = Walkover
- r = Retired
- d = Defaulted
- SR = Special ranking

=== Finals ===
Semifinals
(Italy) Tathiana Garbin	3	2
(Sweden) Åsa Svensson	6	6
4	(Croatia) Iva Majoli	6^{5}	7	6
Q	(Czech Republic) Libuše Průšová	7^{7}	5	4

Final
(Sweden) Åsa Svensson	6	4	6
4	(Croatia) Iva Majoli	3	6	1

=== Top half ===
First round
(Indonesia) A Widjaja	6	6
(Netherlands) S Noorlander	2	0
(Italy) T Garbin	6	6
(Ukraine) T Perebiynis	4	2
(Slovenia) M Matevžič	6^{5}	2
6	(Slovakia) H Nagyová	7^{7}	6
3	(Bulgaria) M Maleeva	6	6
(Croatia) S Talaja	3	4
(Russia) E Bovina	4	5
(Sweden) Å Svensson	6	7
(Ukraine) J Vakulenko	7^{7}	2	2
(Russia) A Kournikova	6^{3}	6	6
Q	(Czech Republic) Z Hejdová	2	5
7	(Slovenia) T Pisnik	6	7

Second round
1	(Russia) E Dementieva	6	6
(Indonesia) A Widjaja	2	1
(Italy) T Garbin	6	7
6	(Slovakia) H Nagyová	3	5
3	(Bulgaria) M Maleeva	5	3
(Sweden) Å Svensson	7	6
(Russia) A Kournikova	7^{7}	3	3
7	(Slovenia) T Pisnik	6^{1}	6	6

Quarterfinals
1	(Russia) E Dementieva	7	5	5
(Italy) T Garbin	5	7	7
(Sweden) Å Svensson	7	6
7	(Slovenia) T Pisnik	5	1

Semifinals
(Italy) T Garbin	3	2
(Sweden) Å Svensson	6	6

=== Bottom half ===
First round
8	(Slovenia) K Srebotnik	6	6^{7}	6
(Czech Republic) Z Ondrášková	1	7^{9}	3
Q	(Russia) V Zvonareva	6	6
(Germany) J Kandarr	3	2
(Belarus) T Poutchek	7^{7}	0	4
(Croatia) J Kostanić	6^{5}	6	6
(Slovakia) Ľ Cervanová	6	4	2
4	(Croatia) I Majoli	4	6	6
5	(Spain) Á Montolio	2	2
Q	(Spain) M Sánchez Lorenzo	6	6
WC	(Croatia) K Šprem	3	0
Q	(Czech Republic) L Průšová	6	6
(Argentina) M Díaz Oliva	6	6
WC	(Czech Republic) S Kleinová	2	3

Second round
8	(Slovenia) K Srebotnik	4	2
Q	(Russia) V Zvonareva	6	6
(Croatia) J Kostanić	6	4	6^{4}
4	(Croatia) I Majoli	2	6	7^{7}
Q	(Spain) M Sánchez Lorenzo	4	3
Q	(Czech Republic) L Průšová	6	6
(Argentina) M Díaz Oliva	6	7
2	(Luxembourg) A Kremer	2	5

Quarterfinals
Q	(Russia) V Zvonareva	2	0
4	(Croatia) I Majoli	6	6
Q	(Czech Republic) L Průšová	6	4	6
(Argentina) M Díaz Oliva	1	6	2

Semifinals
4	(Croatia) I Majoli	6^{5}	7	6
Q	(Czech Republic) L Průšová	7^{7}	5	4
