= 2002 Croatian Bol Ladies Open – Doubles =

Doubles
- 2002 Croatian Bol Ladies Open

Final
- Champions: (Italy) Tathiana Garbin (Indonesia) Angelique Widjaja
- Runners-up: (Russia) Elena Bovina (Slovakia) Henrieta Nagyová
- Score: 7–5, 3–6, 6–4

Events
Singles	Doubles
- Croatian Bol Ladies Open

María José Martínez Sánchez and Anabel Medina Garrigues were the defending champions, but neither competed this year.

Tathiana Garbin and Angelique Widjaja won the title by defeating Elena Bovina and Henrieta Nagyová 7–5, 3–6, 6–4 in the final.

== Seeds ==
1. (Slovenia) Tina Križan / (Slovenia) Katarina Srebotnik (quarterfinals)
2. (Russia) Elena Bovina / (Slovakia) Henrieta Nagyová (final)
3. (South Africa) Kim Grant / (United States) Abigail Spears (semifinals)
4. (South Africa) Nannie de Villiers / (South Africa) Natalie Grandin (quarterfinals)

== Draw ==
Key

- Q = Qualifier
- WC = Wild card
- LL = Lucky loser
- Alt = Alternate
- ITF = ITF entry
- PR = Protected ranking
- SR = Special ranking
- SE = Special exempt
- JE = Junior exempt
- JR = Junior Accelerator Programme entrant
- CO = College Accelerator Programme entrant
- NG = Next Gen Accelerator Program entrant
- w/o = Walkover
- r = Retired
- d = Defaulted

=== Draw ===
First round
1	(Slovenia) T Križan (Slovenia) K Srebotnik	7	7^{7}
(Russia) G Fokina (Russia) S Kuznetsova	5	6^{3}
(Italy) T Garbin (Indonesia) A Widjaja	6	6
(Ukraine) T Perebiynis (Slovenia) T Pisnik	3	1
3	(South Africa) K Grant (United States) A Spears	2	7	6
WC	(Croatia) J Kostanić (Croatia) S Talaja	6	5	4
(Belarus) T Poutchek (Germany) C Schneider	6	6
(Netherlands) S Noorlander (New Zealand) S Stephens	4	3
Q	(Russia) E Kozhokina (Russia) V Zvonareva	1	7^{7}	4
(Luxembourg) A Kremer (Bulgaria) M Maleeva	6	6^{5}	6
(Austria) D Klemenschits (Austria) S Klemenschits	2	7^{7}	4
4	(South Africa) N de Villiers (South Africa) N Grandin	6	6^{5}	6
(Russia) G Fattakhetdinova (Czech Republic) Z Hejdová	6	2	4
(Germany) K Freye (Slovenia) M Matevžič	4	6	6
(Czech Republic) O Blahotová (Czech Republic) E Martincová	1	1
2	(Russia) E Bovina (Slovakia) H Nagyová	6	6

Quarterfinals
1	(Slovenia) T Križan (Slovenia) K Srebotnik	4	6	4
(Italy) T Garbin (Indonesia) A Widjaja	6	4	6
3	(South Africa) K Grant (United States) A Spears	6	7
(Belarus) T Poutchek (Germany) C Schneider	2	5
(Luxembourg) A Kremer (Bulgaria) M Maleeva	6	6
4	(South Africa) N de Villiers (South Africa) N Grandin	1	3
(Germany) K Freye (Slovenia) M Matevžič	3	6	4
2	(Russia) E Bovina (Slovakia) H Nagyová	6	0	6

Semifinals
(Italy) T Garbin (Indonesia) A Widjaja	6	6
3	(South Africa) K Grant (United States) A Spears	2	2
(Luxembourg) A Kremer (Bulgaria) M Maleeva	0	6	4
2	(Russia) E Bovina (Slovakia) H Nagyová	6	4	6

Final
(Italy) T Garbin (Indonesia) A Widjaja	7	3	6
2	(Russia) E Bovina (Slovakia) H Nagyová	5	6	4
