= 2001 Croatia Open – Singles =

Singles
- 2001 Croatia Open
- 2000 Champion: (Chile) Marcelo Ríos

Final
- Champion: (Spain) Carlos Moyá
- Runner-up: (France) Jérôme Golmard
- Score: 6–4, 3–6, 7–6^{(7–2)}

Details
- Draw: 32 (4 Q / 3 WC )
- Seeds: 8

Events
| Singles | Doubles |
| ← 2000 · | Croatia Open | · 2002 → |

Marcelo Ríos was the defending champion but did not compete that year.

Carlos Moyá won in the final 6–4, 3–6, 7–6^{(7–2)} against Jérôme Golmard.

== Seeds ==
A champion seed is indicated in bold text while text in italics indicates the round in which that seed was eliminated.

1. (Spain) **Carlos Moyá (champion)**
2. (Spain) Albert Portas (second round)
3. (Czech Republic) Bohdan Ulihrach (second round)
4. (Czech Republic) Michal Tabara (second round)
5. (France) Jérôme Golmard (final)
6. (Croatia) Ivan Ljubičić (quarterfinals)
7. (Spain) Félix Mantilla (quarterfinals)
8. (Argentina) Agustín Calleri (second round)

== Draw ==
=== Key ===
- Q = Qualifier
- WC = Wild card
- LL = Lucky loser
- Alt = Alternate
- ITF = ITF entry
- PR = Protected ranking
- SR = Special ranking
- SE = Special exempt
- JE = Junior exempt
- JR = Junior Accelerator Programme entrant
- CO = College Accelerator Programme entrant
- NG = Next Gen Accelerator Program entrant
- w/o = Walkover
- r = Retired
- d = Defaulted

First round
WC/1 | (Spain) **C Moyá** | 5 | **6** | **6**
(Czech Republic) J Vaněk | **7** | 4 | 3
(Spain) **E B Álvarez** | **6** | **6**
(Czech Republic) T Zíb | 1 | 2
WC | (Slovenia) M Tkalec | **6** | 6^{7} | 3
(Hungary) **A Sávolt** | 4 | **7^{9}** | **6**
(Argentina) M Puerta | **6** | 6^{5} | 0
8 | (Argentina) **A Calleri** | 4 | **7^{7}** | **6**
3 | (Czech Republic) **B Ulihrach** | **6** | **6**
(Germany) T Behrend | 4 | 3
Q | (Romania) I Moldovan | **6** | 1 | 1
(Argentina) **D Nalbandian** | 3 | **6** | **6**
Q | (Slovenia) I Božič | 3 | **7^{12}** | 3
(Spain) **Ó Serrano** | **6** | 6^{10} | **6**
(Germany) M Hantschk | 6^{3} | 2
7 | (Spain) **F Mantilla** | **7^{7}** | **6**
5 | (France) **J Golmard** | **6** | **6**
(Switzerland) G Bastl | 3 | 3
(Czech Republic) M Damm | 2 | 3
(Peru) **L Horna** | **6** | **6**
(Spain) **A Montañés** | **6** | 3 | **6**
Q | (Italy) G Galimberti | 3 | **6** | 1
Q | (Italy) M Martelli | 4 | 4
4 | (Czech Republic) **M Tabara** | **6** | **6**
6 | (Croatia) **I Ljubičić** | **7^{10}** | **6**
(Argentina) F Browne | 6^{8} | 2
WC | (Croatia) I Vajda | 2 | 5
(Italy) **F Luzzi** | **6** | **7**
(Czech Republic) C Doseděl | 1 | 4
(Romania) **A Voinea** | **6** | **6**
(Spain) G Puentes | 1 | 4
2 | (Spain) **A Portas** | **6** | **6**

Second round
WC/1 | (Spain) **C Moyá** | **6** | 5 | **6**
(Spain) E B Álvarez | 4 | **7** | 1
(Hungary) **A Sávolt** | 3 | **2**
8 | (Argentina) A Calleri | **6** | 3 | r
3 | (Czech Republic) B Ulihrach | 2 | 1
(Argentina) **D Nalbandian** | **6** | **6**
(Spain) Ó Serrano | 2 | 2
7 | (Spain) **F Mantilla** | **6** | **6**
5 | (France) **J Golmard** | **2**
(Peru) L Horna | 2 | r
(Spain) **A Montañés** | **6** | **6**
4 | (Czech Republic) M Tabara | 2 | 0
6 | (Croatia) **I Ljubičić** | **6** | **7^{7}**
(Italy) F Luzzi | 2 | 6^{2}
(Romania) **A Voinea** | **7^{7}** | 0 | **6**
2 | (Spain) A Portas | 6^{1} | **6** | 4

Quarterfinals
WC/1 | (Spain) **C Moyá** | **6** | **6**
(Hungary) A Sávolt | 4 | 4
(Argentina) **D Nalbandian** | **6** | **6**
7 | (Spain) F Mantilla | 2 | 3
5 | (France) **J Golmard** | **7** | **7**
(Spain) A Montañés | 5 | 5
6 | (Croatia) I Ljubičić | 6^{6} | **6** | 3
(Romania) **A Voinea** | **7^{8}** | 4 | **6**

Semifinals
WC/1 | (Spain) **C Moyá** | **6** | **7**
(Argentina) D Nalbandian | 4 | 5
5 | (France) **J Golmard** | **7** | **6**
(Romania) A Voinea | 5 | 3

Final
WC/1 | (Spain) **Carlos Moyá** | **6** | 3 | **7^{7}**
5 | (France) Jérôme Golmard | 4 | **6** | 6^{2}
