= Ripoll (disambiguation) =

Ripoll is the capital of the comarca of Ripollès, Catalonia, Spain.

Ripoll may also refer to:

- Ripoll (surname), a surname of Catalan origin
- Ripoll (river), Catalonia, Spain
- 228133 Ripoll, an asteroid
