= Yugoslavian International Championships =

Defunct tennis tournament
- Tour: ILTF Circuit (1921-1968)
- Founded: 1921; 104 years ago
- Abolished: 1977; 48 years ago
- Location: Belgrade; Dubrovnik; Split; Zagreb
- Venue: Various

Current champions
- Men's singles: (Socialist Federal Republic of Yugoslavia) Zlatko Ivancic

The Yugoslavian International Championships was a tennis tournament held between 1921 and 1977.

== History ==
The Yugoslavian International Championships was a tennis tournament held in various locations in Yugoslavia. It was open to international competitors. Before the 1970s it was limited to amateur competitors. The tournament began in 1921. Among the overseas winners were Tony Mottram, Ramanathan Krishnan, Billy Knight, István Gulyás and Jan Kodeš. When the Grand Prix circuit began in 1970, the event was not part of it, so it declined and the last event was held in 1977.

== Past finals ==
=== Men's singles ===
| Year | Champion | Runner-up | Score |
|---|---|---|---|
| 1921 | (Socialist Federal Republic of Yugoslavia) Nikola Antolkovic | | |
| 1922 | (Austria) Waldemar Munk | (Socialist Federal Republic of Yugoslavia) F. Fraudenreich | 6-0, 0-6, 6-3, 6-4 |
| 1923 | (Austria) Rolf Kinzl | | |
| 1924 | (Socialist Federal Republic of Yugoslavia) Nikola Antolkovic | | |
| 1925 | (Austria) Franz Matejka | (Austria) Ludwig Albrecht | 6-2, 5-7, 7-9, 6-4, 6-3 |
| 1926 | (Socialist Federal Republic of Yugoslavia) Đorđe Dunđerski | | |
| 1927 | (Austria) Hermann Artens | (Austria) Ludwig Albrecht | w/o |
| 1928 | (Austria) Willy Winterstein | (Romania) Laszlo Dorner | 5-7, 6-0, 6-1, 8-6 |
| 1929 | (Hungary) Béla von Kehrling | (Czechoslovakia) Josef Maleček | 2-6, 6-2, 6-0, 6-1 |
| 1930 | (France) Emmanuel du Plaix | (Hungary) Béla von Kehrling | 6-1, 6-4, 3-6, 6-2 |
| 1931 | (Czechoslovakia) Vojtěch Vodička | (Hungary) Emil Gabori | 4-6, 6-4, 3-6, 6-2, 6-1 |
| 1932 | (Socialist Federal Republic of Yugoslavia) Franjo Kukuljević | (Socialist Federal Republic of Yugoslavia) Franjo Punčec | 6-2, 6-1, 5-7, 0-6, 6-4 |
| 1933 | (Czechoslovakia) Roderich Menzel | (Italy) Uberto De Morpurgo | 6-4, 6-1, 6-1 |
| 1934 | (Socialist Federal Republic of Yugoslavia) Franjo Punčec | (Socialist Federal Republic of Yugoslavia) Josip Palada | 6-3, 6-0, 6-3 |
| 1935 | (Socialist Federal Republic of Yugoslavia) Franjo Punčec | (Socialist Federal Republic of Yugoslavia) Josip Palada | 6-4, 6-1, 7-5 |
| 1936 | (Socialist Federal Republic of Yugoslavia) Franjo Punčec | (France) André Martin-Legeay | 6-3, 11-9, 8-6 |
| 1937 | (Socialist Federal Republic of Yugoslavia) Franjo Punčec | (Socialist Federal Republic of Yugoslavia) Josip Palada | 6-2, 6-2, 6-1 |
| 1938 | (Hungary) Lehel Bano | (Socialist Federal Republic of Yugoslavia) Ljubisa Radovanovic | |
| 1939-47 | No competition | | |
| 1948 | (Socialist Federal Republic of Yugoslavia) Milan Branović | | |
| 1949 | (Socialist Federal Republic of Yugoslavia) Dragutin Mitić | (Socialist Federal Republic of Yugoslavia) Milan Branović | |
| 1950 | (United States) Irvin Dorfman | (United States) Fred Kovaleski | 1-6, 6-1, 6-3, 6-4 |
| 1951 | (Socialist Federal Republic of Yugoslavia) Milan Branović | (Socialist Federal Republic of Yugoslavia) Josip Palada | 6-1, 6-2, 6-3 |
| 1952 | (United States) Fred Kovaleski | (Socialist Federal Republic of Yugoslavia) | |
| 1953 | (United Kingdom) Tony Mottram | (Sweden) Lennart Bergelin | 6-2, 6-4, 6-0 |
| 1954 | (Australia) Jack Arkinstall | (United Kingdom) Tony Mottram | 1-6, 6-2, 6-0 |
| 1955 | (Australia) Jack Arkinstall | (Socialist Federal Republic of Yugoslavia) Jozef Platek | 6-2, 6-3, 5-7, 6-2 |
| 1956 | (Socialist Federal Republic of Yugoslavia) Ivko Plećević | (Socialist Federal Republic of Yugoslavia) Sima Nikolić | 6-2, 6-4, 6-0 |
| 1957 | (Poland) Władysław Skonecki | (Socialist Federal Republic of Yugoslavia) Kamilo Keretic | 4-6, 6-3, 5-7, 7-5, 6-2 |
| 1958 | (India) Ramanathan Krishnan | (France) Robert Haillet | 8-6, 6-2, 3-6, 6-2 |
| 1959 | (Poland) Wiesław Gąsiorek | (India) Arcot Uday Kumar | 6-2, 6-3 |
| 1960 | (Hungary) István Gulyás | (Poland) Wiesław Gąsiorek | 7-5, 6-1, 6-0 |
| 1961 | (Socialist Federal Republic of Yugoslavia) Boro Jovanović | (Hungary) István Gulyás | 8-10, 6-2, 2-6, 6-4, 6-1 |
| 1962 | (Hungary) Ferenc Komaromy | (Australia) Allan Kendall | |
| 1963 | (Socialist Federal Republic of Yugoslavia) Nikola Pilić | (Socialist Federal Republic of Yugoslavia) Nikola Špear | 6-3, 7-5, 6-2 |
| 1964 | (United Kingdom) Billy Knight | (Australia) Martin Mulligan | 11-9, 6-0, 6-1 |
| 1965 | (Socialist Federal Republic of Yugoslavia) Nikola Pilić | (Socialist Federal Republic of Yugoslavia) Boro Jovanović | 9-7, 2-6, 6-1, 6-2 |
| 1966 | (Socialist Federal Republic of Yugoslavia) Nikola Pilić | (Italy) Nicola Pietrangeli | 6-4, 6-4, 6-3 |
| 1967 | (Socialist Federal Republic of Yugoslavia) Željko Franulović | (Socialist Federal Republic of Yugoslavia) Boro Jovanović | 4-6, 6-4, 8-6, 6-4 |
| 1968 | (Hungary) István Gulyás | (Socialist Federal Republic of Yugoslavia) Željko Franulović | 6-1, 6-3, 6-2 |
| 1969 | (Socialist Federal Republic of Yugoslavia) Nikola Špear | (Czechoslovakia) Jan Kukal | 6-3, 6-0, 3-6, 1-6, 9-7 |
| 1970 | (Socialist Federal Republic of Yugoslavia) Željko Franulović | (Socialist Federal Republic of Yugoslavia) Nikola Špear | 6-4, 6-2, 8-6 |
| 1971 | (Socialist Federal Republic of Yugoslavia) Željko Franulović | (Spain) Manuel Orantes | 6-1, 6-2, 6-2 |
| 1972 | (Czechoslovakia) Jan Kodeš | (Greece) Nicky Kalogeropoulos | 8-6, 6-4, 6-8, 2-6, 9-7 |
| 1973 | (Austria) Hans Kary | (Greece) Nicky Kalogeropoulos | 8-6, 0-6, 6-2, 6-0 |
| 1974 | (Czechoslovakia) Pavel Huťka | | |
| 1975 | (Czechoslovakia) Jan Šimbera | | |
| 1977 | (Socialist Federal Republic of Yugoslavia) Zlatko Ivancic | | |

== See also ==
- Category:National and multi-national tennis tournaments
