= Croatia Open =

Professional tennis tournament in Umag, Croatia

Coordinates: 45.44769°N 13.519803°E

Croatia Open Umag
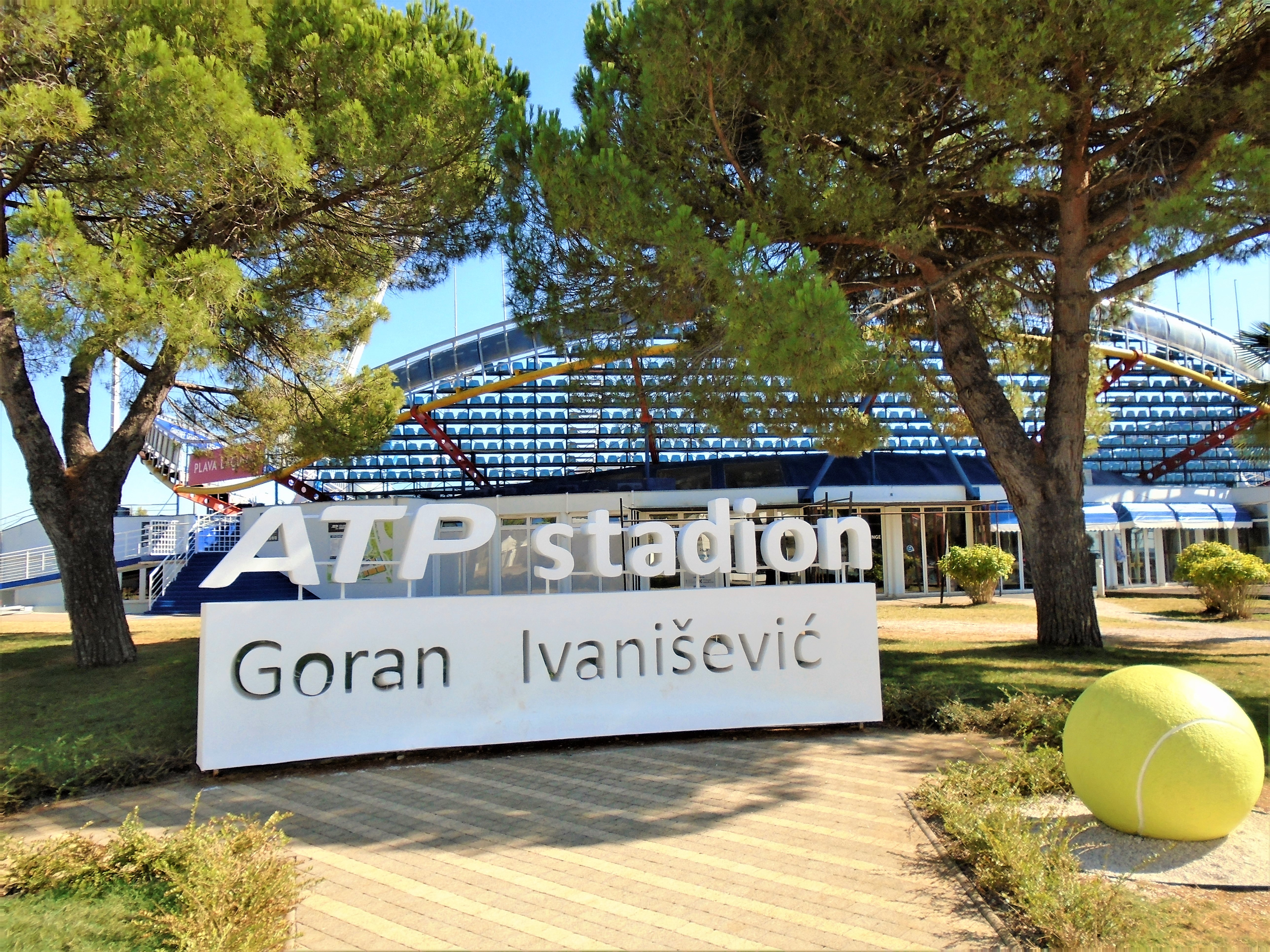

ATP Tour
- Event name: Plava Laguna Croatia Open Umag
- Founded: 1990
- Editions: 35 (2025)
- Location: Umag; Croatia
- Venue: ITC Stella Maris
- Category: ATP Tour 250 / ATP International Series / ATP World Series (1990–current)
- Surface: Clay / outdoors
- Draw: 28S/16Q/16D
- Prize money: €579,320 (2024)
- Website: croatiaopen.hr

Current champions (2026)
- Singles: (Spain) Daniel Mérida
- Doubles: (Czech Republic) Adam Pavlásek (Czech Republic) Patrik Rikl

The Croatia Open Umag, sponsored by Plava Laguna, is a men's ATP tennis tournament held in Umag, Croatia that is part of the 250 series of the ATP Tour. It is played on outdoor red clay courts. The tournament began in 1990 and is the oldest tennis tournament in Croatia.

It began as the Yugoslav Open, when Umag was in Yugoslavia, and has been played every year since. Carlos Moyá has won the tournament a record five times; he also holds the record for the most consecutive wins at three. His most recent win was in 2007. In 2016, the centre court stadium was named after Croatian tennis player Goran Ivanišević.

== Past finals ==
=== Singles ===
Year	Champions	Runners-up	Score
1990	(Socialist Federal Republic of Yugoslavia) Goran Prpić	(Socialist Federal Republic of Yugoslavia) Goran Ivanišević	6–3, 4–6, 6–4
1991	(Soviet Union) Dimitri Poliakov	(Spain) Javier Sánchez	6–4, 6–4
1992	(Austria) Thomas Muster	(Argentina) Franco Davín	6–1, 4–6, 6–4
1993	(Austria) Thomas Muster (2)	(Spain) Alberto Berasategui	7–5, 3–6, 6–3
1994	(Spain) Alberto Berasategui	(Slovakia) Karol Kučera	6–2, 6–4
1995	(Austria) Thomas Muster (3)	(Spain) Carlos Costa	3–6, 7–6^{(7–5)}, 6–4
1996	(Spain) Carlos Moyá	(Spain) Félix Mantilla	6–0, 7–6^{(7–4)}
1997	(Spain) Félix Mantilla	(Spain) Sergi Bruguera	6–3, 7–5
1998	(Czech Republic) Bohdan Ulihrach	(Sweden) Magnus Norman	6–3, 7–6^{(7–0)}
1999	(Sweden) Magnus Norman	(United States) Jeff Tarango	6–2, 6–4
2000	(Chile) Marcelo Ríos	(Argentina) Mariano Puerta	7–6^{(7–1)}, 4–6, 6–3
2001	(Spain) Carlos Moyá (2)	(France) Jérôme Golmard	6–4, 3–6, 7–6^{(7–2)}
2002	(Spain) Carlos Moyá (3)	(Spain) David Ferrer	6–2, 6–3
2003	(Spain) Carlos Moyá (4)	(Italy) Filippo Volandri	6–4, 3–6, 7–5
2004	(Argentina) Guillermo Cañas	(Italy) Filippo Volandri	7–5, 6–3
2005	(Argentina) Guillermo Coria	(Spain) Carlos Moyá	6–2, 4–6, 6–2
2006	(Switzerland) Stan Wawrinka	(Serbia) Novak Djokovic	6–6^{(1–3)}, retired
2007	(Spain) Carlos Moyá (5)	(Romania) Andrei Pavel	6–4, 6–2
2008	(Spain) Fernando Verdasco	(Russia) Igor Andreev	3–6, 6–4, 7–6^{(7–4)}
2009	(Russia) Nikolay Davydenko	(Spain) Juan Carlos Ferrero	6–3, 6–0
2010	(Spain) Juan Carlos Ferrero	(Italy) Potito Starace	6–4, 6–4
2011	(Ukraine) Alexandr Dolgopolov	(Croatia) Marin Čilić	6–4, 3–6, 6–3
2012	(Croatia) Marin Čilić	(Spain) Marcel Granollers	6–4, 6–2
2013	(Spain) Tommy Robredo	(Italy) Fabio Fognini	6–0, 6–3
2014	(Uruguay) Pablo Cuevas	(Spain) Tommy Robredo	6–3, 6–4
2015	(Austria) Dominic Thiem	(Portugal) João Sousa	6–4, 6–1
2016	(Italy) Fabio Fognini	(Slovakia) Andrej Martin	6–4, 6–1
2017	(Russia) Andrey Rublev	(Italy) Paolo Lorenzi	6–4, 6–2
2018	(Italy) Marco Cecchinato	(Argentina) Guido Pella	6–2, 7–6^{(7–4)}
2019	(Serbia) Dušan Lajović	(Hungary) Attila Balázs	7–5, 7–5
2020	Not held due to COVID-19 pandemic		
2021	(Spain) Carlos Alcaraz	(France) Richard Gasquet	6–2, 6–2
2022	(Italy) Jannik Sinner	(Spain) Carlos Alcaraz	6–7^{(5–7)}, 6–1, 6–1
2023	(Australia) Alexei Popyrin	(Switzerland) Stan Wawrinka	6–7^{(5–7)}, 6–3, 6–4
2024	(Argentina) Francisco Cerúndolo	(Italy) Lorenzo Musetti	2–6, 6–4, 7–6^{(7–5)}
2025	(Italy) Luciano Darderi	(Spain) Carlos Taberner	6–3, 6–3
2026	(Spain) Daniel Mérida	(Bosnia and Herzegovina) Damir Džumhur	6–2, 5–7, 6–2

=== Doubles ===
Year	Champions	Runners-up	Score
1990	(Czechoslovakia) Vojtěch Flégl (Czechoslovakia) Daniel Vacek	(Soviet Union) Andrei Cherkasov (Soviet Union) Andrei Olhovskiy	6–4, 6–4
1991	(Israel) Gilad Bloom (Spain) Javier Sánchez	(United States) Richey Reneberg (United States) David Wheaton	7–6, 2–6, 6–1
1992	(Germany) David Prinosil (Czechoslovakia) Richard Vogel	(Netherlands) Sander Groen (Germany) Lars Koslowski	6–3, 6–7, 7–6
1993	(Belgium) Filip Dewulf (Belgium) Tom Vanhoudt	(Spain) Jordi Arrese (Spain) Francisco Roig	6–4, 7–5
1994	(Uruguay) Diego Pérez (Spain) Francisco Roig	(Slovakia) Karol Kučera (Kenya) Paul Wekesa	6–2, 6–4
1995	(Argentina) Luis Lobo (Spain) Javier Sánchez (2)	(Sweden) David Ekerot (Hungary) László Markovits	6–4, 6–0
1996	(Argentina) Pablo Albano (Argentina) Luis Lobo (2)	(Latvia) Ģirts Dzelde (Austria) Udo Plamberger	6–4, 6–1
1997	(Romania) Dinu Pescariu (Italy) Davide Sanguinetti	(Slovakia) Dominik Hrbatý (Slovakia) Karol Kučera	7–6, 6–4
1998	(United Kingdom) Neil Broad (South Africa) Piet Norval	(Czech Republic) Jiří Novák (Czech Republic) David Rikl	6–1, 3–6, 6–3
1999	(Argentina) Mariano Puerta (Spain) Javier Sánchez (3)	(Italy) Massimo Bertolini (Italy) Cristian Brandi	3–6, 6–2, 6–3
2000	(Spain) Álex López Morón (Spain) Albert Portas	(Croatia) Ivan Ljubičić (Croatia) Lovro Zovko	6–1, 7–6^{(7–2)}
2001	(Argentina) Sergio Roitman (Argentina) Andrés Schneiter	(Croatia) Ivan Ljubičić (Croatia) Lovro Zovko	6–2, 7–5
2002	(Czech Republic) František Čermák (Austria) Julian Knowle	(Spain) Albert Portas (Spain) Fernando Vicente	6–4, 6–4
2003	(Spain) Álex López Morón (2) (Spain) Rafael Nadal	(Australia) Todd Perry (Japan) Thomas Shimada	6–1, 6–3
2004	(Argentina) José Acasuso (Brazil) Flávio Saretta	(Czech Republic) Jaroslav Levinský (Czech Republic) David Škoch	4–6, 6–2, 6–4
2005	(Czech Republic) Jiří Novák (Czech Republic) Petr Pála	(Slovakia) Michal Mertiňák (Czech Republic) David Škoch	6–3, 6–3
2006	(Czech Republic) Jaroslav Levinský (Czech Republic) David Škoch	(Spain) Guillermo García López (Spain) Albert Portas	6–4, 6–4
2007	(Czech Republic) Lukáš Dlouhý (Slovakia) Michal Mertiňák	(Czech Republic) Jaroslav Levinský (Czech Republic) David Škoch	6–1, 6–1
2008	(Slovakia) Michal Mertiňák (2) (Czech Republic) Petr Pála (2)	(Argentina) Carlos Berlocq (Italy) Fabio Fognini	2–6, 6–3, [10–5]
2009	(Czech Republic) František Čermák (2) (Slovakia) Michal Mertiňák (3)	(Sweden) Johan Brunström (Netherlands Antilles) Jean-Julien Rojer	6–4, 6–4
2010	(Czech Republic) Leoš Friedl (Slovakia) Filip Polášek	(Czech Republic) František Čermák (Slovakia) Michal Mertiňák	6–3, 7–6^{(9–7)}
2011	(Italy) Simone Bolelli (Italy) Fabio Fognini	(Croatia) Marin Čilić (Croatia) Lovro Zovko	6–3, 5–7, [10–7]
2012	(Spain) David Marrero (Spain) Fernando Verdasco	(Spain) Marcel Granollers (Spain) Marc López	6–3, 7–6^{(7–4)}
2013	(Slovakia) Martin Kližan (Spain) David Marrero (2)	(United States) Nicholas Monroe (Germany) Simon Stadler	6–1, 5–7, [10–7]
2014	(Czech Republic) František Čermák (3) (Czech Republic) Lukáš Rosol	(Serbia) Dušan Lajović (Croatia) Franko Škugor	6–4, 7–6^{(7–5)}
2015	(Argentina) Máximo González (Brazil) André Sá	(Poland) Mariusz Fyrstenberg (Mexico) Santiago González	4–6, 6–3, [10–5]
2016	(Slovakia) Martin Kližan (2) (Spain) David Marrero (3)	(Croatia) Nikola Mektić (Croatia) Antonio Šančić	6–4, 6–2
2017	(Argentina) Guillermo Durán (Argentina) Andrés Molteni	(Croatia) Marin Draganja (Croatia) Tomislav Draganja	6–3, 6–7^{(4–7)}, [10–6]
2018	(Netherlands) Robin Haase (Netherlands) Matwé Middelkoop	(Czech Republic) Roman Jebavý (Czech Republic) Jiří Veselý	6–4, 6–4
2019	(Netherlands) Robin Haase (2) (Austria) Philipp Oswald	(Austria) Oliver Marach (Austria) Jürgen Melzer	7–5, 6–7^{(2–7)}, [14–12]
2020	Not held due to COVID-19 pandemic		
2021	(Brazil) Fernando Romboli (Spain) David Vega Hernández	(Bosnia and Herzegovina) Tomislav Brkić (Serbia) Nikola Ćaćić	6–3, 7–5
2022	(Italy) Simone Bolelli (2) (Italy) Fabio Fognini (2)	(United Kingdom) Lloyd Glasspool (Finland) Harri Heliövaara	5–7, 7–6^{(8–6)}, [10–7]
2023	(Slovenia) Blaž Rola (Croatia) Nino Serdarušić	(Italy) Simone Bolelli (Italy) Andrea Vavassori	4–6, 7–6^{(7–2)}, [15–13]
2024	(Argentina) Guido Andreozzi (Mexico) Miguel Ángel Reyes-Varela	(France) Manuel Guinard (France) Gregoire Jacq	6–4, 6–2
2025	(Monaco) Romain Arneodo (France) Manuel Guinard	(United States) Patrik Trhac (United Kingdom) Marcus Willis	7–5, 7–6^{(7–2)}
2026	(Czech Republic) Adam Pavlásek (Czech Republic) Patrik Rikl	(United Kingdom) David Stevenson (United Kingdom) Marcus Willis	6−3, 4−6, [10−6]

== See also ==
- Yugoslavian International Championships
- Zagreb Indoors
- Bol Open
- Makarska International Championships
- Zagreb Open
