= Jaroslav Levinský =

Czech tennis player

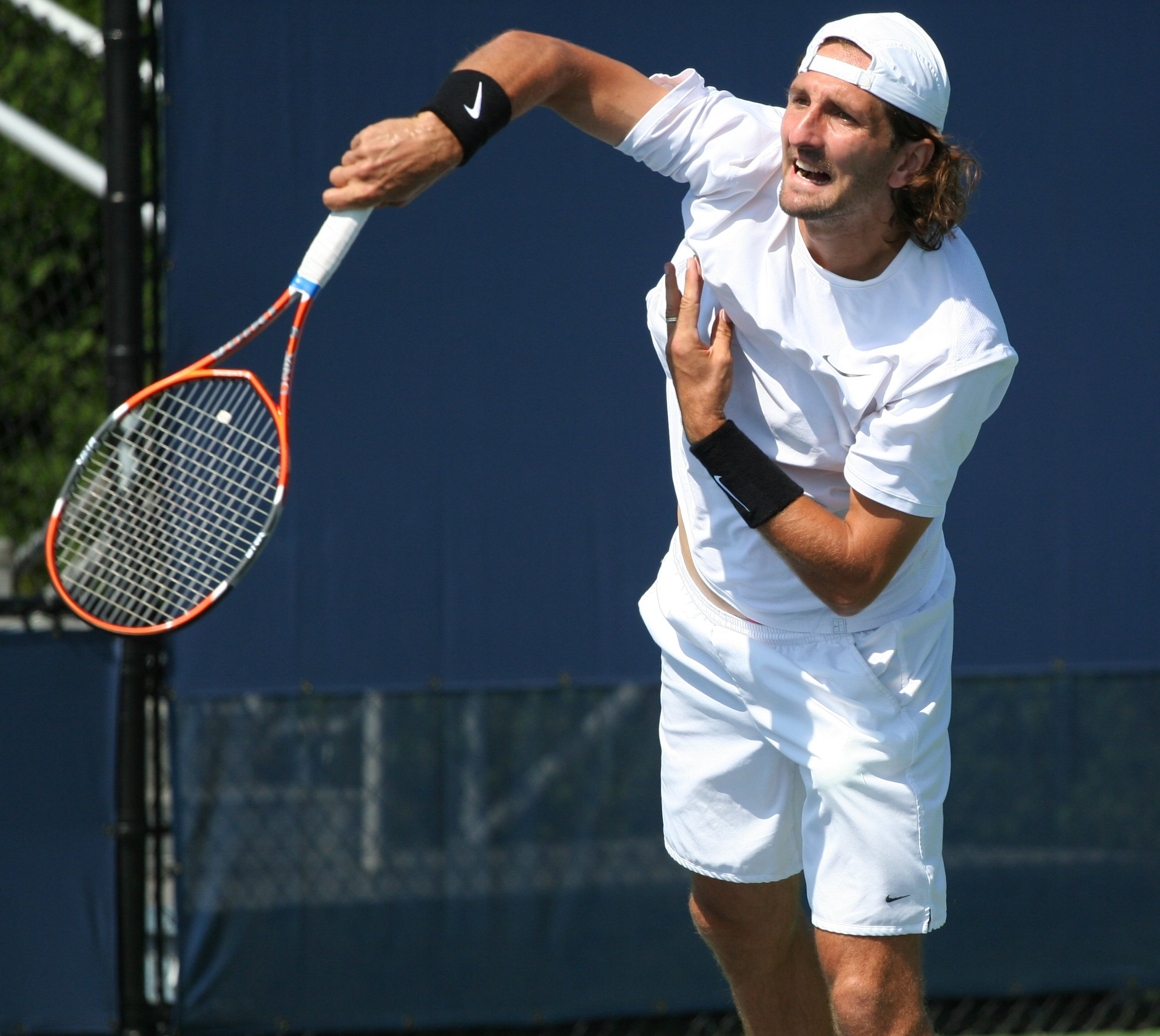
- Country (sports): Czech Republic
- Residence: Prostějov, Czech Republic
- Born: 11 February 1981 (age 44) Valašské Meziříčí, Czechoslovakia
- Height: 1.96 m (6 ft 5 in)
- Turned pro: 1999
- Retired: 2014
- Plays: Right-handed
- Coach: David Kotyza
- Prize money: US$784,970

Singles
- Career record: 0–1
- Career titles: 0; 0 Challenger, 1 Futures
- Highest ranking: No. 239 (23 September 2002)

Grand Slam singles results
- US Open: Q2 (2003)

Doubles
- Career record: 130–154
- Career titles: 5; 23 Challenger, 7 Futures
- Highest ranking: No. 24 (16 July 2007)

Grand Slam doubles results
- Australian Open: 3R (2007)
- French Open: 3R (2009)
- Wimbledon: 3R (2005, 2007)
- US Open: 3R (2009)

Mixed doubles

Grand Slam mixed doubles results
- Australian Open: F (2010)
- Wimbledon: 2R (2005, 2007, 2014)
- US Open: 1R (2014)
- Last updated on: 7 May 2021.

Jaroslav Levinský (born 11 February 1981) is a former Czech professional doubles tennis player and coach.

Levinsky reached a career-high singles ranking of World No. 239, achieved on 23 September 2002. He also reached a career-high doubles ranking of World No. 24, achieved on 16 July 2007.

Levinsky reached 6 singles finals throughout his career, with a record of 1 win and 5 losses. Additionally he reached 57 doubles finals in his career, with a record of 35 wins and 22 losses which includes a 5–10 record at the ATP Tour level and a 23–9 record in doubles finals at the ATP Challenger Tour level.

== Career ==
Levinsky's debut on the ATP Tour came in doubles, at the 2001 Croatia Open. Granted a wildcard entry alongside compatriot Daniel Vacek, they prevailed in their first round match against Italian duo Massimo Bertolini and Cristian Brandi 6–3, 6–2. They were defeated in the second round by fourth seeds and fellow Czech's Radek Štěpánek and Petr Luxa 2–6, 6–7^{(4–7)}.

Levinsky made his ATP Tour single debut at the 2003 Dutch Open, where he advanced through 3 rounds of qualifying to gain a main draw birth. He defeated Juan Giner 6–1, 5–7, 7–6^{(7–2)}, Gorka Fraile 3–6. 6–3, 6–4 and Xavier Pujo 7–6^{(7–4)}, 6–2 respectively in qualifying before losing in the first round to André Sá 2–6, 6–4, 6–7^{(2–7)}.

At the 2010 Australian Open, Levinsky reached the mixed doubles final alongside Russian WTA player Ekaterina Makarova, where they were defeated by the pairing of Cara Black and Leander Paes in straight sets 5–7, 3–6.

The last matches he played were at the 2014 US Open where he lost in the first round of both the men's doubles and mixed doubles draws.

== Coaching ==
He coached Anna Karolina Schmiedlova. He subsequently coached Kristýna Plíšková for two years, before the two parted ways in April 2021. He was also the coach of Kateryna Baindl. He is currently coaching Laslo Djere since 2023.

== Grand Slam finals ==
=== Mixed doubles: 1 (0–1) ===
Result	Year	Championship	Surface	Partner	Opponents	Score
Loss	2010	Australian Open	Hard	(Russia) Ekaterina Makarova	(Zimbabwe) Cara Black (India) Leander Paes	7–5, 6–3

== ATP career finals ==
=== Doubles: 15 (5–10) ===
Legend Grand Slam Tournaments (0–0) ATP World Tour Finals (0–0) ATP World Tour Masters 1000 (0–0) ATP World Tour 500 Series (0–0) ATP World Tour 250 Series (5–10)	Titles by surface Hard (0/2) Clay (4/4) Grass (0/0) Carpet (1/4)

Result	W/L	Date	Tournament	Surface	Partner	Opponents	Score
Win	1.	Jul 2004	Dutch Open, Amersfoort, Netherlands	Clay	(Czech Republic) David Škoch	(Argentina) José Acasuso (Peru) Luis Horna	6–0, 2–6, 7–5
Loss	1.	Jul 2004	ATP Studena Croatia Open, Umag, Croatia	Clay	(Czech Republic) David Škoch	(Argentina) José Acasuso (Brazil) Flávio Saretta	6–4, 2–6, 4–6
Loss	2.	Oct 2004	St. Petersburg Open, St. Petersburg, Russia	Carpet (i)	(Slovakia) Dominik Hrbatý	(France) Arnaud Clément (France) Michaël Llodra	3–6, 2–6
Win	2.	Feb 2006	PBZ Zagreb Indoors, Zagreb, Croatia	Carpet	(Slovakia) Michal Mertiňák	(Italy) Davide Sanguinetti (Italy) Andreas Seppi	7–6(6), 6–1
Loss	3.	Mar 2006	Tennis Channel Open, Las Vegas, United States	Hard	(Sweden) Robert Lindstedt	(United States) Bob Bryan (United States) Mike Bryan	3–6, 2–6
Win	3.	Jul 2006	Croatia Open Umag, Umag, Croatia	Clay	(Czech Republic) David Škoch	(Spain) Guillermo García López (Spain) Albert Portas	6–4, 6–4
Loss	4.	Oct 2006	Kremlin Cup, Moscow, Russia	Carpet (i)	(Czech Republic) František Čermák	(France) Fabrice Santoro (Serbia) Nenad Zimonjić	1–6, 5–7
Loss	5.	Oct 2006	Grand Prix de Tennis de Lyon, Lyon, France	Carpet (i)	(Czech Republic) František Čermák	(France) Julien Benneteau (France) Arnaud Clément	2–6, 7–6^{(7–3)}, [7–10]
Loss	6.	Feb 2007	PBZ Zagreb Indoors, Zagreb, Croatia	Carpet (i)	(Czech Republic) František Čermák	(Germany) Michael Kohlmann (Germany) Alexander Waske	6–7^{(5–7)}, 6–4, [5–10]
Loss	7.	Apr 2007	BMW Open, Munich, Germany	Clay	(Czech Republic) Jan Hájek	(Germany) Philipp Kohlschreiber (Russia) Mikhail Youzhny	1–6, 4–6
Loss	8.	Jul 2007	ATP Studena Croatia Open, Umag, Croatia	Clay	(Czech Republic) David Škoch	(Czech Republic) Lukáš Dlouhý (Slovakia) Michal Mertiňák	1–6, 1–6
Win	4.	Jul 2008	Allianz Suisse Open Gstaad, Gstaad, Switzerland	Clay	(Slovakia) Filip Polášek	(Switzerland) Stéphane Bohli (Switzerland) Stanislas Wawrinka	3–6, 6–2, [11–9]
Win	5.	Jul 2009	Catella Swedish Open, Båstad, Sweden	Clay	(Slovakia) Filip Polášek	(Sweden) Robert Lindstedt (Sweden) Robin Söderling	1–6, 6–3, [10–7]
Loss	9.	Aug 2009	Allianz Suisse Open Gstaad, Gstaad, Switzerland	Clay	(Slovakia) Filip Polášek	(Switzerland) Marco Chiudinelli (Switzerland) Michael Lammer	4–6, 4–6
Loss	10.	Sep 2009	Malaysian Open, Kuala Lumpur, Malaysia	Hard (i)	(Russia) Igor Kunitsyn	(Poland) Mariusz Fyrstenberg (Poland) Marcin Matkowski	2–6, 1–6

== ATP Challenger and ITF Futures finals ==
=== Singles: 6 (1–5) ===
Legend ATP Challenger (0–0) ITF Futures (1–5)	Finals by surface Hard (0–3) Clay (1–2) Grass (0–0) Carpet (0–0)

Result	W–L	Date	Tournament	Tier	Surface	Opponent	Score
Loss	0–1	Jun 2000	Poland F2, Zabrze	Futures	Clay	(Belgium) Dick Norman	3–6, 6–7^{(2–7)}
Loss	0–2	Nov 2000	Vietnam F1, Ho Chi Minh City	Futures	Hard	(Pakistan) Aisam Qureshi	6–3, 2–6, 3–6
Win	1–2	Jan 2001	India F2, Calcutta	Futures	Clay	(Austria) Martin Spottl	7–6^{(7–3)}, 7–6^{(7–3)}
Loss	1–3	Oct 2001	Great Britain F11, Leeds	Futures	Hard	(Croatia) Lovro Zovko	2–6, 1–6
Loss	1–4	Jan 2002	UAE F1, Abu Dhabi	Futures	Hard	(Germany) Denis Gremelmayr	walkover
Loss	1–5	May 2002	Great Britain F3, Bournemouth	Futures	Clay	(France) Richard Gasquet	3–6, 1–6

=== Doubles: 42 (30–12) ===
Legend ATP Challenger (23–9) ITF Futures (7–3)	Finals by surface Hard (18–3) Clay (12–8) Grass (0–0) Carpet (0–1)

Result	W–L	Date	Tournament	Tier	Surface	Partner	Opponents	Score
Loss	0–1	Jun 1999	Poland F1, Kraków	Futures	Clay	(Czech Republic) Pavel Šnobel	(Czech Republic) Pavel Kudrnáč (Mexico) Enrique Abaroa	3–6, 1–6
Win	1–1	Jul 2000	Italy F8, Jesi	Futures	Clay	(Czech Republic) Michal Navrátil	(Italy) Carlo Santoro (Italy) Elia Grossi	4–2, 4–1, 2–4, 4–1
Win	2–1	Oct 2000	Uzbekistan F3, Gulistan	Futures	Hard	(Slovakia) Branislav Sekáč	(France) Gwaneal Gueit (France) Sebastien Lami	3–6, 6–3, 6–2
Loss	2–2	Nov 2000	Vietnam F1, Ho Chi Minh City	Futures	Hard	(Czech Republic) Michal Navrátil	(Australia) Ashley Fisher (Pakistan) Aisam Qureshi	4–6, 4–6
Loss	2–3	Jan 2001	India F2, Calcutta	Futures	Clay	(Czech Republic) Michal Navrátil	(India) Fazaluddin Syed (Uzbekistan) Dmitriy Tomashevich	6–7^{(6–8)}, 2–6
Win	3–3	May 2001	Prague, Czech Republic	Challenger	Clay	(Czech Republic) Michal Navrátil	(Israel) Noam Behr (Israel) Andy Ram	6–3, 6–1
Loss	3–4	Aug 2001	Linz, Austria	Challenger	Clay	(Czech Republic) David Škoch	(Australia) Todd Perry (North Macedonia) Aleksandar Kitinov	6–2, 3–6, 4–6
Win	4–4	Sep 2001	Kamnik, Slovenia	Challenger	Clay	(Czech Republic) Igor Brukner	(Italy) Vincenzo Santopadre (Spain) Salvador Navarro-Gutierrez	6–3, 1–6, 6–4
Win	5–4	Oct 2001	Great Britain F11, Leeds	Futures	Hard	(Croatia) Lovro Zovko	(United Kingdom) James Nelson (United Kingdom) Simon Dickson	7–5, 6–4
Win	6–4	Oct 2001	Seoul, South Korea	Challenger	Hard	(Czech Republic) František Čermák	(Switzerland) Yves Allegro (Switzerland) Marco Chiudinelli	5–7, 7–6^{(10–8)}, 6–3
Win	7–4	Dec 2001	Bangkok, Thailand	Challenger	Hard	(Pakistan) Aisam Qureshi	(Australia) Jaymon Crabb (Australia) Peter Luczak	6–3, 6–7^{(5–7)}, 7–6^{(7–5)}
Loss	7–5	Feb 2002	Belgrade, Yugoslavia	Challenger	Carpet	(Czech Republic) Tomáš Zíb	(Federal Republic of Yugoslavia) Dušan Vemić (Croatia) Lovro Zovko	walkover
Win	8–5	May 2002	Great Britain F3, Bournemouth	Futures	Clay	(Czech Republic) Michal Navrátil	(United Kingdom) Lee Childs (United Kingdom) Mark Hilton	6–0, 6–2
Loss	8–6	May 2002	Prague, Czech Republic	Challenger	Clay	(Czech Republic) David Škoch	(Czech Republic) František Čermák (Czech Republic) Ota Fukárek	4–6, 3–6
Win	9–6	May 2002	Budapest, Hungary	Challenger	Clay	(Slovakia) Karol Beck	(Argentina) Sebastián Prieto (Argentina) Mariano Hood	3–6, 6–4, 6–1
Win	10–6	Aug 2002	St. Petersburg, Russia	Challenger	Clay	(Czech Republic) František Čermák	(Russia) Artem Derepasko (Ukraine) Orest Tereshchuk	6–3, 6–2
Win	11–6	Sep 2002	Banja Luka, Bosnia & Herzegovina	Challenger	Clay	(Russia) Yuriy Schukin	(Argentina) Juan Pablo Guzmán (Argentina) Daniel Orsanic	7–6^{(7–5)}, 7–5
Loss	11–7	Nov 2002	Reunion Island, Réunion	Challenger	Hard	(Switzerland) Marco Chiudinelli	(Argentina) Federico Browne (Israel) Jonathan Erlich	1–6, 6–4, 3–6
Win	12–7	Nov 2002	Prague II, Czech Republic	Challenger	Hard	(Slovakia) Karol Beck	(Croatia) Lovro Zovko (North Macedonia) Aleksandar Kitinov	7–5, 6–2
Win	13–7	Mar 2003	Sarajevo, Bosnia & Herzegovina	Challenger	Hard	(Czech Republic) Tomáš Berdych	(Sweden) Johan Landsberg (Sweden) Simon Aspelin	1–6, 7–6^{(8–6)}, 6–4
Win	14–7	Apr 2003	Uzbekistan F1, Qarshi	Futures	Hard	(Czech Republic) Petr Dezort	(Russia) Mikhail Elgin (Russia) Dmitry Vlasov	7–5, 6–2
Win	15–7	Apr 2003	Uzbekistan F2, Gulistan	Futures	Hard	(Czech Republic) Petr Dezort	(Ukraine) Sergiy Stakhovsky (Czech Republic) Jiri Venci	6–2, 6–2
Win	16–7	Jun 2003	Prostějov, Czech Republic	Challenger	Clay	(Czech Republic) David Škoch	(Spain) Rubén Ramírez Hidalgo (Argentina) Sergio Roitman	6–2, 6–2
Loss	16–8	Sep 2003	Szczecin, Poland	Challenger	Clay	(Czech Republic) David Škoch	(Poland) Mariusz Fyrstenberg (Poland) Marcin Matkowski	1–6, 5–7
Win	17–8	Jan 2004	UAE F1, Dubai	Futures	Hard	(Germany) Ivo Klec	(France) Julien Jeanpierre (France) Édouard Roger-Vasselin	6–4, 7–5
Win	18–8	Mar 2004	Wrexham, United Kingdom	Challenger	Hard	(Germany) Alexander Waske	(United Kingdom) Mark Hilton (United Kingdom) Jonathan Marray	7–5, 7–6^{(7–1)}
Win	19–8	Mar 2004	Sarajevo, Bosnia & Herzegovina	Challenger	Hard	(Germany) Alexander Waske	(Sweden) Johan Landsberg (Finland) Tumas Ketola	6–4, 6–1
Loss	19–9	Apr 2004	Barletta, Italy	Challenger	Clay	(Czech Republic) David Škoch	(Spain) Fernando Vicente (Spain) Marc López	6–7^{(6–8)}, 6–4, 4–6
Win	20–9	May 2004	Zagreb, Croatia	Challenger	Clay	(Slovakia) Karol Beck	(Australia) Jordan Kerr (Belgium) Tom Vanhoudt	6–2, 7–6^{(7–4)}
Win	21–9	Jun 2004	Prostějov, Czech Republic	Challenger	Clay	(Slovakia) Dominik Hrbatý	(United States) Tripp Phillips (United States) Travis Parrott	6–4, 6–4
Loss	21–10	Jun 2004	Braunschweig, Germany	Challenger	Clay	(Czech Republic) David Škoch	(Spain) Emilio Benfele Álvarez (Germany) Tomas Behrend	2–6, 7–6^{(7–3)}, 6–7^{(10–12)}
Win	22–10	Nov 2004	Dnipropetrovsk, Ukraine	Challenger	Hard	(Slovakia) Karol Beck	(Romania) Andrei Pavel (Romania) Gabriel Trifu	6–7^{(4–7)}, 7–6^{(7–4)}, 7–6^{(7–2)}
Win	23–10	Jun 2006	Prostějov, Czech Republic	Challenger	Clay	(Czech Republic) František Čermák	(Czech Republic) Michal Tabara (Czech Republic) Jan Masik	6–3, 6–2
Win	24–10	Nov 2007	Bratislava, Slovakia	Challenger	Hard	(Czech Republic) Tomáš Cibulec	(South Africa) Chris Haggard (Germany) Mischa Zverev	6–4, 2–6, [10–8]
Win	25–10	Apr 2008	Napoli, Italy	Challenger	Clay	(Czech Republic) Tomáš Cibulec	(Portugal) Fred Gil (Peru) Luis Horna	6–1, 6–3
Loss	25–11	Jul 2008	Turin, Italy	Challenger	Clay	(Czech Republic) Tomáš Cibulec	(Portugal) Fred Gil (Argentina) Carlos Berlocq	4–6, 3–6
Loss	25–12	Aug 2008	Segovia, Spain	Challenger	Hard	(Slovakia) Filip Polášek	(United Kingdom) Ross Hutchins (United States) Jim Thomas	6–7^{(3–7)}, 6–3, [8–10]
Win	26–12	Feb 2009	Beilbronn, Germany	Challenger	Hard	(Slovakia) Karol Beck	(Germany) Benedikt Dorsch (Germany) Philipp Petzschner	6–3, 6–2
Win	27–12	Mar 2009	Besançon, France	Challenger	Hard	(Slovakia) Karol Beck	(Czech Republic) David Škoch (Slovakia) Igor Zelenay	2–6, 7–5, [10–7]
Win	28–12	Mar 2009	Bergamo, Italy	Challenger	Hard	(Slovakia) Karol Beck	(Czech Republic) Pavel Vízner (South Africa) Chris Haggard	7–6^{(8–6)}, 6–4
Win	29–12	May 2009	Rhodes, Greece	Challenger	Hard	(Slovakia) Karol Beck	(United States) Bobby Reynolds (United States) Rajeev Ram	6–3, 6–3
Win	30–12	Jul 2009	Pozoblanco, Spain	Challenger	Hard	(Slovakia) Karol Beck	(United Kingdom) Ken Skupski (United Kingdom) Colin Fleming	2–6, 7–6^{(7–5)}, [10–7]

== Performance timelines ==
Key
W	F	SF	QF	#R	RR	Q#	DNQ	A	NH

(W) winner; (F) finalist; (SF) semifinalist; (QF) quarterfinalist; (#R) rounds 4, 3, 2, 1; (RR) round-robin stage; (Q#) qualification round; (DNQ) did not qualify; (A) absent; (NH) not held; (SR) strike rate (events won / competed); (W–L) win–loss record.

=== Doubles ===
Tournament	2002	2003	2004	2005	2006	2007	2008	2009	2010	2011	2012	2013	2014	SR	W–L	Win %
Grand Slam tournaments
Australian Open	A	A	A	1R	1R	3R	1R	A	1R	A	A	A	A	0 / 5	2–5	29%
French Open	A	A	1R	2R	1R	1R	1R	3R	A	A	A	1R	1R	0 / 8	3–8	27%
Wimbledon	1R	A	1R	3R	1R	3R	1R	1R	A	A	A	1R	2R	0 / 9	5–9	36%
US Open	2R	A	2R	2R	2R	1R	1R	3R	A	A	A	2R	1R	0 / 9	7–9	44%
Win–loss	1–2	0–0	1–3	4–4	1–4	4–4	0–4	4–3	0–1	0–0	0–0	1–3	1-3	0 / 31	17–31	35%
ATP World Tour Masters 1000
Indian Wells Masters	A	A	A	1R	2R	1R	A	A	A	A	A	A	A	0 / 3	1–3	25%
Miami Masters	A	A	A	A	2R	2R	A	A	A	A	A	A	A	0 / 2	2–2	50%
Monte-Carlo Masters	A	A	A	A	1R	1R	A	A	A	A	A	A	A	0 / 2	0–2	0%
Hamburg Masters	A	A	A	2R	1R	1R	A	Not Masters Series						0 / 3	1–3	25%
Rome Masters	A	A	A	A	A	2R	A	A	A	A	A	A	A	0 / 1	1–1	50%
Canada Masters	A	A	A	A	2R	A	A	A	A	A	A	A	A	0 / 1	1–1	50%
Cincinnati Masters	A	A	A	A	1R	A	A	A	A	A	A	A	A	0 / 1	0–1	0%
Paris Masters	A	A	A	A	1R	A	A	1R	A	A	A	A	A	0 / 2	0–2	0%
Win–loss	0–0	0–0	0–0	1–2	3–7	2–5	0–0	0–1	0–0	0–0	0–0	0–0	0-0	0 / 15	6–15	29%

=== Mixed doubles ===
Tournament	2005	2006	2007	2008	2009	2010	2011	2012	2013	2014	SR	W–L	Win %
Grand Slam tournaments
Australian Open	A	A	A	A	A	F	A	A	A	A	0 / 1	4–1	80%
French Open	A	A	A	A	A	A	A	A	A	A	0 / 0	0–0	–
Wimbledon	2R	1R	2R	A	A	A	A	A	1R	2R	0 / 5	3–5	38%
US Open	A	A	A	A	A	A	A	A	A	1R	0 / 1	0–1	0%
Win–loss	1–1	0–1	1–1	0–0	0–0	4–1	0–0	0–0	0–1	1–2	0 / 7	7–7	50%
