= ITC Stella Maris =

Tennis venue in Umag, Croatia

ATP Stadium Goran Ivanišević
- ITC Stella Maris
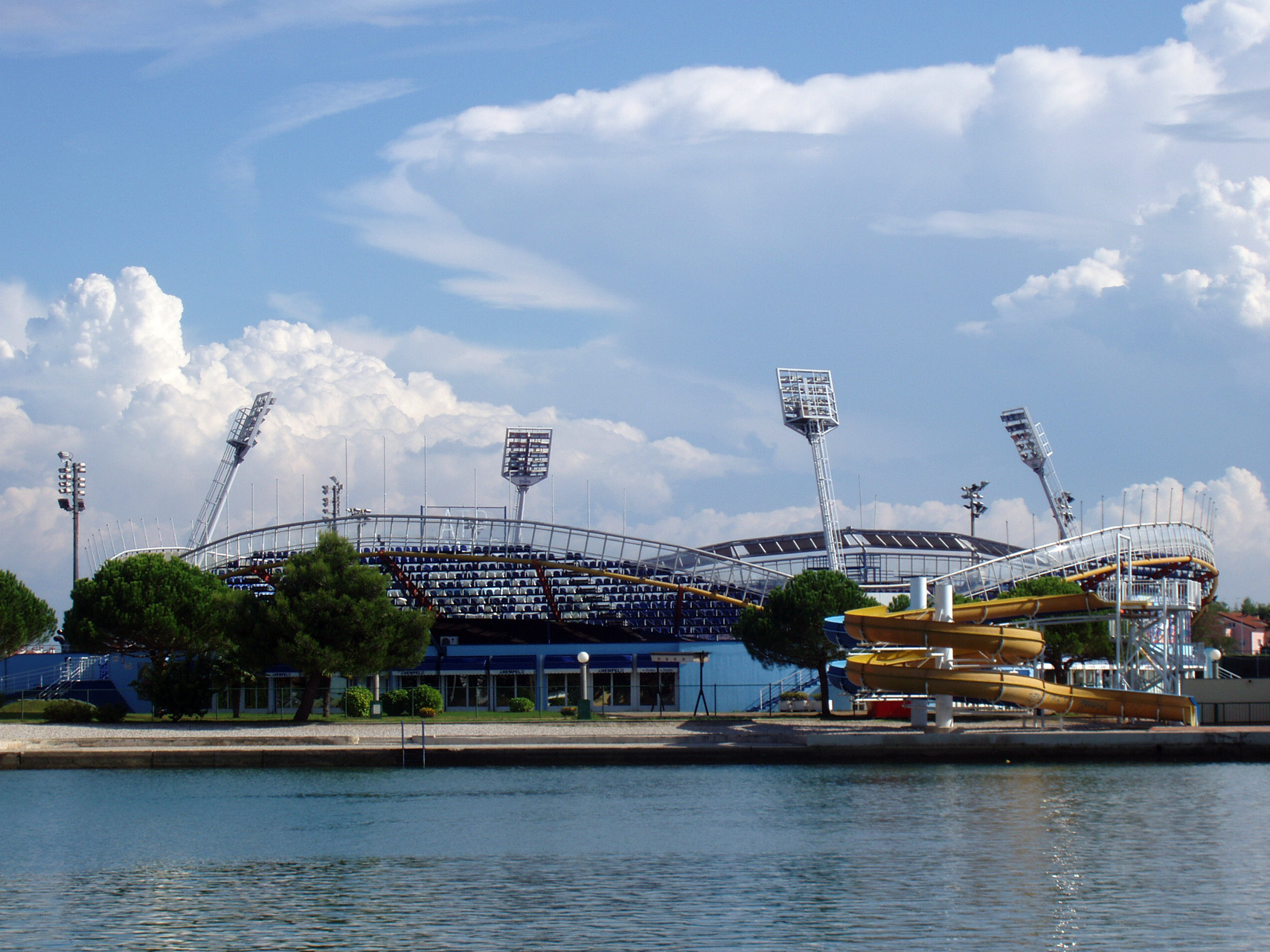
- Full name: ATP stadium Goran Ivanišević
- Former names: ITC Stella Maris (1990–2016)
- Location: Umag; Croatia
- Capacity: 4,000 (tennis)
- Surface: Clay court

Construction
- Opened: 1990

Tenants
- Croatia Open Umag (250 series) (Tennis) (1990–present)

The Stadium Goran Ivanišević (formerly ITC Stella Maris) is a tennis venue in Umag, Croatia. The complex is the host of the annual 250 series stop, the Croatia Open. The stadium court has a capacity of 4,000 people. The stadium was called "ITC Stella Maris" until 2016, when it was renamed after Goran Ivanišević - Croatian professional tennis player, who won 2001 Wimbledon Championship but has not won the Croatian Open.

Jannik Sinner, Carlos Alcaraz, Thomas Muster, Stan Wawrinka, Carlos Moya, Tommy Robredo, Juan Carlos Ferrero, Marcelo Rios, Fabio Fognini, Dominic Thiem, as well as Goran's student Marin Čilić, lifted the winning trophy. The list of greats who have bowed down on the Umag soil is: Rafael Nadal, Novak Djokovic, Juan Martin Del Potro, Gustavo Kuerten, Sergi Bruguera, David Ferrer and Gaël Monfils - just like Goran, they did not live to hear "What a Wonderful World", the unofficial anthem sung at the closing of every tournament, play in their honor.

== History ==
The stadium was built in 1990, and since then the venue serves as the home of the Croatia Open in Umag, Istria as one of the region’s most recognised tennis tournaments. The architect of the stadium is Marjan Videc. Over the years, the stadium has become an important sporting and entertainment destination on the Adriatic coast. The architecture of the main stadium court was inspired by the shape of a seashell. In addition to the central court, the complex includes several outdoor courts used for professional tournaments, training sessions, and recreational play. Beyond tennis, the venue also hosts concerts, cultural events, and live performances ranging from classical productions to modern music events.

== Facilities and Amenities ==
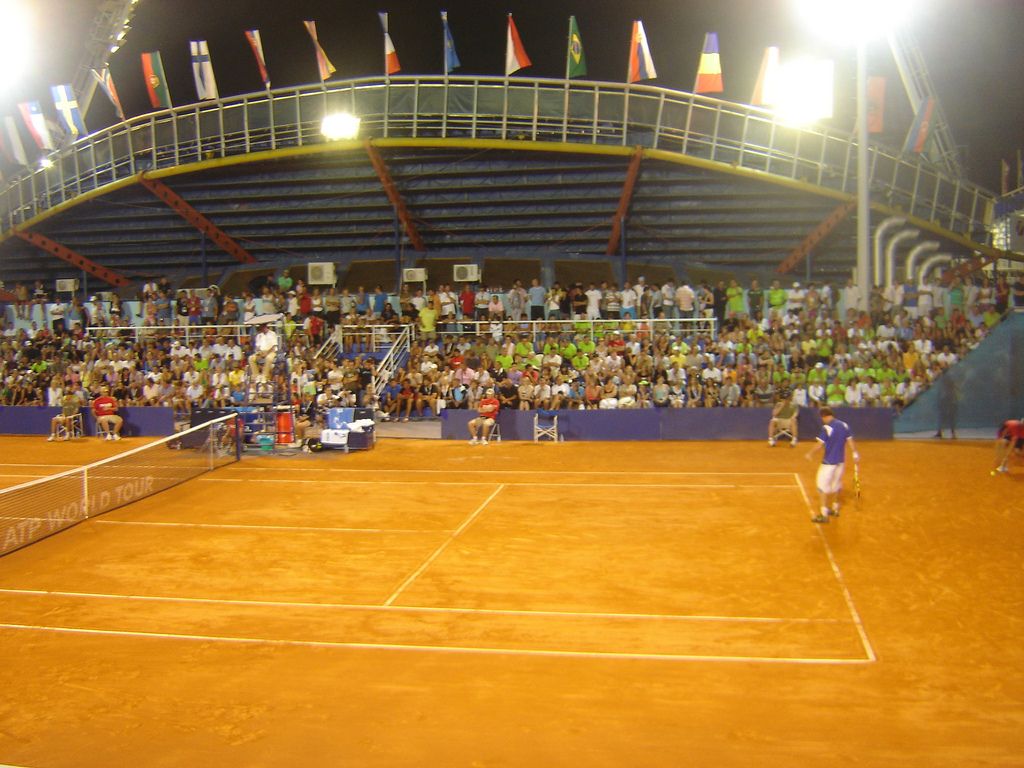
Inside the stadium, during a match

Stadium is designed as a complete sports and recreation centre, offering a wide range of facilities and amenities for athletes, teams, and visitors of all experience levels. The complex is equipped with modern training areas, specialised sports equipment, and spaces suitable for both individual and group activities. Whether preparing for professional competition or focusing on personal fitness, visitors can access programs tailored to different goals and skill levels.

The centre regularly organises training sessions, team practices, tournaments, and fitness programs, while experienced coaches and trainers are available to provide professional support and guidance. Personalised training options and general conditioning programs are also offered for recreational users looking to improve their health and performance.

To ensure comfort and convenience, the venue provides additional amenities including lounge areas, locker rooms, showers, and parking facilities. The entire complex is carefully maintained to create a safe, clean, and welcoming environment for all guests. Regular inspections and maintenance procedures help ensure that all facilities and equipment remain in excellent condition and fully compliant with safety standards. Combining world-class tennis infrastructure with modern recreational amenities, ATP Stadion Goran Ivanišević continues to be a key sports destination in Croatia, attracting both professional athletes and visitors from around the world.

== See also ==
- List of tennis stadiums by capacity
