= Marc Marco Ripoll =

Spanish photographer and tennis player

- Country (sports): Spain
- Born: 20 January 1981 (age 44)
- Prize money: $18,669

Singles
- Highest ranking: No. 471 (24 June 2002)

Doubles
- Career record: 0–4 (ATP Tour)
- Highest ranking: No. 772 (9 July 2001)

Marc Marco Ripoll (born 20 January 1981) is a Spanish photographer and former professional tennis player. He was a finalist in the Weather Photographer of the Year award for 2020.

Ripoll reached a career high singles ranking of 471 in the world, competing mostly in satellite and ITF Futures events. He made four ATP Tour main draw appearances as a doubles player. On debut at the 1999 Majorca Open he partnered with Feliciano López and for his three other tournaments he teamed up with Carlos Moyá.

A former hitting partner of Sabine Lisicki, Ripoll now coaches tennis on the island of Majorca.
