= Andrés Schneiter =

Argentine tennis player and coach

- Country (sports): Argentina
- Born: 8 April 1976 (age 49) Buenos Aires, Argentina
- Turned pro: 1994
- Retired: 2004
- Plays: Right-handed (one-handed backhand)
- Prize money: $218,536

Singles
- Career record: 0–1
- Career titles: 0; 0 Challenger, 4 Futures
- Highest ranking: No. 219 (21 September 1998)

Grand Slam singles results
- French Open: Q2 (1998, 1999)

Doubles
- Career record: 24–40
- Career titles: 2; 10 Challenger, 4 Futures
- Highest ranking: No. 62 (31 March 2003)

Grand Slam doubles results
- Australian Open: 1R (2001, 2002, 2003)
- French Open: 3R (2002)
- Wimbledon: 1R (2001, 2002, 2003)
- US Open: 2R (2001)

Grand Slam mixed doubles results
- Australian Open: 1R (2003)
- Wimbledon: 1R (2001, 2002, 2003)

Andrés Schneiter (born 8 April 1976) is an Argentine tennis coach and a former professional player. His career-high ATP singles ranking was world No. 219 in 1998 and No. 62 in doubles in 2003. He is currently coaching Daniel Vallejo.

== Playing career ==
On the futures tour, Schneiter won four singles titles, three on clay and the other on carpet.

He was a doubles specialist who won two doubles titles with Sergio Roitman at Amsterdam in 2000 and at Umag in 2001. Schneiter was a runner up at Bucharest in 2002 with Emilio Benfele Álvarez. His best Grand Slam doubles result was reaching the third round of the French Open with Sergio Roitman. Schneiter retired in 2004.

== Coaching career ==
Schneiter was the former coach of Mariano Puerta and was his coach when Puerta reached the 2005 French Open final, where Puerta tested positive for drugs.

He later coached Cristian Garín to four ATP titles whom he was coaching together with Juan Ignacio Londero, Federico Coria and Emilio Gómez. In July 2025, Schneiter started coaching Paraguayan Daniel Vallejo.

== ATP career finals ==
=== Doubles: 3 (2 titles, 1 runner-up) ===
| Legend (doubles) Grand Slam (0–0) ATP World Tour Finals (0–0) ATP Masters Series (0–0) ATP Championship Series (0–0) ATP World Series (2–1) | Finals by surface Hard (0–0) Clay (2–1) Grass (0–0) Carpet (0–0) | Finals by setting Outdoor (2–1) Indoor (0–0) |

| Result | W–L | Date | Tournament | Tier | Surface | Partner | Opponents | Score |
|---|---|---|---|---|---|---|---|---|
| Win | 1–0 | Jul 2000 | Amsterdam, Netherlands | World Series | Clay | (Argentina) Sergio Roitman | (Netherlands) Edwin Kempes (Netherlands) Dennis van Scheppingen | 4–6, 6–4, 6–1 |
| Win | 2–0 | Jul 2001 | Umag, Croatia | World Series | Clay | (Argentina) Sergio Roitman | (Croatia) Ivan Ljubičić (Croatia) Lovro Zovko | 6–2, 7–5 |
| Loss | 2–1 | Sep 2002 | Bucharest, Romania | World Series | Clay | (Spain) Emilio Benfele Álvarez | (Germany) Jens Knippschild (Sweden) Peter Nyborg | 3–6, 3–6 |

== ATP Challenger and ITF Futures finals ==
=== Singles: 4 (4–0) ===
| Legend ATP Challenger (0–0) ITF Futures (4–0) | Finals by surface Hard (0–0) Clay (4–0) Grass (0–0) Carpet (0–0) |

| Result | W–L | Date | Tournament | Tier | Surface | Opponent | Score |
|---|---|---|---|---|---|---|---|
| Win | 1–0 | Jun 1998 | Poland F1, Kraków | Futures | Clay | (Poland) Bartłomiej Dąbrowski | 7–5, 6–4 |
| Win | 2–0 | Jul 1998 | Germany F12, Kassel | Futures | Clay | (Italy) Stefano Cobolli | 6–0, 4–6, 6–4 |
| Win | 3–0 | Jul 1998 | Spain F1, Albufereta | Futures | Clay | (Spain) Juan Giner | 6–3, 6–0 |
| Win | 4–0 | Sep 1999 | Spain F9, Oviedo | Futures | Clay | (Spain) Javier Garcia-Sintes | 6–3, 6–1 |

=== Doubles: 29 (14–15) ===
| Legend ATP Challenger (10–8) ITF Futures (4–7) | Finals by surface Hard (0–0) Clay (14–15) Grass (0–0) Carpet (0–0) |

| Result | W–L | Date | Tournament | Tier | Surface | Partner | Opponents | Score |
|---|---|---|---|---|---|---|---|---|
| Loss | 0–1 | Jun 1998 | Italy F9, Valdengo | Futures | Clay | (Switzerland) Fabio Massetta | (France) Nicolas Kischkewitz (France) Guillaume Marx | 1–6, 2–6 |
| Win | 1–1 | Sep 1998 | Santa Cruz, Bolivia | Challenger | Clay | (Argentina) Marcelo Charpentier | (Venezuela) Kepler Orellana (Venezuela) Jimy Szymanski | 6–2, 6–1 |
| Loss | 1–2 | May 1999 | Argentina F2, Córdoba, Argentina | Futures | Clay | (Argentina) Marcelo Charpentier | (Argentina) Guillermo Coria (Argentina) David Nalbandian | 1–6, 0–6 |
| Loss | 1–3 | May 1999 | Argentina F3, Córdoba, Argentina | Futures | Clay | (Argentina) Marcelo Charpentier | (Argentina) Ignacio González King (Brazil) Alexandre Simoni | 5–7, 2–6 |
| Loss | 1–4 | May 1999 | Germany F2, Schwäbisch Hall | Futures | Clay | (Brazil) Ricardo Schlachter | (Uzbekistan) Oleg Ogorodov (Belarus) Vladimir Voltchkov | 3–6, 6–4, 6–7 |
| Win | 2–4 | Aug 1999 | Spain F7, Irun | Futures | Clay | (Argentina) Marcello Wowk | (France) Julien Jeanpierre (Spain) Carlos Martinez-Comet | 7–6, 7–5 |
| Loss | 2–5 | Nov 1999 | Argentina F4, Rosario | Futures | Clay | (Argentina) Enzo Artoni | (Argentina) Guillermo Coria (Argentina) David Nalbandian | 1–6, 7–6, 4–6 |
| Loss | 2–6 | Nov 1999 | Argentina F5, Lanús | Futures | Clay | (Argentina) Enzo Artoni | (Brazil) Marcos Daniel (Brazil) Ricardo Schlachter | 6–7, 7–6, 3–6 |
| Win | 3–6 | Nov 1999 | Chile F4, Santiago | Futures | Clay | (Argentina) Enzo Artoni | (Chile) Hermes Gamonal (Brazil) Leandro Rosa | 7–6, 6–4 |
| Win | 4–6 | Mar 2000 | Argentina F1, Mendoza | Futures | Clay | (Argentina) Enzo Artoni | (Argentina) Leonardo Olguín (Argentina) José Acasuso | 6–1, 6–3 |
| Loss | 4–7 | Jun 2000 | Germany F7, Trier | Futures | Clay | (Uzbekistan) Dmitriy Tomashevich | (Germany) Boris Bachert (Germany) Lars Uebel | 6–4, 4–6, 5–7 |
| Win | 5–7 | Aug 2000 | Sopot, Poland | Challenger | Clay | (Argentina) Sergio Roitman | (Spain) Oscar Hernandez (Spain) Germán Puentes Alcañiz | 6–4, 6–2 |
| Win | 6–7 | Sep 2000 | Budapest, Hungary | Challenger | Clay | (Argentina) Sergio Roitman | (Czech Republic) David Miketa (Czech Republic) David Škoch | 6–3, 6–3 |
| Loss | 6–8 | Nov 2000 | Buenos Aires, Argentina | Challenger | Clay | (Argentina) Sergio Roitman | (Argentina) Lucas Arnold Ker (Argentina) Pablo Albano | 3–6, 6–4, 2–6 |
| Win | 7–8 | May 2001 | Zagreb, Croatia | Challenger | Clay | (Argentina) Enzo Artoni | (North Macedonia) Aleksandar Kitinov (Brazil) Alexandre Simoni | 6–7^{(5–7)}, 6–4, 6–4 |
| Win | 8–8 | Jun 2001 | Biella, Italy | Challenger | Clay | (Argentina) Enzo Artoni | (Italy) Massimo Bertolini (Italy) Cristian Brandi | 7–6^{(7–5)}, 4–6, 6–1 |
| Loss | 8–9 | Jul 2001 | Budaörs, Hungary | Challenger | Clay | (Argentina) Sergio Roitman | (Czech Republic) Petr Dezort (Czech Republic) Radomír Vašek | 3–6, 7–5, 6–7^{(6–8)} |
| Loss | 8–10 | Aug 2001 | Ribeirão Preto, Brazil | Challenger | Clay | (Argentina) Sergio Roitman | (Brazil) Adriano Ferreira (Brazil) Antonio Prieto | 1–6, 7–6^{(8–6)}, 4–6 |
| Win | 9–10 | Apr 2002 | Tunis, Tunisia | Challenger | Clay | (Spain) Álex López Morón | (United States) Devin Bowen (Australia) Ashley Fisher | 6–4, 7–6^{(8–6)} |
| Loss | 9–11 | May 2002 | Rome, Italy | Challenger | Clay | (Argentina) Sergio Roitman | (Romania) Gabriel Trifu (Belarus) Vladimir Voltchkov | 1–6, 2–6 |
| Loss | 9–12 | Jun 2002 | Weiden, Germany | Challenger | Clay | (Argentina) Sergio Roitman | (Germany) Jens Knippschild (Socialist Federal Republic of Yugoslavia) Dušan Vemić | 6–7^{(5–7)}, 2–6 |
| Loss | 9–13 | Aug 2002 | Geneva, Switzerland | Challenger | Clay | (Bulgaria) Orlin Stanoytchev | (Romania) Victor Hănescu (Argentina) Leonardo Olguín | 6–1, 4–6, 4–6 |
| Win | 10–13 | Sep 2002 | Aschaffenburg, Germany | Challenger | Clay | (Argentina) Diego del Río | (Hungary) Kornél Bardóczky (Hungary) Zoltán Nagy | 6–3, 3–6, 6–3 |
| Win | 11–13 | Sep 2002 | Szczecin, Poland | Challenger | Clay | (Argentina) José Acasuso | (Czech Republic) Leoš Friedl (Czech Republic) David Škoch | 6–4, 7–5 |
| Win | 12–13 | Mar 2003 | Cagliari, Italy | Challenger | Clay | (Spain) Álex López Morón | (Spain) Juan Ignacio Carrasco (Spain) Albert Portas | 5–7, 6–4, 7–5 |
| Loss | 12–14 | May 2003 | Košice, Slovakia | Challenger | Clay | (Spain) Álex López Morón | (Australia) Stephen Huss (South Africa) Myles Wakefield | 4–6, 3–6 |
| Loss | 12–15 | Jun 2003 | Lugano, Switzerland | Challenger | Clay | (Spain) Álex López Morón | (Spain) Juan-Manuel Balcells (Spain) Juan-Albert Viloca-Puig | 4–6, 4–6 |
| Win | 13–15 | Aug 2003 | Geneva, Switzerland | Challenger | Clay | (Spain) Álex López Morón | (Germany) Philipp Petzschner (Spain) Emilio Benfele Álvarez | 6–4, 5–7, 7–6^{(9–7)} |
| Win | 14–15 | Nov 2003 | Argentina F6, Buenos Aires | Futures | Clay | (Argentina) Gustavo Marcaccio | (Argentina) Diego del Río (Argentina) Sebastián Prieto | 6–2, 6–7^{(2–7)}, 6–4 |

== Performance timelines ==
Key
| W | F | SF | QF | #R | RR | Q# | DNQ | A | NH |

(W) winner; (F) finalist; (SF) semifinalist; (QF) quarterfinalist; (#R) rounds 4, 3, 2, 1; (RR) round-robin stage; (Q#) qualification round; (DNQ) did not qualify; (A) absent; (NH) not held; (SR) strike rate (events won / competed); (W–L) win–loss record.

=== Doubles ===
| Tournament | 2001 | 2002 | 2003 | SR | W–L | Win % |
|---|---|---|---|---|---|---|
Grand Slam tournaments
| Australian Open | 1R | 1R | 1R | 0 / 3 | 0–3 | 0% |
| French Open | 1R | 3R | 1R | 0 / 3 | 2–3 | 40% |
| Wimbledon | 1R | 1R | 1R | 0 / 3 | 0–3 | 0% |
| US Open | 2R | 1R | 1R | 0 / 3 | 1–3 | 25% |
| Win–loss | 1–4 | 2–4 | 0–4 | 0 / 12 | 3–12 | 20% |
