= Mario Radić (tennis player) =

Croatian tennis player (born 1982)

- Full name: Mario Radić
- Country (sports): Croatia
- Born: 14 January 1982 (age 43); Split, SR Croatia
- Height: 6 ft 2 in (188 cm)
- Plays: Right-handed
- Prize money: $101,843

Singles
- Career record: 2–4
- Career titles: 0
- Highest ranking: No. 141 (5 August 2002)

Doubles
- Career record: 0–3
- Career titles: 0
- Highest ranking: No. 207 (9 December 2002)

Mario Radić (born 14 January 1982) is a former professional tennis player from Croatia.

== Biography ==
Radić' was born in the Croatian city of Split and developed his tennis under the tutelage of famed coach Pato Álvarez in Barcelona, Spain. He later moved to the Veneto region of Italy where he remained based. He was a member of the Croatian team that were runners-up to Spain in the 1998 Junior Davis Cup.

Turning professional in 2000, Radić competed mostly on the Challenger circuit, with the occasional main draw appearance on the ATP Tour. His highest ranking, 141 in the world, was attained in 2002. At a Challenger tournament in Texas in 2002 he had a win over Michael Chang. He twice made the second round of the ATP Tour tournament in Umag, in both 2002 and 2003. In 2003 he also defeated František Čermák to win the Banja Luka Challenger and in the same year won the doubles event at the Brindisi Challenger, with Iván Navarro. He was a member of the Croatian Davis Cup squad for their 2003 World Group quarter-final.

He lives with his wife and children in Spinea, Italy.

== Challenger titles ==
=== Singles: (1) ===
No.	Year	Tournament	Surface	Opponent	Score
1.	2003	Banja Luka, Bosnia & Herzegovina	Clay	(Czech Republic) František Čermák	6–4, 6–3

=== Doubles: (1) ===
No.	Year	Tournament	Surface	Partner	Opponents	Score
1.	2003	Brindisi, Italy	Clay	(Spain) Iván Navarro	(Italy) Manuel Jorquera (Argentina) Diego Moyano	7–6^{(10–8)}, 6–0
