= Carlos Moyá =

Spanish tennis player (born 1976)

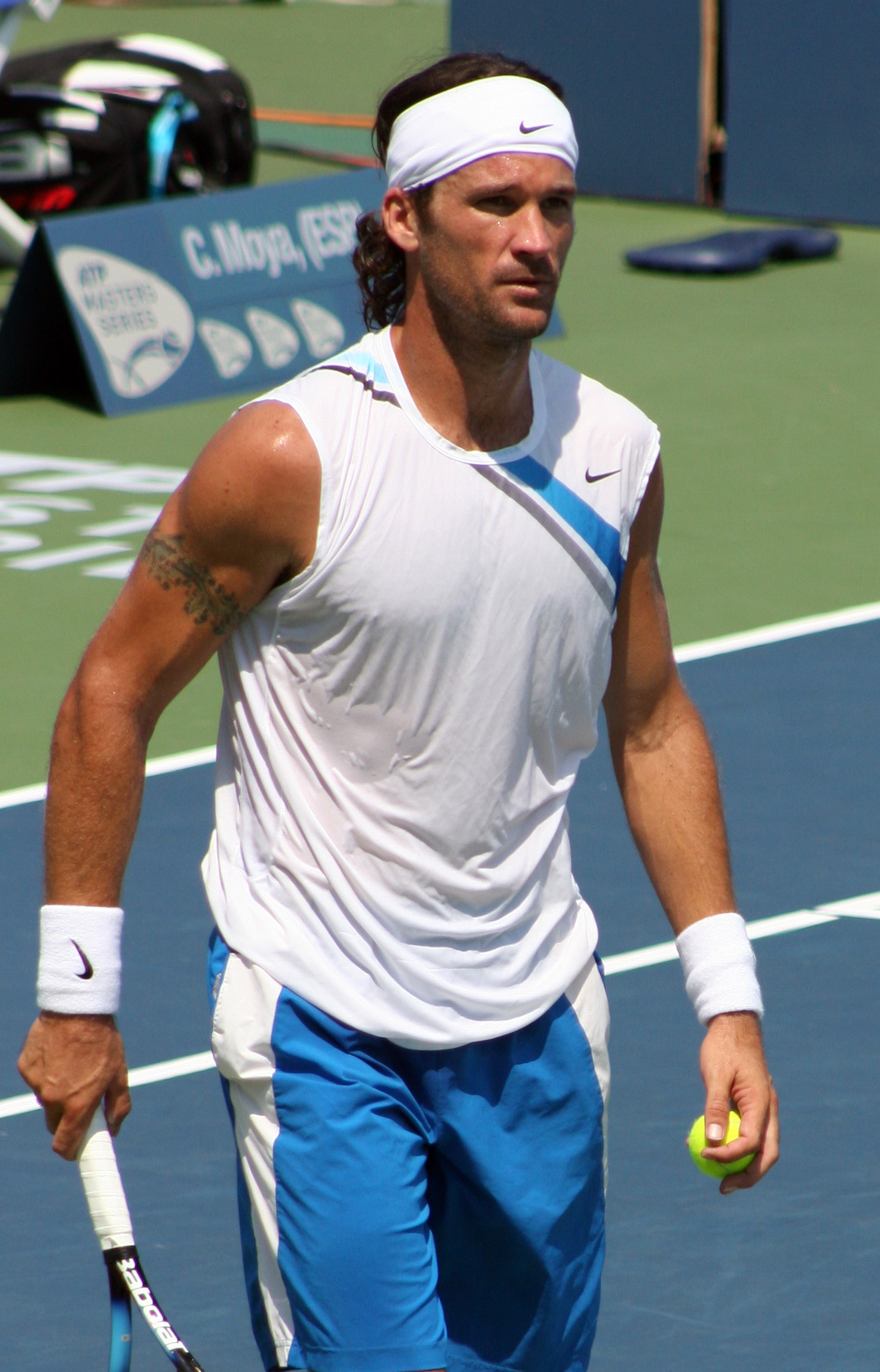
- Moyá at the 2007 Cincinnati Masters|2007 Cincinnati Open
- Country (sports): Spain
- Residence: Madrid, Spain
- Born: 27 August 1976 (age 50) Palma, Mallorca, Spain
- Height: 1.91 m (6 ft 3 in)
- Turned pro: 1995
- Retired: 17 November 2010
- Plays: Right-handed (two-handed backhand)
- Prize money: US$13,443,970

Singles
- Career record: 575–319 (64.3%)
- Career titles: 20
- Highest ranking: No. 1 (15 March 1999)

Grand Slam singles results
- Australian Open: F (1997)
- French Open: W (1998)
- Wimbledon: 4R (2004)
- US Open: SF (1998)

Other tournaments
- Tour Finals: F (1998)
- Olympic Games: QF (2004)

Doubles
- Career record: 24–50 (32.4%)
- Career titles: 0
- Highest ranking: No. 108 (29 October 2001)

Grand Slam doubles results
- Australian Open: QF (2001)

Mixed doubles
- Career record: 0–1
- Career titles: 0

Grand Slam mixed doubles results
- Australian Open: 1R (2006)

Team competitions
- Davis Cup: W (2004)

Coaching career (2016–2024)
- Milos Raonic (2016); Rafael Nadal (2016-2024)

Coaching achievements
- Coachee singles titles total: 21
- List of notable tournaments (with champion) 1x Australian Open (Nadal); 5x French Open (Nadal); 2x US Open (Nadal); 8x ATP World Tour Masters 1000 (Nadal)

Carlos Moyá Llompart (Spanish: [ˈkaɾlos moˈʝa ʎomˈpaɾt]; born 27 August 1976) is a Spanish former professional tennis player and coach. He was ranked as the world No. 1 in men's singles by the Association of Tennis Professionals (ATP), achieved in 1999. Moyá won 20 ATP Tour-level singles titles, including a major at the 1998 French Open, and was part of the victorious Spanish Davis Cup team in 2004. He was also the runner-up at the 1997 Australian Open. After his playing career, Moyá served as Rafael Nadal's primary coach from 2016 to 2024.

== Tennis career ==
In November 1995, at the age of 19, Moyá won his first tournament at the top-level in Buenos Aires, defeating Félix Mantilla in the final. In May 1996, Moyá defeated the clay-court champion Thomas Muster, in the semifinals of the tournament in Munich, ending Muster's streak of winning 38 matches in a row on clay-courts. It was the fourth time in four weeks that Moyá had played a match against Muster. In the final of Munich, Sláva Doseděl defeated Moyá.

In 1997, Moyá reached his first Grand Slam final at the Australian Open, defeating defending champion Boris Becker in the first round, Jonas Björkman in the fourth round, and world No. 3 Michael Chang in the semifinals, in straight sets, before losing in straight sets to Pete Sampras. Before the US Open, he won brilliantly in Long Island. His opponent in the final was the future winner of US Open a few days later, the Australian Patrick Rafter. Moyá lost due to an injury in the first round of the US Open.

In 1998, Moyá won the French Open. He defeated Sébastien Grosjean, Pepe Imaz, Andrew Ilie and Jens Knippschild before beating the tournament favourite, Marcelo Ríos in the quarterfinal. He then defeated Félix Mantilla Botella in the semifinal and fellow-Spaniard Álex Corretja in the final with a straight-sets win. He also won his first Tennis Masters Series tournament that year at Monte Carlo. He reached the semifinals of the US Open, losing to Mark Philippoussis. He concluded the year by finishing runner-up at the ATP World Championships (now known as the ATP World Tour Finals), where he lost in a five-set final to Corretja, having won the first two sets.

In March 1999, after finishing runner-up at Indian Wells, Moyá reached the world No. 1 singles ranking, the first Spanish player in history to achieve this feat. He held the top spot for two weeks. Later that year, he entered the French Open as defending champion and lost in the fourth round to eventual winner Andre Agassi. At the US Open, Moyá withdrew in the second round with a back injury and only played in two tournaments for the rest of the year.

Despite being hampered with a stress fracture in his lower back from the 1999 US Open through the early part of 2000, Moyá still finished in the top 50 in the world for the fifth straight year. He reached the fourth round of the 2000 US Open, where he held a match point in the fourth set, but eventually lost to Todd Martin in five sets. Moyá's best result for the rest of 2000 was winning at the Portugal Open final over his countryman Francisco Clavet.

In 2001, Moyá won the title at Umag. He also finished runner-up at Barcelona, where he lost in a four-hour marathon final to countryman Juan Carlos Ferrero.

2002 saw Moyá win four titles from six finals. He captured his second career Tennis Masters Series title, and the biggest hard-court title of his career, at Cincinnati, where he defeated world No. 1, Lleyton Hewitt, in the final.

Moyá captured three clay-court titles in 2003. He also helped Spain reach the final of the Davis Cup, compiling a 6–0 singles record. In the semifinals, he won the deciding rubber against Gastón Gaudio as Spain beat Argentina, 3–2. He beat Mark Philippoussis on grass in the final. But that proved to be Spain's only point, as they lost the final 1–4 to Australia.

In 2004, Moyá helped Spain go one better and win the Davis Cup. In the final, he won two critical singles rubbers against Andy Roddick and Mardy Fish, as Spain beat the United States 3–2. The year also saw Moyà capture his third career Masters Series title at Rome, where he defeated David Nalbandian in the final. He was the only player on the tour to win at least 20 matches on both clay courts and hardcourts that year.

In July 2004, Moyá's kind-hearted gesture to hit with ball boy Sandeep Ponniah at the 2004 Tennis Masters Series Toronto event captured audiences during an injury timeout against opponent Nicolas Kiefer of Germany. To the crowd's surprise, Ponniah shuffled Moyá across the baseline and received an ovation for an overhead smash on a Moyá lob.

Moyá won his 18th career title in January 2005 at Chennai. He donated his prize money for the win to the 2004 Indian Ocean Earthquake and Tsunami victims.

In January 2007, Moyá was the runner-up at the Sydney International, losing to defending champion James Blake.

In May 2007, at the Hamburg Masters, he defeated Mardy Fish, world No. 12 Tomáš Berdych, world No. 9 Blake, and world No. 6 Novak Djokovic, a run which saw him reach his first Masters semifinal since 2004 Indian Wells, where he lost to Roger Federer.

Moyá lost against Rafael Nadal in straight sets in the quarterfinals of the 2007 French Open.

During Wimbledon, Moyá lost in the first round to Tim Henman in a five-set thriller, the fifth set stretching to 24 games (Henman won 13–11). Despite the loss, Moyá had no points to defend (he had not played a grass-court match in a few years), resulting in his moving to world No. 20, his first time inside the top 20 since 13 June 2005.

In July 2007, Moyá won the Croatia Open in Umag, defeating Andrei Pavel. The win brought him to world No. 18 in the rankings, his highest rank since 23 May 2005, when he was world No. 15. In 2007 at Cincinnati, he reached the quarter-finals, where he lost to Lleyton Hewitt.

In 2008 at the Cincinnati Masters, Moyá defeated Nikolay Davydenko, the match being played over the course of two days because of rain. Hours after his match with Davydenko, Moyá beat Igor Andreev.

Moyá made a slow start in 2009. He failed to progress beyond the second round of his first four tournaments, including a first-round loss at the Australian Open. In March 2009, he announced that he would have an indefinite hiatus from tennis to recover from injured tendons and ischium in his hip. He returned to professional tennis in January 2010, losing against Janko Tipsarević in the first round of the Chennai Open, then losing in the first round of the 2010 Australian Open to Illya Marchenko.

On 17 November 2010, he announced his retirement from tennis owing to a long-standing foot injury from which he failed to recover. He received a special ceremony at the O2 Arena in London during the 2010 ATP World Tour Finals, with all top eight singles and doubles players attending. Other players who attended included Fernando Verdasco, Mikhail Youzhny, Àlex Corretja, Jonas Björkman, and Thomas Johansson.

He has won ATP Tour singles titles in eleven countries: Argentina, Croatia, France, Italy, India, Mexico, Monaco, Portugal, Spain, Sweden, and the United States.

== Major finals ==
=== Grand Slam finals ===
==== Singles: 2 (1–1) ====
Result	Date	Tournament	Surface	Opponent	Score
Loss	1997	Australian Open	Hard	(United States) Pete Sampras	2–6, 3–6, 3–6
Win	1998	French Open	Clay	(Spain) Àlex Corretja	6–3, 7–5, 6–3

=== Year-end championships finals ===
==== Singles: 1 (1 title) ====
Result	Date	Tournament	Surface	Opponent	Score
Loss	1998	ATP Championships	Hard (i)	(Spain) Àlex Corretja	6–3, 6–3, 5–7, 3–6, 5–7

=== Masters Series finals ===
==== Singles: 6 (3–3) ====
Result	Date	Tournament	Surface	Opponent	Score
Win	1998	Monte Carlo	Clay	(France) Cédric Pioline	6–3, 6–0, 7–5
Loss	1999	Indian Wells	Hard	(Australia) Mark Philippoussis	7–5, 4–6, 4–6, 6–4, 2–6
Loss	2002	Monte Carlo	Clay	(Spain) Juan Carlos Ferrero	5–7, 3–6, 4–6
Win	2002	Cincinnati	Hard	(Australia) Lleyton Hewitt	7–5, 7–6^{(7–5)}
Loss	2003	Miami	Hard	(United States) Andre Agassi	3–6, 3–6
Win	2004	Rome	Clay	(Argentina) David Nalbandian	6–3, 6–3, 6–1

== ATP career finals ==
=== Singles: 44 (20 titles, 24 runner-ups) ===
Legend Grand Slam tournaments (1–1) Tennis Masters Cup (0–1) ATP Masters Series (3–3) ATP International Series Gold (3–4) ATP International Series (13–15)	Finals by surface Hard (4–12) Grass (0–0) Clay (16–12) Carpet (0–0)

Result	W/L	Date	Tournament	Surface	Opponent	Score
Win	1.	Nov 1995	Buenos Aires, Argentina	Clay	(Spain) Félix Mantilla	6–0, 6–3
Loss	1.	May 1996	Munich, Germany	Clay	(Czech Republic) Sláva Doseděl	4–6, 6–4, 3–6
Win	2.	Aug 1996	Umag, Croatia	Clay	(Spain) Félix Mantilla	6–0, 7–6^{(7–4)}
Loss	2.	Sep 1996	Bucharest, Romania	Clay	(Spain) Alberto Berasategui	1–6, 6–7^{(5–7)}
Loss	3.	Jan 1997	Sydney, Australia	Hard	(United Kingdom) Tim Henman	3–6, 1–6
Loss	4.	Jan 1997	Australian Open	Hard	(United States) Pete Sampras	2–6, 3–6, 3–6
Loss	5.	Aug 1997	Amsterdam, Netherlands	Clay	(Czech Republic) Sláva Doseděl	6–7^{(4–7)}, 6–7^{(5–7)}, 7–6^{(7–4)}, 2–6
Loss	6.	Aug 1997	Indianapolis, United States	Hard	(Sweden) Jonas Björkman	3–6, 6–7^{(3–7)}
Win	3.	Aug 1997	Long Island, United States	Hard	(Australia) Patrick Rafter	6–4, 7–6^{(7–1)}
Loss	7.	Sep 1997	Bournemouth, UK	Clay	(Spain) Félix Mantilla	2–6, 2–6
Win	4.	Apr 1998	Monte Carlo, Monaco	Clay	(France) Cédric Pioline	6–3, 6–0, 7–5
Win	5.	Jun 1998	French Open	Clay	(Spain) Àlex Corretja	6–3, 7–5, 6–3
Loss	8.	Oct 1998	Mallorca, Spain	Clay	(Brazil) Gustavo Kuerten	7–6^{(7–5)}, 2–6, 3–6
Loss	9.	Nov 1998	ATP Championships, Germany	Hard	(Spain) Àlex Corretja	6–3, 6–3, 5–7, 3–6, 5–7
Loss	10.	Mar 1999	Indian Wells, United States	Hard	(Australia) Mark Philippoussis	7–5, 4–6, 4–6, 6–4, 2–6
Win	6.	Apr 2000	Estoril, Portugal	Clay	(Spain) Francisco Clavet	6–3, 6–2
Loss	11.	Apr 2000	Toulouse, France	Hard (i)	(Spain) Àlex Corretja	3–6, 2–6
Loss	12.	Apr 2001	Barcelona, Spain	Clay	(Spain) Juan Carlos Ferrero	6–4, 5–7, 6–3, 3–6, 5–7
Win	7.	Jul 2001	Umag, Croatia (2)	Clay	(France) Jérôme Golmard	6–4, 3–6, 7–6^{(7–2)}
Win	8.	Mar 2002	Acapulco, Mexico	Clay	(Brazil) Fernando Meligeni	7–6^{(7–4)}, 7–6^{(7–4)}
Loss	13.	Apr 2002	Monte Carlo, Monaco	Clay	(Spain) Juan Carlos Ferrero	5–7, 3–6, 4–6
Win	9.	Jul 2002	Båstad, Sweden	Clay	(Morocco) Younes El Aynaoui	6–3, 2–6, 7–5
Win	10.	Jul 2002	Umag, Croatia (3)	Clay	(Spain) David Ferrer	6–2, 6–3
Win	11.	Aug 2002	Cincinnati, United States	Hard	(Australia) Lleyton Hewitt	7–5, 7–6^{(7–5)}
Loss	14.	Sep 2002	Hong Kong, China SAR	Hard	(Spain) Juan Carlos Ferrero	3–6, 6–1, 6–7^{(4–7)}
Win	12.	Feb 2003	Buenos Aires, Argentina (2)	Clay	(Argentina) Guillermo Coria	6–3, 4–6, 6–4
Loss	15.	Mar 2003	Miami, United States	Hard	(United States) Andre Agassi	3–6, 3–6
Win	13.	Apr 2003	Barcelona, Spain	Clay	(Russia) Marat Safin	5–7, 6–2, 6–2, 3–0 retired
Win	14.	Jul 2003	Umag, Croatia (4)	Clay	(Italy) Filippo Volandri	6–4, 3–6, 7–5
Loss	16.	Oct 2003	Vienna, Austria	Hard (i)	(Switzerland) Roger Federer	3–6, 3–6, 3–6
Win	15.	Jan 2004	Chennai, India	Hard	(Thailand) Paradorn Srichaphan	6–4, 3–6, 7–6^{(7–5)}
Loss	17.	Jan 2004	Sydney, Australia	Hard	(Australia) Lleyton Hewitt	3–4 ret.
Loss	18.	Feb 2004	Buenos Aires, Argentina	Clay	(Argentina) Guillermo Coria	4–6, 1–6
Win	16.	Mar 2004	Acapulco, Mexico (2)	Clay	(Spain) Fernando Verdasco	6–3, 6–0
Win	17.	May 2004	Rome, Italy	Clay	(Argentina) David Nalbandian	6–3, 6–3, 6–1
Win	18.	Jan 2005	Chennai, India (2)	Hard	(Thailand) Paradorn Srichaphan	3–6, 6–4, 7–6^{(7–5)}
Loss	19.	Aug 2005	Umag, Croatia	Clay	(Argentina) Guillermo Coria	2–6, 6–4, 2–6
Loss	20.	Jan 2006	Chennai, India	Hard	(Croatia) Ivan Ljubičić	6–7^{(6–8)}, 2–6
Win	19.	Feb 2006	Buenos Aires, Argentina (3)	Clay	(Italy) Filippo Volandri	7–6^{(8–6)}, 6–4
Loss	21.	Jan 2007	Sydney, Australia	Hard	(United States) James Blake	3–6, 7–5, 1–6
Loss	22.	Mar 2007	Acapulco, Mexico	Clay	(Argentina) Juan Ignacio Chela	3–6, 6–7^{(2–7)}
Win	20.	Jul 2007	Umag, Croatia (5)	Clay	(Romania) Andrei Pavel	6–4, 6–2
Loss	23.	Feb 2008	Costa do Sauípe, Brazil	Clay	(Spain) Nicolás Almagro	6–7^{(4–7)}, 6–3, 5–7
Loss	24.	Sep 2008	Bucharest, Romania	Clay	(France) Gilles Simon	3–6, 4–6

== Team ==
2004 – Davis Cup winner with Spain

== Singles performance timeline ==
Key
W	F	SF	QF	#R	RR	Q#	P#	DNQ	A	Z#	PO	G	S	B	NMS	NTI	P	NH

(W) winner; (F) finalist; (SF) semifinalist; (QF) quarterfinalist; (#R) rounds 4, 3, 2, 1; (RR) round-robin stage; (Q#) qualification round; (P#) preliminary round; (DNQ) did not qualify; (A) absent; (Z#) Davis/Fed Cup Zonal Group (with number indication) or (PO) play-off; (G) gold, (S) silver or (B) bronze Olympic/Paralympic medal; (NMS) not a Masters tournament; (NTI) not a Tier I tournament; (P) postponed; (NH) not held; (SR) strike rate (events won / competed); (W–L) win–loss record.

Tournament	1994	1995	1996	1997	1998	1999	2000	2001	2002	2003	2004	2005	2006	2007	2008	2009	2010	SR	W–L
Grand Slam tournaments
Australian Open	A	A	1R	F	2R	1R	A	QF	2R	2R	A	1R	1R	1R	1R	1R	1R	0 / 13	13–13
French Open	A	A	2R	2R	W	4R	1R	2R	3R	QF	QF	4R	3R	QF	1R	A	A	1 / 13	32–12
Wimbledon	A	A	1R	2R	2R	2R	1R	2R	A	A	4R	A	A	1R	A	A	A	0 / 8	7–8
US Open	A	A	2R	1R	SF	2R	4R	3R	2R	4R	3R	2R	3R	QF	2R	A	A	0 / 13	26–13
Win–loss	0–0	0–0	2–4	8–4	14–3	5–4	3–3	8–4	4–3	8–3	9–3	4–3	4–3	8–4	1–3	0–1	0–1	1 / 47	78–46
Year-end championships
Tennis Masters Cup	A	A	A	SF	F	A	A	A	SF	RR	RR	A	A	A	A	A	A	0 / 5	10–9
ATP Masters Series
Indian Wells Masters	A	A	A	2R	3R	F	1R	2R	1R	3R	2R	QF	2R	4R	3R	A	2R	0 / 13	18–12
Miami Open	A	A	A	2R	2R	4R	2R	4R	2R	F	QF	3R	3R	2R	3R	A	A	0 / 12	19–12
Monte-Carlo Masters	A	A	3R	SF	W	QF	2R	2R	F	SF	SF	1R	1R	1R	1R	A	A	1 / 13	26–12
Italian Open	A	A	3R	3R	3R	3R	2R	1R	QF	3R	W	1R	1R	1R	1R	A	A	1 / 13	20–12
German Open	A	A	3R	1R	1R	SF	1R	1R	2R	2R	QF	A	1R	SF	QF	NM1		0 / 12	17–12
Canadian Open	A	A	A	A	A	A	A	2R	2R	1R	3R	1R	3R	1R	1R	A	A	0 / 8	6–8
Cincinnati Masters	A	A	A	A	1R	1R	2R	2R	W	1R	QF	3R	1R	QF	QF	A	A	1 / 11	19–10
Stuttgart / Madrid Open	A	A	1R	1R	1R	A	1R	1R	3R	3R	A	2R	1R	2R	1R	A	1R	0 / 12	3–12
Paris Masters	A	A	3R	1R	1R	2R	1R	1R	SF	A	A	A	A	2R	A	A	A	0 / 8	5–8
Career statistics
Titles	0	1	1	1	2	0	1	1	4	3	3	1	1	1	0	0	0	20	
Finals	0	1	3	6	4	1	2	2	6	5	5	2	2	3	2	0	0	44	
Hardcourt win–loss	0–0	0–0	3–5	25–11	15–12	15–11	15–9	12–11	22–12	20–12	23–10	15–10	12–10	17–12	15–12	1–2	1–2	211–141	
Grass win–loss	0–0	0–0	0–2	1–2	2–2	4–2	1–2	1–2	0–1	1–0	3–1	0–0	0–0	0–1	0–0	0–0	0–0	13–15	
Clay win–loss	0–0	11–7	36–16	27–12	32–10	19–10	16–8	18–8	34–7	37–10	33–8	16–10	18–11	25–10	13–11	1–2	1–3	337–143	
Carpet win–loss	0–0	0–0	4–5	3–5	0–4	0–1	0–1	4–3	3–1	0–0	0–0	0–0	0–0	0–0	0–0	0–0	0–0	14–20	
Overall win–loss	0–0	11–7	43–28	56–30	49–28	38–24	32–20	35–24	59–21	58–22	59–19	31–20	30–21	42–23	28–23	2–4	2–5	575–319	
Win %	–	61%	61%	65%	64%	61%	62%	59%	74%	73%	76%	61%	59%	65%	55%	33%	29%	64.32%	
Year-end ranking	347	61	28	7	5	23	41	19	5	7	5	31	43	17	42	446	516		

== Top 10 wins ==
- He has a 44–60 record against players who were, at the time the match was played, ranked in the top 10.

Season	1995	1996	1997	1998	1999	2000	2001	2002	2003	2004	2005	2006	2007	2008	2009	2010	Total
Wins	0	3	6	7	1	4	1	11	3	3	0	1	3	1	0	0	44

#	Player	Rank	Event	Surface	Rd	Score	Moyá Rank
1996
1.	(Croatia) Goran Ivanišević	6	Munich, Germany	Clay	QF	6–3, 6–4	40
2.	(Austria) Thomas Muster	2	Munich, Germany	Clay	SF	6–3, 6–3	40
3.	(Germany) Boris Becker	3	Paris, France	Carpet (i)	2R	6–3, 5–7, 6–4	24
1997
4.	(South Africa) Wayne Ferreira	10	Sydney, Australia	Hard	1R	2–6, 6–0, 6–3	28
5.	(Germany) Boris Becker	6	Australian Open, Melbourne	Hard	1R	5–7, 7–6^{(7–4)}, 2–6, 6–1, 6–4	25
6.	(United States) Michael Chang	2	Australian Open, Melbourne	Hard	SF	7–5, 6–2, 6–4	25
7.	(Netherlands) Richard Krajicek	5	Monte Carlo, Monaco	Clay	QF	1–6, 6–2, 6–4	8
8.	(United States) Pete Sampras	1	ATP Tour World Championships, Hanover, Germany	Hard (i)	RR	6–3, 6–7^{(4–7)}, 6–2	7
9.	(Austria) Thomas Muster	9	ATP Tour World Championships, Hanover, Germany	Hard (i)	RR	6–2, 6–3	7
1998
10.	(Russia) Yevgeny Kafelnikov	6	Monte Carlo, Monaco	Clay	3R	6–2, 6–3	18
11.	(Spain) Àlex Corretja	8	Monte Carlo, Monaco	Clay	QF	6–3, 6–2	18
12.	(Chile) Marcelo Ríos	3	French Open, Paris	Clay	QF	6–1, 2–6, 6–2, 6–4	12
13.	(Spain) Àlex Corretja	7	US Open, New York	Hard	4R	7–6^{(7–4)}, 7–5, 6–3	10
14.	(Slovakia) Karol Kučera	7	ATP Tour World Championships, Hanover, Germany	Hard (i)	RR	6–7^{(5–7)}, 7–5, 6–3	5
15.	(Russia) Yevgeny Kafelnikov	10	ATP Tour World Championships, Hanover, Germany	Hard (i)	RR	7–5, 7–5	5
16.	(United Kingdom) Tim Henman	9	ATP Tour World Championships, Hanover, Germany	Hard (i)	SF	6–4, 3–6, 7–5	5
1999
17.	(United Kingdom) Tim Henman	7	World Team Cup, Düsseldorf, Germany	Clay	RR	7–5, 3–6, 7–6^{(7–2)}	4
2000
18.	(Sweden) Magnus Norman	5	Estoril, Portugal	Clay	2R	6–1, 6–3	50
19.	(Russia) Yevgeny Kafelnikov	3	Barcelona, Spain	Clay	2R	6–2, 7–6^{(7–4)}	39
20.	(Spain) Àlex Corretja	8	Long Island, United States	Hard	2R	7–5, 1–1, ret.	59
21.	(Spain) Àlex Corretja	8	US Open, New York	Hard	3R	7–6^{(7–4)}, 6–3, 4–6, 6–4	55
2001
22.	(Australia) Lleyton Hewitt	7	Australian Open, Melbourne	Hard	3R	4–6, 6–1, 5–7, 6–2, 7–5	42
2002
23.	(Germany) Tommy Haas	6	Scottsdale, United States	Hard	1R	6–2, 6–7^{(2–7)}, 6–3	25
24.	(Australia) Lleyton Hewitt	1	Monte Carlo, Monaco	Clay	1R	6–4, 6–3	26
25.	(Russia) Marat Safin	6	Monte Carlo, Monaco	Clay	QF	6–1, 2–6, 7–6^{(7–4)}	26
26.	(United Kingdom) Tim Henman	5	Monte Carlo, Monaco	Clay	SF	6–4, 5–7, 6–3	26
27.	(Australia) Lleyton Hewitt	1	Rome, Italy	Clay	2R	6–3, 6–2	25
28.	(Spain) Juan Carlos Ferrero	8	Cincinnati, United States	Hard	SF	6–3, 6–4	17
29.	(Australia) Lleyton Hewitt	1	Cincinnati, United States	Hard	F	7–5, 7–6^{(7–5)}	17
30.	(France) Sébastien Grosjean	4	Paris, France	Carpet (i)	3R	3–6, 7–6^{(12–10)}, 6–1	10
31.	(United States) Andre Agassi	2	Paris, France	Carpet (i)	QF	6–4, 6–4	10
32.	(Russia) Marat Safin	3	Tennis Masters Cup, Shanghai, China	Hard (i)	RR	6–4, 7–5	5
33.	(Australia) Lleyton Hewitt	1	Tennis Masters Cup, Shanghai, China	Hard (i)	RR	6–4, 7–5	5
2003
34.	(Russia) Marat Safin	8	Barcelona, Spain	Clay	F	5–7, 6–2, 6–2, 3–0, ret.	4
35.	(Germany) Rainer Schüttler	6	Tennis Masters Cup, Houston, United States	Hard	RR	7–5, 6–4	7
36.	(Australia) Mark Philippoussis	9	Davis Cup, Melbourne, Australia	Grass	RR	6–4, 6–4, 4–6, 7–6^{(7–4)}	7
2004
37.	(Argentina) David Nalbandian	8	Rome, Italy	Clay	F	6–3, 6–3, 6–1	9
38.	(Argentina) Gastón Gaudio	10	Tennis Masters Cup, Houston, United States	Hard	RR	6–3, 6–4	5
39.	(United States) Andy Roddick	2	Davis Cup, Seville, Spain	Clay (i)	RR	6–2, 7–6^{(7–1)}, 7–6^{(7–5)}	5
2006
40.	(Spain) Rafael Nadal	2	Miami, United States	Hard	2R	2–6, 6–1, 6–1	35
2007
41.	(United States) James Blake	9	Hamburg, Germany	Clay	3R	1–6, 6–3, 6–3	36
42.	(Serbia) Novak Djokovic	6	Hamburg, Germany	Clay	QF	7–6^{(7–4)}, 4–6, 7–5	36
43.	(Serbia) Novak Djokovic	3	Cincinnati, United States	Hard	2R	6–4, 6–1	19
2008
44.	(Russia) Nikolay Davydenko	5	Cincinnati, United States	Hard	2R	7–6^{(10–8)}, 4–6, 6–2	41

== Personal life ==
In July 2011, Moyá married actress Carolina Cerezuela. They have two daughters and a son.

== See also ==
- List of Grand Slam men's singles champions

Sporting positions
Preceded by (United States) Pete Sampras	World No. 1; 15 March 1999 – 28 March 1999 (2 weeks)	Succeeded by (United States) Pete Sampras
Preceded by (Sweden) Thomas Enqvist	ATP Champions Tour; Year-End No.1; 2011, 2012	Succeeded by Incumbent
