= 2010 Aspria Tennis Cup – Doubles =

Doubles
- 2010 Aspria Tennis Cup

Final
- Champion: (Italy) Daniele Bracciali (Spain) Rubén Ramírez Hidalgo
- Runner-up: (United States) James Cerretani (South Africa) Jeff Coetzee
- Score: 6–4, 7–5

Events
Singles	Doubles
← 2009 ·	Aspria Tennis Cup	· 2011 →

Yves Allegro and Daniele Bracciali are the defending champions but Allegro chose not to participate that year.
Bracciali partnered up with Rubén Ramírez Hidalgo, and they won in the final 6–4, 7–5 against James Cerretani and Jeff Coetzee.

== Seeds ==
1. (United States) James Cerretani / (South Africa) Jeff Coetzee (final)
2. (Italy) Daniele Bracciali / (Spain) Rubén Ramírez Hidalgo (champions)
3. (Australia) Sadik Kadir / (India) Purav Raja (first round)
4. (United States) Brian Battistone / (France) Olivier Charroin (quarterfinals)

== Main draw ==
=== Key ===
- Q = Qualifier
- WC = Wild card
- LL = Lucky loser
- Alt = Alternate
- SE = Special exempt
- PR = Protected ranking
- ITF = ITF entry
- JE = Junior exempt
- w/o = Walkover
- r = Retired
- d = Defaulted
- SR = Special ranking

=== Draw ===
First round
1	(United States) J Cerretani (South Africa) J Coetzee	7	7
WC	(Italy) F Colangelo (Italy) D Giorgini	5	5
(Italy) S Ianni (Brazil) M Torres	3	2
(Argentina) F del Bonis (Spain) C Poch-Gradin	6	6
4	(United States) B Battistone (France) O Charroin	6^{5}	6	[10]
(Russia) E Donskoy (Argentina) D Junqueira	7	2	[6]
(Italy) MCrugnola (Italy) A di Mauro	1	3
(Kazakhstan) M Kukushkin (Russia) D Sitak	6	6
WC	(Italy) E Fioravante (Italy) N Remedy	3	4
(Colombia) A González (Colombia) C Salamanca	6	6
(Spain) P Andújar (Argentina) C Berlocq	6	6
3	(Australia) S Kadir (India) P Raja	3	3
(Austria) R Eitzinger (Romania) P-A Luncanu	6	6
WC	(Italy) M Ielpo (Switzerland) S Mezzadri	0	0
(Italy) A Arnaboldi (Romania) A Ungur	4	5
2	(Italy) D Bracciali (Spain) R Ramírez Hidalgo	6	7

Quarterfinals
1	(United States) J Cerretani (South Africa) J Coetzee	6	6
(Argentina) F del Bonis (Spain) C Poch-Gradin	1	0
4	(United States) B Battistone (France) O Charroin	4	7	[3]
(Kazakhstan) M Kukushkin (Russia) D Sitak	6	6^{2}	[10]
(Colombia) A González (Colombia) C Salamanca	3	6^{5}
(Spain) P Andújar (Argentina) C Berlocq	6	7
(Austria) R Eitzinger (Romania) P-A Luncanu	3	3
2	(Italy) D Bracciali (Spain) R Ramírez Hidalgo	6	6

Semifinals
1	(United States) J Cerretani (South Africa) J Coetzee	6	6
(Kazakhstan) M Kukushkin (Russia) D Sitak	1	4
(Spain) P Andújar (Argentina) C Berlocq	4	7	[5]
2	(Italy) D Bracciali (Spain) R Ramírez Hidalgo	6	5	[10]

Finals
1	(United States) J Cerretani (South Africa) J Coetzee	4	5
2	(Italy) D Bracciali (Spain) R Ramírez Hidalgo	6	7
