= 2009 Zenith Tennis Cup – Doubles =

Doubles
- 2009 Zenith Tennis Cup

Final
- Champions: (Switzerland) Yves Allegro (Italy) Daniele Bracciali
- Runners-up: (Italy) Manuel Jorquera (Italy) Francesco Piccari
- Score: 6–4, 6–2

Events
Singles	Doubles
← 2008 ·	Zenith Tennis Cup	· 2010 →

Yves Allegro and Horia Tecău were the defending champions, however Tecău chose to not participate.
Yves Allegro partnered up with Daniele Bracciali and they won in the final 6–4, 6–2, against Manuel Jorquera and Francesco Piccari.

== Seeds ==
1. (Switzerland) Yves Allegro / (Italy) Daniele Bracciali (champions)
2. (Colombia) Juan Sebastián Cabal / (Chile) Guillermo Hormazábal (first round)
3. (Germany) Denis Gremelmayr / (Brazil) Márcio Torres (first round)
4. (Kazakhstan) Yuri Schukin / (Russia) Dmitri Sitak (semifinals)

== Draw ==
=== Key ===
- Q = Qualifier
- WC = Wild card
- LL = Lucky loser
- Alt = Alternate
- SE = Special exempt
- PR = Protected ranking
- ITF = ITF entry
- JE = Junior exempt
- w/o = Walkover
- r = Retired
- d = Defaulted
- SR = Special ranking

=== Draw ===
First round
1	(Switzerland) Y Allegro (Italy) D Bracciali	6	6
WC	(Switzerland) S Mezzadri (Italy) T Rossini	1	2
(Italy) G Naso (Italy) W Trusendi	6	7
(Spain) A Ramos-Viñolas (Brazil) J Silva	2	5
4	(Kazakhstan) Y Schukin (Russia) D Sitak	6	3	[10]
(Italy) F Colangelo (Italy) A di Mauro	3	6	[8]
(Italy) E Burzi (Italy) S Vagnozzi	6	6^{5}	[6]
(Italy) T Fabbiano (Ukraine) D Molchanov	4	7	[10]
(France) R Jouan (France) M Montcourt	6	5	[6]
WC	(Italy) F Aldi (Italy) L Azzaro	3	7	[10]
(France) T Ascione (France) J Haehnel	6	7
3	(Germany) D Gremelmayr (Brazil) M Torres	2	5
(Argentina) J-M Aranguren (Argentina) L Migani	6	6
(United States) W Odesnik (Canada) P Polansky	4	4
WC	(Italy) M Jorquera (Italy) F Piccari	6	6
2	(Colombia) JS Cabal (Chile) G Hormazábal	2	4

Quarterfinals
1	(Switzerland) Y Allegro (Italy) D Bracciali	7	6
(Italy) G Naso (Italy) W Trusendi	6^{0}	3
4	(Kazakhstan) Y Schukin (Russia) D Sitak	7	6
(Italy) T Fabbiano (Ukraine) D Molchanov	6^{5}	3
WC	(Italy) F Aldi (Italy) L Azzaro	1	3
(France) T Ascione (France) J Haehnel	6	6
(Argentina) J-M Aranguren (Argentina) L Migani	1	4
WC	(Italy) M Jorquera (Italy) F Piccari	6	6

Semifinals
1	(Switzerland) Y Allegro (Italy) D Bracciali	6	7
4	(Kazakhstan) Y Schukin (Russia) D Sitak	4	6^{3}
(France) T Ascione (France) J Haehnel	2	2
WC	(Italy) M Jorquera (Italy) F Piccari	6	6

Finals
1	(Switzerland) Y Allegro (Italy) D Bracciali	6	6
WC	(Italy) M Jorquera (Italy) F Piccari	4	2
