= 2009 Zenith Tennis Cup – Singles =

Singles
- 2009 Zenith Tennis Cup

Final
- Champion: (Italy) Alessio di Mauro
- Runner-up: (France) Vincent Millot
- Score: 6–4, 7–6(3)

Events
Singles	Doubles
← 2008 ·	Zenith Tennis Cup	· 2010 →

Teymuraz Gabashvili was the defender of title. He didn't start in this year.
Alessio di Mauro won in the final 6–4, 7–6(3), against Vincent Millot.

== Seeds ==
1. (Chile) Nicolás Massú (quarterfinals)
2. (United States) Wayne Odesnik (quarterfinals)
3. (France) Mathieu Montcourt (quarterfinals)
4. (Argentina) Agustín Calleri (first round)
5. (Italy) Filippo Volandri (semifinals)
6. (Germany) Denis Gremelmayr (first round)
7. (Kazakhstan) Yuri Schukin (first round)
8. (Italy) Alessio di Mauro (champion)

== Draw ==
=== Key ===
- Q = Qualifier
- WC = Wild card
- LL = Lucky loser
- Alt = Alternate
- SE = Special exempt
- PR = Protected ranking
- ITF = ITF entry
- JE = Junior exempt
- w/o = Walkover
- r = Retired
- d = Defaulted
- SR = Special ranking

=== Final four ===
Semifinals
(France) Vincent Millot	7	6
Q	(Argentina) Federico Delbonis	5	2
8	(Italy) Alessio di Mauro	7	6
5	(Italy) Filippo Volandri	5	0

Final
(France) Vincent Millot	4	6^{3}
8	(Italy) Alessio di Mauro	6	7

=== Top half ===
First round
1	(Chile) N Massú	6	6
(Argentina) L Migani	3	3
(Italy) A Brizzi	6	6
(Italy) L Vanni	3	3
Q	(Italy) W Trusendi	5	6	2
(France) V Millot	7	3	6
(France) T Ascione	6	6
7	(Kazakhstan) Y Schukin	4	3
4	(Argentina) A Calleri	6	1	0
(Argentina) J-M Aranguren	4	6	6
(Argentina) M Puerta	6	6
(Italy) E Burzi	4	4
(France) R Jouan	6	6
Q	(Italy) F Aldi	1	1
Q	(Argentina) F Delbonis	4	6	6
6	(Germany) D Gremelmayr	6	1	2

Second round
1	(Chile) N Massú	4	6	7
(Italy) A Brizzi	6	3	6^{0}
(France) V Millot	3	6	6
(France) T Ascione	6	3	4
(Argentina) J-M Aranguren	5	2
(Argentina) M Puerta	7	6
(France) R Jouan	7	6^{4}	3
Q	(Argentina) F Delbonis	6^{2}	7	6

Quarterfinals
1	(Chile) N Massú	4	2
(France) V Millot	6	6
(Argentina) M Puerta	0	0	r
Q	(Argentina) F Delbonis	6	2

Semifinals
(France) V Millot	7	6
Q	(Argentina) F Delbonis	5	2

=== Bottom half ===
First round
8	(Italy) A di Mauro	6	6
WC	(Italy) F Colangelo	2	3
WC	(Italy) D Bracciali	4	3
Q	(Italy) F Piccari	6	6
WC	(Argentina) M Zabaleta	4	6	3
(France) J Haehnel	6	3	6
(Spain) J Genaro-Martínez	1	2
3	(France) M Montcourt	6	6
5	(Italy) F Volandri	6	6
(Chile) G Hormazábal	3	4
(Brazil) J Silva	3	3
WC	(Italy) G Naso	6	6
(Italy) S Vagnozzi	6	6
(Canada) P Polansky	2	2
(Spain) A Ramos Viñolas	4	6^{3}
2	(United States) W Odesnik	6	7

Second round
8	(Italy) A di Mauro	6	6
Q	(Italy) F Piccari	4	3
(France) J Haehnel	2	1
3	(France) M Montcourt	6	6
5	(Italy) F Volandri	1	7	6
WC	(Italy) G Naso	6	6^{6}	2
(Italy) S Vagnozzi	4	1
2	(United States) W Odesnik	6	6

Quarterfinals
8	(Italy) A di Mauro	6	6
3	(France) M Montcourt	1	4
5	(Italy) F Volandri	6	6
2	(United States) W Odesnik	2	3

Semifinals
8	(Italy) A di Mauro	7	6
5	(Italy) F Volandri	5	0
