= 2011 Aspria Tennis Cup Trofeo City Life – Singles =

Singles
- 2011 Aspria Tennis Cup Trofeo City Life

Final
- Champion: (Spain) Albert Ramos
- Runner-up: (Kazakhstan) Evgeny Korolev
- Score: 6–4, 3–0, ret.

Events
Singles	Doubles
← 2010 ·	Aspria Tennis Cup Trofeo City Life	· 2012 →

Frederico Gil was the defending champion, but decided to compete in the Aegon International instead.

Albert Ramos won the title, defeating Evgeny Korolev in the final after Korolev retired due to fatigue with Ramos leading 6–4, 3–0.

== Seeds ==
1. (Spain) Pere Riba (second round)
2. (Spain) Rubén Ramírez Hidalgo (first round)
3. (Spain) Albert Ramos (champion)
4. (France) Éric Prodon (second round)
5. (Argentina) Horacio Zeballos (quarterfinals)
6. (Argentina) Brian Dabul (semifinals)
7. (France) Maxime Teixeira (first round)
8. (Italy) Simone Vagnozzi (first round)

== Draw ==
=== Key ===
- Q = Qualifier
- WC = Wild card
- LL = Lucky loser
- Alt = Alternate
- SE = Special exempt
- PR = Protected ranking
- ITF = ITF entry
- JE = Junior exempt
- w/o = Walkover
- r = Retired
- d = Defaulted
- SR = Special ranking

=== Finals ===
Semifinals
(Italy) Stefano Galvani	6	3	1
3	(Spain) Albert Ramos	2	6	6
6	(Argentina) Brian Dabul	2	4
(Kazakhstan) Evgeny Korolev	6	6

Final
3	(Spain) Albert Ramos	6	3
(Kazakhstan) Evgeny Korolev	4	0^{r}

=== Top half ===
First round
1	(Spain) P Riba	6	6
WC	(Austria) T Muster	3	1
(Russia) E Donskoy	4	6^{5}
(Italy) S Galvani	6	7
(United States) W Odesnik	6	6
Q	(Italy) A Arnaboldi	2	0
(Chinese Taipei) T-h Yang	6	6^{5}	4
5	(Argentina) H Zeballos	3	7	6
3	(Spain) A Ramos	6	7
Q	(Italy) Antonio Comporto	2	5
WC	(Italy) S Travaglia	6	7
WC	(Italy) Matteo Volante	3	6^{7}
WC	(Italy) M Trevisan	5	0^{r}
(United States) K Kim	7	0
(Italy) A Brizzi	6	6
8	(Italy) S Vagnozzi	3	4

Second round
1	(Spain) P Riba	6	6^{6}	4
(Italy) S Galvani	2	7	6
(United States) W Odesnik	7	0	6^{3}
5	(Argentina) H Zeballos	6^{1}	6	7
3	(Spain) A Ramos	6	6
WC	(Italy) S Travaglia	1	3
(United States) K Kim	2	1
(Italy) A Brizzi	6	6

Quarterfinals
(Italy) S Galvani	7	6
5	(Argentina) H Zeballos	5	3
3	(Spain) A Ramos	6	6
(Italy) A Brizzi	2	4

Semifinals
(Italy) S Galvani	6	3	1
3	(Spain) A Ramos	2	6	6

=== Bottom half ===
First round
6	(Argentina) B Dabul	6	6
(Spain) A Menéndez	2	3
(Germany) D Kindlmann	2	1^{r}
(Czech Republic) J Mertl	6	2
(France) J Dasnières de Veigy	6	1	6
(Argentina) E Schwank	4	6	3
(Uzbekistan) F Dustov	6	1	4
4	(France) É Prodon	2	6	6
7	(France) M Teixeira	3	4
Q	(Monaco) B Balleret	6	6
(Serbia) F Krajinović	6^{1}	7	3
Q	(Republic of Ireland) J McGee	7	6^{7}	6
(Italy) D Giorgini	1	7^{7}	6
(Spain) P Carreño Busta	6	6^{4}	1
(Kazakhstan) E Korolev	7^{7}	6
2	(Spain) R Ramírez Hidalgo	6^{3}	4

Second round
6	(Argentina) B Dabul	6	7
(Czech Republic) J Mertl	4	5
(France) J Dasnières de Veigy	2	6	6
4	(France) É Prodon	6	4	1
Q	(Monaco) B Balleret	2	7	6
Q	(Republic of Ireland) J McGee	6	6^{4}	2
(Italy) D Giorgini	3	4
(Kazakhstan) E Korolev	6	6

Quarterfinals
6	(Argentina) B Dabul	6	3	6
(France) J Dasnières de Veigy	4	6	3
Q	(Monaco) B Balleret	3	6	2
(Kazakhstan) E Korolev	6	3	6

Semifinals
6	(Argentina) B Dabul	2	4
(Kazakhstan) E Korolev	6	6
