= 2012 Aspria Tennis Cup Trofeo City Life =

- Date: June 25 – July 1
- Edition: 7th
- Surface: Clay
- Location: Milan, Italy

Champions

Singles
- (Spain) Tommy Robredo

Doubles
- (United States) Nicholas Monroe / (Germany) Simon Stadler
← 2011 ·	Aspria Tennis Cup	· 2013 →

The 2012 Aspria Tennis Cup Trofeo City Life was a professional tennis tournament played on outdoor red clay courts. It was the seventh edition of the tournament and was part of the 2012 ATP Challenger Tour. It took place in Milan, Italy between 25 June and 1 July 2012.

== ATP entrants ==
=== Seeds ===
Nationality	Player	Ranking*	Seeding
POR	Frederico Gil	107	1
ARG	Federico Delbonis	114	2
ITA	Alessandro Giannessi	127	3
CRO	Antonio Veić	143	4
KAZ	Andrey Golubev	147	5
POR	João Sousa	148	6
FRA	Augustin Gensse	150	7
ROU	Victor Hănescu	153	8

- Rankings are as of June 18, 2012.

=== Other entrants ===
The following players received wildcards into the singles main draw:

- (Italy) Andrea Arnaboldi
- (Portugal) Frederico Gil
- (Romania) Victor Hănescu
- (Spain) Tommy Robredo

The following players received entry from the qualifying draw:

- (Monaco) Benjamin Balleret
- (France) Nicolas Devilder
- (Czech Republic) Marek Michalička
- (Italy) Walter Trusendi

== Champions ==
=== Singles ===
- (Spain) Tommy Robredo def. (Argentina) Martín Alund 6-3 6-0

=== Doubles ===
- (United States) Nicholas Monroe / (Germany) Simon Stadler def. (Kazakhstan) Andrey Golubev / (Kazakhstan) Yuri Schukin, 6–4, 3–6, [11–9]
