= 2012 Aspria Tennis Cup Trofeo City Life – Doubles =

Doubles
- 2012 Aspria Tennis Cup Trofeo City Life

Final
- Champions: (United States) Nicholas Monroe (Germany) Simon Stadler
- Runners-up: (Kazakhstan) Andrey Golubev (Kazakhstan) Yuri Schukin
- Score: 6–4, 3–6, [11–9]

Events
Singles	Doubles
← 2011 ·	Aspria Tennis Cup Trofeo City Life	· 2013 →

Adrián Menéndez and Simone Vagnozzi were the defending champions but decided not to participate.
Nicholas Monroe and Simon Stadler won the final 6–4, 3–6, [11–9] against Andrey Golubev and Yuri Schukin.

== Seeds ==
1. (United States) Nicholas Monroe / (Germany) Simon Stadler (champions)
2. (Italy) Alessio di Mauro / (Italy) Alessandro Motti (quarterfinals)
3. (Croatia) Marin Draganja / (Croatia) Antonio Veić (quarterfinals)
4. (India) Purav Raja / (Italy) Walter Trusendi (first round)

== Draw ==
=== Key ===
- Q = Qualifier
- WC = Wild card
- LL = Lucky loser
- Alt = Alternate
- SE = Special exempt
- PR = Protected ranking
- ITF = ITF entry
- JE = Junior exempt
- w/o = Walkover
- r = Retired
- d = Defaulted
- SR = Special ranking

=== Draw ===
First round
1	(United States) N Monroe (Germany) S Stadler	6	6
(France) G Burquier (Belgium) Y Mertens	3	2
WC	(Italy) S Ianni (Italy) Matteo Volante	3	4
(Romania) V Hănescu (Austria) N Moser	6	6
3	(Croatia) M Draganja (Croatia) A Veić	6	6
WC	(Italy) Federico Dragoni (Italy) Andrea Fierro	0	2
(Argentina) M Alund (Argentina) F Bagnis	6^{6}	6	[11]
(Italy) A Giannessi (Portugal) J Sousa	7^{8}	4	[9]
(France) M Gicquel (France) R Jouan	6	7^{7}
WC	(Italy) Antonio Comporto (Italy) Riccardo Sinicropi	3	6^{4}
(Argentina) F Delbonis (Argentina) Nicolás Pastor	6	6
4	(India) P Raja (Italy) W Trusendi	3	4
(Serbia) N Ćirić (Serbia) D Lajović	1	6^{7}
(Kazakhstan) A Golubev (Kazakhstan) Y Schukin	6	7^{9}
(France) N Devilder (France) A Gensse	3	5
2	(Italy) A di Mauro (Italy) A Motti	6	7

Quarterfinals
1	(United States) N Monroe (Germany) S Stadler	6	3	[10]
(Romania) V Hănescu (Austria) N Moser	4	6	[7]
3	(Croatia) M Draganja (Croatia) A Veić	4	6	[4]
(Argentina) M Alund (Argentina) F Bagnis	6	4	[10]
(France) M Gicquel (France) R Jouan	2	3
(Argentina) F Delbonis (Argentina) Nicolás Pastor	6	6
(Kazakhstan) A Golubev (Kazakhstan) Y Schukin	6	6
2	(Italy) A di Mauro (Italy) A Motti	3	2

Semifinals
1	(United States) N Monroe (Germany) S Stadler	3	6	[11]
(Argentina) M Alund (Argentina) F Bagnis	6	4	[9]
(Argentina) F Delbonis (Argentina) Nicolás Pastor	3	3
(Kazakhstan) A Golubev (Kazakhstan) Y Schukin	6	6

Final
1	(United States) N Monroe (Germany) S Stadler	6	3	[11]
(Kazakhstan) A Golubev (Kazakhstan) Y Schukin	4	6	[9]
