= 2009 ATP Studena Croatia Open Umag – Singles =

Singles
- 2009 ATP Studena Croatia Open Umag
- 2008 Champion: (Spain) Fernando Verdasco

Final
- Champion: (Russia) Nikolay Davydenko
- Runner-up: (Spain) Juan Carlos Ferrero
- Score: 6–3, 6–0

Details
- Draw: 32 (4 Q / 3 WC )
- Seeds: 8

Events
Singles	Doubles
← 2008 ·	Croatia Open	· 2010 →

Fernando Verdasco was the defending champion, but chose not to participate that year.

Nikolay Davydenko won in the final 6–3, 6–0 against Juan Carlos Ferrero.

== Seeds ==
1. (Russia) Nikolay Davydenko (champion)
2. (Spain) David Ferrer (second round)
3. (Serbia) Victor Troicki (first round)
4. (Austria) Jürgen Melzer (semifinals)
5. (Spain) Juan Carlos Ferrero (final)
6. (Spain) Nicolás Almagro (second round)
7. (Italy) Andreas Seppi (semifinals)
8. (Germany) Mischa Zverev (first round)

== Main draw ==
=== Key ===
- Q = Qualifier
- WC = Wild card
- LL = Lucky loser
- Alt = Alternate
- ITF = ITF entry
- PR = Protected ranking
- SR = Special ranking
- SE = Special exempt
- JE = Junior exempt
- JR = Junior Accelerator Programme entrant
- CO = College Accelerator Programme entrant
- NG = Next Gen Accelerator Program entrant
- w/o = Walkover
- r = Retired
- d = Defaulted

=== Finals ===
Semifinals
1	(Russia) Nikolay Davydenko	6	6
4	(Austria) Jürgen Melzer	1	1
5	(Spain) Juan Carlos Ferrero	6	6^{1}	7
7	(Italy) Andreas Seppi	1	7^{7}	5

Final
1	(Russia) Nikolay Davydenko	6	6
5	(Spain) Juan Carlos Ferrero	3	0

=== Top half ===
First round
1	(Russia) N Davydenko	6	6
(Spain) D Gimeno Traver	2	2
(Spain) A Martín	6	6
Q	(Slovakia) M Kližan	4	4
(Italy) S Bolelli	7^{9}	3	6
Q	(Spain) R Ramírez Hidalgo	6^{7}	6	0
(Italy) F Fognini	2	6	6
8	(Germany) M Zverev	6	3	4
4	(Austria) J Melzer	6	7
(Argentina) B Dabul	3	5
WC	(Croatia) I Dodig	3	1
(Uruguay) P Cuevas	6	6
(Croatia) I Ljubičić	6	6
WC	(Italy) F Volandri	1	4
Q	(Spain) M Granollers	1	3
6	(Spain) N Almagro	6	6

Second round
1	(Russia) N Davydenko	6	6
(Spain) A Martín	2	3
(Italy) S Bolelli	6	6
(Italy) F Fognini	3	4
4	(Austria) J Melzer	6	6
(Uruguay) P Cuevas	4	3
(Croatia) I Ljubičić	7	7^{7}
6	(Spain) N Almagro	5	6^{2}

Quarterfinals
1	(Russia) N Davydenko	7^{12}	6
(Italy) S Bolelli	6^{10}	1
4	(Austria) J Melzer	4	7^{7}	6
(Croatia) I Ljubičić	6	6^{3}	3

Semifinals
1	(Russia) N Davydenko	6	6
4	(Austria) J Melzer	1	1

=== Bottom half ===
First round
5	(Spain) JC Ferrero	6	6
(Belgium) C Rochus	2	3
LL	(Slovenia) G Žemlja	1	3
(Italy) P Starace	6	6
(Ukraine) S Stakhovsky	6^{3}	1
(Spain) Ó Hernández	7^{7}	6
(Argentina) M González	6	3	7^{8}
3	(Serbia) V Troicki	4	6	6^{6}
7	(Italy) A Seppi	6	2	6
Q	(Argentina) JI Chela	4	6	3
(Portugal) F Gil	7	6
(Argentina) S Roitman	5	2
(Chile) N Massú	5	6	6
WC	(Slovenia) B Kavčič	7	3	2
(Austria) D Köllerer	1	7^{7}	3
2	(Spain) D Ferrer	6	6^{2}	6

Second round
5	(Spain) JC Ferrero	1	6	6
(Italy) P Starace	6	3	2
(Spain) Ó Hernández	4	4
(Argentina) M González	6	6
7	(Italy) A Seppi	7	7^{7}
(Portugal) F Gil	5	6^{5}
(Chile) N Massú	4	6	6
2	(Spain) D Ferrer	6	2	4

Quarterfinals
5	(Spain) JC Ferrero	7	6
(Argentina) M González	5	2
7	(Italy) A Seppi	6	6
(Chile) N Massú	4	4

Semifinals
5	(Spain) JC Ferrero	6	6^{1}	7
7	(Italy) A Seppi	1	7^{7}	5
