= 2011 Aspria Tennis Cup Trofeo City Life – Doubles =

Doubles
- 2011 Aspria Tennis Cup Trofeo City Life

Final
- Champions: (Spain) Adrián Menéndez (Italy) Simone Vagnozzi
- Runners-up: (Italy) Andrea Arnaboldi (Portugal) Leonardo Tavares
- Score: 0–6, 6–3, [10–5]

Events
Singles	Doubles
← 2010 ·	Aspria Tennis Cup Trofeo City Life	· 2012 →

Daniele Bracciali and Rubén Ramírez Hidalgo were the defending champions but decided not to participate. Bracciali competed in the UNICEF Open instead.

Adrián Menéndez and Simone Vagnozzi won the tournament defeating Andrea Arnaboldi and Leonardo Tavares 0–6, 6–3, [10–5].

== Seeds ==
1. (Spain) Adrián Menéndez / (Italy) Simone Vagnozzi (champions)
2. (Poland) Tomasz Bednarek / (Poland) Mateusz Kowalczyk (first round)
3. (Argentina) Brian Dabul / (Spain) Pere Riba (quarterfinals, withdrew)
4. (France) Olivier Charroin / (Australia) Sadik Kadir (semifinals)

== Draw ==
=== Key ===
- Q = Qualifier
- WC = Wild card
- LL = Lucky loser
- Alt = Alternate
- SE = Special exempt
- PR = Protected ranking
- ITF = ITF entry
- JE = Junior exempt
- w/o = Walkover
- r = Retired
- d = Defaulted
- SR = Special ranking

=== Draw ===
First round
1	(Spain) A Menéndez (Italy) S Vagnozzi	6	4	[17]
WC	(Italy) Enrico Fioravante (Italy) C Grassi	3	6	[15]
(Latvia) A Juška (Kazakhstan) E Korolev	5	1
WC	(Italy) A Brizzi (Italy) Matteo Volante	7	6
3	(Argentina) B Dabul (Spain) P Riba	7^{9}	6
(United States) K Kim (Argentina) H Zeballos	6^{7}	4
(France) J Dasnières de Veigy (France) M Teixeira	6	6
(Austria) Max Raditschnigg (Austria) M Slanar	4	4
(Australia) C Ebelthite (New Zealand) J Statham	3	7^{7}	[10]
(South Africa) J Coetzee (Italy) S Galvani	6	6^{4}	[5]
(Spain) P Carreño-Busta (Spain) A Ramos
4	(France) O Charroin (Australia) S Kadir	w/o
WC	(Italy) S Mezzadri (Italy) Luca Sansotera	0	1
(Czech Republic) J Mertl (France) É Prodon	6	6
(Italy) A Arnaboldi (Portugal) L Tavares	6	6
2	(Poland) T Bednarek (Poland) M Kowalczyk	3	3

Quarterfinals
1	(Spain) A Menéndez (Italy) S Vagnozzi	6	6
WC	(Italy) A Brizzi (Italy) Matteo Volante	2	4
3	(Argentina) B Dabul (Spain) P Riba
(France) J Dasnières de Veigy (France) M Teixeira	w/o
(Australia) C Ebelthite (New Zealand) J Statham	3	5
4	(France) O Charroin (Australia) S Kadir	6	7
(Czech Republic) J Mertl (France) É Prodon	4	2
(Italy) A Arnaboldi (Portugal) L Tavares	6	6

Semifinals
1	(Spain) A Menéndez (Italy) S Vagnozzi	6	6
(France) J Dasnières de Veigy (France) M Teixeira	1	1
4	(France) O Charroin (Australia) S Kadir	6	4	[6]
(Italy) A Arnaboldi (Portugal) L Tavares	3	6	[10]

Final
1	(Spain) A Menéndez (Italy) S Vagnozzi	0	6	[10]
(Italy) A Arnaboldi (Portugal) L Tavares	6	3	[5]
