= 2008 Croatia Open Umag – Doubles =

Doubles
- 2008 Croatia Open Umag
- 2007 Champions: (Czech Republic) Lukáš Dlouhý (Slovakia) Michal Mertiňák

Final
- Champions: (Slovakia) Michal Mertiňák; (Czech Republic) Petr Pála
- Runners-up: (Argentina) Carlos Berlocq; (Italy) Fabio Fognini
- Score: 2–6, 6–3, [10–5]

Details
- Draw: 16
- Seeds: 4

Events
| Singles | Doubles |
| ← 2007 · | Croatia Open | · 2009 → |

Lukáš Dlouhý and Michal Mertiňák were the defending champions, but Dlouhy chose not to participate, and only Mertinak competed that year.
Mertinak partnered with Petr Pála, and won in the final 2–6, 6–3, [10–5], against Carlos Berlocq and Fabio Fognini.

== Seeds ==
1. (Czech Republic) David Škoch / (Croatia) Lovro Zovko (semifinals)
2. (Czech Republic) Jaroslav Levinský / (Slovakia) Filip Polášek (semifinals)
3. (Slovakia) Michal Mertiňák / (Czech Republic) Petr Pála (champions)
4. (Australia) Stephen Huss / (United Kingdom) Ross Hutchins (first round)

== Draw ==
=== Key ===
- Q = Qualifier
- WC = Wild card
- LL = Lucky loser
- Alt = Alternate
- ITF = ITF entry
- PR = Protected ranking
- SR = Special ranking
- SE = Special exempt
- JE = Junior exempt
- JR = Junior Accelerator Programme entrant
- CO = College Accelerator Programme entrant
- NG = Next Gen Accelerator Program entrant
- w/o = Walkover
- r = Retired
- d = Defaulted

=== Draw ===
First round

Quarterfinals

Semifinals

Final

1
- (Czech Republic) D Škoch
- (Croatia) L Zovko
6
6

- (Croatia) R Karanušić
- (Serbia) B Pašanski
0
2

1
- (Czech Republic) D Škoch
- (Croatia) L Zovko
6
2
[10]

- (Italy) G Naso
- (Italy) F Piccari
6
6

- (Italy) G Naso
- (Italy) F Piccari
1
6
[7]

- (Brazil) M Daniel
- (Chile) N Massú
4
4

1
- (Czech Republic) D Škoch
- (Croatia) L Zovko
3
4

3
- (Slovakia) M Mertiňák
- (Czech Republic) P Pála
6
6

3
- (Slovakia) M Mertiňák
- (Czech Republic) P Pála
6
6

- (Italy) F Cipolla
- (Italy) S Vagnozzi
4
4

3
- (Slovakia) M Mertiňák
- (Czech Republic) P Pála
6
6

- (Croatia) F Škugor
- (Croatia) A Veić
6
4
[8]

- (Russia) I Andreev
- (Spain) D Gimeno Traver
3
1

- (Russia) I Andreev
- (Spain) D Gimeno Traver
4
6
[10]

3
- (Slovakia) M Mertiňák
- (Czech Republic) P Pála
2
6
[10]

WC
- (Croatia) I Karlović
- (Croatia) J Topić
6^{5}
6
[11]

- (Argentina) C Berlocq
- (Italy) F Fognini
6
3
[5]

- (Croatia) I Cerović
- (Croatia) I Dodig
7^{7}
1
[13]

- (Croatia) I Cerović
- (Croatia) I Dodig
3
1

- (Argentina) C Berlocq
- (Italy) F Fognini
6
6

- (Argentina) C Berlocq
- (Italy) F Fognini
6
6

4
- (Australia) S Huss
- (United Kingdom) R Hutchins
2
2

- (Argentina) C Berlocq
- (Italy) F Fognini
7
6

- (Russia) M Kukushkin
- (Italy) A Motti
1
6
[10]

2
- (Czech Republic) J Levinský
- (Slovakia) F Polášek
5
2

- (Romania) F Mergea
- (Romania) H Tecău
6
1
[5]

- (Russia) M Kukushkin
- (Italy) A Motti
6^{4}
6
[7]

WC
- (Bosnia and Herzegovina) M Bašić
- (Croatia) R Raguz
3
5

2
- (Czech Republic) J Levinský
- (Slovakia) F Polášek
7^{7}
3
[10]

2
- (Czech Republic) J Levinský
- (Slovakia) F Polášek
6
7
