= 2008 Croatia Open Umag – Singles =

Singles
- 2008 Croatia Open Umag
- 2007 Champion: (Spain) Carlos Moyá

Final
- Champion: (Spain) Fernando Verdasco
- Runner-up: (Russia) Igor Andreev
- Score: 3–6, 6–4, 7–6^{(7–4)}

Details
- Draw: 28 (4Q / 3WC)
- Seeds: 8

Events
Singles	Doubles
← 2007 ·	Croatia Open	· 2009 →

Carlos Moyá was the defending champion, but lost in the quarterfinals to Fabio Fognini.

Fernando Verdasco won in the final 3–6, 6–4, 7–6^{(7–4)}, against Igor Andreev.

== Seeds ==
The top four seeds receive a bye into the second round.

1. (Spain) Fernando Verdasco (champion)
2. (Croatia) Ivo Karlović (second round)
3. (Spain) Carlos Moyá (quarterfinals)
4. (Russia) Igor Andreev (final)
5. (Croatia) Ivan Ljubičić (second round, withdrew due to a back pain)
6. (Argentina) Guillermo Cañas (quarterfinals)
7. (Italy) Fabio Fognini (semifinals)
8. (Brazil) Marcos Daniel (second round)

== Draw ==
=== Key ===
- Q = Qualifier
- WC = Wild card
- LL = Lucky loser
- Alt = Alternate
- ITF = ITF entry
- PR = Protected ranking
- SR = Special ranking
- SE = Special exempt
- JE = Junior exempt
- JR = Junior Accelerator Programme entrant
- CO = College Accelerator Programme entrant
- NG = Next Gen Accelerator Program entrant
- w/o = Walkover
- r = Retired
- d = Defaulted

=== Finals ===
Semifinals
1	(Spain) Fernando Verdasco	6	6
7	(Italy) Fabio Fognini	1	3
4	(Russia) Igor Andreev	6	7^{7}
(Argentina) Máximo González	2	6^{2}

Final
1	(Spain) Fernando Verdasco	3	6	7^{7}
4	(Russia) Igor Andreev	6	4	6^{4}

=== Top half ===
First round
Q	(France) M Montcourt	6	6
WC	(Croatia) A Veić	4	2
WC	(Croatia) L Belic	2	3
(Germany) M Zverev	6	6
(Argentina) C Berlocq	3	6	4
8	(Brazil) M Daniel	6	4	6
(Serbia) V Troicki	6	6
(Czech Republic) J Vaněk	3	1
(Italy) F Cipolla	1	4
(Italy) F Volandri	6	6
WC	(Lithuania) R Berankis	3	2
7	(Italy) F Fognini	6	6

Second round
1	(Spain) F Verdasco	7^{7}	6
Q	(France) M Montcourt	6^{5}	1
(Germany) M Zverev	6	6
8	(Brazil) M Daniel	4	2
3	(Spain) C Moyá	3	7^{7}	7
(Serbia) V Troicki	6	6^{2}	5
(Italy) F Volandri	4	4
7	(Italy) F Fognini	6	6

Quarterfinals
1	(Spain) F Verdasco	7	7
(Germany) M Zverev	5	5
3	(Spain) C Moyá	4	3
7	(Italy) F Fognini	6	6

Semifinals
1	(Spain) F Verdasco	6	6
7	(Italy) F Fognini	1	3

=== Bottom half ===
First round
6	(Argentina) G Cañas	7	6
(Chile) N Massú	5	2
(Serbia) B Pašanski	6	2	7^{11}
Q	(Italy) G Naso	3	6	6^{9}
(Spain) D Gimeno Traver	6	6
(France) O Patience	2	2
5	(Croatia) I Ljubičić	6	6
(Russia) M Kukushkin	1	2
Q	(Italy) F Piccari	2	2
(Croatia) R Karanušić	6	6
(Argentina) M González	7	6
Q	(Sweden) F Prpic	5	3

Second round
6	(Argentina) G Cañas	6^{3}	6	7
(Serbia) B Pašanski	7^{7}	3	5
(Spain) D Gimeno Traver	2	6^{3}
4	(Russia) I Andreev	6	7^{7}
5	(Croatia) I Ljubičić
(Croatia) R Karanušić	w/o
(Argentina) M González	3	6	6
2	(Croatia) I Karlović	6	3	4

Quarterfinals
6	(Argentina) G Cañas	5	4
4	(Russia) I Andreev	7	6
(Croatia) R Karanušić	6	3	6^{4}
(Argentina) M González	2	6	7^{7}

Semifinals
4	(Russia) I Andreev	6	7^{7}
(Argentina) M González	2	6^{2}
