= 2006 Croatia Open Umag – Singles =

Singles
- 2006 Croatia Open Umag
- 2005 Champions: (Argentina) Guillermo Coria

Final
- Champions: (Switzerland) Stan Wawrinka
- Runners-up: (Serbia) Novak Djokovic
- Score: 6–6 ^{(1–3)} Ret.

Details
- Draw: 32 (4 Q / 3 WC )
- Seeds: 8

Events
Singles	Doubles
← 2005 ·	Croatia Open	· 2007 →

Stan Wawrinka won his first ATP title, after Novak Djokovic retired in the final while leading 3–1 in the first-set tiebreak.

Guillermo Coria was the defending champion, but lost in the first round to Robin Vik.

== Seeds ==
1. (Spain) David Ferrer (withdrew)
2. (Spain) Juan Carlos Ferrero (first round)
3. (Argentina) Guillermo Coria (first round)
4. (Serbia) Novak Djokovic (final, retired due to breathing problems)
5. (Spain) Carlos Moyá (semifinals)
6. (Spain) Alberto Martín (first round)
7. (France) Julien Benneteau (first round)
8. (Italy) Filippo Volandri (semifinals)

== Draw ==
=== Key ===
- Q = Qualifier
- WC = Wild card
- LL = Lucky loser
- Alt = Alternate
- ITF = ITF entry
- PR = Protected ranking
- SR = Special ranking
- SE = Special exempt
- JE = Junior exempt
- JR = Junior Accelerator Programme entrant
- CO = College Accelerator Programme entrant
- NG = Next Gen Accelerator Program entrant
- w/o = Walkover
- r = Retired
- d = Defaulted

=== Finals ===
Semifinals
5	(Spain) Carlos Moyá	1	5
4	(Serbia) Novak Djokovic	6	7
(Switzerland) Stan Wawrinka	7	2	6
8	(Italy) Filippo Volandri	5	6	4

Final
4	(Serbia) Novak Djokovic	6^{3r}
(Switzerland) Stan Wawrinka	6^{1}

=== Top half ===
First round
LL	(Italy) S Galvani	2	2
(Argentina) C Berlocq	6	6
Q	(Argentina) JP Guzmán	4	6	6
(Spain) G García-López	6	3	4
(Italy) A di Mauro	5	6^{5}
(Germany) S Greul	7	7^{7}
(Czech Republic) J Novák	4	7^{8}	6^{3}
5	(Spain) C Moyá	6	6^{6}	7^{7}
4	(Serbia) N Djokovic	6	6
WC	(Croatia) L Belić	3	3
Q	(Italy) S Ianni	6^{6}
(Russia) T Gabashvili	6^{4r}
(Czech Republic) J Vaněk	7	6
Q	(Spain) S Ventura	5	4
(Czech Republic) L Dlouhý	2	6	6
7	(France) J Benneteau	6	3	2

Second round
(Argentina) C Berlocq	6	3	2
Q	(Argentina) JP Guzmán	3	6	6
(Germany) S Greul	2	1
5	(Spain) C Moyá	6	6
4	(Serbia) N Djokovic	6	6
Q	(Italy) S Ianni	3	4
(Czech Republic) J Vaněk	7^{7}	6
(Czech Republic) L Dlouhý	6^{4}	4

Quarterfinals
Q	(Argentina) JP Guzmán	1	4
5	(Spain) C Moyá	6	6
4	(Serbia) N Djokovic	6	3	7
(Czech Republic) J Vaněk	1	6	5

Semifinals
5	(Spain) C Moyá	1	5
4	(Serbia) N Djokovic	6	7

=== Bottom half ===
First round
6	(Spain) A Martín	6^{3}	4
(Switzerland) S Wawrinka	7^{7}	6
(Russia) E Korolev	7^{7}	4	3
WC	(Croatia) M Čilić	6^{5}	6	6
WC	(Argentina) JM del Potro	6	6
(Netherlands) R Sluiter	3	2
(Czech Republic) R Vik	6	6
3	(Argentina) G Coria	2	3
8	(Italy) F Volandri	6	0
(France) M Gicquel	1	0^{r}
(Spain) R Ramírez Hidalgo	5	6	6
(Spain) F Vicente	7	0	1
Q	(Italy) F Cipolla	2	1
(Czech Republic) J Hernych	6	6
(Spain) A Portas	7^{7}	6^{5}	7
2	(Spain) JC Ferrero	6^{4}	7^{7}	5

Second round
(Switzerland) S Wawrinka	6	2	6
WC	(Croatia) M Čilić	4	6	4
WC	(Argentina) JM del Potro	2	6	6
(Czech Republic) R Vik	6	4	3
8	(Italy) F Volandri	4	7^{7}	7^{7}
(Spain) R Ramírez Hidalgo	6	6^{4}	6^{5}
(Czech Republic) J Hernych	7	4	2
(Spain) A Portas	5	6	6

Quarterfinals
(Switzerland) S Wawrinka	6	2	6
WC	(Argentina) JM del Potro	1	6	4
8	(Italy) F Volandri	7^{7}	6
(Spain) A Portas	6^{4}	4

Semifinals
(Switzerland) S Wawrinka	7	2	6
8	(Italy) F Volandri	5	6	4
