= 2010 ATP Studena Croatia Open Umag =

- Date: 26 July – 1 August
- Edition: 21st
- Category: ATP World Tour 250
- Draw: 32S / 16D
- Prize money: € 450,000
- Surface: Clay / outdoor
- Location: Umag, Croatia
- Venue: International Tennis Center

Champions

Singles
- (Spain) Juan Carlos Ferrero

Doubles
- (Czech Republic) Leoš Friedl / (Slovakia) Filip Polášek
← 2009 ·	Croatia Open	· 2011 →

The 2010 Studena Croatia Open Umag was a tennis tournament played on outdoor clay courts. It was the 21st edition of the Croatia Open Umag, and was part of the ATP World Tour 250 Series of the 2010 ATP World Tour. It took place at the International Tennis Center in Umag, Croatia, from 26 July through 1 August 2010. Fourth-seeded Juan Carlos Ferrero won the singles title.

== Finals ==
=== Singles ===
(Spain) Juan Carlos Ferrero defeated (Italy) Potito Starace, 6–4, 6–4

- It was Ferrero's third title of the year and 15th of his career.

=== Doubles ===
(Czech Republic) Leoš Friedl / (Slovakia) Filip Polášek defeated (Czech Republic) František Čermák / (Slovakia) Michal Mertiňák, 6–3, 7–6^{(9–7)}

== ATP entrants ==
=== Seeds ===
Player	Nation	Ranking*	Seeding
Nikolay Davydenko	RUS	6	1
Jürgen Melzer	AUT	15	2
Ivan Ljubičić	CRO	16	3
Juan Carlos Ferrero	ESP	21	4
Philipp Petzschner	GER	37	5
Alexandr Dolgopolov	UKR	39	6
Sergiy Stakhovsky	UKR	48	7
Juan Ignacio Chela	ARG	53	8

*Seedings based on the July 19, 2010 rankings.

=== Other entrants ===
The following players received wildcards into the singles main draw:

- (Croatia) Ivan Dodig
- (Croatia) Franko Škugor
- (Croatia) Antonio Veić

The following players received entry from the qualifying draw:

- (Italy) Simone Bolelli
- (Austria) Gerald Melzer
- (France) Olivier Patience
- (Italy) Simone Vagnozzi
