= 2004 Croatia Open =

- Date: 19–25 July
- Edition: 15th
- Category: International Series
- Draw: 32S / 16D
- Prize money: $375,000
- Surface: Clay / outdoor
- Location: Umag, Croatia
- Venue: ITC Stella Maris

Champions

Singles
- (Argentina) Guillermo Cañas

Doubles
- (Argentina) José Acasuso / (Brazil) Flávio Saretta
← 2003 ·	Croatia Open	· 2005 →

The 2004 Croatia Open was a men's tennis tournament played on outdoor clay courts at the ITC Stella Maris in Umag in Croatia and was part of the International Series of the 2004 ATP Tour. It was the 15th edition of the tournament and was held from 19 July through 25 July 2004. Sixth-seeded Guillermo Cañas won the singles title.

== Finals ==
=== Singles ===
(Argentina) Guillermo Cañas defeated (Italy) Filippo Volandri 7–5, 6–3

=== Doubles ===
(Argentina) José Acasuso / (Brazil) Flávio Saretta defeated (Czech Republic) Jaroslav Levinský / (Czech Republic) David Škoch 4–6, 6–2, 6–4
