= 2005 Croatia Open Umag =

Croatian men's tennis tournament

- Date: 25–31 July
- Edition: 16th
- Category: International Series
- Draw: 32S / 16D
- Prize money: $375,000
- Surface: Clay / outdoor
- Location: Umag, Croatia

Champions

Singles
- (Argentina) Guillermo Coria

Doubles
- (Czech Republic) Jiří Novák / (Czech Republic) Petr Pála
← 2004 ·	Croatia Open	· 2006 →

The 2005 Croatia Open Umag was a men's tennis tournament played on outdoor clay courts. It was the 16th edition of the Croatia Open Umag, and was part of the International Series of the 2005 ATP Tour. It took place at the International Tennis Center in Umag, Croatia, from 25 July through 31 July 2005. Second-seeded Guillermo Coria won the singles title.

== Finals ==
=== Singles ===
(Argentina) Guillermo Coria defeated (Spain) Carlos Moyá 6–2, 4–6, 6–2

- It was Coria's 1st singles title of the year, and the 9th and last of his career.

=== Doubles ===
(Czech Republic) Jiří Novák / (Czech Republic) Petr Pála defeated (Slovakia) Michal Mertiňák / (Czech Republic) David Škoch, 6–3, 6–3

- It was Novák's 1st title of the year and the 17th of his career. It was Pála's 1st title of the year and the 4th of his career.
