= 2005 Croatia Open Umag – Singles =

Singles
- 2005 Croatia Open Umag
- 2004 Champion: (Argentina) Guillermo Cañas

Final
- Champion: (Argentina) Guillermo Coria
- Runner-up: (Spain) Carlos Moyá
- Score: 6–2, 4–6, 6–2

Details
- Draw: 32 (4 Q / 3 WC )
- Seeds: 8

Events
Singles	Doubles
← 2004 ·	Croatia Open	· 2006 →

Guillermo Cañas was the defending champion, but did not participate.

Guillermo Coria won the title, defeating Carlos Moyá 6–2, 4–6, 6–2 in the final.

== Seeds ==
1. (Spain) Rafael Nadal (withdrew due to knee tendinitis)
2. (Argentina) Guillermo Coria (champion)
3. (Spain) Tommy Robredo (quarterfinals)
4. (Spain) David Ferrer (quarterfinals)
5. (Czech Republic) Jiří Novák (semifinals)
6. (Spain) Carlos Moyá (final)
7. (Spain) Juan Carlos Ferrero (quarterfinals)
8. (Italy) Filippo Volandri (semifinals)
9. (Spain) Alberto Martín (first round)

== Draw ==
=== Key ===
- Q = Qualifier
- WC = Wild card
- LL = Lucky loser
- Alt = Alternate
- ITF = ITF entry
- PR = Protected ranking
- SR = Special ranking
- SE = Special exempt
- JE = Junior exempt
- JR = Junior Accelerator Programme entrant
- CO = College Accelerator Programme entrant
- NG = Next Gen Accelerator Program entrant
- w/o = Walkover
- r = Retired
- d = Defaulted

=== Finals ===
Semifinals
5	(Czech Republic) Jiří Novák	4	4
6	(Spain) Carlos Moyá	6	6
8	(Italy) Filippo Volandri	6	3	2
2	(Argentina) Guillermo Coria	4	6	6

Final
6	(Spain) Carlos Moyá	2	6	2
2	(Argentina) Guillermo Coria	6	4	6

=== Top half ===
First round
9	(Spain) A Martín	5	3
(Czech Republic) L Dlouhý	7	6
(Italy) F Aldi	3	3
Q	(Serbia and Montenegro) I Bozoljac	6	6
(Czech Republic) J Vaněk	1	0
Q	(Spain) A Portas	6	6
(Spain) A Montañés	3	3
5	(Czech Republic) J Novák	6	6
4	(Spain) D Ferrer	6	3	6
(Italy) P Starace	3	6	2
(Spain) F Vicente	6	6
Q	(Romania) V Ioniță	2	2
(Belgium) K Vliegen	7	6
WC	(Croatia) M Čilić	5	2
(Czech Republic) B Ulihrach	2	0^{r}
6	(Spain) C Moyá	6	0

Second round
(Czech Republic) L Dlouhý	6	6
Q	(Serbia and Montenegro) I Bozoljac	3	2
Q	(Spain) A Portas	0	6	5
5	(Czech Republic) J Novák	6	4	7
4	(Spain) D Ferrer	6	6
(Spain) F Vicente	2	3
(Belgium) K Vliegen	3	1
6	(Spain) C Moyá	6	6

Quarterfinals
(Czech Republic) L Dlouhý	0	3
5	(Czech Republic) J Novák	6	6
4	(Spain) D Ferrer	4	6	3
6	(Spain) C Moyá	6	0	6

Semifinals
5	(Czech Republic) J Novák	4	4
6	(Spain) C Moyá	6	6

=== Bottom half ===
First round
8	(Italy) F Volandri	6	6
WC	(Croatia) S Tuksar	2	1
(Spain) Ó Hernández	2	2
(Spain) G García-López	6	6
(Belgium) D Norman	0	0
(Serbia and Montenegro) J Tipsarević	6	6
WC	(Brazil) G Kuerten	4	4
3	(Spain) T Robredo	6	6
7	(Spain) JC Ferrero	6	3
(Finland) J Nieminen	0	1^{r}
(Spain) Á Calatrava	1	4
(Serbia and Montenegro) N Djokovic	6	6
LL	(United Kingdom) A Mackin	2	1
(Spain) F Mantilla	6	6
Q	(Croatia) Ž Krajan	7	3	4
2	(Argentina) G Coria	5	6	6

Second round
8	(Italy) F Volandri	6	6
(Spain) G García-López	1	1
(Serbia and Montenegro) J Tipsarević	3	1
3	(Spain) T Robredo	6	6
7	(Spain) JC Ferrero	6	6
(Serbia and Montenegro) N Djokovic	4	2
(Spain) F Mantilla	6	2	1
2	(Argentina) G Coria	3	6	6

Quarterfinals
8	(Italy) F Volandri	3	6	6
3	(Spain) T Robredo	6	3	3
7	(Spain) JC Ferrero	3	0
2	(Argentina) G Coria	6	6

Semifinals
8	(Italy) F Volandri	6	3	2
2	(Argentina) G Coria	4	6	6
