= 2010 Aspria Tennis Cup – Singles =

Singles
- 2010 Aspria Tennis Cup

Final
- Champion: (Portugal) Frederico Gil
- Runner-up: (Argentina) Máximo González
- Score: 6–1, 7–5

Events
| Singles | Doubles |
- Aspria Tennis Cup

Alessio di Mauro was the defending champion, but he lost in the first round against Mikhail Kukushkin in the first round.
Frederico Gil won in the final 6–1, 7–5 against Máximo González.

== Seeds ==
1. (Portugal) Frederico Gil (champion)
2. (Italy) Filippo Volandri (first round)
3. (Kazakhstan) Mikhail Kukushkin (quarterfinals)
4. (Spain) Rubén Ramírez Hidalgo (semifinals)
5. (Spain) Alberto Martín (second round)
6. (Spain) Pablo Andújar (second round)
7. (Argentina) Federico Delbonis (second round)
8. (Romania) Adrian Ungur (quarterfinals, retired)

== Draw ==
Key

- Q = Qualifier
- WC = Wild card
- LL = Lucky loser
- Alt = Alternate
- ITF = ITF entry
- PR = Protected ranking
- SR = Special ranking
- SE = Special exempt
- JE = Junior exempt
- JR = Junior Accelerator Programme entrant
- CO = College Accelerator Programme entrant
- NG = Next Gen Accelerator Program entrant
- w/o = Walkover
- r = Retired
- d = Defaulted

=== Finals ===
Semifinals
1 | (Portugal) Frederico Gil | 6 | 6
4 | (Spain) Rubén Ramírez Hidalgo | 2 | 1
(Argentina) Diego Junqueira | 6 | 4 | 5
(Argentina) Máximo González | 2 | 6 | 7

Final
1 | (Portugal) Frederico Gil | 6 | 7
(Argentina) Máximo González | 1 | 5

=== Top half ===
First round
1 | (Portugal) F Gil | 6 | 4 | 7
(Romania) P Luncanu | 4 | 6 | 5
Q | (Russia) E Donskoy | 6 | 6
(Romania) V Crivoi | 4 | 0
(Spain) C Poch-Gradin | 6^{5} | 3
(Argentina) C Berlocq | 7 | 6
(Italy) A Brizzi | 3 | 1
7 | (Argentina) F Delbonis | 6 | 6
4 | (Spain) R Ramírez Hidalgo | 7 | 6
Q | (Switzerland) Y Marti | 6^{3} | 2
(Italy) D Giorgini | 6 | 6
WC | (Italy) E Fioravante | 3 | 1
Q | (Mexico) B Rodríguez | 6 | 2 | 2
(Argentina) G Gaudio | 4 | 6 | 6
Q | (Germany) M Sieber | 3 | 6 | 5
5 | (Spain) A Martín | 6 | 1 | 7

Second round
1 | (Portugal) F Gil | 6^{0} | 6 | 6
Q | (Russia) E Donskoy | 7 | 3 | 4
(Argentina) C Berlocq | 6 | 6
7 | (Argentina) F Delbonis | 3 | 2
4 | (Spain) R Ramírez Hidalgo | 6 | 6
(Italy) D Giorgini | 2 | 3
(Argentina) G Gaudio | 6 | 3 | 6
5 | (Spain) A Martín | 3 | 6 | 3

Quarterfinals
1 | (Portugal) F Gil | 6 | 6
(Argentina) C Berlocq | 0 | 3
4 | (Spain) R Ramírez Hidalgo | 7 | 4 | 6
(Argentina) G Gaudio | 5 | 6 | 4

Semifinals
1 | (Portugal) F Gil | 6 | 6
4 | (Spain) R Ramírez Hidalgo | 2 | 1

=== Bottom half ===
First round
6 | (Spain) P Andújar | 6 | 6
(Italy) M Crugnola | 1 | 2
WC | (Italy) F Colangelo | 4 | 2
(Argentina) D Junqueira | 6 | 6
(Colombia) C Salamanca | 6^{0} | 6 | 6
(Italy) A Arnaboldi | 7 | 2 | 0
(Italy) A di Mauro | 5 | 1
3 | (Kazakhstan) M Kukushkin | 7 | 6
8 | (Romania) A Ungur | 6 | 6
WC | (Italy) R Marcora | 2 | 0
(Colombia) A González | 6 | 2 | 4
(France) V Millot | 3 | 6 | 6
(France) L Recouderc | 6 | 4 | 1
(Argentina) M González | 3 | 6 | 6
WC | (Italy) G Naso | 6 | 3 | 6
2 | (Italy) F Volandri | 3 | 6 | 3

Second round
6 | (Spain) P Andújar | 0 | 6^{1}
(Argentina) D Junqueira | 6 | 7
(Colombia) C Salamanca | 4 | 0
3 | (Kazakhstan) M Kukushkin | 6 | 6
8 | (Romania) A Ungur | 6 | 6
(France) V Millot | 4 | 4
(Argentina) M González | 6 | 6
WC | (Italy) G Naso | 3 | 3

Quarterfinals
(Argentina) D Junqueira | 6 | 3 | 6
3 | (Kazakhstan) M Kukushkin | 3 | 6 | 3
8 | (Romania) A Ungur | 4 | 1 | r
(Argentina) M González | 6 | 4

Semifinals
(Argentina) D Junqueira | 6 | 4 | 5
(Argentina) M González | 2 | 6 | 7
