= 2007 Croatia Open Umag – Singles =

Singles
- 2007 Croatia Open Umag
- 2006 Champion: (Switzerland) Stan Wawrinka

Final
- Champion: (Spain) Carlos Moyá
- Runner-up: (Romania) Andrei Pavel
- Score: 6–4, 6–2

Details
- Draw: 32 (4 Q / 3 WC )
- Seeds: 8

Events
Singles	Doubles
← 2006 ·	Croatia Open	· 2008 →

Carlos Moyá defeated Andrei Pavel in the final, 6–4, 6–2 to win the singles title at the 2007 Croatia Open Umag.

Stan Wawrinka was the defending champion, but lost to Moyá in the first round.

== Seeds ==
1. (Serbia) Novak Djokovic (second round)
2. (Russia) Nikolay Davydenko (first round)
3. (Croatia) Ivan Ljubičić (first round)
4. (Spain) David Ferrer (quarterfinals)
5. (Argentina) Guillermo Cañas (semifinals)
6. (Spain) Carlos Moyá (champion)
7. (Italy) Filippo Volandri (quarterfinals)
8. (Serbia) Janko Tipsarević (first round)

== Draw ==
=== Key ===
- Q = Qualifier
- WC = Wild card
- LL = Lucky loser
- Alt = Alternate
- ITF = ITF entry
- PR = Protected ranking
- SR = Special ranking
- SE = Special exempt
- JE = Junior exempt
- JR = Junior Accelerator Programme entrant
- CO = College Accelerator Programme entrant
- NG = Next Gen Accelerator Program entrant
- w/o = Walkover
- r = Retired
- d = Defaulted

=== Finals ===
Semifinals
Q	(Serbia) Viktor Troicki	3	3
(Romania) Andrei Pavel	6	6
6	(Spain) Carlos Moyá	6	6
5	(Argentina) Guillermo Cañas	3	2

Final
(Romania) Andrei Pavel	4	2
6	(Spain) Carlos Moyá	6	6

=== Section 1 ===
First round
1	(Serbia) N Djokovic	6	6
Q	(Spain) P Andújar	1	3
Q	(Serbia) V Troicki	6	1	6
LL	(North Macedonia) P Rusevski	3	6	4
(Argentina) C Berlocq	6	6
Q	(Argentina) M González	3	4
(Romania) V Hănescu	2
8	(Serbia) J Tipsarević	0^{r}
3	(Croatia) I Ljubičić	6^{5}	5
(Romania) A Pavel	7^{7}	7
SE	(Netherlands) R Haase	2	6	6
(Spain) F Mantilla	6	4	4
(Germany) M Zverev	6	7
(France) F Serra	0	5
(Czech Republic) L Dlouhý	2	1
7	(Italy) F Volandri	6	6

Second round
1	(Serbia) N Djokovic	6	4	5
Q	(Serbia) V Troicki	2	6	7
(Argentina) C Berlocq	6^{13}	6	6
(Romania) V Hănescu	7^{15}	4	2
(Romania) A Pavel	7	6
SE	(Netherlands) R Haase	5	4
(Germany) M Zverev	6^{2}	5
7	(Italy) F Volandri	7^{7}	7

Quarterfinals
Q	(Serbia) V Troicki	7	6
(Argentina) C Berlocq	5	2
(Romania) A Pavel	1	6	6
7	(Italy) F Volandri	6	2	3

Semifinals
Q	(Serbia) V Troicki	3	3
(Romania) A Pavel	6	6

=== Section 2 ===
First round
6	(Spain) C Moyá	6	6
WC	(Switzerland) S Wawrinka	3	2
WC	(Croatia) L Belic	2	6	4
Q	(Spain) P Riba	6	2	6
(France) É Roger-Vasselin	2	0
(Argentina) J Acasuso	6	6
(Spain) Montañés	2	2
4	(Spain) D Ferrer	6	6
5	(Argentina) G Cañas	6	6
WC	(Croatia) R Karanušić	3	3
(Argentina) G Gaudio	0	4
(Spain) R Ramírez Hidalgo	6	6
(Croatia) M Čilić	3	6	6
(France) M Montcourt	6	4	1
(France) G Simon	6	2	6
2	(Russia) N Davydenko	2	6	3

Second round
6	(Spain) C Moyá	6	6
Q	(Spain) P Riba	0	3
(Argentina) J Acasuso	6	6^{4}	2
4	(Spain) D Ferrer	2	7^{7}	6
5	(Argentina) G Cañas	6	6
(Spain) R Ramírez Hidalgo	4	3
(Croatia) M Čilić	5	6	3
(France) G Simon	7	2	6

Quarterfinals
6	(Spain) C Moyá	7	6
4	(Spain) D Ferrer	5	4
5	(Argentina) G Cañas	6	6
(France) G Simon	2	1

Semifinals
6	(Spain) C Moyá	6	6
5	(Argentina) G Cañas	3	2
