= 2005 Croatia Open Umag – Doubles =

Doubles
- 2005 Croatia Open Umag
- 2004 Champions: (Argentina) José Acasuso (Brazil) Flávio Saretta

Final
- Champions: (Czech Republic) Jiří Novák (Czech Republic) Petr Pála
- Runners-up: (Slovakia) Michal Mertiňák (Czech Republic) David Škoch
- Score: 6–3, 6–3

Details
- Draw: 16
- Seeds: 4

Events
Singles	Doubles
← 2004 ·	Croatia Open	· 2006 →

José Acasuso and Flávio Saretta were the defending champions, but none competed this year.

Jiří Novák and Petr Pála won the title by defeating Michal Mertiňák and David Škoch 6–3, 6–3 in the final.

== Seeds ==
1. (Czech Republic) Jiří Novák / (Czech Republic) Petr Pála (champions)
2. (Poland) Mariusz Fyrstenberg / (Poland) Marcin Matkowski (first round)
3. (Italy) Massimo Bertolini / (Belgium) Tom Vanhoudt (first round)
4. (Finland) Jarkko Nieminen / (Netherlands) Rogier Wassen (quarterfinals)

== Draw ==
=== Key ===
- Q = Qualifier
- WC = Wild card
- LL = Lucky loser
- Alt = Alternate
- ITF = ITF entry
- PR = Protected ranking
- SR = Special ranking
- SE = Special exempt
- JE = Junior exempt
- JR = Junior Accelerator Programme entrant
- CO = College Accelerator Programme entrant
- NG = Next Gen Accelerator Program entrant
- w/o = Walkover
- r = Retired
- d = Defaulted

=== Draw ===
First round
1	(Czech Republic) J Novák (Czech Republic) P Pála	6	6
(Serbia and Montenegro) I Bozoljac (Slovenia) M Tkalec	2	1
(Slovakia) L Švarc (Italy) S Vagnozzi	2	2
WC	(Serbia and Montenegro) N Djokovic (Serbia and Montenegro) J Tipsarević	6	6
3	(Italy) M Bertolini (Belgium) T Vanhoudt	7^{7}	0	6^{6}
(Switzerland) JC Scherrer (Belgium) K Vliegen	6^{4}	6	7^{8}
(Spain) A Montañés (Spain) A Portas	1	2
(United States) Goran Dragicevic (United States) M Pehar	6	6
WC	(Latvia) E Gulbis (Croatia) F Škugor	1	4
(Spain) D Ferrer (Spain) F Vicente	6	6
(Czech Republic) L Dlohuý (Czech Republic) J Vaněk	4	2
4	(Finland) J Nieminen (Netherlands) R Wassen	6	6
(Italy) F Colangelo (Italy) A Motti	1	6^{6}
(Spain) Á Calatrava (Spain) Á López Morón	6	7^{8}
(Slovakia) M Mertiňák (Czech Republic) D Škoch	4	6	7
2	(Poland) M Fyrstenberg (Poland) M Matkowski	6	4	5

Quarterfinals
1	(Czech Republic) J Novák (Czech Republic) P Pála	6	6
WC	(Serbia and Montenegro) N Djokovic (Serbia and Montenegro) J Tipsarević	4	3
(Switzerland) JC Scherrer (Belgium) K Vliegen	0	6	7^{7}
(United States) Goran Dragicevic (United States) M Pehar	6	2	6^{5}
(Spain) D Ferrer (Spain) F Vicente	6	6
4	(Finland) J Nieminen (Netherlands) R Wassen	2	4
(Spain) Á Calatrava (Spain) Á López Morón	7^{7}	2	3
(Slovakia) M Mertiňák (Czech Republic) D Škoch	6^{4}	6	6

Semifinals
1	(Czech Republic) J Novák (Czech Republic) P Pála	7^{7}	7^{7}
(Switzerland) JC Scherrer (Belgium) K Vliegen	6^{2}	6^{1}
(Spain) D Ferrer (Spain) F Vicente	1	4
(Slovakia) M Mertiňák (Czech Republic) D Škoch	6	6

Final
1	(Czech Republic) J Novák (Czech Republic) P Pála	6	6
(Slovakia) M Mertiňák (Czech Republic) D Škoch	3	3
