= 2007 Croatia Open Umag – Doubles =

Doubles
- 2007 Croatia Open Umag
- 2006 Champions: (Czech Republic) Jaroslav Levinský; (Czech Republic) David Škoch

Final
- Champions: (Czech Republic) Lukáš Dlouhý (Slovakia) Michal Mertiňák
- Runners-up: (Czech Republic) Jaroslav Levinský (Czech Republic) David Škoch
- Score: 6–1, 6–1

Details
- Draw: 16
- Seeds: 4

Events
Singles	Doubles
← 2006 ·	Croatia Open	· 2008 →

The 2007 Croatia Open Umag was the 18th occurrence of the Croatia Open Umag tennis tournament, held on July 23–29.

== Seeds ==
Champion seeds are indicated in bold text while text in italics indicates the round in which those seeds were eliminated.

1. (Czech Republic) Jaroslav Levinský / (Czech Republic) David Škoch (final)
2. (Czech Republic) **Lukáš Dlouhý / (Slovakia) Michal Mertiňák (champions)**
3. (Spain) Albert Montañés / (Spain) Rubén Ramírez Hidalgo (first round)
4. (Argentina) José Acasuso / (Argentina) Máximo González (quarterfinals)

== Draw ==
=== Key ===
- Q = Qualifier
- WC = Wild card
- LL = Lucky loser
- Alt = Alternate
- ITF = ITF entry
- PR = Protected ranking
- SR = Special ranking
- SE = Special exempt
- JE = Junior exempt
- JR = Junior Accelerator Programme entrant
- CO = College Accelerator Programme entrant
- NG = Next Gen Accelerator Program entrant
- w/o = Walkover
- r = Retired
- d = Defaulted

=== Finals ===
First round
1	**(Czech Republic) J Levinský** **(Czech Republic) D Škoch**	**6**	**6**
(United Kingdom) J Delgado (Germany) M Zverev	4	1
(Croatia) R Karanušić (Serbia) V Troicki	**6**	5	[7]
**(Argentina) C Berlocq** **(Argentina) A Fabbri**	3	**7**	**[10]**
3	(Spain) A Montañés (Spain) R. Ramírez Hidalgo	3	5
**(Bosnia and Herzegovina) I Dodig** **(Germany) F Moser**	**6**	**7**
**(Romania) V Hănescu** **(Switzerland) J-C Scherrer**	**6**	**7**
WC	(Italy) P Fanucci (Italy) F Volandri	3	5
**(Croatia) M Čilić** **(Croatia) L Zovko**	**6**	**7**
(Netherlands) J Smit (Netherlands) M van Haasteren	4	6
Alt	(North Macedonia) P Rusevski (Serbia) G Tošić	4	2
4	**(Argentina) J Acasuso** **(Argentina) M González**	**6**	**6**
**(France) M Montcourt** **(France) E Roger-Vasselin**	**7**	**6**
WC	(Serbia) N Djokovic (Serbia) M Djokovic	5	1
(Poland) T Bednarek (Netherlands Antilles) J-J Rojer	5	6
2	**(Czech Republic) L Dlouhý** **(Slovakia) M Mertiňák**	**7**	**7**

Quarterfinals
1	**(Czech Republic) J Levinský** **(Czech Republic) D Škoch**	**6**	2	**[11]**
(Argentina) C Berlocq (Argentina) A Fabbri	0	**6**	[9]
(Bosnia and Herzegovina) I Dodig (Germany) F Moser	3	**6**	[7]
**(Romania) V Hănescu** **(Switzerland) J-C Scherrer**	**6**	1	**[10]**
**(Croatia) M Čilić** **(Croatia) L Zovko**	**6**
4	(Argentina) J Acasuso (Argentina) M González	2^{r}
(France) M Montcourt (France) E Roger-Vasselin	3	2
2	**(Czech Republic) L Dlouhý** **(Slovakia) M Mertiňák**	**6**	**6**

Semifinals
1	**(Czech Republic) J Levinský** **(Czech Republic) D Škoch**	5	**7**	**[13]**
(Romania) V Hănescu (Switzerland) J-C Scherrer	**7**	5	[11]
(Croatia) M Čilić (Croatia) L Zovko	3	2
2	**(Czech Republic) L Dlouhý** **(Slovakia) M Mertiňák**	**6**	**6**

Final
1	(Czech Republic) J Levinský (Czech Republic) D Škoch	1	1
2	**(Czech Republic) L Dlouhý** **(Slovakia) M Mertiňák**	**6**	**6**
