= 2006 Croatia Open Umag =

- Date: 24–30 July
- Edition: 17th
- Category: International Series
- Draw: 32S / 16D
- Prize money: $375,000
- Surface: Clay / outdoor
- Location: Umag, Croatia

Champions

Singles
- (Switzerland) Stan Wawrinka

Doubles
- (Czech Republic) Jaroslav Levinský / (Czech Republic) David Škoch
← 2005 ·	Croatia Open	· 2007 →

The 2006 Croatia Open Umag was the 17th edition of the Croatia Open Umag men's tennis tournament. The tournament was held on outdoor clay courts from 24 July until 30 July 2006. Guillermo Coria was the defending champion but lost in the first round. Unseeded Stan Wawrinka won his first title of his career after Novak Djokovic retired with breathing problems in the tiebreak of the first set.

== Finals ==
=== Singles ===
(Switzerland) Stan Wawrinka defeated (Serbia) Novak Djokovic, 6–6 RET

=== Doubles ===
(Czech Republic) Jaroslav Levinský / (Czech Republic) David Škoch defeated (Spain) Guillermo García López / (Spain) Albert Portas, 6–4, 6–4
