= 2004 Croatia Open – Singles =

Singles
- 2004 Croatia Open
- 2003 Champion: (Spain) Carlos Moyá

Final
- Champion: (Argentina) Guillermo Cañas
- Runner-up: (Italy) Filippo Volandri
- Score: 7–5, 6–3

Details
- Draw: 32 (4 Q / 3 WC )
- Seeds: 8

Events
Singles	Doubles
← 2003 ·	Croatia Open	· 2005 →

Guillermo Cañas defeated Filippo Volandri 7–5, 6–3 to win the singles title at the 2004 Croatia Open.

Carlos Moyá was the defending champion, but lost in the semifinals to Volandri.

This tournament marked the ATP Tour debut of future 24-time major champion and world No. 1 Novak Djokovic. He lost in the first round to Volandri after qualifying for the main draw.

== Seeds ==
1. (Spain) Carlos Moyá (semifinals)
2. (Czech Republic) Jiří Novák (quarterfinals)
3. (Russia) Igor Andreev (first round)
4. (Italy) Filippo Volandri (final)
5. (Spain) Alberto Martín (quarterfinals)
6. (Argentina) Guillermo Cañas (champion)
7. (Brazil) Flávio Saretta (second round)
8. (Slovakia) Karol Kučera (first round)

== Draw ==
=== Key ===
- Q = Qualifier
- WC = Wild card
- LL = Lucky loser
- Alt = Alternate
- ITF = ITF entry
- PR = Protected ranking
- SR = Special ranking
- SE = Special exempt
- JE = Junior exempt
- JR = Junior Accelerator Programme entrant
- CO = College Accelerator Programme entrant
- NG = Next Gen Accelerator Program entrant
- w/o = Walkover
- r = Retired
- d = Defaulted

=== Finals ===
Semifinals
1	(Spain) Carlos Moyá	3	2
4	(Italy) Filippo Volandri	6	6
6	(Argentina) Guillermo Cañas	6	6
(Spain) Guillermo García López	2	2

Final
4	(Italy) Filippo Volandri	5	3
6	(Argentina) Guillermo Cañas	7	6

=== Top half ===
First round
1	(Spain) C Moyá	6	6
WC	(Croatia) R Karanušić	4	4
WC	(Croatia) Ž Krajan	6	3	6
(Czech Republic) J Vaněk	0	6	3
(Spain) N Almagro	7^{7}	6
(Germany) T Behrend	6^{4}	4
(France) J Golmard	2	6	2
5	(Spain) A Martín	6	4	6
4	(Italy) F Volandri	7^{7}	6
Q	(Serbia and Montenegro) N Djokovic	6^{5}	1
(Czech Republic) B Ulihrach	3	1
Q	(France) F Serra	6	6
(France) O Mutis	0	2
(Belgium) K Vliegen	6	6
(Belgium) O Rochus	6	6
8	(Slovakia) K Kučera	2	2

Second round
1	(Spain) C Moyá	3
WC	(Croatia) Ž Krajan	3^{r}
(Spain) N Almagro	3	1
5	(Spain) A Martín	6	6
4	(Italy) F Volandri	7	6
Q	(France) F Serra	5	0
(Belgium) K Vliegen	7^{7}	3	6
(Belgium) O Rochus	6^{3}	6	4

Quarterfinals
1	(Spain) C Moyá	6	7^{7}
5	(Spain) A Martín	1	6^{2}
4	(Italy) F Volandri	6	6
(Belgium) K Vliegen	2	2

Semifinals
1	(Spain) C Moyá	3	2
4	(Italy) F Volandri	6	6

=== Bottom half ===
First round
6	(Argentina) G Cañas	6	6
(France) O Patience	3	2
Q	(Croatia) S Tuksar	7^{7}	4	3
WC	(Spain) F Vicente	6^{5}	6	6
(Spain) Á Calatrava	6	6
(France) A Di Pasquale	4	3
(Czech Republic) T Zíb	6	6
3	(Russia) I Andreev	3	4
7	(Brazil) F Saretta	6	6
Q	(Switzerland) S Wawrinka	3	1
(Spain) G García López	5	6	6
(Romania) V Hănescu	7	4	4
(Argentina) J Acasuso	3	5
(Belgium) C Rochus	6	7
(Spain) R Ramírez Hidalgo	4	2
2	(Czech Republic) J Novák	6	6

Second round
6	(Argentina) G Cañas	6	6
WC	(Spain) F Vicente	2	1
(Spain) Á Calatrava	7	6
(Czech Republic) T Zíb	5	3
7	(Brazil) F Saretta	5	0
(Spain) G García López	7	6
(Belgium) C Rochus	6	3	1
2	(Czech Republic) J Novák	4	6	6

Quarterfinals
6	(Argentina) G Cañas	6	7^{7}
(Spain) Á Calatrava	2	6^{4}
(Spain) G García López	6	6
2	(Czech Republic) J Novák	3	3

Semifinals
6	(Argentina) G Cañas	6	6
(Spain) G García López	2	2
