= 2009 ATP Studena Croatia Open Umag =

- Date: 27 July – 2 August
- Edition: 20th
- Category: International Series
- Draw: 32S / 16D
- Prize money: €398,250
- Surface: Clay / outdoor
- Location: Umag, Croatia

Champions

Singles
- (Russia) Nikolay Davydenko

Doubles
- (Czech Republic) František Čermák / (Slovakia) Michal Mertiňák
← 2008 ·	Croatia Open	· 2010 →

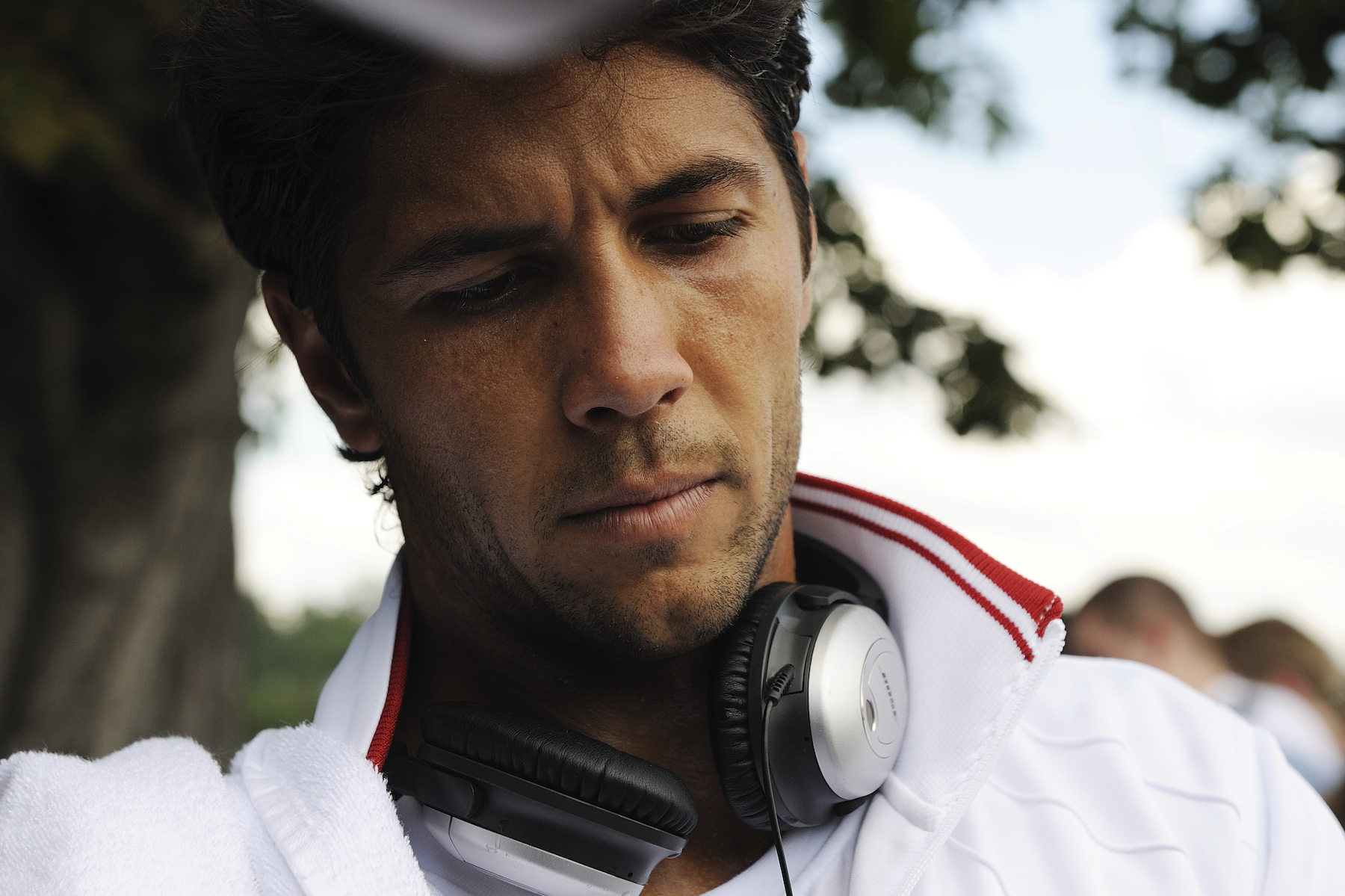
ATP World Tour No. 9 Fernando Verdasco did not defend his 2008 title in Umag.

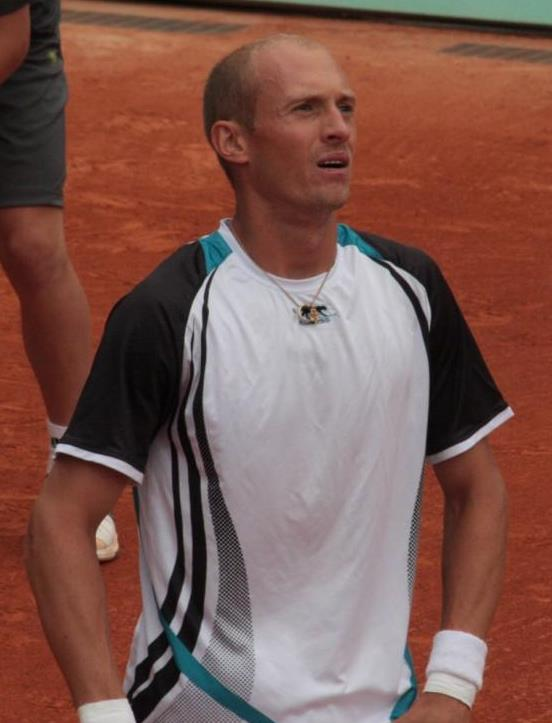
French Open quarterfinalist Nikolay Davydenko headlined the singles field in 2009.

The 2009 ATP Studena Croatia Open Umag was a tennis tournament played on outdoor red clay courts. It was the 20th edition of the event known that year as the ATP Studena Croatia Open Umag and was part of the ATP World Tour 250 series of the 2009 ATP World Tour. It took place at the International Tennis Center in Umag, Croatia, from 27 July through 2 August 2009. First-seeded Nikolay Davydenko won the singles title.

== Finals ==
=== Singles ===
(Russia) Nikolay Davydenko defeated (Spain) Juan Carlos Ferrero, 6–3, 6–0

- It was Davydenko's second title of the year and 16th of his career.

=== Doubles ===
(Czech Republic) František Čermák / (Slovakia) Michal Mertiňák defeated (Sweden) Johan Brunström / (Netherlands Antilles) Jean-Julien Rojer, 6–4, 6–4

== Entrants ==
=== Seeds ===
Country	Player	Rank	Seed
RUS	Nikolay Davydenko	12	1
ESP	David Ferrer	23	2
SRB	Viktor Troicki	26	3
AUT	Jürgen Melzer	33	4
ESP	Juan Carlos Ferrero	35	5
ESP	Nicolás Almagro	40	6
ITA	Andreas Seppi	46	7
GER	Mischa Zverev	47	8

*Seedings based on the July 20, 2009 rankings.

=== Other entrants ===
The following players received wildcards into the singles main draw

- (Croatia) Ivan Dodig
- (Slovenia) Blaž Kavčič
- (Italy) Filippo Volandri

The following players received entry from the qualifying draw:

- (Spain) Marcel Granollers
- (Spain) Rubén Ramírez Hidalgo
- (Slovakia) Martin Kližan
- (Argentina) Juan Ignacio Chela

== Notes ==
- ^{a} Players' rankings, as of Monday, July 20, 2009.
- ^{b} Projected seeding based on the Monday, July 20, 2009, rankings.
