= 2010 ATP Studena Croatia Open Umag – Doubles =

Doubles
- 2010 ATP Studena Croatia Open Umag
- 2009 Champions: (Czech Republic) František Čermák (Slovakia) Michal Mertiňák

Final
- Champions: (Czech Republic) Leoš Friedl; (Slovakia) Filip Polášek
- Runners-up: (Czech Republic) František Čermák; (Slovakia) Michal Mertiňák
- Score: 6–3, 7–6^{(9–7)}

Details
- Draw: 16
- Seeds: 4

Events
Singles	Doubles
← 2009 ·	Croatia Open	· 2011 →

František Čermák and Michal Mertiňák unsuccessfully defended their title, after lost to Leoš Friedl and Filip Polášek in the final 3–6, 6–7^{(7–9)}.

== Seeds ==
1. (Austria) Jürgen Melzer / (Germany) Philipp Petzschner (quarterfinals)
2. (Czech Republic) František Čermák / (Slovakia) Michal Mertiňák (final)
3. (Argentina) Juan Ignacio Chela / (Uruguay) Pablo Cuevas (quarterfinals)
4. (Germany) Philipp Marx / (Slovakia) Igor Zelenay (first round)

== Draw ==
=== Key ===
- Q = Qualifier
- WC = Wild card
- LL = Lucky loser
- Alt = Alternate
- ITF = ITF entry
- PR = Protected ranking
- SR = Special ranking
- SE = Special exempt
- JE = Junior exempt
- JR = Junior Accelerator Programme entrant
- CO = College Accelerator Programme entrant
- NG = Next Gen Accelerator Program entrant
- w/o = Walkover
- r = Retired
- d = Defaulted

=== Draw ===
First round

Quarterfinals

Semifinals

Finals

1
- (Austria) J Melzer
- (Germany) P Petzschner
3
6
[10]

- (Italy) F Fognini
- (Ukraine) S Stakhovsky
6
4
[7]

1
- (Austria) J Melzer
- (Germany) P Petzschner
1
3

- (Czech Republic) L Friedl
- (Slovakia) F Polášek
6^{3}
6
[12]

(Czech Republic) L Friedl
(Slovakia) F Polášek
6
6

- (Spain) D Marrero
- (Spain) R Ramírez Hidalgo
7^{7}
4
[10]

(Czech Republic) L Friedl
(Slovakia) F Polášek
6
3
[10]

3
(Argentina) JI Chela
(Uruguay) P Cuevas
6
6

- (Argentina) M González
- (Argentina) S Prieto
3
6
[7]

WC
- (Croatia) F Škugor
- (Croatia) I Zovko
3
2

3
- (Argentina) JI Chela
- (Uruguay) P Cuevas
5
4

- (Czech Republic) J Hájek
- (Czech Republic) D Škoch
6
2
[8]

(Argentina) M González
(Argentina) S Prieto
7
6

(Argentina) M González
(Argentina) S Prieto
1
6
[10]

- (Czech Republic) L Friedl
- (Slovakia) F Polášek
6
7^{9}

(South Africa) J Coetzee
(United Kingdom) J Murray
7^{7}
6

2
- (Czech Republic) F Čermák
- (Slovakia) M Mertiňák
3
6^{7}

- (Ukraine) A Dolgopolov
- (France) S Robert
6^{4}
1

(South Africa) J Coetzee
(United Kingdom) J Murray
6
6

- (Italy) S Bolelli
- (Italy) P Starace
7
6

- (Italy) S Bolelli
- (Italy) P Starace
2
3

4
- (Germany) P Marx
- (Slovakia) I Zelenay
5
3

- (South Africa) J Coetzee
- (United Kingdom) J Murray
5
3

WC
(Croatia) M Draganja
(Croatia) D Marcan
3
6
[10]

2
(Czech Republic) F Čermák
(Slovakia) M Mertiňák
7
6

- (Poland) T Bednarek
- (Poland) M Kowalczyk
6
4
[5]

WC
- (Croatia) M Draganja
- (Croatia) D Marcan
4
2

- (Italy) A Seppi
- (Italy) S Vagnozzi
1
6
[5]

2
- (Czech Republic) F Čermák
- (Slovakia) M Mertiňák
6
6

2
(Czech Republic) F Čermák
(Slovakia) M Mertiňák
6
4
[10]
