= 2007 Croatia Open Umag =

- Date: 23–29 July
- Edition: 18th
- Category: International Series
- Draw: 32S / 16D
- Prize money: $391,000
- Surface: Clay / outdoor
- Location: Umag, Croatia

Champions

Singles
- (Spain) Carlos Moyà

Doubles
- (Slovakia) Lukáš Dlouhý / (Czech Republic) Michal Mertiňák
← 2006 ·	Croatia Open	· 2008 →

The 2007 Croatia Open Umag was the 18th edition of the Croatia Open Umag men's tennis tournament. The tournament was held from 23 July until 29 July 2007 in Umag, Croatia and was part of the International Series tier of the 2007 ATP Tour. Sixth-seeded Carlos Moyà won four times previously, making him one of only eight men to have won five titles at a single event in the open era.

== Finals ==
=== Singles ===
(Spain) Carlos Moyà defeated (Romania) Andrei Pavel, 6–4, 6–2

- It was Moyà's only singles title of the year and the 20th of his career.

=== Doubles ===
(Czech Republic) Lukáš Dlouhý / (Slovakia) Michal Mertiňák defeated (Czech Republic) Jaroslav Levinský / (Czech Republic) David Škoch, 6–1, 6–1
