= 2013 Aspria Tennis Cup – Trofeo CDI – Singles =

Trofeo CDI – Singles
- 2013 Aspria Tennis Cup – Trofeo CDI

Final
- Champion: (Italy) Filippo Volandri
- Runner-up: (Slovakia) Andrej Martin
- Score: 6–3, 6–2

Events
Singles	Doubles
- Aspria Tennis Cup

Tommy Robredo was the defending champion, but decided not to participate.

Filippo Volandri won the final against Andrej Martin 6–3, 6–2.

== Seeds ==
1. (Italy) Filippo Volandri (champion)
2. (Argentina) Diego Sebastián Schwartzman (first round)
3. (Ukraine) Ivan Sergeyev (first round)
4. (Kazakhstan) Andrey Golubev (first round)
5. (Turkey) Marsel İlhan (first round)
6. (Italy) Potito Starace (second round)
7. (Ecuador) Julio César Campozano (quarterfinals)
8. (Japan) Taro Daniel (second round)

== Draw ==
Key

- Q = Qualifier
- WC = Wild card
- LL = Lucky loser
- Alt = Alternate
- ITF = ITF entry
- PR = Protected ranking
- SR = Special ranking
- SE = Special exempt
- JE = Junior exempt
- JR = Junior Accelerator Programme entrant
- CO = College Accelerator Programme entrant
- NG = Next Gen Accelerator Program entrant
- w/o = Walkover
- r = Retired
- d = Defaulted

=== Finals ===
Semifinals
1	(Italy) Filippo Volandri	6	3	7
(Italy) Andrea Arnaboldi	3	6	5
Q	(Slovakia) Andrej Martin	6	0	6
(Slovakia) Norbert Gombos	1	6	3

Final
1	(Italy) Filippo Volandri	6	6
Q	(Slovakia) Andrej Martin	3	2

=== Top half ===
First round
1	(Italy) F Volandri	6	7^{8}
Q	(United Kingdom) O Golding	1	6^{6}
Q	(Argentina) M González	6	7
(France) M Teixeira	1	5
WC	(Italy) G Quinzi	6	0	6^{6}
(Australia) A Bolt	4	6	7^{8}
(Germany) P Torebko	3	3
7	(Ecuador) JC Campozano	6	6
4	(Kazakhstan) A Golubev	7	3	4
Q	(Serbia) F Krajinović	5	6	6
(Italy) R Bellotti	6	4
(Argentina) Leandro Migani	1	3^{r}
(Croatia) T Androić	0	3
(Italy) A Arnaboldi	6	6
(Switzerland) S Ehrat	6	2	2
8	(Japan) T Daniel	4	6	6

Second round
1	(Italy) F Volandri	7	4	1
Q	(Argentina) M González	5	6	0^{r}
(Australia) A Bolt	6^{2}	3
7	(Ecuador) JC Campozano	7^{7}	6
Q	(Serbia) F Krajinović	6	7^{8}
(Italy) R Bellotti	2	6^{6}
(Italy) A Arnaboldi	6^{5}	6	6
8	(Japan) T Daniel	7^{7}	2	2

Quarterfinals
1	(Italy) F Volandri	6	4
7	(Ecuador) JC Campozano	4	1^{r}
Q	(Serbia) F Krajinović	3	7	2
(Italy) A Arnaboldi	6	5	6

Semifinals
1	(Italy) F Volandri	6	3	7
(Italy) A Arnaboldi	3	6	5

=== Bottom half ===
First round
6	(Italy) P Starace	6	6
WC	(Italy) A Bega	4	2
(Slovakia) M Mečíř	4	2
Q	(Slovakia) A Martin	6	6
(Argentina) A Molteni	6	4	3
(Italy) S Vagnozzi	4	6	6
WC	(Italy) M Trevisan	6	0	6
3	(Ukraine) I Sergeyev	1	6	1
4	(Turkey) M İlhan	4	6^{6}
(Venezuela) R Rodríguez	6	7^{8}
(Germany) N Langer	1	5
(Slovakia) N Gombos	6	7
(Germany) T Pütz	1	6	6
SE	(Czech Republic) I Minář	6	3	0
WC	(Italy) Riccardo Sinicropi	6	6
2	(Argentina) DS Schwartzman	4	2

Second round
6	(Italy) P Starace	2	7^{7}	4
Q	(Slovakia) A Martin	6	6^{5}	6
(Italy) S Vagnozzi	2	6	6
WC	(Italy) M Trevisan	6	3	0
(Venezuela) R Rodríguez	3	2
(Slovakia) N Gombos	6	6
(Germany) T Pütz	5	7^{7}	0
WC	(Italy) R Sinicropi	7	6^{5}	6

Quarterfinals
Q	(Slovakia) A Martin	6	4	6
(Italy) S Vagnozzi	4	6	3
(Slovakia) N Gombos	7	6^{2}	6
(Italy) R Sinicropi	5	7^{7}	4

Semifinals
Q	(Slovakia) A Martin	6	0	6
(Slovakia) N Gombos	1	6	3
