= 2006 Croatia Open Umag – Doubles =

Doubles
- 2006 Croatia Open Umag
- 2005 Champions: (Czech Republic) Jiří Novák (Czech Republic) Petr Pála

Final
- Champions: (Czech Republic) Jaroslav Levinský; (Czech Republic) David Škoch
- Runners-up: (Spain) Guillermo García López; (Spain) Albert Portas
- Score: 6–4, 6–4

Details
- Draw: 16
- Seeds: 4

Events
Singles	Doubles
← 2005 ·	Croatia Open	· 2007 →

Jiří Novák and Petr Pála were the defending champions, but chose not to participate.

== Seeds ==
1. (Czech Republic) Lukáš Dlouhý / (Czech Republic) Pavel Vízner (first round)
2. (Czech Republic) Jaroslav Levinský / (Czech Republic) David Škoch (champion)
3. (Argentina) Lucas Arnold Ker / (Germany) Christopher Kas (quarterfinals)
4. (Czech Republic) Jan Hernych / (Czech Republic) Robin Vik (semifinals)

== Draw ==
=== Key ===
- Q = Qualifier
- WC = Wild card
- LL = Lucky loser
- Alt = Alternate
- ITF = ITF entry
- PR = Protected ranking
- SR = Special ranking
- SE = Special exempt
- JE = Junior exempt
- JR = Junior Accelerator Programme entrant
- CO = College Accelerator Programme entrant
- NG = Next Gen Accelerator Program entrant
- w/o = Walkover
- r = Retired
- d = Defaulted

=== Draw ===
First round

Quarterfinals

Semifinals

Final

1
- (Czech Republic) L Dlouhý
- (Czech Republic) P Vízner
5
4

- (Spain) G García López
- (Spain) A Portas
7
6

- (Spain) G García López
- (Spain) A Portas
7
7

- (Serbia) N Djokovic
- (Italy) G Galimberti
5
6
[7]

- (Sweden) J Landsberg
- (Switzerland) J-C Scherrer
5
5

- (Sweden) J Landsberg
- (Switzerland) J-C Scherrer
7
3
[10]

- (Spain) G García López
- (Spain) A Portas
6
6

3
- (Argentina) LA Ker
- (Germany) C Kas
6
1
[10]

- (Serbia) I Bozoljac
- (Czech Republic) J Vaněk
4
4

WC
- (Croatia) Z Krajan
- (Croatia) S Tuksar
3
6
[7]

3
- (Argentina) LA Ker
- (Germany) C Kas
4
6^{6}

- (Serbia) I Bozoljac
- (Czech Republic) J Vaněk
7
6

- (Serbia) I Bozoljac
- (Czech Republic) J Vaněk
6
7^{8}

WC
- (Italy) F Cipolla
- (Italy) S Galvani
5
2

- (Spain) G García López
- (Spain) A Portas
4
4

- (Spain) G Fraile
- (Kazakhstan) E Korolev
4
4

2
- (Czech Republic) J Levinský
- (Czech Republic) D Škoch
6
6

WC
- (Spain) R Carretero
- (Spain) C Moyá
6
6

WC
- (Spain) R Carretero
- (Spain) C Moyá
4
2

- (Argentina) C Berlocq
- (Argentina) M González
6^{5}
4

4
- (Czech Republic) J Hernych
- (Czech Republic) R Vik
6
6

4
- (Czech Republic) J Hernych
- (Czech Republic) R Vik
7^{7}
6

4
- (Czech Republic) J Hernych
- (Czech Republic) R Vik
4
4

- (Spain) R Ramírez Hidalgo
- (Spain) S Ventura
w/o

2
- (Czech Republic) J Levinský
- (Czech Republic) D Škoch
6
6

- (Argentina) JP Guzmán
- (Spain) F Vicente

- (Spain) R Ramírez Hidalgo
- (Spain) S Ventura
6
6^{2}
[7]

- (Italy) A di Mauro
- (Italy) A Motti
6^{5}
5

2
- (Czech Republic) J Levinský
- (Czech Republic) D Škoch
4
7^{7}
[10]

2
- (Czech Republic) J Levinský
- (Czech Republic) D Škoch
7^{7}
7
