= 2009 ATP Studena Croatia Open Umag – Doubles =

Doubles
- 2009 ATP Studena Croatia Open Umag
- 2008 Champion: (Slovakia) Michal Mertiňák; (Czech Republic) Petr Pála

Final
- Champion: (Czech Republic) František Čermák (Slovakia) Michal Mertiňák
- Runner-up: (Sweden) Johan Brunström (Netherlands Antilles) Jean-Julien Rojer
- Score: 6–4, 6–4

Details
- Draw: 16
- Seeds: 4

Events
Singles	Doubles
← 2008 ·	Croatia Open	· 2010 →

Michal Mertiňák and Petr Pála were the defending champions, but Pala chose not to compete.
Mertiňák partnered with František Čermák, and won in the final over Johan Brunström and Jean-Julien Rojer, 6–4, 6–4.

== Seeds ==
1. (Czech Republic) František Čermák / (Slovakia) Michal Mertiňák (champions)
2. (Sweden) Johan Brunström / (Netherlands Antilles) Jean-Julien Rojer (final)
3. (Czech Republic) David Škoch / (Slovakia) Igor Zelenay (first round)
4. (Austria) Julian Knowle / (Austria) Jürgen Melzer (quarterfinals)

== Draw ==
=== Key ===
- Q = Qualifier
- WC = Wild card
- LL = Lucky loser
- Alt = Alternate
- ITF = ITF entry
- PR = Protected ranking
- SR = Special ranking
- SE = Special exempt
- JE = Junior exempt
- JR = Junior Accelerator Programme entrant
- CO = College Accelerator Programme entrant
- NG = Next Gen Accelerator Program entrant
- w/o = Walkover
- r = Retired
- d = Defaulted

=== Draw ===
First round
1	(Czech Republic) F Čermák (Slovakia) M Mertiňák	4	7	[10]
(Ukraine) S Stakhovsky (Croatia) L Zovko	6	5	[5]
(Argentina) B Dabul (Argentina) S Roitman	6	7^{7}
(United Kingdom) J Delgado (United Kingdom) J Murray	1	6^{5}
4	(Austria) J Knowle (Austria) J Melzer	3	6	[10]
(Austria) D Köllerer (Belgium) C Rochus	6	4	[2]
WC	(Croatia) I Dodig (Croatia) I Ljubičić	4	2
(Uruguay) P Cuevas (Argentina) M González	6	6
(Argentina) JI Chela (Spain) R Ramírez Hidalgo	3	3
(Spain) D Gimeno Traver (Spain) M Granollers	6	6
(United States) J Cerretani (United States) T Rettenmaier	7	4	[12]
3	(Czech Republic) D Škoch (Slovakia) I Zelenay	5	6	[10]
WC	(Serbia) M Djokovic (Serbia) N Djokovic	0	5
(Italy) F Fognini (Italy) P Starace	6	7
(Italy) S Bolelli (Italy) A Seppi	3	4
2	(Sweden) J Brunström (Netherlands Antilles) J-J Rojer	6	6

Quarterfinals
1	(Czech Republic) F Čermák (Slovakia) M Mertiňák	6	4	[12]
(Argentina) B Dabul (Argentina) S Roitman	1	6	[10]
4	(Austria) J Knowle (Austria) J Melzer	4	1
(Uruguay) P Cuevas (Argentina) M González	6	6
(Spain) D Gimeno Traver (Spain) M Granollers	6	6
(United States) J Cerretani (United States) T Rettenmaier	4	3
(Italy) F Fognini (Italy) P Starace	6^{5}	6^{6}
2	(Sweden) J Brunström (Netherlands Antilles) J-J Rojer	7^{7}	7^{8}

Semifinals
1	(Czech Republic) F Čermák (Slovakia) M Mertiňák	6	3	[10]
(Uruguay) P Cuevas (Argentina) M González	3	6	[8]
(Spain) D Gimeno Traver (Spain) M Granollers	3	3
2	(Sweden) J Brunström (Netherlands Antilles) J-J Rojer	6	6

Final
1	(Czech Republic) F Čermák (Slovakia) M Mertiňák	6	6
2	(Sweden) J Brunström (Netherlands Antilles) J-J Rojer	4	4
