= 2009 Zenith Tennis Cup =

- Date: June 15 – June 21
- Edition: 4th
- Location: Milan, Italy

Champions

Singles
- (Italy) Alessio di Mauro

Doubles
- (Switzerland) Yves Allegro / (Italy) Daniele Bracciali
← 2008 ·	Zenith Tennis Cup	· 2010 →

The 2009 Zenith Tennis Cup was a professional tennis tournament played on outdoor red clay courts. It was part of the 2009 ATP Challenger Tour. It took place in Milan, Italy between 15 and 21 June 2009.

== Singles entrants ==
=== Seeds ===
Nationality	Player	Ranking*	Seeding
CHL	Nicolás Massú	106	1
USA	Wayne Odesnik	112	2
FRA	Mathieu Montcourt	115	3
ARG	Agustín Calleri	148	4
ITA	Filippo Volandri	149	5
GER	Denis Gremelmayr	153	6
KAZ	Yuri Schukin	175	7
ITA	Alessio di Mauro	183	8

- Rankings are as of May 25, 2009.

=== Other entrants ===
The following players received wildcards into the singles main draw:

- (Italy) Daniele Bracciali
- (Italy) Fabio Colangelo
- (Italy) Gianluca Naso
- (Argentina) Mariano Zabaleta

The following players received entry from the qualifying draw:

- (Italy) Francesco Aldi
- (Argentina) Federico del Bonis
- (Italy) Francesco Piccari
- (Italy) Walter Trusendi

== Champions ==
=== Singles ===
(Italy) Alessio di Mauro def. (France) Vincent Millot, 6–4, 7–6(3)

=== Doubles ===
(Switzerland) Yves Allegro / (Italy) Daniele Bracciali def. (Italy) Manuel Jorquera / (Italy) Francesco Piccari, 6–4, 6–2
