= 2012 Aspria Tennis Cup Trofeo City Life – Singles =

Singles
- 2012 Aspria Tennis Cup Trofeo City Life

Final
- Champion: (Spain) Tommy Robredo
- Runner-up: (Argentina) Martín Alund
- Score: 6–3, 6–0

Events
Singles	Doubles
- Aspria Tennis Cup Trofeo City Life

Albert Ramos was the defending champion but chose to compete in Wimbledon instead.
Tommy Robredo won the final 6–3, 6–0 against Martín Alund.

== Seeds ==
1. (Portugal) Frederico Gil (first round)
2. (Argentina) Federico Delbonis (first round)
3. (Italy) Alessandro Giannessi (first round)
4. (Croatia) Antonio Veić (second round)
5. (Kazakhstan) Andrey Golubev (first round)
6. (Portugal) João Sousa (quarterfinals)
7. (France) Augustin Gensse (first round)
8. (Romania) Victor Hănescu (semifinals)

== Draw ==
Key

- Q = Qualifier
- WC = Wild card
- LL = Lucky loser
- Alt = Alternate
- ITF = ITF entry
- PR = Protected ranking
- SR = Special ranking
- SE = Special exempt
- JE = Junior exempt
- JR = Junior Accelerator Programme entrant
- CO = College Accelerator Programme entrant
- NG = Next Gen Accelerator Program entrant
- w/o = Walkover
- r = Retired
- d = Defaulted

=== Finals ===
Semifinals
WC	(Spain) Tommy Robredo	6	3	7
8/WC	(Romania) Victor Hănescu	2	6	5
(Serbia) Nikola Ćirić	7^{7}	3	6^{5}
(Argentina) Martín Alund	6^{1}	6	7^{7}

Finals
WC	(Spain) Tommy Robredo	6	6
(Argentina) Martín Alund	3	0

=== Top half ===
First round
1/WC	(Portugal) F Gil	1	1
(France) S Robert	6	6
(Italy) S Galvani	2	0
WC	(Spain) T Robredo	6	6
(Serbia) D Lajović	6^{1}	4
(Belgium) Y Mertens	7^{7}	7
(Austria) M Fischer	6	6
7	(France) A Gensse	2	3
4	(Croatia) A Veić	6	2	6
(Russia) K Kravchuk	3	6	4
(Italy) G Naso	7^{7}	3	6
(Slovakia) K Čapkovič	6^{4}	6	3
Q	(Czech Republic) M Michalička	6	6
(Brazil) G Clezar	4	2
(France) G Burquier	5	7^{7}	2
8/WC	(Romania) V Hănescu	7	6^{1}	6

Second round
(France) S Robert	4	3
WC	(Spain) T Robredo	6	6
(Belgium) Y Mertens	6	6
(Austria) M Fischer	2	1
4	(Croatia) A Veić	5	2
(Italy) G Naso	7	6
Q	(Czech Republic) M Michalička	2	3
8/WC	(Romania) V Hănescu	6	6

Quarterfinals
WC	(Spain) T Robredo	6	7^{7}
(Belgium) Y Mertens	3	6^{3}
(Italy) G Naso	3	2
8/WC	(Romania) V Hănescu	6	6

Semifinals
WC	(Spain) T Robredo	6	3	7
8/WC	(Romania) V Hănescu	2	6	5

=== Bottom half ===
First round
5	(Kazakhstan) A Golubev	6	6^{2}	4
(Serbia) N Ćirić	4	7^{7}	6
(Germany) P Gojowczyk	7	1	6^{5}
(France) M Gicquel	5	6	7^{7}
(Kazakhstan) Y Schukin	3	0^{r}
(Bosnia and Herzegovina) D Džumhur	6	2
Q	(Italy) W Trusendi	6	6^{10}	6
3	(Italy) A Giannessi	2	7^{12}	0
6	(Portugal) J Sousa	6	6
WC	(Italy) A Arnaboldi	3	4
(Argentina) F Bagnis	2	7	6
Q	(France) N Devilder	6	5	3
Q	(Monaco) B Balleret	6	3	1
(Argentina) M Alund	4	6	6
(Czech Republic) J Mertl	6	6
2	(Argentina) F Delbonis	3	4

Second round
(Serbia) N Ćirić	6	6
(France) M Gicquel	3	4
(Bosnia and Herzegovina) D Džumhur	7	2	4
Q	(Italy) W Trusendi	5	6	6
6	(Portugal) J Sousa	6	7^{7}
(Argentina) F Bagnis	1	6^{3}
(Argentina) M Alund	6	6
(Czech Republic) J Mertl	3	2

Quarterfinals
(Serbia) N Ćirić	6	6
(Italy) W Trusendi	3	0
6	(Portugal) J Sousa	0	6^{2}
(Argentina) M Alund	6	7^{7}

Semifinals
(Serbia) N Ćirić	7^{7}	3	6^{5}
(Argentina) M Alund	6^{1}	6	7^{7}
