= 2010 ATP Studena Croatia Open Umag – Singles =

Singles
- 2010 ATP Studena Croatia Open Umag

Final
- Champions: (Spain) Juan Carlos Ferrero
- Runners-up: (Italy) Potito Starace
- Score: 6–4, 6–4

Details
- Draw: 28 (4 Q / 3 WC )
- Seeds: 8

Events
| Singles | Doubles |
- Croatia Open

Nikolay Davydenko was the champion in 2009. He tried to defend his title, but lost to Juan Ignacio Chela in the quarterfinal.
Juan Carlos Ferrero won in the final over Potito Starace 6–4, 6–4.

== Seeds ==
The top four seeds receive a bye into the second round.

1. (Russia) Nikolay Davydenko (quarterfinals)
2. (Austria) Jürgen Melzer (quarterfinals)
3. (Croatia) Ivan Ljubičić (quarterfinals)
4. (Spain) Juan Carlos Ferrero (champion)
5. (Germany) Philipp Petzschner (first round)
6. (Ukraine) Alexandr Dolgopolov (quarterfinals)
7. (Ukraine) Sergiy Stakhovsky (first round)
8. (Argentina) Juan Ignacio Chela (semifinals)

== Draw ==
Key

- Q = Qualifier
- WC = Wild card
- LL = Lucky loser
- Alt = Alternate
- ITF = ITF entry
- PR = Protected ranking
- SR = Special ranking
- SE = Special exempt
- JE = Junior exempt
- JR = Junior Accelerator Programme entrant
- CO = College Accelerator Programme entrant
- NG = Next Gen Accelerator Program entrant
- w/o = Walkover
- r = Retired
- d = Defaulted

=== Finals ===
Semifinals
8 | (Argentina) Juan Ignacio Chela | 7^{7} | 3 | 2
(Italy) Potito Starace | 6^{4} | 6 | 6
4 | (Spain) Juan Carlos Ferrero | 6 | 6
(Italy) Andreas Seppi | 4 | 2

Final
(Italy) Potito Starace | 4 | 4
4 | (Spain) Juan Carlos Ferrero | 6 | 6

=== Top half ===
First round
(France) S Robert | 6 | 6
Q | (France) O Patience | 3 | 2
WC | (Croatia) A Veić | 6^{3} | 3
Q | (Italy) S Bolelli | 7^{7} | 6
(Spain) R Ramírez Hidalgo | 4 | 1
8 | (Argentina) JI Chela | 6 | 6
(Spain) I Navarro | 3 | 4
WC | (Croatia) I Dodig | 6 | 6
(Italy) F Fognini | 1 | 4
(Germany) B Phau | 6 | 6
(Italy) P Starace | 6 | 6^{5} | 6
7 | (Ukraine) S Stakhovsky | 3 | 7^{7} | 0

Second round
1 | (Russia) N Davydenko | 6 | 6
(France) S Robert | 1 | 2
Q | (Italy) S Bolelli | 6^{5} | 7^{7} | 1
8 | (Argentina) JI Chela | 7^{7} | 6^{4} | 6
3 | (Croatia) I Ljubičić | 4 | 6 | 6
WC | (Croatia) I Dodig | 6 | 4 | 2
(Germany) B Phau | 4 | 0
(Italy) P Starace | 6 | 6

Quarterfinals
1 | (Russia) N Davydenko | 2 | 1
8 | (Argentina) JI Chela | 6 | 6
3 | (Croatia) I Ljubičić | 4 | 6^{6}
(Italy) P Starace | 6 | 7^{8}

Semifinals
8 | (Argentina) JI Chela | 7^{7} | 3 | 2
(Italy) P Starace | 6^{4} | 6 | 6

=== Bottom half ===
First round
6 | (Ukraine) A Dolgopolov | 6 | 6^{6} | 7^{7}
(Italy) P Lorenzi | 3 | 7^{8} | 6^{3}
WC | (Croatia) F Škugor | 6 | 6
(Italy) F Volandri | 2 | 1
(Uruguay) P Cuevas | 6 | 6
Q | (Italy) S Vagnozzi | 4 | 1
5 | (Germany) P Petzschner | 2 | 3
(Belgium) O Rochus | 6 | 6
(Italy) A Seppi | 6 | 3 | 6
(Argentina) M González | 3 | 6 | 1
(Czech Republic) J Hájek | 6 | 6
Q | (Austria) G Melzer | 4 | 3

Second round
6 | (Ukraine) A Dolgopolov | 7^{7} | 6
WC | (Croatia) F Škugor | 6^{1} | 3
(Uruguay) P Cuevas | 6 | 4 | 4
4 | (Spain) JC Ferrero | 4 | 6 | 6
(Belgium) O Rochus | 4 | 2
(Italy) A Seppi | 6 | 6
(Czech Republic) J Hájek | 1 | 0
2 | (Austria) J Melzer | 6 | 6

Quarterfinals
6 | (Ukraine) A Dolgopolov | 1 | 2
4 | (Spain) JC Ferrero | 6 | 6
(Italy) A Seppi | 6 | 6
2 | (Austria) J Melzer | 1 | 4

Semifinals
4 | (Spain) JC Ferrero | 6 | 6
(Italy) A Seppi | 4 | 2
