= 2008 Croatia Open Umag =

- Date: 14–20 July
- Edition: 19th
- Category: International Series
- Draw: 28S / 16D
- Prize money: €305,000
- Surface: Clay / outdoor
- Location: Umag, Croatia

Champions

Singles
- (Spain) Fernando Verdasco

Doubles
- (Slovakia) Michal Mertiňák / (Czech Republic) Petr Pála
← 2007 ·	Croatia Open	· 2009 →

The 2008 Croatia Open Umag, also known by its sponsored name ATP Studena Croatia Open, was a men's tennis tournament played on outdoor clay courts. It was the 19th edition of the Croatia Open Umag, and was part of the International Series of the 2008 ATP Tour. It took place at the International Tennis Center in Umag, Croatia, from 14 July through 20 July 2008.

The singles field was led by Nottingham runner-up and recent Båstad semifinalist Fernando Verdasco, two-time Nottingham champion Ivo Karlović, and Costa do Sauípe runner-up and five-time Umag winner, defending champion Carlos Moyá. Other seeded players were Gstaad finalist Igor Andreev, Zagreb runner-up Ivan Ljubičić, Guillermo Cañas, Fabio Fognini and Marcos Daniel.

First-seeded Fernando Verdasco won the singles title.

== Finals ==
=== Singles ===
(Spain) Fernando Verdasco defeated (Russia) Igor Andreev, 3–6, 6–4, 7–6^{(7–4)}

- It was Verdasco's 1st title of the year, and his 2nd overall.

=== Doubles ===
(Slovakia) Michal Mertiňák / (Czech Republic) Petr Pála defeated (Argentina) Carlos Berlocq / (Italy) Fabio Fognini, 2–6, 6–3, [10–5]
