= 2011 Aspria Tennis Cup Trofeo City Life =

- Date: June 11 – June 19
- Edition: 6th
- Location: Milan, Italy

Champions

Singles
- (Spain) Albert Ramos

Doubles
- (Spain) Adrián Menéndez / (Italy) Simone Vagnozzi
| ← 2010 · | Aspria Tennis Cup | · 2012 → |

The 2011 Aspria Tennis Cup Trofeo City Life was a professional tennis tournament played on outdoor red clay courts. It was the sixth edition of the tournament and was part of the 2011 ATP Challenger Tour. It took place in Milan, Italy between 11 and 19 June 2011.

== Singles main draw entrants ==
=== Seeds ===
| Nationality | Player | Ranking* | Seeding |
|---|---|---|---|
| ESP | Pere Riba | 65 | 1 |
| ESP | Rubén Ramírez Hidalgo | 98 | 2 |
| ESP | Albert Ramos | 104 | 3 |
| FRA | Éric Prodon | 110 | 4 |
| ARG | Horacio Zeballos | 125 | 5 |
| ARG | Brian Dabul | 149 | 6 |
| FRA | Maxime Teixeira | 166 | 7 |
| ITA | Simone Vagnozzi | 172 | 8 |

- Rankings are as of June 6, 2011.

=== Other entrants ===
The following players received wildcards into the singles main draw:

- (Austria) Thomas Muster
- (Italy) Stefano Travaglia
- (Italy) Matteo Trevisan
- (Italy) Matteo Volante

The following players received entry from the qualifying draw:

- (Italy) Andrea Arnaboldi
- (Monaco) Benjamin Balleret
- (Italy) Antonio Comporto
- (Republic of Ireland) James McGee

== Champions ==
=== Singles ===
(Spain) Albert Ramos def. (Kazakhstan) Evgeny Korolev, 6–4, 3–0, ret.

=== Doubles ===
(Spain) Adrián Menéndez / (Italy) Simone Vagnozzi def. (Italy) Andrea Arnaboldi / (Portugal) Leonardo Tavares, 0–6, 6–3, [10–5]
