= 2013 Aspria Tennis Cup – Trofeo CDI – Doubles =

Trofeo CDI – Doubles
- 2013 Aspria Tennis Cup – Trofeo CDI

Final
- Champions: (Italy) Marco Crugnola (Italy) Daniele Giorgini
- Runners-up: (Australia) Alex Bolt (Chinese Taipei) Peng Hsien-yin
- Score: 4–6, 7–5, [10–8]

Events
Singles	Doubles
- Aspria Tennis Cup

Nicholas Monroe and Simon Stadler were the defending champions, but decided not to participate.

Marco Crugnola and Daniele Giorgini won the final against Alex Bolt and Peng Hsien-yin 4–6, 7–5, [10–8].

== Seeds ==
1. (Croatia) Marin Draganja / (Croatia) Franko Škugor (semifinals)
2. (Australia) Alex Bolt / (Chinese Taipei) Peng Hsien-yin (final)
3. (Kazakhstan) Andrey Golubev / (Kazakhstan) Yuri Schukin (withdrew)
4. (Italy) Alessandro Motti / (Italy) Matteo Volante (quarterfinals)

== Draw ==
Key

- Q = Qualifier
- WC = Wild card
- LL = Lucky loser
- Alt = Alternate
- ITF = ITF entry
- PR = Protected ranking
- SR = Special ranking
- SE = Special exempt
- JE = Junior exempt
- JR = Junior Accelerator Programme entrant
- CO = College Accelerator Programme entrant
- NG = Next Gen Accelerator Program entrant
- w/o = Walkover
- r = Retired
- d = Defaulted

=== Draw ===
First round
1	(Croatia) M Draganja (Croatia) F Škugor	7^{8}	2	[10]
(Croatia) T Androić (Slovakia) A Martin	6^{6}	6	[6]
WC	(Italy) Alessandro Petrone (Italy) Riccardo Sinicropi	6	6
WC	(Italy) Gianmarco Amico (Italy) Alessandro Busca	1	3
4	(Italy) A Motti (Italy) Matteo Volante	4	6	[10]
(Spain) MÁ López Jaén (Spain) Jordi Marsé-Vidri	6	4	[7]
(Moldova) A Ciumac (Ukraine) I Sergeyev	1	2
WC	(Italy) M Crugnola (Italy) D Giorgini	6	6
(Republic of Ireland) J Cluskey (Germany) T Pütz	5	2
(Argentina) G Durán (Argentina) A Molteni	7	6
(Italy) A Arnaboldi (Italy) S Vagnozzi	6	6	[6]
Alt	(Germany) N Langer (France) M Teixeira	2	1
(Japan) T Daniel (Chinese Taipei) H-h Lee	7	1	[8]
(Philippines) R Gonzalez (Australia) Chris Letcher	5	6	[10]
(Ecuador) JC Campozano (Argentina) DS Schwartzman	w/o
2	(Australia) A Bolt (Chinese Taipei) H-y Peng

Quarterfinals
1	(Croatia) M Draganja (Croatia) F Škugor	6	6
(Italy) A Petrone (Italy) R Sinicropi	3	2
4	(Italy) A Motti (Italy) M Volante	4	6	[3]
WC	(Italy) M Crugnola (Italy) D Giorgini	6	4	[10]
(Argentina) G Durán (Argentina) A Molteni	6	6
(Italy) A Arnaboldi (Italy) S Vagnozzi	2	3
(Philippines) R Gonzales (Australia) C Letcher	2	6	[2]
2	(Australia) A Bolt (Chinese Taipei) H-y Peng	6	4	[10]

Semifinals
1	(Croatia) M Draganja (Croatia) F Škugor	3	6	[7]
WC	(Italy) M Crugnola (Italy) D Giorgini	6	3	[10]
(Argentina) G Durán (Argentina) A Molteni	6^{1}	2
2	(Australia) A Bolt (Chinese Taipei) H-y Peng	7^{7}	6

Final
WC	(Italy) M Crugnola (Italy) D Giorgini	4	7	[10]
2	(Australia) A Bolt (Chinese Taipei) H-y Peng	6	5	[8]
