= 2013 Aspria Tennis Cup – Trofeo CDI =

- Date: 17–23 June
- Edition: 8th
- Draw: 32S / 16D
- Prize money: €30,000+H
- Surface: Clay
- Location: Milan, Italy

Champions

Singles
- (Italy) Filippo Volandri

Doubles
- (Italy) Marco Crugnola / (Italy) Daniele Giorgini
- Aspria Tennis Cup

The 2013 Aspria Tennis Cup – Trofeo CDI was a professional tennis tournament played on clay courts. It was the eighth edition of the tournament which was part of the 2013 ATP Challenger Tour. It took place in Milan, Italy between 17 and 23 June 2013.

== Singles main draw entrants ==
=== Seeds ===
| Country | Player | Rank^{1} | Seed |
|---|---|---|---|
| ITA | Filippo Volandri | 114 | 1 |
| ARG | Diego Sebastián Schwartzman | 133 | 2 |
| UKR | Ivan Sergeyev | 174 | 3 |
| KAZ | Andrey Golubev | 177 | 4 |
| TUR | Marsel İlhan | 186 | 5 |
| ITA | Potito Starace | 203 | 6 |
| ECU | Julio César Campozano | 234 | 7 |
| JPN | Taro Daniel | 244 | 8 |

- ^{1} Rankings are as of June 10, 2013.

=== Other entrants ===
The following players received wildcards into the singles main draw:

- (Italy) Alessandro Bega
- (Italy) Gianluigi Quinzi
- (Italy) Riccardo Sinicropi
- (Italy) Matteo Trevisan

The following players received entry from the qualifying draw:

- (United Kingdom) Oliver Golding
- (Argentina) Máximo González
- (Serbia) Filip Krajinović
- (Slovakia) Andrej Martin

The following player received entry as special exempt:

- (Czech Republic) Ivo Minář

== Doubles main draw entrants ==
=== Seeds ===
| Country | Player | Country | Player | Rank^{1} | Seed |
|---|---|---|---|---|---|
| CRO | Marin Draganja | CRO | Franko Škugor | 269 | 1 |
| AUS | Alex Bolt | TPE | Peng Hsien-yin | 352 | 2 |
| KAZ | ~~Andrey Golubev~~ | KAZ | ~~Yuri Schukin~~ | 354 | 3 |
| ITA | Alessandro Motti | ITA | Matteo Volante | 395 | 4 |

- ^{1} Rankings as of June 10, 2013.

=== Other entrants ===
The following pairs received wildcards into the doubles main draw:

- (Italy) Alessandro Petrone / (Italy) Riccardo Sinicropi
- (Italy) Gianmarco Amico / (Italy) Alessandro Busca
- (Italy) Marco Crugnola / (Italy) Daniele Giorgini

The following pair received entry as an alternate:

- (Germany) Nils Langer / (France) Maxime Teixeira

== Champions ==
=== Singles ===
- (Italy) Filippo Volandri def. (Slovakia) Andrej Martin, 6–3, 6–2

=== Doubles ===
- (Italy) Marco Crugnola / (Italy) Daniele Giorgini def. (Australia) Alex Bolt / (Chinese Taipei) Peng Hsien-yin, 4–6, 7–5, [10–8]
