= 2010 Aspria Tennis Cup =

- Date: June 14 – June 20
- Edition: 5th
- Location: Milan, Italy

Champions

Singles
- (Portugal) Frederico Gil

Doubles
- (Italy) Daniele Bracciali / (Spain) Rubén Ramírez Hidalgo
← 2009 ·	Aspria Tennis Cup	· 2011 →

The 2010 Aspria Tennis Cup was a professional tennis tournament played on outdoor red clay courts. It was part of the 2010 ATP Challenger Tour. It took place in Milan, Italy between 14 and 20 June 2010.

== ATP entrants ==
=== Seeds ===
Nationality	Player	Ranking*	Seeding
POR	Frederico Gil	98	1
ITA	Filippo Volandri	103	2
KAZ	Mikhail Kukushkin	131	3
ESP	Rubén Ramírez Hidalgo	132	4
ESP	Alberto Martín	138	5
ESP	Pablo Andújar	139	6
ARG	Federico del Bonis	146	7
ROU	Adrian Ungur	155	8

- Rankings are as of June 7, 2010.

=== Other entrants ===
The following players received wildcards into the singles main draw:

- (Italy) Fabio Colangelo
- (Italy) Enrico Fioravante
- (Italy) Roberto Marcora
- (Italy) Gianluca Naso

The following players received entry from the qualifying draw:

- (Russia) Evgeny Donskoy
- (Switzerland) Yann Marti
- (Mexico) Bruno Rodríguez
- (Germany) Marc Sieber

== Champions ==
=== Singles ===
(Portugal) Frederico Gil def. (Argentina) Máximo González, 6–1, 7–5

=== Doubles ===
(Italy) Daniele Bracciali / (Spain) Rubén Ramírez Hidalgo def. (United States) James Cerretani / (South Africa) Jeff Coetzee, 6–4, 7–5
