= Francesco Piccari =

Italian tennis player

- Full name: Francesco Piccari
- Country (sports): Italy
- Born: 7 September 1979 (age 45)
- Plays: Right-handed
- Prize money: $130,638

Singles
- Career record: 0–2
- Career titles: 0
- Highest ranking: No. 233 (7 July 2008)

Doubles
- Career record: 1–3
- Career titles: 0
- Highest ranking: No. 207 (7 July 2008)

Francesco Piccari (born 7 September 1979) is a former professional tennis player from Italy.

== Biography ==
=== Career ===
Piccari began competing professionally when aged 18 but didn't quite master until he was 19.

He competed in several Grand Slam qualifying draws, including at the 2005 Australian Open, where he lost to future tournament winner Novak Djokovic, who was playing his first match in a Grand Slam.

At the 2008 Croatia Open in Umag, he made the main draw of an ATP Tour tournament for the only time. He featured in both the singles and doubles competitions. In the singles, after winning two qualifying matches, he was beaten in the first round by local player Roko Karanušić. He reached the quarter-finals of the doubles with countryman Gianluca Naso, beating Marcos Daniel and Nicolás Massú, before their tournament was ended in a match decided by a super tie-break, to top seeds David Škoch and Lovro Zovko.

Piccari was a member of the Italian team which competed at the 2009 World Team Cup, picked as a reserve to first choice players Simone Bolelli and Andreas Seppi. When Bolelli became unavailable mid tournament, Piccari came in and played three matches, two doubles rubbers with Seppi and a singles match, which he lost to Janko Tipsarević of Serbia.

=== Personal life ===
In 2017 he married Italian tennis player Karin Knapp.

His younger brother Alessandro was also a professional player, who made it to 391 in the world. The brothers run a tennis academy together in Anzio.

== Challenger titles ==
=== Doubles: (1) ===
No.	Year	Tournament	Surface	Partner	Opponents	Score
1.	2007	Mantova, Italy	Clay	(Russia) Andrey Golubev	(Italy) Leonardo Azzaro (Italy) Marco Crugnola	6–3, 6–2
