= 2019 Croatia Open Umag =

- Date: 15–21 July
- Edition: 30th
- Category: ATP Tour 250
- Draw: 28S/16D
- Prize money: €482,060
- Surface: Clay
- Location: Umag, Croatia

Champions

Singles
- (Serbia) Dušan Lajović

Doubles
- (Netherlands) Robin Haase / (Austria) Philipp Oswald
← 2018 ·	Croatia Open	· 2021 →

The 2019 Croatia Open (also known as the Plava Laguna Croatia Open Umag for sponsorship reasons) was a men's tennis tournament played on outdoor clay courts. It was the 30th edition of the Croatia Open, and part of the 250 Series of the 2019 ATP Tour. It took place at the International Tennis Center in Umag, Croatia, from 15 July through 21 July 2019. Fourth-seeded Dušan Lajović won the singles title.

== Finals ==
=== Singles ===
(Serbia) Dušan Lajović defeated (Hungary) Attila Balázs, 7–5, 7–5

- It was Lajović's only singles title of the year and the 1st of his career.

=== Doubles ===
(Netherlands) Robin Haase / (Austria) Philipp Oswald defeated (Austria) Oliver Marach / (Austria) Jürgen Melzer, 7–5, 6–7^{(2–7)}, [14–12]

== ATP singles main draw entrants ==
=== Seeds ===
Country	Player	Rank^{1}	Seed
ITA	Fabio Fognini	10	1
CRO	Borna Ćorić	14	2
SRB	Laslo Đere	35	3
SRB	Dušan Lajović	36	4
ITA	Marco Cecchinato	41	5
SRB	Filip Krajinović	52	6
SVK	Martin Kližan	56	7
ARG	Leonardo Mayer	59	8

- ^{1} Rankings are as of July 1, 2019

=== Other entrants ===
The following players received wildcards into the singles main draw:

- (Croatia) Viktor Galović
- (Croatia) Nino Serdarušić
- (Italy) Jannik Sinner

The following player received entry using a protected ranking into the main draw:

- (Germany) Cedrik-Marcel Stebe

The following players received entry from the qualifying draw:

- (Hungary) Attila Balázs
- (Italy) Salvatore Caruso
- (Germany) Peter Torebko
- (Argentina) Marco Trungelliti

=== Withdrawals ===
Before the tournament

- (Hungary) Márton Fucsovics → replaced by (Argentina) Facundo Bagnis
- (Tunisia) Malek Jaziri → replaced by (Portugal) Pedro Sousa
- (Argentina) Guido Pella → replaced by (Italy) Stefano Travaglia

=== Retirements ===
- (Italy) Fabio Fognini

== ATP doubles main draw entrants ==
=== Seeds ===
Country	Player	Country	Player	Rank^{1}	Seed
AUT	Oliver Marach	AUT	Jürgen Melzer	64	1
NED	Robin Haase	AUT	Philipp Oswald	102	2
UKR	Denys Molchanov	SVK	Igor Zelenay	131	3
ARG	Leonardo Mayer	ARG	Andrés Molteni	141	4

- Rankings are as of July 1, 2019

=== Other entrants ===
The following pairs received wildcards into the doubles main draw:

- (Bosnia and Herzegovina) Tomislav Brkić / (Croatia) Ante Pavić
- (Croatia) Antonio Šančić / (Croatia) Nino Serdarušić

The following pair received entry as alternates:

- (Germany) Daniel Altmaier / (Germany) Rudolf Molleker

=== Withdrawals ===
During the tournament

- (Italy) Fabio Fognini
