= 2021 Croatia Open Umag – Singles =

Singles
- 2021 Croatia Open Umag

Final
- Champion: (Spain) Carlos Alcaraz
- Runner-up: (France) Richard Gasquet
- Score: 6–2, 6–2

Details
- Draw: 28 (4 Q / 3 WC )
- Seeds: 8

Events
| Singles | Doubles |
- Croatia Open

Carlos Alcaraz defeated Richard Gasquet in the final, 6–2, 6–2 to win the singles tennis title at the 2021 Croatia Open Umag. It was his first ATP Tour title. Alcaraz was the youngest player to win an ATP Tour title since Kei Nishikori at the 2008 Delray Beach International Tennis Championships.

Dušan Lajović was the reigning champion from when the tournament was last held in 2019, but lost to Daniel Altmaier in the quarterfinals.

== Seeds ==
The top four seeds receive a bye into the second round.

1. (Spain) Albert Ramos Viñolas (semifinals)
2. (Serbia) Dušan Lajović (quarterfinals)
3. (Serbia) Filip Krajinović (quarterfinals)
4. (France) Richard Gasquet (final)
5. (Slovenia) Aljaž Bedene (first round)
6. (Spain) Jaume Munar (first round)
7. (Spain) Carlos Alcaraz (champion)
8. (Italy) Gianluca Mager (second round)

== Draw ==
Key

- Q = Qualifier
- WC = Wild card
- LL = Lucky loser
- Alt = Alternate
- ITF = ITF entry
- PR = Protected ranking
- SR = Special ranking
- SE = Special exempt
- JE = Junior exempt
- JR = Junior Accelerator Programme entrant
- CO = College Accelerator Programme entrant
- NG = Next Gen Accelerator Program entrant
- w/o = Walkover
- r = Retired
- d = Defaulted

=== Finals ===
Semifinals
1 | (Spain) Albert Ramos Viñolas | 2 | 6^{3}
7 | (Spain) Carlos Alcaraz | 6 | 7^{7}
4 | (France) Richard Gasquet | 7^{7} | 3 | 6
Q | (Germany) Daniel Altmaier | 6^{2} | 6 | 3

Final
7 | (Spain) Carlos Alcaraz | 6 | 6
4 | (France) Richard Gasquet | 2 | 2

=== Top half ===
First round
Q | (Argentina) A Collarini | 3 | 2
WC | (Croatia) D Ajduković | 6 | 6
(Spain) C Taberner | 6 | 6
WC | (Croatia) N Serdarušić | 2 | 2
(Italy) S Travaglia | 6 | 7^{7}
6 | (Spain) J Munar | 3 | 6^{1}
WC | (Denmark) H Rune | 6 | 3 | 2
(Moldova) R Albot | 1 | 6 | 6
LL | (Argentina) R Olivo | 6 | 2 | 6^{1}
(Slovakia) A Martin | 1 | 6 | 7^{7}
(France) L Pouille | 6 | 2 | 2
7 | (Spain) C Alcaraz | 3 | 6 | 6

Second round
1 | (Spain) A Ramos Viñolas | 7 | 6
WC | (Croatia) D Ajduković | 5 | 4
(Spain) C Taberner | 4 | 3
(Italy) S Travaglia | 6 | 6
3 | (Serbia) F Krajinović | 6 | 6
(Moldova) R Albot | 4 | 2
(Slovakia) A Martin | 3 | 1
7 | (Spain) C Alcaraz | 6 | 6

Quarterfinals
1 | (Spain) A Ramos Viñolas | 6 | 6
(Italy) S Travaglia | 2 | 1
3 | (Serbia) F Krajinović | 6^{3} | 6 | 1
7 | (Spain) C Alcaraz | 7^{7} | 2 | 6

Semifinals
1 | (Spain) A Ramos Viñolas | 2 | 6^{3}
7 | (Spain) C Alcaraz | 6 | 7^{7}

=== Bottom half ===
First round
5 | (Slovenia) A Bedene | 1 | 4
(Italy) M Cecchinato | 6 | 6
(Bosnia and Herzegovina) D Džumhur | 6 | 6
Q | (Slovakia) F Horanský | 4 | 3
Q | (Italy) A Giannessi | 7^{7} | 7
(Czech Republic) J Veselý | 6^{4} | 5
8 | (Italy) G Mager | 0 | 6 | 6
(Spain) P Martínez | 6 | 3 | 3
Q | (Germany) D Altmaier | 5 | 6 | 0
(France) C Moutet | 7 | 1 | 0^{r}
(Spain) B Zapata Miralles | 4 | 6 | 6
(Uruguay) P Cuevas | 6 | 2 | 4

Second round
(Italy) M Cecchinato | 3 | 1
(Bosnia and Herzegovina) D Džumhur | 6 | 6
Q | (Italy) A Giannessi | 6^{4} | 4
4 | (France) R Gasquet | 7^{7} | 6
8 | (Italy) G Mager | 6 | 1 | 5
Q | (Germany) D Altmaier | 4 | 6 | 7
(Spain) B Zapata Miralles | 5 | 4
2 | (Serbia) D Lajović | 7 | 6

Quarterfinals
(Bosnia and Herzegovina) D Džumhur | 3 | 6^{7}
4 | (France) R Gasquet | 6 | 7^{9}
Q | (Germany) D Altmaier | 6 | 6
2 | (Serbia) D Lajović | 2 | 4

Semifinals
4 | (France) R Gasquet | 7^{7} | 3 | 6
Q | (Germany) D Altmaier | 6^{2} | 6 | 3

== Qualifying ==
=== Seeds ===
1. (Germany) Daniel Altmaier (qualified)
2. (Serbia) Nikola Milojević (qualifying competition)
3. (Slovenia) Blaž Rola (first round)
4. (Italy) Alessandro Giannessi (qualified)
5. (Slovakia) Filip Horanský (qualified)
6. (Argentina) Renzo Olivo (qualifying competition, lucky loser)
7. (Italy) Thomas Fabbiano (first round)
8. (Germany) Daniel Masur (first round)

=== Qualifiers ===
1. (Germany) Daniel Altmaier
2. (Slovakia) Filip Horanský
3. (Argentina) Andrea Collarini
4. (Italy) Alessandro Giannessi

=== Lucky loser ===
1. (Argentina) Renzo Olivo

=== Qualifying draw ===
==== First qualifier ====
First round
1 | (Germany) Daniel Altmaier | 2 | 6 | 6
Alt | (Italy) Flavio Cobolli | 6 | 3 | 1
WC | (Croatia) Matija Pecotić | 7 | 6
7 | (Italy) Thomas Fabbiano | 5 | 2

Qualifying competition
1 | (Germany) Daniel Altmaier | 3 | 6 | 6
WC | (Croatia) Matija Pecotić | 6 | 4 | 3

==== Second qualifier ====
First round
2 | (Serbia) Nikola Milojević | 6 | 7
(Czech Republic) Lukáš Rosol | 4 | 5
WC | (Serbia) Hamad Međedović | 4 | 7^{7} | 1
5 | (Slovakia) Filip Horanský | 6 | 6^{2} | 6

Qualifying competition
2 | (Serbia) Nikola Milojević | 2 | 2
5 | (Slovakia) Filip Horanský | 6 | 6

==== Third qualifier ====
First round
3 | (Slovenia) Blaž Rola | 4 | 2
(Ukraine) Vitaliy Sachko | 6 | 6
(Argentina) Andrea Collarini | 6 | 6
8 | (Germany) Daniel Masur | 1 | 1

Qualifying competition
(Ukraine) Vitaliy Sachko | 7^{7} | 2 | 4
(Argentina) Andrea Collarini | 6^{4} | 6 | 6

==== Fourth qualifier ====
First round
4 | (Italy) Alessandro Giannessi | 6 | 7
(Germany) Rudolf Molleker | 3 | 5
Alt | (Bosnia and Herzegovina) Nerman Fatić | 3 | 1
6 | (Argentina) Renzo Olivo | 6 | 6

Qualifying competition
4 | (Italy) Alessandro Giannessi | 7^{7} | 6
6 | (Argentina) Renzo Olivo | 6^{5} | 1
