= Jamie Singer =

British sports lawyer and legal expert, partner at Onside Law LLP

- Born: United Kingdom
- Occupation: Attorney
- Employer: Onside Law LLP
- Title: Partner

Jamie Singer is a British legal expert and sports lawyer based in London, United Kingdom. He qualified for the Commercial department at Clifford Chance and joined IMG in 2000. He was principal legal advisor to IMG's tennis, sponsorship and models divisions until Onside Law’s launch in 2005.

== Career ==
Singer began his legal career at the law firm Clifford Chance, where he gained experience in corporate and commercial law. Singer later moved to a dedicated sports law group within Nicholson Graham & Jones (now part of K&L Gates). There, he further specialised in advising clients within the sports industry. His experience in the sector led to a move to IMG, where Singer served as the principal legal advisor for several European divisions in tennis, sponsorship consultancy, fashion and model management.

In 2005, Singer co-founded Onside Law, a sports-focused law firm in London, with Oliver Hunt and Simon Thorp. Onside Law represented Belgian footballer Eden Hazard during his 2019 transfer from Chelsea to Real Madrid. At £130 million plus add-ons, it was one of the largest transfer deals in world football at the time, only surpassed by deals for Brazilian footballer Neymar and French footballer Kylian Mbappé two seasons prior to Hazard's transfer. Onside Law also represented English footballer Jude Bellingham in his £89 million transfer to Spain from Borussia Dortmund to Real Madrid in the summer of 2023, following his performance in the Bundesliga.

In April 2024, Onside Law represented Jannik Sinner, an Italian tennis player who had tested positive for the banned substance clostebol. In August 2024, Singer argued that Sinner had come into contact with traces of the substance via his physiotherapist during treatment, who had used clostebol to treat a hand injury. Clostebol was found in two separate March 2024 drug checks, with some players calling for a lengthy ban, including Australian tennis player Nick Kyrgios. However, an independent tribunal found the positive test for steroids was unintentional and cleared Sinner of wrongdoing. Following a legal challenge by the World Anti-Doping Agency to the ruling, the case was settled in February 2025 by the Court of Arbitration for Sport (CAS), with Sinner accepting a 3-month suspension.
