= 2019 Croatia Open Umag – Singles =

Singles
- 2019 Croatia Open Umag

Final
- Champion: (Serbia) Dušan Lajović
- Runner-up: (Hungary) Attila Balázs
- Score: 7–5, 7–5

Details
- Draw: 28 (4 Q / 3 WC )
- Seeds: 8

Events
Singles	Doubles
- Croatia Open

Marco Cecchinato was the defending champion, but lost in the first round to Aljaž Bedene.

Dušan Lajović won his first ATP Tour singles title, defeating Attila Balázs in the final, 7–5, 7–5.

== Seeds ==
The top four seeds receive a bye into the second round.

1. (Italy) Fabio Fognini (second round, retired)
2. (Croatia) Borna Ćorić (second round)
3. (Serbia) Laslo Đere (semifinals)
4. (Serbia) Dušan Lajović (champion)
5. (Italy) Marco Cecchinato (first round)
6. (Serbia) Filip Krajinović (second round)
7. (Slovakia) Martin Kližan (first round)
8. (Argentina) Leonardo Mayer (quarterfinals)

== Draw ==
Key

- Q = Qualifier
- WC = Wild card
- LL = Lucky loser
- Alt = Alternate
- ITF = ITF entry
- PR = Protected ranking
- SR = Special ranking
- SE = Special exempt
- JE = Junior exempt
- JR = Junior Accelerator Programme entrant
- CO = College Accelerator Programme entrant
- NG = Next Gen Accelerator Program entrant
- w/o = Walkover
- r = Retired
- d = Defaulted

=== Finals ===
Semifinals
Q	(Hungary) Attila Balázs	6	6
3	(Serbia) Laslo Đere	2	4
4	(Serbia) Dušan Lajović	7	0
Q	(Italy) Salvatore Caruso	5	0^{r}

Final
Q	(Hungary) Attila Balázs	5	5
4	(Serbia) Dušan Lajović	7	7

=== Top half ===
First round
(Italy) S Travaglia	6	6
(Italy) T Fabbiano	3	2
Q	(Hungary) A Balázs	6	6^{5}	7^{7}
WC	(Croatia) V Galović	0	7^{7}	6^{4}
(Japan) T Daniel	5	6^{4}
6	(Serbia) F Krajinović	7	7^{7}
Q	(Germany) P Torebko	7	4	6^{3}
(Italy) P Lorenzi	5	6	7^{7}
PR	(Germany) C-M Stebe	6^{5}	6	6^{2}
(Czech Republic) J Veselý	7^{7}	3	7^{7}
(Spain) P Andújar	1	5
8	(Argentina) L Mayer	6	7

Second round
1	(Italy) F Fognini	1	1^{r}
(Italy) S Travaglia	6	2
Q	(Hungary) A Balázs	6	6^{1}	7^{7}
6	(Serbia) F Krajinović	3	7^{7}	6^{5}
3	(Serbia) L Đere	6	3	6
(Italy) P Lorenzi	3	6	4
(Czech Republic) J Veselý	6	4	4
8	(Argentina) L Mayer	3	6	6

Quarterfinals
(Italy) S Travaglia	6	6^{2}	3
Q	(Hungary) A Balázs	3	7^{7}	6
3	(Serbia) L Đere	6	6^{6}	6
8	(Argentina) L Mayer	4	7^{8}	3

Semifinals
Q	(Hungary) A Balázs	6	6
3	(Serbia) L Đere	2	4

=== Bottom half ===
First round
5	(Italy) M Cecchinato	3	2
(Slovenia) A Bedene	6	6
(Portugal) P Sousa	6	3	4
WC	(Italy) J Sinner	1	6	6
(Russia) A Rublev	6	6
(Netherlands) R Haase	3	2
7	(Slovakia) M Kližan	6	3	5
(Argentina) F Bagnis	4	6	7
Q	(Argentina) M Trungelliti	3	3
WC	(Croatia) N Serdarušić	6	6
(France) C Moutet	5	0
Q	(Italy) S Caruso	7	6

Second round
(Slovenia) A Bedene	7^{7}	6
WC	(Italy) J Sinner	6^{3}	3
(Russia) A Rublev	4	3
4	(Serbia) D Lajović	6	6
(Argentina) F Bagnis	6	6
WC	(Croatia) N Serdarušić	3	3
Q	(Italy) S Caruso	6	3	6
2	(Croatia) B Ćorić	2	6	1

Quarterfinals
(Slovenia) A Bedene	7	3	3
4	(Serbia) D Lajović	5	6	6
(Argentina) F Bagnis	4	0
Q	(Italy) S Caruso	6	6

Semifinals
4	(Serbia) D Lajović	7	0
Q	(Italy) S Caruso	5	0^{r}

== Qualifying ==
=== Seeds ===
1. (Italy) Salvatore Caruso (qualified)
2. (Germany) Rudolf Molleker (qualifying competition)
3. (Italy) Filippo Baldi (first round)
4. (Argentina) Marco Trungelliti (qualified)
5. (Spain) Tommy Robredo (qualifying competition)
6. (Italy) Stefano Napolitano (qualifying competition)
7. (Argentina) Carlos Berlocq (first round)
8. (Hungary) Attila Balázs (qualified)

=== Qualifiers ===
1. (Italy) Salvatore Caruso
2. (Hungary) Attila Balázs
3. (Germany) Peter Torebko
4. (Argentina) Marco Trungelliti

=== Qualifying draw ===
==== First qualifier ====
First round
1	(Italy) Salvatore Caruso	6	6
Alt	(Slovenia) Nik Razboršek	3	2
Alt	(Serbia) Miljan Zekić	2	3
5	(Spain) Tommy Robredo	6	6

Qualifying competition
1	(Italy) Salvatore Caruso	5	6	6
5	(Spain) Tommy Robredo	7	4	3

==== Second qualifier ====
First round
2	(Germany) Rudolf Molleker	6^{3}	7	6
(Italy) Fabrizio Ornago	7^{7}	5	2
WC	(Croatia) Admir Kalender	0	3
8	(Hungary) Attila Balázs	6	6

Qualifying competition
2	(Germany) Rudolf Molleker	2	4
8	(Hungary) Attila Balázs	6	6

==== Third qualifier ====
First round
3	(Italy) Filippo Baldi	6^{4}	3
(Germany) Peter Torebko	7^{7}	6
WC	(Germany) Daniel Altmaier	6	6
7	(Argentina) Carlos Berlocq	2	4

Qualifying competition
(Germany) Peter Torebko	6	7
WC	(Germany) Daniel Altmaier	3	5

==== Fourth qualifier ====
First round
4	(Argentina) Marco Trungelliti	7	7
(Russia) Alexander Zhurbin	5	5
(Spain) Javier Barranco Cosano	6^{1}	6	2
6	(Italy) Stefano Napolitano	7^{7}	3	6

Qualifying competition
4	(Argentina) Marco Trungelliti	6^{4}	6	6
6	(Italy) Stefano Napolitano	7^{7}	2	3
