= 2018 Croatia Open Umag – Doubles =

Doubles
- 2018 Croatia Open Umag
- 2017 Champions: (Argentina) Guillermo Durán (Argentina) Andrés Molteni

Final
- Champions: (Netherlands) Robin Haase (Netherlands) Matwé Middelkoop
- Runners-up: (Czech Republic) Roman Jebavý (Czech Republic) Jiří Veselý
- Score: 6–4, 6–4

Details
- Draw: 16
- Seeds: 4

Events
| Singles | Doubles |
| ← 2017 · | Croatia Open | · 2019 → |

Guillermo Durán and Andrés Molteni were the defending champions, but Durán chose not to participate and Molteni chose to compete in Båstad instead.

Robin Haase and Matwé Middelkoop won the title, defeating Roman Jebavý and Jiří Veselý in the final, 6–4, 6–4.

== Seeds ==
1. (United Kingdom) Dominic Inglot / (Croatia) Franko Škugor (semifinals)
2. (Netherlands) Robin Haase / (Netherlands) Matwé Middelkoop (champions)
3. (Croatia) Antonio Šančić / (Belarus) Andrei Vasilevski (first round)
4. (France) Jonathan Eysseric / (France) Hugo Nys (first round)

== Draw ==
=== Key ===
- Q = Qualifier
- WC = Wild card
- LL = Lucky loser
- Alt = Alternate
- ITF = ITF entry
- PR = Protected ranking
- SR = Special ranking
- SE = Special exempt
- JE = Junior exempt
- JR = Junior Accelerator Programme entrant
- CO = College Accelerator Programme entrant
- NG = Next Gen Accelerator Program entrant
- w/o = Walkover
- r = Retired
- d = Defaulted

=== Draw ===
First round
1 | (United Kingdom) D Inglot (Croatia) F Škugor | 7^{9} | 6
(Netherlands) S Arends (Austria) T-S Weissborn | 6^{7} | 4
(Germany) M Marterer (Chile) H Podlipnik-Castillo | 6 | 6
(Italy) M Cecchinato (Spain) A Ramos Viñolas | 3 | 4
4 | (France) J Eysseric (France) H Nys | 6^{5} | 4
(Ukraine) D Molchanov (Slovakia) I Zelenay | 7^{7} | 6
(Czech Republic) R Jebavý (Czech Republic) J Veselý | 6 | 5 | [10]
WC | (Croatia) I Sabanov (Croatia) M Sabanov | 4 | 7 | [8]
(Italy) P Lorenzi (Argentina) G Pella | 6 | 6
WC | (Croatia) M Draganja (Croatia) T Draganja | 3 | 1
(Mexico) S González (Portugal) J Sousa | 6 | 7
3 | (Croatia) A Šančić (Belarus) A Vasilevski | 4 | 5
(Monaco) R Arneodo (France) B Paire | 6 | 7^{7}
Alt | (Chile) N Jarry (Ecuador) R Quiroz | 2 | 6^{4}
(Serbia) D Lajović (Russia) A Rublev | 4 | 4
2 | (Netherlands) R Haase (Netherlands) M Middelkoop | 6 | 6

Quarterfinals
1 | (United Kingdom) D Inglot (Croatia) F Škugor | 4 | 6 | [10]
(Germany) M Marterer (Chile) H Podlipnik-Castillo | 6 | 2 | [5]
(Ukraine) D Molchanov (Slovakia) I Zelenay | 3 | 5
(Czech Republic) R Jebavý (Czech Republic) J Veselý | 6 | 7
(Italy) P Lorenzi (Argentina) G Pella | 2 | 7 | [7]
(Mexico) S González (Portugal) J Sousa | 6 | 5 | [10]
(Monaco) R Arneodo (France) B Paire | 3 | 5
2 | (Netherlands) R Haase (Netherlands) M Middelkoop | 6 | 7

Semifinals
1 | (United Kingdom) D Inglot (Croatia) F Škugor | 4 | 4
(Czech Republic) R Jebavý (Czech Republic) J Veselý | 6 | 6
(Mexico) S González (Portugal) J Sousa | 4 | 4
2 | (Netherlands) R Haase (Netherlands) M Middelkoop | 6 | 6

Final
(Czech Republic) R Jebavý (Czech Republic) J Veselý | 4 | 4
2 | (Netherlands) R Haase (Netherlands) M Middelkoop | 6 | 6
