= 2018 Croatia Open Umag – Singles =

Singles
- 2018 Croatia Open Umag

Final
- Champion: (Italy) Marco Cecchinato
- Runner-up: (Argentina) Guido Pella
- Score: 6–2, 7–6^{(7–4)}

Details
- Draw: 28 (4 Q / 3 WC )
- Seeds: 8

Events
Singles	Doubles
- Croatia Open

Andrey Rublev was the defending champion, but lost in the quarterfinals to Robin Haase. This was Rublev's first tournament back on tour after missing three months due to a stress fracture in his back.

Marco Cecchinato won the title, defeating Guido Pella in the final, 6–2, 7–6^{(7–4)}.

== Seeds ==
The top four seeds receive a bye into the second round.

1. (United Kingdom) Kyle Edmund (withdrew due to a throat infection)
2. (Bosnia and Herzegovina) Damir Džumhur (second round)
3. (Italy) Marco Cecchinato (champion)
4. (Russia) Andrey Rublev (quarterfinals)
5. (Spain) Albert Ramos Viñolas (second round)
6. (Netherlands) Robin Haase (semifinals)
7. (Portugal) João Sousa (first round)
8. (France) Benoît Paire (first round)
9. (Germany) Maximilian Marterer (second round)

== Draw ==
Key

- Q = Qualifier
- WC = Wild card
- LL = Lucky loser
- Alt = Alternate
- ITF = ITF entry
- PR = Protected ranking
- SR = Special ranking
- SE = Special exempt
- JE = Junior exempt
- JR = Junior Accelerator Programme entrant
- CO = College Accelerator Programme entrant
- NG = Next Gen Accelerator Program entrant
- w/o = Walkover
- r = Retired
- d = Defaulted

=== Finals ===
Semifinals
(Argentina) Guido Pella	6	1	6
6	(Netherlands) Robin Haase	3	6	2
3	(Italy) Marco Cecchinato	6	6
Q	(Argentina) Marco Trungelliti	2	1

Final
(Argentina) Guido Pella	2	6^{4}
3	(Italy) Marco Cecchinato	6	7^{7}

=== Top half ===
First round
(Serbia) D Lajović	7	6
(Georgia (country)) N Basilashvili	5	2
(Argentina) G Pella	1	6	6
(Japan) T Daniel	6	3	3
(Slovenia) A Bedene	7^{7}	4	6
7	(Portugal) J Sousa	6^{5}	6	4
WC	(Canada) F Auger-Aliassime	6	6
LL	(Slovakia) A Martin	4	3
Q	(Slovakia) M Kližan	6	6
(Chile) N Jarry	2	0
Q	(Brazil) R Dutra Silva	6	5	3
6	(Netherlands) R Haase	4	7	6

Second round
5	(Spain) A Ramos Viñolas	3	6	0
(Serbia) D Lajović	6	1	6
(Argentina) G Pella	5	6	6
(Slovenia) A Bedene	7	4	4
4	(Russia) A Rublev	6	6^{4}	6
WC	(Canada) F Auger-Aliassime	4	7^{7}	3
Q	(Slovakia) M Kližan	6	4	3
6	(Netherlands) R Haase	3	6	6

Quarterfinals
(Serbia) D Lajović	6^{3}	5
(Argentina) G Pella	7^{7}	7
4	(Russia) A Rublev	3	6^{6}
6	(Netherlands) R Haase	6	7^{8}

Semifinals
(Argentina) G Pella	6	1	6
6	(Netherlands) R Haase	3	6	2

=== Bottom half ===
First round
9	(Germany) M Marterer	3	7	6
WC	(Croatia) N Serdarušić	6	5	3
(Serbia) L Đere	6	1	6
(Uruguay) P Cuevas	4	6	3
Q	(Italy) S Travaglia	3	6	2
(Czech Republic) J Veselý	6	3	6
8	(France) B Paire	1	3
(Hungary) M Fucsovics	6	6
Q	(Argentina) M Trungelliti	6	6
WC	(Croatia) F Škugor	3	4
(Italy) P Lorenzi	3	4
(Russia) E Donskoy	6	6

Second round
9	(Germany) M Marterer	6^{4}	3
(Serbia) L Đere	7^{7}	6
(Czech Republic) J Veselý	6	5	5
3	(Italy) M Cecchinato	2	7	7
(Hungary) M Fucsovics	7	4	2
Q	(Argentina) M Trungelliti	5	6	6
(Russia) E Donskoy	7^{11}	3	6
2	(Bosnia and Herzegovina) D Džumhur	6^{9}	6	4

Quarterfinals
(Serbia) L Đere	4	1
3	(Italy) M Cecchinato	6	6
Q	(Argentina) M Trungelliti	6	6
(Russia) E Donskoy	1	4

Semifinals
3	(Italy) M Cecchinato	6	6
Q	(Argentina) M Trungelliti	2	1

== Qualifying ==
=== Seeds ===
1. (Slovakia) Martin Kližan (qualified)
2. (Brazil) Rogério Dutra Silva (qualified)
3. (Russia) Alexey Vatutin (qualifying competition, retired)
4. (Italy) Stefano Travaglia (qualified)
5. (Argentina) Facundo Bagnis (first round)
6. (Spain) Enrique López Pérez (first round, retired)
7. (Slovakia) Andrej Martin (qualifying competition, lucky loser)
8. (France) Kenny de Schepper (qualifying competition)

=== Qualifiers ===
1. (Slovakia) Martin Kližan
2. (Brazil) Rogério Dutra Silva
3. (Argentina) Marco Trungelliti
4. (Italy) Stefano Travaglia

=== Lucky loser ===
1. (Slovakia) Andrej Martin

=== Qualifying draw ===
==== First qualifier ====
First round
1	(Slovakia) Martin Kližan	2	7^{7}	6
(Serbia) Danilo Petrović	6	6^{2}	4
(Hungary) Zsombor Piros	2	6^{5}
8	(France) Kenny de Schepper	6	7^{7}

Qualifying competition
1	(Slovakia) Martin Kližan	6	6
8	(France) Kenny de Schepper	4	2

==== Second qualifier ====
First round
2	(Brazil) Rogério Dutra Silva	6	6
WC	(Croatia) Admir Kalender	3	2
(Ecuador) Roberto Quiroz	2	6^{0}
7	(Slovakia) Andrej Martin	6	7^{7}

Qualifying competition
2	(Brazil) Rogério Dutra Silva	6	5	6
7	(Slovakia) Andrej Martin	2	7	2

==== Third qualifier ====
First round
3	(Russia) Alexey Vatutin	6	6
Alt	(Slovenia) Nik Razboršek	2	3
(Argentina) Marco Trungelliti	7^{7}	6
5	(Argentina) Facundo Bagnis	6^{4}	3

Qualifying competition
3	(Russia) Alexey Vatutin	2^{r}
(Argentina) Marco Trungelliti	3

==== Fourth qualifier ====
First round
4	(Italy) Stefano Travaglia	7^{7}	7^{7}
(Italy) Gian Marco Moroni	6^{3}	6^{1}
(Serbia) Peđa Krstin	3
6	(Spain) Enrique López Pérez	1^{r}

Qualifying competition
4	(Italy) Stefano Travaglia	1	6	6
(Serbia) Peđa Krstin	6	3	2
