= 2021 Croatia Open Umag – Doubles =

Doubles
- 2021 Croatia Open Umag
- 2019 Champions: (Netherlands) Robin Haase (Austria) Philipp Oswald

Final
- Champions: (Brazil) Fernando Romboli (Spain) David Vega Hernández
- Runners-up: (Bosnia and Herzegovina) Tomislav Brkić (Serbia) Nikola Ćaćić
- Score: 6–3, 7–5

Details
- Draw: 16
- Seeds: 4

Events
Singles	Doubles
← 2019 ·	Croatia Open	· 2022 →

Robin Haase and Philipp Oswald were the reigning champions from when the tournament was last held in 2019, but chose not to defend their title.

Fernando Romboli and David Vega Hernández won the title, defeating Tomislav Brkić and Nikola Ćaćić in the final, 6–3, 7–5.

== Seeds ==
1. (Bosnia and Herzegovina) Tomislav Brkić / (Serbia) Nikola Ćaćić (final)
2. (Uruguay) Pablo Cuevas / (France) Fabrice Martin (first round)
3. (Brazil) Rafael Matos / (Belarus) Andrei Vasilevski (first round)
4. (Venezuela) Luis David Martínez / (New Zealand) Artem Sitak (first round)

== Draw ==
=== Key ===
- Q = Qualifier
- WC = Wild card
- LL = Lucky loser
- Alt = Alternate
- ITF = ITF entry
- PR = Protected ranking
- SR = Special ranking
- SE = Special exempt
- JE = Junior exempt
- JR = Junior Accelerator Programme entrant
- CO = College Accelerator Programme entrant
- NG = Next Gen Accelerator Program entrant
- w/o = Walkover
- r = Retired
- d = Defaulted

=== Draw ===
First round
1	(Bosnia and Herzegovina) T Brkić (Serbia) N Ćaćić	6	3	[10]
WC	(Croatia) D Ajduković (Croatia) F Ninčević	4	6	[8]
(Czech Republic) R Jebavý (Czech Republic) J Veselý	7	6
(Spain) C Taberner (Spain) B Zapata Miralles	5	3
4	(Venezuela) LD Martinez (New Zealand) A Sitak	6	6^{1}	[6]
(Croatia) I Sabanov (Croatia) M Sabanov	3	7^{7}	[10]
(Italy) S Caruso (Italy) G Mager	7^{8}	2	[6]
(Bosnia and Herzegovina) D Džumhur (Croatia) A Šančić	6^{6}	6	[10]
(Moldova) R Albot (Spain) P Martínez	6	7^{7}
(Germany) A Begemann (Slovakia) I Zelenay	4	6^{5}
(Italy) M Cecchinato (Italy) S Travaglia	7	6
3	(Brazil) R Matos (Belarus) A Vasilevski	5	4
PR	(Spain) M López (Spain) J Munar	5	6	[5]
(Brazil) F Romboli (Spain) D Vega Hernández	7	4	[10]
WC	(Croatia) A Kalender (Croatia) M Poljičak	6	6
2	(Uruguay) P Cuevas (France) F Martin	3	4

Quarterfinals
1	(Bosnia and Herzegovina) T Brkić (Serbia) N Ćaćić	6	6
(Czech Republic) R Jebavý (Czech Republic) J Veselý	2	2
(Croatia) I Sabanov (Croatia) M Sabanov	7	6
(Bosnia and Herzegovina) D Džumhur (Croatia) A Šančić	5	0
(Moldova) R Albot (Spain) P Martínez	6	6
(Italy) M Cecchinato (Italy) S Travaglia	4	1
(Brazil) F Romboli (Spain) D Vega Hernández	3	7	[16]
WC	(Croatia) A Kalender (Croatia) M Poljičak	6	5	[14]

Semifinals
1	(Bosnia and Herzegovina) T Brkić (Serbia) N Ćaćić	6	6
(Croatia) I Sabanov (Croatia) M Sabanov	1	2
(Moldova) R Albot (Spain) P Martínez	6	6^{8}	[7]
(Brazil) F Romboli (Spain) D Vega Hernández	4	7^{10}	[10]

Final
1	(Bosnia and Herzegovina) T Brkić (Serbia) N Ćaćić	3	5
(Brazil) F Romboli (Spain) D Vega Hernández	6	7
