= 2019 Croatia Open Umag – Doubles =

Doubles
- 2019 Croatia Open Umag
- 2018 Champions: (Netherlands) Robin Haase (Netherlands) Matwé Middelkoop

Final
- Champions: (Netherlands) Robin Haase (Austria) Philipp Oswald
- Runners-up: (Austria) Oliver Marach (Austria) Jürgen Melzer
- Score: 7–5, 6–7^{(2–7)}, [14–12]

Details
- Draw: 16
- Seeds: 4

Events
Singles	Doubles
← 2018 ·	Croatia Open	· 2021 →

Robin Haase and Matwé Middelkoop were the defending champions, but Middelkoop chose to compete in Båstad instead.

Haase played alongside Philipp Oswald and successfully defended the title, defeating Oliver Marach and Jürgen Melzer in the final, 7–5, 6–7^{(2–7)}, [14–12].

== Seeds ==
1. (Austria) Oliver Marach / (Austria) Jürgen Melzer (final)
2. (Netherlands) Robin Haase / (Austria) Philipp Oswald (champions)
3. (Ukraine) Denys Molchanov / (Slovakia) Igor Zelenay (semifinals)
4. (Argentina) Leonardo Mayer / (Argentina) Andrés Molteni (semifinals)

== Draw ==
=== Key ===
- Q = Qualifier
- WC = Wild card
- LL = Lucky loser
- Alt = Alternate
- ITF = ITF entry
- PR = Protected ranking
- SR = Special ranking
- SE = Special exempt
- JE = Junior exempt
- JR = Junior Accelerator Programme entrant
- CO = College Accelerator Programme entrant
- NG = Next Gen Accelerator Program entrant
- w/o = Walkover
- r = Retired
- d = Defaulted

=== Draw ===
First round
1	(Austria) O Marach (Austria) J Melzer	6	7^{7}
(Portugal) P Sousa (Italy) S Travaglia	2	6^{2}
(Uruguay) A Behar (United States) N Lammons	7	2	[9]
(Serbia) N Čačić (Serbia) D Lajović	5	6	[11]
4	(Argentina) L Mayer (Argentina) A Molteni	6	6
(Brazil) F Neis (Germany) C-M Stebe	4	1
(Chile) H Podlipnik Castillo (Austria) T-S Weissborn	2	2
WC	(Bosnia and Herzegovina) T Brkić (Croatia) A Pavić	6	6
Alt	(Germany) D Altmaier (Germany) R Molleker	5	3
WC	(Croatia) A Šančić (Croatia) N Serdarušić	7	6
(Spain) P Andújar (Spain) G Granollers	2	2
3	(Ukraine) D Molchanov (Slovakia) I Zelenay	6	6
(Italy) T Fabbiano (Italy) P Lorenzi	7^{7}	1	[8]
(Italy) S Bolelli (Italy) F Fognini	6^{5}	6	[10]
(Russia) A Rublev (Belarus) A Vasilevski	6	5	[14]
2	(Netherlands) R Haase (Austria) P Oswald	4	7	[16]

Quarterfinals
1	(Austria) O Marach (Austria) J Melzer	6	6
(Serbia) N Čačić (Serbia) D Lajović	2	3
4	(Argentina) L Mayer (Argentina) A Molteni	7	7
WC	(Bosnia and Herzegovina) T Brkić (Croatia) A Pavić	5	5
WC	(Croatia) A Šančić (Croatia) N Serdarušić	3	6	[2]
3	(Ukraine) D Molchanov (Slovakia) I Zelenay	6	4	[10]
(Italy) S Bolelli (Italy) F Fognini
2	(Netherlands) R Haase (Austria) P Oswald	w/o

Semifinals
1	(Austria) O Marach (Austria) J Melzer	7^{7}	7
4	(Argentina) L Mayer (Argentina) A Molteni	6^{5}	5
3	(Ukraine) D Molchanov (Slovakia) I Zelenay	5	6	[8]
2	(Netherlands) R Haase (Austria) P Oswald	7	1	[10]

Final
1	(Austria) O Marach (Austria) J Melzer	5	7^{7}	[12]
2	(Netherlands) R Haase (Austria) P Oswald	7	6^{2}	[14]
