= Jannik Sinner =

Italian tennis player (born 2001)

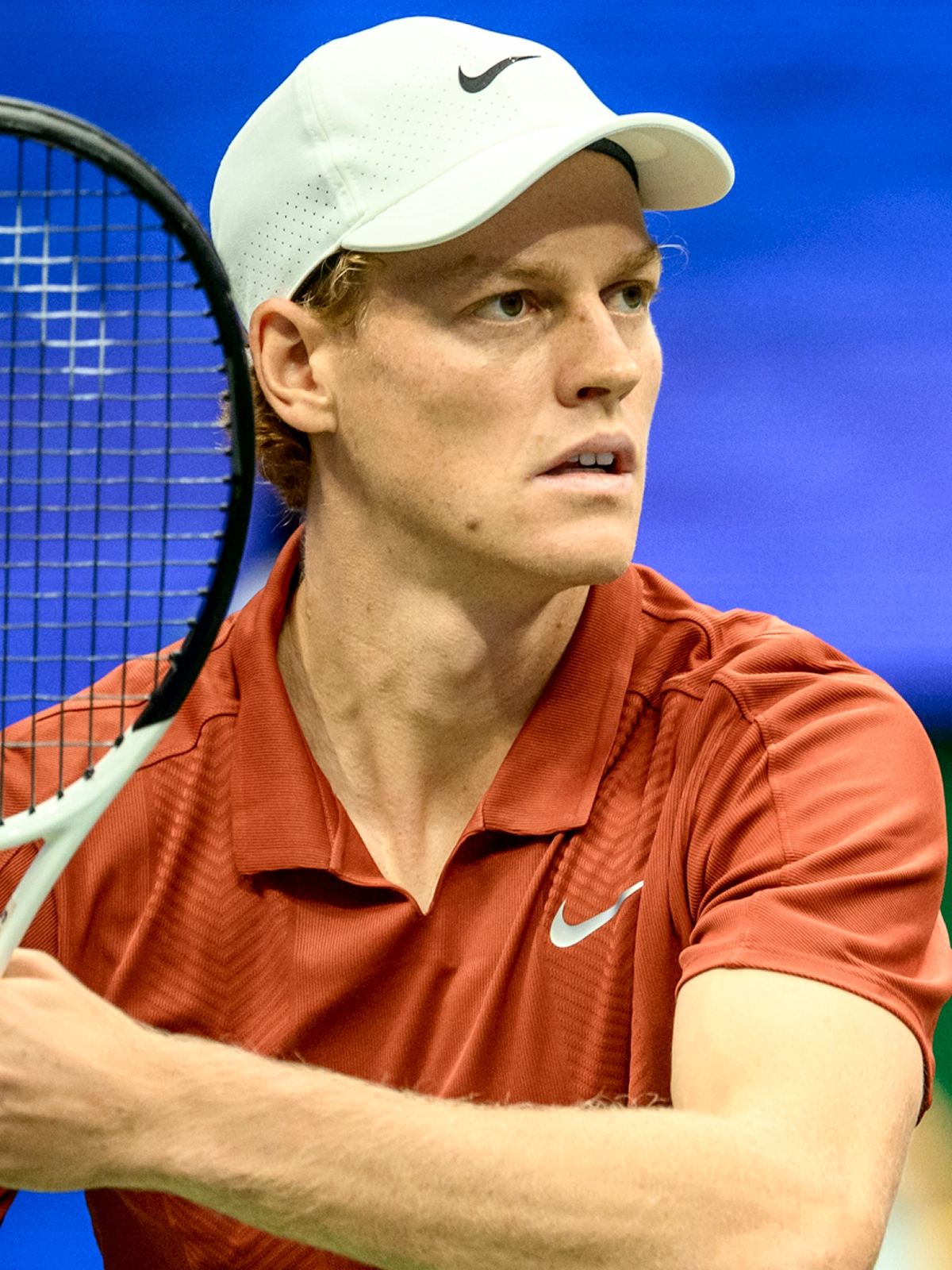
- Sinner at the 2025 US Open
- Country (sports): Italy
- Residence: Monte Carlo, Monaco
- Born: 16 August 2001 (age 25) Innichen, Italy
- Height: 1.91 m (6 ft 3 in)
- Turned pro: 2018
- Plays: Right-handed (two-handed backhand)
- Coach: Simone Vagnozzi; Darren Cahill (2022–2026); Magnus Norman (2026–present)
- Prize money: US $70,675,661: 5th all-time in earnings
- Official website: janniksinner.com

Singles
- Career record: 365–89 (80.4%)
- Career titles: 30
- Highest ranking: No. 1 (10 June 2024)
- Current ranking: No. 2 (2 November 2026)

Grand Slam singles results
- Australian Open: W (2024, 2025)
- French Open: F (2025)
- Wimbledon: W (2025, 2026)
- US Open: W (2024)

Other tournaments
- Tour Finals: W (2024, 2025)

Doubles
- Career record: 27–26
- Career titles: 1
- Highest ranking: No. 124 (27 September 2021)

Team competitions
- Davis Cup: W (2023, 2024)

- Last updated on: 2 November 2026.

Jannik Sinner (Note: Austrian German pronunciation: [ˈjanɪk ˈsɪnɐ], Italian pronunciation: [ˈjannik ˈsinner].) (born 16 August 2001) is an Italian professional tennis player. He has been ranked world No. 1 in men's singles by the Association of Tennis Professionals (ATP) for 95 weeks, and finished as the year-end No. 1 in 2024. Sinner has won 30 ATP Tour–level singles titles, including five majors, ten Masters and two ATP Finals titles. He led Italy to back-to-back Davis Cup crowns in 2023 and 2024.

Sinner made his professional debut aged 16 and became one of the few players to win multiple ATP Challenger Tour titles at age 17. In 2019, he won the Next Gen ATP Finals and the ATP Newcomer of the Year award, and two years later became the first player born in the 2000s to enter the top 10 in rankings. Sinner won his first ATP Masters 1000 title at the 2023 Canadian Open and finished the season as runner-up at the ATP Finals. At the 2024 Australian Open, Sinner defeated world No. 1 Novak Djokovic followed by Daniil Medvedev in a five-set final to win his first major title. He went on to win both the US Open and the ATP Finals to finish the year at the top of the ATP rankings, becoming the first Italian player to reach world No. 1.

In 2025, Sinner reached the finals of all four majors, winning at the Australian Open and Wimbledon, and losing to Carlos Alcaraz in a five-set epic at the French Open as well as at the US Open. In 2026, Sinner defended his Wimbledon title and won a record five consecutive ATP Masters 1000 titles, becoming the second and youngest player to complete the career Golden Masters since the series started in 1990 (at 24 years, 9 months and 1 day old).

== Early life and background ==
Jannik Sinner was born 16 August 2001 to Hanspeter Sinner and Siglinde Rauchegger in Innichen, in the Northern Italian province of South Tyrol. His native language is German. He grew up in the town of Sexten in the Dolomites, the family hometown, where his father worked as a chef and his mother as a waitress at a ski lodge. He has an older adopted brother, Mark, who was born in Russia in 1998. Sinner began skiing at age three and competed in his first ski races at the age of eight. He began playing tennis at age seven. He was one of Italy's top junior skiers from seven to 12 years old, winning a national championship in giant slalom at age seven in 2008 and becoming a national runner-up at age 11 in 2012.

While training in skiing, Sinner gave up tennis for a year at age seven before his father pushed him to return to the sport. When he resumed playing, Heribert Mayr was his first regular coach. Sinner's grandfather drove him to Tennis San Giorgio early in the morning, where Sinner had to take individual lessons with Mayr as no child his age there was at his level and he was much faster than the older children. Nonetheless, tennis was still only his third priority, behind skiing and football. In the mornings he competed in ski races and in the afternoons he played football matches for AFC Sexten (Youth).

At age 13, Sinner gave up skiing and football in favour of tennis due to his physique; he was tall, thin, and weighed only 35 kg (77 lb). He also preferred competing in an individual sport directly against an opponent and having more control over the outcome. He moved to Bordighera on the Italian Riviera, Liguria, on his own to train at the Piatti Tennis Center under Riccardo Piatti and Massimo Sartori, a decision his parents supported. There, Sinner lived with the family of Luka Cvjetković, one of his coaches, and later moved out to share an apartment with two boys. Before he began tennis training with Piatti full time, he had been playing only twice a week. He obtained his high school certificate at the Walther Institute, a private business and technical school in Bolzano.

== Junior career ==
Sinner began playing tennis on the ITF Junior Circuit. In spite of having limited success, he moved mainly to the professional tour following the end of 2017. He never played the main draw of any high-level Grade 1 events in singles, and did not play any of the junior Grand Slam tournaments. The only higher-level Grade A tournament he entered was the Trofeo Bonfiglio.

Sinner followed up an opening round loss at Italy's Grade A tournament in 2017 with a quarterfinal in 2018, the only junior event he played that year. Because he entered so few high-level tournaments, Sinner's career-high junior ranking was a relatively low No. 133.

== Professional career ==
=== 2018: Pro debut ===
Sinner began playing on the ITF Men's Circuit in early 2018. With his low ranking he could initially be directly accepted into only ITF Futures events. Nonetheless, he began receiving wild cards for ATP Challenger Tour events, the second-tier tour run by the Association of Tennis Professionals (ATP), in the second half of the year. His only ITF title of the year was in doubles, and he finished the season ranked No. 551.

=== 2019: NextGen champion, top 100 ===
Sinner won his first ATP Challenger title in Bergamo in February 2019 at the age of 17 years and 6 months, despite entering the tournament with no match wins at the Challenger level. He became the first person born in 2001 to reach a Challenger final, and the youngest Italian to win a Challenger title in history. With the title, he rose over 200 spots in ATP rankings up to No. 324.

After his first two ITF Futures titles, Sinner entered his first ATP tournament at the Hungarian Open as a lucky loser, where he notched his first tour-level win over home wild card Máté Valkusz. The next week, he reached his second ATP Challenger final in Ostrava, finishing runner-up to Kamil Majchrzak.

During the second half of the season Sinner played more often on the ATP Tour than the Challenger Tour. His first ATP Masters 1000 victory came at the Italian Open against Steve Johnson, and he broke into the top 200 with his next ATP win at the Croatia Open Umag in July. The next month, he won a second ATP Challenger title in Lexington to become one of just eleven 17-year-olds to have won multiple Challenger titles. After losing in qualifying at Wimbledon, Sinner qualified for his first Grand Slam tournament main draw at the US Open. He lost his debut match to No. 24 Stan Wawrinka.

Sinner had a strong finish to the season. As a wild card at the European Open, he became the youngest player in five years to reach an ATP semifinal. Along the way, he knocked off top seed and world No. 13 Gaël Monfils for his first career top 50 victory. This performance helped him break into the top 100 for the first time one week later. At the end of the season, Sinner qualified for the 2019 Next Gen ATP Finals as the Italian wild card and the lowest seed. He won in his round robin group with victories over Frances Tiafoe and Mikael Ymer, losing only to Ugo Humbert.

After defeating Miomir Kecmanović in the semifinals, Sinner upset top seed and world No. 18 Alex de Minaur in straight sets to win the title. He played one last event in Italy the following week, winning a third Challenger title in Ortisei. Sinner finished the year at world No. 78, becoming the youngest player in the year-end top 80 since Rafael Nadal in 2003. He was also named ATP Newcomer of the Year. and received the Gazzetta Sport Award for Best Performance of the Year for his win over de Minaur in the Next Gen ATP Finals.

=== 2020: First ATP title, top 50 ===
Early in the year Sinner made the second round of the 2020 Australian Open, recording his first major match win over home wild card Max Purcell before losing to Márton Fucsovics. As a wild card at the Rotterdam Open, he earned his first top 10 victory against world No. 10 David Goffin.

Following the ATP Tour shutdown due to the COVID-19 pandemic, Sinner had a successful restart to the season. Although he lost his opening round match to Karen Khachanov at the US Open, he fared better in Europe. He reached the third round at the Italian Open, highlighted by a victory over world No. 6 Stefanos Tsitsipas. He then progressed to become the youngest quarterfinalist at the French Open since Novak Djokovic in 2006, and the first to make the quarterfinals on debut since Rafael Nadal in 2005. During the tournament, he defeated Goffin again as well as US Open runner-up and world No. 7 Alexander Zverev before losing to Nadal.

After a semifinal at the Cologne Championship, where he lost to Zverev, Sinner closed out the season by winning the Sofia Open for his first ATP title. During the event, he defeated Next Gen rival Alex de Minaur and then Vasek Pospisil in the final. He became the youngest Italian tour-level champion in the Open Era and the youngest player overall to win an ATP title since Kei Nishikori in 2008.

Sinner finished the year ranked world No. 37.

=== 2021: Four titles, first Masters final, top 10 ===
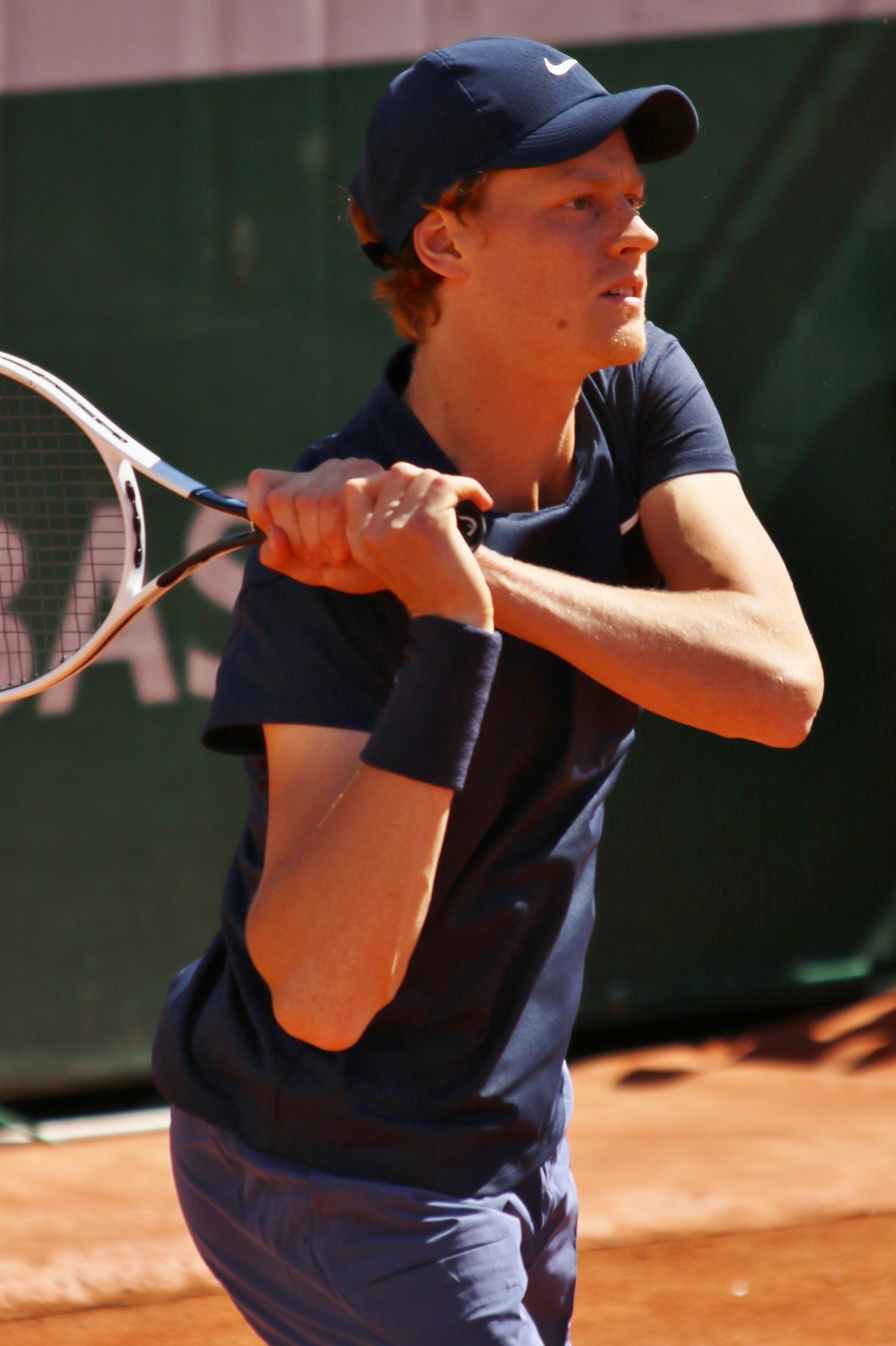
Sinner at the 2021 French Open

Sinner carried over his success from late 2020 into the start of the 2021 season. He won his second career ATP title at the Great Ocean Road Open, and notably defeated No. 20 Karen Khachanov in the semifinals after saving a match point. He became the youngest to win back-to-back ATP titles since Rafael Nadal in 2005. His ten-match winning streak came to an end in the first round of the 2021 Australian Open, where he lost a tight five-set match to world No. 12 Denis Shapovalov.

Sinner's next big result was at the Miami Open, where he reached his first ATP Masters 1000 final. During the tournament, he defeated Khachanov again and later world No. 12 Roberto Bautista Agut in the semifinal. He finished runner-up to Hubert Hurkacz.

Then at the French Open, his campaign was stopped short for the second year running by Rafael Nadal, who this time defeated Sinner in straight sets in the fourth round. In his main draw debut at Wimbledon, he lost in the first round to Márton Fucsovics.

Partnering Reilly Opelka he won his first doubles title at the 2021 Atlanta Open, defeating Steve Johnson and Jordan Thompson. At the same tournament in singles he fell in the second round to Christopher O'Connell.

At the 2021 Citi Open in Washington, D.C., Sinner went into the tournament as the fifth seed and made it to the finals and beat several young players along the way such as Emil Ruusuvuori, Sebastian Korda, and Jenson Brooksby. He beat Mackenzie McDonald in the final to win his third title and first ATP 500 title. Sinner was the first Italian finalist and champion in Washington's tournament history as well as the youngest ATP 500 and first teen champion since the category was created in 2009. As a result, he entered the top 15 in the ATP rankings on 9 August 2021.

At the US Open, he defeated Gaël Monfils in the third round to reach the second week of a Major for the second time in the season. Sinner's tournament ended when he lost to Alexander Zverev in the 4th round in straight sets.

Sinner successfully defended his title at the Sofia Open as the top seed, defeating again second seed Gaël Monfils in the final. Sinner made his sixth career final at the 2021 European Open without dropping a set en route. He defeated Lorenzo Musetti, Arthur Rinderknech and Lloyd Harris to reach the final. He bested Diego Schwartzman in the final to take his fifth career title. He became the youngest man to win five ATP titles since 19-year-old Novak Djokovic.

On 1 November, Sinner became the first male player born in the 2000s to break into the top-10 after a semifinal appearance at the Vienna Open. At the Paris Masters, Sinner received a bye in the first round but was defeated by Carlos Alcaraz. Because of this, Sinner was unable to directly qualify for the season-ending Nitto ATP Finals.

At the ATP Finals in Turin, Sinner was present as the first alternate. Sinner entered the tournament after countryman Matteo Berrettini was forced to withdraw with an abdominal injury after his first match with Alexander Zverev. He defeated Hubert Hurkacz and became the youngest player to win an ATP Finals match on debut since Lleyton Hewitt in Lisbon in 2000 and the first alternate to win a match since Janko Tipsarević in London in 2011. Sinner played Daniil Medvedev next in the round robin stage, holding a match point before being defeated in 3 sets. As a result, he re-entered the top-10 in the rankings and finished the year at world No. 10 on 22 November 2021.

In the Davis Cup Finals, Sinner defeated John Isner becoming only the second player (after Thiemo de Bakker) ever to bagel (6–0 set win) Isner.

=== 2022: Three major quarterfinals ===
At the Australian Open Sinner reached the quarterfinals of a major for the second time in his career, becoming the fifth Italian man to reach that stage in Melbourne. He then lost to fourth seed Stefanos Tsitsipas in straight sets.

At the Miami Open, he saved three match points in the opening round against Emil Ruusuvuori and five match points against Pablo Carreño Busta to advance to the round of 16. He then defeated Nick Kyrgios but retired against Francisco Cerúndolo in the quarterfinals. In the Monte Carlo Masters, he again reached the quarterfinals after defeating fifth seed Andrey Rublev, before losing to second seed Alexander Zverev in a three-set and over three hour-long match. He again saved three match points in the opener at the Madrid Open against Tommy Paul to move to the second round. Next, he defeated Alex de Minaur for his 100th career win; he hit this milestone after 147 matches (100–47) on Tour, which was a faster rate than everyone in the Top 10 besides Rafael Nadal (100–37) and Novak Djokovic (100–43). He was defeated in the third round by Félix Auger-Aliassime.

At the French Open, Sinner retired in the fourth round against Andrey Rublev after sustaining a knee injury.

At the Eastbourne International, Sinner suffered his first opening round loss of the year after losing to Tommy Paul in three sets. At the 2022 Wimbledon Championships, he recorded his first win at this Major over Stan Wawrinka. He then beat Mikael Ymer, John Isner, and Carlos Alcaraz to reach his third career major quarterfinal. He lost to top seed and eventual champion Novak Djokovic in five sets in the quarterfinals, after being two sets to love up.

At the Croatia Open, Sinner defeated Carlos Alcaraz in the final to win his first clay court title. In Montreal, he lost to eventual champion Pablo Carreño Busta in the third round. Sinner's loss guaranteed a maiden ATP Masters 1000 finalist from his half of the draw. At the Cincinnati Open, he lost in the third round to Félix Auger-Aliassime after being up a set, a break, and two match points.

Seeded 11th at the US Open, he reached the fourth round after defeating Brandon Nakashima in four sets. Next, he defeated Ilya Ivashka in a five set match lasting close to four hours to reach the quarterfinals for the first time at this Major. He became the youngest player to reach the quarterfinals of all four major tournaments since Novak Djokovic in 2007–08. He lost to Carlos Alcaraz in a five-set match that lasted 5 hours and 15 minutes; the match set the record as the latest finish (at 2:50 am EST) and second longest match in US Open history. Sinner held a match point while serving up 5–4 in the 4th set, but ended up losing the set 5–7.

In September, during the Davis Cup Finals after Matteo Berrettini won his singles match against Argentina, Sinner won the second match (best of three matches) and thus secured a place for Italy's Davis Cup team at the Final 8 of the Davis Cup Finals. Following close to a month break due to an injury sustained in the semifinal at the 2022 Sofia Open he returned to the 2022 Erste Bank Open in Vienna and reached also the quarterfinals losing to top seed and eventual champion Daniil Medvedev. In his next tournament, the Paris Masters, he lost in the first round to qualifier Marc-Andrea Huesler.

Sinner finished the year ranked 15th in the world, one place ahead of countryman Matteo Berrettini.

=== 2023: Canadian Open and Davis Cup champion ===
Sinner started his season at the 2023 Adelaide international 1, where he lost in the quarterfinals to eventual runner-up Sebastian Korda. At the 2023 Australian Open, Sinner lost in the 4th round to eventual runner-up Stefanos Tsitsipas in 5 sets.

Sinner then won his seventh title at the Open Sud de France in Montpellier, becoming the first player to win a tour-level title in the season without having dropped a single set and the first since countryman Lorenzo Musetti won the title in Naples in October 2022. At the ABN AMRO Open he defeated top seed and world No. 3 Stefanos Tsitsipas taking his revenge for the Australian Open loss, for his biggest win ever. Next in the quarterfinals, he defeated Stan Wawrinka in straight sets. In the semifinals, he defeated home favorite Tallon Griekspoor to reach the final, which he lost to sixth seed Daniil Medvedev.

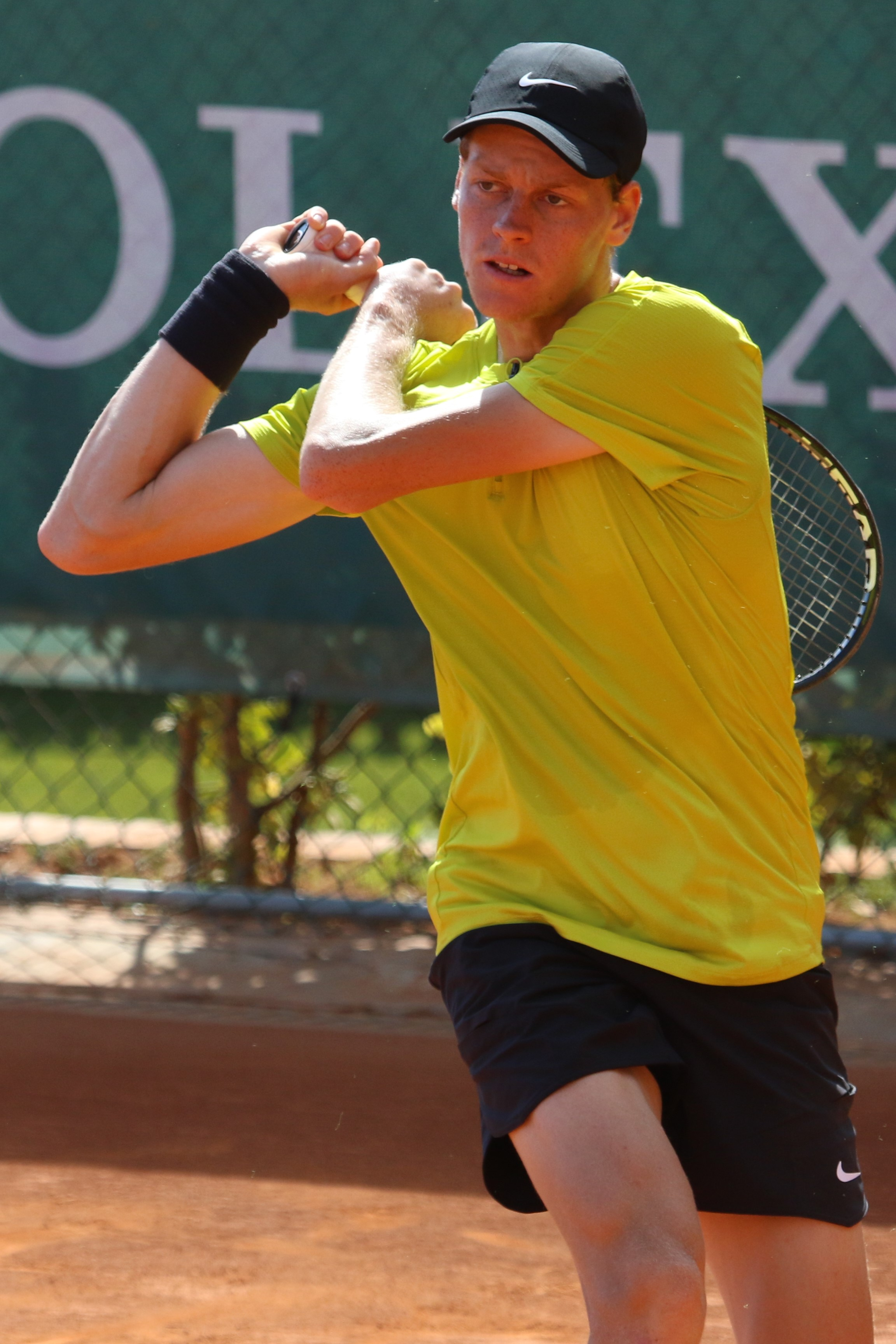
Sinner at the 2023 Monte-Carlo Masters

In March, he played in Indian Wells where he defeated Richard Gasquet, Adrian Mannarino, and Stan Wawrinka all in straight sets to advance to the quarterfinals where he faced defending champion Taylor Fritz and won in a three-set match. In the following round in the semifinals, he lost in straight sets to career rival and top seed Carlos Alcaraz who returned to world No. 1 following the tournament. In Miami, he reached the quarterfinals of this tournament for a third straight year after defeating Grigor Dimitrov and Andrey Rublev, thus returning to the top 10 in the rankings at world No. 9. He then defeated Emil Ruusuvuori to reach back-to-back semifinals, where he again faced the defending champion Carlos Alcaraz, this time winning to reach his second Miami final in three years, putting an end to Alcaraz's hopes for a Sunshine Double and preventing him from returning to the No. 1 spot. He lost to fourth seed Daniil Medvedev in straight sets in the final, extending his losing streak versus the Russian to 0–6.

In Monte Carlo he reached a third consecutive ATP 1000 semifinal defeating compatriot and 16th seed Lorenzo Musetti. At the French Open, Sinner was upset in the second round by Daniel Altmaier in a five-set match despite serving for the match in the fourth set and having two match points. At five hours and 26 minutes, it was the longest match of Sinner's career up until this point and the fifth-longest in the tournament history as well as the second longest of the season after Andy Murray against Thanasi Kokkinakis at the Australian Open.

He reached back to back quarterfinals in Wimbledon after defeating Juan Manuel Cerundolo, Diego Schwartzman, Quentin Halys and Daniel Elahi Galán. He then reached his first Major semifinal after defeating Roman Safiullin, before losing to Novak Djokovic in straight sets. In August, he won his maiden ATP Masters 1000 title at the Canadian Open, defeating compatriot Matteo Berrettini, Andy Murray by walkover, Gaël Monfils, and Tommy Paul en route to the final, where he beat Alex de Minaur in straight sets for his eighth ATP title.

At the China Open, he defeated world No. 2 Carlos Alcaraz, his fourth tour-level win against the Spaniard, to reach his fifth final of the season, where he defeated world No. 3 Daniil Medvedev for the first time at the seventh time of asking. As a result, he climbed to a career-high world No. 4 to become the second Italian in the history of the ATP rankings to reach the Top 5, equaling Adriano Panatta. At the Shanghai Masters he lost in the round of 16 to Ben Shelton. He recorded his 55th win over Andrey Rublev to reach his fourth ATP 500 career final in Vienna and became the first Italian man with the most wins for a season in the Open Era, surpassing Corrado Barazzutti's 54 mark in 1978. He won the final defeating again top seed Daniil Medvedev to win his tenth ATP title, defeating him in two consecutive finals.

On his debut at the ATP Finals, Sinner won all of his round-robin matches, including beating the world No. 1 Novak Djokovic in a third set tiebreaker to clinch his fifth top-5 win in a row. He ultimately lost in a rematch against Djokovic in the final. He then made his debut in the Davis Cup, where he defeated Tallon Griekspoor in singles to help Italy win its quarterfinal tie against the Netherlands. In the semifinal, Sinner faced Djokovic for the third time in 11 days, and become the first player to defeat him in a Davis Cup singles match since Juan Martín del Potro in 2011. Sinner saved three consecutive match points in the third set to become only the fourth player to beat Djokovic from match points down and the first one to do so with three in a row. He also became only the third player ever to defeat Djokovic twice in 12 days, alongside Rafael Nadal and Andy Murray. Sinner then teamed up with Lorenzo Sonego for the decisive doubles match, defeating Djokovic and Miomir Kecmanovic to clinch the tie and help Italy reach the Davis Cup final for the first time since 1998. In the final, he defeated Australian Alex de Minaur to clinch the title for Italy for the second time after 47 years since 1976. Sinner was awarded the Most Improved Player of the Year award and voted the Fans' Favorite at the 2023 ATP Awards, while his coaches, Darren Cahill and Simone Vagnozzi, won the Coach of the Year award. Sinner also received the award for Best Tennis Player at the Supertennis Awards.

=== 2024: Hardcourt majors, world No. 1, sanctions ===
Sinner started his year at the Australian Open, where he beat Botic van de Zandschulp, Jesper de Jong, Sebastián Báez, Karen Khachanov, and Andrey Rublev (all in straight sets) to reach his second major semifinal and first at the Australian Open. In the semifinals, he upset world No. 1 and defending champion Novak Djokovic to advance to his first major final, becoming the first player not to face a break point against Djokovic in a completed major match. Sinner's victory over Djokovic was the latter's first defeat at the Australian Open since 2018. Sinner became the first Italian to reach the singles final at this major and the third man, after Adriano Panatta at the 1976 French Open and Matteo Berrettini at the 2021 Wimbledon Championships, to reach a major final in the Open Era. In the final, he came from a two-set deficit to beat Daniil Medvedev to become the first Italian to win the Australian Open singles title, and the third man to win a Major (the second of which in the Open Era), and the first in 48 years. His victory over Medvedev meant he became the second player to win the Australian Open after losing the first two sets in the final, after Rafael Nadal, who also beat Medvedev in 2022.

As the top seed at the Rotterdam Open, he recorded his 200th singles win in the quarterfinals, after Milos Raonic retired with a hip injury with Sinner leading by a set, becoming the first player born in the 2000s to accomplish this feat. After defeating Tallon Griekspoor in the semifinal and Alex de Minaur in the final, Sinner rose to a new career high of No. 3 in the world, becoming the highest-ranked Italian player in history. Sinner also became the first male player since Lleyton Hewitt, in 2001, to win his debut event as a major champion. At the 2024 BNP Paribas Open, with a victory over 25th seed Jan-Lennard Struff to reach the fourth round, he recorded his 17th consecutive match win, the longest ATP level streak for an Italian player in the Open Era. Sinner extended this to 19 consecutive wins (16–0 in 2024) by defeating Jiří Lehečka in the quarterfinal.

In March, Sinner played in Indian Wells, defeating Thanasi Kokkinakis, Jan-Lennard Struff, Ben Shelton, and Jiří Lehečka (all in straight sets) to advance to the semifinals. In the semifinals, he lost to Carlos Alcaraz in three sets. He also played in doubles with Lorenzo Sonego, defeating Karen Khachanov and Andrey Rublev in the first round in straight sets. In the second round, they lost to Marcel Granollers and Horacio Zeballos in straight sets. Later in the year, Sinner had his prize money and ranking points earned in Indian Wells forfeited by a tribunal in relation to a "no fault or negligence" anti-doping rule violation. At the 2024 Miami Open, Sinner defeated Grigor Dimitrov in the final to win his second Masters 1000 title. As a result, he climbed to a career high (and Italian record) ranking of No. 2 in the world. Sinner improved his 2024 ATP match record to 22–1.

Sinner's clay season saw his second defeat of the season, to Stefanos Tsitsipas at the Monte-Carlo Masters, in April. In May, Sinner withdrew from the Madrid Open, at the quarterfinal stage, due to a hip injury. Three days later, he withdrew from the Italian Open due to the same injury. After Novak Djokovic withdrew from the 2024 French Open on 4 June and following the conclusion of the tournament, Sinner became world No. 1 for the first time on 10 June. He became the first Italian to hold the top position in the rankings. Sinner lost in the semifinal to Alcaraz in five sets.

At the 2024 Halle Open, Sinner defeated Tallon Griekspoor, Fábián Marozsán, Jan-Lennard Struff, Zhang Zhizhen, and Hubert Hurkacz to win his debut tournament as world No. 1, becoming just the eighth male player to achieve this feat. Sinner improved his 2024 match record to 38–3. At the 2024 Wimbledon Championships, Sinner entered as the top seed in a major for the first time. He defeated Yannick Hanfmann, Matteo Berrettini, Miomir Kecmanović, and Ben Shelton, but lost to Daniil Medvedev in the quarterfinals in five sets, after a medical timeout for illness during the third set.

On 24 July 2024, Sinner announced he would not participate in the 2024 Summer Olympics due to tonsillitis.

Sinner won the 2024 Cincinnati Open, defeating Frances Tiafoe in the championship in straight sets. He also overcame Alex Michelsen, Andrey Rublev, and Alexander Zverev en route to his victory. This marks his second 1000 level title in the 2024 season and fifth title overall.

On 20 August, an independent tribunal announced that Sinner had tested positive, twice, for the banned substance clostebol in tests from March 2024. The tribunal accepted Sinner's explanation that the clostebol had entered his body via massages administered by his physiotherapist, who had used a treatment which contained clostebol to treat an injury on his own hands. In August 2024, Sinner announced that he had parted ways with his fitness coach Umberto Ferrara and physio Giacomo Naldi. The decision by the tribunal was to determine that Sinner bore "no fault or negligence" and no period of ineligibility would apply, but that he would forfeit prize money and ranking points earned at the Indian Wells tournament held in March. The World Anti-Doping Agency appealed the decision, and in February 2025 the appeal reached a settlement under which the positive drug tests were determined to be due to inadvertent contamination and Sinner was suspended for three months. The overall process was criticized by some active and former players.

Sinner won his second major at the 2024 US Open, defeating 5th seed Daniil Medvedev in the quarterfinals, getting revenge for his previous Wimbledon loss, 25th seed Jack Draper in the semifinals, and 12th seed Taylor Fritz in the final. He became the fourth man in more than 50 years to win his first two major titles in the same season. At the post-match ceremony, Sinner dedicated his win to his aunt. At age 23, Sinner became the youngest man ever to win both hard-court majors in the same year.

At the 2024 China Open, Sinner defeated Nicolas Jarry, Roman Safiullin, Jiří Lehečka, and Yunchaokete Bu to reach the final of the tournament, which he lost to Carlos Alcaraz in three sets.

After defeating Tomáš Machač in the Shanghai Masters semifinal, Sinner was confirmed as the year-end world No.1, becoming the first Italian player in history to achieve this ranking. Sinner then went on to win the championship against Novak Djokovic in straight sets to win his third ATP Masters 1000 title of the year, becoming the tournament's youngest-ever champion, and seventh overall title of 2024. In November, Sinner won the season's ATP Finals in Turin, Italy, by defeating Fritz. It was the first time since Ivan Lendl in 1986 in which a player won the trophy without losing any set, and the first time ever in which an Italian player won the title.

He ended the 2024 season by defeating Netherlands' Tallon Griekspoor in the Davis Cup final, to win Italy's second consecutive title. Sinner completed the entire season without a single straight-set defeat, becoming only the second man in the Open Era (Federer in 2005) to achieve this feat over a full year.

=== 2025: Australian & Wimbledon singles titles, suspension ===
Entering the 2025 Australian Open as the defending champion, Sinner beat Nicolás Jarry, Tristan Schoolkate, Marcos Giron, Holger Rune, and Alex de Minaur on his way to the semifinals. In the semifinals, he defeated Ben Shelton in straight sets. He then defeated Alexander Zverev in straight sets to successfully defend his title in the championship match on 26 January.

For his 2024 positive test for clostebol, the World Anti-Doping Agency (WADA) announced in February 2025 they entered a "case resolution agreement" with Sinner. WADA accepted the cause and explanation of the positive test but stated "an athlete bears responsibility for the entourage's negligence". A three-month suspension was handed down with Sinner being ineligible from tennis competition from 9 February to 4 May 2025. Some players reacted with criticism of the process, including Novak Djokovic who, at a press conference at the 2025 Qatar Open, expressed the opinion that "the majority of the players feel like there is favouritism happening" citing the advantages that high—ranked players have to rapid legal advice. Sinner's lawyer Jamie Singer was vocal of the criticism, speaking out against what he said was ill-informed commentary about the process and the suspension itself.

Another point of contention was the seemingly favorable placement of Sinner's suspension. Despite less than four months between the end of the 2025 Australian Open and the start of the 2025 French Open, Sinner's 3-month suspension would not include any of the majors or any preceding “warm-up” tournaments. In May 2025, Sinner played his first tournament since his suspension at the Italian Open, a warm-up tournament for the upcoming French Open, where he reached the final. In doing so, he became the first Italian man to reach the final of the Italian Open since Adriano Panatta in 1978. This marked the second career clay court final for Sinner, and first since July 2022. Sinner was then defeated in the final by Carlos Alcaraz in straight sets. At the French Open, he reached the final without losing a set en route, including against Novak Djokovic in the semifinals. It was Sinner's third career clay court final, all versus Carlos Alcaraz, and he was seeking his second clay court title, and first since July 2022. He faced Alcaraz in the final, and Sinner would take the first two sets before dropping the next two sets, which were nearly exact mirror images of the first two sets. In the fifth, decisive set, Sinner and Alcaraz would enter their third tiebreak of the match, and despite having held three championship points, Sinner would fall short to Alcaraz 2–10 in the super tiebreak. The 5-set final clocked in at 5 hours 29 minutes, making it the longest French Open final, shattering the previous record from the 1982 French Open, 4 hours 42 minutes.

Five weeks later, Sinner rebounded to win the Wimbledon Championships, defeating Alcaraz in four sets in the final. With the victory, he became the first Italian to win the Wimbledon singles championship. This was the second time Sinner faced Alcaraz on grass, the first being at the 2022 Wimbledon quarterfinals, winning both matches. After deciding to skip, like several other top players, the tournaments in Washington and Toronto due to the excessively congested calendar, Sinner reached the final of the Cincinnati Open, where he faced again Carlos Alcaraz, but retired before the end of the first set due to illness problems, having contracted a virus in the previous days.

In the following two weeks, he again reached the final of the US Open, playing his fifth consecutive major final, but was defeated in four sets by Carlos Alcaraz. He then reached the final of the ATP 500 in Beijing for the third consecutive time, winning in straight sets against the American Learner Tien and conquering his third title of the season. At the Shanghai Masters, Sinner had to retire in the third round against Tallon Griekspoor due to cramping. This would end his title defence in Shanghai. He then began his European indoor tour by winning the Vienna Open, defeating Alexander Zverev in the final in a three-set comeback match. It was his fourth title of the season. He finally won in the Paris Masters, where he defeated Canadian Felix Auger-Aliassime, without dropping a set during the tournament. He became the first Italian to win the tournament.

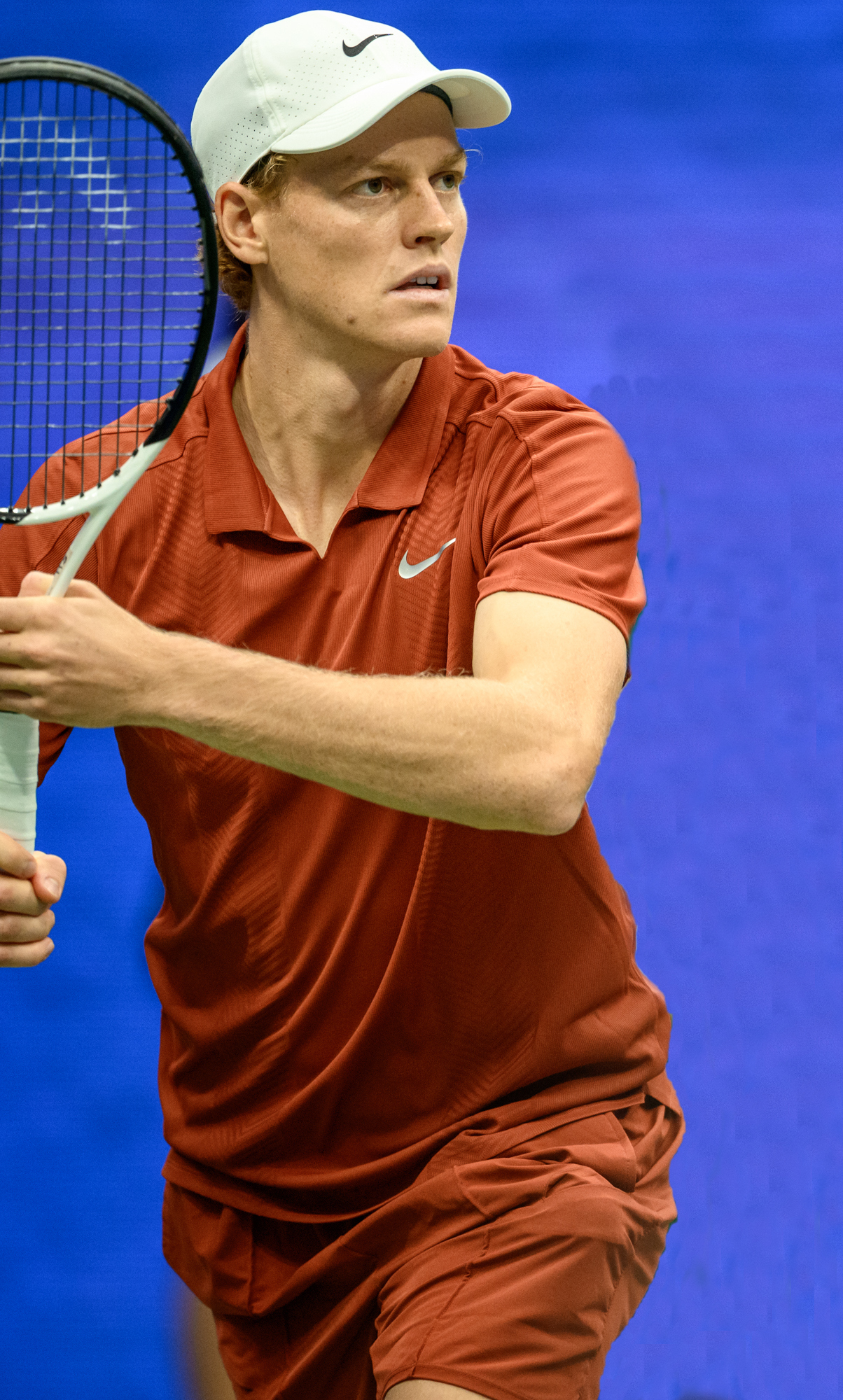
Sinner at the 2025 US Open

Sinner then successfully defended his title at the 2025 ATP Finals, winning all of his round-robin matches, defeating Alex de Minaur in the semifinals and defeating Alcaraz in the final, and not dropping a set during the tournament for the second year in a row, becoming the only player to win the finals without dropping a set for multiple years in a row, and suffering only one break in the entire tournament. Sinner also became the third player, after Federer and Djokovic, and the youngest, to reach the final of every major and the ATP Finals in the same season. This was Sinner's 21st career hard-court title and 24th career Tour title, improving his finals record to 21–7 on hard-courts and 24–9 overall.

=== 2026: Five ATP 1000 titles, Career Golden Masters, second Wimbledon title ===
In 2026, Sinner entered the Australian Open as the defending two-time champion. During the tournament, Sinner beat Hugo Gaston, James Duckworth, Eliot Spizzirri, Luciano Darderi and Ben Shelton on his way to the semifinals, which he went on to lose to Novak Djokovic in five sets. Afterwards, Sinner played at the 2026 Qatar ExxonMobil Open where he beat Tomáš Macháč and Alexei Popyrin to reach the quarterfinals. However, he suffered a shocking defeat to Jakub Menšík, making it the first time since 2024 that Sinner did not reach finals in back-to-back tournaments.

Sinner won his maiden Indian Wells title after defeating Daniil Medvedev in the final. He did not lose a set en route to the title, becoming the first man in history to win consecutive ATP Masters 1000 tournaments without losing a set. With his win, he became only the third male player in history to win all hard-court Big Titles (after Federer and Djokovic) and the youngest to do so, at 24 years old. At the 2026 Miami Open, Sinner defeated Jiří Lehečka in the final to complete the Sunshine Double (winning both Indian Wells and Miami in a calendar season) and became the first player (male or female) to achieve this feat without losing a set. He also became the first player to win three ATP Masters 1000 titles in a row without dropping a set. At the Monte-Carlo Masters he extended his streak to 37 consecutive sets won in 1000 level tournaments. Following the tournament, on 13 April 2026, Sinner regained the world No. 1 singles ranking from Alcaraz. Sinner was the third man (after Novak Djokovic and Rafael Nadal) to win four consecutive ATP Masters 1000 titles, and the first to win all of the first three ATP Masters 1000 events of the season since Djokovic in 2015.

At the 2026 Madrid Open, Sinner defeated Alexander Zverev in the final. As a result, he became the first man to win the first four ATP Masters 1000 events of a season, as well as the first to win five consecutive 1000 level titles, since the series started in 1990, surpassing the record of four consecutive titles by Djokovic and Rafael Nadal. With his triumph, Sinner also accumulated 14,350 ATP ranking points, setting the third-highest points total in ATP history, behind only Djokovic (16,950 points) and Nadal (15,390 points).

At the 2026 Italian Open, Sinner defeated Casper Ruud in the final. With this win, he joined Djokovic as the second man in history to win all nine ATP Masters 1000 events and became the youngest player to accomplish this feat. He also extended his record for the most consecutive ATP 1000 titles won in a row, with six.

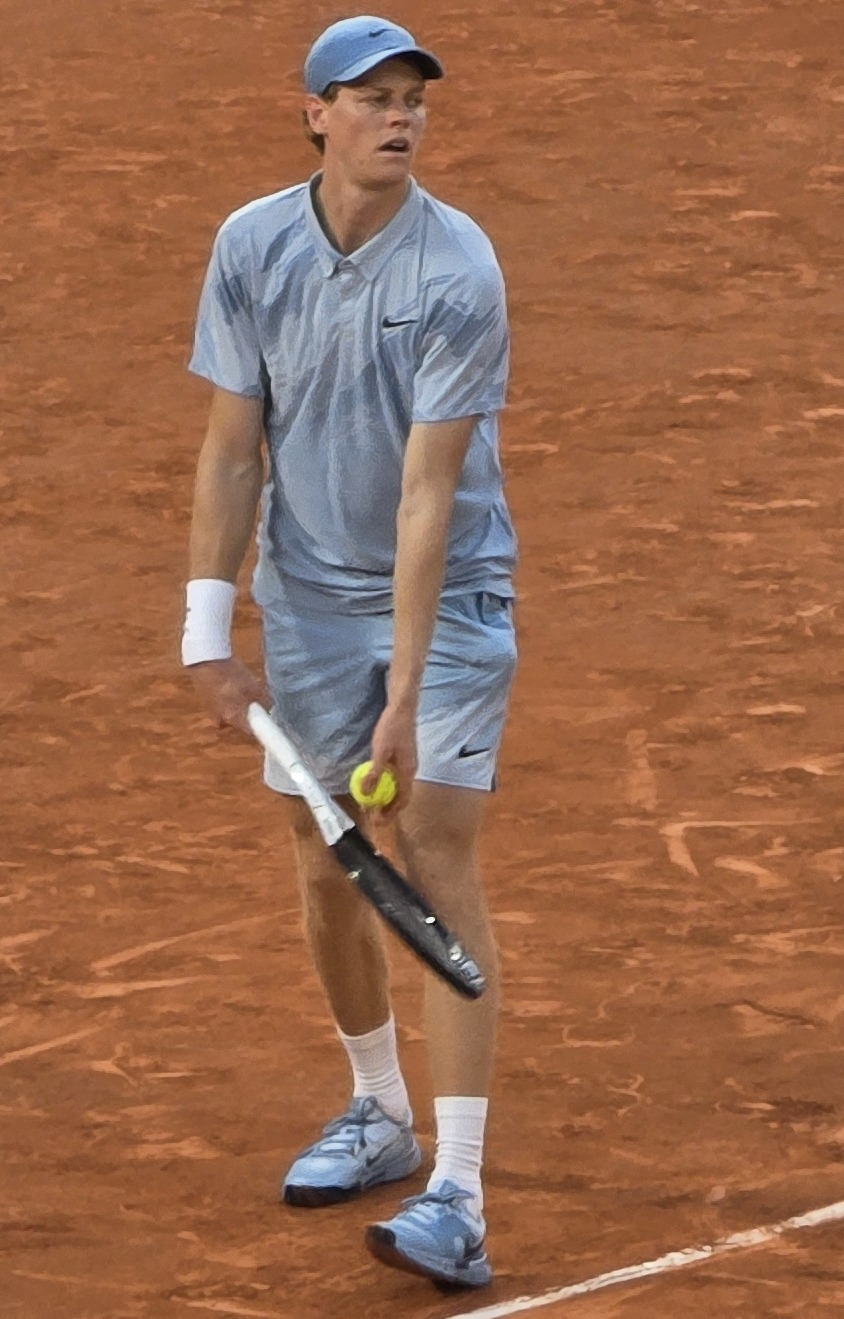
Sinner at the 2026 French Open

At the 2026 French Open, where Sinner was attempting to complete a Career Grand Slam, Sinner suffered a shocking second round defeat to world No. 56 Juan Manuel Cerúndolo due to heat stress, winning just two of the final twenty games after winning the first two sets and being up 5–1 in the third set. Sinner's loss ended a streak of nine consecutive major titles won between him and Alcaraz, dating back to the 2024 Australian Open, as well as a career-best winning streak of 30 matches. This marked the first time an incumbent world No. 1 failed to reach the third round of the French Open since Andre Agassi in 2000, and was the first time Sinner lost before the fourth round of a major since the 2023 French Open.

At the 2026 Wimbledon, Sinner began on a shaky note, down 2–1 in the first round, before coming back to win the final 2 sets against Miomir Kecmanović. Sinner then didn't lose a single set in the next 4 matches before beating Novak Djokovic 3–0 in the semifinals, to set up a finals matchup against Alexander Zverev. Sinner went on to claim his second consecutive Wimbledon title by defeating Zverev in four sets. It was Sinner's 100th Grand Slam match win.

Having not played a match since Wimbledon, Sinner announced that he would no longer compete for the rest of the season.

== Rivalries ==
=== Carlos Alcaraz ===
Jannik Sinner and Carlos Alcaraz have faced each other 17 times since 2021, with Sinner trailing the rivalry 7–10. Their rivalry has been described as "potentially era-defining".

Before 2025, the duo already played several high-profile matches, such as the 2024 French Open semifinal, which Alcaraz won in five sets, the 2022 US Open quarterfinal, which Sinner lost in five sets after holding a match point against the eventual champion, and the 2023 Miami semifinal, won by Sinner. The pair met three times on the tour in 2024, with Sinner losing all three matches, notably their third meeting at the 2024 China Open. The pair faced each other for the first time in 2025 at the Italian Open final with Sinner losing in straight sets. The two then played each other in major finals for the first time that year. At the French Open, Sinner lost in five sets despite winning the first two and holding three match points in the fourth set. At Wimbledon, Sinner won in four sets and dethroned two-time defending champion Alcaraz. At the US Open Alcaraz beat Sinner in four sets, leaving each other with two major titles each for 2025.

At the 2025 ATP Finals, Sinner beat Alcaraz in two sets to retain the title, ending the year at number two and number one respectively on the ATP tour ranking. Sinner beat Alcaraz in two sets again at the Monte-Carlo Masters tournament in 2026, once again taking the world number one ranking.

=== Daniil Medvedev ===
Jannik Sinner and Daniil Medvedev have met 17 times since 2020, with Sinner leading the rivalry 10–7. The rivalry used to be one-sided in favor of Medvedev, with the Russian winning their first six matches. Sinner disrupted this streak in late 2023 by winning the next five, and eventually leveling the head-to-head. The two have played a number of high-profile matches, most notably the 2024 Australian Open final, which Sinner won in five sets after being down two-sets-to-love to claim his first major title. They met again in the 2024 Wimbledon quarterfinals, which Medvedev won in five sets, and the 2024 US Open quarterfinal, which Sinner won in four sets en route to the title.

=== Novak Djokovic ===
Jannik Sinner and Novak Djokovic have met 12 times, with Sinner leading the rivalry 7–5. Their first encounter came in the 2021 Monte-Carlo Masters. Djokovic won their first three encounters, with Sinner recording his first win in the 2023 ATP Finals. The pair have played some notable matches, including the final of the 2023 ATP Finals, which Djokovic won, the 2024 Australian Open semifinal, which Sinner won in four sets, and the 2024 Shanghai Masters final, which Sinner won in straight sets. They met back to back in the semifinals at the 2025 French Open and 2025 Wimbledon, where Sinner won both times in straight sets. Their next encounter was at the 2026 Australian Open semifinal, where Djokovic won in five sets, ending his losing streak against Sinner. Sinner then exacted his revenge on Djokovic at the 2026 Wimbledon Championships semifinal with a straight sets win.

== Playing style ==
Sinner is an aggressive baseliner and is one of the hardest hitters on the ATP tour. Sinner's groundstroke strength is his two-handed-backhand, which he hits with more topspin than any other player on the tour, registering an average of 1858 revolutions per minute on the shot along with the fifth-best average speed of 111.2 km/h (69.1 mph).

Sinner has been compared to Roger Federer for his calm on-court demeanour and all-court movement. Federer himself has praised Sinner for the balance in his game, remarking, "What I like about him is that he almost has the same speed of shooting from the forehand and backhand." Former world No. 1 junior and tennis coach Claudio Pistolesi has praised Sinner's good lateral movement, which he attributes in part to Sinner's background in skiing. In this regard, Sinner has been compared to Novak Djokovic, who also credits a background in skiing for improving his tennis skills.

Following his loss at the 2025 US Open to Carlos Alcaraz, Jannik Sinner deliberately expanded his baseline-oriented playstyle during the 2026 season. He integrated more variety into his shot selection. He began incorporating backhand slices, drop shots, and defensive lobs to complement his trademark aggressive groundstrokes. Sinner significantly increased his frequency of approaching the net. During his successful 2026 Wimbledon title defence, he maintained a net-point conversion rate of over 80%, highlighted by winning 17 of 20 net approaches in his semifinal match against Novak Djokovic.

Sinner plays with contact lenses and has stated that he cannot even see the ball without them.

== Coaches and team ==
When Sinner began to prioritise tennis at age thirteen, he was coached by Riccardo Piatti, who had also been a part-time coach of Novak Djokovic and Milos Raonic. At the time, he also began working with Andrea Volpini and Massimo Sartori, the latter of whom was a longtime coach of Andreas Seppi. He continued to work with Piatti as his primary coach, and Volpini as his second coach. His team also consisted of physiotherapist Claudio Zimaglia and fitness coach Dalibor Širola.

In February 2022, he ended his long collaboration with Piatti and his team and began to train with Simone Vagnozzi, ex-coach of Marco Cecchinato, new fitness coach Umberto Ferrara and physiotherapist. In July 2022, coach Darren Cahill officially joined Sinner's team. Instead of hiring a mental coach like other tennis players, Sinner uses Formula Medicine, an Italian mental training program developed for Formula 1 drivers. In early 2023, he hired Giacomo Naldi as his personal physiotherapist. In September 2024, he replaced Ferrara and Naldi with Novak Djokovic's former fitness trainer Marco Panichi and physiotherapist Ulises Badio. He also works with osteopath Andrea Cipolla. On 23 July 2025, Sinner announced that he had reappointed his former fitness trainer Umberto Ferrara as his fitness coach with immediate effect. Sinner's father, a chef, cooks for the team at major tournaments.

== Endorsements and corporate sponsorships ==
At age 17, Sinner signed sponsorship deals with Nike and Head in 2019 for tennis footwear, apparel, and equipment. In 2020, when he was eighteen years old and not yet in the top 50 of the ATP rankings, Sinner signed a global ambassador contract with Rolex. In October that year, when he was ranked no. 46, he signed a sponsorship contract with Alfa Romeo. In 2021, he signed with Intesa Sanpaolo. In 2022, Sinner signed a new $150 million sponsorship contract with Nike spanning ten years and became the face of Gucci and Lavazza. In 2023, Sinner signed a partnership with Formula 1 to help attract a young, diverse audience to the motorsport. In 2024, L’Oréal’s skincare brand La-Roche Posay appointed Sinner as their global brand advocate to help raise awareness about sun protection. Some of his other sponsors include FASTWEB, De Cecco, Panini Comics, Technogym, Enervit, Parmigiano Reggiano, and Pigna. In August 2025, Sinner was named a global brand ambassador for the Explora Journeys.

== Business ventures ==
He ventured into the investment world in 2022, diversifying his assets through four different companies that he registered in his place of residence, Monte Carlo. His real estate company owns properties at Corso Venezia in the historic centre of Milan.

In 2022, Sinner released the comic book Piccoli grandi campioni: Il manuale illustrato del tennis di Jannik Sinner through Panini Comics, an illustrated tennis manual for children in which an illustrated character of Sinner explains tennis and gives advice to beginners.

== Philanthropy, advocacy and public service ==
During the COVID-19 pandemic in 2020, Sinner launched his mental health initiative What's Kept You Moving, a series in which he interviewed other young athletes about overcoming mental health challenges in sports. In 2022, Sinner became the face of the "An Ace for Research" initiative for cancer research, committing to a donation for the purchase of modern lasers to diagnose cancers in men for every ace he scored in the ATP Finals, and later visited the research laboratories at The Candiolo Cancer Institute.

In 2022, Sinner hosted Breaking Points, a video series created by GQ where he interviewed sports icons about mental health. In 2023, he was featured in GQ’s short film series A Hero’s Journey, released also as a podcast.

In September 2024, Sinner was announced as the ambassador for the 2026 Winter Olympics volunteer program.

In April 2025, Sinner announced the launch of the Jannik Sinner Foundation, a non-profit organization that aims to empower children around the globe through education and sports.

== In other media and popular culture ==
=== Branding and public image ===
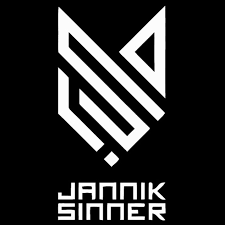
Jannik Sinner's logo

Sinner's nickname is The Fox, which inspired the design of his logo. A group of his Italian fans called the Carota Boys has garnered wide media attention for supporting him at major tournaments around the world dressed in carrot costumes.

=== Cultural impact and honors ===
Sinner has been the subject of incessant media attention in Italy and has been credited with the surge in the popularity of tennis in the country. It has been referred to as the Sinner Effect. Following his Davis Cup and Australian Open titles, Sinner was honored by the Prime Minister of Italy, Giorgia Meloni, in Chigi Palace in Rome and met with the President of Italy, Sergio Mattarella. Italy's Minister of Foreign Affairs, Antonio Tajani, appointed Sinner as Ambassador of Sports Diplomacy. Sinner subsequently declined an official invitation supported by the Prime Minister to appear at Italy's Sanremo Music Festival. The invitation caused controversy and public debate, with the president of The Italian Tennis Federation publicly advising Sinner against accepting it, stating that he must be protected from excessive media exposure and "should not be exploited". In June 2024, he received honorary citizenship of Sexten where he grew up. Outside Italy, Sinner has been labeled "the atypical Italian" by media outlets, a description he has agreed with.

In June 2026, the asteroid 120097 Janniksinner was named after him.

=== Fashion and media profiles ===
During Wimbledon in 2023, Sinner entered Centre Court carrying a monogrammed beige leather Gucci duffel bag, breaking Wimbledon's all-white dress code, which made him the first tennis player to do so. The accessory prompted worldwide media coverage and commentary, with CNN pondering whether Sinner's bag signals a shift in Wimbledon's strict traditions.

The Times has described Sinner as "the Gucci model with a shock of red hair and a surprisingly gangly frame".

Diventare Sinner, a book written by Enzo Anderloni, Michelangelo Dell'Edera and Alessandro Mastroluca in collaboration with the Italian Tennis Federation was published on 15 May 2024 by Giunti Editore. It follows Sinner's evolution from a junior ski champion to a professional tennis player and major champion.

In 2024, Forbes has named Sinner on their 30 Under 30 Europe list for 2024. In the same year, Time has named Sinner on their Time 100 Next list for 2024. In May 2025, Sinner met with Pope Leo XIV, who is an avid tennis fan.

In 2025, Sinner was featured in an Andrea Bocelli single in a spoken word role.

== Personal life ==
Sinner resides in Monte Carlo in Monaco, where he moved at the age of 18.

Sinner is fluent in German, Italian and English, with German being his first language. He grew up in a German-speaking household and attended a primary school where instruction was in German. His Italian improved greatly after moving to Bordighera at the age of 13 from daily contact with teammates, coaches and school friends.

Sinner is an avid fan of the Italian football club AC Milan. One of his tennis idols is compatriot Andreas Seppi, who is also from South Tyrol. At age 17, Sinner stated that one of his goals was to "do better than [Seppi]".

Sinner was in a relationship with Italian fashion model Maria Braccini from 2020 to 2024. Beginning in June 2024, he was dating Russian tennis pro Anna Kalinskaya. In May 2025, Sinner confirmed they had broken up.

== Career statistics ==
=== Grand Slam tournament performance timeline ===
Key
W	F	SF	QF	#R	RR	Q#	DNQ	A	NH

(W) winner; (F) finalist; (SF) semifinalist; (QF) quarterfinalist; (#R) rounds 4, 3, 2, 1; (RR) round-robin stage; (Q#) qualification round; (DNQ) did not qualify; (A) absent; (NH) not held; (SR) strike rate (events won / competed); (W–L) win–loss record.
To avoid confusion and double counting, these charts are updated at the conclusion of a tournament or when the player's participation has ended.

Current through the 2026 Wimbledon Championships

Tournament	2019	2020	2021	2022	2023	2024	2025	2026	SR	W–L	Win%
Australian Open	A	2R	1R	QF	4R	W	W	SF	2 / 7	27–5	84%
French Open	A	QF	4R	4R	2R	SF	F	2R	0 / 7	23–7	77%
Wimbledon	Q1	NH	1R	QF	SF	QF	W	W	2 / 6	27–4	87%
US Open	1R	1R	4R	QF	4R	W	F	A	1 / 7	23–6	79%
Win–loss	0–1	5–3	6–4	15–4	12–4	23–2	26–2	13–2	5 / 27	100–22	82%

Source: ATP profile

=== Grand Slam tournament finals ===
==== Singles: 7 (5 titles, 2 runner-ups) ====
Result	Year	Tournament	Surface	Opponent	Score
Win	2024	Australian Open	Hard	Daniil Medvedev	3–6, 3–6, 6–4, 6–4, 6–3
Win	2024	US Open	Hard	(United States) Taylor Fritz	6–3, 6–4, 7–5
Win	2025	Australian Open (2)	Hard	(Germany) Alexander Zverev	6–3, 7–6^{(7–4)}, 6–3
Loss	2025	French Open	Clay	(Spain) Carlos Alcaraz	6–4, 7–6^{(7–4)}, 4–6, 6–7^{(3–7)}, 6–7^{(2–10)}
Win	2025	Wimbledon	Grass	(Spain) Carlos Alcaraz	4–6, 6–4, 6–4, 6–4
Loss	2025	US Open	Hard	(Spain) Carlos Alcaraz	2–6, 6–3, 1–6, 4–6
Win	2026	Wimbledon (2)	Grass	(Germany) Alexander Zverev	6–7^{(7–9)}, 7–6^{(7–2)}, 6–3, 6–4

=== Year–End Championships performance timeline ===
Tournament	2019	2020	2021	2022	2023	2024	2025	2026	SR	W–L	Win %
ATP Finals	DNQ		RR	DNQ	F	W	W	A (Note: Qualified but did not compete due to injury)	2 / 4	15–2	88%

=== Year-end Championships finals ===
==== Singles: 3 (2 titles, 1 runner-up) ====
Result	Year	Tournament	Surface	Opponent	Score
Loss	2023	ATP Finals	Hard (i)	(Serbia) Novak Djokovic	3–6, 3–6
Win	2024	ATP Finals	Hard (i)	(United States) Taylor Fritz	6–4, 6–4
Win	2025	ATP Finals (2)	Hard (i)	(Spain) Carlos Alcaraz	7–6^{(7–4)}, 7–5

== Records ==
=== Open Era records ===
- These records were attained in the Open Era of tennis and in ATP Masters series since 1990.
- Records in **bold** indicate peer-less achievements.

Tournament	Since	Record accomplished	Players matched
**ATP Tour**	1990	Completed a full season without straight-sets loss	Roger Federer
**ATP Tour**	1990	Completed a full season without straight-sets loss (all losses in deciding sets)	**Stands Alone**
**ATP Tour**	1990	Won two majors, the ATP Finals, and the Davis Cup in a single season	**Stands Alone**
**ATP Tour**	1990	Completed the hard-court treble (AO, USO, and ATP Finals) in a single season	Novak Djokovic; Roger Federer
**ATP Tour**	1990	Youngest male player to complete the hard-court treble (AO, USO, and ATP Finals) in a single season – 23 years, 3 months and 1 day	**Stands Alone**
**ATP Tour**	1990	10 consecutive matches won in straight sets against opponents in the top-10	**Stands Alone**
**ATP Tour**	1990	Most wins (47) in first 50 matches as world No. 1	Bjorn Borg; Jimmy Connors
**ATP Tour**	1990	Consecutive seasons with 90%+ win rate	Bjorn Borg; Jimmy Connors; Ivan Lendl; Roger Federer
**ATP Tour**	1990	22 consecutive sets won against opponents in the top-10	**Stands Alone**
**Grand Slam** **tournaments**	1968	Won a final from two sets down	Björn Borg; Ivan Lendl; Andre Agassi; Gastón Gaudio; Dominic Thiem; Novak Djokovic; Rafael Nadal; Carlos Alcaraz
**Grand Slam** **tournaments**	1968	Won a final without conceding break point	Pete Sampras; Rafael Nadal; Roger Federer
**Grand Slam** **tournaments**	1968	Youngest male player to win two hard-court majors in the same calendar season – 23 years and 23 days	**Stands Alone**
**Grand Slam** **tournaments**	1968	Won the first and second career majors in the same calendar season	Jimmy Connors; Guillermo Vilas; Alexander Zverev
**Grand Slam** **tournaments**	1968	Youngest male player to reach 5 consecutive Grand Slam tournament finals – 24 years and 21 days	**Stands Alone**
**Grand Slam** **tournaments**	1968	Youngest male player to make the quarterfinals of all four majors in a year twice in a row – 23 years and 17 days	**Stands Alone**
**ATP Masters 1000**	1990	Youngest male player to complete the Career Golden Masters (Note: Winning all 9 active ATP Masters 1000 events.) – 24 years, 9 months and 1 day	**Stands Alone**
**ATP Masters 1000**	1990	Fastest male player to complete the Career Golden Masters (Note: Winning all 9 active ATP Masters 1000 events.) – 2 years, 9 months and 4 days	**Stands Alone**
**ATP Masters 1000**	1990	Won consecutive ATP Masters 1000 tournaments without losing a set	**Stands Alone**
**ATP Masters 1000**	1990	Won three consecutive ATP Masters 1000 tournaments without losing a set	**Stands Alone**
**ATP Masters 1000**	1990	Won six consecutive ATP Masters 1000 tournaments	**Stands Alone**
**ATP Masters 1000**	1990	Won 34 consecutive ATP Masters 1000 matches	**Stands Alone**
**ATP Masters 1000**	1990	Won 37 consecutive sets in ATP Masters 1000 matches	**Stands Alone**
**ATP Masters 1000**	1990	Completed the Sunshine Double without losing a set	**Stands Alone**
**ATP Masters 1000**	1990	Won the first five ATP Masters 1000 events of the season	**Stands Alone**
**ATP Masters 1000**	1990	Won the Miami Open and Monte-Carlo Masters back-to-back	Novak Djokovic
**ATP Masters 1000**	1990	Won the Clay Triple in the same calendar season	Rafael Nadal
**Australian Open**	1968	Won an Australian Open final without conceding break point	**Stands Alone**
**French Open**	1968	Played the longest French Open final by duration (5 hours, 29 minutes)	Carlos Alcaraz
**Indian Wells Open**	1974	Won the title without losing a set	Carlos Alcaraz; Jimmy Connors; Joakim Nyström; Rafael Nadal; Roger Federer
**Miami Open**	1985	Won the title without losing a set	Ivan Lendl; Novak Djokovic
**Shanghai Masters**	2009	Youngest male singles champion – 23 years, 1 month and 27 days	**Stands Alone**
**Paris Masters**	1969	Won the title without losing a set	Amos Mansdorf; Novak Djokovic; Roger Federer; Stefan Edberg; Thomas Enqvist; Tom Okker
**Next Gen ATP Finals**	2017	Youngest male singles champion – 18 years, 2 months and 24 days	**Stands Alone**
**ATP Finals**	2017	Won the Next Gen ATP Finals and ATP Finals in a career	Stefanos Tsitsipas
**ATP Finals**	1970	Youngest male singles champion as world No. 1 – 23 years, 3 months and 1 day	**Stands Alone**
**ATP Finals**	1970	Fewest games lost (33) to win the title	**Stands Alone**
**ATP Finals**	1970	Won the title without losing a set	Ivan Lendl
**ATP Finals**	1970	Won two consecutive titles without losing a set	**Stands Alone**

- Jannik Sinner is the youngest male player to reach the singles finals of all four Grand Slam tournaments in a single year (2025).
- Jannik Sinner is the youngest male player to reach the singles finals of all four Grand Slam tournaments and the ATP Finals in a single year (2025).
- Jannik Sinner holds the record for the highest percentage of points won (56.45%) in a season (2025) in ATP history.
- Jannik Sinner is the only player in ATP history to finish a season (2025) as No. 1 in percentage of games won on both serve and return.
- Jannik Sinner is the youngest male player to complete the hard-court Big Titles set in a career (2026).

== Awards and honours ==
Sinner has received the following awards and honours:

=== Professional awards ===
- ATP Newcomer of the Year – 2019
- FITP Most Improved Player of the Year – 2019
- FITP Best Player of the Year (5) – 2020, 2021, 2023, 2024, 2025
- ATP Most Improved Player of the Year – 2023
- ATP Fans' Favourite Player (3) – 2023, 2024, 2025
- ATP Player of the Year – 2024
- ITF World Champion (2) – 2024, 2025

=== Media awards ===
- Gazzetta dello Sport Performance of the Year – 2019
- Gazzetta dello Sport Exploit of the Year – 2020
- Gazzetta dello Sport Italian Sportsman of the Year – 2024
- Time 100 Most Influential People in Sports – 2026

=== Orders ===
- CONI Golden Collar of Sports Merit (Collare d'Oro al Merito Sportivo) (3) – 2023, 2024, 2025
- CONI Honor Diploma of Sports Merit (Diploma d'Onore al merito sportivo) – 2026

==== Special awards ====
- Honorary citizen of Sexten (2024)

== Discography ==
=== Singles ===
==== As featured artist ====
Singles
Year	Title	Album
2025	"Polvere e Gloria" (Andrea Bocelli featuring Jannik Sinner)	Non-album singles

== See also ==
- Jannik Sinner career statistics
- Italian players best ranking
- List of ATP number 1 ranked singles tennis players (since 1973)
- List of Grand Slam men's singles champions
- List of Australian Open men's singles champions
- List of US Open men's singles champions
- List of Wimbledon gentlemen's singles champions
- Tennis Masters Series records and statistics
- Davis Cup winning players
- Tennis in Italy

== Notes ==
Sporting positions
Preceded by Novak Djokovic; Carlos Alcaraz; Carlos Alcaraz	World No. 1; 10 June 2024 – 7 September 2025; 3 November 2025 – 9 November 2025; 13 April 2026 – 1 November 2026	Succeeded by Carlos Alcaraz; Carlos Alcaraz; Alexander Zverev
Awards
Preceded by Alex de Minaur	ATP Newcomer of the Year; 2019	Succeeded by Carlos Alcaraz
Preceded by Carlos Alcaraz	ATP Most Improved Player of the Year; 2023	Succeeded by Giovanni Mpetshi Perricard
Preceded by Rafael Nadal	ATP Fans' Favourite Player; 2023–2025	Succeeded by Incumbent
Preceded by Novak Djokovic	ATP Player of the Year; 2024	Succeeded by Carlos Alcaraz
Preceded by Gianmarco Tamberi	Gazzetta dello Sport; Italian Sportsman of the Year; 2024	Succeeded by Lorenzo Musetti
Preceded by Novak Djokovic	ITF World Champion; 2024, 2025	Succeeded by Incumbent
