= 2021 Croatia Open Umag =

- Date: 19–25 July
- Edition: 31st
- Category: ATP Tour 250
- Draw: 28S/16D
- Prize money: €481,270
- Surface: Clay
- Location: Umag, Croatia

Champions

Singles
- (Spain) Carlos Alcaraz

Doubles
- (Brazil) Fernando Romboli / (Spain) David Vega Hernández
- Croatia Open

The 2021 Croatia Open Umag, also known as the Plava Laguna Croatia Open Umag (for sponsorship reasons), is a men's tennis tournament played on outdoor clay courts. It is the 31st edition of the Croatia Open, and part of the 250 Series of the 2021 ATP Tour. It take place at the International Tennis Center in Umag, Croatia, from 19 through 25 July 2021. Seventh-seeded Carlos Alcaraz won the singles title.

== Finals ==
=== Singles ===
(Spain) Carlos Alcaraz defeated (France) Richard Gasquet, 6–2, 6–2

- It was Alcaraz's only singles title of the year and the 1st of his career.

=== Doubles ===
(Brazil) Fernando Romboli / (Spain) David Vega Hernández defeated (Bosnia and Herzegovina) Tomislav Brkić / (Serbia) Nikola Ćaćić, 6–3, 7–5

== Points and prize money ==
=== Point distribution ===
Event	W	F	SF	QF	Round of 16	Round of 32	Q	Q2	Q1
Singles	250	150	90	45	20	0	12	6	0
Doubles	250	150	90	45	0	—N/a	—N/a	—N/a	—N/a

=== Prize money ===
Event	W	F	SF	QF	Round of 16	Round of 32	Q2	Q1
Singles	€41,145	€29,500	€21,000	€14,000	€9,000	€5,415	€2,645	€1,375
Doubles*	€15,360	€11,000	€7,250	€4,710	€2,760	—N/a	—N/a	—N/a

_{*per team}

== Singles main draw entrants ==
=== Seeds ===
Country	Player	Rank^{1}	Seed
ESP	Albert Ramos Viñolas	41	1
SRB	Dušan Lajović	43	2
SRB	Filip Krajinović	44	3
FRA	Richard Gasquet	54	4
SLO	Aljaž Bedene	56	5
ESP	Jaume Munar	66	6
ESP	Carlos Alcaraz	72	7
ITA	Gianluca Mager	73	8

- ^{1} Rankings are as of 12 July 2021.

=== Other entrants ===
The following players received wildcards into the main draw:

- (Croatia) Duje Ajduković
- (Denmark) Holger Rune
- (Croatia) Nino Serdarušić

The following players received entry from the qualifying draw:

- (Germany) Daniel Altmaier
- (Argentina) Andrea Collarini
- (Italy) Alessandro Giannessi
- (Slovakia) Filip Horanský

The following player received entry as a lucky loser:

- (Argentina) Renzo Olivo

=== Withdrawals ===
Before the tournament

- (Italy) Salvatore Caruso → replaced by (Argentina) Renzo Olivo
- (Japan) Taro Daniel → replaced by (Slovakia) Andrej Martin
- (Italy) Lorenzo Musetti → replaced by (Spain) Carlos Taberner

== Doubles main draw entrants ==
=== Seeds ===
Country	Player	Country	Player	Rank^{1}	Seed
BIH	Tomislav Brkić	SRB	Nikola Ćaćić	101	1
URU	Pablo Cuevas	FRA	Fabrice Martin	165	2
BRA	Rafael Matos	BLR	Andrei Vasilevski	165	3
VEN	Luis David Martínez	NZL	Artem Sitak	195	4

- ^{1} Rankings are as of 12 July 2021.

=== Other entrants ===
The following pairs received wildcards into the doubles main draw:

- (Croatia) Duje Ajduković / (Croatia) Frane Ninčević
- (Croatia) Admir Kalender / (Croatia) Mili Poljičak

=== Withdrawals ===
Before the tournament

- (Italy) Simone Bolelli / (Argentina) Máximo González → replaced by (Bosnia and Herzegovina) Damir Džumhur / (Croatia) Antonio Šančić
