= 2018 Croatia Open Umag =

- Date: 15 – 22 July
- Edition: 29th
- Category: ATP World Tour 250
- Draw: 28S/16D
- Prize money: €482,060
- Surface: Clay
- Location: Umag, Croatia

Champions

Singles
- (Italy) Marco Cecchinato

Doubles
- (Netherlands) Robin Haase / (Netherlands) Matwé Middelkoop
- Croatia Open

The 2018 Croatia Open Umag (also known as the Plava Laguna Croatia Open Umag for sponsorship reasons) was a men's tennis tournament played on outdoor clay courts. It was the 29th edition of the Croatia Open, and part of the ATP World Tour 250 Series of the 2018 ATP World Tour. It took place at the International Tennis Center in Umag, Croatia, from 15 July through 22 July 2018. Third-seeded Marco Cecchinato won the singles title.

== Finals ==
=== Singles ===
(Italy) Marco Cecchinato defeated (Argentina) Guido Pella, 6–2, 7–6^{(7–4)}

- It was Cecchinato's 2nd and last singles title of the year and the 2nd of his career.

=== Doubles ===
(Netherlands) Robin Haase / (Netherlands) Matwé Middelkoop defeated (Czech Republic) Roman Jebavý / (Czech Republic) Jiří Veselý, 6–4, 6–4

== ATP singles main draw entrants ==
=== Seeds ===
Country	Player	Rank^{1}	Seed
~~GBR~~	~~Kyle Edmund~~	~~17~~	~~1~~
BIH	Damir Džumhur	23	2
ITA	Marco Cecchinato	29	3
RUS	Andrey Rublev	33	4
ESP	Albert Ramos Viñolas	38	5
NED	Robin Haase	43	6
POR	João Sousa	45	7
FRA	Benoît Paire	47	8
GER	Maximilian Marterer	48	9

- ^{1} Rankings are as of July 2, 2018

=== Other entrants ===
The following players received wildcards into the singles main draw:

- (Canada) Félix Auger-Aliassime
- (Croatia) Nino Serdarušić
- (Croatia) Franko Škugor

The following players received entry from the qualifying draw:

- (Brazil) Rogério Dutra Silva
- (Slovakia) Martin Kližan
- (Italy) Stefano Travaglia
- (Argentina) Marco Trungelliti

The following player received entry as a lucky loser:

- (Slovakia) Andrej Martin

=== Withdrawals ===
Before the tournament

- (United Kingdom) Kyle Edmund → replaced by (Slovakia) Andrej Martin
- (Spain) Guillermo García López → replaced by (Serbia) Laslo Đere
- (Serbia) Filip Krajinović → replaced by (Japan) Taro Daniel
- (Italy) Andreas Seppi → replaced by (Argentina) Guido Pella

== ATP doubles main draw entrants ==
=== Seeds ===
Country	Player	Country	Player	Rank^{1}	Seed
GBR	Dominic Inglot	CRO	Franko Škugor	67	1
NED	Robin Haase	NED	Matwé Middelkoop	77	2
CRO	Antonio Šančić	BLR	Andrei Vasilevski	129	3
FRA	Jonathan Eysseric	FRA	Hugo Nys	133	4

- Rankings are as of July 2, 2018

=== Other entrants ===
The following pairs received wildcards into the doubles main draw:

- (Croatia) Marin Draganja / (Croatia) Tomislav Draganja
- (Croatia) Ivan Sabanov / (Croatia) Matej Sabanov

The following pair received entry as alternates:

- (Chile) Nicolás Jarry / (Ecuador) Roberto Quiroz

=== Withdrawals ===
Before the tournament

- (Uruguay) Ariel Behar
