= 2010 ECM Prague Open =

- Date: 12–18 July
- Edition: 9th
- Category: WTA International
- Draw: 32S / 16D
- Prize money: $220,000
- Surface: Clay / outdoor
- Location: Prague, Czech Republic
- Venue: I. Czech Lawn Tennis Club

Champions

Singles
- (Hungary) Ágnes Szávay

Doubles
- (Switzerland) Timea Bacsinszky / (Italy) Tathiana Garbin
- ECM Prague Open

The 2010 ECM Prague Open, also known as 2010 ECM Prague Open by Glanzis, was a women's tennis tournament played on outdoor clay courts. It was the 9th edition of the ECM Prague Open, and was part of the WTA International tournaments of the 2010 WTA Tour. It took place in Prague, Czech Republic, from 12 July through 18 July 2010. Seventh-seeded Ágnes Szávay won the singles title.

This was the last edition of ECM Prague Open due to financial distress.

== Finals ==
=== Singles ===
(Hungary) Ágnes Szávay defeated (Czech Republic) Barbora Záhlavová-Strýcová, 6–2, 1–6, 6–2

- It was Szávay's second title of the year and 5th of her career.

=== Doubles ===
(Switzerland) Timea Bacsinszky / (Italy) Tathiana Garbin defeated (Romania) Monica Niculescu / (Hungary) Ágnes Szávay, 7–5, 7–6^{(7–4)}

== WTA entrants ==
=== Seeds ===
Player	Nationality	Ranking*	Seeding
Lucie Šafářová	Czech Republic	25	1
Alexandra Dulgheru	Romania	30	2
Timea Bacsinszky	Switzerland	39	3
~~Klára Zakopalová~~	~~Czech Republic~~	~~43~~	~~4~~
Anabel Medina Garrigues	Spain	46	5
~~Gisela Dulko~~	~~Argentina~~	~~48~~	~~6~~
Ágnes Szávay	Hungary	49	7
Barbora Záhlavová-Strýcová	Czech Republic	54	8

- Seedings are based on the rankings of July 5, 2010.

=== Other entrants ===
The following players received wildcards into the singles main draw

- (Kazakhstan) Zarina Diyas
- (Czech Republic) Karolína Plíšková
- (Czech Republic) Kristýna Plíšková

The following players received entry from the qualifying draw:

- (Colombia) Catalina Castaño
- (Bosnia and Herzegovina) Mervana Jugić-Salkić
- (Russia) Ksenia Pervak
- (Romania) Liana Ungur

The following players received a lucky loser spot:

- (Czech Republic) Eva Hrdinová
- (Austria) Tamira Paszek
