= 2017 Advantage Cars Prague Open – Men's doubles =

Men's doubles
- 2017 Advantage Cars Prague Open

Final
- Champions: (Czech Republic) Jan Šátral (Austria) Tristan-Samuel Weissborn
- Runners-up: (Germany) Gero Kretschmer (Germany) Andreas Mies
- Score: 6–3, 5–7, [10–3]

Events
Singles	men	women
Doubles	men	women
- Advantage Cars Prague Open

The men's doubles of the 2017 Advantage Cars Prague Open tournament was played on clay in Prague, Czech Republic.

Julian Knowle and Igor Zelenay were the defending champions but only Zelenay chose to defend his title, partnering Andrej Martin. Zelenay lost in the first round to Christian Garin and Mariano Kestelboim.

Jan Šátral and Tristan-Samuel Weissborn won the title after defeating Gero Kretschmer and Andreas Mies 6–3, 5–7, [10–3] in the final.

== Seeds ==
1. (Germany) Gero Kretschmer / (Germany) Andreas Mies (final)
2. (Slovakia) Andrej Martin / (Slovakia) Igor Zelenay (first round)
3. (Poland) Tomasz Bednarek / (Netherlands) David Pel (first round)
4. (Turkey) Tuna Altuna / (Hungary) Gábor Borsos (first round)

== Draw ==
Key

- Q = Qualifier
- WC = Wild card
- LL = Lucky loser
- Alt = Alternate
- ITF = ITF entry
- PR = Protected ranking
- SR = Special ranking
- SE = Special exempt
- JE = Junior exempt
- JR = Junior Accelerator Programme entrant
- CO = College Accelerator Programme entrant
- NG = Next Gen Accelerator Program entrant
- w/o = Walkover
- r = Retired
- d = Defaulted

First round
1	(Germany) G Kretschmer (Germany) A Mies	7	6
WC	(Netherlands) S Groen (Czech Republic) M Vocel	5	2
(Spain) D Vega Hernández (Brazil) C Zampieri	6	7
(Uzbekistan) S Fayziev (France) M Janvier	4	5
3	(Poland) T Bednarek (Netherlands) D Pel	1	6	[5]
(Italy) A Motti (France) S Robert	6	1	[10]
WC	(Czech Republic) V Kopřiva (Czech Republic) Robin Staněk	6^{4}	6	[10]
WC	(Czech Republic) D Kellovský (Czech Republic) L Rosol	7^{7}	4	[3]
(Spain) E López-Pérez (Ukraine) D Molchanov	3	6^{5}
(Czech Republic) Z Kolář (Poland) G Panfil	6	7^{7}
(Czech Republic) Petr Michnev (Czech Republic) V Šafránek	6	6
4	(Turkey) T Altuna (Hungary) G Borsos	3	4
(Venezuela) J Muñoz Abreu (Spain) R Ojeda Lara	4	3
(Czech Republic) J Šátral (Austria) T-S Weissborn	6	6
(Chile) C Garin (Argentina) M Kestelboim	7^{7}	2	[10]
2	(Slovakia) A Martin (Slovakia) I Zelenay	6^{3}	6	[8]

Quarterfinals
1	(Germany) G Kretschmer (Germany) A Mies	6	6
(Spain) D Vega Hernández (Brazil) C Zampieri	4	4
(Italy) A Motti (France) S Robert	6	2	[3]
WC	(Czech Republic) V Kopřiva (Czech Republic) R Staněk	2	6	[10]
(Czech Republic) Z Kolář (Poland) G Panfil	6	7^{7}
(Czech Republic) P Michnev (Czech Republic) V Šafránek	3	6^{4}
(Czech Republic) J Šátral (Austria) T-S Weissborn	w/o
(Chile) C Garin (Argentina) M Kestelboim

Semifinals
1	(Germany) G Kretschmer (Germany) A Mies	6	2	[10]
WC	(Czech Republic) V Kopřiva (Czech Republic) R Staněk	4	6	[7]
(Czech Republic) Z Kolář (Poland) G Panfil	6^{5}	2
(Czech Republic) J Šátral (Austria) T-S Weissborn	7^{7}	6

Final
1	(Germany) G Kretschmer (Germany) A Mies	3	7	[3]
(Czech Republic) J Šátral (Austria) T-S Weissborn	6	5	[10]
