= 2009 ECM Prague Open =

- Date: 13–19 July
- Edition: 8th
- Draw: 32S / 16D
- Prize money: $220,000
- Surface: Clay / outdoor
- Location: Prague, Czech Republic
- Venue: I. Czech Lawn Tennis Club

Champions

Singles
- (Austria) Sybille Bammer

Doubles
- (Ukraine) Alona Bondarenko / (Ukraine) Kateryna Bondarenko
- ECM Prague Open

The 2009 ECM Prague Open was a tennis tournament played on outdoor clay courts. It was the 8th edition of the ECM Prague Open, and was part of the WTA International tournaments of the 2009 WTA Tour. It took place in Prague, Czech Republic, from 13 July through 19 July 2009.

The tournament included tennis exhibition involving Pat Cash, Mansour Bahrami and Henri Leconte.

== Finals ==
=== Singles ===
(Austria) Sybille Bammer defeated (Italy) Francesca Schiavone, 7–6^{4}, 6–2

- It was Bammers first title of the year, and the second of her career.

=== Doubles ===
(Ukraine) Alona Bondarenko / (Ukraine) Kateryna Bondarenko defeated (Czech Republic) Iveta Benešová / (Czech Republic) Barbora Záhlavová-Strýcová, 6–1, 6–2

== WTA entrants ==
=== Seeds ===
Player	Nationality	Ranking*	Seeding
Francesca Schiavone	Italy	28	1
Sybille Bammer	Austria	30	2
Iveta Benešová	Czech Republic	31	3
Carla Suárez Navarro	(Spain)	32	4
Alona Bondarenko	Ukraine	36	5
Magdaléna Rybáriková	Slovakia	46	6
Lucie Hradecká	Czech Republic	56	7
Petra Kvitová	Czech Republic	58	8

- Seedings are based on the rankings of July 6, 2009.

=== Other entrants ===
The following players received wildcards into the singles main draw

- (Slovakia) Kristína Kučová
- (Kazakhstan) Zarina Diyas
- (Czech Republic) Karolína Plíšková

The following players received entry from the qualifying draw:

- (Switzerland) Timea Bacsinszky
- (France) Kristina Mladenovic
- (Russia) Ksenia Pervak
- (Croatia) Petra Martić
