= 2014 Advantage Cars Prague Open – Doubles =

Doubles
- 2014 Advantage Cars Prague Open

Final
- Champions: (Croatia) Toni Androić (Russia) Andrey Kuznetsov
- Runners-up: (Venezuela) Roberto Maytín (Mexico) Miguel Ángel Reyes-Varela
- Score: 7–5, 7–5

Events
Singles	Doubles
- Advantage Cars Prague Open

The men's doubles of the 2014 Advantage Cars Prague Open tournament was played on clay in Prague, Czech Republic.

The 2014 Advantage Cars Prague Open doubles was a professional tennis tournament played on clay courts in Prague, Czech Republic. Toni Androić and Andrey Kuznetsov were crowned champions, after defeating Roberto Maytín and Miguel Ángel Reyes-Varela 7–5, 7–5

== Seeds ==
1. (Australia) Rameez Junaid / (Slovakia) Michal Mertiňák (semifinals)
2. (Czech Republic) Lukáš Dlouhý / (Poland) Mateusz Kowalczyk (semifinals)
3. (Germany) Martin Emmrich / (Germany) Gero Kretschmer (quarterfinals)
4. (Czech Republic) František Čermák / (Germany) Dominik Meffert (first round)

== Draw ==
Key

- Q = Qualifier
- WC = Wild card
- LL = Lucky loser
- Alt = Alternate
- ITF = ITF entry
- PR = Protected ranking
- SR = Special ranking
- SE = Special exempt
- JE = Junior exempt
- JR = Junior Accelerator Programme entrant
- CO = College Accelerator Programme entrant
- NG = Next Gen Accelerator Program entrant
- w/o = Walkover
- r = Retired
- d = Defaulted

=== Draw ===
First round
1	(Australia) R Junaid (Slovakia) M Mertiňák	6	6
WC	(Czech Republic) D Lojda (Slovakia) Adrian Sikora	1	2
(Germany) P Marx (Sweden) A Siljeström	4	5
(Czech Republic) R Jebavý (Czech Republic) J Pospíšil	6	7
4	(Czech Republic) F Čermák (Germany) D Meffert	4	6	[7]
(Poland) T Bednarek (Slovakia) I Zelenay	6	3	[10]
(Republic of Ireland) J Cluskey (United Kingdom) S Thornley	3	6	[1]
(Venezuela) R Maytín (Mexico) MÁ Reyes-Varela	6	2	[10]
(Australia) R Agar (Australia) A Bolt	7^{7}	6
(Croatia) T Androić (Russia) A Kuznetsov	6^{3}	3
WC	(Czech Republic) Marek Routa (Czech Republic) David Simunek	1	0
3	(Germany) M Emmrich (Germany) G Kretschmer	6	6
(Argentina) A Molteni (Argentina) D Schwartzman	6	6
(China) G Maoxin (Chinese Taipei) H-y Peng	3	2
WC	(Czech Republic) J Mertl (Czech Republic) Robin Stanek	4	6	[9]
2	(Czech Republic) L Dlouhý (Poland) M Kowalczyk	6	4	[11]

Quarterfinals
1	(Australia) R Junaid (Slovakia) M Mertiňák	7	6
(Czech Republic) R Jebavý (Czech Republic) J Pospíšil	5	3
(Poland) T Bednarek (Slovakia) I Zelenay	6^{3}	6	[8]
(Venezuela) R Maytín (Mexico) MÁ Reyes-Varela	7^{7}	4	[10]
(Croatia) T Androić (Russia) A Kuznetsov	6	6
3	(Germany) M Emmrich (Germany) G Kretschmer	1	4
(Argentina) A Molteni (Argentina) D Schwartzman	3	4
2	(Czech Republic) L Dlouhý (Poland) M Kowalczyk	6	6

Semifinals
1	(Australia) R Junaid (Slovakia) M Mertiňák	4	6^{9}
(Venezuela) R Maytín (Mexico) MÁ Reyes-Varela	6	7^{11}
(Croatia) T Androić (Russia) A Kuznetsov	6	7^{7}
2	(Czech Republic) L Dlouhý (Poland) M Kowalczyk	3	6^{5}

Final
(Venezuela) R Maytín (Mexico) MÁ Reyes-Varela	5	5
(Croatia) T Androić (Russia) A Kuznetsov	7	7
