= 1997 Skoda Czech Open =

- Date: 14–20 July
- Edition: 6th
- Category: Tier IV
- Draw: 32S / 16D
- Prize money: $160,000
- Surface: Clay / outdoor
- Location: Prague, Czech Republic
- Venue: I. Czech Lawn Tennis Club

Champions

Singles
- (South Africa) Joannette Kruger

Doubles
- (Romania) Ruxandra Dragomir / (Slovakia) Karina Habšudová
- ATP Prague Open

The 1997 Skoda Czech Open was a women's tennis tournament played on outdoor clay courts at the I. Czech Lawn Tennis Club in Prague in the Czech Republic that was part of the Tier IV category of the 1997 WTA Tour. It was the sixth edition of the tournament and was held from 14 July through 20 July 1997. Unseeded Joannette Kruger won the singles title.

== Finals ==
=== Singles ===
(South Africa) Joannette Kruger defeated (Austria) Marion Maruska 6–1, 6–1

- It was Kruger's only singles title of the year and the 2nd and last of her career.

=== Doubles ===
(Romania) Ruxandra Dragomir / (Slovakia) Karina Habšudová defeated (Czech Republic) Eva Martincová / (Czech Republic) Helena Vildová 6–1, 5–7, 6–2

- It was Dragomir's 2nd title of the year and the 7th of her career. It was Habšudová's only title of the year and the 2nd of her career.
