= 2011 Strabag Prague Open – Men's doubles =

Men's doubles
- 2011 Strabag Prague Open

Final
- Champions: (Czech Republic) František Čermák (Czech Republic) Lukáš Rosol
- Runners-up: (Germany) Christopher Kas (Austria) Alexander Peya
- Score: 6–3, 6–4

Events
Singles	men	women
Doubles	men	women
← 2008 ·	Strabag Prague Open	· 2012 →

The men's doubles of the 2011 Strabag Prague Open tournament was played on clay in Prague, Czech Republic.

Lukáš Dlouhý and Petr Pála were the defending champions from the last edition in 2008, but decided not to participate.
František Čermák and Lukáš Rosol won the title after defeating Christopher Kas and Alexander Peya 6–3, 6–4 in the final.

== Seeds ==
1. (Brazil) Franco Ferreiro / (Brazil) André Sá (first round)
2. (Germany) Christopher Kas / (Austria) Alexander Peya (final)
3. (Czech Republic) Leoš Friedl / (Slovakia) Filip Polášek (first round)
4. (Germany) Michael Kohlmann / (Slovakia) Igor Zelenay (first round)

== Draw ==
=== Key ===
- Q = Qualifier
- WC = Wild card
- LL = Lucky loser
- Alt = Alternate
- SE = Special exempt
- PR = Protected ranking
- ITF = ITF entry
- JE = Junior exempt
- w/o = Walkover
- r = Retired
- d = Defaulted
- SR = Special ranking

=== Draw ===
First round
1	(Brazil) F Ferreiro (Brazil) A Sá	6^{6}	2
WC	(Czech Republic) D Lojda (Czech Republic) J Veselý	7	6
(Czech Republic) F Čermák (Czech Republic) L Rosol	6	6^{4}	[10]
(Germany) F Moser (Czech Republic) D Škoch	2	7	[5]
3	(Czech Republic) L Friedl (Slovakia) F Polášek	6^{4}	3
(Germany) D Gremelmayr (Netherlands) J Huta Galung	7	6
(United States) B Battistone (Philippines) TC Huey	4	4
(Argentina) L Arnold Ker (Argentina) H Zeballos	6	6
(Australia) R Junaid (Germany) P Marx	3	3
WC	(Czech Republic) J Hernych (Czech Republic) I Minář	6	6
WC	(Czech Republic) Jan Blech (Spain) P Clar-Rosselló	7	3	[10]
4	(Germany) M Kohlmann (Slovakia) I Zelenay	5	6	[2]
(United Kingdom) J Delgado (United Kingdom) J Marray	7	6
(Germany) D Brands (Netherlands) R Wassen	6^{3}	4
(France) J Chardy (France) S Robert	6^{6}	7	[9]
2	(Germany) C Kas (Austria) A Peya	7	6^{1}	[11]

Quarterfinals
WC	(Czech Republic) D Lojda (Czech Republic) J Veselý	6^{5}	4
(Czech Republic) F Čermák (Czech Republic) L Rosol	7	6
(Germany) D Gremelmayr (Netherlands) J Huta Galung	6	4	[8]
(Argentina) L Arnold Ker (Argentina) H Zeballos	3	6	[10]
WC	(Czech Republic) J Hernych (Czech Republic) I Minář
WC	(Czech Republic) Jan Blech (Spain) P Clar-Rosselló	w/o
(United Kingdom) J Delgado (United Kingdom) J Marray	3	3
2	(Germany) C Kas (Austria) A Peya	6	6

Semifinals
(Czech Republic) F Čermák (Czech Republic) L Rosol	6	2	[10]
(Argentina) L Arnold Ker (Argentina) H Zeballos	4	6	[8]
WC	(Czech Republic) J Hernych (Czech Republic) I Minář	2	3
2	(Germany) C Kas (Austria) A Peya	6	6

Final
(Czech Republic) F Čermák (Czech Republic) L Rosol	6	6
2	(Germany) C Kas (Austria) A Peya	3	4
