= 2021 I.ČLTK Prague Open – Men's doubles =

Men's doubles
- 2021 I.ČLTK Prague Open

Final
- Champions: (Australia) Marc Polmans (Ukraine) Sergiy Stakhovsky
- Runners-up: (Croatia) Ivan Sabanov (Croatia) Matej Sabanov
- Score: 6–3, 6–4

Events
Singles	men	women
Doubles	men	women
- I.ČLTK Prague Open

The men's doubles of the 2021 I.ČLTK Prague Open tournament was played on clay in Prague, Czech Republic.

Pierre-Hugues Herbert and Arthur Rinderknech were the defending champions but chose not to compete this year.

Marc Polmans and Sergiy Stakhovsky won the title after defeating Ivan and Matej Sabanov 6–3, 6–4 in the final.

== Seeds ==
1. (Ukraine) Denys Molchanov / (Kazakhstan) Aleksandr Nedovyesov (quarterfinals)
2. (Venezuela) Luis David Martínez / (Spain) David Vega Hernández (quarterfinals)
3. (Croatia) Ivan Sabanov / (Croatia) Matej Sabanov (final)
4. (Germany) Andre Begemann / (Germany) Daniel Masur (first round)

== Draw ==
Key

- Q = Qualifier
- WC = Wild card
- LL = Lucky loser
- Alt = Alternate
- ITF = ITF entry
- PR = Protected ranking
- SR = Special ranking
- SE = Special exempt
- JE = Junior exempt
- JR = Junior Accelerator Programme entrant
- CO = College Accelerator Programme entrant
- NG = Next Gen Accelerator Program entrant
- w/o = Walkover
- r = Retired
- d = Defaulted

First round
1	(Ukraine) D Molchanov (Kazakhstan) A Nedovyesov	6	6
(Netherlands) T Griekspoor (Germany) O Otte	4	4
(Uzbekistan) D Istomin (Belarus) A Vasilevski	4	6	[7]
(Australia) M Polmans (Ukraine) S Stakhovsky	6	2	[10]
4	(Germany) A Begemann (Germany) D Masur	6	3	[2]
(Czech Republic) R Jebavý (Slovakia) A Martin	3	6	[10]
WC	(Czech Republic) J Šátral (Czech Republic) Robin Staněk	7^{7}	3	[8]
(United States) D Kudla (United States) M Schnur	6^{4}	6	[10]
WC	(Czech Republic) J Lehečka (Czech Republic) M Vrbenský	4	1
(United States) E King (United States) H Reese	6	6
(Poland) S Walków (Poland) J Zieliński	6	3	[5]
3	(Croatia) I Sabanov (Croatia) M Sabanov	3	6	[10]
(Egypt) M Safwat (Austria) T-S Weissborn	4	1
(Poland) K Drzewiecki (Poland) K Majchrzak	6	6
WC	(Czech Republic) A Paulson (Czech Republic) P Rikl	7	3	[5]
2	(Venezuela) LD Martínez (Spain) D Vega Hernández	5	6	[10]

Quarterfinals
1	(Ukraine) D Molchanov (Kazakhstan) A Nedovyesov	6	1	[7]
(Australia) M Polmans (Ukraine) S Stakhovsky	3	6	[10]
(Czech Republic) R Jebavý (Slovakia) A Martin	4	4
(United States) D Kudla (United States) M Schnur	6	6
(United States) E King (United States) H Reese	6^{4}	5
3	(Croatia) I Sabanov (Croatia) M Sabanov	7^{7}	7
(Poland) K Drzewiecki (Poland) K Majchrzak	6	7^{7}
2	(Venezuela) LD Martínez (Spain) D Vega Hernández	4	6^{5}

Semifinals
(Australia) M Polmans (Ukraine) S Stakhovsky	6	6
(United States) D Kudla (United States) M Schnur	1	2
3	(Croatia) I Sabanov (Croatia) M Sabanov	6	6
(Poland) K Drzewiecki (Poland) K Majchrzak	2	2

Final
(Australia) M Polmans (Ukraine) S Stakhovsky	6	6
3	(Croatia) I Sabanov (Croatia) M Sabanov	3	4
