= 2012 CNGvitall Prague Open – Doubles =

Doubles
- 2012 CNGvitall Prague Open

Final
- Champions: (Czech Republic) Lukáš Rosol (Argentina) Horacio Zeballos
- Runners-up: (Slovakia) Martin Kližan (Slovakia) Igor Zelenay
- Score: 7–5, 2–6, [12–10]

Details
- Draw: 16
- Seeds: 4

Events
Singles	Doubles
← 2011 ·	CNGvitall Prague Open	· 2013 →

The men's doubles of the 2012 CNGvitall Prague Open tournament was played on clay in Prague, Czech Republic.

František Čermák and Lukáš Rosol were the defending champions but Čermák decided not to participate.
Rosol played alongside Horacio Zeballos and won the title by defeating Martin Kližan and Igor Zelenay 7–5, 2–6, [12–10] in the final.

== Seeds ==
1. (Austria) Julian Knowle / (Slovakia) Michal Mertiňák (first round)
2. (Germany) Martin Emmrich / (Sweden) Andreas Siljeström (quarterfinals)
3. (Sweden) Johan Brunström / (Germany) Philipp Marx (first round)
4. (Colombia) Robert Farah / (Croatia) Lovro Zovko (first round)

== Draw ==
=== Key ===
- Q = Qualifier
- WC = Wild card
- LL = Lucky loser
- Alt = Alternate
- SE = Special exempt
- PR = Protected ranking
- ITF = ITF entry
- JE = Junior exempt
- w/o = Walkover
- r = Retired
- d = Defaulted
- SR = Special ranking

=== Draw ===
First round
1	(Austria) J Knowle (Slovakia) M Mertiňák	6	3	[6]
(Poland) T Bednarek (France) O Charroin	3	6	[10]
WC	(Czech Republic) Jan Blecha (Canada) É Chvojka	6	6
Q	(Czech Republic) Marek Michalička (Czech Republic) J Minář	4	1
3	(Sweden) J Brunström (Germany) P Marx	6^{0}	6^{8}
(Slovakia) M Kližan (Slovakia) I Zelenay	7^{7}	7^{10}
(Czech Republic) D Lojda (Israel) D Sela	2	2
WC	(Czech Republic) J Hájek (Czech Republic) J Veselý	6	6
(Czech Republic) J Mertl (Czech Republic) J Pospíšil	7^{7}	2	[10]
(Slovenia) A Bedene (Slovenia) G Žemlja	6^{4}	6	[3]
(Germany) D Brands (Austria) M Fischer	2	7^{9}	[10]
4	(Colombia) R Farah (Croatia) L Zovko	6	6^{7}	[6]
WC	(Poland) M Kowalczyk (Czech Republic) D Škoch	6^{2}	4
(Czech Republic) L Rosol (Argentina) H Zeballos	7^{7}	6
(Russia) T Gabashvili (Kazakhstan) A Golubev	2	6	[8]
2	(Germany) M Emmrich (Sweden) A Siljeström	6	4	[10]

Quarterfinals
(Poland) T Bednarek (France) O Charroin	6	6
WC	(Czech Republic) Jan Blecha (Canada) É Chvojka	2	4
(Slovakia) M Kližan (Slovakia) I Zelenay	6	6
WC	(Czech Republic) J Hájek (Czech Republic) J Veselý	0	3
(Czech Republic) J Mertl (Czech Republic) J Pospíšil
(Germany) D Brands (Austria) M Fischer	w/o
(Czech Republic) L Rosol (Argentina) H Zeballos	7^{7}	7
2	(Germany) M Emmrich (Sweden) A Siljeström	6^{4}	5

Semifinals
(Poland) T Bednarek (France) O Charroin	7	0	[5]
(Slovakia) M Kližan (Slovakia) I Zelenay	5	6	[10]
(Czech Republic) J Mertl (Czech Republic) J Pospíšil	0	6^{5}
(Czech Republic) L Rosol (Argentina) H Zeballos	6	7^{7}

Final
(Slovakia) M Kližan (Slovakia) I Zelenay	5	6	[10]
(Czech Republic) L Rosol (Argentina) H Zeballos	7	2	[12]
