= 2011 Strabag Prague Open – Men's singles =

Men's singles
- 2011 Strabag Prague Open

Final
- Champion: (Czech Republic) Lukáš Rosol
- Runner-up: (United States) Alex Bogomolov Jr.
- Score: 7–6(1), 5–2 retired

Events
Singles	men	women
Doubles	men	women
← 2008 ·	Strabag Prague Open	· 2012 →

The men's singles of the 2011 Strabag Prague Open tournament was played on clay in Prague, Czech Republic.

The 2011 Strabag Prague Open Open was a men's tennis tournament played on clay in Prague, Czech Republic.

Jan Hernych was the last edition's champion, but lost to Alexander Bury in the qualifying tournament.
Lukáš Rosol defeated Alex Bogomolov Jr. in the final 7–6(1), 5–2 before Bogomolov retired.

== Seeds ==
1. (France) Jérémy Chardy (second round)
2. (Bulgaria) Grigor Dimitrov (second round)
3. (France) Julien Benneteau (quarterfinals)
4. (Germany) Matthias Bachinger (second round)
5. (Czech Republic) Jan Hájek (quarterfinals, withdrew)
6. (France) Florent Serra (second round)
7. (Portugal) Rui Machado (second round)
8. (United States) Alex Bogomolov Jr. (final, retired)

== Draw ==
=== Key ===
- Q = Qualifier
- WC = Wild card
- LL = Lucky loser
- Alt = Alternate
- SE = Special exempt
- PR = Protected ranking
- ITF = ITF entry
- JE = Junior exempt
- w/o = Walkover
- r = Retired
- d = Defaulted
- SR = Special ranking

=== Finals ===
Semifinals
WC	(Chile) Fernando González	6	0^{r}
(Czech Republic) Lukáš Rosol	3	4
(Czech Republic) Ivo Minář	6^{3}	4
8	(United States) Alex Bogomolov Jr.	7	6

Final
(Czech Republic) Lukáš Rosol	7	5
8	(United States) Alex Bogomolov Jr.	6^{1}	2^{r}

=== Top half ===
First round
1	(France) J Chardy	6	6
Q	(Belarus) A Bury	1	2
(Czech Republic) J Pospíšil	4	2
WC	(Chile) F González	6	6
WC	(Czech Republic) Jan Blecha	1	2
(Slovakia) L Lacko	6	6
(Germany) D Brands	3	2
6	(France) F Serra	6	6
3	(France) J Benneteau	7	6^{7}	6
(France) V Millot	5	7	3
Q	(Australia) J Lemke	0	2
(Germany) D Gremelmayr	6	6
(Czech Republic) L Rosol	6	6
(Poland) J Janowicz	4	4
Q	(France) N Devilder	6	3	2
7	(Portugal) R Machado	4	6	6

Second round
1	(France) J Chardy	3	4
WC	(Chile) F González	6	6
(Slovakia) L Lacko	6	6
6	(France) F Serra	4	2
3	(France) J Benneteau	3	6	6
(Germany) D Gremelmayr	6	4	3
(Czech Republic) L Rosol	6^{5}	6	7
7	(Portugal) R Machado	7	1	6^{8}

Quarterfinals
WC	(Chile) F González	6	6
(Slovakia) L Lacko	4	4
3	(France) J Benneteau	6	2	4
(Czech Republic) L Rosol	3	6	6

Semifinals
WC	(Chile) F González	6	0^{r}
(Czech Republic) L Rosol	3	4

=== Bottom half ===
First round
5	(Czech Republic) J Hájek	7	6
WC	(Brazil) T Fernandes	6^{7}	3
(Russia) A Kudryavtsev	2	4
(Argentina) H Zeballos	6	6
(Kazakhstan) Y Schukin	4	3
(Czech Republic) I Minář	6	6
WC	(Czech Republic) J Veselý	2	5
4	(Germany) M Bachinger	6	7
8	(United States) A Bogomolov Jr.	6	6
SE	(Hungary) Á Kellner	2	4
(Brazil) R Dutra da Silva	4	5
(Netherlands) J Huta Galung	6	7
Q	(Germany) Dennis Blömke	6^{9}	6	6
(Belarus) U Ignatik	7	2	2
SE	(France) S Robert	1	6	3
2	(Bulgaria) G Dimitrov	6	3	6

Second round
5	(Czech Republic) J Hájek	4	6	6
(Argentina) H Zeballos	6	1	2
(Czech Republic) I Minář	6	6
4	(Germany) M Bachinger	4	3
8	(United States) A Bogomolov Jr.	6^{4}	6	6
(Netherlands) J Huta Galung	7	4	3
Q	(Germany) Dennis Blömke	1	6	6
2	(Bulgaria) G Dimitrov	6	3	0

Quarterfinals
5	(Czech Republic) J Hájek
(Czech Republic) I Minář	w/o
8	(United States) A Bogomolov Jr.	6	4	6
Q	(Germany) Dennis Blömke	3	6	4

Semifinals
(Czech Republic) I Minář	6^{3}	4
8	(United States) A Bogomolov Jr.	7	6
