= 2017 Advantage Cars Prague Open – Men's singles =

Men's singles
- 2017 Advantage Cars Prague Open

Final
- Champion: (Slovakia) Andrej Martin
- Runner-up: (Germany) Yannick Maden
- Score: 7–6^{(7–3)}, 6–3

Events
| Singles | men | women |
| Doubles | men | women |
- Advantage Cars Prague Open

The men's singles of the 2017 Advantage Cars Prague Open tournament was played on clay in Prague, Czech Republic.

Santiago Giraldo was the defending champion but chose not to defend his title.

Andrej Martin won the title after defeating Yannick Maden 7–6^{(7–3)}, 6–3 in the final.

== Seeds ==
1. (Czech Republic) Adam Pavlásek (semifinals)
2. (Belarus) Uladzimir Ignatik (first round)
3. (Serbia) Filip Krajinović (withdrew)
4. (Slovakia) Andrej Martin (champion)
5. (Slovakia) Jozef Kovalík (first round)
6. (Czech Republic) Lukáš Rosol (first round)
7. (Germany) Tobias Kamke (quarterfinals)
8. (Czech Republic) Jan Šátral (first round)
9. (Portugal) João Domingues (semifinals)

== Draw ==
Key

- Q = Qualifier
- WC = Wild card
- LL = Lucky loser
- Alt = Alternate
- ITF = ITF entry
- PR = Protected ranking
- SR = Special ranking
- SE = Special exempt
- JE = Junior exempt
- JR = Junior Accelerator Programme entrant
- CO = College Accelerator Programme entrant
- NG = Next Gen Accelerator Program entrant
- w/o = Walkover
- r = Retired
- d = Defaulted

=== Finals ===
Semifinals
1 | (Czech Republic) Adam Pavlásek | 1 | 6^{6}
4 | (Slovakia) Andrej Martin | 6 | 7^{8}
9 | (Portugal) João Domingues | 0 | 4
(Germany) Yannick Maden | 6 | 6

Final
4 | (Slovakia) Andrej Martin | 7^{7} | 6
(Germany) Yannick Maden | 6^{3} | 3

=== Top half ===
First round
1 | (Czech Republic) A Pavlásek | 6 | 6
(Turkey) M İlhan | 2 | 1
Alt | (Czech Republic) Marek Jaloviec | 6 | 6
WC | (Czech Republic) Marek Podlešák | 1 | 0
WC | (Czech Republic) Robin Staněk | 6 | 3 | 3
Q | (Austria) Lenny Hampel | 4 | 6 | 6
(Czech Republic) Z Kolář | 2 | 6 | 6
5 | (Slovakia) J Kovalík | 6 | 3 | 4
4 | (Slovakia) A Martin | 6 | 6^{4} | 7^{8}
(Kazakhstan) A Nedovyesov | 4 | 7^{7} | 6^{6}
(Chile) C Garin | 6^{2} | 0^{r}
(Germany) Jeremy Jahn | 7^{7} | 4
(Czech Republic) V Šafránek | 6 | 3 | 5
Q | (Argentina) Juan Ignacio Galarza | 2 | 6 | 7
Q | (France) M Chazal | 3 | 3
7 | (Germany) T Kamke | 6 | 6

Second round
1 | (Czech Republic) A Pavlásek | 6 | 6
Alt | (Czech Republic) M Jaloviec | 2 | 2
Q | (Austria) L Hampel | 6^{6} | 0
(Czech Republic) Z Kolář | 7^{8} | 6
4 | (Slovakia) A Martin | 7 | 2 | 6
(Germany) J Jahn | 5 | 6 | 4
Q | (Argentina) JI Galarza | 0 | 3
7 | (Germany) T Kamke | 6 | 6

Quarterfinals
1 | (Czech Republic) A Pavlásek | 6 | 7^{7}
(Czech Republic) Z Kolář | 2 | 6^{5}
4 | (Slovakia) A Martin | 6 | 2 | 6
7 | (Germany) T Kamke | 3 | 6 | 1

Semifinals
1 | (Czech Republic) A Pavlásek | 1 | 6^{6}
4 | (Slovakia) A Martin | 6 | 7^{8}

=== Bottom half ===
First round
8 | (Czech Republic) J Šátral | 6 | 5 | 5
Q | (Austria) J Rodionov | 1 | 7 | 7
(France) M Janvier | 1 | 6 | 4
(Spain) E López-Pérez | 6 | 3 | 6
SE | (Serbia) M Tepavac | 5 | 6 | 4
WC | (Czech Republic) D Kellovský | 7 | 3 | 6
WC | (Czech Republic) V Kopřiva | 3 | 6^{14}
9 | (Portugal) J Domingues | 6 | 7^{16}
6 | (Czech Republic) L Rosol | 5 | 5
(Germany) Y Maden | 7 | 7
(Czech Republic) Petr Michnev | 3 | 0
(France) S Robert | 6 | 6
LL | (Russia) R Safiullin | 7 | 7^{9}
(Uzbekistan) S Fayziev | 5 | 6^{7}
(Spain) R Ojeda Lara | 6 | 7^{7}
2 | (Belarus) U Ignatik | 2 | 6^{4}

Second round
Q | (Austria) J Rodionov | 6 | 6
(Spain) E López-Pérez | 4 | 3
WC | (Czech Republic) D Kellovský | 2 | 2
9 | (Portugal) J Domingues | 6 | 6
(Germany) Y Maden | 3 | 7^{7} | 6
(France) S Robert | 6 | 6^{5} | 2
LL | (Russia) R Safiullin | 6 | 6
(Spain) R Ojeda Lara | 3 | 4

Quarterfinals
Q | (Austria) J Rodionov | 4 | 2
9 | (Portugal) J Domingues | 6 | 6
(Germany) Y Maden | 6 | 2 | 6
LL | (Russia) R Safiullin | 4 | 6 | 4

Semifinals
9 | (Portugal) J Domingues | 0 | 4
(Germany) Y Maden | 6 | 6
