= 2012 CNGvitall Prague Open – Singles =

Singles
- 2012 CNGvitall Prague Open

Final
- Champion: (Argentina) Horacio Zeballos
- Runner-up: (Slovakia) Martin Kližan
- Score: 1–6, 6–4, 7–6^{(8–6)}

Events
Singles	Doubles
← 2011 ·	CNGvitall Prague Open	· 2013 →

The men's singles of the 2012 CNGvitall Prague Open tournament was played on clay in Prague, Czech Republic.

Lukáš Rosol was the defending champion but lost in the quarterfinals.
Horacio Zeballos won the title 1–6, 6–4, 7–6^{(8–6)} in the final against Martin Kližan.

== Seeds ==
1. (Israel) Dudi Sela (second round)
2. (Slovakia) Lukáš Lacko (first round)
3. (Czech Republic) Lukáš Rosol (quarterfinals)
4. (Germany) Tobias Kamke (semifinals)
5. (Bulgaria) Grigor Dimitrov (second round)
6. (Slovakia) Martin Kližan (final)
7. (Germany) Matthias Bachinger (quarterfinals)
8. (Germany) Daniel Brands (first round)

== Draw ==
=== Key ===
- Q = Qualifier
- WC = Wild card
- LL = Lucky loser
- Alt = Alternate
- SE = Special exempt
- PR = Protected ranking
- ITF = ITF entry
- JE = Junior exempt
- w/o = Walkover
- r = Retired
- d = Defaulted
- SR = Special ranking

=== Finals ===
Semifinals
(Argentina) Horacio Zeballos	6^{1}	7	6
4	(Germany) Tobias Kamke	7^{7}	5	2
(Slovenia) Aljaž Bedene	7	3	2
6	(Slovakia) Martin Kližan	5	6	6

Final
(Argentina) Horacio Zeballos	1	6	7^{8}
6	(Slovakia) Martin Kližan	6	4	6^{6}

=== Top half ===
First round
1	(Israel) D Sela	7	6
WC	(Czech Republic) Jan Blecha	6^{2}	3
(Turkey) M İlhan	4	4
(Argentina) H Zeballos	6	6
(United States) M Yani	4	6	3
Q	(Austria) M Fischer	6	2	6
WC	(Czech Republic) J Veselý	1	2
7	(Germany) M Bachinger	6	6
4	(Germany) T Kamke	6	6
(France) S Robert	4	2
Q	(Slovakia) M Mečíř Jr.	6^{5}	4
(Slovenia) G Žemlja	7^{7}	6
WC	(Croatia) M Pavić	6	6
LL	(France) Axel Michon	4	4
Q	(Germany) D Meffert	7^{8}	6
8	(Germany) D Brands	6^{6}	4

Second round
1	(Israel) D Sela	4	3
(Argentina) H Zeballos	6	6
Q	(Austria) M Fischer	1	0^{r}
7	(Germany) M Bachinger	6	1
4	(Germany) T Kamke	4	6	7^{7}
(Slovenia) G Žemlja	6	3	6^{2}
WC	(Croatia) M Pavić	6^{5}	1
Q	(Germany) D Meffert	7^{7}	6

Quarterfinals
(Argentina) H Zeballos	6^{5}	6	6
7	(Germany) M Bachinger	7^{7}	3	4
4	(Germany) T Kamke	6	6
Q	(Germany) D Meffert	4	4

Semifinals
(Argentina) H Zeballos	6^{1}	7	6
4	(Germany) T Kamke	7^{7}	5	2

=== Bottom half ===
First round
5	(Bulgaria) G Dimitrov	6	7
(Czech Republic) J Hájek	3	5
(United States) M Russell	2	6^{4}
(Slovenia) A Bedene	6	7^{7}
SE	(Italy) M Marrai	6	0	6^{5}
(Belgium) D Goffin	3	6	7^{7}
(Austria) A Haider-Maurer	1^{r}
3	(Czech Republic) L Rosol	6
6	(Slovakia) M Kližan	7^{7}	6
(Netherlands) T Schoorel	6^{1}	3
(Kazakhstan) A Golubev	2	2
SE	(Czech Republic) D Lojda	6	6
Q	(Germany) K Krawietz	6	4	6
(Czech Republic) J Mertl	4	6	2
(Russia) T Gabashvili	6	6
2	(Slovakia) L Lacko	4	4

Second round
5	(Bulgaria) G Dimitrov	6	5	2
(Slovenia) A Bedene	3	7	6
(Belgium) D Goffin	3	6	3
3	(Czech Republic) L Rosol	6	3	6
6	(Slovakia) M Kližan	6	6
SE	(Czech Republic) D Lojda	0	1
Q	(Germany) K Krawietz	7^{7}	3	6
(Russia) T Gabashvili	6^{3}	6	3

Quarterfinals
(Slovenia) A Bedene	3	6	6
3	(Czech Republic) L Rosol	6	4	1
6	(Slovakia) M Kližan	6	6
Q	(Germany) K Krawietz	4	2

Semifinals
(Slovenia) A Bedene	7	3	2
6	(Slovakia) M Kližan	5	6	6
