= 2014 Advantage Cars Prague Open – Singles =

Singles
- 2014 Advantage Cars Prague Open

Final
- Champion: (Argentina) Diego Schwartzman
- Runner-up: (Brazil) André Ghem
- Score: 6–4, 7–5

Events
Singles	Doubles
- Advantage Cars Prague Open

The men's singles of the 2014 Advantage Cars Prague Open tournament was played on clay in Prague, Czech Republic.

The 2014 Advantage Cars Prague Open singles was a professional tennis tournament played on clay courts. Diego Schwartzman won the tournament, defeating André Ghem 6–4, 7–5

== Seeds ==
1. (Argentina) Diego Sebastián Schwartzman (champion)
2. (Russia) Andrey Kuznetsov (first round)
3. (Poland) Michał Przysiężny (quarterfinals)
4. (Austria) Gerald Melzer (second round)
5. (France) Grégoire Burquier (first round)
6. (Slovakia) Miloslav Mečíř Jr. (withdrew due to hip injury)
7. (Russia) Valery Rudnev (second round)
8. (Republic of Ireland) Louk Sorensen (second round)

== Draw ==
Key

- Q = Qualifier
- WC = Wild card
- LL = Lucky loser
- Alt = Alternate
- ITF = ITF entry
- PR = Protected ranking
- SR = Special ranking
- SE = Special exempt
- JE = Junior exempt
- JR = Junior Accelerator Programme entrant
- CO = College Accelerator Programme entrant
- NG = Next Gen Accelerator Program entrant
- w/o = Walkover
- r = Retired
- d = Defaulted

=== Finals ===
Semifinals
1	(Argentina) Diego Schwartzman	5	6	7^{7}
(Czech Republic) Jaroslav Pospíšil	7	2	6^{5}
(Brazil) André Ghem	6	6
(Spain) Rubén Ramírez Hidalgo	4	2

Final
1	(Argentina) Diego Schwartzman	6	7
(Brazil) André Ghem	4	5

=== Top half ===
First round
1	(Argentina) D Schwartzman	4	6	6
(Croatia) T Androić	6	2	2
(Belgium) N Desein	1	1^{r}
(Netherlands) B Westerhof	6	3
(Belarus) U Ignatik	6	6
WC	(Czech Republic) David Simunek	4	4
(Czech Republic) J Hernych	2	6	1
8	(Republic of Ireland) L Sorensen	6	4	6
3	(Poland) M Przysiężny	3	6	6
WC	(Slovakia) Adrian Sikora	6	3	3
SE	(Chinese Taipei) T-h Yang	2	2
(Czech Republic) J Hájek	6	6
LL	(France) L Lokoli	3	3
(Czech Republic) J Pospíšil	6	6
Alt	(Australia) A Bolt	6	6
5	(France) G Burquier	1	2

Second round
1	(Argentina) D Schwartzman	6	6
(Netherlands) B Westerhof	1	0
(Belarus) U Ignatik	6	6
8	(Republic of Ireland) L Sorensen	0	2
3	(Poland) M Przysiężny	6	6
(Czech Republic) J Hájek	4	4
(Czech Republic) J Pospíšil	2	6	6
Alt	(Australia) A Bolt	6	3	3

Quarterfinals
1	(Argentina) D Schwartzman	7^{7}	6
(Belarus) U Ignatik	6^{4}	2
3	(Poland) M Przysiężny	2	7^{7}	3
(Czech Republic) J Pospíšil	6	6^{5}	6

Semifinals
1	(Argentina) D Schwartzman	5	6	7^{7}
(Czech Republic) J Pospíšil	7	2	6^{5}

=== Bottom half ===
First round
LL	(United States) G Ouellette	4	6	3
(Czech Republic) J Mertl	6	3	6
Q	(Slovakia) J Kovalík	6	5	3
Q	(Serbia) M Janković	1	7	6
(Spain) G Granollers	6^{5}	4
(Brazil) A Ghem	7	6
WC	(Czech Republic) Robin Stanek	2	6	4
4	(Austria) G Melzer	6	2	6
7	(Russia) V Rudnev	4	7	6
(Spain) R Carballés Baena	6	5	2
(Spain) R Ramírez Hidalgo	6	6
Q	(Czech Republic) Tomáš Papík	1	1
(Spain) J Samper Montaña	6	6
WC	(Czech Republic) D Lojda	3	1
Q	(Brazil) T Monteiro	6	6
2	(Russia) A Kuznetsov	3	4

Second round
(Czech Republic) J Mertl	4	4
Q	(Serbia) M Janković	6	6
(Brazil) A Ghem	3	6	6
4	(Austria) G Melzer	6	3	2
7	(Russia) V Rudnev	1	0
(Spain) R Ramírez Hidalgo	6	6
(Spain) J Samper Montaña	7^{7}	6
Q	(Brazil) T Monteiro	6^{6}	0

Quarterfinals
Q	(Serbia) M Janković	2	4
(Brazil) A Ghem	6	6
(Spain) R Ramírez Hidalgo	6	6
(Spain) J Samper Montaña	4	0

Semifinals
(Brazil) A Ghem	6	6
(Spain) R Ramírez Hidalgo	4	2
