= 2021 I.ČLTK Prague Open – Men's singles =

Men's singles
- 2021 I.ČLTK Prague Open

Final
- Champion: (Netherlands) Tallon Griekspoor
- Runner-up: (Germany) Oscar Otte
- Score: 5–7, 6–4, 6–4

Events
Singles	men	women
Doubles	men	women
- I.ČLTK Prague Open

Stan Wawrinka was the defending champion but chose not to compete.

Tallon Griekspoor won the title after defeating Oscar Otte 5–7, 6–4, 6–4 in the final.

== Seeds ==
1. (Slovakia) Norbert Gombos (semifinals)
2. (Japan) Yūichi Sugita (first round, retired)
3. (Slovakia) Andrej Martin (second round)
4. (Austria) Dennis Novak (first round)
5. (United States) Denis Kudla (first round)
6. (Poland) Kamil Majchrzak (first round)
7. (Germany) Peter Gojowczyk (first round)
8. (India) Sumit Nagal (quarterfinals)

== Draw ==
Key

- Q = Qualifier
- WC = Wild card
- LL = Lucky loser
- Alt = Alternate
- ITF = ITF entry
- PR = Protected ranking
- SR = Special ranking
- SE = Special exempt
- JE = Junior exempt
- JR = Junior Accelerator Programme entrant
- CO = College Accelerator Programme entrant
- NG = Next Gen Accelerator Program entrant
- w/o = Walkover
- r = Retired
- d = Defaulted

=== Finals ===
Semifinals
1	(Slovakia) Norbert Gombos	6^{5}	3
(Netherlands) Tallon Griekspoor	7^{7}	6
WC	(Czech Republic) Michael Vrbenský	3	3
(Germany) Oscar Otte	6	6

Final
(Netherlands) Tallon Griekspoor	5	6	6
(Germany) Oscar Otte	7	4	4

=== Top half ===
First round
1	(Slovakia) N Gombos	6^{6}	6	6
(Switzerland) H Laaksonen	7^{8}	4	3
Q	(Poland) K Żuk	7^{7}	2	7
(Spain) M Vilella Martínez	6^{5}	6	5
(Kazakhstan) D Popko	3	4
Q	(Ukraine) S Stakhovsky	6	6
Q	(Czech Republic) Z Kolář	2	4
8	(India) S Nagal	6	6
4	(Austria) D Novak	4	6^{1}
SE	(Argentina) R Olivo	6	7^{7}
(Czech Republic) L Rosol	3	0
(Netherlands) T Griekspoor	6	6
(Italy) R Marcora	6^{4}	2
(Australia) M Polmans	7^{7}	6
(Portugal) F Ferreira Silva	6	6^{5}	6
6	(Poland) K Majchrzak	4	7^{7}	1

Second round
1	(Slovakia) N Gombos	6	6^{1}	6
Q	(Poland) K Żuk	3	7^{7}	3
Q	(Ukraine) S Stakhovsky	6	1	4
8	(India) S Nagal	4	6	6
SE	(Argentina) R Olivo	3	6^{3}
(Netherlands) T Griekspoor	6	7^{7}
(Australia) M Polmans	2	6	4
(Portugal) F Ferreira Silva	6	3	6

Quarterfinals
1	(Slovakia) N Gombos	6	6
8	(India) S Nagal	4	2
(Netherlands) T Griekspoor	6	6
(Portugal) F Ferreira Silva	2	4

Semifinals
1	(Slovakia) N Gombos	6^{5}	3
(Netherlands) T Griekspoor	7^{7}	6

=== Bottom half ===
First round
5	(United States) D Kudla	1	4
(Germany) Y Maden	6	6
Q	(Czech Republic) V Kopřiva	6	6^{4}	7^{8}
(Ukraine) I Marchenko	2	7^{7}	6^{6}
WC	(Czech Republic) M Vrbenský	7^{7}	6
(Austria) S Ofner	6^{4}	3
WC	(Czech Republic) A Paulson	3	3
3	(Slovakia) A Martin	6	6
7	(Germany) P Gojowczyk	3	1
(Germany) O Otte	6	6
WC	(Czech Republic) J Lehečka	4	6	7^{7}
(Russia) R Safiullin	6	3	6^{4}
(United States) M Cressy	6	6
(Egypt) M Safwat	2	2
(Chile) A Tabilo	7	4
2	(Japan) Y Sugita	5	0^{r}

Second round
(Germany) Y Maden	6	4	1
Q	(Czech Republic) V Kopřiva	4	6	6
WC	(Czech Republic) M Vrbenský	6	1	6
3	(Slovakia) A Martin	4	6	4
(Germany) O Otte	6	3	6
WC	(Czech Republic) J Lehečka	1	6	3
(United States) M Cressy	6	7
(Chile) A Tabilo	2	5

Quarterfinals
Q	(Czech Republic) V Kopřiva	1	4
WC	(Czech Republic) M Vrbenský	6	6
(Germany) O Otte	6	7
(United States) M Cressy	3	5

Semifinals
WC	(Czech Republic) M Vrbenský	3	3
(Germany) O Otte	6	6
