= 2011 Strabag Prague Open – Women's doubles =

Women's doubles
- 2011 Strabag Prague Open

Final
- Champions: (Belarus) Darya Kustova (Russia) Arina Rodionova
- Runners-up: (Ukraine) Olga Savchuk (Ukraine) Lesia Tsurenko
- Score: 2–6, 6–1, [10–7]

Details
- Draw: 16
- Seeds: 4

Events
Singles	men	women
Doubles	men	women
← 2010 ·	Strabag Prague Open	· 2015 →

The women's doubles of the 2011 Strabag Prague Open tournament was played on clay in Prague, Czech Republic.

Timea Bacsinszky and Tathiana Garbin were the defending champions but decided not to participate.
Darya Kustova and Arina Rodionova defeated Olga Savchuk and Lesia Tsurenko in the final 2–6, 6–1, [10–7].

== Seeds ==
1. (Czech Republic) Andrea Hlaváčková / (Czech Republic) Lucie Hradecká (second round)
2. (Austria) Yvonne Meusburger / (Germany) Kathrin Wörle (semifinals)
3. (Ukraine) Olga Savchuk / (Ukraine) Lesia Tsurenko (final)
4. (Belarus) Darya Kustova / (Russia) Arina Rodionova (champions)

== Draw ==
=== Key ===
- Q = Qualifier
- WC = Wild card
- LL = Lucky loser
- Alt = Alternate
- SE = Special exempt
- PR = Protected ranking
- ITF = ITF entry
- JE = Junior exempt
- w/o = Walkover
- r = Retired
- d = Defaulted
- SR = Special ranking

=== Draw ===
First round
1	(Czech Republic) A Hlaváčková (Czech Republic) L Hradecká	6	6
(Czech Republic) H Birnerová (Slovenia) M Zec Peškirič	3	3
(Netherlands) M Krajicek (Croatia) A Vrljić	3	6	[10]
(Brazil) A-C Duarte (Greece) I Georgatou	6	3	[6]
4	(Belarus) D Kustova (Russia) A Rodionova	6	6
(Ukraine) Y Beygelzimer (Ukraine) V Kapshay	3	4
(Czech Republic) Iveta Gerlová (Czech Republic) Lucie Kriegsmannová	1	2
(China) S Sun (China) Y Xu	6	6
(China) W Liu (China) J Lu	7	6
WC	(Czech Republic) D Allertová (Czech Republic) T Hejlová	5	4
(Peru) B Botto (Russia) E Ivanova	4	6	[6]
3	(Ukraine) O Savchuk (Ukraine) L Tsurenko	6	3	[10]
(United States) A Rolle (United States) M Washington	3	5
WC	(Czech Republic) Ka Plíšková (Czech Republic) Kr Plíšková	6	7
WC	(Czech Republic) J Malečková (Czech Republic) P Rohanová	2	6	[5]
2	(Austria) Y Meusburger (Germany) K Wörle	6	1	[10]

Quarterfinals
1	(Czech Republic) A Hlaváčková (Czech Republic) L Hradecká	5	5
(Netherlands) M Krajicek (Croatia) A Vrljić	7	7
4	(Belarus) D Kustova (Russia) A Rodionova	7	6
(China) S Sun (China) Y Xu	6^{2}	0
(China) Liu W (China) Lu J	3	6^{4}
3	(Ukraine) O Savchuk (Ukraine) L Tsurenko	6	7
WC	(Czech Republic) Ka Plíšková (Czech Republic) Kr Plíšková	4	2
2	(Austria) Y Meusburger (Germany) K Wörle	6	6

Semifinals
(Netherlands) M Krajicek (Croatia) A Vrljić	2	3
4	(Belarus) D Kustova (Russia) A Rodionova	6	6
3	(Ukraine) O Savchuk (Ukraine) L Tsurenko	6	6
2	(Austria) Y Meusburger (Germany) K Wörle	3	3

Final
4	(Belarus) D Kustova (Russia) A Rodionova	2	6	[10]
3	(Ukraine) O Savchuk (Ukraine) L Tsurenko	6	1	[7]
