= 1997 Skoda Czech Open – Singles =

Singles
- 1997 Skoda Czech Open
- 1995 Champion: (Romania) Ruxandra Dragomir

Final
- Champion: (South Africa) Joannette Kruger
- Runner-up: (Austria) Marion Maruska
- Score: 6–1, 6–1

Details
- Draw: 32
- Seeds: 8

Events
| Singles | Doubles |
- Skoda Czech Open

The women's singles of the 1997 Skoda Czech Open tournament was played on clay in Prague, Czech Republic.

Ruxandra Dragomir was the defending champion but lost in the second round to Ludmila Richterová.

Joannette Kruger won in the final 6–1, 6–1 against Marion Maruska.

== Seeds ==
A champion seed is indicated in bold text while text in italics indicates the round in which that seed was eliminated.

1. (Netherlands) Brenda Schultz-McCarthy (second round)
2. (Romania) Ruxandra Dragomir (second round)
3. (Slovakia) Karina Habšudová (quarterfinals)
4. (Switzerland) Patty Schnyder (first round)
5. (Czech Republic) Denisa Chládková (quarterfinals)
6. (Czech Republic) Adriana Gerši (first round)
7. (Slovakia) Katarína Studeníková (first round)
8. (Czech Republic) Sandra Kleinová (first round)

== Draw ==
Key

- Q = Qualifier
- WC = Wild card
- LL = Lucky loser
- Alt = Alternate
- ITF = ITF entry
- PR = Protected ranking
- SR = Special ranking
- SE = Special exempt
- JE = Junior exempt
- JR = Junior Accelerator Programme entrant
- CO = College Accelerator Programme entrant
- NG = Next Gen Accelerator Program entrant
- w/o = Walkover
- r = Retired
- d = Defaulted

First round
1 | (Netherlands) **B Schultz-McCarthy** | **6** | **6**
(Slovakia) R Zrubáková | 2 | 1
(France) **A D-Balleret** | **6** | 4 | **6**
(Czech Republic) E Martincová | 4 | **6** | 4
(South Africa) **J Kruger** | **6** | **6**
(Belarus) O Barabanschikova | 2 | 1
Q | (Georgia (country)) **N Louarsabishvili** | 3 | **6** | **6**
8 | (Czech Republic) S Kleinová | **6** | 2 | 2
4 | (Switzerland) P Schnyder | **6** | 6 | 4
(Germany) **W Probst** | 3 | **7** | **6**
Q | (Germany) **V Martinek** | **6** | **6**
(Czech Republic) P Langrová | 4 | 3
(Czech Republic) **R Bobková** | **6** | **6**
Q | (Czech Republic) E Melicharová | 3 | 4
WC | (Czech Republic) M Nekvapilova | **7** | 0 | 1
5 | (Czech Republic) **D Chládková** | 6 | **6** | **6**
7 | (Slovakia) K Studeníková | 0 | 2
(Austria) **M Maruska** | **6** | **6**
(Belgium) **L Courtois** | **6** | **7**
(Germany) J Kandarr | 2 | 6
(Argentina) **M Díaz Oliva** | **6** | **6**
(Argentina) P Suárez | 2 | 2
(Spain) G León García | 4 | 3
3 | (Slovakia) **K Habšudová** | **6** | **6**
6 | (Czech Republic) A Gerši | 2 | 1 | r
(Romania) **C Cristea** | **6** | **0**
(Canada) **R Simpson** | **7** | **6**
(Netherlands) K Boogert | 5 | 1
Q | (Czech Republic) R Pelikánová | 3 | 1
WC | (Czech Republic) **L Richterová** | **6** | **6**
(Poland) M Grzybowska | 3 | **6** | 4
2 | (Romania) **R Dragomir** | **6** | 4 | **6**

Second round
1 | (Netherlands) B Schultz-McCarthy | **6** | 2 | 1
(France) **A D-Balleret** | 3 | **6** | **6**
(South Africa) **J Kruger** | **6** | 5 | **6**
Q | (Georgia (country)) N Louarsabishvili | 2 | **7** | 4
(Germany) W Probst | 0 | 2
Q | (Germany) **V Martinek** | **6** | **6**
(Czech Republic) R Bobková | 6 | 4
5 | (Czech Republic) **D Chládková** | **7** | **6**
(Austria) **M Maruska** | **w/o**
(Belgium) L Courtois
(Argentina) M Díaz Oliva | **6** | 2 | 0/r
3 | (Slovakia) **K Habšudová** | 4 | **6** | **4**
(Romania) **C Cristea** | **6** | **6**
(Canada) R Simpson | 3 | 3
WC | (Czech Republic) **L Richterová** | **7** | **6**
2 | (Romania) R Dragomir | 6 | 4

Quarterfinals
(France) A D-Balleret | **6** | 6 | 1
(South Africa) **J Kruger** | 4 | **7** | **6**
Q | (Germany) **V Martinek** | **6** | **6**
5 | (Czech Republic) D Chládková | 4 | 0
(Austria) **M Maruska** | **7** | 1 | **6**
3 | (Slovakia) K Habšudová | 5 | **6** | 4
(Romania) **C Cristea** | **6** | 2 | **7**
WC | (Czech Republic) L Richterová | 2 | **6** | 5

Semifinals
(South Africa) **J Kruger** | **7** | **6**
Q | (Germany) V Martinek | 5 | 1
(Austria) **M Maruska** | **6** | **6**
(Romania) C Cristea | 2 | 1

Final
(South Africa) **Joannette Kruger** | **6** | **6**
(Austria) Marion Maruska | 1 | 1
