= 1997 Skoda Czech Open – Doubles =

Doubles
- 1997 Skoda Czech Open

Final
- Champions: (Romania) Ruxandra Dragomir; (Slovakia) Karina Habšudová
- Runners-up: (Czech Republic) Eva Martincová; (Czech Republic) Helena Vildová
- Score: 6–1, 5–7, 6–2

Details
- Draw: 16
- Seeds: 4

Events
Singles	Doubles
- Skoda Czech Open

The women's doubles of the 1997 Skoda Czech Open tournament played on clay in Prague, Czech Republic.

Karina Habšudová and Helena Suková were the defending champions but only Habšudová competed that year with Ruxandra Dragomir.

Dragomir and Habšudová won in the final 6–1, 5–7, 6–2 against Eva Martincová and Helena Vildová.

== Seeds ==
Champion seeds are indicated in bold text while text in italics indicates the round in which those seeds were eliminated.

1. (Romania) **Ruxandra Dragomir** / (Slovakia) **Karina Habšudová (champions)**
2. (Netherlands) Kristie Boogert / (France) Alexia Dechaume-Balleret (semifinals)
3. (Czech Republic) Eva Martincová / (Czech Republic) Helena Vildová (final)
4. (Canada) Sonya Jeyaseelan / (Canada) Rene Simpson (semifinals)

== Draw ==
Key

- Q = Qualifier
- WC = Wild card
- LL = Lucky loser
- Alt = Alternate
- ITF = ITF entry
- PR = Protected ranking
- SR = Special ranking
- SE = Special exempt
- JE = Junior exempt
- JR = Junior Accelerator Programme entrant
- CO = College Accelerator Programme entrant
- NG = Next Gen Accelerator Program entrant
- w/o = Walkover
- r = Retired
- d = Defaulted

First round

Quarterfinals

Semifinals

Final

1
- (Romania) **R Dragomir**
- (Slovakia) **K Habšudová**
**6**
1
**6**

Q
- (Czech Republic) J Pospíšilová
- (Czech Republic) L Richterová
2
**6**
4

1
- (Romania) **R Dragomir**
- (Slovakia) **K Habšudová**
4
**6**
**6**

- (Czech Republic) K Kroupová
- (Czech Republic) A Vašková
6
5

- (Georgia (country)) N Louarsabishvili
- (Hungary) K Marosi
**6**
3
4

- (Georgia (country)) **N Louarsabishvili**
- (Hungary) **K Marosi**
**7**
**7**

1
- (Romania) **R Dragomir**
- (Slovakia) **K Habšudová**
3
**7**
**6**

4
- (Canada) **S Jeyaseelan**
- (Canada) **R Simpson**
3
**6**
**6**

4
- (Canada) S Jeyaseelan
- (Canada) R Simpson
**6**
6
1

- (Hungary) V Csurgo
- (Germany) C Schneider
**6**
3
4

4
- (Canada) **S Jeyaseelan**
- (Canada) **R Simpson**
**6**
**6**

WC
- (Czech Republic) D Chládková
- (Czech Republic) S Kleinová
3
2

LL
- (South Africa) J Kruger
- (Austria) M Maruska
4
1

LL
- (South Africa) **J Kruger**
- (Austria) **M Maruska**
**6**
**6**

1
- (Romania) **Ruxandra Dragomir**
- (Slovakia) **Karina Habšudová**
**6**
5
**6**

- (United States) R Jensen
- (Netherlands) B Schultz-McCarthy
6
r

3
- (Czech Republic) Eva Martincová
- (Czech Republic) Helena Vildová
1
**7**
2

- (Switzerland) **P Schnyder**
- (Argentina) **P Suárez**
**7**

- (Switzerland) P Schnyder
- (Argentina) P Suárez
1
3

- (Romania) C Cristea
- (Poland) M Grzybowska
**6**
4
3

3
- (Czech Republic) **E Martincová**
- (Czech Republic) **H Vildová**
**6**
**6**

3
- (Czech Republic) **E Martincová**
- (Czech Republic) **H Vildová**
4
**6**
**6**

3
- (Czech Republic) **E Martincová**
- (Czech Republic) **H Vildová**
0
**6**
**6**

- (Ukraine) O Lugina
- (Ukraine) E Tatarkova
**7**
3
6

2
- (Netherlands) K Boogert
- (France) A Dechaume-Balleret
**6**
2
3

- (Czech Republic) **R Bobková**
- (Czech Republic) **E Melicharová**
5
**6**
**7**

- (Czech Republic) R Bobková
- (Czech Republic) E Melicharová
2
2

- (Czech Republic) P Langrová
- (Slovakia) R Zrubáková
1
1

2
- (Netherlands) **K Boogert**
- (France) **A Dechaume-Balleret**
**6**
**6**

2
- (Netherlands) **K Boogert**
- (France) **A Dechaume-Balleret**
**6**
**6**
