= 2021 I.ČLTK Prague Open =

- Date: 3–9 May 2021
- Edition: 28th (men); 16th (women)
- Prize money: €44,820 (men) $25,000 (women)
- Surface: Clay
- Location: Prague, Czech Republic

Champions

Men's singles
- (Netherlands) Tallon Griekspoor

Women's singles
- (Germany) Jule Niemeier

Men's doubles
- (Australia) Marc Polmans / (Ukraine) Sergiy Stakhovsky

Women's doubles
- (Hungary) Anna Bondár / (Belgium) Kimberley Zimmermann
- I.ČLTK Prague Open

The 2021 I.ČLTK Prague Open was a professional tennis tournament played on outdoor clay courts. It was the 28th (men) and 16th (women) editions of the tournament which was part of the 2021 ATP Challenger Tour and the 2021 ITF Women's World Tennis Tour. It took place in Prague, Czech Republic from 3 to 9 May 2021.

== Men's singles main-draw entrants ==
=== Seeds ===
| Country | Player | Rank^{1} | Seed |
|---|---|---|---|
| SVK | Norbert Gombos | 95 | 1 |
| JPN | Yūichi Sugita | 109 | 2 |
| SVK | Andrej Martin | 110 | 3 |
| AUT | Dennis Novak | 111 | 4 |
| USA | Denis Kudla | 117 | 5 |
| POL | Kamil Majchrzak | 123 | 6 |
| GER | Peter Gojowczyk | 132 | 7 |
| IND | Sumit Nagal | 137 | 8 |

- ^{1} Rankings are as of 26 April 2021.

=== Other entrants ===
The following players received wildcards into the singles main draw:

- (Czech Republic) Jiří Lehečka
- (Czech Republic) Andrew Paulson
- (Czech Republic) Michael Vrbenský

The following player received entry into the singles main draw as a special exempt:

- (Argentina) Renzo Olivo

The following players received entry from the qualifying draw:

- (Czech Republic) Zdeněk Kolář
- (Czech Republic) Vít Kopřiva
- (Ukraine) Sergiy Stakhovsky
- (Poland) Kacper Żuk

== Women's singles main-draw entrants ==
=== Seeds ===
| Country | Player | Rank^{1} | Seed |
|---|---|---|---|
| SVK | Viktória Kužmová | 106 | 1 |
| ROU | Jaqueline Cristian | 147 | 2 |
| AUT | Barbara Haas | 156 | 3 |
| ROU | Elena-Gabriela Ruse | 175 | 4 |
| TUR | Çağla Büyükakçay | 177 | 5 |
| NED | Lesley Pattinama Kerkhove | 179 | 6 |
| SVK | Rebecca Šramková | 196 | 7 |
| AUT | Julia Grabher | 197 | 8 |

- ^{1} Rankings are as of 26 April 2021.

=== Other entrants ===
The following players received wildcards into the singles main draw:

- (Czech Republic) Nikola Bartůňková
- (Croatia) Ana Konjuh
- (Czech Republic) Linda Nosková
- (Czech Republic) Darja Viďmanová

The following player received entry using a protected ranking:

- (India) Karman Thandi

The following players received entry from the qualifying draw:

- (Hungary) Anna Bondár
- (United Kingdom) Amanda Carreras
- (Czech Republic) Johana Marková
- (Germany) Jule Niemeier
- (Argentina) Paula Ormaechea
- (Turkey) İpek Öz
- (Slovakia) Chantal Škamlová
- (Belarus) Shalimar Talbi

== Champions ==
=== Men's singles ===
- (Netherlands) Tallon Griekspoor def. (Germany) Oscar Otte 5–7, 6–4, 6–4.

=== Women's singles ===
- (Germany) Jule Niemeier def. (Hungary) Dalma Gálfi, 6–4, 6–2

=== Men's doubles ===
- (Australia) Marc Polmans / (Ukraine) Sergiy Stakhovsky def. (Croatia) Ivan Sabanov / (Croatia) Matej Sabanov 6–3, 6–4.

=== Women's doubles ===
- (Hungary) Anna Bondár / (Belgium) Kimberley Zimmermann def. (Switzerland) Xenia Knoll / (Romania) Elena-Gabriela Ruse, 7–6^{(7–5)}, 6–2
