= 2017 Advantage Cars Prague Open – Women's doubles =

Women's doubles
- 2017 Advantage Cars Prague Open

Final
- Champion: (Russia) Anastasia Potapova (Ukraine) Dayana Yastremska
- Runner-up: (Romania) Mihaela Buzărnescu (Ukraine) Alona Fomina
- Score: 6–2, 6–2

Events
Singles	men	women
Doubles	men	women
- Advantage Cars Prague Open

The women's doubles of the 2017 Advantage Cars Prague Open tournament was played on clay in Prague, Czech Republic.

Demi Schuurs and Renata Voráčová were the defending champions, but both players chose not to participate.

Anastasia Potapova and Dayana Yastremska won the title, defeating Mihaela Buzărnescu and Alona Fomina in the final, 6–2, 6–2.

== Seeds ==
1. (Russia) Anastasiya Komardina / (Bulgaria) Elitsa Kostova (first round)
2. (Czech Republic) Lenka Kunčíková / (Netherlands) Eva Wacanno (first round)
3. (Romania) Mihaela Buzărnescu / (Ukraine) Alona Fomina (final)
4. (Slovenia) Dalila Jakupović / (Switzerland) Amra Sadiković (quarterfinals)

== Draw ==
Key

- Q = Qualifier
- WC = Wild card
- LL = Lucky loser
- Alt = Alternate
- ITF = ITF entry
- PR = Protected ranking
- SR = Special ranking
- SE = Special exempt
- JE = Junior exempt
- JR = Junior Accelerator Programme entrant
- CO = College Accelerator Programme entrant
- NG = Next Gen Accelerator Program entrant
- w/o = Walkover
- r = Retired
- d = Defaulted

First round
1	(Russia) A Komardina (Bulgaria) E Kostova	3	6	[4]
(India) A Raina (Georgia (country)) S Shapatava	6	2	[10]
(France) F Ferro (Italy) C Rosatello	2	1
(Russia) A Potapova (Ukraine) D Yastremska	6	6
4	(Slovenia) D Jakupović (Switzerland) A Sadiković	3	6	[10]
Alt	(Czech Republic) M Bayerlová (Czech Republic) V Žovincová	6	4	[5]
Alt	(Sweden) K Filip (Russia) Ann Pribylova	1	0
(Russia) Ana Pribylova (Czech Republic) A Zarycká	6	6
(Finland) E Laine (United States) S Santamaria	6^{6}	4
WC	(United States) N Suk (Czech Republic) K Vaňková	7^{8}	6
(Czech Republic) L Hradecká (Czech Republic) J Malečková	3	1
3	(Romania) M Buzărnescu (Ukraine) A Fomina	6	6
(Romania) RG Șerban (Russia) E Yashina	5	3
WC	(Czech Republic) D Allertová (Czech Republic) P Krejsová	7	6
(Czech Republic) K Kramperová (Czech Republic) M Vondroušová	7	6
2	(Czech Republic) L Kunčíková (Netherlands) E Wacanno	5	3

Quarterfinals
(India) A Raina (Georgia (country)) S Shapatava	0	1
(Russia) A Potapova (Ukraine) D Yastremska	6	6
4	(Slovenia) D Jakupović (Switzerland) A Sadiković	2	6	[11]
(Russia) Ana Pribylova (Czech Republic) A Zarycká	6	2	[13]
WC	(United States) N Suk (Czech Republic) K Vaňková	5	2
3	(Romania) M Buzărnescu (Ukraine) A Fomina	7	6
WC	(Czech Republic) D Allertová (Czech Republic) P Krejsová	6	2	[10]
(Czech Republic) K Kramperová (Czech Republic) M Vondroušová	2	6	[6]

Semifinals
(Russia) A Potapova (Ukraine) D Yastremska	6	3	[12]
(Russia) Ana Pribylova (Czech Republic) A Zarycká	0	6	[10]
3	(Romania) M Buzărnescu (Ukraine) A Fomina	1	7^{7}	[12]
WC	(Czech Republic) D Allertová (Czech Republic) P Krejsová	6	6^{1}	[10]

Final
(Russia) A Potapova (Ukraine) D Yastremska	6	6
3	(Romania) M Buzărnescu (Ukraine) A Fomina	2	2
