= 2011 Strabag Prague Open =

- Date: 2–8 May
- Edition: 18th (Men) / 10th (Women)
- Surface: Clay / outdoor
- Location: Prague, Czech Republic
- Venue: I. Czech Lawn Tennis Club

Champions

Men's singles
- (Czech Republic) Lukáš Rosol

Women's singles
- (Czech Republic) Lucie Hradecká

Men's doubles
- (Czech Republic) František Čermák / (Czech Republic) Lukáš Rosol

Women's doubles
- (Belarus) Darya Kustova / (Russia) Arina Rodionova
- Strabag Prague Open

The 2011 Strabag Prague Open was a professional tennis tournament played on clay courts. It was the 18th edition of the men's tournament which was part of the 2011 ATP Challenger Tour and the 10th edition of the women's tournament, part of 2011 ITF Women's Circuit. It was part of the WTA Tour in the previous year, but was degraded to ITF event this year. It took place in Prague, Czech Republic between 2 and 8 May 2011.

The tournament included tennis exhibition involving Karolína Plíšková, Kristýna Plíšková and Martina Hingis and Daja Bedanova.

== ATP entrants ==
=== Seeds ===
Country	Player	Rank^{1}	Seed
FRA	Jérémy Chardy	53	1
BUL	Grigor Dimitrov	69	2
FRA	Julien Benneteau	83	3
GER	Matthias Bachinger	96	4
CZE	Jan Hájek	98	5
FRA	Florent Serra	100	6
POR	Rui Machado	102	7
USA	Alex Bogomolov Jr.	104	8

- Rankings are as of April 25, 2011.

=== Other entrants ===
The following players received wildcards into the singles main draw:

- (Czech Republic) Jan Blecha
- (Brazil) Tiago Fernandes
- (Chile) Fernando González
- (Czech Republic) Jiří Veselý

The following players received entry as a special exempt into the singles main draw:

- (Hungary) Ádám Kellner
- (France) Stéphane Robert

The following players received entry from the qualifying draw:

- (Germany) Dennis Blömke
- (Belarus) Aliaksandr Bury
- (France) Nicolas Devilder
- (Australia) James Lemke

== WTA entrants ==
=== Seeds ===
Country	Player	Rank^{1}	Seed
CZE	Lucie Hradecká	66	1
ITA	Romina Oprandi	92	2
CZE	Andrea Hlaváčková	94	3
AUT	Patricia Mayr-Achleitner	97	4
AUT	Yvonne Meusburger	119	5
JPN	Misaki Doi	124	6
UKR	Lesia Tsurenko	128	7
GER	Sabine Lisicki	132	8

- Rankings are as of April 25, 2011.

=== Other entrants ===
The following players received wildcards into the singles main draw:

- (Germany) Gesa Focke
- (Czech Republic) Tereza Hejlová
- (Czech Republic) Karolína Plíšková
- (Czech Republic) Krystina Plíšková

The following players received entry from the qualifying draw:

- (Slovakia) Jana Čepelová
- (Slovakia) Lenka Juríková
- (Argentina) Paula Ormaechea
- (Russia) Arina Rodionova

The following players received entry as a lucky loser:

- (Brazil) Ana Clara Duarte

== Finals ==
=== Men's singles ===
(Czech Republic) Lukáš Rosol defeated (United States) Alex Bogomolov Jr., 7–6^{(7–1)}, 5–2 retired

=== Women's singles ===
(Czech Republic) Lucie Hradecká defeated (Argentina) Paula Ormaechea, 4–6, 6–3, 6–2

=== Men's doubles ===
(Czech Republic) František Čermák / (Czech Republic) Lukáš Rosol defeated (Germany) Christopher Kas / (Austria) Alexander Peya, 6–3, 6–4

=== Women's doubles ===
(Belarus) Darya Kustova / (Russia) Arina Rodionova defeated (Ukraine) Olga Savchuk / (Ukraine) Lesia Tsurenko, 2–6, 6–1, [10–7]
