= 2009 ECM Prague Open – Doubles =

Doubles
- 2009 ECM Prague Open

Final
- Champions: (Ukraine) Alona Bondarenko (Ukraine) Kateryna Bondarenko
- Runners-up: (Czech Republic) Iveta Benešová (Czech Republic) Barbora Záhlavová-Strýcová
- Score: 6–1, 6–2

Details
- Draw: 16
- Seeds: 4

Events
Singles	Doubles
- ECM Prague Open

The women's doubles of the 2009 ECM Prague Open tournament was played on clay in Prague, Czech Republic.

Andrea Hlaváčková and Lucie Hradecká was the defending champions, but lost in the semifinal with Iveta Benešová and Barbora Záhlavová-Strýcová.

Alona Bondarenko and Kateryna Bondarenko won in the final 6–1, 6–2, against Iveta Benešová and Barbora Záhlavová-Strýcová.

== Seeds ==
1. (Czech Republic) Iveta Benešová / (Czech Republic) Barbora Záhlavová-Strýcová (final)
2. (Ukraine) Alona Bondarenko / (Ukraine) Kateryna Bondarenko (champions)
3. (Czech Republic) Andrea Hlaváčková / (Czech Republic) Lucie Hradecká (semifinals)
4. (Romania) Ioana Raluca Olaru / (Israel) Shahar Pe'er (first round; withdrew)

== Draw ==
Key

- Q = Qualifier
- WC = Wild card
- LL = Lucky loser
- Alt = Alternate
- ITF = ITF entry
- PR = Protected ranking
- SR = Special ranking
- SE = Special exempt
- JE = Junior exempt
- JR = Junior Accelerator Programme entrant
- CO = College Accelerator Programme entrant
- NG = Next Gen Accelerator Program entrant
- w/o = Walkover
- r = Retired
- d = Defaulted

=== Draw ===
First round
1	(Czech Republic) I Benešová (Czech Republic) B Záhlavová-Strýcová	6	6
(Greece) E Daniilidou (Germany) J Wöhr	4	2
(Russia) E Ivanova (Russia) A Lapushchenkova	4	6	[8]
WC	(Czech Republic) P Kvitová (Czech Republic) N Vaidišová	6	3	[10]
3	(Czech Republic) A Hlaváčková (Czech Republic) L Hradecká	6	6
(Argentina) E Krauth (Sweden) H Nooni	3	2
(Czech Republic) E Birnerová (Czech Republic) E Hrdinová	4	6	[7]
(Russia) M Kondratieva (France) S Lefèvre	6	2	[10]
(Germany) K Barrois (Switzerland) S Vögele	3	7	[9]
(Austria) S Klemenschits (Germany) T Malek	6	5	[11]
(Slovakia) M Rybáriková (Czech Republic) R Voráčová	6	6
ALT	(United Kingdom) K O'Brien (Georgia (country)) A Tatishvili	4	4
(Poland) O Brózda (Poland) M Kiszczyńska	6	6
(Czech Republic) N Fraňková (Germany) V Henke	3	2
(Ukraine) V Kapshay (Bulgaria) T Pironkova	5	4
2	(Ukraine) A Bondarenko (Ukraine) K Bondarenko	7	6

Quarterfinals
1	(Czech Republic) I Benešová (Czech Republic) B Záhlavová-Strýcová	6	6
WC	(Czech Republic) P Kvitová (Czech Republic) N Vaidišová	2	3
3	(Czech Republic) A Hlaváčková (Czech Republic) L Hradecká	7	6
(Russia) M Kondratieva (France) S Lefèvre	6^{5}	2
(Austria) S Klemenschits (Germany) T Malek	2	3
(Slovakia) M Rybáriková (Czech Republic) R Voráčová	6	6
(Poland) O Brózda (Poland) M Kiszczyńska	4	1
2	(Ukraine) A Bondarenko (Ukraine) K Bondarenko	6	6

Semifinals
1	(Czech Republic) I Benešová (Czech Republic) B Záhlavová-Strýcová	1	6	[12]
3	(Czech Republic) A Hlaváčková (Czech Republic) L Hradecká	6	1	[10]
(Slovakia) M Rybáriková (Czech Republic) R Voráčová	4	5
2	(Ukraine) A Bondarenko (Ukraine) K Bondarenko	6	7

Final
1	(Czech Republic) I Benešová (Czech Republic) B Záhlavová-Strýcová	1	2
2	(Ukraine) A Bondarenko (Ukraine) K Bondarenko	6	6
