= 2012 CNGvitall Prague Open =

- Date: 7–13 May
- Edition: 19th
- Surface: Clay
- Location: Prague, Czech Republic
- Venue: I. Czech Lawn Tennis Club

Champions

Singles
- (Argentina) Horacio Zeballos

Doubles
- (Czech Republic) Lukáš Rosol / (Argentina) Horacio Zeballos
- CNGvitall Prague Open

The 2012 CNGvitall Prague Open, known also as 2012 CNGvitall Prague Open by Noncore for sponsorship reasons, was a professional tennis tournament played on clay courts. It was the 19th edition of the tournament which is part of the 2012 ATP Challenger Tour. It took place in Prague, Czech Republic between 7 and 13 May 2012.

== ATP entrants ==
=== Seeds ===
Country	Player	Rank^{1}	Seed
ISR	Dudi Sela	63	1
SVK	Lukáš Lacko	65	2
CZE	Lukáš Rosol	79	3
GER	Tobias Kamke	81	4
BUL	Grigor Dimitrov	94	5
SVK	Martin Kližan	101	6
GER	Matthias Bachinger	103	7
GER	Daniel Brands	105	8

- Rankings are as of April 30, 2012.

=== Other entrants ===
The following players received wildcards into the singles main draw:

- (Czech Republic) Jan Blecha
- (Croatia) Mate Pavić
- (Czech Republic) Jiří Veselý

The following players received entry as a special exempt into the singles main draw:

- (Italy) Matteo Marrai
- (Czech Republic) Dušan Lojda

The following players received entry from the qualifying draw:

- (Austria) Martin Fischer
- (Slovakia) Miloslav Mečíř
- (Germany) Dominik Meffert
- (Germany) Kevin Krawietz

The following player received entry from a Lucky loser spot:

- (France) Axel Michon

== Champions ==
=== Men's singles ===
- (Argentina) Horacio Zeballos def. (Slovakia) Martin Kližan, 1–6, 6–4, 7–6^{(8–6)}.

=== Men's doubles ===
- (Czech Republic) Lukáš Rosol / (Argentina) Horacio Zeballos def. (Slovakia) Martin Kližan / (Slovakia) Igor Zelenay, 7–5, 2–6, [12–10].
