= 2021 I.ČLTK Prague Open – Women's doubles =

Women's doubles
- 2021 I.ČLTK Prague Open

Final
- Champions: (Hungary) Anna Bondár (Belgium) Kimberley Zimmermann
- Runners-up: (Switzerland) Xenia Knoll (Romania) Elena-Gabriela Ruse
- Score: 7–6^{(7–5)}, 6–2

Events
Singles	men	women
Doubles	men	women
- I.ČLTK Prague Open

The women's doubles of the 2021 I.ČLTK Prague Open tournament was played on clay in Prague, Czech Republic.

Nicoleta Dascălu and Raluca Șerban were the defending champions, but chose not to participate.

Anna Bondár and Kimberley Zimmermann won the title, defeating Xenia Knoll and Elena-Gabriela Ruse in the final, 7–6^{(7–5)}, 6–2.

== Seeds ==
1. (Switzerland) Xenia Knoll / (Romania) Elena-Gabriela Ruse (final)
2. (Hungary) Anna Bondár / (Belgium) Kimberley Zimmermann (champions)
3. (Czech Republic) Anastasia Dețiuc / (Czech Republic) Johana Marková (semifinals)
4. (Germany) Tayisiya Morderger / (Germany) Yana Morderger (quarterfinals)

== Draw ==
Key

- Q = Qualifier
- WC = Wild card
- LL = Lucky loser
- Alt = Alternate
- ITF = ITF entry
- PR = Protected ranking
- SR = Special ranking
- SE = Special exempt
- JE = Junior exempt
- JR = Junior Accelerator Programme entrant
- CO = College Accelerator Programme entrant
- NG = Next Gen Accelerator Program entrant
- w/o = Walkover
- r = Retired
- d = Defaulted

=== Draw ===
First round
(Czech Republic) K Kubáňová (Czech Republic) L Ševčíková	3	6	[11]
(Austria) B Haas (Slovakia) R Šramková	6	4	[13]
4	(Germany) T Morderger (Germany) Y Morderger	6	3	[10]
(Czech Republic) A Laboutková (Czech Republic) A Zarycká	4	6	[6]
(Czech Republic) L Nosková (Czech Republic) N Tomanová	5	4
(Slovakia) C Škamlová (Czech Republic) T Smitková	7	6
(Georgia (country)) M Bolkvadze (India) K Thandi	0	1^{r}
(Chinese Taipei) E-s Liang (Belarus) S Talbi	6	4
(Czech Republic) N Bartůňková (Czech Republic) D Hindová	6	6
(Turkey) Ç Büyükakçay (Canada) R Marino	1	3

Quarterfinals
1	(Switzerland) X Knoll (Romania) E-G Ruse	7	6
(Austria) B Haas (Slovakia) R Šramková	5	4
4	(Germany) T Morderger (Germany) Y Morderger	4	4
(Slovakia) C Škamlová (Czech Republic) T Smitkova	6	6
(Chinese Taipei) E-s Liang (Belarus) S Talbi	5	7	[10]
3	(Czech Republic) A Dețiuc (Czech Republic) J Marková	7	6^{8}	[12]
(Czech Republic) N Bartůňková (Czech Republic) D Hindová	4	2
2	(Hungary) A Bondár (Belgium) K Zimmermann	6	6

Semifinals
1	(Switzerland) X Knoll (Romania) E-G Ruse	6	6
(Slovakia) C Skamlova (Czech Republic) T Smitkova	4	3
3	(Czech Republic) A Dețiuc (Czech Republic) J Marková	6^{4}	3
2	(Hungary) A Bondár (Belgium) K Zimmermann	7	6

Final
1	(Switzerland) X Knoll (Romania) E-G Ruse	6^{5}	2
2	(Hungary) A Bondár (Belgium) K Zimmermann	7	6
