= 2014 Advantage Cars Prague Open =

Professional tennis tournament

- Date: 4 – 10 August
- Edition: 21st
- Location: Prague, Czech Republic
- Venue: I. Czech Lawn Tennis Club

Champions

Singles
- (Argentina) Diego Schwartzman

Doubles
- (Croatia) Toni Androić / (Russia) Andrey Kuznetsov
- Advantage Cars Prague Open

The 2014 Advantage Cars Prague Open, also known as Advantage Cars Prague Open by I. ČLTK Praha for sponsorship reasons, was a professional tennis tournament played on clay courts. It was the 21st edition of the tournament which was part of the 2014 ATP Challenger Tour. It took place in Prague, Czech Republic between 4 and 10 August 2014.

== ATP entrants ==
=== Seeds ===
| Country | Player | Rank^{1} | Seed |
|---|---|---|---|
| ARG | Diego Schwartzman | 100 | 1 |
| RUS | Andrey Kuznetsov | 107 | 2 |
| POL | Michał Przysiężny | 145 | 3 |
| AUT | Gerald Melzer | 147 | 4 |
| FRA | Grégoire Burquier | 171 | 5 |
| SVK | Miloslav Mečíř | 173 | 6 |
| RUS | Valery Rudnev | 211 | 7 |
| IRL | Louk Sorensen | 212 | 8 |

- ^{1} Rankings are as of July 28, 2014.

=== Other entrants ===
The following players received wildcards into the singles main draw:

- (Czech Republic) Dušan Lojda
- (Slovakia) Adrian Sikora
- (Czech Republic) David Simunek
- (Czech Republic) Robin Stanek

The following player received a special exemption into the singles main draw:

- (Chinese Taipei) Yang Tsung-hua

The following player entered into the singles main draw as an alternate:

- (Australia) Alex Bolt

The following players received entry from the qualifying draw:

- (Serbia) Miki Janković
- (Slovakia) Jozef Kovalík
- (Brazil) Thiago Monteiro
- (Czech Republic) Tomáš Papik

== Champions ==
=== Singles ===
- (Argentina) Diego Schwartzman def. (Brazil) André Ghem 6–4, 7–5

=== Doubles ===
- (Croatia) Toni Androić / (Russia) Andrey Kuznetsov def. (Venezuela) Roberto Maytín / (Mexico) Miguel Ángel Reyes-Varela 7–5, 7–5
