= 2021 I.ČLTK Prague Open – Women's singles =

Women's singles
- 2021 I.ČLTK Prague Open

Final
- Champion: (Germany) Jule Niemeier
- Runner-up: (Hungary) Dalma Gálfi
- Score: 6–4, 6–2

Events
Singles	men	women
Doubles	men	women
- I.ČLTK Prague Open

The women's singles of the 2021 I.ČLTK Prague Open tournament was played on clay in Prague, Czech Republic.

Tamara Korpatsch was the defending champion, but chose not to participate.

Jule Niemeier won the title, starting from qualifications, defeating Dalma Gálfi in the final, 6–4, 6–2.

== Seeds ==
1. (Slovakia) Viktória Kužmová (second round)
2. (Romania) Jaqueline Cristian (first round)
3. (Austria) Barbara Haas (second round)
4. (Romania) Elena-Gabriela Ruse (semifinals)
5. (Turkey) Çağla Büyükakçay (quarterfinals)
6. (Netherlands) Lesley Pattinama Kerkhove (first round)
7. (Slovakia) Rebecca Šramková (second round)
8. (Austria) Julia Grabher (second round)

== Draw ==
Key

- Q = Qualifier
- WC = Wild card
- LL = Lucky loser
- Alt = Alternate
- ITF = ITF entry
- PR = Protected ranking
- SR = Special ranking
- SE = Special exempt
- JE = Junior exempt
- JR = Junior Accelerator Programme entrant
- CO = College Accelerator Programme entrant
- NG = Next Gen Accelerator Program entrant
- w/o = Walkover
- r = Retired
- d = Defaulted

=== Finals ===
Semifinals
(Hungary) Dalma Gálfi	6	6
4	(Romania) Elena-Gabriela Ruse	4	4
Q	(Germany) Jule Niemeier	6	6
(Chile) Daniela Seguel	3	1

Final
(Hungary) Dalma Gálfi	4	2
Q	(Germany) Jule Niemeier	6	6

=== Top half ===
First round
1	(Slovakia) V Kužmová	6	6
(Netherlands) I de Vroome	3	2
(Hungary) D Gálfi	7	6
Q	(Slovakia) C Škamlová	6^{1}	4
Q	(United Kingdom) A Carreras	0	0
WC	(Croatia) A Konjuh	6	6
Q	(Turkey) İ Öz	7	7
6	(Netherlands) L Pattinama Kerkhove	5	6^{3}
4	(Romania) E-G Ruse	5	6	6
(Chinese Taipei) E-s Liang	7	4	1
Q	(Argentina) P Ormaechea	6	6
(Turkey) P Özgen	4	1
Q	(Czech Republic) J Marková	5	7	3
SR	(India) K Thandi	7	6^{6}	6
WC	(Czech Republic) N Bartůňková	4	5
5	(Turkey) Ç Büyükakçay	6	7

Second round
1	(Slovakia) V Kužmová	3	3
(Hungary) D Gálfi	6	6
WC	(Croatia) A Konjuh	6	6
Q	(Turkey) İ Öz	1	4
4	(Romania) E-G Ruse	6	6
Q	(Argentina) P Ormaechea	4	1
SR	(India) K Thandi	5	1
5	(Turkey) Ç Büyükakçay	7	6

Quarterfinals
(Hungary) D Gálfi	6	6
WC	(Croatia) A Konjuh	1	4
4	(Romania) E-G Ruse	6	6
5	(Turkey) Ç Büyükakçay	2	3

Semifinals
(Hungary) D Gálfi	6	6
4	(Romania) E-G Ruse	4	4

=== Bottom half ===
First round
8	(Austria) J Grabher	6^{3}	6	6
WC	(Czech Republic) L Nosková	7	1	0
Q	(Germany) J Niemeier	6	6
WC	(Netherlands) D Viďmanová	2	4
Q	(Belarus) S Talbi	3	2
Q	(Hungary) A Bondár	6	6
(Canada) R Marino	0	4
3	(Austria) B Haas	6	6
7	(Slovakia) R Šramková	6	6
(Australia) D Aiava	1	4
(Hungary) RL Jani	6	6
(South Korea) N-l Han	4	4
(Italy) M Di Giuseppe	6	3	6
(Georgia (country)) M Bolkvadze	4	6	3
(Chile) D Seguel	6	6
2	(Romania) J Cristian	2	2

Second round
8	(Austria) J Grabher	3	6^{4}
Q	(Germany) J Niemeier	6	7
Q	(Hungary) A Bondár	6	3	6
3	(Austria) B Haas	4	6	4
7	(Slovakia) R Šramková	6	3	2
(Hungary) RL Jani	1	6	6
(Italy) M Di Giuseppe	3	0
(Chile) D Seguel	6	6

Quarterfinals
Q	(Germany) J Niemeier	2	6	6
Q	(Hungary) A Bondár	6	3	1
(Hungary) RL Jani	6	3	6^{1}
(Chile) D Seguel	4	6	7

Semifinals
Q	(Germany) J Niemeier	6	6
(Chile) D Seguel	3	1
