= 2017 Advantage Cars Prague Open =

Tennis tournament in the Czech Republic

- Date: 24–30 July
- Edition: 24th (men); 13th (women)
- Category: ATP Challenger Tour; ITF Women's Circuit
- Prize money: €43,000+H (men) $80,000 (women)
- Surface: Clay
- Location: Prague, Czech Republic
- Venue: I. Czech Lawn Tennis Club

Champions

Men's singles
- (Slovakia) Andrej Martin

Women's singles
- (Czech Republic) Markéta Vondroušová

Men's doubles
- (Czech Republic) Jan Šátral / (Austria) Tristan-Samuel Weissborn

Women's doubles
- (Russia) Anastasia Potapova / (Ukraine) Dayana Yastremska
- Advantage Cars Prague Open

The 2017 Advantage Cars Prague Open by Zenova was a professional tennis tournament played on outdoor clay courts. It was the 24th (men) and third (women) editions of the tournament and was part of the 2017 ATP Challenger Tour and the 13th edition of the women's tournament, this year as part of 2017 ITF Women's Circuit. It took place in Prague, Czech Republic, on 24–30 July 2017.

== Men's singles main draw entrants ==
=== Seeds ===
Country	Player	Rank^{1}	Seed
CZE	Adam Pavlásek	123	1
BLR	Uladzimir Ignatik	135	2
~~SRB~~	~~Filip Krajinović~~	~~144~~	~~3~~
SVK	Andrej Martin	149	4
SVK	Jozef Kovalík	154	5
CZE	Lukáš Rosol	175	6
GER	Tobias Kamke	185	7
CZE	Jan Šátral	188	8
POR	João Domingues	195	9

- ^{1} Rankings as of 17 July 2017.

=== Other entrants ===
The following players received a wildcard into the singles main draw:

- (Czech Republic) Dominik Kellovský
- (Czech Republic) Vít Kopřiva
- (Czech Republic) Marek Podlešák
- (Czech Republic) Robin Staněk

The following player received entry into the singles main draw as a special exempt:

- (Serbia) Marko Tepavac

The following player received entry into the singles main draw as an alternate:

- (Czech Republic) Marek Jaloviec

The following players received entry from the qualifying draw:

- (France) Maxime Chazal
- (Argentina) Juan Ignacio Galarza
- (Austria) Lenny Hampel
- (Austria) Jurij Rodionov

The following player received entry as a lucky loser:

- (Russia) Roman Safiullin

== Women's singles main draw entrants ==
=== Seeds ===
Country	Player	Rank^{1}	Seed
CZE	Markéta Vondroušová	76	1
NED	Richèl Hogenkamp	99	2
CZE	Denisa Allertová	106	3
RUS	Irina Khromacheva	122	4
ROU	Mihaela Buzărnescu	139	5
CZE	Lucie Hradecká	151	6
SLO	Dalila Jakupović	163	7
SVK	Rebecca Šramková	164	8

- ^{1} Rankings as of 17 July 2017.

=== Other entrants ===
The following players received a wildcard into the singles main draw:

- (Czech Republic) Miriam Kolodziejová
- (Czech Republic) Jesika Malečková
- (Czech Republic) Karolína Muchová
- (Ukraine) Dayana Yastremska

The following player received entry by a protected ranking:

- (Romania) Mihaela Buzărnescu

The following player received entry by a junior exempt:

- (Russia) Anastasia Potapova

The following players received entry from the qualifying draw:

- (Norway) Ulrikke Eikeri
- (Ukraine) Anhelina Kalinina
- (Italy) Camilla Rosatello
- (Spain) Olga Sáez Larra

The following players received entry as lucky losers:

- (Romania) Raluca Georgiana Șerban
- (Slovakia) Chantal Škamlová

== Champions ==
=== Men's singles ===
- (Slovakia) Andrej Martin def. (Germany) Yannick Maden 7–6^{(7–3)}, 6–3.

=== Women's singles ===
- (Czech Republic) Markéta Vondroušová def. (Czech Republic) Karolína Muchová, 7–5, 6–1

=== Men's doubles ===
- (Czech Republic) Jan Šátral / (Austria) Tristan-Samuel Weissborn def. (Germany) Gero Kretschmer / (Germany) Andreas Mies 6–3, 5–7, [10–3].

=== Women's doubles ===
- (Russia) Anastasia Potapova / (Ukraine) Dayana Yastremska def. (Romania) Mihaela Buzărnescu / (Ukraine) Alona Fomina, 6–2, 6–2
