= 2011 Strabag Prague Open – Women's singles =

Women's singles
- 2011 Strabag Prague Open

Final
- Champion: (Czech Republic) Lucie Hradecká
- Runner-up: (Argentina) Paula Ormaechea
- Score: 4–6, 6–3, 6–2

Details
- Draw: 32
- Seeds: 8

Events
Singles	men	women
Doubles	men	women
- Strabag Prague Open

The women's singles of the 2011 Strabag Prague Open tournament was played on clay in Prague, Czech Republic.

Ágnes Szávay was the defending champion but chose to compete in Madrid instead.
Lucie Hradecká won the title, defeating Paula Ormaechea 4–6, 6–3, 6–2 in the final.

== Seeds ==
1. (Czech Republic) Lucie Hradecká (champion)
2. (Italy) Romina Oprandi (semifinals)
3. (Czech Republic) Andrea Hlaváčková (first round)
4. (Austria) Patricia Mayr-Achleitner (quarterfinals)
5. (Austria) Yvonne Meusburger (semifinals)
6. (Japan) Misaki Doi (first round)
7. (Ukraine) Lesia Tsurenko (first round)
8. (Germany) Sabine Lisicki (second round)

== Draw ==
Key

- Q = Qualifier
- WC = Wild card
- LL = Lucky loser
- Alt = Alternate
- ITF = ITF entry
- PR = Protected ranking
- SR = Special ranking
- SE = Special exempt
- JE = Junior exempt
- JR = Junior Accelerator Programme entrant
- CO = College Accelerator Programme entrant
- NG = Next Gen Accelerator Program entrant
- w/o = Walkover
- r = Retired
- d = Defaulted

=== Finals ===
Semifinals
1	(Czech Republic) Lucie Hradecká	6	6
5	(Austria) Yvonne Meusburger	2	2
Q	(Argentina) Paula Ormaechea	1	7	7
2	(Italy) Romina Oprandi	6	5	6^{3}

Final
1	(Czech Republic) Lucie Hradecká	4	6	6
Q	(Argentina) Paula Ormaechea	6	3	2

=== Top half ===
First round
1	(Czech Republic) L Hradecká	6	4	6
(Belarus) D Kustova	0	6	3
WC	(Czech Republic) Ka Plíšková	6	2	6
(Slovenia) M Zec Peškirič	1	6	4
(Luxembourg) M Minella	6	6
WC	(Germany) G Focke	0	0
(Slovakia) K Kučová	0	0
8	(Germany) S Lisicki	6	6
4	(Austria) P Mayr-Achleitner	6	5	6
Q	(Slovakia) J Čepelová	4	7	1
Q	(Russia) A Rodionova	4	6	3
(Luxembourg) A Kremer	6	2	6
WC	(Czech Republic) Kr Plíšková	6^{3}	5
(Switzerland) S Vögele	7	7
WC	(Czech Republic) T Hejlová	4	1
5	(Austria) Y Meusburger	6	6

Second round
1	(Czech Republic) L Hradecká	6	6
WC	(Czech Republic) Ka Plíšková	0	2
(Luxembourg) M Minella	6	6
8	(Germany) S Lisicki	4	1
4	(Austria) P Mayr-Achleitner	6	6
(Luxembourg) A Kremer	0	1
(Switzerland) S Vögele	3	6	3
5	(Austria) Y Meusburger	6	3	6

Quarterfinals
1	(Czech Republic) L Hradecká	6	6
(Luxembourg) M Minella	2	3
4	(Austria) P Mayr-Achleitner	4	6	3
5	(Austria) Y Meusburger	6	1	6

Semifinals
1	(Czech Republic) L Hradecká	6	6
5	(Austria) Y Meusburger	2	2

=== Bottom half ===
First round
7	(Ukraine) L Tsurenko	2	6^{4}
(United States) M Brengle	6	7
Q	(Argentina) P Ormaechea	7	7
Q	(Slovakia) L Juríková	6^{1}	5
(Russia) E Ivanova	6	1^{r}
(Ukraine) O Savchuk	0	6
(Russia) R Kulikova	6	7
3	(Czech Republic) A Hlaváčková	3	6^{3}
6	(Japan) M Doi	6^{7}	6	1
(Italy) C Dentoni	7	3	6
(Netherlands) M Krajicek	6	6
LL	(Brazil) A-C Duarte	0	2
(Italy) A Floris	7	3	4
(Germany) K Wörle	5	6	6
(China) J Lu	3	5
2	(Italy) R Oprandi	6	7

Second round
(United States) M Brengle	6	3	2
Q	(Argentina) P Ormaechea	3	6	6
(Ukraine) O Savchuk	7	5	6
(Russia) R Kulikova	5	7	3
(Italy) C Dentoni	3	6^{1}
(Netherlands) M Krajicek	6	7
(Germany) K Wörle	4	2
2	(Italy) R Oprandi	6	6

Quarterfinals
Q	(Argentina) P Ormaechea	6	6
(Ukraine) O Savchuk	2	2
(Netherlands) M Krajicek	2	3
2	(Italy) R Oprandi	6	6

Semifinals
Q	(Argentina) P Ormaechea	1	7	7
2	(Italy) R Oprandi	6	5	6^{3}
