= 2017 Advantage Cars Prague Open – Women's singles =

Women's singles
- 2017 Advantage Cars Prague Open

Final
- Champion: (Czech Republic) Markéta Vondroušová
- Runner-up: (Czech Republic) Karolína Muchová
- Score: 7–5, 6–1

Events
Singles	men	women
Doubles	men	women
- Advantage Cars Prague Open

The women's singles of the 2017 Advantage Cars Prague Open tournament was played on clay in Prague, Czech Republic.

Antonia Lottner was the defending champion, but chose not to participate.

Markéta Vondroušová won the title, defeating Karolína Muchová in the final, 7–5, 6–1.

== Seeds ==
1. (Czech Republic) Markéta Vondroušová (champion)
2. (Netherlands) Richèl Hogenkamp (second round, withdrew)
3. (Czech Republic) Denisa Allertová (semifinals)
4. (Russia) Irina Khromacheva (second round)
5. (Romania) Mihaela Buzărnescu (first round)
6. (Czech Republic) Lucie Hradecká (first round)
7. (Slovenia) Dalila Jakupović (first round)
8. (Slovakia) Rebecca Šramková (first round)

== Draw ==
Key

- Q = Qualifier
- WC = Wild card
- LL = Lucky loser
- Alt = Alternate
- ITF = ITF entry
- PR = Protected ranking
- SR = Special ranking
- SE = Special exempt
- JE = Junior exempt
- JR = Junior Accelerator Programme entrant
- CO = College Accelerator Programme entrant
- NG = Next Gen Accelerator Program entrant
- w/o = Walkover
- r = Retired
- d = Defaulted

=== Finals ===
Semifinals
1	(Czech Republic) Markéta Vondroušová	6	4	6
3	(Czech Republic) Denisa Allertová	0	6	3
Q	(Italy) Camilla Rosatello	2	2
WC	(Czech Republic) Karolína Muchová	6	6

Final
1	(Czech Republic) Markéta Vondroušová	7	6
WC	(Czech Republic) Karolína Muchová	5	1

=== Top half ===
First round
1	(Czech Republic) M Vondroušová	6	6
(Czech Republic) T Smitková	2	2
LL	(Romania) RG Șerban	6^{5}	7^{7}	3
(Russia) A Komardina	7^{7}	6^{5}	6
(Czech Republic) P Krejsová	4	7^{7}	6
(Bulgaria) E Kostova	6	6^{2}	0
LL	(Slovakia) C Škamlová	6	6
7	(Slovenia) D Jakupović	3	1
3	(Czech Republic) D Allertová	7^{7}	6
(Poland) K Piter	6^{1}	4
(Switzerland) J Teichmann	2	4
(Turkey) Ç Büyükakçay	6	6
WC	(Czech Republic) J Malečková	3	4
WC	(Czech Republic) M Kolodziejová	6	6
Q	(Ukraine) A Kalinina	6	7^{7}
5/PR	(Romania) M Buzărnescu	2	6^{2}

Second round
1	(Czech Republic) M Vondroušová	6	6
(Russia) A Komardina	1	2
(Czech Republic) P Krejsová	2	2
LL	(Slovakia) C Škamlová	6	6
3	(Czech Republic) D Allertová	7	6
(Turkey) Ç Büyükakçay	5	2
WC	(Czech Republic) M Kolodziejová	3	1
Q	(Ukraine) A Kalinina	6	6

Quarterfinals
1	(Czech Republic) M Vondroušová	6	3	6
LL	(Slovakia) C Škamlová	3	6	3
3	(Czech Republic) D Allertová	6	6
Q	(Ukraine) A Kalinina	0	3

Semifinals
1	(Czech Republic) M Vondroušová	6	4	6
3	(Czech Republic) D Allertová	0	6	3

=== Bottom half ===
First round
8	(Slovakia) R Šramková	1	5
(Switzerland) A Sadiković	6	7
Q	(Spain) O Sáez Larra	3	1
Q	(Norway) U Eikeri	6	6
Q	(Italy) C Rosatello	7^{9}	4	6
(Georgia (country)) S Shapatava	6^{7}	6	0
(France) F Ferro	6	1	1
4	(Russia) I Khromacheva	2	6	6
6	(Czech Republic) L Hradecká	6	3	1
WC	(Ukraine) D Yastremska	2	6	6
(Russia) S Zhuk	6	3	6
(Slovakia) AK Schmiedlová	3	6	2
JE	(Russia) A Potapova	6^{4}	2
WC	(Czech Republic) K Muchová	7^{7}	6
(France) A Hesse	4	3
2	(Netherlands) R Hogenkamp	6	6

Second round
(Switzerland) A Sadiković	6	7^{11}
Q	(Norway) U Eikeri	3	6^{9}
Q	(Italy) C Rosatello	7^{12}	7
4	(Russia) I Khromacheva	6^{10}	5
WC	(Ukraine) D Yastremska	6	6
(Russia) S Zhuk	4	1
WC	(Czech Republic) K Muchová	w/o
2	(Netherlands) R Hogenkamp

Quarterfinals
(Switzerland) A Sadiković	6^{4}	7^{10}	2
Q	(Italy) C Rosatello	7^{7}	6^{8}	6
WC	(Ukraine) D Yastremska	6^{3}	1
WC	(Czech Republic) K Muchová	7^{7}	6

Semifinals
Q	(Italy) C Rosatello	2	2
WC	(Czech Republic) K Muchová	6	6
