= 2010 ECM Prague Open – Singles =

Singles
- 2010 ECM Prague Open

Final
- Champion: (Hungary) Ágnes Szávay
- Runner-up: (Czech Republic) Barbora Záhlavová-Strýcová
- Score: 6–2, 1–6, 6–2

Details
- Draw: 32
- Seeds: 8

Events
Singles	Doubles
- ECM Prague Open

The women's singles of the 2010 ECM Prague Open tournament was played on clay in Prague, Czech Republic.

Sybille Bammer was the defending champion, but chose not to participate.
Ágnes Szávay defeated Barbora Záhlavová-Strýcová in the final (6–2, 1–6, 6–2).

== Seeds ==
1. (Czech Republic) Lucie Šafářová (second round, withdrew due to hamstring muscle injury)
2. (Romania) Alexandra Dulgheru (second round, withdrew due to knee injury)
3. (Switzerland) Timea Bacsinszky (first round)
4. (Czech Republic) Klára Zakopalová (withdrew due to acute gastroenteritis)
5. (Spain) Anabel Medina Garrigues (quarterfinals)
6. (Argentina) Gisela Dulko (withdrew due to tonsillitis)
7. (Hungary) Ágnes Szávay (champion)
8. (Czech Republic) Barbora Záhlavová-Strýcová (final)

== Draw ==
Key

- Q = Qualifier
- WC = Wild card
- LL = Lucky loser
- Alt = Alternate
- ITF = ITF entry
- PR = Protected ranking
- SR = Special ranking
- SE = Special exempt
- JE = Junior exempt
- JR = Junior Accelerator Programme entrant
- CO = College Accelerator Programme entrant
- NG = Next Gen Accelerator Program entrant
- w/o = Walkover
- r = Retired
- d = Defaulted

=== Finals ===
Semifinals
8	(Czech Republic) Barbora Záhlavová-Strýcová	6	6
(Switzerland) Patty Schnyder	2	0
(Czech Republic) Lucie Hradecká	2	4
7	(Hungary) Ágnes Szávay	6	6

Final
8	(Czech Republic) Barbora Záhlavová-Strýcová	2	6	2
7	(Hungary) Ágnes Szávay	6	1	6

=== Top half ===
First round
1	(Czech Republic) L Šafářová	6	7
(Latvia) A Sevastova	4	5
(Sweden) J Larsson	6	6
WC	(Czech Republic) Ka Plíšková	4	4
(Russia) A Chakvetadze	2	3
Q	(Russia) K Pervak	6	6
(Czech Republic) A Hlaváčková	2	4
8	(Czech Republic) B Záhlavová-Strýcová	6	6
LL	(Austria) T Paszek	6^{4}	7	4
(France) A Cornet	7	6^{3}	6
(Switzerland) P Schnyder	6^{2}	6	6
WC	(Kazakhstan) Z Diyas	7	4	1
(Slovakia) M Rybáriková	6	5	5
(Georgia (country)) A Tatishvili	0	7	7
(Russia) A Lapushchenkova	5	0
LL	(Czech Republic) E Hrdinová	7	6

Second round
1	(Czech Republic) L Šafářová
(Sweden) J Larsson	w/o
Q	(Russia) K Pervak	6	4	2
8	(Czech Republic) B Záhlavová-Strýcová	2	6	6
(France) A Cornet	2	1
(Switzerland) P Schnyder	6	6
(Georgia (country)) A Tatishvili	6	6
LL	(Czech Republic) E Hrdinová	4	3

Quarterfinals
(Sweden) J Larsson	2	6	5
8	(Czech Republic) B Záhlavová-Strýcová	6	4	7
(Switzerland) P Schnyder	2	6	7
(Georgia (country)) A Tatishvili	6	2	5

Semifinals
8	(Czech Republic) B Záhlavová-Strýcová	6	6
(Switzerland) P Schnyder	2	0

=== Bottom half ===
First round
5	(Spain) A Medina Garrigues	6	6
WC	(Czech Republic) Kr Plíšková	1	3
(Czech Republic) S Záhlavová	6^{4}	2
Q	(Colombia) C Castaño	7	6
(Switzerland) S Vögele	6^{4}	2
(Czech Republic) L Hradecká	7	6
(Romania) M Niculescu	6	7
3	(Switzerland) T Bacsinszky	3	5
7	(Hungary) Á Szávay	6	6
Q	(Romania) L Ungur	4	3
Q	(Bosnia and Herzegovina) M Jugić-Salkić	4	7	2
(Czech Republic) I Benešová	6	6^{4}	6
(Germany) T Malek	4	2
(Slovenia) P Hercog	6	6
(Italy) T Garbin	4	6	2
2	(Romania) A Dulgheru	6	4	6

Second round
5	(Spain) A Medina Garrigues	6	6
Q	(Colombia) C Castaño	4	2
(Czech Republic) L Hradecká	6	6
(Romania) M Niculescu	2	1
7	(Hungary) Á Szávay	6	7
(Czech Republic) I Benešová	1	5
(Slovenia) P Hercog
2	(Romania) A Dulgheru	w/o

Quarterfinals
5	(Spain) A Medina Garrigues	4	5
(Czech Republic) L Hradecká	6	7
7	(Hungary) Á Szávay	6	6
(Slovenia) P Hercog	1	4

Semifinals
(Czech Republic) L Hradecká	2	4
7	(Hungary) Á Szávay	6	6
