= 2009 ECM Prague Open – Singles =

Singles
- 2009 ECM Prague Open

Final
- Champion: (Austria) Sybille Bammer
- Runner-up: (Italy) Francesca Schiavone
- Score: 7–6^{(7–4)}, 6–2

Details
- Draw: 32
- Seeds: 8

Events
Singles	Doubles
- ECM Prague Open

The women's singles of the 2009 ECM Prague Open tournament was played on clay in Prague, Czech Republic.

Vera Zvonareva was the defending champion, but was sidelined due to an ankle injury.

Sybille Bammer won in the final 7–6^{(7–4)}, 6–2 against Francesca Schiavone.

== Seeds ==
1. (Italy) Francesca Schiavone (final)
2. (Austria) Sybille Bammer (champion)
3. (Czech Republic) Iveta Benešová (semifinals)
4. (Spain) Carla Suárez Navarro (quarterfinals)
5. (Ukraine) Alona Bondarenko (first round)
6. (Slovakia) Magdaléna Rybáriková (first round)
7. (Czech Republic) Lucie Hradecká (quarterfinals)
8. (Czech Republic) Petra Kvitová (second round)

== Draw ==
Key

- Q = Qualifier
- WC = Wild card
- LL = Lucky loser
- Alt = Alternate
- ITF = ITF entry
- PR = Protected ranking
- SR = Special ranking
- SE = Special exempt
- JE = Junior exempt
- JR = Junior Accelerator Programme entrant
- CO = College Accelerator Programme entrant
- NG = Next Gen Accelerator Program entrant
- w/o = Walkover
- r = Retired
- d = Defaulted

=== Finals ===
Semifinals
1	(Italy) Francesca Schiavone	6	4	7
Q	(Switzerland) Timea Bacsinszky	2	6	5
3	(Czech Republic) Iveta Benešová	0	5
2	(Austria) Sybille Bammer	6	7

Final
1	(Italy) Francesca Schiavone	6^{4}	2
2	(Austria) Sybille Bammer	7	6

=== Top half ===
First round
1	(Italy) F Schiavone	7	6
(Israel) S Pe'er	5	3
(Czech Republic) K Zakopalová	5	4
(Slovenia) P Hercog	7	6
(Germany) K Barrois	5	6	7
(Romania) IR Olaru	7	1	5
(Ukraine) K Bondarenko	6	6
5	(Ukraine) A Bondarenko	1	3
4	(Spain) C Suárez Navarro	4	6	6
(Romania) A Dulgheru	6	3	3
(Czech Republic) B Záhlavová-Strýcová	7	6
WC	(Slovakia) K Kučová	5	4
(Switzerland) S Vögele	3	6	6
Q	(Croatia) P Martić	6	4	3
Q	(Switzerland) T Bacsinszky	6	7
6	(Slovakia) M Rybáriková	2	6^{5}

Second round
1	(Italy) F Schiavone	6	6
(Slovenia) P Hercog	2	2
(Germany) K Barrois	5	5
(Ukraine) K Bondarenko	7	7
4	(Spain) C Suárez Navarro	6	6
(Czech Republic) B Záhlavová-Strýcová	1	4
(Switzerland) S Vögele	4	1
Q	(Switzerland) T Bacsinszky	6	6

Quarterfinals
1	(Italy) F Schiavone	6	6
(Ukraine) K Bondarenko	1	1
4	(Spain) C Suárez Navarro	4	4
Q	(Switzerland) T Bacsinszky	6	6

Semifinals
1	(Italy) F Schiavone	6	4	7
Q	(Switzerland) T Bacsinszky	2	6	5

=== Bottom half ===
First round
8	(Czech Republic) P Kvitová	6	6
(Russia) A Lapushchenkova	1	0
Q	(France) K Mladenovic	4	1
WC	(Kazakhstan) Z Diyas	6	6
(Romania) M Niculescu	6	6
(United Kingdom) K O'Brien	3	2
WC	(Czech Republic) K Plíšková	7	1	3
3	(Czech Republic) I Benešová	6^{5}	6	6
7	(Czech Republic) L Hradecká	6	6
Q	(Russia) K Pervak	3	2
(Croatia) K Šprem	6	6
(Germany) T Malek	3	2
(Russia) A Kudryavtseva	7	6
(Czech Republic) N Vaidišová	5	2
(Bulgaria) T Pironkova	6	6^{2}	5
2	(Austria) S Bammer	2	7	7

Second round
8	(Czech Republic) P Kvitová	4	2
WC	(Kazakhstan) Z Diyas	6	6
(Romania) M Niculescu	5	4
3	(Czech Republic) I Benešová	7	6
7	(Czech Republic) L Hradecká	6	4	6
(Croatia) K Šprem	2	6	4
(Russia) A Kudryavtseva	1	1
2	(Austria) S Bammer	6	6

Quarterfinals
WC	(Kazakhstan) Z Diyas	4	1
3	(Czech Republic) I Benešová	6	6
7	(Czech Republic) L Hradecká	5	7	5
2	(Austria) S Bammer	7	5	7

Semifinals
3	(Czech Republic) I Benešová	0	5
2	(Austria) S Bammer	6	7
