= 2010 ECM Prague Open – Doubles =

Doubles
- 2010 ECM Prague Open

Final
- Champions: (Switzerland) Timea Bacsinszky (Italy) Tathiana Garbin
- Runners-up: (Romania) Monica Niculescu (Hungary) Ágnes Szávay
- Score: 7–5, 7–6^{(7–4)}

Details
- Draw: 16
- Seeds: 4

Events
Singles	Doubles
- ECM Prague Open

The women's doubles of the 2010 ECM Prague Open tournament was played on clay in Prague, Czech Republic.

Alona Bondarenko and Kateryna Bondarenko were the defending champions, but both chose not to participate.

Timea Bacsinszky and Tathiana Garbin won this year's event after a final victory over Monica Niculescu and Ágnes Szávay 7–5, 7–6^{(7–4)}.

== Seeds ==
1. (Czech Republic) Iveta Benešová / (Czech Republic) Barbora Záhlavová-Strýcová (first round)
2. (Czech Republic) Andrea Hlaváčková / (Czech Republic) Lucie Hradecká (quarterfinals)
3. (Romania) Monica Niculescu / (Hungary) Ágnes Szávay (final)
4. (Poland) Klaudia Jans / (Poland) Alicja Rosolska (semifinals)

== Draw ==
Key

- Q = Qualifier
- WC = Wild card
- LL = Lucky loser
- Alt = Alternate
- ITF = ITF entry
- PR = Protected ranking
- SR = Special ranking
- SE = Special exempt
- JE = Junior exempt
- JR = Junior Accelerator Programme entrant
- CO = College Accelerator Programme entrant
- NG = Next Gen Accelerator Program entrant
- w/o = Walkover
- r = Retired
- d = Defaulted

=== Draw ===
First round
1	(Czech Republic) I Benešová (Czech Republic) B Záhlavová-Strýcová	3	3
(Switzerland) T Bacsinszky (Italy) T Garbin	6	6
(Spain) A Medina Garrigues (Switzerland) P Schnyder	7	6
(Greece) E Daniilidou (Germany) J Wöhr	5	3
4	(Poland) K Jans (Poland) A Rosolska	6^{6}	6	[12]
WC	(Czech Republic) Ka Plíšková (Czech Republic) Kr Plíšková	7	4	[10]
(Sweden) J Larsson (Germany) T Malek	4	6	[10]
(Bosnia and Herzegovina) M Jugić-Salkić (Croatia) D Jurak	6	1	[4]
(Australia) An Rodionova (Russia) Ar Rodionova	2	7	[7]
(France) A Cornet (Slovakia) M Rybáriková	6	6^{6}	[10]
(New Zealand) M Erakovic (Poland) K Kosińska	2	2
3	(Romania) M Niculescu (Hungary) Á Szávay	6	6
(Belarus) E Dzehalevich (Belarus) T Poutchek	6	6
(Austria) S Klemenschits (Slovenia) A Klepač	2	2
WC	(Czech Republic) T Hejlová (Czech Republic) E Hrdinová	7	2	[7]
2	(Czech Republic) A Hlaváčková (Czech Republic) L Hradecká	5	6	[10]

Quarterfinals
(Switzerland) T Bacsinszky (Italy) T Garbin	6	6
(Spain) A Medina Garrigues (Switzerland) P Schnyder	1	2
4	(Poland) K Jans (Poland) A Rosolska
(Sweden) J Larsson (Germany) T Malek	w.o.
(France) A Cornet (Slovakia) M Rybáriková	3	4
3	(Romania) M Niculescu (Hungary) Á Szávay	6	6
(Belarus) E Dzehalevich (Belarus) T Poutchek	6	2	[10]
2	(Czech Republic) A Hlaváčková (Czech Republic) L Hradecká	4	6	[7]

Semifinals
(Switzerland) T Bacsinszky (Italy) T Garbin	6	7
4	(Poland) K Jans (Poland) A Rosolska	4	6^{4}
3	(Romania) M Niculescu (Hungary) Á Szávay	6	6
(Belarus) E Dzehalevich (Belarus) T Poutchek	2	3

Final
(Switzerland) T Bacsinszky (Italy) T Garbin	7	7
3	(Romania) M Niculescu (Hungary) Á Szávay	5	6^{4}
