= I.ČLTK Prague Open =

Annual tennis tournament held in Prague, Czech Republic

Prague Open
- 2026 Advantage Cars Prague Open

Tournament information
- Event name: Sekyra Group Prague Open by Advantage Cars (2026-), Advantage Cars Prague Open (2023-2025)
- Location: Prague, Czech Republic
- Venue: I. ČLTK Prague
- Category: Tier IV (1995, 1997, 2005–2008); Tier III (1998); WTA International (2009–2010)
- Surface: Clay / outdoors
- Website: pragueopen.net/

Current champions (2025)
- Men's singles: (Austria) Filip Misolic
- Women's singles: (United Kingdom) Francesca Jones
- Men's doubles: (Ukraine) Denys Molchanov (Czech Republic) Matěj Vocel
- Women's doubles: (Netherlands) Jasmijn Gimbrère (Czech Republic) Denisa Hindová
ATP Tour
- Category: ATP Challenger Tour
- Draw: 32S / 32Q / 16D
- Prize money: €91,250 (2025)
WTA Tour
- Category: ITF Women's Circuit
- Draw: 32S / 32Q / 16D
- Prize money: $60,000

The Prague Open (formerly Advantage Cars/I.ČLTK Prague Open) is a tennis tournament held in Prague, the capital of the Czech Republic. The tournament is part of the ATP Challenger Tour since 1991 (with an interruption in the years 2000, 2009–10) and the ITF Women's Circuit since 2011. The event is held at I. ČLTK Prague on Štvanice island. It was part of the WTA Tour from 1995 until 2010.

Jan Hernych is the singles record holder with three titles. Michal Tabara, Lukáš Rosol and Horacio Zeballos are the only three to win both singles and doubles in the same year.

== Tournament naming ==
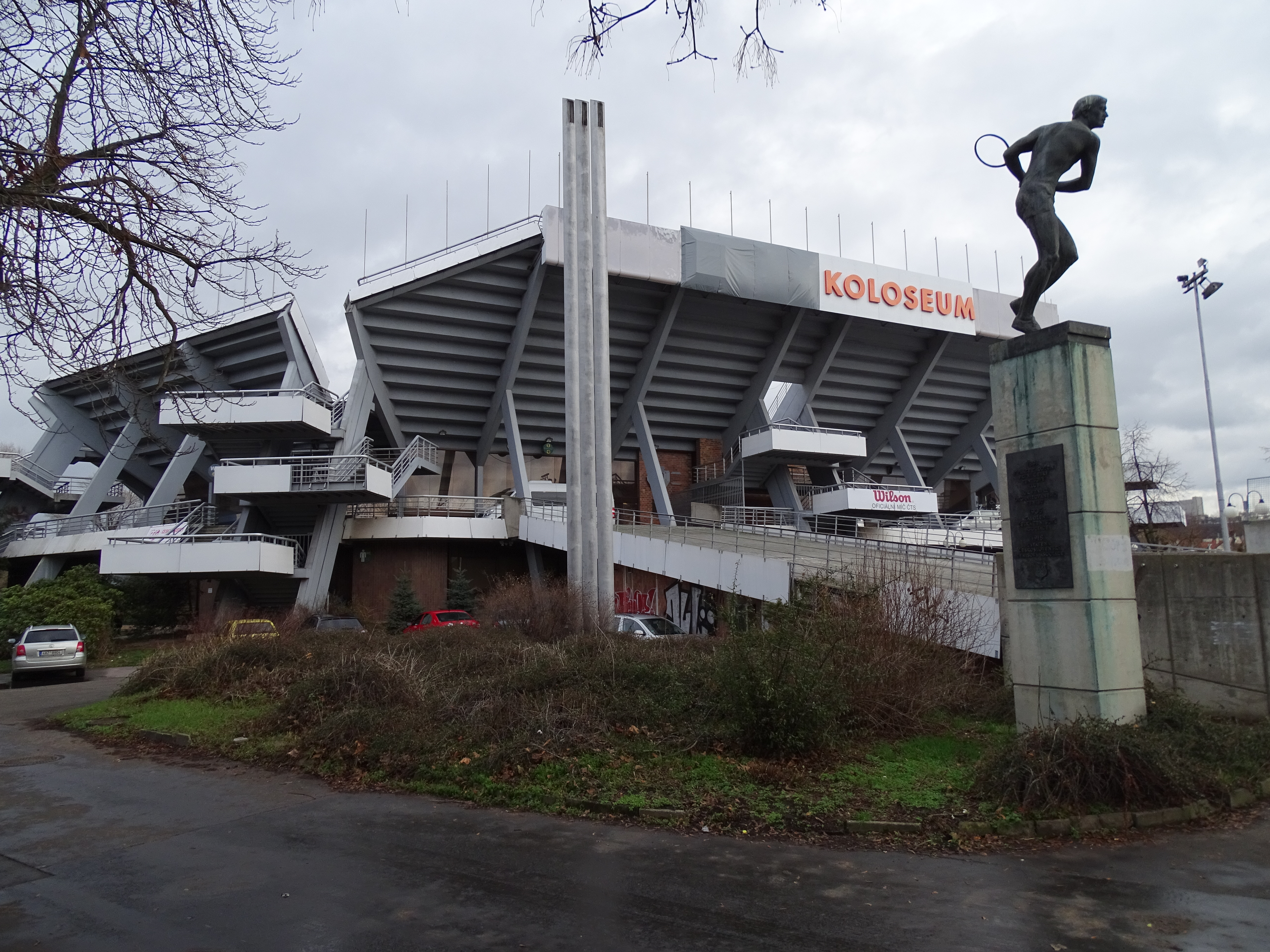
Exterior of Tennis arena Štvanice

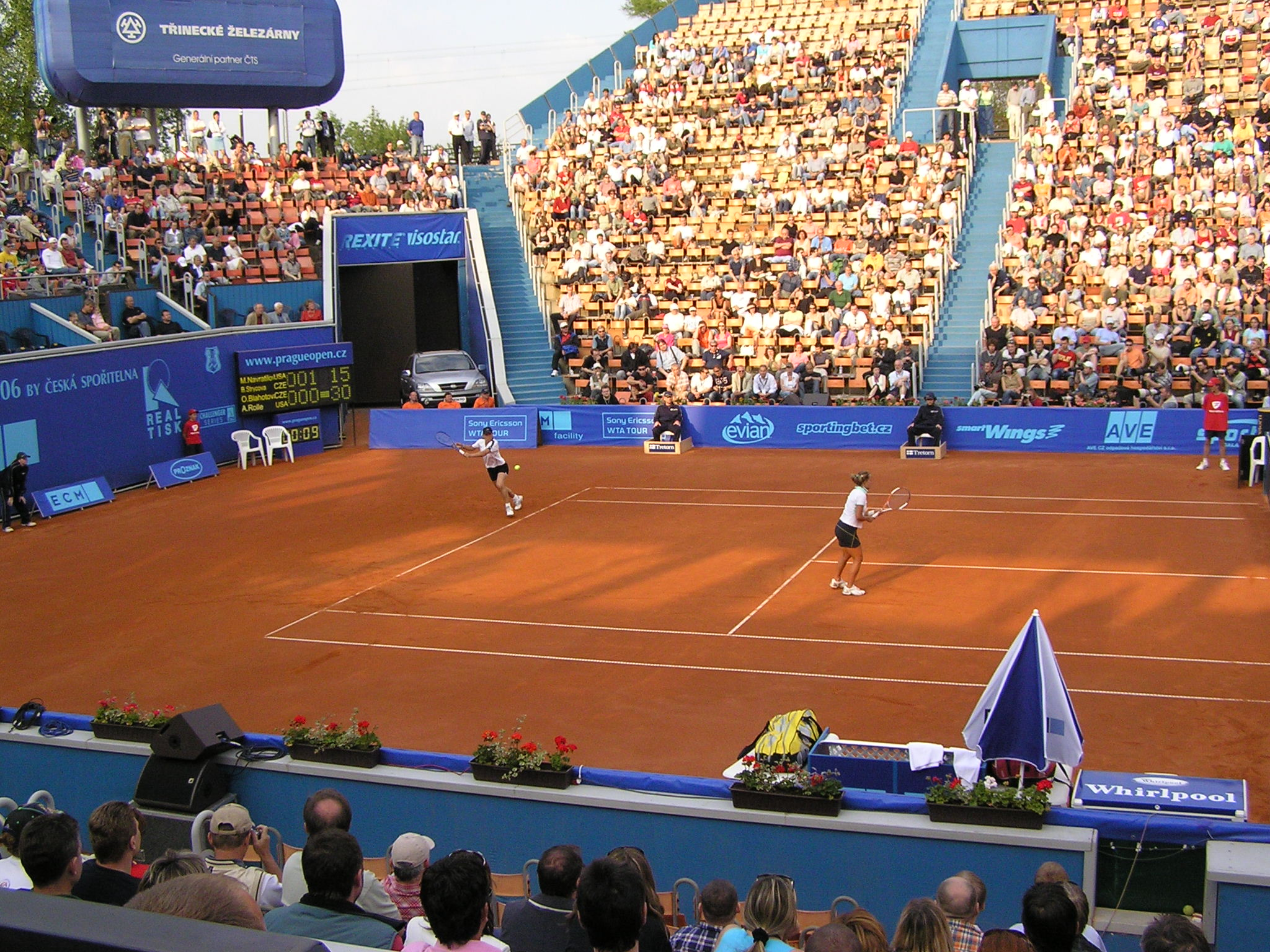
Martina Navratilova during 2006 ECM Prague Open, at Štvanice arena

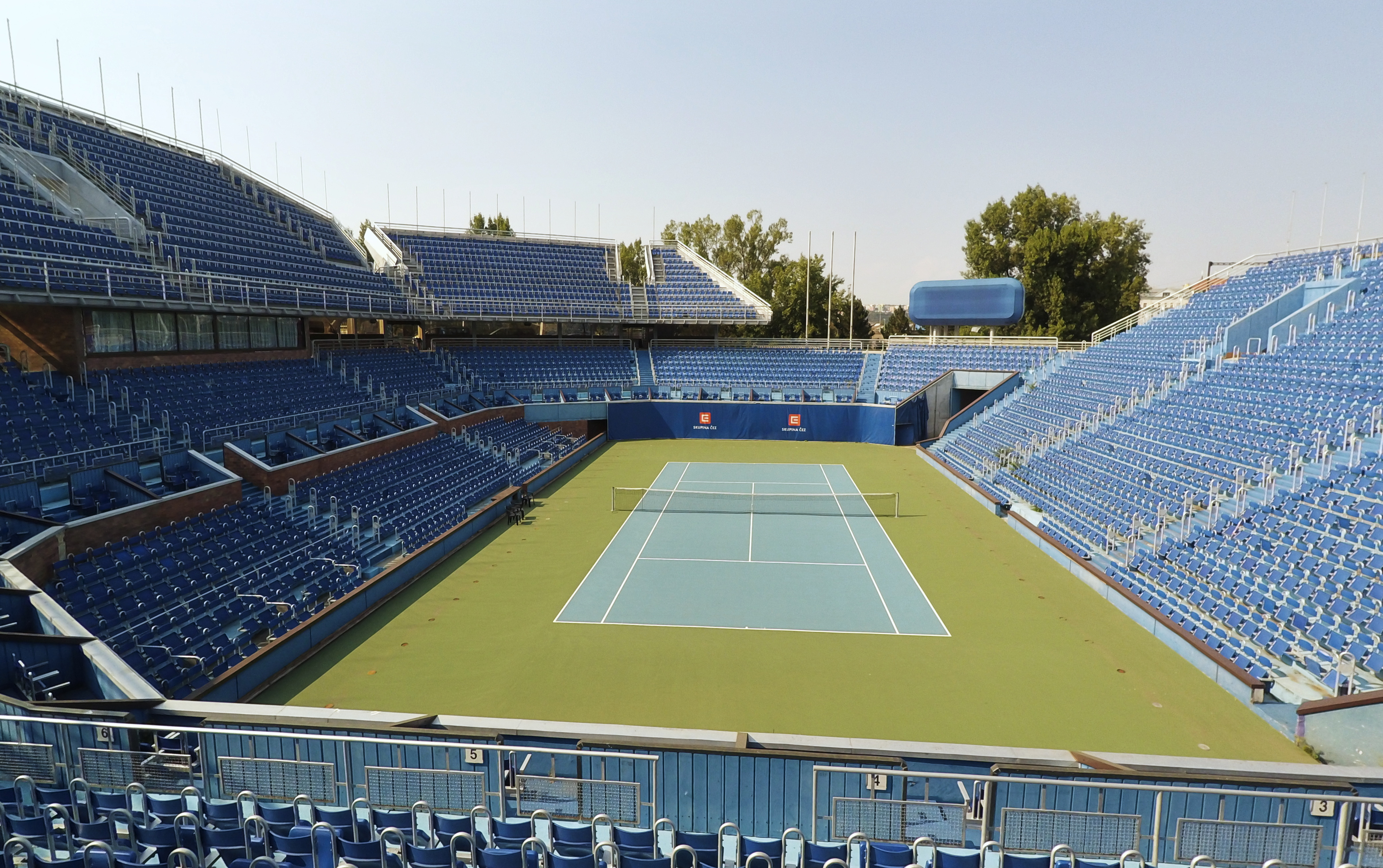
Interior of Tennis arena Štvanice, 2015

- 1991–1999: (Czech Open, Skoda Czech Open) women; (TBD) men
- 2001–2010: ECM Prague Open
- 2011: Strabag Prague Open
- 2012: CNGvitall Prague Open
- 2020–2022: I.ČLTK Prague Open
- 2013–2019; 2023–2025: Advantage Cars Prague Open
- 2026–: Sekyra Group Prague Open

== Past finals ==
=== Men ===
==== Singles ====
Year	Champion	Runner-up	Score
1991	(Czech Republic) Jan Kodeš Jr.	(Sweden) Thomas Enqvist	5–7, 6–4, 6–1
1992	(Slovakia) Karol Kučera	(Germany) Florian Krumrey	2–6, 6–4, 6–4
1993	(Austria) Gilbert Schaller	(Italy) Massimo Valeri	6–4, 7–6
1994	(Czech Republic) Jiří Novák	(Spain) Albert Portas	6–2, 7–5
1995	(Spain) Albert Portas (1)	(Morocco) Hicham Arazi	6–7, 6–4, 6–4
1996	(Spain) Galo Blanco	(Brazil) Gustavo Kuerten	6–1, 6–2
1997	(Spain) Albert Portas (2)	(Spain) Fernando Vicente	6–1, 6–4
1998	(Czech Republic) Michal Tabara (1)	(Austria) Wolfgang Schranz	6–2, 6–1
1999	(Czech Republic) Michal Tabara (2)	(Monaco) Jean-René Lisnard	6–4, 6–1
2000	Not held		
2001	(Czech Republic) Ctislav Doseděl	(Czech Republic) Jan Hernych	6–2, 4–6, 6–1
2002	(France) Olivier Patience	(Australia) Todd Larkham	4–6, 7–5, 6–3
2003	(Netherlands) Sjeng Schalken	(Spain) Albert Montañés	1–6, 6–1, 6–4
2004	(Czech Republic) Jan Hernych (1)	(Czech Republic) Ivo Minář	6–1, 6–4
2005	(Czech Republic) Jan Hernych (2)	(Czech Republic) Jiří Vaněk	3–6, 6–4, 6–3
2006	(Czech Republic) Robin Vik	(Czech Republic) Jan Hájek	6–4, 7–6^{(7–4)}
2007	(Czech Republic) Dušan Lojda	(Czech Republic) Jiří Vaněk	6–7^{(3–7)}, 6–2, 7–6^{(7–5)}
2008	(Czech Republic) Jan Hernych (3)	(Czech Republic) Lukáš Dlouhý	4–6, 6–2, 6–4
2009-2010	Not held		
2011	(Czech Republic) Lukáš Rosol (1)	(United States) Alex Bogomolov Jr.	7–6^{(7–1)}, 5–2 ret.
2012	(Argentina) Horacio Zeballos	(Slovakia) Martin Kližan	1–6, 6–4, 7–6^{(8–6)}
2013	(Ukraine) Oleksandr Nedovyesov	(Spain) Javier Martí	6–0, 6–1
2014	(Argentina) Diego Schwartzman	(Brazil) André Ghem	6–4, 7–5
2015	(Brazil) Rogério Dutra Silva	(Moldova) Radu Albot	6–2, 6–7^{(5–7)}, 6–4
2016	(Colombia) Santiago Giraldo	(Belarus) Uladzimir Ignatik	6–4, 3–6, 7–6^{(7–2)}
2017	(Slovakia) Andrej Martin	(Germany) Yannick Maden	7–6^{(7–3)}, 6–3
2018	(Czech Republic) Lukáš Rosol (2)	(Kazakhstan) Aleksandr Nedovyesov	4–6, 6–3, 6–4
2019	(Spain) Mario Vilella Martínez	(Chinese Taipei) Tseng Chun-hsin	6–4, 6–2
2020	(Switzerland) Stan Wawrinka	(Russia) Aslan Karatsev	7–6^{(7–2)}, 6–4
2021	(Netherlands) Tallon Griekspoor	(Germany) Oscar Otte	5–7, 6–4, 6–4
2022	(Argentina) Pedro Cachin	(Italy) Lorenzo Giustino	6–3, 7–6^{(7–4)}
2023	(Switzerland) Dominic Stricker	(Austria) Sebastian Ofner	7–6^{(9–7)}, 6–3
2024	(Czech Republic) Jiří Veselý	(Belgium) Gauthier Onclin	6–2, 3–6, 7–6^{(7–3)}
2025	(Austria) Filip Misolic	(Netherlands) Guy den Ouden	6–4, 6–0
2026	(Czech Republic) Jan Kumstát	(Chinese Taipei) Tseng Chun-hsin	5–7, 6–3, 6–0

==== Doubles ====
Year	Champions	Runners-up	Score
1991	(United States) Steve DeVries (Czech Republic) Richard Vogel	(Czech Republic) Martin Damm (Czech Republic) David Rikl	2–6, 6–1, 6–4
1992	(Czech Republic) Martin Damm (Czech Republic) David Rikl (1)	(Sweden) Johan Carlsson (Sweden) Niclas Kroon	6–2, 6–0
1993	(Czech Republic) David Rikl (2) (Czech Republic) Pavel Vízner	(Sweden) Tomas Nydahl (Sweden) Mikael Tillström	6–2, 7–6
1994	(Romania) Andrei Pavel (Germany) Alex Rădulescu	(Israel) Eyal Ran (New Zealand) Glenn Wilson	6–4, 6–2
1995	(Belgium) Filip Dewulf (Czech Republic) Vojtěch Flégl	(Czech Republic) Petr Pála (Czech Republic) David Škoch	6–7, 7–5, 6–2
1996	(United States) Donald Johnson (United States) Francisco Montana	(North Macedonia) Aleksandar Kitinov (Canada) Sébastien Leblanc	3–6, 6–3, 6–1
1997	(India) Mahesh Bhupathi (India) Leander Paes	(United States) Devin Bowen (Finland) Tuomas Ketola	6–4, 6–0
1998	(Spain) Joan Balcells (Socialist Federal Republic of Yugoslavia) Nenad Zimonjić	(Czech Republic) Jiří Novák (Czech Republic) Radek Štěpánek	7–6, 7–6
1999	(Czech Republic) Michal Tabara (Czech Republic) Radomír Vašek	(Czech Republic) Tomáš Cibulec (Czech Republic) Petr Pála	6–2, 6–0
2000	Not held		
2001	(Czech Republic) Jaroslav Levinský (Czech Republic) Michal Navrátil (1)	(Israel) Noam Behr (Israel) Andy Ram	6–3, 6–1
2002	(Czech Republic) František Čermák (1) (Czech Republic) Ota Fukárek	(Czech Republic) Jaroslav Levinský (Czech Republic) David Škoch	6–4, 6–3
2003	(Czech Republic) Tomáš Berdych (Czech Republic) Michal Navrátil (2)	(Argentina) Martín García (Argentina) Sebastián Prieto	6–4, 3–6, 6–4
2004	(Slovakia) Karol Kučera (Czech Republic) Cyril Suk	(Czech Republic) Martin Damm (Czech Republic) Dušan Karol	6–3, 6–7^{(5–7)}, 6–3
2005	(Australia) Jordan Kerr (1) (Argentina) Sebastián Prieto	(United States) Travis Parrott (Netherlands) Rogier Wassen	6–4, 6–3
2006	(Czech Republic) Petr Pála (1) (Czech Republic) David Škoch	(Paraguay) Ramón Delgado (Argentina) Sergio Roitman	6–0, 6–0
2007	(Czech Republic) Tomáš Cibulec (Australia) Jordan Kerr (2)	(Czech Republic) Leoš Friedl (Czech Republic) David Škoch	6–4, 6–2
2008	(Czech Republic) Lukáš Dlouhý (Czech Republic) Petr Pála (2)	(Czech Republic) Dušan Karol (Czech Republic) Jaroslav Pospíšil	6–7^{(2–7)}, 6–4, [10–6]
2009- 2010	Not held		
2011	(Czech Republic) František Čermák (2) (Czech Republic) Lukáš Rosol (1)	(Germany) Christopher Kas (Austria) Alexander Peya	6–3, 6–4
2012	(Czech Republic) Lukáš Rosol (2) (Argentina) Horacio Zeballos	(Slovakia) Martin Kližan (Slovakia) Igor Zelenay	7–5, 2–6, [12–10]
2013	(Chinese Taipei) Lee Hsin-han (Chinese Taipei) Peng Hsien-yin	(United States) Vahid Mirzadeh (United States) Denis Zivkovic	6–4, 4–6, [10–5]
2014	(Croatia) Toni Androić (Russia) Andrey Kuznetsov	(Venezuela) Roberto Maytín (Mexico) Miguel Ángel Reyes-Varela	7–5, 7–5
2015	(Netherlands) Wesley Koolhof (Netherlands) Matwé Middelkoop	(Belarus) Sergey Betov (Russia) Mikhail Elgin	6–4, 3–6, [10–7]
2016	(Austria) Julian Knowle (Slovakia) Igor Zelenay	(Argentina) Facundo Argüello (Chile) Julio Peralta	6–4, 7–5
2017	(Czech Republic) Jan Šátral (Austria) Tristan-Samuel Weissborn	(Germany) Gero Kretschmer (Germany) Andreas Mies	6–3, 5–7, [10–3]
2018	(Belgium) Sander Gillé (Belgium) Joran Vliegen	(Brazil) Fernando Romboli (Spain) David Vega Hernández	6–4, 6–2
2019	(Uruguay) Ariel Behar (Ecuador) Gonzalo Escobar	(Kazakhstan) Andrey Golubev (Kazakhstan) Aleksandr Nedovyesov	6–7^{(4–7)}, 7–5, [10–8]
2020	(France) Pierre-Hugues Herbert (France) Arthur Rinderknech	(Czech Republic) Zdeněk Kolář (Czech Republic) Lukáš Rosol	6–3, 6–4
2021	(Australia) Marc Polmans (Ukraine) Sergiy Stakhovsky	(Croatia) Ivan Sabanov (Croatia) Matej Sabanov	6–3, 6–4
2022	(Portugal) Nuno Borges (Portugal) Francisco Cabral	(Czech Republic) Andrew Paulson (Czech Republic) Adam Pavlásek	6–4, 6–7^{(3–7)}, [10–5]
2023	(Czech Republic) Petr Nouza (Czech Republic) Andrew Paulson	(Czech Republic) Jiří Barnat (Czech Republic) Jan Hrazdil	6–4, 6–3
2024	(Germany) Jakob Schnaitter (Germany) Mark Wallner	(Czech Republic) Jiří Barnat (Czech Republic) Jan Hrazdil	6–3, 6–1
2025	(Ukraine) Denys Molchanov (Czech Republic) Matěj Vocel	(Austria) David Pichler (Austria) Jurij Rodionov	7–6^{(7–3)}, 6–3
2026	(Czech Republic) Andrew Paulson (Belgium) Joran Vliegen	(Sweden) Erik Grevelius (Sweden) Adam Heinonen	6–4, 6–3

=== Women ===
==== Singles ====
Year	Champion	Runner-up	Score
1995	(France) Julie Halard	(Czech Republic) Ludmila Richterová	6–4, 6–4
1996	Not held		
1997	(South Africa) Joannette Kruger	(Austria) Marion Maruska	6–1, 6–1
1998	(Czech Republic) Jana Novotná	(France) Sandrine Testud	6–3, 6–0
1999- 2004	Not held		
2005	(Russia) Dinara Safina	(Czech Republic) Zuzana Ondrášková	7–6^{(7–2)}, 6–3
2006	(Israel) Shahar Pe'er	(Australia) Samantha Stosur	4–6, 6–2, 6–1
2007	(Japan) Akiko Morigami	(France) Marion Bartoli	6–1, 6–3
2008	(Russia) Vera Zvonareva	(Belarus) Victoria Azarenka	7–6^{(7–2)}, 6–2
2009	(Austria) Sybille Bammer	(Italy) Francesca Schiavone	7–6^{(7–4)}, 6–2
2010	(Hungary) Ágnes Szávay	(Czech Republic) Barbora Záhlavová-Strýcová	6–2, 1–6, 6–2
↓ ITF tournament ↓
2011	(Czech Republic) Lucie Hradecká	(Argentina) Paula Ormaechea	4–6, 6–3, 6–2
2012- 2014	Not held		
2015	(Spain) María Teresa Torró Flor	(Czech Republic) Denisa Allertová	6–3, 7–6^{(7–5)}
2016	(Germany) Antonia Lottner	(Germany) Carina Witthöft	7–6^{(8–6)}, 1–6, 7–5
2017	(Czech Republic) Markéta Vondroušová	(Czech Republic) Karolína Muchová	7–5, 6–1
2018	(Netherlands) Richèl Hogenkamp	(Italy) Martina Di Giuseppe	6–4, 6–2
2019	(Germany) Tamara Korpatsch	(Czech Republic) Denisa Allertová	7–5, 6–3
2020	Not held		
2021	(Germany) Jule Niemeier	(Hungary) Dalma Gálfi	6–4, 6–2
2022	(Poland) Maja Chwalińska	(Georgia (country)) Ekaterine Gorgodze	7–5, 6–3
2023	(Latvia) Darja Semeņistaja	(Spain) Jéssica Bouzas Maneiro	2–6, 6–3, 6–4
2024	(Czech Republic) Dominika Šalková	(Poland) Maja Chwalińska	6–3, 6–0
2025	(United Kingdom) Francesca Jones	(Japan) Ena Shibahara	6–3, 6–4
2026	(Czech Republic) Jana Kovačková	(China) Gao Xinyu	6–1, 6–1

==== Doubles ====
Year	Champion	Runner-up	Score
1995	(United States) Chanda Rubin (United States) Linda Wild	(Sweden) Maria Lindström (Sweden) Maria Strandlund	6–7^{(3–7)}, 6–3, 6–2
1996	Not held		
1997	(Romania) Ruxandra Dragomir (Slovakia) Karina Habšudová (1)	(Czech Republic) Eva Martincová (Czech Republic) Helena Vildová	6–1, 5–7, 6–2
1998	(Italy) Silvia Farina Elia (Slovakia) Karina Habšudová (2)	(Czech Republic) Květa Peschke (Czech Republic) Michaela Paštiková	2–6, 6–1, 6–2
1999- 2004	Not held		
2005	(France) Émilie Loit (Australia) Nicole Pratt	(Czech Republic) Barbora Strýcová (Croatia) Jelena Kostanić	6–7^{(6–8)}, 6–4, 6–4
2006	(France) Marion Bartoli (Israel) Shahar Pe'er	(United States) Ashley Harkleroad (United States) Bethanie Mattek	6–4, 6–4
2007	(Czech Republic) Petra Cetkovská (Czech Republic) Andrea Hlaváčková (1)	(China) Ji Chunmei (China) Sun Shengnan	7–6^{(7–9)}, 6–2
2008	(Czech Republic) Andrea Hlaváčková (2) (Czech Republic) Lucie Hradecká	(United States) Jill Craybas (Netherlands) Michaëlla Krajicek	1–6, 6–3, [10–6]
2009	(Ukraine) Alona Bondarenko (Ukraine) Kateryna Bondarenko	(Czech Republic) Iveta Benešová (Czech Republic) Barbora Záhlavová-Strýcová	6–1, 6–2
2010	(Switzerland) Timea Bacsinszky (Italy) Tathiana Garbin	(Romania) Monica Niculescu (Hungary) Ágnes Szávay	7–5, 7–6^{(7–4)}
↓ ITF tournament ↓
2011	(Belarus) Darya Kustova (Russia) Arina Rodionova	(Ukraine) Olga Savchuk (Ukraine) Lesia Tsurenko	2–6, 6–1, [10–7]
2012- 2014	Not held		
2015	(Czech Republic) Kateřina Kramperová (United States) Bernarda Pera	(Czech Republic) Miriam Kolodziejová (Czech Republic) Markéta Vondroušová	7–6^{(7–4)}, 5–7, [10–1]
2016	(Netherlands) Demi Schuurs (Czech Republic) Renata Voráčová	(Spain) Sílvia Soler Espinosa (Spain) Sara Sorribes Tormo	7–5, 3–6, [10–4]
2017	(Russia) Anastasia Potapova (Ukraine) Dayana Yastremska	(Romania) Mihaela Buzărnescu (Ukraine) Alona Fomina	6–2, 6–2
2018	(Sweden) Cornelia Lister (Serbia) Nina Stojanović	(Netherlands) Bibiane Schoofs (Belgium) Kimberley Zimmermann	6–2, 2–6, [10–8]
2019	(Romania) Nicoleta Dascălu (Cyprus) Raluca Șerban	(Czech Republic) Lucie Hradecká (Czech Republic) Johana Marková	6–4, 6–4
2020	Not held		
2021	(Hungary) Anna Bondár (Belgium) Kimberley Zimmermann	(Switzerland) Xenia Knoll (Romania) Elena-Gabriela Ruse	7–6^{(7–5)}, 6–2
2022	(Chile) Bárbara Gatica (Brazil) Rebeca Pereira	(Czech Republic) Miriam Kolodziejová (Czech Republic) Jesika Malečková	6–4, 6–2
2023	(Poland) Maja Chwalińska (Czech Republic) Jesika Malečková	(Czech Republic) Aneta Kučmová (Australia) Kaylah McPhee	6–0, 7–6^{(7–5)}
2024	(Australia) Jaimee Fourlis (Czech Republic) Dominika Šalková	(Germany) Noma Noha Akugue (Germany) Ella Seidel	5–7, 7–5, [10–4]
2025	(Netherlands) Jasmijn Gimbrère (Czech Republic) Denisa Hindová	(Czech Republic) Aneta Kučmová (Greece) Sapfo Sakellaridi	7–6^{(7–5)}, 7–5
2026	(Czech Republic) Alena Kovačková (Czech Republic) Jana Kovačková	(Ukraine) Valeriya Strakhova; Anastasia Tikhonova	6–2, 6–3

== See also ==
- Prague Open (1987–1999)
- 1992 HTC Prague Open
- BVV Prague Open
- 1996 Pupp Czech Open
- Sparta Prague Open Challenger
- Neridé Prague Indoor
- Czech Indoor Open
- WTA Prague Open
- List of tennis tournaments
