= 2009 Trofeo Bellaveglia – Doubles =

Doubles
- 2009 Trofeo Bellaveglia

Final
- Champions: (Italy) Paolo Lorenzi (Italy) Giancarlo Petrazzuolo
- Runners-up: (Italy) Alessio di Mauro (Italy) Manuel Jorquera
- Score: 7–6(5), 3–6, [10–6]

Events
Singles	Doubles
← 2008 ·	Trofeo Bellaveglia	· 2010 →

Paolo Lorenzi and Giancarlo Petrazzuolo won in the final 7–6(5), 3–6, [10–6], against Alessio di Mauro and Manuel Jorquera.

== Seeds ==
1. (Czech Republic) Dušan Karol / (Romania) Florin Mergea (first round)
2. (Spain) Pablo Andújar / (Spain) Daniel Muñoz-de la Nava (quarterfinals, withdrew)
3. (Italy) Daniele Bracciali / (Italy) Gianluca Naso (first round)
4. (Spain) Pere Riba / (Spain) Pablo Santos (quarterfinals)

== Draw ==
=== Key ===
- Q = Qualifier
- WC = Wild card
- LL = Lucky loser
- Alt = Alternate
- SE = Special exempt
- PR = Protected ranking
- ITF = ITF entry
- JE = Junior exempt
- w/o = Walkover
- r = Retired
- d = Defaulted
- SR = Special ranking

=== Draw ===
First round
1	(Czech Republic) D Karol (Romania) F Mergea	2	0
(Netherlands) J Huta Galung (Portugal) R Machado	6	6
(Slovakia) D Hrbatý (Czech Republic) L Rosol	6	3	[10]
(Belgium) O Rochus (France) A Sidorenko	3	6	[8]
4	(Spain) P Riba (Spain) P Santos	6	6
(Argentina) S Decoud (Argentina) L Migani	1	2
WC	(Italy) A di Mauro (Italy) M Jorquera	6	6
(Czech Republic) P Šnobel (Czech Republic) J Vaněk	4	3
(Italy) T Fabbiano (Italy) T Tenconi	3	2
(Italy) P Lorenzi (Italy) G Petrazzuolo	6	6
WC	(Morocco) R Chaki (Republic of Ireland) L Sorensen	6^{3}	6	[12]
3	(Italy) D Bracciali (Italy) G Naso	7	4	[10]
WC	(Italy) F Gaio (Russia) A Kuznetsov	6^{1}	6	[10]
(Italy) R Bautista-Agut (Spain) D Marrero	7	1	[6]
(Serbia) B Pašanski (Russia) D Sitak	5	2
2	(Spain) P Andújar (Spain) D Muñoz-de la Nava	6	7

Quarterfinals
(Netherlands) J Huta Galung (Portugal) R Machado	2	2
(Slovakia) D Hrbatý (Czech Republic) L Rosol	6	6
4	(Spain) P Riba (Spain) P Santos	3	2
WC	(Italy) A di Mauro (Italy) M Jorquera	6	6
(Italy) P Lorenzi (Italy) G Petrazzuolo	6	6
WC	(Morocco) R Chaki (Republic of Ireland) L Sorensen	4	4
WC	(Italy) F Gaio (Russia) A Kuznetsov
2	(Spain) P Andújar (Spain) D Muñoz-de la Nava	w/o

Semifinals
(Slovakia) D Hrbatý (Czech Republic) L Rosol	w/o
WC	(Italy) A di Mauro (Italy) M Jorquera
(Italy) P Lorenzi (Italy) G Petrazzuolo	7	7
WC	(Italy) F Gaio (Russia) A Kuznetsov	5	6^{3}

Finals
WC	(Italy) A di Mauro (Italy) M Jorquera	6^{5}	6	[6]
(Italy) P Lorenzi (Italy) G Petrazzuolo	7	3	[10]
