= 2010 Trofeo Bellaveglia – Singles =

Singles
- 2010 Trofeo Bellaveglia

Final
- Champion: (Spain) Pablo Andújar
- Runner-up: (France) Édouard Roger-Vasselin
- Score: 6–4, 6–3

Events
Singles	Doubles
← 2009 ·	Trofeo Bellaveglia	· 2011 →

Alexandr Dolgopolov was the defending champion, but he chose to compete in 2010 International German Open instead.
Pablo Andújar won the tournament, beating Édouard Roger-Vasselin 6–4, 6–3 in the final.

== Seeds ==
1. (Argentina) Carlos Berlocq (second round)
2. (Italy) Filippo Volandri (withdrew due to fever)
3. (Italy) Paolo Lorenzi (quarterfinals)
4. (Austria) Martin Fischer (second round)
5. (Spain) Pablo Andújar (champion)
6. (France) Édouard Roger-Vasselin (final)
7. (Romania) Adrian Ungur (semifinals)
8. (Argentina) Federico del Bonis (first round)

== Draw ==
=== Key ===
- Q = Qualifier
- WC = Wild card
- LL = Lucky loser
- Alt = Alternate
- SE = Special exempt
- PR = Protected ranking
- ITF = ITF entry
- JE = Junior exempt
- w/o = Walkover
- r = Retired
- d = Defaulted
- SR = Special ranking

=== Finals ===
Semifinals
7	(Romania) Adrian Ungur	3	6^{1}
5	(Spain) Pablo Andújar	6	7
(Russia) Evgeny Donskoy	6^{2}	2
6	(France) Édouard Roger-Vasselin	7	6

Final
5	(Spain) Pablo Andújar	6	6
6	(France) Édouard Roger-Vasselin	4	3

=== Top half ===
First round
1	(Argentina) C Berlocq	6	6
(Italy) A di Mauro	1	1
(Australia) S Kadir	6	3	2
(Argentina) J-M Aranguren	3	6	6
(Italy) M Crugnola	6	6
Q	(Belgium) J Dubail	4	2
(Croatia) N Mektić	4	1
7	(Romania) A Ungur	6	6
3	(Italy) P Lorenzi	1	6	6
(Republic of Ireland) L Sorensen	6	2	1
(Italy) M Trevisan	6
WC	(Italy) G Di Meo	3	r
(Argentina) JP Brzezicki	3	4
Q	(France) C Reix	6	6
(Sweden) F Prpic	4	2
5	(Spain) P Andújar	6	6

Second round
1	(Argentina) C Berlocq	3	6	4
(Argentina) J-M Aranguren	6	0	6
(Italy) M Crugnola	3	2
7	(Romania) A Ungur	6	6
3	(Italy) P Lorenzi	6	3	6
(Italy) M Trevisan	2	6	3
Q	(France) C Reix	2	2
5	(Spain) P Andújar	6	6

Quarterfinals
(Argentina) J-M Aranguren	3	4
7	(Romania) A Ungur	6	6
3	(Italy) P Lorenzi	3	6^{4}
5	(Spain) P Andújar	6	7

Semifinals
7	(Romania) A Ungur	3	6^{1}
5	(Spain) P Andújar	6	7

=== Bottom half ===
First round
8	(Argentina) F del Bonis	5	6^{5}
(Russia) E Donskoy	7	7
(Italy) F Cipolla	2	5
(Austria) A Haider-Maurer	6	7
WC	(Italy) F Gaio	1	4
(Netherlands) R Haase	6	6
(France) A Sidorenko	4	r
4	(Austria) M Fischer	6
6	(France) É Roger-Vasselin	4	6	6
WC	(Italy) T Fabbiano	6	4	4
Q	(Sweden) E Eleskovic	3	5
(Slovenia) B Kavčič	6	7
Q	(France) T Cazes-Carrère	4	2
WC	(Italy) G Naso	6	6
(Morocco) R El Amrani	3	6^{1}
LL	(Italy) F Piccari	6	7

Second round
(Russia) E Donskoy	6	1	6
(Austria) A Haider-Maurer	4	6	3
(Netherlands) R Haase	6	6
4	(Austria) M Fischer	4	3
6	(France) É Roger-Vasselin	6	6
(Slovenia) B Kavčič	2	4
WC	(Italy) G Naso	7	6
LL	(Italy) F Piccari	6^{3}	3

Quarterfinals
(Russia) E Donskoy	3	7	6
(Netherlands) R Haase	6	5	3
6	(France) É Roger-Vasselin	6	7
WC	(Italy) G Naso	2	6^{6}

Semifinals
(Russia) E Donskoy	6^{2}	2
6	(France) É Roger-Vasselin	7	6
