= 2011 Orbetello Challenger – Singles =

Singles
- 2011 Orbetello Challenger

Final
- Champion: (Italy) Filippo Volandri
- Runner-up: (Italy) Matteo Viola
- Score: 4–6, 6–3, 6–2

Events
Singles	Doubles
← 2010 ·	Orbetello Challenger	· 2012 →

Pablo Andújar was the defending champion, but decided not to participate.
1st seed Filippo Volandri defeated Matteo Viola 4–6, 6–3, 6–2 in the final to win the tournament.

== Seeds ==
1. (Italy) Filippo Volandri (champion)
2. (Netherlands) Thiemo de Bakker (quarterfinals)
3. (Argentina) Diego Junqueira (first round)
4. (Germany) Mischa Zverev (first round)
5. (Italy) Paolo Lorenzi (quarterfinals)
6. (France) Édouard Roger-Vasselin (semifinals)
7. (France) Benoît Paire (quarterfinals)
8. (France) Florent Serra (quarterfinals)

== Draw ==
=== Key ===
- Q = Qualifier
- WC = Wild card
- LL = Lucky loser
- Alt = Alternate
- SE = Special exempt
- PR = Protected ranking
- ITF = ITF entry
- JE = Junior exempt
- w/o = Walkover
- r = Retired
- d = Defaulted
- SR = Special ranking

=== Final four ===
Semifinals
1/WC	(Italy) Filippo Volandri	6	6
(France) Romain Jouan	1	4
(Italy) Matteo Viola	6	2	6
(France) Édouard Roger-Vasselin	3	6	4

Final
1/WC	(Italy) Filippo Volandri	4	6	6
(Italy) Matteo Viola	6	3	2

=== Top half ===
First round
1/WC	(Italy) F Volandri	6	6
(Italy) A di Mauro	3	4
Q	(Belgium) M Authom	3	4
(Belgium) D Goffin	6	6
WC	(Italy) M Trevisan	4	6	7
WC	(Italy) Marco Cecchinato	6	1	5
(Argentina) L Mayer	6	6^{5}	1
7	(France) B Paire	2	7^{7}	6
4	(Germany) M Zverev	6^{1}	1
(Italy) S Vagnozzi	7^{7}	6
(France) J Eysseric	2	2
(France) R Jouan	6	6
Q	(Spain) I Cervantes-Huegun	6	6
Q	(Austria) M Raditschnigg	4	3
(Argentina) F Delbonis	6	2	1
5	(Italy) P Lorenzi	3	6	6

Second round
1/WC	(Italy) F Volandri	6	7
(Belgium) D Goffin	3	5
WC	(Italy) M Trevisan	6^{1}	2
7	(France) B Paire	7	6
(Italy) S Vagnozzi	3	6	4
(France) R Jouan	6	1	6
Q	(Spain) I Cervantes-Huegun	6^{1}	5
5	(Italy) P Lorenzi	7^{7}	7

Quarterfinals
1/WC	(Italy) F Volandri	6	6
7	(France) B Paire	4	4
(France) R Jouan	6	6
5	(Italy) P Lorenzi	1	4

Semifinals
1/WC	(Italy) F Volandri	6	6
(France) R Jouan	1	4

=== Bottom half ===
First round
8	(France) F Serra	6	6
(France) D Guez	3	2
(Spain) J Martí	6^{6}	1
Alt	(Italy) G Naso	7^{8}	6
(Italy) M Viola	6	6
(Russia) E Donskoy	2	3
(Germany) D Brands	6	7^{7}
3	(Argentina) D Junqueira	4	6^{3}
6	(France) É Roger-Vasselin	3	6	6
(Hungary) A Balázs	6	2	2
Q	(Monaco) B Balleret	2	6	7
(Monaco) J-R Lisnard	6	4	5
LL	(Spain) G Granollers	6	6^{4}	2
(Croatia) K Mesaroš	4	7^{7}	6
(Austria) M Fischer	6	3	4
2/WC	(Netherlands) T de Bakker	4	6	6

Second round
8	(France) F Serra	7^{9}	2	7
Alt	(Italy) G Naso	6^{7}	6	5
(Italy) M Viola	6	3	7
(Germany) D Brands	3	6	5
6	(France) É Roger-Vasselin	6	6
Q	(Monaco) B Balleret	1	2
(Croatia) K Mesaroš	6^{6}	3
2/WC	(Netherlands) T de Bakker	7^{8}	6

Quarterfinals
8	(France) F Serra	3	1
(Italy) M Viola	6	6
6	(France) É Roger-Vasselin	6	6
2/WC	(Netherlands) T de Bakker	4	0

Semifinals
(Italy) M Viola	6	2	6
6	(France) É Roger-Vasselin	3	6	4
