= 2009 Trofeo Bellaveglia =

Tennis tournament in Orbetello, Italy

- Date: July 20 – July 26
- Edition: 1st
- Location: Orbetello, Italy

Champions

Singles
- (Ukraine) Oleksandr Dolgopolov Jr.

Doubles
- (Italy) Paolo Lorenzi / (Italy) Giancarlo Petrazzuolo
Trofeo Bellaveglia	· 2010 →

The 2009 Trofeo Bellaveglia was a professional tennis tournament played on outdoor red clay courts. This was the first edition of the tournament which was part of the 2009 ATP Challenger Tour. It took place in Orbetello, Italy between 20 July and 26 July 2009.

== Singles entrants ==
=== Seeds ===
Nationality	Player	Ranking*	Seeding
BEL	Olivier Rochus	87	1
POR	Rui Machado	114	2
ESP	Pablo Andújar	136	3
ALG	Lamine Ouahab	143	4
ARG	Sebastián Decoud	144	5
ESP	Pere Riba	145	6
ITA	Paolo Lorenzi	147	7
SVK	Dominik Hrbatý	152	8

- Rankings are as of July 13, 2009.

=== Other entrants ===
The following players received wildcards into the singles main draw:

- (Italy) Thomas Fabbiano
- (Italy) Federico Gaio
- (Russia) Andrey Kuznetsov
- (Italy) Gianluca Naso

The following players received a special exempt into the main draw:

- (Italy) Daniele Bracciali
- (Ukraine) Oleksandr Dolgopolov Jr.

The following players received entry from the qualifying draw:

- (Italy) Manuel Jorquera
- (Republic of Ireland) Louk Sorensen
- (Portugal) João Sousa
- (Romania) Adrian Ungur

== Champions ==
=== Singles ===
(Ukraine) Oleksandr Dolgopolov Jr. def. (Spain) Pablo Andújar, 6–4, 6–2

=== Doubles ===
(Italy) Paolo Lorenzi / (Italy) Giancarlo Petrazzuolo def. (Italy) Alessio di Mauro / (Italy) Manuel Jorquera, 7–6(5), 3–6, [10–6]
