= 2010 Trofeo Bellaveglia – Doubles =

Doubles
- 2010 Trofeo Bellaveglia

Final
- Champions: (Italy) Alessio di Mauro (Italy) Alessandro Motti
- Runners-up: (Croatia) Nikola Mektić (Croatia) Ivan Zovko
- Score: 6–2, 3–6, [10–3]

Events
Singles	Doubles
← 2009 ·	Trofeo Bellaveglia	· 2011 →

Paolo Lorenzi and Giancarlo Petrazzuolo were the defending champions, but they decided not to participate this year.
Alessio di Mauro and Alessandro Motti won the doubles title, defeating Nikola Mektić and Ivan Zovko in the finals, 6–2, 3–6, [10–3].

== Seeds ==
1. (France) Édouard Roger-Vasselin / (France) Alexandre Sidorenko (quarterfinals)
2. (Italy) Alessio di Mauro / (Italy) Alessandro Motti (champions)
3. (Croatia) Nikola Mektić / (Croatia) Ivan Zovko (finals)
4. (Italy) Flavio Cipolla / (Italy) Federico Gaio (semifinals)

== Draw ==
=== Key ===
- Q = Qualifier
- WC = Wild card
- LL = Lucky loser
- Alt = Alternate
- SE = Special exempt
- PR = Protected ranking
- ITF = ITF entry
- JE = Junior exempt
- w/o = Walkover
- r = Retired
- d = Defaulted
- SR = Special ranking

=== Draw ===
First round
(Belgium) J Dubail (France) A Tassart	2	2
(Argentina) J-M Aranguren (Italy) G Naso	6	6
(France) T Cazes-Carrère (France) C Reix	6	7
(Italy) A Piccari (Italy) F Piccari	4	5
(Russia) E Donskoy (Italy) T Fabbiano	5	6	[10]
(Italy) M Crugnola (Italy) S Ianni	7	3	[8]
WC	(Spain) P Andújar (Spain) P García-Gaitán	7	6^{12}	[9]
4	(Italy) F Cipolla (Italy) F Gaio	6^{5}	7	[11]
(Italy) C Brandi (Italy) S Valenti	6	6
(Morocco) R El Amrani (Netherlands) S Groen	2	1

Quarterfinals
1	(France) É Roger-Vasselin (France) A Sidorenko	7	4	[4]
(Argentina) J-M Aranguren (Italy) G Naso	5	6	[10]
3	(Croatia) N Mektić (Croatia) I Zovko	7	6
(France) T Cazes-Carrère (France) C Reix	6^{7}	1
(Russia) E Donskoy (Italy) T Fabbiano	6	4	[7]
4	(Italy) F Cipolla (Italy) F Gaio	4	6	[10]
(Italy) C Brandi (Italy) S Valenti	3	3
2	(Italy) A di Mauro (Italy) A Motti	6	6

Semifinals
(Argentina) J-M Aranguren (Italy) G Naso	3	1
3	(Croatia) N Mektić (Croatia) I Zovko	6	6
4	(Italy) F Cipolla (Italy) F Gaio	2	4
2	(Italy) A di Mauro (Italy) A Motti	6	6

Finals
3	(Croatia) N Mektić (Croatia) I Zovko	2	6	[3]
2	(Italy) A di Mauro (Italy) A Motti	6	3	[10]
