= 2011 Orbetello Challenger – Doubles =

Doubles
- 2011 Orbetello Challenger

Final
- Champions: (Austria) Julian Knowle (Slovakia) Igor Zelenay
- Runners-up: (France) Romain Jouan (France) Benoît Paire
- Score: 6–1, 7–6^{(7–2)}

Events
Singles	Doubles
← 2010 ·	Orbetello Challenger	· 2012 →

Alessio di Mauro and Alessandro Motti were the defending champions, but Matteo Baldi and Paolo Lorenzi defeated them in the quarterfinals.

Julian Knowle and Igor Zelenay won the title after defeating Romain Jouan and Benoît Paire in the final, 6–1, 7–6^{(7–2)}.

== Seeds ==
1. (Germany) Michael Kohlmann / (Netherlands) Rogier Wassen (first round)
2. (Austria) Julian Knowle / (Slovakia) Igor Zelenay (champions)
3. (United States) James Cerretani / (Croatia) Lovro Zovko (semifinals)
4. (Italy) Alessio di Mauro / (Italy) Alessandro Motti (quarterfinals)

=== Results ===
First round
1	Italy	6	6
Italy	3	4
Q	Belgium	3	4
Belgium	6	6
WC	Italy	4	6	7
WC	Italy	6	1	5
Argentina	6	6^{5}	1
7	France	2	7	6
4	Germany	6^{1}	1
Italy	7	6
France	2	2
France	6	6
Q	Spain	6	6
Q	Austria	4	3
Argentina	6	2	1
5	Italy	3	6	6

Second round
1	Italy	6	7
Belgium	3	5
WC	Italy	6^{1}	2
7	France	7	6
Italy	3	6	4
France	6	1	6
Q	Spain	6^{1}	5
5	Italy	7	7

Quarterfinals
1	Italy	6	6
7	France	4	4
France	6	6
5	Italy	1	4

Semifinals
1	Italy	6	6
France	1	4
Finals
Italy	6	2	6
6	France	3	6	2

== Draw ==
=== Key ===
- Q = Qualifier
- WC = Wild card
- LL = Lucky loser
- Alt = Alternate
- SE = Special exempt
- PR = Protected ranking
- ITF = ITF entry
- JE = Junior exempt
- w/o = Walkover
- r = Retired
- d = Defaulted
- SR = Special ranking

=== Draw ===
First round
1	(Germany) M Kohlmann (Netherlands) R Wassen	6	6^{5}	[7]
(France) R Jouan (France) B Paire	3	7^{7}	[10]
(Austria) M Raditschnigg (Argentina) Marco Trungelliti	4	3
WC	(Italy) M Jorquera (Italy) T Tenconi	6	6
3	(United States) J Cerretani (Croatia) L Zovko	6^{2}	6	[10]
(Spain) I Cervantes-Huegun (Sweden) C Lindell	7^{7}	3	[6]
(France) D Guez (Monaco) J-R Lisnard	1	6	[10]
WC	(Italy) Nicola Barraco (Italy) M Bortolotti	6	3	[6]
(France) J Eysseric (Belgium) D Goffin	1	6^{7}
WC	(Italy) Matteo Baldi (Italy) P Lorenzi	6	7^{9}
(Belgium) M Authom (Belgium) Julien Dubail	5	6	[9]
4	(Italy) A di Mauro (Italy) A Motti	7	2	[11]
(Spain) G Granollers (Spain) J Martí	7	6^{5}	[4]
(Italy) G Naso (Italy) M Viola	5	7^{7}	[10]
(Argentina) F Delbonis (Argentina) L Mayer	3	6^{2}
2	(Austria) J Knowle (Slovakia) I Zelenay	6	7^{7}

Quarterfinals
(France) R Jouan (France) B Paire	4	7^{7}	[10]
WC	(Italy) M Jorquera (Italy) T Tenconi	6	6^{4}	[5]
3	(United States) J Cerretani (Croatia) L Zovko	6	6
(France) D Guez (Monaco) J-R Lisnard	4	2
WC	(Italy) Matteo Baldi (Italy) P Lorenzi	6	4	[12]
4	(Italy) A di Mauro (Italy) A Motti	4	6	[10]
(Italy) G Naso (Italy) M Viola	2	2
2	(Austria) J Knowle (Slovakia) I Zelenay	6	6

Semifinals
(France) R Jouan (France) B Paire	3	6	[10]
3	(United States) J Cerretani (Croatia) L Zovko	6	4	[6]
WC	(Italy) Matteo Baldi (Italy) P Lorenzi	3	3
2	(Austria) J Knowle (Slovakia) I Zelenay	6	6

Final
(France) R Jouan (France) B Paire	1	6^{2}
2	(Austria) J Knowle (Slovakia) I Zelenay	6	7
