= 2012 Orbetello Challenger – Singles =

Singles
- 2012 Orbetello Challenger

Final
- Champion: (Spain) Roberto Bautista Agut
- Runner-up: (Serbia) Dušan Lajović
- Score: 6–3, 6–1

Events
Singles	Doubles
← 2011 ·	Orbetello Challenger	· 2013 →

Filippo Volandri was the defending champion but decided not to participate.
Roberto Bautista Agut won the title, defeating Dušan Lajović 6–3, 6–1 in the final.

== Seeds ==
1. (Spain) Roberto Bautista Agut (champion)
2. (Italy) Matteo Viola (semifinals)
3. (Canada) Peter Polansky (second round)
4. (Argentina) Facundo Bagnis (first round)
5. (Italy) Gianluca Naso (quarterfinals)
6. (Belgium) Yannick Mertens (first round)
7. (Italy) Simone Vagnozzi (second round)
8. (Portugal) Pedro Sousa (quarterfinals)

== Draw ==
=== Key ===
- Q = Qualifier
- WC = Wild card
- LL = Lucky loser
- Alt = Alternate
- SE = Special exempt
- PR = Protected ranking
- ITF = ITF entry
- JE = Junior exempt
- w/o = Walkover
- r = Retired
- d = Defaulted
- SR = Special ranking

=== Finals ===
Semifinals
1	(Spain) Roberto Bautista Agut	6	6
WC	(Italy) Alessio di Mauro	3	4
Q	(Serbia) Dušan Lajović	6	4	6
2	(Italy) Matteo Viola	3	6	3

Final
1	(Spain) Roberto Bautista Agut	6	6
Q	(Serbia) Dušan Lajović	3	1

=== Top half ===
First round
1	(Spain) R Bautista Agut	6	7^{7}
(Italy) S Galvani	1	6^{5}
(Netherlands) M Middelkoop	6	6
(Brazil) G Clezar	1	4
(Brazil) L Kirche	3	6	6
(Serbia) N Ćirić	6	3	2
(Italy) L Vanni	2	6	2
5	(Italy) G Naso	6	4	6
4	(Argentina) F Bagnis	0	5
WC	(Italy) A di Mauro	6	7
WC	(Italy) W Trusendi	6	6
Q	(Montenegro) G Tosic	4	1
(Italy) Andrea Arnaboldi	5	3
SE	(Kazakhstan) E Korolev	7	6
(France) D Guez	4	1
7	(Italy) S Vagnozzi	6	6

Second round
1	(Spain) R Bautista Agut	6	3	6
(Netherlands) M Middelkoop	3	6	2
(Brazil) L Kirche	2	3
5	(Italy) G Naso	6	6
WC	(Italy) A di Mauro	7^{7}	3	6
WC	(Italy) W Trusendi	6^{4}	6	2
SE	(Kazakhstan) E Korolev	6	6
7	(Italy) S Vagnozzi	3	2

Quarterfinals
1	(Spain) R Bautista Agut	6	6
5	(Italy) G Naso	1	3
WC	(Italy) A di Mauro	5
SE	(Kazakhstan) E Korolev	2^{r}

Semifinals
1	(Spain) R Bautista Agut	6	6
WC	(Italy) A di Mauro	3	4

=== Bottom half ===
First round
6	(Belgium) Y Mertens	4	1
WC	(Italy) Marco Cecchinato	6	6
Q	(Serbia) D Lajović	6	6
(France) Julien Obry	1	3
(Spain) S Gutiérrez Ferrol	6	6
(Colombia) A González	2	4
WC	(Italy) M Marrai	0	0
3	(Canada) P Polansky	6	6
8	(Portugal) P Sousa	6	2	7^{7}
Q	(France) J Inzerillo	0	6	6^{2}
(France) R Jouan	6	7^{7}
(Czech Republic) Marek Michalička	2	6^{4}
Q	(Greece) Theodoros Angelinos	2	6	6
(Italy) Enrico Burzi	6	1	2
(Serbia) B Pašanski	6^{6}	4
2	(Italy) M Viola	7^{8}	6

Second round
WC	(Italy) Marco Cecchinato	5	1
Q	(Serbia) D Lajović	7	6
(Spain) S Gutiérrez Ferrol	7	7
3	(Canada) P Polansky	5	5
8	(Portugal) P Sousa	6
(France) R Jouan	4	r
Q	(Greece) Theodoros Angelinos	6	4	1
2	(Italy) M Viola	2	6	6

Quarterfinals
Q	(Serbia) D Lajović	6	6
(Spain) S Gutiérrez Ferrol	4	2
8	(Portugal) P Sousa	3	1
2	(Italy) M Viola	6	6

Semifinals
Q	(Serbia) D Lajović	6	4	6
2	(Italy) M Viola	3	6	3
