= 2009 Trofeo Bellaveglia – Singles =

Singles
- 2009 Trofeo Bellaveglia

Final
- Champion: (Ukraine) Oleksandr Dolgopolov Jr.
- Runner-up: (Spain) Pablo Andújar
- Score: 6–4, 6–2

Events
Singles	Doubles
- Trofeo Bellaveglia

Oleksandr Dolgopolov Jr., who received a special exempt into the main draw, became the first champion of this tournament. He defeated 3rd-seeded Pablo Andújar 6–4, 6–2 in the final.

== Seeds ==
1. (Belgium) Olivier Rochus (second round)
2. (Portugal) Rui Machado (quarterfinals)
3. (Spain) Pablo Andújar (final)
4. (Algeria) Lamine Ouahab (semifinals, retired)
5. (Argentina) Sebastián Decoud (first round)
6. (Spain) Pere Riba (second round)
7. (Italy) Paolo Lorenzi (quarterfinals)
8. (Slovakia) Dominik Hrbatý (first round)

== Draw ==
Key

- Q = Qualifier
- WC = Wild card
- LL = Lucky loser
- Alt = Alternate
- ITF = ITF entry
- PR = Protected ranking
- SR = Special ranking
- SE = Special exempt
- JE = Junior exempt
- JR = Junior Accelerator Programme entrant
- CO = College Accelerator Programme entrant
- NG = Next Gen Accelerator Program entrant
- w/o = Walkover
- r = Retired
- d = Defaulted

=== Final four ===
Semifinals
Q	(Republic of Ireland) Louk Sorensen	4	2
3	(Spain) Pablo Andújar	6	6
4	(Algeria) Lamine Ouahab	3	0^{r}
SE	(Ukraine) Oleksandr Dolgopolov Jr.	6	3

Final
3	(Spain) Pablo Andújar	4	2
SE	(Ukraine) Oleksandr Dolgopolov Jr.	6	6

=== Top half ===
First round
1	(Belgium) O Rochus	6	6
(Italy) A di Mauro	2	4
Q	(Portugal) J Sousa	6	1	4
(Serbia) B Pašanski	1	6	6
Q	(Romania) A Ungur	4	1
(Brazil) F Ferreiro	6	6
Q	(Republic of Ireland) L Sorensen	6	3	6
8	(Slovakia) D Hrbatý	4	6	2
3	(Spain) P Andújar	7	6
(Spain) D Marrero	6^{3}	2
WC	(Italy) G Naso	6	6
WC	(Italy) F Gaio	3	4
WC	(Italy) T Fabbiano	6	4	1
(Spain) P Santos	3	6	6
(Czech Republic) L Rosol	5	3
7	(Italy) P Lorenzi	7	6

Second round
1	(Belgium) O Rochus	4	6	2
(Serbia) B Pašanski	6	2	6
(Brazil) F Ferreiro	6^{10}	1
Q	(Republic of Ireland) L Sorensen	7	6
3	(Spain) P Andújar	5	6	7
WC	(Italy) G Naso	7	1	5
(Spain) P Santos	2	1
7	(Italy) P Lorenzi	6	6

Quarterfinals
(Serbia) B Pašanski	3	7	1
Q	(Republic of Ireland) L Sorensen	6	6^{5}	6
3	(Spain) P Andújar	6	6
7	(Italy) P Lorenzi	2	1

Semifinals
Q	(Republic of Ireland) L Sorensen	4	2
3	(Spain) P Andújar	6	6

=== Bottom half ===
First round
5	(Argentina) S Decoud	3	3
(Argentina) JP Brzezicki	6	6
(France) O Patience	7	7
(Italy) T Tenconi	5	6^{4}
(Netherlands) J Huta Galung	6^{5}	0
Q	(Italy) M Jorquera	7	6
(Czech Republic) P Šnobel	4	1
4	(Algeria) L Ouahab	6	6
6	(Spain) P Riba	3	6	0
(Spain) D Muñoz-De La Nava	6	4	0^{r}
SE	(Ukraine) O Dolgopolov Jr.	4	6	6
WC	(Russia) A Kuznetsov	6	3	4
(France) A Sidorenko	7	2	0
SE	(Italy) D Bracciali	5	6	6
(Czech Republic) J Vaněk	0	1
2	(Portugal) R Machado	6	6

Second round
(Argentina) JP Brzezicki	6	6
(France) O Patience	4	1
Q	(Italy) M Jorquera	3	4
4	(Algeria) L Ouahab	6	6
6	(Spain) P Riba	2	2
SE	(Ukraine) O Dolgopolov Jr.	6	6
SE	(Italy) D Bracciali	4	3
2	(Portugal) R Machado	6	6

Quarterfinals
(Argentina) JP Brzezicki	4	3
4	(Algeria) L Ouahab	6	6
SE	(Ukraine) O Dolgopolov Jr.	7	6
2	(Portugal) R Machado	5	3

Semifinals
4	(Algeria) L Ouahab	3	0^{r}
SE	(Ukraine) O Dolgopolov Jr.	6	3
