= 2012 Orbetello Challenger =

- Date: 23 – 29 July
- Edition: 4th
- Surface: Clay
- Location: Orbetello, Italy

Champions

Singles
- (Spain) Roberto Bautista Agut

Doubles
- (Italy) Stefano Ianni / (Australia) Dane Propoggia
- Orbetello Challenger

The 2012 Orbetello Challenger was a professional tennis tournament played on clay courts. It was the fourth edition of the tournament which was part of the 2012 ATP Challenger Tour. It took place in Orbetello, Italy between 23 and 29 July 2012.

== Singles main draw entrants ==
=== Seeds ===
Country	Player	Rank^{1}	Seed
ESP	Roberto Bautista Agut	118	1
ITA	Matteo Viola	155	2
CAN	Peter Polansky	156	3
ARG	Facundo Bagnis	163	4
ITA	Gianluca Naso	175	5
BEL	Yannick Mertens	217	6
ITA	Simone Vagnozzi	223	7
POR	Pedro Sousa	232	8

- ^{1} Rankings are as of July 16, 2012.

=== Other entrants ===
The following players received wildcards into the singles main draw:

- (Italy) Marco Cecchinato
- (Italy) Alessio di Mauro
- (Italy) Matteo Marrai
- (Italy) Walter Trusendi

The following players received entry as a special exempt into the singles main draw:

- (Kazakhstan) Evgeny Korolev

The following players received entry from the qualifying draw:

- (Greece) Theodoros Angelinos
- (France) Jérôme Inzerillo
- (Serbia) Dušan Lajović
- (Montenegro) Goran Tošić

== Champions ==
=== Singles ===
- (Spain) Roberto Bautista Agut def. (Serbia) Dušan Lajović, 6–3, 6–1

=== Doubles ===
- (Italy) Stefano Ianni / (Australia) Dane Propoggia def. (Italy) Alessio di Mauro / (Italy) Simone Vagnozzi, 6–3, 6–2
