= 2012 Orbetello Challenger – Doubles =

Doubles
- 2012 Orbetello Challenger

Final
- Champions: (Italy) Stefano Ianni (Australia) Dane Propoggia
- Runners-up: (Italy) Alessio di Mauro (Italy) Simone Vagnozzi
- Score: 6–3, 6–2

Events
Singles	Doubles
← 2011 ·	Orbetello Challenger	· 2013 →

Julian Knowle and Igor Zelenay were the defending champions but decided not to participate.
Stefano Ianni and Dane Propoggia won the title, defeating Alessio di Mauro and Simone Vagnozzi 6–3, 6–2 in the final.

== Seeds ==
1. (Italy) Alessio di Mauro / (Italy) Simone Vagnozzi (final)
2. (Italy) Stefano Ianni / (Australia) Dane Propoggia (champions)
3. (France) Romain Jouan / (Italy) Alessandro Motti (first round)
4. (Italy) Walter Trusendi / (Italy) Matteo Viola (quarterfinals)

== Draw ==
=== Key ===
- Q = Qualifier
- WC = Wild card
- LL = Lucky loser
- Alt = Alternate
- SE = Special exempt
- PR = Protected ranking
- ITF = ITF entry
- JE = Junior exempt
- w/o = Walkover
- r = Retired
- d = Defaulted
- SR = Special ranking

=== Draw ===
First round
1	(Italy) A di Mauro (Italy) S Vagnozzi	1	7^{10}	[10]
(Czech Republic) Marek Michalička (Serbia) B Pašanski	6	6^{8}	[4]
WC	(Italy) Francesco Borgo (Italy) M Bortolotti	3	5
(Netherlands) M Middelkoop (Netherlands) Miliaan Niesten	6	7
4	(Italy) W Trusendi (Italy) M Viola	6	6
(Serbia) N Ćirić (Montenegro) G Tošić	0	3
(Italy) Andrea Arnaboldi (Spain) S Gutiérrez Ferrol	6	6
(Brazil) G Clezar (Brazil) L Kirche	4	4
(France) J Inzerillo (France) Julien Obry	4	2
(Uruguay) A Behar (Australia) Chris Letcher	6	6
WC	(Italy) Nicola Barraco (Italy) G Naso	6	6
3	(France) R Jouan (Italy) A Motti	3	4
(Colombia) A González (Canada) P Polansky	6	6
(Italy) Marco Cecchinato (Italy) S Galvani	3	4
WC	(Italy) M Marrai (Italy) Marco Stancati	6	1	[4]
2	(Italy) S Ianni (Australia) D Propoggia	4	6	[10]

Quarterfinals
1	(Italy) A di Mauro (Italy) S Vagnozzi	7^{7}	6
(Netherlands) M Middelkoop (Netherlands) Miliaan Niesten	6^{4}	3
4	(Italy) W Trusendi (Italy) M Viola	6	3	[9]
(Italy) Andrea Arnaboldi (Spain) S Gutiérrez Ferrol	4	6	[11]
(Uruguay) A Behar (Australia) Chris Letcher	6	6^{5}	[10]
WC	(Italy) Nicola Barraco (Italy) G Naso	2	7^{7}	[3]
(Colombia) A González (Canada) P Polansky	6	5	[4]
2	(Italy) S Ianni (Australia) D Propoggia	2	7	[10]

Semifinals
1	(Italy) A di Mauro (Italy) S Vagnozzi	3	6	[10]
(Italy) Andrea Arnaboldi (Spain) S Gutiérrez Ferrol	6	4	[5]
(Uruguay) A Behar (Australia) Chris Letcher	6	6^{1}	[8]
2	(Italy) S Ianni (Australia) D Propoggia	4	7^{7}	[10]

Final
1	(Italy) A di Mauro (Italy) S Vagnozzi	3	2
2	(Italy) S Ianni (Australia) D Propoggia	6	6
