= 2010 Trofeo Bellaveglia =

- Date: July 19 – July 25
- Edition: 2nd
- Location: Orbetello, Italy

Champions

Singles
- (Spain) Pablo Andújar

Doubles
- (Italy) Alessio di Mauro / (Italy) Alessandro Motti
← 2009 ·	Trofeo Bellaveglia	· 2011 →

The 2010 Trofeo Bellaveglia was a professional tennis tournament played on outdoor red clay courts. This was the second edition of the tournament which is part of the 2010 ATP Challenger Tour. It took place in Orbetello, Italy between 19 July and 25 July 2010.

== ATP entrants ==
=== Seeds ===
Nationality	Player	Ranking*	Seeding
ARG	Carlos Berlocq	101	1
ITA	~~Filippo Volandri~~	108	2
ITA	Paolo Lorenzi	121	3
AUT	Martin Fischer	122	4
ESP	Pablo Andújar	125	5
FRA	Édouard Roger-Vasselin	127	6
ROU	Adrian Ungur	131	7
ARG	Federico del Bonis	134	8

- Rankings are as of July 12, 2010.

=== Other entrants ===
The following players received wildcards into the singles main draw:

- (Italy) Giulio Di Meo
- (Italy) Thomas Fabbiano
- (Italy) Frederico Gaio
- (Italy) Gianluca Naso

The following players received entry from the qualifying draw:

- (France) Thomas Cazes-Carrère
- (Belgium) Julien Dubail
- (Sweden) Ervin Eleskovic
- (France) Clément Reix

== Champions ==
=== Singles ===
(Spain) Pablo Andújar def. (France) Édouard Roger-Vasselin, 6–4, 6–3.

=== Doubles ===
(Italy) Alessio di Mauro / (Italy) Alessandro Motti def. (Croatia) Nikola Mektić / (Croatia) Ivan Zovko, 6–2, 3–6, [10–3].
