= 2011 Orbetello Challenger =

- Date: 18–24 July
- Edition: 3rd
- Location: Orbetello, Italy

Champions

Singles
- (Italy) Filippo Volandri

Doubles
- (Austria) Julian Knowle / (Slovakia) Igor Zelenay
- Orbetello Challenger

The 2011 Orbetello Challenger was a professional tennis tournament played on clay courts. It was the third edition of the tournament which was part of the 2011 ATP Challenger Tour. It took place in Orbetello, Italy between 18 and 24 July 2011.

== ATP entrants ==
=== Seeds ===
| Country | Player | Rank^{1} | Seed |
|---|---|---|---|
| ITA | Filippo Volandri | 87 | 1 |
| NED | Thiemo de Bakker | 99 | 2 |
| ARG | Diego Junqueira | 101 | 3 |
| GER | Mischa Zverev | 104 | 4 |
| ITA | Paolo Lorenzi | 119 | 5 |
| FRA | Édouard Roger-Vasselin | 122 | 6 |
| FRA | Benoît Paire | 126 | 7 |
| FRA | Florent Serra | 136 | 8 |

- ^{1} Rankings are as of July 11, 2011.

=== Other entrants ===
The following players received wildcards into the singles main draw:

- (Italy) Marco Cecchinato
- (Netherlands) Thiemo de Bakker
- (Italy) Matteo Trevisan
- (Italy) Filippo Volandri

The following players received entry from the qualifying draw:

- (Belgium) Maxime Authom
- (Monaco) Benjamin Balleret
- (Spain) Iñigo Cervantes-Huegun
- (Austria) Max Raditschnigg

The following players received entry as a lucky loser:

- (Spain) Gerard Granollers

== Champions ==
=== Singles ===
(Italy) Filippo Volandri def. (Italy) Matteo Viola, 4–6, 6–3, 6–2

=== Doubles ===
(Austria) Julian Knowle / (Slovakia) Igor Zelenay def. (France) Benoît Paire / (France) Romain Jouan, 6–1, 7–6^{(7–2)}
