= Dušan Lajović =

Serbian tennis player (born 1990)

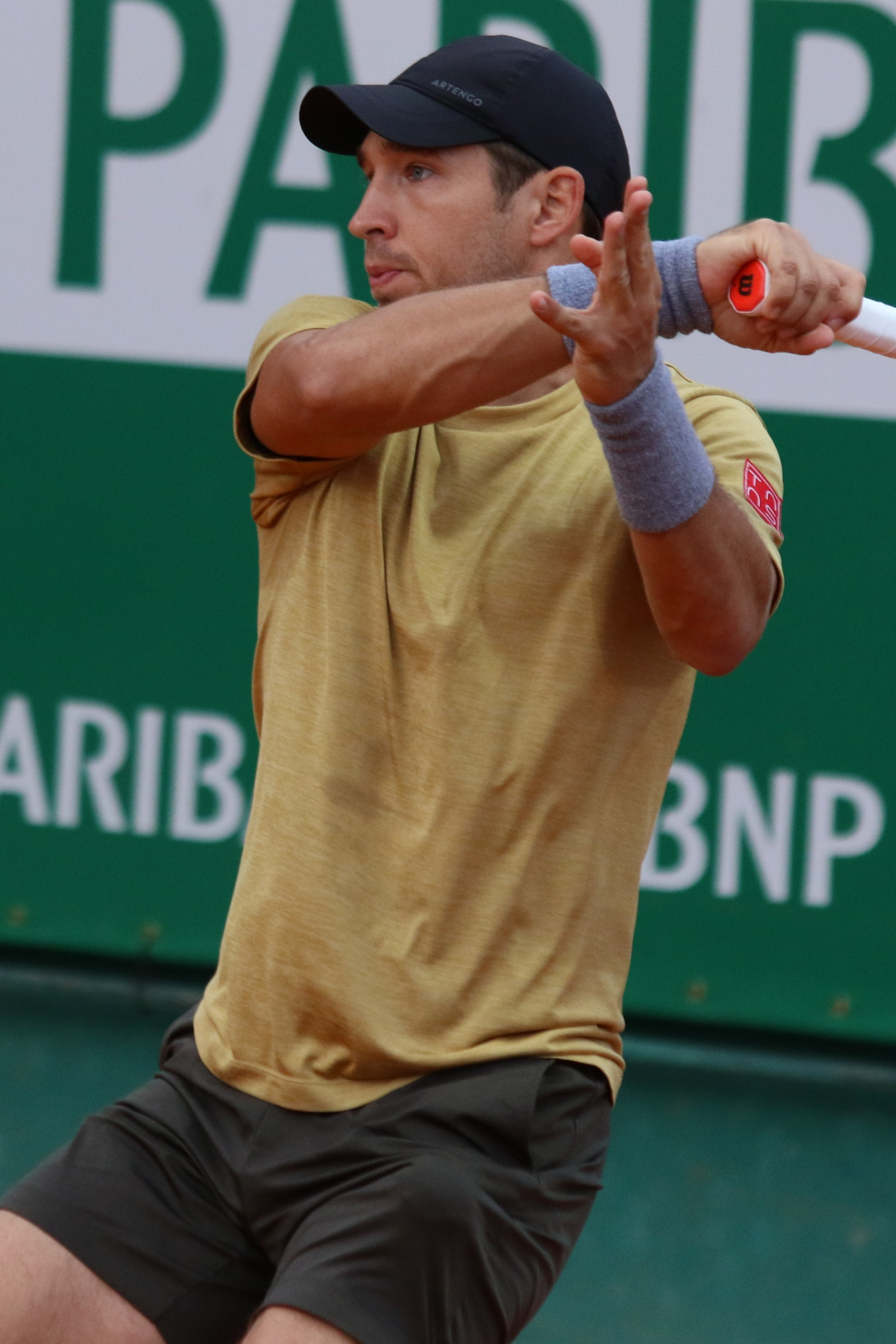
- Lajovic at the 2022 Monte-Carlo Masters
- Country (sports): Serbia
- Residence: Stara Pazova, Serbia
- Born: 30 June 1990 (age 36) Belgrade, SR Serbia, SFR Yugoslavia
- Height: 1.83 m (6 ft 0 in)
- Turned pro: June 2007
- Plays: Right-handed (one-handed backhand)
- Coach: José Perlas (2016–25), Ilija Bozoljac
- Prize money: US $10,758,689

Singles
- Career record: 210–279
- Career titles: 2
- Highest ranking: No. 23 (29 April 2019)
- Current ranking: No. 158 (9 November 2026)

Grand Slam singles results
- Australian Open: 4R (2021)
- French Open: 4R (2014)
- Wimbledon: 2R (2014, 2017, 2021, 2022)
- US Open: 3R (2018)

Other tournaments
- Olympic Games: 1R (2024)

Doubles
- Career record: 46–89
- Career titles: 2
- Highest ranking: No. 82 (21 September 2020)

Grand Slam doubles results
- Australian Open: 2R (2017)
- French Open: QF (2019)
- Wimbledon: 2R (2018)
- US Open: 2R (2014, 2018)

Team competitions
- Davis Cup: F (2013)
- Last updated on: 10 November 2026.

Dušan Lajović (Serbian Cyrillic: Душан Лајовић; born 30 June 1990) is a Serbian professional tennis player. On 29 April 2019, he reached his career-high singles ranking of world No. 23. On 21 September 2020, he peaked at No. 82 in the doubles rankings. Lajović has won two singles and two doubles titles on the ATP Tour.

He won his first singles tournament at the 2019 Croatia Open and reached his first Masters 1000 final at the 2019 Monte-Carlo Masters. He is best known for his clay court game, kick serve and strong flowing groundstrokes, especially his one-handed backhand. Lajović regularly represents Serbia in team competitions, after playing in the now defunct World Team Cup in 2010 and 2011. He is a member of the Serbian Davis Cup team since 2012 and contributed greatly to Serbia winning the inaugural ATP Cup in 2020, as he won four of his six matches. He also qualified for the 2024 Paris Olympics.

== Career ==
=== 2007–2011: ATP debut ===
For a long time, Lajović primarily played on the Futures circuit and the Challenger circuit.

In 2011 he qualified for the Kremlin Cup, and lost in the first round of the main draw. In the 2011 St. Petersburg Open, he reached the quarterfinals for the first time in his career.

=== 2012: Davis Cup debut ===
In 2012, he began working with a new coach, Boris Bošnjaković, played in the Davis Cup for the first time, reached the finals of 2012 Orbetello Challenger and won the 2012 Samarkand Challenger.

=== 2013: Davis Cup finalist ===
Replacing an injured Janko Tipsarević, he played two live rubbers in the 2013 Davis Cup final, including the deciding rubber against Radek Štěpánek of the Czech Republic. He was defeated comfortably in both but was praised by teammate Novak Djokovic for how he coped with the big occasion.

=== 2014: Major debut at Australian Open, French Open fourth round ===
His first appearance in the main draw of a grand slam was at Australian Open and he reached second round where he lost to Kei Nishikori. He bettered this at the French Open by reaching the fourth round where he was beaten in straight sets by then-world number one and eventual champion Rafael Nadal.

=== 2015: First ATP doubles title & second Davis Cup quarterfinal ===
Partnered with Radu Albot, they won the Istanbul doubles title, marking the first ATP doubles title for the Serb. At the French Open he lost to eventual champion Stan Wawrinka in the second round in four sets.

=== 2016: Third Davis Cup quarterfinal ===
At the Argentina Open, Lajović reached quarterfinals defeating world No. 12 John Isner en route. He reached the semifinals of the Brasil Open after beating top seed and world No. 20 Benoît Paire in the second round, that was his first tour-level semifinal appearance after losing all eight prior quarterfinals matches before in his career. This was followed by semifinal appearances at the 2016 Generali Open in Kitzbühel and the 2016 Los Cabos Open.

=== 2017: Masters fourth round & Davis Cup semifinal ===
In Indian Wells, the Serbian defeated five opponents to reach the fourth round eventually losing to Pablo Carreño Busta.

His contributions in successful Davis Cup ties against Russia & Spain, resulted in Serbia making the semifinal where he defeated Lucas Pouille but lost to Jo-Wilfried Tsonga.

=== 2018: Masters quarterfinal ===
At the Australian Open Lajović lost in five sets to US Open quarterfinalist Diego Schwartzman in his opening match. His next match was a five set loss to Miami Masters champion John Isner in a Davis Cup tie. A temporary return to the Challenger Tour resulted in winning the Open Region Guadeloupe.

After qualifying for the Monte-Carlo Masters, he faced 12 time Grand Slam champion Novak Djokovic, losing in straight sets. At the Madrid Masters, he defeated former top ten player Richard Gasquet in the second round, followed by a victory over world No. 6 Juan Martín del Potro, before falling to world No. 8 Kevin Anderson in the quarterfinals. This clay-court season was topped off with a semifinal appearance at the Lyon Open and a five-set loss at the French Open to world No. 3 Alexander Zverev.

Lajović's first-round match at Wimbledon was against defending champion & world No. 2 Roger Federer, he would lose in three quick sets. At the China Open he was able to secure his second victory over a top 10 player, defeating world No. 7 Grigor Dimitrov. On 15 October, Lajović reached the top 50 ranking for the first time in his career.

=== 2019: Top 25 debut, Masters final, Maiden title ===
In January 2019, Lajović scored his 100th career victory and reached a new career-high ranking of world No. 45. Lajović secured his third top-ten victory in Miami defeating world No. 6 Kei Nishikori. At the Monte-Carlo Masters, he reached his maiden ATP Tour final without dropping a set. En route to the final, Lajović defeated former top 10 player David Goffin, reigning French Open finalist, world No. 5 Dominic Thiem, and world No. 14 Daniil Medvedev. His run ended in the final against Fabio Fognini in straight sets. Lajović climbed to a new career-high ranking of No. 24 at the conclusion of the tournament. Lajović won his first ATP Tour singles title at the Croatian Open in Umag, defeating Hungarian Attila Balázs in straight sets in the final.

=== 2020: ATP Cup champion ===
At the inaugural ATP Cup, Lajović assisted Serbia in making history as the first nation to win Davis, World Team and ATP Cups, winning four of six matches. At the Australian Open he defeated 2018 semifinalist Kyle Edmund in straight sets before losing to world no. 14 Diego Schwartzman in the third round.

=== 2021: Australian Open fourth round ===
Lajović started his 2021 season representing Serbia at the ATP Cup. He lost to Milos Raonic of Canada and Jan-Lennard Struff of Germany. Despite winning last year, Serbia failed to defend the title. Seeded 23rd at the Australian Open, he reached the fourth round of a Grand Slam for a second time in his career. He ended up getting defeated by 6th seed Alexander Zverev.

Seeded third at the Open Sud de France in Montpellier, Lajović was eliminated in the second round by Dennis Novak. At the Rotterdam Open, he stunned World No. 3 and top seed, Daniil Medvedev, in the first round. With this win, Lajović was able to stop Medvedev from reaching number two in the ATP rankings. He was beaten in the second round by Borna Ćorić.

=== 2022: Third consecutive ATP Cup, Out of top 100 ===
Lajović started his 2022 season by representing Serbia at the ATP Cup as the No. 1 player after the withdrawal of Novak Djokovic. Serbia was in Group A alongside Norway, Chile, and Spain. He ended up losing to Casper Ruud, Cristian Garín via retirement, and Roberto Bautista Agut. Serbia ended up third in Group A. Seeded sixth at the Sydney Classic, he was defeated in the second round by American Maxime Cressy. At the Australian Open, he was eliminated in the second round by world No. 31 Carlos Alcaraz.

Seeded fifth at the Argentina Open, Lajović was beaten in the second round by Argentinian Federico Coria. In Rio, he lost in the first round to Fernando Verdasco. At the Mexican Open, he was defeated in the second round by Tommy Paul. Playing at the Indian Wells Masters, he lost in the first round to Filip Krajinović. In Miami, he lost in the first round to Juan Manuel Cerúndolo.

Lajović kicked off his clay-court season at the Monte-Carlo Masters. He lost his second-round match to Grigor Dimitrov. Competing at the Serbia Open in his country, he was defeated in the first round by qualifier Taro Daniel. At the Estoril Open, he lost in the first round to fifth seed and eventual finalist, Frances Tiafoe. In May, Lajović played at the Madrid Open. He stunned World No. 7 and fifth seed, Casper Ruud, in the second round. He fell in the third round to World No. 14 and twelfth seed, Hubert Hurkacz. Getting past qualifying at the Italian Open, he lost in the first round to Alex de Minaur. Ranked No. 64 at the French Open, he was defeated in the first round by Sebastián Báez.

Seeded second at the Emilia-Romagna Open, an ATP Challenger event in Italy, Lajović reached the semifinals where he lost to Borna Ćorić.

Lajović played only one tournament to prepare for Wimbledon. At the Mallorca Championships, he was ousted from the tournament in the first round by Daniel Altmaier. Ranked also No. 64 at Wimbledon, he lost in the second round to Alexander Bublik.

Seeded second at the Salzburg Open, an ATP Challenger event in Austria, Lajović made it to the quarterfinals where he lost to sixth seed and eventual champion, Thiago Monteiro.

He left the top 100 at No. 102 on 21 November 2022, his lowest year-end ranking in 10 years.

In December he won the 2022 Maia Challenger, his seventh at this level.

He finished the year ranked No. 80 on 5 December 2023.

=== 2023: Win over world No. 1 and second title, back to top 50, 100th clay win ===
In January, Lajovic lost in three tight sets in the qualifying of ASB Classic to Christopher Eubanks. At the Australian Open, he lost in the first round in four sets against 20th seed Denis Shapovalov.

In February, during the Golden Swing in South America, he reached as a qualifier the quarterfinals of the Argentina Open after defeating reigning Córdoba Open champion Sebastián Báez in the first round. In the second round, he defeated Camilo Ugo Carabelli in straight sets to reach his first quarterfinal of the season. In the quarterfinals, he was defeated by the top seed, Carlos Alcaraz.

At the Rio Open, Lajovic reached his second quarterfinal after defeating fifth seed Diego Schwartzman in the first round and compatriot Laslo Djere in the second, both in straight sets. In the quarterfinals, he was defeated again by the top seed Carlos Alcaraz. For the second time, he reached back-to-back quarterfinals at the Chile Open by defeating again Camilo Ugo Carabelli in the first round and Juan Manuel Cerúndolo in the round of 16. In the quarterfinals, he lost to Tomás Martín Etcheverry.

At the 2023 Miami Open he won his first hard court match of the season against Andy Murray. Next he defeated 30th seed Maxime Cressy to reach the third round, where he lost to Carlos Alcaraz in straight sets.

In April, he won his second career ATP title in Banja Luka. In the first round he defeated compatriot Filip Krajinović in three tight sets and in the second, eight seed Grégoire Barrère in straight sets. In the quarterfinals, he defeated top seed and world No. 1 Novak Djokovic in straight sets for the biggest win of his career. In the semifinals, he won over fourth seed and compatriot Miomir Kecmanović in three sets, after three hours of play. In the final, he defeated defending champion and second seed Andrey Rublev and returned to the top-40 in rankings.

At the 2023 Mutua Madrid Open he recorded his 100th clay match win defeating Jason Kubler in the first round becoming only the second Serbian in the Open Era after Djokovic to reach this milestone. In the second round Lajović scored his third Top 10 win in the space of nine days by taking out seventh seed Félix Auger-Aliassime.

In September, during the Davis Cup Finals in Valencia, Lajovic, playing singles, won in straight sets against Hong Seong-chan from South Korea and gave the all-important first point to his Serbian Davis Cup team.

In October, Lajovic advanced to the third round of the Shanghai Masters, after beating Stan Wawrinka in the first round and Tallon Griekspoor in the second, both matches winning in straight sets. In the third round, he lost to Hungarian Fábián Marozsán. in the same month, he also made the second round at the next Masters in Paris as a lucky loser, defeating wildcard Benjamin Bonzi.

=== 2024–2026: Two Golden swing quarterfinals, Olympics, out of top 100 ===
At the 2024 Argentina Open he reached back-to-back quarterfinals at this tournament defeating eight seed Arthur Fils and Alejandro Tabilo before losing to eventual champion, wildcard Facundo Díaz Acosta. At the 2024 Rio Open he reached back-to-back quarterfinals in two consecutive weeks.

He reached his second career semifinal above the ATP 250 level, at the ATP 500 the 2024 Barcelona Open Banc Sabadell, with wins over qualifier Diego Schwartzman, sixth seed Ugo Humbert, 11th seed Alejandro Davidovich Fokina and 16th seed Arthur Fils.

He qualified for the 2024 Paris Olympics making his debut.

Dušan Lajović serves during his Men’s Qualifying Singles Round 3 match against C. Wong.

During the 2026 US Open Men’s Qualifying Singles – Round 3: C. Wong defeated D. Lajović 6–4, 6–3. The match was delayed due to rain before Wong completed a hard fought victory.

Dušan Lajović hits a forehand during his Men’s Qualifying Singles Round 3 match on Court 7 at the USTA Billie Jean King National Tennis Center.

== Playing style ==
Lajović plays his best games on clay courts, with a strong baseline game capable of creating decent pace on both wings. He can create heavy kick on his serve, especially effective on clay.

== Personal life ==
Lajović was born 30 June 1990 in Belgrade, Serbia to parents Marina and Dragiša Lajović. He started playing tennis when he was seven years old in T.K. Stara Pazova and later continued in T.K. Partizan Belgrade. He is in a long-term relationship with Serbian medical doctor Lidija Mikic. He lives in Stara Pazova, Serbia where he used to own a coffee shop.

== Performance timelines ==
Key
W	F	SF	QF	#R	RR	Q#	P#	DNQ	A	Z#	PO	G	S	B	NMS	NTI	P	NH

(W) winner; (F) finalist; (SF) semifinalist; (QF) quarterfinalist; (#R) rounds 4, 3, 2, 1; (RR) round-robin stage; (Q#) qualification round; (P#) preliminary round; (DNQ) did not qualify; (A) absent; (Z#) Davis/Fed Cup Zonal Group (with number indication) or (PO) play-off; (G) gold, (S) silver or (B) bronze Olympic/Paralympic medal; (NMS) not a Masters tournament; (NTI) not a Tier I tournament; (P) postponed; (NH) not held; (SR) strike rate (events won / competed); (W–L) win–loss record.
To avoid confusion and double counting, these charts are updated at the conclusion of a tournament or when the player's participation has ended.

=== Singles ===
Current through the 2026 Madrid Open.

Tournament	2010	2011	2012	2013	2014	2015	2016	2017	2018	2019	2020	2021	2022	2023	2024	2025	2026	SR	W–L	Win%
Grand Slam tournaments
Australian Open	A	A	Q1	Q2	2R	1R	2R	2R	1R	1R	3R	4R	2R	1R	1R	1R	Q3	0 / 12	9–12	43%
French Open	A	A	Q1	Q3	4R	2R	2R	1R	2R	3R	2R	1R	1R	1R	2R	1R	Q1	0 / 12	10–12	45%
Wimbledon	A	A	Q1	Q1	2R	1R	1R	2R	1R	1R	NH	2R	2R	1R	1R	1R	1R	0 / 12	4–11	27%
US Open	A	A	A	Q1	1R	Q1	1R	1R	3R	2R	1R	2R	1R	1R	1R	Q1		0 / 10	4–10	29%
Win–loss	0–0	0–0	0–0	0–0	5–4	1–3	2–4	2–4	3–4	3–4	3–3	5–4	2–4	0–4	1–4	0–3	0–0	0 / 46	27–45	38%
National representation
Davis Cup	A	A	QF	F	1R	QF	QF	SF	1R	QF	SF		GS	SF	WG1	A		0 / 11	13–12	52%
World Team Cup	RR	RR	A	Not Held														0 / 2	1–1	50%
ATP Cup	Not Held										W	RR	RR	Not Held				1 / 3	4–7	36%
Summer Olympics	Not Held		A	Not Held			A	Not Held				A	Not Held		1R	Not Held		0 / 1	0–1	0%
Win–loss	0–1	1–0	1–0	0–2	2–2	1–0	1–1	3–1	1–1	1–1	4–2	1–3	1–3	1–1	0–3	0–0	0–0	1 / 17	18–21	46%
ATP Tour Masters 1000
Indian Wells Masters	A	A	A	A	1R	1R	1R	4R	2R	2R	NH	2R	1R	Q1	2R	2R	A	0 / 10	7–10	41%
Miami Open	A	A	A	A	3R	1R	2R	1R	2R	3R	NH	3R	1R	3R	1R	Q1	A	0 / 10	8–10	44%
Monte-Carlo Masters	A	A	A	A	Q1	A	A	Q1	1R	F	NH	1R	2R	1R	Q1	1R	A	0 / 6	6–6	50%
Madrid Open	A	A	A	A	A	A	Q2	A	QF	1R	NH	1R	3R	3R	1R	1R	2R	0 / 8	8–8	50%
Italian Open	A	A	A	A	Q2	1R	Q1	A	Q2	Q2	3R	1R	1R	1R	2R	2R	Q1	0 / 7	4–7	36%
Canadian Open	A	A	A	A	A	A	A	A	A	1R	NH	3R	A	A	A	A		0 / 2	2–2	50%
Cincinnati Open	A	A	A	A	A	A	A	Q1	1R	1R	1R	1R	Q2	3R	Q1	A		0 / 5	2–5	29%
Shanghai Masters	A	A	A	A	A	A	Q2	1R	Q1	1R	Not Held			3R	A	A		0 / 3	2–3	40%
Paris Masters	A	A	A	A	Q1	2R	1R	Q1	Q1	1R	1R	2R	A	2R	Q1	A		0 / 6	3–6	33%
Win–loss	0–0	0–0	0–0	0–0	1–2	1–4	1–3	3–3	5–5	8–8	2–3	4–8	3–5	9–7	2–4	2–4	1–1	0 / 57	42–57	42%
Career statistics
	2010	2011	2012	2013	2014	2015	2016	2017	2018	2019	2020	2021	2022	2023	2024	2025	2026	Career		
Tournaments	1	5	1	4	17	21	22	21	23	27	14	25	20	23	17	13	4	Career total: 258		
Titles	0	0	0	0	0	0	0	0	0	1	0	0	0	1	0	0	0	Career total: 2		
Finals	0	0	0	0	0	0	0	0	0	2	0	0	0	1	0	0	0	Career total: 3		
Hard win–loss	0–0	2–3	1–0	0–2	6–10	3–8	8–12	10–11	8–9	9–16	7–9	12–17	4–11	8–11	4–8	2–3	0–0	0 / 114	85–129	40%
Clay win–loss	0–2	1–2	1–1	0–4	9–6	14–12	11–9	6–9	15–13	12–9	7–7	5–9	6–10	15–12	13–10	2–9	2–5	2 / 125	119–129	48%
Grass win–loss	0–0	0–0	0–0	0–0	1–3	0–1	0–2	2–2	1–2	0–2	0–0	1–2	1–2	0–1	0–1	0–1	0–0	0 / 19	6–19	24%
Overall win–loss	0–2	3–5	2–1	0–6	16–19	17–21	19–23	18–22	24–24	21–27	14–16	18–28	11–23	24–23	17–19	4–13	2–5	2 / 258	210–277	43%
Win (%)	0%	38%	67%	0%	46%	45%	45%	45%	50%	44%	47%	40%	32%	51%	47%	24%	29%	43%		
Year-end ranking (Note: 2007: ATP ranking–1479) (Note: 2008: ATP ranking–1080) (Note: 2009: ATP ranking–568)	434	190	163	116	69	76	93	75	48	34	26	33	80	52	81	121		$10,567,457		

=== Doubles ===
Tournament	2014	2015	2016	2017	2018	2019	2020	2021	2022	2023	2024	2025	2026	SR	W–L	Win%
Australian Open	A	1R	1R	2R	1R	A	1R	1R	1R	1R	A	A	A	0 / 8	1–8	11%
French Open	A	2R	1R	A	1R	QF	1R	1R	1R	A	1R	A		0 / 8	4–8	33%
Wimbledon	A	1R	2R	A	2R	1R	NH	1R	1R	A	1R	A		0 / 7	2–7	22%
US Open	2R	1R	2R	1R	2R	A	A	1R	A	A	A	A		0 / 6	3–6	33%
Win–Loss	1–1	1–4	2–4	1–2	2–4	3–2	0–2	0–4	0–3	0–1	0–2	0–0	0–0	0 / 29	10–29	26%

== Significant finals ==
=== Masters 1000 tournaments ===
==== Singles: 1 (1 runner-up) ====
Result	Year	Tournament	Surface	Opponent	Score
Loss	2019	Monte-Carlo Masters	Clay	(Italy) Fabio Fognini	3–6, 4–6

== ATP Tour finals ==
=== Singles: 3 (2 titles, 1 runner-up) ===
Legend Grand Slam (0–0) ATP Masters 1000 (0–1) ATP 500 (0–0) ATP 250 (2–0)	Finals by surface Hard (0–0) Clay (2–1) Grass (0–0)	Finals by setting Outdoor (2–1) Indoor (0–0)

Result	W–L	Date	Tournament	Tier	Surface	Opponent	Score
Loss	0–1	Apr 2019	Monte-Carlo Masters, Monaco	Masters 1000	Clay	(Italy) Fabio Fognini	3–6, 4–6
Win	1–1	Jul 2019	Croatia Open Umag, Croatia	ATP 250	Clay	(Hungary) Attila Balázs	7–5, 7–5
Win	2–1	Apr 2023	Banja Luka Open, Bosnia and Herzegovina	ATP 250	Clay	Andrey Rublev	6–3, 4–6, 6–4

=== Doubles: 3 (2 titles, 1 runner-up) ===
Legend Grand Slam (0–0) ATP Masters 1000 (0–0) ATP 500 (0–0) ATP 250 (2–1)	Finals by surface Hard (1–0) Clay (1–1) Grass (0–0)	Finals by setting Outdoor (2–1) Indoor (0–0)

Result	W–L	Date	Tournament	Tier	Surface	Partner	Opponents	Score
Loss	0–1	Jul 2014	Croatia Open Umag, Croatia	ATP 250	Clay	(Croatia) Franko Škugor	(Czech Republic) František Čermák (Czech Republic) Lukáš Rosol	4–6, 6–7^{(5–7)}
Win	1–1	May 2015	Istanbul Open, Turkey	ATP 250	Clay	(Moldova) Radu Albot	(Sweden) Robert Lindstedt (Austria) Jürgen Melzer	6–4, 7–6^{(7–2)}
Win	2–1	Sep 2019	Chengdu Open, China	ATP 250	Hard	(Serbia) Nikola Ćaćić	(Israel) Jonathan Erlich (France) Fabrice Martin	7–6^{(11–9)}, 3–6, [10–3]

== Team competition ==
=== Finals: 2 (1 title, 1 runner–up) ===
Result	W–L	Date	Team competition	Surface	Partner/Team	Opponents	Score
Loss	0–1	Nov 2013	Davis Cup, Belgrade, Serbia	Hard (i)	(Serbia) Novak Djokovic (Serbia) Nenad Zimonjić (Serbia) Ilija Bozoljac	(Czech Republic) Tomáš Berdych (Czech Republic) Radek Štěpánek (Czech Republic) Lukáš Rosol (Czech Republic) Jan Hájek	2–3
Win	1–1	Jan 2020	ATP Cup, Sydney, Australia	Hard	(Serbia) Novak Djokovic (Serbia) Nikola Milojević (Serbia) Viktor Troicki (Serbia) Nikola Ćaćić	(Spain) Rafael Nadal (Spain) Roberto Bautista Agut (Spain) Pablo Carreño Busta (Spain) Albert Ramos Viñolas (Spain) Feliciano López	2–1

== ATP Challenger and ITF Futures finals ==
=== Singles: 20 (13 titles, 7 runner–ups) ===
Legend ATP Challenger Tour (8–4) ITF Futures (5–3)	Finals by surface Hard (4–0) Clay (9–7)

Result	W–L	Date	Tournament	Tier	Surface	Opponent	Score
Win	1–0	Aug 2009	Serbia F5, Sombor	Futures	Clay	(Serbia) Aleksandar Slović	6–3, 6–4
Loss	1–1	Jun 2010	Serbia F1, Belgrade	Futures	Clay	(Ukraine) Oleksandr Nedovyesov	4–6, 2–6
Win	2–1	Aug 2010	Serbia F4, Novi Sad	Futures	Clay	(Bosnia and Herzegovina) Aldin Šetkić	6–0, 4–6, 6–3
Loss	2–2	Aug 2010	Italy F22, Este	Futures	Clay	(Italy) Matteo Viola	5–7, 1–6
Loss	2–3	Oct 2010	Egypt F5, Cairo	Futures	Clay	(Serbia) Miljan Zekić	1–6, 6–3, 4–6
Win	3–3	Mar 2011	Italy F2, Cividino	Futures	Hard	(Italy) Andrea Stoppini	3–6, 6–4, 6–3
Win	4–3	Mar 2011	Italy F3, Foggia	Futures	Clay	(Italy) Walter Trusendi	6–2, 6–7^{(7–9)}, 6–2
Win	5–3	Oct 2011	Croatia F10, Umag	Futures	Clay	(Russia) Andrey Kuznetsov	6–4, 0–6, 7–5
Loss	0–1	Jul 2012	Orbetello, Italy	Challenger	Clay	(Spain) Roberto Bautista Agut	3–6, 1–6
Win	1–1	Aug 2012	Samarkand, Uzbekistan	Challenger	Clay	(Uzbekistan) Farrukh Dustov	6–3, 6–2
Win	2–1	Jun 2013	Caltanissetta, Italy	Challenger	Clay	(Netherlands) Robin Haase	7–6^{(7–4)}, 6–3
Loss	2–2	Jun 2013	Blois, France	Challenger	Clay	(Germany) Julian Reister	1–6, 7–6^{(7–3)}, 6–7^{(2–7)}
Win	3–2	Nov 2013	Seoul, South Korea	Challenger	Hard	(Germany) Julian Reister	walkover
Win	4–2	Sep 2015	Banja Luka, Bosnia and Herzegovina	Challenger	Hard	(Romania) Victor Hănescu	7–6^{(7–5)}, 7–6^{(7–5)}
Win	5–2	Jul 2017	Båstad, Sweden	Challenger	Clay	(Argentina) Leonardo Mayer	6–2, 7–6^{(7–4)}
Win	6–2	Apr 2018	Le Gosier, Guadeloupe	Challenger	Hard	(United States) Denis Kudla	6–4, 6–0
Win	7–2	Dec 2022	Maspalomas, Spain	Challenger	Clay	(Canada) Steven Diez	6–1, 6–4
Loss	7-3	Jun 2025	Sassuolo, Italy	Challenger	Clay	(Spain) Carlos Taberner	7–6^{(7–1)}, 6–2
Win	8–3	Aug 2025	Cordenons, Italy	Challenger	Clay	(Austria) Lukas Neumayer	6–2, 7–6^{(7–3)}
Loss	8–4	Sep 2026	Sevilla, Spain	Challenger	Clay	(Argentina) Facundo Díaz Acosta	2–6, 1–6

=== Doubles: 6 (4 titles, 2 runner–ups) ===
Legend ATP Challenger Tour (0–1) ITF Futures (4–1)	Finals by surface Hard (0–0) Clay (4–2) Grass (0–0) Carpet (0–0)

Result	W–L	Date	Tournament	Tier	Surface	Partner	Opponents	Score
Win	1–0	Jun 2008	ITF Serbia, Belgrade	Futures	Clay	(Serbia) Nikola Ćaćić	(Serbia) David Savić (Serbia) Miljan Zekić	7–6^{(8–6)}, 3–6, [10–8]
Loss	1–1	Oct 2009	ITF Egypt, Cairo	Futures	Clay	(Serbia) Nikola Ćirić	(Spain) Óscar Burrieza López (Spain) Javier Martí	4–6, 6–1, [9–11]
Win	2–1	May 2010	ITF Bosnia and Herzegovina, Sarajevo	Futures	Clay	(Serbia) Miljan Zekić	(Bosnia and Herzegovina) Mirza Bašić (Bosnia and Herzegovina) Zlatan Kadrić	6–3, 6–4
Win	3–1	Aug 2010	ITF Serbia, Novi Sad	Futures	Clay	(Serbia) Ilija Vučić	(Mexico) Javier Herrera-Eguiluz (Australia) Brendan Moore	7–5, 5–7, [10–8]
Win	4–1	Oct 2010	ITF Egypt, Cairo	Futures	Clay	(Serbia) Miljan Zekić	(Russia) Aleksandr Lobkov (Russia) Alexander Rumyantsev	7–6^{(7–5)}, 7–6^{(10–8)}
Loss	0–1	Sep 2015	Sibiu, Romania	Challenger	Clay	(Serbia) Ilija Bozoljac	(Romania) Victor Crivoi (Romania) Petru-Alexandru Luncanu	4–6, 3–6

== Top 10 wins ==
- He has a 10–31 record against players who were, at the time the match was played, ranked in the top 10.

Season	2018	2019	2020	2021	2022	2023	2024	Total
Wins	2	2	0	1	1	4	0	10

#	Player	Rank	Event	Surface	Rd	Score	DLR
2018
1.	(Argentina) Juan Martín del Potro	6	Madrid Open, Spain	Clay	3R	3–6, 6–4, 7–6^{(8–6)}	95
2.	(Bulgaria) Grigor Dimitrov	8	China Open, China	Hard	2R	6–4, 2–6, 6–4	55
2019
3.	(Japan) Kei Nishikori	6	Miami Open, United States	Hard	2R	2–6, 6–2, 6–3	44
4.	(Austria) Dominic Thiem	5	Monte-Carlo Masters, Monaco	Clay	3R	6–3, 6–3	48
2021
5.	(Russia) Daniil Medvedev	3	Rotterdam Open, Netherlands	Hard (i)	1R	7–6^{(7–4)}, 6–4	27
2022
6.	(Norway) Casper Ruud	7	Madrid Open, Spain	Clay	2R	7–6^{(9–7)}, 2–6, 6–4	77
2023
7.	(Serbia) Novak Djokovic	1	Banja Luka Open, Bosnia and Herzegovina	Clay	QF	6–4, 7–6^{(8–6)}	70
8.	Andrey Rublev	6	Banja Luka Open, Bosnia and Herzegovina	Clay	F	6–3, 4–6, 6–4	70
9.	(Canada) Félix Auger-Aliassime	9	Madrid Open, Spain	Clay	2R	6–2, 3–6, 7–6^{(7–5)}	40
10.	(Italy) Jannik Sinner	6	Cincinnati Open, United States	Hard	2R	6–4, 7–6^{(7–4)}	66

* As of 15 February 2025

== Exhibitions matches ==
=== Singles ===
Result	Date	Tournament	Surface	Opponent	Score
Win	Jun 2023	Boodles Challenge, United Kingdom	Grass	(Greece) Stefanos Tsitsipas	6–7^{(3–7)}, 6–4, [10–7]
Win	Jul 2023	Boodles Challenge, United Kingdom	Grass	(Argentina) Diego Schwartzman	6–4, 3–6, [10–8]

== See also ==
- Serbia Davis Cup team
- List of Serbia Davis Cup team representatives
- Sport in Serbia
