= Simone Vagnozzi =

Italian tennis player (born 1983)

- Country (sports): Italy
- Residence: Castorano, Italy
- Born: 30 May 1983 (age 43) Ascoli Piceno, Italy
- Height: 1.73 m (5 ft 8 in)
- Turned pro: 1999
- Retired: 2015
- Plays: Right-handed (two-handed backhand)
- Coach: Massimo Sartori
- Prize money: $490,569

Singles
- Career record: 4–7
- Career titles: 0
- Highest ranking: No. 161 (7 November 2011)

Grand Slam singles results
- Australian Open: Q2 (2008, 2009, 2011)
- French Open: Q2 (2007, 2012)
- Wimbledon: Q2 (2012)
- US Open: Q3 (2010)

Doubles
- Career record: 6–16
- Career titles: 0
- Highest ranking: No. 74 (4 April 2011)

Grand Slam doubles results
- Australian Open: 1R (2012)
- French Open: 1R (2011)
- Wimbledon: 1R (2011)
- US Open: 1R (2010)

Coaching career
- Jannik Sinner (2022–)

Coaching achievements
- List of notable tournaments (with champion): 2026 Wimbledon (Sinner); 2025 ATP Finals (Sinner); 2025 Wimbledon (Sinner); 2025 Australian Open (Sinner); 2024 ATP Finals (Sinner); 2024 US Open (Sinner); 2024 Australian Open (Sinner)
- Last updated on: 16 May 2021.

Simone Vagnozzi (Italian pronunciation: [siˈmoːne vaɲˈɲɔttsi]; born 30 May 1983) is an Italian former professional tennis player. Alongside Darren Cahill, he is currently the coach of fellow Italian ATP player Jannik Sinner. Both received the Coach of the Year award at the 2023 ATP Awards.

Vagnozzi had a career high ATP singles ranking of world No. 161 achieved on 7 November 2011. He also had a career high ATP doubles ranking of world No. 74 achieved on 4 April 2011.

Vagnozzi made his ATP Tour singles debut at the 2004 Grand Prix Hassan II on clay courts in Casablanca, Morocco when he successfully advanced through three qualifying rounds to reach his first career main draw. In qualifying he defeated Talal Ouahabi, followed by leading Thomas Shimada 6–0, 2–0 when he had to retire from the match, and finally Björn Rehnquist to gain a main draw birth. In the first round he would go on extend his winning streak to four matches by defeating Jean-René Lisnard in straight sets but would ultimately fall in the second round to Swiss player Ivo Heuberger. He made his ATP Tour doubles debut at the 2005 Croatia Open where he received a direct entry alongside Ladislav Švarc of Slovakia. They were defeated in the first round by an 18-year-old Novak Djokovic and Janko Tipsarević.

Vagnozzi reached 24 singles finals in his career, posting a record of 8 wins and 16 losses which includes a 1–3 record in ATP Challenger finals. Additionally, he reached 54 doubles finals across his career with a record of 28 wins and 26 losses which includes a 16–21 record in ATP Challenger finals. He reached 1 career doubles final on the ATP Tour at the 2010 Swedish Open alongside compatriot Andreas Seppi. They were defeated by Robert Lindstedt and Horia Tecău in straight sets.

== ATP Tour career finals ==
=== Doubles: 1 (1 runner-up) ===
Legend Grand Slam tournaments (0–0) ATP World Tour Finals (0–0) ATP World Tour Masters 1000 (0–0) ATP World Tour 500 Series (0–0) ATP World Tour 250 Series (0–1)	Finals by surface Hard (0–0) Clay (0–1) Grass (0–0)

Result	W–L	Date	Tournament	Tier	Surface	Partner	Opponents	Score
Loss	0–1	Jul 2010	Swedish Open, Sweden	250 Series	Clay	(Italy) Andreas Seppi	(Sweden) Robert Lindstedt (Romania) Horia Tecău	4–6, 5–7

== ATP Challenger and ITF Futures finals ==
=== Singles: 24 (8–16) ===
Legend ATP Challenger (1–3) ITF Futures (7–13)	Finals by surface Hard (0–0) Clay (8–16) Grass (0–0) Carpet (0–0)

Result	W–L	Date	Tournament	Tier	Surface	Opponent	Score
Loss	0–1	Oct 2005	Chile F4, Santiago	Futures	Clay	(Argentina) Máximo González	5–7, 6–1, 3–6
Loss	0–2	Jan 2006	Spain F3, Llucmajor	Futures	Clay	(Italy) Francesco Piccari	6–7^{(3–7)}, 6–7^{(4–7)}
Loss	0–3	Jun 2007	Bytom, Poland	Challenger	Clay	(Australia) Peter Luczak	3–6, 3–6
Win	1–3	Sep 2007	Italy F33, Sardegna	Futures	Clay	(Italy) Matteo Marrai	3–6, 6–1, 6–0
Win	2–3	Oct 2007	Italy F34, Sassari	Futures	Clay	(Hungary) Ádám Kellner	1–6, 6–1, 6–1
Loss	2–4	Apr 2008	Italy F10, Padova	Futures	Clay	(Croatia) Antonio Veić	2–6, 7–6^{(7–4)}, 3–6
Loss	2–5	Jun 2008	Alessandria, Italy	Challenger	Clay	(Italy) Paolo Lorenzi	6–4, 6–7^{(5–7)}, 6–7^{(4–7)}
Win	3–5	Oct 2008	Croatia F10, Dubrovnik	Futures	Clay	(Slovenia) Grega Žemlja	6–3, 6–4
Win	4–5	Feb 2009	Egypt F2, Cairo	Futures	Clay	(Italy) Daniele Giorgini	7–6^{(7–3)}, 5–7, 6–4
Loss	4–6	May 2009	Italy F10, Pozzuoli	Futures	Clay	(Belgium) Yannick Mertens	2–6, 2–6
Loss	4–7	Jun 2009	Serbia F1, Belgrade	Futures	Clay	(Serbia) Nikola Ćirić	6–4, 6–7^{(5–7)}, 5–7
Loss	4–8	Jul 2009	Italy F19, Palazzolo	Futures	Clay	(Chile) Guillermo Hormazábal	5–7, 0–6
Loss	4–9	May 2010	Cairo, Egypt	Challenger	Clay	(Czech Republic) Ivo Minář	6–3, 2–6, 3–6
Loss	4–10	May 2010	Italy F8, Pozzuoli	Futures	Clay	(Italy) Alessio di Mauro	5–7, 4–6
Win	5–10	Jun 2010	Marburg, Germany	Challenger	Clay	(Czech Republic) Ivo Minář	2–6, 6–3, 7–5
Loss	5–11	Mar 2011	Spain F7, Sabadell	Futures	Clay	(Russia) Evgeny Donskoy	5–7, 5–7
Win	6–11	Aug 2012	Italy F22, Appiano	Futures	Clay	(Chile) Jorge Aguilar	6–4, 7–6^{(7–5)}
Loss	6–12	Mar 2013	Turkey F10, Antalya	Futures	Clay	(Italy) Lorenzo Giustino	0–6, 3–6
Loss	6–13	May 2013	Sweden F2, Båstad	Futures	Clay	(Italy) Roberto Marcora	3–6, 5–7
Loss	6–14	Jun 2013	Slovenia F3, Litija	Futures	Clay	(France) Axel Michon	0–6, 4–6
Win	7–14	Jun 2013	Italy F13, Busto Arsizio	Futures	Clay	(Czech Republic) Dušan Lojda	4–6, 6–3, 6–0
Loss	7–15	Oct 2013	Italy F30, Palermo	Futures	Clay	(Italy) Alessio di Mauro	3–6, 3–6
Win	8–15	Mar 2014	Italy F4, Palermo	Futures	Clay	(France) Maxime Chazal	6–3, 6–2
Loss	8–16	Mar 2014	Croatia F5, Umag	Futures	Clay	(Morocco) Lamine Ouahab	0–6, 7–6^{(8–6)}, 3–6

=== Doubles: 53 (28–25) ===
Legend ATP Challenger (16–21) ITF Futures (12–4)	Finals by surface Hard (3–3) Clay (25–22) Grass (0–0) Carpet (0–0)

Result	W–L	Date	Tournament	Tier	Surface	Partner	Opponents	Score
Loss	0–1	Aug 2003	San Benedetto, Italy	Challenger	Clay	(Italy) Daniele Giorgini	(Australia) Todd Perry (Japan) Thomas Shimada	3–6, 4–6
Win	1–1	Oct 2003	France F20, Saint-Dizier	Futures	Hard	(Italy) Flavio Cipolla	(Sweden) Tobias Steinel-Hansson (Germany) Aleksey Malajko	4–6, 6–3, 6–2
Win	2–1	May 2004	Italy F9, Teramo	Futures	Clay	(Italy) Alessandro Motti	(Brazil) Rodrigo Monte (Brazil) Márcio Torres	3–0 ret.
Loss	2–2	Jun 2004	Reggio Emilia, Italy	Challenger	Clay	(Italy) Andreas Seppi	(Germany) Tomas Behrend (Italy) Tomas Tenconi	4–6, 2–6
Loss	2–3	Aug 2004	St. Petersburg, Russia	Challenger	Clay	(Italy) Daniele Giorgini	(Russia) Mikhail Elgin (Russia) Andrei Mishin	3–6, 7–5, 4–6
Loss	2–4	Mar 2005	Italy F3, Siracuse	Futures	Clay	(Italy) Cristian Brandi	(Italy) Alessandro Motti (Italy) Flavio Cipolla	5–7, 4–6
Loss	2–5	Jun 2005	Sassuolo, Italy	Challenger	Clay	(Chile) Paul Capdeville	(Argentina) Juan Pablo Brzezicki (Argentina) Cristian Villagrán	6–7^{(5–7)}, 2–6
Win	3–5	Jun 2005	Italy F18, Castelfranco	Futures	Clay	(Italy) Flavio Cipolla	(Switzerland) Benjamin-David Rufer (Switzerland) Stefan Kilchhofer	7–6^{(7–1)}, 6–3
Loss	3–6	Jan 2006	Spain F3, Llucmajor	Futures	Clay	(Italy) Federico Torresi	(Spain) Gabriel Trujillo Soler (Spain) M P Puigdomenech	3–6, 3–6
Win	4–6	Feb 2006	Italy F2, Trento	Futures	Hard	(Italy) Thomas Holzer	(Italy) Alberto Brizzi (Italy) Leonardo Azzaro	6–4, 6–3
Win	5–6	Mar 2006	Italy F3, Rome	Futures	Clay	(Italy) Alberto Brizzi	(Italy) Giancarlo Petrazzuolo (Italy) Daniele Giorgini	6–7^{(1–7)}, 6–1, 6–2
Win	6–6	Jan 2007	La Serena, Chile	Challenger	Clay	(Spain) Marc López	(Argentina) Carlos Berlocq (Argentina) Brian Dabul	3–6, 6–3, [10–1]
Loss	6–7	Mar 2007	Barletta, Italy	Challenger	Clay	(Italy) Alessandro Motti	(Spain) David Marrero (Spain) Albert Portas	4–6, 4–6
Win	7–7	Sep 2007	Como, Italy	Challenger	Clay	(Argentina) Máximo González	(Italy) Flavio Cipolla (Italy) Marco Pedrini	7–6^{(7–5)}, 6–4
Win	8–7	Sep 2007	Genoa, Italy	Challenger	Clay	(Italy) Daniele Giorgini	(Italy) Flavio Cipolla (Italy) Simone Bolelli	6–3, 6–1
Win	9–7	Jan 2008	New Caledonia Challenger	Challenger	Hard	(Italy) Flavio Cipolla	(Czech Republic) Jan Mertl (Austria) Martin Slanar	6–4, 6–4
Win	10–7	Apr 2008	Italy F10, Padova	Futures	Clay	(Brazil) Caio Zampieri	(Ukraine) Alexandr Dolgopolov (Russia) Denis Matsukevich	7–5, 7–6^{(7–2)}
Win	11–7	May 2008	Rome, Italy	Challenger	Clay	(Italy) Flavio Cipolla	(Italy) Paolo Lorenzi (Italy) Giancarlo Petrazzuolo	6–3, 6–3
Win	12–7	Jun 2008	Alessandria, Italy	Challenger	Clay	(Italy) Flavio Cipolla	(Netherlands) Melle van Gemerden (Netherlands) Matwé Middelkoop	3–6, 6–1, [10–4]
Loss	12–8	Jun 2008	Constanța, Romania	Challenger	Clay	(Brazil) Júlio Silva	(Romania) Florin Mergea (Romania) Horia Tecău	4–6, 2–6
Win	13–8	Feb 2009	Egypt F1, Giza	Futures	Clay	(Italy) Daniele Giorgini	(Morocco) Rabie Chaki (Morocco) Talal Ouahabi	2–6, 6–1, [10–3]
Loss	13–9	Feb 2009	Egypt F2, Cairo	Futures	Clay	(Italy) Daniele Giorgini	(Egypt) Sherif Sabry (Egypt) Karim Maamoun	1–6, 4–6
Loss	13–10	Feb 2009	Tanger, Morocco	Challenger	Clay	(Italy) Giancarlo Petrazzuolo	(France) Augustin Gensse (France) Éric Prodon	1–6, 6–7^{(3–7)}
Loss	13–11	Mar 2009	Caltanissetta, Italy	Challenger	Clay	(Italy) Daniele Bracciali	(Argentina) Juan Pablo Brzezicki (Spain) David Marrero	6–7^{(5–7)}, 3–6
Loss	13–12	Jul 2009	Italy F19, Palazzolo	Futures	Clay	(Italy) Mattia Livraghi	(Italy) Claudio Grassi (Chile) Guillermo Hormazábal	5–7, 3–6
Loss	13–13	Aug 2009	Tampere, Finland	Challenger	Clay	(Italy) Uros Vico	(Australia) Peter Luczak (Kazakhstan) Yuri Schukin	1–6, 7–6^{(8–6)}, [4–10]
Win	14–13	Aug 2009	Manerbio, Italy	Challenger	Clay	(Italy) Alessio di Mauro	(Switzerland) Yves Allegro (Netherlands) Jesse Huta Galung	6–4, 3–6, [10–4]
Loss	14–14	Sep 2009	Brașov, Romania	Challenger	Clay	(Italy) Uros Vico	(Spain) Pere Riba (Spain) Pablo Santos González	3–6, 2–6
Loss	14–15	Sep 2009	Seville, Spain	Challenger	Clay	(Italy) Alberto Brizzi	(Philippines) Treat Huey (India) Harsh Mankad	1–6, 5–7
Loss	14–16	Sep 2009	Banja Luka, Bosnia & Herzegovina	Challenger	Clay	(Bosnia and Herzegovina) Ismar Gorčić	(Jamaica) Dustin Brown (Austria) Rainer Eitzinger	4–6, 3–6
Loss	14–17	Sep 2009	Ljubljana, Slovenia	Challenger	Clay	(France) Stéphane Robert	(United Kingdom) Jamie Delgado (United Kingdom) Jamie Murray	3–6, 3–6
Loss	14–18	Jan 2010	New Caledonia Challenger	Challenger	Hard	(Italy) Flavio Cipolla	(France) Édouard Roger-Vasselin (France) Nicolas Devilder	7–5, 2–6, [6–10]
Win	15–18	Jan 2010	Morocco F1, Casablanca	Futures	Clay	(Italy) Alberto Brizzi	(Hungary) Ádám Kellner (Slovakia) Martin Kližan	6–3, 6–2
Win	16–18	Apr 2010	Italy F3, Foggia	Futures	Clay	(Italy) Alessio di Mauro	(Argentina) Diego Álvarez (Argentina) Agustin Picco	6–4, 6–0
Loss	16–19	Apr 2010	Blumenau, Brazil	Challenger	Clay	(Brazil) André Ghem	(Brazil) André Sá (Brazil) Franco Ferreiro	4–6, 3–6
Win	17–19	May 2010	Cairo, Egypt	Challenger	Clay	(Austria) Martin Slanar	(Germany) Andre Begemann (Jamaica) Dustin Brown	6–3, 6–4
Win	18–19	Jul 2010	Braunschweig, Germany	Challenger	Clay	(Portugal) Leonardo Tavares	(Kazakhstan) Yuri Schukin (Russia) Igor Kunitsyn	7–5, 7–6^{(7–4)}
Win	19–19	Oct 2010	Napoli, Italy	Challenger	Clay	(Spain) Daniel Muñoz de la Nava	(Germany) Bastian Knittel (Austria) Andreas Haider-Maurer	1–6, 7–6^{(7–5)}, [10–6]
Loss	19–20	Oct 2010	Palermo, Italy	Challenger	Clay	(Italy) Alessandro Motti	(Austria) Philipp Oswald (Austria) Martin Fischer	6–4, 2–6, [6–10]
Loss	19–21	Jan 2011	New Caledonia Challenger	Challenger	Hard	(Italy) Flavio Cipolla	(Germany) Dominik Meffert (Denmark) Frederik Nielsen	6–7^{(4–7)}, 7–5, [5–10]
Win	20–21	Feb 2011	Meknes, Morocco	Challenger	Clay	(Philippines) Treat Huey	(Italy) Alessandro Motti (Italy) Alessio di Mauro	6–1, 6–2
Loss	20–22	Feb 2011	Casablanca, Morocco	Challenger	Clay	(Portugal) Leonardo Tavares	(Spain) Guillermo Alcaide (Spain) Adrián Menéndez Maceiras	2–6, 1–6
Win	21–22	Mar 2011	Spain F7, Sabadell	Futures	Clay	(Italy) Daniele Giorgini	(Spain) M A López Jaén (Spain) Gabriel Trujillo Soler	6–3, 6–2
Win	22–22	Mar 2011	Rabat, Morocco	Challenger	Clay	(Italy) Alessio di Mauro	(Kazakhstan) Evgeny Korolev (Kazakhstan) Yuri Schukin	6–4, 6–4
Win	23–22	Mar 2011	Caltanissetta, Italy	Challenger	Clay	(Italy) Daniele Bracciali	(Italy) Daniele Giorgini (Romania) Adrian Ungur	3–6, 7–6^{(7–2)}, [10–7]
Win	24–22	Jun 2011	Milan, Italy	Challenger	Clay	(Spain) Adrián Menéndez Maceiras	(Portugal) Leonardo Tavares (Italy) Andrea Arnaboldi	0–6, 6–3, [10–5]
Win	25–22	Aug 2011	San Sebastián, Spain	Challenger	Clay	(Italy) Stefano Ianni	(Spain) Israel Sevilla (Spain) Daniel Gimeno Traver	6–3, 6–4
Loss	25–23	Oct 2011	Orleans, France	Challenger	Hard	(Czech Republic) David Škoch	(France) Pierre-Hugues Herbert (France) Nicolas Renavand	5–7, 3–6
Loss	25–24	Apr 2012	Mersin, Turkey	Challenger	Clay	(Italy) Alessandro Motti	(Moldova) Radu Albot (Ukraine) Denys Molchanov	0–6, 2–6
Loss	25–25	Jul 2012	Orbetello, Italy	Challenger	Clay	(Italy) Alessio di Mauro	(Italy) Stefano Ianni (Australia) Dane Propoggia	3–6, 2–6
Win	26–25	Feb 2013	Spain F1, Mallorca	Futures	Clay	(Italy) Alessio di Mauro	(Spain) M A López Jaén (Spain) J Marse-Vidri	6–0, 6–3
Win	27–25	Jul 2013	Orbetello, Italy	Challenger	Clay	(Italy) Marco Crugnola	(Argentina) Renzo Olivo (Argentina) Guillermo Durán	7–6^{(7–3)}, 6–7^{(5–7)}, [10–6]
Win	28–25	Jul 2014	Denmark F1, Aarhus	Futures	Clay	(Italy) Matteo Donati	(Sweden) Christian Lindell (Sweden) Robin Olin	6–1, 6–0

== Performance timelines ==
Key
W	F	SF	QF	#R	RR	Q#	DNQ	A	NH

(W) winner; (F) finalist; (SF) semifinalist; (QF) quarterfinalist; (#R) rounds 4, 3, 2, 1; (RR) round-robin stage; (Q#) qualification round; (DNQ) did not qualify; (A) absent; (NH) not held; (SR) strike rate (events won / competed); (W–L) win–loss record.

=== Singles ===
Tournament	2006	2007	2008	2009	2010	2011	2012	2013	2014	SR	W–L
Grand Slam tournaments
Australian Open	A	Q1	Q2	Q2	Q1	Q2	Q1	A	Q1	0 / 0	0–0
French Open	A	Q2	A	A	A	Q1	Q2	A	A	0 / 0	0–0
Wimbledon	Q1	Q1	A	A	Q1	A	Q2	A	A	0 / 0	0–0
US Open	Q1	A	A	A	Q3	A	A	A	A	0 / 0	0–0
Win–loss	0–0	0–0	0–0	0–0	0–0	0–0	0–0	0–0	0–0	0 / 0	0–0
ATP Tour Masters 1000
Miami Open	A	A	A	A	A	A	Q1	A	A	0 / 0	0–0
Italian Open	A	A	Q1	A	A	A	A	A	A	0 / 0	0–0
Hamburg	A	A	Q1	Not Masters Series						0 / 0	0–0
Win–loss	0–0	0–0	0–0	0–0	0–0	0–0	0–0	0–0	0–0	0 / 0	0–0

=== Doubles ===
Tournament	2010	2011	2012	SR	W–L	Win %
Grand Slam tournaments
Australian Open	A	A	1R	0 / 1	0–1	0%
French Open	A	1R	A	0 / 1	0–1	0%
Wimbledon	Q1	1R	A	0 / 1	0–1	0%
US Open	1R	A	A	0 / 1	0–1	0%
Win–loss	0–1	0–2	0–1	0 / 4	0–4	0%

Awards and achievements
Preceded by (Spain) Juan Carlos Ferrero	ATP Coach of the Year; 2023 (with (Australia) Darren Cahill)	Succeeded by (United States) Michael Russell
