= Orbetello Challenger =

Tennis tournament

Defunct tennis tournament
- Event name: Orbetello Challenger
- Location: Orbetello, Italy
- Venue: Circolo Tennis Orbetello
- Category: ATP Challenger Tour
- Surface: Clay (red)
- Draw: 32S/29Q/16D
- Prize money: €85,000+H
- Website: Website

The Orbetello Challenger was a professional tennis tournament played on outdoor red clay courts. It was part of the Association of Tennis Professionals (ATP) Challenger Tour. It was held annually in Orbetello, Italy, from 2009 to 2013.

A new tournament named International Tennis Tournament of Cortina, held in Cortina d'Ampezzo, Italy, took its place in the schedule in 2014.

== Past finals ==
=== Singles ===
| Year | Champion | Runner-up | Score |
|---|---|---|---|
| 2013 | (Italy) Filippo Volandri | (Spain) Pere Riba | 6–4, 7–6^{(9–7)} |
| 2012 | (Spain) Roberto Bautista Agut | (Serbia) Dušan Lajović | 6–3, 6–1 |
| 2011 | (Italy) Filippo Volandri | (Italy) Matteo Viola | 4–6, 6–3, 6–2 |
| 2010 | (Spain) Pablo Andújar | (France) Édouard Roger-Vasselin | 6–4, 6–3 |
| 2009 | (Ukraine) Oleksandr Dolgopolov Jr. | (Spain) Pablo Andújar | 6–4, 6–2 |

=== Doubles ===
| Year | Champions | Runners-up | Score |
|---|---|---|---|
| 2013 | (Italy) Marco Crugnola (Italy) Simone Vagnozzi | (Argentina) Guillermo Durán (Argentina) Renzo Olivo | 7–6^{(7–3)}, 6–7^{(5–7)}, [10–6] |
| 2012 | (Italy) Stefano Ianni (Australia) Dane Propoggia | (Italy) Alessio di Mauro (Italy) Simone Vagnozzi | 6–3, 6–2 |
| 2011 | (Austria) Julian Knowle (Slovakia) Igor Zelenay | (France) Romain Jouan (France) Benoît Paire | 6–1, 7–6^{(7–2)} |
| 2010 | (Italy) Alessio di Mauro (Italy) Alessandro Motti | (Croatia) Nikola Mektić (Croatia) Ivan Zovko | 6–2, 3–6, [10–3] |
| 2009 | (Italy) Paolo Lorenzi (Italy) Giancarlo Petrazzuolo | (Italy) Alessio di Mauro (Italy) Manuel Jorquera | 7–6(5), 3–6, [10–6] |
