= Pablo Andújar =

Spanish tennis player (born 1986)

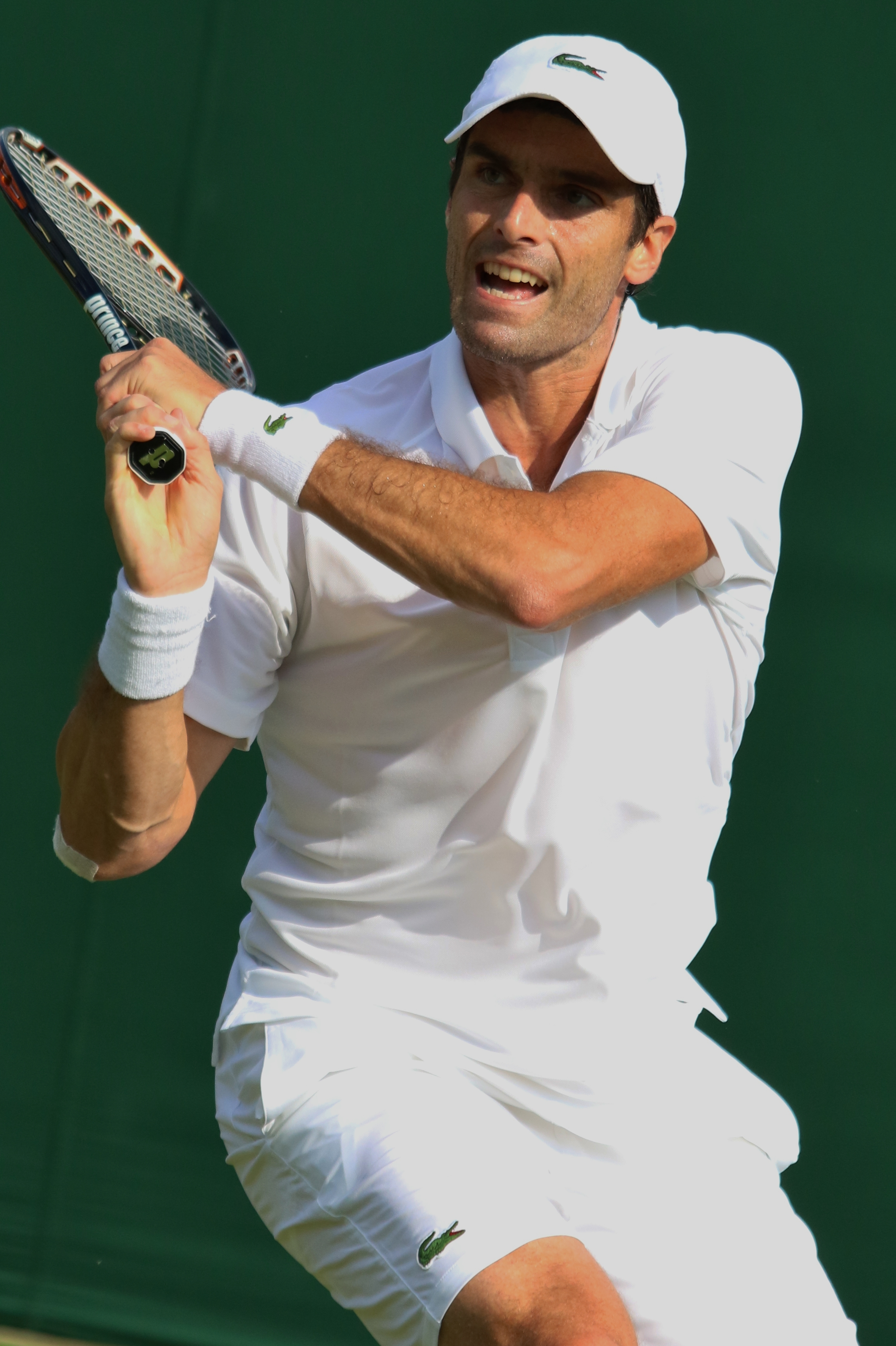
- Andújar at the 2019 Wimbledon Championships
- Country (sports): Spain
- Residence: Valencia, Spain
- Born: 23 January 1986 (age 40) Cuenca, Spain
- Height: 1.80 m (5 ft 11 in)
- Turned pro: 2004
- Retired: 2023
- Plays: Right-handed (two-handed backhand)
- Coach: Marcos Esparcia
- Prize money: US $7,026,566

Singles
- Career record: 163–242
- Career titles: 4
- Highest ranking: No. 32 (13 July 2015)

Grand Slam singles results
- Australian Open: 3R (2022)
- French Open: 3R (2015)
- Wimbledon: 3R (2015)
- US Open: 4R (2019)

Other tournaments
- Olympic Games: 1R (2020)

Doubles
- Career record: 75–126
- Career titles: 0
- Highest ranking: No. 74 (3 December 2012)
- Current ranking: No. 372 (24 April 2023)

Grand Slam doubles results
- Australian Open: 3R (2016, 2018, 2022)
- French Open: SF (2021)
- Wimbledon: 1R (2011, 2012, 2013, 2015)
- US Open: 2R (2011, 2012)

Other doubles tournaments
- Olympic Games: 1R (2020)
- Last updated on: 26 April 2023.

Pablo Andújar Alba (Spanish pronunciation: [ˈpaβlo anˈduxaɾ ˈalβa]; born 23 January 1986) is a Spanish former professional tennis player. Andújar has won four ATP Tour singles titles and reached a career-high singles ranking of world No. 32 in July 2015. His best results are reaching the fourth round of the 2019 US Open and the 2021 French Open doubles semifinals.

== Junior career ==
As a junior, Andújar compiled a singles win–loss record of 67–16 (and 48–14 in doubles), reaching as high as No. 5 in the combined junior world rankings in June 2004.

Junior Slam results:

Australian Open: -
French Open: QF (2004)
Wimbledon: 1R (2004)
US Open: 1R (2004)

== Professional career ==
=== 2008–11: Grand Slam & top 100 debuts, first ATP title & top 50 ===
On his Grand slam debut at the 2008 French Open as a lucky loser he reached the second round defeating Filippo Volandri. In August 2008, following his wins at two consecutive Challengers in Vigo and in San Sebastián, he entered the top 100 on 25 August 2008 at World No. 88.

He competed at the 2009 Australian Open, but lost to Gilles Simon in the first round. At the 2009 French Open, he defeated Robby Ginepri in the first round, but lost in the second round against Paul-Henri Mathieu of France in three sets.

He made the final of the 2010 BCR Open Romania, where he lost to Juan Ignacio Chela.

In 2011, Andújar won his first ATP title at the Grand Prix Hassan II tournament in Morocco, defeating Italian Potito Starace in the final. As a result he entered the top 50 at World No. 48 on 25 April 2011.

The Spaniard reached two more ATP-level finals during the 2011 season, one at the 2011 Stuttgart Open and the other at the 2011 BCR Open Romania.

=== 2012–15: First Masters semifinal & ATP 500 final, two titles, top 35 ===
In January 2012, he was a finalist in doubles with Carlos Berlocq in Viña del Mar, Chile. In February, he was a quarterfinalist in the Abierto Mexicano Telcel.

In April 2012, he won his second title in Morocco, defeating Albert Ramos Viñolas in the final.

In May 2013, as a wildcard and as world No. 113 in the ATP rankings, he reached the semifinals of an ATP World Tour Masters 1000 tournament for the first time in his career in Madrid where he faced Rafael Nadal and lost 6–0, 6–4. His road to the semifinals saw him defeat 10th seed Marin Čilić, John Isner, Daniel Gimeno-Traver and 14th seed Kei Nishikori.

He won his third title at the 2014 Swiss Open defeating Juan Mónaco.

Andújar reached his biggest final at the 2015 Barcelona Open where he was defeated by Kei Nishikori. On 13 July 2015 he reached a career-high singles ranking of No. 32.

=== 2016–18: Hiatus due to surgery, Fourth title & first in four years ===
Between March 2016 and April 2017, Andújar underwent three elbow surgeries with three different doctors and considered retirement if the third surgery didn't work. Upon his return in January 2018, Andújar lost five of his first six matches at all levels.

In April 2018, Andújar won his fourth ATP tournament and his first in for four years, beating Kyle Edmund in straight sets in the final in Marrakesh to become the lowest-ranked tour-level titlist at World No. 355 since then-World No. 550 Lleyton Hewitt at Adelaide in 1998.

=== 2019–21: US Open fourth round, French Open doubles semifinal, Olympics ===
In September 2019, Andújar reached the fourth round of a Grand Slam for the first time, at the 2019 US Open by defeating Kyle Edmund, Lorenzo Sonego and Alexander Bublik in the first three rounds.

In May 2021, ranked No. 75, Andújar upset Roger Federer in three sets at the Geneva Open and reached the semifinals of the event. He lost to eventual champion Casper Ruud.

At the 2021 French Open, he continued his good form by coming back from two sets down to defeat fourth seed Dominic Thiem in the opening round of the tournament. He also reached the semifinals as alternate in doubles with fellow Spaniard Pedro Martínez, with whom he also made his Grand Slam doubles debut as a pair at the 2021 Australian Open. They defeated the 14th seeded Belgians S.Gillé/J.Vliegen in the third round and the pair of Rohan Bopanna/Franko Skugor in the quarterfinals. They entered the tournament as a replacement alternate pair for the top seeds Nikola Mektić/Mate Pavić.

At the 2021 Wimbledon Championships he reached the second round only for the second time in his career.

He qualified to represent Spain in the 2020 Tokyo Olympics in singles and doubles partnering with Roberto Carballés Baena.

In September 2021, he reached the third round of the 2021 US Open only for the second time in his career where he lost to World No. 2 and eventual champion Daniil Medvedev. He finished the year 2021 with a positive record of 5–3 in Grand Slams for the first time in his career.

=== 2022: Australian Open third round ===
Andújar started his 2022 season at the Sydney Classic. He lost in the first round of qualifying to Viktor Durasovic. At the Australian Open, he reached the third round for the first time in his career, thus completing a career set of third rounds at all four Grand Slams. He was defeated in the third round by 32nd seed Alex de Minaur.

In February, Andújar played at the Argentina Open. He lost in the second round to sixth seed Federico Delbonis. At the Rio Open, he beat eighth seed, Albert Ramos Viñolas, in the second round in three sets. He was defeated in his quarterfinal match by third seed, world No. 14, 2018 champion, and eventual finalist, Diego Schwartzman. In Acapulco, he lost in the second round to top seed and world No. 2, Daniil Medvedev. In March, he competed at the BNP Paribas Open. He was beaten in the first round by Fabio Fognini.

Andújar started his clay-court season at the Andalucía Challenger in Marbella. Seeded third, he reached the semifinals where he lost to Pedro Cachin. At the Grand Prix Hassan II in Marrakech, he upset second seed and world No. 26, Dan Evans, in the first round. He lost in the second round to eventual champion David Goffin. In Barcelona, he was defeated in the first round by Ugo Humbert. At the Estoril Open, he retired during his first-round match against Nuno Borges. At the Madrid Open, he fell in the first round of qualifying to Ugo Humbert. Last year semifinalist at the Geneva Open, he lost in the first round to eventual finalist João Sousa. At the French Open, he lost in the first round to 2018 semifinalist, Marco Cecchinato, in five sets.

After Roland Garros, Andújar competed at the UniCredit Czech Open. Seeded fourth, he lost in the second round to eventual champion Vít Kopřiva. Seeded fourth at the Open Sopra Steria de Lyon, he was defeated in the first round by lucky loser Juan Bautista Torres.

At Wimbledon, Andújar lost in the first round to ninth seed, world No. 12, and eventual semifinalist, Cameron Norrie.

After Wimbledon, Andújar played at the Iași Open. As the second seed, he made it to the final where he lost to eighth seed Felipe Meligeni Alves. At the Generali Open Kitzbühel, he beat ninth seed, Lorenzo Sonego, in the first round. He lost in the second round to Austrian wildcard and eventual finalist, Filip Misolic. Seeded second at the first edition of the Kozerki Open, he retired from his second-round match against qualifier Alexey Vatutin due to an arm injury.

Andújar withdrew from the US Open due to the same arm injury he picked up while he was in Grodzisk Mazowiecki.

=== 2023: Retirement ===
Andújar announced on Instagram in December 2022 that the 2023 season will be his last on tour. He started his season at the Maharashtra Open. He lost in the first round to eighth seed Aslan Karatsev. At the Australian Open, he fell in the first round of qualifying to Australian wildcard Adam Walton.

In February, Andújar played at the Córdoba Open. He retired during his first-round match against Argentinian wildcard and 2021 champion, Juan Manuel Cerúndolo, due to a right shoulder injury. At the Open 13 Provence in Marseille, he lost in the first round to qualifier Alexander Ritschard. In March, he competed at the BNP Paribas Open. He was defeated in the final round of qualifying by Borna Gojo.

Andújar began his clay-court season at the Girona Challenger. Playing as a wildcard, he lost in the first round to Miljan Zekić. In Marrakech, he was defeated in the first round of qualifying by Riccardo Bonadio. He accepted a wildcard for the Barcelona Open. He lost in the first round to Tomás Martín Etcheverry. After his first-round loss, he said farewell, hoping to play one more match at the Valencia Challenger. Receiving a wildcard to enter the qualifying round at the Madrid Open, he was eliminated in the first round of qualifying by Zsombor Piros in three sets.

== Performance timelines ==
Key
W	F	SF	QF	#R	RR	Q#	P#	DNQ	A	Z#	PO	G	S	B	NMS	NTI	P	NH

(W) winner; (F) finalist; (SF) semifinalist; (QF) quarterfinalist; (#R) rounds 4, 3, 2, 1; (RR) round-robin stage; (Q#) qualification round; (P#) preliminary round; (DNQ) did not qualify; (A) absent; (Z#) Davis/Fed Cup Zonal Group (with number indication) or (PO) play-off; (G) gold, (S) silver or (B) bronze Olympic/Paralympic medal; (NMS) not a Masters tournament; (NTI) not a Tier I tournament; (P) postponed; (NH) not held; (SR) strike rate (events won / competed); (W–L) win–loss record.
To avoid confusion and double counting, these charts are updated at the conclusion of a tournament or when the player's participation has ended.

=== Singles ===
Tournament	2007	2008	2009	2010	2011	2012	2013	2014	2015	2016	2017	2018	2019	2020	2021	2022	2023	W–L
Grand Slam tournaments
Australian Open	Q1	A	1R	A	1R	2R	1R	2R	1R	1R	A	Q1	1R	1R	2R	3R	Q1	5–11
French Open	Q3	2R	2R	2R	2R	2R	1R	1R	3R	A	A	1R	1R	1R	2R	1R	A	8–13
Wimbledon	Q2	A	1R	A	1R	1R	1R	1R	3R	A	A	A	1R	NH	2R	1R	A	3–8
US Open	A	1R	A	A	1R	2R	2R	2R	1R	A	A	A	4R	1R	3R	A	A	8–9
Win–loss	0–0	1–2	1–3	1–1	1–4	3–4	1–4	2–4	4–4	0–1	0–0	0–1	3–4	0–3	5–3	2–3	0–0	24–41
National representation
Summer Olympics	NH	A	NH			A	NH			A	NH				1R	NH		0–1
ATP Masters 1000
Indian Wells Masters	A	A	A	A	1R	4R	2R	2R	1R	A	A	A	A	NH	1R	1R	Q2	4–7
Miami Open	A	A	A	A	3R	1R	1R	A	1R	A	A	A	2R	NH	A	A	A	3–5
Monte-Carlo Masters	A	A	Q1	A	A	2R	2R	2R	A	A	A	A	A	NH	1R	A	A	3–4
Madrid Open	A	Q1	Q2	A	1R	1R	SF	1R	1R	A	A	1R	A	NH	1R	Q1	Q1	4–7
Italian Open	A	A	A	A	Q1	1R	A	1R	A	A	A	A	A	A	A	A	A	0–2
Canadian Open	A	A	A	A	1R	2R	2R	A	2R	A	A	A	A	NH	A	A	A	3–4
Cincinnati Masters	A	A	A	A	Q1	3R	1R	A	1R	A	A	A	A	A	A	A	A	2–3
Shanghai Masters	NMS			A	1R	1R	2R	1R	A	A	A	A	A	NH			A	1–4
Paris Masters	A	A	A	A	A	1R	2R	1R	A	A	A	A	Q1	1R	A	A	A	1–4
Win–loss	0–0	0–0	0–0	0–0	2–5	7–9	9–8	1–6	1–5	0–0	0–0	0–1	1–1	0–1	0–3	0–1	0–0	21–40
Career statistics
Titles	0	0	0	0	1	1	0	1	0	0	0	1	0	0	0	0	0	4
Finals	0	0	0	1	3	1	0	1	1	0	0	1	1	0	0	0	0	9
Year-end ranking	146	101	160	71	46	42	48	41	64	432	1694	82	64	60	90	123		

=== Doubles ===
Tournament	2008	2009	2010	2011	2012	2013	2014	2015	2016	2017	2018	2019	2020	2021	2022	W–L
Grand Slam tournaments
Australian Open	A	A	A	2R	2R	1R	1R	2R	3R	A	3R	A	1R	1R	3R	9–10
French Open	A	A	A	2R	1R	1R	1R	2R	A	A	A	A	A	SF	1R	6–7
Wimbledon	A	A	A	1R	1R	1R	A	1R	A	A	A	A	NH	A	A	0–4
US Open	1R	A	A	2R	2R	1R	1R	A	A	A	A	1R	A	A	A	2–6
Win–loss	0–1	0–0	0–0	3–4	2–4	0–4	0–3	2–3	2–1	0–0	2–1	0–1	0–1	4–2	2–2	17–27

== ATP career finals ==
=== Singles: 9 (4 titles, 5 runner-ups) ===
Legend Grand Slam tournaments (0–0) ATP World Tour Finals (0–0) ATP World Tour Masters 1000 (0–0) ATP World Tour 500 Series (0–1) ATP World Tour 250 Series (4–4)	Finals by surface Hard (0–0) Clay (4–5) Grass (0–0)	Finals by setting Outdoor (4–5) Indoor (0–0)

Result	W–L	Date	Tournament	Tier	Surface	Opponent	Score
Loss	0–1	Sep 2010	Romanian Open, Romania	250 Series	Clay	(Argentina) Juan Ignacio Chela	5–7, 1–6
Win	1–1	Apr 2011	Grand Prix Hassan II, Morocco	250 Series	Clay	(Italy) Potito Starace	6–1, 6–2
Loss	1–2	Jul 2011	Stuttgart Open, Germany	250 Series	Clay	(Spain) Juan Carlos Ferrero	4–6, 0–6
Loss	1–3	Sep 2011	Romanian Open, Romania	250 Series	Clay	(Germany) Florian Mayer	3–6, 1–6
Win	2–3	Apr 2012	Grand Prix Hassan II, Morocco (2)	250 Series	Clay	(Spain) Albert Ramos Viñolas	6–1, 7–6^{(7–5)}
Win	3–3	Jul 2014	Swiss Open, Switzerland	250 Series	Clay	(Argentina) Juan Mónaco	6–3, 7–5
Loss	3–4	Apr 2015	Barcelona Open, Spain	500 Series	Clay	(Japan) Kei Nishikori	4–6, 4–6
Win	4–4	Apr 2018	Grand Prix Hassan II, Morocco (3)	250 Series	Clay	(United Kingdom) Kyle Edmund	6–2, 6–2
Loss	4–5	Apr 2019	Grand Prix Hassan II, Morocco	250 Series	Clay	(France) Benoît Paire	2–6, 3–6

=== Doubles: 7 (7 runner-ups) ===
Legend Grand Slam tournaments (0–0) ATP World Tour Finals (0–0) ATP World Tour Masters 1000 (0–0) ATP World Tour 500 Series (0–1) ATP World Tour 250 Series (0–6)	Finals by surface Hard (0–1) Clay (0–6) Grass (0–0)	Finals by setting Outdoor (0–7) Indoor (0–0)

Result	W–L	Date	Tournament	Tier	Surface	Partner	Opponents	Score
Loss	0–1	Feb 2011	Brasil Open, Brazil	250 Series	Clay	(Spain) Daniel Gimeno Traver	(Brazil) Marcelo Melo (Brazil) Bruno Soares	6–7^{(4–7)}, 3–6
Loss	0–2	Feb 2012	Chile Open, Chile	250 Series	Clay	(Argentina) Carlos Berlocq	(Portugal) Fred Gil (Spain) Daniel Gimeno Traver	6–1, 5–7, [10–12]
Loss	0–3	Aug 2012	Winston-Salem Open, US	250 Series	Hard	(Argentina) Leonardo Mayer	(Mexico) Santiago González (United States) Scott Lipsky	3–6, 6–4, [2–10]
Loss	0–4	Jul 2013	Swiss Open, Switzerland	250 Series	Clay	(Spain) Guillermo García López	(United Kingdom) Jamie Murray (Australia) John Peers	3–6, 4–6
Loss	0–5	Feb 2015	Rio Open, Brazil	500 Series	Clay	(Austria) Oliver Marach	(Slovakia) Martin Kližan (Austria) Philipp Oswald	6–7^{(3–7)}, 4–6
Loss	0–6	Mar 2015	Argentina Open, Argentina	250 Series	Clay	(Austria) Oliver Marach	(Finland) Jarkko Nieminen (Brazil) André Sá	6–4, 4–6, [7–10]
Loss	0–7	May 2022	Geneva Open, Switzerland	250 Series	Clay	(Netherlands) Matwé Middelkoop	(Croatia) Nikola Mektić (Croatia) Mate Pavić	6–2, 2–6, [3–10]

== ATP Challenger and ITF Futures finals ==
=== Singles: 27 (13–14) ===
Legend ATP Challenger (11–10) ITF Futures (2–4)	Finals by surface Hard (0–0) Clay (13–14) Grass (0–0) Carpet (0–0)

Result	W–L	Date	Tournament	Tier	Surface	Opponent	Score
Loss	0–1	Mar 2005	Italy F4, Caltanissetta	Futures	Clay	(Italy) Stefano Galvani	3–6, 0–6
Win	1–1	Jul 2005	Spain F15, Elche	Futures	Clay	(Spain) Gabriel Trujillo Soler	6–3, 3–6, 6–3
Loss	1–2	Oct 2005	Spain F29, Barcelona	Futures	Clay	(France) Stéphane Robert	5–7, 3–6
Win	2–2	Nov 2005	Spain F31, Vilafranca	Futures	Clay	(Netherlands) Nick van der Meer	2–6, 6–3, 7–5
Loss	2–3	Mar 2006	Italy F6, Catania	Futures	Clay	(Austria) Werner Eschauer	3–6, 3–6
Loss	2–4	Apr 2006	Italy F7, Monterotondo	Futures	Clay	(Italy) Francesco Piccari	5–7, 5–7
Win	3–4	Jul 2006	Rimini, Italy	Challenger	Clay	(Austria) Werner Eschauer	3–6, 6–1, 7–5
Win	4–4	Aug 2006	Vigo, Spain	Challenger	Clay	(Spain) Fernando Vicente	7–5, 7–6^{(8–6)}
Loss	4–5	Aug 2007	Trani, Italy	Challenger	Clay	(Italy) Flavio Cipolla	6–4, 2–6, 4–6
Loss	4–6	Sep 2007	Seville, Spain	Challenger	Clay	(Portugal) Fred Gil	1–6, 3–6
Loss	4–7	May 2008	Telde, Spain	Challenger	Clay	(Russia) Teimuraz Gabashvili	4–6, 6–4, 1–6
Loss	4–8	Jun 2008	Reggio Emilia, Italy	Challenger	Clay	(France) Mathieu Montcourt	6–2, 2–6, 4–6
Win	5–8	Aug 2008	Vigo, Spain	Challenger	Clay	(Italy) Marco Crugnola	6–1, 3–6, 6–3
Win	6–8	Aug 2008	San Sebastián, Spain	Challenger	Clay	(Spain) Rubén Ramírez Hidalgo	6–4, 6–1
Loss	6–9	Aug 2009	Orbetello, Italy	Challenger	Clay	(Ukraine) Alexandr Dolgopolov	4–6, 2–6
Loss	6–10	Apr 2010	Monza, Italy	Challenger	Clay	(Germany) Daniel Brands	7–6^{(7–4)}, 3–6, 4–6
Loss	6–11	Jun 2010	Reggio Emilia, Italy	Challenger	Clay	(Argentina) Carlos Berlocq	0–6, 6–7^{(1–7)}
Win	7–11	Jul 2010	Orbetello, Italy	Challenger	Clay	(France) Édouard Roger-Vasselin	6–4, 6–3
Loss	7–12	Aug 2010	Geneva, Switzerland	Challenger	Clay	(Bulgaria) Grigor Dimitrov	2–6, 6–2, 4–6
Win	8–12	Apr 2018	Alicante, Spain	Challenger	Clay	(Australia) Alex de Minaur	7–6^{(7–5)}, 6–1
Win	9–12	Oct 2018	Florence, Italy	Challenger	Clay	(Argentina) Marco Trungelliti	7–5, 6–3
Win	10–12	Nov 2018	Buenos Aires, Argentina	Challenger	Clay	(Argentina) Pedro Cachin	6–3, 6–1
Win	11–12	Mar 2019	Marbella, Spain	Challenger	Clay	(France) Benoît Paire	4–6, 7–6^{(8–6)}, 6–4
Win	12–12	Apr 2019	Alicante, Spain	Challenger	Clay	(Spain) Pedro Martínez	6–3, 3–6, 6–4
Win	13–12	Jun 2019	Prostějov, Czech Republic	Challenger	Clay	(Hungary) Attila Balázs	6–2, 7–5
Loss	13-13	Sep 2020	Prostejov, Czech Republic	Challenger	Clay	(Poland) Kamil Majchrzak	2-6, 6-7^{(5-7)}
Loss	13-14	Jul 2022	Iași, Romania	Challenger	Clay	(Brazil) Felipe Meligeni Alves	3-6, 6-4, 2-6

=== Doubles: 17 (6–11) ===
Legend ATP Challenger (4–5) ITF Futures (2–6)	Finals by surface Hard (0–0) Clay (6–11) Grass (0–0) Carpet (0–0)

Result	W–L	Date	Tournament	Tier	Surface	Partner	Opponents	Score
Loss	0–1	Mar 2005	Italy F4, Caltanissetta	Futures	Clay	(Italy) Matteo Volante	(Greece) Konstantinos Economidis (Greece) Alexandros Jakupovic	2–6, 6–3, 6–7^{(4–7)}
Win	1–1	May 2005	Spain F5, Lleida	Futures	Clay	(Spain) Marc Fornell Mestres	(El Salvador) Rafael Arévalo (Togo) Komlavi Loglo	6–2, 4–6, 6–3
Loss	1–2	Jun 2005	Romania F7, Bucharest	Futures	Clay	(Venezuela) Igor Muguruza	(Uruguay) Pablo Cuevas (Uruguay) Martín Vilarrubí	7–5, 1–6, 4–6
Loss	1–3	Jul 2005	Spain F14, Alicante	Futures	Clay	(Japan) Jun Kato	(Spain) David Marrero (Spain) Pablo Santos González	6–3, 5–7, 2–6
Win	2–3	Jul 2005	Spain F15, Elche	Futures	Clay	(Japan) Jun Kato	(Spain) Daniel Muñoz de la Nava (Spain) Pablo Santos González	7–5, 4–1 ret.
Loss	2–4	Nov 2005	Spain F33, Gran Canaria	Futures	Clay	(Czech Republic) Dušan Karol	(Spain) David de Miguel-Lapiedra (Portugal) Rui Machado	6–4, 4–6, 4–6
Loss	2–5	Mar 2006	Italy F4, Siracuse	Futures	Clay	(Spain) Francisco Fogués Domenech	(Belgium) Jeroen Masson (Spain) Gabriel Trujillo Soler	6–1, 1–6, 6–7^{(5–7)}
Loss	2–6	Jun 2006	Sassuolo, Italy	Challenger	Clay	(Italy) Leonardo Azzaro	(Italy) Francesco Aldi (Italy) Tomas Tenconi	0–6, 1–6
Win	3–6	Jul 2006	Mantova, Italy	Challenger	Clay	(Spain) Marcel Granollers	(Italy) Alessandro Motti (Spain) Daniel Muñoz de la Nava	6–3, 5–7, [10–7]
Win	4–6	Aug 2006	Vigo, Spain	Challenger	Clay	(Spain) Marcel Granollers	(France) Augustin Gensse (Argentina) Horacio Zeballos	7–6^{(7–4)}, 6–1
Win	5–6	Sep 2006	Seville, Spain	Challenger	Clay	(Spain) Marcel Granollers	(United States) Hugo Armando (Spain) Carlos Poch Gradin	4–6, 6–3, [10–8]
Loss	5–7	Oct 2006	Barcelona, Spain	Challenger	Clay	(Spain) Marcel Granollers	(Germany) Tomas Behrend (Italy) Flavio Cipolla	3–6, 2–6
Loss	5–8	Mar 2007	Italy F4, Siracuse	Futures	Clay	(Italy) Marco Pedrini	(Italy) Alberto Brizzi (Italy) Giancarlo Petrazzuolo	1–4, 2–4
Loss	5–9	Jul 2007	Turin, Italy	Challenger	Clay	(Brazil) Flávio Saretta	(Uruguay) Pablo Cuevas (Argentina) Horacio Zeballos	6–3, 6–1
Loss	5–10	Oct 2007	Tarragona, Spain	Challenger	Clay	(Spain) Daniel Muñoz de la Nava	(Spain) Marcel Granollers (Spain) Santiago Ventura	4–6, 6–7^{(3–7)}
Win	6–10	Feb 2010	Meknes, Morocco	Challenger	Clay	(Italy) Flavio Cipolla	(Ukraine) Alexandr Dolgopolov (Ukraine) Artem Smirnov	6–2, 6–2
Loss	6–11	Oct 2010	Tarragona, Spain	Challenger	Clay	(Spain) Gerard Granollers Pujol	(Spain) Guillermo Olaso (Spain) Pere Riba	6–7^{(2–7)}, 6–4, [5–10]

== Junior Grand Slam finals ==
=== Doubles: 1 (1 title) ===
Result	Year	Tournament	Surface	Partner	Opponents	Score
Win	2004	French Open	Clay	(Spain) Marcel Granollers	(United States) Alex Kuznetsov (Germany) Mischa Zverev	6–3, 6–2

== Record against top 10 players ==
Andújar's match record against players who have been ranked world No. 10 or higher is as follows. Players who have been No. 1 are in boldface.

- (France) Gilles Simon 4–2
- (Spain) Fernando Verdasco 3–3
- (Spain) Tommy Robredo 2–2
- (Switzerland) **Roger Federer** 1–0
- (Australia) **Lleyton Hewitt** 1–0
- (Russia) Karen Khachanov 1–0
- (Argentina) Juan Mónaco 1–0
- (Austria) Jürgen Melzer 1–1
- (Serbia) Janko Tipsarević 1–1
- (Croatia) Marin Čilić 1–2
- (Spain) **Juan Carlos Ferrero** 1–2
- (United States) John Isner 1–2
- (United States) Jack Sock 1–2
- (Russia) Mikhail Youzhny 1–2
- (Czechoslovakia) Tomáš Berdych 1–3
- (Bulgaria) Grigor Dimitrov 1–3
- (Spain) David Ferrer 1–3
- (Belgium) David Goffin 1–3
- (Austria) Dominic Thiem 1–3
- (Japan) Kei Nishikori 1–4
- (Italy) Fabio Fognini 1–5
- (Cyprus) Marcos Baghdatis 0–1
- (Italy) Matteo Berrettini 0–1
- (United States) James Blake 0–1
- (Argentina) Guillermo Canas 0–1
- (Spain) Pablo Carreño Busta 0–1
- (Russia) Nikolay Davydenko 0–1
- (France) Richard Gasquet 0–1
- (Chile) Fernando González 0–1
- (Germany) Tommy Haas 0–1
- (United Kingdom) **Andy Murray** 0–1
- (United Kingdom) Cameron Norrie 0–1
- (Russia) Andrey Rublev 0–1
- (Czechoslovakia) Radek Štěpánek 0–1
- (Greece) Stefanos Tsitsipas 0–1
- (South Africa) Kevin Anderson 0–2
- (Russia) **Daniil Medvedev** 0–2
- (Spain) **Carlos Moya** 0–2
- (Canada) Milos Raonic 0–2
- (Norway) Casper Ruud 0–2
- (Argentina) Diego Schwartzman 0–2
- (Canada) Denis Shapovalov 0–2
- (Spain) Roberto Bautista Agut 0–3
- (Serbia) **Novak Djokovic** 0–3
- (France) Jo-Wilfried Tsonga 0–3
- (Switzerland) Stanislas Wawrinka 0–3
- (Spain) Nicolás Almagro 0–4
- (France) Gaël Monfils 0–4
- (Spain) **Rafael Nadal** 0–4

* As of 29 September 2022.

== Top 10 wins ==
- He has a 6–24 record against players who were, at the time the match was played, ranked in the top 10.

Season	2011	2012	2013	2014	2015	...	2021	Total
Wins	1	1	0	1	1		2	6

#	Player	Rank	Event	Surface	Rd	Score	PAR
2011
1.	(Spain) Fernando Verdasco	9	Miami Open, United States	Hard	2R	3–6, 7–6^{(7–3)}, 6–4	69
2012
2.	(Serbia) Janko Tipsarević	8	Cincinnati Masters, United States	Hard	2R	6–4, 4–1, ret.	40
2014
3.	(Czech Republic) Tomáš Berdych	6	Valencia Open, Spain	Hard (i)	1R	6–3, 6–2	46
2015
4.	(Spain) David Ferrer	8	Barcelona Open, Spain	Clay	SF	7–6^{(8–6)}, 6–3	66
2021
5.	(Switzerland) Roger Federer	8	Geneva Open, Switzerland	Clay	2R	6–4, 4–6, 6–4	75
6.	(Austria) Dominic Thiem	4	French Open, France	Clay	1R	4–6, 5–7, 6–3, 6–4, 6–4	68

== Personal life ==
Andújar lives in the Valencian Community since he was three years old, and his father is from Sueca, Valencia.

He married Cristina Moreta Icart in November 2016. The couple have four children.
