= Tomas Tenconi =

Italian tennis player

- Country (sports): Italy
- Residence: Buenos Aires, Argentina
- Born: 3 September 1980 (age 46) Buenos Aires, Argentina
- Height: 1.78 m (5 ft 10 in)
- Turned pro: 2000
- Retired: 2011
- Plays: Right-handed
- Prize money: $217,290

Singles
- Career record: 1–2
- Career titles: 0
- Highest ranking: No. 141 (6 June 2005)

Grand Slam singles results
- French Open: 1R (2005)
- Wimbledon: Q1 (2009)

Doubles
- Career record: 0-1
- Career titles: 0
- Highest ranking: 145 (15 August 2005)
- Last updated on: 3 July 2017.

Tomas Tenconi (born 3 September 1980) is a former professional Italian tennis player.

== ATP tournaments finals ==
Legend
ATP Challenger Series (3)

=== Titles (3) ===
No.	Date	Tournament	Surface	Opponent	Score
1.	12 July 2004	Rimini, Italy	Clay	(Spain) Álex Calatrava	6–2, 6–1
2.	15 September 2008	Todi, Italy	Clay	(Spain) Rubén Ramírez Hidalgo	4–6, 6–3, 6–0
3.	22 September 2008	Napoli, Italy	Clay	(Algeria) Lamine Ouahab	6–7^{(6–8)}, 6–3, 6–1
