= Alessio di Mauro =

Italian tennis player

- Country (sports): Italy
- Born: 9 August 1977 (age 49) Syracuse, Italy
- Height: 1.85 m (6 ft 1 in)
- Turned pro: 1998
- Retired: 2014
- Plays: Left-handed (two-handed backhand)
- Prize money: US$ 833,633

Singles
- Career record: 17–36
- Career titles: 0
- Highest ranking: No. 68 (26 February 2007)

Grand Slam singles results
- Australian Open: 1R (2007)
- French Open: 1R (2006, 2007)
- Wimbledon: 2R (2005)
- US Open: 2R (2006)

Doubles
- Career record: 1–14
- Career titles: 0
- Highest ranking: No. 136 (30 January 2012)

Grand Slam doubles results
- Wimbledon: 2R (2006)
- Last updated on: 14 February 2023.

Alessio di Mauro (born 9 August 1977) is a former professional tennis player from Italy. During his career, he reached the final of one ATP tournament, the 2007 ATP Buenos Aires. On 26 February 2007 the left-hander reached his career high ranking of world no. 68.

== Betting scandal ==
On 10 November 2007, at a position of world no. 124, di Mauro was the first player to be sanctioned after being embroiled in a betting scandal. Di Mauro received a $60,000 (£29,000) fine and 9 months banning from the ATP Tour for an offense that carried a maximum punishment of three years. Some officials called for a harsher punishment. However, di Mauro was not betting on the outcome of his own matches nor did he attempt to influence the outcomes of matches. He was found to be betting from 2 November 2006 to 12 June 12, 2007, and was caught as a result of an investigation beginning in April 2007.

== ATP career finals ==
=== Singles: 1 (1 runner-up) ===
Legend Grand Slam Tournaments (0–0) ATP World Tour Finals (0–0) ATP Masters 1000 Series (0–0) ATP 500 Series (0–0) ATP 250 Series (0–1)	Finals by surface Hard (0–0) Clay (0–1) Grass (0–0) Carpet (0–0)	Finals by setting Outdoors (0–1) Indoors (0–0)

Result	W–L	Date	Tournament	Tier	Surface	Opponent	Score
Loss	0–1	Feb 2007	Buenos Aires, Argentina	International Series	Clay	(Argentina) Juan Mónaco	1–6, 2–6

== ATP Challenger and ITF Futures finals ==
=== Singles: 28 (13–15) ===
Legend ATP Challenger (7–9) ITF Futures (6–6)	Finals by surface Hard (0–0) Clay (13–15) Grass (0–0) Carpet (0–0)

Result	W–L	Date	Tournament	Tier	Surface	Opponent	Score
Loss	0–1	Jun 1998	Macedonia F2, Kočani	Futures	Clay	(Bulgaria) Mark Markov	5–7, 6–4, 1–6
Loss	0–2	Jul 2000	Italy F8, Jesi	Futures	Clay	(Italy) Elia Grossi	4–1, 1–4, 1–4, 5–3, 0–4
Loss	0–3	Aug 2000	Italy F10, Trani	Futures	Clay	(Austria) Oliver Marach	2–4, 1–4, 2–4
Win	1–3	Jul 2001	Campinas, Brazil	Challenger	Clay	(Paraguay) Ramón Delgado	6–2, 6–4
Win	2–3	Aug 2001	Italy F10, Jesi	Futures	Clay	(Italy) Davide Scala	6–1, 6–0
Loss	2–4	Aug 2001	Bressanone, Italy	Challenger	Clay	(Italy) Renzo Furlan	1–6, 3–6
Win	3–4	Aug 2003	San Marino, San Marino	Challenger	Clay	(Spain) David Sánchez	6–3, 3–2 ret.
Loss	3–5	Jun 2004	Sassuolo, Italy	Challenger	Clay	(Italy) Potito Starace	2–6, 3–6
Win	4–5	Jul 2004	Mantova, Italy	Challenger	Clay	(Italy) Tomas Tenconi	7–6^{(7–4)}, 6–2
Loss	4–6	Sep 2004	Budapest, Hungary	Challenger	Clay	(France) Stéphane Robert	1–6, 6–4, 5–7
Loss	4–7	Mar 2005	Barletta, Italy	Challenger	Clay	(France) Richard Gasquet	3–6, 6–7^{(6–8)}
Loss	4–8	Apr 2005	Olbia, Italy	Challenger	Clay	(Germany) Tomas Behrend	1–6, 6–4, 5–7
Win	5–8	Apr 2005	Monza, Italy	Challenger	Clay	(France) Nicolas Devilder	6–1, 2–6, 6–3
Loss	5–9	May 2005	Turin, Italy	Challenger	Clay	(Argentina) Carlos Berlocq	5–7, 1–6
Loss	5–10	Apr 2006	Napoli, Italy	Challenger	Clay	(Italy) Potito Starace	0–6, 1–5 ret.
Win	6–10	Jul 2007	Mantova, Italy	Challenger	Clay	(France) Thierry Ascione	7–5, 7–6^{(8–6)},
Win	7–10	Jun 2009	Milan, Italy	Challenger	Clay	(France) Vincent Millot	6–4, 7–6^{(7–3)},
Loss	7–11	Mar 2010	Spain F8, Sabadell	Futures	Clay	(Spain) Gabriel Trujillo Soler	2–6, 2–6
Win	8–11	Mar 2010	Italy F3, Foggia	Futures	Clay	(Austria) Andreas Haider-Maurer	6–2, 7–6^{(7–2)},
Win	9–11	May 2010	Italy F8, Pozzuoli	Futures	Clay	(Italy) Simone Vagnozzi	7–5, 6–4
Win	10–11	Oct 2010	Italy F30, Reggio Calabria	Futures	Clay	(Italy) Luca Vanni	7–6^{(7–4)}, 6–4
Loss	10–12	Feb 2011	Casablance, Morocco	Challenger	Clay	(Russia) Evgeny Donskoy	6–2, 3–6, 3–6
Loss	10–13	Apr 2011	Monza, Italy	Challenger	Clay	(Germany) Julian Reister	6–2, 3–6, 3–6
Loss	10–14	Feb 2013	Spain F1, Mallorca	Futures	Clay	(Spain) Pablo Carreño Busta	1–6, 1–6
Win	11–14	Mar 2013	San Luis Potosí, Mexico	Challenger	Clay	(United States) Daniel Kosakowski	4–6, 6–3, 6–2
Win	12–14	Oct 2013	Italy F29, Palermo	Futures	Clay	(Italy) Gianluca Naso	6–4, 6–3
Win	13–14	Oct 2013	Italy F30, Palermo	Futures	Clay	(Italy) Simone Vagnozzi	6–3, 6–3
Loss	13–15	May 2014	Italy F12, Santa Margherita Di Pula	Futures	Clay	(Italy) Luca Vanni	1–6, 1–3 ret.

=== Doubles: 22 (9–13) ===
Legend ATP Challenger (7–12) ITF Futures (2–1)	Finals by surface Hard (0–0) Clay (9–13) Grass (0–0) Carpet (0–0)

Result	W–L	Date	Tournament	Tier	Surface	Partner	Opponents	Score
Loss	0–1	Jun 2003	Reggio Emilia, Italy	Challenger	Clay	(Italy) Vincenzo Santopadre	(Australia) Joseph Sirianni (Netherlands) Rogier Wassen	4–6, 4–6
Win	1–1	Jul 2003	Olbia, Italy	Challenger	Clay	(Italy) Vincenzo Santopadre	(France) Julien Jeanpierre (Luxembourg) Mike Scheidweiler	2–6, 6–4, 6–2
Loss	1–2	Apr 2005	Olbia, Italy	Challenger	Clay	(Italy) Tomas Tenconi	(Italy) Massimo Bertolini (Italy) Uros Vico	4–6, 4–6
Loss	1–3	May 2005	Turin, Italy	Challenger	Clay	(Italy) Francesco Aldi	(Brazil) Franco Ferreiro (Argentina) Sergio Roitman	7–6^{(7–4)}, 5–7, 6–7^{(2–7)}
Loss	1–4	Apr 2007	Napoli, Italy	Challenger	Clay	(Italy) Marco Crugnola	(Italy) Flavio Cipolla (Spain) Marcel Granollers	4–6, 2–6
Win	2–4	Aug 2008	Cordenons, Italy	Challenger	Clay	(Italy) Marco Crugnola	(Czech Republic) David Škoch (Slovakia) Igor Zelenay	1–6, 6–4, [10–6]
Loss	2–5	Aug 2008	Manerbio, Italy	Challenger	Clay	(Italy) Massimo Dell'Acqua	(Italy) Thomas Fabbiano (Serbia) Boris Pashanski	6–7^{(7–9)}, 5–7
Loss	2–6	Mar 2009	Meknes, Morocco	Challenger	Clay	(Italy) Giancarlo Petrazzuolo	(Spain) Marc López (Algeria) Lamine Ouahab	3–6, 5–7
Loss	2–7	Aug 2009	Orbetello, Italy	Challenger	Clay	(Italy) Manuel Jorquera	(Italy) Paolo Lorenzi (Italy) Giancarlo Petrazzuolo	6–7^{(5–7)}, 6–3, [6–10]
Win	3–7	Aug 2009	Manerbio, Italy	Challenger	Clay	(Italy) Simone Vagnozzi	(Switzerland) Yves Allegro (Netherlands) Jesse Huta Galung	6–4, 3–6, [10–4]
Win	4–7	Apr 2010	Italy F3, Foggia	Futures	Clay	(Italy) Simone Vagnozzi	(Argentina) Diego Álvarez (Argentina) Agustin Picco	6–4, 6–0
Win	5–7	Jul 2010	Orbetello, Italy	Challenger	Clay	(Italy) Alessandro Motti	(Croatia) Nikola Mektić (Croatia) Ivan Zovko	6–2, 3–6, [10–3]
Win	6–7	Sep 2010	Todi, Italy	Challenger	Clay	(Italy) Flavio Cipolla	(Spain) Marcel Granollers (Spain) Gerard Granollers Pujol	6–1, 6–4
Loss	6–8	Feb 2011	Meknes, Morocco	Challenger	Clay	(Italy) Alessandro Motti	(Philippines) Treat Huey (Italy) Simone Vagnozzi	1–6, 2–6
Win	7–8	Mar 2011	Rabat, Morocco	Challenger	Clay	(Italy) Simone Vagnozzi	(Kazakhstan) Evgeny Korolev (Kazakhstan) Yuri Schukin	6–4, 6–4
Win	8–8	Jul 2011	San Benedetto, Italy	Challenger	Clay	(Italy) Alessandro Motti	(Italy) Daniele Giorgini (Italy) Stefano Travaglia	7–6^{(7–5)}, 4–6, [10–7]
Loss	8–9	Aug 2011	Manerbio, Italy	Challenger	Clay	(Italy) Alessandro Motti	(Germany) Dustin Brown (Croatia) Lovro Zovko	6–7^{(4–7)}, 5–7
Loss	8–10	Nov 2011	Medellín, Colombia	Challenger	Clay	(Italy) Matteo Viola	(Chile) Paul Capdeville (Chile) Nicolás Massú	2–6, 6–4, [8–10]
Loss	8–11	May 2012	Italy F9, Pozzuoli	Futures	Clay	(Italy) Stefano Napolitano	(Italy) Claudio Grassi (Italy) Walter Trusendi	3–6, 2–6
Loss	8–12	Jul 2012	Orbetello, Italy	Challenger	Clay	(Italy) Simone Vagnozzi	(Italy) Stefano Ianni (Australia) Dane Propoggia	3–6, 2–6
Loss	8–13	Sep 2012	Todi, Italy	Challenger	Clay	(Italy) Marco Cecchinato	(Austria) Martin Fischer (Austria) Philipp Oswald	3–6, 2–6
Win	9–13	Feb 2013	Spain F1, Mallorca	Futures	Clay	(Italy) Simone Vagnozzi	(Spain) Miguel Ángel López Jaén (Spain) Jordi Marse-Vidri	6–0, 6–3
