= Manuel Jorquera =

Italian tennis player

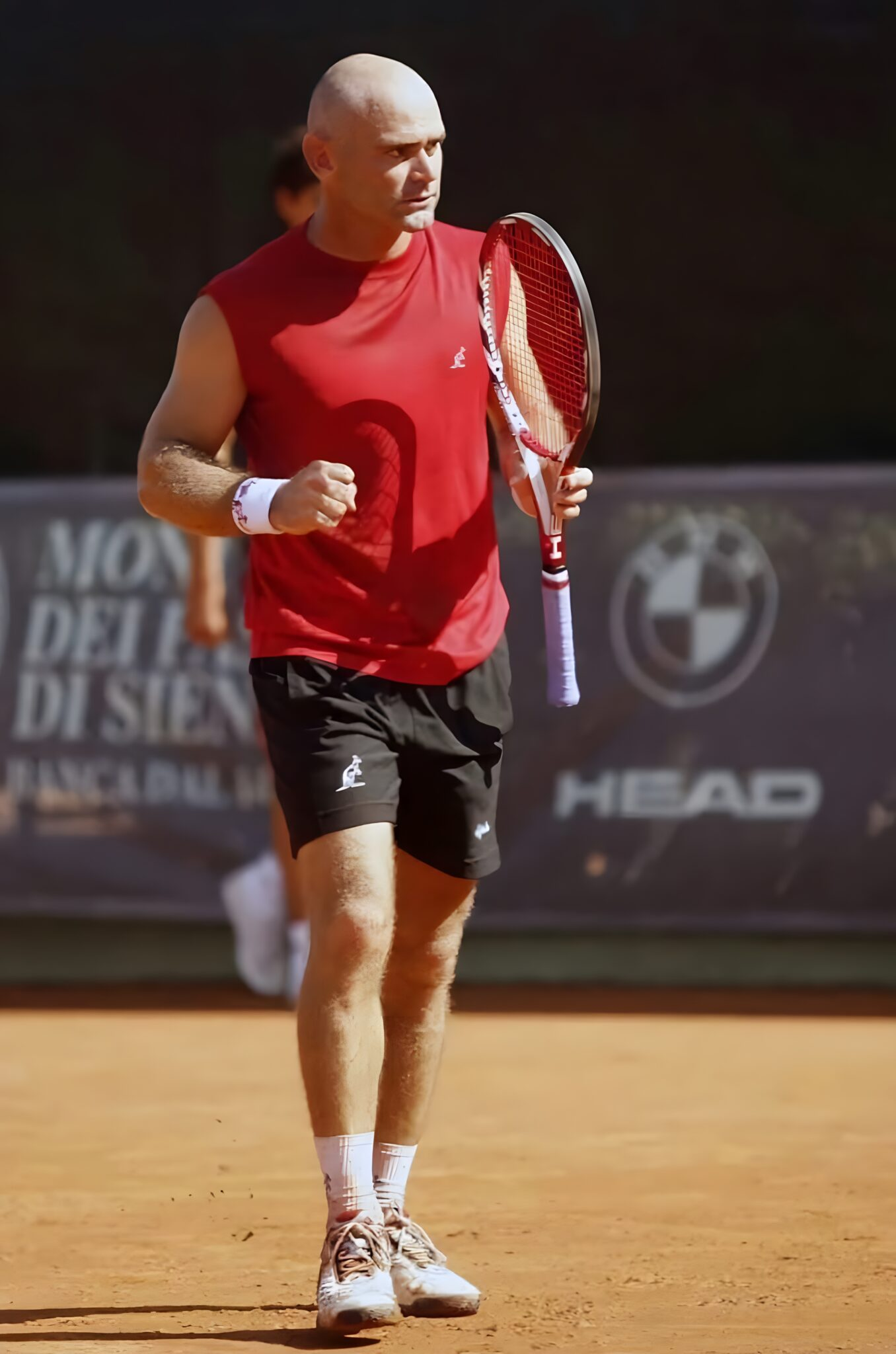
- Full name: Manuel Jorquera
- Country (sports): Italy
- Born: 12 June 1978 (age 48) Bahía Blanca, Argentina
- Plays: Right-handed
- Prize money: $92,176
- Official website: https://manolojorquera.com/

Singles
- Highest ranking: No. 305 (26 November 2007)

Doubles
- Career record: 0–1
- Career titles: 0
- Highest ranking: No. 136 (21 June 2004)

Manuel Jorquera (born 12 June 1978) is a former professional tennis player from Italy.

== Biography ==
Jorquera comes from Argentina originally, born and raised in Bahía Blanca until the age of 11, when he moved to Italy.

Throughout his career he battled many injuries as he competed on the Satellite and Challenger circuits.

He is the highest ranked player to ever beat Novak Djokovic in a professional match, which he did at a Satellite tournament in Serbia and Montenegro in 2003, the Serbian's first month on tour.

In doubles he won two Challenger titles and was runner-up in a further 14 tournaments. It was in doubles that he had only main draw appearance on the ATP Tour, at the 2004 Croatia Open Umag, where he partnered with Victor Hănescu.

Since retiring he spent a year as the director of Tennis Club Este, then in 2013 moved to China to coach the country's junior talent.

== Challenger titles ==
=== Doubles: (2) ===
No.	Year	Tournament	Surface	Partner	Opponents	Score
1.	2003	Recanati, Italy	Hard	(Germany) Frank Moser	(France) Rodolphe Cadart (Israel) Dudi Sela	6–4, 7–5
2.	2005	Rome, Italy	Clay	(Russia) Dmitry Tursunov	(Romania) Victor Ioniță (Romania) Răzvan Sabău	1–6, 7–6^{(7–4)}, 6–4
