= Giancarlo Petrazzuolo =

Italian tennis player

- Country (sports): Italy
- Born: 7 August 1980 (age 46) Italy
- Turned pro: 2009
- Plays: Right-handed
- Coach: Fabrizio Zeppieri
- Prize money: US$139,004

Singles
- Career record: 0–0
- Career titles: 0; 0 Challenger, 5 Futures
- Highest ranking: No. 217 (2 March 2009)

Grand Slam singles results
- Australian Open: Q1 (2009)
- French Open: Q2 (2009)
- Wimbledon: Q1 (2009)
- US Open: Q1 (2009)

Doubles
- Career record: 0–0
- Career titles: 0; 2 Challenger, 22 Futures
- Highest ranking: No. 172 (10 August 2009)

Giancarlo Petrazzuolo (born 7 August 1980) is an Italian former professional tennis player.

Petrazzuolo played right handed. He participated in both doubles and singles tournaments.

== Retirement & Achievements ==
His last professional match in 2010, Petrazzuolo's final singles ranking was 1421, his doubles 1068, while his highest singles ranking during his career was 217. The Italian professional tennis player, Paolo Lorenzi, was Petrazzuolo's last doubles partner. The highest doubles ranking during his career was 172. Petrazzuolo was coached by Fabrizio Zeppieri.

Petrazzuolo preferred playing on a clay court, where he competed for most of his matches.
