= 2014 International Tennis Tournament of Cortina – Doubles =

Doubles
- 2014 International Tennis Tournament of Cortina

Final
- Champions: (Spain) Iñigo Cervantes Huegun (Spain) Juan Lizariturry
- Runners-up: (Chinese Taipei) Lee Hsin-han (United States) Vahid Mirzadeh
- Score: 7–5, 3–6, [10–8]

Events
Singles	Doubles
International Tennis Tournament of Cortina	· 2015 →

Iñigo Cervantes Huegun and Juan Lizariturry became the inaugural doubles champions, beating Lee Hsin-han and Vahid Mirzadeh 7–5, 3–6, [10–8]

== Seeds ==
1. (Italy) Riccardo Ghedin / (Italy) Claudio Grassi (semifinals)
2. (Netherlands) Wesley Koolhof / (Italy) Alessandro Motti (semifinals)
3. (Chinese Taipei) Lee Hsin-han / (United States) Vahid Mirzadeh (final)
4. (Italy) Alessandro Giannessi / (Italy) Potito Starace (quarterfinals)

== Draw ==
=== Key ===
- Q = Qualifier
- WC = Wild card
- LL = Lucky loser
- Alt = Alternate
- SE = Special exempt
- PR = Protected ranking
- ITF = ITF entry
- JE = Junior exempt
- w/o = Walkover
- r = Retired
- d = Defaulted
- SR = Special ranking

=== Draw ===
First round
1	(Italy) R Ghedin (Italy) C Grassi	6	6
(Argentina) G Duran (Serbia) B Pašanski	2	3
WC	(Italy) Pietro Rondoni (Italy) Nicolo Turchetti	6	6
(Brazil) R Dutra Silva (Ecuador) G Lapentti	3	3
4	(Italy) A Giannessi (Italy) P Starace	6	6
(Georgia (country)) N Basilashvili (Bosnia and Herzegovina) A Šetkić	4	3
PR	(Spain) I Cervantes (Spain) J Lizariturry	w/o
(Austria) M Neuchrist (France) M Teixeira
(Brazil) G Clezar (Brazil) L Kirche	3	1
WC	(Italy) P Fanucci (Italy) Omar Giacalone	6	6
(Netherlands) S Fransen (Netherlands) Romano Frantzen	1	2
3	(Chinese Taipei) H-h Lee (United States) V Mirzadeh	6	6
WC	(Italy) W Trusendi (Italy) A Virgili	3	6	[10]
(Italy) M Crugnola (Spain) R Ramírez Hidalgo	6	3	[6]
(Croatia) T Androić (Serbia) N Čačić	0	1
2	(Netherlands) W Koolhof (Italy) A Motti	6	6

Quarterfinals
1	(Italy) R Ghedin (Italy) C Grassi	6	7
WC	(Italy) P Rondoni (Italy) N Turchetti	3	5
4	(Italy) A Giannessi (Italy) P Starace	4	1
PR	(Spain) I Cervantes (Spain) J Lizariturry	6	6
WC	(Italy) P Fanucci (Italy) O Giacalone	3	3
3	(Chinese Taipei) H-h Lee (United States) V Mirzadeh	6	6
WC	(Italy) W Trusendi (Italy) A Virgili	4	2
2	(Netherlands) W Koolhof (Italy) A Motti	6	6

Semifinals
1	(Italy) R Ghedin (Italy) C Grassi	6	4	[2]
PR	(Spain) I Cervantes (Spain) J Lizariturry	3	6	[10]
3	(Chinese Taipei) H-h Lee (United States) V Mirzadeh	6	5	[10]
2	(Netherlands) W Koolhof (Italy) A Motti	4	7	[8]

Final
PR	(Spain) I Cervantes (Spain) J Lizariturry	7	3	[10]
3	(Chinese Taipei) H-h Lee (United States) V Mirzadeh	5	6	[8]
