= 2014 International Tennis Tournament of Cortina =

- Date: 28 July – 3 August
- Edition: 1st
- Surface: Clay
- Location: Cortina d'Ampezzo, Italy

Champions

Singles
- (Serbia) Filip Krajinović

Doubles
- (Spain) Iñigo Cervantes Huegun / (Spain) Juan Lizariturry
International Tennis Tournament of Cortina	· 2015 →

The 2014 International Tennis Tournament of Cortina was a professional tennis tournament played on clay courts. It was the 1st edition of the tournament which was part of the 2014 ATP Challenger Tour. It took place in Cortina d'Ampezzo, Italy, between 28 July and 3 August 2014.

== Singles main-draw entrants ==
=== Seeds ===
Country	Player	Rank^{1}	Seed
ESP	Daniel Gimeno Traver	89	1
ITA	~~Simone Bolelli~~	~~108~~	~~2~~
GER	~~Peter Gojowczyk~~	~~116~~	~~3~~
GER	Andreas Beck	118	4
ITA	Filippo Volandri	119	5
ROU	Victor Hănescu	129	6
SRB	Filip Krajinović	134	7
ROU	Adrian Ungur	159	8

- ^{1} Rankings are as of July 21, 2014.

=== Other entrants ===
The following players received wildcards into the singles main draw:

- (Italy) Simone Bolelli
- (Italy) Federico Gaio
- (Spain) Daniel Gimeno Traver
- (Italy) Stefano Napolitano

The following players received entry from the qualifying draw:

- (Italy) Pietro Fanucci
- (France) Guillaume Rufin
- (Serbia) Viktor Troicki
- (Italy) Adelchi Virgili

The following player received a special exemption into the singles main draw:

- (Ecuador) Giovanni Lapentti

The following player entered using a protected ranking:

- (Spain) Iñigo Cervantes

The following players received entry by a lucky loser spot:

- (Egypt) Karim Hossam
- (Serbia) Boris Pašanski
- (Italy) Walter Trusendi

=== Withdrawals ===
- (Italy) Simone Bolelli
- (Germany) Peter Gojowczyk
- (France) Maxime Teixeira

== Champions ==
=== Singles ===
- (Serbia) Filip Krajinović def. (Italy) Federico Gaio 2–6, 7–6^{(7–5)}, 7–5

=== Doubles ===
- (Spain) Iñigo Cervantes Huegun / (Spain) Juan Lizariturry def. (Chinese Taipei) Lee Hsin-han / (United States) Vahid Mirzadeh 7–5, 3–6, [10–8]
