= 2015 International Tennis Tournament of Cortina – Doubles =

Doubles
- 2015 International Tennis Tournament of Cortina

Final
- Champions: (Italy) Paolo Lorenzi; (Italy) Matteo Viola
- Runners-up: (Chinese Taipei) Lee Hsin-han; (Italy) Alessandro Motti
- Score: 6–7^{(5–7)}, 6–4, [10–3]

Events
Singles	Doubles
← 2014 ·	International Tennis Tournament of Cortina	· 2016 →

Íñigo Cervantes and Juan Lizariturry were the defending champions, but they did not participate this year.

Italians Paolo Lorenzi and Matteo Viola won the tournament, defeating Lee Hsin-han and Alessandro Motti in the final.

== Seeds ==
1. (Germany) Frank Moser / (Germany) Alexander Satschko (semifinals)
2. (United States) James Cerretani / (Romania) Costin Pavăl (first round)
3. (Chinese Taipei) Lee Hsin-han / (Italy) Alessandro Motti (final)
4. (Italy) Paolo Lorenzi / (Italy) Matteo Viola (champions)

== Draw ==
=== Key ===
- Q = Qualifier
- WC = Wild card
- LL = Lucky loser
- Alt = Alternate
- SE = Special exempt
- PR = Protected ranking
- ITF = ITF entry
- JE = Junior exempt
- w/o = Walkover
- r = Retired
- d = Defaulted
- SR = Special ranking

First round

Quarterfinals

Semifinals

Final

1
- (Germany) F Moser
- (Germany) A Satschko
7^{7}
7

WC
- (Italy) G Quinzi
- (Italy) A Virgili
6^{4}
5

1
- (Germany) F Moser
- (Germany) A Satschko
6
6

- (Spain) D Muñoz de la Nava
- (Spain) R Ramírez Hidalgo
6
6^{4}
[3]

Alt
- (Brazil) R Matos
- (Brazil) M Zormann
4
2

Alt
- (Brazil) R Matos
- (Brazil) M Zormann
1
7^{7}
[10]

1
- (Germany) F Moser
- (Germany) A Satschko
6^{4}
7^{7}
[10]

4
- (Italy) P Lorenzi
- (Italy) M Viola
6
7^{7}

4
- (Italy) P Lorenzi
- (Italy) M Viola
7^{7}
6^{3}
[12]

WC
- (Italy) Nicolò Turchetti
- (Italy) A Vavassori
4
6^{5}

4
- (Italy) P Lorenzi
- (Italy) M Viola
6
6

- (Brazil) E Dischinger
- (Brazil) A Ghem
1
4

- (Belgium) J Cagnina
- (Netherlands) S Fransen
3
4

- (Belgium) J Cagnina
- (Netherlands) S Fransen
6
6

4
- (Italy) P Lorenzi
- (Italy) M Viola
6^{5}
6
[10]

PR
- (Brazil) F Neis
- (Portugal) P Sousa
6^{4}
5

3
- (Chinese Taipei) H-h Lee
- (Italy) A Motti
7^{7}
4
[3]

(Italy) G Naso
(Italy) Matteo Volante
7^{7}
6

(Italy) G Naso
(Italy) M Volante
6
3
[8]

- (Netherlands) S Arends
- (Uruguay) A Behar
3
2

3
- (Chinese Taipei) H-h Lee
- (Italy) A Motti
4
6
[10]

3
- (Chinese Taipei) H-h Lee
- (Italy) A Motti
6
6

3
- (Chinese Taipei) H-h Lee
- (Italy) A Motti
6
6

- (Italy) F Gaio
- (Italy) A Giannessi
6
6

- (Croatia) I Sabanov
- (Croatia) M Sabanov
2
2

- (Argentina) T Lipovšek Puches
- (Brazil) F Romboli
2
2

- (Italy) F Gaio
- (Italy) A Giannessi
4
6^{4}

- (Croatia) I Sabanov
- (Croatia) M Sabanov
2
7^{7}
[10]

- (Croatia) I Sabanov
- (Croatia) M Sabanov
6
7^{7}

2
- (United States) J Cerretani
- (Romania) C Pavăl
6
6^{2}
[8]
