= 2014 International Tennis Tournament of Cortina – Singles =

Singles
- 2014 International Tennis Tournament of Cortina

Final
- Champion: (Serbia) Filip Krajinović
- Runner-up: (Italy) Federico Gaio
- Score: 2–6, 7–6^{(7–5)}, 7–5

Events
Singles	Doubles
International Tennis Tournament of Cortina	· 2015 →

Filip Krajinović won the inaugural tournament by defeating Federico Gaio 2–6, 7–6^{(7–5)}, 7–5

== Seeds ==
1. (Spain) Daniel Gimeno Traver (quarterfinals)
2. (Italy) Simone Bolelli (withdrew)
3. (Germany) Peter Gojowczyk (withdrew)
4. (Germany) Andreas Beck (first round)
5. (Italy) Filippo Volandri (second round)
6. (Romania) Victor Hănescu (first round)
7. (Serbia) Filip Krajinović (champion)
8. (Romania) Adrian Ungur (first round)

== Draw ==
=== Key ===
- Q = Qualifier
- WC = Wild card
- LL = Lucky loser
- Alt = Alternate
- SE = Special exempt
- PR = Protected ranking
- ITF = ITF entry
- JE = Junior exempt
- w/o = Walkover
- r = Retired
- d = Defaulted
- SR = Special ranking

=== Finals ===
Semifinals
Q	(Serbia) Viktor Troicki	6	5	3
7	(Serbia) Filip Krajinović	2	7	6
(Italy) Roberto Marcora	5	1
WC	(Italy) Federico Gaio	7	6

Final
7	(Serbia) Filip Krajinović	2	7^{7}	7
WC	(Italy) Federico Gaio	6	6^{5}	5

=== Top half ===
First round
1/WC	(Spain) D Gimeno Traver	7	6
(Croatia) B Ćorić	5	1
Q	(Italy) P Fanucci	6^{6}	6	6
(Serbia) P Krstin	7^{8}	3	2
(Venezuela) R Rodríguez	1	5
LL	(Serbia) B Pašanski	6	7
Q	(Serbia) V Troicki	6	6
6	(Romania) V Hănescu	3	4
4	(Germany) A Beck	4	2
(Germany) M Bachinger	6	6
LL	(Egypt) K Hossam	2	1
SE	(Ecuador) G Lapentti	6	6
(Georgia (country)) N Basilashvili	7^{7}	5	7
PR	(Spain) I Cervantes	6^{4}	7	5
Q	(France) G Rufin	5	6^{5}
7	(Serbia) F Krajinović	7	7^{7}

Second round
1/WC	(Spain) D Gimeno Traver	6	6
Q	(Italy) P Fanucci	4	3
LL	(Serbia) B Pašanski	6^{1}	6^{4}
Q	(Serbia) V Troicki	7^{7}	7^{7}
(Germany) M Bachinger	6	1	7
SE	(Ecuador) G Lapentti	1	6	5
(Georgia (country)) N Basilashvili	5	6	3
7	(Serbia) F Krajinović	7	3	6

Quarterfinals
1/WC	(Spain) D Gimeno Traver	4	3
Q	(Serbia) V Troicki	6	6
(Germany) M Bachinger	4	5
7	(Serbia) F Krajinović	6	7

Semifinals
Q	(Serbia) V Troicki	6	5	3
7	(Serbia) F Krajinović	2	7	6

=== Bottom half ===
First round
5	(Italy) F Volandri	2	7^{7}	6
(Brazil) G Clezar	6	6^{5}	3
(Croatia) T Androić	7^{7}	3	0
(Belgium) Y Reuter	6^{2}	6	6
(Italy) R Marcora	6^{3}	6	6
WC	(Italy) S Napolitano	7^{7}	2	3
(Italy) A Giannessi	3	6	3
LL	(Italy) W Trusendi	6	3	6
8	(Romania) A Ungur	3	4
WC	(Italy) F Gaio	6	6
(Brazil) R Dutra Silva	5	6^{5}
(Bosnia and Herzegovina) A Šetkić	7	7^{7}
(Italy) P Starace	6	6
(Spain) R Ramírez Hidalgo	3	4
(Portugal) R Machado	6^{4}	6	1
Q	(Italy) A Virgili	7^{7}	4	6

Second round
5	(Italy) F Volandri	4	6	0
(Belgium) Y Reuter	6	2	6
(Italy) R Marcora	6^{2}	6	6
LL	(Italy) W Trusendi	7^{7}	1	2
WC	(Italy) F Gaio	7	7
(Bosnia and Herzegovina) A Šetkić	5	5
(Italy) P Starace	4	6	6
Q	(Italy) A Virgili	6	4	0

Quarterfinals
(Belgium) Y Reuter	6^{3}	6	4
(Italy) R Marcora	7^{7}	4	6
WC	(Italy) F Gaio	4	6	7
(Italy) P Starace	6	3	5

Semifinals
(Italy) R Marcora	5	1
WC	(Italy) F Gaio	7	6
