= 2015 International Tennis Tournament of Cortina =

- Date: 3–9 August
- Edition: 2nd
- Surface: Clay
- Location: Cortina d'Ampezzo, Italy

Champions

Singles
- (Italy) Paolo Lorenzi

Doubles
- (Italy) Paolo Lorenzi / (Italy) Matteo Viola
| ← 2014 · | International Tennis Tournament of Cortina | · 2016 → |

The 2015 International Tennis Tournament of Cortina was a professional tennis tournament played on clay courts. It was the 2nd edition of the tournament which was part of the 2015 ATP Challenger Tour. It took place in Cortina d'Ampezzo, Italy between 3 and 9 August 2015.

== Singles main-draw entrants ==
=== Seeds ===
| Country | Player | Rank^{1} | Seed |
|---|---|---|---|
| ITA | Paolo Lorenzi | 83 | 1 |
| SRB | Filip Krajinović | 97 | 2 |
| RUS | Andrey Kuznetsov | 108 | 3 |
| ESP | Daniel Muñoz de la Nava | 109 | 4 |
| BRA | André Ghem | 118 | 5 |
| ARG | Máximo González | 144 | 6 |
| ITA | Andrea Arnaboldi | 158 | 7 |
| RUS | Aslan Karatsev | 176 | 8 |

- ^{1} Rankings are as of July 28, 2015.

=== Other entrants ===
The following players received wildcards into the singles main draw:

- (Italy) Francisco Bahamonde
- (Italy) Alessandro Giannessi
- (Italy) Gianluca Mager
- (Italy) Gianluigi Quinzi

The following player received entry with a protected ranking:

- (Spain) Javier Martí
- (Portugal) Pedro Sousa

The following players received entry from the qualifying draw:

- (Brazil) João Menezes
- (Italy) Matteo Trevisan
- (Argentina) Agustín Velotti
- (Italy) Adelchi Virgili

== Champions ==
=== Singles ===
- (Italy) Paolo Lorenzi def. (Argentina) Máximo González 6–3, 7–5

=== Doubles ===
- (Italy) Paolo Lorenzi / (Italy) Matteo Viola def. (Chinese Taipei) Lee Hsin-han / (Italy) Alessandro Motti 6–7^{(5–7)}, 6–4, [10–3]
