= 2011 Tennislife Cup – Doubles =

Doubles
- 2011 Tennislife Cup

Final
- Champions: (Kazakhstan) Yuri Schukin (Croatia) Antonio Veić
- Runners-up: (Chinese Taipei) Hsieh Cheng-peng (Chinese Taipei) Lee Hsin-han
- Score: 6–7^{(5–7)}, 7–5, [10–8]

Events
Singles	Doubles
← 2010 ·	Tennislife Cup	· 2012 →

Daniel Muñoz-de la Nava and Simone Vagnozzi were the defending champions, but Spanish player decided not to participate. Vagnozzi partnered up with Alessio di Mauro, but lost in the semifinals.

Yuri Schukin and Antonio Veić won the title, defeating Hsieh Cheng-peng and Lee Hsin-han 6–7^{(5–7)}, 7–5, [10–8] in the final.

== Seeds ==
1. (France) Olivier Charroin / (France) Stéphane Robert (semifinals)
2. (Italy) Alessio di Mauro / (Italy) Simone Vagnozzi (semifinals)
3. (Italy) Marco Crugnola / (Italy) Alessandro Motti (first round)
4. (Australia) Adam Feeney / (Germany) Gero Kretschmer (first round)

== Draw ==
=== Key ===
- Q = Qualifier
- WC = Wild card
- LL = Lucky loser
- Alt = Alternate
- SE = Special exempt
- PR = Protected ranking
- ITF = ITF entry
- JE = Junior exempt
- w/o = Walkover
- r = Retired
- d = Defaulted
- SR = Special ranking

=== Draw ===
First round
1	(France) O Charroin (France) S Robert	1	6	[10]
(Argentina) D Junqueira (Argentina) L Mayer	6	3	[7]
(Argentina) C Berlocq (Portugal) F Gil	6	6
Alt	(United Kingdom) Miles Bugby (Russia) Anton Zaytsev	2	0
3	(Italy) M Crugnola (Italy) A Motti	6	1	[8]
(Argentina) A Molteni (Argentina) Diego Schwartzman	4	6	[10]
WC	(Italy) R Bellotti (Austria) A Haider-Maurer	6	2	[7]
(Kazakhstan) Y Schukin (Croatia) A Veić	3	6	[10]
(Romania) M Copil (Romania) A Ungur	7	3	[10]
(Italy) A Giannessi (Italy) W Trusendi	5	6	[8]
(Chinese Taipei) C-p Hsieh (Chinese Taipei) H-h Lee	6	5	[10]
4	(Australia) A Feeney (Germany) G Kretschmer	1	7	[7]
WC	(Italy) M Boscatto (Italy) Antonio di Gaetano	1	6	[10]
WC	(Serbia) B Pašanski (Serbia) M Zekić	6	3	[8]
(Spain) P Carreño-Busta (Czech Republic) Michal Konečný	5	6	[2]
2	(Italy) A di Mauro (Italy) S Vagnozzi	7	3	[10]

Quarterfinals
1	(France) O Charroin (France) S Robert	6	6
(Argentina) C Berlocq (Portugal) F Gil	4	3
(Argentina) A Molteni (Argentina) Diego Schwartzman	2	1
(Kazakhstan) Y Schukin (Croatia) A Veić	6	6
(Romania) M Copil (Romania) A Ungur	4	2
(Chinese Taipei) C-p Hsieh (Chinese Taipei) H-h Lee	6	6
WC	(Italy) M Boscatto (Italy) Antonio di Gaetano	6^{3}	2
2	(Italy) A di Mauro (Italy) S Vagnozzi	7^{7}	6

Semifinals
1	(France) O Charroin (France) S Robert	3	3
(Kazakhstan) Y Schukin (Croatia) A Veić	6	6
(Chinese Taipei) C-p Hsieh (Chinese Taipei) H-h Lee	6	7
2	(Italy) A di Mauro (Italy) S Vagnozzi	2	6^{6}

Final
(Kazakhstan) Y Schukin (Croatia) A Veić	6^{5}	7	[10]
(Chinese Taipei) C-p Hsieh (Chinese Taipei) H-h Lee	7^{7}	5	[8]
