= 2016 International Tennis Tournament of Cortina – Doubles =

Doubles
- 2016 International Tennis Tournament of Cortina

Final
- Champion: (United States) James Cerretani (Austria) Philipp Oswald
- Runner-up: (Spain) Roberto Carballés Baena (Chile) Christian Garin
- Score: 6–3, 6–2

Events
Singles	Doubles
← 2015 ·	International Tennis Tournament of Cortina	· 2017 →

Paolo Lorenzi and Matteo Viola were the defending champions but chose not to participate.

James Cerretani and Philipp Oswald won the title after defeating Roberto Carballés Baena and Christian Garin 6–3, 6–2 in the final.

== Seeds ==
1. (Netherlands) Wesley Koolhof / (Netherlands) Matwé Middelkoop (first round)
2. (United States) James Cerretani / (Austria) Philipp Oswald (champions)
3. (Spain) Íñigo Cervantes / (Netherlands) Mark Vervoort (quarterfinals)
4. (Italy) Riccardo Ghedin / (Italy) Alessandro Motti (first round)

== Draw ==
=== Key ===
- Q = Qualifier
- WC = Wild card
- LL = Lucky loser
- Alt = Alternate
- SE = Special exempt
- PR = Protected ranking
- ITF = ITF entry
- JE = Junior exempt
- w/o = Walkover
- r = Retired
- d = Defaulted
- SR = Special ranking

First round
1	(Netherlands) W Koolhof (Netherlands) M Middelkoop	6	6^{5}	[4]
(Chile) N Jarry (Chile) G Lama	3	7^{7}	[10]
(Croatia) I Sabanov (Croatia) M Sabanov	4	6	[4]
Alt	(Austria) L Miedler (Italy) G Quinzi	6	1	[10]
4	(Italy) R Ghedin (Italy) A Motti	2	4
(Spain) R Carballés Baena (Chile) C Garin	6	6
WC	(Italy) Francisco Bahamonde (Italy) A Pellegrino	6	7
WC	(Italy) Edoardo Eremin (Italy) L Sonego	3	5
PR	(Germany) A Satschko (Germany) S Stadler	6	6
WC	(Italy) Marco Bergagnin (Italy) Luca Serena	4	2
(Argentina) G Andreozzi (Peru) S Galdós	3	6	[6]
3	(Spain) Í Cervantes (Netherlands) M Vervoort	6	3	[10]
(Argentina) JP Paz (Brazil) J Souza	6	1	[9]
(Bosnia and Herzegovina) T Brkić (Serbia) L Đere	3	6	[11]
(Egypt) M Safwat (Serbia) Ilija Vučić	3	0
2	(United States) J Cerretani (Austria) P Oswald	6	6

Quarterfinals
(Chile) N Jarry (Chile) G Lama	4	7^{7}	[10]
Alt	(Austria) L Miedler (Italy) G Quinzi	6	6^{4}	[8]
(Spain) R Carballés Baena (Chile) C Garin	6	6
WC	(Italy) F Bahamonde (Italy) A Pellegrino	4	4
PR	(Germany) A Satschko (Germany) S Stadler	6	4	[10]
3	(Spain) Í Cervantes (Netherlands) M Vervoort	0	6	[5]
(Bosnia and Herzegovina) T Brkić (Serbia) L Đere	3	3
2	(United States) J Cerretani (Austria) P Oswald	6	6

Semifinals
(Chile) N Jarry (Chile) G Lama	4	6^{7}
(Spain) R Carballés Baena (Chile) C Garin	6	7^{9}
PR	(Germany) A Satschko (Germany) S Stadler	4	6	[3]
2	(United States) J Cerretani (Austria) P Oswald	6	3	[10]

Final
(Spain) R Carballés Baena (Chile) C Garin	3	2
2	(United States) J Cerretani (Austria) P Oswald	6	6
