= 2009 Tennislife Cup – Doubles =

Doubles
- 2009 Tennislife Cup

Final
- Champions: (Portugal) Frederico Gil (Croatia) Ivan Dodig
- Runners-up: (Brazil) Thiago Alves (Czech Republic) Lukáš Rosol
- Score: 6–1, 6–3

Events
Singles	Doubles
← 2008 ·	Tennislife Cup	· 2010 →

Leonardo Azzaro and Alessandro Motti were the defending champions, but only Motti chose to start this year.
He partnered with Daniele Bracciali, however they lost to Brian and Dann Battistone in the quarterfinals.
Frederico Gil and Ivan Dodig defeated Thiago Alves and Lukáš Rosol 6–1, 6–3 in the final.

== Seeds ==
1. (Italy) Daniele Bracciali / (Italy) Alessandro Motti (quarterfinals)
2. (Australia) Carsten Ball / (United States) Kaes Van't Hof (quarterfinals)
3. (Israel) Amir Hadad / (Israel) Harel Levy (quarterfinals)
4. (Spain) Pablo Andújar / (Australia) Peter Luczak (quarterfinals)

== Draw ==
=== Key ===
- Q = Qualifier
- WC = Wild card
- LL = Lucky loser
- Alt = Alternate
- SE = Special exempt
- PR = Protected ranking
- ITF = ITF entry
- JE = Junior exempt
- w/o = Walkover
- r = Retired
- d = Defaulted
- SR = Special ranking

=== Draw ===
First round
1	(Italy) D Bracciali (Italy) A Motti	6	4	[10]
(France) J Eysseric (France) A Sidorenko	4	6	[5]
WC	(Morocco) R El Amrani (Netherlands) M Middelkoop	4	1
(United States) B Battistone (United States) D Battistone	6	6
3	(Israel) A Hadad (Israel) H Levy	6	6
(Spain) MÁ López Jaén (Spain) A Ramos-Viñolas	0	2
(Italy) F Aldi (Italy) M Crugnola	3	1
(Croatia) I Dodig (Portugal) F Gil	6	6
(Brazil) T Alves (Czech Republic) L Rosol	6	6
(Russia) T Gabashvili (Algeria) L Ouahab	0	3
WC	(Monaco) B Balleret (Italy) M Trevisan	6	0	[9]
4	(Spain) P Andújar (Australia) P Luczak	1	6	[11]
(Poland) T Bednarek (Poland) M Kowalczyk	6	6
(Spain) I Navarro (Spain) P Santos	3	4
WC	(Italy) Enrico Fioravante (Italy) G Petrazzuolo	6^{5}	4
2	(Australia) C Ball (United States) K Van't Hof	7	6

Quarterfinals
1	(Italy) D Bracciali (Italy) A Motti	7	4	[8]
(United States) B Battistone (United States) D Battistone	5	6	[10]
3	(Israel) A Hadad (Israel) H Levy	6	5	[9]
(Croatia) I Dodig (Portugal) F Gil	4	7	[11]
(Brazil) T Alves (Czech Republic) L Rosol	6	6
4	(Spain) P Andújar (Australia) P Luczak	0	3
(Poland) T Bednarek (Poland) M Kowalczyk	7	6^{1}	[10]
2	(Australia) C Ball (United States) K Van't Hof	6^{6}	7	[5]

Semifinals
(United States) B Battistone (United States) D Battistone	3	4
(Croatia) I Dodig (Portugal) F Gil	6	6
(Brazil) T Alves (Czech Republic) L Rosol	3	7	[12]
(Poland) T Bednarek (Poland) M Kowalczyk	6	6^{4}	[10]

Finals
(Croatia) I Dodig (Portugal) F Gil	6	6
(Brazil) T Alves (Czech Republic) L Rosol	1	3
