= 2015 International Tennis Tournament of Cortina – Singles =

Singles
- 2015 International Tennis Tournament of Cortina

Final
- Champion: (Italy) Paolo Lorenzi
- Runner-up: (Argentina) Máximo González
- Score: 6–3, 7–5

Events
Singles	Doubles
← 2014 ·	International Tennis Tournament of Cortina	· 2016 →

Filip Krajinović was the defending champion, but he lost in the quarterfinals to Máximo González.

Paolo Lorenzi won the tournament, defeating González in the final, 6–3, 7–5.

== Seeds ==
1. (Italy) Paolo Lorenzi (champion)
2. (Serbia) Filip Krajinović (quarterfinals)
3. (Russia) Andrey Kuznetsov (quarterfinals)
4. (Spain) Daniel Muñoz de la Nava (semifinals)
5. (Brazil) André Ghem (first round)
6. (Argentina) Máximo González (final)
7. (Italy) Andrea Arnaboldi (semifinals)
8. (Russia) Aslan Karatsev (second round)

== Draw ==
=== Key ===
- Q = Qualifier
- WC = Wild card
- LL = Lucky loser
- Alt = Alternate
- SE = Special exempt
- PR = Protected ranking
- ITF = ITF entry
- JE = Junior exempt
- w/o = Walkover
- r = Retired
- d = Defaulted
- SR = Special ranking

=== Finals ===
Semifinals
1	(Italy) Paolo Lorenzi	6	6
4	(Spain) Daniel Muñoz de la Nava	2	4
7	(Italy) Andrea Arnaboldi	4	6	6^{1}
6	(Argentina) Máximo González	6	3	7^{7}

Final
1	(Italy) Paolo Lorenzi	6	7
6	(Argentina) Máximo González	3	5

=== Top half ===
First round
1	(Italy) P Lorenzi	6	6
(Chile) C Garin	1	2
(Spain) R Ramírez Hidalgo	6	6
(Slovakia) F Horanský	4	4
(Spain) P Riba	2	6^{7}
(Germany) D Brands	6	7^{9}
(Brazil) F Romboli	7^{7}	3	2
8	(Russia) A Karatsev	6^{5}	6	6
4	(Spain) D Muñoz de la Nava	3	6	6
(Italy) M Viola	6	0	0
PR	(Spain) J Martí	3	6	4
(Italy) F Gaio	6	4	6
WC	(Italy) A Giannessi	7^{7}	6
(Italy) R Marcora	6^{2}	4
Q	(Italy) A Virgili	6	6
5	(Brazil) A Ghem	3	3

Second round
1	(Italy) P Lorenzi	6	6
(Spain) R Ramírez Hidalgo	1	3
(Germany) D Brands	6	7
8	(Russia) A Karatsev	2	5
4	(Spain) D Muñoz de la Nava	6	4	7^{7}
(Italy) F Gaio	4	6	6^{4}
WC	(Italy) A Giannessi	6	3	6
Q	(Italy) A Virgili	1	6	4

Quarterfinals
1	(Italy) P Lorenzi	6	7^{7}
(Germany) D Brands	3	6^{4}
4	(Spain) D Muñoz de la Nava	6	6
WC	(Italy) A Giannessi	4	4

Semifinals
1	(Italy) P Lorenzi	6	6
4	(Spain) D Muñoz de la Nava	2	4

=== Bottom half ===
First round
7	(Italy) A Arnaboldi	6	7^{7}
Q	(Argentina) A Velotti	3	6^{3}
(Italy) F Volandri	6	5	3
(Belgium) J Cagnina	4	7	6
(Italy) R Bellotti	6	6
PR	(Portugal) P Sousa	3	3
WC	(Italy) G Mager	4	5
3	(Russia) A Kuznetsov	6	7
6	(Argentina) M González	6	6
(Egypt) M Safwat	4	2
WC	(Italy) Francisco Bahamonde	7	4
Q	(Brazil) J Menezes	5	4
Q	(Italy) M Trevisan	4	6	6
WC	(Italy) G Quinzi	6	3	0
(Italy) G Naso	5	5
2	(Serbia) F Krajinović	7	7

Second round
7	(Italy) A Arnaboldi	6	6
(Belgium) J Cagnina	3	4
(Italy) R Bellotti	5	4
3	(Russia) A Kuznetsov	7	6
6	(Argentina) M González	6	7^{7}
WC	(Italy) F Bahamonde	2	6^{4}
Q	(Italy) M Trevisan	4	1
2	(Serbia) F Krajinović	6	6

Quarterfinals
7	(Italy) A Arnaboldi	6	1	6
3	(Russia) A Kuznetsov	3	6	3
6	(Argentina) M González	6	6
2	(Serbia) F Krajinović	1	4

Semifinals
7	(Italy) A Arnaboldi	4	6	6^{1}
6	(Argentina) M González	6	3	7^{7}
