= 2013 Trofeo Stefano Bellaveglia – Doubles =

Doubles
- 2013 Trofeo Stefano Bellaveglia

Final
- Champions: (Italy) Marco Crugnola (Italy) Simone Vagnozzi
- Runners-up: (Argentina) Guillermo Durán (Argentina) Renzo Olivo
- Score: 7–6^{(7–3)}, 6–7^{(5–7)}, [10–6]

Events
Singles	Doubles
- Trofeo Stefano Bellaveglia

Stefano Ianni and Dane Propoggia were the defending champions but decided not to participate.
Marco Crugnola and Simone Vagnozzi won the title, defeating Guillermo Durán and Renzo Olivo 7–6^{(7–3)}, 6–7^{(5–7)}, [10–6] in the final.

== Seeds ==
1. (United States) Vahid Mirzadeh / (United States) Denis Zivkovic (semifinals)
2. (Argentina) Guillermo Durán / (Argentina) Renzo Olivo (final)
3. (Italy) Alessandro Motti / (Italy) Matteo Volante (first round)
4. (Italy) Alessio di Mauro / (Italy) Alessandro Giannessi (quarterfinals)

== Draw ==
Key

- Q = Qualifier
- WC = Wild card
- LL = Lucky loser
- Alt = Alternate
- ITF = ITF entry
- PR = Protected ranking
- SR = Special ranking
- SE = Special exempt
- JE = Junior exempt
- JR = Junior Accelerator Programme entrant
- CO = College Accelerator Programme entrant
- NG = Next Gen Accelerator Program entrant
- w/o = Walkover
- r = Retired
- d = Defaulted

=== Draw ===
First round
(Italy) Nicola Barraco (Italy) A Virgili	6	2	[7]
(Greece) T Angelopoulos (Switzerland) L Margaroli	3	6	[10]
3	(Italy) A Motti (Italy) Matteo Volante	5	4
(Italy) M Crugnola (Italy) S Vagnozzi	7	6
(Italy) T Fabbiano (Italy) Matteo Fago	6	6
(Italy) A Brizzi (Italy) D Giorgini	3	1
(Belgium) N Desein (Netherlands) S Groen	6	6
(Italy) Antonio Campo (Italy) M Cecchinato	1	4
(Czech Republic) D Lojda (Czech Republic) J Mertl	2	3
4	(Italy) A di Mauro (Italy) A Giannessi	6	6
(Austria) S Bader (United States) Erik Elliott	6	6
(Czech Republic) Libor Salaba (Italy) Nicolò Turchetti	4	2
(Slovakia) N Gombos (Slovakia) A Martin	3	6^{4}
2	(Argentina) G Durán (Argentina) R Olivo	6	7^{7}

Quarterfinals
1	(United States) V Mirzadeh (United States) D Zivkovic	6	6
(Greece) T Angelopoulos (Switzerland) L Margaroli	0	3
(Italy) M Crugnola (Italy) S Vagnozzi	6	7^{7}
(Italy) T Fabbiano (Italy) M Fago	3	6^{5}
(Belgium) N Desein (Netherlands) S Groen	w/o
4	(Italy) A di Mauro (Italy) A Giannessi
(Austria) S Bader (United States) E Elliott	1	4
2	(Argentina) G Durán (Argentina) R Olivo	6	6

Semifinals
1	(United States) V Mirzadeh (United States) D Zivkovic	3	3
(Italy) M Crugnola (Italy) S Vagnozzi	6	6
(Belgium) N Desein (Netherlands) S Groen	6^{3}	4
2	(Argentina) G Durán (Argentina) R Olivo	7^{7}	6

Final
(Italy) M Crugnola (Italy) S Vagnozzi	7^{7}	6^{5}	[10]
2	(Argentina) G Durán (Argentina) R Olivo	6^{3}	7^{7}	[6]
