= 2013 Prague Open by Advantage Cars =

- Date: 10–16 June
- Edition: 20th
- Draw: 32S / 16D
- Prize money: €42,500
- Surface: Clay
- Location: Prague, Czech Republic
- Venue: I. Czech Lawn Tennis Club

Champions

Singles
- (Ukraine) Oleksandr Nedovyesov

Doubles
- (Chinese Taipei) Lee Hsin-han / (Chinese Taipei) Peng Hsien-yin
- Prague Open by Advantage Cars

The 2013 Prague Open by Advantage Cars was a professional tennis tournament played on clay courts. It was the 20th edition of the tournament which was part of the 2013 ATP Challenger Tour. It took place in Prague, Czech Republic between 10 and 16 June 2013.

== Singles main draw entrants ==
=== Seeds ===
Country	Player	Rank^{1}	Seed
AUT	Andreas Haider-Maurer	105	1
ITA	Filippo Volandri	111	2
USA	Wayne Odesnik	113	3
ESP	Rubén Ramírez Hidalgo	123	4
ITA	Matteo Viola	132	5
ESP	Daniel Muñoz de la Nava	145	6
UKR	Oleksandr Nedovyesov	160	7
ARG	Facundo Argüello	170	8

- ^{1} Rankings are as of May 27, 2013.

=== Other entrants ===
The following players received wildcards into the singles main draw:

- (Czech Republic) Dušan Lojda
- (Czech Republic) Ivo Minář
- (Slovakia) Adrian Sikora
- (Czech Republic) Robin Staněk

The following players received entry a special exempt into the singles main draw:

- (Spain) Pere Riba

The following players received entry from the qualifying draw:

- (Dominican Republic) Víctor Estrella
- (Czech Republic) Lukáš Maršoun
- (Czech Republic) Jan Šátral
- (Czech Republic) Dominik Süč

== Doubles main draw entrants ==
=== Seeds ===
Country	Player	Country	Player	Rank^{1}	Seed
POL	Mateusz Kowalczyk	SWE	Andreas Siljeström	228	1
TPE	Lee Hsin-han	TPE	Peng Hsien-yin	246	2
AUS	Colin Ebelthite	AUS	Rameez Junaid	253	3
CRO	Mate Pavić	CRO	Franko Škugor	300	4

- ^{1} Rankings are as of May 27, 2013.

=== Other entrants ===
The following pair received a wildcard into the doubles main draw:

- (Czech Republic) Jakub Filipský / (Czech Republic) Kryštof Jánošík

The following pair received entry using a protected ranking:

- (Dominican Republic) Víctor Estrella / (Brazil) Leonardo Kirche

The following pair received entry as an alternate into the doubles main draw:

- (Czech Republic) Dušan Lojda / (Netherlands) Boy Westerhof

== Champions ==
=== Singles ===
- (Ukraine) Oleksandr Nedovyesov def. (Spain) Javier Martí, 6–0, 6–1

=== Doubles ===
- (Chinese Taipei) Lee Hsin-han / (Chinese Taipei) Peng Hsien-yin def. (United States) Vahid Mirzadeh / (United States) Denis Zivkovic, 6–4, 4–6, [10–5]
