= 2016 International Tennis Tournament of Cortina – Singles =

Singles
- 2016 International Tennis Tournament of Cortina

Final
- Champion: (Brazil) João Souza
- Runner-up: (Serbia) Laslo Đere
- Score: 6–4, 7–6^{(7–4)}

Events
| Singles | Doubles |
| ← 2015 · | International Tennis Tournament of Cortina | · 2017 → |

Paolo Lorenzi was the defending champion but chose not to participate.

João Souza won the title after defeating Laslo Đere 6–4, 7–6^{(7–4)} in the final.

== Seeds ==
1. (Argentina) Carlos Berlocq (first round)
2. (Spain) Íñigo Cervantes (first round)
3. (Argentina) Facundo Bagnis (quarterfinals, retired)
4. (Russia) Karen Khachanov (second round)
5. (Spain) Roberto Carballés Baena (semifinals)
6. (Argentina) Renzo Olivo (first round)
7. (Italy) Marco Cecchinato (first round)
8. (Argentina) Guido Andreozzi (semifinals)

== Draw ==
=== Key ===
- Q = Qualifier
- WC = Wild card
- LL = Lucky loser
- Alt = Alternate
- SE = Special exempt
- PR = Protected ranking
- ITF = ITF entry
- JE = Junior exempt
- w/o = Walkover
- r = Retired
- d = Defaulted
- SR = Special ranking

=== Finals ===
Semifinals
(Serbia) Laslo Đere | 7^{7} | 6
5 | (Spain) Roberto Carballés Baena | 6^{3} | 3
8 | (Argentina) Guido Andreozzi | 3 | 4
(Brazil) João Souza | 6 | 6

Final
(Serbia) Laslo Đere | 4 | 6^{4}
(Brazil) João Souza | 6 | 7^{7}

=== Top half ===
First round
1 | (Argentina) C Berlocq | 4 | 2
(Italy) F Volandri | 6 | 6
(Serbia) L Đere | 6 | 3 | 6
(Chile) G Lama | 2 | 6 | 1
(Russia) A Rublev | 7^{7} | 7^{11}
Q | (Croatia) V Galović | 6^{4} | 6^{9}
WC | (Italy) L Sonego | 7 | 6
6 | (Argentina) R Olivo | 5 | 4
3 | (Argentina) F Bagnis | 6 | 7^{7}
(Chile) C Garin | 1 | 6^{2}
WC | (Italy) G Mager | 1 | 2
(Egypt) M Safwat | 6 | 6
Q | (Argentina) A Collarini | 7^{8} | 7^{8}
Q | (Italy) G Quinzi | 6^{6} | 6^{6}
(Germany) D Brands | 3 | 4
5 | (Spain) R Carballés Baena | 6 | 6

Second round
(Italy) F Volandri | 5 | 4
(Serbia) L Đere | 7 | 6
(Russia) A Rublev | 6 | 7
WC | (Italy) L Sonego | 3 | 5
3 | (Argentina) F Bagnis | 6^{6} | 6 | 7^{7}
(Egypt) M Safwat | 7^{8} | 4 | 6^{0}
Q | (Argentina) A Collarini | 3 | 6^{5}
5 | (Spain) R Carballés Baena | 6 | 7^{7}

Quarterfinals
(Serbia) L Đere | 2 | 7 | 7^{8}
(Russia) A Rublev | 6 | 5 | 6^{6}
3 | (Argentina) F Bagnis | 5^{r}
5 | (Spain) R Carballés Baena | 4

Semifinals
(Serbia) L Đere | 7^{7} | 6
5 | (Spain) R Carballés Baena | 6^{3} | 3

=== Bottom half ===
First round
8 | (Argentina) G Andreozzi | 6 | 5 | 6
LL | (Bosnia and Herzegovina) T Brkić | 4 | 7 | 2
SE | (Italy) F Gaio | 6 | 6
(Austria) B Trinker | 4 | 4
(Italy) L Giustino | 6 | 7^{7}
(Argentina) A Velotti | 3 | 6^{4}
(Italy) S Caruso | 6 | 3 | 1
4/WC | (Russia) K Khachanov | 0 | 6 | 6
7 | (Italy) M Cecchinato | 3 | 1
(Russia) A Karatsev | 6 | 6
WC | (Italy) Francisco Bahamonde | 0 | 2
(Italy) M Donati | 6 | 6
(Italy) A Arnaboldi | 4 | 4
Q | (France) C Hemery | 6 | 6
(Brazil) J Souza | 7^{7} | 7^{7}
2 | (Spain) Í Cervantes | 6^{3} | 6^{4}

Second round
8 | (Argentina) G Andreozzi | 6 | 6
SE | (Italy) F Gaio | 2 | 4
(Italy) L Giustino | 6 | 6
4/WC | (Russia) K Khachanov | 3 | 3
(Russia) A Karatsev | 6 | 6^{15} | 4
(Italy) M Donati | 3 | 7^{17} | 6
Q | (France) C Hemery | 2 | 6^{4}
(Brazil) J Souza | 6 | 7^{7}

Quarterfinals
8 | (Argentina) G Andreozzi | 6 | 6
(Italy) L Giustino | 3 | 1
(Italy) M Donati | 6 | 6^{2} | 4
(Brazil) J Souza | 4 | 7^{7} | 6

Semifinals
8 | (Argentina) G Andreozzi | 3 | 4
(Brazil) J Souza | 6 | 6
