= 2010 Tennislife Cup =

- Date: 27 September – 3 October
- Edition: 4th
- Location: Naples, Italy

Champions

Singles
- (Italy) Fabio Fognini

Doubles
- (Spain) Daniel Muñoz-de la Nava / (Italy) Simone Vagnozzi
← 2009 ·	Tennislife Cup	· 2011 →

The 2010 Tennislife Cup was a professional tennis tournament played on outdoor red clay courts. It was the fourth edition of the tournament which was part of the 2010 ATP Challenger Tour. It took place in Naples, Italy between 27 September and 3 October 2010.

== ATP entrants ==
=== Seeds ===
Nationality	Player	Ranking*	Seeding
ITA	Potito Starace	50	1
ITA	Fabio Fognini	68	2
POR	Frederico Gil	84	3
ITA	Filippo Volandri	97	4
ESP	~~Pablo Andújar~~	~~105~~	~~5~~
ESP	Albert Ramos-Viñolas	110	6
ITA	Paolo Lorenzi	111	7
ITA	Simone Bolelli	116	8

- Rankings are as of September 20, 2010.

=== Other entrants ===
The following players received wildcards into the singles main draw:

- (Italy) Alberto Brizzi
- (Italy) Enrico Fioravante
- (Italy) Fabio Fognini
- (Italy) Potito Starace

The following players received entry from the qualifying draw:

- (Italy) Andrea Arnaboldi (as a Lucky Loser)
- (Uzbekistan) Farrukh Dustov
- (Serbia) Boris Pašanski
- (Bosnia and Herzegovina) Aldin Šetkić
- (Italy) Luca Vanni

== Champions ==
=== Singles ===
(Italy) Fabio Fognini def. (Serbia) Boris Pašanski, 6–4, 4–2, RET.

=== Doubles ===
(Spain) Daniel Muñoz-de la Nava / (Italy) Simone Vagnozzi def. (Austria) Andreas Haider-Maurer / (Germany) Bastian Knittel, 1–6, 7–6(5), [10–6]
