= 2013 Trofeo Stefano Bellaveglia =

- Date: 22 – 28 July
- Edition: 5th
- Surface: Clay
- Location: Orbetello, Italy

Champions

Singles
- (Italy) Filippo Volandri

Doubles
- (Italy) Marco Crugnola / (Italy) Simone Vagnozzi
| ← 2012 · | Trofeo Stefano Bellaveglia |

The 2013 Trofeo Stefano Bellaveglia was a professional tennis tournament played on clay courts. It was the fifth edition of the tournament which was part of the 2013 ATP Challenger Tour. It took place in Orbetello, Italy between 22 and 28 July 2013.

== Singles main draw entrants ==
=== Seeds ===
| Country | Player | Rank^{1} | Seed |
|---|---|---|---|
| ITA | Filippo Volandri | 101 | 1 |
| ESP | Pablo Carreño Busta | 123 | 2 |
| SVK | Andrej Martin | 128 | 3 |
| FRA | Florent Serra | 170 | 4 |
| FRA | David Guez | 172 | 5 |
| CZE | Jan Mertl | 180 | 6 |
| ESP | Pere Riba | 201 | 7 |
| ARG | Renzo Olivo | 205 | 8 |

- ^{1} Rankings are as of July 15, 2013.

=== Other entrants ===
The following players received wildcards into the singles main draw:

- (Italy) Enrico Burzi
- (Italy) Daniele Giorgini
- (Italy) Adelchi Virgili
- (Italy) Filippo Volandri

The following players received entry from the qualifying draw:

- (Argentina) Guillermo Durán
- (Morocco) Reda El Amrani
- (Czech Republic) Libor Salaba
- (United States) Denis Zivkovic

== Champions ==
=== Singles ===
- (Italy) Filippo Volandri vs. (Spain) Pere Riba 6–4, 7–6^{(9–7)}

=== Doubles ===
- (Italy) Marco Crugnola / (Italy) Simone Vagnozzi def. (Argentina) Guillermo Durán / (Argentina) Renzo Olivo 7–6^{(7–3)}, 6–7^{(5–7)}, [10–6]
