= 2009 Tennislife Cup – Singles =

Singles
- 2009 Tennislife Cup

Final
- Champion: (Portugal) Frederico Gil
- Runner-up: (Italy) Potito Starace
- Score: 2–6, 6–1, 6–4

Events
Singles	Doubles
← 2008 ·	Tennislife Cup	· 2010 →

Tomas Tenconi didn't defend his 2008 title, because he was eliminated by Alexandre Sidorenko already in the first round.
Frederico Gil won in the final 2–6, 6–1, 6–4, against Potito Starace.

== Seeds ==
1. (Australia) Peter Luczak (quarterfinals)
2. (Spain) Óscar Hernández (semifinals)
3. (Spain) Marcel Granollers (quarterfinals)
4. (Russia) Teymuraz Gabashvili (second round)
5. (Italy) Potito Starace (final)
6. (Portugal) Frederico Gil (champion)
7. (Algeria) Lamine Ouahab (first round)
8. (Brazil) Thiago Alves (first round)

== Draw ==
=== Key ===
- Q = Qualifier
- WC = Wild card
- LL = Lucky loser
- Alt = Alternate
- SE = Special exempt
- PR = Protected ranking
- ITF = ITF entry
- JE = Junior exempt
- w/o = Walkover
- r = Retired
- d = Defaulted
- SR = Special ranking

=== Final eight ===
Semifinals
WC	(Romania) Adrian Ungur	4	6^{5}
6	(Portugal) Frederico Gil	6	7
5	(Italy) Potito Starace	6	6
2	(Spain) Óscar Hernández	2	1

Final
6	(Portugal) Frederico Gil	2	6	6
5	(Italy) Potito Starace	6	1	4

=== Top half ===
First round
1	(Australia) P Luczak	4	6	7
(Germany) D Brands	6	3	6^{1}
(Israel) H Levy	4	4
WC	(Italy) F Volandri	6	6
SE	(Spain) A Ramos-Viñolas	6	7
LL	(Monaco) B Balleret	4	5
WC	(Romania) A Ungur	6	6
8	(Brazil) T Alves	2	2
3	(Spain) M Granollers	7	6
Q	(Morocco) R El Amrani	5	3
(Spain) P Riba	6	6
Q	(Netherlands) M Middelkoop	3	1
(France) A Sidorenko	6	7
(Italy) T Tenconi	1	6^{4}
(Croatia) I Dodig	2	6^{5}
6	(Portugal) F Gil	6	7

Second round
1	(Australia) P Luczak	7	6
WC	(Italy) F Volandri	5	2
SE	(Spain) A Ramos-Viñolas	3	5
WC	(Romania) A Ungur	6	7
3	(Spain) M Granollers	6	6
(Spain) P Riba	4	3
(France) A Sidorenko	3	2
6	(Portugal) F Gil	6	6

Quarterfinals
1	(Australia) P Luczak	7	3	2
WC	(Romania) A Ungur	5	6	6
3	(Spain) M Granollers	1	3
6	(Portugal) F Gil	6	6

Semifinals
WC	(Romania) A Ungur	4	6^{5}
6	(Portugal) F Gil	6	7

=== Bottom half ===
First round
5	(Italy) P Starace	7	6
(Italy) P Lorenzi	6^{3}	1
LL	(Italy) M Crugnola	6	6
(Spain) I Navarro	2	3
SE	(Spain) MÁ López Jaén	4	7	0
Q	(Italy) A Brizzi	6	6^{5}	6
PR	(Spain) P Santos	7	4	6^{5}
4	(Russia) T Gabashvili	6^{5}	6	7
7	(Algeria) L Ouahab	4	4
(Belgium) X Malisse	6	6
Q	(Spain) Sergio Gutiérrez-Ferrol	0	3
(Spain) P Andújar	6	6
(Czech Republic) L Rosol	2	6	4
WC	(Italy) G Petrazzuolo	6	2	6
WC	(Italy) Enrico Fioravante	1	4
2	(Spain) Ó Hernández	6	6

Second round
5	(Italy) P Starace	6	6
LL	(Italy) M Crugnola	4	0
Q	(Italy) A Brizzi	4	4
4	(Russia) T Gabashvili	6	6
(Belgium) X Malisse	0	r
(Spain) P Andújar	3
WC	(Italy) G Petrazzuolo	4	6^{6}
2	(Spain) Ó Hernández	6	7

Quarterfinals
5	(Italy) P Starace	7	6
4	(Russia) T Gabashvili	6^{2}	4
(Spain) P Andújar	3	3
2	(Spain) Ó Hernández	6	6

Semifinals
5	(Italy) P Starace	6	6
2	(Spain) Ó Hernández	2	1
