= 2010 Tennislife Cup – Singles =

Singles
- 2010 Tennislife Cup

Final
- Champion: (Italy) Fabio Fognini
- Runner-up: (Serbia) Boris Pašanski
- Score: 6–4, 4–2, RET.

Events
Singles	Doubles
← 2009 ·	Tennislife Cup	· 2011 →

Frederico Gil was the defending champion but lost in the second round to Andreas Haider-Maurer.
Fabio Fognini won this tournament, after Boris Pašanski´s retirement in the final, when the result was 6–4, 4–2 for the Italian player.

== Seeds ==
1. (Italy) Potito Starace (quarterfinals)
2. (Italy) Fabio Fognini (champion)
3. (Portugal) Frederico Gil (second round)
4. (Italy) Filippo Volandri (first round)
5. (Spain) ~~Pablo Andújar~~ (withdrew due to tiredness)
6. (Spain) Albert Ramos-Viñolas (quarterfinals)
7. (Italy) Paolo Lorenzi (first round, retired)
8. (Italy) Simone Bolelli (quarterfinals)

== Draw ==
=== Key ===
- Q = Qualifier
- WC = Wild card
- LL = Lucky loser
- Alt = Alternate
- SE = Special exempt
- PR = Protected ranking
- ITF = ITF entry
- JE = Junior exempt
- w/o = Walkover
- r = Retired
- d = Defaulted
- SR = Special ranking

=== Finals ===
Semifinals
Q	(Serbia) Boris Pašanski	6	7
(Austria) Andreas Haider-Maurer	3	6^{7}
(Croatia) Antonio Veić	6^{3}	3
2/WC	(Italy) Fabio Fognini	7	6

Final
Q	(Serbia) Boris Pašanski	4	2^{r}
2/WC	(Italy) Fabio Fognini	6	4

=== Top half ===
First round
1/WC	(Italy) P Starace	6	6
(France) G Rufin	2	3
(Spain) D Muñoz-De La Nava	1	2
(Spain) Ó Hernández	6	6
WC	(Italy) E Fioravante	5	2
Q	(Serbia) B Pašanski	7	6
(France) B Paire	6	6
LL	(Italy) A Arnaboldi	2	3
3	(Portugal) F Gil	5	6	6
Q	(Italy) L Vanni	7	4	4
(Austria) A Haider-Maurer	6^{1}	7	6
(Kazakhstan) Y Schukin	7	6^{4}	3
(Italy) M Crugnola	7	7
(Germany) B Knittel	6^{2}	6^{2}
Q	(Uzbekistan) F Dustov	7	5
7	(Italy) P Lorenzi	6^{2}	1	r

Second round
1/WC	(Italy) P Starace	5	6	7
(Spain) Ó Hernández	7	2	6^{5}
Q	(Serbia) B Pašanski	7	7
(France) B Paire	6^{1}	6^{5}
3	(Portugal) F Gil	3	2
(Austria) A Haider-Maurer	6	6
(Italy) M Crugnola	5	6^{3}
Q	(Uzbekistan) F Dustov	7	7

Quarterfinals
1/WC	(Italy) P Starace	4	7	3
Q	(Serbia) B Pašanski	6	6^{4}	6
(Austria) A Haider-Maurer	6	6
Q	(Uzbekistan) F Dustov	3	4

Semifinals
Q	(Serbia) B Pašanski	6	7
(Austria) A Haider-Maurer	3	6^{7}

=== Bottom half ===
First round
6	(Spain) A Ramos-Viñolas	6	7
(Hungary) A Balázs	3	5
(Italy) A di Mauro	4	7	6
(Serbia) F Krajinović	6	6^{2}	2
(Croatia) A Veić	7	1	6
(Romania) V Crivoi	6^{8}	6	4
Q	(Bosnia and Herzegovina) A Šetkić	7	7
4	(Italy) F Volandri	6^{4}	5
8	(Italy) S Bolelli	6	2
(Romania) A Ungur	2	1	r
(Italy) S Vagnozzi	6	6
(Italy) M Viola	2	0
(Netherlands) J Huta Galung	6	4	4
WC	(Italy) A Brizzi	3	6	6
(Italy) F Cipolla	3	5
2/WC	(Italy) F Fognini	6	7

Second round
6	(Spain) A Ramos-Viñolas	6	6
(Italy) A di Mauro	2	3
(Croatia) A Veić	6	6
Q	(Bosnia and Herzegovina) A Šetkić	3	3
8	(Italy) S Bolelli	6	7
(Italy) S Vagnozzi	4	6^{2}
WC	(Italy) A Brizzi	2	6	2
2/WC	(Italy) F Fognini	6	3	6

Quarterfinals
6	(Spain) A Ramos-Viñolas	7	1	6^{3}
(Croatia) A Veić	6^{9}	6	7
8	(Italy) S Bolelli	1	3
2/WC	(Italy) F Fognini	6	6

Semifinals
(Croatia) A Veić	6^{3}	3
2/WC	(Italy) F Fognini	7	6
