= 2013 Trofeo Stefano Bellaveglia – Singles =

Singles
- 2013 Trofeo Stefano Bellaveglia

Final
- Champion: (Italy) Filippo Volandri
- Runner-up: (Spain) Pere Riba
- Score: 6–4, 7–6^{(9–7)}

Events
Singles	Doubles
← 2012 ·	Trofeo Stefano Bellaveglia

Roberto Bautista-Agut was the defending champion but chose to participate at the 2013 Crédit Agricole Suisse Open Gstaad instead.

Filippo Volandri won the title, defeating Pere Riba in the final, 6–4, 7–6^{(9–7)}.

== Seeds ==
1. (Italy) Filippo Volandri (champion)
2. (Spain) Pablo Carreño Busta (semifinals)
3. (Slovakia) Andrej Martin (first round)
4. (France) Florent Serra (quarterfinals)
5. (France) David Guez (first round)
6. (Czech Republic) Jan Mertl (first round)
7. (Spain) Pere Riba (final)
8. (Argentina) Renzo Olivo (quarterfinals)

== Draw ==
=== Key ===
- Q = Qualifier
- WC = Wild card
- LL = Lucky loser
- Alt = Alternate
- SE = Special exempt
- PR = Protected ranking
- ITF = ITF entry
- JE = Junior exempt
- w/o = Walkover
- r = Retired
- d = Defaulted
- SR = Special ranking

=== Finals ===
Semifinals
1/WC	(Italy) Filippo Volandri	4	6	6
(Spain) Roberto Carballés Baena	6	4	1
7	(Spain) Pere Riba	2	6	6
2	(Spain) P Carreño Busta	6	3	4

Final
1/WC	(Italy) Filippo Volandri	6	7^{9}
7	(Spain) Pere Riba	4	6^{7}

=== Top half ===
First round
1/WC	(Italy) F Volandri	6	6
(Italy) T Fabbiano	4	2
(Italy) M Cecchinato	4	5
(Italy) A Arnaboldi	6	7
(Slovakia) N Gombos	6	6
Q	(Argentina) G Durán	3	3
(Austria) D Thiem	3	6^{3}
8	(Argentina) R Olivo	6	7^{7}
4	(France) F Serra	6	6
WC	(Italy) Enrico Burzi	1	4
(Italy) G Naso	6	5	6
Q	(Czech Republic) Libor Salaba	2	7	1
Q	(United States) D Zivkovic	1	3
Q	(Morocco) R El Amrani	6	6
(Spain) R Carballés Baena	6	2	6
5	(France) D Guez	4	6	2

Second round
1/WC	(Italy) F Volandri	6	6
(Italy) A Arnaboldi	3	3
(Slovakia) N Gombos	5	6^{3}
8	(Argentina) R Olivo	7	7^{7}
4	(France) F Serra	6	6
(Italy) G Naso	4	3
Q	(Morocco) R El Amrani	6^{6}	2^{r}
(Spain) R Carballés Baena	7^{8}	2

Quarterfinals
1/WC	(Italy) F Volandri	7^{7}	6
8	(Argentina) R Olivo	6^{4}	3
4	(France) F Serra	1	6	4
(Spain) R Carballés Baena	6	2	6

Semifinals
1/WC	(Italy) F Volandri	4	6	6
(Spain) R Carballés Baena	6	4	1

=== Bottom half ===
First round
7	(Spain) P Riba	4	6	6
(Spain) J Checa-Calvo	6	3	2
(France) N Renavand	4	2
(Italy) A Brizzi	6	6
WC	(Italy) A Virgili	2	4
(Italy) S Vagnozzi	6	6
(Belgium) Y Mertens	6	3	6
3	(Slovakia) A Martin	4	6	4
6	(Czech Republic) J Mertl	6	6^{2}	2
(Italy) A Giannessi	2	7^{7}	6
(Czech Republic) D Lojda	4	6	3
(Greece) T Angelopoulos	6	3	6
(Italy) A di Mauro	6^{6}	6	0^{r}
WC	(Italy) D Giorgini	7^{8}	4	3
(Belgium) N Desein	2	1
2	(Spain) P Carreño Busta	6	6

Second round
7	(Spain) P Riba	6	6
(Italy) A Brizzi	3	4
(Italy) S Vagnozzi	6	7^{8}
(Belgium) Y Mertens	2	6^{6}
(Italy) A Giannessi	6^{7}	6	6
(Greece) T Angelopoulos	7^{9}	4	4
WC	(Italy) D Giorgini	1	3
2	(Spain) P Carreño Busta	6	6

Quarterfinals
7	(Spain) P Riba	6	4	6
(Italy) S Vagnozzi	0	6	3
(Italy) A Giannessi	1	6	4
2	(Spain) P Carreño Busta	6	4	6

Semifinals
7	(Spain) P Riba	2	6	6
2	(Spain) P Carreño Busta	6	3	4
