= 2013 Prague Open by Advantage Cars – Doubles =

Doubles
- 2013 Prague Open by Advantage Cars

Final
- Champions: (Chinese Taipei) Lee Hsin-han (Chinese Taipei) Peng Hsien-yin
- Runners-up: (United States) Vahid Mirzadeh (United States) Denis Zivkovic
- Score: 6–4, 4–6, [10–5]

Details
- Draw: 16
- Seeds: 4

Events
Singles	Doubles
← 2012 ·	Prague Open by Advantage Cars	· 2014 →

The men's doubles of the 2013 Prague Open by Advantage Cars tournament was played on clay in Prague, Czech Republic. Lukáš Rosol and Horacio Zeballos were the defending champions, but both decided not to participate.
Lee Hsin-han and Peng Hsien-yin defeated Vahid Mirzadeh and Denis Zivkovic 6–4, 4–6, [10–5] in the final to win the title.

== Seeds ==
1. (Poland) Mateusz Kowalczyk / (Sweden) Andreas Siljeström (first round)
2. (Chinese Taipei) Lee Hsin-han / (Chinese Taipei) Peng Hsien-yin (champions)
3. (Australia) Colin Ebelthite / (Australia) Rameez Junaid (semifinals)
4. (Croatia) Mate Pavić / (Croatia) Franko Škugor (semifinals)

== Draw ==
=== Key ===
- Q = Qualifier
- WC = Wild card
- LL = Lucky loser
- Alt = Alternate
- SE = Special exempt
- PR = Protected ranking
- ITF = ITF entry
- JE = Junior exempt
- w/o = Walkover
- r = Retired
- d = Defaulted
- SR = Special ranking

=== Draw ===
First round
1	(Poland) M Kowalcyk (Sweden) A Siljeström	7	4	[5]
(United States) V Mirzadeh (United States) D Zivkovic	5	6	[10]
PR	(Dominican Republic) V Estrella (Brazil) L Kirche	1	1
(Kazakhstan) A Golubev (Kazakhstan) E Korolev	6	6
3	(Australia) C Ebelthite (Australia) R Junaid	7	6
(Slovakia) P Červenák (Italy) M Viola	5	4
(Canada) P Polansky (Chinese Taipei) T-h Yang	6	6
Alt	(Czech Republic) D Lojda (Netherlands) B Westerhof	3	4
WC	(Czech Republic) Jakub Filipský (Czech Republic) Kryštof Jánošík	1	3
(Czech Republic) J Mertl (Ukraine) O Nedovyesov	6	6
(Italy) A Arnaboldi (Italy) A di Mauro	2	3
4	(Croatia) M Pavić (Croatia) F Škugor	6	6
(Spain) D Muñoz de la Nava (Spain) R Ramírez Hidalgo	7^{7}	4	[8]
(Slovakia) Adrian Sikora (Czech Republic) Robin Staněk	6^{3}	6	10
(Czech Republic) M Michalička (Czech Republic) J Šátral	1	1
2	(Chinese Taipei) H-h Lee (Chinese Taipei) H-y Peng	6	6

Quarterfinals
(United States) V Mirzadeh (United States) D Zivkovic	6	6
(Kazakhstan) A Golubev (Kazakhstan) E Korolev	2	3
3	(Australia) C Ebelthite (Australia) R Junaid	7	6
(Canada) P Polansky (Chinese Taipei) T-h Yang	5	3
(Czech Republic) J Mertl (Ukraine) O Nedovyesov	2	3
4	(Croatia) M Pavić (Croatia) F Škugor	6	3
(Slovakia) A Sikora (Czech Republic) R Staněk	4	3
2	(Chinese Taipei) H-h Lee (Chinese Taipei) H-y Peng	6	3

Semifinals
(United States) V Mirzadeh (United States) D Zivkovic	3	6	[12]
3	(Australia) C Ebelthite (Australia) R Junaid	6	4	[10]
4	(Croatia) M Pavić (Croatia) F Škugor	2	3
2	(Chinese Taipei) H-h Lee (Chinese Taipei) H-y Peng	6	6

Final
(United States) V Mirzadeh (United States) D Zivkovic	4	6	[5]
2	(Chinese Taipei) H-h Lee (Chinese Taipei) H-y Peng	6	4	[10]
