= 2014 Delray Beach International Tennis Championships – Doubles =

Doubles
- 2014 Delray Beach International Tennis Championships

Final
- Champions: (United States) Bob Bryan (United States) Mike Bryan
- Runners-up: (Czech Republic) František Čermák (Russia) Mikhail Elgin
- Score: 6–2, 6–3

Events
Singles	Doubles
- Delray Beach Open

James Blake and Jack Sock were the defending champions, but Blake did not participate was due to his retirement from professional tennis. Sock played alongside Ryan Harrison, but lost to Bob and Mike Bryan in the semifinals.
The Bryan brothers went on to win the title, defeating František Čermák and Mikhail Elgin in the final, 6–2, 6–3.

== Seeds ==
1. (United States) Bob Bryan / (United States) Mike Bryan (champions)
2. (United States) Eric Butorac / (South Africa) Raven Klaasen (first round)
3. (Mexico) Santiago González / (United States) Scott Lipsky (quarterfinals)
4. (United States) Nicholas Monroe / (Germany) Simon Stadler (first round)

== Draw ==
Key

- Q = Qualifier
- WC = Wild card
- LL = Lucky loser
- Alt = Alternate
- ITF = ITF entry
- PR = Protected ranking
- SR = Special ranking
- SE = Special exempt
- JE = Junior exempt
- JR = Junior Accelerator Programme entrant
- CO = College Accelerator Programme entrant
- NG = Next Gen Accelerator Program entrant
- w/o = Walkover
- r = Retired
- d = Defaulted

=== Draw ===
First round
1	(United States) B Bryan (United States) M Bryan	6	6
WC	(France) A Mannarino (United States) M Russell	1	3
(Russia) A Bogomolov Jr. (Israel) D Sela	1	4
(Germany) B Becker (Spain) F López	6	6
3	(Mexico) S González (United States) S Lipsky	6^{3}	6	[10]
(Australia) C Guccione (Australia) L Hewitt	7^{7}	2	[5]
WC	(United States) R Harrison (United States) J Sock	w/o
(Poland) T Bednarek (Croatia) I Karlović
(Czech Republic) F Čermák (Russia) M Elgin	7	6
(Russia) T Gabashvili (Kazakhstan) M Kukushkin	5	1
(United States) B Klahn (United States) T Smyczek	4	6	[12]
4	(United States) N Monroe (Germany) S Stadler	6	3	[10]
(Australia) S Groth (Belarus) M Mirnyi	6	6
(Australia) M Matosevic (Germany) F Moser	1	4
Alt	(United States) S Bangoura (United States) V Mirzadeh	7	3	[10]
2	(United States) E Butorac (South Africa) R Klaasen	5	6	[5]

Quarterfinals
1	(United States) B Bryan (United States) M Bryan	w/o
(Germany) B Becker (Spain) F López
3	(Mexico) S González (United States) S Lipsky	4	5
WC	(United States) R Harrison (United States) J Sock	6	7
(Czech Republic) F Čermák (Russia) M Elgin	6	6
(United States) B Klahn (United States) T Smyczek	2	2
(Australia) S Groth (Belarus) M Mirnyi	7^{7}	6
Alt	(United States) S Bangoura (United States) V Mirzadeh	6^{5}	4

Semifinals
1	(United States) B Bryan (United States) M Bryan	6	6
WC	(United States) R Harrison (United States) J Sock	2	1
(Czech Republic) F Čermák (Russia) M Elgin	6	3	[10]
(Australia) S Groth (Belarus) M Mirnyi	4	6	[8]

Final
1	(United States) B Bryan (United States) M Bryan	6	6
(Czech Republic) F Čermák (Russia) M Elgin	2	3
