= 2011 Tennislife Cup – Singles =

Singles
- 2011 Tennislife Cup

Final
- Champion: (Argentina) Leonardo Mayer
- Runner-up: (Italy) Alessandro Giannessi
- Score: 6–3, 6–4

Events
Singles	Doubles
← 2010 ·	Tennislife Cup	· 2012 →

Fabio Fognini was the defending champion but decided not to participate.
Leonardo Mayer won the title, defeating Alessandro Giannessi 6–3, 6–4 in the final.

== Seeds ==
1. (Italy) Potito Starace (withdrew)
2. (Argentina) Carlos Berlocq (quarterfinals)
3. (Austria) Andreas Haider-Maurer (second round)
4. (Italy) Filippo Volandri (quarterfinals)
5. (Argentina) Diego Junqueira (first round)
6. (Portugal) Frederico Gil (second round)
7. (France) Stéphane Robert (second round)
8. (France) Benoît Paire (first round)

== Draw ==
=== Key ===
- Q = Qualifier
- WC = Wild card
- LL = Lucky loser
- Alt = Alternate
- SE = Special exempt
- PR = Protected ranking
- ITF = ITF entry
- JE = Junior exempt
- w/o = Walkover
- r = Retired
- d = Defaulted
- SR = Special ranking

=== Finals ===
Semifinals
(Germany) Andreas Beck	2	2
(Argentina) Leonardo Mayer	6	6
(Italy) Alessandro Giannessi	6	6
(Romania) Adrian Ungur	2	4

Final
(Argentina) Leonardo Mayer	6	6
(Italy) Alessandro Giannessi	3	4

=== Top half ===
First round
LL	(Argentina) Diego Schwartzman	6^{3}	3
(Germany) A Beck	7^{7}	6
(Slovakia) P Červenák	0	3
Q	(Italy) W Trusendi	6	6
(Italy) A di Mauro	2	6^{5}
WC	(Italy) G Naso	6	7^{7}
(Kazakhstan) Y Schukin	2	3
6	(Portugal) F Gil	6	6
4	(Italy) F Volandri	5	6	6
(Czech Republic) D Lojda	7	4	2
Q	(Serbia) B Pašanski	3	6	4
(Netherlands) T Schoorel	6	4	0r
Q	(Italy) R Bellotti	6	5	5
(Argentina) L Mayer	1	7	7
(Argentina) A Molteni	1	1
7	(France) S Robert	6	6

Second round
(Germany) A Beck	6	6
Q	(Italy) W Trusendi	4	4
WC	(Italy) G Naso	6	6^{6}	6
6	(Portugal) F Gil	4	7^{8}	2
4	(Italy) F Volandri	6	6
Q	(Serbia) B Pašanski	4	3
(Argentina) L Mayer	6	6
7	(France) S Robert	4	3

Quarterfinals
(Germany) A Beck	7	7^{7}
WC	(Italy) G Naso	5	6^{4}
4	(Italy) F Volandri	4	6	2
(Argentina) L Mayer	6	3	6

Semifinals
(Germany) A Beck	2	2
(Argentina) L Mayer	6	6

=== Bottom half ===
First round
8	(France) B Paire	4	6	6^{5}
WC	(Italy) M Crugnola	6	3	7^{7}
WC	(Italy) E Burzi	2	2
(Italy) A Giannessi	6	6
(Croatia) A Veić	7^{7}	6
SE	(Slovenia) A Bedene	6^{4}	3
WC	(Italy) M Trevisan	4	0
3	(Austria) A Haider-Maurer	6	6
5	(Argentina) D Junqueira	6	4	1
(Spain) P Carreño-Busta	2	6	6
(Italy) Andrea Arnaboldi	5	4
(Romania) A Ungur	7	6
(Italy) S Vagnozzi	7^{7}	4	7^{7}
(Romania) M Copil	6^{5}	6	6^{5}
Q	(Serbia) M Zekić	1	3
2	(Argentina) C Berlocq	6	6

Second round
WC	(Italy) M Crugnola	6	3	1
(Italy) A Giannessi	3	6	6
(Croatia) A Veić	6	4	7^{7}
3	(Austria) A Haider-Maurer	3	6	6^{5}
(Spain) P Carreño-Busta	5	4
(Romania) A Ungur	7	6
(Italy) S Vagnozzi	3	2
2	(Argentina) C Berlocq	6	6

Quarterfinals
(Italy) A Giannessi	6	7
(Croatia) A Veić	4	5
(Romania) A Ungur	3	7^{9}	6
2	(Argentina) C Berlocq	6	6^{7}	2

Semifinals
(Italy) A Giannessi	6	6
(Romania) A Ungur	2	4
