= 2009 Tennislife Cup =

- Date: 28 September – 4 October
- Edition: 3rd
- Location: Naples, Italy

Champions

Singles
- (Portugal) Frederico Gil

Doubles
- (Portugal) Frederico Gil / (Croatia) Ivan Dodig
← 2008 ·	Tennislife Cup	· 2010 →

The 2009 Tennislife Cup was a professional tennis tournament played on outdoor red clay courts. It was the third edition of the tournament which was part of the 2009 ATP Challenger Tour. It took place in Naples, Italy between 28 September and 4 October 2009.

== Singles main draw entrants ==
=== Seeds ===
Country	Player	Rank^{1}	Seed
AUS	Peter Luczak	70	1
ESP	Óscar Hernández	76	2
ESP	Marcel Granollers	79	3
RUS	Teymuraz Gabashvili	80	4
ITA	Potito Starace	91	5
POR	Frederico Gil	102	6
ALG	Lamine Ouahab	114	7
BRA	Thiago Alves	116	8

- Rankings are as of September 21, 2009.

=== Other entrants ===
The following players received wildcards into the singles main draw:

- (Italy) Enrico Fioravante
- (Italy) Giancarlo Petrazzuolo
- (Romania) Adrian Ungur
- (Italy) Filippo Volandri

The following players received wildcards into the singles main draw:

- (Spain) Miguel Ángel López Jaén
- (Spain) Albert Ramos-Viñolas

The following players received entry from the qualifying draw:

- (Italy) Alberto Brizzi
- (Morocco) Reda El Amrani
- (Spain) Sergio Gutiérrez-Ferrol
- (Netherlands) Matwé Middelkoop

The following players received a lucky loser entry:

- (Monaco) Benjamin Balleret
- (Italy) Marco Crugnola

== Champions ==
=== Singles ===
(Portugal) Frederico Gil def. (Italy) Potito Starace, 2–6, 6–1, 6–4

=== Doubles ===
(Portugal) Frederico Gil / (Croatia) Ivan Dodig def. (Brazil) Thiago Alves / (Czech Republic) Lukáš Rosol, 6–1, 6–3
