= 2014 Delray Beach International Tennis Championships =

- Date: February 17–23
- Edition: 22nd
- Category: World Tour 250
- Draw: 32S / 16D
- Prize money: $474,005
- Surface: Hard / outdoor
- Location: Delray Beach, United States

Champions

Singles
- (Croatia) Marin Čilić

Doubles
- (United States) Bob Bryan / (United States) Mike Bryan
- Delray Beach Open

The 2014 Delray Beach International Tennis Championships was a professional tennis tournament played on hard courts. It is the 22nd edition of the tournament, and was part of the World Tour 250 series of the 2014 ATP World Tour. It took place in Delray Beach, Florida in the United States between February 17 and February 23, 2013. Seventh-seeded Marin Čilić won the singles title.

== Finals ==
=== Singles ===
- (Croatia) Marin Čilić defeated (South Africa) Kevin Anderson, 7–6^{(8–6)}, 6–7^{(7–9)}, 6–4

=== Doubles ===
- (United States) Bob Bryan / (United States) Mike Bryan defeated (Czech Republic) František Čermák / (Russia) Mikhail Elgin, 6–2, 6–3

== Singles main-draw entrants ==
=== Seeds ===
Country	Player	Rank^{1}	Seed
GER	Tommy Haas	12	1
USA	John Isner	13	2
JPN	Kei Nishikori	16	3
RSA	Kevin Anderson	22	4
~~CAN~~	~~Vasek Pospisil~~	~~25~~	~~5~~
ESP	Feliciano López	26	6
CRO	Marin Čilić	37	7
AUS	Lleyton Hewitt	40	8

- Rankings are as of February 10, 2014.

=== Other entrants ===
The following players received wildcards into the singles main draw:

- (Cyprus) Marcos Baghdatis
- (United States) Ryan Harrison
- (United States) Jack Sock

The following players received entry from the qualifying draw:

- (Portugal) Gastão Elias
- (United States) Steve Johnson
- (United States) Wayne Odesnik
- (United States) Rhyne Williams

The following player received entry as a lucky loser:

- (Australia) Samuel Groth

=== Withdrawals ===
Before the tournament

- (United States) Brian Baker
- (Canada) Vasek Pospisil (back injury)
- (Serbia) Janko Tipsarević

=== Retirements ===
- (Colombia) Alejandro Falla (back injury)
- (Croatia) Ivo Karlović (stomach virus)
- (Chinese Taipei) Lu Yen-hsun (neck injury)
- (Japan) Kei Nishikori (left hip injury)
- (Australia) Lleyton Hewitt (shoulder injury)

== Doubles main-draw entrants ==
=== Seeds ===
Country	Player	Country	Player	Rank^{1}	Seed
USA	Bob Bryan	USA	Mike Bryan	2	1
USA	Eric Butorac	RSA	Raven Klaasen	64	2
MEX	Santiago González	USA	Scott Lipsky	71	3
USA	Nicholas Monroe	GER	Simon Stadler	107	4

- Rankings are as of February 10, 2014.

=== Other entrants ===
The following pairs received wildcards into the doubles main draw:

- (United States) Ryan Harrison / (United States) Jack Sock
- (France) Adrian Mannarino / (United States) Michael Russell

The following pair received entry as alternates:

- (United States) Sekou Bangoura / (United States) Vahid Mirzadeh

=== Withdrawals ===
Before the tournament

- (Chinese Taipei) Lu Yen-hsun (neck injury)

During the tournament

- (Germany) Benjamin Becker (shoulder injury)
- (Poland) Tomasz Bednarek (stomach virus)
