= 2017 International Tennis Tournament of Cortina – Singles =

Singles
- 2017 International Tennis Tournament of Cortina

Final
- Champion: (Spain) Roberto Carballés Baena
- Runner-up: (Austria) Gerald Melzer
- Score: 6–1, 6–0

Events
Singles	Doubles
- International Tennis Tournament of Cortina

João Souza was the defending champion but chose not to defend his title.

Roberto Carballés Baena won the title after defeating Gerald Melzer 6–1, 6–0 in the final.

== Seeds ==
1. (Italy) Alessandro Giannessi (first round)
2. (Spain) Marcel Granollers (semifinals)
3. (Austria) Gerald Melzer (final)
4. (Spain) Roberto Carballés Baena (champion)
5. (Argentina) Guido Andreozzi (quarterfinals)
6. (Italy) Salvatore Caruso (first round)
7. (Italy) Federico Gaio (first round)
8. (Bosnia and Herzegovina) Aldin Šetkić (first round)

== Draw ==
Key

- Q = Qualifier
- WC = Wild card
- LL = Lucky loser
- Alt = Alternate
- ITF = ITF entry
- PR = Protected ranking
- SR = Special ranking
- SE = Special exempt
- JE = Junior exempt
- JR = Junior Accelerator Programme entrant
- CO = College Accelerator Programme entrant
- NG = Next Gen Accelerator Program entrant
- w/o = Walkover
- r = Retired
- d = Defaulted

=== Finals ===
Semifinals
(Italy) Matteo Viola	2	6^{5}
3	(Austria) Gerald Melzer	6	7^{7}
4	(Spain) Roberto Carballés Baena	5	7^{7}	7^{7}
2	(Spain) Marcel Granollers	7	6^{5}	6^{3}

Final
3	(Austria) Gerald Melzer	1	0
4	(Spain) Roberto Carballés Baena	6	6

=== Top half ===
First round
1	(Italy) A Giannessi	7	4	4
(Spain) P Martínez	5	6	6
WC	(Romania) D Dima	2	6^{2}
(Spain) C Taberner	6	7^{7}
Alt	(Croatia) V Galović	4	5
(Italy) M Viola	6	7
(Serbia) D Petrović	7	6
6	(Italy) S Caruso	5	3
3	(Austria) G Melzer	7	3	6
(Spain) J Munar	5	6	3
(Italy) M Donati	6^{4}	6	5
(Brazil) G Clezar	7^{7}	2	7
WC	(Italy) J Berrettini	0	6	6^{5}
Q	(Argentina) P Cachin	6	4	7^{7}
Q	(Serbia) M Zekić	7^{9}	7
7	(Italy) F Gaio	6^{7}	5

Second round
(Spain) P Martínez	1	1
(Spain) C Taberner	6	6
(Italy) M Viola	4	6	7
(Serbia) D Petrović	6	3	5
3	(Austria) G Melzer	7^{7}	6
(Brazil) G Clezar	6^{3}	3
Q	(Argentina) P Cachin	3	6	6
Q	(Serbia) M Zekić	6	4	3

Quarterfinals
(Spain) C Taberner	7^{7}	6^{5}	1
(Italy) M Viola	6^{5}	7^{7}	6
3	(Austria) G Melzer	6	6
Q	(Argentina) P Cachin	4	4

Semifinals
(Italy) M Viola	2	6^{5}
3	(Austria) G Melzer	6	7^{7}

=== Bottom half ===
First round
8	(Bosnia and Herzegovina) A Šetkić	6	1	4
(Belgium) Clément Geens	1	6	6
(Australia) C O'Connell	6	4
(Egypt) K-M Maamoun	1	2^{r}
(Portugal) G Oliveira	3	1
(Italy) A Arnaboldi	6	6
WC	(Italy) A Vavassori	1	1
4	(Spain) R Carballés Baena	6	6
5	(Argentina) G Andreozzi	6	6
(Spain) J Samper Montaña	1	3
WC	(Italy) Riccardo Balzerani	0	7^{7}	4
(Argentina) A Collarini	6	6^{5}	6
Q	(Italy) R Marcora	6	3	4
SE	(Italy) M Berrettini	3	6	6
Q	(Argentina) JP Paz	0	7^{7}	6^{1}
2	(Spain) M Granollers	6	6^{1}	7^{7}

Second round
(Belgium) C Geens	6	3
(Australia) C O'Connell	1	0^{r}
(Italy) A Arnaboldi	2	7^{7}	6^{4}
4	(Spain) R Carballés Baena	6	6^{2}	7^{7}
5	(Argentina) G Andreozzi	6	4	6
(Argentina) A Collarini	4	6	0
SE	(Italy) M Berrettini	4	6^{3}
2	(Spain) M Granollers	6	7^{7}

Quarterfinals
(Belgium) C Geens	4	1
4	(Spain) R Carballés Baena	6	6
5	(Argentina) G Andreozzi	3	1
2	(Spain) M Granollers	6	6

Semifinals
4	(Spain) R Carballés Baena	5	7^{7}	7^{7}
2	(Spain) M Granollers	7	6^{5}	6^{3}
