= 2014 Delray Beach International Tennis Championships – Singles =

Singles
- 2014 Delray Beach International Tennis Championships

Final
- Champion: (Croatia) Marin Čilić
- Runner-up: (South Africa) Kevin Anderson
- Score: 7–6^{(8–6)}, 6–7^{(7–9)}, 6–4

Details
- Draw: 32
- Seeds: 8

Events
Singles	Doubles
- Delray Beach Open

Ernests Gulbis was the defending champion, but chose to compete in Marseille instead.
Marin Čilić won the title, defeating Kevin Anderson in the final, 7–6^{(8–6)}, 6–7^{(7–9)}, 6–4.

== Seeds ==
1. (Germany) Tommy Haas (second round)
2. (United States) John Isner (semifinals)
3. (Japan) Kei Nishikori (second round, retired because of a left hip injury)
4. (South Africa) Kevin Anderson (final)
5. (Canada) Vasek Pospisil (withdrew because of a back injury)
6. (Spain) Feliciano López (quarterfinals)
7. (Croatia) Marin Čilić (champion)
8. (Australia) Lleyton Hewitt (second round, retired because of a shoulder injury)

== Draw ==
Key

- Q = Qualifier
- WC = Wild card
- LL = Lucky loser
- Alt = Alternate
- ITF = ITF entry
- PR = Protected ranking
- SR = Special ranking
- SE = Special exempt
- JE = Junior exempt
- JR = Junior Accelerator Programme entrant
- CO = College Accelerator Programme entrant
- NG = Next Gen Accelerator Program entrant
- w/o = Walkover
- r = Retired
- d = Defaulted

=== Finals ===
Semifinals
Q	(United States) Steve Johnson	2	4
4	(South Africa) Kevin Anderson	6	6
7	(Croatia) Marin Čilić	7^{7}	6
2	(United States) John Isner	6^{5}	3

Final
4	(South Africa) Kevin Anderson	6^{6}	7^{9}	4
7	(Croatia) Marin Čilić	7^{8}	6^{7}	6

=== Top half ===
First round
1	(Germany) T Haas	6	6
Q	(United States) W Odesnik	2	1
Q	(United States) S Johnson	6	6
(Kazakhstan) M Kukushkin	4	3
WC	(United States) J Sock	4	2
(France) A Mannarino	6	6
(United States) S Querrey	6	2	3
6	(Spain) F López	4	6	6
4	(South Africa) K Anderson	4	6	6
(United States) T Smyczek	6	1	3
(Croatia) I Karlović	7^{7}	6
LL	(Australia) S Groth	6^{4}	3
(Australia) M Matosevic	6	6
(Belgium) D Goffin	2	4
(United States) B Klahn	3	1
8	(Australia) L Hewitt	6	6

Second round
1	(Germany) T Haas	4	6	6^{2}
Q	(United States) S Johnson	6	2	7^{7}
(France) A Mannarino	6	4	2
6	(Spain) F López	4	6	6
4	(South Africa) K Anderson	1
(Croatia) I Karlović	0^{r}
(Australia) M Matosevic	7^{7}	0
8	(Australia) L Hewitt	6^{2}	0^{r}

Quarterfinals
Q	(United States) S Johnson	6	6
6	(Spain) F López	3	2
4	(South Africa) K Anderson	6^{3}	6	6
(Australia) M Matosevic	7^{7}	3	3

Semifinals
Q	(United States) S Johnson	2	4
4	(South Africa) K Anderson	6	6

=== Bottom half ===
First round
7	(Croatia) M Čilić	6	6
(Germany) B Becker	1	3
(Chinese Taipei) Y-h Lu	6	0^{r}
WC	(United States) R Harrison	4	1
(Russia) T Gabashvili	2	6	6
(Australia) M Ebden	6	3	2
Q	(Portugal) G Elias	1	7	2
3	(Japan) K Nishikori	6	5	6
Q	(United States) R Williams	6	4
(Colombia) A Falla	3	0^{r}
WC	(Cyprus) M Baghdatis	3	6	6
(Czech Republic) J Veselý	6	2	1
(Russia) A Bogomolov Jr.	0	2
(Israel) D Sela	6	6
(United States) M Russell	6	6^{3}	4
2	(United States) J Isner	4	7^{7}	6

Second round
7	(Croatia) M Čilić	6	6
WC	(United States) R Harrison	3	4
(Russia) T Gabashvili	4
3	(Japan) K Nishikori	2^{r}
Q	(United States) R Williams	6^{7}	6	6
WC	(Cyprus) M Baghdatis	7^{9}	4	2
(Israel) D Sela	6	1	6^{5}
2	(United States) J Isner	3	6	7^{7}

Quarterfinals
7	(Croatia) M Čilić	6	6
(Russia) T Gabashvili	2	3
Q	(United States) R Williams	6	3	2
2	(United States) J Isner	4	6	6

Semifinals
7	(Croatia) M Čilić	7^{7}	6
2	(United States) J Isner	6^{5}	3

== Qualifying ==
=== Seeds ===
1. (United States) Wayne Odesnik (qualified)
2. (United States) Steve Johnson (qualified)
3. (United States) Rhyne Williams (qualified)
4. (Belgium) Ruben Bemelmans (second round)
5. (Australia) Samuel Groth (qualifying competition, lucky loser)
6. (Portugal) Gastão Elias (qualified)
7. (Germany) Mischa Zverev (qualifying competition)
8. (Germany) Björn Phau (qualifying competition)

=== Qualifiers ===
1. (United States) Wayne Odesnik
2. (United States) Steve Johnson
3. (United States) Rhyne Williams
4. (Portugal) Gastão Elias

=== Lucky losers ===
1. (Australia) Samuel Groth

=== Qualifying draw ===
==== First qualifier ====
First round					Second round					Qualifying competition
					1	(United States) Wayne Odesnik	6	6^{5}	6
WC	(United States) Stefan Kozlov	2	6	3	WC	(United States) Sekou Bangoura	1	7^{7}	4
WC	(United States) Sekou Bangoura	6	4	6						1	(United States) Wayne Odesnik	7^{7}	6
										7	(Germany) Mischa Zverev	6^{5}	4
						(United States) Zachary Pelts	0	0
					7	(Germany) Mischa Zverev	6	6

==== Second qualifier ====
First round				Second round				Qualifying competition
				2	(United States) Steve Johnson	6	6
(Ecuador) Sebastián Rivera	6	4	6		(Ecuador) Sebastián Rivera	3	0
(United States) Jakub Wojcik	1	6	1					2	(United States) Steve Johnson	6	3	6
(Colombia) Álvaro Ochoa	3	0						5	(Australia) Samuel Groth	4	6	4
(Ecuador) Iván Endara	6	6			(Ecuador) Iván Endara	5	3
				5	(Australia) Samuel Groth	7	6

==== Third qualifier ====
First round				Second round				Qualifying competition
				3	(United States) Rhyne Williams	6	6
WC	(Poland) Tomasz Bednarek	1	1		(Brazil) Pedro Sakamoto	2	3
	(Brazil) Pedro Sakamoto	6	6					3	(United States) Rhyne Williams	6	6
	(Ukraine) Vitalii Shcherba	1	6^{5}					8	(Germany) Björn Phau	0	2
WC	(United States) Daniel Kerznerman	6	7^{7}	WC	(United States) Daniel Kerznerman	1	4
				8	(Germany) Björn Phau	6	6

==== Fourth qualifier ====
Second round
4	(Belgium) Ruben Bemelmans	6^{6}	3
(United States) Robby Ginepri	7^{8}	6
(Germany) Alexander Zverev	6	5	4
6	(Portugal) Gastão Elias	4	7	6

Qualifying competition
(United States) Robby Ginepri	6	4	3
6	(Portugal) Gastão Elias	3	6	6
