= 2016 International Tennis Tournament of Cortina =

- Date: 1–7 August
- Edition: 3rd
- Surface: Clay
- Location: Cortina d'Ampezzo, Italy

Champions

Singles
- (Brazil) João Souza

Doubles
- (United States) James Cerretani / (Austria) Philipp Oswald
← 2015 ·	International Tennis Tournament of Cortina	· 2017 →

The 2016 International Tennis Tournament of Cortina was a professional tennis tournament played on clay courts. It was the 3rd edition of the tournament which was part of the 2016 ATP Challenger Tour. It took place in Cortina d'Ampezzo, Italy between 1 and 7 August 2016.

== Singles main-draw entrants ==
=== Seeds ===
Country	Player	Rank^{1}	Seed
ARG	Carlos Berlocq	74	1
ESP	Íñigo Cervantes	81	2
ARG	Facundo Bagnis	91	3
RUS	Karen Khachanov	95	4
ESP	Roberto Carballés Baena	105	5
ARG	Renzo Olivo	109	6
ITA	Marco Cecchinato	139	7
ARG	Guido Andreozzi	142	8

- ^{1} Rankings are as of July 25, 2016.

=== Other entrants ===
The following players received wildcards into the singles main draw:

- (Italy) Lorenzo Sonego
- (Italy) Gianluca Mager
- (Russia) Karen Khachanov
- (Italy) Francisco Bahamonde

The following player entered the singles main draw as a special exempt:

- (Italy) Federico Gaio

The following players received entry from the qualifying draw:

- (Croatia) Viktor Galović
- (France) Calvin Hemery
- (Italy) Gianluigi Quinzi
- (Argentina) Andrea Collarini

The following player received entry as a lucky loser:

- (Bosnia and Herzegovina) Tomislav Brkić

== Champions ==
=== Singles ===
- (Brazil) João Souza def. (Serbia) Laslo Đere, 6–4, 7–6^{(7–4)}

=== Doubles ===
- (United States) James Cerretani / (Austria) Philipp Oswald def. (Spain) Roberto Carballés Baena / (Chile) Cristian Garín, 6–3, 6–2
