= 2017 International Tennis Tournament of Cortina – Doubles =

Doubles
- 2017 International Tennis Tournament of Cortina

Final
- Champions: (Argentina) Guido Andreozzi (Austria) Gerald Melzer
- Runners-up: (Australia) Steven de Waard (Japan) Ben McLachlan
- Score: 6–2, 7–6^{(7–4)}

Events
| Singles | Doubles |
- International Tennis Tournament of Cortina

James Cerretani and Philipp Oswald were the defending champions but chose not to defend their title.

Guido Andreozzi and Gerald Melzer won the title after defeating Steven de Waard and Ben McLachlan 6–2, 7–6^{(7–4)} in the final.

== Seeds ==
1. (Australia) Steven de Waard / (Japan) Ben McLachlan (final)
2. (Monaco) Romain Arneodo / (Italy) Riccardo Ghedin (semifinals)
3. (Brazil) Guilherme Clezar / (Portugal) Gonçalo Oliveira (first round, withdrew)
4. (Serbia) Danilo Petrović / (Serbia) Ilija Vučić (quarterfinals)

== Draw ==
Key

- Q = Qualifier
- WC = Wild card
- LL = Lucky loser
- Alt = Alternate
- ITF = ITF entry
- PR = Protected ranking
- SR = Special ranking
- SE = Special exempt
- JE = Junior exempt
- JR = Junior Accelerator Programme entrant
- CO = College Accelerator Programme entrant
- NG = Next Gen Accelerator Program entrant
- w/o = Walkover
- r = Retired
- d = Defaulted

First round
1 | (Australia) S de Waard (Japan) B McLachlan | 6 | 6
(Italy) S Caruso (Italy) M Viola | 4 | 3
(Argentina) A Collarini (Croatia) V Galović | 6 | 6
(Belgium) Clément Geens (Egypt) K-M Maamoun | 3 | 4
4 | (Serbia) D Petrović (Serbia) Ilija Vučić | 6 | 6
(United States) Alexander Centenari (Australia) R Junaid | 1 | 4
(Italy) M Bortolotti (Italy) A Vavassori | 6 | 6
WC | (Italy) A Giannessi (Italy) Stefano Meloccaro | 0 | 1
(Spain) R Carballés Baena (Spain) P Martínez | 4 | 3
(Argentina) G Andreozzi (Austria) G Melzer | 6 | 6
(Argentina) P Cachin (Argentina) JP Paz | w/o
3 | (Brazil) G Clezar (Portugal) G Oliveira
Alt | (Romania) D Dima (Serbia) M Zekić | 1 | 2
WC | (Italy) J Berrettini (Italy) M Berrettini | 6 | 6
WC | (Italy) Daniele Capecchi (Italy) Gianluca Di Nicola | 4 | 2
2 | (Monaco) R Arneodo (Italy) R Ghedin | 6 | 6

Quarterfinals
1 | (Australia) S de Waard (Japan) B McLachlan | 6 | 6
(Argentina) A Collarini (Croatia) V Galović | 2 | 2
4 | (Serbia) D Petrović (Serbia) I Vučić | 5 | 6 | [8]
(Italy) M Bortolotti (Italy) A Vavassori | 7 | 4 | [10]
(Argentina) G Andreozzi (Austria) G Melzer | 6 | 6
(Argentina) P Cachin (Argentina) JP Paz | 1 | 3
WC | (Italy) J Berrettini (Italy) M Berrettini | 3 | 4
2 | (Monaco) R Arneodo (Italy) R Ghedin | 6 | 6

Semifinals
1 | (Australia) S de Waard (Japan) B McLachlan | 6 | 7^{7}
(Italy) M Bortolotti (Italy) A Vavassori | 3 | 6^{3}
(Argentina) G Andreozzi (Austria) G Melzer | 7 | 6^{2} | [10]
2 | (Monaco) R Arneodo (Italy) R Ghedin | 5 | 7^{7} | [7]

Final
1 | (Australia) S de Waard (Japan) B McLachlan | 2 | 6^{4}
(Argentina) G Andreozzi (Austria) G Melzer | 6 | 7^{7}
