= 2011 Tennislife Cup =

- Date: 26 September–2 October
- Edition: 5th
- Location: Naples, Italy

Champions

Singles
- (Argentina) Leonardo Mayer

Doubles
- (Kazakhstan) Yuri Schukin / (Croatia) Antonio Veić
- Tennislife Cup

The 2011 Tennislife Cup was a professional tennis tournament played on clay courts. It was the fifth edition of the tournament which was part of the 2011 ATP Challenger Tour. It took place in Naples, Italy between 26 September and 2 October 2011.

== Singles main-draw entrants ==
=== Seeds ===
| Country | Player | Rank^{1} | Seed |
|---|---|---|---|
| ITA | Potito Starace | 50 | 1 |
| ARG | Carlos Berlocq | 71 | 2 |
| AUT | Andreas Haider-Maurer | 81 | 3 |
| ITA | Filippo Volandri | 86 | 4 |
| ARG | Diego Junqueira | 96 | 5 |
| POR | Frederico Gil | 100 | 6 |
| FRA | Stéphane Robert | 109 | 7 |
| FRA | Benoît Paire | 112 | 8 |

- ^{1} Rankings are as of September 19, 2011.

=== Other entrants ===
The following players received wildcards into the singles main draw:

- (Italy) Enrico Burzi
- (Italy) Marco Crugnola
- (Italy) Gianluca Naso
- (Italy) Matteo Trevisan

The following players received entry as a special exemption into the singles main draw:

- (Slovenia) Aljaž Bedene

The following players received entry from the qualifying draw:

- (Italy) Riccardo Bellotti
- (Serbia) Boris Pašanski
- (Italy) Walter Trusendi
- (Serbia) Miljan Zekić

The following players received entry as a lucky loser into the singles main draw:

- (Argentina) Diego Schwartzman

== Champions ==
=== Singles ===
(Argentina) Leonardo Mayer def. (Italy) Alessandro Giannessi, 6–3, 6–4

=== Doubles ===
(Kazakhstan) Yuri Schukin / (Croatia) Antonio Veić def. (Chinese Taipei) Hsieh Cheng-peng / (Chinese Taipei) Lee Hsin-han, 6–7^{(5–7)}, 7–5, [10–8]
