= 2017 International Tennis Tournament of Cortina =

- Date: 24–30 July
- Edition: 4th
- Surface: Clay
- Location: Cortina d'Ampezzo, Italy

Champions

Singles
- (Spain) Roberto Carballés Baena

Doubles
- (Argentina) Guido Andreozzi / (Austria) Gerald Melzer
← 2016 ·	International Tennis Tournament of Cortina	· 2018 →

The 2017 International Tennis Tournament of Cortina was a professional tennis tournament played on clay courts. It was the 4th edition of the tournament which was part of the 2017 ATP Challenger Tour. It took place in Cortina d'Ampezzo, Italy between 24 and 30 July 2017.

== Singles main-draw entrants ==
=== Seeds ===
Country	Player	Rank^{1}	Seed
ITA	Alessandro Giannessi	104	1
ESP	Marcel Granollers	111	2
AUT	Gerald Melzer	132	3
ESP	Roberto Carballés Baena	155	4
ARG	Guido Andreozzi	158	5
ITA	Salvatore Caruso	176	6
ITA	Federico Gaio	205	7
BIH	Aldin Šetkić	210	8

- ^{1} Rankings are as of 17 July 2017.

=== Other entrants ===
The following players received wildcards into the singles main draw:

- (Italy) Riccardo Balzerani
- (Italy) Jacopo Berrettini
- (Romania) Dragoș Dima
- (Italy) Andrea Vavassori

The following player received entry into the singles main draw as a special exempt:

- (Italy) Matteo Berrettini

The following player received entry into the singles main draw as an alternate:

- (Croatia) Viktor Galović

The following players received entry from the qualifying draw:

- (Argentina) Pedro Cachin
- (Italy) Roberto Marcora
- (Argentina) Juan Pablo Paz
- (Serbia) Miljan Zekić

== Champions ==
=== Singles ===
- (Spain) Roberto Carballés Baena def. (Austria) Gerald Melzer 6–1, 6–0.

=== Doubles ===
- (Argentina) Guido Andreozzi / (Austria) Gerald Melzer def. (Australia) Steven de Waard / (Japan) Ben McLachlan 6–2, 7–6^{(7–4)}.
