= 2013 Prague Open by Advantage Cars – Singles =

Singles
- 2013 Prague Open by Advantage Cars

Final
- Champion: (Ukraine) Oleksandr Nedovyesov
- Runner-up: (Spain) Javier Martí
- Score: 6–0, 6–1

Events
Singles	Doubles
← 2012 ·	Prague Open by Advantage Cars	· 2014 →

The men's singles of the 2013 Prague Open by Advantage Cars tournament was played on clay in Prague, Czech Republic.

Horacio Zeballos was the defending champion but decided not to participate.
Oleksandr Nedovyesov won the first edition of the event by defeating Javier Martí 6–0, 6–1 in the final.

== Seeds ==
1. (Austria) Andreas Haider-Maurer (quarterfinals)
2. (Italy) Filippo Volandri (second round)
3. (United States) Wayne Odesnik (first round)
4. (Spain) Rubén Ramírez Hidalgo (semifinals)
5. (Italy) Matteo Viola (second round)
6. (Spain) Daniel Muñoz de la Nava (first round)
7. (Ukraine) Oleksandr Nedovyesov (champion)
8. (Argentina) Facundo Argüello (first round)

== Draw ==
=== Key ===
- Q = Qualifier
- WC = Wild card
- LL = Lucky loser
- Alt = Alternate
- SE = Special exempt
- PR = Protected ranking
- ITF = ITF entry
- JE = Junior exempt
- w/o = Walkover
- r = Retired
- d = Defaulted
- SR = Special ranking

=== Finals ===
Semifinals
WC	(Czech Republic) Ivo Minář	0	4
(Spain) Javier Martí	6	6
4	(Spain) Rubén Ramírez Hidalgo	4	4
7	(Ukraine) Oleksandr Nedovyesov	6	6

Final
(Spain) Javier Martí	0	1
7	(Ukraine) Oleksandr Nedovyesov	6	6

=== Top half ===
First round
1	(Austria) A Haider-Maurer	6	6
WC	(Slovakia) Adrian Sikora	4	3
SE	(Spain) P Riba	7	6
Q	(Czech Republic) J Šátral	5	2
WC	(Czech Republic) I Minář	6	3	6
(Kazakhstan) E Korolev	2	6	3
(Japan) T Daniel	6	7
8	(Argentina) F Argüello	4	5
3	(United States) W Odesnik	1	6^{5}
(Kazakhstan) A Golubev	6	7^{7}
(Chile) J Aguilar	2	3
(Spain) J Samper-Montaña	6	6
WC	(Czech Republic) D Lojda	2	4
(Spain) J Martí	6	6
Q	(Czech Republic) Lukáš Maršoun	5	2
5	(Italy) M Viola	7	6

Second round
1	(Austria) A Haider-Maurer	6	6
SE	(Spain) P Riba	3	2
WC	(Czech Republic) I Minář	6	6
(Japan) T Daniel	3	2
(Kazakhstan) A Golubev	6	6
(Spain) J Samper-Montaña	1	3
(Spain) J Martí	4	6	6
5	(Italy) M Viola	6	3	1

Quarterfinals
1	(Austria) A Haider-Maurer	4	6	3
WC	(Czech Republic) I Minář	6	3	6
(Kazakhstan) A Golubev	6	1	4
(Spain) J Martí	4	6	6

Semifinals
WC	(Czech Republic) I Minář	0	4
(Spain) J Martí	6	6

=== Bottom half ===
First round
6	(Spain) D Muñoz de la Nava	2	4
(Chinese Taipei) T-h Yang	6	6
(Turkey) M İlhan	6	6^{2}	6
(Belgium) A De Greef	2	7^{7}	2
(Netherlands) B Westerhof	6	6
Q	(Czech Republic) Dominik Süč	1	2
(Canada) P Polansky	5	4
4	(Spain) R Ramírez Hidalgo	7	6
7	(Ukraine) O Nedovyesov	5	6	7
(Czech Republic) J Mertl	7	4	5
WC	(Czech Republic) Robin Staněk	3	3
(Italy) A di Mauro	6	6
Q	(Dominican Republic) V Estrella	2	6	5
(Slovakia) P Červenák	6	4	7
(Brazil) L Kirche	2	0
2	(Italy) F Volandri	6	6

Second round
(Chinese Taipei) T-h Yang	1	4
(Turkey) M İlhan	6	6
(Netherlands) B Westerhof	2	6	2
4	(Spain) R Ramírez Hidalgo	6	2	6
7	(Ukraine) O Nedovyesov	7	7
(Italy) A di Mauro	5	5
(Slovakia) P Červenák	3	6	7^{7}
2	(Italy) F Volandri	6	4	6^{4}

Quarterfinals
(Turkey) M İlhan	6	3	4
4	(Spain) R Ramírez Hidalgo	4	6	6
7	(Ukraine) O Nedovyesov	6	7^{7}
(Slovakia) P Červenák	4	6^{5}

Semifinals
4	(Spain) R Ramírez Hidalgo	4	4
7	(Ukraine) O Nedovyesov	6	6
