= 2010 Tennislife Cup – Doubles =

Doubles
- 2010 Tennislife Cup

Final
- Champions: (Spain) Daniel Muñoz-de la Nava (Italy) Simone Vagnozzi
- Runners-up: (Austria) Andreas Haider-Maurer (Germany) Bastian Knittel
- Score: 1–6, 7–6(5), [10–6]

Events
Singles	Doubles
- Tennislife Cup

Frederico Gil and Ivan Dodig were the defending champions, but Dodig decided not to participate.
As a result, Gil partnered up with James Cerretani. They lost to Yves Allegro and Jesse Huta Galung already in the first round.

== Seeds ==
1. (United States) James Cerretani / (Portugal) Frederico Gil (first round)
2. (Italy) Daniele Bracciali / (Italy) Flavio Cipolla (semifinals)
3. (India) Harsh Mankad / (United States) David Martin (semifinals)
4. (Philippines) Treat Conrad Huey / (United Kingdom) Dominic Inglot (first round)

== Draw ==
Key

- Q = Qualifier
- WC = Wild card
- LL = Lucky loser
- Alt = Alternate
- ITF = ITF entry
- PR = Protected ranking
- SR = Special ranking
- SE = Special exempt
- JE = Junior exempt
- JR = Junior Accelerator Programme entrant
- CO = College Accelerator Programme entrant
- NG = Next Gen Accelerator Program entrant
- w/o = Walkover
- r = Retired
- d = Defaulted

=== Draw ===
First round
1	(United States) J Cerretani (Portugal) F Gil	2	3
(Switzerland) Y Allegro (Netherlands) J Huta Galung	6	6
(Spain) D Muñoz-de la Nava (Italy) S Vagnozzi	6	6
(Italy) A di Mauro (Italy) A Giannessi	2	4
3	(India) H Mankad (United States) D Martin	7	7
WC	(Italy) E Fioravante (Serbia) F Krajinović	6^{5}	5
(Australia) S Kadir (India) P Raja	2	4
ALT	(Italy) A Brizzi (Italy) F Colangelo	6	6
(Austria) A Haider-Maurer (Germany) B Knittel	6	6
WC	(Italy) G Naso (Italy) F Torresi	4	2
WC	(Italy) W Trusendi (Italy) M Viola	7	7
4	(Philippines) TC Huey (United Kingdom) D Inglot	6^{3}	6^{3}
(Russia) D Sitak (Croatia) A Veić	6^{6}	4
(Italy) M Crugnola (Italy) A Motti	7	6
(Italy) P Lorenzi (Spain) A Ramos-Viñolas	3	3
2	(Italy) D Bracciali (Italy) F Cipolla	6	6

Quarterfinals
(Switzerland) Y Allegro (Netherlands) J Huta Galung	4	2
(Spain) D Muñoz-de la Nava (Italy) S Vagnozzi	6	6
3	(India) H Mankad (United States) D Martin	6	6
ALT	(Italy) A Brizzi (Italy) F Colangelo	4	1
(Austria) A Haider-Maurer (Germany) B Knittel	6	6
WC	(Italy) W Trusendi (Italy) M Viola	3	4
(Italy) M Crugnola (Italy) A Motti	3	7	[3]
2	(Italy) D Bracciali (Italy) F Cipolla	6	6^{4}	[10]

Semifinals
(Spain) D Muñoz-de la Nava (Italy) S Vagnozzi	7	6
3	(India) H Mankad (United States) D Martin	5	2
(Austria) A Haider-Maurer (Germany) B Knittel	6	6
2	(Italy) D Bracciali (Italy) F Cipolla	2	3

Final
(Spain) D Muñoz-de la Nava (Italy) S Vagnozzi	1	7	[10]
(Austria) A Haider-Maurer (Germany) B Knittel	6	6^{5}	[6]
