= Juan Lizariturry =

Spanish tennis player (born 1991)

- Country (sports): Spain
- Residence: San Sebastián, Basque Country
- Born: 20 April 1991 (age 34) San Sebastián, Basque Country
- Prize money: $84,156

Singles
- Career record: 0–0
- Career titles: 0
- Highest ranking: No. 304 (14 July 2014)

Doubles
- Career record: 0–0
- Career titles: 0
- Highest ranking: No. 329 (20 April 2015)

Juan Lizariturry Setién (born 20 April 1991) is a Spanish professional tennis player playing on the ATP Challenger Tour. On 14 July 2014, he reached his highest ATP singles ranking of No. 304 and his highest doubles ranking of No. 329 achieved on 20 April 2015.

== Tour titles ==
Legend
Grand Slam (0)
ATP Masters Series (0)
ATP Tour (0)
Challengers (1)

=== Doubles ===
Outcome	No.	Date	Tournament	Surface	Partner	Opponents	Score
Winner	1.	3 August 2014	Cortina d'Ampezzo	Clay	(Spain) Iñigo Cervantes Huegun	(Chinese Taipei) Lee Hsin-han (United States) Vahid Mirzadeh	7–5, 3–6, [10–8]
