= Pietro Fanucci =

Italian tennis player

- Country (sports): Italy
- Born: 21 July 1988 (age 36)
- Plays: Right-handed
- Prize money: $20,794

Singles
- Career record: 0–0 (at ATP Tour level, Grand Slam level, and in Davis Cup)
- Career titles: 0
- Highest ranking: No. 900 (14 September 2009)

Doubles
- Career record: 0–1 (at ATP Tour level, Grand Slam level, and in Davis Cup)
- Career titles: 3 ITF
- Highest ranking: No. 581 (29 September 2008)

Pietro Fanucci (born 21 July 1988) is a retired Italian tennis player.

Fanucci has a career high ATP singles ranking of 900 achieved on 14 September 2009. He also has a career high ATP doubles ranking of 581 achieved on 29 September 2008.

Fanucci made his ATP main draw debut at the 2007 Croatia Open Umag after receiving a wildcard for the doubles main draw.

== Challenger and Futures finals ==
=== Doubles: 6 (3–3) ===
Legend (doubles) ATP Challenger Tour (0–0) Futures (3–3)	Finals by surface Hard (0–2) Clay (3–1) Grass (0–0) Carpet (0–0)

Result	W–L	Date	Tournament	Tier	Surface	Partner	Opponents	Score
Win	1–0	Jan 2008	El Salvador F1	Futures	Clay	(Italy) Leonardo Azzaro	(Romania) Raian Luchici (United States) Brad Pomeroy	6–3, 1–6, [11–9]
Win	2–0	Feb 2008	Panama F1	Futures	Clay	(Italy) Leonardo Azzaro	(Romania) Raian Luchici (United States) Brad Pomeroy	3–6, 6–4, [10–4]
Loss	2–1	Mar 2008	Italy F3B	Futures	Clay	(Italy) Leonardo Azzaro	(Italy) Mirko Nasoni (Sweden) Filip Prpic	6–7^{(3–7)}, 3–6
Win	3–1	Jul 2008	Azerbaijan F1	Futures	Clay	(Italy) Matteo Volante	(Lebanon) Karim Alayli (Iran) Mohammed Mohazebnia	3–6, 6–4, [10–5]
Loss	3–2	Sep 2008	Italy F31	Futures	Hard	(Italy) Uros Vico	(Spain) David Ollivier-Baquero (Spain) Carles Reixach Itoiz	3–6, 6–4, [5–10]
Loss	3–3	Mar 2011	Turkey F7	Futures	Hard	(Italy) Francesco Piccari	(Czech Republic) Roman Jebavý (Slovakia) Adrian Sikora	6–4, 2–6, [6–10]
