= Tennislife Cup =

Defunct tennis tournament
- Abolished: 2011
- Location: Naples, Italy
- Category: ATP Challenger Tour
- Surface: Clay / Outdoors
- Draw: 32S/32Q/16D
- Prize money: €42,500
- Website: Official Website

The Tennislife Cup was a tennis tournament held in Naples, Italy from 2007 until 2011. The event was part of the ATP Challenger Tour and was played on outdoor red clay courts.

== Past finals ==
=== Singles ===
Year	Champion	Runner-up	Score
2011	(Argentina) Leonardo Mayer	(Italy) Alessandro Giannessi	6–3, 6–4
2010	(Italy) Fabio Fognini	(Serbia) Boris Pašanski	6–4, 4–2, RET.
2009	(Portugal) Frederico Gil	(Italy) Potito Starace	2–6, 6–1, 6–4
2008	(Italy) Tomas Tenconi	(Algeria) Lamine Ouahab	6–7, 6–3, 6–1
2007	(Russia) Yuri Schukin	(Argentina) Martín Vassallo Argüello	7–6, 6–1

=== Doubles ===
Year	Champion	Runner-up	Score
2011	(Kazakhstan) Yuri Schukin (Croatia) Antonio Veić	(Chinese Taipei) Hsieh Cheng-peng (Chinese Taipei) Lee Hsin-han	6–7^{(5–7)}, 7–5, [10–8]
2010	(Spain) Daniel Muñoz-de la Nava (Italy) Simone Vagnozzi	(Austria) Andreas Haider-Maurer (Germany) Bastian Knittel	1–6, 7–6(5), [10–6]
2009	(Portugal) Frederico Gil (Croatia) Ivan Dodig	(Brazil) Thiago Alves (Czech Republic) Lukáš Rosol	6–1, 6–3
2008	(Italy) Leonardo Azzaro (Italy) Alessandro Motti	(Bosnia and Herzegovina) Ismar Gorčić (Italy) Antonio Maiorano	6–7, 6–3, [10–7]
2007	(Germany) Tomas Behrend (Germany) Christopher Kas	(Italy) Leonardo Azzaro (Italy) Alessandro Motti	7–6, 6–2
