= Lee Hsin-han =

Taiwanese tennis player

Lee Hsin-han 李欣翰
- Country (sports): Chinese Taipei
- Residence: Taiwan
- Born: May 19, 1988 (age 38) Taiwan
- Height: 1.81 m (5 ft 11 in)
- Plays: Right-handed (two-handed backhand)
- Prize money: US$ 142,344

Singles
- Career record: 1–3 (ATP World Tour and Grand Slam main draw matches)
- Career titles: 0; 0 Challenger, 0 Futures
- Highest ranking: No. 537 (30 April 2012)

Doubles
- Career record: 2–8 (ATP World Tour and Grand Slam main draw matches)
- Career titles: 0; 8 Challenger, 24 Futures
- Highest ranking: No. 93 (11 February 2013)

Grand Slam doubles results
- Australian Open: 1R (2015)
- Wimbledon: Q1 (2012)
Medal record
Representing Chinese Taipei
Men's Tennis
Universiade
Silver medal – second place	2015 Gwangju	Men's Team
Bronze medal – third place	2015 Gwangju	Men's doubles
Gold medal – first place	2013 Kazan	Men's doubles
Silver medal – second place	2013 Kazan	Men's team
Bronze medal – third place	2013 Kazan	Mixed doubles
Gold medal – first place	2011 Shenzhen	Men's doubles
Gold medal – first place	2011 Shenzhen	Mixed doubles
Bronze medal – third place	2011 Shenzhen	Men's team
Gold medal – first place	2009 Belgrade	Men's doubles
Bronze medal – third place	2009 Belgrade	Men's team
Asian Games
Bronze medal – third place	2010 Guangzhou	Men's doubles
- Last updated on: 16 June 2011.

The person who is the subject of this biography has a Chinese name; his family name is Lee.

Lee Hsin-han
- Traditional Chinese: 李欣翰
- Simplified Chinese: 李欣翰
Transcriptions
Standard Mandarin
- Hanyu Pinyin: Lǐ Xīnhàn

Lee Hsin-han (Chinese: 李欣翰; born May 19, 1988) is a Taiwanese professional male tennis player. He specializes in doubles.

Lee is a right-handed player and started playing tennis at the age of 7. He has a 54% win rate in singles with 183 wins to date, and a 66% win rate in doubles with 401 wins to date.

== ATP Challenger and ITF Futures finals ==
=== Singles: 3 (0–3) ===
Legend ATP Challenger (0–0) ITF Futures (0–3)	Finals by surface Hard (0–1) Clay (0–1) Grass (0–0) Carpet (0–1)

Result	W–L	Date	Tournament	Tier	Surface	Opponent	Score
Loss	0–1	Sep 2006	Japan F9, Osaka	Futures	Carpet	(Japan) Yūichi Sugita	2–6, 3–6
Loss	0–2	Jul 2010	Japan F8, Sapporo	Futures	Clay	(Japan) Hiroki Moriya	1–6, 3–6
Loss	0–3	May 2011	China F6, Guiyang	Futures	Hard	(China) Ze Zhang	1–6, 0–6

=== Doubles: 73 (32–41) ===
Legend ATP Challenger (8–18) ITF Futures (24–23)	Finals by surface Hard (22–26) Clay (9–10) Grass (0–2) Carpet (1–3)

Result	W–L	Date	Tournament	Tier	Surface	Partner	Opponents	Score
Win	1–0	Sep 2004	Sri Lanka F1, Colombo	Futures	Clay	(Chinese Taipei) Liu Tai-Wei	(Chinese Taipei) Chang Huai-En (Chinese Taipei) Hsieh Wang-Cheng	6–1, 6–3
Loss	1–1	Jun 2005	China F3, Wuhan	Futures	Hard	(Chinese Taipei) Liu Tai-Wei	(China) Lu Hao (China) Yu Xinyuan	6–7^{(4–7)}, 3–6
Loss	1–2	Aug 2005	Indonesia F3, Makassar	Futures	Hard	(Chinese Taipei) Hsieh Wang-Cheng	(Indonesia) Bonit Wiryawan (Indonesia) Suwandi Suwandi	2–6, 6–7^{(4–7)}
Loss	1–3	Dec 2005	Sri Lanka F2, Colombo	Futures	Clay	(Chinese Taipei) Yi Chu-Huan	(India) Ravi-Shankar Pathanjali (India) Vinod Sridhar	3–6, 3–6
Loss	1–4	Mar 2006	China F3, Shenzhen	Futures	Hard	(Hong Kong) Yu Hiu Tung	(Netherlands) Jesse Huta Galung (Netherlands) Antal van Der Duim	5–7, 1–6
Win	2–4	Aug 2006	Indonesia F2, Jakarta	Futures	Hard	(Hong Kong) Yu Hiu Tung	(Chinese Taipei) Chang Huai-En (Chinese Taipei) Hsieh Wang-Cheng	6–2, 3–6, 7–6^{(7–4)}
Loss	2–5	Aug 2006	Indonesia F3, Manado	Futures	Hard	(Chinese Taipei) Peng Hsien-yin	(Indonesia) Elbert Sie (Indonesia) Bonit Wiryawan	6–4, 3–6, 4–6
Loss	2–6	Sep 2006	Japan F9, Osaka	Futures	Carpet	(Chinese Taipei) Yang Tsung-hua	(Japan) Yaoki Ishii (Japan) Hiroki Kondo	4–6, 3–6
Win	3–6	Sep 2006	Japan F10, Sapporo	Futures	Carpet	(Chinese Taipei) Yi Chu-Huan	(United States) James Pade (United States) Minh Le	4–6, 7–6^{(7–2)}, 6–4
Loss	3–7	May 2007	China F2, Tianjin	Futures	Hard	(Chinese Taipei) Chang Huai-En	(China) Gong Maoxin (China) Zhe Li	3–6, 6–3, 1–6
Loss	3–8	Jun 2007	India F5, Delhi	Futures	Hard	(Chinese Taipei) Yang Tsung-hua	(India) Tushar Liberhan (India) Sanam Singh	4–6, 5–7
Win	4–8	Jun 2007	China F4, Guangzhou	Futures	Hard	(Chinese Taipei) Yang Tsung-hua	(China) Yu Xinyuan (China) Zeng Shaoxuan	6–4, 2–6, 7–6^{(7–5)}
Win	5–8	Mar 2008	India F4, Gurgaon	Futures	Hard	(China) Wang Yu	(India) Divij Sharan (India) Vishnu Vardhan	7–6^{(7–4)}, 6–4
Loss	5–9	Jul 2008	Japan F7, Tokyo	Futures	Hard	(United States) Minh Le	(China) Gong Maoxin (China) Zhe Li	2–6, 1–6
Win	6–9	Sep 2008	Thailand F6, Nonthaburi	Futures	Hard	(Germany) Peter Gojowczyk	(Switzerland) Patrick Eichenberger (Sri Lanka) Harshana Godamanna	4–6, 7–6^{(7–1)}, [11–9]
Win	7–9	Oct 2008	Pakistan F1, Islamabad	Futures	Clay	(Chinese Taipei) Chen I-ta	(Germany) Patrick Taubert (Slovakia) Adrian Sikora	6–2, 7–5
Win	8–9	Oct 2008	Pakistan F2, Islamabad	Futures	Clay	(Chinese Taipei) Chen I-ta	(Russia) Mikhail Vasiliev (Kazakhstan) Syrym Abdukhalikov	6–3, 6–3
Loss	8–10	Nov 2008	Cancún, Mexico	Challenger	Clay	(Chinese Taipei) Yang Tsung-hua	(Poland) Łukasz Kubot (Austria) Oliver Marach	5–7, 2–6
Win	9–10	Jan 2009	China F1, Guangzhou	Futures	Hard	(Chinese Taipei) Yang Tsung-hua	(China) Wang Yu (China) Zhe Li	6–0, 6–3
Win	10–10	Mar 2009	India F2, Kolkata	Futures	Clay	(Chinese Taipei) Chen I-ta	(Monaco) Benjamin Balleret (India) Rohan Gajjar	6–4, 6–4
Loss	10–11	Jun 2009	Malaysia F1, Kuala Lumpur	Futures	Hard	(Chinese Taipei) Yang Tsung-hua	(Spain) Arnau Brugués Davi (Italy) Luigi D'Agord	6–7^{(4–7)}, 4–6
Win	11–11	Jul 2009	Korea F6, Gyeongsan	Futures	Hard	(Chinese Taipei) Yang Tsung-hua	(Chinese Taipei) Ti Chen (Japan) Satoshi Iwabuchi	7–6^{(7–4)}, 5–7, [10–8]
Win	12–11	Sep 2009	Thailand F3, Nonthaburi	Futures	Hard	(Chinese Taipei) Yang Tsung-hua	(Indonesia) Christopher Rungkat (Indonesia) Nesa Arta	7–6^{(7–4)}, 6–4
Loss	12–12	Oct 2009	Japan F8, Kashiwa	Futures	Hard	(Chinese Taipei) Yang Tsung-hua	(Chinese Taipei) Yi Chu-Huan (Japan) Junn Mitsuhashi	4–6, 2–6
Loss	12–13	Oct 2009	Japan F9, Yokohama	Futures	Clay	(Japan) Bumpei Sato	(Japan) Hiromasa Oku (Japan) Kousuke Sugimoto	0–6, 6–4, [8–10]
Loss	12–14	Nov 2009	Chuncheon, South Korea	Challenger	Hard	(Chinese Taipei) Yang Tsung-hua	(Latvia) Andis Juška (Russia) Dmitri Sitak	6–3, 3–6, [2–10]
Loss	12–15	Feb 2010	Australia F2, Berri	Futures	Grass	(Chinese Taipei) Huang Liang-chi	(Australia) Sam Groth (Australia) Matthew Ebden	3–6, 6–7^{(7–9)}
Loss	12–16	Mar 2010	China F1, Kaiyuan	Futures	Hard	(Chinese Taipei) Yang Tsung-hua	(Australia) Sadik Kadir (India) Purav Raja	6–4, 3–6, [9–11[
Loss	12–17	Mar 2010	China F2, Mengzi	Futures	Hard	(Chinese Taipei) Yang Tsung-hua	(Solomon Islands) Michael Leong (Germany) Sebastian Rieschick	2–6, 5–7
Loss	12–18	Jun 2010	Japan F6, Kusatsu	Futures	Carpet	(Japan) Yuichi Ito	(Chinese Taipei) Hsieh Cheng-peng (Chinese Taipei) Chen I-ta	4–6, 5–7
Win	13–18	Jul 2010	Japan F8, Sapporo	Futures	Clay	(Japan) Bumpei Sato	(Japan) Tasuku Iwami (Japan) Hiroki Kondo	3–6, 6–4, [15–13]
Loss	13–19	Aug 2010	Samarkand, Uzbekistan	Challenger	Clay	(Chinese Taipei) Yang Tsung-hua	(Latvia) Andis Juška (Latvia) Deniss Pavlovs	5–7, 3–6
Loss	13–20	Jan 2011	China F1, Mengzi	Futures	Hard	(Chinese Taipei) Yi Chu-Huan	(China) Gong Maoxin (China) Zhe Li	1–6, 1–6
Loss	13–21	Jan 2011	China F2, Mengzi	Futures	Hard	(Chinese Taipei) Yi Chu-Huan	(China) Gong Maoxin (China) Zhe Li	6–4, 3–6, [4–10]
Win	14–21	Feb 2011	Cambodia F2, Phnom Penh	Futures	Hard	(Chinese Taipei) Huang Liang-chi	(India) Yuki Bhambri (India) Vivek Shokeen	6–3, 6–4
Loss	14–22	Apr 2011	Thailand F2, Khon Kaen	Futures	Hard	(Japan) Bumpei Sato	(Thailand) Weerapat Doakmaiklee (Thailand) Kittiphong Wachiramanowong	6–7^{(9–11)}, 2–6
Loss	14–23	Apr 2011	India F3, Chandigarh	Futures	Hard	(Japan) Bumpei Sato	(India) Vishnu Vardhan (India) Divij Sharan	4–6, 6–4, [7–10]
Win	15–23	May 2011	China F5, Nanjing	Futures	Hard	(Chinese Taipei) Hsieh Cheng-peng	(Japan) Junn Mitsuhashi (Japan) Bumpei Sato	6–2, 6–4
Win	16–23	May 2011	China F6, Guiyang	Futures	Hard	(Chinese Taipei) Hsieh Cheng-peng	(Chinese Taipei) Huang Liang-chi (China) Bowen Ouyang	6–4, 7–6^{(7–3)}
Win	17–23	May 2011	Indonesia F1, Jakarta	Futures	Hard	(Chinese Taipei) Hsieh Cheng-peng	(Japan) Yuichi Ito (Japan) Kento Takeuchi	7–6^{(7–5)}, 7–6^{(7–4)}
Win	18–23	Jun 2011	Japan F5, Karuizawa	Futures	Clay	(Japan) Bumpei Sato	(Japan) Junn Mitsuhashi (Japan) Kento Takeuchi	6–4, 5–7, [12–10]
Loss	18–24	Jun 2011	Japan F6, Kashiwa	Futures	Hard	(Chinese Taipei) Hsieh Cheng-peng	(India) Yi Chu-Huan (Indonesia) Christopher Rungkat	6–7^{(2–7)}, 3–6
Loss	18–25	Jun 2011	Japan F7, Tokyo	Futures	Grass	(Chinese Taipei) Hsieh Cheng-peng	(India) Yi Chu-Huan (Indonesia) Christopher Rungkat	4–6, 3–6
Win	19–25	Jul 2011	Japan F8, Sapporo	Futures	Clay	(Chinese Taipei) Hsieh Cheng-peng	(Thailand) Kittiphong Wachiramanowong (Japan) Bumpei Sato	6–4, 3–6, [10–7]
Win	20–25	Jul 2011	Chinese Taipei F1, Taipei	Futures	Hard	(Chinese Taipei) Hsieh Cheng-peng	(Chinese Taipei) Yi Chu-Huan (Japan) Yuichi Ito	6–3, 6–2
Win	21–25	Jul 2011	Chinese Taipei F2, Taipei	Futures	Hard	(Chinese Taipei) Hsieh Cheng-peng	(Chinese Taipei) Huang Liang-chi (South Korea) Jeong Suk-Young	1–6, 6–3, [10–5]
Win	22–25	Jul 2011	Wuhai, China	Challenger	Hard	(Chinese Taipei) Yang Tsung-hua	(China) Feng He (China) Zhang Ze	6–2, 7–6^{(7–4)}
Loss	22–26	Oct 2011	Napoli, Italy	Challenger	Clay	(Chinese Taipei) Hsieh Cheng-peng	(Kazakhstan) Yuri Schukin (Croatia) Antonio Veić	7–6^{(7–5)}, 5–7, [8–10]
Loss	22–27	Jan 2012	China F1, Shenzhen	Futures	Hard	(Chinese Taipei) Peng Hsien-yin	(France) Pierre-Hugues Herbert (Slovakia) Ivo Klec	4–6, 2–6
Win	23–27	Jan 2012	China F2, Shenzhen	Futures	Hard	(Chinese Taipei) Hsieh Cheng-peng	(United States) Austin Krajicek (United States) Devin Britton	7–6^{(7–5)}, 6–0
Loss	23–28	Mar 2012	Singapore, Singapore	Challenger	Hard	(Chinese Taipei) Hsieh Cheng-peng	(Slovakia) Kamil Čapkovič (Israel) Amir Weintraub	4–6, 4–6
Loss	23–29	Mar 2012	Kyoto, Japan	Challenger	Carpet	(Chinese Taipei) Hsieh Cheng-peng	(Thailand) Sanchai Ratiwatana (Thailand) Sonchat Ratiwatana	6–7^{(7–9)}, 3–6
Win	24–29	Apr 2012	Chinese Taipei F1, Kaohsiung	Futures	Hard	(Chinese Taipei) Hsieh Cheng-peng	(Russia) Denis Matsukevich (Thailand) Danai Udomchoke	5–7, 6–1, [10–8]
Loss	24–30	May 2012	Busan, South Korea	Challenger	Hard	(Chinese Taipei) Hsieh Cheng-peng	(India) Yuki Bhambri (India) Divij Sharan	6–1, 1–6, [5–10]
Win	25–30	May 2012	Thailand F3, Bangkok	Futures	Hard	(Chinese Taipei) Peng Hsien-yin	(Indonesia) Christopher Rungkat (Indonesia) David Agung Susanto	7–6^{(7–3)}, 6–3
Win	26–30	Jun 2012	Prostějov, Czech Republic	Challenger	Clay	(Chinese Taipei) Hsieh Cheng-peng	(Australia) Colin Ebelthite (Australia) John Peers	7–5, 7–5
Win	27–30	Aug 2012	Karshi, Uzbekistan	Challenger	Hard	(Chinese Taipei) Peng Hsien-yin	(Australia) Brydan Klein (Japan) Yasutaka Uchiyama	7–6^{(12–10)}, 6–2
Loss	27–31	Sep 2012	Bangkok, Thailand	Challenger	Hard	(Chinese Taipei) Peng Hsien-yin	(India) Divij Sharan (India) Vishnu Vardhan	3–6, 4–6
Win	28–31	Oct 2012	Seoul, South Korea	Challenger	Hard	(Chinese Taipei) Peng Hsien-yin	(South Korea) Lim Yong-kyu (South Korea) Nam Ji-sung	7–6^{(7–3)}, 7–5
Win	29–31	Jan 2013	Honolulu, United States	Challenger	Hard	(Chinese Taipei) Peng Hsien-yin	(United States) Tennys Sandgren (United States) Rhyne Williams	6–7^{(1–7)}, 6–2, [10–5]
Win	30–31	Jun 2013	Prague, Czech Republic	Challenger	Clay	(Chinese Taipei) Peng Hsien-yin	(United States) Vahid Mirzadeh (United States) Denis Zivkovic	6–4, 4–6, [10–5]
Loss	30–32	Aug 2013	Liberec, Czech Republic	Challenger	Clay	(Australia) Colin Ebelthite	(Australia) Rameez Junaid (Germany) Tim Pütz	0–6, 2–6
Loss	30–33	Sep 2013	Shanghai, China	Challenger	Hard	(Chinese Taipei) Peng Hsien-yin	(Thailand) Sanchai Ratiwatana (Thailand) Sonchat Ratiwatana	3–6, 4–6
Loss	30–34	Nov 2013	Seoul, South Korea	Challenger	Hard	(Chinese Taipei) Peng Hsien-yin	(Croatia) Marin Draganja (Croatia) Mate Pavić	5–7, 2–6
Loss	30–35	Nov 2013	Yeongol, South Korea	Challenger	Hard	(Chinese Taipei) Peng Hsien-yin	(Croatia) Marin Draganja (Croatia) Mate Pavić	4–6, 6–4, [7–10]
Loss	30–36	Mar 2014	Guangzhou, China	Challenger	Hard	(Israel) Amir Weintraub	(Thailand) Sanchai Ratiwatana (Thailand) Sonchat Ratiwatana	2–6, 4–6
Loss	30–37	Jun 2014	Prague, Czech Republic	Challenger	Clay	(China) Zhang Ze	(Czech Republic) Roman Jebavý (Czech Republic) Jiří Veselý	1–6, 3–6
Loss	30–38	Aug 2014	Cortina, Italy	Challenger	Clay	(United States) Vahid Mirzadeh	(Spain) Juan Lizariturry (Spain) Íñigo Cervantes Huegun	5–7, 6–3, [8–10]
Loss	30–39	Jun 2015	Caltanissetta, Italy	Challenger	Clay	(Italy) Alessandro Motti	(Argentina) Guido Andreozzi (Argentina) Guillermo Durán	3–6, 2–6
Loss	30–40	Aug 2015	Cortina, Italy	Challenger	Clay	(Italy) Alessandro Motti	(Italy) Paolo Lorenzi (Italy) Matteo Viola	7–6^{(7–5)}, 4–6, [3–10]
Loss	30–41	Sep 2015	Nanchang, China	Challenger	Hard	(Israel) Amir Weintraub	(France) Jonathan Eysseric (Estonia) Jürgen Zopp	4–6, 2–6
Win	31–41	Nov 2015	Suzhou, China	Challenger	Hard	(Ukraine) Denys Molchanov	(China) Gong Maoxin (Chinese Taipei) Peng Hsien-yin	3–6, 7–6^{(7–5)}, [10–4]
Win	32–41	Nov 2015	Hua Hin, Thailand	Challenger	Hard	(Chinese Taipei) Lu Yen-hsun	(Germany) Andre Begemann (India) Purav Raja	walkover

== Davis Cup ==
=== Singles performances (1–3) ===
Edition	Round	Date	Against	Surface	Opponent	Win/Lose	Result
2007 Asia/Oceania Zone Group I	1R	9 February 2007	Thailand	Carpet (indoor)	(Thailand) Danai Udomchoke	Loss	1–6, 1–6, 2–6
2007 Asia/Oceania Zone Group I	1R	11 February 2007	Thailand	Carpet (indoor)	(Thailand) Sonchat Ratiwatana	Loss	6–7^{(7–9)}, 4–6, 3–6
2010 Asia/Oceania Zone Group I	1R	7 March 2010	Australia	Hard (outdoor)	(Australia) Bernard Tomic	Loss	7–6^{(7–4)}, 0–6, 3–6
2010 Asia/Oceania Zone Group I	1R RPO	11 July 2010	Philippines	Hard (outdoor)	(Philippines) Ruben Gonzales	Win	6–3, 6–0

- RPO/QF = Relegation Play–offs/Quarterfinal
