= International Tennis Tournament of Cortina =

- 2017 International Tennis Tournament of Cortina

ATP Challenger Tour
- Event name: International Tennis Tournament of Cortina
- Location: Cortina d'Ampezzo, Italy
- Venue: Tennis Country Club Cortina
- Category: ATP Challenger Tour
- Surface: Clay (red)
- Draw: 32S/32Q/16D
- Prize money: €42,500+H
- Website: Website

The International Tennis Tournament of Cortina was a professional tennis tournament played on outdoor red clay courts. It was part of the Association of Tennis Professionals (ATP) Challenger Tour. It was held annually in Cortina d'Ampezzo, Italy from 2014 until 2017.

== Past finals ==
=== Singles ===
Year	Champion	Runner-up	Score
2017	(Spain) Roberto Carballés Baena	(Austria) Gerald Melzer	6–1, 6–0
2016	(Brazil) João Souza	(Serbia) Laslo Đere	6–4, 7–6^{(7–4)}
2015	(Italy) Paolo Lorenzi	(Argentina) Máximo González	6–3, 7–5
2014	(Serbia) Filip Krajinović	(Italy) Federico Gaio	2–6, 7–6^{(7–5)}, 7–5

=== Doubles ===
Year	Champions	Runners-up	Score
2017	(Argentina) Guido Andreozzi (Austria) Gerald Melzer	(Australia) Steven de Waard (Japan) Ben McLachlan	6–2, 7–6^{(7–4)}
2016	(United States) James Cerretani (Austria) Philipp Oswald	(Spain) Roberto Carballés Baena (Chile) Cristian Garín	6–3, 6–2
2015	(Italy) Paolo Lorenzi (Italy) Matteo Viola	(Chinese Taipei) Lee Hsin-han (Italy) Alessandro Motti	6–7^{(5–7)}, 6–4, [10–3]
2014	(Spain) Iñigo Cervantes Huegun (Spain) Juan Lizariturry	(Chinese Taipei) Lee Hsin-han (United States) Vahid Mirzadeh	7–5, 3–6, [10–8]
