= Adelchi Virgili =

Italian tennis player

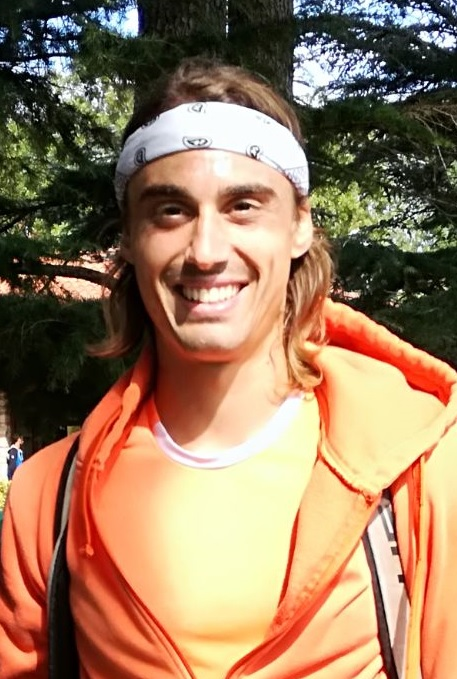
- Country (sports): Italy
- Born: 10 March 1990 (age 35); Fiesole
- Prize money: $31,135

Singles
- Career record: 0–0 (at ATP Tour level, Grand Slam level, and in Davis Cup)
- Career titles: 1 ITF
- Highest ranking: No. 394 (16 October 2022)
- Current ranking: No. 1542 (17 January 2022)

Doubles
- Career record: 0–1 (at ATP Tour level, Grand Slam level, and in Davis Cup)
- Career titles: 1 ITF
- Highest ranking: No. 378 (9 September 2013)
- Current ranking: No. 1115 (17 January 2022)
- Last updated on: 17 January 2022.

Adelchi Virgili (born 10 March 1990) is an Italian tennis player.

Virgili has a career high ATP singles ranking of 394 achieved on 16 October 2017. He also has a career high ATP doubles ranking of 378 achieved on 9 September 2013.

Virgili made his ATP main draw debut at the 2016 Delray Beach International Tennis Championships in the doubles draw partnering Sander Groen.
