= Vahid Mirzadeh =

American tennis player

- Full name: Vahid Mirzadeh
- Country (sports): United States
- Residence: Wellington, Florida, U.S.
- Born: December 28, 1986 (age 39) Lake Worth Beach, Florida, U.S.
- Height: 1.78 m (5 ft 10 in)
- Plays: Right-handed (two handed-backhand)
- Prize money: $52,211

Singles
- Career titles: 0
- Highest ranking: No. 806 (5 November 2007)

Doubles
- Career record: 1–2 (at ATP Tour level, Grand Slam level, and in Davis Cup)
- Career titles: 7 ITF
- Highest ranking: No. 169 (14 October 2013)

Grand Slam doubles results
- US Open: 1R (2004)

Vahid Mirzadeh (born December 28, 1986, in Lake Worth Beach, Florida) is an American tennis player.

Mirzadeh was a wildcard entrant at the 2014 US Open in the doubles event, where he partnered Philip Simmonds, but they lost in the first round to Brian Baker and Rajeev Ram 2–6, 3–6.

Mirzadeh made his ATP main draw debut at the 2014 Delray Beach International Tennis Championships in the doubles event partnering Sekou Bangoura. The pair had only made through the doubles draw as an alternate team but in the first round they defeated the 2nd seeds Eric Butorac and Raven Klaasen 7–5, 3–6, [10–5]. However, their run came to an end in the quarterfinals, which they lost to Sam Groth and Max Mirnyi 6–7^{(5–7)}, 4–6.
