= 2006 ECM Prague Open – Women's doubles =

Women's doubles
- 2006 ECM Prague Open

Final
- Champions: (France) Marion Bartoli (Israel) Shahar Pe'er
- Runners-up: (United States) Ashley Harkleroad (United States) Bethanie Mattek
- Score: 6–4, 6–4

Details
- Draw: 16
- Seeds: 4

Events
Singles	men	women
Doubles	men	women
← 2005 ·	ECM Prague Open	· 2007 →

The women's doubles of the 2006 ECM Prague Open tournament was played on clay in Prague, Czech Republic.

Émilie Loit and Nicole Pratt were the defending champions, but none competed this year, with Loit choosing to focus on the singles tournament.

Marion Bartoli and Shahar Pe'er won the title by defeating Ashley Harkleroad and Bethanie Mattek 6–4, 6–4 in the final.

== Seeds ==
1. (United States) Martina Navratilova / (Czech Republic) Barbora Strýcová (quarterfinals)
2. (France) Marion Bartoli / (Israel) Shahar Pe'er (champions)
3. (Italy) Maria Elena Camerin / (China) Peng Shuai (first round)
4. (Czech Republic) Gabriela Navrátilová / (Czech Republic) Michaela Paštiková (semifinals)

== Draw ==
=== Key ===
- Q = Qualifier
- WC = Wild card
- LL = Lucky loser
- Alt = Alternate
- ITF = ITF entry
- PR = Protected ranking
- SR = Special ranking
- SE = Special exempt
- JE = Junior exempt
- JR = Junior Accelerator Programme entrant
- CO = College Accelerator Programme entrant
- NG = Next Gen Accelerator Program entrant
- w/o = Walkover
- r = Retired
- d = Defaulted

=== Draw ===
First round
1	(United States) M Navratilova (Czech Republic) B Strýcová	6	6
(Czech Republic) O Blahotová (United States) A Rolle	2	3
(United States) A Harkleroad (United States) B Mattek	6	6
(United Kingdom) C Curran (South Africa) N Grandin	0	1
4	(Czech Republic) G Navrátilová (Czech Republic) M Paštiková	6	4	6
(Lithuania) L Stančiūtė (Czech Republic) R Voráčová	1	6	3
(France) S Foretz (Italy) An Serra Zanetti	7	6
WC	(Czech Republic) N Fraňková (Czech Republic) K Vaňková	5	4
(Hungary) M Czink (Slovakia) J Husárová	6	6
Q	(Puerto Rico) K Brandi (United States) A Tsoubanos	0	3
(Canada) M Drake (Venezuela) M Sequera	7^{7}	7^{7}
3	(Italy) ME Camerin (China) S Peng	6^{3}	6^{4}
(Poland) A Radwańska (Poland) A Rosolska	2	7	4
(Czech Republic) L Hradecká (Czech Republic) V Uhlířová	6	5	6
(United States) N Uberoi (India) S Uberoi	4	4
2	(France) M Bartoli (Israel) S Pe'er	6	6

Quarterfinals
1	(United States) M Navratilova (Czech Republic) B Strýcová	4	2
(United States) A Harkleroad (United States) B Mattek	6	6
4	(Czech Republic) G Navrátilová (Czech Republic) M Paštiková	6	6
(France) S Foretz (Italy) An Serra Zanetti	2	4
(Hungary) M Czink (Slovakia) J Husárová	6	4	3
(Canada) M Drake (Venezuela) M Sequera	4	6	6
(Czech Republic) L Hradecká (Czech Republic) V Uhlířová	3	4
2	(France) M Bartoli (Israel) S Pe'er	6	6

Semifinals
(United States) A Harkleroad (United States) B Mattek	6	2	7
4	(Czech Republic) G Navrátilová (Czech Republic) M Paštiková	3	6	5
(Canada) M Drake (Venezuela) M Sequera	2	6	4
2	(France) M Bartoli (Israel) S Pe'er	6	0	6

Final
(United States) A Harkleroad (United States) B Mattek	4	4
2	(France) M Bartoli (Israel) S Pe'er	6	6
