= 2007 ECM Prague Open – Men's doubles =

Men's doubles
- 2007 ECM Prague Open

Final
- Champions: (Czech Republic) Tomáš Cibulec (Australia) Jordan Kerr
- Runners-up: (Czech Republic) Leoš Friedl (Czech Republic) David Škoch
- Score: 6–4, 6–2

Events
Singles	men	women
Doubles	men	women
← 2006 ·	ECM Prague Open	· 2008 →

The men's doubles of the 2007 ECM Prague Open tournament was played on clay in Prague, Czech Republic.

Petr Pála and David Škoch were the defending champions, but competed this year with different partners.

Pála teamed up with Pavel Vízner and lost in first round to Lukáš Dlouhý and Tomáš Zíb.

Škoch teamed up with Leoš Friedl and lost in the final 6–4, 6–2 to tournament winners Tomáš Cibulec and Jordan Kerr.

== Seeds ==
1. (Czech Republic) Petr Pála / (Czech Republic) Pavel Vízner (first round)
2. (Czech Republic) Leoš Friedl / (Czech Republic) David Škoch (final)
3. (Switzerland) Yves Allegro / (Australia) Stephen Huss (semifinals)
4. (Czech Republic) Tomáš Cibulec / (Australia) Jordan Kerr (champions)

== Draw ==
Key

- Q = Qualifier
- WC = Wild card
- LL = Lucky loser
- Alt = Alternate
- ITF = ITF entry
- PR = Protected ranking
- SR = Special ranking
- SE = Special exempt
- JE = Junior exempt
- JR = Junior Accelerator Programme entrant
- CO = College Accelerator Programme entrant
- NG = Next Gen Accelerator Program entrant
- w/o = Walkover
- r = Retired
- d = Defaulted

=== Draw ===
First round
1	(Czech Republic) P Pála (Czech Republic) P Vízner	2	7^{7}	[4]
(Czech Republic) L Dlouhý (Czech Republic) T Zíb	6	6^{3}	[10]
(United States) E Butorac (United Kingdom) J Delgado	5	2
(Brazil) R Mello (Brazil) M Melo	7	6
4	(Czech Republic) T Cibulec (Australia) J Kerr	6	7^{8}
WC	(Czech Republic) I Minář (Czech Republic) J Vaněk	2	6^{6}
(Czech Republic) F Čermák (Czech Republic) J Mertl	6	6^{2}	[10]
WC	(Czech Republic) Ladislav Chramosta (Czech Republic) Filip Zeman	3	7^{7}	[3]
(Paraguay) R Delgado (Brazil) A Sá	6	6
(Czech Republic) J Hernych (Czech Republic) R Vik	4	3
WC	(Czech Republic) Dušan Karol (Czech Republic) M Tabara	2	5
3	(Switzerland) Y Allegro (Australia) S Huss	6	7
(Italy) F Cipolla (Argentina) D Hartfield	6	6
(Greece) K Economidis (Argentina) S Roitman	0	1
(Spain) I Navarro Pastor (Spain) F Vicente	0	2
2	(Czech Republic) L Friedl (Czech Republic) D Škoch	6	6

Quarterfinals
(Czech Republic) L Dlouhý (Czech Republic) T Zíb	1	2
(Brazil) R Mello (Brazil) M Melo	6	6
4	(Czech Republic) T Cibulec (Australia) J Kerr	6	7
(Czech Republic) F Čermák (Czech Republic) J Mertl	4	5
(Paraguay) R Delgado (Brazil) A Sá	4	4
3	(Switzerland) Y Allegro (Australia) S Huss	6	6
(Italy) F Cipolla (Argentina) D Hartfield	2	5
2	(Czech Republic) L Friedl (Czech Republic) D Škoch	6	7

Semifinals
(Brazil) R Mello (Brazil) M Melo	6^{3}	2
4	(Czech Republic) T Cibulec (Australia) J Kerr	7^{7}	6
3	(Switzerland) Y Allegro (Australia) S Huss	6^{5}	3
2	(Czech Republic) L Friedl (Czech Republic) D Škoch	7^{7}	6

Final
4	(Czech Republic) T Cibulec (Australia) J Kerr	6	6
2	(Czech Republic) L Friedl (Czech Republic) D Škoch	4	2
