= 2005 ECM Prague Open – Men's doubles =

Men's doubles
- 2005 ECM Prague Open

Final
- Champions: (Australia) Jordan Kerr (Argentina) Sebastián Prieto
- Runners-up: (United States) Travis Parrott (Netherlands) Rogier Wassen
- Score: 6–4, 6–3

Events
Singles	men	women
Doubles	men	women
← 2004 ·	ECM Prague Open	· 2006 →

The men's doubles of the 2005 ECM Prague Open tournament was played on clay in Prague, Czech Republic.

Jordan Kerr and Sebastián Prieto won the title by defeating Travis Parrott and Rogier Wassen 6–4, 6–3 in the final.

== Seeds ==
1. (Australia) Jordan Kerr / (Argentina) Sebastián Prieto (champions)
2. (United States) Travis Parrott / (Netherlands) Rogier Wassen (final)
3. (Czech Republic) Tomáš Cibulec / (Poland) Mariusz Fyrstenberg (first round)
4. (South Africa) Chris Haggard / (Belgium) Tom Vanhoudt (semifinals)

== Draw ==
=== Key ===
- Q = Qualifier
- WC = Wild card
- LL = Lucky loser
- Alt = Alternate
- ITF = ITF entry
- PR = Protected ranking
- SR = Special ranking
- SE = Special exempt
- JE = Junior exempt
- JR = Junior Accelerator Programme entrant
- CO = College Accelerator Programme entrant
- NG = Next Gen Accelerator Program entrant
- w/o = Walkover
- r = Retired
- d = Defaulted

=== Draw ===
First round
1	(Australia) J Kerr (Argentina) S Prieto	6	6
(South Africa) R Koenig (United States) T Phillips	2	4
(Czech Republic) J Hernych (Czech Republic) D Škoch	2	4
(Netherlands) R Sluiter (Netherlands) P Wessels	6	6
4	(South Africa) C Haggard (Belgium) T Vanhoudt	6	6^{4}	6
Q	(Czech Republic) Daniel Lustig (Czech Republic) J Mertl	3	7^{7}	2
(Italy) E Artoni (Ecuador) G Lapentti	7^{7}	6
(Poland) M Matkowski (Czech Republic) J Vaněk	6^{4}	1
WC	(Czech Republic) M Damm (Czech Republic) Filip Zeman	2	1
(Italy) A di Mauro (Czech Republic) P Luxa	6	6
WC	(Czech Republic) L Dlouhý (Czech Republic) I Minář	6	5	6
3	(Czech Republic) T Cibulec (Poland) M Fyrstenberg	1	7	4
WC	(Czech Republic) T Anzari (Czech Republic) Jan Kubeš	1	3
(Czech Republic) M Tabara (Czech Republic) T Zíb	6	6
(France) JF Bachelot (Brazil) F Saretta	2	4
2	(United States) T Parrott (Netherlands) R Wassen	6	6

Quarterfinals
1	(Australia) J Kerr (Argentina) S Prieto	6	7
(Netherlands) R Sluiter (Netherlands) P Wessels	3	5
4	(South Africa) C Haggard (Belgium) T Vanhoudt	6	6
(Italy) E Artoni (Ecuador) G Lapentti	4	3
(Italy) A di Mauro (Czech Republic) P Luxa	1	5
WC	(Czech Republic) L Dlouhý (Czech Republic) I Minář	6	7
(Czech Republic) M Tabara (Czech Republic) T Zíb	2	3
2	(United States) T Parrott (Netherlands) R Wassen	6	6

Semifinals
1	(Australia) J Kerr (Argentina) S Prieto	6	6
4	(South Africa) C Haggard (Belgium) T Vanhoudt	3	4
WC	(Czech Republic) L Dlouhý (Czech Republic) I Minář	5	6^{5}
2	(United States) T Parrott (Netherlands) R Wassen	7	7^{7}

Final
1	(Australia) J Kerr (Argentina) S Prieto	6	6
2	(United States) T Parrott (Netherlands) R Wassen	4	3
