= 2008 ECM Prague Open – Men's singles =

Men's singles
- 2008 ECM Prague Open

Final
- Champion: (Czech Republic) Jan Hernych
- Runner-up: (Czech Republic) Lukáš Dlouhý
- Score: 4–6, 6–2, 6–4

Events
Singles	men	women
Doubles	men	women
← 2007 ·	ECM Prague Open	· 2011 →

The men's singles of the 2008 ECM Prague Open tournament was played on clay in Prague, Czech Republic.

Dušan Lojda was the defending champion, but lost in first round to Augustin Gensse.

Jan Hernych won the title by defeating Lukáš Dlouhý 4–6, 6–2, 6–4 in the final.

== Seeds ==
1. (Czech Republic) Jiří Vaněk (first round)
2. (Argentina) Brian Dabul (quarterfinals)
3. (France) Nicolas Devilder (first round)
4. (Argentina) Leonardo Mayer (second round)
5. (Romania) Adrian Cruciat (first round)
6. (Israel) Harel Levy (semifinals)
7. (Germany) Dominik Meffert (quarterfinals)
8. (Czech Republic) Lukáš Dlouhý (final)

== Draw ==
=== Key ===
- Q = Qualifier
- WC = Wild card
- LL = Lucky loser
- Alt = Alternate
- SE = Special exempt
- PR = Protected ranking
- ITF = ITF entry
- JE = Junior exempt
- w/o = Walkover
- r = Retired
- d = Defaulted
- SR = Special ranking

=== Finals ===
Semifinals
(Czech Republic) Jan Hernych	3	6	6
6	(Israel) Harel Levy	6	4	3
(Czech Republic) Bohdan Ulihrach	3	6	3
8	(Czech Republic) Lukáš Dlouhý	6	4	6

Final
(Czech Republic) Jan Hernych	4	6	6
8	(Czech Republic) Lukáš Dlouhý	6	2	4

=== Top half ===
First round
1	(Czech Republic) J Vaněk	3	4
(Czech Republic) J Hernych	6	6
(Italy) F Piccari	6^{3}	7^{7}	1
(Czech Republic) J Hájek	7^{7}	6^{4}	6
(Czech Republic) T Zíb	6	6
WC	(Czech Republic) D Karol	2	4
(Croatia) I Dodig	7^{7}	2	1
7	(Germany) D Meffert	6^{2}	6	6
3	(France) N Devilder	4	7^{7}	3
(Czech Republic) J Minář	6	6^{5}	6
(Austria) A Haider-Maurer	7^{7}	7^{9}
(Czech Republic) J Vacek	6^{2}	6^{7}
WC	(Czech Republic) R Jebavý	2	3
(Poland) D Olejniczak	6	6
Q	(Germany) G Kretschmer	3	2
6	(Israel) H Levy	6	6

Second round
(Czech Republic) J Hernych	7^{7}	6
(Czech Republic) J Hájek	6^{5}	3
(Czech Republic) T Zíb	1	4
7	(Germany) D Meffert	6	6
(Czech Republic) J Minář	7^{9}	6
(Austria) A Haider-Maurer	6^{7}	2
(Poland) D Olejniczak	4	2
6	(Israel) H Levy	6	6

Quarterfinals
(Czech Republic) J Hernych	6	6
7	(Germany) D Meffert	3	3
(Czech Republic) J Minář	4	5
6	(Israel) H Levy	6	7

Semifinals
(Czech Republic) J Hernych	3	6	6
6	(Israel) H Levy	6	4	3

=== Bottom half ===
First round
5	(Romania) A Cruciat	6	2	6^{3}
(Czech Republic) B Ulihrach	3	6	7^{7}
(France) A Gensse	7^{9}	6
WC	(Czech Republic) D Lojda	6^{7}	2
(Czech Republic) L Rosol	6	6
(Croatia) I Cerović	2	2
Q	(Czech Republic) J Pospíšil	3	1
4	(Argentina) L Mayer	6	6
8	(Czech Republic) L Dlouhý	6	6
(Czech Republic) J Mertl	1	3
(Georgia (country)) I Labadze	1	1^{r}
(Austria) M Slanar	6	3
Q	(Hungary) K Bardóczky	2	2
Q	(Slovakia) K Čapkovič	6	6
WC	(Czech Republic) J Kosler	2	2
2	(Argentina) B Dabul	6	6

Second round
(Czech Republic) B Ulihrach	6	6^{5}	6
(France) A Gensse	3	7^{7}	0
(Czech Republic) L Rosol	6	6
4	(Argentina) L Mayer	3	3
8	(Czech Republic) L Dlouhý	7	6
(Austria) M Slanar	5	3
Q	(Slovakia) K Čapkovič	3	2
2	(Argentina) B Dabul	6	6

Quarterfinals
(Czech Republic) B Ulihrach	6	2	6
(Czech Republic) L Rosol	4	6	4
8	(Czech Republic) L Dlouhý	7	3	6
2	(Argentina) B Dabul	5	6	1

Semifinals
(Czech Republic) B Ulihrach	3	6	3
8	(Czech Republic) L Dlouhý	6	4	6
