= 2007 ECM Prague Open – Men's singles =

Men's singles
- 2007 ECM Prague Open

Final
- Champion: (Czech Republic) Dušan Lojda
- Runner-up: (Czech Republic) Jiří Vaněk
- Score: 6–7^{(3–7)}, 6–2, 7–6^{(7–5)}

Events
Singles	men	women
Doubles	men	women
← 2006 ·	ECM Prague Open	· 2008 →

The men's singles of the 2007 ECM Prague Open tournament was played on clay in Prague, Czech Republic.

Robin Vik was the defending champion, but lost in first round to Jan Hájek.

Dušan Lojda won the title by defeating Jiří Vaněk 6–7^{(3–7)}, 6–2, 7–6^{(7–5)} in the final.

== Seeds ==
1. (Argentina) Sergio Roitman (quarterfinals)
2. (Argentina) Diego Hartfield (semifinals)
3. (Czech Republic) Jan Hájek (second round, retired due to a left knee injury)
4. (Czech Republic) Jan Hernych (first round)
5. (Thailand) Danai Udomchoke (second round)
6. (Czech Republic) Lukáš Dlouhý (first round)
7. (Spain) Iván Navarro Pastor (semifinals)
8. (United Kingdom) Alex Bogdanovic (first round)

== Draw ==
=== Key ===
- Q = Qualifier
- WC = Wild card
- LL = Lucky loser
- Alt = Alternate
- ITF = ITF entry
- PR = Protected ranking
- SR = Special ranking
- SE = Special exempt
- JE = Junior exempt
- JR = Junior Accelerator Programme entrant
- CO = College Accelerator Programme entrant
- NG = Next Gen Accelerator Program entrant
- w/o = Walkover
- r = Retired
- d = Defaulted

=== Finals ===
Semifinals
7	(Spain) Iván Navarro Pastor	6^{1}	2
(Czech Republic) Jiří Vaněk	7^{7}	6
WC	(Czech Republic) Dušan Lojda	6	5	6
2	(Argentina) Diego Hartfield	4	7	4

Final
(Czech Republic) Jiří Vaněk	7^{7}	2	6^{5}
WC	(Czech Republic) Dušan Lojda	6^{3}	6	7^{7}

=== Top half ===
First round
1	(Argentina) S Roitman	6	2
SE	(Czech Republic) B Ulihrach	4	1^{r}
(Czech Republic) I Minář	6	7^{7}
(Spain) F Vicente	1	6^{2}
WC	(Czech Republic) Dušan Karol	1	3
Q	(France) M Montcourt	6	6
(Switzerland) G Bastl	6^{7}	6	6^{5}
7	(Spain) I Navarro Pastor	7^{9}	3	7^{7}
4	(Czech Republic) J Hernych	6	6^{7}	6^{4}
(Czech Republic) J Vaněk	2	7^{9}	7^{7}
(Netherlands) R Sluiter	6	7^{10}
(Poland) Ł Kubot	4	6^{8}
Q	(Latvia) A Juška	4	7	6
(Brazil) A Sá	6	5	1
(Paraguay) R Delgado	2	6	3
5	(Thailand) D Udomchoke	6	3	6

Second round
1	(Argentina) S Roitman	6	5	7^{7}
(Czech Republic) I Minář	4	7	6^{4}
Q	(France) M Montcourt	3	6^{5}
7	(Spain) I Navarro Pastor	6	7^{7}
(Czech Republic) J Vaněk	7^{7}	7
(Netherlands) R Sluiter	6^{4}	5
Q	(Latvia) A Juška	6	6^{6}	6
5	(Thailand) D Udomchoke	1	7^{8}	4

Quarterfinals
1	(Argentina) S Roitman	6	6^{4}	3
7	(Spain) I Navarro Pastor	4	7^{7}	6
(Czech Republic) J Vaněk	6	6
Q	(Latvia) A Juška	4	4

Semifinals
7	(Spain) I Navarro Pastor	6^{1}	2
(Czech Republic) J Vaněk	7^{7}	6

=== Bottom half ===
First round
6	(Czech Republic) L Dlouhý	4	6	6^{5}
WC	(Czech Republic) D Lojda	6	3	7^{7}
Q	(Netherlands) P Wessels	6	3	7^{7}
(Netherlands) R Haase	1	6	6^{1}
(Austria) O Marach	6	6
WC	(Slovakia) Martin Durdik	1	0
(Czech Republic) R Vik	4	3
3	(Czech Republic) J Hájek	6	6
8	(United Kingdom) A Bogdanovic	5	6	3
(Czech Republic) J Mertl	7	4	6
Q	(Finland) T Nieminen	4	5
(Greece) K Economidis	6	7
(Czech Republic) T Zíb	6	5	6^{2}
WC	(Spain) F Mantilla	4	7	7^{7}
(Brazil) R Mello	4	6	0
2	(Argentina) D Hartfield	6	4	6

Second round
WC	(Czech Republic) D Lojda	3	6	6
Q	(Netherlands) P Wessels	6	4	3
(Austria) O Marach	6	3
3	(Czech Republic) J Hájek	4	2^{r}
(Czech Republic) J Mertl	2	2
(Greece) K Economidis	6	6
WC	(Spain) F Mantilla	4	2
2	(Argentina) D Hartfield	6	6

Quarterfinals
WC	(Czech Republic) D Lojda	6	6
(Austria) O Marach	4	3
(Greece) K Economidis	7	1	1
2	(Argentina) D Hartfield	5	6	6

Semifinals
WC	(Czech Republic) D Lojda	6	5	6
2	(Argentina) D Hartfield	4	7	4
