= 2006 ECM Prague Open – Women's singles =

Women's singles
- 2006 ECM Prague Open

Final
- Champion: (Israel) Shahar Pe'er
- Runner-up: (Australia) Samantha Stosur
- Score: 4–6, 6–2, 6–1

Events
Singles	men	women
Doubles	men	women
← 2005 ·	ECM Prague Open	· 2007 →

The women's singles of the 2006 ECM Prague Open tournament was played on clay in Prague, Czech Republic.

Dinara Safina was the defending champion, but competed in Berlin at the same week.

Shahar Pe'er won the title by defeating Samantha Stosur 4–6, 6–2, 6–1 in the final.

== Seeds ==
1. (France) Marion Bartoli (first round)
2. (Czech Republic) Lucie Šafářová (first round)
3. (Israel) Shahar Pe'er (champion)
4. (France) Émilie Loit (quarterfinals)
5. (Australia) Samantha Stosur (final)
6. (Italy) Maria Elena Camerin (quarterfinals)
7. (China) Peng Shuai (semifinals)
8. (Ukraine) Alona Bondarenko (quarterfinals)

== Draw ==
=== Key ===
- Q = Qualifier
- WC = Wild card
- LL = Lucky loser
- Alt = Alternate
- ITF = ITF entry
- PR = Protected ranking
- SR = Special ranking
- SE = Special exempt
- JE = Junior exempt
- JR = Junior Accelerator Programme entrant
- CO = College Accelerator Programme entrant
- NG = Next Gen Accelerator Program entrant
- w/o = Walkover
- r = Retired
- d = Defaulted

=== Finals ===
Semifinals
(Estonia) Kaia Kanepi	3	0
3	(Israel) Shahar Pe'er	6	6
5	(Australia) Samantha Stosur	6	6
7	(China) Peng Shuai	1	3

Final
3	(Israel) Shahar Pe'er	4	6	6
5	(Australia) Samantha Stosur	6	2	1

=== Top half ===
First round
1	(France) M Bartoli	7^{7}	3	2
(Estonia) K Kanepi	6^{5}	6	6
(France) S Foretz	6	6
(Switzerland) E Gagliardi	3	3
(Ukraine) V Kutuzova	2	2
(United States) M Shaughnessy	6	6
(Ukraine) O Savchuk	4	1
6	(Italy) ME Camerin	6	6
3	(Israel) S Pe'er	6	6
WC	(Czech Republic) N Fraňková	3	1
(Czech Republic) Z Ondrášková	4	7^{8}	6
(Argentina) M Díaz Oliva	6	6^{6}	3
(Hungary) M Czink	1	6	6
(Italy) An Serra Zanetti	6	2	2
(Slovakia) M Suchá	6^{1}	2
8	(Ukraine) A Bondarenko	7^{7}	6

Second round
(Estonia) K Kanepi	7	1	7^{10}
(France) S Foretz	5	6	6^{8}
(United States) M Shaughnessy	5	4
6	(Italy) ME Camerin	7	6
3	(Israel) S Pe'er	7^{8}	0	6
(Czech Republic) Z Ondrášková	6^{6}	6	3
(Hungary) M Czink	6	0	2
8	(Ukraine) A Bondarenko	2	6	6

Quarterfinals
(Estonia) K Kanepi	7	0	7
6	(Italy) ME Camerin	5	6	5
3	(Israel) S Pe'er	7	6
8	(Ukraine) A Bondarenko	5	0

Semifinals
(Estonia) K Kanepi	3	0
3	(Israel) S Pe'er	6	6

=== Bottom half ===
First round
5	(Australia) S Stosur	6	6
Q	(South Africa) N Grandin	2	2
(Japan) A Morigami	6	6
WC	(Czech Republic) B Strýcová	3	1
(United States) A Harkleroad	6	4	3
(Croatia) K Šprem	0	6	6
Q	(Poland) A Radwańska	2	4
4	(France) É Loit	6	6
7	(China) S Peng	6	6
(United States) B Mattek	2	3
Q	(Czech Republic) M Paštiková	6	7
Q	(Belarus) V Azarenka	2	5
(Venezuela) M Sequera	4	6	7
(Puerto Rico) K Brandi	6	4	5
WC	(Slovakia) M Rybáriková	6^{3}	6	6
2	(Czech Republic) L Šafářová	7^{7}	4	4

Second round
5	(Australia) S Stosur	6	6
(Japan) A Morigami	1	2
(Croatia) K Šprem	4	3
4	(France) É Loit	6	6
7	(China) S Peng	6	6
Q	(Czech Republic) M Paštiková	2	4
(Venezuela) M Sequera	6^{3}	0
WC	(Slovakia) M Rybáriková	7^{7}	6

Quarterfinals
5	(Australia) S Stosur	6	6
4	(France) É Loit	4	3
7	(China) S Peng	7	6
WC	(Slovakia) M Rybáriková	5	4

Semifinals
5	(Australia) S Stosur	6	6
7	(China) S Peng	1	3
