= 2007 ECM Prague Open – Women's singles =

Women's singles
- 2007 ECM Prague Open

Final
- Champion: (Japan) Akiko Morigami
- Runner-up: (France) Marion Bartoli
- Score: 6–1, 6–3

Events
Singles	men	women
Doubles	men	women
← 2006 ·	ECM Prague Open	· 2008 →

The women's singles tournament at the 2007 ECM Prague Open took place between 7 and 13 May on clay courts in Prague, Czech Republic. Akiko Morigami won the title, defeating Marion Bartoli in the final.

== Seeds ==
1. (France) Marion Bartoli (final)
2. (Argentina) Gisela Dulko (first round)
3. (Russia) Olga Poutchkova (second round)
4. (Netherlands) Michaëlla Krajicek (first round)
5. (France) Nathalie Dechy (second round)
6. (Japan) Akiko Morigami (champion)
7. (France) Virginie Razzano (second round)
8. (Russia) Anastasia Rodionova (first round)

== Draw ==
=== Key ===
- Q = Qualifier
- WC = Wild card
- LL = Lucky loser
- Alt = Alternate
- SE = Special exempt
- PR = Protected ranking
- ITF = ITF entry
- JE = Junior exempt
- w/o = Walkover
- r = Retired
- d = Defaulted
- SR = Special ranking

=== Finals ===
Semifinals
1	(France) Marion Bartoli	6	6
Q	(Czech Republic) Klára Zakopalová	3	2
6	(Japan) Akiko Morigami	6	4
(Belarus) Victoria Azarenka	3	5^{r}

Finals
1	(France) Marion Bartoli	1	3
6	(Japan) Akiko Morigami	6	6

=== Top half ===
First round
1	(France) M Bartoli	6	6
WC	(Czech Republic) Kr Plíšková	1	2
(Ukraine) V Kutuzova	6	7
(Italy) A Brianti	5	3
(Germany) S Klösel	7	6
(Thailand) T Tanasugarn	5	0
(Slovakia) J Gajdošová	6	6
8	(Russia) A Rodionova	1	0
3	(Russia) O Poutchkova	7	7
WC	(Czech Republic) Ka Plíšková	6^{2}	5
(Bulgaria) T Pironkova	4	6^{3}
(Germany) J Schruff	6	7
Q	(Czech Republic) B Záhlavová-Strýcová	2	5
Q	(Czech Republic) K Zakopalová	6	7
(China) T Sun	0	5
7	(France) V Razzano	6	7

Second round
1	(France) M Bartoli	6	6
(Ukraine) V Kutuzova	3	4
(Germany) S Klösel	0	4
(Slovakia) J Gajdošová	6	6
3	(Russia) O Poutchkova	2	2
(Germany) J Schruff	6	6
Q	(Czech Republic) K Zakopalová	6	7
7	(France) V Razzano	2	6^{1}

Quarterfinals
1	(France) M Bartoli	6	6
Q	(Slovakia) J Gajdošová	1	4
(Germany) J Schruff	3	1
Q	(Czech Republic) K Zakopalová	6	6

Semifinals
1	(France) M Bartoli	6	6
Q	(Czech Republic) K Zakopalová	3	2

=== Bottom half ===
First round
6	(Japan) A Morigami	6	6
WC	(Czech Republic) I Benešová	3	2
(United States) J Ditty	2	4
(Venezuela) M Sequera	6	6
(France) C Pin	6	6
(Colombia) C Castaño	4	1
(Austria) Y Meusburger	3	6	7
4	(Netherlands) M Krajicek	6	4	5
5	(France) N Dechy	7	6
LL	(Czech Republic) R Voráčová	5	0
(Slovakia) M Suchá	6	3	2
(Belarus) V Azarenka	2	6	6
Q	(Czech Republic) A Hlaváčková	1	7	6
(United States) J Craybas	6	5	2
Q	(Slovakia) D Cibulková	6	7
2	(Argentina) G Dulko	3	6^{5}

Second round
6	(Japan) A Morigami	6	6
(Venezuela) M Sequera	1	3
(France) C Pin	1	6	7
(Austria) Y Meusburger	6	2	5
5	(France) N Dechy	6^{3}	1
(Belarus) V Azarenka	7	6
Q	(Czech Republic) A Hlaváčková	1	3
Q	(Slovakia) D Cibulková	6	6

Quarterfinals
6	(Japan) A Morigami	6	6
(France) C Pin	3	1
(Belarus) V Azarenka	6	6
Q	(Slovakia) D Cibulková	1	1

Semifinals
6	(Japan) A Morigami	6	4
(Belarus) V Azarenka	3	5^{r}
