= 2006 ECM Prague Open =

- Date: 8–14 May
- Edition: 15th (ATP) / 5th (WTA)
- Category: Challenger (ATP); Tier IV (WTA)
- Prize money: US$100,000 (ATP); US$145,000 (WTA)
- Surface: Clay, outdoor
- Location: Prague, Czech Republic
- Venue: I. Czech Lawn Tennis Club

Champions

Men's singles
- (Czech Republic) Robin Vik

Women's singles
- (Israel) Shahar Pe'er

Men's doubles
- (Czech Republic) Petr Pála / (Czech Republic) David Škoch

Women's doubles
- (France) Marion Bartoli / (Israel) Shahar Pe'er
- ECM Prague Open

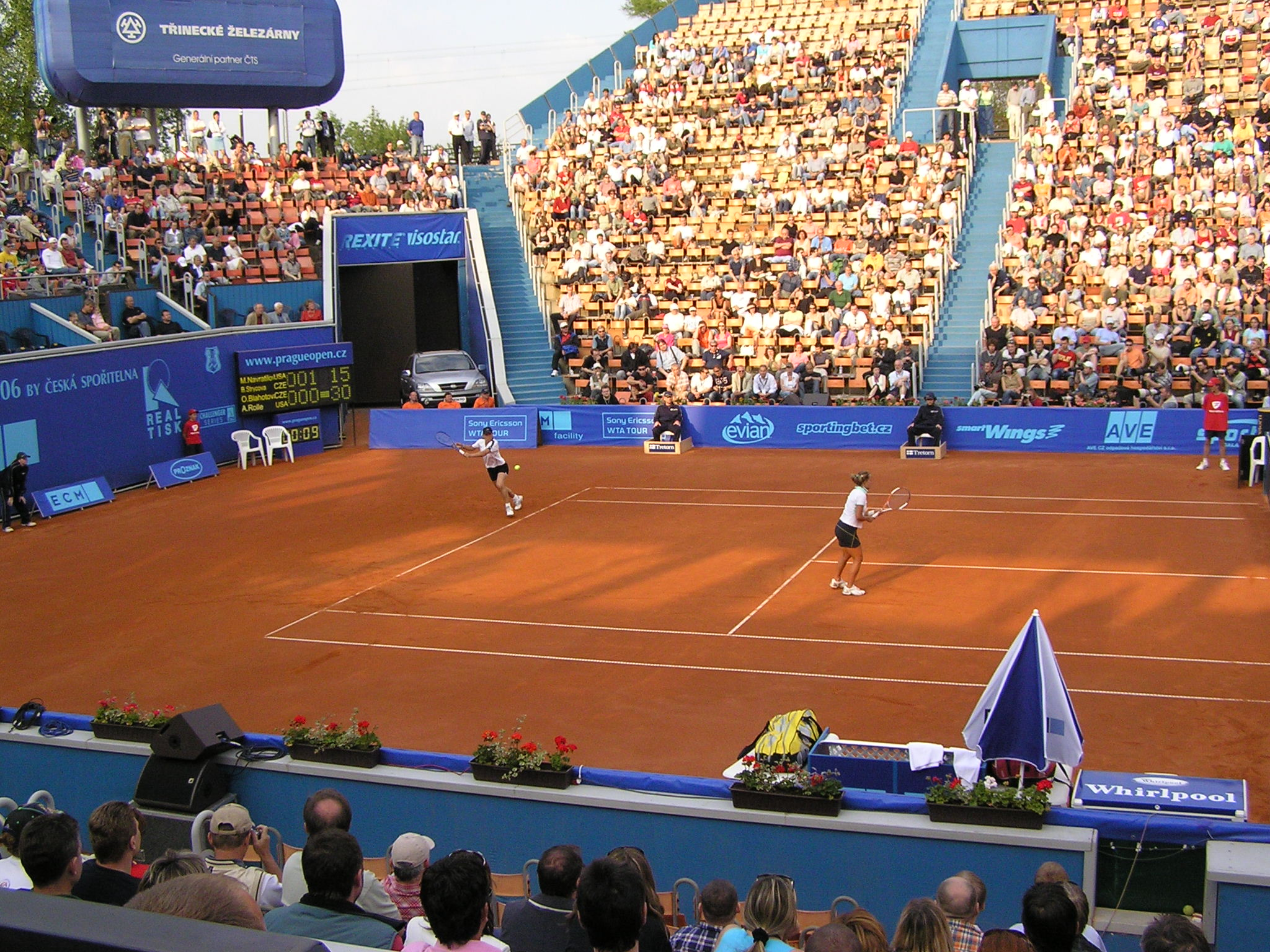
ECM Prague Open 2006

The 2006 ECM Prague Open, known also as 2006 ECM Prague Open by Ceska Sporitelna for sponsorship reasons, was a professional tennis tournament played on clay courts at the I. Czech Lawn Tennis Club in Prague, Czech Republic from 8 to 14 May 2006. It was the 15th edition of the men's tournament which was part of the 2006 ATP Challenger Series and the 5th edition of the women's tournament which was part of the 2006 WTA Tour as a Tier IV tournament.

== Points and prize money ==
Note: this information was only available for the women's tournament

=== Point distribution ===
Event	W	F	SF	QF	Round of 16	Round of 32	Q	Q3	Q2	Q1
Women's singles	95	67	43	24	12	1	5.5	3.5	2	1
Women's doubles	95	67	43	24	1	—N/a	6.25	—N/a	—N/a	—N/a

=== Prize money ===
Event	W	F	SF	QF	Round of 16	Round of 32	Q3	Q2	Q1
Women's singles	$22,900	$12,345	$6,650	$3,580	$1,925	$1,035	$555	$300	$175
Women's doubles *	$6,750	$3,640	$1,960	$1,050	$565	—N/a	—N/a	—N/a	—N/a

_{* per team}

== Men's singles entrants ==
=== Seeds ===
Country	Player	Rank^{1}	Seed
CZE	Robin Vik	74	1
CZE	Jan Hernych	80	2
CZE	Lukáš Dlouhý	86	3
ARG	Carlos Berlocq	82	4
FRA	Julien Benneteau	95	5
CZE	Jiří Vaněk	85	6
ESP	Albert Montañés	99	7
PAR	Ramón Delgado	107	8

^{1} Source: ATP

=== Other entrants ===
The following players received wildcards into the singles main draw:

- (Czech Republic) Dušan Karol
- (Czech Republic) Michal Navrátil
- (Austria) Wolfgang Schranz
- (Germany) Mike Steinherr

The following players received entry from the qualifying draw:

- (Greece) Konstantinos Economidis
- (Czech Republic) Jan Hájek
- (Czech Republic) Petr Kralert
- (Italy) Simone Vagnozzi

The following players received entry as special exempts:

- (Spain) Marcel Granollers-Pujol (reached the final at Ostrava last week)
- (Algeria) Lamine Ouahab (won in Tunis last week)

== Men's doubles entrants ==
=== Seeds ===
Country	Player	Country	Player	Seed
CZE	Lukáš Dlouhý	CZE	Pavel Vízner	1
CZE	Petr Pála	CZE	David Škoch	2
AUS	Ashley Fisher	AUS	Jordan Kerr	3
RSA	Jeff Coetzee	NED	Rogier Wassen	4

=== Other entrants ===
The following pairs received wildcards into the doubles main draw:

- (Czech Republic) Martin Damm / (Czech Republic) Dušan Karol
- (Czech Republic) Jan Hájek / (Czech Republic) Dušan Lojda
- (Czech Republic) Miloslav Navrátil / (Czech Republic) Filip Zeman

The following pair received entry from the qualifying draw:

- (Romania) Florin Mergea / (Romania) Andrei Pavel

== Women's singles entrants ==
=== Seeds ===
Country	Player	Rank^{1}	Seed
FRA	Marion Bartoli	27	1
CZE	Lucie Šafářová	31	2
ISR	Shahar Pe'er	36	3
FRA	Émilie Loit	50	4
AUS	Samantha Stosur	55	5
ITA	Maria Elena Camerin	59	6
CHN	Peng Shuai	64	7
UKR	Alona Bondarenko	69	8

^{1} Rankings as of 1 May 2006.

=== Other entrants ===
The following players received wildcards into the singles main draw:

- (Czech Republic) Nikola Fraňková
- (Slovakia) Magdaléna Rybáriková
- (Czech Republic) Barbora Strýcová

The following players received entry from the qualifying draw:

- (Belarus) Victoria Azarenka
- (South Africa) Natalie Grandin
- (Czech Republic) Michaela Paštiková
- (Poland) Agnieszka Radwańska

== Women's doubles entrants ==
=== Seeds ===
Country	Player	Country	Player	Rank^{1}	Seed
USA	Martina Navratilova	CZE	Barbora Strýcová	65	1
FRA	Marion Bartoli	ISR	Shahar Pe'er	108	2
ITA	Maria Elena Camerin	CHN	Peng Shuai	110	3
CZE	Gabriela Navrátilová	CZE	Michaela Paštiková	141	4

^{1} Rankings as of 1 May 2006.

=== Other entrants ===
The following pair received a wildcard into the doubles main draw:

- (Czech Republic) Nikola Fraňková / (Czech Republic) Kateřina Vaňková

The following pair received entry from the qualifying draw:

- (Puerto Rico) Kristina Brandi / (United States) Aleke Tsoubanos

== Finals ==
=== Men's singles ===
- (Czech Republic) Robin Vik defeated (Czech Republic) Jan Hajek, 6–4, 7–6^{(7–4)}

=== Men's doubles ===
- (Czech Republic) Petr Pála / (Czech Republic) David Škoch defeated (Paraguay) Ramón Delgado / (Argentina) Sergio Roitman, 6–0, 6–0

=== Women's singles ===
- (Israel) Shahar Pe'er defeated (Australia) Samantha Stosur, 4–6, 6–2, 6–1

It was the 2nd singles title for Pe'er in the season and her career.

=== Women's doubles ===
- (France) Marion Bartoli / (Israel) Shahar Pe'er defeated (United States) Ashley Harkleroad / (United States) Bethanie Mattek, 6–4, 6–4

It was the 3rd title for Bartoli and the 1st title for Pe'er in their respective doubles careers.
