= 2008 ECM Prague Open – Women's doubles =

Women's doubles
- 2008 ECM Prague Open

Final
- Champions: (Czech Republic) Andrea Hlaváčková (Czech Republic) Lucie Hradecká
- Runners-up: (United States) Jill Craybas (Netherlands) Michaëlla Krajicek
- Score: 1–6, 6–3, 10–6

Details
- Draw: 16
- Seeds: 4

Events
Singles	men	women
Doubles	men	women
← 2007 ·	ECM Prague Open	· 2009 →

The women's doubles of the 2008 ECM Prague Open tournament was played on clay in Prague, Czech Republic.

Petra Cetkovská and Andrea Hlaváčková were the defending champions, but Cetkovská chose not to participate, and only Hlaváčková competed that year.
Hlaváčková partnered with Lucie Hradecká, and won in the final 1–6, 6–3, 10–6, against Jill Craybas and Michaëlla Krajicek.

== Seeds ==
1. (Czech Republic) Iveta Benešová / (Slovakia) Janette Husárová (first round)
2. (Russia) Vera Dushevina / (United States) Meghann Shaughnessy (first round)
3. (Germany) Martina Müller / (Czech Republic) Gabriela Navrátilová (first round)
4. (United States) Jill Craybas / (Netherlands) Michaëlla Krajicek (final)

== Draw ==
=== Key ===
- Q = Qualifier
- WC = Wild card
- LL = Lucky loser
- Alt = Alternate
- SE = Special exempt
- PR = Protected ranking
- ITF = ITF entry
- JE = Junior exempt
- w/o = Walkover
- r = Retired
- d = Defaulted
- SR = Special ranking

=== Draw ===
First round
1	(Czech Republic) I Benešová (Slovakia) J Husárová	6^{3}	7	[5]
(China) C Ji (China) S Sun	7	6^{5}	[10]
(Latvia) L Dekmeijere (Belarus) E Dzehalevich	4	6	[10]
(Uzbekistan) A Amanmuradova (Germany) J Wöhr	6	3	[6]
4	(United States) J Craybas (Netherlands) M Krajicek	3	6	[10]
(Ukraine) V Kapshay (Poland) U Radwańska	6	3	[4]
(Czech Republic) E Hrdinová (Poland) K Jans	6	6
WC	(Czech Republic) Ka Plíšková (Czech Republic) Kr Plíšková	0	3
(Russia) E Ivanova (Belarus) T Poutchek	5	3
(Bosnia and Herzegovina) M Jugić-Salkić (Turkey) İ Şenoğlu	7	6
(Czech Republic) A Hlaváčková (Czech Republic) L Hradecká	6	5	[10]
3	(Germany) M Müller (Czech Republic) G Navrátilová	3	7	[4]
(Australia) A Molik (Australia) B Stewart	4	0
(Belarus) D Kustova (Poland) A Rosolska	6	6
(Hungary) M Czink (South Africa) N Grandin	6	2	[10]
2	(Russia) V Dushevina (United States) M Shaughnessy	4	6	[8]

Quarterfinals
(China) C Ji (China) S Sun	2	7	[1]
(Latvia) L Dekmeijere (Belarus) E Dzehalevich	6	5	[10]
4	(United States) J Craybas (Netherlands) M Krajicek	2	6	[11]
(Czech Republic) E Hrdinová (Poland) K Jans	6	4	[9]
(Bosnia and Herzegovina) M Jugić-Salkić (Turkey) İ Şenoğlu	3	3
(Czech Republic) A Hlaváčková (Czech Republic) L Hradecká	6	6
(Belarus) D Kustova (Poland) A Rosolska	6	6
(Hungary) M Czink (South Africa) N Grandin	4	4

Semifinals
(Latvia) L Dekmeijere (Belarus) E Dzehalevich	6	5	[12]
4	(United States) J Craybas (Netherlands) M Krajicek	3	7	[14]
(Czech Republic) A Hlaváčková (Czech Republic) L Hradecká	6	7
(Belarus) D Kustova (Poland) A Rosolska	1	6^{6}

Final
4	(United States) J Craybas (Netherlands) M Krajicek	6	3	[6]
(Czech Republic) A Hlaváčková (Czech Republic) L Hradecká	1	6	[10]
