= 2005 ECM Prague Open – Men's singles =

Men's singles
- 2005 ECM Prague Open

Final
- Champion: (Czech Republic) Jan Hernych
- Runner-up: (Czech Republic) Jiří Vaněk
- Score: 3–6, 6–4, 6–3

Details
- Draw: 32 (4WC/4Q/1LL/2SE/2PR)
- Seeds: 8

Events
Singles	men	women
Doubles	men	women
← 2004 ·	ECM Prague Open	· 2006 →

The men's singles of the 2005 ECM Prague Open tournament was played on clay in Prague, Czech Republic.

Jan Hernych successfully defended his title, by defeating Jiří Vaněk 3–6, 6–4, 6–3 in the final.

== Seeds ==
1. (Czech Republic) Tomáš Zíb (second round)
2. (Czech Republic) Jan Hernych (champion)
3. (Netherlands) Peter Wessels (first round)
4. (France) Gaël Monfils (quarterfinals)
5. (Netherlands) Raemon Sluiter (first round)
6. (Cyprus) Marcos Baghdatis (first round)
7. (Czech Republic) Jiří Vaněk (final)
8. (Czech Republic) Michal Tabara (second round)

== Draw ==
=== Key ===
- Q = Qualifier
- WC = Wild card
- LL = Lucky loser
- Alt = Alternate
- ITF = ITF entry
- PR = Protected ranking
- SR = Special ranking
- SE = Special exempt
- JE = Junior exempt
- JR = Junior Accelerator Programme entrant
- CO = College Accelerator Programme entrant
- NG = Next Gen Accelerator Program entrant
- w/o = Walkover
- r = Retired
- d = Defaulted

=== Finals ===
Semifinals
7	(Czech Republic) Jiří Vaněk	6^{3}	6	6
(Brazil) Flávio Saretta	7^{7}	1	4
(Belgium) Kristof Vliegen	6^{1}	0
2	(Czech Republic) Jan Hernych	7^{7}	6

Final
7	(Czech Republic) Jiří Vaněk	6	4	3
2	(Czech Republic) Jan Hernych	3	6	6

=== Top half ===
First round
1	(Czech Republic) T Zíb	6	6
SE	(Czech Republic) L Dlouhý	1	4
Q	(Czech Republic) R Vik	4	6	6
Q	(Czech Republic) J Mertl	6	2	3
SE	(France) N Devilder	6	7
PR	(Australia) S Draper	3	5
(Italy) A di Mauro	3	5
7	(Czech Republic) J Vaněk	6	7
3	(Netherlands) P Wessels	5	2
WC	(Czech Republic) D Lojda	7	6
(France) A Dupuis	1	4
(Czech Republic) I Minář	6	6
WC	(Czech Republic) Filip Zeman	0	5
(Brazil) F Saretta	6	7
PR	(Colombia) A Falla	2	6	5
8	(Czech Republic) M Tabara	6	3	7

Second round
1	(Czech Republic) T Zíb	2	5
Q	(Czech Republic) R Vik	6	7
SE	(France) N Devilder	3	3
7	(Czech Republic) J Vaněk	6	6
WC	(Czech Republic) D Lojda	6^{6}	1
(Czech Republic) I Minář	7^{8}	6
(Brazil) F Saretta	6	2	6
8	(Czech Republic) M Tabara	4	6	2

Quarterfinals
Q	(Czech Republic) R Vik	6^{5}	6^{8}
7	(Czech Republic) J Vaněk	7^{7}	7^{10}
(Czech Republic) I Minář	3	6	4
(Brazil) F Saretta	6	3	6

Semifinals
7	(Czech Republic) J Vaněk	6^{3}	6	6
(Brazil) F Saretta	7^{7}	1	4

=== Bottom half ===
First round
6	(Cyprus) M Baghdatis	1	2
(Belgium) D Norman	6	6
WC	(Czech Republic) Adam Vejmělka	3	2
(Belgium) K Vliegen	6	6
(France) N Mahut	3	7	2
LL	(France) F Serra	6	5	6
WC	(Czech Republic) Jiří Košler	1	0
4	(France) G Monfils	6	6
5	(Netherlands) R Sluiter	4	7^{7}	3
(Ecuador) G Lapentti	6	6^{5}	6
(Australia) P Luczak	5	4
(France) J Benneteau	7	6
(Finland) J Nieminen	6	3	4
Q	(Spain) G Blanco	2	6	6
Q	(Spain) A Portas	6	3	4
2	(Czech Republic) J Hernych	4	6	6

Second round
(Belgium) D Norman	3	3
(Belgium) K Vliegen	6	6
LL	(France) F Serra	7^{7}	4	5
4	(France) G Monfils	6^{3}	6	7
(Ecuador) G Lapentti	2	7	6
(France) J Benneteau	6	5	4
Q	(Spain) G Blanco	1	0
2	(Czech Republic) J Hernych	6	6

Quarterfinals
(Belgium) K Vliegen	6	6
4	(France) G Monfils	2	1
(Ecuador) G Lapentti	2	3
2	(Czech Republic) J Hernych	6	6

Semifinals
(Belgium) K Vliegen	6^{1}	0
2	(Czech Republic) J Hernych	7^{7}	6
