= 2008 ECM Prague Open – Women's singles =

Women's Singles

Women's singles
- 2008 ECM Prague Open

Final
- Champion: (Russia) Vera Zvonareva
- Runner-up: (Belarus) Victoria Azarenka
- Score: 7–6(2), 6–2

Events
Singles	men	women
Doubles	men	women
← 2007 ·	ECM Prague Open	· 2009 →

The women's singles of the 2008 ECM Prague Open tournament was played on clay in Prague, Czech Republic.

Akiko Morigami was the defending champion, but chose not to participate that year.

Vera Zvonareva won in the final 7–6(2), 6–2, against Victoria Azarenka.

== Seeds ==
1. (Russia) Vera Zvonareva (champion)
2. (Israel) Shahar Pe'er (quarterfinals)
3. (Belarus) Victoria Azarenka (final)
4. (Slovenia) Katarina Srebotnik (semifinals)
5. (Italy) Karin Knapp (first round)
6. (Netherlands) Michaëlla Krajicek (first round)
7. (Czech Republic) Klára Zakopalová (semifinals)
8. (Estonia) Kaia Kanepi (second round)

== Draw ==
=== Key ===
- Q = Qualifier
- WC = Wild card
- LL = Lucky loser
- Alt = Alternate
- SE = Special exempt
- PR = Protected ranking
- ITF = ITF entry
- JE = Junior exempt
- w/o = Walkover
- r = Retired
- d = Defaulted
- SR = Special ranking

=== Finals ===
Semifinals
1	(Russia) Vera Zvonareva	6	6
4	(Slovenia) Katarina Srebotnik	2	4
3	(Belarus) Victoria Azarenka	6	6
7	(Czech Republic) Klára Zakopalová	3	2

Final
1	(Russia) Vera Zvonareva	7	6
3	(Belarus) Victoria Azarenka	6^{2}	2

=== Top half ===
First round
1	(Russia) V Zvonareva	6	6
LL	(Czech Republic) L Hradecká	2	3
(United States) M Shaughnessy	1	3
WC	(Slovakia) M Rybáriková	6	6
(Italy) R Vinci	6	6
WC	(Czech Republic) Kr Plíšková	2	0
(United States) J Craybas	6	6
5	(Italy) K Knapp	4	2
4	(Slovenia) K Srebotnik	6	6
(Austria) Y Meusburger	0	0
Q	(Croatia) J Pandžić	0	2
Q	(Hungary) M Czink	6	6
(Sweden) S Arvidsson	3	7	2
(Czech Republic) I Benešová	6	5	6
(Uzbekistan) A Amanmuradova	6	6
6	(Netherlands) M Krajicek	4	3

Second round
1	(Russia) V Zvonareva	w/o
WC	(Slovakia) M Rybáriková
(Italy) R Vinci	6	6
(United States) J Craybas	4	4
4	(Slovenia) K Srebotnik	6	6
Q	(Hungary) M Czink	0	2
(Czech Republic) I Benešová	6	4	6
(Uzbekistan) A Amanmuradova	2	6	3

Quarterfinals
1	(Russia) V Zvonareva	6	6
(Italy) R Vinci	1	2
4	(Slovenia) K Srebotnik	7	4	6
(Czech Republic) I Benešová	5	6	2

Semifinals
1	(Russia) V Zvonareva	6	6
4	(Slovenia) K Srebotnik	2	4

=== Bottom half ===
First round
8	(Estonia) K Kanepi	7	6
(Croatia) K Šprem	5	0
WC	(Czech Republic) Ka Plíšková	6	6
Q	(Australia) A Molik	4	4
(Belarus) E Dzehalevich	1	6	5
(Belarus) T Poutchek	6	4	7
(Czech Republic) P Kvitová	3	4
3	(Belarus) V Azarenka	6	6
7	(Czech Republic) K Zakopalová	6	6
(Italy) S Errani	1	3
(Russia) V Dushevina	6	6
(Germany) M Müller	0	2
Q	(Russia) E Ivanova	1	6^{5}
(Bulgaria) T Pironkova	6	7
(Russia) A Lapushchenkova	5	5
2	(Israel) S Pe'er	7	7

Second round
8	(Estonia) K Kanepi	6	3	5
WC	(Czech Republic) Ka Plíšková	1	6	7
(Belarus) T Poutchek	2	2
3	(Belarus) V Azarenka	6	6
7	(Czech Republic) K Zakopalová	6	1	6
(Russia) V Dushevina	4	6	3
(Bulgaria) T Pironkova	5	2
2	(Israel) S Pe'er	7	6

Quarterfinals
WC	(Czech Republic) Ka Plíšková	2	1
3	(Belarus) V Azarenka	6	6
7	(Czech Republic) K Zakopalová	7	6
2	(Israel) S Pe'er	6^{5}	2

Semifinals
3	(Belarus) V Azarenka	6	6
7	(Czech Republic) K Zakopalová	3	2
