= 2005 ECM Prague Open =

- Date: 9–15 May
- Edition: 14th (ATP) / 4th (WTA)
- Category: Challenger (ATP); Tier IV (WTA)
- Prize money: US$100,000 (ATP); US$145,000 (WTA)
- Surface: Clay, outdoor
- Location: Prague, Czech Republic
- Venue: I. Czech Lawn Tennis Club

Champions

Men's singles
- (Czech Republic) Jan Hernych

Women's singles
- (Russia) Dinara Safina

Men's doubles
- (Australia) Jordan Kerr / (Argentina) Sebastián Prieto

Women's doubles
- (France) Émilie Loit / (Australia) Nicole Pratt
- ECM Prague Open

The 2005 ECM Prague Open was a professional tennis tournament played on clay courts at the I. Czech Lawn Tennis Club in Prague, Czech Republic from in mid-May, 2005. It was the 14th edition of the men's tournament which was part of the 2005 ATP Challenger Series and the 4th edition of the women's tournament which was part of the 2005 WTA Tour as a Tier IV tournament.

== Points and prize money ==
Note: this information was only available for the women's tournament

=== Point distribution ===
Event	W	F	SF	QF	Round of 16	Round of 32	Q	Q3	Q2	Q1
Women's singles	95	67	43	24	12	1	5.5	3.5	2	1
Women's doubles	95	67	43	24	1	—N/a	6.25	—N/a	—N/a	—N/a

=== Prize money ===
Event	W	F	SF	QF	Round of 16	Round of 32	Q3	Q2	Q1
Women's singles	$22,900	$12,345	$6,650	$3,580	$1,925	$1,035	$555	$300	$175
Women's doubles *	$6,750	$3,640	$1,960	$1,050	$565	—N/a	—N/a	—N/a	—N/a

_{* per team}

== Finals ==
=== Men's singles ===
(Czech Republic) Jan Hernych defeated (Czech Republic) Jiří Vaněk, 3–6, 6–4, 6–3

- It was Hernych's 1st singles title of the year, the 2nd consecutive at Prague and his 5th title at the ATP Challenger Series.

=== Women's singles ===
(Russia) Dinara Safina defeated (Czech Republic) Zuzana Ondrášková, 7–6^{(7–2)}, 6–3

- It was Safina's 2nd singles title of the year and the 4th of her career.

=== Men's doubles ===
(Australia) Jordan Kerr / (Argentina) Sebastián Prieto defeated (United States) Travis Parrott / (Netherlands) Rogier Wassen 6–4, 6–3

=== Women's doubles ===
(France) Émilie Loit / (Australia) Nicole Pratt defeated (Croatia) Jelena Kostanić / (Czech Republic) Barbora Strýcová, 6–7^{(6–8)}, 6–4, 6–4
