= 2007 ECM Prague Open – Women's doubles =

Women's doubles
- 2007 ECM Prague Open

Final
- Champions: (Czech Republic) Petra Cetkovská (Czech Republic) Andrea Hlaváčková
- Runners-up: (China) Ji Chunmei (China) Sun Shengnan
- Score: 7-6^{(9–7)}, 6-2

Details
- Draw: 16
- Seeds: 4

Events
Singles	men	women
Doubles	men	women
← 2006 ·	ECM Prague Open	· 2008 →

The women's doubles of the 2007 ECM Prague Open tournament was played on clay in Prague, Czech Republic.

Marion Bartoli and Shahar Pe'er were the defending champions, but neither of them chose to participate that year.

== Seeds ==
1. (France) Nathalie Dechy / (Netherlands) Michaëlla Krajicek (first round)
2. (Czech Republic) Lucie Hradecká / (Czech Republic) Renata Voráčová (semifinals)
3. (Czech Republic) Iveta Benešová / (Czech Republic) Barbora Záhlavová-Strýcová (first round)
4. (Argentina) Gisela Dulko / (Spain) Arantxa Parra Santonja (second round; retired due to Parra Santonja's abdominal strain)

== Draw ==
=== Key ===
- Q = Qualifier
- WC = Wild card
- LL = Lucky loser
- Alt = Alternate
- SE = Special exempt
- PR = Protected ranking
- ITF = ITF entry
- JE = Junior exempt
- w/o = Walkover
- r = Retired
- d = Defaulted
- SR = Special ranking

First round
1	(France) N Dechy (Netherlands) M Krajicek	2	7	[6]
(Germany) J Schruff (United States) N Uberoi	6	5	[10]
(China) C Ji (China) S Sun	6	2	[10]
(Colombia) C Castaño (United States) J Craybas	4	6	[6]
4	(Argentina) G Dulko (Spain) A Parra Santonja	6	5	[10]
(Slovakia) J Gajdošová (Japan) A Morigami	3	7	[6]
(South Africa) N Grandin (France) C Pin	3	4
(New Zealand) L Baker (Australia) N Kriz	6	6
(Czech Republic) P Cetkovská (Czech Republic) A Hlaváčková	6	6
(United States) J Ditty (Canada) S Dubois	2	1
(Czech Republic) M Paštiková (Venezuela) M Sequera	7	6
3	(Czech Republic) I Benešová (Czech Republic) B Z-Strýcová	5	3
(Australia) C Horiatopoulos (China) T Sun	6	4	[3]
(Romania) A Ehritt-Vanc (Russia) A Rodionova	4	6	[10]
WC	(Czech Republic) Ka Plíšková (Czech Republic) Kr Plíšková	2	0
2	(Czech Republic) L Hradecká (Czech Republic) R Voráčová	6	6

Quarterfinals
(Germany) J Schruff (United States) N Uberoi	6	6^{4}	[10]
(China) C Ji (China) S Sun	3	7^{7}	[12]
4	(Argentina) G Dulko (Spain) A Parra Santonja
(New Zealand) L Baker (Australia) N Kriz	w/o
(Czech Republic) P Cetkovská (Czech Republic) A Hlaváčková	6	1	[10]
(Czech Republic) M Paštiková (Venezuela) M Sequera	2	6	[8]
(Romania) A Ehritt-Vanc (Russia) A Rodionova	4	6^{0}
2	(Czech Republic) L Hradecká (Czech Republic) R Voráčová	6	7^{7}

Semifinals
(China) C Ji (China) S Sun	7^{7}	4	[11]
(New Zealand) L Baker (Australia) N Kriz	6^{5}	6	[9]
(Czech Republic) P Cetkovská (Czech Republic) A Hlaváčková	6	6
2	(Czech Republic) L Hradecká (Czech Republic) R Voráčová	4	2

Finals
(China) C Ji (China) S Sun	6^{7}	2
(Czech Republic) P Cetkovská (Czech Republic) A Hlaváčková	7^{9}	6

=== Notes ===
- The winners received $6,240 (per team) and 115 ranking points (as individuals).
- The runners-up received $3,360 and 80 ranking points.
- The last directly accepted team was Petra Cetkovská and Andrea Hlaváčková (combined ranking of 310th).
- The player representative was Sandra Klösel.
