= 2006 ECM Prague Open – Men's singles =

Men's singles
- 2006 ECM Prague Open

Final
- Champion: (Czech Republic) Robin Vik
- Runner-up: (Czech Republic) Jan Hájek
- Score: 6–4, 7–6^{(7–4)}

Events
Singles	men	women
Doubles	men	women
← 2005 ·	ECM Prague Open	· 2007 →

The men's singles of the 2006 ECM Prague Open tournament was played on clay in Prague, Czech Republic.

Jan Hernych was the defending champion, but lost in second round to Tomáš Zíb.

Robin Vik won the title by defeating Jan Hájek 6–4, 7–6^{(7–4)} in the final.

== Seeds ==
1. (Czech Republic) Robin Vik (champion)
2. (Czech Republic) Jan Hernych (second round)
3. (Czech Republic) Lukáš Dlouhý (second round)
4. (Argentina) Carlos Berlocq (first round)
5. (France) Julien Benneteau (first round)
6. (Czech Republic) Jiří Vaněk (first round)
7. (Spain) Albert Montañés (second round)
8. (Paraguay) Ramón Delgado (second round)

== Draw ==
=== Key ===
- Q = Qualifier
- WC = Wild card
- LL = Lucky loser
- Alt = Alternate
- ITF = ITF entry
- PR = Protected ranking
- SR = Special ranking
- SE = Special exempt
- JE = Junior exempt
- JR = Junior Accelerator Programme entrant
- CO = College Accelerator Programme entrant
- NG = Next Gen Accelerator Program entrant
- w/o = Walkover
- r = Retired
- d = Defaulted

=== Finals ===
Semifinals
1	(Czech Republic) Robin Vik	6	6
(Argentina) Sergio Roitman	1	3
Q	(Czech Republic) Jan Hájek	7^{8}	6
Q	(Greece) Konstantinos Economidis	6^{6}	2

Final
1	(Czech Republic) Robin Vik	6	7^{7}
Q	(Czech Republic) Jan Hájek	4	6^{4}

=== Top half ===
First round
1	(Czech Republic) R Vik	6	7
SE	(Algeria) L Ouahab	3	5
(France) J Haehnel	2	2
(Czech Republic) I Minář	6	6
Q	(Italy) S Vagnozzi	6	6^{8}	6
SE	(Spain) M Granollers Pujol	4	7^{10}	2
(France) M Llodra	6	5	6
6	(Czech Republic) J Vaněk	1	7	3
3	(Czech Republic) L Dlouhý	7^{7}	6
WC	(Czech Republic) M Navrátil	6^{1}	4
(United States) A Bogomolov Jr.	1	6^{9}
(Romania) A Pavel	6	7^{11}
WC	(Czech Republic) Dušan Karol	1	6	6^{7}
(Argentina) S Roitman	6	3	7^{9}
(United States) K Kim	7^{7}	6
5	(France) J Benneteau	6^{5}	0

Second round
1	(Czech Republic) R Vik	6	4	6
(Czech Republic) I Minář	4	6	2
Q	(Italy) S Vagnozzi	5	3
(France) M Llodra	7	6
3	(Czech Republic) L Dlouhý	3	3
(Romania) A Pavel	6	6
(Argentina) S Roitman	6	6
(United States) K Kim	3	2

Quarterfinals
1	(Czech Republic) R Vik	7	6
(France) M Llodra	5	2
(Romania) A Pavel	3	2
(Argentina) S Roitman	6	6

Semifinals
1	(Czech Republic) R Vik	6	6
(Argentina) S Roitman	1	3

=== Bottom half ===
First round
8	(Paraguay) R Delgado	6	6
(France) C Saulnier	4	3
(Netherlands) R Sluiter	5	6^{3}
Q	(Czech Republic) J Hájek	7	7^{7}
(Germany) D Gremelmayr	6	6
Q	(Czech Republic) P Kralert	1	3
(Poland) Ł Kubot	7^{7}	6
4	(Argentina) C Berlocq	6^{5}	4
7	(Spain) A Montañés	6	2	6
(France) N Devilder	3	6	1
Q	(Greece) K Economidis	6	6
WC	(Germany) Mike Steinherr	0	1
WC	(Austria) W Schranz	7^{7}	4	5
(Czech Republic) T Zíb	6^{3}	6	7
(Argentina) D Junqueira	3	4
2	(Czech Republic) J Hernych	6	6

Second round
8	(Paraguay) R Delgado	6	1	0
Q	(Czech Republic) J Hájek	4	6	6
(Germany) D Gremelmayr	6	6
(Poland) Ł Kubot	4	2
7	(Spain) A Montañés	5	3
Q	(Greece) K Economidis	7	6
(Czech Republic) T Zíb	4	6	6
2	(Czech Republic) J Hernych	6	4	4

Quarterfinals
Q	(Czech Republic) J Hájek	4	7	6
(Germany) D Gremelmayr	6	5	3
Q	(Greece) K Economidis	6	6
(Czech Republic) T Zíb	1	3

Semifinals
Q	(Czech Republic) J Hájek	7^{8}	6
Q	(Greece) K Economidis	6^{6}	2
