= 2005 ECM Prague Open – Women's singles =

Women's singles
- 2005 ECM Prague Open

Final
- Champion: (Russia) Dinara Safina
- Runner-up: (Czech Republic) Zuzana Ondrášková
- Score: 7–6^{(7–2)}, 6–3

Details
- Draw: 32 (2WC/4Q/1LL)
- Seeds: 8

Events
Singles	men	women
Doubles	men	women
← 1998 ·	ECM Prague Open	· 2006 →

The women's singles of the 2005 ECM Prague Open tournament was played on clay in Prague, Czech Republic.

This event was last held in 1998.

Dinara Safina won the title.

== Seeds ==
1. (Russia) Dinara Safina (Winner)
2. (Czech Republic) Klára Koukalová (semifinals)
3. (Croatia) Jelena Kostanić (second round)
4. (Spain) Nuria Llagostera Vives (withdrew due to a right quadriceps sprain)
5. (Czech Republic) Iveta Benešová (quarterfinals)
6. (Thailand) Tamarine Tanasugarn (first round)
7. (Germany) Marlene Weingärtner (first round)
8. (Slovakia) Martina Suchá (first round)
9. (Spain) Arantxa Parra Santonja (first round)

== Draw ==
=== Key ===
- Q = Qualifier
- WC = Wild card
- LL = Lucky loser
- Alt = Alternate
- ITF = ITF entry
- PR = Protected ranking
- SR = Special ranking
- SE = Special exempt
- JE = Junior exempt
- JR = Junior Accelerator Programme entrant
- CO = College Accelerator Programme entrant
- NG = Next Gen Accelerator Program entrant
- w/o = Walkover
- r = Retired
- d = Defaulted

=== Finals ===
Semifinals
1	(Russia) Dinara Safina	4	6	7
Q	(Spain) Laura Pous Tió	6	2	5
(Czech Republic) Zuzana Ondrášková	6	6
2	(Czech Republic) Klára Koukalová	2	2

Final
1	(Russia) Dinara Safina	7	6
(Czech Republic) Zuzana Ondrášková	6^{2}	3

=== Top half ===
First round
1	(Russia) D Safina	6	4	6
Q	(Czech Republic) L Průšová	3	6	2
(Czech Republic) M Paštiková	6	3	6
(Slovakia) Ľ Cervanová	1	6	0
(Czech Republic) B Strýcová	0	4
(Luxembourg) A Kremer	6	6
WC	(Czech Republic) A Hlaváčková	7	3	4
5	(Czech Republic) I Benešová	5	6	6
9	(Spain) A Parra Santonja	1	1
(United States) J Jackson	6	6
(Puerto Rico) K Brandi	6^{6}	7	6
(France) É Loit	7	5	1
Q	(Spain) L Pous Tió	6	7
(Belarus) A Yakimova	1	5
(Slovakia) H Nagyová	6	6
6	(Thailand) T Tanasugarn	2	4

Second round
1	(Russia) D Safina	6	6
(Czech Republic) M Paštiková	2	2
(Luxembourg) A Kremer	7	4	1
5	(Czech Republic) I Benešová	5	6	6
(United States) J Jackson	2	3
(Puerto Rico) K Brandi	6	6
Q	(Spain) L Pous Tió	3	6	6
(Slovakia) H Nagyová	6	4	4

Quarterfinals
1	(Russia) D Safina	6	6
5	(Czech Republic) I Benešová	1	4
(Puerto Rico) K Brandi	3	2
Q	(Spain) L Pous Tió	6	6

Semifinals
1	(Russia) D Safina	4	6	7
Q	(Spain) L Pous Tió	6	2	5

=== Bottom half ===
First round
7	(Germany) M Weingärtner	4	0
(Argentina) M Díaz Oliva	6	6
(Australia) N Pratt	6	6
LL	(Austria) Y Meusburger	4	1
(Czech Republic) Z Ondrášková	6	6
WC	(Serbia and Montenegro) J Dokić	4	1
(United States) L Osterloh	3	6^{6}
3	(Croatia) J Kostanić	6	7
8	(Slovakia) M Suchá	3	3
(United States) J Craybas	6	6
(South Korea) Y-j Cho	6	6
(Greece) E Daniilidou	2	4
Q	(United States) M Tu	6	3	4
(Slovenia) M Matevžič	4	6	6
Q	(Israel) S Pe'er	3	5
2	(Czech Republic) K Koukalová	6	7

Second round
(Argentina) M Díaz Oliva	6	6
(Australia) N Pratt	2	1
(Czech Republic) Z Ondrášková	7	7
3	(Croatia) J Kostanić	5	5
(United States) J Craybas	7	6
(South Korea) Y-j Cho	5	4
(Slovenia) M Matevžič	3	0	r
2	(Czech Republic) K Koukalová	6	3

Quarterfinals
(Argentina) M Díaz Oliva	5	2
(Czech Republic) Z Ondrášková	7	6
(United States) J Craybas	3	4
2	(Czech Republic) K Koukalová	6	6

Semifinals
(Czech Republic) Z Ondrášková	6	6
2	(Czech Republic) K Koukalová	2	2
