= 2007 ECM Prague Open =

- Date: 7–13 May
- Edition: 16th (ATP) / 6th ( WTA)
- Category: Challenger (ATP); Tier IV (WTA)
- Surface: Clay / outdoor
- Location: Prague, Czech Republic
- Venue: I. Czech Lawn Tennis Club

Champions

Men's singles
- (Czech Republic) Dušan Lojda

Women's singles
- (Japan) Akiko Morigami

Men's doubles
- (Czech Republic) Tomáš Cibulec / (Australia) Jordan Kerr

Women's doubles
- (Czech Republic) Petra Cetkovská / (Czech Republic) Andrea Hlaváčková
- ECM Prague Open

The 2007 ECM Prague Open was a professional tennis tournament played on outdoor clay courts. It was part of the 2007 ATP Challenger Series and of the 2007 WTA Tour as a Tier IV tournament. It took place in Prague, Czech Republic between 7 and 13 May 2007.

The tournament included tennis exhibition involving Goran Ivanisevic and Richard Krajicek.

== Points and prize money ==
=== Point distribution ===
| Event | W | F | SF | QF | Round of 16 | Round of 32 | Q | Q3 | Q2 | Q1 |
| Men's singles | 70 | 49 | 31 | 16 | 7 | 0 | —N/a | —N/a | —N/a | —N/a |
| Men's doubles | 70 | 49 | 31 | 16 | 0 | —N/a | —N/a | —N/a | —N/a | —N/a |
| Women's singles | 115 | 80 | 50 | 30 | 15 | 1 | 7 | 3 | 2 | 1 |
| Women's doubles | 115 | 80 | 50 | 30 | —N/a | 1 | —N/a | —N/a | —N/a | —N/a |

=== Prize money ===
| Event | W | F | SF | QF | Round of 16 | Round of 32 | Q | Q3 | Q2 | Q1 |
| Men's singles | €12,250 | €7,200 | €4,260 | €2,480 | €1,460 | €885 | —N/a | | | |
| Men's doubles | €5,250 | €3,100 | €1,840 | €1,090 | €610 | —N/a | | | | |
| Women's singles | $21,140 | $11,395 | $6,140 | $3,310 | $1,775 | $955 | $515 | $280 | $165 | $0 |
| Women's doubles | $6,240 | $3,360 | $1,810 | $970 | $525 | —N/a | | | | |

== Players ==
=== Men's singles ===
==== Seeds ====
All rankings correspond to the ATP Challenger Tour

| Country | Player | Rank | Seed |
|---|---|---|---|
| ARG | Sergio Roitman | 79 | 1 |
| ARG | Diego Hartfield | 80 | 2 |
| CZE | Jan Hájek | 88 | 3 |
| CZE | Jan Hernych | 90 | 4 |
| THA | Danai Udomchoke | 95 | 5 |
| CZE | Lukáš Dlouhý | 145 | 6 |
| ESP | Iván Navarro | 111 | 7 |
| GBR | Alex Bogdanovic | 119 | 8 |

==== Other entrants ====
The following players received wildcards into the singles main draw:

- (Slovakia) Martin Durdík
- (Czech Republic) Dušan Karol
- (Czech Republic) Dušan Lojda
- (Spain) Félix Mantilla Botella

The following players received entry via a special exempt into the singles main draw:

- (Czech Republic) Bohdan Ulihrach

The following players received entry from the qualifying draw:

- (France) Mathieu Montcourt
- (Latvia) Andis Juška
- (Netherlands) Peter Wessels
- (Finland) Timo Nieminen

==== Withdrawals ====
- (Czech Republic) Bohdan Ulihrach (Left leg)
- (Czech Republic) Jan Hájek (Left knee)

=== Men's doubles ===
==== Seeds ====
All rankings correspond to the ATP Challenger Tour

| Country | Player | Country | Player | Rank | Seed |
|---|---|---|---|---|---|
| CZE | Petr Pála | CZE | Pavel Vízner | 56 | 1 |
| CZE | Leoš Friedl | CZE | David Škoch | 67 | 2 |
| SUI | Yves Allegro | AUS | Stephen Huss | 97 | 3 |
| CZE | Tomáš Cibulec | AUS | Jordan Kerr | 128 | 4 |

==== Other entrants ====
The following pairs received wildcards into the doubles main draw:

- (Czech Republic) Ivo Minář / (Czech Republic) Jiří Vaněk
- (Czech Republic) Ladislav Chramosta / (Czech Republic) Filip Zeman

=== Women's singles ===
==== Seeds ====
| Country | Player | Rank | Seed |
|---|---|---|---|
| FRA | Marion Bartoli | 23 | 1 |
| ARG | Gisela Dulko | 34 | 2 |
| RUS | Olga Poutchkova | 37 | 3 |
| NED | Michaëlla Krajicek | 41 | 4 |
| FRA | Nathalie Dechy | 49 | 5 |
| JPN | Akiko Morigami | 53 | 6 |
| SUI | Virginie Razzano | 59 | 7 |
| RUS | Anastasia Rodionova | 64 | 8 |

==== Other entrants ====
The following players received wildcards into the singles main draw:

- (Czech Republic) Iveta Benešová
- (Czech Republic) Karolína Plíšková
- (Czech Republic) Kristýna Plíšková

The following players received an entry into the singles main draw as lucky losers:

- (Czech Republic) Renata Voráčová

The following players received entry from the qualifying draw:

- (Czech Republic) Barbora Záhlavová-Strýcová
- (Czech Republic) Klára Zakopalová
- (Czech Republic) Andrea Hlaváčková
- (Slovakia) Dominika Cibulková

==== Withdrawals ====
- (Czech Republic) Renata Voráčová
- (Belarus) Victoria Azarenka (Right hip strain)

=== Women's doubles ===
==== Seeds ====
| Country | Player | Country | Player | Rank | Seed |
|---|---|---|---|---|---|
| FRA | Nathalie Dechy | NED | Michaëlla Krajicek | 68 | 1 |
| CZE | Lucie Hradecká | CZE | Renata Voráčová | 105 | 2 |
| CZE | Iveta Benešová | CZE | Barbora Záhlavová-Strýcová | 128 | 3 |
| ARG | Gisela Dulko | ESP | Arantxa Parra Santonja | 133 | 4 |

==== Other entrants ====
The following pairs received wildcards into the doubles main draw:

- (Czech Republic) Kristýna Plíšková / (Czech Republic) Karolína Plíšková

==== Withdrawals ====
- (Spain) Arantxa Parra Santonja (Abdominal strain)

== Finals ==
=== Men's singles ===
- (Czech Republic) Dušan Lojda defeated (Czech Republic) Jiří Vaněk, 6–7^{(3–7)}, 6–2, 7–6^{(7–5)}

=== Men's doubles ===
- (Czech Republic) Tomáš Cibulec / (Australia) Jordan Kerr defeated (Czech Republic) Leoš Friedl / (Czech Republic) David Škoch, 6–4, 6–2

=== Women's singles ===
- (Japan) Akiko Morigami defeated (France) Marion Bartoli, 6–1, 6–3

=== Women's doubles ===
- (Czech Republic) Petra Cetkovská / (Czech Republic) Andrea Hlaváčková defeated (China) Ji Chunmei / (China) Sun Shengnan, 7–6^{(9–7)}, 6–2
