= 2008 ECM Prague Open =

- Date: 28 April – 4 May
- Edition: 17th (ATP) / 7th (WTA)
- Surface: Clay / outdoor
- Location: Prague, Czech Republic
- Venue: I. Czech Lawn Tennis Club

Champions

Men's singles
- (Czech Republic) Jan Hernych

Women's singles
- (Russia) Vera Zvonareva

Men's doubles
- (Czech Republic) Lukáš Dlouhý / (Czech Republic) Petr Pála

Women's doubles
- (Czech Republic) Andrea Hlaváčková / (Czech Republic) Lucie Hradecká
- ECM Prague Open

The 2008 ECM Prague Open was a tennis tournament played on outdoor clay courts. It was the 17th edition of the ECM Prague Open, and was part of the Tier IV Series of the 2008 WTA Tour and of the 2008 ATP Challenger Tretorn Serie+. It took place at the I. Czech Lawn Tennis Club in Prague, Czech Republic, from 28 April until 4 May 2008.

The tournament included tennis exhibition involving Thomas Muster and Ctislav Doseděl.

== Finals ==
=== Men's singles ===
(Czech Republic) Jan Hernych defeated (Czech Republic) Lukáš Dlouhý, 4–6, 6–2, 6–4

=== Women's singles ===
(Russia) Vera Zvonareva defeated (Belarus) Victoria Azarenka, 7–6^{(7–2)}, 6–2

- It was Zvonareva's 1st title of the year, and her 6th overall.

=== Men's doubles ===
(Czech Republic) Lukáš Dlouhý / (Czech Republic) Petr Pála defeated (Czech Republic) Dušan Karol / (Czech Republic) Jaroslav Pospíšil, 6–7^{(2–7)}, 6–4, [10–6]

=== Women's doubles ===
(Czech Republic) Andrea Hlaváčková / (Czech Republic) Lucie Hradecká defeated (United States) Jill Craybas / (Netherlands) Michaëlla Krajicek, 1–6, 6–3, [10–6]
