= 2008 ECM Prague Open – Men's doubles =

Men's doubles
- 2008 ECM Prague Open

Final
- Champions: (Czech Republic) Lukáš Dlouhý (Czech Republic) Petr Pála
- Runners-up: (Czech Republic) Dušan Karol (Czech Republic) Jaroslav Pospíšil
- Score: 6–7^{(2–7)}, 6–4, [10–6]

Events
Singles	men	women
Doubles	men	women
← 2007 ·	ECM Prague Open	· 2011 →

The men's doubles of the 2008 ECM Prague Open tournament was played on clay in Prague, Czech Republic.

Tomáš Cibulec and Jordan Kerr were the defending champions, but none competed this year, with both players competing separately in Munich at the same week.

Lukáš Dlouhý and Petr Pála won the title by defeating Dušan Karol and Jaroslav Pospíšil 6–7^{(2–7)}, 6–4, [10–6] in the final.

== Seeds ==
1. (Czech Republic) Lukáš Dlouhý / (Czech Republic) Petr Pála (champions)
2. (Israel) Harel Levy / (United States) Jim Thomas (semifinals)
3. (Argentina) Brian Dabul / (Argentina) Leonardo Mayer (semifinals)
4. (Poland) Tomasz Bednarek / (Netherlands Antilles) Martijn van Haasteren (first round)

== Draw ==
=== Key ===
- Q = Qualifier
- WC = Wild card
- LL = Lucky loser
- Alt = Alternate
- SE = Special exempt
- PR = Protected ranking
- ITF = ITF entry
- JE = Junior exempt
- w/o = Walkover
- r = Retired
- d = Defaulted
- SR = Special ranking

=== Draw ===
First round
1	(Czech Republic) L Dlouhý (Czech Republic) P Pála	6	6
WC	(Czech Republic) D Lojda (Czech Republic) F Zeman	2	3
(Czech Republic) J Hernych (Slovakia) I Zelenay	4	6	[7]
Q	(Czech Republic) J Blecha (Czech Republic) R Jebavý	6	3	[10]
3	(Argentina) B Dabul (Argentina) L Mayer	6	6
(France) N Devilder (France) A Gensse	4	3
(Croatia) I Cerović (Croatia) I Dodig	7^{7}	4	[10]
(Netherlands) B Beks (Poland) D Olejniczak	6^{3}	6	[4]
WC	(Czech Republic) D Karol (Czech Republic) J Pospíšil	6	6
WC	(Czech Republic) J Jiskra (Czech Republic) J Kubeš	0	0
(Czech Republic) B Ulihrach (Czech Republic) J Vacek	6	6
4	(Poland) T Bednarek (Netherlands Antilles) M van Haasteren	3	1
(Austria) A Haider-Maurer (Georgia (country)) I Labadze	6	1	[5]
(Romania) A Cruciat (Czech Republic) J Minář	3	6	[10]
(Czech Republic) L Rosol (Austria) M Slanar	6	5	[8]
2	(Israel) H Levy (United States) J Thomas	3	7	[10]

Quarterfinals
1	(Czech Republic) L Dlouhý (Czech Republic) P Pála	6	6
Q	(Czech Republic) J Blecha (Czech Republic) R Jebavý	0	3
3	(Argentina) B Dabul (Argentina) L Mayer	7^{7}	7^{7}
(Croatia) I Cerović (Croatia) I Dodig	6^{0}	6^{5}
WC	(Czech Republic) D Karol (Czech Republic) J Pospíšil	w/o
(Czech Republic) B Ulihrach (Czech Republic) J Vacek
(Romania) A Cruciat (Czech Republic) J Minář	6^{6}	3
2	(Israel) H Levy (United States) J Thomas	7^{8}	6

Semifinals
1	(Czech Republic) L Dlouhý (Czech Republic) P Pála	6	7^{8}
3	(Argentina) B Dabul (Argentina) L Mayer	4	6^{6}
WC	(Czech Republic) D Karol (Czech Republic) J Pospíšil	6	6
2	(Israel) H Levy (United States) J Thomas	2	2

Final
1	(Czech Republic) L Dlouhý (Czech Republic) P Pála	6^{2}	6	[10]
WC	(Czech Republic) D Karol (Czech Republic) J Pospíšil	7^{7}	4	[6]
