= 2005 ECM Prague Open – Women's doubles =

Women's doubles
- 2005 ECM Prague Open

Final
- Champions: (France) Émilie Loit (Australia) Nicole Pratt
- Runners-up: (Slovakia) Jelena Kostanić (Czech Republic) Barbora Strýcová
- Score: 6–7^{(6–8)}, 6–4, 6–4

Details
- Draw: 16
- Seeds: 4

Events
Singles	men	women
Doubles	men	women
- Prague Open

The women's doubles of the 2005 ECM Prague Open tournament was played on clay in Prague, Czech Republic.

This event was last held in 1998.

Émilie Loit and Nicole Pratt won the title.

== Seeds ==
1. (Czech Republic) Iveta Benešová / (Russia) Dinara Safina (semifinals)
2. (France) Émilie Loit / (Australia) Nicole Pratt (champions)
3. (Greece) Eleni Daniilidou / (Thailand) Tamarine Tanasugarn (first round)
4. (Czech Republic) Gabriela Chmelinová / (Czech Republic) Michaela Paštiková (first round)

== Draw ==
Key

- Q = Qualifier
- WC = Wild card
- LL = Lucky loser
- Alt = Alternate
- ITF = ITF entry
- PR = Protected ranking
- SR = Special ranking
- SE = Special exempt
- JE = Junior exempt
- JR = Junior Accelerator Programme entrant
- CO = College Accelerator Programme entrant
- NG = Next Gen Accelerator Program entrant
- w/o = Walkover
- r = Retired
- d = Defaulted

First round
1	(Czech Republic) I Benešová (Russia) D Safina	6	7
(Netherlands) M Krajicek (Slovakia) H Nagyová	4	5
(Poland) K Jans (Poland) A Rosolska	6	6
WC	(Czech Republic) A Hlaváčková (Czech Republic) D Pavlíková	3	1
4	(Czech Republic) G Chmelinová (Czech Republic) M Paštiková	5	3
(Croatia) J Kostanić (Czech Republic) B Strýcová	7	6
(Croatia) D Jurak (United States) L Osterloh	2	6	6
(Argentina) E Krauth (Germany) J Wöhr	6	1	4
(United States) J Hopkins (United States) M Tu	6	4	1
(Latvia) L Dekmeijere (Japan) N Miyagi	3	6	6
Q	(Czech Republic) O Vymetálková (Czech Republic) L Hradecká	7	6
3	(Greece) E Daniilidou (Thailand) T Tanasugarn	5	2
(Austria) D Klemenschits (Austria) S Klemenschits	3	4
(Canada) M Drake (Czech Republic) V Uhlířová	6	6
(United States) J Craybas (Germany) M Weingärtner	3	2
2	(France) É Loit (Australia) N Pratt	6	6

Quarterfinals
1	(Czech Republic) I Benešová (Russia) D Safina	6	6
(Poland) K Jans (Poland) A Rosolska	0	3
(Croatia) J Kostanić (Czech Republic) B Strýcová	7	7
(Croatia) D Jurak (United States) L Osterloh	5	5
(Latvia) L Dekmeijere (Japan) N Miyagi	4	7	4
Q	(Czech Republic) O Vymetálková (Czech Republic) L Hradecká	6	5	6
(Canada) M Drake (Czech Republic) V Uhlířová	2	2
2	(France) É Loit (Australia) N Pratt	6	6

Semifinals
1	(Czech Republic) I Benešová (Russia) D Safina	6^{4}	2
(Croatia) J Kostanić (Czech Republic) B Strýcová	7	6
Q	(Czech Republic) O Vymetálková (Czech Republic) L Hradecká	4	1
2	(France) É Loit (Australia) N Pratt	6	6

Final
(Croatia) J Kostanić (Czech Republic) B Strýcová	7	4	4
2	(France) É Loit (Australia) N Pratt	6^{6}	6	6
