= 2006 ECM Prague Open – Men's doubles =

Men's doubles
- 2006 ECM Prague Open

Final
- Champions: (Czech Republic) Petr Pála (Czech Republic) David Škoch
- Runners-up: (Paraguay) Ramón Delgado (Argentina) Sergio Roitman
- Score: 6–0, 6–0

Events
Singles	men	women
Doubles	men	women
- ATP Prague Open

The men's doubles of the 2006 ECM Prague Open tournament was played on clay in Prague, Czech Republic.

Jordan Kerr and Sebastián Prieto were the defending champions, but Prieto did not compete this year. Kerr teamed up with Ashley Fisher and lost in semifinals to Ramón Delgado and Sergio Roitman.

Petr Pála and David Škoch won the title by defeating Ramón Delgado and Sergio Roitman 6–0, 6–0 in the final.

== Seeds ==
1. (Czech Republic) Lukáš Dlouhý / (Czech Republic) Pavel Vízner (first round)
2. (Czech Republic) Petr Pála / (Czech Republic) David Škoch (champions)
3. (Australia) Ashley Fisher / (Australia) Jordan Kerr (semifinals)
4. (South Africa) Jeff Coetzee / (Netherlands) Rogier Wassen (semifinals)

== Draw ==
Key

- Q = Qualifier
- WC = Wild card
- LL = Lucky loser
- Alt = Alternate
- ITF = ITF entry
- PR = Protected ranking
- SR = Special ranking
- SE = Special exempt
- JE = Junior exempt
- JR = Junior Accelerator Programme entrant
- CO = College Accelerator Programme entrant
- NG = Next Gen Accelerator Program entrant
- w/o = Walkover
- r = Retired
- d = Defaulted

=== Draw ===
First round
1	(Czech Republic) L Dlouhý (Czech Republic) P Vízner	4	4
(Czech Republic) R Vik (Czech Republic) T Zíb	6	6
WC	(Czech Republic) J Hájek (Czech Republic) D Lojda	4	6	[7]
(Paraguay) R Delgado (Argentina) S Roitman	6	1	[10]
3	(Australia) A Fisher (Australia) J Kerr	6	6
WC	(Czech Republic) M Damm (Czech Republic) Dušan Karol	4	4
(Czech Republic) J Hernych (Czech Republic) J Vacek	7^{7}	6
(Sweden) J Landsberg (Switzerland) J-C Scherrer	6^{4}	2
(Argentina) L Arnold Ker (Netherlands) R Sluiter	6	6
(United States) A Bogomolov Jr. (United States) K Kim	3	1
(Argentina) C Berlocq (Czech Republic) J Vaněk	4	0
4	(South Africa) J Coetzee (Netherlands) R Wassen	6	6
WC	(Czech Republic) M Navrátil (Czech Republic) Filip Zeman	1	1
Q	(Romania) F Mergea (Romania) A Pavel	6	6
(Czech Republic) T Cibulec (Poland) Ł Kubot	2	6	[10]
2	(Czech Republic) P Pála (Czech Republic) D Škoch	6	2	[12]

Quarterfinals
(Czech Republic) R Vik (Czech Republic) T Zíb	6^{5}	4
(Paraguay) R Delgado (Argentina) S Roitman	7^{7}	6
3	(Australia) A Fisher (Australia) J Kerr	6	7^{7}
(Czech Republic) J Hernych (Czech Republic) J Vacek	3	6^{2}
(Argentina) L Arnold Ker (Netherlands) R Sluiter	4	3
4	(South Africa) J Coetzee (Netherlands) R Wassen	6	6
Q	(Romania) F Mergea (Romania) A Pavel	4	1
2	(Czech Republic) P Pála (Czech Republic) D Škoch	6	6

Semifinals
(Paraguay) R Delgado (Argentina) S Roitman	4	6	[13]
3	(Australia) A Fisher (Australia) J Kerr	6	4	[11]
4	(South Africa) J Coetzee (Netherlands) R Wassen	5	6	[10]
2	(Czech Republic) P Pála (Czech Republic) D Škoch	7	2	[12]

Final
(Paraguay) R Delgado (Argentina) S Roitman	0	0
2	(Czech Republic) P Pála (Czech Republic) D Škoch	6	6
