= 1983 Swiss Open =

- Date: 4–10 July
- Edition: 37th
- Category: Grand Prix
- Draw: 32S / 16D
- Prize money: $100,000
- Surface: Clay / outdoor
- Location: Gstaad, Switzerland

Champions

Singles
- (United States) Sandy Mayer

Doubles
- (Czechoslovakia) Pavel Složil / (Czechoslovakia) Tomáš Šmíd
- Suisse Open Gstaad

The 1983 Swiss Open was a men's tennis tournament played on outdoor clay courts in Gstaad, Switzerland that was part of the 1983 Volvo Grand Prix tennis circuit. It was the 37th edition of the tournament and was held from 4 July through 10 July 1983. Fifth-seeded Sandy Mayer won the singles title.

== Finals ==
=== Singles ===
(United States) Sandy Mayer defeated (Czechoslovakia) Tomáš Šmíd 6–0, 6–3, 6–2

- It was Mayer's only singles title of the year and the 11th and last of his career.

=== Doubles ===
(Czechoslovakia) Pavel Složil / (Czechoslovakia) Tomáš Šmíd defeated (United Kingdom) Colin Dowdeswell / (Switzerland) Wojciech Fibak 6–7, 6–4, 6–2
