= 2013 Crédit Agricole Suisse Open Gstaad =

- Date: 20–28 July
- Edition: 46th
- Category: ATP World Tour 250 Series
- Draw: 28S / 16D
- Prize money: €410,200
- Surface: Clay / outdoor
- Location: Gstaad, Switzerland
- Venue: Roy Emerson Arena

Champions

Singles
- (Russia) Mikhail Youzhny

Doubles
- (United Kingdom) Jamie Murray / (Australia) John Peers
- Swiss Open

The 2013 Crédit Agricole Suisse Open Gstaad was a men's tennis tournament played on outdoor clay courts. It was the 46th edition of the Crédit Agricole Suisse Open Gstaad, and was part of the ATP World Tour 250 Series of the 2013 ATP World Tour. It took place at the Roy Emerson Arena in Gstaad, Switzerland, from 20 July through 28 July 2013. Sixth-seeded Mikhail Youzhny won the singles title.

== Finals ==
=== Singles ===
- (Russia) Mikhail Youzhny defeated (Netherlands) Robin Haase, 6–3, 6–4

=== Doubles ===
- (United Kingdom) Jamie Murray / (Australia) John Peers defeated (Spain) Pablo Andújar / (Spain) Guillermo García-López, 6–3, 6–4

== Singles main draw entrants ==
=== Seeds ===
Country	Player	Rank^{1}	Seed
SUI	Roger Federer	5	1
SUI	Stanislas Wawrinka	10	2
SRB	Janko Tipsarević	16	3
ARG	Juan Mónaco	20	4
ESP	Feliciano López	31	5
RUS	Mikhail Youzhny	32	6
CZE	Lukáš Rosol	40	7
ESP	Roberto Bautista-Agut	49	8

- ^{1} Rankings are as of July 15, 2013

=== Other entrants ===
The following players received wildcards into the singles main draw:

- (Switzerland) Marco Chiudinelli
- (Switzerland) Roger Federer
- (Switzerland) Henri Laaksonen

The following players received entry from the qualifying draw:

- (Germany) Dustin Brown
- (Romania) Victor Crivoi
- (Czech Republic) Jan Hernych
- (Brazil) João Souza

=== Withdrawals ===
Before the tournament

- (France) Jérémy Chardy
- (Russia) Nikolay Davydenko
- (France) Benoît Paire (elbow injury)

=== Retirements ===
- (Spain) Roberto Bautista-Agut (back injury)
- (Switzerland) Stanislas Wawrinka (low back injury)

== Doubles main draw entrants ==
=== Seeds ===
Country	Player	Country	Player	Rank^{1}	Seed
ITA	Daniele Bracciali	SVK	Filip Polášek	88	1
SWE	Johan Brunström	RSA	Raven Klaasen	109	2
GBR	Jamie Murray	AUS	John Peers	122	3
GER	Dustin Brown	AUS	Paul Hanley	126	4

- Rankings are as of July 15, 2013

=== Other entrants ===
The following pairs received wildcards into the doubles main draw:

- (Switzerland) Marco Chiudinelli / (Switzerland) Henri Laaksonen
- (Switzerland) Alexander Ritschard / (Switzerland) Alexander Sadecky

=== Withdrawals ===
During the tournament

- (Spain) Roberto Bautista-Agut (back injury)
