= 2017 Swiss Open Gstaad =

- Date: 24 – 30 July
- Edition: 50th
- Category: ATP World Tour 250 Series
- Draw: 28S/16D
- Prize money: €482,060
- Surface: Clay
- Location: Gstaad, Switzerland
- Venue: Roy Emerson Arena

Champions

Singles
- (Italy) Fabio Fognini

Doubles
- (Austria) Oliver Marach / (Austria) Philipp Oswald
- Swiss Open Gstaad

The 2017 Swiss Open Gstaad (also known as the 2017 J. Safra Sarasin Swiss Open Gstaad for sponsorship reasons) was a men's tennis tournament played on outdoor clay courts. It was the 50th edition of the Swiss Open, and part of the ATP World Tour 250 Series of the 2017 ATP World Tour. It took place at the Roy Emerson Arena in Gstaad, Switzerland, from 24 July through 30 July 2017. Fourth-seeded Fabio Fognini won the singles title.

== Finals ==
=== Singles ===
- (Italy) Fabio Fognini defeated (Germany) Yannick Hanfmann 6–4, 7–5

=== Doubles ===
- (Austria) Oliver Marach / (Austria) Philipp Oswald defeated (France) Jonathan Eysseric / (Croatia) Franko Škugor 6–3, 4–6, [10–8]

== Singles main draw entrants ==
=== Seeds ===
| Country | Player | Rank^{1} | Seed |
|---|---|---|---|
| BEL | David Goffin | 14 | 1 |
| ESP | Roberto Bautista Agut | 19 | 2 |
| ESP | Feliciano López | 26 | 3 |
| ITA | Fabio Fognini | 27 | 4 |
| ITA | Paolo Lorenzi | 34 | 5 |
| NED | Robin Haase | 42 | 6 |
| SRB | Dušan Lajović | 61 | 7 |
| POR | João Sousa | 63 | 8 |

- ^{1} Rankings are as of July 17, 2017

=== Other entrants ===
The following players received wildcards into the singles main draw:

- (Switzerland) Antoine Bellier
- (Switzerland) Marco Chiudinelli
- (Italy) Fabio Fognini

The following players received entry from the qualifying draw:

- (Germany) Daniel Brands
- (Italy) Lorenzo Giustino
- (Germany) Yannick Hanfmann
- (France) Gleb Sakharov

=== Withdrawals ===
Before the tournament

- (France) Jérémy Chardy →replaced by (Colombia) Santiago Giraldo
- (Romania) Marius Copil →replaced by (Latvia) Ernests Gulbis
- (Serbia) Viktor Troicki →replaced by (Moldova) Radu Albot

== Doubles main draw entrants ==
=== Seeds ===
| Country | Player | Country | Player | Rank^{1} | Seed |
|---|---|---|---|---|---|
| NZL | Marcus Daniell | BRA | Marcelo Demoliner | 96 | 1 |
| AUT | Oliver Marach | AUT | Philipp Oswald | 98 | 2 |
| CZE | Roman Jebavý | NED | Matwé Middelkoop | 120 | 3 |
| FRA | Jonathan Eysseric | CRO | Franko Škugor | 128 | 4 |

- Rankings are as of July 17, 2017

=== Other entrants ===
The following pairs received wildcards into the doubles main draw:

- (Switzerland) Antoine Bellier / (Switzerland) Luca Margaroli
- (Germany) Dustin Brown / (Switzerland) Marco Chiudinelli
