= 1972 Suisse Open Gstaad – Singles =

Singles
- 1972 Suisse Open Gstaad

Final
- Champion: (Spain) Andrés Gimeno
- Runner-up: (Italy) Adriano Panatta
- Score: 7–5, 9–8, 6–4

Details
- Draw: 32

Events
Singles	Doubles
← 1971 ·	Suisse Open Gstaad	· 1973 →

John Newcombe was the defending champion but he did not take part in the 1972 edition.

Andrés Gimeno won the title, defeating Adriano Panatta in the final 7–5, 9–8, 6–4.

== Draw ==
=== Key ===
- Q = Qualifier
- WC = Wild card
- LL = Lucky loser
- Alt = Alternate
- SE = Special exempt
- PR = Protected ranking
- ITF = ITF entry
- JE = Junior exempt
- w/o = Walkover
- r = Retired
- d = Defaulted
- SR = Special ranking

=== Final ===
Final
(Italy) Adriano Panatta	5	8	6
(Spain) Andrés Gimeno	7	9	6

=== Section 1 ===
First round
(France) Pierre Barthès	6	6
(South Africa) Derek Schroder	3	3
(United States) Roscoe Tanner	6	6
(Czechoslovakia) Theodor Stalder	2	4
(Romania) Ion Țiriac	6	6
(South Africa) Terry Ryan	1	2
(West Germany) Wilhelm Bungert	7	6
(United States) Dick Bohrnstedt	5	3
(Italy) Adriano Panatta	6	6
(Poland) Tadeusz Nowicki	1	2
(Spain) Antonio Muñoz	6	6
(Australia) Ian Fletcher	3	1
(South Africa) Pat Cramer	2	3
(France) Jean-Loup Rouyer	6	6
(Czechoslovakia) Jan Kukal	6	7
(Japan) Kenichi Hirai	2	5

Second round
(France) Pierre Barthès	4	4
(United States) Roscoe Tanner	6	6
(Romania) Ion Țiriac	6
(West Germany) Wilhelm Bungert	2	R
(Italy) Adriano Panatta	8	6
(Spain) Antonio Muñoz	6	2
(France) Jean-Loup Rouyer	6	6
(Czechoslovakia) Jan Kukal	4	2

Quarterfinals
(United States) Roscoe Tanner	2	2
(Romania) Ion Țiriac	6	6
(Italy) Adriano Panatta	6	6
(France) Jean-Loup Rouyer	2	4

Semifinals
(Romania) Ion Țiriac	9	5	0
(Italy) Adriano Panatta	8	7	6

=== Section 2 ===
First round
(Italy) Antonio Zugarelli	2	1
(Belgium) Patrick Hombergen	6	6
(Colombia) Iván Molina	6	1	1
(New Zealand) Onny Parun	4	6	6
(Switzerland) Dimitri Sturdza	4	2
(Brazil) Thomaz Koch	6	6
(Argentina) Guillermo Vilas	3	0
(Australia) B Phillips-Moore	6	6
(United States) Sandy Mayer	6	6
(Czechoslovakia) Milan Holeček	4	4
(Poland) Wieslaw Gasiorek	4	2
(South Africa) Ray Moore	6	6
(Switzerland) Matthias Werren	1	8
(Socialist Federal Republic of Yugoslavia) Nikki Spear	6	9
(Socialist Federal Republic of Yugoslavia) Boro Jovanović
(Spain) Andrés Gimeno	w	/	o

Second round
(Belgium) P Hombergen	6	6
(New Zealand) Onny Parun	1	2
(Brazil) Thomaz Koch	5	3
(Australia) B Phillips-Moore	7	6
(United States) Sandy Mayer	6	6
(South Africa) Ray Moore	1	1
(Socialist Federal Republic of Yugoslavia) Nikki Spear	1	3
(Spain) Andrés Gimeno	6	6

Quarterfinals
(Belgium) P Hombergen	6	3	2
(Australia) B Phillips-Moore	3	6	6
(United States) Sandy Mayer	2	2
(Spain) Andrés Gimeno	6	6

Semifinals
(Australia) B Phillips-Moore	4	3	7
(Spain) Andrés Gimeno	6	6	9
