= 2010 Allianz Suisse Open Gstaad =

- Date: 25 July – 1 August
- Edition: 43rd
- Category: ATP World Tour 250 Series
- Draw: 32S / 16D
- Prize money: €398,250
- Location: Gstaad, Switzerland
- Venue: Roy Emerson Arena

Champions

Singles
- (Spain) Nicolás Almagro

Doubles
- (Sweden) Johan Brunström / (Finland) Jarkko Nieminen
- Swiss Open

The 2010 Allianz Suisse Open Gstaad was a men's tennis tournament played on outdoor clay courts. It was the 42nd edition of the Allianz Suisse Open Gstaad, and was part of the ATP World Tour 250 Series of the 2009 ATP Tour. It took place at the Roy Emerson Arena in Gstaad, Switzerland, from 25 July through 1 August 2010. Second-seeded Nicolás Almagro won the singles title.

== Finals ==
=== Singles ===
(Spain) Nicolás Almagro defeated (France) Richard Gasquet, 7–5, 6–1

- It was Almagro's second title of the year and 7th of his career.

=== Doubles ===
(Sweden) Johan Brunström / (Finland) Jarkko Nieminen defeated (Brazil) Marcelo Melo / (Brazil) Bruno Soares, 6–3, 6–7^{(4–7)}, [11–9]

== ATP entrants ==
=== Seeds ===
Player	Nation	Ranking*	Seeding
Mikhail Youzhny	RUS	14	1
Nicolás Almagro	ESP	18	2
Thomaz Bellucci	BRA	22	3
Albert Montañés	ESP	24	4
Tommy Robredo	ESP	36	5
Victor Hănescu	ROU	43	6
Richard Gasquet	FRA	46	7
Paul-Henri Mathieu	FRA	52	8

*Seedings based on the July 19, 2010 rankings.

=== Other entrants ===
The following players received wildcards into the singles main draw

- (Switzerland) Michael Lammer
- (Switzerland) Alexander Sadecky
- (Argentina) Agustín Velotti

The following players received entry from the qualifying draw:

- (Uzbekistan) Farrukh Dustov
- (Austria) Andreas Haider-Maurer
- (Switzerland) Yann Marti
- (Kazakhstan) Yuri Schukin
