= 1994 Suisse Open Gstaad – Singles =

Singles
- 1994 Suisse Open Gstaad

Final
- Champion: (Spain) Sergi Bruguera
- Runner-up: (France) Guy Forget
- Score: 3–6, 7–5, 6–2, 6–1

Details
- Draw: 32 (3WC / 4Q)
- Seeds: 8

Events
Singles	Doubles
← 1993 ·	Swiss Open	· 1995 →

The 1994 Suisse Open Gstaad – Singles was an event of the 1994 Suisse Open Gstaad men's tennis tournament and was played on outdoor red clay courts in Gstaad, Switzerland from 4 July until 11 July 1994. The draw comprised 32 players and eight of them were seeded. First-seeded Sergi Bruguera was the two-time defending Swiss Open singles champion and retained his title by defeating unseeded Guy Forget in the final, 3–6, 7–5, 6–2, 6–1.

== Seeds ==
1. (Spain) Sergi Bruguera (champion)
2. (Ukraine) Andrei Medvedev (first round)
3. (Austria) Thomas Muster (quarterfinals)
4. (Spain) Alberto Berasategui (second round)
5. (France) Cédric Pioline (second round)
6. (Russia) Yevgeny Kafelnikov (semifinals)
7. (Spain) Carlos Costa (second round)
8. (Switzerland) Marc Rosset (second round)

== Draw ==
=== Key ===
- Q = Qualifier
- WC = Wild card
- LL = Lucky loser
- Alt = Alternate
- SE = Special exempt
- PR = Protected ranking
- ITF = ITF entry
- JE = Junior exempt
- w/o = Walkover
- r = Retired
- d = Defaulted
- SR = Special ranking

=== Finals ===
Semifinals
1	(Spain) Sergi Bruguera	6	6
(Italy) Andrea Gaudenzi	4	1
6	(Russia) Yevgeny Kafelnikov	5	3
WC	(France) Guy Forget	7	6

Final
1	(Spain) Sergi Bruguera	3	7	6	6
WC	(France) Guy Forget	6	5	2	1

=== Top half ===
First round
1	(Spain) S Bruguera	6	6
(Australia) P Rafter	4	2
(Spain) À Corretja	6	6
Q	(United States) A Reichel	3	2
WC	(Spain) E Sánchez	7	7^{7}
(Russia) A Cherkasov	5	6^{2}
Q	(Austria) R Burtscher	4	1
8	(Switzerland) M Rosset	6	6
4	(Spain) A Berasategui	7	6
(Morocco) Y El Aynaoui	5	3
(Israel) A Mansdorf	4	4
Q	(Chile) M Ríos	6	6
(Italy) A Gaudenzi	6	6
Q	(Germany) CU Steeb	3	4
(Germany) MK Goellner	6	3	6^{3}
5	(France) C Pioline	4	6	7^{7}

Second round
1	(Spain) S Bruguera	7	6
(Spain) À Corretja	5	0
WC	(Spain) E Sánchez	7	6
8	(Switzerland) M Rosset	5	3
4	(Spain) A Berasategui	6	3	6^{1}
Q	(Chile) M Ríos	4	6	7^{7}
(Italy) A Gaudenzi	6	3	7^{7}
5	(France) C Pioline	1	6	6^{2}

Quarterfinals
1	(Spain) S Bruguera	6	6
WC	(Spain) E Sánchez	3	0
Q	(Chile) M Ríos	4	6	3
(Italy) A Gaudenzi	6	3	6

Semifinals
1	(Spain) S Bruguera	6	6
(Italy) A Gaudenzi	4	1

=== Bottom half ===
First round
6	(Russia) Y Kafelnikov	6	6
(Czech Republic) D Vacek	3	2
(Russia) A Volkov	6	1	6^{2}
(Czech Republic) K Nováček	3	6	7^{7}
(Germany) K Braasch	6^{11}	3
(Spain) J Sánchez	7^{13}	6
WC	(Switzerland) L Manta	1	3
3	(Austria) T Muster	6	6
7	(Spain) C Costa	7^{7}	6
(Italy) S Pescosolido	6^{3}	4
(Haiti) R Agénor	2	7^{7}	2
(France) A Boetsch	6	6^{4}	6
(Italy) R Furlan	3	7^{8}	6
(United States) P McEnroe	6	6^{6}	2
WC	(France) G Forget	6	7
2	(Ukraine) A Medvedev	3	5

Second round
6	(Russia) Y Kafelnikov	2	6	6
(Czech Republic) K Nováček	6	2	3
(Spain) J Sánchez	4	0
3	(Austria) T Muster	6	6
7	(Spain) C Costa	3	4
(France) A Boetsch	6	6
(Italy) R Furlan	6	3	2
WC	(France) G Forget	4	6	6

Quarterfinals
6	(Russia) Y Kafelnikov	7^{11}	3	7^{7}
3	(Austria) T Muster	6^{9}	6	6^{4}
(France) A Boetsch	3	6^{3}
WC	(France) G Forget	6	7^{7}

Semifinals
6	(Russia) Y Kafelnikov	5	3
WC	(France) G Forget	7	6
