= 2011 Credit Agricole Suisse Open Gstaad – Singles Qualifying =

This article displays the qualifying draw of the 2011 Credit Agricole Suisse Open Gstaad.

== Players ==
=== Seeds ===
1. (Brazil) João Souza (qualified)
2. (Poland) Michał Przysiężny (second round)
3. (Austria) Martin Fischer (qualified)
4. (Australia) Peter Luczak (qualified)
5. (Spain) Guillermo Alcaide (qualifying competition)
6. (Sweden) Christian Lindell (second round)
7. (France) Florian Reynet (qualifying competition)
8. (Czech Republic) Roman Vögeli (qualifying competition)

=== Qualifiers ===
1. (Brazil) João Souza
2. (Switzerland) Yann Marti
3. (Austria) Martin Fischer
4. (Australia) Peter Luczak

== Qualifying draw ==
=== First qualifier ===
First Round				Second Round				Qualifying Competition
				1	(Brazil) João Souza	6	6
(Switzerland) Yann Minster	6	3	6^{0}		(France) Marc Auradou	2	2
(France) Marc Auradou	3	6	7^{7}					1	(Brazil) João Souza	7^{7}	6
(Switzerland) Henri Laaksonen	7	6							(Switzerland) Henri Laaksonen	6^{5}	2
(Switzerland) Robin Roshardt	5	2			(Switzerland) Henri Laaksonen	7	6
				6	(Sweden) Christian Lindell	5	3

=== Second qualifier ===
First Round					Second Round				Qualifying Competition
					2	(Poland) Michał Przysiężny	2	3
	(Switzerland) Yann Marti	2	6	7		(Switzerland) Yann Marti	6	6
	(Switzerland) Joss Espasandin	6	4	5						(Switzerland) Yann Marti	7^{7}	6
WC	(Switzerland) Raphael Mori	0	1						5	(Spain) Guillermo Alcaide	6^{4}	4
WC	(Switzerland) Luca Schena	6	6		WC	(Switzerland) Luca Schena	3	1
					5	(Spain) Guillermo Alcaide	6	6

=== Third qualifier ===
First Round				Second Round				Qualifying Competition
				3	(Austria) Martin Fischer	6	6
WC	(Switzerland) Jens Hauser	3	2		(France) Hugo Nys	0	1
	(France) Hugo Nys	6	6					3	(Austria) Martin Fischer	6	6
	(Netherlands) Rogier Wassen	3	1					7	(France) Florian Reynet	3	4
	(Germany) Philipp Marx	6	6		(Germany) Philipp Marx	4	0
				7	(France) Florian Reynet	6	6

=== Fourth qualifier ===
First Round				Second Round				Qualifying Competition
				4	(Australia) Peter Luczak	6	6
	(Chile) Júlio Peralta	3	3		(Switzerland) George Bastl	2	3
	(Switzerland) George Bastl	6	6					4	(Australia) Peter Luczak	6	6
	(Czech Republic) Martin Přikryl	6	6					8	(Czech Republic) Roman Vögeli	4	2
WC	(France) Robert Quentin	4	3		(Czech Republic) Martin Přikryl	1	0
				8	(Czech Republic) Roman Vögeli	6	6
