= 1994 Suisse Open Gstaad – Doubles =

Doubles
- 1994 Suisse Open Gstaad

Final
- Champions: (Spain) Sergio Casal (Spain) Emilio Sánchez
- Runners-up: (Netherlands) Menno Oosting (Czech Republic) Daniel Vacek
- Score: 7–6, 6–4

Details
- Draw: 16
- Seeds: 4

Events
Singles	Doubles
- Swiss Open

Cédric Pioline and Marc Rosset were the defending champions, but Pioline did not compete this year in order to focus on the singles tournament. Rosset teamed up with Andrei Medvedev and were forced to withdraw before their quarterfinal match.

Sergio Casal and Emilio Sánchez won the title by defeating Menno Oosting and Daniel Vacek 7–6, 6–4 in the final.

== Seeds ==
1. (Russia) Yevgeny Kafelnikov / (Spain) Javier Sánchez (semifinals)
2. (Netherlands) Hendrik Jan Davids / (South Africa) Piet Norval (first round)
3. (Netherlands) Menno Oosting / (Czech Republic) Daniel Vacek (final)
4. (Spain) Sergio Casal / (Spain) Emilio Sánchez (champions)

== Draw ==
Key

- Q = Qualifier
- WC = Wild card
- LL = Lucky loser
- Alt = Alternate
- ITF = ITF entry
- PR = Protected ranking
- SR = Special ranking
- SE = Special exempt
- JE = Junior exempt
- JR = Junior Accelerator Programme entrant
- CO = College Accelerator Programme entrant
- NG = Next Gen Accelerator Program entrant
- w/o = Walkover
- r = Retired
- d = Defaulted

=== Draw ===
First round
1	(Russia) Y Kafelnikov (Spain) J Sánchez	6	7
Q	(Czech Republic) P Pála (Netherlands) M Schapers	2	5
(United States) M Bauer (United States) F Montana	6	7
WC	(Switzerland) L Manta (Chile) M Ríos	2	5
4	(Spain) S Casal (Spain) E Sánchez	5	6	6
(Germany) MK Goellner (Czech Republic) K Nováček	7	3	4
(Argentina) J Garat (Belgium) L Pimek	6	6	7
WC	(Israel) A Mansdorf (United States) P McEnroe	7	1	5
(Czech Republic) V Flégl (Australia) A Florent	6	3	2
(Mexico) J Lozano (Argentina) R Saad	1	6	6
(Italy) D Nargiso (West Germany) U Riglewski	3	6	2
3	(Netherlands) M Oosting (Czech Republic) D Vacek	6	3	6
(Australia) J Eagle (Australia) P Rafter	3	6	6
(Latvia) Ģ Dzelde (Italy) F Mordegan	6	3	7
WC	(Ukraine) A Medvedev (Switzerland) M Rosset	6	7
2	(Netherlands) HJ Davids (South Africa) P Norval	2	6

Quarterfinals
1	(Russia) Y Kafelnikov (Spain) J Sánchez	6	6	6
(United States) M Bauer (United States) F Montana	7	2	2
4	(Spain) S Casal (Spain) E Sánchez	6	6
(Argentina) J Garat (Belgium) L Pimek	3	3
(Mexico) J Lozano (Argentina) R Saad	6	3
3	(Netherlands) M Oosting (Czech Republic) D Vacek	7	6
(Latvia) Ģ Dzelde (Italy) F Mordegan	w/o
WC	(Ukraine) A Medvedev (Switzerland) M Rosset

Semifinals
1	(Russia) Y Kafelnikov (Spain) J Sánchez	6	4	4
4	(Spain) S Casal (Spain) E Sánchez	3	6	6
3	(Netherlands) M Oosting (Czech Republic) D Vacek	6	7	6
(Latvia) Ģ Dzelde (Italy) F Mordegan	7	6	3

Final
4	(Spain) S Casal (Spain) E Sánchez	7	6
3	(Netherlands) M Oosting (Czech Republic) D Vacek	6	4
