= 2016 Swiss Open Gstaad =

- Date: 18 – 24 July
- Edition: 49th
- Category: ATP World Tour 250 Series
- Draw: 28S/16D
- Prize money: €463,520
- Surface: Clay
- Location: Gstaad, Switzerland
- Venue: Roy Emerson Arena

Champions

Singles
- (Spain) Feliciano López

Doubles
- (Chile) Julio Peralta / (Argentina) Horacio Zeballos
- Swiss Open Gstaad

The 2016 Swiss Open Gstaad (also known as the 2016 J. Safra Sarasin Swiss Open Gstaad for sponsorship reasons) was a men's tennis tournament played on outdoor clay courts. It was the 49th edition of the Swiss Open, and part of the ATP World Tour 250 Series of the 2016 ATP World Tour. It took place at the Roy Emerson Arena in Gstaad, Switzerland, from 18 July through 24 July 2016. First-seeded Feliciano López wont the singles title.

== Finals ==
=== Singles ===
- (Spain) Feliciano López defeated (Netherlands) Robin Haase, 6–4, 7–5

=== Doubles ===
- (Chile) Julio Peralta / (Argentina) Horacio Zeballos defeated (Croatia) Mate Pavić / (New Zealand) Michael Venus, 7–6^{(7–2)}, 6–2

== Singles main draw entrants ==
=== Seeds ===
Country	Player	Rank^{1}	Seed
ESP	Feliciano López	20	1
FRA	Gilles Simon	28	2
ESP	Albert Ramos-Viñolas	35	3
BRA	Thomaz Bellucci	49	4
ARG	Guido Pella	51	5
~~ESP~~	~~Fernando Verdasco~~	~~59~~	~~6~~
RUS	Mikhail Youzhny	63	7
FRA	Paul-Henri Mathieu	66	8

- ^{1} Rankings are as of July 11, 2016

=== Other entrants ===
The following players received wildcards into the singles main draw:

- (Switzerland) Antoine Bellier
- (Switzerland) Henri Laaksonen
- (Switzerland) Johan Nikles

The following players received entry from the qualifying draw:

- (France) Tristan Lamasine
- (Switzerland) Yann Marti
- (Czech Republic) Jan Mertl
- (Brazil) Thiago Monteiro

The following player received entry as a lucky loser:

- (Argentina) Agustín Velotti

=== Withdrawals ===
Before the tournament

- (Colombia) Santiago Giraldo →replaced by (Switzerland) Marco Chiudinelli

=== Retirements ===
- (Uzbekistan) Denis Istomin

== Doubles main draw entrants ==
=== Seeds ===
Country	Player	Country	Player	Rank^{1}	Seed
CRO	Mate Pavić	NZL	Michael Venus	77	1
PAK	Aisam-ul-Haq Qureshi	BRA	André Sá	94	2
GBR	Dominic Inglot	UZB	Denis Istomin	130	3
CHI	Julio Peralta	ARG	Horacio Zeballos	137	4

- Rankings are as of July 11, 2016

=== Other entrants ===
The following pairs received wildcards into the doubles main draw:

- (Germany) Andre Begemann / (Netherlands) Robin Haase
- (Switzerland) Antoine Bellier / (Switzerland) Henri Laaksonen
