= 2014 Crédit Agricole Suisse Open Gstaad =

- Date: 21–27 July
- Edition: 47th
- Category: ATP World Tour 250 Series
- Draw: 28S / 16D
- Prize money: €426,605
- Surface: Clay / outdoor
- Location: Gstaad, Switzerland
- Venue: Roy Emerson Arena

Champions

Singles
- (Spain) Pablo Andújar

Doubles
- (Germany) Andre Begemann / (Netherlands) Robin Haase
- Swiss Open

The 2014 Crédit Agricole Suisse Open Gstaad was a men's tennis tournament played on outdoor clay courts. It was the 47th edition of the Swiss Open, and was part of the ATP World Tour 250 Series of the 2014 ATP World Tour. It took place at the Roy Emerson Arena in Gstaad, Switzerland, from 21 July through 27 July 2014. Unseeded Pablo Andújar won the singles title.

== Final ==
=== Singles ===
- (Spain) Pablo Andújar defeated (Argentina) Juan Mónaco, 6–3, 7–5

=== Doubles ===
- (Germany) Andre Begemann / (Netherlands) Robin Haase defeated (Australia) Rameez Junaid / (Slovakia) Michal Mertiňák, 6–3, 6–4

== Singles main draw entrants ==
=== Seeds ===
Country	Player	Rank^{1}	Seed
RUS	Mikhail Youzhny	19	1
ESP	Marcel Granollers	28	2
ESP	Guillermo García-López	31	3
ESP	Fernando Verdasco	33	4
ARG	Federico Delbonis	36	5
FRA	Gilles Simon	38	6
NED	Robin Haase	51	7
AUT	Dominic Thiem	55	8

- ^{1} Rankings are as of July 14, 2014

=== Other entrants ===
The following players received wildcards into the singles main draw:

- (Switzerland) Henri Laaksonen
- (Switzerland) Yann Marti
- (Serbia) Viktor Troicki

The following players received entry from the qualifying draw:

- (Spain) Iñigo Cervantes
- (Brazil) Fabiano de Paula
- (Austria) Gerald Melzer
- (France) Gianni Mina

=== Withdrawals ===
Before the tournament

- (Spain) Nicolás Almagro
- (Spain) Roberto Bautista Agut
- (Poland) Łukasz Kubot
- (Spain) Feliciano López
- (France) Stéphane Robert
- (Switzerland) Stan Wawrinka

=== Retirements ===
- (Austria) Andreas Haider-Maurer
- (France) Gilles Simon

== Doubles main draw entrants ==
=== Seeds ===
Country	Player	Country	Player	Rank^{1}	Seed
GBR	Jamie Murray	AUS	John Peers	55	1
CRO	Marin Draganja	ROU	Florin Mergea	79	2
GER	Andre Begemann	NED	Robin Haase	114	3
SWE	Johan Brunström	USA	Nicholas Monroe	126	4

- Rankings are as of July 14, 2014

=== Other entrants ===
The following pairs received wildcards into the doubles main draw:

- (Switzerland) Adrien Bossel / (Switzerland) Michael Lammer
- (Switzerland) Henri Laaksonen / (Switzerland) Yann Marti
