= 2005 Allianz Suisse Open Gstaad =

- Date: 4–10 July
- Edition: 60th
- Category: International Series
- Draw: 32S / 16D
- Prize money: $470,000
- Surface: Clay / outdoor
- Location: Gstaad, Switzerland
- Venue: Roy Emerson Arena

Champions

Singles
- (Argentina) Gastón Gaudio

Doubles
- (Czech Republic) František Čermák / (Czech Republic) Leoš Friedl
- Swiss Open

The 2005 Allianz Suisse Open Gstaad was a men's tennis tournament played on outdoor clay courts at the Roy Emerson Arena in Gstaad in Switzerland and was part of the International Series of the 2005 ATP Tour. It was the 60th edition of the tournament and was held from July 4 through July 10, 2004. Second-seeded Gastón Gaudio won the singles title.

== Finals ==
=== Singles ===
(Argentina) Gastón Gaudio defeated (Switzerland) Stanislas Wawrinka 6–4, 6–4

- It was Gaudio's 4th title of the year and the 7th of his career.

=== Doubles ===
(Czech Republic) František Čermák / (Czech Republic) Leoš Friedl defeated (Germany) Michael Kohlmann / (Germany) Rainer Schüttler 7–6^{(8–6)}, 7–6^{(13–11)}

- It was Čermák's 5th title of the year and the 10th of his career. It was Friedl's 5th title of the year and the 10th of his career.
