= 2015 Swiss Open Gstaad =

- Date: 27 July – 2 August
- Edition: 48th
- Category: ATP World Tour 250 Series
- Draw: 28S/16D
- Prize money: €494,310
- Surface: Clay
- Location: Gstaad, Switzerland
- Venue: Roy Emerson Arena

Champions

Singles
- (Austria) Dominic Thiem

Doubles
- (Belarus) Aliaksandr Bury / (Uzbekistan) Denis Istomin
- Swiss Open Gstaad

The 2015 Swiss Open Gstaad presented by Visilab was a men's tennis tournament played on outdoor clay courts. It was the 48th edition of the Swiss Open, and part of the ATP World Tour 250 Series of the 2015 ATP World Tour. It took place at the Roy Emerson Arena in Gstaad, Switzerland, from 27 July through 2 August 2015. Third-seeded Dominic Thiem won the singles title.

== Finals ==
=== Singles ===
- (Austria) Dominic Thiem defeated (Belgium) David Goffin, 7–5, 6–2

=== Doubles ===
- (Belarus) Aliaksandr Bury / (Uzbekistan) Denis Istomin defeated (Austria) Oliver Marach / (Pakistan) Aisam-ul-Haq Qureshi, 3–6, 6–2, [10–5]

== Singles main draw entrants ==
=== Seeds ===
Country	Player	Rank^{1}	Seed
BEL	David Goffin	14	1
ESP	Feliciano López	19	2
AUT	Dominic Thiem	26	3
ESP	Pablo Andújar	35	4
BRA	Thomaz Bellucci	41	5
POR	João Sousa	51	6
ESP	Pablo Carreño Busta	56	7
COL	Santiago Giraldo	59	8

- ^{1} Rankings are as of July 20, 2015

=== Other entrants ===
The following players received wildcards into the singles main draw:

- (Switzerland) Marco Chiudinelli
- (Switzerland) Henri Laaksonen
- (Russia) Andrey Rublev

The following players received entry from the qualifying draw:

- (France) Calvin Hemery
- (Germany) Julian Reister
- (France) Maxime Teixeira
- (Argentina) Horacio Zeballos

=== Withdrawals ===
Before the tournament

- (Switzerland) Stan Wawrinka →replaced by Kimmer Coppejans

=== Retirements ===
- (Slovenia) Blaž Kavčič

== Doubles main draw entrants ==
=== Seeds ===
Country	Player	Country	Player	Rank^{1}	Seed
ESP	Marcel Granollers	ESP	Marc López	29	1
POL	Mariusz Fyrstenberg	MEX	Santiago González	99	2
AUT	Oliver Marach	PAK	Aisam-ul-Haq Qureshi	105	3
AUT	Julian Knowle	AUT	Philipp Oswald	119	4

- Rankings are as of July 20, 2015

=== Other entrants ===
The following pairs received wildcards into the doubles main draw:

- (Switzerland) Adrien Bossel / (Switzerland) Marco Chiudinelli
- (Switzerland) Henri Laaksonen / (Switzerland) Luca Margaroli
