= 2017 Swiss Open Gstaad – Doubles =

Doubles
- 2017 Swiss Open Gstaad

Final
- Champions: (Austria) Oliver Marach (Austria) Philipp Oswald
- Runners-up: (France) Jonathan Eysseric (Croatia) Franko Škugor
- Score: 6–3, 4–6, [10–8]

Details
- Draw: 16
- Seeds: 4

Events
Singles	Doubles
- Swiss Open Gstaad

Julio Peralta and Horacio Zeballos were the defending champions, but chose to compete in Hamburg instead.

Oliver Marach and Philipp Oswald won the title, defeating Jonathan Eysseric and Franko Škugor in the final, 6–3, 4–6, [10–8].

== Seeds ==
1. (New Zealand) Marcus Daniell / (Brazil) Marcelo Demoliner (first round)
2. (Austria) Oliver Marach / (Austria) Philipp Oswald (champions)
3. (Czech Republic) Roman Jebavý / (Netherlands) Matwé Middelkoop (semifinals)
4. (France) Jonathan Eysseric / (Croatia) Franko Škugor (final)

== Draw ==
Key

- Q = Qualifier
- WC = Wild card
- LL = Lucky loser
- Alt = Alternate
- ITF = ITF entry
- PR = Protected ranking
- SR = Special ranking
- SE = Special exempt
- JE = Junior exempt
- JR = Junior Accelerator Programme entrant
- CO = College Accelerator Programme entrant
- NG = Next Gen Accelerator Program entrant
- w/o = Walkover
- r = Retired
- d = Defaulted

=== Draw ===
First round
1	(New Zealand) M Daniell (Brazil) M Demoliner	4	6^{8}
(Slovakia) N Gombos (Portugal) J Sousa	6	7^{10}
(Netherlands) S Arends (Netherlands) R Haase	6	6^{2}	[13]
(Russia) M Elgin (Uzbekistan) D Istomin	4	7^{7}	[11]
4	(France) J Eysseric (Croatia) F Škugor	6	6
WC	(Switzerland) A Bellier (Switzerland) L Margaroli	3	2
(India) L Paes (Croatia) A Šančić	3	2
(Brazil) T Bellucci (Brazil) A Sá	6	6
(Chile) H Podlipnik-Castillo (Belarus) A Vasilevski	6	6
(Argentina) F Bagnis (Japan) T Daniel	2	2
WC	(Germany) D Brown (Switzerland) M Chiudinelli	2	1
3	(Czech Republic) R Jebavý (Netherlands) M Middelkoop	6	6
(Serbia) D Lajović (Croatia) D Marcan	6	6
(United States) J Cerretani (United States) M Schnur	4	4
(Argentina) G Durán (Israel) J Erlich	3	6	[4]
2	(Austria) O Marach (Austria) P Oswald	6	2	[10]

Quarterfinals
(Slovakia) N Gombos (Portugal) J Sousa	6	1	[1]
(Netherlands) S Arends (Netherlands) R Haase	3	6	[10]
4	(France) J Eysseric (Croatia) F Škugor	6	6
(Brazil) T Bellucci (Brazil) A Sá	2	4
(Chile) H Podlipnik-Castillo (Belarus) A Vasilevski	6	3	[8]
3	(Czech Republic) R Jebavý (Netherlands) M Middelkoop	2	6	[10]
(Serbia) D Lajović (Croatia) D Marcan	6^{3}	4
2	(Austria) O Marach (Austria) P Oswald	7^{7}	6

Semifinals
(Netherlands) S Arends (Netherlands) R Haase	3	4
4	(France) J Eysseric (Croatia) F Škugor	6	6
3	(Czech Republic) R Jebavý (Netherlands) M Middelkoop	3	3
2	(Austria) O Marach (Austria) P Oswald	6	6

Final
4	(France) J Eysseric (Croatia) F Škugor	3	6	[8]
2	(Austria) O Marach (Austria) P Oswald	6	4	[10]
