= 2010 Allianz Suisse Open Gstaad – Doubles =

Doubles
- 2010 Allianz Suisse Open Gstaad

Final
- Champions: (Sweden) Johan Brunström (Finland) Jarkko Nieminen
- Runners-up: (Brazil) Marcelo Melo (Brazil) Bruno Soares
- Score: 6–3, 6–7^{(4–7)}, [11–9]

Details
- Draw: 16
- Seeds: 4

Events
Singles	Doubles
- Swiss Open

Marco Chiudinelli and Michael Lammer were the defending champions, but they were eliminated by Wesley Moodie and Dick Norman already in the first round.
Unseeded Johan Brunström and Jarkko Nieminen won in the final 6–3, 6–7^{(4–7)}, [11–9], against 4th-seeded Marcelo Melo and Bruno Soares.

== Seeds ==
1. (South Africa) Wesley Moodie / (Belgium) Dick Norman (semifinals)
2. (Spain) Marcel Granollers / (Spain) Marc López (quarterfinals)
3. (Sweden) Simon Aspelin / (Australia) Paul Hanley (first round)
4. (Brazil) Marcelo Melo / (Brazil) Bruno Soares (final)

== Draw ==
Key

- Q = Qualifier
- WC = Wild card
- LL = Lucky loser
- Alt = Alternate
- ITF = ITF entry
- PR = Protected ranking
- SR = Special ranking
- SE = Special exempt
- JE = Junior exempt
- JR = Junior Accelerator Programme entrant
- CO = College Accelerator Programme entrant
- NG = Next Gen Accelerator Program entrant
- w/o = Walkover
- r = Retired
- d = Defaulted

=== Draw ===
First round
1	(South Africa) W Moodie (Belgium) D Norman	7^{7}	7
WC	(Switzerland) M Chiudinelli (Switzerland) M Lammer	6^{2}	5
(Kazakhstan) A Golubev (Uzbekistan) D Istomin	3	4
(Portugal) F Gil (France) F Serra	6	6
3	(Sweden) S Aspelin (Australia) P Hanley	7	3	[8]
(Switzerland) Y Allegro (Germany) C Kas	5	6	[10]
(Sweden) J Brunström (Finland) J Nieminen	4	6	[10]
(Spain) D Gimeno-Traver (Spain) A Montañés	6	3	[5]
(France) J Chardy (France) P-H Mathieu	6	6
(Spain) N Almagro (Spain) P Riba	3	1
(Brazil) T Bellucci (Brazil) F Ferreiro	6	4	[7]
4	(Brazil) M Melo (Brazil) B Soares	3	6	[10]
WC	(Switzerland) G Bastl (Jamaica) D Brown	2	6	[10]
(Russia) I Andreev (Russia) M Youzhny	6	4	[3]
(Germany) A Beck (Austria) P Oswald	6^{3}	5
2	(Spain) M Granollers (Spain) M López	7^{7}	7

Quarterfinals
1	(South Africa) W Moodie (Belgium) D Norman	6	6
(Portugal) F Gil (France) F Serra	4	3
(Switzerland) Y Allegro (Germany) C Kas	4	2
(Sweden) J Brunström (Finland) J Nieminen	6	6
(France) J Chardy (France) P-H Mathieu	1	6^{5}
4	(Brazil) M Melo (Brazil) B Soares	6	7^{7}
WC	(Switzerland) G Bastl (Jamaica) D Brown	6	1	[10]
2	(Spain) M Granollers (Spain) M López	3	6	[8]

Semifinals
1	(South Africa) W Moodie (Belgium) D Norman	5	6	[8]
(Sweden) J Brunström (Finland) J Nieminen	7	4	[10]
4	(Brazil) M Melo (Brazil) B Soares	4	6	[10]
WC	(Switzerland) G Bastl (Jamaica) D Brown	6	3	[6]

Finals
(Sweden) J Brunström (Finland) J Nieminen	6	6^{4}	[11]
4	(Brazil) M Melo (Brazil) B Soares	3	7^{7}	[9]
