= 2016 Swiss Open Gstaad – Singles =

Singles
- 2016 Swiss Open Gstaad

Final
- Champion: (Spain) Feliciano López
- Runner-up: (Netherlands) Robin Haase
- Score: 6–4, 7–5

Details
- Draw: 28
- Seeds: 4

Events
Singles	Doubles
- Swiss Open Gstaad

Dominic Thiem was the defending champion, but chose to compete in Kitzbühel instead.

Feliciano López won the title, defeating Robin Haase in the final, 6–4, 7–5.

== Seeds ==
The top four seeds receive a bye into the second round.

1. (Spain) Feliciano López (champion)
2. (France) Gilles Simon (second round)
3. (Spain) Albert Ramos Viñolas (quarterfinals)
4. (Brazil) Thomaz Bellucci (second round)
5. (Argentina) Guido Pella (first round)
6. (Spain) Fernando Verdasco (withdrew)
7. (Russia) Mikhail Youzhny (quarterfinals)
8. (France) Paul-Henri Mathieu (semifinals)

== Draw ==
Key

- Q = Qualifier
- WC = Wild card
- LL = Lucky loser
- Alt = Alternate
- ITF = ITF entry
- PR = Protected ranking
- SR = Special ranking
- SE = Special exempt
- JE = Junior exempt
- JR = Junior Accelerator Programme entrant
- CO = College Accelerator Programme entrant
- NG = Next Gen Accelerator Program entrant
- w/o = Walkover
- r = Retired
- d = Defaulted

=== Finals ===
Semifinals
1	(Spain) Feliciano López	4	6	6
(Germany) Dustin Brown	6	3	3
8	(France) Paul-Henri Mathieu	6^{5}	6^{2}
(Netherlands) Robin Haase	7^{7}	7^{7}

Final
1	(Spain) Feliciano López	6	7
(Netherlands) Robin Haase	4	5

=== Top half ===
First round
Q	(Switzerland) Y Marti	4	7^{7}	2
Q	(Czech Republic) J Mertl	6	6^{5}	6
(Sweden) E Ymer	2	7^{9}	7
(Germany) D Brands	6	6^{7}	5
(Russia) K Kravchuk	6^{5}	7^{7}	7^{9}
5	(Argentina) G Pella	7^{7}	6^{4}	6^{7}
(Germany) D Brown	6	7
(Argentina) J Mónaco	2	5
(Bosnia and Herzegovina) M Bašić	4
(Uzbekistan) D Istomin	2^{r}
WC	(Switzerland) J Nikles	3	2
7	(Russia) M Youzhny	6	6

Second round
1	(Spain) F López	7^{7}	6
Q	(Czech Republic) J Mertl	6^{4}	4
(Sweden) E Ymer	2	7^{7}	7
(Russia) K Kravchuk	6	6^{5}	5
4	(Brazil) T Bellucci	6	6^{4}	1
(Germany) D Brown	2	7^{7}	6
(Bosnia and Herzegovina) M Bašić	5	7	3
7	(Russia) M Youzhny	7	5	6

Quarterfinals
1	(Spain) F López	6	7^{7}
(Sweden) E Ymer	4	6^{2}
(Germany) D Brown	6	6
7	(Russia) M Youzhny	4	4

Semifinals
1	(Spain) F López	4	6	6
(Germany) D Brown	6	3	3

=== Bottom half ===
First round
8	(France) P-H Mathieu	7	6
(Switzerland) M Chiudinelli	5	1
(Slovakia) J Kovalík	6	1	6^{5}
WC	(Switzerland) H Laaksonen	3	6	7^{7}
Q	(France) T Lamasine	6	6
(Moldova) R Albot	4	2
LL	(Argentina) A Velotti	4	2
(Argentina) H Zeballos	6	6
(Netherlands) R Haase	6^{4}	6	6
(Netherlands) T de Bakker	7^{7}	3	1
Q	(Brazil) T Monteiro	6	7
WC	(Switzerland) A Bellier	3	5

Second round
8	(France) P-H Mathieu	6	6
WC	(Switzerland) H Laaksonen	1	4
Q	(France) T Lamasine	4	2
3	(Spain) A Ramos Viñolas	6	6
(Argentina) H Zeballos	6^{5}	4
(Netherlands) R Haase	7^{7}	6
Q	(Brazil) T Monteiro	6	6
2	(France) G Simon	2	4

Quarterfinals
8	(France) P-H Mathieu	4	6	6
3	(Spain) A Ramos Viñolas	6	3	4
(Netherlands) R Haase	7^{7}	7
Q	(Brazil) T Monteiro	6^{2}	5

Semifinals
8	(France) P-H Mathieu	6^{5}	6^{2}
(Netherlands) R Haase	7^{7}	7^{7}

== Qualifying ==
=== Seeds ===
The top seed received a bye into the qualifying competition.

1. (Brazil) Thiago Monteiro (qualified)
2. (Argentina) Marco Trungelliti (first round)
3. (Argentina) Nicolás Kicker (first round)
4. (France) Tristan Lamasine (qualified)
5. (Argentina) Agustín Velotti (qualifying competition, lucky loser)
6. (Serbia) Miki Janković (first round)
7. (Argentina) Tomás Lipovšek Puches (qualifying competition)
8. (Czech Republic) Jan Mertl (qualified)

=== Qualifiers ===
1. (Brazil) Thiago Monteiro
2. (Switzerland) Yann Marti
3. (Czech Republic) Jan Mertl
4. (France) Tristan Lamasine

=== Lucky loser ===
1. (Argentina) Agustín Velotti

=== Qualifying draw ===
==== First qualifier ====
First round				Qualifying competition
				1	(Brazil) Thiago Monteiro	6	6
	(Italy) Matteo Trevisan	6	6		(Italy) Matteo Trevisan	2	1
6	(Serbia) Miki Janković	3	3

==== Second qualifier ====
First round
2	(Argentina) Marco Trungelliti	6^{2}	3
(Switzerland) Yann Marti	7^{7}	6
WC	(Switzerland) Alexander Ritschard	6^{1}	6	1
7	(Argentina) Tomás Lipovšek Puches	7^{7}	2	6

Qualifying competition
(Switzerland) Yann Marti	6	3	6
7	(Argentina) Tomás Lipovšek Puches	0	6	4

==== Third qualifier ====
First round
3	(Argentina) Nicolás Kicker	1	4
(Switzerland) Adrien Bossel	6	6
Alt	(Switzerland) Luca Margaroli	1	4
8	(Czech Republic) Jan Mertl	6	6

Qualifying competition
(Switzerland) Adrien Bossel	1	3
8	(Czech Republic) Jan Mertl	6	6

==== Fourth qualifier ====
First round
4	(France) Tristan Lamasine	2	6	7^{7}
(Italy) Marco Bortolotti	6	3	6^{3}
WC	(Switzerland) Siméon Rossier	1	3
5	(Argentina) Agustín Velotti	6	6

Qualifying competition
4	(France) Tristan Lamasine	7	7
5	(Argentina) Agustín Velotti	5	5
