= 2014 Crédit Agricole Suisse Open Gstaad – Singles =

Singles
- 2014 Crédit Agricole Suisse Open Gstaad

Final
- Champion: (Spain) Pablo Andújar
- Runner-up: (Argentina) Juan Mónaco
- Score: 6–3, 7–5

Details
- Draw: 28
- Seeds: 8

Events
Singles	Doubles
- Swiss Open

Mikhail Youzhny was the defending champion, but lost to Robin Haase in the quarterfinals.
Pablo Andújar won the title, defeating Juan Mónaco in the final, 6–3, 7–5.

== Seeds ==
The top four seeds receive a bye into the second round.

1. (Russia) Mikhail Youzhny (quarterfinals)
2. (Spain) Marcel Granollers (quarterfinals)
3. (Spain) Guillermo García López (second round)
4. (Spain) Fernando Verdasco (semifinals)
5. (Argentina) Federico Delbonis (second round)
6. (France) Gilles Simon (first round, retired)
7. (Netherlands) Robin Haase (semifinals)
8. (Austria) Dominic Thiem (first round)

== Draw ==
Key

- Q = Qualifier
- WC = Wild card
- LL = Lucky loser
- Alt = Alternate
- ITF = ITF entry
- PR = Protected ranking
- SR = Special ranking
- SE = Special exempt
- JE = Junior exempt
- JR = Junior Accelerator Programme entrant
- CO = College Accelerator Programme entrant
- NG = Next Gen Accelerator Program entrant
- w/o = Walkover
- r = Retired
- d = Defaulted

=== Finals ===
Semifinals
7	(Netherlands) Robin Haase	3	6^{4}
(Argentina) Juan Mónaco	6	7^{7}
4	(Spain) Fernando Verdasco	3	7^{7}	1
(Spain) Pablo Andújar	6	6^{2}	6

Final
(Argentina) Juan Mónaco	3	5
(Spain) Pablo Andújar	6	7

=== Top half ===
First round
(Italy) F Volandri	3	6^{3}
(France) K de Schepper	6	7^{7}
Q	(France) G Mina	6^{5}	6^{3}
WC	(Switzerland) H Laaksonen	7^{7}	7^{7}
(Kazakhstan) A Nedovyesov	4	7^{7}	3
7	(Netherlands) R Haase	6	6^{3}	6
(Argentina) J Mónaco	6	7
(Romania) V Hănescu	4	5
Q	(Austria) G Melzer	3	4
(Brazil) T Bellucci	6	6
(Germany) D Brown	3	3
5	(Argentina) F Delbonis	6	6

Second round
1	(Russia) M Youzhny	6	6
(France) K de Schepper	3	4
WC	(Switzerland) H Laaksonen	4	6	5
7	(Netherlands) R Haase	6	1	7
3	(Spain) G García López	2	6	4
(Argentina) J Mónaco	6	2	6
(Brazil) T Bellucci	6	6
5	(Argentina) F Delbonis	4	4

Quarterfinals
1	(Russia) M Youzhny	6	1	4
7	(Netherlands) R Haase	3	6	6
(Argentina) J Mónaco	7^{7}	6
(Brazil) T Bellucci	6^{1}	1

Semifinals
7	(Netherlands) R Haase	3	6^{4}
(Argentina) J Mónaco	6	7^{7}

=== Bottom half ===
First round
8	(Austria) D Thiem	6^{4}	4
WC	(Serbia) V Troicki	7^{7}	6
(Kazakhstan) A Golubev	3	6	7^{7}
Q	(Spain) I Cervantes	6	3	6^{4}
(Germany) J-L Struff	6	1
(Austria) A Haider-Maurer	2	0^{r}
6	(France) G Simon	2	2^{r}
(Spain) P Andújar	6	3
(Slovenia) B Rola	6	6
Q	(Brazil) F de Paula	4	4
(Spain) D Gimeno Traver	7	6^{7}	6^{5}
WC	(Switzerland) Y Marti	5	7^{9}	7^{7}

Second round
WC	(Serbia) V Troicki	6	6
(Kazakhstan) A Golubev	3	4
(Germany) J-L Struff	6	3	6^{3}
4	(Spain) F Verdasco	3	6	7^{7}
(Spain) P Andújar	6	6
(Slovenia) B Rola	3	3
WC	(Switzerland) Y Marti	1	4
2	(Spain) M Granollers	6	6

Quarterfinals
WC	(Serbia) V Troicki	4	7^{9}	1
4	(Spain) F Verdasco	6	6^{7}	6
(Spain) P Andújar	7	6
2	(Spain) M Granollers	5	3

Semifinals
4	(Spain) F Verdasco	3	7^{7}	1
(Spain) P Andújar	6	6^{2}	6

== Qualifying ==
=== Seeds ===
1. (Spain) Albert Ramos Viñolas (withdrew, received entry into main draw in Umag)
2. (Argentina) Facundo Bagnis (first round)
3. (Austria) Gerald Melzer (qualified)
4. (Italy) Matteo Viola (qualifying competition)
5. (France) Grégoire Burquier (first round)
6. (Australia) Alex Bolt (second round)
7. (Greece) Theodoros Angelinos (qualifying competition)
8. (France) Tristan Lamasine (second round)

=== Qualifiers ===
1. (Brazil) Fabiano de Paula
2. (France) Gianni Mina
3. (Austria) Gerald Melzer
4. (Spain) Íñigo Cervantes

=== Qualifying draw ===
==== First qualifier ====
First round
Alt	(France) Quentin Robert	1	3
(Brazil) Fabiano de Paula	6	6
(Switzerland) Adrien Bossel	4	6	5
(Bolivia) Federico Zeballos	6	1	7
(Switzerland) Siméon Rossier	6^{7}	4
WC	(France) Thierry Roggi	7^{9}	6
WC	(Switzerland) Alexander Sadecky	6	6
5	(France) Grégoire Burquier	4	2

Second round
(Brazil) Fabiano de Paula	7^{7}	3	6
(Bolivia) Federico Zeballos	6^{5}	6	3
WC	(France) Thierry Roggi	4	4
WC	(Switzerland) Alexander Sadecky	6	6

Qualifying competition
(Brazil) Fabiano de Paula	6	6
WC	(Switzerland) Alexander Sadecky	4	4

==== Second qualifier ====
First round
2	(Argentina) Facundo Bagnis	4	5
WC	(Switzerland) Jessy Kalambay	6	7
(Germany) Mats Moraing	3	7^{7}	3
(Chile) Cristian Garín	6	6^{2}	6
(Ukraine) Gleb Alekseenko	1	2
(France) Gianni Mina	6	6
(Switzerland) Loïc Perret	5	3
8	(France) Tristan Lamasine	7	6

Second round
WC	(Switzerland) Jessy Kalambay	4	2
(Chile) Cristian Garín	6	6
(France) Gianni Mina	4	7	6
8	(France) Tristan Lamasine	6	5	3

Qualifying competition
(Chile) Cristian Garín	3	6	3
(France) Gianni Mina	6	3	6

==== Third qualifier ====
First round
3	(Austria) Gerald Melzer	6	6
(Ukraine) Vadim Alekseenko	0	0
(Spain) Juan Lizariturry	3	6	3
(France) Julien Obry	6	1	6
(Bolivia) Alejandro Mendoza	4	2
(France) Constant Lestienne	6	6
(Germany) Robin Kern	6	3	6^{4}
7	(Greece) Theodoros Angelinos	1	6	7^{7}

Second round
3	(Austria) Gerald Melzer	7	7
(France) Julien Obry	5	5
(France) Constant Lestienne	2	5
7	(Greece) Theodoros Angelinos	6	7

Qualifying competition
3	(Austria) Gerald Melzer	6^{5}	6	6
7	(Greece) Theodoros Angelinos	7^{7}	2	1

==== Fourth qualifier ====
First round
4	(Italy) Matteo Viola	7^{7}	6^{5}	6
(Argentina) Eduardo Schwank	6^{5}	7^{7}	1
(Switzerland) Michael Lammer	7^{7}	6
(France) Florent Serra	6^{4}	4
WC	(Switzerland) Daniel Valent	3	2
(Spain) Íñigo Cervantes	6	6
(Portugal) Frederico Gil	3	2
6	(Australia) Alex Bolt	6	6

Second round
4	(Italy) Matteo Viola	6	6
(Switzerland) Michael Lammer	1	3
(Spain) Íñigo Cervantes	6	6
6	(Australia) Alex Bolt	2	4

Qualifying competition
4	(Italy) Matteo Viola	3	3
(Spain) Íñigo Cervantes	6	6
