= 2011 Crédit Agricole Suisse Open Gstaad – Doubles =

Doubles
- 2011 Crédit Agricole Suisse Open Gstaad

Final
- Champion: (Czech Republic) František Čermák (Slovakia) Filip Polášek
- Runner-up: (Germany) Christopher Kas (Austria) Alexander Peya
- Score: 6–3, 7–6^{(9–7)}

Details
- Draw: 16
- Seeds: 4

Events
Singles	Doubles
- Swiss Open

Johan Brunström and Jarkko Nieminen were the defending champions, but Nieminen decided not to participate.
Brunström played alongside Adil Shamasdin, but they were eliminated in the semifinals by Kas and Peya.

No.1 seeds František Čermák and Filip Polášek won the title beating No.2 seeds Christopher Kas and Alexander Peya in the final, 6–3, 7–6^{(9–7)}.

== Seeds ==
1. (Czech Republic) František Čermák / (Slovakia) Filip Polášek (champions)
2. (Germany) Christopher Kas / (Austria) Alexander Peya (final)
3. (United States) James Cerretani / (Germany) Philipp Marx (first round)
4. (Sweden) Johan Brunström / (Canada) Adil Shamasdin (semifinals)

== Draw ==
Key

- Q = Qualifier
- WC = Wild card
- LL = Lucky loser
- Alt = Alternate
- ITF = ITF entry
- PR = Protected ranking
- SR = Special ranking
- SE = Special exempt
- JE = Junior exempt
- JR = Junior Accelerator Programme entrant
- CO = College Accelerator Programme entrant
- NG = Next Gen Accelerator Program entrant
- w/o = Walkover
- r = Retired
- d = Defaulted

=== Draw ===
First round
1	(Czech Republic) F Čermák (Slovakia) F Polášek	7^{7}	3	[10]
(Russia) M Elgin (Uzbekistan) D Istomin	6^{2}	6	[6]
(Colombia) S Giraldo (Brazil) J Souza	6^{6}	6	[10]
(Austria) A Haider-Maurer (Italy) A Motti	7^{8}	1	[7]
3	(United States) J Cerretani (Germany) P Marx	6	4	[9]
(Spain) G García-López (Spain) M López	2	6	[11]
(Romania) V Hănescu (Netherlands) R Wassen	5	6	[10]
(Spain) P Andújar (Spain) D Gimeno-Traver	7	4	[7]
(Poland) T Bednarek (Sweden) A Siljeström	2	6	[8]
(Austria) J Knowle (Slovakia) I Zelenay	6	4	[10]
WC	(Switzerland) G Bastl (Switzerland) A Sadecky	5	3
4	(Sweden) J Brunström (Canada) A Shamasdin	7	6
(United Kingdom) J Delgado (United Kingdom) J Marray	3	6	[4]
(Portugal) F Gil (Czech Republic) L Rosol	6	3	[10]
WC	(Switzerland) Y Allegro (Switzerland) S Bohli	0	3
2	(Germany) C Kas (Austria) A Peya	6	6

Quarterfinals
1	(Czech Republic) F Čermák (Slovakia) F Polášek	6	6
(Colombia) S Giraldo (Brazil) J Souza	3	4
(Spain) G García-López (Spain) M López	5	5
(Romania) V Hănescu (Netherlands) R Wassen	7	7
(Austria) J Knowle (Slovakia) I Zelenay	6^{4}	1
4	(Sweden) J Brunström (Canada) A Shamasdin	7	6
(Portugal) F Gil (Czech Republic) L Rosol	4	2
2	(Germany) C Kas (Austria) A Peya	6	6

Semifinals
1	(Czech Republic) F Čermák (Slovakia) F Polášek	6	6
(Romania) V Hănescu (Netherlands) R Wassen	4	3
4	(Sweden) J Brunström (Canada) A Shamasdin	4	1
2	(Germany) C Kas (Austria) A Peya	6	6

Final
1	(Czech Republic) F Čermák (Slovakia) F Polášek	6	7^{9}
2	(Germany) C Kas (Austria) A Peya	3	6^{7}
