= 2011 Crédit Agricole Suisse Open Gstaad – Singles =

Tennis match

Singles
- 2011 Crédit Agricole Suisse Open Gstaad

Final
- Champion: (Spain) Marcel Granollers
- Runner-up: (Spain) Fernando Verdasco
- Score: 6–4, 3–6, 6–3

Details
- Draw: 28
- Seeds: 8

Events
Singles	Doubles
- Swiss Open

Nicolás Almagro was the defending champion, but lost in the semifinals to Fernando Verdasco.

8th seed Marcel Granollers won the title. He defeated his compatriot, 4th seed Fernando Verdasco in the final, 6–4, 3–6, 6–3.

== Seeds ==
The first four seeds received a bye into the second round.

1. (Spain) Nicolás Almagro (semifinals)
2. (Switzerland) Stanislas Wawrinka (quarterfinals)
3. (Russia) Mikhail Youzhny (semifinals)
4. (Spain) Fernando Verdasco (final)
5. (Spain) Feliciano López (quarterfinals)
6. (Spain) Guillermo García López (first round)
7. (Spain) Pablo Andújar (first round)
8. (Spain) Marcel Granollers (champion)

== Draw ==
Key

- Q = Qualifier
- WC = Wild card
- LL = Lucky loser
- Alt = Alternate
- ITF = ITF entry
- PR = Protected ranking
- SR = Special ranking
- SE = Special exempt
- JE = Junior exempt
- JR = Junior Accelerator Programme entrant
- CO = College Accelerator Programme entrant
- NG = Next Gen Accelerator Program entrant
- w/o = Walkover
- r = Retired
- d = Defaulted

=== Finals ===
Semifinals
1	(Spain) Nicolás Almagro	7^{7}	6^{2}	3
4	(Spain) Fernando Verdasco	6^{2}	7^{7}	6
3	(Russia) Mikhail Youzhny	3	6	2
8	(Spain) Marcel Granollers	6	3	6

Final
4	(Spain) Fernando Verdasco	4	6	3
8	(Spain) Marcel Granollers	6	3	6

=== Top half ===
First round
(Romania) V Hănescu	5	2
(Finland) J Nieminen	7	6
(Belgium) S Darcis	4	7	5
(Spain) D Gimeno Traver	6	5	7
WC	(Switzerland) M Lammer	4	7^{7}	3
5	(Spain) F López	6	6^{4}	6
(Portugal) F Gil	4	6	6
Q	(Brazil) J Souza	6	3	4
(France) J Benneteau	6	6^{6}	6
(Czech Republic) L Rosol	2	7^{8}	3
(Germany) M Bachinger	6	6
7	(Spain) P Andújar	1	4

Second round
1	(Spain) N Almagro	7^{7}	6
(Finland) J Nieminen	6^{3}	3
(Spain) D Gimeno Traver	3	4
5	(Spain) F López	6	6
4	(Spain) F Verdasco	6	6
(Portugal) F Gil	3	2
(France) J Benneteau	6	6
(Germany) M Bachinger	4	4

Quarterfinals
1	(Spain) N Almagro	6	7
5	(Spain) F López	4	5
4	(Spain) F Verdasco	6	5	6
(France) J Benneteau	4	7	1

Semifinals
1	(Spain) N Almagro	7^{7}	6^{2}	3
4	(Spain) F Verdasco	6^{2}	7^{7}	6

=== Bottom half ===
First round
6	(Spain) G García López	7	2	1
(Colombia) S Giraldo	5	6	6
(Austria) A Haider-Maurer	6	6
Q	(Switzerland) Y Marti	1	4
Q	(Austria) M Fischer	3	6	4
(Uzbekistan) D Istomin	6	3	6
8	(Spain) M Granollers	6	6
WC	(Switzerland) S Bohli	1	0
(Russia) I Andreev	6	6
(Germany) M Zverev	3	2
WC	(Switzerland) A Sadecky	6	3	6^{4}
Q	(Australia) P Luczak	3	6	7^{7}

Second round
(Colombia) S Giraldo	6	2	4
(Austria) A Haider-Maurer	3	6	6
(Uzbekistan) D Istomin	3	2
3	(Russia) M Youzhny	6	6
8	(Spain) M Granollers	6	6
(Russia) I Andreev	1	3
Q	(Australia) P Luczak	3	5
2	(Switzerland) S Wawrinka	6	7

Quarterfinals
(Austria) A Haider-Maurer	4	7	4
3	(Russia) M Youzhny	6	5	6
8	(Spain) M Granollers	6	6
2	(Switzerland) S Wawrinka	3	2

Semifinals
3	(Russia) M Youzhny	3	6	2
8	(Spain) M Granollers	6	3	6
