= 2005 Allianz Suisse Open Gstaad – Doubles =

Doubles
- 2005 Allianz Suisse Open Gstaad

Final
- Champions: (Czech Republic) František Čermák (Czech Republic) Leoš Friedl
- Runners-up: (Germany) Michael Kohlmann (Germany) Rainer Schüttler
- Score: 7–6^{(8–6)}, 7–6^{(13–11)}

Details
- Draw: 16
- Seeds: 4

Events
Singles	Doubles
- Swiss Open

Leander Paes and David Rikl were the two-time defending champions, but did not participate this year. Rikl was also the three-time defending champion, having won the title with Joshua Eagle in 2002.

František Čermák and Leoš Friedl won the title, defeating Michael Kohlmann and Rainer Schüttler in the final, 7–6^{(8–6)}, 7–6^{(13–11)}.

== Seeds ==
1. (Czech Republic) Martin Damm / (Czech Republic) Radek Štěpánek (quarterfinals)
2. (Czech Republic) František Čermák / (Czech Republic) Leoš Friedl (champions)
3. (Czech Republic) Cyril Suk / (Czech Republic) Pavel Vízner (first round)
4. N/A

== Draw ==
Key

- Q = Qualifier
- WC = Wild card
- LL = Lucky loser
- Alt = Alternate
- ITF = ITF entry
- PR = Protected ranking
- SR = Special ranking
- SE = Special exempt
- JE = Junior exempt
- JR = Junior Accelerator Programme entrant
- CO = College Accelerator Programme entrant
- NG = Next Gen Accelerator Program entrant
- w/o = Walkover
- r = Retired
- d = Defaulted

=== Draw ===
First round
1	(Czech Republic) M Damm (Czech Republic) R Štěpánek	6	6
WC	(Switzerland) G Bastl (Armenia) S Sargsian	4	2
(Italy) A Seppi (Italy) F Volandri	1	2
(Germany) M Kohlmann (Germany) R Schüttler	6	6
3	(Czech Republic) C Suk (Czech Republic) P Vízner	3	2^{r}
WC	(Switzerland) I Heuberger (Switzerland) M Lammer	6	2
(Spain) Á López Morón (Spain) F Verdasco	6	7
(Argentina) M García (Peru) L Horna	4	5
(Italy) M Bertolini (Belgium) T Vanhoudt	6	6
(Italy) E Artoni (Chile) N Massú	3	3
(Brazil) R Mello (Italy) D Sanguinetti	4	3
Alt	(Germany) P Kohlschreiber (Czech Republic) T Zíb	6	6
(Czech Republic) J Novák (Czech Republic) P Pála	4	6	3
(Croatia) I Ljubičić (Italy) P Starace	6	3	6
(Switzerland) Y Allegro (Switzerland) S Wawrinka	5	6^{2}
2	(Czech Republic) F Čermák (Czech Republic) L Friedl	7	7^{7}

Quarterfinals
1	(Czech Republic) M Damm (Czech Republic) R Štěpánek	3	6^{5}
(Germany) M Kohlmann (Germany) R Schüttler	6	7^{7}
WC	(Switzerland) I Heuberger (Switzerland) M Lammer	7	6^{2}	5
(Spain) Á López Morón (Spain) F Verdasco	5	7^{7}	7
(Italy) M Bertolini (Belgium) T Vanhoudt	4	4
Alt	(Germany) P Kohlschreiber (Czech Republic) T Zíb	6	6
(Croatia) I Ljubičić (Italy) P Starace	3	3
2	(Czech Republic) F Čermák (Czech Republic) L Friedl	6	6

Semifinals
(Germany) M Kohlmann (Germany) R Schüttler	1	6	6
(Spain) Á López Morón (Spain) F Verdasco	6	4	4
Alt	(Germany) P Kohlschreiber (Czech Republic) T Zíb	6	3	4
2	(Czech Republic) F Čermák (Czech Republic) L Friedl	4	6	6

Final
(Germany) M Kohlmann (Germany) R Schüttler	6^{6}	6^{11}
2	(Czech Republic) F Čermák (Czech Republic) L Friedl	7^{8}	7^{13}
