= 1980 Suisse Open Gstaad =

- Date: 7–13 July
- Edition: 35th
- Category: Grand Prix
- Draw: 32S / 16D
- Prize money: $125,000
- Surface: Clay / outdoor
- Location: Gstaad, Switzerland

Champions

Singles
- (Switzerland) Heinz Günthardt

Doubles
- (Rhodesia) Colin Dowdeswell / (Egypt) Ismail El Shafei
- Suisse Open Gstaad

The 1980 Suisse Open Gstaad was a men's tennis tournament played on outdoor clay courts in Gstaad, Switzerland. It was the 35th edition of the tournament and was held from 7 July through 13 July 1980. The tournament was part of the 1980 Volvo Grand Prix tennis circuit. Third-seeded Heinz Günthardt won the singles title.

== Finals ==
=== Singles ===
(Switzerland) Heinz Günthardt defeated (Australia) Kim Warwick 4–6, 6–4, 7–6

- It was Günthardt's 3rd singles title of the year and the 4th of his career.

=== Doubles ===
(Rhodesia) Colin Dowdeswell / (Egypt) Ismail El Shafei defeated (Australia) Mark Edmondson / (Australia) Kim Warwick 6–4, 6–4
