= 2015 Swiss Open Gstaad – Doubles =

Doubles
- 2015 Swiss Open Gstaad

Final
- Champions: (Belarus) Aliaksandr Bury (Uzbekistan) Denis Istomin
- Runners-up: (Austria) Oliver Marach (Pakistan) Aisam-ul-Haq Qureshi
- Score: 3–6, 6–2, [10–5]

Details
- Draw: 16
- Seeds: 4

Events
Singles	Doubles
- Swiss Open Gstaad

Andre Begemann and Robin Haase were the defending champions, but Begemann chose not to participate this year. Haase played alongside Mikhail Youzhny, but lost in the first round to Oliver Marach and Aisam-ul-Haq Qureshi.
Aliaksandr Bury and Denis Istomin won the title, defeating Marach and Qureshi in the final, 3–6, 6–2, [10–5].

== Seeds ==
1. (Spain) Marcel Granollers / (Spain) Marc López (semifinals)
2. (Poland) Mariusz Fyrstenberg / (Mexico) Santiago González (first round)
3. (Austria) Oliver Marach / (Pakistan) Aisam-ul-Haq Qureshi (final)
4. (Austria) Julian Knowle / (Austria) Philipp Oswald (semifinals)

== Draw ==
Key

- Q = Qualifier
- WC = Wild card
- LL = Lucky loser
- Alt = Alternate
- ITF = ITF entry
- PR = Protected ranking
- SR = Special ranking
- SE = Special exempt
- JE = Junior exempt
- JR = Junior Accelerator Programme entrant
- CO = College Accelerator Programme entrant
- NG = Next Gen Accelerator Program entrant
- w/o = Walkover
- r = Retired
- d = Defaulted

=== Draw ===
First round
1	(Spain) M Granollers (Spain) M López	6	6
WC	(Switzerland) A Bossel (Switzerland) M Chiudinelli	3	2
(Argentina) F Delbonis (Italy) P Lorenzi	6	6^{7}	[10]
(Spain) P Carreño Busta (Argentina) A Molteni	3	7^{9}	[6]
3	(Austria) O Marach (Pakistan) A-u-H Qureshi	6	6
(Netherlands) R Haase (Russia) M Youzhny	3	3
WC	(Switzerland) H Laaksonen (Switzerland) L Margaroli	7^{9}	6
(Colombia) S Giraldo (Spain) F López	6^{7}	2
(Argentina) G Durán (Argentina) H Zeballos	7^{7}	7^{7}
(Serbia) D Lajović (Portugal) J Sousa	6^{3}	6^{5}
(Belarus) S Betov (Russia) M Elgin	5	3
4	(Austria) J Knowle (Austria) P Oswald	7	6
(Argentina) M González (Brazil) A Sá	6	6^{4}	[6]
PR	(Poland) T Bednarek (Australia) R Junaid	2	7^{7}	[10]
(Belarus) A Bury (Uzbekistan) D Istomin	6	7^{7}
2	(Poland) M Fyrstenberg (Mexico) S González	3	6^{5}

Quarterfinals
1	(Spain) M Granollers (Spain) M López	7^{7}	3	[10]
(Argentina) F Delbonis (Italy) P Lorenzi	6^{5}	6	[8]
3	(Austria) O Marach (Pakistan) A-u-H Qureshi	6	6
WC	(Switzerland) H Laaksonen (Switzerland) L Margaroli	3	4
(Argentina) G Durán (Argentina) H Zeballos	4	6^{4}
4	(Austria) J Knowle (Austria) P Oswald	6	7^{7}
PR	(Poland) T Bednarek (Australia) R Junaid	3	4
(Belarus) A Bury (Uzbekistan) D Istomin	6	6

Semifinals
1	(Spain) M Granollers (Spain) M López	3	6	[6]
3	(Austria) O Marach (Pakistan) A-u-H Qureshi	6	4	[10]
4	(Austria) J Knowle (Austria) P Oswald	4	6	[3]
(Belarus) A Bury (Uzbekistan) D Istomin	6	3	[10]

Final
3	(Austria) O Marach (Pakistan) A-u-H Qureshi	6	2	[5]
(Belarus) A Bury (Uzbekistan) D Istomin	3	6	[10]
