= 2013 Crédit Agricole Suisse Open Gstaad – Singles =

Singles
- 2013 Crédit Agricole Suisse Open Gstaad

Final
- Champion: (Russia) Mikhail Youzhny
- Runner-up: (Netherlands) Robin Haase
- Score: 6–3, 6–4

Details
- Draw: 28
- Seeds: 8

Events
Singles	Doubles
- Swiss Open

Thomaz Bellucci was the defending champion but lost to Federico Delbonis in the first round.
Mikhail Youzhny won the title, defeating Robin Haase in the final, 6–3, 6–4.

== Seeds ==
The top four seeds receive a bye into the second round.

1. (Switzerland) Roger Federer (second round)
2. (Switzerland) Stanislas Wawrinka (quarterfinals, retired due to back injury)
3. (Serbia) Janko Tipsarević (second round)
4. (Argentina) Juan Mónaco (quarterfinals)
5. (Spain) Feliciano López (semifinals)
6. (Russia) Mikhail Youzhny (champion)
7. (Czech Republic) Lukáš Rosol (first round)
8. (Spain) Roberto Bautista Agut (second round, retired)

== Draw ==
Key

- Q = Qualifier
- WC = Wild card
- LL = Lucky loser
- Alt = Alternate
- ITF = ITF entry
- PR = Protected ranking
- SR = Special ranking
- SE = Special exempt
- JE = Junior exempt
- JR = Junior Accelerator Programme entrant
- CO = College Accelerator Programme entrant
- NG = Next Gen Accelerator Program entrant
- w/o = Walkover
- r = Retired
- d = Defaulted

=== Finals ===
Semifinals
(Romania) Victor Hănescu	3	3
6	(Russia) Mikhail Youzhny	6	6
(Netherlands) Robin Haase	4	6	6
5	(Spain) Feliciano López	6	1	4

Final
6	(Russia) Mikhail Youzhny	6	6
(Netherlands) Robin Haase	3	4

=== Top half ===
First round
(Germany) D Brands	6	3	6
WC	(Switzerland) M Chiudinelli	3	6	2
Q	(Germany) D Brown	6^{6}	2
(Romania) V Hănescu	7^{8}	6
WC	(Switzerland) H Laaksonen	2	3
8	(Spain) R Bautista Agut	6	6
(Spain) G García López	6	6^{2}	6
(Romania) A Ungur	4	7^{7}	1
(Spain) P Andújar	6	6
Q	(Romania) V Crivoi	1	2
(France) P-H Mathieu	3	6	2
6	(Russia) M Youzhny	6	4	6

Second round
1/WC	(Switzerland) R Federer	3	4
(Germany) D Brands	6	6
(Romania) V Hănescu	7^{7}	3
8	(Spain) R Bautista Agut	6^{2}	2^{r}
4	(Argentina) J Mónaco	6	6
(Spain) G García López	1	2
(Spain) P Andújar	3	6	3
6	(Russia) M Youzhny	6	4	6

Quarterfinals
(Germany) D Brands	3	4
(Romania) V Hănescu	6	6
4	(Argentina) J Mónaco	7	4	6^{7}
6	(Russia) M Youzhny	5	6	7^{9}

Semifinals
(Romania) V Hănescu	3	3
6	(Russia) M Youzhny	6	6

=== Bottom half ===
First round
7	(Czech Republic) L Rosol	2	4
(Spain) M Granollers	6	6
(Argentina) F Delbonis	7	7^{7}
(Brazil) T Bellucci	5	6^{2}
(Netherlands) R Haase	6	7^{9}
Q	(Brazil) J Souza	4	6^{7}
5	(Spain) F López	7^{7}	6
Q	(Czech Republic) J Hernych	6^{2}	3
(Ukraine) S Stakhovsky	5	6	2
(Russia) A Kuznetsov	7	3	6
(Spain) D Gimeno Traver	6	6
(France) K de Schepper	4	4

Second round
(Spain) M Granollers	6	7
(Argentina) F Delbonis	2	5
(Netherlands) R Haase	6	6
3	(Serbia) J Tipsarević	2	2
5	(Spain) F López	6	6
(Russia) A Kuznetsov	4	3
(Spain) D Gimeno Traver	5	6^{4}
2	(Switzerland) S Wawrinka	7	7^{7}

Quarterfinals
(Spain) M Granollers	7	3	6^{5}
(Netherlands) R Haase	5	6	7^{7}
5	(Spain) F López	6	2	4
2	(Switzerland) S Wawrinka	4	6	3^{r}

Semifinals
(Netherlands) R Haase	4	6	6
5	(Spain) F López	6	1	4

== Qualifying ==
=== Seeds ===
All seeds receive a bye into the second round.

1. (Brazil) João Souza (qualified)
2. (Czech Republic) Jan Hernych (qualified)
3. (Germany) Dustin Brown (qualified)
4. (Argentina) Facundo Bagnis (qualifying competition)
5. (Romania) Victor Crivoi (qualified)
6. (Brazil) Guilherme Clezar (qualifying competition)
7. (France) Florian Reynet (qualifying competition)
8. (France) Hugo Nys (second round)

=== Qualifiers ===
1. (Brazil) João Souza
2. (Czech Republic) Jan Hernych
3. (Germany) Dustin Brown
4. (Romania) Victor Crivoi

=== Qualifying draw ===
==== First qualifier ====
First round				Second round				Qualifying competition
				1	(Brazil) João Souza	6	6
	(Switzerland) Alexander Sadecky	7^{7}	6		(Switzerland) Alexander Sadecky	4	2
WC	(Switzerland) Jacob Kahoun	6^{4}	1					1	(Brazil) João Souza	7^{7}	6
	(France) Alexandre Penaud	6	6					6	(Brazil) Guilherme Clezar	6^{3}	2
WC	(France) Thierry Roggi	3	1		(France) Alexandre Penaud	1	5
				6	(Brazil) Guilherme Clezar	6	7

==== Second qualifier ====
First round				Second round					Qualifying competition
				2	(Czech Republic) Jan Hernych	2	6	6
(Switzerland) Loïc Perret		7	6		(Switzerland) Loïc Perret	6	3	1
(Greece) Alexandros Jakupovic		5	4						2	(Czech Republic) Jan Hernych	6	7^{7}
WC	(Switzerland) George Bastl	2	3							(Brazil) Wilson Leite	2	6^{3}
	(Brazil) Wilson Leite	6	6		(Brazil) Wilson Leite	6	6
				8	(France) Hugo Nys	2	2

==== Third qualifier ====
First round				Second round				Qualifying competition
				3	(Germany) Dustin Brown	6	7^{7}
WC	(Switzerland) Alexander Ritschard	6	7	WC	(Switzerland) Alexander Ritschard	2	6^{3}
	(Switzerland) Joss Espasandin	4	5					3	(Germany) Dustin Brown	6	6
(Bolivia) Alejandro Mendoza		6	6					7	(France) Florian Reynet	4	2
(Italy) Francesco Vilardo		3	2		(Bolivia) Alejandro Mendoza	2	0
				7	(France) Florian Reynet	6	6

==== Fourth qualifier ====
First round					Second round				Qualifying competition
					4	(Argentina) Facundo Bagnis	7	6
(Romania) Florin Mergea		2	1			(Brazil) Henrique Cunha	5	4
(Brazil) Henrique Cunha		6	6						4	(Argentina) Facundo Bagnis	2	6	4
WC	(Switzerland) Stefan Fiacan	4	7^{8}	4					5	(Romania) Victor Crivoi	6	4	6
	(Brazil) Carlos Eduardo Severino	6	6^{6}	6		(Brazil) Carlos Eduardo Severino	1	0
					5	(Romania) Victor Crivoi	6	6
