= 2005 Allianz Suisse Open Gstaad – Singles =

Singles
- 2005 Allianz Suisse Open Gstaad

Final
- Champion: (Argentina) Gastón Gaudio
- Runner-up: (Switzerland) Stan Wawrinka
- Score: 6–4, 6–4

Details
- Draw: 32
- Seeds: 8

Events
Singles	Doubles
- Swiss Open

Roger Federer was the defending champion, but did not participate this year.

Gastón Gaudio won the tournament, beating Stan Wawrinka in the final, 6–4, 6–4.

== Seeds ==
1. (Russia) Nikolay Davydenko (first round, retired due to a wrist injury)
2. (Argentina) Gastón Gaudio (champion)
3. (Czech Republic) Radek Štěpánek (second round)
4. (Spain) David Ferrer (first round)
5. (Croatia) Ivan Ljubičić (second round)
6. (Czech Republic) Jiří Novák (first round)
7. (Chile) Nicolás Massú (semifinals)
8. (Italy) Filippo Volandri (first round)

== Draw ==
Key

- Q = Qualifier
- WC = Wild card
- LL = Lucky loser
- Alt = Alternate
- ITF = ITF entry
- PR = Protected ranking
- SR = Special ranking
- SE = Special exempt
- JE = Junior exempt
- JR = Junior Accelerator Programme entrant
- CO = College Accelerator Programme entrant
- NG = Next Gen Accelerator Program entrant
- w/o = Walkover
- r = Retired
- d = Defaulted

=== Finals ===
Semifinals
Q	(Romania) Răzvan Sabău	6^{7}	4
(Switzerland) Stan Wawrinka	7^{9}	6
7	(Chile) Nicolás Massú	3	2
2	(Argentina) Gastón Gaudio	6	6

Final
(Switzerland) Stan Wawrinka	4	4
2	(Argentina) Gastón Gaudio	6	6

=== Top half ===
First round
1	(Russia) N Davydenko	6	1^{r}
(Armenia) S Sargsian	1	0
WC	(Switzerland) M Lammer	6	2	3
Q	(Romania) R Sabău	3	6	6
(Russia) I Andreev	5	3
(Spain) F López	7	6
(Italy) P Starace	6	6^{3}	7
6	(Czech Republic) J Novák	3	7^{7}	5
3	(Czech Republic) R Štěpánek	7^{8}	6
WC	(Switzerland) Y Allegro	6^{6}	1
(Germany) P Kohlschreiber	3	5
Q	(Czech Republic) F Čermák	6	7
(Spain) F Verdasco	6	6
Q	(Czech Republic) J Pospíšil	2	4
(Switzerland) S Wawrinka	6	2	6
8	(Italy) F Volandri	1	6	4

Second round
(Armenia) S Sargsian	4	4
Q	(Romania) R Sabău	6	6
(Spain) F López	6^{6}	0
(Italy) P Starace	7^{8}	6
3	(Czech Republic) R Štěpánek	7^{7}	4	4
Q	(Czech Republic) F Čermák	6^{5}	6	6
(Spain) F Verdasco	6	4	6^{8}
(Switzerland) S Wawrinka	3	6	7^{10}

Quarterfinals
Q	(Romania) R Sabău	0	7	7
(Italy) P Starace	6	5	5
Q	(Czech Republic) F Čermák	4	6^{5}
(Switzerland) S Wawrinka	6	7^{7}

Semifinals
Q	(Romania) R Sabău	6^{7}	4
(Switzerland) S Wawrinka	7^{9}	6

=== Bottom half ===
First round
7	(Chile) N Massú	7^{7}	7^{7}
(Germany) T Behrend	6^{4}	6^{3}
(Czech Republic) J Hernych	7	6
Q	(United States) H Armando	5	3
(Peru) L Horna	7^{10}	6
(Czech Republic) T Zíb	6^{8}	4
(Italy) A di Mauro	6	1	6
4	(Spain) D Ferrer	4	6	3
5	(Croatia) I Ljubičić	6	6
(Brazil) R Mello	3	2
(Austria) S Koubek	7^{7}	6^{5}	6^{6}
(Italy) A Seppi	6^{5}	7^{7}	7^{8}
(Germany) R Schüttler	7^{8}	2	3
(Italy) D Sanguinetti	6^{6}	6	6
WC	(Switzerland) G Bastl	5	2
2	(Argentina) G Gaudio	7	6

Second round
7	(Chile) N Massú	7	2	6
(Czech Republic) J Hernych	5	6	4
(Peru) L Horna	6	6
(Italy) A di Mauro	3	4
5	(Croatia) I Ljubičić	6^{4}	3
(Italy) A Seppi	7^{7}	6
(Italy) D Sanguinetti	2	2
2	(Argentina) G Gaudio	6	6

Quarterfinals
7	(Chile) N Massú	6	6
(Peru) L Horna	4	4
(Italy) A Seppi	4	6	6^{5}
2	(Argentina) G Gaudio	6	1	7^{7}

Semifinals
7	(Chile) N Massú	3	2
2	(Argentina) G Gaudio	6	6
