= 1994 Suisse Open Gstaad =

- Date: 4–11 July
- Edition: 49th
- Category: World Series
- Draw: 32S / 16D
- Prize money: $450,000
- Surface: Clay / outdoor
- Location: Gstaad, Switzerland
- Venue: Roy Emerson Arena

Champions

Singles
- (Spain) Sergi Bruguera

Doubles
- (Spain) Sergio Casal / (Spain) Emilio Sánchez
- Suisse Open Gstaad

The 1994 Suisse Open Gstaad, also known by its sponsored name RADO Swiss Open, was an ATP men's tennis tournament held on outdoor clay courts at the Roy Emerson Arena in Gstaad, Switzerland that was part of the World Series of the 1994 ATP Tour. It was the 49th edition of the tournament and was held from 4 July until 11 July 1994. Sergi Bruguera won his second title of the year, and 13th of his career. It was his third time winning the event after in 1992 and 1993.

== Finals ==
=== Singles ===
(Spain) Sergi Bruguera defeated (France) Guy Forget 3–6, 7–5, 6–2, 6–1

- It was Bruguera's 2nd singles title of the year and the 13th of his career.

=== Doubles ===
(Spain) Sergio Casal / (Spain) Emilio Sánchez defeated (Netherlands) Menno Oosting / (Czech Republic) Daniel Vacek 7–6, 6–4

- It was Casal's 1st doubles title of the year and the 44th of his career. It was Sánchez' 1st doubles title of the year and the 47th of his career.
