= 2016 Swiss Open Gstaad – Doubles =

Doubles
- 2016 Swiss Open Gstaad

Final
- Champions: (Chile) Julio Peralta (Argentina) Horacio Zeballos
- Runners-up: (Croatia) Mate Pavić (New Zealand) Michael Venus
- Score: 7–6^{(7–2)}, 6–2

Details
- Draw: 16
- Seeds: 4

Events
Singles	Doubles
- Swiss Open Gstaad

Aliaksandr Bury and Denis Istomin were the defending champions, but Bury chose to compete in Kitzbühel instead. Istomin played alongside Dominic Inglot, but lost in the quarterfinals to Purav Raja and Divij Sharan.

Julio Peralta and Horacio Zeballos won the title, defeating Mate Pavić and Michael Venus in the final, 7–6^{(7–2)}, 6–2.

== Seeds ==
1. (Croatia) Mate Pavić / (New Zealand) Michael Venus (final)
2. (Pakistan) Aisam-ul-Haq Qureshi / (Brazil) André Sá (first round)
3. (United Kingdom) Dominic Inglot / (Uzbekistan) Denis Istomin (quarterfinals)
4. (Chile) Julio Peralta / (Argentina) Horacio Zeballos (champions)

== Draw ==
Key

- Q = Qualifier
- WC = Wild card
- LL = Lucky loser
- Alt = Alternate
- ITF = ITF entry
- PR = Protected ranking
- SR = Special ranking
- SE = Special exempt
- JE = Junior exempt
- JR = Junior Accelerator Programme entrant
- CO = College Accelerator Programme entrant
- NG = Next Gen Accelerator Program entrant
- w/o = Walkover
- r = Retired
- d = Defaulted

=== Draw ===
First round
1	(Croatia) M Pavić (New Zealand) M Venus	6	6
(Russia) M Elgin (Russia) M Youzhny	2	2
(New Zealand) M Daniell (Brazil) M Demoliner	7^{8}	6
(Sweden) J Brunström (Sweden) A Siljeström	6^{6}	4
3	(United Kingdom) D Inglot (Uzbekistan) D Istomin	7	6
WC	(Switzerland) A Bellier (Switzerland) H Laaksonen	5	3
(France) T Lamasine (France) P-H Mathieu	4	4
(India) P Raja (India) D Sharan	6	6
WC	(Germany) A Begemann (Netherlands) R Haase	4	6	[10]
(Australia) R Junaid (Germany) A Satschko	6	3	[4]
(Poland) T Bednarek (Belarus) S Betov	3	2
4	(Chile) J Peralta (Argentina) H Zeballos	6	6
(Netherlands) S Arends (Austria) T-S Weissborn	7^{7}	2	[10]
(Russia) K Kravchuk (Ukraine) D Molchanov	6^{5}	6	[8]
(Germany) D Brown (Switzerland) M Chiudinelli	7^{7}	6
2	(Pakistan) A-u-H Qureshi (Brazil) A Sá	6^{5}	3

Quarterfinals
1	(Croatia) M Pavić (New Zealand) M Venus	7^{7}	7^{7}
(New Zealand) M Daniell (Brazil) M Demoliner	6^{3}	6^{5}
3	(United Kingdom) D Inglot (Uzbekistan) D Istomin	6^{6}	7^{7}	[7]
(India) P Raja (India) D Sharan	7^{8}	6^{5}	[10]
WC	(Germany) A Begemann (Netherlands) R Haase	7^{7}	6^{2}	[3]
4	(Chile) J Peralta (Argentina) H Zeballos	6^{4}	7^{7}	[10]
(Netherlands) S Arends (Austria) T-S Weissborn	6	2	[10]
(Germany) D Brown (Switzerland) M Chiudinelli	3	6	[4]

Semifinals
1	(Croatia) M Pavić (New Zealand) M Venus	3	7^{7}	[10]
(India) P Raja (India) D Sharan	6	6^{4}	[2]
4	(Chile) J Peralta (Argentina) H Zeballos	6	3	[11]
(Netherlands) S Arends (Austria) T-S Weissborn	1	6	[9]

Final
1	(Croatia) M Pavić (New Zealand) M Venus	6^{2}	2
4	(Chile) J Peralta (Argentina) H Zeballos	7^{7}	6
