= 2015 Swiss Open Gstaad – Singles =

Singles
- 2015 Swiss Open Gstaad

Final
- Champion: (Austria) Dominic Thiem
- Runner-up: (Belgium) David Goffin
- Score: 7–5, 6–2

Details
- Draw: 28
- Seeds: 8

Events
Singles	Doubles
- Swiss Open Gstaad

Pablo Andújar was the defending champion, but lost to Thomaz Bellucci in the quarterfinals.

Dominic Thiem won the title, defeating David Goffin in the final, 7–5, 6–2.

== Seeds ==
The top four seeds receive a bye into the second round.

1. (Belgium) David Goffin (final)
2. (Spain) Feliciano López (semifinals)
3. (Austria) Dominic Thiem (champion)
4. (Spain) Pablo Andújar (quarterfinals)
5. (Brazil) Thomaz Bellucci (semifinals)
6. (Portugal) João Sousa (quarterfinals)
7. (Spain) Pablo Carreño Busta (quarterfinals)
8. (Colombia) Santiago Giraldo (quarterfinals)

== Draw ==
Key

- Q = Qualifier
- WC = Wild card
- LL = Lucky loser
- Alt = Alternate
- ITF = ITF entry
- PR = Protected ranking
- SR = Special ranking
- SE = Special exempt
- JE = Junior exempt
- JR = Junior Accelerator Programme entrant
- CO = College Accelerator Programme entrant
- NG = Next Gen Accelerator Program entrant
- w/o = Walkover
- r = Retired
- d = Defaulted

=== Finals ===
Semifinals
1	(Belgium) David Goffin	6	6
5	(Brazil) Thomaz Bellucci	4	2
3	(Austria) Dominic Thiem	6	6^{5}	6
2	(Spain) Feliciano López	3	7^{7}	3

Final
1	(Belgium) David Goffin	5	2
3	(Austria) Dominic Thiem	7	6

=== Top half ===
First round
WC	(Russia) A Rublev	4	6^{1}
Q	(Argentina) H Zeballos	6	7^{7}
Q	(France) M Teixeira	0	4
(Uzbekistan) D Istomin	6	6
WC	(Switzerland) H Laaksonen	2	5
6	(Portugal) J Sousa	6	7
Q	(France) C Hemery	5	2
(Serbia) D Lajović	7	6
PR	(France) S Robert	6	6
(Brazil) J Souza	1	4
(Belgium) K Coppejans	2	3
5	(Brazil) T Bellucci	6	6

Second round
1	(Belgium) D Goffin	6	6
Q	(Argentina) H Zeballos	1	1
(Uzbekistan) D Istomin	7^{8}	3	6^{4}
6	(Portugal) J Sousa	6^{6}	6	7^{7}
4	(Spain) P Andújar	7	6
(Serbia) D Lajović	5	2
PR	(France) S Robert	3	2
5	(Brazil) T Bellucci	6	6

Quarterfinals
1	(Belgium) D Goffin	6^{7}	6	7^{7}
6	(Portugal) J Sousa	7^{9}	4	6^{1}
4	(Spain) P Andújar	6	4	1
5	(Brazil) T Bellucci	3	6	6

Semifinals
1	(Belgium) D Goffin	6	6
5	(Brazil) T Bellucci	4	2

=== Bottom half ===
First round
7	(Spain) P Carreño Busta	6	6
(Russia) M Youzhny	1	2
(Netherlands) R Haase	1	7^{7}	6
(Spain) M Granollers	6	6^{1}	4
WC	(Switzerland) M Chiudinelli	4	2
(Argentina) F Delbonis	6	6
8	(Colombia) S Giraldo	6	6
(Italy) P Lorenzi	3	2
(Turkey) M İlhan	6	6
(Russia) A Kuznetsov	1	2
(Slovenia) B Kavčič	6	0^{r}
Q	(Germany) J Reister	4	2

Second round
7	(Spain) P Carreño Busta	7^{7}	6
(Netherlands) R Haase	6^{3}	4
(Argentina) F Delbonis	3	4
3	(Austria) D Thiem	6	6
8	(Colombia) S Giraldo	6	6
(Turkey) M İlhan	2	3
Q	(Germany) J Reister	6	4	1
2	(Spain) F López	2	6	6

Quarterfinals
7	(Spain) P Carreño Busta	4	6	2
3	(Austria) D Thiem	6	3	6
8	(Colombia) S Giraldo	6^{4}	4
2	(Spain) F López	7^{7}	6

Semifinals
3	(Austria) D Thiem	6	6^{5}	6
2	(Spain) F López	3	7^{7}	3

== Qualifying ==
=== Seeds ===
1. (Argentina) Facundo Bagnis (first round)
2. (Argentina) Horacio Zeballos (qualified)
3. (France) Kenny de Schepper (qualifying competition)
4. (Austria) Gerald Melzer (second round)
5. (Italy) Andrea Arnaboldi (qualifying competition)
6. (Serbia) Laslo Djere (second round)
7. (Ecuador) Giovanni Lapentti (first round)
8. (Italy) Matteo Viola (first round)

=== Qualifiers ===
1. (France) Maxime Teixeira
2. (Argentina) Horacio Zeballos
3. (Germany) Julian Reister
4. (France) Calvin Hemery

=== Qualifying draw ===
==== First qualifier ====
First round
1	(Argentina) Facundo Bagnis	6^{6}	1
(Romania) Victor Hănescu	7^{8}	6
(Croatia) Nikola Mektić	6^{1}	6^{4}
(France) Maxime Teixeira	7^{7}	7^{7}
WC	(Switzerland) Loïc Perret	2	4
(Argentina) Juan Ignacio Londero	6	6
(Russia) Daniil Medvedev	6	6
8	(Italy) Matteo Viola	4	4

Second round
(Romania) Victor Hănescu	3	6	3
(France) Maxime Teixeira	6	1	6
(Argentina) Juan Ignacio Londero	3	0
(Russia) Daniil Medvedev	6	6

Qualifying competition
(France) Maxime Teixeira	7^{7}	7^{14}
(Russia) Daniil Medvedev	6^{5}	6^{12}

==== Second qualifier ====
First round
2	(Argentina) Horacio Zeballos	6	7^{7}
(Bulgaria) Alexandar Lazov	1	6^{2}
(Brazil) Fernando Romboli	3	3
(Argentina) Tomás Lipovšek Puches	6	6
WC	(Switzerland) Jessy Kalambay	3	2
(Argentina) Pedro Cachin	6	6
(Slovakia) Ivo Klec	4	4
6	(Serbia) Laslo Djere	6	6

Second round
2	(Argentina) Horacio Zeballos	6	6
(Argentina) Tomás Lipovšek Puches	4	3
(Argentina) Pedro Cachin	3	6	6
6	(Serbia) Laslo Djere	6	1	1

Qualifying competition
2	(Argentina) Horacio Zeballos	6	6
(Argentina) Pedro Cachin	2	4

==== Third qualifier ====
First round
3	(France) Kenny de Schepper	7^{7}	6
(Russia) Kirill Dmitriev	6^{1}	4
(Croatia) Antonio Veić	6	3	6
(Switzerland) Yann Marti	3	6	0
(Switzerland) Adrien Bossel	6	6
WC	(Switzerland) Luca Margaroli	2	2
PR	(Germany) Julian Reister	6	6
7	(Ecuador) Giovanni Lapentti	4	1

Second round
3	(France) Kenny de Schepper	6	7^{7}
(Croatia) Antonio Veić	3	6^{3}
(Switzerland) Adrien Bossel	3	4
PR	(Germany) Julian Reister	6	6

Qualifying competition
3	(France) Kenny de Schepper	3	3
PR	(Germany) Julian Reister	6	6

==== Fourth qualifier ====
First round
4	(Austria) Gerald Melzer	6	6
(India) Vijay Sundar Prashanth	2	2
(Austria) Michael Linzer	7^{7}	6^{8}	4
(France) Calvin Hemery	6^{2}	7^{10}	6
WC	(Switzerland) Jacob Kahoun	3	4
(Italy) Federico Gaio	6	6
(Russia) Anton Zaitcev	3	7^{7}	4
5	(Italy) Andrea Arnaboldi	6	6^{5}	6

Second round
4	(Austria) Gerald Melzer	5	5
(France) Calvin Hemery	7	7
(Italy) Federico Gaio	4	2
5	(Italy) Andrea Arnaboldi	6	6

Qualifying competition
(France) Calvin Hemery	1	6	6
5	(Italy) Andrea Arnaboldi	6	3	2
