= 2013 Crédit Agricole Suisse Open Gstaad – Doubles =

Doubles
- 2013 Crédit Agricole Suisse Open Gstaad

Final
- Champions: (United Kingdom) Jamie Murray (Australia) John Peers
- Runners-up: (Spain) Pablo Andújar (Spain) Guillermo García-López
- Score: 6–3, 6–4

Details
- Draw: 16
- Seeds: 4

Events
| Singles | Doubles |
- Swiss Open

Marcel Granollers and Marc López were the defending champions but decided not to participate.
Jamie Murray and John Peers won the title, defeating Pablo Andújar and Guillermo García-López in the final, 6–3, 6–4.

== Seeds ==
1. (Italy) Daniele Bracciali / (Slovakia) Filip Polášek (first round)
2. (Sweden) Johan Brunström / (South Africa) Raven Klaasen (quarterfinals)
3. (United Kingdom) Jamie Murray / (Australia) John Peers (champions)
4. (Germany) Dustin Brown / (Australia) Paul Hanley (quarterfinals)

== Draw ==
Key

- Q = Qualifier
- WC = Wild card
- LL = Lucky loser
- Alt = Alternate
- ITF = ITF entry
- PR = Protected ranking
- SR = Special ranking
- SE = Special exempt
- JE = Junior exempt
- JR = Junior Accelerator Programme entrant
- CO = College Accelerator Programme entrant
- NG = Next Gen Accelerator Program entrant
- w/o = Walkover
- r = Retired
- d = Defaulted

=== Draw ===
First round
1 | (Italy) D Bracciali (Slovakia) F Polášek | 2 | 3
(Argentina) F Bagnis (United Kingdom) J Delgado | 6 | 6
PR | (Argentina) L Arnold Ker (Argentina) J Mónaco | 7^{7} | 6
(Brazil) T Bellucci (Brazil) J Souza | 6^{5} | 4
3 | (United Kingdom) J Murray (Australia) J Peers | 6 | 6
(France) P-H Mathieu (Ukraine) S Stakhovsky | 3 | 4
(Germany) C Kas (Austria) O Marach | 3 | 6 | [13]
(Spain) R Bautista-Agut (Spain) D Gimeno-Traver | 6 | 4 | [15]
(Germany) D Brands (Netherlands) R Haase | 2 | 4
(Spain) P Andújar (Spain) G García-López | 6 | 6
WC | (Switzerland) A Ritschard (Switzerland) A Sadecky | 6 | 6^{4} | [5]
4 | (Germany) D Brown (Australia) P Hanley | 1 | 7^{7} | [10]
WC | (Switzerland) M Chiudinelli (Switzerland) H Laaksonen | 2 | 4
(Romania) F Mergea (Czech Republic) L Rosol | 6 | 6
(Russia) A Kuznetsov (Romania) A Ungur | 3 | 6^{3}
2 | (Sweden) J Brunström (South Africa) R Klaasen | 6 | 7^{7}

Quarterfinals
(Argentina) F Bagnis (United Kingdom) J Delgado | 6 | 6
PR | (Argentina) L Arnold Ker (Argentina) J Mónaco | 3 | 4
3 | (United Kingdom) J Murray (Australia) J Peers | w/o
(Spain) R Bautista-Agut (Spain) D Gimeno-Traver
(Spain) P Andújar (Spain) G García-López | 6 | 6
4 | (Germany) D Brown (Australia) P Hanley | 3 | 1
(Romania) F Mergea (Czech Republic) L Rosol | 7 | 7
2 | (Sweden) J Brunström (South Africa) R Klaasen | 5 | 5

Semifinals
(Argentina) F Bagnis (United Kingdom) J Delgado | 1 | 4
3 | (United Kingdom) J Murray (Australia) J Peers | 6 | 6
(Spain) P Andújar (Spain) G García-López | 1 | 6 | [10]
(Romania) F Mergea (Czech Republic) L Rosol | 6 | 3 | 4

Final
3 | (United Kingdom) J Murray (Australia) J Peers | 6 | 6
(Spain) P Andújar (Spain) G García-López | 3 | 4
