= 1981 Suisse Open Gstaad =

- Date: 6–12 July
- Edition: 36th
- Category: Grand Prix
- Draw: 32S / 16D
- Prize money: $125,000
- Surface: Clay / outdoor
- Location: Gstaad, Switzerland

Champions

Singles
- (Poland) Wojciech Fibak

Doubles
- (Switzerland) Heinz Günthardt / (Switzerland) Markus Günthardt
- Suisse Open Gstaad

The 1981 Suisse Open Gstaad was a men's tennis tournament played on outdoor clay courts in Gstaad, Switzerland. It was the 36th edition of the tournament and was held from 6 July through 12 July 1981. The tournament was part of the 1981 Volvo Grand Prix tennis circuit. Third-seeded Wojciech Fibak won the singles title.

== Finals ==
=== Singles ===
(Poland) Wojciech Fibak defeated (France) Yannick Noah 6–1, 7–6

- It was Fibak's 1st singles title of the year and the 12th of his career.

=== Doubles ===
(Switzerland) Heinz Günthardt / (Switzerland) Markus Günthardt defeated (Australia) David Carter / (Australia) Paul Kronk 6–4, 6–1
