= 1972 Suisse Open Gstaad =

- Date: 10–16 July
- Edition: 27th
- Category: Grand Prix (Group C)
- Draw: 32S
- Prize money: $25,000
- Surface: Clay / outdoor
- Location: Gstaad, Switzerland

Champions

Singles
- (Spain) Andrés Gimeno

Doubles
- (Spain) Andrés Gimeno / (Spain) Antonio Muñoz
- Swiss Open

The 1972 Suisse Open Gstaad was a men's tennis tournament played on outdoor clay courts in Gstaad, Switzerland. It was the 27th edition of the tournament and was held from 10 July until 16 July 1972. The tournament was part of the Grand Prix tennis circuit and was categorized as a Group C event. Andrés Gimeno won the singles title.

== Finals ==
=== Singles ===
(Spain) Andrés Gimeno defeated (Italy) Adriano Panatta 7–5, 9–8, 6–4

=== Doubles ===
(Spain) Andrés Gimeno / (Spain) Antonio Muñoz defeated (Italy) Adriano Panatta / (Romania) Ion Țiriac 9–8, 4–6, 6–1, 7–5
