= 1969 Suisse Open Gstaad =

1969 Swiss Open Championships
- Date: 22–27 July
- Edition: 24th
- Draw: 32S / 16D
- Surface: Clay / outdoor
- Location: Gstaad, Switzerland

Champions

Men's singles
- (Australia) Roy Emerson

Women's singles
- (France) Françoise Dürr

Men's doubles
- (Netherlands) Tom Okker / (United States) Marty Riessen

Women's doubles
- (United States) Rosie Casals / (United States) Billie Jean King
- Suisse Open Gstaad

The 1969 Swiss Open Championships was a combined men's and women's professional tennis tournament played on outdoor clay courts in Gstaad, Switzerland. It was the 24thd edition of the tournament, the second in the Open Era, and was held from 22 July through 27 July 1969. Roy Emerson and Françoise Dürr won the singles titles.

== Finals ==
=== Men's singles ===
(Australia) Roy Emerson defeated (Netherlands) Tom Okker 6–1, 12–14, 6–4, 6–4

=== Women's singles ===
(France) Françoise Dürr defeated (United States) Rosie Casals 6–4, 4–6, 6–2

=== Men's doubles ===
(Netherlands) Tom Okker / (United States) Marty Riessen defeated (Australia) Mal Anderson / (Australia) Roy Emerson 6–1, 6–4

=== Women's doubles ===
(United States) Rosie Casals / (United States) Billie Jean King defeated (France) Françoise Dürr / (United Kingdom) Ann Jones 6–1, 6–3
