= 2010 Allianz Suisse Open Gstaad – Singles =

Singles
- 2010 Allianz Suisse Open Gstaad

Final
- Champion: (Spain) Nicolás Almagro
- Runner-up: (France) Richard Gasquet
- Score: 7–5, 6–1

Details
- Draw: 32
- Seeds: 8

Events
Singles	Doubles
- Swiss Open

Thomaz Bellucci was the defending champion, however he lost to Marco Chiudinelli in the first round.
Nicolás Almagro won in the final 7–5, 6–1, against Richard Gasquet.

== Seeds ==
1. (Russia) Mikhail Youzhny (quarterfinals)
2. (Spain) Nicolás Almagro (champion)
3. (Brazil) Thomaz Bellucci (first round)
4. (Spain) Albert Montañés (quarterfinals)
5. (Spain) Tommy Robredo (first round)
6. (Romania) Victor Hănescu (first round)
7. (France) Richard Gasquet (final)
8. (France) Paul-Henri Mathieu (first round)

== Draw ==
Key

- Q = Qualifier
- WC = Wild card
- LL = Lucky loser
- Alt = Alternate
- ITF = ITF entry
- PR = Protected ranking
- SR = Special ranking
- SE = Special exempt
- JE = Junior exempt
- JR = Junior Accelerator Programme entrant
- CO = College Accelerator Programme entrant
- NG = Next Gen Accelerator Program entrant
- w/o = Walkover
- r = Retired
- d = Defaulted

=== Finals ===
Semifinals
Q	(Kazakhstan) Yuri Schukin	3	4
7	(France) Richard Gasquet	6	6
(Spain) Daniel Gimeno Traver	6^{7}	6	3
2	(Spain) Nicolás Almagro	7^{9}	3	6

Final
7	(France) Richard Gasquet	5	1
2	(Spain) Nicolás Almagro	7	6

=== Top half ===
First round
1	(Russia) M Youzhny	6	6
LL	(France) M Gicquel	2	2
WC	(Switzerland) A Sadecky	7	1	6
Q	(Switzerland) Y Marti	5	6	0
(Kazakhstan) A Golubev	6^{4}	6	3
Q	(Kazakhstan) Y Schukin	7^{7}	2	6
(Portugal) F Gil	4	7	6
5	(Spain) T Robredo	6	5	1
4	(Spain) A Montañés	4	6	7^{7}
(Spain) P Riba	6	3	6^{5}
(Uzbekistan) D Istomin	3	7^{7}	4
Q	(Austria) A Haider-Maurer	6	6^{5}	6
(Germany) D Brands	6	7
(Australia) P Luczak	4	5
Q	(Uzbekistan) F Dustov	3	4
7	(France) R Gasquet	6	6

Second round
1	(Russia) M Youzhny	7	6
WC	(Switzerland) A Sadecky	5	4
Q	(Kazakhstan) Y Schukin	6	6
(Portugal) F Gil	3	3
4	(Spain) A Montañés	3	6	6
Q	(Austria) A Haider-Maurer	6	1	0
(Germany) D Brands	7^{7}	3	0
7	(France) R Gasquet	6^{5}	6	6

Quarterfinals
1	(Russia) M Youzhny	4	6	5
Q	(Kazakhstan) Y Schukin	6	2	7
4	(Spain) A Montañés	6^{5}	4
7	(France) R Gasquet	7^{7}	6

Semifinals
Q	(Kazakhstan) Y Schukin	3	4
7	(France) R Gasquet	6	6

=== Bottom half ===
First round
6	(Romania) V Hănescu	4	4
(Spain) D Gimeno Traver	6	6
WC	(Argentina) A Velotti	3	1
(Germany) A Beck	6	6
(Russia) I Andreev	6	2	6
(France) F Serra	4	6	4
(Switzerland) M Chiudinelli	7^{8}	0	6
3	(Brazil) T Bellucci	6^{6}	6	4
8	(France) P-H Mathieu	1	3
(France) J Chardy	6	6
(Brazil) T Alves	4	6	3
(Finland) J Nieminen	6	4	6
(Jamaica) D Brown	5	5
WC	(Switzerland) M Lammer	7	7
(Spain) M Granollers	6^{5}	6	3
2	(Spain) N Almagro	7^{7}	3	6

Second round
(Spain) D Gimeno Traver	7	6
(Germany) A Beck	5	4
(Russia) I Andreev	6	6^{6}	7^{8}
(Switzerland) M Chiudinelli	3	7^{8}	6^{6}
(France) J Chardy	7	6
(Finland) J Nieminen	5	2
WC	(Switzerland) M Lammer	6	3	2
2	(Spain) N Almagro	3	6	6

Quarterfinals
(Spain) D Gimeno Traver	6	6
(Russia) I Andreev	2	4
(France) J Chardy	2	6^{5}
2	(Spain) N Almagro	6	7^{7}

Semifinals
(Spain) D Gimeno Traver	6^{7}	6	3
2	(Spain) N Almagro	7^{9}	3	6
