= 2017 Swiss Open Gstaad – Singles =

Singles
- 2017 Swiss Open Gstaad

Final
- Champion: (Italy) Fabio Fognini
- Runner-up: (Germany) Yannick Hanfmann
- Score: 6–4, 7–5

Details
- Draw: 28 (4 Q / 3 WC )
- Seeds: 8

Events
Singles	Doubles
- Swiss Open Gstaad

Feliciano López was the defending champion, but lost in the second round to Yannick Hanfmann.

Fabio Fognini won the title, defeating Hanfmann in the final, 6–4, 7–5.

== Seeds ==
The top four seeds receive a bye into the second round.

1. (Belgium) David Goffin (quarterfinals)
2. (Spain) Roberto Bautista Agut (semifinals)
3. (Spain) Feliciano López (second round)
4. (Italy) Fabio Fognini (champion)
5. (Italy) Paolo Lorenzi (second round)
6. (Netherlands) Robin Haase (semifinals)
7. (Serbia) Dušan Lajović (first round)
8. (Portugal) João Sousa (quarterfinals)

== Draw ==
Key

- Q = Qualifier
- WC = Wild card
- LL = Lucky loser
- Alt = Alternate
- ITF = ITF entry
- PR = Protected ranking
- SR = Special ranking
- SE = Special exempt
- JE = Junior exempt
- JR = Junior Accelerator Programme entrant
- CO = College Accelerator Programme entrant
- NG = Next Gen Accelerator Program entrant
- w/o = Walkover
- r = Retired
- d = Defaulted

=== Finals ===
Semifinals
6	(Netherlands) Robin Haase	6	6^{6}	6^{4}
Q	(Germany) Yannick Hanfmann	3	7^{8}	7^{7}
4/WC	(Italy) Fabio Fognini	5	6	6
2	(Spain) Roberto Bautista Agut	7	2	3

Final
Q	(Germany) Yannick Hanfmann	4	5
4/WC	(Italy) Fabio Fognini	6	7

=== Top half ===
First round
(Russia) M Youzhny	6	6^{6}	5
(Moldova) R Albot	4	7^{8}	7
(Brazil) T Monteiro	7^{7}	3	6
(Ukraine) A Dolgopolov	6^{5}	6	3
(Argentina) R Olivo	1	3
6	(Netherlands) R Haase	6	6
Q	(Germany) Y Hanfmann	6	6^{3}	6
(Argentina) F Bagnis	3	7^{7}	4
(Brazil) T Bellucci	6^{2}	7^{7}	5
(Switzerland) H Laaksonen	7^{7}	6^{4}	7
(Colombia) S Giraldo	3	3
8	(Portugal) J Sousa	6	6

Second round
1	(Belgium) D Goffin	2	7^{9}	7^{9}
(Moldova) R Albot	6	6^{7}	6^{7}
(Brazil) T Monteiro	5	5
6	(Netherlands) R Haase	7	7
3	(Spain) F López	6^{5}	6	1
Q	(Germany) Y Hanfmann	7^{7}	3	6
(Switzerland) H Laaksonen	1	2
8	(Portugal) J Sousa	6	6

Quarterfinals
1	(Belgium) D Goffin	5	1
6	(Netherlands) R Haase	7	6
Q	(Germany) Y Hanfmann	6^{10}	6	6
8	(Portugal) J Sousa	7^{12}	2	2

Semifinals
6	(Netherlands) R Haase	6	6^{6}	6^{4}
Q	(Germany) Y Hanfmann	3	7^{8}	7^{7}

=== Bottom half ===
First round
5	(Italy) P Lorenzi	7^{7}	6
WC	(Switzerland) M Chiudinelli	6^{2}	3
Q	(Germany) D Brands	4	4
PR	(Latvia) E Gulbis	6	6
(Slovakia) N Gombos	7^{10}	6
(Japan) T Daniel	6^{8}	2
7	(Serbia) D Lajović	3	6^{3}
(Germany) D Brown	6	7^{7}
Q	(Italy) L Giustino	3	2
(Uzbekistan) D Istomin	6	6
WC	(Switzerland) A Bellier	3	6^{8}
Q	(France) G Sakharov	6	7^{10}

Second round
5	(Italy) P Lorenzi	6^{10}	6	4
PR	(Latvia) E Gulbis	7^{12}	3	6
(Slovakia) N Gombos	6	4	3
4/WC	(Italy) F Fognini	1	6	6
(Germany) D Brown	3	1
(Uzbekistan) D Istomin	6	6
Q	(France) G Sakharov	4	3
2	(Spain) R Bautista Agut	6	6

Quarterfinals
PR	(Latvia) E Gulbis	3	6	3
4/WC	(Italy) F Fognini	6	4	6
(Uzbekistan) D Istomin	3	4
2	(Spain) R Bautista Agut	6	6

Semifinals
4/WC	(Italy) F Fognini	5	6	6
2	(Spain) R Bautista Agut	7	2	3

== Qualifying ==
=== Seeds ===
1. (Belgium) Arthur De Greef (first round)
2. (Brazil) João Souza (qualifying competition)
3. (Spain) Adrián Menéndez Maceiras (first round)
4. (Germany) Yannick Hanfmann (qualified)
5. (Hungary) Attila Balázs (first round)
6. (Italy) Stefano Napolitano (qualifying competition)
7. (Italy) Lorenzo Giustino (qualified)
8. (France) Gleb Sakharov (qualified)

=== Qualifiers ===
1. (France) Gleb Sakharov
2. (Italy) Lorenzo Giustino
3. (Germany) Daniel Brands
4. (Germany) Yannick Hanfmann

=== Qualifying draw ===
==== First qualifier ====
First round
1	(Belgium) Arthur De Greef	6^{5}	2
WC	(Switzerland) Adrian Bodmer	7^{7}	6
(Belgium) Yannick Mertens	4	5
8	(France) Gleb Sakharov	6	7

Qualifying competition
WC	(Switzerland) Adrian Bodmer	3	5
8	(France) Gleb Sakharov	6	7

==== Second qualifier ====
First round
2	(Brazil) João Souza	6	3	7^{7}
(Italy) Gianluigi Quinzi	4	6	6^{5}
Alt	(Switzerland) Yann Marti	4	7^{7}	2
7	(Italy) Lorenzo Giustino	6	6^{3}	6

Qualifying competition
2	(Brazil) João Souza	6^{4}	6^{5}
7	(Italy) Lorenzo Giustino	7^{7}	7^{7}

==== Third qualifier ====
First round
3	(Spain) Adrián Menéndez Maceiras	2	3
(Germany) Daniel Brands	6	6
WC	(Switzerland) Marc-Andrea Hüsler	3	2
6	(Italy) Stefano Napolitano	6	6

Qualifying competition
(Germany) Daniel Brands	7^{7}	5	7^{7}
6	(Italy) Stefano Napolitano	6^{3}	7	6^{3}

==== Fourth qualifier ====
First round
4	(Germany) Yannick Hanfmann	6	6
(El Salvador) Marcelo Arévalo	1	1
Alt	(France) Jonathan Eysseric	6	6
5	(Hungary) Attila Balázs	2	3

Qualifying competition
4	(Germany) Yannick Hanfmann	6	6
Alt	(France) Jonathan Eysseric	2	1
