= 2011 Crédit Agricole Suisse Open Gstaad =

- Date: 25–31 July
- Edition: 44th
- Category: ATP World Tour 250 Series
- Draw: 28S / 16D
- Prize money: €398,250
- Location: Gstaad, Switzerland
- Venue: Roy Emerson Arena

Champions

Singles
- (Spain) Marcel Granollers

Doubles
- (Czech Republic) František Čermák / (Slovakia) Filip Polášek
- Swiss Open

The 2011 Crédit Agricole Suisse Open Gstaad was a men's tennis tournament played on outdoor clay courts. It was the 44th edition of the Crédit Agricole Suisse Open Gstaad, and was part of the ATP World Tour 250 Series of the 2011 ATP World Tour. It took place at the Roy Emerson Arena in Gstaad, Switzerland, from 25 July through 31 July 2011. Eighth-seeded Marcel Granollers won the singles title.

== Finals ==
=== Singles ===
(Spain) Marcel Granollers defeated (Spain) Fernando Verdasco, 6–4, 3–6, 6–3

- It was Granollers' 1st title of the year and 2nd of his career.

=== Doubles ===
(Czech Republic) František Čermák / (Slovakia) Filip Polášek defeated (Germany) Christopher Kas / (Austria) Alexander Peya, 6–3, 7–6^{(9–7)}

== Entrants ==
=== Seeds ===
Country	Player	Ranking*	Seeding
ESP	Nicolás Almagro	14	1
SUI	Stanislas Wawrinka	16	2
RUS	Mikhail Youzhny	17	3
ESP	Fernando Verdasco	22	4
ESP	Feliciano López	24	5
ESP	Guillermo García-López	37	6
ESP	Pablo Andújar	44	7
ESP	Marcel Granollers	47	8

*Seedings based on the July 18, 2011 rankings.

=== Other entrants ===
The following players received wildcards into the singles main draw:

- (Switzerland) Stéphane Bohli
- (Switzerland) Michael Lammer
- (Switzerland) Alexander Sadecky

The following players received entry from the qualifying draw:

- (Austria) Martin Fischer
- (Australia) Peter Luczak
- (Switzerland) Yann Marti
- (Brazil) João Souza
