= 2014 Crédit Agricole Suisse Open Gstaad – Doubles =

Doubles
- 2014 Crédit Agricole Suisse Open Gstaad

Final
- Champions: (Germany) Andre Begemann (Netherlands) Robin Haase
- Runners-up: (Australia) Rameez Junaid (Slovakia) Michal Mertiňák
- Score: 6–3, 6–4

Details
- Draw: 16
- Seeds: 4

Events
Singles	Doubles
- Swiss Open

Jamie Murray and John Peers were the defending champions, but lost in the quarterfinals to Facundo Bagnis and Federico Delbonis.
Andre Begemann and Robin Haase won the title, defeating Rameez Junaid and Michal Mertiňák in the final, 6–3, 6–4.

== Seeds ==
1. (United Kingdom) Jamie Murray / (Australia) John Peers (quarterfinals)
2. (Croatia) Marin Draganja / (Romania) Florin Mergea (first round)
3. (Germany) Andre Begemann / (Netherlands) Robin Haase (champions)
4. (Sweden) Johan Brunström / (United States) Nicholas Monroe (quarterfinals)

== Draw ==
Key

- Q = Qualifier
- WC = Wild card
- LL = Lucky loser
- Alt = Alternate
- ITF = ITF entry
- PR = Protected ranking
- SR = Special ranking
- SE = Special exempt
- JE = Junior exempt
- JR = Junior Accelerator Programme entrant
- CO = College Accelerator Programme entrant
- NG = Next Gen Accelerator Program entrant
- w/o = Walkover
- r = Retired
- d = Defaulted

=== Draw ===
First round
1	(United Kingdom) J Murray (Australia) J Peers	6	6
(Italy) D Bracciali (Kazakhstan) A Golubev	3	4
WC	(Switzerland) A Bossel (Switzerland) M Lammer	2	7	[5]
(Argentina) F Bagnis (Argentina) F Delbonis	6	5	[10]
3	(Germany) A Begemann (Netherlands) R Haase	6	6
WC	(Switzerland) H Laaksonen (Switzerland) Y Marti	3	2
(Germany) P Marx (Slovenia) B Rola	6	6
(Germany) D Brown (Austria) D Thiem	3	4
(Australia) R Junaid (Slovakia) M Mertiňák	6	3	[10]
(Poland) T Bednarek (Finland) H Kontinen	3	6	[8]
(Spain) M Granollers (Argentina) E Schwank	7	3	[9]
4	(Sweden) J Brunström (United States) N Monroe	5	6	[11]
(Germany) M Emmrich (Germany) C Kas	6	6^{6}	[9]
(Spain) P Andújar (Argentina) J Mónaco	2	7^{8}	[11]
(Germany) D Meffert (Austria) P Oswald	7	7
2	(Croatia) M Draganja (Romania) F Mergea	5	5

Quarterfinals
1	(United Kingdom) J Murray (Australia) J Peers	7	4	[9]
(Argentina) F Bagnis (Argentina) F Delbonis	5	6	[11]
3	(Germany) A Begemann (Netherlands) R Haase	6	6
(Germany) P Marx (Slovenia) B Rola	1	4
(Australia) R Junaid (Slovakia) M Mertiňák	7^{7}	3	[14]
4	(Sweden) J Brunström (United States) N Monroe	6^{5}	6	[12]
(Spain) P Andújar (Argentina) J Mónaco	7^{7}	6
(Germany) D Meffert (Austria) P Oswald	6^{3}	4

Semifinals
(Argentina) F Bagnis (Argentina) F Delbonis	3	4
3	(Germany) A Begemann (Netherlands) R Haase	6	6
(Australia) R Junaid (Slovakia) M Mertiňák	6	6
(Spain) P Andújar (Argentina) J Mónaco	3	1

Final
3	(Germany) A Begemann (Netherlands) R Haase	6	6
(Australia) R Junaid (Slovakia) M Mertiňák	3	4
