= Swiss Open (tennis) =

Tennis tournament held in Gstaad, Switzerland

Coordinates: 46.476°N 7.284°E

Swiss Open Gstaad

ATP Tour
- Event name: EFG Swiss Open Gstaad
- Founded: 1915; 111 years ago
- Location: Gstaad; Switzerland
- Venue: Roy Emerson Arena
- Category: ATP Tour 250 / ATP International Series / ATP World Series (1990–present); Grand Prix Tour (1971–1989)
- Surface: Clay / outdoors
- Draw: 28S/16Q/16D
- Prize money: €596,035 (2025)
- Website: swissopengstaad.ch

Current champions (2026)
- Singles: (Greece) Stefanos Tsitsipas
- Doubles: (Australia) Marc Polmans / (Austria) Lucas Miedler

The Swiss Open Gstaad, sponsored by EFG, is a tennis tournament held in Gstaad, Switzerland. The tournament is played on outdoor clay courts. It is currently part of the ATP Tour schedule as an ATP Tour 250 series event. It is the eighth oldest tennis tournament in the world. Between 1971 and 1989 it was an event of the Grand Prix tennis circuit.

== History ==
The Swiss International Championships was founded in 1897 and staged at the Grasshopper Club, Zurich under the auspices of the Swiss Lawn Tennis Association. In 1898 the Swiss Lawn Tennis Association staged the event at Château-d'Œx. In 1899 an open women's singles event was added to the schedule, when the venue was still in Saint Moritz. It was then hosted at multiple locations throughout its run including Gstaad. The first edition of the Gstaad International tournament was played in 1915 at the Gstaad Palace Hotel, which was known at the time as the Royal Hotel, Winter & Gstaad Palace, and was organized in collaboration with the Lawn Tennis Club (LTC) Gstaad. The first event was played on clay courts and was won by Victor de Coubasch. For the years 1937,48–49, 52, 54–55, 57–58, 60–61, 63, 66–67 this tournament was valid as the Swiss International Championships. In 1969 it became known as the Swiss Open Championships.

The Swiss International Championships were staged at the following locations throughout its run including Basel, Champéry, Geneva, Gstaad, Les Avants, Montreux, Lausanne, Lugano, Lucerne, Ragatz, St. Moritz, Zermatt, and Zurich from 1897 to 1967.

Gstaad is located 1,050 metres (3,450 feet) above sea level. It is the highest venue for ATP Tour events in Europe, although lower than the Ecuador Open and the former Colombia Open, both held at the Andes.

== Past finals ==
=== Singles ===
Year	Champions	Runners-up	Score
For historical winners of this event see Swiss International Championships 1897–1914
Gstaad Championships
1915	(Russia) Victor de Coubasch	(Switzerland) Charles Barde	8–6, 6–2, 3–6, 2–6, 6–3
Incomplete roll (1916–1930, 32,34)
Gstaad Championships
1931	(Switzerland) Hector Fisher	(Switzerland) Charles Aeschlimann	6–1, 6–1, 6–1
1933	(Switzerland) Hector Fisher	(Switzerland) Boris Maneff	6–1, 6–3, 6–1
1935	(Switzerland) Max Ellmer	(Switzerland) M Bertman	6–1, 6–3, 6–4
1936	(Switzerland) Wernher Steiner	(France) Guy Troncin	?
1937	(France) Guy Troncin	(Switzerland) Boris Maneff	6–4, 6–4, 6–4
1938	(Switzerland) Boris Maneff	(France) André Jacquemet	6–0, 3–6, 6–2, 6–3
1939	(Switzerland) Boris Maneff	(Spain) Mario Szavoszt	6–3, 7–5
1940	(Switzerland) Hans Pfaff	(Switzerland) Hector Cosmo Fisher	6–3, 2–6, 6–4
1941	(Switzerland) Jost Spitzer	(Switzerland) Georges Grange	6-3 6-3 6-2
Swiss International Championships
1942	(Switzerland) Hans Pfaff	(Switzerland) Jost Spitzer	6–2, 6–4, 6–3
Gstaad International
1943	(Switzerland) Jost Spitzer	(Switzerland) René Buser	5–7, 8–6, 1–6, 6–3, 6–4
1944	(Switzerland) Boris Maneff	(Switzerland) Jost Spitzer	6–0, 6–2, 6–2
1945	(Switzerland) Boris Maneff	(Monaco) Aleco Noghes	6–3, 6–4, 7–5
1946	(Czechoslovakia) Vladimír Černík	(Czechoslovakia) Bohuslav Hykš	6–0, 0–6, 1–6, 6–4, 6–2
1947	(Italy) Marcello Del Bello	(Italy) Mario Belardinelli	walkover
1948	Semifinals and final not played		
1949	(United States) Earl Cochell	(Czechoslovakia) Jaroslav Drobný	3–6, 6–3, 2–6, 6–3, 7–5
1950	(Czechoslovakia) Vladimír Černík	(India) Sumant Misra	6–1, 2–6, 6–8, 6–4, 6–3
1951	(South Africa) Russell Seymour	(South Africa) Syd Levy	2–6, 6–3, 7–5, 1–6, 6-4
Swiss International Championships
1952	(United States) Herbert Flam	(United States) Irvin Dorfman	6–4, 6–2, 6–1
1953	Semifinals and final not played		
1954	(Australia) Lew Hoad	(Australia) Neale Fraser	6–4, 11–9, 6–4
1955	(United States) Arthur Larsen	(Argentina) Enrique Morea	6–4, 2–6, 6–2, 6–2
Gstaad International
1956	(Egypt) Jaroslav Drobný	(Australia) Neale Fraser	7–5, 6–3, 6–3
Swiss International Championships
1957	(United States) Budge Patty	(Egypt) Jaroslav Drobný	3–6, 6–3, 6–3, 6–1
1958	(Australia) Ashley Cooper	(Australia) Neale Fraser	2–6, 3–6, 7–5, 6–4, 6–3
Gstaad International
1959	(Chile) Luis Ayala	(Sweden) Jan-Erik Lundqvist	6–1, 6–2, 6–1
Swiss International Championships
1960	(Australia) Roy Emerson	(United Kingdom) Mike Davies	6–4, 9–7, 6–2
1961	(Australia) Roy Emerson	(Chile) Luis Ayala	6–3, 6–1, 6–0
Gstaad International
1962	(Australia) Rod Laver	(Australia) Neale Fraser	6–4, 6–4, 8–6
Swiss International Championships
1963	(Italy) Nicola Pietrangeli	(Australia) Roy Emerson	7–5, 6–2, 6–2
Gstaad International
1964	(Brazil) Thomaz Koch	(Brazil) Ronald Barnes	6–3, 6–1, 7–9, 7–5
1965	(Chile) Patricio Rodríguez	(Brazil) Thomaz Koch	2–6, 6–3, 6–2, 6–2
Swiss International Championships
1966	(Australia) Roy Emerson	(Spain) Manuel Santana	5–7, 7–5, 6–3
1967	(Australia) Roy Emerson	(Spain) Manuel Santana	6–2, 8–6, 6–4
Gstaad Championships
1968	(South Africa) Cliff Drysdale	(Netherlands) Tom Okker	6–3, 6–3, 6–0
↓ Open era ↓
Swiss Open Championships
1969	(Australia) Roy Emerson	(Netherlands) Tom Okker	6–1, 12–14, 6–4, 6–4
1970	(Australia) Tony Roche	(Netherlands) Tom Okker	7–5, 7–5, 6–3
↓ Grand Prix circuit ↓
1971	(Australia) John Newcombe	(Netherlands) Tom Okker	6–2, 5–7, 1–6, 7–5, 6–3
1972	(Spain) Andrés Gimeno	(Italy) Adriano Panatta	7–5, 9–8, 6–4
1973	(Romania) Ilie Năstase	(Australia) Roy Emerson	6–4, 6–3, 6–3
1974	(Argentina) Guillermo Vilas	(Spain) Manuel Orantes	6–1, 6–2
1975	(Australia) Ken Rosewall	(West Germany) Karl Meiler	6–4, 6–4, 6–3
1976	(Mexico) Raúl Ramírez	(Italy) Adriano Panatta	7–5, 6–7, 6–1, 6–3
1977	(United States) Jeff Borowiak	(France) Jean-François Caujolle	2–6, 6–1, 6–3
1978	(Argentina) Guillermo Vilas	(Argentina) José Luis Clerc	6–3, 7–6, 6–4
1979	(West Germany) Ulrich Pinner	(Australia) Peter McNamara	6–2, 6–4, 7–5
1980	(Switzerland) Heinz Günthardt	(Australia) Kim Warwick	4–6, 6–4, 7–6
1981	(Poland) Wojciech Fibak	(France) Yannick Noah	6–1, 7–6
1982	(Argentina) José Luis Clerc	(Argentina) Guillermo Vilas	6–1, 6–3, 6–2
1983	(United States) Sandy Mayer	(Czechoslovakia) Tomáš Šmíd	6–0, 6–3, 6–2
1984	(Sweden) Joakim Nyström	(United States) Brian Teacher	6–4, 6–2
1985	(Sweden) Joakim Nyström	(West Germany) Andreas Maurer	6–4, 1–6, 7–5, 6–3
1986	(Sweden) Stefan Edberg	(Switzerland) Roland Stadler	7–5, 4–6, 6–1, 4–6, 6–2
1987	(Spain) Emilio Sánchez	(Haiti) Ronald Agénor	6–2, 6–3, 7–6
1988	(Australia) Darren Cahill	(Switzerland) Jakob Hlasek	6–3, 6–4, 7–6
1989	(West Germany) Carl-Uwe Steeb	(Sweden) Magnus Gustafsson	6–7, 3–6, 6–2, 6–4, 6–2
↓ ATP Tour 250 (Note: Known as World Series from 1990 till 1999 and International Series from 2000 till 2008.) ↓
1990	(Argentina) Martín Jaite	(Spain) Sergi Bruguera	6–3, 6–7, 6–2, 6–2
1991	(Spain) Emilio Sánchez	(Spain) Sergi Bruguera	6–1, 6–4, 6–4
1992	(Spain) Sergi Bruguera	(Spain) Francisco Clavet	6–1, 6–4
1993	(Spain) Sergi Bruguera	(Czech Republic) Karel Nováček	6–3, 6–4
1994	(Spain) Sergi Bruguera	(France) Guy Forget	3–6, 7–5, 6–2, 6–1
1995	(Russia) Yevgeny Kafelnikov	(Switzerland) Jakob Hlasek	6–3, 6–4, 3–6, 6–3
1996	(Spain) Albert Costa	(Spain) Félix Mantilla	4–6, 7–6^{(7–2)}, 6–1, 6–0
1997	(Spain) Félix Mantilla	(Spain) Joan Albert Viloca	6–1, 6–4, 6–4
1998	(Spain) Àlex Corretja	(Germany) Boris Becker	7–6^{(7–5)}, 7–5, 6–3
1999	(Spain) Albert Costa	(Ecuador) Nicolás Lapentti	7–6^{(7–4)}, 6–3, 6–4
2000	(Spain) Àlex Corretja	(Argentina) Mariano Puerta	6–1, 6–3
2001	(Czech Republic) Jiří Novák	(Spain) Juan Carlos Ferrero	6–1, 6–7^{(5–7)}, 7–5
2002	(Spain) Àlex Corretja	(Argentina) Gastón Gaudio	6–3, 7–6^{(7–3)}, 7–6^{(7–3)}
2003	(Czech Republic) Jiří Novák	(Switzerland) Roger Federer	5–7, 6–3, 6–3, 1–6, 6–3
2004	(Switzerland) Roger Federer	(Russia) Igor Andreev	6–2, 6–3, 5–7, 6–3
2005	(Argentina) Gastón Gaudio	(Switzerland) Stan Wawrinka	6–4, 6–4
2006	(France) Richard Gasquet	(Spain) Feliciano López	7–6^{(7–4)}, 6–7^{(3–7)}, 6–3, 6–3
2007	(France) Paul-Henri Mathieu	(Italy) Andreas Seppi	6–7^{(1–7)}, 6–3, 7–5
2008	(Romania) Victor Hănescu	(Russia) Igor Andreev	6–3, 6–4
2009	(Brazil) Thomaz Bellucci	(Germany) Andreas Beck	6–4, 7–6^{(7–2)}
2010	(Spain) Nicolás Almagro	(France) Richard Gasquet	7–5, 6–1
2011	(Spain) Marcel Granollers	(Spain) Fernando Verdasco	6–4, 3–6, 6–3
2012	(Brazil) Thomaz Bellucci	(Serbia) Janko Tipsarević	6–7^{(6–8)}, 6–4, 6–2
2013	(Russia) Mikhail Youzhny	(Netherlands) Robin Haase	6–3, 6–4
2014	(Spain) Pablo Andújar	(Argentina) Juan Mónaco	6–3, 7–5
2015	(Austria) Dominic Thiem	(Belgium) David Goffin	7–5, 6–2
2016	(Spain) Feliciano López	(Netherlands) Robin Haase	6–4, 7–5
2017	(Italy) Fabio Fognini	(Germany) Yannick Hanfmann	6–4, 7–5
2018	(Italy) Matteo Berrettini	(Spain) Roberto Bautista Agut	7–6^{(11–9)}, 6–4
2019	(Spain) Albert Ramos Viñolas	(Germany) Cedrik-Marcel Stebe	6–3, 6–2
2020	Not held due to COVID-19 pandemic		
2021	(Norway) Casper Ruud	(France) Hugo Gaston	6–3, 6–2
2022	(Norway) Casper Ruud	(Italy) Matteo Berrettini	4–6, 7–6^{(7–4)}, 6–2
2023	(Argentina) Pedro Cachin	(Spain) Albert Ramos Viñolas	3–6, 6–0, 7–5
2024	(Italy) Matteo Berrettini	(France) Quentin Halys	6–3, 6–1
2025	(Kazakhstan) Alexander Bublik	(Argentina) Juan Manuel Cerúndolo	6–4, 4–6, 6–3
2026	(Greece) Stefanos Tsitsipas	(Belgium) Raphaël Collignon	6–4, 6–7^{(3–7)}, 6–3

=== Doubles ===
Year	Champions	Runners-up	Score
1968	(Australia) John Newcombe (United States) Dennis Ralston	(Australia) Mal Anderson (Netherlands) Tom Okker	8–10, 12–10, 12–14, 6–3, 6–3
1969	(Netherlands) Tom Okker (United States) Marty Riessen	(Australia) Mal Anderson (Australia) Roy Emerson	6–1, 6–4
1970	(South Africa) Cliff Drysdale (United Kingdom) Roger Taylor	(Netherlands) Tom Okker (United States) Marty Riessen	6–2, 6–3, 6–2
↓ Grand Prix circuit ↓
1971	(Australia) John Alexander (Australia) Phil Dent	(Australia) John Newcombe (Netherlands) Tom Okker	5–7, 6–3, 6–4
1972	(Spain) Andrés Gimeno (Spain) Antonio Muñoz	(Italy) Adriano Panatta (Romania) Ion Țiriac	9–8, 4–6, 6–1, 7–5
1973	doubles not held		
1974	(Spain) José Higueras (Spain) Manuel Orantes	(Australia) Roy Emerson (Brazil) Thomaz Koch	7–5, 0–6, 6–1, 9–8
1975	(Germany) Jürgen Fassbender (Germany) Hans-Jürgen Pohmann	(Rhodesia) Colin Dowdeswell (Australia) Ken Rosewall	6–4, 9–7, 6–1
1976	(Germany) Jürgen Fassbender (Germany) Hans-Jürgen Pohmann	(Italy) Paolo Bertolucci (Italy) Adriano Panatta	7–5, 6–3, 6–3
1977	(Germany) Jürgen Fassbender (Germany) Karl Meiler	(Switzerland) Colin Dowdeswell (South Africa) Bob Hewitt	6–4, 7–6
1978	(Australia) Mark Edmondson (Netherlands) Tom Okker	(South Africa) Bob Hewitt (Australia) Kim Warwick	6–4, 1–6, 6–1, 6–4
1979	(Australia) Mark Edmondson (Australia) John Marks	(Romania) Ion Țiriac (Argentina) Guillermo Vilas	2–6, 6–1, 6–4
1980	(Switzerland) Colin Dowdeswell (Egypt) Ismail El Shafei	(Australia) Mark Edmondson (Australia) Kim Warwick	6–4, 6–4
1981	(Switzerland) Heinz Günthardt (Switzerland) Markus Günthardt	(Australia) David Carter (Australia) Paul Kronk	6–4, 6–1
1982	(United States) Sandy Mayer (United States) Ferdi Taygan	(Switzerland) Heinz Günthardt (Switzerland) Markus Günthardt	6–2, 6–3
1983	(Czech Republic) Pavel Složil (Czech Republic) Tomáš Šmíd	(United Kingdom) Colin Dowdeswell (Poland) Wojciech Fibak	6–7, 6–4, 6–2
1984	(Switzerland) Heinz Günthardt (Switzerland) Markus Günthardt	(Brazil) Givaldo Barbosa (Brazil) João Soares	6–4, 3–6, 7–6
1985	(Poland) Wojciech Fibak (Czech Republic) Tomáš Šmíd	(Australia) Brad Drewett (Australia) Mark Edmondson	6–7, 6–4, 6–4
1986	(Spain) Sergio Casal (Spain) Emilio Sánchez	(Sweden) Stefan Edberg (Sweden) Joakim Nyström	6–3, 3–6, 6–3
1987	(Sweden) Jan Gunnarsson (Czech Republic) Tomáš Šmíd	(France) Loïc Courteau (France) Guy Forget	7–6, 6–2
1988	(Czech Republic) Petr Korda (Czech Republic) Milan Šrejber	(Ecuador) Andrés Gómez (Spain) Emilio Sánchez	7–6, 7–6
1989	(Brazil) Cássio Motta (United States) Todd Witsken	(Czech Republic) Petr Korda (Czech Republic) Milan Šrejber	6–4, 6–3
↓ ATP Tour 250 ↓
1990	(Spain) Sergio Casal (Spain) Emilio Sánchez	(Italy) Omar Camporese (Spain) Javier Sánchez	6–3, 3–6, 7–5
1991	(South Africa) Gary Muller (South Africa) Danie Visser	(France) Guy Forget (Switzerland) Jakob Hlasek	7–6, 6–4
1992	(Netherlands) Hendrik Jan Davids (Czech Republic) Libor Pimek	(Czech Republic) Petr Korda (Czech Republic) Cyril Suk	W/O
1993	(France) Cédric Pioline (Switzerland) Marc Rosset	(Netherlands) Hendrik Jan Davids (South Africa) Piet Norval	6–3, 3–6, 7–6
1994	(Spain) Sergio Casal (Spain) Emilio Sánchez	(Netherlands) Menno Oosting (Czech Republic) Daniel Vacek	7–6, 6–4
1995	(Argentina) Luis Lobo (Spain) Javier Sánchez	(France) Arnaud Boetsch (Switzerland) Marc Rosset	6–7, 7–6, 7–6
1996	(Czech Republic) Jiří Novák (Czech Republic) Pavel Vízner	(United States) Trevor Kronemann (Australia) David Macpherson	4–6, 7–6, 7–6
1997	(Russia) Yevgeny Kafelnikov (Czech Republic) Daniel Vacek	(United States) Trevor Kronemann (Australia) David Macpherson	4–6, 7–6, 6–3
1998	(Brazil) Gustavo Kuerten (Brazil) Fernando Meligeni	(Argentina) Daniel Orsanic (Czech Republic) Cyril Suk	6–4, 7–5
1999	(United States) Donald Johnson (Czech Republic) Cyril Suk	(North Macedonia) Aleksandar Kitinov (Philippines) Eric Taino	7–5, 7–6
2000	(Czech Republic) Jiří Novák (Czech Republic) David Rikl	(France) Jérôme Golmard (Germany) Michael Kohlmann	3–6, 6–3, 6–4
2001	(Switzerland) Roger Federer (Russia) Marat Safin	(Australia) Michael Hill (United States) Jeff Tarango	0–1, retired
2002	(Australia) Joshua Eagle (Czech Republic) David Rikl	(Italy) Massimo Bertolini (Italy) Cristian Brandi	7–6, 6–4
2003	(India) Leander Paes (Czech Republic) David Rikl	(Czech Republic) František Čermák (Czech Republic) Leoš Friedl	6–3, 6–3
2004	(India) Leander Paes (Czech Republic) David Rikl	(Switzerland) Marc Rosset (Switzerland) Stan Wawrinka	6–4, 6–2
2005	(Czech Republic) František Čermák (Czech Republic) Leoš Friedl	(Germany) Michael Kohlmann (Germany) Rainer Schüttler	7–6, 7–6
2006	(Czech Republic) Jiří Novák (Romania) Andrei Pavel	(Switzerland) Marco Chiudinelli (Switzerland) Jean-Claude Scherrer	6–3, 6–1
2007	(Czech Republic) František Čermák (Czech Republic) Pavel Vízner	(France) Marc Gicquel (France) Florent Serra	7–5, 5–7, [10–7]
2008	(Czech Republic) Jaroslav Levinský (Slovakia) Filip Polášek	(Switzerland) Stéphane Bohli (Switzerland) Stan Wawrinka	3–6, 6–2, [11–9]
2009	(Switzerland) Marco Chiudinelli (Switzerland) Michael Lammer	(Czech Republic) Jaroslav Levinský (Slovakia) Filip Polášek	7–5, 6–3
2010	(Sweden) Johan Brunström (Finland) Jarkko Nieminen	(Brazil) Marcelo Melo (Brazil) Bruno Soares	6–3, 6–7^{(4–7)}, [11–9]
2011	(Czech Republic) František Čermák (Slovakia) Filip Polášek	(Germany) Christopher Kas (Austria) Alexander Peya	6–3, 7–6^{(11–9)}
2012	(Spain) Marcel Granollers (Spain) Marc López	(Colombia) Robert Farah (Colombia) Santiago Giraldo	6–4, 7–6^{(11–9)}
2013	(United Kingdom) Jamie Murray (Australia) John Peers	(Spain) Pablo Andújar (Spain) Guillermo García López	6–3, 6–4
2014	(Germany) Andre Begemann (Netherlands) Robin Haase	(Australia) Rameez Junaid (Slovakia) Michal Mertiňák	6–3, 6–4
2015	(Belarus) Aliaksandr Bury (Uzbekistan) Denis Istomin	(Austria) Oliver Marach (Pakistan) Aisam-ul-Haq Qureshi	3–6, 6–2, [10–5]
2016	(Chile) Julio Peralta (Argentina) Horacio Zeballos	(Croatia) Mate Pavić (New Zealand) Michael Venus	7–6^{(7–2)}, 6–2
2017	(Austria) Oliver Marach (Austria) Philipp Oswald	(France) Jonathan Eysseric (Croatia) Franko Škugor	6–3, 4–6, [10–8]
2018	(Italy) Matteo Berrettini (Italy) Daniele Bracciali	(Ukraine) Denys Molchanov (Slovakia) Igor Zelenay	7–6^{(7–2)}, 7–6^{(7–5)}
2019	(Belgium) Sander Gillé (Belgium) Joran Vliegen	(Austria) Philipp Oswald (Slovakia) Filip Polášek	6–4, 6–3
2020	Not held due to COVID-19 pandemic		
2021	(Switzerland) Marc-Andrea Hüsler (Switzerland) Dominic Stricker	(Poland) Szymon Walków (Poland) Jan Zieliński	6–1, 7–6^{(9–7)}
2022	(Bosnia and Herzegovina) Tomislav Brkić (Portugal) Francisco Cabral	(Netherlands) Robin Haase (Austria) Philipp Oswald	6–4, 6–4
2023	(Switzerland) Dominic Stricker (Switzerland) Stan Wawrinka	(Brazil) Marcelo Demoliner (Netherlands) Matwé Middelkoop	7–6^{(10–8)}, 6–2
2024	(India) Yuki Bhambri (France) Albano Olivetti	(France) Ugo Humbert (France) Fabrice Martin	3–6, 6–3, [10–6]
2025	(Portugal) Francisco Cabral (Austria) Lucas Miedler	(Germany) Hendrik Jebens (France) Albano Olivetti	6–7^{(4–7)}, 7–6^{(7–4)}, [10–3]
2026	(Austria) Lucas Miedler (Australia) Marc Polmans	(Brazil) Marcelo Demoliner (United States) Robert Galloway	6–4, 6–3

== See also ==
- Swiss Indoors – men's indoors tournament
- WTA Swiss Open – women's tournament
