= Stan Wawrinka career statistics =

Career finals
Discipline	Type	Won	Lost	Total	WR
Singles
Singles	Grand Slam	3	1	4	0.75
Singles	ATP Finals	–	–	–	–
Singles	ATP 1000	1	3	4	0.25
Singles	ATP 500	3	3	6	0.50
Singles	ATP 250	9	8	17	0.53
Singles	Olympics	–	–	–	–
Singles	Total	16	15	31	0.52
Doubles
Doubles	Grand Slam	–	–	–	–
Doubles	ATP Finals	–	–	–	–
Doubles	ATP 1000	0	1	1	0.00
Doubles	ATP 500	–	–	–	–
Doubles	ATP 250	2	3	5	0.40
Doubles	Olympics	1	0	1	1.00
Doubles	Total	3	4	7	0.43
Total		19	19	38	0.50

This is a list of the main career statistics of Swiss former professional tennis player, Stan Wawrinka. To date, Wawrinka has won sixteen ATP singles titles, including three major singles titles at the 2014 Australian Open, the 2015 French Open, and the 2016 US Open, and one ATP Masters 1000 title at the 2014 Monte-Carlo Rolex Masters. He was also a semifinalist at the 2013 US Open, the 2015 Australian Open, the 2015 US Open, and the 2013, 2014 and 2015 ATP World Tour Finals. He also has reached the quarterfinals at 2014 and 2015 Wimbledon. Wawrinka also won a gold medal partnering Roger Federer in men's doubles for Switzerland in the 2008 Summer Olympics in Beijing, beating Swedish team Simon Aspelin and Thomas Johansson. In 2014 Wawrinka was part of the Swiss National Team, winning the Davis Cup for the first time.

His best singles ranking to date is world No. 3, achieved for the first time on 27 January 2014.

== Performance timelines ==
Key
W	F	SF	QF	#R	RR	Q#	P#	DNQ	A	Z#	PO	G	S	B	NMS	NTI	P	NH

(W) winner; (F) finalist; (SF) semifinalist; (QF) quarterfinalist; (#R) rounds 4, 3, 2, 1; (RR) round-robin stage; (Q#) qualification round; (P#) preliminary round; (DNQ) did not qualify; (A) absent; (Z#) Davis/Fed Cup Zonal Group (with number indication) or (PO) play-off; (G) gold, (S) silver or (B) bronze Olympic/Paralympic medal; (NMS) not a Masters tournament; (NTI) not a Tier I tournament; (P) postponed; (NH) not held; (SR) strike rate (events won / competed); (W–L) win–loss record.
To avoid confusion and double counting, these charts are updated at the conclusion of a tournament or when the player's participation has ended.

=== Singles ===
Tournament	2003	2004	2005	2006	2007	2008	2009	2010	2011	2012	2013	2014	2015	2016	2017	2018	2019	2020	2021	2022	2023	2024	2025	2026	SR	W–L	Win%
Grand Slam tournaments
Australian Open	A	Q1	Q2	2R	3R	2R	3R	3R	QF	3R	4R	W	SF	4R	SF	2R	2R	QF	2R	A	1R	1R	1R	3R	1 / 20	45–19	70%
French Open	A	Q1	3R	1R	2R	3R	3R	4R	4R	4R	QF	1R	W	SF	F	1R	QF	3R	A	1R	2R	2R	1R	1R	1 / 21	46–20	70%
Wimbledon	A	A	1R	3R	1R	4R	4R	1R	2R	1R	1R	QF	QF	2R	1R	2R	2R	NH	A	1R	3R	2R	A	1R	0 / 19	23–19	55%
US Open	A	Q2	3R	3R	4R	4R	1R	QF	2R	4R	SF	QF	SF	W	A	3R	QF	A	A	1R	3R	1R	A	1R	1 / 18	46–17	73%
Win–loss	0–0	0–0	4–3	5–4	6–4	9–4	7–4	9–4	9–4	8–4	12–4	13–3	21–3	16–3	11–3	4–4	10–4	6–2	1–1	0–3	7–4	2–4	0–2	2–4	3 / 78	160–75	68%
Year-end championships
ATP Finals	DNQ										SF	SF	SF	RR	A	DNQ									0 / 4	7–8	47%
National representation
Summer Olympics	NH	A	NH			2R	NH			1R	NH			A	NH				A	NH		2R	NH		0 / 3	2–3	40%
Davis Cup	A	QF	1R	1R	PO	PO	1R	1R	PO	1R	1R	W	PO	1R	A	A	A	A	A	A	RR	A	A	WI	1 / 14	24–16	60%
ATP Masters 1000
Indian Wells Open	A	A	A	2R	A	QF	4R	A	QF	3R	4R	4R	2R	4R	F	A	3R	NH	A	A	4R	1R	A	A	0 / 13	27–13	68%
Miami Open	A	A	A	2R	A	2R	4R	3R	2R	A	A	4R	3R	2R	4R	A	2R	NH	A	A	A	A	A	A	0 / 10	9–10	47%
Monte-Carlo Masters	A	A	Q2	1R	A	1R	SF	3R	A	QF	QF	W	3R	QF	3R	A	2R	NH	A	1R	2R	1R	1R	1R	1 / 16	22–14	61%
Madrid Open	A	A	A	A	1R	3R	3R	3R	1R	3R	F	2R	3R	2R	2R	A	QF	NH	A	A	2R	A	A	A	0 / 13	17–13	57%
Italian Open	A	A	2R	1R	1R	F	3R	QF	3R	3R	2R	3R	SF	3R	3R	1R	1R	1R	A	3R	2R	A	A	Q2	0 / 18	25–17	60%
Hamburg Masters	A	A	Q1	1R	1R	2R	ATP Tour 500																		0 / 3	1–3	25%
Canadian Open	A	A	1R	A	2R	3R	3R	2R	QF	A	2R	3R	2R	SF	A	3R	2R	NH	A	1R	A	A	A	A	0 / 13	16–13	55%
Cincinnati Open	A	A	Q1	3R	1R	A	1R	2R	1R	SF	2R	QF	QF	3R	A	QF	2R	A	A	1R	3R	A	A	A	0 / 14	19–14	58%
Shanghai Masters	NH						3R	2R	3R	3R	QF	2R	QF	3R	A	1R	A	NH			1R	2R	1R	A	0 / 12	13–12	52%
Paris Masters	A	A	2R	2R	3R	2R	1R	3R	1R	3R	QF	3R	SF	2R	A	A	3R	QF	A	1R	1R	A	A	A	0 / 16	17–16	53%
Win–loss	0–0	0–0	2–3	5–7	3–6	13–8	16–9	13–8	10–8	15–7	16–7	13–8	13–9	10–9	9–5	5–4	9–8	3–2	0–0	2–5	8–7	1–3	0–2	0–1	1 / 128	166–126	57%
Career statistics
	2003	2004	2005	2006	2007	2008	2009	2010	2011	2012	2013	2014	2015	2016	2017	2018	2019	2020	2021	2022	2023	2024	2025	2026	Career		
Tournaments	4	6	14	24	22	21	19	18	20	19	23	18	22	21	12	17	20	8	4	14	20	17	13	14	Career total: 390		
Titles	0	0	0	1	0	0	0	1	1	0	1	3	4	4	1	0	0	0	0	0	0	0	0	0	Career total: 16		
Finals	0	0	1	1	2	2	0	2	1	0	4	3	4	5	3	0	2	0	0	0	1	0	0	0	Career total: 31		
Hardcourt win–loss	0–0	0–1	3–8	13–11	16–12	19–14	15–12	19–12	22–10	16–9	23–14	26–12	37–12	33–12	14–5	14–11	23–12	13–6	3–3	5–8	16–15	5–8	2–7	7–12	9 / 221	345–226	60%
Clay win–loss	2–3	0–5	12–4	13–7	5–7	14–6	13–7	17–6	11–7	19–9	24–7	6–3	13–4	12–4	12–4	1–3	8–5	2–2	0–0	2–4	9–7	4–8	2–6	1–6	7 / 127	202–124	62%
Grass win–loss	0–0	0–0	0–2	2–3	0–3	3–1	3–1	0–1	2–3	0–2	4–2	7–2	5–2	1–2	0–2	2–3	2–2	0–0	0–0	1–2	2–1	1–1	0–0	0–1	0 / 35	35–36	49%
Carpet win–loss	0–1	0–1	1–2	5–3	0–2	2–0	Discontinued																		0 / 7	8–9	47%
Overall W–L	2–4	0–7	16–16	33–24	21–24	38–21	31–20	36–19	36–20	35–20	51–23	39–17	55–18	46–18	26–11	17–17	33–19	15–8	3–3	8–14	27–23	10–17	4–13	8–19	16 / 390	590–395	60%
Win (%)	33%	0%	50%	58%	47%	64%	61%	65%	64%	64%	69%	70%	75%	72%	70%	50%	63%	65%	50%	36%	54%	37%	24%	30%	Career total: 60%		
Year-end ranking (Note: 2002 ATP ranking: 660)	171	168	54	30	36	13	21	21	17	17	8	4	4	4	9	66	16	18	82	151	49	161	157		$38,742,890		

=== Doubles ===
Tournament	2003	2004	2005	2006	2007	2008	2009	2010	2011	2012	2013	2014	2015	2016	2017	2018	2019	2020	2021	2022	2023	2024	2025	2026	SR	W–L	Win%
Grand Slam tournaments
Australian Open	A	A	A	3R	A	A	A	A	A	A	A	A	A	A	A	A	A	A	A	A	A	A	A	A	0 / 1	2–1	66%
French Open	A	A	A	3R	1R	A	A	A	A	A	A	A	A	A	A	A	A	A	A	A	A	A	A	A	0 / 2	2–2	50%
Wimbledon	A	A	A	1R	1R	A	A	A	A	A	A	A	A	A	A	A	A	A	A	A	A	A	A	A	0 / 2	0–2	0%
US Open	A	A	1R	A	A	A	A	A	A	A	A	A	A	A	A	A	A	A	A	A	A	A	A	A	0 / 1	0–1	0%
Win–loss	0–0	0–0	0–1	4–3	0–2	0–0	0–0	0–0	0–0	0–0	0–0	0–0	0–0	0–0	0–0	0–0	0–0	0–0	0–0	0–0	0–0	0–0	0–0	0–0	0 / 6	4–6	40%
National representation
Olympic Games	NH	A	Not Held			G	Not Held			2R	Not Held			A	Not Held				A	Not Held		A	Not Held		1 / 2	7–1	88%
Davis Cup	A	A	A	1R	A	PO	1R	1R	PO	1R	1R	W	A	A	A	A	A	A	A	A	RR	A	A	A	1 / 9	4–15	21%
ATP Masters 1000
Indian Wells Open	A	A	A	1R	A	1R	SF	A	F	A	1R	SF	1R	A	1R	A	2R	NH	A	A	2R	A	A	A	0 / 10	10–9	53%
Monte-Carlo Masters	A	A	A	A	A	A	2R	1R	A	QF	1R	A	QF	A	2R	A	1R	NH	A	1R	1R	A	A	A	0 / 9	6–8	43%
Italian Open	A	A	A	A	1R	1R	A	1R	1R	A	A	A	A	A	A	A	A	A	A	A	A	A	A	A	0 / 4	0–4	0%
Hamburg Masters	A	A	A	A	1R	A	ATP Tour 500																		0 / 1	0–1	0%
Canadian Open	A	A	A	A	A	2R	1R	A	QF	A	1R	2R	A	2R	A	A	QF	NH	A	1R	A	A	A	A	0 / 8	7–7	50%
Cincinnati Open	A	A	A	A	A	A	A	A	A	2R	1R	A	QF	A	A	A	A	A	A	1R	A	A	A	A	0 / 4	3–4	43%
Paris Masters	A	A	A	A	A	A	A	A	A	1R	A	QF	A	A	A	A	A	A	A	A	A	A	A	A	0 / 2	2–2	50%
Win–loss	0–0	0–0	0–0	0–1	0–2	1–3	3–2	0–2	6–3	3–3	0–4	6–3	4–3	1–1	1–2	0–0	3–2	0–0	0–0	0–3	0–1	0–0	0–0	0–0	0 / 38	28–35	44%

== Grand Slam tournament finals ==
=== Singles: 4 (3 titles, 1 runner-up) ===
Result	Year	Tournament	Surface	Opponent	Score
Win	2014	Australian Open	Hard	(Spain) Rafael Nadal	6–3, 6–2, 3–6, 6–3
Win	2015	French Open	Clay	(Serbia) Novak Djokovic	4–6, 6–4, 6–3, 6–4
Win	2016	US Open	Hard	(Serbia) Novak Djokovic	6–7^{(1–7)}, 6–4, 7–5, 6–3
Loss	2017	French Open	Clay	(Spain) Rafael Nadal	2–6, 3–6, 1–6

== Other significant finals ==
=== Olympics finals ===
==== Doubles: 1 (1 gold medal) ====
Result	Year	Tournament	Surface	Partner	Opponents	Score
Gold	2008	Summer Olympics	Hard	(Switzerland) Roger Federer	(Sweden) Simon Aspelin (Sweden) Thomas Johansson	6–3, 6–4, 6–7^{(4–7)}, 6–3

=== Masters 1000 finals ===
==== Singles: 4 (1 title, 3 runner-ups) ====
Result	Year	Tournament	Surface	Opponent	Score
Loss	2008	Italian Open	Clay	(Serbia) Novak Djokovic	6–4, 3–6, 3–6
Loss	2013	Madrid Open	Clay	(Spain) Rafael Nadal	2–6, 4–6
Win	2014	Monte-Carlo Masters	Clay	(Switzerland) Roger Federer	4–6, 7–6^{(7–5)}, 6–2
Loss	2017	Indian Wells Masters	Hard	(Switzerland) Roger Federer	4–6, 5–7

==== Doubles: 1 (1 runner-up) ====
Result	Year	Tournament	Surface	Partner	Opponents	Score
Loss	2011	Indian Wells Masters	Hard	(Switzerland) Roger Federer	(Ukraine) Alexandr Dolgopolov (Belgium) Xavier Malisse	4–6, 7–6^{(7–5)}, [7–10]

== ATP career finals ==
=== Singles: 31 (16 titles, 15 runner-ups) ===
Legend Grand Slam (3–1) Summer Olympics (0–0) ATP World Tour Finals (0–0) ATP World Tour Masters 1000 (1–3) ATP World Tour 500 Series (3–3) ATP World Tour 250 Series (9–8)	Finals by surface Hard (9–7) Clay (7–7) Grass (0–1)	Finals by setting Outdoor (15–11) Indoor (1–4)

Result	W–L	Date	Tournament	Tier	Surface	Opponent	Score
Loss	0–1	Jul 2005	Swiss Open, Switzerland	International	Clay	(Argentina) Gastón Gaudio	4–6, 4–6
Win	1–1	Jul 2006	Croatia Open Umag, Croatia	International	Clay	(Serbia) Novak Djokovic	6–6^{(1–3)}, ret.
Loss	1–2	Jul 2007	Stuttgart Open, Germany	Intl. Gold	Clay	(Spain) Rafael Nadal	4–6, 5–7
Loss	1–3	Oct 2007	Vienna Open, Austria	Intl. Gold	Hard (i)	(Serbia) Novak Djokovic	4–6, 0–6
Loss	1–4	Jan 2008	Qatar Open, Qatar	International	Hard	(United Kingdom) Andy Murray	4–6, 6–4, 2–6
Loss	1–5	May 2008	Italian Open, Italy	Masters	Clay	(Serbia) Novak Djokovic	6–4, 3–6, 3–6
Loss	1–6	Jan 2010	Maharashtra Open, India	250 Series	Hard	(Croatia) Marin Čilić	6–7^{(2–7)}, 6–7^{(3–7)}
Win	2–6	Apr 2010	Grand Prix Hassan II, Morocco	250 Series	Clay	(Romania) Victor Hănescu	6–2, 6–3
Win	3–6	Jan 2011	Maharashtra Open, India	250 Series	Hard	(Belgium) Xavier Malisse	7–5, 4–6, 6–1
Loss	3–7	Feb 2013	Argentina Open, Argentina	250 Series	Clay	(Spain) David Ferrer	4–6, 6–3, 1–6
Win	4–7	May 2013	Portugal Open, Portugal	250 Series	Clay	(Spain) David Ferrer	6–1, 6–4
Loss	4–8	May 2013	Madrid Open, Spain	Masters 1000	Clay	(Spain) Rafael Nadal	2–6, 4–6
Loss	4–9	Jun 2013	Rosmalen Championships, Netherlands	250 Series	Grass	(France) Nicolas Mahut	3–6, 4–6
Win	5–9	Jan 2014	Maharashtra Open, India (2)	250 Series	Hard	(France) Édouard Roger-Vasselin	7–5, 6–2
Win	6–9	Jan 2014	Australian Open, Australia	Grand Slam	Hard	(Spain) Rafael Nadal	6–3, 6–2, 3–6, 6–3
Win	7–9	Apr 2014	Monte-Carlo Masters, Monaco	Masters 1000	Clay	(Switzerland) Roger Federer	4–6, 7–6^{(7–5)}, 6–2
Win	8–9	Jan 2015	Maharashtra Open, India (3)	250 Series	Hard	(Slovenia) Aljaž Bedene	6–3, 6–4
Win	9–9	Feb 2015	Rotterdam Open, Netherlands	500 Series	Hard (i)	(Czech Republic) Tomáš Berdych	4–6, 6–3, 6–4
Win	10–9	Jun 2015	French Open, France	Grand Slam	Clay	(Serbia) Novak Djokovic	4–6, 6–4, 6–3, 6–4
Win	11–9	Oct 2015	Japan Open, Japan	500 Series	Hard	(France) Benoît Paire	6–2, 6–4
Win	12–9	Jan 2016	Maharashtra Open, India (4)	250 Series	Hard	(Croatia) Borna Ćorić	6–3, 7–5
Win	13–9	Feb 2016	Dubai Championships, UAE	500 Series	Hard	(Cyprus) Marcos Baghdatis	6–4, 7–6^{(15–13)}
Win	14–9	May 2016	Geneva Open, Switzerland	250 Series	Clay	(Croatia) Marin Čilić	6–4, 7–6^{(13–11)}
Win	15–9	Sep 2016	US Open, United States	Grand Slam	Hard	(Serbia) Novak Djokovic	6–7^{(1–7)}, 6–4, 7–5, 6–3
Loss	15–10	Sep 2016	St. Petersburg Open, Russia	250 Series	Hard (i)	(Germany) Alexander Zverev	2–6, 6–3, 5–7
Loss	15–11	Mar 2017	Indian Wells Masters, United States	Masters 1000	Hard	(Switzerland) Roger Federer	4–6, 5–7
Win	16–11	May 2017	Geneva Open, Switzerland (2)	250 Series	Clay	(Germany) Mischa Zverev	4–6, 6–3, 6–3
Loss	16–12	Jun 2017	French Open, France	Grand Slam	Clay	(Spain) Rafael Nadal	2–6, 3–6, 1–6
Loss	16–13	Feb 2019	Rotterdam Open, Netherlands	500 Series	Hard (i)	(France) Gaël Monfils	3–6, 6–1, 2–6
Loss	16–14	Oct 2019	European Open, Belgium	250 Series	Hard (i)	(United Kingdom) Andy Murray	6–3, 4–6, 4–6
Loss	16–15	Jul 2023	Croatia Open, Croatia	250 Series	Clay	(Australia) Alexei Popyrin	7–6^{(7–5)}, 3–6, 4–6

=== Doubles: 7 (3 titles, 4 runner-ups) ===
Legend Grand Slam (0–0) Summer Olympics (1–0) ATP World Tour Finals (0–0) ATP World Tour Masters 1000 (0–1) ATP World Tour 500 Series (0–0) ATP World Tour 250 Series (2–3)	Finals by surface Hard (2–2) Clay (1–2) Grass (0–0) Carpet (0–0)	Finals by setting Outdoor (3–4) Indoor (0–0)

Result	W–L	Date	Tournament	Tier	Surface	Partner	Opponents	Score
Loss	0–1	Jul 2004	Swiss Open, Switzerland	International	Clay	(Switzerland) Marc Rosset	(India) Leander Paes (Czech Republic) David Rikl	4–6, 2–6
Loss	0–2	Jul 2008	Swiss Open, Switzerland	International	Clay	(Switzerland) Stéphane Bohli	(Czech Republic) Jaroslav Levinský (Slovakia) Filip Polášek	6–3, 2–6, [9–11]
Win	1–2	Aug 2008	Summer Olympics Beijing, China	Olympics	Hard	(Switzerland) Roger Federer	(Sweden) Simon Aspelin (Sweden) Thomas Johansson	6–3, 6–4, 6–7^{(4–7)}, 6–3
Loss	1–3	Jan 2009	Maharashtra Open, India	250 Series	Hard	(Switzerland) Jean-Claude Scherrer	(United States) Eric Butorac (United States) Rajeev Ram	3–6, 4–6
Loss	1–4	Mar 2011	Indian Wells Masters, United States	Masters 1000	Hard	(Switzerland) Roger Federer	(Ukraine) Alexandr Dolgopolov (Belgium) Xavier Malisse	4–6, 7–6^{(7–5)}, [7–10]
Win	2–4	Jan 2013	Maharashtra Open, India	250 Series	Hard	(France) Benoît Paire	(Germany) Andre Begemann (Germany) Martin Emmrich	6–2, 6–1
Win	3–4	Jul 2023	Swiss Open, Switzerland	250 Series	Clay	(Switzerland) Dominic Stricker	(Brazil) Marcelo Demoliner (Netherlands) Matwé Middelkoop	7–6^{(10–8)}, 6–2

== ATP Challenger and ITF Futures finals ==
=== Singles: 12 (7 titles, 5 runner-ups) ===
Legend ATP Challenger Tour (7–4) ITF Futures Tour (0–1)	Finals by surface Hard (0–2) Clay (7–3) Grass (0–0)	Finals by setting Outdoor (7–4) Indoor (0–1)

Result	W–L	Date	Tournament	Tier	Surface	Opponent	Score
Win	1–0	Aug 2003	San Benedetto Del Tronto, Italy	Challenger	Clay	(Spain) Salvador Navarro	6–1, 4–6, 6–4
Win	2–0	Aug 2003	Geneva, Switzerland	Challenger	Clay	(Spain) Emilio Benfele Álvarez	6–1, 7–5
Win	3–0	Apr 2004	Barcelona, Spain	Challenger	Clay	(Belgium) Kristof Vliegen	6–4, 6–3
Loss	3–1	Aug 2004	St. Petersburg, Russia	Challenger	Clay	(Monaco) Jean-René Lisnard	6–3, 5–7, 5–7
Win	4–1	Aug 2004	Geneva, Switzerland (2)	Challenger	Clay	(Belgium) Christophe Rochus	4–6, 6–4, ret.
Loss	4–2	Feb 2005	Andrézieux, France	Challenger	Hard	(France) Thierry Ascione	1–6, 3–6
Win	5–2	Jun 2009	Lugano, Switzerland	Challenger	Clay	(Italy) Potito Starace	7–5, 6–3
Win	6–2	Jun 2010	Lugano, Switzerland (2)	Challenger	Clay	(Italy) Potito Starace	6–7^{(2–7)}, 6–2, 6–1
Win	7–2	Aug 2020	Prague, Czech Republic	Challenger	Clay	(Russia) Aslan Karatsev	7–6^{(7–2)}, 6–4
Loss	7–3	May 2025	Aix-en-Provence, France	Challenger	Clay	(Croatia) Borna Ćorić	7–6^{(7–5)}, 3–6, 6–7^{(4–7)}
Loss	7–4	Sep 2025	Rennes, France	Challenger	Hard (i)	(France) Hugo Gaston	4–6, 4–6
Loss	0–1	Mar 2003	Spain F4, Cartagena	Futures	Clay	(Spain) Iván Navarro	7–6^{(7–5)}, 4–6, 0–6

=== Doubles: 1 (1 title) ===
Legend ATP Challenger Tour (0–0) ITF Futures Tour (1–0)	Finals by surface Hard (1–0) Clay (0–0) Grass (0–0)	Finals by setting Outdoor (1–0) Indoor (0–0)

Result	W–L	Date	Tournament	Tier	Surface	Partner	Opponents	Score
Win	1–0	Oct 2001	Spain F13, Martos	Futures	Hard	(France) Gregory Zavialoff	(Spain) Jaime García (Spain) Marcos Jiménez	4–6, 6–3, 6–4

== Team competitions ==
Result	W–L	Date	Tournament	Surface	Partners	Opponents	Score
Win	1–0	21–23 November 2014	Davis Cup, Lille, France	Clay (i)	(Switzerland) Roger Federer (Switzerland) Marco Chiudinelli (Switzerland) Michael Lammer	(France) Jo-Wilfried Tsonga (France) Gaël Monfils (France) Julien Benneteau (France) Richard Gasquet	3–1
Loss	1–1	Jan 2026	United Cup	Hard	(Switzerland) Belinda Bencic (Switzerland) Jakub Paul	(Poland) Hubert Hurkacz (Poland) Iga Świątek (Poland) Jan Zieliński (Poland) Katarzyna Kawa	1–2

== Junior Grand Slam finals ==
=== Singles: 1 (1 title) ===
Result	Year	Tournament	Surface	Opponent	Score
Win	2003	French Open	Clay	(United States) Brian Baker	7–5, 4–6, 6–3

== Records accomplished in the Open Era (Circa May 1968) ==
Tournament	Time Span	Record Accomplished	Player Tied
Chennai Open	2011–2016	4 men's singles titles overall	Stands Alone
Chennai Open	2010–2016	5 finals overall	Stands Alone
Chennai Open	2014–2016	3 consecutive titles	Stands Alone
Chennai Open	2010–2016	5 semifinals overall	Carlos Moyá

== Best Grand Slam results details ==
Australian Open
2014 Australian Open (8th Seed)
Round	Opponent	Rank	Score
1R	(Kazakhstan) Andrey Golubev	85	6–4, 4–1
2R	(Colombia) Alejandro Falla	87	6–3, 6–3, 6–7, 6–4
3R	(Canada) Vasek Pospisil (28)	30	Walkover
4R	(Spain) Tommy Robredo (17)	18	6–3, 7–6, 7–6
QF	(Serbia) Novak Djokovic (2)	2	2–6, 6–4, 6–2, 3–6, 9–7
SF	(Czech Republic) Tomáš Berdych (7)	7	6–3, 6–7, 7–6, 7–6
W	(Spain) Rafael Nadal (1)	1	6–3, 6–2, 3–6, 6–3

Wimbledon
2014 Wimbledon (5th seed)
Round	Opponent	Rank	Score
1R	(Portugal) João Sousa	41	6–3, 6–4, 6–3
2R	(Chinese Taipei) Lu Yen-hsun	47	7–6, 6–3, 3–6, 7–5
3R	(Uzbekistan) Denis Istomin	45	6–3, 6–3, 6–4
4R	(Spain) Feliciano López (19)	26	7–6, 7–6, 6–3
QF	(Switzerland) Roger Federer (4)	4	6–3, 6–7, 4–6, 4–6
2015 Wimbledon (4th seed)
Round	Opponent	Rank	Score
1R	(Portugal) João Sousa	46	6–2, 7–5, 7–6
2R	(Dominican Republic) Víctor Estrella Burgos	48	6–3, 6–4, 7–5
3R	(Spain) Fernando Verdasco	43	6–4, 6–3, 6–4
4R	(Belgium) David Goffin (16)	15	7–6, 7–6, 6–4
QF	(France) Richard Gasquet (21)	20	4–6, 6–4, 6–3, 4–6, 9–11

French Open
2015 French Open (8th Seed)
Round	Opponent	Rank	Score
1R	(Turkey) Marsel İlhan	81	6–3, 6–2, 6–3
2R	(Serbia) Dušan Lajović	67	6–3, 6–4, 5–7, 6–3
3R	(United States) Steve Johnson	56	6–4, 6–3, 6–2
4R	(France) Gilles Simon (12)	13	6–1, 6–4, 6–2
QF	(Switzerland) Roger Federer (2)	2	6–4, 6–3, 7–6
SF	(France) Jo-Wilfried Tsonga (14)	15	6–3, 6–7, 7–6, 6–4
W	(Serbia) Novak Djokovic (1)	1	4–6, 6–4, 6–3, 6–4

US Open
2016 US Open (3rd Seed)
Round	Opponent	Rank	Score
1R	(Spain) Fernando Verdasco	46	7–6, 6–4, 6–4
2R	(Italy) Alessandro Giannessi (Q)	243	6–1, 7–6, 7–5
3R	(United Kingdom) Dan Evans	64	4–6, 6–3, 6–7, 7–6, 6–2
4R	(Ukraine) Illya Marchenko	63	6–4, 6–1, 6–7, 6–3
QF	(Argentina) Juan Martín del Potro (WC)	142	7–6, 4–6, 6–3, 6–2
SF	(Japan) Kei Nishikori (6)	7	4–6, 7–5, 6–4, 6–2
W	(Serbia) Novak Djokovic (1)	1	6–7, 6–4, 7–5, 6–3

== Top 10 wins ==
- He has a 63–107 (37.06%) record against players who were, at the time the match was played, ranked in the top 10.

Season	2005	2006	2007	2008	2009	2010	2011	2012	2013	2014	2015	2016	2017	2018	2019	2020	2021	2022	2023	2024	2025	2026	Total
Wins	1	3	1	4	2	2	3	2	9	8	9	3	3	2	4	2	0	2	2	1	0	0	63

#	Player	Rank	Event	Surface	Rd	Score	SWR
2005
1.	(Argentina) Mariano Puerta	No. 10	US Open, United States	Hard	2R	3–6, 6–4, 6–3, 6–7^{(4–7)}, 6–1	62
2006
2.	(Spain) David Ferrer	No. 10	Zagreb Indoors, Croatia	Carpet (i)	1R	4–6, 6–1, 6–3	49
3.	(Argentina) David Nalbandian	No. 4	Cincinnati Masters, United States	Hard	2R	6–4, 6–2	54
4.	(Argentina) David Nalbandian	No. 3	Swiss Indoors, Switzerland	Carpet (i)	QF	7–6^{(9–7)}, 6–2	40
2007
5.	(Spain) Tommy Robredo	No. 8	Connecticut Open, United States	Hard	3R	6–3, 6–3	57
2008
6.	(Czech Republic) Tomáš Berdych	No. 10	Indian Wells Masters, United States	Hard	2R	2–6, 7–6^{(7–3)}, 6–4	35
7.	(Argentina) David Nalbandian	No. 7	Barcelona Open, Spain	Clay	3R	6–3, 6–1	27
8.	(United States) James Blake	No. 8	Italian Open, Italy	Clay	QF	6–7^{(5–7)}, 7–6^{(7–5)}, 6–1	24
9.	(United States) Andy Roddick	No. 6	Italian Open, Italy	Clay	SF	3–0, ret.	24
2009
10.	(Switzerland) Roger Federer	No. 2	Monte-Carlo Masters, France	Clay	3R	6–4, 7–5	16
11.	(United States) Andy Roddick	No. 6	Shanghai Masters, China	Hard	2R	3–4, ret.	22
2010
12.	(Sweden) Robin Söderling	No. 7	Italian Open, Italy	Clay	3R	6–3, 6–2	26
13.	(United Kingdom) Andy Murray	No. 4	US Open, United States	Hard	3R	6–7^{(3–7)}, 7–6^{(7–4)}, 6–3, 6–3	27
2011
14.	(Czech Republic) Tomáš Berdych	No. 6	Maharashtra Open, India	Hard	SF	6–4, 6–1	21
15.	(United States) Andy Roddick	No. 8	Australian Open, Australia	Hard	4R	6–3, 6–4, 6–4	19
16.	(Czech Republic) Tomáš Berdych	No. 7	Indian Wells Masters, United States	Hard	4R	3–6, 6–4, 6–4	14
2012
17.	(Serbia) Janko Tipsarević	No. 8	Italian Open, Italy	Clay	2R	6–3, 6–1	20
18.	(Spain) David Ferrer	No. 5	Cincinnati Masters, United States	Hard	2R	6–4, 6–1	26
2013
19.	(United Kingdom) Andy Murray	No. 2	Monte-Carlo Masters, France	Clay	3R	6–1, 6–2	17
20.	(Spain) David Ferrer	No. 4	Portugal Open, Portugal	Clay	F	6–1, 6–4	16
21.	(France) Jo-Wilfried Tsonga	No. 8	Madrid Open, Spain	Clay	QF	6–2, 6–7^{(9–11)}, 6–4	15
22.	(Czech Republic) Tomáš Berdych	No. 6	Madrid Open, Spain	Clay	SF	6–3, 4–6, 6–4	15
23.	(France) Richard Gasquet	No. 9	French Open, France	Clay	4R	6–7^{(5–7)}, 4–6, 6–4, 7–5, 8–6	10
24.	(Czech Republic) Tomáš Berdych	No. 5	US Open, United States	Hard	4R	3–6, 6–1, 7–6^{(8–6)}, 6–2	10
25.	(United Kingdom) Andy Murray	No. 3	US Open, United States	Hard	QF	6–4, 6–3, 6–2	10
26.	(Czech Republic) Tomáš Berdych	No. 6	ATP Finals, United Kingdom	Hard (i)	RR	6–3, 6–7^{(0–7)}, 6–3	8
27.	(Spain) David Ferrer	No. 3	ATP Finals, United Kingdom	Hard (i)	RR	6–7^{(3–7)}, 6–4, 6–1	8
2014
28.	(Serbia) Novak Djokovic	No. 2	Australian Open, Australia	Hard	QF	2–6, 6–4, 6–2, 3–6, 9–7	8
29.	(Czech Republic) Tomáš Berdych	No. 7	Australian Open, Australia	Hard	SF	6–3, 6–7^{(1–7)}, 7–6^{(7–3)}, 7–6^{(7–4)}	8
30.	(Spain) Rafael Nadal	No. 1	Australian Open, Australia	Hard	F	6–3, 6–2, 3–6, 6–3	8
31.	(Canada) Milos Raonic	No. 10	Monte-Carlo Masters, France	Clay	QF	7–6^{(7–5)}, 6–2	3
32.	(Spain) David Ferrer	No. 6	Monte-Carlo Masters, France	Clay	SF	6–1, 7–6^{(7–3)}	3
33.	(Switzerland) Roger Federer	No. 4	Monte-Carlo Masters, France	Clay	F	4–6, 7–6^{(7–5)}, 6–2	3
34.	(Czech Republic) Tomáš Berdych	No. 7	ATP Finals, United Kingdom	Hard (i)	RR	6–1, 6–1	4
35.	(Croatia) Marin Čilić	No. 9	ATP Finals, United Kingdom	Hard (i)	RR	6–3, 4–6, 6–3	4
2015
36.	(Japan) Kei Nishikori	No. 5	Australian Open, Australia	Hard	QF	6–3, 6–4, 7–6^{(8–6)}	4
37.	(Canada) Milos Raonic	No. 6	Rotterdam Open, Netherlands	Hard (i)	SF	7–6^{(7–3)}, 7–6^{(9–7)}	8
38.	(Czech Republic) Tomáš Berdych	No. 7	Rotterdam Open, Netherlands	Hard (i)	F	4–6, 6–3, 6–4	8
39.	(Spain) Rafael Nadal	No. 7	Italian Open, Italy	Clay	QF	7–6^{(9–7)}, 6–2	9
40.	(Switzerland) Roger Federer	No. 2	French Open, France	Clay	QF	6–4, 6–3, 7–6^{(7–4)}	9
41.	(Serbia) Novak Djokovic	No. 1	French Open, France	Clay	F	4–6, 6–4, 6–3, 6–4	9
42.	(Spain) Rafael Nadal	No. 6	Paris Masters, France	Hard (i)	QF	7–6^{(10–8)}, 7–6^{(9–7)}	4
43.	(Spain) David Ferrer	No. 7	ATP Finals, United Kingdom	Hard (i)	RR	7–5, 6–2	4
44.	(United Kingdom) Andy Murray	No. 2	ATP Finals, United Kingdom	Hard (i)	RR	7–6^{(7–4)}, 6–4	4
2016
45.	(Japan) Kei Nishikori	No. 7	US Open, United States	Hard	SF	4–6, 7–5, 6–4, 6–2	3
46.	(Serbia) Novak Djokovic	No. 1	US Open, United States	Hard	F	6–7^{(1–7)}, 6–4, 7–5, 6–3	3
47.	(Croatia) Marin Čilić	No. 7	ATP Finals, United Kingdom	Hard (i)	RR	7–6^{(7–3)}, 7–6^{(7–3)}	3
2017
48.	(Austria) Dominic Thiem	No. 9	Indian Wells Masters, United States	Hard	QF	6–4, 4–6, 7–6^{(7–4)}	3
49.	(Croatia) Marin Čilić	No. 8	French Open, France	Clay	QF	6–3, 6–3, 6–1	3
50.	(United Kingdom) Andy Murray	No. 1	French Open, France	Clay	SF	6–7^{(6–8)}, 6–3, 5–7, 7–6^{(7–3)}, 6–1	3
2018
51.	(Bulgaria) Grigor Dimitrov	No. 6	Wimbledon, United Kingdom	Grass	1R	1–6, 7–6^{(7–3)}, 7–6^{(7–5)}, 6–4	224
52.	(Bulgaria) Grigor Dimitrov	No. 8	US Open, United States	Hard	1R	6–3, 6–2, 7–5	101
2019
53.	(Japan) Kei Nishikori	No. 7	Rotterdam Open, Netherlands	Hard (i)	SF	6–2, 4–6, 6–4	68
54.	(Japan) Kei Nishikori	No. 7	Madrid Open, Spain	Clay	3R	6–3, 7–6^{(7–3)}	34
55.	(Greece) Stefanos Tsitsipas	No. 6	French Open, France	Clay	4R	7–6^{(8–6)}, 5–7, 6–4, 3–6, 8–6	28
56.	(Serbia) Novak Djokovic	No. 1	US Open, United States	Hard	4R	6–4, 7–5, 2–1, ret.	24
2020
57.	(Russia) Daniil Medvedev	No. 4	Australian Open, Australia	Hard	4R	6–2, 2–6, 4–6, 7–6^{(7–2)}, 6–2	15
58.	(Russia) Andrey Rublev	No. 8	Paris Masters, France	Hard (i)	4R	1–6, 6–4, 6–3	20
2022
59.	Daniil Medvedev	No. 4	Moselle Open, France	Hard (i)	2R	6–4, 6–7^{(7–9)}, 6–3	284
60.	(Norway) Casper Ruud	No. 3	Swiss Indoors, Switzerland	Hard (i)	1R	6–4, 6–4	194
2023
61.	(Denmark) Holger Rune	No. 8	Indian Wells Masters, United States	Hard	3R	6–2, 6–7^{(5–7)}, 7–5	100
62.	(United States) Frances Tiafoe	No. 10	Cincinnati Masters, United States	Hard	2R	6–3, 6–4	51
2024
63.	Andrey Rublev	No. 7	Stockholm Open, Sweden	Hard (i)	QF	7–6^{(7–5)}, 7–6^{(7–5)}	217

== Career Grand Slam tournament seedings ==
The tournaments won by Wawrinka are in boldface.

Year	Australian Open	French Open	Wimbledon	US Open
2005	A	Q	not seeded	not seeded
2006	not seeded	not seeded	not seeded	not seeded
2007	31st	not seeded	not seeded	not seeded
2008	26th	9th	13th	10th
2009	15th	17th	19th	19th
2010	19th	20th	20th	25th
2011	19th	14th	14th	14th
2012	21st	18th	25th	18th
2013	15th	9th	11th	9th
2014	**8th (1)**	3rd	5th	3rd
2015	4th	**8th (2)**	4th	5th
2016	4th	3rd	4th	**3rd (3)**
2017	4th	3rd	5th	A
2018	9th	23rd	not seeded	WC
2019	not seeded	24th	22nd	23rd
2020	15th	16th	NH	A
2021	17th	A	A	A
2022	A	PR	WC	PR
2023	PR	not seeded	not seeded	not seeded
2024	not seeded	not seeded	not seeded	WC
2025	WC	WC	A	A
2026	WC	not seeded	WC	WC

== Davis Cup (26 wins, 25 losses) ==
Group membership World Group (10–15) WG play-off (10–9) Group I (6–1) Group II (0–0) Group III (0) Group IV (0)	Matches by Surface Hard (14–12) Clay (9–8) Grass (1–2) Carpet (2–3)	Matches by Type Singles (22–13) Doubles (4–12)	Matches by Setting Indoors (23–21) Outdoors (3–4)	Matches by Venue Switzerland (15–11) Away (10–14)

- ▲ ▼ indicates the result of the Davis Cup match followed by the score, date, place of event, the zonal classification and its phase, and the court surface.

Rubber result	No.	Rubber	Match type (partner if any)	Opponent nation	Opponent player(s)	Score
▲3–2; 6–8 February 2004; Sala Polivalenta, Bucharest, Romania; World Group first round; clay(i) surface
Defeat	1	V	Singles (dead rubber)	Romania	Victor Hănescu	3–6, 7–6^{(7–3)}, 3–6
▼2–3; 4–6 March 2005; Expo Centre, Fribourg, Switzerland; World Group first round; hard(i) surface
Defeat	2	II	Singles	Netherlands	Peter Wessels	6–7^{(12–14)}, 7–6^{(7–4)}, 6–7^{(7–9)}, 4–6
Defeat	3	IV	Singles	Netherlands	Sjeng Schalken	6–1, 2–6, 4–6, 6–2, 7–9
▲5–0; 23–25 September 2005; Palexpo, Geneva, Switzerland; World Group play-offs; clay(i) surface
Victory	4	II	Singles	(United Kingdom) Great Britain	Andy Murray	6–3, 7–6^{(7–5)}, 6–4
Victory	5	V	Singles (dead rubber)	(United Kingdom) Great Britain	Alan Mackin	7–5, 7–6^{(7–5)}
▼2–3; 10–12 February 2006; SEG Geneva Arena, Geneva, Switzerland; World Group first round; clay(i) surface
Victory	6	II	Singles	Australia	Chris Guccione	7–5, 3–6, 6–4, 7–6^{(8–6)}
Defeat	7	III	Doubles (with Yves Allegro)	Australia	Wayne Arthurs / Paul Hanley	6–7^{(6–8)}, 4–6, 6–4, 6–7^{(5–7)}
Victory	8	IV	Singles	Australia	Peter Luczak	6–4, 6–2, 6–7^{(8–10)}, 6–2
▲4–1; 22–24 September 2006; Palexpo, Geneva, Switzerland; World Group play-offs; hard(i) surface
Defeat	9	II	Singles	Serbia and Montenegro	Novak Djokovic	4–6, 6–3, 6–2, 6–7^{(3–7)}, 4–6
▼2–3; 21–23 September 2007; Sazka Arena, Prague, Czech Republic; World Group play-offs; carpet(i) surface
Defeat	10	II	Singles	Czech Republic	Tomáš Berdych	6–7^{(5–7)}, 4–6, 5–7
Defeat	11	V	Singles (decider)	Czech Republic	Radek Štěpánek	7–6^{(7–4)}, 6–3, 7–6^{(7–5)}
▲4–1; 8–10 February 2008; Bodensee-Arena, Kreuzlingen, Switzerland; Group I Europe/Africa first round; hard(i) surface
Victory	12	II	Singles	Poland	Błażej Koniusz	6–3, 7–6^{(7–4)}, 6–3
▲4–1; 11–13 April 2008; Football Manege, Minsk, Belarus; Group I Europe/Africa second round; carpet(i) surface
Victory	13	II	Singles	Belarus	Uladzimir Ignatik	4–6, 6–1, 7–6^{(7–2)}, 6–2
Defeat	14	III	Doubles (with Yves Allegro)	Belarus	Max Mirnyi / Vladimir Voltchkov	6–3, 3–6, 1–6, 2–6
Victory	15	IV	Singles	Belarus	Vladimir Voltchkov	7–6^{(8–6)}, 4–6, 0–6, 7–5, 6–4
▲4–1; 19–21 September 2008; Centre Intercommunal de Glace Malley, Lausanne, Switzerland; World Group play-offs; hard(i) surface
Victory	16	I	Singles	Belgium	Steve Darcis	6–7^{(4–7)}, 6–1, 6–3, 2–6, 6–4
Victory	17	III	Doubles (with Roger Federer)	Belgium	Xavier Malisse / Olivier Rochus	4–6, 7–6^{(8–6)}, 6–3, 6–3
▼1–4; 6–8 March 2009; Birmingham–Jefferson Convention Complex Arena, Birmingham, United States; World Group first round; hard(i) surface
Victory	18	I	Singles	United States	James Blake	3–6, 6–4, 6–3, 7–6^{(7–3)}
Defeat	19	III	Doubles (with Yves Allegro)	United States	Bob Bryan / Mike Bryan	3–6, 4–6, 6–3, 6–7^{(2–7)}
Defeat	20	IV	Singles	United States	Andy Roddick	4–6, 4–6, 2–6
▲3–2; 18–20 September 2009; Centro Sportivo "Valletta Cambiaso", Genoa, Italy; World Group play-offs; clay surface
Victory	21	I	Singles	Italy	Andreas Seppi	6–4, 6–1, 6–2
Defeat	22	III	Doubles (with Marco Chiudinelli)	Italy	Simone Bolelli / Potito Starace	2–6, 4–6, 6–7^{(3–7)}
▼1–4; 5–7 March 2010; Plaza de Toros de La Ribera, Logroño, Spain; World Group first round; clay(i) surface
Victory	23	I	Singles	Spain	Nicolás Almagro	3–6, 6–4, 3–6, 7–5, 6–3
Defeat	24	III	Doubles (with Yves Allegro)	Spain	Marcel Granollers / Tommy Robredo	6–7^{(8–10)}, 2–6, 6–4, 4–6
Defeat	25	IV	Singles	Spain	David Ferrer	2–6, 4–6, 0–6
▼0–5; 17–19 September 2010; National Tennis Centre, Astana, Kazakhstan; World Group play-offs; hard(i) surface
Defeat	26	II	Singles	Kazakhstan	Mikhail Kukushkin	6–3, 1–6, 4–6, 6–1, 3–6
Defeat	27	III	Doubles (with Yves Allegro)	Kazakhstan	Andrey Golubev / Yuri Schukin	4–6, 3–6, 3–6
▲5–0; 8–10 July 2011; PostFinance-Arena, Bern, Switzerland; Group I Europe/Africa second round; hard(i) surface
Victory	28	I	Singles	Portugal	Frederico Gil	7–5, 6–3, 6–4
Victory	29	III	Doubles (with Roger Federer)	Portugal	Frederico Gil / Leonardo Tavares	6–3, 6–4, 6–4
Victory	30	V	Singles (dead rubber)	Portugal	Leonardo Tavares	7–6^{(7–1)}, 6–0
▲3–2; 16–18 September 2011; Royal Sydney Golf Club, Sydney, Australia; World Group play-offs; grass surface
Defeat	31	I	Singles	Australia	Bernard Tomic	6–4, 4–6, 3–6, 3–6
Defeat	32	III	Doubles (with Roger Federer)	Australia	Chris Guccione / Lleyton Hewitt	6–2, 4–6, 2–6, 6–7^{(5–7)}
Victory	33	V	Singles (decider)	Australia	Lleyton Hewitt	4–6, 6–4, 6–7^{(7–9)}, 6–4, 6–3
▼0–5; 10–12 February 2012; Forum Fribourg, Fribourg, Switzerland; World Group first round; clay(i) surface
Defeat	34	I	Singles	United States	Mardy Fish	2–6, 6–4, 6–4, 1–6, 7–9
Defeat	35	III	Doubles (with Roger Federer)	United States	Mike Bryan / Mardy Fish	6–4, 3–6, 3–6, 3–6
▲3–2; 14–16 September 2012; Westergasfabriek, Amsterdam, Netherlands; World Group play-offs; clay surface
Victory	36	II	Singles	Netherlands	Robin Haase	6–3, 3–6, 6–3, 7–6^{(7–4)}
Defeat	37	III	Doubles (with Roger Federer)	Netherlands	Robin Haase / Jean-Julien Rojer	4–6, 2–6, 7–5, 3–6
▼2–3; 1–3 February 2013; Palexpo, Geneva, Switzerland; World Group first round; hard(i) surface
Victory	38	I	Singles	Czech Republic	Lukáš Rosol	6–4, 6–3, 6–4
Defeat	39	III	Doubles (with Marco Chiudinelli)	Czech Republic	Tomáš Berdych / Lukáš Rosol	4–6, 7–5, 4–6, 7–6^{(7–3)}, 22–24
Defeat	40	IV	Singles	Czech Republic	Tomáš Berdych	3–6, 4–6, 6–3, 6–7^{(5–7)}
▲4–1; 13–15 September 2013; Patinoire du Littoral, Neuchâtel, Switzerland; World Group play-offs; hard(i) surface
Victory	41	I	Singles	Ecuador	Emilio Gómez	6–4, 6–3, 6–3
Victory	42	III	Doubles (with Michael Lammer)	Ecuador	Emilio Gómez / Roberto Quiroz	6–3, 6–4, 3–6, 6–7^{(7–9)}, 6–4
▲3–2; 31 January – 2 February 2014; SPENS, Novi Sad, Serbia; World Group first round; hard(i) surface
Victory	43	II	Singles	Serbia	Dušan Lajović	6–4, 4–6, 6–1, 7–6^{(9–7)}
▲3–2; 4–6 April 2014; Palexpo, Geneva, Switzerland; World Group quarterfinal; hard(i) surface
Defeat	44	I	Singles	Kazakhstan	Andrey Golubev	6–7^{(5–7)}, 2–6, 6–3, 6–7^{(5–7)}
Defeat	45	III	Doubles (with Roger Federer)	Kazakhstan	Andrey Golubev / Aleksandr Nedovesov	4–6, 6–7^{(5–7)}, 6–4, 6–7^{(6–8)}
Victory	46	IV	Singles	Kazakhstan	Mikhail Kukushkin	6–7^{(4–7)}, 6–4, 6–4, 6–4
▲3–2; 12–14 September 2014; Palexpo, Geneva, Switzerland; World Group semifinal; hard(i) surface
Victory	47	II	Singles	Italy	Fabio Fognini	6–2, 6–3, 6–2
Defeat	48	III	Doubles (with Marco Chiudinelli)	Italy	Simone Bolelli / Fabio Fognini	5–7, 6–3, 7–5, 3–6, 2–6
▲3–1; 21–23 November 2014; Stade Pierre-Mauroy, Lille, France; World Group final; clay(i) surface
Victory	49	I	Singles	France	Jo-Wilfried Tsonga	6–1, 3–6, 6–3, 6–2
Victory	50	III	Doubles (with Roger Federer)	France	Julien Benneteau / Richard Gasquet	6–3, 7–5, 6–4
▲4–1; 18–20 September 2015; Palexpo, Geneva, Switzerland; World Group play-offs; hard(i) surface
Victory	51	I	Singles	Netherlands	Thiemo de Bakker	2–6, 6–3, 4–6, 6–3, 7–5

== See also ==
- List of Grand Slam men's singles champions
- Chronological list of men's Grand Slam tennis champions
- List of male singles tennis players
- List of male doubles tennis players
- Top ten ranked male tennis players
