= 2023 Croatia Open Umag – Doubles =

Doubles
- 2023 Croatia Open Umag
- 2022 Champions: (Italy) Simone Bolelli (Italy) Fabio Fognini

Final
- Champions: (Slovenia) Blaž Rola (Croatia) Nino Serdarušić
- Runners-up: (Italy) Simone Bolelli (Italy) Andrea Vavassori
- Score: 4–6, 7–6^{(7–2)}, [15–13]

Details
- Draw: 16
- Seeds: 4

Events
Singles	Doubles
- Croatia Open

Blaž Rola and Nino Serdarušić defeated the defending champion Simone Bolelli and his partner Andrea Vavassori in the final, 4–6, 7–6^{(7–2)}, [15–13] to win the doubles tennis title at the 2023 Croatia Open Umag.

Bolelli and Fabio Fognini were the reigning champions, but Fognini chose not to defend the title.

== Seeds ==
1. (Italy) Simone Bolelli / (Italy) Andrea Vavassori (final)
2. (France) Sadio Doumbia / (France) Fabien Reboul (semifinals)
3. (Portugal) Francisco Cabral / (Brazil) Rafael Matos (quarterfinals)
4. (Uruguay) Ariel Behar / (Czech Republic) Adam Pavlásek (first round)

== Draw ==
Key

- Q = Qualifier
- WC = Wild card
- LL = Lucky loser
- Alt = Alternate
- ITF = ITF entry
- PR = Protected ranking
- SR = Special ranking
- SE = Special exempt
- JE = Junior exempt
- JR = Junior Accelerator Programme entrant
- CO = College Accelerator Programme entrant
- NG = Next Gen Accelerator Program entrant
- w/o = Walkover
- r = Retired
- d = Defaulted

=== Draw ===
First round
1	(Italy) S Bolelli (Italy) A Vavassori	6	6
(Kazakhstan) A Golubev (Ukraine) D Molchanov	4	1
(Monaco) R Arneodo (Austria) S Weissborn	4	6^{4}
(Czech Republic) R Jebavý (Czech Republic) J Lehečka	6	7^{7}
3	(Portugal) F Cabral (Brazil) R Matos	6	7^{7}
(France) A Olivetti (Spain) D Vega Hernández	2	6^{5}
(Netherlands) S Arends (Netherlands) D Pel	3	6	[10]
(Brazil) M Demoliner (Austria) P Oswald	6	3	[5]
WC	(Slovenia) B Rola (Croatia) N Serdarušić	4	6	[10]
(Italy) M Bortolotti (Netherlands) S Verbeek	6	3	[8]
(Ecuador) G Escobar (Kazakhstan) A Nedovyesov	6	4	[10]
4	(Uruguay) A Behar (Czech Republic) A Pavlásek	3	6	[3]
WC	(Croatia) Z Babić (Croatia) L Mikrut	2	1
(Colombia) N Barrientos (Argentina) G Durán	6	6
(India) S Balaji (India) J Nedunchezhiyan	0	3
2	(France) S Doumbia (France) F Reboul	6	6

Quarterfinals
1	(Italy) S Bolelli (Italy) A Vavassori	6	3	[10]
(Czech Republic) R Jebavý (Czech Republic) J Lehečka	4	6	[2]
3	(Portugal) F Cabral (Brazil) R Matos	4	6	[5]
(Netherlands) S Arends (Netherlands) D Pel	6	4	[10]
WC	(Slovenia) B Rola (Croatia) N Serdarušić	6	3	[10]
(Ecuador) G Escobar (Kazakhstan) A Nedovyesov	2	6	[8]
(Colombia) N Barrientos (Argentina) G Durán	5	7^{7}	[7]
2	(France) S Doumbia (France) F Reboul	7	6^{2}	[10]

Semifinals
1	(Italy) S Bolelli (Italy) A Vavassori	6	7^{7}
(Netherlands) S Arends (Netherlands) D Pel	4	6^{5}
WC	(Slovenia) B Rola (Croatia) N Serdarušić	7^{7}	6
2	(France) S Doumbia (France) F Reboul	6^{5}	4

Final
1	(Italy) S Bolelli (Italy) A Vavassori	6	6^{2}	[13]
WC	(Slovenia) B Rola (Croatia) N Serdarušić	4	7^{7}	[15]
