= 2010 BSI Challenger Lugano – Doubles =

Doubles
- 2010 BSI Challenger Lugano

Final
- Champions: (Portugal) Frederico Gil (Belgium) Christophe Rochus
- Runners-up: (Mexico) Santiago González (United States) Travis Rettenmaier
- Score: 7–5, 7–6(3)

Events
Singles	Doubles
← 2009 ·	BSI Challenger Lugano

Johan Brunström and Jean-Julien Rojer were the defending champions, but they chose to compete at Halle instead.
Frederico Gil and Christophe Rochus won in the final 7–5, 7–6(3) against Santiago González and Travis Rettenmaier.

== Seeds ==
1. (Mexico) Santiago González / (United States) Travis Rettenmaier (final)
2. (Italy) Daniele Bracciali / (Spain) David Marrero (first round)
3. (United States) James Cerretani / (Canada) Adil Shamasdin (first round)
4. (Thailand) Sanchai Ratiwatana / (Thailand) Sonchat Ratiwatana (first round)

== Draw ==
=== Key ===
- Q = Qualifier
- WC = Wild card
- LL = Lucky loser
- Alt = Alternate
- SE = Special exempt
- PR = Protected ranking
- ITF = ITF entry
- JE = Junior exempt
- w/o = Walkover
- r = Retired
- d = Defaulted
- SR = Special ranking

=== Draw ===
First round
1	(Mexico) S González (United States) T Rettenmaier	6	6
(United States) B Battistone (Sweden) A Siljeström	4	2
(Portugal) R Machado (Italy) A Motti	6	7
WC	(Italy) L Margaroli (Italy) R Sinicropi	3	5
3	(United States) J Cerretani (Canada) A Shamasdin	3	2
(Brazil) T Alves (Brazil) M Torres	6	6
(South Africa) J Coetzee (Philippines) TC Huey	7	6
(Germany) M Emmrich (Germany) F Moser	6^{2}	4
(Spain) P Andújar (Argentina) M González	6	4	[10]
WC	(Italy) A Biasella (Italy) P Starace	0	6	[12]
(Portugal) F Gil (Belgium) C Rochus	6	6
4	(Thailand) Sa Ratiwatana (Thailand) So Ratiwatana	3	3
(Russia) T Gabashvili (Netherlands) R Wassen	6	6
WC	(Switzerland) G Hayer (Switzerland) F Valsangiacomo	1	2
(Spain) A Martín (Spain) G Trujillo-Soler	6	7
2	(Italy) D Bracciali (Spain) D Marrero	4	5

Quarterfinals
1	(Mexico) S González (United States) T Rettenmaier	6	6
(Portugal) R Machado (Italy) A Motti	4	2
(Brazil) T Alves (Brazil) M Torres	4	4
(South Africa) J Coetzee (Philippines) TC Huey	6	6
(Italy) A Biasella (Italy) P Starace	2	7	[6]
(Portugal) F Gil (Belgium) C Rochus	6	6^{2}	[10]
(Russia) T Gabashvili (Netherlands) R Wassen	6	4	[11]
(Spain) A Martín (Spain) G Trujillo-Soler	3	6	[9]

Semifinals
1	(Mexico) S González (United States) T Rettenmaier	6	6
(South Africa) J Coetzee (Philippines) TC Huey	4	2
(Portugal) F Gil (Belgium) C Rochus	7	6
(Russia) T Gabashvili (Netherlands) R Wassen	6^{3}	4

Finals
1	(Mexico) S González (United States) T Rettenmaier	5	6^{3}
(Portugal) F Gil (Belgium) C Rochus	7	7
