= 2009 BSI Challenger Lugano – Singles =

Singles
- 2009 BSI Challenger Lugano

Final
- Champion: (Switzerland) Stanislas Wawrinka
- Runner-up: (Italy) Potito Starace
- Score: 7–5, 6–3

Events
Singles	Doubles
← 2008 ·	BSI Challenger Lugano	· 2010 →

Luis Horna was the defending champion, but he chose to not start this year.
Stanislas Wawrinka won in the final 7–5, 6–3, against Potito Starace.

== Seeds ==
1. (Switzerland) Stanislas Wawrinka (champion)
2. (Romania) Victor Crivoi (first round)
3. (Argentina) Sergio Roitman (first round)
4. (Italy) Potito Starace (final)
5. (Germany) Simon Greul (quarterfinals)
6. (Brazil) Thiago Alves (first round)
7. (Argentina) Agustín Calleri (first round)
8. (Brazil) Thomaz Bellucci (first round)

== Draw ==
=== Key ===
- Q = Qualifier
- WC = Wild card
- LL = Lucky loser
- Alt = Alternate
- SE = Special exempt
- PR = Protected ranking
- ITF = ITF entry
- JE = Junior exempt
- w/o = Walkover
- r = Retired
- d = Defaulted
- SR = Special ranking

=== Finals ===
Semifinals
1/WC	(Switzerland) Stanislas Wawrinka	4	6	6
SE	(Australia) Peter Luczak	6	3	4
4	(Italy) Potito Starace	6	6
Q	(Italy) Andrea Arnaboldi	4	2

Final
1/WC	(Switzerland) Stanislas Wawrinka	7	6
4	(Italy) Potito Starace	5	3

=== Top half ===
First round
1/WC	(Switzerland) S Wawrinka	6	6
(France) A Sidorenko	4	4
(France) O Patience	4	4
Q	(Italy) A Brizzi	6	6
(United States) A Bogomolov Jr.	3	2
(Argentina) S Decoud	6	6
(France) M Montcourt	6	6
7	(Argentina) A Calleri	2	4
3	(Argentina) S Roitman	5	4
(Italy) F Volandri	7	6
(Czech Republic) L Rosol	6^{6}	6	6
WC	(Switzerland) M Lammer	7	3	4
ALT	(Brazil) R Hocevar	3	6	7
(Algeria) L Ouahab	6	4	6^{7}
SE	(Australia) P Luczak	6	7
8	(Brazil) T Bellucci	4	6^{2}

Second round
1/WC	(Switzerland) S Wawrinka	6	7
Q	(Italy) A Brizzi	4	6^{3}
(Argentina) S Decoud	6^{2}	4
(France) M Montcourt	7	6
(Italy) F Volandri	4	4
(Czech Republic) L Rosol	6	6
ALT	(Brazil) R Hocevar	3	4
SE	(Australia) P Luczak	6	6

Quarterfinals
1/WC	(Switzerland) S Wawrinka	6	7
(France) M Montcourt	4	6^{5}
(Czech Republic) L Rosol	2	5
SE	(Australia) P Luczak	6	7

Semifinals
1/WC	(Switzerland) S Wawrinka	4	6	6
SE	(Australia) P Luczak	6	3	4

=== Bottom half ===
First round
5	(Germany) S Greul	6	7
(Chile) N Massú	2	5
(Spain) P Riba	6	7
(France) L Recouderc	2	6^{1}
(Uruguay) P Cuevas	6	7
(Italy) T Tenconi	2	5
(Portugal) R Machado	4	6^{7}
4	(Italy) P Starace	6	7
6	(Brazil) T Alves	4	0	r
WC	(Switzerland) S Bohli	6	4
Q	(Argentina) C Villagrán	6	4	7
Q	(Italy) A di Mauro	3	6	5
(France) J Ouanna	7	6
WC	(Australia) B Tomic	5	4
Q	(Italy) A Arnaboldi	1	6	7
2	(Romania) V Crivoi	6	0	5

Second round
5	(Germany) S Greul	6	7
(Spain) P Riba	4	6^{5}
(Uruguay) P Cuevas	2	4
4	(Italy) P Starace	6	6
WC	(Switzerland) S Bohli	6^{4}	4
Q	(Argentina) C Villagrán	7	6
(France) J Ouanna	4	4
Q	(Italy) A Arnaboldi	6	6

Quarterfinals
5	(Germany) S Greul	1	6	4
4	(Italy) P Starace	6	4	6
Q	(Argentina) C Villagrán	3	0	r
Q	(Italy) A Arnaboldi	6	2

Semifinals
4	(Italy) P Starace	6	6
Q	(Italy) A Arnaboldi	4	2
