= 2009 BSI Challenger Lugano – Doubles =

Doubles
- 2009 BSI Challenger Lugano

Final
- Champions: (Sweden) Johan Brunström (Netherlands Antilles) Jean-Julien Rojer
- Runners-up: (Uruguay) Pablo Cuevas (Argentina) Sergio Roitman
- Score: walkover

Events
Singles	Doubles
← 2008 ·	BSI Challenger Lugano	· 2010 →

Rameez Junaid and Philipp Marx were the defenders of title, but they lost to Johan Brunström and Jean-Julien Rojer in the semifinal.
Pablo Cuevas and Sergio Roitman withdrew in the final, so Brunström and Rojer became the new champions.

== Seeds ==
1. (Uruguay) Pablo Cuevas / (Argentina) Sergio Roitman (final, withdrew)
2. (Sweden) Johan Brunström / (Netherlands Antilles) Jean-Julien Rojer (champions)
3. (Australia) Rameez Junaid / (Germany) Philipp Marx (semifinals)
4. (Switzerland) Jean-Claude Scherrer / (United States) Jim Thomas (first round)

== Draw ==
=== Key ===
- Q = Qualifier
- WC = Wild card
- LL = Lucky loser
- Alt = Alternate
- SE = Special exempt
- PR = Protected ranking
- ITF = ITF entry
- JE = Junior exempt
- w/o = Walkover
- r = Retired
- d = Defaulted
- SR = Special ranking

=== Draw ===
First round
1	(Uruguay) P Cuevas (Argentina) S Roitman	6	6
(France) J Ouanna (France) O Patience	3	1
WC	(Italy) A Biasella (Italy) P Starace	6	6
(France) M Montcourt (France) L Recouderc	1	3
4	(Switzerland) J-C Scherrer (United States) J Thomas	4	0
(Germany) F Moser (Czech Republic) L Rosol	6	6
(Brazil) F Ferreiro (Mexico) S González	2	4
WC	(Italy) M Dell'Acqua (Italy) U Vico	6	6
(Argentina) A Calleri (Chile) N Massú	6	6
(Algeria) L Ouahab (Spain) P Riba	3	3
(Brazil) T Alves (Brazil) R Hocevar	6^{5}	3
3	(Australia) R Junaid (Germany) P Marx	7	6
WC	(Switzerland) Y Allegro (Italy) D Bracciali	5	7	[10]
(Germany) S Greul (Italy) A Motti	7	6^{9}	[1]
(France) O Charroin (France) A Sidorenko	3	3
2	(Sweden) J Brunström (Netherlands Antilles) J-J Rojer	6	6

Quarterfinals
1	(Uruguay) P Cuevas (Argentina) S Roitman	6	7
WC	(Italy) A Biasella (Italy) P Starace	1	6^{2}
(Germany) F Moser (Czech Republic) L Rosol	4	6^{2}
WC	(Italy) M Dell'Acqua (Italy) U Vico	6	7
(Argentina) A Calleri (Chile) N Massú	w/o
3	(Australia) R Junaid (Germany) P Marx
WC	(Switzerland) Y Allegro (Italy) D Bracciali	6	1	[9]
2	(Sweden) J Brunström (Netherlands Antilles) J-J Rojer	3	6	[11]

Semifinals
1	(Uruguay) P Cuevas (Argentina) S Roitman	6	6
WC	(Italy) M Dell'Acqua (Italy) U Vico	3	2
3	(Australia) R Junaid (Germany) P Marx	3	6	[6]
2	(Sweden) J Brunström (Netherlands Antilles) J-J Rojer	6	3	[10]

Finals
1	(Uruguay) P Cuevas (Argentina) S Roitman	w/o
2	(Sweden) J Brunström (Netherlands Antilles) J-J Rojer
