= 2009 BSI Challenger Lugano =

- Date: June 8 – June 14
- Edition: 11th
- Location: Lugano, Switzerland

Champions

Singles
- (Switzerland) Stanislas Wawrinka

Doubles
- (Sweden) Johan Brunström / (Netherlands Antilles) Jean-Julien Rojer
← 2008 ·	BSI Challenger Lugano	· 2010 →

The 2009 BSI Challenger Lugano was a professional tennis tournament played on outdoor red clay courts. It was part of the Tretorn SERIE+ of the 2009 ATP Challenger Tour. It took place in Lugano, Switzerland between 8 and 14 June 2009.

== Singles entrants ==
=== Seeds ===
Nationality	Player	Ranking*	Seeding
SUI	Stanislas Wawrinka	18	1
ROU	Victor Crivoi	99	2
ARG	Sergio Roitman	100	3
ITA	Potito Starace	104	4
GER	Simon Greul	111	5
BRA	Thiago Alves	117	6
ARG	Agustín Calleri	118	7
BRA	Thomaz Bellucci	119	8

- Rankings are as of May 25, 2010.

=== Other entrants ===
The following players received wildcards into the singles main draw:

- (Switzerland) Stéphane Bohli
- (Switzerland) Michael Lammer
- (Australia) Bernard Tomic
- (Switzerland) Stanislas Wawrinka

The following players received entry a special Exempt into the singles main draw:

- (Australia) Peter Luczak

The following players received entry from the qualifying draw:

- (Italy) Andrea Arnaboldi
- (Italy) Alberto Brizzi
- (Italy) Alessio di Mauro
- (Argentina) Cristian Villagrán

== Champions ==
=== Singles ===
(Switzerland) Stanislas Wawrinka def. (Italy) Potito Starace, 7–5, 6–3

=== Doubles ===
(Sweden) Johan Brunström / (Netherlands Antilles) Jean-Julien Rojer def. (Uruguay) Pablo Cuevas / (Argentina) Sergio Roitman, walkover
