= 2010 BSI Challenger Lugano =

- Date: June 7 – June 13
- Edition: 12th
- Location: Lugano, Switzerland

Champions

Singles
- (Switzerland) Stanislas Wawrinka

Doubles
- (Portugal) Frederico Gil / (Belgium) Christophe Rochus
← 2009 ·	BSI Challenger Lugano

The 2010 BSI Challenger Lugano was a professional tennis tournament played on outdoor red clay courts. It was part of the Tretorn SERIE+ of the 2010 ATP Challenger Tour. It took place in Lugano, Switzerland between 7 and 13 June 2010.

== ATP entrants ==
=== Seeds ===
Nationality	Player	Ranking*	Seeding
SUI	Stanislas Wawrinka	24	1
ITA	Potito Starace	60	2
POR	Frederico Gil	100	3
POR	Rui Machado	104	4
BRA	Thiago Alves	107	5
RUS	Teymuraz Gabashvili	114	6
ITA	Filippo Volandri	118	7
ESP	Alberto Martín	123	8

- Rankings are as of May 24, 2010.

=== Other entrants ===
The following players received wildcards into the singles main draw:

- (Italy) Marco Crugnola
- (Switzerland) Sandro Ehrat
- (Switzerland) Alexander Sadecky
- (Switzerland) Stanislas Wawrinka

The following players received entry a special Exempt into the singles main draw:

- (Netherlands) Robin Haase

The following players received entry from the qualifying draw:

- (Uzbekistan) Farrukh Dustov
- (France) Olivier Patience
- (France) Nicolas Renavand
- (Mexico) Bruno Rodríguez

== Champions ==
=== Singles ===
(Switzerland) Stanislas Wawrinka def. (Italy) Potito Starace 6–7(2), 6–2, 6–1

=== Doubles ===
(Portugal) Frederico Gil / (Belgium) Christophe Rochus def. (Mexico) Santiago González / (United States) Travis Rettenmaier, 7–5, 7–6(3)
