= 2023 Croatia Open Umag – Singles =

Singles
- 2023 Croatia Open Umag

Final
- Champion: (Australia) Alexei Popyrin
- Runner-up: (Switzerland) Stan Wawrinka
- Score: 6–7^{(5–7)}, 6–3, 6–4

Details
- Draw: 28 (4 Q / 3 WC )
- Seeds: 8

Events
Singles	Doubles
- Croatia Open

Alexei Popyrin defeated Stan Wawrinka in the final, 6–7^{(5–7)}, 6–3, 6–4 to win the singles tennis title at the 2023 Croatia Open Umag. It was his second ATP Tour singles title.

Jannik Sinner was the reigning champion, but chose not to defend his title.

== Seeds ==
The top four seeds received a bye into the second round.

1. (Czech Republic) Jiří Lehečka (quarterfinals)
2. (Italy) Lorenzo Sonego (semifinals)
3. (Austria) Sebastian Ofner (second round)
4. (Spain) Roberto Carballés Baena (quarterfinals)
5. (Australia) Christopher O'Connell (first round)
6. (Switzerland) Stan Wawrinka (final)
7. (Italy) Matteo Arnaldi (semifinals)
8. (Spain) Albert Ramos Viñolas (first round)

== Draw ==
Key

- Q = Qualifier
- WC = Wild card
- LL = Lucky loser
- Alt = Alternate
- ITF = ITF entry
- PR = Protected ranking
- SR = Special ranking
- SE = Special exempt
- JE = Junior exempt
- JR = Junior Accelerator Programme entrant
- CO = College Accelerator Programme entrant
- NG = Next Gen Accelerator Program entrant
- w/o = Walkover
- r = Retired
- d = Defaulted

=== Finals ===
Semifinals
7	(Italy) Matteo Arnaldi	7^{7}	5	3
(Australia) Alexei Popyrin	6^{2}	7	6
6	(Switzerland) Stan Wawrinka	6	6
2	(Italy) Lorenzo Sonego	3	4

Final
(Australia) Alexei Popyrin	6^{5}	6	6
6	(Switzerland) Stan Wawrinka	7^{7}	3	4

=== Top half ===
First round
(Austria) D Thiem	6	7
Q	(Argentina) F Bagnis	4	5
(Croatia) M Čilić	4	3
Q	(Italy) F Cobolli	6	6
Q	(Netherlands) J de Jong	3	2
7	(Italy) M Arnaldi	6	6
(Australia) A Popyrin	6	7
(France) B Bonzi	4	5
WC	(Croatia) D Ajduković	1	2
WC	(Croatia) D Prižmić	6	6
(Hungary) Z Piros	6	6
5	(Australia) C O'Connell	3	4

Second round
1	(Czech Republic) J Lehečka	6	7
(Austria) D Thiem	3	5
Q	(Italy) F Cobolli	3	6^{5}
7	(Italy) M Arnaldi	6	7^{7}
3	(Austria) S Ofner	4	1
(Australia) A Popyrin	6	6
WC	(Croatia) D Prižmić	6	6
(Hungary) Z Piros	2	3

Quarterfinals
1	(Czech Republic) J Lehečka	6	2	4
7	(Italy) M Arnaldi	3	6	6
(Australia) A Popyrin	7^{7}	7
WC	(Croatia) D Prižmić	6^{2}	5

Semifinals
7	(Italy) M Arnaldi	7^{7}	5	3
(Australia) A Popyrin	6^{2}	7	6

=== Bottom half ===
First round
6	(Switzerland) S Wawrinka	6	6
Q	(Austria) F Misolic	3	2
(Switzerland) M-A Hüsler	4	2
(Argentina) F Coria	6	6
(Japan) T Daniel	1	7	6
WC	(Spain) M Landaluce	6	5	2
8	(Spain) A Ramos Viñolas	3	6	3
(Spain) J Munar	6	3	6
(Hungary) F Marozsán	6	6
(Argentina) JM Cerúndolo	3	2
(Italy) M Cecchinato	4	7^{7}	6
A Shevchenko	6	6^{0}	3

Second round
6	(Switzerland) S Wawrinka	7	6
(Argentina) F Coria	5	1
(Japan) T Daniel	3	1
4	(Spain) R Carballés Baena	6	6
(Spain) J Munar	6	6
(Hungary) F Marozsán	4	3
(Italy) M Cecchinato	1	6^{7}
2	(Italy) L Sonego	6	7^{9}

Quarterfinals
6	(Switzerland) S Wawrinka	6	7
4	(Spain) R Carballés Baena	4	5
(Spain) J Munar	6	1	2
2	(Italy) L Sonego	3	6	6

Semifinals
6	(Switzerland) S Wawrinka	6	6
2	(Italy) L Sonego	3	4

== Qualifying ==
=== Seeds ===
1. (Chile) Alejandro Tabilo (first round)
2. (Chile) Tomás Barrios Vera (qualifying competition)
3. (Italy) Andrea Vavassori (first round)
4. (Kazakhstan) Timofey Skatov (qualifying competition)
5. (Argentina) Facundo Bagnis (qualified)
6. (Austria) Filip Misolic (qualified)
7. (Italy) Raúl Brancaccio (first round)
8. (Italy) Luca Nardi (first round)

=== Qualifiers ===
1. (Austria) Filip Misolic
2. (Netherlands) Jesper de Jong
3. (Italy) Flavio Cobolli
4. (Argentina) Facundo Bagnis

=== Qualifying draw ===
==== First qualifier ====
First round
1	(Chile) Alejandro Tabilo	4	6	6^{4}
(Bosnia and Herzegovina) Damir Džumhur	6	4	7^{7}
Alt	(Uruguay) Pablo Cuevas	5	2
6	(Austria) Filip Misolic	7	6

Qualifying competition
(Bosnia and Herzegovina) Damir Džumhur	4	3
6	(Austria) Filip Misolic	6	6

==== Second qualifier ====
First round
2	(Chile) Tomás Barrios Vera	6	6
WC	(Croatia) Nino Serdarušić	4	2
(Netherlands) Jesper de Jong	4	6	6
7	(Italy) Raúl Brancaccio	6	2	3

Qualifying competition
2	(Chile) Tomás Barrios Vera	2	4
(Netherlands) Jesper de Jong	6	6

==== Third qualifier ====
First round
3	(Italy) Andrea Vavassori	2	6	6^{6}
(Czech Republic) Zdeněk Kolář	6	4	7^{8}
(Italy) Flavio Cobolli	6	7
8	(Italy) Luca Nardi	1	5

Qualifying competition
(Czech Republic) Zdeněk Kolář	4	2
(Italy) Flavio Cobolli	6	6

==== Fourth qualifier ====
First round
4	(Kazakhstan) Timofey Skatov	6	6
WC	(Croatia) Jerko Brkić	2	2
(Italy) Francesco Maestrelli	4	1
5	(Argentina) Facundo Bagnis	6	6

Qualifying competition
4	(Kazakhstan) Timofey Skatov	7	4	2
5	(Argentina) Facundo Bagnis	5	6	6
