= Kněžmost =

- Municipality
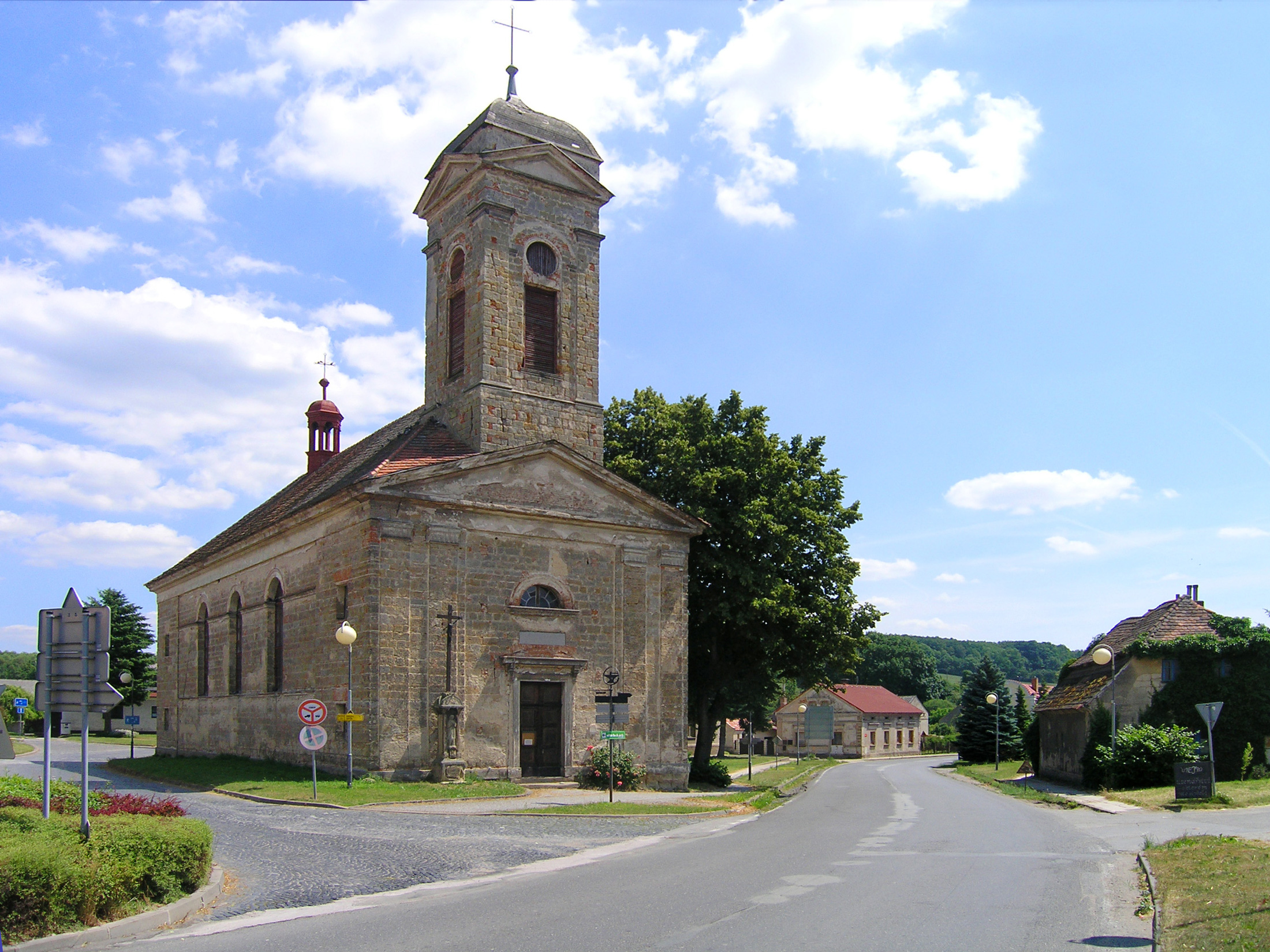
- Church of Saint Francis of Assisi

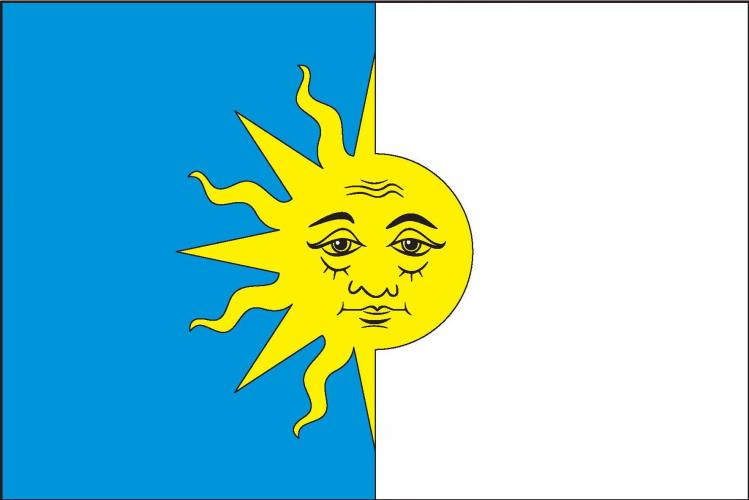
- Flag Coat of arms

- Location in the Czech Republic
- Coordinates: 50°29′21″N 15°2′18″E
- Country: Czech Republic
- Region: Central Bohemian
- District: Mladá Boleslav
- First mentioned: 1380

Area
  - Total: 40.45 km^{2} (15.62 sq mi)
- Elevation: 242 m (794 ft)

Population (2026-01-01)
  - Total: 2,346
  - Density: 58.00/km^{2} (150.2/sq mi)
- Time zone: UTC+1 (CET)
  - Summer (DST): UTC+2 (CEST)
- Postal codes: 294 02, 294 06
- Website: www.knezmost.cz

Kněžmost is a municipality and village in Mladá Boleslav District in the Central Bohemian Region of the Czech Republic. It has about 2,300 inhabitants.

== Administrative division ==
Kněžmost consists of 15 municipal parts (in brackets population according to the 2021 census):

- Kněžmost (1,278)
- Býčina (44)
- Chlumín (50)
- Čížovka (17)
- Drhleny (56)
- Koprník (101)
- Lítkovice (60)
- Malobratřice (111)
- Násedlnice (77)
- Solec (43)
- Soleček (51)
- Srbsko (41)
- Suhrovice (92)
- Úhelnice (115)
- Žantov (61)

== Etymology ==
The name is derived from knížecí most, i.e. 'princely bridge'. The settlement was founded by an old princely bridge.

== Geography ==
Kněžmost is located about 11 kilometres (7 mi) east of Mladá Boleslav and 55 km (34 mi) northeast of Prague. It lies in the Jičín Uplands. The highest point is the hill Větrák at 361 m (1,184 ft) above sea level. The Kněžmostka stream flows through the municipality and supplies several fishponds. The northern part of the territory lies in the Bohemian Paradise Protected Landscape Area.

== History ==
The first written mention of Kněžmost is from 1380, but the customs office was here already in 1316.

== Demographics ==
Historical population

Year	Pop.	±%
1869	2,925	—
1880	2,889	−1.2%
1890	2,801	−3.0%
1900	2,632	−6.0%
1910	2,601	−1.2%

Year	Pop.	±%
1921	2,656	+2.1%
1930	2,513	−5.4%
1950	1,849	−26.4%
1961	1,809	−2.2%
1970	1,711	−5.4%

Year	Pop.	±%
1980	1,547	−9.6%
1991	1,461	−5.6%
2001	1,510	+3.4%
2011	1,873	+24.0%
2021	2,197	+17.3%

Source: Censuses

== Transport ==
The railway from Bakov nad Jizerou to Dolní Bousov passes through the territory, but it is not used.

== Sights ==
The main landmark of Kněžmost is the Church of Saint Francis of Assisi. It was built in the Empire style in 1838–1843.

== Notable people ==
- Jiří Lehečka (born 2001), tennis player
