= 2010 BSI Challenger Lugano – Singles =

Singles
- 2010 BSI Challenger Lugano

Final
- Champion: (Switzerland) Stanislas Wawrinka
- Runner-up: (Italy) Potito Starace
- Score: 6–7(2), 6–2, 6–1

Events
Singles	Doubles
- BSI Challenger Lugano

Stanislas Wawrinka was the defending champion, and he won in the final 6–7(2), 6–2, 6–1 against Potito Starace.

== Seeds ==
1. (Switzerland) Stanislas Wawrinka (champion)
2. (Italy) Potito Starace (final)
3. (Portugal) Frederico Gil (first round)
4. (Portugal) Rui Machado (first round)
5. (Brazil) Thiago Alves (first round)
6. (Russia) Teymuraz Gabashvili (semifinals)
7. (Italy) Filippo Volandri (second round retired)
8. (Spain) Alberto Martín (semifinals)

== Draw ==
Key

- Q = Qualifier
- WC = Wild card
- LL = Lucky loser
- Alt = Alternate
- ITF = ITF entry
- PR = Protected ranking
- SR = Special ranking
- SE = Special exempt
- JE = Junior exempt
- JR = Junior Accelerator Programme entrant
- CO = College Accelerator Programme entrant
- NG = Next Gen Accelerator Program entrant
- w/o = Walkover
- r = Retired
- d = Defaulted

=== Finals ===
Semifinals
1/WC	(Switzerland) Stanislas Wawrinka	3	6	7
6	(Russia) Teymuraz Gabashvili	6	2	5
8	(Spain) Alberto Martín	5	2
2	(Italy) Potito Starace	7	6

Final
1/WC	(Switzerland) Stanislas Wawrinka	6^{2}	6	6
2	(Italy) Potito Starace	7	2	1

=== Top half ===
First round
1/WC	(Switzerland) S Wawrinka	6	6
WC	(Italy) M Crugnola	1	2
(Colombia) C Salamanca	1	0
Q	(France) O Patience	6	6
(Italy) A di Mauro	6	6
Q	(France) N Renavand	4	2
(Spain) P Andújar	2	6	6^{8}
7	(Italy) F Volandri	6	2	7
4	(Portugal) R Machado	1	3
(Romania) A Ungur	6	6
(Mexico) S González	2	7	6
(Belarus) U Ignatik	6	6^{8}	3
(Croatia) A Veić	7	6
(Belgium) C Rochus	6^{4}	1
(Brazil) J Souza	7	3	3
6	(Russia) T Gabashvili	5	6	6

Second round
1/WC	(Switzerland) S Wawrinka	6	6
Q	(France) O Patience	4	1
(Italy) A di Mauro	6
7	(Italy) F Volandri	2	r
(Romania) A Ungur	3	6	7
(Mexico) S González	6	3	6^{2}
(Croatia) A Veić	3	5
6	(Russia) T Gabashvili	6	7

Quarterfinals
1/WC	(Switzerland) S Wawrinka	7	6
(Italy) A di Mauro	6^{4}	4
(Romania) A Ungur	6	6^{4}	1
6	(Russia) T Gabashvili	4	7	6

Semifinals
1/WC	(Switzerland) S Wawrinka	3	6	7
6	(Russia) T Gabashvili	6	2	5

=== Bottom half ===
First round
8	(Spain) A Martín	6	6
Q	(Mexico) B Rodríguez	3	3
(United States) A Bogomolov Jr.	6	1	6
WC	(Switzerland) S Ehrat	1	6	2
(Argentina) M González	7	6
WC	(Switzerland) A Sadecky	6^{4}	3
(Austria) M Fischer	6	6
3	(Portugal) F Gil	3	2
5	(Brazil) T Alves	3	2
(France) J Ouanna	6	6
(France) V Millot	3	6	7
(United States) K Kim	6	4	6^{4}
Q	(Uzbekistan) F Dustov	7	6
(Ukraine) I Sergeyev	6^{5}	3
SE	(Netherlands) R Haase	4	4
2	(Italy) P Starace	6	6

Second round
8	(Spain) A Martín	6	7
(United States) A Bogomolov Jr.	3	5
(Argentina) M González	3	5
(Austria) M Fischer	6	7
(France) J Ouanna	3	3
(France) V Millot	6	6
Q	(Uzbekistan) F Dustov	4	2
2	(Italy) P Starace	6	6

Quarterfinals
8	(Spain) A Martín	6	7
(Austria) M Fischer	2	5
(France) V Millot	1	2
2	(Italy) P Starace	6	6

Semifinals
8	(Spain) A Martín	5	2
2	(Italy) P Starace	7	6
