= 2023 Croatia Open Umag =

- Date: 24–30 July
- Edition: 33rd
- Category: ATP Tour 250
- Draw: 28S / 16D
- Prize money: €562,815
- Surface: Clay
- Location: Umag, Croatia

Champions

Singles
- (Australia) Alexei Popyrin

Doubles
- (Slovenia) Blaž Rola / (Croatia) Nino Serdarušić
- Croatia Open

The 2023 Croatia Open Umag, also known as the Plava Laguna Croatia Open Umag (for sponsorship reasons), was a men's tennis tournament played on outdoor clay courts. It was the 33rd edition of the Croatia Open, and part of the 250 Series of the 2023 ATP Tour. It took place at the International Tennis Center in Umag, Croatia, from 24 through 30 July 2023. Unseeded Alexei Popyrin won the singles title.

== Finals ==
=== Singles ===
(Australia) Alexei Popyrin defeated (Switzerland) Stan Wawrinka, 6–7^{(5–7)}, 6–3, 6–4

- It was Popyrin's only singles title of the year and the 2nd of his career.

=== Doubles ===
(Slovenia) Blaž Rola / (Croatia) Nino Serdarušić defeated (Italy) Simone Bolelli / (Italy) Andrea Vavassori, 4–6, 7–6^{(7–2)}, [15–13]

== Points and prize money ==
=== Point distribution ===
Event	W	F	SF	QF	Round of 16	Round of 32	Q	Q2	Q1
Singles	250	150	90	45	20	0	12	6	0
Doubles	250	150	90	45	0	—N/a	—N/a	—N/a	—N/a

=== Prize money ===
Event	W	F	SF	QF	Round of 16	Round of 32	Q2	Q1
Singles	€85,605	€49,940	€29,355	€17,010	€9,880	€6,035	€3,020	€1,645
Doubles*	€29,740	€15,910	€9,330	€5,220	€3,070	—N/a	—N/a	—N/a

_{*per team}

== Singles main draw entrants ==
=== Seeds ===
Country	Player	Rank^{1}	Seed
CZE	Jiří Lehečka	33	1
ITA	Lorenzo Sonego	42	2
AUT	Sebastian Ofner	58	3
ESP	Roberto Carballés Baena	60	4
AUS	Christopher O'Connell	67	5
SUI	Stan Wawrinka	74	6
ITA	Matteo Arnaldi	75	7
ESP	Albert Ramos Viñolas	79	8

- ^{1} Rankings are as of 17 July 2023.

=== Other entrants ===
The following players received wildcards into the main draw:

- (Croatia) Duje Ajduković
- (Spain) Martín Landaluce
- (Croatia) Dino Prižmić

The following players received entry from the qualifying draw:

- (Argentina) Facundo Bagnis
- (Italy) Flavio Cobolli
- (Netherlands) Jesper de Jong
- (Austria) Filip Misolic

=== Withdrawals ===
- (Denmark) Holger Rune → replaced by (Argentina) Juan Manuel Cerúndolo

== Doubles main draw entrants ==
=== Seeds ===
Country	Player	Country	Player	Rank^{1}	Seed
ITA	Simone Bolelli	ITA	Andrea Vavassori	85	1
FRA	Sadio Doumbia	FRA	Fabien Reboul	89	2
POR	Francisco Cabral	BRA	Rafael Matos	96	3
URU	Ariel Behar	CZE	Adam Pavlásek	100	4

- ^{1} Rankings as of 17 July 2023.

=== Other entrants ===
The following pairs received wildcards into the doubles main draw:

- (Croatia) Zvonimir Babić / (Croatia) Luka Mikrut
- (Slovenia) Blaž Rola / (Croatia) Nino Serdarušić

=== Withdrawals ===
- (Finland) Patrik Niklas-Salminen / (Netherlands) Bart Stevens → replaced by (Italy) Marco Bortolotti / (Netherlands) Sem Verbeek
