= Palexpo =

Exhibition complex in Geneva, Switzerland

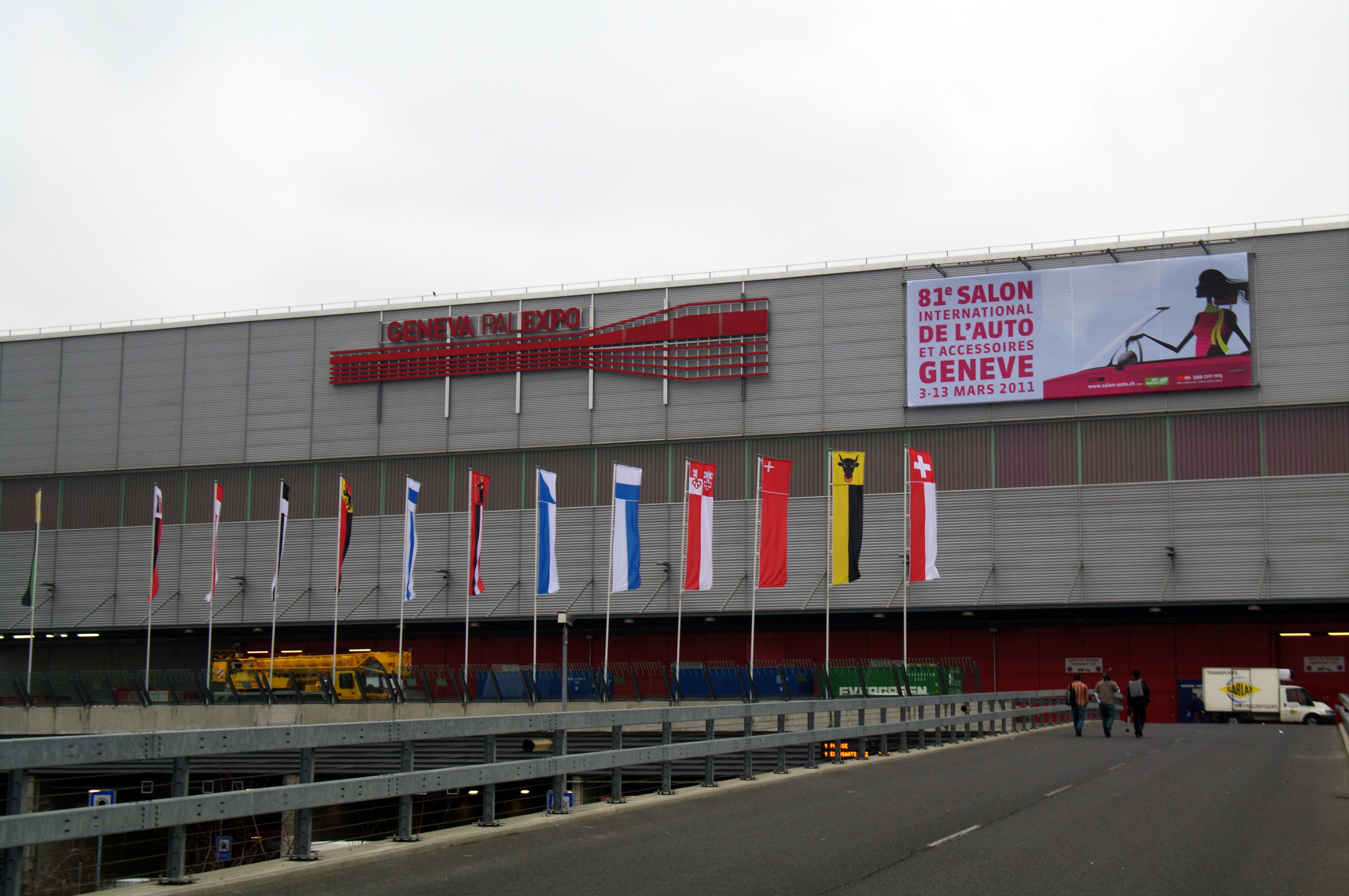
- Palexpo in March 2011
- Location: Geneva, Switzerland
- Coordinates: 46°23′49″N 61°18′2″E
- Owner: Government of the Canton of Geneva
- Operator: Palexpo SA
- Capacity: 5,000–11,000 (congress centre); 9,500 (Geneva Arena)
- Parking: 2,800 spaces

Construction
- Built: 1978–1981
- Opened: December 18, 1981; 44 years ago
- Renovated: 2009
- Expanded: 1987, 1995, 2003

Website
- www.palexpo.ch

Palexpo is an exhibition complex in Geneva on the adjacent territory of the municipality of Le Grand-Saconnex, Switzerland. The buildings are owned by the government of the Canton of Geneva, while the company is a semi-private foundation. The complex is located close to Geneva Airport. There are seven halls and 106,000 square metres of exhibition space.

== History ==
Palexpo is the successor to the old Palais des Expositions in the downtown Plainpalais district which was built in 1926 for the Geneva Motor Show. After the Second World War, other fairs were also organized there, such as the Salon des arts ménagers and, from 1971, Telecom.

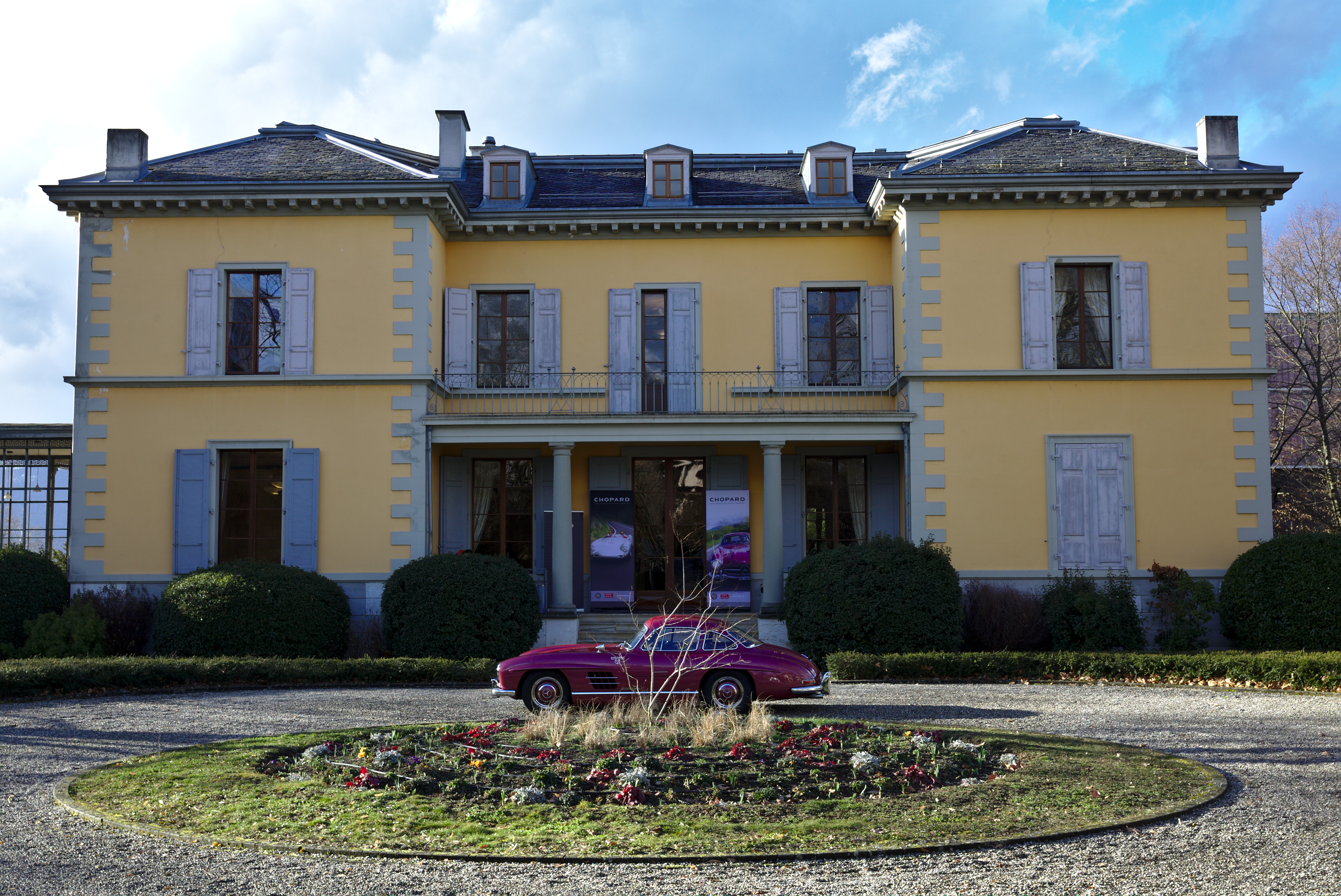
Villa Sarasin in 2019

The construction of the Palexpo began in 1978, and the four first halls with 58,000 m^{2} were inaugurated on 18 December 1981. The Palexpo was then expanded three times: in 1987 with Hall 5, in 1995 with a multi-purpose indoor arena connected to the 7th hall of the complex, and in 2003 with Hall 6 built above the A1 motorway. Under Halls 1 and 2 there is a congress center with a hall with 2,200 seats and seven smaller halls. Villa Sarasin, a 19th century mansion located right next to Hall 1, offers exclusive reception rooms and seminar rooms.

Until June 2008, almost all of the buildings were owned by the Fondation du Palais des Expositions, the public foundation that already managed the old Palais des Expositions in Plainpalais. The exception was the most recently built Hall 6, which was owned by the public law foundation Fondation pour la halle 6. Since 1957, the old Palais des Expositions and then the Palexpo were operated by the Orgexpo Foundation (Organization d'expositions). The two foundations were merged in June 2008 to form the public limited company Palexpo SA, which is majority owned by the Canton of Geneva. Since 1 January 2009, Palexpo SA has also taken over the operation of Palexpo from the Orgexpo Foundation.

In early 2009, the Palexpo underwent a renovation project to enhance and improve the convention center's architecture, furnishings, and technology. During this renovation, the Palexpo Wi-Fi network was upgraded using Xirrus wi-fi arrays to provide wireless internet for all employees and guests.

== Events ==
Palexpo hosts a variety of convention and sporting events, including the 2014 Davis Cup semifinals between Switzerland and Italy. It is scheduled to host the final weekend of the 2028 European Men's Handball Championship in which Switzerland will act as co-host alongside Portugal and Spain.

Until 2024, the Geneva International Motor Show was held annually at Palexpo. In 2001, the European Automotive Hall of Fame opened and inducted its first class of 13 members. Permanent plaques of honor will be emplaced at Palexpo. This is a European analog to the Automotive Hall of Fame which is now located in Dearborn, Michigan, and which has been in operation since 1936.

In 2019, it hosted the third edition of the Laver Cup.

Depeche Mode performed at the convention centre on November 10, 2009, during their Tour of the Universe.

In 2022, the FIRST Global Challenge was held in Geneva, Switzerland with the main venue and arena being Palexpo. It saw people from more than 190 countries in attendance and featured guests such as Dean Kamen, founder of the FIRST Robotics Competition, as well as musician Will.i.am.

In May 2024, the venue expressed interest in hosting the Eurovision Song Contest 2025, following Swiss representative Nemo's victory in 2024. It made the shortlist but was ultimately not chosen to host the contest.

== See also ==
- SEG Geneva Arena (Hall 7)
