= Jiří Lehečka =

Czech tennis player (born 2001)

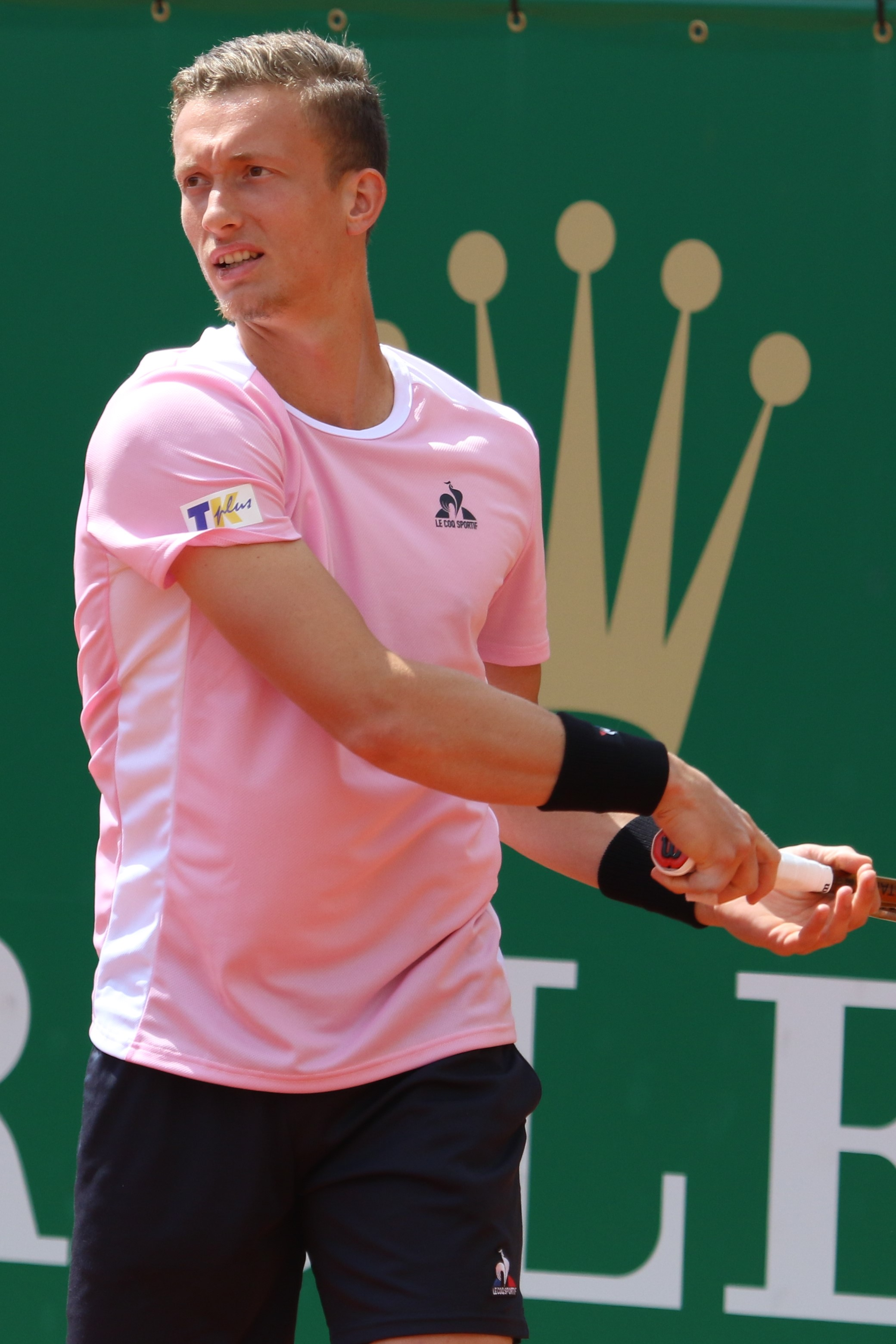
- Lehečka at the 2023 Monte-Carlo Masters
- ITF name: Jiri Lehecka
- Country (sports): Czech Republic
- Residence: Kněžmost, Czech Republic
- Born: 8 November 2001 (age 25) Mladá Boleslav, Czech Republic
- Height: 1.85 m (6 ft 1 in)
- Turned pro: 2020
- Plays: Right-handed (two-handed backhand)
- Coach: Frédéric Fontang
- Prize money: US $11,012,255

Singles
- Career record: 158–111
- Career titles: 2
- Highest ranking: No. 12 (25 May 2026)
- Current ranking: No. 14 (16 November 2026)

Grand Slam singles results
- Australian Open: QF (2023)
- French Open: 3R (2025)
- Wimbledon: 4R (2023, 2026)
- US Open: QF (2025)

Doubles
- Career record: 19–24
- Career titles: 0
- Highest ranking: No. 133 (27 October 2025)
- Current ranking: No. 361 (16 November 2026)

Grand Slam doubles results
- Australian Open: 3R (2023)
- US Open: 1R (2022)

Team competitions
- Davis Cup: 14–12
- Last updated on: 16 November 2026.

Jiří Lehečka (Czech pronunciation: [ˈjɪr̝iː ˈlɛɦɛtʃka]; born 8 November 2001) is a Czech professional tennis player. He has a career-high ATP singles ranking of world No. 12 achieved on 25 May 2026 and a doubles ranking of No. 133 achieved on 27 October 2025. He is the current No. 1 Czech singles player.

Lehečka has won two ATP Tour singles titles, and finished runner-up at an ATP Masters 1000 event at the 2026 Miami Open.

== Early life ==
Jiří Lehečka was born in a hospital in Mladá Boleslav, but he resides in Kněžmost since birth.

Lehečka is the son of two athletes. His father was a swimmer, and his mother was a track and field star. He has long enjoyed skiing, cycling and swimming and remembers first touching a tennis racquet at three. His grandmother, who competed on a national level, taught his older sister the game, so naturally he wanted to play. When Lehečka was young, he admired Tomáš Berdych and Radek Štěpánek.

== Career ==
=== 2021: Two Challenger titles, top 150 ===
In 2021, Lehečka won two ATP Challenger singles titles, one ATP Challenger doubles title with Vít Kopřiva and two with Zdeněk Kolář.

=== 2022: First ATP Tour win & semifinal ===
Lehečka qualified for the main draw of the 2022 Australian Open, defeating Michael Mmoh, Max Purcell, and Dmitry Popko. He lost in the first round to the 26th seed Grigor Dimitrov in four sets.

At the ATP tournament in Rotterdam, he reached the second round as a qualifier, with a stunning upset over fifth seed Denis Shapovalov in straight sets in his first ATP Tour main-draw match. He went on to defeat Botic van de Zandschulp and Lorenzo Musetti to reach the semifinals on his ATP debut, where he was defeated in three sets by top seed Stefanos Tsitsipas. He became the lowest-ranked Rotterdam semifinalist since then-World No. 225 Omar Camporese in 1995. As a result, he moved 42 positions up into the top 100 in the rankings at World No. 95 on 14 February 2022.

At the 2022 Serbia Open, Lehečka qualified into the main draw but lost in the second round to second seed, World No. 8 and eventual champion Andrey Rublev. At the 2022 BMW Open he qualified into the main draw, again defeating Alejandro Tabilo in two sets in the final round of qualifying. He lost to wildcard and eventual champion Holger Rune in the first round.

He made his debut at the 2022 French Open and the 2022 Wimbledon Championships where he lost in the first round in both. At the 2022 Generali Open Kitzbühel he reached the quarterfinals defeating Thiago Monteiro and eight seed João Sousa before losing to third seed Roberto Bautista Agut in a tight three-set match.

Lehečka made his debut at the 2022 US Open, completing all Major debuts in one season, where he lost to Cristian Garín.

He qualified for the 2022 Next Generation ATP Finals and reached the semifinals defeating Matteo Arnaldi. He defeated Dominic Stricker in the semifinal but lost to Brandon Nakashima in the final in straight sets.

=== 2023: ATP final and Major quarterfinal, top 30 ===
Lehečka at the 2023 US Open

Lehečka began his season as the top-ranked Czech male player at the inaugural 2023 United Cup where he lost to Taylor Fritz but defeated Alexander Zverev in Zverev's first match coming back from injury. Lehečka also played mixed doubles with Marie Bouzková. He reached the Australian Open fourth round defeating 11th seed Cameron Norrie taking his revenge after he was beaten by Norrie at the 2023 Auckland Open the previous week. Next he defeated sixth seed Félix Auger-Aliassime, his first top-10 win, to reach a Major quarterfinal for the first time in his career. As a result, he moved more than 30 positions up into the top 40 at world No. 39 on 30 January 2023. At the same tournament he also reached the third round in doubles on his debut at the event at this Major with partner Alex Molčan.

At the Qatar Open, Lehečka recorded his first top-5 win over top seed Andrey Rublev to reach the semifinals, having previously defeated qualifier Damir Džumhur and Emil Ruusuvuori. In Dubai he lost to seventh seed Alexander Zverev. At the 2023 BNP Paribas Open, he recorded his first Masters win against Arthur Rinderknech. At Miami, he defeated Federico Coria for his second Masters win, and 18th seed Lorenzo Musetti to reach the third round of a Masters for the first time in his career. In Monte Carlo he defeated Emil Ruusuvuori and Grigor Dimitrov to move to the round of 16.

At Wimbledon, he reached the fourth round for the first time at this major with wins over Sebastian Ofner, 18th seed Francisco Cerúndolo and 16th seed Tommy Paul in a five set match.

Lehečka entered the Croatia Open as the top seed at a tour-level event for the first time, and reached the quarterfinals with a win over Dominic Thiem. He also reached the quarterfinals in doubles with partner Roman Jebavý.

He reached his first ATP Tour final at the 2023 Winston-Salem Open where he lost to Sebastián Báez. As a result, he reached the top 30 in the rankings at world No. 29 on 28 August 2023.

=== 2024: ATP title and Masters semifinal, top 25 ===
Lehečka was selected to play again in the 2024 United Cup as the No. 1 player alongside Markéta Vondroušová. Lehečka reached his second final at the 2024 Adelaide International defeating third seed Sebastian Korda. He defeated Jack Draper to win his first ATP title. As a result, he reached the top 25 in the rankings on 15 January 2024.

Seeded 32nd at the 2024 BNP Paribas Open, he reached the fourth round for the first time at a Masters 1000 defeating Brandon Nakashima and fifth seed Andrey Rublev, his second top five win and second against Rublev. He reached his first career Masters quarterfinal defeating 11th seed Stefanos Tsitsipas. He lost in the last eight to Jannik Sinner.

Ranked No. 31 at the Madrid Open, Lehečka reached his second Masters quarterfinal defeating qualifiers Hamad Medjedovic and Thiago Monteiro, Rafael Nadal in the round of 16, becoming the lowest ranked man to beat the former champion in a clay Masters. Next he defeated third seed Daniil Medvedev in the quarterfinals to reach his first career Masters 1000 semifinal. He retired in the first set of the semifinal against Félix Auger-Aliassime due to a back injury.

In October, Lehečka was a finalist at the European Open in Antwerp, Belgium. He lost to Roberto Bautista Agut in the final.

=== 2025: US Open quarterfinal, top 20, Czech No. 1 ===
At the 2025 Brisbane International, Lehečka won his second ATP Tour title after the retirement of Reilly Opelka in the final. At the 2025 Australian Open, he reached the fourth round where he lost to Novak Djokovic in three sets.

At the US Open, Lehečka reached his second major quarterfinal and first since the 2023 Australian Open, with wins over Borna Ćorić, Tomás Martín Etcheverry, Raphaël Collignon and Adrian Mannarino. He lost to Carlos Alcaraz in three sets. As a result, he entered the Top 20 at world No. 16 and became the Czech No. 1 player on 8 September 2025 after surpassing Jakub Menšík. Lehečka was a finalist for a second consecutive year at the European Open, this time held in Brussels, Belgium.

=== 2026: Miami Final, top 15, Czech No.1 ===
Seeded 21st, Lehečka defeated Moïse Kouamé, sixth seed Taylor Fritz, Ethan Quinn, Martin Landaluce and 28th seed Arthur Fils to reach the first Masters final of his career. He was not broken even once en route to the final. In the final he fell down to World No.2 Jannik Sinner in straight sets. As a result, he reached a new career highest rank of 13 and reclaimed his position as Czech No.1 .

== Personal life ==
Lehečka's tennis idol is Roger Federer. He is also a fan of actor Leonardo DiCaprio.

== Career statistics ==
Key
W	F	SF	QF	#R	RR	Q#	DNQ	A	NH

(W) winner; (F) finalist; (SF) semifinalist; (QF) quarterfinalist; (#R) rounds 4, 3, 2, 1; (RR) round-robin stage; (Q#) qualification round; (DNQ) did not qualify; (A) absent; (NH) not held; (SR) strike rate (events won / competed); (W–L) win–loss record.
To avoid confusion and double counting, these charts are updated at the conclusion of a tournament or when the player's participation has ended.

=== Grand Slam performance timelines ===
==== Singles ====
Tournament	2021	2022	2023	2024	2025	2026	SR	W–L	Win %
Australian Open	A	1R	QF	2R	4R	1R	0 / 5	8–5	62%
French Open	A	1R	2R	A	3R	1R	0 / 4	3–4	43%
Wimbledon	A	1R	4R	A	2R	4R	0 / 4	7–4	64%
US Open	Q3	1R	1R	3R	QF	3R	0 / 5	8–5	60%
Win–Loss	0–0	0–4	8–4	3–2	10–4	5–4	0 / 18	26–18	59%
