= BSI Challenger Lugano =

Defunct tennis tournament
- Founded: 1999
- Editions: 12 (2010)
- Location: Lugano, Switzerland
- Venue: Tennis Club Lido Lugano
- Category: ATP Challenger Tour, Tretorn SERIE+
- Surface: Clay (red)
- Draw: 32S/32Q/16Q

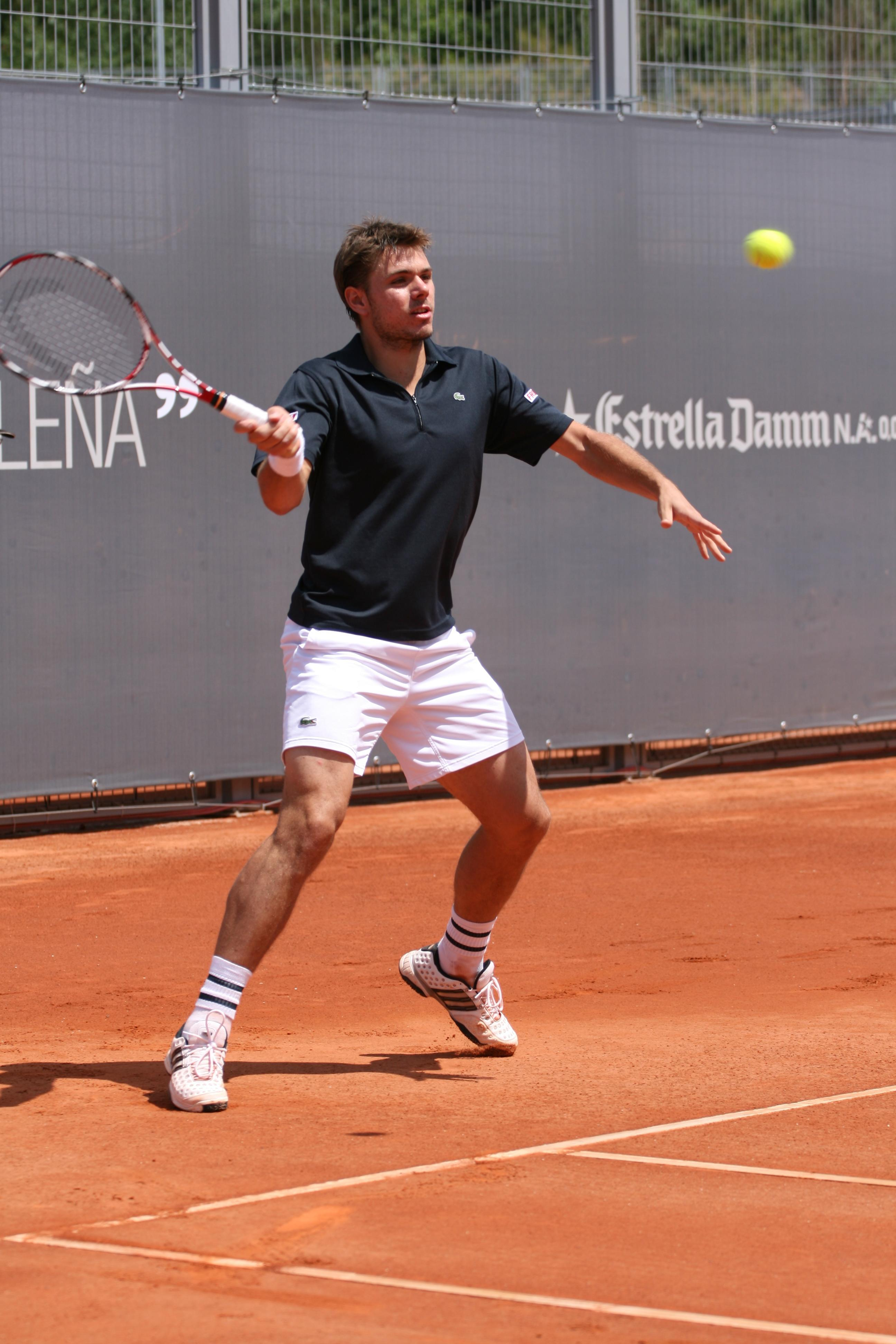
Top tenner Stanislas Wawrinka was the first Swiss to win the singles in 2009

The BSI Challenger Lugano was a professional tennis tournament played on outdoor red clay courts. It has been part of the Association of Tennis Professionals (ATP) Challenger Tour. It was held annually in June at the Tennis Club Lido Lugano in Lugano, Switzerland, from 1999 until 2010.

In 2004 it was voted by ATP and players as the best tournament of its category, receiving the World Best Challenger Award.

== Past finals ==
=== Singles ===
Year	Champion	Runner-up	Score
1999	(Czech Republic) Michal Tabara	(Haiti) Ronald Agénor	6–7(3), 6–4, 6–2
2000	(Spain) David Sánchez	(Hungary) Attila Sávolt	6–3, 6–2
2001	(Czech Republic) Jiří Vaněk	(Costa Rica) Juan Antonio Marín	6–2, 6–3
2002	(Argentina) Guillermo Coria	(Italy) Giorgio Galimberti	6–3, 6–0
2003	(Argentina) Diego Moyano	(Spain) Álex Calatrava	6–4, 1–6, 7–6(4)
2004	(Spain) Álex Calatrava	(France) Jérôme Haehnel	6–2, 6–3
2005	(Spain) Albert Montañés	(Brazil) Flávio Saretta	7–5, 6–7(4), 7–6(5)
2006	(France) Olivier Patience	(Spain) Guillermo García López	6–4, 6–1
2007	(Austria) Werner Eschauer	(Czech Republic) Jiří Vaněk	6–4, 4–6, 7–6(2)
2008	(Peru) Luis Horna	(France) Nicolas Devilder	7–6(1), 6–1
2009	(Switzerland) Stanislas Wawrinka (1)	(Italy) Potito Starace	7–5, 6–3
2010	(Switzerland) Stanislas Wawrinka (2)	(Italy) Potito Starace	6–7(2), 6–2, 6–1

=== Doubles ===
Year	Champions	Runners-up	Score
1999	(Czech Republic) Michal Tabara (Czech Republic) Radomír Vašek	(Brazil) Daniel Melo (Brazil) Antonio Prieto	6–2, 3–6, 6–3
2000	(Uzbekistan) Vadim Kutsenko (Uzbekistan) Oleg Ogorodov	(Brazil) Francisco Costa (Sweden) Tobias Hildebrand	4–6, 7–6(3), 6–0
2001	(Australia) Steven Randjelovic (Hungary) Attila Sávolt	(Netherlands) Bobbie Altelaar (South Africa) Shaun Rudman	6–2, 7–6(4)
2002	(Spain) Emilio Benfele Álvarez (1) (Italy) Giorgio Galimberti (1)	(Argentina) Cristian Kordasz (Finland) Kim Tiilikainen	4–6, 7–6(5), 6–2
2003	(Spain) Joan Balcells (Spain) Juan Albert Viloca	(Spain) Álex López Morón (Argentina) Andrés Schneiter	6–4, 6–4
2004	(Spain) Emilio Benfele Álvarez (2) (Italy) Giorgio Galimberti (2)	(Italy) Enzo Artoni (Argentina) Ignacio González King	6–4, 6–3
2005	(Italy) Enzo Artoni (Argentina) Juan Pablo Brzezicki	(Poland) Mariusz Fyrstenberg (Sweden) Robert Lindstedt	4–6, 6–2, 6–2
2006	(Italy) Giorgio Galimberti (3) (Austria) Oliver Marach	(Italy) Leonardo Azzaro (Argentina) Sergio Roitman	7–5, 6–3
2007	(Thailand) Sanchai Ratiwatana (Thailand) Sonchat Ratiwatana	(Switzerland) Jean-Claude Scherrer (Croatia) Lovro Zovko	6–4, 6–4
2008	(Australia) Rameez Junaid (Germany) Philipp Marx	(Argentina) Mariano Hood (Argentina) Eduardo Schwank	7–6(7), 4–6, [10–7]
2009	(Sweden) Johan Brunström (Netherlands Antilles) Jean-Julien Rojer	(Uruguay) Pablo Cuevas (Argentina) Sergio Roitman	walkover
2010	(Portugal) Frederico Gil (Belgium) Christophe Rochus	(Mexico) Santiago González (United States) Travis Rettenmaier	7–5, 7–6(3)
