= 2025 Swiss Open Gstaad – Singles =

Singles
- 2025 Swiss Open Gstaad

Final
- Champion: (Kazakhstan) Alexander Bublik
- Runner-up: (Argentina) Juan Manuel Cerúndolo
- Score: 6–3, 4–6, 6–3

Details
- Draw: 28
- Seeds: 8

Events
Singles	Doubles
← 2024 ·	Swiss Open Gstaad	· 2026 →

Alexander Bublik defeated Juan Manuel Cerúndolo in the final, 6–4, 4–6, 6–3 to win the singles tennis title at the 2025 Swiss Open Gstaad. It was his sixth ATP Tour title, and his first on clay. Cerúndolo was contesting his first ATP Tour final since 2021.

Matteo Berrettini was the reigning champion, but withdrew before the tournament began.

== Seeds ==
The top four seeds received a bye into the second round.

1. (Norway) Casper Ruud (quarterfinals)
2. (Kazakhstan) Alexander Bublik (champion)
3. (Spain) Pedro Martínez (withdrew)
4. (Argentina) Tomás Martín Etcheverry (second round)
5. (Serbia) Laslo Djere (first round)
6. (Belgium) David Goffin (second round)
7. (Argentina) Francisco Comesaña (quarterfinals)
8. (France) Arthur Rinderknech (first round)

== Draw ==
=== Key ===
- Q = Qualifier
- WC = Wild card
- LL = Lucky loser
- Alt = Alternate
- ITF = ITF entry
- PR = Protected ranking
- SR = Special ranking
- SE = Special exempt
- JE = Junior exempt
- JR = Junior Accelerator Programme entrant
- CO = College Accelerator Programme entrant
- NG = Next Gen Accelerator Program entrant
- w/o = Walkover
- r = Retired
- d = Defaulted

=== Finals ===
Semifinals
(Argentina) Juan Manuel Cerúndolo	6	6
Q	(Peru) Ignacio Buse	3	3
(France) Arthur Cazaux	1	5
2	(Kazakhstan) Alexander Bublik	6	7

Final
(Argentina) Juan Manuel Cerúndolo	4	6	3
2	(Kazakhstan) Alexander Bublik	6	4	6

=== Top half ===
First round
WC	(Switzerland) D Stricker	4	6	6
(France) P-H Herbert	6	4	2
(Argentina) JM Cerúndolo	6	3	6
(Germany) J-L Struff	3	6	3
NG	(Spain) M Landaluce	6^{2}	3
6/WC	(Belgium) D Goffin	7^{7}	6
(Argentina) RA Burruchaga	6	6
(Czech Republic) D Svrčina	3	1
(Poland) K Majchrzak	6	3	6
(France) T Atmane	4	6	2
Q	(Peru) I Buse	7^{7}	1	6
5	(Serbia) L Djere	6^{4}	6	4

Second round
1	(Norway) C Ruud	7	7^{8}
WC	(Switzerland) D Stricker	5	6^{6}
(Argentina) JM Cerúndolo	5	6	6
6/WC	(Belgium) D Goffin	7	4	1
LL	(Germany) P Zahraj	6	4	1
(Argentina) RA Burruchaga	4	6	6
(Poland) K Majchrzak	6	5	1
Q	(Peru) I Buse	1	7	6

Quarterfinals
1	(Norway) C Ruud	2	6	3
(Argentina) JM Cerúndolo	6	1	6
(Argentina) RA Burruchaga	3	6	1
Q	(Peru) I Buse	6	3	6

Semifinals
(Argentina) JM Cerúndolo	6	6
Q	(Peru) I Buse	3	3

=== Bottom half ===
First round
8	(France) A Rinderknech	1	5
Q	(Italy) F Passaro	6	7
WC	(Switzerland) J Kym	7	4	7
Q	(France) C Hemery	5	6	5
(France) A Cazaux	4	7	7^{7}
(Georgia (country)) N Basilashvili	6	5	6^{5}
7	(Argentina) F Comesaña	6	6
Q	(Argentina) M Trungelliti	3	4
(Spain) R Carballés Baena	1	6	7^{7}
(Spain) C Taberner	6	2	6^{5}
(Kazakhstan) A Shevchenko	6	6
(Switzerland) S Wawrinka	3	2

Second round
Q	(Italy) F Passaro	6^{3}	6^{3}
WC	(Switzerland) J Kym	7^{7}	7^{7}
(France) A Cazaux	6	4	6
4	(Argentina) TM Etcheverry	3	6	4
7	(Argentina) F Comesaña	6	6
(Spain) R Carballés Baena	1	4
(Kazakhstan) A Shevchenko	2	3
2	(Kazakhstan) A Bublik	6	6

Quarterfinals
WC	(Switzerland) J Kym	6^{3}	6	5
(France) A Cazaux	7^{7}	3	7
7	(Argentina) F Comesaña	4	3
2	(Kazakhstan) A Bublik	6	6

Semifinals
(France) A Cazaux	1	5
2	(Kazakhstan) A Bublik	6	7

== Qualifying ==
=== Seeds ===
1. (Italy) Francesco Passaro (qualified)
2. (Germany) Yannick Hanfmann (first round)
3. (Argentina) Marco Trungelliti (qualified)
4. (Peru) Ignacio Buse (qualified)
5. (Portugal) Henrique Rocha (first round)
6. (Switzerland) Marc-Andrea Hüsler (first round)
7. (Hong Kong) Coleman Wong (first round)
8. (Kazakhstan) Dmitry Popko (first round)

=== Qualifiers ===
1. (Italy) Francesco Passaro
2. (France) Calvin Hemery
3. (Argentina) Marco Trungelliti
4. (Peru) Ignacio Buse

=== Lucky loser ===
1. (Germany) Patrick Zahraj

=== Qualifying draw ===
==== First qualifier ====
First round
1	(Italy) Francesco Passaro	6	6
WC	(Switzerland) Mika Brunold	3	2
Alt	(Peru) Gonzalo Bueno	1	6	7^{7}
6	(Switzerland) Marc-Andrea Hüsler	6	3	6^{4}

Qualifying competition
1	(Italy) Francesco Passaro	6	6
Alt	(Peru) Gonzalo Bueno	3	4

==== Second qualifier ====
First round
2	(Germany) Yannick Hanfmann	5	6^{7}
(France) Calvin Hemery	7	7^{9}
PR	(Argentina) Facundo Bagnis	6^{7}	7	6
7	(Hong Kong) Coleman Wong	7^{9}	5	4

Qualifying competition
(France) Calvin Hemery	6	1	6
PR	(Argentina) Facundo Bagnis	4	6	1

==== Third qualifier ====
First round
3	(Argentina) Marco Trungelliti	7	6
(Switzerland) Alexander Ritschard	5	4
WC	(Switzerland) Henry Bernet	7^{7}	6
8	(Kazakhstan) Dmitry Popko	6^{3}	3

Qualifying competition
3	(Argentina) Marco Trungelliti	7	6^{2}	6
WC	(Switzerland) Henry Bernet	5	7^{7}	4

==== Fourth qualifier ====
First round
4	(Peru) Ignacio Buse	6	6^{6}	6
(Spain) Albert Ramos Viñolas	4	7^{8}	3
(Germany) Patrick Zahraj	7	6
5	(Portugal) Henrique Rocha	5	4

Qualifying competition
4	(Peru) Ignacio Buse	7^{7}	6
(Germany) Patrick Zahraj	6^{4}	3
