= 2022 Swiss Open Gstaad – Singles =

Tennis tournament

Singles
- 2022 Swiss Open Gstaad

Final
- Champion: (Norway) Casper Ruud
- Runner-up: (Italy) Matteo Berrettini
- Score: 4–6, 7–6^{(7–4)}, 6–2

Details
- Draw: 28
- Seeds: 8

Events
Singles	Doubles
← 2021 ·	Swiss Open Gstaad	· 2023 →

Defending champion Casper Ruud defeated Matteo Berrettini in the final, 4–6, 7–6^{(7–4)}, 6–2 to win the singles tennis title at the 2022 Swiss Open Gstaad.

The semifinal lineup comprised Ruud, Berrettini, Albert Ramos Viñolas, and Dominic Thiem. All four players were former Gstaad champions (Ruud in 2021, Berrettini in 2018, Ramos Viñolas in 2019, and Thiem in 2015), marking the first ATP Tour tournament where all four semifinalists were former champions since the 2010 Rogers Cup.

== Seeds ==
The top four seeds receive a bye into the second round.

1. (Norway) Casper Ruud (champion)
2. (Italy) Matteo Berrettini (final)
3. (Spain) Roberto Bautista Agut (second round)
4. (Spain) Albert Ramos Viñolas (semifinals)
5. (Spain) Pedro Martínez (quarterfinals)
6. (Chile) Cristian Garín (first round)
7. (France) Hugo Gaston (first round)
8. (Portugal) João Sousa (first round)

== Draw ==
=== Key ===
- Q = Qualifier
- WC = Wild card
- LL = Lucky loser
- Alt = Alternate
- SE = Special exempt
- PR = Protected ranking
- ITF = ITF entry
- JE = Junior exempt
- w/o = Walkover
- r = Retired
- d = Defaulted
- SR = Special ranking

=== Finals ===
Semifinals
1	(Norway) Casper Ruud	6	6
4	(Spain) Albert Ramos Viñolas	2	0
PR	(Austria) Dominic Thiem	1	4
2	(Italy) Matteo Berrettini	6	6

Final
1	(Norway) Casper Ruud	4	7^{7}	6
2	(Italy) Matteo Berrettini	6	6^{4}	2

=== Top half ===
First round
(Argentina) TM Etcheverry	1	3
(Czech Republic) J Lehečka	6	6
(Spain) J Munar	6	3	7
(Spain) B Zapata Miralles	3	6	5
WC	(Switzerland) A Ritschard	6	6
8	(Portugal) J Sousa	3	3
WC	(Switzerland) M-A Hüsler	7^{7}	6^{2}	4
WC	(Switzerland) D Stricker	6^{2}	7^{7}	6
Q	(Chile) N Jarry	6^{9}	7^{7}	7^{8}
(Brazil) T Monteiro	7^{11}	6^{4}	6^{6}
Q	(Germany) Y Hanfmann	6	6
6	(Chile) C Garín	3	4

Second round
1	(Norway) C Ruud	6	6
(Czech Republic) J Lehečka	3	4
(Spain) J Munar	6	6
WC	(Switzerland) A Ritschard	3	3
4	(Spain) A Ramos Viñolas	6	4	6
WC	(Switzerland) D Stricker	3	6	1
Q	(Chile) N Jarry	7^{7}	7^{7}
Q	(Germany) Y Hanfmann	6^{5}	6^{2}

Quarterfinals
1	(Norway) C Ruud	7^{7}	7^{7}
(Spain) J Munar	6^{3}	6^{4}
4	(Spain) A Ramos Viñolas	7^{7}	4	7^{10}
Q	(Chile) N Jarry	6^{4}	6	6^{8}

Semifinals
1	(Norway) C Ruud	6	6
4	(Spain) A Ramos Viñolas	2	0

=== Bottom half ===
First round
7	(France) H Gaston	6	1	6^{7}
PR	(Austria) D Thiem	1	6	7^{9}
(Argentina) F Delbonis	6	7
(Sweden) M Ymer	4	5
(Italy) L Sonego	6^{5}	2
Q	(Peru) JP Varillas	7^{7}	6
5	(Spain) P Martínez	6	6
(Spain) C Taberner	4	3
(France) B Paire	2	0^{r}
Q	(Sweden) E Ymer	6	2
(France) R Gasquet	7	6
(Spain) R Carballés Baena	5	4

Second round
PR	(Austria) D Thiem	7^{8}	6
(Argentina) F Delbonis	6^{6}	3
Q	(Peru) JP Varillas	7^{7}	7
3	(Spain) R Bautista Agut	6^{3}	5
5	(Spain) P Martínez	7	4	6
Q	(Sweden) E Ymer	5	6	2
(France) R Gasquet	4	4
2	(Italy) M Berrettini	6	6

Quarterfinals
PR	(Austria) D Thiem	6	6
Q	(Peru) JP Varillas	4	3
5	(Spain) P Martínez	6	6^{5}	1
2	(Italy) M Berrettini	3	7^{7}	6

Semifinals
PR	(Austria) D Thiem	1	4
2	(Italy) M Berrettini	6	6

== Qualifying ==
=== Seeds ===
1. (Peru) Juan Pablo Varillas (qualified)
2. (France) Corentin Moutet (qualifying competition)
3. (Chile) Nicolás Jarry (qualified)
4. (Germany) Yannick Hanfmann (qualified)
5. (Argentina) Facundo Bagnis (first round)
6. Pavel Kotov (qualifying competition)
7. (Czech Republic) Vít Kopřiva (qualifying competition)
8. (Sweden) Elias Ymer (qualified)

=== Qualifiers ===
1. (Peru) Juan Pablo Varillas
2. (Sweden) Elias Ymer
3. (Chile) Nicolás Jarry
4. (Germany) Yannick Hanfmann

=== Qualifying draw ===
==== First qualifier ====
First round
1	(Peru) Juan Pablo Varillas	6	7^{7}
Alt	(Italy) Andrea Vavassori	4	6^{3}
(Argentina) Juan Ignacio Londero	6	3	2
6	Pavel Kotov	4	6	6

Qualifying competition
1	(Peru) Juan Pablo Varillas	6	6
6	Pavel Kotov	4	1

==== Second qualifier ====
First round
2	(France) Corentin Moutet	6	6
(Italy) Giulio Zeppieri	2	4
WC	(Switzerland) Jérôme Kym	4	6^{4}
8	(Sweden) Elias Ymer	6	7^{7}

Qualifying competition
2	(France) Corentin Moutet	7	3	6^{11}
8	(Sweden) Elias Ymer	5	6	7^{13}

==== Third qualifier ====
First round
3	(Chile) Nicolás Jarry	7^{7}	7
(Italy) Flavio Cobolli	6^{5}	5
WC	(Austria) Paul Ender	1	2
7	(Czech Republic) Vít Kopřiva	6	6

Qualifying competition
3	(Chile) Nicolás Jarry	6	6
7	(Czech Republic) Vít Kopřiva	4	4

==== Fourth qualifier ====
First round
4	(Germany) Yannick Hanfmann	3	7^{7}	6
(Austria) Filip Misolic	6	6^{4}	0
(Belgium) Zizou Bergs	6	4	7^{7}
5	(Argentina) Facundo Bagnis	2	6	6^{5}

Qualifying competition
4	(Germany) Yannick Hanfmann	3	6	6
(Belgium) Zizou Bergs	6	3	2
