= 2023 Swiss Open Gstaad – Doubles =

Doubles
- 2023 Swiss Open Gstaad

Final
- Champions: (Switzerland) Dominic Stricker (Switzerland) Stan Wawrinka
- Runners-up: (Brazil) Marcelo Demoliner (Netherlands) Matwé Middelkoop
- Score: 7–6^{(10–8)}, 6–2

Events
Singles	Doubles
← 2022 ·	Swiss Open Gstaad	· 2024 →

Dominic Stricker and Stan Wawrinka defeated Marcelo Demoliner and Matwé Middelkoop in the final, 7–6^{(10–8)}, 6–2 to win the doubles tennis title at the 2023 Swiss Open Gstaad. This was the first doubles final and title in ten and a half years for Wawrinka.

Tomislav Brkić and Francisco Cabral were the reigning champions, but Brkić chose not to participate and Cabral chose to compete in Båstad instead.

== Seeds ==
1. (Brazil) Marcelo Demoliner / (Netherlands) Matwé Middelkoop (final)
2. (France) Sadio Doumbia / (France) Fabien Reboul (first round)
3. (Netherlands) Robin Haase / (Austria) Philipp Oswald (first round)
4. (Monaco) Romain Arneodo / (Austria) Sam Weissborn (quarterfinals)

== Draw ==
=== Key ===
- Q = Qualifier
- WC = Wild card
- LL = Lucky loser
- Alt = Alternate
- ITF = ITF entry
- PR = Protected ranking
- SR = Special ranking
- SE = Special exempt
- JE = Junior exempt
- JR = Junior Accelerator Programme entrant
- CO = College Accelerator Programme entrant
- NG = Next Gen Accelerator Program entrant
- w/o = Walkover
- r = Retired
- d = Defaulted

=== Draw ===
First round
1	(Brazil) M Demoliner (Netherlands) M Middelkoop	6	6
WC	(Switzerland) M Brunold (Switzerland) K Feldbausch	3	2
(India) S Balaji (China) Z Zhang	7^{7}	7^{7}
(Germany) C Frantzen (Germany) H Jebens	6^{5}	6^{3}
4	(Monaco) R Arneodo (Austria) S Weissborn	6	6
(Bolivia) B Arias (Bolivia) F Zeballos	2	2
(France) A Rinderknech (Netherlands) S Verbeek	6	3	[5]
(France) A Olivetti (Spain) D Vega Hernández	4	6	[10]
WC	(Switzerland) D Stricker (Switzerland) S Wawrinka	7	6
(Serbia) I Sabanov (Serbia) M Sabanov	5	4
(Colombia) N Barrientos (Colombia) JS Cabal	7	6
3	(Netherlands) R Haase (Austria) P Oswald	5	4
(Kazakhstan) A Golubev (Ukraine) D Molchanov	6	2	[8]
(Czech Republic) R Jebavý (Czech Republic) P Nouza	4	6	[10]
Alt	(Belgium) Z Bergs (Austria) J Rodionov	6	6
2	(France) S Doumbia (France) F Reboul	4	3

Quarterfinals
1	(Brazil) M Demoliner (Netherlands) M Middelkoop	6	4	[12]
(India) S Balaji (China) Z Zhang	4	6	[10]
4	(Monaco) R Arneodo (Austria) S Weissborn	7^{7}	4	[1]
(France) A Olivetti (Spain) D Vega Hernández	6^{2}	6	[10]
WC	(Switzerland) D Stricker (Switzerland) S Wawrinka	3	6	[10]
(Colombia) N Barrientos (Colombia) JS Cabal	6	3	[4]
(Czech Republic) R Jebavý (Czech Republic) P Nouza	6	6^{7}	[11]
Alt	(Belgium) Z Bergs (Austria) J Rodionov	4	7^{9}	[9]

Semifinals
1	(Brazil) M Demoliner (Netherlands) M Middelkoop	7	6
(France) A Olivetti (Spain) D Vega Hernández	5	2
WC	(Switzerland) D Stricker (Switzerland) S Wawrinka	6	7^{8}
(Czech Republic) R Jebavý (Czech Republic) P Nouza	3	6^{6}

Final
1	(Brazil) M Demoliner (Netherlands) M Middelkoop	6^{8}	2
WC	(Switzerland) D Stricker (Switzerland) S Wawrinka	7^{10}	6
