= 2022 Swiss Open Gstaad – Doubles =

Doubles
- 2022 Swiss Open Gstaad

Final
- Champions: (Bosnia and Herzegovina) Tomislav Brkić (Portugal) Francisco Cabral
- Runners-up: (Netherlands) Robin Haase (Austria) Philipp Oswald
- Score: 6–4, 6–4

Events
Singles	Doubles
← 2021 ·	Swiss Open Gstaad	· 2023 →

Tomislav Brkić and Francisco Cabral defeated Robin Haase and Philipp Oswald in the final, 6–4, 6–4 to win the doubles tennis title at the 2022 Swiss Open Gstaad.

Marc-Andrea Hüsler and Dominic Stricker were the defending champions, but lost in the first round to Elias and Mikael Ymer.

== Seeds ==
1. (Brazil) Rafael Matos / (Spain) David Vega Hernández (first round)
2. (Uruguay) Ariel Behar / (Kazakhstan) Andrey Golubev (first round)
3. (Belgium) Sander Gillé / (Belgium) Joran Vliegen (first round)
4. (Kazakhstan) Aleksandr Nedovyesov / (Pakistan) Aisam-ul-Haq Qureshi (first round)

== Draw ==
=== Key ===
- Q = Qualifier
- WC = Wild card
- LL = Lucky loser
- Alt = Alternate
- SE = Special exempt
- PR = Protected ranking
- ITF = ITF entry
- JE = Junior exempt
- w/o = Walkover
- r = Retired
- d = Defaulted
- SR = Special ranking

=== Draw ===
First round
1	(Brazil) R Matos (Spain) D Vega Hernández	6	6^{3}	[8]
(Bosnia and Herzegovina) T Brkić (Portugal) F Cabral	3	7^{7}	[10]
(Sweden) A Göransson (Japan) B McLachlan	6^{4}	6	[11]
(Argentina) TM Etcheverry (Chile) C Garín	7^{7}	4	[9]
3	(Belgium) S Gillé (Belgium) J Vliegen	6	5	[12]
PR	(France) F Martin (Croatia) F Škugor	4	7	[14]
WC	(Switzerland) M-A Hüsler (Switzerland) D Stricker	4	6^{5}
Alt	(Sweden) E Ymer (Sweden) M Ymer	6	7^{7}
(Netherlands) R Haase (Austria) P Oswald	6	6
(Monaco) H Nys (Poland) J Zieliński	4	4
(Spain) P Martínez (Spain) J Munar	7^{7}	6
4	(Kazakhstan) A Nedovyesov (Pakistan) A-u-H Qureshi	6^{5}	3
(Italy) L Sonego (Italy) A Vavassori	6	6
Alt	(Czech Republic) V Kopřiva; P Kotov	3	3
(Czech Republic) R Jebavý (United Kingdom) J O'Mara	6	6^{3}	[10]
2	(Uruguay) A Behar (Kazakhstan) A Golubev	3	7^{7}	[8]

Quarter-finals
(Bosnia and Herzegovina) T Brkić (Portugal) F Cabral	7^{7}	6
(Sweden) A Göransson (Japan) B McLachlan	6^{3}	3
PR	(France) F Martin (Croatia) F Škugor	3	7^{7}	[10]
Alt	(Sweden) E Ymer (Sweden) M Ymer	6	6^{3}	[2]
(Netherlands) R Haase (Austria) P Oswald	6	6
(Spain) P Martínez (Spain) J Munar	1	3
(Italy) L Sonego (Italy) A Vavassori	6	6
(Czech Republic) R Jebavý (United Kingdom) J O'Mara	2	3

Semi-finals
(Bosnia and Herzegovina) T Brkić (Portugal) F Cabral	6	6
PR	(France) F Martin (Croatia) F Škugor	3	3
(Netherlands) R Haase (Austria) P Oswald	7	3	[10]
(Italy) L Sonego (Italy) A Vavassori	5	6	[3]

Final
(Bosnia and Herzegovina) T Brkić (Portugal) F Cabral	6	6
(Netherlands) R Haase (Austria) P Oswald	4	4
