= 2024 Swiss Open Gstaad =

Tennis tournament

- Date: 15–21 July
- Edition: 56th
- Category: ATP Tour 250 Series
- Draw: 28S / 16D
- Prize money: €579,320
- Surface: Clay / outdoor
- Location: Gstaad, Switzerland
- Venue: Roy Emerson Arena

Champions

Singles
- (Italy) Matteo Berrettini

Doubles
- (India) Yuki Bhambri / (France) Albano Olivetti
← 2023 ·	Swiss Open Gstaad	· 2025 →

The 2024 Swiss Open Gstaad (also known as the EFG Swiss Open Gstaad for sponsorship reasons) was a men's tennis tournament played on outdoor clay courts. It was the 56th edition of the Swiss Open, and part of the ATP Tour 250 Series of the 2024 ATP Tour. It took place at the Roy Emerson Arena in Gstaad, Switzerland, from 15 through 21 July 2024.

== Champions ==
=== Singles ===
- (Italy) Matteo Berrettini def. (France) Quentin Halys, 6–3, 6–1

=== Doubles ===
- (India) Yuki Bhambri / (France) Albano Olivetti def. (France) Ugo Humbert / (France) Fabrice Martin, 3–6, 6–3, [10–6]

== Singles main draw entrants ==
=== Seeds ===
Country	Player	Rank^{1}	Seed
GRE	Stefanos Tsitsipas	11	1
FRA	Ugo Humbert	16	2
CAN	Félix Auger-Aliassime	17	3
ARG	Tomás Martín Etcheverry	31	4
GER	Jan-Lennard Struff	41	5
ITA	Matteo Berrettini	59	6
ITA	Fabio Fognini	94	7
SUI	Stan Wawrinka	95	8

- ^{†} Rankings are as of 1 July 2024

=== Other entrants ===
The following players received wildcards into the main draw:

- (Switzerland) Marc-Andrea Hüsler
- (Switzerland) Leandro Riedi
- (Switzerland) Dominic Stricker

The following player received entry as an emergency substitution:

- (Austria) Dominic Thiem

The following players received entry from the qualifying draw:

- (France) Titouan Droguet
- (France) Quentin Halys
- (Brazil) Gustavo Heide
- (Peru) Juan Pablo Varillas

The following player received entry as a lucky loser:

- (United States) Nicolas Moreno de Alboran

=== Withdrawals ===
- (Australia) Alex de Minaur → replaced by (Slovakia) Lukáš Klein
- (Bosnia and Herzegovina) Damir Džumhur → replaced by (United States) Nicolas Moreno de Alboran
- (Poland) Hubert Hurkacz → replaced by (Serbia) Hamad Medjedovic
- (Chile) Nicolás Jarry → replaced by (Czech Republic) Vít Kopřiva
- (United States) Tommy Paul → replaced by (Austria) Dominic Thiem

== Doubles main draw entrants ==
=== Seeds ===
Country	Player	Country	Player	Rank	Seed
GBR	Jamie Murray	CZE	Adam Pavlásek	63	1
MEX	Santiago González	TUN	Skander Mansouri	74	2
IND	Yuki Bhambri	FRA	Albano Olivetti	101	3
COL	Nicolás Barrientos	GBR	Luke Johnson	119	4
NED	Sander Arends	NED	Robin Haase	134	5
MON	Romain Arneodo	AUT	Sam Weissborn	148	6
NED	Matwe Middelkoop	UKR	Denys Molchanov	155	7
GER	Andre Begemann	ROU	Victor Vlad Cornea	162	8

- Rankings are as of 1 July 2024.

=== Other entrants ===
The following pairs received wildcards into the doubles main draw:

- (Canada) Félix Auger-Aliassime / (Switzerland) Dominic Stricker
- (Switzerland) Marc-Andrea Hüsler / (Switzerland) Leandro Riedi
