= 2019 Swiss Open Gstaad =

- Date: 22–29 July
- Edition: 52nd
- Category: ATP Tour 250 Series
- Draw: 28S / 16D
- Prize money: €482,060
- Surface: Clay / outdoor
- Location: Gstaad, Switzerland
- Venue: Roy Emerson Arena

Champions

Singles
- (Spain) Albert Ramos Viñolas

Doubles
- (Belgium) Sander Gillé / (Belgium) Joran Vliegen
- Swiss Open Gstaad

The 2019 Swiss Open Gstaad, also known as the 2019 J. Safra Sarasin Swiss Open Gstaad for sponsorship reasons, was a men's tennis tournament played on outdoor clay courts. It was the 52nd edition of the Swiss Open, and part of the ATP Tour 250 Series of the 2019 ATP Tour. It took place at the Roy Emerson Arena in Gstaad, Switzerland, from 22 July through 29 July 2019. Unseeded Albert Ramos Viñolas won the singles title.

== Finals ==
=== Singles ===
- (Spain) Albert Ramos Viñolas defeated (Germany) Cedrik-Marcel Stebe, 6–3, 6–2

=== Doubles ===
- (Belgium) Sander Gillé / (Belgium) Joran Vliegen defeated (Austria) Philipp Oswald / (Slovakia) Filip Polášek, 6–4, 6–3

== ATP singles main draw entrants ==
=== Seeds ===
Country	Player	Rank^{1}	Seed
ESP	Roberto Bautista Agut	13	1
ESP	Fernando Verdasco	26	2
SRB	Dušan Lajović	36	3
ITA	Lorenzo Sonego	51	4
POR	João Sousa	56	5
ESP	Roberto Carballés Baena	77	6
ESP	Pablo Andújar	79	7
FRA	Corentin Moutet	81	8

- ^{1} Rankings are as of July 15, 2019

=== Other entrants ===
The following players received wildcards into the singles main draw:

- (Switzerland) Sandro Ehrat
- (Switzerland) Marc-Andrea Hüsler
- (Spain) Tommy Robredo

The following players received entry using a protected ranking into the main draw:

- (Belgium) Steve Darcis
- (Germany) Cedrik-Marcel Stebe

The following players received entry from the qualifying draw:

- (Italy) Filippo Baldi
- (Colombia) Daniel Elahi Galán
- (Italy) Gian Marco Moroni
- (Austria) Dennis Novak

=== Withdrawals ===
Before the tournament

- (Italy) Matteo Berrettini →replaced by (Czech Republic) Jiří Veselý
- (Argentina) Guido Pella →replaced by (Italy) Thomas Fabbiano

== ATP doubles main draw entrants ==
=== Seeds ===
Country	Player	Country	Player	Rank^{1}	Seed
AUT	Philipp Oswald	SVK	Filip Polášek	102	1
UKR	Denys Molchanov	SVK	Igor Zelenay	132	2
ARG	Guillermo Durán	ARG	Andrés Molteni	132	3
BEL	Sander Gillé	BEL	Joran Vliegen	134	4

- Rankings are as of July 15, 2019

=== Other entrants ===
The following pairs received wildcards into the doubles main draw:

- (Switzerland) Sandro Ehrat / (Switzerland) Luca Margaroli
- (Switzerland) Marc-Andrea Hüsler / (Switzerland) Jakub Paul
