= 2026 Swiss Open Gstaad – Doubles =

Doubles
- 2026 Swiss Open Gstaad

Final
- Champions: (Austria) Lucas Miedler (Australia) Marc Polmans
- Runners-up: (Brazil) Marcelo Demoliner (United States) Robert Galloway
- Score: 6–4, 6–3

Events
Singles	Doubles
- Swiss Open Gstaad

Defending champion Lucas Miedler and his partner Marc Polmans defeated Marcelo Demoliner and Robert Galloway in the final, 6–4, 6–3 to win the doubles tennis title at the 2026 Swiss Open Gstaad. It was the pair's first event competing together.

Francisco Cabral and Miedler were the reigning champions, but Cabral chose to play in Båstad instead.

== Seeds ==
1. (Austria) Lucas Miedler / (Australia) Marc Polmans (champions)
2. (Germany) Jakob Schnaitter / (Germany) Mark Wallner (quarterfinals)
3. (France) Quentin Halys / (France) Pierre-Hugues Herbert (quarterfinals)
4. (Czech Republic) Petr Nouza / (Austria) Neil Oberleitner (first round)

== Draw ==
Key

- Q = Qualifier
- WC = Wild card
- LL = Lucky loser
- Alt = Alternate
- ITF = ITF entry
- PR = Protected ranking
- SR = Special ranking
- SE = Special exempt
- JE = Junior exempt
- JR = Junior Accelerator Programme entrant
- CO = College Accelerator Programme entrant
- NG = Next Gen Accelerator Program entrant
- w/o = Walkover
- r = Retired
- d = Defaulted

=== Draw ===
First round
1	(Austria) L Miedler (Australia) M Polmans	6	7^{7}
(Belgium) R Collignon (France) A Rinderknech	3	6^{1}
(Germany) H Jebens (Czech Republic) M Vocel	7^{8}	5	[6]
(Peru) I Buse (Spain) Í Cervantes	6^{6}	7	[10]
3	(France) Q Halys (France) P-H Herbert	6	6
(Uruguay) I Carou (Argentina) JM Cerúndolo	2	1
(Switzerland) J Paul (United States) R Seggerman	6	5	[10]
(Spain) S Martos Gornés (Spain) J Munar	3	7	[7]
(Belgium) S Gillé (Netherlands) S Verbeek	6	6
(Brazil) F Romboli (Australia) J-P Smith	4	4
WC	(Switzerland) D Dietrich (Switzerland) D Stricker	6	7^{7}
4	(Czech Republic) P Nouza (Austria) N Oberleitner	3	6^{4}
(Brazil) M Demoliner (United States) R Galloway	6	7
WC	(Switzerland) J Kym (Switzerland) S Wawrinka	4	5
(India) A Chandrasekar (Japan) T Yuzuki	4	7^{7}	[7]
2	(Germany) J Schnaitter (Germany) M Wallner	6	6^{5}	[10]

Quarterfinals
1	(Austria) L Miedler (Australia) M Polmans	6	7
(Peru) I Buse (Spain) Í Cervantes	1	5
3	(France) Q Halys (France) P-H Herbert	4	6	[7]
(Switzerland) J Paul (United States) R Seggerman	6	3	[10]
(Belgium) S Gillé (Netherlands) S Verbeek	5	6	[10]
WC	(Switzerland) D Dietrich (Switzerland) D Stricker	7	3	[5]
(Brazil) M Demoliner (United States) R Galloway	6	7
2	(Germany) J Schnaitter (Germany) M Wallner	3	5

Semifinals
1	(Austria) L Miedler (Australia) M Polmans	6	6
(Switzerland) J Paul (United States) R Seggerman	1	4
(Belgium) S Gillé (Netherlands) S Verbeek	7^{7}	4	[5]
(Brazil) M Demoliner (United States) R Galloway	6^{4}	6	[10]

Final
1	(Austria) L Miedler (Australia) M Polmans	6	6
(Brazil) M Demoliner (United States) R Galloway	3	4
