= 2026 Swiss Open Gstaad – Singles =

Singles
- 2026 Swiss Open Gstaad

Final
- Champion: (Greece) Stefanos Tsitsipas
- Runner-up: (Belgium) Raphaël Collignon
- Score: 6–4, 6–7^{(3–7)}, 6–3

Details
- Draw: 28
- Seeds: 8

Events
Singles	Doubles
- Swiss Open Gstaad

Stefanos Tsitsipas defeated Raphaël Collignon in the final, 6–4, 6–7^{(3–7)}, 6–3 to win the singles tennis title at the 2026 Swiss Open Gstaad. It was his first ATP Tour title in over a year and the 13th of his career.

Alexander Bublik was the defending champion, but lost in the second round to Quentin Halys.

== Seeds ==
The top four seeds received a bye into the second round.

1. (Kazakhstan) Alexander Bublik (second round)
2. (Norway) Casper Ruud (quarterfinals)
3. (Monaco) Valentin Vacherot (quarterfinals)
4. (France) Arthur Rinderknech (quarterfinals)
5. (Peru) Ignacio Buse (first round)
6. (Argentina) Juan Manuel Cerúndolo (semifinals)
7. (Belgium) Raphaël Collignon (final)
8. (Spain) Jaume Munar (first round)

== Draw ==
Key

- Q = Qualifier
- WC = Wild card
- LL = Lucky loser
- Alt = Alternate
- ITF = ITF entry
- PR = Protected ranking
- SR = Special ranking
- SE = Special exempt
- JE = Junior exempt
- JR = Junior Accelerator Programme entrant
- CO = College Accelerator Programme entrant
- NG = Next Gen Accelerator Program entrant
- w/o = Walkover
- r = Retired
- d = Defaulted

=== Finals ===
Semifinals
(Kazakhstan) Alexander Shevchenko	4	6	3
(Greece) Stefanos Tsitsipas	6	3	6
7	(Belgium) Raphaël Collignon	1	7^{7}	7
6	(Argentina) Juan Manuel Cerúndolo	6	6^{5}	5

Final
(Greece) Stefanos Tsitsipas	6	6^{3}	6
7	(Belgium) Raphaël Collignon	4	7^{7}	3

=== Top half ===
First round
Q	(Italy) F Cinà	3	6	6^{6}
(France) Q Halys	6	3	7^{8}
(France) A Müller	6	3	4
(Kazakhstan) A Shevchenko	3	6	6
WC	(Switzerland) D Stricker	6	6
8	(Spain) J Munar	2	4
Q	(France) C Tabur	4	7	6
(Austria) J Rodionov	6	5	4
WC	(Switzerland) J Kym	7^{7}	2	7^{7}
Q	(Switzerland) D Dietrich	6^{3}	6	6^{5}
(Greece) S Tsitsipas	6	6
5	(Peru) I Buse	4	4

Second round
1	(Kazakhstan) A Bublik	7^{7}	4	6^{5}
(France) Q Halys	6^{4}	6	7^{7}
(Kazakhstan) A Shevchenko	7^{7}	6
WC	(Switzerland) D Stricker	6^{5}	2
4	(France) A Rinderknech	6^{9}	7^{7}	7
Q	(France) C Tabur	7^{11}	6^{5}	5
WC	(Switzerland) J Kym	4	7^{7}	6^{5}
(Greece) S Tsitsipas	6	6^{2}	7^{7}

Quarterfinals
(France) Q Halys	6^{5}	3
(Kazakhstan) A Shevchenko	7^{7}	6
4	(France) A Rinderknech	3	6	3
(Greece) S Tsitsipas	6	3	6

Semifinals
(Kazakhstan) A Shevchenko	4	6	3
(Greece) S Tsitsipas	6	3	6

=== Bottom half ===
First round
7	(Belgium) R Collignon	3	7^{7}	6
Q	(Kazakhstan) T Skatov	6	6^{1}	4
(Italy) L Sonego	6	7^{7}
NG	(Austria) J Schwärzler	4	6^{4}
(Spain) P Martínez	6^{6}	1
(Germany) Y Hanfmann	7^{8}	6
6	(Argentina) JM Cerúndolo	4	6	6
(Czech Republic) Z Kolář	6	3	4
WC	(Switzerland) K Feldbausch	1	6	3
(Serbia) M Kecmanović	6	1	6
(Portugal) J Faria	6^{8}	6	6
(Switzerland) S Wawrinka	7^{10}	4	4

Second round
7	(Belgium) R Collignon	7^{7}	7^{7}
(Italy) L Sonego	6^{2}	6^{5}
(Germany) Y Hanfmann	6	3	4
3	(Monaco) V Vacherot	4	6	6
6	(Argentina) JM Cerúndolo	3	6	7
(Serbia) M Kecmanović	6	3	5
(Portugal) J Faria	7^{7}	4	2
2	(Norway) C Ruud	6^{1}	6	6

Quarterfinals
7	(Belgium) R Collignon	7^{9}	4	7
3	(Monaco) V Vacherot	6^{7}	6	5
6	(Argentina) JM Cerúndolo	3	7	6
2	(Norway) C Ruud	6	5	2

Semifinals
7	(Belgium) R Collignon	1	7^{7}	7
6	(Argentina) JM Cerúndolo	6	6^{5}	5

== Qualifying ==
=== Seeds ===
1. (Finland) Otto Virtanen (first round)
2. (Kazakhstan) Timofey Skatov (qualified)
3. (Italy) Federico Cinà (qualified)
4. (France) Clément Tabur (qualified)
5. (Ukraine) Vitaliy Sachko (qualifying competition)
6. (Lithuania) Edas Butvilas (first round)
7. (France) Pierre-Hugues Herbert (first round)
8. (France) Calvin Hemery (qualifying competition)

=== Qualifiers ===
1. (Switzerland) Dylan Dietrich
2. (Kazakhstan) Timofey Skatov
3. (Italy) Federico Cinà
4. (France) Clément Tabur

=== Qualifying draw ===
==== First qualifier ====
First round
1	(Finland) Otto Virtanen	4	6^{4}
WC	(Switzerland) Dylan Dietrich	6	7^{7}
(Brazil) Thiago Monteiro	7^{9}	6^{4}	7^{10}
7	(France) Pierre-Hugues Herbert	6^{7}	7^{7}	6^{8}

Qualifying competition
WC	(Switzerland) Dylan Dietrich	3	6	6
(Brazil) Thiago Monteiro	6	3	4

==== Second qualifier ====
First round
2	(Kazakhstan) Timofey Skatov	6	6
Alt	(India) Anirudh Chandrasekar	2	4
(India) Manas Dhamne	4	1
5	(Ukraine) Vitaliy Sachko	6	6

Qualifying competition
2	(Kazakhstan) Timofey Skatov	6	6
5	(Ukraine) Vitaliy Sachko	2	4

==== Third qualifier ====
First round
3	(Italy) Federico Cinà	7	6
(Germany) Patrick Zahraj	5	3
(Poland) Daniel Michalski	6^{2}	6	3
8	(France) Calvin Hemery	7^{7}	2	6

Qualifying competition
3	(Italy) Federico Cinà	6	6
8	(France) Calvin Hemery	4	3

==== Fourth qualifier ====
First round
4	(France) Clément Tabur	6	6
Alt	(Germany) Hendrik Jebens	3	4
(Switzerland) Marc-Andrea Hüsler	6	6
6	(Lithuania) Edas Butvilas	4	3

Qualifying competition
4	(France) Clément Tabur	6	7^{7}
(Switzerland) Marc-Andrea Hüsler	4	6^{3}
