= 2025 Swiss Open Gstaad – Doubles =

Doubles
- 2025 Swiss Open Gstaad

Final
- Champions: (Portugal) Francisco Cabral (Austria) Lucas Miedler
- Runners-up: (Germany) Hendrik Jebens (France) Albano Olivetti
- Score: 6–7^{(4–7)}, 7–6^{(7–4)}, [10–3]

Events
Singles	Doubles
- Swiss Open Gstaad

Francisco Cabral and Lucas Miedler defeated defending champion Albano Olivetti and his partner Hendrik Jebens in the final, 6–7^{(4–7)}, 7–6^{(7–4)}, [10–3] to win the doubles tennis title at the 2025 Swiss Open Gstaad. It was Cabral's third ATP Tour doubles title and Miedler's eighth.

Yuki Bhambri and Olivetti were the reigning champions, but Bhambri chose not to participate this year.

== Seeds ==
1. (Portugal) Francisco Cabral / (Austria) Lucas Miedler (champions)
2. (Germany) Jakob Schnaitter / (Germany) Mark Wallner (quarterfinals)
3. (Germany) Hendrik Jebens / (France) Albano Olivetti (final)
4. (Germany) Constantin Frantzen / (Netherlands) Robin Haase (quarterfinals)

== Draw ==
Key

- Q = Qualifier
- WC = Wild card
- LL = Lucky loser
- Alt = Alternate
- ITF = ITF entry
- PR = Protected ranking
- SR = Special ranking
- SE = Special exempt
- JE = Junior exempt
- JR = Junior Accelerator Programme entrant
- CO = College Accelerator Programme entrant
- NG = Next Gen Accelerator Program entrant
- w/o = Walkover
- r = Retired
- d = Defaulted

=== Draw ===
First round
1	(Portugal) F Cabral (Austria) L Miedler	6	6
(Argentina) F Comesaña (Argentina) TM Etcheverry	3	4
(Czech Republic) P Nouza (Czech Republic) P Rikl	7^{8}	6^{5}	[9]
(Netherlands) M Middelkoop (Netherlands) J-J Rojer	6^{6}	7^{7}	[11]
4	(Germany) C Frantzen (Netherlands) R Haase	4	6	[10]
(Poland) P Matuszewski (Australia) MC Romios	6	3	[8]
(India) S Balaji (India) RC Bollipalli	4	7^{10}	[7]
WC	(Switzerland) J Paul (Switzerland) D Stricker	6	6^{8}	[10]
PR	(France) N Mahut (France) A Rinderknech	7^{7}	4	[10]
(Ecuador) G Escobar (Ecuador) D Hidalgo	6^{4}	6	[12]
WC	(Switzerland) H Bernet (Switzerland) S Wawrinka	4	4
3	(Germany) H Jebens (France) A Olivetti	6	6
(Colombia) N Barrientos (Mexico) MÁ Reyes-Varela	5	3
PR	(India) A Kadhe (India) VS Prashanth	7	6
(Brazil) M Demoliner (Tunisia) S Mansouri	2	4
2	(Germany) J Schnaitter (Germany) M Wallner	6	6

Quarterfinals
1	(Portugal) F Cabral (Austria) L Miedler	7^{10}	7^{7}
(Netherlands) M Middelkoop (Netherlands) J-J Rojer	6^{8}	6^{2}
4	(Germany) C Frantzen (Netherlands) R Haase	6^{4}	3
WC	(Switzerland) J Paul (Switzerland) D Stricker	7^{7}	6
(Ecuador) G Escobar (Ecuador) D Hidalgo	5	3
3	(Germany) H Jebens (France) A Olivetti	7	6
PR	(India) A Kadhe (India) VS Prashanth	6	7^{7}
2	(Germany) J Schnaitter (Germany) M Wallner	3	6^{5}

Semifinals
1	(Portugal) F Cabral (Austria) L Miedler	6	7^{7}
WC	(Switzerland) J Paul (Switzerland) D Stricker	1	6^{5}
3	(Germany) H Jebens (France) A Olivetti	7	7
PR	(India) A Kadhe (India) VS Prashanth	5	5

Final
1	(Portugal) F Cabral (Austria) L Miedler	6^{4}	7^{7}	[10]
3	(Germany) H Jebens (France) A Olivetti	7^{7}	6^{4}	[3]
