= 2025 Swiss Open Gstaad =

Tennis tournament

- Date: 14–20 July
- Edition: 57th
- Category: ATP 250
- Draw: 28S / 16D
- Surface: Clay / outdoor
- Location: Gstaad, Switzerland
- Venue: Roy Emerson Arena

Champions

Singles
- (Kazakhstan) Alexander Bublik

Doubles
- (Portugal) Francisco Cabral / (Austria) Lucas Miedler
← 2024 ·	Swiss Open Gstaad	· 2026 →

The 2025 Swiss Open Gstaad (also known as the EFG Swiss Open Gstaad for sponsorship reasons) was a men's tennis tournament played on outdoor clay courts. It was the 57th edition of the Swiss Open, and part of the ATP 250 tournaments of the 2025 ATP Tour. It took place at the Roy Emerson Arena in Gstaad, Switzerland, from 14 through 20 July 2025.

== Champions ==
=== Singles ===
- (Kazakhstan) Alexander Bublik def. (Argentina) Juan Manuel Cerúndolo 6–4, 4–6, 6–3

=== Doubles ===
- (Portugal) Francisco Cabral / (Austria) Lucas Miedler def. (Germany) Hendrik Jebens / (France) Albano Olivetti, 6–7^{(4–7)}, 7–6^{(7–4)}, [10–3]

== Singles main draw entrants ==
=== Seeds ===
Country	Player	Rank^{1}	Seed
NOR	Casper Ruud	15	1
KAZ	Alexander Bublik	31	2
~~ESP~~	~~Pedro Martínez~~	~~52~~	~~3~~
ARG	Tomás Martín Etcheverry	53	4
SRB	Laslo Djere	60	5
BEL	David Goffin	63	6
ARG	Francisco Comesaña	65	7
FRA	Arthur Rinderknech	72	8

- ^{†} Rankings are as of 30 June 2025

=== Other entrants ===
The following players received wildcards into the main draw:

- (Belgium) David Goffin
- (Switzerland) Jérôme Kym
- (Switzerland) Dominic Stricker

The following player received entry through the Next Gen Accelerator programme:

- (Spain) Martín Landaluce

The following player received entry as an emergency subtitution:

- (Switzerland) Stan Wawrinka

The following players received entry from the qualifying draw:

- (Peru) Ignacio Buse
- (France) Calvin Hemery
- (Italy) Francesco Passaro
- (Argentina) Marco Trungelliti

The following player received entry as a lucky loser:

- (Germany) Patrick Zahraj

=== Withdrawals ===
- (Italy) Matteo Berrettini → replaced by (France) Arthur Cazaux
- (Croatia) Marin Čilić → replaced by (Czech Republic) Dalibor Svrčina
- (Colombia) Daniel Elahi Galán → replaced by (Georgia (country)) Nikoloz Basilashvili
- (Chile) Cristian Garin → replaced by (France) Térence Atmane
- (Spain) Pedro Martínez → replaced by (Germany) Patrick Zahraj
- (Finland) Otto Virtanen → replaced by (Argentina) Román Andrés Burruchaga
- (Germany) Alexander Zverev → replaced by (Switzerland) Stan Wawrinka

== Doubles main draw entrants ==
=== Seeds ===
Country	Player	Country	Player	Rank	Seed
POR	Francisco Cabral	AUT	Lucas Miedler	87	1
GER	Jakob Schnaitter	GER	Mark Wallner	120	2
GER	Hendrik Jebens	FRA	Albano Olivetti	126	3
GER	Constantin Frantzen	NED	Robin Haase	127	4

- Rankings are as of 30 June 2025.

=== Other entrants ===
The following pairs received wildcards into the doubles main draw:

- (Switzerland) Henry Bernet / (Switzerland) Stan Wawrinka
- (Switzerland) Jakub Paul / (Switzerland) Dominic Stricker

=== Withdrawals ===
- (Spain) Íñigo Cervantes / (Spain) Pedro Martínez → replaced by (Netherlands) Matwé Middelkoop / (Netherlands) Jean-Julien Rojer
- (Tunisia) Skander Mansouri / (Netherlands) David Pel → replaced by (Brazil) Marcelo Demoliner / (Tunisia) Skander Mansouri
