= 2023 Swiss Open Gstaad – Singles =

Singles
- 2023 Swiss Open Gstaad

Final
- Champion: (Argentina) Pedro Cachin
- Runner-up: (Spain) Albert Ramos Viñolas
- Score: 3–6, 6–0, 7–5

Details
- Draw: 28
- Seeds: 8

Events
Singles	Doubles
← 2022 ·	Swiss Open Gstaad	· 2024 →

Pedro Cachin defeated Albert Ramos Viñolas in the final, 3–6, 6–0, 7–5, to win the singles tennis title at the 2023 Swiss Open Gstaad. It was his first ATP Tour title.

Casper Ruud was the two-time reigning champion, but chose to compete in Båstad instead.

== Seeds ==
The top four seeds received a bye into the second round.

1. (Spain) Roberto Bautista Agut (second round)
2. (Serbia) Miomir Kecmanović (semifinals)
3. (Italy) Lorenzo Sonego (second round)
4. (Germany) Yannick Hanfmann (quarterfinals)
5. (China) Zhang Zhizhen (first round)
6. (Spain) Roberto Carballés Baena (first round, retired)
7. (Sweden) Mikael Ymer (suspended for violating anti-doping rules)
8. (Serbia) Laslo Djere (first round)

== Draw ==
Key

- Q = Qualifier
- WC = Wild card
- LL = Lucky loser
- Alt = Alternate
- ITF = ITF entry
- PR = Protected ranking
- SR = Special ranking
- SE = Special exempt
- JE = Junior exempt
- JR = Junior Accelerator Programme entrant
- CO = College Accelerator Programme entrant
- NG = Next Gen Accelerator Program entrant
- w/o = Walkover
- r = Retired
- d = Defaulted

=== Finals ===
Semifinals
(Argentina) Pedro Cachin	6	6
Q	(Serbia) Hamad Medjedovic	3	1
(Spain) Albert Ramos Viñolas	6	6
2	(Serbia) Miomir Kecmanović	2	3

Final
(Argentina) Pedro Cachin	3	6	7
(Spain) Albert Ramos Viñolas	6	0	5

=== Top half ===
First round
(Argentina) P Cachin	6	6
(Japan) T Daniel	4	1
(Spain) J Munar	6	6
WC	(Switzerland) A Ritschard	3	3
(Switzerland) S Wawrinka	6	3
6	(Spain) R Carballés Baena	1	1^{r}
(France) B Bonzi	3	4
(Germany) D Altmaier	6	6
(France) A Müller	1	6^{4}
(Austria) D Thiem	6	7^{7}
Q	(Serbia) H Medjedovic	4	6	6
5	(China) Z Zhang	6	1	4

Second round
1	(Spain) R Bautista Agut	6^{4}	6^{3}
(Argentina) P Cachin	7^{7}	7^{7}
(Spain) J Munar	7^{7}	6
(Switzerland) S Wawrinka	6^{3}	1
4	(Germany) Y Hanfmann	4	6	7
(Germany) D Altmaier	6	2	5
(Austria) D Thiem	5	6	3
Q	(Serbia) H Medjedovic	7	2	6

Quarterfinals
(Argentina) P Cachin	6	6
(Spain) J Munar	3	3
4	(Germany) Y Hanfmann	3	3
Q	(Serbia) H Medjedovic	6	6

Semifinals
(Argentina) P Cachin	6	6
Q	(Serbia) H Medjedovic	3	1

=== Bottom half ===
First round
LL	(Finland) O Virtanen	2	3
(Peru) JP Varillas	6	6
(France) A Rinderknech	2	6	3
Q	(Argentina) F Bagnis	6	2	6
(Spain) A Ramos Viñolas	6	2	6
WC	(Italy) F Fognini	1	6	2
8	(Serbia) L Djere	0	6	3
Q	(Belgium) Z Bergs	6	4	6
(Switzerland) M-A Hüsler	3	5
Q	(Austria) J Rodionov	6	7
(France) A Fils	6^{4}	6^{4}
WC	(Switzerland) D Stricker	7^{7}	7^{7}

Second round
(Peru) JP Varillas	6	6
Q	(Argentina) F Bagnis	2	1
(Spain) A Ramos Viñolas	6	3	6
3	(Italy) L Sonego	3	6	4
Q	(Belgium) Z Bergs	7^{10}	4	7^{7}
Q	(Austria) J Rodionov	6^{8}	6	6^{4}
WC	(Switzerland) D Stricker	6^{4}	1
2	(Serbia) M Kecmanović	7^{7}	6

Quarterfinals
(Peru) JP Varillas	7^{7}	1	4
(Spain) A Ramos Viñolas	6^{2}	6	6
Q	(Belgium) Z Bergs	4	6	5
2	(Serbia) M Kecmanović	6	3	7

Semifinals
(Spain) A Ramos Viñolas	6	6
2	(Serbia) M Kecmanović	2	3

== Qualifying ==
=== Seeds ===
1. (Austria) Jurij Rodionov (qualified)
2. (Argentina) Facundo Bagnis (qualified)
3. (Finland) Otto Virtanen (qualifying competition, lucky loser)
4. (Brazil) Thiago Seyboth Wild (first round)
5. (Argentina) Thiago Agustín Tirante (first round)
6. (Italy) Raúl Brancaccio (first round)
7. Ivan Gakhov (first round)
8. (Serbia) Hamad Medjedovic (qualified)

=== Qualifiers ===
1. (Austria) Jurij Rodionov
2. (Argentina) Facundo Bagnis
3. (Serbia) Hamad Medjedovic
4. (Belgium) Zizou Bergs

=== Lucky loser ===
1. (Finland) Otto Virtanen

=== Qualifying draw ===
==== First qualifier ====
First round
1	(Austria) Jurij Rodionov	6	7^{7}
WC	(Switzerland) Mika Brunold	1	6^{1}
(Austria) Maximilian Neuchrist	6	6
7	Ivan Gakhov	3	3

Qualifying competition
1	(Austria) Jurij Rodionov	6	6
(Austria) Maximilian Neuchrist	3	4

==== Second qualifier ====
First round
2	(Argentina) Facundo Bagnis	7^{7}	6
WC	(Switzerland) Kilian Feldbausch	6^{3}	3
(France) Geoffrey Blancaneaux	6	6
6	(Italy) Raúl Brancaccio	4	3

Qualifying competition
2	(Argentina) Facundo Bagnis	6	6
(France) Geoffrey Blancaneaux	3	2

==== Third qualifier ====
First round
3	(Finland) Otto Virtanen	6	7^{7}
(Italy) Alexander Weis	3	6^{4}
(Italy) Federico Gaio	3	6^{4}
8	(Serbia) Hamad Medjedovic	6	7^{7}

Qualifying competition
3	(Finland) Otto Virtanen	6^{5}	4
8	(Serbia) Hamad Medjedovic	7^{7}	6

==== Fourth qualifier ====
First round
4	(Brazil) Thiago Seyboth Wild	6	2	6^{4}
(Belgium) Zizou Bergs	3	6	7^{7}
(Argentina) Marco Trungelliti	6	6
5	(Argentina) Thiago Agustín Tirante	3	3

Qualifying competition
(Belgium) Zizou Bergs	6	6
(Argentina) Marco Trungelliti	3	4
