= 2021 Swiss Open Gstaad – Singles =

Tennis tournament

Singles
- 2021 Swiss Open Gstaad

Final
- Champion: (Norway) Casper Ruud
- Runner-up: (France) Hugo Gaston
- Score: 6–3, 6–2

Details
- Draw: 28 (4 Q / 3 WC )
- Seeds: 8

Events
Singles	Doubles
- Swiss Open Gstaad

Casper Ruud defeated Hugo Gaston in the final, 6–3, 6–2, to win the men's singles tennis title at the 2021 Swiss Open.

Albert Ramos Viñolas was the reigning champion from when the tournament was last held in 2019, but chose to compete in Umag instead.

== Seeds ==
The top four seeds receive a bye into the second round.

1. (Canada) Denis Shapovalov (second round)
2. (Spain) Roberto Bautista Agut (second round)
3. (Norway) Casper Ruud (champion)
4. (Chile) Cristian Garín (quarterfinals)
5. (Argentina) Federico Delbonis (second round)
6. (France) Benoît Paire (quarterfinals)
7. (Serbia) Laslo Đere (semifinals)
8. (Spain) Feliciano López (second round)

== Draw ==
Key

- Q = Qualifier
- WC = Wild card
- LL = Lucky loser
- Alt = Alternate
- ITF = ITF entry
- PR = Protected ranking
- SR = Special ranking
- SE = Special exempt
- JE = Junior exempt
- JR = Junior Accelerator Programme entrant
- CO = College Accelerator Programme entrant
- NG = Next Gen Accelerator Program entrant
- w/o = Walkover
- r = Retired
- d = Defaulted

=== Finals ===
Semifinals
Q	(Czech Republic) Vít Kopřiva	3	0
3	(Norway) Casper Ruud	6	6
(France) Hugo Gaston	3	6	6
7	(Serbia) Laslo Đere	6	3	3

Final
3	(Norway) Casper Ruud	6	6
(France) Hugo Gaston	3	2

=== Top half ===
First round
WC	(Switzerland) J Nikles	2	1
Q	(Czech Republic) V Kopřiva	6	6
(Sweden) M Ymer	4	6	6
LL	(France) E Couacaud	6	3	3
(Switzerland) M-A Hüsler	4	6	5^{r}
8	(Spain) F López	6	4	6
LL	(Poland) K Żuk	4	4
(Austria) D Novak	6	6
(Netherlands) T Griekspoor	7	4	7^{7}
(Argentina) JI Londero	5	6	6^{1}
(Slovakia) J Kovalík	3	6^{2}
6	(France) B Paire	6	7^{7}

Second round
1	(Canada) D Shapovalov	6	3	2
Q	(Czech Republic) V Kopřiva	2	6	6
(Sweden) M Ymer	6^{6}	7^{9}	6
8	(Spain) F López	7^{8}	6^{7}	4
3	(Norway) C Ruud	6	7^{7}
(Austria) D Novak	4	6^{5}
(Netherlands) T Griekspoor	4	0^{r}
6	(France) B Paire	6	0

Quarterfinals
Q	(Czech Republic) V Kopřiva	6	6
(Sweden) M Ymer	1	0
3	(Norway) C Ruud	6	5	6
6	(France) B Paire	2	7	3

Semifinals
Q	(Czech Republic) V Kopřiva	3	0
3	(Norway) C Ruud	6	6

=== Bottom half ===
First round
5	(Argentina) F Delbonis	6	6
WC	(Switzerland) L Riedi	3	3
(France) H Gaston	6	6
(Argentina) JM Cerúndolo	4	2
(Australia) M Polmans	7	6
Q	(Switzerland) S Ehrat	5	3
7	(Serbia) L Đere	6	6
(Brazil) T Seyboth Wild	4	3
Q	(Germany) O Otte	6^{3}	1
Q	(Belgium) Z Bergs	7^{7}	6
(France) A Rinderknech	6	6
WC	(Switzerland) D Stricker	4	4

Second round
5	(Argentina) F Delbonis	0	7^{7}	6^{3}
(France) H Gaston	6	6^{2}	7^{7}
(Australia) M Polmans	3	0
4	(Chile) C Garín	6	6
7	(Serbia) L Đere	6	4	6
Q	(Belgium) Z Bergs	2	6	2
(France) A Rinderknech	6	6
2	(Spain) R Bautista Agut	2	4

Quarterfinals
(France) H Gaston	6	1	7^{13}
4	(Chile) C Garín	4	6	6^{11}
7	(Serbia) L Đere	6	6^{5}	6
(France) A Rinderknech	4	7^{7}	4

Semifinals
(France) H Gaston	3	6	6
7	(Serbia) L Đere	6	3	3

== Qualifying ==
=== Seeds ===
1. (Germany) Oscar Otte (qualified)
2. (Poland) Kacper Żuk (qualifying competition, lucky loser)
3. (France) Enzo Couacaud (qualifying competition, lucky loser)
4. (Canada) Steven Diez (qualifying competition)
5. (Latvia) Ernests Gulbis (first round)
6. (Germany) Maximilian Marterer (first round)
7. (Australia) Aleksandar Vukic (first round)
8. (Italy) Roberto Marcora (qualifying competition)

=== Qualifiers ===
1. (Germany) Oscar Otte
2. (Switzerland) Sandro Ehrat
3. (Czech Republic) Vít Kopřiva
4. (Belgium) Zizou Bergs

=== Lucky losers ===
1. (Poland) Kacper Żuk
2. (France) Enzo Couacaud

=== Qualifying draw ===
==== First qualifier ====
First round
1	(Germany) Oscar Otte	6	6
(Italy) Andrea Pellegrino	2	4
Alt	(Ecuador) Gonzalo Escobar	6	4	6^{6}
8	(Italy) Roberto Marcora	1	6	7^{8}

Qualifying competition
1	(Germany) Oscar Otte	6	6
8	(Italy) Roberto Marcora	4	3

==== Second qualifier ====
First round
2	(Poland) Kacper Żuk	6	3	6
Alt	(Italy) Andrea Vavassori	3	6	2
WC	(Switzerland) Sandro Ehrat	6	6
5	(Latvia) Ernests Gulbis	3	4

Qualifying competition
2	(Poland) Kacper Żuk	6	4	2
WC	(Switzerland) Sandro Ehrat	2	6	6

==== Third qualifier ====
First round
3	(France) Enzo Couacaud	6	6
(Brazil) Pedro Sakamoto	1	3
(Czech Republic) Vít Kopřiva	6	6
6	(Germany) Maximilian Marterer	2	3

Qualifying competition
3	(France) Enzo Couacaud	6	6^{5}	4
(Czech Republic) Vít Kopřiva	2	7^{7}	6

==== Fourth qualifier ====
First round
4	(Canada) Steven Diez	6	6
WC	(Switzerland) Damien Wenger	2	4
(Belgium) Zizou Bergs	7^{7}	6
7	(Australia) Aleksandar Vukic	6^{5}	3

Qualifying competition
4	(Canada) Steven Diez	6^{5}	4
(Belgium) Zizou Bergs	7^{7}	6
