= 2019 Swiss Open Gstaad – Doubles =

Doubles
- 2019 Swiss Open Gstaad

Final
- Champions: (Belgium) Sander Gillé (Belgium) Joran Vliegen
- Runners-up: (Austria) Philipp Oswald (Slovakia) Filip Polášek
- Score: 6–4, 6–3

Events
Singles	Doubles
← 2018 ·	Swiss Open Gstaad	· 2021 →

Matteo Berrettini and Daniele Bracciali were the defending champions, but chose not to participate this year.

Sander Gillé and Joran Vliegen won the title, defeating Philipp Oswald and Filip Polášek in the final, 6–4, 6–3.

== Seeds ==
1. (Austria) Philipp Oswald / (Slovakia) Filip Polášek (final)
2. (Ukraine) Denys Molchanov / (Slovakia) Igor Zelenay (first round)
3. (Argentina) Guillermo Durán / (Argentina) Andrés Molteni (semifinals)
4. (Belgium) Sander Gillé / (Belgium) Joran Vliegen (champions)

== Draw ==
=== Key ===
- Q = Qualifier
- WC = Wild card
- LL = Lucky loser
- Alt = Alternate
- SE = Special exempt
- PR = Protected ranking
- ITF = ITF entry
- JE = Junior exempt
- w/o = Walkover
- r = Retired
- d = Defaulted
- SR = Special ranking

=== Draw ===
First round
1	(Austria) P Oswald (Slovakia) F Polášek	6	7
WC	(Switzerland) S Ehrat (Switzerland) L Margaroli	4	5
(Italy) S Bolelli (Portugal) J Sousa	6	7^{7}
(Serbia) N Čačić (Serbia) D Lajović	4	6^{4}
3	(Argentina) G Durán (Argentina) A Molteni	4	6	[10]
(Italy) P Lorenzi (Italy) L Sonego	6	3	[6]
(Spain) R Carballés Baena (Spain) J Munar	6	6
(United States) J Cerretani (Italy) T Fabbiano	1	4
(Chinese Taipei) C-p Hsieh (Indonesia) C Rungkat	3	4
PR	(Philippines) T Huey (Denmark) F Nielsen	6	6
(Spain) P Andújar (Spain) G Granollers	6	2	[6]
4	(Belgium) S Gillé (Belgium) J Vliegen	3	6	[10]
(Japan) T Daniel (Tunisia) M Jaziri	0	5
WC	(Switzerland) M-A Hüsler (Switzerland) J Paul	6	7
(India) J Nedunchezhiyan (India) P Raja	6	6
2	(Ukraine) D Molchanov (Slovakia) I Zelenay	4	2

Quarterfinals
1	(Austria) P Oswald (Slovakia) F Polášek	6	6
(Italy) S Bolelli (Portugal) J Sousa	3	2
3	(Argentina) G Durán (Argentina) A Molteni	4	6	[10]
(Spain) R Carballés Baena (Spain) J Munar	6	2	[6]
PR	(Philippines) T Huey (Denmark) F Nielsen	4	6^{5}
4	(Belgium) S Gillé (Belgium) J Vliegen	6	7^{7}
WC	(Switzerland) M-A Hüsler (Switzerland) J Paul	7	6
(India) J Nedunchezhiyan (India) P Raja	5	4

Semifinals
1	(Austria) P Oswald (Slovakia) F Polášek	7^{7}	7
3	(Argentina) G Durán (Argentina) A Molteni	6^{5}	5
4	(Belgium) S Gillé (Belgium) J Vliegen	6	6
WC	(Switzerland) M-A Hüsler (Switzerland) J Paul	4	4

Final
1	(Austria) P Oswald (Slovakia) F Polášek	4	3
4	(Belgium) S Gillé (Belgium) J Vliegen	6	6
