= 2021 Swiss Open Gstaad =

Tennis tournament

- Date: 19–25 July
- Edition: 53rd
- Category: ATP Tour 250 Series
- Draw: 28S / 16D
- Prize money: €419,470
- Surface: Clay / outdoor
- Location: Gstaad, Switzerland
- Venue: Roy Emerson Arena

Champions

Singles
- (Norway) Casper Ruud

Doubles
- (Switzerland) Marc-Andrea Hüsler / (Switzerland) Dominic Stricker
- Swiss Open Gstaad

The 2021 Swiss Open Gstaad was a men's tennis tournament played on outdoor clay courts. It was the 53rd edition of the Swiss Open, and part of the ATP Tour 250 Series of the 2021 ATP Tour. It took place at the Roy Emerson Arena in Gstaad, Switzerland, from 19 July through 25 July 2021.

== Finals ==
=== Singles ===
- (Norway) Casper Ruud defeated (France) Hugo Gaston, 6–3, 6–2

=== Doubles ===
- (Switzerland) Marc-Andrea Hüsler / (Switzerland) Dominic Stricker defeated (Poland) Szymon Walków / (Poland) Jan Zieliński, 6–1, 7–6^{(9–7)}

== Points and prize money ==
=== Point distribution ===
Event	W	F	SF	QF	Round of 16	Round of 32	Q	Q2	Q1
Singles	250	150	90	45	20	0	12	6	0
Doubles	250	150	90	45	0	—N/a	—N/a	—N/a	—N/a

=== Prize money ===
Event	W	F	SF	QF	Round of 16	Round of 32	Q2	Q1
Singles	€41,145	€29,500	€21,000	€14,000	€9,000	€5,415	€2,645	€1,375
Doubles*	€15,360	€11,000	€7,250	€4,710	€2,760	—N/a	—N/a	—N/a

_{*per team}

== Singles main draw entrants ==
=== Seeds ===
Country	Player	Rank^{1}	Seed
CAN	Denis Shapovalov	10	1
ESP	Roberto Bautista Agut	14	2
NOR	Casper Ruud	16	3
CHI	Cristian Garín	18	4
ARG	Federico Delbonis	48	5
FRA	Benoît Paire	51	6
SRB	Laslo Đere	57	7
ESP	Feliciano López	90	8

- ^{1} Rankings are as of July 12, 2021

=== Other entrants ===
The following players received wildcards into the main draw:

- (Switzerland) Johan Nikles
- (Switzerland) Leandro Riedi
- (Switzerland) Dominic Stricker

The following players received entry from the qualifying draw:

- (Belgium) Zizou Bergs
- (Switzerland) Sandro Ehrat
- (Czech Republic) Vít Kopřiva
- (Germany) Oscar Otte

The following players received entry as lucky losers:

- (France) Enzo Couacaud
- (Poland) Kacper Żuk

=== Withdrawals ===
Before the tournament

- (Argentina) Facundo Bagnis → replaced by (Argentina) Juan Ignacio Londero
- (Spain) Roberto Carballés Baena → replaced by (Netherlands) Tallon Griekspoor
- (Argentina) Federico Coria → replaced by (France) Hugo Gaston
- (Slovakia) Norbert Gombos → replaced by (Austria) Dennis Novak
- (Germany) Yannick Hanfmann → replaced by (Poland) Kacper Żuk
- (Germany) Philipp Kohlschreiber → replaced by (France) Enzo Couacaud
- (Poland) Kamil Majchrzak → replaced by (Switzerland) Marc-Andrea Hüsler
- (Austria) Dominic Thiem → replaced by (France) Arthur Rinderknech
- (France) Jo-Wilfried Tsonga → replaced by (Australia) Marc Polmans
- (Spain) Fernando Verdasco → replaced by (Brazil) Thiago Seyboth Wild

=== Retirements ===
- (Netherlands) Tallon Griekspoor
- (Switzerland) Marc-Andrea Hüsler

== Doubles main draw entrants ==
=== Seeds ===
Country	Player	Country	Player	Rank^{1}	Seed
NED	Robin Haase	NED	Matwé Middelkoop	79	1
URU	Ariel Behar	ECU	Gonzalo Escobar	96	2
MON	Hugo Nys	ITA	Andrea Vavassori	130	3
SWE	André Göransson	DEN	Frederik Nielsen	160	4

- ^{1} Rankings are as of 12 July 2021.

=== Other entrants ===
The following pairs received wildcards into the doubles main draw:

- (Switzerland) Marc-Andrea Hüsler / (Switzerland) Dominic Stricker
- (Switzerland) Jakub Paul / (Switzerland) Leandro Riedi

=== Withdrawals ===
Before the tournament

- (Poland) Kamil Majchrzak / (Poland) Szymon Walków → replaced by (Poland) Szymon Walków / (Poland) Jan Zieliński
- (Sweden) Elias Ymer / (Sweden) Mikael Ymer → replaced by (Germany) Dustin Brown / (Austria) Tristan-Samuel Weissborn
- (Germany) Yannick Hanfmann / (Australia) Marc Polmans → replaced by (Belgium) Zizou Bergs / (Netherlands) Tallon Griekspoor

During the tournament

- (Belgium) Zizou Bergs / (Netherlands) Tallon Griekspoor

=== Retirements ===
- (Netherlands) Sander Arends / (Netherlands) David Pel
