= 2022 Swiss Open Gstaad =

Tennis tournament

- Date: 18–24 July
- Edition: 54th
- Category: ATP Tour 250 Series
- Draw: 28S / 16D
- Prize money: €534,555
- Surface: Clay / outdoor
- Location: Gstaad, Switzerland
- Venue: Roy Emerson Arena

Champions

Singles
- (Norway) Casper Ruud

Doubles
- (Bosnia and Herzegovina) Tomislav Brkić / (Portugal) Francisco Cabral
- Swiss Open Gstaad

The 2022 Swiss Open Gstaad was a men's tennis tournament played on outdoor clay courts. It was the 54th edition of the Swiss Open, and part of the ATP Tour 250 Series of the 2022 ATP Tour. It took place at the Roy Emerson Arena in Gstaad, Switzerland, from 18 July through 24 July 2022. First-seeded Casper Ruud won the singles title.

== Finals ==
=== Singles ===
- (Norway) Casper Ruud defeated (Italy) Matteo Berrettini, 4–6, 7–6^{(7–4)}, 6–2

=== Doubles ===
- (Bosnia and Herzegovina) Tomislav Brkić / (Portugal) Francisco Cabral defeated (Netherlands) Robin Haase / (Austria) Philipp Oswald, 6–4, 6–4

== Points and prize money ==
=== Point distribution ===
Event	W	F	SF	QF	Round of 16	Round of 32	Q	Q2	Q1
Singles	250	150	90	45	20	0	12	6	0
Doubles	250	150	90	45	0	—N/a	—N/a	—N/a	—N/a

=== Prize money ===
Event	W	F	SF	QF	Round of 16	Round of 32	Q2	Q1
Singles	€41,145	€29,500	€21,000	€14,000	€9,000	€5,415	€2,645	€1,375
Doubles*	€15,360	€11,000	€7,250	€4,710	€2,760	—N/a	—N/a	—N/a

_{*per team}

== Singles main draw entrants ==
=== Seeds ===
Country	Player	Rank^{1}	Seed
NOR	Casper Ruud	5	1
ITA	Matteo Berrettini	15	2
ESP	Roberto Bautista Agut	20	3
ESP	Albert Ramos Viñolas	38	4
ESP	Pedro Martínez	51	5
CHI	Cristian Garín	56	6
FRA	Hugo Gaston	58	7
POR	João Sousa	60	8

- ^{†} Rankings are as of 11 July 2022

=== Other entrants ===
The following players received wildcards into the main draw:

- (Switzerland) Marc-Andrea Hüsler
- (Switzerland) Alexander Ritschard
- (Switzerland) Dominic Stricker

The following players received entry from the qualifying draw:

- (Germany) Yannick Hanfmann
- (Chile) Nicolás Jarry
- (Peru) Juan Pablo Varillas
- (Sweden) Elias Ymer

The following player received entry with a protected ranking:

- (Austria) Dominic Thiem

=== Withdrawals ===
- (France) Arthur Rinderknech → replaced by (Spain) Bernabé Zapata Miralles

== Doubles main draw entrants ==
=== Seeds ===
Country	Player	Country	Player	Rank^{1}	Seed
BRA	Rafael Matos	ESP	David Vega Hernández	77	1
URU	Ariel Behar	KAZ	Andrey Golubev	82	2
BEL	Sander Gillé	BEL	Joran Vliegen	96	3
KAZ	Aleksandr Nedovyesov	PAK	Aisam-Ul-Haq Qureshi	111	4

- ^{†} Rankings are as of 11 July 2022

=== Other entrants ===
The following pairs received wildcards into the doubles main draw:

- ~~(Italy) Jacopo Berrettini / (Italy) Matteo Berrettini~~
- (Switzerland) Marc-Andrea Hüsler / (Switzerland) Dominic Stricker

The following pairs received entry as alternates:

- (Czech Republic) Vít Kopřiva / Pavel Kotov
- (Sweden) Elias Ymer / (Sweden) Mikael Ymer

=== Withdrawals ===
- (Italy) Jacopo Berrettini / (Italy) Matteo Berrettini → replaced by (Czech Republic) Vít Kopřiva / Pavel Kotov
- (France) Benoît Paire / (Portugal) João Sousa → replaced by (Sweden) Elias Ymer / (Sweden) Mikael Ymer
