= 2024 Swiss Open Gstaad – Singles =

Singles
- 2024 Swiss Open Gstaad

Final
- Champion: (Italy) Matteo Berrettini
- Runner-up: (France) Quentin Halys
- Score: 6–3, 6–1

Details
- Draw: 28
- Seeds: 8

Events
Singles	Doubles
← 2023 ·	Swiss Open Gstaad	· 2025 →

Matteo Berrettini defeated Quentin Halys in the final, 6–3, 6–1 to win the singles tennis title at the 2024 Swiss Open Gstaad. He did not drop a set en route to his second title in Gstaad (after 2018) and ninth ATP Tour title overall. Halys was the first qualifier to reach the final since Yannick Hanfmann in 2017.

Pedro Cachín was the defending champion but lost to Berrettini in the first round.

== Seeds ==
The top four seeds received a bye into the second round.

1. (Greece) Stefanos Tsitsipas (semifinals)
2. (France) Ugo Humbert (second round)
3. (Canada) Félix Auger-Aliassime (quarterfinals)
4. (Argentina) Tomás Martín Etcheverry (quarterfinals)
5. (Germany) Jan-Lennard Struff (semifinals)
6. (Italy) Matteo Berrettini (champion)
7. (Italy) Fabio Fognini (quarterfinals)
8. (Switzerland) Stan Wawrinka (first round)

== Draw ==
=== Key ===
- Q = Qualifier
- WC = Wild card
- LL = Lucky loser
- Alt = Alternate
- ITF = ITF entry
- PR = Protected ranking
- SR = Special ranking
- SE = Special exempt
- JE = Junior exempt
- JR = Junior Accelerator Programme entrant
- CO = College Accelerator Programme entrant
- NG = Next Gen Accelerator Program entrant
- w/o = Walkover
- r = Retired
- d = Defaulted

=== Finals ===
Semifinals
1	(Greece) Stefanos Tsitsipas	6^{6}	5
6	(Italy) Matteo Berrettini	7^{8}	7
5	(Germany) Jan-Lennard Struff	3	6^{2}
Q	(France) Quentin Halys	6	7^{7}

Final
6	(Italy) Matteo Berrettini	6	6
Q	(France) Quentin Halys	3	1

=== Top half ===
First round
WC	(Switzerland) M-A Hüsler	7^{7}	6^{2}	3
(Serbia) H Medjedovic	6^{3}	7^{7}	6
(Austria) D Thiem	3	7	6^{4}
Q	(Peru) JP Varillas	6	5	7^{7}
Q	(France) T Droguet	4	3
7	(Italy) F Fognini	6	6
(Germany) Y Hanfmann	7^{7}	6^{2}	6
LL	(United States) N Moreno de Alboran	6^{2}	7^{7}	4
(Czech Republic) V Kopřiva	3	2
(Colombia) DE Galán	6	6
(Argentina) P Cachín	4	6^{2}
6	(Italy) M Berrettini	6	7^{7}

Second round
1	(Greece) S Tsitsipas	7^{8}	6
(Serbia) H Medjedovic	6^{6}	3
Q	(Peru) JP Varillas	6	6^{5}	5
7	(Italy) F Fognini	3	7^{7}	7
3	(Canada) F Auger-Aliassime	7^{8}	6
(Germany) Y Hanfmann	6^{6}	2
(Colombia) DE Galán	4	2
6	(Italy) M Berrettini	6	6

Quarterfinals
1	(Greece) S Tsitsipas	6	6
7	(Italy) F Fognini	4	3
3	(Canada) F Auger-Aliassime	6^{7}	6^{2}
6	(Italy) M Berrettini	7^{9}	7^{7}

Semifinals
1	(Greece) S Tsitsipas	6^{6}	5
6	(Italy) M Berrettini	7^{8}	7

=== Bottom half ===
First round
5	(Germany) J-L Struff	7^{8}	7^{7}
(Spain) A Ramos Viñolas	6^{6}	6^{4}
WC	(Switzerland) L Riedi	7^{7}	7
(France) G Barrère	6^{2}	5
(Netherlands) B van de Zandschulp	6	6
WC	(Switzerland) D Stricker	3	3
8	(Switzerland) S Wawrinka	6^{4}	6	5
(Slovakia) L Klein	7^{7}	2	7
Q	(France) Q Halys	7^{7}	7^{7}
(France) R Gasquet	6^{4}	6^{5}
Q	(Brazil) G Heide	7^{7}	5	7^{7}
(Italy) S Napolitano	6^{4}	7	6^{3}

Second round
5	(Germany) J-L Struff	7^{8}	7^{7}
WC	(Switzerland) L Riedi	6^{6}	6^{1}
(Netherlands) B van de Zandschulp	2	6	3
4	(Argentina) TM Etcheverry	6	2	6
(Slovakia) L Klein	3	7^{9}	4
Q	(France) Q Halys	6	6^{7}	6
Q	(Brazil) G Heide	6^{2}	6	6
2	(France) U Humbert	7^{7}	2	3

Quarterfinals
5	(Germany) J-L Struff	7	3	6
4	(Argentina) TM Etcheverry	5	6	3
Q	(France) Q Halys	6	7
Q	(Brazil) G Heide	1	5

Semifinals
5	(Germany) J-L Struff	3	6^{2}
Q	(France) Q Halys	6	7^{7}

== Qualifying ==
=== Seeds ===
1. (France) Titouan Droguet (qualified)
2. (United States) Nicolas Moreno de Alboran (qualifying competition, lucky loser)
3. (Peru) Juan Pablo Varillas (qualified)
4. (Austria) Filip Misolic (qualifying competition)
5. (Brazil) Gustavo Heide (qualified)
6. (Poland) Maks Kaśnikowski (qualifying competition)
7. (France) Quentin Halys (qualified)
8. (France) Maxime Janvier (first round)

=== Qualifiers ===
1. (France) Titouan Droguet
2. (France) Quentin Halys
3. (Peru) Juan Pablo Varillas
4. (Brazil) Gustavo Heide

=== Lucky loser ===
1. (United States) Nicolas Moreno de Alboran

=== Qualifying draw ===
==== First qualifier ====
First round
1	(France) Titouan Droguet	7^{12}	3	7^{7}
(Romania) Filip Cristian Jianu	6^{10}	6	6^{3}
(Switzerland) Rémy Bertola	3	1
6	(Poland) Maks Kaśnikowski	6	6

Qualifying competition
1	(France) Titouan Droguet	7	6
6	(Poland) Maks Kaśnikowski	5	2

==== Second qualifier ====
First round
2	(United States) Nicolas Moreno de Alboran	6	6
(Argentina) Andrea Collarini	2	2
(Italy) Giovanni Fonio	6	6^{6}	2
7	(France) Quentin Halys	1	7^{8}	6

Qualifying competition
2	(United States) Nicolas Moreno de Alboran	5	3
7	(France) Quentin Halys	7	6

==== Third qualifier ====
First round
3	(Peru) Juan Pablo Varillas	6	6
(France) Clément Tabur	4	2
WC	(Switzerland) Jérôme Kym	6	6
8	(France) Maxime Janvier	4	4

Qualifying competition
3	(Peru) Juan Pablo Varillas	7^{7}	4	6
WC	(Switzerland) Jérôme Kym	6^{4}	6	1

==== Fourth qualifier ====
First round
4	(Austria) Filip Misolic	6	3	7
Alt	(Bosnia and Herzegovina) Nerman Fatić	3	6	5
WC	(Switzerland) Mika Brunold	4	2
5	(Brazil) Gustavo Heide	6	6

Qualifying competition
4	(Austria) Filip Misolic	3	6	4
5	(Brazil) Gustavo Heide	6	3	6
