= 2023 Swiss Open Gstaad =

Tennis tournament

- Date: 17–23 July
- Edition: 55th
- Category: ATP Tour 250 Series
- Draw: 28S / 16D
- Prize money: €562,815
- Surface: Clay / outdoor
- Location: Gstaad, Switzerland
- Venue: Roy Emerson Arena

Champions

Singles
- (Argentina) Pedro Cachin

Doubles
- (Switzerland) Dominic Stricker / (Switzerland) Stan Wawrinka
- Swiss Open Gstaad

The 2023 Swiss Open Gstaad (also known as the EFG Swiss Open Gstaad for sponsorship reasons) was a men's tennis tournament played on outdoor clay courts. It was the 55th edition of the Swiss Open, and part of the ATP Tour 250 Series of the 2023 ATP Tour. It took place at the Roy Emerson Arena in Gstaad, Switzerland, from 17 July through 23 July 2023. Unseeded Pedro Cachin won the singles title.

== Finals ==
=== Singles ===
- (Argentina) Pedro Cachin defeated (Spain) Albert Ramos Viñolas, 3–6, 6–0, 7–5

=== Doubles ===
- (Switzerland) Dominic Stricker / (Switzerland) Stan Wawrinka defeated (Brazil) Marcelo Demoliner / (Netherlands) Matwé Middelkoop, 7–6^{(10–8)}, 6–2

== Points and prize money ==
=== Point distribution ===
Event	W	F	SF	QF	Round of 16	Round of 32	Q	Q2	Q1
Singles	250	150	90	45	20	0	12	6	0
Doubles	250	150	90	45	0	—N/a	—N/a	—N/a	—N/a

=== Prize money ===
Event	W	F	SF	QF	Round of 16	Round of 32	Q2	Q1
Singles	€85,605	€49,940	€29,355	€17,010	€9,880	€6,035	€3,020	€1,645
Doubles*	€29,740	€15,910	€9,330	€5,220	€3,070	—N/a	—N/a	—N/a

_{*per team}

== Singles main draw entrants ==
=== Seeds ===
Country	Player	Rank^{1}	Seed
ESP	Roberto Bautista Agut	23	1
SRB	Miomir Kecmanović	41	2
ITA	Lorenzo Sonego	42	3
GER	Yannick Hanfmann	45	4
CHN	Zhang Zhizhen	52	5
ESP	Roberto Carballés Baena	57	6
~~SWE~~	~~Mikael Ymer~~	~~59~~	~~7~~
SRB	Laslo Djere	60	8

- ^{†} Rankings are as of 3 July 2023

=== Other entrants ===
The following players received wildcards into the main draw:

- (Italy) Fabio Fognini
- (Switzerland) Alexander Ritschard
- (Switzerland) Dominic Stricker

The following players received entry from the qualifying draw:

- (Argentina) Facundo Bagnis
- (Belgium) Zizou Bergs
- (Serbia) Hamad Medjedovic
- (Austria) Jurij Rodionov

The following player received entry as a lucky loser:

- (Finland) Otto Virtanen

=== Withdrawals ===
- (Canada) Félix Auger-Aliassime → replaced by (France) Arthur Rinderknech
- (Czech Republic) Jiří Lehečka → replaced by (Spain) Jaume Munar
- (Canada) Denis Shapovalov → replaced by (Switzerland) Stan Wawrinka
- (Germany) Jan-Lennard Struff → replaced by (Austria) Dominic Thiem
- (Sweden) Mikael Ymer → replaced by (Finland) Otto Virtanen

== Doubles main draw entrants ==
=== Seeds ===
Country	Player	Country	Player	Rank^{1}	Seed
BRA	Marcelo Demoliner	NED	Matwé Middelkoop	81	1
FRA	Sadio Doumbia	FRA	Fabien Reboul	91	2
NED	Robin Haase	AUT	Philipp Oswald	99	3
MON	Romain Arneodo	AUT	Sam Weissborn	105	4

- ^{†} Rankings are as of 3 July 2023

=== Other entrants ===
The following pairs received wildcards into the doubles main draw:

- (Switzerland) Mika Brunold / (Switzerland) Kilian Feldbausch
- (Switzerland) Dominic Stricker / (Switzerland) Stan Wawrinka

The following pair received entry as alternates:

- (Belgium) Zizou Bergs / (Austria) Jurij Rodionov

=== Withdrawals ===
- (India) Sriram Balaji / (India) Jeevan Nedunchezhiyan → replaced by (India) Sriram Balaji / (China) Zhang Zhizhen
- (Spain) Roberto Carballés Baena / (Venezuela) Luis David Martínez → replaced by (Belgium) Zizou Bergs / (Austria) Jurij Rodionov
- (United Kingdom) Jamie Murray / (New Zealand) Michael Venus → replaced by (Bolivia) Boris Arias / (Bolivia) Federico Zeballos
- (Greece) Petros Tsitsipas / (Netherlands) Sem Verbeek → replaced by (France) Arthur Rinderknech / (Netherlands) Sem Verbeek
