= 2021 Swiss Open Gstaad – Doubles =

Doubles
- 2021 Swiss Open Gstaad

Final
- Champions: (Switzerland) Marc-Andrea Hüsler (Switzerland) Dominic Stricker
- Runners-up: (Poland) Szymon Walków (Poland) Jan Zieliński
- Score: 6–1, 7–6^{(9–7)}

Events
Singles	Doubles
- Swiss Open Gstaad

Sander Gillé and Joran Vliegen were the reigning champions from when the tournament was last held in 2019, but chose not to participate this year.

Marc-Andrea Hüsler and Dominic Stricker won the title, defeating Szymon Walków and Jan Zieliński in the final, 6–1, 7–6^{(9–7)}.

== Seeds ==
1. (Netherlands) Robin Haase / (Netherlands) Matwé Middelkoop (first round)
2. (Uruguay) Ariel Behar / (Ecuador) Gonzalo Escobar (first round)
3. (Monaco) Hugo Nys / (Italy) Andrea Vavassori (first round)
4. (Sweden) André Göransson / (Denmark) Frederik Nielsen (first round)

== Draw ==
Key

- Q = Qualifier
- WC = Wild card
- LL = Lucky loser
- Alt = Alternate
- ITF = ITF entry
- PR = Protected ranking
- SR = Special ranking
- SE = Special exempt
- JE = Junior exempt
- JR = Junior Accelerator Programme entrant
- CO = College Accelerator Programme entrant
- NG = Next Gen Accelerator Program entrant
- w/o = Walkover
- r = Retired
- d = Defaulted

=== Draw ===
First round
1	(Netherlands) R Haase (Netherlands) M Middelkoop	3	4
(France) B Paire (France) A Rinderknech	6	6
(Ukraine) D Molchanov (Kazakhstan) A Nedovyesov	7	5	[7]
(United States) R Galloway (United States) A Lawson	5	7	[10]
3	(Monaco) H Nys (Italy) A Vavassori	6	3	[4]
(Argentina) F Delbonis (Argentina) G Durán	3	6	[10]
(Monaco) R Arneodo (France) A Olivetti	4	4
WC	(Switzerland) M-A Hüsler (Switzerland) D Stricker	6	6
WC	(Switzerland) J Paul (Switzerland) L Riedi	6	6
(United States) E King (United States) M Schnur	3	4
Alt	(Belgium) Z Bergs (Netherlands) T Griekspoor	6	6
4	(Sweden) A Göransson (Denmark) F Nielsen	3	4
(Poland) S Walków (Poland) J Zieliński	7^{7}	0
(Netherlands) S Arends (Netherlands) D Pel	6^{4}	0^{r}
(Germany) D Brown (Austria) T-S Weissborn	6	3	[10]
2	(Uruguay) A Behar (Ecuador) G Escobar	4	6	[7]

Quarterfinals
(France) B Paire (France) A Rinderknech	7	6
(United States) R Galloway (United States) A Lawson	5	4
(Argentina) F Delbonis (Argentina) G Durán	1	4
WC	(Switzerland) M-A Hüsler (Switzerland) D Stricker	6	6
WC	(Switzerland) J Paul (Switzerland) L Riedi	w/o
Alt	(Belgium) Z Bergs (Netherlands) T Griekspoor
(Poland) S Walków (Poland) J Zieliński	6	6^{7}	[10]
(Germany) D Brown (Austria) T-S Weissborn	4	7^{9}	[7]

Semifinals
(France) B Paire (France) A Rinderknech	4	6	[12]
WC	(Switzerland) M-A Hüsler (Switzerland) D Stricker	6	4	[14]
WC	(Switzerland) J Paul (Switzerland) L Riedi	6	6^{3}	[2]
(Poland) S Walków (Poland) J Zieliński	4	7^{7}	[10]

Final
WC	(Switzerland) M-A Hüsler (Switzerland) D Stricker	6	7^{9}
(Poland) S Walków (Poland) J Zieliński	1	6^{7}
