= 2024 Swiss Open Gstaad – Doubles =

Doubles
- 2024 Swiss Open Gstaad

Final
- Champion: (India) Yuki Bhambri (France) Albano Olivetti
- Runner-up: (France) Ugo Humbert (France) Fabrice Martin
- Score: 3–6, 6–3, [10–6]

Events
Singles	Doubles
- Swiss Open Gstaad

Yuki Bhambri and Albano Olivetti won the doubles title at the 2024 Swiss Open Gstaad, defeating Ugo Humbert and Fabrice Martin in the final, 3–6, 6–3, [10–6]. It was the third ATP Tour doubles title for Bhambri, and second for Olivetti.

Dominic Stricker and Stan Wawrinka were the reigning champions, but Wawrinka chose not to participate. Stricker partnered Félix Auger-Aliassime, but lost in the first round to Jamie Murray and Adam Pavlásek.

== Seeds ==
1. (United Kingdom) Jamie Murray / (Czech Republic) Adam Pavlásek (quarterfinals)
2. (Mexico) Santiago González / (Tunisia) Skander Mansouri (quarterfinals)
3. (India) Yuki Bhambri / (France) Albano Olivetti (champions)
4. (Colombia) Nicolás Barrientos / (United Kingdom) Luke Johnson (first round)
5. (Netherlands) Sander Arends / (Netherlands) Robin Haase (semifinals)
6. (Monaco) Romain Arneodo / (Austria) Sam Weissborn (first round)
7. (Netherlands) Matwe Middelkoop / (Ukraine) Denys Molchanov (quarterfinals)
8. (Germany) Andre Begemann / (Romania) Victor Vlad Cornea (semifinals)

== Draw ==
Key

- Q = Qualifier
- WC = Wild card
- LL = Lucky loser
- Alt = Alternate
- ITF = ITF entry
- PR = Protected ranking
- SR = Special ranking
- SE = Special exempt
- JE = Junior exempt
- JR = Junior Accelerator Programme entrant
- CO = College Accelerator Programme entrant
- NG = Next Gen Accelerator Program entrant
- w/o = Walkover
- r = Retired
- d = Defaulted

=== Draw ===
First round
1	(United Kingdom) J Murray (Czech Republic) A Pavlásek	6	7^{7}
WC	(Canada) F Auger-Aliassime (Switzerland) D Stricker	4	6^{4}
(France) U Humbert (France) F Martin	6	6
6	(Monaco) R Arneodo (Austria) S Weissborn	1	4
4	(Colombia) N Barrientos (United Kingdom) L Johnson	6	4	[12]
(Greece) Pe Tsitsipas (Greece) S Tsitsipas	3	6	[14]
(Italy) M Bortolotti (Australia) M Romios	6	6^{5}	[8]
8	(Germany) A Begemann (Romania) VV Cornea	4	7^{7}	[10]
7	(Netherlands) M Middelkoop (Ukraine) D Molchanov	6	6
(Venezuela) LD Martínez (Colombia) C Rodríguez	2	4
(Bolivia) B Arias (Bolivia) F Zeballos	4	4
3	(India) Y Bhambri (France) A Olivetti	6	6
5	(Netherlands) S Arends (Netherlands) R Haase	3	6	[14]
WC	(Switzerland) M-A Hüsler (Switzerland) L Riedi	6	3	[12]
(Argentina) P Cachín (Argentina) TM Etcheverry	7	3	[4]
2	(Mexico) S González (Tunisia) S Mansouri	5	6	[10]

Quarterfinals
1	(United Kingdom) J Murray (Czech Republic) A Pavlásek	6^{3}	2
(France) U Humbert (France) F Martin	7^{7}	6
(Greece) Pe Tsitsipas (Greece) S Tsitsipas	6^{3}	6	[9]
8	(Germany) A Begemann (Romania) VV Cornea	7^{7}	3	[11]
7	(Netherlands) M Middelkoop (Ukraine) D Molchanov	3	4
3	(India) Y Bhambri (France) A Olivetti	6	6
5	(Netherlands) S Arends (Netherlands) R Haase	3	6	[10]
2	(Mexico) S González (Tunisia) S Mansouri	6	3	[2]

Semifinals
(France) U Humbert (France) F Martin	7^{7}	6
8	(Germany) A Begemann (Romania) VV Cornea	6^{3}	3
3	(India) Y Bhambri (France) A Olivetti	6	7^{7}
5	(Netherlands) S Arends (Netherlands) R Haase	3	6^{4}

Final
(France) U Humbert (France) F Martin	6	3	[6]
3	(India) Y Bhambri (France) A Olivetti	3	6	[10]
