= 2019 Swiss Open Gstaad – Singles =

Singles
- 2019 Swiss Open Gstaad

Final
- Champion: (Spain) Albert Ramos Viñolas
- Runner-up: (Germany) Cedrik-Marcel Stebe
- Score: 6–3, 6–2

Events
Singles	Doubles
- Swiss Open Gstaad

Matteo Berrettini was the defending champion, but withdrew with an ankle injury before the tournament began.

Albert Ramos Viñolas won the title, defeating Cedrik-Marcel Stebe in the final, 6–3, 6–2.

== Seeds ==
The top four seeds received a bye into the second round.

1. (Spain) Roberto Bautista Agut (quarterfinals)
2. (Spain) Fernando Verdasco (second round)
3. (Serbia) Dušan Lajović (quarterfinals)
4. (Italy) Lorenzo Sonego (second round)
5. (Portugal) João Sousa (semifinals)
6. (Spain) Roberto Carballés Baena (quarterfinals)
7. (Spain) Pablo Andújar (semifinals)
8. (France) Corentin Moutet (first round)

== Draw ==
Key

- Q = Qualifier
- WC = Wild card
- LL = Lucky loser
- Alt = Alternate
- ITF = ITF entry
- PR = Protected ranking
- SR = Special ranking
- SE = Special exempt
- JE = Junior exempt
- JR = Junior Accelerator Programme entrant
- CO = College Accelerator Programme entrant
- NG = Next Gen Accelerator Program entrant
- w/o = Walkover
- r = Retired
- d = Defaulted

=== Finals ===
Semifinals
5	(Portugal) João Sousa	6	1	2
PR	(Germany) Cedrik-Marcel Stebe	3	6	6
7	(Spain) Pablo Andújar	6^{3}	4
(Spain) Albert Ramos Viñolas	7^{7}	6

Final
PR	(Germany) Cedrik-Marcel Stebe	3	2
(Spain) Albert Ramos Viñolas	6	6

=== Top half ===
First round
(Spain) J Munar	5	6	6
(Tunisia) M Jaziri	7	3	4
Q	(Italy) GM Moroni	6	6
WC	(Spain) T Robredo	2	2
PR	(Belgium) S Darcis	4	4
5	(Portugal) J Sousa	6	6
(Italy) T Fabbiano	6	7
WC	(Switzerland) S Ehrat	4	5
(Czech Republic) J Veselý	7	7
(Latvia) E Gulbis	5	5
PR	(Germany) C-M Stebe	6	6
8	(France) C Moutet	4	4

Second round
1	(Spain) R Bautista Agut	7^{9}	6
(Spain) J Munar	6^{7}	4
Q	(Italy) GM Moroni	4	4
5	(Portugal) J Sousa	6	6
4	(Italy) L Sonego	6^{2}	6	1
(Italy) T Fabbiano	7^{7}	3	6
(Czech Republic) J Veselý	6^{3}	6	3
PR	(Germany) C-M Stebe	7^{7}	4	6

Quarterfinals
1	(Spain) R Bautista Agut	6	3	5
5	(Portugal) J Sousa	4	6	7
(Italy) T Fabbiano	4	6	4
PR	(Germany) C-M Stebe	6	2	6

Semifinals
5	(Portugal) J Sousa	6	1	2
PR	(Germany) C-M Stebe	3	6	6

=== Bottom half ===
First round
7	(Spain) P Andújar	6	3	6
Q	(Austria) D Novak	1	6	3
Q	(Italy) F Baldi	4	4
(Japan) T Daniel	6	6
(Uzbekistan) D Istomin	6	7^{7}
WC	(Switzerland) M-A Hüsler	3	6^{0}
6	(Spain) R Carballés Baena	6^{1}	6	6
(Italy) P Lorenzi	7^{7}	3	2
Q	(Colombia) DE Galán	6^{7}	3
(Italy) S Travaglia	7^{9}	6
(Switzerland) H Laaksonen	0	3
(Spain) A Ramos Viñolas	6	6

Second round
7	(Spain) P Andújar	6	3	7^{7}
(Japan) T Daniel	1	6	6^{2}
(Uzbekistan) D Istomin	4	7^{7}	6^{2}
3	(Serbia) D Lajović	6	6^{2}	7^{7}
6	(Spain) R Carballés Baena	6	6
(Italy) S Travaglia	2	4
(Spain) A Ramos Viñolas	6	7^{7}
2	(Spain) F Verdasco	4	6^{4}

Quarterfinals
7	(Spain) P Andújar	7^{7}	6
3	(Serbia) D Lajović	6^{4}	4
6	(Spain) R Carballés Baena	2	1
(Spain) A Ramos Viñolas	6	6

Semifinals
7	(Spain) P Andújar	6^{3}	4
(Spain) A Ramos Viñolas	7^{7}	6

== Qualifying ==
=== Seeds ===
1. (Japan) Taro Daniel (moved to main draw)
2. (Austria) Dennis Novak (qualified)
3. (Italy) Filippo Baldi (qualified)
4. (Argentina) Marco Trungelliti (qualifying competition)
5. (Spain) Guillermo García López (qualifying competition)
6. (Colombia) Daniel Elahi Galán (qualified)
7. (Italy) Stefano Napolitano (first round)
8. (Argentina) Facundo Argüello (withdrew)

=== Qualifiers ===
1. (Colombia) Daniel Elahi Galán
2. (Austria) Dennis Novak
3. (Italy) Filippo Baldi
4. (Italy) Gian Marco Moroni

=== Qualifying draw ===
==== First qualifier ====
First round				Qualifying competition
				Alt	(Switzerland) Jakub Paul	1	6	6^{7}
				6	(Colombia) Daniel Elahi Galán	6	2	7^{9}
	(France) Elliot Benchetrit	2	5	6	(Colombia) Daniel Elahi Galán	6	2	7^{9}
6	(Colombia) Daniel Elahi Galán	6	7

==== Second qualifier ====
First round
2	(Austria) Dennis Novak	6	6
(France) Stéphane Robert	3	2
(Croatia) Viktor Galović	6	6
7	(Italy) Stefano Napolitano	3	4

Qualifying competition
2	(Austria) Dennis Novak	6	6
(Croatia) Viktor Galović	3	3

==== Third qualifier ====
First round
3	(Italy) Filippo Baldi	7	6
WC	(Switzerland) Johan Nikles	5	3
Alt	(Ecuador) Gonzalo Escobar	1	2
5	(Spain) Guillermo García López	6	6

Qualifying competition
3	(Italy) Filippo Baldi	4	7^{7}	6
5	(Spain) Guillermo García López	6	6^{5}	2

==== Fourth qualifier ====
First round
4	(Argentina) Marco Trungelliti	4	6	7
WC	(Switzerland) Raphael Baltensperger	6	3	5
(Italy) Gian Marco Moroni	6	6
Alt	(Switzerland) Luca Margaroli	3	4

Qualifying competition
4	(Argentina) Marco Trungelliti	3	2
(Italy) Gian Marco Moroni	6	6
