= 2026 Swiss Open Gstaad =

Tennis tournament

- Date: 13–19 July
- Edition: 58th
- Category: ATP 250
- Draw: 28S / 16D
- Surface: Clay / outdoor
- Location: Gstaad, Switzerland
- Venue: Roy Emerson Arena

Champions

Singles
- (Greece) Stefanos Tsitsipas

Doubles
- (Austria) Lucas Miedler / (Australia) Marc Polmans
- Swiss Open Gstaad

The 2026 Swiss Open Gstaad (also known as the EFG Swiss Open Gstaad for sponsorship reasons) was a men's tennis tournament played on outdoor clay courts. It was the 58th edition of the Swiss Open, and part of the ATP 250 tournaments of the 2026 ATP Tour. It took place at the Roy Emerson Arena in Gstaad, Switzerland, from 13 through 19 July 2026.

== Champions ==
=== Singles ===
- (Greece) Stefanos Tsitsipas def. (Belgium) Raphaël Collignon, 6–4, 6–7^{(3–7)}, 6–3

=== Doubles ===
- (Austria) Lucas Miedler / (Australia) Marc Polmans def. (Brazil) Marcelo Demoliner / (United States) Robert Galloway, 6–3, 6–4

== Singles main draw entrants ==
=== Seeds ===
Country	Player	Rank^{1}	Seed
KAZ	Alexander Bublik	11	1
NOR	Casper Ruud	12	2
MON	Valentin Vacherot	20	3
FRA	Arthur Rinderknech	28	4
PER	Ignacio Buse	34	5
ARG	Juan Manuel Cerúndolo	42	6
BEL	Raphaël Collignon	43	7
ESP	Jaume Munar	44	8

- ^{†} Rankings are as of 29 June 2026

=== Other entrants ===
The following players received wildcards into the main draw:

- (Switzerland) Kilian Feldbausch
- (Switzerland) Jérôme Kym
- (Switzerland) Dominic Stricker

The following players received entry through the Next Gen Accelerator program:

- (Italy) Federico Cinà
- (Austria) Joel Schwärzler

The following players received entry from the qualifying draw:

- (Italy) Federico Cinà
- (Switzerland) Dylan Dietrich
- (Kazakhstan) Timofey Skatov
- (France) Clément Tabur

=== Withdrawals ===
- (Italy) Mattia Bellucci → replaced by (France) Quentin Halys
- (Italy) Matteo Berrettini → replaced by (Portugal) Jaime Faria
- (France) Benjamin Bonzi → replaced by (France) Alexandre Müller
- (Argentina) Francisco Comesaña → replaced by (Switzerland) Stan Wawrinka
- (Germany) Jan-Lennard Struff → replaced by (Kazakhstan) Alexander Shevchenko

== Doubles main draw entrants ==
=== Seeds ===
Country	Player	Country	Player	Rank	Seed
AUT	Lucas Miedler	AUS	Marc Polmans	60	1
GER	Jakob Schnaitter	GER	Mark Wallner	74	2
FRA	Quentin Halys	FRA	Pierre-Hugues Herbert	87	3
CZE	Petr Nouza	AUT	Neil Oberleitner	88	4

- Rankings are as of 29 June 2026.

=== Other entrants ===
The following pairs received wildcards into the doubles main draw:

- (Switzerland) Dylan Dietrich / (Switzerland) Dominic Stricker
- (Switzerland) Jérôme Kym / (Switzerland) Stan Wawrinka
