= 2009 Allianz Suisse Open Gstaad =

- Date: 26 July – 2 August
- Edition: 42nd
- Category: World Tour 250 series
- Draw: 28S / 16D
- Prize money: €398,250
- Location: Gstaad, Switzerland
- Venue: Roy Emerson Arena

Champions

Singles
- (Brazil) Thomaz Bellucci

Doubles
- (Switzerland) Marco Chiudinelli / (Switzerland) Michael Lammer
- Swiss Open

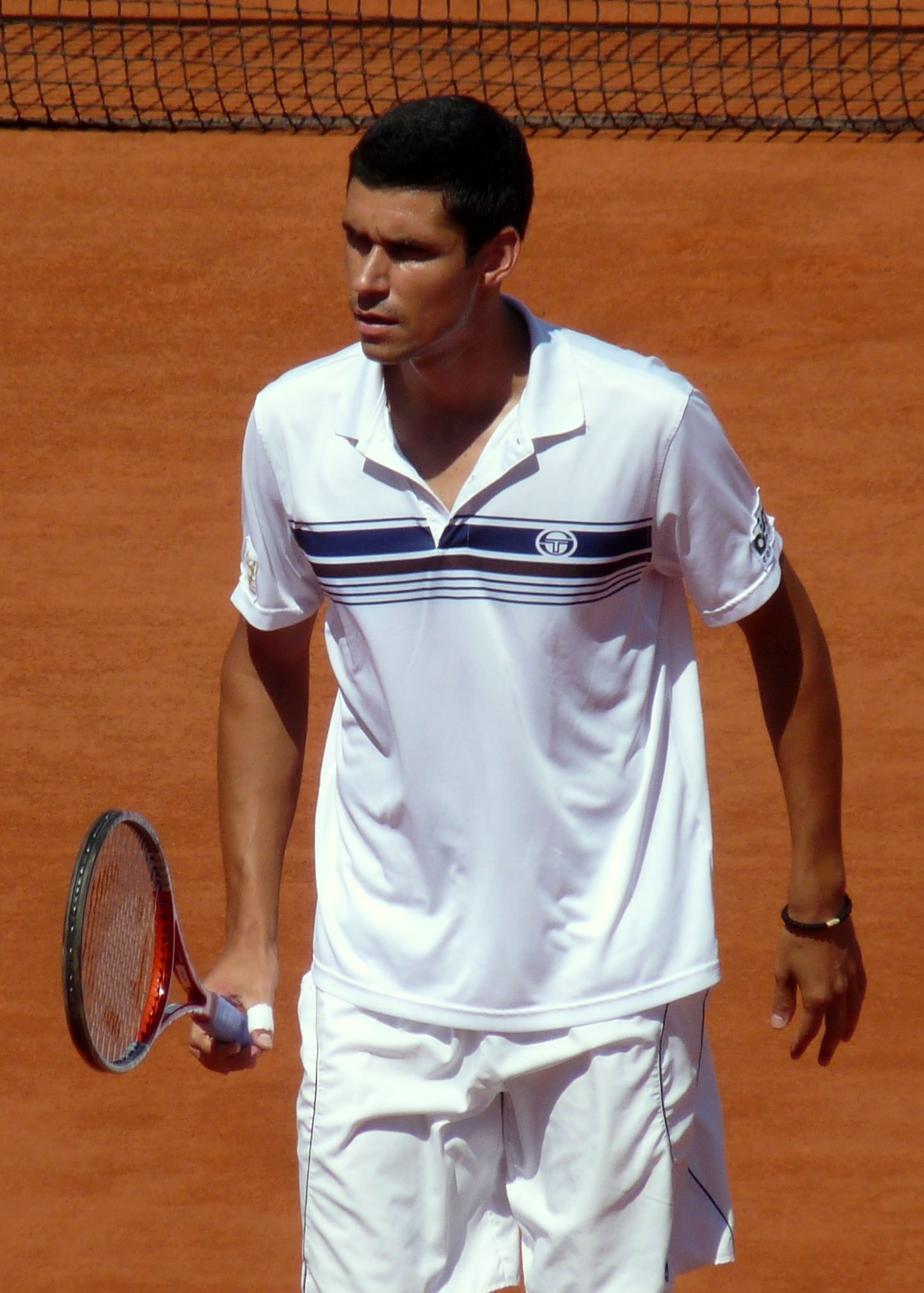
Stuttgart runner-up Victor Hănescu will defend his Gstaad title.

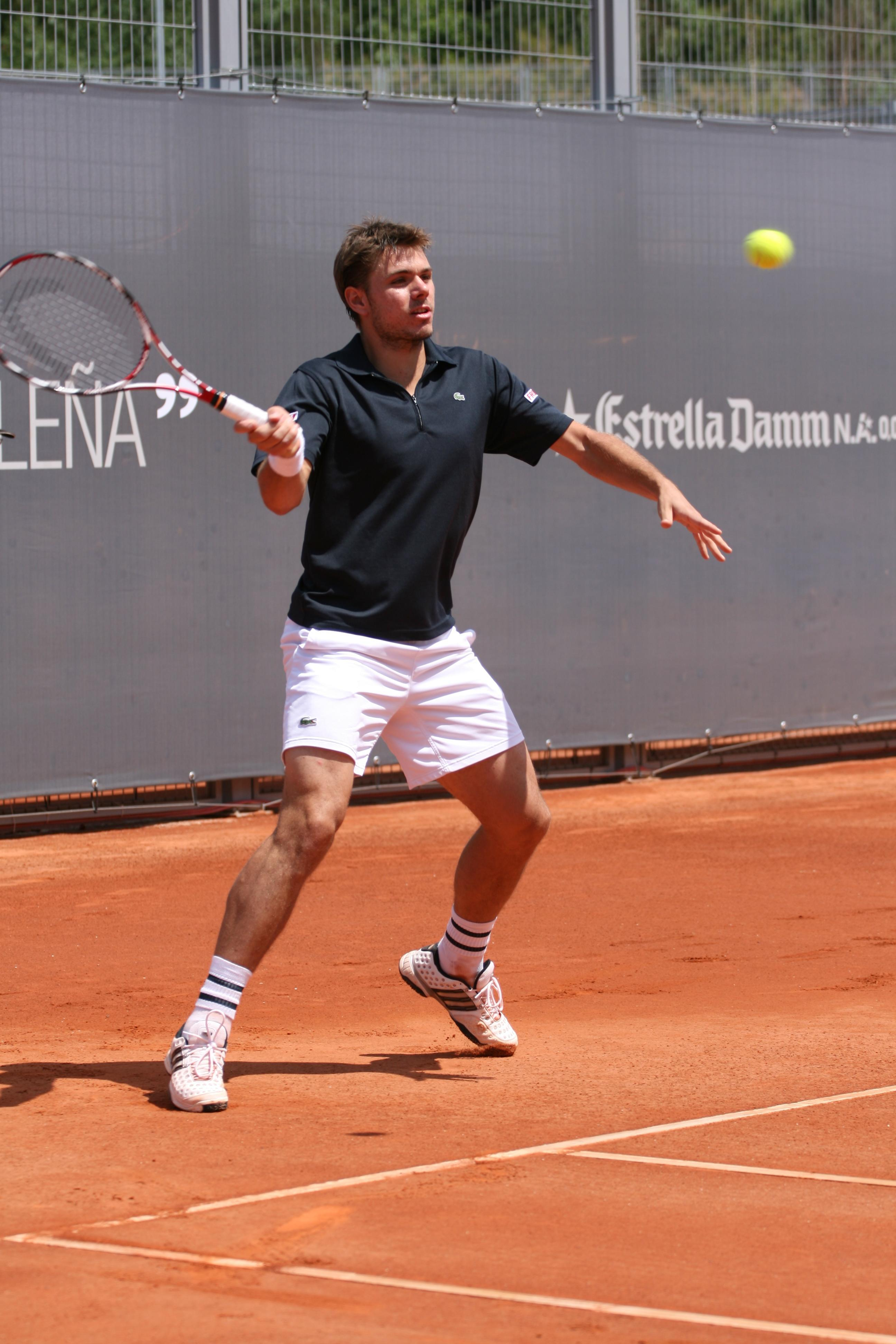
Stanislas Wawrinka will headline the singles field in Gstaad.

The 2009 Allianz Suisse Open Gstaad was a men's tennis tournament played on outdoor red clay courts. It was the 42nd edition of the event known that year as the Allianz Suisse Open Gstaad and was part of the ATP World Tour 250 series of the 2009 ATP World Tour. It took place at the Roy Emerson Arena in Gstaad, Switzerland, from 26 July through 2 August 2009. Unseeded Thomaz Bellucci won the singles title.

== Finals ==
=== Singles ===
(Brazil) Thomaz Bellucci defeated (Germany) Andreas Beck, 6–4, 7–6^{(7–2)}

- It was Bellucci's only singles title of the year and the 1st of his career.

=== Doubles ===
(Switzerland) Marco Chiudinelli / (Switzerland) Michael Lammer defeated (Czech Republic) Jaroslav Levinský / (Slovakia) Filip Polášek, 7–5, 6–3

== ATP entrants ==
=== Seeds ===
Country	Player	Rank*	Seed
SUI	Stanislas Wawrinka	18	1
GER	Philipp Kohlschreiber	24	2
RUS	Igor Andreev	28	3
ROU	Victor Hănescu	31	4
FRA	Jérémy Chardy	32	5
GER	Nicolas Kiefer	34	6
ESP	Feliciano López	38	7
FRA	Paul-Henri Mathieu	38	8

- as of July 20, 2009

=== Other entrants ===
The following players received wildcards into the singles main draw

- (Argentina) Gastón Gaudio
- (Switzerland) Stéphane Bohli
- (Switzerland) Marco Chiudinelli

The following players received entry from the qualifying draw:

- (Brazil) Thomaz Bellucci
- (Argentina) Federico del Bonis
- (Uzbekistan) Farrukh Dustov
- (France) Thierry Ascione

== Notes ==
- ^{a} Players' rankings, as of Monday, July 20, 2009.
- ^{b} Projected seeding based on the Monday, July 20, 2009 rankings.
