= 2013 Swiss Indoors =

- Date: 21–27 October
- Edition: 44th
- Category: ATP World Tour 500
- Draw: 32S / 16D
- Prize money: €1,445,835
- Surface: Hard
- Location: Basel, Switzerland
- Venue: St. Jakobshalle

Champions

Singles
- (Argentina) Juan Martín del Potro

Doubles
- (Philippines) Treat Huey / (United Kingdom) Dominic Inglot
← 2012 ·	Swiss Indoors	· 2014 →

The 2013 Swiss Indoors was a men's tennis tournament played on indoor hard courts. It was the 44th edition of the event known as the Swiss Indoors, and part of the 500 series of the 2013 ATP World Tour. It was held at the St. Jakobshalle in Basel, Switzerland, from 21 October through 27 October 2013. First-seeded Juan Martín del Potro won the singles title.

== Finals ==
=== Singles ===
- (Argentina) Juan Martín del Potro defeated (Switzerland) Roger Federer, 7–6^{(7–3)}, 2–6, 6–4

=== Doubles ===
- (Philippines) Treat Huey / (United Kingdom) Dominic Inglot defeated (Austria) Julian Knowle / (Austria) Oliver Marach, 6–3, 3–6, [10–4]

== Points and prize money ==
=== Point distribution ===
Event	W	F	SF	QF	Round of 16	Round of 32	Q	Q2	Q1
Singles	500	300	180	90	45	0	20	10	0
Doubles	500	300	180	90	0	—	—	—	—

=== Prize money ===
Event	W	F	SF	QF	Round of 16	Round of 32	Q2	Q1
Singles	€348,000	€156,800	€74,300	€35,850	€18,275	€10,275	€1,130	€625
Doubles	€102,780	€46,370	€21,860	€10,570	€5,430	—	—	—

== Singles main-draw entrants ==
=== Seeds ===
Country	Player	Rank^{1}	Seed
ARG	Juan Martín del Potro	5	1
CZE	Tomáš Berdych	6	2
SUI	Roger Federer	7	3
SUI	Stanislas Wawrinka	9	4
FRA	Richard Gasquet	10	5
JPN	Kei Nishikori	18	6
ITA	Andreas Seppi	22	7
BUL	Grigor Dimitrov	28	8

- Rankings are as of October 14, 2013

=== Other entrants ===
The following players received wildcards into the singles main draw:

- (Switzerland) Marco Chiudinelli
- (Ukraine) Alexandr Dolgopolov
- (Switzerland) Henri Laaksonen

The following players received entry from the qualifying draw:

- (Germany) Benjamin Becker
- (Germany) Tobias Kamke
- (United States) Denis Kudla
- (France) Paul-Henri Mathieu

=== Withdrawals ===
- (United States) Brian Baker
- (Russia) Nikolay Davydenko
- (Argentina) Federico Delbonis (personal reasons)
- (Australia) Marinko Matosevic
- (Spain) Rafael Nadal (fatigue)
- (Canada) Milos Raonic (personal reasons)

=== Retirements ===
- (Argentina) Carlos Berlocq (right foot pain)

== Doubles main-draw entrants ==
=== Seeds ===
Country	Player	Country	Player	Rank^{1}	Seed
IND	Rohan Bopanna	FRA	Édouard Roger-Vasselin	27	1
PAK	Aisam-ul-Haq Qureshi	NED	Jean-Julien Rojer	30	2
POL	Mariusz Fyrstenberg	POL	Marcin Matkowski	41	3
BLR	Max Mirnyi	ROU	Horia Tecău	52	4

- Rankings are as of October 14, 2013

=== Other entrants ===
The following pairs received wildcards into the doubles main draw:

- (Switzerland) Marco Chiudinelli / (Switzerland) Michael Lammer
- (Switzerland) Sandro Ehrat / (Switzerland) Henri Laaksonen
