= 2008 Allianz Suisse Open Gstaad – Doubles =

Doubles
- 2008 Allianz Suisse Open Gstaad

Final
- Champions: (Czech Republic) Jaroslav Levinský (Slovakia) Filip Polášek
- Runners-up: (Switzerland) Stéphane Bohli (Switzerland) Stan Wawrinka
- Score: 3–6, 6–2, [11–9]

Details
- Draw: 16
- Seeds: 4

Events
Singles	Doubles
- Swiss Open

František Čermák and Pavel Vízner were the defending champions, but lost in the semifinals to Stéphane Bohli and Stan Wawrinka.

Jaroslav Levinský and Filip Polášek won in the final 3–6, 6–2, [11–9], against Stéphane Bohli and Stan Wawrinka.

== Seeds ==
1. (Czech Republic) František Čermák / (Czech Republic) Pavel Vízner (semifinals)
2. (Argentina) Martín García / (Peru) Luis Horna (first round)
3. (Czech Republic) David Škoch / (Croatia) Lovro Zovko (first round)
4. (Czech Republic) Jaroslav Levinský / (Slovakia) Filip Polášek (champions)

== Draw ==
Key

- Q = Qualifier
- WC = Wild card
- LL = Lucky loser
- Alt = Alternate
- ITF = ITF entry
- PR = Protected ranking
- SR = Special ranking
- SE = Special exempt
- JE = Junior exempt
- JR = Junior Accelerator Programme entrant
- CO = College Accelerator Programme entrant
- NG = Next Gen Accelerator Program entrant
- w/o = Walkover
- r = Retired
- d = Defaulted

=== Draw ===
First round
1	(Czech Republic) F Čermák (Czech Republic) P Vízner	6	7
(Romania) V Hănescu (Romania) F Mergea	3	5
(Czech Republic) P Pála (Russia) M Youzhny	6^{3}	6	[10]
(Czech Republic) T Cibulec (Czech Republic) I Minář	7^{7}	2	[6]
3	(Czech Republic) D Škoch (Croatia) L Zovko	6^{2}	6	[8]
WC	(Austria) P Oswald (Switzerland) J-C Scherrer	7^{7}	4	[10]
(Italy) F Cipolla (Czech Republic) J Vaněk	5	3
(Switzerland) S Bohli (Switzerland) S Wawrinka	7	6
(Brazil) M Daniel (Brazil) B Soares	2	4
(Switzerland) Y Allegro (Romania) H Tecău	6	6
WC	(Switzerland) M Lammer (Switzerland) A Sadecky	7	4	[5]
4	(Czech Republic) J Levinský (Slovakia) F Polášek	5	6	[10]
(Croatia) M Čilić (Germany) N Kiefer	5	6	[10]
(Spain) G García López (Spain) D Gimeno-Traver	7	0	[8]
(Italy) A Seppi (Italy) S Vagnozzi	2	6	[10]
2	(Argentina) M García (Peru) L Horna	6	3	[8]

Quarterfinals
1	(Czech Republic) F Čermák (Czech Republic) P Vízner	7^{7}	7
(Czech Republic) P Pála (Russia) M Youzhny	6^{5}	5
WC	(Austria) P Oswald (Switzerland) J-C Scherrer	4	7^{7}	[15]
(Switzerland) S Bohli (Switzerland) S Wawrinka	6	6^{3}	[17]
(Switzerland) Y Allegro (Romania) H Tecău	7^{8}	6^{3}	[7]
4	(Czech Republic) J Levinský (Slovakia) F Polášek	6^{6}	7^{7}	[10]
(Croatia) M Čilić (Germany) N Kiefer
(Italy) A Seppi (Italy) S Vagnozzi	w/o

Semifinals
1	(Czech Republic) F Čermák (Czech Republic) P Vízner	3	2
(Switzerland) S Bohli (Switzerland) S Wawrinka	6	6
4	(Czech Republic) J Levinský (Slovakia) F Polášek	7	6
(Italy) A Seppi (Italy) S Vagnozzi	5	2

Final
(Switzerland) S Bohli (Switzerland) S Wawrinka	6	2	[9]
4	(Czech Republic) J Levinský (Slovakia) F Polášek	3	6	[11]
