= 2013 Swiss Indoors – Doubles =

Doubles
- 2013 Swiss Indoors

Final
- Champions: (Philippines) Treat Huey (United Kingdom) Dominic Inglot
- Runners-up: (Austria) Julian Knowle (Austria) Oliver Marach
- Score: 6–3, 3–6, [10–4]

Details
- Draw: 16
- Seeds: 4

Events
| Singles | Doubles |
| ← 2012 · | Swiss Indoors | · 2014 → |

Daniel Nestor and Nenad Zimonjić were the defending champions, but Zimonjić decided to compete in Valencia instead. Nestor played alongside Vasek Pospisil, but lost in the first round to Denis Istomin and Horacio Zeballos.
Treat Huey and Dominic Inglot won the title, defeating Julian Knowle and Oliver Marach in the final, 6–3, 3–6, [10–4].

== Seeds ==
1. (India) Rohan Bopanna / (France) Édouard Roger-Vasselin (quarterfinals)
2. (Pakistan) Aisam-ul-Haq Qureshi / (Netherlands) Jean-Julien Rojer (first round)
3. (Poland) Mariusz Fyrstenberg / (Poland) Marcin Matkowski (semifinals)
4. (Belarus) Max Mirnyi / (Romania) Horia Tecău (first round)

== Draw ==
=== Key ===
- Q = Qualifier
- WC = Wild card
- LL = Lucky loser
- Alt = Alternate
- SE = Special exempt
- PR = Protected ranking
- ITF = ITF entry
- JE = Junior exempt
- w/o = Walkover
- r = Retired
- d = Defaulted
- SR = Special ranking

=== Draw ===
First round
1 | (India) R Bopanna (France) É Roger-Vasselin | 5 | 6 | [10]
(Poland) Ł Kubot (Italy) A Seppi | 7 | 3 | [7]
(United Kingdom) C Fleming (United Kingdom) J Marray | 2 | 6^{1}
(Austria) J Knowle (Austria) O Marach | 6 | 7^{7}
3 | (Poland) M Fyrstenberg (Poland) M Matkowski | 6 | 1 | [17]
WC | (Switzerland) M Chiudinelli (Switzerland) M Lammer | 3 | 6 | [15]
(Czech Republic) L Dlouhý (Australia) P Hanley | 6 | 7^{8}
WC | (Switzerland) S Ehrat (Switzerland) H Laaksonen | 3 | 6^{6}
(France) M Llodra (France) N Mahut | 6 | 6
(Colombia) JS Cabal (Colombia) R Farah | 1 | 3
(Germany) A Begemann (Germany) M Emmrich | 6 | 6
4 | (Belarus) M Mirnyi (Romania) H Tecău | 3 | 4
(Canada) D Nestor (Canada) V Pospisil | 2 | 6^{4}
(Uzbekistan) D Istomin (Argentina) H Zeballos | 6 | 7^{7}
(Philippines) T Huey (United Kingdom) D Inglot | 3 | 7^{7} | [10]
2 | (Pakistan) A-u-H Qureshi (Netherlands) J-J Rojer | 6 | 6^{4} | [8]

Quarterfinals
1 | (India) R Bopanna (France) É Roger-Vasselin | 4 | 4
(Austria) J Knowle (Austria) O Marach | 6 | 6
3 | (Poland) M Fyrstenberg (Poland) M Matkowski | 6 | 6
(Czech Republic) L Dlouhý (Australia) P Hanley | 3 | 2
(France) M Llodra (France) N Mahut | 6 | 7^{7}
(Germany) A Begemann (Germany) M Emmrich | 3 | 6^{5}
(Uzbekistan) D Istomin (Argentina) H Zeballos | 4 | 6^{5}
(Philippines) T Huey (United Kingdom) D Inglot | 6 | 7^{7}

Semifinals
(Austria) J Knowle (Austria) O Marach | 6 | 7^{7}
3 | (Poland) M Fyrstenberg (Poland) M Matkowski | 4 | 6^{4}
(France) M Llodra (France) N Mahut | 6^{3} | 6^{2}
(Philippines) T Huey (United Kingdom) D Inglot | 7^{7} | 7^{7}

Final
(Austria) J Knowle (Austria) O Marach | 3 | 6 | [4]
(Philippines) T Huey (United Kingdom) D Inglot | 6 | 3 | [10]
