= 2006 Allianz Suisse Open Gstaad =

- Date: 10–16 July
- Edition: 61st
- Category: International Series
- Draw: 32S / 16D
- Prize money: $470,000
- Surface: Clay / outdoor
- Location: Gstaad, Switzerland
- Venue: Roy Emerson Arena

Champions

Singles
- (France) Richard Gasquet

Doubles
- (Czech Republic) Jiří Novák / (Romania) Andrei Pavel
- Swiss Open

The 2006 Allianz Suisse Open Gstaad was the 2006 edition of the Allianz Suisse Open Gstaad men's tennis tournament. It was the 61st edition of the tournament and was held from 10 July until 16 July 2006. Seventh-seeded Richard Gasquet won his second title of the year.

== Finals ==
=== Singles ===
(France) Richard Gasquet defeated (Spain) Feliciano López, 7–6^{(7–4)}, 6–7^{(3–7)}, 6–3, 6–3

=== Doubles ===
(Czech Republic) Jiří Novák / (Romania) Andrei Pavel defeated (Switzerland) Marco Chiudinelli / (Switzerland) Jean-Claude Scherrer, 6–3, 6–1
