= 2009 Allianz Suisse Open Gstaad – Doubles =

Doubles
- 2009 Allianz Suisse Open Gstaad

Final
- Champion: (Switzerland) Marco Chiudinelli (Switzerland) Michael Lammer
- Runner-up: (Czech Republic) Jaroslav Levinský (Slovakia) Filip Polášek
- Score: 7–5, 6–3

Details
- Draw: 16
- Seeds: 4

Events
Singles	Doubles
- Swiss Open

Jaroslav Levinský and Filip Polášek were the defending champions, but lost in the final to Marco Chiudinelli and Michael Lammer, 7–5, 6–3.

== Seeds ==
1. (Czech Republic) Jaroslav Levinský / (Slovakia) Filip Polášek (final)
2. (Germany) Michael Kohlmann / (Argentina) Sebastián Prieto (quarterfinals)
3. (Switzerland) Yves Allegro / (Romania) Horia Tecău (semifinals)
4. (Germany) Christopher Kas / (Germany) Philipp Kohlschreiber (quarterfinals)

== Draw ==
Key

- Q = Qualifier
- WC = Wild card
- LL = Lucky loser
- Alt = Alternate
- ITF = ITF entry
- PR = Protected ranking
- SR = Special ranking
- SE = Special exempt
- JE = Junior exempt
- JR = Junior Accelerator Programme entrant
- CO = College Accelerator Programme entrant
- NG = Next Gen Accelerator Program entrant
- w/o = Walkover
- r = Retired
- d = Defaulted

=== Draw ===
First round
1	(Czech Republic) J Levinský (Slovakia) F Polášek	4	6	[11]
(Brazil) M Daniel (Netherlands) R Wassen	6	1	[9]
(Czech Republic) P Pála (Czech Republic) P Vízner	5	6	[3]
(Germany) N Kiefer (Russia) M Youzhny	7	4	[10]
4	(Germany) C Kas (Germany) P Kohlschreiber	6	5	[10]
(Czech Republic) J Hernych (Czech Republic) I Minář	1	7	[4]
(Argentina) L Arnold Ker (Czech Republic) L Friedl	6	6
(United States) D Martin (Italy) A Motti	4	2
(France) J Chardy (France) F Serra	6	5	[5]
(Argentina) J Acasuso (Argentina) M Vassallo Argüello	0	7	[10]
WC	(Switzerland) S Bohli (Switzerland) J-C Scherrer	2	7	[6]
3	(Switzerland) Y Allegro (Romania) H Tecău	6	5	[10]
WC	(Switzerland) M Chiudinelli (Switzerland) M Lammer	2	7^{7}	[10]
(Australia) R Junaid (Germany) P Marx	6	6^{3}	[8]
WC	(Switzerland) A Sadecky (Switzerland) R Valent	2	5
2	(Germany) M Kohlmann (Argentina) S Prieto	6	7

Quarterfinals
1	(Czech Republic) J Levinský (Slovakia) F Polášek	6	7^{7}
(Germany) N Kiefer (Russia) M Youzhny	3	6^{3}
4	(Germany) C Kas (Germany) P Kohlschreiber	6^{7}	2
(Argentina) L Arnold Ker (Czech Republic) L Friedl	7^{9}	6
(Argentina) J Acasuso (Argentina) M Vassallo Argüello
3	(Switzerland) Y Allegro (Romania) H Tecău	w/o
WC	(Switzerland) M Chiudinelli (Switzerland) M Lammer	6	6
2	(Germany) M Kohlmann (Argentina) S Prieto	4	4

Semifinals
1	(Czech Republic) J Levinský (Slovakia) F Polášek	7^{9}	6
(Argentina) L Arnold Ker (Czech Republic) L Friedl	6^{7}	2
3	(Switzerland) Y Allegro (Romania) H Tecău	4	6^{3}
WC	(Switzerland) M Chiudinelli (Switzerland) M Lammer	6	7^{7}

Final
1	(Czech Republic) J Levinský (Slovakia) F Polášek	5	3
WC	(Switzerland) M Chiudinelli (Switzerland) M Lammer	7	6
