= 2008 Allianz Suisse Open Gstaad – Singles =

Singles
- 2008 Allianz Suisse Open Gstaad

Final
- Champion: (Romania) Victor Hănescu
- Runner-up: (Russia) Igor Andreev
- Score: 6–3, 6–4

Details
- Draw: 28 (4Q / 3WC)
- Seeds: 8

Events
Singles	Doubles
- Swiss Open

Paul-Henri Mathieu was the defending champion, but lost in the second round to Marin Čilić.

Unseeded Victor Hănescu won in the final 6–3, 6–4, against seventh-seeded Igor Andreev.

== Seeds ==
The top four seeds receive a bye into the second round.

1. (Switzerland) Stanislas Wawrinka (semifinals)
2. (France) Paul-Henri Mathieu (second round)
3. (Russia) Mikhail Youzhny (quarterfinals)
4. (Croatia) Ivo Karlović (second round)
5. (Italy) Andreas Seppi (first round)
6. (Germany) Nicolas Kiefer (second round, withdrew due to a right toe injury)
7. (Russia) Igor Andreev (final)
8. (Argentina) Guillermo Cañas (quarterfinals)

== Draw ==
Key

- Q = Qualifier
- WC = Wild card
- LL = Lucky loser
- Alt = Alternate
- ITF = ITF entry
- PR = Protected ranking
- SR = Special ranking
- SE = Special exempt
- JE = Junior exempt
- JR = Junior Accelerator Programme entrant
- CO = College Accelerator Programme entrant
- NG = Next Gen Accelerator Program entrant
- w/o = Walkover
- r = Retired
- d = Defaulted

=== Finals ===
Semifinals
1	(Switzerland) Stanislas Wawrinka	3	6	4
(Romania) Victor Hănescu	6	3	6
(Spain) Guillermo García López	6^{2}	7	6^{5}
7	(Russia) Igor Andreev	7^{7}	5	7^{7}

Final
(Romania) Victor Hănescu	6	6
7	(Russia) Igor Andreev	3	4

=== Top half ===
First round
WC	(Switzerland) R Roshardt	2	6	4
WC	(Switzerland) S Bohli	6	4	6
(Argentina) M Vassallo Argüello	3	4
(Belgium) K Vliegen	6	6
(Czech Republic) I Minář	6^{9}	3
8	(Argentina) G Cañas	7^{11}	6
(France) O Patience	6^{4}	2
(Romania) V Hănescu	7^{7}	6
(Peru) L Horna	6^{5}	7^{8}	5
Q	(France) J Chardy	7^{7}	6^{6}	7
Q	(Germany) D Meffert	6	5	6
5	(Italy) A Seppi	2	7	4

Second round
1	(Switzerland) S Wawrinka	7^{8}	5	7^{7}
WC	(Switzerland) S Bohli	6^{6}	7	6^{3}
(Belgium) K Vliegen
8	(Argentina) G Cañas	w/o
4	(Croatia) I Karlović	7^{7}	6^{3}	6^{11}
(Romania) V Hănescu	6^{4}	7^{7}	7^{13}
Q	(France) J Chardy	6^{1}	7^{7}	7^{7}
Q	(Germany) D Meffert	7^{7}	6^{5}	6^{4}

Quarterfinals
1	(Switzerland) S Wawrinka	4	6	7^{7}
8	(Argentina) G Cañas	6	4	6^{2}
(Romania) V Hănescu	6	7^{7}
Q	(France) J Chardy	3	6^{3}

Semifinals
1	(Switzerland) S Wawrinka	3	6	4
(Romania) V Hănescu	6	3	6

=== Bottom half ===
First round
6	(Germany) N Kiefer	6	6
Q	(Italy) G Naso	3	2
WC	(Switzerland) M Lammer	7	3	2
(Spain) G García López	5	6	6
(Italy) F Cipolla	5	6	6
(Czech Republic) J Vaněk	7	4	4
7	(Russia) I Andreev	6	7
(Brazil) M Daniel	4	5
(France) F Serra	7^{7}	7^{7}
(Spain) D Gimeno Traver	6^{2}	6^{5}
Q	(France) J Ouanna	3	4
(Croatia) M Čilić	6	6

Second round
6	(Germany) N Kiefer
(Spain) G García López	w/o
(Italy) F Cipolla	3	2
3	(Russia) M Youzhny	6	6
7	(Russia) I Andreev	7	6
(France) F Serra	5	4
(Croatia) M Čilić	6	6
2	(France) P-H Mathieu	3	4

Quarterfinals
(Spain) G García López	4	7	6
3	(Russia) M Youzhny	6	5	3
7	(Russia) I Andreev	7^{7}	6
(Croatia) M Čilić	6^{4}	3

Semifinals
(Spain) G García López	6^{2}	7	6^{5}
7	(Russia) I Andreev	7^{7}	5	7^{7}
