= 2009 Allianz Suisse Open Gstaad – Singles =

Singles
- 2009 Allianz Suisse Open Gstaad

Final
- Champion: (Brazil) Thomaz Bellucci
- Runner-up: (Germany) Andreas Beck
- Score: 6–4, 7–6^{(7–2)}

Details
- Draw: 32
- Seeds: 8

Events
Singles	Doubles
- Swiss Open

Victor Hănescu was the defending champion, but lost in the second round to Florent Serra.

Thomaz Bellucci won in the final 6–4, 7–6^{(7–2)}, against Andreas Beck.

== Seeds ==
1. (Switzerland) Stan Wawrinka (second round)
2. (Germany) Philipp Kohlschreiber (first round)
3. (Russia) Igor Andreev (semifinals)
4. (Romania) Victor Hănescu (second round, retired)
5. (France) Jérémy Chardy (quarterfinals)
6. (Germany) Nicolas Kiefer (quarterfinals, retired)
7. (Spain) Feliciano López (first round)
8. (France) Paul-Henri Mathieu (first round)

== Draw ==
Key

- Q = Qualifier
- WC = Wild card
- LL = Lucky loser
- Alt = Alternate
- ITF = ITF entry
- PR = Protected ranking
- SR = Special ranking
- SE = Special exempt
- JE = Junior exempt
- JR = Junior Accelerator Programme entrant
- CO = College Accelerator Programme entrant
- NG = Next Gen Accelerator Program entrant
- w/o = Walkover
- r = Retired
- d = Defaulted

=== Finals ===
Semifinals
Q	(Brazil) Thomaz Bellucci	6	7
3	(Russia) Igor Andreev	4	5
(Brazil) Marcos Daniel	6^{3}	3
(Germany) Andreas Beck	7^{7}	6

Final
Q	(Brazil) Thomaz Bellucci	6	7^{7}
(Germany) Andreas Beck	4	6^{2}

=== Top half ===
First round
1	(Switzerland) S Wawrinka	6	7
Q	(Argentina) F del Bonis	4	5
LL	(Switzerland) M Lammer	7^{7}	6^{5}	4
Q	(Brazil) T Bellucci	6^{5}	7^{7}	6
Q	(Uzbekistan) F Dustov	6^{2}	6	2
(Spain) I Navarro	7^{7}	4	6
(Argentina) J Acasuso	6^{5}	2
6	(Germany) N Kiefer	7^{7}	6
3	(Russia) I Andreev	7	6
(Argentina) D Junqueira	5	4
(Italy) F Cipolla	1	0
(Czech Republic) J Hernych	6	6
(Russia) M Youzhny	6	5	6
WC	(Argentina) G Gaudio	3	7	4
Q	(France) T Ascione	3	3
5	(France) J Chardy	6	6

Second round
1	(Switzerland) S Wawrinka	4	4
Q	(Brazil) T Bellucci	6	6
(Spain) I Navarro	3	7^{7}	2
6	(Germany) N Kiefer	6	6^{3}	6
3	(Russia) I Andreev	6	6
(Czech Republic) J Hernych	4	1
(Russia) M Youzhny	3	7	3
5	(France) J Chardy	6	5	6

Quarterfinals
Q	(Brazil) T Bellucci	3	1
6	(Germany) N Kiefer	6	0^{r}
3	(Russia) I Andreev	6	6
5	(France) J Chardy	3	3

Semifinals
Q	(Brazil) T Bellucci	6	7
3	(Russia) I Andreev	4	5

=== Bottom half ===
First round
8	(France) P-H Mathieu	6^{3}	6^{6}
(Brazil) M Daniel	7^{7}	7^{8}
(France) J Benneteau	7^{7}	7
WC	(Switzerland) S Bohli	6^{4}	5
(Argentina) M Vassallo Argüello	3	2
(France) F Serra	6	6
(Czech Republic) I Minář	2	2
4	(Romania) V Hănescu	6	6
7	(Spain) F López	4	7^{7}	3
(Spain) G García López	6	6^{4}	6
WC	(Switzerland) M Chiudinelli	6	6^{7}	4
(Germany) A Beck	4	7^{9}	6
(Russia) T Gabashvili	1	7^{7}	6
(Chile) P Capdeville	6	6^{3}	3
(Romania) V Crivoi	6	6
2	(Germany) P Kohlschreiber	4	0

Second round
(Brazil) M Daniel	6	7^{10}
(France) J Benneteau	3	6^{8}
(France) F Serra	6	0
4	(Romania) V Hănescu	4	0^{r}
(Spain) G García López	6^{3}	6	6^{3}
(Germany) A Beck	7^{7}	1	7^{7}
(Russia) T Gabashvili	4	4
(Romania) V Crivoi	6	6

Quarterfinals
(Brazil) M Daniel	6	7^{7}
(France) F Serra	4	6^{1}
(Germany) A Beck	6	7^{7}
(Romania) V Crivoi	4	6^{5}

Semifinals
(Brazil) M Daniel	6^{3}	3
(Germany) A Beck	7^{7}	6
