= 2013 Swiss Indoors – Singles =

Singles
- 2013 Swiss Indoors

Final
- Champion: (Argentina) Juan Martín del Potro
- Runner-up: (Switzerland) Roger Federer
- Score: 7–6^{(7–3)}, 2–6, 6–4

Details
- Draw: 32 (4 Q / 3 WC )
- Seeds: 8

Events
Singles	Doubles
- Swiss Indoors

Defending champion Juan Martín del Potro defeated Roger Federer in a rematch of the previous year's final, 7–6^{(7–3)}, 2–6, 6–4 to win the title at the 2013 Swiss Indoors. It was his 17th ATP Tour title overall.

Federer became only the second man in the Open Era to reach the final of an event 10 times, a record he shared at the time with Guillermo Vilas.

== Seeds ==
1. (Argentina) Juan Martín del Potro (champion)
2. (Czech Republic) Tomáš Berdych (first round)
3. (Switzerland) Roger Federer (final)
4. (Switzerland) Stanislas Wawrinka (first round)
5. (France) Richard Gasquet (first round)
6. (Japan) Kei Nishikori (second round)
7. (Italy) Andreas Seppi (first round)
8. (Bulgaria) Grigor Dimitrov (quarterfinals)

== Draw ==
Key

- Q = Qualifier
- WC = Wild card
- LL = Lucky loser
- Alt = Alternate
- ITF = ITF entry
- PR = Protected ranking
- SR = Special ranking
- SE = Special exempt
- JE = Junior exempt
- JR = Junior Accelerator Programme entrant
- CO = College Accelerator Programme entrant
- NG = Next Gen Accelerator Program entrant
- w/o = Walkover
- r = Retired
- d = Defaulted

=== Finals ===
Semifinals
1	(Argentina) Juan Martín del Potro	6	4	6
(France) Édouard Roger-Vasselin	4	6	2
3	(Switzerland) Roger Federer	6	6^{3}	7
(Canada) Vasek Pospisil	3	7^{7}	5

Final
1	(Argentina) Juan Martín del Potro	7^{7}	2	6
3	(Switzerland) Roger Federer	6^{3}	6	4

=== Top half ===
First round
1	(Argentina) JM del Potro	6	6
WC	(Switzerland) H Laaksonen	4	4
Q	(Germany) B Becker	6^{8}	1
(Cyprus) M Baghdatis	7^{10}	6
Q	(France) P-H Mathieu	6	7
Q	(United States) D Kudla	4	5
(France) M Llodra	6	6
5	(France) R Gasquet	4	2
4	(Switzerland) S Wawrinka	4	3
(France) É Roger-Vasselin	6	6
(Romania) V Hănescu	4	4
Q	(Germany) T Kamke	6	6
(Spain) D Gimeno Traver	6^{6}	2
(Poland) Ł Kubot	7^{8}	6
(Germany) D Brands	7^{7}	6
7	(Italy) A Seppi	6^{3}	3

Second round
1	(Argentina) JM del Potro	6	6
(Cyprus) M Baghdatis	1	2
Q	(France) P-H Mathieu	6	6
(France) M Llodra	4	3
(France) É Roger-Vasselin	7	6
Q	(Germany) T Kamke	5	3
(Poland) Ł Kubot	2	4
(Germany) D Brands	6	6

Quarterfinals
1	(Argentina) JM del Potro	6	6
Q	(France) P-H Mathieu	4	4
(France) É Roger-Vasselin	6	4	6
(Germany) D Brands	3	6	3

Semifinals
1	(Argentina) JM del Potro	6	4	6
(France) É Roger-Vasselin	4	6	2

=== Bottom half ===
First round
8	(Bulgaria) G Dimitrov	6	6
(Czech Republic) R Štěpánek	3	3
WC	(Ukraine) A Dolgopolov	6	6
(France) K de Schepper	4	4
(Uzbekistan) D Istomin	7	7^{7}
(Argentina) H Zeballos	5	6^{3}
(France) A Mannarino	4	2
3	(Switzerland) R Federer	6	6
6	(Japan) K Nishikori	6	6
WC	(Switzerland) M Chiudinelli	2	4
(Argentina) C Berlocq	0^{r}
(Croatia) I Dodig	2
(Canada) V Pospisil	6	6
(Netherlands) R Haase	4	4
(Croatia) I Karlović	4	7^{7}	7^{7}
2	(Czech Republic) T Berdych	6	6^{4}	6^{2}

Second round
8	(Bulgaria) G Dimitrov	6	6
WC	(Ukraine) A Dolgopolov	3	2
(Uzbekistan) D Istomin	6	3	2
3	(Switzerland) R Federer	4	6	6
6	(Japan) K Nishikori	1	2
(Croatia) I Dodig	6	6
(Canada) V Pospisil	6	6
(Croatia) I Karlović	3	4

Quarterfinals
8	(Bulgaria) G Dimitrov	3	6^{2}
3	(Switzerland) R Federer	6	7^{7}
(Croatia) I Dodig	6^{11}	4
(Canada) V Pospisil	7^{13}	6

Semifinals
3	(Switzerland) R Federer	6	6^{3}	7
(Canada) V Pospisil	3	7^{7}	5

== Qualifying ==
=== Seeds ===
1. (Germany) Benjamin Becker (qualified)
2. (Germany) Tobias Kamke (qualified)
3. (United States) Michael Russell (first round)
4. (United States) Denis Kudla (qualified)
5. (United States) Jack Sock (qualifying competition)
6. (Ukraine) Sergiy Stakhovsky (qualifying competition)
7. (France) Paul-Henri Mathieu (qualified)
8. (Austria) Andreas Haider-Maurer (qualifying competition)

=== Qualifiers ===
1. (Germany) Benjamin Becker
2. (Germany) Tobias Kamke
3. (France) Paul-Henri Mathieu
4. (United States) Denis Kudla

=== Qualifying draw ===
==== First qualifier ====
First round
1	(Germany) Benjamin Becker	7	6
WC	(Switzerland) Sandro Ehrat	5	3
(Canada) Frank Dancevic	2	4
6	(Ukraine) Sergiy Stakhovsky	6	6

Qualifying competition
1	(Germany) Benjamin Becker	6	6
6	(Ukraine) Sergiy Stakhovsky	4	1

==== Second qualifier ====
First round
2	(Germany) Tobias Kamke	6	6^{10}	6
(Germany) Jan-Lennard Struff	1	7^{12}	2
WC	(Switzerland) Stéphane Bohli	6^{7}	6	6^{2}
5	(United States) Jack Sock	7^{9}	4	7^{7}

Qualifying competition
2	(Germany) Tobias Kamke	6	6
5	(United States) Jack Sock	0	4

==== Third qualifier ====
First round
3	(United States) Michael Russell	0	4
(Lithuania) Ričardas Berankis	6	6
WC	(Switzerland) Michael Lammer	6^{6}	6	1
7	(France) Paul-Henri Mathieu	7^{8}	1	6

Qualifying competition
(Lithuania) Ričardas Berankis	4	7^{7}	1
7	(France) Paul-Henri Mathieu	6	6^{2}	6

==== Fourth qualifier ====
First round
4	(United States) Denis Kudla	1	6	6
(Romania) Marius Copil	6	3	2
(France) Pierre-Hugues Herbert	4	2
8	(Austria) Andreas Haider-Maurer	6	6

Qualifying competition
4	(United States) Denis Kudla	6	6^{2}	6
8	(Austria) Andreas Haider-Maurer	2	7^{7}	1
