= 2006 Allianz Suisse Open Gstaad – Doubles =

Doubles
- 2006 Allianz Suisse Open Gstaad

Final
- Champions: (Czech Republic) Jiří Novák (Romania) Andrei Pavel
- Runners-up: (Switzerland) Marco Chiudinelli (Switzerland) Jean-Claude Scherrer
- Score: 6–3, 6–1

Details
- Draw: 16
- Seeds: 4

Events
Singles	Doubles
- Swiss Open

František Čermák and Leoš Friedl were the defending champions, but lost in the semifinals to eventual champions Jiří Novák and Andrei Pavel.

Novak and Pavel won the title, defeating Marco Chiudinelli and Jean-Claude Scherrer in the final, 6–3, 6–1.

== Seeds ==
1. (Czech Republic) František Čermák / (Czech Republic) Leoš Friedl (semifinals)
2. (Belarus) Max Mirnyi / (Spain) Fernando Verdasco (first round)
3. (Czech Republic) David Škoch / (Netherlands) Rogier Wassen (first round)
4. (Italy) Daniele Bracciali / (Austria) Julian Knowle (first round)

== Draw ==
Key

- Q = Qualifier
- WC = Wild card
- LL = Lucky loser
- Alt = Alternate
- ITF = ITF entry
- PR = Protected ranking
- SR = Special ranking
- SE = Special exempt
- JE = Junior exempt
- JR = Junior Accelerator Programme entrant
- CO = College Accelerator Programme entrant
- NG = Next Gen Accelerator Program entrant
- w/o = Walkover
- r = Retired
- d = Defaulted

=== Draw ===
First round
1	(Czech Republic) F Čermák (Czech Republic) L Friedl	6	7^{7}
(Argentina) C Berlocq (Czech Republic) T Cibulec	2	6^{4}
(Ecuador) N Lapentti (Spain) C Moyá	6	6
(Spain) R Ramírez Hidalgo (Argentina) S Roitman	3	4
3	(Czech Republic) D Škoch (Netherlands) R Wassen	3	4
WC	(Spain) F López (Spain) I Navarro-Pastor	6	6
(Czech Republic) C Suk (Czech Republic) R Vik	4	4
(Czech Republic) J Novák (Romania) A Pavel	6	6
WC	(Switzerland) M Chiudinelli (Switzerland) J-C Scherrer	6	6
(Belgium) C Rochus (Italy) A Seppi	3	2
(France) R Gasquet (France) P-H Mathieu	4	6	[10]
4	(Italy) D Bracciali (Austria) J Knowle	6	3	[5]
(Brazil) M Daniel (Spain) F Vicente	2	3
(Switzerland) Y Allegro (Switzerland) S Wawrinka	6	6
(Belgium) D Norman (Italy) D Sanguinetti	6	7
2	(Belarus) M Mirnyi (Spain) F Verdasco	3	5

Quarterfinals
1	(Czech Republic) F Čermák (Czech Republic) L Friedl	6	6^{4}	[10]
(Ecuador) N Lapentti (Spain) C Moyá	3	7^{7}	[3]
WC	(Spain) F López (Spain) I Navarro-Pastor	1	1
(Czech Republic) J Novák (Romania) A Pavel	6	6
WC	(Switzerland) M Chiudinelli (Switzerland) J-C Scherrer	w/o
(France) R Gasquet (France) P-H Mathieu
(Switzerland) Y Allegro (Switzerland) S Wawrinka	4	6	[10]
(Belgium) D Norman (Italy) D Sanguinetti	6	3	[8]

Semifinals
1	(Czech Republic) F Čermák (Czech Republic) L Friedl	2	2
(Czech Republic) J Novák (Romania) A Pavel	6	6
WC	(Switzerland) M Chiudinelli (Switzerland) J-C Scherrer	7^{9}	6
(Switzerland) Y Allegro (Switzerland) S Wawrinka	6^{7}	3

Final
(Czech Republic) J Novák (Romania) A Pavel	6	6
WC	(Switzerland) M Chiudinelli (Switzerland) J-C Scherrer	3	1
