= 2006 Allianz Suisse Open Gstaad – Singles =

Singles
- 2006 Allianz Suisse Open Gstaad

Final
- Champion: (France) Richard Gasquet
- Runner-up: (Spain) Feliciano López
- Score: 7–6^{(7–4)}, 6–7^{(3–7)}, 6–3, 6–3

Details
- Draw: 32
- Seeds: 8

Events
Singles	Doubles
- Swiss Open

Gastón Gaudio was the defending champion but lost in the quarterfinals to Richard Gasquet.

Richard Gasquet won in the final 7–6^{(7–4)}, 6–7^{(3–7)}, 6–3, 6–3 against Feliciano López.

== Seeds ==
A champion seed is indicated in bold while text in italics indicates the round in which that seed was eliminated.

1. (Croatia) Ivan Ljubičić (quarterfinals)
2. (Argentina) Gastón Gaudio (quarterfinals)
3. (Spain) Fernando Verdasco (quarterfinals)
4. (France) Paul-Henri Mathieu (first round)
5. (Spain) Carlos Moyá (first round)
6. (Spain) Feliciano López (final)
7. (France) **Richard Gasquet (champion)**
8. (Belarus) Max Mirnyi (second round)

== Draw ==
Key

- Q = Qualifier
- WC = Wild card
- LL = Lucky loser
- Alt = Alternate
- ITF = ITF entry
- PR = Protected ranking
- SR = Special ranking
- SE = Special exempt
- JE = Junior exempt
- JR = Junior Accelerator Programme entrant
- CO = College Accelerator Programme entrant
- NG = Next Gen Accelerator Program entrant
- w/o = Walkover
- r = Retired
- d = Defaulted
- NB: The Final was the best of 5 sets while all other rounds were the best of 3 sets.

=== Finals ===
Semifinals
6	**(Spain) Feliciano López**	**7^{7}**	6^{5}	**6**
Q	(Croatia) Marin Čilić	6^{2}	**7^{7}**	3
(Germany) Philipp Kohlschreiber	1	**6**	2
7	**(France) Richard Gasquet**	**6**	1	**6**

Final
6	(Spain) Feliciano López	6^{4}	**7^{7}**	3	3
7	**(France) Richard Gasquet**	**7^{7}**	6^{3}	**6**	**6**

=== Section 1 ===
First round
1	**(Croatia) I Ljubičić**	**6**	**7^{7}**
(Spain) A Portas	3	6^{5}
(Italy) D Sanguinetti	3	2
WC	**(Switzerland) M Chiudinelli**	**6**	**6**
WC	(Switzerland) R Roshardt	1	4
**(Spain) R Ramírez Hidalgo**	**6**	**6**
(Italy) F Volandri	4	4
6	**(Spain) F López**	**6**	**6**
4	(France) P-H Mathieu	**6**	5	6^{6}
Q	**(Serbia) D Vemić**	3	**7**	**7^{8}**
Q	**(Croatia) M Čilić**	**6**	**7^{8}**
(Italy) A Seppi	3	6^{6}
(Switzerland) S Wawrinka	4	**6**	6^{4}
**(Romania) A Pavel**	**6**	1	**7^{7}**
(Argentina) C Berlocq	3	5
8	**(Belarus) M Mirnyi**	**6**	**7**

Second round
1	**(Croatia) I Ljubičić**	6^{6}	**6**	**6**
WC	(Switzerland) M Chiudinelli	**7^{8}**	3	2
(Spain) R Ramírez Hidalgo	**7^{7}**	3	6^{3}
6	**(Spain) F López**	6^{5}	**6**	**7^{7}**
Q	(Serbia) D Vemić	**6**	3	4
Q	**(Croatia) M Čilić**	2	**6**	**6**
**(Romania) A Pavel**	**6**	**6**
8	(Belarus) M Mirnyi	2	4

Quarterfinals
1	(Croatia) I Ljubičić	6^{4}	3
6	**(Spain) F López**	**7^{7}**	**6**
Q	**(Croatia) M Čilić**	6^{5}	**6**	**7**
(Romania) A Pavel	**7^{7}**	3	5

Semifinals
6	**(Spain) F López**	**7^{7}**	6^{5}	**6**
Q	(Croatia) M Čilić	6^{2}	**7^{7}**	3

=== Section 2 ===
First round
5	(Spain) C Moyá	3	2
WC	**(Czech Republic) J Novák**	**6**	**6**
**(Germany) P Kohlschreiber**	**6**	**6**
(Italy) A di Mauro	3	1
(Brazil) F Saretta	**7**	1	4
**(Italy) D Bracciali**	5	**6**	**6**
Q	(Belgium) D Norman	4	3
3	**(Spain) F Verdasco**	**6**	**6**
7	**(France) R Gasquet**	**6**	**6**
(Germany) S Greul	3	3
Q	(Czech Republic) R Vögeli	2	1
**(Czech Republic) R Vik**	**6**	**6**
(Spain) F Vicente	1	**6**	2
**(Belgium) C Rochus**	**6**	4	**6**
(Brazil) M Daniel	6^{4}	2
2	**(Argentina) G Gaudio**	**7^{7}**	**6**

Second round
WC	(Czech Republic) J Novák	**6**	6^{5}	1
**(Germany) P Kohlschreiber**	3	**7^{7}**	**6**
(Italy) D Bracciali	3	1
3	**(Spain) F Verdasco**	**6**	**6**
7	**(France) R Gasquet**	**6**	**6**
(Czech Republic) R Vik	1	1
(Belgium) C Rochus	0	4
2	**(Argentina) G Gaudio**	**6**	**6**

Quarterfinals
**(Germany) P Kohlschreiber**	**6**	4	**6**
3	(Spain) F Verdasco	3	**6**	4
7	**(France) R Gasquet**	**6**	**6**
2	(Argentina) G Gaudio	3	2

Semifinals
(Germany) P Kohlschreiber	1	**6**	2
7	**(France) R Gasquet**	**6**	1	**6**
