= 2008 Allianz Suisse Open Gstaad =

- Date: 7–13 July
- Edition: 41st
- Category: International Series
- Draw: 28S / 16D
- Prize money: €368,000
- Surface: Clay / outdoor
- Location: Gstaad, Switzerland
- Venue: Roy Emerson Arena

Champions

Singles
- (Romania) Victor Hănescu

Doubles
- (Czech Republic) Jaroslav Levinský / (Slovakia) Filip Polášek
- Swiss Open

The 2008 Allianz Suisse Open Gstaad was a men's tennis tournament played on outdoor clay courts. It was the 41st edition of the Allianz Suisse Open Gstaad, and was part of the International Series of the 2008 ATP Tour. It took place at the Roy Emerson Arena in Gstaad, Switzerland, from 7 July through 13 July 2008.

The singles draw featured ATP No. 10, Rome Masters and Doha runner-up Stan Wawrinka, Marseille and Munich semifinalist, and Gstaad defending champion Paul-Henri Mathieu, and Australian Open quarterfinalist and Chennai titlist Mikhail Youzhny. Other seeded players were two-time Nottingham champion Ivo Karlović, Bergamo Challenger winner and 2007 Gstaad finalist Andreas Seppi, Nicolas Kiefer, Igor Andreev and Guillermo Cañas.

== Finals ==
=== Singles ===
(Romania) Victor Hănescu defeated (Russia) Igor Andreev, 6–3, 6–4

- It was Victor Hănescu's 1st career title.

=== Doubles ===
(Czech Republic) Jaroslav Levinský / (Slovakia) Filip Polášek defeated (Switzerland) Stéphane Bohli / (Switzerland) Stan Wawrinka, 3–6, 6–2, [11–9]
