= Jean-Claude Scherrer =

Swiss tennis player

- Country (sports): Switzerland
- Residence: Reichenburg, Switzerland
- Born: 20 July 1978 (age 46); Uznach, Switzerland
- Height: 1.87 m (6 ft 1 1/2 in)
- Turned pro: 1998
- Plays: Right-handed
- Prize money: US$232,453

Singles
- Career record: 1–5
- Career titles: 0
- Highest ranking: No. 220 (9 August 2004)

Grand Slam singles results
- US Open: Q1 (2004)

Doubles
- Career record: 22–22
- Career titles: 0
- Highest ranking: No. 77 (21 July 2008)

Grand Slam doubles results
- Australian Open: 2R (2009)
- French Open: 3R (2008)
- Wimbledon: 2R (2008)

Jean-Claude Scherrer (born 20 July 1978) is a former professional tennis player from Switzerland who entered professional play in 1998.

== Career finals ==
=== Doubles (2 losses) ===
Legend (pre/post 2009)
ATP International Series /
ATP World Tour 250 Series (2)

Result	W/L	Date	Tournament	Surface	Partner	Opponents	Score
Loss	0–1	Jul 2006	Gstaad, Switzerland	Clay	(Switzerland) Marco Chiudinelli	(Czech Republic) Jiří Novák (Romania) Andrei Pavel	3–6, 1–6
Loss	0–2	Jan 2009	Chennai, India	Hard	(Switzerland) Stanislas Wawrinka	(United States) Eric Butorac (United States) Rajeev Ram	3–6, 4–6
