= Marco Chiudinelli =

Swiss tennis player (born 1981)

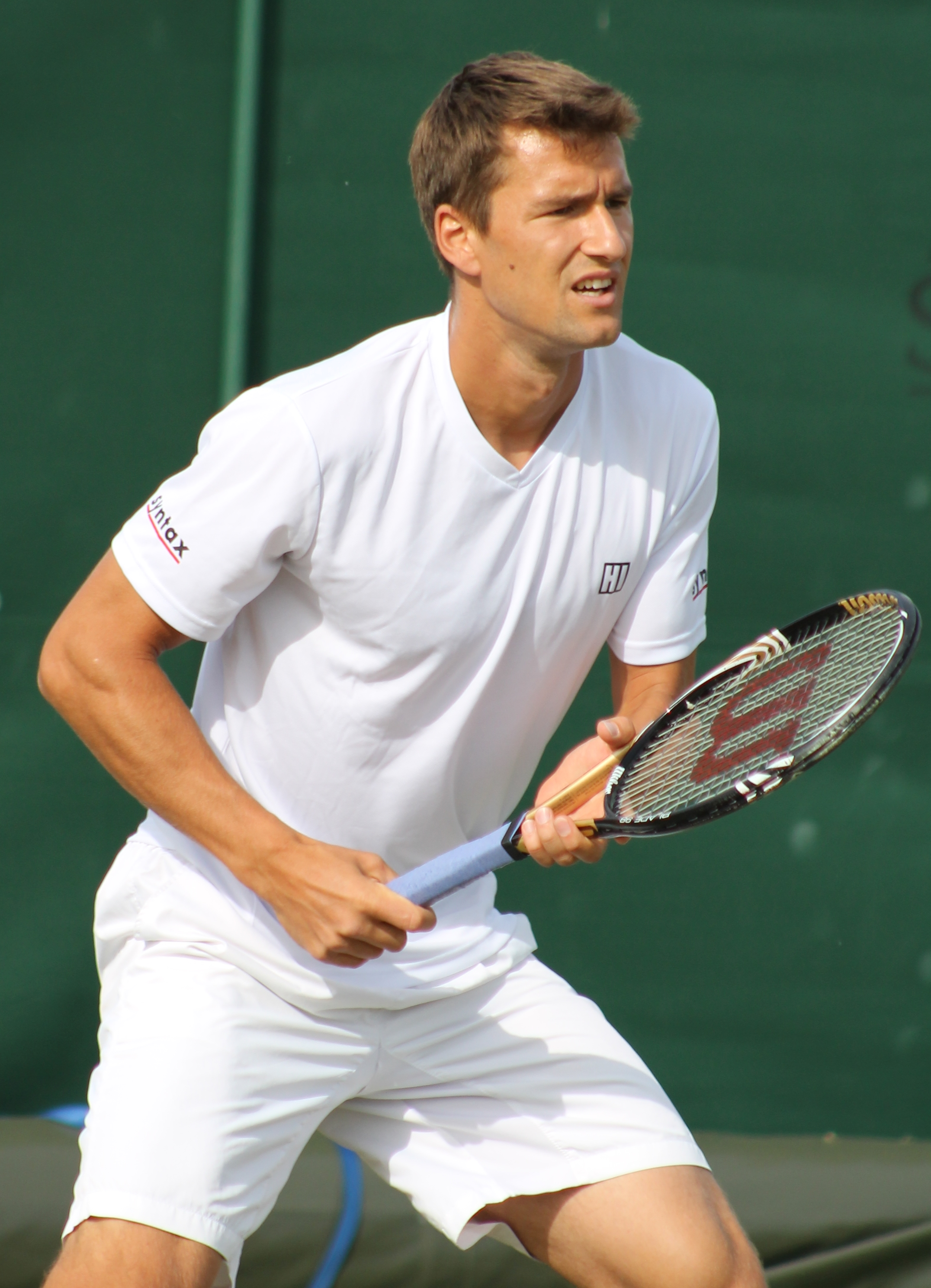
- Country (sports): Switzerland
- Residence: Füllinsdorf, Switzerland
- Born: 10 September 1981 (age 44) Basel, Switzerland
- Height: 1.88 m (6 ft 2 in)
- Turned pro: 2000
- Retired: 2017
- Plays: Right-handed (two-handed backhand)
- Prize money: $2,023,620
- Official website: marcochiudinelli.com

Singles
- Career record: 52–98
- Career titles: 0
- Highest ranking: No. 52 (22 February 2010)

Grand Slam singles results
- Australian Open: 2R (2010)
- French Open: 2R (2010)
- Wimbledon: 1R (2010)
- US Open: 3R (2006, 2009)

Doubles
- Career record: 27–55
- Career titles: 1
- Highest ranking: No. 118 (2 November 2009)

Grand Slam doubles results
- Australian Open: 1R (2010)
- French Open: 1R (2009, 2010)
- Wimbledon: 1R (2003, 2010)
- US Open: 2R (2010)

Team competitions
- Davis Cup: W (2014)

Marco Chiudinelli (born 10 September 1981) is a retired tennis player from Switzerland. A member of Switzerland's winning 2014 Davis Cup squad, he reached his highest singles ranking of 52 in February 2010 during a career that was often hindered by injury.

== Biography ==
Marco grew up in Münchenstein and learned to play tennis at Basel Lawn Tennis Club. He later joined a region-wide tennis group, where he first met Roger Federer, who belonged to the nearby Old Boys Tennis Club. They quickly became friends but were soon the 'black sheep' of the group, with one or the other often forced to sit on the sidelines for disciplinary reasons.

In 1993 he finished as runner-up to Federer at the Swiss 12-and-under indoor championship in Lucerne. As a teenager he moved to Biel to further his tennis education, joining Federer and the older Yves Allegro, who were then staying in an apartment together, and the trio spent many hours playing video games when not practicing tennis. In 2001, at the suggestion of Allegro, Chiudinelli moved to Halle in Germany to train.

== Career ==
=== Early career, 2000–2005 ===
Marco Chiudinelli played his first professional matches in 2000, but did not compete on a regular basis until 2002. That year he won his first tournament on the third-tier Futures circuit in Dubai, defeating a 16-year-old Jimmy Wang in the final. He finished as runner-up to Grégory Carraz at a Futures event in Poitiers in March and secured a second Futures title at Syros in April.

Over the following months he tried unsuccessfully to qualify for the main draw of the Gerry Weber Open in Halle, the Mercedes-Benz Cup in Los Angeles, and the Canada Masters in Toronto. He also attempted to qualify for the 2002 US Open, winning against a fading Cédric Pioline in the first round – this was technically a win by retirement, as Pioline stormed off court while 0-5 down in the third set. He lost in the next round of qualifying to Argentine Gastón Etlis. He spent the bulk of the 2003 season playing on the Challenger Tour and reached the semi-final stage of events in Fergana and, after coming through qualifying, Nottingham, where he lost to second seed John Van Lottum.

Chiudinelli began 2004 well, winning 18 of his first 22 matches. He won another Futures title in January in Doha and the following month reached his first Challenger final in Belgrade – along the way defeating a teenage Novak Djokovic in one of his earliest professional appearances. He won his first main draw match on the ATP Tour at the 2004 Gerry Weber Open, overcoming compatriot Michel Kratochvil in straight sets, but lost in the next round to Jiří Novák. In September he took his first Challenger title in Donetsk and came through qualifying at the 2004 AIG Japan Open in Tokyo in October, eventually reaching the round of 16 after upset victories over the higher ranked Alexander Peya and Dennis van Scheppingen. At the 2004 Swiss Indoors, his hometown tournament, Chiudinelli defeated Albert Montañés in the first round, and lost his next match to Rainer Schüttler. He finished the season ranked 142 in the world and having earned $97,936 in prize money, which was more than twice as high as the previous two seasons combined.

Chiudinelli's ranking reached a then high of 129 in January 2005 after making the round of 16 at the Qatar Open. He soon received his first call up to the Switzerland Davis Cup team for the tie versus the Netherlands, losing in five sets to the more established Sjeng Schalken, and later winning the dead rubber against Peter Wessels. After retiring through injury in his second round match against Michael Ryderstedt at Wimbledon Qualifying in June, Chiudinelli was later forced to get surgery to heal persistent pain in his shoulder. As a consequence he did not play for the remainder of the season and his ranking fell to 287.

=== 2006–2008 ===
Chiudinelli initially struggled to recover his ranking during the first half of 2006 and had fallen to 775 in the world by the start of May. That same month he won 10 straight matches to take successive Futures titles in Kuwait. After coming through qualifying at the Gerry Weber Open, Chiudinelli defeated Christophe Rochus in the main draw, before falling to the seeded Kristof Vliegen in the second round – the ranking points from this event moving him back up to 359.

In July Chiudinelli enjoyed some success in doubles with partner Jean-Claude Scherrer, the pair finishing as runners-up at the Suisse Open in Gstaad. At the 2006 US Open as a qualifier, he defeated Fernando Vicente and Feliciano López in his first two matches. He then fell to 25th seed Richard Gasquet in four sets, though the points accumulated from this event ensured he broke back into the top 200. Following the US Open, Chiudinelli won the dead rubber against Serbia's Janko Tipsarević at the 2006 Davis Cup World Group play-offs and made the semi-final of the Mons Challenger in October. He experienced a disappointing first round defeat to 5th seed David Ferrer at the 2006 Swiss Indoors, having taken the first set in a tiebreak. He ended the season at 155 in the world, with earnings of $114,646 in singles.

He played less during the 2007 and 2008 tennis seasons, owing to persistent injury problems.

=== 2009–2014 ===
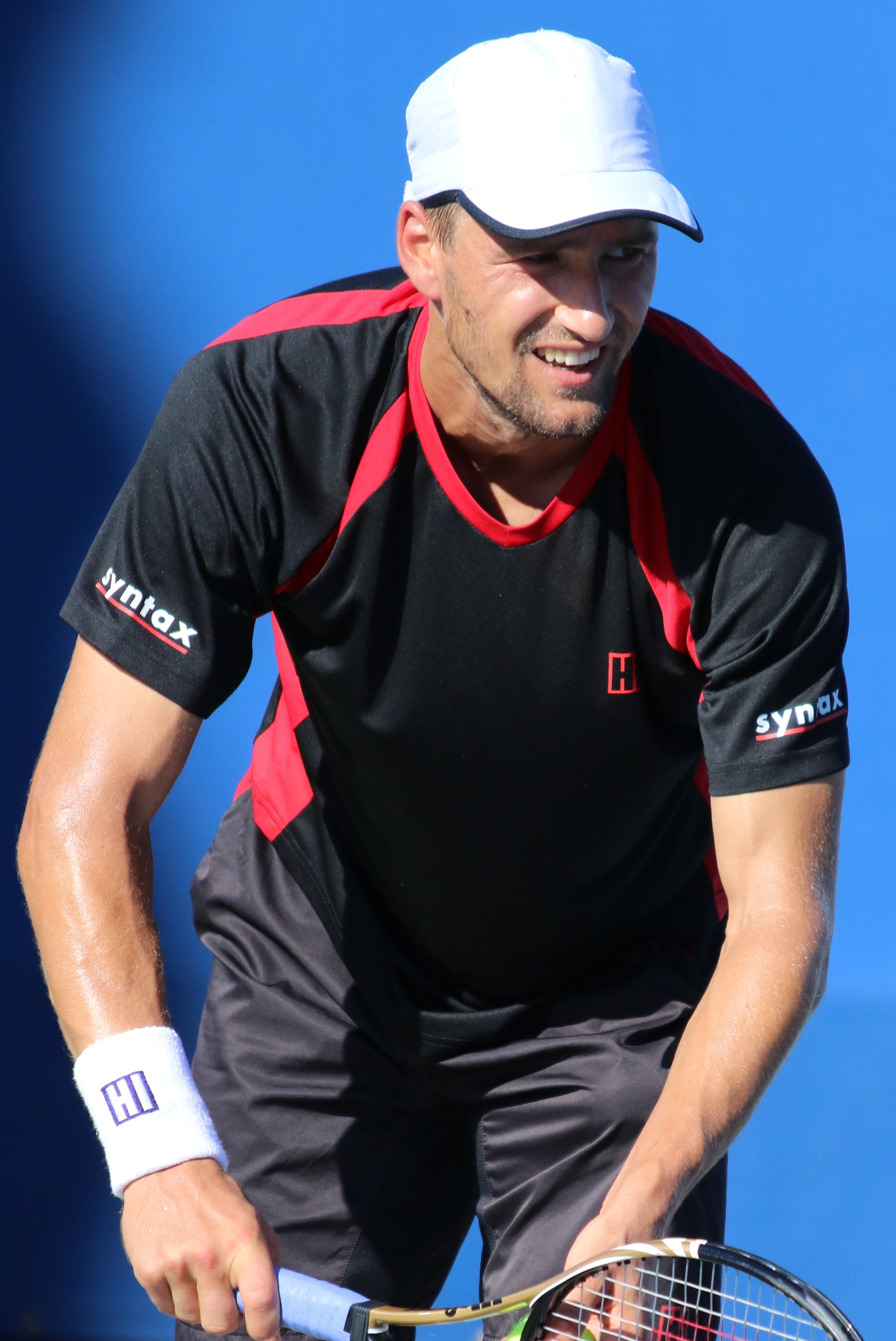
Chiudinelli playing Guilherme Clezar at the 2016 US Open

Chuidinelli entered the 2009 PTT Thailand Open, again as qualifier, and defeated German qualifier Florian Mayer in the first round and followed that up with a second-round win over former world No. 1 Marat Safin. He lost in a three-set match to top seed Jo-Wilfried Tsonga in the quarterfinals.

He reached the semifinals in Basel, his hometown tournament by beating eighth seed Philipp Kohlschreiber, and his countryman, qualifier Michael Lammer. He also defeated Richard Gasquet before losing to compatriot and world No. 1 Roger Federer in the semifinals.

Chiudinelli qualified for the main draw of the 2010 Australian Open and reached the second round, taking a set off world No. 3, Novak Djokovic. Two weeks later as a result of his play in 2009, he was awarded Comeback Player of the Year in the 2009 ATP World Tour Awards.

At the 2010 French Open, Chiudinelli was accepted into the main draw by direct entry and beat Somdev Devvarman to advance to the second round for the first time. There he lost to American John Isner in a match that extended over two days because of rain.

=== Later career, 2015–2017 ===
He also played the longest doubles match ever with Stanislas Wawrinka, being defeated by Lukáš Rosol and Tomáš Berdych of the Czech Republic in the first round of the 2013 Davis Cup. The match, played on 2 February 2013, lasted 7 hours, 2 minutes.

Chiudinelli again represented Switzerland in the 2014 Davis Cup World Group first round, partnering Michael Lammer. His doubles victory with Lammer clinched the first-round victory over Serbia, allowing Switzerland to advance to the quarterfinals for the first time since 2004. Switzerland went on to win its first Davis Cup in history.

At the 2014 Gerry Weber Open in Halle, Chiudinelli played doubles with childhood friend and Roger Federer. They reached the final and held championship points, but lost a close tiebreaker.

In 2016, Chiudinelli qualified for the US Open and beat fellow qualifier Guilherme Clezar in the first round in four sets. This was Chiudinelli's first main-draw Grand Slam tournament victory since the 2010 US Open. In the second round, he faced Lucas Pouille. Chiudinelli was two sets and a break up in the third set and was serving for the match at 5–4, but was broken. He then lost the resulting tiebreaker and could not regain his form in the last two sets.

Chiudinelli then received a wild card into the 2016 Swiss Indoors tournament where he took on compatriot Stan Wawrinka in the first round and lost in three sets 7–6^{(7–1)}, 1–6, 4–6, despite leading the match against the newly crowned 2016 US Open champion.

In 2017, after an injury plagued-season, Chiudinelli announced on his website that he would be retiring following the 2017 Swiss Indoors tournament where he enjoyed the greatest success of his career, reaching the semifinals in 2009.

== ATP career finals ==
=== Doubles: 4 (1 title, 3 runner-ups) ===
Legend Grand Slam Tournaments (0–0) ATP World Tour Masters 1000 (0–0) ATP World Tour 500 Series (0–0) ATP World Tour 250 Series (1–3)	Finals by surface Hard (0–0) Clay (1–1) Grass (0–2) Carpet (0–0)

Result	W–L	Date	Tournament	Surface	Partner	Opponents	Score
Loss	0–1	Jul 2006	Gstaad, Switzerland	Clay	(Switzerland) Jean-Claude Scherrer	(Czech Republic) Jiří Novák (Romania) Andrei Pavel	3–6, 1–6
Loss	0–2	Jul 2009	Halle, Germany	Grass	(Germany) Andreas Beck	(Germany) Christopher Kas (Germany) Philipp Kohlschreiber	3–6, 4–6
Win	1–2	Aug 2009	Gstaad, Switzerland	Clay	(Switzerland) Michael Lammer	(Czech Republic) Jaroslav Levinský (Slovakia) Filip Polášek	7–5, 6–3
Loss	1–3	Jun 2014	Halle, Germany	Grass	(Switzerland) Roger Federer	(Germany) Andre Begemann (Austria) Julian Knowle	6–1, 5–7, [10–12]

== ATP Challenger Tour & ITF Futures ==
=== Singles: 15 (10 titles, 5 runner-ups) ===
Legend Challenger (3–4) Futures (7–1)	Finals by surface Hard (10–2) Clay (0–0) Carpet (0–3)	Finals by setting Outdoors (9–2) Indoors (1–3)

Result	No.	Date	Tournament	Surface	Opponent	Score
Win	1.	3 February 2002	Dubai, UAE	Hard	(Chinese Taipei) Jimmy Wang	7–6^{(7–5)}, 6–2
Loss	1.	24 March 2002	Poitiers, France	Carpet (i)	(France) Gregory Carraz	6–7^{(8–10)}, 2–6
Win	2.	14 April 2002	Syros, Greece	Hard	(Belgium) Jeroen Masson	6–7^{(5–7)}, 6–2, 6–4
Win	3.	28 April 2003	Namangan, Uzbekistan	Hard	(Pakistan) Aisam-ul-Haq Qureshi	6–1, 7–6^{(7–1)}
Win	4.	25 January 2004	Doha, Qatar	Hard	(Italy) Uros Vico	6–2, 6–4
Loss	1.	2 February 2004	Belgrade, Serbia	Carpet (i)	(Serbia) Nenad Zimonjić	6–2, 6–7^{(2–7)}, 4–6
Win	1.	6 September 2004	Donetsk, Ukraine	Hard	(Croatia) Saša Tuksar	6–3, 6–2
Win	5.	21 May 2006	Mishref, Kuwait	Hard	(Egypt) Mohamed Mamoun	6–0, 6–2
Win	6.	4 June 2006	Mishref, Kuwait	Hard	(Slovakia) Viktor Bruthans	6–1, 4–6, 6–0
Win	7.	23 November 2008	Dubai, UAE	Hard	(Monaco) Benjamin Balleret	6–1, 6–0
Win	2.	27 April 2009	Tenerife, Spain	Hard	(Italy) Paolo Lorenzi	6–3, 6–4
Loss	2.	4 March 2013	Kyoto, Japan	Carpet (i)	(Australia) John Millman	6–4, 4–6, 6–7^{(2–7)}
Loss	3.	9 August 2015	Segovia, Spain	Hard	(Russia) Evgeny Donskoy	6–7^{(2–7)}, 3–6
Loss	4.	24 January 2016	Manila, Philippines	Hard	(Russia) Mikhail Youzhny	4–6, 4–6
Win	3.	21 February 2016	Wrocław, Poland	Hard (i)	(Czech Republic) Jan Hernych	6–3, 7–6^{(11–9)}

=== Doubles: 17 (6 titles, 11 runner-ups) ===
Legend Challenger (6–11)	Finals by surface Hard (5–8) Clay (0–2) Carpet (1–1)	Finals by setting Outdoors (4–8) Indoors (2–3)

Result	No.	Date	Tournament	Surface	Partner	Opponents	Score
Loss	1.	22 October 2001	Seoul, Korea	Hard	(Switzerland) Yves Allegro	(Czech Republic) František Čermák (Czech Republic) Jaroslav Levinský	7–5, 6–7^{(8–10)}, 3–6
Loss	2.	29 October 2001	Yokohama, Japan	Carpet (i)	(Germany) Sebastian Jäger	(Japan) Takao Suzuki (Japan) Mitsuru Takada	3–6, 4–6
Loss	3.	19 November 2001	Puebla, Mexico	Hard	(Finland) Tuomas Ketola	(Israel) Jonathan Erlich (Israel) Andy Ram	4–6, 7–6^{(7–5)}, 1–6
Win	1.	30 September 2002	Bukhara, Uzbekistan	Hard	(Switzerland) Yves Allegro	(Serbia and Montenegro) Janko Tipsarević (Germany) Jan Weinzierl	6–3, 6–4
Loss	4.	28 October 2002	Réunion, Réunion Island	Hard	(Czech Republic) Jaroslav Levinský	(Argentina) Federico Browne (Israel) Jonathan Erlich	1–6, 6–4, 3–6
Loss	5.	6 September 2004	Donetsk, Ukraine	Hard	(Croatia) Lovro Zovko	(Russia) Igor Kunitsyn (Italy) Uros Vico	6–3, 3–6, 4–6
Loss	6.	25 April 2005	Tunis, Tunisia	Clay	(Switzerland) Jean-Claude Scherrer	(Germany) Tomas Behrend (Sweden) Robert Lindstedt	6–3, 1–6, 3–6
Loss	7.	13 November 2006	Dnipropetrovsk, Ukraine	Hard (i)	(Croatia) Lovro Zovko	(Ukraine) Sergiy Stakhovsky (Ukraine) Orest Tereshchuk	3–6, 0–6
Loss	8.	3 November 2008	Astana, Kazakhstan	Hard	(Switzerland) George Bastl	(Russia) Mikhail Elgin (Russia) Alexander Kudryavtsev	4–6, 7–6^{(10–8)}, [8–10]
Loss	9.	26 March 2013	San Luis Potosí, Mexico	Clay	(Germany) Peter Gojowczyk	(Croatia) Marin Draganja (Spain) Adrián Menéndez Maceiras	4–6, 3–6
Win	2.	21 July 2014	Astana, Kazakhstan	Hard	(Ukraine) Sergei Bubka	(Chinese Taipei) Chen Ti (Chinese Taipei) Huang Liang-chi	6–3, 6–4
Win	3.	23 November 2015	Andria, Italy	Hard (i)	(Germany) Frank Moser	(Germany) Dustin Brown (Australia) Carsten Ball	7–6^{(7–5)}, 7–5
Loss	10.	18 September 2016	Istanbul, Turkey	Hard	(Romania) Marius Copil	(France) Sadio Doumbia (France) Calvin Hemery	4–6, 3–6
Win	4.	25 September 2016	İzmir, Turkey	Hard	(Romania) Marius Copil	(France) Sadio Doumbia (France) Calvin Hemery	6–4, 6–4
Loss	11.	23 October 2016	Brest, France	Hard (i)	(Italy) Luca Vanni	(Netherlands) Sander Arends (Poland) Mateusz Kowalczyk	7–6^{(7–2)}, 3–6, [5–10]
Win	5.	23 April 2017	Taipei, Taiwan	Carpet (i)	(Croatia) Franko Škugor	(Thailand) Sanchai Ratiwatana (Thailand) Sonchat Ratiwatana	4–6, 6–2, [10–5]
Win	6.	7 May 2017	Gimcheon, South Korea	Hard	(Russia) Teymuraz Gabashvili	(South Africa) Ruan Roelofse (Chinese Taipei) Yi Chu-huan	6–1, 6–3

== Singles performance timeline ==
Key
W	F	SF	QF	#R	RR	Q#	DNQ	A	NH

(W) winner; (F) finalist; (SF) semifinalist; (QF) quarterfinalist; (#R) rounds 4, 3, 2, 1; (RR) round-robin stage; (Q#) qualification round; (DNQ) did not qualify; (A) absent; (NH) not held; (SR) strike rate (events won / competed); (W–L) win–loss record.

Tournament	2000	2001	2002	2003	2004	2005	2006	2007	2008	2009	2010	2011	2012	2013	2014	2015	2016	2017	SR	W–L
Grand Slam tournaments
Australian Open	A	A	A	Q1	A	Q1	A	1R	A	Q3	2R	Q1	A	Q3	Q1	A	Q2	Q1	0 / 2	1–2
French Open	A	A	Q1	A	Q2	Q1	A	A	A	A	2R	Q1	Q1	A	Q1	A	Q1	Q1	0 / 1	1–1
Wimbledon	A	A	Q1	Q1	Q2	Q2	A	A	A	Q2	1R	Q3	Q2	Q1	Q3	Q2	Q1	Q1	0 / 1	0–1
US Open	A	A	Q2	A	Q1	A	3R	A	A	3R	2R	Q2	Q1	Q1	1R	Q3	2R	Q2	0 / 5	6–5
Win–loss	0–0	0–0	0–0	0–0	0–0	0–0	2–1	0–1	0–0	2–1	3–4	0–0	0–0	0–0	0–1	0–0	1–1	0–0	0 / 9	8–9
National representation
Davis Cup	A	A	A	A	A	1R	PO	1R	A	1R	1R	Z1	1R	1R	W	PO	1R	1R	1 / 9	8–13
Swiss tournaments
Swiss Open	Q3	A	A	A	1R	A	2R	A	A	1R	2R	A	A	1R	A	1R	1R	1R	0 / 8	2–8
Swiss Indoors	A	A	Q1	Q3	2R	A	1R	1R	1R	SF	1R	1R	2R	1R	1R	1R	1R	1R	0 / 13	5–13
Career Statistics
Overall win–loss	0–0	0–0	0–0	0–1	4–7	2–3	5–5	3–3	0–1	10–13	14–29	3–4	4–10	1–5	0–4	1–3	3–5	2–5	52–98	
Year-end ranking	381	365	256	289	142	287	155	487	605	56	117	177	146	173	211	282	120	418	35%	

== National participation ==
=== Davis Cup (9 wins, 19 losses) ===
Group membership World Group (4–13) WG play-off (4–6) Group I (1–0) Group II (0–0)	Matches by surface Hard (7–11) Clay (0–7) Grass (0–0) Carpet (2–1)	Matches by type Singles (8–13) Doubles (1–6)	Matches by setting Indoors (9–17) Outdoors (0–2)	Matches by venue Switzerland (8–7) Away (1–12)

- ▲ ▼ indicates the result of the Davis Cup match followed by the score, date, place of event, the zonal classification and its phase, and the court surface.

Result	No.	Rubber	Match type (partner if any)	Opponent nation	Opponent player(s)	Score
▼2–3; 4–6 March 2005; Expo Centre, Fribourg, Switzerland; World Group first round; hard(i) surface
Defeat	1	I	Singles	Netherlands	Sjeng Schalken	6–7^{(4–7)}, 6–4, 3–6, 7–5, 2–6
Victory	2	V	Singles (dead rubber)	Netherlands	Peter Wessels	4–6, retired
▲4–1; 22–24 September 2006; Palexpo, Geneva, Switzerland; World Group play-offs; hard(i) surface
Victory	3	V	Singles (dead rubber)	Serbia and Montenegro	Janko Tipsarević	6–4, 6–1
▼2–3; 9–11 February 2007; Palexpo, Geneva, Switzerland; World Group first round; carpet(i) surface
Victory	4	I	Singles	Spain	Fernando Verdasco	6–3, 6–4, 3–6, 7–6^{(7–2)}
Defeat	5	III	Doubles (with Yves Allegro)	Spain	Feliciano López / Fernando Verdasco	6–7^{(5–7)}, 7–6^{(7–3)}, 7–6^{(7–2)}, 1–6, 10–12
Victory	6	V	Singles (dead rubber)	Spain	David Ferrer	3–6, 6–3, 6–3
▼1–4; 6–8 March 2009; Birmingham–Jefferson Convention Complex, Birmingham, United States; World Group first round; hard(i) surface
Defeat	7	II	Singles	United States	Andy Roddick	1–6, 3–6, 6–7^{(5–7)}
Defeat	8	V	Singles (dead rubber)	United States	James Blake	4–6, 6–7^{(6–8)}
▲3–2; 18–20 September 2009; Centro Sportivo "Valletta Cambiaso", Genoa, Italy; World Group play-offs; clay surface
Defeat	9	III	Doubles (with Stan Wawrinka)	Italy	Simone Bolelli / Potito Starace	2–6, 4–6, 6–7^{(3–7)}
▼1–4; 5–7 March 2010; Plaza de Toros de La Ribera, Logroño, Spain; World Group first round; clay(i) surface
Defeat	10	I	Singles	Spain	David Ferrer	2–6, 6–7^{(5–7)}, 1–6
Defeat	11	V	Singles (dead rubber)	Spain	Nicolás Almagro	1–6, 3–6
▼0–5; 17–19 September 2010; National Tennis Centre, Astana, Kazakhstan; World Group play-offs; hard(i) surface
Defeat	12	I	Singles	Kazakhstan	Andrey Golubev	4–6, 4–6, 4–6
Defeat	13	V	Singles (dead rubber)	Kazakhstan	Mikhail Kukushkin	2–6, 4–6
▲5–0; 8–10 July 2011; PostFinance-Arena, Bern, Switzerland; Group I Europe/Africa second round; hard(i) surface
Victory	14	IV	Singles (dead rubber)	Portugal	João Sousa	6–3, 6–4
▼0–5; 10–12 February 2012; Forum Fribourg, Fribourg, Switzerland; World Group first round; clay(i) surface
Defeat	15	V	Singles (dead rubber)	United States	John Isner	3–6, 4–6
▲3–2; 14–16 September 2012; Westergasfabriek, Amsterdam, Netherlands; World Group play-offs; clay surface
Defeat	16	V	Singles (dead rubber)	Netherlands	Thiemo de Bakker	2–6, 6–7^{(4–7)}
▼2–3; 1–3 February 2013; Palexpo, Geneva, Switzerland; World Group first round; hard(i) surface
Defeat	17	III	Doubles (with Stan Wawrinka)	Czech Republic	Tomáš Berdych / Lukáš Rosol	4–6, 7–5, 4–6, 7–6^{(7–3)}, 22–24
▲4–1; 13–15 September 2013; Patinoire du Littoral, Neuchâtel, Switzerland; World Group play-offs; hard(i) surface
Victory	18	II	Singles	Ecuador	Julio César Campozano	3–6, 6–1, 6–3, 7–6^{(9–7)}
Defeat	19	V	Singles (dead rubber)	Ecuador	Gonzalo Escobar	0–6, 5–7
▲3–2; 31 January – 2 February 2014; SPENS, Novi Sad, Serbia; World Group first round; hard(i) surface
Victory	20	III	Doubles (with Michael Lammer)	Serbia	Filip Krajinović / Nenad Zimonjić	7–6^{(9–7)}, 3–6, 7–6^{(7–2)}, 6–2
Defeat	21	V	Singles (dead rubber)	Serbia	Filip Krajinović	4–6, 4–6
▲3–2; 12–14 September 2014; Palexpo, Geneva, Switzerland; World Group semifinal; hard(i) surface
Defeat	22	III	Doubles (with Stan Wawrinka)	Italy	Simone Bolelli / Fabio Fognini	5–7, 6–3, 7–5, 3–6, 2–6
▲4–1; 18–20 September 2015; Palexpo, Geneva, Switzerland; World Group play-offs; hard(i) surface
Defeat	23	III	Doubles (with Roger Federer)	Netherlands	Thiemo de Bakker / Matwé Middelkoop	6–7^{(7–9)}, 6–4, 6–4, 4–6, 1–6
▼0–5; 4–6 March 2016; Adriatic Arena, Pesaro, Italy; World Group first round; clay(i) surface
Defeat	24	I	Singles	Italy	Paolo Lorenzi	6–7^{(14–16)}, 3–6, 6–4, 7–5, 5–7
Defeat	25	III	Doubles (with Henri Laaksonen)	Italy	Simone Bolelli / Andreas Seppi	3–6, 1–6, 3–6
▼0–5; 3–5 February 2017; Legacy Arena / BJCC, Birmingham, United States; World Group first round; hard(i) surface
Defeat	26	I	Singles	United States	Jack Sock	4–6, 3–6, 1–6
▲3–2; 15–17 September 2017; Swiss Tennis Arena, Biel, Switzerland; World Group play-offs; hard(i) surface
Victory	27	II	Singles	Belarus	Dzmitry Zhyrmont	6–3, 4–6, 6–4, 6–3
Victory	28	IV	Singles	Belarus	Yaraslav Shyla	6–4, 6–3, 6–4

==== Wins: 1 ====
Edition	(Switzerland) Swiss Team	Rounds/Opponents
2014 Davis Cup	Roger Federer; Stanislas Wawrinka; Michael Lammer; Marco Chiudinelli	1R: SUI 3–2 SRB; QF: SUI 3–2 KAZ; SF: SUI 3–2 ITA; F: SUI 3–1 FRA
