= Michael Lammer =

Swiss tennis player (born 1982)

- Country (sports): Switzerland
- Residence: Dübendorf, Switzerland
- Born: 25 March 1982 (age 43); Kilchberg, Zürich, Switzerland
- Height: 1.85 m (6 ft 1 in)
- Turned pro: 2002
- Retired: 2015
- Plays: Right-handed (one-handed backhand)
- Prize money: US$ 533,475

Singles
- Career record: 7–24
- Career titles: 0
- Highest ranking: No. 150 (9 November 2009)

Grand Slam singles results
- Australian Open: 1R (2006)
- French Open: Q2 (2007, 2010)
- Wimbledon: Q3 (2007)
- US Open: 2R (2005)

Doubles
- Career record: 10–15
- Career titles: 1
- Highest ranking: No. 213 (2 November 2009)

Team competitions
- Davis Cup: W (2014)

Michael Lammer (born 25 March 1982) is a retired Swiss professional tennis player. At the 2009 Allianz Suisse Open in Gstaad, he won the doubles tournament with compatriot Marco Chiudinelli. It was his only ATP tour title.

== Early life and junior career ==
Lammer was born on 25 March 1982 to parents Ernst and Susi, and started playing tennis at the age of six.

As a junior, he was ranked as high as No. 7 in the world singles rankings in May 2000 (and No. 12 in doubles).

== Professional career ==
In 2009 in Gstaad, Lammer won his first ATP tour title with fellow Swiss player Marco Chiudinelli. Having been granted a wildcard into the doubles draw, they managed to reach the final. There, they defeated the No. 1 seeds Jaroslav Levinský and Filip Polášek 7–5, 6–3. It was Lammer's first ATP final, and his first title.

Lammer represented Switzerland in the 2014 Davis Cup World Group 1R, partnering with Marco Chiudinelli to win 3–2 over Serbia. His doubles victory with Chiudinelli clinched the first round victory over Serbia, allowing Switzerland to advance to the quarterfinals for the first time since 2004. Switzerland went on to win its first Davis Cup in history.

== Retirement ==
Lammer retired in March 2015, after playing a doubles match with Roger Federer in Indian Wells. Subsequently, he became a coach of the Swiss Under 14s tennis team.

== Playing style ==
Lammer is right-handed and plays with a single-handed backhand. He prefers to run around his backhand in favour of a forehand, especially on clay when given more time.

Lammer cites Stefan Edberg, Pete Sampras and Roger Federer as his tennis idols.

== ATP career finals ==
=== Doubles: 1 (1–0) ===
Legend
Grand Slam Tournaments (0–0)
ATP World Tour Finals (0–0)
ATP World Tour Masters 1000 (0–0)
ATP World Tour 500 Series (0–0)
ATP World Tour 250 Series (1–0)

Result	W/L	Date	Tournament	Surface	Partner	Opponents	Score
Win	1–0	Aug 2009	Gstaad, Switzerland	Clay	(Switzerland) Marco Chiudinelli	(Czech Republic) Jaroslav Levinský (Slovakia) Filip Polášek	7–5, 6–3

== National representation ==
=== Davis Cup (4 wins, 9 losses) ===
Group membership World Group (1–6) WG Play-off (2–2) Group I (1–1) Group II (0–0) Group III (0) Group IV (0)	Matches by surface Hard (4–6) Clay (0–3) Grass (0–0) Carpet (0–0)	Matches by Type Singles (1–8) Doubles (3–1)	Matches by Setting Indoors (4–8) Outdoors (0–1)	Matches by Venue Switzerland (3–4) Away (1–5)

- ▲ ▼ indicates the result of the Davis Cup match followed by the score, date, place of event, the zonal classification and its phase, and the court surface.

Rubber result	No.	Rubber	Match type (partner if any)	Opponent nation	Opponent player(s)	Score
▼2–3; 10–12 February 2006; SEG Geneva Arena, Geneva, Switzerland; World Group First Round; Clay(i) surface
Defeat	1	I	Singles	Australia	Peter Luczak	6–1, 3–6, 0–6, 3–6
▲4–1; 8–10 February 2008; Bodensee-Arena, Kreuzlingen, Switzerland; Europe/Africa Group First Round; Hard(i) surface
Victory	2	III	Doubles (with Yves Allegro)	Poland	Mariusz Fyrstenberg / Marcin Matkowski	6–4, 6–3, 2–6, 6–3
Defeat	3	IV	Singles (dead rubber)	Poland	Dawid Olejniczak	6–3, 2–2 retired
▲3–2; 18–20 September 2009; Centro Sportivo "Valletta Cambiaso", Genoa, Italy; World Group play-offs; Clay surface
Defeat	4	V	Singles (dead rubber)	Italy	Fabio Fognini	5–7, 6–7^{(4–7)}
▼0–5; 17–19 September 2010; National Tennis Centre, Astana, Kazakhstan; World Group play-offs; Hard(i) surface
Defeat	5	IV	Singles (dead rubber)	Kazakhstan	Andrey Golubev	3–6, 2–6
▼0–5; 10–12 February 2012; Forum Fribourg, Fribourg, Switzerland; World Group First Round; Clay(i) surface
Defeat	6	IV	Singles (dead rubber)	United States	Ryan Harrison	6–7^{(0–7)}, 6–7^{(4–7)}
▲4–1; 13–15 September 2013; Patinoire du Littoral, Neuchâtel, Switzerland; World Group play-offs; Hard(i) surface
Victory	7	III	Doubles (with Stan Wawrinka)	Ecuador	Emilio Gómez / Roberto Quiroz	6–3, 6–4, 3–6, 6–7^{(7–9)}, 6–4
Victory	8	IV	Singles (dead rubber)	Ecuador	Roberto Quiroz	6–3, 2–6, 6–2
▲3–2; 31 January – 2 February 2014; SPENS, Novi Sad, Serbia; World Group First Round; Hard(i) surface
Victory	9	III	Doubles (with Marco Chiudinelli)	Serbia	Filip Krajinović / Nenad Zimonjić	7–6^{(9–7)}, 3–6, 7–6^{(7–2)}, 6–2
Defeat	10	IV	Singles (dead rubber)	Serbia	Dušan Lajović	3–6, 6–3, 4–6
▲3–2; 12–14 September 2014; Palexpo, Geneva, Switzerland; World Group Semifinal; Hard(i) surface
Defeat	11	V	Singles (dead rubber)	Italy	Andreas Seppi	4–6, 6–1, 4–6
▼2–3; 6–8 March 2015; Country Hall du Sart Tilman, Liège, Belgium; World Group First Round; Hard(i) surface
Defeat	12	II	Singles	Belgium	Steve Darcis	3–6, 1–6, 3–6
Defeat	13	III	Doubles (with Adrien Bossel)	Belgium	Ruben Bemelmans / Niels Desein	6–1, 3–6, 2–6, 2–6

==== Wins: 1 ====
Edition	(Switzerland) Swiss Team	Rounds/Opponents
2014 Davis Cup	Roger Federer; Stanislas Wawrinka; Michael Lammer; Marco Chiudinelli	1R: SUI 3–2 SRB; QF: SUI 3–2 KAZ; SF: SUI 3–2 ITA; F: SUI 3–1 FRA
