= 2019 MercedesCup =

Tennis tournament in Stuttgart, Germany

- Date: 10–16 June
- Edition: 42nd
- Category: ATP Tour 250
- Draw: 28S / 16D
- Prize money: €679,015
- Surface: Grass
- Location: Stuttgart, Germany
- Venue: Tennis Club Weissenhof

Champions

Singles
- (Italy) Matteo Berrettini

Doubles
- (Australia) John Peers / (Brazil) Bruno Soares
← 2018 ·	Stuttgart Open	· 2021 →

The 2019 MercedesCup was a men's tennis tournament to be played on outdoor grass courts. It was the 42nd edition of the Stuttgart Open, and part of the ATP Tour 250 series of the 2019 ATP Tour. It was held at the Tennis Club Weissenhof in Stuttgart, Germany, from 10 June until 16 June 2019. Unseeded Matteo Berrettini won the singles title.

== Finals ==
=== Singles ===
- (Italy) Matteo Berrettini defeated (Canada) Félix Auger-Aliassime, 6–4, 7–6^{(13–11)}

=== Doubles ===
- (Australia) John Peers / (Brazil) Bruno Soares defeated (India) Rohan Bopanna / (Canada) Denis Shapovalov, 7–5, 6–3

== ATP singles main draw entrants ==
=== Seeds ===
Country	Player	Rank^{1}	Seed
GER	Alexander Zverev	5	1
RUS	Karen Khachanov	11	2
RUS	Daniil Medvedev	14	3
GEO	Nikoloz Basilashvili	16	4
FRA	Gaël Monfils	17	5
CAN	Milos Raonic	18	6
CAN	Félix Auger-Aliassime	22	7
CAN	Denis Shapovalov	24	8

- ^{1} Rankings are as of May 27, 2019.

=== Other entrants ===
The following players received wildcards into the main draw:

- (France) Lucas Pouille
- (Germany) Alexander Zverev
- (Germany) Mischa Zverev

The following player received entry using a protected ranking into the main draw:

- (France) Jo-Wilfried Tsonga

The following players received entry from the qualifying draw:

- (Germany) Dustin Brown
- (Croatia) Viktor Galović
- (Spain) Feliciano López
- (Australia) Alexei Popyrin

=== Withdrawals ===
Before the tournament

- (Spain) Pablo Carreño Busta → replaced by (United States) Steve Johnson
- (Serbia) Laslo Đere → replaced by (Germany) Peter Gojowczyk
- (Switzerland) Stan Wawrinka → replaced by (Serbia) Miomir Kecmanović

During the tournament

- (Canada) Milos Raonic

== ATP doubles main draw entrants ==
=== Seeds ===
Country	Player	Country	Player	Rank^{1}	Seed
AUS	John Peers	BRA	Bruno Soares	26	1
CRO	Nikola Mektić	CRO	Franko Škugor	27	2
USA	Bob Bryan	USA	Mike Bryan	35	3
AUT	Oliver Marach	AUT	Jürgen Melzer	85	4

- ^{1} Rankings are as of May 27, 2019.

=== Other entrants ===
The following pairs received wildcards into the doubles main draw:

- (Germany) Andre Begemann / (Germany) Dustin Brown
- (France) Lucas Pouille / (France) Jo-Wilfried Tsonga

The following pair received entry as alternates:

- (Italy) Matteo Berrettini / (Hungary) Márton Fucsovics

=== Withdrawals ===
Before the tournament

- (Poland) Hubert Hurkacz
