= 2018 Challenger Banque Nationale de Drummondville – Singles =

Singles
- 2018 Challenger Banque Nationale de Drummondville

Final
- Champion: (United States) Denis Kudla
- Runner-up: (France) Benjamin Bonzi
- Score: 6–0, 7–5

Events
Singles	Doubles
← 2017 ·	Challenger de Drummondville	· 2019 →

Denis Shapovalov was the defending champion but chose not to defend his title.

Denis Kudla won the title after defeating Benjamin Bonzi 6–0, 7–5 in the final.

== Seeds ==
1. (Canada) Vasek Pospisil (semifinals)
2. (Switzerland) Henri Laaksonen (second round)
3. (France) Gleb Sakharov (first round, retired)
4. (United Kingdom) Liam Broady (first round)
5. (United States) Denis Kudla (champion)
6. (Canada) Filip Peliwo (second round)
7. (United States) Evan King (quarterfinals)
8. (Canada) Brayden Schnur (semifinals)

== Draw ==
=== Key ===
- Q = Qualifier
- WC = Wild card
- LL = Lucky loser
- Alt = Alternate
- SE = Special exempt
- PR = Protected ranking
- ITF = ITF entry
- JE = Junior exempt
- w/o = Walkover
- r = Retired
- d = Defaulted
- SR = Special ranking

=== Finals ===
Semifinals
1	(Canada) Vasek Pospisil	5	6	1
(France) Benjamin Bonzi	7	3	6
8	(Canada) Brayden Schnur	4	2
5	(United States) Denis Kudla	6	6

Final
(France) Benjamin Bonzi	0	5
5	(United States) Denis Kudla	6	7

=== Top half ===
First round
1	(Canada) V Pospisil	7	6
(Croatia) A Pavić	5	3
WC	(Canada) B Sigouin	1	6	4
Alt	(South Africa) N Scholtz	6	2	6
WC	(Canada) Pavel Krainik	6	5	2
(Germany) D Köpfer	3	7	6
Q	(Australia) A Vukic	6^{1}	4
7	(United States) E King	7^{7}	6
4	(United Kingdom) L Broady	6	4	6^{3}
LL	(United States) JC Aragone	4	6	7^{7}
WC	(Canada) Samuel Monette	6	6
Q	(South Africa) R Roelofse	3	4
(France) B Bonzi	6	5	7
(France) V Millot	4	7	5
Alt	(Colombia) A González	3	6	3
6	(Canada) F Peliwo	6	4	6

Second round
1	(Canada) V Pospisil	7^{7}	7
Alt	(South Africa) N Scholtz	6^{2}	5
(Germany) D Köpfer	4	6^{6}
7	(United States) E King	6	7^{8}
LL	(United States) JC Aragone	7	6
WC	(Canada) S Monette	5	4
(France) B Bonzi	6	7^{7}
6	(Canada) F Peliwo	4	6^{3}

Quarterfinals
1	(Canada) V Pospisil	7^{7}	6
7	(United States) E King	6^{4}	4
LL	(United States) JC Aragone	7^{7}	2	0
(France) B Bonzi	6^{5}	6	6

Semifinals
1	(Canada) V Pospisil	5	6	1
(France) B Bonzi	7	3	6

=== Bottom half ===
First round
8	(Canada) B Schnur	7^{7}	6
PR	(Poland) M Przysiężny	6^{3}	2
(United States) C Harrison	6	6^{5}	7^{7}
(Australia) J-P Smith	0	7^{7}	6^{4}
WC	(Canada) JM Lin	5	1
PR	(Canada) F Dancevic	7	6
(France) C Lestienne	6	0
3	(France) G Sakharov	3	0^{r}
5	(United States) D Kudla	1	6	6
Q	(France) A Escoffier	6	3	4
(Croatia) F Škugor	6	3	3^{r}
Alt	(Belgium) J De Loore	3	6	4
(Spain) N Kuhn	4	3
LL	(United States) Jared Hiltzik	6	6
Q	(Colombia) A Gómez	4	5
2	(Switzerland) H Laaksonen	6	7

Second round
8	(Canada) B Schnur	6	6
(United States) C Harrison	4	3
PR	(Canada) F Dancevic	7^{8}	6
(France) C Lestienne	6^{6}	2
5	(United States) D Kudla	6	5	6
Alt	(Belgium) J De Loore	3	7	2
LL	(United States) J Hiltzik	6	6
2	(Switzerland) H Laaksonen	4	4

Quarterfinals
8	(Canada) B Schnur	w/o
PR	(Canada) F Dancevic
5	(United States) D Kudla	6	6
LL	(United States) J Hiltzik	2	1

Semifinals
8	(Canada) B Schnur	4	2
5	(United States) D Kudla	6	6
