= 2016 Challenger Banque Nationale de Drummondville – Singles =

Singles
- 2016 Challenger Banque Nationale de Drummondville

Final
- Champion: (United Kingdom) Daniel Evans
- Runner-up: (United Kingdom) Edward Corrie
- Score: 6–3, 6–4

Events
Singles	Doubles
← 2015 ·	Challenger de Drummondville	· 2017 →

John-Patrick Smith was the defending champion, but decided not to participate this year.

Daniel Evans won the title, defeating Edward Corrie 6–3, 6–4 in the final.

== Seeds ==
1. (Japan) Yūichi Sugita (first round)
2. (United States) Austin Krajicek (second round)
3. (Netherlands) Igor Sijsling (second round)
4. (United Kingdom) Daniel Evans (champion)
5. (Argentina) Renzo Olivo (quarterfinals, retired)
6. (Belgium) Yannick Mertens (second round)
7. (United States) Tommy Paul (first round)
8. (United States) Daniel Nguyen (first round)

== Draw ==
=== Key ===
- Q = Qualifier
- WC = Wild card
- LL = Lucky loser
- Alt = Alternate
- SE = Special exempt
- PR = Protected ranking
- ITF = ITF entry
- JE = Junior exempt
- w/o = Walkover
- r = Retired
- d = Defaulted
- SR = Special ranking

=== Finals ===
Semifinals
LL	(United Kingdom) Edward Corrie	6	6
Q	(Netherlands) Tim van Rijthoven	3	4
4	(United Kingdom) Daniel Evans	4	7^{7}	6
WC	(Canada) Denis Shapovalov	6	6^{5}	4

Final
LL	(United Kingdom) Edward Corrie	3	4
4	(United Kingdom) Daniel Evans	6	6

=== Top half ===
First round
1	(Japan) Y Sugita	4	4
(Canada) F Dancevic	6	6
Alt	(Australia) B Mott	4	2
Q	(Chile) N Jarry	6	6
LL	(United Kingdom) E Corrie	6	6
Alt	(United States) D Baughman	2	4
(United States) M Krueger	6	4	6
8	(United States) D Nguyen	4	6	2
3	(Netherlands) I Sijsling	3	6	6
(United States) E Quigley	6	3	4
WC	(Canada) P Polansky	6	3	6
Q	(France) H Nys	4	6	4
Q	(Netherlands) T van Rijthoven	3	7^{8}	6
(Australia) B Mitchell	6	6^{6}	2
(United Kingdom) L Broady	7^{7}	1	4
6	(Belgium) Y Mertens	6^{5}	6	6

Second round
(Canada) F Dancevic	7^{7}	6
Q	(Chile) N Jarry	6^{4}	3
LL	(United Kingdom) E Corrie	6	6
(United States) M Krueger	4	2
3	(Netherlands) I Sijsling	2	6	5
WC	(Canada) P Polansky	6	2	7
Q	(Netherlands) T van Rijthoven	3	6	6
6	(Belgium) Y Mertens	6	4	4

Quarterfinals
(Canada) F Dancevic	3	4
LL	(United Kingdom) E Corrie	6	6
WC	(Canada) P Polansky	6	5	1
Q	(Netherlands) T van Rijthoven	4	7	6

Semifinals
LL	(United Kingdom) E Corrie	6	6
Q	(Netherlands) T van Rijthoven	3	4

=== Bottom half ===
First round
7	(United States) T Paul	3	4
(Canada) P Bester	6	6
(Australia) O Jasika	6	1	0
(Spain) R Ortega Olmedo	1	6	6
Alt	(Slovakia) F Horanský	6	2
(Belgium) G Gigounon	2	0^{r}
(Australia) M Barton	6	2	3
4	(United Kingdom) D Evans	1	6	6
5	(Argentina) R Olivo	6	1	7
(United States) S Kozlov	3	6	5
(Belgium) Y Reuter	6	6
Q	(United States) Winston Lin	4	3
WC	(Canada) D Shapovalov	6	3	6
WC	(Canada) F Peliwo	2	6	1
Alt	(United States) E King	6^{3}	1
2	(United States) A Krajicek	7^{7}	6

Second round
(Canada) P Bester	6	7^{7}
(Spain) R Ortega Olmedo	3	6^{4}
Alt	(Slovakia) F Horanský	0	3
4	(United Kingdom) D Evans	6	6
5	(Argentina) R Olivo	6	7
(Belgium) Y Reuter	4	5
WC	(Canada) D Shapovalov	6	7
2	(United States) A Krajicek	3	5

Quarterfinals
(Canada) P Bester	3	6^{3}
4	(United Kingdom) D Evans	6	7^{7}
5	(Argentina) R Olivo	6^{2^{r}}
WC	(Canada) D Shapovalov	6^{3}

Semifinals
4	(United Kingdom) D Evans	4	7^{7}	6
WC	(Canada) D Shapovalov	6	6^{5}	4
