= 2018 Challenger Banque Nationale de Drummondville – Doubles =

Tennis tournament event

Doubles
- 2018 Challenger Banque Nationale de Drummondville

Final
- Champions: (Belgium) Joris De Loore (Denmark) Frederik Nielsen
- Runners-up: (Venezuela) Luis David Martínez (Canada) Filip Peliwo
- Score: 6–4, 6–3

Events
Singles	Doubles
← 2017 ·	Challenger de Drummondville	· 2019 →

Sam Groth and Adil Shamasdin were the defending champions but only Shamasdin chose to defend his title, partnering Frank Dancevic. Dancevic and Shamasdin withdrew in the semifinals.

Joris De Loore and Frederik Nielsen won the title after defeating Luis David Martínez and Filip Peliwo 6–4, 6–3 in the final.

== Seeds ==
1. (Australia) Matt Reid / (Australia) John-Patrick Smith (first round)
2. (United Kingdom) Luke Bambridge / (United Kingdom) Joe Salisbury (first round)
3. (United States) Evan King / (United States) Nathan Pasha (first round)
4. (Croatia) Ante Pavić / (Croatia) Franko Škugor (quarterfinals)

== Draw ==
=== Key ===
- Q = Qualifier
- WC = Wild card
- LL = Lucky loser
- Alt = Alternate
- ITF = ITF entry
- PR = Protected ranking
- SR = Special ranking
- SE = Special exempt
- JE = Junior exempt
- JR = Junior Accelerator Programme entrant
- CO = College Accelerator Programme entrant
- NG = Next Gen Accelerator Program entrant
- w/o = Walkover
- r = Retired
- d = Defaulted

First round
1	(Australia) M Reid (Australia) J-P Smith	6^{2}	6	[3]
(United Kingdom) L Broady (South Africa) R Roelofse	7^{7}	3	[10]
WC	(Canada) Samuel Monette (Canada) B Schnur
(Venezuela) LD Martínez (Canada) F Peliwo	w/o
4	(Croatia) A Pavić (Croatia) F Škugor	5	6	[10]
(France) B Bonzi (France) G Jacq	7	4	[8]
(United States) N Lammons (United States) A Lawson	6	7^{7}
WC	(Canada) T Baadi (Canada) Chih Chi Huang	3	6^{3}
WC	(Canada) J Boulais (Canada) Pavel Krainik	6^{7}	6^{5}
(Colombia) A González (Spain) N Kuhn	7^{9}	7^{7}
PR	(Canada) F Dancevic (Canada) A Shamasdin	6	6
3	(United States) E King (United States) N Pasha	1	4
(Philippines) R Gonzales (United States) H Reese	6	6
Alt	(France) A Escoffier (France) H Grenier	2	4
(Belgium) J De Loore (Denmark) F Nielsen	5	6	[10]
2	(United Kingdom) L Bambridge (United Kingdom) J Salisbury	7	4	[8]

Quarterfinals
(United Kingdom) L Broady (South Africa) R Roelofse	3	5
(Venezuela) LD Martínez (Canada) F Peliwo	6	7
4	(Croatia) A Pavić (Croatia) F Škugor	2	7^{7}	[6]
(United States) N Lammons (United States) A Lawson	6	6^{5}	[10]
(Colombia) A González (Spain) N Kuhn	6	5	[8]
PR	(Canada) F Dancevic (Canada) A Shamasdin	4	7	[10]
(Philippines) R Gonzales (United States) H Reese	4	3
(Belgium) J De Loore (Denmark) F Nielsen	6	6

Semifinals
(Venezuela) LD Martínez (Canada) F Peliwo	6^{4}	6	[10]
(United States) N Lammons (United States) A Lawson	7^{7}	4	[8]
PR	(Canada) F Dancevic (Canada) A Shamasdin
(Belgium) J De Loore (Denmark) F Nielsen	w/o

Final
(Venezuela) LD Martínez (Canada) F Peliwo	4	3
(Belgium) J De Loore (Denmark) F Nielsen	6	6
