= 2021 MercedesCup – Singles =

Singles
- 2021 MercedesCup

Final
- Champion: (Croatia) Marin Čilić
- Runner-up: (Canada) Félix Auger-Aliassime
- Score: 7–6^{(7–2)}, 6–3

Details
- Draw: 28
- Seeds: 8

Events
Singles	Doubles
← 2019 ·	Stuttgart Open	· 2022 →

Marin Čilić defeated Félix Auger-Aliassime in the final, 7–6^{(7–2)}, 6–3 to win the singles tennis title at the 2021 Stuttgart Open. It was Čilić's 19th career ATP Tour singles title, his first in three years, and he did not drop a set en route to the victory. The No. 47-ranked, 32-year-old Čilić also became the lowest-ranked winner since Juan Carlos Ferrero in 2011 and the third-oldest champion in tournament history. Defending finalist Auger-Aliassime was contesting for his first career singles title in his eighth final.

Matteo Berrettini was the reigning champion from when the event was last held in 2019, but he could not participate as he was still competing at the French Open upon the beginning of the tournament.

== Seeds ==
The top four seeds received a bye into the second round.

1. (Canada) Denis Shapovalov (quarterfinals)
2. (Poland) Hubert Hurkacz (second round)
3. (Canada) Félix Auger-Aliassime (final)
4. (Australia) Alex de Minaur (quarterfinals)
5. (Georgia (country)) Nikoloz Basilashvili (second round)
6. (France) Ugo Humbert (quarterfinals)
7. (France) Adrian Mannarino (first round)
8. (Australia) John Millman (withdrew)

== Draw ==
=== Key ===
- Q = Qualifier
- WC = Wild card
- LL = Lucky loser
- Alt = Alternate
- SE = Special exempt
- PR = Protected ranking
- ITF = ITF entry
- JE = Junior exempt
- w/o = Walkover
- r = Retired
- d = Defaulted
- SR = Special ranking

=== Finals ===
Semifinals
(Croatia) Marin Čilić	6	1
WC	(Austria) Jurij Rodionov	3	0^{r}
3	(Canada) Félix Auger-Aliassime	6	7
(United States) Sam Querrey	4	5

Final
(Croatia) Marin Čilić	7^{7}	6
3	(Canada) Félix Auger-Aliassime	6^{2}	3

=== Top half ===
First round
(Spain) F López	6	6
(Australia) A Popyrin	4	4
(Croatia) M Čilić	7	6
WC	(Germany) R Molleker	5	3
WC	(Germany) D Brown	3	6^{4}
5	(Georgia (country)) N Basilashvili	6	7^{7}
(Argentina) G Pella	3	4
(Australia) J Thompson	6	6
(Germany) D Koepfer	6	3	2
WC	(Austria) J Rodionov	2	6	6
Q	(Germany) P Gojowczyk	5	6	6
LL	(Belarus) I Ivashka	7	4	2

Second round
1	(Canada) D Shapovalov	6	6^{2}	6
(Spain) F López	2	7^{7}	3
(Croatia) M Čilić	6	6
5	(Georgia (country)) N Basilashvili	3	2
4	(Australia) A de Minaur	6^{8}	6	6
(Australia) J Thompson	7^{10}	3	4
WC	(Austria) J Rodionov	5
Q	(Germany) P Gojowczyk	3^{r}

Quarterfinals
1	(Canada) D Shapovalov	5	6^{3}
(Croatia) M Čilić	7	7^{7}
4	(Australia) A de Minaur	6	3	6^{4}
WC	(Austria) J Rodionov	3	6	7^{7}

Semifinals
(Croatia) M Čilić	6	1
WC	(Austria) J Rodionov	3	0^{r}

=== Bottom half ===
First round
6	(France) U Humbert	6	6
(Hungary) M Fucsovics	3	1
(France) J Chardy	4	4
WC	(Germany) Y Hanfmann	6	6
(France) G Simon	4	5
(South Africa) L Harris	6	7
7	(France) A Mannarino	3	2
Q	(Australia) J Duckworth	6	6
Q	(Turkey) A Çelikbilek	4	1
(United States) S Querrey	6	6
Q	(Moldova) R Albot	6^{4}	6^{5}
WC	(Switzerland) DS Stricker	7^{7}	7^{7}

Second round
6	(France) U Humbert	7^{11}	6
WC	(Germany) Y Hanfmann	6^{9}	2
(South Africa) L Harris	3	6^{4}
3	(Canada) F Auger-Aliassime	6	7^{7}
Q	(Australia) J Duckworth	4	6^{7}
(United States) S Querrey	6	7^{9}
WC	(Switzerland) DS Stricker	7^{7}	7^{7}
2	(Poland) H Hurkacz	6^{5}	6^{5}

Quarterfinals
6	(France) U Humbert	6^{5}	6^{8}
3	(Canada) F Auger-Aliassime	7^{7}	7^{10}
(United States) S Querrey	6^{4}	7^{7}	6
WC	(Switzerland) DS Stricker	7^{7}	6^{4}	3

Semifinals
3	(Canada) F Auger-Aliassime	6	7
(United States) S Querrey	4	5

== Qualifying ==
=== Seeds ===
1. (United States) Sam Querrey (moved to main draw)
2. (France) Gilles Simon (moved to main draw)
3. (Czech Republic) Jiří Veselý (first round)
4. (Finland) Emil Ruusuvuori (qualifying competition)
5. (United States) Marcos Giron (first round)
6. (France) Lucas Pouille (first round)
7. (Moldova) Radu Albot (qualified)
8. (Belarus) Ilya Ivashka (qualifying competition, lucky loser)

=== Qualifiers ===
1. (Australia) James Duckworth
2. (Germany) Peter Gojowczyk
3. (Turkey) Altuğ Çelikbilek
4. (Moldova) Radu Albot

=== Lucky loser ===
1. (Belarus) Ilya Ivashka

=== Draw ===
==== First qualifier ====
First round
Alt	(Australia) Luke Saville	7^{8}	4	4
Alt	(Australia) James Duckworth	6^{6}	6	6
WC	(Germany) Daniel Masur	0	6^{4}
8	(Belarus) Ilya Ivashka	6	7^{7}

Qualifying competition
Alt	(Australia) James Duckworth	7^{7}	3	7
8	(Belarus) Ilya Ivashka	6^{5}	6	5

==== Second qualifier ====
First round
Alt	(Ukraine) Sergiy Stakhovsky	1	6^{4}
Alt	(Germany) Peter Gojowczyk	6	7^{7}
Alt	(France) Grégoire Barrère	6	6
5	(United States) Marcos Giron	3	2

Qualifying competition
Alt	(Germany) Peter Gojowczyk	6	6
Alt	(France) Grégoire Barrère	2	4

==== Third qualifier ====
First round
3	(Czech Republic) Jiří Veselý	7^{7}	2	4
Alt	(Austria) Dennis Novak	6^{5}	6	6
Alt	(Turkey) Altuğ Çelikbilek	6	2	6
6	(France) Lucas Pouille	3	6	3

Qualifying competition
Alt	(Austria) Dennis Novak	6	6^{3}	5
Alt	(Turkey) Altuğ Çelikbilek	1	7^{7}	7

==== Fourth qualifier ====
First round
4	(Finland) Emil Ruusuvuori	7	6
Alt	(Portugal) João Sousa	5	3
Alt	(Australia) Christopher O'Connell	3	0^{r}
7	(Moldova) Radu Albot	6	0

Qualifying competition
4	(Finland) Emil Ruusuvuori	6^{5}	4
7	(Moldova) Radu Albot	7^{7}	6
