= 2018 MercedesCup – Singles =

Singles
- 2018 MercedesCup

Final
- Champion: (Switzerland) Roger Federer
- Runner-up: (Canada) Milos Raonic
- Score: 6–4, 7–6^{(7–3)}

Details
- Draw: 28 (4 Q / 3 WC )
- Seeds: 8

Events
Singles	Doubles
- Stuttgart Open

Lucas Pouille was the defending champion, but lost in the semifinals to Milos Raonic.

First-seeded Roger Federer won his first title in Stuttgart, defeating Raonic in the final, 6–4, 7–6^{(7–3)}. By reaching the final, Federer regained the ATP no. 1 singles ranking. This was his record extending 18th grass court title and his final ATP 250 title before retiring in 2022.

== Seeds ==
The top four seeds receive a bye into the second round.

1. (Switzerland) Roger Federer (champion)
2. (France) Lucas Pouille (semifinals)
3. (Czech Republic) Tomáš Berdych (quarterfinals)
4. (Australia) Nick Kyrgios (semifinals)
5. (Germany) Philipp Kohlschreiber (first round)
6. (Canada) Denis Shapovalov (first round)
7. (Canada) Milos Raonic (final)
8. (Spain) Feliciano López (quarterfinals)

== Draw ==
Key

- Q = Qualifier
- WC = Wild card
- LL = Lucky loser
- Alt = Alternate
- ITF = ITF entry
- PR = Protected ranking
- SR = Special ranking
- SE = Special exempt
- JE = Junior exempt
- JR = Junior Accelerator Programme entrant
- CO = College Accelerator Programme entrant
- NG = Next Gen Accelerator Program entrant
- w/o = Walkover
- r = Retired
- d = Defaulted

=== Finals ===
Semifinals
1	(Switzerland) Roger Federer	6^{2}	6	7^{7}
4	(Australia) Nick Kyrgios	7^{7}	2	6^{5}
7	(Canada) Milos Raonic	6	7^{7}
2	(France) Lucas Pouille	4	6^{3}

Final
1	(Switzerland) Roger Federer	6	7^{7}
7	(Canada) Milos Raonic	4	6^{3}

=== Top half ===
First round
Q	(Russia) M Youzhny	6^{5}	3
(Germany) M Zverev	7^{7}	6
(Argentina) G Pella	6	6
(Australia) J Millman	2	2
Q	(India) P Gunneswaran	7^{8}	2	6
6	(Canada) D Shapovalov	6^{6}	6	3
(Germany) M Marterer	3	6	6
LL	(Croatia) V Galović	6	4	1
(France) G Simon	6	6
Q	(Italy) M Viola	0	3
(Serbia) V Troicki	1	0^{r}
8	(Spain) F López	6	0

Second round
1	(Switzerland) R Federer	3	6	6
(Germany) M Zverev	6	4	2
(Argentina) G Pella	7^{7}	6
Q	(India) P Gunneswaran	6^{4}	3
4	(Australia) N Kyrgios	6	4	6
(Germany) M Marterer	4	6	3
(France) G Simon	6^{6}	4
8	(Spain) F López	7^{8}	6

Quarterfinals
1	(Switzerland) R Federer	6	6
(Argentina) G Pella	4	4
4	(Australia) N Kyrgios	6	3	6
8	(Spain) F López	4	6	3

Semifinals
1	(Switzerland) R Federer	6^{2}	6	7^{7}
4	(Australia) N Kyrgios	7^{7}	2	6^{5}

=== Bottom half ===
First round
7	(Canada) M Raonic	7^{10}	6
(Bosnia and Herzegovina) M Bašić	6^{8}	2
(Hungary) M Fucsovics	6	6
Q	(United States) D Kudla	3	4
(France) B Paire	6^{4}	6	6
(United States) T Fritz	7^{7}	3	2
5	(Germany) P Kohlschreiber	6^{2}	6^{3}
(Uzbekistan) D Istomin	7^{7}	7^{7}
(Germany) F Mayer	6	6
WC	(Germany) Y Maden	4	1
WC	(Germany) R Molleker	6	6^{5}	6
(Germany) J-L Struff	4	7^{7}	3

Second round
7	(Canada) M Raonic	6	6
(Hungary) M Fucsovics	2	4
(France) B Paire	6^{3}	4
3	(Czech Republic) T Berdych	7^{7}	6
(Uzbekistan) D Istomin	6	6
(Germany) F Mayer	3	4
WC	(Germany) R Molleker	3	4
2	(France) L Pouille	6	6

Quarterfinals
7	(Canada) M Raonic	7^{7}	7^{7}
3	(Czech Republic) T Berdych	6^{2}	6^{1}
(Uzbekistan) D Istomin	4	7^{7}	3
2	(France) L Pouille	6	6^{5}	6

Semifinals
7	(Canada) M Raonic	6	7^{7}
2	(France) L Pouille	4	6^{3}

== Qualifying ==
=== Seeds ===
1. (Russia) Mikhail Youzhny (qualified)
2. (Slovakia) Lukáš Lacko (first round)
3. (Belgium) Ruben Bemelmans (first round)
4. (United States) Denis Kudla (qualified)
5. (Germany) Matthias Bachinger (first round)
6. (Slovakia) Andrej Martin (first round)
7. (Croatia) Viktor Galović (qualifying competition, lucky loser)
8. (India) Prajnesh Gunneswaran (qualified)

=== Qualifiers ===
1. (Russia) Mikhail Youzhny
2. (Italy) Matteo Viola
3. (India) Prajnesh Gunneswaran
4. (United States) Denis Kudla

=== Lucky loser ===
1. (Croatia) Viktor Galović

=== Qualifying draw ===
==== First qualifier ====
First round
1	(Russia) Mikhail Youzhny	6	6
(France) David Guez	2	3
PR	(Belarus) Egor Gerasimov	7^{7}	6
5	(Germany) Matthias Bachinger	6^{5}	4

Qualifying competition
1	(Russia) Mikhail Youzhny	6	6
PR	(Belarus) Egor Gerasimov	3	2

==== Second qualifier ====
First round
2	(Slovakia) Lukáš Lacko	7^{7}	5	1
WC	(Germany) Tim Pütz	6^{3}	7	6
(Italy) Matteo Viola	6	6
6	(Slovakia) Andrej Martin	4	3

Qualifying competition
WC	(Germany) Tim Pütz	3	6^{1}
(Italy) Matteo Viola	6	7^{7}

==== Third qualifier ====
First round
3	(Belgium) Ruben Bemelmans	5	6^{4}
(United States) Christian Harrison	7	7^{7}
(United States) Evan King	1	4
8	(India) Prajnesh Gunneswaran	6	6

Qualifying competition
(United States) Christian Harrison	3	6	3
8	(India) Prajnesh Gunneswaran	6	4	6

==== Fourth qualifier ====
First round
4	(United States) Denis Kudla	7^{7}	6
(Germany) Jan Choinski	6^{4}	3
WC	(Germany) Philipp Petzschner	1	4
7	(Croatia) Viktor Galović	6	6

Qualifying competition
4	(United States) Denis Kudla	3	6	6
7	(Croatia) Viktor Galović	6	4	3
