= 2016 Challenger Banque Nationale de Drummondville – Doubles =

Doubles
- 2016 Challenger Banque Nationale de Drummondville

Final
- Champions: (United States) James Cerretani (United States) Max Schnur
- Runners-up: (United Kingdom) Daniel Evans (United Kingdom) Lloyd Glasspool
- Score: 3–6, 6–3, [11–9]

Events
Singles	Doubles
- Challenger de Drummondville

Philip Bester and Chris Guccione were the defending champions, but Guccione decided not to participate this year. Bester partnered with Peter Polansky, but lost in the quarterfinals to Daniel Evans and Lloyd Glasspool.

James Cerretani and Max Schnur won the title, defeating Evans and Glasspool 3–6, 6–3, [11–9] in the final.

== Seeds ==
1. (Canada) Philip Bester / (Canada) Peter Polansky (quarterfinals)
2. (United States) James Cerretani / (United States) Max Schnur (champions)
3. (France) Hugo Nys / (Argentina) Renzo Olivo (semifinals, withdrew)
4. (United States) Mitchell Krueger / (United Kingdom) Darren Walsh (withdrew)

== Draw ==
Key

- Q = Qualifier
- WC = Wild card
- LL = Lucky loser
- Alt = Alternate
- ITF = ITF entry
- PR = Protected ranking
- SR = Special ranking
- SE = Special exempt
- JE = Junior exempt
- JR = Junior Accelerator Programme entrant
- CO = College Accelerator Programme entrant
- NG = Next Gen Accelerator Program entrant
- w/o = Walkover
- r = Retired
- d = Defaulted

=== Draw ===
First round
1	(Canada) P Bester (Canada) P Polansky	7	6
(Belgium) Y Mertens (Netherlands) I Sijsling	5	1
(United Kingdom) D Evans (United Kingdom) L Glasspool	6	6
WC	(Canada) JM Lin (Canada) Joshua Peck	1	0
Alt	(South Africa) Keith-Patrick Crowley (United States) S Kozlov	5	7	[10]
(Australia) O Jasika (Australia) B Mott	7	5	[6]
WC	(Canada) A Galarneau (Canada) Nicaise Muamba	2	1
WC	(Canada) D Shapovalov (Netherlands) T van Rijthoven	6	6
(United States) D Baughman (United States) E Quigley	6	6
Alt	(South Africa) Damon Gooch (United States) Justin Shane	3	1
(Belgium) G Gigounon (Belgium) Y Reuter	2	4
3	(France) H Nys (Argentina) R Olivo	6	6
(United Kingdom) L Bambridge (United Kingdom) L Broady	6	7^{7}
(United States) D Nguyen (United States) M Seeberger	1	6^{3}
(Australia) Jarryd Chaplin (Australia) B Mitchell	2	3
2	(United States) J Cerretani (United States) M Schnur	6	6

Quarterfinals
1	(Canada) P Bester (Canada) P Polansky	6	6^{1}	[7]
(United Kingdom) D Evans (United Kingdom) L Glasspool	4	7^{7}	[10]
Alt	(South Africa) K-P Crowley (United States) S Kozlov	2	1
WC	(Canada) D Shapovalov (Netherlands) T van Rijthoven	6	6
(United States) D Baughman (United States) E Quigley	6^{5}	3
3	(France) H Nys (Argentina) R Olivo	7^{7}	6
(United Kingdom) L Bambridge (United Kingdom) L Broady	6	3	[12]
2	(United States) J Cerretani (United States) M Schnur	3	6	[14]

Semifinals
(United Kingdom) D Evans (United Kingdom) L Glasspool	6	4	[10]
WC	(Canada) D Shapovalov (Netherlands) T van Rijthoven	2	6	[8]
3	(France) H Nys (Argentina) R Olivo
2	(United States) J Cerretani (United States) M Schnur	w/o

Final
(United Kingdom) D Evans (United Kingdom) L Glasspool	6	3	[9]
2	(United States) J Cerretani (United States) M Schnur	3	6	[11]
