= 2017 Challenger Banque Nationale de Drummondville =

- Date: March 14–19
- Edition: 11th
- Category: ATP Challenger Tour
- Prize money: US$75,000
- Surface: Hard (indoor)
- Location: Drummondville, Canada
- Venue: Tennis intérieur René-Verrier

Champions

Singles
- (Canada) Denis Shapovalov

Doubles
- (Australia) Sam Groth / (Canada) Adil Shamasdin
| ← 2016 · | Challenger de Drummondville | · 2018 → |

The 2017 Challenger Banque Nationale de Drummondville was a professional tennis tournament played on indoor hard courts. It was the 11th edition of the tournament and part of the 2017 ATP Challenger Tour, offering a total of $75,000 in prize money. It took place in Drummondville, Canada between March 14 and March 19, 2017.

== Singles main-draw entrants ==
=== Seeds ===
| Country | Player | Rank^{1} | Seed |
|---|---|---|---|
| CZE | Adam Pavlásek | 94 | 1 |
| CAN | Peter Polansky | 124 | 2 |
| FRA | Quentin Halys | 137 | 3 |
| BEL | Ruben Bemelmans | 154 | 4 |
| FRA | Vincent Millot | 156 | 5 |
| USA | Tennys Sandgren | 166 | 6 |
| AUS | Sam Groth | 187 | 7 |
| NED | Igor Sijsling | 204 | 8 |

- ^{1} Rankings are as of March 6, 2017

=== Other entrants ===
The following players received wildcards into the singles main draw:

- (Canada) Félix Auger-Aliassime
- (Canada) Philip Bester
- (Canada) Filip Peliwo
- (Canada) Brayden Schnur

The following players received entry as alternates:

- (France) Grégoire Barrère
- (United States) Daniel Nguyen
- (Canada) Peter Polansky
- (Colombia) Eduardo Struvay

The following players received entry from the qualifying draw:

- (Germany) Matthias Bachinger
- (Switzerland) Adrien Bossel
- (United Kingdom) Liam Broady
- (Germany) Tim Pütz

== Champions ==
=== Singles ===
- (Canada) Denis Shapovalov def. (Belgium) Ruben Bemelmans, 6–3, 6–2

=== Doubles ===
- (Australia) Sam Groth / (Canada) Adil Shamasdin def. (Australia) Matt Reid / (Australia) John-Patrick Smith, 6–3, 2–6, [10–8]
