= 2018 MercedesCup – Doubles =

Tennis tournament

Doubles
- 2018 MercedesCup

Final
- Champions: (Germany) Philipp Petzschner (Germany) Tim Pütz
- Runners-up: (Sweden) Robert Lindstedt (Poland) Marcin Matkowski
- Score: 7–6^{(7–5)}, 6–3

Details
- Draw: 16
- Seeds: 4

Events
Singles	Doubles
← 2017 ·	Stuttgart Open	· 2019 →

Jamie Murray and Bruno Soares were defending champions, but chose not to defend their title.

Philipp Petzschner and Tim Pütz won the title, defeating Robert Lindstedt and Marcin Matkowski in the final, 7–6^{(7–5)}, 6–3.

== Seeds ==
1. (Pakistan) Aisam-ul-Haq Qureshi / (Netherlands) Jean-Julien Rojer (semifinals)
2. (Japan) Ben McLachlan (Germany) Jan-Lennard Struff (first round)
3. (Belarus) Max Mirnyi / (Austria) Philipp Oswald (quarterfinals)
4. (Brazil) Marcelo Demoliner / (Spain) Feliciano López (quarterfinals)

== Draw ==
=== Key ===
- Q = Qualifier
- WC = Wild card
- LL = Lucky loser
- Alt = Alternate
- SE = Special exempt
- PR = Protected ranking
- ITF = ITF entry
- JE = Junior exempt
- w/o = Walkover
- r = Retired
- d = Defaulted
- SR = Special ranking

=== Draw ===
First round
1	(Pakistan) A-u-H Qureshi (Netherlands) J-J Rojer	7^{7}	6
(Australia) J Millman (Argentina) G Pella	6^{3}	4
WC	(Germany) M Bachinger (Germany) Y Maden	5	6^{7}
(Australia) N Kyrgios (United States) J Withrow	7	7^{9}
4	(Brazil) M Demoliner (Spain) F López	6	6
(Germany) P Kohlschreiber (Canada) D Nestor	3	4
(India) S Balaji (India) V Vardhan	2	6	[7]
WC	(Germany) P Petzschner (Germany) T Pütz	6	3	[10]
(Germany) A Begemann (Germany) M Marterer	5	5
(Sweden) R Lindstedt (Poland) M Matkowski	7	7
(France) H Nys (Canada) D Shapovalov	5	3
3	(Belarus) M Mirnyi (Austria) P Oswald	7	6
(Thailand) Sa Ratiwatana (Thailand) So Ratiwatana	5	6	[7]
(Hungary) M Fucsovics (Germany) M Zverev	7	3	[10]
(France) J Eysseric (France) L Pouille	6^{5}	6	[10]
2	(Japan) B McLachlan (Germany) J-L Struff	7^{7}	3	[7]

Quarterfinals
1	(Pakistan) A-u-H Qureshi (Netherlands) J-J Rojer	6^{5}	7	[10]
(Australia) N Kyrgios (United States) J Withrow	7^{7}	5	[8]
4	(Brazil) M Demoliner (Spain) F López	4	7^{7}	[6]
WC	(Germany) P Petzschner (Germany) T Pütz	6	6^{5}	[10]
(Sweden) R Lindstedt (Poland) M Matkowski	6	6
3	(Belarus) M Mirnyi (Austria) P Oswald	3	4
(Hungary) M Fucsovics (Germany) M Zverev	6	5	[10]
(France) J Eysseric (France) L Pouille	3	7	[4]

Semifinals
1	(Pakistan) A-u-H Qureshi (Netherlands) J-J Rojer	6^{2}	3
WC	(Germany) P Petzschner (Germany) T Pütz	7^{7}	6
(Sweden) R Lindstedt (Poland) M Matkowski	6	6^{7}	[12]
(Hungary) M Fucsovics (Germany) M Zverev	3	7^{9}	[10]

Final
WC	(Germany) P Petzschner (Germany) T Pütz	7^{7}	6
(Sweden) R Lindstedt (Poland) M Matkowski	6^{5}	3
