= 2019 Challenger Banque Nationale de Drummondville =

- Date: March 11–17
- Edition: 13th
- Category: ATP Challenger Tour
- Surface: Hard (indoor)
- Location: Drummondville, Canada

Champions

Singles
- (Lithuania) Ričardas Berankis

Doubles
- (United Kingdom) Scott Clayton / (Canada) Adil Shamasdin
| ← 2018 · | Challenger de Drummondville | · 2020 → |

The 2019 Challenger Banque Nationale de Drummondville was a professional tennis tournament played on indoor hard courts. It was the 13th edition of the tournament and part of the 2019 ATP Challenger Tour. It took place in Drummondville, Canada between March 11 and March 17, 2019.

== Singles main-draw entrants ==
=== Seeds ===
| Country | Player | Rank^{1} | Seed |
|---|---|---|---|
| LTU | Ričardas Berankis | 95 | 1 |
| GER | Yannick Maden | 119 | 2 |
| EST | Jürgen Zopp | 157 | 3 |
| ECU | Roberto Quiroz | 175 | 4 |
| BEL | Arthur De Greef | 183 | 5 |
| SRB | Nikola Milojević | 184 | 6 |
| FRA | Maxime Janvier | 211 | 7 |
| AUS | John-Patrick Smith | 219 | 8 |
| USA | JC Aragone | 243 | 9 |
| DOM | Roberto Cid Subervi | 249 | 10 |
| DEN | Mikael Torpegaard | 255 | 11 |
| USA | Christian Harrison | 258 | 12 |
| USA | Thai-Son Kwiatkowski | 264 | 13 |
| ITA | Matteo Viola | 268 | 14 |
| JPN | Kaichi Uchida | 282 | 15 |
| FRA | Tristan Lamasine | 286 | 16 |

- ^{1} Rankings are as of March 4, 2019.

=== Other entrants ===
The following players received wildcards into the singles main draw:

- (Canada) Taha Baadi
- (Canada) Liam Draxl
- (Canada) Pavel Krainik
- (Canada) Joshua Peck
- (Australia) John-Patrick Smith

The following players received entry into the singles main draw as alternates:

- (Sweden) André Göransson
- (Belgium) Yannick Mertens

The following players received entry into the singles main draw using their ITF World Tennis Ranking:

- (Netherlands) Gijs Brouwer
- (Argentina) Matías Franco Descotte
- (France) Evan Furness
- (Netherlands) Jelle Sels

The following players received entry from the qualifying draw:

- (France) Manuel Guinard
- (Tunisia) Skander Mansouri

== Champions ==
=== Singles ===
- (Lithuania) Ričardas Berankis def. (Germany) Yannick Maden 6–3, 7–5.

=== Doubles ===
- (United Kingdom) Scott Clayton / (Canada) Adil Shamasdin def. (Australia) Matt Reid / (Australia) John-Patrick Smith 7–5, 3–6, [10–5].
