= 2017 Challenger Banque Nationale de Drummondville – Doubles =

Doubles
- 2017 Challenger Banque Nationale de Drummondville

Final
- Champions: (Australia) Sam Groth (Canada) Adil Shamasdin
- Runners-up: (Australia) Matt Reid (Australia) John-Patrick Smith
- Score: 6–3, 2–6, [10–8]

Events
Singles	Doubles
- Challenger de Drummondville

James Cerretani and Max Schnur were the defending champions, but decided not to participate this year.

Sam Groth and Adil Shamasdin won the title, defeating Matt Reid and John-Patrick Smith 6–3, 2–6, [10–8] in the final.

== Seeds ==
1. (Australia) Sam Groth / (Canada) Adil Shamasdin (champions)
2. (Australia) Matt Reid / (Australia) John-Patrick Smith (final)
3. (Italy) Riccardo Ghedin / (Germany) Andreas Mies (quarterfinals)
4. (Canada) Philip Bester / (Australia) Luke Saville (semifinals)

== Draw ==
Key

- Q = Qualifier
- WC = Wild card
- LL = Lucky loser
- Alt = Alternate
- ITF = ITF entry
- PR = Protected ranking
- SR = Special ranking
- SE = Special exempt
- JE = Junior exempt
- JR = Junior Accelerator Programme entrant
- CO = College Accelerator Programme entrant
- NG = Next Gen Accelerator Program entrant
- w/o = Walkover
- r = Retired
- d = Defaulted

First round
1	(Australia) S Groth (Canada) A Shamasdin	6	6
(Sweden) I Arvidsson (Denmark) F Nielsen	4	4
(Austria) M Neuchrist (Netherlands) D Pel	6	3	[10]
(Australia) Jarryd Chaplin (New Zealand) B McLachlan	3	6	[8]
3	(Italy) R Ghedin (Germany) A Mies	6	6
(Canada) P Polansky (United States) T Sandgren	4	4
WC	(Canada) F Peliwo (Canada) B Schnur	4	2
(Republic of Ireland) D O'Hare (United Kingdom) J Salisbury	6	6
(United States) A Krajicek (United States) J Withrow	6^{1}	6	[10]
(Belgium) M Authom (France) V Millot	7^{7}	3	[3]
WC	(Canada) Isade Juneau (Canada) Samuel Monette	6^{3}	3
4	(Canada) P Bester (Australia) L Saville	7^{7}	6
(United States) S Bangoura (United Kingdom) E Corrie	7^{7}	4	[7]
WC	(Canada) F Auger-Aliassime (Canada) D Shapovalov	6^{2}	6	[10]
(France) H Nys (Belgium) Y Reuter	4	4
2	(Australia) M Reid (Australia) J-P Smith	6	6

Quarterfinals
1	(Australia) S Groth (Canada) A Shamasdin	w/o
(Austria) M Neuchrist (Netherlands) D Pel
3	(Italy) R Ghedin (Germany) A Mies	6	2	[9]
(Republic of Ireland) D O'Hare (United Kingdom) J Salisbury	3	6	[11]
(United States) A Krajicek (United States) J Withrow	6	6^{5}	[11]
4	(Canada) P Bester (Australia) L Saville	3	7^{7}	[13]
WC	(Canada) F Auger-Aliassime (Canada) D Shapovalov	7^{7}	1	[8]
2	(Australia) M Reid (Australia) J-P Smith	6^{5}	6	[10]

Semifinals
1	(Australia) S Groth (Canada) A Shamasdin	6^{4}	7^{7}	[11]
(Republic of Ireland) D O'Hare (United Kingdom) J Salisbury	7^{7}	6^{4}	[9]
4	(Canada) P Bester (Australia) L Saville	4	6^{2}
2	(Australia) M Reid (Australia) J-P Smith	6	7^{7}

Final
1	(Australia) S Groth (Canada) A Shamasdin	6	2	[10]
2	(Australia) M Reid (Australia) J-P Smith	3	6	[8]
