= 2019 MercedesCup – Singles =

Singles
- 2019 MercedesCup

Final
- Champion: (Italy) Matteo Berrettini
- Runner-up: (Canada) Félix Auger-Aliassime
- Score: 6–4, 7–6^{(13-11)}

Details
- Draw: 28 (4 Q / 3 WC )
- Seeds: 8

Events
| Singles | Doubles |
- Stuttgart Open

Roger Federer was the defending champion, but chose not to participate this year.

Unseeded Matteo Berrettini won the title, defeating Félix Auger-Aliassime in the final, 6–4, 7–6^{(13-11)}. Berrettini did not lose serve through 50 service games in the tournament.

== Seeds ==
The top four seeds receive a bye into the second round.

1. (Germany) Alexander Zverev (second round)
2. (Russia) Karen Khachanov (second round)
3. (Russia) Daniil Medvedev (second round)
4. (Georgia (country)) Nikoloz Basilashvili (second round)
5. (France) Gaël Monfils (second round)
6. (Canada) Milos Raonic (semifinals, withdrew due to back injury)
7. (Canada) Félix Auger-Aliassime (final)
8. (Canada) Denis Shapovalov (first round)

== Draw ==
Key

- Q = Qualifier
- WC = Wild card
- LL = Lucky loser
- Alt = Alternate
- ITF = ITF entry
- PR = Protected ranking
- SR = Special ranking
- SE = Special exempt
- JE = Junior exempt
- JR = Junior Accelerator Programme entrant
- CO = College Accelerator Programme entrant
- NG = Next Gen Accelerator Program entrant
- w/o = Walkover
- r = Retired
- d = Defaulted

=== Finals ===
Semifinals
7 | (Canada) Félix Auger-Aliassime | w/o
6 | (Canada) Milos Raonic
(Germany) Jan-Lennard Struff | 4 | 5
(Italy) Matteo Berrettini | 6 | 7

Final
7 | (Canada) Félix Auger-Aliassime | 4 | 6^{11}
(Italy) Matteo Berrettini | 6 | 7^{13}

=== Top half ===
First round
Q | (Germany) D Brown | 6 | 7^{7}
(Australia) J Millman | 4 | 6^{3}
(Germany) P Gojowczyk | 6 | 2 | 3
(France) G Simon | 4 | 6 | 6
(Latvia) E Gulbis | 5 | 3
7 | (Canada) F Auger-Aliassime | 7 | 6
(Hungary) M Fucsovics | 7^{7} | 6
(Spain) J Munar | 6^{5} | 4
WC | (Germany) M Zverev | 3 | 0
PR | (France) J-W Tsonga | 6 | 6
Q | (Australia) A Popyrin | 7^{8} | 4 | 6^{4}
6 | (Canada) M Raonic | 6^{6} | 6 | 7^{7}

Second round
1/WC | (Germany) A Zverev | 4 | 7^{7} | 3
Q | (Germany) D Brown | 6 | 6^{3} | 6
(France) G Simon | 5 | 4
7 | (Canada) F Auger-Aliassime | 7 | 6
4 | (Georgia (country)) N Basilashvili | 7^{7} | 2 | 5
(Hungary) M Fucsovics | 6^{4} | 6 | 7
PR | (France) J-W Tsonga | 4 | 7^{7} | 6^{1}
6 | (Canada) M Raonic | 6 | 6^{5} | 7^{7}

Quarterfinals
Q | (Germany) D Brown | 6^{3} | 7^{7} | 6^{2}
7 | (Canada) F Auger-Aliassime | 7^{7} | 6^{2} | 7^{7}
(Hungary) M Fucsovics | 4 | 4
6 | (Canada) M Raonic | 6 | 6

Semifinals
7 | (Canada) F Auger-Aliassime | w/o
6 | (Canada) M Raonic

=== Bottom half ===
First round
8 | (Canada) D Shapovalov | 5 | 4
(Germany) J-L Struff | 7 | 6
(Germany) P Kohlschreiber | 6 | 5 | 3
(Serbia) M Kecmanović | 4 | 7 | 6
Q | (Spain) F López | 3 | 6 | 6^{7}
WC | (France) L Pouille | 6 | 3 | 7^{9}
5 | (France) G Monfils | 7 | 5 | 7^{8}
(United States) S Johnson | 5 | 7 | 6^{6}
(United States) D Kudla | 6 | 6
Q | (Croatia) V Galović | 3 | 2
(Italy) M Berrettini | 6 | 6
(Australia) N Kyrgios | 3 | 4

Second round
(Germany) J-L Struff | 6 | 6
(Serbia) M Kecmanović | 2 | 2
WC | (France) L Pouille | 7^{8} | 4 | 6
3 | (Russia) D Medvedev | 6^{6} | 6 | 2
5 | (France) G Monfils | 5 | 7^{7} | 6^{3}
(United States) D Kudla | 7 | 6^{3} | 7^{7}
(Italy) M Berrettini | 6 | 6
2 | (Russia) K Khachanov | 4 | 2

Quarterfinals
(Germany) J-L Struff | 6 | 6
WC | (France) L Pouille | 4 | 4
(United States) D Kudla | 3 | 3
(Italy) M Berrettini | 6 | 6

Semifinals
(Germany) J-L Struff | 4 | 5
(Italy) M Berrettini | 6 | 7

== Qualifying ==
=== Seeds ===
1. (India) Prajnesh Gunneswaran (first round, retired)
2. (Kazakhstan) Alexander Bublik (qualifying competition)
3. (Uzbekistan) Denis Istomin (first round)
4. (Canada) Brayden Schnur (first round)
5. (Spain) Feliciano López (qualified)
6. (Australia) Alexei Popyrin (qualified)
7. (Ukraine) Sergiy Stakhovsky (qualifying competition)
8. (France) Grégoire Barrère (qualifying competition)

=== Qualifiers ===
1. (Australia) Alexei Popyrin
2. (Spain) Feliciano López
3. (Germany) Dustin Brown
4. (Croatia) Viktor Galović

=== Qualifying draw ===
==== First qualifier ====
First round
1 | (India) Prajnesh Gunneswaran | 7^{8} | 6^{0} | 1^{r}
Alt | (Italy) Matteo Viola | 6^{6} | 7^{7} | 2
Alt | (Australia) Maverick Banes | 6 | 3 | 6^{3}
6 | (Australia) Alexei Popyrin | 4 | 6 | 7^{7}

Qualifying competition
Alt | (Italy) Matteo Viola | 3 | 5
6 | (Australia) Alexei Popyrin | 6 | 7

==== Second qualifier ====
First round
2 | (Kazakhstan) Alexander Bublik | 6 | 6
(Japan) Hiroki Moriya | 0 | 3
WC | (Germany) Tim Pütz | 6^{1} | 5
5 | (Spain) Feliciano López | 7^{7} | 7

Qualifying competition
2 | (Kazakhstan) Alexander Bublik | 5 | 4
5 | (Spain) Feliciano López | 7 | 6

==== Third qualifier ====
First round
3 | (Uzbekistan) Denis Istomin | 5 | 4
(Germany) Dustin Brown | 7 | 6
WC | (India) Sasikumar Mukund | 3 | 4
8 | (France) Grégoire Barrère | 6 | 6

Qualifying competition
(Germany) Dustin Brown | 6 | 7^{7}
8 | (France) Grégoire Barrère | 2 | 6^{2}

==== Fourth qualifier ====
First round
4 | (Canada) Brayden Schnur | 6 | 3 | 4
(Croatia) Viktor Galović | 4 | 6 | 6
(Spain) Adrián Menéndez Maceiras | 3 | 4
7 | (Ukraine) Sergiy Stakhovsky | 6 | 6

Qualifying competition
(Croatia) Viktor Galović | 6 | 2 | 6
7 | (Ukraine) Sergiy Stakhovsky | 4 | 6 | 4
