= 2021 MercedesCup =

- Date: 8–13 June
- Edition: 43rd
- Category: ATP Tour 250
- Draw: 28S / 16D
- Prize money: €543,210
- Surface: Grass
- Location: Stuttgart, Germany
- Venue: Tennis Club Weissenhof

Champions

Singles
- (Croatia) Marin Čilić

Doubles
- (Brazil) Marcelo Demoliner / (Mexico) Santiago González
- Stuttgart Open

The 2021 MercedesCup was a men's tennis tournament played on outdoor grass courts. It was the 43rd edition of the Stuttgart Open, and part of the ATP Tour 250 series of the 2021 ATP Tour. It was held at the Tennis Club Weissenhof in Stuttgart, Germany, from 8 June until 13 June 2021. Unseeded Marin Čilić won the singles title.

== Finals ==
=== Singles ===
- (Croatia) Marin Čilić defeated (Canada) Félix Auger-Aliassime, 7–6^{(7–2)}, 6–3

=== Doubles ===
- (Brazil) Marcelo Demoliner / (Mexico) Santiago González defeated (Uruguay) Ariel Behar / (Ecuador) Gonzalo Escobar, 4–6, 6–3, [10–8]

== Points and prize money ==
=== Point distribution ===
Event	W	F	SF	QF	Round of 16	Round of 32	Q	Q2	Q1
Singles	250	150	90	45	20	0	12	6	0
Doubles	250	150	90	45	0	—N/a	—N/a	—N/a	—N/a

=== Prize money ===
Event	W	F	SF	QF	Round of 16	Round of 32	Q2	Q1
Singles	€53,280	€38,200	€27,195	€18,130	€11,660	€7,010	€3,425	€1,780
Doubles*	€19,880	€14,240	€9,390	€6,090	€3,580	—N/a	—N/a	—N/a

_{*per team}

== ATP singles main draw entrants ==
=== Seeds ===
Country	Player	Rank^{1}	Seed
CAN	Denis Shapovalov	14	1
POL	Hubert Hurkacz	17	2
CAN	Félix Auger-Aliassime	21	3
AUS	Alex de Minaur	22	4
GEO	Nikoloz Basilashvili	30	5
FRA	Ugo Humbert	31	6
FRA	Adrian Mannarino	36	7
~~AUS~~	~~John Millman~~	~~43~~	~~8~~

- ^{1} Rankings are as of 31 May 2021.

=== Other entrants ===
The following players received wildcards into the main draw:

- (Germany) Dustin Brown
- (Germany) Yannick Hanfmann
- (Germany) Rudolf Molleker
- (Austria) Jurij Rodionov
- (Switzerland) Dominic Stricker

The following players received entry from the qualifying draw:

- (Moldova) Radu Albot
- (Turkey) Altuğ Çelikbilek
- (Australia) James Duckworth
- (Germany) Peter Gojowczyk

The following player received entry as a lucky loser:

- (Belarus) Ilya Ivashka

=== Withdrawals ===
Before the tournament

- (Kazakhstan) Alexander Bublik → replaced by (Australia) Alexei Popyrin
- (United States) Taylor Fritz → replaced by (Croatia) Marin Čilić
- (Chile) Cristian Garín → replaced by (Australia) Jordan Thompson
- (Russia) Aslan Karatsev → replaced by (France) Jérémy Chardy
- (United States) Reilly Opelka → replaced by (South Africa) Lloyd Harris
- (France) Benoît Paire → replaced by (United States) Sam Querrey
- (Canada) Milos Raonic → replaced by (Hungary) Márton Fucsovics
- (Italy) Jannik Sinner → replaced by (Germany) Dominik Koepfer
- (Italy) Lorenzo Sonego → replaced by (Argentina) Guido Pella
- (Germany) Jan-Lennard Struff → replaced by (Spain) Feliciano López
- (Switzerland) Stan Wawrinka → replaced by (Belarus) Ilya Ivashka
- (Germany) Alexander Zverev → replaced by (France) Gilles Simon

=== Retirements ===
- (Germany) Peter Gojowczyk

== ATP doubles main draw entrants ==
=== Seeds ===
Country	Player	Country	Player	Rank^{1}	Seed
GBR	Jamie Murray	BRA	Bruno Soares	33	1
FRA	Jérémy Chardy	FRA	Fabrice Martin	58	2
RSA	Raven Klaasen	JPN	Ben McLachlan	67	3
NZL	Marcus Daniell	AUT	Philipp Oswald	75	4

- ^{1} Rankings are as of 31 May 2021.

=== Other entrants ===
The following pairs received wildcards into the doubles main draw:

- (Germany) Andre Begemann / (Germany) Dustin Brown
- (Germany) Yannick Hanfmann / (Germany) Dominik Koepfer

The following pairs received entry as alternates:

- (Canada) Félix Auger-Aliassime / (United States) Nicholas Monroe
- (Georgia (country)) Nikoloz Basilashvili / (India) Divij Sharan
- (Uruguay) Ariel Behar / (Ecuador) Gonzalo Escobar
- (Brazil) Marcelo Demoliner / (Mexico) Santiago González
- (Argentina) Máximo González / (Argentina) Andrés Molteni
- (Poland) Hubert Hurkacz / (Poland) Łukasz Kubot
- (Austria) Oliver Marach / (Pakistan) Aisam-ul-Haq Qureshi
- (Denmark) Frederik Nielsen / (Netherlands) Jean-Julien Rojer
- (Australia) Luke Saville / (Australia) Jordan Thompson

=== Withdrawals ===
Before the tournament

- (India) Rohan Bopanna / (Croatia) Franko Škugor → replaced by (Austria) Oliver Marach / (Pakistan) Aisam-ul-Haq Qureshi
- (Kazakhstan) Alexander Bublik / (United States) Reilly Opelka → replaced by (Uruguay) Ariel Behar / (Ecuador) Gonzalo Escobar
- (Belgium) Sander Gillé / (Belgium) Joran Vliegen → replaced by (Argentina) Máximo González / (Argentina) Andrés Molteni
- (Netherlands) Wesley Koolhof / (Netherlands) Jean-Julien Rojer → replaced by (Denmark) Frederik Nielsen / (Netherlands) Jean-Julien Rojer
- (United States) Sebastian Korda / (United States) Rajeev Ram → replaced by (Brazil) Marcelo Demoliner / (Mexico) Santiago González
- (Germany) Kevin Krawietz / (Australia) John Peers → replaced by (Canada) Félix Auger-Aliassime / (United States) Nicholas Monroe
- (Poland) Łukasz Kubot / (Brazil) Marcelo Melo → replaced by (Poland) Hubert Hurkacz / (Poland) Łukasz Kubot
- (France) Adrian Mannarino / (France) Benoît Paire → replaced by (Georgia (country)) Nikoloz Basilashvili / (India) Divij Sharan
- (Germany) Tim Pütz / (New Zealand) Michael Venus → replaced by (Australia) Luke Saville / (Australia) Jordan Thompson

During the tournament

- (Germany) Yannick Hanfmann / (Germany) Dominik Koepfer
