= 2021 MercedesCup – Doubles =

Doubles
- 2021 MercedesCup

Final
- Champions: (Brazil) Marcelo Demoliner (Mexico) Santiago González
- Runners-up: (Uruguay) Ariel Behar (Ecuador) Gonzalo Escobar
- Score: 4–6, 6–3, [10–8]

Details
- Draw: 16
- Seeds: 4

Events
Singles	Doubles
- Stuttgart Open

Marcelo Demoliner and Santiago González defeated Ariel Behar and Gonzalo Escobar in the final, 4–6, 6–3, [10–8], to win the doubles tennis title at the 2021 Stuttgart Open. It was their second title as a team, their first in three years. Behar and Escobar were contesting for their third title of the season.

John Peers and Bruno Soares were the defending champions from when the tournament was last held in 2019, but Peers chose not to participate. Soares played alongside Jamie Murray but lost in the first round to Demoliner and González

== Seeds ==
1. (United Kingdom) Jamie Murray / (Brazil) Bruno Soares (first round)
2. (France) Jérémy Chardy / (France) Fabrice Martin (first round)
3. (South Africa) Raven Klaasen / (Japan) Ben McLachlan (first round)
4. (New Zealand) Marcus Daniell / (Austria) Philipp Oswald (quarterfinals)

== Draw ==
Key

- Q = Qualifier
- WC = Wild card
- LL = Lucky loser
- Alt = Alternate
- ITF = ITF entry
- PR = Protected ranking
- SR = Special ranking
- SE = Special exempt
- JE = Junior exempt
- JR = Junior Accelerator Programme entrant
- CO = College Accelerator Programme entrant
- NG = Next Gen Accelerator Program entrant
- w/o = Walkover
- r = Retired
- d = Defaulted

=== Draw ===
First round
1	(United Kingdom) J Murray (Brazil) B Soares	2	6	[7]
Alt	(Brazil) M Demoliner (Mexico) S González	6	3	[10]
(Poland) H Hurkacz (Poland) Ł Kubot	6	6
Alt	(Austria) O Marach (Pakistan) A-u-H Qureshi	3	4
3	(South Africa) R Klaasen (Japan) B McLachlan	4	6	[8]
WC	(Germany) A Begemann (Germany) D Brown	6	3	[10]
Alt	(Argentina) M González (Argentina) A Molteni	6^{5}	6	[10]
Alt	(Canada) F Auger-Aliassime (United States) N Monroe	7^{7}	3	[8]
Alt	(Georgia (country)) N Basilashvili (India) D Sharan	4	2
Alt	(Uruguay) A Behar (Ecuador) G Escobar	6	6
Alt	(Denmark) F Nielsen (Netherlands) J-J Rojer	5	7^{12}	[4]
4	(New Zealand) M Daniell (Austria) P Oswald	7	6^{10}	[10]
WC	(Germany) Y Hanfmann (Germany) D Koepfer	6	4	[10]
Alt	(Australia) L Saville (Australia) J Thompson	1	6	[7]
(Croatia) M Čilić (Croatia) I Dodig	6^{4}	6	[10]
2	(France) J Chardy (France) F Martin	7^{7}	4	[8]

Quarterfinals
Alt	(Brazil) M Demoliner (Mexico) S González	6	6
(Poland) H Hurkacz (Poland) Ł Kubot	4	4
WC	(Germany) A Begemann (Germany) D Brown	7^{7}	4	[6]
Alt	(Argentina) M González (Argentina) A Molteni	6^{5}	6	[10]
Alt	(Uruguay) A Behar (Ecuador) G Escobar	7^{10}	7^{7}
4	(New Zealand) M Daniell (Austria) P Oswald	6^{8}	6^{5}
WC	(Germany) Y Hanfmann (Germany) D Koepfer
(Croatia) M Čilić (Croatia) I Dodig	w/o

Semifinals
Alt	(Brazil) M Demoliner (Mexico) S González	7^{7}	6^{5}	[10]
Alt	(Argentina) M González (Argentina) A Molteni	6^{3}	7^{7}	[6]
Alt	(Uruguay) A Behar (Ecuador) G Escobar	7^{7}	1	[14]
(Croatia) M Čilić (Croatia) I Dodig	6^{5}	6	[12]

Final
Alt	(Brazil) M Demoliner (Mexico) S González	4	6	[10]
Alt	(Uruguay) A Behar (Ecuador) G Escobar	6	3	[8]
