= 2016 Challenger Banque Nationale de Drummondville =

- Date: March 14–20
- Edition: 10th
- Category: ATP Challenger Tour
- Prize money: US$50,000+H
- Surface: Hard (indoor)
- Location: Drummondville, Canada
- Venue: Tennis intérieur René-Verrier

Champions

Singles
- (United Kingdom) Daniel Evans

Doubles
- (United States) James Cerretani / (United States) Max Schnur
| ← 2015 · | Challenger de Drummondville | · 2017 → |

The 2016 Challenger Banque Nationale de Drummondville was a professional tennis tournament played on indoor hard courts. It was the 10th edition of the tournament and part of the 2016 ATP Challenger Tour, offering a total of $50,000 in prize money. It took place in Drummondville, Canada between March 14 and March 20, 2016.

== Singles main-draw entrants ==
=== Seeds ===
| Country | Player | Rank^{1} | Seed |
|---|---|---|---|
| JPN | Yūichi Sugita | 99 | 1 |
| USA | Austin Krajicek | 101 | 2 |
| NED | Igor Sijsling | 150 | 3 |
| GBR | Daniel Evans | 157 | 4 |
| ARG | Renzo Olivo | 167 | 5 |
| BEL | Yannick Mertens | 198 | 6 |
| USA | Tommy Paul | 225 | 7 |
| USA | Daniel Nguyen | 240 | 8 |

- ^{1} Rankings are as of March 7, 2016

=== Other entrants ===
The following players received wildcards into the singles main draw:

- (Canada) Filip Peliwo
- (Canada) Peter Polansky
- (Canada) Denis Shapovalov

The following players received entry as alternates:

- (United States) Deiton Baughman
- (Slovakia) Filip Horanský
- (United States) Evan King
- (Australia) Blake Mott

The following players received entry from the qualifying draw:

- (United States) Winston Lin
- (France) Hugo Nys
- (Chile) Nicolás Jarry
- (Netherlands) Tim van Rijthoven

The following player received entry as a lucky loser:

- (United Kingdom) Edward Corrie

== Champions ==
=== Singles ===
- (United Kingdom) Daniel Evans def. (United Kingdom) Edward Corrie, 6–3, 6–4

=== Doubles ===
- (United States) James Cerretani / (United States) Max Schnur def. (United Kingdom) Daniel Evans / (United Kingdom) Lloyd Glasspool, 3–6, 6–3, [11–9]
