= 2019 Challenger Banque Nationale de Drummondville – Singles =

Singles
- 2019 Challenger Banque Nationale de Drummondville

Final
- Champion: (Lithuania) Ričardas Berankis
- Runner-up: (Germany) Yannick Maden
- Score: 6–3, 7–5

Events
Singles	Doubles
← 2018 ·	Challenger de Drummondville	· 2020 →

Denis Kudla was the defending champion but chose not to defend his title.

Ričardas Berankis won the title after defeating Yannick Maden 6–3, 7–5 in the final.

== Seeds ==
All seeds receive a bye into the second round.

1. (Lithuania) Ričardas Berankis (champion)
2. (Germany) Yannick Maden (final)
3. (Estonia) Jürgen Zopp (quarterfinals)
4. (Ecuador) Roberto Quiroz (third round)
5. (Belgium) Arthur De Greef (quarterfinals)
6. (Serbia) Nikola Milojević (third round)
7. (France) Maxime Janvier (second round)
8. (Australia) John-Patrick Smith (third round)
9. (United States) JC Aragone (second round)
10. (Dominican Republic) Roberto Cid Subervi (quarterfinals)
11. (Denmark) Mikael Torpegaard (quarterfinals)
12. (United States) Christian Harrison (second round)
13. (United States) Thai-Son Kwiatkowski (second round)
14. (Italy) Matteo Viola (semifinals)
15. (Japan) Kaichi Uchida (third round)
16. (France) Tristan Lamasine (third round)

== Draw ==
=== Key ===
- Q = Qualifier
- WC = Wild card
- LL = Lucky loser
- Alt = Alternate
- ITF = ITF entry
- PR = Protected ranking
- SR = Special ranking
- SE = Special exempt
- JE = Junior exempt
- JR = Junior Accelerator Programme entrant
- CO = College Accelerator Programme entrant
- NG = Next Gen Accelerator Program entrant
- w/o = Walkover
- r = Retired
- d = Defaulted

=== Finals ===
Quarterfinals
1	(Lithuania) Ričardas Berankis	7^{7}	6
11	(Denmark) Mikael Torpegaard	6^{3}	4
14	(Italy) Matteo Viola	6	7
5	(Belgium) Arthur De Greef	3	5
(United States) Michael Redlicki	4	7	6
3	(Estonia) Jürgen Zopp	6	5	3
10	(Dominican Republic) Roberto Cid Subervi	2	4
2	(Germany) Yannick Maden	6	6

Semifinals
1	(Lithuania) Ričardas Berankis	6	6
14	(Italy) Matteo Viola	4	0
(United States) Michael Redlicki	7	5	0^{r}
2	(Germany) Yannick Maden	5	7	4

Final
1	(Lithuania) Ričardas Berankis	6	7
2	(Germany) Yannick Maden	3	5

=== Top half ===
==== Section 1 ====
First round
Q	(France) M Guinard	4	3
(United States) C Altamirano	6	6
ITF	(Argentina) MF Descotte	2	7^{7}	1
Alt	(Belgium) Y Mertens	6	6^{4}	6
ITF	(France) E Furness	3	6^{2}
ITF	(Netherlands) J Sels	6	7^{7}
ITF	(Netherlands) G Brouwer	7	6
(United States) S Kozlov	5	3

Second round
1	(Lithuania) R Berankis	6	7
(United States) C Altamirano	4	5
Alt	(Belgium) Y Mertens	5	6	4
15	(Japan) K Uchida	7	4	6
11	(Denmark) M Torpegaard	6	6
ITF	(Netherlands) J Sels	2	3
ITF	(Netherlands) G Brouwer	6	6
7	(France) M Janvier	4	4

Third round
1	(Lithuania) R Berankis	6	6
15	(Japan) K Uchida	0	4
11	(Denmark) M Torpegaard	7^{7}	6^{5}	6
ITF	(Netherlands) G Brouwer	6^{0}	7^{7}	4

Quarterfinals
1	(Lithuania) R Berankis	7^{7}	6
11	(Denmark) M Torpegaard	6^{3}	4

==== Section 2 ====
First round
(Croatia) A Pavić	2	1
(United States) Evan Song	6	6
WC	(Canada) Pavel Krainik	6^{6}	3
Q	(Tunisia) S Mansouri	7^{8}	6
(France) V Millot	6	6
WC	(Canada) Joshua Peck	3	3
(United States) U Blanch	7^{7}	2	6
(United States) E King	6^{0}	6	4

Second round
4	(Ecuador) R Quiroz	6	6
(United States) E Song	4	3
Q	(Tunisia) S Mansouri	6	4	4
14	(Italy) M Viola	2	6	6
12	(United States) C Harrison	2	7	4
(France) V Millot	6	5	6
(United States) U Blanch	6^{5}	3
5	(Belgium) A De Greef	7^{7}	6

Third round
4	(Ecuador) R Quiroz	6	3	4
14	(Italy) M Viola	4	6	6
(France) V Millot	4	7	3
5	(Belgium) A De Greef	6	5	6

Quarterfinals
14	(Italy) M Viola	6	7
5	(Belgium) A De Greef	3	5

=== Bottom half ===
==== Section 3 ====
First round
(United States) Jared Hiltzik	5	1
(United Kingdom) L Broady	7	6
(United States) Mi Redlicki	6	6
(United States) Roy Smith	1	1
(United States) K King	3	3
(India) S Nagal	6	6
WC	(Canada) T Baadi	4	4
(Argentina) R Olivo	6	6

Second round
6	(Serbia) N Milojević	6	7^{7}
(United Kingdom) L Broady	2	6^{4}
(United States) Mi Redlicki	6	6
9	(United States) JC Aragone	2	2
16	(France) T Lamasine	6	6
(India) S Nagal	2	3
(Argentina) R Olivo	1	6	4
3	(Estonia) J Zopp	6	4	6

Third round
6	(Serbia) N Milojević	3	1
(United States) Mi Redlicki	6	6
16	(France) T Lamasine	4	4
3	(Estonia) J Zopp	6	6

Quarterfinals
(United States) Mi Redlicki	4	7	6
3	(Estonia) J Zopp	6	5	3

==== Section 4 ====
First round
WC	(Canada) L Draxl	6	6
(Japan) Y Takahashi	3	2
(Croatia) B Gojo	7	6
(Canada) S Diez	5	3
(United States) J. J. Wolf	6	6
Alt	(Sweden) A Göransson	3	4
(United States) D Novikov	6	6
(Argentina) A Collarini	4	4

Second round
8/WC	(Australia) J-P Smith	6^{2}	7	7^{7}
WC	(Canada) L Draxl	7^{7}	5	6^{3}
(Croatia) B Gojo	6^{3}	6	4
10	(Dominican Republic) R Cid Subervi	7^{7}	2	6
13	(United States) T-S Kwiatkowski	1	2
(United States) J. J. Wolf	6	6
(United States) D Novikov	4	1
2	(Germany) Y Maden	6	6

Third round
8/WC	(Australia) J-P Smith	7^{7}	5	3
10	(Dominican Republic) R Cid Subervi	6^{4}	7	6
(United States) J. J. Wolf	4	6^{4}
2	(Germany) Y Maden	6	7^{7}

Quarterfinals
10	(Dominican Republic) R Cid Subervi	2	4
2	(Germany) Y Maden	6	6
