= 2019 MercedesCup – Doubles =

Doubles
- 2019 MercedesCup

Final
- Champions: (Australia) John Peers (Brazil) Bruno Soares
- Runners-up: (India) Rohan Bopanna (Canada) Denis Shapovalov
- Score: 7–5, 6–3

Details
- Draw: 16
- Seeds: 4

Events
Singles	Doubles
← 2018 ·	MercedesCup	· 2021 →

Philipp Petzschner and Tim Pütz were the defending champions, but Petzschner chose not to participate this year. Pütz played alongside Jan-Lennard Struff, but lost in the first round to John Peers and Bruno Soares.

Peers and Soares went on to win the title, defeating Rohan Bopanna and Denis Shapovalov in the final, 7–5, 6–3.

== Seeds ==
1. (Australia) John Peers / (Brazil) Bruno Soares (champions)
2. (Croatia) Nikola Mektić / (Croatia) Franko Škugor (first round)
3. (United States) Bob Bryan / (United States) Mike Bryan (first round)
4. (Austria) Oliver Marach / (Austria) Jürgen Melzer (semifinals)

== Draw ==
=== Key ===
- Q = Qualifier
- WC = Wild card
- LL = Lucky loser
- Alt = Alternate
- SE = Special exempt
- PR = Protected ranking
- ITF = ITF entry
- JE = Junior exempt
- w/o = Walkover
- r = Retired
- d = Defaulted
- SR = Special ranking

=== Draw ===
First round
1	(Australia) J Peers (Brazil) B Soares	4	7	[10]
(Germany) T Pütz (Germany) J-L Struff	6	5	[6]
(Brazil) M Demoliner (India) D Sharan	7	6^{14}	[9]
(Ukraine) D Molchanov (New Zealand) A Sitak	5	7^{16}	[11]
4	(Austria) O Marach (Austria) J Melzer	7^{7}	6
(Germany) A Zverev (Germany) M Zverev	6^{5}	3
(United States) S Johnson (France) G Simon	3	5
(Sweden) R Lindstedt (Canada) M Raonic	6	7
WC	(Germany) A Begemann (Germany) D Brown	7	6^{4}	[13]
WC	(France) L Pouille (France) J-W Tsonga	5	7^{7}	[15]
(India) R Bopanna (Canada) D Shapovalov	6	3	[10]
3	(United States) B Bryan (United States) M Bryan	4	6	[6]
Alt	(Italy) M Berrettini (Hungary) M Fucsovics	6	3	[3]
(United Kingdom) L Bambridge (United Kingdom) J O'Mara	3	6	[10]
(Australia) N Kyrgios (Australia) M Reid	6	3	[10]
2	(Croatia) N Mektić (Croatia) F Škugor	4	6	[4]

Quarterfinals
1	(Australia) J Peers (Brazil) B Soares	6	7^{7}
(Ukraine) D Molchanov (New Zealand) A Sitak	3	6^{5}
4	(Austria) O Marach (Austria) J Melzer	6	6
(Sweden) R Lindstedt (Canada) M Raonic	2	4
WC	(France) L Pouille (France) J-W Tsonga	4	3
(India) R Bopanna (Canada) D Shapovalov	6	6
(United Kingdom) L Bambridge (United Kingdom) J O'Mara	3	4
(Australia) N Kyrgios (Australia) M Reid	6	6

Semifinals
1	(Australia) J Peers (Brazil) B Soares	7^{7}	5	[10]
4	(Austria) O Marach (Austria) J Melzer	6^{4}	7	[6]
(India) R Bopanna (Canada) D Shapovalov	6	6
(Australia) N Kyrgios (Australia) M Reid	3	4

Final
1	(Australia) J Peers (Brazil) B Soares	7	6
(India) R Bopanna (Canada) D Shapovalov	5	3
