= 2019 Challenger Banque Nationale de Drummondville – Doubles =

Doubles
- 2019 Challenger Banque Nationale de Drummondville

Final
- Champions: (United Kingdom) Scott Clayton (Canada) Adil Shamasdin
- Runners-up: (Australia) Matt Reid (Australia) John-Patrick Smith
- Score: 7–5, 3–6, [10–5]

Events
Singles	Doubles
← 2018 ·	Challenger de Drummondville	· 2020 →

Joris De Loore and Frederik Nielsen were the defending champions but chose not to defend their title.

Scott Clayton and Adil Shamasdin won the title after defeating Matt Reid and John-Patrick Smith 7–5, 3–6, [10–5] in the final.

== Seeds ==
1. (Australia) Matt Reid / (Australia) John-Patrick Smith (final)
2. (United States) Evan King / (United States) Hunter Reese (first round)
3. (United Kingdom) Scott Clayton / (Canada) Adil Shamasdin (champions)
4. (Venezuela) Luis David Martínez / (Ecuador) Roberto Quiroz (semifinals)

== Draw ==
Key

- Q = Qualifier
- WC = Wild card
- LL = Lucky loser
- Alt = Alternate
- ITF = ITF entry
- PR = Protected ranking
- SR = Special ranking
- SE = Special exempt
- JE = Junior exempt
- JR = Junior Accelerator Programme entrant
- CO = College Accelerator Programme entrant
- NG = Next Gen Accelerator Program entrant
- w/o = Walkover
- r = Retired
- d = Defaulted

First round
1	(Australia) M Reid (Australia) J-P Smith	6^{3}	6	[10]
ITF	(Argentina) MF Descotte (Tunisia) S Mansouri	7^{7}	4	[6]
WC	(Canada) J Boulais (Canada) Joshua Peck	6^{7}	5
WC	(Canada) F Dancevic (Romania) F Mergea	7^{9}	7
4	(Venezuela) LD Martínez (Ecuador) R Quiroz	6	6
(United Kingdom) L Broady (United States) T-S Kwiatkowski	4	4
(Canada) S Diez (Serbia) N Milojević	3	6^{3}
(Sweden) A Göransson (United States) N Pasha	6	7^{7}
(United States) JC Aragone (Brazil) F Romboli	3	2
ITF	(France) E Furness (France) M Guinard	6	6
WC	(Canada) T Baadi (Canada) L Draxl	2	3
3	(United Kingdom) S Clayton (Canada) A Shamasdin	6	6
(Italy) M Viola (Estonia) J Zopp	5	3
(United States) D Novikov (Croatia) A Pavić	7	6
(United States) JP Fruttero (United States) C Harrison	7^{7}	2	[10]
2	(United States) E King (United States) H Reese	6^{4}	6	[3]

Quarterfinals
1	(Australia) M Reid (Australia) J-P Smith	7	4	[10]
WC	(Canada) F Dancevic (Romania) F Mergea	5	6	[4]
4	(Venezuela) LD Martínez (Ecuador) R Quiroz	6	6
(Sweden) A Göransson (United States) N Pasha	1	3
ITF	(France) E Furness (France) M Guinard	4	3
3	(United Kingdom) S Clayton (Canada) A Shamasdin	6	6
(United States) D Novikov (Croatia) A Pavić	6	3	[10]
(United States) JP Fruttero (United States) C Harrison	3	6	[4]

Semifinals
1	(Australia) M Reid (Australia) J-P Smith	6	6
4	(Venezuela) LD Martínez (Ecuador) R Quiroz	4	1
3	(United Kingdom) S Clayton (Canada) A Shamasdin	3	7^{7}	[10]
(United States) D Novikov (Croatia) A Pavić	6	6^{4}	[5]

Final
1	(Australia) M Reid (Australia) J-P Smith	5	6	[5]
3	(United Kingdom) S Clayton (Canada) A Shamasdin	7	3	[10]
