= 2017 Challenger Banque Nationale de Drummondville – Singles =

Singles
- 2017 Challenger Banque Nationale de Drummondville

Final
- Champion: (Canada) Denis Shapovalov
- Runner-up: (Belgium) Ruben Bemelmans
- Score: 6–3, 6–2

Events
Singles	Doubles
- Challenger de Drummondville

Dan Evans was the defending champion, but decided not to participate this year.

Denis Shapovalov won the title, defeating Ruben Bemelmans 6–3, 6–2 in the final.

== Seeds ==
1. (Czech Republic) Adam Pavlásek (first round)
2. (Canada) Peter Polansky (second round)
3. (France) Quentin Halys (second round, retired)
4. (Belgium) Ruben Bemelmans (final)
5. (France) Vincent Millot (first round)
6. (United States) Tennys Sandgren (second round)
7. (Australia) Sam Groth (first round)
8. (Netherlands) Igor Sijsling (first round)

== Draw ==
Key

- Q = Qualifier
- WC = Wild card
- LL = Lucky loser
- Alt = Alternate
- ITF = ITF entry
- PR = Protected ranking
- SR = Special ranking
- SE = Special exempt
- JE = Junior exempt
- JR = Junior Accelerator Programme entrant
- CO = College Accelerator Programme entrant
- NG = Next Gen Accelerator Program entrant
- w/o = Walkover
- r = Retired
- d = Defaulted

=== Finals ===
Semifinals
(Australia) John-Patrick Smith	4	1
4	(Belgium) Ruben Bemelmans	6	6
(Canada) Denis Shapovalov	7	6
WC	(Canada) Félix Auger-Aliassime	5	3

Final
4	(Belgium) Ruben Bemelmans	3	2
(Canada) Denis Shapovalov	6	6

=== Top half ===
First round
1	(Czech Republic) A Pavlásek	3	3
(France) L Lokoli	6	6
WC	(Canada) P Bester	3	4
(Australia) J-P Smith	6	6
WC	(Canada) B Schnur	6	6
(United States) S Bangoura	3	3
Q	(Germany) T Pütz	6	6
7	(Australia) S Groth	4	4
4	(Belgium) R Bemelmans	7	6
(Belgium) Y Reuter	5	1
Q	(United Kingdom) L Broady	7^{7}	6
Alt	(Colombia) E Struvay	6^{5}	3
(France) G Sakharov	6	6
WC	(Canada) F Peliwo	2	1
(Australia) L Saville	4	2
6	(United States) T Sandgren	6	6

Second round
(France) L Lokoli	5	6	1
(Australia) J-P Smith	7	4	6
WC	(Canada) B Schnur	6^{2}	6^{6}
Q	(Germany) T Pütz	7^{7}	7^{8}
4	(Belgium) R Bemelmans	6	7
Q	(United Kingdom) L Broady	4	5
(France) G Sakharov	6	7
6	(United States) T Sandgren	3	5

Quarterfinals
(Australia) J-P Smith	6^{1}	7^{7}	6
Q	(Germany) T Pütz	7^{7}	6^{5}	3
4	(Belgium) R Bemelmans	6	6^{5}	7^{7}
(France) G Sakharov	4	7^{7}	6^{5}

Semifinals
(Australia) J-P Smith	4	1
4	(Belgium) R Bemelmans	6	6

=== Bottom half ===
First round
5	(France) V Millot	7^{7}	1	1
Alt	(United States) D Nguyen	6^{4}	6	6
(Belgium) M Authom	5	1^{r}
(Slovenia) B Rola	7	3
(United Kingdom) E Corrie	4	3
(Canada) D Shapovalov	6	6
(Italy) A Arnaboldi	6^{1}	7^{7}	1
3	(France) Q Halys	7^{7}	6^{2}	6
8	(Netherlands) I Sijsling	1	4
(Australia) A De Minaur	6	6
Q	(Germany) M Bachinger	6	4	1
(United States) M McDonald	0	6	6
WC	(Canada) F Auger-Aliassime	6	3	7
Q	(Switzerland) A Bossel	2	6	5
Alt	(France) G Barrère	4	6	3
2/Alt	(Canada) P Polansky	6	3	6

Second round
Alt	(United States) D Nguyen	2	1
(Slovenia) B Rola	6	6
(Canada) D Shapovalov	4
3	(France) Q Halys	1^{r}
(Australia) A De Minaur	6	6
(United States) M McDonald	4	1
WC	(Canada) F Auger-Aliassime	6	6
2/Alt	(Canada) P Polansky	3	4

Quarterfinals
(Slovenia) B Rola	6^{6}	4
(Canada) D Shapovalov	7^{8}	6
(Australia) A De Minaur	5	3
WC	(Canada) F Auger-Aliassime	7	6

Semifinals
(Canada) D Shapovalov	7	6
WC	(Canada) F Auger-Aliassime	5	3
