= 2018 MercedesCup =

- Date: 11–17 June
- Edition: 41st
- Category: ATP World Tour 250 series
- Draw: 28S / 16D
- Prize money: €656,015
- Surface: Grass
- Location: Stuttgart, Germany
- Venue: Tennis Club Weissenhof

Champions

Singles
- (Switzerland) Roger Federer

Doubles
- (Germany) Philipp Petzschner / (Germany) Tim Pütz
- Stuttgart Open

The 2018 MercedesCup was a men's tennis tournament played on outdoor grass courts. It was the 41st edition of the Stuttgart Open, and part of the ATP World Tour 250 series of the 2018 ATP World Tour. It was held at the Tennis Club Weissenhof in Stuttgart, Germany, from 11 June until 17 June 2018. First-seeded Roger Federer regained the ATP no. 1 singles ranking by reaching the final.

== Finals ==
=== Singles ===
(Switzerland) Roger Federer defeated (Canada) Milos Raonic, 6–4, 7–6^{(7–3)}

- It was Federer's 3rd singles title of the year and the 98th of his career.

=== Doubles ===
(Germany) Philipp Petzschner / (Germany) Tim Pütz defeated (Sweden) Robert Lindstedt / (Poland) Marcin Matkowski, 7–6^{(7–5)}, 6–3

== Singles main draw entrants ==
=== Seeds ===
Country	Player	Rank^{1}	Seeds
SUI	Roger Federer	2	1
FRA	Lucas Pouille	16	2
CZE	Tomáš Berdych	20	3
AUS	Nick Kyrgios	23	4
GER	Philipp Kohlschreiber	24	5
CAN	Denis Shapovalov	25	6
CAN	Milos Raonic	28	7
ESP	Feliciano López	33	8

- ^{1} Rankings are as of May 28, 2018

=== Other entrants ===
The following players received wildcards into the singles main draw:

- (Czech Republic) Tomáš Berdych
- (Germany) Yannick Maden
- (Germany) Rudolf Molleker

The following players received entry from the qualifying draw:

- (India) Prajnesh Gunneswaran
- (United States) Denis Kudla
- (Italy) Matteo Viola
- (Russia) Mikhail Youzhny

The following player received entry as a lucky loser:

- (Croatia) Viktor Galović

=== Withdrawals ===
Before the tournament

- (Italy) Marco Cecchinato → replaced by (Uzbekistan) Denis Istomin
- (Germany) Peter Gojowczyk → replaced by (Croatia) Viktor Galović
- (South Korea) Chung Hyeon → replaced by (Germany) Maximilian Marterer
- (Spain) David Ferrer → replaced by (Bosnia and Herzegovina) Mirza Bašić
- (France) Gaël Monfils → replaced by (Germany) Florian Mayer

=== Retirements ===
- (Serbia) Viktor Troicki

== Doubles main draw entrants ==
=== Seeds ===
Country	Player	Country	Player	Rank^{1}	Seed
PAK	Aisam-ul-Haq Qureshi	NED	Jean-Julien Rojer	44	1
JPN	Ben McLachlan	GER	Jan-Lennard Struff	60	2
BLR	Max Mirnyi	AUT	Philipp Oswald	83	3
BRA	Marcelo Demoliner	ESP	Feliciano López	86	4

- Rankings are as of May 28, 2018

=== Other entrants ===
The following pairs received wildcards into the doubles main draw:

- (Germany) Matthias Bachinger / (Germany) Yannick Maden
- (Germany) Philipp Petzschner / (Germany) Tim Pütz
