= 2018 Challenger Banque Nationale de Drummondville =

- Date: March 13–18
- Edition: 12th
- Category: ATP Challenger Tour
- Prize money: US$75,000
- Surface: Hard (indoor)
- Location: Drummondville, Canada
- Venue: Tennis intérieur René-Verrier

Champions

Singles
- (United States) Denis Kudla

Doubles
- (Belgium) Joris De Loore / (Denmark) Frederik Nielsen
- Challenger de Drummondville

The 2018 Challenger Banque Nationale de Drummondville was a professional tennis tournament played on indoor hard courts. It was the 12th edition of the tournament and part of the 2018 ATP Challenger Tour, offering a total of $75,000 in prize money. It took place in Drummondville, Canada between March 13 and March 18, 2018.

== Singles main-draw entrants ==
=== Seeds ===
Country	Player	Rank^{1}	Seed
CAN	Vasek Pospisil	75	1
SUI	Henri Laaksonen	125	2
FRA	Gleb Sakharov	158	3
GBR	Liam Broady	164	4
USA	Denis Kudla	168	5
CAN	Filip Peliwo	186	6
USA	Evan King	200	7
CAN	Brayden Schnur	202	8

- ^{1} Rankings are as of March 5, 2018

=== Other entrants ===
The following players received wildcards into the singles main draw:

- (Canada) Pavel Krainik
- (Canada) Jack Mingjie Lin
- (Canada) Samuel Monette
- (Canada) Benjamin Sigouin

The following players entered the singles main draw with a protected ranking:

- (Canada) Frank Dancevic
- (Poland) Michał Przysiężny

The following players received entry as alternates:

- (Belgium) Joris De Loore
- (Colombia) Alejandro González
- (South Africa) Nicolaas Scholtz

The following players received entry from the qualifying draw:

- (France) Antoine Escoffier
- (Colombia) Alejandro Gómez
- (South Africa) Ruan Roelofse
- (Australia) Aleksandar Vukic

The following players received entry as lucky losers:

- (United States) JC Aragone
- (United States) Jared Hiltzik

== Champions ==
=== Singles ===
- (United States) Denis Kudla def. (France) Benjamin Bonzi, 6–0, 7–5

=== Doubles ===
- (Belgium) Joris De Loore / (Denmark) Frederik Nielsen def. (Venezuela) Luis David Martínez / (Canada) Filip Peliwo, 6–4, 6–3
