= Denis Shapovalov =

Canadian tennis player (born 1999)

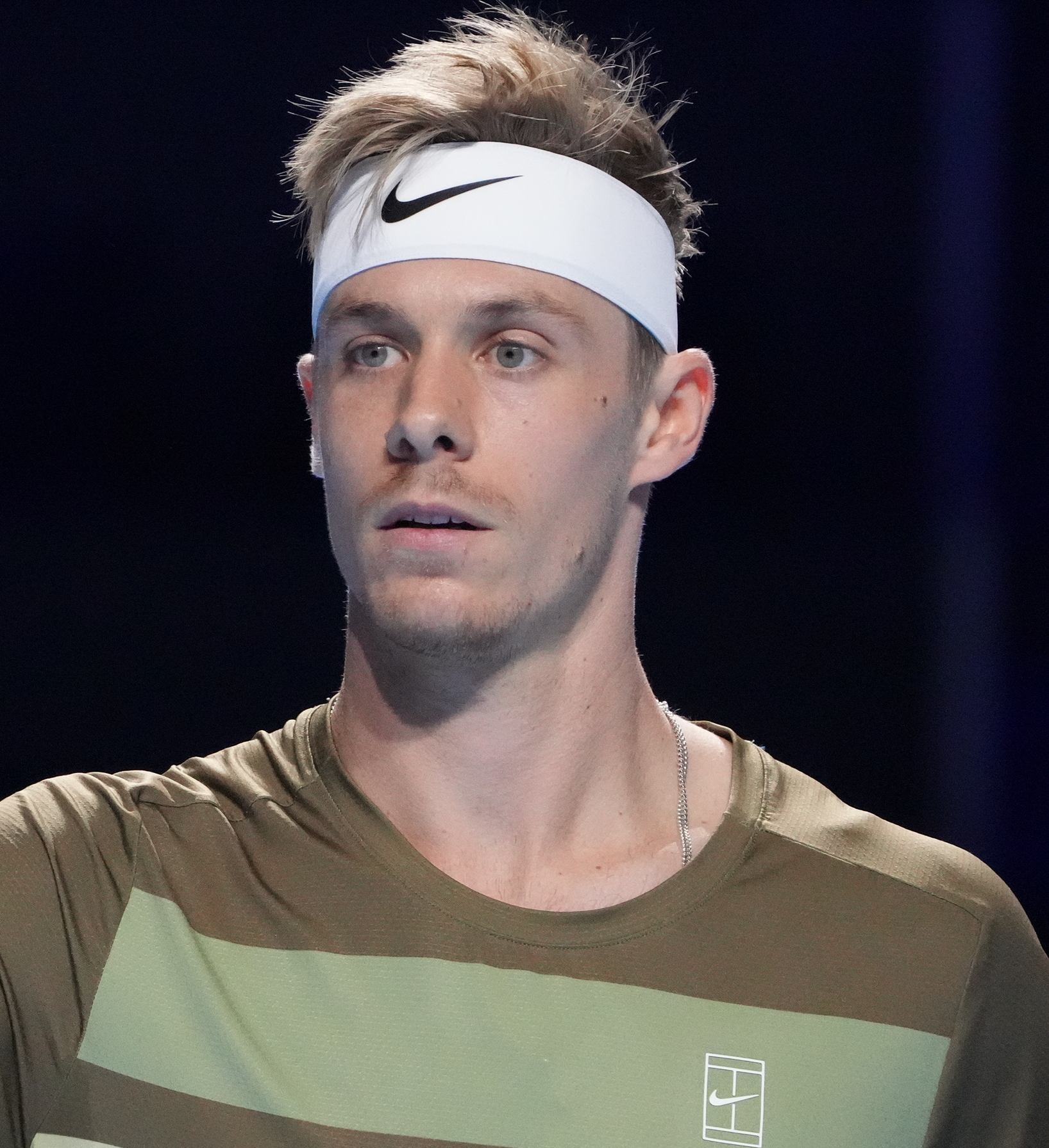
- Shapovalov at the 2025 Swiss Indoors
- Full name: Denis Viktorovich Shapovalov
- Native name: Денис Викторович Шаповалов
- Country (sports): Canada
- Residence: Nassau, Bahamas
- Born: April 15, 1999 (age 27) Tel Aviv, Israel
- Height: 1.85 m (6 ft 1 in)
- Turned pro: 2017
- Plays: Left-handed (one-handed backhand)
- Coach: Mirjam Björklund (Feb 2026-), Mikael Tillström (Jun 2025-Feb 2026), Janko Tipsarević (Nov 2024–May 2025)
- Prize money: US$ 14,917,865

Singles
- Career record: 239–201
- Career titles: 4
- Highest ranking: No. 10 (September 21, 2020)
- Current ranking: No. 50 (November 9, 2026)

Grand Slam singles results
- Australian Open: QF (2022)
- French Open: 3R (2023, 2024)
- Wimbledon: SF (2021)
- US Open: QF (2020)

Doubles
- Career record: 62–59
- Career titles: 0
- Highest ranking: No. 44 (February 24, 2020)
- Current ranking: No. 354 (April 13, 2026)

Grand Slam doubles results
- Australian Open: 2R (2021)
- French Open: 1R (2020)
- US Open: QF (2020)

Team competitions
- Davis Cup: W (2022); Record: 13–9
- Last updated on: April 13, 2026.

Denis Viktorovich Shapovalov (Note: /ˌʃɑːpəˈvɑːləv, -ləf/ SHAH-pə-VAH-ləv, -ləf; Russian: Денис Викторович Шаповалов, pronounced [dʲɪˈnʲis ˈvʲiktərəvʲɪtɕ ʂəpɐˈvaləf]; Hebrew: דניס ויקטורוביץ׳ שפובלוב.) (born April 15, 1999) is a Canadian professional tennis player. He has been ranked as high as world No. 10 in singles by the ATP, achieved on September 21, 2020, and a doubles ranking of No. 44, achieved on February 24, 2020. He has won four ATP Tour singles titles and produced his best Grand Slam performance at the 2021 Wimbledon Championships, where he reached the semifinals. Shapovalov is the third highest-ranked Canadian singles male player in history behind Milos Raonic (world No. 3 in 2016) and Félix Auger-Aliassime (world No. 4 in 2026).

As a junior, he ranked as high as No. 2 in the world. He won two junior Grand Slam titles, his first being the doubles title at the 2015 US Open with Auger-Aliassime and his second being the singles title at the 2016 Wimbledon Championships. As a professional, Shapovalov broke into the top 100 for the first time in 2017 after making the semi-finals of the 2017 Canadian Open; at the age of 18, he became the youngest player ever to reach the semi-final of an ATP Masters 1000 tournament. The next year, Shapovalov continued his success with a second Masters semi-final appearance at the 2018 Madrid Open and ended the year ranked inside the top 30, making him the youngest player in the group. In 2019, Shapovalov won his first ATP title at the 2019 Stockholm Open and made his first Masters finals appearance at the 2019 Paris Masters, after which he ended the year ranked No. 15. For 2020, Shapovalov reached his maiden Grand Slam quarter-final at the 2020 US Open and his fourth Masters semi-final at the 2020 Italian Open, taking him to his career-high ranking of world No. 10. He made two more tour final appearances in 2021.

With partner Rohan Bopanna, Shapovalov has also succeeded in doubles at the Grand Slam level, having reached his first quarter-final at the 2020 US Open, and the Masters level after making five quarter-finals and one semi-final. Together, they also reached their first doubles final at the 2019 Stuttgart Open, which brought Shapovalov past Adil Shamasdin to become the No. 1 Canadian doubles player. After their quarter-final appearance at the 2019 Paris Masters, he entered the top 50 in doubles for the first time. A left-handed player with a one-handed backhand, Shapovalov plays an aggressive, high-risk ground game and has some of the strongest groundstrokes on the tour, complemented by his powerful forehand and serve. He also often plays serve-and-volley to quick endpoints, which has rewarded him on faster surfaces. In recognition of his breakout tennis success in 2017, his peers on the ATP Tour voted him as the ATP Most Improved Player and ATP Star of Tomorrow. That same year, he was also awarded the Lionel Conacher Award as Canada's male athlete of the year, making him the second tennis player to have won the award since its inception in 1932.

== Early life ==
Denis Viktorovich Shapovalov was born in Tel Aviv, Israel. His mother Tessa Shapovalova was born in Soviet Ukraine, and is a former tennis player in Israel who also played for the USSR national tennis team. She immigrated from the USSR to Tel Aviv, Israel, along with Denis' father Viktor Shapovalov during the Collapse of the Soviet Union. She eventually became a tennis coach in Vaughan, Ontario. His mother and her family are Ashkenazi Jewish (Ukrainian-Jewish), and his father's family is of Russian Orthodox Christian background. Shapovalov has one sibling, an older brother named Evgeniy, who was also born in Israel.

The family emigrated from Israel to Canada, prior to Denis' first birthday. He then resided in Vaughan, Ontario. He started playing tennis at the Richmond Hill Country Club, where his mother got a job as a coach two weeks after arriving in Toronto from Tel Aviv. Denis began playing tennis at age 5 and quickly became obsessed with the game. When it became difficult to get Denis enough time on the Richmond Hill club's courts, his mother left her job there and eventually opened her tennis academy in Vaughan, named TessaTennis, to help give him a home base to train and to teach the game to other juniors. Shapovalov attended Stephen Lewis Secondary School in Vaughan. He is nicknamed "Shapo" or "Deni".

== Career ==
=== Juniors ===
When Shapovalov was 13, his training needs were too much for his mother to handle on her own. It was at this point that the family hired Adriano Fuorivia, a former manager of tennis development for Tennis Canada, to be his coach and travel with Shapovalov while his parents stayed home to run the academy. The relationship between Shapovalov and Adriano lasted four years, and included numerous junior and ITF futures titles, including the 2015 US Open Junior Doubles title and the 2016 Wimbledon Junior Singles title. In October 2013, Shapovalov won his first junior singles title at the ITF G5 in Burlington, Ontario. He captured his second singles title in April 2014 at the ITF G5 in Burlington. In July 2014, Shapovalov won the singles and doubles titles at the ITF G4 in San José. At the US Open in September 2015, he qualified in singles and made it to the third round for his second straight Grand Slam. In doubles, he won the title with partner Félix Auger-Aliassime. In October 2015, Shapovalov and fellow Canadians Félix Auger-Aliassime and Benjamin Sigouin captured the first Junior Davis Cup title for Canada in its history. At the French Open in May 2016, he advanced to the semi-finals in singles and the second round in doubles. At the beginning of July 2016, he captured his first G1 singles title after winning in Roehampton. A week later, Shapovalov became the third Canadian to win a junior Grand Slam singles title with a three-set victory over Alex de Minaur at the 2016 Wimbledon Championships. He also reached the doubles final with Félix Auger-Aliassime.

As a junior, he compiled a singles win-loss record of 86–32.

=== 2015–16: Early years ===
In late November 2015, Shapovalov won his first professional doubles title at the ITF Futures in Pensacola. In January 2016, he reached the doubles final at the ITF Futures in Sunrise. A week later, he captured his first professional singles title with a straight-set victory over Pedro Sakamoto at the ITF Futures in Weston. In March 2016, he reached the semi-finals of the Challenger Banque Nationale de Drummondville, beating his first top 100 player in Austin Krajicek before losing to Daniel Evans in three sets.

In April 2016, Shapovalov won his second and third singles titles after defeating world No. 286 Tennys Sandgren at the ITF 25K in Memphis and winning the ITF 10K in Orange Park over Miomir Kecmanović two weeks later. He also won the doubles title in Orange Park. In July 2016, Shapovalov was awarded a wildcard for the tournament in Washington, his first ATP main draw appearance. He was defeated by Lukáš Lacko in three sets. Shapovalov then was awarded a wildcard for the 2016 Rogers Cup the next week. In the first round, he upset world No. 19 Nick Kyrgios, beating him in three sets to win his first tour-level match. He was defeated by No. 40 Grigor Dimitrov in straight sets in the next round.

=== 2017: Canadian Open semifinal, top 50 debut ===
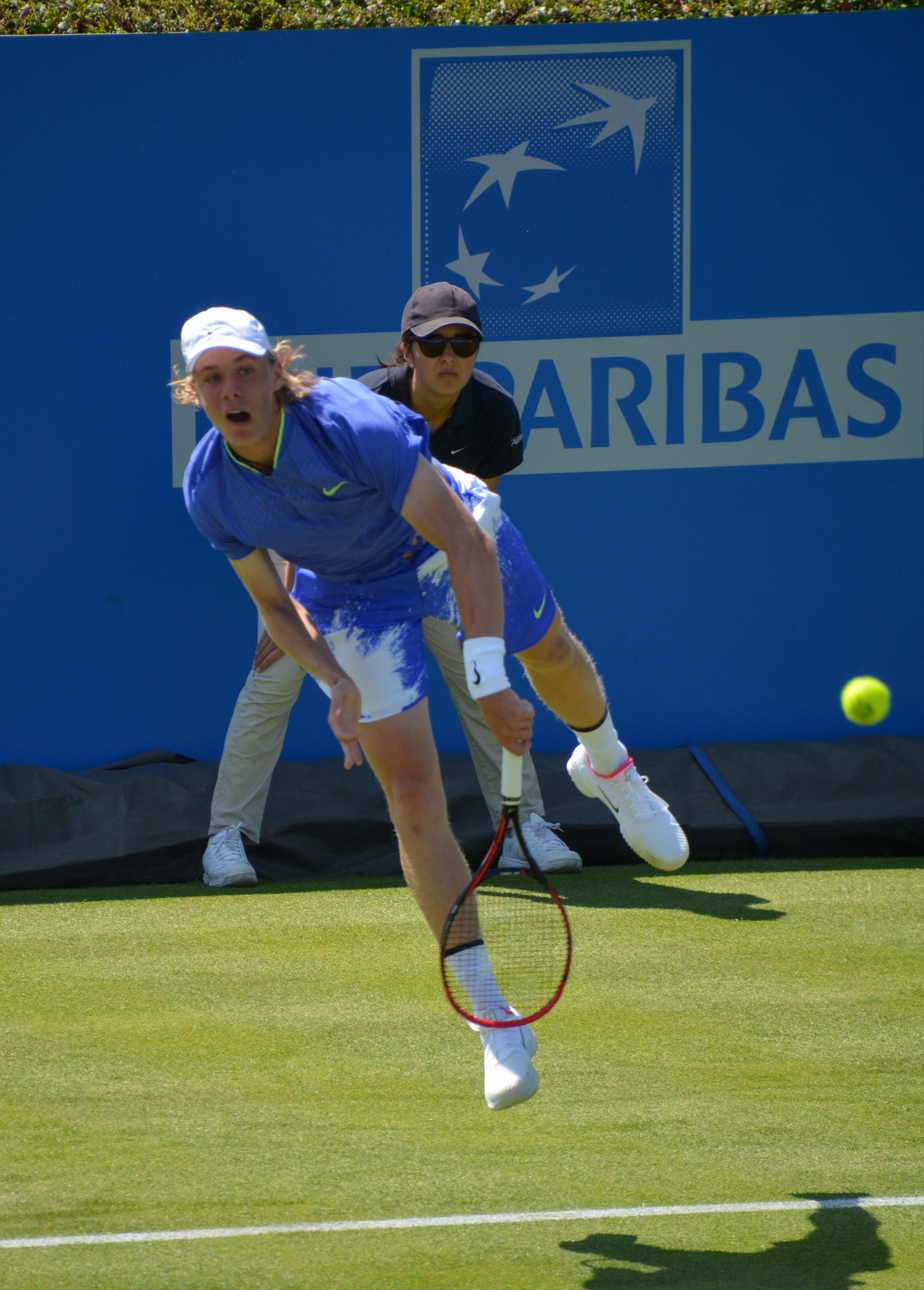
Shapovalov at the 2017 Queen's Club Championships

In February 2017, Shapovalov was selected to play for the Canada Davis Cup team in the World Group 1st round tie against Great Britain, and lost his opener to Dan Evans. In the deciding rubber against Kyle Edmund, he accidentally hit the chair umpire, Arnaud Gabas, in the eye after launching a ball aimlessly towards the crowd in anger after dropping serve in the opening stages of the third set, leading to immediate disqualification for unsportsmanlike behaviour, and as a result, Great Britain won the tie 3–2.

In March in Gatineau, Shapovalov captured his fourth ITF Futures singles title after defeating Gleb Sakharov in straight sets. Two weeks later, he won his first ATP Challenger title with a victory over Ruben Bemelmans at the 75K in Drummondville, and was the youngest Canadian to win a Challenger until Félix Auger-Aliassime's victory at the Open Sopra Steria de Lyon later in the year. The next week, he was defeated by Mirza Bašić in the final of the ATP Challenger 50K in Guadalajara, stopping his winning streak at 17 matches. At the French Open in May, his first professional Grand Slam, he was defeated in the first round of qualifying by the first seed Marius Copil in three sets. In June, Shapovalov qualified for the ATP 500 at the Queen's Club Championships, his fourth ATP main draw but his first as a qualifier. In the first round, he defeated his second top 50 player, world No. 47 Kyle Edmund, before losing to world No. 14 Tomáš Berdych.

At Wimbledon in July, Shapovalov made his Grand Slam debut after he was awarded a wildcard for the main draw. He was defeated by Jerzy Janowicz in the opening round. At the end of the month, he won his second ATP Challenger title, defeating compatriot Peter Polansky in the final of the 75K in Gatineau.

Shapovalov experienced a significant breakthrough in August at the Canadian Open, defeating Rogério Dutra Silva for his second Masters 1000 win, then he defeated world No. 31 Juan Martín del Potro in the second round and world No. 2 Rafael Nadal in the next round, which was his first-ever match against a top 10 player. He went on to defeat world No. 42 Adrian Mannarino in the quarter-finals before bowing out to world No. 8 Alexander Zverev in the semi-finals, thus becoming the youngest player ever to reach an ATP World Tour Masters 1000 semi-final.

Despite his achievements at the Rogers Cup, Shapovalov had to qualify to enter the main draw of the US Open. In the qualifying rounds, he defeated Denis Kudla, Gastão Elias, and Jan Šátral. In the main draw, Shapovalov defeated Daniil Medvedev in the first round, then No. 8 seed Jo-Wilfried Tsonga in the second. He reached the fourth round by defeating Kyle Edmund in four sets, becoming the youngest player to reach the fourth round since Michael Chang in 1989. He was defeated by world No. 19 Pablo Carreño Busta in the fourth round, after which he reached his then career-high ATP ranking of world No. 51 on September 11, 2017.

Shapovalov was offered a wildcard to the main draw of the Shanghai Masters in October where he lost in the first round to Viktor Troicki in three sets. He also lost in the first round of the Paris Masters two weeks later to Julien Benneteau. In November, Shapovalov competed in the inaugural Next Generation ATP Finals along with seven other top singles players aged 21 and under. Seeded third, Shapovalov finished third in his Group with a record of one win and two losses in round robin play, which was not enough to qualify for the semifinals.

=== 2018: Top 30 debut ===
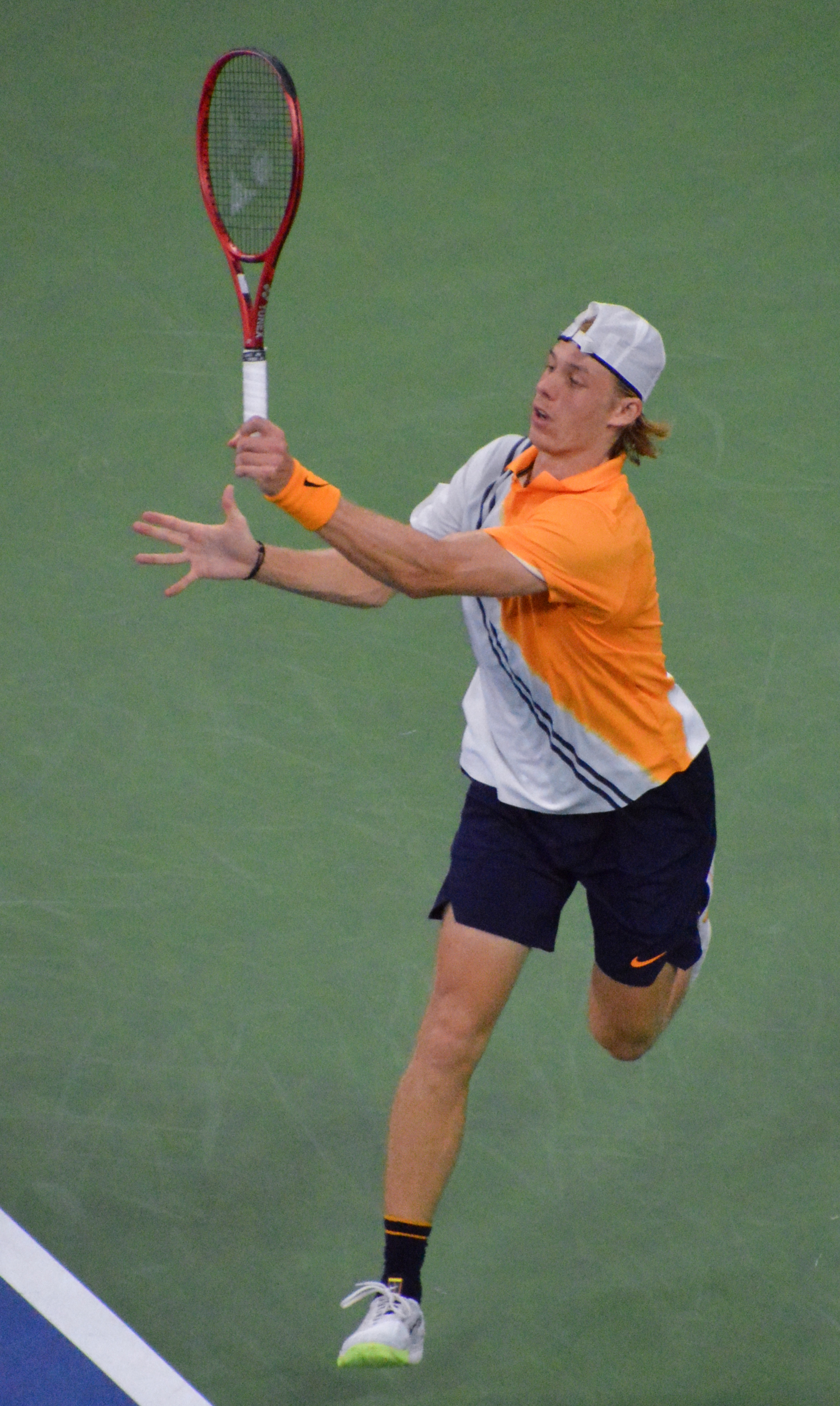
Shapovalov at the 2018 US Open

Shapovalov began his 2018 season at the Brisbane International, where he lost in the first round in both singles, to Kyle Edmund, and doubles, to eventual winners Henri Kontinen and John Peers. At the ASB Classic, he defeated Rogério Dutra Silva in the opening round but was knocked out in the second round to second seed Juan Martín del Potro in straight sets. At the Australian Open, Shapovalov won his first round match over Stefanos Tsitsipas in straight sets, but lost in the next round to Jo-Wilfried Tsonga in five sets despite leading Tsonga 5–2 in the deciding set.

Shapovalov then made his debut at the Delray Beach Open where he reached the semi-finals. He defeated Ivo Karlović, Jared Donaldson, and Taylor Fritz in the first three rounds, before falling to eventual champion Frances Tiafoe. The next week at the Mexican Open, Shapovalov defeated former world No. 4 Kei Nishikori in three sets in the first round but lost to world No. 6 Dominic Thiem in the second round. Shapovalov started his March campaign making his debut at Indian Wells, defeating qualifier Ričardas Berankis in the opening round. He lost however to 30th seed Pablo Cuevas in the second round. At the Miami Open, he defeated Viktor Troicki, world No. 30 Damir Džumhur, and world No. 14 Sam Querrey in the first three rounds. He was defeated by Borna Ćorić in the fourth round.

Shapovalov started off his maiden clay court season at the Monte-Carlo Masters, where he lost in straight sets to qualifier Stefanos Tsitsipas in the first round. At his second clay court tournament, the Hungarian Open, he once again lost in the first round, this time to Nikoloz Basilashvili. At the Madrid Open, he defeated Tennys Sandgren and Benoît Paire, before knocking out compatriot Milos Raonic to reach the quarter-finals. He then defeated Kyle Edmund to become the youngest semi-finalist in Madrid Open history. He subsequently lost in straight sets to world No. 3 and eventual champion Alexander Zverev. Shapovalov's victories here were his first on a clay surface and propelled him to the ATP Top 30 for the first time in his career. He became the youngest top-30 player since Richard Gasquet in 2005. The following week at the Italian Open, Shapovalov beat Tomáš Berdych in three sets and Robin Haase also in three sets to set up a rematch with Rafael Nadal in the third round. With the win over Berdych, he became Canada's new number one in singles. He was defeated by Nadal in straight sets. Shapovalov continued the momentum at the French Open defeating John Millman in straight sets in the first round, but lost to Maximilian Marterer in the next round.

Shapovalov next entered the Stuttgart Open, his first tournament of the season on grass, but lost in the first round to qualifier Prajnesh Gunneswaran. The next week at the Queen's Club Championships, he lost again in the opening round this time to Gilles Müller. Despite the struggles, Shapovalov entered the Eastbourne Championships. Seeded third, he defeated Jared Donaldson in his second-round match only to lose to Mischa Zverev in the quarter-finals. In his first ever appearance at Wimbledon, Shapovalov won his first round match by defeating Jérémy Chardy, but lost to Benoît Paire in the next round after taking the first set 6–0.

Shapovalov started the 2018 North American summer hard court swing leading up to the US Open seeded 9th at the Citi Open in Washington, D.C., where he defeated Daniil Medvedev before losing to 7th seed Kei Nishikori in the quarter-finals. The following week Shapovalov returned home to Toronto and the Rogers Cup, the tournament where he experienced his 2017 ATP World Tour semi-final breakthrough. Shapovalov handily defeated Jérémy Chardy and fiery Italian Fabio Fognini in straight sets, before being knocked out of his home tournament in the Round of 16 by Robin Haase. In his first appearance at the Cincinnati Masters on August 13, Shapovalov defeated fellow NextGen ATP up and comer Frances Tiafoe and frequent opponent Kyle Edmund, before going down in the Round of 16 to fellow countryman Milos Raonic, who avenged his loss to Shapovalov during their maiden meeting at the Madrid Open in May.

In his second US Open appearance, 28th seed Shapovalov encountered long-time friend and fellow Canadian Félix Auger-Aliassime in a highly anticipated first-round match-up. After the two split the first two sets, Auger-Aliassime was forced to retire from the match. Shapovalov then defeated Andreas Seppi in a five-set marathon in the next round, but then fell in the round of 32 to 5th seed Kevin Anderson in another five-set match that lasted close to four hours.

=== 2019: First ATP title, ATP 1000 final ===
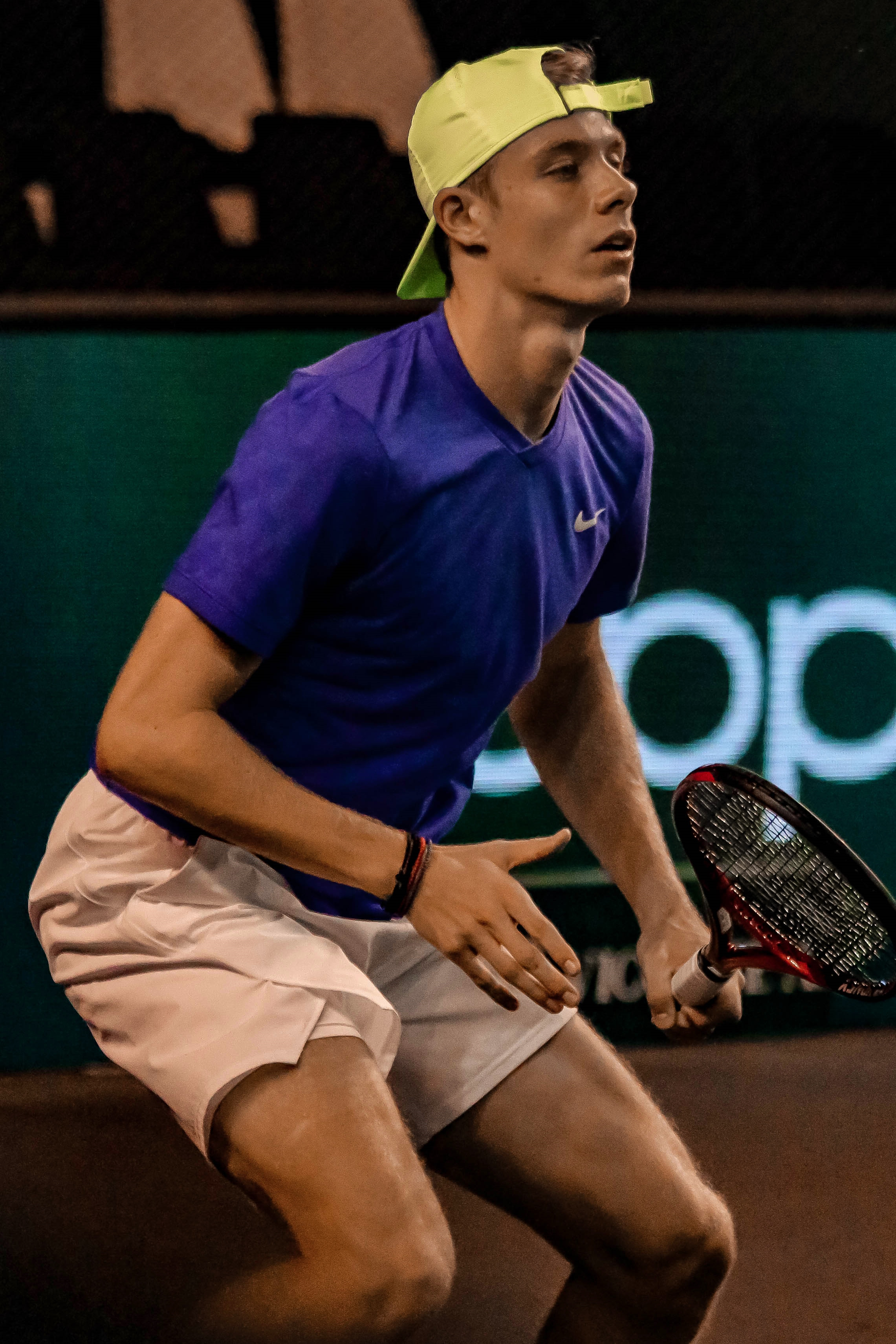
Shapovalov at the 2019 Paris Masters

Shapovalov began his 2019 season at the Auckland Open, where seeded seventh, he was defeated by João Sousa in three sets. At the Australian Open, he defeated Pablo Andújar and Taro Daniel before being stopped in four sets by six-time and eventual champion Novak Djokovic in their first singles match. His next tournament saw him out in straight sets to Pierre-Hughes Herbert in the quarter-finals. He was also knocked out in the quarter-finals of the Rotterdam Open, but was able to defeat perennial Top-10 player Tomáš Berdych before being defeated by former champion Stan Wawrinka. After a dismal opening loss to Mikhail Kukushkin in the Open 13, Shapovalov turned his attention to Indian Wells. He defeated former U.S. Open champion Marin Čilić before being stopped by Hubert Hurkacz in the Round of 16. His Miami Open campaign was more fruitful as he was able to defeat fellow NextGen players Stefanos Tsitsipas and Frances Tiafoe on the way to the semi-finals. Although he and fellow Canadian Félix Auger-Aliassime were semi-finalists and had a chance to face off in the finals, both were defeated by veteran champions; Auger-Aliassime by defending champion John Isner, and Shapovalov by eventual champion Roger Federer in their first singles match. This propelled him for the first time to Top 20 in the world. On 20 October 2019, Shapovalov won his first ATP title at the Stockholm Open, defeating Filip Krajinović in straight sets. At the Paris Masters, the tour's final tournament of the year, Shapovalov secured a top 20 year-end finish after beating Gilles Simon, Fabio Fognini, Alexander Zverev, and Gaël Monfils to reach the semi-finals. There, due to a last-minute retirement from Rafael Nadal, he reached his first Masters 1000 final, where he lost to Novak Djokovic in straight sets. He finished the season at a career-high ranking of number 15.

In the 2019 Davis Cup Finals, Shapovalov and Vasek Pospisil teamed up to single-handedly take Canada to its first-ever Davis Cup final in the 119-year history of the event, defeating Russia, Australia, the United States, and Italy en route to the finals.

=== 2020: First major quarter-final, top 10 ===
Shapovalov began his 2020 at the ATP Cup in Brisbane, where he was the No. 1 player for Team Canada and pitted against the Greek, Australian, and German teams in Group F. In his first match, Shapovalov beat Greece's Stefanos Tsitsipas in straight tie-break sets. He and compatriot Félix Auger-Aliassime later defeated the Greek duo of Michail Pervolarakis and Petros Tsitsipas to bring Canada to a 3–0 record over Greece. Next, Shapovalov met Australia's Alex de Minaur, and despite being a set and a break up, he lost the match in three sets. In his last round-robin match, Shapovalov beat Germany's Alexander Zverev in straight sets, giving up just four games. Together with Auger-Aliassime, they also beat German doubles team Kevin Krawietz and Andreas Mies to take Canada through to the quarter-finals as Group F's runner-up. There, he faced Serbia's Novak Djokovic but he was ousted in three sets, and Canada was eventually eliminated from the tournament. Following the defeat, Shapovalov headed to the ATP Auckland Open as the second seed and defeated compatriot Vasek Pospisil in straight sets, but lost to eventual champion Ugo Humbert in straight sets in the quarter-finals after double faulting on the first set point and on match point. Shapovalov concluded the year's Australian swing as the thirteenth seed at the Australian Open, but he suffered a disappointing exit in the first round at the hands of Márton Fucsovics in four sets.

Three weeks later, in February, Shapovalov embarked on the European indoor hard court swing and entered the Open Sud de France as the third seed. He faced Pospisil in his first match there in the second round, but lost in straight sets. Then, he entered the Rotterdam Open as the eighth seed, and again, lost his first match there in straight sets, this time to Grigor Dimitrov in the first round. But in the doubles tournament in Rotterdam, Shapovalov performed better, having reached the semi-finals with partner Bopanna after toppling fourth seeds Jean-Julien Rojer and Horia Tecău in the quarter-finals before losing to finalists Henri Kontinen and Jan-Lennard Struff. Shapovalov entered the Open 13 next as the fourth seed and snapped his three-match losing streak after fending off Marin Čilić in three sets in the second round to reach the quarter-finals and join Auger-Aliassime and Pospisil, making it the first time three Canadian men had reached the quarter-finals of an ATP Tour tournament together since 1990. However, he lost to Alexander Bublik in three sets after converting just two of ten break points he had on Bublik's serve while only saving six of nine on his own. He and Bopanna also reached the quarter-finals of the doubles tournament after beating Jannik Sinner and Simone Bolelli, but the duo lost to Frederik Nielsen and Tim Pütz.

After a six-month suspension of the 2020 ATP Tour due to the COVID-19 pandemic, Shapovalov entered into the first tournament to return, the Cincinnati Masters. The twelfth seed beat Čilić in straight sets in the first round, but lost to Struff in the second round in three sets. Next, Shapovalov embarked on the US Open as the twelfth seed. He fought off Sebastian Korda in the first round and Kwon Soon-woo in the second round, both in four sets. In the third round, Shapovalov prevented nineteenth seed Taylor Fritz from serving for the match in the fourth set and sealed the match in the fifth set to reach the fourth round and match his best performance at the major. By doing so, he joined Auger-Aliassime and Pospisil to make it the first occasion three Canadian men had reached the second week of a major. He encountered seventh seed David Goffin in the fourth round; after losing the first set tiebreak 0–7, he gained the momentum of the match by converting his first break point in the second set and opening the third set with another break. He then closed the fourth set and the match by breaking Goffin's serve on match point to reach his first major quarter-final. The victory made him the first Canadian man to appear in the quarter-finals of the US Open in the Open Era. There, he faced twentieth seed Pablo Carreño Busta; after sealing the first set, Shapovalov lost the next two in tie-breaks and gave his opponent a bagel in the fourth set before he double-faulted on a breakpoint in the fifth set, placing him at a deficit he could not recover from, which allowed Carreño Busta to serve out the four-hour-long five-set match. Overall, Shapovalov made more winners and earned seven more points in total, but also made thirty-five more unforced errors. After the match, Shapovalov summarized, "I came out tight. I played tight in the tie-breakers. I'm sure the next time I'm in the situation, I'll be more comfortable with it." Additionally, Shapovalov and Bopanna reached their first Grand Slam doubles quarterfinal as a team after beating sixth seeds Krawietz and Mies in the second round. The duo ultimately lost in straight sets to semi-finalists Rojer and Tecau.

Moving onto the year's postponed clay swing beginning in late September, Shapovalov embarked on the Italian Open as the twelfth seed. After defeating Guido Pella and Pedro Martínez in straight sets, he faced his first three-set challenge in Humbert and was able to close the match after he lost the first set in a tiebreak. The win earned Shapovalov his first quarter-final appearance at the tournament, where he faced Dimitrov, and in three sets, he notched his first career win against his opponent and landed in the semi-finals. His semi-finals match pitted him against Diego Schwartzman, and after a final set with six total service breaks between both players, Shapovalov lost the deciding set tiebreak and thus, the match, after he had initially served for it at 5–4. Shapovalov also played the doubles tournament with Bopanna and the pair made the quarter-finals after notching an upset win over top seeds Juan Sebastián Cabal and Robert Farah. In the quarter-finals, the team lost to eventual finalists Jérémy Chardy and Fabrice Martin. Upon the conclusion of the tournament, Shapovalov made his top 10 debut in the ATP singles rankings by moving up four spots and reaching a new career-high of No. 10. He closed out the year's clay swing with his third bid at a major in the year at the French Open by defeating Gilles Simon in four sets in the first round, but losing to Roberto Carballés Baena in the second round in five sets after twice serving for the match. Following the unexpected disappointment, Shapovalov explained, "The conditions were as tough as possible for me to play against here, with the balls being just so heavy and it being really cold."

In the abbreviated year's final swing, Shapovalov took on four last indoor tournaments in Europe to close out his season. Among them, he found his best success at his first venture, the St. Petersburg Open. The second seed reached the semi-finals without dropping a set and passed through Viktor Troicki, Ilya Ivashka, and Stan Wawrinka before he lost to eventual champion Andrey Rublev in three sets. Next, just three weeks after their prior encounter, Shapovalov faced a rematch against Simon at the Bett1Hulks Championship in his first match at the tournament, but the third seed lost this time after a poor serving performance that included thirteen double faults. Shapovalov ended the season with two more first-match losses, with the first at the Vienna Open to Jurij Rodionov in straight sets, and the second at the Sofia Open to Radu Albot in straight sets as well, despite being the top seed, a first for him in his career at a tournament. Throughout the final run of tournaments to close out the year, Shapovalov was bidding to cement a position among the lineup for the 2020 ATP Finals, but the three consecutive early defeats ultimately kept him as an alternate for the field. He ended the year ranked No. 12.

=== 2021: First major semifinal ===
Shapovalov started his season at the ATP Cup, where he lost to Serbia's Novak Djokovic and to Germany's Alexander Zverev. At the Australian Open, he beat Jannik Sinner and Bernard Tomic before losing to Félix Auger-Aliassime in the third round. In March, Shapovalov entered the Qatar Open, where he beat Vasek Pospisil in straight sets before losing to Taylor Fritz in the quarter-finals. At the Dubai Tennis Championships, he reached the semi-finals but fell to qualifier Lloyd Harris. Entering the Miami Open as the sixth seed, Shapovalov lost in the third round to eventual champion Hubert Hurkacz.

In the clay season, Shapovalov began at the Barcelona Open, where he lost to Auger-Aliassime in the third round. He entered the Estoril Open as the top seed, but lost to Corentin Moutet in his first match. Shapovalov's struggles continued in Madrid when he lost to Alexander Bublik in the second round after hitting fourteen double faults, and in Rome after he lost to Rafael Nadal in the third round, despite holding two match points. In doubles, Shapovalov and Rohan Bopanna defeated top-seeded Juan Sebastián Cabal and Robert Farah in Madrid en route to the quarter-finals before they lost to Tim Pütz and Alexander Zverev. At the Geneva Open, he reached his first clay-court final, but lost to Casper Ruud in straight sets. Shapovalov issued a statement the following day, announcing his withdrawal from the French Open due to his lingering shoulder injury.

Shapovalov returned in June at the Stuttgart Open as the top seed, losing to eventual champion Marin Čilić in the quarter-finals. Next, Shapovalov played at the Queen's Club Championships, where he reached the semi-finals before he lost to Cameron Norrie.

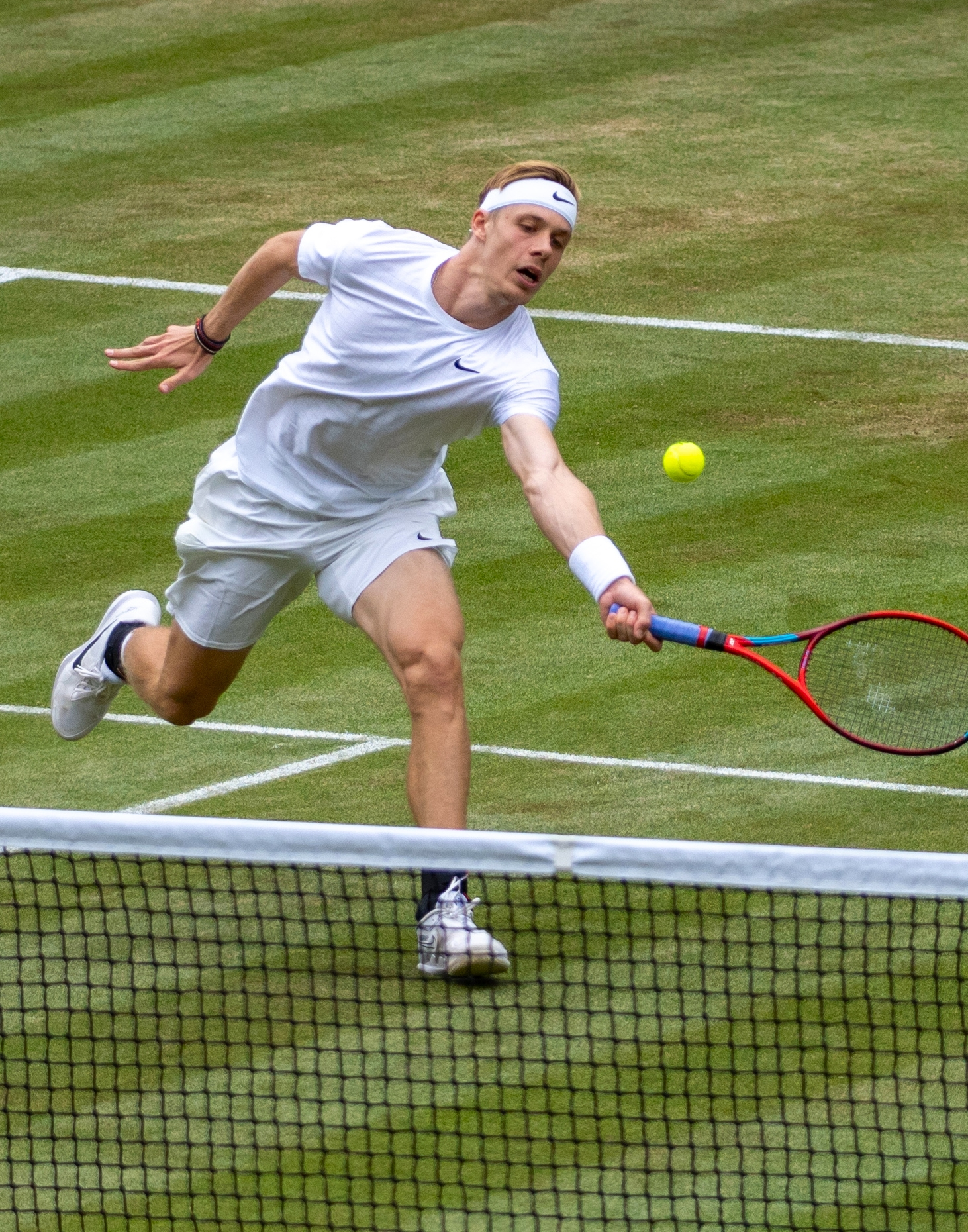
Shapovalov at the 2021 Wimbledon Championships

Seeded tenth at Wimbledon, Shapovalov reached the third round at the tournament for the first time in his career. He then defeated Andy Murray and eighth seed Roberto Bautista Agut, both in straight sets, to reach his first Wimbledon quarter-final. There, he defeated Karen Khachanov in five sets to reach his maiden major semi-final, rallying from two-sets-to-one down. There, Shapovalov faced the defending champion Novak Djokovic, losing in straight but tight sets. With his successful run at Wimbledon, Shapovalov re-entered the top 10 in rankings for the first time since September 2020.

Following Wimbledon, Shapovalov decided to skip the Tokyo Olympics, citing his concerns about the COVID-19 pandemic. He instead entered the Swiss Open as the top seed, but was upset by qualifier Vít Kopřiva in his first match there.

Shapovalov faced consecutive setbacks as he embarked on the North American hardcourt swing. He lost his opening matches at both the Canadian Open and the Cincinnati Masters, to Frances Tiafoe and Benoît Paire respectively. Heading to the US Open, Shapovalov defeated Federico Delbonis and Roberto Carballés Baena before losing to Lloyd Harris in straight sets in the third round. Following the disappointment, Shapovalov made his third appearance at the Laver Cup as a member of Team World and contributed to the team's only win over Team Europe, winning his doubles match with John Isner against Team Europe's Matteo Berrettini and Alexander Zverev. Shapovalov entered the inaugural San Diego Open as the fourth seed, defeating Taylor Fritz before a straight-sets loss to Norrie in the quarter-finals. At Indian Wells, he lost to Aslan Karatsev in the third round. However, with Bopanna, the duo made progressed in the doubles' tournament to the quarter-finals, where they lost to Karatsev and Andrey Rublev.

In the tour's closing European indoor hard court swing, Shapovalov attended the St. Petersburg Open, where he defeated Pablo Andújar before losing to Struff in the quarter-finals. In doubles, he partnered with Bopanna and toppled second seeds Raven Klaasen and Ben McLachlan before losing to fourth seeds Andrey Golubev and Hugo Nys in the semi-finals. For his last tournament of the year, Shapovalov entered the Stockholm Open as the third seed and defending champion. He reached his second final of the year following wins over Andrea Vavassori, Arthur Rinderknech, and Auger-Aliassime. There, he faced Tommy Paul, and despite saving ten break points, he lost to Paul. Shapovalov ended the year ranked No. 14.

=== 2022: Davis Cup champion, Vienna Open final ===
Prior to the start of the 2022 season, Shapovalov tested positive for COVID-19 after the Mubadala Tennis Championships, where other players also tested positive for the virus. Blaming fatigue, he withdrew from his first match at the ATP Cup. Canada progressed out of the group stage following victories over Great Britain and Germany, despite a 0–3 loss to the United States. In the semi-finals, Canada defeated Russia by winning the decisive doubles match, where Shapovalov and Félix Auger-Aliassime defeated Daniil Medvedev and Roman Safiullin in the super tiebreak. Canada then won its maiden ATP Cup title over Spain after Shapovalov and Auger-Aliassime notched singles wins over Pablo Carreño Busta and Roberto Bautista Agut.

At the Australian Open, Shapovalov defeated Laslo Đere, Kwon Soon-woo, and Reilly Opelka to reach the fourth round, where he upset third seed Alexander Zverev in straight sets to reach his first-ever Australian Open quarter-final. He then lost to Rafael Nadal in five sets. In his next tournament at the 2022 Rotterdam Open he lost in the first round against qualifier Jiří Lehečka. At the 2022 Qatar Open, Denis Shapovalov lost in straight sets to Arthur Rinderknech at the quarter-finals. He reached the semi-finals of the 2022 Dubai Tennis Championships but lost to Jiří Veselý in an epic three setter. Shapovalov was then knocked out by Reilly Opelka in the third round of the 2022 Indian Wells Masters. He was ousted by Lloyd Harris in the first round of the 2022 Miami Open. In his next tournament at the 2022 Madrid Open, Denis was stunned by Andy Murray in the second round. At the 2022 Italian Open (tennis) he defeated 10-times Rome champion and third seed Rafael Nadal to reach the quarter-finals. At the 2022 French Open he was defeated by Holger Rune in the first round.

At Wimbledon, Shapovalov lost in the second round to Brandon Nakashima in four sets. At the Cincinnati Masters, Shapovalov lost in the third round to world No. 1 Daniil Medvedev in a tough match featuring a ninth game lasting nine minutes 42 seconds. At the US Open, Shapovalov lost in the third round to Andrey Rublev in a match that took over four hours to complete, he lost in a tiebreaker for the match 10–7. After the US Open, he played in the Korea Open, where he reached the final but lost to Yoshihito Nishioka. In the following week at the ATP 500 Japan Open he reached the semifinals defeating Borna Ćorić. As a result, he moved back into the top 20 in the rankings. In the next ATP 500 tournament the 2022 Erste Bank Open in Vienna he went one step further to reach his sixth final where he lost to top seed Daniil Medvedev.

At the 2022 Davis Cup, Shapovalov teamed up with Félix Auger-Aliassime and Vasek Pospisil for Canada's first Davis Cup Finals win. Canada defeated Australia in the finals after defeating Germany and Italy.

=== 2023–24: Belgrade title, 200th career win ===
Shapovalov started his 2023 season at the Adelaide International 1. Seeded seventh, he reached the quarter-finals where he lost to top seed and eventual champion, Novak Djokovic. Seeded 20th at the Australian Open, he made it to the third round where he was defeated by 10th seed and world No. 11, Hubert Hurkacz, in five sets.

At the beginning of February 2023, Shapovalov played at the Dallas Open as a wildcard. Seeded third, he lost in the second round to eventual champion Wu Yibing. Seeded third at the Delray Beach Open, he was defeated in the second round by American Michael Mmoh. In Acapulco, he beat Miomir Kecmanović in the first round in three sets. He was eliminated from the tournament in the second round by third seed and 2020 finalist, Taylor Fritz. Seeded 25th in 2023 Indian Wells, he fell in his second round match to Ugo Humbert. Seeded 24th at the Miami Open, he reached the third round, where he lost to ninth seed Taylor Fritz.

Shapovalov started his clay-court season at the 2023 Barcelona Open. Seeded 14th, he lost in the third round to second seed, world No. 5, two-time finalist, and eventual runner-up, Stefanos Tsitsipas. Seeded 21st in 2023 Madrid, he was defeated in the second round by Zhang Zhizhen. Seeded 26th at the 2023 French Open, he beat Brandon Nakashima in the first round in five sets. In the second round, he defeated Matteo Arnaldi in four sets to reach the third round at this Grand Slam for the first time. He lost in the third round to top seed, Carlos Alcaraz, in straight sets.

Starting his grass court season at the 2023 BOSS Open, Shapovalov lost in the first round to qualifier Márton Fucsovics in three sets. Making his debut at the Halle Open, he took out Lloyd Harris in the first round. He was defeated in the second round by ninth seed, world No. 22, and two-time finalist, Alexander Zverev. Shapovalov reached the fourth round of a Major for the first time since the 2022 Australian Open at the 2023 Wimbledon Championships. He was defeated by Roman Safiullin in the fourth round, playing with a knee injury. Shapovalov withdrew from the Paris Masters and put an early end of the 2023 season at the end of October, having withdrawn from the North American hardcourt Summer and the Asian swings and the European indoors tournaments earlier.

At the 2024 Citi DC Open in Washington he reached the quarterfinals as a wildcard with a win over Roberto Bautista Agut, sixth seed Adrian Mannarino and twelfth seed Miomir Kecmanović, and climbed back up more than 30 positions into the top 110. He also received a wildcard for his home Masters, the 2024 National Bank Open in Montreal.

In Shanghai, Shapovalov qualified for the main draw and recorded his 200th career win over Lorenzo Sonego to advance to the second round. As a result, he returned to the top 100 following the tournament's conclusion. He lost to 14th seed Ben Shelton in straight sets for the third time in the season.

Shapovalov won his second ATP Tour title, five years after his first, at the 2024 Belgrade Open, defeating Hamad Medjedovic in the final.

=== 2025: ATP 500 title, back to top 30 ===
Shapovalov started the season at the 2025 ATP Hong Kong Tennis Open, losing to eventual finalist Kei Nishikori in the first round. At the 2025 Adelaide International, he picked up his first win of the season over ninth seed Zhang Zhizhen, before falling to Marcos Giron. At the 2025 Australian Open, he lost to 16th seed Lorenzo Musetti in the second round.

In February, Shapovalov won the 2025 Dallas Open, defeating en route the top three seeds and top-10 players Taylor Fritz, Tommy Paul, and Casper Ruud. It was the biggest title of his career thus far. He became the fourth player (after Dimitrov, del Potro and Kyrgios) with three top-10 wins in ATP 250 or 500 event (since category introductions in 2009). As a result, he returned to the top 35, moving 22 spots up in the singles rankings in February.

At the 2025 Italian Open Shapovalov was upset by qualifier Vilius Gaubas in straight sets in his first match.

In July, Shapovalov reached his second ATP Tour final for the season at the Los Cabos Open, defeating eight seed Adam Walton in the last four. He defeated Aleksandar Kovacevic in the final to lift his fourth title and second of the season, without dropping a set en route, the fourth player to accomplish the feat for the season. As a result, he returned to the top 30 in the singles rankings on July 21, 2025.

== Playing style ==
As a left-handed player with a single-handed backhand, Shapovalov is known for his bold style and high-risk shot making on court, with his leaping backhand considered one of his most memorable shots. Australian tennis coach and former player Darren Cahill drew comparisons between Shapovalov's backhand and that of Stan Wawrinka, specifically noting how both their flexibility and racquet speed were the two main components that drove the power of the shot. His all-around ground game has thus been described as "explosive", with a powerful forehand to complement his backhand. He also often plays serve-and-volley, particularly on quick surfaces, in a bid to catch his opponent off-guard and quickly close points. Commentators have also noted Shapovalov's big serve, and American tennis coach and former player Brad Gilbert found similarities between Shapovalov's serve and that of John McEnroe, noticing that Shapovalov's similar angle and spin on the ball both had comparable trajectories, and that it was his athleticism in launching his body into the serve that helped drive the power instead of simply through his positioning.

However, due to the aggressive overall nature of his style of play, in addition to making many winners, Shapovalov is known to produce a similarly high number of unforced errors in matches. Following his breakthrough, he worked with his coaches to rein in his style when necessary to polish his shotmaking, but he has asserted that playing aggressive is how he enjoys his tennis best and he explained at a press conference in 2021: "When I am playing ugly I do not feel comfortable being on court, that is why winning like that is hard for me. I think that when I am feeling good, when everything flows it is very hard to outplay me."

== Coaching ==
Shapovalov has been coached since he was young by his mother, Tessa Shapovalova. He developed his one-handed backhand at the age of six and his net instincts all under her direction. In early 2017, Martin Laurendeau joined Shapovalov to polish his one-handed backhand motion and help him drive through the shot. In the fall of 2018, Shapovalov added Rob Steckley to his coaching team, replacing Laurendeau, who could no longer travel with them due to a back injury. In April 2019, Steckley confirmed that the two ended their association. That same month, Shapovalov reunited with his junior coach, Adriano Fuorivia, who had coached him to his 2016 Wimbledon boys' singles title. Former world No. 8 Mikhail Youzhny has been added to the coaching team as Shapovalov's new "shot selection" coach in August 2019 at the 2019 Winston-Salem Open. Youzhny helped Shapovalov develop his backhand slice, among other adjustments.

In December 2021, it was reported Jamie Delgado had joined Shapovalov's team after five years of working with Andy Murray. Shapovalov ended his association with Delgado after the Italian Open in 2022, opting to go with frequent Davis Cup teammate Peter Polansky as a full-time coach after Polansky initially joined Shapovalov's coaching team on a temporary basis.

He started a collaboration with Janko Tipsarević in November 2024 which ended in May 2025.

Shapovalov was coached by Mikael Tillström from June 2025 until February 2026.

== Endorsements ==
Since June 2020, Shapovalov has been represented by IMG. Shapovalov is sponsored by Nike for his apparel and footwear and was the face of the company's 2018 US Open collection along with Sloane Stephens. Yonex has provided him with tennis rackets since signing with him in 2017, and he has used the Yonex VCore 95 racket since January 2021. Shapovalov has also been sponsored by BioSteel Sports Nutrition since 2016 and has been a brand ambassador for TAG Heuer since 2017.

== Personal life ==
Shapovalov has been in a relationship with Swedish tennis player Mirjam Björklund since June 26, 2019. They became engaged on July 20, 2023, and married on September 9, 2025. She started coaching him in February 2026 after his split with his coach Tillström.

Shapovalov is fluent in Russian and gave his first interview in Russian to Russian Eurosport commentators in 2018. He holds Canadian citizenship and currently resides in Nassau, Bahamas.

=== Music ===
At the 2019 Indian Wells Masters, Shapovalov debuted a sample of a rap he had quickly written before his third-round match after agreeing to the stadium emcee's request that he perform it for the crowd were he to win. Though he later described the spontaneous performance as "awful", Shapovalov said he was able to gain inspiration from the moment to build on and develop his interests in the genre. In 2020, during the suspension of professional tennis caused by the COVID-19 pandemic, Shapovalov began writing and experimenting with lyrics to record and he constructed his own in-home studio to produce his music. He has credited G-Eazy with inspiring him to develop his interest in writing rap music beginning in 2017, while also naming Drake and Eminem as additional influences, and he attributed them as fundamental to the development of his style, describing it as a mix "between an Eminem aggressive style and the slick, laid-back, raspy voice that G-Eazy has."

In August 2020, Shapovalov debuted his first rap single, "Night Train", under the name "Shapo." The track honors the life he had lived as an athlete thus far, from developing during his childhood and overcoming those who had doubted him, to becoming a professional, which includes engaging with sponsors and contending with online critics, among other experiences. The following month, Shapovalov released his second single, "Drip", a French-English track that features French tennis player Corentin Moutet and shares the same themes as his debut track of the continuing work that goes into making his tennis dreams come true.

== Career statistics ==
=== Grand Slam tournament performance timelines ===
Key
W	F	SF	QF	#R	RR	Q#	DNQ	A	NH

(W) winner; (F) finalist; (SF) semifinalist; (QF) quarterfinalist; (#R) rounds 4, 3, 2, 1; (RR) round-robin stage; (Q#) qualification round; (DNQ) did not qualify; (A) absent; (NH) not held; (SR) strike rate (events won / competed); (W–L) win–loss record.
To avoid confusion and double counting, these charts are updated at the conclusion of a tournament or when the player's participation has ended.

==== Singles ====
Current through the 2026 US Open.

Tournament	2017	2018	2019	2020	2021	2022	2023	2024	2025	2026	SR	W–L	Win %
Australian Open	A	2R	3R	1R	3R	QF	3R	1R	2R	2R	0 / 9	13–9	59%
French Open	Q1	2R	1R	2R	A	1R	3R	3R	2R	1R	0 / 8	7–8	47%
Wimbledon	1R	2R	1R	NH	SF	2R	4R	3R	1R	1R	0 / 9	11–9	55%
US Open	4R	3R	3R	QF	3R	3R	A	1R	3R	3R	0 / 8	19–9	68%
Win–loss	3–2	5–4	4–4	5–3	8–3	7–4	7–3	4–4	4–4	3–4	0 / 34	50–35	59%

==== Doubles ====
Tournament	2019	2020	2021	2022	2023	2024	2025	2026	SR	W–L	Win %
Australian Open	A	A	2R	A	A	A	A	A	0 / 1	1–1	50%
French Open	A	1R	A	A	A	A	A	A	0 / 1	0–1	0%
Wimbledon	A	NH	A	A	A	A	A		0 / 0	0–0	–
US Open	3R	QF	A	A	A	1R	A		0 / 3	3–3	50%
Win–loss	1–1	2–2	1–1	0–0	0–0	0–1	0–0	0–0	0 / 5	4–5	44%

=== ATP 1000 tournaments ===
==== Singles: 1 (1 runner-up) ====
Result	Year	Tournament	Surface	Opponent	Score
Loss	2019	Paris Masters, France	Hard (i)	(Serbia) Novak Djokovic	3–6, 4–6

== Awards ==
- 2017 – ATP Star of Tomorrow
- 2017 – ATP Most Improved Player
- 2017 – Tennis Canada Male Player of the Year
- 2017 – Lionel Conacher Award

== Notes ==
Awards
Preceded by (United States) Taylor Fritz	ATP Star of Tomorrow; 2017	Succeeded by (Australia) Alex de Minaur (Newcomer of the Year)
Preceded by (France) Lucas Pouille	ATP Most Improved Player; 2017	Succeeded by (Greece) Stefanos Tsitsipas
