= 2014 Challenger Banque Nationale de Rimouski =

- Date: March 17–23
- Edition: 8th
- Category: ATP Challenger Tour
- Prize money: US$40,000+H
- Surface: Hard (indoor)
- Location: Rimouski, Canada
- Venue: Tennis de Rimouski

Champions

Singles
- (Australia) Sam Groth

Doubles
- (United Kingdom) Edward Corrie / (United Kingdom) Daniel Smethurst
← 2013 ·	Challenger de Rimouski	· 2015 →

The 2014 Challenger Banque Nationale de Rimouski was a professional tennis tournament played on indoor hard courts. It was the 8th edition of the tournament and part of the 2014 ATP Challenger Tour, offering a total of $40,000 in prize money. It took place in Rimouski, Canada between March 17 and March 23, 2014.

== Singles main-draw entrants ==
=== Seeds ===
Country	Player	Rank^{1}	Seed
USA	Rajeev Ram	141	1
JPN	Yūichi Sugita	145	2
JPN	Hiroki Moriya	167	3
AUS	Sam Groth	176	4
USA	Bobby Reynolds	182	5
GER	Andreas Beck	188	6
FRA	Vincent Millot	199	7
BEL	Niels Desein	213	8

- ^{1} Rankings are as of March 10, 2014

=== Other entrants ===
The following players received wildcards into the singles main draw:

- (Canada) Hugo Di Feo
- (United Kingdom) Richard Gabb
- (Canada) Isade Juneau
- (Canada) Pavel Krainik

The following players entered the singles main draw with a protected ranking:

- (Ecuador) Giovanni Lapentti
- (South Africa) Izak van der Merwe

The following players received entry from the qualifying draw:

- (United States) Kevin King
- (United States) Nikita Kryvonos
- (Switzerland) Adrien Bossel
- (United States) Dennis Nevolo

== Champions ==
=== Singles ===
- (Australia) Sam Groth def. (Croatia) Ante Pavić, 7–6^{(7–3)}, 6–2

=== Doubles ===
- (United Kingdom) Edward Corrie / (United Kingdom) Daniel Smethurst def. (Belgium) Germain Gigounon / (Belgium) Olivier Rochus, 6–2, 6–1
