= 2014 Challenger Banque Nationale de Rimouski – Singles =

Singles
- 2014 Challenger Banque Nationale de Rimouski

Final
- Champion: (Australia) Sam Groth
- Runner-up: (Croatia) Ante Pavić
- Score: 7–6^{(7–3)}, 6–2

Events
| Singles | Doubles |
| ← 2013 · | Challenger de Rimouski | · 2015 → |

Rik de Voest was the defending champion but decided not to compete.

Sam Groth won the title, defeating Ante Pavić in the final, 7–6^{(7–3)}, 6–2.

== Seeds ==
1. (United States) Rajeev Ram (quarterfinals)
2. (Japan) Yūichi Sugita (semifinals)
3. (Japan) Hiroki Moriya (second round)
4. (Australia) Sam Groth (champion)
5. (United States) Bobby Reynolds (first round)
6. (Germany) Andreas Beck (quarterfinals)
7. (France) Vincent Millot (second round)
8. (Belgium) Niels Desein (second round)

== Draw ==
=== Key ===
- Q = Qualifier
- WC = Wild card
- LL = Lucky loser
- Alt = Alternate
- SE = Special exempt
- PR = Protected ranking
- ITF = ITF entry
- JE = Junior exempt
- w/o = Walkover
- r = Retired
- d = Defaulted
- SR = Special ranking

=== Finals ===
Semifinals
(United States) Austin Krajicek | 2 | 3
4 | (Australia) Sam Groth | 6 | 6
(Croatia) Ante Pavić | 6 | 6
2 | (Japan) Yūichi Sugita | 3 | 4

Final
4 | (Australia) Sam Groth | 7^{7} | 6
(Croatia) Ante Pavić | 6^{3} | 2

=== Top half ===
First round
1 | (United States) R Ram | 6 | 6
(Belgium) O Rochus | 3 | 4
(United States) C Buchanan | 7^{7} | 5 | 7
PR | (Ecuador) G Lapentti | 6^{3} | 7 | 5
Q | (United States) K King | 4 | 6 | 6^{11}
(United States) A Krajicek | 6 | 4 | 7^{13}
(Colombia) JC Spir | 5 | 1^{r}
8 | (Belgium) N Desein | 7 | 4
4 | (Australia) S Groth | 6 | 6
WC | (Canada) Hugo Di Feo | 1 | 4
Q | (United States) N Kryvonos | 6^{3} | 7^{10} | 4
(Slovakia) Adrian Sikora | 7^{7} | 6^{8} | 6
WC | (Canada) Pavel Krainik | 6^{4} | 3
(Belgium) G Gigounon | 7^{7} | 6
(United Kingdom) E Corrie | 4 | 3
6 | (Germany) A Beck | 6 | 6

Second round
1 | (United States) R Ram | 6 | 6
(United States) C Buchanan | 3 | 3
(United States) A Krajicek | 6 | 4 | 7
8 | (Belgium) N Desein | 4 | 6 | 5
4 | (Australia) S Groth | 6 | 7^{7}
(Slovakia) A Sikora | 2 | 6^{1}
(Belgium) G Gigounon | 2 | 1
6 | (Germany) A Beck | 6 | 6

Quarterfinals
1 | (United States) R Ram | 6^{7} | 6^{4}
(United States) A Krajicek | 7^{9} | 7^{7}
4 | (Australia) S Groth | 1 | 6 | 7^{10}
6 | (Germany) A Beck | 6 | 3 | 6^{8}

Semifinals
(United States) A Krajicek | 2 | 3
4 | (Australia) S Groth | 6 | 6

=== Bottom half ===
First round
5 | (United States) B Reynolds | 3 | 3
(Croatia) A Pavić | 6 | 6
Q | (Switzerland) A Bossel | 2 | 6^{4}
(Poland) Piotr Gadomski | 6 | 7^{7}
WC | (Canada) Isade Juneau | 2 | 4
(Japan) Y Nishioka | 6 | 6
(Canada) F Peliwo | 3 | 6 | 3
3 | (Japan) H Moriya | 6 | 4 | 6
7 | (France) V Millot | 3 | 6 | 6
Q | (United States) Dennis Nevolo | 6 | 2 | 2
(United Kingdom) D Cox | 6 | 6
PR | (South Africa) Ivd Merwe | 3 | 1
WC | (United Kingdom) Richard Gabb | 4 | 2
(United Kingdom) D Smethurst | 6 | 6
(United States) R Ginepri | 4 | 2
2 | (Japan) Y Sugita | 6 | 6

Second round
(Croatia) A Pavić | 6 | 6
(Poland) P Gadomski | 2 | 3
(Japan) Y Nishioka | 6 | 0 | 6
3 | (Japan) H Moriya | 1 | 6 | 3
7 | (France) V Millot | 7^{7} | 1 | 4
(United Kingdom) D Cox | 6^{2} | 6 | 6
(United Kingdom) D Smethurst | 7 | 1 | 3
2 | (Japan) Y Sugita | 5 | 6 | 6

Quarterfinals
(Croatia) A Pavić | 7 | 2 | 6
(Japan) Y Nishioka | 5 | 6 | 3
(United Kingdom) D Cox | 6^{5} | 1
2 | (Japan) Y Sugita | 7^{7} | 6

Semifinals
(Croatia) A Pavić | 6 | 6
2 | (Japan) Y Sugita | 3 | 4
