= 2014 Challenger Banque Nationale de Rimouski – Doubles =

Doubles
- 2014 Challenger Banque Nationale de Rimouski

Final
- Champion: (United Kingdom) Edward Corrie (United Kingdom) Daniel Smethurst
- Runner-up: (Belgium) Germain Gigounon (Belgium) Olivier Rochus
- Score: 6–2, 6–1

Events
Singles	Doubles
← 2013 ·	Challenger de Rimouski	· 2015 →

Sam Groth and John-Patrick Smith were the defending champion, but they did not play together. Sam Groth played alongside Chris Guccione and lost in the quarterfinals to Ehward Corrie and Daniel Smethurst. John-Patrick Smith decided not to compete this tournament.

Edward Corrie and Daniel Smethurst won the title, defeating Germain Gigounon and Olivier Rochus in the final, 6–2, 6–1.

== Seeds ==
1. (Australia) Sam Groth / (Australia) Chris Guccione (quarterfinals)
2. (Australia) Paul Hanley / (Canada) Adil Shamasdin (semifinals)
3. (United States) James Cerretani / (Sweden) Andreas Siljeström (semifinals)
4. (Croatia) Ante Pavić / (Croatia) Franko Škugor (first round)

== Draw ==
=== Key ===
- Q = Qualifier
- WC = Wild card
- LL = Lucky loser
- Alt = Alternate
- SE = Special exempt
- PR = Protected ranking
- ITF = ITF entry
- JE = Junior exempt
- w/o = Walkover
- r = Retired
- d = Defaulted
- SR = Special ranking

=== Draw ===
First round
1	(Australia) S Groth (Australia) C Guccione	6^{5}	7^{7}	[10]
(Poland) Piotr Gadomski (Canada) F Peliwo	7^{7}	6^{4}	[5]
(Japan) H Moriya (Japan) Y Sugita	6	1	[2]
(United Kingdom) E Corrie (United Kingdom) D Smethurst	0	6	[10]
3	(United States) J Cerretani (Sweden) A Siljeström	6	7
WC	(Canada) Pavel Krainik (South Africa) F Wolmarans	2	5
WC	(Canada) Hugo Di Feo (Canada) Isade Juneau	7	0	[7]
PR	(Australia) J Kerr (South Africa) Ivd Merwe	5	6	[10]
(United States) C Buchanan (United States) A Krajicek	4	6	[3]
(Belgium) G Gigounon (Belgium) O Rochus	6	4	[10]
(United States) K King (Colombia) JC Spir	7^{7}	7^{7}
4	(Croatia) A Pavić (Croatia) F Škugor	6^{3}	6^{4}
(United Kingdom) D Cox (Slovakia) Adrian Sikora	3	5
(United States) R Ram (United States) B Reynolds	6	7
(Germany) A Beck (Republic of Ireland) J Cluskey	6^{3}	4
2	(Australia) P Hanley (Canada) A Shamasdin	7^{7}	6

Quarterfinals
1	(Australia) S Groth (Australia) C Guccione	7	6^{2}	[5]
(United Kingdom) E Corrie (United Kingdom) D Smethurst	5	7^{7}	[10]
3	(United States) J Cerretani (Sweden) A Siljeström	6	5	[10]
PR	(Australia) J Kerr (South Africa) Ivd Merwe	4	7	[5]
(Belgium) G Gigounon (Belgium) O Rochus	0	6	[10]
(United States) K King (Colombia) JC Spir	6	4	[7]
(United States) R Ram (United States) B Reynolds	6^{3}	7	[8]
2	(Australia) P Hanley (Canada) A Shamasdin	7^{7}	5	[10]

Semifinals
(United Kingdom) E Corrie (United Kingdom) D Smethurst	6	7^{7}
3	(United States) J Cerretani (Sweden) A Siljeström	4	6^{4}
(Belgium) G Gigounon (Belgium) O Rochus	6	6
2	(Australia) P Hanley (Canada) A Shamasdin	4	2

Final
(United Kingdom) E Corrie (United Kingdom) D Smethurst	6	6
(Belgium) G Gigounon (Belgium) O Rochus	2	1
