= 2013 Challenger Banque Nationale de Rimouski =

- Date: March 18 – March 24
- Edition: 7th
- Category: ATP Challenger Tour
- Prize money: US$35,000+H
- Surface: Hard (indoor)
- Location: Rimouski, Canada
- Venue: Tennis de Rimouski

Champions

Singles
- (South Africa) Rik de Voest

Doubles
- (Australia) Sam Groth / (Australia) John-Patrick Smith
← 2012 ·	Challenger de Rimouski	· 2014 →

The 2013 Challenger Banque Nationale de Rimouski was a professional tennis tournament played on indoor hard courts. It was the 7th edition of the tournament and part of the 2013 ATP Challenger Tour, offering a total of $35,000 in prize money. It took place in Rimouski, Canada between March 18 and March 24, 2013.

== Singles main-draw entrants ==
=== Seeds ===
Country	Player	Rank^{1}	Seed
CAN	Vasek Pospisil	128	1
TUN	Malek Jaziri	129	2
JPN	Yūichi Sugita	138	3
AUS	John Millman	161	4
USA	Bobby Reynolds	166	5
GER	Cedrik-Marcel Stebe	167	6
POL	Michał Przysiężny	176	7
TPE	Jimmy Wang	178	8

- ^{1} Rankings are as of March 11, 2013

=== Other entrants ===
The following players received wildcards into the singles main draw:

- (Canada) Hugo Di Feo
- (Canada) Filip Peliwo
- (Canada) Milan Pokrajac
- (Canada) Brayden Schnur

The following players received entry from the qualifying draw:

- (Belgium) Maxime Authom
- (South Africa) Rik de Voest
- (United States) Adam El-Mihdawy
- (Japan) Hiroki Moriya

== Champions ==
=== Singles ===
- (South Africa) Rik de Voest def. (Canada) Vasek Pospisil, 7–6^{(8–6)}, 6–4

=== Doubles ===
- (Australia) Sam Groth / (Australia) John-Patrick Smith def. (Germany) Philipp Marx / (Romania) Florin Mergea, 7–6^{(7–5)}, 7–6^{(9–7)}
