= 2015 Challenger Banque Nationale de Drummondville =

- Date: March 16 – March 22
- Edition: 9th
- Category: ATP Challenger Tour
- Prize money: US$50,000+H
- Surface: Hard (indoor)
- Location: Drummondville, Canada
- Venue: Tennis intérieur René-Verrier

Champions

Singles
- (Australia) John-Patrick Smith

Doubles
- (Canada) Philip Bester / (Australia) Chris Guccione
- Challenger de Drummondville

The 2015 Challenger Banque Nationale de Drummondville was a professional tennis tournament played on indoor hard courts. It was the 9th edition of the tournament, the 1st in its current location, and part of the 2015 ATP Challenger Tour, offering a total of $50,000 in prize money. It took place in Drummondville, Canada between March 16 and March 22, 2015.

== Singles main draw entrants ==
=== Seeds ===
Country	Player	Rank^{1}	Seed
SVK	Lukáš Lacko	95	1
GER	Andreas Beck	113	2
ITA	Luca Vanni	114	3
SVK	Norbert Gombos	117	4
COL	Alejandro Falla	119	5
BEL	Ruben Bemelmans	133	6
CAN	Frank Dancevic	166	7
BEL	Maxime Authom	172	8

- ^{1} Rankings are as of March 9, 2015

=== Other entrants ===
The following players received wildcards into the singles main draw:

- (Canada) Philip Bester
- (Canada) Pavel Krainik
- (Canada) Filip Peliwo
- (Canada) David Volfson

The following player entered the singles main draw with a protected ranking:

- (United States) Tennys Sandgren

The following players received entry as alternates:

- (Ecuador) Gonzalo Escobar
- (Belgium) Germain Gigounon
- (United States) Jason Jung
- (Bulgaria) Dimitar Kutrovsky
- (Czech Republic) Marek Michalička
- (Colombia) Eduardo Struvay

The following players received entry from the qualifying draw:

- (Canada) Félix Auger-Aliassime (withdrew, abdominal strain)
- (Italy) Matteo Donati
- (United States) Adam El Mihdawy
- (United States) Kevin King

The following player received entry as a lucky loser:

- (South Africa) Fritz Wolmarans

== Champions ==
=== Singles ===
- (Australia) John-Patrick Smith def. (Canada) Frank Dancevic, 6–7^{(11–13)}, 7–6^{(7–3)}, 7–5

=== Doubles ===
- (Canada) Philip Bester / (Australia) Chris Guccione def. (Canada) Frank Dancevic / (Germany) Frank Moser, 6–4, 7–6^{(8–6)}
