= 2014 Visit Panamá Cup de Chitré – Singles =

Singles
- 2014 Visit Panamá Cup de Chitré

Final
- Champion: (United States) Wayne Odesnik
- Runner-up: (Chinese Taipei) Jimmy Wang
- Score: 5–7, 6–4, 6–4

Events
Singles	Doubles
Visit Panamá Cup de Chitré

This was the first edition of the event and was won by Wayne Odesnik.

== Seeds ==
1. (Colombia) Alejandro Falla (quarterfinals, withdrew)
2. (Italy) Paolo Lorenzi (semifinals)
3. (United States) Wayne Odesnik (champion)
4. (Tunisia) Malek Jaziri (quarterfinals)
5. (Chinese Taipei) Jimmy Wang (final)
6. (Austria) Gerald Melzer (quarterfinals)
7. (Brazil) André Ghem (quarterfinals)
8. (Japan) Taro Daniel (second round)

== Draw ==
=== Key ===
- Q = Qualifier
- WC = Wild card
- LL = Lucky loser
- Alt = Alternate
- SE = Special exempt
- PR = Protected ranking
- ITF = ITF entry
- JE = Junior exempt
- w/o = Walkover
- r = Retired
- d = Defaulted
- SR = Special ranking

=== Finals ===
Semifinals
5	(Chinese Taipei) Jimmy Wang	7^{7}	7
PR	(United States) Daniel Kosakowski	6^{4}	5
3	(United States) Wayne Odesnik	7	6
2	(Italy) Paolo Lorenzi	5	2

Final
5	(Chinese Taipei) Jimmy Wang	7	4	4
3	(United States) Wayne Odesnik	5	6	6

=== Top half ===
First round
1	(Colombia) A Falla	6	6
(Brazil) F Romboli	4	0
(Zimbabwe) T Garanganga	4	3
Q	(Brazil) H Cunha	6	6
(Colombia) C Salamanca	6	6
WC	(Panama) Luis Fernando García	1	2
Q	(United States) D Novikov	6	3	6^{2}
5	(Chinese Taipei) J Wang	2	6	7^{7}
4/WC	(Tunisia) M Jaziri	6	6
(Spain) J Lizariturry	2	0
(Colombia) N Barrientos	4
(Brazil) T Turini	1^{r}
PR	(United States) D Kosakowski	7^{7}	4	6
(United States) N Meister	6^{5}	6	2
Q	(Brazil) M Demoliner	3	4
6	(Austria) G Melzer	6	6

Second round
1	(Colombia) A Falla	6	4	6
Q	(Brazil) H Cunha	3	6	3
(Colombia) C Salamanca	5	4
5	(Chinese Taipei) J Wang	7	6
4/WC	(Tunisia) M Jaziri	6	6
(Colombia) N Barrientos	1	3
PR	(United States) D Kosakowski	4	7^{7}	7^{7}
6	(Austria) G Melzer	6	6^{3}	6^{0}

Quarterfinals
1	(Colombia) A Falla
5	(Chinese Taipei) J Wang	w/o
4/WC	(Tunisia) M Jaziri	6^{4}	6^{5}
PR	(United States) D Kosakowski	7^{7}	7^{7}

Semifinals
5	(Chinese Taipei) J Wang	7^{7}	7
PR	(United States) D Kosakowski	6^{4}	5

=== Bottom half ===
First round
8	(Japan) T Daniel	6	6
(Colombia) M Quintero	2	2
(Colombia) E Struvay	6	7^{7}
(Ecuador) I Endara	2	6^{2}
(Colombia) JC Spir	4	1
(Italy) W Trusendi	6	6
(Italy) R Ghedin	6^{2}	6^{5}
3	(United States) W Odesnik	7^{7}	7^{7}
7	(Brazil) A Ghem	6	6
WC	(Panama) Dylan Centella	1	0
Q	(United States) J Donaldson	1	4
(United States) C Buchanan	6	6
(Argentina) JI Londero	6	6
WC	(Panama) José Carlos Peralta	0	0
(Brazil) Wilson Leite	1	2
2	(Italy) P Lorenzi	6	6

Second round
8	(Japan) T Daniel	6^{1}	6	1
(Colombia) E Struvay	7^{7}	2	6
(Italy) W Trusendi	6^{7}	4
3	(United States) W Odesnik	7^{9}	6
7	(Brazil) A Ghem	7^{8}	6^{7}	7^{7}
(United States) C Buchanan	6^{6}	7^{9}	6^{5}
(Argentina) JI Londero	5	2
2	(Italy) P Lorenzi	7	6

Quarterfinals
(Colombia) E Struvay	5	4
3	(United States) W Odesnik	7	6
7	(Brazil) A Ghem	2	1
2	(Italy) P Lorenzi	6	6

Semifinals
3	(United States) W Odesnik	7	6
2	(Italy) P Lorenzi	5	2
