= 2012 Challenger Banque Nationale de Rimouski =

- Date: March 19 – March 25
- Edition: 6th
- Category: ATP Challenger Tour
- Prize money: US$35,000+H
- Surface: Hard (indoor)
- Location: Rimouski, Canada
- Venue: Tennis de Rimouski

Champions

Singles
- (Canada) Vasek Pospisil

Doubles
- (Poland) Tomasz Bednarek / (France) Olivier Charroin
← 2011 ·	Challenger de Rimouski	· 2013 →

The 2012 Challenger Banque Nationale de Rimouski was a professional tennis tournament played on indoor hard courts. It was the 6th edition of the tournament and part of the 2012 ATP Challenger Tour, offering a total of $35,000 in prize money. It took place in Rimouski, Canada between March 19 and March 25, 2012.

== Singles main-draw entrants ==
=== Seeds ===
Country	Player	Rank^{1}	Seed
JPN	Tatsuma Ito	105	1
CAN	Vasek Pospisil	114	2
RSA	Izak van der Merwe	132	3
GER	Dominik Meffert	204	4
GER	Denis Gremelmayr	207	5
BEL	Maxime Authom	212	6
GER	Peter Gojowczyk	215	7
SUI	Stéphane Bohli	221	8

- ^{1} Rankings are as of March 12, 2012

=== Other entrants ===
The following players received wildcards into the singles main draw:

- (Canada) Philip Bester
- (Canada) Samuel Monette
- (Canada) Filip Peliwo
- (Canada) Milan Pokrajac

The following players received entry from the qualifying draw:

- (United States) Devin Britton
- (United States) Austin Krajicek
- (Barbados) Haydn Lewis
- (France) Clément Reix

== Champions ==
=== Singles ===
- (Canada) Vasek Pospisil def. (Belgium) Maxime Authom, 7–6^{(8–6)}, 6–4

=== Doubles ===
- (Poland) Tomasz Bednarek / (France) Olivier Charroin def. (Germany) Jaan-Frederik Brunken / (Germany) Stefan Seifert, 6–3, 6–2
