= 2013 Challenger Banque Nationale de Rimouski – Doubles =

Doubles
- 2013 Challenger Banque Nationale de Rimouski

Final
- Champions: (Australia) Sam Groth (Australia) John-Patrick Smith
- Runners-up: (Germany) Philipp Marx (Romania) Florin Mergea
- Score: 7–6^{(7–5)}, 7–6^{(9–7)}

Events
| Singles | Doubles |
| ← 2012 · | Challenger de Rimouski | · 2014 → |

Tomasz Bednarek and Olivier Charroin were the defending champions but decided not to participate.
Sam Groth and John-Patrick Smith defeated Philipp Marx and Florin Mergea 7–6^{(7–5)}, 7–6^{(9–7)} in the final to win the title.

== Seeds ==
1. (United States) James Cerretani / (Canada) Adil Shamasdin (quarterfinals)
2. (Germany) Philipp Marx / (Romania) Florin Mergea (final)
3. (Australia) Sam Groth / (Australia) John-Patrick Smith (champions)
4. (South Africa) Rik de Voest / (South Africa) Izak van der Merwe (withdrawn)

== Draw ==
=== Key ===
- Q = Qualifier
- WC = Wild card
- LL = Lucky loser
- Alt = Alternate
- SE = Special exempt
- PR = Protected ranking
- ITF = ITF entry
- JE = Junior exempt
- w/o = Walkover
- r = Retired
- d = Defaulted
- SR = Special ranking

=== Draw ===
First round
1 | (United States) J Cerretani (Canada) A Shamasdin | 6 | 6
WC | (Canada) Hugo Di Feo (Canada) B Schnur | 3 | 3
(United States) C Buchanan (Japan) H Moriya | 1 | 3
(Canada) V Pospisil (United States) B Reynolds | 6 | 6
3 | (Australia) S Groth (Australia) J-P Smith | 7 | 2 | [10]
(Canada) É Chvojka (United States) V Mirzadeh | 5 | 6 | [6]
Alt | (New Zealand) D King-Turner (Australia) J Millman | 6 | 5 | [7]
WC | (Canada) F Peliwo (Canada) Milan Pokrajac | 3 | 7 | [10]
(Chinese Taipei) J Wang (United States) D Zivkovic | 6 | 6
(Republic of Ireland) J McGee (Poland) M Przysiężny | 4 | 4
(Mexico) D Garza (Tunisia) M Jaziri | w/o
4 | (South Africa) R de Voest (South Africa) I van der Merwe
WC | (Canada) Daniel Chu (Canada) Pavel Krainik | 7^{7} | 3
(Belgium) M Authom (France) V Millor | 6^{2} | 0^{r}
(United States) D Britton (United States) A Krajicek | 4 | 5
2 | (Germany) P Marx (Romania) F Mergea | 6 | 7

Quarterfinals
1 | (United States) J Cerretani (Canada) A Shamasdin | 3 | 2
(Canada) V Pospisil (United States) B Reynolds | 6 | 6
3 | (Australia) S Groth (Australia) J-P Smith | 6 | 6
WC | (Canada) F Peliwo (Canada) M Pokrajac | 1 | 4
(Chinese Taipei) J Wang (United States) D Zivkovic | 7^{8} | 6
(Mexico) D Garza (Tunisia) M Jaziri | 6^{6} | 4
WC | (Canada) D Chu (Canada) P Krainik | 1 | 3
2 | (Germany) P Marx (Romania) F Mergea | 6 | 6

Semifinals
(Canada) V Pospisil (United States) B Reynolds | 7^{7} | 6^{3} | [5]
3 | (Australia) S Groth (Australia) J-P Smith | 6^{3} | 7^{7} | [10]
(Chinese Taipei) J Wang (United States) D Zivkovic | 3 | 4
2 | (Germany) P Marx (Romania) F Mergea | 6 | 6

Final
3 | (Australia) S Groth (Australia) J-P Smith | 7^{7} | 7^{9}
2 | (Germany) P Marx (Romania) F Mergea | 6^{5} | 6^{7}
