= 2014 Visit Panamá Cup de Chitré =

- Date: 27 January–2 February
- Edition: 1st
- Category: ATP Challenger Tour (men)
- Prize money: $40,000+H
- Surface: Hard
- Location: Chitré, Panama

Champions

Singles
- (United States) Wayne Odesnik

Doubles
- (United States) Kevin King / (Colombia) Juan-Carlos Spir
- Visit Panamá Cup de Chitré

The 2014 Visit Panamá Cup de Chitré was a professional tennis tournament played on outdoor hard courts. It was the first edition of the tournament for the men. It was part of the 2014 ATP Challenger Tour. It took place in Chitré, Panama, on 27 January to 2 February 2014.

== Singles main draw entrants ==
=== Seeds ===
Country	Player	Rank^{1}	Seed
COL	Alejandro Falla	87	1
ITA	Paolo Lorenzi	115	2
USA	Wayne Odesnik	139	3
TUN	Malek Jaziri	168	4
TPE	Jimmy Wang	173	5
AUT	Gerald Melzer	201	6
BRA	André Ghem	225	7
JPN	Taro Daniel	238	8

- ^{1} Rankings as of 13 January 2014

=== Other entrants ===
The following players received wildcards into the singles main draw:

- (Panama) Luis Fernando García
- (Panama) Dylan Centella
- (Panama) José Carlos Peralta
- (Tunisia) Malek Jaziri

The following players used Protected Ranking to gain entry into the singles main draw:

- (United States) Daniel Kosakowski

The following players received entry from the qualifying draw:

- (United States) Dennis Novikov
- (Brazil) Henrique Cunha
- (Brazil) Marcelo Demoliner
- (United States) Jared Donaldson

== Champions ==
=== Singles ===
- (United States) Wayne Odesnik def. (Chinese Taipei) Jimmy Wang, 5–7, 6–4, 6–4

=== Doubles ===
- (United States) Kevin King / (Colombia) Juan-Carlos Spir def. (Puerto Rico) Alex Llompart / (Argentina) Mateo Nicolás Martínez, 7–6^{(7–5)}, 6–4
