= 2014 Visit Panamá Cup de Chitré – Doubles =

Doubles
- 2014 Visit Panamá Cup de Chitré

Final
- Champions: (United States) Kevin King (Colombia) Juan-Carlos Spir
- Runners-up: (Puerto Rico) Alex Llompart (Argentina) Mateo Nicolas Martinez
- Score: 7–6^{(7–5)}, 6–4

Events
Singles	Doubles
- Visit Panamá Cup de Chitré

This was the first edition of the event and was won by Kevin King and Juan-Carlos Spir.

== Seeds ==
1. (Brazil) Marcelo Demoliner / (Croatia) Franko Škugor (first round)
2. (Colombia) Nicolás Barrientos / (Colombia) Eduardo Struvay (quarterfinals)
3. (Italy) Riccardo Ghedin / (Italy) Alessandro Motti (semifinals)
4. (United States) James Cerretani / (Colombia) Carlos Salamanca (first round)

== Draw ==
Key

- Q = Qualifier
- WC = Wild card
- LL = Lucky loser
- Alt = Alternate
- ITF = ITF entry
- PR = Protected ranking
- SR = Special ranking
- SE = Special exempt
- JE = Junior exempt
- JR = Junior Accelerator Programme entrant
- CO = College Accelerator Programme entrant
- NG = Next Gen Accelerator Program entrant
- w/o = Walkover
- r = Retired
- d = Defaulted

First round
1	(Brazil) M Demoliner (Croatia) F Škugor	6^{4}	4
(Puerto Rico) A Llompart (Argentina) MN Martínez	7^{7}	6
(Colombia) M Quintero (Brazil) T Turini	1	1
WC	(Italy) E Becuzzi (Italy) P Lorenzi	6	6
4	(United States) J Cerretani (Colombia) C Salamanca	4	3
(Argentina) JI Londero (Brazil) F Romboli	6	6
WC	(Panama) LF García (Panama) JG Gómez	6	7^{7}
(United States) D Kosakowski (United States) N Meister	3	6^{2}
(Ecuador) I Endara (Brazil) W Leite	4	6	[1]
(United States) C Buchanan (United States) V Mirzadeh	6	4	[10]
(Brazil) A Ghem (Spain) J Lizariturry	2	3
3	(Italy) R Ghedin (Italy) A Motti	6	6
(Tunisia) M Jaziri (United States) D Novikov	2^{r}
(United States) K King (Colombia) J-C Spir	5
WC	(Colombia) F Escobar (Ecuador) S Rivera	4	6	[5]
2	(Colombia) N Barrientos (Colombia) E Struvay	6	3	[10]

Quarterfinals
(Puerto Rico) A Llompart (Argentina) MN Martínez	6	6
WC	(Italy) E Becuzzi (Italy) P Lorenzi	4	1
(Argentina) JI Londero (Brazil) F Romboli	6	6
WC	(Panama) LF García (Panama) JG Gómez	2	2
(United States) C Buchanan (United States) V Mirzadeh	3	5
3	(Italy) R Ghedin (Italy) A Motti	6	7
(United States) K King (Colombia) J-C Spir	6	6
2	(Colombia) N Barrientos (Colombia) E Struvay	4	1

Semifinals
(Puerto Rico) A Llompart (Argentina) MN Martínez	6	6^{7}	[10]
(Argentina) JI Londero (Brazil) F Romboli	3	7^{9}	[7]
3	(Italy) R Ghedin (Italy) A Motti	6^{3}	7	[5]
(United States) K King (Colombia) J-C Spir	7^{7}	5	[10]

Final
(Puerto Rico) A Llompart (Argentina) MN Martínez	6^{5}	4
(United States) K King (Colombia) J-C Spir	7^{7}	6
