= 2012 Challenger Banque Nationale de Rimouski – Doubles =

Doubles
- 2012 Challenger Banque Nationale de Rimouski

Final
- Champions: (Poland) Tomasz Bednarek (France) Olivier Charroin
- Runners-up: (Germany) Jaan-Frederik Brunken (Germany) Stefan Seifert
- Score: 6–3, 6–2

Events
Singles	Doubles
← 2011 ·	Challenger de Rimouski	· 2013 →

Treat Conrad Huey and Vasek Pospisil were the defending champions but Huey decided not to participate.
Pospisil played alongside Adil Shamasdin, reaching the quarterfinals.
Tomasz Bednarek and Olivier Charroin won the title, defeating Jaan-Frederik Brunken and Stefan Seifert 6–3, 6–2 in the final.

== Seeds ==
1. (Germany) Martin Emmrich / (Sweden) Andreas Siljeström (semifinals)
2. (Canada) Vasek Pospisil / (Canada) Adil Shamasdin (quarterfinals)
3. (Poland) Tomasz Bednarek / (France) Olivier Charroin (champions)
4. (Australia) Colin Ebelthite / (Australia) John-Patrick Smith (withdrew)

== Draw ==
=== Key ===
- Q = Qualifier
- WC = Wild card
- LL = Lucky loser
- Alt = Alternate
- SE = Special exempt
- PR = Protected ranking
- ITF = ITF entry
- JE = Junior exempt
- w/o = Walkover
- r = Retired
- d = Defaulted
- SR = Special ranking

=== Draw ===
First round
1	(Germany) M Emmrich (Sweden) A Siljeström	6	6
(Canada) É Chvojka (Canada) P Polansky	3	4
(France) V Millot (France) M Rodrigues	6^{5}	3
(Belgium) M Authom (Belgium) Alexandre Folie	7^{7}	6
3	(Poland) T Bednarek (France) O Charroin	4	6	[10]
(France) P-H Herbert (Poland) G Panfil	6	3	[4]
(Switzerland) S Bohli (Switzerland) M Lammer	4	5
(United States) D Britton (United States) A Krajicek	6	7
(Italy) T Fabbiano (Romania) F Mergea	3	6	[10]
WC	(Canada) F Peliwo (Canada) Milan Pokrajac	6	3	[7]
(United States) M Sykut (United States) D Zivkovic	1	1
4	(Australia) C Ebelthite (Australia) J-P Smith	6	6
Alt	(Germany) Jaan-Frederik Brunken (Germany) Stefan Seifert	1	7^{7}	[10]
WC	(Canada) P Bester (Canada) Kamil Pajkowski	6	6^{5}	[8]
WC	(Canada) Pavel Krainik (Canada) Edward Nguyen	2	1
2	(Canada) V Pospisil (Canada) A Shamasdin	6	6

Quarterfinals
1	(Germany) M Emmrich (Sweden) A Siljeström	6	6
(Belgium) M Authom (Belgium) Alexandre Folie	3	4
3	(Poland) T Bednarek (France) O Charroin	w/o
(United States) D Britton (United States) A Krajicek
(Italy) T Fabbiano (Romania) F Mergea	w/o
4	(Australia) C Ebelthite (Australia) J-P Smith
Alt	(Germany) Jaan-Frederik Brunken (Germany) Stefan Seifert	3	6	[10]
2	(Canada) V Pospisil (Canada) A Shamasdin	6	1	[5]

Semifinals
1	(Germany) M Emmrich (Sweden) A Siljeström	3	5
3	(Poland) T Bednarek (France) O Charroin	6	7
(Italy) T Fabbiano (Romania) F Mergea	1	3
Alt	(Germany) Jaan-Frederik Brunken (Germany) Stefan Seifert	6	6

Final
3	(Poland) T Bednarek (France) O Charroin	6	6
Alt	(Germany) Jaan-Frederik Brunken (Germany) Stefan Seifert	3	2
