= 2015 Challenger Banque Nationale de Drummondville – Singles =

Singles
- 2015 Challenger Banque Nationale de Drummondville

Final
- Champion: (Australia) John-Patrick Smith
- Runner-up: (Canada) Frank Dancevic
- Score: 6–7^{(11–13)}, 7–6^{(7–3)}, 7–5

Events
Singles	Doubles
- Challenger de Drummondville

Sam Groth was the defending champion, having won the event in 2014 in Rimouski, but decided not to participate this year.

John-Patrick Smith won the title, defeating Frank Dancevic 6–7^{(11–13)}, 7–6^{(7–3)}, 7–5 in the final.

== Seeds ==
1. (Slovakia) Lukáš Lacko (second round)
2. (Germany) Andreas Beck (second round)
3. (Italy) Luca Vanni (first round)
4. (Slovakia) Norbert Gombos (second round)
5. (Colombia) Alejandro Falla (second round)
6. (Belgium) Ruben Bemelmans (first round)
7. (Canada) Frank Dancevic (final)
8. (Belgium) Maxime Authom (second round, retired)

== Draw ==
Key

- Q = Qualifier
- WC = Wild card
- LL = Lucky loser
- Alt = Alternate
- ITF = ITF entry
- PR = Protected ranking
- SR = Special ranking
- SE = Special exempt
- JE = Junior exempt
- JR = Junior Accelerator Programme entrant
- CO = College Accelerator Programme entrant
- NG = Next Gen Accelerator Program entrant
- w/o = Walkover
- r = Retired
- d = Defaulted

=== Finals ===
Semifinals
(Australia) John-Patrick Smith	6	6
Alt	(Belgium) Germain Gigounon	2	3
7	(Canada) Frank Dancevic	6	6
Alt	(Bulgaria) Dimitar Kutrovsky	2	4

Final
(Australia) John-Patrick Smith	6^{11}	7^{7}	7
7	(Canada) Frank Dancevic	7^{13}	6^{3}	5

=== Top half ===
First round
1	(Slovakia) L Lacko	7	6
Q	(United States) A El Mihdawy	5	4
Q	(United States) K King	6	4	6
(United States) D Novikov	4	6	3
(United States) D Nguyen	7^{9}	4	4
(Australia) J-P Smith	6^{7}	6	6
Alt	(United States) J Jung	2	6	1
5	(Colombia) A Falla	6	1	6
3	(Italy) L Vanni	4	7	3
Alt	(Belgium) G Gigounon	6	5	6
Alt	(Czech Republic) M Michalička	6	6
Alt	(Ecuador) G Escobar	4	2
(United States) J Jenkins	6	2	7^{10}
WC	(Canada) P Bester	2	6	6^{8}
WC	(Canada) Pavel Krainik	2	4
8	(Belgium) M Authom	6	6

Second round
1	(Slovakia) L Lacko	4	6	4
Q	(United States) K King	6	4	6
(Australia) J-P Smith	3	6	6
5	(Colombia) A Falla	6	4	4
Alt	(Belgium) G Gigounon	7^{7}	6
Alt	(Czech Republic) M Michalička	6^{5}	4
(United States) J Jenkins	6	4
8	(Belgium) M Authom	3	0^{r}

Quarterfinals
Q	(United States) K King	6^{6}	6	3
(Australia) J-P Smith	7^{8}	3	6
Alt	(Belgium) G Gigounon	7^{7}	3	7
(United States) J Jenkins	6^{5}	6	5

Semifinals
(Australia) J-P Smith	6	6
Alt	(Belgium) G Gigounon	2	3

=== Bottom half ===
First round
7	(Canada) F Dancevic	6	6
PR	(United States) T Sandgren	3	3
LL	(South Africa) F Wolmarans	6	6
Alt	(Colombia) E Struvay	1	3
(United Kingdom) E Corrie	3	2
Q	(Italy) M Donati	6	6
(Sweden) E Ymer	1	0
4	(Slovakia) N Gombos	6	6
6	(Belgium) R Bemelmans	5	6	2
Alt	(Bulgaria) D Kutrovsky	7	0	6
(France) Jules Marie	6^{5}	2
(Argentina) M Trungelliti	7^{7}	6
(United States) A Kuznetsov	5	6	6
WC	(Canada) David Volfson	7	1	2
WC	(Canada) F Peliwo	2	1
2	(Germany) A Beck	6	6

Second round
7	(Canada) F Dancevic	6	6^{2}	7^{10}
LL	(South Africa) F Wolmarans	3	7^{7}	6^{8}
Q	(Italy) M Donati	7^{7}	6
4	(Slovakia) N Gombos	6^{5}	3
Alt	(Bulgaria) D Kutrovsky	6	6
(Argentina) M Trungelliti	4	4
(United States) A Kuznetsov	7	1	6
2	(Germany) A Beck	5	6	3

Quarterfinals
7	(Canada) F Dancevic	6	6
Q	(Italy) M Donati	4	4
Alt	(Bulgaria) D Kutrovsky	6	6
(United States) A Kuznetsov	4	3

Semifinals
7	(Canada) F Dancevic	6	6
Alt	(Bulgaria) D Kutrovsky	2	4
