= 2013 Challenger Banque Nationale de Rimouski – Singles =

Singles
- 2013 Challenger Banque Nationale de Rimouski

Final
- Champion: (South Africa) Rik de Voest
- Runner-up: (Canada) Vasek Pospisil
- Score: 7–6^{(8–6)}, 6–4

Events
Singles	Doubles
← 2012 ·	Challenger de Rimouski	· 2014 →

Vasek Pospisil was the defending champion but lost the final 6–7^{(6–8)}, 4–6 to quailificant Rik de Voest.

== Seeds ==
1. (Canada) Vasek Pospisil (final)
2. (Tunisia) Malek Jaziri (first round)
3. (Japan) Yūichi Sugita (quarterfinals)
4. (Australia) John Millman (second round)
5. (United States) Bobby Reynolds (semifinals)
6. (Germany) Cedrik-Marcel Stebe (second round)
7. (Poland) Michał Przysiężny (second round)
8. (Chinese Taipei) Jimmy Wang (second round)

== Draw ==
=== Key ===
- Q = Qualifier
- WC = Wild card
- LL = Lucky loser
- Alt = Alternate
- SE = Special exempt
- PR = Protected ranking
- ITF = ITF entry
- JE = Junior exempt
- w/o = Walkover
- r = Retired
- d = Defaulted
- SR = Special ranking

=== Finals ===
Semifinals
1	(Canada) Vasek Pospisil	7	6
(Bosnia and Herzegovina) Aldin Šetkić	5	4
5	(United States) Bobby Reynolds	6	1	4
Q	(South Africa) Rik de Voest	4	6	6

Final
1	(Canada) Vasek Pospisil	6^{6}	4
Q	(South Africa) Rik de Voest	7^{8}	6

=== Top half ===
First round
1	(Canada) V Pospisil	6	3	7^{7}
(United Kingdom) J Baker	4	6	6^{5}
(France) V Millot	3	6	6
WC	(Canada) F Peliwo	6	3	2
(Republic of Ireland) J McGee	6	6
(Canada) P Polansky	4	4
(Australia) J-P Smith	2	6^{1}
8	(Chinese Taipei) J Wang	6	7^{7}
4	(Australia) J Millman	6	4	6
(United States) C Buchanan	0	6	1
(Australia) S Groth	6	4	7^{7}
(South Africa) F Wolmarans	4	6	6^{2}
WC	(Canada) Hugo Di Feo	3	2
(Bosnia and Herzegovina) A Šetkić	6	6
(United States) A Kuznetsov	1	7^{7}	6^{4}
7	(Poland) M Przysiężny	6	6^{2}	7^{7}

Second round
1	(Canada) V Pospisil	6	7^{7}
(France) V Millot	1	6^{1}
(Republic of Ireland) J McGee	5	6	6
8	(Chinese Taipei) J Wang	7	4	2
4	(Australia) J Millman	6^{4}	3
(Australia) S Groth	7^{7}	6
(Bosnia and Herzegovina) A Šetkić	7^{7}	6
7	(Poland) M Przysiężny	6^{4}	3

Quarterfinals
1	(Canada) V Pospisil	6	6^{5}	7
(Republic of Ireland) J McGee	3	7^{7}	5
(Australia) S Groth	6	3	4
(Bosnia and Herzegovina) A Šetkić	2	6	6

Semifinals
1	(Canada) V Pospisil	7	6
(Bosnia and Herzegovina) A Šetkić	5	4

=== Bottom half ===
First round
5	(United States) B Reynolds	6	6
(Belgium) Y Reuter	1	4
(Canada) É Chvojka	6	6
WC	(Canada) B Schnur	3	2
(United Kingdom) J Ward	3	6	6
(United States) D Zivkovic	6	1	1
WC	(Belgium) M Authom	0^{r}
3	(Japan) Y Sugita	2
6	(Germany) C-M Stebe	4
(South Africa) I van der Merwe	3^{r}
WC	(Canada) Milan Pokrajac	7	4	3
Q	(South Africa) R de Voest	5	6	6
Q	(Japan) H Moriya	7^{12}	4	3
(United Kingdom) A Bogdanovic	6^{10}	6	6
Q	(United States) A El-Mihdawy	6	3	7^{7}
2	(Tunisia) M Jaziri	3	6	6^{4}

Second round
5	(United States) B Reynolds	6	6
(Canada) É Chvojka	4	2
(United Kingdom) J Ward	5	4
3	(Japan) Y Sugita	7	6
6	(Germany) C-M Stebe	6^{4}	6	3
Q	(South Africa) R de Voest	7^{7}	2	6
(United Kingdom) A Bogdanovic	6	6
Q	(United States) A El-Mihdawy	2	4

Quarterfinals
5	(United States) B Reynolds	6	4	6
3	(Japan) Y Sugita	2	6	1
Q	(South Africa) R de Voest	6	6
(United Kingdom) A Bogdanovic	4	3

Semifinals
5	(United States) B Reynolds	6	1	4
Q	(South Africa) R de Voest	4	6	6
