= 2011 Erste Bank Open – Singles Qualifying =

This article displays the qualifying draw of the 2011 Erste Bank Open.

== Players ==
=== Seeds ===
1. (Germany) Matthias Bachinger (second round)
2. (Slovakia) Martin Kližan (first round)
3. (Spain) Daniel Gimeno-Traver (qualifying competition)
4. (Belgium) Steve Darcis (qualified)
5. (Germany) Cedrik-Marcel Stebe (second round)
6. (France) Stéphane Robert (first round)
7. (United States) Sam Querrey (first round)
8. (Slovenia) Grega Žemlja (first round)

=== Qualifiers ===
1. (Germany) Tommy Haas
2. (Germany) Daniel Brands
3. (Slovenia) Aljaž Bedene
4. (Belgium) Steve Darcis

== Qualifying draw ==
=== First qualifier ===
First Round
1	(Germany) Matthias Bachinger	6	6
WC	(Austria) Gerald Melzer	1	2
WC	(Germany) Tommy Haas	6	6
(Romania) Marius Copil	4	2
WC	(Italy) Riccardo Bellotti	6^{3}	5
(United States) Rajeev Ram	7^{7}	7
(Spain) Arnau Brugués-Davi	4	0
5	(Germany) Cedrik-Marcel Stebe	6	6

Second Round
1	(Germany) Matthias Bachinger	4	4
WC	(Germany) Tommy Haas	6	6
(United States) Rajeev Ram	7^{7}	7^{7}
5	(Germany) Cedrik-Marcel Stebe	6^{4}	6^{1}

Qualifying Competition
WC	(Germany) Tommy Haas	6	6
(United States) Rajeev Ram	3	4

=== Second qualifier ===
First Round
2	(Slovakia) Martin Kližan	5	2
(Belgium) Ruben Bemelmans	7	6
(Poland) Michał Przysiężny	6	6
(Germany) Simon Greul	2	4
(Germany) Daniel Brands	6^{3}	7^{7}	6
(Germany) Rainer Schüttler	7^{7}	6^{4}	2
(Czech Republic) Jan Hájek	7	7
7	(United States) Sam Querrey	5	5

Second Round
(Belgium) Ruben Bemelmans	7^{8}	6
(Poland) Michał Przysiężny	6^{2}	2
(Germany) Daniel Brands	6	6
(Czech Republic) Jan Hájek	3	4

Qualifying Competition
(Belgium) Ruben Bemelmans	6^{3}	6	6^{4}
(Germany) Daniel Brands	7^{7}	2	7^{7}

=== Third qualifier ===
First Round
3	(Spain) Daniel Gimeno-Traver	6	6
(Argentina) Federico Delbonis	4	4
(Netherlands) Igor Sijsling	3	3
(Germany) Björn Phau	6	6
WC	(Austria) Tristan-Samuel Weissborn	3	3
(Spain) Iñigo Cervantes Huegun	6	6
(Slovenia) Aljaž Bedene	7^{8}	6
6	(France) Stéphane Robert	6^{6}	3

Second Round
3	(Spain) Daniel Gimeno-Traver	6	7^{7}
(Germany) Björn Phau	3	6^{4}
(Spain) Iñigo Cervantes Huegun	6^{2}	6	1
(Slovenia) Aljaž Bedene	7^{7}	2	6

Qualifying Competition
3	(Spain) Daniel Gimeno-Traver	4	6^{4}
(Slovenia) Aljaž Bedene	6	7^{7}

=== Fourth qualifier ===
First Round
4	(Belgium) Steve Darcis	6	6
(Spain) Guillermo Olaso	3	4
(Italy) Simone Bolelli	7^{7}	6
(Germany) Julian Reister	6^{3}	4
(Poland) Jerzy Janowicz	7^{14}	6
(Czech Republic) Ivo Minář	6^{12}	1
(Belgium) Maxime Authom	6	6
8	(Slovenia) Grega Žemlja	2	3

Second Round
4	(Belgium) Steve Darcis	7	3	6
(Italy) Simone Bolelli	5	6	4
(Poland) Jerzy Janowicz	6	5	6^{2}
(Belgium) Maxime Authom	3	7	7^{7}

Qualifying Competition
4	(Belgium) Steve Darcis	6	6
(Belgium) Maxime Authom	3	2
