= 2015 Challenger Banque Nationale de Drummondville – Doubles =

Doubles
- 2015 Challenger Banque Nationale de Drummondville

Final
- Champions: (Canada) Philip Bester (Australia) Chris Guccione
- Runners-up: (Canada) Frank Dancevic (Germany) Frank Moser
- Score: 6–4, 7–6^{(8–6)}

Events
Singles	Doubles
- Challenger de Drummondville

Edward Corrie and Daniel Smethurst were the defending champions, having won the event in 2014 in Rimouski, but Smethurst decided not to participate this year. Corrie partnered with Alex Kuznetsov, but lost in the semifinals to Philip Bester and Chris Guccione.

Bester and Guccione won the title, defeating Frank Dancevic and Frank Moser 6–4, 7–6^{(8–6)} in the final.

== Seeds ==
1. (Canada) Adil Shamasdin / (Australia) John-Patrick Smith (first round, withdrew)
2. (United States) Kevin King / (South Africa) Dean O'Brien (semifinals)
3. (Canada) Frank Dancevic / (Germany) Frank Moser (final)
4. (Canada) Philip Bester / (Australia) Chris Guccione (champions)

== Draw ==
Key

- Q = Qualifier
- WC = Wild card
- LL = Lucky loser
- Alt = Alternate
- ITF = ITF entry
- PR = Protected ranking
- SR = Special ranking
- SE = Special exempt
- JE = Junior exempt
- JR = Junior Accelerator Programme entrant
- CO = College Accelerator Programme entrant
- NG = Next Gen Accelerator Program entrant
- w/o = Walkover
- r = Retired
- d = Defaulted

First round
1	(Canada) A Shamasdin (Australia) J-P Smith
(Colombia) A Falla (Colombia) E Struvay	w/o
(Belgium) M Authom (Belgium) R Bemelmans
(United Kingdom) E Corrie (United States) A Kuznetsov	w/o
4/PR	(Canada) P Bester (Australia) C Guccione	7	6
(Slovakia) N Gombos (Slovakia) L Lacko	5	1
(Argentina) M Trungelliti (Canada) David Volfson	7^{8}	3	[7]
Alt	(Slovakia) K Beck (Slovakia) Boris Borgula	6^{6}	6	[10]
(Italy) M Donati (Italy) G Mager	6	4	[7]
(Canada) Isade Juneau (Canada) F Peliwo	4	6	[10]
(Belgium) G Gigounon (Czech Republic) M Michalička	4	2
3	(Canada) F Dancevic (Germany) F Moser	6	6
(Ecuador) G Escobar (Bulgaria) D Kutrovsky	6	7^{7}
WC	(Canada) Pavel Krainik (Canada) Tommy Mylnikov	0	6^{4}
(United States) J Cerretani (Italy) L Vanni
2	(United States) K King (South Africa) D O'Brien	w/o

Quarterfinals
(Colombia) A Falla (Colombia) E Struvay	6	5	[4]
(United Kingdom) E Corrie (United States) A Kuznetsov	3	7	[10]
4/PR	(Canada) P Bester (Australia) C Guccione	6	6
Alt	(Slovakia) K Beck (Slovakia) B Borgula	2	2
(Canada) I Juneau (Canada) F Peliwo	3	2
3	(Canada) F Dancevic (Germany) F Moser	6	6
(Ecuador) G Escobar (Bulgaria) D Kutrovsky	5	6	[9]
2	(United States) K King (South Africa) D O'Brien	7	4	[11]

Semifinals
(United Kingdom) E Corrie (United States) A Kuznetsov	5	6	[6]
4/PR	(Canada) P Bester (Australia) C Guccione	7	4	[10]
3	(Canada) F Dancevic (Germany) F Moser	7	7
2	(United States) K King (South Africa) D O'Brien	5	5

Final
4/PR	(Canada) P Bester (Australia) C Guccione	6	7^{8}
3	(Canada) F Dancevic (Germany) F Moser	4	6^{6}
