= 2022 Challenger Banque Nationale de Drummondville =

- Date: November 14 – 20
- Edition: 15th
- Category: ATP Challenger Tour
- Surface: Hard (indoor)
- Location: Drummondville, Canada

Champions

Singles
- (Canada) Vasek Pospisil

Doubles
- (United Kingdom) Julian Cash / (United Kingdom) Henry Patten
- Challenger de Drummondville

The 2022 Challenger Banque Nationale de Drummondville was a professional tennis tournament played on indoor hard courts. It was the 15th edition of the tournament and part of the 2022 ATP Challenger Tour. It took place in Drummondville, Canada between November 14 and 20, 2022.

== Singles main-draw entrants ==
=== Seeds ===
Country	Player	Rank^{1}	Seed
ECU	Emilio Gómez	107	1
USA	Michael Mmoh	115	2
CAN	Vasek Pospisil	118	3
ARG	Juan Pablo Ficovich	140	4
~~FRA~~	~~Enzo Couacaud~~	~~183~~	~~5~~
FRA	Antoine Escoffier	216	6
CAN	Alexis Galarneau	222	7
CAN	Gabriel Diallo	248	8

- ^{1} Rankings are as of November 7, 2022.

=== Other entrants ===
The following players received wildcards into the singles main draw:

- (Canada) Taha Baadi
- (Canada) Justin Boulais
- (Canada) Marko Stakusic

The following player received entry into the singles main draw using a protected ranking:

- (Italy) Julian Ocleppo

The following player received entry into the singles main draw as an alternate:

- (Tunisia) Malek Jaziri

The following players received entry from the qualifying draw:

- (Canada) Liam Draxl
- (Poland) Maks Kaśnikowski
- (Canada) Joshua Lapadat
- (Germany) Max Hans Rehberg
- (United States) Roy Smith
- (Germany) Kai Wehnelt

The following player received entry as a lucky loser:

- (Germany) Constantin Frantzen
- (Croatia) Roko Horvat

== Champions ==
=== Singles ===
- (Canada) Vasek Pospisil def. (United States) Michael Mmoh 7–6^{(7–5)}, 4–6, 6–4.

=== Doubles ===
- (United Kingdom) Julian Cash / (United Kingdom) Henry Patten def. (United Kingdom) Arthur Fery / (United Kingdom) Giles Hussey 6–3, 6–3.
