= 2012 Challenger Banque Nationale de Rimouski – Singles =

Singles
- 2012 Challenger Banque Nationale de Rimouski

Final
- Champion: (Canada) Vasek Pospisil
- Runner-up: (Belgium) Maxime Authom
- Score: 7–6^{(8–6)}, 6–4

Events
| Singles | Doubles |
| ← 2011 · | Challenger de Rimouski | · 2013 → |

Fritz Wolmarans was the defending champion.

Vasek Pospisil won the title by defeating Maxime Authom 7–6^{(8–6)}, 6–4 in the final.

== Seeds ==
1. (Japan) Tatsuma Ito (semifinals)
2. (Canada) Vasek Pospisil (champion)
3. (South Africa) Izak van der Merwe (first round)
4. (Germany) Dominik Meffert (first round)
5. (Germany) Denis Gremelmayr (first round)
6. (Belgium) Maxime Authom (final)
7. (Germany) Peter Gojowczyk (first round)
8. (Switzerland) Stéphane Bohli (quarterfinals)

== Draw ==
=== Key ===
- Q = Qualifier
- WC = Wild card
- LL = Lucky loser
- Alt = Alternate
- SE = Special exempt
- PR = Protected ranking
- ITF = ITF entry
- JE = Junior exempt
- w/o = Walkover
- r = Retired
- d = Defaulted
- SR = Special ranking

=== Finals ===
Semifinals
1 | (Japan) Tatsuma Ito | 6 | 3 | 6^{5}
6 | (Belgium) Maxime Authom | 1 | 6 | 7^{7}
WC | (Canada) Filip Peliwo | 2 | 3
2 | (Canada) Vasek Pospisil | 6 | 6

Final
6 | (Belgium) Maxime Authom | 6^{6} | 4
2 | (Canada) Vasek Pospisil | 7^{8} | 6

=== Top half ===
First round
1 | (Japan) T Ito | 6 | 3 | 7
(Poland) G Panfil | 4 | 6 | 5
(Germany) Stefan Seifert | 7^{7} | 7^{9}
Q | (United States) D Britton | 6^{5} | 6^{7}
WC | (Canada) Samuel Monette | 6 | 4 | 2
(France) P-H Herbert | 3 | 6 | 6
Q | (France) C Reix | 6 | 6
5 | (Germany) D Gremelmayr | 4 | 2
4 | (Germany) D Meffert | 3 | 4
(Switzerland) M Lammer | 6 | 6
(Canada) É Chvojka | 6 | 6
Q | (Barbados) H Lewis | 3 | 4
Q | (United States) A Krajicek | 3 | 3
(Belgium) G Gigounon | 6 | 6
(United Kingdom) A Bogdanovic | 1 | 2
6 | (Belgium) M Authom | 6 | 6

Second round
1 | (Japan) T Ito | 6 | 6
(Germany) Stefan Seifert | 3 | 1
(France) P-H Herbert | 7^{7} | 6^{5} | 2
Q | (France) C Reix | 6^{5} | 7^{7} | 6
(Switzerland) M Lammer | 5 | 4
(Canada) É Chvojka | 7 | 6
(Belgium) G Gigounon | 1^{r}
6 | (Belgium) M Authom | 3

Quarterfinals
1 | (Japan) T Ito | 7^{8} | 7
Q | (France) C Reix | 6^{6} | 5
(Canada) É Chvojka | 2 | 6^{1}
6 | (Belgium) M Authom | 6 | 7^{7}

Semifinals
1 | (Japan) T Ito | 6 | 3 | 6^{5}
6 | (Belgium) M Authom | 1 | 6 | 7^{7}

=== Bottom half ===
First round
7 | (Germany) P Gojowczyk | 4 | 4
(France) V Millot | 6 | 6
WC | (Canada) F Peliwo | 4 | 6 | 6
(United States) A El Mihdawy | 6 | 0 | 3
(France) M Rodrigues | 6 | 6
WC | (Canada) Milan Pokrajac | 4 | 4
(United States) B Strode | 2 | 7^{7} | 6
3 | (South Africa) I van der Merwe | 6 | 6^{4} | 4
8 | (Switzerland) S Bohli | 6 | 6
(United Kingdom) A Ward | 1 | 4
(South Africa) F Wolmarans | 3
WC | (Canada) P Bester | 0r
Alt | (Germany) J F Brunken | 7^{7} | 6
(Italy) T Fabbiano | 6^{0} | 0
(Belgium) Alexandre Folie | 0r
2 | (Canada) V Pospisil | 3

Second round
(France) V Millot | 6^{4} | 2
WC | (Canada) F Peliwo | 7^{7} | 6
(France) M Rodrigues | 7^{7} | 6
(United States) B Strode | 6^{3} | 3
8 | (Switzerland) S Bohli | 2 | 6 | 6
(South Africa) F Wolmarans | 6 | 3 | 4
Alt | (Germany) J F Brunken | 6^{2} | 6^{5}
2 | (Canada) V Pospisil | 7^{7} | 7^{7}

Quarterfinals
WC | (Canada) F Peliwo | 2 | 6 | 7^{7}
(France) M Rodrigues | 6 | 3 | 6^{0}
8 | (Switzerland) S Bohli | 3 | 6 | 4
2 | (Canada) V Pospisil | 6 | 2 | 6

Semifinals
WC | (Canada) F Peliwo | 2 | 3
2 | (Canada) V Pospisil | 6 | 6
