= 2022 Challenger Banque Nationale de Drummondville – Doubles =

Doubles
- 2022 Challenger Banque Nationale de Drummondville

Final
- Champions: (United Kingdom) Julian Cash (United Kingdom) Henry Patten
- Runners-up: (United Kingdom) Arthur Fery (United Kingdom) Giles Hussey
- Score: 6–3, 6–3

Events
Singles	Doubles
- Challenger de Drummondville

Manuel Guinard and Arthur Rinderknech were the defending champions but chose not to defend their title.

Julian Cash and Henry Patten won the title after defeating Arthur Fery and Giles Hussey 6–3, 6–3 in the final.

== Seeds ==
1. (United Kingdom) Julian Cash / (United Kingdom) Henry Patten (champions)
2. (United States) Evan King / (United States) Max Schnur (first round)
3. (Austria) Maximilian Neuchrist / (Greece) Michail Pervolarakis (first round)
4. (United Kingdom) Charles Broom / (Germany) Constantin Frantzen (semifinals)

== Draw ==
Key

- Q = Qualifier
- WC = Wild card
- LL = Lucky loser
- Alt = Alternate
- ITF = ITF entry
- PR = Protected ranking
- SR = Special ranking
- SE = Special exempt
- JE = Junior exempt
- JR = Junior Accelerator Programme entrant
- CO = College Accelerator Programme entrant
- NG = Next Gen Accelerator Program entrant
- w/o = Walkover
- r = Retired
- d = Defaulted

First round
1	(United Kingdom) J Cash (United Kingdom) H Patten	6	3	[10]
(Belgium) M Geerts (Israel) E Leshem	3	6	[6]
(Italy) J Ocleppo (Germany) K Wehnelt	w/o
(Tunisia) A Dougaz (Tunisia) M Jaziri
4	(United Kingdom) C Broom (Germany) C Frantzen	6	6
WC	(Canada) Adam Farag Cao (Canada) Miko Lapalme	3	3
(Croatia) Z Babić (Canada) K Stevenson	6^{7}	6	[11]
(Canada) Marko Stakusic (Canada) Jaden Weekes	7^{9}	1	[9]
(Canada) L Draxl (Canada) Joshua Lapadat	6	6
(Italy) G Oradini (Czech Republic) D Poljak	4	4
(United Kingdom) A Fery (United Kingdom) G Hussey	6	6
3	(Austria) M Neuchrist (Greece) M Pervolarakis	4	0
(France) A Escoffier (Italy) A Motti	6	6
WC	(Canada) Aurel Ciocanu (Canada) Nicaise Muamba	4	2
(Canada) A Galarneau (Canada) B Sigouin	7^{7}	7^{7}
2	(United States) E King (United States) M Schnur	6^{4}	6^{4}

Quarterfinals
1	(United Kingdom) J Cash (United Kingdom) H Patten	6	7
(Italy) J Ocleppo (Germany) K Wehnelt	3	5
4	(United Kingdom) C Broom (Germany) C Frantzen	6	6
(Croatia) Z Babić (Canada) K Stevenson	4	4
(Canada) L Draxl (Canada) J Lapadat	4	2
(United Kingdom) A Fery (United Kingdom) G Hussey	6	6
(France) A Escoffier (Italy) A Motti	6	5	[10]
(Canada) A Galarneau (Canada) B Sigouin	4	7	[6]

Semifinals
1	(United Kingdom) J Cash (United Kingdom) H Patten	6	6
4	(United Kingdom) C Broom (Germany) C Frantzen	3	3
(United Kingdom) A Fery (United Kingdom) G Hussey	w/o
(France) A Escoffier (Italy) A Motti

Final
1	(United Kingdom) J Cash (United Kingdom) H Patten	6	6
(United Kingdom) A Fery (United Kingdom) G Hussey	3	3
