= 2026 Challenger Banque Nationale de Drummondville – Singles =

Singles
- 2026 Challenger Banque Nationale de Drummondville

Final
- Champion: (Switzerland) Dylan Dietrich
- Runner-up: (Canada) Liam Draxl
- Score: 6–1, 6–2

Events
Singles	Doubles
- Challenger de Drummondville

Daniil Glinka was the defending champion but chose not to defend his title.

Dylan Dietrich won the title after defeating Liam Draxl 6–1, 6–2 in the final.

== Seeds ==
1. (Colombia) Nicolás Mejía (first round)
2. (France) Clément Chidekh (semifinals)
3. (United States) Darwin Blanch (quarterfinals)
4. (United States) Michael Mmoh (first round)
5. (Canada) Liam Draxl (final)
6. (Switzerland) Dylan Dietrich (champion)
7. (Canada) Alexis Galarneau (first round)
8. (United States) Stefan Kozlov (quarterfinals)

== Draw ==
Key

- Q = Qualifier
- WC = Wild card
- LL = Lucky loser
- Alt = Alternate
- ITF = ITF entry
- PR = Protected ranking
- SR = Special ranking
- SE = Special exempt
- JE = Junior exempt
- JR = Junior Accelerator Programme entrant
- CO = College Accelerator Programme entrant
- NG = Next Gen Accelerator Program entrant
- w/o = Walkover
- r = Retired
- d = Defaulted

=== Finals ===
Semifinals
(Japan) James Trotter	2	2
5	(Canada) Liam Draxl	6	6
6	(Switzerland) Dylan Dietrich	7^{7}	6
2	(France) Clément Chidekh	6^{1}	3

Final
5	(Canada) Liam Draxl	1	2
6	(Switzerland) Dylan Dietrich	6	6

=== Top half ===
First round
1	(Colombia) N Mejía	6^{5}	6	6^{5}
(Germany) L Wessels	7^{7}	4	7^{7}
(Japan) J Trotter	3	6	6
Q	(Australia) J Charlton	6	4	3
(United States) B Shick	7	2	3
(United States) A Mayo	5	6	6
(Czech Republic) H Bartoň	6	6^{5}	7
7	(Canada) A Galarneau	3	7^{7}	5
3	(United States) Dar Blanch	7^{7}	6
(Northern Mariana Islands) C Sinclair	6^{4}	1
(Netherlands) N Visker	4	2
Q	(United States) S Banerjee	6	6
(United States) D Milavsky	6	6
Q	(Romania) Vladislav Melnic	4	2
WC	(Canada) Keegan Rice	6	4	0^{r}
5	(Canada) L Draxl	3	6	4

Second round
(Germany) L Wessels	4	3
(Japan) J Trotter	6	6
(United States) A Mayo	6	7^{7}
(Czech Republic) H Bartoň	4	6^{4}
3	(United States) Dar Blanch	6	6
Q	(United States) S Banerjee	4	4
(United States) D Milavsky	6	6^{3}	6^{5}
5	(Canada) L Draxl	3	7^{7}	7^{7}

Quarterfinals
(Japan) J Trotter	7^{7}	2	7^{7}
(United States) A Mayo	6^{5}	6	6^{5}
3	(United States) Dar Blanch	7^{7}	3	3
5	(Canada) L Draxl	6^{5}	6	6

Semifinals
(Japan) J Trotter	2	2
5	(Canada) L Draxl	6	6

=== Bottom half ===
First round
6	(Switzerland) D Dietrich	6	7
(Bulgaria) P Nesterov	2	5
(United States) C Kingsley	7	6^{6}	6^{4}
(Canada) J Boulais	5	7^{8}	7^{7}
Q	(United States) Theodore Dean	2	6^{4}
(Poland) M Kaśnikowski	6	7^{7}
(Canada) D Chan	6	6
4	(United States) M Mmoh	3	4
8	(United States) S Kozlov	6	0
Q	(Netherlands) D de Jonge	0	0^{r}
Q	(United States) Vignesh Gogineni	7^{7}	7
(Germany) M Wiskandt	6^{4}	5
(Germany) P Zahraj	6	1	6
WC	(Canada) Alvin Nicholas Tudorica	2	6	3
WC	(Canada) Mikael Arseneault	0	4
2	(France) C Chidekh	6	6

Second round
6	(Switzerland) D Dietrich	6	7^{7}
(Canada) J Boulais	2	6^{4}
(Poland) M Kaśnikowski	3	4
(Canada) D Chan	6	6
8	(United States) S Kozlov	6	6
Q	(United States) V Gogineni	3	2
(Germany) P Zahraj	3	3
2	(France) C Chidekh	6	6

Quarterfinals
6	(Switzerland) D Dietrich	7^{7}	6
(Canada) D Chan	6^{5}	2
8	(United States) S Kozlov	2	6^{5}
2	(France) C Chidekh	6	7^{7}

Semifinals
6	(Switzerland) D Dietrich	7^{7}	6
2	(France) C Chidekh	6^{1}	3
