= 2022 Challenger Banque Nationale de Drummondville – Singles =

Singles
- 2022 Challenger Banque Nationale de Drummondville

Final
- Champion: (Canada) Vasek Pospisil
- Runner-up: (United States) Michael Mmoh
- Score: 7–6^{(7–5)}, 4–6, 6–4

Events
| Singles | Doubles |
- Challenger de Drummondville

Maxime Cressy was the defending champion but chose not to defend his title.

Vasek Pospisil won the title after defeating Michael Mmoh 7–6^{(7–5)}, 4–6, 6–4 in the final.

== Seeds ==
1. (Ecuador) Emilio Gómez (second round)
2. (United States) Michael Mmoh (final)
3. (Canada) Vasek Pospisil (champion)
4. (Argentina) Juan Pablo Ficovich (first round)
5. (France) Enzo Couacaud (withdrew)
6. (France) Antoine Escoffier (semifinals)
7. (Canada) Alexis Galarneau (quarterfinals)
8. (Canada) Gabriel Diallo (second round)

== Draw ==
Key

- Q = Qualifier
- WC = Wild card
- LL = Lucky loser
- Alt = Alternate
- ITF = ITF entry
- PR = Protected ranking
- SR = Special ranking
- SE = Special exempt
- JE = Junior exempt
- JR = Junior Accelerator Programme entrant
- CO = College Accelerator Programme entrant
- NG = Next Gen Accelerator Program entrant
- w/o = Walkover
- r = Retired
- d = Defaulted

=== Finals ===
Semifinals
6 | (France) Antoine Escoffier | 3 | 6 | 3
3 | (Canada) Vasek Pospisil | 6 | 3 | 6
(Belgium) Michael Geerts | 2 | 0
2 | (United States) Michael Mmoh | 6 | 6

Final
3 | (Canada) Vasek Pospisil | 7^{7} | 4 | 6
2 | (United States) Michael Mmoh | 6^{5} | 6 | 4

=== Top half ===
First round
1 | (Ecuador) E Gómez | 6 | 6
(Colombia) N Mejía | 3 | 3
Q | (United States) Roy Smith | 2 | 6 | 2
(Tunisia) A Dougaz | 6 | 4 | 6
(Italy) G Oradini | 7^{7} | 5 | 6
WC | (Canada) Marko Stakusic | 6^{1} | 7 | 0
PR | (Italy) J Ocleppo | 6^{3} | 5
6 | (France) A Escoffier | 7^{7} | 7
3 | (Canada) V Pospisil | 6 | 6
Q | (Canada) L Draxl | 1 | 2
Q | (Canada) Joshua Lapadat | 2 | 2
(United States) U Blanch | 6 | 6
(France) H Mayot | 6 | 6
(Austria) M Neuchrist | 4 | 3
LL | (Croatia) Roko Horvat | 7^{7} | 6
LL | (Germany) C Frantzen | 6^{3} | 1

Second round
1 | (Ecuador) E Gómez | 6^{3} | 1
(Tunisia) A Dougaz | 7^{7} | 6
(Italy) G Oradini | 4 | 4
6 | (France) A Escoffier | 6 | 6
3 | (Canada) V Pospisil | 6 | 6
(United States) U Blanch | 4 | 3
(France) H Mayot | 7 | 6
LL | (Croatia) R Horvat | 5 | 0

Quarterfinals
(Tunisia) A Dougaz | 7^{15} | 6^{5} | 6^{2}
6 | (France) A Escoffier | 6^{13} | 7^{7} | 7^{7}
3 | (Canada) V Pospisil | 6 | 7^{7}
(France) H Mayot | 3 | 6^{3}

Semifinals
6 | (France) A Escoffier | 3 | 6 | 3
3 | (Canada) V Pospisil | 6 | 3 | 6

=== Bottom half ===
First round
7 | (Canada) A Galarneau | 3 | 6 | 7^{9}
(Brazil) G Décamps | 6 | 2 | 6^{7}
(Israel) E Leshem | 6^{3} | 3
WC | (Canada) J Boulais | 7^{7} | 6
WC | (Canada) T Baadi | 6 | 2 | 6
Alt | (Tunisia) M Jaziri | 3 | 6 | 4
(Belgium) M Geerts | 7^{12} | 4 | 7
4 | (Argentina) JP Ficovich | 6^{10} | 6 | 5
8 | (Canada) G Diallo | 6 | 7^{8}
Q | (Germany) K Wehnelt | 4 | 6^{6}
Q | (Germany) MH Rehberg | 4 | 0^{r}
(United Kingdom) C Broom | 6 | 1
Q | (Poland) M Kaśnikowski | 6 | 7
(Tunisia) S Mansouri | 4 | 5
(Monaco) V Vacherot | 5 | 2
2 | (United States) M Mmoh | 7 | 6

Second round
7 | (Canada) A Galarneau | 6 | 6
WC | (Canada) J Boulais | 2 | 1
WC | (Canada) T Baadi | 6 | 6^{8} | 4
(Belgium) M Geerts | 2 | 7^{10} | 6
8 | (Canada) G Diallo | 4 | 2
(United Kingdom) C Broom | 6 | 6
Q | (Poland) M Kaśnikowski | 3 | 5
2 | (United States) M Mmoh | 6 | 7

Quarterfinals
7 | (Canada) A Galarneau | 3 | 6 | 1
(Belgium) M Geerts | 6 | 3 | 6
(United Kingdom) C Broom | 0 | 5
2 | (United States) M Mmoh | 6 | 7

Semifinals
(Belgium) M Geerts | 2 | 0
2 | (United States) M Mmoh | 6 | 6
