= 2026 Challenger Banque Nationale de Drummondville =

- Date: November 16 – 22
- Edition: 19th
- Category: ATP Challenger Tour
- Surface: Hard (indoor)
- Location: Drummondville, Canada

Champions

Singles
- (Switzerland) Dylan Dietrich

Doubles
- (Mexico) Miguel Ángel Reyes-Varela / (United States) Reese Stalder
- Challenger de Drummondville

The 2026 Challenger Banque Nationale de Drummondville was a professional tennis tournament played on indoor hard courts. It was the 19th edition of the tournament and part of the 2026 ATP Challenger Tour. It took place in Drummondville, Canada between November 16 and 22, 2026.

== Singles main-draw entrants ==
=== Seeds ===
| Country | Player | Rank^{1} | Seed |
|---|---|---|---|
| COL | Nicolás Mejía | 114 | 1 |
| FRA | Clément Chidekh | 129 | 2 |
| USA | Darwin Blanch | 149 | 3 |
| USA | Michael Mmoh | 150 | 4 |
| CAN | Liam Draxl | 165 | 5 |
| SUI | Dylan Dietrich | 187 | 6 |
| CAN | Alexis Galarneau | 192 | 7 |
| USA | Stefan Kozlov | 205 | 8 |

- ^{1} Rankings are as of November 9, 2026.

=== Other entrants ===
The following players received wildcards into the singles main draw:

- (Canada) Mikael Arseneault
- (Canada) Keegan Rice
- (Canada) Alvin Nicholas Tudorica

The following players received entry from the qualifying draw:

- (United States) Samir Banerjee
- (Australia) Joshua Charlton
- (Netherlands) Daniel de Jonge
- (United States) Theodore Dean
- (United States) Vignesh Gogineni
- (Romania) Vladislav Melnic

== Champions ==
=== Singles ===
- (Switzerland) Dylan Dietrich def. (Canada) Liam Draxl 6–1, 6–2.

=== Doubles ===
- (Mexico) Miguel Ángel Reyes-Varela / (United States) Reese Stalder def. (United States) Nathaniel Lammons / (Australia) John-Patrick Smith 6–3, 6–7^{(4–7)}, [10–7].
