= 2026 Challenger Banque Nationale de Drummondville – Doubles =

Doubles
- 2026 Challenger Banque Nationale de Drummondville

Final
- Champions: (Mexico) Miguel Ángel Reyes-Varela (United States) Reese Stalder
- Runners-up: (United States) Nathaniel Lammons (Australia) John-Patrick Smith
- Score: 6–3, 6–7^{(4–7)}, [10–7]

Events
Singles	Doubles
- Challenger de Drummondville

Trey Hilderbrand and Mac Kiger were the defending champions but chose not to defend their title.

Miguel Ángel Reyes-Varela and Reese Stalder won the title after defeating Nathaniel Lammons and John-Patrick Smith 6–3, 6–7^{(4–7)}, [10–7] in the final.

== Seeds ==
1. (Mexico) Miguel Ángel Reyes-Varela / (United States) Reese Stalder (champions)
2. (United States) Nathaniel Lammons / (Australia) John-Patrick Smith (final)
3. (Australia) Joshua Charlton / (United Kingdom) Ben Jones (first round)
4. (Netherlands) Mats Hermans / (Netherlands) Niels Visker (semifinals)

== Draw ==
Key

- Q = Qualifier
- WC = Wild card
- LL = Lucky loser
- Alt = Alternate
- ITF = ITF entry
- PR = Protected ranking
- SR = Special ranking
- SE = Special exempt
- JE = Junior exempt
- JR = Junior Accelerator Programme entrant
- CO = College Accelerator Programme entrant
- NG = Next Gen Accelerator Program entrant
- w/o = Walkover
- r = Retired
- d = Defaulted

First round
1	(Mexico) M Reyes-Varela (United States) R Stalder	6	6
Alt	(Canada) Volodymyr Gurenko (Canada) Niels Peter van Noord	3	1
(Canada) J Boulais (Japan) J Trotter	6	6
(Romania) Vladislav Melnic (Northern Mariana Islands) C Sinclair	1	3
3	(Australia) J Charlton (United Kingdom) B Jones	7	6^{5}	[10]
(United States) Vignesh Gogineni (United States) Noah Zamora	5	7^{7}	[12]
(United States) Matt Kuhar (South Korea) Roh Ho-young	6	3	[16]
WC	(Canada) Jared Horwood (Canada) Joshua Peck	3	6	[14]
(United States) Theodore Dean (United States) Aadarsh Tripathi	3	5
(Denmark) OB Poulsen (Sweden) Nikola Slavic	6	7
WC	(Canada) Benjamin Thomas George (Canada) Alvin Nicholas Tudorica	3	4
4	(Netherlands) M Hermans (Netherlands) N Visker	6	6
(Czech Republic) H Bartoň (Poland) M Kaśnikowski	6	4	[14]
(Netherlands) D de Jonge (Germany) J Opitz	4	6	[12]
(Colombia) N Mejía (Colombia) A Urrea	2	6	[3]
2	(United States) N Lammons (Australia) J-P Smith	6	4	[10]

Quarterfinals
1	(Mexico) M Reyes-Varela (United States) R Stalder	7^{7}	7^{7}
(Canada) J Boulais (Japan) J Trotter	6^{3}	6^{4}
(United States) V Gogineni (United States) N Zamora	6	6
(United States) M Kuhar (South Korea) H-y Roh	1	3
(Denmark) OB Poulsen (Sweden) N Slavic	3	6	[6]
4	(Netherlands) M Hermans (Netherlands) N Visker	6	3	[10]
(Czech Republic) H Bartoň (Poland) M Kaśnikowski
2	(United States) N Lammons (Australia) J-P Smith	w/o

Semifinals
1	(Mexico) M Reyes-Varela (United States) R Stalder	6	7
(United States) V Gogineni (United States) N Zamora	4	5
4	(Netherlands) M Hermans (Netherlands) N Visker	3	6^{1}
2	(United States) N Lammons (Australia) J-P Smith	6	7^{7}

Final
1	(Mexico) M Reyes-Varela (United States) R Stalder	6	6^{4}	[10]
2	(United States) N Lammons (Australia) J-P Smith	3	7^{7}	[7]
