= Visit Panamá Cup de Chitré =

ATP Challenger Tour
- Location: Chitré; Panama
- Venue: Centro de Alto Rendimiento Carlos Peralta de Chitré
- Category: ATP Challenger Tour
- Surface: Hard
- Draw: 32S/16Q/16D
- Prize money: US$40,000+H
- Notes: Website

The Visit Panamá Cup de Chitré is a tennis tournament held in Chitré, Panama since 2014. The event is part of the ATP Challenger Tour and is played on Hard courts.

== Past finals ==
=== Singles ===
Year	Champion	Runner-up	Score	Ref.
2014	(United States) Wayne Odesnik	(Chinese Taipei) Jimmy Wang	5–7, 6–4, 6–4	

=== Doubles ===
Year	Champions	Runners-up	Score	Ref.
2014	(United States) Kevin King (Colombia) Juan-Carlos Spir	(Puerto Rico) Alex Llompart (Argentina) Mateo Nicolas Martinez	7–6^{(7–5)}, 6–4	
