= Olivier Charroin =

French tennis player

- Country (sports): France
- Born: 10 March 1982 (age 44)
- Height: 1.84 m (6 ft 1/2 in)
- Turned pro: 2005
- Retired: 2014 (inactive)
- Plays: Leftt-handed (two-handed backhand)
- Prize money: US$93,881

Singles
- Career record: 0–0
- Career titles: 0
- Highest ranking: No. 523 (23 June 2008)
- Current ranking: No. 1,091 (29 August 2011)

Doubles
- Career record: 2–5
- Career titles: 0
- Highest ranking: No. 84 (21 May 2012)
- Current ranking: No. 84 (21 May 2012)

Grand Slam doubles results
- French Open: 1R (2012)
- Last updated on: 20 May 2012.

Olivier Charroin (born 10 March 1982) is a French former professional tennis player. He competes on the ATP Challenger Tour and ITF Futures, mainly in doubles competition. He reached his highest ATP singles ranking, No. 523 on 23 June 2008, and his highest ATP doubles ranking, No. 84, on 21 May 2012.

== Career finals ==
=== Doubles (10) ===
Legend ATP Challengers (10)	Finals by surface Hard (1–2) Clay (2–3) Grass (1–0) Carpet (1–0)

Outcome	No.	Date	Tournament	Surface	Partnering	Opponents in the final	Score
Runner-up	1.	6 February 2011	Courmayeur, Italy	Hard	(France) Alexandre Renard	(France) Marc Gicquel (France) Nicolas Mahut	3–6, 4–6
Winner	1.	1 May 2011	Ostrava, Czech Republic	Clay	(France) Stéphane Robert	(Latvia) Andis Juška (Russia) Alexandre Kudryavtsev	6–4, 6–3
Runner-up	2.	3 July 2011	Braunschweig, Germany	Clay	(France) Stéphane Robert	(Germany) Martin Emmrich (Sweden) Andreas Siljeström	6–0, 4–6, [7–10]
Runner-up	3.	17 July 2011	Sopot, Poland	Clay	(France) Stéphane Robert	(Poland) Mariusz Fyrstenberg (Poland) Marcin Matkowski	5–7, 6–7^{(4–7)}
Winner	2.	24 July 2011	Poznań, Poland	Clay	(France) Stéphane Robert	(Brazil) Franco Ferreiro (Brazil) André Sá	6–2, 6–3
Runner-up	4.	26 February 2012	Wolfsburg, Germany	Carpet (i)	(Poland) Tomasz Bednarek	(Lithuania) Laurynas Grigelis (Belarus) Uladzimir Ignatik	5–7, 6–4, [5–10]
Runner-up	5.	18 March 2012	Guadalajara, Mexico	Hard	(Poland) Tomasz Bednarek	(United States) James Cerretani (Canada) Adil Shamasdin	6–7^{(5–7)}, 1–6
Winner	3.	24 March 2012	Rimouski	Hard	(Poland) Tomasz Bednarek	(Germany) Jaan-Frederik Brunken (Germany) Stefan Seifert	6–3, 6–2
Runner-up	6.	20 May 2012	Bordeaux, France	Clay	(United Kingdom) Jonathan Marray	(Slovakia) Martin Kližan (Slovakia) Igor Zelenay	6–7^{(5–7)}, 6–4, [4–10]
Winner	4.	17 June 2012	Nottingham	Grass	(Austria) Martin Fischer	(Russia) Evgeny Donskoy (Russia) Andrey Kuznetsov	6–4, 7–6^{(8–6)}
