= Challenger de Drummondville =

Tennis tournament in Quebec, Canada

Challenger Banque Nationale de Drummondville
- 2026 Challenger Banque Nationale de Drummondville

ATP Challenger Tour
- Event name: Challenger de tennis Banque Nationale de Drummondville (présenté par Girardin since 2026)
- Founded: 2006; 20 years ago
- Location: Drummondville, Quebec, Canada
- Venue: Tennis intérieur René-Verrier
- Category: ATP Challenger Tour
- Surface: Hard (indoor)
- Draw: 32S (24Q) / 16D (0Q)
- Prize money: US$75,000
- Website: Official website

The Challenger Banque Nationale de Drummondville (présenté par Girardin for sponsorship reasons) is a professional tennis tournament held in Drummondville, Quebec, Canada, since 2015. It was held in Rimouski, Quebec, Canada, from 2006 to 2014. The event is part of the ATP Challenger Tour and is played on indoor hardcourts at the Tennis intérieur René-Verrier.

== Past finals ==
=== Singles ===
Location	Year	Champions	Runners-up	Score
Drummondville	2026	(Switzerland) Dylan Dietrich	(Canada) Liam Draxl	6–1, 6–2
Drummondville	2025	(Estonia) Daniil Glinka	(Canada) Duncan Chan	6–4, 6–2
Drummondville	2024	(United States) Aidan Mayo	(Luxembourg) Chris Rodesch	6–3, 3–6, 6–4
Drummondville	2023	(Belgium) Zizou Bergs	(Australia) James Duckworth	6–4, 7–5
Drummondville	2022	(Canada) Vasek Pospisil	(United States) Michael Mmoh	7–6^{(7–5)}, 4–6, 6–4
Drummondville	2021	Not held		
Drummondville	2020	(United States) Maxime Cressy	(France) Arthur Rinderknech	6–7^{(4–7)}, 6–4, 6–4
Drummondville	2019	(Lithuania) Ričardas Berankis	(Germany) Yannick Maden	6–3, 7–5
Drummondville	2018	(United States) Denis Kudla	(France) Benjamin Bonzi	6–0, 7–5
Drummondville	2017	(Canada) Denis Shapovalov	(Belgium) Ruben Bemelmans	6–3, 6–2
Drummondville	2016	(United Kingdom) Daniel Evans	(United Kingdom) Edward Corrie	6–3, 6–4
Drummondville	2015	(Australia) John-Patrick Smith	(Canada) Frank Dancevic	6–7^{(11–13)}, 7–6^{(7–3)}, 7–5
Rimouski
Rimouski	2014	(Australia) Sam Groth	(Croatia) Ante Pavić	7–6^{(7–3)}, 6–2
Rimouski	2013	(South Africa) Rik de Voest	(Canada) Vasek Pospisil	7–6^{(8–6)}, 6–4
Rimouski	2012	(Canada) Vasek Pospisil	(Belgium) Maxime Authom	7–6^{(8–6)}, 6–4
Rimouski	2011	(South Africa) Fritz Wolmarans	(United States) Bobby Reynolds	6–7^{(2–7)}, 6–3, 7–6^{(7–3)}
Rimouski	2010	(South Africa) Rik de Voest	(United States) Tim Smyczek	6–0, 7–5
Rimouski	2009	Not held		
Rimouski	2008	(United States) Ryan Sweeting	(Denmark) Kristian Pless	6–4, 7–6^{(7–3)}
Rimouski	2007	(United States) Brendan Evans	(Serbia) Ilija Bozoljac	6–7^{(3–7)}, 6–4, 6–4
Rimouski	2006	(Denmark) Kristian Pless	(Chinese Taipei) Lu Yen-hsun	6–4, 7–6^{(7–5)}

=== Doubles ===
Location	Year	Champions	Runners-up	Score
Drummondville	2026	(Mexico) Miguel Ángel Reyes-Varela (United States) Reese Stalder	(United States) Nathaniel Lammons (Australia) John-Patrick Smith	6–3, 6–7^{(4–7)}, [10–7]
Drummondville	2025	(United States) Trey Hilderbrand (United States) Mac Kiger	(Mexico) Alan Magadán (United States) Karl Poling	6–3, 6–4
Drummondville	2024	(United States) Robert Cash (United States) JJ Tracy	(Canada) Liam Draxl (Canada) Cleeve Harper	6–2, 6–4
Drummondville	2023	(Sweden) André Göransson (United Kingdom) Toby Samuel	(Canada) Liam Draxl (United Kingdom) Giles Hussey	6–7^{(2–7)}, 6–3, [10–8]
Drummondville	2022	(United Kingdom) Julian Cash (United Kingdom) Henry Patten	(United Kingdom) Arthur Fery (United Kingdom) Giles Hussey	6–3, 6–3
Drummondville	2021	Not held		
Drummondville	2020	(France) Manuel Guinard (France) Arthur Rinderknech	(Dominican Republic) Roberto Cid Subervi (Portugal) Gonçalo Oliveira	7–6^{(7–4)}, 7–6^{(7–3)}
Drummondville	2019	(United Kingdom) Scott Clayton (Canada) Adil Shamasdin	(Australia) Matt Reid (Australia) John-Patrick Smith	7–5, 3–6, [10–5]
Drummondville	2018	(Belgium) Joris De Loore (Denmark) Frederik Nielsen	(Venezuela) Luis David Martínez (Canada) Filip Peliwo	6–4, 6–3
Drummondville	2017	(Australia) Sam Groth (Canada) Adil Shamasdin	(Australia) Matt Reid (Australia) John-Patrick Smith	6–3, 2–6, [10–8]
Drummondville	2016	(United States) James Cerretani (United States) Max Schnur	(United Kingdom) Daniel Evans (United Kingdom) Lloyd Glasspool	3–6, 6–3, [11–9]
Drummondville	2015	(Canada) Philip Bester (Australia) Chris Guccione	(Canada) Frank Dancevic (Germany) Frank Moser	6–4, 7–6^{(8–6)}
Rimouski
Rimouski	2014	(United Kingdom) Edward Corrie (United Kingdom) Daniel Smethurst	(Belgium) Germain Gigounon (Belgium) Olivier Rochus	6–2, 6–1
Rimouski	2013	(Australia) Sam Groth (Australia) John-Patrick Smith	(Germany) Philipp Marx (Romania) Florin Mergea	7–6^{(7–5)}, 7–6^{(9–7)}
Rimouski	2012	(Poland) Tomasz Bednarek (France) Olivier Charroin	(Germany) Jaan-Frederik Brunken (Germany) Stefan Seifert	6–3, 6–2
Rimouski	2011	(Philippines) Treat Conrad Huey (Canada) Vasek Pospisil	(United Kingdom) David Rice (United Kingdom) Sean Thornley	6–0, 6–1
Rimouski	2010	(Australia) Kaden Hensel (Australia) Adam Hubble	(United States) Scott Lipsky (United States) David Martin	7–6^{(7–5)}, 3–6, [11–9]
Rimouski	2009	Not held		
Rimouski	2008	(Canada) Vasek Pospisil (Canada) Milos Raonic	(Denmark) Kristian Pless (Sweden) Michael Ryderstedt	5–7, 6–4, [10–6]
Rimouski	2007	(New Zealand) Daniel King-Turner (Australia) Robert Smeets	(United States) Brendan Evans (United States) Alberto Francis	7–5, 6–7^{(7–9)}, [10–7]
Rimouski	2006	(Denmark) Frederik Nielsen (Denmark) Kristian Pless	(Netherlands) Jasper Smit (Netherlands) Martijn van Haasteren	6–2, 6–4
