= Juan Carlos Spir =

Colombian tennis player

- Country (sports): Colombia
- Born: 1 May 1990 (age 36) Medellín, Colombia
- Height: 6 ft 4 in (193 cm)
- Plays: Right-handed
- College: Georgia Tech
- Prize money: $45,437

Singles
- Career record: 0–0
- Career titles: 0
- Highest ranking: No. 410 (8 September 2014)
- Current ranking: No. 426 (26 August 2014)

Doubles
- Career record: 0–1
- Highest ranking: No. 122 (4 August 2014)
- Current ranking: No. 124 (26 August 2014)
Medal record
Men's tennis
Representing Colombia
Central American and Caribbean Games
Gold medal – first place	2014 Veracruz	Men's Doubles
Gold medal – first place	2014 Veracruz	Team
- Last updated on: 10 April 2014.

Juan Carlos Spir (Spanish pronunciation: [ˈxwaŋ ˈkaɾlos (e)ˈspiɾ]; (Note: In isolation, Juan is pronounced [ˈxwan].) born 1 May 1990) is a Colombian tennis player playing on the ATP Challenger Tour. He played college tennis for the Georgia Tech Yellow Jackets and was a three-time ITA All-American (2011, 2012, 2013) and a three-time All-ACC performer.

On September 8, 2014, he reached his highest ATP singles ranking of 410 and his highest doubles ranking of 122, on August 4, 2014.

== Central American and Caribbean Games ==
=== Doubles: 1 ===
Outcome	No.	Year	Tournament	Surface	Partner	Opponent	Score
Winner	1.	2014	Veracruz, Mexico	Clay	(Colombia) Eduardo Struvay	(Mexico) Santiago González (Mexico) César Ramírez	7-5, 6–3

== Tour titles ==
Legend (singles)
Grand Slam (0)
ATP Masters Series (0)
ATP Tour (0)
Challengers (3–1)
ITF Futures (5–2)

=== Singles: 3 (1–2) ===
Outcome	No.	Date	Tournament	Surface	Opponent	Score
Runner–up	1.	7 October 2013	F13 Futures	Hard	(Japan) Naoki Nakagawa	3–6, 4–6
Winner	1.	24 November 2013	F7 Futures	Hard	(Colombia) Carlos Salamanca	4–3, Retired
Runner–up	2.	23 August 2014	F3 Futures	Clay	(El Salvador) Marcelo Arévalo	6–7^{(2–7)}, 4–6

=== Doubles: 12 (7–5) ===
Outcome	No.	Date	Tournament	Surface	Partner	Opponents	Score
Runner–up	1.	18 June 2012	F16 Futures	Clay	(United States) Kevin King	(Philippines) Ruben Gonzales (Barbados) Darian King	6–3, 3–6, [10–4]
Runner–up	2.	7 October 2013	F13 Futures	Hard	(South Africa) Dean O'Brien	(Puerto Rico) Alex Llompart (Mexico) César Ramírez	4–6, 6–3, [5–10]
Winner	3.	12 August 2013	F4 Futures	Clay	(United States) Kevin King	(Colombia) Felipe Mantilla (Colombia) Eduardo Struvay	6–3, 6–3
Winner	4.	19 August 2013	F5 Futures	Clay	(United States) Kevin King	(United States) Chase Buchanan (United States) Devin McCarthy	6–3, 7–5
Winner	5.	16 November 2013	F6 Futures	Hard	(South Africa) Dean O'Brien	(Germany) Jonas Luetjen (Colombia) Steffen Zornosa	6–4, 6–0
Runner-up	6.	23 November 2013	F7 Futures	Hard	(South Africa) Dean O'Brien	(Colombia) Felipe Mantilla (Colombia) Eduardo Struvay	7–6^{(7–5)}, 2–6, [10–7]
Winner	7.	12 January 2014	F1 Futures	Clay	(United States) Kevin King	(United States) Jean-Yves Aubone (United States) Vahid Mirzadeh	7–6^{(7–5)}, 6–3
Winner	1.	22 September 2013	Quito	Clay	(United States) Kevin King	(Guatemala) Christopher Díaz Figueroa (Colombia) Carlos Salamanca	7–5, 6–7^{(9–11)}, [11–9]
Runner-up	2.	25 January 2014	Bucaramanga	Clay	(United States) Kevin King	(Colombia) Juan Sebastián Cabal (Colombia) Robert Farah	7–6^{(7–3)}, 6–3
Winner	3.	1 February 2014	Chitré	Hard	(United States) Kevin King	(Puerto Rico) Alex Llompart (Argentina) Mateo Nicolas Martinez	7–6^{(7–5)}, 6–4
Winner	4.	20 April 2014	San Luis Potosí	Clay	(United States) Kevin King	(Spain) Adrián Menéndez Maceiras (Argentina) Agustín Velotti	6–3, 6–4
Runner–up	8.	30 August 2014	F4 Futures	Clay	(South Africa) Dean O'Brien	(Brazil) Fabiano de Paula (Chile) Nicolás Jarry	6–2, 2–6, [9–11]
Runner–up	9.	30 August 2014	F6 Futures	Clay	(United States) Kevin King	(Peru) Sergio Galdós (Argentina) Marco Trungelliti	6–7^{(5–7)}, 6–7^{(2–7)}

== See also ==
- List of Georgia Institute of Technology athletes
