= Kevin King (tennis) =

American tennis player

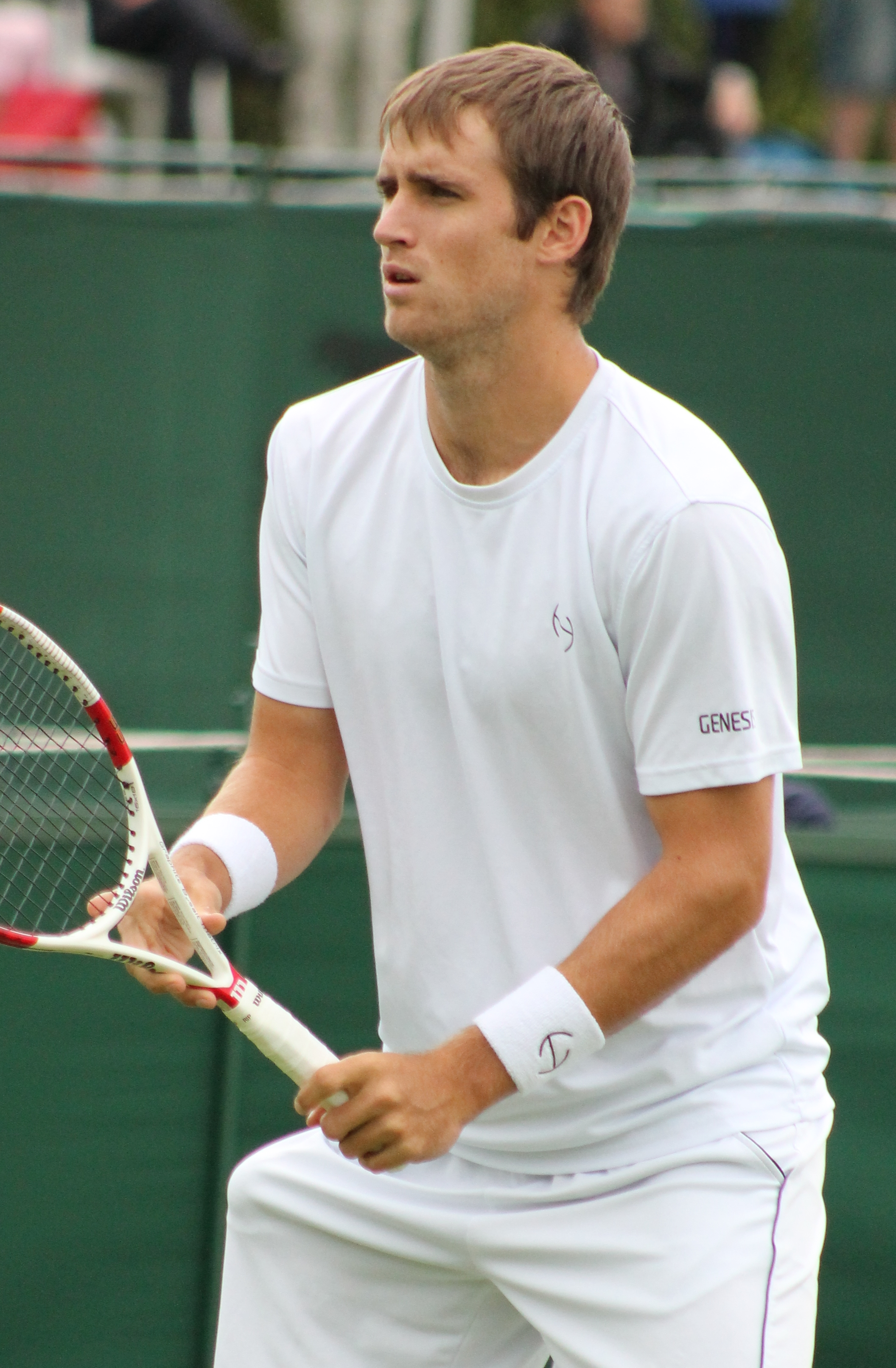
- Full name: Kevin Scott King
- Country (sports): United States
- Residence: Peachtree City, Georgia, United States
- Born: February 28, 1991 (age 34); Peachtree City, Georgia, United States
- Height: 1.90 m (6 ft 3 in)
- Turned pro: 2013
- Retired: 2021
- Plays: Left-handed (two-handed backhand)
- College: Georgia Tech
- Prize money: $315,363

Singles
- Career record: 1–6
- Career titles: 0
- Highest ranking: No. 162 (May 7, 2018)

Grand Slam singles results
- Australian Open: 1R (2018)
- French Open: Q1 (2018)
- Wimbledon: Q1 (2018)
- US Open: Q1 (2018)

Doubles
- Career record: 2–9
- Career titles: 0
- Highest ranking: No. 114 (July 28, 2014)

Grand Slam doubles results
- Wimbledon: 1R (2014)
- US Open: 1R (2014, 2018)
- Last updated on: 20 July 2024.

Kevin King (born February 28, 1991) is an American professional tennis player. He played collegiate tennis for the Georgia Tech Yellow Jackets and was a two-time ITA All-American (2011 and 2012) and a three-time All-ACC performer.

On May 7, 2018, he reached his highest ATP singles ranking of No. 162.

== Challenger and Futures/World Tennis Tour finals ==
=== Singles: 9 (6–3) ===
| Legend (singles) ATP Challenger Tour (1–0) ITF Futures Tour/World Tennis Tour (5–3) | Titles by surface Hard (5–3) Clay (1–0) Grass (0–0) |

| Result | W–L | Date | Tournament | Tier | Surface | Opponent | Score |
|---|---|---|---|---|---|---|---|
| Win | 1–0 | May 2014 | Mexico F2, Córdoba | Futures | Hard | (United States) Adam El Mihdawy | 6–2, 7–5 |
| Win | 2–0 | May 2014 | Mexico F3, Mexico City | Futures | Hard | (Guatemala) Christopher Díaz Figueroa | 6–1, 6–2 |
| Loss | 2–1 | Aug 2015 | USA F24, Decatur | Futures | Hard | (Australia) Luke Saville | 4–6, 4–6 |
| Win | 3–1 | Aug 2015 | USA F25, Champaign | Futures | Hard | (United Kingdom) Richard Gabb | 6–3, 6–1 |
| Win | 4–1 | May 2017 | Mexico F2, Villahermosa | Futures | Hard (i) | (Ecuador) Iván Endara | 7–5, 7–5 |
| Loss | 4–2 | Jun 2017 | USA F17, Winston-Salem | Futures | Hard | (United States) Christopher Eubanks | 5–7, 6–2, 6–7^{(6–8)} |
| Win | 5–2 | Sep 2017 | Canada F6, Toronto | Futures | Clay | (Dominican Republic) Roberto Cid Subervi | 6–1, 6–2 |
| Win | 6–2 | Sep 2017 | Cary, USA | Challenger | Hard | (United Kingdom) Cameron Norrie | 6–4, 6–1 |
| Loss | 6–3 | Jun 2019 | M25 Martos, Spain | World Tennis Tour | Hard | (Colombia) Eduardo Struvay | 3–6, 2–6 |

=== Doubles: 25 (11–14) ===
| Legend (doubles) ATP Challenger Tour (3–3) ITF Futures Tour (8–11) | Titles by surface Hard (6–10) Clay (5–4) Grass (0–0) |

| Result | W–L | Date | Tournament | Tier | Surface | Partner | Opponents | Score |
|---|---|---|---|---|---|---|---|---|
| Loss | 0–1 | Jun 2012 | USA F16, Indian Harbour Beach | Futures | Clay | (Colombia) Juan Carlos Spir | (Philippines) Ruben Gonzales (Barbados) Darian King | 2–6, 6–3, [4–10] |
| Loss | 0–2 | Feb 2013 | USA F4, Palm Coast | Futures | Clay | (United States) Vahid Mirzadeh | (United States) Jean-Yves Aubone (United States) Joey B. Burkhardt | 4–6, 3–6 |
| Loss | 0–3 | Mar 2013 | USA F6, Harlingen | Futures | Hard | (South Africa) Dean O'Brien | (Philippines) Ruben Gonzales (Australia) Chris Letcher | 2–6, 3–6 |
| Win | 1–3 | Aug 2013 | Colombia F4, Bogotá | Futures | Clay | (Colombia) Juan Carlos Spir | (Colombia) Felipe Mantilla (Colombia) Eduardo Struvay | 6–3, 6–3 |
| Win | 2–3 | Aug 2013 | Colombia F5, Manizales | Futures | Clay | (Colombia) Juan Carlos Spir | (United States) Chase Buchanan (United States) Devin McCarthy | 6–3, 7–5 |
| Win | 3–3 | Sep 2013 | Quito, Ecuador | Challenger | Clay | (Colombia) Juan Carlos Spir | (Guatemala) Christopher Díaz Figueroa (Colombia) Carlos Salamanca | 7–5, 6–7^{(9–11)}, [11–9] |
| Loss | 3–4 | Oct 2013 | USA F27, Mansfield | Futures | Hard | (United States) Jean-Yves Aubone | (United Kingdom) Edward Corrie (United Kingdom) Daniel Smethurst | 3–6, 5–7 |
| Win | 4–4 | Jan 2014 | USA F1, Plantation | Futures | Clay | (Colombia) Juan Carlos Spir | (United States) Jean-Yves Aubone (United States) Vahid Mirzadeh | 7–6^{(7–5)}, 6–3 |
| Loss | 4–5 | Jan 2014 | Bucaramanga, Colombia | Challenger | Clay | (Colombia) Juan Carlos Spir | (Colombia) Juan Sebastián Cabal (Colombia) Robert Farah | 6–7^{(3–7)}, 3–6 |
| Win | 5–5 | Feb 2014 | Chitré, Panama | Challenger | Hard | (Colombia) Juan Carlos Spir | (Puerto Rico) Alex Llompart (Argentina) Mateo Nicolas Martinez | 7–6^{(7–5)}, 6–4 |
| Win | 6–5 | Apr 2014 | San Luis Potosí, Mexico | Challenger | Clay | (Colombia) Juan Carlos Spir | (Spain) Adrián Menéndez Maceiras (Argentina) Agustín Velotti | 6–3, 6–4 |
| Loss | 6–6 | Apr 2014 | Mexico F1, Querétaro | Futures | Hard | (South Africa) Dean O'Brien | (Mexico) César Ramírez (Mexico) Miguel Ángel Reyes-Varela | 3–6, 5–7 |
| Loss | 6–7 | May 2014 | Mexico F2, Córdoba | Futures | Hard | (South Africa) Dean O'Brien | (Mexico) César Ramírez (Mexico) Miguel Ángel Reyes-Varela | 6–7^{(1–7)}, 1–6 |
| Win | 7–7 | May 2014 | Mexico F3, Mexico City | Futures | Hard | (South Africa) Dean O'Brien | (Puerto Rico) Alex Llompart (Argentina) Mateo Nicolas Martinez | 6–3, 6–4 |
| Loss | 7–8 | Sep 2014 | Ecuador F6, Ibarra | Futures | Clay | (Colombia) Juan Carlos Spir | (Peru) Sergio Galdós (Argentina) Marco Trungelliti | 6–7^{(5–7)}, 6–7^{(2–7)} |
| Loss | 7–9 | Jan 2015 | France F2, Bressuire | Futures | Hard (i) | (United Kingdom) David Rice | (France) Fabrice Martin (India) Purav Raja | 3–6, 2–6 |
| Loss | 7–10 | Mar 2015 | Canada F1, Gatineau | Futures | Hard (i) | (South Africa) Dean O'Brien | (Belgium) Germain Gigounon (United Kingdom) Daniel Smethurst | 4–6, 4–6 |
| Win | 8–10 | Mar 2015 | Canada F2, Sherbrooke | Futures | Hard (i) | (South Africa) Dean O'Brien | (United Kingdom) Edward Corrie (United Kingdom) Daniel Smethurst | 6–4, 2–6, [10–5] |
| Win | 9–10 | Aug 2015 | USA F24, Decatur | Futures | Hard | (United States) Evan King | (France) Grégoire Barrère (France) Tom Jomby | 6–0, 6–2 |
| Loss | 9–11 | Aug 2015 | USA F25, Champaign | Futures | Hard | (United States) Evan King | (United States) Justin S. Shane (United States) Ryan Shane | 1–6, 6–7^{(4–7)} |
| Loss | 9–12 | Feb 2017 | Cuernavaca, Mexico | Challenger | Hard | (South Africa) Dean O'Brien | (United States) Austin Krajicek (United States) Jackson Withrow | 7–6^{(7–4)}, 6–7^{(5–7)}, [9–11] |
| Win | 10–12 | May 2017 | Mexico F2, Villahermosa | Futures | Hard | (South Africa) Nicolaas Scholtz | (United Kingdom) Farris Fathi Gosea (United States) Nathaniel Lammons | 7–6^{(7–4)}, 7–6^{(7–4)} |
| Loss | 10–13 | Jun 2017 | USA F17, Winston-Salem | Futures | Hard | (United States) Christopher Eubanks | (United States) Brandon Holt (United States) Riley Smith | 6–7^{(4–7)}, 3–6 |
| Win | 11–13 | Jun 2017 | USA F19, Winston-Salem | Futures | Hard | (United States) Christopher Eubanks | (Germany) Dominik Köpfer (Venezuela) Luis David Martínez | 6–3, 6–4 |
| Loss | 11–14 | Jul 2017 | Winnetka, USA | Challenger | Hard | (United States) Bradley Klahn | (Thailand) Sanchai Ratiwatana (Indonesia) Christopher Rungkat | 6–7^{(4–7)}, 2–6 |

== Personal life ==
Kevin King is the son of Bill and Nuala King. He comes from a family of athletes – his father played football at Villanova and his sister, Lara, played tennis at Saint Leo University. Kevin graduated with honors from Georgia Tech with a degree in mechanical engineering.

In 2019, Kevin married Caroline Price, a fellow tennis player, who played collegiate tennis for North Carolina. Caroline is the daughter of former professional basketball player, Mark Price.

== See also ==
- List of Georgia Institute of Technology athletes
