= Maxime Authom =

Belgian tennis player (born 1987)

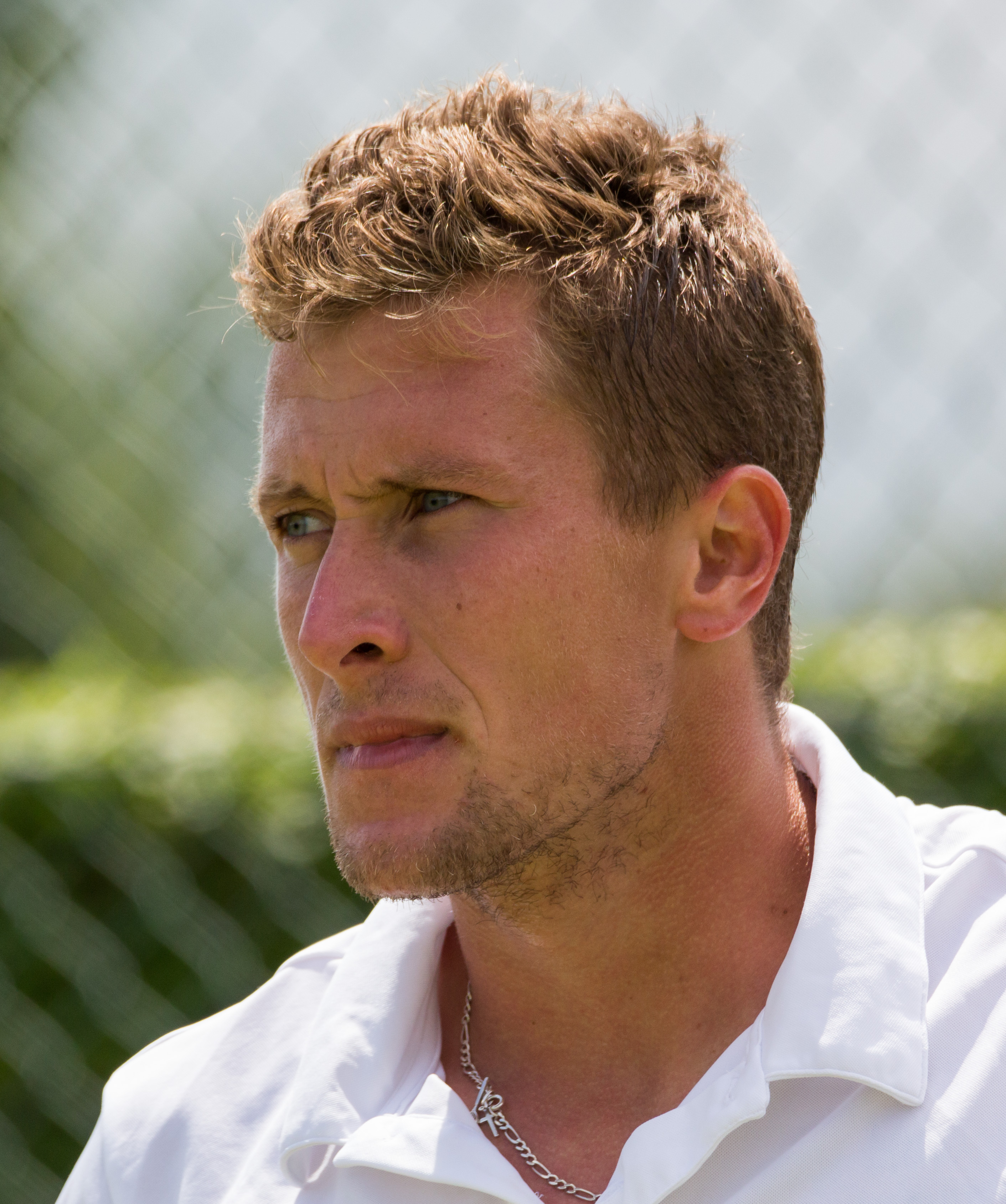
- Country (sports): Belgium
- Residence: La Louvière, Belgium
- Born: 29 March 1987 (age 38) La Louvière, Belgium
- Turned pro: 2005
- Plays: Right-handed (two-handed backhand)
- Prize money: US$352,630

Singles
- Career record: 0–2
- Career titles: 0
- Highest ranking: No. 143 (04 February 2013)

Grand Slam singles results
- Australian Open: 1R (2013)
- French Open: Q2 (2012, 2014, 2015)
- Wimbledon: Q3 (2012)
- US Open: 1R (2012)

Doubles
- Career record: 0–0
- Career titles: 0
- Highest ranking: No. 232 (18 March 2013)

Maxime Authom (born 29 March 1987) is a Belgian tennis player playing on the ATP Challenger Tour.

== Career ==
On 2 April 2012, he reached his highest ATP singles ranking of 184, after reaching his first ATP Challenger final in Rimouski, Canada. He is coached by Pim Van Mele. He won 7 single titles and 3 double titles in Futures tournaments.

In 2023, Authom was banned from professional tennis for three years and 9 months and fined $30,000 ($21,000 suspended) by the International Tennis Integrity Agency for six match fixing offences.

== Challenger finals ==
=== Singles: 0 (0–1) ===
Legend
ATP Challenger Tour (1–1)

Outcome	No.	Date	Tournament	Surface	Opponent	Score
Runner-up	1.	19 March 2012	Rimouski, Canada	Hard	(Canada) Vasek Pospisil	6–7^{(6–8)}, 4–6
