= 2011 Copa Claro – Doubles =

Doubles
- 2011 Copa Claro

Final
- Champions: (Austria) Oliver Marach (Argentina) Leonardo Mayer
- Runners-up: (Brazil) Franco Ferreiro (Brazil) André Sá
- Score: 7–6(6), 6–3

Events
Singles	Doubles
← 2010 ·	Copa Claro	· 2012 →

The 2011 Copa Claro Doubles was a men's tennis tournament played on outdoor clay courts in Copa Claro, Argentina.

Sebastián Prieto and Horacio Zeballos were the defending champions but decided not to participate.
Oliver Marach and Leonardo Mayer defeated Franco Ferreiro and André Sá 7–6(6), 6–3 in the final.

== Seeds ==
1. (Italy) Daniele Bracciali / (Italy) Potito Starace (quarterfinals)
2. (Spain) Nicolás Almagro / (Argentina) Juan Ignacio Chela (quarterfinals)
3. (Uruguay) Pablo Cuevas / (Spain) David Marrero (semifinals)
4. (Czech Republic) František Čermák / (Czech Republic) Leoš Friedl (first round)

== Draw ==
=== Key ===
- Q = Qualifier
- WC = Wild card
- LL = Lucky loser
- Alt = Alternate
- SE = Special exempt
- PR = Protected ranking
- ITF = ITF entry
- JE = Junior exempt
- w/o = Walkover
- r = Retired
- d = Defaulted
- SR = Special ranking

=== Draw ===
First round
1	(Italy) D Bracciali (Italy) P Starace	6	5	[10]
WC	(Argentina) F Argüello (Argentina) JP Brzezicki	2	7	[8]
(Spain) D Muñoz-De La Nava (Brazil) J Souza	6	1	[7]
(Brazil) F Ferreiro (Brazil) A Sá	2	6	[10]
3	(Uruguay) P Cuevas (Spain) D Marrero	1	7	[10]
(Argentina) C Berlocq (Argentina) E Schwank	6	6^{0}	[5]
WC	(Argentina) F Bagnis (Argentina) A Molteni	2	4
(Italy) F Fognini (Italy) F Volandri	6	6
(Russia) I Andreev (Ukraine) A Dolgopolov	2	6	[10]
(Spain) P Andújar (Spain) D Gimeno-Traver	6	3	[4]
(Argentina) M González (Australia) P Luczak	6	4	[10]
4	(Czech Republic) F Čermák (Czech Republic) L Friedl	4	6	[6]
(Portugal) R Machado (Spain) A Ramos-Viñolas	0	0
(Austria) O Marach (Argentina) L Mayer	6	6
(Spain) A Montañés (Spain) R Ramírez Hidalgo	2	7	[4]
2	(Spain) N Almagro (Argentina) JI Chela	6	5	[10]

Quarterfinals
1	(Italy) D Bracciali (Italy) P Starace	4	4
(Brazil) F Ferreiro (Brazil) A Sá	6	6
3	(Uruguay) P Cuevas (Spain) D Marrero	6	6
(Italy) F Fognini (Italy) F Volandri	1	2
(Russia) I Andreev (Ukraine) A Dolgopolov	6	4	[10]
(Argentina) M González (Australia) P Luczak	0	6	[3]
(Austria) O Marach (Argentina) L Mayer	6	5	[10]
2	(Spain) N Almagro (Argentina) JI Chela	3	7	[6]

Semifinals
(Brazil) F Ferreiro (Brazil) A Sá	7	6
3	(Uruguay) P Cuevas (Spain) D Marrero	5	2
(Russia) I Andreev (Ukraine) A Dolgopolov	2	1
(Austria) O Marach (Argentina) L Mayer	6	6

Final
(Brazil) F Ferreiro (Brazil) A Sá	6^{6}	3
(Austria) O Marach (Argentina) L Mayer	7	6
