= 2010 Copa Telmex =

- Date: 15–21 February
- Edition: 13th
- Category: ATP World Tour 250 series
- Draw: 32S / 16D
- Prize money: $475,300
- Surface: Clay / outdoor
- Location: Buenos Aires, Argentina

Champions

Singles
- (Spain) Juan Carlos Ferrero

Doubles
- (Argentina) Sebastián Prieto / (Argentina) Horacio Zeballos
← 2009 ·	ATP Buenos Aires	· 2011 →

The 2010 Copa Telmex was a men's tennis tournament played on outdoor clay courts. It was the 13th edition of the Copa Telmex, and was part of the ATP World Tour 250 series of the 2010 ATP World Tour. It took place in Buenos Aires, Argentina, from February 15 through February 21, 2010. Juan Carlos Ferrero won the singles title.

The singles line up was led by 2007 Copa Telmex champion and 2009 Copa Telmex runner-up Juan Mónaco, David Ferrer, Nicolás Almagro and Juan Carlos Ferrero. other players were 2008 champion David Nalbandian, Richard Gasquet, Igor Andreev, Albert Montañés.

== Finals ==
=== Singles ===
(Spain) Juan Carlos Ferrero defeated (Spain) David Ferrer 5–7, 6–4, 6–3

- It was Ferrero's 2nd title of the year and 14th of his career.

=== Doubles ===
(Argentina) Sebastián Prieto / (Argentina) Horacio Zeballos defeated (Germany) Simon Greul / (Australia) Peter Luczak, 7–6^{(7–4)}, 6–3

== Entrants ==
=== Seeds ===
Athlete	Nationality	Ranking*	Seeding
David Ferrer	Spain	17	1
Juan Carlos Ferrero	Spain	22	2
Nicolás Almagro	Spain	26	3
Juan Mónaco	Argentina	27	4
Albert Montañés	Spain	30	5
Igor Andreev	Russia	41	6
Victor Hănescu	Romania	44	7
Horacio Zeballos	Argentina	49	8

- Rankings as of February 8, 2010.

=== Other entrants ===
The following players received wildcards into the main draw:

- (Argentina) Gastón Gaudio
- (Spain) Carlos Moyá
- (Argentina) Eduardo Schwank

The following players received entry from the qualifying draw:

- (Spain) Pablo Andújar
- (Argentina) Diego Junqueira
- (Spain) Santiago Ventura
- (Italy) Filippo Volandri

The following players received Special Exempts into the main draw:

- (Poland) Łukasz Kubot
- (Brazil) Ricardo Mello
