= 2010 Copa Telmex – Doubles =

Doubles
- 2010 Copa Telmex

Final
- Champions: (Argentina) Sebastián Prieto (Argentina) Horacio Zeballos
- Runners-up: (Germany) Simon Greul (Australia) Peter Luczak
- Score: 7–6^{(7–4)}, 6–3

Events
| Singles | Doubles |
| ← 2009 · | Copa Telmex | · 2011 → |

Marcel Granollers and Alberto Martín were the defending champions, but Martín chose to not participate.
Granollers decided to participate with Pablo Cuevas, but they lost in the quarterfinals against Simon Greul and Peter Luczak.
Sebastián Prieto and Horacio Zeballos defeated 7–6^{(7–4)}, 6–3 Greul and Luczak in the final.

== Seeds ==
1. (Uruguay) Pablo Cuevas / (Spain) Marcel Granollers (quarterfinals)
2. (Brazil) André Sá / (Romania) Horia Tecău (first round)
3. (Czech Republic) Leoš Friedl / (Czech Republic) David Škoch (first round)
4. (Argentina) Sebastián Prieto / (Argentina) Horacio Zeballos (champions)

== Draw ==
=== Key ===
- Q = Qualifier
- WC = Wild card
- LL = Lucky loser
- Alt = Alternate
- SE = Special exempt
- PR = Protected ranking
- ITF = ITF entry
- JE = Junior exempt
- w/o = Walkover
- r = Retired
- d = Defaulted
- SR = Special ranking

=== Draws ===
First round
1 | (Uruguay) P Cuevas (Spain) M Granollers | 5 | 6 | [10]
(France) R Gasquet (Argentina) M Vassallo Argüello | 7 | 4 | [4]
(Portugal) F Gil (Argentina) E Schwank | 4 | 1
(Germany) S Greul (Australia) P Luczak | 6 | 6
3 | (Czech Republic) L Friedl (Czech Republic) D Škoch | 7 | 2 | [6]
(Spain) D Ferrer (Spain) R Ramírez Hidalgo | 5 | 6 | [10]
WC | (Argentina) JP Brzezicki (Argentina) JI Chela | 4 | 4
(Russia) I Andreev (Spain) D Gimeno-Traver | 6 | 6
(Spain) Ó Hernández (Spain) A Montañés | 3 | 6 | [3]
WC | (Argentina) L Arnold Ker (Argentina) B Dabul | 6 | 3 | [10]
(Brazil) M Daniel (Italy) P Lorenzi | 6^{4} | 0
4 | (Argentina) S Prieto (Argentina) H Zeballos | 7^{7} | 6
(Spain) N Almagro (Spain) S Ventura | 5 | 6 | [10]
(Italy) F Fognini (Italy) P Starace | 7 | 2 | [3]
(Austria) D Köllerer (Austria) O Marach | 6 | 6
2 | (Brazil) A Sá (Romania) H Tecău | 1 | 4

Quarterfinals
1 | (Uruguay) P Cuevas (Spain) M Granollers | 3 | 4
(Germany) S Greul (Australia) P Luczak | 6 | 6
(Spain) D Ferrer (Spain) R Ramírez Hidalgo | 6 | 7
(Russia) I Andreev (Spain) D Gimeno-Traver | 2 | 5
WC | (Argentina) L Arnold Ker (Argentina) B Dabul | 6 | 4 | [6]
4 | (Argentina) S Prieto (Argentina) H Zeballos | 2 | 6 | [10]
(Spain) N Almagro (Spain) S Ventura | 5 | 6 | [10]
(Austria) D Köllerer (Austria) O Marach | 7 | 1 | [7]

Semifinals
(Germany) S Greul (Australia) P Luczak | w/o
(Spain) D Ferrer (Spain) R Ramírez Hidalgo
4 | (Argentina) S Prieto (Argentina) H Zeballos | 6 | 7^{7}
(Spain) N Almagro (Spain) S Ventura | 1 | 6^{5}

Final
(Germany) S Greul (Australia) P Luczak | 6^{4} | 3
4 | (Argentina) S Prieto (Argentina) H Zeballos | 7^{7} | 6
