= 2008 Copa Telmex – Singles =

Singles
- 2008 Copa Telmex

Final
- Champion: (Argentina) David Nalbandian
- Runner-up: (Argentina) José Acasuso
- Score: 3–6, 7–6^{(7–5)}, 6–4

Details
- Draw: 32
- Seeds: 8

Events
Singles	Doubles
← 2007 ·	Copa Telmex	· 2009 →

Juan Mónaco was the defending champion, but lost in the first round to Agustín Calleri.

David Nalbandian won in the final 3–6, 7–6^{(7–5)}, 6–4, against José Acasuso. This was until 2021 the last time a tennis player from Argentina won the singles tournament, and it was also the last all-argentine final until 2021.

== Seeds ==
1. (Argentina) David Nalbandian (champion)
2. (Argentina) Juan Mónaco (first round)
3. (Spain) Carlos Moyá (first round)
4. (Argentina) Juan Ignacio Chela (semifinals)
5. (Spain) Nicolás Almagro (quarterfinals, retired due to a groin injury)
6. (Russia) Igor Andreev (quarterfinals)
7. (Italy) Potito Starace (quarterfinals)
8. (Italy) Filippo Volandri (semifinals)

== Draw ==
=== Key ===
- Q = Qualifier
- WC = Wild card
- LL = Lucky loser
- Alt = Alternate
- SE = Special exempt
- PR = Protected ranking
- ITF = ITF entry
- JE = Junior exempt
- w/o = Walkover
- r = Retired
- d = Defaulted
- SR = Special ranking

=== Finals ===
Semifinals
1	(Argentina) David Nalbandian	6	6
4	(Argentina) Juan Ignacio Chela	1	2
(Argentina) José Acasuso	4	6	6
8	(Italy) Filippo Volandri	6	4	4

Final
1	(Argentina) David Nalbandian	3	7^{7}	6
(Argentina) José Acasuso	6	6^{5}	4

=== Top half ===
First round
1	(Argentina) D Nalbandian	6	6
(Australia) P Luczak	3	3
(Italy) F Fognini	6	6
WC	(Argentina) E Schwank	2	1
SE	(Ecuador) N Lapentti	3	2
(Argentina) JP Brzezicki	6	6
(Serbia) B Pašanski	1	6	4
7	(Italy) P Starace	6	3	6
4	(Argentina) JI Chela	5	6	6
(Spain) S Ventura	7	3	2
(Austria) W Eschauer	4	4
Q	(Brazil) T Bellucci	6	6
(Spain) Ó Hernández	6	6
LL	(France) É Prodon	4	3
(Argentina) M Vassallo Argüello	6^{5}	6^{2}
5	(Spain) N Almagro	7^{7}	7^{7}

Second round
1	(Argentina) D Nalbandian	7^{7}	4	6
(Italy) F Fognini	6^{5}	6	3
(Argentina) JP Brzezicki	3	3
7	(Italy) P Starace	6	6
4	(Argentina) JI Chela	6	6
Q	(Brazil) T Bellucci	4	4
(Spain) Ó Hernández	2	6	3
5	(Spain) N Almagro	6	2	6

Quarterfinals
1	(Argentina) D Nalbandian	4	7^{7}	6
7	(Italy) P Starace	6	6^{5}	4
4	(Argentina) JI Chela	6	2
5	(Spain) N Almagro	3	1^{r}

Semifinals
1	(Argentina) D Nalbandian	6	6
4	(Argentina) JI Chela	1	2

=== Bottom half ===
First round
6	(Russia) I Andreev	6	6^{8}	7^{7}
(Spain) Montañés	3	7^{10}	6^{4}
(Argentina) C Berlocq	4	5
(Czech Republic) J Vaněk	6	7
Q	(Spain) D Gimeno Traver	2	6	6
Q	(Spain) R Ramírez Hidalgo	6	1	2
(Argentina) J Acasuso	6	6
3	(Spain) C Moyá	2	4
8	(Italy) F Volandri	6	6
(Chile) N Massú	4	2
(Argentina) S Roitman	4
Q	(Czech Republic) I Minář	0^{r}
WC	(Argentina) M González	4	4
(Peru) L Horna	6	6
(Argentina) A Calleri	6	2	6
2	(Argentina) J Mónaco	4	6	3

Second round
6	(Russia) I Andreev	6	0	6
(Czech Republic) J Vaněk	1	6	4
Q	(Spain) D Gimeno Traver	3	4
(Argentina) J Acasuso	6	6
8	(Italy) F Volandri	7	7
(Argentina) S Roitman	5	5
(Peru) L Horna	6	2	2
(Argentina) A Calleri	3	6	6

Quarterfinals
6	(Russia) I Andreev	6	1	3
(Argentina) J Acasuso	3	6	6
8	(Italy) F Volandri	6	6
(Argentina) A Calleri	4	4

Semifinals
(Argentina) J Acasuso	4	6	6
8	(Italy) F Volandri	6	4	4
