= 2010 Copa Telmex – Singles =

Singles
- 2010 Copa Telmex

Final
- Champion: (Spain) Juan Carlos Ferrero
- Runner-up: (Spain) David Ferrer
- Score: 5–7, 6–4, 6–3

Events
Singles	Doubles
← 2009 ·	Copa Telmex	· 2011 →

Tommy Robredo was the defending champion, but chose to compete in Marseille instead.

Juan Carlos Ferrero won in the final against David Ferrer 5–7, 6–4, 6–3.

== Seeds ==
1. (Spain) David Ferrer (final)
2. (Spain) Juan Carlos Ferrero (champion)
3. (Spain) Nicolás Almagro (first round)
4. (Argentina) Juan Mónaco (semifinals)
5. (Spain) Albert Montañés (semifinals)
6. (Russia) Igor Andreev (quarterfinals)
7. (Romania) Victor Hănescu (second round)
8. (Argentina) Horacio Zeballos (quarterfinals)

== Draw ==
=== Key ===
- Q = Qualifier
- WC = Wild card
- LL = Lucky loser
- Alt = Alternate
- SE = Special exempt
- PR = Protected ranking
- ITF = ITF entry
- JE = Junior exempt
- w/o = Walkover
- r = Retired
- d = Defaulted
- SR = Special ranking

=== Finals ===
Semifinals
1	(Spain) David Ferrer	6	6
5	(Spain) Albert Montañés	1	1
4	(Argentina) Juan Mónaco	2	6^{7}
2	(Spain) Juan Carlos Ferrero	6	7^{9}

Final
1	(Spain) David Ferrer	7	4	3
2	(Spain) Juan Carlos Ferrero	5	6	6

=== Top half ===
First round
1	(Spain) D Ferrer	6	7^{7}
(Germany) S Greul	2	6^{3}
(Australia) P Luczak	2	4
(Portugal) F Gil	6	6
(Spain) M Granollers	6	6
Q	(Argentina) D Junqueira	1	2
(Italy) F Fognini	5	6^{4}
6	(Russia) I Andreev	7	7^{7}
5	(Spain) A Montañés	6	6
(Uruguay) P Cuevas	2	2
Q	(Spain) P Andújar	6	6
(Spain) Ó Hernández	4	1
(Italy) P Starace	2	6^{2}
(Argentina) D Nalbandian	6	7^{7}
(Spain) D Gimeno-Traver	6^{4}	7^{8}	6
3	(Spain) N Almagro	7^{7}	6^{6}	3

Second round
1	(Spain) D Ferrer	6	6
(Portugal) F Gil	3	0
(Spain) M Granollers	6	3	4
6	(Russia) I Andreev	3	6	6
5	(Spain) A Montañés	6	6
Q	(Spain) P Andújar	3	2
(Argentina) D Nalbandian	6^{5}	6	7^{9}
(Spain) D Gimeno-Traver	7^{7}	4	6^{7}

Quarterfinals
1	(Spain) D Ferrer	7	6
6	(Russia) I Andreev	5	2
5	(Spain) A Montañés	w/o
(Argentina) D Nalbandian

Semifinals
1	(Spain) D Ferrer	6	6
5	(Spain) A Montañés	1	1

=== Bottom half ===
First round
4	(Argentina) J Mónaco	6	7^{7}
SE	(Poland) Ł Kubot	4	6^{1}
(Argentina) JI Chela	7^{7}	7
(France) R Gasquet	6^{3}	5
WC	(Spain) C Moyá	6	7
Q	(Italy) F Volandri	2	5
WC	(Argentina) G Gaudio	3	6	3
8	(Argentina) H Zeballos	6	3	6
7	(Romania) V Hănescu	6	7
WC	(Argentina) E Schwank	3	5
(Austria) D Köllerer	4	2
Q	(Spain) S Ventura	6	6
(Italy) P Lorenzi	1	3
(Brazil) M Daniel	6	6
SE	(Brazil) R Mello	1	2
2	(Spain) JC Ferrero	6	6

Second round
4	(Argentina) J Mónaco	7^{7}	4	6
(Argentina) JI Chela	6^{3}	6	2
WC	(Spain) C Moyá	4	4
8	(Argentina) H Zeballos	6	6
7	(Romania) V Hănescu	4	6^{10}
Q	(Spain) S Ventura	6	7^{12}
(Brazil) M Daniel	2	4
2	(Spain) JC Ferrero	6	6

Quarterfinals
4	(Argentina) J Mónaco	7	6
8	(Argentina) H Zeballos	5	1
Q	(Spain) S Ventura	3	6	2
2	(Spain) JC Ferrero	6	3	6

Semifinals
4	(Argentina) J Mónaco	2	6^{7}
2	(Spain) JC Ferrero	6	7^{9}

== Qualifying ==
=== Seeds ===
1. (Chile) Nicolás Massú (first round)
2. (Argentina) Martín Vassallo Argüello (first round)
3. (Spain) Santiago Ventura Bertomeu (qualified)
4. (Spain) Alberto Martín (qualifying competition)
5. (Romania) Victor Crivoi (first round)
6. (Spain) Rubén Ramírez Hidalgo (second round)
7. (Brazil) João Souza (second round)
8. (Brazil) Julio Silva (second round)

=== Qualifiers ===
1. (Italy) Filippo Volandri
2. (Argentina) Diego Junqueira
3. (Spain) Santiago Ventura Bertomeu
4. (Spain) Pablo Andújar

=== Draw ===
==== First qualifier ====
First round
1	(Chile) Nicolás Massú	2	3
(Italy) Filippo Volandri	6	6
(Argentina) Andres Dellatorre	4	1
(Italy) Flavio Cipolla	6	6
(Argentina) Carlos Berlocq	6	3	6^{3}
WC	(Argentina) Facundo Bagnis	4	6	7^{7}
(Canada) Peter Polansky	4	6	6^{6}
6	(Spain) Rubén Ramírez Hidalgo	6	3	7^{8}

Second round
(Italy) Filippo Volandri	4	6	6
(Italy) Flavio Cipolla	6	0	4
WC	(Argentina) Facundo Bagnis	7	6
6	(Spain) Rubén Ramírez Hidalgo	5	2

Qualifying competition
(Italy) Filippo Volandri	6	6
WC	(Argentina) Facundo Bagnis	3	0

==== Second qualifier ====
First round
2	(Argentina) Martín Vassallo Argüello	3	3
(Argentina) Federico Delbonis	6	6
WC	(Argentina) Facundo Argüello	1	1
(Argentina) Juan Pablo Brzezicki	6	6
(Brazil) Caio Zampieri	1	1
(Argentina) Diego Junqueira	6	6
(Argentina) Juan-Martín Aranguren	6	5	6^{7}
8	(Brazil) Júlio Silva	1	7	7^{9}

Second round
(Argentina) Federico Delbonis	0	1
(Argentina) Juan Pablo Brzezicki	6	6
(Argentina) Diego Junqueira	6	6
8	(Brazil) Júlio Silva	4	0

Qualifying competition
(Argentina) Juan Pablo Brzezicki	2	4
(Argentina) Diego Junqueira	6	6

==== Third qualifier ====
First round
3	(Spain) Santiago Ventura Bertomeu	3	6	7^{11}
(Argentina) Brian Dabul	6	3	6^{9}
WC	(Argentina) Agustín Velotti	7^{7}	1	7^{7}
(Portugal) Leonardo Tavares	6^{5}	6	6^{5}
(Brazil) Ricardo Hocevar	7^{11}	6
(Argentina) Sebastián Decoud	6^{9}	4
WC	(Argentina) Guido Pella	6	4	3
7	(Brazil) João Souza	3	6	6

Second round
3	(Spain) Santiago Ventura Bertomeu	6	6
WC	(Argentina) Agustín Velotti	2	4
(Brazil) Ricardo Hocevar	6^{3}	6	6
7	(Brazil) João Souza	7^{7}	4	4

Qualifying competition
3	(Spain) Santiago Ventura Bertomeu	3	6	6
(Brazil) Ricardo Hocevar	6	4	1

==== Fourth qualifier ====
First round
4	(Spain) Alberto Martín	7^{7}	6
(Uruguay) Marcel Felder	6^{1}	4
(Romania) Adrian Ungur	6	6
(Chile) Jorge Aguilar	4	3
(Argentina) Juan-Pablo Amado	6	6
(Argentina) Leandro Migani	4	2
(Spain) Pablo Andújar	6^{5}	7	6
5	(Romania) Victor Crivoi	7^{7}	5	4

Second round
4	(Spain) Alberto Martín	6	6
(Romania) Adrian Ungur	4	4
(Argentina) Juan-Pablo Amado	2	3
(Spain) Pablo Andújar	6	6

Qualifying competition
4	(Spain) Alberto Martín	3	1
(Spain) Pablo Andújar	6	6
