= 2009 Copa Telmex – Doubles =

Doubles
- 2009 Copa Telmex

Final
- Champions: (Spain) Marcel Granollers; (Spain) Alberto Martín
- Runners-up: (Spain) Nicolás Almagro; (Spain) Santiago Ventura
- Score: 6–3, 5–7, [10–8]

Events
Singles	Doubles
← 2008 ·	Copa Telmex	· 2010 →

Agustín Calleri and Luis Horna were the defending champions of the 2008 Copa Telmex men's doubles tennis tournament, but did not play together that year.

Agustín Calleri partnered with Potito Starace, but lost in the semifinals to Marcel Granollers and Alberto Martín.

Luis Horna chose not to participate that year.

== Seeds ==
1. (Czech Republic) František Čermák / (Slovakia) Michal Mertiňák (first round)
2. (Poland) Łukasz Kubot / (Austria) Oliver Marach (first round)
3. (Uruguay) Pablo Cuevas / (Argentina) Máximo González (first round)
4. (Argentina) Lucas Arnold Ker / (Argentina) Juan Mónaco (first round)

== Draw ==
=== Key ===
- Q = Qualifier
- WC = Wild card
- LL = Lucky loser
- Alt = Alternate
- SE = Special exempt
- PR = Protected ranking
- ITF = ITF entry
- JE = Junior exempt
- w/o = Walkover
- r = Retired
- d = Defaulted
- SR = Special ranking

=== Draw ===
First round

Quarterfinals

Semifinals

Final

1
- (Czech Republic) F Čermák
- (Slovakia) M Mertiňák
7^{7}
3
[5]

- (Spain) D Gimeno Traver
- (Spain) I Navarro
6^{2}
6
[10]

- (Spain) D Gimeno Traver
- (Spain) I Navarro
1
6^{4}

- (Argentina) A Calleri
- (Italy) P Starace
6
7

- (Argentina) A Calleri
- (Italy) P Starace
6
7^{7}

- (France) N Devilder
- (Argentina) D Junqueira
1
5

- (Argentina) A Calleri
- (Italy) P Starace
1
6
[5]

4
- (Argentina) L Arnold Ker
- (Argentina) J Mónaco
2
5

- (Spain) M Granollers
- (Spain) A Martín
6
1
[10]

WC
- (Argentina) E Schwank
- (Argentina) H Zeballos
6
7

WC
- (Argentina) E Schwank
- (Argentina) H Zeballos
1
1

- (Austria) D Köllerer
- (Chile) N Massú
3
4

- (Spain) M Granollers
- (Spain) A Martín
6
6

- (Spain) M Granollers
- (Spain) A Martín
6
6

- (Spain) M Granollers
- (Spain) A Martín
6
5
[10]

- (Spain) N Almagro
- (Spain) S Ventura
6
6

- (Spain) N Almagro
- (Spain) S Ventura
3
7
[8]

WC
- (Argentina) M Hood
- (Argentina) S Prieto
2
2

- (Spain) N Almagro
- (Spain) S Ventura
6
6

- (Spain) Ó Hernández
- (Spain) Montañés
6
6^{8}
[10]

- (Spain) Ó Hernández
- (Spain) Montañés
1
0

3
- (Uruguay) P Cuevas
- (Argentina) M González
2
7^{10}
[8]

- (Spain) N Almagro
- (Spain) S Ventura
2
6
[14]

- (Spain) P Andújar
- (Spain) C Moyá
6^{4}
2

- (Argentina) B Dabul
- (Argentina) S Roitman
6
3
[12]

- (Argentina) J Acasuso
- (Argentina) M Vassallo Argüello
7^{7}
6

- (Argentina) J Acasuso
- (Argentina) M Vassallo Argüello

- (Argentina) B Dabul
- (Argentina) S Roitman
7
6

- (Argentina) B Dabul
- (Argentina) S Roitman
w/o

2
- (Poland) L Kubot
- (Austria) O Marach
5
2
