= 2009 Copa Telmex – Singles =

Singles
- 2009 Copa Telmex

Final
- Champion: (Spain) Tommy Robredo
- Runner-up: (Argentina) Juan Mónaco
- Score: 7–5, 2–6, 7–6^{(7–5)}

Details
- Draw: 32
- Seeds: 8

Events
| Singles | Doubles |
| ← 2008 · | Copa Telmex | · 2010 → |

David Nalbandian was the defending champion, but lost in the semifinals to Juan Mónaco.

Tommy Robredo won in the final 7–5, 2–6, 7–6^{(7–5)}, against Juan Mónaco.

== Seeds ==
1. (Argentina) David Nalbandian (semifinals)
2. (Spain) Nicolás Almagro (first round)
3. (Spain) Tommy Robredo (champion)
4. (Spain) Carlos Moyá (first round)
5. (Argentina) José Acasuso (semifinals)
6. (Spain) Albert Montañés (first round)
7. (Spain) Marcel Granollers (second round)
8. (Argentina) Eduardo Schwank (first round)

== Draw ==
=== Key ===
- Q = Qualifier
- WC = Wild card
- LL = Lucky loser
- Alt = Alternate
- SE = Special exempt
- PR = Protected ranking
- ITF = ITF entry
- JE = Junior exempt
- w/o = Walkover
- r = Retired
- d = Defaulted
- SR = Special ranking

=== Finals ===
Semifinals
1 | (Argentina) David Nalbandian | 6 | 5 | 6^{2}
(Argentina) Juan Mónaco | 2 | 7 | 7^{7}
3 | (Spain) Tommy Robredo | 6 | 7^{7}
5 | (Argentina) José Acasuso | 4 | 6^{3}

Final
(Argentina) Juan Mónaco | 5 | 6 | 6^{5}
3 | (Spain) Tommy Robredo | 7 | 2 | 7^{7}

=== Top half ===
First round
1 | (Argentina) D Nalbandian | 6 | 6
(Ecuador) N Lapentti | 3 | 3
WC | (Argentina) G Gaudio | 2 | 6 | 2
(Spain) D Gimeno-Traver | 6 | 4 | 6
(Spain) JC Ferrero | 6 | 6
(Argentina) A Calleri | 3 | 4
(Brazil) T Bellucci | 5 | 5
7 | (Spain) M Granollers | 7 | 7
4 | (Spain) C Moyá | 4 | 4
Q | (Argentina) M González | 6 | 6
(Argentina) B Dabul | 5 | 7 | 6
(France) N Devilder | 7 | 5 | 4
WC | (Argentina) S Roitman | 0 | 0
(Argentina) J Mónaco | 6 | 6
(Argentina) M Vassallo Argüello | 6 | 6
6 | (Spain) A Montañés | 2 | 3

Second round
1 | (Argentina) D Nalbandian | 7 | 6
(Spain) D Gimeno-Traver | 5 | 2
(Spain) JC Ferrero | 6^{7} | 6 | 6
7 | (Spain) M Granollers | 7^{9} | 0 | 3
Q | (Argentina) M González | 6 | 6
(Argentina) B Dabul | 3 | 1
(Argentina) J Mónaco | 6 | 2 | 6
(Argentina) M Vassallo Argüello | 4 | 6 | 2

Quarterfinals
1 | (Argentina) D Nalbandian | 6 | 3
(Spain) JC Ferrero | 3 | 0^{r}
Q | (Argentina) M González | 2 | 3
(Argentina) J Mónaco | 6 | 6

Semifinals
1 | (Argentina) D Nalbandian | 6 | 5 | 6^{2}
(Argentina) J Mónaco | 2 | 7 | 7^{7}

=== Bottom half ===
First round
8 | (Argentina) E Schwank | 3 | 7^{7} | 0
Q | (Uruguay) P Cuevas | 6 | 6^{4} | 6
Q | (Brazil) F Ferreiro | 1 | 6 | 6
(Spain) I Navarro | 6 | 4 | 2
(Spain) A Martín | 3 | 2
WC | (Argentina) JI Chela | 6 | 6
(Italy) P Starace | 7 | 3 | 3
3 | (Spain) T Robredo | 5 | 6 | 6
5 | (Argentina) J Acasuso | 6 | 7^{7}
Q | (Spain) D Muñoz de la Nava | 2 | 6^{4}
(Italy) F Fognini | 6 | 6
(Spain) P Andújar | 3 | 2
(Chile) N Massú | 6 | 4 | 4
(Argentina) D Junqueira | 3 | 6 | 6
(Spain) Ó Hernández | 6 | 1 | 6
2 | (Spain) N Almagro | 2 | 6 | 3

Second round
Q | (Uruguay) P Cuevas | 2 | 4
Q | (Brazil) F Ferreiro | 6 | 6
WC | (Argentina) JI Chela | 2 | 6 | 4
3 | (Spain) T Robredo | 6 | 3 | 6
5 | (Argentina) J Acasuso | 6 | 6
(Italy) F Fognini | 4 | 3
(Argentina) D Junqueira | 6 | 6^{5} | 0
(Spain) Ó Hernández | 3 | 7^{7} | 6

Quarterfinals
Q | (Brazil) F Ferreiro | 4 | 6^{4}
3 | (Spain) T Robredo | 6 | 7^{7}
5 | (Argentina) J Acasuso | 6 | 6
(Spain) Ó Hernández | 1 | 2

Semifinals
3 | (Spain) T Robredo | 6 | 7^{7}
5 | (Argentina) J Acasuso | 4 | 6^{3}

== Qualifying ==
=== Seeds ===
1. (Argentina) ~~Brian Dabul~~ (moved to the main draw)
2. (Argentina) Sergio Roitman (withdrew and placed into main draw)
3. (Argentina) Máximo González (qualified)
4. (Austria) Daniel Köllerer (qualifying competition)
5. (Spain) Rubén Ramírez Hidalgo (second round)
6. (Spain) Santiago Ventura Bertomeu (qualifying competition)
7. (France) Olivier Patience (first round)
8. (Uruguay) Pablo Cuevas (qualified)

=== Qualifiers ===
1. (Spain) Daniel Muñoz de la Nava
2. (Brazil) Franco Ferreiro
3. (Argentina) Máximo González
4. (Uruguay) Pablo Cuevas

=== Draw ===
==== First qualifier ====
First round
Alt | (Argentina) Lionel Noviski | 6 | 2 | 6
(Argentina) Juan-Martín Aranguren | 4 | 6 | 1
WC | (Argentina) Marco Trungelliti | 4 | 4
(Argentina) Horacio Zeballos | 6 | 6
(Serbia) Boris Pašanski | 2 | 5
(Spain) Daniel Muñoz de la Nava | 6 | 7
WC | (Argentina) Mariano Zabaleta | 6 | 6
7 | (France) Olivier Patience | 3 | 4

Second round
Alt | (Argentina) Lionel Noviski | 6^{4} | 2
(Argentina) Horacio Zeballos | 7^{7} | 6
(Spain) Daniel Muñoz de la Nava | 6 | 6
WC | (Argentina) Mariano Zabaleta | 4 | 1

Qualifying competition
(Argentina) Horacio Zeballos | 4 | 6^{7}
(Spain) Daniel Muñoz de la Nava | 6 | 7^{9}

==== Second qualifier ====
First round
2 | (Argentina) Sergio Roitman
WC | (Argentina) Andrea Collarini | w/o
(Argentina) Alejandro Fabbri | 3 | 6 | 6^{4}
(Brazil) Franco Ferreiro | 6 | 4 | 7^{7}
(Brazil) Caio Zampieri | 4 | 6 | 6
(Spain) David Marrero | 6 | 4 | 2
(Mexico) Bruno Echagaray | 2 | 6 | 4
5 | (Spain) Rubén Ramírez Hidalgo | 6 | 3 | 6

Second round
WC | (Argentina) Andrea Collarini | 6 | 3 | 2
(Brazil) Franco Ferreiro | 2 | 6 | 6
(Brazil) Caio Zampieri | 6 | 6
5 | (Spain) Rubén Ramírez Hidalgo | 3 | 2

Qualifying competition
(Brazil) Franco Ferreiro | 6 | 6
(Brazil) Caio Zampieri | 3 | 1

==== Third qualifier ====
First round
3 | (Argentina) Máximo González | 6 | 6
(Argentina) Diego Álvarez | 1 | 4
(Argentina) Juan Pablo Brzezicki | 7^{7} | 6
(Italy) Gianluca Naso | 6^{3} | 1
(Uruguay) Marcel Felder | 3 | 6 | 1
(Argentina) Juan-Pablo Amado | 6 | 4 | 6
WC | (Argentina) Guido Pella | 6^{2} | 0
6 | (Spain) Santiago Ventura Bertomeu | 7^{7} | 6

Second round
3 | (Argentina) Máximo González | 6 | 3 | 7^{8}
(Argentina) Juan Pablo Brzezicki | 0 | 6 | 6^{6}
(Argentina) Juan-Pablo Amado | 4 | 6 | 0
6 | (Spain) Santiago Ventura Bertomeu | 6 | 3 | 6

Qualifying competition
3 | (Argentina) Máximo González | 6 | 6
6 | (Spain) Santiago Ventura Bertomeu | 4 | 1

==== Fourth qualifier ====
First round
4 | (Austria) Daniel Köllerer | 6 | 6
(Brazil) João Souza | 4 | 1
(Spain) Miguel Ángel López Jaén | 5 | 7^{7} | 6^{5}
(Brazil) Ricardo Hocevar | 7 | 6^{5} | 7^{7}
(Brazil) Daniel Dutra da Silva | 6 | 6
(Argentina) Mariano Puerta | 2 | 3
(Argentina) Sebastián Decoud | 6 | 5 | 3
8 | (Uruguay) Pablo Cuevas | 2 | 7 | 6

Second round
4 | (Austria) Daniel Köllerer | 4 | 6 | 6
(Brazil) Ricardo Hocevar | 6 | 2 | 4
(Brazil) Daniel Dutra da Silva | 4 | 1
8 | (Uruguay) Pablo Cuevas | 6 | 6

Qualifying competition
4 | (Austria) Daniel Köllerer | 6 | 4 | 5
8 | (Uruguay) Pablo Cuevas | 1 | 6 | 7
