= 2022 Argentina Open – Doubles =

Doubles
- 2022 Argentina Open

Final
- Champions: (Mexico) Santiago González (Argentina) Andrés Molteni
- Runners-up: (Italy) Fabio Fognini (Argentina) Horacio Zeballos
- Score: 6–1, 6–1

Events
| Singles | Doubles |
- Argentina Open

Tomislav Brkić and Nikola Ćaćić were the defending champions but lost in the semifinals to Santiago González and Andrés Molteni.

González and Molteni went on to win the title, defeating Fabio Fognini and Horacio Zeballos in the final, 6–1, 6–1.

== Seeds ==
1. (Italy) Simone Bolelli / (Argentina) Máximo González (withdrew)
2. (Italy) Fabio Fognini / (Argentina) Horacio Zeballos (final)
3. (Uruguay) Ariel Behar / (Ecuador) Gonzalo Escobar (semifinals)
4. (Bosnia and Herzegovina) Tomislav Brkić / (Serbia) Nikola Ćaćić (semifinals)

== Draw ==
Key

- Q = Qualifier
- WC = Wild card
- LL = Lucky loser
- Alt = Alternate
- ITF = ITF entry
- PR = Protected ranking
- SR = Special ranking
- SE = Special exempt
- JE = Junior exempt
- JR = Junior Accelerator Programme entrant
- CO = College Accelerator Programme entrant
- NG = Next Gen Accelerator Program entrant
- w/o = Walkover
- r = Retired
- d = Defaulted

=== Draw ===
First round
Alt | (Argentina) H Casanova (Peru) S Galdós | 4 | 1
(Italy) L Sonego (Italy) A Vavassori | 6 | 6
(Brazil) R Matos (Brazil) F Meligeni Alves | 3 | 4
(Mexico) S González (Argentina) A Molteni | 6 | 6
4 | (Bosnia and Herzegovina) T Brkić (Serbia) N Ćaćić | 6 | 6
(Monaco) R Arneodo (France) B Paire | 2 | 2
WC | (Argentina) F Cerúndolo (Argentina) TM Etcheverry | 5 | 5
(Serbia) M Kecmanović (Brazil) F Romboli | 7 | 7
(Spain) P Andújar (Spain) P Martínez | 6 | 5 | [4]
(Spain) R Carballés Baena (Spain) J Munar | 2 | 7 | [10]
Alt | (Italy) M Cecchinato (Spain) C Taberner | 2 | 0
3 | (Uruguay) A Behar (Ecuador) G Escobar | 6 | 6
Alt | (Argentina) A Collarini (Spain) M Vilella Martínez | 6 | 1 | [10]
(Argentina) F Coria (Argentina) F Delbonis | 2 | 6 | [7]
(Brazil) O Luz (Brazil) T Monteiro | 6^{4} | 5
2 | (Italy) F Fognini (Argentina) H Zeballos | 7^{7} | 7

Quarterfinals
(Italy) L Sonego (Italy) A Vavassori | 4 | 1
(Mexico) S González (Argentina) A Molteni | 6 | 6
4 | (Bosnia and Herzegovina) T Brkić (Serbia) N Ćaćić | 6^{3} | 6 | [10]
(Serbia) M Kecmanović (Brazil) F Romboli | 7^{7} | 3 | [7]
(Spain) R Carballés Baena (Spain) J Munar | 6^{2} | 2
3 | (Uruguay) A Behar (Ecuador) G Escobar | 7^{7} | 6
Alt | (Argentina) A Collarini (Spain) M Vilella Martínez | 7 | 2 | [12]
2 | (Italy) F Fognini (Argentina) H Zeballos | 5 | 6 | [14]

Semifinals
(Mexico) S González (Argentina) A Molteni | 7 | 4 | [10]
4 | (Bosnia and Herzegovina) T Brkić (Serbia) N Ćaćić | 5 | 6 | [6]
3 | (Uruguay) A Behar (Ecuador) G Escobar | 6 | 2 | [8]
2 | (Italy) F Fognini (Argentina) H Zeballos | 4 | 6 | [10]

Final
(Mexico) S González (Argentina) A Molteni | 6 | 6
2 | (Italy) F Fognini (Argentina) H Zeballos | 1 | 1
