= 2009 Copa Telmex =

- Date: 16–22 February
- Edition: 12th
- Category: International Series
- Draw: 32S / 16D
- Prize money: $531,000
- Surface: Clay / outdoor
- Location: Buenos Aires, Argentina
- Venue: Buenos Aires Lawn Tennis Club

Champions

Singles
- (Spain) Tommy Robredo

Doubles
- (Spain) Marcel Granollers / (Spain) Alberto Martín
← 2008 ·	ATP Buenos Aires	· 2010 →

The 2009 Copa Telmex was a tennis tournament played on outdoor clay courts. It was the 12th edition of the Copa Telmex, and was part of the International Series of the 2009 ATP Tour. It took place in Buenos Aires, Argentina, from February 16 through February 22, 2009.

The singles line up was led by world no. 10 and defending champion David Nalbandian, Nicolás Almagro and 2009 Costa do Sauípe champion Tommy Robredo. Other top seeds are Carlos Moyá, 2009 Viña del Mar finalist José Acasuso, Albert Montañés, Marcel Granollers and Eduardo Schwank.

== Entrants ==
=== Seeds ===
Athlete	Nationality	Ranking*	Seeding
David Nalbandian	Argentina	10	1
Nicolás Almagro	Spain	18	2
Tommy Robredo	Spain	19	3
Carlos Moyá	Spain	40	4
José Acasuso	Argentina	41	5
Albert Montañés	Spain	42	6
Marcel Granollers	Spain	47	7
Eduardo Schwank	Argentina	52	8

=== Other entrants ===
The following players received wildcards into the main draw:

- (Argentina) Gastón Gaudio
- (Argentina) Sergio Roitman
- (Argentina) Juan Ignacio Chela

The following players received entry from the qualifying draw:

- (Spain) Daniel Muñoz-de la Nava
- (Brazil) Franco Ferreiro
- (Argentina) Máximo González
- (Uruguay) Pablo Cuevas

== Finals ==
=== Singles ===
(Spain) Tommy Robredo defeated (Argentina) Juan Mónaco, 7–5, 2–6, 7–6^{(7–5)}

- It was Robredo's 2nd title of the year and 9th of his career.

=== Doubles ===
(Spain) Marcel Granollers / (Spain) Alberto Martín defeated (Spain) Nicolás Almagro / (Spain) Santiago Ventura, 6–3, 5–7, [10–8]
