= 2008 Copa Telmex – Doubles =

Doubles
- 2008 Copa Telmex

Final
- Champions: (Argentina) Agustín Calleri; (Peru) Luis Horna
- Runners-up: (Austria) Werner Eschauer; (Australia) Peter Luczak
- Score: 6–0, 6–7^{(6–8)}, [10–2]

Events
Singles	Doubles
← 2007 ·	Copa Telmex	· 2009 →

Martín García and Sebastián Prieto were the defending champions, but chose not to participate that year.

Agustín Calleri and Luis Horna won in the final 6–0, 6–7^{(6–8)}, [10–2], against Werner Eschauer and Peter Luczak.

== Seeds ==
1. (Argentina) Martín García / (Brazil) Marcelo Melo (withdrew)
2. (Czech Republic) František Čermák / (Czech Republic) Leoš Friedl (quarterfinals)
3. (Austria) Oliver Marach / (Slovakia) Michal Mertiňák (first round)
4. (Uruguay) Pablo Cuevas / (Argentina) Brian Dabul (first round)

== Draw ==
=== Key ===
- Q = Qualifier
- WC = Wild card
- LL = Lucky loser
- Alt = Alternate
- SE = Special exempt
- PR = Protected ranking
- ITF = ITF entry
- JE = Junior exempt
- w/o = Walkover
- r = Retired
- d = Defaulted
- SR = Special ranking

=== Draw ===
First round

Quarterfinals

Semifinals

Final

ALT
- (Spain) P Andújar
- (Spain) D Gimeno Traver
4
6
[7]

- (Spain) Ó Hernández
- (Argentina) S Roitman
6
3
[10]

- (Spain) Ó Hernández
- (Argentina) S Roitman
3
4

- (Argentina) C Berlocq
- (Argentina) H Zeballos
3
0

- (Spain) Montañés
- (Spain) R Ramírez Hidalgo
6
6

- (Spain) Montañés
- (Spain) R Ramírez Hidalgo
6
6

- (Spain) Montañés
- (Spain) R Ramírez Hidalgo
6
3
[10]

3
- (Austria) O Marach
- (Slovakia) M Mertiňák
4
4

- (Austria) W Eschauer
- (Australia) P Luczak
4
6
[12]

- (Argentina) JP Brzezicki
- (Spain) S Ventura
6
6

- (Argentina) JP Brzezicki
- (Spain) S Ventura
4
6
[8]

- (Austria) W Eschauer
- (Australia) P Luczak
4
6
[15]

- (Austria) W Eschauer
- (Australia) P Luczak
6
3
[10]

ALT
- (Argentina) J-M Aranguren
- (Argentina) D Junqueira
6
3
[13]

- (Austria) W Eschauer
- (Australia) P Luczak
0
7^{8}
[2]

- (Italy) L Azzaro
- (Italy) P Starace
3
4

- (Argentina) A Calleri
- (Peru) L Horna
6
6^{6}
[10]

WC
- (Argentina) J Acasuso
- (Argentina) M Hood
6
6

WC
- (Argentina) J Acasuso
- (Argentina) M Hood
6
7^{11}

WC
- (Argentina) L Arnold Ker
- (Argentina) S Prieto
6
6

WC
- (Argentina) L Arnold Ker
- (Argentina) S Prieto
4
6^{9}

4
- (Uruguay) P Cuevas
- (Argentina) B Dabul
2
3

WC
- (Argentina) J Acasuso
- (Argentina) M Hood
3
6
[8]

- (Argentina) M González
- (Spain) M Granollers Pujol
6^{4}
4

- (Argentina) A Calleri
- (Peru) L Horna
6
1
[10]

- (Argentina) A Calleri
- (Peru) L Horna
7^{7}
6

- (Argentina) A Calleri
- (Peru) L Horna
7
6

- (Italy) F Fognini
- (Italy) F Volandri
3
6
[6]

2
- (Czech Republic) F Čermák
- (Czech Republic) L Friedl
5
2

2
- (Czech Republic) F Čermák
- (Czech Republic) L Friedl
6
3
[10]
