= 2011 Copa Claro – Singles =

Singles
- 2011 Copa Claro

Final
- Champion: (Spain) Nicolás Almagro
- Runner-up: (Argentina) Juan Ignacio Chela
- Score: 6–3, 3–6, 6–4

Events
Singles	Doubles
← 2010 ·	Copa Claro	· 2012 →

Juan Carlos Ferrero was the defending champion but decided not to participate due to knee and wrist injuries.
Nicolás Almagro won his second title of the year, defeating Juan Ignacio Chela 6–3, 3–6, 6–4 in the final.

== Seeds ==
1. (Spain) Nicolás Almagro (champion)
2. (Switzerland) Stanislas Wawrinka (semifinals)
3. (Argentina) David Nalbandian (quarterfinals)
4. (Spain) Albert Montañés (quarterfinals)
5. (Argentina) Juan Mónaco (quarterfinals)
6. (Spain) Tommy Robredo (semifinals)
7. (Ukraine) Alexandr Dolgopolov (first round)
8. (Argentina) Juan Ignacio Chela (final)

== Draw ==
=== Key ===
- Q = Qualifier
- WC = Wild card
- LL = Lucky loser
- Alt = Alternate
- SE = Special exempt
- PR = Protected ranking
- ITF = ITF entry
- JE = Junior exempt
- w/o = Walkover
- r = Retired
- d = Defaulted
- SR = Special ranking

=== Finals ===
Semifinals
1	(Spain) Nicolás Almagro	7	6
6	(Spain) Tommy Robredo	5	1
8	(Argentina) Juan Ignacio Chela	6	6
2	(Switzerland) Stanislas Wawrinka	2	2

Final
1	(Spain) Nicolás Almagro	6	3	6
8	(Argentina) Juan Ignacio Chela	3	6	4

=== Top half ===
First round
1	(Spain) N Almagro	6	6
Q	(Argentina) P Galdón	1	2
(Argentina) L Mayer	7	7
WC	(Argentina) F Delbonis	6^{1}	5
(Poland) Ł Kubot	7	5	3
(Uruguay) P Cuevas	5	7	6
WC	(Argentina) J Acasuso	6	6
7	(Ukraine) A Dolgopolov	2	4
3	(Argentina) D Nalbandian	6	6
(Italy) P Starace	4	4
Q	(Argentina) JP Brzezicki	6	6
(Italy) F Volandri	1	3
Q	(Spain) A Ramos-Viñolas	6	6
(Brazil) J Souza	4	0
WC	(Argentina) M González	5	2
6	(Spain) T Robredo	7	6

Second round
1	(Spain) N Almagro	6^{3}	6	6
(Argentina) L Mayer	7	1	3
(Uruguay) P Cuevas	7	5	1
WC	(Argentina) J Acasuso	6^{2}	7	6
3	(Argentina) D Nalbandian	6	6
Q	(Argentina) JP Brzezicki	1	2
Q	(Spain) A Ramos-Viñolas	3	5
6	(Spain) T Robredo	6	7

Quarterfinals
1	(Spain) N Almagro	7	6
WC	(Argentina) J Acasuso	5	3
3	(Argentina) D Nalbandian	4	4
6	(Spain) T Robredo	6	6

Semifinals
1	(Spain) N Almagro	7	6
6	(Spain) T Robredo	5	1

=== Bottom half ===
First round
8	(Argentina) JI Chela	4	6	6
(Portugal) R Machado	6	2	2
(Spain) P Andújar	6^{3}	2
(Argentina) H Zeballos	7	6
(Italy) F Fognini	1	6	6
(Portugal) F Gil	6	2	2
(Spain) R Ramírez Hidalgo	1	6^{0}
4	(Spain) A Montañés	6	7
5	(Argentina) J Mónaco	6	7
Q	(Spain) I Navarro	2	6^{2}
(Russia) I Andreev	4	6^{3}
(Argentina) E Schwank	6	7
(Spain) D Gimeno-Traver	3	6^{3}
(Romania) V Hănescu	6	7
(Argentina) C Berlocq	4	6	3
2	(Switzerland) S Wawrinka	6	3	6

Second round
8	(Argentina) JI Chela	7	6
(Argentina) H Zeballos	5	2
(Italy) F Fognini	2	6	4
4	(Spain) A Montañés	6	4	6
5	(Argentina) J Mónaco	7	6
(Argentina) E Schwank	6^{5}	2
(Romania) V Hănescu	7	1	6^{4}
2	(Switzerland) S Wawrinka	6^{2}	6	7

Quarterfinals
8	(Argentina) JI Chela	6	3	6
4	(Spain) A Montañés	4	6	3
5	(Argentina) J Mónaco	5	3
2	(Switzerland) S Wawrinka	7	6

Semifinals
8	(Argentina) JI Chela	6	6
2	(Switzerland) S Wawrinka	2	2
