= 2022 Argentina Open – Singles =

Singles
- 2022 Argentina Open

Final
- Champion: (Norway) Casper Ruud
- Runner-up: (Argentina) Diego Schwartzman
- Score: 5–7, 6–2, 6–3

Details
- Draw: 28 (4 Q / 3 WC )
- Seeds: 8

Events
Singles	Doubles
- ATP Buenos Aires

Casper Ruud defeated the defending champion Diego Schwartzman in the final, 5–7, 6–2, 6–3 to win the singles title at the 2022 Argentina Open.

Former US Open champion Juan Martín del Potro played the last professional match of his career against Federico Delbonis in the first round, losing 6-1 6–3.

== Seeds ==
The top four seeds received a bye into the second round.

1. (Norway) Casper Ruud (champion)
2. (Argentina) Diego Schwartzman (final)
3. (Italy) Lorenzo Sonego (semifinals)
4. (Italy) Fabio Fognini (quarterfinals)
5. (Serbia) Dušan Lajović (second round)
6. (Argentina) Federico Delbonis (semifinals)
7. (Spain) Albert Ramos Viñolas (first round)
8. (Serbia) Laslo Đere (first round)

== Draw ==
Key

- Q = Qualifier
- WC = Wild card
- LL = Lucky loser
- Alt = Alternate
- ITF = ITF entry
- PR = Protected ranking
- SR = Special ranking
- SE = Special exempt
- JE = Junior exempt
- JR = Junior Accelerator Programme entrant
- CO = College Accelerator Programme entrant
- NG = Next Gen Accelerator Program entrant
- w/o = Walkover
- r = Retired
- d = Defaulted

=== Finals ===
Semifinals
1	(Norway) Casper Ruud	6	6
6	(Argentina) Federico Delbonis	3	3
3	(Italy) Lorenzo Sonego	5	6	2
2	(Argentina) Diego Schwartzman	7	3	6

Final
1	(Norway) Casper Ruud	5	6	6
2	(Argentina) Diego Schwartzman	7	2	3

=== Top half ===
First round
(Spain) R Carballés Baena	7^{7}	6
Q	(Chile) N Jarry	6^{2}	2
PR	(Uruguay) P Cuevas	1	6	3
(Argentina) F Coria	6	1	6
(France) B Paire	6	4	6^{3}
5	(Serbia) D Lajović	4	6	7^{7}
SE	(Chile) A Tabilo	2	4
(Spain) P Martínez	6	6
SE	(Argentina) JI Londero	2	4
PR	(Spain) P Andújar	6	6
WC	(Argentina) JM del Potro	1	3
6	(Argentina) F Delbonis	6	6

Second round
1	(Norway) C Ruud	7^{7}	6
(Spain) R Carballés Baena	6^{2}	3
(Argentina) F Coria	4	7	6
5	(Serbia) D Lajović	6	5	4
4	(Italy) F Fognini	6	7^{7}
(Spain) P Martínez	4	6^{5}
PR	(Spain) P Andújar	4	4
6	(Argentina) F Delbonis	6	6

Quarterfinals
1	(Norway) C Ruud	6	6
(Argentina) F Coria	3	4
4	(Italy) F Fognini	4	4
6	(Argentina) F Delbonis	6	6

Semifinals
1	(Norway) C Ruud	6	6
6	(Argentina) F Delbonis	3	3

=== Bottom half ===
First round
7	(Spain) A Ramos Viñolas	3	3
(Brazil) T Monteiro	6	6
Q	(Bolivia) H Dellien	4	6	1
PR	(Spain) F Verdasco	6	3	6
WC	(Argentina) S Báez	7^{7}	6
WC	(Denmark) H Rune	6^{4}	3
8	(Serbia) L Đere	4	6	1
(Serbia) M Kecmanović	6	1	6
Q	(Argentina) F Cerúndolo	7	6
(Argentina) F Bagnis	5	2
(Spain) J Munar	6	6
Q	(Argentina) TM Etcheverry	4	4

Second round
(Brazil) T Monteiro	6	3	5
PR	(Spain) F Verdasco	2	6	7
WC	(Argentina) S Báez	3	3
3	(Italy) L Sonego	6	6
(Serbia) M Kecmanović	3	6	2
Q	(Argentina) F Cerúndolo	6	3	6
(Spain) J Munar	6^{2}	6^{4}
2	(Argentina) D Schwartzman	7^{7}	7^{7}

Quarterfinals
PR	(Spain) F Verdasco	4	6^{4}
3	(Italy) L Sonego	6	7^{7}
Q	(Argentina) F Cerúndolo	6	2	5
2	(Argentina) D Schwartzman	3	6	7

Semifinals
3	(Italy) L Sonego	5	6	2
2	(Argentina) D Schwartzman	7	3	6

== Qualifying ==
=== Seeds ===
1. (Italy) Marco Cecchinato (first round)
2. (Spain) Carlos Taberner (qualifying competition)
3. (Bolivia) Hugo Dellien (qualified)
4. (Argentina) Francisco Cerúndolo (qualified)
5. (Germany) Yannick Hanfmann (qualifying competition)
6. (Argentina) Tomás Martín Etcheverry (qualified)
7. (Brazil) Thiago Seyboth Wild (qualifying competition)
8. (Serbia) Nikola Milojević (first round)

=== Qualifiers ===
1. (Argentina) Tomás Martín Etcheverry
2. (Chile) Nicolás Jarry
3. (Bolivia) Hugo Dellien
4. (Argentina) Francisco Cerúndolo

=== Qualifying draw ===
==== First qualifier ====
First round
1	(Italy) Marco Cecchinato	2	2
Alt	(Kazakhstan) Dmitry Popko	6	6
(Czech Republic) Zdeněk Kolář	3	2
6	(Argentina) Tomás Martín Etcheverry	6	6

Qualifying competition
Alt	(Kazakhstan) Dmitry Popko	4	2
6	(Argentina) Tomás Martín Etcheverry	6	6

==== Second qualifier ====
First round
2	(Spain) Carlos Taberner	6	6
WC	(Argentina) Federico Agustín Gómez	3	2
(Chile) Nicolás Jarry	6	7^{11}
8	(Serbia) Nikola Milojević	3	6^{9}

Qualifying competition
2	(Spain) Carlos Taberner	6^{5}	3
(Chile) Nicolás Jarry	7^{7}	6

==== Third qualifier ====
First round
3	(Bolivia) Hugo Dellien	7^{7}	6
Alt	(Italy) Alessandro Giannessi	6^{3}	1
WC	(Argentina) Thiago Agustín Tirante	3	0^{r}
7	(Brazil) Thiago Seyboth Wild	6	2

Qualifying competition
3	(Bolivia) Hugo Dellien	6	7
7	(Brazil) Thiago Seyboth Wild	3	5

==== Fourth qualifier ====
First round
4	(Argentina) Francisco Cerúndolo	6	6
Alt	(Argentina) Camilo Ugo Carabelli	4	3
(Spain) Mario Vilella Martínez	6	6^{0}	3
5	(Germany) Yannick Hanfmann	4	7^{7}	6

Qualifying competition
4	(Argentina) Francisco Cerúndolo	7^{7}	6
5	(Germany) Yannick Hanfmann	6^{4}	1
