= 2011 Copa Claro =

- Date: 14–20 February
- Edition: 14th
- Category: ATP World Tour 250 series
- Draw: 32S / 16D
- Prize money: $478,900
- Surface: Clay / outdoor
- Location: Buenos Aires, Argentina

Champions

Singles
- (Spain) Nicolás Almagro

Doubles
- (Austria) Oliver Marach / (Argentina) Leonardo Mayer
← 2010 ·	ATP Buenos Aires	· 2012 →

The 2011 Copa Claro was a men's tennis tournament played on outdoor clay courts. It was the 14th edition of the Copa Claro, and was part of the ATP World Tour 250 series of the 2011 ATP World Tour. It took place in Buenos Aires, Argentina, from February 14 through February 20, 2011. Nicolás Almagro won the singles title.

== Finals ==
=== Singles ===
(Spain) Nicolás Almagro defeated (Argentina) Juan Ignacio Chela 6–3, 3–6, 6–4.

- It was Almagro's 2nd title of the year and 9th of his career.

=== Doubles ===
(Austria) Oliver Marach / (Argentina) Leonardo Mayer defeated (Brazil) Franco Ferreiro / (Brazil) André Sá, 7–6^{(8–6)}, 6–3

== Entrants ==
=== Seeds ===
Country	Player	Rank^{1}	Seed
ESP	Nicolás Almagro	13	1
SUI	Stanislas Wawrinka	14	2
ARG	David Nalbandian	19	3
ESP	Albert Montañés	25	4
ARG	Juan Mónaco	29	5
ESP	Tommy Robredo	31	6
UKR	Alexandr Dolgopolov	32	7
ARG	Juan Ignacio Chela	39	8

- Rankings are as of February 7, 2011.

=== Other entrants ===
The following players received wildcards into the main draw:

- (Argentina) José Acasuso
- (Argentina) Federico del Bonis
- (Argentina) Máximo González

The following players received entry from the qualifying draw:

- (Argentina) Juan Pablo Brzezicki
- (Argentina) Pablo Galdón
- (Spain) Iván Navarro
- (Spain) Albert Ramos-Viñolas
