= 2022 Argentina Open =

- Date: 7–13 February
- Edition: 25th
- Category: ATP Tour 250 series
- Draw: 28S / 16D
- Prize money: $686,700
- Surface: Clay / outdoor
- Location: Buenos Aires, Argentina
- Venue: Buenos Aires Lawn Tennis Club

Champions

Singles
- (Norway) Casper Ruud

Doubles
- (Mexico) Santiago González / (Argentina) Andrés Molteni
- ATP Buenos Aires

The 2022 Argentina Open was a men's tennis tournament played on outdoor clay courts. It was the 25th edition of the ATP Buenos Aires event, and part of the ATP Tour 250 series of the 2022 ATP Tour. It took place in Buenos Aires, Argentina, from 7 to 13 February 2022.

The tournament marked the return of US Open champion and former world No. 3 Juan Martín del Potro of Argentina from knee injury. He had not played an ATP match since June 2019.

== Finals ==
=== Singles ===
- (Norway) Casper Ruud def. (Argentina) Diego Schwartzman, 5–7, 6–2, 6–3

=== Doubles ===
- (Mexico) Santiago González / (Argentina) Andrés Molteni def. (Italy) Fabio Fognini / (Argentina) Horacio Zeballos, 6–1, 6–1

== Points and prize money ==
=== Point distribution ===
Event	W	F	SF	QF	Round of 16	Round of 32	Q	Q2	Q1
Singles	250	150	90	45	20	0	12	6	0
Doubles	250	150	90	45	0	—N/a	—N/a	—N/a	—N/a

=== Prize money ===
Event	W	F	SF	QF	Round of 16	Round of 32	Q2	Q1
Singles	$91,600	$53,435	$31,410	$18,205	$10,570	$6,460	$3,230	$1,760
Doubles*	$31,830	$17,030	$9,970	$5,580	$3,290	—N/a	—N/a	—N/a

_{*per team}

== Singles main draw entrants ==
=== Seeds ===
Country	Player	Rank^{1}	Seed
NOR	Casper Ruud	8	1
ARG	Diego Schwartzman	14	2
ITA	Lorenzo Sonego	23	3
ITA	Fabio Fognini	31	4
SRB	Dušan Lajović	38	5
ARG	Federico Delbonis	41	6
ESP	Albert Ramos Viñolas	44	7
SRB	Laslo Đere	49	8

- ^{1} Rankings are as of 31 January 2022.

=== Other entrants ===
The following players received wildcards into the singles main draw:

- (Argentina) Sebastián Báez
- (Argentina) Juan Martín del Potro
- (Denmark) Holger Rune

The following players received special exempts into the main draw:

- (Argentina) Juan Ignacio Londero
- (Chile) Alejandro Tabilo

The following players received entry using a protected ranking into the singles main draw:

- (Spain) Pablo Andújar
- (Uruguay) Pablo Cuevas
- (Spain) Fernando Verdasco

The following players received entry from the qualifying draw:

- (Argentina) Francisco Cerúndolo
- (Bolivia) Hugo Dellien
- (Argentina) Tomás Martín Etcheverry
- (Chile) Nicolás Jarry

=== Withdrawals ===
Before the tournament

- (Austria) Dominic Thiem → replaced by (Brazil) Thiago Monteiro

== Doubles main draw entrants ==
=== Seeds ===
Country	Player	Country	Player	Rank^{1}	Seed
~~ITA~~	~~Simone Bolelli~~	~~ARG~~	~~Máximo González~~	~~45~~	~~1~~
ITA	Fabio Fognini	ARG	Horacio Zeballos	77	2
URU	Ariel Behar	ECU	Gonzalo Escobar	77	3
BIH	Tomislav Brkić	SRB	Nikola Ćaćić	79	4

- ^{1} Rankings as of 31 January 2022.

=== Other entrants ===
The following pairs received wildcards into the doubles main draw:

- (Argentina) Francisco Cerúndolo / (Argentina) Tomás Martín Etcheverry
- ~~(Denmark) Holger Rune / (Argentina) Thiago Agustín Tirante~~

The following pairs received entry as alternates into the doubles main draw:

- (Italy) Marco Cecchinato / (Spain) Carlos Taberner
- (Argentina) Hernán Casanova / (Peru) Sergio Galdós

=== Withdrawals ===
Before the tournament

- (Argentina) Facundo Bagnis / (Spain) Albert Ramos Viñolas → replaced by (Argentina) Andrea Collarini / (Spain) Mario Vilella Martínez
- (Italy) Simone Bolelli / (Argentina) Máximo González → replaced by (Argentina) Hernán Casanova / (Peru) Sergio Galdós
- (Brazil) Marcelo Demoliner / (Serbia) Miomir Kecmanović → replaced by (Serbia) Miomir Kecmanović / (Brazil) Fernando Romboli
- (Denmark) Holger Rune / (Argentina) Thiago Agustín Tirante → replaced by (Italy) Marco Cecchinato / (Spain) Carlos Taberner
