= 2008 Copa Telmex =

- Date: 18–24 February
- Edition: 11th
- Category: International Series
- Draw: 32S / 16D
- Prize money: $441,000
- Surface: Clay / outdoor
- Location: Buenos Aires, Argentina
- Venue: Buenos Aires Lawn Tennis Club

Champions

Singles
- (Argentina) David Nalbandian

Doubles
- (Argentina) Agustín Calleri / (Peru) Luis Horna
← 2007 ·	ATP Buenos Aires	· 2009 →

The 2008 Copa Telmex was a tennis tournament played on outdoor clay courts. It was the 11th edition of the event known that year as Copa Telmex, and was part of the International Series of the 2008 ATP Tour. It took place at the Buenos Aires Lawn Tennis Club in Buenos Aires, Argentina, from February 18 through February 24, 2008.

The singles field was led by ATP No. 11, 2007 Madrid Masters and 2007 Paris Masters champion David Nalbandian, Viña del Mar singles and doubles runner-up Juan Mónaco, and Costa do Sauípe finalist Carlos Moyá. Other seeds were 2007 US Open quarterfinalist Juan Ignacio Chela, Costa do Sauípe winner Nicolás Almagro, Igor Andreev, Potito Starace and Filippo Volandri.

== Entrants ==
=== Seeds ===
Athlete	Nationality	Ranking*	Seeding
David Nalbandian	Argentina	11	1
Juan Mónaco	Argentina	14	2
Carlos Moyá	Spain	13	3
Juan Ignacio Chela	Argentina	25	4
Nicolás Almagro	Spain	29	5
Igor Andreev	Russia	32	6
Potito Starace	Italy	35	7
Filippo Volandri	Italy	41	8

=== Other entrants ===
The following players received wildcards into the main draw:

- (Argentina) Eduardo Schwank
- (Argentina) Máximo González

The following players received entry from the qualifying draw:

- (Brazil) Thomaz Bellucci
- (Spain) Daniel Gimeno Traver
- (Spain) Rubén Ramírez Hidalgo
- (Czech Republic) Ivo Minář

The following player received entry by a Special Exempt (SE):

- (Ecuador) Nicolás Lapentti

The following players received Lucky loser into the main draw:

- (France) Éric Prodon

== Finals ==
=== Singles ===
(Argentina) David Nalbandian defeated (Argentina) José Acasuso, 3–6, 7–6^{(7–5)}, 6–4

- It was David Nalbandian's 1st title of the year, and his 8th overall.

=== Doubles ===
(Argentina) Agustín Calleri / (Peru) Luis Horna defeated (Austria) Werner Eschauer / (Australia) Peter Luczak, 6–0, 6–7^{(6–8)}, [10–2]
