= Peter Luczak =

Australian tennis player

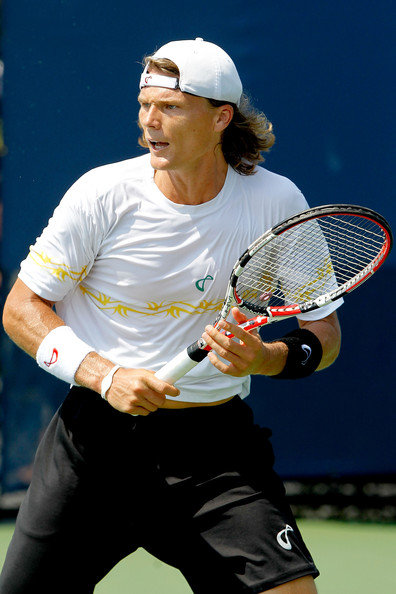
- Country (sports): Australia
- Residence: Melbourne, Australia
- Born: 31 August 1979 (age 47) Warsaw, Poland
- Height: 1.83 m (6 ft 0 in)
- Turned pro: 2000
- Retired: 2012 (last match 2016)
- Plays: Right-handed (two-handed backhand)
- College: Fresno State
- Prize money: US$ 1,348,936

Singles
- Career record: 41–89 (Grand Slam, ATP Tour level, and Davis Cup)
- Career titles: 0
- Highest ranking: No. 64 (12 October 2009)

Grand Slam singles results
- Australian Open: 3R (2003, 2006)
- French Open: 1R (2005, 2007, 2008, 2010)
- Wimbledon: 2R (2010)
- US Open: 1R (2005, 2007, 2009, 2010)

Doubles
- Career record: 23–42
- Career titles: 0
- Highest ranking: No. 98 (1 March 2010)

Grand Slam doubles results
- Australian Open: 2R (2005, 2010, 2012)
- French Open: 2R (2010)
- Wimbledon: 2R (2003)
- US Open: 2R (2002)

Mixed doubles
- Career record: 3–8
- Career titles: 0

Grand Slam mixed doubles results
- Australian Open: 1R (2003, 2005, 2006, 2010, 2011)
- Wimbledon: 3R (2003)

Team competitions
- Davis Cup: SF (2006)
- Hopman Cup: RR (2008)
Medal record
Representing Australia
Commonwealth Games
Gold medal – first place	2010 Delhi	Doubles

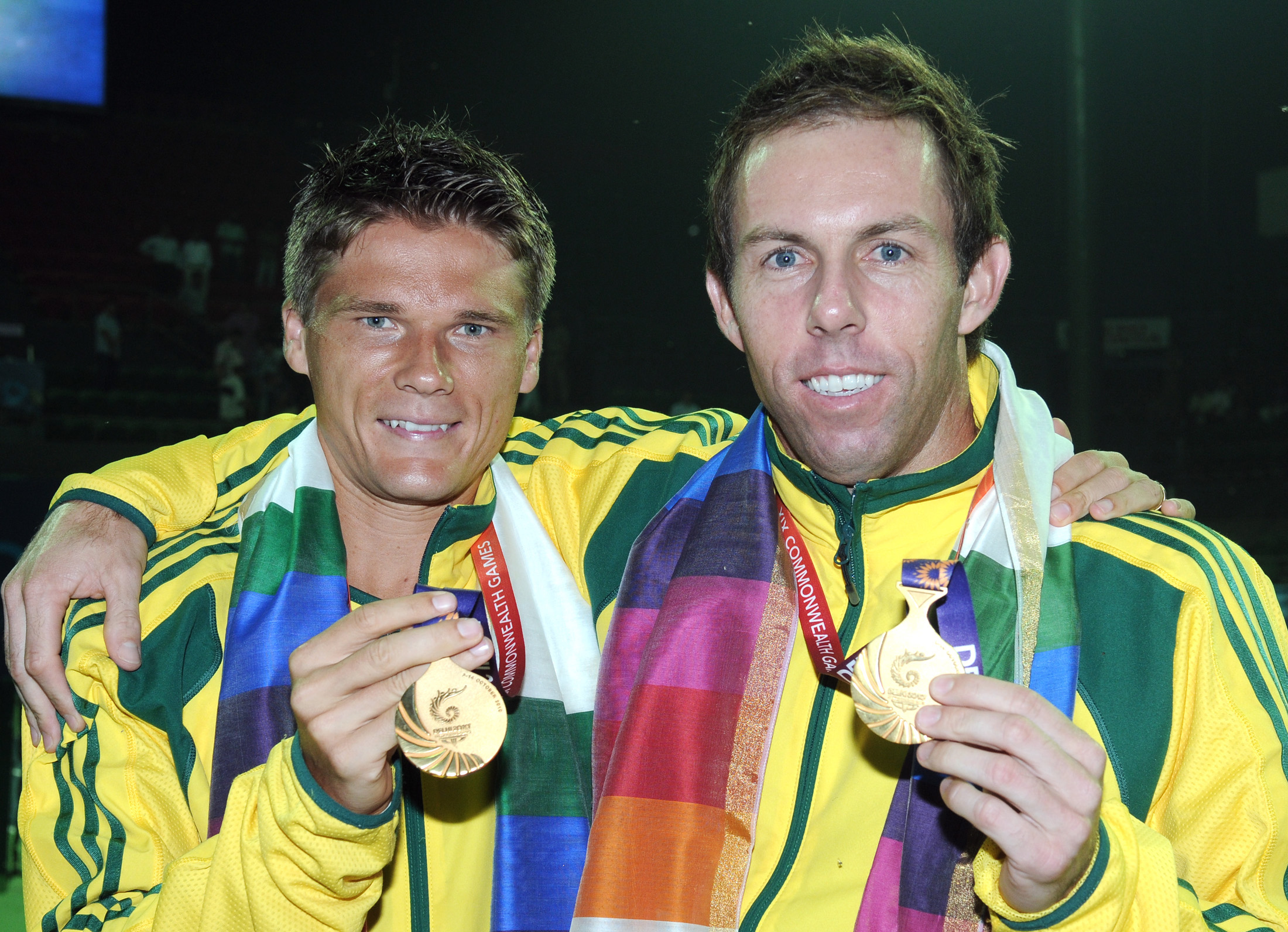
XIX Commonwealth Games-2010 Delhi Tennis (Men's Double) Paul Hanley and Peter Luczak (left) of Australia won the gold medal, at R K Khanna Tennis Stadium, in New Delhi on 9 October 2010

Peter Luczak (Polish: Łuczak, pronounced [ˈwuʈ͡ʂak]; born 31 August 1979) is a retired professional tennis player from Australia. His career-high ATP singles ranking was World No. 64, achieved in October 2009.

At the 2010 Commonwealth Games held in Delhi, Luczak won the Gold in the doubles.

Luczak came to Australia at 9 months of age, when his parents, Eva and Kris, left Warsaw in 1980, where they settled in Melbourne. Luczak started playing tennis at the age of 5, he was introduced to the game by his Polish born father Kris. He did not have major success at junior level and was not able to receive funding from Tennis Australia nor have a major sponsor. Former AFL player Nathan Brown defeated Peter Luczak 6-3 6-4 on grass, in a Warrnambool Under 16's grass tournament. Heatherdale Club stalwart Ricky Moore claims to have beaten Luczak in around 1992 and very little thereafter. Luczak was able to gain a tennis scholarship at Fresno State, which helped his tennis development and in the process getting a degree in finance without the financial burden.

During his time at Fresno, Luczak holds the record for most career singles wins. He went 27–0 in the senior season at Fresno State before being upset in the first round of the NCAA Tournament.

== Tennis career ==
Luczak turned professional in 2000 and spent the year playing on the ITF Futures and ATP Challenger Series circuit during his break from university. In 2000 he made the Futures final in Clearwater losing to Dmitry Tursunov. Luczak won 4 Futures titles in 2001 and finished the year ranked at #280.

In 2002 Luczak played exclusively ATP Challenger Series circuit where he won his first title in Granby and lost to countryman Scott Draper at Binghamton in the final. He made his Grand Slam debut in 2003 at the Australian Open where he reached the 3rd round defeating Attila Sávolt and Renzo Furlan before losing to Mario Ančić.

Continuing to focus mostly on the Challengers in 2004, Luczak won two more Challenger events in Canberra and Košice which was on his favoured clay surface. Luczak made his Davis Cup debut for Australia in 2005 against Argentina on grass, where he lost a dead rubber to Guillermo Coria, in addition to this he reached his best ever performance at ATP level where reached the semi-finals as a qualifier beating Fernando González at the Brasil Open along the way before losing to Alberto Martín.

Luczak equalled his best Australian Open performance by making the third round in 2006 losing in four sets to Tommy Haas indoors as the roof was closed due to the heat rule. He represented Australia against Switzerland in Davis Cup and defeating Michael Lammer to help Australia win that tie.

In 2007 Luczak finished the season in the top 100 for the first time. He based that on winning a career best four titles on the ATP Challenger Series circuit, all of these titles came on the clay. Luczak lost to Jonas Björkman at Roland Garros in the first round after leading 2 sets to 0 and also played against Serbia in the World Group promotion tie in Belgrade where he lost to Novak Djokovic and Boris Pašanski.

After reaching his career high ranking in 2008, Luczak was diagnosed with a stress fracture of the pelvis after his loss to Jürgen Melzer at Roland Garros and was out for 14 weeks before returning to play against Chile in Davis Cup. Luczak stayed on in South America and played the Copa Petrobras series of challengers on the clay, where he won Montevideo beating Pablo Cuevas 6–3, 7–6 in the semis before getting a walkover from Nicolás Massú in the final. He won the Copa Petrobras Masters event where the best performers in the series play off where he beat Thomaz Bellucci.

He was elected to the ATP Player Council, currently comprising Roger Federer (President), Rafael Nadal (Vice President), Novak Djokovic, Michael Berrer, Yves Allegro, Eric Butorac, David Martin & Martín García.

In 2009, Luczak did not receive a wild card to the Australian Open and he lost in the last round of qualification to Wayne Odesnik. He continued his comeback from the pelvis problem on the Challenger circuit, where he made the semis in Burnie and Meknes. After falling in the second round of the Roland Garros qualification to Alexander Flock after having 5 match points. Luczak defeated Flock in the last round of qualification for the Fürth Challenger where he won the event without dropping a set in the main draw. He made the semis in Lugano losing to Stanislas Wawrinka and qualified for Båstad defeating Alberto Martín and then losing to Tommy Robredo. Luczak won the challenger in Poznań and made the semis in San Marino losing to Potito Starace. He followed that result with another Challenger title in Cordenons where he defeated Christophe Rochus and Olivier Rochus in the semi-final and the final. Luczak reached his career high ranking of # 64 on 12 October 2009.

In 2010, he competed at the Medibank International in Sydney. He defeated José Acasuso of Argentina in the first round and defeated the number 2 seed Tomáš Berdych in the second round. He faced Mardy Fish in the quarter-finals and lost. He then lost to defending champion Rafael Nadal in the first round of the Australian Open. He followed up his Australian season by competing in the 2010 Movistar Open where he reached the quarter-finals before losing to Juan Mónaco.

In 2010 at Wimbledon, Luczak hit a 148 mph serve, tying the Wimbledon record for fastest serve.

== Personal life ==
Luczak attended the High School Mazenod College in Mulgrave from 1992 to 1997. He is married to Swedish born nobility Anna Catarina Ericsdotter Queckfeldt, grand daughter of famous Swedish Olympic bronze medalist dressage rider, Countess Maud von Rosen. Together they have a son, Sebastian Oliver Luczak born in Sweden on 4 June 2006 and a daughter Millie born in March 2009. They live on the Mornington Peninsula in Australia. Luczak and his son play cricket at the Tyabb Cricket Club, where in his first season of competitive cricket, Peter won a bowling award for Tyabb's 6th XI.

Luczak supports the Essendon Football Club in the Australian Football League (AFL).

== ATP career finals ==
=== Doubles: 2 (0–2) ===
Winner – Legend Grand Slam tournaments (0–0) ATP World Tour Finals (0–0) ATP World Tour Masters 1000 (0–0) ATP World Tour 500 Series (0–0) ATP World Tour 250 Series (0–2)	Titles by surface Hard (0–0) Clay (0–1) Grass (0–0) Carpet (0–0)

Result	W-L	Date	Tournament	Surface	Partner	Opponents	Score
Loss	1.	Feb 2008	Buenos Aires, Argentina	Clay	(Austria) Werner Eschauer	(Argentina) Agustín Calleri (Peru) Luis Horna	0–6, 7–6^{(8–6)}, [10–2]
Loss	2.	Feb 2010	Buenos Aires, Argentina	Clay	(Germany) Simon Greul	(Argentina) Sebastián Prieto (Argentina) Horacio Zeballos	7–6^{(7–4)}, 6–3

== Futures and Challenger Singles titles (16) ==
Legend (singles)
Challengers (12)
Futures (4)

No.	Date	Tournament	Surface	Opponent	Score
1.	18 June 2001	Redding	Hard	(Japan) Yaoki Ishii	7–5, 2–6, 6–3
2.	16 July 2001	Kansas City	Hard	(Australia) Matthew Breen	6–2, 6–4
3.	6 August 2001	Godfrey	Hard	(South Africa) Raven Klaasen	6–3, 6–7, 7–5
4.	12 November 2001	Barmera	Grass	(Republic of Ireland) Peter Clarke	6–4, 1–6, 6–4
5.	8 July 2002	Granby	Hard	(United States) Alex Bogomolov Jr.	6–3, 7–6
6.	29 March 2004	Canberra	Clay	(Argentina) Juan Pablo Brzezicki	6–2, 6–1
7.	10 May 2004	Košice	Clay	(Serbia) Janko Tipsarević	7–5, 7–5
8.	31 October 2005	Caloundra	Hard	(Australia) Alun Jones	7–5, 7–6
9.	26 March 2007	Fes	Clay	(Kazakhstan) Yuri Schukin	6–2, 6–7, 7–6
10.	7 May 2007	Maspalomas	Clay	(Spain) Santiago Ventura	6–7, 6–3, 7–5
11.	4 June 2007	Furth	Clay	(Italy) Fabio Fognini	4–6, 6–2, 6–2
12.	11 June 2007	Bytom	Clay	(Italy) Simone Vagnozzi	6–3, 6–3
13.	13 October 2008	Montevideo	Clay	(Chile) Nicolás Massú	W/O
14.	7 June 2009	Furth	Clay	(Argentina) Juan Pablo Brzezicki	6–2, 6–0
15.	26 July 2009	Poznań	Clay	(Kazakhstan) Yuri Schukin	3–6, 7–6^{(7–4)}, 7–6^{(8–6)}
16.	9 August 2009	Cordenons	Clay	(Belgium) Olivier Rochus	6–3, 3–6, 6–1

== Singles performance timeline ==
Key
W	F	SF	QF	#R	RR	Q#	DNQ	A	NH

(W) winner; (F) finalist; (SF) semifinalist; (QF) quarterfinalist; (#R) rounds 4, 3, 2, 1; (RR) round-robin stage; (Q#) qualification round; (DNQ) did not qualify; (A) absent; (NH) not held; (SR) strike rate (events won / competed); (W–L) win–loss record.

Tournament	2003	2004	2005	2006	2007	2008	2009	2010	2011	2012	W–L
Australian Open	3R	1R	1R	3R	1R	2R	Q3	1R	1R	Q2	5–8
French Open	A	A	1R	A	1R	1R	Q2	1R	Q1	A	0–4
Wimbledon	A	A	A	A	A	A	Q2	2R	Q1	A	1–1
US Open	A	A	1R	A	1R	A	1R	1R	Q1	A	0–4
Win–loss	2–1	0–1	0–3	2–1	0–3	1–2	0–1	1–4	0–1	0–0	6–17
ATP World Tour Masters 1000
Indian Wells	Q1	A	A	Q1	A	Q1	A	1R	A	A	0–1
Miami	1R	A	Q2	1R	A	A	A	2R	A	A	1–3
Monte Carlo	1R	A	Q2	A	A	A	A	1R	Q2	A	0–2
Rome	Q2	A	A	A	A	A	A	1R	A	A	0–1
Hamburg / Madrid	Q2	A	A	A	A	A	A	A	A	A	0–0
Canada	Q2	A	Q1	A	A	A	A	A	A	A	0–0
Cincinnati	Q1	A	A	A	A	A	A	A	A	A	0–0
Stuttgart / Shanghai	A	A	A	A	A	A	A	A	A	Q1	0–0
Paris	A	A	A	A	A	A	Q1	A	A	A	0–0
