= Argentina Open =

Tennis tournament

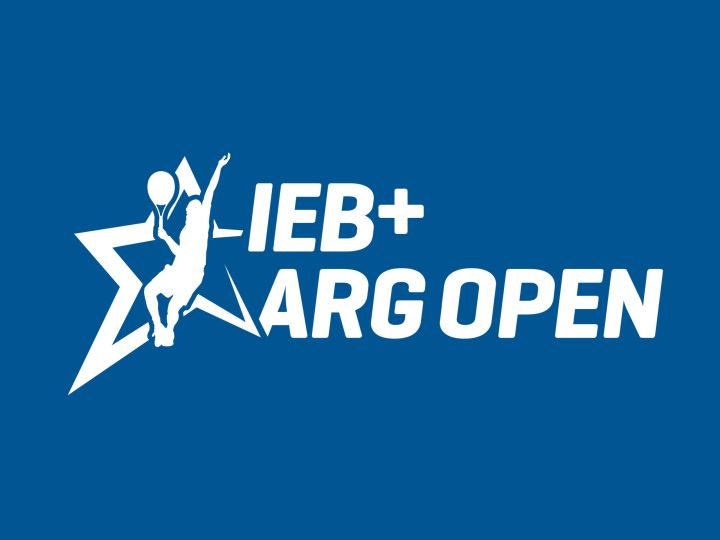

ATP Tour
- Event name: IEB+ Argentina Open
- Founded: 1927; 99 years ago
- Location: Buenos Aires, Argentina
- Venue: Buenos Aires Lawn Tennis Club
- Category: ATP Tour 250
- Surface: Clay – outdoors
- Draw: 28S / 16Q / 16D
- Prize money: US$688,985 (2025)
- Website: https://iebmasargentinaopen.com/

Current champions (2026)
- Singles: (Argentina) Francisco Cerúndolo
- Doubles: (Brazil) Orlando Luz (Brazil) Rafael Matos

The Argentina Open or Abierto Argentino is an annual ATP men's tennis event held in Buenos Aires, Argentina. The tournament is listed as an ATP 250 on the ATP Tour, and is played on outdoor clay courts at the 5,500 capacity Buenos Aires Lawn Tennis Club, in the Palermo barrio (neighborhood). Usually held in February, it includes both singles and doubles events.

The tournament was established in 1927 as the Argentina International Championships and was a combined men's and women's event from 1928 until 1987 when the women's tournament was discontinued (after 34 years the women's event resumed in 2021). Between 1970 and 1988 it was part of the Grand Prix tennis circuit and a Grand Prix Super Series event (1970–71). Between 1993 and 1995 it was part of the ATP World Series.

This event is not to be confused with the Argentine Championship (1918-1997), which was the open national championships of Argentina held at the Tennis Club Argentino (founded 1913) also in Buenos Aires.

== History ==
The tournament is presented by the City of Buenos Aires. Previously the event was known by different names such as Argentina International Championships (1927–1967), South American Open (1968–1974), ATP Buenos Aires (1978–80, 1993–95), Copa AT&T and Copa Telmex. The original tournament was founded as a combined men's and women's championship from 1928 until 1987.

For the years 1946-1951, 1955, 1957-1967 this tournament also carried the joint denomination of South American Championships. For the years 1968-1971, 1973-1981 it carried the joint denomination of South American Open Championships or South American Open. Since 2001, it has been listed in the ATP Tour 250 category (called ATP International Series category until 2009).

Renowned players, including former world No. 1s such as Spaniards Rafael Nadal, a 14-time Roland Garros champion, Carlos Alcaraz, and Carlos Moyá, as well as Brazilian Gustavo Kuerten have lifted the trophy. Other champions include Dominic Thiem, Casper Ruud, and David Ferrer, a former world No. 3 and three-time winner of the IEB+ Argentina Open.

It is also worth highlighting the local players who managed to capture the title. In the 2000s, the so-called "Argentine Legion" left its mark with victories from Gastón Gaudio (2005), Guillermo Coria (2004), and David Nalbandian (2008). Later, Juan Mónaco secured the title in both 2007 and 2012, establishing himself as one of the tournament's most successful players in the modern era. Other Argentine champions include Diego Schwartzman, who won in 2021, and Facundo Díaz Acosta in 2024. These achievements reflect Argentina's strong tennis tradition in the tournament, making it a key stage for the development of national players within the ATP circuit.

In 2025, the event became the first clay-court tournament to incorporate the Live Electronic Line Calling (ELC) system, an automated version of Hawk-Eye that replaces line judges. This technology was introduced to enhance the accuracy of officiating decisions and minimize human errors. The implementation of this system marked a significant shift in clay-court tennis, ushering in a new era where technology plays a crucial role in ensuring fair and efficient officiating.

== Stadiums ==
- Guillermo Vilas Central Court:*

This court hosts the main matches of both the qualification and final rounds. It has a seating capacity of 4,950 spectators, which can be extended to 5,750 in certain editions thanks to an auxiliary stand with space for 800 additional spectators.

- Stadium 2:*

This venue hosts medium-attendance matches, with the primary goal of optimizing the schedule by allowing multiple games to take place simultaneously and preventing tournament delays. This enhances the event's flow and provides more opportunities for players. It features two tubular stands positioned along the sidelines, accommodating up to 600 spectators.

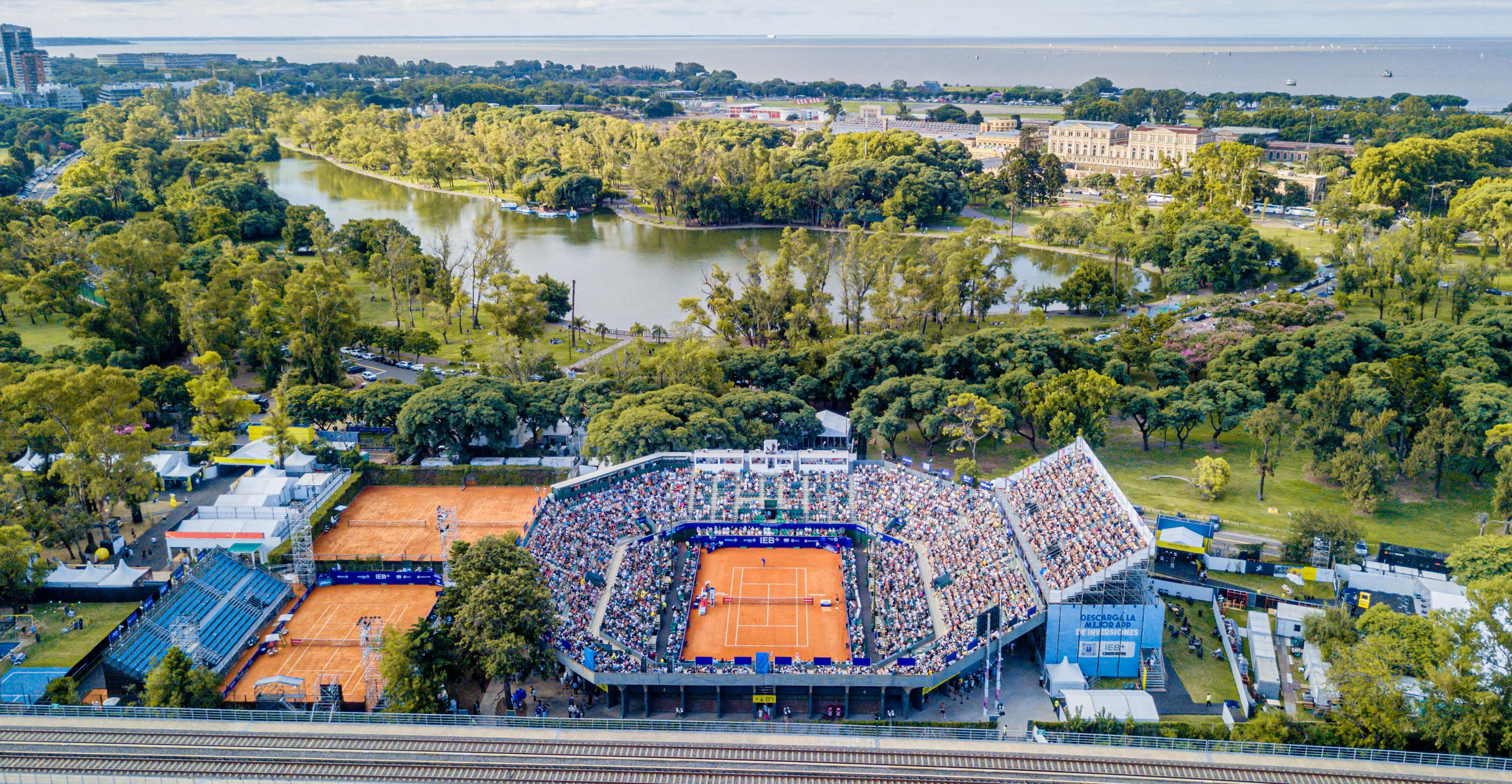
Buenos Aires Lawn Tennis Club (2025)

== Finals ==
=== Singles ===
Year	Champions	Runners-up	Score
1927	(Argentina) Juan Carlos Morea	(Argentina) Héctor Cattaruzza	6–3, 6–3, 4–6, 7–5.
1928	(Argentina) Ronaldo Boyd	(Argentina) Juan Carlos Morea	6–4, 3–6, 6–1, 6–1.
1930	(United Kingdom) Fred Perry	(United Kingdom) Eric Peters	6–4, 6–1, 6–0.
1931	(Argentina) Ronaldo Boyd	(Argentina) Lucilo Del Castillo	11–9, 6–4, 6–2.
1932	(Argentina) Guillermo Robson	(Argentina) Adriano Zappa	6–1, 6–2, 6–3.
1933	(Argentina) Guillermo Robson (2)	(Argentina) Adriano Zappa	6–0, 6–3, 6–3.
1934	(Argentina) Guillermo Robson (3)	(Argentina) Lucilo Del Castillo	6–1, 6–1, 4–6, 3–6, 6–4.
1935	(Italy) Giorgio de Stefani	(Argentina) Lucilo Del Castillo	10–8, 10–8, 6–1.
1937	(Brazil) Alcides Procópio	(Argentina) Héctor Cattaruzza	9–11, 6–3, 6–1, 6–3.
1938	(Socialist Federal Republic of Yugoslavia) Franjo Punčec	(Socialist Federal Republic of Yugoslavia) Josip Palada	2–6, 6–4, 7–5, 6–0.
1939	(Argentina) Alejo Russell	(Ecuador) Pancho Segura	2–6, 6–3, 4–6, 6–4, 6–1.
1940	(United States) Don McNeill	(United States) Elwood Cooke	8–6, 4–6, 6–0, 6–3.
1941	(United States) Don McNeill (2)	(United States) Jack Kramer	6–3, 8–6, 0–6, 7–9, 7–5.
1942	(United States) Don McNeill (3)	(Chile) Andrés Hammersley	6–3, 4–6, 6–2, 8–6.
1943	(United States) Don McNeill (4)	(Ecuador) Pancho Segura	6–4, 6–1, 5–7, 6–3.
1944	(Argentina) Enrique Morea	(Argentina) Heraldo Weiss	6–2, 8–6, 2–6, 1–6, 6–3.
1945	men's event not held		
1946	(United States) Bob Falkenburg	(Argentina) Enrique Morea	6–4, 5–7, 6–4, 3–6, 7–5.
1947	(United States) Frank Parker	(Argentina) Enrique Morea	6–2, 6–4, 6–2.
1948	(South Africa) Eric Sturgess	(United States) Vic Seixas	6–1, 3–6, 6–3, 6–4.
1949	(Argentina) Enrique Morea (2)	(United States) Tom Brown	7–5, 6–3, 6–2.
1950	(Argentina) Enrique Morea (3)	(Chile) Ricardo Balbiers	4–6, 3–6, 6–2, 6–1, 6–2.
1951	(Argentina) Enrique Morea (4)	(Italy) Fausto Gardini	6–3, 6–1, 6–3.
1952	(Egypt) Jaroslav Drobný	(Argentina) Enrique Morea	6–8, 6–1, 6–0, 6–2.
1953	(Argentina) Ernesto Della Paolera	(Argentina) Eduardo Prado	6–2, 6–1, 3–2, AB..
1954	(Argentina) Enrique Morea (5)	(Czechoslovakia) Jaroslav Drobný	2–6, 6–3, 6–3, 6–0.
1955	(Chile) Luis Ayala	(United States) Art Larsen	6–2, 6–4, 0–6, 6–0.
1956	(Argentina) Enrique Morea (6)	(Sweden) Ulf Schmidt	6–2, 6–1, 6–2.
1957	(Chile) Luis Ayala (2)	(Argentina) Enrique Morea	6–8, 6–4, 6–2, 6–2
1958	(Mexico) Mario Llamas	(Argentina) Enrique Morea	6–4, 9–7, 1–6, 2–6, 6–4.
1959	(Spain) Manuel Santana	(Chile) Luis Ayala	6–2, 7–5, 2–6, 9–7.
1960	(Chile) Luis Ayala (3)	(Spain) Manuel Santana	6–3, 3–6, 6–3, 7–5, 8–6.
1961	(France) Pierre Darmon	(Argentina) Enrique Morea	6–1, 6–1, 6–1.
1962	(Sweden) Jan-Erik Lundqvist	(Chile) Patricio Rodríguez	2–6, 6–4, 7–5, 2–6, 6–3.
1963	(Italy) Nicola Pietrangeli	(Brazil) Ronald Barnes	6–2, 4–6, 6–4, 6–3.
1964	(United States) Chuck McKinley	(Spain) Manuel Santana	6–4, 1–6, 4–6, 6–3, 4–5, retd.
1965	(Italy) Nicola Pietrangeli (2)	(South Africa) Cliff Drysdale	6–8, 6–4, 6–0, 1–6, 7–5
1966	(United States) Cliff Richey	(Brazil) Thomaz Koch	6–3, 6–2, 2–6, 6–0.
1967	(United States) Cliff Richey (2)	(Brazil) José Edison Mandarino	7–5, 6–8, 6–3, 6–3.
↓ Open Era ↓
1968	(Australia) Roy Emerson	(Australia) Rod Laver	9–7, 6–4, 6–4.
1969	(France) François Jauffret	(Socialist Federal Republic of Yugoslavia) Željko Franulović	3–6, 6–2, 6–4, 6–3
1970	(Socialist Federal Republic of Yugoslavia) Željko Franulović	(Spain) Manuel Orantes	6–4, 6–2, 6–0.
1971	(Socialist Federal Republic of Yugoslavia) Željko Franulović (2)	(Romania) Ilie Năstase	6–3, 7–6, 6–1.
1972	(West Germany) Karl Meiler	(Argentina) Guillermo Vilas	6–7, 2–6, 6–4, 6–4, 6–4.
1973	(Argentina) Guillermo Vilas	(Sweden) Björn Borg	3–6, 6–7, 6–4, 6–6 retd.
1974	(Argentina) Guillermo Vilas (2)	(Spain) Manuel Orantes	6–3, 0–6, 7–5, 6–2.
1975	(Argentina) Guillermo Vilas (3)	(Italy) Adriano Panatta	6–1, 6–4, 6–4.
1976	(Argentina) Guillermo Vilas (4)	(Chile) Jaime Fillol	6–2, 6–2, 6–3.
1977^{A}	(Argentina) Guillermo Vilas (5)	(Poland) Wojciech Fibak	6–4, 6–3, 6–0.
1977^{N}	(Argentina) Guillermo Vilas (6)	(Chile) Jaime Fillol	6–2, 7–5, 3–6, 6–3.
1978	(Argentina) José Luis Clerc	(Paraguay) Víctor Pecci	6–4, 6–4
1979	(Argentina) Guillermo Vilas (7)	(Argentina) José Luis Clerc	6–1, 6–2, 6–1
1980	(Argentina) José Luis Clerc (2)	(Germany) Rolf Gehring	6–7, 2–6, 7–5, 6–0, 6–3
1981	(Czechoslovakia) Ivan Lendl	(Argentina) Guillermo Vilas	6–2, 6–2
1982	(Argentina) Guillermo Vilas (8)	(Argentina) Alejandro Ganzábal	6–2, 6–4
1983–1984	men's event not held		
1985	(Argentina) Martín Jaite	(Uruguay) Diego Pérez	6–4, 6–2
1986	(United States) Jay Berger	(Argentina) Franco Davín	6–3, 6–3
1987	(Argentina) Guillermo Pérez Roldán	(United States) Jay Berger	3–2 retired
1988	(Spain) Javier Sánchez	(Argentina) Guillermo Pérez Roldán	6–2, 7–6
1989–1992	men's event not held		
1993	(Spain) Carlos Costa	(Spain) Alberto Berasategui	3–6, 6–1, 6–4
1994	(Spain) Àlex Corretja	(Argentina) Javier Frana	6–3, 5–7, 7–6^{(7–3)}
1995	(Spain) Carlos Moyá	(Spain) Félix Mantilla	6–0, 6–3
1996	men's event not held		
1997–2000	Buenos Aires Challenger		
2001	(Brazil) Gustavo Kuerten	(Argentina) José Acasuso	6–1, 6–3
2002	(Chile) Nicolás Massú	(Argentina) Agustín Calleri	2–6, 7–6^{(7–5)}, 6–2
2003	(Spain) Carlos Moyá (2)	(Argentina) Guillermo Coria	6–3, 4–6, 6–4
2004	(Argentina) Guillermo Coria	(Spain) Carlos Moyá	6–4, 6–1
2005	(Argentina) Gastón Gaudio	(Argentina) Mariano Puerta	6–4, 6–4
2006	(Spain) Carlos Moyá (3)	(Italy) Filippo Volandri	7–6^{(8–6)}, 6–4
2007	(Argentina) Juan Mónaco	(Italy) Alessio di Mauro	6–1, 6–2
2008	(Argentina) David Nalbandian	(Argentina) José Acasuso	3–6, 7–6^{(7–5)}, 6–4
2009	(Spain) Tommy Robredo	(Argentina) Juan Mónaco	7–5, 2–6, 7–6^{(7–5)}
2010	(Spain) Juan Carlos Ferrero	(Spain) David Ferrer	5–7, 6–4, 6–3
2011	(Spain) Nicolás Almagro	(Argentina) Juan Ignacio Chela	6–3, 3–6, 6–4
2012	(Spain) David Ferrer	(Spain) Nicolás Almagro	4–6, 6–3, 6–2
2013	(Spain) David Ferrer (2)	(Switzerland) Stan Wawrinka	6–4, 3–6, 6–1
2014	(Spain) David Ferrer (3)	(Italy) Fabio Fognini	6–4, 6–3
2015	(Spain) Rafael Nadal	(Argentina) Juan Mónaco	6–4, 6–1
2016	(Austria) Dominic Thiem	(Spain) Nicolás Almagro	7–6^{(7–2)}, 3–6, 7–6^{(7–4)}
2017	(Ukraine) Alexandr Dolgopolov	(Japan) Kei Nishikori	7–6^{(7–4)}, 6–4
2018	(Austria) Dominic Thiem (2)	(Slovenia) Aljaž Bedene	6–2, 6–4
2019	(Italy) Marco Cecchinato	(Argentina) Diego Schwartzman	6–1, 6–2
2020	(Norway) Casper Ruud	(Portugal) Pedro Sousa	6–1, 6–4
2021	(Argentina) Diego Schwartzman	(Argentina) Francisco Cerúndolo	6–1, 6–2
2022	(Norway) Casper Ruud (2)	(Argentina) Diego Schwartzman	5–7, 6–2, 6–3
2023	(Spain) Carlos Alcaraz	(United Kingdom) Cameron Norrie	6–3, 7–5
2024	(Argentina) Facundo Díaz Acosta	(Chile) Nicolás Jarry	6–3, 6–4
2025	(Brazil) João Fonseca	(Argentina) Francisco Cerúndolo	6–4, 7–6^{(7–1)}
2026	(Argentina) Francisco Cerúndolo	(Italy) Luciano Darderi	6–4, 6–2

=== Doubles ===
Year	Champions	Runners-up	Score
1968	(Spain) Andrés Gimeno (Australia) Fred Stolle	(Australia) Rod Laver (Australia) Roy Emerson	6–3, 4–6, 7–5, 6–1
1969	(Chile) Patricio Cornejo (Chile) Jaime Fillol	(Australia) Roy Emerson (South Africa) Frew McMillan	W/O
1970	(Australia) Bob Carmichael (Australia) Ray Ruffels	(Socialist Federal Republic of Yugoslavia) Željko Franulović (Czechoslovakia) Jan Kodeš	7–5, 6–2, 5–7, 6–7, 6–3
1971	(Socialist Federal Republic of Yugoslavia) Željko Franulović (Romania) Ilie Năstase	(Chile) Patricio Cornejo (Chile) Jaime Fillol	6–4, 6–4
1972	(Chile) Jaime Fillol (2) (Chile) Jaime Pinto-Bravo	(Australia) Barry Phillips-Moore (Colombia) Iván Molina	2–6, 7–6, 6–2
1973	(Argentina) Ricardo Cano (Argentina) Guillermo Vilas	(Chile) Patricio Cornejo (Colombia) Iván Molina	7–6, 6–3
1974	(Spain) Manuel Orantes (Argentina) Guillermo Vilas (2)	(United States) Clark Graebner (Brazil) Thomaz Koch	6–4, 6–3
1975	(Italy) Paolo Bertolucci (Italy) Adriano Panatta	(West Germany) Jürgen Fassbender (West Germany) Hans-Jürgen Pohmann	7–6, 6–7, 6–4
1976	(Brazil) Carlos Kirmayr (Argentina) Tito Vázquez	(Argentina) Ricardo Cano (Chile) Belus Prajoux	6–4, 7–5
1977	(Romania) Ion Țiriac (Argentina) Guillermo Vilas (3)	(Argentina) Ricardo Cano (Spain) Antonio Muñoz	6–4, 6–0
1978	(New Zealand) Chris Lewis (United States) Van Winitsky	(Argentina) José Luis Clerc (Chile) Belus Prajoux	6–4, 3–6, 6–0
1979	(Czechoslovakia) Tomáš Šmíd (United States) Sherwood Stewart	(Brazil) Marcos Hocevar (Brazil) João Soares	6–1, 7–5
1980	(Chile) Hans Gildemeister (Ecuador) Andrés Gómez	(Spain) Ángel Giménez (Colombia) Jairo Velasco Sr.	6–4, 7–5
1981	(Brazil) Marcos Hocevar (Brazil) João Soares	(Chile) Álvaro Fillol (Chile) Jaime Fillol	7–6, 6–7, 6–4
1982	(Austria) Hans Kary (Hungary) Zoltán Kuharszky	(Spain) Ángel Giménez (Spain) Manuel Orantes	7–5, 6–2
1983–1984	Not Held		
1985	(Argentina) Martín Jaite (Argentina) Christian Miniussi	(Argentina) Eduardo Bengoechea (Uruguay) Diego Pérez	6–4, 6–3
1986	(France) Loïc Courteau (Austria) Horst Skoff	(Argentina) Gustavo Luza (Argentina) Gustavo Tiberti	3–6, 6–4, 6–3
1987	(Spain) Sergio Casal (Spain) Tomás Carbonell	(United States) Jay Berger (Argentina) Horacio De La Peña	W/O
1988	(Spain) Carlos Costa (Spain) Javier Sánchez	(Argentina) Eduardo Bengoechea (Argentina) José Luis Clerc	6–3, 3–6, 6–3
1989–1992	Not Held		
1993	(Spain) Tomás Carbonell (2) (Spain) Carlos Costa (2)	(Spain) Sergio Casal (Spain) Emilio Sánchez	6–4, 6–4
1994	(Spain) Sergio Casal (2) (Spain) Emilio Sánchez	(Spain) Tomás Carbonell (Spain) Francisco Roig	6–3, 6–2
1995	(United States) Vince Spadea (South Africa) Christo van Rensburg	(Czech Republic) Jiří Novák (Czech Republic) David Rikl	6–3, 6–3
1996–2000	Buenos Aires Challenger		
2001	(Argentina) Lucas Arnold Ker (Spain) Tomás Carbonell (3)	(Argentina) Mariano Hood (Argentina) Sebastián Prieto	5–7, 7–5, 7–6^{(7–5)}
2002	(Argentina) Gastón Etlis (Argentina) Martín Rodríguez	(Sweden) Simon Aspelin (Australia) Andrew Kratzmann	3–6, 6–3, [10–4]
2003	(Argentina) Mariano Hood (Argentina) Sebastián Prieto	(Argentina) Lucas Arnold (Argentina) David Nalbandian	6–2, 6–2
2004	(Argentina) Lucas Arnold Ker (2) (Argentina) Mariano Hood (2)	(Argentina) Federico Browne (Argentina) Diego Veronelli	7–5, 6–7^{(2–7)}, 6–4
2005	(Czech Republic) František Čermák (Czech Republic) Leoš Friedl	(Argentina) José Acasuso (Argentina) Sebastián Prieto	6–2, 7–5
2006	(Czech Republic) František Čermák (2) (Czech Republic) Leoš Friedl (2)	(Greece) Vasilis Mazarakis (Serbia) Boris Pašanski	6–1, 6–2
2007	(Argentina) Sebastián Prieto (2) (Argentina) Martín García	(Spain) Rubén Ramírez Hidalgo (Spain) Albert Montañés	6–4, 6–2
2008	(Argentina) Agustín Calleri (Peru) Luis Horna	(Austria) Werner Eschauer (Australia) Peter Luczak	6–0, 6–7^{(6–8)}, [10–2]
2009	(Spain) Marcel Granollers (Spain) Alberto Martín	(Spain) Nicolás Almagro (Spain) Santiago Ventura	6–3, 5–7, [10–8]
2010	(Argentina) Sebastián Prieto (3) (Argentina) Horacio Zeballos	(Germany) Simon Greul (Australia) Peter Luczak	7–6^{(7–4)}, 6–3
2011	(Austria) Oliver Marach (Argentina) Leonardo Mayer	(Brazil) Franco Ferreiro (Brazil) André Sá	7–6^{(8–6)}, 6–3
2012	(Spain) David Marrero (Spain) Fernando Verdasco	(Slovakia) Michal Mertiňák (Brazil) André Sá	6–4, 6–4
2013	(Italy) Simone Bolelli (Italy) Fabio Fognini	(United States) Nicholas Monroe (Germany) Simon Stadler	6–3, 6–2
2014	(Spain) Marcel Granollers (2) (Spain) Marc López	(Uruguay) Pablo Cuevas (Argentina) Horacio Zeballos	7–5, 6–4
2015	(Finland) Jarkko Nieminen (Brazil) André Sá	(Spain) Pablo Andújar (Austria) Oliver Marach	4–6, 6–4, [10–7]
2016	(Colombia) Juan Sebastián Cabal (Colombia) Robert Farah	(Spain) Íñigo Cervantes (Italy) Paolo Lorenzi	6–3, 6–0
2017	(Colombia) Juan Sebastián Cabal (2) (Colombia) Robert Farah (2)	(Mexico) Santiago González (Spain) David Marrero	6–1, 6–4
2018	(Argentina) Andrés Molteni (Argentina) Horacio Zeballos (2)	(Colombia) Juan Sebastián Cabal (Colombia) Robert Farah	6–3, 5–7, [10–3]
2019	(Argentina) Máximo González (Argentina) Horacio Zeballos (3)	(Argentina) Diego Schwartzman (Austria) Dominic Thiem	6–1, 6–1
2020	(Spain) Marcel Granollers (3) (Argentina) Horacio Zeballos (4)	(Argentina) Guillermo Durán (Argentina) Juan Ignacio Londero	6–4, 5–7, [18–16]
2021	(Bosnia and Herzegovina) Tomislav Brkić (Serbia) Nikola Ćaćić	(Uruguay) Ariel Behar (Ecuador) Gonzalo Escobar	6–3, 7–5
2022	(Mexico) Santiago González (Argentina) Andrés Molteni (2)	(Argentina) Horacio Zeballos (Italy) Fabio Fognini	6–1, 6–1
2023	(Italy) Simone Bolelli (2) (Italy) Fabio Fognini (2)	(Colombia) Nicolás Barrientos (Uruguay) Ariel Behar	6–2, 6–4
2024	(Italy) Simone Bolelli (3) (Italy) Andrea Vavassori	(Spain) Marcel Granollers (Argentina) Horacio Zeballos	6–2, 7–6^{(8–6)}
2025	(Argentina) Guido Andreozzi (France) Théo Arribagé	(Brazil) Rafael Matos (Brazil) Marcelo Melo	7–5, 4–6, [10–7]
2026	(Brazil) Orlando Luz (Brazil) Rafael Matos	(Argentina) Andrea Collarini (Argentina) Nicolás Kicker	7–5, 6–3

== Media coverage ==
=== Television ===
In Argentina, Latin America and the United States the ATP from Buenos Aires is broadcast Live and Exclusive on TyC Sports in Pay TV (cable and satellite).

== See also ==
- WTA Argentine Open - women's tournament
