= Nicolás Almagro =

Spanish tennis player (born 1985)

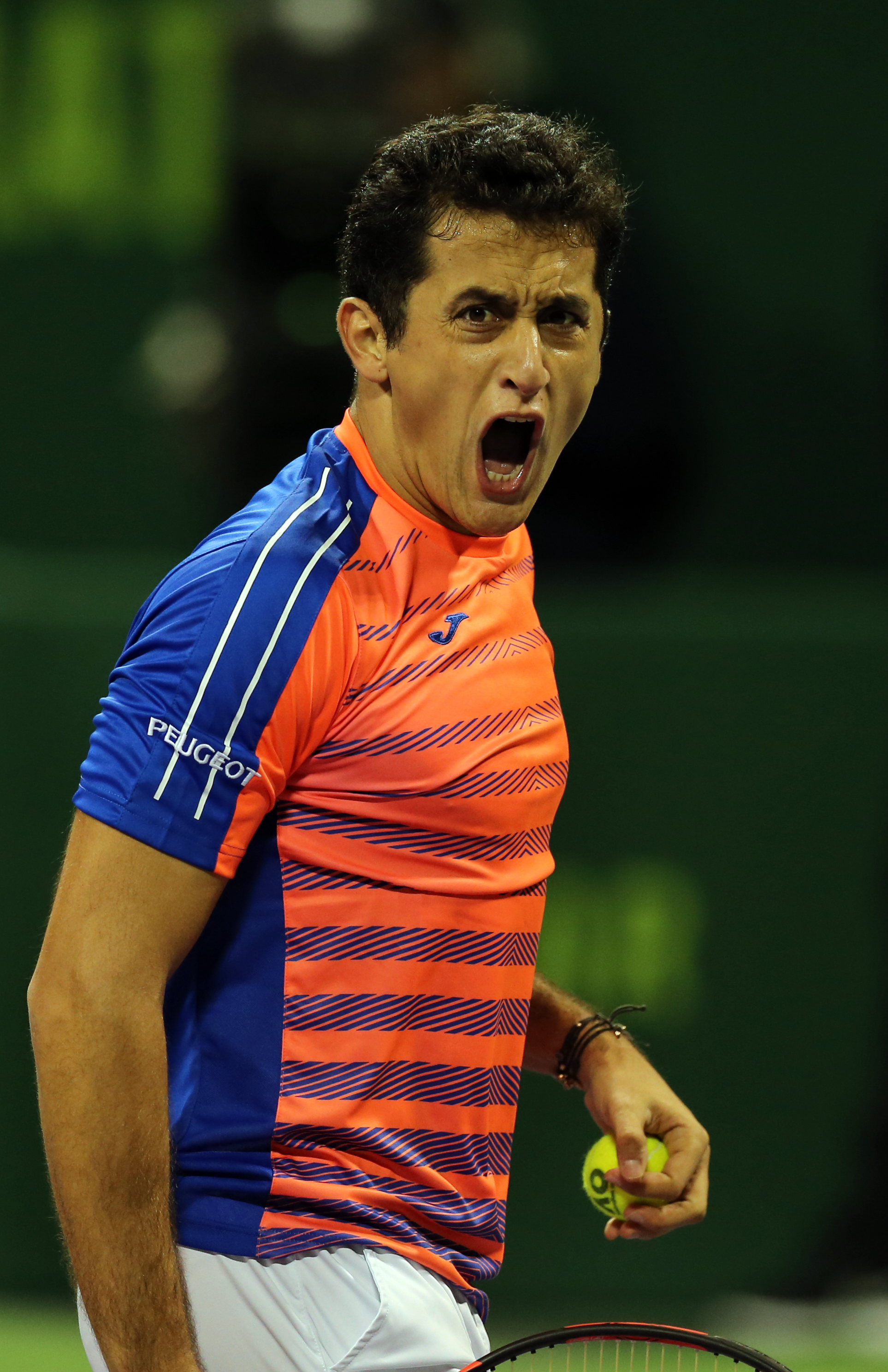
- Almagro in January 2017
- Country (sports): Spain
- Residence: Murcia, Spain
- Born: 21 August 1985 (age 41) Murcia
- Height: 1.83 m (6 ft 0 in)
- Turned pro: 2003
- Retired: April 2019
- Plays: Right-handed (one-handed backhand)
- Prize money: US$10,752,234

Singles
- Career record: 397–278 (58.8%) (in Grand Slam and ATP World Tour main draw matches, and in Davis Cup)
- Career titles: 13
- Highest ranking: No. 9 (2 May 2011)

Grand Slam singles results
- Australian Open: QF (2013)
- French Open: QF (2008, 2010, 2012)
- Wimbledon: 3R (2009, 2011, 2012, 2013)
- US Open: 4R (2012)

Other tournaments
- Tour Finals: Alt (2011, 2012)
- Olympic Games: QF (2012)

Doubles
- Career record: 77–120
- Career titles: 1
- Highest ranking: No. 48 (21 March 2011)

Grand Slam doubles results
- Australian Open: 2R (2008)
- French Open: 3R (2010)
- Wimbledon: 1R (2006, 2007, 2010, 2015, 2016)
- US Open: 3R (2016)

Team competitions
- Davis Cup: W (2008)

Nicolás Almagro
Medal record

Representing Spain

Men's Tennis

Mediterranean Games
Gold medal – first place	2005 Almería	Singles
Gold medal – first place	2005 Almería	Doubles

Nicolás Almagro Sánchez (Spanish pronunciation: [nikoˈlas alˈmaɣɾo ˈsantʃeθ]; born 21 August 1985 in Murcia, Spain) is a Spanish former professional tennis player. He reached the quarterfinals of the French Open in 2008, 2010 and 2012 (losing each time to Rafael Nadal, the eventual champion in each occasion), as well as the quarterfinals of the Australian Open in 2013 (losing to David Ferrer after leading by two sets to love).

Over his career, Almagro won thirteen singles titles, and he achieved a career-high singles ranking of world No. 9 in May 2011. Following his retirement, Almagro began coaching American player Danielle Collins.

== Personal life ==
Almagro married Rafi Lardín on 6 December 2015. They welcomed their first child, a boy, in 2017.

== Career ==
=== Juniors ===
Almagro reached as high as world No. 18 in the junior singles rankings in December 2003.

=== 2005 ===
Almagro won the gold medal at the 2005 Mediterranean Games by defeating compatriot Guillermo García López in the final in Almería, Spain.

=== 2006 ===
In April 2006, Almagro won his maiden ATP tournament title, the Open de Tenis Comunidad Valenciana (Valencia, Spain). Almagro was forced to come through the qualification rounds just to make this event, but that did not stop him from winning eight matches in a row, including three-set victories over former world number ones Juan Carlos Ferrero and Marat Safin.

After Valencia, Almagro went on an excellent run, reaching the semifinals of the Barcelona Open, before losing to Rafael Nadal, and followed that up by reaching the quarterfinals in Rome, where he lost to Roger Federer in three tight sets, 7–5 in the third round.

At Roland Garros 2006, he suffered a disappointing second-round loss to James Blake. The remainder of 2006 was uninspiring for Almagro. He did show signs of improving his hardcourt game by making a quarterfinal indoors in Lyon, and he also won matches at the Masters 1000 events in Cincinnati and Paris.

=== 2007 ===
Almagro won his second title on 15 April 2007 by defeating Potito Starace, 4–6, 6–2, 6–1, in Valencia for the second consecutive year. However, he lost in the second round of the French Open in five sets to Michaël Llodra, in what was perceived as another disappointing lapse in form. Still, his year contained highlights other than Valencia. He reached the semifinals of Buenos Aires, the finals of Båstad, and began to show promise on hard courts also, advancing to the quarterfinals of the Masters 1000 event in Cincinnati and the third round of the US Open (losing to Davydenko).

=== 2008 ===
In 2008, Almagro won the third title of his career in Costa do Sauipe by defeating Carlos Moyá in a rollercoaster three-set battle. Two weeks later, Almagro followed that victory up with yet another in Acapulco, defeating David Nalbandian in the finals, 6–1, 7–6. With his fourth career title, Almagro rose to a career-best ranking of No. 21 in the world, winning 21 of 26 matches on clay in the season. He was at a career-best ranking of No. 17 in the world following the Masters Series in Rome.

He achieved his best Grand Slam result in June by reaching the quarterfinals of the 2008 French Open, where he lost to Rafael Nadal, 1–6, 1–6, 1–6. During his run, he beat Boris Pašanski, Sebastián Decoud, tenth seed Andy Murray, and home-favourite Jérémy Chardy in straight sets. He hit more aces than any other player in the French Open that year (78).

=== 2009 ===
In January, Almagro participated in the 2009 Heineken Open, held in Auckland, New Zealand. The fourth seed at the event, Almagro received a bye into the second round, where he defeated Lu Yen-hsun of Taiwan in three sets. This gained him entry into the quarterfinals, where he was defeated in straight sets by American Sam Querrey, sixth seed at the event.

At the Australian Open, Almagro won in the first round of the tournament for the first time, making it to the third round before losing to Gaël Monfils. At the 2009 Brasil Open, where Almagro was the defending champion and top seed, he lost in the quarterfinals to Frederico Gil in two tiebreak sets, 6–7, 6–7. At the Abierto Mexicano, Almagro successfully defended his 2008 win, defeating Monfils in the final, 6–4, 6–4.

Almagro's next tournament was the 2009 Sony Ericsson Open, an ATP Masters Series event where he was seeded 19th. After receiving a bye into the second round, he was defeated by Taylor Dent in a third-set tiebreak.

At the French Open, he made it through to the third round, but lost to countryman, Fernando Verdasco in straight sets.

At Wimbledon, he reached the third round, but was stopped easily by recent French Open runner-up Robin Söderling. In the first round, he scraped his way through after trailing 7–6, 7–6, 5–4, 40–30 with Juan Mónaco serving on match point. In the second round, he led Karol Beck two sets to love, only to find himself again fighting in five sets to survive. Nicolas won by 6–4, 7–6, 3–6, 3–6, 7–5.

At the US Open, Almagro lost in the third round to fellow Spaniard Nadal. Before this, he defeated Belgian Steve Darcis in the first round, before getting past American Robby Ginepri in a 4 hr 15 min five-set match in the second round.

In the subsequent ATP Masters 1000 tournament in Paris, Almagro once again fell to Nadal. Despite having five match points and the opportunity to serve for the match in the third set, Almagro lost, 6–3, 6–7, 5–7.

=== 2010 ===
At the 2010 Australian Open, Almagro prevailed in long five-set matches to beat Xavier Malisse, (8–6 in the fifth set) and Benjamin Becker, (6–3 in the fifth set) in the first two rounds. In the third round, he beat Alejandro Falla with relative ease in three sets. In the fourth round, he was defeated by Jo-Wilfried Tsonga in another five-set battle lasting over 4 hours. Almagro played the whole tournament with a broken left wrist, preventing him from exceeding 200 km/h when serving due to an altered ball-toss.

He was ousted in the opening round of the 2010 Copa Telmex tournament for the second straight year (losing to Gimeno Traver). He then entered the Abierto Mexicano in Acapulco as the two-time defending champion. He beat Dudi Sela and Richard Gasquet to reach the quarterfinals. However, he lost to in-form Juan Carlos Ferrero, 1–6, 7–5, 2–6, who was on a 12-match winning streak.

As for his performances in ATP Masters 1000 tournaments, in Indian Wells Masters 1000, he reached the fourth round before retiring hurt against Andy Murray. At the Miami Masters 1000, he lost to eventual champion Andy Roddick in the quarterfinals. In the Monte Carlo Rolex Masters 1000, he beat Simon Greul before falling to Jo-Wilfried Tsonga in the second round. In the Rome Masters 1000, he beat Łukasz Kubot, but lost to Ivan Ljubičić in the second round. In the Madrid Masters 1000, he beat Victor Troicki, fourth seed Söderling, Mónaco, and Melzer to reach the semifinals of a Masters event for the first time. There, he was beaten by the previous year's finalist Rafael Nadal, 6–4, 2–6, 2–6.

In the 2010 French Open, seeded 19th, he beat Robin Haase in five sets. In the second round, he beat Steve Darcis in straight sets. After beating Alexandr Dolgopolov in the third round, he managed to upset Fernando Verdasco in the fourth round in four sets, 6–1, 4–6, 6–1, 6–4. Almagro then bowed out in straight sets in the quarterfinals, losing a closely contested match against eventual champion Rafael Nadal, 6–7, 6–7, 4–6.

At the 2010 Wimbledon Championships, Almagro suffered a first-round exit to Italian Andreas Seppi, 6–7, 6–7, 2–6.

After this, Almagro traveled to his first clay-court tournament since Roland Garros, the 2010 Swedish Open. He defeated Jarkko Nieminen, 6–4, 6–4, Croatian qualifier Franko Škugor, 4–6, 6–4, 6–0, in the quarterfinals. In the semifinals, he defeated fellow Spaniard Tommy Robredo, 6–1, 6–3, and then in the final he defeated home favourite, top seed, and defending champion Robin Söderling, 7–5, 3–6, 6–2, to snap a 17-month title drought dating back to February 2009 in Acapulco. Almagro then played in the 2010 International German Open, where he was stunned in the opening round by Uzbekistani Denis Istomin, 6–7, 6–7. After this, he appeared at the 2010 Allianz Suisse Open Gstaad as second seed. He won the tournament after defeating compatriot Marcel Granollers, 7–6, 3–6, 6–3, Swiss wildcard Michael Lammer, 3–6, 6–3, 6–2, Frenchman Jérémy Chardy, 6–2, 7–6, and then another fellow Spaniard Daniel Gimeno Traver, 7–6, 3–6, 6–3. In the final, he defeated Richard Gasquet, 7–5, 6–1, to clinch the title.

At the 2010 US Open, Almagro beat Potito Starace and Guillermo García López, both in four sets, before losing to Sam Querrey in the third round in straight sets, 3–6, 4–6, 4–6.

=== 2011 ===
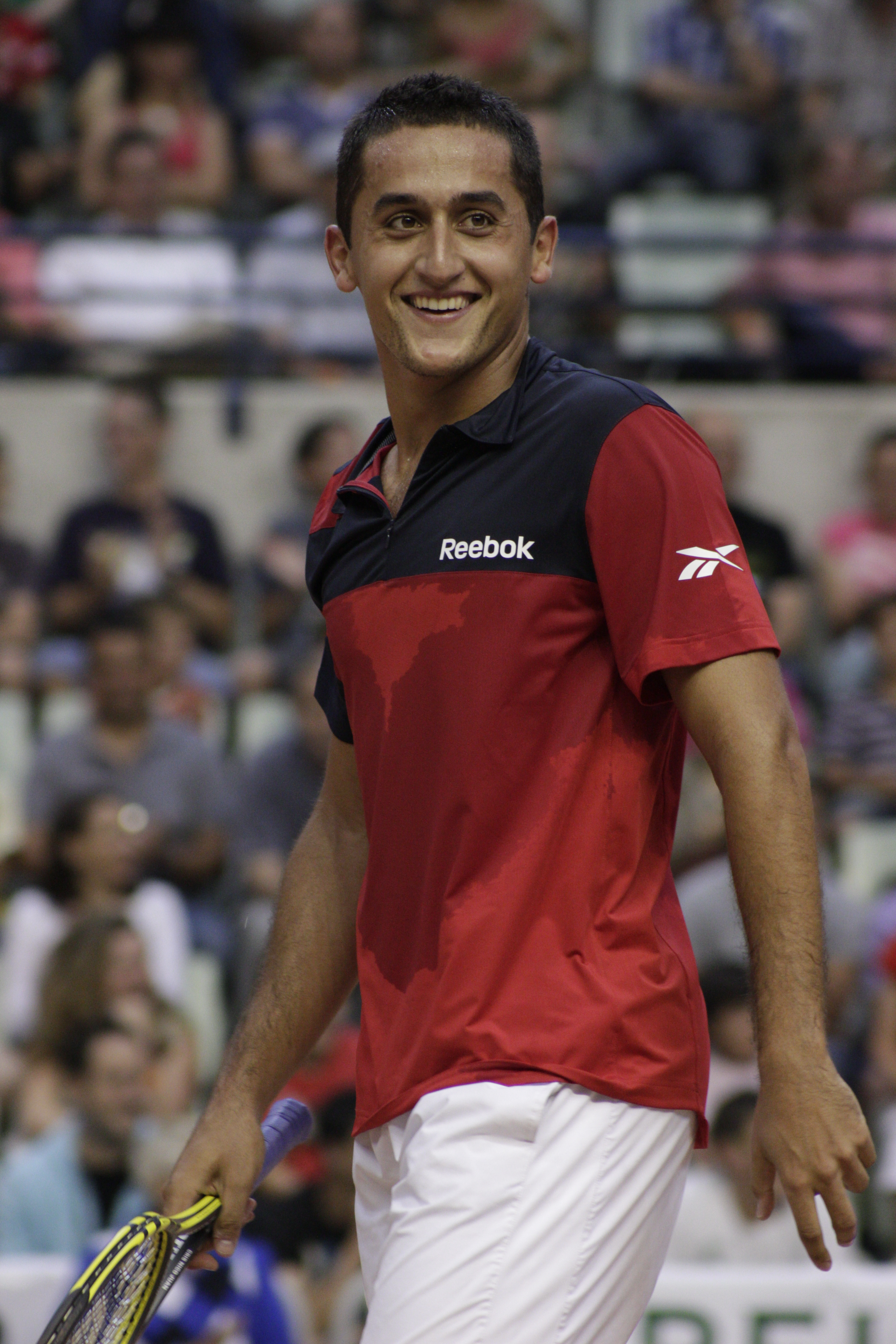
Almagro in June 2011

Almagro began his year at the 2011 Heineken Open in New Zealand. Seeded second, he received a bye into the second round. In his first match, he beat Victor Hănescu, 6–4, 7–6, to advance to the quarterfinals, where he won against Adrian Mannarino, 7–6, 6–7, 6–2, to advance to the semifinals, where he was defeated by David Nalbandian, 6–4, 6–2.

At the Australian Open, Almagro was seeded 14th. He defeated Stéphane Robert in the first round, 6–4, 6–3, 6–7, 7–5. He then battled through Igor Andreev in the second round, 7–5, 2–6, 4–6, 7–6, 7–5, saving three match points in the process and rallying from a 2–4 deficit in the fifth set. In the third round, he defeated 17th seed Ivan Ljubičić in straight sets, 6–4, 7–6, 6–3. In the fourth round, he was dismantled by world no. 3 and eventual champion Novak Djokovic, 3–6, 4–6, 0–6.

Almagro next entered the 2011 Brasil Open, where he had a bye in the first round. He easily cruised to the semifinals, and after a slow start, he defeated Juan Ignacio Chela, 1–6, 6–2, 6–4, to reach the final. He then won his eighth career title against Alexandr Dolgopolov, 6–3, 7–6.

His winning streak continued as he snatched his second consecutive title in as many weeks at the 2011 Copa Claro tournament in Buenos Aires, Argentina, defeating Juan Ignacio Chela, 6–3, 3–6, 6–4, in the final. His hot streak stretched even further at the 2011 Abierto Mexicano Telcel tournament in Acapulco, Mexico, making his third consecutive clay-court final. He beat Victor Hănescu, Filippo Volandri, Santiago Giraldo, and Thomaz Bellucci. He lost, however, to defending champion David Ferrer, 6–7, 7–6, 2–6.

Almagro then lost in the third round at both the Indian Wells (losing to Albert Montañés, 6–4, 2–6, 4–6) and at the Miami Open (losing to Florian Mayer, 1–6, 6–3, 1–6).

At Monte-Carlo, he beat Marcel Granollers, 6–3, 6–3, before prevailing in a marathon encounter against Máximo González, 6–7, 7–5, 7–6, saving a total of four match points (three consecutive match points when *0–40 on serve at *4–5 in the third set, and one match point in the third set tiebreak at *7–8). He then lost to Jürgen Melzer, 1–6, 4–6, in the third round.

Almagro then appeared at the 2011 Barcelona Open Banco Sabadell, where he notched a 7–5, 7–6 win over in-form compatriot Pablo Andújar. In the third round, he defeated Nikolay Davydenko, 7–6, 6–3, to enter the world's top 10 for the first time in his career. He followed this victory with a solid 6–3, 6–3 victory in the quarterfinals over a resurgent Juan Carlos Ferrero, who had just come back from a knee injury. In the semifinals, he lost to David Ferrer, 3–6, 4–6.

He lost at the Madrid Masters to Jo-Wilfried Tsonga, 1–6, 3–6, in the first round, before making it to the third round at the Rome Masters and losing 3–6, 6–3, 4–6 to Robin Söderling. Almagro improved at the Open de Nice Côte d'Azur, where he defeated Victor Hănescu, 6–7, 6–3, 6–3. In Hamburg, Almagro lost in the final, 4–6, 6–4, 4–6, to Gilles Simon.

Almagro played Julien Benneteau in the first round of the US Open, making many unforced errors and only managing to break once out of 13 chances. He lost 2–6, 4–6, 2–6.

=== 2012 ===
Almagro lost in the fourth round of the 2012 Australian Open to Tomáš Berdych. Afterwards, Berdych refused to shake Almagro's hand after an incident in the match where Almagro hit Berdych with a ball.

In February, Almagro earned his 11th career title in São Paulo, defeating Filippo Volandri in the final. He also made the final in Buenos Aires, bowing to David Ferrer.

Almagro got his revenge at Indian Wells, where he beat and bageled Berdych in the fourth round to advance to the quarterfinals, where he met Novak Djokovic.

Almagro defended his title in Nice for his 12th career title, beating American Brian Baker in the final.

At the French Open, he defeated Paolo Lorenzi, in the first round, Marcos Baghdatis in the second round, Leonardo Mayer in the third round, and Janko Tipsarević in the fourth round to reach quarterfinals without losing a set. He lost his first set to Rafael Nadal in the quarterfinals, where he ultimately lost, 6–7, 2–6, 3–6.

Almagro has yet to go past the third round at Wimbledon and is not known for his proficiency on grass. However, during the 2012 London Olympics, he made a surprising run to the quarterfinals without dropping a set, before losing 4–6, 1–6 to eventual champion Andy Murray.

Almagro reached the finals of the Swedish Open, losing again to Ferrer, 2–6, 2–6.

Almagro reached the semifinals of the German Tennis Championships in Hamburg, losing to Juan Mónaco, 6–3, 3–6, 4–6.

=== 2013 ===
Almagro reached the quarterfinals of the Australian Open for the first time, where he played compatriot David Ferrer, whom he had never beaten in twelve previous meetings. Almagro led by two sets and served for a place in his first Grand Slam semifinal once in the third set and twice in the fourth, but was unable to manufacture a match point, and Ferrer eventually won, 4–6, 4–6, 7–5, 7–6^{(4)}, 6–2. Almagro's next tournament was the Abierto Mexicano Telcel in Acapulco. He reached the semifinals without dropping a set. However, he was beaten by Rafael Nadal in straight sets.

In Houston, Almagro was the top seed. He made it to the final, but was defeated by John Isner.

Almagro then reached the fourth round of the French Open where, for the second Grand Slam running, he lost after leading by two sets and a break against a compatriot, this time Tommy Robredo. Almagro led 7–6^{(5)}, 6–3, 4–1 but went on to lose the last three sets 4–6, 4–6, 4–6, despite also leading sets four and five by a break of serve.

At Wimbledon, Almagro was the 15th seed. He reached the third round, where he lost in straight sets to Jerzy Janowicz.

Almagro reached the semifinal stage of the bet-at-home Open in Hamburg, losing to Fabio Fognini in straight sets.

=== 2014 ===
Almagro pulled out of Sydney and the Australian Open because of a shoulder injury. He reached the Houston final, where he lost to Fernando Verdasco. The Spaniard won over Nicolas Mahut to reach the third round of the Monte-Carlo Masters.

At the Barcelona Open Banc Sabadell, he defeated Martin Kližan and Fernando Verdasco, then snapped Nadal's 41-match winning streak. This marked his first victory over his dominant compatriot in 11 meetings. Santiago Giraldo defeated him in semifinals.

At Roland Garros, Nicolás was forced to retire in the first round against American Jack Sock due to a foot injury.

Almagro subsequently withdrew from both Wimbledon and the US Open due to the same injury.

=== 2015 ===
At the Australian Open, he lost to Kei Nishikori 6–4, 7–6^{(1)}, 6–2 in the first round.

=== 2019 ===
Almagro announced his retirement during the Murcia Open in April 2019, which would be his last professional tournament.

=== Playing style ===
Almagro's playing style fits that of an offensive baseliner. Almagro's groundstrokes, particularly on his favored backhand side, are very powerful. Almagro uses a very quick and compact service motion which helps his first serve often exceed speeds of 210 km/h. In addition to his powerful game, Almagro is also known for playing on the edge of his emotions, sometimes losing his temper on-court. Almagro is most proficient on clay courts, as evidenced by all his ATP finals being at clay court events. Almagro has had success on hard courts, reaching the quarterfinals of the Australian Open in 2013, and has also reached the quarterfinals in Cincinnati (2007) and Miami (2010). However, he generally prefers to play on clay courts and tailors his schedule to play the majority of the clay court events on the ATP World Tour.

=== Equipment ===
Nicolás Almagro uses the Volkl V-Sense 10 Tour. He has been stringing with Luxilon Big Banger Original for years. In January 2016 Almagro signed with Joma for clothing and shoes.

=== Davis Cup ===
He has played seven Davis Cup ties, winning 8 of the 10 singles matches he has contested. All his wins have come on clay.

In 2008, he helped the Spanish Davis Cup team to win the title, winning two rubbers at the first round against Peru by beating Matías Silva 3–6, 6–3, 7–5, 6–0 and Iván Miranda 6–2, 6 –3.

In the 2012 Davis Cup final, he lost to Tomáš Berdych and again to Radek Štěpánek in the fifth rubber, denying Spain a repeat win.

== ATP career finals ==
=== Singles: 23 (13 titles, 10 runner-ups) ===
Legend Grand Slam tournaments (0–0) ATP World Tour Finals (0–0) ATP World Tour Masters 1000 (0–0) ATP World Tour 500 Series (2–3) ATP World Tour 250 Series (11–7)	Titles by surface Hard (0–0) Clay (13–10) Grass (0–0)	Titles by setting Outdoor (13–10) Indoor (0–0)

Result	W–L	Date	Tournament	Tier	Surface	Opponent	Score
Win	1–0	Apr 2006	Valencia Open, Spain	International	Clay	(France) Gilles Simon	6–2, 6–3
Win	2–0	Apr 2007	Valencia Open, Spain (2)	International	Clay	(Italy) Potito Starace	4–6, 6–2, 6–1
Loss	2–1	Jul 2007	Swedish Open, Sweden	International	Clay	(Spain) David Ferrer	1–6, 2–6
Win	3–1	Feb 2008	Brasil Open, Brazil	International	Clay	(Spain) Carlos Moyá	7–6^{(7–4)}, 3–6, 7–5
Win	4–1	Mar 2008	Mexican Open, Mexico	Intl. Gold	Clay	(Argentina) David Nalbandian	6–1, 7–6^{(7–1)}
Loss	4–2	Apr 2008	Valencia Open, Spain	International	Clay	(Spain) David Ferrer	6–4, 2–6, 6–7^{(2–7)}
Win	5–2	Feb 2009	Mexican Open, Mexico (2)	500 Series	Clay	(France) Gaël Monfils	6–4, 6–4
Win	6–2	Jul 2010	Swedish Open, Sweden	250 Series	Clay	(Sweden) Robin Söderling	7–5, 3–6, 6–2
Win	7–2	Aug 2010	Swiss Open, Switzerland	250 Series	Clay	(France) Richard Gasquet	7–5, 6–1
Win	8–2	Feb 2011	Brasil Open, Brazil (2)	250 Series	Clay	(Ukraine) Alexandr Dolgopolov	6–3, 7–6^{(7–3)}
Win	9–2	Feb 2011	Argentina Open, Argentina	250 Series	Clay	(Argentina) Juan Ignacio Chela	6–3, 3–6, 6–4
Loss	9–3	Feb 2011	Mexican Open, Mexico	500 Series	Clay	(Spain) David Ferrer	6–7^{(4–7)}, 7–6^{(7–2)}, 2–6
Win	10–3	May 2011	Open de Nice Côte d'Azur, France	250 Series	Clay	(Romania) Victor Hănescu	6–7^{(5–7)}, 6–3, 6–3
Loss	10–4	Jul 2011	German Open, Germany	500 Series	Clay	(France) Gilles Simon	4–6, 6–4, 4–6
Win	11–4	Feb 2012	Brasil Open, Brazil (3)	250 Series	Clay	(Italy) Filippo Volandri	6–3, 4–6, 6–4
Loss	11–5	Feb 2012	Argentina Open, Argentina	250 Series	Clay	(Spain) David Ferrer	6–4, 3–6, 2–6
Win	12–5	May 2012	Open de Nice Côte d'Azur, France (2)	250 Series	Clay	(United States) Brian Baker	6–3, 6–2
Loss	12–6	Jul 2012	Swedish Open, Sweden	250 Series	Clay	(Spain) David Ferrer	2–6, 2–6
Loss	12–7	Apr 2013	U.S. Men's Clay Court Championships, US	250 Series	Clay	(United States) John Isner	3–6, 5–7
Loss	12–8	Apr 2013	Barcelona Open, Spain	500 Series	Clay	(Spain) Rafael Nadal	4–6, 3–6
Loss	12–9	Apr 2014	U.S. Men's Clay Court Championships, US	250 Series	Clay	(Spain) Fernando Verdasco	3–6, 6–7^{(4–7)}
Loss	12–10	Feb 2016	Argentina Open, Argentina	250 Series	Clay	(Austria) Dominic Thiem	6–7^{(2–7)}, 6–3, 6–7^{(4–7)}
Win	13–10	May 2016	Estoril Open, Portugal	250 Series	Clay	(Spain) Pablo Carreño Busta	6–7^{(6–8)}, 7–6^{(7–5)}, 6–3

=== Doubles: 2 (1 title, 1 runner-up) ===
Legend Grand Slam tournaments (0–0) ATP World Tour Finals (0–0) ATP World Tour Masters 1000 (0–0) ATP World Tour 500 Series (0–0) ATP World Tour 250 Series (1–1)	Titles by surface Hard (0–0) Clay (1–1) Grass (0–0)	Titles by setting Outdoor (1–1) Indoor (0–0)

Result	W–L	Date	Tournament	Tier	Surface	Partner	Opponents	Score
Loss	0–1	Feb 2009	Argentina Open, Argentina	250 Series	Clay	(Spain) Santiago Ventura Bertomeu	(Spain) Marcel Granollers (Spain) Alberto Martín	3–6, 7–5, [8–10]
Win	1–1	Aug 2015	Austrian Open Kitzbühel, Austria	250 Series	Clay	(Argentina) Carlos Berlocq	(Netherlands) Robin Haase (Finland) Henri Kontinen	5–7, 6–3, [11–9]

== Performance timelines ==
Key
W	F	SF	QF	#R	RR	Q#	P#	DNQ	A	Z#	PO	G	S	B	NMS	NTI	P	NH

(W) winner; (F) finalist; (SF) semifinalist; (QF) quarterfinalist; (#R) rounds 4, 3, 2, 1; (RR) round-robin stage; (Q#) qualification round; (P#) preliminary round; (DNQ) did not qualify; (A) absent; (Z#) Davis/Fed Cup Zonal Group (with number indication) or (PO) play-off; (G) gold, (S) silver or (B) bronze Olympic/Paralympic medal; (NMS) not a Masters tournament; (NTI) not a Tier I tournament; (P) postponed; (NH) not held; (SR) strike rate (events won / competed); (W–L) win–loss record.

=== Singles ===
Tournament	2003	2004	2005	2006	2007	2008	2009	2010	2011	2012	2013	2014	2015	2016	2017	2018	2019	SR	W–L	Win%
Grand Slam tournaments
Australian Open	A	A	1R	1R	1R	1R	3R	4R	4R	4R	QF	A	1R	2R	1R	A	A	0 / 12	16–12	59%
French Open	A	1R	2R	2R	2R	QF	3R	QF	1R	QF	4R	1R	2R	3R	2R	A	A	0 / 14	24–14	63%
Wimbledon	A	A	1R	1R	1R	2R	3R	1R	3R	3R	3R	A	1R	2R	A	A	A	0 / 11	10–11	48%
US Open	A	A	2R	1R	3R	3R	3R	3R	1R	4R	1R	A	Q2	3R	1R	A	A	0 / 11	14–11	56%
Win–loss	0–0	0–1	2–4	1–4	3–4	7–4	8–4	9–4	5–4	12–4	9–4	0–1	1–3	6–4	1–3	0–0	0–0	0 / 48	64–48	57%
Olympic Games
Summer Olympics	NH	A	Not Held			1R	Not Held			QF	Not Held			A	Not Held			0 / 2	3–2	60%
ATP World Tour Masters 1000
Indian Wells Masters	A	A	A	A	2R	2R	A	4R	3R	QF	3R	A	A	1R	A	A	A	0 / 7	8–7	53%
Miami Masters	A	A	1R	A	3R	3R	2R	QF	3R	4R	4R	3R	2R	A	A	A	A	0 / 10	12–10	55%
Monte Carlo Masters	A	A	A	A	1R	3R	1R	2R	3R	3R	2R	3R	A	1R	2R	A	A	0 / 10	10–9	53%
Rome Masters	A	A	3R	QF	2R	QF	1R	2R	3R	3R	1R	A	2R	A	2R	A	A	0 / 11	15–11	58%
Madrid Masters^{1}	A	1R	1R	A	QF	A	1R	SF	1R	3R	2R	2R	1R	1R	2R	A	A	0 / 12	12–12	50%
Canada Masters	A	A	A	1R	1R	A	A	2R	QF	A	1R	A	A	A	A	A	A	0 / 5	3–5	38%
Cincinnati Masters	A	A	A	2R	QF	A	2R	1R	3R	A	1R	A	A	1R	A	A	A	0 / 7	7–7	50%
Shanghai Masters^{2}	A	A	A	A	2R	1R	2R	1R	3R	1R	QF	A	A	2R	A	A	A	0 / 7	7–8	47%
Paris Masters	A	A	A	2R	1R	A	2R	2R	2R	3R	3R	A	A	1R	A	A	A	0 / 8	4–8	33%
Win–loss	0–0	0–1	2–3	5–4	9–9	5–5	3–7	13–9	11–9	11–7	9–9	4–2	2–3	1–6	3–3	0–0	0–0	0 / 78	78–77	50%
Career statistics
	2003	2004	2005	2006	2007	2008	2009	2010	2011	2012	2013	2014	2015	2016	2017	2018	2019	Career		
Tournaments	1	7	22	21	28	19	25	25	26	24	23	10	20	23	12	1	0	287		
Titles–Finals	0–0	0–0	0–0	1–1	1–2	2–3	1–1	2–2	3–5	2–4	0–2	0–1	0–0	1–2	0–0	0–0	0–0	13 / 23		
Overall win–loss	1–1	2–7	13–22	27–20	34–27	35–17	30–24	44–26	47–23	58–24	42–23	14–9	18–20	22–22	10–12	0–1	0–0	13 / 287	397–278	59%
Win %	50%	22%	37%	57%	56%	67%	56%	63%	67%	71%	65%	61%	47%	50%	45%	0%	0%	58.81%		
Year-end ranking	156	103	114	32	28	18	26	15	10	11	13	71	73	44	151	-	-	$10,752,234		

^{1}Held as Hamburg Masters till 2008.
^{2}Held as Madrid Masters till 2008.

=== Doubles ===
Tournament	2005	2006	2007	2008	2009	2010	2011	2012	2013	2014	2015	2016	2017	2018	2019	SR	W–L
Grand Slam tournaments
Australian Open	A	A	1R	2R	1R	A	1R	1R	A	A	A	A	A	A	A	0 / 5	1–5
French Open	1R	2R	A	1R	1R	3R	A	A	A	A	A	1R	1R	A	A	0 / 7	2–6
Wimbledon	A	1R	1R	A	A	1R	A	A	A	A	1R	1R	A	A	A	0 / 5	0–5
US Open	A	1R	1R	1R	2R	A	2R	A	A	A	A	3R	A	A	A	0 / 6	4–6
Win–loss	0–1	1–2	0–3	1–3	1–3	2–2	1–2	0–1	0–0	0–0	0–1	2–3	0–1	0–0	0–0	0 / 23	7–22

== Wins over top 10 players ==
Season	2003	2004	2005	2006	2007	2008	2009	2010	2011	2012	2013	2014	2015	2016	2017	2018	2019	Total
Wins	0	0	1	2	1	2	1	3	1	3	2	1	0	2	0	0	0	19

#	Player	Rank	Event	Surface	Rd	Score
2005
1.	(Russia) Marat Safin	4	Rome, Italy	Clay	2R	6–4, 6–3
2006
2.	(Argentina) Guillermo Coria	9	Barcelona, Spain	Clay	3R	6–2, 6–0
3.	(Russia) Nikolay Davydenko	6	Rome, Italy	Clay	3R	7–6^{(8–6)}, ret.
2007
4.	(Spain) Tommy Robredo	7	Hamburg, Germany	Clay	2R	6–7^{(1–7)}, 6–2, 6–4
2008
5.	(Argentina) David Nalbandian	8	Acapulco, Mexico	Clay	F	6–1, 7–6^{(7–1)}
6.	(Argentina) David Nalbandian	7	Rome, Italy	Clay	2R	6–4, 7–5
2009
7.	(France) Gaël Monfils	10	Acapulco, Mexico	Clay	F	6–4, 6–4
2010
8.	(Sweden) Robin Söderling	7	Madrid, Spain	Clay	2R	6–4, 7–5
9.	(Spain) Fernando Verdasco	9	French Open, Paris, France	Clay	4R	6–1, 4–6, 6–1, 6–4
10.	(Sweden) Robin Söderling	5	Båstad, Sweden	Clay	F	7–5, 3–6, 6–2
2011
11.	(Czech Republic) Tomáš Berdych	6	Nice, France	Clay	SF	6–4, 6–4
2012
12.	(Czech Republic) Tomáš Berdych	7	Indian Wells, United States	Hard	4R	6–4, 6–0
13.	(Serbia) Janko Tipsarević	8	French Open, Paris, France	Clay	4R	6–4, 6–4, 6–4
14.	(United States) John Isner	10	Davis Cup, Gijón, Spain	Clay	RR	6–4, 4–6, 6–4, 3–6, 7–5
2013
15.	(Serbia) Janko Tipsarević	9	Australian Open, Melbourne, Australia	Hard	4R	6–2, 5–1 ret.
16.	(Czech Republic) Tomáš Berdych	6	Shanghai, China	Hard	3R	6–7^{(6–8)}, 6–3, 7–6^{(7–4)}
2014
17.	(Spain) Rafael Nadal	1	Barcelona, Spain	Clay	QF	2–6, 7–6^{(7–5)}, 6–4
2016
18.	(France) Jo-Wilfried Tsonga	9	Buenos Aires, Argentina	Clay	QF	6–2, 7–5
19.	(Spain) David Ferrer	6	Buenos Aires, Argentina	Clay	SF	6–4, 7–5
