= 2010 Copa Petrobras Buenos Aires – Doubles =

Doubles
- 2010 Copa Petrobras Buenos Aires

Final
- Champions: (Argentina) Carlos Berlocq (Argentina) Brian Dabul
- Runners-up: (Chile) Jorge Aguilar (Argentina) Federico del Bonis
- Score: 6–3, 6–2

Events
Singles	Doubles
← 2009 ·	Copa Petrobras Buenos Aires	· 2011 →

Brian Dabul and Sergio Roitman were the defending champions, but Roitman retired from the professional tennis in 2009.
Dabul partners up with Carlos Berlocq and they won this tournament, by defeating Jorge Aguilar and Federico del Bonis 6–3, 6–2 in the final.

== Seeds ==
1. (Brazil) Franco Ferreiro / (Spain) Santiago Ventura (semifinals)
2. (Argentina) Máximo González / (Argentina) Sebastián Prieto (first round)
3. (Australia) Kaden Hensel / (Australia) Adam Hubble (quarterfinals)
4. (Portugal) Rui Machado / (Portugal) Leonardo Tavares (first round)

== Draw ==
=== Key ===
- Q = Qualifier
- WC = Wild card
- LL = Lucky loser
- Alt = Alternate
- SE = Special exempt
- PR = Protected ranking
- ITF = ITF entry
- JE = Junior exempt
- w/o = Walkover
- r = Retired
- d = Defaulted
- SR = Special ranking

=== Draw ===
First round
1	(Brazil) F Ferreiro (Spain) S Ventura	4	6	[10]
ALT	(Serbia) N Ćirić (Montenegro) G Tošić	6	4	[4]
(Argentina) J-M Aranguren (Argentina) A Fabbri	6	5	[7]
WC	(Argentina) J-P Amado (Brazil) G Clézar	4	7	[10]
3	(Australia) K Hensel (Australia) A Hubble	3	7	[10]
(Uruguay) M Cuevas (Uruguay) P Cuevas	6	6^{3}	[8]
(Argentina) C Berlocq (Argentina) B Dabul	7	6
(Argentina) F Bagnis (Chile) N Massú	5	2
WC	(Argentina) F Argüello (Argentina) A Velotti	6	3	[5]
(Argentina) D Junqueira (Argentina) G Pella	3	6	[10]
(Argentina) M Alund (Argentina) D Cristín	6	7
4	(Portugal) R Machado (Portugal) L Tavares	4	6^{5}
(Argentina) JP Brzezicki (Argentina) A Molteni	6	6
WC	(Argentina) G Durán (Argentina) F Mena	3	2
(Chile) J Aguilar (Argentina) F del Bonis	7	7
2	(Argentina) M González (Argentina) S Prieto	6^{3}	5

Quarterfinals
1	(Brazil) F Ferreiro (Spain) S Ventura	6	6
WC	(Argentina) J-P Amado (Brazil) G Clézar	4	1
3	(Australia) K Hensel (Australia) A Hubble	6	6^{4}	[4]
(Argentina) C Berlocq (Argentina) B Dabul	4	7	[10]
(Argentina) D Junqueira (Argentina) G Pella	6	6
(Argentina) M Alund (Argentina) D Cristín	3	4
(Argentina) JP Brzezicki (Argentina) A Molteni	6^{4}	6^{5}
(Chile) J Aguilar (Argentina) F del Bonis	7	7

Semifinals
1	(Brazil) F Ferreiro (Spain) S Ventura	2	4
(Argentina) C Berlocq (Argentina) B Dabul	6	6
(Argentina) D Junqueira (Argentina) G Pella	6	5	[6]
(Chile) J Aguilar (Argentina) F del Bonis	3	7	[10]

Finals
(Argentina) C Berlocq (Argentina) B Dabul	6	6
(Chile) J Aguilar (Argentina) F del Bonis	3	2
