= 2009 Copa Petrobras Buenos Aires – Singles =

Singles
- 2009 Copa Petrobras Buenos Aires

Final
- Champion: (Argentina) Horacio Zeballos
- Runner-up: (Argentina) Gastón Gaudio
- Score: 6–2, 3–6, 6–3

Events
Singles	Doubles
← 2008 ·	Copa Petrobras Buenos Aires	· 2010 →

Martín Vassallo Argüello chose to not defend his 2008 title.
Horacio Zeballos won in the final 6–2, 3–6, 6–3, against Gastón Gaudio.

== Seeds ==
1. (Argentina) Horacio Zeballos (champion)
2. (Argentina) Máximo González (quarterfinals)
3. (Chile) Nicolás Massú (first round)
4. (Argentina) Juan Ignacio Chela (semifinals)
5. (Spain) Santiago Ventura (quarterfinals)
6. (Argentina) Sergio Roitman (second round)
7. (Spain) Rubén Ramírez Hidalgo (second round)
8. (France) Laurent Recouderc (first round)

== Draw ==
=== Key ===
- Q = Qualifier
- WC = Wild card
- LL = Lucky loser
- Alt = Alternate
- ITF = ITF entry
- PR = Protected ranking
- SR = Special ranking
- SE = Special exempt
- JE = Junior exempt
- JR = Junior Accelerator Programme entrant
- CO = College Accelerator Programme entrant
- NG = Next Gen Accelerator Program entrant
- w/o = Walkover
- r = Retired
- d = Defaulted

=== Finals ===
Semifinals
1	(Argentina) Horacio Zeballos	6	6
(Brazil) Júlio Silva	3	3
4	(Argentina) Juan Ignacio Chela	4	2
(Argentina) Gastón Gaudio	6	6

Final
1	(Argentina) Horacio Zeballos	6	3	6
(Argentina) Gastón Gaudio	2	6	3

=== Top half ===
First round
1	(Argentina) H Zeballos	6	4	6
(Brazil) R Hocevar	4	6	4
WC	(Argentina) M Puerta	6	6
Q	(Argentina) A Molteni	4	3
(Argentina) B Dabul	6	6
WC	(Argentina) G Pella	4	3
(Brazil) F Ferreiro	2	4
7	(Spain) R Ramírez Hidalgo	6	6
3	(Chile) N Massú	3	1	r
(Spain) D Muñoz-De La Nava	6	2
Q	(Argentina) L Noviski	1	1
(Brazil) J Silva	6	6
(United States) A Bogomolov Jr.	6	4	2
Q	(Argentina) C Berlocq	3	6	6
(Brazil) J Souza	1	6	3
5	(Spain) S Ventura	6	3	6

Second round
1	(Argentina) H Zeballos	7	6^{8}	6
WC	(Argentina) M Puerta	5	7	3
(Argentina) B Dabul	7	2	6
7	(Spain) R Ramírez Hidalgo	6^{6}	6	3
(Spain) D Muñoz-De La Nava	2	4
(Brazil) J Silva	6	6
Q	(Argentina) C Berlocq	6	2	6^{5}
5	(Spain) S Ventura	4	6	7

Quarterfinals
1	(Argentina) H Zeballos	6	5	7
(Argentina) B Dabul	2	7	6^{5}
(Brazil) J Silva	3	6	6
5	(Spain) S Ventura	6	3	2

Semifinals
1	(Argentina) H Zeballos	6	6
(Brazil) J Silva	3	3

=== Bottom half ===
First round
6	(Argentina) S Roitman	6	6
(Slovenia) B Kavčič	3	3
(Ecuador) N Lapentti	7	6
(Argentina) E Schwank	6^{2}	2
(Argentina) M Alund	4	2
(Argentina) J-M Aranguren	6	6
Q	(Argentina) A Fabbri	1	0
4	(Argentina) JI Chela	6	6
8	(France) L Recouderc	6	2	2
(Argentina) D Junqueira	3	6	6
WC	(Argentina) M Zabaleta	1	6^{3}
(Argentina) G Gaudio	6	7
(Spain) D Marrero	6	6
WC	(Argentina) F Bagnis	2	4
(Argentina) JP Brzezicki	7	6^{4}	1
2	(Argentina) M González	5	7	6

Second round
6	(Argentina) S Roitman	2	4
(Ecuador) N Lapentti	6	6
(Argentina) J-M Aranguren	0	2
4	(Argentina) JI Chela	6	6
(Argentina) D Junqueira	2	2
(Argentina) G Gaudio	6	6
(Spain) D Marrero	4	2
2	(Argentina) M González	6	6

Quarterfinals
(Ecuador) N Lapentti	2	6	4
4	(Argentina) JI Chela	6	4	6
(Argentina) G Gaudio	3	6	6
2	(Argentina) M González	6	3	0

Semifinals
4	(Argentina) JI Chela	4	2
(Argentina) G Gaudio	6	6
