= 2008 Abierto Mexicano Telcel – Men's doubles =

Men's doubles
- 2008 Abierto Mexicano Telcel

Final
- Champions: (Austria) Oliver Marach (Slovakia) Michal Mertiňák
- Runners-up: (Argentina) Agustín Calleri (Peru) Luis Horna
- Score: 6–2, 6–7^{(3–7)}, [10–7]

Events
Singles	men	women
Doubles	men	women
← 2007 ·	Abierto Mexicano Telcel	· 2009 →

Potito Starace and Martín Vassallo Argüello were the defending champions. They were both present but did not compete together.
Starace partnered with Nicolás Massú, but lost in the semifinals to Oliver Marach and Michal Mertiňák.
Vassallo Argüello partnered with Albert Montañés, but lost in the first round to Óscar Hernández and Sergio Roitman.

Oliver Marach and Michal Mertiňák won in the final 6–2, 6–7^{(3–7)}, [10–7], against Agustín Calleri and Luis Horna.

== Seeds ==
1. (Czech Republic) František Čermák / (Czech Republic) Leoš Friedl (quarterfinals)
2. (Austria) Oliver Marach / (Slovakia) Michal Mertiňák (champions)
3. (Argentina) José Acasuso / (Argentina) Sebastián Prieto (semifinals)
4. (Spain) Marcel Granollers-Pujol / (Spain) Santiago Ventura (first round)

== Draw ==
=== Key ===
- Q = Qualifier
- WC = Wild card
- LL = Lucky loser
- Alt = Alternate
- SE = Special exempt
- PR = Protected ranking
- ITF = ITF entry
- JE = Junior exempt
- w/o = Walkover
- r = Retired
- d = Defaulted
- SR = Special ranking

=== Draw ===
First round
1	(Czech Republic) F Čermák (Czech Republic) L Friedl	6	6
(Argentina) C Berlocq (France) O Patience	3	4
WC	(Mexico) B Echagaray (Mexico) S González	2	2
(Argentina) A Calleri (Peru) L Horna	6	6
3	(Argentina) J Acasuso (Argentina) S Prieto	7^{7}	7^{7}
(Uruguay) P Cuevas (Ecuador) N Lapentti	6^{5}	6^{4}
(Spain) Montañés (Argentina) M Vassallo Argüello	4	5
(Spain) Ó Hernández (Argentina) S Roitman	6	7
WC	(Argentina) L Arnold Ker (Spain) C Moyá	4	7^{7}	[4]
(Argentina) M González (Argentina) J Mónaco	6	6^{2}	[10]
(Chile) N Massú (Italy) P Starace	6	7
4	(Spain) M Granollers-Pujol (Spain) S Ventura	4	5
(Australia) A Fisher (Australia) S Huss	2	6	[10]
(Italy) F Fognini (Italy) F Volandri	6	3	[12]
(Argentina) JP Brzezicki (Australia) P Luczak	4	1
2	(Austria) O Marach (Slovakia) M Mertiňák	6	6

Quarterfinals
1	(Czech Republic) F Čermák (Czech Republic) L Friedl	4	2
(Argentina) A Calleri (Peru) L Horna	6	6
3	(Argentina) J Acasuso (Argentina) S Prieto	6	6
(Spain) Ó Hernández (Argentina) S Roitman	2	4
(Argentina) M González (Argentina) J Mónaco	3	1
(Chile) N Massú (Italy) P Starace	6	6
(Italy) F Fognini (Italy) F Volandri	1	4
2	(Austria) O Marach (Slovakia) M Mertiňák	6	6

Semifinals
(Argentina) A Calleri (Peru) L Horna	6	6
3	(Argentina) J Acasuso (Argentina) S Prieto	2	1
(Chile) N Massú (Italy) P Starace	5	3
2	(Austria) O Marach (Slovakia) M Mertiňák	7	6

Final
(Argentina) A Calleri (Peru) L Horna	2	7^{7}	[7]
2	(Austria) O Marach (Slovakia) M Mertiňák	6	6^{3}	[10]
