= 2010 Copa Petrobras Buenos Aires – Singles =

Singles
- 2010 Copa Petrobras Buenos Aires

Final
- Champion: (Argentina) Máximo González
- Runner-up: (Uruguay) Pablo Cuevas
- Score: 6–4, 6–3

Events
Singles	Doubles
← 2009 ·	Copa Petrobras Buenos Aires	· 2011 →

Horacio Zeballos won last year's edition, but decided not to participate this year.
Máximo González won the title, by defeating top seed Pablo Cuevas 6–4, 6–3 in the final.

== Seeds ==
1. (Uruguay) Pablo Cuevas (final)
2. (Italy) Fabio Fognini (second round)
3. (Argentina) Brian Dabul (second round)
4. (Argentina) Carlos Berlocq (semifinals)
5. (Portugal) Rui Machado (second round)
6. (Chile) Nicolás Massú (second round, withdrew due to left foot injury)
7. (Paraguay) Ramón Delgado (first round)
8. (Argentina) Federico del Bonis (second round)

== Draw ==
=== Key ===
- Q = Qualifier
- WC = Wild card
- LL = Lucky loser
- Alt = Alternate
- ITF = ITF entry
- PR = Protected ranking
- SR = Special ranking
- SE = Special exempt
- JE = Junior exempt
- JR = Junior Accelerator Programme entrant
- CO = College Accelerator Programme entrant
- NG = Next Gen Accelerator Program entrant
- w/o = Walkover
- r = Retired
- d = Defaulted

=== Finals ===
Semifinals
1	(Uruguay) Pablo Cuevas	6	6
4	(Argentina) Carlos Berlocq	3	3
(Argentina) Juan Pablo Brzezicki	6	5	0
(Argentina) Máximo González	3	7	6

Final
1	(Uruguay) Pablo Cuevas	4	3
(Argentina) Máximo González	6	6

=== Top half ===
First round
1	(Uruguay) P Cuevas	6	6
(Argentina) M Vassallo Argüello	2	0
WC	(Brazil) G Clézar	2	4
(Argentina) P Galdón	6	6
(Argentina) D Junqueira	6	6
(Argentina) J-P Amado	2	1
(Montenegro) G Tošić	4	2
6	(Chile) N Massú	6	6
4	(Argentina) C Berlocq	6	6
(Argentina) M Alund	3	1
Q	(Argentina) A Molteni	6^{1}	7	7
LL	(Romania) C Gârd	7	5	5
WC	(Argentina) A Velotti	4
(Spain) G Alcaide	1	r
(Serbia) N Ćirić	6	6
7	(Paraguay) R Delgado	3	2

Second round
1	(Uruguay) P Cuevas	6	6
(Argentina) P Galdón	4	1
(Argentina) D Junqueira
6	(Chile) N Massú	w/o
4	(Argentina) C Berlocq	7	6
Q	(Argentina) A Molteni	5	3
WC	(Argentina) A Velotti	1	6^{6}
(Serbia) N Ćirić	6	7

Quarterfinals
1	(Uruguay) P Cuevas	6	6^{4}	6
(Argentina) D Junqueira	3	7	2
4	(Argentina) C Berlocq	6	3
(Serbia) N Ćirić	1	1	r

Semifinals
1	(Uruguay) P Cuevas	6	6
4	(Argentina) C Berlocq	3	3

=== Bottom half ===
First round
8	(Argentina) F del Bonis	6	5	6
Q	(Argentina) J-M Aranguren	2	7	3
WC	(Argentina) F Argüello	3	4
(Slovakia) P Červenák	6	6
PR	(Argentina) D Hartfield	0	7	5
(Argentina) JP Brzezicki	6	5	7
(Spain) S Ventura	4	2
3	(Argentina) B Dabul	6	6
5	(Portugal) R Machado	6	7
(Argentina) F Bagnis	4	6^{4}
(Chile) J Aguilar	6	6
(Portugal) L Tavares	2	2
(Argentina) M González	6	6
Q	(Argentina) M Trungelliti	1	2
Q	(Argentina) G Pella	3	4
2/WC	(Italy) F Fognini	6	6

Second round
8	(Argentina) F del Bonis	3	6^{3}
(Slovakia) P Červenák	6	7
(Argentina) JP Brzezicki	6	6
3	(Argentina) B Dabul	3	3
5	(Portugal) R Machado	6^{5}	6^{4}
(Chile) J Aguilar	7	7
(Argentina) M González	6	6
2/WC	(Italy) F Fognini	4	3

Quarterfinals
(Slovakia) P Červenák	4	4
(Argentina) JP Brzezicki	6	6
(Chile) J Aguilar	4	4
(Argentina) M González	6	6

Semifinals
(Argentina) JP Brzezicki	6	5	0
(Argentina) M González	3	7	6
