= 2009 Copa Petrobras Buenos Aires – Doubles =

Doubles
- 2009 Copa Petrobras Buenos Aires

Final
- Champions: (Argentina) Brian Dabul (Argentina) Sergio Roitman
- Runners-up: (Argentina) Lucas Arnold Ker (Argentina) Máximo González
- Score: 6–4, 7–5

Events
Singles	Doubles
← 2008 ·	Copa Petrobras Buenos Aires	· 2010 →

Máximo González and Sebastián Prieto were the defending champions, but they didn't participate together this year.
Prieto played with Horacio Zeballos, but they were eliminated by Juan Pablo Brzezicki and David Marrero already in the first round.
González played with Lucas Arnold Ker and they reached the final, where they lost to Brian Dabul and Sergio Roitman 4–6, 5–7.

== Seeds ==
1. (Spain) Rubén Ramírez Hidalgo / (Spain) Santiago Ventura (semifinals)
2. (Argentina) Sebastián Prieto / (Argentina) Horacio Zeballos (first round)
3. (Argentina) Lucas Arnold Ker / (Argentina) Máximo González (final)
4. (Argentina) Brian Dabul / (Argentina) Sergio Roitman (champions)

== Draw ==
=== Key ===
- Q = Qualifier
- WC = Wild card
- LL = Lucky loser
- Alt = Alternate
- SE = Special exempt
- PR = Protected ranking
- ITF = ITF entry
- JE = Junior exempt
- w/o = Walkover
- r = Retired
- d = Defaulted
- SR = Special ranking

=== Draw ===
First round
1	(Spain) R Ramírez Hidalgo (Spain) S Ventura	6	4	[10]
WC	(Argentina) M Alund (Argentina) F Bagnis	2	6	[6]
(United States) A Bogomolov Jr. (Argentina) Lionel Noviski	2	4
(Brazil) F Ferreiro (Spain) D Muñoz-De La Nava	6	6
3	(Argentina) L Arnold Ker (Argentina) M González	7	6
(Argentina) C Berlocq (Argentina) E Schwank	5	2
(Brazil) R Hocevar (Brazil) J Souza	2	4
(Argentina) A Molteni (Argentina) G Pella	6	6
(Argentina) J-M Aranguren (Argentina) D Junqueira	6	6
WC	(Argentina) F Mena (Argentina) Federico Paskvan	4	4
(Argentina) D Cristín (Argentina) A Fabbri	4	4
4	(Argentina) B Dabul (Argentina) S Roitman	6	6
(Argentina) A Pastorino (Portugal) L Tavares	1	6	[10]
WC	(Argentina) A Collarini (Argentina) A Velotti	6	4	[5]
(Argentina) JP Brzezicki (Spain) D Marrero	6	6^{5}	[10]
2	(Argentina) S Prieto (Argentina) H Zeballos	4	7	[7]

Quarterfinals
1	(Spain) R Ramírez Hidalgo (Spain) S Ventura	6	7
(Brazil) F Ferreiro (Spain) D Muñoz-De La Nava	2	6^{4}
3	(Argentina) L Arnold Ker (Argentina) M González	6	6
(Argentina) A Molteni (Argentina) G Pella	4	2
(Argentina) J-M Aranguren (Argentina) D Junqueira	4	2
4	(Argentina) B Dabul (Argentina) S Roitman	6	6
(Argentina) A Pastorino (Portugal) L Tavares	6^{3}	1
(Argentina) JP Brzezicki (Spain) D Marrero	7	6

Semifinals
1	(Spain) R Ramírez Hidalgo (Spain) S Ventura	5	3
3	(Argentina) L Arnold Ker (Argentina) M González	7	6
4	(Argentina) B Dabul (Argentina) S Roitman
(Argentina) JP Brzezicki (Spain) D Marrero	w/o

Finals
3	(Argentina) L Arnold Ker (Argentina) M González	7	0	[8]
4	(Argentina) B Dabul (Argentina) S Roitman	6^{4}	6	[10]
