= 2007 Abierto Mexicano Telcel – Men's singles =

Men's singles
- 2007 Abierto Mexicano Telcel

Final
- Champion: (Argentina) Juan Ignacio Chela
- Runner-up: (Spain) Carlos Moyá
- Score: 6–3, 7–6^{(7–2)}

Events
Singles	men	women
Doubles	men	women
- Abierto Mexicano Telcel

Luis Horna was the defending champion, but retired due to a right leg injury, in the first round against Gastón Gaudio.

Juan Ignacio Chela won in the final 6–3, 7–6^{(7–2)}, against Carlos Moyá.

== Seeds ==
1. (Spain) Juan Carlos Ferrero (semifinals)
2. (Argentina) Agustín Calleri (semifinals, retired due to a hamstring injury)
3. (Spain) Nicolás Almagro (quarterfinals)
4. (Argentina) Juan Ignacio Chela (champion)
5. (Argentina) Gastón Gaudio (quarterfinals)
6. (Chile) Nicolás Massú (quarterfinals)
7. (Argentina) José Acasuso (quarterfinals)
8. (Spain) Carlos Moyá (final)

== Draw ==
Key

- Q = Qualifier
- WC = Wild card
- LL = Lucky loser
- Alt = Alternate
- ITF = ITF entry
- PR = Protected ranking
- SR = Special ranking
- SE = Special exempt
- JE = Junior exempt
- JR = Junior Accelerator Programme entrant
- CO = College Accelerator Programme entrant
- NG = Next Gen Accelerator Program entrant
- w/o = Walkover
- r = Retired
- d = Defaulted

=== Finals ===
Semifinals
1	(Spain) Juan Carlos Ferrero	6	2	3
8	(Spain) Carlos Moyá	2	6	6
4	(Argentina) Juan Ignacio Chela	4	5
2	(Argentina) Agustín Calleri	6	5^{r}

Final
8	(Spain) Carlos Moyá	3	6^{2}
4	(Argentina) Juan Ignacio Chela	6	7^{7}

=== Top half ===
First round
1	(Spain) JC Ferrero	7^{7}	4	6
(Italy) P Starace	6^{3}	6	3
(Czech Republic) L Dlouhý	6	6
(Italy) A di Mauro	3	2
Q	(Argentina) JP Guzmán	6	6
(United States) K Kim	4	2
(Peru) L Horna	1^{r}
5	(Argentina) G Gaudio	1
3	(Spain) N Almagro	6	6
WC	(Argentina) M Zabaleta	3	4
(Spain) R Ramírez Hidalgo	6	6
WC	(Mexico) S González	4	3
(Argentina) D Hartfield	6	7^{7}
Q	(United States) H Armando	4	6^{4}
WC	(Mexico) B Echagaray	3	4
8	(Spain) C Moyá	6	6

Second round
1	(Spain) JC Ferrero	6	7^{7}
(Czech Republic) L Dlouhý	3	6^{2}
Q	(Argentina) JP Guzmán	6	3	2
5	(Argentina) G Gaudio	1	6	6
3	(Spain) N Almagro	6	4	7^{7}
(Spain) R Ramírez Hidalgo	1	6	6^{2}
(Argentina) D Hartfield	6	1	4
8	(Spain) C Moyá	4	6	6

Quarterfinals
1	(Spain) JC Ferrero	6	6
5	(Argentina) G Gaudio	4	1
3	(Spain) N Almagro	6^{3}	3
8	(Spain) C Moyá	7^{7}	6

Semifinals
1	(Spain) JC Ferrero	6	2	3
8	(Spain) C Moyá	2	6	6

=== Bottom half ===
First round
6	(Chile) N Massú	7^{7}	7
(Argentina) J Mónaco	6^{4}	5
(Italy) S Galvani	6	6
(Czech Republic) J Hájek	3	2
Q	(Italy) F Fognini	6^{2}	7^{7}	4
(France) N Devilder	7^{7}	6^{5}	6
(Argentina) S Roitman	3	2
4	(Argentina) JI Chela	6	6
7	(Argentina) J Acasuso	6	7
(Spain) A Montañés	0	5
(Czech Republic) J Vaněk	2	6	6
(Argentina) M Vassallo Argüello	6	1	3
Q	(Spain) Ó Hernández	6	7
(Spain) F Vicente	2	5
(Spain) A Martín	3	2
2	(Argentina) A Calleri	6	6

Second round
6	(Chile) N Massú	7^{7}	6
(Italy) S Galvani	6^{2}	3
(France) N Devilder	0	4
4	(Argentina) JI Chela	6	6
7	(Argentina) J Acasuso	6	6
(Czech Republic) J Vaněk	1	2
Q	(Spain) Ó Hernández	6	3	3
2	(Argentina) A Calleri	4	6	6

Quarterfinals
6	(Chile) N Massú	3	7^{8}	5
4	(Argentina) JI Chela	6	6^{6}	7
7	(Argentina) J Acasuso	3	4
2	(Argentina) A Calleri	6	6

Semifinals
4	(Argentina) JI Chela	4	5
2	(Argentina) A Calleri	6	5^{r}
