= 2009 Copa Petrobras Buenos Aires =

- Date: 28 September – 4 October
- Edition: 6th
- Location: Buenos Aires, Argentina

Champions

Singles
- (Argentina) Horacio Zeballos

Doubles
- (Argentina) Brian Dabul / (Argentina) Sergio Roitman
← 2008 ·	Copa Petrobras Buenos Aires	· 2010 →

The 2009 Copa Petrobras Buenos Aires was a professional tennis tournament played on outdoor clay courts. It was part of the 2009 ATP Challenger Tour. It took place in Buenos Aires, Argentina between 28 September and 4 October 2009.

== Singles main draw entrants ==
=== Seeds ===
Country	Player	Rank^{1}	Seed
ARG	Horacio Zeballos	58	1
ARG	Máximo González	67	2
CHI	Nicolás Massú	96	3
ARG	Juan Ignacio Chela	111	4
ESP	Santiago Ventura	112	5
ARG	Sergio Roitman	124	6
ESP	Rubén Ramírez Hidalgo	125	7
FRA	Laurent Recouderc	132	8

- Rankings are as of September 21, 2009.

=== Other entrants ===
The following players received wildcards into the singles main draw:

- (Argentina) Facundo Bagnis
- (Argentina) Mariano Zabaleta
- (Argentina) Guido Pella
- (Argentina) Mariano Puerta

The following players received entry from the qualifying draw:

- (Argentina) Carlos Berlocq
- (Argentina) Alejandro Fabbri
- (Argentina) Andrés Molteni
- (Argentina) Lionel Noviski

== Champions ==
=== Singles ===
(Argentina) Horacio Zeballos def. (Argentina) Gastón Gaudio, 6–2, 3–6, 6–3

=== Doubles ===
(Argentina) Brian Dabul / (Argentina) Sergio Roitman def. (Argentina) Máximo González / (Argentina) Lucas Arnold Ker, 6–4, 7–5
