= 2009 Abierto Mexicano Telcel – Men's doubles =

Men's doubles
- 2009 Abierto Mexicano Telcel

Final
- Champions: (Czech Republic) František Čermák (Slovakia) Michal Mertiňák
- Runners-up: (Poland) Łukasz Kubot (Austria) Oliver Marach
- Score: 4–6, 6–4, [10–7]

Events
| Singles | men | women |
| Doubles | men | women |
| ← 2008 · | Abierto Mexicano Telcel | · 2010 → |

Oliver Marach and Michal Mertiňák were the defending champions, but did not compete together that year.
Marach partnered with Łukasz Kubot, but lost in the final to František Čermák and Mertiňák.
Mertiňák partnered with Čermák and won the final 4–6, 6–4, [10–7].

== Seeds ==
1. (Czech Republic) František Čermák / (Slovakia) Michal Mertiňák (champions)
2. (Poland) Łukasz Kubot / (Austria) Oliver Marach (final)
3. (United States) Travis Parrott / (Slovakia) Filip Polášek (semifinals)
4. (Australia) Paul Hanley / (Australia) Jordan Kerr (semifinals)

== Draw ==
=== Key ===
- Q = Qualifier
- WC = Wild card
- LL = Lucky loser
- Alt = Alternate
- SE = Special exempt
- PR = Protected ranking
- ITF = ITF entry
- JE = Junior exempt
- w/o = Walkover
- r = Retired
- d = Defaulted
- SR = Special ranking

=== Draw ===
First round
1 | (Czech Republic) F Čermák (Slovakia) M Mertiňák | 6 | 7
(Spain) N Almagro (Spain) R Ramírez Hidalgo | 3 | 5
(Spain) Ó Hernández (Spain) A Montañés | 3 | 1
(Argentina) JI Chela (Uruguay) P Cuevas | 6 | 6
3 | (United States) T Parrott (Slovakia) F Polášek | 6 | 6
(Spain) M Granollers (Spain) S Ventura | 4 | 2
(United States) J Cerretani (Spain) I Navarro | 6^{3} | 6^{8}
(Argentina) L Arnold Ker (Ecuador) N Lapentti | 7^{7} | 7^{10}
(Belgium) D Norman (Netherlands) R Wassen | 3 | 2
WC | (Mexico) B Echagaray (Mexico) S González | 6 | 6
(Argentina) J Acasuso (Argentina) S Prieto | 1 | 2
4 | (Australia) P Hanley (Australia) J Kerr | 6 | 6
(Brazil) T Bellucci (Argentina) D Junqueira | 1 | 6 | [13]
(Italy) P Starace (Argentina) M Vassallo Argüello | 6 | 4 | [15]
WC | (Mexico) J-M Elizondo (Mexico) C Ramírez | 4 | 6^{3}
2 | (Poland) Ł Kubot (Austria) O Marach | 6 | 7^{7}

Quarterfinals
1 | (Czech Republic) F Čermák (Slovakia) M Mertiňák | 4 | 6 | [10]
(Argentina) JI Chela (Uruguay) P Cuevas | 6 | 3 | [8]
3 | (United States) T Parrott (Slovakia) F Polášek | 7 | 4 | [10]
(Argentina) L Arnold Ker (Ecuador) N Lapentti | 5 | 6 | [5]
WC | (Mexico) B Echagaray (Mexico) S González | 3 | 4
4 | (Australia) P Hanley (Australia) J Kerr | 6 | 6
(Italy) P Starace (Argentina) M Vassallo Argüello | 3 | 6 | [9]
2 | (Poland) Ł Kubot (Austria) O Marach | 6 | 3 | [11]

Semifinals
1 | (Czech Republic) F Čermák (Slovakia) M Mertiňák | 6 | 6
3 | (United States) T Parrott (Slovakia) F Polášek | 3 | 1
4 | (Australia) P Hanley (Australia) J Kerr | 2 | 6 | [9]
2 | (Poland) Ł Kubot (Austria) O Marach | 6 | 3 | [11]

Final
1 | (Czech Republic) F Čermák (Slovakia) M Mertiňák | 4 | 6 | [10]
2 | (Poland) Ł Kubot (Austria) O Marach | 6 | 4 | [7]
