= 2007 Abierto Mexicano Telcel – Men's doubles =

Men's doubles
- 2007 Abierto Mexicano Telcel

Final
- Champions: (Italy) Potito Starace (Argentina) Martín Vassallo Argüello
- Runners-up: (Czech Republic) Lukáš Dlouhý (Czech Republic) Pavel Vízner
- Score: 6–0, 6–2

Events
Singles	men	women
Doubles	men	women
← 2006 ·	Abierto Mexicano Telcel	· 2008 →

František Čermák and Leoš Friedl were the defending champions, but Čermák chose not to participate, and only Friedl competed that year.
Friedl partnered with Michael Kohlmann, but lost in the quarterfinals to Jordan Kerr and David Škoch.

Potito Starace and Martín Vassallo Argüello won in the final 6–0, 6–2, against Lukáš Dlouhý and Pavel Vízner.

== Seeds ==
1. (Czech Republic) Lukáš Dlouhý / (Czech Republic) Pavel Vízner (final)
2. (Poland) Mariusz Fyrstenberg / (Poland) Marcin Matkowski (first round)
3. (Czech Republic) Leoš Friedl / (Germany) Michael Kohlmann (quarterfinals)
4. (Argentina) Martín García / (Argentina) Sebastián Prieto (first round)

== Draw ==
=== Key ===
- Q = Qualifier
- WC = Wild card
- LL = Lucky loser
- Alt = Alternate
- SE = Special exempt
- PR = Protected ranking
- ITF = ITF entry
- JE = Junior exempt
- w/o = Walkover
- r = Retired
- d = Defaulted
- SR = Special ranking

=== Draw ===
First round
1	(Czech Republic) L Dlouhý (Czech Republic) P Vízner	6	1
(Czech Republic) T Cibulec (Czech Republic) J Hájek	4	0^{r}
(Spain) Montañés (Spain) R Ramírez Hidalgo	7^{7}	1	[12]
(United States) H Armando (United States) T Parrott	6^{4}	6	[10]
3	(Czech Republic) L Friedl (Germany) M Kohlmann	6	7^{9}
(Spain) A Martín (Spain) F Vicente	1	6^{7}
(Australia) J Kerr (Czech Republic) D Škoch	6	6
WC	(Mexico) M Gallardo Valles (Mexico) D Garza	4	0
(Brazil) M Melo (Brazil) A Sá	7	6
(Spain) N Almagro (Spain) M Granollers-Pujol	5	0
(Italy) P Starace (Argentina) M Vassallo Argüello	6	7^{7}
4	(Argentina) M García (Argentina) S Prieto	2	6^{2}
WC	(Mexico) B Echagaray (Mexico) S González	2	4
(Argentina) J Acasuso (Argentina) A Calleri	6	6
(Argentina) C Berlocq (Chile) N Massú	6	6
2	(Poland) M Fyrstenberg (Poland) M Matkowski	2	4

Quarterfinals
1	(Czech Republic) L Dlouhý (Czech Republic) P Vízner	6	6
(Spain) Montañés (Spain) R Ramírez Hidalgo	3	1
3	(Czech Republic) L Friedl (Germany) M Kohlmann	6^{5}	6	[7]
(Australia) J Kerr (Czech Republic) D Škoch	7^{7}	4	[10]
(Brazil) M Melo (Brazil) A Sá	2	2
(Italy) P Starace (Argentina) M Vassallo Argüello	6	6
(Argentina) J Acasuso (Argentina) A Calleri	6	3	[10]
(Argentina) C Berlocq (Chile) N Massú	4	6	[6]

Semifinals
1	(Czech Republic) L Dlouhý (Czech Republic) P Vízner	3	6	[10]
(Australia) J Kerr (Czech Republic) D Škoch	6	2	[7]
(Italy) P Starace (Argentina) M Vassallo Argüello	w/o
(Argentina) J Acasuso (Argentina) A Calleri

Final
1	(Czech Republic) L Dlouhý (Czech Republic) P Vízner	0	2
(Italy) P Starace (Argentina) M Vassallo Argüello	6	6
