= 2009 Abierto Mexicano Telcel – Men's singles =

Men's singles
- 2009 Abierto Mexicano Telcel

Final
- Champion: (Spain) Nicolás Almagro
- Runner-up: (France) Gaël Monfils
- Score: 6–4, 6–4

Events
Singles	men	women
Doubles	men	women
- Abierto Mexicano Telcel

Nicolás Almagro was the defending champion, and defeated Gaël Monfils 6–4, 6–4, in the final.

== Seeds ==
1. (Argentina) David Nalbandian (first round)
2. (France) Gaël Monfils (final)
3. (Spain) Tommy Robredo (quarterfinals)
4. (Spain) Nicolás Almagro (champion)
5. (Argentina) José Acasuso (semifinals)
6. (Spain) Albert Montañés (second round)
7. (Spain) Marcel Granollers (second round)
8. (Spain) Carlos Moyá (second round)

== Draw ==
Key

- Q = Qualifier
- WC = Wild card
- LL = Lucky loser
- Alt = Alternate
- ITF = ITF entry
- PR = Protected ranking
- SR = Special ranking
- SE = Special exempt
- JE = Junior exempt
- JR = Junior Accelerator Programme entrant
- CO = College Accelerator Programme entrant
- NG = Next Gen Accelerator Program entrant
- w/o = Walkover
- r = Retired
- d = Defaulted

=== Finals ===
Semifinals
(Argentina) Martín Vassallo Argüello	4	4
4	(Spain) Nicolás Almagro	6	6
5	(Argentina) José Acasuso	3	4
2	(France) Gaël Monfils	6	6

Final
4	(Spain) Nicolás Almagro	6	6
2	(France) Gaël Monfils	4	4

=== Top half ===
First round
1	(Argentina) D Nalbandian	6	3	4
Q	(Austria) D Köllerer	1	6	6
(Brazil) M Daniel	4	5
(Spain) A Martín	6	7
(Argentina) M Vassallo Arguello	6	5	7^{7}
(Spain) I Navarro	3	7	6^{3}
(Italy) F Fognini	6^{3}	5
7	(Spain) M Granollers	7^{7}	7
4	(Spain) N Almagro	6	6
WC	(Mexico) S González	4	2
(Spain) Ó Hernández	4	2
(Italy) P Starace	6	6
(Ecuador) N Lapentti	4	7	3
(Spain) D Gimeno-Traver	6	5	6
WC	(Mexico) B Echagaray	1	4
6	(Spain) A Montañés	6	6

Second round
Q	(Austria) D Köllerer	6	5	7^{7}
(Spain) A Martín	4	7	6^{4}
(Argentina) M Vassallo Arguello	6	6
7	(Spain) M Granollers	4	3
4	(Spain) N Almagro	7^{7}	6^{5}	6
(Italy) P Starace	6^{1}	7^{7}	3
(Spain) D Gimeno-Traver	7^{7}	7^{7}
6	(Spain) A Montañés	6^{5}	6^{5}

Quarterfinals
Q	(Austria) D Köllerer	3	6^{6}
(Argentina) M Vassallo Arguello	6	7^{8}
4	(Spain) N Almagro	6	7^{7}
(Spain) D Gimeno-Traver	2	6^{2}

Semifinals
(Argentina) M Vassallo Arguello	4	4
4	(Spain) N Almagro	6	6

=== Bottom half ===
First round
5	(Argentina) J Acasuso	6	7
(Argentina) B Dabul	3	5
WC	(Argentina) JI Chela	2	6	6
Q	(Uruguay) P Cuevas	6	3	2
(Argentina) J Mónaco	6	0^{r}
(United States) K Kim	1	3
Q	(Spain) R Ramírez Hidalgo	4	6	3
3	(Spain) T Robredo	6	3	6
8	(Spain) C Moyá	6	6^{2}	6
(Spain) P Andújar	4	7^{7}	2
(Argentina) L Mayer	7^{7}	6
(Argentina) D Junqueira	6^{1}	3
(Brazil) T Bellucci	3	6	6
(France) N Devilder	6	4	4
Q	(France) O Patience	6^{4}	4
2	(France) G Monfils	7^{7}	6

Second round
5	(Argentina) J Acasuso	7	6
WC	(Argentina) JI Chela	5	3
(United States) K Kim	2	0
3	(Spain) T Robredo	6	6
8	(Spain) C Moyá	4	5
(Argentina) L Mayer	6	7
(Brazil) T Bellucci	6^{4}	7^{7}	1
2	(France) G Monfils	7^{7}	6^{5}	6

Quarterfinals
5	(Argentina) J Acasuso	7	6
3	(Spain) T Robredo	5	2
(Argentina) L Mayer	3	7^{7}	1^{r}
2	(France) G Monfils	6	6^{4}	4

Semifinals
5	(Argentina) J Acasuso	3	4
2	(France) G Monfils	6	6

== Qualifying ==
=== Seeds ===
1. (Austria) Daniel Köllerer (qualified)
2. (Spain) Rubén Ramírez Hidalgo (qualified)
3. (France) Olivier Patience (qualified)
4. (Uruguay) Pablo Cuevas (qualified)
5. (Argentina) Horacio Zeballos (qualifying competition)
6. (Argentina) Sebastián Decoud (first round)
7. (Spain) Miguel Ángel López Jaén (qualifying competition)
8. (Poland) Łukasz Kubot (qualifying competition)

=== Qualifiers ===
1. (Austria) Daniel Köllerer
2. (Spain) Rubén Ramírez Hidalgo
3. (France) Olivier Patience
4. (Uruguay) Pablo Cuevas

=== Draw ===
==== First qualifier ====
First round
1	(Austria) Daniel Köllerer	6	6
(Mexico) Juan Manuel Elizondo	2	3
(Austria) Oliver Marach	5	3
8	(Poland) Łukasz Kubot	7	6

Qualifying competition
1	(Austria) Daniel Köllerer	7	3	6
8	(Poland) Łukasz Kubot	5	6	3

==== Second qualifier ====
First round
2	(Spain) Rubén Ramírez Hidalgo	6	6
WC	(Mexico) Jose Gerardo Meza	3	2
WC	(Mexico) Luis-Manuel Flores	4	1
5	(Argentina) Horacio Zeballos	6	6

Qualifying competition
2	(Spain) Rubén Ramírez Hidalgo	6	6
5	(Argentina) Horacio Zeballos	3	4

==== Third qualifier ====
First round
3	(France) Olivier Patience	6	6
(Chile) Sebastian Rivera	2	1
(Venezuela) José de Armas	5	1
7	(Spain) Miguel Ángel López Jaén	7	6

Qualifying competition
3	(France) Olivier Patience	6	6
7	(Spain) Miguel Ángel López Jaén	3	2

==== Fourth qualifier ====
First round
4	(Uruguay) Pablo Cuevas	6	6
WC	(Mexico) César Ramírez	4	4
(Czech Republic) František Čermák	2	6	7^{7}
6	(Argentina) Sebastián Decoud	6	4	6^{2}

Qualifying competition
4	(Uruguay) Pablo Cuevas	6	6
(Czech Republic) František Čermák	4	2
