= 2008 Abierto Mexicano Telcel – Men's singles =

Men's singles
- 2008 Abierto Mexicano Telcel

Final
- Champion: (Spain) Nicolás Almagro
- Runner-up: (Argentina) David Nalbandian
- Score: 6–1, 7–6^{(7–1)}

Details
- Draw: 32 (4Q / 3WC)
- Seeds: 8

Events
Singles	men	women
Doubles	men	women
- Abierto Mexicano Telcel

Juan Ignacio Chela was the defending champion, but lost in the second round to Agustín Calleri.

Sixth-seeded Nicolás Almagro won in the final 6–1, 7–6^{(7–1)}, against David Nalbandian.

== Seeds ==
1. (Argentina) David Nalbandian (final)
2. (Spain) Carlos Moyá (second round)
3. (Argentina) Juan Mónaco (second round)
4. (Argentina) Guillermo Cañas (second round)
5. (Argentina) Juan Ignacio Chela (second round)
6. (Spain) Nicolás Almagro (champion)
7. (Russia) Igor Andreev (first round)
8. (Italy) Potito Starace (quarterfinals)

== Draw ==
Key

- Q = Qualifier
- WC = Wild card
- LL = Lucky loser
- Alt = Alternate
- ITF = ITF entry
- PR = Protected ranking
- SR = Special ranking
- SE = Special exempt
- JE = Junior exempt
- JR = Junior Accelerator Programme entrant
- CO = College Accelerator Programme entrant
- NG = Next Gen Accelerator Program entrant
- w/o = Walkover
- r = Retired
- d = Defaulted

=== Finals ===
Semifinals
1	(Argentina) David Nalbandian	7	6
(Peru) Luis Horna	5	1
(Argentina) José Acasuso	4	6	5
6	(Spain) Nicolás Almagro	6	3	7

Final
1	(Argentina) David Nalbandian	1	6^{1}
6	(Spain) Nicolás Almagro	6	7^{7}

=== Top half ===
First round
1	(Argentina) D Nalbandian	6	7
(Serbia) B Pašanski	2	5
(Spain) S Ventura	6	6
WC	(Mexico) C Ramírez	3	1
(Argentina) S Roitman	3	4
(Australia) P Luczak	6	6
Q	(Ecuador) N Lapentti	4	2
8	(Italy) P Starace	6	6
3	(Argentina) J Mónaco	6	2	6
(Argentina) JP Brzezicki	3	6	3
(Peru) L Horna	6	7
(Italy) F Fognini	4	5
WC	(Mexico) B Echagaray	4	1
(Argentina) A Calleri	6	6
Q	(Uruguay) P Cuevas	6^{4}	4
5	(Argentina) JI Chela	7^{7}	6

Second round
1	(Argentina) D Nalbandian	6	6
(Spain) S Ventura	2	3
(Australia) P Luczak	3	3
8	(Italy) P Starace	6	6
3	(Argentina) J Mónaco	6^{4}	3
(Peru) L Horna	7^{7}	6
(Argentina) A Calleri	7^{7}	5	6
5	(Argentina) JI Chela	6^{4}	6	1

Quarterfinals
1	(Argentina) D Nalbandian	6	6
8	(Italy) P Starace	3	2
(Peru) L Horna	6	3	6
(Argentina) A Calleri	4	6	3

Semifinals
1	(Argentina) D Nalbandian	7	6
(Peru) L Horna	5	1

=== Bottom half ===
First round
7	(Russia) I Andreev	6^{4}	3
(Spain) Montañés	7^{7}	6
Q	(Spain) M Granollers-Pujol	6	6
WC	(Mexico) B Rodríguez	3	3
(Spain) Ó Hernández	4	0
(Argentina) J Acasuso	6	6
(Argentina) C Berlocq	4	7^{7}	4
4	(Argentina) G Cañas	6	6^{5}	6
6	(Spain) N Almagro	6	6
(Czech Republic) J Vaněk	1	2
Q	(Czech Republic) I Minář	4	5
(Italy) F Volandri	6	7
(Chile) N Massú	6	6
(Argentina) M Vassallo Argüello	3	4
(Austria) W Eschauer	4	4
2	(Spain) C Moyá	6	6

Second round
(Spain) Montañés	2	6^{6}
Q	(Spain) M Granollers-Pujol	6	7^{8}
(Argentina) J Acasuso	4	6	6
4	(Argentina) G Cañas	6	2	2
6	(Spain) N Almagro	6	6
(Italy) F Volandri	3	3
(Chile) N Massú	6	6
2	(Spain) C Moyá	4	2

Quarterfinals
Q	(Spain) M Granollers-Pujol	6^{2}	3
(Argentina) J Acasuso	7^{7}	6
6	(Spain) N Almagro	4	6	6
(Chile) N Massú	6	3	3

Semifinals
(Argentina) J Acasuso	4	6	5
6	(Spain) N Almagro	6	3	7
