= 2009 Abierto Mexicano Telcel =

- Date: 23–28 February
- Edition: 16th (men) / 9th (women)
- Category: ATP World Tour 500 (ATP); WTA International (WTA)
- Surface: Clay / outdoor
- Location: Acapulco, Mexico

Champions

Men's singles
- (Spain) Nicolás Almagro

Women's singles
- (United States) Venus Williams

Men's doubles
- (Czech Republic) František Čermák / (Slovakia) Michal Mertiňák

Women's doubles
- (Spain) Nuria Llagostera Vives / (Spain) María José Martínez Sánchez
← 2008 ·	Mexican Open	· 2010 →

The 2009 Abierto Mexicano Telcel was a tennis tournament played on outdoor clay courts. It was the 16th edition of the men's tournament (9th for the women) of the Abierto Mexicano Telcel, and was part of the 500 series of the 2009 ATP World Tour, and was in the International category of tournaments on the 2009 WTA Tour. Both the men's and the women's events took place at the Fairmont Acapulco Princess in Acapulco, Mexico, from February 23 through February 28, 2009.

The men's singles draw included David Nalbandian, the 2008 runner-up in this event and winner in Sydney earlier this year; Gaël Monfils, a semifinalist in Doha and Rotterdam earlier this year; Nicolás Almagro, the defending champion; Tommy Robredo, a semifinalist in Viña del Mar and winner of Costa do Sauipe and Buenos Aires earlier this year; Carlos Moyá, a two-time champion of this event; Albert Montañés; José Acasuso, Viña del Mar runner-up and Costa do Sauipe semifinalist earlier this year; and Juan Mónaco.

The women's singles draw included two top 20 players: Dubai champion Venus Williams and Flavia Pennetta, who has reached the final of this event the last five years and won it twice. Carla Suárez Navarro, 2004 champion Iveta Benešová, Bogotá runner-up Gisela Dulko, Lucie Šafářová, Tathiana Garbin, and Bogotá champion María José Martínez Sánchez were also in the draw.

== Finals ==
=== Men's singles ===
(Spain) Nicolás Almagro defeated (France) Gaël Monfils, 6–4, 6–4

- It was Almagro's first title of the year and 5th of his career. It was his second win at the event, also winning in 2008.

=== Women's singles ===
(United States) Venus Williams defeated (Italy) Flavia Pennetta, 6–1, 6–2

- It was Venus' second title of the year and 41st of her career.

=== Men's doubles ===
(Czech Republic) František Čermák / (Slovakia) Michal Mertiňák defeated (Poland) Łukasz Kubot / (Austria) Oliver Marach, 4–6, 6–4, [10–7]

=== Women's doubles ===
(Spain) Nuria Llagostera Vives / (Spain) María José Martínez Sánchez defeated (Spain) Lourdes Domínguez Lino / (Spain) Arantxa Parra Santonja, 6–4, 6–2

== ATP entrants ==
=== Seeds ===
Athlete	Nationality	Ranking*	Seeding
David Nalbandian	Argentina	12	1
Gaël Monfils	France	10	2
Tommy Robredo	Spain	15	3
Nicolás Almagro	Spain	21	4
José Acasuso	Argentina	43	5
Albert Montañés	Spain	38	6
Marcel Granollers	Spain	46	7
Carlos Moyá	Spain	48	8

- Rankings as of February 23, 2009.

=== Other entrants ===
The following players received wildcards into the main draw:

- (Mexico) Santiago González
- (Mexico) Bruno Echagaray
- (Argentina) Juan Ignacio Chela

The following players received entry from the qualifying draw:

- (Austria) Daniel Köllerer
- (Uruguay) Pablo Cuevas
- (Spain) Rubén Ramírez Hidalgo
- (France) Olivier Patience

== WTA entrants ==
=== Seeds ===
Athlete	Nationality	Ranking*	Seeding
Venus Williams	United States	5	1
Flavia Pennetta	Italy	15	2
Carla Suárez Navarro	Spain	35	3
Iveta Benešová	Czech Republic	34	4
Gisela Dulko	Argentina	39	5
Lucie Šafářová	Czech Republic	47	6
Tathiana Garbin	Italy	59	7
María José Martínez Sánchez	Spain	53	8

- Rankings as of February 23, 2009.

=== Other entrants ===
The following players received wildcards into the main draw:

- (Belarus) Anna Orlik
- (France) Émilie Loit
- (Mexico) Melissa Torres Sandoval

The following players received entry from the qualifying draw:

- (Romania) Ioana Raluca Olaru
- (Spain) Arantxa Parra Santonja
- (Hungary) Gréta Arn
- (Ukraine) Viktoriya Kutuzova
- (Hungary) Ágnes Szávay (as a lucky loser)
