= 2010 Copa Petrobras Buenos Aires =

Tennis tournament

- Date: 4–11 October
- Edition: 7th
- Location: Buenos Aires, Argentina

Champions

Singles
- (Argentina) Máximo González

Doubles
- (Argentina) Carlos Berlocq / (Argentina) Brian Dabul
← 2009 ·	Copa Petrobras Buenos Aires	· 2011 →

The 2010 Copa Petrobras Buenos Aires was a professional tennis tournament played on red clay courts. It was the seventh edition of the tournament which was part of the 2010 ATP Challenger Tour. It took place in Buenos Aires, Argentina between 4 and 11 October 2010.

== ATP entrants ==
=== Seeds ===
Country	Player	Rank^{1}	Seed
URU	Pablo Cuevas	69	1
ITA	Fabio Fognini	71	2
ARG	Brian Dabul	94	3
ARG	Carlos Berlocq	97	4
POR	Rui Machado	124	5
CHI	Nicolás Massú	128	6
PAR	Ramón Delgado	135	7
ARG	Federico del Bonis	150	8

- Rankings are as of September 27, 2010.

=== Other entrants ===
The following players received wildcards into the singles main draw:

- (Argentina) Facundo Argüello
- (Brazil) Guilherme Clézar
- (Italy) Fabio Fognini
- (Argentina) Agustín Velotti

The following players received entry from the qualifying draw:

- (Argentina) Juan-Martín Aranguren
- (Argentina) Andrés Molteni
- (Argentina) Guido Pella
- (Argentina) Marco Trungelliti
- (Romania) Cătălin Gârd (Lucky loser replacing Guillermo Alcaide)

== Champions ==
=== Singles ===
(Argentina) Máximo González def. (Uruguay) Pablo Cuevas, 6–4, 6–3

=== Doubles ===
(Argentina) Carlos Berlocq / (Argentina) Brian Dabul def. (Chile) Jorge Aguilar / (Argentina) Federico del Bonis, 6–3, 6–2
