= 2009 Abierto Mexicano Telcel – Women's doubles =

Women's doubles
- 2009 Abierto Mexicano Telcel

Final
- Champions: (Spain) Nuria Llagostera Vives (Spain) María José Martínez Sánchez
- Runners-up: (Spain) Lourdes Domínguez Lino (Spain) Arantxa Parra Santonja
- Score: 6–4, 6–2

Events
Singles	men	women
Doubles	men	women
← 2008 ·	Abierto Mexicano Telcel	· 2010 →

Nuria Llagostera Vives and María José Martínez Sánchez were the defending champions, and in the final, defeated Lourdes Domínguez Lino and Arantxa Parra Santonja, 6–4, 6–2.

== Seeds ==
1. (Spain) Nuria Llagostera Vives / (Spain) María José Martínez Sánchez (champions)
2. (Hungary) Ágnes Szávay / (Czech Republic) Vladimíra Uhlířová (first round)
3. (Czech Republic) Iveta Benešová / (Czech Republic) Barbora Záhlavová-Strýcová (semifinals)
4. (Argentina) Gisela Dulko / (Italy) Flavia Pennetta (semifinals)

== Draw ==
=== Key ===
- Q = Qualifier
- WC = Wild card
- LL = Lucky loser
- Alt = Alternate
- SE = Special exempt
- PR = Protected ranking
- ITF = ITF entry
- JE = Junior exempt
- w/o = Walkover
- r = Retired
- d = Defaulted
- SR = Special ranking

=== Draw ===
First round
1	(Spain) N Llagostera Vives (Spain) MJ Martínez Sánchez	w/o
(Romania) IR Olaru (Portugal) F Piedade
(United Kingdom) S Borwell (United States) C Nagle	1	6	[10]
(Slovenia) A Klepač (Romania) A Szatmári	6	3	[7]
3	(Czech Republic) I Benešová (Czech Republic) B Záhlavová-Strýcová	2	7	[10]
(Argentina) B Jozami (Germany) M Müller	6	5	[4]
(United States) J Craybas (Romania) E Gallovits	7	2	[10]
(Czech Republic) P Cetkovská (Czech Republic) L Šafářová	5	6	[3]
(United States) C Fusano (South Africa) N Grandin	5	4
(Ukraine) O Savchuk (Turkey) İ Şenoğlu	7	6
(France) É Loit (Argentina) ME Salerni	3	3
4	(Argentina) G Dulko (Italy) F Pennetta	6	6
(Estonia) M Ani (Ukraine) M Koryttseva
(Spain) L Domínguez Lino (Spain) A Parra Santonja	w/o
WC	(Mexico) E Clarke (Mexico) D Múñoz Gallegos	0	6	[10]
2	(Hungary) Á Szávay (Czech Republic) V Uhlířová	6	4	[7]

Quarterfinals
1	(Spain) N Llagostera Vives (Spain) MJ Martínez Sánchez	6	6
(United Kingdom) S Borwell (United States) C Nagle	4	4
3	(Czech Republic) I Benešová (Czech Republic) B Záhlavová-Strýcová	6	6
(United States) J Craybas (Romania) E Gallovits	1	2
(Ukraine) O Savchuk (Turkey) İ Şenoğlu	4	1
4	(Argentina) G Dulko (Italy) F Pennetta	6	6
(Spain) L Domínguez Lino (Spain) A Parra Santonja	6	6
WC	(Mexico) E Clarke (Mexico) D Múñoz Gallegos	3	3

Semifinals
1	(Spain) N Llagostera Vives (Spain) MJ Martínez Sánchez	6	6
3	(Czech Republic) I Benešová (Czech Republic) B Záhlavová-Strýcová	2	1
4	(Argentina) G Dulko (Italy) F Pennetta	3	4
(Spain) L Domínguez Lino (Spain) A Parra Santonja	6	6

Final
1	(Spain) N Llagostera Vives (Spain) MJ Martínez Sánchez	6	6
(Spain) L Domínguez Lino (Spain) A Parra Santonja	4	2
