= 2009 Abierto Mexicano Telcel – Women's singles =

Women's singles
- 2009 Abierto Mexicano Telcel

Final
- Champion: (United States) Venus Williams
- Runner-up: (Italy) Flavia Pennetta
- Score: 6–1, 6–2

Details
- Draw: 32
- Seeds: 8

Events
Singles	men	women
Doubles	men	women
- Abierto Mexicano Telcel

Flavia Pennetta was the defending champion, but lost in the final to Venus Williams, 6–1, 6–2.

== Seeds ==
1. (United States) Venus Williams (champion)
2. (Italy) Flavia Pennetta (final)
3. (Spain) Carla Suárez Navarro (second round)
4. (Czech Republic) Iveta Benešová (semifinals)
5. (Argentina) Gisela Dulko (second round)
6. (Czech Republic) Lucie Šafářová (first round)
7. (Italy) Tathiana Garbin (second round, retired due to abdominal strain)
8. (Spain) María José Martínez Sánchez (second round)

== Draw ==
Key

- Q = Qualifier
- WC = Wild card
- LL = Lucky loser
- Alt = Alternate
- ITF = ITF entry
- PR = Protected ranking
- SR = Special ranking
- SE = Special exempt
- JE = Junior exempt
- JR = Junior Accelerator Programme entrant
- CO = College Accelerator Programme entrant
- NG = Next Gen Accelerator Program entrant
- w/o = Walkover
- r = Retired
- d = Defaulted

=== Finals ===
Semifinals
1	(United States) Venus Williams	6	6
(Czech Republic) Barbora Záhlavová-Strýcová	0	3
4	(Czech Republic) Iveta Benešová	3	3
2	(Italy) Flavia Pennetta	6	6

Final
1	(United States) Venus Williams	6	6
2	(Italy) Flavia Pennetta	1	2

=== Top half ===
First round
1	(United States) V Williams	6	4	6
(Spain) N Llagostera Vives	4	6	2
Q	(Hungary) G Arn	6	6
(Romania) E Gallovits	2	3
LL	(Hungary) Á Szávay	7	7
WC	(Belarus) A Orlik	5	5
(Italy) R Vinci	6	6
6	(Czech Republic) L Šafářová	4	4
3	(Spain) C Suárez Navarro	7	6
Q	(Ukraine) V Kutuzova	5	3
(Czech Republic) B Záhlavová-Strýcová	2	6	6
(Slovenia) A Klepač	6	1	4
(Estonia) M Ani	4	7	6
(Austria) P Mayr	6	6^{1}	4
Q	(Romania) IR Olaru	3	2
5	(Argentina) G Dulko	6	6

Second round
1	(United States) V Williams	6	6^{3}	6
Q	(Hungary) G Arn	3	7	4
LL	(Hungary) Á Szávay	7	6
(Italy) R Vinci	6^{1}	4
3	(Spain) C Suárez Navarro	4	5
(Czech Republic) B Záhlavová-Strýcová	6	7
(Estonia) M Ani	7	6
5	(Argentina) G Dulko	6^{6}	3

Quarterfinals
1	(United States) V Williams	6	5	6
LL	(Hungary) Á Szávay	2	7	1
(Czech Republic) B Záhlavová-Strýcová	4	7	6
(Estonia) M Ani	6	5	1

Semifinals
1	(United States) V Williams	6	6
(Czech Republic) B Záhlavová-Strýcová	0	3

=== Bottom half ===
First round
7	(Italy) T Garbin	7	4	6
(United States) J Craybas	6^{4}	6	3
(Paraguay) R de los Ríos	4	1
(France) M Johansson	6	6
WC	(France) É Loit	6	4	5
(Czech Republic) K Zakopalová	4	6	7
(Ukraine) O Savchuk	2	0
4	(Czech Republic) I Benešová	6	6
8	(Spain) MJ Martínez Sánchez	6	6
Q	(Spain) A Parra Santonja	2	3
(Czech Republic) P Cetkovská	6	6
(Spain) L Domínguez Lino	2	2
(France) P Parmentier	6	6
WC	(Mexico) M Torres Sandoval	2	3
(Ukraine) M Koryttseva	3	1
2	(Italy) F Pennetta	6	6

Second round
7	(Italy) T Garbin
(France) M Johansson	w/o
(Czech Republic) K Zakopalová	6	4	6^{3}
4	(Czech Republic) I Benešová	4	6	7
8	(Spain) MJ Martínez Sánchez	6	4	1
(Czech Republic) P Cetkovská	3	6	6
(France) P Parmentier	1	3
2	(Italy) F Pennetta	6	6

Quarterfinals
(France) M Johansson	1	3
4	(Czech Republic) I Benešová	6	6
(Czech Republic) P Cetkovská	6	3	0
2	(Italy) F Pennetta	2	6	6

Semifinals
4	(Czech Republic) I Benešová	3	3
2	(Italy) F Pennetta	6	6
