= 2007 Abierto Mexicano Telcel =

- Date: February 26 – March 3
- Edition: 14th (men) / 7th (women)
- Surface: Clay / Outdoor
- Location: Acapulco, Mexico

Champions

Men's singles
- (Argentina) Juan Ignacio Chela

Women's singles
- (France) Émilie Loit

Men's doubles
- (Italy) Potito Starace / (Argentina) Martín Vassallo Argüello

Women's doubles
- (Spain) Lourdes Domínguez Lino / (Spain) Arantxa Parra Santonja
- Mexican Open

The 2007 Abierto Mexicano Telcel was a tennis tournament played on outdoor clay courts. It was the 14th edition of the men's tournament (7th for the women) of the Abierto Mexicano Telcel, and was part of the International Series Gold of the 2007 ATP Tour, and of the Tier III Series of the 2007 WTA Tour. Both the men's and the women's events took place at the Fairmont Acapulco Princess in Acapulco, Mexico, from February 26 through March 3, 2007.

The men's draw was led by former World No. 1, Cincinnati Masters and Costa do Sauípe runner-up Juan Carlos Ferrero, Kitzbühel titlist and Auckland semifinalist Agustín Calleri, and Buenos Aires semifinalist Nicolás Almagro. Other seeded players were defending finalist and Costa do Sauípe semifinalist, Juan Ignacio Chela, Stuttgart doubles winner Gastón Gaudio, Nicolás Massú, José Acasuso and Carlos Moyá.

In the women's field were present Tokyo and Quebec City champion Marion Bartoli, Gold Coast semifinalist and Bogotá runner-up Tathiana Garbin, and ITF Bordeaux winner Martina Müller. Other seeds were Bangkok and Quebec City semifinalist Séverine Brémond, 2005 Acapulco champion and Bogotá semifinalist Flavia Pennetta, Gisela Dulko, Sybille Bammer and Nicole Pratt.

== Finals ==
=== Men's singles ===
(Argentina) Juan Ignacio Chela defeated (Spain) Carlos Moyá, 6–3, 7–6^{(7–2)}

- It was Juan Ignacio Chela's 1st title of the year, and his 4th overall.

=== Women's singles ===
(France) Émilie Loit defeated (Italy) Flavia Pennetta, 7–6^{(7–0)}, 6–4

- It was Émilie Loit's 1st title of the year, and her 3rd overall.

=== Men's doubles ===
(Italy) Potito Starace / (Argentina) Martín Vassallo Argüello defeated (Czech Republic) Lukáš Dlouhý / (Czech Republic) Pavel Vízner, 6–0, 6–2

=== Women's doubles ===
(Spain) Lourdes Domínguez Lino / (Spain) Arantxa Parra Santonja defeated (France) Émilie Loit / (Australia) Nicole Pratt, 6–3, 6–3
