= 2007 Abierto Mexicano Telcel – Women's singles =

Women's singles
- 2007 Abierto Mexicano Telcel

Final
- Champion: (France) Émilie Loit
- Runner-up: (Italy) Flavia Pennetta
- Score: 7–6^{(7–0)}, 6–4

Details
- Draw: 32
- Seeds: 8

Events
Singles	men	women
Doubles	men	women
- Abierto Mexicano Telcel

Anna-Lena Grönefeld was the defending champion, but chose not to participate that year.

Émilie Loit won in the final 7–6^{(7–0)}, 6–4 against Flavia Pennetta.

== Seeds ==
1. (France) Marion Bartoli (second round)
2. (Italy) Tathiana Garbin (quarterfinals)
3. (Germany) Martina Müller (second round)
4. (France) Séverine Brémond (second round)
5. (Italy) Flavia Pennetta (final)
6. (Argentina) Gisela Dulko (second round)
7. (Austria) Sybille Bammer (first round)
8. (Australia) Nicole Pratt (first round)

== Draw ==
Key

- Q = Qualifier
- WC = Wild card
- LL = Lucky loser
- Alt = Alternate
- ITF = ITF entry
- PR = Protected ranking
- SR = Special ranking
- SE = Special exempt
- JE = Junior exempt
- JR = Junior Accelerator Programme entrant
- CO = College Accelerator Programme entrant
- NG = Next Gen Accelerator Program entrant
- w/o = Walkover
- r = Retired
- d = Defaulted

=== Finals ===
Semifinals
(Germany) Julia Schruff	6	2	1
(France) Émilie Loit	0	6	6
5	(Italy) Flavia Pennetta	6	6
Q	(Italy) Sara Errani	2	4

Final
(France) Émilie Loit	7	6
5	(Italy) Flavia Pennetta	6^{0}	4

=== Top half ===
First round
1	(France) M Bartoli	7	6
(France) C Pin	6^{7}	2
(Germany) J Schruff	5	6	6
(Israel) T Obziler	7	2	2
Q	(Germany) G Arn	6	4	2
(Czech Republic) E Birnerová	2	6	6
WC	(Mexico) M Torres Sandoval	2	6	6
8	(Australia) N Pratt	6	3	3
3	(Germany) M Müller	6	6
(United States) J Craybas	4	3
(France) É Loit	6	6
WC	(Mexico) D Múñoz Gallegos	3	1
(Spain) L Pous Tió	6	7
(Czech Republic) H Šromová	1	5
LL	(Brazil) J Widjaja	2	2
6	(Argentina) G Dulko	6	6

Second round
1	(France) M Bartoli	0	4
(Germany) J Schruff	6	6
(Czech Republic) E Birnerová	4	2
WC	(Mexico) M Torres Sandoval	6	6
3	(Germany) M Müller	2	2
(France) É Loit	6	6
(Spain) L Pous Tió	6^{2}	6^{7}
6	(Argentina) G Dulko	7	7

Quarterfinals
(Germany) J Schruff	6	6
WC	(Mexico) M Torres Sandoval	1	4
(France) É Loit	5	6	6
6	(Argentina) G Dulko	7	4	1

Semifinals
(Germany) J Schruff	6	2	1
(France) É Loit	0	6	6

=== Bottom half ===
First round
5	(Italy) F Pennetta	6	6
(Spain) L Domínguez Lino	3	3
(Italy) R Vinci	6	6
(United States) A Harkleroad	3	3
(Czech Republic) I Benešová	6^{2}	6	3
Q	(France) A Cornet	7	4	6
(Belarus) E Dzehalevich	6^{5}	4
4	(France) S Brémond	7	6
7	(Austria) S Bammer	2	6^{6}
Q	(Italy) S Errani	6	7
WC	(Spain) C Martínez Granados	2	2
(Estonia) K Kanepi	6	6
(Czech Republic) K Zakopalová	7	5	1
Q	(Hungary) Z Gubacsi	5	7	6
(Paraguay) R de los Ríos	6	2	4
2	(Italy) T Garbin	4	6	6

Second round
5	(Italy) F Pennetta	6	6
(Italy) R Vinci	0	2
Q	(France) A Cornet	7	6
4	(France) S Brémond	6^{3}	2
Q	(Italy) S Errani	1	6	6
(Estonia) K Kanepi	6	3	4
Q	(Hungary) Z Gubacsi	4	0	r
2	(Italy) T Garbin	6	3

Quarterfinals
5	(Italy) F Pennetta	7	6
Q	(France) A Cornet	5	4
Q	(Italy) S Errani	5	7	6
2	(Italy) T Garbin	7	6^{3}	3

Semifinals
5	(Italy) F Pennetta	6	6
Q	(Italy) S Errani	2	4
