= 2007 Abierto Mexicano Telcel – Women's doubles =

Women's doubles
- 2007 Abierto Mexicano Telcel

Final
- Champion: (Spain) Lourdes Domínguez Lino (Spain) Arantxa Parra Santonja
- Runner-up: (France) Émilie Loit (Australia) Nicole Pratt
- Score: 6-3, 6-3

Events
Singles	men	women
Doubles	men	women
← 2006 ·	Abierto Mexicano Telcel	· 2008 →

Anna-Lena Grönefeld and Meghann Shaughnessy were the defending champions, but neither chose to participate that year.

== Seeds ==
1. (Argentina) Gisela Dulko / (United States) Ashley Harkleroad (quarterfinals)
2. (France) Émilie Loit / (Australia) Nicole Pratt (final)
3. (Italy) Flavia Pennetta / (Italy) Roberta Vinci (semifinals)
4. (Czech Republic) Lucie Hradecká / (Czech Republic) Hana Šromová (first round)

== Draw ==
=== Key ===
- Q = Qualifier
- WC = Wild card
- LL = Lucky loser
- Alt = Alternate
- SE = Special exempt
- PR = Protected ranking
- ITF = ITF entry
- JE = Junior exempt
- w/o = Walkover
- r = Retired
- d = Defaulted
- SR = Special ranking

=== Draw ===
First round
1	(Argentina) G Dulko (United States) A Harkleroad	6	6
(Spain) N Llagostera Vives (Spain) M Marrero	3	3
(United States) J Ditty (United States) C Fusano	3	7^{7}	[5]
(Czech Republic) E Birnerová (Czech Republic) B Záhlavová-Strýcová	6	6^{4}	[10]
4	(Czech Republic) L Hradecká (Czech Republic) H Šromová	5	5
(Spain) L Domínguez Lino (Spain) A Parra Santonja	7	7
WC	(Mexico) E Clarke (Mexico) D Múñoz Gallegos	4	1
(New Zealand) L Baker (Australia) N Kriz	6	6
(Brazil) MF Alves (Brazil) J Cortez	3	1
(Hungary) K Nagy (France) C Pin	6	6
(Argentina) MJ Argeri (Brazil) L Sobral	2	1
3	(Italy) F Pennetta (Italy) R Vinci	6	6
(Czech Republic) G Navrátilová (Czech Republic) M Paštiková	6	3	[6]
(Czech Republic) I Benešová (Spain) C Martínez Granados	0	6	[10]
(France) S Brémond (Germany) M Müller	2	2
2	(France) É Loit (Australia) N Pratt	6	6

Quarterfinals
1	(Argentina) G Dulko (United States) A Harkleroad	6	6^{4}	[10]
(Czech Republic) E Birnerová (Czech Republic) B Záhlavová-Strýcová	0	7^{7}	[12]
(Spain) L Domínguez Lino (Spain) A Parra Santonja	6	7
(New Zealand) L Baker (Australia) N Kriz	2	5
(Hungary) K Nagy (France) C Pin	1	4
3	(Italy) F Pennetta (Italy) R Vinci	6	6
(Czech Republic) I Benešová (Spain) C Martínez Granados	4	0
2	(France) É Loit (Australia) N Pratt	6	6

Semifinals
(Czech Republic) E Birnerová (Czech Republic) B Záhlavová-Strýcová	6	4	[6]
(Spain) L Domínguez Lino (Spain) A Parra Santonja	3	6	[10]
3	(Italy) F Pennetta (Italy) R Vinci	2	6	[6]
2	(France) É Loit (Australia) N Pratt	6	2	[10]

Final
(Spain) L Domínguez Lino (Spain) A Parra Santonja	6	6
2	(France) É Loit (Australia) N Pratt	3	3
