= 2008 Abierto Mexicano Telcel – Women's doubles =

Women's doubles
- 2008 Abierto Mexicano Telcel

Final
- Champions: (Spain) Nuria Llagostera Vives (Spain) María José Martínez Sánchez
- Runners-up: (Czech Republic) Iveta Benešová (Czech Republic) Petra Cetkovská
- Score: 6–2, 6–4

Events
Singles	men	women
Doubles	men	women
← 2007 ·	Abierto Mexicano Telcel	· 2009 →

Lourdes Domínguez Lino and Arantxa Parra Santonja were the defending champions, but were forced to withdraw due to a right foot injury for Domínguez Lino, before their quarterfinals match against Nuria Llagostera Vives and María José Martínez Sánchez

Nuria Llagostera Vives and María José Martínez Sánchez won in the final 6–2, 6–4, against Iveta Benešová and Petra Cetkovská.

== Seeds ==
1. (Italy) Maria Elena Camerin / (Italy) Flavia Pennetta (semifinals)
2. (Spain) Lourdes Domínguez Lino / (Spain) Arantxa Parra Santonja (quarterfinals, withdrew due to a right foot injury for Domínguez Lino)
3. (Croatia) Jelena Kostanić Tošić / (Germany) Martina Müller (first round)
4. (United States) Jill Craybas / (Poland) Klaudia Jans (quarterfinals)

== Draw ==
=== Key ===
- Q = Qualifier
- WC = Wild card
- LL = Lucky loser
- Alt = Alternate
- SE = Special exempt
- PR = Protected ranking
- ITF = ITF entry
- JE = Junior exempt
- w/o = Walkover
- r = Retired
- d = Defaulted
- SR = Special ranking

=== Draw ===
First round
1	(Italy) ME Camerin (Italy) F Pennetta	6	6
WC	(Mexico) V Pulido (Mexico) M Torres Sandoval	1	2
(Italy) S Errani (Italy) G Gabba	6	6
(Colombia) C Castaño (Spain) M Marrero	2	4
4	(United States) J Craybas (Poland) K Jans	6	6
(Romania) E Gallovits (Poland) A Rosolska	2	3
(Czech Republic) I Benešová (Czech Republic) P Cetkovská	6	6
(Russia) E Bychkova (Austria) Y Meusburger	1	4
(Canada) M-È Pelletier (France) C Pin	6	7
(United States) C Fusano (United States) R Kops-Jones	2	5
(Argentina) J Cravero (Argentina) B Jozami	6	6
3	(Croatia) J Kostanić Tošić (Germany) M Müller	4	4
(Spain) N Llagostera Vives (Spain) MJ Martínez Sánchez	6	6
(Japan) R Fujiwara (Argentina) M Irigoyen	4	2
(Germany) T Malek (Germany) J Schruff	7	1	[8]
2	(Spain) L Domínguez Lino (Spain) A Parra Santonja	6^{7}	6	[10]

Quarterfinals
1	(Italy) ME Camerin (Italy) F Pennetta	7	6
(Italy) S Errani (Italy) G Gabba	6^{3}	1
4	(United States) J Craybas (Poland) K Jans	3	3
(Czech Republic) I Benešová (Czech Republic) P Cetkovská	6	6
(Canada) M-È Pelletier (France) C Pin	0	r
(Argentina) J Cravero (Argentina) B Jozami	5
(Spain) N Llagostera Vives (Spain) MJ Martínez Sánchez	w/o
2	(Spain) L Domínguez Lino (Spain) A Parra Santonja

Semifinals
1	(Italy) ME Camerin (Italy) F Pennetta	6	3	[6]
(Czech Republic) I Benešová (Czech Republic) P Cetkovská	3	6	[10]
(Argentina) J Cravero (Argentina) B Jozami	1	1
(Spain) N Llagostera Vives (Spain) MJ Martínez Sánchez	6	6

Final
(Czech Republic) I Benešová (Czech Republic) P Cetkovská	2	4
(Spain) N Llagostera Vives (Spain) MJ Martínez Sánchez	6	6
