= 2008 Abierto Mexicano Telcel – Women's singles =

Women's singles
- 2008 Abierto Mexicano Telcel

Final
- Champion: (Italy) Flavia Pennetta
- Runner-up: (France) Alizé Cornet
- Score: 6–0, 4–6, 6–1

Details
- Draw: 32
- Seeds: 8

Events
Singles	men	women
Doubles	men	women
- Abierto Mexicano Telcel

Émilie Loit was the defending champion, but chose not to participate that year.

Flavia Pennetta won in the final 6–0, 4–6, 6–1, against Alizé Cornet.

== Seeds ==
1. (Italy) Flavia Pennetta (champion)
2. (France) Alizé Cornet (final)
3. (Czech Republic) Klára Zakopalová (second round)
4. (Germany) Martina Müller (first round)
5. (Italy) Sara Errani (second round)
6. (Austria) Yvonne Meusburger (second round)
7. (Estonia) Kaia Kanepi (semifinals)
8. (Romania) Edina Gallovits (quarterfinals)

== Draw ==
Key

- Q = Qualifier
- WC = Wild card
- LL = Lucky loser
- Alt = Alternate
- ITF = ITF entry
- PR = Protected ranking
- SR = Special ranking
- SE = Special exempt
- JE = Junior exempt
- JR = Junior Accelerator Programme entrant
- CO = College Accelerator Programme entrant
- NG = Next Gen Accelerator Program entrant
- w/o = Walkover
- r = Retired
- d = Defaulted

=== Finals ===
Semifinals
1	(Italy) Flavia Pennetta	6	6
7	(Estonia) Kaia Kanepi	4	2
(United States) Jill Craybas	2	2
2	(France) Alizé Cornet	6	6

Final
1	(Italy) Flavia Pennetta	6	4	6
2	(France) Alizé Cornet	0	6	1

=== Top half ===
First round
1	(Italy) F Pennetta	6	6
(Russia) E Bychkova	4	1
(Germany) J Schruff	6	6^{6}	7
(Hungary) G Arn	2	7	6^{5}
(Czech Republic) P Cetkovská	6	7
(Argentina) ME Salerni	2	5
WC	(Mexico) D Múñoz Gallegos	1	0
8	(Romania) E Gallovits	6	6
4	(Germany) M Müller	2	4
(France) O Sanchez	6	6
(Romania) S Cîrstea	5	7	7
Q	(Argentina) J Cravero	7	5	6^{2}
(Spain) L Domínguez Lino	7	6
(Japan) R Fujiwara	5	3
Q	(Spain) A Parra Santonja	4	3
7	(Estonia) K Kanepi	6	6

Second round
1	(Italy) F Pennetta	6	6
(Germany) J Schruff	2	3
(Czech Republic) P Cetkovská	4	3
8	(Romania) E Gallovits	6	6
(France) O Sanchez	1	5
(Romania) S Cîrstea	6	7
(Spain) L Domínguez Lino	7	1	3
7	(Estonia) K Kanepi	6^{1}	6	6

Quarterfinals
1	(Italy) F Pennetta	7	6
8	(Romania) E Gallovits	6^{4}	1
(Romania) S Cîrstea	2	6	6^{6}
7	(Estonia) K Kanepi	6	4	7

Semifinals
1	(Italy) F Pennetta	6	6
7	(Estonia) K Kanepi	4	2

=== Bottom half ===
First round
6	(Austria) Y Meusburger	6	7
Q	(Slovakia) M Rybáriková	4	6^{4}
WC	(Sweden) N Roma	1	1
(Czech Republic) I Benešová	6	6
(United States) J Craybas	6	6
(Paraguay) R de los Ríos	2	2
Q	(Spain) MJ Martínez Sánchez	6	3	1
3	(Czech Republic) K Zakopalová	4	6	6
5	(Italy) S Errani	6	6
(Germany) T Malek	3	3
(Ukraine) M Koryttseva	6	3	6
(France) C Pin	2	6	0
WC	(Mexico) M Torres Sandoval	3	7	7
(Italy) ME Camerin	6	5	5
(Croatia) J Kostanić Tošić	5	3
2	(France) A Cornet	7	6

Second round
6	(Austria) Y Meusburger	1	5
(Czech Republic) I Benešová	6	7
(United States) J Craybas	6	4	7
3	(Czech Republic) K Zakopalová	1	6	6^{2}
5	(Italy) S Errani	5	1
(Ukraine) M Koryttseva	7	6
WC	(Mexico) M Torres Sandoval	2	0
2	(France) A Cornet	6	6

Quarterfinals
(Czech Republic) I Benešová	4	1
(United States) J Craybas	6	6
(Ukraine) M Koryttseva	4	0
2	(France) A Cornet	6	6

Semifinals
(United States) J Craybas	2	2
2	(France) A Cornet	6	6

== Qualifying ==
=== Qualifying seeds ===
1. (Colombia) Catalina Castaño (first round)
2. (Spain) ~~Nuria Llagostera Vives~~ (withdrew)
3. (Argentina) Jorgelina Cravero (qualified)
4. (Spain) María José Martínez Sánchez (qualified)
5. (Spain) ~~Carla Suárez Navarro~~ (withdrew)
6. (Canada) Marie-Ève Pelletier (qualifying competition)
7. (United States) Raquel Kops-Jones (qualifying competition)
8. (Colombia) Mariana Duque Mariño (first round)
9. (Spain) Marta Marrero (qualifying competition)
10. (Slovakia) Magdaléna Rybáriková (qualified)

=== Qualifiers ===
1. (Spain) Arantxa Parra Santonja
2. (Slovakia) Magdaléna Rybáriková
3. (Argentina) Jorgelina Cravero
4. (Spain) María José Martínez Sánchez

=== Qualifying draw ===
==== First qualifier ====
First round					Qualifying competition
1	(Colombia) Catalina Castaño	6	3	1
	(Italy) Giulia Gabba	1	6	6	(Italy) Giulia Gabba	4	6^{3}
	(Spain) Arantxa Parra Santonja	7	6		(Spain) Arantxa Parra Santonja	6	7^{7}
8	(Colombia) Mariana Duque Mariño	5	2

==== Second qualifier ====
First round				Qualifying competition
6	(Canada) Marie-Ève Pelletier	6	6
	(Romania) Ágnes Szatmári	2	2	6	(Canada) Marie-Ève Pelletier	3	4
	(Argentina) María Irigoyen	4	2	10	(Slovakia) Magdaléna Rybáriková	6	6
10	(Slovakia) Magdaléna Rybáriková	6	6

==== Third qualifier ====
First round				Qualifying competition
3	(Argentina) Jorgelina Cravero	6	6
	(Poland) Klaudia Jans	2	1	3	(Argentina) Jorgelina Cravero	6	6
WC	(Mexico) Valeria Pulido	6^{5}	4	7	(United States) Raquel Kops-Jones	3	4
7	(United States) Raquel Kops-Jones	7^{7}	6

==== Fourth qualifier ====
First round				Qualifying competition
4	(Spain) María José Martínez Sánchez	6	6
	(Poland) Alicja Rosolska	1	3	4	(Spain) María José Martínez Sánchez	6	6
WC	(Mexico) Ximena Hermoso	2	1	9	(Spain) Marta Marrero	3	3
9	(Spain) Marta Marrero	6	6
