= Copa Petrobras Buenos Aires =

Copa Petrobras Argentina

Defunct tennis tournament
- Location: Buenos Aires, Argentina
- Venue: Vilas Club (now Racket Club)
- Category: ATP Challenger Series
- Surface: Clay / Outdoors
- Draw: 32S/32Q/16D
- Prize money: $75,000
- Website: Official Website

The Copa Petrobras Argentina was a tennis tournament held in Buenos Aires, Argentina since 2004. The event is part of the challenger series and is played on outdoor clay courts.

== Past finals ==
=== Singles ===
| Year | Champion | Runner-up | Score |
|---|---|---|---|
| 2010 | (Argentina) Máximo González | (Uruguay) Pablo Cuevas | 6–4, 6–3 |
| 2009 | (Argentina) Horacio Zeballos | (Argentina) Gastón Gaudio | 6–2, 3–6, 6–3 |
| 2008 | (Argentina) Martín Vassallo Argüello | (Spain) Rubén Ramírez Hidalgo | 6–3, 4–6, 7–5 |
| 2007 | (Argentina) Sergio Roitman | (Brazil) Marcos Daniel | 6–1, 6–4 |
| 2006 | (Argentina) Guillermo Cañas | (Argentina) Martín Vassallo Argüello | 6–3, 6–4 |
| 2005 | (Argentina) Carlos Berlocq | (Argentina) Diego Hartfield | 7–5, 3–6, 6–4 |
| 2004 | (Austria) Oliver Marach | (Argentina) Diego Moyano | 6–2, 6–3 |

=== Doubles ===
| Year | Champion | Runner-up | Score |
|---|---|---|---|
| 2010 | (Argentina) Carlos Berlocq (Argentina) Brian Dabul | (Chile) Jorge Aguilar (Argentina) Federico Delbonis | 6–3, 6–2 |
| 2009 | (Argentina) Brian Dabul (Argentina) Sergio Roitman | (Argentina) Lucas Arnold Ker (Argentina) Máximo González | 6–7(4), 6–0, [10–8] |
| 2008 | (Argentina) Máximo González (Argentina) Sebastián Prieto | (Brazil) Thomaz Bellucci (Spain) Rubén Ramírez Hidalgo | 7–5, 6–3 |
| 2007 | (Brazil) Marcelo Melo (Argentina) Sebastián Prieto | (Argentina) Brian Dabul (Argentina) Máximo González | 6–4, 7–6 |
| 2006 | (Brazil) André Ghem (Brazil) Flávio Saretta | (Germany) Tomas Behrend (Spain) Marcel Granollers | 6–1, 6–4 |
| 2005 | (Argentina) Lucas Arnold Ker (Argentina) Sebastián Prieto | (Spain) Rubén Ramírez Hidalgo (Spain) Santiago Ventura | 6–0, 6–4 |
| 2004 | (Italy) Enzo Artoni (Argentina) Ignacio González King | (Romania) Victor Ioniță (Romania) Gabriel Moraru | 7–5, 6–3 |
