= Sebastián Prieto (tennis) =

Argentine tennis player

- Country (sports): Argentina
- Residence: Buenos Aires, Argentina
- Born: 19 May 1975 (age 51) Buenos Aires, Argentina
- Height: 1.80 m (5 ft 11 in)
- Turned pro: 1996
- Plays: Right-handed
- Prize money: US$1,271,907

Singles
- Career record: 4–12
- Career titles: 0; 3 Challenger, 1 Futures
- Highest ranking: No. 137 (18 May 1998)

Grand Slam singles results
- Australian Open: Q2 (2000)
- French Open: Q3 (2000)
- Wimbledon: Q1 (1999, 2000, 2002)
- US Open: Q2 (1998, 1999)

Doubles
- Career record: 202–210
- Career titles: 10; 28 Challenger, 0 Futures
- Highest ranking: No. 22 (10 July 2006)

Grand Slam doubles results
- Australian Open: 3R (2006)
- French Open: QF (2003)
- Wimbledon: 3R (2006)
- US Open: 3R (2003)

Team competitions
- Davis Cup: 1–2

Coaching career (2010–present)
- Juan Martín del Potro (2017–2020)

Sebastián Prieto (Spanish pronunciation: [seβasˈtjam ˈpɾjeto]; (Note: In isolation, Sebastián is pronounced [seβasˈtjan].) born 19 May 1975) is an Argentine former professional tennis player. Primarily a doubles specialist, Prieto has won ten doubles titles in his career. He began playing for the Argentina Davis Cup team in 1999.

Prieto coached Juan Martín del Potro from 2017 to 2020.

== ATP career finals ==
=== Doubles: 26 (10 titles, 16 runner-ups) ===
Legend Grand Slam Tournaments (0–0) ATP World Tour Finals (0–0) ATP Masters Series (0–0) ATP Championship Series (1–0) ATP World Series (9–16)	Finals by surface Hard (0–1) Clay (10–15) Grass (0–0) Carpet (0–0)	Finals by setting Outdoors (10–15) Indoors (0–1)

Result	W/L	Date	Tournament	Surface	Partner	Opponents	Score
Loss	0–1	Aug 1996	San Marino, San Marino	Clay	(Argentina) Mariano Hood	(Argentina) Pablo Albano (Argentina) Lucas Arnold Ker	1–6, 3–6
Loss	0–2	Aug 1998	San Marino, San Marino	Clay	(Argentina) Mariano Hood	(Czech Republic) Jiří Novák (Czech Republic) David Rikl	4–6, 6–7
Win	1–2	Nov 1998	Santiago, Chile	Clay	(Argentina) Mariano Hood	(Italy) Massimo Bertolini (United States) Devin Bowen	7–6, 6–7, 7–6
Win	2–2	Oct 1999	Palermo, Italy	Clay	(Argentina) Mariano Hood	(South Africa) Lan Bale (Spain) Alberto Martín	6–3, 6–1
Win	3–2	Feb 2001	Bogotá, Colombia	Clay	(Argentina) Mariano Hood	(Argentina) Martín Rodríguez (Brazil) André Sá	6–2, 6–4
Loss	3–3	Feb 2001	Viña del Mar, Chile	Clay	(Argentina) Mariano Hood	(Spain) Tomás Carbonell (Argentina) Lucas Arnold Ker	4–6, 6–2, 3–6
Loss	3–4	Feb 2001	Buenos Aires, Argentina	Clay	(Argentina) Mariano Hood	(Spain) Tomás Carbonell (Argentina) Lucas Arnold Ker	7–5, 5–7, 6–7^{(5–7)}
Win	4–4	Feb 2003	Buenos Aires, Argentina	Clay	(Argentina) Mariano Hood	(Argentina) Lucas Arnold Ker (Argentina) David Nalbandian	6–2, 6–2
Loss	4–5	May 2004	Barcelona, Spain	Clay	(Argentina) Mariano Hood	(The Bahamas) Mark Knowles (Canada) Daniel Nestor	6–4, 3–6, 4–6
Loss	4–6	Aug 2004	Sopot, Poland	Clay	(Argentina) Martín García	(Czech Republic) František Čermák (Czech Republic) Leoš Friedl	6–2, 2–6, 3–6
Loss	4–7	Feb 2005	Buenos Aires, Argentina	Clay	(Argentina) José Acasuso	(Czech Republic) František Čermák (Czech Republic) Leoš Friedl	2–6, 5–7
Loss	4–8	Jul 2005	Båstad, Sweden	Clay	(Argentina) José Acasuso	(Sweden) Jonas Björkman (Sweden) Joachim Johansson	2–6, 3–6
Win	5–8	Jul 2005	Stuttgart, Germany	Clay	(Argentina) José Acasuso	(Argentina) Mariano Hood (Spain) Tommy Robredo	7–6^{(7–4)}, 6–3
Loss	5–9	Aug 2005	Sopot, Poland	Clay	(Argentina) Lucas Arnold Ker	(Poland) Mariusz Fyrstenberg (Poland) Marcin Matkowski	6–7^{(7–9)}, 4–6
Win	6–9	Sep 2005	Bucharest, Romania	Clay	(Argentina) José Acasuso	(Romania) Victor Hănescu (Romania) Andrei Pavel	6–3, 4–6, 6–3
Loss	6–10	Oct 2005	Metz, France	Hard	(Argentina) José Acasuso	(France) Michaël Llodra (France) Fabrice Santoro	2–5, 5–3, 4–5^{(4–7)}
Win	7–10	Jan 2006	Viña del Mar, Chile	Clay	(Argentina) José Acasuso	(Czech Republic) František Čermák (Czech Republic) Leoš Friedl	7–6^{(7–2)}, 6–4
Loss	7–11	Aug 2006	Sopot, Poland	Clay	(Argentina) Martín García	(Czech Republic) František Čermák (Czech Republic) Leoš Friedl	3–6, 5–7
Win	8–11	Feb 2007	Buenos Aires, Argentina (2)	Clay	(Argentina) Martín García	(Spain) Albert Montañés (Spain) Rubén Ramírez Hidalgo	6–4, 6–2
Loss	8–12	Apr 2007	Valencia, Spain	Clay	(Switzerland) Yves Allegro	(South Africa) Wesley Moodie (Australia) Todd Perry	5–7, 5–7
Loss	8–13	May 2007	Estoril, Portugal	Clay	(Argentina) Martín García	(Brazil) Marcelo Melo (Brazil) André Sá	6–3, 2–6, [6–10]
Loss	8–14	Jul 2007	Båstad, Sweden	Clay	(Argentina) Martín García	(Sweden) Simon Aspelin (Austria) Julian Knowle	2–6, 4–6
Loss	8–15	Aug 2007	Sopot, Poland	Clay	(Argentina) Martín García	(Poland) Mariusz Fyrstenberg (Poland) Marcin Matkowski	1–6, 1–6
Loss	8–16	Sep 2007	Bucharest, Romania	Clay	(Argentina) Martín García	(Austria) Oliver Marach (Slovakia) Michal Mertiňák	6–7^{(2–7)}, 6–7^{(10)}
Win	9–16	Feb 2008	Viña del Mar, Chile (2)	Clay	(Argentina) José Acasuso	(Argentina) Máximo González (Argentina) Juan Mónaco	6–1, 3–0, ret.
Win	10–16	Feb 2010	Buenos Aires, Argentina (3)	Clay	(Argentina) Horacio Zeballos	(Germany) Simon Greul (Australia) Peter Luczak	7–6^{(7–4)}, 6–3

== ATP Challenger and ITF Futures finals ==
=== Singles: 6 (4–2) ===
Legend ATP Challenger (3–2) ITF Futures (1–0)	Finals by surface Hard (0–0) Clay (4–2) Grass (0–0) Carpet (0–0)

Result	W–L	Date	Tournament	Tier	Surface	Opponent	Score
Loss	0–1	Jun 1997	Cali, Colombia	Challenger	Clay	(Paraguay) Ramón Delgado	3–6, 6–1, 6–7
Win	1–1	Oct 1998	Santiago, Chile	Challenger	Clay	(Netherlands) Peter Wessels	7–5, 6–4
Win	2–1	Sep 1999	Seville, Spain	Challenger	Clay	(Spain) Jacobo Díaz	4–6, 6–2, 6–1
Loss	2–2	Nov 2000	Santiago, Chile	Challenger	Clay	(Argentina) Diego Moyano	3–6, 2–6
Win	3–2	Oct 2001	Brasília, Brazil	Challenger	Clay	(France) Sébastien de Chaunac	6–4, 4–6, 7–6^{(8–6)}
Win	4–2	Nov 2003	Argentina F5, Buenos Aires	Futures	Clay	(Brazil) Júlio Silva	2–6, 7–6^{(8–6)}, 6–4

=== Doubles: 38 (28–10) ===
Legend ATP Challenger (28–8) ITF Futures (0–2)	Finals by surface Hard (4–2) Clay (24–8) Grass (0–0) Carpet (0–0)

Result	W–L	Date	Tournament	Tier	Surface	Partner	Opponents	Score
Win	1–0	Aug 1997	Merano, Italy	Challenger	Clay	(Argentina) Mariano Hood	(Italy) Cristian Brandi (Italy) Filippo Messori	6–1, 4–6, 7–6
Win	2–0	Aug 1997	Santa Cruz, Bolivia	Challenger	Clay	(Argentina) Mariano Hood	(Brazil) Egberto Caldas (Brazil) Adriano Ferreira	7–6, 4–6, 6–3
Win	3–0	Oct 1997	Lima, Peru	Challenger	Clay	(Argentina) Mariano Hood	(Belgium) Kris Goossens (Venezuela) Jimy Szymanski	6–2, 6–1
Loss	3–1	Nov 1997	Palmar, Puerto Rico	Challenger	Clay	(Argentina) Mariano Hood	(Argentina) Lucas Arnold Ker (Argentina) Daniel Orsanic	5–7, 6–3, 3–6
Win	4–1	Dec 1997	Santiago, Chile	Challenger	Clay	(Argentina) Mariano Hood	(Argentina) Diego del Río (Argentina) Mariano Puerta	7–5, 6–1
Loss	4–2	Mar 1998	Salinas, Ecuador	Challenger	Hard	(Argentina) Mariano Hood	(United States) David DiLucia (United States) Michael Sell	6–7, 4–6
Loss	4–3	Aug 1998	Scheveningen, Netherlands	Challenger	Clay	(Argentina) Martín Rodríguez	(Argentina) Agustín Calleri (Sweden) Tobias Hildebrand	2–6, 6–3, 2–6
Win	5–3	Aug 1998	Poznań, Poland	Challenger	Clay	(Argentina) Martín Rodríguez	(Italy) Cristian Brandi (Brazil) Márcio Carlsson	6–3, 6–4
Loss	5–4	Dec 1998	Guadalajara, Mexico	Challenger	Clay	(Argentina) Martín García	(Netherlands) Sander Groen (Lebanon) Ali Hamadeh	4–6, 2–6
Win	6–4	Mar 1999	Salinas, Ecuador	Challenger	Hard	(Argentina) Mariano Hood	(Argentina) Lucas Arnold Ker (Argentina) Daniel Orsanic	6–2, 7–6
Win	7–4	Apr 1999	Nice, France	Challenger	Clay	(Argentina) Martín García	(Czech Republic) Tomáš Cibulec (Czech Republic) Leoš Friedl	7–6, 6–4
Win	8–4	Jun 1999	Maia, Portugal	Challenger	Clay	(Argentina) Mariano Hood	(Portugal) Emanuel Couto (Portugal) Bernardo Mota	6–2, 6–0
Loss	8–5	Oct 1999	São Paulo, Brazil	Challenger	Clay	(Argentina) Mariano Hood	(Brazil) Jaime Oncins (Argentina) Daniel Orsanic	2–6, 2–6
Loss	8–6	Oct 1999	Lima, Peru	Challenger	Clay	(Argentina) Mariano Hood	(Argentina) Pablo Albano (Argentina) Martín García	6–7, 6–3, 3–6
Loss	8–7	Sep 2000	Skopje, Macedonia	Challenger	Clay	(Serbia) Dejan Petrović	(Italy) Enzo Artoni (Argentina) Sergio Roitman	5–7, 7–5, 3–6
Win	9–7	Oct 2000	São Paulo, Brazil	Challenger	Clay	(Argentina) Mariano Hood	(Germany) Tomas Behrend (Spain) Germán Puentes Alcañiz	6–3, 7–6^{(8–6)}
Loss	9–8	Jul 2001	Venice, Italy	Challenger	Clay	(Peru) Luis Horna	(The Bahamas) Mark Merklein (United States) Mitch Sprengelmeyer	4–6, 6–7^{(7–9)}
Win	10–8	Mar 2002	San Luis Potosí, Brazil	Challenger	Clay	(Argentina) Ignacio Hirigoyen	(Belgium) Dick Norman (Bulgaria) Orlin Stanoytchev	walkover
Loss	10–9	May 2002	Ljubljana, Slovenia	Challenger	Clay	(Peru) Luis Horna	(Argentina) Edgardo Massa (Argentina) Mariano Hood	5–7, 1–6
Loss	10–10	May 2002	Budapest, Hungary	Challenger	Clay	(Argentina) Mariano Hood	(Slovakia) Karol Beck (Czech Republic) Jaroslav Levinský	6–3, 4–6, 1–6
Loss	10–11	Jun 2002	Prostějov, Czech Republic	Challenger	Clay	(Argentina) Mariano Hood	(Czech Republic) František Čermák (Czech Republic) Ota Fukárek	3–6, 6–7^{(5–7)}
Loss	10–12	Jul 2002	Scheveningen, Netherlands	Challenger	Clay	(Argentina) Mariano Hood	(Netherlands) Edwin Kempes (Netherlands) Martin Verkerk	4–6, 4–6
Win	11–12	Sep 2002	Maia, Portugal	Challenger	Clay	(Argentina) Sergio Roitman	(Australia) Paul Baccanello (Australia) Todd Perry	6–4, 6–4
Win	12–12	Nov 2002	São Paulo, Brazil	Challenger	Clay	(Argentina) Mariano Hood	(Peru) Luis Horna (Argentina) Sergio Roitman	6–3, 6–4
Win	13–12	Mar 2003	Salinas, Ecuador	Challenger	Hard	(Argentina) Martín García	(Germany) Michael Kohlmann (Israel) Harel Levy	walkover
Win	14–12	Mar 2003	Barletta, Italy	Challenger	Clay	(Argentina) Sergio Roitman	(Italy) Massimo Bertolini (Italy) Giorgio Galimberti	6–3, 3–6, 6–3
Loss	14–13	May 2003	Prague, Czech Republic	Challenger	Clay	(Argentina) Martín García	(Czech Republic) Tomáš Berdych (Czech Republic) Michal Navrátil	4–6, 6–3, 4–6
Win	15–13	Jun 2003	Braunschweig, Germany	Challenger	Clay	(United States) Jim Thomas	(Spain) Juan Ignacio Carrasco (Spain) Albert Montañés	4–6, 6–1, 6–4
Loss	15–14	Nov 2003	Argentina F6, Buenos Aires	Futures	Clay	(Argentina) Diego del Río	(Argentina) Gustavo Marcaccio (Argentina) Andrés Schneiter	2–6, 7–6^{(7–2)}, 4–6
Win	16–14	Apr 2005	Paget, Bermuda	Challenger	Clay	(Australia) Jordan Kerr	(Czech Republic) Michal Tabara (Czech Republic) Tomáš Zíb	walkover
Win	17–14	May 2005	Prague, Czech Republic	Challenger	Clay	(Australia) Jordan Kerr	(United States) Travis Parrott (Netherlands) Rogier Wassen	6–4, 6–3
Loss	17–15	Sep 2005	Szczecin, Poland	Challenger	Clay	(Argentina) Agustín Calleri	(Poland) Mariusz Fyrstenberg (Poland) Marcin Matkowski	2–6, 4–6
Win	18–15	Nov 2005	Buenos Aires, Argentina	Challenger	Clay	(Argentina) Lucas Arnold Ker	(Spain) Rubén Ramírez Hidalgo (Spain) Santiago Ventura	6–0, 6–4
Loss	18–16	Mar 2007	Sunrise, United States	Challenger	Hard	(Argentina) Juan Martín del Potro	(Greece) Konstantinos Economidis (Belgium) Kristof Vliegen	3–6, 4–6
Win	19–16	Oct 2008	Andrezieux, France	Challenger	Hard	(Argentina) Martín García	(Argentina) José Acasuso (Argentina) Diego Hartfield	6–3, 6–1
Win	20–16	Nov 2007	Buenos Aires, Argentina	Challenger	Clay	(Brazil) Marcelo Melo	(Argentina) Brian Dabul (Argentina) Máximo González	6–4, 7–6^{(7–0)}
Win	21–16	Oct 2008	Buenos Aires, Argentina	Challenger	Clay	(Argentina) Máximo González	(Brazil) Thomaz Bellucci (Spain) Rubén Ramírez Hidalgo	7–5, 6–3
Win	22–16	Nov 2008	Lima, Peru	Challenger	Clay	(Peru) Luis Horna	(Paraguay) Ramón Delgado (Brazil) Júlio Silva	6–3, 6–3
Win	23–16	Mar 2009	Santiago, Chile	Challenger	Clay	(Argentina) Horacio Zeballos	(Brazil) Rogério Dutra Silva (Brazil) Flávio Saretta	7–6^{(7–2)}, 6–2
Win	24–16	Mar 2009	Bogotá, Colombia	Challenger	Clay	(Argentina) Horacio Zeballos	(Austria) Alexander Peya (Spain) Fernando Vicente	4–6, 6–1, [11–9]
Win	25–16	Jul 2009	Bogotá, Colombia	Challenger	Clay	(Argentina) Horacio Zeballos	(Brazil) Marcos Daniel (Brazil) Ricardo Mello	6–4, 7–5
Win	26–16	Aug 2009	San Marino, San Marino	Challenger	Clay	(Argentina) Lucas Arnold Ker	(Sweden) Johan Brunström (Netherlands Antilles) Jean-Julien Rojer	7–6^{(7–4)}, 2–6, [10–7]
Win	27–16	Sep 2009	Cali, Colombia	Challenger	Clay	(Argentina) Horacio Zeballos	(Brazil) Ricardo Hocevar (Brazil) João Souza	4–6, 6–3, [10–5]
Win	28–16	Jan 2010	São Paulo, Brazil	Challenger	Hard	(Argentina) Brian Dabul	(Poland) Tomasz Bednarek (Poland) Mateusz Kowalczyk	6–3, 6–3
Loss	28–17	Oct 2010	Montevideo, Uruguay	Challenger	Clay	(Argentina) Máximo González	(Argentina) Carlos Berlocq (Argentina) Brian Dabul	5–7, 3–6
Loss	28–18	Aug 2011	Argentina F11, Neuquén	Futures	Clay	(Argentina) Fabricio Burdisso	(Argentina) Valentin Florez (Argentina) Juan Vazquez-Valenzuela	7–5, 2–6, [8–10]

== Performance timelines ==
Key
W	F	SF	QF	#R	RR	Q#	P#	DNQ	A	Z#	PO	G	S	B	NMS	NTI	P	NH

(W) winner; (F) finalist; (SF) semifinalist; (QF) quarterfinalist; (#R) rounds 4, 3, 2, 1; (RR) round-robin stage; (Q#) qualification round; (P#) preliminary round; (DNQ) did not qualify; (A) absent; (Z#) Davis/Fed Cup Zonal Group (with number indication) or (PO) play-off; (G) gold, (S) silver or (B) bronze Olympic/Paralympic medal; (NMS) not a Masters tournament; (NTI) not a Tier I tournament; (P) postponed; (NH) not held; (SR) strike rate (events won / competed); (W–L) win–loss record.

=== Singles ===
Tournament	1998	1999	2000	2001	2002	2003	SR	W–L	Win%
Grand Slam tournaments
Australian Open	A	Q1	Q2	A	A	Q1	0 / 0	0–0	–
French Open	Q1	Q1	Q3	A	A	A	0 / 0	0–0	–
Wimbledon	A	Q1	Q1	A	Q1	A	0 / 0	0–0	–
US Open	Q2	Q2	Q1	A	Q1	Q1	0 / 0	0–0	–
Win–loss	0–0	0–0	0–0	0–0	0–0	0–0	0 / 0	0–0	–
ATP Tour Masters 1000
Miami	3R	Q1	Q1	A	A	A	0 / 1	1–1	50%
Monte Carlo	A	1R	A	A	A	A	0 / 1	0–1	0%
Win–loss	1–1	0–1	0–0	0–0	0–0	0–0	0 / 2	1–2	33%

=== Doubles ===
Tournament	1998	1999	2000	2001	2002	2003	2004	2005	2006	2007	2008	2009	2010	SR	W–L	Win%
Grand Slam tournaments
Australian Open	A	1R	1R	1R	A	1R	2R	2R	3R	1R	A	1R	1R	0 / 10	4–10	29%
French Open	3R	3R	1R	1R	3R	QF	2R	1R	2R	2R	2R	1R	1R	0 / 13	13–13	0%
Wimbledon	1R	1R	1R	A	1R	2R	2R	1R	3R	2R	1R	1R	1R	0 / 12	5–12	29%
US Open	1R	2R	2R	1R	1R	3R	1R	2R	1R	1R	1R	1R	A	0 / 12	5–12	29%
Win–loss	2–3	3–4	1–4	0–3	2–3	6–4	3–4	2–4	5–4	2–4	1–3	0–4	0–3	0 / 47	27–47	36%
ATP Tour Masters 1000
Indian Wells	A	A	A	A	A	A	2R	1R	1R	1R	1R	A	A	0 / 5	1–5	17%
Miami	3R	1R	2R	1R	A	A	1R	1R	1R	1R	1R	A	A	0 / 9	3–9	25%
Monte Carlo	A	1R	A	Q2	A	A	1R	A	SF	A	1R	A	A	0 / 4	3–4	43%
Rome	A	A	A	2R	A	A	1R	A	2R	1R	A	A	A	0 / 4	2–4	33%
Hamburg	A	A	A	A	A	A	2R	A	1R	A	A	NMS		0 / 2	1–2	33%
Madrid	Not Masters Series				A	A	A	A	1R	A	A	A	A	0 / 1	0–1	0%
Canada	A	A	A	A	A	A	A	A	2R	A	A	A	A	0 / 1	1–1	50%
Cincinnati	A	A	A	A	A	A	A	A	2R	A	A	A	A	0 / 1	1–1	50%
Paris	A	A	A	A	A	A	A	1R	A	A	A	A	A	0 / 1	0–1	0%
Win–loss	2–1	0–2	1–1	1–2	0–0	0–0	2–5	0–3	6–8	0–3	0–3	0–0	0–0	0 / 28	12–28	30%
