= Sergio Roitman =

Argentine tennis player

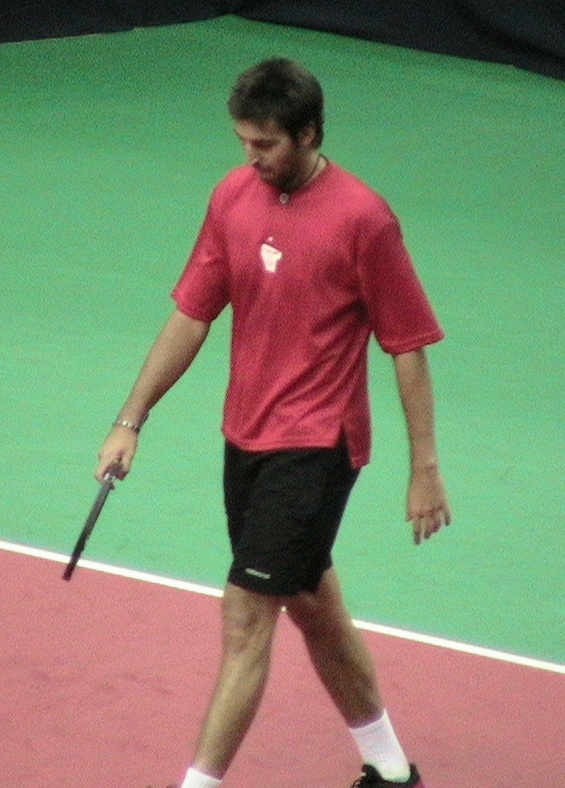
- Country (sports): Argentina
- Residence: Buenos Aires, Argentina
- Born: 16 May 1979 (age 47) Buenos Aires, Argentina
- Height: 1.85 m (6 ft 1 in)
- Turned pro: 1996
- Retired: 2009
- Plays: Right-handed (one-handed backhand)
- Prize money: $1,296,022

Singles
- Career record: 25–62
- Career titles: 0
- Highest ranking: No. 62 (8 October 2007)

Grand Slam singles results
- Australian Open: 1R (2007, 2008)
- French Open: 1R (2003, 2006, 2007, 2008, 2009)
- Wimbledon: 1R (2007, 2008, 2009)
- US Open: 1R (2007, 2008)

Doubles
- Career record: 43–66
- Career titles: 2
- Highest ranking: No. 45 (8 September 2008)

Grand Slam doubles results
- Australian Open: 2R (2007)
- French Open: 3R (2002)
- Wimbledon: 1R (2001, 2002, 2003, 2009)
- US Open: SF (2008)
- Last updated on: 8 July 2021.

Sergio Andres Roitman (born 16 May 1979), nicknamed 'Motoneta' (Scooter in Spanish) is a retired professional tennis player from Argentina.

He achieved a career-high rankings of world No. 62 in singles in October 2007, and world No. 45 in doubles in September 2008.

He won several Challenger and Futures singles titles in his career. In addition, Roitman won two ATP doubles titles – at Amsterdam in 2000, and Umag in 2001.

== Early and personal life ==
Roitman was born in Buenos Aires, Argentina, and is Jewish. Roitman, along with Dudi Sela, Diego Schwartzman, and Camila Giorgi was one of a number of recent Jewish tennis players ranked in the top 100.

His father (Hugo) is an executive salesman for a plastic enterprise company, and his mother (Lidia) is a retired financial adviser. He has an older brother who teaches tennis, named Ivan.

Roitman studied classical piano between the ages of 6 and 12, but chose tennis instead. At the age of 17, he was at a Hermética concert and was shot in the stomach with a rubber bullet. He speaks Spanish, Portuguese, English and Italian.

== Tennis career ==
Roitman began playing tennis at age 10 and turned professional in 1996.

Between 1998 and 2000 Roitman won seven futures singles titles, all of them in South America on clay. On 2000-07-23 he won the ATP doubles title with fellow countryman Andrés Schneiter in Amsterdam in his debut at that level.

In 2001, once again with Schneiter, he won his second ATP doubles title in Umag. Roitman won four Challenger singles titles between 2002 and 2005, in the process defeating Rafael Nadal 6–3, 6–7, 6–4 in the $50,000 ATP Challenger final in Cherbourg in 2003. At the 2003 Roland Garros Roitman played defending champion Albert Costa in the first round and was leading 2 sets to 0 and 4–1 (with a break point for 5–1), but ended up losing in 5 sets.

2006 saw Roitman finish in the Top 100 of ATP rankings for the first time in his career, he compiled a 41–19 match record, and won two titles in Challenger action. In November he won the title at Challengers in Aracaju and Guayaquil.

2007 was the most successful season for Roitman, where he reached his highest ranking and finished in the top 75 for the second straight year, highlighted by a career-best 11 ATP match wins and three Challenger titles. In June he captured the Prostějov Challenger title. In September he picked up another Challenger title in Szczecin, Poland. He closed the season with the title at the Buenos Aires Challenger. He had wins over world # 41 José Acasuso of Argentina, 7–6 (4), 6–1, in Buenos Aires, Argentina. In April he defeated world # 76 Jan Hernych, 7–5, 7–6 (7), in Valencia, Spain, and world # 29 Jürgen Melzer of Austria on clay, 3–6, 6–1, 6–4 in Monte Carlo. In June he beat world # 28 Philipp Kohlschreiber of Germany, 6–2, Ret, in 's-Hertogenbosch, The Netherlands on grass. In July he defeated world # 65 Nicolás Massú of Chile 7–5, 6–2, and twice defeated world # 18 (and 20) Juan Ignacio Chela of Argentina 5–7, 6–3, 6–4, and 6–1, 6–2, on clay.

In the 2009 Buenos Aires tournament Roitman lost 6–0, 6–0 to Juan Mónaco. In June 2009 at Wimbledon, he retired from his first round match due to a recurring injury to the acromion in his right shoulder.

On September 25, 2009, he announced that the Copa Petrobas Challenger in Buenos Aires would be his last professional tournament, citing injuries as the main reason for his retirement.

== Career after retiring from tennis ==
After retiring from tennis, in 2015 Roitman and two partners started a company (GO Events) that supplies turnkey customized accommodations, cleaning staff, drivers, mobiles, and services for media work teams attending large-scale sporting events.

== ATP career finals ==
=== Doubles: 2 (2 titles) ===
Legend (doubles) Grand Slam (0–0) ATP World Tour Finals (0–0) ATP Masters Series (0–0) ATP Championship Series (0–0) ATP World Series (2–0)	Finals by surface Hard (0–0) Clay (2–0) Grass (0–0) Carpet (0–0)	Finals by setting Outdoor (2–0) Indoor (0–0)

Result	W–L	Date	Tournament	Tier	Surface	Partner	Opponents	Score
Win	1–0	Jul 2000	Amsterdam, Netherlands	World Series	Clay	(Argentina) Andrés Schneiter	(Netherlands) Edwin Kempes (Netherlands) Dennis van Scheppingen	4–6, 6–4, 6–1
Win	2–0	Jul 2001	Umag, Croatia	World Series	Clay	(Argentina) Andrés Schneiter	(Croatia) Ivan Ljubičić (Croatia) Lovro Zovko	6–2, 7–5

== ATP Challenger and ITF Futures finals ==
=== Singles: 32 (17–15) ===
Legend ATP Challenger (10–10) ITF Futures (7–5)	Finals by surface Hard (1–0) Clay (16–15) Grass (0–0) Carpet (0–0)

Result	W–L	Date	Tournament	Tier	Surface	Opponent	Score
Win	1–0	Jul 1998	Brazil F1, Londrina	Futures	Clay	(Brazil) Paulo Taicher	6–3, 6–4
Loss	1–1	Aug 1998	Ecuador F1, Guayaquil	Futures	Clay	(Peru) Luis Horna	1–6, 6–7
Loss	1–2	Aug 1998	Ecuador F3, Ibarra	Futures	Clay	(Colombia) Miguel Tobón	1–6, 2–6
Win	2–2	Nov 1998	Paraguay F2, Asunción	Futures	Clay	(Peru) Alejandro Aramburú Acuña	6–1, 6–3
Win	3–2	Nov 1998	Paraguay F3, Asunción	Futures	Clay	(Spain) Ivan Rodrigo-Marin	6–2, 2–6, 6–3
Win	4–2	Sep 1999	Peru F3, Lima	Futures	Clay	(Greece) Solon Peppas	6–3, 7–5
Loss	4–3	Oct 1999	Bolivia F2, Cochabamba	Futures	Clay	(Argentina) Rodrigo Cerdera	6–3, 3–6, 5–7
Loss	4–4	Nov 1999	Argentina F5, Lanús	Futures	Clay	(Argentina) Mariano Delfino	6–7, 3–6
Win	5–4	Apr 2000	Chile F4, Santiago	Futures	Clay	(Colombia) Mauricio Hadad	6–4, 6–3
Win	6–4	May 2000	Chile F6, Santiago	Futures	Clay	(Chile) Adrián García	6–3, 6–3
Win	7–4	May 2000	Argentina F4, Mendoza	Futures	Clay	(Argentina) José Acasuso	1–6, 7–6^{(7–2)}, 6–2
Loss	7–5	Aug 2000	Bressanone, Italy	Challenger	Clay	(Czech Republic) František Čermák	7–5, 4–6, 1–6
Loss	7–6	Apr 2001	Argentina F3, Santa Fe	Futures	Clay	(Argentina) Leonardo Olguín	6–1, 2–6, 5–7
Loss	7–7	Aug 2001	Brasília, Brazil	Challenger	Clay	(Argentina) Gastón Etlis	5–7, 3–6
Win	8–7	Aug 2002	Saint Petersburg, Russia	Challenger	Clay	(Russia) Andrei Stoliarov	7–6^{(7–3)}, 6–2
Win	9–7	Mar 2003	Cherbourg, France	Challenger	Hard	(Spain) Rafael Nadal	6–3, 5–7, 6–4
Loss	9–8	Apr 2004	San Luis Potosí, Mexico	Challenger	Clay	(Argentina) Mariano Delfino	4–6, 4–6
Win	10–8	Jun 2005	Barcelona, Spain	Challenger	Clay	(Russia) Teymuraz Gabashvili	6–2, 6–3
Win	11–8	Sep 2005	Freudenstadt, Germany	Challenger	Clay	(Italy) Flavio Cipolla	7–5, 6–4
Loss	11–9	Apr 2006	Aguascalientes, Mexico	Challenger	Clay	(Argentina) Juan Martín del Potro	6–3, 4–6, 3–6
Loss	11–10	Jul 2006	Reggio Emilia, Italy	Challenger	Clay	(France) Olivier Patience	4–6, 7–5, 2–6
Loss	11–11	Aug 2006	San Marino, San Marino	Challenger	Clay	(Spain) Albert Montañés	6–7^{(5–7)}, 7–6^{(7–5)}, 3–6
Win	12–11	Nov 2006	Aracaju, Brazil	Challenger	Clay	(Serbia and Montenegro) Boris Pashanski	6–1, 6–3
Win	13–11	Nov 2006	Guayaquil, Ecuador	Challenger	Clay	(Argentina) Mariano Zabaleta	6–3, 4–6, 6–1
Win	14–11	Jun 2007	Prostějov, Czech Republic	Challenger	Clay	(Germany) Florian Mayer	7–6^{(7–1)}, 6–4
Win	15–11	Sep 2007	Szczecin, Poland	Challenger	Clay	(Czech Republic) Ivo Minář	6–2, 7–5
Win	16–11	Nov 2007	Buenos Aires, Argentina	Challenger	Clay	(Brazil) Marcos Daniel	6–1, 6–4
Loss	16–12	Jun 2008	Braunschweig, Germany	Challenger	Clay	(France) Nicolas Devilder	4–6, 4–6
Loss	16–13	Aug 2008	Graz, Austria	Challenger	Clay	(France) Jérémy Chardy	2–6, 1–6
Win	17–13	Nov 2008	Guayaquil, Ecuador	Challenger	Clay	(Argentina) Brian Dabul	7–6, 6–4
Loss	17–14	Nov 2008	Medellín, Colombia	Challenger	Clay	(Argentina) Leonardo Mayer	4–6, 5–7
Loss	17–15	Nov 2008	Lima, Peru	Challenger	Clay	(Argentina) Martín Vassallo Argüello	2–6, 6–4, 4–6

=== Doubles: 48 (29–19) ===
Legend ATP Challenger (23–17) ITF Futures (6–2)	Finals by surface Hard (0–2) Clay (29–17) Grass (0–0) Carpet (0–0)

Result	W–L	Date	Tournament	Tier	Surface	Partner	Opponents	Score
Loss	0–1	Aug 1998	Ecuador F1, Guayaquil	Futures	Clay	(Argentina) Rodrigo Pena	(Peru) Luis Horna (United States) Rudy Rake	4–6, 1–6
Win	1–1	Aug 1999	Uruguay F2, Jose-Ignacio	Futures	Clay	(Argentina) Andres Zingman	(Argentina) Patricio Arquez (Argentina) Emiliano Redondi	6–3, 6–1
Win	2–1	Sep 1999	Peru F2, Lima	Futures	Clay	(Argentina) Enzo Artoni	(Peru) Iván Miranda (Peru) Américo Venero	6–4, 6–2
Loss	2–2	Oct 1999	Bolivia F2, Cochabamba	Futures	Clay	(Argentina) Rodrigo Pena	(Chile) Adrián García (Chile) Jaime Fillol	3–6, 6–4, 3–6
Win	3–2	Oct 1999	Paraguay F3, Asunción	Futures	Clay	(Argentina) Enzo Artoni	(Argentina) Daniel Caracciolo (Argentina) Leonardo Olguín	6–4, 6–4
Win	4–2	Mar 2000	Chile F2, Temuco	Futures	Clay	(Argentina) Eduardo Medica	(Uruguay) Alejandro Olivera (Brazil) Júlio Silva	6–4, 6–4
Win	5–2	Mar 2000	Chile F3, Santiago	Futures	Clay	(Argentina) Eduardo Medica	(Brazil) Adriano Ferreira (Brazil) Flávio Saretta	6–3, 6–2
Win	6–2	May 2000	Argentina F4, Mendoza	Futures	Clay	(Argentina) Juan Pablo Guzmán	(Argentina) Juan Pablo Brzezicki (Chile) Miguel Miranda	6–3, 6–4
Win	7–2	Aug 2000	Sopot, Poland	Challenger	Clay	(Argentina) Andrés Schneiter	(Spain) Oscar Hernandez (Spain) Germán Puentes Alcañiz	6–4, 6–2
Win	8–2	Sep 2000	Budapest, Hungary	Challenger	Clay	(Argentina) Andrés Schneiter	(Czech Republic) David Miketa (Czech Republic) David Škoch	6–3, 6–3
Win	9–2	Sep 2000	Skopje, Macedonia	Challenger	Clay	(Argentina) Enzo Artoni	(Australia) Dejan Petrovic (Argentina) Sebastián Prieto	7–5, 5–7, 6–3
Loss	9–3	Nov 2000	Buenos Aires, Argentina	Challenger	Clay	(Argentina) Andrés Schneiter	(Argentina) Lucas Arnold Ker (Argentina) Pablo Albano	3–6, 6–4, 2–6
Win	10–3	Apr 2001	San Luis Potosí, Mexico	Challenger	Clay	(Argentina) Edgardo Massa	(Australia) Paul Hanley (Australia) Nathan Healey	6–4, 5–7, 7–6^{(7–3)}
Win	11–3	May 2001	Budapest, Hungary	Challenger	Clay	(Brazil) Daniel Melo	(Australia) Jordan Kerr (South Africa) Damien Roberts	6–2, 6–4
Loss	11–4	Jul 2001	Budaörs, Hungary	Challenger	Clay	(Argentina) Andrés Schneiter	(Czech Republic) Petr Dezort (Czech Republic) Radomír Vašek	3–6, 7–5, 6–7^{(6–8)}
Loss	11–5	Aug 2001	Ribeirão Preto, Brazil	Challenger	Clay	(Argentina) Andrés Schneiter	(Brazil) Adriano Ferreira (Brazil) Antonio Prieto	1–6, 7–6^{(8–6)}, 4–6
Loss	11–6	May 2002	Rome, Italy	Challenger	Clay	(Argentina) Andrés Schneiter	(Romania) Gabriel Trifu (Belarus) Vladimir Voltchkov	1–6, 2–6
Loss	11–7	Jun 2002	Weiden, Germany	Challenger	Clay	(Argentina) Andrés Schneiter	(Germany) Jens Knippschild (Federal Republic of Yugoslavia) Dušan Vemić	6–7^{(5–7)}, 2–6
Loss	11–8	Jul 2002	Oberstaufen, Germany	Challenger	Clay	(Argentina) Patricio Arquez	(Chile) Jaime Fillol (Brazil) Ricardo Schlachter	2–6, 4–6
Win	12–8	Sep 2002	Brindisi, Italy	Challenger	Clay	(Argentina) Mariano Delfino	(Spain) Marc López (Spain) Salvador Navarro	7–6^{(7–4)}, 6–7^{(3–7)}, 6–4
Win	13–8	Sep 2002	Budapest, Hungary	Challenger	Clay	(Australia) Paul Baccanello	(Norway) Jan Frode Andersen (Germany) Oliver Gross	6–4, 6–7^{(5–7)}, 6–5 ret.
Win	14–8	Sep 2002	Maia, Portugal	Challenger	Clay	(Argentina) Sebastián Prieto	(Australia) Paul Baccanello (Australia) Todd Perry	6–4, 6–4
Loss	14–9	Nov 2002	São Paulo, Brazil	Challenger	Clay	(Peru) Luis Horna	(Argentina) Mariano Hood (Argentina) Sebastián Prieto	3–6, 4–6
Loss	14–10	Nov 2002	Knoxville, United States	Challenger	Hard	(United States) Hugo Armando	(Russia) Dmitry Tursunov (Netherlands) Martin Verkerk	3–6, 4–6
Win	15–10	Mar 2003	Barletta, Italy	Challenger	Clay	(Argentina) Sebastián Prieto	(Italy) Massimo Bertolini (Italy) Giorgio Galimberti	6–3, 3–6, 6–3
Loss	15–11	Jun 2003	Prostějov, Czech Republic	Challenger	Clay	(Spain) Rubén Ramírez Hidalgo	(Czech Republic) Jaroslav Levinský (Czech Republic) David Škoch	2–6, 2–6
Loss	15–12	Oct 2003	Seville, Spain	Challenger	Clay	(Italy) Enzo Artoni	(Spain) Oscar Hernandez (Spain) Albert Portas	4–6, 6–4, 4–6
Loss	15–13	Oct 2003	Barcelona, Spain	Challenger	Clay	(Italy) Enzo Artoni	(Spain) Juan Ignacio Carrasco (Argentina) Mariano Delfino	5–7, 3–6
Win	16–13	Sep 2004	Kyiv, Ukraine	Challenger	Clay	(Spain) Albert Portas	(Russia) Igor Kunitsyn (Russia) Yuri Schukin	6–1, 6–1
Win	17–13	Nov 2004	Bogotá, Colombia	Challenger	Clay	(Spain) Santiago Ventura	(United Kingdom) Richard Barker (Germany) Frank Moser	7–5, 6–4
Loss	17–14	Dec 2004	Guadalajara, Mexico	Challenger	Clay	(Spain) Rubén Ramírez Hidalgo	(Mexico) Alejandro Hernández (Mexico) Santiago González	6–7^{(5–7)}, 6–1, 3–6
Loss	17–15	Mar 2005	Salinas, Ecuador	Challenger	Hard	(Argentina) Juan Pablo Guzmán	(Argentina) Juan Pablo Brzezicki (Argentina) Cristian Villagrán	2–6, 4–6
Win	18–15	May 2005	Turin, Italy	Challenger	Clay	(Brazil) Franco Ferreiro	(Italy) Francesco Aldi (Italy) Alessio di Mauro	6–7^{(4–7)}, 7–5, 7–6^{(7–2)}
Win	19–15	Sep 2005	Genoa, Italy	Challenger	Clay	(Italy) Leonardo Azzaro	(Italy) Marco Pedrini (Italy) Andrea Stoppini	6–1, 6–4
Win	20–15	Sep 2005	Budapest, Hungary	Challenger	Clay	(Italy) Leonardo Azzaro	(Germany) Philipp Petzschner (Germany) Lars Uebel	6–3, 5–7, 6–3
Win	21–15	Nov 2005	Aracaju, Brazil	Challenger	Clay	(Argentina) Máximo González	(Argentina) Carlos Berlocq (Germany) Martín Vassallo Argüello	6–4, 6–7^{(7–9)}, 6–3
Win	22–15	Jan 2006	Santiago, Chile	Challenger	Clay	(Argentina) Máximo González	(Chile) Jorge Aguilar (Chile) Felipe Parada	6–4, 6–3
Win	23–15	Apr 2006	Florianópolis, Brazil	Challenger	Clay	(Argentina) Máximo González	(Brazil) Thiago Alves (Brazil) Júlio Silva	6–2, 3–6, [10–5]
Loss	23–16	May 2006	Prague, Czech Republic	Challenger	Clay	(Paraguay) Ramón Delgado	(Czech Republic) Petr Pála (Czech Republic) David Škoch	0–6, 0–6
Loss	23–17	Jun 2006	Lugano, Switzerland	Challenger	Clay	(Italy) Leonardo Azzaro	(Austria) Oliver Marach (Italy) Giorgio Galimberti	5–7, 3–6
Loss	23–18	Jun 2006	Braunschweig, Germany	Challenger	Clay	(Argentina) Máximo González	(Germany) Tomas Behrend (Germany) Christopher Kas	6–7^{(5–7)}, 4–6
Win	24–18	Aug 2006	San Marino, San Marino	Challenger	Clay	(Argentina) Máximo González	(France) Jérôme Haehnel (France) Julien Jeanpierre	6–3, 6–4
Win	25–18	Oct 2006	Montevideo, Uruguay	Challenger	Clay	(Argentina) Máximo González	(Argentina) Guillermo Cañas (Argentina) Martin García	6–3, 7–6^{(7–5)}
Win	26–18	Nov 2006	Aracaju, Brazil	Challenger	Clay	(Argentina) Máximo González	(Germany) Tomas Behrend (Spain) Marcel Granollers	7–6^{(8–6)}, 3–6, [10–6]
Win	27–18	May 2008	Bordeaux, France	Challenger	Clay	(Argentina) Diego Hartfield	(Poland) Tomasz Bednarek (Serbia) Dušan Vemić	6–4, 6–4
Loss	27–19	Jun 2009	Lugano, Switzerland	Challenger	Clay	(Argentina) Máximo González	(Netherlands Antilles) Jean-Julien Rojer (Sweden) Johan Brunström	walkover
Win	28–19	Jul 2009	Poznań, Poland	Challenger	Clay	(France) Alexandre Sidorenko	(Germany) Michael Kohlmann (Netherlands) Rogier Wassen	6–4, 6–4
Win	29–19	Oct 2009	Buenos Aires, Argentina	Challenger	Clay	(Argentina) Brian Dabul	(Argentina) Máximo González (Argentina) Lucas Arnold Ker	6–7^{(4–7)}, 6–0, [10–8]

== Performance timelines ==
Key
W	F	SF	QF	#R	RR	Q#	DNQ	A	NH

(W) winner; (F) finalist; (SF) semifinalist; (QF) quarterfinalist; (#R) rounds 4, 3, 2, 1; (RR) round-robin stage; (Q#) qualification round; (DNQ) did not qualify; (A) absent; (NH) not held; (SR) strike rate (events won / competed); (W–L) win–loss record.

=== Singles ===
Tournament	2001	2002	2003	2004	2005	2006	2007	2008	2009	SR	W–L	Win%
Grand Slam tournaments
Australian Open	Q2	Q1	A	Q1	A	A	1R	1R	A	0 / 2	0–2	0%
French Open	A	A	1R	Q1	Q2	1R	1R	1R	1R	0 / 5	0–5	0%
Wimbledon	Q1	Q2	A	Q2	Q1	A	1R	1R	1R	0 / 3	0–3	0%
US Open	A	A	Q2	Q1	Q1	A	1R	1R	A	0 / 2	0–2	0%
Win–loss	0–0	0–0	0–1	0–0	0–0	0–1	0–4	0–4	0–2	0 / 12	0–12	0%
ATP Tour Masters 1000
Indian Wells	A	A	A	A	A	Q1	1R	1R	A	0 / 2	0–2	0%
Miami	A	A	A	A	A	A	1R	1R	A	0 / 2	0–2	0%
Monte Carlo	A	A	A	A	A	A	2R	A	A	0 / 1	1–1	50%
Win–loss	0–0	0–0	0–0	0–0	0–0	0–0	1–3	0–2	0–0	0 / 5	1–5	17%

=== Doubles ===
Tournament	2001	2002	2003	2004	2005	2006	2007	2008	2009	SR	W–L	Win%
Grand Slam tournaments
Australian Open	1R	1R	A	A	A	A	2R	1R	A	0 / 4	1–4	20%
French Open	1R	3R	2R	A	A	A	2R	2R	2R	0 / 6	6–6	50%
Wimbledon	1R	1R	1R	A	A	A	A	A	1R	0 / 4	0–4	0%
US Open	2R	A	A	A	A	A	1R	SF	1R	0 / 4	5–4	56%
Win–loss	1–4	2–3	1–2	0–0	0–0	0–0	2–3	5–3	1–3	0 / 18	12–18	40%

== See also ==
- List of select Jewish tennis players
