= Martín Vassallo Argüello =

Argentine tennis player

Martín Vassallo
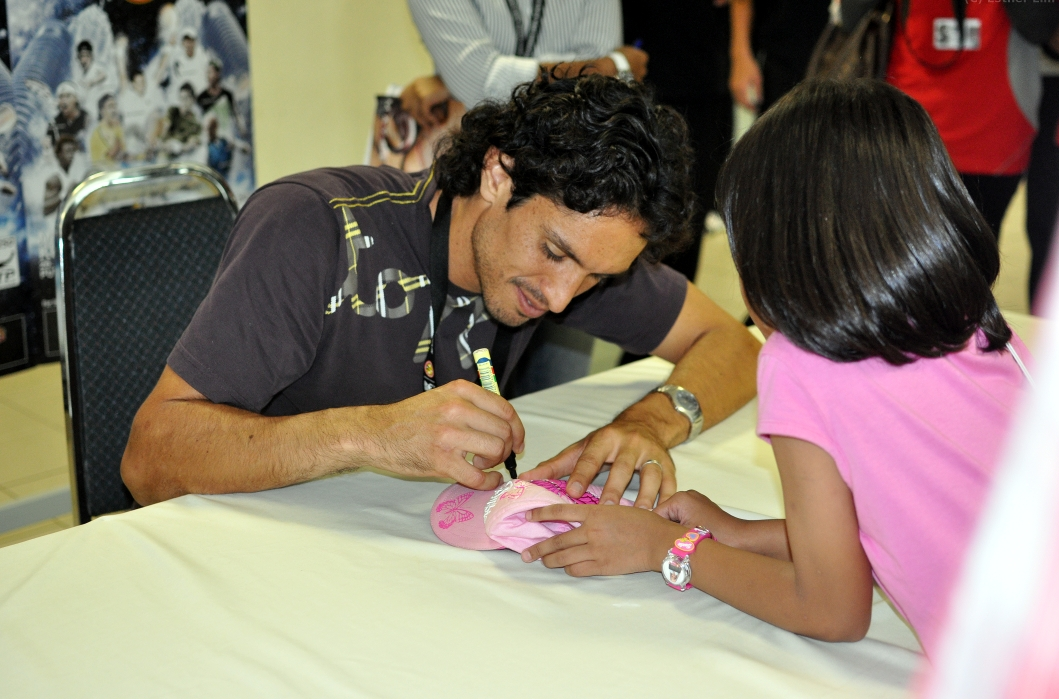
- Vassallo in 2009
- Full name: Martín Miguel Vassallo Argüello
- Country (sports): Argentina
- Residence: Buenos Aires, Argentina
- Born: 10 February 1980 (age 46) Temperley, Argentina
- Height: 1.85 m (6 ft 1 in)
- Turned pro: 1999
- Retired: 2011
- Plays: Right-handed (one-handed backhand)
- Prize money: $1,420,101

Singles
- Career record: 47–81
- Career titles: 0
- Highest ranking: No. 47 (27 April 2009)

Grand Slam singles results
- Australian Open: 1R (2007, 2008, 2009, 2010)
- French Open: 4R (2006)
- Wimbledon: 2R (2008, 2009)
- US Open: 1R (2007, 2008, 2009)

Doubles
- Career record: 20–32
- Career titles: 1
- Highest ranking: No. 71 (25 June 2007)

Grand Slam doubles results
- Australian Open: 2R (2010)
- French Open: 1R (2007, 2009)
- Wimbledon: 1R (2009)
- US Open: 1R (2009)

Martín Miguel Vassallo Argüello (Note: In this Spanish name, the first or paternal surname is Vassallo and the second or maternal family name is Argüello.) (locally [maɾˈtim baˈsaʃo aɾˈɣweʃo]; (Note: In isolation, Martín is pronounced [maɾˈtin].) born 10 February 1980) is a retired professional male tennis player from Argentina. His career-high ATP singles ranking is World No. 47, achieved in April 2009 shortly after reaching the semifinals of Acapulco.

== Tennis career ==
He turned pro in 1999. Over the course of his career, he has represented both Argentina and Italy.

At the 2006 French Open, he reached the fourth round of a Grand Slam event for the first time in his career. He entered the tournament as a qualifier and beat Paul Goldstein of the United States in the first round in straight sets, No. 21 seed Sébastien Grosjean of France in the second round in five sets and Raemon Sluiter of the Netherlands in the third round, also in five sets. In the next round he lost to David Nalbandian.

In late 2007, at the Orange Prokom Open in Sopot, Poland, Argüello was embroiled in a betting scandal after his match against world number four Nikolay Davydenko. The match saw Davydenko retire with the scores at 2–6, 6–3, 2–1. Gamblers betting on the match displayed irregular betting patterns and a total of £3.4m was paid out on it, ten times the normal amount for a match at this level. Eventually, Betfair voided all bets on the match. Neither Argüello nor Davydenko have been formally charged with any offence by the ATP.

According to a BBC report, a follow-up investigation revealed that Argüello had exchanged messages with a Sicilian gambler in 2006, including on the morning of a tennis match which saw the gambler win $86,000. Deleted messages recovered from Argüello's phone included "He doesn't want to do it. He intends to win", followed by "All okay" just before the game.

In 2009, Vassallo made his Davis Cup debut for Argentina in the 5–0 defeat against The Netherlands in Buenos Aires playing doubles with Lucas Arnold Ker and in the reverse singles.

== Singles titles ==
Legend (singles)
Grand Slam (0)
Tennis Masters Cup (0)
ATP Masters Series (0)
ATP Tour (0)
Challengers (8)
Futures (0)

| No. | Date | Tournament | Surface | Opponent in the final | Score |
|---|---|---|---|---|---|
| 1. | 29 April 2002 | Rome | Clay | (Italy) Filippo Volandri | 6–4, 6–0 |
| 2. | 12 May 2003 | Košice | Clay | (Chile) Hermes Gamonal | 6–3, 6–3 |
| 3. | 7 July 2003 | Oberstaufen | Clay | (Italy) Andreas Seppi | 6–1, 6–4 |
| 4. | 28 July 2003 | Trani | Clay | (Spain) Francisco Fogués | 6–3, 7–5 |
| 5. | 22 January 2007 | Santiago | Clay | (Italy) Fabio Fognini | 1–6, 7–5, 6–4 |
| 6. | 6 October 2008 | Asunción | Clay | (Argentina) Leonardo Mayer | 3–6, 6–3, 7–6 |
| 7. | 20 October 2008 | Buenos Aires | Clay | (Spain) Rubén Ramírez Hidalgo | 6–3, 4–6, 7–5 |
| 8. | 29 November 2008 | Lima | Clay | (Argentina) Sergio Roitman | 6–2, 4–6, 6–4 |

== Performance timeline ==
Key
| W | F | SF | QF | #R | RR | Q# | DNQ | A | NH |

(W) winner; (F) finalist; (SF) semifinalist; (QF) quarterfinalist; (#R) rounds 4, 3, 2, 1; (RR) round-robin stage; (Q#) qualification round; (DNQ) did not qualify; (A) absent; (NH) not held; (SR) strike rate (events won / competed); (W–L) win–loss record.

| Tournament | 2002 | 2003 | 2004 | 2005 | 2006 | 2007 | 2008 | 2009 | 2010 | Career W–L |
|---|---|---|---|---|---|---|---|---|---|---|
Grand Slam tournaments
| Australian Open | A | A | A | A | A | 1R | 1R | A | 1R | 0–3 |
| French Open | 1R | A | A | A | 4R | 2R | 2R | 2R | | 6–5 |
| Wimbledon | A | A | 1R | A | A | 1R | 2R | 2R | | 2–4 |
| US Open | A | A | A | A | A | 1R | 1R | 1R | | 0–2 |
| Win–loss | 0–1 | 0–0 | 0–1 | 0–0 | 3–1 | 1–4 | 2–4 | 2–3 | 0–1 | 8–15 |
