= Brian Dabul =

Argentine tennis player (born 1984)

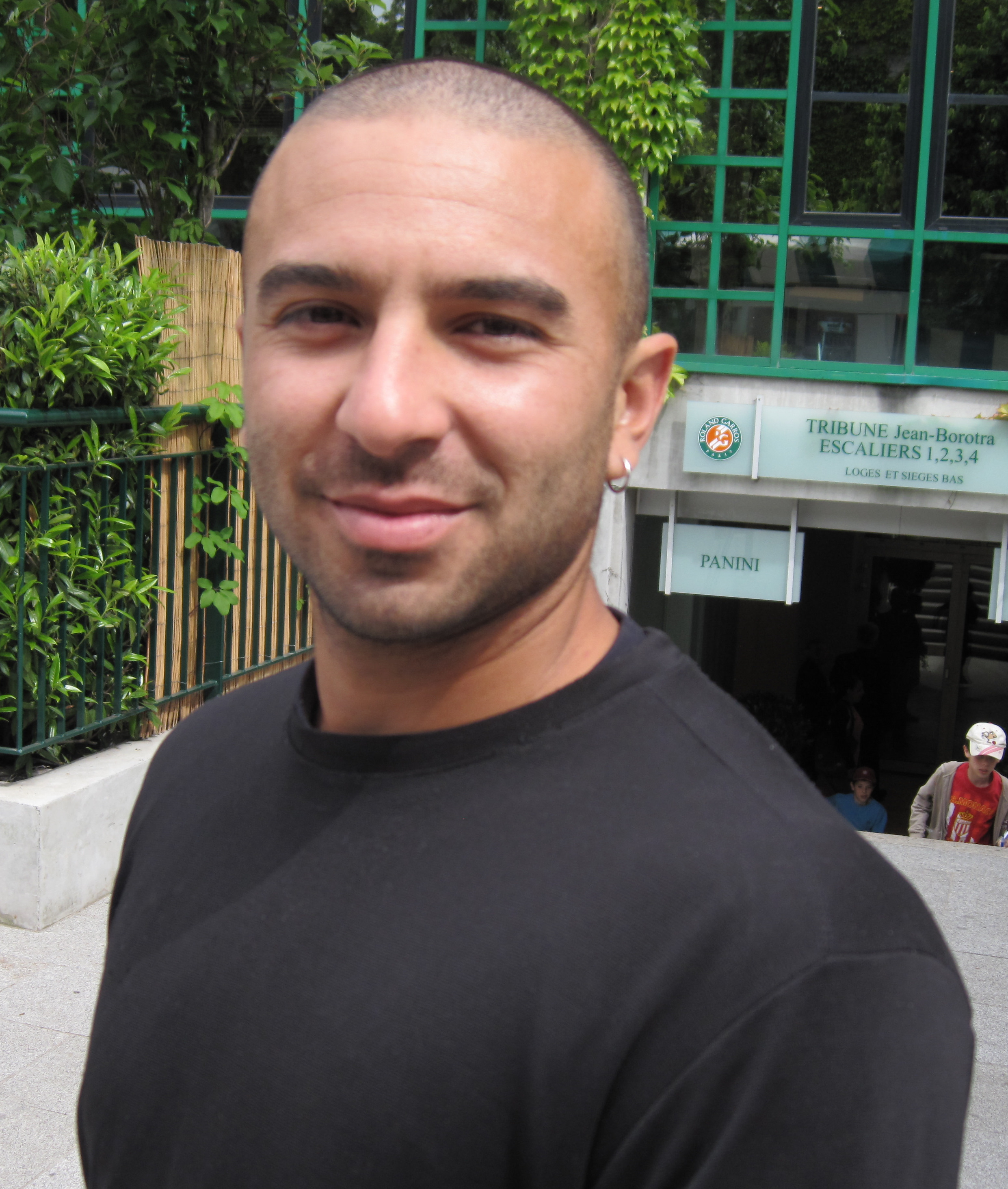
- Country (sports): Argentina
- Residence: Buenos Aires, Argentina
- Born: 24 February 1984 (age 41) Buenos Aires, Argentina
- Height: 1.70 m (5 ft 7 in)
- Turned pro: 2001
- Retired: 2012
- Plays: Left-handed (two-handed backhand)
- Prize money: $728,653

Singles
- Career record: 15–27
- Career titles: 0
- Highest ranking: No. 82 (9 March 2009)

Grand Slam singles results
- Australian Open: 2R (2009)
- French Open: 1R (2009, 2011)
- Wimbledon: 1R (2008, 2009)
- US Open: 1R (2010)

Doubles
- Career record: 8–10
- Career titles: 1
- Highest ranking: No. 79 (11 January 2010)

Brian Dabul (Spanish pronunciation: [ˈbɾaʝan daˈβul]; born 24 February 1984) is an Argentine retired tennis player. He was ranked the No. 1 junior in the world in January 2002. His highest ranking in men's singles was No. 82 (9 March 2009), and his highest ranking in doubles was No. 79 (11 January 2010).

== Early life ==
Dabul was born in Buenos Aires, Argentina, to parents Jorge and Nora, and is Jewish.

== Tennis career ==
=== Juniors ===
During his career as a junior player, Dabul was ranked No. 1 in the world in January 2002 for singles players, as well as achieving No. 5 in doubles.

=== Professional career ===
==== 2003–07 ====
Dabul's climb in the professional ranks was a slow one, not indicative of his status as a former No. 1 Junior player. He broke into the top 500 in 2003, the top 300 in 2004, and entered the top 200 in 2007, finishing that year ranked No. 159.

==== 2008–10 ====
Dabul continued his slow, steady rise in 2008. In March, he reached his career-high ranking in doubles of 88th with some good Challenger results, and then followed that up with a singles Challenger win in San Luis Potosí to reach a career-high in singles of No. 133. Three semi-final appearances in his next 4 Challengers improved his ranking to No. 114 by May, however he failed to qualify into the 2008 French Open. He won the 2009 Chilean Open men's doubles championship with Pablo Cuevas.

Dabul reached the third round of the 2010 Indian Wells Masters after having defeated No. 16 seed Gilles Simon, although lost to eventual champion Ivan Ljubicic.

==== Retirement ====
Dabul announced his retirement in 2012 due to a back injury.

== ATP career finals ==
=== Doubles: 1 (1–0) ===
Legend
Grand Slam tournaments (0–0)
ATP World Tour Finals (0–0)
ATP World Tour Masters 1000 (0–0)
ATP World Tour 500 (0–0)
ATP World Tour 250 (1–0)

Result	W/L	Date	Tournament	Surface	Partner	Opponents	Score
Win	1–0	Feb 2009	Viña del Mar, Chile	Clay	(Uruguay) Pablo Cuevas	(Czech Republic) František Čermák (Slovakia) Michal Mertiňák	6–3, 6–3

== See also ==
- List of select Jewish tennis players
