= 2006 Copa Telmax =

Tennis tournament

- Date: 13–20 February
- Edition: 34th
- Category: International Series
- Draw: 32S / 16D
- Prize money: $400,000
- Surface: Clay / outdoor
- Location: Buenos Aires, Argentina
- Venue: Buenos Aires Lawn Tennis Club

Champions

Singles
- (Spain) Carlos Moyà

Doubles
- (Czech Republic) František Čermák / (Czech Republic) Leoš Friedl
← 2005 ·	ATP Buenos Aires	· 2007 →

The 2006 Copa Telmax was an Association of Tennis Professionals men's tennis tournament that was played on outdoor clay courts and held at the Buenos Aires Lawn Tennis Club in Buenos Aires, Argentina. It was the 34th edition of the event and was part of the International Series of the 2006 ATP Tour. The tournament was held from 13 February through 20 February 2006 and fifth-seeded Carlos Moyà won the singles title.

== Finals ==
=== Singles ===
(Spain) Carlos Moyà defeated (Italy) Filippo Volandri 7–6^{(8–6)}, 6–4

- It was Moyà's only title of the year and the 19th of his career.

=== Doubles ===
(Czech Republic) František Čermák / (Czech Republic) Leoš Friedl defeated (Greece) Vasilis Mazarakis / (Serbia and Montenegro) Boris Pašanski 6–1, 6–2

- It was Čermák's 1st title of the year and the 11th of his career. It was Friedl's 1st title of the year and the 12th of his career.
