= 2005 ATP Buenos Aires =

- Date: 7–14 February
- Edition: 33rd
- Category: ATP International Series
- Draw: 32S/16D
- Prize money: $355,000
- Surface: Clay / outdoor
- Location: Buenos Aires, Argentina
- Venue: Buenos Aires Lawn Tennis Club

Champions

Singles
- (Argentina) Gastón Gaudio

Doubles
- (Czech Republic) František Čermák / (Czech Republic) Leoš Friedl
← 2004 ·	ATP Buenos Aires	· 2006 →

The 2005 ATP Buenos Aires was an Association of Tennis Professionals men's tennis tournament held in Buenos Aires, Argentina. It was the 33rd edition of the event and was part of the International Series of the 2005 ATP Tour. The tournament was played on outdoor clay court and held from 7 February to 14 February 2005. Second-seeded Gastón Gaudio won the singles title.

== Finals ==
=== Singles ===
(Argentina) Gastón Gaudio defeated (Argentina) Mariano Puerta 6–4, 6–4

- It was Gaudio's 2nd title of the year and the 7th of his career.

=== Doubles ===
(Czech Republic) František Čermák / (Czech Republic) Leoš Friedl defeated (Argentina) José Acasuso / (Argentina) Sebastián Prieto 6–2, 7–5

- It was Čermák's 1st title of the year and the 6th of his career. It was Friedl's 1st title of the year and the 6th of his career.
