= 2007 ATP Buenos Aires – Doubles =

Doubles
- 2007 ATP Buenos Aires

Final
- Champions: (Argentina) Martín García (Argentina) Sebastián Prieto
- Runners-up: (Spain) Albert Montañés (Spain) Rubén Ramírez Hidalgo
- Score: 6–4, 6–2

Events
Singles	Doubles
← 2006 ·	ATP Buenos Aires	· 2008 →

František Čermák and Leoš Friedl were the defending champions, but Čermák did not participate this year. Friedl partnered Michael Kohlmann, losing in the first round.

Martín García and Sebastián Prieto won the title, defeating Albert Montañés and Rubén Ramírez Hidalgo 6–4, 6–2 in the final.

== Seeds ==
1. (Czech Republic) Lukáš Dlouhý / (Czech Republic) Pavel Vízner (semifinals)
2. (Poland) Mariusz Fyrstenberg / (Poland) Marcin Matkowski (semifinals)
3. (Czech Republic) Leoš Friedl / (Germany) Michael Kohlmann (first round)
4. (Argentina) Martín García / (Argentina) Sebastián Prieto (champions)

== Draw ==
=== Key ===
- Q = Qualifier
- WC = Wild card
- LL = Lucky loser
- Alt = Alternate
- SE = Special exempt
- PR = Protected ranking
- ITF = ITF entry
- JE = Junior exempt
- w/o = Walkover
- r = Retired
- d = Defaulted
- SR = Special ranking

=== Draw ===
First round
1	(Czech Republic) L Dlouhý (Czech Republic) P Vízner	7^{7}	6^{3}	[11]
(Italy) A di Mauro (Italy) P Starace	6^{3}	7^{7}	[9]
(Czech Republic) T Cibulec (Czech Republic) J Vaněk	2	6^{6}
(Argentina) D Hartfield (Argentina) M Vassallo Argüello	6	7^{8}
3	(Czech Republic) L Friedl (Germany) M Kohlmann	6	3	[8]
(Spain) A Montañés (Spain) R Ramírez Hidalgo	0	6	[10]
(Uruguay) P Cuevas (Italy) S Galvani	6	6
(Spain) N Almagro (Spain) M Granollers-Pujol	3	2
(France) N Devilder (France) O Patience	7	7
(Spain) A Martín (Spain) F Vicente	5	5
WC	(Argentina) E Schwank (Argentina) C Villagrán	4	6	[12]
4	(Argentina) M García (Argentina) S Prieto	6	2	[14]
(Brazil) M Melo (Brazil) A Sá	4	2
WC	(Argentina) C Berlocq (Argentina) B Dabul	6	6
(Argentina) M González (Argentina) S Roitman	6	5	[5]
2	(Poland) M Fyrstenberg (Poland) M Matkowski	4	7	[10]

Quarterfinals
1	(Czech Republic) L Dlouhý (Czech Republic) P Vízner	6	6
(Argentina) D Hartfield (Argentina) M Vassallo Argüello	3	2
(Spain) A Montañés (Spain) R Ramírez Hidalgo	w/o
(Uruguay) P Cuevas (Italy) S Galvani
(France) N Devilder (France) O Patience	3	2
4	(Argentina) M García (Argentina) S Prieto	6	6
WC	(Argentina) C Berlocq (Argentina) B Dabul	5	6	[9]
2	(Poland) M Fyrstenberg (Poland) M Matkowski	7	3	[11]

Semifinals
1	(Czech Republic) L Dlouhý (Czech Republic) P Vízner	2	2
(Spain) A Montañés (Spain) R Ramírez Hidalgo	6	6
4	(Argentina) M García (Argentina) S Prieto	6^{5}	7	[11]
2	(Poland) M Fyrstenberg (Poland) M Matkowski	7^{7}	5	[9]

Final
(Spain) A Montañés (Spain) R Ramírez Hidalgo	4	2
4	(Argentina) M García (Argentina) S Prieto	6	6
