= 2007 ATP Buenos Aires =

- Date: 19–26 February
- Edition: 10th
- Category: International Series
- Draw: 24S (RR) / 16D / 16Q
- Prize money: $420,000
- Surface: Clay / outdoor
- Location: Buenos Aires, Argentina
- Venue: Buenos Aires Lawn Tennis Club

Champions

Singles
- (Argentina) Juan Mónaco

Doubles
- (Argentina) Martín García / (Argentina) Sebastián Prieto
← 2006 ·	ATP Buenos Aires	· 2008 →

The 2007 ATP Buenos Aires was a professional men's tennis tournament that was played on outdoor clay courts at the Buenos Aires Lawn Tennis Club in Buenos Aires, Argentina. It was part of the International Series on the 2007 ATP Tour and was held from 19 February through 26 February 2007. Unseeded Juan Mónaco won the singles title.

This was the fourth tournament of the season (alongside Adelaide, Viña del Mar, Delray Beach and Las Vegas) that implemented a 24-player Round robin tournament for the singles competition, as part of the round-robin trials proposed during this season.

== Singles main draw entrants ==
=== Seeds ===
Country	Player	Rank^{1}	Seed
ARG	David Nalbandian	11	1
ESP	Juan Carlos Ferrero	27	2
ARG	Agustín Calleri	28	3
ESP	Nicolás Almagro	31	4
ESP	Carlos Moyá	36	5
ARG	Gastón Gaudio	37	6
ARG	Juan Ignacio Chela	39	7
ARG	José Acasuso	40	8

- Rankings are as of February 12, 2007.

=== Other entrants ===
The following players received wildcards into the main draw:

- (Argentina) Juan Pablo Guzmán
- (Argentina) Diego Hartfield
- (Argentina) Mariano Zabaleta

The following players received entry from the qualifying draw:

- (Argentina) Carlos Berlocq
- (Argentina) Juan Pablo Brzezicki
- (Germany) Denis Gremelmayr
- (Argentina) Diego Junqueira

The following players received entry as lucky losers:

- (Italy) Stefano Galvani (during the elimination round)
- (Argentina) Carlos Berlocq (during the round robin)
- (Czech Republic) Lukáš Dlouhý (during the round robin)
- (Czech Republic) Jiří Vaněk (during the round robin)

=== Withdrawals ===
During the tournament

- (Argentina) Agustín Calleri (back fibrosis) → replaced by Jiří Vaněk
- (Argentina) Gastón Gaudio (personal reasons) → replaced by Carlos Berlocq
- (Ecuador) Nicolás Lapentti (injured) → replaced by Lukáš Dlouhý

=== Retirements ===
- (Argentina) José Acasuso (right elbow injury)

== Doubles main draw entrants ==
=== Seeds ===
Country	Player	Country	Player	Rank^{1}	Seed
CZE	Lukáš Dlouhý	CZE	Pavel Vízner	32	1
POL	Mariusz Fyrstenberg	POL	Marcin Matkowski	43	2
CZE	Leoš Friedl	GER	Michael Kohlmann	54	3
ARG	Martín García	ARG	Sebastián Prieto	82	4

- ^{1} Rankings are as of February 12, 2007.

=== Other entrants ===
The following pairs received wildcards into the main draw:

- (Argentina) Carlos Berlocq / (Argentina) Brian Dabul
- (Argentina) Eduardo Schwank / (Argentina) Cristian Villagrán

=== Withdrawals ===
- (Uruguay) Pablo Cuevas / (Italy) Stefano Galvani (walkover)

== Finals ==
=== Singles ===
(Argentina) Juan Mónaco defeated (Italy) Alessio di Mauro 6–1, 6–2

- It was Mónaco's 1st title of his career. He would also win other 2 titles during this season, in Pörtschach and Kizbühel.

=== Doubles ===
(Argentina) Martín García / (Argentina) Sebastián Prieto defeated (Spain) Albert Montañés / (Spain) Rubén Ramírez Hidalgo 6–4, 6–2

- It was the 7th title for García and the 8th title for Prieto in their respective careers.
