= 2006 Copa Telmax – Singles =

Singles
- 2006 Copa Telmax

Final
- Champion: (Spain) Carlos Moyà
- Runner-up: (Italy) Filippo Volandri
- Score: 7–6^{(8–6)}, 6–4

Details
- Draw: 32
- Seeds: 8

Events
Singles	Doubles
← 2005 ·	ATP Buenos Aires	· 2007 →

Gastón Gaudio was the defending champion, but did not participate this year.

Carlos Moyà won the title, defeating Filippo Volandri 7–6^{(8–6)}, 6–4 in the final.

== Seeds ==
1. (Argentina) ~~David Nalbandian~~ (withdrew)
2. (Argentina) Guillermo Coria (second round)
3. (Spain) Juan Carlos Ferrero (semifinals)
4. (Argentina) José Acasuso (quarterfinals)
5. (Spain) Carlos Moyà (champion)
6. (Italy) Filippo Volandri (final)
7. (France) Florent Serra (first round)
8. (Argentina) Juan Ignacio Chela (second round)

== Draw ==
=== Key ===
- Q = Qualifier
- WC = Wild card
- LL = Lucky loser
- Alt = Alternate
- SE = Special exempt
- PR = Protected ranking
- ITF = ITF entry
- JE = Junior exempt
- w/o = Walkover
- r = Retired
- d = Defaulted
- SR = Special ranking

=== Finals ===
Semifinals
6	(Italy) Filippo Volandri	6	6
(Argentina) Agustín Calleri	3	4
3	(Spain) Juan Carlos Ferrero	6	6^{3}	4
5	(Spain) Carlos Moyà	3	7^{7}	6

Final
6	(Italy) Filippo Volandri	6^{6}	4
5	(Spain) Carlos Moyà	7^{8}	6

=== Top half ===
First round
Q	(Spain) A Portas	2	5
(Spain) A Martín	6	7
(Serbia and Montenegro) B Pašanski	6	5	7
WC	(Argentina) J P Brzezicki	4	7	5
(Germany) T Behrend	7^{7}	6
(Argentina) C Berlocq	6^{1}	4
(Spain) F Vicente	3	2
6	(Italy) F Volandri	6	6
4	(Argentina) J Acasuso	6	6
(Spain) Montañés	1	3
Q	(Argentina) M Vassallo Argüello	6	6
(Brazil) R Mello	3	3
(Costa Rica) J A Marín	6	6
(Romania) R Sabău	1	1
(Argentina) A Calleri	6	6
7	(France) F Serra	0	4

Second round
(Spain) A Martín	6	6^{5}	3
(Serbia and Montenegro) B Pašanski	3	7^{7}	6
(Germany) T Behrend	6	6^{5}	6^{2}
6	(Italy) F Volandri	3	7^{7}	7^{7}
4	(Argentina) J Acasuso	6	6
Q	(Argentina) M Vassallo Argüello	3	1
(Costa Rica) J A Marín	4	2
(Argentina) A Calleri	6	6

Quarterfinals
(Serbia and Montenegro) B Pašanski	4	3
6	(Italy) F Volandri	6	6
4	(Argentina) J Acasuso	3	6	4
(Argentina) A Calleri	6	3	6

Semifinals
6	(Italy) F Volandri	6	6
(Argentina) A Calleri	3	4

=== Bottom half ===
First round
8	(Argentina) J I Chela	7^{7}
(Peru) L Horna	6^{1}	r
(Argentina) J Mónaco	3	3
(Italy) P Starace	6	6
LL	(Spain) G Fraile	0	6	3
(Brazil) F Saretta	6	4	6
WC	(Argentina) J M del Potro	2	6	4
3	(Spain) J C Ferrero	6	4	6
5	(Spain) C Moyà	6^{6}	6	6
Q	(Italy) F Fognini	7^{8}	4	4
(Brazil) M Daniel	3	7	1
(Chile) N Massú	6	5	6
LL	(Spain) R Ramírez Hidalgo	3	6	6
Q	(France) É Prodon	6	4	2
(Czech Republic) J Vaněk	1	6	6^{2}
2	(Argentina) G Coria	6	2	7^{7}

Second round
8	(Argentina) J I Chela	6	6^{4}	2
(Italy) P Starace	3	7^{7}	6
(Brazil) F Saretta	6	2	3
3	(Spain) J C Ferrero	4	6	6
5	(Spain) C Moyà	4	6	7^{7}
(Chile) N Massú	6	3	6^{4}
LL	(Spain) R Ramírez Hidalgo	7	6
2	(Argentina) G Coria	5	2

Quarterfinals
(Italy) P Starace	3	5
3	(Spain) J C Ferrero	6	7
5	(Spain) C Moyà	6	6
LL	(Spain) R Ramírez Hidalgo	2	2

Semifinals
3	(Spain) J C Ferrero	6	6^{3}	4
5	(Spain) C Moyà	3	7^{7}	6
