= 2007 ATP Buenos Aires – Singles =

Singles
- 2007 ATP Buenos Aires

Final
- Champion: (Argentina) Juan Mónaco
- Runner-up: (Italy) Alessio di Mauro
- Score: 6–1, 6–2

Events
Singles	Doubles
← 2006 ·	ATP Buenos Aires	· 2008 →

Carlos Moyá was the defending champion, but was eliminated in the round robin competition.

Juan Mónaco won the title, defeating Alessio di Mauro 6–1, 6–2 in the final.

== Seeds ==
1. (Argentina) David Nalbandian (round robin)
2. (Spain) Juan Carlos Ferrero (round robin)
3. (Argentina) Agustín Calleri (round robin, withdrew due to a back fibrosis)
4. (Spain) Nicolás Almagro (semifinals)
5. (Spain) Carlos Moyá (round robin)
6. (Argentina) Gastón Gaudio (round robin, withdrew because of personal reasons)
7. (Argentina) Juan Ignacio Chela (quarterfinals)
8. (Argentina) José Acasuso (round robin, retired due to a right elbow injury)

== Draw ==
=== Key ===
- Q = Qualifier
- WC = Wild card
- LL = Lucky loser
- Alt = Alternate
- SE = Special exempt
- PR = Protected ranking
- ITF = ITF entry
- JE = Junior exempt
- w/o = Walkover
- r = Retired
- d = Defaulted
- SR = Special ranking

=== Finals ===
Quarterfinals
(Peru) Luis Horna	6	2	3
(Argentina) Juan Mónaco	4	6	6
4	(Spain) Nicolás Almagro	6	6
7	(Argentina) Juan Ignacio Chela	4	3
(Italy) Alessio di Mauro	1	6	6
(Spain) Albert Montañés	6	4	2
WC	(Argentina) Diego Hartfield	6	7
(France) Nicolas Devilder	4	5

Semifinals
(Argentina) Juan Mónaco	6	7^{7}
4	(Spain) Nicolás Almagro	1	6^{3}
(Italy) Alessio di Mauro	6	6
WC	(Argentina) Diego Hartfield	1	4

Final
(Argentina) Juan Mónaco	6	6
(Italy) Alessio di Mauro	1	2

=== Round robin ===
	Group 1	(Argentina) Nalbandian	(Peru) Horna	(Argentina) Cañas	RR W–L	Set W–L	Game W–L	Standings
1	(Argentina) David Nalbandian		4–6, 3–6	4–6, 4–6	0–2	0–4 (0.0%)	15–24 (38.5%)	3
	(Peru) Luis Horna	6–4, 6–3		4–6, 6–2, 6–2	2–0	4–1 (80.0%)	28–17 (62.2%)	1
SE	(Argentina) Guillermo Cañas	6–4, 6–4	6–4, 2–6, 2–6		1–1	3–2 (60.0%)	22–24 (47.8%)	2

	Group 2	(Spain) Moyá	(Argentina) Mónaco	(Italy) Starace	RR W–L	Set W–L	Game W–L	Standings
5	(Spain) Carlos Moyá		4–6, 7–6^{(7–3)}, 0–6	6–4, 6–4	1–1	3–2 (60.0%)	23–26 (46.9%)	2
	(Argentina) Juan Mónaco	6–4, 6–7^{(3–7)}, 6–0		6–3, 6–4	2–0	4–1 (80.0%)	30–18 (62.5%)	1
	(Italy) Potito Starace	4–6, 4–6	3–6, 4–6		0–2	0–4 (0.0%)	15–24 (38.5%)	3

	Group 3	(Spain) Almagro	(Argentina) Vassallo Argüello	(Italy) Galvani	RR W–L	Set W–L	Game W–L	Standings
4	(Spain) Nicolás Almagro		7–5, 6–4	6–4, 7–6^{(7–2)}	2–0	4–0 (100%)	26–19 (57.8%)	1
	(Argentina) Martín Vassallo Argüello	5–7, 4–6		6–2, 6–4	1–1	2–2 (50.0%)	21–19 (52.5%)	2
LL	(Italy) Stefano Galvani	4–6, 6–7^{(2–7)}	2–6, 4–6		0–2	0–4 (0.0%)	16–25 (39.0%)	3

	Group 4	(Argentina) Chela	(Spain) Martín	(Russia) Andreev	RR W–L	Set W–L	Game W–L	Standings
7	(Argentina) Juan Ignacio Chela		6–1, 6–3	3–6, 7–5, 6–3	2–0	4–1 (80.0%)	28–18 (60.9%)	1
	(Spain) Alberto Martín	1–6, 3–6		3–6, 6–2, 1–6	0–2	1–4 (20.0%)	14–26 (35.0%)	3
	(Russia) Igor Andreev	6–3, 5–7, 3–6	6–3, 2–6, 6–1		1–1	3–3 (50.0%)	28–26 (51.8%)	2

	Group 5	(Argentina) Gaudio (Argentina) Berlocq	(Spain) Ramírez Hidalgo	(Italy) di Mauro	RR W–L	Set W–L	Game W–L	Standings
6 LL	(Argentina) Gastón Gaudio (Argentina) Carlos Berlocq		1–6, 1–6 (w/ Gaudio)	6–1, 6–4 (w/ Berlocq)	0–1; 1–0	0–2 (0.0%); 2–0 (100%)	2–12 (14.3%); 12–5 (70.6%)	X 3
	(Spain) Rubén Ramírez Hidalgo	6–1, 6–1 (w/ Gaudio)		4–6, 6–7^{(8–10)}	1–1	2–2 (50.0%)	22–15 (59.4%)	2
	(Italy) Alessio di Mauro	1–6, 4–6 (w/ Berlocq)	6–4, 7–6^{(10–8)}		1–1	2–2 (50.0%)	18–22 (45.0%)	1

Due to Gaudio's withdrawal from the tournament, di Mauro advanced to Quarterfinals based on head-to-head results against Ramírez Hidalgo.

	Group 6	(Argentina) Calleri (Czech Republic) Vaněk	(Spain) Montañés	(Brazil) Saretta	RR W–L	Set W–L	Game W–L	Standings
3 LL	(Argentina) Agustín Calleri (Czech Republic) Jiří Vaněk		7–6^{(7–4)}, 4–6, 4–6 (w/ Calleri)	6–7^{(8–10)}, 7–6^{(7–2)}, 3–6 (w/ Vaněk)	0–1; 0–1	1–2 (33.3%); 1–2 (33.3%)	15–18 (45.4%); 16–19 (45.7%)	X 3
	(Spain) Albert Montañés	6–7^{(4–7)}, 6–4, 6–4 (w/ Calleri)		6–3, 6–3	2–0	4–1 (80.0%)	30–21 (58.8%)	1
SE	(Brazil) Flávio Saretta	7–6^{(10–8)}, 6–7^{(2–7)}, 6–3 (w/ Vaněk)	3–6, 3–6		1–1	2–3 (40.0%)	25–28 (47.2%)	2

	Group 7	(Argentina) Acasuso	(Argentina) Roitman	(Argentina) Hartfield	RR W–L	Set W–L	Game W–L	Standings
8	(Argentina) José Acasuso		6–7^{(4–7)}, 1–6	3–6, 0–0, ret.	0–2	0–4 (0.0%)	10–19 (34.5%)	3
	(Argentina) Sergio Roitman	7–6^{(7–4)}, 6–1		7–5, 4–6, 6–7^{(4–7)}	1–1	3–2 (60.0%)	30–25 (54.5%)	2
WC	(Argentina) Diego Hartfield	6–3, 0–0, ret.	5–7, 6–4, 7–6^{(7–4)}		2–0	4–1 (80.0%)	24–20 (54.5%)	1

	Group 8	(Spain) Ferrero	(Ecuador) Lapentti (Czech Republic) Dlouhý	(France) Devilder	RR W–L	Set W–L	Game W–L	Standings
2	(Spain) Juan Carlos Ferrero		6–3, 6–3 (w/ Dlouhý)	6–1, 6–7^{(2–7)}, 0–6	1–1	3–2 (60.0%)	24–20 (54.5%)	2
LL	(Ecuador) Nicolás Lapentti (Czech Republic) Lukáš Dlouhý	3–6, 3–6 (w/ Dlouhý)		6–3, 2–6, 6–3 (w/ Lapentti)	1–0; 0–1	2–1 (66.7%); 0–2 (0.0%)	14–12 (53.9%); 6–12 (33.3%)	X 3
	(France) Nicolas Devilder	1–6, 7–6^{(7–2)}, 6–0	3–6, 6–2, 3–6 (w/ Lapentti)		1–1	3–3 (50.0%)	26–26 (50.0%)	1

Due to Lapentti's withdrawal from the tournament, Devilder advanced to Quarterfinals based on head-to-head results against Ferrero.

== Elimination round ==
Prior to the round robin and after the completion of the qualifying draws, the 16 players with the lowest tier in the tournament (4 qualifiers, 3 wild cards, 1 lucky loser, 2 special exempts and 6 based on ATP rankings) competed in the elimination round in order to get one of the 8 last spots into the round robin competition. Winners in this round entered as main entrants.

Main draw elimination round
Event	Winner	Loser	Score
Main Entrant 1	(Italy) Stefano Galvani [LL]	(Argentina) Diego Junqueira [Q]	6–4, 4–6, 7–5
Main Entrant 2	(Italy) Potito Starace	(Argentina) Mariano Zabaleta [WC]	7–6^{(11–9)}, 6–2
Main Entrant 3	(Italy) Alessio di Mauro	(Argentina) Carlos Berlocq [Q] ^{RR-LL}	6–1, 6–3
Main Entrant 4	(Russia) Igor Andreev	(Czech Republic) Jiří Vaněk ^{RR-LL}	6–4, 6–4
Main Entrant 5	(France) Nicolas Devilder	(Argentina) Juan Pablo Brzezicki [Q]	6–3, 5–7, 6–3
Main Entrant 6	(Argentina) Guillermo Cañas [SE]	(Argentina) Juan Pablo Guzmán [WC]	7–6^{(7–4)}, 6–3
Main Entrant 7	(Argentina) Diego Hartfield [WC]	(Germany) Denis Gremelmayr [Q]	7–6^{(7–5)}, 6–1
Main Entrant 8	(Brazil) Flávio Saretta [SE]	(Czech Republic) Lukáš Dlouhý ^{RR-LL}	6–3, 6–1

^{RR-LL}: Berlocq, Vaněk and Dlouhý entered the round robin competition as lucky losers.

== Qualifying ==
=== Seeds ===
1. (Spain) Óscar Hernández (first round, retired)
2. (France) Olivier Patience (first round)
3. (Italy) Stefano Galvani (qualifying competition, lucky loser)
4. (Argentina) Carlos Berlocq (qualified)
5. (Spain) Gorka Fraile (qualifying competition)
6. (Serbia) Boris Pašanski (first round)
7. (Germany) Denis Gremelmayr (qualified)
8. (Italy) Paolo Lorenzi (first round)

=== Qualifiers ===
1. (Germany) Denis Gremelmayr
2. (Argentina) Diego Junqueira
3. (Argentina) Juan Pablo Brzezicki
4. (Argentina) Carlos Berlocq

=== Lucky loser ===
1. (Italy) Stefano Galvani

=== Qualifying draw ===
==== First qualifier ====
First round
1	(Spain) Óscar Hernández	2	0^{r}
WC	(Argentina) Guido Pella	6	0
(Spain) Pablo Andújar	3	6^{10}
7	(Germany) Denis Gremelmayr	6	7^{12}

Qualifying competition
WC	(Argentina) Guido Pella	3	1
7	(Germany) Denis Gremelmayr	6	6

==== Second qualifier ====
First round
2	(France) Olivier Patience	3	6	6^{7}
(Argentina) Diego Junqueira	6	4	7^{9}
(Argentina) Cristian Villagrán	6	4	3
5	(Spain) Gorka Fraile	2	6	6

Qualifying competition
(Argentina) Diego Junqueira	6	7
5	(Spain) Gorka Fraile	3	5

==== Third qualifier ====
First round
3	(Italy) Stefano Galvani	6	6
(Argentina) Edgardo Massa	4	0
(Argentina) Juan Pablo Brzezicki	7^{7}	6
8	(Italy) Paolo Lorenzi	6^{2}	0

Qualifying competition
3	(Italy) Stefano Galvani	3	6^{5}
(Argentina) Juan Pablo Brzezicki	6	7^{7}

==== Fourth qualifier ====
First round
4	(Argentina) Carlos Berlocq	6	6
WC	(Argentina) Horacio Zeballos	3	3
WC	(Argentina) Eduardo Schwank	6	6
6	(Serbia) Boris Pašanski	4	2

Qualifying competition
4	(Argentina) Carlos Berlocq	6	6
WC	(Argentina) Eduardo Schwank	3	4
