= Vinko Dvořák =

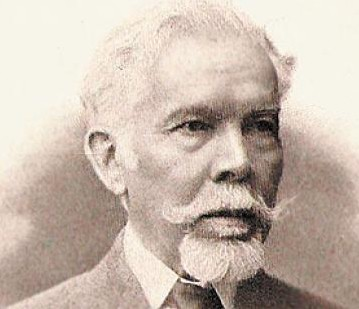
- Born: 21 January 1848; Dušejov, Austrian Empire
- Died: 6 May 1922 (aged 74); Zagreb, Kingdom of Serbs, Croats and Slovenes
- Education: Charles University in Prague
- Scientific career
- Fields: Acoustics, optics

Vinko Dvořák (January 21, 1848 – May 6, 1922) was a Czech-Croatian physicist, professor and academician.

He studied mathematics and physics at the Charles University in Prague, and after graduating he became an assistant to professor Ernst Mach. After obtaining his doctorate in Prague in 1873/1874 he came to Zagreb (at the time also part of Austria-Hungary) and founded the Physics Cabinet at the Faculty of Philosophy in 1875.

Dvořák made many important discoveries in the field of experimental acoustics and optics, which are known as the Dvořák-Rayleigh current, the Dvořák acoustic repulsion, and the Dvořák circuit. His work on acoustic radiometers coincided with that of Lord Rayleigh.

He was the dean of the Faculty of Philosophy in 1881/82 and again in 1891/92 and the rector of the University of Zagreb in 1893/94.

Professor Dvorak made constant advancements in physics experimentation at the Faculty—in 1896 he obtained a Röntgen radiation device just six months after it was discovered.

He became a member of the Academy of Sciences and Arts in 1883 (associate) and 1887 (full member). He was also an associate member of the Czech Academy of Franz Joseph I, a member of the Société francaise de physique (French Physics Society) and the Paris Société internationale des électriciens, and a member of the Royal Czech Society of Sciences in Prague.

Dvořák retired in 1911.

Academic offices
| Preceded by Josip Pliverić | Rector of the University of Zagreb; 1893 – 1894 | Succeeded by Antun Maurović |
