= 2005 ATP Buenos Aires – Singles =

Singles
- 2005 ATP Buenos Aires

Final
- Champion: (Argentina) Gastón Gaudio
- Runner-up: (Argentina) Mariano Puerta
- Score: 6–4, 6–4

Details
- Draw: 32
- Seeds: 8

Events
| Singles | Doubles |
| ← 2004 · | ATP Buenos Aires | · 2006 → |

Gastón Gaudio defeated Mariano Puerta 6–4, 6–4 to win the 2005 ATP Buenos Aires singles competition. Guillermo Coria was the champion but did not defend his title.

== Seeds ==
1. (Spain) Carlos Moyà (quarterfinals)
2. (Argentina) Gastón Gaudio (champion)
3. (Argentina) Guillermo Cañas (second round)
4. (Chile) ~~Fernando González~~ (withdrew)
5. (Argentina) Juan Ignacio Chela (first round)
6. (Italy) Filippo Volandri (first round)
7. (Spain) Rafael Nadal (quarterfinals)
8. (Argentina) Mariano Zabaleta (second round)

== Draw ==
=== Key ===
- Q = Qualifier
- WC = Wild card
- LL = Lucky loser
- Alt = Alternate
- ITF = ITF entry
- PR = Protected ranking
- SR = Special ranking
- SE = Special exempt
- JE = Junior exempt
- JR = Junior Accelerator Programme entrant
- CO = College Accelerator Programme entrant
- NG = Next Gen Accelerator Program entrant
- w/o = Walkover
- r = Retired
- d = Defaulted

=== Finals ===
Semifinals
WC | (Argentina) Mariano Puerta | 6 | 7^{7}
(Argentina) José Acasuso | 4 | 6^{5}
(Spain) Alberto Martín | 3 | 4
2 | (Argentina) Gastón Gaudio | 6 | 6

Final
WC | (Argentina) Mariano Puerta | 4 | 4
2 | (Argentina) Gastón Gaudio | 6 | 6

=== Top half ===
First round
1 | (Spain) C Moyà | 6 | 7^{7}
Q | (Australia) P Luczak | 3 | 6^{5}
(Spain) Á Costa | 5 | 4
(Argentina) J Mónaco | 7 | 6
Q | (Argentina) J-P Guzmán | 2 | 6^{2}
WC | (Argentina) M Puerta | 6 | 7^{7}
(Germany) L Burgsmüller | 6 | 6
6 | (Italy) F Volandri | 4 | 2
LL | (Spain) G García López | 6 | 6
(Spain) D Sánchez | 4 | 3
(Argentina) J Acasuso | 6 | 6
(France) P-H Mathieu | 3 | 2
(Spain) S Ventura | 3 | 3
(Spain) N Almagro | 6 | 6
(Spain) Á Calatrava | 3 | 2
8 | (Argentina) M Zabaleta | 6 | 6

Second round
1 | (Spain) C Moyà | 6 | 6
(Argentina) J Mónaco | 1 | 2
WC | (Argentina) M Puerta | 6 | 6
(Germany) L Burgsmüller | 2 | 0
LL | (Spain) G García López | 4 | 3
(Argentina) J Acasuso | 6 | 6
(Spain) N Almagro | 6^{4} | 6 | 6
8 | (Argentina) M Zabaleta | 7^{7} | 4 | 4

Quarterfinals
1 | (Spain) C Moyà | 6^{0} | 3
WC | (Argentina) M Puerta | 7^{7} | 6
(Argentina) J Acasuso | 6 | 6
(Spain) N Almagro | 3 | 4

Semifinals
WC | (Argentina) M Puerta | 6 | 7^{7}
(Argentina) J Acasuso | 4 | 6^{5}

=== Bottom half ===
First round
5 | (Argentina) J I Chela | 5 | 1
Q | (Spain) M López | 7 | 6
(Spain) F Mantilla | 6 | 7^{7}
(Spain) Ó Hernández | 4 | 6^{0}
(Spain) D Ferrer | 0^{r}
(Spain) A Martín | 5
(Spain) À Corretja | 3 | 1
3 | (Argentina) G Cañas | 6 | 6
WC/7 | (Spain) R Nadal | 7^{7} | 6
(Argentina) A Calleri | 6^{2} | 3
WC | (Argentina) E Massa | 6^{5} | 0
(Italy) P Starace | 7^{7} | 6
(Spain) Montañés | 3 | 6 | 2
(Brazil) F Saretta | 6 | 0 | 6
Q | (Italy) F Luzzi | 6 | 1 | 3
2 | (Argentina) G Gaudio | 2 | 6 | 6

Second round
Q | (Spain) M López | 6 | 6^{5} | 6^{4}
(Spain) F Mantilla | 4 | 7^{7} | 7^{7}
(Spain) A Martín | 6 | 6
3 | (Argentina) G Cañas | 4 | 3
WC/7 | (Spain) R Nadal | 6 | 6
(Italy) P Starace | 1 | 3
(Brazil) F Saretta | 3 | 2
2 | (Argentina) G Gaudio | 6 | 6

Quarterfinals
(Spain) F Mantilla | 7 | 4 | 6^{3}
(Spain) A Martín | 5 | 6 | 7^{7}
WC/7 | (Spain) R Nadal | 6 | 0 | 1
2 | (Argentina) G Gaudio | 0 | 6 | 6

Semifinals
(Spain) A Martín | 3 | 4
2 | (Argentina) G Gaudio | 6 | 6
