= Christopher Kas =

German tennis player (born 1980)

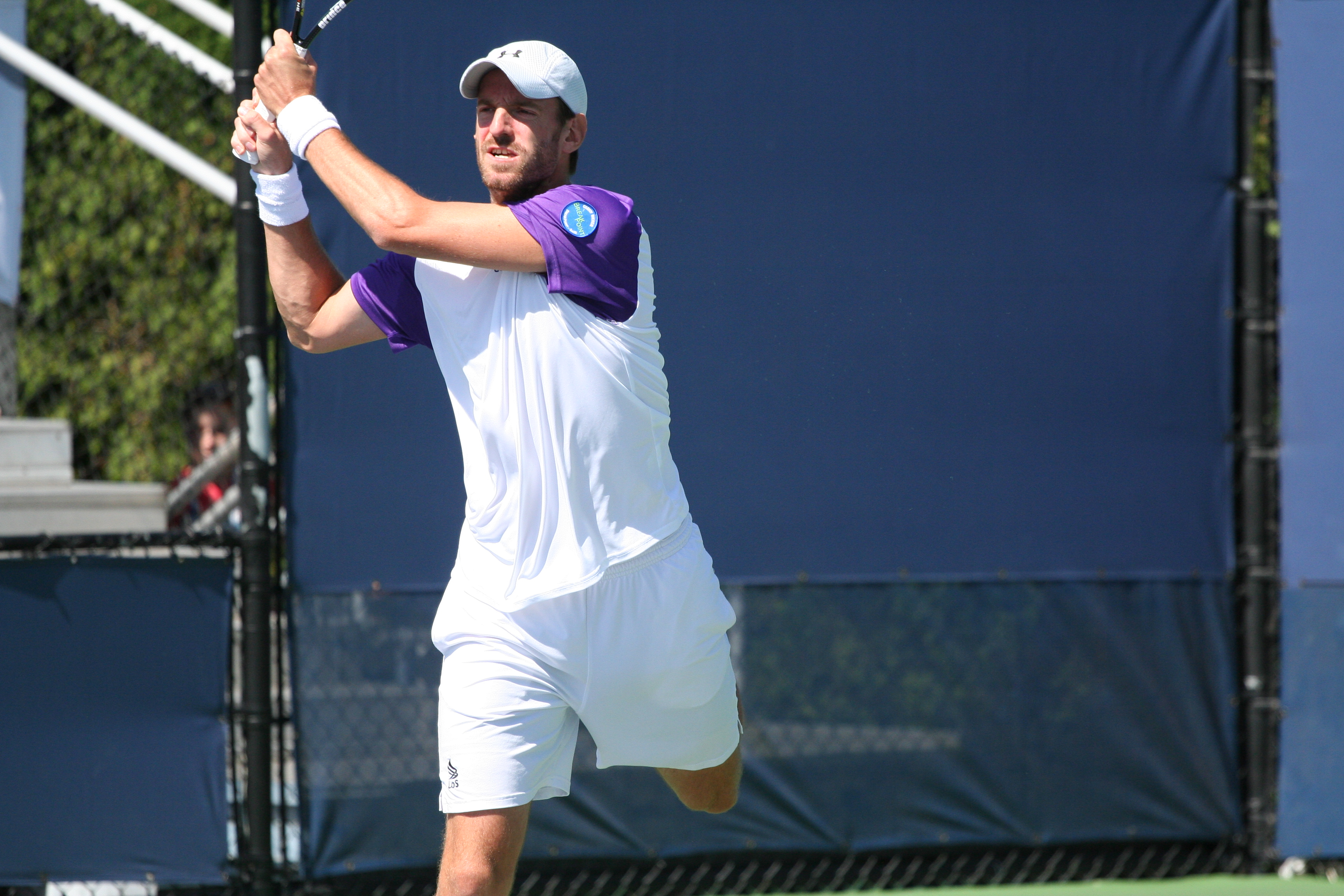
- Country (sports): Germany
- Residence: Trostberg, Germany
- Born: 13 June 1980 (age 44); Trostberg, West Germany
- Height: 1.87 m (6 ft 2 in)
- Turned pro: 2001
- Retired: 2014
- Plays: Right-handed (two-handed backhand)
- Prize money: US$1,350,322

Singles
- Career record: 0–2
- Career titles: 0; 0 Challenger, 1 Futures
- Highest ranking: No. 224 (4 November 2002)

Grand Slam singles results
- Australian Open: Q1 (2003)
- Wimbledon: Q1 (2003)

Doubles
- Career record: 191–202
- Career titles: 5; 22 Challenger, 6 Futures
- Highest ranking: No. 17 (6 February 2012)

Grand Slam doubles results
- Australian Open: QF (2012)
- French Open: 3R (2009, 2011, 2013)
- Wimbledon: SF (2011)
- US Open: QF (2008)

Grand Slam mixed doubles results
- Australian Open: 2R (2009, 2010)
- French Open: SF (2010)
- Wimbledon: 3R (2009)
- US Open: 1R (2008, 2009, 2011)

Other mixed doubles tournaments
- Olympic Games: SF – 4th (2012)
- Last updated on: 29 August 2021.

Christopher Kas (born 13 June 1980) is a retired German tennis player.

Kas has a career-high ATP singles ranking of world No. 224, which he achieved in November 2002. He also has a career-high doubles ranking of world No. 17, achieved in February 2012.

Kas reached 20 double finals on the ATP Tour posting a record of 5 wins and 15 losses with an array of partners.

At the 2012 Summer Olympics, he finished in fourth place in mixed doubles alongside Sabine Lisicki. In January 2015, Sabine appointed him to her coaching team.

In 2022, Kas coaches German tennis player Jule Niemeier. Together they reached the quarterfinals at Wimbledon. He is currently coaching Kateryna Baindl.

== Olympic medal matches ==
=== Mixed doubles: 1 bronze medal match (0–1) ===
| Result | Year | Location | Surface | Partner | Opponents | Score |
|---|---|---|---|---|---|---|
| 4th place | 2012 | London Olympics | Grass | (Germany) Sabine Lisicki | (United States) Lisa Raymond (United States) Mike Bryan | 3–6, 6–4, [4–10] |

== ATP career finals ==
=== Doubles: 20 (5 titles, 15 runner-ups) ===
| Legend Grand Slam tournaments (0–0) ATP World Tour Finals (0–0) ATP World Tour Masters 1000 (0–0) ATP World Tour 500 Series (1–2) ATP World Tour 250 Series (4–13) | Titles by surface Hard (2–7) Clay (2–8) Grass (1–0) Carpet (0–0) | Titles by setting Outdoor (5–11) Indoor (0–4) |

| Result | W–L | Date | Tournament | Tier | Surface | Partner | Opponents | Score |
|---|---|---|---|---|---|---|---|---|
| Loss | 0–1 | Jul 2006 | Båstad, Sweden | 250 Series | Clay | (Austria) Oliver Marach | (Sweden) Jonas Björkman (Sweden) Thomas Johansson | 3–6, 6–4, [4–10] |
| Loss | 0–2 | Jul 2006 | Amersfoort, Netherlands | 250 Series | Clay | (Argentina) Lucas Arnold Ker | (Spain) Alberto Martín (Spain) Fernando Vicente | 4–6, 3–6 |
| Loss | 0–3 | Jul 2007 | Kitzbühel, Austria | 500 Series | Clay | (Germany) Tomas Behrend | (Italy) Potito Starace (Peru) Luis Horna | 6–7^{(4–7)}, 6–7^{(5–7)} |
| Loss | 0–4 | Oct 2007 | Vienna, Austria | 500 Series | Hard | (Germany) Tomas Behrend | (Poland) Mariusz Fyrstenberg (Poland) Marcin Matkowski | 4–6, 2–6 |
| Loss | 0–5 | Mar 2008 | Zagreb, Croatia | 250 Series | Hard | (Netherlands) Rogier Wassen | (Australia) Paul Hanley (Australia) Jordan Kerr | 3–6, 6–3, [8–10] |
| Win | 1–5 | Jul 2008 | Stuttgart, Germany | 500 Series | Clay | (Germany) Philipp Kohlschreiber | (United Kingdom) Michael Berrer (Germany) Mischa Zverev | 6–3, 6–4 |
| Loss | 1–6 | Oct 2008 | Basel, Switzerland | 250 Series | Hard | (Germany) Philipp Kohlschreiber | (India) Mahesh Bhupathi (The Bahamas) Mark Knowles | 3–6, 3–6 |
| Loss | 1–7 | Feb 2009 | Zagreb, Croatia | 250 Series | Hard | (Netherlands) Rogier Wassen | (Czech Republic) Martin Damm (Sweden) Robert Lindstedt | 4–6, 3–6 |
| Win | 2–7 | Jun 2009 | Halle, Germany | 250 Series | Grass | (Germany) Philipp Kohlschreiber | (Germany) Andreas Beck (Switzerland) Marco Chiudinelli | 6–3, 6–4 |
| Loss | 2–8 | Jul 2010 | Stuttgart, Germany | 250 Series | Clay | (Germany) Philipp Kohlschreiber | (Argentina) Carlos Berlocq (Sweden) Eduardo Schwank | 6–7^{(5–7)}, 6–7^{(6–8)} |
| Win | 3–8 | Oct 2010 | Bangkok, Thailand | 250 Series | Hard | (Slovakia) Viktor Troicki | (Israel) Jonathan Erlich (Austria) Jürgen Melzer | 6–4, 6–4 |
| Loss | 3–9 | Feb 2011 | Delray Beach, United States | 250 Series | Hard | (Austria) Alexander Peya | (United States) Scott Lipsky (United States) Rajeev Ram | 6–4, 4–6, [3–10] |
| Loss | 3–10 | May 2011 | München, Germany | 250 Series | Clay | (Germany) Andreas Beck | (Italy) Simone Bolelli (Argentina) Horacio Zeballos | 6–7^{(3–7)}, 4–6 |
| Loss | 3–11 | Jul 2011 | Gstaad, Switzerland | 250 Series | Clay | (Austria) Alexander Peya | (Czech Republic) František Čermák (Slovakia) Filip Polášek | 3–6, 6–7^{(7–9)} |
| Loss | 3–12 | Aug 2011 | Winston-Salem, United States | 250 Series | Hard | (Austria) Alexander Peya | (Israel) Jonathan Erlich (Israel) Andy Ram | 6–7^{(2–7)}, 4–6 |
| Loss | 3–13 | Jan 2012 | Doha, Qatar | 250 Series | Hard | (Germany) Philipp Kohlschreiber | (Slovakia) Filip Polášek (Czech Republic) Lukáš Rosol | 3–6, 4–6 |
| Win | 4–13 | Jan 2013 | Doha, Qatar | 250 Series | Hard | (Germany) Philipp Kohlschreiber | (Austria) Julian Knowle (Slovakia) Filip Polášek | 7–5, 6–4 |
| Loss | 4–14 | Apr 2013 | Casablanca, Morocco | 250 Series | Clay | (Germany) Dustin Brown | (Austria) Julian Knowle (Slovakia) Filip Polášek | 3–6, 2–6 |
| Win | 5–14 | Aug 2013 | Kitzbühel, Austria | 250 Series | Clay | (Germany) Martin Emmrich | (Czech Republic) František Čermák (Czech Republic) Lukáš Dlouhý | 6–4, 6–3 |
| Loss | 5–15 | May 2014 | Düsseldorf, Germany | 250 Series | Clay | (Germany) Martin Emmrich | (Mexico) Santiago González (United States) Scott Lipsky | 5–7, 6–4, [3–10] |

== ATP Challenger and ITF Futures finals ==
=== Singles: 2 (1–1) ===
| Legend ATP Challenger (0–0) ITF Futures (1–1) | Finals by surface Hard (0–0) Clay (1–1) Grass (0–0) Carpet (0–0) |

| Result | W–L | Date | Tournament | Tier | Surface | Opponent | Score |
|---|---|---|---|---|---|---|---|
| Win | 1–0 | Sep 2000 | Czech Republic F1, Znojmo | Futures | Clay | (Slovakia) Martin Hromec | 6–1, 3–6, 6–2 |
| Loss | 1–1 | Nov 2001 | Jamaica F2, Negril | Futures | Clay | (Austria) Zbynek Mlynarik | 7–5, 6–7^{(4–7)}, ret. |

=== Doubles: 38 (28–10) ===
| Legend ATP Challenger (22–8) ITF Futures (6–2) | Finals by surface Hard (7–3) Clay (17–6) Grass (0–0) Carpet (4–1) |

| Result | W–L | Date | Tournament | Tier | Surface | Partner | Opponents | Score |
|---|---|---|---|---|---|---|---|---|
| Win | 1–0 | Aug 2000 | Luxembourg F1, Luxembourg | Futures | Clay | (Belgium) Dick Norman | (South Africa) Willem-Petrus Meyer (South Africa) Rik de Voest | 6–1, 7–6^{(7–2)} |
| Loss | 1–1 | Sep 2000 | Czech Republic F1, Znojmo | Futures | Clay | (Austria) Ronald Dueller | (Czech Republic) Igor Brukner (Slovakia) Martin Hromec | 6–3, 1–6, 4–6 |
| Win | 2–1 | May 2002 | Italy F1, Valdengo | Futures | Clay | (Japan) Jun Kato | (Italy) Riccardo Capannelli (Italy) Gianluca Luddi | 6–3, 6–4 |
| Win | 3–1 | Sep 2002 | Brașov, Romania | Challenger | Clay | (Austria) Herbert Wiltschnig | (Spain) Rubén Ramírez Hidalgo (Spain) Santiago Ventura | 5–7, 6–4, 7–5 |
| Win | 4–1 | Sep 2002 | Sofia, Bulgaria | Challenger | Clay | (Austria) Oliver Marach | (Bulgaria) Ilia Kushev (Austria) Luben Pampoulov | 7–6^{(7–4)}, 6–7^{(7–9)}, 6–2 |
| Win | 5–1 | Feb 2003 | Portugal F1, Espinho | Futures | Clay | (Luxembourg) Mike Scheidweiler | (Slovakia) Michal Mertiňák (Austria) Marco Mirnegg | 6–3, 6–2 |
| Win | 6–1 | Mar 2004 | Portugal F1, Faro | Futures | Hard | (Germany) Philipp Petzschner | (Slovakia) Boris Borgula (Slovakia) Roman Kukal | 3–6, 6–1, 6–4 |
| Win | 7–1 | May 2004 | Italy F6, Valdengo | Futures | Clay | (Germany) Philipp Petzschner | (Italy) Giuseppe Menga (Italy) Massimo Ocera | 6–3, 6–1 |
| Win | 8–1 | Jun 2004 | Italy F13, Cesena | Futures | Clay | (Italy) Federico Torresi | (Argentina) Diego Junqueira (Chile) Felipe Parada | 3–6, 6–1, 6–2 |
| Win | 9–1 | Aug 2004 | Mönchengladbach, Germany | Challenger | Clay | (Germany) Philipp Petzschner | (Germany) Karsten Braasch (Germany) Franz Stauder | 3–6, 6–2, 7–6^{(7–4)} |
| Win | 10–1 | Nov 2004 | Eckental, Germany | Challenger | Carpet | (Germany) Philipp Petzschner | (Italy) Daniele Bracciali (Czech Republic) Petr Luxa | 6–4, 7–6^{(7–4)} |
| Win | 11–1 | Dec 2004 | Ischgl, Austria | Challenger | Carpet | (Italy) Leonardo Azzaro | (Italy) Gianluca Bazzica (Italy) Massimo Dell'Acqua | 7–5, 6–3 |
| Win | 12–1 | May 2005 | Dresden, Germany | Challenger | Clay | (Germany) Philipp Petzschner | (Netherlands) Bart Beks (Netherlands) Martijn van Haasteren | 6–7^{(2–7)}, 6–2, 6–4 |
| Loss | 12–2 | Jul 2005 | Oberstaufen, Germany | Challenger | Clay | (Austria) Werner Eschauer | (Austria) Oliver Marach (Switzerland) Jean-Claude Scherrer | 5–7, 3–6 |
| Loss | 12–3 | Jul 2005 | Rimini, Italy | Challenger | Clay | (Germany) Philipp Petzschner | (Czech Republic) David Škoch (Czech Republic) Martin Štěpánek | 3–6, 7–6^{(7–1)}, 1–6 |
| Win | 13–3 | Oct 2005 | Mons, Belgium | Challenger | Hard | (Germany) Philipp Petzschner | (Czech Republic) Tomáš Cibulec (Belgium) Tom Vanhoudt | 7–6^{(7–4)}, 6–2 |
| Win | 14–3 | Nov 2005 | Eckental, Germany | Challenger | Carpet | (Germany) Philipp Petzschner | (Germany) Torsten Popp (Netherlands) Jasper Smit | 6–3, 7–5 |
| Loss | 14–4 | Nov 2005 | Helsinki, Finland | Challenger | Hard | (Germany) Philipp Petzschner | (Switzerland) Yves Allegro (Germany) Michael Kohlmann | 6–4, 1–6, 4–6 |
| Loss | 14–5 | Nov 2005 | Sunderland, United Kingdom | Challenger | Hard | (Germany) Philipp Petzschner | (Germany) Sebastian Rieschick (Germany) Frank Moser | 4–6, 7–6^{(7–3)}, 4–6 |
| Loss | 14–6 | Jan 2006 | Austria F1, Bergheim | Futures | Carpet | (Austria) Philipp Petzschner | (Sweden) Johan Brunström (United States) Philip Stolt | 3–6, 4–6 |
| Win | 15–6 | Jan 2006 | Heilbronn, Germany | Challenger | Carpet | (Germany) Philipp Petzschner | (Czech Republic) David Škoch (Czech Republic) Lukáš Dlouhý | 6–7^{(2–7)}, 6–3, [10–4] |
| Loss | 15–7 | Feb 2006 | Bergamo, Italy | Challenger | Hard | (Germany) Philipp Petzschner | (Italy) Daniele Bracciali (Italy) Giorgio Galimberti | 5–7, 6–0, [11–13] |
| Win | 16–7 | Feb 2006 | Besançon, France | Challenger | Hard | (Germany) Philipp Petzschner | (Switzerland) Jean-Claude Scherrer (Croatia) Lovro Zovko | 6–2, 6–2 |
| Loss | 16–8 | Apr 2006 | Monza, Italy | Challenger | Clay | (Italy) Leonardo Azzaro | (Spain) Rubén Ramírez Hidalgo (Italy) Tomas Tenconi | 6–4, 4–6, [11–13] |
| Loss | 16–9 | May 2006 | Dresden, Germany | Challenger | Clay | (Germany) Philipp Petzschner | (Slovakia) Michal Mertiňák (Switzerland) Yves Allegro | 3–6, 0–6 |
| Win | 17–9 | Jun 2006 | Braunschweig, Germany | Challenger | Clay | (Germany) Tomas Behrend | (Argentina) Máximo González (Argentina) Sergio Roitman | 7–6^{(7–5)}, 6–4 |
| Win | 18–9 | Sep 2006 | Szczecin, Poland | Challenger | Clay | (Germany) Tomas Behrend | (Poland) Tomasz Bednarek (Poland) Marcin Matkowski | 6–1, 3–6, [10–4] |
| Win | 19–9 | Feb 2007 | Besançon, France | Challenger | Hard | (Austria) Alexander Peya | (France) Grégory Carraz (Luxembourg) Gilles Müller | 6–4, 6–4 |
| Win | 20–9 | May 2007 | Dresden, Germany | Challenger | Clay | (Germany) Tomas Behrend | (France) Jean-Baptiste Perlant (France) Xavier Pujo | 6–3, 6–4 |
| Win | 21–9 | Jun 2007 | Braunschweig, Germany | Challenger | Clay | (Germany) Tomas Behrend | (Spain) Óscar Hernández (Spain) Carles Poch Gradin | 6–0, 6–2 |
| Win | 22–9 | Sep 2007 | Szczecin, Poland | Challenger | Clay | (Germany) Tomas Behrend | (Argentina) Juan Pablo Brzezicki (Argentina) Juan Pablo Guzmán | 6–0, 5–7, [10–8] |
| Win | 23–9 | Sep 2007 | Napoli, Italy | Challenger | Clay | (Germany) Tomas Behrend | (Italy) Leonardo Azzaro (Italy) Alessandro Motti | 7–6^{(7–5)}, 6–2 |
| Win | 24–9 | Nov 2007 | Dnipropetrovsk, Ukraine | Challenger | Hard | (Croatia) Lovro Zovko | (India) Rohan Bopanna (South Africa) Chris Haggard | 7–6^{(7–5)}, 6–2 |
| Win | 25–9 | Apr 2009 | Rome, Italy | Challenger | Clay | (Germany) Simon Greul | (Sweden) Johan Brunström (Netherlands Antilles) Jean-Julien Rojer | 4–6, 7–6^{(7–2)}, [10–2] |
| Loss | 25–10 | May 2011 | Prague, Czech Republic | Challenger | Clay | (Austria) Alexander Peya | (Czech Republic) František Čermák (Czech Republic) Lukáš Rosol | 3–6, 4–6 |
| Win | 26–10 | Sep 2012 | Pétange, Luxembourg | Challenger | Hard | (Belgium) Dick Norman | (United Kingdom) Jamie Murray (Brazil) André Sá | 2–6, 6–2, [10–8] |
| Win | 27–10 | May 2013 | Bordeaux, France | Challenger | Clay | (Austria) Oliver Marach | (United States) Nicholas Monroe (Germany) Simon Stadler | 2–6, 6–4, [10–1] |
| Win | 28–10 | Nov 2013 | Ortisei, Italy | Challenger | Hard | (Germany) Tim Pütz | (Italy) Daniele Bracciali (Germany) Benjamin Becker | 6–2, 7–5 |

== Performance timelines ==
Key
| W | F | SF | QF | #R | RR | Q# | DNQ | A | NH |

(W) winner; (F) finalist; (SF) semifinalist; (QF) quarterfinalist; (#R) rounds 4, 3, 2, 1; (RR) round-robin stage; (Q#) qualification round; (DNQ) did not qualify; (A) absent; (NH) not held; (SR) strike rate (events won / competed); (W–L) win–loss record.
To avoid confusion and double counting, these charts are updated at the conclusion of a tournament or when the player's participation has ended.

=== Doubles ===
| Tournament | 2006 | 2007 | 2008 | 2009 | 2010 | 2011 | 2012 | 2013 | 2014 | SR | W–L | Win% |
|---|---|---|---|---|---|---|---|---|---|---|---|---|
Grand Slam tournaments
| Australian Open | A | 1R | 3R | 2R | 1R | 1R | QF | 1R | 2R | 0 / 8 | 7–8 | 47% |
| French Open | 1R | 1R | 2R | 3R | 1R | 3R | 2R | 3R | 1R | 0 / 9 | 8–9 | 47% |
| Wimbledon | 1R | 3R | 3R | 3R | 1R | SF | 2R | A | 1R | 0 / 8 | 11–8 | 58% |
| US Open | 2R | 1R | QF | 1R | 3R | 1R | 1R | 2R | A | 0 / 8 | 7–8 | 47% |
| Win–loss | 1–3 | 2–4 | 8–4 | 5–4 | 2–4 | 6–4 | 5–4 | 3–3 | 1–3 | 0 / 33 | 33–33 | 50% |
ATP Tour Masters 1000
| Indian Wells | A | A | 1R | A | 1R | A | 1R | A | A | 0 / 3 | 0–3 | 0% |
| Miami | A | A | 2R | 1R | 1R | A | A | 1R | A | 0 / 4 | 1–4 | 20% |
| Monte Carlo | A | A | A | A | 1R | A | 1R | A | A | 0 / 2 | 0–2 | 0% |
| Hamburg | A | 2R | 1R | Not Masters Series | | | | | | 0 / 2 | 1–2 | 33% |
| Madrid | A | A | 1R | 1R | A | A | 2R | A | A | 0 / 3 | 1–3 | 25% |
| Rome | A | A | A | A | A | A | 2R | A | A | 0 / 1 | 1–1 | 50% |
| Shanghai | A | A | A | A | A | 2R | A | A | A | 0 / 1 | 1–1 | 50% |
| Paris Masters | A | A | A | QF | 1R | SF | 2R | A | A | 0 / 4 | 6–4 | 60% |
| Win–loss | 0–0 | 1–1 | 1–4 | 2–3 | 0–4 | 4–2 | 3–5 | 0–1 | 0–0 | 0 / 20 | 11–20 | 35% |

=== Mixed doubles ===
| Tournament | 2007 | 2008 | 2009 | 2010 | 2011 | 2012 | SR | W–L | Win % |
|---|---|---|---|---|---|---|---|---|---|
Grand Slam tournaments
| Australian Open | A | A | 2R | 2R | A | 1R | 0 / 3 | 2–3 | 40% |
| French Open | A | A | 1R | SF | A | 1R | 0 / 3 | 3–3 | 50% |
| Wimbledon | 1R | A | 3R | 1R | 1R | A | 0 / 4 | 1–4 | 20% |
| US Open | A | 1R | 1R | A | 1R | A | 0 / 3 | 0–3 | 0% |
| Win–loss | 0–1 | 0–1 | 2–4 | 4–3 | 0–2 | 0–2 | 0 / 13 | 6–13 | 32% |
