= 2005 ATP Buenos Aires – Doubles =

Doubles
- 2005 ATP Buenos Aires

Final
- Champions: (Czech Republic) František Čermák (Czech Republic) Leoš Friedl
- Runners-up: (Argentina) José Acasuso (Argentina) Sebastián Prieto
- Score: 6–2, 7–5

Events
Singles	Doubles
← 2004 ·	ATP Buenos Aires	· 2006 →

Lucas Arnold and Mariano Hood were the defending champions, but lost in the semifinals this year.

František Čermák and Leoš Friedl won the title, defeating José Acasuso and Sebastián Prieto 6–2, 7–5 in the final.

== Seeds ==
1. (Argentina) Gastón Etlis / (Argentina) Martín Rodríguez (first round)
2. (Argentina) Lucas Arnold / (Argentina) Mariano Hood (semifinals)
3. (Czech Republic) František Čermák / (Czech Republic) Leoš Friedl (champions)
4. (Poland) Mariusz Fyrstenberg / (Poland) Marcin Matkowski (quarterfinals)

== Draw ==
=== Key ===
- Q = Qualifier
- WC = Wild card
- LL = Lucky loser
- Alt = Alternate
- ITF = ITF entry
- PR = Protected ranking
- SR = Special ranking
- SE = Special exempt
- JE = Junior exempt
- JR = Junior Accelerator Programme entrant
- CO = College Accelerator Programme entrant
- NG = Next Gen Accelerator Program entrant
- w/o = Walkover
- r = Retired
- d = Defaulted

=== Draw ===
First round
1	(Argentina) G Etlis (Argentina) M Rodríguez	6	2	3
WC	(Argentina) JP Brzezicki (Argentina) C Villagrán	2	6	6
(Italy) E Artoni (Argentina) I González King	6	5	6
(Italy) G Galimberti (Italy) F Volandri	2	7	2
4	(Poland) M Fyrstenberg (Poland) M Matkowski	7	6
(Argentina) JI Chela (Argentina) J Mónaco	5	4
(Argentina) J Acasuso (Argentina) S Prieto	6	6
(Spain) Ó Hernández (Italy) P Starace	0	1
(Spain) A Martín (Spain) R Nadal	2	6	6
WC	(Spain) À Corretja (Argentina) J-P Guzmán	6	3	4
Alt	(Spain) Á Calatrava (Spain) D Sánchez	6^{5}	1
3	(Czech Republic) F Čermák (Czech Republic) L Friedl	7^{7}	6
(Argentina) G Cañas (Argentina) M García	6	7
(Germany) K Braasch (Czech Republic) T Cibulec	3	5
(Czech Republic) O Fukárek (Netherlands) R Wassen	6	1	2
2	(Argentina) L Arnold (Argentina) M Hood	3	6	6

Quarterfinals
WC	(Argentina) JP Brzezicki (Argentina) C Villagrán	7^{7}	2	6
(Italy) E Artoni (Argentina) I González King	6^{3}	6	3
4	(Poland) M Fyrstenberg (Poland) M Matkowski	2	3
(Argentina) J Acasuso (Argentina) S Prieto	6	6
(Spain) A Martín (Spain) R Nadal	6	3	0
3	(Czech Republic) F Čermák (Czech Republic) L Friedl	3	6	6
(Argentina) G Cañas (Argentina) M García	0	2
2	(Argentina) L Arnold (Argentina) M Hood	6	6

Semifinals
WC	(Argentina) JP Brzezicki (Argentina) C Villagrán	6^{8}	4
(Argentina) J Acasuso (Argentina) S Prieto	7^{10}	6
3	(Czech Republic) F Čermák (Czech Republic) L Friedl	6	6^{1}	6
2	(Argentina) L Arnold (Argentina) M Hood	1	7^{7}	1

Final
(Argentina) J Acasuso (Argentina) S Prieto	2	5
3	(Czech Republic) F Čermák (Czech Republic) L Friedl	6	7
