= Ostdeutscher Sparkassen Cup =

Defunct tennis tournament
- Founded: 2005
- Abolished: 2008
- Editions: 4
- Location: Dresden, Germany
- Venue: TC Blau-Weiß Dresden-Blasewitz
- Category: ATP Challenger Series
- Surface: Clay / Outdoors
- Draw: 32S/32Q/16D

The Ostdeutscher Sparkassen Cup was a tennis tournament held in Dresden, Germany from 2005 to 2008. The event was part of the ATP Challenger Series and was played on outdoor clay courts.

== Past finals ==
=== Singles ===
| Year | Champion | Runner-up | Score |
|---|---|---|---|
| 2005 | (Greece) Vasilis Mazarakis | (Serbia and Montenegro) Boris Pašanski | 6-3, 6-2 |
| 2006 | (Germany) Simon Greul | (Serbia and Montenegro) Janko Tipsarević | 7-6, 6-2 |
| 2007 | (Russia) Yuri Schukin | (Germany) Florian Mayer | 7-6, 7-6 |
| 2008 | (Germany) Andreas Beck | (South Korea) Woong-Sun Jun | 2-6, 6-3, 7-5 |

=== Doubles ===
| Year | Champion | Runner-up | Score |
|---|---|---|---|
| 2005 | (Germany) Christopher Kas (Germany) Philipp Petzschner | (Netherlands) Bart Beks (Netherlands) Martijn van Haasteren | 6-7, 6-2, 6-4 |
| 2006 | (Switzerland) Yves Allegro (Slovakia) Michal Mertiňák | (Germany) Christopher Kas (Germany) Philipp Petzschner | 6-3, 6-0 |
| 2007 | (Germany) Tomas Behrend (Germany) Christopher Kas | (France) Jean-Baptiste Perlant (France) Xavier Pujo | 6-3, 6-4 |
| 2008 | (Germany) Daniel Brands (South Korea) Woong-Sun Jun | (Serbia) Ilia Bozoljac (Serbia) Dušan Vemić | 2-6, 7-6, [10-6] |
