= 2006 Copa Telmax – Doubles =

Tennis champions defend title against strong opponents

Doubles
- 2006 Copa Telmax

Final
- Champions: (Czech Republic) František Čermák (Czech Republic) Leoš Friedl
- Runners-up: (Greece) Vasilis Mazarakis (Serbia and Montenegro) Boris Pašanski
- Score: 6–1, 6–2

Events
Singles	Doubles
← 2005 ·	ATP Buenos Aires	· 2007 →

František Čermák and Leoš Friedl were the defending champions.

Čermák and Friedl successfully defended their title, defeating Vasilis Mazarakis and Boris Pašanski 6–1, 6–2 in the final.

== Seeds ==
1. (Czech Republic) František Čermák / (Czech Republic) Leoš Friedl (champions)
2. (Poland) Mariusz Fyrstenberg / (Poland) Marcin Matkowski (first round)
3. (Argentina) Agustín Calleri / (Argentina) Gastón Etlis (quarterfinals)
4. (Argentina) Martín García / (Argentina) Sebastián Prieto (semifinals, withdrew)

== Draw ==
=== Key ===
- Q = Qualifier
- WC = Wild card
- LL = Lucky loser
- Alt = Alternate
- SE = Special exempt
- PR = Protected ranking
- ITF = ITF entry
- JE = Junior exempt
- w/o = Walkover
- r = Retired
- d = Defaulted
- SR = Special ranking

=== Draw ===
First round
1	(Czech Republic) F Čermák (Czech Republic) L Friedl	6	6
(Czech Republic) D Škoch (Czech Republic) J Vaněk	1	2
(Spain) A Montañés (Spain) A Portas	3	0
(Argentina) C Berlocq (Italy) P Starace	6	6
3	(Argentina) M García (Argentina) S Prieto	6	6
(Spain) N Almagro (Czech Republic) T Cibulec	3	1
WC	(Argentina) JM del Potro (Argentina) J Mónaco	3	6	[7]
(Spain) A Martín (Spain) F Vicente	6	3	[10]
WC	(Argentina) E Massa (Argentina) L Mayer	2	6	[5]
(France) O Patience (France) F Serra	6	2	[10]
(Italy) A di Mauro (Italy) F Volandri	2	3
4	(Argentina) A Calleri (Argentina) G Etlis	6	6
(Brazil) M Daniel (Brazil) F Saretta	6^{2}	6	[8]
(Greece) V Mazarakis (Serbia and Montenegro) B Pašanski	7^{7}	1	[10]
(Spain) JC Ferrero (Spain) S Ventura	6	6
2	(Poland) M Fyrstenberg (Poland) M Matkowski	4	3

Quarterfinals
1	(Czech Republic) F Čermák (Czech Republic) L Friedl	6	5	[11]
(Argentina) C Berlocq (Italy) P Starace	2	7	[9]
3	(Argentina) M García (Argentina) S Prieto	5	6^{4}
(Spain) A Martín (Spain) F Vicente	7	7^{7}
(France) O Patience (France) F Serra
4	(Argentina) A Calleri (Argentina) G Etlis	w/o
(Greece) V Mazarakis (Serbia and Montenegro) B Pašanski	4	6	[12]
(Spain) JC Ferrero (Spain) S Ventura	6	4	[10]

Semifinals
1	(Czech Republic) F Čermák (Czech Republic) L Friedl	5	6	[11]
(Spain) A Martín (Spain) F Vicente	7	3	[9]
4	(Argentina) A Calleri (Argentina) G Etlis
(Greece) V Mazarakis (Serbia and Montenegro) B Pašanski	w/o

Final
1	(Czech Republic) F Čermák (Czech Republic) L Friedl	6	6
(Greece) V Mazarakis (Serbia and Montenegro) B Pašanski	1	2
