= Vasilis Mazarakis =

Greek tennis player

- Country (sports): Greece
- Born: 9 February 1980 (age 45); Athens, Greece
- Height: 1.78 m (5 ft 10 in)
- Turned pro: 1999
- Plays: Right-handed
- Coach: Dirk Hordoff
- Prize money: $256,787

Singles
- Career record: 7-10
- Career titles: 0
- Highest ranking: No. 115 (10 October 2005)

Grand Slam singles results
- Australian Open: Q2 (2000, 2004, 2005)
- French Open: Q2 (2000, 2002, 2006)
- Wimbledon: Q1 (2000, 2005)

Doubles
- Career record: 6-7
- Career titles: 0
- Highest ranking: No. 101 (18 September 2006)

Other doubles tournaments
- Olympic Games: 1R (2004)
- Last updated on: 10 February 2022.

Vasilis Mazarakis (Greek: Βασίλης Μαζαράκης; born 9 February 1980) is a former professional tennis player from Greece.

== Career ==
Mazarakis teamed up with Eleni Daniilidou to represent Greece in the 2002 Hopman Cup, but they lost the qualification play-off to Italy. He did however compete for his country at the 2004 Athens Olympics, in the men's doubles, with Konstantinos Economidis. The pair lost in the opening round to Czechs Martin Damm and Cyril Suk.

He never entered the main draw of a Grand Slam. The biggest ATP tournament that he participated in was the 2006 Pacific Life Open at Indian Wells, a Masters Series event. He failed to progress past the first round, eliminated by Andy Murray in straight sets. Also in 2006, Mazarakis and his partner Boris Pašanski were runners-up at the ATP Buenos Aires tournament.

From 2000 to 2005, Mazarakis represented Greece in 10 Davis Cup ties. He won eight of his 14 singles rubbers and three of the five doubles matches that he played in.

== ATP career finals ==
=== Doubles: 1 (1 runner-up) ===
Legend Grand Slam Tournaments (0–0) ATP World Tour Finals (0–0) ATP Masters Series (0–0) ATP Championship Series (0–0) ATP International Series (0–1)	Finals by surface Hard (0–0) Clay (0–1) Grass (0–0) Carpet (0–0)	Finals by setting Outdoors (0–1) Indoors (0–0)

Result	W–L	Date	Tournament	Tier	Surface	Partner	Opponents	Score
Loss	0–1	Feb 2006	Buenos Aires, Argentina	International Series	Clay	(Serbia and Montenegro) Boris Pašanski	(Czech Republic) František Čermák (Czech Republic) Leoš Friedl	1–6, 2–6

== ATP Challenger and ITF Futures finals ==
=== Singles: 28 (14–14) ===
Legend ATP Challenger (6–7) ITF Futures (8–7)	Finals by surface Hard (5–2) Clay (9–12) Grass (0–0) Carpet (0–0)

Result	W–L	Date	Tournament	Tier	Surface	Opponent	Score
Loss	0–1	Jun 1999	Italy F10, Pavia	Futures	Clay	(Israel) Harel Levy	4–6, 5–7
Win	1–1	Jun 1999	Italy F11, Valdengo	Futures	Clay	(Italy) Gianluca Luddi	6–1, 4–6, 7–6
Win	2–1	Sep 1999	Skopje, Macedonia	Challenger	Clay	(Hungary) Gergely Kisgyörgy	6–1, 6–0
Loss	2–2	May 2000	Algeria F2, Algiers	Futures	Clay	(Spain) Albert Montañés	1–6, 1–6
Loss	2–3	May 2000	Great Britain F5, Newcastle	Futures	Clay	(France) Olivier Mutis	5–7, 2–6
Loss	2–4	Sep 2000	Budapest, Hungary	Challenger	Clay	(Argentina) Diego Moyano	3–6, 0–6
Win	3–4	Mar 2001	New Zealand F2, Christchurch	Futures	Hard	(Sweden) Björn Rehnquist	6–0, 6–3
Win	4–4	Mar 2001	Perth, Australia	Challenger	Hard	(United Kingdom) Jamie Delgado	6–2, 6–4
Loss	4–5	Sep 2001	Brindisi, Italy	Challenger	Clay	(Italy) Federico Luzzi	6–0, 6–7^{(3–7)}, 4–6
Win	5–5	Sep 2001	Sofia, Bulgaria	Challenger	Clay	(Italy) Stefano Galvani	7–6^{(7–5)}, 6–4
Loss	5–6	Sep 2001	Kamnik, Slovenia	Challenger	Clay	(Croatia) Zeljko Krajan	2–6, 6–3, 6–7^{(7–9)}
Win	6–6	Sep 2002	Samarkand, Uzbekistan	Challenger	Clay	(Netherlands) John Van Lottum	7–6^{(7–1)}, 4–6, 6–1
Loss	6–7	Oct 2002	Bukhara, Uzbekistan	Challenger	Hard	(Netherlands) John Van Lottum	6–7^{(5–7)}, 1–6
Win	7–7	Mar 2004	Australia F1, Burnie	Futures	Hard	(Australia) Andrew Derer	6–3, 6–2
Loss	7–8	Jun 2004	Netherlands F1, Alkmaar	Futures	Clay	(Belgium) Stefan Wauters	6–3, 4–6, 2–6
Win	8–8	Jan 2005	Qatar F1, Doha	Futures	Hard	(Italy) Stefano Galvani	6–3, 4–6, 6–4
Win	9–8	Feb 2005	New Zealand F1, Hamilton	Futures	Hard	(New Zealand) Mark Nielsen	7–5, 2–6, 7–6^{(7–5)}
Win	10–8	Mar 2005	Australia F3, Beaumaris	Futures	Clay	(Netherlands) Paul Logtens	6–3, 6–3
Loss	10–9	Apr 2005	Australia F4, Frankston	Futures	Clay	(Italy) Paolo Lorenzi	4–6, 6–7^{(4–7)}
Win	11–9	May 2005	Dresden, Germany	Challenger	Clay	(Serbia and Montenegro) Boris Pašanski	6–3, 6–2
Loss	11–10	Jul 2005	Budaors, Hungary	Challenger	Clay	(Serbia and Montenegro) Boris Pašanski	3–6, 2–6
Loss	11–11	Aug 2005	Samarkand, Uzbekistan	Challenger	Clay	(Serbia and Montenegro) Boris Pašanski	3–6, 2–6
Loss	11–12	Sep 2005	Budapest, Hungary	Challenger	Clay	(Serbia and Montenegro) Boris Pašanski	6–4, 3–6, 0–6
Win	12–12	Sep 2005	Banja Luka, Bosnia & Herzegovina	Challenger	Clay	(Serbia and Montenegro) Viktor Troicki	6–2, 6–2
Win	13–12	Mar 2007	Australia F3, Sale	Futures	Clay	(Australia) Rameez Junaid	4–6, 6–2, 6–2
Loss	13–13	Mar 2007	Australia F4, Lyneham	Futures	Clay	(Australia) Alun Jones	6–3, 1–6, 3–6
Loss	13–14	Oct 2007	China F6, Beijing	Futures	Hard	(Japan) Go Soeda	3–6, 1–6
Win	14–14	Jul 2009	USA F15, Rochester	Futures	Clay	(Serbia) Filip Krajinović	6–2, 6–0

=== Doubles: 8 (4–4) ===
Legend ATP Challenger (3–3) ITF Futures (1–1)	Finals by surface Hard (0–0) Clay (4–4) Grass (0–0) Carpet (0–0)

Result	W–L	Date	Tournament	Tier	Surface	Partner	Opponents	Score
Loss	0–1	Apr 2005	Canberra, Australia	Challenger	Clay	(Austria) Werner Eschauer	(Australia) Richard Fromberg (Australia) Chris Guccione	1–6, 2–6
Win	1–1	Oct 2005	Rome, Italy	Challenger	Clay	(Greece) Konstantinos Economidis	(Italy) Flavio Cipolla (Italy) Alessandro Motti	6–4, 7–6^{(7–4)}
Win	2–1	Jun 2006	Ettlingen, Germany	Challenger	Clay	(Chile) Felipe Parada	(Germany) Lars Burgsmüller (Germany) Simon Greul	3–6, 6–1, [10–4]
Win	3–1	Jun 2006	Fürth, Germany	Challenger	Clay	(Chile) Felipe Parada	(Germany) Philipp Marx (Germany) Torsten Popp	6–3, 6–2
Loss	3–2	Jul 2006	Poznań, Poland	Challenger	Clay	(Czech Republic) Jan Mertl	(Poland) Tomasz Bednarek (Poland) Michał Przysiężny	3–6, 6–3, [8–10]
Loss	3–3	Jul 2006	Rimini, Italy	Challenger	Clay	(Romania) Gabriel Moraru	(Argentina) Juan Pablo Brzezicki (Argentina) Cristian Villagrán	2–6, 7–5, [6–10]
Win	4–3	Mar 2007	Australia F4, Lyneham	Futures	Clay	(Australia) Rameez Junaid	(Australia) Carsten Ball (Australia) Dane Fernandez	6–3, 6–4
Loss	4–4	May 2007	Poland F1, Katowice	Futures	Clay	(Australia) Rameez Junaid	(Slovakia) Kamil Čapkovič (Slovakia) Marek Semjan	5–7, 0–6

== Performance timeline ==
Key
W	F	SF	QF	#R	RR	Q#	DNQ	A	NH

(W) winner; (F) finalist; (SF) semifinalist; (QF) quarterfinalist; (#R) rounds 4, 3, 2, 1; (RR) round-robin stage; (Q#) qualification round; (DNQ) did not qualify; (A) absent; (NH) not held; (SR) strike rate (events won / competed); (W–L) win–loss record.

=== Singles ===
Tournament	2000	2001	2002	2003	2004	2005	2006	SR	W–L	Win %
Grand Slam tournaments
Australian Open	Q2	Q1	Q1	Q1	Q2	Q2	A	0 / 0	0–0	–
French Open	Q2	Q1	Q2	A	Q1	A	Q2	0 / 0	0–0	–
Wimbledon	Q1	A	A	A	A	Q1	A	0 / 0	0–0	–
US Open	A	A	A	A	A	A	A	0 / 0	0–0	–
Win–loss	0–0	0–0	0–0	0–0	0–0	0–0	0–0	0 / 0	0–0	–
ATP Masters Series
Indian Wells	A	A	A	A	A	A	1R	0 / 1	0–1	0%
Hamburg	A	A	Q1	A	A	A	A	0 / 0	0–0	–
Madrid	Not Held		A	A	A	Q1	A	0 / 0	0–0	–
Win–loss	0–0	0–0	0–0	0–0	0–0	0–0	0–1	0 / 1	0–1	0%
