= Dušejov =

- Municipality
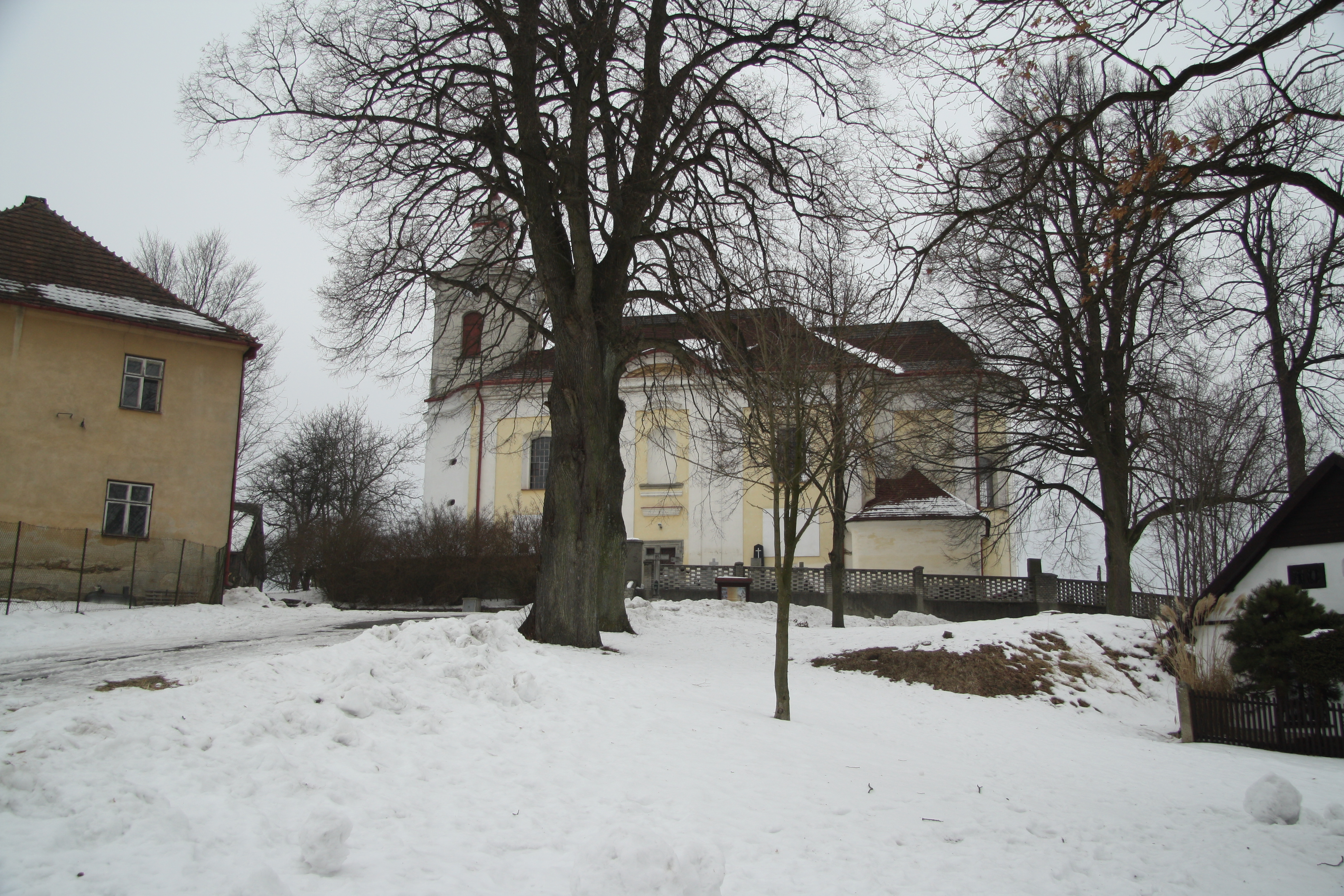
- Church of Saint Bartholomew

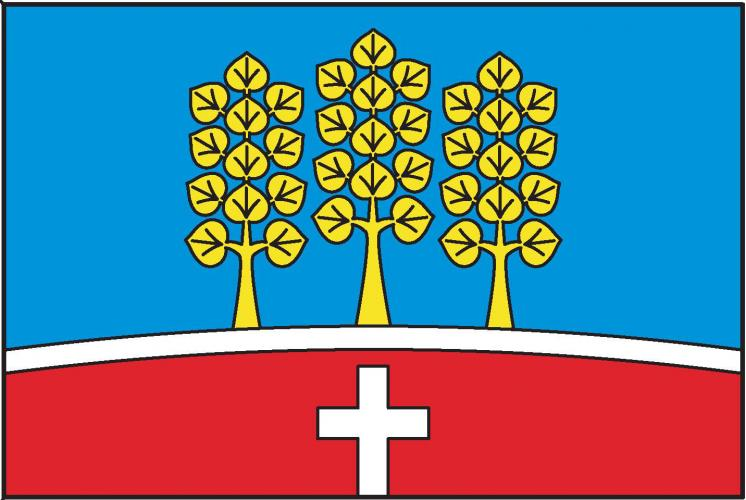
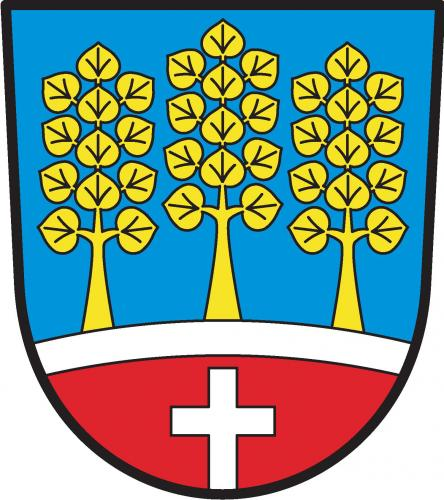
- Flag Coat of arms

- Location in the Czech Republic
- Coordinates: 49°24′32″N 15°25′58″E
- Country: Czech Republic
- Region: Vysočina
- District: Jihlava
- First mentioned: 1238

Area
  - Total: 4.87 km^{2} (1.88 sq mi)
- Elevation: 610 m (2,000 ft)

Population (2026-01-01)
  - Total: 465
  - Density: 95.5/km^{2} (247/sq mi)
- Time zone: UTC+1 (CET)
  - Summer (DST): UTC+2 (CEST)
- Postal code: 588 05
- Website: www.dusejov.cz

Dušejov (Czech pronunciation: [ˈduʃɛjof]) is a municipality and village in Jihlava District in the Vysočina Region of the Czech Republic. It has about 500 inhabitants.

Dušejov lies approximately 13 kilometres (8 mi) west of Jihlava and 104 km (65 mi) south-east of Prague.

== Demographics ==
Historical population
| Year | Pop. | ±% |
|---|---|---|
| 1869 | 366 | — |
| 1880 | 390 | +6.6% |
| 1890 | 398 | +2.1% |
| 1900 | 373 | −6.3% |
| 1910 | 405 | +8.6% |
| 1921 | 408 | +0.7% |
| 1930 | 377 | −7.6% |
| 1950 | 350 | −7.2% |
| 1961 | 341 | −2.6% |
| 1970 | 297 | −12.9% |
| 1980 | 341 | +14.8% |
| 1991 | 398 | +16.7% |
| 2001 | 438 | +10.1% |
| 2011 | 416 | −5.0% |
| 2021 | 463 | +11.3% |
Source: Censuses
