= Boris Pašanski =

Serbian tennis player and coach

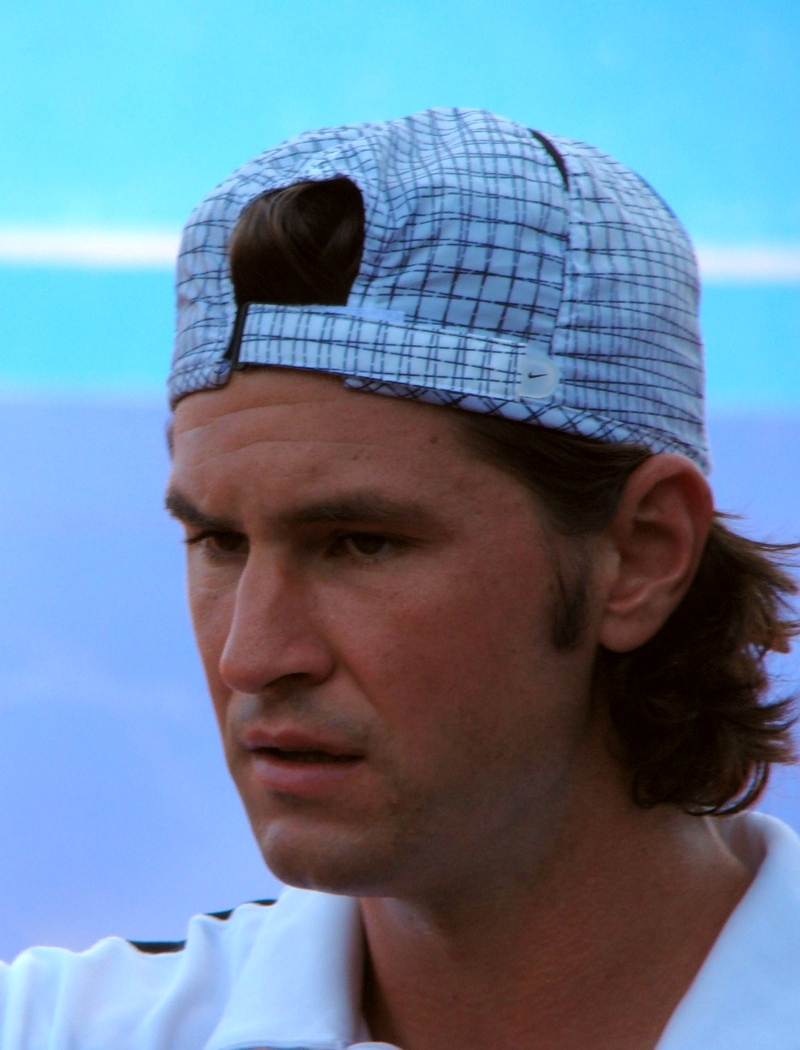
- Boris Pašanski at the Croatia Open in Umag (2008)
- Country (sports): FR Yugoslavia (2001–2003); Serbia and Montenegro (2003–2006); Serbia (2006–2014)
- Residence: Valletta, Malta
- Born: 3 November 1982 (age 43) Belgrade, SR Serbia, SFR Yugoslavia
- Height: 1.80 m (5 ft 11 in)
- Turned pro: 2001
- Retired: 2014
- Plays: Right-handed (two-handed backhand)
- Coach: Adrian Voinea, Marcos Górriz
- Prize money: $837,645

Singles
- Career record: 28–51 (35.44%)
- Career titles: 0
- Highest ranking: No. 55 (27 February 2006)

Grand Slam singles results
- Australian Open: 2R (2006)
- French Open: 1R (2006, 2007, 2008)
- Wimbledon: 1R (2006, 2008)
- US Open: 1R (2006)

Doubles
- Career record: 4–18 (18.18%)
- Career titles: 0
- Highest ranking: No. 190 (17 August 2009)

Grand Slam doubles results
- French Open: 1R (2006)

Team competitions
- Davis Cup: 4–3
Medal record
Representing Malta
Games of the Small States of Europe
Silver medal – second place	2005 Andorra	Singles

Boris Pašanski (Serbian Cyrillic: Бopиc Пaшaнcки), often spelled Pashanski in English-language media, is a former ATP professional player and a Serbian tennis coach.

== Career highlights ==
He reached a career-high ranking of world No. 55 in singles on 27 February 2006, while in doubles, he reached a career-high of world No. 190 on 17 August 2009.

He was coached by former ATP pros Adrian Voinea and Marcos Górriz.

Pašanski reached one ATP doubles final at 2006 Copa Telmax in Buenos Aires, partnering up with Greek Vasilis Mazarakis, which they lost to the No. 1 seeds and the defending champions from Czech Republic, František Čermák and Leoš Friedl.

During his career, he won 12 singles titles and 3 doubles titles on the ITF circuit.

Representing Malta, the country of his residence, Pašanski won silver medal in singles at Games of the Small States of Europe held in Andorra, where he lost in the final to Benjamin Balleret of Monaco.

Pašanski was also a member of the Serbia Davis Cup team and has a career 4:3 Davis Cup singles record in five ties. As part of the team, he participated in reaching the finals of 2013 Davis Cup, which Serbia lost 3:2 in a tie against Czech Republic Davis Cup team.

== Coaching career ==
After finishing his professional tennis career at the end of the 2014 season, Pašanski began his coaching career.

Being a GPTCA A-level coach, he has worked as coach with the fellow Serbian ATP players including Viktor Troicki, Nikola Milojević, Peđa Krstin, Marko Miladinović, and Hamad Medjedovic.

== Private life ==
Nicknamed Paša (Pasha), he lived in Malta, but began playing tennis at a local club near his house in Belgrade. His father, Milan, was a professor at Faculty of Political Sciences at the University of Belgrade and former chief adviser to the director of the Security Intelligence Agency.

In his youth, his father, Milan Pašanski, was also a professional basketball player, while his grandfather, Ratibor Rajko Pašanski (b. 1914), played football professionally for Željezničar Sarajevo and was a member of the Yugoslavian national football team during the Kingdom of Yugoslavia.

Pašanski stated that if he wasn’t a tennis player, he would be a guitar player...He is a big fan of Jim Morrison and Roger Waters.

Currently living and working in Belgrade, Boris Pašanski is married and has a child.

== Playing style ==
Pašanski played his best games on clay courts, with a strong baseline game capable of creating decent pace on both wings, especially effective on clay, which was also his favorite surface.

In March 2024, sports magazine Sportazzo listed him among the top 10 greatest Serbian tennis players of all time.

== Performance timeline ==
Key
W	F	SF	QF	#R	RR	Q#	DNQ	A	NH

(W) winner; (F) finalist; (SF) semifinalist; (QF) quarterfinalist; (#R) rounds 4, 3, 2, 1; (RR) round-robin stage; (Q#) qualification round; (DNQ) did not qualify; (A) absent; (NH) not held; (SR) strike rate (events won / competed); (W–L) win–loss record.

=== Singles ===
Tournament	2003	2004	2005	2006	2007	2008	2009	2010	2011	2012	2013	SR	W–L	Win%
Grand Slam tournaments
Australian Open	A	Q1	A	2R	Q2	1R	Q1	A	A	A	Q1	0 / 2	1–2	33%
French Open	A	Q1	A	1R	1R	1R	Q1	A	A	A	Q1	0 / 3	0–3	0%
Wimbledon	Q1	Q1	A	1R	A	1R	A	A	A	A	Q3	0 / 2	0–2	0%
US Open	A	A	A	1R	A	A	A	A	A	A	Q1	0 / 1	0–1	0%
Win–loss	0–0	0–0	0–0	1–4	0–1	0–3	0–0	0–0	0–0	0–0	0–0	0 / 8	1–8	11%
ATP World Tour Masters 1000
Indian Wells	A	A	A	1R	A	A	A	A	A	A	A	0 / 1	0–1	0%
Miami	A	A	A	1R	A	A	A	A	A	A	A	0 / 1	0–1	0%
Monte Carlo	A	A	A	1R	A	Q1	A	A	A	A	A	0 / 1	0–1	0%
Rome	A	A	A	1R	A	Q2	A	A	A	A	A	0 / 1	0–1	0%
Hamburg	A	A	A	1R	A	Q2	A	A	A	A	A	0 / 1	0–1	0%
Win–loss	0–0	0–0	0–0	0–5	0–0	0–0	0–0	0–0	0–0	0–0	0–0	0 / 5	0–5	0%

== ATP career finals ==
=== Doubles: 1 (1 runner-up) ===
Legend Grand Slam Tournaments (0–0) ATP World Tour Finals (0–0) ATP Masters Series (0–0) ATP Championship Series (0–0) ATP International Series (0–1)	Finals by surface Hard (0–0) Clay (0–1) Grass (0–0) Carpet (0–0)	Finals by setting Outdoors (0–1) Indoors (0–0)

Result	W–L	Date	Tournament	Tier	Surface	Partner	Opponents	Score
Loss	0–1	Feb 2006	Buenos Aires, Argentina	International Series	Clay	(Greece) Vasilis Mazarakis	(Czech Republic) František Čermák (Czech Republic) Leoš Friedl	1–6, 2–6

== ATP Challenger and ITF Futures finals ==
=== Singles: 25 (12–13) ===
Legend ATP Challenger (8–11) ITF Futures (4–2)	Finals by surface Hard (1–0) Clay (11–13) Grass (0–0) Carpet (0–0)

Result	W–L	Date	Tournament	Tier	Surface	Opponent	Score
Loss	0–1	May 2003	Hungary F1, Miskolc	Futures	Clay	(Russia) Igor Andreev	6–3, 3–6, 4–6
Loss	0–2	May 2003	Budapest, Hungary	Challenger	Clay	(Sweden) Johan Settergren	5–7, 4–6
Loss	0–3	Jun 2003	Ljubljana, Slovenia	Challenger	Clay	(Czech Republic) Jiří Vaněk	3–6, 6–3, 1–6
Win	1–3	Jul 2004	Tampere, Finland	Challenger	Clay	(France) Éric Prodon	6–2, 3–6, 6–2
Win	2–3	May 2005	Hungary F3, Hódmezővásárhely	Futures	Clay	(Israel) Amir Hadad	7–6^{(7–2)}, 6–1
Loss	2–4	May 2005	Dresden, Germany	Challenger	Clay	(Greece) Vasilis Mazarakis	3–6, 2–6
Loss	2–5	Jun 2005	Cuenca, Ecuador	Challenger	Clay	(United States) Zack Fleishman	3–6, 4–6
Win	3–5	Jul 2005	Budaors, Hungary	Challenger	Clay	(Greece) Vasilis Mazarakis	6–3, 6–2
Win	4–5	Jul 2005	Tampere, Finland	Challenger	Clay	(Croatia) Roko Karanušić	7–6^{(7–5)}, 4–6, 7–5
Loss	4–6	Aug 2005	Saransk, Russia	Challenger	Clay	(Russia) Igor Kunitsyn	5–7, 4–6
Win	5–6	Aug 2005	Samarkand, Uzbekistan	Challenger	Clay	(Greece) Vasilis Mazarakis	6–3, 6–2
Win	6–6	Sep 2005	Budapest, Hungary	Challenger	Clay	(Greece) Vasilis Mazarakis	4–6, 6–3, 6–0
Loss	6–7	Nov 2005	Montevideo, Uruguay	Challenger	Clay	(Argentina) Juan Martín del Potro	3–6, 6–2, 6–7^{(3–7)}
Win	7–7	Nov 2005	Aracaju, Brazil	Challenger	Clay	(Ecuador) Nicolás Lapentti	7–6^{(11–9)}, 7–5
Win	8–7	Jan 2006	Santiago, Chile	Challenger	Clay	(Chile) Paul Capdeville	6–2, 7–6^{(11–9)}
Loss	8–8	Nov 2006	Aracaju, Brazil	Challenger	Clay	(Argentina) Sergio Roitman	1–6, 3–6
Loss	8–9	Jul 2007	Turin, Italy	Challenger	Clay	(Argentina) Carlos Berlocq	4–6, 2–6
Win	9–9	Sep 2007	Cherkassy, Ukraine	Challenger	Clay	(Spain) Santiago Ventura	7–5, 7–6^{(9–7)}
Loss	9–10	Mar 2008	Barletta, Italy	Challenger	Clay	(Russia) Mikhail Kukushkin	3–6, 4–6
Loss	9–11	Oct 2010	Napoli, Italy	Challenger	Clay	(Italy) Fabio Fognini	4–6, 2–4 ret.
Win	10–11	Mar 2012	Italy F1, Trento	Futures	Hard	(Italy) Stefano Galvani	1–6, 6–1, 7–6^{(7–4)}
Loss	10–12	Jun 2012	Italy F14, Busto Arsizio	Futures	Clay	(Romania) Petru-Alexandru Luncanu	4–6, 6–7^{(6–8)}
Win	11–12	Aug 2012	Romania F7, Iași	Futures	Clay	(Romania) Victor Crivoi	6–7^{(6–8)}, 6–3, 7–5
Loss	11–13	Oct 2012	Rio de Janeiro, Brazil	Challenger	Clay	(Portugal) Gastão Elias	3–6, 5–7
Win	12–13	Jul 2014	France F14, Bourg-en-Bresse	Futures	Clay	(Belgium) Yannik Reuter	4–6, 6–4, 6–3

=== Doubles: 6 (3–3) ===
Legend ATP Challenger (3–1) ITF Futures (0–2)	Finals by surface Hard (0–0) Clay (3–3) Grass (0–0) Carpet (0–0)

Result	W–L	Date	Tournament	Tier	Surface	Partner	Opponents	Score
Loss	0–1	May 2005	Hungary F3, Hódmezővásárhely	Futures	Clay	(Serbia and Montenegro) Viktor Troicki	(Hungary) Norbert Pakai (Hungary) Tibor Szathmary	3–6, 3–6
Loss	0–2	Mar 2007	Rabat, Morocco	Challenger	Clay	(Australia) Peter Luczak	(Russia) Yuri Schukin (Ukraine) Orest Tereshchuk	7–6^{(10–8)}, 6–7^{(4–7)}, [3–10]
Win	1–2	Aug 2008	Manerbio, Italy	Challenger	Clay	(Italy) Thomas Fabbiano	(Italy) Massimo Dell'Acqua (Italy) Alessio di Mauro	7–6^{(9–7)}, 7–5
Win	2–2	Nov 2008	Cali, Colombia	Challenger	Clay	(Austria) Daniel Köllerer	(Argentina) Diego Junqueira (Australia) Peter Luczak	6–7^{(4–7)}, 6–4, [10–4]
Loss	2–3	Jun 2012	Italy F14, Busto Arsizio	Futures	Clay	(Italy) Antonio Comporto	(Italy) Stefano Ianni (Italy) Walter Trusendi	3–6, 3–6
Win	3–3	Sep 2012	Seville, Spain	Challenger	Clay	(Serbia) Nikola Ćirić	(Netherlands) Stephan Fransen (Netherlands) Jesse Huta Galung	5–7, 6–4, [10–6]
