= Leoš Friedl =

Czech tennis player (born 1977)

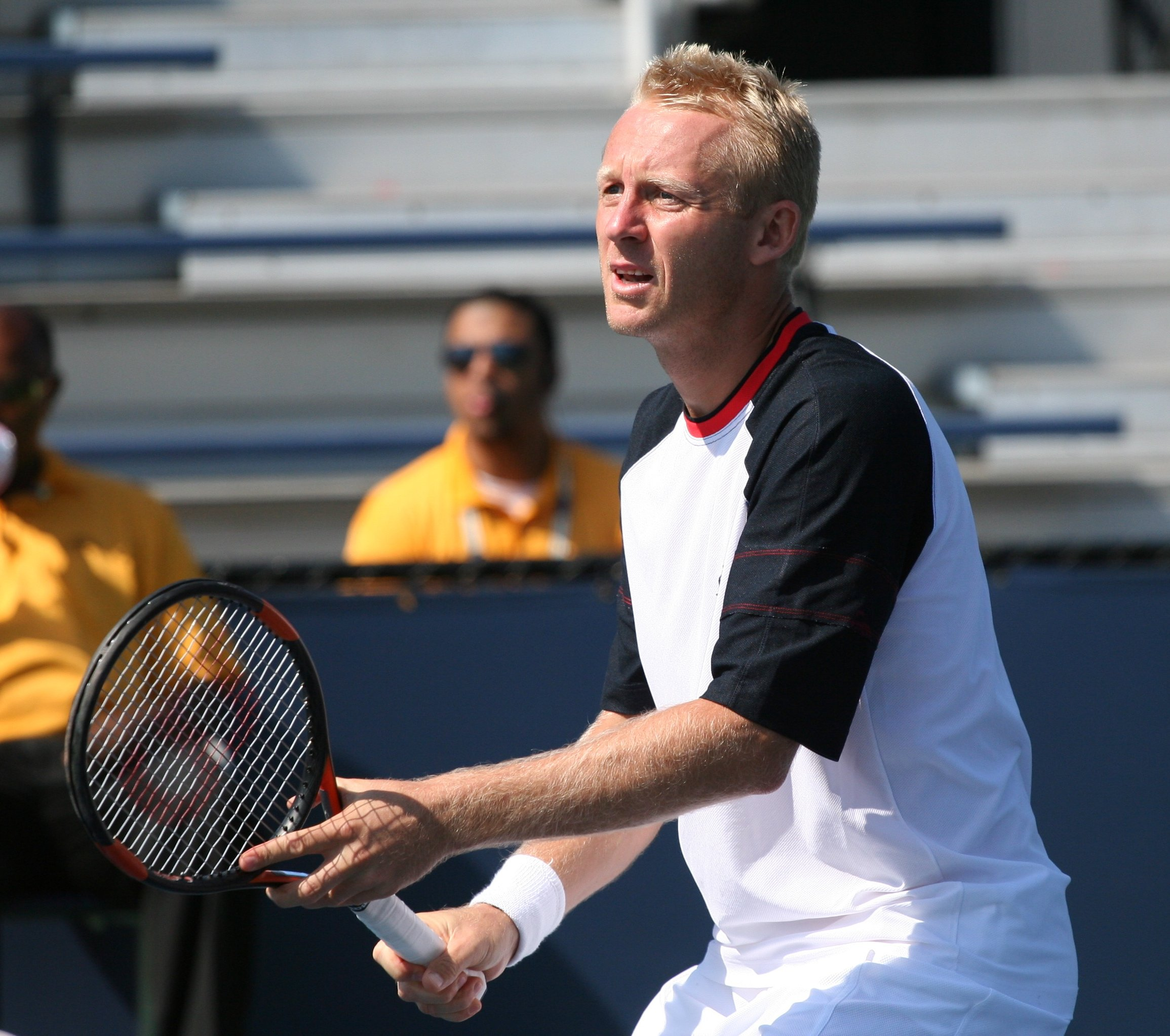
- Country (sports): Czech Republic
- Residence: Dusejov, Czech Republic
- Born: 1 January 1977 (age 48); Jindřichův Hradec, Czechoslovakia
- Height: 1.83 m (6 ft 0 in)
- Turned pro: 1997
- Retired: 2011
- Plays: Right-handed
- Coach: Lubomir Gerla
- Prize money: $1,221,403

Singles
- Career record: 3–5
- Career titles: 0
- Highest ranking: No. 353 (13 November 2000)

Grand Slam singles results
- Australian Open: Q3 (2000)
- Wimbledon: Q1 (1998)

Doubles
- Career record: 254–242
- Career titles: 16; 8 Challenger, 8 Futures
- Highest ranking: No. 14 (8 August 2005)

Grand Slam doubles results
- Australian Open: 3R (2002, 2004)
- French Open: QF (2001)
- Wimbledon: 3R (2005, 2009)
- US Open: QF (2006)

Grand Slam mixed doubles results
- Australian Open: 2R (2004, 2005, 2006)
- French Open: 2R (2003, 2006)
- Wimbledon: W (2001)
- US Open: SF (2003)
- Last updated on: 10 December 2021.

Leoš Friedl (born 1 January 1977) is a retired Czech tennis player.

Friedl's career-high ATP doubles ranking was No. 14, achieved on 8 August 2005. He often partnered in doubles with František Čermák. His career-high ATP singles ranking was No. 353, achieved on 13 November 2000.

In his career, he won 16 ATP Tour doubles titles and the 2001 Wimbledon mixed-doubles title with Daniela Hantuchová, where they beat Mike Bryan and Liezel Huber, 4–6, 6–3, 6–2.

Friedl coached Karolína Plíšková from July to December 2022.

== Grand Slam finals ==
=== Mixed doubles: (1 title) ===
| Result | Year | Championship | Surface | Partner | Opponents | Score |
|---|---|---|---|---|---|---|
| Win | 2001 | Wimbledon | Grass | (Slovakia) Daniela Hantuchová | (United States) Mike Bryan (South Africa) Liezel Huber | 4–6, 6–3, 6–2 |

== ATP career finals ==
=== Doubles: 32 (16 titles, 16 runner-ups) ===
| Legend Grand Slam Tournaments (0–0) ATP World Tour Finals (0–0) ATP Masters 1000 Series (0–0) ATP 500 Series (4–0) ATP 250 Series (12–16) | Finals by surface Hard (0–4) Clay (16–11) Grass (0–1) Carpet (0–0) | Finals by setting Outdoors (16–16) Indoors (0–0) |

| Result | W–L | Date | Tournament | Tier | Surface | Partner | Opponents | Score |
|---|---|---|---|---|---|---|---|---|
| Win | 1–0 | Jul 2000 | San Marino Open, San Marino | International Series | Clay | (Czech Republic) Tomáš Cibulec | (Argentina) Gastón Etlis (United States) Jack Waite | 7–6^{(7–1)}, 7–5 |
| Loss | 1–1 | Aug 2001 | Long Island Open, United States | International Series | Hard | (Czech Republic) Radek Štěpánek | (United States) Jonathan Stark (Zimbabwe) Kevin Ullyett | 1–6, 4–6 |
| Win | 2–1 | Jul 2002 | Sopot Open, Poland | International Series | Clay | (Czech Republic) František Čermák | (South Africa) Jeff Coetzee (Australia) Nathan Healey | 7–5, 7–5 |
| Loss | 2–2 | Sep 2002 | Palermo, Italy | International Series | Clay | (Czech Republic) František Čermák | (Argentina) Lucas Arnold Ker (Argentina) Luis Lobo | 4–6, 6–4, 2–6 |
| Loss | 2–3 | Jan 2003 | Chennai, India | International Series | Hard | (Czech Republic) František Čermák | (Austria) Julian Knowle (Germany) Michael Kohlmann | 6–7^{(1–7)}, 6–7^{(3–7)} |
| Loss | 2–4 | Jan 2003 | Auckland, New Zealand | International Series | Hard | (Czech Republic) Tomáš Cibulec | (South Africa) David Adams (South Africa) Robbie Koenig | 6–7^{(5–7)}, 6–3, 3–6 |
| Loss | 2–5 | Feb 2003 | Santiago, Chile | International Series | Clay | (Czech Republic) František Čermák | (Argentina) Agustín Calleri (Argentina) Mariano Hood | 3–6, 6–1, 4–6 |
| Win | 3–5 | Apr 2003 | Casablanca, Morocco | International Series | Clay | (Czech Republic) František Čermák | (United States) Devin Bowen (Australia) Ashley Fisher | 6–3, 7–5 |
| Loss | 3–6 | Jul 2003 | Gstaad, Switzerland | International Series | Clay | (Czech Republic) František Čermák | (India) Leander Paes (Czech Republic) David Rikl | 3–6, 3–6 |
| Loss | 3–7 | Aug 2003 | Sopot Open, Poland | International Series | Clay | (Czech Republic) František Čermák | (Poland) Mariusz Fyrstenberg (Poland) Marcin Matkowski | 4–6, 7–6^{(9–7)}, 3–6 |
| Loss | 3–8 | Sep 2003 | Palermo, Italy | International Series | Clay | (Czech Republic) František Čermák | (Argentina) Lucas Arnold Ker (Argentina) Mariano Hood | 6–7^{(6–8)}, 7–6^{(7–3)}, 3–6 |
| Loss | 3–9 | Feb 2004 | Bahia, Brazil | International Series | Clay | (Germany) Tomas Behrend | (Poland) Mariusz Fyrstenberg (Poland) Marcin Matkowski | 2–6, 2–6 |
| Loss | 3–10 | Apr 2004 | Estoril, Portugal | International Series | Clay | (Czech Republic) František Čermák | (Argentina) Juan Ignacio Chela (Argentina) Gastón Gaudio | 2–6, 1–6 |
| Loss | 3–11 | May 2004 | St. Pölten, Austria | International Series | Clay | (Czech Republic) Tomáš Cibulec | (Argentina) Mariano Hood (Czech Republic) Petr Pála | 6–3, 5–7, 4–6 |
| Win | 4–11 | Jul 2004 | Kitzbühel, Austria | Championship Series | Clay | (Czech Republic) František Čermák | (Argentina) Lucas Arnold Ker (Argentina) Martín García | 6–3, 7–5 |
| Win | 5–11 | Aug 2004 | Sopot Open, Poland | International Series | Clay | (Czech Republic) František Čermák | (Argentina) Sebastián Prieto (Argentina) Martín García | 2–6, 6–2, 6–3 |
| Win | 6–11 | Feb 2005 | Buenos Aires, Argentina | International Series | Clay | (Czech Republic) František Čermák | (Argentina) Sebastián Prieto (Argentina) José Acasuso | 6–2, 7–5 |
| Win | 7–11 | Feb 2005 | Bahia, Brazil | International Series | Clay | (Czech Republic) František Čermák | (Argentina) Ignacio González King (Argentina) José Acasuso | 6–4, 6–4 |
| Win | 8–11 | Apr 2005 | Casablanca, Morocco | International Series | Clay | (Czech Republic) František Čermák | (Argentina) Martín García (Peru) Luis Horna | 6–4, 6–3 |
| Win | 9–11 | May 2005 | Estoril, Portugal | International Series | Clay | (Czech Republic) František Čermák | (Argentina) Juan Ignacio Chela (Spain) Tommy Robredo | 6–3, 6–4 |
| Loss | 9–12 | Jun 2005 | Rosmalen, Netherlands | International Series | Grass | (Czech Republic) Tomáš Cibulec | (Czech Republic) Cyril Suk (Argentina) Pavel Vízner | 3–6, 4–6 |
| Win | 10–12 | Jul 2005 | Gstaad, Switzerland | International Series | Clay | (Czech Republic) František Čermák | (Germany) Michael Kohlmann (Germany) Rainer Schüttler | 7–6^{(8–6)}, 7–6^{(13–11)} |
| Win | 11–12 | Jul 2005 | Kitzbühel, Austria | Championship Series | Clay | (Romania) Andrei Pavel | (Belgium) Christophe Rochus (Belgium) Olivier Rochus | 6–2, 6–7^{(5–7)}, 6–0 |
| Loss | 11–13 | Jan 2006 | Sydney, Australia | International Series | Hard | (Czech Republic) František Čermák | (France) Fabrice Santoro (Serbia and Montenegro) Nenad Zimonjić | 1–6, 4–6 |
| Loss | 11–14 | Feb 2006 | Santiago, Chile | International Series | Clay | (Czech Republic) František Čermák | (Argentina) José Acasuso (Argentina) Sebastián Prieto | 6–7^{(2–7)}, 4–6 |
| Win | 12–14 | Feb 2006 | Buenos Aires, Argentina | International Series | Clay | (Czech Republic) František Čermák | (Greece) Vasilis Mazarakis (Serbia and Montenegro) Boris Pašanski | 6–1, 6–2 |
| Win | 13–14 | Mar 2006 | Acapulco, Mexico | Championship Series | Clay | (Czech Republic) František Čermák | (Italy) Potito Starace (Italy) Filippo Volandri | 7–5, 6–2 |
| Loss | 13–15 | May 2006 | Estoril, Portugal | International Series | Clay | (Argentina) Lucas Arnold Ker | (Czech Republic) Lukáš Dlouhý (Czech Republic) Pavel Vízner | 3–6, 1–6 |
| Win | 14–15 | Aug 2006 | Sopot Open, Poland | International Series | Clay | (Czech Republic) František Čermák | (Argentina) Sebastián Prieto (Argentina) Martín García | 6–3, 7–5 |
| Loss | 14–16 | May 2007 | Pörtschach, Austria | International Series | Clay | (Czech Republic) David Škoch | (Sweden) Simon Aspelin (Austria) Julian Knowle | 6–7^{(6–8)}, 7–5, [5–10] |
| Win | 15–16 | Jul 2007 | Stuttgart, Germany | Championship Series | Clay | (Czech Republic) František Čermák | (Spain) Guillermo García López (Spain) Fernando Verdasco | 6–4, 6–4 |
| Win | 16–16 | Aug 2010 | Umag, Croatia | 250 Series | Clay | (Slovakia) Filip Polášek | (Czech Republic) František Čermák (Slovakia) Michal Mertiňák | 6–3, 7–6^{(9–7)} |

== ATP Challenger and ITF Futures Finals ==
=== Singles: 1 (0–1) ===
| Legend ATP Challenger (0–0) ITF Futures (0–1) | Finals by surface Hard (0–1) Clay (0–0) Grass (0–0) Carpet (0–0) |

| Result | W–L | Date | Tournament | Tier | Surface | Opponent | Score |
|---|---|---|---|---|---|---|---|
| Loss | 0–1 | Nov 2004 | Czech Republic F6, Hrotovice | Futures | Hard | (Czech Republic) Jakub Hasek | 5–7, 4–6 |

=== Doubles: 34 (16–18) ===
| Legend ATP Challenger (8–16) ITF Futures (8–2) | Finals by surface Hard (1–1) Clay (11–14) Grass (0–0) Carpet (4–3) |

| Result | W–L | Date | Tournament | Tier | Surface | Partner | Opponents | Score |
|---|---|---|---|---|---|---|---|---|
| Win | 1–0 | Feb 1998 | Austria F1, Bergheim | Futures | Carpet | (Czech Republic) Martin Štěpánek | (Germany) Markus Menzler (Germany) Markus Wislsperger | 7–6, 3–6, 6–4 |
| Win | 2–0 | Jun 1998 | Germany F9, Villingen | Futures | Clay | (Australia) Steven Randjelovic | (Brazil) Adriano Ferreira (Brazil) Cristiano Testa | 6–4, 6–4 |
| Win | 3–0 | Jul 1998 | Slovenia F1, Kranj | Futures | Clay | (Czech Republic) Petr Kovačka | (Slovakia) Boris Borgula (Slovakia) Vladimir Platenik | 6–3, 6–3 |
| Loss | 3–1 | Jul 1998 | Slovenia F2, Portorož | Futures | Clay | (Czech Republic) Petr Kovačka | (Slovenia) Andrej Kračman (Slovenia) Blaž Trupej | 4–6, 5–7 |
| Win | 4–1 | Aug 1998 | Slovenia F4, Ljubljana | Futures | Clay | (Czech Republic) Petr Kovačka | (Czech Republic) Jan Vacek (Czech Republic) Jan Hernych | 6–3, 6–2 |
| Loss | 4–2 | Aug 1998 | Nettingsdorf, Austria | Challenger | Clay | (Czech Republic) Tomáš Cibulec | (Czech Republic) Tomáš Krupa (Slovenia) Borut Urh | 1–6, 4–6 |
| Win | 5–2 | Sep 1998 | Alpirsbach, Germany | Challenger | Clay | (Czech Republic) Tomáš Cibulec | (Germany) Marcus Hilpert (Switzerland) Filippo Veglio | 6–1, 7–6 |
| Loss | 5–3 | Sep 1998 | Brașov, Romania | Challenger | Clay | (Czech Republic) Tomáš Cibulec | (Spain) Juan Ignacio Carrasco (Spain) Jairo Velasco | 4–6, 6–3, 2–6 |
| Loss | 5–4 | Sep 1998 | Budapest, Hungary | Challenger | Clay | (Czech Republic) Radek Štěpánek | (Hungary) Gábor Köves (Austria) Thomas Strengberger | 4–6, 4–6 |
| Win | 6–4 | Feb 1999 | Great Britain F1, Leeds | Futures | Carpet | (Slovenia) Borut Urh | (France) Régis Lavergne (Croatia) Ivan Ljubičić | 7–6, 7–5 |
| Win | 7–4 | Feb 1999 | Great Britain F2, Chigwell | Futures | Carpet | (Slovenia) Borut Urh | (United Kingdom) David Sherwood (United Kingdom) Tom Spinks | 7–6, 6–1 |
| Loss | 7–5 | Feb 1999 | Great Britain F3, Eastbourne | Futures | Carpet | (France) Régis Lavergne | (United Kingdom) James Davidson (United Kingdom) Kyle Spencer | 6–7, 4–6 |
| Loss | 7–6 | Apr 1999 | Nice, France | Challenger | Clay | (Czech Republic) Tomáš Cibulec | (Argentina) Sebastián Prieto (Argentina) Martín García | 6–7, 4–6 |
| Win | 8–6 | Jul 1999 | Slovenia F1, Kranj | Futures | Clay | (Czech Republic) Petr Kovačka | (Slovakia) Tomáš Čatár (Slovakia) Vladimir Platenik | 5–7, 6–2, 6–4 |
| Win | 9–6 | Jul 1999 | Slovenia F2, Portorož | Futures | Clay | (Czech Republic) Petr Kovačka | (Croatia) Ivo Karlović (Croatia) Goran Orešić | 7–5, 6–4 |
| Loss | 9–7 | Aug 1999 | Prague, Czech Republic | Challenger | Clay | (Czech Republic) Petr Dezort | (Czech Republic) Petr Kovačka (Czech Republic) Pavel Kudrnáč | 0–6, 1–6 |
| Loss | 9–8 | Sep 1999 | Budapest, Hungary | Challenger | Clay | (Czech Republic) Daniel Fiala | (Israel) Harel Levy (Israel) Noam Okun | 4–6, 6–4, 2–6 |
| Win | 10–8 | Feb 2000 | Hamburg, Germany | Challenger | Carpet | (Czech Republic) Tomáš Cibulec | (Germany) Marc Gienke (Germany) Florian Jeschonek | 4–6, 6–3, 6–2 |
| Loss | 10–9 | Feb 2000 | Wolfsburg, Germany | Challenger | Carpet | (Czech Republic) Tomáš Cibulec | (Germany) Jan-Ralph Brandt (Germany) Martin Sinner | 5–7, 6–3, 6–7^{(7–9)} |
| Win | 11–9 | Apr 2000 | Cagliari, Italy | Challenger | Clay | (Czech Republic) Tomáš Cibulec | (Italy) Andrea Gaudenzi (Italy) Diego Nargiso | 6–1, 3–6, 7–5 |
| Win | 12–9 | Apr 2000 | Maia, Portugal | Challenger | Clay | (Czech Republic) Tomáš Cibulec | (Czech Republic) Petr Pála (Czech Republic) Pavel Vízner | 6–3, 4–6, 6–4 |
| Loss | 12–10 | Aug 2000 | Poznań, Poland | Challenger | Clay | (Czech Republic) Tomáš Cibulec | (Czech Republic) Petr Pála (Czech Republic) Pavel Vízner | 3–6, 0–6 |
| Loss | 12–11 | Aug 2000 | Prague, Czech Republic | Challenger | Clay | (Czech Republic) Tomáš Cibulec | (Czech Republic) František Čermák (Czech Republic) Ota Fukárek | 4–6, 3–6 |
| Win | 13–11 | Sep 2000 | Graz, Austria | Challenger | Clay | (Czech Republic) Tomáš Cibulec | (Czech Republic) Pavel Kudrnáč (Czech Republic) Petr Kovačka | 6–4, 4–6, 6–4 |
| Win | 14–11 | Jul 2002 | Ulm, Germany | Challenger | Clay | (Czech Republic) David Škoch | (Australia) Tim Crichton (Australia) Todd Perry | 6–3, 4–6, 7–5 |
| Win | 15–11 | Aug 2002 | San Marino, San Marino | Challenger | Clay | (Czech Republic) David Škoch | (Italy) Massimo Bertolini (Italy) Cristian Brandi | 6–2, 6–4 |
| Loss | 15–12 | Sep 2002 | Szczecin, Poland | Challenger | Clay | (Czech Republic) David Škoch | (Argentina) José Acasuso (Argentina) Andrés Schneiter | 4–6, 5–7 |
| Loss | 15–13 | Nov 2002 | Bratislava, Slovakia | Challenger | Carpet | (Czech Republic) David Škoch | (United States) Scott Humphries (The Bahamas) Mark Merklein | 6–3, 4–6, 2–6 |
| Loss | 15–14 | Apr 2007 | Marrakech, Morocco | Challenger | Clay | (Slovakia) Michal Mertiňák | (Czech Republic) Tomáš Cibulec (Australia) Jordan Kerr | 2–6, 4–6 |
| Loss | 15–15 | May 2007 | Prague, Czech Republic | Challenger | Clay | (Czech Republic) David Škoch | (Czech Republic) Tomáš Cibulec (Australia) Jordan Kerr | 4–6, 2–6 |
| Loss | 15–16 | Jun 2007 | Prostějov, Czech Republic | Challenger | Clay | (Czech Republic) Tomáš Cibulec | (Paraguay) Ramón Delgado (Argentina) Juan Pablo Guzmán | 6–7^{(8–10)}, 1–6 |
| Loss | 15–17 | Nov 2009 | Bratislava, Slovakia | Challenger | Hard | (Czech Republic) David Škoch | (Germany) Philipp Marx (Slovakia) Igor Zelenay | 4–6, 4–6 |
| Loss | 15–18 | May 2010 | Bordeaux, France | Challenger | Clay | (Slovakia) Karol Beck | (France) Nicolas Mahut (France) Édouard Roger-Vasselin | 7–5, 3–6, [7–10] |
| Win | 16–18 | Aug 2010 | Istanbul, Turkey | Challenger | Hard | (Serbia) Dušan Vemić | (United States) Brian Battistone (Sweden) Andreas Siljeström | 7–6^{(8–6)}, 7–6^{(7–3)} |

== Performance timelines ==
Key
| W | F | SF | QF | #R | RR | Q# | DNQ | A | NH |

(W) winner; (F) finalist; (SF) semifinalist; (QF) quarterfinalist; (#R) rounds 4, 3, 2, 1; (RR) round-robin stage; (Q#) qualification round; (DNQ) did not qualify; (A) absent; (NH) not held; (SR) strike rate (events won / competed); (W–L) win–loss record.

=== Doubles ===
| Tournament | 2000 | 2001 | 2002 | 2003 | 2004 | 2005 | 2006 | 2007 | 2008 | 2009 | 2010 | 2011 | SR | W–L | Win% |
|---|---|---|---|---|---|---|---|---|---|---|---|---|---|---|---|
Grand Slam tournaments
| Australian Open | A | 2R | 3R | 2R | 3R | 1R | 2R | 1R | 2R | A | 1R | A | 0 / 9 | 8–9 | 47% |
| French Open | A | QF | 1R | 3R | 3R | 3R | 2R | 2R | A | 2R | 1R | A | 0 / 9 | 12–9 | 57% |
| Wimbledon | 1R | 2R | 2R | 2R | 1R | 3R | 1R | 2R | A | 3R | 1R | 1R | 0 / 11 | 8–11 | 42% |
| US Open | 1R | 2R | 1R | 3R | 1R | 2R | QF | 2R | A | 3R | 1R | A | 0 / 10 | 10–10 | 50% |
| Win–loss | 0–2 | 6–4 | 3–4 | 6–4 | 4–4 | 5–4 | 5–4 | 3–4 | 1–1 | 5–3 | 0–4 | 0–1 | 0 / 39 | 38–39 | 49% |
ATP World Tour Masters 1000
| Indian Wells | A | Q1 | A | A | 1R | 2R | 2R | 1R | 1R | A | A | A | 0 / 5 | 2–5 | 29% |
| Miami | A | 1R | 1R | 1R | 2R | 1R | 1R | 1R | 1R | A | A | A | 0 / 8 | 1–8 | 11% |
| Monte Carlo | A | 1R | 1R | SF | 2R | 1R | 2R | A | A | A | A | A | 0 / 6 | 4–6 | 40% |
| Rome | A | Q1 | 1R | 1R | 2R | 1R | 2R | A | A | A | A | A | 0 / 5 | 2–5 | 29% |
| Madrid | NH | | A | A | A | 1R | 1R | A | A | A | A | A | 0 / 2 | 0–2 | 0% |
| Canada | A | 2R | A | 2R | 1R | 2R | 1R | A | A | A | A | A | 0 / 5 | 3–5 | 38% |
| Cincinnati | A | 1R | A | 2R | 2R | 2R | 1R | A | A | A | A | A | 0 / 5 | 3–5 | 38% |
| Hamburg | A | A | 1R | 2R | 1R | 2R | QF | A | A | NMS | | | 0 / 5 | 3–5 | 38% |
| Win–loss | 0–0 | 1–4 | 0–4 | 6–6 | 4–7 | 4–8 | 3–8 | 0–2 | 0–2 | 0–0 | 0–0 | 0–0 | 0 / 41 | 18–41 | 31% |

=== Mixed doubles ===
| Tournament | 2001 | 2002 | 2003 | 2004 | 2005 | 2006 | 2007 | 2008 | 2009 | 2010 | SR | W–L | Win% |
|---|---|---|---|---|---|---|---|---|---|---|---|---|---|
Grand Slam tournaments
| Australian Open | A | A | A | 2R | 2R | 2R | 1R | A | A | A | 0 / 4 | 3–4 | 43% |
| French Open | A | A | 2R | 1R | 1R | 2R | A | A | 1R | A | 0 / 5 | 2–5 | 29% |
| Wimbledon | W | 1R | SF | 3R | 3R | 2R | 2R | A | A | 1R | 1 / 8 | 13–7 | 65% |
| US Open | A | A | SF | 1R | 1R | 1R | A | A | A | A | 0 / 4 | 3–4 | 50% |
| Win–loss | 6–0 | 0–1 | 8–3 | 2–4 | 2–4 | 2–4 | 1–2 | 0–0 | 0–1 | 0–1 | 1 / 21 | 21–20 | 51% |
