= František Čermák =

Czech tennis player (born 1976)

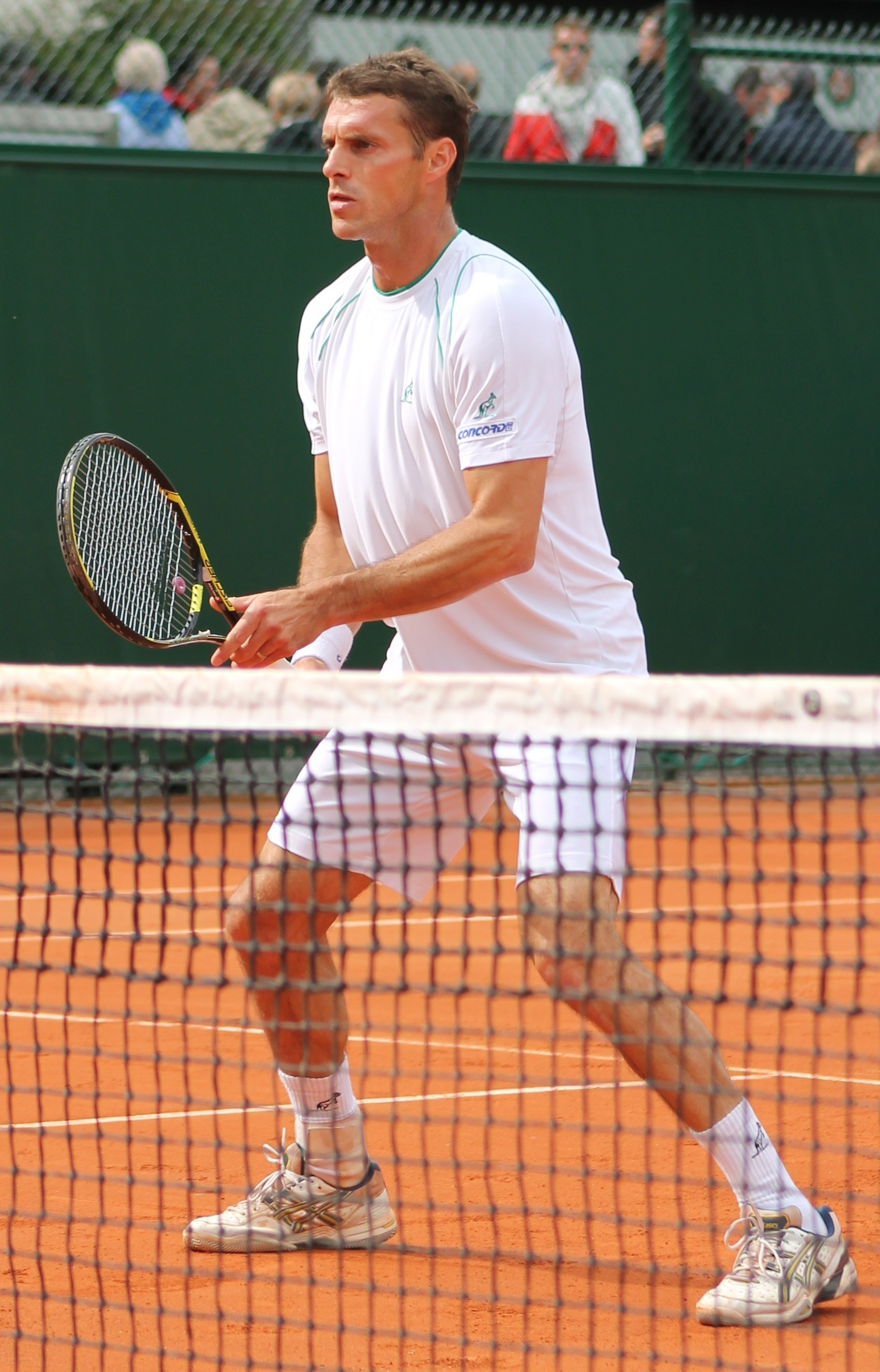
- Country (sports): Czech Republic
- Residence: Koštice, Czech Republic
- Born: 14 November 1976 (age 49) Valtice, Czechoslovakia
- Height: 1.93 m (6 ft 4 in)
- Turned pro: 1998
- Retired: 2016
- Plays: Right-handed (two-handed backhand)
- Prize money: $2,418,073

Singles
- Career record: 9–16
- Highest ranking: No. 201 (27 October 2003)

Grand Slam singles results
- Australian Open: Q3 (2001)
- French Open: Q2 (2003)
- Wimbledon: Q1 (2000, 2001)
- US Open: Q2 (2000)

Doubles
- Career record: 410–315
- Career titles: 31
- Highest ranking: No. 14 (1 February 2010)

Grand Slam doubles results
- Australian Open: 3R (2004, 2007, 2008, 2012)
- French Open: 3R (2002, 2003, 2004, 2005, 2010, 2011)
- Wimbledon: 3R (2005, 2008)
- US Open: 3R (2003, 2012)

Mixed doubles
- Career titles: 1

Grand Slam mixed doubles results
- Australian Open: F (2013)
- French Open: W (2013)
- Wimbledon: 2R (2011, 2013)
- US Open: SF (2012)

Team competitions
- Davis Cup: W (2012)

František Čermák (born 14 November 1976) is a Czech former professional tennis player.

== Career ==
In his career, Čermák won 31 doubles titles on the ATP Tour and he was a finalist 24 times. He achieved a career-high doubles ranking of world No. 14 in February 2010, and he usually played doubles with Filip Polášek.

In mixed doubles, Čermák and partner Lucie Hradecká reached the final of the 2013 Australian Open and won the 2013 French Open.

In singles, he won one Challenger title and ten Futures titles, reaching a career-high singles ranking of world No. 201 in October 2003.

=== Davis Cup ===
Čermák was a member of the winning Czech Republic team in the 2012 Davis Cup.

== Grand Slam finals ==
=== Mixed doubles: 2 (1 title, 1 runner-up) ===
Result	Year	Championship	Surface	Partner	Opponents	Score
Loss	2013	Australian Open	Hard	(Czech Republic) Lucie Hradecká	(Australia) Jarmila Gajdošová (Australia) Matthew Ebden	3–6, 5–7
Win	2013	French Open	Clay	(Czech Republic) Lucie Hradecká	(France) Kristina Mladenovic (Canada) Daniel Nestor	1–6, 6–4, [10–6]

== ATP career finals ==
=== Doubles: 55 (31 titles, 24 runner-ups) ===
Legend Grand Slam tournaments (0–0) ATP International Series Gold / ATP World Tour 500 Series (5–2) ATP International Series / ATP World Tour 250 Series (26–22)	Finals by surface Hard (5–9) Clay (25–12) Grass (1–0) Carpet (0–3)	Finals by setting Outdoor (26–16) Indoor (5–8)

Result	W–L	Date	Tournament	Tier	Surface	Partner	Opponents	Score
Win	1–0	Jul 2002	Umag Open, Croatia	International	Clay	(Austria) Julian Knowle	(Spain) Albert Portas (Spain) Fernando Vicente	6–4, 6–4
Win	2–0	Jul 2002	Sopot Open, Poland	International	Clay	(Czech Republic) Leoš Friedl	(South Africa) Jeff Coetzee (Australia) Nathan Healey	7–5, 7–5
Loss	2–1	Sep 2002	Campionati Internazionali di Sicilia, Italy	International	Clay	(Czech Republic) Leoš Friedl	(Argentina) Lucas Arnold Ker (Argentina) Luis Lobo	4–6, 6–4, 2–6
Loss	2–2	Jan 2003	Chennai Open, India	International	Hard	(Czech Republic) Leoš Friedl	(Austria) Julian Knowle (Germany) Michael Kohlmann	6–7^{(1–7)}, 6–7^{(3–7)}
Loss	2–3	Feb 2003	Santiago Open, Chile	International	Clay	(Czech Republic) Leoš Friedl	(Argentina) Agustín Calleri (Argentina) Mariano Hood	3–6, 6–1, 4–6
Win	3–3	Apr 2003	Grand Prix Hassan II, Morocco	International	Clay	(Czech Republic) Leoš Friedl	(United States) Devin Bowen (Australia) Ashley Fisher	6–3, 7–5
Loss	3–4	Jul 2003	Gstaad Open, Switzerland	International	Clay	(Czech Republic) Leoš Friedl	(India) Leander Paes (Czech Republic) David Rikl	3–6, 3–6
Loss	3–5	Aug 2003	Sopot Open, Poland	International	Clay	(Czech Republic) Leoš Friedl	(Poland) Mariusz Fyrstenberg (Poland) Marcin Matkowski	4–6, 7–6^{(9–7)}, 3–6
Loss	3–6	Sep 2003	Campionati Internazionali di Sicilia, Italy	International	Clay	(Czech Republic) Leoš Friedl	(Argentina) Lucas Arnold Ker (Argentina) Mariano Hood	6–7^{(6–8)}, 7–6^{(7–3)}, 3–6
Loss	3–7	Apr 2004	Estoril Open, Portugal	International	Clay	(Czech Republic) Leoš Friedl	(Argentina) Juan Ignacio Chela (Argentina) Gastón Gaudio	2–6, 1–6
Win	4–7	Jul 2004	Austrian Open Kitzbühel, Austria	Intl. Gold	Clay	(Czech Republic) Leoš Friedl	(Argentina) Lucas Arnold Ker (Argentina) Martín García	6–3, 7–5
Win	5–7	Aug 2004	Sopot Open, Poland (2)	International	Clay	(Czech Republic) Leoš Friedl	(Argentina) Martín García (Argentina) Sebastián Prieto	2–6, 6–2, 6–3
Win	6–7	Feb 2005	Buenos Aires Open, Argentina	International	Clay	(Czech Republic) Leoš Friedl	(Argentina) José Acasuso (Argentina) Sebastián Prieto	6–2, 7–5
Win	7–7	Feb 2005	Bahia Open, Brazil	International	Clay	(Czech Republic) Leoš Friedl	(Argentina) José Acasuso (Argentina) Ignacio González King	6–4, 6–4
Win	8–7	Apr 2005	Grand Prix Hassan II, Morocco (2)	International	Clay	(Czech Republic) Leoš Friedl	(Argentina) Martín García (Peru) Luis Horna	6–4, 6–3
Win	9–7	May 2005	Estoril Open, Portugal	International	Clay	(Czech Republic) Leoš Friedl	(Argentina) Juan Ignacio Chela (Spain) Tommy Robredo	6–3, 6–4
Win	10–7	Jul 2005	Gstaad Open, Switzerland	International	Clay	(Czech Republic) Leoš Friedl	(Germany) Michael Kohlmann (Germany) Rainer Schüttler	7–6^{(8–6)}, 7–6^{(13–11)}
Loss	10–8	Jan 2006	Sydney International, Australia	International	Hard	(Czech Republic) Leoš Friedl	(France) Fabrice Santoro (Serbia and Montenegro) Nenad Zimonjić	1–6, 4–6
Loss	10–9	Feb 2006	Santiago Open, Chile	International	Clay	(Czech Republic) Leoš Friedl	(Argentina) José Acasuso (Argentina) Sebastián Prieto	6–7^{(2–7)}, 4–6
Win	11–9	Feb 2006	Buenos Aires Open, Argentina (2)	International	Clay	(Czech Republic) Leoš Friedl	(Greece) Vasilis Mazarakis (Serbia and Montenegro) Boris Pašanski	6–1, 6–2
Win	12–9	Mar 2006	Acapulco Open, Mexico	Intl. Gold	Clay	(Czech Republic) Leoš Friedl	(Italy) Potito Starace (Italy) Filippo Volandri	7–5, 6–2
Win	13–9	Aug 2006	Sopot Open, Poland (3)	International	Clay	(Czech Republic) Leoš Friedl	(Argentina) Martín García (Argentina) Sebastián Prieto	6–3, 7–5
Loss	13–10	Oct 2006	Kremlin Cup, Russia	International	Carpet (i)	(Czech Republic) Jaroslav Levinský	(France) Fabrice Santoro (Serbia) Nenad Zimonjić	1–6, 5–7
Loss	13–11	Oct 2006	Grand Prix de Tennis de Lyon, France	International	Carpet (i)	(Czech Republic) Jaroslav Levinský	(France) Julien Benneteau (France) Arnaud Clément	2–6, 7–6^{(7–3)}, [7–10]
Loss	13–12	Feb 2007	Zagreb Indoors, Croatia	International	Carpet (i)	(Czech Republic) Jaroslav Levinský	(Germany) Michael Kohlmann (Germany) Alexander Waske	6–7^{(5–7)}, 6–4, [5–10]
Win	14–12	Jul 2007	Gstaad Open, Switzerland (2)	International	Clay	(Czech Republic) Pavel Vízner	(France) Marc Gicquel (France) Florent Serra	7–5, 5–7, [10–7]
Win	15–12	Jul 2007	Stuttgart Open, Germany	Intl. Gold	Clay	(Czech Republic) Leoš Friedl	(Spain) Guillermo García López (Spain) Fernando Verdasco	6–4, 6–4
Win	16–12	Jul 2008	Dutch Open, Netherlands	International	Clay	(Netherlands) Rogier Wassen	(Netherlands) Jesse Huta Galung (Netherlands) Igor Sijsling	7–5, 7–5
Loss	16–13	Jun 2009	Santiago Open, Chile	250 Series	Clay	(Slovakia) Michal Mertiňák	(Uruguay) Pablo Cuevas (Argentina) Brian Dabul	3–6, 3–6
Win	17–13	Feb 2009	Acapulco Open, Mexico (2)	500 Series	Clay	(Slovakia) Michal Mertiňák	(Poland) Łukasz Kubot (Austria) Oliver Marach	4–6, 6–4, [10–7]
Win	18–13	Jul 2009	Stuttgart Open, Germany (2)	250 Series	Clay	(Slovakia) Michal Mertiňák	(Romania) Victor Hănescu (Romania) Horia Tecău	7–5, 6–4
Win	19–13	Aug 2009	Umag Open, Croatia (2)	250 Series	Clay	(Slovakia) Michal Mertiňák	(Sweden) Johan Brunström (Netherlands Antilles) Jean-Julien Rojer	6–4, 6–4
Win	20–13	Sep 2009	Bucharest Open, Romania	250 Series	Clay	(Slovakia) Michal Mertiňák	(Sweden) Johan Brunström (Netherlands Antilles) Jean-Julien Rojer	6–2, 6–4
Loss	20–14	Oct 2009	Kremlin Cup, Russia	250 Series	Hard (i)	(Slovakia) Michal Mertiňák	(Uruguay) Pablo Cuevas (Spain) Marcel Granollers	6–4, 5–7, [8–10]
Win	21–14	Nov 2009	Valencia Open, Spain	500 Series	Hard (i)	(Slovakia) Michal Mertiňák	(Spain) Marcel Granollers (Spain) Tommy Robredo	6–4, 6–3
Loss	21–15	Jan 2010	Qatar Open, Qatar	250 Series	Hard	(Slovakia) Michal Mertiňák	(Spain) Guillermo García López (Spain) Albert Montañés	4–6, 5–7
Loss	21–16	Aug 2010	Umag Open, Croatia	250 Series	Clay	(Slovakia) Michal Mertiňák	(Czech Republic) Leoš Friedl (Czech Republic) Filip Polášek	3–6, 6–7^{(7–9)}
Win	22–16	Oct 2010	Kuala Lumpur Open, Malaysia	250 Series	Hard (i)	(Slovakia) Michal Mertiňák	(Poland) Mariusz Fyrstenberg (Poland) Marcin Matkowski	7–6^{(7–3)}, 7–6^{(7–5)}
Win	23–16	May 2011	Belgrade Open, Serbia	250 Series	Clay	(Slovakia) Filip Polášek	(Austria) Oliver Marach (Austria) Alexander Peya	7–5, 6–2
Win	24–16	Jun 2011	Rosmalen Championships, Netherlands	250 Series	Grass	(Italy) Daniele Bracciali	(Sweden) Robert Lindstedt (Romania) Horia Tecău	6–3, 2–6, [10–8]
Loss	24–17	Jul 2011	Hamburg European Open, Germany	500 Series	Clay	(Slovakia) Filip Polášek	(Austria) Oliver Marach (Austria) Alexander Peya	4–6, 1–6
Win	25–17	Jul 2011	Gstaad Open, Switzerland (3)	250 Series	Clay	(Slovakia) Filip Polášek	(Germany) Christopher Kas (Austria) Alexander Peya	6–3, 7–6^{(9–7)}
Loss	25–18	Oct 2011	Kuala Lumpur Open, Malaysia	250 Series	Hard (i)	(Slovakia) Filip Polášek	(United States) Eric Butorac (Curaçao) Jean-Julien Rojer	1–6, 3–6
Loss	25–19	Oct 2011	Tokyo Outdoor, Japan	500 Series	Hard	(Slovakia) Filip Polášek	(United Kingdom) Andy Murray (United Kingdom) Jamie Murray	1–6, 4–6
Win	26–19	Oct 2011	Kremlin Cup, Russia	250 Series	Hard (i)	(Slovakia) Filip Polášek	(Argentina) Carlos Berlocq (Spain) David Marrero	6–3, 6–1
Loss	26–20	Jan 2012	Auckland Open, New Zealand	250 Series	Hard (i)	(Slovakia) Filip Polášek	(Austria) Oliver Marach (Austria) Alexander Peya	3–6, 2–6
Win	27–20	May 2012	Bavarian Championships, Germany	250 Series	Clay	(Slovakia) Filip Polášek	(Belgium) Xavier Malisse (Belgium) Dick Norman	6–4, 7–5
Win	28–20	Jul 2012	Open Kitzbühel, Austria (2)	250 Series	Clay	(Austria) Julian Knowle	(Germany) Dustin Brown (Australia) Paul Hanley	7–6^{(7–4)}, 3–6, [12–10]
Win	29–20	Oct 2012	Kremlin Cup, Russia (2)	250 Series	Hard (i)	(Slovakia) Michal Mertiňák	(Italy) Simone Bolelli (Italy) Daniele Bracciali	7–5, 6–3
Loss	29–21	Feb 2013	Brasil Open, Brazil	250 Series	Clay (i)	(Slovakia) Michal Mertiňák	(Austria) Alexander Peya (Brazil) Bruno Soares	7–6^{(7–5)}, 2–6, [7–10]
Loss	29–22	Aug 2013	Open Kitzbühel, Austria	250 Series	Clay	(Czech Republic) Lukáš Dlouhý	(Germany) Martin Emmrich (Germany) Christopher Kas	4–6, 3–6
Loss	29–23	Feb 2014	Delray Beach Open, United States	250 Series	Hard	(Russia) Mikhail Elgin	(United States) Bob Bryan (United States) Mike Bryan	2–6, 3–6
Win	30–23	Jul 2014	Umag Open, Croatia (3)	250 Series	Clay	(Czech Republic) Lukáš Rosol	(Serbia) Dušan Lajović (Croatia) Franko Škugor	6–4, 7–6^{(7–5)}
Win	31–23	Oct 2014	Kremlin Cup, Russia (3)	250 Series	Hard (i)	(Czech Republic) Jiří Veselý	(Australia) Sam Groth (Australia) Chris Guccione	7–6^{(7–2)}, 7–5
Loss	31–24	Oct 2015	Kremlin Cup, Russia	250 Series	Hard (i)	(Moldova) Radu Albot	(Russia) Andrey Rublev (Russia) Dmitry Tursunov	6–2, 1–6, [6–10]

== Doubles performance timeline ==
Key
W	F	SF	QF	#R	RR	Q#	DNQ	A	NH

(W) winner; (F) finalist; (SF) semifinalist; (QF) quarterfinalist; (#R) rounds 4, 3, 2, 1; (RR) round-robin stage; (Q#) qualification round; (DNQ) did not qualify; (A) absent; (NH) not held; (SR) strike rate (events won / competed); (W–L) win–loss record.

Tournament	2001	2002	2003	2004	2005	2006	2007	2008	2009	2010	2011	2012	2013	2014	2015	2016	SR	W–L
Grand Slam tournaments
Australian Open	2R	1R	2R	3R	1R	2R	3R	3R	2R	1R	1R	3R	1R	A	1R	A	0 / 14	12–14
French Open	2R	3R	3R	3R	3R	2R	1R	2R	2R	3R	3R	2R	2R	1R	2R	A	0 / 15	19–15
Wimbledon	1R	1R	2R	1R	3R	1R	2R	3R	2R	2R	2R	1R	2R	1R	1R	A	0 / 15	10–15
US Open	1R	2R	3R	1R	2R	2R	2R	A	2R	1R	1R	3R	1R	1R	2R	A	0 / 14	10–13
Win–loss	2–4	3–4	6–4	4–4	5–4	3–4	4–4	5–3	4–4	3–4	3–4	5–4	2–4	0–3	2–3	0–0	0 / 58	51–57
ATP Masters Series 1000
Indian Wells	A	A	A	A	2R	2R	1R	2R	1R	QF	A	A	A	A	A	A	0 / 6	4–5
Miami	A	A	1R	A	1R	1R	2R	1R	QF	2R	A	1R	A	A	A	A	0 / 8	4–8
Monte Carlo	A	A	SF	2R	1R	A	2R	QF	1R	1R	A	2R	A	A	A	A	0 / 8	6–8
Rome	A	A	1R	2R	1R	A	A	A	1R	2R	A	1R	A	A	A	A	0 / 6	2–6
Hamburg	A	A	2R	1R	A	A	A	2R	Held as Madrid (Clay)								0 / 3	2–3
Madrid (Clay)	Held as Hamburg								QF	2R	A	2R	A	A	A	A	0 / 3	3–3
Canada	A	A	2R	1R	A	1R	A	A	A	SF	A	A	A	A	A	A	0 / 4	4–4
Cincinnati	A	A	2R	2R	A	1R	1R	A	1R	QF	A	A	A	A	A	A	0 / 6	4–6
Madrid (Hard)	A	A	A	A	1R	A	2R	A	Held as Shanghai								0 / 2	1–2
Shanghai	Not Held								QF	QF	A	A	A	A	A	A	0 / 2	3–2
Paris	A	A	A	A	1R	1R	2R	A	SF	SF	2R	1R	A	A	A	A	0 / 7	5–7
Career statistics
Titles / Finals	0 / 0	2 / 3	1 / 6	2 / 3	5 / 5	3 / 7	2 / 3	1 / 1	5 / 7	1 / 3	4 / 7	3 / 4	0 / 2	2 / 3	0 / 1	0 / 0	31 / 55	
Year-end ranking	88	41	28	26	23	24	31	34	16	24	22	30	69	61	90	884		
