= 2011 Brasil Open – Doubles =

Doubles
- 2011 Brasil Open

Final
- Champions: (Brazil) Marcelo Melo (Brazil) Bruno Soares
- Runners-up: (Spain) Pablo Andújar (Spain) Daniel Gimeno-Traver
- Score: 7–6^{(7–4)}, 6–3

Details
- Draw: 16
- Seeds: 4

Events
Singles	Doubles
← 2010 ·	Brasil Open	· 2012 →

Pablo Cuevas and Marcel Granollers were the defending champions, but Granollers chose to compete in Rotterdam.
Cuevas played with Eduardo Schwank, but lost to Fabio Fognini and David Marrero in the quarterfinals.
Marcelo Melo and Bruno Soares won the title, defeating Pablo Andújar and Daniel Gimeno-Traver 7–6^{(7–4)}, 6–3 in the final.

== Seeds ==
1. (Poland) Łukasz Kubot / (Austria) Oliver Marach (first round)
2. (Brazil) Marcelo Melo / (Brazil) Bruno Soares (champions)
3. (Italy) Daniele Bracciali / (Italy) Potito Starace (first round)
4. (Uruguay) Pablo Cuevas / (Argentina) Eduardo Schwank (quarterfinals)

== Draw ==
=== Key ===
- Q = Qualifier
- WC = Wild card
- LL = Lucky loser
- Alt = Alternate
- ITF = ITF entry
- PR = Protected ranking
- SR = Special ranking
- SE = Special exempt
- JE = Junior exempt
- JR = Junior Accelerator Programme entrant
- CO = College Accelerator Programme entrant
- NG = Next Gen Accelerator Program entrant
- w/o = Walkover
- r = Retired
- d = Defaulted

=== Draw ===
First round
1	(Poland) Ł Kubot (Austria) O Marach	6^{6}	5
(Argentina) C Berlocq (Portugal) L Tavares	7	7
(Spain) P Andújar (Spain) D Gimeno-Traver	6	6
WC	(Brazil) A Laranja (Brazil) F Romboli	4	3
3	(Italy) D Bracciali (Italy) P Starace	4	3
WC	(Brazil) R Dutra da Silva (Brazil) J Silva	6	6
(Spain) A Montañés (Spain) R Ramírez Hidalgo	6	6^{7}	[10]
(Brazil) F Ferreiro (Brazil) A Sá	3	7	[5]
(Romania) V Hănescu (Italy) F Volandri	3	4
(Italy) F Fognini (Spain) D Marrero	6	6
(Spain) N Almagro (Argentina) JI Chela	4	4
4	(Uruguay) P Cuevas (Argentina) E Schwank	6	6
(Colombia) S Giraldo (Argentina) L Mayer	4	4
(Russia) I Andreev (Ukraine) A Dolgopolov	6	6
(Czech Republic) F Čermák (Czech Republic) L Friedl	6^{4}	7	[11]
2	(Brazil) M Melo (Brazil) B Soares	7	5	[13]

Quarterfinals
(Argentina) C Berlocq (Portugal) L Tavares	3	2
(Spain) P Andújar (Spain) D Gimeno-Traver	6	6
WC	(Brazil) R Dutra da Silva (Brazil) J Silva	4	6^{6}
(Spain) A Montañés (Spain) R Ramírez Hidalgo	6	7
(Italy) F Fognini (Spain) D Marrero	7	6
4	(Uruguay) P Cuevas (Argentina) E Schwank	6^{5}	2
(Russia) I Andreev (Ukraine) A Dolgopolov	7	2	[8]
2	(Brazil) M Melo (Brazil) B Soares	6^{3}	6	[10]

Semifinals
(Spain) P Andújar (Spain) D Gimeno-Traver	6	6
(Spain) A Montañés (Spain) R Ramírez Hidalgo	1	4
(Italy) F Fognini (Spain) D Marrero	3	4
2	(Brazil) M Melo (Brazil) B Soares	6	6

Finals
(Spain) P Andújar (Spain) D Gimeno-Traver	6^{4}	3
2	(Brazil) M Melo (Brazil) B Soares	7	6
