= 2010 Brasil Open =

- Date: 8–14 February
- Edition: 10th
- Category: ATP World Tour 250
- Surface: Clay / outdoor
- Location: Costa do Sauípe, Brazil

Champions

Singles
- (Spain) Juan Carlos Ferrero

Doubles
- (Uruguay) Pablo Cuevas / (Spain) Marcel Granollers
- Brasil Open

The 2010 Brasil Open was a men's tennis tournament played on outdoor clay courts. It was the 10th edition of the event known as the Brasil Open, and was part of the ATP World Tour 250 series of the 2010 ATP World Tour. It took place in Costa do Sauípe, Brazil, from February 8 through February 14, 2010. First-seeded Juan Carlos Ferrero won the singles title.

== Finals ==
=== Singles ===
(Spain) Juan Carlos Ferrero defeated (Poland) Łukasz Kubot, 6–1, 6–0

- It was Ferrero's first title of the year and 13th of his career.

=== Doubles ===
(Uruguay) Pablo Cuevas / (Spain) Marcel Granollers defeated (Poland) Łukasz Kubot / (Austria) Oliver Marach, 7–5, 6–4

== ATP entrants ==
=== Seeds ===
Country	Player	Rank^{1}	Seed
ESP	Juan Carlos Ferrero	22	1
ESP	Albert Montañés	28	2
BRA	Thomaz Bellucci	35	3
RUS	Igor Andreev	42	4
ROU	Victor Hănescu	45	5
URU	Pablo Cuevas	47	6
ARG	Horacio Zeballos	51	7
FRA	Richard Gasquet	55	8^{2}

- ^{1} Rankings as of February 1, 2010.
- ^{2} Richard Gasquet was the eighth seed, but had to withdraw due a back injury.

=== Other entrants ===
The following players received wildcards into the main draw:

- (Brazil) Ricardo Hocevar
- (Brazil) Ricardo Mello
- (Brazil) Thiago Alves

The following players received entry from the qualifying draw:

- (Argentina) Carlos Berlocq
- (Brazil) Rogério Dutra da Silva
- (Portugal) Rui Machado
- (Italy) Filippo Volandri

The following player received the lucky loser spot:

- (Spain) Pablo Andújar

The following player received special exempt into the main draw:

- (Brazil) João Souza
