= 2011 Brasil Open – Singles =

Singles
- 2011 Brasil Open

Final
- Champion: (Spain) Nicolás Almagro
- Runner-up: (Ukraine) Alexandr Dolgopolov
- Score: 6–3, 7–6^{(7–3)}

Details
- Draw: 28
- Seeds: 8

Events
| Singles | Doubles |
| ← 2010 · | Brasil Open | · 2012 → |

Juan Carlos Ferrero was the defending champion; however, he chose not to defend his title due to knee and wrist injuries.
Nicolás Almagro claimed the title by defeating Alexandr Dolgopolov 6–3, 7–6^{(7–3)} in the final.

== Seeds ==
The top four seeds receive a bye into the second round.

1. (Spain) Nicolás Almagro (champion)
2. (Spain) Albert Montañés (second round)
3. (Brazil) Thomaz Bellucci (quarterfinals)
4. (Ukraine) Alexandr Dolgopolov (final)
5. (Argentina) Juan Ignacio Chela (semifinals)
6. (Spain) Tommy Robredo (second round)
7. (Italy) Potito Starace (quarterfinals)
8. (Romania) Victor Hănescu (first round)

== Draw ==
=== Key ===
- Q = Qualifier
- WC = Wild card
- LL = Lucky loser
- Alt = Alternate
- ITF = ITF entry
- PR = Protected ranking
- SR = Special ranking
- SE = Special exempt
- JE = Junior exempt
- JR = Junior Accelerator Programme entrant
- CO = College Accelerator Programme entrant
- NG = Next Gen Accelerator Program entrant
- w/o = Walkover
- r = Retired
- d = Defaulted

=== Finals ===
Semifinals
1 | (Spain) Nicolás Almagro | 1 | 6 | 6
5 | (Argentina) Juan Ignacio Chela | 6 | 2 | 4
4 | (Ukraine) Alexandr Dolgopolov | 6 | 6
(Brazil) Ricardo Mello | 2 | 1

Final
1 | (Spain) Nicolás Almagro | 6 | 7
4 | (Ukraine) Alexandr Dolgopolov | 3 | 6^{3}

=== Top half ===
First round
WC | (Brazil) J Souza | 6 | 6
WC | (Brazil) G Clézar | 3 | 2
(Portugal) R Machado | 6 | 6
Q | (Argentina) F Bagnis | 4 | 2
(Italy) F Volandri | 7 | 6
8 | (Romania) V Hănescu | 5 | 1
Q | (Brazil) A Ghem | 4 | 3
(Argentina) C Berlocq | 6 | 6
(Poland) Ł Kubot | 6^{5} | 7 | 7
(Argentina) E Schwank | 7 | 5 | 6^{2}
Q | (Brazil) R Dutra da Silva | 7 | 6^{4} | 3
5 | (Argentina) JI Chela | 6^{4} | 7 | 6

Second round
1 | (Spain) N Almagro | 6 | 6
WC | (Brazil) J Souza | 2 | 2
(Portugal) R Machado | 6 | 6
(Italy) F Volandri | 2 | 1
3 | (Brazil) T Bellucci | 6 | 7
(Argentina) C Berlocq | 4 | 5
(Poland) Ł Kubot | 6 | 5 | 3
5 | (Argentina) JI Chela | 3 | 7 | 6

Quarterfinals
1 | (Spain) N Almagro | 6 | 6
(Portugal) R Machado | 2 | 4
3 | (Brazil) T Bellucci | 1 | 2
5 | (Argentina) JI Chela | 6 | 6

Semifinals
1 | (Spain) N Almagro | 1 | 6 | 6
5 | (Argentina) JI Chela | 6 | 2 | 4

=== Bottom half ===
First round
7 | (Italy) P Starace | 6 | 5 | 6
(Uruguay) P Cuevas | 4 | 7 | 4
Q | (Argentina) L Mayer | 4 | 6 | 7
(Russia) I Andreev | 6 | 4 | 6^{2}
WC | (Brazil) F Romboli | 4 | 2
(Spain) R Ramírez Hidalgo | 6 | 6
6 | (Spain) T Robredo | 6 | 6^{4} | 6
(Italy) F Fognini | 3 | 7 | 3
(Spain) P Andújar | 6 | 6
(Spain) D Gimeno Traver | 3 | 1
(Colombia) S Giraldo | 4 | 3
(Brazil) R Mello | 6 | 6

Second round
7 | (Italy) P Starace | 6 | 7
Q | (Argentina) L Mayer | 4 | 6^{9}
(Spain) R Ramírez Hidalgo | 5 | 4
4 | (Ukraine) A Dolgopolov | 7 | 6
6 | (Spain) T Robredo | 4 | 7 | 2
(Spain) P Andújar | 6 | 5 | 6
(Brazil) R Mello | 6 | 6
2 | (Spain) A Montañés | 3 | 3

Quarterfinals
7 | (Italy) P Starace | 3 | 4
4 | (Ukraine) A Dolgopolov | 6 | 6
(Spain) P Andújar | 1 | 0
(Brazil) R Mello | 6 | 6

Semifinals
4 | (Ukraine) A Dolgopolov | 6 | 6
(Brazil) R Mello | 2 | 1
