= 2012 Brasil Open – Doubles =

Doubles
- 2012 Brasil Open

Final
- Champions: (United States) Eric Butorac (Brazil) Bruno Soares
- Runners-up: (Slovakia) Michal Mertiňák (Brazil) André Sá
- Score: 3–6, 6–4, [10–8]

Details
- Draw: 16
- Seeds: 4

Events
| Singles | Doubles |
| ← 2011 · | Brasil Open | · 2013 → |

Marcelo Melo and Bruno Soares were the defending champions but decided not to participate together.
Melo plays alongside Thomaz Bellucci, while Soares partners up with Eric Butorac. They met in the Quarterfinals, where Soares and Butorac advanced.
They went on to win the title against Michal Mertiňák and André Sá 3–6, 6–4, [10–8] in the final.

== Seeds ==
1. (United States) Eric Butorac / (Brazil) Bruno Soares (champions)
2. (Italy) Daniele Bracciali / (Italy) Potito Starace (semifinals)
3. (Colombia) Juan Sebastián Cabal / (Colombia) Robert Farah (semifinals)
4. (Slovakia) Michal Mertiňák / (Brazil) André Sá (final)

== Draw ==
=== Key ===
- Q = Qualifier
- WC = Wild card
- LL = Lucky loser
- Alt = Alternate
- ITF = ITF entry
- PR = Protected ranking
- SR = Special ranking
- SE = Special exempt
- JE = Junior exempt
- JR = Junior Accelerator Programme entrant
- CO = College Accelerator Programme entrant
- NG = Next Gen Accelerator Program entrant
- w/o = Walkover
- r = Retired
- d = Defaulted

=== Draw ===
First round
1 | (United States) E Butorac (Brazil) B Soares | 6 | 7^{7}
(Argentina) C Berlocq (Argentina) L Mayer | 3 | 6^{3}
(Spain) A Montañés (Spain) A Ramos | 3 | 2
(Brazil) T Bellucci (Brazil) M Melo | 6 | 6
3 | (Colombia) JS Cabal (Colombia) R Farah | 7^{7} | 6
(Colombia) S Giraldo (France) B Paire | 6^{4} | 1
(Portugal) R Machado (Spain) R Ramírez Hidalgo | 4 | 3
(France) J Chardy (France) G Simon | 6 | 6
WC | (Brazil) G Clezar (Brazil) C Zampieri | 4 | 3
(Spain) D Gimeno-Traver (Italy) F Volandri | 6 | 6
(Portugal) F Gil (Argentina) D Junqueira | 3 | 0
4 | (Slovakia) M Mertiňák (Brazil) A Sá | 6 | 6
(Spain) D Marrero (Spain) P Riba | 7^{7} | 5 | [9]
(Brazil) R Mello (Brazil) J Souza | 6^{3} | 7 | [11]
WC | (Brazil) R Dutra da Silva (Brazil) B Sant'anna | 4 | 4
2 | (Italy) D Bracciali (Italy) P Starace | 6 | 6

Quarterfinals
1 | (United States) E Butorac (Brazil) B Soares | 7 | 6
(Brazil) T Bellucci (Brazil) M Melo | 5 | 3
3 | (Colombia) JS Cabal (Colombia) R Farah | 7^{7} | 5 | [10]
(France) J Chardy (France) G Simon | 6^{4} | 7 | [8]
(Spain) D Gimeno-Traver (Italy) F Volandri | 2 | 1
4 | (Slovakia) M Mertiňák (Brazil) A Sá | 6 | 6
(Brazil) R Mello (Brazil) J Souza | 4 | 4
2 | (Italy) D Bracciali (Italy) P Starace | 6 | 6

Semifinals
1 | (United States) E Butorac (Brazil) B Soares | 4 | 7 | [10]
3 | (Colombia) JS Cabal (Colombia) R Farah | 6 | 6^{5} | [2]
4 | (Slovakia) M Mertiňák (Brazil) A Sá | 6 | 6
2 | (Italy) D Bracciali (Italy) P Starace | 3 | 4

Final
1 | (United States) E Butorac (Brazil) B Soares | 3 | 6 | [10]
4 | (Slovakia) M Mertiňák (Brazil) A Sá | 6 | 4 | [8]
