= 2005 Brasil Open =

- Date: 14–21 February
- Edition: 5th
- Category: International Series
- Draw: 32S / 16D
- Prize money: $355,000
- Surface: Clay / outdoor
- Location: Mata de São João, Brazil

Champions

Singles
- (Spain) Rafael Nadal

Doubles
- (Czech Republic) František Čermák / (Czech Republic) Leoš Friedl
- Brasil Open

The 2005 Brasil Open was an ATP men's tennis tournament played on outdoor clay courts in Mata de São João, Brazil that was part of the International Series tier of the 2005 ATP Tour. It was the fifth edition of the tournament and was held from 14 February to 21 February 2005. Sixth-seeded Rafael Nadal won the singles title.

== Finals ==
=== Singles ===
(Spain) Rafael Nadal defeated (Spain) Alberto Martín 6–0, 6–7^{(2–7)}, 6–1

- It was Nadal's 1st singles title of the year and the 2nd of his career.

=== Doubles ===
(Czech Republic) František Čermák / (Czech Republic) Leoš Friedl defeated (Argentina) José Acasuso / (Argentina) Ignacio González King 6–4, 6–4

- It was Čermák's 2nd title of the year and the 7th of his career. It was Friedl's 2nd title of the year and the 7th of his career.

== Singles main draw entrants ==
=== Seeds ===
Country	Player	Rank^{1}	Seed
ARG	~~Gastón Gaudio~~	Withdrew	~~1~~
CHI	Fernando González	17	2
ARG	Juan Ignacio Chela	23	3
ITA	Filippo Volandri	41	4
ESP	David Ferrer	47	5
ESP	Rafael Nadal	48	6
ARG	Mariano Zabaleta	51	7
ESP	Albert Costa	54	8
BRA	Ricardo Mello	56	9

^{1} Rankings as of 14 February 2005.

=== Other entrants ===
The following players received wildcards into the main draw:

- (Spain) Àlex Corretja
- (Brazil) André Sá
- (Brazil) Júlio Silva

The following players received entry from the qualifying draw:

- (Australia) Peter Luczak
- (Costa Rica) Juan Antonio Marín
- (Argentina) Edgardo Massa
- (Argentina) Martín Vassallo Argüello

The following player received entry as a lucky loser:

- (Spain) Guillermo García López

The following player received entry as a special exemption:

- (Argentina) Mariano Puerta

=== Withdrawals ===
Before the tournament

- (Argentina) Gastón Gaudio (Pubalgia)

=== Retirements ===
During the tournament

- (Spain) David Ferrer (Flu)
- (Spain) Óscar Hernández (Right ankle sprain)
- (Italy) Filippo Volandri (Flu)
- (Argentina) Martín Vassallo Argüello (Heat stress)

== Doubles main draw entrants ==
=== Seeds ===
Country	Player	Country	Player	Seed
ARG	Gastón Etlis	ARG	Martín Rodríguez	1
ARG	Lucas Arnold Ker	ARG	Mariano Hood	2
CZE	František Čermák	CZE	Leoš Friedl	3
ARG	Martín García	ARG	Sebastián Prieto	4

=== Other entrants ===
The following pairs received wildcards into the main draw:

- (Brazil) Marcos Daniel / (Brazil) Franco Ferreiro
- (Brazil) Henrique Mello / (Brazil) Ricardo Mello

=== Withdrawals ===
During the tournament

- (Spain) Alberto Martín (lower back pain)
