= 2018 Brasil Open =

- Date: February 26 – March 4
- Edition: 18th
- Category: ATP World Tour 250
- Draw: 28S / 16D
- Prize money: $455,565
- Surface: Clay - indoor
- Location: São Paulo, Brazil

Champions

Singles
- (Italy) Fabio Fognini

Doubles
- (Argentina) Federico Delbonis / (Argentina) Máximo González
- Brasil Open

The 2018 Brasil Open was a men's tennis tournament played on indoor clay courts. It was the 18th edition of the Brasil Open, and part of the ATP World Tour 250 series of the 2018 ATP World Tour. It took place from February 26 through March 4, 2018, in São Paulo, Brazil. Second-seeded Fabio Fognini won the singles title.

== Finals ==
=== Singles ===
- (Italy) Fabio Fognini defeated (Chile) Nicolás Jarry, 1–6, 6–1, 6–4

=== Doubles ===
- (Argentina) Federico Delbonis / (Argentina) Máximo González defeated (Netherlands) Wesley Koolhof / (New Zealand) Artem Sitak, 6–4, 6–2

== Singles main-draw entrants ==
=== Seeds ===
Country	Player	Ranking^{1}	Seed
ESP	Albert Ramos Viñolas	19	1
ITA	Fabio Fognini	21	2
URU	Pablo Cuevas	33	3
FRA	Gaël Monfils	39	4
ARG	Leonardo Mayer	49	5
ARG	Guido Pella	55	6
USA	Tennys Sandgren	60	7
ARG	Federico Delbonis	63	8

- ^{1} Rankings as of February 19, 2018.

=== Other entrants ===
The following players received wildcards into the singles main draw:

- (Brazil) Thiago Monteiro
- (France) Corentin Moutet
- (Brazil) Thiago Seyboth Wild

The following players received entry from the qualifying draw:

- (Brazil) Guilherme Clezar
- (Portugal) João Domingues
- (Austria) Sebastian Ofner
- (Argentina) Renzo Olivo

=== Withdrawals ===
Before the tournament

- (Germany) Cedrik-Marcel Stebe → replaced by (Portugal) Gastão Elias
- (Czech Republic) Jiří Veselý → replaced by (Argentina) Carlos Berlocq

== Doubles main-draw entrants ==
=== Seeds ===
Country	Player	Country	Player	Rank^{1}	Seed
URU	Pablo Cuevas	ARG	Horacio Zeballos	55	1
CHI	Hans Podlipnik Castillo	BLR	Andrei Vasilevski	97	2
ARG	Guillermo Durán	ARG	Andrés Molteni	110	3
NED	Wesley Koolhof	NZL	Artem Sitak	120	4

- ^{1} Rankings as of February 19, 2018.

=== Other entrants ===
The following pairs received wildcards into the doubles main draw:

- (Brazil) Thomaz Bellucci / (Brazil) André Sá
- (France) Dorian Descloix / (France) Gaël Monfils

The following pairs received entry as alternates:

- (Brazil) Pedro Bernardi / (Brazil) Thiago Monteiro
- (Brazil) Fabrício Neis / (Argentina) Renzo Olivo

=== Withdrawals ===
Before the tournament

- (Chile) Nicolás Jarry
- (Austria) Gerald Melzer

During the tournament

- (Uruguay) Pablo Cuevas

=== Retirements ===
- (Brazil) Fabrício Neis
