= 2012 Brasil Open =

- Date: February 13–19
- Edition: 12th
- Category: ATP World Tour 250
- Surface: Clay / outdoor
- Location: São Paulo, Brazil

Champions

Singles
- (Spain) Nicolás Almagro

Doubles
- (United States) Eric Butorac / (Brazil) Bruno Soares
- Brasil Open

The 2012 Brasil Open was a tennis tournament played on indoor clay courts. It was the 12th edition of the event known as the Brasil Open, and was part of the ATP World Tour 250 series of the 2012 ATP World Tour. It took place from February 13 through February 19, 2012, in São Paulo, Brazil for the first time, since the previous tournaments were held in Costa do Sauípe, Brazil. The competition was also moved from an outdoor event to indoors and was played at the Complexo Desportivo Constâncio Vaz Guimarães.

== Finals ==
=== Singles ===
(Spain) Nicolás Almagro defeated (Italy) Filippo Volandri, 6–3, 4–6, 6–4

- It was Almagro's 1st title of the year and 11th of his career. It was his 3rd win at the event, also winning in 2008 and 2011.

=== Doubles ===
(United States) Eric Butorac / (Brazil) Bruno Soares defeated (Slovakia) Michal Mertiňák / (Brazil) André Sá, 3–6, 6–4, [10–8]

== Singles main draw entrants ==
=== Seeds ===
Country	Player	Rank	Seed
ESP	Nicolás Almagro	11	1
FRA	Gilles Simon	12	2
ESP	Fernando Verdasco	26	3
BRA	Thomaz Bellucci	38	4
ARG	Carlos Berlocq	44	5
ESP	Juan Carlos Ferrero	48	6
ESP	Albert Montañés	52	7
ESP	Albert Ramos	66	8

- Seeds are based on Rankings as of February 6, 2012.

=== Other entrants ===
The following players received wildcards into the singles main draw:

- (Spain) Nicolás Almagro
- (Chile) Fernando González
- (Spain) Javier Martí

The following players received entry from the qualifying draw:

- (Russia) Igor Andreev
- (Chile) Paul Capdeville
- (France) Jérémy Chardy
- (Spain) Rubén Ramírez Hidalgo

=== Withdrawals ===
- (Argentina) Juan Ignacio Chela (personal reasons)
- (Spain) Tommy Robredo (adductor injury)

== Doubles main draw entrants ==
=== Seeds ===
Country	Player	Country	Player	Rank^{1}	Seed
USA	Eric Butorac	BRA	Bruno Soares	47	1
ITA	Daniele Bracciali	ITA	Potito Starace	92	2
COL	Juan Sebastián Cabal	COL	Robert Farah	97	3
SVK	Michal Mertiňák	BRA	André Sá	114	4

- Rankings are as of February 6, 2012

=== Other entrants ===
The following pairs received wildcards into the doubles main draw:

- (Brazil) Guilherme Clezar / (Brazil) Caio Zampieri
- (Brazil) Rogério Dutra da Silva / (Brazil) Bruno Sant'anna
