= 2007 Brasil Open =

- Date: 12–19 February
- Edition: 7th
- Category: International Series
- Draw: 32S / 16D
- Prize money: $456,000
- Surface: Clay / outdoor
- Location: Mata de São João, Brazil

Champions

Singles
- (Argentina) Guillermo Cañas

Doubles
- (Czech Republic) Lukáš Dlouhý / (Czech Republic) Pavel Vízner
- Brasil Open

The 2007 Brasil Open was an ATP Tour men's tennis tournament played on outdoor clay courts in Costa do Sauípe resort, Mata de São João, Brazil that was part of the International Series tier of the 2007 ATP Tour. It was the seventh edition of the tournament and was held from 12 February until 19 February 2007. Unseeded Guillermo Cañas, who entered the main draw on a wildcard, won the singles title.

== Finals ==
(Argentina) Guillermo Cañas defeated (Spain) Juan Carlos Ferrero 7–6^{(7–4)}, 6–2

- It was Cañas' only singles title of the year and the 7th and last of his career.

=== Doubles ===
(Czech Republic) Lukáš Dlouhý / (Czech Republic) Pavel Vízner defeated (Spain) Albert Montañés / (Spain) Rubén Ramírez Hidalgo 6–2, 7–6^{(7–4)}
