= 2009 Brasil Open =

- Date: 9–14 February
- Edition: 9th
- Category: World Tour 250
- Surface: Clay / outdoor
- Location: Mata de São João, Brazil

Champions

Singles
- (Spain) Tommy Robredo

Doubles
- (Spain) Marcel Granollers / (Spain) Tommy Robredo
- Brasil Open

The 2009 Brasil Open was a men's tennis tournament played on outdoor clay courts. It was the 9th edition of the Brasil Open, and was part of the ATP World Tour 250 series of the 2009 ATP Tour. It took place in Costa do Sauípe resort, Mata de São João, Brazil, from 9 February through 14 February 2009.

The singles line up was led by world No. 17 and defending champion Nicolás Almagro, Tommy Robredo and Albert Montañés. Other top seeds are 2009 Viña del Mar finalist José Acasuso, Marcel Granollers, Eduardo Schwank, Nicolas Devilder and Potito Starace.

Second-seeded Tommy Robredo won the singles title.

== Finals ==
=== Singles ===
(Spain) Tommy Robredo defeated (Brazil) Thomaz Bellucci, 6–3, 3–6, 6–4

- It was Robredo's first title of the year and 8th of his career.

=== Doubles ===
(Spain) Marcel Granollers / (Spain) Tommy Robredo defeated (Argentina) Lucas Arnold Ker / (Argentina) Juan Mónaco 6–4, 7–5

== Entrants ==
=== Seeds ===
Athlete	Nationality	Ranking*	Seeding
Nicolás Almagro	Spain	18	1
Tommy Robredo	Spain	19	2
Albert Montañés	Spain	42	3
José Acasuso	Argentina	41	4
Marcel Granollers	Spain	47	5
Eduardo Schwank	Argentina	52	6
Nicolas Devilder	France	64	7
Potito Starace	Italy	66	8

- Rankings as of February 9, 2009.

=== Other entrants ===
The following players received wildcards into the main draw:

- (Brazil) Ricardo Hocevar
- (Brazil) Flávio Saretta
- (Brazil) Thiago Alves
- (Portugal) Fred Gil (as a special exempt)
- (Uruguay) Pablo Cuevas (as a special exempt)

The following players received entry from the qualifying draw:

- (Poland) Łukasz Kubot
- (Portugal) Rui Machado
- (Brazil) Daniel Silva
- (Brazil) Caio Zampieri
