= 2014 Brasil Open – Singles =

Singles
- 2014 Brasil Open

Final
- Champion: (Argentina) Federico Delbonis
- Runner-up: (Italy) Paolo Lorenzi
- Score: 4–6, 6–3, 6–4

Details
- Draw: 28
- Seeds: 8

Events
Singles	Doubles
- Brasil Open

Federico Delbonis defeated Paolo Lorenzi in the final, 4–6, 6–3, 6–4 to win the singles tennis title at the 2014 Brasil Open.

Rafael Nadal was the reigning champion, but chose not to compete.

== Seeds ==
1. (Germany) Tommy Haas (semifinals, retired because of a right shoulder injury)
2. (Spain) Nicolás Almagro (second round)
3. (Spain) Marcel Granollers (second round)
4. (Argentina) Juan Mónaco (quarterfinals)
5. (Netherlands) Robin Haase (first round)
6. (Spain) Guillermo García López (first round)
7. (Argentina) Leonardo Mayer (first round)
8. (Colombia) Santiago Giraldo (first round)

== Draw ==
Key

- Q = Qualifier
- WC = Wild card
- LL = Lucky loser
- Alt = Alternate
- ITF = ITF entry
- PR = Protected ranking
- SR = Special ranking
- SE = Special exempt
- JE = Junior exempt
- JR = Junior Accelerator Programme entrant
- CO = College Accelerator Programme entrant
- NG = Next Gen Accelerator Program entrant
- w/o = Walkover
- r = Retired
- d = Defaulted

=== Finals ===
Semifinals
1	(Germany) Tommy Haas	3	2^{r}
(Italy) Paolo Lorenzi	6	3
WC	(Brazil) Thomaz Bellucci	4	7^{7}	4
(Argentina) Federico Delbonis	6	6^{5}	6

Final
(Italy) Paolo Lorenzi	6	3	4
(Argentina) Federico Delbonis	4	6	6

=== Top half ===
First round
(Colombia) A González	6	2	3
Q	(Italy) P Starace	4	6	6
PR	(Uruguay) P Cuevas	6^{3}	6	3
(Argentina) H Zeballos	7^{7}	3	6
(Argentina) G Pella	7^{7}	6^{3}	7^{7}
7	(Argentina) L Mayer	6^{4}	7^{7}	6^{4}
Q	(Portugal) G Elias	3	6	2
(Spain) A Ramos	6	3	6
(Italy) P Lorenzi	7	6
Q	(Spain) P Riba	5	3
Q	(Brazil) R Dutra Silva	1	7	6
6	(Spain) G García López	6	5	3

Second round
1	(Germany) T Haas	7^{7}	6
Q	(Italy) P Starace	6^{2}	3
(Argentina) H Zeballos	6	6
(Argentina) G Pella	3	4
4	(Argentina) J Mónaco	7^{7}	2	7
(Spain) A Ramos	6^{4}	6	5
(Italy) P Lorenzi	6	6
Q	(Brazil) R Dutra Silva	4	3

Quarterfinals
1	(Germany) T Haas	6	5	6
(Argentina) H Zeballos	3	7	2
4	(Argentina) J Mónaco	6^{6}	7^{7}	4
(Italy) P Lorenzi	7^{8}	6^{4}	6

Semifinals
1	(Germany) T Haas	3	2^{r}
(Italy) P Lorenzi	6	3

=== Bottom half ===
First round
8	(Colombia) S Giraldo	6	5	3
WC	(Brazil) T Bellucci	4	7	6
(Germany) J Reister	2	6	1
(Austria) A Haider-Maurer	6	4	6
(Slovakia) M Kližan	6	6
WC	(Brazil) G Clezar	4	3
5	(Netherlands) R Haase	5	4
WC	(Brazil) J Souza	7	6
(Slovenia) A Bedene	2	2
(Spain) A Montañés	6	6
(Italy) F Volandri	1	2
(Argentina) F Delbonis	6	6

Second round
WC	(Brazil) T Bellucci	7^{7}	5	6
(Austria) A Haider-Maurer	6^{4}	7	3
(Slovakia) M Kližan	6	6
3	(Spain) M Granollers	4	3
WC	(Brazil) J Souza	4	3^{r}
(Spain) A Montañés	6	2
(Argentina) F Delbonis	3	6	6
2	(Spain) N Almagro	6	3	2

Quarterfinals
WC	(Brazil) T Bellucci	6	6
(Slovakia) M Kližan	3	3
(Spain) A Montañés	4	3
(Argentina) F Delbonis	6	6

Semifinals
WC	(Brazil) T Bellucci	4	7^{7}	4
(Argentina) F Delbonis	6	6^{5}	6

== Qualifying ==
=== Seeds ===
1. (Serbia) Dušan Lajović (qualifying competition)
2. (Argentina) Diego Sebastián Schwartzman (qualifying competition)
3. (Spain) Pere Riba (qualified)
4. (Argentina) Facundo Bagnis (qualifying competition)
5. (Brazil) Rogério Dutra Silva (qualified)
6. (Italy) Potito Starace (qualified)
7. (Argentina) Máximo González (qualifying competition)
8. (Portugal) Gastão Elias (qualified)

=== Qualifiers ===
1. (Portugal) Gastão Elias
2. (Brazil) Rogério Dutra Silva
3. (Spain) Pere Riba
4. (Italy) Potito Starace

=== Qualifying draw ===
==== First qualifier ====
First round
(Brazil) Marcos Vinicius Dias	2	6	1
(Brazil) Thiago Monteiro	6	3	6
(Brazil) João Walendowsky	6	6
(Brazil) Osni Junior	3	2
(Brazil) Ricardo Hocevar	4	2
8	(Portugal) Gastão Elias	6	6

Second round
1	(Serbia) Dušan Lajović	6	7
(Brazil) Thiago Monteiro	3	5
(Brazil) João Walendowsky	0	4
8	(Portugal) Gastão Elias	6	6

Qualifying competition
1	(Serbia) Dušan Lajović	6^{5}	3
8	(Portugal) Gastão Elias	7^{7}	6

==== Second qualifier ====
First round			Second round				Qualifying competition
			2	(Argentina) Diego Sebastián Schwartzman	6	7^{7}
(Brazil) Eduardo Dischinger	4	4		(Brazil) Wilson Leite	2	6^{4}
(Brazil) Wilson Leite	6	6					2	(Argentina) Diego Sebastián Schwartzman	4	2
(Brazil) Caio Zampieri	6	6					5	(Brazil) Rogério Dutra Silva	6	6
(Brazil) Victor Hugo Portugal Pereira	1	2		(Brazil) Caio Zampieri	6^{2}	2
			5	(Brazil) Rogério Dutra Silva	7^{7}	6

==== Third qualifier ====
First round
(Brazil) Charles Costa	0	2
(Germany) Christopher Kas	6	6
WC	(Brazil) Flávio Saretta	2	2
(Austria) Philipp Oswald	6	6
(Brazil) André Ghem	4	6^{7}
7	(Argentina) Máximo González	6	7^{9}

Second round
3	(Spain) Pere Riba	4	6	6
(Germany) Christopher Kas	6	1	4
(Austria) Philipp Oswald	7^{7}	5	3
7	(Argentina) Máximo González	6^{4}	7	6

Qualifying competition
3	(Spain) Pere Riba	6	6
7	(Argentina) Máximo González	2	4

==== Fourth qualifier ====
First round
(Italy) Enrico Becuzzi	3	0
(Brazil) Alexandre Tsuchiya	6	6
(Brazil) André Sá	3	5
(Germany) Martin Emmrich	6	7
(Brazil) Idio Escobar	1	2
6	(Italy) Potito Starace	6	6

Second round
4	(Argentina) Facundo Bagnis	6	7
(Brazil) Alexandre Tsuchiya	1	5
(Germany) Martin Emmrich	4	3
6	(Italy) Potito Starace	6	6

Qualifying competition
4	(Argentina) Facundo Bagnis	2	6^{2}
6	(Italy) Potito Starace	6	7^{7}
