= 2012 Brasil Open – Singles =

Singles
- 2012 Brasil Open

Final
- Champion: (Spain) Nicolás Almagro
- Runner-up: (Italy) Filippo Volandri
- Score: 6–3, 4–6, 6–4

Details
- Draw: 28
- Seeds: 8

Events
Singles	Doubles
← 2011 ·	Brasil Open	· 2013 →

Nicolás Almagro defended his title by defeating Filippo Volandri 6–3, 4–6, 6–4 in the final.

== Seeds ==
1. (Spain) Nicolás Almagro (champion)
2. (France) Gilles Simon (second round)
3. (Spain) Fernando Verdasco (quarterfinals)
4. (Brazil) Thomaz Bellucci (semifinals)
5. (Argentina) Carlos Berlocq (quarterfinals)
6. (Spain) Juan Carlos Ferrero (first round)
7. (Spain) Albert Montañés (first round)
8. (Spain) Albert Ramos (semifinals)

== Draw ==
=== Key ===
- Q = Qualifier
- WC = Wild card
- LL = Lucky loser
- Alt = Alternate
- ITF = ITF entry
- PR = Protected ranking
- SR = Special ranking
- SE = Special exempt
- JE = Junior exempt
- JR = Junior Accelerator Programme entrant
- CO = College Accelerator Programme entrant
- NG = Next Gen Accelerator Program entrant
- w/o = Walkover
- r = Retired
- d = Defaulted

=== Finals ===
Semifinals
1/WC	(Spain) Nicolás Almagro	6	7^{7}
8	(Spain) Albert Ramos	4	6^{4}
4	(Brazil) Thomaz Bellucci	7	0	2
(Italy) Filippo Volandri	5	6	6

Final
1/WC	(Spain) Nicolás Almagro	6	4	6
(Italy) Filippo Volandri	3	6	4

=== Top half ===
First round
(Brazil) J Souza	3	3
(Romania) V Hănescu	6	6
(Italy) P Starace	5	7^{9}	6
Q	(Chile) P Capdeville	7	6^{7}	2
(France) É Prodon	4	0
5	(Argentina) C Berlocq	6	6
WC	(Spain) J Martí	6	6
(Portugal) F Gil	2	4
WC	(Chile) F González	2	3
Q	(Russia) I Andreev	6	6
(Colombia) S Giraldo	3	4
8	(Spain) A Ramos	6	6

Second round
1/WC	(Spain) N Almagro	6	6^{4}	6
(Romania) V Hănescu	3	7^{7}	3
(Italy) P Starace	6	2	3
5	(Argentina) C Berlocq	3	6	6
3	(Spain) F Verdasco	6	6^{2}	7
WC	(Spain) J Martí	4	7^{7}	5
Q	(Russia) I Andreev	6^{4}	6^{4}
8	(Spain) A Ramos	7^{7}	7^{7}

Quarterfinals
1/WC	(Spain) N Almagro	6	6
5	(Argentina) C Berlocq	3	2
3	(Spain) F Verdasco	6^{5}	3
8	(Spain) A Ramos	7^{7}	6

Semifinals
1/WC	(Spain) N Almagro	6	7^{7}
8	(Spain) A Ramos	4	6^{4}

=== Bottom half ===
First round
6	(Spain) JC Ferrero	6^{6}	2
(Argentina) L Mayer	7^{8}	6
(Slovenia) B Kavčič	4	4
Q	(France) J Chardy	6	6
(Brazil) R Mello	6	6
(Spain) P Riba	4	2
7	(Spain) A Montañés	2	3
(Italy) F Volandri	6	6
Q	(Spain) R Ramírez Hidalgo	6	1	6
(Portugal) R Machado	3	6	2
(Argentina) D Nalbandian	7^{7}	6
(France) B Paire	6^{3}	3

Second round
(Argentina) L Mayer	4	7	6
Q	(France) J Chardy	6	5	2
(Brazil) R Mello	0	6	3
4	(Brazil) T Bellucci	6	1	6
(Italy) F Volandri	6	1	6
Q	(Spain) R Ramírez Hidalgo	4	6	3
(Argentina) D Nalbandian	6	6
2	(France) G Simon	3	2

Quarterfinals
(Argentina) L Mayer	6	2	5
4	(Brazil) T Bellucci	3	6	7
(Italy) F Volandri	3	6	7
(Argentina) D Nalbandian	6	3	5

Semifinals
4	(Brazil) T Bellucci	7	0	2
(Italy) F Volandri	5	6	6

== Qualifying ==
=== Seeds ===
1. (France) Jérémy Chardy (qualified)
2. (Spain) Daniel Gimeno Traver (second round)
3. (Brazil) Rogério Dutra da Silva (first round)
4. (Argentina) Diego Junqueira (second round)
5. (Argentina) Horacio Zeballos (second round, retired due to a left elbow injury)
6. (Russia) Igor Andreev (qualified)
7. (Argentina) Máximo González (qualifying competition)
8. (Spain) Rubén Ramírez Hidalgo (qualified)

=== Qualifiers ===
1. (France) Jérémy Chardy
2. (Chile) Paul Capdeville
3. (Russia) Igor Andreev
4. (Spain) Rubén Ramírez Hidalgo

=== Draw ===
==== First qualifier ====
First round
WC	(Brazil) Bruno Sant'Anna	6	6
(Spain) David Marrero	4	1
(Brazil) Júlio Silva	2	4
(Argentina) Facundo Bagnis	6	6
WC	(Brazil) Augusto Laranja	3	2
5	(Argentina) Horacio Zeballos	6	6

Second round
1	(France) Jérémy Chardy	6	6
WC	(Brazil) Bruno Sant'Anna	0	4
(Argentina) Facundo Bagnis	4
5	(Argentina) Horacio Zeballos	0^{r}

Qualifying competition
1	(France) Jérémy Chardy	6	4	6
(Argentina) Facundo Bagnis	2	6	2

==== Second qualifier ====
First round
(Argentina) Guillermo Durán	6	4	2
(Chile) Paul Capdeville	2	6	6
(Brazil) Tiago Lopes	3	3
(Italy) Alessandro Giannessi	6	6
(Brazil) Thiago Alves	3	0
7	(Argentina) Máximo González	6	6

Second round
2	(Spain) Daniel Gimeno Traver	3	6^{3}
(Chile) Paul Capdeville	6	7^{7}
(Italy) Alessandro Giannessi	3	5
7	(Argentina) Máximo González	6	7

Qualifying competition
(Chile) Paul Capdeville	5	6	6
7	(Argentina) Máximo González	7	3	2

==== Third qualifier ====
First round
3	(Brazil) Rogério Dutra da Silva	3	6	3
(Argentina) Martín Alund	6	3	6
(Brazil) Caio Zampieri	5	4
(Argentina) Guido Pella	7	6
(Brazil) André Ghem	6	7^{7}
(Argentina) Marco Trungelliti	2	6^{2}
(Serbia) Nikola Ćirić	4	4
6	(Russia) Igor Andreev	6	6

Second round
(Argentina) Martín Alund	4	6	5
(Argentina) Guido Pella	6	2	7
(Brazil) André Ghem	1	2
6	(Russia) Igor Andreev	6	6

Qualifying competition
(Argentina) Guido Pella	5^{r}
6	(Russia) Igor Andreev	5

==== Fourth qualifier ====
First round
4	(Argentina) Diego Junqueira	6	6
(Argentina) Andrés Molteni	3	3
(Argentina) Federico Delbonis	6	6
(Montenegro) Goran Tošić	4	3
(Argentina) Pablo Galdón	7^{7}	6
WC	(Brazil) Guilherme Clézar	6^{4}	4
(Portugal) Gastão Elias	6^{4}	6^{4}
8	(Spain) Rubén Ramírez Hidalgo	7^{7}	7^{7}

Second round
4	(Argentina) Diego Junqueira	3	6	4
(Argentina) Federico Delbonis	6	3	6
(Argentina) Pablo Galdón	0	1
8	(Spain) Rubén Ramírez Hidalgo	6	6

Qualifying competition
(Argentina) Federico Delbonis	4	6^{3}
8	(Spain) Rubén Ramírez Hidalgo	6	7^{7}
