= 2011 Brasil Open =

- Date: 7–13 February
- Edition: 11th
- Category: ATP World Tour 250
- Surface: Clay / outdooor
- Location: Costa do Sauípe, Brasil

Champions

Singles
- (Spain) Nicolás Almagro

Doubles
- (Brazil) Marcelo Melo / (Brazil) Bruno Soares
- Brasil Open

The 2011 Brasil Open was a tennis tournament played on outdoor clay courts. It was the 11th edition of the event known as the Brasil Open, and was part of the ATP World Tour 250 series of the 2011 ATP World Tour. It took place in Costa do Sauípe, Brazil, from 7 February through 13 February 2011.

== Finals ==
=== Singles ===
(Spain) Nicolás Almagro defeated (Ukraine) Alexandr Dolgopolov, 6–3, 7–6^{(7–3)}

- This was Almagro's first title of the year, eighth career title, and second win at the event, also winning in 2008.

=== Doubles ===
(Brazil) Marcelo Melo / (Brazil) Bruno Soares defeated (Spain) Pablo Andújar / (Spain) Daniel Gimeno Traver, 7–6^{(7–4)}, 6–3

== ATP entrants ==
=== Seeds ===
Country	Player	Rank^{1}	Seed
ESP	Nicolás Almagro	13	1
ESP	Albert Montañés	26	2
BRA	Thomaz Bellucci	31	3
UKR	Alexandr Dolgopolov	32	4
ARG	Juan Ignacio Chela	39	5
ESP	Tommy Robredo	40	6
ITA	Potito Starace	49	7
ROU	Victor Hănescu	53	8

- ^{1} Rankings as of January 31, 2011.

=== Other entrants ===
The following players received wildcards into the main draw:

- (Brazil) Guilherme Clézar
- (Brazil) Fernando Romboli
- (Brazil) João Souza

The following players received entry from the qualifying draw:

- (Argentina) Facundo Bagnis
- (Brazil) Rogério Dutra da Silva
- (Brazil) André Ghem
- (Argentina) Leonardo Mayer
