= 2005 Brasil Open – Singles =

Singles
- 2005 Brasil Open

Final
- Champion: (Spain) Rafael Nadal
- Runner-up: (Spain) Alberto Martín
- Score: 6–0, 6–7^{(2–7)}, 6–1

Details
- Draw: 32
- Seeds: 8

Events
Singles	Doubles
- Brasil Open

Gustavo Kuerten was the defending champion, but chose not to participate that year.

Rafael Nadal won in the final 6–0, 6–7^{(2–7)}, 6–1, against Alberto Martín.

== Seeds ==
1. (Argentina) ~~Gastón Gaudio~~ (withdrew due to an athletic pubalgia)
2. (Chile) Fernando González (first round)
3. (Argentina) Juan Ignacio Chela (second round)
4. (Italy) Filippo Volandri (first round, retired because of a flu)
5. (Spain) David Ferrer (first round, retired because of a flu)
6. (Spain) Rafael Nadal (champion)
7. (Argentina) Mariano Zabaleta (quarterfinals)
8. (Spain) Albert Costa (second round)
9. (Brazil) Ricardo Mello (semifinals)

== Draw ==
Key

- Q = Qualifier
- WC = Wild card
- LL = Lucky loser
- Alt = Alternate
- ITF = ITF entry
- PR = Protected ranking
- SR = Special ranking
- SE = Special exempt
- JE = Junior exempt
- JR = Junior Accelerator Programme entrant
- CO = College Accelerator Programme entrant
- NG = Next Gen Accelerator Program entrant
- w/o = Walkover
- r = Retired
- d = Defaulted

=== Finals ===
Semifinals
9	(Brazil) Ricardo Mello	6	2	4
6	(Spain) Rafael Nadal	2	6	6
(Spain) Alberto Martín	6	6
Q	(Australia) Peter Luczak	2	3

Final
6	(Spain) Rafael Nadal	6	6^{2}	6
(Spain) Alberto Martín	0	7^{7}	1

=== Top half ===
First round
9	(Brazil) R Mello	3	6	6
(Spain) A Montañés	6	4	4
(Spain) F Mantilla	6^{1}	6	3
Q	(Argentina) M Vassallo Argüello	7^{7}	4	6
(Spain) S Ventura	4	6	6
(Spain) N Almagro	6	4	1
WC	(Spain) À Corretja	0	7
5	(Spain) D Ferrer	6	5	r
3	(Argentina) JI Chela	6	6
(Germany) L Burgsmüller	4	0
(Italy) P Starace	1	1
(Argentina) A Calleri	6	6
Q	(Costa Rica) JA Marín	3	4
(Spain) Á Calatrava	6	6
(Argentina) J Acasuso	6^{1}	3
6	(Spain) R Nadal	7^{7}	6

Second round
9	(Brazil) R Mello	6	1
Q	(Argentina) M Vassallo Argüello	3	0^{r}
(Spain) S Ventura	6	6
WC	(Spain) À Corretja	4	4
3	(Argentina) JI Chela	6^{2}	1
(Argentina) A Calleri	7^{7}	6
(Spain) Á Calatrava	3	3
6	(Spain) R Nadal	6	6

Quarterfinals
9	(Brazil) R Mello	7	6
(Spain) S Ventura	5	1
(Argentina) A Calleri	2	7^{7}	4
6	(Spain) R Nadal	6	6^{5}	6

Semifinals
9	(Brazil) R Mello	6	2	4
6	(Spain) R Nadal	2	6	6

=== Bottom half ===
First round
7	(Argentina) M Zabaleta	6	6
SE	(Argentina) M Puerta	4	2
LL	(Spain) G García López	6	6
(Argentina) J Mónaco	1	3
(Spain) D Sánchez	4	0
(France) PH Mathieu	6	6
(Spain) A Martín	7	1
4	(Italy) F Volandri	5	0^{r}
8	(Spain) A Costa	7^{7}	4	4
(Spain) Ó Hernández	6^{2}	6	4^{r}
(Brazil) F Saretta	3	1
Q	(Argentina) E Massa	6	6
WC	(Brazil) J Silva	2	4
WC	(Brazil) A Sá	6	6
Q	(Australia) P Luczak	3	6	7
2	(Chile) F González	6	3	5

Second round
7	(Argentina) M Zabaleta	6	6
LL	(Spain) G García López	2	2
(France) PH Mathieu	2	5
(Spain) A Martín	6	7
8	(Spain) A Costa	7^{7}	1	6^{7}
Q	(Argentina) E Massa	6^{3}	6	7^{9}
WC	(Brazil) A Sá	6	3	0
Q	(Australia) P Luczak	3	6	6

Quarterfinals
7	(Argentina) M Zabaleta	6^{6}	4
(Spain) A Martín	7^{8}	6
Q	(Argentina) E Massa	6	5	1
Q	(Australia) P Luczak	1	7	6

Semifinals
(Spain) A Martín	6	6
Q	(Australia) P Luczak	2	3
