= 2014 Brasil Open – Doubles =

Doubles
- 2014 Brasil Open

Final
- Champions: (Spain) Guillermo García-López (Austria) Philipp Oswald
- Runners-up: (Colombia) Juan Sebastián Cabal (Colombia) Robert Farah
- Score: 5–7, 6–4, [15–13]

Details
- Draw: 16
- Seeds: 4

Events
Singles	Doubles
- Brasil Open

Alexander Peya and Bruno Soares were the defending champions, but lost in the first round to Guillermo García-López and Philipp Oswald.
García-López and Oswald went on to win the title, defeating Juan Sebastián Cabal and Robert Farah in the final, 5–7, 6–4, [15–13].

== Seeds ==
1. (Austria) Alexander Peya / (Brazil) Bruno Soares (first round)
2. (Colombia) Juan Sebastián Cabal / (Colombia) Robert Farah (final)
3. (Germany) Andre Begemann / (Germany) Martin Emmrich (quarterfinals)
4. (Uruguay) Pablo Cuevas / (Argentina) Horacio Zeballos (quarterfinals)

== Draw ==
Key

- Q = Qualifier
- WC = Wild card
- LL = Lucky loser
- Alt = Alternate
- ITF = ITF entry
- PR = Protected ranking
- SR = Special ranking
- SE = Special exempt
- JE = Junior exempt
- JR = Junior Accelerator Programme entrant
- CO = College Accelerator Programme entrant
- NG = Next Gen Accelerator Program entrant
- w/o = Walkover
- r = Retired
- d = Defaulted

=== Draw ===
First round
1	(Austria) A Peya (Brazil) B Soares	6	4	[7]
(Spain) G García-López (Austria) P Oswald	3	6	[10]
(Argentina) M González (Argentina) J Mónaco	6^{4}	7^{9}	[10]
WC	(Brazil) G Clezar (Brazil) M Demoliner	7^{7}	6^{7}	[3]
4	(Uruguay) P Cuevas (Argentina) H Zeballos	6	6
(Czech Republic) F Čermák (Russia) M Elgin	2	3
(Spain) M Granollers (Spain) P Riba	4	6	[10]
WC	(Brazil) A Sá (Brazil) J Souza	6	3	[7]
(Colombia) S Giraldo (Colombia) A González	1	5
(Argentina) F Bagnis (Argentina) F Delbonis	6	7
(Netherlands) R Haase (Germany) C Kas	5	3
3	(Germany) A Begemann (Germany) M Emmrich	7	6
(Italy) D Bracciali (Argentina) L Mayer	7	6
(Italy) P Lorenzi (Italy) F Volandri	5	4
(United States) N Monroe (Germany) S Stadler	4	6	[6]
2	(Colombia) JS Cabal (Colombia) R Farah	6	3	[10]

Quarterfinals
(Spain) G García-López (Austria) P Oswald	7^{8}	6
(Argentina) M González (Argentina) J Mónaco	6^{6}	3
4	(Uruguay) P Cuevas (Argentina) H Zeballos	7	4	[8]
(Spain) M Granollers (Spain) P Riba	5	6	[10]
(Argentina) F Bagnis (Argentina) F Delbonis	7	7^{10}
3	(Germany) A Begemann (Germany) M Emmrich	5	6^{8}
(Italy) D Bracciali (Argentina) L Mayer	4	2
2	(Colombia) JS Cabal (Colombia) R Farah	6	6

Semifinals
(Spain) G García-López (Austria) P Oswald	7^{8}	5	[10]
(Spain) M Granollers (Spain) P Riba	6^{6}	7	[4]
(Argentina) F Bagnis (Argentina) F Delbonis	4	4
2	(Colombia) JS Cabal (Colombia) R Farah	6	6

Final
(Spain) G García-López (Austria) P Oswald	5	6	[15]
2	(Colombia) JS Cabal (Colombia) R Farah	7	4	[13]
