= 2007 Brasil Open – Singles =

Singles
- 2007 Brasil Open

Final
- Champion: (Argentina) Guillermo Cañas
- Runner-up: (Spain) Juan Carlos Ferrero
- Score: 7–6^{(7–4)}, 6–2

Details
- Draw: 32
- Seeds: 8

Events
| Singles | Doubles |
- Brasil Open

Nicolás Massú was the defending champion, but chose not to participate that year.

Guillermo Cañas won in the final 7–6^{(7–4)}, 6–2, against Juan Carlos Ferrero.

== Seeds ==
1. (Spain) Juan Carlos Ferrero (final)
2. (Argentina) Agustín Calleri (quarterfinals)
3. (Spain) Nicolás Almagro (quarterfinals)
4. (Spain) Carlos Moyá (first round)
5. (Argentina) Gastón Gaudio (first round)
6. (Argentina) Juan Ignacio Chela (semifinals)
7. (Italy) Filippo Volandri (first round)
8. (Peru) Luis Horna (withdrew)

== Draw ==
Key

- Q = Qualifier
- WC = Wild card
- LL = Lucky loser
- Alt = Alternate
- ITF = ITF entry
- PR = Protected ranking
- SR = Special ranking
- SE = Special exempt
- JE = Junior exempt
- JR = Junior Accelerator Programme entrant
- CO = College Accelerator Programme entrant
- NG = Next Gen Accelerator Program entrant
- w/o = Walkover
- r = Retired
- d = Defaulted

=== Finals ===
Semifinals
1 | (Spain) Juan Carlos Ferrero | 6 | 6
(Brazil) Flávio Saretta | 2 | 4
6 | (Argentina) Juan Ignacio Chela | 6^{6} | 1
WC | (Argentina) Guillermo Cañas | 7^{8} | 6

Final
1 | (Spain) Juan Carlos Ferrero | 6^{4} | 2
WC | (Argentina) Guillermo Cañas | 7^{7} | 6

=== Section 1 ===
First round
1 | (Spain) JC Ferrero | 6 | 6
(Argentina) S Roitman | 4 | 4
(France) N Devilder | 6 | 6
WC | (Brazil) R Dutra da Silva | 1 | 3
(France) O Patience | 4 | 3
(Argentina) M Vassallo Argüello | 6 | 6
(Italy) P Starace | 6 | 6
5 | (Argentina) G Gaudio | 4 | 3
3 | (Spain) N Almagro | 6 | 6
(Spain) F Vicente | 0 | 1
(Czech Republic) L Dlouhý | 6 | 4 | 7
(Russia) I Andreev | 1 | 6 | 5
(Brazil) F Saretta | 6 | 6
(Italy) A di Mauro | 1 | 2
WC | (Brazil) G Kuerten | 6 | 6
7 | (Italy) F Volandri | 3 | 1

Second round
1 | (Spain) JC Ferrero | 6 | 6
(France) N Devilder | 2 | 4
(Argentina) M Vassallo Argüello | 5 | 3
(Italy) P Starace | 7 | 6
3 | (Spain) N Almagro | 6 | 6
(Czech Republic) L Dlouhý | 3 | 3
(Brazil) F Saretta | 6 | 3 | 7
WC | (Brazil) G Kuerten | 2 | 6 | 5

Quarterfinals
1 | (Spain) JC Ferrero | 5 | 6 | 6
(Italy) P Starace | 7 | 2 | 2
3 | (Spain) N Almagro | 4 | 4
(Brazil) F Saretta | 6 | 6

Semifinals
1 | (Spain) JC Ferrero | 6 | 6
(Brazil) F Saretta | 2 | 4

=== Section 2 ===
First round
6 | (Argentina) JI Chela | 6 | 6
(Spain) A Martín | 4 | 2
(Spain) R Ramírez Hidalgo | 7^{7} | 6
(Italy) S Galvani | 6^{4} | 3
(Argentina) J Mónaco | 6 | 4 | 6
(Czech Republic) J Vaněk | 3 | 6 | 3
(Brazil) T Alves | 2 | 7 | 6
4 | (Spain) C Moyá | 6 | 5 | 3
Q | (Argentina) E Schwank | 2 | 2
LL | (Spain) A Portas | 6 | 6
Q | (Brazil) M Daniel | 1 | 4
WC | (Argentina) G Cañas | 6 | 6
(Spain) Montañés | 6 | 7^{8}
Q | (Spain) P Andújar | 2 | 6^{6}
Q | (Argentina) D Hartfield | 4 | 1
2 | (Argentina) A Calleri | 6 | 6

Second round
6 | (Argentina) JI Chela | 6 | 6
(Spain) R Ramírez Hidalgo | 2 | 3
(Argentina) J Mónaco | 6 | 6
(Brazil) T Alves | 2 | 3
LL | (Spain) A Portas | 4 | 0
WC | (Argentina) G Cañas | 6 | 6
(Spain) Montañés | 6 | 3 | 4
2 | (Argentina) A Calleri | 3 | 6 | 6

Quarterfinals
6 | (Argentina) JI Chela | 6 | 2 | 7
(Argentina) J Mónaco | 4 | 6 | 5
WC | (Argentina) G Cañas | 7^{7} | 6
2 | (Argentina) A Calleri | 6^{3} | 1

Semifinals
6 | (Argentina) JI Chela | 6^{6} | 1
WC | (Argentina) G Cañas | 7^{8} | 6
