= 2005 Brasil Open – Doubles =

Doubles
- 2005 Brasil Open

Final
- Champions: (Czech Republic) František Čermák (Czech Republic) Leoš Friedl
- Runners-up: (Argentina) José Acasuso (Argentina) Ignacio González King
- Score: 6–4, 6–4

Details
- Draw: 16
- Seeds: 4

Events
| Singles | Doubles |
- Brasil Open

Mariusz Fyrstenberg and Marcin Matkowski were the defending champions, but lost in the semifinals to František Čermák and Leoš Friedl.

František Čermák and Leoš Friedl won in the final 6–4, 6–4, against José Acasuso and Ignacio González King.

== Seeds ==
1. (Argentina) Gastón Etlis / (Argentina) Martín Rodríguez (quarterfinals)
2. (Argentina) Lucas Arnold / (Argentina) Mariano Hood (first round)
3. (Czech Republic) František Čermák / (Czech Republic) Leoš Friedl (champions)
4. (Argentina) Martín García / (Argentina) Sebastián Prieto (quarterfinals)

== Draw ==
Key

- Q = Qualifier
- WC = Wild card
- LL = Lucky loser
- Alt = Alternate
- ITF = ITF entry
- PR = Protected ranking
- SR = Special ranking
- SE = Special exempt
- JE = Junior exempt
- JR = Junior Accelerator Programme entrant
- CO = College Accelerator Programme entrant
- NG = Next Gen Accelerator Program entrant
- w/o = Walkover
- r = Retired
- d = Defaulted

=== Draw ===
First round
1 | (Argentina) G Etlis (Argentina) M Rodríguez | 6 | 6
(Argentina) A Calleri (Argentina) JI Chela | 3 | 2
WC | (Brazil) H Mello (Brazil) R Mello | 7^{8} | 4 | 3
(Poland) M Fyrstenberg (Poland) M Matkowski | 6^{6} | 6 | 6
3 | (Czech Republic) F Čermák (Czech Republic) L Friedl | 6 | 1 | 6
(Italy) E Artoni (Spain) Á López Morón | 2 | 6 | 4
(Spain) A Martín (Spain) D Sánchez | 7 | 6
(Spain) D Ferrer (Spain) S Ventura | 5 | 3
(Argentina) J Acasuso (Argentina) I González King | 6 | 6
(Argentina) J Mónaco (Argentina) M Zabaleta | 2 | 4
(Italy) G Galimberti (Italy) F Volandri | 2 | 3
4 | (Argentina) M García (Argentina) S Prieto | 6 | 6
WC | (Brazil) M Daniel (Brazil) F Ferreiro | 7^{7} | 4 | 7^{7}
(South Africa) J Coetzee (Netherlands) R Wassen | 6^{5} | 6 | 6^{3}
(Germany) K Braasch (Czech Republic) T Cibulec | 7^{7} | 6
2 | (Argentina) L Arnold (Argentina) M Hood | 6^{4} | 3

Quarterfinals
1 | (Argentina) G Etlis (Argentina) M Rodríguez | 6 | 1 | 6^{6}
(Poland) M Fyrstenberg (Poland) M Matkowski | 3 | 6 | 7^{8}
3 | (Czech Republic) F Čermák (Czech Republic) L Friedl | w/o
(Spain) A Martín (Spain) D Sánchez
(Argentina) J Acasuso (Argentina) I González King | 7^{7} | 5 | 7^{7}
4 | (Argentina) M García (Argentina) S Prieto | 6^{1} | 7 | 6^{1}
WC | (Brazil) M Daniel (Brazil) F Ferreiro | 3 | 6 | 6
(Germany) K Braasch (Czech Republic) T Cibulec | 6 | 4 | 1

Semifinals
(Poland) M Fyrstenberg (Poland) M Matkowski | 6 | 3 | 6^{1}
3 | (Czech Republic) F Čermák (Czech Republic) L Friedl | 3 | 6 | 7^{7}
(Argentina) J Acasuso (Argentina) I González King | 6 | 6
WC | (Brazil) M Daniel (Brazil) F Ferreiro | 2 | 4

Final
3 | (Czech Republic) F Čermák (Czech Republic) L Friedl | 6 | 6
(Argentina) J Acasuso (Argentina) I González King | 4 | 4
