= 2014 Brasil Open =

- Date: February 24 – March 2
- Edition: 14th
- Category: ATP World Tour 250
- Draw: 32S / 16D
- Prize money: $474,005
- Surface: Clay - indoor
- Location: São Paulo, Brazil

Champions

Singles
- (Argentina) Federico Delbonis

Doubles
- (Spain) Guillermo García López / (Austria) Philipp Oswald
- Brasil Open

The 2014 Brasil Open was a tennis tournament played on indoor clay courts. It was the 14th edition of the event known as the Brasil Open, and part of the ATP World Tour 250 series of the 2014 ATP World Tour. It took place from February 24 through March 2, 2014, in São Paulo, Brazil. Unseeded Federico Delbonis won the singles title.

== Finals ==
=== Singles ===
- (Argentina) Federico Delbonis defeated (Italy) Paolo Lorenzi, 4–6, 6–3, 6–4

=== Doubles ===
- (Spain) Guillermo García López / (Austria) Philipp Oswald defeated (Colombia) Juan Sebastián Cabal / (Colombia) Robert Farah, 5–7, 6–4, [15–13]

== Singles main-draw entrants ==
=== Seeds ===
Country	Player	Ranking^{1}	Seed
GER	Tommy Haas	12	1
ESP	Nicolás Almagro	18	2
ESP	Marcel Granollers	35	3
ARG	Juan Mónaco	42	4
NED	Robin Haase	44	5
ESP	Guillermo García López	53	6
ARG	Leonardo Mayer	59	7
COL	Santiago Giraldo	60	8

- ^{1} Rankings as of February 17, 2014.

=== Other entrants ===
The following players received wildcards into the main draw:

- (Brazil) Thomaz Bellucci
- (Brazil) Guilherme Clezar
- (Brazil) João Souza

The following players received entry from the qualifying draw:

- (Brazil) Rogério Dutra Silva
- (Portugal) Gastão Elias
- (Spain) Pere Riba
- (Italy) Potito Starace

=== Retirements ===
- (Germany) Tommy Haas (right shoulder injury)
- (Brazil) João Souza (abdominal pain injury)

== Doubles main-draw entrants ==
=== Seeds ===
Country	Player	Country	Player	Rank^{1}	Seed
AUT	Alexander Peya	BRA	Bruno Soares	6	1
COL	Juan Sebastián Cabal	COL	Robert Farah	89	2
GER	Andre Begemann	GER	Martin Emmrich	90	3
URU	Pablo Cuevas	ARG	Horacio Zeballos	93	4

- ^{1} Rankings are as of February 17, 2014.

=== Other entrants ===
The following pairs received wildcards into the main draw:

- (Brazil) Guilherme Clezar / (Brazil) Marcelo Demoliner
- (Brazil) André Sá / (Brazil) João Souza
