= Brazilian International Championships =

Defunct tennis tournament
- Tour: ILTF World Circuit (1932-1969)
- Founded: 1932; 94 years ago
- Abolished: 1969; 57 years ago
- Location: Rio de Janeiro; São Paulo
- Venue: Various
- Surface: Clay

Current champions
- Men's singles: (Czechoslovakia) Jan Kodeš

The Brazilian International Championships was a tennis tournament held in Brazil sporadically from 1932 to 1969.

The tournament began in 1932 and was part of a South American circuit that included the Argentina International Championships and Chile International Championships. The event petered out in the late 1950s.

Among the winners of the event were Manuel Alonso Areizaga, Don McNeill, Budge Patty, Fausto Gardini, Luis Ayala and Jan Kodeš.

Later in the open era a new successor women's tournament was revived called the WTA Brasil Open, and in 2001 the successor men's event was re-established called the ATP Brasil Open.

== Past finals ==
=== Men's singles ===
Year	Champion	Runner-up	Score
1932	(Argentina) Guillermo Robson	(Argentina) Américo Cattaruzza	4-6, 6–3, 6–3, 2–6, 6–4
1933	(Spain) Manuel Alonso Areizaga	(United Kingdom) John Olliff	6-2, 6–2, 6–0
1938	(Socialist Federal Republic of Yugoslavia) Franjo Punčec	(Socialist Federal Republic of Yugoslavia) Josip Palada	7-5, 6–3, 6–8, 6–3
1940	(United States) Don McNeill	(United States) Elwood Cooke	2-6, 8–6, 0–6, 6–1, 6–3
1941-45	No competition		
1948	(Czechoslovakia) Jaroslav Drobný	(Argentina) Enrique Morea	6-4, 6–4, 6–4
1949	(Brazil) Armando Vieira	(Brazil) Manoel Fernandes	6-2, 6–2, 6–4
1950	(Brazil) Armando Vieira	(Poland) Władysław Skonecki	7-5, 6–2, 6–2
1951	(United States) Art Larsen	(Egypt) Jaroslav Drobný	6-1, 4–6, 6–2, 6–2
1953	(United States) Budge Patty	(United States) Art Larsen	7-5, 6–1, 3–6, 7–5
1954	(Italy) Fausto Gardini	(Italy) Giuseppe Merlo	2-6, 6–4, 6–4, 6–4
1955	(Chile) Luis Ayala	(Argentina) Enrique Morea	6-3, 6–3, 8–6
1956	(Italy) Nicola Pietrangeli	(Sweden) Sven Davidson	9-7, 6–2, 6–3
1969	(Czechoslovakia) Jan Kodeš	(Czechoslovakia) Milan Holeček	4-6, 6–3, 1–6, 6–4, 6–3

== See also ==
- Category:National and multi-national tennis tournaments
