= 2010 Brasil Open – Singles =

Singles
- 2010 Brasil Open

Final
- Champion: (Spain) Juan Carlos Ferrero
- Runner-up: (Poland) Łukasz Kubot
- Score: 6–1, 6–0

Details
- Draw: 32
- Seeds: 8

Events
Singles	Doubles
- Brasil Open

Tommy Robredo was the defending champion, but he chose to compete in the 2010 ABN AMRO World Tennis Tournament instead.
Juan Carlos Ferrero won in the final 6–1, 6–0 against Łukasz Kubot.

== Seeds ==
1. (Spain) Juan Carlos Ferrero (champion)
2. (Spain) Albert Montañés (second round)
3. (Brazil) Thomaz Bellucci (quarterfinals)
4. (Russia) Igor Andreev (semifinals)
5. (Romania) Victor Hănescu (second round)
6. (Uruguay) Pablo Cuevas (quarterfinals)
7. (Argentina) Horacio Zeballos (first round, retired)
8. (France) Richard Gasquet (withdrew due to a back injury)

== Draw ==
Key

- Q = Qualifier
- WC = Wild card
- LL = Lucky loser
- Alt = Alternate
- ITF = ITF entry
- PR = Protected ranking
- SR = Special ranking
- SE = Special exempt
- JE = Junior exempt
- JR = Junior Accelerator Programme entrant
- CO = College Accelerator Programme entrant
- NG = Next Gen Accelerator Program entrant
- w/o = Walkover
- r = Retired
- d = Defaulted

=== Finals ===
Semifinals
1	(Spain) Juan Carlos Ferrero	6	6
WC	(Brazil) Ricardo Mello	4	2
4	(Russia) Igor Andreev	6	2	4
(Poland) Łukasz Kubot	2	6	6

Final
1	(Spain) Juan Carlos Ferrero	6	6
(Poland) Łukasz Kubot	1	0

=== Top half ===
First round
1	(Spain) JC Ferrero	7^{7}	6
(Argentina) E Schwank	6^{4}	3
Q	(Brazil) R Dutra da Silva	4	6	4
(Chile) N Massú	6	3	6
(Argentina) JI Chela	6^{4}	6	6
(Australia) P Luczak	7^{7}	3	4
WC	(Brazil) R Hocevar	5	3
Q	(Argentina) C Berlocq	7	6
3	(Brazil) T Bellucci	6	7
WC	(Brazil) T Alves	2	5
(Spain) S Ventura	6^{7}	1
(Spain) D Gimeno Traver	7^{9}	6
(Italy) P Lorenzi	2	5
WC	(Brazil) R Mello	6	7
SE	(Brazil) J Souza	6^{5}	4
5	(Romania) V Hănescu	7^{7}	6

Second round
1	(Spain) JC Ferrero	6	5	6
(Chile) N Massú	2	7	2
(Argentina) JI Chela	6^{5}	2
Q	(Argentina) C Berlocq	7^{7}	6
3	(Brazil) T Bellucci	6	6
(Spain) D Gimeno Traver	4	2
WC	(Brazil) R Mello	7	6
5	(Romania) V Hănescu	5	3

Quarterfinals
1	(Spain) JC Ferrero	6	6
Q	(Argentina) C Berlocq	3	2
3	(Brazil) T Bellucci	3	6^{3}
WC	(Brazil) R Mello	6	7^{7}

Semifinals
1	(Spain) JC Ferrero	6	6
WC	(Brazil) R Mello	4	2

=== Bottom half ===
First round
6	(Uruguay) P Cuevas	6	6
Q	(Italy) F Volandri	4	3
LL	(Spain) P Andújar	6^{9}	2
(Portugal) F Gil	7^{11}	6
Q	(Portugal) R Machado	6	7^{7}
(Brazil) M Daniel	3	6^{3}
(Italy) P Starace	2	2
4	(Russia) I Andreev	6	6
7	(Argentina) H Zeballos	5	0^{r}
(Spain) M Granollers	7	3
(Italy) F Fognini	6	6
(Argentina) M Vassallo Argüello	4	0
(Poland) Ł Kubot	7	7^{7}
(Spain) Ó Hernández	5	6^{2}
(Germany) S Greul	2	6^{2}
2	(Spain) A Montañés	6	7^{7}

Second round
6	(Uruguay) P Cuevas	7	4	7^{7}
(Portugal) F Gil	5	6	6^{3}
Q	(Portugal) R Machado	3	7	4
4	(Russia) I Andreev	6	5	6
(Spain) M Granollers	6	1	6^{1}
(Italy) F Fognini	0	6	7^{7}
(Poland) Ł Kubot	6	6
2	(Spain) A Montañés	2	2

Quarterfinals
6	(Uruguay) P Cuevas	1	1
4	(Russia) I Andreev	6	6
(Italy) F Fognini	3	1
(Poland) Ł Kubot	6	6

Semifinals
4	(Russia) I Andreev	6	2	4
(Poland) Ł Kubot	2	6	6

== Qualifying ==
=== Seeds ===
1. (Spain) Pere Riba (first round)
2. (Romania) Victor Crivoi (second round)
3. (Portugal) Rui Machado (qualified)
4. (Spain) Alberto Martín (second round)
5. (Argentina) Brian Dabul (first round)
6. (Spain) Rubén Ramírez Hidalgo (first round)
7. (Spain) David Marrero (first round)
8. (Brazil) Júlio Silva (first round)

=== Qualifiers ===
1. (Italy) Filippo Volandri
2. (Brazil) Rogério Dutra Silva
3. (Portugal) Rui Machado
4. (Argentina) Carlos Berlocq

=== Lucky loser ===
1. (Spain) Pablo Andújar

=== Draw ===
==== First qualifier ====
First round
1	(Spain) Pere Riba	4	4
(France) Nicolas Devilder	6	6
(Spain) Pablo Andújar	3	7^{7}	6
WC	(Sweden) Christian Lindell	6	6^{5}	2
(Portugal) Leonardo Tavares	7^{7}	6
(Brazil) Fernando Romboli	6^{3}	2
(Italy) Filippo Volandri	6	1	6
6	(Spain) Rubén Ramírez Hidalgo	4	6	2

Second round
(France) Nicolas Devilder	4	6	6^{5}
(Spain) Pablo Andújar	6	2	7^{7}
(Portugal) Leonardo Tavares	4	2
(Italy) Filippo Volandri	6	6

Qualifying competition
(Spain) Pablo Andújar	5	6^{5}
(Italy) Filippo Volandri	7	7^{7}

==== Second qualifier ====
First round
2	(Romania) Victor Crivoi	6	6
WC	(Brazil) Alexandre Schnitman	2	4
WC	(Brazil) Tiago Fernandes	2	6	2
(Portugal) Pedro Sousa	6	4	6
WC	(Brazil) Bruno Semenzato	1	0
(Brazil) Rogério Dutra Silva	6	6
(Romania) Adrian Ungur	7^{7}	6
5	(Argentina) Brian Dabul	6^{1}	2

Second round
2	(Romania) Victor Crivoi	6^{2}	7^{7}	4
(Portugal) Pedro Sousa	7^{7}	6^{5}	6
(Brazil) Rogério Dutra Silva	7^{9}	3	6
(Romania) Adrian Ungur	6^{7}	6	3

Qualifying competition
(Portugal) Pedro Sousa	6	0	4
(Brazil) Rogério Dutra Silva	4	6	6

==== Third qualifier ====
First round
3	(Portugal) Rui Machado	6	6
(Argentina) Federico Delbonis	3	3
(Brazil) André Ghem	3	7	6^{2}
(Brazil) Leonardo Kirche	6	5	7^{7}
(Argentina) Juan Pablo Brzezicki	2	6	3
(Serbia) Boris Pašanski	6	3	6
(Italy) Flavio Cipolla	6^{2}	6	6
7	(Spain) David Marrero	7^{7}	0	3

Second round
3	(Portugal) Rui Machado	3	6	7^{7}
(Brazil) Leonardo Kirche	6	2	6^{4}
(Serbia) Boris Pašanski	0	6	7^{7}
(Italy) Flavio Cipolla	6	4	6^{3}

Qualifying competition
3	(Portugal) Rui Machado	6	5
(Serbia) Boris Pašanski	1	0^{r}

==== Fourth qualifier ====
First round
4	(Spain) Alberto Martín	6	7
(Brazil) Eladio Ribeiro Neto	4	5
(Argentina) Carlos Berlocq	6	6
(Argentina) Facundo Bagnis	1	3
(Brazil) Marcelo Demoliner	4	4
(Brazil) Caio Zampieri	6	6
(Canada) Peter Polansky	6
8	(Brazil) Júlio Silva	5^{d}

Second round
4	(Spain) Alberto Martín	2	1
(Argentina) Carlos Berlocq	6	6
(Brazil) Caio Zampieri	7^{7}	6
(Canada) Peter Polansky	6^{4}	3

Qualifying competition
(Argentina) Carlos Berlocq	6	4	6
(Brazil) Caio Zampieri	3	6	3
