= 2007 Brasil Open – Doubles =

Doubles
- 2007 Brasil Open

Final
- Champions: (Czech Republic) Lukáš Dlouhý (Czech Republic) Pavel Vízner
- Runners-up: (Spain) Albert Montañés (Spain) Rubén Ramírez Hidalgo
- Score: 6–2, 7–6^{(7–4)}

Details
- Draw: 16
- Seeds: 4

Events
Singles	Doubles
- Brasil Open

Lukáš Dlouhý and Pavel Vízner were the defending champions, and won in the final 6–2, 7–6^{(7–4)}, against Albert Montañés and Rubén Ramírez Hidalgo.

== Seeds ==
1. (Czech Republic) Lukáš Dlouhý / (Czech Republic) Pavel Vízner (champions)
2. (Poland) Mariusz Fyrstenberg / (Poland) Marcin Matkowski (first round)
3. (Czech Republic) Leoš Friedl / (Germany) Michael Kohlmann (first round)
4. (Argentina) Martín García / (Argentina) Sebastián Prieto (first round)

== Draw ==
Key

- Q = Qualifier
- WC = Wild card
- LL = Lucky loser
- Alt = Alternate
- ITF = ITF entry
- PR = Protected ranking
- SR = Special ranking
- SE = Special exempt
- JE = Junior exempt
- JR = Junior Accelerator Programme entrant
- CO = College Accelerator Programme entrant
- NG = Next Gen Accelerator Program entrant
- w/o = Walkover
- r = Retired
- d = Defaulted

=== Draw ===
First round
1	(Czech Republic) L Dlouhý (Czech Republic) P Vízner	7^{7}	6
WC	(Brazil) A Ghem (Brazil) G Kuerten	6^{4}	4
(Brazil) M Melo (Brazil) A Sá	6	6
ALT	(Italy) S Galvani (Argentina) D Hartfield	3	2
3	(Czech Republic) L Friedl (Germany) M Kohlmann	6^{1}	7^{7}	[7]
(Czech Republic) T Cibulec (Czech Republic) J Vaněk	7^{7}	6^{3}	[10]
(Spain) N Almagro (Spain) M Granollers-Pujol	7^{7}	6
(Argentina) JP Guzmán (Argentina) M Vassallo Argüello	6^{5}	4
(Italy) P Starace (Spain) F Vicente	7	4	[10]
WC	(Brazil) M Daniel (Brazil) A Simoni	5	6	[7]
(Argentina) A Calleri (Argentina) J Mónaco	6	3	[10]
4	(Argentina) M García (Argentina) S Prieto	3	6	[5]
(France) N Devilder (France) O Patience	3	4
(Spain) A Martín (Spain) A Portas	6	6
(Spain) A Montañés (Spain) R Ramírez Hidalgo	6	1	[10]
2	(Poland) M Fyrstenberg (Poland) M Matkowski	4	6	[2]

Quarterfinals
1	(Czech Republic) L Dlouhý (Czech Republic) P Vízner	4	6	[10]
(Brazil) M Melo (Brazil) A Sá	6	3	[5]
(Czech Republic) T Cibulec (Czech Republic) J Vaněk	6	2	[9]
(Spain) N Almagro (Spain) M Granollers-Pujol	3	6	[11]
(Italy) P Starace (Spain) F Vicente	6^{3}	3
(Argentina) A Calleri (Argentina) J Mónaco	7^{7}	6
(Spain) A Martín (Spain) A Portas	1	3
(Spain) A Montañés (Spain) R Ramírez Hidalgo	6	6

Semifinals
1	(Czech Republic) L Dlouhý (Czech Republic) P Vízner	6^{4}	6	[10]
(Spain) N Almagro (Spain) M Granollers-Pujol	7^{7}	2	[4]
(Argentina) A Calleri (Argentina) J Mónaco	4	2
(Spain) A Montañés (Spain) R Ramírez Hidalgo	6	6

Final
1	(Czech Republic) L Dlouhý (Czech Republic) P Vízner	6	7^{7}
(Spain) A Montañés (Spain) R Ramírez Hidalgo	2	6^{4}
