= 2018 Brasil Open – Singles =

Singles
- 2018 Brasil Open

Final
- Champion: (Italy) Fabio Fognini
- Runner-up: (Chile) Nicolás Jarry
- Score: 1–6, 6–1, 6–4

Details
- Draw: 28 (4 Q / 3 WC )
- Seeds: 8

Events
Singles	Doubles
- Brasil Open

Pablo Cuevas was the three-time defending champion, but lost in the semifinals to Fabio Fognini.

Fognini went on to win the title, defeating Nicolás Jarry in the final, 1–6, 6–1, 6–4.

== Seeds ==
The top four seeds receive a bye into the second round.

1. (Spain) Albert Ramos Viñolas (quarterfinals)
2. (Italy) Fabio Fognini (champion)
3. (Uruguay) Pablo Cuevas (semifinals)
4. (France) Gaël Monfils (second round)
5. (Argentina) Leonardo Mayer (quarterfinals)
6. (Argentina) Guido Pella (second round)
7. (United States) Tennys Sandgren (first round)
8. (Argentina) Federico Delbonis (second round)

== Draw ==
Key

- Q = Qualifier
- WC = Wild card
- LL = Lucky loser
- Alt = Alternate
- ITF = ITF entry
- PR = Protected ranking
- SR = Special ranking
- SE = Special exempt
- JE = Junior exempt
- JR = Junior Accelerator Programme entrant
- CO = College Accelerator Programme entrant
- NG = Next Gen Accelerator Program entrant
- w/o = Walkover
- r = Retired
- d = Defaulted

=== Finals ===
Semifinals
(Chile) Nicolás Jarry	6^{5}	6	6
(Argentina) Horacio Zeballos	7^{7}	4	4
3	(Uruguay) Pablo Cuevas	4	2
2	(Italy) Fabio Fognini	6	6

Final
(Chile) Nicolás Jarry	6	1	4
2	(Italy) Fabio Fognini	1	6	6

=== Top half ===
First round
Q	(Brazil) G Clezar	6	1	7
WC	(Brazil) T Monteiro	3	6	5
(Chile) N Jarry	6	1	7
(Serbia) D Lajović	4	6	5
WC	(France) C Moutet	6	1	2
6	(Argentina) G Pella	4	6	6
(Brazil) T Bellucci	6^{2}	6	3
(Argentina) H Zeballos	7^{7}	3	6
(Argentina) N Kicker	7^{7}	6
(Dominican Republic) V Estrella Burgos	6^{5}	3
(Brazil) R Dutra Silva	6	6
7	(United States) T Sandgren	0	4

Second round
1	(Spain) A Ramos Viñolas	6	6
Q	(Brazil) G Clezar	3	4
(Chile) N Jarry	6^{2}	6	7^{7}
6	(Argentina) G Pella	7^{7}	4	6^{2}
4	(France) G Monfils	3	6	3
(Argentina) H Zeballos	6	3	6
(Argentina) N Kicker	4	2
(Brazil) R Dutra Silva	6	6

Quarterfinals
1	(Spain) A Ramos Viñolas	7^{8}	4	6^{3}
(Chile) N Jarry	6^{6}	6	7^{7}
(Argentina) H Zeballos	6^{3}	6	6
(Brazil) R Dutra Silva	7^{7}	2	4

Semifinals
(Chile) N Jarry	6^{5}	6	6
(Argentina) H Zeballos	7^{7}	4	4

=== Bottom half ===
First round
5	(Argentina) L Mayer	5	7^{12}	7^{7}
(Portugal) G Elias	7	6^{10}	6^{5}
(Argentina) C Berlocq	3	6	6
WC	(Brazil) T Seyboth Wild	6	3	2
Q	(Austria) S Ofner	6	6
(Italy) M Cecchinato	3	3
8	(Argentina) F Delbonis	6	6
(Spain) R Carballés Baena	4	4
(Austria) G Melzer	4	6	3
(Spain) G García López	6	3	6
Q	(Argentina) R Olivo	6	6^{6}	5
Q	(Portugal) J Domingues	2	7^{8}	7

Second round
5	(Argentina) L Mayer	7	6
(Argentina) C Berlocq	5	4
Q	(Austria) S Ofner	4	6^{4}
3	(Uruguay) P Cuevas	6	7^{7}
8	(Argentina) F Delbonis	6^{3}	6	4
(Spain) G García López	7^{7}	4	6
Q	(Portugal) J Domingues	5	1
2	(Italy) F Fognini	7	6

Quarterfinals
5	(Argentina) L Mayer	2	7^{15}	6^{5}
3	(Uruguay) P Cuevas	6	6^{13}	7^{7}
(Spain) G García López	4	2
2	(Italy) F Fognini	6	6

Semifinals
3	(Uruguay) P Cuevas	4	2
2	(Italy) F Fognini	6	6

== Qualifying ==
=== Seeds ===
1. (Austria) Sebastian Ofner (qualified)
2. (Spain) Tommy Robredo (first round)
3. (Argentina) Renzo Olivo (qualified)
4. (Portugal) João Domingues (qualified)
5. (Brazil) Guilherme Clezar (qualified)
6. (Brazil) João Souza (first round, retired)
7. (Spain) Daniel Muñoz de la Nava (first round, retired)
8. (Ecuador) Roberto Quiroz (qualifying competition)

=== Qualifiers ===
1. (Austria) Sebastian Ofner
2. (Brazil) Guilherme Clezar
3. (Argentina) Renzo Olivo
4. (Portugal) João Domingues

=== Qualifying draw ===
==== First qualifier ====
First round
1	(Austria) Sebastian Ofner	6	6
WC	(Brazil) Rafael Matos	3	4
(Argentina) Pedro Cachin	7^{7}	4
7	(Spain) Daniel Muñoz de la Nava	6^{3}	1^{r}

Qualifying competition
1	(Austria) Sebastian Ofner	4	6	6
(Argentina) Pedro Cachin	6	2	4

==== Second qualifier ====
First round
2	(Spain) Tommy Robredo	6^{5}	4
(Brazil) Pedro Sakamoto	7^{7}	6
WC	(Brazil) Fernando Yamacita	1	6^{4}
5	(Brazil) Guilherme Clezar	6	7^{7}

Qualifying competition
(Brazil) Pedro Sakamoto	2	1
5	(Brazil) Guilherme Clezar	6	6

==== Third qualifier ====
First round
3	(Argentina) Renzo Olivo	6	6
(Russia) Ivan Gakhov	4	3
(Brazil) Daniel Dutra da Silva	6	2	3
8	(Ecuador) Roberto Quiroz	4	6	6

Qualifying competition
3	(Argentina) Renzo Olivo	6	7^{7}
8	(Ecuador) Roberto Quiroz	0	6^{5}

==== Fourth qualifier ====
First round
4	(Portugal) João Domingues	6	6
(Dominican Republic) José Hernández-Fernández	2	4
(Russia) Ivan Nedelko	7^{7}	2
6	(Brazil) João Souza	6^{5}	1^{r}

Qualifying competition
4	(Portugal) João Domingues	6	6
(Russia) Ivan Nedelko	2	1
