= 2009 Brasil Open – Singles =

Singles
- 2009 Brasil Open

Final
- Champion: (Spain) Tommy Robredo
- Runner-up: (Brazil) Thomaz Bellucci
- Score: 6–3, 3–6, 6–4

Details
- Draw: 32
- Seeds: 8

Events
Singles	Doubles
- Brasil Open

Nicolás Almagro was the defending champion, but lost in the quarterfinals to Frederico Gil.

In the final, Tommy Robredo defeated Thomaz Bellucci, 6–3, 3–6, 6–4.

== Seeds ==
1. (Spain) Nicolás Almagro (quarterfinals)
2. (Spain) Tommy Robredo (champion)
3. (Spain) Albert Montañés (first round)
4. (Argentina) José Acasuso (semifinals)
5. (Spain) Marcel Granollers (second round)
6. (Argentina) Eduardo Schwank (quarterfinals)
7. (France) Nicolas Devilder (second round)
8. (Italy) Potito Starace (first round)

== Draw ==
Key

- Q = Qualifier
- WC = Wild card
- LL = Lucky loser
- Alt = Alternate
- ITF = ITF entry
- PR = Protected ranking
- SR = Special ranking
- SE = Special exempt
- JE = Junior exempt
- JR = Junior Accelerator Programme entrant
- CO = College Accelerator Programme entrant
- NG = Next Gen Accelerator Program entrant
- w/o = Walkover
- r = Retired
- d = Defaulted

=== Finals ===
Semifinals
SE	(Portugal) Fred Gil	6^{3}	6^{4}
(Brazil) Thomaz Bellucci	7^{7}	7^{7}
4	(Argentina) José Acasuso	2	1
2	(Spain) Tommy Robredo	6	6

Final
(Brazil) Thomaz Bellucci	3	6	4
2	(Spain) Tommy Robredo	6	3	6

=== Top half ===
First round
1	(Spain) N Almagro	7^{7}	7
WC	(Brazil) R Hocevar	6^{4}	5
(Argentina) M Vassallo Argüello	7^{7}	2	6
(Chile) N Massú	6^{4}	6	4
SE	(Portugal) F Gil	3	6	6
(Spain) P Andújar	6	4	3
WC	(Brazil) F Saretta	2	6	1
5	(Spain) M Granollers	6	2	6
3	(Spain) A Montañés	7^{7}	2	2
(Spain) JC Ferrero	6^{4}	6	6
(Chile) P Capdeville	1	r
(Argentina) B Dabul	6
(Spain) D Gimeno Traver	6^{6}	6	3
Q	(Poland) Ł Kubot	7^{8}	1	6
(Brazil) T Bellucci	6	6
8	(Italy) P Starace	3	4

Second round
1	(Spain) N Almagro	6	6
(Argentina) M Vassallo Argüello	4	4
SE	(Portugal) F Gil	7	3	6
5	(Spain) M Granollers	5	6	3
(Spain) JC Ferrero	6	6
(Argentina) B Dabul	1	2
Q	(Poland) Ł Kubot	7	4	4
(Brazil) T Bellucci	5	6	6

Quarterfinals
1	(Spain) N Almagro	6^{5}	6^{4}
SE	(Portugal) F Gil	7^{7}	7^{7}
(Spain) JC Ferrero	6^{5}	6	3
(Brazil) T Bellucci	7^{7}	1	6

Semifinals
SE	(Portugal) F Gil	6^{3}	6^{4}
(Brazil) T Bellucci	7^{7}	7^{7}

=== Bottom half ===
First round
6	(Argentina) E Schwank	6	7
(Argentina) D Junqueira	1	5
(Spain) I Navarro	4	1
Q	(Portugal) R Machado	6	6
SE	(Uruguay) P Cuevas	4	6	6
(Spain) Ó Hernández	6	4	1
(Argentina) J Mónaco	6^{3}	4
4	(Argentina) J Acasuso	7^{7}	6
7	(France) N Devilder	7^{7}	6
Q	(Brazil) D Silva	6^{5}	2
(Spain) A Martín	6	7
(Ecuador) N Lapentti	4	5
Q	(Brazil) C Zampieri	6	6^{5}	2
(Italy) F Fognini	0	7^{7}	6
WC	(Brazil) T Alves	4	2
2	(Spain) T Robredo	6	6

Second round
6	(Argentina) E Schwank	2	7^{7}	7^{8}
Q	(Portugal) R Machado	6	6^{4}	6^{6}
SE	(Uruguay) P Cuevas	3	2
4	(Argentina) J Acasuso	6	6
7	(France) N Devilder	2	6^{4}
(Spain) A Martín	6	7^{7}
(Italy) F Fognini	2	2
2	(Spain) T Robredo	6	6

Quarterfinals
6	(Argentina) E Schwank	4	3
4	(Argentina) J Acasuso	6	6
(Spain) A Martín	2	2
2	(Spain) T Robredo	6	6

Semifinals
4	(Argentina) J Acasuso	2	1
2	(Spain) T Robredo	6	6

== Qualifying ==
=== Seeds ===
1. (Argentina) Sergio Roitman (second round)
2. (Argentina) Leonardo Mayer (second round)
3. (Spain) Rubén Ramírez Hidalgo (qualifying competition)
4. (Spain) Santiago Ventura Bertomeu (second round)
5. (France) Olivier Patience (second round)
6. (Portugal) Rui Machado (qualified)
7. (Serbia) Boris Pašanski (second round)
8. (Spain) Daniel Muñoz de la Nava (second round)

=== Qualifiers ===
1. (Brazil) Daniel Dutra da Silva
2. (Brazil) Caio Zampieri
3. (Poland) Łukasz Kubot
4. (Portugal) Rui Machado

=== Draw ===
==== First qualifier ====
First round				Second round					Qualifying competition
				1	(Argentina) Sergio Roitman	4	1
(Spain) Miguel Ángel López Jaén	6	6			(Spain) Miguel Ángel López Jaén	6	6
(Brazil) Pedro Feitosa	1	0							(Spain) Miguel Ángel López Jaén	7	6^{6}	3
(Argentina) Mariano Puerta	6	1	1^{r}						(Brazil) Daniel Dutra da Silva	5	7^{8}	6
(Brazil) Daniel Dutra da Silva	3	6	2		(Brazil) Daniel Dutra da Silva	3	7^{7}	7^{8}
				5	(France) Olivier Patience	6	6^{5}	6^{6}

==== Second qualifier ====
First round
(Brazil) Caio Zampieri	6	6
(Brazil) André Sá	2	4
(Brazil) João Souza	4	6	7^{7}
(Brazil) Rogério Dutra Silva	6	1	6^{3}
(Brazil) Marcelo Melo	3	1
8	(Spain) Daniel Muñoz de la Nava	6	6

Second round
2	(Argentina) Leonardo Mayer	6	6^{3}	4
(Brazil) Caio Zampieri	3	7^{7}	6
(Brazil) João Souza	6	7
8	(Spain) Daniel Muñoz de la Nava	3	5

Qualifying competition
(Brazil) Caio Zampieri	3	7^{7}	7^{10}
(Brazil) João Souza	6	6^{5}	6^{8}

==== Third qualifier ====
First round
(Austria) Oliver Marach	6	6
WC	(Brazil) Thomas Jun Facchini Takemoto	1	2
(Poland) Łukasz Kubot	6	6
(Brazil) Vitor Requiao	1	2
(Italy) Gianluca Naso	3	6	2
7	(Serbia) Boris Pašanski	6	3	6

Second round
3	(Spain) Rubén Ramírez Hidalgo	6	3
(Austria) Oliver Marach	3	1^{r}
(Poland) Łukasz Kubot	6	3	6
7	(Serbia) Boris Pašanski	3	6	3

Qualifying competition
3	(Spain) Rubén Ramírez Hidalgo	6	4	3
(Poland) Łukasz Kubot	4	6	6

==== Fourth qualifier ====
First round				Second round					Qualifying competition
				4	(Spain) Santiago Ventura Bertomeu	4	6	4
WC	(Brazil) Marcelo Michelucci	1	2		(Spain) David Marrero	6	1	6
	(Spain) David Marrero	6	6							(Spain) David Marrero	4	1
(Brazil) Gabriel Dias		4	6^{5}						6	(Portugal) Rui Machado	6	6
(Brazil) José Pereira		6	7^{7}		(Brazil) José Pereira	2	2
				6	(Portugal) Rui Machado	6	6
