= 2018 Brasil Open – Doubles =

Doubles
- 2018 Brasil Open

Final
- Champions: (Argentina) Federico Delbonis (Argentina) Máximo González
- Runners-up: (Netherlands) Wesley Koolhof (New Zealand) Artem Sitak
- Score: 6–4, 6–2

Details
- Draw: 16
- Seeds: 4

Events
Singles	Doubles
- Brasil Open

Rogério Dutra Silva and André Sá were the defending champions, but chose not to participate together. Sá teamed up with Thomaz Bellucci, but lost to Federico Delbonis and Máximo González in the quarterfinals. Dutra Silva played alongside Roman Jebavý, but lost to Delbonis and González in the semifinals.

Delbonis and González went on to win the title, defeating Wesley Koolhof and Artem Sitak in the final, 6–4, 6–2.

== Seeds ==
1. (Uruguay) Pablo Cuevas / (Argentina) Horacio Zeballos (quarterfinals, withdrew)
2. (Chile) Hans Podlipnik-Castillo / (Belarus) Andrei Vasilevski (first round)
3. (Argentina) Guillermo Durán / (Argentina) Andrés Molteni (quarterfinals)
4. (Netherlands) Wesley Koolhof / (New Zealand) Artem Sitak (final)

== Draw ==
Key

- Q = Qualifier
- WC = Wild card
- LL = Lucky loser
- Alt = Alternate
- ITF = ITF entry
- PR = Protected ranking
- SR = Special ranking
- SE = Special exempt
- JE = Junior exempt
- JR = Junior Accelerator Programme entrant
- CO = College Accelerator Programme entrant
- NG = Next Gen Accelerator Program entrant
- w/o = Walkover
- r = Retired
- d = Defaulted

=== Draw ===
First round
1	(Uruguay) P Cuevas (Argentina) H Zeballos	6	6
(Peru) S Galdós (Argentina) G Pella	1	2
Alt	(Brazil) P Bernardi (Brazil) T Monteiro	3	4
(Argentina) C Berlocq (Argentina) N Kicker	6	6
4	(Netherlands) W Koolhof (New Zealand) A Sitak	6	7^{7}
(Netherlands) S Arends (Germany) A Begemann	4	6^{4}
(Spain) R Carballés Baena (Spain) G García López	6	7
WC	(France) D Descloix (France) G Monfils	2	5
(Brazil) R Dutra Silva (Czech Republic) R Jebavý	6	7^{7}
(Italy) M Cecchinato (Spain) A Ramos Viñolas	4	6^{4}
Alt	(Brazil) F Neis (Argentina) R Olivo	2	0^{r}
3	(Argentina) G Durán (Argentina) A Molteni	6	0
(Monaco) R Arneodo (Croatia) A Šančić	6^{2}	3
WC	(Brazil) T Bellucci (Brazil) A Sá	7^{7}	6
(Argentina) F Delbonis (Argentina) M González	7	4	[10]
2	(Chile) H Podlipnik-Castillo (Belarus) A Vasilevski	5	6	[5]

Quarterfinals
1	(Uruguay) P Cuevas (Argentina) H Zeballos
(Argentina) C Berlocq (Argentina) N Kicker	w/o
4	(Netherlands) W Koolhof (New Zealand) A Sitak	7	6
(Spain) R Carballés Baena (Spain) G García López	5	4
(Brazil) R Dutra Silva (Czech Republic) R Jebavý	6	6
3	(Argentina) G Durán (Argentina) A Molteni	4	3
WC	(Brazil) T Bellucci (Brazil) A Sá	6^{4}	5
(Argentina) F Delbonis (Argentina) M González	7^{7}	7

Semifinals
(Argentina) C Berlocq (Argentina) N Kicker	3	3
4	(Netherlands) W Koolhof (New Zealand) A Sitak	6	6
(Brazil) R Dutra Silva (Czech Republic) R Jebavý	5	6	[7]
(Argentina) F Delbonis (Argentina) M González	7	3	[10]

Final
4	(Netherlands) W Koolhof (New Zealand) A Sitak	4	2
(Argentina) F Delbonis (Argentina) M González	6	6
