= 2009 Brasil Open – Doubles =

Doubles
- 2009 Brasil Open

Final
- Champions: (Spain) Marcel Granollers (Spain) Tommy Robredo
- Runners-up: (Argentina) Lucas Arnold Ker (Argentina) Juan Mónaco
- Score: 6–4, 7–5

Details
- Draw: 16
- Seeds: 4

Events
Singles	Doubles
- Brasil Open

Marcelo Melo and André Sá were the defending champions, but lost in the first round to Thomaz Bellucci and Sebastián Prieto.

In the final, Marcel Granollers and Tommy Robredo defeated Lucas Arnold Ker and Juan Mónaco, 6–4, 7–5.

== Seeds ==
1. (Brazil) Marcelo Melo / (Brazil) André Sá (first round)
2. (Poland) Łukasz Kubot / (Austria) Oliver Marach (semifinals)
3. (Czech Republic) František Čermák / (Slovakia) Michal Mertiňák (first round)
4. (Spain) Marcel Granollers / (Spain) Tommy Robredo (champions)

== Draw ==
Key

- Q = Qualifier
- WC = Wild card
- LL = Lucky loser
- Alt = Alternate
- ITF = ITF entry
- PR = Protected ranking
- SR = Special ranking
- SE = Special exempt
- JE = Junior exempt
- JR = Junior Accelerator Programme entrant
- CO = College Accelerator Programme entrant
- NG = Next Gen Accelerator Program entrant
- w/o = Walkover
- r = Retired
- d = Defaulted

=== Draw ===
First round
1	(Brazil) M Melo (Brazil) A Sá	6	3	[13]
WC	(Brazil) T Bellucci (Argentina) S Prieto	3	6	[15]
WC	(Brazil) R Hocevar (Brazil) J Souza	6	3	[7]
(Argentina) L Arnold Ker (Argentina) J Mónaco	2	6	[10]
3	(Czech Republic) F Čermák (Slovakia) M Mertiňák	6^{6}	3
(Spain) Ó Hernández (Spain) A Montañés	7^{8}	6
(Italy) P Starace (Spain) S Ventura	4	3
(Ecuador) N Lapentti (Argentina) S Roitman	6	6
(Uruguay) P Cuevas (Argentina) B Dabul	3	1
(Argentina) D Junqueira (Argentina) E Schwank	6	6
(Sweden) J Brunström (Netherlands Antilles) J-J Rojer	3	5
4	(Spain) M Granollers (Spain) T Robredo	6	7
(Spain) I Navarro (Argentina) M Vassallo Argüello	6	5	[10]
(Brazil) T Alves (Brazil) B Soares	2	7	[4]
(Spain) N Almagro (Spain) R Ramírez Hidalgo	4	4
2	(Poland) Ł Kubot (Austria) O Marach	6	6

Quarterfinals
WC	(Brazil) T Bellucci (Argentina) S Prieto	4	6^{5}
(Argentina) L Arnold Ker (Argentina) J Mónaco	6	7^{7}
(Spain) Ó Hernández (Spain) A Montañés	6	6
(Ecuador) N Lapentti (Argentina) S Roitman	2	2
(Argentina) D Junqueira (Argentina) E Schwank	1	3
4	(Spain) M Granollers (Spain) T Robredo	6	6
(Spain) I Navarro (Argentina) M Vassallo Argüello	3	2
2	(Poland) Ł Kubot (Austria) O Marach	6	6

Semifinals
(Argentina) L Arnold Ker (Argentina) J Mónaco	6	6
(Spain) Ó Hernández (Spain) A Montañés	4	3
4	(Spain) M Granollers (Spain) T Robredo	6	3	[10]
2	(Poland) Ł Kubot (Austria) O Marach	3	6	[6]

Final
(Argentina) L Arnold Ker (Argentina) J Mónaco	4	5
4	(Spain) M Granollers (Spain) T Robredo	6	7
