= 2010 Brasil Open – Doubles =

Doubles
- 2010 Brasil Open

Final
- Champions: (Uruguay) Pablo Cuevas (Spain) Marcel Granollers
- Runners-up: (Poland) Łukasz Kubot (Austria) Oliver Marach
- Score: 7–5, 6–4

Details
- Draw: 16
- Seeds: 4

Events
| Singles | Doubles |
- Brasil Open

Tommy Robredo and Marcel Granollers were the defending champions. Robredo chose to compete in the 2010 ABN AMRO World Tennis Tournament instead.
Granollers partnered with Pablo Cuevas, and they won in the final 7–5, 6–4 against Łukasz Kubot and Oliver Marach.

== Seeds ==
1. (Poland) Łukasz Kubot / (Austria) Oliver Marach (final)
2. (Uruguay) Pablo Cuevas / (Spain) Marcel Granollers (champions)
3. (Brazil) Marcelo Melo / (Brazil) Bruno Soares (first round)
4. (Brazil) André Sá / (Romania) Horia Tecău (first round)

== Draw ==
Key

- Q = Qualifier
- WC = Wild card
- LL = Lucky loser
- Alt = Alternate
- ITF = ITF entry
- PR = Protected ranking
- SR = Special ranking
- SE = Special exempt
- JE = Junior exempt
- JR = Junior Accelerator Programme entrant
- CO = College Accelerator Programme entrant
- NG = Next Gen Accelerator Program entrant
- w/o = Walkover
- r = Retired
- d = Defaulted

=== Draw ===
First round
1 | (Poland) Ł Kubot (Austria) O Marach | 6 | 6
(Spain) Ó Hernández (Spain) A Montañés | 3 | 4
(Czech Republic) L Friedl (Czech Republic) D Škoch | 6 | 2 | [10]
(Italy) P Lorenzi (Italy) P Starace | 4 | 6 | [6]
3 | (Brazil) M Melo (Brazil) B Soares | 6^{5} | 6 | [6]
(Argentina) L Arnold Ker (Argentina) H Zeballos | 7^{7} | 4 | [10]
(Brazil) T Bellucci (Brazil) M Daniel | 6 | 7
WC | (Brazil) M Demoliner (Brazil) T Fernandes | 4 | 5
(Germany) S Greul (Australia) P Luczak | 7 | 2 | [11]
WC | (Brazil) F Ferreiro (Brazil) R Mello | 5 | 6 | [9]
(Argentina) JI Chela (Spain) S Ventura | 7 | 6
4 | (Brazil) A Sá (Romania) H Tecău | 5 | 1
(Russia) I Andreev (Spain) D Gimeno-Traver | 6 | 4 | [4]
(Italy) F Fognini (Portugal) F Gil | 4 | 6 | [10]
(Romania) V Hănescu (Argentina) S Prieto | 3 | 4
2 | (Uruguay) P Cuevas (Spain) M Granollers | 6 | 6

Quarterfinals
1 | (Poland) Ł Kubot (Austria) O Marach | 6 | 6
(Czech Republic) L Friedl (Czech Republic) D Škoch | 3 | 1
(Argentina) L Arnold Ker (Argentina) H Zeballos
(Brazil) T Bellucci (Brazil) M Daniel | w/o
(Germany) S Greul (Australia) P Luczak | 4 | 6 | [6]
(Argentina) JI Chela (Spain) S Ventura | 6 | 3 | [10]
(Italy) F Fognini (Portugal) F Gil | 3 | 4
2 | (Uruguay) P Cuevas (Spain) M Granollers | 6 | 6

Semifinals
1 | (Poland) Ł Kubot (Austria) O Marach | 6 | 7
(Brazil) T Bellucci (Brazil) M Daniel | 2 | 5
(Argentina) JI Chela (Spain) S Ventura | 1 | 6^{6}
2 | (Uruguay) P Cuevas (Spain) M Granollers | 6 | 7^{8}

Final
1 | (Poland) Ł Kubot (Austria) O Marach | 5 | 4
2 | (Uruguay) P Cuevas (Spain) M Granollers | 7 | 6
