= Bruno Sant'Anna =

Brazilian tennis player

- Full name: Bruno Henrique Santos Sant'Anna
- Country (sports): Brazil
- Residence: Stuttgart, Germany
- Born: 12 July 1993 (age 33) São José dos Campos, Brazil
- Height: 1.78 m (5 ft 10 in)
- Plays: Right-handed (two-handed backhand)
- Prize money: $136,958

Singles
- Career record: 0–0 (at ATP Tour level, Grand Slam level, and in Davis Cup)
- Career titles: 0; 0 Challenger, 10 Futures
- Highest ranking: No. 337 (7 October 2013)

Doubles
- Career record: 0–1 (at ATP Tour level, Grand Slam level, and in Davis Cup)
- Career titles: 0; 0 Challenger, 16 Futures
- Highest ranking: No. 313 (23 May 2016)
- Last updated on: 16 June 2021.

Bruno Henrique Santos Sant'Anna (born 12 July 1993) is a Brazilian tennis player.

Sant'Anna has a career-high ATP singles ranking of 337, achieved on 7 October 2013. He also has a career-high ATP doubles ranking of 313, achieved on 23 May 2016.

Sant'Anna made his ATP main draw debut at the 2012 Brasil Open, where he and Rogério Dutra da Silva received a wildcard into the doubles event. The pair lost in the first round to the second seeds, Daniele Bracciali and Potito Starace, 4–6, 4–6.

== ATP Challenger and ITF Futures finals ==
=== Singles: 21 (10–11) ===
Legend ATP Challenger (0–0) ITF Futures (10–11)	Finals by surface Hard (2–0) Clay (8–6) Grass (0–0) Carpet (0–0)

Result	W–L	Date	Tournament	Tier	Surface	Opponent	Score
Loss	0–1	Sep 2011	Brazil F31, Recife	Futures	Clay	(Brazil) Thiago Alves	3–6, 2–6
Win	1–1	Aug 2012	Brazil F22, São Paulo	Futures	Clay	(Brazil) Tiago Lopes	3–6, 7–5, 6–1
Win	2–1	Nov 2012	Brazil F30, Lins	Futures	Clay	(Argentina) Maximiliano Estévez	6–1, 6–1
Win	3–1	Jun 2013	Mexico F10, Quintana Roo	Futures	Hard	(Guatemala) Christopher Díaz Figueroa	6–1, 6–2
Win	4–1	Sep 2013	Brazil F9, Belém	Futures	Hard	(Brazil) Fernando Romboli	6–4, 7–5
Win	5–1	Apr 2014	Brazil F3, Itajaí	Futures	Clay	(Brazil) Daniel Dutra da Silva	7–5, 6–3
Loss	5–2	Aug 2014	Brazil F8, São José do Rio Preto	Futures	Clay	(Brazil) André Miele	2–6, 4–6
Win	6–2	May 2016	Portugal F4, Caldas da Rainha	Futures	Clay	(Portugal) João Domingues	7–6^{(7–3)}, 6–2
Loss	6–3	Jul 2016	Brazil F1, Piracicaba	Futures	Clay	(Brazil) Daniel Dutra da Silva	5–7, 3–6
Loss	6–4	Nov 2016	El Salvador F2, La Libertad	Futures	Clay	(El Salvador) Marcelo Arévalo	1–6, 2–6
Win	7–4	Dec 2016	Dominican Republic F1, Santiago de los Caballeros	Futures	Clay	(United States) Evan King	7–5, 6–3
Win	8–4	Jun 2017	Czech Republic F3, Jablonec nad Nisou	Futures	Clay	(Czech Republic) Jan Mertl	6–1, 6–4
Loss	8–5	Jul 2017	Turkey F26, Istanbul	Futures	Clay	(France) Geoffrey Blancaneaux	7–6^{(10–8)}, 4–6, 2–6
Loss	8–6	Aug 2017	Austria F6, Innsbruck	Futures	Clay	(Austria) Dennis Novak	3–6, 2–6
Loss	8–7	Jun 2018	Czech Republic F3, Most	Futures	Clay	(Czech Republic) Patrik Rikl	2–6, 6–3, 2–6
Win	9–7	Jul 2018	France F15, Troyes	Futures	Clay	(France) Fabien Reboul	6–2, 6–4
Loss	9–8	Nov 2018	Turkey F35, Antalya	Futures	Clay	(Slovenia) Nik Razboršek	4–6, 4–6
Loss	9–9	Aug 2019	M15 Wetzlar, Germany	World Tennis Tour	Clay	(Germany) Mats Rosenkranz	4–6, 3–6
Win	10–9	Sep 2019	M25 La Marsa, Tunisia	World Tennis Tour	Clay	(Germany) Louis Wessels	7–5, 6–4
Loss	10–10	Sep 2019	M25 Santa Margherita Di Pula, Italy	World Tennis Tour	Clay	(Brazil) Wilson Leite	0–3 ret.
Loss	10–11	Oct 2019	M25 Santa Margherita Di Pula, Italy	World Tennis Tour	Clay	(Italy) Giulio Zeppieri	3–6, 2–6

=== Doubles: 33 (16–17) ===
Legend ATP Challenger (0–0) ITF Futures (16–17)	Finals by surface Hard (2–1) Clay (14–16) Grass (0–0) Carpet (0–0)

Result	W–L	Date	Tournament	Tier	Surface	Partner	Opponents	Score
Win	1–0	May 2011	Brazil F12, Teresina	Futures	Clay	(Brazil) Karue Sell	(Chile) Rodrigo Perez (Chile) Juan Carlos Sáez	6–2, 6–7^{(3–7)}, [10–7]
Loss	1–1	Aug 2012	Brazil F21, São José do Rio Preto	Futures	Clay	(Brazil) Fabiano de Paula	(Argentina) Maximiliano Estévez (Brazil) José Pereira	2–6, 1–6
Loss	1–2	Aug 2013	Brazil F5, Natal	Futures	Clay	(Brazil) Eduardo Dischinger	(Brazil) João Pedro Sorgi (Brazil) André Miele	4–6, 2–6
Loss	1–3	Oct 2013	Brazil F10, São José do Rio Preto	Futures	Clay	(Brazil) Eduardo Dischinger	(Brazil) Alexandre Tsuchiya (Brazil) José Pereira	1–6, 6–7^{(1–7)}
Win	2–3	Feb 2014	Argentina F3, Villa Allende	Futures	Clay	(Brazil) Tiago Fernandes	(Argentina) Valentin Florez (Argentina) Patricio Heras	7–5, 6–1
Loss	2–4	Mar 2014	Chile F2, Concón	Futures	Clay	(Brazil) Caio Zampieri	(Chile) Jorge Aguilar (Chile) Hans Podlipnik Castillo	4–6, 7–6^{(7–5)}, [10–12]
Loss	2–5	Jun 2014	Netherlands F1, Amstelveen	Futures	Clay	(Brazil) Joao Walendowsky	(Netherlands) Boy Westerhof (Netherlands) Antal van der Duim	1–6, 5–7
Loss	2–6	Aug 2014	Argentina F13, Misiones	Futures	Clay	(Argentina) Nicolás Kicker	(Argentina) Valentin Florez (Argentina) Leandro Portmann	4–6, 2–6
Loss	2–7	Mar 2015	USA F9, Sunrise	Futures	Clay	(Brazil) Thales Turini	(Brazil) Rafael Matos (Brazil) João Menezes	5–7, 6–2, [5–10]
Loss	2–8	May 2015	Portugal F6, Pombal	Futures	Hard	(Portugal) Goncalo Falcao	(Portugal) Nuno Deus (Portugal) João Domingues	2–6, 4–6
Win	3–8	Jun 2015	Brazil F1, Itajaí	Futures	Clay	(Portugal) Daniel Dutra da Silva	(Brazil) Caio Zampieri (Brazil) Fernando Romboli	6–4, 3–6, [10–7]
Win	4–8	Jun 2015	Brazil F3, Itajaí	Futures	Clay	(Brazil) Rafael Camilo	(Brazil) Oscar Jose Gutierrez (Argentina) Eduardo Agustin Torre	6–1, 6–2
Win	5–8	Aug 2015	Italy F20, Pontedera	Futures	Clay	(Brazil) Wilson Leite	(Italy) Andrea Basso (Italy) Alessandro Ceppellini	6–4, 6–2
Win	6–8	Aug 2015	Italy F21, Bolzano	Futures	Clay	(Australia) Maverick Banes	(Italy) Omar Giacalone (Italy) Pietro Rondoni	6–3, 3–6, [10–7]
Loss	6–9	Aug 2015	Italy F22, Appiano	Futures	Clay	(Brazil) Wilson Leite	(Austria) Maximilian Neuchrist (Austria) Tristan-Samuel Weissborn	5–7, 6–4, [3–10]
Loss	6–10	Aug 2015	Poland F2, Bydgoszcz	Futures	Clay	(Brazil) Eduardo Dischinger	(Poland) Karol Drzewiecki (Poland) Maciej Smola	6–7^{(4–7)}, 7–5, [8–10]
Loss	6–11	Nov 2015	Brazil F7, Santa Maria	Futures	Clay	(Brazil) Wilson Leite	(Brazil) Franco Ferreiro (Brazil) André Miele	4–6, 6–0, [11–13]
Win	7–11	Apr 2016	Greece F5, Heraklion	Futures	Hard	(Poland) Karol Drzewiecki	(Australia) Bradley Mousley (Ukraine) Vladyslav Manafov	7–6^{(7–3)}, 2–6, [10–7]
Win	8–11	Dec 2016	Dominican Republic F1, Santiago	Futures	Clay	(Brazil) Eduardo Dischinger	(United States) Evan King (United States) Hunter Reese	6–3, 7–6^{(7–4)}
Win	9–11	Apr 2017	Portugal F6, Porto	Futures	Clay	(Portugal) Joao Monteiro	(Spain) Roberto Ortega Olmedo (Spain) David Vega Hernández	4–6, 6–3, [10–8]
Win	10–11	Jul 2017	Italy F19, Basilicanova	Futures	Clay	(Brazil) Wilson Leite	(Austria) Lenny Hampel (Switzerland) Marc-Andrea Hüsler	7–5, 6–4
Loss	10–12	Jul 2017	Italy F20, Albinea	Futures	Clay	(Brazil) Wilson Leite	(Italy) Jacopo Stefanini (Italy) Omar Giacalone	7–5, 1–6, [5–10]
Win	11–12	Jul 2017	Italy F21, Casinalbo	Futures	Clay	(Argentina) Federico Coria	(Italy) Enrico Dalla Valle (Italy) Andrea Pellegrino	6–3, 4–6, [10–8]
Win	12–12	Dec 2017	Mexico F8, Cancún	Futures	Hard	(Ecuador) Gonzalo Escobar	(Bolivia) Boris Arias (Bolivia) Federico Zeballos	1–6, 6–3, [10–4]
Loss	12–13	Feb 2018	Spain F3, Mallorca	Futures	Clay	(Spain) David Vega Hernández	(South Korea) Yunseong Chung (Japan) Rio Noguchi	6–2, 6–7^{(6–8)}, [8–10]
Loss	12–14	Feb 2018	Spain F5, Murcia	Futures	Clay	(Italy) Dante Gennaro	(Spain) Mario Vilella Martínez (Brazil) Eduardo Russi	6–3, 3–6, [8–10]
Win	13–14	Mar 2018	Croatia F2, Poreč	Futures	Clay	(Ecuador) Gonzalo Escobar	(Croatia) Matej Sabanov (Croatia) Ivan Sabanov	6–4, 5–7, [11–9]
Win	14–14	Mar 2018	Croatia F3, Opatija	Futures	Clay	(Argentina) Tomás Lipovšek Puches	(Montenegro) Ljubomir Čelebić (Hungary) Péter Nagy	6–4, 6–1
Win	15–14	Jul 2018	France F15, Troyes	Futures	Clay	(Germany) David Klier	(France) Dan Added (France) Hugo Voljacques	6–2, 6–2
Loss	15–15	Aug 2018	Italy F21, Bolzano	Futures	Clay	(Brazil) Wilson Leite	(Ecuador) Gonzalo Escobar (Argentina) Hernán Casanova	5–7, 2–6
Loss	15–16	Sep 2018	Italy F29, Santa Margherita Di Pula	Futures	Clay	(Italy) Davide Galoppini	(Germany) Florian Fallert (Switzerland) Sandro Ehrat	6–7^{(3–7)}, 3–6
Win	16–16	Nov 2018	Turkey F35, Antalya	Futures	Clay	(Brazil) Wilson Leite	(Spain) Javier Barranco Cosano (Spain) Jaume Pla Malfeito	6–4, 6–4
Loss	16–17	Mar 2019	M25 Tabarka, Tunisia	World Tennis Tour	Clay	(Brazil) Wilson Leite	(Spain) Sergio Martos Gornés (Spain) Oriol Roca Batalla	2–6, 2–6
