= Brasil Open =

Coordinates: 23.578°S 46.656°W

Defunct tennis tournament
- Founded: 2001
- Abolished: 2019
- Editions: 19
- Location: São Paulo (2012–2019); Mata de São João (2001–2011); Brazil
- Venue: Ginásio do Ibirapuera (2012–2015, 2018–2019); Esporte Clube Pinheiros (2016–2017); Costa do Sauípe (2001–2011)
- Category: ATP International Series (2001–2008); ATP Tour 250 (2009–2019)
- Surface: Hard (2001–2003); Clay (2004–2011, 2016–2017); Clay (i) (2012–2015, 2018–2019)
- Website: brasilopen.com.br

The Brasil Open was a men's tennis tournament also known as the ATP Brasil Open. It was held annually in São Paulo, Brazil from 2001 until 2019 and was the successor event to the earlier Brazilian International Championships (1932–1969).

It was part of the ATP Tour 250 series, and was one of the main events in the Brazilian tennis calendar alongside ATP Tour 500 Rio Open. Since 2004, it was a part of the South American clay court circuit but was held on hardcourts prior to 2004. Nicolás Almagro and Pablo Cuevas hold the record for most singles titles with three each, while in doubles the record is held by Bruno Soares with three consecutive titles from 2011 to 2013. On 15 October 2019, tournament organisers announced that the tournament was being scrapped in favour of a return to the Chile Open.

== Past finals ==
=== Singles ===
Location	Year	Champions	Runners-up	Score
Costa do Sauípe	2001	(Czech Republic) Jan Vacek	(Brazil) Fernando Meligeni	2–6, 7–6^{(7–2)}, 6–3
Costa do Sauípe	2002	(Brazil) Gustavo Kuerten	(Argentina) Guillermo Coria	6–7^{(4–7)}, 7–5, 7–6^{(7–2)}
Costa do Sauípe	2003	(Netherlands) Sjeng Schalken	(Germany) Rainer Schüttler	6–2, 6–4
Costa do Sauípe	2004	(Brazil) Gustavo Kuerten (2)	(Argentina) Agustín Calleri	3–6, 6–2, 6–3
Costa do Sauípe	2005	(Spain) Rafael Nadal	(Spain) Alberto Martín	6–0, 6–7^{(2–7)}, 6–1
Costa do Sauípe	2006	(Chile) Nicolás Massú	(Spain) Alberto Martín	6–3, 6–4
Costa do Sauípe	2007	(Argentina) Guillermo Cañas	(Spain) Juan Carlos Ferrero	7–6^{(7–4)}, 6–2
Costa do Sauípe	2008	(Spain) Nicolás Almagro	(Spain) Carlos Moyá	7–6^{(7–4)}, 3–6, 7–5
Costa do Sauípe	2009	(Spain) Tommy Robredo	(Brazil) Thomaz Bellucci	6–3, 3–6, 6–4
Costa do Sauípe	2010	(Spain) Juan Carlos Ferrero	(Poland) Łukasz Kubot	6–1, 6–0
Costa do Sauípe	2011	(Spain) Nicolás Almagro (2)	(Ukraine) Alexandr Dolgopolov	6–3, 7–6^{(7–3)}
São Paulo	2012	(Spain) Nicolás Almagro (3)	(Italy) Filippo Volandri	6–3, 4–6, 6–4
São Paulo	2013	(Spain) Rafael Nadal (2)	(Argentina) David Nalbandian	6–2, 6–3
São Paulo	2014	(Argentina) Federico Delbonis	(Italy) Paolo Lorenzi	4–6, 6–3, 6–4
São Paulo	2015	(Uruguay) Pablo Cuevas	(Italy) Luca Vanni	6–4, 3–6, 7–6^{(7–4)}
São Paulo	2016	(Uruguay) Pablo Cuevas (2)	(Spain) Pablo Carreño Busta	7–6^{(7–4)}, 6–3
São Paulo	2017	(Uruguay) Pablo Cuevas (3)	(Spain) Albert Ramos Viñolas	6–7^{(3–7)}, 6–4, 6–4
São Paulo	2018	(Italy) Fabio Fognini	(Chile) Nicolás Jarry	1–6, 6–1, 6–4
São Paulo	2019	(Argentina) Guido Pella	(Chile) Cristian Garín	7–5, 6–3
São Paulo	2020	replaced by Chile Open		

=== Doubles ===
Location	Year	Champions	Runners-up	Score
Costa do Sauípe	2001	(Argentina) Enzo Artoni (Brazil) Daniel Melo	(Argentina) Gastón Etlis (South Africa) Brent Haygarth	6–3, 1–6, 7–6^{(7–5)}
Costa do Sauípe	2002	(United States) Scott Humphries (The Bahamas) Mark Merklein	(Brazil) Gustavo Kuerten (Brazil) André Sá	6–3, 7–6^{(7–1)}
Costa do Sauípe	2003	(Australia) Todd Perry (Japan) Thomas Shimada	(United States) Scott Humphries (The Bahamas) Mark Merklein	6–2, 6–4
Costa do Sauípe	2004	(Poland) Mariusz Fyrstenberg (Poland) Marcin Matkowski	(Germany) Tomas Behrend (Czech Republic) Leoš Friedl	6–2, 6–2
Costa do Sauípe	2005	(Czech Republic) František Čermák (Czech Republic) Leoš Friedl	(Argentina) José Acasuso (Argentina) Ignacio González King	6–4, 6–4
Costa do Sauípe	2006	(Czech Republic) Lukáš Dlouhý (Czech Republic) Pavel Vízner	(Poland) Mariusz Fyrstenberg (Poland) Marcin Matkowski	6–1, 4–6, [10–3]
Costa do Sauípe	2007	(Czech Republic) Lukáš Dlouhý (2) (Czech Republic) Pavel Vízner (2)	(Spain) Rubén Ramírez Hidalgo (Spain) Albert Montañés	6–2, 7–6^{(7–4)}
Costa do Sauípe	2008	(Brazil) Marcelo Melo (Brazil) André Sá	(Spain) Albert Montañés (Spain) Santiago Ventura	4–6, 6–2, [10–7]
Costa do Sauípe	2009	(Spain) Marcel Granollers (Spain) Tommy Robredo	(Argentina) Lucas Arnold Ker (Argentina) Juan Mónaco	6–4, 7–5
Costa do Sauípe	2010	(Uruguay) Pablo Cuevas (Spain) Marcel Granollers (2)	(Poland) Łukasz Kubot (Austria) Oliver Marach	7–5, 6–4
Costa do Sauípe	2011	(Brazil) Marcelo Melo (2) (Brazil) Bruno Soares	(Spain) Pablo Andújar (Spain) Daniel Gimeno-Traver	7–6^{(7–4)}, 6–3
São Paulo	2012	(United States) Eric Butorac (Brazil) Bruno Soares (2)	(Slovakia) Michal Mertiňák (Brazil) André Sá	3–6, 6–4, [10–8]
São Paulo	2013	(Austria) Alexander Peya (Brazil) Bruno Soares (3)	(Czech Republic) František Čermák (Slovakia) Michal Mertiňák	6–7^{(5–7)}, 6–2, [10–7]
São Paulo	2014	(Spain) Guillermo García-López (Austria) Philipp Oswald	(Colombia) Juan Sebastián Cabal (Colombia) Robert Farah	5–7, 6–4, [15–13]
São Paulo	2015	(Colombia) Juan Sebastián Cabal (Colombia) Robert Farah	(Italy) Paolo Lorenzi (Argentina) Diego Schwartzman	6–4, 6–2
São Paulo	2016	(Chile) Julio Peralta (Argentina) Horacio Zeballos	(Spain) Pablo Carreño Busta (Spain) David Marrero	4–6, 6–1, [10–5]
São Paulo	2017	(Brazil) Rogério Dutra Silva (Brazil) André Sá	(New Zealand) Marcus Daniell (Brazil) Marcelo Demoliner	7–6^{(7–5)}, 5–7, [10–7]
São Paulo	2018	(Argentina) Federico Delbonis (Argentina) Máximo González	(Netherlands) Wesley Koolhof (New Zealand) Artem Sitak	6–4, 6–2
São Paulo	2019	(Argentina) Federico Delbonis (2) (Argentina) Máximo González (2)	(United Kingdom) Luke Bambridge (United Kingdom) Jonny O'Mara	6–4, 6–3

== See also ==
- Brazil International Championships
- ATP São Paulo
- São Paulo WCT
- São Paulo Challenger de Tênis
- WTA Brasil Open
