= Filippo Volandri =

Italian tennis player

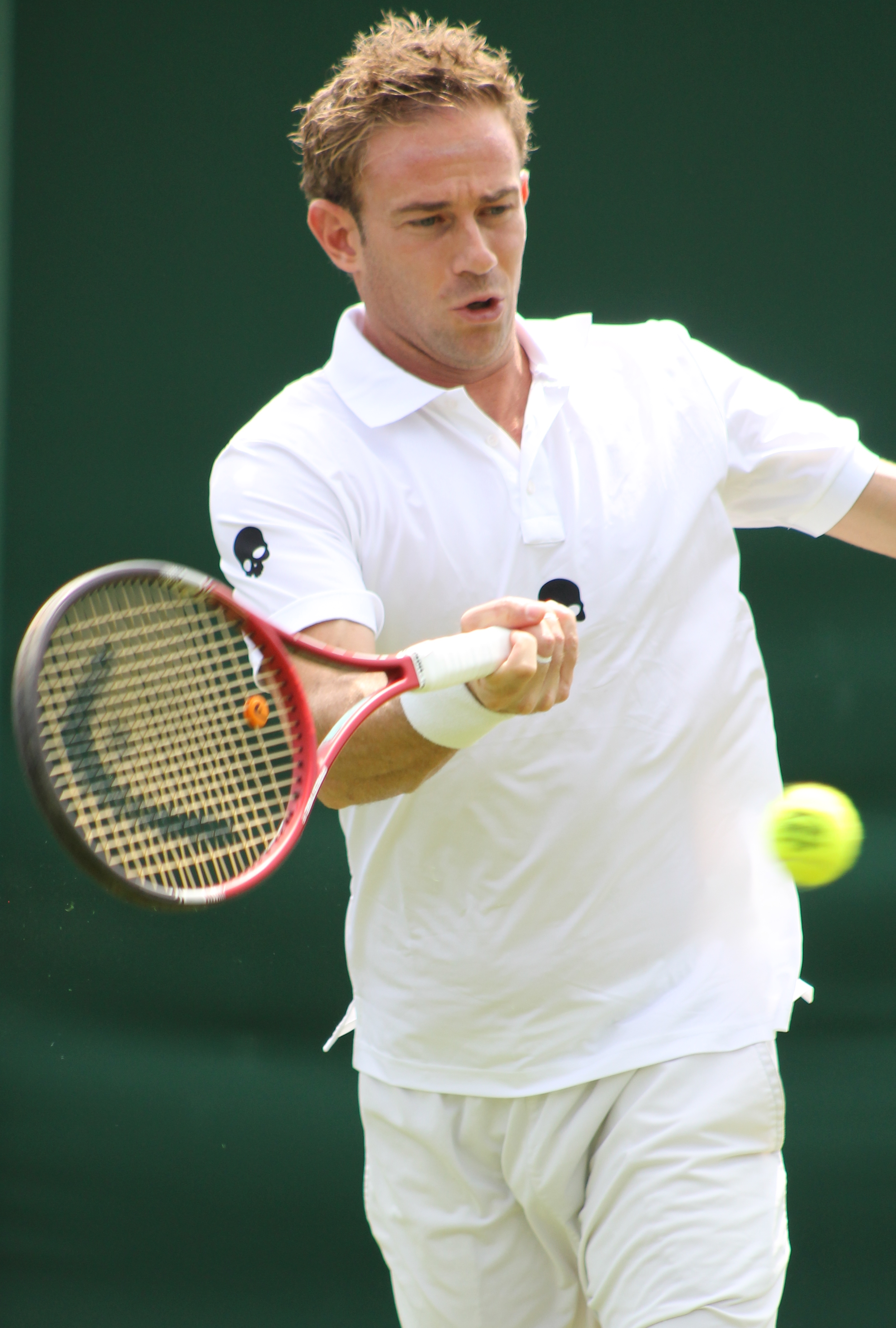
- Volandri at 2014 Wimbledon
- Country (sports): Italy
- Residence: Livorno
- Born: 5 September 1981 (age 44) Livorno, Tuscany, Italy
- Height: 1.83 m (6 ft 0 in)
- Turned pro: 1997
- Retired: 2016
- Plays: Right-handed (one-handed backhand)
- Prize money: $3,949,631

Singles
- Career record: 178–224
- Career titles: 2
- Highest ranking: No. 25 (23 July 2007)

Grand Slam singles results
- Australian Open: 2R (2004)
- French Open: 4R (2007)
- Wimbledon: 2R (2004)
- US Open: 2R (2004)

Other tournaments
- Olympic Games: 1R (2004)

Doubles
- Career record: 32–76
- Career titles: 0
- Highest ranking: No. 120 (14 May 2006)

Grand Slam doubles results
- Australian Open: 2R (2005)
- French Open: 2R (2005, 2007, 2011, 2012)
- Wimbledon: 1R (2004, 2005)
- US Open: 2R (2003, 2005)
- Last updated on: 31 July 2017.

Filippo Volandri (Italian pronunciation: [fiˈlippo voˈlandri]; born 5 September 1981) is an Italian tennis coach and former professional player. Volandri reached a career-high singles ranking of world no. 25 in July 2007. He turned professional in 1997 and earned almost $4 million in prize money, winning two ATP titles (out of nine finals in total). His biggest victory was defeating Roger Federer, world number 1, at 2007 Italian Open – Men's singles. Retired in 2017, the following year he became coach and since 2021 he has been the captain of the Italian team, which he led to the win of three consecutive Davis Cups in 2023, 2024 and 2025, establishing a new international record.

== Earlier career ==
=== 2006: Second title ===
Volandri won the second title of his career in September 2006, beating Nicolás Lapentti in the final of the Sicily International.

=== 2007: Success at the Rome Masters and French Open ===
At the Rome Masters in 2007 Volandri, having entered as a wild card, recorded the biggest win of his career by beating the then world no. 1 Roger Federer in straight sets 6–2, 6–4. Volandri celebrated by doing a lap of honour around centre court, high-fiving spectators in the front rows.

Volandri hailed the victory as not only for himself, but for Italy, speaking of both the regard in which Federer, who holds the record for the longest streak as the world's top-ranked male player, is held, and the relative under-achievement of Italy in men's tennis at the time. For his part Federer offered few excuses for his out-of-character display. Hopes that this might be the start of Italy's re-emergence among the top nations of professional men's tennis were heightened when Volandri went on to beat world no. 12 Tomáš Berdych in the quarterfinal. The win meant that Volandri became the first Italian to reach the event's semifinals since 1978. His run stopped in the semifinals when he lost to Fernando González.

At the 2007 French Open he was the 29th seed and made it to the fourth round, rising to No. 27 in the world in the rankings.

== Later career ==
Volandri struggled greatly after the dropped match-fixing allegations. In 2012, he reached the final of the Brasil Open. He mainly competed on the ATP Challenger Tour.

On 23 June 2015, Volandri completed 300 wins at the ATP Challenger Tour tournaments by defeating Oriol Roca Batalla at the Aspria Tennis Cup in Milan. He became only the fourth player with this achievement.

== Controversy ==
Volandri came under suspicion for betting and match fixing, and his name featured prominently in a list compiled by the ATP of matches under suspicion for corruption.

In January 2009, Volandri received a three-month ban from the ATP for a doping offence after testing positive for salbutamol during the Indian Wells tournament. Volandri had a medical exemption from the International Tennis Federation to use salbutamol, an asthma medication, but the ITF deemed that his use of the drug was beyond therapeutic needs. His suspension was to last until 14 April 2009 and required him to forfeit all prize money and ranking points earned from the date of the failed test until the beginning of his suspension.

In March 2009, the Court of Arbitration for Sport overruled the ATP decision and ruled that Volandri should be reinstated and that his forfeited ranking points and earnings returned to him. Volandri stated that he intended to sue the ATP over the incident.

== ATP career finals ==
=== Singles: 9 (2 titles, 7 runner-ups) ===
| Legend Grand Slam tournaments (0–0) ATP World Tour Finals (0–0) ATP World Tour Masters 1000 (0–0) ATP World Tour 500 Series (0–0) ATP World Tour 250 Series (2–7) | Titles by surface Hard (0–0) Clay (2–7) Grass (0–0) | Titles by setting Outdoor (2–7) Indoor (0–0) |

| Result | W–L | Date | Tournament | Tier | Surface | Opponent | Score |
|---|---|---|---|---|---|---|---|
| Loss | 0–1 | Jul 2003 | Croatia Open, Croatia | International | Clay | (Spain) Carlos Moyá | 4–6, 6–3, 5–7 |
| Win | 1–1 | May 2004 | St. Pölten International, Austria | International | Clay | (Belgium) Xavier Malisse | 6–1, 6–4 |
| Loss | 1–2 | Jul 2004 | Croatia Open, Croatia | International | Clay | (Argentina) Guillermo Cañas | 5–7, 3–6 |
| Loss | 1–3 | Oct 2004 | Campionati Internazionali di Sicilia, Italy | International | Clay | (Czech Republic) Tomáš Berdych | 3–6, 3–6 |
| Loss | 1–4 | Oct 2005 | Campionati Internazionali di Sicilia, Italy | International | Clay | (Russia) Igor Andreev | 6–0, 1–6, 3–6 |
| Loss | 1–5 | Feb 2006 | Argentina Open, Argentina | International | Clay | (Spain) Carlos Moyà | 6–7^{(6–8)}, 4–6 |
| Loss | 1–6 | Sep 2006 | Romanian Open, Romania | International | Clay | (Austria) Jürgen Melzer | 1–6, 5–7 |
| Win | 2–6 | Oct 2006 | Campionati Internazionali di Sicilia, Italy | International | Clay | (Ecuador) Nicolás Lapentti | 5–7, 6–1, 6–3 |
| Loss | 2–7 | Feb 2012 | Brasil Open, Brazil | ATP World Tour 250 | Clay | (Spain) Nicolás Almagro | 3–6, 6–4, 4–6 |

=== Doubles: 1 (1 runner-up) ===
| Legend Grand Slam tournaments (0–0) ATP World Tour Finals (0–0) ATP World Tour Masters 1000 (0–0) ATP World Tour 500 Series (0–0) ATP World Tour 250 Series (0–1) | Titles by surface Hard (0–0) Clay (0–1) Grass (0–0) | Titles by setting Outdoor (0–1) Indoor (0–0) |

| Result | W–L | Date | Tournament | Tier | Surface | Partner | Opponents | Score |
|---|---|---|---|---|---|---|---|---|
| Loss | 0–1 | Mar 2006 | Mexican Open, Mexico | International | Clay | (Italy) Potito Starace | (Czech Republic) František Čermák (Czech Republic) Leoš Friedl | 5–7, 2–6 |

== ATP Challengers ==
Legend
ATP Challenger Tour Finals (1–0)
ATP Challenger Tour (11–14)

| Outcome | No. | Date | Tournament | Surface | Opponent | Score |
|---|---|---|---|---|---|---|
| Runner-up | 1. | 7 August 2000 | Prague, Czech Republic | Clay | (Spain) Albert Montañés | 1–6, 1–6 |
| Winner | 1. | 18 September 2000 | Biella, Italy | Clay | (Argentina) Hernán Gumy | 6–3, 6–2 |
| Runner-up | 2. | 29 April 2002 | Rome, Italy | Clay | (Argentina) Martín Vassallo Argüello | 4–6, 0–6 |
| Runner-up | 3. | 12 August 2002 | Graz, Austria | Hard | (France) Olivier Mutis | 3–6, 2–6 |
| Winner | 2. | 17 March 2003 | Cagliari, Italy | Clay | (Spain) Rafael Nadal | 2–6, 6–2, 6–1 |
| Winner | 3. | 9 June 2003 | Biella, Italy | Clay | (Argentina) José Acasuso | 2–6, 7–6^{(7–4)}, 6–4 |
| Winner | 4. | 2 August 2004 | Trani, Italy | Clay | (Italy) Francesco Aldi | 6–1, 6–3 |
| Winner | 5. | 21 July 2008 | San Marino | Clay | (Italy) Potito Starace | 5–7, 6–4, 6–1 |
| Winner | 6. | 28 July 2008 | Cordenons, Italy | Clay | (Spain) Óscar Hernández | 6–3, 7–5 |
| Runner-up | 4. | 17 August 2009 | Trani, Italy | Clay | (Austria) Daniel Köllerer | 3–6, 5–7 |
| Winner | 7. | 12 April 2010 | Rome, Italy | Clay | (Algeria) Lamine Ouahab | 6–4, 7–5 |
| Winner | 8. | 31 May 2010 | Rome, Italy | Clay | (Morocco) Reda El Amrani | 6–3, 6–2 |
| Runner-up | 5. | 2 August 2010 | San Marino | Clay | (Netherlands) Robin Haase | 2–6, 6–7^{(8–10)} |
| Runner-up | 6. | 9 August 2010 | Trani, Italy | Clay | (Netherlands) Jesse Huta Galung | 6–7^{(3–7)}, 4–6 |
| Runner-up | 7. | 28 March 2011 | Barletta, Italy | Clay | (Slovenia) Aljaž Bedene | 5–7, 3–6 |
| Runner-up | 8. | 18 April 2011 | Napoli, Italy | Clay | (Netherlands) Thomas Schoorel | 2–6, 6–7^{(4–7)} |
| Winner | 9. | 18 July 2011 | Orbetello, Italy | Clay | (Italy) Matteo Viola | 4–6, 6–3, 6–2 |
| Runner-up | 9. | 18 September 2011 | Todi, Italy | Clay | (Argentina) Carlos Berlocq | 3–6, 1–6 |
| Runner-up | 10. | 17 March 2012 | Rabat, Morocco | Clay | (Slovakia) Martin Kližan | 2–6, 3–6 |
| Runner-up | 11. | 12 May 2013 | Rome, Italy | Clay | (Slovenia) Aljaž Bedene | 4–6, 2–6 |
| Winner | 10. | 23 June 2013 | Milan, Italy | Clay | (Slovakia) Andrej Martin | 6–3, 6–2 |
| Winner | 11. | 28 July 2013 | Orbetello, Italy | Clay | (Spain) Pere Riba | 6–4, 7–6^{(9–7)} |
| Runner-up | 12. | 11 August 2013 | City of San Marino, San Marino | Clay | (Italy) Marco Cecchinato | 3–6, 4–6 |
| Runner-up | 13. | 8 September 2013 | Genoa, Italy | Clay | (Germany) Dustin Brown | 6–7^{(5–7)}, 3–6 |
| Winner | 12. | 17 November 2013 | São Paulo, Brazil | Clay | (Colombia) Alejandro González | 4–6, 6–4, 6–2 |
| Runner-up | 14. | 14 September 2014 | Biella, Italy | Clay | (Italy) Matteo Viola | 5–7, 1–6 |

== Performance timelines ==
Key
| W | F | SF | QF | #R | RR | Q# | DNQ | A | NH |

(W) winner; (F) finalist; (SF) semifinalist; (QF) quarterfinalist; (#R) rounds 4, 3, 2, 1; (RR) round-robin stage; (Q#) qualification round; (DNQ) did not qualify; (A) absent; (NH) not held; (SR) strike rate (events won / competed); (W–L) win–loss record.

=== Singles ===
| Tournament | 2001 | 2002 | 2003 | 2004 | 2005 | 2006 | 2007 | 2008 | 2009 | 2010 | 2011 | 2012 | 2013 | 2014 | 2015 | 2016 | SR | W–L | Win % |
|---|---|---|---|---|---|---|---|---|---|---|---|---|---|---|---|---|---|---|---|
Grand Slam tournaments
| Australian Open | A | A | Q3 | 2R | 1R | 1R | 1R | 1R | A | A | 1R | 1R | 1R | 1R | A | A | 0 / 9 | 1–9 | 10.00 |
| French Open | A | A | 1R | 1R | 3R | 2R | 4R | 1R | Q2 | Q1 | 1R | 1R | Q2 | 1R | Q2 | Q1 | 0 / 9 | 6–9 | 40.00 |
| Wimbledon | A | A | 1R | 2R | 1R | 1R | 1R | 1R | A | A | 1R | 1R | A | 1R | A | A | 0 / 9 | 1–9 | 10.00 |
| US Open | A | A | 1R | 2R | 1R | 1R | 1R | A | A | A | 1R | 1R | 1R | A | A | A | 0 / 8 | 1–8 | 11.11 |
| Win–loss | 0–0 | 0–0 | 0–3 | 3–4 | 2–4 | 1–4 | 3–4 | 0–3 | 0–0 | 0–0 | 0–4 | 0–4 | 0–2 | 0–3 | 0–0 | 0–0 | 0 / 35 | 9–35 | 20.45 |
ATP World Tour Masters 1000
| Indian Wells Masters | A | A | A | 1R | 1R | 2R | 1R | 1R | A | A | A | A | A | A | A | A | 0 / 5 | 0–5 | 00.00 |
| Miami Masters | A | A | A | A | 1R | 3R | 2R | 1R | A | A | A | A | A | 1R | A | A | 0 / 4 | 2–5 | 28.57 |
| Monte-Carlo Masters | A | A | QF | 1R | QF | 1R | 1R | 2R | A | A | 1R | 2R | Q2 | Q2 | Q1 | Q1 | 0 / 8 | 8–8 | 50.00 |
| Madrid Masters^{1} | A | A | A | A | 1R | A | 1R | A | A | A | A | A | A | A | A | A | 0 / 2 | 0–2 | 00.00 |
| Rome Masters | 1R | 1R | QF | 3R | 2R | 2R | SF | 1R | 1R | 3R | 2R | 1R | 1R | 1R | A | 1R | 0 / 15 | 14–15 | 48.28 |
| Canada Masters | A | A | A | A | A | A | A | A | A | A | A | A | A | A | A | | 0 / 0 | 0–0 | – |
| Cincinnati Masters | A | A | A | A | 1R | A | 1R | A | A | A | A | A | A | A | A | | 0 / 2 | 0–2 | 00.00 |
| Shanghai Masters^{2} | A | A | 1R | 1R | QF | 2R | 2R | 1R | A | A | A | A | A | A | A | | 0 / 5 | 4–5 | 44.44 |
| Paris Masters | A | A | A | 1R | A | A | 2R | A | A | A | A | A | A | A | A | | 0 / 2 | 1–2 | 33.33 |
| Win–loss | 0–1 | 0–1 | 6–3 | 2–5 | 7–7 | 3–5 | 7–8 | 1–5 | 0–1 | 2–1 | 1–2 | 1–2 | 0–1 | 0–2 | 0–0 | 0–1 | 0 / 45 | 30–45 | 40.00 |
Career Statistics
| Titles–Finals | 0–0 | 0–0 | 0–1 | 1–3 | 0–1 | 1–3 | 0–0 | 0–0 | 0–0 | 0–0 | 0–0 | 0–1 | 0–0 | 0–0 | 0–0 | 0–0 | 2 / 9 | 2–7 | 22.22 |
| Year End Ranking | 213 | 153 | 47 | 43 | 38 | 38 | 40 | 102 | 215 | 91 | 69 | 88 | 71 | 212 | 192 | | $3,915,403 | | |

^{1} Was played on hardcourt from 2002 to 2008.
^{2} Held as Hamburg Masters until 2008 and Shanghai Masters from 2009.

=== Doubles ===
Current as far as the 2012 US Open (tennis).

| Tournament | 2003 | 2004 | 2005 | 2006 | 2007 | 2008 | 2009 | 2010 | 2011 | 2012 | 2013 | W–L |
|---|---|---|---|---|---|---|---|---|---|---|---|---|
Grand Slam tournaments
| Australian Open | A | 1R | 2R | A | 1R | 1R | A | A | A | A | A | 1–4 |
| French Open | A | 1R | 2R | 1R | 2R | 1R | A | A | 2R | 2R | A | 4–7 |
| Wimbledon | A | 1R | 1R | A | A | A | A | A | A | A | A | 0–2 |
| US Open | 2R | 1R | 2R | 1R | 1R | A | A | A | A | A | A | 2–5 |
| Win–loss | 1–1 | 0–4 | 3–4 | 0–2 | 1–3 | 0–2 | 0–0 | 0–0 | 1–1 | 1–1 | | 7–18 |

== Top 10 wins ==
- Volandri has an 8–23 (.258) record against players who were, at the time the match was played, ranked in the top 10.

| Season | 1997 | 1998 | 1999 | 2000 | 2001 | 2002 | 2003 | 2004 | 2005 | 2006 | 2007 | 2008 | 2009 | 2010 | 2011 | 2012 | 2013 | 2014 | 2015 | 2016 | Total |
| Wins | 0 | 0 | 0 | 0 | 0 | 0 | 1 | 1 | 0 | 3 | 3 | 0 | 0 | 0 | 0 | 0 | 0 | 0 | 0 | 0 | 8 |

| # | Player | Rank | Event | Surface | Rd | Score |
2003
| 1. | (France) Sébastien Grosjean | 10 | Stuttgart, Germany | Clay | 2R | 6–2, 6–1 |
2004
| 2. | (Spain) Carlos Moyà | 4 | Umag, Croatia | Clay | SF | 6–3, 6–2 |
2006
| 3. | (Russia) Nikolay Davydenko | 5 | Doha, Qatar | Hard | QF | 6–3, 6–4 |
| 4. | (Argentina) David Nalbandian | 3 | World Team Cup, Düsseldorf, Germany | Clay | RR | 6–4, 7–5 |
| 5. | (Spain) Tommy Robredo | 7 | Davis Cup, Torre del Greco, Italy | Clay | RR | 6–3, 7–5, 6–3 |
2007
| 6. | (Switzerland) Roger Federer | 1 | Rome, Italy | Clay | 3R | 6–2, 6–4 |
| 7. | (United Kingdom) Andy Murray | 10 | Hamburg, Germany | Clay | 1R | 1–5, r. |
| 8. | (Croatia) Ivan Ljubičić | 7 | Roland Garros, Paris, France | Clay | 3R | 6–4, 6–7^{(4–7)}, 4–6, 6–3, 6–4 |
