= 2011 ITF Men's Circuit (July–September) =

The 2011 ITF Men's Circuit is the 2011 edition of the third-tier tour for men's professional tennis. It is organised by the International Tennis Federation and is a tier below the ATP Challenger Tour. During the months of July and September more than 179 tournaments were played with the majority being played in the month of August.

== Key ==
$15,000 tournaments
$10,000 tournaments

== July ==
Week of	Tournament	Winner	Runners-up	Semifinalists	Quarterfinalists
July 4	Armenia F1 Futures; Yerevan, Armenia; Clay $15,000	(Croatia) Dino Marcan; 4–6, 6–2, 6–3	(Croatia) Toni Androić	(Ukraine) Aleksandr Agafonov (Russia) Alexander Rumyantsev	(Russia) Valery Rudnev (Georgia (country)) George Tsivadze (Russia) Ervand Gasparyan (Russia) Andrey Kumantsov
July 4	Armenia F1 Futures; Yerevan, Armenia; Clay $15,000	(Russia) Ervand Gasparyan (Russia) Ilia Starkov; 6–4, 5–7, [12–10]	(Croatia) Marin Draganja (Croatia) Dino Marcan	(Ukraine) Aleksandr Agafonov (Russia) Alexander Rumyantsev	(Russia) Valery Rudnev (Georgia (country)) George Tsivadze (Russia) Ervand Gasparyan (Russia) Andrey Kumantsov
July 4	Austria F1 Futures; Telfs, Austria; Clay $10,000	(Austria) Nicolas Reissig; 6–3, 6–1	(Austria) Marc Rath	(Austria) Bastian Trinker (Slovakia) Norbert Gombos	(Austria) Marcus Weiglhofer (Germany) Marc Sieber (Germany) Peter Steinberger (Austria) Pascal Brunner
July 4	Austria F1 Futures; Telfs, Austria; Clay $10,000	(Austria) Gerald Melzer (Austria) Marc Rath; 6–1, 7–5	(Italy) Riccardo Bellotti (Austria) Lukas Jastraunig	(Austria) Bastian Trinker (Slovakia) Norbert Gombos	(Austria) Marcus Weiglhofer (Germany) Marc Sieber (Germany) Peter Steinberger (Austria) Pascal Brunner
July 4	Belgium F2 Futures; Havré, Belgium; Clay $10,000	(France) Nicolas Devilder; 7–5, 6–3	(Belgium) Yannik Reuter	(Belgium) Germain Gigounon (Belgium) Arthur De Greef	(Spain) Óscar Sabate-Bretos (France) Gleb Sakharov (Belgium) Yannick Vandenbulcke (Belgium) Julien Dubail
July 4	Belgium F2 Futures; Havré, Belgium; Clay $10,000	(Netherlands) Jannick Lupescu (Netherlands) Lennert van der Linden; 4–6, 6–4, [10–5]	(Czech Republic) Martin Přikryl (Slovakia) Adrian Sikora	(Belgium) Germain Gigounon (Belgium) Arthur De Greef	(Spain) Óscar Sabate-Bretos (France) Gleb Sakharov (Belgium) Yannick Vandenbulcke (Belgium) Julien Dubail
July 4	Brazil F20 Futures; Curitiba, Brazil; Clay $10,000	(Brazil) Ricardo Hocevar; 6–4, 6–2	(Brazil) Daniel Dutra da Silva	(Argentina) Cristián Benedetti (Argentina) Juan-Pablo Villar	(Italy) Alessandro Bega (Brazil) Rodrigo Guidolin (Brazil) Danilo Ferraz (Brazil) Fabiano de Paula
July 4	Brazil F20 Futures; Curitiba, Brazil; Clay $10,000	(Brazil) Danilo Ferraz (Brazil) Ricardo Siggia; 6–7^{(5–7)}, 6–4, [11–9]	(Argentina) Fabricio Burdisso (Argentina) Martín Ríos-Benítez	(Argentina) Cristián Benedetti (Argentina) Juan-Pablo Villar	(Italy) Alessandro Bega (Brazil) Rodrigo Guidolin (Brazil) Danilo Ferraz (Brazil) Fabiano de Paula
July 4	Chile F6 Futures; Antofagasta, Chile; Clay $10,000	The singles quarterfinals and doubles semifinals were cancelled due to excessive bad weather leaving the courts unplayable.			(Chile) Guillermo Rivera Aránguiz (Ecuador) Juan Sebastián Vivanco (Argentina) Gastón-Arturo Grimolizzi (Chile) Marcelo Plaza (Chile) Rodrigo Pérez (Argentina) Patricio Heras (Argentina) Facundo Mena (Argentina) Federico Coria
July 4	Chinese Taipei F1 Futures; Taipei, Chinese Taipei; Hard $15,000	(Chinese Taipei) Yang Tsung-hua; 6–0, 6–3	(Japan) Junn Mitsuhashi	(Chinese Taipei) Lee Hsin-han (Chinese Taipei) Chen Ti	(India) Sanam Singh (Thailand) Perakiat Siriluethaiwattana (Chinese Taipei) Lee Meng-hua (Japan) Kento Takeuchi
July 4	Chinese Taipei F1 Futures; Taipei, Chinese Taipei; Hard $15,000	(Chinese Taipei) Hsieh Cheng-peng (Chinese Taipei) Lee Hsin-han; 6–3, 6–2	(Japan) Yuichi Ito (Chinese Taipei) Yi Chu-huan	(Chinese Taipei) Lee Hsin-han (Chinese Taipei) Chen Ti	(India) Sanam Singh (Thailand) Perakiat Siriluethaiwattana (Chinese Taipei) Lee Meng-hua (Japan) Kento Takeuchi
July 4	France F11 Futures; Bourg-en-Bresse, France; Clay $15,000+H	(Serbia) Miljan Zekić; 6–3, 6–4	(Belgium) Alexandre Folie	(France) Gianni Mina (Germany) Sami Reinwein	(France) Laurent Rochette (France) Tak Khunn Wang (France) Florian Reynet (France) Julien Obry
July 4	France F11 Futures; Bourg-en-Bresse, France; Clay $15,000+H	(France) Laurent Rochette (India) Divij Sharan; 7–6^{(7–1)}, 6–0	(Belgium) Alexandre Folie (France) Florian Reynet	(France) Gianni Mina (Germany) Sami Reinwein	(France) Laurent Rochette (France) Tak Khunn Wang (France) Florian Reynet (France) Julien Obry
July 4	Germany F8 Futures; Römerberg, Germany; Clay $10,000	(Czech Republic) Roman Jebavý; 6–2, 6–0	(Chile) Hans Podlipnik Castillo	(Germany) Holger Fischer (Romania) Andrei Mlendea	(Australia) Brydan Klein (Germany) Matthias Kolbe (Poland) Adam Chadaj (Argentina) Juan-Pablo Amado
July 4	Germany F8 Futures; Römerberg, Germany; Clay $10,000	(Argentina) Juan-Pablo Amado (Australia) Brydan Klein; 6–4, 6–1	(Czech Republic) Roman Jebavý (Romania) Andrei Mlendea	(Germany) Holger Fischer (Romania) Andrei Mlendea	(Australia) Brydan Klein (Germany) Matthias Kolbe (Poland) Adam Chadaj (Argentina) Juan-Pablo Amado
July 4	Great Britain F9 Futures; Ilkley, Great Britain; Grass $10,000	(United Kingdom) Joshua Goodall; 7–5, 6–1	(United Kingdom) David Rice	(France) Albano Olivetti (United Kingdom) Sean Thornley	(Switzerland) Alexander Sadecky (United Kingdom) Marcus Willis (United Kingdom) Chris Eaton (United Kingdom) Andrew Fitzpatrick
July 4	Great Britain F9 Futures; Ilkley, Great Britain; Grass $10,000	(United Kingdom) David Rice (United Kingdom) Sean Thornley; 6–7^{(2–7)}, 6–3, [10–7]	(United Kingdom) Chris Eaton (United Kingdom) Joshua Goodall	(France) Albano Olivetti (United Kingdom) Sean Thornley	(Switzerland) Alexander Sadecky (United Kingdom) Marcus Willis (United Kingdom) Chris Eaton (United Kingdom) Andrew Fitzpatrick
July 4	Italy F17 Futures; Sassuolo, Italy; Clay $15,000	(Australia) James Duckworth; 6–1, 6–2	(Italy) Thomas Fabbiano	(Italy) Federico Gaio (Italy) Marco Cecchinato	(Italy) Marco Bortolotti (Italy) Nicola Ghedin (Italy) Filippo Leonardi (Italy) Federico Torresi
July 4	Italy F17 Futures; Sassuolo, Italy; Clay $15,000	(Italy) Francesco Aldi (Italy) Marco Cecchinato; 6–4, 6–3	(Italy) Filippo Leonardi (Italy) Jacopo Marchegiani	(Italy) Federico Gaio (Italy) Marco Cecchinato	(Italy) Marco Bortolotti (Italy) Nicola Ghedin (Italy) Filippo Leonardi (Italy) Federico Torresi
July 4	Romania F5 Futures; Focșani, Romania; Clay $10,000	(Romania) Petru-Alexandru Luncanu; 6–4 ret.	(Lebanon) Bassam Beidas	(Romania) Victor Ioniță (Spain) Jordi Samper Montaña	(Romania) Răzvan Sabău (Czech Republic) Michal Schmid (Czech Republic) Jiří Školoudík (Switzerland) Riccardo Maiga
July 4	Romania F5 Futures; Focșani, Romania; Clay $10,000	(Romania) Alexandru-Daniel Carpen (Moldova) Andrei Ciumac; 6–3, 6–7^{(4–7)}, [10–4]	(Sweden) Jesper Brunström (Sweden) Markus Eriksson	(Romania) Victor Ioniță (Spain) Jordi Samper Montaña	(Romania) Răzvan Sabău (Czech Republic) Michal Schmid (Czech Republic) Jiří Školoudík (Switzerland) Riccardo Maiga
July 4	Spain F23 Futures; Bakio, Spain; Hard $10,000	(Italy) Claudio Grassi; 6–7^{(6–8)}, 7–6^{(19–17)}, 6–2	(France) Rudy Coco	(Spain) Enrique López Pérez (South Africa) Nikala Scholtz	(Spain) Iván Arenas-Gualda (Spain) Javier Pulgar-García (France) Alexis Musialek (Spain) Axel Álvarez Llamas
July 4	Spain F23 Futures; Bakio, Spain; Hard $10,000	(South Africa) Ruan Roelofse (South Africa) Nikala Scholtz; 7–5, 6–3	(Italy) Francesco Borgo (Italy) Claudio Grassi	(Spain) Enrique López Pérez (South Africa) Nikala Scholtz	(Spain) Iván Arenas-Gualda (Spain) Javier Pulgar-García (France) Alexis Musialek (Spain) Axel Álvarez Llamas
July 4	USA F17 Futures; Pittsburgh, USA; Clay $10,000	(United States) Brian Baker; 7–5, 6–3	(United States) Bjorn Fratangelo	(United States) Adam El Mihdawy (United States) Chase Buchanan	(Italy) Erik Crepaldi (United States) Austin Krajicek (United States) Harry Fowler (United States) Mitchell Frank
July 4	USA F17 Futures; Pittsburgh, USA; Clay $10,000	(Barbados) Haydn Lewis (United States) Denis Zivkovic; 6–2, 6–1	(United States) Mitchell Frank (United States) Robbye Poole	(United States) Adam El Mihdawy (United States) Chase Buchanan	(Italy) Erik Crepaldi (United States) Austin Krajicek (United States) Harry Fowler (United States) Mitchell Frank
July 11	Armenia F2 Futures; Yerevan, Armenia; Clay $15,000	(Croatia) Toni Androić; 6–3, 6–4	(Russia) Ervand Gasparyan	(Russia) Ivan Nedelko (Russia) Nikoloz Basilashvili	(Russia) Mikhail Vasiliev (Ukraine) Stanislav Poplavskyy (Ukraine) Aleksandr Agafonov (Russia) Valery Rudnev
July 11	Armenia F2 Futures; Yerevan, Armenia; Clay $15,000	(Croatia) Marin Draganja (Croatia) Dino Marcan; 6–7(^{4–7)}, 6–4, [10–5]	(Russia) Ervand Gasparyan (Russia) Ilia Starkov	(Russia) Ivan Nedelko (Russia) Nikoloz Basilashvili	(Russia) Mikhail Vasiliev (Ukraine) Stanislav Poplavskyy (Ukraine) Aleksandr Agafonov (Russia) Valery Rudnev
July 11	Austria F2 Futures; Kramsach, Austria; Clay $10,000	(Slovakia) Norbert Gombos; 6–4, 6–3	(Germany) Alexander Flock	(Switzerland) Michael Lammer (Czech Republic) Roman Jebavý	(Italy) Luca Vanni (Italy) Riccardo Bellotti (Slovakia) Jozef Kovalík (Austria) Philipp Oswald
July 11	Austria F2 Futures; Kramsach, Austria; Clay $10,000	(Austria) Maximilian Neuchrist (Austria) Tristan-Samuel Weissborn; 6–3, 6–3	(Czech Republic) Roman Jebavý (Czech Republic) Roman Vögeli	(Switzerland) Michael Lammer (Czech Republic) Roman Jebavý	(Italy) Luca Vanni (Italy) Riccardo Bellotti (Slovakia) Jozef Kovalík (Austria) Philipp Oswald
July 11	Belgium F3 Futures; Knokke, Belgium; Clay $10,000	(Netherlands) Matwé Middelkoop; 6–2, 6–3	(France) Julien Obry	(Belgium) Arthur De Greef (Belgium) Alexandre Folie	(Belgium) Yannik Reuter (Spain) Óscar Sabate-Bretos (Belgium) Gaëtan de Lovinfosse (Slovakia) Adrian Sikora
July 11	Belgium F3 Futures; Knokke, Belgium; Clay $10,000	(Slovakia) Michal Pažický (Slovakia) Adrian Sikora; 6–4, 6–4	(Netherlands) Jannick Lupescu (Netherlands) Alban Meuffels	(Belgium) Arthur De Greef (Belgium) Alexandre Folie	(Belgium) Yannik Reuter (Spain) Óscar Sabate-Bretos (Belgium) Gaëtan de Lovinfosse (Slovakia) Adrian Sikora
July 11	Brazil F21 Futures; Curitiba, Brazil; Clay $10,000	(Brazil) José Pereira; 7–6^{(7–4)}, 6–2	(Brazil) Tiago Lopes	(Brazil) João Pedro Sorgi (Argentina) Juan-Pablo Villar	(Brazil) André Miele (Brazil) Thales Turini (Brazil) Fabiano de Paula (Brazil) Eduardo Dischinger
July 11	Brazil F21 Futures; Curitiba, Brazil; Clay $10,000	(Brazil) Tiago Lopes (Brazil) André Miele; 6–3, 6–7^{(6–8)}, [11–9]	(Brazil) Fabrício Neis (Brazil) Gabriel Pereira	(Brazil) João Pedro Sorgi (Argentina) Juan-Pablo Villar	(Brazil) André Miele (Brazil) Thales Turini (Brazil) Fabiano de Paula (Brazil) Eduardo Dischinger
July 11	Chinese Taipei F2 Futures; Taipei, Chinese Taipei; Hard $15,000	(Japan) Hiroki Moriya; 6–3, 4–6, 6–3	(South Korea) An Jae-sung	(Chinese Taipei) Yang Tsung-hua (Chinese Taipei) Chen Ti	(Japan) Junn Mitsuhashi (Chinese Taipei) Wang Chieh-fu (Indonesia) Christopher Rungkat (Japan) Kento Takeuchi
July 11	Chinese Taipei F2 Futures; Taipei, Chinese Taipei; Hard $15,000	(Chinese Taipei) Hsieh Cheng-peng (Chinese Taipei) Lee Hsin-han; 1–6, 6–3, [10–5]	(Chinese Taipei) Huang Liang-chi (South Korea) Jeong Suk-young	(Chinese Taipei) Yang Tsung-hua (Chinese Taipei) Chen Ti	(Japan) Junn Mitsuhashi (Chinese Taipei) Wang Chieh-fu (Indonesia) Christopher Rungkat (Japan) Kento Takeuchi
July 11	France F12 Futures; Saint-Gervais, France; Clay $15,000	(France) Grégoire Burquier; 4–6, 7–5, 6–2	(Netherlands) Antal van der Duim	(France) Jérôme Inzerillo (France) Florian Reynet	(France) Tak Khunn Wang (France) Hugo Nys (France) Simon Cauvard (Germany) Sami Reinwain
July 11	France F12 Futures; Saint-Gervais, France; Clay $15,000	(India) Divij Sharan (Netherlands) Antal van der Duim; 6–3, 6–2	(France) Simon Cauvard (France) Baptiste Dupuy	(France) Jérôme Inzerillo (France) Florian Reynet	(France) Tak Khunn Wang (France) Hugo Nys (France) Simon Cauvard (Germany) Sami Reinwain
July 11	Great Britain F10 Futures; Frinton, Great Britain; Grass $10,000	(United Kingdom) Joshua Goodall; 6–3, 6–2	(United Kingdom) Daniel Evans	(Australia) Michael Look (United Kingdom) Chris Eaton	(United Kingdom) Edward Corrie (United Kingdom) James Marsalek (United Kingdom) David Rice (Switzerland) Alexander Sadecky
July 11	Great Britain F10 Futures; Frinton, Great Britain; Grass $10,000	(France) Julien Maes (France) Fabrice Martin; 7–5, 7–6^{(7–2)}	(United Kingdom) Chris Eaton (United Kingdom) Joshua Goodall	(Australia) Michael Look (United Kingdom) Chris Eaton	(United Kingdom) Edward Corrie (United Kingdom) James Marsalek (United Kingdom) David Rice (Switzerland) Alexander Sadecky
July 11	Italy F18 Futures; Modena, Italy; Clay $15,000	(Italy) Thomas Fabbiano; 6–4, 6–4	(France) Laurent Rochette	(Italy) Marco Crugnola (Austria) Nikolaus Moser	(Italy) Francesco Borgo (Italy) Stefano Travaglia (Italy) Daniele Giorgini (Italy) Alberto Brizzi
July 11	Italy F18 Futures; Modena, Italy; Clay $15,000	(Austria) Nikolaus Moser (Austria) Max Raditschnigg; 6–4, 6–3	(Italy) Federico Torresi (Italy) Stefano Travaglia	(Italy) Marco Crugnola (Austria) Nikolaus Moser	(Italy) Francesco Borgo (Italy) Stefano Travaglia (Italy) Daniele Giorgini (Italy) Alberto Brizzi
July 11	Romania F6 Futures; Pitești, Romania; Clay $10,000	(France) Axel Michon; 6–3, 6–0	(Romania) Robert Coman	(Germany) Peter Heller (Czech Republic) Libor Salaba	(Romania) Victor Ioniță (Romania) Petru-Alexandru Luncanu (France) Thomas le Boulch (Greece) Paris Gemouchidis
July 11	Romania F6 Futures; Pitești, Romania; Clay $10,000	(Greece) Paris Gemouchidis (Greece) Alexandros Jakupovic; 6–7^{(5–7)}, 6–3, [10–5]	(France) Antoine Escoffier (France) Thomas le Boulch	(Germany) Peter Heller (Czech Republic) Libor Salaba	(Romania) Victor Ioniță (Romania) Petru-Alexandru Luncanu (France) Thomas le Boulch (Greece) Paris Gemouchidis
July 11	Spain F24 Futures; Elche, Spain; Hard $10,000	(Russia) Ilya Belyaev; 6–2, 7–5	(Italy) Enrico Burzi	(Spain) Miguel Ángel López Jaén (Belgium) Niels Desein	(Spain) Carles Poch Gradin (Italy) Marco Viola (Australia) Maverick Banes (Spain) David Estruch
July 11	Spain F24 Futures; Elche, Spain; Hard $10,000	(Spain) Miguel Ángel López Jaén (Spain) Carles Poch Gradin; 3–6, 6–0, [10–3]	(Italy) Claudio Fortuna (Portugal) Gonçalo Pereira	(Spain) Miguel Ángel López Jaén (Belgium) Niels Desein	(Spain) Carles Poch Gradin (Italy) Marco Viola (Australia) Maverick Banes (Spain) David Estruch
July 11	USA F18 Futures; Rochester, USA; Clay $10,000	(Romania) Gabriel Moraru; 6–4, 6–2	(Zimbabwe) Takanyi Garanganga	(United States) Robbye Poole (United States) Maciek Sykut	(United States) Tennys Sandgren (Italy) Erik Crepaldi (United States) Chris Kwon (United States) Denis Zivkovic
July 11	USA F18 Futures; Rochester, USA; Clay $10,000	(United States) Maciek Sykut (United States) Denis Zivkovic; 6–3, 3–6, [10–7]	(Italy) Erik Crepaldi (United States) Bjorn Fratangelo	(United States) Robbye Poole (United States) Maciek Sykut	(United States) Tennys Sandgren (Italy) Erik Crepaldi (United States) Chris Kwon (United States) Denis Zivkovic
July 18	Austria F3 Futures; Fieberbrunn, Austria; Clay $10,000	(Switzerland) Michael Lammer; 4–6, 6–4, 6–2	(Czech Republic) Marek Michalička	(Italy) Riccardo Bellotti (Czech Republic) Roman Vögeli	(Switzerland) Henri Laaksonen (Germany) Richard Waite (Spain) Óscar Sabate-Bretos (Czech Republic) Jiří Školoudík
July 18	Austria F3 Futures; Fieberbrunn, Austria; Clay $10,000	(Hungary) Kornél Bardóczky (Croatia) Mislav Hižak; 7–6^{(7–2)}, 6–4	(Italy) Riccardo Bellotti (Austria) Gerald Melzer	(Italy) Riccardo Bellotti (Czech Republic) Roman Vögeli	(Switzerland) Henri Laaksonen (Germany) Richard Waite (Spain) Óscar Sabate-Bretos (Czech Republic) Jiří Školoudík
July 18	Belgium F4 Futures; Middelkerke, Belgium; Hard $10,000	(Germany) Stefan Seifert; 6–2, 6–2	(France) Sébastien Boltz	(Belgium) Niels Desein (Belgium) Alexandre Folie	(France) Jonathan Milsztajn (Switzerland) Adrien Bossel (United Kingdom) Alexander Ward (United Kingdom) James Marsalek
July 18	Belgium F4 Futures; Middelkerke, Belgium; Hard $10,000	(Netherlands) Miliaan Niesten (Netherlands) Xander Spong; 1–6, 6–0, [10–4]	(Romania) Andrei Dăescu (France) Gleb Sakharov	(Belgium) Niels Desein (Belgium) Alexandre Folie	(France) Jonathan Milsztajn (Switzerland) Adrien Bossel (United Kingdom) Alexander Ward (United Kingdom) James Marsalek
July 18	Brazil F22 Futures; Jundiaí, Brazil; Clay $10,000	(Brazil) Diego Matos; 6–4, 6–4	(Brazil) Tiago Lopes	(Brazil) Júlio Silva (Brazil) Fabiano de Paula	(Brazil) Raony Carvalho (Brazil) Tiago Slonik (Italy) Emanuele Molina (Argentina) Juan-Pablo Villar
July 18	Brazil F22 Futures; Jundiaí, Brazil; Clay $10,000	(United States) Andrea Collarini (Brazil) Diego Matos; 6–3, 6–4	(Brazil) Tiago Lopes (Brazil) Víctor Maynard	(Brazil) Júlio Silva (Brazil) Fabiano de Paula	(Brazil) Raony Carvalho (Brazil) Tiago Slonik (Italy) Emanuele Molina (Argentina) Juan-Pablo Villar
July 18	Canada F3 Futures; Mississauga, Canada; Hard $15,000	(China) Li Zhe; 6–2, 6–3	(Canada) Steven Diez	(China) Gong Maoxin (El Salvador) Marcelo Arévalo	(United States) Bjorn Fratangelo (Canada) Filip Peliwo (United States) Denis Zivkovic (United States) Peter Aarts
July 18	Canada F3 Futures; Mississauga, Canada; Hard $15,000	(China) Gong Maoxin (China) Li Zhe; 6–4, 7–6^{(7–1)}	(United States) Peter Aarts (Canada) Daniel Chu	(China) Gong Maoxin (El Salvador) Marcelo Arévalo	(United States) Bjorn Fratangelo (Canada) Filip Peliwo (United States) Denis Zivkovic (United States) Peter Aarts
July 18	Estonia F1 Futures; Tallinn, Estonia; Clay $15,000	(Estonia) Jürgen Zopp; 6–3, 6–3	(Chile) Hans Podlipnik Castillo	(France) Axel Michon (Finland) Harri Heliövaara	(Italy) Antonio Comporto (Belarus) Pavel Filin (Sweden) Markus Eriksson (Estonia) Jaak Põldma
July 18	Estonia F1 Futures; Tallinn, Estonia; Clay $15,000	(Belarus) Aliaksandr Bury (Belarus) Andrei Vasilevski; 4–6, 7–6^{(7–5)}, [10–6]	(Belarus) Pavel Filin (Belarus) Dzmitry Zhyrmont	(France) Axel Michon (Finland) Harri Heliövaara	(Italy) Antonio Comporto (Belarus) Pavel Filin (Sweden) Markus Eriksson (Estonia) Jaak Põldma
July 18	Ireland F1 Futures; Dublin, Ireland; Carpet $15,000	(Republic of Ireland) James McGee; 6–3, 6–3	(France) Charles-Antoine Brézac	(Republic of Ireland) Barry King (Slovakia) Miloslav Mečíř Jr.	(France) Albano Olivetti (Australia) Michael Look (United Kingdom) Marcus Willis (France) Fabrice Martin
July 18	Ireland F1 Futures; Dublin, Ireland; Carpet $15,000	(France) Albano Olivetti (United Kingdom) Neal Skupski; 7–6^{(7–4)}, 6–3	(Republic of Ireland) James Cluskey (Republic of Ireland) James McGee	(Republic of Ireland) Barry King (Slovakia) Miloslav Mečíř Jr.	(France) Albano Olivetti (Australia) Michael Look (United Kingdom) Marcus Willis (France) Fabrice Martin
July 18	Italy F19 Futures; Fano, Italy; Clay $15,000+H	(Belgium) Yannick Mertens; 6–4, 5–7, 6–2	(Argentina) Nicolás Pastor	(Italy) Enrico Burzi (Italy) Alberto Brizzi	(Mexico) Manuel Sánchez (Italy) Luca Vanni (Italy) Stefano Travaglia (Italy) Riccardo Sinicropi
July 18	Italy F19 Futures; Fano, Italy; Clay $15,000+H	(Italy) Stefano Ianni (Italy) Luca Vanni; 6–7^{(7–2)}, 6–3, [10–6]	(Mexico) César Ramírez (Australia) Nima Roshan	(Italy) Enrico Burzi (Italy) Alberto Brizzi	(Mexico) Manuel Sánchez (Italy) Luca Vanni (Italy) Stefano Travaglia (Italy) Riccardo Sinicropi
July 18	Spain F25 Futures; Gandia, Spain; Clay $10,000	(Spain) David Estruch; 7–5, 6–4	(Australia) Matt Reid	(Spain) Carles Poch Gradin (Japan) Taro Daniel	(Russia) Ilya Belyaev (Venezuela) Ricardo Rodríguez (Netherlands) Matthew Pierot (Kazakhstan) Denis Yevseyev
July 18	Spain F25 Futures; Gandia, Spain; Clay $10,000	(Spain) Iván Arenas-Gualda (Spain) Enrique López Pérez; 6–4, 7–6^{(7–0)}	(Italy) Massimo Capone (Italy) Giulio Torroni	(Spain) Carles Poch Gradin (Japan) Taro Daniel	(Russia) Ilya Belyaev (Venezuela) Ricardo Rodríguez (Netherlands) Matthew Pierot (Kazakhstan) Denis Yevseyev
July 18	Turkey F20 Futures; İzmir, Turkey; Clay $10,000	(Austria) Michael Linzer; 7–6^{(7–3)}, 6–4	(Italy) Edoardo Eremin	(Sweden) Patrik Rosenholm (Greece) Alexandros Jakupovic	(Australia) Brydan Klein (Australia) Dane Propoggia (Italy) Damiano di Ienno (Italy) Claudio Grassi
July 18	Turkey F20 Futures; İzmir, Turkey; Clay $10,000	(Greece) Paris Gemouchidis (Greece) Alexandros Jakupovic walkover	(Moldova) Andrei Ciumac (Russia) Ivan Nedelko	(Sweden) Patrik Rosenholm (Greece) Alexandros Jakupovic	(Australia) Brydan Klein (Australia) Dane Propoggia (Italy) Damiano di Ienno (Italy) Claudio Grassi
July 18	USA F19 Futures; Tulsa, USA; Hard $10,000	(Australia) John-Patrick Smith; 6–1, 6–0	(United States) Chris Wettengel	(United States) Mitchell Frank (Bulgaria) Dimitar Kutrovsky	(United States) Robbye Poole (Czech Republic) Rudolf Siwy (Zimbabwe) Takanyi Garanganga (United States) Kyle McMorrow
July 18	USA F19 Futures; Tulsa, USA; Hard $10,000	(United States) Benjamin Rogers (Australia) John-Patrick Smith; 6–2, 6–3	(United States) Nick Papac (Czech Republic) Rudolf Siwy	(United States) Mitchell Frank (Bulgaria) Dimitar Kutrovsky	(United States) Robbye Poole (Czech Republic) Rudolf Siwy (Zimbabwe) Takanyi Garanganga (United States) Kyle McMorrow
July 25	Austria F4 Futures; Bad Waltersdorf, Austria; Clay $10,000	(Germany) Kevin Krawietz; 7–6^{(7–3)}, 6–1	(Austria) Gerald Melzer	(Austria) Pascal Brunner (Slovakia) Michal Pažický	(Germany) David Thurner (Italy) Riccardo Bellotti (Slovenia) Blaž Rola (Slovakia) Norbert Gombos
July 25	Austria F4 Futures; Bad Waltersdorf, Austria; Clay $10,000	(Italy) Riccardo Bellotti (Austria) Gerald Melzer; 7–5, 7–5	(Spain) Óscar Sabate-Bretos (Chile) Ricardo Urzúa-Rivera	(Austria) Pascal Brunner (Slovakia) Michal Pažický	(Germany) David Thurner (Italy) Riccardo Bellotti (Slovenia) Blaž Rola (Slovakia) Norbert Gombos
July 25	Belgium F5 Futures; Heist-aan-Zee, Belgium; Clay $10,000	(France) Nicolas Devilder; 6–3, 7–6^{(8–6)}	(Germany) Peter Torebko	(Belgium) Arthur De Greef (Belgium) Julien Dubail	(France) Julien Obry (Switzerland) Adrien Bossel (Belgium) Niels Desein (France) Alexandre Penaud
July 25	Belgium F5 Futures; Heist-aan-Zee, Belgium; Clay $10,000	(Netherlands) David de Goede (Netherlands) Wesley Koolhof; 6–4, 6–3	(Belgium) Germain Gigounon (France) Julien Obry	(Belgium) Arthur De Greef (Belgium) Julien Dubail	(France) Julien Obry (Switzerland) Adrien Bossel (Belgium) Niels Desein (France) Alexandre Penaud
July 25	Canada F4 Futures; Saskatoon, Canada; Hard $15,000	(Canada) Vasek Pospisil; 7–5, 6–2	(Canada) Érik Chvojka	(Australia) Chris Letcher (Canada) Steven Diez	(Australia) Isaac Frost (Australia) Mark Verryth (United States) Maciek Sykut (South Africa) Renier Moolman
July 25	Canada F4 Futures; Saskatoon, Canada; Hard $15,000	(Canada) Érik Chvojka (Australia) Chris Letcher; 6–4, 6–2	(United States) Peter Aarts (Canada) Kamil Pajkowski	(Australia) Chris Letcher (Canada) Steven Diez	(Australia) Isaac Frost (Australia) Mark Verryth (United States) Maciek Sykut (South Africa) Renier Moolman
July 25	Estonia F2 Futures; Kuressaare, Estonia; Clay $10,000	(Chile) Hans Podlipnik Castillo; 1–6, 6–2, 6–0	(Slovakia) Jozef Kovalík	(France) Axel Michon (Latvia) Andis Juška	(Estonia) Vladimir Ivanov (Belarus) Aliaksandr Bury (Sweden) Markus Eriksson (Belarus) Andrei Vasilevski
July 25	Estonia F2 Futures; Kuressaare, Estonia; Clay $10,000	(Latvia) Andis Juška (Latvia) Deniss Pavlovs; 6–3, 7–6^{(7–3)}	(Estonia) Vladimir Ivanov (Chile) Hans Podlipnik Castillo	(France) Axel Michon (Latvia) Andis Juška	(Estonia) Vladimir Ivanov (Belarus) Aliaksandr Bury (Sweden) Markus Eriksson (Belarus) Andrei Vasilevski
July 25	Great Britain F11 Futures; Chiswick, Great Britain; Hard $15,000	(United Kingdom) Chris Eaton; 7–5, 6–1	(Australia) Benjamin Mitchell	(United Kingdom) Joshua Milton (France) Élie Rousset	(United Kingdom) David Rice (United Kingdom) Joshua Goodall (France) Simon Cauvard (United Kingdom) Daniel Evans
July 25	Great Britain F11 Futures; Chiswick, Great Britain; Hard $15,000	(United Kingdom) Liam Broady (United Kingdom) Daniel Evans; 7–6^{(7–3)}, 4–6, [10–7]	(United Kingdom) Lewis Burton (United Kingdom) Edward Corrie	(United Kingdom) Joshua Milton (France) Élie Rousset	(United Kingdom) David Rice (United Kingdom) Joshua Goodall (France) Simon Cauvard (United Kingdom) Daniel Evans
July 25	Italy F20 Futures; La Spezia, Italy; Clay $15,000+H	(Austria) Philipp Oswald; 6–3, 4–6, 6–2	(Italy) Alessandro Giannessi	(Italy) Daniele Giorgini (Italy) Walter Trusendi	(Monaco) Benjamin Balleret (Italy) Luca Vanni (Italy) Matteo Marrai (Italy) Manuel Jorquera
July 25	Italy F20 Futures; La Spezia, Italy; Clay $15,000+H	(Italy) Davide della Tommasina (Italy) Riccardo Sinicropi; 7–6^{(7–3)}, 6–1	(Italy) Alessandro Giannessi (Italy) Walter Trusendi	(Italy) Daniele Giorgini (Italy) Walter Trusendi	(Monaco) Benjamin Balleret (Italy) Luca Vanni (Italy) Matteo Marrai (Italy) Manuel Jorquera
July 25	Serbia F4 Futures; Kikinda, Serbia; Clay $10,000	(Montenegro) Goran Tošić; 6–3, 6–1	(France) Gleb Sakharov	(Serbia) Arsenije Zlatanović (Serbia) Danilo Petrović	(Serbia) Nikola Ćaćić (Croatia) Josip Mešin (Croatia) Ante Pavić (Ukraine) Vadim Alekseenko
July 25	Serbia F4 Futures; Kikinda, Serbia; Clay $10,000	(Croatia) Mislav Hižak (Croatia) Ante Pavić; 7–5, 7–5	(Serbia) Nikola Ćaćić (Montenegro) Goran Tošić	(Serbia) Arsenije Zlatanović (Serbia) Danilo Petrović	(Serbia) Nikola Ćaćić (Croatia) Josip Mešin (Croatia) Ante Pavić (Ukraine) Vadim Alekseenko
July 25	Spain F26 Futures; Dénia, Spain; Clay $10,000	(Spain) Marc Giner; 6–4, 6–1	(Spain) Carlos Calderón-Rodríguez	(Australia) Matt Reid (Spain) David Estruch	(Spain) Rafael Mazón-Hernández (Australia) Maverick Banes (Japan) Taro Daniel (Venezuela) Ricardo Rodríguez
July 25	Spain F26 Futures; Dénia, Spain; Clay $10,000	(Spain) Iván Arenas-Gualda (Spain) Enrique López Pérez; 6–2, 6–4	(Spain) Guillermo Gómez-Díaz (United Kingdom) Michael Suleau	(Australia) Matt Reid (Spain) David Estruch	(Spain) Rafael Mazón-Hernández (Australia) Maverick Banes (Japan) Taro Daniel (Venezuela) Ricardo Rodríguez
July 25	Turkey F21 Futures; İzmir, Turkey; Clay $10,000	(Austria) Michael Linzer; 6–3, 6–2	(France) Jérôme Inzerillo	(Italy) Edoardo Eremin (Australia) Dane Propoggia	(Sweden) Patrik Rosenholm (Italy) Alessandro Colella (Greece) Paris Gemouchidis (France) François-Arthur Vibert
July 25	Turkey F21 Futures; İzmir, Turkey; Clay $10,000	(Italy) Francesco Borgo (Australia) Dane Propoggia; 4–6, 6–3, [10–4]	(Italy) Alessandro Colella (Italy) Edoardo Eremin	(Italy) Edoardo Eremin (Australia) Dane Propoggia	(Sweden) Patrik Rosenholm (Italy) Alessandro Colella (Greece) Paris Gemouchidis (France) François-Arthur Vibert
July 25	USA F20 Futures; Godfrey, USA; Hard $10,000	(United States) Tennys Sandgren; 6–2, 7–5	(Czech Republic) Rudolf Siwy	(Australia) John Peers (United States) Jeff Dadamo	(United States) Dennis Novikov (United States) Ty Trombetta (Bulgaria) Dimitar Kutrovsky (Italy) Erik Crepaldi
July 25	USA F20 Futures; Godfrey, USA; Hard $10,000	(United States) Jeff Dadamo (United States) Austin Krajicek; 6–2, 6–3	(United States) Joel Kielbowicz (United States) Chris Kwon	(Australia) John Peers (United States) Jeff Dadamo	(United States) Dennis Novikov (United States) Ty Trombetta (Bulgaria) Dimitar Kutrovsky (Italy) Erik Crepaldi

== August ==
Week of	Tournament	Winner	Runners-up	Semifinalists	Quarterfinalists
August 1	Belgium F6 Futures; Ostend, Belgium; Clay $10,000	(Germany) Peter Torebko; 6–4, 6–0	(France) Alexandre Sidorenko	(Belgium) Alexandre Folie (Netherlands) Antal van der Duim	(Belgium) Niels Desein (Belgium) Arthur De Greef (France) Maxime Forcin (Germany) Sami Reinwein
August 1	Belgium F6 Futures; Ostend, Belgium; Clay $10,000	(Netherlands) Bart Brons (Netherlands) Roel Oostdam; 1–6, 7–5, [11–9]	(Belgium) Louis Cant (Belgium) Alexander Cornelissen	(Belgium) Alexandre Folie (Netherlands) Antal van der Duim	(Belgium) Niels Desein (Belgium) Arthur De Greef (France) Maxime Forcin (Germany) Sami Reinwein
August 1	Ecuador F4 Futures; Guayaquil, Ecuador; Hard $15,000	(Argentina) Guido Andreozzi; 7–5, 7–6^{(7–5)}	(Ecuador) Julio César Campozano	(Mexico) Miguel Gallardo-Vallés (Venezuela) Román Recarte	(Colombia) Alejandro González (Ecuador) Iván Endara (Uruguay) Ariel Behar (Guatemala) Christopher Díaz Figueroa
August 1	Ecuador F4 Futures; Guayaquil, Ecuador; Hard $15,000	(Ecuador) Iván Endara (Ecuador) Roberto Quiroz; 7–6^{(7–1)}, 2–6, [10–7]	(Ecuador) Julio César Campozano (Ecuador) Emilio Gómez	(Mexico) Miguel Gallardo-Vallés (Venezuela) Román Recarte	(Colombia) Alejandro González (Ecuador) Iván Endara (Uruguay) Ariel Behar (Guatemala) Christopher Díaz Figueroa
August 1	Germany F9 Futures; Wetzlar, Germany; Clay $10,000	(Germany) Steven Moneke; 1–6, 6–3, 7–6^{(7–3)}	(Germany) Alexander Flock	(Germany) Kevin Krawietz (Italy) Federico Torresi	(Czech Republic) Jakub Lustyk (Germany) Tim Pütz (Germany) Jean Zietsman (Germany) Constantin Christ
August 1	Germany F9 Futures; Wetzlar, Germany; Clay $10,000	(Germany) Maximilian Dinslaken (Germany) Malte Stropp; 7–5, 7–5	(Germany) Matthias Kolbe (Germany) Steven Moneke	(Germany) Kevin Krawietz (Italy) Federico Torresi	(Czech Republic) Jakub Lustyk (Germany) Tim Pütz (Germany) Jean Zietsman (Germany) Constantin Christ
August 1	Great Britain F12 Futures; London, Great Britain; Hard $15,000	(United Kingdom) Jamie Baker; 6–1, 4–6, 6–1	(United Kingdom) Edward Corrie	(United Kingdom) Joshua Goodall (Italy) Riccardo Ghedin	(United Kingdom) Matthew Short (United Kingdom) Neal Skupski (United Kingdom) Chris Eaton (United Kingdom) James Marsalek
August 1	Great Britain F12 Futures; London, Great Britain; Hard $15,000	(United Kingdom) David Rice (United Kingdom) Sean Thornley; 6–3, 6–2	(South Africa) Ruan Roelofse (India) Sanam Singh	(United Kingdom) Joshua Goodall (Italy) Riccardo Ghedin	(United Kingdom) Matthew Short (United Kingdom) Neal Skupski (United Kingdom) Chris Eaton (United Kingdom) James Marsalek
August 1	Italy F21 Futures; Avezzano, Italy; Clay $10,000	(Italy) Riccardo Sinicropi; 4–6, 7–6^{(7–2)}, 3–1, ret.	(Italy) Walter Trusendi	(Romania) Răzvan Sabău (Argentina) Kevin Konfederak	(Italy) Marco Viola (Italy) Giulio Torroni (Switzerland) Riccardo Maiga (Japan) Takao Suzuki
August 1	Italy F21 Futures; Avezzano, Italy; Clay $10,000	(Italy) Francesco Borgo (Italy) Nicola Ghedin; 4–6, 7–5, [10–8]	(Italy) Massimo Capone (Italy) Marco Viola	(Romania) Răzvan Sabău (Argentina) Kevin Konfederak	(Italy) Marco Viola (Italy) Giulio Torroni (Switzerland) Riccardo Maiga (Japan) Takao Suzuki
August 1	Kazakhstan F4 Futures; Almaty, Kazakhstan; Hard $15,000	(Tunisia) Malek Jaziri; 6–3, 6–2	(Ukraine) Denys Molchanov	(India) Karan Rastogi (India) Ranjeet Virali-Murugesan	(India) Rupesh Roy (Belarus) Sergey Betov (Czech Republic) Roman Jebavý (Japan) Arata Onozawa
August 1	Kazakhstan F4 Futures; Almaty, Kazakhstan; Hard $15,000	(Kazakhstan) Alexey Kedryuk (Russia) Mikhail Vasiliev; 6–4, 4–6, [11–9]	(India) Rohan Gajjar (India) Karan Rastogi	(India) Karan Rastogi (India) Ranjeet Virali-Murugesan	(India) Rupesh Roy (Belarus) Sergey Betov (Czech Republic) Roman Jebavý (Japan) Arata Onozawa
August 1	Lithuania F1 Futures; Vilnius, Lithuania; Clay $10,000	(Chile) Hans Podlipnik Castillo; 6–3, 1–6, 7–5	(Estonia) Vladimir Ivanov	(Germany) Jonas Lütjen (Ukraine) Stanislav Poplavskyy	(Germany) Marco Lenz (Lithuania) Gvidas Sabeckis (Latvia) Deniss Pavlovs (Russia) Ivan Nedelko
August 1	Lithuania F1 Futures; Vilnius, Lithuania; Clay $10,000	(Chile) Hans Podlipnik Castillo (Belarus) Andrei Vasilevski; 6–2, 6–2	(Belarus) Nikolai Fidirko (Belarus) Egor Gerasimov	(Germany) Jonas Lütjen (Ukraine) Stanislav Poplavskyy	(Germany) Marco Lenz (Lithuania) Gvidas Sabeckis (Latvia) Deniss Pavlovs (Russia) Ivan Nedelko
August 1	Russia F4 Futures; Moscow, Russia; Clay $15,000	(Russia) Ervand Gasparyan; 6–4, 6–0	(Russia) Alexander Rumyantsev	(Russia) Nikoloz Basilashvili (Russia) Stanislav Vovk	(Russia) Sergei Krotiouk (Russia) Richard Muzaev (Russia) Ashot Khacharyan (Russia) Evgeny Kirillov
August 1	Russia F4 Futures; Moscow, Russia; Clay $15,000	(Russia) Victor Baluda (Russia) Alexander Rumyantsev; 6–4, 6–2	(Russia) Mikhail Fufygin (Russia) Sergei Krotiouk	(Russia) Nikoloz Basilashvili (Russia) Stanislav Vovk	(Russia) Sergei Krotiouk (Russia) Richard Muzaev (Russia) Ashot Khacharyan (Russia) Evgeny Kirillov
August 1	Serbia F5 Futures; Sombor, Serbia; Clay $10,000	(Montenegro) Goran Tošić; 6–3, 6–2	(Serbia) Vladimir Obradović	(Serbia) Saša Stojisavljević (Serbia) Ivan Bjelica	(Bosnia and Herzegovina) Franjo Raspudić (Serbia) Nikola Ćaćić (France) Gleb Sakharov (France) Nicolas Rosenzweig
August 1	Serbia F5 Futures; Sombor, Serbia; Clay $10,000	(Serbia) Nikola Ćaćić (Montenegro) Goran Tošić; 6–3, 6–4	(Serbia) Ivan Bjelica (Serbia) Vladimir Obradović	(Serbia) Saša Stojisavljević (Serbia) Ivan Bjelica	(Bosnia and Herzegovina) Franjo Raspudić (Serbia) Nikola Ćaćić (France) Gleb Sakharov (France) Nicolas Rosenzweig
August 1	Slovakia F1 Futures; Piešťany, Slovakia; Clay $10,000	(Czech Republic) Jan Šátral; 6–7^{(5–7)}, 6–1, 6–4	(Slovakia) Michal Pažický	(Slovakia) Jan Stančík (Czech Republic) Ľubomír Majšajdr	(Slovakia) Adrian Sikora (Czech Republic) Robert Rumler (Slovakia) Michal Milko (Czech Republic) Michal Konečný
August 1	Slovakia F1 Futures; Piešťany, Slovakia; Clay $10,000	(Czech Republic) Ľubomír Majšajdr (Czech Republic) Jan Šátral; 7–6^{(7–3)}, 7–6^{(7–4)}	(Poland) Adam Chadaj (Czech Republic) Michal Konečný	(Slovakia) Jan Stančík (Czech Republic) Ľubomír Majšajdr	(Slovakia) Adrian Sikora (Czech Republic) Robert Rumler (Slovakia) Michal Milko (Czech Republic) Michal Konečný
August 1	Spain F27 Futures; Xàtiva, Spain; Clay $10,000	(Venezuela) David Souto; 6–2, 7–6^{(8–6)}	(Australia) Matt Reid	(Japan) Hiroyasu Ehara (Japan) Taro Daniel	(Spain) Marc Giner (Spain) José Checa Calvo (Spain) Jordi Samper Montaña (Spain) David Estruch
August 1	Spain F27 Futures; Xàtiva, Spain; Clay $10,000	(Italy) Francesco Aldi (Italy) Marco Cecchinato; 6–4, 6–3	(Spain) Iván Arenas-Gualda (Spain) Enrique López Pérez	(Japan) Hiroyasu Ehara (Japan) Taro Daniel	(Spain) Marc Giner (Spain) José Checa Calvo (Spain) Jordi Samper Montaña (Spain) David Estruch
August 1	Turkey F22 Futures; İzmir, Turkey; Clay $10,000	(France) Constantin Belot; 1–6, 7–6^{(7–0)}, 6–1	(Sweden) Patrik Brydolf	(France) Jérôme Inzerillo (France) François-Arthur Vibert	(Italy) Omar Giacalone (Sweden) Patrik Rosenholm (Australia) Dane Propoggia (France) Thomas le Boulch
August 1	Turkey F22 Futures; İzmir, Turkey; Clay $10,000	(Australia) Brydan Klein (Australia) Dane Propoggia; 3–6, 6–3, [10–5]	(Moldova) Andrei Ciumac (Greece) Paris Gemouchidis	(France) Jérôme Inzerillo (France) François-Arthur Vibert	(Italy) Omar Giacalone (Sweden) Patrik Rosenholm (Australia) Dane Propoggia (France) Thomas le Boulch
August 1	USA F21 Futures; Decatur, USA; Hard $10,000	(United States) Tennys Sandgren; 6–3, 6–1	(Lebanon) Bassam Beidas	(Belarus) Kiryl Harbatsiuk (United States) Roy Kalmanovich	(Argentina) Carlos Llanés (Australia) John Peers (United States) Jeff Dadamo (United States) Evan King
August 1	USA F21 Futures; Decatur, USA; Hard $10,000	(South Africa) Jean Andersen (United States) Joshua Zavala; 6–4, 6–4	(United States) Devin Britton (United States) Bradley Cox	(Belarus) Kiryl Harbatsiuk (United States) Roy Kalmanovich	(Argentina) Carlos Llanés (Australia) John Peers (United States) Jeff Dadamo (United States) Evan King
August 8	Argentina F10 Futures; Buenos Aires, Argentina; Clay $10,000	(United States) Andrea Collarini; 6–4, 6–3	(Argentina) Patricio Heras	(Argentina) Juan-Pablo Villar (Argentina) Diego Schwartzman	(Argentina) Sebastián Decoud (Argentina) Valentín Florez (Argentina) Gabriel Alejandro Hidalgo (Argentina) Guillermo Carry
August 8	Argentina F10 Futures; Buenos Aires, Argentina; Clay $10,000	(Argentina) Guillermo Bujniewicz (Argentina) Alejandro Fabbri; 4–6, 6–3, [10–8]	(Argentina) Guillermo Carry (Argentina) Facundo Mena	(Argentina) Juan-Pablo Villar (Argentina) Diego Schwartzman	(Argentina) Sebastián Decoud (Argentina) Valentín Florez (Argentina) Gabriel Alejandro Hidalgo (Argentina) Guillermo Carry
August 8	Austria F5 Futures; Innsbruck, Austria; Clay $10,000	(Italy) Riccardo Bellotti; 6–2, 4–6, 6–1	(Germany) Alexander Flock	(Italy) Marco Bella (Czech Republic) Michal Konečný	(Greece) Paris Gemouchidis (Austria) Tristan-Samuel Weissborn (Spain) Óscar Sabate-Bretos (France) Yanais Laurent
August 8	Austria F5 Futures; Innsbruck, Austria; Clay $10,000	(Croatia) Mate Pavić (Austria) Tristan-Samuel Weissborn; 7–6^{(7–3)}, 6–4	(Greece) Paris Gemouchidis (Czech Republic) Michal Konečný	(Italy) Marco Bella (Czech Republic) Michal Konečný	(Greece) Paris Gemouchidis (Austria) Tristan-Samuel Weissborn (Spain) Óscar Sabate-Bretos (France) Yanais Laurent
August 8	Belgium F7 Futures; Eupen, Belgium; Clay $10,000	(Belgium) Yannik Reuter; 6–4, 4–6, 6–0	(Belgium) Alexandre Folie	(Belgium) Germain Gigounon (Belgium) Gaëtan de Lovinfosse	(France) Tak Khunn Wang (Belgium) Louis Cant (Romania) Cătălin Gârd (Chile) Guillermo Hormazábal
August 8	Belgium F7 Futures; Eupen, Belgium; Clay $10,000	(Belgium) Julien Dubail (Belgium) Germain Gigounon; 7–6^{(7–5)}, 3–6, [10–4]	(Belgium) Laurent-Olivier Daxhelet (France) Romain Sichez	(Belgium) Germain Gigounon (Belgium) Gaëtan de Lovinfosse	(France) Tak Khunn Wang (Belgium) Louis Cant (Romania) Cătălin Gârd (Chile) Guillermo Hormazábal
August 8	Brazil F25 Futures; Fortaleza, Brazil; Clay $10,000	(Brazil) Ricardo Hocevar; 6–2, 7–6^{(7–2)}	(Brazil) Marcelo Demoliner	(Brazil) João Pedro Sorgi (Brazil) Rafael Camilo	(Brazil) Tiago Lopes (Brazil) Caio Zampieri (Brazil) André Miele (Sweden) Christian Lindell
August 8	Brazil F25 Futures; Fortaleza, Brazil; Clay $10,000	(Brazil) Guilherme Clézar (Brazil) Caio Zampieri; 7–6^{(7–3)}, 2–6, [10–8]	(Brazil) Rafael Camilo (Brazil) Marcelo Demoliner	(Brazil) João Pedro Sorgi (Brazil) Rafael Camilo	(Brazil) Tiago Lopes (Brazil) Caio Zampieri (Brazil) André Miele (Sweden) Christian Lindell
August 8	Ecuador F5 Futures; Guayaquil, Ecuador; Hard $15,000	(Uruguay) Marcel Felder; 4–6, 7–5, 6–1	(Ecuador) Iván Endara	(Ecuador) Julio César Campozano (Argentina) Cristián Benedetti	(Colombia) Alejandro González (Venezuela) Román Recarte (Argentina) Guido Andreozzi (Guatemala) Christopher Díaz Figueroa
August 8	Ecuador F5 Futures; Guayaquil, Ecuador; Hard $15,000	(Argentina) Guido Andreozzi (Uruguay) Ariel Behar; 7–6^{(11–9)}, 4–6, [10–8]	(Colombia) Alejandro González (Colombia) Felipe Mantilla	(Ecuador) Julio César Campozano (Argentina) Cristián Benedetti	(Colombia) Alejandro González (Venezuela) Román Recarte (Argentina) Guido Andreozzi (Guatemala) Christopher Díaz Figueroa
August 8	Finland F1 Futures; Vierumäki, Finland; Clay $10,000	(Finland) Timo Nieminen; 6–3, 6–1	(Estonia) Vladimir Ivanov	(Spain) Jordi Samper Montaña (Finland) Juho Paukku	(Finland) Micke Kontinen (Italy) Giulio Torroni (Germany) Jaan-Frederik Brunken (Italy) Alessandro Bega
August 8	Finland F1 Futures; Vierumäki, Finland; Clay $10,000	(Finland) Sami Huurinainen (Finland) Jesper Saarni; 1–6, 6–1, [10–4]	(Finland) Micke Kontinen (Finland) Juho Paukku	(Spain) Jordi Samper Montaña (Finland) Juho Paukku	(Finland) Micke Kontinen (Italy) Giulio Torroni (Germany) Jaan-Frederik Brunken (Italy) Alessandro Bega
August 8	Germany F10 Futures; Friedberg, Germany; Clay $10,000	(Germany) Dennis Blömke; 6–3, 2–6, 7–5	(Germany) Steven Moneke	(Czech Republic) Roman Vögeli (Germany) Richard Waite	(France) François-Arthur Vibert (Germany) Clinton Thomson (Germany) Matthias Kolbe (Germany) Marius Zay
August 8	Germany F10 Futures; Friedberg, Germany; Clay $10,000	(Germany) Matthias Kolbe (Germany) Steven Moneke; 4–6, 6–2, [10–4]	(Germany) Marco Lenz (Germany) George von Massow	(Czech Republic) Roman Vögeli (Germany) Richard Waite	(France) François-Arthur Vibert (Germany) Clinton Thomson (Germany) Matthias Kolbe (Germany) Marius Zay
August 8	Italy F22 Futures; Eppan an der Weinstraße, Italy; Clay $15,000+H	(Argentina) Andrés Molteni; 7–5, 6–4	(Italy) Alessandro Giannessi	(Italy) Antonio Comporto (Italy) Simone Vagnozzi	(Argentina) Juan-Pablo Amado (France) Jonathan Eysseric (Australia) James Duckworth (Mexico) César Ramírez
August 8	Italy F22 Futures; Eppan an der Weinstraße, Italy; Clay $15,000+H	(Italy) Alessandro Giannessi (Italy) Stefano Ianni; 6–2, 6–0	(Argentina) Andrés Molteni (Argentina) Marco Trungelliti	(Italy) Antonio Comporto (Italy) Simone Vagnozzi	(Argentina) Juan-Pablo Amado (France) Jonathan Eysseric (Australia) James Duckworth (Mexico) César Ramírez
August 8	Kazakhstan F5 Futures; Astana, Kazakhstan; Hard $15,000	(India) Karan Rastogi; 6–2, 6–1	(Egypt) Mohamed Safwat	(Japan) Arata Onozawa (Czech Republic) Roman Jebavý	(Ukraine) Denys Molchanov (India) Vijayant Malik (India) Rohan Gajjar (Russia) Vitali Reshetnikov
August 8	Kazakhstan F5 Futures; Astana, Kazakhstan; Hard $15,000	(Czech Republic) Roman Jebavý (Ukraine) Denys Molchanov; 6–4, 6–4	(Russia) Vitali Reshetnikov (Russia) Ilia Starkov	(Japan) Arata Onozawa (Czech Republic) Roman Jebavý	(Ukraine) Denys Molchanov (India) Vijayant Malik (India) Rohan Gajjar (Russia) Vitali Reshetnikov
August 8	Latvia F1 Futures; Jūrmala, Latvia; Clay $10,000	(Italy) Claudio Grassi; 6–3, 6–4	(France) Pierre-Hugues Herbert	(Belarus) Dzmitry Zhyrmont (Latvia) Deniss Pavlovs	(Italy) Roberto Marcora (Portugal) Gonçalo Pereira (Chile) Hans Podlipnik Castillo (Italy) Damiano di Ienno
August 8	Latvia F1 Futures; Jūrmala, Latvia; Clay $10,000	(Latvia) Andis Juška (Latvia) Deniss Pavlovs; 6–3, 6–4	(Italy) Claudio Grassi (Italy) Matteo Volante	(Belarus) Dzmitry Zhyrmont (Latvia) Deniss Pavlovs	(Italy) Roberto Marcora (Portugal) Gonçalo Pereira (Chile) Hans Podlipnik Castillo (Italy) Damiano di Ienno
August 8	Peru F1 Futures; Arequipa, Peru; Clay $10,000+H	(Argentina) Maximiliano Estévez; 7–6^{(7–2)}, 7–6^{(7–3)}	(Peru) Duilio Beretta	(Chile) Cristóbal Saavedra Corvalán (Argentina) Guido Pella	(Argentina) Joaquín-Jésus Monteferrario (Peru) Jorge Panta (Peru) Sergio Galdós (Argentina) Agustín Velotti
August 8	Peru F1 Futures; Arequipa, Peru; Clay $10,000+H	(Peru) Duilio Beretta (Peru) Sergio Galdós; 6–4, 6–0	(Uruguay) Martín Cuevas (Argentina) Guido Pella	(Chile) Cristóbal Saavedra Corvalán (Argentina) Guido Pella	(Argentina) Joaquín-Jésus Monteferrario (Peru) Jorge Panta (Peru) Sergio Galdós (Argentina) Agustín Velotti
August 8	Poland F5 Futures; Bydgoszcz, Poland; Clay $15,000	(Czech Republic) Dušan Lojda; 6–0, 6–3	(Poland) Piotr Gadomski	(Poland) Marcin Gawron (Poland) Mateusz Kowalczyk	(Poland) Robert Godlewski (Poland) Grzegorz Panfil (Italy) Enrico Burzi (Czech Republic) Jan Mertl
August 8	Poland F5 Futures; Bydgoszcz, Poland; Clay $15,000	(Poland) Andriej Kapaś (Poland) Mateusz Kowalczyk; 7–5, 6–4	(Poland) Piotr Gadomski (Poland) Maciej Smoła	(Poland) Marcin Gawron (Poland) Mateusz Kowalczyk	(Poland) Robert Godlewski (Poland) Grzegorz Panfil (Italy) Enrico Burzi (Czech Republic) Jan Mertl
August 8	Russia F5 Futures; Moscow, Russia; Clay $15,000+H	(Netherlands) Nick van der Meer; 6–4, 4–6, 6–4	(Russia) Andrey Kumantsov	(Russia) Mikhail Fufygin (Russia) Alexander Rumyantsev	(Russia) Denis Matsukevich (Russia) Stanislav Vovk (Russia) Valery Rudnev (Moldova) Andrei Gorban
August 8	Russia F5 Futures; Moscow, Russia; Clay $15,000+H	(Russia) Alexander Pavlioutchenkov (Russia) Stanislav Vovk; 6–3, 6–7^{(5–7)}, [10–6]	(Sweden) Patrik Brydolf (Moldova) Andrei Ciumac	(Russia) Mikhail Fufygin (Russia) Alexander Rumyantsev	(Russia) Denis Matsukevich (Russia) Stanislav Vovk (Russia) Valery Rudnev (Moldova) Andrei Gorban
August 8	Serbia F6 Futures; Subotica, Serbia; Clay $10,000	(Croatia) Dino Marcan; 6–1, 2–6, 6–3	(France) Mathieu Rodrigues	(Hungary) Ádám Kellner (Hungary) Dénes Lukács	(Slovenia) Blaž Rola (France) Gleb Sakharov (Serbia) Saša Stojisavljević (Egypt) Karim-Mohamed Maamoun
August 8	Serbia F6 Futures; Subotica, Serbia; Clay $10,000	(Croatia) Dino Marcan (Croatia) Antonio Sančić; 6–4, 4–6, [10–7]	(Hungary) Ádám Kellner (Hungary) Dénes Lukács	(Hungary) Ádám Kellner (Hungary) Dénes Lukács	(Slovenia) Blaž Rola (France) Gleb Sakharov (Serbia) Saša Stojisavljević (Egypt) Karim-Mohamed Maamoun
August 8	Slovakia F2 Futures; Tatranská Lomnica, Slovakia; Clay $10,000	(Slovakia) Jozef Kovalík; 6–2, 4–6, 6–3	(Czech Republic) Daniel Lustig	(Slovakia) Kamil Čapkovič (Slovakia) Norbert Gombos	(Slovakia) Adrian Sikora (Czech Republic) Marek Michalička (Hungary) Márton Fucsovics (Czech Republic) Jiří Veselý
August 8	Slovakia F2 Futures; Tatranská Lomnica, Slovakia; Clay $10,000	(Slovakia) Jozef Kovalík (Slovakia) Adrian Sikora; 6–2, 6–1	(Slovakia) Maroš Horný (Czech Republic) Jan Surovič	(Slovakia) Kamil Čapkovič (Slovakia) Norbert Gombos	(Slovakia) Adrian Sikora (Czech Republic) Marek Michalička (Hungary) Márton Fucsovics (Czech Republic) Jiří Veselý
August 8	Spain F28 Futures; Irun, Spain; Clay $15,000	(Spain) Pablo Carreño Busta; 6–4, 6–7^{(4–7)}, 6–4	(Argentina) Martín Alund	(Spain) Roberto Carballés (France) Romain Jouan	(Netherlands) Antal van der Duim (Spain) Íñigo Cervantes Huegun (Spain) Carles Poch Gradin (Venezuela) David Souto
August 8	Spain F28 Futures; Irun, Spain; Clay $15,000	(Spain) Roberto Carballés (Spain) Pablo Carreño Busta; 6–4, 6–2	(Spain) Enrique López Pérez (Spain) Jaime Pulgar-García	(Spain) Roberto Carballés (France) Romain Jouan	(Netherlands) Antal van der Duim (Spain) Íñigo Cervantes Huegun (Spain) Carles Poch Gradin (Venezuela) David Souto
August 8	Turkey F23 Futures; Istanbul, Turkey; Hard $10,000	(Italy) Riccardo Ghedin; 6–3, 6–3	(Australia) Brydan Klein	(France) Rudy Coco (Sweden) Patrik Rosenholm	(India) Vijay Sundar Prashanth (Turkey) Haluk Akkoyun (Syria) Marc Abdulnour (United Kingdom) Alexander Ward
August 8	Turkey F23 Futures; Istanbul, Turkey; Hard $10,000	(Australia) Brydan Klein (Australia) Dane Propoggia; 6–3, 7–6^{(7–3)}	(Italy) Riccardo Ghedin (India) Vijay Sundar Prashanth	(France) Rudy Coco (Sweden) Patrik Rosenholm	(India) Vijay Sundar Prashanth (Turkey) Haluk Akkoyun (Syria) Marc Abdulnour (United Kingdom) Alexander Ward
August 8	USA F22 Futures; Edwardsville, USA; Hard $10,000	(United States) Blake Strode; 7–6^{(7–4)}, 6–3	(United States) Evan King	(United States) Mousheg Hovhannisyan (United States) Jeff Dadamo	(Australia) John-Patrick Smith (United States) Chase Buchanan (United States) Devin Britton (Australia) John Peers
August 8	USA F22 Futures; Edwardsville, USA; Hard $10,000	(United States) Nicolas Meister (Australia) John Peers; 6–2, 6–4	(United States) Devin Britton (United States) Bradley Cox	(United States) Mousheg Hovhannisyan (United States) Jeff Dadamo	(Australia) John-Patrick Smith (United States) Chase Buchanan (United States) Devin Britton (Australia) John Peers
August 15	Argentina F11 Futures; Neuquén, Argentina; Clay $10,000	(Argentina) Leandro Migani; 6–4, 6–4	(Argentina) Alejandro Fabbri	(Argentina) Juan-Manuel Valverde (Italy) Francesco Garzelli	(Argentina) Juan-Pablo Villar (Argentina) Martín Ríos-Benítez (Argentina) Jonathan Gonzalia (Argentina) Alejandro Kon
August 15	Argentina F11 Futures; Neuquén, Argentina; Clay $10,000	(Argentina) Valentín Florez (Argentina) Juan Vázquez-Valenzuela; 5–7, 6–2, [10–8]	(Argentina) Fabricio Burdisso (Argentina) Sebastián Prieto	(Argentina) Juan-Manuel Valverde (Italy) Francesco Garzelli	(Argentina) Juan-Pablo Villar (Argentina) Martín Ríos-Benítez (Argentina) Jonathan Gonzalia (Argentina) Alejandro Kon
August 15	Austria F6 Futures; Wels, Austria; Clay $10,000	(Czech Republic) Michal Konečný; 5–7, 6–4, 7–6^{(7–4)}	(Spain) Óscar Sabate-Bretos	(Italy) Antonio Comporto (Austria) Tristan-Samuel Weissborn	(Czech Republic) Roman Vögeli (Greece) Paris Gemouchidis (Austria) Pascal Brunner (Austria) Philip Lang
August 15	Austria F6 Futures; Wels, Austria; Clay $10,000	(Austria) Lukas Jastraunig (Austria) Philip Lang; 6–4, 4–6, [11–9]	(Greece) Paris Gemouchidis (France) Yanaïs Laurent	(Italy) Antonio Comporto (Austria) Tristan-Samuel Weissborn	(Czech Republic) Roman Vögeli (Greece) Paris Gemouchidis (Austria) Pascal Brunner (Austria) Philip Lang
August 15	Belgium F8 Futures; Koksijde, Belgium; Clay $10,000	(Belgium) Germain Gigounon; 6–3, 6–4	(France) Tak Khunn Wang	(Belgium) Arthur De Greef (Belgium) Marco Dierckx	(France) Maxime Tabatruong (Belgium) Julien Dubail (Netherlands) Wesley Koolhof (Netherlands) Alban Meuffels
August 15	Belgium F8 Futures; Koksijde, Belgium; Clay $10,000	(Netherlands) Wesley Koolhof (Netherlands) Alban Meuffels; 7–6^{(7–2)}, 7–5	(Belgium) Marco Dierckx (Belgium) Bart Govaerts	(Belgium) Arthur De Greef (Belgium) Marco Dierckx	(France) Maxime Tabatruong (Belgium) Julien Dubail (Netherlands) Wesley Koolhof (Netherlands) Alban Meuffels
August 15	Brazil F26 Futures; São José do Rio Preto, Brazil; Clay $15,000	(Brazil) Caio Zampieri; 7–6^{(7–5)}, 7–6^{(7–3)}	(Brazil) Guilherme Clézar	(Brazil) Bruno Sant'Anna (Brazil) Tiago Lopes	(Brazil) Fabrício Neis (Brazil) Marcelo Demoliner (Brazil) Rafael Camilo (Sweden) Christian Lindell
August 15	Brazil F26 Futures; São José do Rio Preto, Brazil; Clay $15,000	(Brazil) Rodrigo Grilli (Brazil) André Miele; 6–4, 6–3	(Brazil) Augusto Laranja (Brazil) Carlos Oliveira	(Brazil) Bruno Sant'Anna (Brazil) Tiago Lopes	(Brazil) Fabrício Neis (Brazil) Marcelo Demoliner (Brazil) Rafael Camilo (Sweden) Christian Lindell
August 15	Colombia F3 Futures; Bogotá, Colombia; Clay $15,000	(Colombia) Eduardo Struvay; 6–2, 7–6^{(9–7)}	(Chile) Guillermo Rivera Aránguiz	(New Zealand) Artem Sitak (Colombia) Alejandro González	(Argentina) Sebastián Decoud (Ecuador) Julio César Campozano (Argentina) Cristian Benedetti (Brazil) Fabiano de Paula
August 15	Colombia F3 Futures; Bogotá, Colombia; Clay $15,000	(United States) Maciek Sykut (United States) Denis Zivkovic; 6–4, 6–3	(United States) Peter Aarts (Colombia) Juan Sebastián Gómez	(New Zealand) Artem Sitak (Colombia) Alejandro González	(Argentina) Sebastián Decoud (Ecuador) Julio César Campozano (Argentina) Cristian Benedetti (Brazil) Fabiano de Paula
August 15	Croatia F6 Futures; Čakovec, Croatia; Clay $10,000	(Croatia) Toni Androić; 6–4, 6–1	(Croatia) Dino Marcan	(Bosnia and Herzegovina) Tomislav Brkić (Slovenia) Blaž Rola	(Austria) Björn Propst (Croatia) Mislav Hižak (Croatia) Krešimir Ritz (Croatia) Marin Draganja
August 15	Croatia F6 Futures; Čakovec, Croatia; Clay $10,000	(Croatia) Marin Draganja (Croatia) Dino Marcan; 6–7^{(4–7)}, 6–3, [10–3]	(Croatia) Mislav Hižak (Croatia) Ante Pavić	(Bosnia and Herzegovina) Tomislav Brkić (Slovenia) Blaž Rola	(Austria) Björn Propst (Croatia) Mislav Hižak (Croatia) Krešimir Ritz (Croatia) Marin Draganja
August 15	Finland F2 Futures; Kotka, Finland; Clay $10,000	(Sweden) Patrik Rosenholm; 6–1, 6–4	(Estonia) Vladimir Ivanov	(Spain) Jordi Samper Montaña (Germany) Jaan-Frederik Brunken	(Finland) Timo Nieminen (Republic of Ireland) Sam Barry (Germany) Mark-Alexander Kepler (France) Alexandre Penaud
August 15	Finland F2 Futures; Kotka, Finland; Clay $10,000	(Switzerland) Joss Espasandin (France) Yannick Jankovits; 6–3, 6–4	(Sweden) Robin Olin (Finland) Henrik Sillanpää	(Spain) Jordi Samper Montaña (Germany) Jaan-Frederik Brunken	(Finland) Timo Nieminen (Republic of Ireland) Sam Barry (Germany) Mark-Alexander Kepler (France) Alexandre Penaud
August 15	Germany F11 Futures; Karlsruhe, Germany; Clay $10,000	(Germany) Steven Moneke; 6–1, 6–3	(Germany) Nils Langer	(Germany) Kevin Kaczynski (Germany) Michel Dornbusch	(Germany) Ralf Steinbach (Germany) David Thurner (Germany) Marco Lenz (Germany) Kevin Krawietz
August 15	Germany F11 Futures; Karlsruhe, Germany; Clay $10,000	(Germany) Florian Fallert (Germany) Nils Langer; 6–3, 6–4	(Germany) Matthias Kolbe (Germany) Kevin Krawietz	(Germany) Kevin Kaczynski (Germany) Michel Dornbusch	(Germany) Ralf Steinbach (Germany) David Thurner (Germany) Marco Lenz (Germany) Kevin Krawietz
August 15	Italy F23 Futures; Este Padova, Italy; Hard $15,000+H	(Australia) James Duckworth; 6–2, 6–3	(Italy) Daniele Giorgini	(New Zealand) José Statham (Argentina) Renzo Olivo	(Australia) Matt Reid (Italy) Walter Trusendi (Argentina) Juan-Martín Aranguren (Australia) Jason Kubler
August 15	Italy F23 Futures; Este Padova, Italy; Hard $15,000+H	(Austria) Philipp Oswald (Germany) Simon Stadler; 6–3, 6–3	(Australia) Nima Roshan (New Zealand) José Statham	(New Zealand) José Statham (Argentina) Renzo Olivo	(Australia) Matt Reid (Italy) Walter Trusendi (Argentina) Juan-Martín Aranguren (Australia) Jason Kubler
August 15	Mexico F8 Futures; León, Mexico; Clay $10,000	(Uruguay) Marcel Felder; 6–2, 6–3	(United States) Adam El Mihdawy	(Mexico) Daniel Garza (Cuba) Lázaro Navarro	(Mexico) Juan Manuel Elizondo (Mexico) Luis Patiño (Mexico) Miguel Gallardo-Vallés (United States) Roberto Cid
August 15	Mexico F8 Futures; León, Mexico; Clay $10,000	(Bulgaria) Boris Nicola Bakalov (Netherlands) Miliaan Niesten; 6–4, 6–3	(Mexico) Miguel Gallardo-Vallés (Mexico) Pablo Martínez	(Mexico) Daniel Garza (Cuba) Lázaro Navarro	(Mexico) Juan Manuel Elizondo (Mexico) Luis Patiño (Mexico) Miguel Gallardo-Vallés (United States) Roberto Cid
August 15	Peru F2 Futures; Chosica-Lima, Peru; Clay $10,000	(Argentina) Agustín Velotti; 6–4, 6–3	(Chile) Cristóbal Saavedra Corvalán	(Uruguay) Martín Cuevas (Peru) Sergio Galdós	(Argentina) Guido Pella (Brazil) Marlon Oliveira (Argentina) Joaquín-Jésus Monteferrario (Uruguay) Federico Sansonetti
August 15	Peru F2 Futures; Chosica-Lima, Peru; Clay $10,000	(Peru) Mauricio Echazú (Venezuela) Román Recarte; 5–7, 6–4, [10–5]	(Argentina) Guido Andreozzi (Uruguay) Martín Cuevas	(Uruguay) Martín Cuevas (Peru) Sergio Galdós	(Argentina) Guido Pella (Brazil) Marlon Oliveira (Argentina) Joaquín-Jésus Monteferrario (Uruguay) Federico Sansonetti
August 15	Poland F6 Futures; Olsztyn, Poland; Clay $10,000	(Poland) Grzegorz Panfil; 6–2, 6–2	(Poland) Mateusz Szmigiel	(Poland) Andriej Kapaś (Poland) Dawid Celt	(Czech Republic) Libor Salaba (Poland) Robert Godlewski (Japan) Bumpei Sato (Poland) Dawid Olejniczak
August 15	Poland F6 Futures; Olsztyn, Poland; Clay $10,000	(Poland) Błażej Koniusz (Poland) Grzegorz Panfil; 6–3, 6–7^{(4–7)}, [10–6]	(Poland) Arkadiusz Kocyła (Poland) Mikołaj Szmyrgała	(Poland) Andriej Kapaś (Poland) Dawid Celt	(Czech Republic) Libor Salaba (Poland) Robert Godlewski (Japan) Bumpei Sato (Poland) Dawid Olejniczak
August 15	Romania F7 Futures; Iași, Romania; Clay $15,000	(Romania) Gabriel Moraru; 7–5, 6–1	(Romania) Petru-Alexandru Luncanu	(Belgium) Alexandre Folie (Czech Republic) Jiří Veselý	(Romania) Adrian Cruciat (Romania) Răzvan Sabău (Romania) Andrei Mlendea (Romania) Victor Ioniță
August 15	Romania F7 Futures; Iași, Romania; Clay $15,000	(Moldova) Andrei Ciumac (Moldova) Maxim Dubarenco; 6–2, 2–6, [11–9]	(Romania) Victor Anagnastopol (Romania) Florin Mergea	(Belgium) Alexandre Folie (Czech Republic) Jiří Veselý	(Romania) Adrian Cruciat (Romania) Răzvan Sabău (Romania) Andrei Mlendea (Romania) Victor Ioniță
August 15	Russia F6 Futures; Moscow, Russia; Clay $15,000+H	(Russia) Evgeny Kirillov; 7–5, 7–5	(Russia) Ivan Nedelko	(Russia) Valery Rudnev (Russia) Andrey Kuznetsov	(Russia) Nikoloz Basilashvili (Netherlands) Nick van der Meer (Russia) Andrey Kumantsov (Russia) Stanislav Vovk
August 15	Russia F6 Futures; Moscow, Russia; Clay $15,000+H	(Russia) Mikhail Fufygin (Russia) Sergei Krotiouk; 6–4, 6–7^{(14–16)}, [10–8]	(Russia) Andrey Kuznetsov (Latvia) Deniss Pavlovs	(Russia) Valery Rudnev (Russia) Andrey Kuznetsov	(Russia) Nikoloz Basilashvili (Netherlands) Nick van der Meer (Russia) Andrey Kumantsov (Russia) Stanislav Vovk
August 15	Serbia F7 Futures; Novi Sad, Serbia; Clay $10,000	(Austria) Michael Linzer; 6–2, 3–6, 6–2	(Hungary) Dénes Lukács	(Serbia) Miljan Zekić (Serbia) Nikola Ćaćić	(Egypt) Karim-Mohamed Maamoun (Serbia) Ivan Bjelica (Serbia) Miki Janković (Serbia) Peđa Krstin
August 15	Serbia F7 Futures; Novi Sad, Serbia; Clay $10,000	(Serbia) Ivan Bjelica (Serbia) David Savić; 5–7, 6–1, [10–5]	(Serbia) Nikola Ćaćić (Bosnia and Herzegovina) Damir Džumhur	(Serbia) Miljan Zekić (Serbia) Nikola Ćaćić	(Egypt) Karim-Mohamed Maamoun (Serbia) Ivan Bjelica (Serbia) Miki Janković (Serbia) Peđa Krstin
August 15	Slovakia F3 Futures; Michalovce, Slovakia; Clay $10,000	(Czech Republic) Marek Michalička; 2–6, 7–5, 6–2	(Czech Republic) Daniel Lustig	(Slovakia) Norbert Gombos (Slovakia) Jozef Kovalík	(Slovakia) Adrian Sikora (Czech Republic) Ľubomír Majšajdr (Switzerland) Henri Laaksonen (Slovakia) Filip Vittek
August 15	Slovakia F3 Futures; Michalovce, Slovakia; Clay $10,000	(Czech Republic) Ľubomír Majšajdr (Czech Republic) Jan Šátral; 6–4, 3–6, [10–6]	(Czech Republic) Petr Kovačka (Czech Republic) Marek Michalička	(Slovakia) Norbert Gombos (Slovakia) Jozef Kovalík	(Slovakia) Adrian Sikora (Czech Republic) Ľubomír Majšajdr (Switzerland) Henri Laaksonen (Slovakia) Filip Vittek
August 15	Spain F29 Futures; Vigo, Belgium; Clay $15,000	(France) Mathieu Rodrigues; 6–4, 6–3	(Spain) Carlos Calderón-Rodríguez	(Spain) Roberto Carballés (Spain) Andrés Artuñedo	(Japan) Hiroyasu Ehara (Japan) Taro Daniel (Russia) Kirill Dmitriev (Venezuela) Ricardo Rodríguez
August 15	Spain F29 Futures; Vigo, Belgium; Clay $15,000	(Spain) Rafael Mazón-Hernández (India) Ramkumar Ramanathan; 6–3, 6–2	(Japan) Taro Daniel (Japan) Hiroyasu Ehara	(Spain) Roberto Carballés (Spain) Andrés Artuñedo	(Japan) Hiroyasu Ehara (Japan) Taro Daniel (Russia) Kirill Dmitriev (Venezuela) Ricardo Rodríguez
August 22	Argentina F12 Futures; Neuquén, Argentina; Clay $10,000	(Argentina) Juan-Pablo Villar; 7–5, 6–4	(Argentina) Facundo Mena	(Argentina) Gabriel Alejandro Hidalgo (Argentina) Nicolás Jara-Lozano	(Argentina) Alejandro Fabbri (Argentina) Jonathan Gonzalia (Argentina) Juan Ignacio Amarante (Argentina) Alejandro Kon
August 22	Argentina F12 Futures; Neuquén, Argentina; Clay $10,000	(Argentina) Alejandro Fabbri (Argentina) Juan-Pablo Villar; 6–4, 1–6, [10–5]	(Argentina) Tomás Buchhass (Argentina) Mateo Nicolás Martínez	(Argentina) Gabriel Alejandro Hidalgo (Argentina) Nicolás Jara-Lozano	(Argentina) Alejandro Fabbri (Argentina) Jonathan Gonzalia (Argentina) Juan Ignacio Amarante (Argentina) Alejandro Kon
August 22	Austria F7 Futures; Pörtschach, Austria; Clay $10,000	(Italy) Riccardo Bellotti; 6–4, 6–3	(Germany) Kevin Krawietz	(Austria) Tristan-Samuel Weissborn (Italy) Filippo Leonardi	(Austria) Max Raditschnigg (Czech Republic) Robert Rumler (Austria) Maximilian Neuchrist (Austria) Mario Haider-Maurer
August 22	Austria F7 Futures; Pörtschach, Austria; Clay $10,000	(Austria) Max Raditschnigg (Austria) Herbert Wiltschnig; 3–6, 6–3, [10–6]	(Philippines) Ruben Gonzales (United States) Chris Kwon	(Austria) Tristan-Samuel Weissborn (Italy) Filippo Leonardi	(Austria) Max Raditschnigg (Czech Republic) Robert Rumler (Austria) Maximilian Neuchrist (Austria) Mario Haider-Maurer
August 22	Belgium F9 Futures; Jupille, Belgium; Clay $10,000	(France) Baptiste Dupuy; 4–6, 6–3, 6–2	(Belgium) Alexandre Folie	(Belgium) Julien Dubail (Belgium) Germain Gigounon	(Belgium) Marco Dierckx (France) Florent Diep (France) Tak Khunn Wang (Chile) Guillermo Hormazábal
August 22	Belgium F9 Futures; Jupille, Belgium; Clay $10,000	(Chile) Guillermo Hormazábal (Chile) Rodrigo Pérez; 6–4, 7–6^{(7–2)}	(Belgium) Marco Dierckx (Belgium) Sander Gillé	(Belgium) Julien Dubail (Belgium) Germain Gigounon	(Belgium) Marco Dierckx (France) Florent Diep (France) Tak Khunn Wang (Chile) Guillermo Hormazábal
August 22	Colombia F4 Futures; Medellín, Colombia; Clay $15,000	(Colombia) Eduardo Struvay; 6–4, 6–2	(Colombia) Alejandro González	(Brazil) Caio Zampieri (Sweden) Christian Lindell	(Argentina) Cristian Benedetti (Ecuador) Julio César Campozano (New Zealand) Artem Sitak (Brazil) Thiago Alves
August 22	Colombia F4 Futures; Medellín, Colombia; Clay $15,000	(Brazil) Raony Carvalho (Brazil) Fabiano de Paula; 6–3, 6–3	(United States) Peter Aarts (New Zealand) Artem Sitak	(Brazil) Caio Zampieri (Sweden) Christian Lindell	(Argentina) Cristian Benedetti (Ecuador) Julio César Campozano (New Zealand) Artem Sitak (Brazil) Thiago Alves
August 22	Croatia F7 Futures; Vinkovci, Croatia; Clay $10,000	(Serbia) Nikola Ćaćić; 7–6^{(8–6)}, 6–0	(Croatia) Dino Marcan	(Slovenia) Blaž Rola (Bosnia and Herzegovina) Damir Džumhur	(Croatia) Kristijan Mesaroš (Bosnia and Herzegovina) Tomislav Brkić (Croatia) Marin Franjičević (Croatia) Toni Androić
August 22	Croatia F7 Futures; Vinkovci, Croatia; Clay $10,000	(Bosnia and Herzegovina) Tomislav Brkić (Croatia) Marin Franjičević; 3–6, 6–3, [10–7]	(Croatia) Mislav Hižak (Slovenia) Blaž Rola	(Slovenia) Blaž Rola (Bosnia and Herzegovina) Damir Džumhur	(Croatia) Kristijan Mesaroš (Bosnia and Herzegovina) Tomislav Brkić (Croatia) Marin Franjičević (Croatia) Toni Androić
August 22	Finland F3 Futures; Nastola, Finland; Clay $10,000	(Germany) Richard Becker; 7–6^{(8–6)}, 3–6, 6–4	(Finland) Timo Nieminen	(Sweden) Patrik Rosenholm (Spain) Jordi Samper Montaña	(United Kingdom) James Feaver (France) Alexandre Penaud (Estonia) Vladimir Ivanov (Italy) Alessandro Bega
August 22	Finland F3 Futures; Nastola, Finland; Clay $10,000	(Republic of Ireland) Sam Barry (Republic of Ireland) Daniel Glancy; 6–4, 6–2	(Finland) Herkko Pöllänen (Finland) Max Wennakoski	(Sweden) Patrik Rosenholm (Spain) Jordi Samper Montaña	(United Kingdom) James Feaver (France) Alexandre Penaud (Estonia) Vladimir Ivanov (Italy) Alessandro Bega
August 22	Germany F12 Futures; Überlingen, Germany; Clay $10,000	(Austria) Johannes Ager; 4–6, 6–1, 7–5	(Germany) Dennis Blömke	(Switzerland) Raphael Lustenberger (Germany) Nils Langer	(Germany) Tom Schönenberg (Germany) Marco Lenz (Austria) Bastian Trinker (Germany) Dieter Kindlmann
August 22	Germany F12 Futures; Überlingen, Germany; Clay $10,000	(Germany) Dennis Blömke (Germany) Luis Rattenhuber; 6–3, 6–1	(Switzerland) Antoine Plumey (Switzerland) Lucas Zweili	(Switzerland) Raphael Lustenberger (Germany) Nils Langer	(Germany) Tom Schönenberg (Germany) Marco Lenz (Austria) Bastian Trinker (Germany) Dieter Kindlmann
August 22	Italy F24 Futures; Piombino, Italy; Hard $15,000	(Italy) Luca Vanni; 6–3, 6–2	(France) Josselin Ouanna	(Italy) Massimo Capone (Germany) Stefan Seifert	(Italy) Manuel Jorquera (France) Rudy Coco (Italy) Andrea Agazzi (France) Kevin Botti
August 22	Italy F24 Futures; Piombino, Italy; Hard $15,000	(Italy) Enrico Iannuzzi (Italy) Luca Vanni; 6–4, 2–6, [10–4]	(France) Simon Cauvard (Italy) Matteo Volante	(Italy) Massimo Capone (Germany) Stefan Seifert	(Italy) Manuel Jorquera (France) Rudy Coco (Italy) Andrea Agazzi (France) Kevin Botti
August 22	Mexico F9 Futures; Tijuana, Mexico; Hard $10,000	(Mexico) Miguel Gallardo-Vallés; 6–3, 3–6, 6–4	(Australia) Chris Letcher	(United States) Adam El Mihdawy (Uruguay) Marcel Felder	(Mexico) Daniel Garza (El Salvador) Marcelo Arévalo (Barbados) Darian King (Trinidad and Tobago) Joseph Cadogan
August 22	Mexico F9 Futures; Tijuana, Mexico; Hard $10,000	(Uruguay) Marcel Felder (Mexico) Daniel Garza; 7–5, 7–6^{(7–4)}	(El Salvador) Marcelo Arévalo (Australia) Robert McKenzie	(United States) Adam El Mihdawy (Uruguay) Marcel Felder	(Mexico) Daniel Garza (El Salvador) Marcelo Arévalo (Barbados) Darian King (Trinidad and Tobago) Joseph Cadogan
August 22	Netherlands F5 Futures; Enschede, Netherlands; Clay $15,000	(Netherlands) Antal van der Duim; 4–6, 6–4, 6–3	(France) Nicolas Devilder	(France) Jonathan Eysseric (France) Gianni Mina	(Germany) Florian Stephan (France) Laurent Rochette (France) Julien Obry (Netherlands) Stephan Fransen
August 22	Netherlands F5 Futures; Enschede, Netherlands; Clay $15,000	(Netherlands) Stephan Fransen (Netherlands) Wesley Koolhof; 6–3, 7–5	(Germany) Michel Dornbusch (Germany) Mattis Wetzel	(France) Jonathan Eysseric (France) Gianni Mina	(Germany) Florian Stephan (France) Laurent Rochette (France) Julien Obry (Netherlands) Stephan Fransen
August 22	Peru F3 Futures; Trujillo, Peru; Clay $10,000	(Argentina) Agustín Velotti; 6–2, 6–4	(Peru) Duilio Beretta	(Chile) Cristóbal Saavedra Corvalán (Argentina) Guido Pella	(Venezuela) Román Recarte (Uruguay) Martín Cuevas (Peru) Mauricio Echazú (Chile) Nicolás Gustavo Kauer
August 22	Peru F3 Futures; Trujillo, Peru; Clay $10,000	(Argentina) Joaquín-Jésus Monteferrario (Argentina) Agustín Velotti; 2–6, 6–4, [10–8]	(Venezuela) Luis David Martínez (Chile) Cristóbal Saavedra Corvalán	(Chile) Cristóbal Saavedra Corvalán (Argentina) Guido Pella	(Venezuela) Román Recarte (Uruguay) Martín Cuevas (Peru) Mauricio Echazú (Chile) Nicolás Gustavo Kauer
August 22	Poland F7 Futures; Poznań, Poland; Clay $15,000	(Spain) Javier Martí; 6–3, 6–4	(Germany) Peter Torebko	(Poland) Grzegorz Panfil (Czech Republic) Michal Schmid	(Belarus) Andrei Vasilevski (Latvia) Deniss Pavlovs (Latvia) Andis Juška (Belarus) Dzmitry Zhyrmont
August 22	Poland F7 Futures; Poznań, Poland; Clay $15,000	(Spain) Óscar Burrieza (Spain) Javier Martí; 4–6, 6–3, [10–6]	(Poland) Adam Chadaj (Poland) Andriej Kapaś	(Poland) Grzegorz Panfil (Czech Republic) Michal Schmid	(Belarus) Andrei Vasilevski (Latvia) Deniss Pavlovs (Latvia) Andis Juška (Belarus) Dzmitry Zhyrmont
August 22	Romania F8 Futures; Cluj-Napoca, Romania; Clay $15,000	(Australia) Matt Reid; 1–6, 6–3, 6–0	(Romania) Gabriel Moraru	(Romania) Robert Coman (Romania) Andrei Mlendea	(Romania) Teodor-Dacian Crăciun (Romania) Răzvan Sabău (Romania) Petru-Alexandru Luncanu (Romania) Darius Florin Brăguși
August 22	Romania F8 Futures; Cluj-Napoca, Romania; Clay $15,000	(Romania) Victor Anagnastopol (Romania) Florin Mergea; 6–3, 5–7, [10–1]	(Malaysia) Mohd Assri Merzuki (Romania) Gabriel Moraru	(Romania) Robert Coman (Romania) Andrei Mlendea	(Romania) Teodor-Dacian Crăciun (Romania) Răzvan Sabău (Romania) Petru-Alexandru Luncanu (Romania) Darius Florin Brăguși
August 22	Russia F7 Futures; Lermontov, Russia; Clay $10,000	(Russia) Andrey Kumantsov; 7–5, 6–4	(Russia) Richard Muzaev	(Russia) Vitali Reshetnikov (Russia) Mikhail Fufygin	(Russia) Sergei Krotiouk (Russia) Artem Ilyushin (Russia) Yury Vaschenko (Russia) Stanislav Vovk
August 22	Russia F7 Futures; Lermontov, Russia; Clay $10,000	(Russia) Mikhail Fufygin (Russia) Vitali Reshetnikov; 6–2, 6–3	(Ukraine) Gleb Alekseenko (Russia) Ilia Shatskiy	(Russia) Vitali Reshetnikov (Russia) Mikhail Fufygin	(Russia) Sergei Krotiouk (Russia) Artem Ilyushin (Russia) Yury Vaschenko (Russia) Stanislav Vovk
August 22	Serbia F8 Futures; Novi Sad, Serbia; Clay $10,000	(Serbia) Ivan Bjelica; 7–6^{(7–3)}, 6–2	(Montenegro) Goran Tošić	(Slovenia) Aljaž Bedene (Italy) Marco Cecchinato	(Bulgaria) Dimitar Kuzmanov (Serbia) Marko Rajić (Serbia) Arsenije Zlatanović (Serbia) Miljan Zekić
August 22	Serbia F8 Futures; Novi Sad, Serbia; Clay $10,000	(Italy) Marco Cecchinato (Italy) Matteo Civarolo; 6–3, 6–1	(Montenegro) Marko Begović (France) Jérémy Tweedt	(Slovenia) Aljaž Bedene (Italy) Marco Cecchinato	(Bulgaria) Dimitar Kuzmanov (Serbia) Marko Rajić (Serbia) Arsenije Zlatanović (Serbia) Miljan Zekić
August 22	Spain F30 Futures; Ourense, Spain; Hard $10,000	(Spain) Miguel Ángel López Jaén; 6–3, 6–2	(Spain) Iván Arenas-Gualda	(Spain) Roberto Ortega Olmedo (Venezuela) Ricardo Rodríguez	(Spain) Andrés Artuñedo (Spain) Pablo Martín-Adalia (Spain) Rafael Mazón-Hernández (Spain) Carles Poch Gradin
August 22	Spain F30 Futures; Ourense, Spain; Hard $10,000	(Spain) Jaime Pulgar-García (Bolivia) Federico Zeballos; 7–5, 5–7, [10–8]	(Spain) Miguel Ángel López Jaén (Spain) David Pérez Sanz	(Spain) Roberto Ortega Olmedo (Venezuela) Ricardo Rodríguez	(Spain) Andrés Artuñedo (Spain) Pablo Martín-Adalia (Spain) Rafael Mazón-Hernández (Spain) Carles Poch Gradin
August 29	Argentina F13 Futures; Rio Negro, Argentina; Clay $10,000	(Argentina) Patricio Heras; 6–7^{(9–11)}, 6–3, 6–3	(Argentina) Juan-Manuel Valverde	(Argentina) Juan-Pablo Villar (Argentina) Gabriel Alejandro Hidalgo	(Argentina) Alejandro Fabbri (Argentina) Gustavo Sterin (Argentina) Hernán Casanova (Italy) Giorgio Portaluri
August 29	Argentina F13 Futures; Rio Negro, Argentina; Clay $10,000	(Italy) Giammarco Micolani (Argentina) Juan-Pablo Villar; 6–1, 6–0	(Argentina) Joaquín-Jésus Monteferrario (Argentina) Juan-Manuel Romanazzi	(Argentina) Juan-Pablo Villar (Argentina) Gabriel Alejandro Hidalgo	(Argentina) Alejandro Fabbri (Argentina) Gustavo Sterin (Argentina) Hernán Casanova (Italy) Giorgio Portaluri
August 29	Austria F8 Futures; Sankt Pölten, Austria; Clay $10,000	(Austria) Max Raditschnigg; 6–3, 6–4	(Germany) Marc Sieber	(Austria) Tristan-Samuel Weissborn (Bulgaria) Tihomir Grozdanov	(Italy) Lorenzo Giustino (Austria) Mario Haider-Maurer (Slovakia) Michal Pažický (Czech Republic) Robert Rumler
August 29	Austria F8 Futures; Sankt Pölten, Austria; Clay $10,000	(Austria) Maximilian Neuchrist (Austria) Tristan-Samuel Weissborn; 7–5, 5–7, [11–9]	(Czech Republic) Roman Jebavý (Slovakia) Michal Pažický	(Austria) Tristan-Samuel Weissborn (Bulgaria) Tihomir Grozdanov	(Italy) Lorenzo Giustino (Austria) Mario Haider-Maurer (Slovakia) Michal Pažický (Czech Republic) Robert Rumler
August 29	Colombia F5 Futures; Bogotá, Colombia; Clay $15,000	(Colombia) Alejandro González; 5–7, 6–4, 6–2	(Colombia) Carlos Salamanca	(Brazil) Raony Carvalho (New Zealand) Artem Sitak	(Brazil) Ricardo Siggia (Colombia) Eduardo Struvay (Chile) Guillermo Rivera Aránguiz (Ecuador) Julio César Campozano
August 29	Colombia F5 Futures; Bogotá, Colombia; Clay $15,000	(United States) Maciek Sykut (United States) Denis Zivkovic; 7–5, 6–7^{(7–9)}, [10–6]	(Ecuador) Julio César Campozano (Ecuador) Iván Endara	(Brazil) Raony Carvalho (New Zealand) Artem Sitak	(Brazil) Ricardo Siggia (Colombia) Eduardo Struvay (Chile) Guillermo Rivera Aránguiz (Ecuador) Julio César Campozano
August 29	Croatia F8 Futures; Osijek, Croatia; Clay $10,000	(Bosnia and Herzegovina) Damir Džumhur; 6–1, 6–4	(Croatia) Mislav Hižak	(Bosnia and Herzegovina) Aldin Šetkić (Croatia) Dino Marcan	(Croatia) Mate Pavić (Czech Republic) Adam Vejmělka (Bosnia and Herzegovina) Tomislav Brkić (Croatia) Josko Topić
August 29	Croatia F8 Futures; Osijek, Croatia; Clay $10,000	(Bosnia and Herzegovina) Damir Džumhur (Croatia) Mate Pavić; 6–4, 3–6, [10–5]	(Croatia) Marin Draganja (Croatia) Dino Marcan	(Bosnia and Herzegovina) Aldin Šetkić (Croatia) Dino Marcan	(Croatia) Mate Pavić (Czech Republic) Adam Vejmělka (Bosnia and Herzegovina) Tomislav Brkić (Croatia) Josko Topić
August 29	Germany F13 Futures; Kempten, Germany; Clay $10,000	(Germany) Marcel Zimmermann; 6–2, 6–2	(Chile) Hans Podlipnik Castillo	(Chile) Jorge Aguilar (France) Pierre-Hugues Herbert	(India) Sriram Balaji (Germany) Richard Waite (Germany) Andre Wiesler (Germany) Steven Moneke
August 29	Germany F13 Futures; Kempten, Germany; Clay $10,000	(Germany) Steven Moneke (Germany) Tim Pütz; 6–2, 6–3	(Germany) Andre Wiesler (Germany) Marcel Zimmermann	(Chile) Jorge Aguilar (France) Pierre-Hugues Herbert	(India) Sriram Balaji (Germany) Richard Waite (Germany) Andre Wiesler (Germany) Steven Moneke
August 29	Great Britain F13 Futures; Wrexham, Great Britain; Hard $10,000	(United Kingdom) Joshua Goodall; 6–1, 6–2	(United Kingdom) Sean Thornley´	(France) Albano Olivetti (United Kingdom) Andrew Fitzpatrick	(Republic of Ireland) Sam Barry (United Kingdom) Marcus Willis (United Kingdom) David Rice (France) Rudy Coco
August 29	Great Britain F13 Futures; Wrexham, Great Britain; Hard $10,000	(United Kingdom) David Rice (United Kingdom) Sean Thornley; 6–2, 7–5	(United Kingdom) James Feaver (Republic of Ireland) Daniel Glancy	(France) Albano Olivetti (United Kingdom) Andrew Fitzpatrick	(Republic of Ireland) Sam Barry (United Kingdom) Marcus Willis (United Kingdom) David Rice (France) Rudy Coco
August 29	Israel F7 Futures; Acre, Israel; Hard $10,000	(Germany) Stefan Seifert; 6–1, 5–7, 6–2	(Ukraine) Stanislav Poplavskyy	(South Africa) Ruan Roelofse (Italy) Erik Crepaldi	(Italy) Claudio Grassi (Australia) Blake Mott (Sweden) Carl Bergman (Sweden) Lucas Renard
August 29	Israel F7 Futures; Acre, Israel; Hard $10,000	(South Africa) Ruan Roelofse (Russia) Mikhail Vasiliev; 6–3, 6–3	(Italy) Erik Crepaldi (Italy) Claudio Grassi	(South Africa) Ruan Roelofse (Italy) Erik Crepaldi	(Italy) Claudio Grassi (Australia) Blake Mott (Sweden) Carl Bergman (Sweden) Lucas Renard
August 29	Italy F25 Futures; Trieste, Italy; Clay $10,000	(Italy) Matteo Marrai; 6–4, 6–4	(Italy) Riccardo Sinicropi	(Italy) Filippo Leonardi (Italy) Luca Vanni	(Brazil) Daniel Dutra da Silva (Italy) Massimo Capone (Spain) Óscar Sabate-Bretos (Spain) José Checa Calvo
August 29	Italy F25 Futures; Trieste, Italy; Clay $10,000	(Philippines) Ruben Gonzales (United States) Chris Kwon; 6–4, 7–5	(Spain) Óscar Sabate-Bretos (Brazil) Daniel Dutra da Silva	(Italy) Filippo Leonardi (Italy) Luca Vanni	(Brazil) Daniel Dutra da Silva (Italy) Massimo Capone (Spain) Óscar Sabate-Bretos (Spain) José Checa Calvo
August 29	Mexico F10 Futures; Zacatecas, Mexico; Hard $10,000	(Mexico) César Ramírez; 6–3, 6–3	(Bulgaria) Boris Nicola Bakalov	(Uruguay) Marcel Felder (Guatemala) Christopher Díaz Figueroa	(El Salvador) Marcelo Arévalo (New Zealand) Marvin Barker (Barbados) Darian King (Australia) Robert McKenzie
August 29	Mexico F10 Futures; Zacatecas, Mexico; Hard $10,000	(El Salvador) Marcelo Arévalo (Mexico) César Ramírez; 6–3, 6–2	(Guatemala) Christopher Díaz Figueroa (Guatemala) Sebastien Vidal	(Uruguay) Marcel Felder (Guatemala) Christopher Díaz Figueroa	(El Salvador) Marcelo Arévalo (New Zealand) Marvin Barker (Barbados) Darian King (Australia) Robert McKenzie
August 29	Netherlands F6 Futures; Apeldoorn, Netherlands; Clay $15,000	(France) Julien Obry; 3–6, 7–6^{(7–5)}, 6–3	(Netherlands) Boy Westerhof	(France) Alexandre Sidorenko (Netherlands) Antal van der Duim	(Netherlands) Wesley Koolhof (Russia) Philip Davydenko (France) Nicolas Devilder (Czech Republic) Jan Mertl
August 29	Netherlands F6 Futures; Apeldoorn, Netherlands; Clay $15,000	(Chile) Rodrigo Pérez (Ecuador) Juan Sebastián Vivanco; 7–5, 2–6, [10–7]	(France) Laurent Rochette (France) Alexandre Sidorenko	(France) Alexandre Sidorenko (Netherlands) Antal van der Duim	(Netherlands) Wesley Koolhof (Russia) Philip Davydenko (France) Nicolas Devilder (Czech Republic) Jan Mertl
August 29	Poland F8 Futures; Sobota, Poland; Clay $15,000	(Germany) Peter Torebko; 6–3, 3–6, 6–1	(Spain) Javier Martí	(Poland) Marcin Gawron (Russia) Andrey Kuznetsov	(Poland) Jerzy Janowicz (Poland) Grzegorz Panfil (Poland) Andriej Kapaś (Poland) Maciej Romanowicz
August 29	Poland F8 Futures; Sobota, Poland; Clay $15,000	(Poland) Adam Chadaj (Poland) Andriej Kapaś; 7–5, 6–4	(Belarus) Aliaksandr Bury (Belarus) Andrei Vasilevski	(Poland) Marcin Gawron (Russia) Andrey Kuznetsov	(Poland) Jerzy Janowicz (Poland) Grzegorz Panfil (Poland) Andriej Kapaś (Poland) Maciej Romanowicz
August 29	Romania F9 Futures; Brașov, Romania; Clay $10,000	(Romania) Teodor-Dacian Crăciun; 6–4, 1–6, 6–3	(Romania) Răzvan Sabău	(Romania) Adrian Cruciat (Romania) Robert Coman	(Romania) Gabriel Moraru (United Kingdom) Morgan Phillips (Germany) Richard Becker (Romania) Andrei Savulescu
August 29	Romania F9 Futures; Brașov, Romania; Clay $10,000	(Romania) Teodor-Dacian Crăciun (Romania) Adrian Cruciat; 6–0, 3–6, [10–7]	(Moldova) Radu Albot (Moldova) Andrei Ciumac	(Romania) Adrian Cruciat (Romania) Robert Coman	(Romania) Gabriel Moraru (United Kingdom) Morgan Phillips (Germany) Richard Becker (Romania) Andrei Savulescu
August 29	Russia F8 Futures; Vsevolozhsk, Russia; Clay $10,000	(Russia) Andrey Kumantsov; 6–4, 5–2 ret.	(Russia) Mikhail Elgin	(Russia) Alexander Rumyantsev (Russia) Alexander Pavlioutchenkov	(Russia) Sergei Krotiouk (Russia) Mikhail Biryukov (Russia) Vladislav Dubinsky (Estonia) Vladimir Ivanov
August 29	Russia F8 Futures; Vsevolozhsk, Russia; Clay $10,000	(Russia) Mikhail Fufygin (Russia) Andrei Levine; 6–2, 6–3	(Russia) Vitaliy Kachanovskiy (Russia) Sergei Krotiouk	(Russia) Alexander Rumyantsev (Russia) Alexander Pavlioutchenkov	(Russia) Sergei Krotiouk (Russia) Mikhail Biryukov (Russia) Vladislav Dubinsky (Estonia) Vladimir Ivanov
August 29	Serbia F9 Futures; Novi Sad, Serbia; Clay $10,000	(Bosnia and Herzegovina) Mirza Bašić; 7–6^{(8–6)}, 6–3	(Italy) Edoardo Eremin	(Australia) Dane Propoggia (Serbia) Nikola Ćaćić	(Serbia) Ivan Bjelica (Serbia) Arsenije Zlatanović (Serbia) Danilo Petrović (Italy) Marco Cecchinato
August 29	Serbia F9 Futures; Novi Sad, Serbia; Clay $10,000	(Mexico) Javier Herrera-Eguiluz (Australia) Marious Zelba; 4–6, 7–6^{(7–5)}, [10–8]	(Serbia) Danilo Petrović (Serbia) Bojan Zdravković	(Australia) Dane Propoggia (Serbia) Nikola Ćaćić	(Serbia) Ivan Bjelica (Serbia) Arsenije Zlatanović (Serbia) Danilo Petrović (Italy) Marco Cecchinato
August 29	Spain F31 Futures; Santander, Spain; Clay $15,000	(Spain) Gerard Granollers Pujol; 7–6^{(7–5)}, 4–6, 7–6^{(7–1)}	(Germany) Alexander Flock	(Spain) Gabriel Trujillo Soler (Spain) Roberto Carballés	(Spain) David Estruch (Spain) Miguel Ángel López Jaén (Spain) Marc Giner (Spain) Marc García-Román
August 29	Spain F31 Futures; Santander, Spain; Clay $15,000	(Spain) Juan Lizariturry (Spain) Pablo Martín-Adalia; 4–6, 6–3, [10–8]	(Spain) Miguel Ángel López Jaén (Spain) Gabriel Trujillo Soler	(Spain) Gabriel Trujillo Soler (Spain) Roberto Carballés	(Spain) David Estruch (Spain) Miguel Ángel López Jaén (Spain) Marc Giner (Spain) Marc García-Román

== September ==
Week of	Tournament	Winner	Runners-up	Semifinalists	Quarterfinalists
September 5	Argentina F14 Futures; Mar del Plata, Argentina; Clay $10,000	(Argentina) Juan-Martín Aranguren; 6–3, 1–6, 6–4	(Argentina) Pablo Galdón	(Argentina) Juan-Pablo Villar (United States) Andrea Collarini	(Argentina) Guillermo Carry (Peru) Sergio Galdós (Argentina) Patricio Heras (Argentina) Juan-Pablo Amado
September 5	Argentina F14 Futures; Mar del Plata, Argentina; Clay $10,000	(Argentina) Guillermo Bujniewicz (Argentina) Guillermo Carry; 4–6, 6–4, [10–8]	(Argentina) Patricio Heras (Argentina) Santiago Maccio	(Argentina) Juan-Pablo Villar (United States) Andrea Collarini	(Argentina) Guillermo Carry (Peru) Sergio Galdós (Argentina) Patricio Heras (Argentina) Juan-Pablo Amado
September 5	Australia F5 Futures; Alice Springs, Australia; Hard $15,000	(Australia) Michael Look; 6–4, 6–4	(Australia) Benjamin Mitchell	(Australia) James Lemke (Australia) Matt Reid	(Australia) Matthew Barton (United States) Nicolas Meister (Australia) Isaac Frost (Australia) Brendan Moore
September 5	Australia F5 Futures; Alice Springs, Australia; Hard $15,000	(Australia) Brydan Klein (Australia) James Lemke; 6–1, 6–1	(China) Gao Peng (China) Gao Wan	(Australia) James Lemke (Australia) Matt Reid	(Australia) Matthew Barton (United States) Nicolas Meister (Australia) Isaac Frost (Australia) Brendan Moore
September 5	Brazil F29 Futures; Arapongas, Brazil; Clay $10,000	(Argentina) Juan-Manuel Valverde; 6–4, 6–3	(Brazil) Fabrício Neis	(Brazil) José Pereira (Brazil) André Miele	(Brazil) Eduardo Dischinger (Brazil) Diego Matos (Brazil) Raúl Francisquiny (Brazil) Bruno Semenzato
September 5	Brazil F29 Futures; Arapongas, Brazil; Clay $10,000	(Brazil) José Pereira (Brazil) Bruno Semenzato; 6–3, 7–5	(Brazil) Diego Matos (Brazil) Nicolás Santos	(Brazil) José Pereira (Brazil) André Miele	(Brazil) Eduardo Dischinger (Brazil) Diego Matos (Brazil) Raúl Francisquiny (Brazil) Bruno Semenzato
September 5	Canada F5 Futures; Toronto, Canada; Clay $15,000	(United States) Jesse Levine; 6–2, 6–2	(United States) Jordan Cox	(United States) Tennys Sandgren (Canada) Peter Polansky	(United States) Adam El Mihdawy (United States) Daniel Stahl (Canada) Milan Pokrajac (United States) Denis Zivkovic
September 5	Canada F5 Futures; Toronto, Canada; Clay $15,000	(United States) Maciek Sykut (United States) Denis Zivkovic; 6–2, 6–1	(United States) Sekou Bangoura (Barbados) Darian King	(United States) Tennys Sandgren (Canada) Peter Polansky	(United States) Adam El Mihdawy (United States) Daniel Stahl (Canada) Milan Pokrajac (United States) Denis Zivkovic
September 5	France F13 Futures; Bagnères-de-Bigorre, France; Hard $15,000+H	(France) Mathieu Rodrigues; 6–4, 5–7, 6–2	(France) Alexandre Sidorenko	(France) Michael Bois (France) Charles-Antoine Brézac	(France) Kevin Botti (France) Tristan Lamasine (Russia) Andrey Kumantsov (Italy) Federico Gaio
September 5	France F13 Futures; Bagnères-de-Bigorre, France; Hard $15,000+H	(France) Charles-Antoine Brézac (France) Albano Olivetti; 7–5, 6–3	(Brazil) Caio Silva (Moldova) Roman Tudoreanu	(France) Michael Bois (France) Charles-Antoine Brézac	(France) Kevin Botti (France) Tristan Lamasine (Russia) Andrey Kumantsov (Italy) Federico Gaio
September 5	Germany F14 Futures; Kenn, Germany; Clay $10,000	(Germany) Marc Sieber; 6–4, 6–2	(Germany) Michel Dornbusch	(France) Jérôme Inzerillo (Ecuador) Juan Sebastián Vivanco	(Germany) Dennis Blömke (Germany) Matthias Kolbe (Germany) Steven Moneke (Germany) Ralph Regus
September 5	Germany F14 Futures; Kenn, Germany; Clay $10,000	(Germany) Matthias Kolbe (Germany) Steven Moneke; 6–3, 7–5	(Germany) Maximilian Dinslaken (Germany) Michel Dornbusch	(France) Jérôme Inzerillo (Ecuador) Juan Sebastián Vivanco	(Germany) Dennis Blömke (Germany) Matthias Kolbe (Germany) Steven Moneke (Germany) Ralph Regus
September 5	Great Britain F14 Futures; Roehampton, Great Britain; Hard $10,000	(United Kingdom) Joshua Goodall; 7–6^{(7–4)}, 6–2	(United Kingdom) Richard Bloomfield	(France) Nicolas Rosenzweig (United Kingdom) Lewis Burton	(United Kingdom) Andrew Fitzpatrick (Italy) Alessandro Bega (United Kingdom) Ashley Hewitt (Republic of Ireland) Sam Barry
September 5	Great Britain F14 Futures; Roehampton, Great Britain; Hard $10,000	(United Kingdom) Joshua Goodall (United Kingdom) Marcus Willis; 6–3, 5–7, [10–5]	(United Kingdom) Lewis Burton (United Kingdom) James Marsalek	(France) Nicolas Rosenzweig (United Kingdom) Lewis Burton	(United Kingdom) Andrew Fitzpatrick (Italy) Alessandro Bega (United Kingdom) Ashley Hewitt (Republic of Ireland) Sam Barry
September 5	Israel F8 Futures; Haifa, Israel; Hard $10,000	(Sweden) Carl Bergman; 7–6^{(11–9)}, 6–3	(Germany) Stefan Seifert	(Italy) Claudio Grassi (Italy) Erik Crepaldi	(Russia) Vitali Reshetnikov (South Africa) Ruan Roelofse (Ukraine) Stanislav Poplavskyy (Israel) Saar Steele
September 5	Israel F8 Futures; Haifa, Israel; Hard $10,000	(Italy) Erik Crepaldi (Italy) Claudio Grassi; 6–4, 6–4	(Israel) Igor Smilansky (Israel) Saar Steele	(Italy) Claudio Grassi (Italy) Erik Crepaldi	(Russia) Vitali Reshetnikov (South Africa) Ruan Roelofse (Ukraine) Stanislav Poplavskyy (Israel) Saar Steele
September 5	Italy F26 Futures; Siena, Italy; Clay $10,000	(Italy) Riccardo Bellotti; 6–3, 6–0	(Italy) Marco Viola	(Italy) Manuel Jorquera (Italy) Enrico Fioravante	(Italy) Luca Vanni (Italy) Antonio Comporto (Italy) Filippo Leonardi (Italy) Marco Cecchinato
September 5	Italy F26 Futures; Siena, Italy; Clay $10,000	(Philippines) Ruben Gonzales (United States) Chris Kwon; 6–4, 6–3	(Italy) Francesco Borgo (Australia) Dane Propoggia	(Italy) Manuel Jorquera (Italy) Enrico Fioravante	(Italy) Luca Vanni (Italy) Antonio Comporto (Italy) Filippo Leonardi (Italy) Marco Cecchinato
September 5	Poland F9 Futures; Legnica, Poland; Clay $10,000	(Poland) Grzegorz Panfil; 6–3, 6–3	(Poland) Piotr Gadomski	(Slovakia) Michal Pažický (Poland) Mikołaj Szmyrgała	(Poland) Andriej Kapaś (Poland) Adam Chadaj (Sweden) Patrik Brydolf (Poland) Igor Bujdo
September 5	Poland F9 Futures; Legnica, Poland; Clay $10,000	(Czech Republic) Roman Jebavý (Slovakia) Adrian Sikora; 6–3, 6–1	(Poland) Aleksander Charpantidis (Poland) Marek Pokrywka	(Slovakia) Michal Pažický (Poland) Mikołaj Szmyrgała	(Poland) Andriej Kapaś (Poland) Adam Chadaj (Sweden) Patrik Brydolf (Poland) Igor Bujdo
September 5	Serbia F10 Futures; Zlatibor, Serbia; Clay $10,000	(Serbia) Ivan Bjelica; 7–5, 6–2	(Serbia) Danilo Petrović	(Montenegro) Goran Tošić (Croatia) Duje Kekež	(Serbia) Miki Janković (Serbia) Arsenije Zlatanović (France) Gleb Sakharov (Serbia) Denis Bejtulahi
September 5	Serbia F10 Futures; Zlatibor, Serbia; Clay $10,000	(Croatia) Duje Kekež (Bosnia and Herzegovina) Franjo Raspudić; 6–4, 7–6^{(7–4)}	(Serbia) Danilo Petrović (Serbia) Bojan Zdravković	(Montenegro) Goran Tošić (Croatia) Duje Kekež	(Serbia) Miki Janković (Serbia) Arsenije Zlatanović (France) Gleb Sakharov (Serbia) Denis Bejtulahi
September 5	Spain F32 Futures; Oviedo, Spain; Clay $15,000	(Russia) Andrey Kuznetsov; 7–5, 6–1	(Japan) Taro Daniel	(Russia) Ilya Belyaev (Spain) Marcos Esparcia Omedas	(Spain) Jordi Samper Montaña (Spain) Oriol Roca Batalla (Spain) José Checa Calvo (Spain) Carles Poch Gradin
September 5	Spain F32 Futures; Oviedo, Spain; Clay $15,000	(Spain) Miguel Ángel López Jaén (Spain) Carles Poch Gradin; 4–6, 6–3, [10–7]	(Portugal) Gonçalo Falcão (Netherlands) Mark Vervoort	(Russia) Ilya Belyaev (Spain) Marcos Esparcia Omedas	(Spain) Jordi Samper Montaña (Spain) Oriol Roca Batalla (Spain) José Checa Calvo (Spain) Carles Poch Gradin
September 12	Argentina F15 Futures; Dolores, Argentina; Clay $10,000	(United States) Andrea Collarini; 6–4, 6–2	(Argentina) Gastón-Arturo Grimolizzi	(Argentina) Patricio Heras (Argentina) Juan-Martín Aranguren	(Argentina) Juan Vázquez-Valenzuela (Argentina) Guillermo Bujniewicz (Argentina) Gustavo Sterin (Argentina) Tomas Buchhass
September 12	Argentina F15 Futures; Dolores, Argentina; Clay $10,000	(Argentina) Patricio Heras (Argentina) Gustavo Sterin; 6–2, 6–2	(Argentina) Santiago Maccio (Argentina) Juan Vázquez-Valenzuela	(Argentina) Patricio Heras (Argentina) Juan-Martín Aranguren	(Argentina) Juan Vázquez-Valenzuela (Argentina) Guillermo Bujniewicz (Argentina) Gustavo Sterin (Argentina) Tomas Buchhass
September 12	Australia F6 Futures; Cairns, Australia; Hard $15,000	(Australia) James Lemke; 6–1, 4–6, 6–3	(Australia) Benjamin Mitchell	(Australia) Isaac Frost (Japan) Yasutaka Uchiyama	(Australia) Nick Lindahl (South Korea) An Jae-sung (Australia) Matt Reid (Japan) Takao Suzuki
September 12	Australia F6 Futures; Cairns, Australia; Hard $15,000	(Australia) Brydan Klein (Australia) James Lemke walkover	(South Korea) An Jae-sung (Indonesia) Elbert Sie	(Australia) Isaac Frost (Japan) Yasutaka Uchiyama	(Australia) Nick Lindahl (South Korea) An Jae-sung (Australia) Matt Reid (Japan) Takao Suzuki
September 12	Brazil F30 Futures; Belém, Brazil; Hard $15,000+H	(Brazil) Leonardo Kirche; 1–6, 6–2, 6–1	(Brazil) Tiago Lopes	(Brazil) José Pereira (Brazil) Thales Turini	(Brazil) Pedro Sakamoto (Argentina) Juan-Manuel Valverde (Brazil) Wilson Leite (Argentina) Maximiliano Estévez
September 12	Brazil F30 Futures; Belém, Brazil; Hard $15,000+H	(Argentina) Maximiliano Estévez (Brazil) Leonardo Kirche; 7–6^{(7–2)}, 6–3	(Brazil) Tiago Lopes (Brazil) Diego Matos	(Brazil) José Pereira (Brazil) Thales Turini	(Brazil) Pedro Sakamoto (Argentina) Juan-Manuel Valverde (Brazil) Wilson Leite (Argentina) Maximiliano Estévez
September 12	Canada F6 Futures; Toronto, Canada; Hard $15,000	(United States) Jesse Levine; 6–1, 6–0	(United States) Rhyne Williams	(Moldova) Roman Borvanov (Netherlands) Miliaan Niesten	(United States) Maciek Sykut (United States) Tennys Sandgren (France) Xavier Audouy (Canada) Milan Pokrajac
September 12	Canada F6 Futures; Toronto, Canada; Hard $15,000	(United States) Tennys Sandgren (United States) Rhyne Williams; 6–1, 6–3	(United States) Chase Buchanan (United States) Joffrey de Schepper	(Moldova) Roman Borvanov (Netherlands) Miliaan Niesten	(United States) Maciek Sykut (United States) Tennys Sandgren (France) Xavier Audouy (Canada) Milan Pokrajac
September 12	France F14 Futures; Mulhouse, France; Hard (indoor) $15,000+H	(France) Pierre-Hugues Herbert; 6–4, 6–4	(France) Josselin Ouanna	(France) Vincent Millot (France) Albano Olivetti	(France) Joffrey de Schepper (France) Fabrice Martin (France) Franck Pepe (Switzerland) Raphael Lustenberger
September 12	France F14 Futures; Mulhouse, France; Hard (indoor) $15,000+H	(France) Pierre-Hugues Herbert (France) Albano Olivetti; 6–3, 6–4	(Republic of Ireland) James Cluskey (France) Fabrice Martin	(France) Vincent Millot (France) Albano Olivetti	(France) Joffrey de Schepper (France) Fabrice Martin (France) Franck Pepe (Switzerland) Raphael Lustenberger
September 12	Great Britain F15 Futures; Nottingham, Great Britain; Hard $10,000	(United Kingdom) Richard Bloomfield; 6–7^{(6–8)}, 6–3, 6–4	(United Kingdom) Alexander Ward	(United Kingdom) Joshua Goodall (United Kingdom) David Rice	(France) Mathieu Rodrigues (Morocco) Mehdi Ziadi (United Kingdom) Sean Thornley (United Kingdom) Andrew Fitzpatrick
September 12	Great Britain F15 Futures; Nottingham, Great Britain; Hard $10,000	(United Kingdom) Joshua Goodall (United Kingdom) Marcus Willis; 6–4, 7–6^{(8–6)}	(United Kingdom) David Rice (United Kingdom) Sean Thornley	(United Kingdom) Joshua Goodall (United Kingdom) David Rice	(France) Mathieu Rodrigues (Morocco) Mehdi Ziadi (United Kingdom) Sean Thornley (United Kingdom) Andrew Fitzpatrick
September 12	Hungary F1 Futures; Budapest, Hungary; Clay $10,000	(Netherlands) Boy Westerhof; 6–1, 6–4	(Chile) Hans Podlipnik Castillo	(Italy) Giulio Torroni (Hungary) Dénes Lukács	(France) François-Arthur Vibert (Italy) Riccardo Bellotti (Austria) Marc Rath (Germany) Ivo Mijić
September 12	Hungary F1 Futures; Budapest, Hungary; Clay $10,000	(Chile) Hans Podlipnik Castillo (Austria) Marc Rath; 2–6, 6–4, [10–3]	(Hungary) Levente Gödry (Hungary) Péter Nagy	(Italy) Giulio Torroni (Hungary) Dénes Lukács	(France) François-Arthur Vibert (Italy) Riccardo Bellotti (Austria) Marc Rath (Germany) Ivo Mijić
September 12	Israel F9 Futures; Beer Sheva, Israel; Hard $10,000	(Germany) Stefan Seifert; 6–2, 6–3	(South Africa) Ruan Roelofse	(Russia) Vitali Reshetnikov (Chinese Taipei) Wang Chieh-fu	(Slovakia) Marko Daniš (New Zealand) Sebastian Lavie (Israel) Daniel Skripnik (United States) Brian Grooms
September 12	Israel F9 Futures; Beer Sheva, Israel; Hard $10,000	(Italy) Francesco Borgo (Slovakia) Marko Daniš; 6–2, 6–3	(Russia) Vitali Reshetnikov (South Africa) Ruan Roelofse	(Russia) Vitali Reshetnikov (Chinese Taipei) Wang Chieh-fu	(Slovakia) Marko Daniš (New Zealand) Sebastian Lavie (Israel) Daniel Skripnik (United States) Brian Grooms
September 12	Italy F27 Futures; Porto Torres, Italy; Hard $15,000	(Austria) Philipp Oswald; 6–3, 7–5	(Italy) Massimo Capone	(Italy) Federico Gaio (Italy) Claudio Grassi	(Italy) Stefano Mocci (Italy) Matteo Donati (Italy) Erik Crepaldi (Italy) Andrea Agazzi
September 12	Italy F27 Futures; Porto Torres, Italy; Hard $15,000	(Austria) Nikolaus Moser (Austria) Philipp Oswald; 6–4, 6–1	(Italy) Erik Crepaldi (Italy) Claudio Grassi	(Italy) Federico Gaio (Italy) Claudio Grassi	(Italy) Stefano Mocci (Italy) Matteo Donati (Italy) Erik Crepaldi (Italy) Andrea Agazzi
September 12	Serbia F11 Futures; Niš, Serbia; Clay $10,000	(France) Gleb Sakharov; 7–6^{(7–4)}, 6–1	(Croatia) Kristijan Mesaroš	(Ukraine) Vadim Alekseenko (Italy) Damiano di Ienno	(Serbia) Danilo Petrović (Japan) Takuto Niki (Austria) Maximilian Neuchrist (Serbia) Miki Janković
September 12	Serbia F11 Futures; Niš, Serbia; Clay $10,000	(France) Gleb Sakharov (Russia) Mikhail Vasiliev; 6–2, 2–6, [10–7]	(Russia) Stepan Khotulev (Japan) Takuto Niki	(Ukraine) Vadim Alekseenko (Italy) Damiano di Ienno	(Serbia) Danilo Petrović (Japan) Takuto Niki (Austria) Maximilian Neuchrist (Serbia) Miki Janković
September 12	Spain F33 Futures; Madrid, Spain; Hard $10,000	(Spain) Andrés Artuñedo; 6–2, 1–0 ret.	(Spain) José Checa Calvo	(Spain) Enrique López Pérez (Spain) David Pérez Sanz	(Spain) Roberto Ortega Olmedo (Spain) Sergio Magro Moreno (Germany) Richard Waite (France) Yanaïs Laurent
September 12	Spain F33 Futures; Madrid, Spain; Hard $10,000	(Spain) Iván Arenas-Gualda (Spain) Jaime Pulgar-García; 6–3, 6–2	(Spain) Javier Baños Pantoja (Spain) Antonio García Sánchez	(Spain) Enrique López Pérez (Spain) David Pérez Sanz	(Spain) Roberto Ortega Olmedo (Spain) Sergio Magro Moreno (Germany) Richard Waite (France) Yanaïs Laurent
September 12	Sweden F4 Futures; Uppsala, Sweden; Hard $10,000	(Switzerland) Sandro Ehrat; 7–6^{(7–1)}, 7–5	(Sweden) Carl Bergman	(United Kingdom) Lewis Burton (Sweden) Patrik Brydolf	(Sweden) Kalle Averfalk (Switzerland) Adrien Bossel (France) Yannick Jankovits (Finland) Juho Paukku
September 12	Sweden F4 Futures; Uppsala, Sweden; Hard $10,000	(Sweden) Carl Bergman (Sweden) Markus Eriksson; 6–3, 6–4	(United Kingdom) Lewis Burton (United Kingdom) James Marsalek	(United Kingdom) Lewis Burton (Sweden) Patrik Brydolf	(Sweden) Kalle Averfalk (Switzerland) Adrien Bossel (France) Yannick Jankovits (Finland) Juho Paukku
September 12	USA F23 Futures; Claremont, USA; Hard $10,000	(United States) Steve Johnson; 6–2, 6–3	(Barbados) Darian King	(Serbia) Vladimir Obradović (France) Alexandre Lacroix	(Sierra Leone) Sahr Timothy Kpulun (Czech Republic) Rudolf Siwy (United States) Dennis Novikov (Lebanon) Bassam Beidas
September 12	USA F23 Futures; Claremont, USA; Hard $10,000	(France) Alexandre Lacroix (India) Sanam Singh; 6–3, 6–1	(Serbia) Vladimir Obradović (India) Vignesh Peranamallur	(Serbia) Vladimir Obradović (France) Alexandre Lacroix	(Sierra Leone) Sahr Timothy Kpulun (Czech Republic) Rudolf Siwy (United States) Dennis Novikov (Lebanon) Bassam Beidas
September 19	Argentina F16 Futures; Santiago del Estero, Argentina; Clay $10,000	(Argentina) Juan-Pablo Amado; 6–3, 6–2	(Argentina) Gastón-Arturo Grimolizzi	(Argentina) Leandro Migani (Argentina) Juan-Martín Aranguren	(Argentina) Juan Vázquez-Valenzuela (Argentina) Alejandro Fabbri (United States) Andrea Collarini (Argentina) Jonathan Gonzalia
September 19	Argentina F16 Futures; Santiago del Estero, Argentina; Clay $10,000	(Argentina) Alejandro Fabbri (Argentina) Jonathan Gonzalia; 7–6^{(7–4)}, 6–4	(Argentina) Juan-Pablo Amado (United States) Andrea Collarini	(Argentina) Leandro Migani (Argentina) Juan-Martín Aranguren	(Argentina) Juan Vázquez-Valenzuela (Argentina) Alejandro Fabbri (United States) Andrea Collarini (Argentina) Jonathan Gonzalia
September 19	Australia F7 Futures; Darwin, Australia; Hard $15,000	(Australia) Isaac Frost; 6–1, 4–6, 6–4	(Australia) Nick Lindahl	(Australia) Alex Bolt (Japan) Yasutaka Uchiyama	(Australia) Andrew Harris (Australia) Michael Look (Australia) Brydan Klein (Australia) Benjamin Mitchell
September 19	Australia F7 Futures; Darwin, Australia; Hard $15,000	(Australia) Michael Look (United States) Nicolas Meister; 6–4, 6–4	(China) Gao Peng (China) Gao Wan	(Australia) Alex Bolt (Japan) Yasutaka Uchiyama	(Australia) Andrew Harris (Australia) Michael Look (Australia) Brydan Klein (Australia) Benjamin Mitchell
September 19	Bolivia F1 Futures; La Paz, Bolivia; Clay $10,000	(Argentina) Guillermo Carry; 6–4, 6–3	(Brazil) Augusto Laranja	(Argentina) Rodrigo Scattareggia (Argentina) Facundo Mena	(Bolivia) Hugo Dellien (Brazil) Carlos Oliveira (Bolivia) Alejandro Mendoza (Argentina) Juan Ignacio Londero
September 19	Bolivia F1 Futures; La Paz, Bolivia; Clay $10,000	(Bolivia) Boris Arias (Bolivia) Hugo Dellien; 3–6, 7–6^{(7–3)}, [10–7]	(Argentina) Juan Ignacio Londero (Argentina) Rodrigo Scattareggia	(Argentina) Rodrigo Scattareggia (Argentina) Facundo Mena	(Bolivia) Hugo Dellien (Brazil) Carlos Oliveira (Bolivia) Alejandro Mendoza (Argentina) Juan Ignacio Londero
September 19	Brazil F31 Futures; Recife, Brazil; Clay $15,000	(Brazil) Thiago Alves; 6–3, 6–2	(Brazil) Bruno Sant'Anna	(Venezuela) Luis David Martínez (Brazil) Thales Turini	(Brazil) Ricardo Siggia (Brazil) José Pereira (Brazil) Nicolás Santos (Brazil) Diego Matos
September 19	Brazil F31 Futures; Recife, Brazil; Clay $15,000	(Brazil) Raony Carvalho (Brazil) Márcio Torres; 2–6, 6–2, [10–7]	(Brazil) Tiago Lopes (Brazil) Diego Matos	(Venezuela) Luis David Martínez (Brazil) Thales Turini	(Brazil) Ricardo Siggia (Brazil) José Pereira (Brazil) Nicolás Santos (Brazil) Diego Matos
September 19	Canada F7 Futures; Markham, Canada; Hard (indoor) $15,000	(Canada) Peter Polansky; 6–4, 3–6, 7–5	(United States) Jesse Levine	(Moldova) Roman Borvanov (United States) Brian Baker	(Netherlands) Miliaan Niesten (United States) Phillip Simmonds (Canada) Filip Peliwo (United States) Nicholas Monroe
September 19	Canada F7 Futures; Markham, Canada; Hard (indoor) $15,000	(Canada) Milan Pokrajac (Canada) Peter Polansky; 4–6, 6–3, [10–8]	(United States) Tennys Sandgren (United States) Rhyne Williams	(Moldova) Roman Borvanov (United States) Brian Baker	(Netherlands) Miliaan Niesten (United States) Phillip Simmonds (Canada) Filip Peliwo (United States) Nicholas Monroe
September 19	Croatia F9 Futures; Umag, Croatia; Clay $15,000	(Belgium) Germain Gigounon; 4–6, 6–2, 6–3	(Germany) Kevin Krawietz	(Croatia) Mislav Hižak (Italy) Federico Torresi	(France) Laurent Rochette (Austria) Christian Magg (Germany) Marc Sieber (Italy) Manuel Jorquera
September 19	Croatia F9 Futures; Umag, Croatia; Clay $15,000	(Germany) Kevin Krawietz (Germany) Marcel Zimmermann; 7–6^{(12–10)}, 6–2	(Austria) Nikolaus Moser (Austria) Max Raditschnigg	(Croatia) Mislav Hižak (Italy) Federico Torresi	(France) Laurent Rochette (Austria) Christian Magg (Germany) Marc Sieber (Italy) Manuel Jorquera
September 19	France F15 Futures; Plaisir, France; Hard (indoor) $15,000+H	(Belgium) Maxime Authom; 7–6^{(7–3)}, 6–7^{(2–7)}, 6–4	(Switzerland) Adrien Bossel	(France) Maxime Forcin (France) Alexandre Sidorenko	(France) Davy Sum (France) Antoine Escoffier (France) Ludovic Walter (Russia) Alexey Vatutin
September 19	France F15 Futures; Plaisir, France; Hard (indoor) $15,000+H	(France) Alexandre Sidorenko (Brazil) Caio Silva; 6–2, 6–4	(France) Marc Auradou (France) Antoine Tassart	(France) Maxime Forcin (France) Alexandre Sidorenko	(France) Davy Sum (France) Antoine Escoffier (France) Ludovic Walter (Russia) Alexey Vatutin
September 19	Hungary F2 Futures; Budapest, Hungary; Clay $10,000	(Czech Republic) Marek Michalička; 6–3, 6–4	(Germany) Steven Moneke	(Hungary) György Balázs (Italy) Giulio Torroni	(Austria) Marc Rath (Hungary) Levente Gödry (Hungary) Adrián Szatmáry (France) François-Arthur Vibert
September 19	Hungary F2 Futures; Budapest, Hungary; Clay $10,000	(Czech Republic) Marek Michalička (Netherlands) Lennert van der Linden; 7–6^{(7–4)}, 6–4	(Germany) Matthias Kolbe (Germany) Steven Moneke	(Hungary) György Balázs (Italy) Giulio Torroni	(Austria) Marc Rath (Hungary) Levente Gödry (Hungary) Adrián Szatmáry (France) François-Arthur Vibert
September 19	Italy F28 Futures; Brusaporto, Italy; Clay $15,000	(Austria) Philipp Oswald; 4–6, 6–4, 6–3	(Italy) Luca Vanni	(Italy) Andrea Agazzi (France) Albano Olivetti	(Italy) Matteo Volante (Italy) Francesco Borgo (Italy) Giacomo Oradini (Italy) Lorenzo Frigerio
September 19	Italy F28 Futures; Brusaporto, Italy; Clay $15,000	(Italy) Enrico Iannuzzi (Italy) Luca Vanni; 6–3, 6–7^{(4–7)}, [11–9]	(Croatia) Ante Pavić (Italy) Matteo Volante	(Italy) Andrea Agazzi (France) Albano Olivetti	(Italy) Matteo Volante (Italy) Francesco Borgo (Italy) Giacomo Oradini (Italy) Lorenzo Frigerio
September 19	Mexico F11 Futures; Mazatlán, Mexico; Hard $10,000	(Mexico) Eduardo Peralta-Tello; 6–3, 6–3	(Mexico) Luis Díaz Barriga	(Guatemala) Christopher Díaz Figueroa (El Salvador) Marcelo Arévalo	(United States) Roberto Cid (Australia) Robert McKenzie (Mexico) Luis Patiño (Italy) Federico Gaio
September 19	Mexico F11 Futures; Mazatlán, Mexico; Hard $10,000	(New Zealand) Marvin Barker (Australia) Chris Letcher; 6–3, 6–2	(Mexico) Luis Díaz Barriga (United States) Chris Kwon	(Guatemala) Christopher Díaz Figueroa (El Salvador) Marcelo Arévalo	(United States) Roberto Cid (Australia) Robert McKenzie (Mexico) Luis Patiño (Italy) Federico Gaio
September 19	Portugal F4 Futures; Espinho, Portugal; Clay $15,000	(France) Julien Obry; 6–4, 2–6, 6–3	(Spain) Marc Giner	(Italy) Edoardo Eremin (Russia) Stanislav Vovk	(Spain) Pedro Clar Rosselló (France) Gianni Mina (Portugal) Leonardo Tavares (Netherlands) Antal van der Duim
September 19	Portugal F4 Futures; Espinho, Portugal; Clay $15,000	(France) Gianni Mina (France) Julien Obry; 7–6^{(7–3)}, 6–3	(Portugal) Gonçalo Falcão (Netherlands) Antal van der Duim	(Italy) Edoardo Eremin (Russia) Stanislav Vovk	(Spain) Pedro Clar Rosselló (France) Gianni Mina (Portugal) Leonardo Tavares (Netherlands) Antal van der Duim
September 19	Serbia F12 Futures; Soko Banja, Serbia; Clay $10,000	(Spain) Jordi Samper Montaña; 7–6^{(7–4)}, 6–4	(France) Gleb Sakharov	(Serbia) Saša Stojisavljević (Serbia) Ivan Bjelica	(Serbia) Miki Janković (Japan) Takuto Niki (Spain) Marc García-Román (Germany) Nico Matic
September 19	Serbia F12 Futures; Soko Banja, Serbia; Clay $10,000	(Russia) Stepan Khotulev (Japan) Takuto Niki; 7–5, 6–3	(North Macedonia) Tomislav Jotovski (North Macedonia) Stefan Micov	(Serbia) Saša Stojisavljević (Serbia) Ivan Bjelica	(Serbia) Miki Janković (Japan) Takuto Niki (Spain) Marc García-Román (Germany) Nico Matic
September 19	Spain F34 Futures; Madrid, Spain; Hard $10,000	(Spain) Andrés Artuñedo; 3–6, 6–1, 3–0, ret.	(Russia) Aleksandr Lobkov	(Spain) José Checa Calvo (Spain) Pablo Martín-Adalia	(Spain) Javier Banos Pantoja (Spain) Roberto Ortega Olmedo (Spain) Carlos Gómez-Herrera (Germany) Richard Waite
September 19	Spain F34 Futures; Madrid, Spain; Hard $10,000	(Spain) Iván Arenas-Gualda (Spain) Jaime Pulgar-García; 7–6^{(7–2)}, 6–2	(United Kingdom) Matthew Short (United Kingdom) Michael Suleau	(Spain) José Checa Calvo (Spain) Pablo Martín-Adalia	(Spain) Javier Banos Pantoja (Spain) Roberto Ortega Olmedo (Spain) Carlos Gómez-Herrera (Germany) Richard Waite
September 19	Sweden F5 Futures; Danderyd, Sweden; Hard (indoor) $10,000	(United Kingdom) George Morgan; 4–6, 6–4, 6–4	(United Kingdom) Alexander Ward	(France) Emilien Firmin (Sweden) Tobias Blömgren	(Belgium) Alban Meuffels (United Kingdom) Lewis Burton (Sweden) Pablo Figueroa (Sweden) Daniel Berta
September 19	Sweden F5 Futures; Danderyd, Sweden; Hard (indoor) $10,000	(United Kingdom) Lewis Burton (United Kingdom) George Morgan; 6–3, 6–2	(Sweden) Tobias Blömgren (Sweden) Jesper Brunström	(France) Emilien Firmin (Sweden) Tobias Blömgren	(Belgium) Alban Meuffels (United Kingdom) Lewis Burton (Sweden) Pablo Figueroa (Sweden) Daniel Berta
September 19	USA F24 Futures; Costa Mesa, USA; Hard $10,000	(United States) Steve Johnson; 6–3, 6–3	(New Zealand) Artem Sitak	(United States) Dennis Lajola (Zimbabwe) Takanyi Garanganga	(United States) Denis Kudla (Brazil) Alessandro Ventre (Australia) John-Patrick Smith (Romania) Andrei Dăescu
September 19	USA F24 Futures; Costa Mesa, USA; Hard $10,000	(United Kingdom) Chris Eaton (United Kingdom) Neal Skupski; 6–3, 6–3	(United Kingdom) Daniel Cox (Australia) Adam Hubble	(United States) Dennis Lajola (Zimbabwe) Takanyi Garanganga	(United States) Denis Kudla (Brazil) Alessandro Ventre (Australia) John-Patrick Smith (Romania) Andrei Dăescu
September 26	Argentina F17 Futures; La Rioja, Argentina; Clay $10,000	(Argentina) Gastón-Arturo Grimolizzi; 6–3, 7–6^{(9–7)}	(Argentina) Guillermo Durán	(Argentina) Juan-Pablo Villar (Argentina) Patricio Heras	(Argentina) Renzo Olivo (Argentina) Mauricio Pérez Mota (Argentina) Juan-Martín Aranguren (Argentina) Leandro Migani
September 26	Argentina F17 Futures; La Rioja, Argentina; Clay $10,000	(Argentina) Patricio Heras (Argentina) Gustavo Sterin; 7–6^{(7–5)}, 6–3	(Argentina) Guillermo Durán (Argentina) Juan-Manuel Romanazzi	(Argentina) Juan-Pablo Villar (Argentina) Patricio Heras	(Argentina) Renzo Olivo (Argentina) Mauricio Pérez Mota (Argentina) Juan-Martín Aranguren (Argentina) Leandro Migani
September 26	Bolivia F2 Futures; Cochabamba, Bolivia; Clay $10,000	(Argentina) Guido Pella; 6–4, 6–3	(Argentina) Juan Ignacio Londero	(Argentina) Gabriel Alejandro Hidalgo (Paraguay) José Benítez	(Argentina) Guillermo Carry (Bolivia) Federico Zeballos (Paraguay) Daniel-Alejandro López (Spain) Enrique López Pérez
September 26	Bolivia F2 Futures; Cochabamba, Bolivia; Clay $10,000	(Peru) Sergio Galdós (Argentina) Guido Pella; 6–3, 6–2	(Bolivia) Mauricio Doria-Medina (Bolivia) Federico Zeballos	(Argentina) Gabriel Alejandro Hidalgo (Paraguay) José Benítez	(Argentina) Guillermo Carry (Bolivia) Federico Zeballos (Paraguay) Daniel-Alejandro López (Spain) Enrique López Pérez
September 26	Croatia F10 Futures; Umag, Croatia; Clay $15,000	(Serbia) Dušan Lajović; 6–4, 0–6, 7–5	(Russia) Andrey Kuznetsov	(Slovakia) Andrej Martin (Croatia) Dino Marcan	(Slovakia) Ivo Klec (Germany) Kevin Krawietz (Croatia) Toni Androić (Croatia) Kristijan Mesaroš
September 26	Croatia F10 Futures; Umag, Croatia; Clay $15,000	(Croatia) Toni Androić (Serbia) Nikola Ćaćić; 2–6, 7–5, [10–4]	(Croatia) Marin Draganja (Croatia) Dino Marcan	(Slovakia) Andrej Martin (Croatia) Dino Marcan	(Slovakia) Ivo Klec (Germany) Kevin Krawietz (Croatia) Toni Androić (Croatia) Kristijan Mesaroš
September 26	France F16 Futures; Forbach, France; Carpet (indoor) $10,000	(France) Rudy Coco; 4–6, 7–6^{(7–2)}, 7–6^{(7–1)}	(France) Albano Olivetti	(France) Sébastien Boltz (South Africa) Jean Andersen	(Switzerland) Yann Marti (Switzerland) Adrien Bossel (France) Kevin Botti (France) Tristan Lamasine
September 26	France F16 Futures; Forbach, France; Carpet (indoor) $10,000	(South Africa) Jean Andersen (Republic of Ireland) James Cluskey; 5–7, 6–1, [10–3]	(Germany) Sebastian Fitz (Russia) Vitaliy Kachanovskiy	(France) Sébastien Boltz (South Africa) Jean Andersen	(Switzerland) Yann Marti (Switzerland) Adrien Bossel (France) Kevin Botti (France) Tristan Lamasine
September 26	Germany F15 Futures; Hambach, Germany; Carpet (indoor) $10,000	(Germany) Marko Lenz; 7–5, 7–6^{(7–5)}	(Germany) Moritz Baumann	(Germany) Enrico Alonso de Pedro (Germany) Robin Kern	(Germany) Holger Fischer (Switzerland) Sandro Ehrat (Italy) Emanuele Molina (Croatia) Ante Pavić
September 26	Germany F15 Futures; Hambach, Germany; Carpet (indoor) $10,000	(Switzerland) Sandro Ehrat (Croatia) Ante Pavić; 6–4, 6–2	(Germany) Marko Lenz (Germany) George von Massow	(Germany) Enrico Alonso de Pedro (Germany) Robin Kern	(Germany) Holger Fischer (Switzerland) Sandro Ehrat (Italy) Emanuele Molina (Croatia) Ante Pavić
September 26	Hungary F3 Futures; Budapest, Hungary; Clay $10,000	(Hungary) Attila Balázs; 7–6^{(7–4)}, 7–5	(France) Nicolas Devilder	(Czech Republic) Roman Jebavý (Germany) Steven Moneke	(Hungary) György Balázs (Slovakia) Norbert Gombos (Czech Republic) Adam Pavlásek (Czech Republic) Marek Michalička
September 26	Hungary F3 Futures; Budapest, Hungary; Clay $10,000	(Slovakia) Norbert Gombos (Czech Republic) Roman Jebavý; 6–2, 6–0	(Austria) Mario Kargl (Austria) Lukas Weinhandl	(Czech Republic) Roman Jebavý (Germany) Steven Moneke	(Hungary) György Balázs (Slovakia) Norbert Gombos (Czech Republic) Adam Pavlásek (Czech Republic) Marek Michalička
September 26	Indonesia F4 Futures; Jakarta, Indonesia; Hard $15,000	(Finland) Harri Heliövaara; 6–3, 1–0, retired	(South Korea) Daniel Yoo	(Japan) Junn Mitsuhashi (Switzerland) Alexander Sadecky	(Indonesia) Christopher Rungkat (India) Vishnu Vardhan (Indonesia) David Agung Susanto (India) Yuki Bhambri
September 26	Indonesia F4 Futures; Jakarta, Indonesia; Hard $15,000	(China) Li Zhe (Chinese Taipei) Yi Chu-huan; 6–3, 6–2	(India) Yuki Bhambri (India) Rohan Gajjar	(Japan) Junn Mitsuhashi (Switzerland) Alexander Sadecky	(Indonesia) Christopher Rungkat (India) Vishnu Vardhan (Indonesia) David Agung Susanto (India) Yuki Bhambri
September 26	Italy F29 Futures; Frascati, Italy; Clay $10,000	(France) Axel Michon; 6–4, 6–1	(Romania) Răzvan Sabău	(Italy) Erik Crepaldi (France) François-Arthur Vibert	(Austria) Bastian Trinker (Italy) Filippo Leonardi (Czech Republic) Michal Schmid (Italy) Federico Torresi
September 26	Italy F29 Futures; Frascati, Italy; Clay $10,000	(Czech Republic) Michal Schmid (Austria) Herbert Wiltschnig; 6–2, 6–4	(Italy) Marco Bortolotti (Italy) Alessandro Colella	(Italy) Erik Crepaldi (France) François-Arthur Vibert	(Austria) Bastian Trinker (Italy) Filippo Leonardi (Czech Republic) Michal Schmid (Italy) Federico Torresi
September 26	Mexico F12 Futures; Veracruz, Mexico; Hard $10,000	(Mexico) Luis Díaz Barriga; 6–4, 3–6, 6–3	(New Zealand) Marcus Daniell	(Mexico) Eduardo Peralta-Tello (Mexico) Miguel Gallardo-Vallés	(Italy) Federico Gaio (Mexico) Javier Herrera-Eguiluz (Puerto Rico) Alex Llompart (New Zealand) Anton Bettink
September 26	Mexico F12 Futures; Veracruz, Mexico; Hard $10,000	(El Salvador) Marcelo Arévalo (Puerto Rico) Alex Llompart; 6–3, 6–0	(Mexico) Javier Herrera-Eguiluz (United States) Amrit Narasimhan	(Mexico) Eduardo Peralta-Tello (Mexico) Miguel Gallardo-Vallés	(Italy) Federico Gaio (Mexico) Javier Herrera-Eguiluz (Puerto Rico) Alex Llompart (New Zealand) Anton Bettink
September 26	Portugal F5 Futures; Porto, Portugal; Clay $15,000	(Netherlands) Boy Westerhof; 7–5, 6–1	(Russia) Stanislav Vovk	(France) Julien Obry (Spain) Marc Giner	(Brazil) Fernando Romboli (Germany) Richard Becker (Portugal) Gonçalo Falcão (France) Florian Reynet
September 26	Portugal F5 Futures; Porto, Portugal; Clay $15,000	(Russia) Richard Muzaev (Russia) Alexander Rumyantsev; 2–6, 7–6^{(7–3)}, [10–8]	(Germany) Richard Becker (Brazil) Fernando Romboli	(France) Julien Obry (Spain) Marc Giner	(Brazil) Fernando Romboli (Germany) Richard Becker (Portugal) Gonçalo Falcão (France) Florian Reynet
September 26	Spain F35 Futures; Seville, Spain; Clay $10,000	(Spain) Jordi Samper Montaña; 6–3, 6–4	(Germany) Jean-Marc Werner	(Japan) Taro Daniel (Spain) Pablo Martín-Adalia	(Kazakhstan) Denis Yevseyev (Spain) Gerard Gallego-Bertran (United Kingdom) Liam Broady (Spain) Carlos Gómez-Herrera
September 26	Spain F35 Futures; Seville, Spain; Clay $10,000	(Canada) Steven Diez (Spain) Fernando Vicente; 6–2, 6–1	(Spain) Axel Álvarez Llamas (Spain) Ricardo Ojeda Lara	(Japan) Taro Daniel (Spain) Pablo Martín-Adalia	(Kazakhstan) Denis Yevseyev (Spain) Gerard Gallego-Bertran (United Kingdom) Liam Broady (Spain) Carlos Gómez-Herrera
September 26	Sweden F6 Futures; Falun, Sweden; Hard (indoor) $10,000	(United Kingdom) Alexander Ward; 2–6, 6–4, 6–1	(Sweden) Carl Bergman	(Sweden) Pablo Figueroa (Finland) Timo Nieminen	(Sweden) Michael Ryderstedt (United Kingdom) Daniel Smethurst (United Kingdom) Lewis Burton (Sweden) Lucas Renard
September 26	Sweden F6 Futures; Falun, Sweden; Hard (indoor) $10,000	(United Kingdom) Oliver Golding (United Kingdom) Daniel Smethurst; 7–6^{(7–2)}, 7–6^{(10–8)}	(Sweden) Pierre Bonfre (Sweden) Viktor Stjern	(Sweden) Pablo Figueroa (Finland) Timo Nieminen	(Sweden) Michael Ryderstedt (United Kingdom) Daniel Smethurst (United Kingdom) Lewis Burton (Sweden) Lucas Renard
September 26	Turkey F25 Futures; Antalya, Turkey; Hard $10,000	(Russia) Ervand Gasparyan; 6–7^{(7–9)}, 6–4, 6–3	(Austria) Philipp Oswald	(Canada) Érik Chvojka (Ukraine) Ivan Sergeyev	(Egypt) Mohamed Safwat (South Africa) Ruan Roelofse (Russia) Ivan Nedelko (Japan) Takuto Niki
September 26	Turkey F25 Futures; Antalya, Turkey; Hard $10,000	(United Kingdom) David Rice (United Kingdom) Sean Thornley; 2–6, 6–4, [10–6]	(Russia) Mikhail Biryukov (Russia) Dmitri Sitak	(Canada) Érik Chvojka (Ukraine) Ivan Sergeyev	(Egypt) Mohamed Safwat (South Africa) Ruan Roelofse (Russia) Ivan Nedelko (Japan) Takuto Niki
September 26	USA F25 Futures; Laguna Niguel, USA; Hard $10,000	(United States) Denis Kudla; 6–4, 6–0	(United States) Dennis Lajola	(Zimbabwe) Takanyi Garanganga (India) Sanam Singh	(United States) Christian Harrison (Australia) John-Patrick Smith (Australia) Sean Berman (Belarus) Kiryl Harbatsiuk
September 26	USA F25 Futures; Laguna Niguel, USA; Hard $10,000	(Australia) Benjamin Rogers (Australia) John-Patrick Smith; 6–3, 7–6^{(7–3)}	(Japan) Yaoki Ichii (Japan) Yuichi Ito	(Zimbabwe) Takanyi Garanganga (India) Sanam Singh	(United States) Christian Harrison (Australia) John-Patrick Smith (Australia) Sean Berman (Belarus) Kiryl Harbatsiuk
September 26	Venezuela F7 Futures; Barquisimeto, Venezuela; Clay $15,000	(Argentina) Juan Pablo Ortiz; 3–6, 7–5, 6–4	(Colombia) Juan Sebastián Gómez	(Venezuela) Román Recarte (Peru) Mauricio Echazú	(Argentina) Marco Trungelliti (Venezuela) Luis David Martínez (United States) Maciek Sykut (Venezuela) Ricardo Rodríguez
September 26	Venezuela F7 Futures; Barquisimeto, Venezuela; Clay $15,000	(United States) Maciek Sykut (United States) Denis Zivkovic; 6–3, 6–2	(Colombia) Nicolás Barrientos (Colombia) Sebastián Serrano	(Venezuela) Román Recarte (Peru) Mauricio Echazú	(Argentina) Marco Trungelliti (Venezuela) Luis David Martínez (United States) Maciek Sykut (Venezuela) Ricardo Rodríguez
