= 2013 Banja Luka Challenger – Singles =

Singles
- 2013 Banja Luka Challenger

Final
- Champions: (Slovenia) Aljaž Bedene
- Runners-up: (Argentina) Diego Schwartzman
- Score: 6–3, 6–4

Events
Singles	Doubles
← 2012 ·	Banja Luka Challenger	· 2014 →

Aljaž Bedene took the title, beating Diego Schwartzman 6–3, 6–4

== Seeds ==
1. (Italy) Filippo Volandri (semifinals)
2. (Slovenia) Aljaž Bedene (champion)
3. (Germany) Julian Reister (second round)
4. (Argentina) Diego Sebastián Schwartzman (final)
5. (Ukraine) Oleksandr Nedovyesov (quarterfinals)
6. (Germany) Simon Greul (first round, retired due to right hip injury)
7. (Czech Republic) Jan Mertl (quarterfinals)
8. (Italy) Marco Cecchinato (first round, retired due to stomach ache)

== Draw ==
=== Key ===
- Q = Qualifier
- WC = Wild card
- LL = Lucky loser
- Alt = Alternate
- SE = Special exempt
- PR = Protected ranking
- ITF = ITF entry
- JE = Junior exempt
- w/o = Walkover
- r = Retired
- d = Defaulted
- SR = Special ranking

=== Finals ===
Semifinals
1	(Italy) Filippo Volandri	2	4
4	(Argentina) Diego Sebastián Schwartzman	6	6
(Croatia) Kristijan Mesaroš	3	0
2	(Slovenia) Aljaž Bedene	6	6

Final
4	(Argentina) Diego Sebastián Schwartzman	3	4
2	(Slovenia) Aljaž Bedene	6	6

=== Top half ===
First round
1	(Italy) F Volandri	7^{7}	6
Q	(Serbia) D Petrović	6^{2}	2
(Greece) T Angelinos	4	4
(Poland) G Panfil	6	6
(Italy) A Arnaboldi	6	6
WC	(Slovenia) M Urbanija	3	3
(Slovakia) M Mečíř	2	7^{7}	3
5	(Ukraine) O Nedovyesov	6	6^{5}	6
4	(Argentina) DS Schwartzman	6	6
WC	(Serbia) D Djokovic	1	2
(Netherlands) B Westerhof	3	5
(Czech Republic) J Pospíšil	6	7
WC	(Serbia) P Krstin	7^{7}	4	6
(Germany) D Meffert	6^{4}	6	0
LL	(Serbia) Ivan Bjelica	1	1
7	(Czech Republic) J Mertl	6	6

Second round
1	(Italy) F Volandri	6	6
(Poland) G Panfil	3	4
(Italy) A Arnaboldi	4	3
5	(Ukraine) O Nedovyesov	6	6
4	(Argentina) DS Schwartzman	3	7^{7}	6
(Czech Republic) J Pospíšil	6	6^{5}	2
WC	(Serbia) P Krstin	4	0
7	(Czech Republic) J Mertl	6	6

Quarterfinals
1	(Italy) F Volandri	6^{4}	6	6
5	(Ukraine) O Nedovyesov	7^{7}	1	4
4	(Argentina) DS Schwartzman	6	6
7	(Czech Republic) J Mertl	1	2

Semifinals
1	(Italy) F Volandri	2	4
4	(Argentina) DS Schwartzman	6	6

=== Bottom half ===
First round
6	(Germany) S Greul	3	0^{r}
Q	(Croatia) A Pavić	6	1
(Bosnia and Herzegovina) D Džumhur	0	6	3
(Netherlands) T Schoorel	6	2	6
(Croatia) K Mesaroš	6	0
Q	(Croatia) Marin Bradarić	4	0^{r}
(Czech Republic) Michal Konečný	0	1^{r}
3	(Germany) J Reister	6	2
8	(Italy) M Cecchinato	1	0^{r}
(Slovakia) M Semjan	6	1
(Slovakia) N Gombos	5	6	7
Q	(Poland) Piotr Gadomski	7	1	5
Alt	(Serbia) M Zekić	2	2
(Italy) S Vagnozzi	6	6
WC	(Serbia) L Đere	1	6^{6}
2	(Slovenia) A Bedene	6	7^{8}

Second round
Q	(Croatia) A Pavić	6	6
(Netherlands) T Schoorel	3	2
(Croatia) K Mesaroš	4	6	6
3	(Germany) J Reister	6	3	4
(Slovakia) M Semjan	4	3
(Slovakia) N Gombos	6	6
(Italy) S Vagnozzi	4	7^{7}	6^{3}
2	(Slovenia) A Bedene	6	6^{5}	7^{7}

Quarterfinals
Q	(Croatia) A Pavić	2	5
(Croatia) K Mesaroš	6	7
(Slovakia) N Gombos	4	4
2	(Slovenia) A Bedene	6	6

Semifinals
(Croatia) K Mesaroš	3	0
2	(Slovenia) A Bedene	6	6
