= 2011 Banja Luka Challenger – Singles =

Singles
- 2011 Banja Luka Challenger

Final
- Champion: (Slovenia) Blaž Kavčič
- Runner-up: (Spain) Pere Riba
- Score: 6–4, 6–1

Events
Singles	Doubles
← 2010 ·	Banja Luka Challenger	· 2012 →

Marsel İlhan was the defending champion but decided not to participate.

2nd seed Blaž Kavčič claimed the title, defeating 1st seed Pere Riba 6–4, 6–1 in the final.

== Seeds ==
1. (Spain) Pere Riba (final)
2. (Slovenia) Blaž Kavčič (champion)
3. (Spain) Daniel Gimeno-Traver (semifinals)
4. (Italy) Flavio Cipolla (second round)
5. (Slovenia) Grega Žemlja (first round)
6. (Czech Republic) Jaroslav Pospíšil (first round)
7. (Spain) Rubén Ramírez Hidalgo (second round)
8. (Spain) Pablo Carreño-Busta (quarterfinals)

== Draw ==
=== Key ===
- Q = Qualifier
- WC = Wild card
- LL = Lucky loser
- Alt = Alternate
- SE = Special exempt
- PR = Protected ranking
- ITF = ITF entry
- JE = Junior exempt
- w/o = Walkover
- r = Retired
- d = Defaulted
- SR = Special ranking

=== Finals ===
Semifinals
1	(Spain) Pere Riba	7^{7}	6
3	(Spain) Daniel Gimeno-Traver	6^{4}	0
(Italy) Simone Vagnozzi	4	5
2	(Slovenia) Blaž Kavčič	6	7

Final
1	(Spain) Pere Riba	4	1
2	(Slovenia) Blaž Kavčič	6	6

=== Top half ===
First round
1	(Spain) P Riba	6	4
(Czech Republic) D Lojda	4	0^{r}
(Slovakia) I Klec	7	1	6
(Brazil) F Romboli	5	6	4
(France) J Dasnières de Veigy	1	1
WC	(Bosnia and Herzegovina) M Bašić	6	6
Q	(Serbia) N Čačić	6	6
6	(Czech Republic) J Pospíšil	4	1
3	(Spain) D Gimeno-Traver	6	6
Q	(Croatia) T Androić	4	2
(Czech Republic) J Mertl	6	6
WC	(Montenegro) G Tošić	4	0
(France) M Teixeira	3	0
Q	(Croatia) D Marcan	6	6
(Canada) F Dancevic	3	6^{4}
8	(Spain) P Carreño-Busta	6	7^{7}

Second round
1	(Spain) P Riba	6	6
(Slovakia) I Klec	2	2
WC	(Bosnia and Herzegovina) M Bašić	4	6	6
Q	(Serbia) N Čačić	6	3	3
3	(Spain) D Gimeno-Traver	7	6
(Czech Republic) J Mertl	5	2
Q	(Croatia) D Marcan	1	2
8	(Spain) P Carreño-Busta	6	6

Quarterfinals
1	(Spain) P Riba	6	6
WC	(Bosnia and Herzegovina) M Bašić	1	3
3	(Spain) D Gimeno-Traver	4	6	6
8	(Spain) P Carreño-Busta	6	3	4

Semifinals
1	(Spain) P Riba	7^{7}	6
3	(Spain) D Gimeno-Traver	6^{4}	0

=== Bottom half ===
First round
5	(Slovenia) G Žemlja	6	4	6^{4}
(Spain) I Navarro	3	6	7^{7}
(Italy) S Vagnozzi	6	6
(Slovakia) K Čapkovič	3	2
(Spain) G Alcaide	6	4	1
Q	(Croatia) Ante Pavić	4	6	6
(Serbia) B Pašanski	3	2
4	(Italy) F Cipolla	6	6
7	(Spain) R Ramírez Hidalgo	6	6
(Italy) M Crugnola	3	0
WC	(Serbia) Ivan Bjelica	1	1
(Slovenia) A Bedene	6	6
(Italy) M Viola	3	1
(Netherlands) M Middelkoop	6	6
WC	(Bosnia and Herzegovina) T Brkić	7^{7}	4	1
2	(Slovenia) B Kavčič	6^{3}	6	6

Second round
(Spain) I Navarro	2	3
(Italy) S Vagnozzi	6	6
Q	(Croatia) A Pavić	6	3	7
4	(Italy) F Cipolla	4	6	5
7	(Spain) R Ramírez Hidalgo	6	6^{1}	3
(Slovenia) A Bedene	1	7^{7}	6
(Netherlands) M Middelkoop	7^{8}	1	4
2	(Slovenia) B Kavčič	6^{6}	6	6

Quarterfinals
(Italy) S Vagnozzi	6	6
Q	(Croatia) A Pavić	3	1
(Slovenia) A Bedene	4	6^{4}
2	(Slovenia) B Kavčič	6	7^{7}

Semifinals
(Italy) S Vagnozzi	4	5
2	(Slovenia) B Kavčič	6	7
