= 2012 Banja Luka Challenger – Doubles =

Doubles
- 2012 Banja Luka Challenger

Final
- Champions: (Croatia) Marin Draganja (Croatia) Lovro Zovko
- Runners-up: (Australia) Colin Ebelthite (Czech Republic) Jaroslav Pospíšil
- Score: 6–1, 6–1

Events
Singles	Doubles
← 2011 ·	Banja Luka Challenger	· 2013 →

Marco Crugnola and Rubén Ramírez Hidalgo were the defending champions but decided not to participate.
Marin Draganja and Lovro Zovko won the title, defeating Colin Ebelthite and Jaroslav Pospíšil 6–1, 6–1 in the final.

== Seeds ==
1. (United States) Nicholas Monroe / (Germany) Simon Stadler (semifinals)
2. (Canada) Adil Shamasdin / (Slovakia) Igor Zelenay (first round)
3. (Australia) Colin Ebelthite / (Czech Republic) Jaroslav Pospíšil (final)
4. (Germany) Philipp Marx / (Germany) Björn Phau (first round)

== Draw ==
=== Key ===
- Q = Qualifier
- WC = Wild card
- LL = Lucky loser
- Alt = Alternate
- SE = Special exempt
- PR = Protected ranking
- ITF = ITF entry
- JE = Junior exempt
- w/o = Walkover
- r = Retired
- d = Defaulted
- SR = Special ranking

=== Draw ===
First round
1	(United States) N Monroe (Germany) S Stadler	6	6^{4}	[10]
WC	(Serbia) M Djokovic (Spain) C Gómez-Herrera	0	7^{7}	[7]
WC	(Bosnia and Herzegovina) I Gorčić (Bosnia and Herzegovina) A Šetkić	6	4	[8]
(Bosnia and Herzegovina) D Džumhur (Croatia) D Marcan	3	6	[10]
4	(Germany) P Marx (Germany) B Phau	0	2
(Croatia) N Mektić (Croatia) A Veić	6	6
(Croatia) M Draganja (Croatia) L Zovko	7	6^{10}	[11]
WC	(Bosnia and Herzegovina) T Brkić (Austria) B Trinker	5	7^{12}	[9]
(Croatia) M Pavić (Croatia) F Škugor	7^{7}	6
(Italy) S Ianni (Italy) S Vagnozzi	6^{3}	3
(Netherlands) A van der Duim (Netherlands) B Westerhof	5	5
3	(Australia) C Ebelthite (Czech Republic) J Pospíšil	7	7
(Serbia) N Čačić (Serbia) D Lajović	3	6^{4}
(Slovakia) K Čapkovič (Slovakia) P Červenák	6	7^{7}
(Czech Republic) J Mertl (Netherlands) M Middelkoop	6	6^{7}	[10]
2	(Canada) A Shamasdin (Slovakia) I Zelenay	2	7^{9}	[7]

Quarterfinals
1	(United States) N Monroe (Germany) S Stadler	7^{7}	7^{7}
(Bosnia and Herzegovina) D Džumhur (Croatia) D Marcan	6^{5}	6^{4}
(Croatia) N Mektić (Croatia) A Veić	2	2
(Croatia) M Draganja (Croatia) L Zovko	6	6
(Croatia) M Pavić (Croatia) F Škugor	6^{5}	7^{9}	[5]
3	(Australia) C Ebelthite (Czech Republic) J Pospíšil	7^{7}	6^{7}	[10]
(Slovakia) K Čapkovič (Slovakia) P Červenák	3	2
(Czech Republic) J Mertl (Netherlands) M Middelkoop	6	6

Semifinals
1	(United States) N Monroe (Germany) S Stadler	6^{6}	4
(Croatia) M Draganja (Croatia) L Zovko	7^{8}	6
3	(Australia) C Ebelthite (Czech Republic) J Pospíšil	6	6
(Czech Republic) J Mertl (Netherlands) M Middelkoop	3	2

Final
(Croatia) M Draganja (Croatia) L Zovko	6	6
3	(Australia) C Ebelthite (Czech Republic) J Pospíšil	1	1
