= 2015 Banja Luka Challenger – Singles =

Singles
- 2015 Banja Luka Challenger
- 2014 Champion: (Serbia) Viktor Troicki

Events
Singles	Doubles
← 2014 ·	Banja Luka Challenger	· 2016 →

Viktor Troicki was the defending champion, but chose not to defend his title.

== Seeds ==
1. (Spain) Daniel Gimeno-Traver (second round)
2. (Spain) Marcel Granollers (withdrew, due to right hip injury)
3. (Serbia) Dušan Lajović
4. (Argentina) Horacio Zeballos (quarterfinals)
5. (Germany) Tobias Kamke (first round)
6. (Serbia) Laslo Djere (first round)
7. (France) Calvin Hemery (first round)
8. (France) Mathias Bourgue (second round)

== Draw ==
=== Key ===
- Q = Qualifier
- WC = Wild card
- LL = Lucky loser
- Alt = Alternate
- SE = Special exempt
- PR = Protected ranking
- ITF = ITF entry
- JE = Junior exempt
- w/o = Walkover
- r = Retired
- d = Defaulted
- SR = Special ranking

=== Finals ===
Semifinals
(Romania) Victor Hănescu	7	6^{6}	6
(Serbia) Miljan Zekić	5	7^{8}	4
3	(Serbia) Dušan Lajović	6	6
(Romania) Adrian Ungur	3	4

Final
(Romania) Victor Hănescu	6^{5}	6^{5}
3	(Serbia) Dušan Lajović	7^{7}	7^{7}

=== Top half ===
First round
1	(Spain) D Gimeno-Traver	6^{8}	6	7^{7}
(Spain) R Ramírez Hidalgo	7^{10}	1	6^{4}
WC	(Italy) F Cipolla	6	7^{7}
Q	(Croatia) A Šančić	3	6^{5}
(Argentina) P Cachin	1	4
(Romania) V Hănescu	6	6
WC	(Serbia) I Bozoljac	6^{5}	3
8	(France) M Bourgue	7^{7}	6
4	(Argentina) H Zeballos	6	6
LL	(Italy) Nicola Ghedin	3	2
Q	(France) S Doumbia	3	4
(Serbia) P Krstin	6	6
(Croatia) N Mektić	3	2
(Serbia) M Zekić	6	6
(France) A Musialek	5
5	(Germany) T Kamke	1^{r}

Second round
1	(Spain) D Gimeno-Traver	4	6^{5}
WC	(Italy) F Cipolla	6	7^{7}
(Romania) V Hănescu	6	7^{7}
8	(France) M Bourgue	1	6^{3}
4	(Argentina) H Zeballos	4	6	6
(Serbia) P Krstin	6	3	4
(Serbia) M Zekić	6	6
(France) A Musialek	1	4

Quarterfinals
WC	(Italy) F Cipolla	1	2
(Romania) V Hănescu	6	6
4	(Argentina) H Zeballos	6	6^{8}	6^{4}
(Serbia) M Zekić	3	7^{10}	7^{7}

Semifinals
(Romania) V Hănescu	7	6^{6}	6
(Serbia) M Zekić	5	7^{8}	4

=== Bottom half ===
First round
7	(France) C Hemery	4	6^{3}
Q	(France) A Michon	6	7^{7}
(Slovenia) G Žemlja	4	3
(Italy) R Bellotti	6	6
(Czech Republic) J Šátral	4	4
WC	(Spain) J Munar	6	6
(Spain) Marc Giner	3	4
3	(Serbia) D Lajović	6	6
6	(Serbia) L Djere	3	6	3
(Romania) A Ungur	6	1	6
Q	(Romania) P-A Luncanu	6	3	4
(Bosnia and Herzegovina) T Brkić	3	6	6
(Slovakia) J Kovalík	6	6
(Spain) P Riba	3	2
WC	(Czech Republic) J Pospíšil	6	6
LL	(France) J Inzerillo	4	4

Second round
Q	(France) A Michon	4	6^{2}
(Italy) R Bellotti	6	7^{7}
WC	(Spain) J Munar	6^{5}	4
3	(Serbia) D Lajović	7^{7}	6
(Romania) A Ungur	6	6
(Bosnia and Herzegovina) T Brkić	1	1
(Slovakia) J Kovalík	6	6
WC	(Czech Republic) J Pospíšil	4	1

Quarterfinals
(Italy) R Bellotti	3	3
3	(Serbia) D Lajović	6	6
(Romania) A Ungur	6	6
(Slovakia) J Kovalík	3	1

Semifinals
3	(Serbia) D Lajović	6	6
(Romania) A Ungur	3	4
