= 2018 Banja Luka Challenger – Singles =

Singles
- 2018 Banja Luka Challenger

Final
- Champion: (Italy) Alessandro Giannessi
- Runner-up: (Argentina) Carlos Berlocq
- Score: 6–7^{(6–8)}, 6–4, 6–4

Events
Singles	Doubles
← 2017 ·	Banja Luka Challenger	· 2019 →

Maximilian Marterer was the defending champion but chose not to defend his title.

Alessandro Giannessi won the title after defeating Carlos Berlocq 6–7^{(6–8)}, 6–4, 6–4 in the final.

== Seeds ==
1. (Argentina) Juan Ignacio Londero (quarterfinals)
2. (Spain) Pablo Andújar (quarterfinals)
3. (Argentina) Marco Trungelliti (first round)
4. (Spain) Daniel Gimeno Traver (quarterfinals)
5. (Slovakia) Andrej Martin (first round)
6. (Chile) Christian Garín (second round, withdrew)
7. (Argentina) Carlos Berlocq (final)
8. (Spain) Pedro Martínez (first round)

== Draw ==
=== Key ===
- Q = Qualifier
- WC = Wild card
- LL = Lucky loser
- Alt = Alternate
- SE = Special exempt
- PR = Protected ranking
- ITF = ITF entry
- JE = Junior exempt
- w/o = Walkover
- r = Retired
- d = Defaulted
- SR = Special ranking

=== Finals ===
Semifinals
(Italy) Filippo Baldi	6^{3}	4
(Italy) Alessandro Giannessi	7^{7}	6
(France) Johan Tatlot	2	4
7	(Argentina) Carlos Berlocq	6	6

Final
(Italy) Alessandro Giannessi	6^{6}	6	6
7	(Argentina) Carlos Berlocq	7^{8}	4	4

=== Top half ===
First round
1	(Argentina) JI Londero	5	6	5
Q	(Russia) A Karatsev	7	3	3^{r}
Q	(Argentina) F Coria	6	6
(Germany) K Krawietz	3	1
(Italy) F Baldi	6	6
(Belgium) K Coppejans	1	4
WC	(Japan) Kento Tagashira	0	1
6	(Chile) C Garín	6	6
3	(Argentina) M Trungelliti	3	3
(Lithuania) L Grigelis	6	6
SE	(Brazil) T Bellucci	7^{7}	6
(Argentina) P Cachin	6^{2}	1
(Bulgaria) D Kuzmanov	6	7^{7}
(Croatia) A Pavić	1	6^{0}
(Italy) A Giannessi	6	4	6
5	(Slovakia) A Martin	4	6	4

Second round
1	(Argentina) JI Londero	6	6
Q	(Argentina) F Coria	4	2
(Italy) F Baldi	w/o
6	(Chile) C Garín
(Lithuania) L Grigelis	2	7^{7}	6
SE	(Brazil) T Bellucci	6	6^{5}	3
(Bulgaria) D Kuzmanov	6	2	2
(Italy) A Giannessi	2	6	6

Quarterfinals
1	(Argentina) JI Londero	6	0	5
(Italy) F Baldi	4	6	7
(Lithuania) L Grigelis	3	4
(Italy) A Giannessi	6	6

Semifinals
(Italy) F Baldi	6^{3}	4
(Italy) A Giannessi	7^{7}	6

=== Bottom half ===
First round
8	(Spain) P Martínez	3	4
(France) J Tatlot	6	6
Q	(Bulgaria) A Lazov	6	6
WC	(Croatia) Franjo Raspudić	4	1
(Spain) R Ojeda Lara	6	6
WC	(Serbia) M Zekić	4	4
(Slovakia) F Horanský	1	6^{2}
4	(Spain) D Gimeno Traver	6	7^{7}
7	(Argentina) C Berlocq	6	6
WC	(Serbia) M Miladinović	2	1
(Spain) O Roca Batalla	6	6
(Russia) I Nedelko	0	4
(Spain) B Zapata Miralles	6	6
(Italy) G Mager	4	1
Q	(Italy) A Vavassori	0	1
2	(Spain) P Andújar	6	6

Second round
(France) J Tatlot	6	6
Q	(Bulgaria) A Lazov	3	4
(Spain) R Ojeda Lara	4	2
4	(Spain) D Gimeno Traver	6	6
7	(Argentina) C Berlocq	6	6
(Spain) O Roca Batalla	4	4
(Spain) B Zapata Miralles	4	5
2	(Spain) P Andújar	6	7

Quarterfinals
(France) J Tatlot	4	7	7
4	(Spain) D Gimeno Traver	6	5	5
7	(Argentina) C Berlocq	3	6	6
2	(Spain) P Andújar	6	4	1

Semifinals
(France) J Tatlot	2	4
7	(Argentina) C Berlocq	6	6
