= 2022 Banja Luka Challenger =

- Date: 22–28 August
- Edition: 20th
- Surface: Clay
- Location: Banja Luka, Bosnia and Herzegovina

Champions

Singles
- (Hungary) Fábián Marozsán

Doubles
- (Ukraine) Vladyslav Manafov / (Ukraine) Oleg Prihodko
| ← 2021 · | Banja Luka Challenger | · 2023 → |

The 2022 Banja Luka Challenger was a professional tennis tournament played on clay courts. It was the 20th edition of the tournament which was part of the 2022 ATP Challenger Tour. It took place in Banja Luka, Bosnia and Herzegovina from 22 to 28 August 2022.

== Singles main-draw entrants ==
=== Seeds ===
| Country | Player | Rank^{1} | Seed |
|---|---|---|---|
| ESP | Nicolás Álvarez Varona | 223 | 1 |
| HUN | Fábián Marozsán | 234 | 2 |
| BIH | Damir Džumhur | 238 | 3 |
| ESP | Nikolás Sánchez Izquierdo | 244 | 4 |
| FIN | Otto Virtanen | 247 | 5 |
| POR | Frederico Ferreira Silva | 251 | 6 |
| ITA | Lorenzo Giustino | 252 | 7 |
| BIH | Mirza Bašić | 258 | 8 |

- ^{1} Rankings are as of 15 August 2022.

=== Other entrants ===
The following players received wildcards into the singles main draw:

- (Ukraine) Yevhenii Bondarenko
- (Bosnia and Herzegovina) Damir Džumhur
- Matvey Minin

The following player received entry into the singles main draw using a protected ranking:

- (United Kingdom) Jan Choinski

The following player received entry into the singles main draw as an alternate:

- (Romania) Filip Cristian Jianu

The following players received entry from the qualifying draw:

- (Belgium) Kimmer Coppejans
- (Lebanon) Benjamin Hassan
- (Bosnia and Herzegovina) Aldin Šetkić
- (Brazil) Thiago Seyboth Wild
- (Germany) Marko Topo
- (Italy) Alexander Weis

== Champions ==
=== Singles ===
- (Hungary) Fábián Marozsán def. (Bosnia and Herzegovina) Damir Džumhur 6–2, 6–1.

=== Doubles ===
- (Ukraine) Vladyslav Manafov / (Ukraine) Oleg Prihodko def. (Germany) Fabian Fallert / (Germany) Hendrik Jebens 6–3, 6–4.
