= 2017 Banja Luka Challenger – Doubles =

Doubles
- 2017 Banja Luka Challenger

Final
- Champions: (Croatia) Marin Draganja (Croatia) Tomislav Draganja
- Runners-up: (Serbia) Danilo Petrović (Serbia) Ilija Vučić
- Score: 6–4, 6–2

Events
Singles	Doubles
← 2016 ·	Banja Luka Challenger	· 2018 →

Roman Jebavý and Jan Šátral were the defending champions but chose not to defend their title.

Marin and Tomislav Draganja won the title after defeating Danilo Petrović and Ilija Vučić 6–4, 6–2 in the final.

== Seeds ==
1. (Netherlands) Sander Arends / (Croatia) Dino Marcan (first round)
2. (Croatia) Marin Draganja / (Croatia) Tomislav Draganja (champions)
3. (Philippines) Ruben Gonzales / (United States) Hunter Reese (semifinals)
4. (Italy) Andrea Arnaboldi / (Italy) Flavio Cipolla (withdrew)

== Draw ==
=== Key ===
- Q = Qualifier
- WC = Wild card
- LL = Lucky loser
- Alt = Alternate
- SE = Special exempt
- PR = Protected ranking
- ITF = ITF entry
- JE = Junior exempt
- w/o = Walkover
- r = Retired
- d = Defaulted
- SR = Special ranking

First round
1	(Netherlands) S Arends (Croatia) D Marcan	7	4	[9]
(Croatia) I Sabanov (Croatia) M Sabanov	5	6	[11]
(Belgium) K Coppejans (Slovenia) B Rola	2	6^{4}
(Serbia) D Petrović (Serbia) Ilija Vučić	6	7^{7}
3	(Philippines) R Gonzales (United States) H Reese	4	6	[10]
WC	(Bosnia and Herzegovina) T Brkić (Serbia) Milan Radojković	6	3	[8]
(Italy) L Giustino (Spain) P Toledo Bagué	4	6	[3]
(Czech Republic) V Šafránek (Croatia) N Serdarušić	6	4	[10]
WC	(Serbia) N Čačić (Serbia) M Kecmanović	6	6
WC	(Bosnia and Herzegovina) Andrej Đurić (Bosnia and Herzegovina) Ivan Randjelović	0	0
(Spain) R Ojeda Lara (Spain) C Taberner	6	6
Alt	(Italy) Erik Crepaldi (Germany) Elmar Ejupovic	4	4
(Germany) K Krawietz (Germany) M Marterer	w/o
(France) A Müller (Spain) J Munar
(Serbia) P Krstin (Serbia) N Milojević
2	(Croatia) M Draganja (Croatia) T Draganja	w/o

Quarterfinals
(Croatia) I Sabanov (Croatia) M Sabanov	1	4
(Serbia) D Petrović (Serbia) I Vučić	6	6
3	(Philippines) R Gonzales (United States) H Reese	6	7^{7}
(Czech Republic) V Šafránek (Croatia) N Serdarušić	3	6^{3}
WC	(Serbia) N Čačić (Serbia) M Kecmanović	6	6
(Spain) R Ojeda Lara (Spain) C Taberner	4	2
(Germany) K Krawietz (Germany) M Marterer	4	6	[8]
2	(Croatia) M Draganja (Croatia) T Draganja	6	3	[10]

Semifinals
(Serbia) D Petrović (Serbia) I Vučić	6	6
3	(Philippines) R Gonzales (United States) H Reese	1	4
WC	(Serbia) N Čačić (Serbia) M Kecmanović	6	2	[7]
2	(Croatia) M Draganja (Croatia) T Draganja	4	6	[10]

Final
(Serbia) D Petrović (Serbia) I Vučić	4	2
2	(Croatia) M Draganja (Croatia) T Draganja	6	6
