= 2014 Banja Luka Challenger – Doubles =

Doubles
- 2014 Banja Luka Challenger

Final
- Champions: (Croatia) Dino Marcan (Croatia) Antonio Šančić
- Runners-up: (Czech Republic) Jaroslav Pospíšil (Slovakia) Adrian Sikora
- Score: 7–5, 6–4

Events
Singles	Doubles
← 2013 ·	Banja Luka Challenger	· 2015 →

Marin Draganja and Nikola Mektić were the defending champions but only Nikola Mektić returned, partnering Goran Tošić, but lost in the first round to Dino Marcan and Antonio Šančić.

Dino Marcan and Antonio Šančić won the title, defeating Jaroslav Pospíšil and Adrian Sikora 7–5, 6–4 in the final.

== Seeds ==
1. (Croatia) Nikola Mektić / (Serbia) Goran Tošić (first round)
2. (United States) Chase Buchanan / (Slovenia) Blaž Rola (quarterfinals, withdrew)
3. (Netherlands) Stephan Fransen / (Netherlands) Matwé Middelkoop (first round)
4. (Netherlands) Romano Frantzen / (United Kingdom) Darren Walsh (semifinals)

== Draw ==
=== Key ===
- Q = Qualifier
- WC = Wild card
- LL = Lucky loser
- Alt = Alternate
- SE = Special exempt
- PR = Protected ranking
- ITF = ITF entry
- JE = Junior exempt
- w/o = Walkover
- r = Retired
- d = Defaulted
- SR = Special ranking

=== Draw ===
First round
1	(Croatia) N Mektić (Serbia) G Tošić	6^{5}	4
(Croatia) D Marcan (Croatia) A Šančić	7^{7}	6
(Russia) A Karatsev (Russia) V Rudnev	6^{13}	2
(France) G Sakharov (Ukraine) A Smirnov	7^{15}	6
3	(Netherlands) S Fransen (Netherlands) M Middelkoop	6	6^{7}	[4]
(Serbia) P Krstin (Serbia) M Zekić	2	7^{9}	[10]
(Serbia) M Djokovic (Bosnia and Herzegovina) A Šetkić	6	6
(Germany) R Becker (Germany) N Langer	1	1
(Serbia) Ivan Bjelica (Serbia) Luka Sucevic	1
(Germany) Y Maden (Brazil) T Monteiro	2r
(Belgium) A De Greef (France) T Lamasine	4	7^{11}	[7]
4	(Netherlands) Romano Frantzen (United Kingdom) D Walsh	6	6^{9}	[10]
(Serbia) B Pašanski (Austria) B Trinker	3	1
(Czech Republic) J Pospíšil (Slovakia) Adrian Sikora	6	6
(Russia) E Karlovskiy (Croatia) Duje Kekez	2	5
2	(United States) C Buchanan (Slovenia) B Rola	6	7

Quarterfinals
(Croatia) D Marcan (Croatia) A Šančić	6	6
(France) G Sakharov (Ukraine) A Smirnov	1	4
(Serbia) P Krstin (Serbia) M Zekić	6^{4}	5
(Serbia) M Djokovic (Bosnia and Herzegovina) A Šetkić	7^{7}	7
(Serbia) I Bjelica (Serbia) L Sucevic	3	6^{4}
4	(Netherlands) R Frantzen (United Kingdom) D Walsh	6	7^{7}
(Czech Republic) J Pospíšil (Slovakia) A Sikora	w/o
2	(United States) C Buchanan (Slovenia) B Rola

Semifinals
(Croatia) D Marcan (Croatia) A Šančić	6	6
(Serbia) M Djokovic (Bosnia and Herzegovina) A Šetkić	2	2
4	(Netherlands) R Frantzen (United Kingdom) D Walsh	7^{8}	3	[8]
(Czech Republic) J Pospíšil (Slovakia) A Sikora	6^{6}	6	[10]

Final
(Croatia) D Marcan (Croatia) A Šančić	7	6
(Czech Republic) J Pospíšil (Slovakia) A Sikora	5	4
