= 2019 Banja Luka Challenger – Singles =

Singles
- 2019 Banja Luka Challenger

Final
- Champion: (Netherlands) Tallon Griekspoor
- Runner-up: (India) Sumit Nagal
- Score: 6–2, 6–3

Events
Singles	Doubles
← 2018 ·	Banja Luka Challenger	· 2021 →

Alessandro Giannessi was the defending champion but chose not to defend his title.

Tallon Griekspoor won the title after defeating Sumit Nagal 6–2, 6–3 in the final.

== Seeds ==
All seeds receive a bye into the second round.

1. (Netherlands) Robin Haase (second round)
2. (Italy) Filippo Baldi (second round)
3. (Serbia) Nikola Milojević (second round)
4. (Argentina) Federico Coria (quarterfinals)
5. (Slovakia) Filip Horanský (semifinals)
6. (India) Sumit Nagal (final)
7. (Netherlands) Tallon Griekspoor (champion)
8. (Argentina) Carlos Berlocq (third round)
9. (Brazil) Rogério Dutra Silva (second round)
10. (Serbia) Peđa Krstin (semifinals)
11. (Argentina) Andrea Collarini (third round)
12. (Australia) Christopher O'Connell (second round)
13. (Kazakhstan) Dmitry Popko (quarterfinals)
14. (Chile) Alejandro Tabilo (quarterfinals)
15. (Serbia) Danilo Petrović (second round)
16. (Argentina) Facundo Mena (quarterfinals)

== Draw ==
=== Key ===
- Q = Qualifier
- WC = Wild card
- LL = Lucky loser
- Alt = Alternate
- SE = Special exempt
- PR = Protected ranking
- ITF = ITF entry
- JE = Junior exempt
- w/o = Walkover
- r = Retired
- d = Defaulted
- SR = Special ranking

=== Finals ===
Quarterfinals
16	(Argentina) Facundo Mena	7^{10}	5	1
7	(Netherlands) Tallon Griekspoor	6^{8}	7	6
13	(Kazakhstan) Dmitry Popko	4	4
10	(Serbia) Peđa Krstin	6	6
6	(India) Sumit Nagal	6	7
4	(Argentina) Federico Coria	2	5
5	(Slovakia) Filip Horanský	6	5	6
14	(Chile) Alejandro Tabilo	2	7	1

Semifinals
7	(Netherlands) Tallon Griekspoor	6	4	7
10	(Serbia) Peđa Krstin	4	6	5
6	(India) Sumit Nagal	7^{7}	6
5	(Slovakia) Filip Horanský	6^{1}	2

Final
7	(Netherlands) Tallon Griekspoor	6	6
6	(India) Sumit Nagal	2	3

=== Top half ===
==== Section 1 ====
First round
(Italy) GM Moroni	6	6
WC	(Bosnia and Herzegovina) Nemanja Malešević	3	0
(Argentina) C Ugo Carabelli	6	3	6
(Austria) A Erler	4	6	3
(Netherlands) J Sels	2	3
(Brazil) G Clezar	6	6
Q	(France) F Reboul	7^{7}	6
Alt	(Spain) Jaume Pla Malfeito	6^{2}	3

Second round
1	(Netherlands) R Haase	1	4
(Italy) GM Moroni	6	6
(Argentina) C Ugo Carabelli	4	3
16	(Argentina) F Mena	6	6
9	(Brazil) R Dutra Silva	3	1
(Brazil) G Clezar	6	6
Q	(France) F Reboul	5	6	3
7	(Netherlands) T Griekspoor	7	4	6

Third round
(Italy) GM Moroni	4	3
16	(Argentina) F Mena	6	6
(Brazil) G Clezar	4	3
7	(Netherlands) T Griekspoor	6	6

Quarterfinals
16	(Argentina) F Mena	7^{10}	5	1
7	(Netherlands) T Griekspoor	6^{8}	7	6

==== Section 2 ====
First round
(Serbia) M Miladinović	6	5	7^{7}
(Argentina) TM Etcheverry	2	7	6^{5}
(Argentina) GA Olivieri	1	7	6
(France) S Doumbia	6	5	4
(Italy) Riccardo Balzerani	7^{7}	6
(Belgium) M Geerts	6^{5}	1
(Germany) Lucas Gerch	3	5
(Italy) A Arnaboldi	6	7

Second round
3/WC	(Serbia) N Milojević	2	2
(Serbia) M Miladinović	6	6
(Argentina) GA Olivieri	2	1
13	(Kazakhstan) D Popko	6	6
10	(Serbia) P Krstin	6	6
(Italy) R Balzerani	2	4
(Italy) A Arnaboldi	6^{1}	6^{5}
8	(Argentina) C Berlocq	7^{7}	7^{7}

Third round
(Serbia) M Miladinović	6^{5}	6	2
13	(Kazakhstan) D Popko	7^{7}	3	6
10	(Serbia) P Krstin	6	6
8	(Argentina) C Berlocq	2	4

Quarterfinals
13	(Kazakhstan) D Popko	4	4
10	(Serbia) P Krstin	6	6

=== Bottom half ===
==== Section 3 ====
First round
(Russia) I Nedelko	6	7
(Argentina) Matías Zukas	1	5
WC	(Bosnia and Herzegovina) Goran Radanović	0	3
WC	(Croatia) M Pecotić	6	6
(Ukraine) D Kalenichenko	6	6
(Italy) J Berrettini	3	1
(Argentina) JP Ficovich	3	6	3
(Czech Republic) V Šafránek	6	1	6

Second round
6	(India) S Nagal	6	7^{7}
(Russia) I Nedelko	3	6^{3}
WC	(Croatia) M Pecotić	6	5	7^{7}
12	(Australia) C O'Connell	3	7	6^{3}
15	(Serbia) D Petrović	6	5	6^{4}
(Ukraine) D Kalenichenko	3	7	7^{7}
(Czech Republic) V Šafránek	6	1	1
4	(Argentina) F Coria	3	6	6

Third round
6	(India) S Nagal	6	6
WC	(Croatia) M Pecotić	1	1
(Ukraine) D Kalenichenko	6^{1}	0
4	(Argentina) F Coria	7^{7}	6

Quarterfinals
6	(India) S Nagal	6	7
4	(Argentina) F Coria	2	5

==== Section 4 ====
First round
(Serbia) M Zekić	6	1^{r}
(France) Baptiste Crepatte	4	1
(Japan) Y Shimizu	4	6	4
(France) C Denolly	6	2	6
Q	(Croatia) M Sabanov	6	4	6
(Croatia) N Serdarušić	1	6	2
(Czech Republic) Z Kolář	6	6
WC	(Germany) Filip Krolo	0	0

Second round
5	(Slovakia) F Horanský	6	6
(France) B Crepatte	1	2
(France) C Denolly	0^{r}
11	(Argentina) A Collarini	5
14	(Chile) A Tabilo	6	6
Q	(Croatia) M Sabanov	2	0
(Czech Republic) Z Kolář	6	6
2	(Italy) F Baldi	4	2

Third round
5	(Slovakia) F Horanský	3	6	6
11	(Argentina) A Collarini	6	3	3
14	(Chile) A Tabilo	6	5	6
(Czech Republic) Z Kolář	0	7	1

Quarterfinals
5	(Slovakia) F Horanský	6	5	6
14	(Chile) A Tabilo	2	7	1
