= 2015 Banja Luka Challenger – Doubles =

Doubles
- 2015 Banja Luka Challenger
- 2014 Champions: (Croatia) Dino Marcan (Croatia) Antonio Šančić

Events
Singles	Doubles
← 2014 ·	Banja Luka Challenger	· 2016 →

Dino Marcan and Antonio Šančić are the defending champions.

== Seeds ==
1. (Argentina) Guillermo Durán / (Argentina) Horacio Zeballos (semifinals)
2. (Croatia) Dino Marcan / (Croatia) Antonio Šančić (semifinals)
3. (Netherlands) Wesley Koolhof / (Romania) Adrian Ungur (quarterfinals)
4. (Serbia) Ilija Bozoljac / (Italy) Flavio Cipolla (champions)

== Draw ==
=== Key ===
- Q = Qualifier
- WC = Wild card
- LL = Lucky loser
- Alt = Alternate
- SE = Special exempt
- PR = Protected ranking
- ITF = ITF entry
- JE = Junior exempt
- w/o = Walkover
- r = Retired
- d = Defaulted
- SR = Special ranking

First round
1	(Argentina) G Durán (Argentina) H Zeballos	5	6	[10]
(Slovakia) J Kovalík (France) A Michon	7	2	[4]
(Bosnia and Herzegovina) T Brkić (Romania) P-A Luncanu	w/o
(France) C Hemery (France) J Inzerillo
4	(Serbia) I Bozoljac (Italy) F Cipolla	7	5	[10]
(Romania) VV Cornea (Romania) V Hănescu	5	7	[8]
(Serbia) Ilija Vucic (Serbia) M Zekić	6	4	[10]
WC	(Croatia) G Orešić (Croatia) L Zovko	1	6	[5]
(Czech Republic) J Pospíšil (Czech Republic) J Šátral	w/o
(France) S Doumbia (France) A Musialek
(Romania) Alexandru-Daniel Carpen (United Kingdom) D Walsh	6^{6}	3
3	(Netherlands) W Koolhof (Romania) A Ungur	7^{8}	6
(Croatia) N Mektić (Croatia) A Pavić	6	6
WC	(Croatia) I Sabanov (Croatia) M Sabanov	4	2
(Serbia) L Djere (Serbia) P Krstin	1	3
2	(Croatia) D Marcan (Croatia) A Šančić	6	6

Quarterfinals
1	(Argentina) G Durán (Argentina) H Zeballos	4	6	[10]
(Bosnia and Herzegovina) T Brkić (Romania) P-A Luncanu	6	3	[6]
4	(Serbia) I Bozoljac (Italy) F Cipolla	w/o
(Serbia) I Vucic (Serbia) M Zekić
(Czech Republic) J Pospíšil (Czech Republic) J Šátral	6^{9}	6	[10]
3	(Netherlands) W Koolhof (Romania) A Ungur	7^{11}	4	[5]
(Croatia) N Mektić (Croatia) A Pavić	5	4
2	(Croatia) D Marcan (Croatia) A Šančić	7	6

Semifinals
1	(Argentina) G Durán (Argentina) H Zeballos	6	3	[11]
4	(Serbia) I Bozoljac (Italy) F Cipolla	2	6	[13]
(Czech Republic) J Pospíšil (Czech Republic) J Šátral	6	7
2	(Croatia) D Marcan (Croatia) A Šančić	3	5

Final
4	(Serbia) I Bozoljac (Italy) F Cipolla	6	7
(Czech Republic) J Pospíšil (Czech Republic) J Šátral	2	5
