= 2016 Banja Luka Challenger – Singles =

Singles
- 2016 Banja Luka Challenger

Final
- Champion: (Czech Republic) Adam Pavlásek
- Runner-up: (Serbia) Miljan Zekić
- Score: 3–6, 6–1, 6–4

Events
Singles	Doubles
← 2015 ·	Banja Luka Challenger	· 2017 →

Dušan Lajović was the defending champion but chose not to defend his title.

Adam Pavlásek won the title after defeating Miljan Zekić 3–6, 6–1, 6–4 in the final.

== Seeds ==
1. (Argentina) Horacio Zeballos (quarterfinals)
2. (Argentina) Carlos Berlocq (quarterfinals, withdrew)
3. (United Kingdom) Aljaž Bedene (semifinals)
4. (Czech Republic) Adam Pavlásek (champion)
5. (Spain) Rubén Ramírez Hidalgo (second round)
6. (Hungary) Márton Fucsovics (first round)
7. (Serbia) Laslo Đere (second round)
8. (Serbia) Marko Tepavac (first round)

== Draw ==
=== Key ===
- Q = Qualifier
- WC = Wild card
- LL = Lucky loser
- Alt = Alternate
- SE = Special exempt
- PR = Protected ranking
- ITF = ITF entry
- JE = Junior exempt
- w/o = Walkover
- r = Retired
- d = Defaulted
- SR = Special ranking

=== Finals ===
Semifinals
(Serbia) Miljan Zekić	7^{7}	6
3	(United Kingdom) Aljaž Bedene	6^{2}	4
4	(Czech Republic) Adam Pavlásek	3	6	7^{7}
WC	(Spain) Pablo Andújar	6	3	6^{3}

Final
(Serbia) Miljan Zekić	6	1	4
4	(Czech Republic) Adam Pavlásek	3	6	6

=== Top half ===
First round
1	(Argentina) H Zeballos	6	4
(Austria) B Trinker	2	1^{r}
(Serbia) M Janković	1	5
(Serbia) D Petrović	6	7
Q	(Croatia) F Veger	4	1
(Serbia) M Zekić	6	6
(Australia) C O'Connell	2	2
7	(Serbia) L Đere	6	6
3	(United Kingdom) A Bedene	7^{8}	6
(France) T Lamasine	6^{6}	3
(Austria) D Novak	6	6
PR	(Serbia) N Čačić	4	4
(Czech Republic) V Šafránek	6	6
WC	(Norway) V Durasovic	4	3
WC	(Croatia) A Šančić	4	6^{2}
5	(Spain) R Ramírez Hidalgo	6	7^{7}

Second round
1	(Argentina) H Zeballos	6	4	7
(Serbia) D Petrović	4	6	5
(Serbia) M Zekić	6	5	6
7	(Serbia) L Đere	2	7	3
3	(United Kingdom) A Bedene	6	6
(Austria) D Novak	4	2
(Czech Republic) V Šafránek	7^{7}	6
5	(Spain) R Ramírez Hidalgo	6^{5}	4

Quarterfinals
1	(Argentina) H Zeballos	7^{7}	4	6^{4}
(Serbia) M Zekić	6^{2}	6	7^{7}
3	(United Kingdom) A Bedene	6	6
(Czech Republic) V Šafránek	1	1

Semifinals
(Serbia) M Zekić	7^{7}	6
3	(United Kingdom) A Bedene	6^{2}	4

=== Bottom half ===
First round
6	(Hungary) M Fucsovics	6^{5}	2
(Czech Republic) J Šátral	7^{7}	6
Q	(Austria) S Ofner	3	6^{5}
(Romania) A Ungur	6	7^{7}
Q	(Austria) Lenny Hampel	3	6	7
Q	(Austria) M Neuchrist	6	4	5
WC	(Croatia) N Mektić	6	4	3
4	(Czech Republic) A Pavlásek	3	6	6
8	(Serbia) M Tepavac	6^{3}	2
(Italy) R Bellotti	7^{7}	6
WC	(Spain) P Andújar	6	6
(Romania) D Dima	3	3
(Italy) M Viola	5	5
(Serbia) P Krstin	7	7
(Italy) A Arnaboldi	2	3
2	(Argentina) C Berlocq	6	6

Second round
(Czech Republic) J Šátral	6	6
(Romania) A Ungur	4	4
Q	(Austria) L Hampel	3	7^{7}	2
4	(Czech Republic) A Pavlásek	6	6^{4}	6
(Italy) R Bellotti	6	0	6^{8}
WC	(Spain) P Andújar	2	6	7^{10}
(Serbia) P Krstin	2	2
2	(Argentina) C Berlocq	6	6

Quarterfinals
(Czech Republic) J Šátral	4	4
4	(Czech Republic) A Pavlásek	6	6
WC	(Spain) P Andújar	w/o
2	(Argentina) C Berlocq

Semifinals
4	(Czech Republic) A Pavlásek	3	6	7^{7}
WC	(Spain) P Andújar	6	3	6^{3}
