= 2022 Banja Luka Challenger – Singles =

Singles
- 2022 Banja Luka Challenger

Final
- Champion: (Hungary) Fábián Marozsán
- Runner-up: (Bosnia and Herzegovina) Damir Džumhur
- Score: 6–2, 6–1

Events
Singles	Doubles
← 2021 ·	Banja Luka Challenger	· 2023 →

Juan Manuel Cerúndolo was the defending champion but chose not to defend his title.

Fábián Marozsán won the title after defeating Damir Džumhur 6–2, 6–1 in the final.

== Seeds ==
1. (Spain) Nicolás Álvarez Varona (second round)
2. (Hungary) Fábián Marozsán (champion)
3. (Bosnia and Herzegovina) Damir Džumhur (final)
4. (Spain) Nikolás Sánchez Izquierdo (second round)
5. (Finland) Otto Virtanen (second round)
6. (Portugal) Frederico Ferreira Silva (first round)
7. (Italy) Lorenzo Giustino (first round)
8. (Bosnia and Herzegovina) Mirza Bašić (first round)

== Draw ==
=== Key ===
- Q = Qualifier
- WC = Wild card
- LL = Lucky loser
- Alt = Alternate
- SE = Special exempt
- PR = Protected ranking
- ITF = ITF entry
- JE = Junior exempt
- w/o = Walkover
- r = Retired
- d = Defaulted
- SR = Special ranking

=== Finals ===
Semifinals
(Peru) Nicolás Álvarez	3	2
3/WC	(Bosnia and Herzegovina) Damir Džumhur	6	6
(Sweden) Dragoș Nicolae Mădăraș	3	6	4
2	(Hungary) Fábián Marozsán	6	4	6

Final
3/WC	(Bosnia and Herzegovina) Damir Džumhur	2	1
2	(Hungary) Fábián Marozsán	6	6

=== Top half ===
First round
1	(Spain) N Álvarez Varona	6	6^{3}	6
(Argentina) H Casanova	1	7^{7}	3
Q	(Belgium) K Coppejans	7^{7}	3	7^{8}
Q	(Germany) M Topo	6^{2}	6	6^{6}
(Peru) N Álvarez	4	6	6
Q	(Italy) Alexander Weis	6	2	0
PR	(United Kingdom) J Choinski	6	7^{7}
7	(Italy) L Giustino	2	6^{5}
3/WC	(Bosnia and Herzegovina) D Džumhur	6	6
WC	(Ukraine) Yevhenii Bondarenko	0	1
Q	(Brazil) T Seyboth Wild	6	5	0^{r}
Alt	(Romania) FC Jianu	4	7	1
(Bosnia and Herzegovina) N Fatić	2	6	6
I Gakhov	6	3	4
(France) L Van Assche	3	6^{3}
5	(Finland) O Virtanen	6	7^{7}

Second round
1	(Spain) N Álvarez Varona	4	3
Q	(Belgium) K Coppejans	6	6
(Peru) N Álvarez	1	6	5
PR	(United Kingdom) J Choinski	6	1	2^{r}
3/WC	(Bosnia and Herzegovina) D Džumhur	5	6	7
Alt	(Romania) FC Jianu	7	1	5
(Bosnia and Herzegovina) N Fatić	6	4	6
5	(Finland) O Virtanen	0	6	3

Quarterfinals
Q	(Belgium) K Coppejans	4	2^{r}
(Peru) N Álvarez	6	3
3/WC	(Bosnia and Herzegovina) D Džumhur	7	2
(Bosnia and Herzegovina) N Fatić	5	1^{r}

Semifinals
(Peru) N Álvarez	3	2
3/WC	(Bosnia and Herzegovina) D Džumhur	6	6

=== Bottom half ===
First round
6	(Portugal) F Ferreira Silva	4	6	3
(Chile) G Lama	6	1	6
Q	(Lebanon) B Hassan	4	7^{11}	6
(Austria) L Miedler	6	6^{9}	4
WC	Matvey Minin	3	6	4
(Sweden) DN Mădăraș	6	0	6
Q	(Bosnia and Herzegovina) A Šetkić	4	6	3
4	(Spain) N Sánchez Izquierdo	6	1	6
8	(Bosnia and Herzegovina) M Bašić	6^{7}	2
(Argentina) G Villanueva	7^{9}	6
(Croatia) D Ajduković	6	2	2
A Vatutin	4	6	6
(Norway) V Durasovic	6	6
(Switzerland) J Nikles	0	3
(Germany) S Fanselow	4	3
2	(Hungary) F Marozsán	6	6

Second round
(Chile) G Lama	2	2
Q	(Lebanon) B Hassan	6	6
(Sweden) DN Mădăraș	7^{7}	2	6
4	(Spain) N Sánchez Izquierdo	6^{3}	6	4
(Argentina) G Villanueva	4	0
A Vatutin	6	6
(Norway) V Durasovic	5	3
2	(Hungary) F Marozsán	7	6

Quarterfinals
Q	(Lebanon) B Hassan	4	7	4
(Sweden) DN Mădăraș	6	5	6
A Vatutin	3	2
2	(Hungary) F Marozsán	6	6

Semifinals
(Sweden) DN Mădăraș	3	6	4
2	(Hungary) F Marozsán	6	4	6
