= 2018 Banja Luka Challenger – Doubles =

Doubles
- 2018 Banja Luka Challenger

Final
- Champions: (Slovakia) Andrej Martin; (Chile) Hans Podlipnik Castillo
- Runners-up: (Lithuania) Laurynas Grigelis; (Italy) Alessandro Motti
- Score: 7–5, 4–6, [10–7]

Events
Singles	Doubles
← 2017 ·	Banja Luka Challenger	· 2019 →

Marin and Tomislav Draganja were the defending champions, but only Tomislav chose to defend his title, partnering Alessandro Giannessi. Tomislav Draganja lost in the quarterfinals to Andrej Martin and Hans Podlipnik Castillo.

Martin and Podlipnik Castillo won the title after defeating Laurynas Grigelis and Alessandro Motti 7–5, 4–6, [10–7] in the final.

== Seeds ==
1. (Germany) Kevin Krawietz / (Germany) Andreas Mies (quarterfinals)
2. (Croatia) Ante Pavić / (Croatia) Antonio Šančić (first round)
3. (Italy) Julian Ocleppo / (Italy) Andrea Vavassori (first round)
4. (Serbia) Nikola Ćaćić / (Austria) Tristan-Samuel Weissborn (quarterfinals)

== Draw ==
Key

- Q = Qualifier
- WC = Wild card
- LL = Lucky loser
- Alt = Alternate
- ITF = ITF entry
- PR = Protected ranking
- SR = Special ranking
- SE = Special exempt
- JE = Junior exempt
- JR = Junior Accelerator Programme entrant
- CO = College Accelerator Programme entrant
- NG = Next Gen Accelerator Program entrant
- w/o = Walkover
- r = Retired
- d = Defaulted

First round

Quarterfinals

Semifinals

Final

1
- (Germany) K Krawietz
- (Germany) A Mies
7^{7}
6

- (Argentina) T Lipovšek Puches
- (Argentina) JI Londero
6^{1}
4

1
- (Germany) K Krawietz
- (Germany) A Mies
0
0

WC
(Bosnia and Herzegovina) Stefan Granolić
(Bosnia and Herzegovina) Miloš Milaković
2
0

- (Croatia) I Sabanov
- (Croatia) M Sabanov
6
6

- (Croatia) I Sabanov
- (Croatia) M Sabanov
6
6

- (Croatia) I Sabanov
- (Croatia) M Sabanov
1
3

3
- (Italy) J Ocleppo
- (Italy) A Vavassori
4
3

- (Slovakia) A Martin
- (Chile) H Podlipnik Castillo
6
6

- (Slovakia) A Martin
- (Chile) H Podlipnik Castillo
6
6

- (Slovakia) A Martin
- (Chile) H Podlipnik Castillo
6
4
[10]

- (Argentina) P Cachin
- (Argentina) M Trungelliti
4
6^{4}

- (Croatia) T Draganja
- (Italy) A Giannessi
2
6
[8]

- (Croatia) T Draganja
- (Italy) A Giannessi
6
7^{7}

- (Slovakia) A Martin
- (Chile) H Podlipnik Castillo
7
4
[10]

- (Argentina) C Berlocq
- (Spain) D Marrero
6
6

- (Lithuania) L Grigelis
- (Italy) A Motti
5
6
[7]

WC
(Serbia) Ivan Bjelica
(Serbia) Darko Jandrić
3
4

- (Argentina) C Berlocq
- (Spain) D Marrero
6
7^{9}

- (Spain) R Ojeda Lara
- (Spain) O Roca Batalla
3
1

4
- (Serbia) N Ćaćić
- (Austria) T-S Weissborn
4
6^{7}

4
- (Serbia) N Ćaćić
- (Austria) T-S Weissborn
6
6

- (Argentina) C Berlocq
- (Spain) D Marrero
6^{5}
6^{5}

WC
(Serbia) Vanja Dobrnjac
(Bosnia and Herzegovina) Ivan Randjelović
2
2

- (Lithuania) L Grigelis
- (Italy) A Motti
7^{7}
7^{7}

- (Lithuania) L Grigelis
- (Italy) A Motti
6
6

- (Lithuania) L Grigelis
- (Italy) A Motti
6
7

Alt
- (Bulgaria) D Kuzmanov
- (Peru) JP Varillas
7
1
[10]

Alt
- (Bulgaria) D Kuzmanov
- (Peru) JP Varillas
0
5

2
- (Croatia) A Pavić
- (Croatia) A Šančić
5
6
[2]
