= 2016 Banja Luka Challenger – Doubles =

Doubles
- 2016 Banja Luka Challenger

Final
- Champions: (Czech Republic) Roman Jebavý (Czech Republic) Jan Šátral
- Runners-up: (Italy) Andrea Arnaboldi (Austria) Maximilian Neuchrist
- Score: 7–6^{(7–3)}, 4–6, [10–7]

Events
Singles	Doubles
← 2015 ·	Banja Luka Challenger	· 2017 →

Ilija Bozoljac and Flavio Cipolla were the defending champions but chose not to defend their title.

Roman Jebavý and Jan Šátral won the title after defeating Andrea Arnaboldi and Maximilian Neuchrist 7–6^{(7–3)}, 4–6, [10–7] in the final.

== Seeds ==
1. (Chile) Julio Peralta / (Argentina) Horacio Zeballos (semifinals, withdrew)
2. (Croatia) Nikola Mektić / (Croatia) Antonio Šančić (first round)
3. (Germany) Gero Kretschmer / (Austria) Tristan-Samuel Weissborn (first round)
4. (Uruguay) Ariel Behar / (Serbia) Ilija Vučić (first round)

== Draw ==
=== Key ===
- Q = Qualifier
- WC = Wild card
- LL = Lucky loser
- Alt = Alternate
- SE = Special exempt
- PR = Protected ranking
- ITF = ITF entry
- JE = Junior exempt
- w/o = Walkover
- r = Retired
- d = Defaulted
- SR = Special ranking

First round
1	(Chile) J Peralta (Argentina) H Zeballos	6	6
(Serbia) D Petrović (Czech Republic) V Šafránek	2	4
WC	(United Kingdom) Al Bedene (Slovenia) An Bedene	6	6
(Romania) D Dima (Germany) A Mies	2	4
4	(Uruguay) A Behar (Serbia) Ilija Vučić	3	5
(Italy) A Arnaboldi (Austria) M Neuchrist	6	7
WC	(Croatia) T Draganja (Croatia) F Veger	3	6^{3}
(Hungary) M Fucsovics (Germany) K Krawietz	6	7^{7}
(Serbia) N Čačić (Serbia) M Zekić	7^{7}	5	[9]
(Serbia) M Janković (Serbia) P Krstin	6^{5}	7	[11]
(Czech Republic) R Jebavý (Czech Republic) J Šátral	1	7^{10}	[10]
3	(Germany) G Kretschmer (Austria) T-S Weissborn	6	6^{8}	[4]
(Norway) V Durasovic (Austria) D Pichler	4	6	[6]
WC	(Austria) Lenny Hampel (Austria) S Ofner	6	3	[10]
(Romania) P-A Luncanu (Romania) A Ungur	2	6	[12]
2	(Croatia) N Mektić (Croatia) A Šančić	6	2	[10]

Quarterfinals
1	(Chile) J Peralta (Argentina) H Zeballos	7	6
WC	(United Kingdom) Al Bedene (Slovenia) An Bedene	5	0
(Italy) A Arnaboldi (Austria) M Neuchrist	6	6
(Hungary) M Fucsovics (Germany) K Krawietz	4	3
(Serbia) M Janković (Serbia) P Krstin	4	4
(Czech Republic) R Jebavý (Czech Republic) J Šátral	6	6
WC	(Austria) L Hampel (Austria) S Ofner	2	5
(Romania) P-A Luncanu (Romania) A Ungur	6	7

Semifinals
1	(Chile) J Peralta (Argentina) H Zeballos
(Italy) A Arnaboldi (Austria) M Neuchrist	w/o
(Czech Republic) R Jebavý (Czech Republic) J Šátral	6	6
(Romania) P-A Luncanu (Romania) A Ungur	3	3

Final
(Italy) A Arnaboldi (Austria) M Neuchrist	6^{3}	6	[7]
(Czech Republic) R Jebavý (Czech Republic) J Šátral	7^{7}	4	[10]
