= 2010 Banja Luka Challenger – Singles =

Singles
- 2010 Banja Luka Challenger

Final
- Champion: (Turkey) Marsel İlhan
- Runner-up: (Spain) Pere Riba
- Score: 6–0, 7–6^{(7–4)}

Events
Singles	Doubles
← 2009 ·	Banja Luka Challenger	· 2011 →

Daniel Gimeno-Traver was the defending champion but chose not to compete.
Marsel İlhan defeated Pere Riba 6–0, 7–6^{(7–4)} in the final. Due to rain this match was played on Monday, 20 September 2010 at 11:00 local time.

== Seeds ==
1. (Spain) Pere Riba (final)
2. (Germany) Simon Greul (second round)
3. (Spain) Rubén Ramírez Hidalgo (semifinals)
4. (Germany) Björn Phau (quarterfinals)
5. (Turkey) Marsel İlhan (champion)
6. (Austria) Stefan Koubek (second round)
7. (Spain) Iván Navarro (second round)
8. (Croatia) Franko Škugor (second round)

== Draw ==
=== Key ===
- Q = Qualifier
- WC = Wild card
- LL = Lucky loser
- Alt = Alternate
- SE = Special exempt
- PR = Protected ranking
- ITF = ITF entry
- JE = Junior exempt
- w/o = Walkover
- r = Retired
- d = Defaulted
- SR = Special ranking

=== Finals ===
Semifinals
1	(Spain) Pere Riba	3	6	6
(Czech Republic) Jaroslav Pospíšil	6	3	4
3	(Spain) Rubén Ramírez Hidalgo	7	6^{6}	3
5	(Turkey) Marsel İlhan	5	7	6

Final
1	(Spain) Pere Riba	0	6^{4}
5	(Turkey) Marsel İlhan	6	7

=== Top half ===
First round
1	(Spain) P Riba	6	6
Q	(Romania) C Gârd	1	1
(Spain) P Santos	1	4
(France) J Dasnières de Veigy	6	6
Q	(Bosnia and Herzegovina) M Bašić	3	7	3
(Serbia) F Krajinović	6	5	6
(Spain) G Olaso	6^{4}	3
6	(Austria) S Koubek	7	6
4	(Germany) B Phau	6	6
(Belgium) C Rochus	1	0
Q	(Estonia) J Zopp	7	6
(Hungary) A Balázs	6^{5}	3
(Czech Republic) J Pospíšil	6	6
(France) A Gensse	1	2
WC	(Serbia) M Djokovic	4	6	2
8	(Croatia) F Škugor	6	3	6

Second round
1	(Spain) P Riba	7	7
(France) J Dasnières de Veigy	5	5
(Serbia) F Krajinović	7	6
6	(Austria) S Koubek	5	3
4	(Germany) B Phau	6	6
Q	(Estonia) J Zopp	2	2
(Czech Republic) J Pospíšil	7	6
8	(Croatia) F Škugor	6^{5}	4

Quarterfinals
1	(Spain) P Riba	7	6
(Serbia) F Krajinović	5	1
4	(Germany) B Phau	3	1
(Czech Republic) J Pospíšil	6	6

Semifinals
1	(Spain) P Riba	3	6	6
(Czech Republic) J Pospíšil	6	3	4

=== Bottom half ===
First round
7	(Spain) I Navarro	6	5	6
(Slovakia) M Semjan	4	7	2
(Spain) G Alcaide	6	6
(Croatia) A Veić	2	4
(Croatia) N Mektić	4	3
(Spain) G Trujillo-Soler	6	6
(Italy) S Vagnozzi	3	6	1
3	(Spain) R Ramírez Hidalgo	6	4	6
5	(Turkey) M İlhan	6	6
WC	(Serbia) N Čačić	4	2
(Russia) A Kuznetsov	6	4	4
(Spain) A Menéndez-Maceiras	4	6	6
Q	(Russia) I Belyaev	6	6
WC	(Croatia) R Karanušić	4	2
WC	(Bosnia and Herzegovina) S Lalić	5	0
2	(Germany) S Greul	7	6

Second round
7	(Spain) I Navarro	1	0
(Spain) G Alcaide	6	6
(Spain) G Trujillo-Soler	3	6^{2}
3	(Spain) R Ramírez Hidalgo	6	7
5	(Turkey) M İlhan	6	6
(Spain) A Menéndez-Maceiras	4	2
Q	(Russia) I Belyaev	6	6
2	(Germany) S Greul	3	1

Quarterfinals
(Spain) G Alcaide	5	6^{2}
3	(Spain) R Ramírez Hidalgo	7	7
5	(Turkey) M İlhan	6	6
Q	(Russia) I Belyaev	4	2

Semifinals
3	(Spain) R Ramírez Hidalgo	7	6^{6}	3
5	(Turkey) M İlhan	5	7	6
