= 2019 Banja Luka Challenger =

- Date: 9–15 September
- Edition: 18th
- Surface: Clay
- Location: Banja Luka, Bosnia and Herzegovina

Champions

Singles
- (Netherlands) Tallon Griekspoor

Doubles
- (France) Sadio Doumbia / (France) Fabien Reboul
← 2018 ·	Banja Luka Challenger	· 2021 →

The 2019 Banja Luka Challenger was a professional tennis tournament played on clay courts. It was the eighteenth edition of the tournament which was part of the 2019 ATP Challenger Tour. It took place in Banja Luka, Bosnia and Herzegovina from 9 to 15 September 2019.

== Singles main-draw entrants ==
=== Seeds ===
Country	Player	Rank^{1}	Seed
NED	Robin Haase	143	1
ITA	Filippo Baldi	146	2
SRB	Nikola Milojević	148	3
ARG	Federico Coria	157	4
SVK	Filip Horanský	189	5
IND	Sumit Nagal	190	6
NED	Tallon Griekspoor	194	7
ARG	Carlos Berlocq	199	8
BRA	Rogério Dutra Silva	200	9
SRB	Peđa Krstin	210	10
ARG	Andrea Collarini	219	11
AUS	Christopher O'Connell	221	12
KAZ	Dmitry Popko	236	13
CHI	Alejandro Tabilo	238	14
SRB	Danilo Petrović	247	15
ARG	Facundo Mena	266	16

- ^{1} Rankings are as of 26 August 2019.

=== Other entrants ===
The following players received wildcards into the singles main draw:

- (Germany) Filip Krolo
- (Bosnia and Herzegovina) Nemanja Malešević
- (Serbia) Nikola Milojević
- (Croatia) Matija Pecotić
- (Bosnia and Herzegovina) Goran Radanović

The following player received entry into the singles main draw as an alternate:

- (Spain) Jaume Pla Malfeito

The following players received entry from the qualifying draw:

- (France) Fabien Reboul
- (Croatia) Matej Sabanov

== Champions ==
=== Singles ===
- (Netherlands) Tallon Griekspoor def. (India) Sumit Nagal 6–2, 6–3.

=== Doubles ===
- (France) Sadio Doumbia / (France) Fabien Reboul def. (Peru) Sergio Galdós / (Argentina) Facundo Mena 6–3, 7–6^{(7–4)}.
