= 2010 Banja Luka Challenger =

- Date: 13 – 21 September
- Edition: 9th
- Location: Banja Luka, Bosnia and Herzegovina

Champions

Singles
- (Turkey) Marsel İlhan

Doubles
- (United States) James Cerretani / (Czech Republic) David Škoch
← 2009 ·	Banja Luka Challenger	· 2011 →

The 2010 Banja Luka Challenger was a professional tennis tournament played on outdoor red clay courts. It was the ninth edition of the tournament which was part of the 2010 ATP Challenger Tour. It took place in Banja Luka, Bosnia and Herzegovina between 13 and 21 September 2010.

== ATP entrants ==
=== Seeds ===
Nationality	Player	Ranking*	Seeding
ESP	Pere Riba	76	1
GER	Simon Greul	84	2
ESP	Rubén Ramírez Hidalgo	92	3
GER	Björn Phau	97	4
TUR	Marsel İlhan	110	5
AUT	Stefan Koubek	138	6
ESP	Iván Navarro	160	7
CRO	Franko Škugor	174	8

- Rankings are as of August 30, 2010.

=== Other entrants ===
The following players received wildcards into the singles main draw:

- (Serbia) Nikola Čačić
- (Serbia) Marko Djokovic
- (Croatia) Roko Karanušić
- (Bosnia and Herzegovina) Sven Lalić

The following players received entry from the qualifying draw:

- (Bosnia and Herzegovina) Mirza Bašić
- (Russia) Ilya Belyaev
- (Romania) Cătălin Gârd
- (Estonia) Jürgen Zopp

== Champions ==
=== Singles ===
(Turkey) Marsel İlhan def. (Spain) Pere Riba, 6–0, 7–6(4)

=== Doubles ===
(United States) James Cerretani / (Czech Republic) David Škoch def. (Canada) Adil Shamasdin / (Croatia) Lovro Zovko, 6–1, 6–4
