= 2014 Banja Luka Challenger =

- Date: 8–14 September
- Edition: 13th
- Surface: Clay
- Location: Banja Luka, Bosnia and Herzegovina

Champions

Singles
- (Serbia) Viktor Troicki

Doubles
- (Croatia) Dino Marcan / (Croatia) Antonio Šančić
← 2013 ·	Banja Luka Challenger	· 2015 →

The 2014 Banja Luka Challenger was a professional tennis tournament played on clay courts. It was the thirteenth edition of the tournament which was part of the 2014 ATP Challenger Tour. It took place in Banja Luka, Bosnia and Herzegovina from 8 to 14 September 2014.

== Singles main-draw entrants ==
=== Seeds ===
Country	Player	Rank^{1}	Seed
SLO	Blaž Rola	87	1
ESP	Albert Ramos	95	2
AUT	Andreas Haider-Maurer	110	3
SLO	Aljaž Bedene	133	4
CRO	Ante Pavić	138	5
USA	Chase Buchanan	158	6
CZE	Jaroslav Pospíšil	195	7
CRO	Nikola Mektić	218	8

- ^{1} Rankings are as of September 1, 2014.

=== Other entrants ===
The following players received wildcards into the singles main draw:

- (Serbia) Marko Djokovic
- (Serbia) Nikola Milojević
- (Serbia) Marko Tepavac
- (Serbia) Miljan Zekić

The following players received entry from the qualifying draw:

- (Slovakia) Filip Horanský
- (Germany) Yannick Maden
- (France) Gleb Sakharov
- (Croatia) Antonio Šančić

== Champions ==
=== Singles ===
- (Serbia) Viktor Troicki def. (Spain) Albert Ramos, 7–5, 4–6, 7–5

=== Doubles ===
- (Croatia) Dino Marcan / (Croatia) Antonio Šančić def. (Czech Republic) Jaroslav Pospíšil / (Slovakia) Adrian Sikora, 7–5, 6–4
