= 2012 Banja Luka Challenger =

- Date: 10–16 September
- Edition: 11th
- Surface: Clay
- Location: Banja Luka, Bosnia and Herzegovina

Champions

Singles
- (Romania) Victor Hănescu

Doubles
- (Croatia) Marin Draganja / (Croatia) Lovro Zovko
← 2011 ·	Banja Luka Challenger	· 2013 →

The 2012 Banja Luka Challenger was a professional tennis tournament played on clay courts. It was the eleventh edition of the tournament which was part of the 2012 ATP Challenger Tour. It took place in Banja Luka, Bosnia and Herzegovina between 10 and 16 September 2012.

== Singles main draw entrants ==
=== Seeds ===
Country	Player	Rank^{1}	Seed
SVN	Blaž Kavčič	77	1
GER	Björn Phau	83	2
ROU	Victor Hănescu	102	3
CRO	Antonio Veić	135	4
SRB	Dušan Lajović	137	5
FRA	Jonathan Dasnières de Veigy	153	6
AUT	Andreas Haider-Maurer	156	7
SVK	Pavol Červenák	177	8

- ^{1} Rankings are as of August 27, 2012.

=== Other entrants ===
The following players received wildcards into the singles main draw:

- (Bosnia and Herzegovina) Tomislav Brkić
- (Serbia) Nikola Čačić
- (Serbia) Marko Djokovic
- (Austria) Bastian Trinker

The following players received entry from the qualifying draw:

- (Poland) Marcin Gawron
- (Spain) Carlos Gómez-Herrera
- (Germany) Steven Moneke
- (Ukraine) Artem Smirnov

== Champions ==
=== Singles ===
- (Romania) Victor Hănescu def. (Austria) Andreas Haider-Maurer, 6–4, 6–1

=== Doubles ===
- (Croatia) Marin Draganja / (Croatia) Lovro Zovko def. (Australia) Colin Ebelthite / (Czech Republic) Jaroslav Pospíšil, 6–1, 6–1
