= 2023 Banja Luka Challenger – Singles =

Singles
- 2023 Banja Luka Challenger

Final
- Champion: (Croatia) Dino Prižmić
- Runner-up: (Belgium) Kimmer Coppejans
- Score: 6–2, 6–3

Events
Singles	Doubles
← 2022 ·	Banja Luka Challenger	· 2024 →

Fábián Marozsán was the defending champion but withdrew before his semifinal match against Dino Prižmić.

Prižmić won the title after defeating Kimmer Coppejans 6–2, 6–3 in the final.

== Seeds ==
1. (Hungary) Fábián Marozsán (semifinals, withdrew)
2. (Italy) Marco Cecchinato (first round)
3. (Slovakia) Alex Molčan (second round)
4. (France) Benoît Paire (second round)
5. (Belgium) Kimmer Coppejans (final)
6. (Argentina) Mariano Navone (second round)
7. (Czech Republic) Zdeněk Kolář (first round)
8. (Bosnia and Herzegovina) Damir Džumhur (quarterfinals)

== Draw ==
=== Key ===
- Q = Qualifier
- WC = Wild card
- LL = Lucky loser
- Alt = Alternate
- SE = Special exempt
- PR = Protected ranking
- ITF = ITF entry
- JE = Junior exempt
- w/o = Walkover
- r = Retired
- d = Defaulted
- SR = Special ranking

=== Finals ===
Semifinals
1	(Hungary) Fábián Marozsán
(Croatia) Dino Prižmić	w/o
5	(Belgium) Kimmer Coppejans	6	6
Q	(Germany) Marko Topo	0	1

Final
(Croatia) Dino Prižmić	6	6
5	(Belgium) Kimmer Coppejans	2	3

=== Top half ===
First round
1	(Hungary) F Marozsán	3	6	6
(Norway) V Durasovic	6	0	3
(France) C Tabur	7^{7}	7^{7}
(North Macedonia) K Ivanovski	6^{4}	6^{3}
WC	(Bosnia and Herzegovina) A Nedić	7	6^{4}	3
(Spain) J Barranco Cosano	5	7^{7}	6
Alt	(France) K Jacquet	6	3	3
6	(Argentina) M Navone	3	6	6
3/WC	(Slovakia) A Molčan	6	6
Q	(Serbia) M Zekić	1	2
Q	(Australia) A Santillan	6	3	3^{r}
(Croatia) D Prižmić	2	6	5
(Spain) N Sánchez Izquierdo	4	5
(Croatia) D Ajduković	6	7
(Australia) M Polmans	3	1
8	(Bosnia and Herzegovina) D Džumhur	6	6

Second round
1	(Hungary) F Marozsán	6	6
(France) C Tabur	3	2
(Spain) J Barranco Cosano	6	7^{7}
6	(Argentina) M Navone	2	6^{5}
3/WC	(Slovakia) A Molčan	1	4
(Croatia) D Prižmić	6	6
(Croatia) D Ajduković	2	5
8	(Bosnia and Herzegovina) D Džumhur	6	7

Quarterfinals
1	(Hungary) F Marozsán	6	6
(Spain) J Barranco Cosano	2	0
(Croatia) D Prižmić	6	6
8	(Bosnia and Herzegovina) D Džumhur	3	4

Semifinals
1	(Hungary) F Marozsán
(Croatia) D Prižmić	w/o

=== Bottom half ===
First round
5	(Belgium) K Coppejans	6	6
Q	(Bosnia and Herzegovina) M Bašić	3	4
(Bosnia and Herzegovina) N Fatić	3	0^{r}
(Croatia) N Serdarušić	6	0
(Romania) FC Jianu	6^{0}	2
(Slovakia) N Gombos	7^{7}	6
Q	(Bosnia and Herzegovina) A Šetkić	2	5
4	(France) B Paire	6	7
7	(Czech Republic) Z Kolář	4	4
Q	(Ukraine) Eric Vanshelboim	6	6
SE	(United States) T Kodat	6	6
SE	(France) U Blanchet	4	3
Q	(Germany) M Topo	6	6
(France) G Blancaneaux	0	2
(Sweden) DN Mădăraș	6	6
2/WC	(Italy) M Cecchinato	2	1

Second round
5	(Belgium) K Coppejans	6^{7}	6	7
(Croatia) N Serdarušić	7^{9}	3	5
(Slovakia) N Gombos	6	6
4	(France) B Paire	4	2
Q	(Ukraine) E Vanshelboim	5	1
SE	(United States) T Kodat	7	6
Q	(Germany) M Topo	6	6
(Sweden) DN Mădăraș	3	4

Quarterfinals
5	(Belgium) K Coppejans	3
(Slovakia) N Gombos	5^{r}
SE	(United States) T Kodat	3	3
Q	(Germany) M Topo	6	6

Semifinals
5	(Belgium) K Coppejans	6	6
Q	(Germany) M Topo	0	1
