= 2011 Banja Luka Challenger – Doubles =

Doubles
- 2011 Banja Luka Challenger

Final
- Champions: (Italy) Marco Crugnola (Spain) Rubén Ramírez Hidalgo
- Runners-up: (Czech Republic) Jan Mertl (Netherlands) Matwé Middelkoop
- Score: 7–6^{(7–3)}, 3–6, [10–8]

Events
Singles	Doubles
- Banja Luka Challenger

James Cerretani and David Škoch were the defending champions but decided not to participate.

Marco Crugnola and Rubén Ramírez Hidalgo won the tournament. They defeated Jan Mertl and Matwé Middelkoop 7–6^{(7–3)}, 3–6, [10–8] in the final.

== Seeds ==
1. (Italy) Flavio Cipolla / (Italy) Simone Vagnozzi (first round)
2. (Croatia) Dino Marcan / (Croatia) Lovro Zovko (semifinals)
3. (Germany) Michael Kohlmann / (Germany) Alexander Waske (quarterfinals)
4. (Italy) Marco Crugnola / (Spain) Rubén Ramírez Hidalgo (champions)

== Draw ==
Key

- Q = Qualifier
- WC = Wild card
- LL = Lucky loser
- Alt = Alternate
- ITF = ITF entry
- PR = Protected ranking
- SR = Special ranking
- SE = Special exempt
- JE = Junior exempt
- JR = Junior Accelerator Programme entrant
- CO = College Accelerator Programme entrant
- NG = Next Gen Accelerator Program entrant
- w/o = Walkover
- r = Retired
- d = Defaulted

=== Draw ===
First round
1	(Italy) F Cipolla (Italy) S Vagnozzi	3	4
(Slovenia) A Bedene (Slovenia) G Žemlja	6	6
(Slovenia) B Kavčič (Czech Republic) J Pospíšil	7	6
WC	(Bosnia and Herzegovina) M Bašić (Bosnia and Herzegovina) T Brkić	5	4
3	(Germany) M Kohlmann (Germany) A Waske	6	6
Alt	(Slovenia) Andraz Bedene (Slovenia) Mike Urbanija	3	4
(Czech Republic) J Mertl (Netherlands) M Middelkoop	6	6
WC	(Croatia) M Hižak (Croatia) Ante Pavić	4	2
(Spain) P Carreño-Busta (Spain) P Riba	6	6^{3}	[10]
(Spain) D Gimeno-Traver (Spain) I Navarro	1	7^{7}	[7]
(Croatia) T Androić (Serbia) N Čačić	4	5
4	(Italy) M Crugnola (Spain) R Ramírez Hidalgo	6	7
(Czech Republic) D Lojda (France) M Teixeira
WC	(Bosnia and Herzegovina) Aleksandar Marić (Montenegro) G Tošić	w/o
(Slovakia) K Čapkovič (Brazil) F Romboli	1	3
2	(Croatia) D Marcan (Croatia) L Zovko	6	6

Quarterfinals
(Slovenia) A Bedene (Slovenia) G Žemlja	2	6	[5]
(Slovenia) B Kavčič (Czech Republic) J Pospíšil	6	2	[10]
3	(Germany) M Kohlmann (Germany) A Waske	6^{0}	4
(Czech Republic) J Mertl (Netherlands) M Middelkoop	7^{7}	6
(Spain) P Carreño-Busta (Spain) P Riba	6	3	[5]
4	(Italy) M Crugnola (Spain) R Ramírez Hidalgo	3	6	[10]
WC	(Bosnia and Herzegovina) A Marić (Montenegro) G Tošić	3	2
2	(Croatia) D Marcan (Croatia) L Zovko	6	6

Semifinals
(Slovenia) B Kavčič (Czech Republic) J Pospíšil	7	5	[9]
(Czech Republic) J Mertl (Netherlands) M Middelkoop	5	7	[11]
4	(Italy) M Crugnola (Spain) R Ramírez Hidalgo	6	6
2	(Croatia) D Marcan (Croatia) L Zovko	1	4

Final
(Czech Republic) J Mertl (Netherlands) M Middelkoop	6^{3}	6	[8]
4	(Italy) M Crugnola (Spain) R Ramírez Hidalgo	7^{7}	3	[10]
