= 2009 Banja Luka Challenger – Singles =

Singles
- 2009 Banja Luka Challenger

Final
- Champion: (Spain) Daniel Gimeno-Traver
- Runner-up: (Germany) Julian Reister
- Score: 6–4, 6–1

Events
Singles	Doubles
← 2008 ·	Banja Luka Challenger	· 2010 →

Ilija Bozoljac chose to not defend his 2008 title.
1st-seeded Daniel Gimeno-Traver defeated 6th-seeded Julian Reister 6–4, 6–1 in the final.

== Seeds ==
1. (Spain) Daniel Gimeno-Traver (champion)
2. (Spain) Iván Navarro (second round)
3. (France) Laurent Recouderc (second round)
4. (Spain) Pere Riba (second round)
5. (France) Stéphane Robert (quarterfinals)
6. (Germany) Julian Reister (final)
7. (Monaco) Jean-René Lisnard (second round)
8. (Slovakia) Kamil Čapkovič (first round, retired due to right ankle injury)

== Draw ==
=== Key ===
- Q = Qualifier
- WC = Wild card
- LL = Lucky loser
- Alt = Alternate
- SE = Special exempt
- PR = Protected ranking
- ITF = ITF entry
- JE = Junior exempt
- w/o = Walkover
- r = Retired
- d = Defaulted
- SR = Special ranking

=== Final four ===
Semifinals
1	(Spain) Daniel Gimeno-Traver	6	6
(Germany) Tobias Kamke	2	3
(Czech Republic) Dušan Lojda	2	0
6	(Germany) Julian Reister	6	6

Final
1	(Spain) Daniel Gimeno-Traver	6	6
6	(Germany) Julian Reister	4	1

=== Top half ===
First round
1	(Spain) D Gimeno-Traver	6	6
WC	(Bosnia and Herzegovina) A Marić	4	4
(Serbia) F Krajinović	6	6
(Russia) M Elgin	3	0
WC	(Bosnia and Herzegovina) M Stanić	1	0
Q	(Slovakia) M Semjan	6	6
Q	(Romania) C Gârd	1	1
5	(France) S Robert	6	6
3	(France) L Recouderc	6	7
(Germany) D Kindlmann	2	6^{6}
(Spain) M López	6^{2}	6	5
(Germany) T Kamke	7	1	7
(Romania) A Cruciat	3	6^{7}
(Russia) V Rudnev	6	7
(Spain) MÁ López Jaén	6	1	4
7	(Monaco) J-R Lisnard	4	6	6

Second round
1	(Spain) D Gimeno-Traver	6^{3}	6	7
(Serbia) F Krajinović	7	1	6^{5}
Q	(Slovakia) M Semjan	0	5
5	(France) S Robert	6	7
3	(France) L Recouderc	3	6	2
(Germany) T Kamke	6	4	6
(Russia) V Rudnev	7	6
7	(Monaco) J-R Lisnard	6^{5}	4

Quarterfinals
1	(Spain) D Gimeno-Traver	6	6
5	(France) S Robert	2	2
(Germany) T Kamke	6	6
(Russia) V Rudnev	1	1

Semifinals
1	(Spain) D Gimeno-Traver	6	6
(Germany) T Kamke	2	3

=== Bottom half ===
First round
8	(Slovakia) K Čapkovič	0	1	r
(Netherlands) M Middelkoop	6	1
WC	(Serbia) A Zlatanović	2	3
(Monaco) B Balleret	6	6
(Czech Republic) D Lojda	6	6
WC	(Bosnia and Herzegovina) S Lalić	0	0
(Austria) R Eitzinger	3	0
4	(Spain) P Riba	6	6
6	(Germany) J Reister	6	2	6
(Czech Republic) J Minář	4	6	2
Q	(Hungary) A Balázs	2	4
(Germany) S Stadler	6	6
Q	(Montenegro) G Tošić	7	6
(Italy) S Vagnozzi	6^{5}	0
(Jamaica) D Brown	4	3
2	(Spain) I Navarro	6	6

Second round
(Netherlands) M Middelkoop	6	6
(Monaco) B Balleret	4	3
(Czech Republic) D Lojda	7	6
4	(Spain) P Riba	6^{2}	4
6	(Germany) J Reister	6	6
(Germany) S Stadler	2	4
Q	(Montenegro) G Tošić	7	6
2	(Spain) I Navarro	5	2

Quarterfinals
(Netherlands) M Middelkoop	w/o
(Czech Republic) D Lojda
6	(Germany) J Reister	6	6
Q	(Montenegro) G Tošić	4	3

Semifinals
(Czech Republic) D Lojda	2	0
6	(Germany) J Reister	6	6
