= 2013 Banja Luka Challenger – Doubles =

Doubles
- 2013 Banja Luka Challenger

Final
- Champions: (Croatia) Marin Draganja (Croatia) Nikola Mektić
- Runners-up: (Germany) Dominik Meffert (Ukraine) Oleksandr Nedovyesov
- Score: 6–4, 3–6, [10–6]

Events
Singles	Doubles
← 2012 ·	Banja Luka Challenger	· 2014 →

Marin Draganja and Nikola Mektić won the title, beating Dominik Meffert and Oleksandr Nedovyesov 6–4, 3–6, [10–6]

== Seeds ==
1. (Australia) Rameez Junaid / (Slovakia) Igor Zelenay (first round)
2. (Germany) Dominik Meffert / (Ukraine) Oleksandr Nedovyesov (final)
3. (Serbia) Nikola Ćirić / (Serbia) Goran Tošić (semifinals)
4. (Croatia) Marin Draganja / (Croatia) Nikola Mektić (champions)

== Draw ==
=== Key ===
- Q = Qualifier
- WC = Wild card
- LL = Lucky loser
- Alt = Alternate
- ITF = ITF entry
- PR = Protected ranking
- SR = Special ranking
- SE = Special exempt
- JE = Junior exempt
- JR = Junior Accelerator Programme entrant
- CO = College Accelerator Programme entrant
- NG = Next Gen Accelerator Program entrant
- w/o = Walkover
- r = Retired
- d = Defaulted

=== Draw ===
First round
1	(Australia) R Junaid (Slovakia) I Zelenay	4	6	[5]
(Croatia) K Mesaroš (Argentina) DS Schwartzman	6	2	[10]
WC	(Serbia) Ivan Bjelica (Serbia) D Djokovic	4	2
Alt	(Netherlands) Romano Frantzen (Netherlands) T Schoorel	6	6
4	(Croatia) M Draganja (Croatia) N Mektić	6^{4}	6	[10]
(Czech Republic) J Mertl (Czech Republic) J Pospíšil	7^{7}	4	[7]
(Croatia) A Pavić (Croatia) F Škugor	6	6
WC	(Bosnia and Herzegovina) N Fatić (Bosnia and Herzegovina) I Gorčić	4	2
(Greece) T Angelinos (Serbia) M Zekić	3	2
(Slovakia) N Gombos (Slovakia) M Semjan	6	6
(Italy) M Cecchinato (Italy) S Vagnozzi	2	6	[5]
3	(Serbia) N Ćirić (Serbia) G Tošić	6	4	[10]
WC	(Serbia) N Čačić (Croatia) M Delić	3	3
(Poland) Piotr Gadomski (Poland) G Panfil	6	6
(Slovenia) A Bedene (Bosnia and Herzegovina) D Džumhur	2	3
2	(Germany) D Meffert (Ukraine) O Nedovyesov	6	6

Quarterfinals
(Croatia) K Mesaroš (Argentina) DS Schwartzman	w/o
Alt	(Netherlands) R Frantzen (Netherlands) T Schoorel
4	(Croatia) M Draganja (Croatia) N Mektić	6	7^{7}
(Croatia) A Pavić (Croatia) F Škugor	2	6^{3}
(Slovakia) N Gombos (Slovakia) M Semjan	2	3
3	(Serbia) N Ćirić (Serbia) G Tošić	6	6
(Poland) P Gadomski (Poland) G Panfil	4	3
2	(Germany) D Meffert (Ukraine) O Nedovyesov	6	6

Semifinals
Alt	(Netherlands) R Frantzen (Netherlands) T Schoorel	4	2
4	(Croatia) M Draganja (Croatia) N Mektić	6	6
3	(Serbia) N Ćirić (Serbia) G Tošić	5	3
2	(Germany) D Meffert (Ukraine) O Nedovyesov	7	6

Final
4	(Croatia) M Draganja (Croatia) N Mektić	6	3	[10]
2	(Germany) D Meffert (Ukraine) O Nedovyesov	4	6	[6]
