= 2023 Banja Luka Challenger – Doubles =

Doubles
- 2023 Banja Luka Challenger

Final
- Champions: (Romania) Victor Vlad Cornea (Austria) Philipp Oswald
- Runners-up: (Kazakhstan) Andrey Golubev (Ukraine) Denys Molchanov
- Score: 3–6, 6–1, [15–13]

Events
Singles	Doubles
← 2022 ·	Banja Luka Challenger	· 2024 →

Vladyslav Manafov and Oleg Prihodko were the defending champions but they chose to defend their title with different partners. Manafov partnered Ivan Liutarevich but lost in the first round to Andrey Golubev and Denys Molchanov. Prihodko partnered Denis Klok but lost in the first round to Viktor Durasovic and Akira Santillan.

Victor Vlad Cornea and Philipp Oswald won the title after defeating Golubev and Molchanov 3–6, 6–1, [15–13] in the final.

== Seeds ==
1. (Romania) Victor Vlad Cornea / (Austria) Philipp Oswald (champions)
2. (Kazakhstan) Andrey Golubev / (Ukraine) Denys Molchanov (final)
3. (Germany) Constantin Frantzen / (Czech Republic) Petr Nouza (semifinals)
4. (Bolivia) Boris Arias / (Bolivia) Federico Zeballos (semifinals)

== Draw ==
=== Key ===
- Q = Qualifier
- WC = Wild card
- LL = Lucky loser
- Alt = Alternate
- SE = Special exempt
- PR = Protected ranking
- ITF = ITF entry
- JE = Junior exempt
- w/o = Walkover
- r = Retired
- d = Defaulted
- SR = Special ranking

First round
1	(Romania) VV Cornea (Austria) P Oswald	6	5	[10]
(Czech Republic) Z Kolář (Croatia) N Serdarušić	3	7	[8]
WC	(Bosnia and Herzegovina) Vladan Tadić (Germany) M Topo	6	6
(Israel) R Stepanov (United States) Tennyson Whiting	1	4
4	(Bolivia) B Arias (Bolivia) F Zeballos	6	6^{6}	[14]
(Serbia) I Sabanov (Serbia) M Sabanov	3	7^{8}	[12]
(Norway) V Durasovic (Australia) A Santillan	6	6
Denis Klok (Ukraine) O Prihodko	3	4
(Bosnia and Herzegovina) M Bašić (Bosnia and Herzegovina) N Fatić	6	6
WC	(Bosnia and Herzegovina) A Šetkić (Serbia) N Zimonjić	2	2
(Austria) N Oberleitner (United Kingdom) M Whitehouse	3	6	[2]
3	(Germany) C Frantzen (Czech Republic) P Nouza	6	4	[10]
(Sweden) DN Mădăraș (Ukraine) Eric Vanshelboim	6	6
(Romania) FC Jianu (Spain) N Sánchez Izquierdo	3	3
I Liutarevich (Ukraine) V Manafov	3	3
2	(Kazakhstan) A Golubev (Ukraine) D Molchanov	6	6

Quarterfinals
1	(Romania) VV Cornea (Austria) P Oswald	6	6
WC	(Bosnia and Herzegovina) V Tadić (Germany) M Topo	3	0
4	(Bolivia) B Arias (Bolivia) F Zeballos	6	3	[10]
(Norway) V Durasovic (Australia) A Santillan	4	6	[6]
(Bosnia and Herzegovina) M Bašić (Bosnia and Herzegovina) N Fatić	3	4
3	(Germany) C Frantzen (Czech Republic) P Nouza	6	6
(Sweden) DN Mădăraș (Ukraine) E Vanshelboim	2	1
2	(Kazakhstan) A Golubev (Ukraine) D Molchanov	6	6

Semifinals
1	(Romania) VV Cornea (Austria) P Oswald	6	6
4	(Bolivia) B Arias (Bolivia) F Zeballos	4	3
3	(Germany) C Frantzen (Czech Republic) P Nouza	3	2
2	(Kazakhstan) A Golubev (Ukraine) D Molchanov	6	6

Final
1	(Romania) VV Cornea (Austria) P Oswald	3	6	[15]
2	(Kazakhstan) A Golubev (Ukraine) D Molchanov	6	1	[13]
