= 2021 Banja Luka Challenger – Doubles =

Doubles
- 2021 Banja Luka Challenger

Final
- Champions: (Croatia) Antonio Šančić (Croatia) Nino Serdarušić
- Runners-up: (Croatia) Ivan Sabanov (Croatia) Matej Sabanov
- Score: 6–3, 6–3

Events
Singles	Doubles
- Banja Luka Challenger

Sadio Doumbia and Fabien Reboul were the defending champions but chose not to defend their title.

Antonio Šančić and Nino Serdarušić won the title after defeating Ivan and Matej Sabanov 6–3, 6–3 in the final.

== Seeds ==
1. (Croatia) Ivan Sabanov / (Croatia) Matej Sabanov (final)
2. (France) Manuel Guinard / (Switzerland) Luca Margaroli (first round, withdrew)
3. (Czech Republic) Zdeněk Kolář / (Ukraine) Vitaliy Sachko (semifinals)
4. (United States) James Cerretani / (Germany) Fabian Fallert (semifinals)

== Draw ==
Key

- Q = Qualifier
- WC = Wild card
- LL = Lucky loser
- Alt = Alternate
- ITF = ITF entry
- PR = Protected ranking
- SR = Special ranking
- SE = Special exempt
- JE = Junior exempt
- JR = Junior Accelerator Programme entrant
- CO = College Accelerator Programme entrant
- NG = Next Gen Accelerator Program entrant
- w/o = Walkover
- r = Retired
- d = Defaulted

First round
1	(Croatia) I Sabanov (Croatia) M Sabanov	6	6
WC	(Bosnia and Herzegovina) Vladan Tadić (Serbia) M Topo	2	2
(United States) V Kirkov (Bulgaria) D Kuzmanov	7^{7}	4	[8]
(Romania) A Jecan (Romania) Dan Alexandru Tomescu	6^{1}	6	[10]
3	(Czech Republic) Z Kolář (Ukraine) V Sachko	w/o
(Spain) C Gómez-Herrera (Serbia) P Krstin
(Italy) M Bortolotti (Uruguay) M Cuevas	6	6
(Sweden) M Eriksson (Sweden) DN Mădăraș	1	2
(Moldova) A Cozbinov (Tunisia) M Echargui	7	6
(Serbia) N Milojević (Bosnia and Herzegovina) A Šetkić	5	1
(Italy) Davide Pozzi (Italy) Alexander Weis	4	6^{3}
4	(United States) J Cerretani (Germany) F Fallert	6	7^{7}
(Czech Republic) V Kopřiva (Czech Republic) D Poljak	7^{7}	6
WC	(Bosnia and Herzegovina) Danijal Muminović (Bosnia and Herzegovina) Dražen Petrović	6^{5}	3
(Croatia) A Šančić (Croatia) N Serdarušić	w/o
2	(France) M Guinard (Switzerland) L Margaroli

Quarterfinals
1	(Croatia) I Sabanov (Croatia) M Sabanov	6	6
(Romania) A Jecan (Romania) DA Tomescu	3	3
3	(Czech Republic) Z Kolář (Ukraine) V Sachko	6	2	[11]
(Italy) M Bortolotti (Uruguay) M Cuevas	3	6	[9]
(Moldova) A Cozbinov (Tunisia) M Echargui	6^{4}	5
4	(United States) J Cerretani (Germany) F Fallert	7^{7}	7
(Czech Republic) V Kopřiva (Czech Republic) D Poljak	1	7^{7}	[10]
(Croatia) A Šančić (Croatia) N Serdarušić	6	6^{4}	[12]

Semifinals
1	(Croatia) I Sabanov (Croatia) M Sabanov	2	6	[10]
3	(Czech Republic) Z Kolář (Ukraine) V Sachko	6	3	[6]
4	(United States) J Cerretani (Germany) F Fallert	6^{5}	3
(Croatia) A Šančić (Croatia) N Serdarušić	7^{7}	6

Final
1	(Croatia) I Sabanov (Croatia) M Sabanov	3	3
(Croatia) A Šančić (Croatia) N Serdarušić	6	6
