= 2012 Banja Luka Challenger – Singles =

Singles
- 2012 Banja Luka Challenger

Final
- Champion: (Romania) Victor Hănescu
- Runner-up: (Austria) Andreas Haider-Maurer
- Score: 6–4, 6–1

Events
Singles	Doubles
- Banja Luka Challenger

Blaž Kavčič was the defending champion, but retired from his first round match with a back injury.
Victor Hănescu won the title, defeating Andreas Haider-Maurer 6–4, 6–1 in the final.

== Seeds ==
1. (Slovenia) Blaž Kavčič (first round, retired because of a back injury)
2. (Germany) Björn Phau (second round, withdrew because of a back injury)
3. (Romania) Victor Hănescu (champion)
4. (Croatia) Antonio Veić (second round)
5. (Serbia) Dušan Lajović (second round)
6. (France) Jonathan Dasnières de Veigy (first round)
7. (Austria) Andreas Haider-Maurer (final)
8. (Slovakia) Pavol Červenák (first round)

== Draw ==
Key

- Q = Qualifier
- WC = Wild card
- LL = Lucky loser
- Alt = Alternate
- ITF = ITF entry
- PR = Protected ranking
- SR = Special ranking
- SE = Special exempt
- JE = Junior exempt
- JR = Junior Accelerator Programme entrant
- CO = College Accelerator Programme entrant
- NG = Next Gen Accelerator Program entrant
- w/o = Walkover
- r = Retired
- d = Defaulted

=== Finals ===
Semifinals
(Italy) Simone Vagnozzi	4	5
3	(Romania) Victor Hănescu	6	7
7	(Austria) Andreas Haider-Maurer	6	6
(Ukraine) Ivan Sergeyev	2	3

Final
3	(Romania) Victor Hănescu	6	6
7	(Austria) Andreas Haider-Maurer	4	1

=== Top half ===
First round
1	(Slovenia) B Kavčič	5	6	2^{r}
Q	(Germany) Steven Moneke	7	3	3
(Croatia) F Škugor	7^{7}	6
WC	(Serbia) M Djokovic	6^{4}	2
Q	(Netherlands) van der Duim	6	6
(Austria) M Linzer	3	1
(Italy) S Vagnozzi	6	6
6	(France) J Dasnières de Veigy	3	0
3	(Romania) V Hănescu	6	6
(Spain) J Checa-Calvo	3	1
(Bosnia and Herzegovina) A Šetkić	6^{3}	6	7
(Czech Republic) J Mertl	7^{7}	2	5
(Croatia) N Mektić	6	7^{7}
WC	(Serbia) N Čačić	2	6^{4}
(Netherlands) B Westerhof	4	7	6
8	(Slovakia) P Červenák	6	5	3

Second round
Q	(Germany) Steven Moneke	6	6
(Croatia) F Škugor	3	4
Q	(Netherlands) van der Duim	2	r
(Italy) S Vagnozzi	6
3	(Romania) V Hănescu	7^{7}	6
(Bosnia and Herzegovina) A Šetkić	6^{4}	2
(Croatia) N Mektić	7^{17}	4	7^{9}
(Netherlands) B Westerhof	6^{15}	6	6^{7}

Quarterfinals
Q	(Germany) Steven Moneke	6^{0}	3
(Italy) S Vagnozzi	7^{7}	6
3	(Romania) V Hănescu	6	6
(Croatia) N Mektić	0	2

Semifinals
(Italy) S Vagnozzi	4	5
3	(Romania) V Hănescu	6	7

=== Bottom half ===
First round
7	(Austria) A Haider-Maurer	6	6
(Bosnia and Herzegovina) D Džumhur	3	2
(Slovakia) K Čapkovič	6	3	4
WC	(Bosnia and Herzegovina) T Brkić	4	6	6
(Netherlands) M Middelkoop	4	1
(Germany) S Greul	6	6
Q	(Ukraine) A Smirnov	4	0
4	(Croatia) A Veić	6	6
5	(Serbia) D Lajović	6	6
WC	(Austria) B Trinker	4	3
(Ukraine) I Sergeyev	6	6
(Hungary) A Balázs	3	2
(Germany) P Torebko	4	6	6
Q	(Spain) C Gómez-Herrera	6	1	2
(Croatia) D Marcan	4	6^{6}
2	(Germany) B Phau	6	7^{8}

Second round
7	(Austria) A Haider-Maurer	6	6
WC	(Bosnia and Herzegovina) T Brkić	1	4
(Germany) S Greul	7	6
4	(Croatia) A Veić	5	0
5	(Serbia) D Lajović	7^{7}	2	5
(Ukraine) I Sergeyev	6^{2}	6	7
(Germany) P Torebko	w/o
2	(Germany) B Phau

Quarterfinals
7	(Austria) A Haider-Maurer	6	6
(Germany) S Greul	3	4
(Ukraine) I Sergeyev	3	6	6
(Germany) P Torebko	6	2	3

Semifinals
7	(Austria) A Haider-Maurer	6	6
(Ukraine) I Sergeyev	2	3
