= 2009 Banja Luka Challenger =

- Date: 14 – 20 September
- Edition: 8th
- Location: Banja Luka, Bosnia and Herzegovina

Champions

Singles
- (Spain) Daniel Gimeno-Traver

Doubles
- (Jamaica) Dustin Brown / (Austria) Rainer Eitzinger
← 2008 ·	Banja Luka Challenger	· 2010 →

The 2009 Banja Luka Challenger was a professional tennis tournament played on outdoor red clay courts. It was the eighth edition of the tournament which was part of the 2009 ATP Challenger Tour. It took place in Banja Luka, Bosnia and Herzegovina between 14 and 20 September 2009.

== Singles main draw entrants ==
=== Seeds ===
Nationality	Player	Ranking*	Seeding
ESP	Daniel Gimeno-Traver	101	1
ESP	Iván Navarro	119	2
FRA	Laurent Recouderc	150	3
ESP	Pere Riba	157	4
FRA	Stéphane Robert	166	5
FRA	Julian Reister	167	6
MON	Jean-René Lisnard	204	7
SVK	Kamil Čapkovič	213	8

- Rankings are as of August 31, 2009.

=== Other entrants ===
The following players received wildcards into the singles main draw:

- (Bosnia and Herzegovina) Sven Lalić
- (Bosnia and Herzegovina) Aleksandar Marić
- (Bosnia and Herzegovina) Marko Stanić
- (Serbia) Arsenije Zlatanović

The following players received entry from the qualifying draw:

- (Hungary) Attila Balázs
- (Romania) Cătălin Gârd
- (Slovakia) Marek Semjan
- (Montenegro) Goran Tošić

== Champions ==
=== Singles ===
(Spain) Daniel Gimeno-Traver def. (Germany) Julian Reister, 6–4, 6–1

=== Doubles ===
(Jamaica) Dustin Brown / (Austria) Rainer Eitzinger def. (Bosnia and Herzegovina) Ismar Gorčić / (Italy) Simone Vagnozzi, 6–4, 6–3
