= 2018 Banja Luka Challenger =

- Date: 10–16 September
- Edition: 17th
- Surface: Clay
- Location: Banja Luka, Bosnia and Herzegovina

Champions

Singles
- (Italy) Alessandro Giannessi

Doubles
- (Slovakia) Andrej Martin / (Chile) Hans Podlipnik Castillo
← 2017 ·	Banja Luka Challenger	· 2019 →

The 2018 Banja Luka Challenger was a professional tennis tournament played on clay courts. It was the seventeenth edition of the tournament which was part of the 2018 ATP Challenger Tour. It took place in Banja Luka, Bosnia and Herzegovina from 10 to 16 September 2018.

== Singles main-draw entrants ==
=== Seeds ===
Country	Player	Rank^{1}	Seed
ARG	Juan Ignacio Londero	123	1
ESP	Pablo Andújar	126	2
ARG	Marco Trungelliti	142	3
ESP	Daniel Gimeno Traver	155	4
SVK	Andrej Martin	157	5
CHI	Christian Garín	158	6
ARG	Carlos Berlocq	172	7
ESP	Pedro Martínez	181	8

- ^{1} Rankings are as of 27 August 2018.

=== Other entrants ===
The following players received wildcards into the singles main draw:

- (Serbia) Marko Miladinović
- (Croatia) Franjo Raspudić
- (Japan) Kento Tagashira
- (Serbia) Miljan Zekić

The following player received entry into the singles main draw as a special exempt:

- (Brazil) Thomaz Bellucci

The following players received entry from the qualifying draw:

- (Argentina) Federico Coria
- (Russia) Aslan Karatsev
- (Bulgaria) Alexandar Lazov
- (Italy) Andrea Vavassori

== Champions ==
=== Singles ===
- (Italy) Alessandro Giannessi def. (Argentina) Carlos Berlocq 6–7^{(6–8)}, 6–4, 6–4.

=== Doubles ===
- (Slovakia) Andrej Martin / (Chile) Hans Podlipnik Castillo def. (Lithuania) Laurynas Grigelis / (Italy) Alessandro Motti 7–5, 4–6, [10–7].
