= 2015 Banja Luka Challenger =

- Date: 7–13 September
- Edition: 14th
- Surface: Clay
- Location: Banja Luka, Bosnia and Herzegovina

Champions

Singles
- (Serbia) Dušan Lajović

Doubles
- (Serbia) Ilija Bozoljac / (Italy) Flavio Cipolla
← 2014 ·	Banja Luka Challenger	· 2016 →

The 2015 Banja Luka Challenger was a professional tennis tournament played on clay courts. It was the fourteenth edition of the tournament which was part of the 2015 ATP Challenger Tour. It took place in Banja Luka, Bosnia and Herzegovina from 14 to 20 September 2015.

== Singles main-draw entrants ==
=== Seeds ===
Country	Player	Rank^{1}	Seed
ESP	Daniel Gimeno Traver	76	1
SRB	Dušan Lajović	109	3
ARG	Horacio Zeballos	148	4
GER	Tobias Kamke	172	5
SRB	Laslo Đere	180	6
FRA	Calvin Hemery	203	7
FRA	Mathias Bourgue	210	8

(Spain) Marcel Granollers, who was set as 2nd seed withdrew, due to right hip injury.

- ^{1} Rankings are as of September 7, 2015.

=== Other entrants ===
The following players received wildcards into the singles main draw:

- (Serbia) Ilija Bozoljac
- (Italy) Flavio Cipolla
- (Spain) Jaume Munar
- (Czech Republic) Jaroslav Pospíšil

The following players received entry from the qualifying draw:

- (Romania) Petru-Alexandru Luncanu
- (France) Sadio Doumbia
- (France) Axel Michon
- (Croatia) Antonio Šančić

The following players received entry as lucky losers:

- (Italy) Nicola Ghedin
- (France) Jérôme Inzerillo

== Champions ==
=== Singles ===
- (Serbia) Dušan Lajović def. (Romania) Victor Hănescu || 7-6^{(7–5)}, 7-6^{(7–5)}

=== Doubles ===
- (Serbia) Ilija Bozoljac / (Italy) Flavio Cipolla def. (Czech Republic) Jaroslav Pospíšil / (Czech Republic) Jan Šátral, 6–2, 7–5
