= 2016 Banja Luka Challenger =

- Date: 12–18 September
- Edition: 15th
- Surface: Clay
- Location: Banja Luka, Bosnia and Herzegovina

Champions

Singles
- (Czech Republic) Adam Pavlásek

Doubles
- (Czech Republic) Roman Jebavý / (Czech Republic) Jan Šátral
← 2015 ·	Banja Luka Challenger	· 2017 →

The 2016 Banja Luka Challenger was a professional tennis tournament played on clay courts. It was the fifteenth edition of the tournament which was part of the 2016 ATP Challenger Tour. It took place in Banja Luka, Bosnia and Herzegovina from 12 to 18 September 2016.

== Singles main-draw entrants ==
=== Seeds ===
Country	Player	Rank^{1}	Seed
ARG	Horacio Zeballos	71	1
ARG	Carlos Berlocq	76	2
GBR	Aljaž Bedene	77	3
CZE	Adam Pavlásek	112	4
ESP	Rubén Ramírez Hidalgo	148	5
HUN	Márton Fucsovics	155	6
SRB	Laslo Đere	184	7
SRB	Marko Tepavac	185	8

- ^{1} Rankings are as of August 29, 2016.

=== Other entrants ===
The following players received wildcards into the singles main draw:

- (Norway) Viktor Durasovic
- (Croatia) Antonio Šančić
- (Croatia) Nikola Mektić
- (Spain) Pablo Andújar

The following player received entry into the singles main draw with a protected ranking:

- (Serbia) Nikola Čačić

The following players received entry from the qualifying draw:

- (Austria) Maximilian Neuchrist
- (Croatia) Filip Veger
- (Austria) Sebastian Ofner
- (Austria) Lenny Hampel

== Champions ==
=== Singles ===
- (Czech Republic) Adam Pavlásek def. (Serbia) Miljan Zekić, 3–6, 6–1, 6–4.

=== Doubles ===
- (Czech Republic) Roman Jebavý / (Czech Republic) Jan Šátral def. (Italy) Andrea Arnaboldi / (Austria) Maximilian Neuchrist, 7–6^{(7–2)} 4–6, [10–7].
