= 2017 Banja Luka Challenger =

- Date: 11–17 September
- Edition: 16th
- Surface: Clay
- Location: Banja Luka, Bosnia and Herzegovina

Champions

Singles
- (Germany) Maximilian Marterer

Doubles
- (Croatia) Marin Draganja / (Croatia) Tomislav Draganja
← 2016 ·	Banja Luka Challenger	· 2018 →

The 2017 Banja Luka Challenger was a professional tennis tournament played on clay courts. It was the sixteenth edition of the tournament which was part of the 2017 ATP Challenger Tour. It took place in Banja Luka, Bosnia and Herzegovina from 11 to 17 September 2017.

== Singles main-draw entrants ==
=== Seeds ===
Country	Player	Rank^{1}	Seed
ESP	Roberto Carballés Baena	109	1
~~ESP~~	~~Guillermo García López~~	~~123~~	~~2~~
GER	Maximilian Marterer	125	3
SRB	Nikola Milojević	160	4
ESP	Ricardo Ojeda Lara	180	5
ITA	Lorenzo Giustino	188	6
ESP	Jaume Munar	208	7
CZE	Václav Šafránek	210	8

- ^{1} Rankings are as of 28 August 2017.

=== Other entrants ===
The following players received wildcards into the singles main draw:

- (Spain) Daniel Gimeno Traver
- (Croatia) Franjo Raspudić
- (Croatia) Nino Serdarušić
- (Japan) Kento Tagashira

The following player received entry into the singles main draw as a special exempt:

- (Germany) Kevin Krawietz

The following players received entry into the singles main draw as alternates:

- (Brazil) André Ghem
- (France) Alexandre Müller

The following players received entry from the qualifying draw:

- (Slovakia) Filip Horanský
- (Austria) Lucas Miedler
- (Hungary) Péter Nagy
- (Spain) Pol Toledo Bagué

The following players received entry as lucky losers:

- (Italy) Erik Crepaldi
- (Austria) Andreas Haider-Maurer

== Champions ==
=== Singles ===
- (Germany) Maximilian Marterer def. (Spain) Carlos Taberner 6–1, 6–2.

=== Doubles ===
- (Croatia) Marin Draganja / (Croatia) Tomislav Draganja def. (Serbia) Danilo Petrović / (Serbia) Ilija Vučić 6–4, 6–2.
