= 2011 Banja Luka Challenger =

- Date: 12–18 September
- Edition: 10th
- Location: Banja Luka, Bosnia and Herzegovina

Champions

Singles
- (Slovenia) Blaž Kavčič

Doubles
- (Italy) Marco Crugnola / (Spain) Rubén Ramírez Hidalgo
- Banja Luka Challenger

The 2011 Banja Luka Challenger was a professional tennis tournament played on clay courts. It was the tenth edition of the tournament which was part of the 2011 ATP Challenger Tour. It took place in Banja Luka, Bosnia and Herzegovina between 12 and 18 September 2011.

== ATP entrants ==
=== Seeds ===
Country	Player	Rank^{1}	Seed
ESP	Pere Riba	70	1
SVN	Blaž Kavčič	80	2
ESP	Daniel Gimeno Traver	89	3
ITA	Flavio Cipolla	108	4
SVN	Grega Žemlja	122	5
CZE	Jaroslav Pospíšil	126	6
ESP	Rubén Ramírez Hidalgo	134	7
ESP	Pablo Carreño Busta	167	8

- ^{1} Rankings are as of August 29, 2011.

=== Other entrants ===
The following players received wildcards into the singles main draw:

- (Bosnia and Herzegovina) Mirza Bašić
- (Serbia) Ivan Bjelica
- (Bosnia and Herzegovina) Tomislav Brkić
- (Montenegro) Goran Tošić

The following players received entry from the qualifying draw:

- (Croatia) Toni Androić
- (Serbia) Nikola Čačić
- (Croatia) Dino Marcan
- (Croatia) Ante Pavić

== Champions ==
=== Singles ===
(Slovenia) Blaž Kavčič def. (Spain) Pere Riba, 6–4, 6–1

=== Doubles ===
(Italy) Marco Crugnola / (Spain) Rubén Ramírez Hidalgo def. (Czech Republic) Jan Mertl / (Netherlands) Matwé Middelkoop, 7–6^{(7–3)}, 3–6, [10–8]
