= 2017 Banja Luka Challenger – Singles =

Singles
- 2017 Banja Luka Challenger

Final
- Champion: (Germany) Maximilian Marterer
- Runner-up: (Spain) Carlos Taberner
- Score: 6–1, 6–2

Events
Singles	Doubles
- Banja Luka Challenger

Adam Pavlásek was the defending champion but chose not to defend his title.

Maximilian Marterer won the title after defeating Carlos Taberner 6–1, 6–2 in the final.

== Seeds ==
1. (Spain) Roberto Carballés Baena (second round)
2. (Spain) Guillermo García López (withdrew)
3. (Germany) Maximilian Marterer (champion)
4. (Serbia) Nikola Milojević (quarterfinals)
5. (Spain) Ricardo Ojeda Lara (second round)
6. (Italy) Lorenzo Giustino (first round)
7. (Spain) Jaume Munar (second round, withdrew)
8. (Czech Republic) Václav Šafránek (first round)

== Draw ==
Key

- Q = Qualifier
- WC = Wild card
- LL = Lucky loser
- Alt = Alternate
- ITF = ITF entry
- PR = Protected ranking
- SR = Special ranking
- SE = Special exempt
- JE = Junior exempt
- JR = Junior Accelerator Programme entrant
- CO = College Accelerator Programme entrant
- NG = Next Gen Accelerator Program entrant
- w/o = Walkover
- r = Retired
- d = Defaulted

=== Finals ===
Semifinals
(Italy) Andrea Arnaboldi	6^{4}	0
3	(Germany) Maximilian Marterer	7^{7}	6
(Spain) Carlos Taberner	6	6
Q	(Spain) Pol Toledo Bagué	3	3

Final
3	(Germany) Maximilian Marterer	6	6
(Spain) Carlos Taberner	1	2

=== Top half ===
First round
1	(Spain) R Carballés Baena	7	6
LL	(Austria) A Haider-Maurer	5	3
(Italy) A Arnaboldi	5	6	6
(Serbia) P Krstin	7	1	3
(Slovenia) B Rola	3	1
(Canada) F Auger-Aliassime	6	6
WC	(Spain) D Gimeno Traver	6	7^{8}
8	(Czech Republic) V Šafránek	3	6^{6}
3	(Germany) M Marterer	6	6
(Belgium) K Coppejans	3	1
(Serbia) D Petrović	6	7
(Russia) I Gakhov	3	5
SE	(Germany) K Krawietz	2	0
(Czech Republic) Z Kolář	6	6
(Bosnia and Herzegovina) T Brkić	6	6
6	(Italy) L Giustino	4	4

Second round
1	(Spain) R Carballés Baena	2	3
(Italy) A Arnaboldi	6	6
(Canada) F Auger-Aliassime	7	6
WC	(Spain) D Gimeno Traver	5	3
3	(Germany) M Marterer	6	6
(Serbia) D Petrović	2	1
(Czech Republic) Z Kolář	6	7
(Bosnia and Herzegovina) T Brkić	3	5

Quarterfinals
(Italy) A Arnaboldi	6	6
(Canada) F Auger-Aliassime	3	4
3	(Germany) M Marterer	6	6
(Czech Republic) Z Kolář	2	4

Semifinals
(Italy) A Arnaboldi	6^{4}	0
3	(Germany) M Marterer	7^{7}	6

=== Bottom half ===
First round
5	(Spain) R Ojeda Lara	2	6	7
(Czech Republic) Petr Michnev	6	0	5
(Serbia) M Kecmanović	4	3
(Spain) C Taberner	6	6
Alt	(France) A Müller	6	6
WC	(Japan) Kento Tagashira	0	2
Alt	(Brazil) A Ghem	3	6	1
4	(Serbia) N Milojević	6	2	6
7	(Spain) J Munar	6	6
LL	(Italy) Erik Crepaldi	1	4
Q	(Slovakia) F Horanský	6	6
WC	(Croatia) Franjo Raspudić	2	3
Q	(Hungary) P Nagy	4	6	7^{8}
WC	(Croatia) N Serdarušić	6	4	6^{6}
Q	(Spain) P Toledo Bagué	5	7	6
Q	(Austria) L Miedler	7	5	4

Second round
5	(Spain) R Ojeda Lara	7^{7}	6^{1}	2
(Spain) C Taberner	6^{1}	7^{7}	6
Alt	(France) A Müller	6^{6}	0
4	(Serbia) N Milojević	7^{8}	6
7	(Spain) J Munar
Q	(Slovakia) F Horanský	w/o
Q	(Hungary) P Nagy	1	4
Q	(Spain) P Toledo Bagué	6	6

Quarterfinals
(Spain) C Taberner	7	3	6
4	(Serbia) N Milojević	5	6	2
Q	(Slovakia) F Horanský	6	5	3
Q	(Spain) P Toledo Bagué	4	7	6

Semifinals
(Spain) C Taberner	6	6
Q	(Spain) P Toledo Bagué	3	3
