= 2023 Banja Luka Challenger =

- Date: 7–13 August
- Edition: 21st
- Surface: Clay
- Location: Banja Luka, Bosnia and Herzegovina

Champions

Singles
- (Croatia) Dino Prižmić

Doubles
- (Romania) Victor Vlad Cornea / (Austria) Philipp Oswald
- Banja Luka Challenger

The 2023 Banja Luka Challenger was a professional tennis tournament played on clay courts. It was the 21st edition of the tournament which was part of the 2023 ATP Challenger Tour. It took place in Banja Luka, Bosnia and Herzegovina from 7 to 13 August 2023.

== Singles main-draw entrants ==
=== Seeds ===
Country	Player	Rank^{1}	Seed
HUN	Fábián Marozsán	89	1
ITA	Marco Cecchinato	108	2
SVK	Alex Molčan	120	3
FRA	Benoît Paire	126	4
BEL	Kimmer Coppejans	160	5
ARG	Mariano Navone	168	6
CZE	Zdeněk Kolář	171	7
BIH	Damir Džumhur	172	8

- ^{1} Rankings are as of 31 July 2023.

=== Other entrants ===
The following players received wildcards into the singles main draw:

- (Italy) Marco Cecchinato
- (Slovakia) Alex Molčan
- (Bosnia and Herzegovina) Andrej Nedić

The following players received entry into the singles main draw as special exempts:

- (France) Ugo Blanchet
- (United States) Toby Kodat

The following player received entry into the singles main draw as an alternate:

- (France) Kyrian Jacquet

The following players received entry from the qualifying draw:

- (Bosnia and Herzegovina) Mirza Bašić
- (Australia) Akira Santillan
- (Bosnia and Herzegovina) Aldin Šetkić
- (Germany) Marko Topo
- (Ukraine) Eric Vanshelboim
- (Serbia) Miljan Zekić

== Champions ==
=== Singles ===
- (Croatia) Dino Prižmić def. (Belgium) Kimmer Coppejans 6–2, 6–3.

=== Doubles ===
- (Romania) Victor Vlad Cornea / (Austria) Philipp Oswald def. (Kazakhstan) Andrey Golubev / (Ukraine) Denys Molchanov 3–6, 6–1, [15–13].
