= 2021 Banja Luka Challenger – Singles =

Singles
- 2021 Banja Luka Challenger

Final
- Champion: (Argentina) Juan Manuel Cerúndolo
- Runner-up: (Serbia) Nikola Milojević
- Score: 6–3, 6–1

Events
Singles	Doubles
- Banja Luka Challenger

Tallon Griekspoor was the defending champion but chose not to defend his title.

Juan Manuel Cerúndolo won the title after defeating Nikola Milojević 6–3, 6–1 in the final.

== Seeds ==
1. (Slovakia) Andrej Martin (semifinals)
2. (Argentina) Juan Manuel Cerúndolo (champion)
3. (Argentina) Tomás Martín Etcheverry (semifinals)
4. (Serbia) Nikola Milojević (final)
5. (India) Sumit Nagal (second round)
6. (Serbia) Danilo Petrović (first round)
7. (Czech Republic) Zdeněk Kolář (quarterfinals)
8. (Czech Republic) Vít Kopřiva (first round)

== Draw ==
Key

- Q = Qualifier
- WC = Wild card
- LL = Lucky loser
- Alt = Alternate
- ITF = ITF entry
- PR = Protected ranking
- SR = Special ranking
- SE = Special exempt
- JE = Junior exempt
- JR = Junior Accelerator Programme entrant
- CO = College Accelerator Programme entrant
- NG = Next Gen Accelerator Program entrant
- w/o = Walkover
- r = Retired
- d = Defaulted

=== Finals ===
Semifinals
1	(Slovakia) Andrej Martin	2	4
4	(Serbia) Nikola Milojević	6	6
3	(Argentina) Tomás Martín Etcheverry	3	3
2	(Argentina) Juan Manuel Cerúndolo	6	6

Final
4	(Serbia) Nikola Milojević	3	1
2	(Argentina) Juan Manuel Cerúndolo	6	6

=== Top half ===
First round
1	(Slovakia) A Martin	0
(France) M Guinard	0^{r}
Q	(Sweden) J Mridha	6	6
(Switzerland) D Stricker	2	3
WC	(Bosnia and Herzegovina) Dražen Petrović	1	0
(Spain) C Gómez-Herrera	6	6
(Peru) N Álvarez	1	2
5	(India) S Nagal	6	6
4	(Serbia) N Milojević	6	6
WC	(Bosnia and Herzegovina) Vladan Tadić	0	3
(Serbia) P Krstin	6	3	6
(United States) N Moreno de Alboran	2	6	2
(Bulgaria) D Kuzmanov	3	6	6
(Russia) A Shevchenko	6	4	1
(Serbia) M Zekić	3	1
7	(Czech Republic) Z Kolář	6	6

Second round
1	(Slovakia) A Martin	6	7
Q	(Sweden) J Mridha	3	5
(Spain) C Gómez-Herrera	7	6
5	(India) S Nagal	5	3
4	(Serbia) N Milojević	6	1
(Serbia) P Krstin	1	1^{r}
(Bulgaria) D Kuzmanov	5	2
7	(Czech Republic) Z Kolář	7	6

Quarterfinals
1	(Slovakia) A Martin	7^{7}	6
(Spain) C Gómez-Herrera	6^{2}	3
4	(Serbia) N Milojević	6	6
7	(Czech Republic) Z Kolář	3	0

Semifinals
1	(Slovakia) A Martin	2	4
4	(Serbia) N Milojević	6	6

=== Bottom half ===
First round
6	(Serbia) D Petrović	6	6^{4}	2
WC	(Serbia) M Topo	4	7^{7}	6
(Bosnia and Herzegovina) N Fatić	7	4	1
(Ukraine) V Sachko	5	6	6
Q	(Uruguay) M Cuevas	2	4
(Croatia) N Serdarušić	6	6
Q	(Czech Republic) D Poljak	2	5
3	(Argentina) TM Etcheverry	6	7
8	(Czech Republic) V Kopřiva	3	6	6^{5}
(Bosnia and Herzegovina) M Bašić	6	4	7^{7}
(Chinese Taipei) C-h Tseng	6	6
(Russia) A Vatutin	1	4
(Croatia) M Pecotić	4	6	7^{7}
Q	(Serbia) M Tepavac	6	3	6^{0}
(Tunisia) M Jaziri	6	3	4
2	(Argentina) JM Cerúndolo	1	6	6

Second round
WC	(Serbia) M Topo	6	3	7^{7}
(Ukraine) V Sachko	1	6	6^{5}
(Croatia) N Serdarušić	6	6^{4}	1
3	(Argentina) TM Etcheverry	4	7^{7}	6
(Bosnia and Herzegovina) M Bašić	2	4
(Chinese Taipei) C-h Tseng	6	6
(Croatia) M Pecotić
2	(Argentina) JM Cerúndolo	w/o

Quarterfinals
WC	(Serbia) M Topo	3	6^{6}
3	(Argentina) TM Etcheverry	6	7^{8}
(Chinese Taipei) C-h Tseng	2	0
2	(Argentina) JM Cerúndolo	6	6

Semifinals
3	(Argentina) TM Etcheverry	3	3
2	(Argentina) JM Cerúndolo	6	6
