= 2014 Banja Luka Challenger – Singles =

Singles
- 2014 Banja Luka Challenger

Final
- Champions: (Serbia) Viktor Troicki
- Runners-up: (Spain) Albert Ramos
- Score: 7–5, 4–6, 7–5

Events
Singles	Doubles
- Banja Luka Challenger

Aljaž Bedene was the defending champion, and returned to defend his title but lost to Viktor Troicki in the quarterfinals.

Viktor Troicki won the title by defeating Albert Ramos 7–5, 4–6, 7–5 in the final.

== Seeds ==
1. (Slovenia) Blaž Rola (semifinals)
2. (Spain) Albert Ramos (final)
3. (Austria) Andreas Haider-Maurer (semifinals)
4. (Slovenia) Aljaž Bedene (quarterfinals)
5. (Croatia) Ante Pavić (first round)
6. (United States) Chase Buchanan (first round)
7. (Czech Republic) Jaroslav Pospíšil (quarterfinals)
8. (Croatia) Nikola Mektić (first round)

== Draw ==
Key

- Q = Qualifier
- WC = Wild card
- LL = Lucky loser
- Alt = Alternate
- ITF = ITF entry
- PR = Protected ranking
- SR = Special ranking
- SE = Special exempt
- JE = Junior exempt
- JR = Junior Accelerator Programme entrant
- CO = College Accelerator Programme entrant
- NG = Next Gen Accelerator Program entrant
- w/o = Walkover
- r = Retired
- d = Defaulted

=== Finals ===
Semifinals
1	(Slovenia) Blaž Rola	2	4
(Serbia) Viktor Troicki	6	6
3	(Austria) Andreas Haider-Maurer	2	6^{3}
2	(Spain) Albert Ramos	6	7^{7}

Final
(Serbia) Viktor Troicki	7	4	7
2	(Spain) Albert Ramos	5	6	5

=== Top half ===
First round
1	(Slovenia) B Rola	6	2	6
(Brazil) T Monteiro	4	6	2
(Spain) R Ramírez Hidalgo	6	3	6
(Ukraine) A Smirnov	1	6	2
(Germany) R Becker	4	2
(Belgium) K Coppejans	6	6
WC	(Serbia) M Zekić	2	6	7^{7}
5	(Croatia) A Pavić	6	2	6^{4}
4	(Slovenia) A Bedene	6	3	6
(Russia) V Rudnev	4	6	2
(Germany) N Langer	6	6^{6}	6
Q	(Germany) Y Maden	4	7^{8}	4
WC	(Serbia) M Djokovic	6^{3}	1
(Belgium) A De Greef	7^{7}	6
(Serbia) V Troicki	6	7
8	(Croatia) N Mektić	4	5

Second round
1	(Slovenia) B Rola	7^{7}	6
(Spain) R Ramírez Hidalgo	6^{4}	3
(Belgium) K Coppejans	6	6
WC	(Serbia) M Zekić	2	4
4	(Slovenia) A Bedene	3	6	3
(Germany) N Langer	6	4	4
(Belgium) A De Greef	2	3
(Serbia) V Troicki	6	6

Quarterfinals
1	(Slovenia) B Rola	2	6	6
(Belgium) K Coppejans	6	4	3
4	(Slovenia) A Bedene	4	6^{5}
(Serbia) V Troicki	6	7^{7}

Semifinals
1	(Slovenia) B Rola	2	4
(Serbia) V Troicki	6	6

=== Bottom half ===
First round
7	(Czech Republic) J Pospíšil	6	7^{7}
WC	(Serbia) M Tepavac	2	6^{5}
(Austria) B Trinker	6^{5}	3
Q	(Slovakia) F Horanský	7^{7}	6
(Bosnia and Herzegovina) A Šetkić	2	4
(Serbia) B Pašanski	6	6
(France) T Lamasine	2	3
3	(Austria) A Haider-Maurer	6	6
6	(United States) C Buchanan	3	0
Q	(France) G Sakharov	6	6
Q	(Croatia) A Šančić	3	4
(Serbia) P Krstin	6	6
(Russia) A Karatsev	6	6
(Slovakia) Adrian Sikora	2	4
WC	(Serbia) N Milojević	2	4
2	(Spain) A Ramos	6	6

Second round
7	(Czech Republic) J Pospíšil	6	6
Q	(Slovakia) F Horanský	3	3
(Serbia) B Pašanski	5	3
3	(Austria) A Haider-Maurer	7	6
Q	(France) G Sakharov	7^{7}	6
(Serbia) P Krstin	6^{3}	2
(Russia) A Karatsev	4	1
2	(Spain) A Ramos	6	6

Quarterfinals
7	(Czech Republic) J Pospíšil	3	2
3	(Austria) A Haider-Maurer	6	6
Q	(France) G Sakharov	6^{3}	6	4
2	(Spain) A Ramos	7^{7}	0	6

Semifinals
3	(Austria) A Haider-Maurer	2	6^{3}
2	(Spain) A Ramos	6	7^{7}
