= 2021 Banja Luka Challenger =

- Date: 6–12 September
- Edition: 19th
- Surface: Clay
- Location: Banja Luka, Bosnia and Herzegovina

Champions

Singles
- (Argentina) Juan Manuel Cerúndolo

Doubles
- (Croatia) Antonio Šančić / (Croatia) Nino Serdarušić
- Banja Luka Challenger

The 2021 Banja Luka Challenger was a professional tennis tournament played on clay courts. It was the nineteenth edition of the tournament which was part of the 2021 ATP Challenger Tour. It took place in Banja Luka, Bosnia and Herzegovina from 6 to 12 September 2021.

== Singles main-draw entrants ==
=== Seeds ===
Country	Player	Rank^{1}	Seed
SVK	Andrej Martin	122	1
ARG	Juan Manuel Cerúndolo	135	2
ARG	Tomás Martín Etcheverry	142	3
SRB	Nikola Milojević	160	4
IND	Sumit Nagal	164	5
SRB	Danilo Petrović	177	6
CZE	Zdeněk Kolář	182	7
CZE	Vít Kopřiva	202	8

- ^{1} Rankings are as of 30 August 2021.

=== Other entrants ===
The following players received wildcards into the singles main draw:

- (Bosnia and Herzegovina) Dražen Petrović
- (Bosnia and Herzegovina) Vladan Tadić
- (Serbia) Marko Topo

The following players received entry from the qualifying draw:

- (Uruguay) Martín Cuevas
- (Sweden) Jonathan Mridha
- (Czech Republic) David Poljak
- (Serbia) Marko Tepavac

== Champions ==
=== Singles ===
- (Argentina) Juan Manuel Cerúndolo def. (Serbia) Nikola Milojević 6–3, 6–1.

=== Doubles ===
- (Croatia) Antonio Šančić / (Croatia) Nino Serdarušić def. (Croatia) Ivan Sabanov / (Croatia) Matej Sabanov 6–3, 6–3.
