= Dino Marcan =

Croatian tennis player

- Country (sports): Croatia
- Residence: Zagreb, Croatia
- Born: 12 February 1991 (age 35) Rijeka, Yugoslavia
- Height: 1.77 m (5 ft 9 1/2 in)
- Turned pro: 2008
- Retired: 2017
- Plays: Right-handed (Double-handed backhand)
- Prize money: US$ 174,123

Singles
- Career record: 0–2
- Career titles: 0
- Highest ranking: No. 289 (9 July 2012)

Doubles
- Career record: 3–13
- Career titles: 0
- Highest ranking: No. 87 (1 May 2017)

Grand Slam doubles results
- Wimbledon: 1R (2017)

Dino Marcan (born 12 February 1991 in Rijeka, Yugoslavia) is a Croatian former professional tennis player. Dino mostly competes on the ATP Challenger Tour.

== Career statistics ==
=== Singles titles (2) ===
Legend
Challengers (0)
Futures (2–6)

Outcome	No.	Date	Tournament	Surface	Opponent	Score
Runner-up	1.	26 October 2010	Dubrovnik, Croatia	Clay	(Croatia) Kristijan Mesaroš	2–6, 4–6
Winner	2.	4 July 2011	Yerevan, Armenia	Clay	(Croatia) Toni Androić	4–6, 6–2, 6–3
Winner	3.	9 August 2011	Subotica, Serbia	Clay	(France) Mathieu Rodrigues	6–1, 2–6, 6–3
Runner-up	4.	16 August 2011	Čakovec, Croatia	Clay	(Croatia) Toni Androić	4–6, 1–6
Runner-up	5.	23 August 2011	Vinkovci, Croatia	Clay	(Serbia) Nikola Čačić	6–7, 0–6
Runner-up	6.	20 March 2012	Poreč, Croatia	Clay	(Germany) Kevin Krawietz	3–6, 7–5, 3–6
Runner-up	7.	22 May 2012	Bucharest, Romania	Clay	(Germany) Kevin Krawietz	2–6, 5–7
Runner-up	8.	7 August 2012	Novi Sad, Serbia	Clay	(Serbia) Ivan Bjelica	6–2, 5–7, 2–6
