= Banja Luka Challenger =

- 2023 Banja Luka Challenger

Defunct tennis tournament
- Editions: 21
- Location: Banja Luka, Bosnia and Herzegovina
- Venue: Tenis Klub Mladost, National tennis complex
- Category: ATP Challenger Tour
- Surface: Clay / Outdoors
- Draw: 32S/32Q/16D
- Prize money: €118,000

The Banja Luka Challenger was a tennis tournament held in Banja Luka, Bosnia and Herzegovina since 2002. The event is part of the ATP Challenger Tour and is played on outdoor clay courts. The 2024 edition was cancelled on the 2024 Challenger Tour.

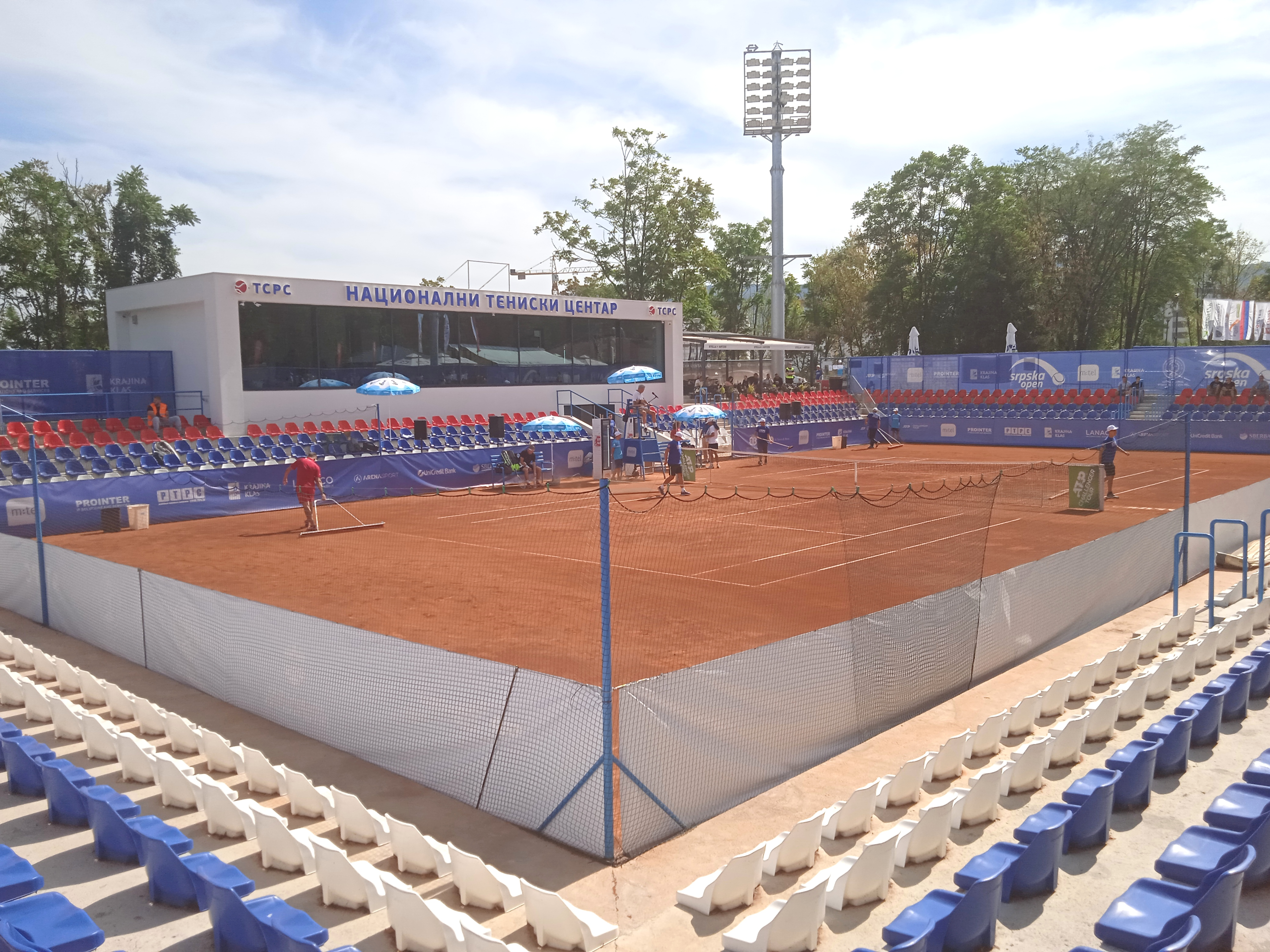
National Tennis Center of the Republic of Srpska, Banja Luka

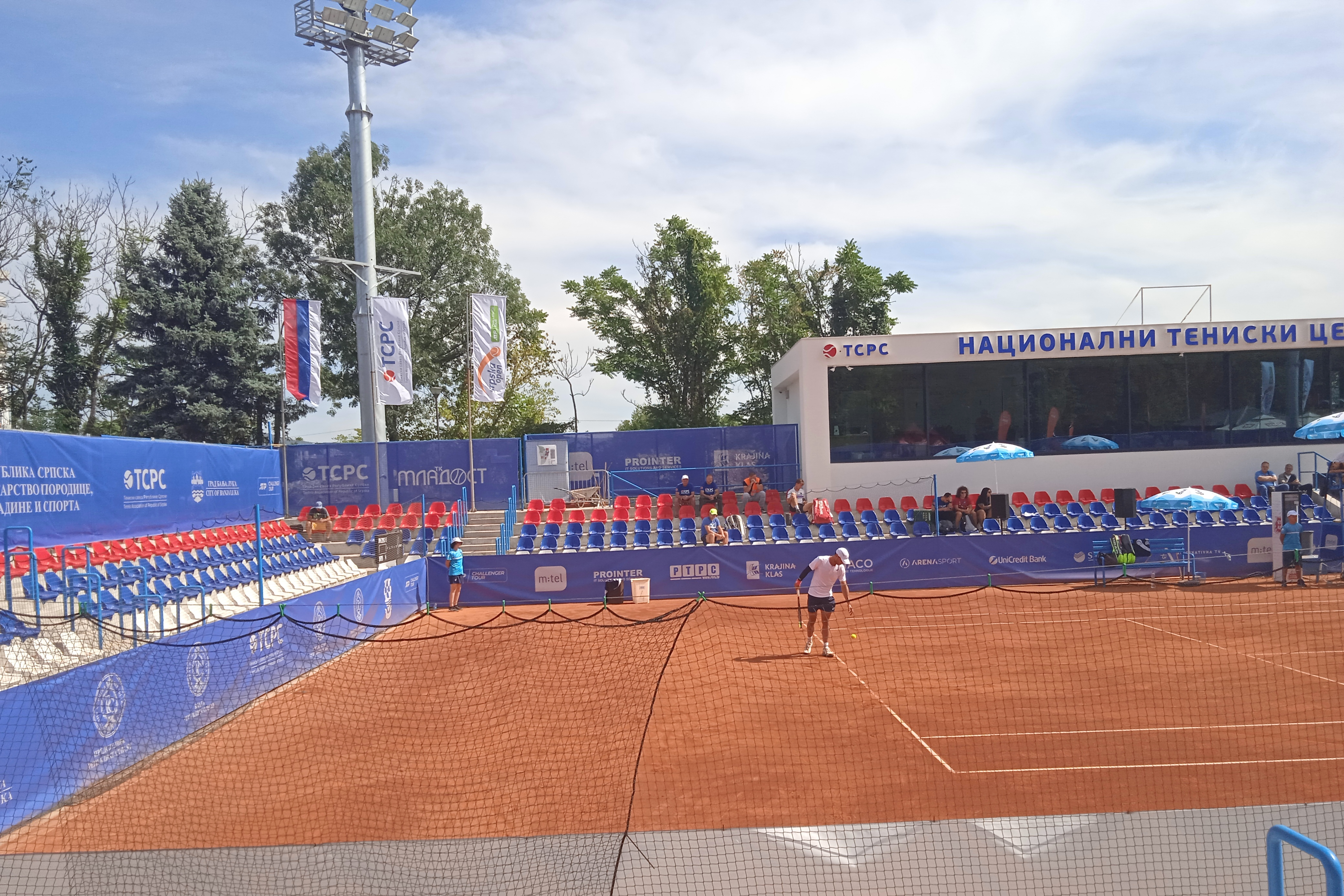
Tennis tournament at the National tennis center of Republic of Srpska

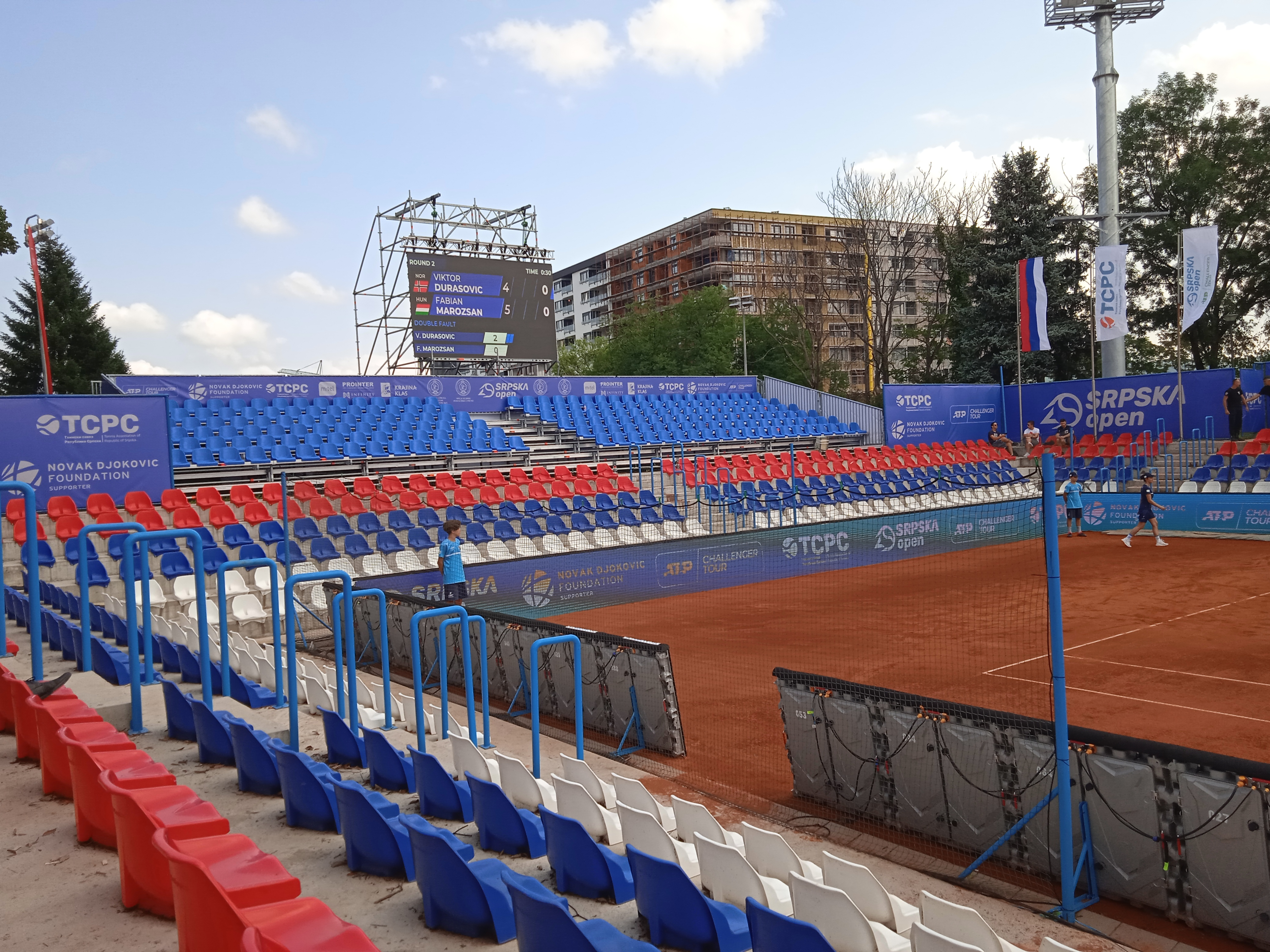
The National tennis center of Republic of Srpska

== Past finals ==
=== Singles ===
Year	Champion	Runner-up	Score
2023	(Croatia) Dino Prižmić	(Belgium) Kimmer Coppejans	6–2, 6–3
2022	(Hungary) Fábián Marozsán	(Bosnia and Herzegovina) Damir Džumhur	6–2, 6–1
2021	(Argentina) Juan Manuel Cerúndolo	(Serbia) Nikola Milojević	6–3, 6–1
2020	Not Held		
2019	(Netherlands) Tallon Griekspoor	(India) Sumit Nagal	6–2, 6–3
2018	(Italy) Alessandro Giannessi	(Argentina) Carlos Berlocq	6–7^{(6–8)}, 6–4, 6–4
2017	(Germany) Maximilian Marterer	(Spain) Carlos Taberner	6–1, 6–2
2016	(Czech Republic) Adam Pavlásek	(Serbia) Miljan Zekić	3–6, 6–1, 6–4
2015	(Serbia) Dušan Lajović	(Romania) Victor Hănescu	7–6^{(7–5)}, 7–6^{(7–5)}
2014	(Serbia) Viktor Troicki	(Spain) Albert Ramos	7–5, 4–6, 7–5
2013	(Slovenia) Aljaž Bedene	(Argentina) Diego Schwartzman	6–3, 6–4
2012	(Romania) Victor Hănescu	(Austria) Andreas Haider-Maurer	6–4, 6–1
2011	(Slovenia) Blaž Kavčič	(Spain) Pere Riba	6–4, 6–1
2010	(Turkey) Marsel İlhan	(Spain) Pere Riba	6–0, 7–6^{(7–4)}
2009	(Spain) Daniel Gimeno-Traver	(Germany) Julian Reister	6–4, 6–1
2008	(Serbia) Ilija Bozoljac	(Spain) Daniel Gimeno-Traver	6–4, 6–4
2007	(Greece) Konstantinos Economidis	(Spain) Iván Navarro	7–6, 6–4
2006	(Austria) Marco Mirnegg	(France) Nicolas Devilder	6–2, 6–4
2005	(Greece) Vasilis Mazarakis	(Serbia and Montenegro) Viktor Troicki	6–2, 6–2
2004	(Russia) Yuri Schukin	(Austria) Werner Eschauer	7–6, 7–6
2003	(Croatia) Mario Radić	(Czech Republic) František Čermák	6–4, 6–3
2002	(Germany) Tomas Behrend	(Austria) Werner Eschauer	no winner

=== Doubles ===
Year	Champion	Runner-up	Score
2023	(Romania) Victor Vlad Cornea (Austria) Philipp Oswald	(Kazakhstan) Andrey Golubev (Ukraine) Denys Molchanov	3–6, 6–1, [15–13]
2022	(Ukraine) Vladyslav Manafov (Ukraine) Oleg Prihodko	(Germany) Fabian Fallert (Germany) Hendrik Jebens	6–3, 6–4
2021	(Croatia) Antonio Šančić (Croatia) Nino Serdarušić	(Croatia) Ivan Sabanov (Croatia) Matej Sabanov	6–3, 6–3
2020	Not Held		
2019	(France) Sadio Doumbia (France) Fabien Reboul	(Peru) Sergio Galdós (Argentina) Facundo Mena	6–3, 7–6^{(7–4)}
2018	(Slovakia) Andrej Martin (Chile) Hans Podlipnik Castillo	(Lithuania) Laurynas Grigelis (Italy) Alessandro Motti	7–5, 4–6, [10–7]
2017	(Croatia) Marin Draganja (Croatia) Tomislav Draganja	(Serbia) Danilo Petrović (Serbia) Ilija Vučić	6–4, 6–2
2016	(Czech Republic) Roman Jebavý (Czech Republic) Jan Šátral	(Italy) Andrea Arnaboldi (Austria) Maximilian Neuchrist	7–6^{(7–3)}, 4–6 [10–7]
2015	(Serbia) Ilija Bozoljac (Italy) Flavio Cipolla	(Czech Republic) Jaroslav Pospíšil (Czech Republic) Jan Šátral	6–2, 7–5
2014	(Croatia) Dino Marcan (Croatia) Antonio Šančić	(Czech Republic) Jaroslav Pospíšil (Slovakia) Adrian Sikora	7–5, 6–4
2013	(Croatia) Marin Draganja (Croatia) Nikola Mektić	(Germany) Dominik Meffert (Ukraine) Oleksandr Nedovyesov	6–4, 3–6, [10–6]
2012	(Croatia) Marin Draganja (Croatia) Lovro Zovko	(Australia) Colin Ebelthite (Czech Republic) Jaroslav Pospíšil	6–1, 6–1
2011	(Italy) Marco Crugnola (Spain) Rubén Ramírez Hidalgo	(Czech Republic) Jan Mertl (Netherlands) Matwé Middelkoop	7–6^{(7–3)}, 3–6, [10–8]
2010	(United States) James Cerretani (Czech Republic) David Škoch	(Canada) Adil Shamasdin (Croatia) Lovro Zovko	6–1, 6–4
2009	(Jamaica) Dustin Brown (Austria) Rainer Eitzinger	(Bosnia and Herzegovina) Ismar Gorčić (Italy) Simone Vagnozzi	6–4, 6–3
2008	(Hungary) Attila Balázs (Israel) Amir Hadad	(Australia) Rameez Junaid (Germany) Philipp Marx	7–5, 6–2
2007	(Russia) Alexandre Krasnoroutskiy (Russia) Alexandre Kudryavtsev	(Argentina) Diego Junqueira (Serbia) Vladimir Obradović	6–2, 6–4
2006	(Australia) Joseph Sirianni (Belgium) Stefan Wauters	(Bosnia and Herzegovina) Ivan Dodig (Bosnia and Herzegovina) Aleksandar Marić	6–4, 3–6, [10–4]
2005	(Italy) Flavio Cipolla (Austria) Rainer Eitzinger	(Belgium) Jeroen Masson (Belgium) Stefan Wauters	4–6, 6–3, 6–3
2004	(Netherlands) Jasper Smit (Argentina) Martín Vassallo Argüello	no finalist	no winner
2003	(Romania) Ionut Moldovan (Russia) Yuri Schukin	(Federal Republic of Yugoslavia) Nikola Ćirić (Federal Republic of Yugoslavia) Goran Tošić	6–2, 7–5
2002	(Czech Republic) Jaroslav Levinský (Russia) Yuri Schukin	(Argentina) Juan Pablo Guzmán (Argentina) Daniel Orsanic	7–6, 7–5
