= 2011 Ropharma Brașov Challenger – Doubles =

Doubles
- 2011 Ropharma Brașov Challenger

Final
- Champions: (Romania) Victor Anagnastopol (Romania) Florin Mergea
- Runners-up: (Czech Republic) Dušan Lojda (France) Benoît Paire
- Score: 6–2, 6–3

Events
Singles	Doubles
← 2010 ·	Ropharma Brașov Challenger	· 2012 →

Flavio Cipolla and Daniele Giorgini were the defending champions, but decided not to participate.

Victor Anagnastopol and Florin Mergea won the title after defeating Dušan Lojda and Benoît Paire 6–2, 6–3 in the final.

== Seeds ==
1. (Austria) Gerald Melzer / (Russia) Mikhail Vasiliev (first round)
2. (Spain) Guillermo Alcaide / (Slovakia) Ivo Klec (withdrew)
3. (Moldova) Radu Albot / (Moldova) Andrei Ciumac (quarterfinals)
4. (Czech Republic) Michal Konečný / (Sweden) Michael Ryderstedt (semifinals)

== Draw ==
=== Key ===
- Q = Qualifier
- WC = Wild card
- LL = Lucky loser
- Alt = Alternate
- SE = Special exempt
- PR = Protected ranking
- ITF = ITF entry
- JE = Junior exempt
- w/o = Walkover
- r = Retired
- d = Defaulted
- SR = Special ranking

=== Draw ===
First round
1	(Austria) G Melzer (Russia) Mikhail Vasiliev	4	2
WC	(Romania) V Anagnastopol (Romania) F Mergea	6	6
(Germany) A Beck (Republic of Ireland) L Sorensen	6	7^{7}
(Romania) P-A Luncanu (Romania) R Sabău	2	6^{3}
3	(Moldova) R Albot (Moldova) A Ciumac	6	6
WC	(Romania) Alexandru-Daniel Carpen (Malaysia) MA Merzuki	3	2
WC	(Romania) Sebastian Kraila (Romania) G Moraru	2	3
(Romania) M Copil (Romania) Andrei Mlendea	6	6
Alt	(Romania) Robert Coman (Romania) Laurențiu-Ady Gavrilă	6	6
(Romania) C Gârd (Romania) A Ungur	4	2
(Greece) P Gemouchidis (France) M Teixeira	1	2
4	(Czech Republic) Michal Konečný (Sweden) M Ryderstedt	6	6
(Czech Republic) D Lojda (France) B Paire	6	6
(Germany) Richard Becker (Germany) Mark-Alexander Kepler	3	3
(Romania) T-D Crăciun (Romania) A Cruciat	4	1
Alt	(Czech Republic) J Hájek (Czech Republic) Jan Subota	6	6

Quarterfinals
WC	(Romania) V Anagnastopol (Romania) F Mergea	w/o
(Germany) A Beck (Republic of Ireland) L Sorensen
3	(Moldova) R Albot (Moldova) A Ciumac	3	5
(Romania) M Copil (Romania) A Mlendea	6	7
Alt	(Romania) R Coman (Romania) L-A Gavrilă	7^{7}	4	[5]
4	(Czech Republic) M Konečný (Sweden) M Ryderstedt	6^{4}	6	[10]
(Czech Republic) D Lojda (France) B Paire	6	6
Alt	(Czech Republic) J Hájek (Czech Republic) J Subota	2	1

Semifinals
WC	(Romania) V Anagnastopol (Romania) F Mergea	6	6
(Romania) M Copil (Romania) A Mlendea	4	4
4	(Czech Republic) M Konečný (Sweden) M Ryderstedt	3	6^{6}
(Czech Republic) D Lojda (France) B Paire	6	7^{8}

Final
WC	(Romania) V Anagnastopol (Romania) F Mergea	6	6
(Czech Republic) D Lojda (France) B Paire	2	3
