= 2010 Brașov Challenger – Singles =

Singles
- 2010 Brașov Challenger

Final
- Champion: (France) Éric Prodon
- Runner-up: (Czech Republic) Jaroslav Pospíšil
- Score: 7–6(1), 6–3

Events
Singles	Doubles
← 2009 ·	Brașov Challenger	· 2011 →

Thiemo de Bakker was the defending champion, but chose not to compete this year.
Éric Prodon won in the final 7–6(1), 6–3, against Jaroslav Pospíšil.

== Seeds ==
1. (Germany) Daniel Brands (first round)
2. (Romania) Adrian Ungur (quarterfinals)
3. (Czech Republic) Dušan Lojda (first round)
4. (Romania) Victor Crivoi (first round)
5. (Italy) Alessio di Mauro (semifinals)
6. (Italy) Flavio Cipolla (first round)
7. (France) Éric Prodon (champion)
8. (Austria) Andreas Haider-Maurer (quarterfinals)

== Draw ==
=== Key ===
- Q = Qualifier
- WC = Wild card
- LL = Lucky loser
- Alt = Alternate
- SE = Special exempt
- PR = Protected ranking
- ITF = ITF entry
- JE = Junior exempt
- w/o = Walkover
- r = Retired
- d = Defaulted
- SR = Special ranking

=== Finals ===
Semifinals
(Spain) Guillermo Alcaide	6^{5}	4
(Czech Republic) Jaroslav Pospíšil	7	6
7	(France) Éric Prodon	6	6
5	(Italy) Alessio di Mauro	2	2

Final
(Czech Republic) Jaroslav Pospíšil	6^{1}	3
7	(France) Éric Prodon	7	6

=== Top half ===
First round
1/WC	(Germany) D Brands	2	3
(Spain) G Alcaide	6	6
(France) F Reynet	3	4
(Slovakia) I Klec	6	6
(Estonia) J Zopp	7	7
(Austria) P Oswald	6^{8}	6^{4}
(Romania) A Mlendea	3	3
8	(Austria) A Haider-Maurer	6	6
4	(Romania) V Crivoi	3	4
(Czech Republic) J Pospíšil	6	6
Q	(Egypt) K Maamoun	2	6	2
(Italy) F Aldi	6	3	6
Q	(Romania) A Cruciat	6^{7}	5
(Montenegro) G Tošić	7	7
(Italy) M Trevisan	6	1	6
6	(Italy) F Cipolla	3	6	3

Second round
(Spain) G Alcaide	7	7
(Slovakia) I Klec	6^{4}	6^{1}
(Estonia) J Zopp	3	2
8	(Austria) A Haider-Maurer	6	6
(Czech Republic) J Pospíšil	6	6
(Italy) F Aldi	2	1
(Montenegro) G Tošić	1	0
(Italy) M Trevisan	6	6

Quarterfinals
(Spain) G Alcaide	7	7
8	(Austria) A Haider-Maurer	6^{4}	5
(Czech Republic) J Pospíšil	6	1	6
(Italy) M Trevisan	4	6	3

Semifinals
(Spain) G Alcaide	6^{5}	4
(Czech Republic) J Pospíšil	7	6

=== Bottom half ===
First round
7	(France) É Prodon	6	3	6
Q	(Romania) L-A Gavrilă	1	6	2
WC	(Romania) V Anagnastopol	6	6^{6}	2
(Romania) M Copil	2	7	6
ALT	(Romania) P-A Luncanu	6^{4}	6	4
(Slovakia) P Červenák	7	2	6
(Italy) D Giorgini	6^{7}	6	7
3	(Czech Republic) D Lojda	7	4	5
5	(Italy) A di Mauro	6	6
Q	(Hungary) K Bardóczky	4	2
WC	(Romania) R Sabău	6	6
WC	(Romania) S Pădure	2	2
LL	(Moldova) R Albot	6	2	1
(Romania) C Gârd	4	6	6
PR	(Germany) A Satschko	6	2	2
2	(Romania) A Ungur	4	6	6

Second round
7	(France) É Prodon	6	6
(Romania) M Copil	4	4
(Slovakia) P Červenák	6^{5}	7	4
(Italy) D Giorgini	7	5	6
5	(Italy) A di Mauro	1	6	6
WC	(Romania) R Sabău	6	3	3
(Romania) C Gârd	1	5
2	(Romania) A Ungur	6	7

Quarterfinals
7	(France) É Prodon	6	6
(Italy) D Giorgini	2	3
5	(Italy) A di Mauro	6	6
2	(Romania) A Ungur	3	3

Semifinals
7	(France) É Prodon	6	6
5	(Italy) A di Mauro	2	2
