= 2011 Ropharma Brașov Challenger – Singles =

Singles
- 2011 Ropharma Brașov Challenger

Final
- Champion: (France) Benoît Paire
- Runner-up: (France) Maxime Teixeira
- Score: 6–4, 3–0, retired

Events
Singles	Doubles
← 2010 ·	Ropharma Brașov Challenger	· 2012 →

Éric Prodon chose to not defend his last year's title.

Benoît Paire won the title after defeating Maxime Teixeira in the final, when he was leading 6–4, 3–0 and Maxime retired.

== Seeds ==
1. (Austria) Andreas Haider-Maurer (second round, retired due to cramping)
2. (Slovenia) Blaž Kavčič (first round)
3. (France) Benoît Paire (champion)
4. (Romania) Adrian Ungur (semifinals)
5. (Germany) Andreas Beck (quarterfinals)
6. (Czech Republic) Jan Hájek (semifinals)
7. (France) Maxime Teixeira (final, retired)
8. (Croatia) Antonio Veić (quarterfinals)

== Draw ==
=== Key ===
- Q = Qualifier
- WC = Wild card
- LL = Lucky loser
- Alt = Alternate
- SE = Special exempt
- PR = Protected ranking
- ITF = ITF entry
- JE = Junior exempt
- w/o = Walkover
- r = Retired
- d = Defaulted
- SR = Special ranking

=== Finals ===
Semifinals
6	(Czech Republic) Jan Hájek	2	2
3	(France) Benoît Paire	6	6
4	(Romania) Adrian Ungur	6^{8}	2
7	(France) Maxime Teixeira	7^{10}	6

Final
3	(France) Benoît Paire	6	3
7	(France) Maxime Teixeira	4	0^{r}

=== Top half ===
First round
1	(Austria) A Haider-Maurer	6	6
Q	(United Kingdom) Morgan Phillips	3	4
(Romania) V Crivoi	6	6
Q	(Romania) C Gârd	0	4
Q	(Czech Republic) Michal Konečný	7	6^{2}	6
WC	(Romania) G Moraru	5	7^{7}	1
WC	(Romania) R Sabău	4	7^{7}	6^{4}
6	(Czech Republic) J Hájek	6	6^{5}	7^{7}
3	(France) B Paire	6	6
(Hungary) Á Kellner	1	2
WC	(Moldova) A Ciumac	6	6
(Argentina) M Alund	0	3
(Ukraine) A Smirnov	6	3	2
(Serbia) M Zekić	3	6	6
(Spain) G Alcaide	7	5	3
5	(Germany) A Beck	5	7	6

Second round
1	(Austria) A Haider-Maurer	7^{7}	4	0^{r}
(Romania) V Crivoi	6^{4}	6	3
Q	(Czech Republic) M Konečný	2	7^{10}	3
6	(Czech Republic) J Hájek	6	6^{8}	6
3	(France) B Paire	6^{5}	7	6
WC	(Moldova) A Ciumac	7^{7}	5	2
(Serbia) M Zekić	3	3
5	(Germany) A Beck	6	6

Quarterfinals
(Romania) V Crivoi	3	1
6	(Czech Republic) J Hájek	6	6
3	(France) B Paire	3	6	6
5	(Germany) A Beck	6	1	3

Semifinals
6	(Czech Republic) J Hájek	2	2
3	(France) B Paire	6	6

=== Bottom half ===
First round
8	(Croatia) A Veić	6	6
(Slovakia) I Klec	4	2
(Croatia) N Mektić	3	2
(Moldova) R Albot	6	6
(Poland) M Gawron	0	1
(Austria) G Melzer	6	6
WC	(Romania) V Anagnastopol	2	1
4	(Romania) A Ungur	6	6
7	(France) M Teixeira	6	6
(Russia) Mikhail Vasiliev	1	2
Q	(Romania) Andrei Mlendea	0	2
(Sweden) M Ryderstedt	6	6
(Romania) M Copil	3	6	7
PR	(Republic of Ireland) L Sorensen	6	3	5
(Czech Republic) D Lojda	7	6
2	(Slovenia) B Kavčič	5	4

Second round
8	(Croatia) A Veić	7^{8}	3	6
(Moldova) R Albot	6^{6}	6	2
(Austria) G Melzer	6^{8}	5
4	(Romania) A Ungur	7^{10}	7
7	(France) M Teixeira	6	6
(Sweden) M Ryderstedt	4	4
(Romania) M Copil	4	4
(Czech Republic) D Lojda	6	6

Quarterfinals
8	(Croatia) A Veić	4	6^{3}
4	(Romania) A Ungur	6	7^{7}
7	(France) M Teixeira	7^{8}	6
(Czech Republic) D Lojda	6^{6}	4

Semifinals
4	(Romania) A Ungur	6^{8}	2
7	(France) M Teixeira	7^{10}	6
