= 2010 Brașov Challenger – Doubles =

Doubles
- 2010 Brașov Challenger

Final
- Champion: (Italy) Flavio Cipolla (Italy) Daniele Giorgini
- Runner-up: (Moldova) Radu Albot (Moldova) Andrei Ciumac
- Score: 6–3, 6–4

Events
Singles	Doubles
← 2009 ·	Brașov Challenger	· 2011 →

Pere Riba and Pablo Santos chose to try to not defend their 2009 title.
Flavio Cipolla and Daniele Giorgini won the final against Radu Albot and Andrei Ciumac 6–3, 6–4.

== Seeds ==
1. (Germany) Alex Satschko / (Montenegro) Goran Tošić (quarterfinals)
2. (Austria) Andreas Haider-Maurer / (Austria) Philipp Oswald (semifinals)
3. (Italy) Flavio Cipolla / (Italy) Daniele Giorgini (champions)
4. (Italy) Francesco Aldi / (Italy) Alessio di Mauro (quarterfinals)

== Draw ==
=== Key ===
- Q = Qualifier
- WC = Wild card
- LL = Lucky loser
- Alt = Alternate
- SE = Special exempt
- PR = Protected ranking
- ITF = ITF entry
- JE = Junior exempt
- w/o = Walkover
- r = Retired
- d = Defaulted
- SR = Special ranking

=== Draw ===
First round
1	(Germany) A Satschko (Montenegro) G Tošić	3	7	[12]
(Romania) M Copil (Slovakia) I Klec	6	5	[10]
(Romania) A Mlendea (Italy) M Trevisan	7	7
(Romania) V Anagnastopol (Romania) P-A Luncanu	6^{1}	5
4	(Italy) F Aldi (Italy) A di Mauro	6	6
(Slovakia) P Červenák (Czech Republic) J Pospíšil	3	4
(Republic of Ireland) J Cluskey (Republic of Ireland) C O'Brien	5	4
WC	(Moldova) R Albot (Moldova) A Ciumac	7	6
WC	(Romania) S Pădure (Romania) A Pipoş	2	1
(Romania) A Carpen (Romania) C Gârd	6	6
WC	(Romania) R Coman (Romania) L-A Gavrilă	4	1
3	(Italy) F Cipolla (Italy) D Giorgini	6	6
(Egypt) K Maamoun (Romania) R Sabău	2	2
(Hungary) K Bardóczky (Estonia) J Zopp	6	6
(Romania) A Cruciat (Romania) A Ungur	1	5
2	(Austria) A Haider-Maurer (Austria) P Oswald	6	7

Quarterfinals
1	(Germany) A Satschko (Montenegro) G Tošić	3	6^{5}
(Romania) A Mlendea (Italy) M Trevisan	6	7
4	(Italy) F Aldi (Italy) A di Mauro	2	1
WC	(Moldova) R Albot (Moldova) A Ciumac	6	6
(Romania) A Carpen (Romania) C Gârd	4	0	r
3	(Italy) F Cipolla (Italy) D Giorgini	6	2
(Hungary) K Bardóczky (Estonia) J Zopp	2	2
2	(Austria) A Haider-Maurer (Austria) P Oswald	6	6

Semifinals
(Romania) A Mlendea (Italy) M Trevisan	0	7	[3]
WC	(Moldova) R Albot (Moldova) A Ciumac	6	6^{4}	[10]
3	(Italy) F Cipolla (Italy) D Giorgini	6	6
2	(Austria) A Haider-Maurer (Austria) P Oswald	4	4

Finals
WC	(Moldova) R Albot (Moldova) A Ciumac	3	4
3	(Italy) F Cipolla (Italy) D Giorgini	6	6
