= 2012 BRD Brașov Challenger – Doubles =

Doubles
- 2012 BRD Brașov Challenger

Final
- Champions: (Romania) Marius Copil (Romania) Victor Crivoi
- Runners-up: (Moldova) Andrei Ciumac (Ukraine) Oleksandr Nedovyesov
- Score: 6–7^{(8–10)}, 6–4, [12–10]

Events
Singles	Doubles
← 2011 ·	BRD Brașov Challenger	· 2013 →

Victor Anagnastopol and Florin Mergea were the defending champions but Anagnastopol decided not to participate.
Mergea played alongside Philipp Marx.
Marius Copil and Victor Crivoi won the final 6–7^{(8–10)}, 6–4, [12–10] against Andrei Ciumac and Oleksandr Nedovyesov.

== Seeds ==
1. (Germany) Philipp Marx / (Romania) Florin Mergea (quarterfinals)
2. (Romania) Andrei Dăescu / (Australia) Adam Hubble (semifinals)
3. (Montenegro) Goran Tošić / (United States) Denis Zivkovic (semifinals)
4. (Croatia) Nikola Mektić / (Croatia) Antonio Veić (first round)

== Draw ==
=== Key ===
- Q = Qualifier
- WC = Wild card
- LL = Lucky loser
- Alt = Alternate
- SE = Special exempt
- PR = Protected ranking
- ITF = ITF entry
- JE = Junior exempt
- w/o = Walkover
- r = Retired
- d = Defaulted
- SR = Special ranking

=== Draw ===
First round
1	(Germany) P Marx (Romania) F Mergea	7^{7}	7
(Czech Republic) D Lojda (Poland) M Przysiężny	6^{1}	5
(Czech Republic) Michal Konečný (Croatia) D Marcan	2	3
(Romania) M Copil (Romania) V Crivoi	6	6
3	(Montenegro) G Tošić (United States) D Zivkovic	6	7
WC	(Romania) VV Cornea (Romania) C-I Gârd	2	5
(Bosnia and Herzegovina) D Džumhur (Spain) J Martí	6^{4}	2
(Slovakia) A Martin (Chile) H Podlipnik	7^{7}	6
(Moldova) R Borvanov (France) D Guez	2	5
WC	(Moldova) A Ciumac (Ukraine) O Nedovyesov	6	7
(Chile) J Aguilar (Serbia) B Pašanski	6	6
4	(Croatia) N Mektić (Croatia) A Veić	4	3
(Canada) S Diez (Spain) J Samper-Montaña	5	3
WC	(Romania) Sebastian Kraila (Romania) G Moraru	7	6
(Spain) A Brugués-Davi (Spain) G Granollers	6^{6}	3
2	(Romania) A Dăescu (Australia) A Hubble	7^{8}	6

Quarterfinals
1	(Germany) P Marx (Romania) F Mergea	7^{7}	5	[8]
(Romania) M Copil (Romania) V Crivoi	6^{4}	7	[10]
3	(Montenegro) G Tošić (United States) D Zivkovic	6	6
(Slovakia) A Martin (Chile) H Podlipnik	4	4
WC	(Moldova) A Ciumac (Ukraine) O Nedovyesov	2	7	[10]
(Chile) J Aguilar (Serbia) B Pašanski	6	5	[7]
WC	(Romania) Sebastian Kraila (Romania) G Moraru	3	3
2	(Romania) A Dăescu (Australia) A Hubble	6	6

Semifinals
(Romania) M Copil (Romania) V Crivoi	7	6
3	(Montenegro) G Tošić (United States) D Zivkovic	5	0
WC	(Moldova) A Ciumac (Ukraine) O Nedovyesov	6	1	[13]
2	(Romania) A Dăescu (Australia) A Hubble	4	6	[11]

Final
(Romania) M Copil (Romania) V Crivoi	6^{8}	6	[12]
WC	(Moldova) A Ciumac (Ukraine) O Nedovyesov	7^{10}	4	[10]
