= 2009 Brașov Challenger – Doubles =

Doubles
- 2009 Brașov Challenger

Final
- Champion: (Spain) Pere Riba; (Spain) Pablo Santos
- Runner-up: (Italy) Simone Vagnozzi; (Italy) Uros Vico
- Score: 6–3, 6–2

Events
Singles	Doubles
← 2008 ·	Brașov Challenger	· 2010 →

David Marrero and Daniel Muñoz de la Nava were the defending champions, but they chose not to participate that year.
Pere Riba and Pablo Santos won the final against Simone Vagnozzi and Uros Vico 6–3, 6–2.

== Seeds ==
1. (Spain) Pere Riba / (Spain) Pablo Santos (champions)
2. (Italy) Simone Vagnozzi / (Italy) Uros Vico (final)
3. (Romania) Cătălin Gârd / (Latvia) Deniss Pavlovs (quarterfinals)
4. (Egypt) Karim Maamoun / (Ukraine) Artem Smirnov (quarterfinals)

== Draw ==
=== Key ===
- Q = Qualifier
- WC = Wild card
- LL = Lucky loser
- Alt = Alternate
- ITF = ITF entry
- PR = Protected ranking
- SR = Special ranking
- SE = Special exempt
- JE = Junior exempt
- JR = Junior Accelerator Programme entrant
- CO = College Accelerator Programme entrant
- NG = Next Gen Accelerator Program entrant
- w/o = Walkover
- r = Retired
- d = Defaulted

=== Draw ===
First round

Quarterfinals

Semifinals

Finals

1
- (Spain) P Riba
- (Spain) P Santos
6
6

WC
(Romania) A-M Constantin
(Romania) A-G Onciu

(Romania) A-M Constantin
(Romania) A-G Onciu
0
1

- (Slovakia) K Čapkovič
- (Slovakia) P Červenák
w/o

1
- (Spain) P Riba
- (Spain) P Santos
6
7

4
- (Egypt) K Maamoun
- (Ukraine) A Smirnov
6
6

- (Romania) A Cruciat
- (Romania) G Moraru
4
6^{4}

(Romania) I-A Giurgiu
(Romania) C-A Porumb
2
2

4
- (Egypt) K Maamoun
- (Ukraine) A Smirnov
2
5

- (Italy) F Aldi
- (Romania) A Ungur
5
4

- (Romania) A Cruciat
- (Romania) G Moraru
6
7

- (Romania) A Cruciat
- (Romania) G Moraru
7
6

1
- (Spain) P Riba
- (Spain) P Santos
6
6

- (Romania) A Carpen
- (Spain) MÁ López Jaén
6
2
[10]

2
- (Italy) S Vagnozzi
- (Italy) U Vico
3
2

- (Romania) V Ioniță
- (Romania) R Sabău
2
6
[3]

- (Romania) A Carpen
- (Spain) MÁ López Jaén
5
7
[10]

- (Spain) I Cervantes Huegun
3
1

3
- (Romania) C Gârd
- (Latvia) D Pavlovs
7
5
[8]

3
- (Romania) C Gârd
- (Latvia) D Pavlovs
6
6

- (Romania) A Carpen
3
2

- (Romania) M Copil
- (Romania) P-A Luncanu
4
4

2
- (Italy) S Vagnozzi
- (Italy) U Vico
6
6

- (Poland) M Gawron
- (Poland) G Panfil
6
6

- (Poland) M Gawron
- (Poland) G Panfil
6^{6}
3

WC
(Romania) R Farcaş
(Romania) A Mlendea
1
3

2
- (Italy) S Vagnozzi
- (Italy) U Vico
7
6

2
- (Italy) S Vagnozzi
- (Italy) U Vico
6
6
