= 2009 Brașov Challenger – Singles =

Singles
- 2009 Brașov Challenger

Final
- Champion: (Netherlands) Thiemo de Bakker
- Runner-up: (Spain) Pere Riba
- Score: 7–5, 6–0

Events
Singles	Doubles
- Brașov Challenger

Daniel Gimeno Traver was the defending champion, but chose not to participate that year.
Thiemo de Bakker won in the final 7–5, 6–0, against Pere Riba.

== Seeds ==
1. (Netherlands) Thiemo de Bakker (champion)
2. (Spain) Pere Riba (final)
3. (Slovakia) Kamil Čapkovič (first round)
4. (Spain) Carles Poch Gradin (first round)
5. (Spain) Íñigo Cervantes-Huegun (first round)
6. (Spain) Pablo Santos (Quarterfinal)
7. (Spain) Miguel Ángel López Jaén (first round)
8. (Netherlands) Raemon Sluiter (second round)

== Draw ==
Key

- Q = Qualifier
- WC = Wild card
- LL = Lucky loser
- Alt = Alternate
- ITF = ITF entry
- PR = Protected ranking
- SR = Special ranking
- SE = Special exempt
- JE = Junior exempt
- JR = Junior Accelerator Programme entrant
- CO = College Accelerator Programme entrant
- NG = Next Gen Accelerator Program entrant
- w/o = Walkover
- r = Retired
- d = Defaulted

=== Final four ===
Semifinals
1	(Netherlands) Thiemo de Bakker	6	6
(Italy) Francesco Aldi	2	0
Q	(Romania) Adrian Ungur	3	4
2	(Spain) Pere Riba	6	6

Final
1	(Netherlands) Thiemo de Bakker	7	6
2	(Spain) Pere Riba	5	0

=== Top half ===
First round
1	(Netherlands) T de Bakker	6	6
(Romania) A Cruciat	0	3
(Poland) G Panfil	3	1
(Netherlands) M Middelkoop	6	6
(Slovakia) P Červenák	3	7	4
(Romania) P-A Luncanu	6	5	6
(Spain) S Gutiérrez-Ferrol	6	6
7	(Spain) MA López Jaén	3	4
3	(Slovakia) K Čapkovič	3	6	3^{r}
(Germany) A Flock	6	4	5
(Italy) F Aldi	4	6	6
(Latvia) D Pavlovs	6	0	2
(Romania) G Moraru	7	6
Q	(Egypt) K Maamoun	6^{2}	2
(Ukraine) A Smirnov	2	6	6
5	(Spain) I Cervantes-Huegun	6	4	0

Second round
1	(Netherlands) T de Bakker	6	5	7
(Netherlands) M Middelkoop	4	7	5
(Romania) P-A Luncanu	6	4	2
(Spain) S Gutiérrez-Ferrol	2	6	6
(Germany) A Flock	2	6	4
(Italy) F Aldi	6	1	6
(Romania) G Moraru	2	4
(Ukraine) A Smirnov	6	6

Quarterfinals
1	(Netherlands) T de Bakker	6	6
(Spain) S Gutiérrez-Ferrol	4	4
(Italy) F Aldi	6^{4}	6	6
(Ukraine) A Smirnov	7	2	3

Semifinals
1	(Netherlands) T de Bakker	6	6
(Italy) F Aldi	2	0

=== Bottom half ===
First round
8	(Netherlands) R Sluiter	6	6
Q	(Romania) I-A Giurgiu	0	0
(Czech Republic) D Lojda	6	6
WC	(Romania) R Sabău	3	4
WC	(Romania) C Gârd	6	6
(Romania) V Ioniță	2	4
Q	(Romania) A Ungur	6	6
4	(Spain) C Poch Gradin	4	4
6	(Spain) P Santos	6	6
WC	(Romania) M Copil	3	1
(Poland) M Gawron	2	6	7
Q	(Romania) A Carpen	6	0	6^{7}
(Russia) V Rudnev	6	7
WC	(Romania) A Mlendea	1	5
(Italy) S Vagnozzi	1	6^{2}
2	(Spain) P Riba	6	7

Second round
8	(Netherlands) R Sluiter	6	2	3
(Czech Republic) D Lojda	4	6	6
WC	(Romania) C Gârd	4	3
Q	(Romania) A Ungur	6	6
6	(Spain) P Santos	6	6
(Poland) M Gawron	1	2
(Russia) V Rudnev	1	2
2	(Spain) P Riba	6	6

Quarterfinals
(Czech Republic) D Lojda	3	3
Q	(Romania) A Ungur	6	6
6	(Spain) P Santos	6^{6}	3
2	(Spain) P Riba	7	6

Semifinals
Q	(Romania) A Ungur	3	4
2	(Spain) P Riba	6	6
