= 2012 BRD Brașov Challenger – Singles =

Singles
- 2012 BRD Brașov Challenger

Final
- Champion: (Austria) Andreas Haider-Maurer
- Runner-up: (Romania) Adrian Ungur
- Score: 3–6, 7–5, 6–2

Events
Singles	Doubles
- BRD Brașov Challenger

Benoît Paire chose to not defend his last year's title.

Andreas Haider-Maurer won the title after defeating Adrian Ungur 3–6, 7–5, 6–2 in the final.

== Seeds ==
1. (Romania) Victor Hănescu (quarterfinals)
2. (Romania) Adrian Ungur (final)
3. (Croatia) Antonio Veić (semifinals)
4. (Austria) Andreas Haider-Maurer (champion)
5. (Spain) Javier Martí (second round)
6. (Spain) Arnau Brugués-Davi (first round)
7. (Bosnia and Herzegovina) Damir Džumhur (second round)
8. (Romania) Marius Copil (second round)

== Draw ==
Key

- Q = Qualifier
- WC = Wild card
- LL = Lucky loser
- Alt = Alternate
- ITF = ITF entry
- PR = Protected ranking
- SR = Special ranking
- SE = Special exempt
- JE = Junior exempt
- JR = Junior Accelerator Programme entrant
- CO = College Accelerator Programme entrant
- NG = Next Gen Accelerator Program entrant
- w/o = Walkover
- r = Retired
- d = Defaulted

=== Finals ===
Semifinals
(Serbia) Boris Pašanski	3	6	1
4	(Austria) Andreas Haider-Maurer	6	3	6
3	(Croatia) Antonio Veić	1	6^{6}
2	(Romania) Adrian Ungur	6	7^{8}

Final
4	(Austria) Andreas Haider-Maurer	3	7	6
2	(Romania) Adrian Ungur	6	5	2

=== Top half ===
First round
1	(Romania) V Hănescu	4	7^{8}	6
(Czech Republic) D Lojda	6	6^{6}	0
(Croatia) N Mektić	6^{1}	6	6^{9}
(Spain) G Granollers	7^{7}	1	7^{11}
(Spain) J Samper-Montaña	4	2
(Serbia) B Pašanski	6	6
WC	(Romania) P-A Luncanu	6	2	3
5	(Spain) J Martí	3	6	6
4	(Austria) A Haider-Maurer	7	6
(Ukraine) O Nedovyesov	5	4
(Italy) L Vanni	6	6
(Moldova) A Ciumac	2	3
(Czech Republic) Michal Konečný	6	1	5
Q	(Montenegro) G Tošić	3	6	7
(Poland) M Przysiężny	4	7	6
6	(Spain) A Brugués-Davi	6	5	3

Second round
1	(Romania) V Hănescu	6	6
(Spain) G Granollers	1	3
(Serbia) B Pašanski	6	6
5	(Spain) J Martí	3	2
4	(Austria) A Haider-Maurer	6	6
(Italy) L Vanni	3	2
Q	(Montenegro) G Tošić	6^{5}	6	6
(Poland) M Przysiężny	7^{7}	1	4

Quarterfinals
1	(Romania) V Hănescu	7^{7}	6^{2}	6^{3}
(Serbia) B Pašanski	6^{5}	7^{7}	7^{7}
4	(Austria) A Haider-Maurer	7	6
Q	(Montenegro) G Tošić	5	1

Semifinals
(Serbia) B Pašanski	3	6	1
4	(Austria) A Haider-Maurer	6	3	6

=== Bottom half ===
First round
7	(Bosnia and Herzegovina) D Džumhur	7	6
(Canada) S Diez	5	2
Q	(Spain) Marc Giner	4	1
Q	(Chile) H Podlipnik	6	6
(France) D Guez	3	0
WC	(Romania) V Crivoi	6	6
(Slovakia) A Martin	2	2
3	(Croatia) A Veić	6	6
8	(Romania) M Copil	3	77	6
WC	(Romania) F Mergea	6	6^{5}	4
Q	(Italy) Matteo Fago	1	6^{1}
(Chile) J Aguilar	6	7^{7}
(Moldova) R Borvanov	4	4
(Chile) C Saavedra-Corvalán	6	6
(Russia) E Kirillov	2	2
2	(Romania) A Ungur	6	6

Second round
7	(Bosnia and Herzegovina) D Džumhur	4	2
Q	(Chile) H Podlipnik	6	6
WC	(Romania) V Crivoi	6	1	1
3	(Croatia) A Veić	1	6	6
8	(Romania) M Copil	3	6	3
(Chile) J Aguilar	6	3	6
(Chile) C Saavedra-Corvalán	2	2
2	(Romania) A Ungur	6	6

Quarterfinals
Q	(Chile) H Podlipnik	4	2
3	(Croatia) A Veić	6	6
(Chile) J Aguilar	0	1
2	(Romania) A Ungur	6	6

Semifinals
3	(Croatia) A Veić	1	6^{6}
2	(Romania) A Ungur	6	7^{8}
