= Róbert Varga (tennis) =

Hungarian tennis player

Robert Varga
- Country (sports): Hungary
- Born: July 30, 1988 (age 36)
- Plays: unknown
- Prize money: $19,466 USD

Singles
- Career record: 0–0 (ATP Tour level, Grand Slam level, and Davis Cup)
- Career titles: 0
- Highest ranking: No. 561 (May 11, 2009)

Grand Slam singles results
- Wimbledon Junior: Q2 (2005)

Doubles
- Career record: 4–0 (ATP Tour level, Grand Slam level, and Davis Cup)
- Career titles: 0
- Highest ranking: 805 (October 18, 2010)
- Last updated on: February 19, 2018.

Róbert Varga (also spelled Robert Varga) (born July 30, 1988) is a retired tennis player from Hungary. He played for the Hungarian Davis Cup team in 2009.

Varga has a career-high ATP singles ranking of 561, achieved on 11 May 2009. He also has a career-high ATP doubles ranking of 805, achieved on 18 October 2010.

== Future and Challenger finals ==
=== Singles: 2 (0–2) ===
Legend
Challengers 0 (0–0)
Futures 2 (0–2)

Outcome	No.	Date	Tournament	Surface	Opponent	Score
Runner-up	1.	June 22, 2008	Bucharest, Romania F8	Clay	(Romania) Victor Ioniță	6–2, 2–6, 0–6
Runner-up	2.	August 24, 2008	Mediaș, Romania F17	Clay	(Romania) Gabriel Moraru	6–7^{(5–7)}, 7–6^{(7–5)}, 3–6

=== Doubles 5 (3–2) ===
Legend
Challengers 0 (0–0)
Futures 5 (3–2)

Outcome	No.	Date	Tournament	Surface	Partner	Opponents	Score
Runner-up	1.	May 25, 2008	Budapest, Hungary F3	Clay	(Hungary) Gergely Kisgyörgy	(Slovenia) Martin Rmuš (Slovenia) Tadej Turk	6–7^{(8–10)}, 6–2, [2–10]
Winner	2.	July 13, 2008	Bucharest, Romania F11	Clay	(Ukraine) Vladislav Bondarenko	(Moldova) Radu Albot (Moldova) Andrei Ciumac	6–2, 7–6^{(7–2)}
Winner	3.	April 5, 2009	Suez, Egypt F5	Clay	(Russia) Andrey Kuznetsov	(Moldova) Radu Albot (Romania) Teodor-Dacian Crăciun	6–2, 6–4
Runner-up	4.	June 5, 2010	Koszalin, Poland F3	Clay	(Belarus) Sergey Betov	(Poland) Błażej Koniusz (Poland) Grzegorz Panfil	6–7^{(3–7)}, 3–6
Winner	5.	October 10, 2010	Antalya, Turkey F10	Hard	(Ukraine) Artem Smirnov	(Bosnia and Herzegovina) Tomislav Brkić (Serbia) Nikola Čačić	6–4, 6–4

== Davis Cup ==
=== Participations: (4–0) ===
Group membership World Group (0–0) WG Play-off (0–0) Group I (0–0) Group II (4–0) Group III (0–0) Group IV (0–0)	Matches by surface Hard (0–0) Clay (3–0) Grass (0–0) Carpet (1–0)	Matches by type Singles (0–0) Doubles (4–0)

- ▲ ▼ indicates the outcome of the Davis Cup match followed by the score, date, place of event, the zonal classification and its phase, and the court surface.

Rubber outcome	No.	Rubber	Match type (partner if any)	Opponent nation	Opponent player(s)	Score
▼2–3; 11–13 April 2008; Office du Complexe Olympique Mohamed Boudiaf Tennis Club, Algiers, Algeria; Europe/Africa First round; Clay surface
Victory	1	III	Doubles (with Kornél Bardóczky)	Algeria	Lamine Ouahab / Slimane Saoudi	6–4, 6–3, 7–5
▲5–0; 18-20 July 2008; Thessaloniki Tennis Club, Thessaloniki, Greece; Europe/Africa Relegation Play off; Clay surface
Victory	2	III	Doubles (with Kornél Bardóczky)	Greece	Charalampos Kapogiannis / Konstantinos Mikos	6–1, 6–1, 6–1
▼2–3; 6-8 March 2009; Egyetemi Sportcsarnok, Győr, Hungary; Europe/Africa First round; Carpet (indoor) surface
Victory	3	III	Doubles (with Kornél Bardóczky)	Bulgaria	Grigor Dimitrov / Todor Enev	1–6, 6–2, 3–6, 6–2, 6–2
▲3–2; 10-12 July 2009; Gödöllő Kiskastély, Gödöllő, Hungary; Europe/Africa Relegation Play off; Clay surface
Victory	4	III	Doubles (with Attila Balázs)	Moldova	Radu Albot / Andrei Ciumac	6–3, 4–6, 4–6, 7–5, 6–4
