= 2013 BRD Brașov Challenger – Singles =

Singles
- 2013 BRD Brașov Challenger

Final
- Champion: (Austria) Andreas Haider-Maurer
- Runner-up: (Austria) Gerald Melzer
- Score: 6–7^{(9–11)}, 6–4, 6–2

Events
Singles	Doubles
- BRD Brașov Challenger

Andreas Haider-Maurer is the defending champion, and successfully defended his championship by defeating Gerald Melzer in all-Austrian final by a score of 6–7^{(9–11)}, 6–4, 6–2.

== Seeds ==
1. (Austria) Andreas Haider-Maurer (champion)
2. (Romania) Adrian Ungur (second round)
3. (Germany) Julian Reister (semifinals)
4. (Serbia) Dušan Lajović (semifinals)
5. (Ukraine) Oleksandr Nedovyesov (quarterfinals)
6. (Spain) Pere Riba (first round)
7. (United Kingdom) James Ward (second round)
8. (Italy) Thomas Fabbiano (quarterfinals)

== Draw ==
Key

- Q = Qualifier
- WC = Wild card
- LL = Lucky loser
- Alt = Alternate
- ITF = ITF entry
- PR = Protected ranking
- SR = Special ranking
- SE = Special exempt
- JE = Junior exempt
- JR = Junior Accelerator Programme entrant
- CO = College Accelerator Programme entrant
- NG = Next Gen Accelerator Program entrant
- w/o = Walkover
- r = Retired
- d = Defaulted

=== Finals ===
Semifinals
1	(Austria) Andreas Haider-Maurer	6	7^{8}
4	(Serbia) Dušan Lajović	4	6^{6}
3	(Germany) Julian Reister	2	4
(Austria) Gerald Melzer	6	6

Final
1	(Austria) Andreas Haider-Maurer	6^{9}	6	6
(Austria) Gerald Melzer	7^{11}	4	2

=== Top half ===
First round
1	(Austria) A Haider-Maurer	6	6
Q	(Moldova) M Dubarenco	4	4
Q	(United Kingdom) K Edmund	6	6
(Slovakia) N Gombos	1	4
(France) L Pouille	6	6
(Czech Republic) J Pospíšil	3	4
(Spain) R Carballés Baena	6	7^{7}
6	(Spain) P Riba	1	6^{2}
4	(Serbia) D Lajović	6	3	7^{9}
WC	(Romania) Dragoș Cristian Mîrtea	0	6	6^{7}
LL	(United Kingdom) O Golding	6	3	6
(Greece) T Angelinos	4	6	4
(Canada) S Diez	7^{7}	6
Q	(France) M Bourgue	6^{2}	3
(Slovenia) B Rola	6^{4}	4
5	(Ukraine) O Nedovyesov	7^{7}	6

Second round
1	(Austria) A Haider-Maurer	w/o
Q	(United Kingdom) K Edmund
(France) L Pouille	7^{7}	4	6
(Spain) R Carballés Baena	6^{5}	6	4
4	(Serbia) D Lajović	6	6
LL	(United Kingdom) O Golding	1	2
(Canada) S Diez	1	3
5	(Ukraine) O Nedovyesov	6	6

Quarterfinals
1	(Austria) A Haider-Maurer	6	6
(France) L Pouille	4	2
4	(Serbia) D Lajović	6	6
5	(Ukraine) O Nedovyesov	3	4

Semifinals
1	(Austria) A Haider-Maurer	6	7^{8}
4	(Serbia) D Lajović	4	6^{6}

=== Bottom half ===
First round
8	(Italy) T Fabbiano	3	6	6
(Belgium) G Gigounon	6	2	4
Q	(Romania) T-D Crăciun	7^{7}	7^{7}
(France) A Michon	6^{5}	6^{5}
WC	(Romania) F Mergea	6	6
(Chile) H Podlipnik-Castillo	2	0
(Italy) L Giustino	4	1
3	(Germany) J Reister	6	6
7	(United Kingdom) J Ward	3	6	7^{7}
(Belgium) Y Reuter	6	3	6^{5}
(Spain) E López-Pérez	4	1^{r}
(Austria) G Melzer	6	2
WC	(Romania) Andrei Pătrui	2	4
WC	(Romania) P Ciorcilă	6	6
(Romania) V Crivoi	6	3^{r}
2	(Romania) A Ungur	1	5

Second round
8	(Italy) T Fabbiano	7	7^{7}
Q	(Romania) T-D Crăciun	5	6^{5}
WC	(Romania) F Mergea	5	2
3	(Germany) J Reister	7	6
7	(United Kingdom) J Ward	4	2
(Austria) G Melzer	6	6
WC	(Romania) P Ciorcilă	7^{7}	6
2	(Romania) A Ungur	6^{5}	3

Quarterfinals
8	(Italy) T Fabbiano	5	4
3	(Germany) J Reister	7	6
(Austria) G Melzer	6	6
WC	(Romania) P Ciorcilă	4	4

Semifinals
3	(Germany) J Reister	2	4
(Austria) G Melzer	6	6
