= 2013 BRD Brașov Challenger – Doubles =

Doubles
- 2013 BRD Brașov Challenger

Final
- Champions: (Ukraine) Oleksandr Nedovyesov (Czech Republic) Jaroslav Pospíšil
- Runners-up: (Romania) Teodor-Dacian Crăciun (Romania) Petru-Alexandru Luncanu
- Score: 6–3, 6–1

Events
Singles	Doubles
- BRD Brașov Challenger

Marius Copil and Victor Crivoi were the defending champions but Copil decided not to participate.
Crivoi played alongside Patrick Ciorcilă, but lost to Jamie Delgado and Jordan Kerr in the first round.

Oleksandr Nedovyesov and Jaroslav Pospíšil defeated Teodor-Dacian Crăciun and Petru-Alexandru Luncanu in the finals 6–3, 6–1.

== Seeds ==
1. (United Kingdom) Jamie Delgado / (Australia) Jordan Kerr (quarterfinals)
2. (Ukraine) Oleksandr Nedovyesov / (Czech Republic) Jaroslav Pospíšil (champions)
3. (Philippines) Ruben Gonzales / (United Kingdom) Darren Walsh (semifinals)
4. (Greece) Theodoros Angelinos / (Chile) Hans Podlipnik-Castillo (first round)

== Draw ==
Key

- Q = Qualifier
- WC = Wild card
- LL = Lucky loser
- Alt = Alternate
- ITF = ITF entry
- PR = Protected ranking
- SR = Special ranking
- SE = Special exempt
- JE = Junior exempt
- JR = Junior Accelerator Programme entrant
- CO = College Accelerator Programme entrant
- NG = Next Gen Accelerator Program entrant
- w/o = Walkover
- r = Retired
- d = Defaulted

=== Draw ===
First round
1	(United Kingdom) J Delgado (Australia) J Kerr	7^{7}	4	[10]
(Romania) P Ciorcilă (Romania) V Crivoi	6^{3}	6	[6]
(Romania) C-I Gârd (Romania) Tudor Sulea	2	3
(Romania) T-D Crăciun (Romania) P-A Luncanu	6	6
3	(Philippines) R Gonzales (United Kingdom) D Walsh	6	6
WC	(Romania) Sebastian Kraila (Romania) Dragoș Cristian Mîrtea	0	3
(Austria) Philip Lang (Austria) G Melzer	6	6
(Romania) Andrei Cociașu (Romania) M-I Miron	2	2
Alt	(Spain) Alex Gallardo (Spain) P Riba
(Canada) S Diez (Serbia) D Lajović	w/o
(Romania) F Mergea (Romania) Andrei Pătrui	6	6
4	(Greece) T Angelinos (Chile) H Podlipnik-Castillo	2	0
(Romania) Alexandru-Daniel Carpen (Czech Republic) Libor Salaba	6	7^{7}
(France) A Michon (France) L Pouille	4	6^{4}
(Romania) P Grigoriu (Romania) András Székely	3	6	[7]
2	(Ukraine) O Nedovyesov (Czech Republic) J Pospíšil	6	2	[10]

Quarterfinals
1	(United Kingdom) J Delgado (Australia) J Kerr	6	2	[4]
(Romania) T-D Crăciun (Romania) P-A Luncanu	4	6	[10]
3	(Philippines) R Gonzales (United Kingdom) D Walsh	6	6^{5}	[10]
(Austria) P Lang (Austria) G Melzer	1	7^{7}	[7]
Alt	(Spain) A Gallardo (Spain) P Riba	2	3
(Romania) F Mergea (Romania) A Pătrui	6	6
(Romania) A-D Carpen (Czech Republic) L Salaba	2	1
2	(Ukraine) O Nedovyesov (Czech Republic) J Pospíšil	6	6

Semifinals
(Romania) T-D Crăciun (Romania) P-A Luncanu	6	6
(Austria) P Lang (Austria) G Melzer	2	4
(Romania) F Mergea (Romania) A Pătrui	1	3
2	(Ukraine) O Nedovyesov (Czech Republic) J Pospíšil	6	6

Final
(Romania) T-D Crăciun (Romania) P-A Luncanu	3	1
2	(Ukraine) O Nedovyesov (Czech Republic) J Pospíšil	6	6
