= 2011 Ropharma Brașov Challenger =

- Date: September 5 – September 11
- Edition: 16th
- Location: Brașov, Romania

Champions

Singles
- (France) Benoît Paire

Doubles
- (Romania) Victor Anagnastopol / (Romania) Florin Mergea
← 2010 ·	Ropharma Brașov Challenger	· 2012 →

The 2011 Ropharma Brașov Challenger was a professional tennis tournament played on outdoor red clay courts. It was the 16th edition of the tournament which was part of the 2011 ATP Challenger Tour. It took place in Brașov, Romania between 5 September and 11 September 2011.

== ATP entrants ==
=== Seeds ===
Country	Player	Rank^{1}	Seed
AUT	Andreas Haider-Maurer	73	1
SVN	Blaž Kavčič	80	2
FRA	Benoît Paire	120	3
ROU	Adrian Ungur	136	4
GER	Andreas Beck	138	5
CZE	Jan Hájek	152	6
FRA	Maxime Teixeira	176	7
CRO	Antonio Veić	182	8

- ^{1} Rankings are as of August 29, 2011.

=== Other entrants ===
The following players received wildcards into the singles main draw:

- (Romania) Victor Anagnastopol
- (Moldova) Andrei Ciumac
- (Romania) Gabriel Moraru
- (Romania) Răzvan Sabău

The following players received entry from the qualifying draw:

- (Romania) Cătălin Gârd
- (Czech Republic) Michal Konečný
- (Romania) Andrei Mlendea
- (United Kingdom) Morgan Phillips

== Champions ==
=== Singles ===
(France) Benoît Paire def. (France) Maxime Teixeira, 6–4, 3–0, ret.

=== Doubles ===
(Romania) Victor Anagnastopol / (Romania) Florin Mergea def. (Czech Republic) Dušan Lojda / (France) Benoît Paire, 6–2, 6–3
