= 2014 BRD Brașov Challenger – Singles =

Singles
- 2014 BRD Brașov Challenger

Final
- Champion: (Austria) Andreas Haider-Maurer
- Runner-up: (France) Guillaume Rufin
- Score: 6–3, 6–2

Events
Singles	Doubles
- BRD Brașov Challenger

Andreas Haider-Maurer became a three-time consecutive champion after he defended his title, defeating Guillaume Rufin 6–3, 6–2.

== Seeds ==
1. (Austria) Andreas Haider-Maurer (champion)
2. (Spain) Pere Riba (first round)
3. (Argentina) Facundo Argüello (first round)
4. (Romania) Adrian Ungur (quarterfinals)
5. (Austria) Gerald Melzer (second round)
6. (United States) Chase Buchanan (second round)
7. (Romania) Marius Copil (second round)
8. (Czech Republic) Jaroslav Pospíšil (SemiFinals)

== Draw ==
Key

- Q = Qualifier
- WC = Wild card
- LL = Lucky loser
- Alt = Alternate
- ITF = ITF entry
- PR = Protected ranking
- SR = Special ranking
- SE = Special exempt
- JE = Junior exempt
- JR = Junior Accelerator Programme entrant
- CO = College Accelerator Programme entrant
- NG = Next Gen Accelerator Program entrant
- w/o = Walkover
- r = Retired
- d = Defaulted

=== Finals ===
Semifinals
1	(Austria) Andreas Haider-Maurer	7	6
8	(Czech Republic) Jaroslav Pospíšil	5	2
(Russia) Aslan Karatsev	6^{6}	2
Q	(France) Guillaume Rufin	7^{8}	6

Final
1	(Austria) Andreas Haider-Maurer	6	6
Q	(France) Guillaume Rufin	3	2

=== Top half ===
First round
1	(Austria) A Haider-Maurer	6	6
(Spain) E López-Pérez	1	4
(Belgium) Y Reuter	6	6
Q	(Italy) Giulio Torroni	4	4
WC	(Romania) P-A Luncanu	6	6
WC	(Romania) VV Cornea	3	2
Q	(Venezuela) R Rodríguez	1	2
6	(United States) C Buchanan	6	6
4	(Romania) A Ungur	6	6
(Romania) V Crivoi	4	4
(Portugal) R Machado	7^{9}	6
(Czech Republic) J Mertl	6^{7}	2
LL	(Italy) Claudio Fortuna	6	6
WC	(Romania) P Ciorcila	4	2
WC	(Romania) D Dima	1	3
8	(Czech Republic) J Pospíšil	6	6

Second round
1	(Austria) A Haider-Maurer	7^{7}	6^{7}	6
(Belgium) Y Reuter	6^{3}	7^{9}	1
WC	(Romania) P-A Luncanu	6	1	6
6	(United States) C Buchanan	4	6	3
4	(Romania) A Ungur	7^{7}	6
(Portugal) R Machado	6^{3}	1
LL	(Italy) C Fortuna	3	1
8	(Czech Republic) J Pospíšil	6	6

Quarterfinals
1	(Austria) A Haider-Maurer	6	6
WC	(Romania) P-A Luncanu	4	0
4	(Romania) A Ungur	2	5
8	(Czech Republic) J Pospíšil	6	7

Semifinals
1	(Austria) A Haider-Maurer	7	6
8	(Czech Republic) J Pospíšil	5	2

=== Bottom half ===
First round
7	(Romania) M Copil	6	6
(Serbia) P Krstin	3	4
(France) J Eysseric	6^{3}	4
(Russia) A Karatsev	7^{7}	6
(Russia) V Rudnev	4	4
(Slovakia) Adrian Sikora	6	6
(France) M Bourgue	6	2	6
3	(Argentina) F Argüello	4	6	4
5	(Austria) G Melzer	6	6
Q	(Serbia) M Janković	4	4
Q	(France) G Rufin	7^{7}	6
(Italy) F Cipolla	6^{4}	3
(Lithuania) L Grigelis	6	4	6
Alt	(France) L Pouille	3	6	4
(Italy) R Marcora	4	6	6
2	(Spain) P Riba	6	1	2

Second round
7	(Romania) M Copil	3	3
(Russia) A Karatsev	6	6
(Slovakia) A Sikora	6	6
(France) M Bourgue	3	4
5	(Austria) G Melzer	6^{5}	0
Q	(France) G Rufin	7^{7}	6
(Lithuania) L Grigelis	6	6
(Italy) R Marcora	2	4

Quarterfinals
(Russia) A Karatsev	6	7^{7}
(Slovakia) A Sikora	3	6^{5}
Q	(France) G Rufin	7	6^{5}	6
(Lithuania) L Grigelis	5	7^{7}	2

Semifinals
(Russia) A Karatsev	6^{6}	2
Q	(France) G Rufin	7^{8}	6
