= 2014 BRD Brașov Challenger – Doubles =

Doubles
- 2014 BRD Brașov Challenger

Final
- Champions: (Italy) Daniele Giorgini (Romania) Adrian Ungur
- Runners-up: (Russia) Aslan Karatsev (Russia) Valery Rudnev
- Score: 4–6, 7–6^{(7–4)}, [10–1]

Events
Singles	Doubles
← 2013 ·	BRD Brașov Challenger	· 2015 →

Daniele Giorgini and Adrian Ungur won he title, beating Aslan Karatsev and Valery Rudnev 4–6, 7–6^{(7–4)}, [10–1].

== Seeds ==
1. (Czech Republic) Roman Jebavý / (Czech Republic) Jaroslav Pospíšil (quarterfinals)
2. (Germany) Gero Kretschmer / (Austria) Gerald Melzer (first round)
3. (Argentina) Facundo Argüello / (Spain) Enrique López-Pérez (semifinals)
4. (Italy) Flavio Cipolla / (Lithuania) Laurynas Grigelis (first round)

== Draw ==
=== Key ===
- Q = Qualifier
- WC = Wild card
- LL = Lucky loser
- Alt = Alternate
- ITF = ITF entry
- PR = Protected ranking
- SR = Special ranking
- SE = Special exempt
- JE = Junior exempt
- JR = Junior Accelerator Programme entrant
- CO = College Accelerator Programme entrant
- NG = Next Gen Accelerator Program entrant
- w/o = Walkover
- r = Retired
- d = Defaulted

=== Draw ===
First round
1	(Czech Republic) R Jebavý (Czech Republic) J Pospíšil	6	6
(France) J Eysseric (Croatia) A Veić	4	4
(Russia) A Karatsev (Russia) V Rudnev	6	5	[10]
WC	(Serbia) M Janković (Romania) Andrei Patrui	2	7	[2]
3	(Argentina) F Argüello (Spain) E López-Pérez	6	6
(Serbia) N Čačić (Serbia) P Krstin	3	2
(Czech Republic) J Mertl (Slovakia) Adrian Sikora	6^{8}	6	[5]
(France) M Bourgue (France) G Rufin	7^{10}	3	[10]
(Romania) M Copil (Romania) V Crivoi	6	6
WC	(Romania) Tudor Sulea (Romania) Luca George Tatomir	3	3
(Italy) D Giorgini (Romania) A Ungur	7	7^{7}
4	(Italy) F Cipolla (Lithuania) L Grigelis	5	6^{3}
(Romania) Alexandru-Daniel Carpen (United Kingdom) D Walsh	1	6	[10]
(Portugal) R Machado (Spain) P Riba	6	4	[12]
WC	(Romania) P Grigoriu (Romania) C Pavăl	5	6	[10]
2	(Germany) G Kretschmer (Austria) G Melzer	7	1	[8]

Quarterfinals
1	(Czech Republic) R Jebavý (Czech Republic) J Pospíšil	6	3	[5]
(Russia) A Karatsev (Russia) V Rudnev	3	5	[10]
3	(Argentina) F Argüello (Spain) E López-Pérez	6	6
(France) M Bourgue (France) G Rufin	4	4
(Romania) M Copil (Romania) V Crivoi	3	2
(Italy) D Giorgini (Romania) A Ungur	6	6
(Portugal) R Machado (Spain) P Riba	4	3
WC	(Romania) P Grigoriu (Romania) C Pavăl	6	6

Semifinals
(Russia) A Karatsev (Russia) V Rudnev	7^{7}	7^{7}
3	(Argentina) F Argüello (Spain) E López-Pérez	6^{5}	6^{3}
(Italy) D Giorgini (Romania) A Ungur	6	6
WC	(Romania) P Grigoriu (Romania) C Pavăl	4	3

Final
(Russia) A Karatsev (Russia) V Rudnev	6	6^{4}	[1]
(Italy) D Giorgini (Romania) A Ungur	4	7^{7}	[10]
