= 2013 BRD Brașov Challenger =

- Date: 2 – 8 September
- Edition: 18th
- Surface: Clay
- Location: Brașov, Romania

Champions

Singles
- (Austria) Andreas Haider-Maurer

Doubles
- (Ukraine) Aleksandr Nedovyesov / (Czech Republic) Jaroslav Pospíšil
← 2012 ·	BRD Brașov Challenger	· 2014 →

The 2013 BRD Brașov Challenger was a professional tennis tournament, played on clay courts, that took place in Brașov, Romania from 2 to 8 September 2013. It was the 18th edition of the BRD Brașov Challenger tournament and part of the 2013 ATP Challenger Tour.

In singles, Austrian player Andreas Haider-Maurer defeated fellow Austrian Gerald Melzer. In doubles, Ukrainian Aleksandr Nedovyesov and Jaroslav Pospíšil of the Czech Republic defeated Romanian players Teodor-Dacian Crăciun and Petru-Alexandru Luncanu.

== Singles main draw entrants ==
=== Seeds ===
Country	Player	Rank^{1}	Seed
AUT	Andreas Haider-Maurer	88	1
ROU	Adrian Ungur	105	2
GER	Julian Reister	117	3
SRB	Dušan Lajović	144	4
UKR	Oleksandr Nedovyesov	153	5
ESP	Pere Riba	156	6
GBR	James Ward	174	7
ITA	Thomas Fabbiano	176	8

- ^{1} Rankings are as of August 26, 2013.

=== Other entrants ===
The following players received wildcards into the singles main draw:

- (Romania) Patrick Ciorcilă
- (Romania) Florin Mergea
- (Romania) Dragoș Cristian Mîrtea
- (Romania) Andrei Pătrui

The following players received entry from the qualifying draw:

- (Moldova) Maxim Dubarenco
- (United Kingdom) Kyle Edmund
- (France) Mathias Bourgue
- (Romania) Teodor-Dacian Crăciun

The following players received entry as a lucky loser the singles main draw:

- (United Kingdom) Oliver Golding

== Champions ==
=== Singles ===
- (Austria) Andreas Haider-Maurer def. (Austria) Gerald Melzer 6–7^{(9–11)}, 6–4, 6–2

=== Doubles ===
- (Ukraine) Oleksandr Nedovyesov / (Czech Republic) Jaroslav Pospíšil def. (Romania) Teodor-Dacian Crăciun / (Romania) Petru-Alexandru Luncanu 6–3, 6–1
