= 2009 Brașov Challenger =

- Date: August 31 – September 6
- Edition: 14th
- Location: Brașov, Romania

Champions

Singles
- (Netherlands) Thiemo de Bakker

Doubles
- (Spain) Pere Riba / (Spain) Pablo Santos
- Brașov Challenger

The 2009 Brașov Challenger was a professional tennis tournament played on outdoor red clay courts. This was the 14th edition of the tournament which was part of the 2009 ATP Challenger Tour. It took place in Brașov, Romania between 31 August and 6 September 2009.

== Singles main draw entrants ==
=== Seeds ===
Nationality	Player	Ranking*	Seeding
NED	Thiemo de Bakker	151	1
ESP	Pere Riba	156	2
SVK	Kamil Čapkovič	212	3
ESP	Carles Poch-Gradin	215	4
ESP	Iñigo Cervantes-Huegun	225	5
ESP	Pablo Santos	234	6
ESP	Miguel Ángel López Jaén	254	7
NED	Raemon Sluiter	264	8

- Rankings are as of August 24, 2009.

=== Other entrants ===
The following players received wildcards into the singles main draw:

- (Romania) Marius Copil
- (Romania) Cătălin Gârd
- (Romania) Andrei Mlendea
- (Romania) Răzvan Sabău

The following players received entry from the qualifying draw:

- (Romania) Alexandru Carpen
- (Romania) Ilie-Aurelian Giurgiu
- (Egypt) Karim Maamoun
- (Romania) Adrian Ungur

== Champions ==
=== Singles ===
(Netherlands) Thiemo de Bakker def. (Spain) Pere Riba, 7–5, 6–0

=== Doubles ===
(Spain) Pere Riba / (Spain) Pablo Santos def. (Italy) Simone Vagnozzi / (Italy) Uros Vico, 6–3, 6–2
