= 2010 Brașov Challenger =

- Date: September 7 – September 12
- Edition: 15th
- Location: Brașov, Romania

Champions

Singles
- (France) Éric Prodon

Doubles
- (Italy) Flavio Cipolla / (Italy) Daniele Giorgini
- Brașov Challenger

The 2010 Brașov Challenger was a professional tennis tournament played on outdoor red clay courts. This was the 15th edition of the tournament which is part of the 2010 ATP Challenger Tour. It took place in Brașov, Romania between 7 September and 12 September 2010.

== ATP entrants ==
=== Seeds ===
Nationality	Player	Ranking*	Seeding
GER	Daniel Brands	75	1
ROU	Adrian Ungur	127	2
CZE	Dušan Lojda	169	3
ROU	Victor Crivoi	171	4
ITA	Alessio di Mauro	207	5
ITA	Flavio Cipolla	208	6
FRA	Éric Prodon	213	7
AUT	Andreas Haider-Maurer	214	8

- Rankings are as of August 30, 2010.

=== Other entrants ===
The following players received wildcards into the singles main draw:

- (Romania) Victor Anagnastopol
- (Germany) Daniel Brands
- (Romania) Sebastian Pădure
- (Romania) Răzvan Sabău

The following players received entry as an alternate:

- (Romania) Petru-Alexandru Luncanu

The following players received entry from the qualifying draw:

- (Hungary) Kornél Bardóczky
- (Romania) Adrian Cruciat
- (Romania) Laurenţiu-Ady Gavrilă
- (Egypt) Karim Maamoun

The following players received entry as a Lucky Loser:

- (Moldova) Radu Albot

== Champions ==
=== Singles ===
(France) Éric Prodon def. (Czech Republic) Jaroslav Pospíšil, 7–6(1), 6–3

=== Doubles ===
(Italy) Flavio Cipolla / (Italy) Daniele Giorgini def. (Moldova) Radu Albot / (Moldova) Andrei Ciumac, 6–3, 6–4
