= 2014 BRD Brașov Challenger =

- Date: 1 – 7 September
- Edition: 19th
- Surface: Clay
- Location: Brașov, Romania

Champions

Singles
- (Austria) Andreas Haider-Maurer

Doubles
- (Italy) Daniele Giorgini / (Romania) Adrian Ungur
← 2013 ·	BRD Brașov Challenger	· 2015 →

The 2014 BRD Brașov Challenger was a professional tennis tournament played on clay courts. It was the 19th edition of the tournament which was part of the 2014 ATP Challenger Tour. It took place in Brașov, Romania between 1 and 7 September 2014.

== Singles main-draw entrants ==
=== Seeds ===
Country	Player	Rank^{1}	Seed
AUT	Andreas Haider-Maurer	110	1
ESP	Pere Riba	116	2
ARG	Facundo Argüello	120	3
ROM	Adrian Ungur	137	4
AUT	Gerald Melzer	145	5
USA	Chase Buchanan	158	6
ROM	Marius Copil	175	7
CZE	Jaroslav Pospíšil	195	8

- ^{1} Rankings are as of August 25, 2014.

=== Other entrants ===
The following players received wildcards into the singles main draw:

- (Romania) Patrick Ciorcilă
- (Romania) Victor Vlad Cornea
- (Romania) Dragoș Dima
- (Romania) Petru-Alexandru Luncanu

The following player entered into the singles main draw as alternate:

- (France) Lucas Pouille

The following players received entry from the qualifying draw:

- (Serbia) Miki Janković
- (Venezuela) Ricardo Rodríguez
- (France) Guillaume Rufin
- (Italy) Giulio Torroni

== Champions ==
=== Singles ===
- (Austria) Andreas Haider-Maurer def. (France) Guillaume Rufin 6–3, 6–2

=== Doubles ===
- (Italy) Daniele Giorgini / (Romania) Adrian Ungur def. (Russia) Aslan Karatsev / (Russia) Valery Rudnev 4–6, 7–6^{(7–4)}, [10–1]
