= Ionuț Moldovan =

Romanian tennis player

Ionuţ Moldovan
- Country (sports): Romania
- Residence: Bucharest
- Born: 17 January 1978 (age 47); Constanța, Romania
- Height: 1.88 m (6 ft 2 in)
- Turned pro: 1996
- Plays: Right-handed
- Prize money: $222,260

Singles
- Career record: 4-15
- Career titles: 0
- Highest ranking: No. 111 (11 Aug 1997)

Doubles
- Career record: No. 125 (6 Aug 2001)
- Career titles: 0
- Highest ranking: 6–13

Ionuţ "Ion" Moldovan (born 17 January 1978) is a former professional tennis player from Romania.

He was Vice-President of the Romanian Tennis Federation from 2013 to 2015.

== Career ==
Moldovan had his best results on the ATP Tour at the 1996 Open Romania, where he was a singles quarter-finalist and in 2005, when he made the semi-finals of the same event, this time in the doubles, with countryman Gabriel Moraru.

He played one Masters Series tournament, the 2000 Stuttgart Masters. In that tournament he partnered Andrei Pavel in the doubles and the pair were eliminated in the first round by Pablo Albano and Jaime Oncins.

The Romanian played five Davis Cup matches (three World Group matches) for his country, four in singles and one in doubles, all of which were lost.

He comes from a family of athletes. His father Ion is a former soccer player and head coach of Dinamo Bucharest. Valentina, his mother, is a former handball player for Hidrotehnica Constanta. He also has a sister Mihaela who was a tennis player, with a highest WTA ranking of 390. She played Fed Cup for Romania.

== Challenger titles ==
=== Singles: (2) ===
No.	Year	Tournament	Surface	Opponent	Score
1.	1997	Brasov, Romania	Clay	(Romania) Dinu Pescariu	6–2, 6–4
2.	1997	Scheveningen, Netherlands	Clay	(Spain) Salvador Navarro	3–6, 7–5, 6–2

=== Doubles: (7) ===
No.	Year	Tournament	Surface	Partner	Opponents	Score
1.	2000	Sylt, Germany	Clay	(Kazakhstan) Yuri Schukin	(Australia) Ashley Fisher (South Africa) Gareth Williams	6–4, 6–2
2.	2000	Freudenstadt, Germany	Clay	(Kazakhstan) Yuri Schukin	(Austria) Julian Knowle (Switzerland) Jean-Claude Scherrer	3–6, 6–3, 6–4
3.	2000	Brasov, Romania	Clay	(Kazakhstan) Yuri Schukin	(Belgium) Dick Norman (Austria) Wolfgang Schranz	6–4, 6–1
4.	2000	Tangier, Morocco	Clay	(Kazakhstan) Yuri Schukin	(Argentina) Cristian Kordasz (Brazil) Cristiano Testa	6–4, 2–6, 6–2
5.	2003	Banja Luka, Bosnia & Herzegovina	Clay	(Kazakhstan) Yuri Schukin	(Serbia and Montenegro) Nikola Ćirić (Montenegro) Goran Tošić	6–2, 7–5
6.	2005	Timișoara, Romania	Clay	(Romania) Gabriel Moraru	(Bulgaria) Ilia Kushev (Bulgaria) Radoslav Lukaev	6–2, 6–0
7.	2005	Brasov, Romania	Clay	(Romania) Gabriel Moraru	(Netherlands) Melvyn op der Heijde (Netherlands) Dennis van Scheppingen	6–1, 6–4
