= 2013 Banja Luka Challenger =

- Date: 7–15 September
- Edition: 12th
- Surface: Clay
- Location: Banja Luka, Bosnia and Herzegovina

Champions

Singles
- (Slovenia) Aljaž Bedene

Doubles
- (Croatia) Marin Draganja / (Croatia) Nikola Mektić
← 2012 ·	Banja Luka Challenger	· 2014 →

The 2013 Banja Luka Challenger was a professional tennis tournament played on clay courts. It was the twelfth edition of the tournament which was part of the 2013 ATP Challenger Tour. It took place in Banja Luka, Bosnia and Herzegovina from 7 to 15 September 2013.

== Singles main draw entrants ==
=== Seeds ===
Country	Player	Rank^{1}	Seed
ITA	Filippo Volandri	101	1
SVN	Aljaž Bedene	106	2
GER	Julian Reister	117	3
ARG	Diego Sebastián Schwartzman	133	4
UKR	Oleksandr Nedovyesov	153	5
GER	Simon Greul	161	6
CZE	Jan Mertl	177	7
ITA	Marco Cecchinato	186	8

- ^{1} Rankings are as of August 26, 2013.

=== Other entrants ===
The following players received wildcards into the singles main draw:

- (Serbia) Laslo Đere
- (Serbia) Djordje Djokovic
- (Serbia) Peđa Krstin
- (Slovenia) Mike Urbanija

The following players received entry from the qualifying draw:

- (Croatia) Marin Bradarić
- (Poland) Piotr Gadomski
- (Croatia) Ante Pavić
- (Serbia) Danilo Petrović

The following players received entry as a lucky losers:

- (Serbia) Ivan Bjelica

== Champions ==
=== Singles ===
- (Slovenia) Aljaž Bedene def. (Argentina) Diego Schwartzman 6–3, 6–4

=== Doubles ===
- (Croatia) Marin Draganja / (Croatia) Nikola Mektić def. (Germany) Dominik Meffert / (Ukraine) Oleksandr Nedovyesov 6–4, 3–6, [10–6]
