= 2012 BRD Brașov Challenger =

- Date: 3 – 9 September
- Edition: 17th
- Surface: Clay
- Location: Brașov, Romania

Champions

Singles
- (Austria) Andreas Haider-Maurer

Doubles
- (Romania) Marius Copil / (Romania) Victor Crivoi
← 2011 ·	BRD Brașov Challenger	· 2013 →

The 2012 BRD Brașov Challenger was a professional tennis tournament played on clay courts. It was the 17th edition of the tournament which was part of the 2012 ATP Challenger Tour. It took place in Brașov, Romania between 3 and 9 September 2012.

== Singles main draw entrants ==
=== Seeds ===
Country	Player	Rank^{1}	Seed
ROU	Victor Hănescu	102	1
ROU	Adrian Ungur	110	2
CRO	Antonio Veić	135	3
AUT	Andreas Haider-Maurer	156	4
ESP	Javier Martí	180	5
ESP	Arnau Brugués-Davi	185	6
BIH	Damir Džumhur	208	7
ROU	Marius Copil	217	8

- ^{1} Rankings are as of August 27, 2012.

=== Other entrants ===
The following players received wildcards into the singles main draw:

- (Moldova) Andrei Ciumac
- (Romania) Victor Crivoi
- (Romania) Petru-Alexandru Luncanu
- (Romania) Florin Mergea

The following players received entry from the qualifying draw:

- (Italy) Matteo Fago
- (Spain) Marc Giner
- (Chile) Hans Podlipnik
- (Montenegro) Goran Tošić

== Champions ==
=== Singles ===
- (Austria) Andreas Haider-Maurer def. (Romania) Adrian Ungur, 3–6, 7–5, 6–2

=== Doubles ===
- (Romania) Marius Copil / (Romania) Victor Crivoi def. (Moldova) Andrei Ciumac / (Ukraine) Oleksandr Nedovyesov, 6–7^{(8–10)}, 6–4, [12–10]
