= Andrei Ciumac =

Moldovan tennis player

- Country (sports): Moldova
- Born: 10 September 1985 (age 40) Chișinău, Moldovian SSR, Soviet Union
- Plays: Right-handed (double-handed forehand)
- Prize money: $56,024

Singles
- Career record: 0–2
- Career titles: 0
- Highest ranking: No. 556 (13 May 2013)

Doubles
- Career record: 2–6
- Career titles: 0
- Highest ranking: No. 260 (27 May 2013)
- Last updated on: 20 May 2019.

Andrei Ciumac (born 10 September 1985) is a Moldovan professional tennis player. He has been a member of the Moldova Davis Cup team.

== Future and Challenger finals ==
=== Singles: 2 (0-2) ===
Legend
ATP Challengers (0–0)
ITF Futures (0–2)

Titles by surface
Hard (0–2)
Clay (0–0)
Grass (0–0)
Carpet (0–0)

Result	W–L	Date	Tournament	Tier	Surface	Opponent	Score
Loss	0–1	Sep 2012	Belek Turkey F37	Futures	Hard	(Czech Republic) Adam Pavlásek	1–6, 3–6
Loss	0–2	Nov 2013	Belek Turkey F43	Futures	Hard	(Moldova) Maxim Dubarenco	1–4 RET

=== Doubles: 43 (19–24) ===
Legend
ATP Challengers 2 (0–2)
ITF Futures 41 (19–22)

Titles by surface
Hard (5–10)
Clay (14–14)
Grass (0–0)
Carpet (0–0)

Result	W–L	Date	Tournament	Tier	Surface	Partner	Opponents	Score
Loss	0–1	Aug 2007	Arad Romania F16	Futures	Clay	(Romania) Dragos Cristian Mirtea	(Argentina) Martín Alund (Romania) Raian Luchici	3–6, 6–7^{(4–7)}
Loss	0–2	Jun 2008	Bacău Romania F6	Futures	Clay	(Moldova) Radu Albot	(Romania) Teodor-Dacian Crăciun (Romania) Victor Ioniță	3–6, 6–3, [7–10]
Loss	0–3	Jul 2008	Bucharest Romania F11	Futures	Clay	(Moldova) Radu Albot	(Ukraine) Vladislav Bondarenko (Hungary) Róbert Varga	2–6, 6–7^{(2–7)}
Loss	0–4	Jul 2008	Târgu Mureș Romania F13	Futures	Clay	(Moldova) Radu Albot	(Italy) Andrea Arnaboldi (Ukraine) Vladislav Bondarenko	7–5, 0–6, [1–10]
Win	1–4	Aug 2008	Oradea Romania F14	Futures	Clay	(Moldova) Radu Albot	(Australia) Steven Goh (Australia) Zachary van Min	7–6^{(7–5)}, 6–7^{(5–7)}, [10–3]
Loss	1–5	May 2009	Craiova Romania F1	Futures	Clay	(Moldova) Radu Albot	(Romania) Marius Copil (Romania) Petru-Alexandru Luncanu	5–7, 1–6
Win	2–5	May 2009	Bucharest Romania F2	Futures	Clay	(Moldova) Radu Albot	(Romania) Florin Mergea (Romania) Costin Pavăl	6–1, 6–2
Loss	2–6	Jun 2009	Bacău Romania F5	Futures	Clay	(Moldova) Radu Albot	(Germany) Tobias Klein (Switzerland) Alexander Sadecky	4–6, 3–6
Win	3–6	May 2010	Pitești Romania F2	Futures	Clay	(Moldova) Radu Albot	(Ukraine) Ivan Anikanov (Ukraine) Artem Smirnov	2–6, 6–3, [10–7]
Loss	3–7	Aug 2010	Arad Romania F9	Futures	Clay	(Moldova) Radu Albot	(Romania) Alexandru-Daniel Carpen (Romania) Alexandru Cătălin Marasin	4–6, 5–7
Loss	3–8	Sep 2010	Braşov, Romania	Challenger	Clay	(Moldova) Radu Albot	(Italy) Flavio Cipolla (Italy) Daniele Giorgini	3–6, 4–6
Loss	3–9	Mar 2011	Antalya Turkey F10	Futures	Clay	(Moldova) Radu Albot	(Croatia) Toni Androić (Croatia) Dino Marcan	1–6, 2–6
Loss	3–10	May 2011	Antalya Turkey F15	Futures	Hard	(Russia) Dmitri Sitak	(Turkey) Tuna Altuna (Australia) Brydan Klein	4–6, 3–6
Win	4–10	May 2011	Samsun Turkey F18	Futures	Hard	(Ukraine) Denys Molchanov	(Republic of Ireland) Sam Barry (Republic of Ireland) Barry King	7–6^{(7–3)}, 2–6, [10–8]
Win	5–10	May 2011	Antalya Turkey F19	Futures	Hard	(Ukraine) Denys Molchanov	(Republic of Ireland) Daniel Glancy (Republic of Ireland) Barry King	7–5, 7–6^{(7–3)}
Win	6–10	Jul 2011	Focșani Romania F5	Futures	Clay	(Romania) Alexandru-Daniel Carpen	(Sweden) Jesper Brunström (Sweden) Markus Eriksson	6–3, 6–7^{(4–7)}, [10–4]
Loss	6–11	Jul 2011	İzmir Turkey F20	Futures	Clay	(Russia) Ivan Nedelko	(Greece) Paris Gemouchidis (Greece) Alexandros Jakupovic	W/O
Loss	6–12	Aug 2011	İzmir Turkey F22	Futures	Clay	(Greece) Paris Gemouchidis	(Australia) Brydan Klein (Australia) Dane Propoggia	6–3, 3–6, [5–10]
Loss	6–13	Aug 2011	Moscow Russia F5	Futures	Clay	(Sweden) Patrik Brydolf	(Russia) Alexander Pavlioutchenkov (Russia) Stanislav Vovk	3–6, 7–6^{(7–5)}, [6–10]
Win	7–13	Aug 2011	Iași Romania F7	Futures	Clay	(Moldova) Maxim Dubarenco	(Romania) Victor-Mugurel Anagnastopol (Romania) Florin Mergea	6–2, 2–6, [11–9]
Loss	7–14	Sep 2011	Braşov Romania F9	Futures	Clay	(Moldova) Radu Albot	(Romania) Teodor-Dacian Crăciun (Romania) Adrian Cruciat	0–6, 6–3, [7–10]
Win	8–14	Nov 2011	Antalya Turkey F31	Futures	Hard	(Moldova) Maxim Dubarenco	(Russia) Alexander Lobkov (Uzbekistan) Vaja Uzakov	7–5, 6–4
Loss	8–15	Feb 2012	Antalya Turkey F6	Futures	Hard	(Moldova) Radu Albot	(Belgium) Germain Gigounon (Belgium) Yannik Reuter	6–7^{(6–8)}, 4–6
Loss	8–16	Feb 2012	Antalya Turkey F7	Futures	Hard	(Moldova) Radu Albot	(Belgium) Joris De Loore (Belgium) Yannik Reuter	3–6, 6–7^{(6–8)}
Win	9–16	Mar 2012	Antalya Turkey F11	Futures	Clay	(Ukraine) Ivan Sergeyev	(Sweden) Patrik Brydolf (France) Florian Reynet	6–3, 7–6^{(7–5)}
Win	10–16	Jul 2012	Yerevan Armenia F1	Futures	Clay	(Ukraine) Oleksandr Nedovyesov	(Germany) Patrick Elias (Ukraine) Vladyslav Manafov	6–3, 6–1
Win	11–16	Jul 2012	Yerevan Armenia F2	Futures	Clay	(Ukraine) Oleksandr Nedovyesov	(Germany) Patrick Elias (Ukraine) Vladyslav Manafov	6–4, 6–2
Win	12–16	Aug 2012	Mediaș Romania F8	Futures	Clay	(Moldova) Maxim Dubarenco	(Romania) Alexandru-Daniel Carpen (Chile) Cristóbal Saavedra Corvalán	7–6^{(7–5)}, 6–4
Loss	12–17	Sep 2012	Braşov, Romania	Challenger	Clay	(Ukraine) Oleksandr Nedovyesov	(Romania) Marius Copil (Romania) Victor Crivoi	7–6^{(10–8)}, 4–6, [12–14]
Loss	12–18	Oct 2012	Adana Turkey F40	Futures	Hard	(Egypt) Mohamed Safwat	(United Kingdom) Jack Carpenter (United Kingdom) George Morgan	3–6, 4–6
Loss	12–19	Dec 2012	Belek Turkey F47	Futures	Hard	(Ukraine) Volodymyr Uzhylovskyi	(Bosnia and Herzegovina) Tomislav Brkić (Croatia) Dino Marcan	1–6, 6–7^{(5–7)}
Win	13–19	Dec 2012	Belek Turkey F48	Futures	Hard	(Ukraine) Volodymyr Uzhylovskyi	(Italy) Lorenzo Giustino (Spain) Guillermo Olaso	6–2, 4–6, [10–7]
Loss	13–20	Apr 2013	Antalya Turkey F14	Futures	Hard	(Switzerland) Luca Margaroli	(Argentina) Maximiliano Estévez (Dominican Republic) José Hernández-Fernández	2–6, 1–6
Win	14–20	May 2013	Shymkent Kazakhstan F3	Futures	Clay	(Russia) Kirill Dmitriev	(Russia) Alexander Igoshin (Russia) Vitaliy Kachanovskiy	7–6^{(7–5)}, 6–4
Win	15–20	May 2013	Shymkent Kazakhstan F4	Futures	Clay	(Russia) Kirill Dmitriev	(Russia) Alexander Igoshin (Russia) Vitaliy Kachanovskiy	3–6, 6–2, [10–3]
Win	16–20	May 2013	Shymkent Kazakhstan F5	Futures	Clay	(Russia) Kirill Dmitriev	(Belarus) Pavel Filin (Belarus) Vladzimir Kruk	7–5, 4–6, [10–6]
Loss	16–21	Aug 2013	Minsk Belarus F2	Futures	Hard	(Ukraine) Volodymyr Uzhylovskyi	(Republic of Ireland) James Cluskey (France) Fabrice Martin	3–6, 4–6
Loss	16–22	Sep 2013	Antalya Turkey F38	Futures	Hard	(Moldova) Ilie Babinciuc	(France) Rémi Boutillier (Madagascar) Antso Rakotondramanga	2–6, 4–6
Loss	16–23	Oct 2013	Antalya Turkey F39	Futures	Hard	(Russia) Kirill Dmitriev	(United States) Adam El Mihdawy (Kazakhstan) Denis Yevseyev	5–7, 3–6
Win	17–23	Nov 2013	Antalya Turkey F43	Futures	Hard	(Ukraine) Artem Smirnov	(Denmark) Anders Holm (Denmark) Mohamed Shabib	6–3, 7–6^{(7–0)}
Loss	17–24	May 2014	Antalya Turkey F39	Futures	Hard	(India) Ramkumar Ramanathan	(Japan) Sho Katayama (Japan) Bumpei Sato	3–6, 1–6
Win	18–24	May 2014	Galați Romania F1	Futures	Clay	(Moldova) Maxim Dubarenco	(Romania) Vasile Antonescu (Romania) Alexandru-Daniel Carpen	6–2, 7–6^{(7–4)}
Win	19–24	Jun 2014	Sibiu Romania F5	Futures	Clay	(Romania) Petru-Alexandru Luncanu	(Argentina) Gaston-Arturo Grimolizzi (Lithuania) Lukas Mugevičius	6–2, 6–3
