= Aleksandr Nedovyesov =

Kazakhstani tennis player

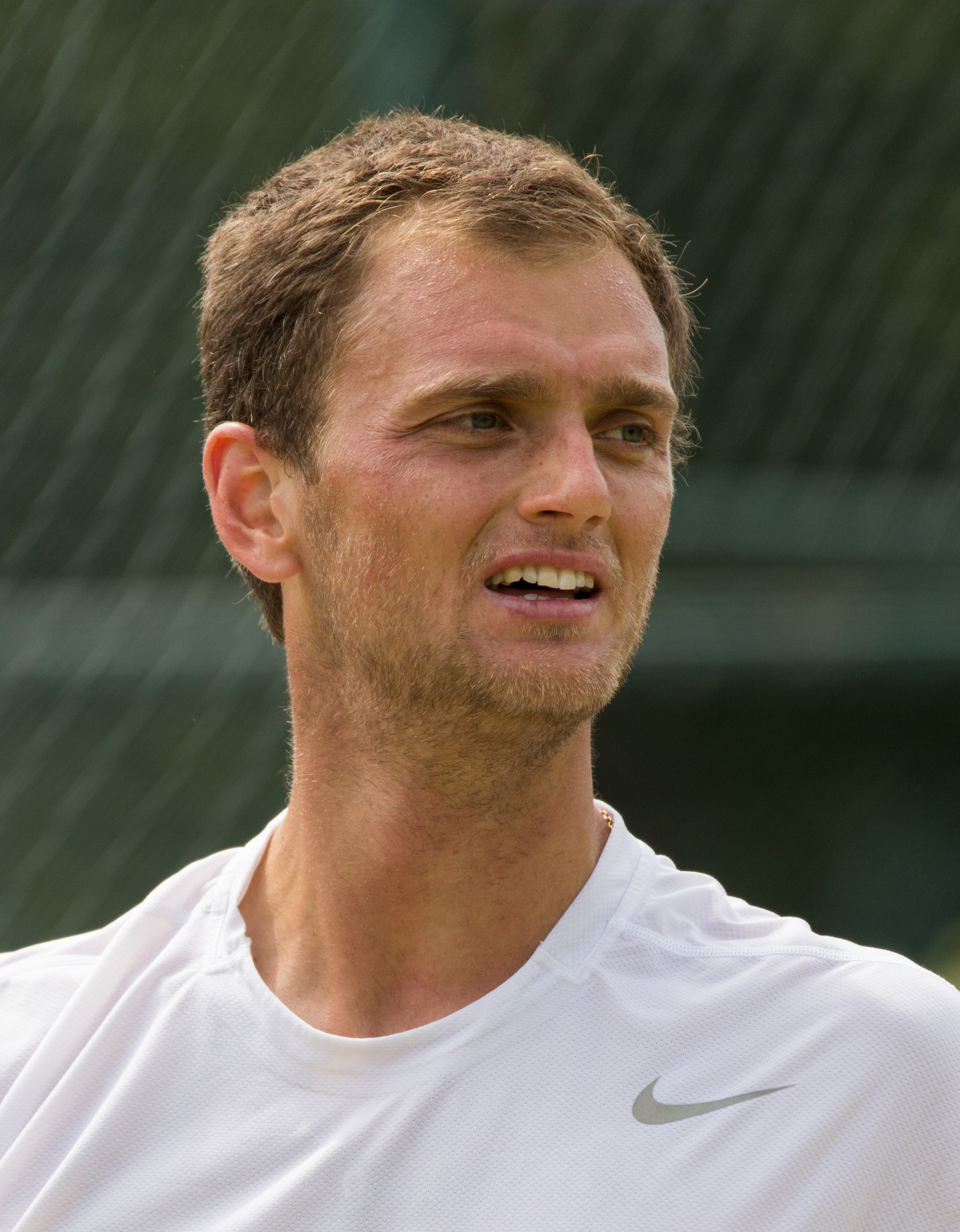
- Nedovyesov at the 2015 Wimbledon Championships
- Native name: Олександр Сергійович Недовєсов
- Country (sports): Ukraine (2004–2013); Kazakhstan (2014–present)
- Born: 15 February 1987 (age 39) Alushta, Ukrainian SSR, Soviet Union
- Height: 1.88 m (6 ft 2 in)
- Turned pro: 2005
- Plays: Right-handed (two-handed backhand)
- College: Oklahoma State
- Coach: Numrid Muhatasov, Lovro Zovko
- Prize money: US $1,629,093

Singles
- Career record: 6–26 (ATP Tour and Grand Slam main draws, and in Davis Cup)
- Career titles: 0
- Highest ranking: No. 72 (21 April 2014)

Grand Slam singles results
- Australian Open: 1R (2014)
- French Open: 2R (2014)
- Wimbledon: 1R (2014, 2015)
- US Open: 2R (2014)

Doubles
- Career record: 97–103 (ATP Tour and Grand Slam main draws, and in Davis Cup)
- Career titles: 3
- Highest ranking: No. 38 (20 May 2024)

Grand Slam doubles results
- Australian Open: 2R (2022, 2023)
- French Open: 3R (2023)
- Wimbledon: 2R (2014, 2022)
- US Open: 2R (2022)

Other doubles tournaments
- Olympic Games: 1R (2024)

Grand Slam mixed doubles results
- Australian Open: 1R (2023)

Team competitions
- Davis Cup: QF (2014, 2015, 2021)
Medal record
Men's tennis
Representing Kazakhstan
Asian Games
Gold medal – first place	2014 Incheon	Team Event

Aleksandr Nedovyesov (Russian: Алекса́ндр Серге́евич Недове́сов; Russian pronunciation: [ɐlʲɪˈksandr nʲɪdɐˈvʲesəf]; formerly known as Oleksandr Nedovyesov and Alexander Nedovesov; born 15 February 1987), is a Ukrainian-Kazakhstani professional tennis player. He won his maiden title at the 2023 Swedish Open in Bastad, becoming the first Kazakhstani in the Open Era to lift a doubles ATP title. He reached his highest ATP doubles ranking of No. 38 on 20 May 2024 and a singles ranking of No. 72 on 21 April 2014. Nedovyesov also competed for Kazakhstan at the 2024 Summer Olympics.

Nedovyesov has won a total of three ATP doubles titles with Gonzalo Escobar. He has also reached six doubles ATP finals two in 2022, three in 2023, and one in 2024. He represented Ukraine until December 2013. He has also reached 17 career singles finals, posting a record of 9 wins and 8 losses which includes 3 ATP Challenger Tour titles. Additionally, he has reached 61 doubles finals, posting a record of 38 wins and 23 losses which includes 25 ATP Challenger Tour titles.

== Career ==
=== 2004–2005: Junior No. 33 ===
As a junior, Nedovyesov had a singles win–loss record of 29–16. His best showing at a junior grand slam tournament in singles was reaching the second round in both the 2004 French Open and 2004 Wimbledon Championships. His best showing in doubles was at the 2004 Wimbledon Championships where he reached the quarterfinals alongside Nikita Kryvonos. He reached a career high of world No. 33 in the ITF Juniors rankings on 10 January 2005.

=== 2013–2015: Grand Slam singles and doubles debut, Career high singles ranking ===
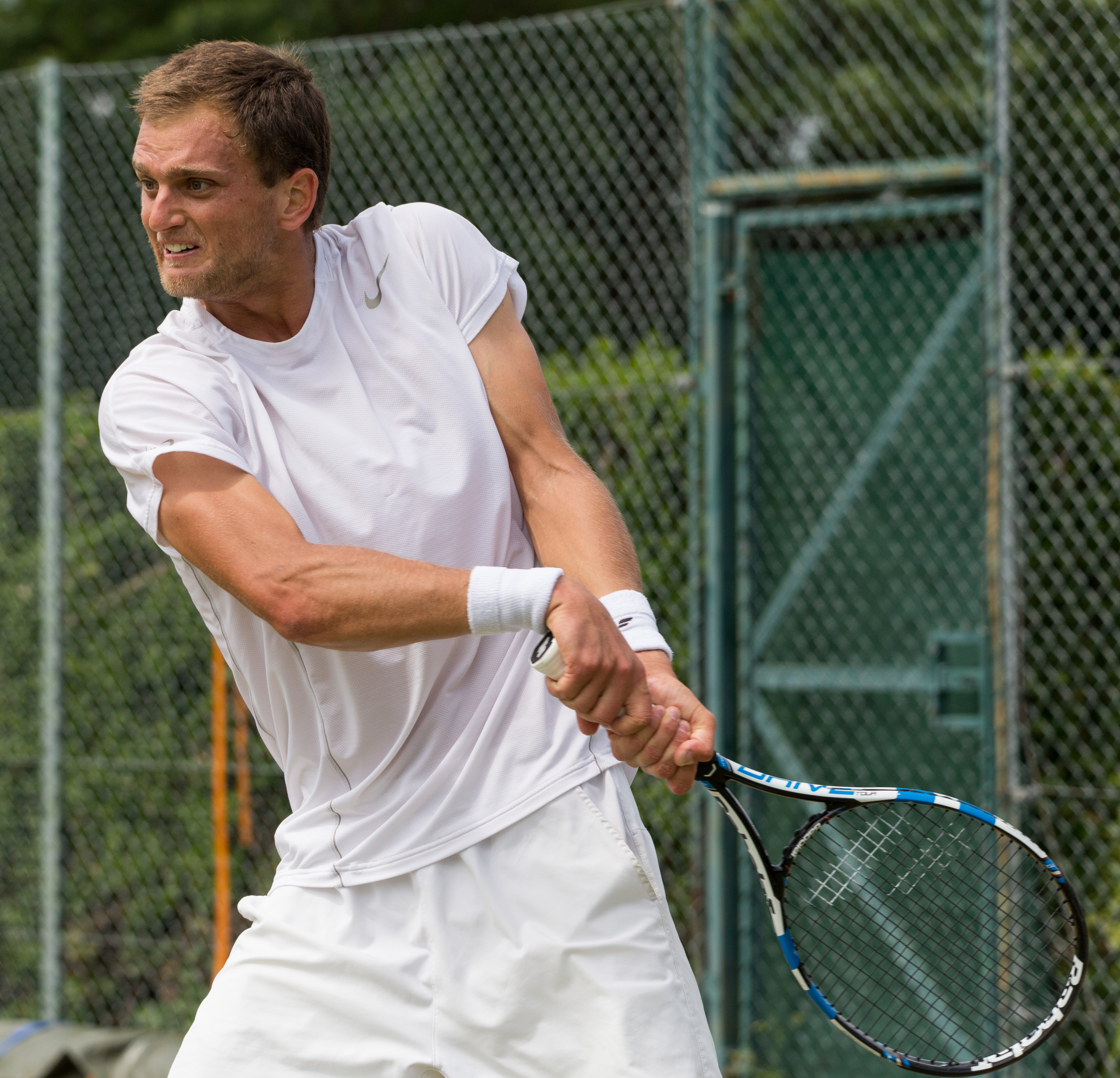
Aleksandr Nedovyesov 2, 2015 Wimbledon Qualifying

He made his first appearance in the main draw of a Major at the 2014 Australian Open, where he lost to Tomáš Berdych in straight sets. He reached a career-high ranking of No. 72 in April 2014.

At the 2014 French Open, he recorded his first victory at a Grand Slam event with victory over Somdev Devvarman, he again met Berdych in the second round, this time winning a set before losing in four.

Nedovyesov made his Grand Slam doubles debut at the 2014 Wimbledon Championships where he partnered up with Russian player Dmitry Tursunov. In the first round they defeated Benoît Paire and Tomasz Bednarek 6–7^{(4–7)}, 7–6^{(7–3)}, 7–6^{(7–2)}, 6–2. In the second round, they faced sixth seeds Julian Knowle and Marcelo Melo and were defeated in straight sets 1–6, 6–7^{(9–11)}, 3–6.

=== 2021–2023: Historic Maiden ATP title, Eight Challenger titles & five ATP finals, top 50 ===
During the 2021 season, he won seven Challenger doubles titles, four of them with Ukrainian Denys Molchanov.

He reached an ATP final at the 2022 Melbourne Summer Set 1 for the first time in his career partnering Aisam-ul-Haq Qureshi.

At the 2022 Australian Open he again partnered with Qureshi to win his first doubles match at this Major and only his second Grand Slam win in doubles in his career where they defeated seventh seeded pair of Nicolas Mahut and Fabrice Martin. At the 2022 Delray Beach Open he reached his second ATP final with Qureshi.

He reached his fourth ATP final at the 2023 Libéma Open with Gonzalo Escobar, losing to Wesley Koolhof and Neal Skupski. He won his maiden title at the 2023 Swedish Open in Bastad with Escobar, becoming the first Kazakhstani in the Open Era to lift a doubles ATP title. He won his second title at the 2023 Sofia Open with Escobar.

== ATP career finals ==
=== Doubles: 10 (3 titles, 7 runner-ups) ===
Legend Grand Slam tournaments (0–0) ATP World Tour Finals (0–0) ATP World Tour Masters 1000 (0–0) ATP World Tour 500 Series (0–0) ATP World Tour 250 Series (3–7)	Finals by surface Hard (1–4) Clay (2–2) Grass (0–1)	Finals by setting Outdoor (2–6) Indoor (1–1)

Result	W–L	Date	Tournament	Tier	Surface	Partner	Opponents	Score
Loss	0–1	Jan 2022	Melbourne Summer Set 1, Australia	250 Series	Hard	(Pakistan) Aisam-ul-Haq Qureshi	(Netherlands) Wesley Koolhof (United Kingdom) Neal Skupski	4–6, 4–6
Loss	0–2	Feb 2022	Delray Beach Open, United States	250 Series	Hard	(Pakistan) Aisam-ul-Haq Qureshi	(El Salvador) Marcelo Arévalo (Netherlands) Jean-Julien Rojer	2–6, 7–6 ^{(7–5)}, [4–10]
Loss	0–3	Apr 2023	Banja Luka Open, Bosnia and Herzegovina	250 Series	Clay	(Portugal) Francisco Cabral	(United Kingdom) Jamie Murray (New Zealand) Michael Venus	5–7, 2–6
Loss	0–4	Jun 2023	Rosmalen Championships, Netherlands	250 Series	Grass	(Ecuador) Gonzalo Escobar	(Netherlands) Wesley Koolhof (United Kingdom) Neal Skupski	6–7^{(1–7)}, 2–6
Win	1–4	Jul 2023	Swedish Open, Sweden	250 Series	Clay	(Ecuador) Gonzalo Escobar	(Portugal) Francisco Cabral (Brazil) Rafael Matos	6–2, 6–2
Loss	1–5	Aug 2023	Austrian Open Kitzbühel, Austria	250 Series	Clay	(Ecuador) Gonzalo Escobar	(Austria) Alexander Erler (Austria) Lucas Miedler	4–6, 4–6
Win	2–5	Nov 2023	Sofia Open, Bulgaria	250 Series	Hard (i)	(Ecuador) Gonzalo Escobar	(United Kingdom) Julian Cash (Croatia) Nikola Mektić	6–3, 3–6, [13–11]
Loss	2–6	Feb 2024	Los Cabos Open, Mexico	250 Series	Hard	(Ecuador) Gonzalo Escobar	(Australia) Max Purcell (Australia) Jordan Thompson	5–7, 6–7^{(2–7)}
Win	3–6	Apr 2024	Estoril Open, Portugal	250 Series	Clay	(Ecuador) Gonzalo Escobar	(France) Sadio Doumbia (France) Fabien Reboul	7–5, 6–2
Loss	3–7	Oct 2024	European Open, Belgium	250 Series	Hard (i)	(United States) Robert Galloway	(Austria) Alexander Erler (Austria) Lucas Miedler	4–6, 6–1, [8–10]

== ATP Challenger and ITF Futures finals ==
=== Singles: 17 (9–8) ===
Legend ATP Challenger (3–5) ITF Futures (6–3)	Finals by surface Hard (4–5) Clay (5–3) Grass (0–0) Carpet (0–0)

Result	W–L	Date	Tournament	Tier	Surface	Opponent	Score
Loss	0–1	Dec 2005	Israel F2, Ramat HaSharon	Futures	Hard	(North Macedonia) Lazar Magdinchev	6–7^{(3–7)}, 6–7^{(2–7)}
Win	1–1	Aug 2006	Romania F15, Craiova	Futures	Clay	(France) Jordane Doble	0–6, 6–3, 6–2
Win	2–1	Jun 2010	Serbia F1, Belgrade	Futures	Clay	(Serbia) Dušan Lajović	6–4, 6–2
Loss	2–2	Aug 2010	Belarus F2, Minsk	Futures	Clay	(Spain) Guillermo Olaso	2–6, 2–6
Win	3–2	Mar 2012	Ukraine F3, Cherkassy	Futures	Hard	(Italy) Viktor Galović	6–2, 6–3
Win	4–2	Apr 2012	Turkey F13, Antalya	Futures	Hard	(Slovakia) Adrian Sikora	6–4, 6–7^{(6–8)}, 6–3
Win	5–2	Jun 2012	Turkey F22, Konya	Futures	Hard	(Ukraine) Ivan Sergeyev	6–2, 7-6^{(7–2)}
Win	6–2	Jul 2012	Armenia F2, Yerevan	Futures	Clay	(Russia) Stanislav Vovk	4–6, 6–4, 7–5
Loss	6–3	Mar 2013	Ukraine F3, Cherkassy	Futures	Hard	(Ukraine) Artem Smirnov	6–7^{(2–7)}, 6–2, 6-7^{(3–7)}
Loss	6–4	May 2013	Samarkand, Uzbekistan	Challenger	Clay	(Russia) Teymuraz Gabashvili	3–6, 4–6
Win	7–4	Jun 2013	Prague, Uzbekistan	Challenger	Clay	(Spain) Javier Martí	6–0, 6–1
Win	8–4	Sep 2013	Szczecin, Poland	Challenger	Clay	(Spain) Pere Riba	6–2, 7–5
Win	9–4	Oct 2013	Kazan, Russia	Challenger	Hard	(Kazakhstan) Andrey Golubev	6–4, 6–1
Loss	9–5	Feb 2014	New Delhi, India	Challenger	Hard	(India) Somdev Devvarman	3–6, 1–6
Loss	9–6	Oct 2014	New Indore, India	Challenger	Hard	(India) Saketh Myneni	3–6, 7–6^{(7–4)}, 3–6
Loss	9–7	Feb 2015	Bergamo, Italy	Challenger	Hard	(France) Benoît Paire	3–6, 6–7^{(3–7)}
Loss	9–8	Jul 2018	Prague, Czech Republic	Challenger	Clay	(Czech Republic) Lukáš Rosol	6–4, 3–6, 4–6

=== Doubles: 61 (38–23) ===
Legend ATP Challenger (25–12) ITF Futures (13–11)	Finals by surface Hard (15–8) Clay (22–14) Grass (1–1) Carpet (0–0)

Result	W–L	Date	Tournament	Tier	Surface	Partner	Opponents	Score
Loss	0–1	Jul 2005	Romania F10, Foscani	Futures	Clay	(Ukraine) Nikolai Dyachok	(Chile) Jorge Aguilar (Brazil) Caio Zampieri	4–6, 0–6
Loss	0–2	Jul 2005	Romania F13, Târgu Mureș	Futures	Clay	(Ukraine) Nikolai Dyachok	(Chile) Jorge Aguilar (Chile) Felipe Parada	1–6, 2–6
Loss	0–3	Oct 2005	Ukraine F3, Illyichovsk	Futures	Clay	(Ukraine) Nikolai Dyachok	(Ukraine) Sergey Bubka (Ukraine) Mikhail Filima	1–6, 3–6
Loss	0–4	Dec 2005	Israel F2, Ramat HaSharon	Futures	Hard	(Latvia) Deniss Pavlovs	(Israel) Dudi Sela (Israel) Victor Kolik	3–6, 3–6
Loss	0–5	May 2006	Uzbekistan F3, Namangan	Futures	Hard	(Russia) Mikhail Kukushkin	(France) Jean-François Bachelot (France) Nicolas Tourte	5–7, 3–6
Loss	0–6	Jun 2006	Ukraine F3, Cherkassy	Futures	Clay	(Ukraine) Sergey Bubka	(Russia) A. Krasnorutskiy (Russia) A. Kudryavstev	3–6, 6–4, 2–6
Win	1–6	Jun 2006	Ukraine F4, Gorlovka	Futures	Clay	(Russia) Mikhail Elgin	(Ukraine) Ernest Zurabian (Moldova) Andrei Gorban	7–6^{(7–4)}, 6–2
Loss	1–7	Jul 2006	Romania F13, Hunedoara	Futures	Clay	(Ukraine) Vladislav Bondarenko	(Romania) Cosmin Cotet (Romania) Marcel-Ioan Miron	3–6, 6–2, 3–6
Win	2–7	Aug 2006	Romania F15, Craiova	Futures	Clay	(Moldova) Denys Molchanov	(Romania) Cătălin-Ionuț Gârd (Romania) Marcel-Ioan Miron	6–4, 6–1
Win	3–7	Aug 2006	Romania F16, Arad	Futures	Clay	(Moldova) Denys Molchanov	(Romania) Adrian Cruciat (Romania) Marcel-Ioan Miron	6–4, 6–2
Win	4–7	Sep 2006	Donetsk, Ukraine	Challenger	Hard	(Ukraine) Aleksandr Yarmola	(Ukraine) Aleksandr Aksyonov (Ukraine) Vladyslav Klymenko	6–4, 6–2
Loss	4–8	Oct 2006	USA F26, Mansfield	Futures	Hard	(Austria) Armin Sandbichler	(United States) Jason Marshall (United States) Ryan Deheart	3–6, 5–7
Loss	4–9	Oct 2006	USA F27, Baton Rouge	Futures	Hard	(Austria) Armin Sandbichler	(South Africa) Fritz Wolmarans (Serbia and Montenegro) Aleksandar Vlaski	5–7, 2–6
Win	5–9	Jun 2007	Ukraine F3, Cherkassy	Futures	Clay	(Latvia) Deniss Pavlovs	(Ukraine) Aleksandr Yarmola (Ukraine) Aleksandr Agafonov	6–3, 6–4
Loss	5–10	Jun 2007	Belarus F4, Minsk	Futures	Clay	(Latvia) Deniss Pavlovs	(Russia) Mikhail Elgin (Russia) A. Krasnorutskiy	3–6, 4–6
Win	6–10	Jun 2010	Serbia F1, Belgrade	Futures	Clay	(Ukraine) Vadim Alekseenko	(North Macedonia) Predrag Rusevski (Serbia) Aleksander Slovic	7–6^{(7–5)}, 6–3
Win	7–10	Jun 2010	Serbia F2, Belgrade	Futures	Clay	(Ukraine) Vadim Alekseenko	(Serbia) Vladimir Obradović (Serbia) Arsenije Zlatanovic	6–1, 6–3
Loss	7–11	Feb 2012	Ukraine F1, Cherkassy	Futures	Hard	(Ukraine) Stanislav Poplavskyy	(Poland) Andriej Kapaś (Poland) Adam Chadaj	6–4, 6–7^{(3–7)}, [2–10]
Win	8–11	May 2012	Bulgaria F1, Varna	Futures	Clay	(Ukraine) Ivan Sergeyev	(Bulgaria) Dimitar Kuzmanov (Bulgaria) Valentin Dimov	6–1, 6–1
Win	9–11	Jun 2012	Turkey F21, Mersin	Futures	Clay	(Ukraine) Ivan Sergeyev	(Australia) Maverick Banes (Australia) Brydan Klein	3–6, 6–1, [10–7]
Win	10–11	Jun 2012	Turkey F22, Konya	Futures	Hard	(Ukraine) Ivan Sergeyev	(Republic of Ireland) Daniel Glancy (United States) W. Boe-Wiegaard	7–6^{(7–5)}, 6–1
Win	11–11	Jun 2012	Russia F8, Kazan	Futures	Clay	(Ukraine) Ivan Sergeyev	(Russia) A. Rumyantsev (Russia) Aleksandr Lobkov	6–2, 6–4
Win	12–11	Jul 2012	Armenia F1, Yerevan	Futures	Clay	(Moldova) Andrei Ciumac	(Germany) Patrick Elias (Ukraine) Vladyslav Manafov	6–3, 6–1
Win	13–11	Jul 2012	Armenia F2, Yerevan	Futures	Clay	(Moldova) Andrei Ciumac	(Germany) Patrick Elias (Ukraine) Vladyslav Manafov	6–4, 6–2
Win	14–11	Aug 2012	Samarkand, Uzbekistan	Challenger	Clay	(Ukraine) Ivan Sergeyev	(India) Divij Sharan (India) Vishnu Vardhan	6–4, 7–6^{(7–1)}
Loss	14–12	Sep 2012	Brașov, Romania	Challenger	Clay	(Moldova) Andrei Ciumac	(Romania) Marius Copil (Romania) Victor Crivoi	7–6^{(10–8)}, 4–6, [10–12]
Loss	14–13	Apr 2013	Mersin, Turkey	Challenger	Clay	(Moldova) Radu Albot	(Germany) Andreas Beck (Germany) Dominik Meffert	7–5, 3–6, [8–10]
Win	15–13	May 2013	Samarkand, Uzbekistan	Challenger	Clay	(Uzbekistan) Farrukh Dustov	(Moldova) Radu Albot (Australia) Jordan Kerr	6–1, 7–6^{(9–7)}
Win	16–13	Sep 2013	Brașov, Romania	Challenger	Clay	(Czech Republic) Jaroslav Pospíšil	(Romania) T-D Craciun (Romania) P-A Luncanu	6–3, 6–1
Loss	16–14	Sep 2013	Banja Luka, Bosnia & Herzegovina	Challenger	Clay	(Germany) Dominik Meffert	(Croatia) Marin Draganja (Croatia) Nikola Mektić	4–6, 6–3, [6–10]
Win	17–14	Oct 2014	Indore, India	Challenger	Hard	(Spain) Adrián Menéndez Maceiras	(India) Yuki Bhambri (India) Divij Sharan	2–6, 6–4, [10–3]
Win	18–14	Jan 2015	Happy Valley, Australia	Challenger	Hard	(Russia) Andrey Kuznetsov	(Australia) Alex Bolt (Australia) Andrew Whittington	7–5, 6–4
Loss	18–15	Feb 2015	Glasgow, United Kingdom	Challenger	Hard	(Ukraine) Sergey Bubka	(Netherlands) Wesley Koolhof (Netherlands) Matwé Middelkoop	1–6, 4–6
Win	19–15	Mar 2015	Guangzhou, China	Challenger	Hard	(Spain) Daniel Muñoz de la Nava	(France) Fabrice Martin (India) Purav Raja	6–2, 7–5
Win	20–15	Sep 2015	Istanbul, Turkey	Challenger	Hard	(Russia) Andrey Kuznetsov	(Georgia (country)) Aleksandre Metreveli (Russia) Anton Zaitcev	6–2, 5–7, [10–8]
Loss	20–16	Jan 2016	Happy Valley, Australia	Challenger	Hard	(Ukraine) Denys Molchanov	(Italy) Matteo Donati (Kazakhstan) Andrey Golubev	6–3, 6–7^{(5–7)}, [1–10]
Loss	20–17	Apr 2016	Nanjing, China	Challenger	Clay	(Ukraine) Denys Molchanov	(India) Saketh Myneni (India) Jeevan Nedunchezhiyan	3–6, 3–6
Loss	20–18	May 2016	Anning, China	Challenger	Clay	(Ukraine) Denys Molchanov	(China) Bai Yan (Italy) Riccardo Ghedin	6–4, 3–6, [6–10]
Win	21–18	Nov 2016	Astana, Kazakhstan	Challenger	Hard	(Kazakhstan) Timur Khabibulin	(Russia) Mikhail Elgin (Uzbekistan) Denis Istomin	7–6^{(9–7)}, 6–2
Win	22–18	Oct 2017	Almaty, Kazakhstan	Challenger	Clay	(Kazakhstan) Timur Khabibulin	(Russia) Ivan Gakhov (Croatia) Nino Serdarušić	1–6, 6–3, [10–3]
Win	23–18	Feb 2018	Kazakhstan F1, Aktobe	Futures	Hard	(Kazakhstan) Timur Khabibulin	(Russia) A. Pavlioutchenkov (Russia) Vladimir Polyakov	6–2, ret.
Win	24–18	Jul 2019	Nur Sultan, Kazakhstan	Challenger	Hard	(Kazakhstan) Andrey Golubev	(South Korea) Chung Yun-seong (South Korea) Nam Ji-sung	6–4, 6–4
Loss	24–19	Jul 2019	Prague, Czech Republic	Challenger	Clay	(Kazakhstan) Andrey Golubev	(Uruguay) Ariel Behar (Ecuador) Gonzalo Escobar	7–6^{(7–4)}, 5–7, [8–10]
Win	25–19	Sep 2019	Istanbul, Turkey	Challenger	Hard	(Kazakhstan) Andrey Golubev	(Czech Republic) Marek Gengel (Czech Republic) Lukáš Rosol	walkover
Win	26–19	Jan 2020	Bangkok, Thailand	Challenger	Hard	(Kazakhstan) Andrey Golubev	(Thailand) Sanchai Ratiwatana (Indonesia) Christopher Rungkat	3–6, 7–6^{(7–1)}, [10–5]
Win	27–19	Feb 2020	Quimper, France	Challenger	Hard	(Kazakhstan) Andrey Golubev	(Croatia) Ivan Sabanov (Croatia) Matej Sabanov	6-4, 6–2
Win	28–19	Nov 2020	Orlando, United States	Challenger	Hard	(Kazakhstan) Andrey Golubev	(United States) Mitchell Krueger (United States) Jackson Withrow	7-5, 6–4
Win	29–19	Jan 2021	Antalya, Turkey	Challenger	Clay	(Ukraine) Denys Molchanov	(Venezuela) Luis David Martínez (Spain) D. Vega Hernández	3–6, 6–4, [18–16]
Win	30–19	Feb 2021	Antalya, Turkey	Challenger	Clay	(Ukraine) Denys Molchanov	(United States) Alex Lawson (United States) Robert Galloway	6–4, 7–6^{(7–2)}
Win	31–19	Feb 2021	Nur-Sultan, Kazakhstan	Challenger	Hard	(Ukraine) Denys Molchanov	(United States) Max Schnur (United States) Nathan Pasha	6-4, 6–4
Win	32–19	Apr 2021	Split, Croatia	Challenger	Clay	(Kazakhstan) Andrey Golubev	(Poland) Szymon Walków (Poland) Jan Zieliński	7–5, 6–7^{(5–7)}, [10–5]
Loss	32–20	May 2021	Zagreb, Croatia	Challenger	Clay	(Kazakhstan) Andrey Golubev	(United States) Evan King (United States) Hunter Reese	2-6, 6-7^{(4–7)}
Win	33–20	June 2021	Bratislava, Slovakia	Challenger	Clay	(Ukraine) Denys Molchanov	(Netherlands) Sander Arends (Venezuela) Luis David Martínez	7–6^{(7–5)}, 6–1
Win	34–20	June 2021	Prostějov, Czech Republic	Challenger	Clay	(Portugal) Gonçalo Oliveira	(Czech Republic) Roman Jebavý (Czech Republic) Zdeněk Kolář	1–6, 7–6^{(7–5)}, [10–6]
Loss	34-21	Aug 2021	Lüdenscheid, Germany	Challenger	Clay	(Ukraine) Denys Molchanov	(Croatia) Ivan Sabanov (Croatia) Matej Sabanov	4–6, 6–2, [10–12]
Win	35–21	Sep 2021	Kyiv, Ukraine	Challenger	Clay	(Brazil) Orlando Luz	(Ukraine) Denys Molchanov (Ukraine) Sergiy Stakhovsky	6-4, 6–4
Loss	35-22	Nov 2021	Bratislava, Slovakia	Challenger	Hard (i)	(Ukraine) Denys Molchanov	(Slovakia) Filip Horanský (Ukraine) Sergiy Stakhovsky	4-6, 4–6
Loss	35-23	May 2022	Surbiton, UK	Challenger	Grass	(Pakistan) Aisam-ul-Haq Qureshi	(United Kingdom) Julian Cash (United Kingdom) Henry Patten	6–4, 3–6, [9–11]
Win	36-23	Nov 2022	Bratislava, Slovakia	Challenger	Hard (i)	(Ukraine) Denys Molchanov	(Czech Republic) Petr Nouza (Czech Republic) Andrew Paulson	4–6, 6–4, [10–6]
Win	37-23	June 2023	Ilkley, UK	Challenger	Grass	(Ecuador) Gonzalo Escobar	(United States) Robert Galloway (Australia) John-Patrick Smith	2–6, 7–5, [11–9]
Win	38-23	Mar 2024	Girona, Spain	Challenger	Clay	(Ecuador) Gonzalo Escobar	(France) Jonathan Eysseric (France) Albano Olivetti	7–6^{(7–1)}, 6–4
