= Teodor-Dacian Crăciun =

Romanian tennis player

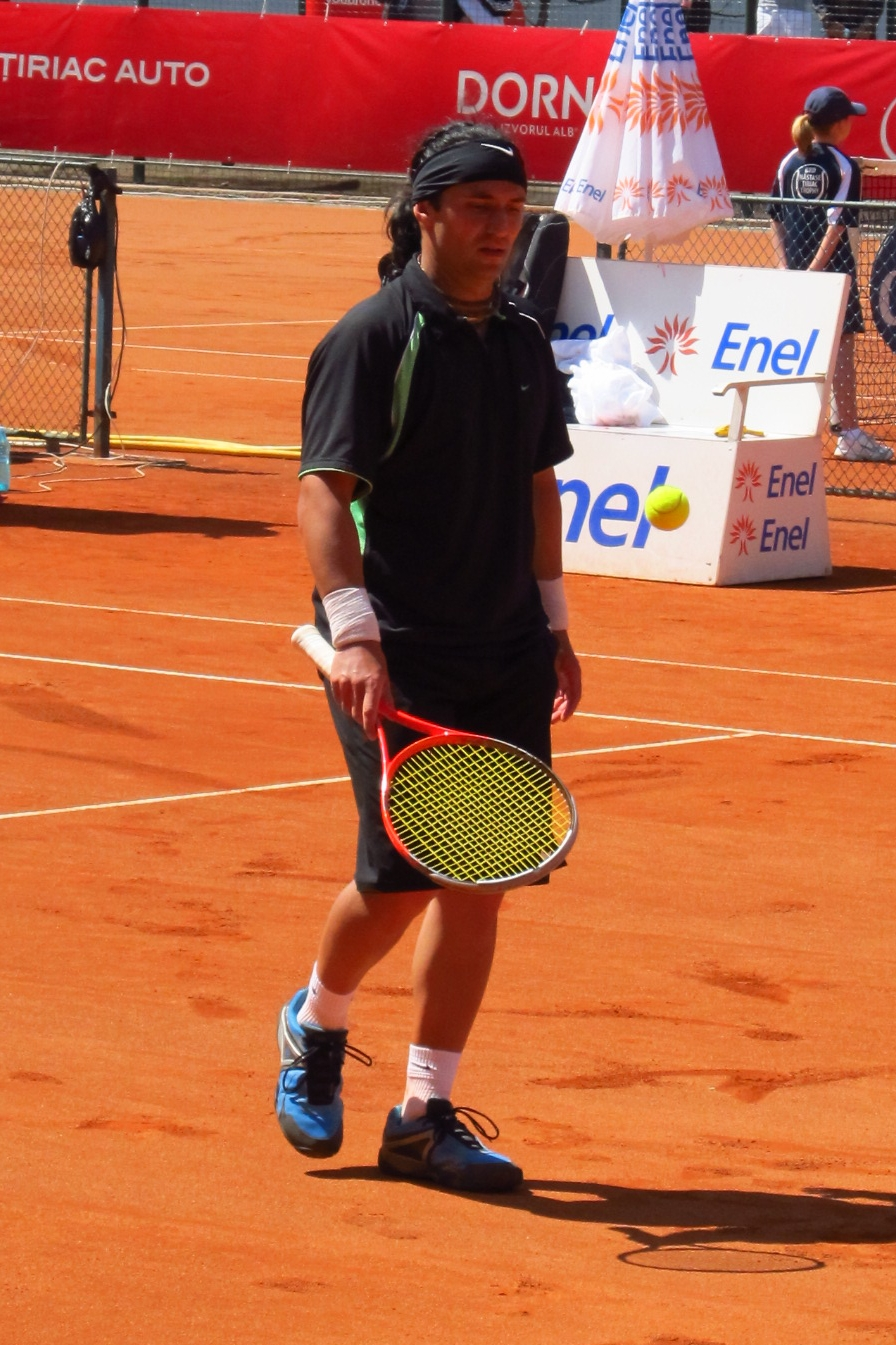
- Teodor-Dacian Crăciun at the 2012 BRD Năstase Țiriac Trophy
- Country (sports): Romania
- Born: 6 June 1980 (age 45); Socialist Republic of Romania
- Height: 1.70 m (5 ft 7 in)
- Turned pro: 1998
- Plays: Right-handed (one-handed and two-handed backhand)
- Prize money: $135,975

Singles
- Career record: 0–0 (ATP Tour and Grand Slam main draws, and in Davis Cup)
- Career titles: 0
- Highest ranking: No. 218 (5 March 2007)
- Current ranking: NR

Grand Slam singles results
- Australian Open: Q1 (2007)
- French Open: Q2 (2007)

Doubles
- Career record: 0–0 (ATP Tour and Grand Slam main draws, and in Davis Cup)
- Career titles: 0
- Highest ranking: No. 200 (9 July 2007)
- Current ranking: NR
- Last updated on: 6 February 2025.

Teodor-Dacian Crăciun (born 6 June 1980) is a Romanian tennis player. He reached his highest ATP singles ranking of World No. 218 in March 2007.

Crăciun plays with both one-handed and two-handed backhands depending on the shot. He usually rallies with two hands and hits angles/passing shots with one hand.

Crăciun has been inactive since 2023, and he has won 1 ATP Challenger doubles title.

== ATP Challenger Tour finals ==
=== Singles finals: 1 (0–1) ===
Legend ATP Challenger Tour (0–1)	Titles by surface Hard (0–0) Grass (0–0) Clay (0–1) Carpet (0–0)

Result	No.	Date	Tournament	Surface	Opponent	Score
Loss	1.	1 October 2006	Bratislava, Slovakia	Clay	(Spain) Iván Navarro	2–6, 6–7^{(4–7)}

=== Doubles finals: 4 (1–3) ===
Legend ATP Challenger Tour (1–3)	Titles by surface Hard (0–0) Grass (0–0) Clay (1–3) Carpet (0–0)

Result	No.	Date	Tournament	Surface	Partner	Opponents	Score
Loss	1.	15 July 2006	Oberstaufen, Germany	Clay	(Romania) Gabriel Moraru	(Latvia) Ernests Gulbis (Germany) Mischa Zverev	1–6, 1–6
Loss	2.	15 April 2007	Chiasso, Switzerland	Clay	(Romania) Victor Crivoi	(Netherlands) Bart Beks (Netherlands) Matwé Middelkoop	6–7^{(2–7)}, 5–7
Win	3.	30 June 2007	Almaty 2, Kazakhstan	Clay	(Romania) Florin Mergea	(Kazakhstan) Alexey Kedryuk (Russia) Alexandre Kudryavtsev	6–2, 6–1
Loss	4.	8 September 2013	Brașov, Romania	Clay	(Romania) Petru-Alexandru Luncanu	(Ukraine) Aleksandr Nedovyesov (Czech Republic) Jaroslav Pospíšil	3–6, 1–6
