= Victor Ioniță =

Romanian tennis player (born 1983)

- Country (sports): Romania
- Residence: Braşov, Romania
- Born: 11 May 1983 (age 41); Bucharest, Romania
- Height: 1.85 m (6 ft 1 in)
- Turned pro: 2000
- Plays: Right-handed
- Prize money: US$141,950

Singles
- Career record: 1–3
- Career titles: 0
- Highest ranking: No. 187 (May 23, 2005)

Doubles
- Career record: 0–4
- Career titles: 0
- Highest ranking: No. 159 (May 2, 2005)

Victor Ioniță (born May 11, 1983) is a former Romanian tennis player. On 23 May 2005, he reached his highest ATP singles ranking of no. 187. In 2015 he coached Romanian number 1 tennis player, who would later become World No 1, Simona Halep. He formerly coached Sorana Cîrstea, former World No 21.

== Challenger finals ==
=== Singles: 2 (1–1) ===
Legend
ATP Challenger Tour (1–1)

Result	No.	Date (Final)	Tournament	Surface	Opponent	Score
Win	1.	12 September 2004	Braşov, Romania	Clay	(Italy) Simone Bolelli	6–1, 7–6^{(7–3)}
Loss	2.	27 March 2005	Saint-Brieuc, France	Clay	(France) Olivier Patience	0–6, 2–6
