= Gabriel Moraru =

Romanian tennis player

- Country (sports): Romania
- Residence: Constanța, Romania
- Born: 27 January 1982 (age 43); Constanța, Socialist Republic of Romania
- Height: 1.80 m (5 ft 11 in)
- Turned pro: 2001
- Retired: 2014
- Plays: Right-handed (two-handed backhand)
- Prize money: $169,856

Singles
- Career record: 0–2
- Career titles: 0
- Highest ranking: No. 234 (25 July 2005)

Doubles
- Career record: 3–5
- Career titles: 0
- Highest ranking: No. 125 (19 September 2005)

Coaching career (2012–)
- (Romania) Marius Copil; (Romania) Irina-Camelia Begu; (Romania) Ana Bogdan
- Last updated on: 16 August 2017.

Gabriel Moraru (born 28 January 1982) is a retired Romanian tennis player and a tennis coach, currently is the General Manager of Romanian Tennis Federation.Since 2017 he is the coach of fellow Romanian Ana Bogdan. On 25 July 2005 he reached his highest ATP singles ranking of World No. 234 whilst his best doubles ranking was World No. 125 on 19 September 2005.

== Career finals ==
=== Doubles finals: 10 (4–6) ===
Legend Grand Slam tournaments (0–0) ATP World Tour Finals (0–0) ATP World Tour Masters 1000 (0–0) ATP World Tour 500 Series (0–0) ATP World Tour 250 Series (0–0) ATP Challenger Tour (4–6)	Titles by surface Hard (0–0) Grass (0–0) Clay (4–6) Carpet (0–0)

Result	No.	Date	Tournament	Surface	Partner	Opponents	Score
Loss	1.	14 November 2004	Buenos Aires, Argentina	Clay	(Romania) Victor Ioniță	(Italy) Enzo Artoni (Argentina) Ignacio González King	5–7, 3–6
Loss	2.	21 November 2004	Santa Cruz de la Sierra, Bolivia	Clay	(Romania) Victor Ioniță	(Italy) Enzo Artoni (Argentina) Ignacio González King	3–6, 1–6
Win	3.	27 March 2005	Saint–Brieuc, France	Clay (i)	(Romania) Victor Ioniță	(Slovakia) Michal Mertiňák (Czech Republic) Daniel Vacek	6–1, 6–4
Win	4.	7 August 2005	Timișoara, Romania	Clay	(Romania) Ionuț Moldovan	(Bulgaria) Ilia Kushev (Bulgaria) Radoslav Lukaev	6–2, 6–0
Win	5.	11 September 2005	Brașov, Romania	Clay	(Romania) Ionuț Moldovan	(Netherlands) Melvyn op der Heijde (Netherlands) Dennis van Scheppingen	6–1, 6–4
Loss	6.	15 July 2006	Oberstaufen, Germany	Clay	(Romania) Teodor-Dacian Crăciun	(Latvia) Ernests Gulbis (Germany) Mischa Zverev	1–6, 1–6
Loss	7.	23 July 2006	Rimini, Italy	Clay	(Greece) Vasilis Mazarakis	(Argentina) Juan Pablo Brzezicki (Argentina) Cristian Villagrán	2–6, 7–5, [6–10]
Win	8.	27 August 2006	Manerbio, Italy	Clay	(Romania) Adrian Ungur	(Poland) Michał Przysiężny (Italy) Federico Torresi	6–3, 6–3
Loss	9.	3 September 2006	Como, Italy	Clay	(Romania) Victor Crivoi	(United Kingdom) Jamie Delgado (United Kingdom) Jamie Murray	2–6, 6–4, [7–10]
Loss	10.	1 July 2007	Constanța, Romania	Clay	(Romania) Horia Tecău	(Spain) Marc Fornell-Mestres (Spain) Gabriel Trujillo-Soler	4–6, 4–6

== Disambiguation ==
Gabriel Moraru - Writer, electronics engineer, software engineer, open source proponent
