= Victor-Mugurel Anagnastopol =

Romanian tennis player

Victor Anagnastopol
- Full name: Victor-Mugurel Anagnastopol
- Country (sports): Romania
- Residence: Manerbio, Italy
- Born: 23 March 1986 (age 38); Bucharest, Romania
- Height: 1.93 m (6 ft 4 in)
- Turned pro: 2003
- Plays: Right-handed
- Prize money: US$39,363

Singles
- Career record: 0–0
- Career titles: 0
- Highest ranking: No. 469 (13 June 2011)

Doubles
- Career record: 1–2
- Career titles: 0
- Highest ranking: No. 295 (12 December 2012)
- Current ranking: No. 394 (14 November 2016)
- Last updated on: 17 November 2016.

Victor-Mugurel Anagnastopol (born 23 March 1986) is a Romanian tennis player. On 13 June 2011, he reached his highest ATP singles ranking of 469 whilst his highest doubles ranking was 295 achieved on 12 December 2012.

== Career finals ==
=== Doubles finals: 1 (1–0) ===
Legend Grand Slam tournaments (0) ATP World Tour Finals (0/0) ATP World Tour Masters 1000 (0/0) ATP World Tour 500 Series (0/0) ATP World Tour 250 Series (0/0) ATP Challenger Tour (1/0)	Titles by surface Hard (0/0) Grass (0/0) Clay (1/0) Carpet (0/0)

Outcome	No.	Date	Tournament	Surface	Partner	Opponents in the final	Score
Winners	1.	10 September 2011	Brașov, Romania	Clay	(Romania) Florin Mergea	(Czech Republic) Dušan Lojda (France) Benoît Paire	6–2, 6–3
