= BRD Brașov Challenger =

- 2014 BRD Brașov Challenger

Defunct tennis tournament
- Location: Brașov; Romania
- Venue: Complex Sportiv "Olimpia"
- Category: ATP Challenger Tour
- Surface: Clay / Outdoors
- Draw: 32S/32Q/16D
- Prize money: €35,000+H

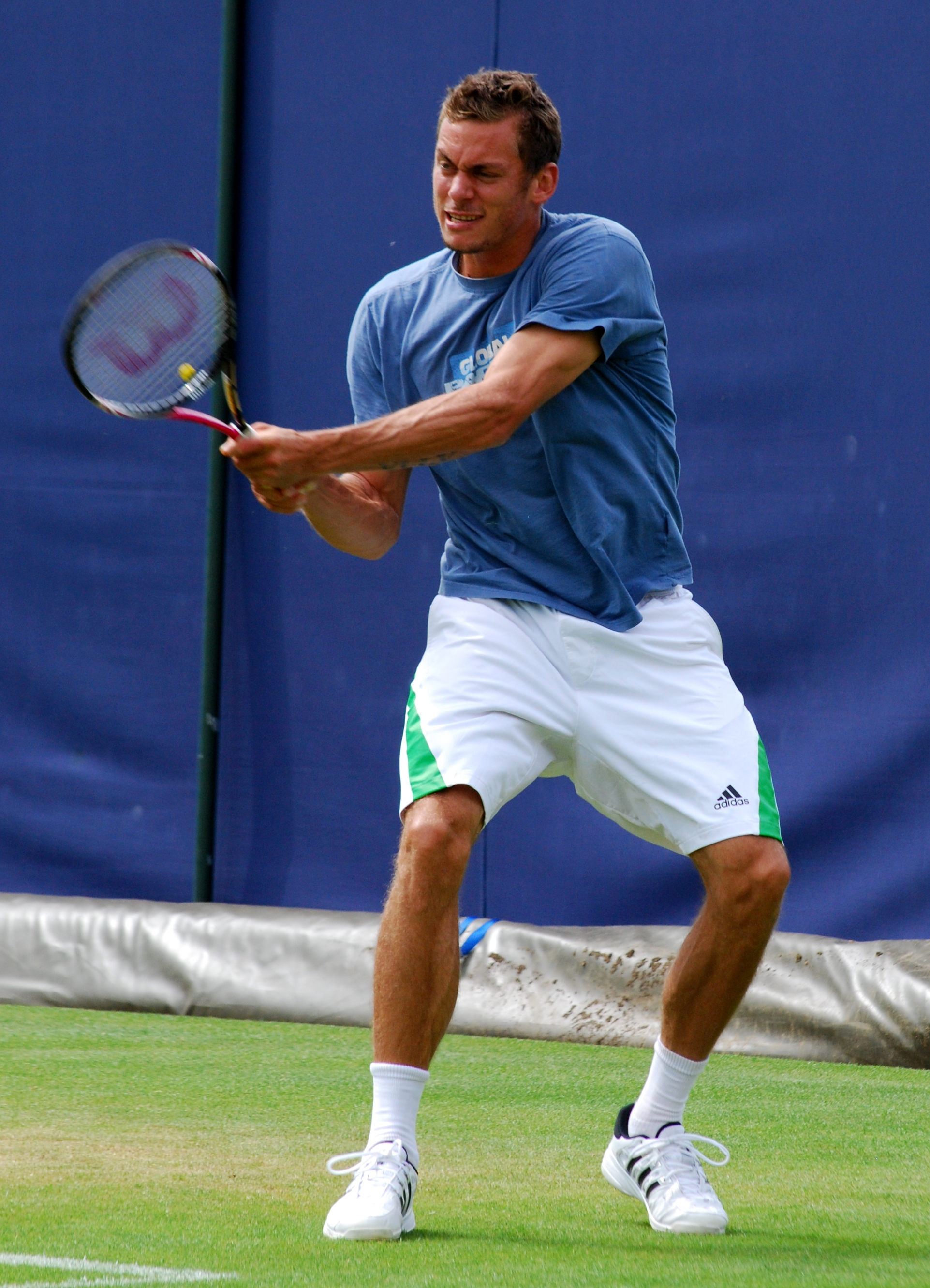
Austrian Andreas Haider-Maurer is the most recent champion, lifting the trophy twice, in 2012 & 2013

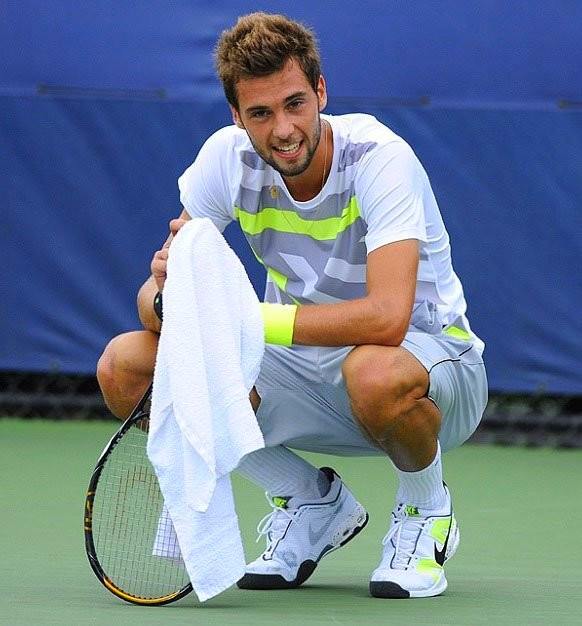
Frenchman Benoît Paire lifted the singles trophy in 2011

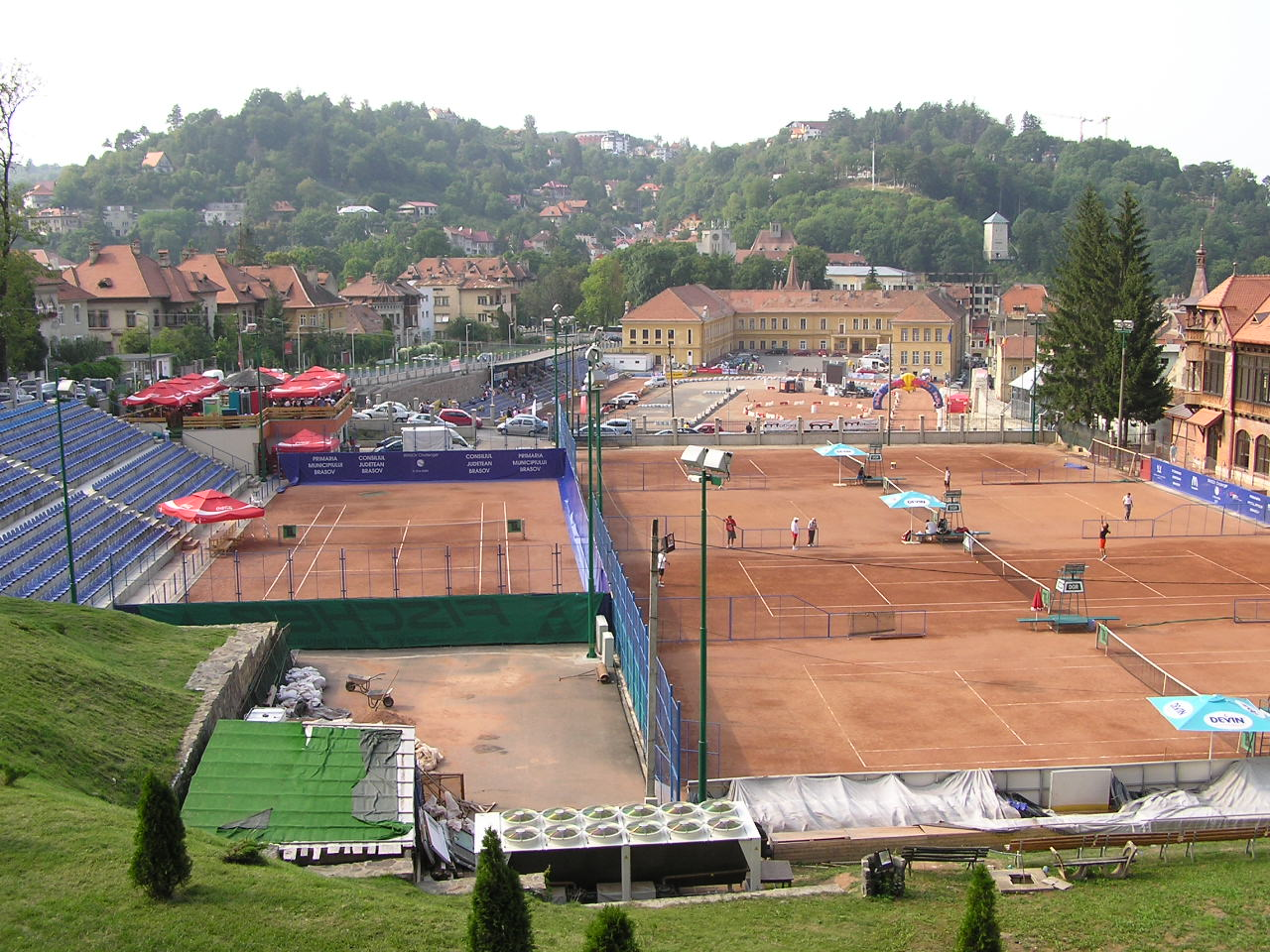
The tournament is held at the "Olimpia" Sports Complex in Braşov.

The BRD Brașov Challenger was a tennis tournament held in Braşov, Romania from 1996 until 2014. The event was part of the ATP Challenger Tour and was played on outdoor clay courts. After a 10-year break it was reinstated as the Ion Țiriac Challenger in 2024.

== Past finals ==
=== Singles ===
Year	Champion	Runner-up	Score
2014	(Austria) Andreas Haider-Maurer	(France) Guillaume Rufin	6–3, 6–2
2013	(Austria) Andreas Haider-Maurer	(Austria) Gerald Melzer	6–7^{(9–11)}, 6–4, 6-2
2012	(Austria) Andreas Haider-Maurer	(Romania) Adrian Ungur	3–6, 7–5, 6–2
2011	(France) Benoît Paire	(France) Maxime Teixeira	6–4, 3–0, ret.
2010	(France) Éric Prodon	(Czech Republic) Jaroslav Pospíšil	7–6^{(7–1)}, 6–3
2009	(Netherlands) Thiemo de Bakker	(Spain) Pere Riba	7–5, 6–0
2008	(Spain) Daniel Gimeno-Traver	(Germany) Alexander Flock	4–6, 6–4, 6–4
2007	(Argentina) Máximo González	(France) Olivier Patience	6–4, 6–3
2006	(Spain) Marc López	(Romania) Victor Crivoi	4–6, 6–3, 7–6
2005	(Germany) Daniel Elsner	(Spain) Daniel Gimeno-Traver	7–5, 6–2
2004	(Romania) Victor Ioniță	(Italy) Simone Bolelli	6–1, 7–6
2003	(Germany) Daniel Elsner	(Romania) Răzvan Sabău	6–2, 6–1
2002	(Spain) Rubén Ramírez Hidalgo	(Croatia) Lovro Zovko	2–6, 6–1, 7–5
2001	(Italy) Stefano Galvani	(Spain) Iván Navarro	6–4, 6–1
2000	(Brazil) Alexandre Simoni	(Belgium) Dick Norman	7–5, 6–3
1999	(Spain) David Sánchez-Muñoz	(France) Thierry Guardiola	6–2, 0–6, 6–2
1998	(Romania) Dinu Pescariu	(Denmark) Thomas Larsen	6–3, 3–6, 6–2
1997	(Romania) Ionuț Moldovan	(Romania) Dinu Pescariu	6–2, 6–4
1996	(Romania) Dinu Pescariu	(Romania) Răzvan Sabău	4–6, 6–2, 6–3

=== Doubles ===
Year	Champions	Runners-up	Score
2014	(Italy) Daniele Giorgini (Romania) Adrian Ungur	(Russia) Aslan Karatsev (Russia) Valery Rudnev	4–6, 7–6^{(7–4)}, [10–1]
2013	(Ukraine) Oleksandr Nedovyesov (Czech Republic) Jaroslav Pospíšil	(Romania) Teodor-Dacian Crăciun (Romania) Petru-Alexandru Luncanu	6-3, 6-1
2012	(Romania) Marius Copil (Romania) Victor Crivoi	(Moldova) Andrei Ciumac (Ukraine) Oleksandr Nedovyesov	6–7^{(8–10)}, 6–4, [12–10]
2011	(Romania) Victor Anagnastopol (Romania) Florin Mergea	(Czech Republic) Dušan Lojda (France) Benoît Paire	6–2, 6–3
2010	(Italy) Flavio Cipolla (Italy) Daniele Giorgini	(Moldova) Radu Albot (Moldova) Andrei Ciumac	6–3, 6–4
2009	(Spain) Pere Riba (Spain) Pablo Santos	(Italy) Simone Vagnozzi (Italy) Uros Vico	6–3, 6–2
2008	(Spain) David Marrero (Spain) Daniel Muñoz-de la Nava	(Spain) Carles Poch-Gradin (Spain) Pablo Santos	6–4, 6–3
2007	(Romania) Florin Mergea (Romania) Horia Tecău	(Romania) Adrian Cruciat (Romania) Marcel-Ioan Miron	5–7, 6–3, [10–8]
2006	(North Macedonia) Lazar Magdinčev (North Macedonia) Predrag Rusevski	(Netherlands) Robin Haase (Czech Republic) Michal Navrátil	6–4, 7–6
2005	(Romania) Ionuț Moldovan (Romania) Gabriel Moraru	(Netherlands) Melvyn op der Heijde (Netherlands) Dennis van Scheppingen	6–1, 6–4
2004	(Spain) Salvador Navarro-Gutiérrez (Spain) Rubén Ramírez Hidalgo	(Argentina) Juan Pablo Brzezicki (Argentina) Juan Pablo Guzmán	6–3, 6–2
2003	(Austria) Alexander Peya (Netherlands) Rogier Wassen	(Italy) Leonardo Azzaro (Italy) Stefano Galvani	6–2, 6–4
2002	(Germany) Christopher Kas (Austria) Herbert Wiltschnig	(Spain) Rubén Ramírez Hidalgo (Spain) Santiago Ventura	5–7, 6–4, 7–5
2001	(Israel) Amir Hadad (Croatia) Lovro Zovko	(Australia) Ben Ellwood (Sweden) Kalle Flygt	6–1, 4–6, 6–4
2000	(Romania) Ionuț Moldovan (Russia) Yuri Schukin	(Belgium) Dick Norman (Austria) Wolfgang Schranz	6–4, 6–1
1999	(Romania) Andrei Pavel (Romania) Gabriel Trifu	(Romania) George Cosac (Romania) Dinu Pescariu	6–2, 6–2
1998	(Spain) Juan-Ignacio Carrasco (Spain) Jairo Velasco, Jr.	(Czech Republic) Tomáš Cibulec (Czech Republic) Leoš Friedl	6–4, 3–6, 6–2
1997	(Romania) George Cosac (United Kingdom) Miles Maclagan	(Romania) Ionuț Moldovan (Romania) Dinu Pescariu	6–4, 7–6
1996	(Romania) George Cosac (Romania) Dinu Pescariu	(Argentina) Mariano Hood (Argentina) Martín Rodríguez	7–6, 6–1
