= Adrian Cruciat =

Romanian tennis player

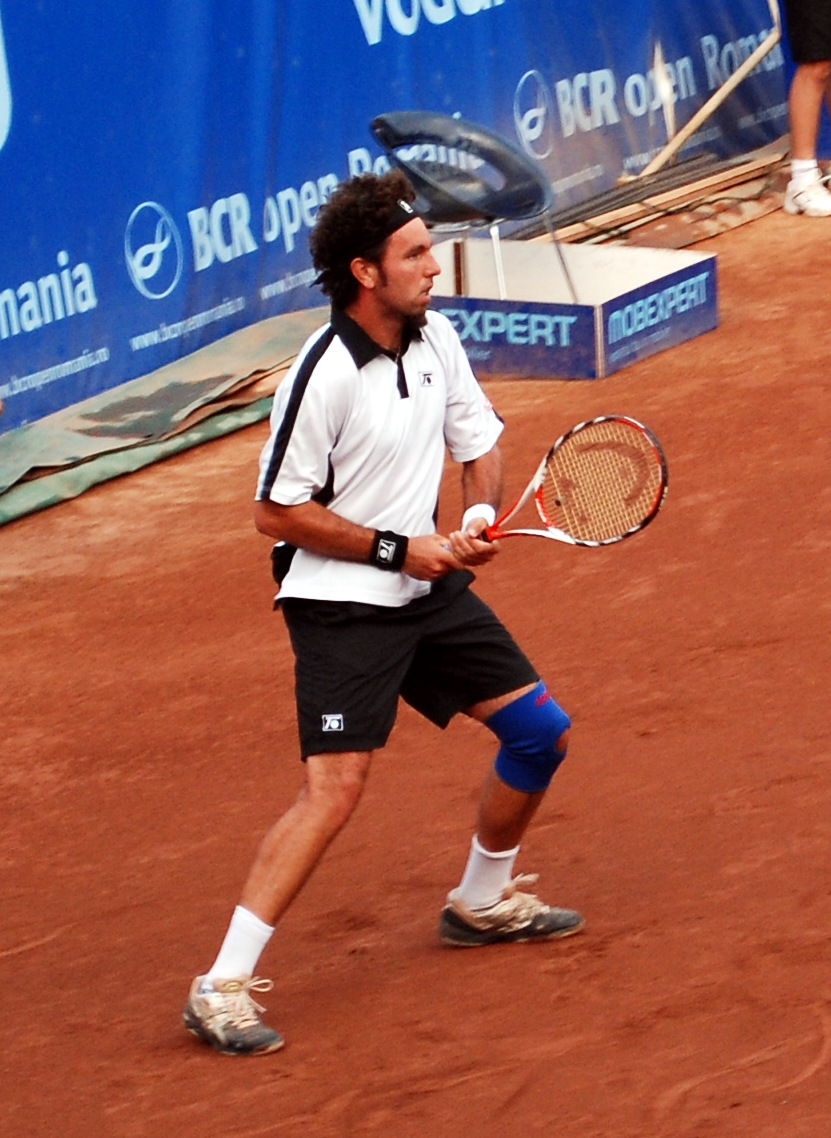
- Adrian Cruciat at the 2008 BCR Open Romania
- Country (sports): Romania
- Born: 31 March 1983 (age 42) Timișoara, Romania
- Turned pro: 1999
- Retired: 2012
- Plays: Right-handed
- Prize money: US$208,348

Singles
- Career record: 1–2
- Career titles: 0
- Highest ranking: No. 148 (16 June 2008)

Doubles
- Career record: 0–2
- Career titles: 0
- Highest ranking: No. 218 (7 April 2008)

Adrian Cruciat (born 31 March 1983) is former a Romanian tennis player. On 16 June 2008 he reached his highest ATP singles ranking of 148. He retired in 2012, and in 2013 he became a television pundit for Digi Sport.

== ATP Challenger Tour singles finals: 1 (0–1) ==
Legend (pre/post 2009) Grand Slam tournaments (0) Tennis Masters Cup / ATP World Tour Finals (0) ATP Masters Series / ATP World Tour Masters 1000 (0) ATP International Series Gold / ATP World Tour 500 Series (0) ATP International Series / ATP World Tour 250 Series (0) ATP Challenger Series / ATP Challenger Tour (0)	Titles by surface Hard (0) Grass (0) Clay (0) Carpet (0)

=== Runners-up (1) ===
No.	Date	Tournament	Surface	Opponent in the final	Score
1.	24 May 2008	Athens, Greece	Clay	(Netherlands) Martin Verkerk	3–6, 3–6
