= Cătălin-Ionuț Gârd =

Romanian tennis player

Catalin Gard
- Country (sports): United States (2014–); Romania (1998–2014)
- Born: Cătălin-Ionuț Gârd; 10 July 1981 (age 43); Galați, Romania
- Height: 1.75 m (5 ft 9 in)
- Turned pro: 2000
- Plays: Right-handed
- Prize money: US$162,058

Singles
- Career record: 0–1
- Career titles: 0
- Highest ranking: No. 224 (February 18, 2008)

Doubles
- Career record: 0–0
- Career titles: 0
- Highest ranking: No. 236 (April 20, 2009)
- Last updated on: January 26, 2018.

Catalin Gard (born 10 July 1981 as Cătălin-Ionuț Gârd) is a Romanian-American tennis player. On February 18, 2008, he reached his highest ATP singles ranking of 224 whilst his highest doubles ranking was 528 achieved on April 20, 2009.
