= Petru-Alexandru Luncanu =

Romanian tennis player

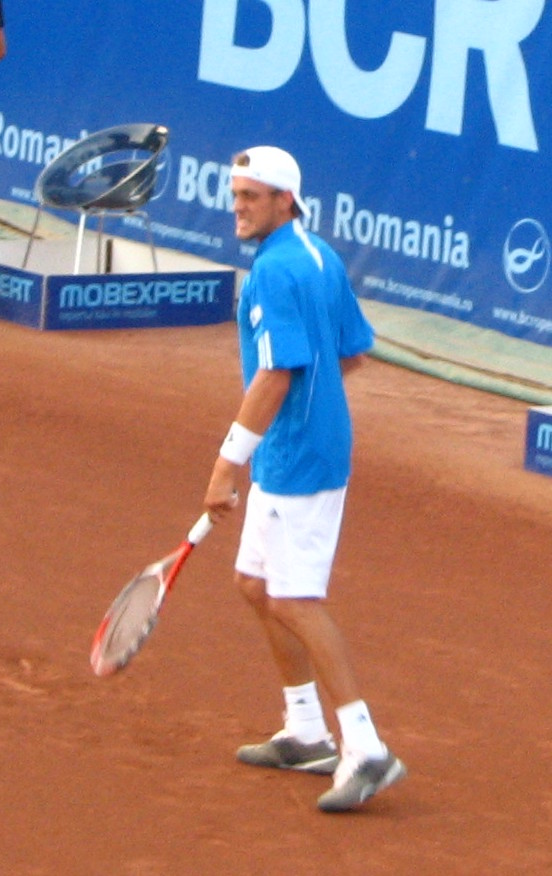
- Petru-Alexandru Luncanu at the 2008 BCR Open Romania
- Country (sports): Romania
- Residence: Bucharest, Romania
- Born: 7 May 1989 (age 36) Bucharest, Socialist Republic of Romania
- Height: 1.85 m (6 ft 1 in)
- Turned pro: 2005
- Plays: Left-handed (two-handed backhand)
- Coach: Ady Ayram
- Prize money: US$155,975

Singles
- Career record: 0–4
- Career titles: 0
- Highest ranking: No. 304 (2 November 2009)

Doubles
- Career record: 0–3
- Career titles: 0
- Highest ranking: No. 286 (2 November 2015)

Petru-Alexandru Luncanu (born 7 May 1989) is a Romanian professional tennis player. Luncanu has played on the ITF Men's Circuit, the ATP Challenger Tour and for the Romania Davis Cup Team. On 2 November 2009 he reached his highest ATP singles ranking of No. 304 whilst his highest doubles ranking was No. 286, which he achieved on 2 November 2015. In 2023, Luncanu was banned from professional tennis for five years and fined $40,000 by the International Tennis Integrity Agency after being found guilty of five match fixing charges between 2017 and 2021.

== Davis Cup ==
=== Singles performances (0–2) ===
Edition	Round	Date	Against	Surface	Opponent	Win/Loss	Result
2012 Europe/Africa Zone Group I	2R	6–8 April 2012	Netherlands	Hard (i)	(Netherlands) Thomas Schoorel	Loss	1–6, 3–6, 3–6
2012 Europe/Africa Zone Group I	2R	6–8 April 2012	Netherlands	Hard (i)	(Netherlands) Robin Haase	Loss	5–7, 2–6
