= 1998 Paegas Czech Open – Doubles =

Doubles
- 1998 Paegas Czech Open

Final
- Champions: (Australia) Wayne Arthurs (Australia) Andrew Kratzmann
- Runners-up: (Sweden) Fredrik Bergh (Sweden) Nicklas Kulti
- Score: 6–1, 6–1

Events
Singles	Doubles
← 1997 ·	Prague Open	· 1999 →

The 1998 Paegas Czech Open was a men's tennis tournament played on Clay in Prague, Czech Republic that was part of the International Series of the 1998 ATP Tour. It was the twelfth edition of the tournament and was held from 27 April – 3 May 1998.

== Seeds ==
Champion seeds are indicated in bold text while text in italics indicates the round in which those seeds were eliminated.

1. (Argentina) Luis Lobo / (Argentina) Daniel Orsanic (semifinals)
2. (Czech Republic) Jiří Novák / (Czech Republic) Pavel Vízner (first round)
3. (Germany) Marc-Kevin Goellner / (Germany) David Prinosil (first round)
4. (Mexico) David Roditi / (Netherlands) Fernon Wibier (first round)

== Draw ==
=== Key ===
- Q = Qualifier
- WC = Wild card
- LL = Lucky loser
- Alt = Alternate
- ITF = ITF entry
- PR = Protected ranking
- SR = Special ranking
- SE = Special exempt
- JE = Junior exempt
- JR = Junior Accelerator Programme entrant
- CO = College Accelerator Programme entrant
- NG = Next Gen Accelerator Program entrant
- w/o = Walkover
- r = Retired
- d = Defaulted

=== Finals ===
First round
1	(Argentina) **L Lobo** **(Argentina) D Orsanic**	**7**	**6**
(Czech Republic) C Suk (Czech Republic) B Ulihrach	6	4
(Russia) **A Cherkasov** **(Russia) Y Kafelnikov**	**6**	**6**
(United States) D Bowen (Finland) T Ketola	2	2
(Australia) **(Australia) W Arthurs** **(Australia) A Kratzmann**	**6**	**7**
3	(Germany) M-K Goellner (Germany) D Prinosil	2	6
(Czech Republic) **P Luxa** **(Czech Republic) D Škoch**	**6**	5	**7**
(Brazil) F Meligeni (Brazil) A Sá	4	**7**	5
(Argentina) **M Hood** **(Argentina) S Prieto**	**6**	**7**
(Czech Republic) C Doseděl (Slovakia) K Kučera	2	6
(Australia) **P Kilderry** **(Ecuador) N Lapentti**	**6**	**6**
4	(Mexico) D Roditi (Netherlands) F Wibier	2	3
(South Africa) **M Ondruska** **(United States) J Tarango**	6	**6**	**6**
(Czech Republic) P Pála (Czech Republic) R Štěpánek	**7**	0	4
(Sweden) **F Bergh** **(Sweden) N Kulti**	**6**	**6**
2	(Czech Republic) J Novák (Czech Republic) P Vízner	3	3

Quarterfinals
1	(Argentina) **L Lobo** **(Argentina) D Orsanic**	**6**	**6**
(Russia) A Cherkasov (Russia) Y Kafelnikov	2	4
(Australia) **W Arthurs** **(Australia) A Kratzmann**	**6**	**6**
(Czech Republic) P Luxa (Czech Republic) D Škoch	3	4
(Argentina) **M Hood** **(Argentina) S Prieto**	**7**	**7**
(Australia) P Kilderry (Ecuador) N Lapentti	6	5
(South Africa) M Ondruska (United States) J Tarango	3	3
(Sweden) **F Bergh** **(Sweden) N Kulti**	**6**	**6**

Semifinals
1	(Argentina) L Lobo (Argentina) D Orsanic	1	**6**	6
(Australia) **W Arthurs** **(Australia) A Kratzmann**	**6**	3	**7**
(Argentina) M Hood (Argentina) S Prieto	6	**6**	3
(Sweden) **F Bergh** **(Sweden) N Kulti**	**7**	4	**6**

Final
(Australia) **W Arthurs** **(Australia) A Kratzmann**	**6**	**6**
(Sweden) F Bergh (Sweden) N Kulti	1	1
