= 1998 Paegas Czech Open – Singles =

Singles
- 1998 Paegas Czech Open

Final
- Champion: (Brazil) Fernando Meligeni
- Runner-up: (Czech Republic) Ctislav Doseděl
- Score: 6–1, 6–4

Events
Singles	Doubles
← 1997 ·	Prague Open	· 1999 →

The 1998 Paegas Czech Open was a male tennis tournament played on Clay in Prague, Czech Republic that was part of the International Series of the 1998 ATP Tour. It was the twelfth edition of the tournament and was held from 27 April – 3 May 1998.

== Seeds ==
Champion seeds are indicated in bold text while text in italics indicates the round in which those seeds were eliminated.

1. (Czech Republic) Petr Korda (second round)
2. (Russia) Yevgeny Kafelnikov (second round)
3. (Slovakia) Karol Kučera (first round)
4. (France) Cédric Pioline (first round)
5. (Australia) Richard Fromberg (first round)
6. (Czech Republic) Bohdan Ulihrach (first round)
7. (United States) Jeff Tarango (first round)
8. (Uruguay) Marcelo Filippini (first round)

== Draw ==
=== Key ===
- Q = Qualifier
- WC = Wild card
- LL = Lucky loser
- Alt = Alternate
- SE = Special exempt
- PR = Protected ranking
- ITF = ITF entry
- JE = Junior exempt
- w/o = Walkover
- r = Retired
- d = Defaulted
- SR = Special ranking

=== Finals ===
Semifinals
**(Czech Republic) Ctislav Doseděl**	3	**6**	**6**
(Ecuador) Nicolás Lapentti	**6**	3	2
(Romania) Dinu Mihai Pescariu	6^{5}	6^{2}
**(Brazil) Fernando Meligeni**	**7**	**7**

Final
(Czech Republic) Ctislav Doseděl	1	4
**(Brazil) Fernando Meligeni**	**6**	**6**

=== Top half ===
First round
1	**(Czech Republic) P Korda**	**6**	**6**
(Czech Republic) P Kralert	2	1
**(Czech Republic) C Doseděl**	2	**7**	**6**
(Netherlands) S Schalken	**6**	6^{4}	1
**(Austria) G Schaller**	**7**	**6**
(Germany) M-K Goellner	6^{3}	1
**(Spain) J Diaz**	**6**	**6**
8	(Uruguay) M Filippini	2	4
**(Italy) R Furlan**	0	**6**	**6**
4	(France) C Pioline	**6**	1	2
**(Spain) F Vicente**	**6**	**6**
(Spain) J Burillo	1	2
**(Germany) M Sinner**	**6**	4	**6**
(Finland) T Nurminen	2	**6**	3
**(Ecuador) N Lapentti**	**6**	**6**
6	(Czech Republic) B Ulihrach	4	4

Second round
1	(Czech Republic) P Korda	3	2
**(Czech Republic) C Doseděl**	**6**	**6**
(Austria) G Schaller	**6**	1	4
**(Spain) J Diaz**	4	**6**	**6**
(Italy) R Furlan	**6**	1	4
**(Spain) F Vicente**	3	**6**	**6**
(Germany) M Sinner	2	0
**(Ecuador) N Lapentti**	**6**	**6**

Quarterfinals
**(Czech Republic) C Doseděl**	**6**	**6**
(Spain) J Diaz	1	4
(Spain) F Vicente	0	5
**(Ecuador) N Lapentti**	**6**	**7**

Semifinals
**(Czech Republic) C Doseděl**	3	**6**	**6**
(Ecuador) N Lapentti	**6**	3	2

=== Bottom half ===
First round
**(Czech Republic) M Tabara**	**7**	2	**7**
5	(Australia) R Fromberg	6^{3}	**6**	5
**(Romania) D Pescariu**	**6**	**7**
(Germany) D Prinosil	3	5
**(Spain) J Sánchez**	1	**7**	**7**
(France) J Golmard	**6**	5	6^{11}
**(Czech Republic) R Vašek**	**6**	1	**6**
3	(Slovakia) K Kučera	2	**6**	2
**(Russia) A Chesnokov**	**7**	**6**
7	(United States) J Tarango	6^{4}	3
**(Spain) A Portas**	**7**	**6**
(Germany) H Dreekmann	5	3
**(Brazil) F Meligeni**	**6**	**6**
(Russia) A Cherkasov	4	3
2	**(Russia) Y Kafelnikov**	4	**6**	**6**
(Czech Republic) J Novák	**6**	3	3

Second round
(Czech Republic) M Tabara	3	2
**(Romania) D Pescariu**	**6**	**6**
**(Spain) J Sánchez**	**7**	**6**
(Czech Republic) R Vašek	6^{11}	1
**(Russia) A Chesnokov**	**6**	**6**
(Spain) A Portas	4	0
**(Brazil) F Meligeni**	**6**	**6**
2	(Russia) Y Kafelnikov	4	4

Quarterfinals
**(Romania) D Pescariu**	6^{4}	**6**	**6**
(Spain) J Sánchez	**7**	3	3
(Russia) A Chesnokov	3	1
**(Brazil) F Meligeni**	**6**	**6**

Semifinals
(Romania) D Pescariu	6^{5}	6^{2}
**(Brazil) F Meligeni**	**7**	**7**
