= 1997 AT&T Challenge – Doubles =

Doubles
- 1997 AT&T Challenge

Final
- Champions: (Sweden) Jonas Björkman (Sweden) Nicklas Kulti
- Runners-up: (United States) Scott Davis (United States) Kelly Jones
- Score: 6–2, 7–6

Details
- Draw: 16 (3WC/1Q)
- Seeds: 4

Events
Singles	Doubles
← 1996 ·	Verizon Tennis Challenge	· 1998 →

Christo van Rensburg and David Wheaton were the defending champions, but none played this year. Van Rensburg chose to compete at Prague during the same week, losing in the first round.

Jonas Björkman and Nicklas Kulti won the title by defeating Scott Davis and Kelly Jones 6–2, 7–6 in the final.

== Seeds ==
1. (Zimbabwe) Byron Black / (United States) Alex O'Brien (quarterfinals)
2. (Sweden) Jonas Björkman / (Sweden) Nicklas Kulti (champions)
3. (Czech Republic) Cyril Suk / (Australia) Sandon Stolle (semifinals)
4. (United States) Trevor Kronemann / (Australia) David Macpherson (quarterfinals)

== Draw ==
=== Key ===
- Q = Qualifier
- WC = Wild card
- LL = Lucky loser
- Alt = Alternate
- SE = Special exempt
- PR = Protected ranking
- ITF = ITF entry
- JE = Junior exempt
- w/o = Walkover
- r = Retired
- d = Defaulted
- SR = Special ranking

=== Draw ===
First round
1	(Zimbabwe) B Black (United States) A O'Brien	6	6
WC	(United States) R Blake (United States) Larry Schnall	4	4
(South Africa) M Ondruska (South Africa) G Stafford	4	7	7
(Argentina) J Frana (Czech Republic) P Korda	6	6	5
4	(United States) T Kronemann (Australia) D Macpherson	5	7	6
(Canada) S Lareau (Canada) S Leblanc	7	5	1
(Netherlands) T Kempers (Netherlands) T Nijssen	5	3
(United States) S Davis (United States) K Jones	7	6
WC	(United States) B Bryan (United States) M Bryan	1	2
WC	(United States) A Agassi (Armenia) S Sargsian	6	6
(United States) M Keil (United States) C Woodruff	1	4
3	(Australia) S Stolle (Czech Republic) C Suk	6	6
Q	(United States) L Jensen (United States) M Jensen	6	6
(United States) B MacPhie (United States) TJ Middleton	3	3
(Canada) G Connell (Australia) P Kilderry	4	4
2	(Sweden) J Björkman (Sweden) N Kulti	6	6

Quarterfinals
1	(Zimbabwe) B Black (United States) A O'Brien	6	4	3
(South Africa) M Ondruska (South Africa) G Stafford	2	6	6
4	(United States) T Kronemann (Australia) D Macpherson	2	6
(United States) S Davis (United States) K Jones	6	7
WC	(United States) A Agassi (Armenia) S Sargsian	6	3	4
3	(Australia) S Stolle (Czech Republic) C Suk	3	6	6
Q	(United States) L Jensen (United States) M Jensen	4	2
2	(Sweden) J Björkman (Sweden) N Kulti	6	6

Semifinals
(South Africa) M Ondruska (South Africa) G Stafford	7	5	6
(United States) S Davis (United States) K Jones	5	7	7
3	(Australia) S Stolle (Czech Republic) C Suk	1	6
2	(Sweden) J Björkman (Sweden) N Kulti	6	7

Final
(United States) S Davis (United States) K Jones	2	6
2	(Sweden) J Björkman (Sweden) N Kulti	6	7
