= 1998 AT&T Challenge – Singles =

Singles
- 1998 AT&T Challenge

Final
- Champion: (United States) Pete Sampras
- Runner-up: (Australia) Jason Stoltenberg
- Score: 6–7^{(2–7)}, 6–3, 7–6^{(7–4)}

Details
- Draw: 32
- Seeds: 8

Events
Singles	Doubles
← 1997 ·	AT&T Challenge	· 1999 →

The 1998 AT&T Challenge was a men's tennis tournament played on clay in Atlanta, United States that was part of the International Series of the 1998 ATP Tour. It was the thirteenth edition of the tournament and was held from April 27 through May 3, 1998.

== Seeds ==
Champion seeds are indicated in bold text while text in italics indicates the round in which those seeds were eliminated.

1. (United States) **Pete Sampras (champion)**
2. (Australia) Jason Stoltenberg (final)
3. (United States) Jim Courier (first round)
4. (United States) Vince Spadea (first round)
5. (United States) Jan-Michael Gambill (second round)
6. (Romania) Andrei Pavel (semifinals)
7. (Italy) Gianluca Pozzi (first round)
8. (Zimbabwe) Wayne Black (second round)

== Draw ==
=== Key ===
- Q = Qualifier
- WC = Wild card
- LL = Lucky loser
- Alt = Alternate
- ITF = ITF entry
- PR = Protected ranking
- SR = Special ranking
- SE = Special exempt
- JE = Junior exempt
- JR = Junior Accelerator Programme entrant
- CO = College Accelerator Programme entrant
- NG = Next Gen Accelerator Program entrant
- w/o = Walkover
- r = Retired
- d = Defaulted

=== Finals ===
Semifinals
1	**(United States) Pete Sampras**	**7**	**6**
(Spain) Álex Calatrava	6^{6}	3
6	(Romania) Andrei Pavel	**6**	4
2	**(Australia) Jason Stoltenberg**	**6**	4

Final
1	**(United States) Pete Sampras**	6^{2}	**6**	**7**
2	(Australia) Jason Stoltenberg	**7**	3	6^{4}

=== Top half ===
First round
**(United States) P Sampras**	**6**	**7**
(United States) A O'Brien	2	6^{5}
**(Italy) D Sanguinetti**	**6**	**6**
(The Bahamas) M Knowles	3	2
**(Paraguay) R Delgado**	**6**	**6**
(Costa Rica) JA Marín	4	2
**(Belgium) J Van Herck**	**6**	**6**
7	(Italy) G Pozzi	2	4
**(Netherlands) D van Scheppingen**	**6**	4	**7**
4	(United States) V Spadea	3	**6**	5
**(Spain) Á Calatrava**	4	**6**	**6**
(South Africa) G Stafford	**6**	2	4
**(United States) S Campbell**	**6**	**6**
(Canada) S Lareau	3	4
5	**(United States) J-M Gambill**	0	**7**	**7**
(Argentina) M Zabaleta	**6**	6^{2}	5

Second round
1	**(United States) P Sampras**	**6**	5	**7**
(Italy) D Sanguinetti	3	**7**	5
**(Paraguay) R Delgado**	**6**	**6**
(Belgium) J Van Herck	3	1
(Netherlands) D van Scheppingen	**6**	1	4
**(Spain) Á Calatrava**	4	**6**	**6**
**(United States) S Campbell**	**6**	**7**
5	(United States) J-M Gambill	2	6^{7}

Quarterfinals
1	**(United States) P Sampras**	**7**	**7**
(Paraguay) R Delgado	6^{6}	6^{3}
**(Spain) Á Calatrava**	4
(United States) S Campbell	0^{r}

Semifinals
1	**(United States) P Sampras**	**7**	**6**
(Spain) Á Calatrava	6^{6}	3

=== Bottom half ===
First round
6	**(Romania) A Pavel**	**6**	**6**
(Armenia) S Sargsian	4	4
**(Netherlands) J van Lottum**	4	**6**	**6**
(Germany) M Craca	**6**	3	2
**(Argentina) F Squillari**	**6**	**6**
(Sweden) M Tillström	3	3
**(Brazil) M Carlsson**	**6**	2	**6**
3	(United States) J Courier	3	**6**	4
8	**(Zimbabwe) W Black**	4	**6**	**6**
(United States) J Palmer	**6**	2	1
**(United States) R Reneberg**	**6**	**6**
(Mexico) A Hernández	3	1
**(United States) MV Washington**	**6**	**6**
(Australia) M Tebbutt	0	0
2	**(Australia) J Stoltenberg**	**6**	**6**
(Peru) L Horna	3	4

Second round
6	**(Romania) A Pavel**	**6**	**6**
(Netherlands) J van Lottum	1	2
**(Argentina) F Squillari**	**6**	**7**
(Brazil) M Carlsson	3	5
8	(Zimbabwe) W Black	**7**	2	1
**(United States) R Reneberg**	4	**6**	**6**
(United States) MV Washington	2	4
2	**(Australia) J Stoltenberg**	**6**	**6**

Quarterfinals
6	**(Romania) A Pavel**	**6**	**6**
(Argentina) F Squillari	1	2
(United States) R Reneberg	4	1
2	**(Australia) J Stoltenberg**	**6**	**6**

Semifinals
6	(Romania) A Pavel	**6**	4
2	**(Australia) J Stoltenberg**	**6**	4
