= 1997 Paegas Czech Open =

- Date: 28 April – 4 May
- Edition: 11th
- Category: World Series
- Draw: 32S / 16D
- Prize money: $340,000
- Surface: Clay / outdoor
- Location: Prague, Czech Republic
- Venue: I. Czech Lawn Tennis Club

Champions

Singles
- (France) Cédric Pioline

Doubles
- (India) Mahesh Bhupathi / (India) Leander Paes
- Prague Open

The 1997 Paegas Czech Open, also known as the Prague Open, was a men's tennis tournament played on outdoor clay courts at the I. Czech Lawn Tennis Club in Prague, Czech Republic that was part of the World Series of the 1997 ATP Tour. It was the 11th edition of the tournament and was held from 28 April until 4 May 1997. Fourth-seeded Cédric Pioline won the singles title.

== Finals ==
=== Singles ===
(France) Cédric Pioline defeated (Czech Republic) Bohdan Ulihrach 6–2, 5–7, 7–6^{(7–4)}

- It was Pioline's 1st singles title of the year and the 2nd of his career.

=== Doubles ===
(India) Mahesh Bhupathi / (India) Leander Paes defeated (Czech Republic) Petr Luxa / (Czech Republic) David Škoch 6–1, 6–1

== See also ==
- 1997 Skoda Czech Open – women's tournament
