= 1993 AT&T Challenge =

Tennis tournament

- Date: April 26 – May 2
- Edition: 9th
- Category: World Series
- Draw: 32S / 16D
- Prize money: $275,000
- Surface: Clay / outdoor
- Location: Johns Creek, Georgia, U.S.
- Venue: Atlanta Athletic Club

Champions

Singles
- (Netherlands) Jacco Eltingh

Doubles
- (United States) Paul Annacone / (United States) Richey Reneberg
← 1992 ·	AT&T Challenge	· 1994 →

The 1993 AT&T Challenge was a men's tennis tournament played on outdoor clay courts in Atlanta, Georgia, United States that was part of the World Series of the 1993 ATP Tour. It was the ninth edition of the tournament and was held from April 26 through May 2, 1993. Unseeded Jacco Eltingh won the singles title.

== Finals ==
=== Singles ===
(Netherlands) Jacco Eltingh defeated (United States) Bryan Shelton, 7–6^{(7–1)}, 6–2

- It was Eltingh's 1st singles title of the year and 2nd of his career.

=== Doubles ===
(United States) Paul Annacone / (United States) Richey Reneberg defeated (United States) Todd Martin / (United States) Jared Palmer 6–4, 7–6
