= 1994 AT&T Challenge – Singles =

Singles
- 1994 AT&T Challenge

Final
- Champion: (United States) Michael Chang
- Runner-up: (United States) Todd Martin
- Score: 6–7^{(4–7)}, 7–6^{(7–4)}, 6–0

Details
- Draw: 32 (3WC/4Q)
- Seeds: 8

Events
Singles	Doubles
← 1993 ·	Verizon Tennis Challenge	· 1995 →

Jacco Eltingh was the defending champion, but lost in the first round to Richey Reneberg.

Michael Chang won the title by defeating Todd Martin 6–7^{(4–7)}, 7–6^{(7–4)}, 6–0 in the final.

== Seeds ==
1. (United States) Michael Chang (champion)
2. (United States) Todd Martin (final)
3. (United States) Andre Agassi (quarterfinals)
4. (United States) Aaron Krickstein (first round)
5. (United States) MaliVai Washington (semifinals)
6. (United States) Brad Gilbert (first round)
7. (Sweden) Mikael Pernfors (first round)
8. (Australia) Jason Stoltenberg (second round)

== Draw ==
=== Key ===
- Q = Qualifier
- WC = Wild card
- LL = Lucky loser
- Alt = Alternate
- ITF = ITF entry
- PR = Protected ranking
- SR = Special ranking
- SE = Special exempt
- JE = Junior exempt
- JR = Junior Accelerator Programme entrant
- CO = College Accelerator Programme entrant
- NG = Next Gen Accelerator Program entrant
- w/o = Walkover
- r = Retired
- d = Defaulted

=== Finals ===
Semifinals
1	(United States) Michael Chang	6	6
5	(United States) MaliVai Washington	1	2
Q	(United States) Wade McGuire	2	6^{4}
2	(United States) Todd Martin	6	7^{7}

Final
1	(United States) Michael Chang	6^{4}	7^{7}	6
2	(United States) Todd Martin	7^{7}	6^{4}	0

=== Top half ===
First round
1	(United States) M Chang	6	6
Q	(United States) R Weiss	4	1
(Brazil) L Mattar	6	6
(Australia) T Woodbridge	2	1
Q	(Sweden) C Bergström	6	6
(United States) J Palmer	2	3
(Slovakia) K Kučera	2	6^{3}
8	(Australia) J Stoltenberg	6	7^{7}
3	(United States) A Agassi	6	6
(Spain) F Clavet	3	3
(United States) R Reneberg	2	6	6
(Netherlands) J Eltingh	6	2	0
WC	(United States) J Connors	7	6
(United States) D Flach	5	4
(United States) A O'Brien	1	4
5	(United States) MV Washington	6	6

Second round
1	(United States) M Chang	6	7
(Brazil) L Mattar	3	5
Q	(Sweden) C Bergström	6	6
8	(Australia) J Stoltenberg	4	4
3	(United States) A Agassi	4	6	6
(United States) R Reneberg	6	2	4
WC	(United States) J Connors	4	6	1
5	(United States) MV Washington	6	3	6

Quarterfinals
1	(United States) M Chang	6	6
Q	(Sweden) C Bergström	1	3
3	(United States) A Agassi	4	5
5	(United States) MV Washington	6	7

Semifinals
1	(United States) M Chang	6	6
5	(United States) MV Washington	1	2

=== Bottom half ===
First round
6	(United States) B Gilbert	2	6	4
(United States) S Bryan	6	4	6
(Sweden) L Jönsson	2	7	6
(Argentina) F Davín	6	5	3
Q	(United States) W McGuire	4	6	6
(United States) B Shelton	6	3	4
(Uruguay) M Filippini	6	6
4	(United States) A Krickstein	4	2
7	(Sweden) M Pernfors	0	2
(Brazil) F Meligeni	6	6
WC	(Sweden) M Wilander	7	0	6
(South Africa) G Stafford	5	6	3
Q	(United States) B Dunn	6	1	6
(France) F Santoro	3	6	4
WC	(South Africa) H Herr	1	1
2	(United States) T Martin	6	6

Second round
(United States) S Bryan	3	2
(Sweden) L Jönsson	6	6
Q	(United States) W McGuire	6	7^{7}
(Uruguay) M Filippini	4	6^{3}
(Brazil) F Meligeni	6	5	5
WC	(Sweden) M Wilander	2	7	7
Q	(United States) B Dunn	3	2
2	(United States) T Martin	6	6

Quarterfinals
(Sweden) L Jönsson	3	2
Q	(United States) W McGuire	6	6
WC	(Sweden) M Wilander	3	6^{3}
2	(United States) T Martin	6	7^{7}

Semifinals
Q	(United States) W McGuire	2	6^{4}
2	(United States) T Martin	6	7^{7}
