= 1995 AT&T Challenge – Singles =

Singles
- 1995 AT&T Challenge

Final
- Champion: (United States) Michael Chang
- Runner-up: (United States) Andre Agassi
- Score: 6–2, 6–7^{(6–8)}, 6–4

Details
- Draw: 32 (3WC/4Q)
- Seeds: 8

Events
Singles	Doubles
← 1994 ·	Verizon Tennis Challenge	· 1996 →

Michael Chang successfully defended his title by defeating Andre Agassi 6–2, 6–7^{(6–8)}, 6–4 in the final.

== Seeds ==
1. (United States) Andre Agassi (final)
2. (United States) Michael Chang (champion)
3. (Sweden) Magnus Larsson (semifinals)
4. (United States) Todd Martin (semifinals)
5. (Australia) Jason Stoltenberg (first round)
6. (United States) Aaron Krickstein (second round)
7. (United States) MaliVai Washington (first round)
8. (United States) Chuck Adams (second round)

== Draw ==
=== Key ===
- Q = Qualifier
- WC = Wild card
- LL = Lucky loser
- Alt = Alternate
- SE = Special exempt
- PR = Protected ranking
- ITF = ITF entry
- JE = Junior exempt
- w/o = Walkover
- r = Retired
- d = Defaulted
- SR = Special ranking

=== Finals ===
Semifinals
1	(United States) Andre Agassi	6	6
3	(Sweden) Magnus Larsson	4	4
4	(United States) Todd Martin	3	0
2	(United States) Michael Chang	6	6

Final
1	(United States) Andre Agassi	2	7^{8}	4
2	(United States) Michael Chang	6	6^{6}	6

=== Top half ===
First round
1	(United States) A Agassi	6	6
(Australia) T Woodbridge	3	1
Q	(Brazil) R Jabali	2	6^{4}
(United States) V Spadea	6	7^{7}
(Norway) C Ruud	6	6
(Australia) M Tebbutt	4	3
(Morocco) K Alami	6^{2}	6	4
8	(United States) C Adams	7^{7}	4	6
3	(Sweden) M Larsson	7	6
Q	(Netherlands) J Winnink	5	2
(Switzerland) J Hlasek	6	5	6
(Venezuela) N Pereira	2	7	2
(Spain) E Sánchez	4	5
(Brazil) F Meligeni	6	7
WC	(Sweden) M Wilander	6	6
5	(Australia) J Stoltenberg	2	2

Second round
1	(United States) A Agassi	6	7
(United States) V Spadea	4	5
(Norway) C Ruud	6	6
8	(United States) C Adams	4	1
3	(Sweden) M Larsson	1	6	6
(Switzerland) J Hlasek	6	3	3
(Brazil) F Meligeni	3	6^{5}
WC	(Sweden) M Wilander	6	7^{7}

Quarterfinals
1	(United States) A Agassi	6	6
(Norway) C Ruud	4	4
3	(Sweden) M Larsson	6	3	6
WC	(Sweden) M Wilander	3	6	2

Semifinals
1	(United States) A Agassi	6	6
3	(Sweden) M Larsson	4	4

=== Bottom half ===
First round
6	(United States) A Krickstein	6	7
(United States) R Reneberg	3	5
(United States) B Shelton	1	2
(New Zealand) B Steven	6	6
WC	(United States) L Jensen	2	5
(Germany) K Braasch	6	7
Q	(Canada) A Sznajder	6^{6}	4
4	(United States) T Martin	7^{8}	6
7	(United States) MV Washington	4	6^{5}
(Spain) J Arrese	6	7^{7}
(Australia) J Morgan	6^{5}	4
(United States) J Palmer	7^{7}	6
WC	(United States) W McGuire	6	4	7
Q	(Spain) A Mancisidor	4	6	5
(Czech Republic) R Vašek	3	3
2	(United States) M Chang	6	6

Second round
6	(United States) A Krickstein	5	2
(New Zealand) B Steven	7	6
(Germany) K Braasch	2	2
4	(United States) T Martin	6	6
(Spain) J Arrese	6	5	6
(United States) J Palmer	3	7	3
WC	(United States) W McGuire	1	2
2	(United States) M Chang	6	6

Quarterfinals
(New Zealand) B Steven	5	6^{8}
4	(United States) T Martin	7	7^{10}
(Spain) J Arrese	5	3
2	(United States) M Chang	7	6

Semifinals
4	(United States) T Martin	3	0
2	(United States) M Chang	6	6
