= 1998 AT&T Challenge =

- Date: April 27 – May 3
- Edition: 13th
- Category: World Series
- Draw: 32S / 16D
- Prize money: $315,000
- Surface: Clay / outdoor
- Location: Atlanta, Georgia, United States

Champions

Singles
- (United States) Pete Sampras

Doubles
- (South Africa) Ellis Ferreira / (South Africa) Brent Haygarth
← 1997 ·	AT&T Challenge	· 1999 →

The 1998 AT&T Challenge was a men's tennis tournament played on Clay in Atlanta, Georgia, United States that was part of the World Series of the 1998 ATP Tour. It was the thirteenth edition of the tournament and was held from April 27 through May 3, 1998. First-seeded Pete Sampras won the singles title.

== Finals ==
=== Singles ===
(United States) Pete Sampras defeated (Australia) Jason Stoltenberg, 6–7^{(2–7)}, 6–3, 7–6^{(7–4)}

- It was Sampras' 2nd singles title of the year and the 54th of his career.

=== Doubles ===
(South Africa) Ellis Ferreira / (South Africa) Brent Haygarth defeated (United States) Alex O'Brien / (United States) Richey Reneberg, 6–3, 0–6, 6–2
