= 1995 AT&T Challenge – Doubles =

Doubles
- 1995 AT&T Challenge

Final
- Champions: (Spain) Sergio Casal (Spain) Emilio Sánchez
- Runners-up: (United States) Jared Palmer (United States) Richey Reneberg
- Score: 6–7, 6–3, 7–6

Details
- Draw: 16 (3WC/1Q)
- Seeds: 4

Events
Singles	Doubles
← 1994 ·	Verizon Tennis Challenge	· 1996 →

Jared Palmer and Richey Reneberg were the defending champions, but lost in the final to Sergio Casal and Emilio Sánchez. The score was 6–7, 6–3, 7–6.

== Seeds ==
1. (New Zealand) Brett Steven / (Australia) Todd Woodbridge (semifinals)
2. (United States) Jared Palmer / (United States) Richey Reneberg (final)
3. (United States) Alex O'Brien / (Australia) Sandon Stolle (quarterfinals)
4. (Spain) Sergio Casal / (Spain) Emilio Sánchez (champions)

== Draw ==
=== Key ===
- Q = Qualifier
- WC = Wild card
- LL = Lucky loser
- Alt = Alternate
- SE = Special exempt
- PR = Protected ranking
- ITF = ITF entry
- JE = Junior exempt
- w/o = Walkover
- r = Retired
- d = Defaulted
- SR = Special ranking

=== Draw ===
First round
1	(New Zealand) B Steven (Australia) T Woodbridge	5	6	6
(United States) L Jensen (United States) M Jensen	7	2	3
WC	(United States) K Flach (United States) R Seguso	6	6
(Australia) A Florent (Netherlands) J Winnink	2	4
4	(Spain) S Casal (Spain) E Sánchez	6	6
WC	(United States) Dan Granot (Australia) P Lloyd	2	4
WC	(Uruguay) D Pérez (Sweden) M Wilander	7	3	2
(Sweden) R Bergh (Sweden) M Larsson	6	6	6
(United States) M Keil (United States) D Randall	6	6
(United States) G Van Emburgh (United States) J Waite	4	4
Q	(United States) W McGuire (United States) TJ Middleton	4	4
3	(United States) A O'Brien (Australia) S Stolle	6	6
(Austria) A Antonitsch (Switzerland) J Hlasek	6	5	7
(United States) K Kinnear (United States) K Thorne	3	7	6
(South Africa) E Ferreira (South Africa) B Haygarth	2	2
2	(United States) J Palmer (United States) R Reneberg	6	6

Quarterfinals
1	(New Zealand) B Steven (Australia) T Woodbridge	4	7	6
WC	(United States) K Flach (United States) R Seguso	6	6	2
4	(Spain) S Casal (Spain) E Sánchez	6	5	6
(Sweden) R Bergh (Sweden) M Larsson	3	7	4
(United States) M Keil (United States) D Randall	5	7	6
3	(United States) A O'Brien (Australia) S Stolle	7	6	1
(Austria) A Antonitsch (Switzerland) J Hlasek	3	4
2	(United States) J Palmer (United States) R Reneberg	6	6

Semifinals
1	(New Zealand) B Steven (Australia) T Woodbridge	4	4
4	(Spain) S Casal (Spain) E Sánchez	6	6
(United States) M Keil (United States) D Randall	6	4
2	(United States) J Palmer (United States) R Reneberg	7	6

Final
4	(Spain) S Casal (Spain) E Sánchez	6	6	7
2	(United States) J Palmer (United States) R Reneberg	7	3	6
