= 1997 AT&T Challenge – Singles =

Singles
- 1997 AT&T Challenge

Final
- Champion: (Uruguay) Marcelo Filippini
- Runner-up: (Australia) Jason Stoltenberg
- Score: 7–6^{(7–2)}, 6–4

Details
- Draw: 32 (3WC/4Q)
- Seeds: 8

Events
Singles	Doubles
← 1996 ·	Verizon Tennis Challenge	· 1998 →

Karim Alami was the defending champion but chose to compete at Munich during the same week, losing at the second round.

Marcelo Filippini won the title by defeating Jason Stoltenberg 7–6^{(7–2)}, 6–4 in the final.

== Seeds ==
1. (United States) Michael Chang (first round)
2. (Sweden) Jonas Björkman (second round)
3. (United States) Jim Courier (first round)
4. (United States) Andre Agassi (second round)
5. (Czech Republic) Petr Korda (quarterfinals)
6. (United States) Alex O'Brien (second round)
7. (Australia) Jason Stoltenberg (final)
8. (United States) Chris Woodruff (semifinals)

== Draw ==
=== Key ===
- Q = Qualifier
- WC = Wild card
- LL = Lucky loser
- Alt = Alternate
- SE = Special exempt
- PR = Protected ranking
- ITF = ITF entry
- JE = Junior exempt
- w/o = Walkover
- r = Retired
- d = Defaulted
- SR = Special ranking

=== Finals ===
Semifinals
7	(Australia) Jason Stoltenberg	6	5	6
(Sweden) Magnus Norman	4	7	3
(Uruguay) Marcelo Filippini	7	3	6
8	(United States) Chris Woodruff	5	6	4

Final
7	(Australia) Jason Stoltenberg	6^{2}	4
(Uruguay) Marcelo Filippini	7^{7}	6

=== Top half ===
First round
1	(United States) M Chang	6	3	4
(Brazil) F Meligeni	2	6	6
(Netherlands) D van Scheppingen	6	6
(Sweden) N Kulti	3	3
(Spain) JA Viloca	6	6
(Argentina) M Zabaleta	3	2
(Zimbabwe) B Black	6	3	4
7	(Australia) J Stoltenberg	2	6	6
4	(United States) A Agassi	6	6
Q	(Brazil) J Oncins	3	2
(Sweden) P Fredriksson	3	0
(Sweden) M Norman	6	6
(South Africa) G Stafford	3	5
(Belgium) J Van Herck	6	7
WC	(Mexico) A Hernández	5	2
5	(Czech Republic) P Korda	7	6

Second round
(Brazil) F Meligeni	6	7^{7}
(Netherlands) D van Scheppingen	3	6^{1}
(Spain) JA Viloca	1	5
7	(Australia) J Stoltenberg	6	7
4	(United States) A Agassi	6^{7}	6	3
(Sweden) M Norman	7^{9}	3	6
(Belgium) J Van Herck	4	6	3
5	(Czech Republic) P Korda	6	1	6

Quarterfinals
(Brazil) F Meligeni	1^{r}
7	(Australia) J Stoltenberg	3
(Sweden) M Norman	6	6
5	(Czech Republic) P Korda	4	4

Semifinals
7	(Australia) J Stoltenberg	6	5	6
(Sweden) M Norman	4	7	3

=== Bottom half ===
First round
6	(United States) A O'Brien	7	3	6
WC	(United States) B Shelton	5	6	3
(Uruguay) M Filippini	6	7^{7}
(United States) V Spadea	4	6^{3}
(Austria) G Schaller	6	6
WC	(United States) C Humphries	0	3
Q	(United States) S Campbell	2	6	6
3	(United States) J Courier	6	4	3
8	(United States) C Woodruff	6	6
(Denmark) K Carlsen	2	2
Q	(Belgium) K Goossens	1	2
(Argentina) J Frana	6	6
(Australia) S Stolle	6	6
Q	(France) J Hanquez	3	2
(Armenia) S Sargsian	6	3	4
2	(Sweden) J Björkman	3	6	6

Second round
6	(United States) A O'Brien	6^{6}	4
(Uruguay) M Filippini	7^{8}	6
(Austria) G Schaller	6	4	6
Q	(United States) S Campbell	3	6	1
8	(United States) C Woodruff	7^{7}	6
(Argentina) J Frana	6^{2}	2
(Australia) S Stolle	4	7^{7}	6
2	(Sweden) J Björkman	6	6^{2}	2

Quarterfinals
(Uruguay) M Filippini	6	6
(Austria) G Schaller	1	2
8	(United States) C Woodruff	6	4	6
(Australia) S Stolle	1	6	3

Semifinals
(Uruguay) M Filippini	7	3	6
8	(United States) C Woodruff	5	6	4
