= 1999 AT&T Challenge – Doubles =

Doubles
- 1999 AT&T Challenge

Final
- Champions: (United States) Patrick Galbraith (United States) Justin Gimelstob
- Runners-up: (Australia) Todd Woodbridge (Australia) Mark Woodforde
- Score: 5–7, 7–6^{(7–4)}, 6–3

Details
- Draw: 16
- Seeds: 4

Events
Singles	Doubles
← 1998 ·	AT&T Challenge	· 2000 →

The 1999 AT&T Challenge was a men's tennis tournament played on Clay in Atlanta, Georgia, United States that was part of the World Series of the 1999 ATP Tour. It was the fourteenth edition of the tournament and was held from 26 April – 2 May 1999.

== Seeds ==
Champion seeds are indicated in bold text while text in italics indicates the round in which those seeds were eliminated.

1. (Australia) Todd Woodbridge / (Australia) Mark Woodforde (final)
2. (United States) **Patrick Galbraith** / (United States) **Justin Gimelstob (champions)**
3. (South Africa) Ellis Ferreira / (South Africa) Brent Haygarth (semifinals)
4. (Sweden) Nicklas Kulti / (Sweden) Mikael Tillström (first round)

== Draw ==
=== Key ===
- Q = Qualifier
- WC = Wild card
- LL = Lucky loser
- Alt = Alternate
- SE = Special exempt
- PR = Protected ranking
- ITF = ITF entry
- JE = Junior exempt
- w/o = Walkover
- r = Retired
- d = Defaulted
- SR = Special ranking

=== Finals ===
First round
1	(Australia) **T Woodbridge** **(Australia) M Woodforde**	**6**	**6**
(United States) J-M Gambill (United States) T Gambill	2	4
(Argentina) **L Arnold** **(Argentina) M Hood**	**6**	**6**
(Australia) P Kilderry (Australia) S Stolle	4	4
3	(South Africa) **E Ferreira** **(South Africa) B Haygarth**	**6**	**6**
(South Africa) L Bale (South Africa) G Stafford	1	2
(United States) **R Reneberg** **(United States) J Stark**	**6**	**6**
(United States) A Janasik (United States) P Mancini	4	1
(Argentina) **D del Río** **(Brazil) J Oncins**	6	**7**	**6**
(United States) B Coupe (The Bahamas) M Merklein	**7**	6	4
(United States) **S Humphries** **(United States) T Martin**	**6**	3	**6**
4	(Sweden) N Kulti (Sweden) M Tillström	4	**6**	3
(Australia) **M Tebbutt** **(United States) J Waite**	3	**7**	**7**
(Mexico) D Roditi (South Africa) P Rosner	**6**	6	6
2	(United States) **P Galbraith** **(United States) J Gimelstob**	**6**	**7**
(United States) D Flach (United States) B MacPhie	3	6

Quarterfinals
1	(Australia) **T Woodbridge** **(Australia) M Woodforde**	**7**	**7**
(Argentina) L Arnold (Argentina) M Hood	5	5
3	(South Africa) **E Ferreira** **(South Africa) B Haygarth**	**7**	**6**
(United States) R Reneberg (United States) J Stark	6	3
(Argentina) D del Río (Brazil) J Oncins	3	5
(United States) **S Humphries** **(United States) T Martin**	**6**	**7**
(Australia) M Tebbutt (United States) J Waite	**6**	5	3
2	(United States) **P Galbraith** **(United States) J Gimelstob**	3	**7**	**6**

Semifinals
1	(Australia) **T Woodbridge** **(Australia) M Woodforde**	**7**	**7**
3	(South Africa) E Ferreira (South Africa) B Haygarth	5	6
(United States) S Humphries (United States) T Martin	5	**7**	5
2	(United States) **P Galbraith** **(United States) J Gimelstob**	**7**	6	**7**

Final
1	(Australia) T Woodbridge (Australia) M Woodforde	**7**	6	3
2	(United States) **P Galbraith** **(United States) J Gimelstob**	5	**7**	**6**
