= 2010 Banja Luka Challenger – Doubles =

Doubles
- 2010 Banja Luka Challenger

Final
- Champions: (United States) James Cerretani (Czech Republic) David Škoch
- Runners-up: (Canada) Adil Shamasdin (Croatia) Lovro Zovko
- Score: 6–1, 6–4

Events
Singles	Doubles
← 2009 ·	Banja Luka Challenger	· 2011 →

Dustin Brown and Rainer Eitzinger were the defending champions, but decided not to start this year.
James Cerretani and David Škoch defeated Adil Shamasdin and Lovro Zovko 6–1, 6–4 to win the tournament.

== Seeds ==
1. (Canada) Adil Shamasdin / (Croatia) Lovro Zovko (final)
2. (United States) James Cerretani / (Czech Republic) David Škoch (champions)
3. (Spain) Pere Riba / (Spain) Gabriel Trujillo-Soler (semifinals)
4. (Austria) Max Raditschnigg / (Italy) Simone Vagnozzi (first round)

== Draw ==
=== Key ===
- Q = Qualifier
- WC = Wild card
- LL = Lucky loser
- Alt = Alternate
- SE = Special exempt
- PR = Protected ranking
- ITF = ITF entry
- JE = Junior exempt
- w/o = Walkover
- r = Retired
- d = Defaulted
- SR = Special ranking

=== Draw ===
First round
1	(Canada) A Shamasdin (Croatia) L Zovko	6	6
(Romania) C Gârd (United Kingdom) D Inglot	3	4
(Croatia) N Mektić (Croatia) A Veić	3	6	[10]
(Croatia) F Škugor (Croatia) I Zovko	6	3	[3]
3	(Spain) P Riba (Spain) G Trujillo-Soler	7	6
(Slovakia) M Semjan (Russia) D Sitak	5	2
(Hungary) A Balázs (Czech Republic) J Pospíšil	4	6	[10]
(Spain) G Alcaide (Spain) P Santos	6	2	[7]
WC	(Croatia) R Karanušić (Serbia) V Obradović	0	4
(Spain) A Menéndez-Maceiras (Belgium) C Rochus	6	6
WC	(Serbia) N Čačić (Serbia) M Djokovic	6	6
4	(Austria) M Raditschnigg (Italy) S Vagnozzi	2	2
(Spain) G Olaso (Serbia) D Savić	5	1
(Spain) I Navarro (Spain) R Ramírez Hidalgo	7	6
WC	(Israel) A Hadad (Serbia) F Krajinović	4	6^{7}
2	(United States) J Cerretani (Czech Republic) D Škoch	6	7

Quarterfinals
1	(Canada) A Shamasdin (Croatia) L Zovko
(Croatia) N Mektić (Croatia) A Veić	w/o
3	(Spain) P Riba (Spain) G Trujillo-Soler	6^{5}	6	[10]
(Spain) G Alcaide (Spain) P Santos	7	4	[8]
(Spain) A Menéndez-Maceiras (Belgium) C Rochus	6	2	[10]
WC	(Serbia) N Čačić (Serbia) M Djokovic	1	6	[3]
(Spain) I Navarro (Spain) R Ramírez Hidalgo	3	0
2	(United States) J Cerretani (Czech Republic) D Škoch	6	6

Semifinals
1	(Canada) A Shamasdin (Croatia) L Zovko	2	7	[10]
3	(Spain) P Riba (Spain) G Trujillo-Soler	6	5	[7]
(Spain) A Menéndez-Maceiras (Belgium) C Rochus	2	2
2	(United States) J Cerretani (Czech Republic) D Škoch	6	6

Finals
1	(Canada) A Shamasdin (Croatia) L Zovko	1	4
2	(United States) J Cerretani (Czech Republic) D Škoch	6	6
