= 1997 Paegas Czech Open – Doubles =

Doubles
- 1997 Paegas Czech Open

Final
- Champions: (India) Mahesh Bhupathi (India) Leander Paes
- Runners-up: (Czech Republic) Petr Luxa (Czech Republic) David Škoch
- Score: 6–1, 6–1

Events
Singles	Doubles
← 1996 ·	Prague Open	· 1998 →

The 1997 Paegas Czech Open was a men's tennis tournament played on Clay in Prague, Czech Republic that was part of the International Series of the 1997 ATP Tour. Yevgeny Kafelnikov and Daniel Vacek were the defending champions, but lost in the first round to Petr Luxa and David Škoch.

Mahesh Bhupathi and Leander Paes won the title by defeating Luxa and Škoch 6–1, 6–1 in the final.

== Seeds ==
1. (Russia) Yevgeny Kafelnikov / (Czech Republic) Daniel Vacek (first round)
2. (Belgium) Libor Pimek / (South Africa) Byron Talbot (quarterfinals)
3. (n/a)
4. (United Kingdom) Neil Broad / (South Africa) Piet Norval (quarterfinals)

== Draw ==
=== Key ===
- Q = Qualifier
- WC = Wild card
- LL = Lucky loser
- Alt = Alternate
- ITF = ITF entry
- PR = Protected ranking
- SR = Special ranking
- SE = Special exempt
- JE = Junior exempt
- JR = Junior Accelerator Programme entrant
- CO = College Accelerator Programme entrant
- NG = Next Gen Accelerator Program entrant
- w/o = Walkover
- r = Retired
- d = Defaulted

=== Draw ===
First round
1	(Russia) Y Kafelnikov (Czech Republic) D Vacek	3	6	6
WC	(Czech Republic) P Luxa (Czech Republic) D Škoch	6	4	7
(South Africa) M Barnard (United States) J Waite	6	3	6
(Australia) W Arthurs (Netherlands) S Noteboom	3	6	2
4	(United Kingdom) N Broad (South Africa) P Norval	7	6
(Brazil) G Kuerten (Ecuador) N Lapentti	6	2
Q	(Czech Republic) R Štěpánek (Czech Republic) M Tabara	1	4
(Spain) T Carbonell (Spain) F Roig	6	6
WC	(Chile) M Ríos (Czech Republic) B Ulihrach	7	6
(Czech Republic) D Rikl (Czech Republic) P Vízner	6	3
(India) M Bhupathi (India) L Paes	6	6
LL	(Romania) A Pavel (Israel) E Ran	3	1
(United States) D Johnson (France) F Santoro	6	6
WC	(Latvia) Ģ Dzelde (Austria) U Plamberger	2	0
(United States) J Palmer (South Africa) C van Rensburg	2	2
2	(Belgium) L Pimek (South Africa) B Talbot	6	6

Quarterfinals
WC	(Czech Republic) P Luxa (Czech Republic) D Škoch	6	6
(South Africa) M Barnard (United States) J Waite	4	4
4	(United Kingdom) N Broad (South Africa) P Norval	6	5	3
(Spain) T Carbonell (Spain) F Roig	2	7	6
WC	(Chile) M Ríos (Czech Republic) B Ulihrach	1	4
(India) M Bhupathi (India) L Paes	6	6
(United States) D Johnson (France) F Santoro	6	6	6
2	(Belgium) L Pimek (South Africa) B Talbot	2	7	4

Semifinals
WC	(Czech Republic) P Luxa (Czech Republic) D Škoch	6	1	6
(Spain) T Carbonell (Spain) F Roig	4	6	3
(India) M Bhupathi (India) L Paes	6	6
(United States) D Johnson (France) F Santoro	4	1

Final
WC	(Czech Republic) P Luxa (Czech Republic) D Škoch	1	1
(India) M Bhupathi (India) L Paes	6	6
