= 1992 AT&T Challenge – Doubles =

Doubles
- 1992 AT&T Challenge

Final
- Champions: (United States) Steve DeVries (Australia) David Macpherson
- Runners-up: (United States) Mark Keil (United States) Dave Randall
- Score: 6–3, 6–3

Details
- Draw: 16 (1WC/1Q)
- Seeds: 4

Events
Singles	Doubles
← 1991 ·	Verizon Tennis Challenge	· 1993 →

Luke Jensen and Scott Melville were the defending champions, but none competed this year.

Steve DeVries and David Macpherson won the title by defeating Mark Keil and Dave Randall 6–3, 6–3 in the final.

== Seeds ==
1. (United States) Ken Flach / (United States) Todd Witsken (quarterfinals)
2. (United States) Scott Davis / (United States) David Pate (first round)
3. (United States) Steve DeVries / (Australia) David Macpherson (champions)
4. (Netherlands) Jacco Eltingh / (Netherlands) Tom Kempers (semifinals)

== Draw ==
=== Key ===
- Q = Qualifier
- WC = Wild card
- LL = Lucky loser
- Alt = Alternate
- SE = Special exempt
- PR = Protected ranking
- ITF = ITF entry
- JE = Junior exempt
- w/o = Walkover
- r = Retired
- d = Defaulted
- SR = Special ranking

=== Draw ===
First round
1	(United States) K Flach (United States) T Witsken	6	6
(Commonwealth of Independent States) A Olhovskiy (South Africa) B Talbot	3	3
(United States) B Garnett (South Africa) S Kruger	6	7	1
(United States) M Keil (United States) D Randall	7	5	6
4	(Netherlands) J Eltingh (Netherlands) T Kempers	6	6
(United States) B Garrow (Australia) M Woodforde	2	4
(United States) B Gilbert (United States) J Stark	3	6	6
WC	(United States) T Gullikson (United States) P Sampras	6	1	1
Q	(Argentina) P Albano (Argentina) H de la Peña	6	6
(Brazil) R Acioly (Brazil) L Mattar	2	4
(United States) C Beckman (United States) J Brown	7	4	3
3	(United States) S DeVries (Australia) D Macpherson	6	6	6
(United States) S Cannon (United States) G Van Emburgh	3	4
(United States) B Shelton (United States) K Thorne	6	6
(United States) M Briggs (United States) T Kronemann	2	6	7
2	(United States) S Davis (United States) D Pate	6	3	5

Quarterfinals
1	(United States) K Flach (United States) T Witsken	7	4	3
(United States) M Keil (United States) D Randall	6	6	6
4	(Netherlands) J Eltingh (Netherlands) T Kempers	6	6
(United States) B Gilbert (United States) J Stark	2	2
Q	(Argentina) P Albano (Argentina) H de la Peña	1	7	0
3	(United States) S DeVries (Australia) D Macpherson	6	6	6
(United States) B Shelton (United States) K Thorne	4	4
(United States) M Briggs (United States) T Kronemann	6	6

Semifinals
(United States) M Keil (United States) D Randall	3	6	7
4	(Netherlands) J Eltingh (Netherlands) T Kempers	6	1	6
3	(United States) S DeVries (Australia) D Macpherson	6	6	6
(United States) M Briggs (United States) T Kronemann	7	3	3

Final
(United States) M Keil (United States) D Randall	3	3
3	(United States) S DeVries (Australia) D Macpherson	6	6
