= 1994 AT&T Challenge – Doubles =

Doubles
- 1994 AT&T Challenge

Final
- Champions: (United States) Jared Palmer (United States) Richey Reneberg
- Runners-up: (United States) Francisco Montana (United States) Jim Pugh
- Score: 4–6, 7–6, 6–4

Details
- Draw: 16
- Seeds: 4

Events
Singles	Doubles
← 1993 ·	Verizon Tennis Challenge	· 1995 →

Paul Annacone and Richey Reneberg were the defending champions, but competed this year with different partners.

Reneberg teamed up with Jared Palmer and successfully defended his title, by defeating Francisco Montana and Jim Pugh 4–6, 7–6, 6–4 in the final.

Annacone teamed up with Doug Flach and lost in the semifinals to Palmer and Reneberg.

== Seeds ==
1. (United States) Jared Palmer / (United States) Richey Reneberg (champions)
2. (United States) Luke Jensen / (United States) Murphy Jensen (first round, retired)
3. (United States) Ken Flach / (United States) Rick Leach (first round)
4. (United States) Brad Pearce / (United States) Dave Randall (quarterfinals)

== Draw ==
=== Key ===
- Q = Qualifier
- WC = Wild card
- LL = Lucky loser
- Alt = Alternate
- SE = Special exempt
- PR = Protected ranking
- ITF = ITF entry
- JE = Junior exempt
- w/o = Walkover
- r = Retired
- d = Defaulted
- SR = Special ranking

=== Draw ===
First round
1	(United States) J Palmer (United States) R Reneberg	6	6
WC	(United States) B Gilbert (United States) MV Washington	4	3
(United States) S DeVries (United States) A O'Brien	6	3	6
WC	(United States) A Agassi (United States) J Connors	4	6	2
3	(United States) K Flach (United States) R Leach	1	6
(United States) P Annacone (United States) D Flach	6	7
(Argentina) P Albano (South Africa) E Ferreira	6	7
(United States) D Johnson (United States) G Van Emburgh	4	5
Q	(South Africa) L Bale (South Africa) G Stafford	6	6
(Argentina) J Garat (Brazil) J Oncins	1	4
(South Africa) C van Rensburg (Australia) T Woodbridge	5	6
4	(United States) B Pearce (United States) D Randall	7	7
(United States) M Briggs (United States) B Devening	4	3
(United States) B MacPhie (United States) B Shelton	6	6
(United States) F Montana (United States) J Pugh	7
2	(United States) L Jensen (United States) M Jensen	5	r

Quarterfinals
1	(United States) J Palmer (United States) R Reneberg	6	6
(United States) S DeVries (United States) A O'Brien	1	3
(United States) P Annacone (United States) D Flach	6	6
(Argentina) P Albano (South Africa) E Ferreira	4	3
Q	(South Africa) L Bale (South Africa) G Stafford	6	6	6
4	(United States) B Pearce (United States) D Randall	0	7	3
(United States) B MacPhie (United States) B Shelton	6	3	6
(United States) F Montana (United States) J Pugh	3	6	7

Semifinals
1	(United States) J Palmer (United States) R Reneberg	6	4	7
(United States) P Annacone (United States) D Flach	0	6	6
Q	(South Africa) L Bale (South Africa) G Stafford	4	5
(United States) F Montana (United States) J Pugh	6	7

Final
1	(United States) J Palmer (United States) R Reneberg	4	7	6
(United States) F Montana (United States) J Pugh	6	6	4
