= 1993 AT&T Challenge – Doubles =

Doubles
- 1993 AT&T Challenge

Final
- Champions: (United States) Paul Annacone (United States) Richey Reneberg
- Runners-up: (United States) Todd Martin (United States) Jared Palmer
- Score: 6–4, 7–6

Details
- Draw: 16 (2WC/1Q)
- Seeds: 4

Events
Singles	Doubles
← 1992 ·	Verizon Tennis Challenge	· 1994 →

Steve DeVries and David Macpherson were the defending champions, but lost in the first round to Todd Martin and Jared Palmer.

Paul Annacone and Richey Reneberg won the title by defeating Martin and Palmer 6–4, 7–6 in the final.

== Seeds ==
1. (United States) Steve DeVries / (Australia) David Macpherson (first round)
2. (United States) Ken Flach / (United States) Rick Leach (quarterfinals)
3. (United States) Mark Keil / (United States) Dave Randall (first round)
4. (United States) Mike Briggs / (United States) Trevor Kronemann (semifinals)

== Draw ==
=== Key ===
- Q = Qualifier
- WC = Wild card
- LL = Lucky loser
- Alt = Alternate
- SE = Special exempt
- PR = Protected ranking
- ITF = ITF entry
- JE = Junior exempt
- w/o = Walkover
- r = Retired
- d = Defaulted
- SR = Special ranking

=== Draw ===
First round
1	(United States) S DeVries (Australia) D Macpherson	6	2
(United States) T Martin (United States) J Palmer	7	6
(United States) S Davis (United States) K Jones	7	4	4
(United States) B Devening (The Bahamas) M Knowles	6	6	6
3	(United States) M Keil (United States) D Randall	7	4	4
WC	(United States) B Gilbert (United States) R Seguso	6	6	6
WC	(United States) J Connors (Sweden) M Wilander	6	1	4
(Argentina) P Albano (Uruguay) D Pérez	4	6	6
(United States) TJ Middleton (United States) B Shelton	3	6	3
(South Africa) R Deppe (Venezuela) N Pereira	6	3	6
(United States) B Joelson (United States) T Nelson	4	7	6
4	(United States) M Briggs (United States) T Kronemann	6	5	7
(Netherlands) J Eltingh (Mexico) L Lavalle	3	4
(United States) P Annacone (United States) R Reneberg	6	6
Q	(Sweden) M Renström (Sweden) N Utgren	7	2	1
2	(United States) K Flach (United States) R Leach	6	6	6

Quarterfinals
(United States) T Martin (United States) J Palmer	3	7	6
(United States) B Devening (The Bahamas) M Knowles	6	6	3
WC	(United States) B Gilbert (United States) R Seguso	7	6
(Argentina) P Albano (Uruguay) D Pérez	6	4
(South Africa) R Deppe (Venezuela) N Pereira	3	4
4	(United States) M Briggs (United States) T Kronemann	6	6
(United States) P Annacone (United States) R Reneberg	6	6
2	(United States) K Flach (United States) R Leach	4	4

Semifinals
(United States) T Martin (United States) J Palmer	7	6
WC	(United States) B Gilbert (United States) R Seguso	6	3
4	(United States) M Briggs (United States) T Kronemann	6	4	4
(United States) P Annacone (United States) R Reneberg	4	6	6

Final
(United States) T Martin (United States) J Palmer	4	6
(United States) P Annacone (United States) R Reneberg	6	7
