= 1995 AT&T Challenge =

Tennis tournament

- Date: 1–7 May
- Edition: 11th
- Category: World Series
- Draw: 32S / 16D
- Prize money: $303,000
- Surface: Clay / outdoor
- Location: Johns Creek, Georgia, U.S.
- Venue: Atlanta Athletic Club

Champions

Singles
- (United States) Michael Chang

Doubles
- (Spain) Sergio Casal / (Spain) Emilio Sánchez
← 1994 ·	AT&T Challenge	· 1996 →

The 1995 AT&T Challenge was an ATP men's tennis tournament held in Atlanta, Georgia, United States that was part of the World Series of the 1995 ATP Tour. It was the 11th edition of the tournament and was held from May 1 through May 7, 1995. Second-seeded Michael Chang won his second consecutive singles title at the event.

== Finals ==
=== Singles ===
(United States) Michael Chang defeated (United States) Andre Agassi, 6–2, 6–7^{(6–8)}, 6–4

- It was Chang's 2nd singles title of the year and 21st of his career.

=== Doubles ===
(Spain) Sergio Casal / (Spain) Emilio Sánchez defeated (United States) Jared Palmer / (United States) Richey Reneberg 6–7, 6–3, 7–6
