= 1996 AT&T Challenge – Singles =

Singles
- 1996 AT&T Challenge

Final
- Champion: (Morocco) Karim Alami
- Runner-up: (Sweden) Nicklas Kulti
- Score: 6–3, 6–4

Details
- Draw: 32
- Seeds: 8

Events
Singles	Doubles
← 1995 ·	AT&T Challenge	· 1997 →

Michael Chang was the defending champion but lost in the semifinals to Karim Alami.

Alami won in the final 6–3, 6–4 against Nicklas Kulti. This was the last tournament of Jimmy Connors career, and he lost to Richey Reneberg in the first round.

== Seeds ==
A champion seed is indicated in bold text while text in italics indicates the round in which that seed was eliminated.

1. (United States) Michael Chang (semifinals)
2. (United States) Richey Reneberg (semifinals)
3. (Argentina) Javier Frana (quarterfinals)
4. (United States) Michael Joyce (first round)
5. (Sweden) Jonas Björkman (second round)
6. (Morocco) **Karim Alami (champion)**
7. (Sweden) Mats Wilander (first round)
8. (United States) Chris Woodruff (first round)

== Draw ==
=== Key ===
- Q = Qualifier
- WC = Wild card
- LL = Lucky loser
- Alt = Alternate
- SE = Special exempt
- PR = Protected ranking
- ITF = ITF entry
- JE = Junior exempt
- w/o = Walkover
- r = Retired
- d = Defaulted
- SR = Special ranking

First round
1	(United States) **M Chang**	**6**	**6**
Q	(United States) M Sell	3	4
(Sweden) J Apell	3	4
(Australia) **M Tebbutt**	**6**	**6**
(Brazil) **F Meligeni**	**6**	**7^{7}**
(United States) J Palmer	2	6^{5}
(Australia) **R Fromberg**	**6**	**6**
7	(Sweden) M Wilander	3	4
3	(Argentina) **J Frana**	**7^{7}**	3	**6**
(Uruguay) M Filippini	6^{2}	**6**	4
(Belgium) **K Goossens**	0	**6**	**6**
(Argentina) G Etlis	**6**	4	4
Q	(Australia) G Doyle	5	2
(Australia) **S Stolle**	**7**	**6**
(Ecuador) L Morejón	6^{2}	4
6	(Morocco) **K Alami**	**7^{7}**	**6**
5	(Sweden) **J Björkman**	**6**	**7^{7}**
Q	(Germany) O Gross	4	6^{4}
(United States) **V Spadea**	**6**	**6**
(Italy) G Pozzi	1	4
(Australia) **S Draper**	**7^{9}**	**6**
(Australia) P Rafter	6^{7}	4
(Sweden) **N Kulti**	**7^{7}**	3	**6**
4	(United States) M Joyce	6^{5}	**6**	1
8	(United States) C Woodruff	3	**6**	3
Q	(United States) **B Shelton**	**6**	2	**6**
LL	(France) **D Courcol**	**6**	**6**
WC	(United States) L Jensen	4	2
WC	(United States) **D Wheaton**	**7^{7}**	3	**6**
(The Bahamas) M Knowles	6^{2}	**6**	3
WC	(United States) J Connors	2	**6**	1
2	(United States) **R Reneberg**	**6**	3	**6**

Second round
1	(United States) **M Chang**	**6**	**6**
(Australia) M Tebbutt	1	2
(Brazil) **F Meligeni**	3	**6**	**6**
(Australia) R Fromberg	**6**	2	2
3	(Argentina) **J Frana**	**6**	**6**
(Belgium) K Goossens	3	4
(Australia) S Stolle	4	2
6	(Morocco) **K Alami**	**6**	**6**
5	(Sweden) J Björkman	5	**6**	3
(United States) **V Spadea**	**7**	2	**6**
(Australia) S Draper	4	6^{4}
(Sweden) **N Kulti**	**6**	**7^{7}**
Q	(United States) **B Shelton**	**6**	**6**
LL	(France) D Courcol	3	1
WC	(United States) D Wheaton	4	2
2	(United States) **R Reneberg**	**6**	**6**

Quarterfinals
1	(United States) **M Chang**	**6**	**7**
(Brazil) F Meligeni	1	5
3	(Argentina) J Frana	**6**	6^{4}	2
6	(Morocco) **K Alami**	3	**7^{7}**	**6**
(United States) V Spadea	6^{0}	6^{3}
(Sweden) **N Kulti**	**7^{7}**	**7^{7}**
Q	(United States) B Shelton	6^{9}	**6**	5
2	(United States) **R Reneberg**	**7^{11}**	3	**7**

Semifinals
1	(United States) M Chang	4	4
6	(Morocco) **K Alami**	**6**	**6**
(Sweden) **N Kulti**	6^{5}	**7^{8}**	**6**
2	(United States) R Reneberg	**7^{7}**	6^{6}	2

Final
6	(Morocco) **Karim Alami**	**6**	**6**
(Sweden) Nicklas Kulti	3	4
