= Tapio Nurminen =

Finnish tennis player

- Country (sports): Finland
- Born: 12 October 1975 (age 49); Imatra, Finland
- Plays: Right-handed
- Prize money: $67,872

Singles
- Career record: 0-1 (ATP Tour)
- Highest ranking: No. 212 (17 August 1998)

Grand Slam singles results
- French Open: Q1 (1998)
- US Open: Q1 (2001)

Doubles
- Highest ranking: No. 262 (6 March 2000)

Tapio Nurminen (born 12 October 1975) is a Finnish former professional tennis player.

Born in Imatra, Nurminen reached a career high singles ranking of 212 while competing on the professional tour, in a career which included making the qualifying draws of the French Open and US Open. His only ATP Tour main draw appearance came at the 1998 Prague Open, where he lost his first round match in three sets to Martin Sinner. Between 1994 and 2001 he was an occasional Davis Cup player for Finland, featuring in a total of five ties. He won his only Davis Cup singles rubber against Vincenzo Santopadre in 2001.

== See also ==
- List of Finland Davis Cup team representatives
