= 1996 AT&T Challenge – Doubles =

Doubles
- 1996 AT&T Challenge
- 1995 Champions: (Spain) Sergio Casal (Spain) Emilio Sánchez

Final
- Champions: (South Africa) Christo van Rensburg (United States) David Wheaton
- Runners-up: (United States) Bill Behrens (United States) Matt Lucena
- Score: 7–6, 6–2

Details
- Draw: 16
- Seeds: 4

Events
Singles	Doubles
← 1995 ·	AT&T Challenge	· 1997 →

Sergio Casal and Emilio Sánchez were the defending champions but did not compete that year.

Christo van Rensburg and David Wheaton won in the final 7–6, 6–2 against Bill Behrens and Matt Lucena.

== Seeds ==
Champion seeds are indicated in bold text while text in italics indicates the round in which those seeds were eliminated.

1. (Sweden) Jan Apell / (Sweden) Jonas Björkman (semifinals)
2. (United States) Brian MacPhie / (Australia) Michael Tebbutt (quarterfinals)
3. (United States) Mark Keil / (United States) Dave Randall (first round)
4. (United States) Scott Davis / (Australia) Sandon Stolle (semifinals)

== Draw ==
=== Key ===
- Q = Qualifier
- WC = Wild card
- LL = Lucky loser
- Alt = Alternate
- SE = Special exempt
- PR = Protected ranking
- ITF = ITF entry
- JE = Junior exempt
- w/o = Walkover
- r = Retired
- d = Defaulted
- SR = Special ranking

First round
1	(Sweden) **J Apell** (Sweden) **J Björkman**	**6**	**6**
(United States) L Jensen (United States) M Jensen	3	3
WC	(Australia) P Cash (United States) J Connors	1	**6**	6
(United States) **J Palmer** (United States) **R Reneberg**	**6**	4	**7**
3	(United States) M Keil (United States) D Randall	6	6
WC	(United States) **B Bryan** (United States) **M Bryan**	**7**	**7**
Q	(Venezuela) J C Bianchi (The Bahamas) R Smith	5	3
(South Africa) **C van Rensburg** (United States) **D Wheaton**	**7**	**6**
(United States) **K Jones** (United States) **C Woodruff**	**6**	3	**7**
(United States) K Flach (South Africa) B Haygarth	2	**6**	6
WC	(United States) D Cassidy (New Zealand) K Evernden	0	1
4	(United States) **S Davis** (Australia) **S Stolle**	**6**	**6**
(United States) K Kinnear (United States) K Thorne	3	6
(United States) **B Behrens** (United States) **M Lucena**	**6**	**7**
(Argentina) J Frana (Czech Republic) K Nováček	3	3
2	(United States) **B MacPhie** (Australia) **M Tebbutt**	**6**	**6**

Quarterfinals
1	(Sweden) **J Apell** (Sweden) **J Björkman**	**6**	**7**
(United States) J Palmer (United States) R Reneberg	3	6
WC	(United States) B Bryan (United States) M Bryan	4	**7**	6
(South Africa) **C van Rensburg** (United States) **D Wheaton**	**6**	6	**7**
(United States) K Jones (United States) C Woodruff	**6**	5	1
4	(United States) **S Davis** (Australia) **S Stolle**	2	**7**	**6**
(United States) **B Behrens** (United States) **M Lucena**	3	**6**	**7**
2	(United States) B MacPhie (Australia) M Tebbutt	**6**	3	6

Semifinals
1	(Sweden) J Apell (Sweden) J Björkman	**6**	5	3
(South Africa) **C van Rensburg** (United States) **D Wheaton**	4	**7**	**6**
4	(United States) S Davis (Australia) S Stolle	**7**	3	4
(United States) **B Behrens** (United States) **M Lucena**	6	**6**	**6**

Final
(South Africa) **Christo van Rensburg** (United States) **David Wheaton**	**7**	**6**
(United States) Bill Behrens (United States) Matt Lucena	6	2
