= 1997 Paegas Czech Open – Singles =

Singles
- 1997 Paegas Czech Open

Final
- Champion: (France) Cédric Pioline
- Runner-up: (Czech Republic) Bohdan Ulihrach
- Score: 6–2, 5–7, 7–6^{(7–4)}

Details
- Draw: 32 (2WC/4Q)
- Seeds: 8

Events
Singles	Doubles
- Prague Open

The 1997 Paegas Czech Open was a men's tennis tournament played on clay in Prague, Czech Republic that was part of the International Series of the 1997 ATP Tour. Yevgeny Kafelnikov was the defending champion, but lost in the second round to Marcello Craca.

Cédric Pioline won the title by defeating Bohdan Ulihrach 6–2, 5–7, 7–6^{(7–4)} in the final.

== Seeds ==
1. (Russia) Yevgeny Kafelnikov (second round)
2. (Chile) Marcelo Ríos (quarterfinals)
3. (Czech Republic) Bohdan Ulihrach (final)
4. (France) Cédric Pioline (champion)
5. (Spain) Javier Sánchez (first round)
6. (France) Arnaud Boetsch (first round)
7. (Czech Republic) Daniel Vacek (first round)
8. (Morocco) Hicham Arazi (first round)

== Draw ==
Key

- Q = Qualifier
- WC = Wild card
- LL = Lucky loser
- Alt = Alternate
- ITF = ITF entry
- PR = Protected ranking
- SR = Special ranking
- SE = Special exempt
- JE = Junior exempt
- JR = Junior Accelerator Programme entrant
- CO = College Accelerator Programme entrant
- NG = Next Gen Accelerator Program entrant
- w/o = Walkover
- r = Retired
- d = Defaulted

=== Finals ===
Semifinals
(Spain) Emilio Benfele Álvarez	3	7^{9}	1
4	(France) Cédric Pioline	6	6^{7}	6
3	(Czech Republic) Bohdan Ulihrach	6	6
(France) Fabrice Santoro	4	2

Final
4	(France) Cédric Pioline	6	5	7^{7}
3	(Czech Republic) Bohdan Ulihrach	2	7	6^{4}

=== Top half ===
First round
1	(Russia) Y Kafelnikov	7^{7}	6
(France) L Roux	6^{4}	1
(France) J Golmard	7	4	2
Q	(Germany) M Craca	5	6	6
(Ecuador) N Lapentti	6	6^{3}	6^{4}
(Spain) C Costa	2	7^{7}	7^{7}
(Spain) E Benfele Álvarez	6	6
8	(Morocco) H Arazi	3	0
4	(France) C Pioline	7	4	6
(Slovakia) K Kučera	5	6	4
WC	(Czech Republic) M Tabara	1	2
(Slovakia) J Krošlák	6	6
(Spain) M Górriz	6	6
(Germany) O Gross	4	1
(Australia) R Fromberg	6	6
5	(Spain) J Sánchez	2	2

Second round
1	(Russia) Y Kafelnikov	6^{4}	4
Q	(Germany) M Craca	7^{7}	6
(Spain) C Costa	5	6	4
(Spain) E Benfele Álvarez	7	4	6
4	(France) C Pioline	6	6
(Slovakia) J Krošlák	3	1
(Spain) M Górriz	2	4
(Australia) R Fromberg	6	6

Quarterfinals
Q	(Germany) M Craca	3	5
(Spain) E Benfele Álvarez	6	7
4	(France) C Pioline	6	4	6
(Australia) R Fromberg	4	6	2

Semifinals
(Spain) E Benfele Álvarez	3	7^{9}	1
4	(France) C Pioline	6	6^{7}	6

=== Bottom half ===
First round
6	(France) A Boetsch	4	3
(Spain) T Carbonell	6	6
Q	(Spain) A Portas	6	6
(France) T Champion	3	1
(Spain) G Blanco	6^{3}	6	6
(India) L Paes	7^{7}	3	4
Q	(Argentina) F Squillari	0	3
3	(Czech Republic) B Ulihrach	6	6
7/WC	(Czech Republic) D Vacek	5	0
(France) F Santoro	7	6
Q	(Romania) A Pavel	2	5
(Brazil) G Kuerten	6	7
(Spain) F Roig	6	2	4
(France) S Simian	4	6	6
(Bulgaria) O Stanoytchev	4	3
2	(Chile) M Ríos	6	6

Second round
(Spain) T Carbonell	6	3	2
Q	(Spain) A Portas	1	6	6
(Spain) G Blanco	4	0
3	(Czech Republic) B Ulihrach	6	6
(France) F Santoro	7^{7}	3	6
(Brazil) G Kuerten	6^{4}	6	1
(France) S Simian	4	2
2	(Chile) M Ríos	6	6

Quarterfinals
Q	(Spain) A Portas	6	4	4
3	(Czech Republic) B Ulihrach	2	6	6
(France) F Santoro	4	6	6
2	(Chile) M Ríos	6	3	0

Semifinals
3	(Czech Republic) B Ulihrach	6	6
(France) F Santoro	4	2
