= 1998 AT&T Challenge – Doubles =

Men's tennis tournament

Doubles
- 1998 AT&T Challenge

Final
- Champions: (South Africa) Ellis Ferreira (South Africa) Brent Haygarth
- Runners-up: (United States) Alex O'Brien (United States) Richey Reneberg
- Score: 6–3, 0–6, 6–2

Details
- Draw: 16
- Seeds: 4

Events
Singles	Doubles
← 1997 ·	AT&T Challenge	· 1999 →

The 1998 AT&T Challenge was a men's tennis tournament played on Clay in Atlanta, Georgia, United States that was part of the International Series of the 1998 ATP Tour. It was the thirteenth edition of the tournament and was held from April 27 through May 3, 1998.

== Seeds ==
Champion seeds are indicated in bold text while text in italics indicates the round in which those seeds were eliminated.

1. (United States) Alex O'Brien / (United States) Richey Reneberg (final)
2. (Zimbabwe) Wayne Black / (Canada) Sébastien Lareau (first round)
3. (United States) Trevor Kronemann / (United States) Dave Randall (first round)
4. (United States) Luke Jensen / (United States) Luke Jensen (first round)

== Draw ==
=== Key ===
- Q = Qualifier
- WC = Wild card
- LL = Lucky loser
- Alt = Alternate
- SE = Special exempt
- PR = Protected ranking
- ITF = ITF entry
- JE = Junior exempt
- w/o = Walkover
- r = Retired
- d = Defaulted
- SR = Special ranking

=== Finals ===
First round
1	(United States) **A O'Brien** **(United States) R Reneberg**	**6**	**6**
(United States) V Spadea (United States) G Van Emburgh	4	0
(United States) **M Merklein** **(United States) J Waite**	**6**	**7**
(United States) C Decker (United States) T Parrott	4	5
(United States) **B Bryan** **(United States) M Bryan**	**6**	3	**6**
3	(United States) T Kronemann (United States) D Randall	3	**6**	4
(South Africa) **G Stafford** **(South Africa) K Ullyett**	**6**	**6**
(United States) B Coupe (Belgium) T Vanhoudt	3	4
(United States) **J Courier** **(The Bahamas) M Knowles**	**7**	3	**6**
(Czechoslovakia) L Pimek (South Africa) B Talbot	6	**6**	3
(South Africa) **E Ferreira** **(South Africa) B Haygarth**	**6**	**6**
4	(United States) L Jensen (United States) M Jensen	3	4
(United States) **K Kinnear** **(South Africa) P Rosner**	6	**6**	**7**
(United States) J Gimelstob (Australia) S Stolle	**7**	4	6
(Australia) **M Tebbutt** **(Sweden) M Tillström**	5	**7**	**6**
2	(Zimbabwe) W Black (Canada) S Lareau	**7**	6	1

Quarterfinals
1	(United States) **A O'Brien** **(United States) R Reneberg**	**6**	**6**
(United States) M Merklein (United States) J Waite	4	2
(United States) B Bryan (United States) M Bryan	4	4
(South Africa) **G Stafford** **(South Africa) K Ullyett**	**6**	**6**
(United States) J Courier (The Bahamas) M Knowles	**6**	1	4
(South Africa) **E Ferreira** **(South Africa) B Haygarth**	2	**6**	**6**
(United States) K Kinnear (South Africa) P Rosner	3	6
(Australia) **M Tebbutt** **(Sweden) M Tillström**	**6**	**7**

Semifinals
1	(United States) **A O'Brien** **(United States) R Reneberg**	**6**	**6**
(South Africa) G Stafford (South Africa) K Ullyett	3	2
(South Africa) **E Ferreira** **(South Africa) B Haygarth**	4	**6**	**6**
(Australia) M Tebbutt (Sweden) M Tillström	**6**	3	4

Final
1	(United States) A O'Brien (United States) R Reneberg	3	**6**	2
(South Africa) **E Ferreira** **(South Africa) B Haygarth**	**6**	0	**6**
