= 1996 AT&T Challenge =

- Date: April 29 – May 5
- Edition: 11th
- Draw: 32S / 16D
- Prize money: $303,000
- Surface: Clay / outdoor
- Location: Johns Creek, Georgia, U.S.
- Venue: Atlanta Athletic Club

Champions

Singles
- (Morocco) Karim Alami

Doubles
- (South Africa) Christo van Rensburg / (United States) David Wheaton
← 1995 ·	AT&T Challenge	· 1997 →

The 1996 AT&T Challenge was a men's tennis tournament played on outdoor clay courts at the Atlanta Athletic Club in Johns Creek, Georgia in the United States and was part of the World Series of the 1996 ATP Tour. It was the 11th edition of the tournament and was held from April 29 through May 5, 1996. Sixth-seeded Karim Alami won the singles title.

== Finals ==
=== Singles ===
(Morocco) Karim Alami defeated (Sweden) Nicklas Kulti 6–3, 6–4

- It was Alami's 1st singles title of his career.

=== Doubles ===
(South Africa) Christo van Rensburg / (United States) David Wheaton defeated (United States) Bill Behrens / (United States) Matt Lucena 7–6, 6–2

- It was van Rensburg's 1st title of the year and the 21st of his career. It was Wheaton's only title of the year and the 6th of his career.
