= 1997 AT&T Challenge =

- Date: April 28 – May 4
- Edition: 12th
- Category: World Series
- Draw: 32S / 16D
- Prize money: $303,000
- Surface: Clay / outdoor
- Location: Johns Creek, Georgia, U.S.
- Venue: Atlanta Athletic Club

Champions

Singles
- (Uruguay) Marcelo Filippini

Doubles
- (Sweden) Jonas Björkman / (Sweden) Nicklas Kulti
← 1996 ·	AT&T Challenge	· 1998 →

The 1997 AT&T Challenge was a men's tennis tournament played on outdoor clay courts at the Atlanta Athletic Club in Johns Creek, Georgia in the United States and was part of the World Series of the 1997 ATP Tour. It was the 12th edition of the tournament and was held from April 28 through May 4, 1997. Unseeded Marcelo Filippini won the singles title.

== Finals ==
=== Singles ===
(Uruguay) Marcelo Filippini defeated (Australia) Jason Stoltenberg 7–6^{(7–2)}, 6–4

- It was Filippini's 1st title of the year and the 4th of his career.

=== Doubles ===
(Sweden) Jonas Björkman / (Sweden) Nicklas Kulti defeated (United States) Scott Davis / (United States) Kelly Jones 6–2, 7–6
