= 1999 AT&T Challenge – Singles =

Singles
- 1999 AT&T Challenge

Final
- Champions: (Austria) Stefan Koubek
- Runners-up: (France) Sébastien Grosjean
- Score: 6–1, 6–2

Details
- Draw: 32
- Seeds: 8

Events
Singles	Doubles
← 1998 ·	AT&T Challenge	· 2000 →

The 1999 AT&T Challenge was a men's tennis tournament played on Clay in Atlanta, United States that was part of the World Series of the 1999 ATP Tour. It was the fourteenth edition of the tournament and was held from 26 April – 2 May 1999.

== Seeds ==
Champion seeds are indicated in bold text while text in italics indicates the round in which those seeds were eliminated.

1. (Australia) Patrick Rafter (first round)
2. (Australia) Jason Stoltenberg (quarterfinals)
3. (United States) Vince Spadea (first round)
4. (United States) Michael Chang (second round)
5. (France) Sébastien Grosjean (final)
6. (Australia) Scott Draper (first round)
7. (United States) Jan-Michael Gambill (first round)
8. (Sweden) Magnus Larsson (semifinals)

== Draw ==
=== Key ===
- Q = Qualifier
- WC = Wild card
- LL = Lucky loser
- Alt = Alternate
- SE = Special exempt
- PR = Protected ranking
- ITF = ITF entry
- JE = Junior exempt
- w/o = Walkover
- r = Retired
- d = Defaulted
- SR = Special ranking

=== Finals ===
Semifinals
(United States) Jim Courier	6^{3}	3
5	**(France) Sébastien Grosjean**	**7**	**6**
**(Austria) Stefan Koubek**	5	**6**	**6**
8	(Sweden) Magnus Larsson	**7**	4	1

Final
**(Austria) Stefan Koubek**	**6**	**6**
5	(France) Sébastien Grosjean	1	2

=== Top half ===
First round
**(Argentina) M Rodríguez**	**7**	**7**
1	(Australia) P Rafter	6^{5}	6^{5}
**(Costa Rica) JA Marín**	**6**	**6**
(Peru) L Horna	4	3
**(United States) J Courier**	**6**	**6**
(Sweden) M Tillström	3	4
**(United States) J Gimelstob**	**6**	**6**
7	(United States) J-M Gambill	0	4
**(Belarus) M Mirnyi**	**7**	**6**
3	(United States) V Spadea	5	3
**(Armenia) S Sargsian**	**6**	**6**
(United States) C Woodruff	4	4
**(Uruguay) M Filippini**	**7**	**6**
(Czech Republic) P Korda	5	1
5	**(France) S Grosjean**	6^{6}	**7**	**6**
(United States) C Mamiit	**7**	5	1

Second round
**(Argentina) M Rodríguez**	**7**	**6**
(Costa Rica) JA Marín	6^{6}	3
**(United States) J Courier**	**6**	**7**
(United States) J Gimelstob	1	6^{5}
(Belarus) M Mirnyi	**6**	4	1
**(Armenia) S Sargsian**	3	**6**	**6**
(Uruguay) M Filippini	4	2
5	**(France) S Grosjean**	**6**	**6**

Quarterfinals
(Argentina) M Rodríguez	1	6^{2}
**(United States) J Courier**	**6**	**7**
(Armenia) S Sargsian	4	6^{5}
5	**(France) S Grosjean**	**6**	**7**

Semifinals
(United States) J Courier	6^{3}	3
5	**(France) S Grosjean**	**7**	**6**

=== Bottom half ===
First round
**(Argentina) G Cañas**	**6**	**6**
6	(Australia) S Draper	4	3
**(Spain) A Martín**	**6**	4	**7**
(Georgia (country)) I Labadze	2	**6**	6^{4}
**(Austria) S Koubek**	**6**	**7**
(Australia) T Woodbridge	2	6^{4}
4	**(United States) M Chang**	**6**	**6**
(Italy) G Pozzi	4	2
8	**(Sweden) M Larsson**	**6**	**6**
(Belgium) J Van Herck	3	2
**(Spain) G Blanco**	**6**	**7**
(Sweden) M Norman	4	6^{3}
**(Australia) M Woodforde**	2	**6**	**6**
(Australia) L Hewitt	**6**	3	4
2	**(Australia) J Stoltenberg**	**6**	**6**
(United States) P Goldstein	4	1

Second round
(Argentina) G Cañas	6^{3}	6^{4}
**(Spain) A Martín**	**7**	**7**
**(Austria) S Koubek**	**6**	**6**
4	(United States) M Chang	1	4
8	**(Sweden) M Larsson**	**7**	2	**6**
(Spain) G Blanco	6^{6}	**6**	1
(Australia) M Woodforde	2	3
2	**(Australia) J Stoltenberg**	**6**	**6**

Quarterfinals
(Spain) A Martín	5	2
**(Austria) S Koubek**	**7**	**6**
8	**(Sweden) M Larsson**	**6**	**6**
2	(Australia) J Stoltenberg	2	2

Semifinals
**(Austria) S Koubek**	5	**6**	**6**
8	(Sweden) M Larsson	**7**	4	1
