= 2009 Banja Luka Challenger – Doubles =

Doubles
- 2009 Banja Luka Challenger

Final
- Champions: (Jamaica) Dustin Brown (Austria) Rainer Eitzinger
- Runners-up: (Bosnia and Herzegovina) Ismar Gorčić (Italy) Simone Vagnozzi
- Score: 6–4, 6–3

Events
Singles	Doubles
← 2008 ·	Banja Luka Challenger	· 2010 →

Attila Balázs and Amir Hadad were the defending champions, but they chose to not play together this year.
Hungarian player, Balázs, decided to compete with Dušan Lojda. They were eliminated by Ismar Gorčić and Simone Vagnozzi in the semifinals.
Player from Israel, Hadad, partnered with Philipp Marx, but they lost to Nikola Ćirić and Miljan Zekić in the quarterfinals.
Dustin Brown and Rainer Eitzinger defeated Gorčić and Vagnozzi 6–4, 6–3 in the final.

== Seeds ==
1. (Israel) Amir Hadad / (Germany) Philipp Marx (quarterfinals)
2. (United Kingdom) Jamie Delgado / (United Kingdom) Jamie Murray (quarterfinals)
3. (Russia) Michail Elgin / (Russia) Denis Matsukevich (first round)
4. (Spain) Daniel Gimeno-Traver / (Spain) Pere Riba (quarterfinals)

== Draw ==
=== Key ===
- Q = Qualifier
- WC = Wild card
- LL = Lucky loser
- Alt = Alternate
- SE = Special exempt
- PR = Protected ranking
- ITF = ITF entry
- JE = Junior exempt
- w/o = Walkover
- r = Retired
- d = Defaulted
- SR = Special ranking

=== Draw ===
First round
1	(Israel) A Hadad (Germany) P Marx	2	7	[10]
(Czech Republic) J Minář (Czech Republic) J Pospíšil	6	6^{6}	[8]
WC	(Serbia) N Ćirić (Serbia) M Zekić	4	6	[10]
(Germany) T Kamke (Germany) J Reister	6	0	[5]
4	(Spain) D Gimeno-Traver (Spain) P Riba	6	6
WC	(Serbia) D Katić (Bosnia and Herzegovina) A Marić	2	3
(Serbia) D Mađarovski (Serbia) A Slović	6	2	[3]
(Jamaica) D Brown (Austria) R Eitzinger	2	6	[10]
(Spain) MÁ López Jaén (Spain) I Navarro	4	2
WC	(Serbia) D Savić (Montenegro) G Tošić	6	6
(Hungary) A Balázs (Czech Republic) D Lojda	6	6
3	(Russia) M Elgin (Russia) D Matsukevich	4	2
(Bosnia and Herzegovina) I Gorčić (Italy) S Vagnozzi	7	6
(Romania) A Cruciat (Spain) M López	6^{5}	2
(Monaco) B Balleret (Monaco) J-R Lisnard	3	1
2	(United Kingdom) J Delgado (United Kingdom) J Murray	6	6

Quarterfinals
1	(Israel) A Hadad (Germany) P Marx	6^{6}	5
WC	(Serbia) N Ćirić (Serbia) M Zekić	7	7
4	(Spain) D Gimeno-Traver (Spain) P Riba	1	2
(Jamaica) D Brown (Austria) R Eitzinger	6	6
WC	(Serbia) D Savić (Montenegro) G Tošić	3	6	[5]
(Hungary) A Balázs (Czech Republic) D Lojda	6	2	[10]
(Bosnia and Herzegovina) I Gorčić (Italy) S Vagnozzi	6	6
2	(United Kingdom) J Delgado (United Kingdom) J Murray	4	4

Semifinals
WC	(Serbia) N Ćirić (Serbia) M Zekić	4	7	[6]
(Jamaica) D Brown (Austria) R Eitzinger	6	6^{7}	[10]
(Hungary) A Balázs (Czech Republic) D Lojda	2	6^{3}
(Bosnia and Herzegovina) I Gorčić (Italy) S Vagnozzi	6	7

Finals
(Jamaica) D Brown (Austria) R Eitzinger	6	6
(Bosnia and Herzegovina) I Gorčić (Italy) S Vagnozzi	4	3
