= 1992 AT&T Challenge – Singles =

Singles
- 1992 AT&T Challenge

Final
- Champion: (United States) Andre Agassi
- Runner-up: (United States) Pete Sampras
- Score: 7–5, 6–4

Details
- Draw: 32 (3WC/4Q)
- Seeds: 8

Events
Singles	Doubles
← 1991 ·	Verizon Tennis Challenge	· 1993 →

Andre Agassi successfully defended his title by defeating Pete Sampras 7–5, 6–4 in the final. The head-to-head between both players was tied 3–3.

== Seeds ==
1. (United States) Pete Sampras (final)
2. (United States) Andre Agassi (champion)
3. (Commonwealth of Independent States) Alexander Volkov (quarterfinals)
4. (United States) Brad Gilbert (first round)
5. (Australia) Derrick Rostagno (first round)
6. (United States) MaliVai Washington (second round)
7. (United States) Jimmy Connors (quarterfinals)
8. (Peru) Jaime Yzaga (second round)

== Draw ==
=== Key ===
- Q = Qualifier
- WC = Wild card
- LL = Lucky loser
- Alt = Alternate
- SE = Special exempt
- PR = Protected ranking
- ITF = ITF entry
- JE = Junior exempt
- w/o = Walkover
- r = Retired
- d = Defaulted
- SR = Special ranking

=== Finals ===
Semifinals
1	(United States) Pete Sampras	6	6
(United States) Todd Witsken	4	2
(Peru) Pablo Arraya	4	3
2	(United States) Andre Agassi	6	6

Final
1	(United States) Pete Sampras	5	4
2	(United States) Andre Agassi	7	6

=== Top half ===
First round
1	(United States) P Sampras	7^{7}	7
(Uruguay) M Filippini	6^{3}	5
(Brazil) L Mattar	6	6
(Italy) P Canè	1	2
Q	(Commonwealth of Independent States) A Olhovskiy	4	4
(Italy) C Pistolesi	6	6
(Belgium) E Masso	6^{2}	4
7	(United States) J Connors	7^{7}	6
4	(United States) B Gilbert	4	6	4
(United States) T Witsken	6	0	6
(United States) J Arias	2	1
Q	(United States) T Martin	6	6
(Spain) F Roig	7	6
(Australia) R Fromberg	5	1
(Australia) M Woodforde	6	6
5	(Australia) D Rostagno	1	3

Second round
1	(United States) P Sampras	7^{7}	6
(Brazil) L Mattar	6^{5}	2
(Italy) C Pistolesi	6	2	4
7	(United States) J Connors	4	6	6
(United States) T Witsken	3	6	6
Q	(United States) T Martin	6	1	4
(Spain) F Roig	5	6	6
(Australia) M Woodforde	7	4	4

Quarterfinals
1	(United States) P Sampras	7^{7}	6
7	(United States) J Connors	6^{4}	2
(United States) T Witsken	7	6
(Spain) F Roig	5	3

Semifinals
1	(United States) P Sampras	6	6
(United States) T Witsken	4	2

=== Bottom half ===
First round
6	(United States) MV Washington	7	6
Q	(United States) J Stark	5	4
(Peru) P Arraya	7^{7}	4	6
Q	(United States) C Garner	6^{4}	6	4
(United States) J Tarango	6	6
(Argentina) R Azar	0	4
WC	(Argentina) G Vilas	7	6^{6}	3
3/WC	(Commonwealth of Independent States) A Volkov	5	7^{8}	6
8	(Peru) J Yzaga	7^{8}	6
(United States) B Shelton	6^{6}	3
(Netherlands) J Eltingh	7^{7}	6
(Argentina) F Davín	6^{4}	1
(Argentina) H de la Peña	6	0	7
(France) JP Fleurian	3	6	5
WC	(Sweden) M Pernfors	5	2
2	(United States) A Agassi	7	6

Second round
6	(United States) MV Washington	6^{4}	2
(Peru) P Arraya	7^{7}	6
(United States) J Tarango	6	4	0
3/WC	(Commonwealth of Independent States) A Volkov	4	6	6
8	(Peru) J Yzaga	3	0
(Netherlands) J Eltingh	6	6
(Argentina) H de la Peña	3	3
2	(United States) A Agassi	6	6

Quarterfinals
(Peru) P Arraya	6	6^{6}	6
3/WC	(Commonwealth of Independent States) A Volkov	4	7^{8}	3
(Netherlands) J Eltingh	6	3	4
2	(United States) A Agassi	3	6	6

Semifinals
(Peru) P Arraya	4	3
2	(United States) A Agassi	6	6
