= 1993 AT&T Challenge – Singles =

Singles
- 1993 AT&T Challenge

Final
- Champion: (Netherlands) Jacco Eltingh
- Runner-up: (United States) Bryan Shelton
- Score: 7–6^{(7–1)}, 6–2

Details
- Draw: 32 (3WC/4Q/1LL)
- Seeds: 8

Events
Singles	Doubles
← 1992 ·	Verizon Tennis Challenge	· 1994 →

Andre Agassi was the defending champion, but did not compete this year.

Jacco Eltingh won the title by defeating Bryan Shelton 7–6^{(7–1)}, 6–2 in the final.

== Seeds ==
1. (United States) Pete Sampras (semifinals)
2. (n/a)
3. (United States) MaliVai Washington (second round)
4. (United States) Brad Gilbert (second round)
5. (United States) Todd Martin (first round)
6. (United States) Richey Reneberg (first round)
7. (Mexico) Luis Herrera (first round)
8. (United States) Aaron Krickstein (first round)

== Draw ==
=== Key ===
- Q = Qualifier
- WC = Wild card
- LL = Lucky loser
- Alt = Alternate
- SE = Special exempt
- PR = Protected ranking
- ITF = ITF entry
- JE = Junior exempt
- w/o = Walkover
- r = Retired
- d = Defaulted
- SR = Special ranking

=== Finals ===
Semifinals
1	(United States) Pete Sampras	6^{5}	4
(Netherlands) Jacco Eltingh	7^{7}	6
Q	(United States) Jared Palmer	3	7	1
(United States) Bryan Shelton	6	5	6

Final
(Netherlands) Jacco Eltingh	7^{7}	6
(United States) Bryan Shelton	6^{1}	2

=== Top half ===
First round
1	(United States) P Sampras	6	6
Q	(United States) V Spadea	3	4
(Austria) H Skoff	7	6
(Austria) G Schaller	5	1
(Czech Republic) S Doseděl	2	5
(Australia) R Fromberg	6	7
WC	(Sweden) M Wilander	6	6
7	(Mexico) L Herrera	2	3
3	(United States) MV Washington	7^{7}	6
WC	(United States) J Connors	6^{5}	2
(Argentina) R Azar	6	6^{7}	6
(United States) D Rostagno	3	7^{9}	2
(Australia) J Morgan	5	6^{6}
(Netherlands) J Eltingh	7	7^{8}
(Haiti) R Agénor	7^{7}	7
5	(United States) T Martin	6^{4}	5

Second round
1	(United States) P Sampras	6	6
(Austria) H Skoff	1	2
(Australia) R Fromberg	6	6
WC	(Sweden) M Wilander	3	1
3	(United States) MV Washington	6	3	4
(Argentina) R Azar	3	6	6
(Netherlands) J Eltingh	3	6	6
(Haiti) R Agénor	6	3	4

Quarterfinals
1	(United States) P Sampras	7^{7}	6
(Australia) R Fromberg	6^{3}	4
(Argentina) R Azar	2	2
(Netherlands) J Eltingh	6	6

Semifinals
1	(United States) P Sampras	6^{5}	4
(Netherlands) J Eltingh	7^{7}	6

=== Bottom half ===
First round
6	(United States) R Reneberg	6^{6}	6^{5}
Q	(United States) J Palmer	7^{8}	7^{7}
(United States) R Weiss	7	r
(Peru) J Yzaga	5
(Uruguay) D Pérez	2	5
(Spain) A Berasategui	6	7
Q	(South Africa) E Ferreira	6	2	6^{5}
4	(United States) B Gilbert	4	6	7^{7}
8	(United States) A Krickstein	6	1	3
(United States) J Tarango	2	6	6
(United States) B Shelton	6	6
(Mexico) L Lavalle	2	4
Q	(United States) J Arias	3	3
WC	(Ecuador) A Gómez	6	6
(Switzerland) C Mezzadri	6	6
LL	(Canada) A Sznajder	3	2

Second round
Q	(United States) J Palmer	7^{7}	6
(Peru) J Yzaga	6^{4}	2
(Spain) A Berasategui	6	6
4	(United States) B Gilbert	4	3
(United States) J Tarango	2	3
(United States) B Shelton	6	6
WC	(Ecuador) A Gómez	7^{7}	4	6
(Switzerland) C Mezzadri	6^{4}	6	3

Quarterfinals
Q	(United States) J Palmer	7^{7}	6
(Spain) A Berasategui	6^{4}	2
(United States) B Shelton	6^{6}	6	6
WC	(Ecuador) A Gómez	7^{8}	4	3

Semifinals
Q	(United States) J Palmer	3	7	1
(United States) B Shelton	6	5	6
