= 1999 AT&T Challenge =

- Date: 26 April – 2 May
- Edition: 14th
- Category: World Series
- Draw: 32S / 16D
- Prize money: $325,000
- Surface: Clay / outdoor
- Location: Atlanta, United States

Champions

Singles
- (Austria) Stefan Koubek

Doubles
- (United States) Patrick Galbraith / (United States) Justin Gimelstob
- AT&T Challenge

The 1999 AT&T Challenge was a men's tennis tournament played on outdoor clay courts in Atlanta, Georgia, United States that was part of the World Series of the 1999 ATP Tour. It was the fourteenth edition of the tournament and was held from 26 April through 2 May 1999. Unseeded Stefan Koubek won the singles title.

== Finals ==
=== Singles ===
(Austria) Stefan Koubek defeated (France) Sébastien Grosjean, 6–1, 6–2

=== Doubles ===
(United States) Patrick Galbraith / (United States) Justin Gimelstob defeated (Australia) Todd Woodbridge / (Australia) Mark Woodforde, 5–7, 7–6^{(7–4)}, 6–3
