= 1998 Paegas Czech Open =

- Date: 27 April – 3 May
- Edition: 12th
- Category: World Series
- Draw: 32S / 16D
- Prize money: $340,000
- Surface: Clay / outdoor
- Location: Prague, Czech Republic
- Venue: I. Czech Lawn Tennis Club

Champions

Singles
- (Brazil) Fernando Meligeni

Doubles
- (Australia) Wayne Arthurs / (Australia) Andrew Kratzmann
- Prague Open

The 1998 Paegas Czech Open, also known as the Prague Open, was a men's tennis tournament played on outdoor clay courts in Prague, Czech Republic that was part of the World Series of the 1998 ATP Tour. It was the twelfth edition of the tournament and was held from 27 April until 3 May 1998. Unseeded Fernando Meligeni won the singles title.

== Finals ==
=== Singles ===
(Brazil) Fernando Meligeni defeated (Czech Republic) Ctislav Doseděl, 6–1, 6–4.

- It was Meligeni's 1st singles title of the year and the 3rd and last of his career.

=== Doubles ===
(Australia) Wayne Arthurs / (Australia) Andrew Kratzmann defeated (Sweden) Fredrik Bergh / (Sweden) Nicklas Kulti, 6–1, 6–1.

== See also ==
- 1998 Skoda Czech Open – women's tournament
