= 1992 AT&T Challenge =

Tennis tournament

- Date: April 27 – May 3
- Edition: 8th
- Category: World Series
- Draw: 32S / 16D
- Prize money: $235,000
- Surface: Clay / outdoor
- Location: Johns Creek, Georgia, U.S.
- Venue: Atlanta Athletic Club

Champions

Singles
- (United States) Andre Agassi

Doubles
- (United States) Steve DeVries / (Australia) David Macpherson
- AT&T Challenge

The 1992 AT&T Challenge was a men's tennis tournament played on outdoor clay courts in Atlanta, Georgia, United States that was part of the World Series of the 1992 ATP Tour. It was the eighth edition of the tournament and was held from April 27 through May 3, 1992. Second-seeded Andre Agassi won the singles title.

== Finals ==
=== Singles ===
(United States) Andre Agassi defeated (United States) Pete Sampras, 7–5, 6–4

- It was Agassi's 1st singles title of the year and 15th of his career.

=== Doubles ===
(United States) Steve DeVries / (Australia) David Macpherson defeated (United States) Mark Keil / (United States) Dave Randall 6–3, 6–3

== See also ==
- Agassi–Sampras rivalry
