= 1994 AT&T Challenge =

Tennis tournament

- Date: April 25 – May 2
- Edition: 10th
- Category: World Series
- Draw: 32S / 16D
- Prize money: $288,750
- Surface: Clay / outdoor
- Location: Johns Creek, Georgia, U.S.
- Venue: Atlanta Athletic Club

Champions

Singles
- (United States) Michael Chang

Doubles
- (United States) Jared Palmer / (United States) Richey Reneberg
← 1993 ·	AT&T Challenge	· 1995 →

The 1994 AT&T Challenge was an ATP men's tennis tournament held in Atlanta, Georgia, United States that was part of the World Series of the 1994 ATP Tour. It was the tenth edition of the tournament and was held from April 25 through May 2, 1994. First-seeded Michael Chang won the singles title.

== Finals ==
=== Singles ===
(United States) Michael Chang defeated (United States) Todd Martin, 6–7^{(4–7)}, 7–6^{(7–4)}, 6–0

- It was Chang's 4th singles title of the year and 17th of his career.

=== Doubles ===
(United States) Jared Palmer / (United States) Richey Reneberg defeated (United States) Francisco Montana / (United States) Jim Pugh 4–6, 7–6, 6–4
