= Petr Luxa =

Czech tennis player (born 1972)

- Country (sports): Czech Republic
- Residence: Prague, Czech Republic
- Born: 3 March 1972 (age 53); Prague, Czechoslovakia
- Height: 1.90 m (6 ft 3 in)
- Turned pro: 1993
- Retired: 2005
- Plays: Right-handed (two-handed backhand)
- Prize money: $635,062

Singles
- Career record: 1–20
- Career titles: 0; 2 Challenger, 0 Futures
- Highest ranking: No. 150 (10 September 2006)

Grand Slam singles results
- Australian Open: 1R (1999)
- French Open: 1R (1999)
- Wimbledon: 1R (2003)
- US Open: Q3 (1997, 1998)

Doubles
- Career record: 60–71
- Career titles: 3; 11 Challenger, 0 Futures
- Highest ranking: No. 46 (24 February 2003)

Grand Slam doubles results
- Australian Open: 3R (2003)
- French Open: 1R (2001, 2002, 2003, 2005)
- Wimbledon: 2R (2003)
- US Open: 3R (2003)

Mixed doubles
- Career record: 0–1
- Career titles: 0

Grand Slam mixed doubles results
- Wimbledon: 1R (2002)
- Last updated on: 11 April 2025.

Petr Luxa (born 3 March 1972) is a retired professional tennis player from Czech Republic. He mainly played doubles, winning three titles partnering fellow countryman Radek Štěpánek.

== ATP career finals ==
=== Doubles: 1 (0 titles, 1 runner-up) ===
Legend Grand Slam Tournaments (0–0) ATP World Tour Finals (0–0) ATP World Tour Masters Series (0–0) ATP Championship Series (0–0) ATP World Series (0–0)	Finals by surface Hard (0–1) Clay (2–1) Grass (0–0) Carpet (1–0)	Finals by setting Outdoors (2–2) Indoors (1–0)

Result	W–L	Date	Tournament	Tier	Surface	Partner	Opponents	Score
Loss	0–1	May 1997	Prague, Czech Republic	World Series	Clay	(Czech Republic) David Skoch	(India) Mahesh Bhupathi (India) Leander Paes	1–6, 1–6
Win	1–1	May 2001	Munich, Germany	International Series	Clay	(Czech Republic) Radek Stepanek	(Brazil) Jaime Oncins (Argentina) Daniel Orsanic	5–7, 6–2, 7–6^{(7–5)}
Loss	1–2	Sep 2001	Hong Kong, Hong Kong	World Series	Hard	(Czech Republic) Radek Stepanek	(Germany) Karsten Braasch (Brazil) Andre Sa	0–6, 5–7
Win	2–2	May 2002	Munich, Germany	International Series	Clay	(Czech Republic) Radek Stepanek	(Czech Republic) Petr Pala (Czech Republic) Pavel Vizner	6–0, 6–7^{(4–7)}, [11–9]
Win	3–2	Feb 2003	Milan, Italy	International Series	Carpet	(Czech Republic) Radek Stepanek	(Czech Republic) Tomas Cibulec (Czech Republic) Pavel Vizner	6–4, 7–6^{(7–4)}

== ATP Challenger and ITF Futures finals ==
=== Singles: 6 (2–4) ===
Legend ATP Challenger (2–3) ITF Futures (0–1)	Finals by surface Hard (1–1) Clay (0–1) Grass (0–0) Carpet (1–2)

Result	W–L	Date	Tournament	Tier	Surface	Opponent	Score
Win	1–0	Mar 1997	Magdeburg, Germany	Challenger	Carpet	(Zimbabwe) Kevin Ullyett	6–3, 2–6, 7–5
Loss	1–1	Oct 1997	Eckental, Germany	Challenger	Carpet	(Germany) Rainer Schuettler	4–6, 1–6
Loss	1–2	Aug 1998	Istanbul, Turkey	Challenger	Hard	(Czech Republic) Tomas Zib	6–4, 2–6, 1–6
Loss	1–3	Oct 1999	Eckental, Germany	Challenger	Carpet	(Switzerland) George Bastl	6–7, 6–4, 4–6
Loss	1–4	May 2001	Slovakia F2, Prievidza	Futures	Clay	(Romania) Victor Hanescu	2–6, 1–6
Win	2–4	Sep 2002	Istanbul, Turkey	Challenger	Hard	(France) Nicolas Thomann	6–3, 6–4

=== Doubles: 20 (11–9) ===
Legend ATP Challenger (11–9) ITF Futures (0–0)	Finals by surface Hard (4–1) Clay (6–4) Grass (0–0) Carpet (1–4)

Result	W–L	Date	Tournament	Tier	Surface	Partner	Opponents	Score
Win	1–0	Aug 1996	Plzeň, Czech Republic	Challenger	Clay	(Czech Republic) Jan Kodes	(Czech Republic) Michal Tabara (Czech Republic) Jiri Vanek	6–2, 7–5
Loss	1–1	Mar 1997	Magdeburg, Germany	Challenger	Carpet	(Czech Republic) Tomas Anzari	(United States) Trey Phillips (United Kingdom) Chris Wilkinson	3–6, 4–6
Loss	1–2	Jul 1997	Ulm, Germany	Challenger	Clay	(Czech Republic) Petr Pala	(Belgium) Kris Goossens (Belgium) Tom Vanhoudt	3–6, 0–6
Win	2–2	Jul 1997	Contrexeville, France	Challenger	Clay	(Czech Republic) David Skoch	(South Africa) Brent Haygarth (United States) Greg Van Emburgh	6–4, 6–2
Win	3–2	Aug 1998	Istanbul, Turkey	Challenger	Hard	(Israel) Eyal Ran	(Australia) Todd Larkham (United Kingdom) Chris Wilkinson	6–4, 7–6
Loss	3–3	Aug 1998	Binghamton, United States	Challenger	Hard	(Mexico) Bernardo Martinez	(South Africa) Myles Wakefield (New Zealand) Wesley Whitehouse	5–7, 6–2, 5–7
Win	4–3	Jul 1999	Oberstaufen, Germany	Challenger	Clay	(Netherlands) Edwin Kempes	(Germany) Karsten Braasch (Germany) Jens Knippschild	7–5, 6–4
Loss	4–4	Jun 2000	Prostejov, Czech Republic	Challenger	Clay	(Italy) Vincenzo Santopadre	(Spain) Alberto Martín (Israel) Eyal Ran	2–6, 2–6
Win	5–4	Aug 2000	Bronx, United States	Challenger	Hard	(New Zealand) Wesley Whitehouse	(South Korea) Lee Hyung-taik (South Korea) Yoon Yong-il	3–6, 6–3, 6–2
Win	6–4	Sep 2000	Aschaffenburg, Germany	Challenger	Clay	(Czech Republic) David Skoch	(Netherlands) Marcus Hilpert (South Africa) Vaughan Snyman	6–2, 6–3
Loss	6–5	Sep 2000	Linz, Austria	Challenger	Clay	(Czech Republic) David Skoch	(Austria) Julian Knowle (Austria) Thomas Strengberger	3–6, 5–7
Loss	6–6	Jan 2001	Heilbronn, Germany	Challenger	Carpet	(Czech Republic) David Skoch	(Netherlands) Sander Groen (United States) Jack Waite	6–1, 3–6, 6–7^{(4–7)}
Win	7–6	Nov 2001	Bratislava, Slovakia	Challenger	Carpet	(Czech Republic) Radek Stepanek	(Czech Republic) Frantisek Cermak (Czech Republic) Ota Fukarek	6–4, 6–3
Loss	7–7	Jun 2002	Braunschweig, Germany	Challenger	Clay	(Czech Republic) Frantisek Cermak	(Argentina) Mariano Hood (Peru) Luis Horna	6–3, 3–6, 1–6
Win	8–7	Feb 2003	Wroclaw, Poland	Challenger	Hard	(Czech Republic) David Skoch	(Czech Republic) Petr Pala (Czech Republic) Pavel Vizner	6–4, 6–4
Win	9–7	Aug 2004	Manerbio, Italy	Challenger	Clay	(Czech Republic) Martin Stepanek	(Sweden) Johan Landsberg (Netherlands) Rogier Wassen	6–4, 6–2
Loss	9–8	Nov 2004	Aschen, Germany	Challenger	Carpet	(Czech Republic) Petr Pala	(Sweden) Simon Aspelin (Australia) Todd Perry	3–6, 3–6
Loss	9–9	Nov 2004	Eckental, Germany	Challenger	Carpet	(Italy) Daniele Bracciali	(Germany) Christopher Kas (Germany) Philipp Petzschner	4–6, 6–7^{(5–7)}
Win	10–9	Nov 2004	Luxembourg, Luxembourg	Challenger	Hard	(Italy) Massimo Bertolini	(Germany) Karsten Braasch (Germany) Michael Kohlmann	7–6^{(7–4)}. 4–6, 6–3
Win	11–9	Jun 2005	Kosice, Slovakia	Challenger	Clay	(Slovakia) Igor Zelenay	(Sweden) Johan Landsberg (Israel) Harel Levy	6–4, 6–3
