= Marcello Craca =

German tennis player

- Country (sports): Germany
- Residence: Bad Wildbad
- Born: 27 October 1974 (age 50); Pforzheim, West Germany
- Height: 5 ft 11 in (180 cm)
- Turned pro: 1995
- Plays: Right-handed
- Prize money: $273,659

Singles
- Career record: 11-23
- Career titles: 0
- Highest ranking: No. 90 (12 Jan 1998)

Grand Slam singles results
- Australian Open: 1R (1998)
- French Open: 1R (1998)
- Wimbledon: 1R (1997)

Doubles
- Career record: 0-0

Marcello Craca (born 27 October 1974) is a former professional tennis player from Germany.

== Personal ==
Craca was born to an Italian father and German mother.

== Career ==
Craca made his Grand Slam debut in the 1997 Wimbledon Championships, where he lost to reigning champion Richard Krajicek in the opening round. He made the quarter-finals of the 1997 Prague Open, in a run which included a win over world number four Yevgeny Kafelnikov.

In 1998 he appeared in both the Australian Open and French Open. He lost in the first round at each event, to David Wheaton in Australia and to Christophe Van Garsse in the France Open. The German was a quarter-finalist in Orlando that year.

== Challenger Titles ==
=== Singles: (1) ===
No.	Year	Tournament	Surface	Opponent in the final	Score in the final
1.	1999	Sofia, Bulgaria	Clay	(Bulgaria) Orlin Stanoytchev	7–6, 6–0
