= Wade McGuire =

American tennis player

- Country (sports): United States
- Born: August 19, 1969 (age 55); Richmond, Virginia
- Height: 6 ft 2 in (1.88 m)
- Turned pro: 1993
- Plays: Right-handed
- Prize money: $204,614

Singles
- Career record: 7–20
- Career titles: 0
- Highest ranking: No. 163 (April 3, 1995)

Grand Slam singles results
- Wimbledon: 1R (1997, 1998)
- US Open: 1R (1994)

Doubles
- Career record: 3–5
- Career titles: 0
- Highest ranking: No. 221 (September 12, 1994)

Grand Slam doubles results
- US Open: 2R (1994)

Wade McGuire (born August 19, 1969) is a former professional tennis player from the United States.

== Early life ==
Wade McGuire was born on August 19, 1969. His mother is Marie Coleman. He holds the record for the youngest winner of the Richmond Tennis Tournament at 12 years old. He then won it multiple years in a row.

== Career ==
McGuire was an All-American in each of his three years at the University of Georgia, from 1991 to 1993. He was the NCAA singles runner-up in both 1992 and 1993.

In the 1994 US Open, McGuire appeared in the main draw as a wildcard and lost in the opening round to 12th seed Wayne Ferreira. He also competed in the men's doubles with Jeff Tarango. They defeated Mike Bauer and Alexander Mronz in the first round, before being eliminated in the second round by Rikard Bergh and Mark Keil.

McGuire was a semi-finalist at the 1994 AT&T Challenge in Atlanta, with wins over Bryan Shelton, Marcelo Filippini and Lars Jonsson. In the 1996 Legg Mason Tennis Classic he defeated then world number 32 Carlos Costa.

He competed in back to back Wimbledon Championships in 1997 and 1998, but was unable to progress past the first round in either, losing to Jens Knippschild and Michael Tebbutt respectively. He is now a tennis pro at the Atlantic Club in New Jersey.
