= David Škoch =

Czech tennis player (born 1976)

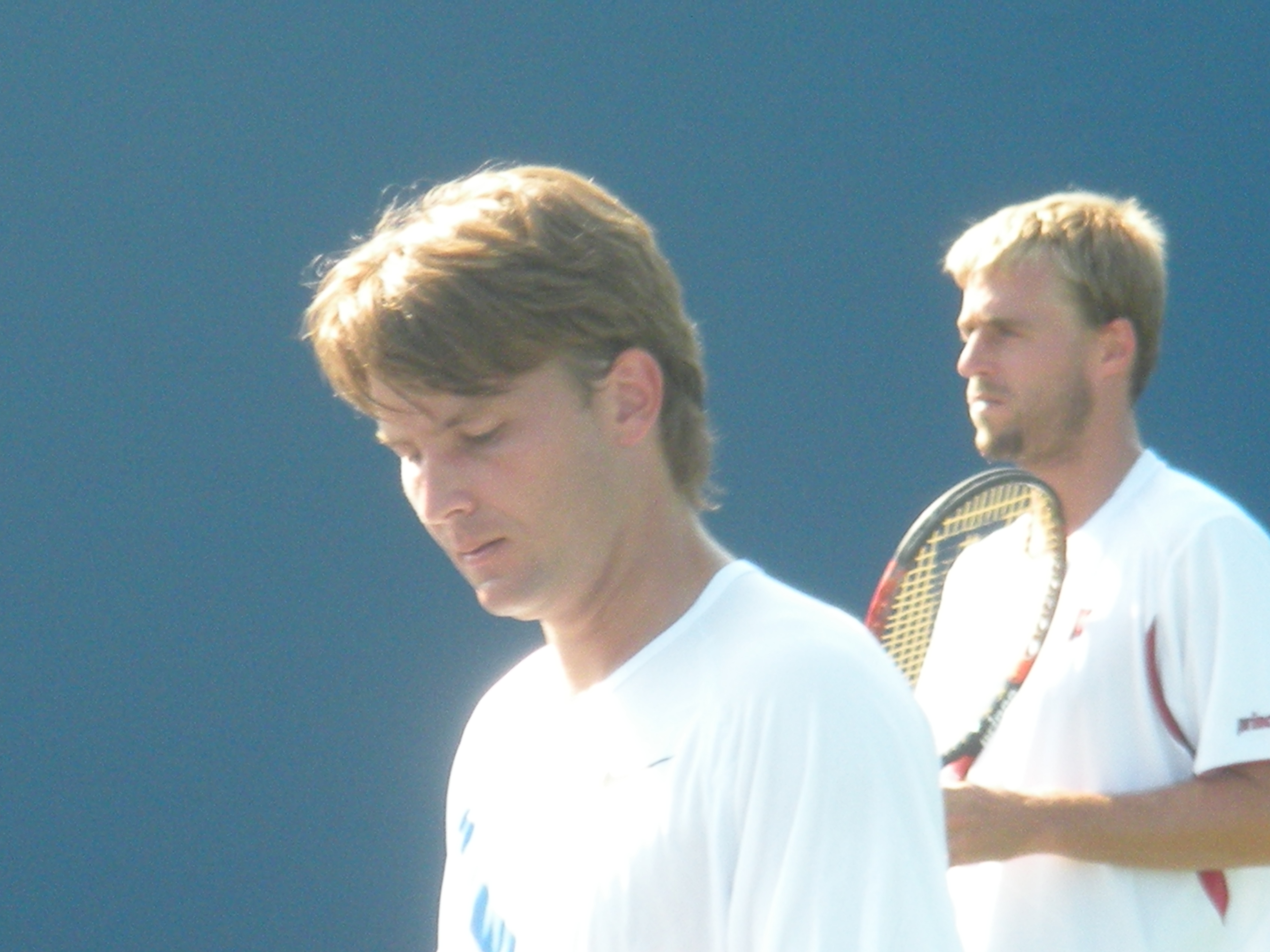
- Škoch (front) and doubles partner Oliver Marach (back)
- Country (sports): Czech Republic
- Residence: Prague, Czech Republic
- Born: 6 November 1976 (age 49) Brandýs nad Labem-Stará Boleslav, Czechoslovakia
- Height: 1.82 m (6 ft 0 in)
- Turned pro: 1994
- Retired: 2020
- Plays: Right-handed (two-handed backhand)
- Prize money: $949,707

Singles
- Career record: 5–12
- Career titles: 0; 1 Challenger, 2 Futures
- Highest ranking: No. 133 (31 March 1997)

Grand Slam singles results
- French Open: Q2 (1997)
- Wimbledon: Q2 (1998)
- US Open: 1R (1996)

Doubles
- Career record: 133–173
- Career titles: 5; 21 Challenger, 5 Futures
- Highest ranking: No. 30 (7 January 2008)

Grand Slam doubles results
- Australian Open: 3R (2007)
- French Open: 2R (2006, 2007, 2009)
- Wimbledon: 3R (2007)
- US Open: 3R (2003)

Grand Slam mixed doubles results
- Australian Open: 1R (2008)
- Wimbledon: 2R (2008)
- Last updated on: 8 December 2021.

David Škoch (born 6 November 1976) is a Czech former professional doubles tennis player. He was the Wimbledon boys' singles champion in 1992.

In 2012–2019 he played in ITF tournaments with Petr Nouza, recently in May 2019 in Jablonec nad Nisou. In July 2019 he took 838 in ATP doubles ranking, after Nenad Zimonjić he is the second oldest player on the circuit and the oldest active Czech professional tennis player.

In 2022, he started coaching Miriam Kolodziejová, whom he eventually married in July 2024.

== Junior Grand Slam finals ==
=== Singles: 1 (1 title) ===
Result	Year	Tournament	Surface	Opponent	Score
Win	1992	Wimbledon	Grass	(United States) Brian Dunn	6–4, 6–3

== Performance timeline ==
Key
W	F	SF	QF	#R	RR	Q#	DNQ	A	NH

(W) winner; (F) finalist; (SF) semifinalist; (QF) quarterfinalist; (#R) rounds 4, 3, 2, 1; (RR) round-robin stage; (Q#) qualification round; (DNQ) did not qualify; (A) absent; (NH) not held; (SR) strike rate (events won / competed); (W–L) win–loss record.

=== Doubles ===
Tournament	1998	1999	2000	2001	2002	2003	2004	2005	2006	2007	2008	2009	2010	2011	SR	W–L	Win %
Grand Slam tournaments
Australian Open	A	A	A	A	1R	2R	2R	1R	1R	3R	2R	A	1R	A	0 / 8	5–8	38%
French Open	A	A	A	A	1R	1R	1R	1R	2R	2R	1R	2R	1R	A	0 / 9	3–9	25%
Wimbledon	1R	A	A	A	2R	1R	2R	1R	2R	3R	1R	3R	1R	1R	0 / 11	7–11	39%
US Open	A	A	A	1R	2R	3R	1R	1R	1R	1R	2R	1R	A	A	0 / 9	4–9	31%
Win–loss	0–1	0–0	0–0	0–1	2–4	3–4	2–4	0–4	2–4	5–4	2–4	3–3	0–3	0–1	0 / 37	19–37	34%
ATP Masters Series
Indian Wells	A	A	A	A	A	A	A	A	A	2R	A	A	A	A	0 / 1	1–1	50%
Miami	A	A	A	A	A	1R	A	A	A	2R	1R	A	A	A	0 / 3	1–3	25%
Hamburg	A	A	A	A	A	A	A	A	A	1R	A	NMS			0 / 1	0–1	0%
Win–loss	0–0	0–0	0–0	0–0	0–0	0–1	0–0	0–0	0–0	2–3	0–1	0–0	0–0	0–0	0 / 5	2–5	29%

== ATP career finals ==
=== Doubles: 11 (5 titles, 6 runner-ups) ===
Legend Grand Slam Tournaments (0–0) ATP World Tour Finals (0–0) ATP Masters 1000 Series (0–0) ATP 500 Series (0–0) ATP 250 Series (5–6)	Finals by surface Hard (1–0) Clay (4–5) Grass (0–1) Carpet (0–0)	Finals by setting Outdoors (5–6) Indoors (0–0)

Result	W–L	Date	Tournament	Tier	Surface	Partner	Opponents	Score
Loss	0–1	May 1997	Prague, Czech Republic	World Series	Clay	(Czech Republic) Petr Luxa	(India) Mahesh Bhupathi (India) Leander Paes	1–6, 1–6
Win	1–1	Jul 2004	Amersfoot, Netherlands	International Series	Clay	(Czech Republic) Jaroslav Levinský	(Argentina) José Acasuso (Peru) Luis Horna	6–0, 2–6, 7–5
Loss	1–2	Jul 2004	Umag, Croatia	International Series	Clay	(Czech Republic) Jaroslav Levinský	(Argentina) José Acasuso (Brazil) Flávio Saretta	6–4, 2–6, 4–6
Loss	1–3	Jul 2005	Umag, Croatia	International Series	Clay	(Slovakia) Michal Mertiňák	(Czech Republic) Jiří Novák (Czech Republic) Petr Pála	3–6, 3–6
Win	2–3	Apr 2006	Valencia, Spain	International Series	Clay	(Czech Republic) Tomáš Zíb	(Czech Republic) Lukáš Dlouhý (Czech Republic) Pavel Vízner	6–4, 6–3
Win	3–3	Jul 2006	Umag, Croatia	International Series	Clay	(Czech Republic) Jaroslav Levinský	(Spain) Guillermo García López (Spain) Albert Portas	6–4, 6–4
Win	4–3	Apr 2007	Casablanca, Morocco	International Series	Clay	(Australia) Jordan Kerr	(Poland) Łukasz Kubot (Austria) Oliver Marach	7–6^{(7–4)}, 1–6, [10–4]
Loss	4–4	May 2007	Pörtschach, Austria	International Series	Clay	(Czech Republic) Leoš Friedl	(Sweden) Simon Aspelin (Austria) Julian Knowle	6–7^{(6–8)}, 7–5, [5–10]
Loss	4–5	Jul 2007	Umag, Croatia	International Series	Clay	(Czech Republic) Jaroslav Levinský	(Czech Republic) Lukáš Dlouhý (Slovakia) Michal Mertiňák	1–6, 1–6
Win	5–5	Jan 2008	Doha, Qatar	International Series	Hard	(Germany) Philipp Kohlschreiber	(South Africa) Jeff Coetzee (South Africa) Wesley Moodie	6–4, 4–6, [11–9]
Loss	5–6	Jun 2010	Queen's, United Kingdom	250 Series	Grass	(Slovakia) Karol Beck	(Serbia) Novak Djokovic (Israel) Jonathan Erlich	7–6^{(8–6)}, 2–6, [3–10]

== ATP Challenger and ITF Futures finals ==
=== Singles: 4 (3–1) ===
Legend ATP Challenger (1–1) ITF Futures (2–0)	Finals by surface Hard (0–0) Clay (3–1) Grass (0–0) Carpet (0–0)

Result	W–L	Date	Tournament	Tier	Surface	Opponent	Score
Win	1–0	May 1996	Bratislava, Slovakia	Challenger	Clay	(Brazil) Gustavo Kuerten	6–2, 6–4
Loss	1–1	Jun 1996	Eisenach, Germany	Challenger	Clay	(Netherlands) Dennis van Scheppingen	4–6, 0–6
Win	2–1	Jul 1999	Germany F7, Kassel	Futures	Clay	(Czech Republic) Petr Kralert	6–1, 4–6, 6–4
Win	3–1	Aug 2006	Slovakia F2, Piešťany	Futures	Clay	(Slovakia) Ladislav Švarc	6–4, 6–3

=== Doubles: 59 (26–33) ===
Legend ATP Challenger (21–26) ITF Futures (5–7)	Finals by surface Hard (4–7) Clay (22–22) Grass (0–0) Carpet (0–4)

Result	W–L	Date	Tournament	Tier	Surface	Partner	Opponents	Score
Loss	0–1	Jul 1995	Prague, Czech Republic	Challenger	Clay	(Czech Republic) Petr Pála	(Belgium) Filip Dewulf (Czech Republic) Vojtěch Flégl	7–6, 5–7, 2–6
Win	1–1	Jul 1996	Ostend, Belgium	Challenger	Clay	(Argentina) Lucas Arnold Ker	(Belgium) Wim Neefs (Belgium) Yuri Soberon	7–6, 6–1
Loss	1–2	May 1997	Ljubljana, Slovenia	Challenger	Clay	(Netherlands) Fernon Wibier	(Argentina) Daniel Orsanic (Argentina) Lucas Arnold Ker	0–6, 4–6
Win	2–2	Jul 1997	Contrexéville, France	Challenger	Clay	(Czech Republic) Petr Luxa	(South Africa) Brent Haygarth (United States) Greg Van Emburgh	6–4, 6–2
Loss	2–3	Sep 2000	Budapest, Hungary	Challenger	Clay	(Czech Republic) David Miketa	(Argentina) Sergio Roitman (Argentina) Andrés Schneiter	3–6, 3–6
Win	3–3	Sep 2000	Aschaffenburg, Germany	Challenger	Clay	(Czech Republic) Petr Luxa	(Germany) Marcus Hilpert (South Africa) Vaughan Snyman	6–2, 6–3
Loss	3–4	Sep 2000	Linz, Austria	Challenger	Clay	(Czech Republic) Petr Luxa	(Austria) Julian Knowle (Austria) Thomas Strengberger	3–6, 5–7
Loss	3–5	Jan 2001	Heilbronn, Germany	Challenger	Carpet	(Czech Republic) Petr Luxa	(Netherlands) Sander Groen (United States) Jack Waite	6–1, 3–6, 6–7^{(4–7)}
Win	4–5	Jul 2001	Ulm, Germany	Challenger	Clay	(Czech Republic) František Čermák	(United States) Brandon Coupe (Australia) Tim Crichton	6–2, 6–4
Win	5–5	Aug 2001	San Marino, San Marino	Challenger	Clay	(Czech Republic) František Čermák	(United States) Devin Bowen (North Macedonia) Aleksandar Kitinov	7–5, 6–4
Loss	5–6	Aug 2001	Linz, Austria	Challenger	Clay	(Czech Republic) Jaroslav Levinský	(Australia) Todd Perry (North Macedonia) Aleksandar Kitinov	6–2, 3–6, 4–6
Loss	5–7	Oct 2001	Barcelona, Spain	Challenger	Clay	(Czech Republic) František Čermák	(Spain) Juan Ignacio Carrasco (Spain) Álex López Morón	4–6, 1–6
Loss	5–8	May 2002	Prague, Czech Republic	Challenger	Clay	(Czech Republic) Jaroslav Levinský	(Czech Republic) František Čermák (Czech Republic) Ota Fukárek	4–6, 3–6
Win	6–8	Jul 2002	Ulm, Germany	Challenger	Clay	(Czech Republic) Leoš Friedl	(Australia) Todd Perry (Australia) Tim Crichton	6–3, 4–6, 7–5
Win	7–8	Aug 2002	San Marino, San Marino	Challenger	Clay	(Czech Republic) Leoš Friedl	(Italy) Massimo Bertolini (Italy) Cristian Brandi	6–2, 6–4
Loss	7–9	Sep 2002	Szczecin, Poland	Challenger	Clay	(Czech Republic) Leoš Friedl	(Argentina) José Acasuso (Argentina) Andrés Schneiter	4–6, 5–7
Loss	7–10	Nov 2002	Bratislava, Slovakia	Challenger	Carpet	(Czech Republic) Leoš Friedl	(The Bahamas) Mark Merklein (United States) Scott Humphries	6–3, 4–6, 2–6
Win	8–10	Feb 2003	Wrocław, Poland	Challenger	Hard	(Czech Republic) Petr Luxa	(Czech Republic) Petr Pála (Czech Republic) Pavel Vízner	6–4, 6–4
Win	9–10	Feb 2003	Andrézieux, France	Challenger	Hard	(Croatia) Lovro Zovko	(Australia) Stephen Huss (United States) Jeff Tarango	7–6^{(7–4)}, 0–6, 6–3
Win	10–10	Jun 2003	Prostějov, Czech Republic	Challenger	Clay	(Czech Republic) Jaroslav Levinský	(Spain) Rubén Ramírez Hidalgo (Argentina) Sergio Roitman	6–2, 6–2
Loss	10–11	Sep 2003	Szczecin, Poland	Challenger	Clay	(Czech Republic) Jaroslav Levinský	(Poland) Mariusz Fyrstenberg (Poland) Marcin Matkowski	1–6, 5–7
Loss	10–12	Mar 2004	Saint Brieuc, France	Challenger	Clay	(Czech Republic) Jiří Vaněk	(Belgium) Christophe Rochus (Belgium) Tom Vanhoudt	0–6, 1–6
Loss	10–13	Apr 2004	Barletta, Italy	Challenger	Clay	(Czech Republic) Jaroslav Levinský	(Spain) Marc López (Spain) Fernando Vicente	6–7^{(6–8)}, 6–4, 4–6
Loss	10–14	Jun 2004	Braunschweig, Germany	Challenger	Clay	(Czech Republic) Jaroslav Levinský	(Germany) Tomas Behrend (Spain) Emilio Benfele Álvarez	2–6, 7–6^{(7–3)}, 6–7^{(10–12)}
Loss	10–15	Aug 2004	Poznań, Poland	Challenger	Clay	(Czech Republic) Tomáš Cibulec	(Poland) Adam Chadaj (France) Stéphane Robert	6–3, 1–6, 2–6
Win	11–15	Aug 2004	Geneva, Switzerland	Challenger	Clay	(Czech Republic) Tomáš Cibulec	(Austria) Werner Eschauer (Austria) Herbert Wiltschnig	6–2, 6–4
Win	12–15	Jun 2005	Prostějov, Czech Republic	Challenger	Clay	(Czech Republic) Lukáš Dlouhý	(Czech Republic) Jan Hájek (Czech Republic) Jan Masik	5–7, 6–3, 7–6^{(7–5)}
Win	13–15	Jul 2005	Rimini, Italy	Challenger	Clay	(Czech Republic) Martin Štěpánek	(Germany) Christopher Kas (Germany) Philipp Petzschner	6–3, 6–7^{(1–7)}, 6–1
Win	14–15	Aug 2005	San Marino, San Marino	Challenger	Clay	(Czech Republic) Lukáš Dlouhý	(South Africa) Jeff Coetzee (South Africa) Chris Haggard	3–6, 6–4, 6–3
Loss	14–16	Sep 2005	Istanbul, Turkey	Challenger	Hard	(Czech Republic) Martin Štěpánek	(Israel) Harel Levy (Israel) Noam Okun	4–6, 5–7
Win	15–16	Nov 2005	Dnipropetrovsk, Ukraine	Challenger	Hard	(Czech Republic) Lukáš Dlouhý	(Czech Republic) Tomáš Cibulec (Croatia) Lovro Zovko	7–5, 6–4
Loss	15–17	Jan 2006	Heilbronn, Germany	Challenger	Carpet	(Czech Republic) Lukáš Dlouhý	(Germany) Christopher Kas (Germany) Philipp Petzschner	7–6^{(7–2)}, 3–6, [4–10]
Win	16–17	May 2006	Prague, Czech Republic	Challenger	Clay	(Czech Republic) Petr Pála	(Argentina) Sergio Roitman (Paraguay) Ramón Delgado	6–0, 6–0
Loss	16–18	Oct 2006	Mons, Belgium	Challenger	Hard	(Australia) Jordan Kerr	(Switzerland) Jean-Claude Scherrer (Croatia) Lovro Zovko	2–6, 4–6
Loss	16–19	May 2007	Prague, Czech Republic	Challenger	Clay	(Czech Republic) Leoš Friedl	(Czech Republic) Tomáš Cibulec (Australia) Jordan Kerr	4–6, 2–6
Loss	16–20	Aug 2008	Cordenons, Italy	Challenger	Clay	(Slovakia) Igor Zelenay	(Italy) Marco Crugnola (Italy) Alessio di Mauro	6–1, 4–6, [6–10]
Loss	16–21	Aug 2008	Istanbul, Turkey	Challenger	Hard	(Slovakia) Igor Zelenay	(Germany) Michael Kohlmann (Germany) Frank Moser	6–7^{(4–7)}, 4–6
Win	17–21	Sep 2008	Trnava, Slovakia	Challenger	Clay	(Slovakia) Igor Zelenay	(Slovakia) Michal Mertiňák (Austria) Daniel Köllerer	6–3, 6–1
Loss	17–22	Mar 2009	Besançon, France	Challenger	Hard	(Slovakia) Igor Zelenay	(Slovakia) Karol Beck (Czech Republic) Jaroslav Levinský	6–2, 5–7, [7–10]
Win	18–22	Apr 2009	Sofia, Bulgaria	Challenger	Clay	(Slovakia) Dominik Hrbatý	(United Kingdom) James Auckland (Australia) Peter Luczak	6–2, 6–4
Loss	18–23	Nov 2009	Bratislava, Slovakia	Challenger	Carpet	(Czech Republic) Leoš Friedl	(Germany) Philipp Marx (Slovakia) Igor Zelenay	4–6, 4–6
Win	19–23	Sep 2010	Como, Italy	Challenger	Clay	(Germany) Frank Moser	(Germany) Martin Emmrich (Poland) Mateusz Kowalczyk	5–7, 7–6^{(7–2)}, [10–5]
Win	20–23	Sep 2010	Banja Luka, Bosnia & Herzegovina	Challenger	Clay	(United States) James Cerretani	(Canada) Adil Shamasdin (Croatia) Lovro Zovko	6–1, 6–4
Loss	20–24	Jan 2011	Heilbronn, Germany	Challenger	Hard	(Germany) Frank Moser	(United Kingdom) Jamie Delgado (United Kingdom) Jonathan Marray	1–6, 4–6
Loss	20–25	Oct 2011	Orléans, France	Challenger	Hard	(Italy) Simone Vagnozzi	(France) Pierre-Hugues Herbert (France) Nicolas Renavand	5–7, 3–6
Loss	20–26	Nov 2011	Bratislava, Slovakia	Challenger	Hard	(Czech Republic) Lukáš Rosol	(Czech Republic) Jan Hájek (Slovakia) Lukáš Lacko	5–7, 5–7
Win	21–26	Jul 2012	Marburg, Germany	Challenger	Clay	(Poland) Mateusz Kowalczyk	(Russia) Denis Matsukevich (Germany) Mischa Zverev	6–2, 6–1
Loss	21–27	Jun 2013	Netherlands F2, Alkmaar	Futures	Clay	(Czech Republic) Jan Zednik	(Finland) Henri Kontinen (Indonesia) Christopher Rungkat	5–7, 6–7^{(7–9)}
Win	22–27	Jul 2013	Germany F10, Trier	Futures	Clay	(Czech Republic) Jan Zednik	(Argentina) Gustavo Gomez Buyatti (Russia) Kirill Nasonov	6–2, 7–6^{(7–4)}
Loss	22–28	May 2014	Czech Republic F1, Teplice	Futures	Clay	(Czech Republic) Robin Stanek	(Poland) Andriej Kapaś (Russia) Andrey Rublev	5–7, 2–6
Loss	22–29	Jul 2016	Germany F8, Kassel	Futures	Clay	(Czech Republic) Petr Nouza	(Austria) Maximilian Neuchrist (Netherlands) David Pel	2–6, 6–7^{(5–7)}
Win	23–29	Mar 2017	Italy F4, Sondrio	Futures	Hard	(Czech Republic) Petr Nouza	(Italy) Walter Trusendi (Italy) Matteo Viola	6–3, 5–7, [10–8]
Win	24–29	Aug 2017	Hungary F6, Budapest	Futures	Clay	(Czech Republic) Petr Nouza	(Sweden) Patrik Brydolf (Sweden) Markus Eriksson	6–4, 6–0
Loss	24–30	Jul 2018	Germany F5, Kamen	Futures	Clay	(Czech Republic) Petr Nouza	(Spain) Marco Neubau (Germany) Robert Strombachs	4–6, 6–3, [5–10]
Win	25–30	Jul 2018	Czech Republic F6, Brno	Futures	Clay	(Czech Republic) Petr Nouza	(Slovakia) Filip Polášek (Czech Republic) Patrik Rikl	6–3, 2–6, [14–12]
Loss	25–31	Jul 2018	Austria F3, Wels	Futures	Clay	(Czech Republic) Petr Nouza	(Czech Republic) Filip Duda (Czech Republic) Michael Vrbenský	5–7, 6–7^{(5–7)}
Loss	25–32	Aug 2018	Slovakia F2, Piešťany	Futures	Clay	(Czech Republic) Petr Nouza	(Czech Republic) Petr Hájek (Slovakia) Marek Semjan	4–6, 4–6
Loss	25–33	Sep 2018	Switzerland F5, Schlieren	Futures	Clay	(Czech Republic) Petr Nouza	(Finland) Harri Heliövaara (Finland) Patrik Niklas-Salminen	3–6, 1–6
Win	26–33	Aug 2019	M25 Schlieren, Switzerland	World Tennis Tour	Clay	(Czech Republic) Petr Nouza	(United States) Yates Johnson (United States) Hunter Johnson	7–5, 6–3
