= 2008 ATP Challenger Series =

Details
- Duration: 31 December 2007 – 30 November 2008
- Edition: 31st
- Tournaments: 176

Achievements (singles)

The Association of Tennis Professionals (ATP) Challenger Series is the secondary professional tennis circuit organized by the ATP. The 2008 ATP Challenger Series calendar comprised 176 tournaments, with prize money ranging from $25,000 up to $150,000.

== Schedule ==
The table below shows the 2008 ATP Challenger Series schedule.

=== January ===
Week of	Tournament	Winner	Runner-up	Semifinalists	Quarterfinalists
Dec 31	Internationaux de Nouvelle-Calédonie; Nouméa, New Caledonia; Hard $75,000+H	(Italy) Flavio Cipolla; 6–4, 7–5	(Switzerland) Stéphane Bohli	(France) David Guez (Monaco) Jean-René Lisnard	(Uzbekistan) Denis Istomin (France) Josselin Ouanna (France) Augustin Gensse (South Africa) Kevin Anderson
Dec 31	Internationaux de Nouvelle-Calédonie; Nouméa, New Caledonia; Hard $75,000+H	(Italy) Cipolla (Italy) Vagnozzi; 6–4, 6–4	(Czech Republic) Mertl (Austria) Slanar	(France) David Guez (Monaco) Jean-René Lisnard	(Uzbekistan) Denis Istomin (France) Josselin Ouanna (France) Augustin Gensse (South Africa) Kevin Anderson
Dec 31	Prime Aberto de São Paulo; São Paulo, Brazil; Hard $100,000+H	(Brazil) Thiago Alves; 6–4, 3–6, 7–5	(Argentina) Carlos Berlocq	(Brazil) Marcos Daniel (Argentina) Juan Pablo Brzezicki	(Brazil) Thomaz Bellucci (Greece) Vasilis Mazarakis (Brazil) Eric Gomes (Brazil) Franco Ferreiro
Dec 31	Prime Aberto de São Paulo; São Paulo, Brazil; Hard $100,000+H	(United Kingdom) Delgado (Brazil) Soares; 6–1, 6–3	(Argentina) Dabul (Argentina) Zeballos	(Brazil) Marcos Daniel (Argentina) Juan Pablo Brzezicki	(Brazil) Thomaz Bellucci (Greece) Vasilis Mazarakis (Brazil) Eric Gomes (Brazil) Franco Ferreiro
Jan 14	La Serena Open; La Serena, Chile; Clay $50,000	(Spain) Rubén Ramírez Hidalgo; 6–3, 6–1	(Spain) David Marrero	(Argentina) Eduardo Schwank (Greece) Vasilis Mazarakis	(Argentina) Juan-Martín Aranguren (Spain) Gabriel Trujillo-Soler (Spain) José Antonio Sánchez-de Luna (Ecuador) Nicolás Lapentti
Jan 14	La Serena Open; La Serena, Chile; Clay $50,000	(Ecuador) Lapentti (Argentina) Schwank; 6–4, 6–0	(Argentina) Decoud (Argentina) Villagrán	(Argentina) Eduardo Schwank (Greece) Vasilis Mazarakis	(Argentina) Juan-Martín Aranguren (Spain) Gabriel Trujillo-Soler (Spain) José Antonio Sánchez-de Luna (Ecuador) Nicolás Lapentti
Jan 14	ITG Miami Challenger; Miami, USA; Clay $50,000+H	(France) Éric Prodon; 6–4, 6–4	(Spain) Adrián Menéndez-Maceiras	(Brazil) Ricardo Mello (Japan) Kei Nishikori	(Spain) Pablo Andújar (Argentina) Leonardo Mayer (Colombia) Carlos Salamanca (Paraguay) Ramón Delgado
Jan 14	ITG Miami Challenger; Miami, USA; Clay $50,000+H	(Serbia) Bozoljac (Serbia) Vemić; 7–5, 6–4	(Netherlands Antilles) Rojer (Brazil) Torres	(Brazil) Ricardo Mello (Japan) Kei Nishikori	(Spain) Pablo Andújar (Argentina) Leonardo Mayer (Colombia) Carlos Salamanca (Paraguay) Ramón Delgado
Jan 21	Intersport Heilbronn Open; Heilbronn, Germany; Hard (indoor) $100,000+H	(Russia) Andrey Golubev; 2–6, 6–1, 3–1 ret.	(Germany) Philipp Petzschner	(Italy) Stefano Galvani (Germany) Andreas Beck	(Croatia) Roko Karanušić (Canada) Frédéric Niemeyer (Germany) Dominik Meffert (South Africa) Rik de Voest
Jan 21	Intersport Heilbronn Open; Heilbronn, Germany; Hard (indoor) $100,000+H	(South Africa) de Voest (United States) Reynolds; 7–6^{(7–2)}, 6–7^{(5–7)}, 10–4	(Russia) Kunitsyn (Pakistan) Qureshi	(Italy) Stefano Galvani (Germany) Andreas Beck	(Croatia) Roko Karanušić (Canada) Frédéric Niemeyer (Germany) Dominik Meffert (South Africa) Rik de Voest
Jan 21	Hilton Waikoloa Village USTA Challenger; Waikoloa, USA; Hard $35,000+H	(Chinese Taipei) Yen-Hsun Lu; 6–2, 6–0	(United States) Vincent Spadea	(Switzerland) Stéphane Bohli (Argentina) Leonardo Mayer	(Japan) Go Soeda (United States) Kevin Kim (United States) Scoville Jenkins (Germany) Denis Gremelmayr
Jan 21	Hilton Waikoloa Village USTA Challenger; Waikoloa, USA; Hard $35,000+H	(United States) Lipsky (United States) Martin; 6–4, 5–7, 10–7	(Japan) Iwabuchi (Japan) Soeda	(Switzerland) Stéphane Bohli (Argentina) Leonardo Mayer	(Japan) Go Soeda (United States) Kevin Kim (United States) Scoville Jenkins (Germany) Denis Gremelmayr
Jan 28	AT&T Challenger of Dallas; Dallas, USA; Hard (indoor) $50,000	(United States) Amer Delic; 6–4, 7–5	(Switzerland) Stéphane Bohli	(United States) Robert Kendrick (United States) Brendan Evans	(United States) Rajeev Ram (United States) Kevin Kim (Argentina) Leonardo Mayer (United States) Ryan Sweeting
Jan 28	AT&T Challenger of Dallas; Dallas, USA; Hard (indoor) $50,000	(Germany) Dorsch (Germany) Phau; 6–4, 6–4	(United States) Lipsky (United States) Martin	(United States) Robert Kendrick (United States) Brendan Evans	(United States) Rajeev Ram (United States) Kevin Kim (Argentina) Leonardo Mayer (United States) Ryan Sweeting
Jan 28	China TCL Challenger; Guangzhou, China; Hard $50,000	(Sweden) Björn Rehnquist; 2–6, 7–6^{(7–4)}, 6–2	(Thailand) Danai Udomchoke	(Australia) Chris Guccione (France) David Guez	(Chinese Taipei) Ti Chen (Austria) Philipp Oswald (France) Laurent Recouderc (Monaco) Jean-René Lisnard
Jan 28	China TCL Challenger; Guangzhou, China; Hard $50,000	(China) Yu (China) Zeng; 1–6, 6–3, 10–5	(United States) King (Thailand) Udomchoke	(Australia) Chris Guccione (France) David Guez	(Chinese Taipei) Ti Chen (Austria) Philipp Oswald (France) Laurent Recouderc (Monaco) Jean-René Lisnard
Jan 28	KGHM Dialog Polish Indoors; Wrocław, Poland; Hard (indoor) $106,500+H	(Belgium) Kristof Vliegen; 6–4 3–6 6–3	(Austria) Jürgen Melzer	(Germany) Rainer Schüttler (Italy) Simone Bolelli	(Czech Republic) Radek Štěpánek (Slovakia) Karol Beck (Spain) Guillermo García-López (Ukraine) Sergiy Stakhovsky
Jan 28	KGHM Dialog Polish Indoors; Wrocław, Poland; Hard (indoor) $106,500+H	(United States) Cerretani (Czech Republic) Rosol; 6–7(7), 6–3, 10–7	(Austria) Eschauer (Austria) Melzer	(Germany) Rainer Schüttler (Italy) Simone Bolelli	(Czech Republic) Radek Štěpánek (Slovakia) Karol Beck (Spain) Guillermo García-López (Ukraine) Sergiy Stakhovsky

=== February ===
Week of	Tournament	Winner	Runner-up	Semifinalists	Quarterfinalists
Feb 4	Internazionali di Tennis di Bergamo Trofeo Baci & Abracci; Bergamo, Italy; Hard (indoor) $125,000+H	(Italy) Andreas Seppi; 2–6, 6–2, 7–5	(France) Julien Benneteau	(France) Fabrice Santoro (France) Nicolas Mahut	(Russia) Igor Kunitsyn (France) Thierry Ascione (France) Jérémy Chardy (France) Édouard Roger-Vasselin
Feb 4	Internazionali di Tennis di Bergamo Trofeo Baci & Abracci; Bergamo, Italy; Hard (indoor) $125,000+H	(Italy) Bolelli (Italy) Seppi; 6–3, 6–0	(United States) Cerretani (Slovakia) Zelenay	(France) Fabrice Santoro (France) Nicolas Mahut	(Russia) Igor Kunitsyn (France) Thierry Ascione (France) Jérémy Chardy (France) Édouard Roger-Vasselin
Feb 11	GEMAX Open; Belgrade, Serbia; Carpet (indoor) €106,500+H	(Croatia) Roko Karanušić; 5–7, 6–1, 7–6^{(7–5)}	(Germany) Philipp Petzschner	(Serbia) Viktor Troicki (Slovakia) Karol Beck	(Serbia) Ilija Bozoljac (Australia) Robert Smeets (Italy) Federico Luzzi (Serbia) Dušan Vemić
Feb 11	GEMAX Open; Belgrade, Serbia; Carpet (indoor) €106,500+H	(Italy) Cipolla (Greece) Economidis; 4–6, 6–2, 10–8	(Italy) Motti (Slovakia) Polášek	(Serbia) Viktor Troicki (Slovakia) Karol Beck	(Serbia) Ilija Bozoljac (Australia) Robert Smeets (Italy) Federico Luzzi (Serbia) Dušan Vemić
Feb 11	South African Airways Open; East London, South Africa; Hard $125,000+H	(Croatia) Ivan Ljubičić; 7–6^{(7–2)}, 6–4	(Austria) Stefan Koubek	(Sweden) Thomas Johansson (Portugal) Frederico Gil	(South Africa) Rik de Voest (France) Josselin Ouanna (France) Gary Lugassy (France) Jérémy Chardy
Feb 11	South African Airways Open; East London, South Africa; Hard $125,000+H	(Sweden) Björkman (Zimbabwe) Ullyett; 6–2, 6–2	(Sweden) Johansson (Austria) Koubek	(Sweden) Thomas Johansson (Portugal) Frederico Gil	(South Africa) Rik de Voest (France) Josselin Ouanna (France) Gary Lugassy (France) Jérémy Chardy
Feb 18	Internationaux du Doubs – Open de Franche-Comté; Besançon, France; Hard (indoor) €85,000+H	(France) Marc Gicquel; 7–6^{(7–2)}, 6–4	(Austria) Alexander Peya	(Slovakia) Karol Beck (United States) Kevin Kim	(Uzbekistan) Denis Istomin (Germany) Philipp Petzschner (Russia) Alexander Kudryavtsev (France) Adrian Mannarino
Feb 18	Internationaux du Doubs – Open de Franche-Comté; Besançon, France; Hard (indoor) €85,000+H	(Germany) Petzschner (Austria) Peya; 6–3, 6–1	(Switzerland) Allegro (Romania) Tecău	(Slovakia) Karol Beck (United States) Kevin Kim	(Uzbekistan) Denis Istomin (Germany) Philipp Petzschner (Russia) Alexander Kudryavtsev (France) Adrian Mannarino
Feb 25	Challenger DCNS de Cherbourg; Cherbourg-en-Cotentin, France; Carpet (indoor) €42,500+H	(France) Thierry Ascione; 7–5, 7–6^{(7–5)}	(Denmark) Kristian Pless	(France) Adrian Mannarino (United Kingdom) Alex Bogdanovic	(Czech Republic) Lukáš Dlouhý (France) David Guez (Slovakia) Lukáš Lacko (United States) Kevin Kim
Feb 25	Challenger DCNS de Cherbourg; Cherbourg-en-Cotentin, France; Carpet (indoor) €42,500+H	(Romania) Mergea (Romania) Tecău; 7–5, 7–5	(Switzerland) Scherrer (Brazil) Torres	(France) Adrian Mannarino (United Kingdom) Alex Bogdanovic	(Czech Republic) Lukáš Dlouhý (France) David Guez (Slovakia) Lukáš Lacko (United States) Kevin Kim
Feb 25	Challenger de Providencia; Santiago, Chile; Clay $35,000+H	(Brazil) Thomaz Bellucci; 6–4, 7–6^{(7–3)}	(Argentina) Eduardo Schwank	(Brazil) João Souza (Argentina) Diego Junqueira	(Spain) Rubén Ramírez Hidalgo (Italy) Simone Vagnozzi (Argentina) Sebastián Decoud (Canada) Peter Polansky
Feb 25	Challenger de Providencia; Santiago, Chile; Clay $35,000+H	(Argentina) Hood (Argentina) Schwank; 6–3, 6–3	(Argentina) Dabul (Netherlands Antilles) Rojer	(Brazil) João Souza (Argentina) Diego Junqueira	(Spain) Rubén Ramírez Hidalgo (Italy) Simone Vagnozzi (Argentina) Sebastián Decoud (Canada) Peter Polansky
Feb 25	5.Volkswagen Challenger; Wolfsburg, Germany; Clay (indoor) €30,000+H	(Republic of Ireland) Louk Sorensen; 7–6^{(9–7)}, 4–6, 6–4	(Uzbekistan) Farrukh Dustov	(Kazakhstan) Mikhail Kukushkin (Germany) Daniel Brands	(Netherlands) Jesse Huta Galung (Germany) Andreas Beck (Russia) Mikhail Ledovskikh (Germany) Simon Stadler
Feb 25	5.Volkswagen Challenger; Wolfsburg, Germany; Clay (indoor) €30,000+H	(Australia) Ball (South Africa) van der Merwe; 7–6^{(7–5)}, 6–3	(United Kingdom) Bloomfield (United Kingdom) Skupski	(Kazakhstan) Mikhail Kukushkin (Germany) Daniel Brands	(Netherlands) Jesse Huta Galung (Germany) Andreas Beck (Russia) Mikhail Ledovskikh (Germany) Simon Stadler

=== March ===
Week of	Tournament	Winner	Runner-up	Semi finalists	Quarter finalists
Mar 3	Bancolombia Open; Bogotá, Colombia; Clay $125,000+H	(Brazil) Marcos Daniel; 6–3, 1–6, 6–3	(Spain) Iván Navarro	(Argentina) Martín Vassallo Argüello (Austria) Daniel Köllerer	(Argentina) Diego Hartfield (United States) Robert Kendrick (Colombia) Juan Sebastián Cabal (Spain) Fernando Vicente
Mar 3	Bancolombia Open; Bogotá, Colombia; Clay $125,000+H	(Argentina) Dabul (Paraguay) Delgado; 7–6^{(7–5)}, 6–4	(Brazil) Bellucci (Brazil) Soares	(Argentina) Martín Vassallo Argüello (Austria) Daniel Köllerer	(Argentina) Diego Hartfield (United States) Robert Kendrick (Colombia) Juan Sebastián Cabal (Spain) Fernando Vicente
Mar 3	Shimadzu All Japan Indoor Tennis Championships; Kyoto, Japan; Carpet $35,000+H	(Japan) Go Soeda; 7–6^{(7–0)}, 2–6, 6–4	(Germany) Matthias Bachinger	(Chinese Taipei) Yen-Hsun Lu (Austria) Martin Slanar	(Germany) Daniel Brands (United Kingdom) Richard Bloomfield (United States) Brendan Evans (Australia) Robert Smeets
Mar 3	Shimadzu All Japan Indoor Tennis Championships; Kyoto, Japan; Carpet $35,000+H	(Germany) Kindlmann (Austria) Slanar; 6–1, 7–5	(Japan) Kondo (Japan) Soeda	(Chinese Taipei) Yen-Hsun Lu (Austria) Martin Slanar	(Germany) Daniel Brands (United Kingdom) Richard Bloomfield (United States) Brendan Evans (Australia) Robert Smeets
Mar 10	Abierto Internacional de Salinas; Salinas, Ecuador; Hard $35,000+H	(Peru) Iván Miranda; 6–2, 6–2	(Argentina) Diego Junqueira	(Paraguay) Ramón Delgado (Italy) Paolo Lorenzi	(Argentina) Brian Dabul (United States) Jesse Witten (United States) Hugo Armando (Argentina) Eduardo Schwank
Mar 10	Abierto Internacional de Salinas; Salinas, Ecuador; Hard $35,000+H	(Brazil) Silva (Brazil) Zampieri; 7–6^{(8–6)}, 6–2	(Argentina) Decoud (Belgium) Norman	(Paraguay) Ramón Delgado (Italy) Paolo Lorenzi	(Argentina) Brian Dabul (United States) Jesse Witten (United States) Hugo Armando (Argentina) Eduardo Schwank
Mar 10	Morocco Tennis Tour – Tanger; Tanger, Morocco; Clay €30,000+H	(Spain) Marcel Granollers; 6–4, 6–4	(Spain) Daniel Gimeno-Traver	(Belgium) Christophe Rochus (Austria) Rainer Eitzinger	(Uzbekistan) Denis Istomin (Spain) Alberto Martín (Czech Republic) Jan Minář (Morocco) Mounir El Aarej
Mar 10	Morocco Tennis Tour – Tanger; Tanger, Morocco; Clay €30,000+H	(Spain) López (Spain) Trujillo-Soler; 6–3, 6–7^{(5–7)}, 11–9	(Spain) López Jaén (Spain) Navarro	(Belgium) Christophe Rochus (Austria) Rainer Eitzinger	(Uzbekistan) Denis Istomin (Spain) Alberto Martín (Czech Republic) Jan Minář (Morocco) Mounir El Aarej
Mar 17	Morocco Tennis Tour – Meknes; Meknes, Morocco; Clay €30,000+H	(Spain) Iván Navarro; 6–4, 6–4	(Czech Republic) Jiří Vaněk	(France) Thierry Ascione (Spain) Alberto Martín	(Uzbekistan) Denis Istomin (Belgium) Christophe Rochus (Spain) Marc López (France) Jérémy Chardy
Mar 17	Morocco Tennis Tour – Meknes; Meknes, Morocco; Clay €30,000+H	(Spain) Martín (Spain) Muñoz-de la Nava; 6–4, 6–7^{(2–7)}, 10–6	(Russia) Elgin (Kazakhstan) Schukin	(France) Thierry Ascione (Spain) Alberto Martín	(Uzbekistan) Denis Istomin (Belgium) Christophe Rochus (Spain) Marc López (France) Jérémy Chardy
Mar 17	San Luis Potosí Challenger; San Luis Potosí, Mexico; Clay $50,000+H	(Argentina) Brian Dabul; W/O	(Argentina) Mariano Puerta	(Brazil) João Souza (Mexico) Santiago González	(Colombia) Juan Sebastián Cabal (Argentina) Leonardo Mayer (Spain) Fernando Vicente (Germany) Simon Stadler
Mar 17	San Luis Potosí Challenger; San Luis Potosí, Mexico; Clay $50,000+H	(United States) Parrott (Slovakia) Polášek; 6–2, 6–1	(Netherlands Antilles) Rojer (Brazil) Torres	(Brazil) João Souza (Mexico) Santiago González	(Colombia) Juan Sebastián Cabal (Argentina) Leonardo Mayer (Spain) Fernando Vicente (Germany) Simon Stadler
Mar 17	BH Telecom Indoors; Sarajevo, Bosnia and Herzegovina; Hard (indoor) €30,000+H	(Germany) Andreas Beck; 6–3, 7–6(8)	(Austria) Alexander Peya	(France) Gary Lugassy (Czech Republic) Pavel Šnobel	(Croatia) Ivan Cerović (Netherlands) Matwe Middelkoop (Austria) Martin Slanar (Germany) Daniel Brands
Mar 17	BH Telecom Indoors; Sarajevo, Bosnia and Herzegovina; Hard (indoor) €30,000+H	(Sweden) Brunström (Denmark) Nielsen; 6–4, 7–6^{(7–4)}	(Austria) Peya (Croatia) Zovko	(France) Gary Lugassy (Czech Republic) Pavel Šnobel	(Croatia) Ivan Cerović (Netherlands) Matwe Middelkoop (Austria) Martin Slanar (Germany) Daniel Brands
Mar 17	BMW Tennis Championship; Sunrise, Florida; Hard $100,000+H	(Netherlands) Robin Haase; 5–7, 7–5, 6–1	(France) Sébastien Grosjean	(Australia) Chris Guccione (Austria) Jürgen Melzer	(Chile) Fernando González (Serbia) Janko Tipsarević (Italy) Potito Starace (Czech Republic) Ivo Minář
Mar 17	BMW Tennis Championship; Sunrise, Florida; Hard $100,000+H	(Serbia) Tipsarević (Serbia) Vemić; 7–6^{(7–3)}, 6–4	(Belgium) Vliegen (Netherlands) Wessels	(Australia) Chris Guccione (Austria) Jürgen Melzer	(Chile) Fernando González (Serbia) Janko Tipsarević (Italy) Potito Starace (Czech Republic) Ivo Minář
Mar 24	Open Barletta Citta' della Disfida – Trofeo Angel Devil; Barletta, Italy; Clay €42,500+H	(Kazakhstan) Mikhail Kukushkin; 6–4, 6–4	(Serbia) Boris Pašanski	(Kazakhstan) Yuri Schukin (France) Nicolas Devilder	(Italy) Gianluca Naso (Spain) Marcel Granollers (Spain) Daniel Gimeno-Traver (Spain) Alberto Martín
Mar 24	Open Barletta Citta' della Disfida – Trofeo Angel Devil; Barletta, Italy; Clay €42,500+H	(Italy) Cipolla (Spain) Granollers; 6–3, 2–6, 11–9	(Austria) Marach (Slovakia) Mertiňák	(Kazakhstan) Yuri Schukin (France) Nicolas Devilder	(Italy) Gianluca Naso (Spain) Marcel Granollers (Spain) Daniel Gimeno-Traver (Spain) Alberto Martín
Mar 24	AGT Challenger; León, Mexico; Hard $50,000+H	(Mexico) Bruno Echagaray; 6–0, 3–6 7–6^{(8–6)}	(Brazil) Ricardo Mello	(Argentina) Leonardo Mayer (Argentina) Brian Dabul	(Argentina) Horacio Zeballos (Japan) Go Soeda (Italy) Paolo Lorenzi (Republic of Ireland) Louk Sorensen
Mar 24	AGT Challenger; León, Mexico; Hard $50,000+H	(United States) Parrott (Slovakia) Polášek; 6–4, 6–1	(United States) Evans (United States) Kuznetsov	(Argentina) Leonardo Mayer (Argentina) Brian Dabul	(Argentina) Horacio Zeballos (Japan) Go Soeda (Italy) Paolo Lorenzi (Republic of Ireland) Louk Sorensen
Mar 31	Napoli Tennis Cup; Naples, Italy; Clay €85,000+H	(Italy) Potito Starace; 6–4, 4–6, 7–6^{(7–3)}	(Brazil) Marcos Daniel	(Spain) Pablo Andújar (France) Olivier Patience	(France) Florent Serra (Netherlands) Thiemo de Bakker (Portugal) Frederico Gil (South Korea) Woong-Sun Jun
Mar 31	Napoli Tennis Cup; Naples, Italy; Clay €85,000+H	(Czech Republic) Cibulec (Czech Republic) Levinský; 6–1, 6–3	(Portugal) Gil (Peru) Horna	(Spain) Pablo Andújar (France) Olivier Patience	(France) Florent Serra (Netherlands) Thiemo de Bakker (Portugal) Frederico Gil (South Korea) Woong-Sun Jun
Mar 31	Open Prévadiès; Saint-Brieuc, France; Clay $35,000+H	(Belgium) Christophe Rochus; 6–2, 4–6, 6–1	(Spain) Marcel Granollers	(Argentina) Diego Junqueira (Croatia) Roko Karanušić	(Romania) Adrian Cruciat (Spain) Marc López (Germany) Björn Phau (France) Josselin Ouanna
Mar 31	Open Prévadiès; Saint-Brieuc, France; Clay $35,000+H	(Romania) Cruciat (Spain) Muñoz-de la Nava; 4–6, 6–4, 10–4	(China) Yu (China) Zeng	(Argentina) Diego Junqueira (Croatia) Roko Karanušić	(Romania) Adrian Cruciat (Spain) Marc López (Germany) Björn Phau (France) Josselin Ouanna

=== April ===
Week of	Tournament	Winner	Runner-up	Semi finalists	Quarter finalists
Apr 7	Puerto Rico Challenger Tennis Tournament; Humacao, Puerto Rico; Hard $50,000	(Luxembourg) Gilles Müller; 7–5, 7–6(2)	(Peru) Iván Miranda	(United States) Tim Smyczek (Brazil) Thiago Alves	(Austria) Martin Fischer (United States) Robert Kendrick (United States) Amer Delic (United States) Kevin Kim
Apr 7	Puerto Rico Challenger Tennis Tournament; Humacao, Puerto Rico; Hard $50,000	(United States) Ram (United States) Reynolds; 6–3, 6–4	(United States) Cook (United States) Kim	(United States) Tim Smyczek (Brazil) Thiago Alves	(Austria) Martin Fischer (United States) Robert Kendrick (United States) Amer Delic (United States) Kevin Kim
Apr 7	Mitsubishi Electric Europe Cup; Monza, Italy; Clay $35,000+H	(Spain) Albert Montañés; 3–6, 7–6(1), 6–3	(Spain) Alberto Martín	(Spain) Santiago Ventura (Serbia) Viktor Troicki	(Spain) David Marrero (Italy) Andrea Arnaboldi (France) Nicolas Devilder (Serbia) Ilija Bozoljac
Apr 7	Mitsubishi Electric Europe Cup; Monza, Italy; Clay $35,000+H	(Italy) Galvani (Spain) Martín; 7–5, 2–6, 10–3	(Germany) Gremelmayr (Germany) Greul	(Spain) Santiago Ventura (Serbia) Viktor Troicki	(Spain) David Marrero (Italy) Andrea Arnaboldi (France) Nicolas Devilder (Serbia) Ilija Bozoljac
Apr 14	Status Athens Open; Athens, Greece; Clay $50,000+H	(Netherlands) Martin Verkerk; 6–3, 6–3	(Romania) Adrian Cruciat	(South Africa) Kevin Anderson (Germany) Simon Stadler	(Spain) Marc López (Uzbekistan) Denis Istomin (Slovakia) Lukáš Lacko (Czech Republic) Jan Minář
Apr 14	Status Athens Open; Athens, Greece; Clay $50,000+H	(Spain) López (Spain) Trujillo-Soler; 6–4, 6–4	(Greece) Economidis (Greece) Jakupovic	(South Africa) Kevin Anderson (Germany) Simon Stadler	(Spain) Marc López (Uzbekistan) Denis Istomin (Slovakia) Lukáš Lacko (Czech Republic) Jan Minář
Apr 14	Busan Open Challenger; Busan, Korea; Hard $75,000+H	(Japan) Go Soeda; 6–2 ret.	(Chinese Taipei) Yen-Hsun Lu	(South Africa) Rik de Voest (Denmark) Kristian Pless	(Australia) Nick Lindahl (Poland) Łukasz Kubot (Thailand) Danai Udomchoke (Czech Republic) Pavel Šnobel
Apr 14	Busan Open Challenger; Busan, Korea; Hard $75,000+H	(South Africa) de Voest (Poland) Kubot; 6–3, 6–3	(Australia) Feeney (Australia) Junaid	(South Africa) Rik de Voest (Denmark) Kristian Pless	(Australia) Nick Lindahl (Poland) Łukasz Kubot (Thailand) Danai Udomchoke (Czech Republic) Pavel Šnobel
Apr 14	Challenger Internazionale Dell'Insubria; Chiasso, Switzerland; Clay $35,000+H	(Morocco) Younes El Aynaoui; 7–6(2), 6–3	(Spain) Alberto Martín	(France) Éric Prodon (France) Nicolas Devilder	(Argentina) Juan-Martín Aranguren (Austria) Rainer Eitzinger (Germany) Simon Greul (Argentina) Sebastián Decoud
Apr 14	Challenger Internazionale Dell'Insubria; Chiasso, Switzerland; Clay $35,000+H	(Argentina) Hood (Spain) Martín; 4–6, 7–6(4), 11–9	(Italy) Colangelo (Italy) Crugnola	(France) Éric Prodon (France) Nicolas Devilder	(Argentina) Juan-Martín Aranguren (Austria) Rainer Eitzinger (Germany) Simon Greul (Argentina) Sebastián Decoud
Apr 14	Aberto Santa Catarina De Tenis; Florianópolis, Brazil; Clay $35,000+H	(Brazil) Thomaz Bellucci; 4–6, 6–4, 6–2	(Brazil) Franco Ferreiro	(Argentina) Brian Dabul (Brazil) Ricardo Mello	(Canada) Peter Polansky (Brazil) Ricardo Hocevar (Brazil) Rogério Dutra da Silva (Brazil) Júlio Silva
Apr 14	Aberto Santa Catarina De Tenis; Florianópolis, Brazil; Clay $35,000+H	(Chile) García (Argentina) Mayer; 6–2, 6–0	(Brazil) Bellucci (Brazil) Soares	(Argentina) Brian Dabul (Brazil) Ricardo Mello	(Canada) Peter Polansky (Brazil) Ricardo Hocevar (Brazil) Rogério Dutra da Silva (Brazil) Júlio Silva
Apr 14	Abierto Internacional del Bicentenario León; Mexico City, Mexico; Hard $35,000+H	(Poland) Dawid Olejniczak; 6–4, 6–3	(United States) Sam Warburg	(Switzerland) George Bastl (United Kingdom) Joshua Goodall	(United States) Alberto Francis (United States) Travis Rettenmaier (Mexico) Bruno Echagaray (Australia) Robert Smeets
Apr 14	Abierto Internacional del Bicentenario León; Mexico City, Mexico; Hard $35,000+H	(Australia) Ball (Australia) Smeets; 6–7(5), 6–4, 10–3	(United Kingdom) Bamford (United Kingdom) Goodall	(Switzerland) George Bastl (United Kingdom) Joshua Goodall	(United States) Alberto Francis (United States) Travis Rettenmaier (Mexico) Bruno Echagaray (Australia) Robert Smeets
Apr 14	Tallahassee Tennis Challenger; Tallahassee, USA; Hard $50,000	(United States) Bobby Reynolds; 5–7, 6–4, 6–3	(United States) Robert Kendrick	(Germany) Benjamin Becker (United States) Alex Kuznetsov	(United States) Kevin Kim (United States) Ryan Sweeting (United States) Scoville Jenkins (Brazil) Thiago Alves
Apr 14	Tallahassee Tennis Challenger; Tallahassee, USA; Hard $50,000	(United States) Ram (United States) Reynolds; W/O	(United States) Kendrick (United States) Sweeting	(Germany) Benjamin Becker (United States) Alex Kuznetsov	(United States) Kevin Kim (United States) Ryan Sweeting (United States) Scoville Jenkins (Brazil) Thiago Alves
Apr 21	Price Leblanc Lexus Pro Tennis Classic; Baton Rouge, Louisiana, USA; Hard $50,000	(United States) Bobby Reynolds; 6–3, 6–7(3), 7–5	(Russia) Igor Kunitsyn	(United States) Amer Delic (New Zealand) Rubin Statham	(Austria) Martin Fischer (United States) Kevin Kim (Latvia) Andis Juška (United States) Alex Kuznetsov
Apr 21	Price Leblanc Lexus Pro Tennis Classic; Baton Rouge, Louisiana, USA; Hard $50,000	(United States) Simmonds (United States) Smyczek; 2–6, 6–1, 10–4	(United States) Harrison (United States) Venus	(United States) Amer Delic (New Zealand) Rubin Statham	(Austria) Martin Fischer (United States) Kevin Kim (Latvia) Andis Juška (United States) Alex Kuznetsov
Apr 21	XL Bermuda Open; Paget, Bermuda; Clay $100,000+H	(Japan) Kei Nishikori; 2–6, 7–5, 7–6(5)	(Serbia) Viktor Troicki	(Australia) Peter Luczak (Argentina) Carlos Berlocq	(Latvia) Ernests Gulbis (United States) Donald Young (Spain) Marcel Granollers (United States) Vincent Spadea
Apr 21	XL Bermuda Open; Paget, Bermuda; Clay $100,000+H	(Israel) Levy (United States) Thomas; 6–7(4), 6–4, 11–9	(South Africa) Haggard (Australia) Luczak	(Australia) Peter Luczak (Argentina) Carlos Berlocq	(Latvia) Ernests Gulbis (United States) Donald Young (Spain) Marcel Granollers (United States) Vincent Spadea
Apr 21	Trofeo Paolo Corazzi; Cremona, Italy; Hard €30,000+H	(Argentina) Eduardo Schwank; 6–3, 6–4	(Germany) Björn Phau	(Germany) Simon Stadler (Spain) Adrián Menéndez-Maceiras	(Switzerland) Stéphane Bohli (South Africa) Rik de Voest (Australia) Alun Jones (Thailand) Danai Udomchoke
Apr 21	Trofeo Paolo Corazzi; Cremona, Italy; Hard €30,000+H	(Serbia) Vemić (Argentina) Schwank; 6–3, 6–2	(Romania) Mergea (Romania) Tecău	(Germany) Simon Stadler (Spain) Adrián Menéndez-Maceiras	(Switzerland) Stéphane Bohli (South Africa) Rik de Voest (Australia) Alun Jones (Thailand) Danai Udomchoke
Apr 28	Open Isla de Lanzarote; Lanzarote, Spain; Hard $50,000+H	(Switzerland) Stéphane Bohli; 6–3, 6–4	(Chinese Taipei) Yen-Hsun Lu	(Germany) Björn Phau (Denmark) Kristian Pless	(Sweden) Filip Prpic (South Africa) Rik de Voest (Australia) Robert Smeets (United Kingdom) Alex Bogdanovic
Apr 28	Open Isla de Lanzarote; Lanzarote, Spain; Hard $50,000+H	(South Africa) Voest (Poland) Kubot; 6–2, 7–6(2)	(Luxembourg) Müller (Pakistan) Qureshi	(Germany) Björn Phau (Denmark) Kristian Pless	(Sweden) Filip Prpic (South Africa) Rik de Voest (Australia) Robert Smeets (United Kingdom) Alex Bogdanovic
Apr 28	ECM Prague Open; Prague, Czech Republic; Clay $75,000	(Czech Republic) Jan Hernych; 4–6, 6–2, 6–4	(Czech Republic) Lukáš Dlouhý	(Israel) Harel Levy (Czech Republic) Bohdan Ulihrach	(Germany) Dominik Meffert (Czech Republic) Jan Minář (Czech Republic) Lukáš Rosol (Argentina) Brian Dabul
Apr 28	ECM Prague Open; Prague, Czech Republic; Clay $75,000	(Czech Republic) Dlouhý (Czech Republic) Pála; 6–7(2), 6–4, 10–6	(Czech Republic) D. Karol (Czech Republic) Pospíšil	(Israel) Harel Levy (Czech Republic) Bohdan Ulihrach	(Germany) Dominik Meffert (Czech Republic) Jan Minář (Czech Republic) Lukáš Rosol (Argentina) Brian Dabul
Apr 28	Garden Open Roma; Rome, Italy; Clay €30,000+H; Singles – Doubles	(Argentina) Eduardo Schwank; 6–3, 6–7(2), 7–6(3)	(France) Éric Prodon	(France) Adrian Mannarino (Austria) Daniel Köllerer	(Argentina) Cristian Villagrán (Italy) Francesco Aldi (Germany) Simon Greul (France) David Guez
Apr 28	Garden Open Roma; Rome, Italy; Clay €30,000+H; Singles – Doubles	(Italy) Cipolla (Italy) Vagnozzi; 6–3, 6–3	(Italy) Lorenzi (Italy) Petrazzuolo	(France) Adrian Mannarino (Austria) Daniel Köllerer	(Argentina) Cristian Villagrán (Italy) Francesco Aldi (Germany) Simon Greul (France) David Guez
Apr 28	Tunis Open; Tunis, Tunisia; Clay $125,000+H	(Brazil) Thomaz Bellucci; 6–2, 6–4	(Serbia) Dušan Vemić	(Chile) Nicolás Massú (France) Florent Serra	(France) Julien Benneteau (Chile) Paul Capdeville (Portugal) Frederico Gil (Spain) Marc Fornell-Mestres
Apr 28	Tunis Open; Tunis, Tunisia; Clay $125,000+H	(Brazil) Bellucci (Brazil) Soares; 6–3, 6–4	(Switzerland) Scherrer (France) Tourte	(Chile) Nicolás Massú (France) Florent Serra	(France) Julien Benneteau (Chile) Paul Capdeville (Portugal) Frederico Gil (Spain) Marc Fornell-Mestres

=== May ===
Week of	Tournament	Winner	Runner-up	Semi finalists	Quarter finalist
May 5	Ostdeutscher Sparkassen Cup; Dresden, Germany; Clay $50,000	(Germany) Andreas Beck; 2–6, 6–3, 7–5	(South Korea) Woong-Sun Jun	(Germany) Rainer Schüttler (Germany) Simon Greul	(Germany) Daniel Brands (Netherlands) Boy Westerhof (Germany) Florian Mayer (Uzbekistan) Denis Istomin
May 5	Ostdeutscher Sparkassen Cup; Dresden, Germany; Clay $50,000	(Germany) Brands (South Korea) Jun; 2–6, 7–6(4), 10–6	(Serbia) Bozoljac (Serbia) Vemić	(Germany) Rainer Schüttler (Germany) Simon Greul	(Germany) Daniel Brands (Netherlands) Boy Westerhof (Germany) Florian Mayer (Uzbekistan) Denis Istomin
May 5	Prosperita Open; Ostrava, Czech Republic; Clay $42,500+H	(Czech Republic) Jiří Vaněk; 6–3, 4–6, 6–1	(Czech Republic) Jan Hernych	(Argentina) Brian Dabul (Czech Republic) Lukáš Rosol	(Austria) Oliver Marach (France) Nicolas Devilder (Romania) Adrian Cruciat (Argentina) Juan-Martín Aranguren
May 5	Prosperita Open; Ostrava, Czech Republic; Clay $42,500+H	(Ukraine) Stakhovsky (Czech Republic) Zíb; 7–6(6), 3–6, 14–12	(Czech Republic) Hernych (Slovakia) Zelenay	(Argentina) Brian Dabul (Czech Republic) Lukáš Rosol	(Austria) Oliver Marach (France) Nicolas Devilder (Romania) Adrian Cruciat (Argentina) Juan-Martín Aranguren
May 5	Morocco Tennis Tour – Rabat; Rabat, Morocco; Clay $42,500+H	(Brazil) Thomaz Bellucci; 6–2, 6–2	(Argentina) Martín Vassallo Argüello	(Spain) Guillermo García-López (Canada) Peter Polansky	(Italy) Francesco Piccari (Chile) Paul Capdeville (France) Josselin Ouanna (Slovakia) Ivo Klec
May 5	Morocco Tennis Tour – Rabat; Rabat, Morocco; Clay $42,500+H	(Spain) Garcia-Lopez (Argentina) Hood; 6–3, 6–2	(Spain) Fornell-Mestres (Brazil) Zampieri	(Spain) Guillermo García-López (Canada) Peter Polansky	(Italy) Francesco Piccari (Chile) Paul Capdeville (France) Josselin Ouanna (Slovakia) Ivo Klec
May 5	Rijeka Open; Rijeka, Croatia; Clay $30,000+H	(Chile) Nicolás Massú; 6–2, 6–2	(Belgium) Christophe Rochus	(Belgium) Dick Norman (Serbia) Viktor Troicki	(Spain) Óscar Hernández (Czech Republic) Jaroslav Pospíšil (Croatia) Roko Karanušić (Switzerland) Michael Lammer
May 5	Rijeka Open; Rijeka, Croatia; Clay $30,000+H	(Czech Republic) Karol (Czech Republic) Pospíšil; 6–4, 6–4	(United States) Kuznetsov (Belgium) Norman	(Belgium) Dick Norman (Serbia) Viktor Troicki	(Spain) Óscar Hernández (Czech Republic) Jaroslav Pospíšil (Croatia) Roko Karanušić (Switzerland) Michael Lammer
May 5	Isla de Gran Canaria – Ciudad de Telde; Telde, Spain; Clay $30,000+H	(Russia) Teymuraz Gabashvili; 6–4, 4–6, 6–1	(Spain) Pablo Andújar	(Germany) Simon Stadler (Spain) Daniel Gimeno-Traver	(Spain) Miguel Ángel López Jaén (Republic of Ireland) Louk Sorensen (Spain) Marc López (Spain) Iván Navarro
May 5	Isla de Gran Canaria – Ciudad de Telde; Telde, Spain; Clay $30,000+H	(Spain) Gimeno-Traver (Spain) Muñoz-de la Nava; 6–3, 6–1	(Spain) López (Spain) Santos	(Germany) Simon Stadler (Spain) Daniel Gimeno-Traver	(Spain) Miguel Ángel López Jaén (Republic of Ireland) Louk Sorensen (Spain) Marc López (Spain) Iván Navarro
May 5	Men's Pro Challenger at Tunica National; Tunica, USA; Clay $50,000	(Peru) Iván Miranda; 6–4, 6–4	(Australia) Carsten Ball	(United States) Scoville Jenkins (Belgium) Ruben Bemelmans	(United States) Tim Smyczek (United States) Wayne Odesnik (United States) John Isner (United States) Todd Widom
May 5	Men's Pro Challenger at Tunica National; Tunica, USA; Clay $50,000	(Serbia) Obradović (South Africa) van der Merwe; 7–6(5), 6–4	(United States) DeHeart (United States) Widom	(United States) Scoville Jenkins (Belgium) Ruben Bemelmans	(United States) Tim Smyczek (United States) Wayne Odesnik (United States) John Isner (United States) Todd Widom
May 12	Pharma Medico Open; Aarhus, Denmark; Clay $42,500+H	(Spain) Daniel Gimeno-Traver; 7–5, 7–5	(France) Éric Prodon	(Spain) Óscar Hernández (Spain) Iván Navarro	(Sweden) Filip Prpic (Romania) Victor Crivoi (Argentina) Nicolás Todero (Denmark) Frederik Nielsen
May 12	Pharma Medico Open; Aarhus, Denmark; Clay $42,500+H	(Poland) Olejniczak (Netherlands Antilles) Rojer; 7–6(4), 2–6, 10–8	(Denmark) Nielsen (Denmark) Pedersen	(Spain) Óscar Hernández (Spain) Iván Navarro	(Sweden) Filip Prpic (Romania) Victor Crivoi (Argentina) Nicolás Todero (Denmark) Frederik Nielsen
May 12	BNP Paribas Primrose; Bordeaux, France; Clay €85,000+H	(Argentina) Eduardo Schwank; 6–2, 6–2	(Russia) Igor Kunitsyn	(France) Arnaud Clément (Spain) Daniel Muñoz-de la Nava	(Brazil) Thomaz Bellucci (France) Jordanne Doble (Czech Republic) Jan Hernych (France) Marc Gicquel
May 12	BNP Paribas Primrose; Bordeaux, France; Clay €85,000+H	(Argentina) Hartfield (Argentina) Roitman; 6–4, 6–4	(Poland) Bednarek (Serbia) Vemić	(France) Arnaud Clément (Spain) Daniel Muñoz-de la Nava	(Brazil) Thomaz Bellucci (France) Jordanne Doble (Czech Republic) Jan Hernych (France) Marc Gicquel
May 12	Hurricane Tennis Open; Bradenton, USA; Clay $50,000	(United States) Jesse Levine; 6–3, 5–7, 7–6(3)	(United States) Robert Kendrick	(United States) Nick Monroe (Mexico) Santiago González	(Peru) Iván Miranda (United States) Lester Cook (Argentina) Mariano Puerta (United States) Stephen Bass
May 12	Hurricane Tennis Open; Bradenton, USA; Clay $50,000	(Australia) Ball (United States) Cook; 4–6, 6–3, 10–6	(United States) DeHeart (United States) Widom	(United States) Nick Monroe (Mexico) Santiago González	(Peru) Iván Miranda (United States) Lester Cook (Argentina) Mariano Puerta (United States) Stephen Bass
May 12	Morocco Tennis Tour – Marrakech; Marrakesh, Morocco; Clay €85,000+H	(France) Gaël Monfils; 7–6(2), 7–6(6)	(France) Jérémy Chardy	(Chile) Nicolás Massú (Spain) Rubén Ramírez Hidalgo	(Portugal) Frederico Gil (Argentina) Martín Vassallo Argüello (France) Jean-Christophe Faurel (Spain) Guillermo García-López
May 12	Morocco Tennis Tour – Marrakech; Marrakesh, Morocco; Clay €85,000+H	(Portugal) Gil (Romania) Mergea; 6–2, 6–3	(United Kingdom) Auckland (United Kingdom) Delgado	(Chile) Nicolás Massú (Spain) Rubén Ramírez Hidalgo	(Portugal) Frederico Gil (Argentina) Martín Vassallo Argüello (France) Jean-Christophe Faurel (Spain) Guillermo García-López
May 12	Sail Open; New Delhi, India; Hard $50,000	(Chinese Taipei) Yen-Hsun Lu; 5–7, 7–6(5), 6–3	(United States) Brendan Evans	(Japan) Go Soeda (Denmark) Kristian Pless	(Australia) Colin Ebelthite (Kuwait) Mohammed Ghareeb (United Kingdom) Alex Bogdanovic (Australia) Samuel Groth
May 12	Sail Open; New Delhi, India; Hard $50,000	(Australia) Ebelthite (Australia) Groth; 2–6, 7–6(5), 10–8	(Kuwait) Ghareeb (Ukraine) Marchenko	(Japan) Go Soeda (Denmark) Kristian Pless	(Australia) Colin Ebelthite (Kuwait) Mohammed Ghareeb (United Kingdom) Alex Bogdanovic (Australia) Samuel Groth
May 12	LCF Sanremo Tennis Cup; Sanremo, Italy; Clay €30,000+H	(Argentina) Diego Junqueira; 6–2, 6–4	(Argentina) Máximo González	(France) Nicolas Devilder (Spain) Pablo Andújar	(Spain) Santiago Ventura (Russia) Andrey Golubev (Germany) Matthias Bachinger (Germany) Daniel Brands
May 12	LCF Sanremo Tennis Cup; Sanremo, Italy; Clay €30,000+H	(Israel) Levy (United States) Thomas; 6–4, 6–4	(Germany) Bachinger (Germany) Brands	(France) Nicolas Devilder (Spain) Pablo Andújar	(Spain) Santiago Ventura (Russia) Andrey Golubev (Germany) Matthias Bachinger (Germany) Daniel Brands
May 12	Zagreb Open; Zagreb, Croatia; Clay $50,000+H	(Belgium) Christophe Rochus; 6–3, 6–4	(Argentina) Carlos Berlocq	(Spain) Pere Riba (Brazil) Franco Ferreiro	(Croatia) Antonio Veić (Croatia) Roko Karanušić (Czech Republic) Jiří Vaněk (Austria) Werner Eschauer
May 12	Zagreb Open; Zagreb, Croatia; Clay $50,000+H	(Bosnia and Herzegovina) Dodig (Brazil) Silva; 6–4, 7–6(1)	(Ukraine) Stakhovsky (Czech Republic) Zíb	(Spain) Pere Riba (Brazil) Franco Ferreiro	(Croatia) Antonio Veić (Croatia) Roko Karanušić (Czech Republic) Jiří Vaněk (Austria) Werner Eschauer
May 19	Fergana Challenger; Fergana, Uzbekistan; Hard $35,000+H	(Czech Republic) Pavel Šnobel; 7–5, 6–3	(Switzerland) George Bastl	(Russia) Konstantin Kravchuk (South Africa) Raven Klaasen	(Thailand) Danai Udomchoke (Turkey) Marsel İlhan (Chinese Taipei) Ti Chen (Poland) Łukasz Kubot
May 19	Fergana Challenger; Fergana, Uzbekistan; Hard $35,000+H	(Russia) Kravchuk (Poland) Kubot; 6–4, 6–1	(Russia) Krasnoroutskiy (Uzbekistan) Uzakov	(Russia) Konstantin Kravchuk (South Africa) Raven Klaasen	(Thailand) Danai Udomchoke (Turkey) Marsel İlhan (Chinese Taipei) Ti Chen (Poland) Łukasz Kubot
May 19	New Delhi 2 Challenger; New Delhi, India; Hard $50,000	(Japan) Go Soeda; 6–3, 3–6, 6–4	(Chinese Taipei) Yen-Hsun Lu	(Spain) Guillermo Alcaide (Russia) Alexander Kudryavtsev	(Pakistan) Aisam-ul-Haq Qureshi (France) Thomas Oger (Brazil) Ricardo Mello (Luxembourg) Gilles Müller
May 19	New Delhi 2 Challenger; New Delhi, India; Hard $50,000	(India) Mankad (India) Singh; 7–5, 6–3	(United States) Evans (India) Ghouse	(Spain) Guillermo Alcaide (Russia) Alexander Kudryavtsev	(Pakistan) Aisam-ul-Haq Qureshi (France) Thomas Oger (Brazil) Ricardo Mello (Luxembourg) Gilles Müller
May 26	Trofeo Cassa di Risparmio; Alessandria, Italy; Clay $35,000+H	(Italy) Paolo Lorenzi; 4–6, 7–6(5), 7–6(4)	(Italy) Simone Vagnozzi	(Romania) Adrian Ungur (Spain) Alberto Martín	(Ukraine) Oleksandr Dolgopolov, Jr. (Italy) Giancarlo Petrazzuolo (Italy) Alberto Brizzi (Italy) Gianluca Naso
May 26	Trofeo Cassa di Risparmio; Alessandria, Italy; Clay $35,000+H	(Italy) Cipolla (Italy) Vagnozzi; 3–6, 6–1, 10–4	(Netherlands) Middlekoop (Netherlands) Van Gemerden	(Romania) Adrian Ungur (Spain) Alberto Martín	(Ukraine) Oleksandr Dolgopolov, Jr. (Italy) Giancarlo Petrazzuolo (Italy) Alberto Brizzi (Italy) Gianluca Naso
May 26	Countrywide Classic USTA Challenger; Carson, California, USA; Hard $50,000	(United States) Amer Delic; 7–6(5), 6–4	(United States) Alex Bogomolov, Jr.	(Paraguay) Ramón Delgado (Brazil) Thiago Alves	(United States) Lester Cook (United States) Phillip King (United States) Nick Monroe (United States) Michael McClune
May 26	Countrywide Classic USTA Challenger; Carson, California, USA; Hard $50,000	(Australia) Ball (United States) Rettenmaier; 6–4, 6–2	(United States) DeHeart (New Zealand) King-Turner	(Paraguay) Ramón Delgado (Brazil) Thiago Alves	(United States) Lester Cook (United States) Phillip King (United States) Nick Monroe (United States) Michael McClune
May 26	Türk Telecom İzmir Cup; İzmir, Turkey; Hard €64,000	(Luxembourg) Gilles Müller; 7–5, 6–3	(Denmark) Kristian Pless	(Serbia) Vladimir Obradović (Ukraine) Illya Marchenko	(Spain) Fernando Vicente (Sweden) Björn Rehnquist (Argentina) Nicolás Todero (Russia) Alexander Kudryavtsev
May 26	Türk Telecom İzmir Cup; İzmir, Turkey; Hard €64,000	(United States) Levine (Japan) Nishikori; 6–1, 7–5	(United States) N Thompson (Thailand) Udomchoke	(Serbia) Vladimir Obradović (Ukraine) Illya Marchenko	(Spain) Fernando Vicente (Sweden) Björn Rehnquist (Argentina) Nicolás Todero (Russia) Alexander Kudryavtsev
May 26	Baden Open; Karlsruhe, Germany; Clay $35,000+H	(Russia) Teymuraz Gabashvili; 6–1, 6–4	(Germany) Tobias Kamke	(Germany) Björn Phau (Netherlands) Martin Verkerk	(Australia) Joseph Sirianni (Spain) Gabriel Trujillo-Soler (Spain) Daniel Muñoz-de la Nava (Brazil) Franco Ferreiro
May 26	Baden Open; Karlsruhe, Germany; Clay $35,000+H	(Austria) Köllerer (Germany) Moser; 6–2, 7–5	(South Korea) Jun (Australia) Sirianni	(Germany) Björn Phau (Netherlands) Martin Verkerk	(Australia) Joseph Sirianni (Spain) Gabriel Trujillo-Soler (Spain) Daniel Muñoz-de la Nava (Brazil) Franco Ferreiro

=== June ===
Week of	Tournament	Winner	Runner-up	Semi finalists	Quarter finalist
Jun 2 2008	Schickedanz Open; Fürth, Germany; Clay €42,500+H	(Austria) Daniel Köllerer; 6–1, 6–3	(Colombia) Santiago Giraldo	(Austria) Alexander Peya (France) Alexandre Sidorenko	(Poland) Dawid Olejniczak (United States) Jesse Levine (Germany) Simon Greul (Brazil) Marcos Daniel
Jun 2 2008	Schickedanz Open; Fürth, Germany; Clay €42,500+H	(Germany) Marx (Austria) Peya; 6–3, 6–3	(Austria) Köllerer (Germany) Moser	(Austria) Alexander Peya (France) Alexandre Sidorenko	(Poland) Dawid Olejniczak (United States) Jesse Levine (Germany) Simon Greul (Brazil) Marcos Daniel
Jun 2 2008	Unicredit Czech Open; Prostějov, Czech Republic; Clay €127,500+H	(Argentina) Agustín Calleri; 6–0, 6–3	(Argentina) Martín Vassallo Argüello	(Brazil) Thomaz Bellucci (Belgium) Christophe Rochus	(Czech Republic) Tomáš Berdych (Argentina) Sergio Roitman (Italy) Flavio Cipolla (Czech Republic) Bohdan Ulihrach
Jun 2 2008	Unicredit Czech Open; Prostějov, Czech Republic; Clay €127,500+H	(South Africa) de Voest (Poland) Kubot; 6–2, 6–2	(South Africa) Haggard (France) Tourte	(Brazil) Thomaz Bellucci (Belgium) Christophe Rochus	(Czech Republic) Tomáš Berdych (Argentina) Sergio Roitman (Italy) Flavio Cipolla (Czech Republic) Bohdan Ulihrach
Jun 2 2008	Memorial Argo Manfredini; Sassuolo, Italy; Clay €30,000+H	(Portugal) Frederico Gil; 6–2, 6–3	(Spain) Santiago Ventura	(Spain) David Marrero (Spain) Daniel Gimeno-Traver	(Argentina) Mariano Puerta (Serbia) Boris Pašanski (Argentina) Horacio Zeballos (Italy) Marco Crugnola
Jun 2 2008	Memorial Argo Manfredini; Sassuolo, Italy; Clay €30,000+H	(Argentina) Aranguren (Italy) Galvani; 5–7, 6–2, 10–8	(Spain) Ramírez Hidalgo (Spain) Sanchez-de Luna	(Spain) David Marrero (Spain) Daniel Gimeno-Traver	(Argentina) Mariano Puerta (Serbia) Boris Pašanski (Argentina) Horacio Zeballos (Italy) Marco Crugnola
Jun 2 2008	The Surbiton Trophy; Surbiton, Great Britain; Grass €42,500	(Canada) Frank Dancevic; 4–6, 6–3, 7–6(4)	(South Africa) Kevin Anderson	(France) Édouard Roger-Vasselin (France) Adrian Mannarino	(Australia) Robert Smeets (France) Arnaud Clément (Switzerland) Stéphane Bohli (Israel) Harel Levy
Jun 2 2008	The Surbiton Trophy; Surbiton, Great Britain; Grass €42,500	(France) Clément (France) Roger-Vasselin; 7–6(4), 6–7(3), 10–7	(Israel) Levy (United States) Thomas	(France) Édouard Roger-Vasselin (France) Adrian Mannarino	(Australia) Robert Smeets (France) Arnaud Clément (Switzerland) Stéphane Bohli (Israel) Harel Levy
Jun 2 2008	Sunset Moulding YCRC Challenger; Yuba City, USA; Hard $50,000	(United States) Michael Yani; 7–6(5), 2–6, 6–3	(United States) Sam Warburg	(Paraguay) Ramón Delgado (Australia) Carsten Ball	(United States) Lester Cook (Israel) Amir Weintraub (United States) Todd Paul (Dominican Republic) Víctor Estrella
Jun 2 2008	Sunset Moulding YCRC Challenger; Yuba City, USA; Hard $50,000	(United States) Monroe (United States) Yani; 6–4, 6–4	(United States) Gambill (United States) Oudsema	(Paraguay) Ramón Delgado (Australia) Carsten Ball	(United States) Lester Cook (Israel) Amir Weintraub (United States) Todd Paul (Dominican Republic) Víctor Estrella
Jun 9 2008	Košice Open – Steelers Cup; Košice, Slovakia; Clay €30,000+H	(Czech Republic) Lukáš Rosol; 7–5, 6–1	(Spain) Miguel Ángel López Jaén	(Czech Republic) Jaroslav Pospíšil (France) Nicolas Devilder	(Slovakia) Pavol Červenák (Spain) Guillermo Olaso (Slovakia) Dominik Hrbatý (Spain) Carles Poch-Gradin
Jun 9 2008	Košice Open – Steelers Cup; Košice, Slovakia; Clay €30,000+H	(Poland) Bednarek (Slovakia) Zelenay; 6–1, 4–6, 13–11	(Spain) López Jaén (Spain) Poch-Gradin	(Czech Republic) Jaroslav Pospíšil (France) Nicolas Devilder	(Slovakia) Pavol Červenák (Spain) Guillermo Olaso (Slovakia) Dominik Hrbatý (Spain) Carles Poch-Gradin
Jun 9 2008	Zenith Tennis Cup; Milan, Italy; Clay €30,000+H	(Russia) Teymuraz Gabashvili; 6–4, 4–6, 6–4	(Argentina) Diego Hartfield	(Spain) Pablo Andújar (Portugal) Frederico Gil	(Austria) Rainer Eitzinger (Brazil) Thiago Alves (Monaco) Jean-René Lisnard (Italy) Alberto Brizzi
Jun 9 2008	Zenith Tennis Cup; Milan, Italy; Clay €30,000+H	(Switzerland) Allegro (Romania) Tecău; 6–4, 6–4	(Argentina) Aranguren (Spain) Fornell-Mestres	(Spain) Pablo Andújar (Portugal) Frederico Gil	(Austria) Rainer Eitzinger (Brazil) Thiago Alves (Monaco) Jean-René Lisnard (Italy) Alberto Brizzi
Jun 9 2008	Bulgarian Open Challenger; Sofia, Bulgaria; Clay €42,500	(Romania) Adrian Ungur; 6–3, 6–0	(Brazil) Franco Ferreiro	(Romania) Adrian Cruciat (Italy) Enrico Burzi	(Germany) Julian Reister (Portugal) Rui Machado (France) Jonathan Dasnieres de Veigy (Spain) Javier Genaro-Martínez
Jun 9 2008	Bulgarian Open Challenger; Sofia, Bulgaria; Clay €42,500	(Brazil) Ferreiro (Argentina) Peurta; 6–3, 1–6, 10–3	(North Macedonia) Magdinčev (North Macedonia) Rusevski	(Romania) Adrian Cruciat (Italy) Enrico Burzi	(Germany) Julian Reister (Portugal) Rui Machado (France) Jonathan Dasnieres de Veigy (Spain) Javier Genaro-Martínez
Jun 16 2008	Nord LB Open; Braunschweig, Germany; Clay €106,500+H	(France) Nicolas Devilder; 6–4 6–4	(Argentina) Sergio Roitman	(Czech Republic) Jiří Vaněk (Spain) Pablo Andújar	(Argentina) Brian Dabul (Spain) Óscar Hernández (Brazil) André Ghem (Argentina) Carlos Berlocq
Jun 16 2008	Nord LB Open; Braunschweig, Germany; Clay €106,500+H	(Italy) Crugnola (Spain) Hernandez; 7–6(4), 6–2	(Austria) Eschauer (Austria) Oswald	(Czech Republic) Jiří Vaněk (Spain) Pablo Andújar	(Argentina) Brian Dabul (Spain) Óscar Hernández (Brazil) André Ghem (Argentina) Carlos Berlocq
Jun 16 2008	Polska Energia Open; Bytom, Poland; Clay €30,000+H	(France) Laurent Recouderc; 6–3, 6–4	(Spain) Pablo Santos	(Croatia) Antonio Veić (Australia) Rameez Junaid	(Czech Republic) Jan Hájek (Germany) Simon Greul (Spain) Pere Riba (France) Alexandre Sidorenko
Jun 16 2008	Polska Energia Open; Bytom, Poland; Clay €30,000+H	(Poland) Gawron (Poland) Kowalczyk; 6–4, 3–6, 10–7	(Australia) Durek (Poland) Koniusz	(Croatia) Antonio Veić (Australia) Rameez Junaid	(Czech Republic) Jan Hájek (Germany) Simon Greul (Spain) Pere Riba (France) Alexandre Sidorenko
Jun 16 2008	Guzzini Challenger; Recanati, Italy; Hard €30,000+H	(Argentina) Horacio Zeballos; 6–3, 6–4	(Slovenia) Grega Žemlja	(Croatia) Franko Škugor (Germany) Benedikt Dorsch	(Germany) Björn Phau (Slovenia) Marko Tkalec (Italy) Manuel Jorquera (Russia) Evgeny Kirillov
Jun 16 2008	Guzzini Challenger; Recanati, Italy; Hard €30,000+H	(Germany) Dorsch (Germany) Phau; 6–3, 7–5	(China) Yu (China) Zeng	(Croatia) Franko Škugor (Germany) Benedikt Dorsch	(Germany) Björn Phau (Slovenia) Marko Tkalec (Italy) Manuel Jorquera (Russia) Evgeny Kirillov
Jun 23 2008	Mamaia Challenger; Constanţa, Romania; Clay €30,000+H	(France) Nicolas Devilder; 6–3, 6–7(5), 7–6^{(12–10)}	(Romania) Adrian Ungur	(Romania) Adrian Cruciat (Spain) Iván Navarro	(Spain) Guillermo Alcaide (Romania) Victor Crivoi (Brazil) Júlio Silva (Spain) Marc López
Jun 23 2008	Mamaia Challenger; Constanţa, Romania; Clay €30,000+H	(Romania) Mergea (Romania) Tecău; 6–4, 6–2	(Brazil) Silva (Italy) Vagnozzi	(Romania) Adrian Cruciat (Spain) Iván Navarro	(Spain) Guillermo Alcaide (Romania) Victor Crivoi (Brazil) Júlio Silva (Spain) Marc López
Jun 23 2008	Lines Trophy; Reggio Emilia, Italy; Clay €42,500+H	(France) Mathieu Montcourt; 2–6, 6–2, 6–4	(Spain) Pablo Andújar	(Argentina) Leonardo Mayer (Brazil) Franco Ferreiro	(Spain) Daniel Gimeno-Traver (France) Olivier Patience (Argentina) Juan Pablo Brzezicki (Uzbekistan) Denis Istomin
Jun 23 2008	Lines Trophy; Reggio Emilia, Italy; Clay €42,500+H	(China) Yu (China) Zeng; 6–3, 6–4	(Argentina) Hood (Argentina) Mayer	(Argentina) Leonardo Mayer (Brazil) Franco Ferreiro	(Spain) Daniel Gimeno-Traver (France) Olivier Patience (Argentina) Juan Pablo Brzezicki (Uzbekistan) Denis Istomin
Jun 30 2008	Open Diputación; Córdoba, Spain; Hard €106,500+H	(Spain) Iván Navarro; 6–7(4), 6–3, 7–6(10)	(Belgium) Dick Norman	(Spain) Fernando Vicente (Portugal) Rui Machado	(Australia) Samuel Groth (Germany) Matthias Bachinger (Russia) Andrey Golubev (Italy) Francesco Piccari
Jun 30 2008	Open Diputación; Córdoba, Spain; Hard €106,500+H	(Sweden) Brunström (Netherlands Antilles) Rojer; 6–4, 6–3	(United States) Cerretani (Belgium) Norman	(Spain) Fernando Vicente (Portugal) Rui Machado	(Australia) Samuel Groth (Germany) Matthias Bachinger (Russia) Andrey Golubev (Italy) Francesco Piccari
Jun 30 2008	Shelbourne Irish Open; Dublin, Ireland; Carpet €64,000+H; Singles – Doubles	(Australia) Robert Smeets; 7–6(5), 6–2	(Denmark) Frederik Nielsen	(Czech Republic) Tomáš Cakl (United Kingdom) Jonathan Marray	(India) Prakash Amritraj (Slovakia) Ivo Klec (Sweden) Björn Rehnquist (Luxembourg) Gilles Müller
Jun 30 2008	Shelbourne Irish Open; Dublin, Ireland; Carpet €64,000+H; Singles – Doubles	(India) Amritraj (Pakistan) Qureshi; 6–3, 7–6(6)	(United Kingdom) Marray (Denmark) Nielsen	(Czech Republic) Tomáš Cakl (United Kingdom) Jonathan Marray	(India) Prakash Amritraj (Slovakia) Ivo Klec (Sweden) Björn Rehnquist (Luxembourg) Gilles Müller
Jun 30 2008	BSI Challenger Lugano; Lugano, Switzerland; Clay €85,000+H	(Peru) Luis Horna; 7–6(1), 6–1	(France) Nicolas Devilder	(France) Olivier Patience (Romania) Victor Crivoi	(Argentina) Guillermo Cañas (France) Éric Prodon (Spain) Pablo Andújar (Italy) Potito Starace
Jun 30 2008	BSI Challenger Lugano; Lugano, Switzerland; Clay €85,000+H	(Australia) Junaid (Germany) Marx; 7–6(7), 4–6, 10–7	(Argentina) Hood (Argentina) Schwank	(France) Olivier Patience (Romania) Victor Crivoi	(Argentina) Guillermo Cañas (France) Éric Prodon (Spain) Pablo Andújar (Italy) Potito Starace
Jun 30 2008	Sporting Challenger; Turin, Italy; Clay €85,000+H	(Italy) Fabio Fognini; 6–3, 6–1	(Argentina) Diego Junqueira	(Argentina) Máximo González (Portugal) Frederico Gil	(Germany) Tobias Kamke (Algeria) Lamine Ouahab (Spain) Alberto Martín (Italy) Alessio di Mauro
Jun 30 2008	Sporting Challenger; Turin, Italy; Clay €85,000+H	(Argentina) Berlocq (Portugal) Gil; 6–4, 6–3	(Czech Republic) Cibulec (Czech Republic) Levinský	(Argentina) Máximo González (Portugal) Frederico Gil	(Germany) Tobias Kamke (Algeria) Lamine Ouahab (Spain) Alberto Martín (Italy) Alessio di Mauro
Jun 30 2008	Nielsen USTA Pro Tennis Championship; Winnetka, USA; Hard $50,000	(United States) Rajeev Ram; 7–5, 6–4	(United States) Scoville Jenkins	(Germany) Benedikt Dorsch (United States) Robert Kendrick	(United States) Brendan Evans (United States) Amer Delic (Slovenia) Luka Gregorc (Japan) Go Soeda
Jun 30 2008	Nielsen USTA Pro Tennis Championship; Winnetka, USA; Hard $50,000	(United States) Widom (United States) Yani; 6–2, 6–2	(Chinese Taipei) Chen (New Zealand) Statham	(Germany) Benedikt Dorsch (United States) Robert Kendrick	(United States) Brendan Evans (United States) Amer Delic (Slovenia) Luka Gregorc (Japan) Go Soeda

=== July ===
Week of	Tournament	Winner	Runner-up	Semi finalists	Quarter finalist
Jul 7 2008	Seguros Bolivar Open; Bogotá, Colombia; Clay $125,000+H	(Argentina) Mariano Puerta; 7–6(2), 7–5	(Brazil) Ricardo Hocevar	(Brazil) André Miele (Brazil) Caio Zampieri	(Colombia) Alejandro Falla (Brazil) Ricardo Mello (Colombia) Carlos Salamanca (Argentina) Damián Patriarca
Jul 7 2008	Seguros Bolivar Open; Bogotá, Colombia; Clay $125,000+H	(Belgium) Malisse (Colombia) Salamanca; 6–1, 6–4	(Colombia) Cabal (Colombia) Quintero	(Brazil) André Miele (Brazil) Caio Zampieri	(Colombia) Alejandro Falla (Brazil) Ricardo Mello (Colombia) Carlos Salamanca (Argentina) Damián Patriarca
Jul 7 2008	Granby Challenger; Granby, Canada; Hard $50,000+H	(United Kingdom) Alex Bogdanovic; 7–6(14), 3–6, 7–6(6)	(Thailand) Danai Udomchoke	(United States) Todd Widom (Canada) Frédéric Niemeyer	(United States) Lester Cook (France) Gary Lugassy (Canada) Milan Pokrajac (United States) Michael Yani
Jul 7 2008	Granby Challenger; Granby, Canada; Hard $50,000+H	(Canada) Bester (Canada) Polansky; 2–6, 6–1, 10–5	(United States) A Francis (United States) Monroe	(United States) Todd Widom (Canada) Frédéric Niemeyer	(United States) Lester Cook (France) Gary Lugassy (Canada) Milan Pokrajac (United States) Michael Yani
Jul 7 2008	Israel Open; Ramat Hasharon, Israel; Hard $50,000	(Turkey) Marsel İlhan; 6–4, 6–4	(Slovakia) Ivo Klec	(Russia) Michail Elgin (Australia) Colin Ebelthite	(Israel) Harel Levy (Australia) Miles Armstrong (Israel) Amir Weintraub (United Kingdom) Alexander Slabinsky
Jul 7 2008	Israel Open; Ramat Hasharon, Israel; Hard $50,000	(Israel) Erlich (Israel) Ram; 6–3, 7–6(3)	(Russia) Elgin (Ukraine) Bubka	(Russia) Michail Elgin (Australia) Colin Ebelthite	(Israel) Harel Levy (Australia) Miles Armstrong (Israel) Amir Weintraub (United Kingdom) Alexander Slabinsky
Jul 7 2008	Carisap Tennis Cup; San Benedetto, Italy; Clay €30,000+H	(Argentina) Máximo González; 6–4, 7–6(5)	(Argentina) Diego Junqueira	(France) Alexandre Sidorenko (Italy) Stefano Galvani	(Spain) Pere Riba (Italy) Francesco Aldi (Italy) Alessio di Mauro (Spain) José Antonio Sánchez-de Luna
Jul 7 2008	Carisap Tennis Cup; San Benedetto, Italy; Clay €30,000+H	(Italy) Lorenzi (Brazil) Silva; 6–3, 7–5	(Romania) Gârd (Austria) Raditschnigg	(France) Alexandre Sidorenko (Italy) Stefano Galvani	(Spain) Pere Riba (Italy) Francesco Aldi (Italy) Alessio di Mauro (Spain) José Antonio Sánchez-de Luna
Jul 7 2008	Siemens Open; Scheveningen, The Netherlands; Clay €85,000+H	(Netherlands) Jesse Huta Galung; 6–3, 6–4	(Argentina) Diego Hartfield	(Netherlands) Thiemo de Bakker (France) Thierry Ascione	(Italy) Marco Crugnola (Georgia (country)) Irakli Labadze (Spain) Daniel Muñoz-de la Nava (Romania) Adrian Ungur
Jul 7 2008	Siemens Open; Scheveningen, The Netherlands; Clay €85,000+H	(Australia) Junaid (Germany) Marx; 5–7, 6–2, 10–6	(Netherlands) Middelkoop (Netherlands) Van Gemerden	(Netherlands) Thiemo de Bakker (France) Thierry Ascione	(Italy) Marco Crugnola (Georgia (country)) Irakli Labadze (Spain) Daniel Muñoz-de la Nava (Romania) Adrian Ungur
Jul 14 2008	Comerica Bank Challenger; Aptos, United States; Hard $75,000	(United States) Kevin Kim; 7–5, 6–1	(Italy) Andrea Stoppini	(United States) Scoville Jenkins (Australia) Carsten Ball	(India) Prakash Amritraj (United States) Todd Widom (United States) Michael Yani (Germany) Simon Stadler
Jul 14 2008	Comerica Bank Challenger; Aptos, United States; Hard $75,000	(Israel) Okun; Weintraub; 6–2, 6–1	(United States) Widom (United States) Yani	(United States) Scoville Jenkins (Australia) Carsten Ball	(India) Prakash Amritraj (United States) Todd Widom (United States) Michael Yani (Germany) Simon Stadler
Jul 14 2008	Manchester Trophy; Manchester, Great Britain; Grass €30,000+H	(Sweden) Björn Rehnquist; 7–6(8), 0–6, 6–3	(United Kingdom) Richard Bloomfield	(Slovakia) Karol Beck (Czech Republic) Pavel Šnobel	(Australia) Robert Smeets (United Kingdom) Joshua Goodall (Japan) Gouichi Motomura (Australia) Samuel Groth
Jul 14 2008	Manchester Trophy; Manchester, Great Britain; Grass €30,000+H	(Australia) Feeney; Smeets; 6–3, 6–7(5), 10–6	(India) Mankad (India) Singh	(Slovakia) Karol Beck (Czech Republic) Pavel Šnobel	(Australia) Robert Smeets (United Kingdom) Joshua Goodall (Japan) Gouichi Motomura (Australia) Samuel Groth
Jul 14 2008	Trofeo Manta Open; Manta, Ecuador; Hard $35,000+H	(Ecuador) Giovanni Lapentti; 6–2, 6–4	(Brazil) Ricardo Mello	(United States) Eric Nunez (Spain) Guillermo Alcaide	(Brazil) Thiago Alves (Brazil) Daniel Dutra da Silva (Brazil) João Souza (Spain) Fernando Vicente
Jul 14 2008	Trofeo Manta Open; Manta, Ecuador; Hard $35,000+H	(Colombia) González (Colombia) Struvay; 7–5, 3–6, 10–7	(Dominican Republic) Estrella (Argentina) Fabbri	(United States) Eric Nunez (Spain) Guillermo Alcaide	(Brazil) Thiago Alves (Brazil) Daniel Dutra da Silva (Brazil) João Souza (Spain) Fernando Vicente
Jul 14 2008	Moncton Men's Challenger; Moncton, Canada; Hard $35,000+H	(Belgium) Xavier Malisse; 6–4, 6–4	(Thailand) Danai Udomchoke	(Portugal) Gastão Elias (Canada) Érik Chvojka	(South Korea) Im Kyu-tae (United States) Nick Monroe (Japan) Toshihide Matsui (Japan) Tatsuma Ito
Jul 14 2008	Moncton Men's Challenger; Moncton, Canada; Hard $35,000+H	(South Korea) An (Japan) Kondo; 6–2, 2–6, 12–10	(Canada) D Chu (Canada) Shamasdin	(Portugal) Gastão Elias (Canada) Érik Chvojka	(South Korea) Im Kyu-tae (United States) Nick Monroe (Japan) Toshihide Matsui (Japan) Tatsuma Ito
Jul 14 2008	Oberstaufen Cup; Oberstaufen, Germany; Clay €30,000+H	(Poland) Łukasz Kubot; 6–3, 6–4	(Argentina) Juan Pablo Brzezicki	(Czech Republic) Jaroslav Pospíšil (Brazil) André Ghem	(Germany) Marcel Zimmermann (Germany) Marc Sieber (Romania) Victor Crivoi (France) Nicolas Coutelot
Jul 14 2008	Oberstaufen Cup; Oberstaufen, Germany; Clay €30,000+H	(Czech Republic) Karol (Czech Republic) Pospíšil; 6–7(2), 6–1, 10–6	(Brazil) Ghem (Netherlands) Westerhof	(Czech Republic) Jaroslav Pospíšil (Brazil) André Ghem	(Germany) Marcel Zimmermann (Germany) Marc Sieber (Romania) Victor Crivoi (France) Nicolas Coutelot
Jul 14 2008	Rimini Challenger; Rimini, Italy; Clay €42,500+H	(Argentina) Diego Junqueira; 6–4, 6–3	(Italy) Walter Trusendi	(Argentina) Cristian Villagrán (Italy) Alessio di Mauro	(Netherlands) Matwe Middelkoop (Serbia) Ilija Bozoljac (Italy) Stefano Galvani (Italy) Marco Crugnola
Jul 14 2008	Rimini Challenger; Rimini, Italy; Clay €42,500+H	(Italy) Azzaro (Italy) Crugnola; 6–1, 6–1	(Romania) Gârd (Netherlands) Middelkoop	(Argentina) Cristian Villagrán (Italy) Alessio di Mauro	(Netherlands) Matwe Middelkoop (Serbia) Ilija Bozoljac (Italy) Stefano Galvani (Italy) Marco Crugnola
Jul 21 2008	Fifth Third Bank Tennis Championships; Lexington, USA; Hard $50,000	(India) Somdev Devvarman; 6–3, 6–3	(United States) Robert Kendrick	(Israel) Dudi Sela (Belgium) Xavier Malisse	(United States) Amer Delic (United States) Ryler DeHeart (Dominican Republic) Víctor Estrella (Italy) Andrea Stoppini
Jul 21 2008	Fifth Third Bank Tennis Championships; Lexington, USA; Hard $50,000	(Italy) da Col (Italy) Stoppini; 6–2, 2–6, 10–8	(France) O Charroin (Canada) É Chvojka	(Israel) Dudi Sela (Belgium) Xavier Malisse	(United States) Amer Delic (United States) Ryler DeHeart (Dominican Republic) Víctor Estrella (Italy) Andrea Stoppini
Jul 21 2008	Medjugorje Open; Medjugorje, Bosnia and Herzegovina; Hard €30,000+H	(Spain) Iván Navarro; 6–0, 6–2	(Spain) Pere Riba	(Argentina) Juan Pablo Brzezicki (Austria) Martin Slanar	(Spain) Adrián Menéndez-Maceiras (Portugal) Rui Machado (Spain) Pablo Santos (France) Laurent Recouderc
Jul 21 2008	Medjugorje Open; Medjugorje, Bosnia and Herzegovina; Hard €30,000+H	(Czech Republic) Minář (Austria) Slanar; 7–5, 6–3	(Spain) Riba (Spain) Santos	(Argentina) Juan Pablo Brzezicki (Austria) Martin Slanar	(Spain) Adrián Menéndez-Maceiras (Portugal) Rui Machado (Spain) Pablo Santos (France) Laurent Recouderc
Jul 21 2008	Penza Cup; Penza, Russia; Hard $50,000	(Germany) Benedikt Dorsch; 1–6, 6–4, 7–6(6)	(Ukraine) Sergiy Stakhovsky	(Australia) Matthew Ebden (Kazakhstan) Mikhail Kukushkin	(Netherlands) Boy Westerhof (Russia) Evgeny Kirillov (Russia) Michail Elgin (Russia) Pavel Chekhov
Jul 21 2008	Penza Cup; Penza, Russia; Hard $50,000	(Uzbekistan) Istomin (Russia) Kirillov; 6–2, 3–6, 10–6	(Brazil) Ghem (Netherlands) Westerhof	(Australia) Matthew Ebden (Kazakhstan) Mikhail Kukushkin	(Netherlands) Boy Westerhof (Russia) Evgeny Kirillov (Russia) Michail Elgin (Russia) Pavel Chekhov
Jul 21 2008	Porsche Open; Poznań, Poland; Clay €85,000+H	(France) Nicolas Devilder; 7–5, 6–0	(Germany) Björn Phau	(Serbia) Boris Pašanski (Spain) Alberto Martín	(Poland) Grzegorz Panfil (Portugal) Frederico Gil (Kazakhstan) Yuri Schukin (Poland) Michał Przysiężny
Jul 21 2008	Porsche Open; Poznań, Poland; Clay €85,000+H	(Sweden) Brunström (Netherlands Antilles) Rojer; 4–6, 6–0, 10–6	(Colombia) Giraldo (Spain) Martín	(Serbia) Boris Pašanski (Spain) Alberto Martín	(Poland) Grzegorz Panfil (Portugal) Frederico Gil (Kazakhstan) Yuri Schukin (Poland) Michał Przysiężny
Jul 21 2008	San Marino CEPU Open; San Marino; Clay €85,000+H	(Italy) Filippo Volandri; 5–7, 6–4, 6–1	(Italy) Potito Starace	(Italy) Flavio Cipolla (Serbia) Viktor Troicki	(Argentina) Carlos Berlocq (Serbia) Ilija Bozoljac (Russia) Teymuraz Gabashvili (Spain) Albert Montañés
Jul 21 2008	San Marino CEPU Open; San Marino; Clay €85,000+H	(Switzerland) Allegro (Romania) Tecău; 7–5, 7–5	(Italy) Colangelo (Germany) Marx	(Italy) Flavio Cipolla (Serbia) Viktor Troicki	(Argentina) Carlos Berlocq (Serbia) Ilija Bozoljac (Russia) Teymuraz Gabashvili (Spain) Albert Montañés
Jul 28 2008	BH Tenis Open International Cup; Belo Horizonte, Brazil; Hard $35,000+H	(Mexico) Santiago González; 6–4, 6–3	(Chile) Nicolás Massú	(Argentina) Leonardo Mayer (Brazil) Caio Zampieri	(Colombia) Carlos Salamanca (Pakistan) Aisam-ul-Haq Qureshi (Brazil) André Miele (Colombia) Juan Sebastián Cabal
Jul 28 2008	BH Tenis Open International Cup; Belo Horizonte, Brazil; Hard $35,000+H	(Mexico) González (Pakistan) Qureshi; 6–3, 7–6(3)	(Brazil) Silva (Brazil) Zampieri	(Argentina) Leonardo Mayer (Brazil) Caio Zampieri	(Colombia) Carlos Salamanca (Pakistan) Aisam-ul-Haq Qureshi (Brazil) André Miele (Colombia) Juan Sebastián Cabal
Jul 28 2008	Zucchetti Kos Tennis Cup; Cordenons, Italy; Clay €85,000+H	(Italy) Filippo Volandri; 6–3, 7–5	(Spain) Óscar Hernández	(Brazil) Thiago Alves (Spain) Daniel Gimeno-Traver	(Colombia) Santiago Giraldo (Russia) Teymuraz Gabashvili (Argentina) Martín Vassallo Argüello (Spain) Pere Riba
Jul 28 2008	Zucchetti Kos Tennis Cup; Cordenons, Italy; Clay €85,000+H	(Italy) Crugnola (Italy) di Mauro; 1–6, 6–4, 10–6	(Argentina) García (Argentina) Prieto	(Brazil) Thiago Alves (Spain) Daniel Gimeno-Traver	(Colombia) Santiago Giraldo (Russia) Teymuraz Gabashvili (Argentina) Martín Vassallo Argüello (Spain) Pere Riba
Jul 28 2008	s Tennis Masters Challenger; Graz, Austria; Clay €30,000+H	(France) Jérémy Chardy; 6–2, 6–1	(Argentina) Sergio Roitman	(Germany) Simon Greul (Czech Republic) Jiří Vaněk	(Portugal) Rui Machado (Spain) Pablo Andújar (France) Sébastien de Chaunac (Belgium) Christophe Rochus
Jul 28 2008	s Tennis Masters Challenger; Graz, Austria; Clay €30,000+H	(Austria) G. Melzer (Austria) J. Melzer; 1–6, 7–6(8), 10–4	(France) Jeanpierre (France) Renavand	(Germany) Simon Greul (Czech Republic) Jiří Vaněk	(Portugal) Rui Machado (Spain) Pablo Andújar (France) Sébastien de Chaunac (Belgium) Christophe Rochus
Jul 28 2008	Mordovia Cup; Saransk, Russia; Clay $50,000	(Russia) Michail Elgin; 7–6(6), 3–6, 6–3	(Uzbekistan) Denis Istomin	(Brazil) André Ghem (Russia) Artur Chernov	(Kazakhstan) Mikhail Kukushkin (Russia) Andrey Kuznetsov (Russia) Pavel Chekhov (Australia) Miles Armstrong
Jul 28 2008	Mordovia Cup; Saransk, Russia; Clay $50,000	(Uzbekistan) Istomin (Russia) Kirillov; 6–2, 7–6(9)	(Russia) Krasnoroutskiy (Russia) Matsukevich	(Brazil) André Ghem (Russia) Artur Chernov	(Kazakhstan) Mikhail Kukushkin (Russia) Andrey Kuznetsov (Russia) Pavel Chekhov (Australia) Miles Armstrong
Jul 28 2008	Tampere Open; Tampere, Finland; Clay €42,500	(France) Mathieu Montcourt; 6–2, 6–2	(Italy) Flavio Cipolla	(France) Laurent Recouderc (Serbia) Boris Pašanski	(Czech Republic) Jan Hernych (Poland) Łukasz Kubot (France) Éric Prodon (Argentina) Carlos Berlocq
Jul 28 2008	Tampere Open; Tampere, Finland; Clay €42,500	(Sweden) Eleskovic (Sweden) Ryderstedt; 6–3, 6–4	(Finland) Heliövaara (Finland) Kontinen	(France) Laurent Recouderc (Serbia) Boris Pašanski	(Czech Republic) Jan Hernych (Poland) Łukasz Kubot (France) Éric Prodon (Argentina) Carlos Berlocq
Jul 28 2008	Timișoara Challenger; Timișoara, Romania; Clay €30,000+H	(Germany) Daniel Brands; 6–4, 7–6	(Spain) Daniel Muñoz-de la Nava	(Romania) Victor Crivoi (Romania) Florin Mergea	(Argentina) Nicolás Todero (Argentina) Juan Pablo Brzezicki (Spain) Guillermo Alcaide (Tunisia) Malek Jaziri
Jul 28 2008	Timișoara Challenger; Timișoara, Romania; Clay €30,000+H	(Spain) Muñoz-de la Nava (Spain) Ramírez Hidalgo; 3–6, 6–4, 11–9	(Romania) Cruciat (Romania) Mergea	(Romania) Victor Crivoi (Romania) Florin Mergea	(Argentina) Nicolás Todero (Argentina) Juan Pablo Brzezicki (Spain) Guillermo Alcaide (Tunisia) Malek Jaziri
Jul 28 2008	Odlum Brown Vancouver Open; Vancouver, Canada; Hard $100,000	(Israel) Dudi Sela; 6–3, 6–0	(United States) Kevin Kim	(Japan) Go Soeda (United States) Bobby Reynolds	(India) Somdev Devvarman (United Kingdom) Alex Bogdanovic (Canada) Peter Polansky (United States) Alex Bogomolov, Jr.
Jul 28 2008	Odlum Brown Vancouver Open; Vancouver, Canada; Hard $100,000	(United States) Butorac (United States) Parrott; 6–4, 7–6(3)	(South Africa) de Voest (Australia) Fisher	(Japan) Go Soeda (United States) Bobby Reynolds	(India) Somdev Devvarman (United Kingdom) Alex Bogdanovic (Canada) Peter Polansky (United States) Alex Bogomolov, Jr.

=== August ===
Week of	Tournament	Winner	Runner-up	Semi finalists	Quarter finalist
Aug 4 2008	Levene Gouldin & Thompson Tennis Challenger; Binghamton, USA; Hard $50,000	(Chile) Paul Capdeville; 4–6, 6–3, 6–1	(United States) Rajeev Ram	(United States) Travis Helgeson (Australia) Carsten Ball	(United States) Jesse Witten (Slovakia) Lukáš Lacko (Italy) Luigi D'Agord (United States) Brendan Evans
Aug 4 2008	Levene Gouldin & Thompson Tennis Challenger; Binghamton, USA; Hard $50,000	(Australia) Ball (United States) Rettenmaier; 6–3, 6–4	(United States) Battistone (United States) Battistone	(United States) Travis Helgeson (Australia) Carsten Ball	(United States) Jesse Witten (Slovakia) Lukáš Lacko (Italy) Luigi D'Agord (United States) Brendan Evans
Aug 4 2008	Credicard Citi Mastercard Tennis Cup; Campos do Jordão, Brazil; Hard $50,000+H	(Argentina) Brian Dabul; 7–5, 6–7(6), 6–3	(South Africa) Izak van der Merwe	(Argentina) Leonardo Mayer (Pakistan) Aisam-ul-Haq Qureshi	(Australia) Adam Feeney (Moldova) Roman Borvanov (Brazil) Ricardo Hocevar (Brazil) Daniel Silva
Aug 4 2008	Credicard Citi Mastercard Tennis Cup; Campos do Jordão, Brazil; Hard $50,000+H	(Argentina) Dabul (Uruguay) Felder; 6–4, 7–6(9)	(Brazil) Torres (South Africa) van der Merwe	(Argentina) Leonardo Mayer (Pakistan) Aisam-ul-Haq Qureshi	(Australia) Adam Feeney (Moldova) Roman Borvanov (Brazil) Ricardo Hocevar (Brazil) Daniel Silva
Aug 4 2008	New Delhi Challenger III; New Delhi, India; Hard $50,000	(Republic of Ireland) Conor Niland; 6–4, 6–4	(Czech Republic) Tomáš Cakl	(Australia) Brydan Klein (United Kingdom) Joshua Goodall	(Thailand) Danai Udomchoke (Japan) Toshihide Matsui (France) Pierrick Ysern (Japan) Gouichi Motomura
Aug 4 2008	New Delhi Challenger III; New Delhi, India; Hard $50,000	(United Kingdom) Goodall (United Kingdom) Ward; 6–4, 6–1	(Japan) Iwami (Japan) Kondo	(Australia) Brydan Klein (United Kingdom) Joshua Goodall	(Thailand) Danai Udomchoke (Japan) Toshihide Matsui (France) Pierrick Ysern (Japan) Gouichi Motomura
Aug 4 2008	Samarkand Challenger; Samarkand, Uzbekistan; Clay $35,000+H	(Russia) Michail Elgin; 7–6(4), 6–3	(Brazil) André Ghem	(Slovakia) Marek Semjan (Uzbekistan) Denis Istomin	(Serbia) Vladimir Obradović (Slovakia) Jan Stancik (Turkey) Marsel İlhan (Russia) Denis Matsukevich
Aug 4 2008	Samarkand Challenger; Samarkand, Uzbekistan; Clay $35,000+H	(Georgia (country)) Labadze (Russia) Matsukevich; 7–6(1), 4–6, 10–3	(Russia) D Arsenov (Uzbekistan) Uzakov	(Slovakia) Marek Semjan (Uzbekistan) Denis Istomin	(Serbia) Vladimir Obradović (Slovakia) Jan Stancik (Turkey) Marsel İlhan (Russia) Denis Matsukevich
Aug 4 2008	Open Castilla y León; Segovia, Spain; Hard $125,000+H	(Ukraine) Sergiy Stakhovsky; 7–5, 7–6(4)	(Brazil) Thiago Alves	(Germany) Michael Berrer (Spain) Iván Navarro	(Germany) Philipp Petzschner (Spain) Guillermo García-López (France) Jérémy Chardy (Netherlands) Jesse Huta Galung
Aug 4 2008	Open Castilla y León; Segovia, Spain; Hard $125,000+H	(United Kingdom) Hutchins (United States) Thomas; 7–6(3), 3–6, 10–8	(Czech Republic) Levinský (Slovakia) Polášek	(Germany) Michael Berrer (Spain) Iván Navarro	(Germany) Philipp Petzschner (Spain) Guillermo García-López (France) Jérémy Chardy (Netherlands) Jesse Huta Galung
Aug 11 2008	GHI Bronx Tennis Classic; Bronx, USA; Hard $50,000	(Czech Republic) Lukáš Dlouhý; 6–0, 6–1	(Argentina) Leonardo Mayer	(Czech Republic) Lukáš Rosol (Serbia) Ilija Bozoljac	(United Kingdom) Alex Bogdanovic (Germany) Simon Stadler (United States) Ryler DeHeart (Italy) Paolo Lorenzi
Aug 11 2008	GHI Bronx Tennis Classic; Bronx, USA; Hard $50,000	(Czech Republic) Dlouhý (Czech Republic) Zíb; 3–6, 6–4, 11–9	(Germany) Beck (Austria) Fischer	(Czech Republic) Lukáš Rosol (Serbia) Ilija Bozoljac	(United Kingdom) Alex Bogdanovic (Germany) Simon Stadler (United States) Ryler DeHeart (Italy) Paolo Lorenzi
Aug 11 2008	Bukhara Challenger; Bukhara, Uzbekistan; Hard $35,000+H	(Uzbekistan) Denis Istomin; 4–6, 6–1, 6–4	(Ukraine) Illya Marchenko	(Slovenia) Blaž Kavčič (Brazil) André Ghem	(France) Jérémy Blandin (Russia) Konstantin Kravchuk (Czech Republic) Pavel Šnobel (Austria) Oliver Marach
Aug 11 2008	Bukhara Challenger; Bukhara, Uzbekistan; Hard $35,000+H	(Russia) Chekhov (Russia) Elgin; 7–6(2), 6–1	(Poland) Kubot (Austria) Marach	(Slovenia) Blaž Kavčič (Brazil) André Ghem	(France) Jérémy Blandin (Russia) Konstantin Kravchuk (Czech Republic) Pavel Šnobel (Austria) Oliver Marach
Aug 11 2008	American Express – TED Open; Istanbul, Turkey; Hard $100,000+H	(Portugal) Frederico Gil; 6–4, 1–6, 6–3	(Germany) Benedikt Dorsch	(Ukraine) Sergiy Stakhovsky (Germany) Björn Phau	(Italy) Giancarlo Petrazzuolo (Luxembourg) Gilles Müller (Netherlands) Michel Koning (Spain) Fernando Vicente
Aug 11 2008	American Express – TED Open; Istanbul, Turkey; Hard $100,000+H	(Germany) Kohlmann (Germany) Moser; 7–6(4), 6–4	(Czech Republic) Škoch (Slovakia) Zelenay	(Ukraine) Sergiy Stakhovsky (Germany) Björn Phau	(Italy) Giancarlo Petrazzuolo (Luxembourg) Gilles Müller (Netherlands) Michel Koning (Spain) Fernando Vicente
Aug 11 2008	New Delhi Challenger IV; New Delhi, India; Hard $50,000	(Germany) Dieter Kindlmann; 7–6(3), 6–3	(United Kingdom) Joshua Goodall	(Thailand) Danai Udomchoke (Chinese Taipei) Tsung-Hua Yang	(South Korea) Jae-Sung An (Australia) Miles Armstrong (Australia) Brydan Klein (United Kingdom) Alexander Slabinsky
Aug 11 2008	New Delhi Challenger IV; New Delhi, India; Hard $50,000	(India) Mankad (India) Singh; 4–6, 6–4, 11–9	(India) Gajjar (India) Raja	(Thailand) Danai Udomchoke (Chinese Taipei) Tsung-Hua Yang	(South Korea) Jae-Sung An (Australia) Miles Armstrong (Australia) Brydan Klein (United Kingdom) Alexander Slabinsky
Aug 11 2008	Cidade De Vigo; Vigo, Spain; Clay $35,000+H	(Spain) Pablo Andújar; 6–1, 3–6, 6–3	(Italy) Marco Crugnola	(Spain) Rubén Ramírez Hidalgo (Spain) Adrián Menéndez-Maceiras	(Algeria) Lamine Ouahab (Spain) Santiago Ventura (Argentina) Diego Junqueira (Spain) Daniel Muñoz-de la Nava
Aug 11 2008	Cidade De Vigo; Vigo, Spain; Clay $35,000+H	(Italy) Crugnola (Italy) Motti; 6–3, 4–6, 10–4	(Spain) Clar-Rossello (Spain) Martin-Adalia	(Spain) Rubén Ramírez Hidalgo (Spain) Adrián Menéndez-Maceiras	(Algeria) Lamine Ouahab (Spain) Santiago Ventura (Argentina) Diego Junqueira (Spain) Daniel Muñoz-de la Nava
Aug 18 2008	IPP Trophy; Geneva, Switzerland; Clay $35,000+H	(Belgium) Kristof Vliegen; 6–2, 6–1	(Kazakhstan) Yuri Schukin	(Germany) Dominik Meffert (France) Olivier Patience	(Italy) Giancarlo Petrazzuolo (Brazil) André Ghem (Argentina) Sebastián Decoud (Argentina) Mariano Puerta
Aug 18 2008	IPP Trophy; Geneva, Switzerland; Clay $35,000+H	(Austria) Köllerer (Germany) Moser; 7–6(5), 3–6, 10–8	(Australia) Junaid (Germany) Marx	(Germany) Dominik Meffert (France) Olivier Patience	(Italy) Giancarlo Petrazzuolo (Brazil) André Ghem (Argentina) Sebastián Decoud (Argentina) Mariano Puerta
Aug 18 2008	Karshi Challenger; Karshi, Uzbekistan; Hard $35,000+H	(Uzbekistan) Denis Istomin; 6–3, 7–6(4)	(Russia) Michail Elgin	(Slovenia) Blaž Kavčič (Ukraine) Sergei Bubka	(Austria) Philipp Oswald (Czech Republic) Pavel Šnobel (Brazil) Rogério Dutra da Silva (Serbia) Vladimir Obradović
Aug 18 2008	Karshi Challenger; Karshi, Uzbekistan; Hard $35,000+H	(Poland) Kubot (Austria) Marach; 6–4, 6–4	(Austria) Haider-Maurer (Austria) Oswald	(Slovenia) Blaž Kavčič (Ukraine) Sergei Bubka	(Austria) Philipp Oswald (Czech Republic) Pavel Šnobel (Brazil) Rogério Dutra da Silva (Serbia) Vladimir Obradović
Aug 18 2008	A Savoldi-Marco Co. Trofeo Dimmidisi; Manerbio, Italy; Clay $75,000+H	(Romania) Victor Crivoi; 7–6(10), 6–2	(Belgium) Christophe Rochus	(Italy) Alessio di Mauro (Italy) Filippo Volandri	(Netherlands) Thiemo de Bakker (France) Mathieu Montcourt (Spain) Pere Riba (Kazakhstan) Mikhail Kukushkin
Aug 18 2008	A Savoldi-Marco Co. Trofeo Dimmidisi; Manerbio, Italy; Clay $75,000+H	(Italy) Fabbiano (Serbia) Pašanski; 7–6(7), 7–5	(Italy) Dell'Acqua (Italy) di Mauro	(Italy) Alessio di Mauro (Italy) Filippo Volandri	(Netherlands) Thiemo de Bakker (France) Mathieu Montcourt (Spain) Pere Riba (Kazakhstan) Mikhail Kukushkin
Aug 18 2008	Concurso Internacional de Tenis – San Sebastián; San Sebastian, Spain; Clay $35,000+H	(Spain) Pablo Andújar; 6–4, 6–1	(Spain) Rubén Ramírez Hidalgo	(Spain) Daniel Gimeno-Traver (Spain) Santiago Ventura	(Spain) Pablo Santos (Netherlands) Boy Westerhof (France) Augustin Gensse (Spain) Sergio Gutiérrez Ferrol
Aug 18 2008	Concurso Internacional de Tenis – San Sebastián; San Sebastian, Spain; Clay $35,000+H	(Spain) López (Spain) Trujillo-Soler; 6–7(3), 6–3, 10–6	(Spain) Ramírez Hidalgo (Spain) Sanchez-de Luna	(Spain) Daniel Gimeno-Traver (Spain) Santiago Ventura	(Spain) Pablo Santos (Netherlands) Boy Westerhof (France) Augustin Gensse (Spain) Sergio Gutiérrez Ferrol
Aug 25 2008	Southern Capital Cup; Almaty, Kazakhstan; Clay $35,000+H	(Argentina) Sebastián Decoud; 6–4, 6–2	(United States) Alex Bogomolov, Jr.	(Germany) Alexander Flock (Brazil) Rogério Dutra da Silva	(Kazakhstan) Alexey Kedryuk (Argentina) Mariano Puerta (Kazakhstan) Mikhail Kukushkin (Argentina) Diego Álvarez
Aug 25 2008	Southern Capital Cup; Almaty, Kazakhstan; Clay $35,000+H	(Russia) Krasnoroutskiy (Ukraine) Molchanov; 3–6, 6–3, 10–2	(Kazakhstan) Abdukhalikov (United States) Bogomolov, Jr.	(Germany) Alexander Flock (Brazil) Rogério Dutra da Silva	(Kazakhstan) Alexey Kedryuk (Argentina) Mariano Puerta (Kazakhstan) Mikhail Kukushkin (Argentina) Diego Álvarez
Aug 25 2008	Città di Como Challenger; Como, Italy; Clay €42,500+H	(Argentina) Diego Junqueira; 2–0 retired	(Austria) Daniel Köllerer	(Argentina) Juan Pablo Brzezicki (Chile) Nicolás Massú	(Romania) Victor Crivoi (Italy) Alberto Brizzi (Monaco) Jean-René Lisnard (Italy) Alessio di Mauro
Aug 25 2008	Città di Como Challenger; Como, Italy; Clay €42,500+H	(Argentina) Hood (Spain) Martín; 6–1, 6–4	(Chile) Hormazábal (Croatia) Veić	(Argentina) Juan Pablo Brzezicki (Chile) Nicolás Massú	(Romania) Victor Crivoi (Italy) Alberto Brizzi (Monaco) Jean-René Lisnard (Italy) Alessio di Mauro
Aug 25 2008	Black Forest Open; Freudenstadt, Germany; Clay €30,000+H	(Germany) Simon Greul; 6–3, 6–4	(Germany) Matthias Bachinger	(Kazakhstan) Yuri Schukin (Belgium) Kristof Vliegen	(Brazil) Flávio Saretta (Czech Republic) Bohdan Ulihrach (Spain) Marc López (Germany) Daniel Brands
Aug 25 2008	Black Forest Open; Freudenstadt, Germany; Clay €30,000+H	(Belgium) Norman (Belgium) Vliegen; 6–3, 6–3	(Austria) Eitzinger (Austria) Sandbichler	(Kazakhstan) Yuri Schukin (Belgium) Kristof Vliegen	(Brazil) Flávio Saretta (Czech Republic) Bohdan Ulihrach (Spain) Marc López (Germany) Daniel Brands

=== September ===
Week of	Tournament	Winner	Runner-up	Semi finalists	Quarter finalist
Sep 1 2008	TEAN International; Alphen, Netherlands; Clay $50,000	(Germany) Simon Greul; 6–4, 6–3	(Spain) Iván Navarro	(Netherlands) Jesse Huta Galung (Kazakhstan) Andrey Golubev	(Netherlands) Michel Koning (Netherlands) Thiemo de Bakker (Netherlands) Peter Wessels (Spain) Pere Riba
Sep 1 2008	TEAN International; Alphen, Netherlands; Clay $50,000	(Australia) Junaid (Germany) Marx; 6–3, 6–2	(Netherlands) Beks (Netherlands) Middelkoop	(Netherlands) Jesse Huta Galung (Kazakhstan) Andrey Golubev	(Netherlands) Michel Koning (Netherlands) Thiemo de Bakker (Netherlands) Peter Wessels (Spain) Pere Riba
Sep 1 2008	Brașov Challenger; Brașov, Romania; Clay $35,000+H	(Spain) Daniel Gimeno-Traver; 4–6, 6–4, 6–4	(Germany) Alexander Flock	(Spain) Pablo Santos (Romania) Adrian Cruciat	(Spain) Daniel Muñoz-de la Nava (Italy) Luca Vanni (Romania) Teodor-Dacian Crăciun (Brazil) Daniel Silva
Sep 1 2008	Brașov Challenger; Brașov, Romania; Clay $35,000+H	(Spain) Marrero (Spain) Muñoz-de la Nava; 6–4, 6–3	(Spain) Poch-Gradin (Spain) Santos	(Spain) Pablo Santos (Romania) Adrian Cruciat	(Spain) Daniel Muñoz-de la Nava (Italy) Luca Vanni (Romania) Teodor-Dacian Crăciun (Brazil) Daniel Silva
Sep 1 2008	UTC Open by Selena; Cherkassy, Ukraine; Clay $50,000+H	(France) Olivier Patience; 6–2, 6–0	(Uzbekistan) Denis Istomin	(Ukraine) Sergei Bubka (Ukraine) Sergiy Stakhovsky	(Ukraine) Illya Marchenko (France) Jonathan Dasnieres de Veigy (Georgia (country)) Irakli Labadze (Germany) Daniel Brands
Sep 1 2008	UTC Open by Selena; Cherkassy, Ukraine; Clay $50,000+H	(Russia) Elgin (Russia) Krasnoroutskiy; 6–4, 7–5	(Ukraine) Bubka (Ukraine) Stakhovsky	(Ukraine) Sergei Bubka (Ukraine) Sergiy Stakhovsky	(Ukraine) Illya Marchenko (France) Jonathan Dasnieres de Veigy (Georgia (country)) Irakli Labadze (Germany) Daniel Brands
Sep 1 2008	Düsseldorf Open; Düsseldorf, Germany; Clay $35,000+H	(Belgium) Kristof Vliegen; 6–0, 6–3	(Germany) Andreas Beck	(Kazakhstan) Evgeny Korolev (Germany) Dominik Meffert	(Kazakhstan) Yuri Schukin (Germany) Tobias Clemens (Czech Republic) Lukáš Rosol (Spain) Santiago Ventura
Sep 1 2008	Düsseldorf Open; Düsseldorf, Germany; Clay $35,000+H	(Czech Republic) Hájek (Czech Republic) Zíb; 1–6, 6–2, 10–7	(Czech Republic) Rosol (Slovakia) Zelenay	(Kazakhstan) Evgeny Korolev (Germany) Dominik Meffert	(Kazakhstan) Yuri Schukin (Germany) Tobias Clemens (Czech Republic) Lukáš Rosol (Spain) Santiago Ventura
Sep 1 2008	Genoa Open Challenger; Genoa, Italy; Clay $35,000+H	(Italy) Fabio Fognini; 6–4, 6–3	(Italy) Gianluca Naso	(Chile) Nicolás Massú (Italy) Alberto Brizzi	(Italy) Andrea Arnaboldi (Greece) Konstantinos Economidis (Portugal) Frederico Gil (Argentina) Cristian Villagrán
Sep 1 2008	Genoa Open Challenger; Genoa, Italy; Clay $35,000+H	(Italy) Naso (Italy) Trusendi; 6–2, 7–6(2)	(Italy) Galvani (San Marino) Vicini	(Chile) Nicolás Massú (Italy) Alberto Brizzi	(Italy) Andrea Arnaboldi (Greece) Konstantinos Economidis (Portugal) Frederico Gil (Argentina) Cristian Villagrán
Sep 8 2008	Alexander Kolyaskin Memorial; Donetsk, Ukraine; Hard $50,000+H	(Russia) Igor Kunitsyn; 6–3, 6–3	(Ukraine) Sergei Bubka	(Israel) Harel Levy (Ukraine) Illya Marchenko	(Republic of Ireland) Louk Sorensen (United States) Alex Bogomolov, Jr. (Germany) Daniel Brands (Russia) Konstantin Kravchuk
Sep 8 2008	Alexander Kolyaskin Memorial; Donetsk, Ukraine; Hard $50,000+H	(Belgium) Malisse (Belgium) Norman; 4–6, 6–1, 13–11	(Israel) Levy (Israel) Okun	(Israel) Harel Levy (Ukraine) Illya Marchenko	(Republic of Ireland) Louk Sorensen (United States) Alex Bogomolov, Jr. (Germany) Daniel Brands (Russia) Konstantin Kravchuk
Sep 8 2008	BMW Ljubljana Open; Ljubljana, Slovenia; Clay €42,500	(Serbia) Ilija Bozoljac; 6–4, 6–3	(Italy) Giancarlo Petrazzuolo	(Netherlands) Robin Haase (Croatia) Roko Karanušić	(Slovenia) Grega Žemlja (Republic of Ireland) James McGee (Argentina) Sergio Roitman (Republic of Ireland) Conor Niland
Sep 8 2008	BMW Ljubljana Open; Ljubljana, Slovenia; Clay €42,500	(Argentina) Brzezicki (Argentina) Hood; 7–5, 7–6(4)	(Australia) Junaid (Germany) Marx	(Netherlands) Robin Haase (Croatia) Roko Karanušić	(Slovenia) Grega Žemlja (Republic of Ireland) James McGee (Argentina) Sergio Roitman (Republic of Ireland) Conor Niland
Sep 8 2008	Open d'Orléans; Orléans, France; Hard (indoor) €106,500+H	(France) Nicolas Mahut; 5–7, 6–1, 7–6(2)	(Belgium) Christophe Rochus	(Germany) Michael Berrer (Cyprus) Marcos Baghdatis	(Netherlands) Matwe Middelkoop (France) Josselin Ouanna (United Kingdom) Alex Bogdanovic (France) Alexandre Sidorenko
Sep 8 2008	Open d'Orléans; Orléans, France; Hard (indoor) €106,500+H	(Ukraine) Stakhovsky (Croatia) Zovko; 7–6(7), 6–4	(Switzerland) Scherrer (Slovakia) Zelenay	(Germany) Michael Berrer (Cyprus) Marcos Baghdatis	(Netherlands) Matwe Middelkoop (France) Josselin Ouanna (United Kingdom) Alex Bogdanovic (France) Alexandre Sidorenko
Sep 8 2008	Challenger ATP Club Premium Open; Quito, Ecuador; Clay $35,000+H	(Ecuador) Giovanni Lapentti; 6–4, 6–4	(Italy) Riccardo Ghedin	(United States) Eric Nunez (Argentina) Diego Álvarez	(Italy) Luigi D'Agord (Colombia) Juan Sebastián Cabal (Dominican Republic) Víctor Estrella (Ecuador) Júlio César Campozano
Sep 8 2008	Challenger ATP Club Premium Open; Quito, Ecuador; Clay $35,000+H	(United States) Armando (Argentina) Mayer; 7–5, 6–2	(Brazil) Mello (Brazil) Zampieri	(United States) Eric Nunez (Argentina) Diego Álvarez	(Italy) Luigi D'Agord (Colombia) Juan Sebastián Cabal (Dominican Republic) Víctor Estrella (Ecuador) Júlio César Campozano
Sep 8 2008	Copa Sevilla; Seville, Spain; Clay €42,500+H	(Spain) Pere Riba; 6–1, 6–3	(Italy) Enrico Burzi	(Spain) Marc Fornell-Mestres (Italy) Marco Crugnola	(Spain) Santiago Ventura (Spain) Marc López (Italy) Flavio Cipolla (Argentina) Martín Alund
Sep 8 2008	Copa Sevilla; Seville, Spain; Clay €42,500+H	(Spain) Marrero (Spain) Santos; 2–6, 6–2, 10–8	(Brazil) Dutra da Silva (Brazil) Saretta	(Spain) Marc Fornell-Mestres (Italy) Marco Crugnola	(Spain) Santiago Ventura (Spain) Marc López (Italy) Flavio Cipolla (Argentina) Martín Alund
Sep 8 2008	USTA Challenger of Oklahoma; Tulsa, USA; Hard $50,000	(United States) Kevin Kim; 6–3, 3–6, 6–4	(United States) Vincent Spadea	(United States) Bobby Reynolds (United States) Wayne Odesnik	(Canada) Frank Dancevic (United States) Phillip Simmonds (United States) Brendan Evans (United States) Sam Warburg
Sep 8 2008	USTA Challenger of Oklahoma; Tulsa, USA; Hard $50,000	(Australia) Fisher (Australia) Huss; 7–6(4), 6–3	(United States) Ram (United States) Reynolds	(United States) Bobby Reynolds (United States) Wayne Odesnik	(Canada) Frank Dancevic (United States) Phillip Simmonds (United States) Brendan Evans (United States) Sam Warburg
Sep 15 2008	Banja Luka Challenger; Banja Luka, Bosnia and Herzegovina; Clay €30,000+H	(Serbia) Ilija Bozoljac; 6–4, 6–4	(Spain) Daniel Gimeno-Traver	(Hungary) Attila Balázs (Spain) Pablo Santos	(Germany) Dieter Kindlmann (Serbia) Nikola Ćirić (France) Laurent Recouderc (Croatia) Ivan Dodig
Sep 15 2008	Banja Luka Challenger; Banja Luka, Bosnia and Herzegovina; Clay €30,000+H	(Hungary) Balázs (Israel) Hadad; 7–5, 6–2	(Australia) Junaid (Germany) Marx	(Hungary) Attila Balázs (Spain) Pablo Santos	(Germany) Dieter Kindlmann (Serbia) Nikola Ćirić (France) Laurent Recouderc (Croatia) Ivan Dodig
Sep 15 2008	Seguros Bolivar Open Cali; Cali, Colombia; Clay $75,000+H	(Brazil) Marcos Daniel; 6–2 ret.	(Argentina) Leonardo Mayer	(Colombia) Santiago Giraldo (Argentina) Diego Hartfield	(Colombia) Michael Quintero (Argentina) Horacio Zeballos (Brazil) Ricardo Hocevar (Argentina) Brian Dabul
Sep 15 2008	Seguros Bolivar Open Cali; Cali, Colombia; Clay $75,000+H	(Colombia) Cabal (Colombia) Falla; 7–6(6), 6–3	(Argentina) Dabul (Argentina) Zeballos	(Colombia) Santiago Giraldo (Argentina) Diego Hartfield	(Colombia) Michael Quintero (Argentina) Horacio Zeballos (Brazil) Ricardo Hocevar (Argentina) Brian Dabul
Sep 15 2008	Pekao Open; Szczecin, Poland; Clay €106,500+H	(France) Florent Serra; 6–4, 6–3	(Spain) Albert Montañés	(Poland) Łukasz Kubot (Poland) Jerzy Janowicz	(Argentina) Juan Pablo Brzezicki (Spain) Alberto Martín (Poland) Marcin Gawron (Austria) Daniel Köllerer
Sep 15 2008	Pekao Open; Szczecin, Poland; Clay €106,500+H	(Spain) Marrero (Poland) Olejniczak; 7–6(4), 6–3	(Poland) Kubot (Austria) Marach	(Poland) Łukasz Kubot (Poland) Jerzy Janowicz	(Argentina) Juan Pablo Brzezicki (Spain) Alberto Martín (Poland) Marcin Gawron (Austria) Daniel Köllerer
Sep 15 2008	Internazionali di Tennis dell'Umbria; Todi, Italy; Clay €42,500+H	(Italy) Tomas Tenconi; 4–6, 6–3, 6–0	(Spain) Rubén Ramírez Hidalgo	(Italy) Alessio di Mauro (Italy) Marco Crugnola	(Argentina) Martín Alund (Italy) Paolo Lorenzi (Italy) Federico Luzzi (Italy) Gianluca Naso
Sep 15 2008	Internazionali di Tennis dell'Umbria; Todi, Italy; Clay €42,500+H	(Italy) Naso (Italy) Trusendi; 4–6, 7–6(3), 10–4	(Italy) Brizzi (Italy) Motti	(Italy) Alessio di Mauro (Italy) Marco Crugnola	(Argentina) Martín Alund (Italy) Paolo Lorenzi (Italy) Federico Luzzi (Italy) Gianluca Naso
Sep 15 2008	Waco Tennis Challenger; Waco, USA; Hard $50,000	(United States) Vincent Spadea; 6–0, 6–1	(Australia) Joseph Sirianni	(United States) Alex Bogomolov, Jr. (Germany) Benedikt Dorsch	(United States) Todd Widom (United States) Phillip Simmonds (United States) John Isner (Canada) Peter Polansky
Sep 15 2008	Waco Tennis Challenger; Waco, USA; Hard $50,000	(United States) Bogomolov, Jr. (Serbia) Vemić; 6–4, 5–7, 10–8	(United States) A Francis (United States) Monroe	(United States) Alex Bogomolov, Jr. (Germany) Benedikt Dorsch	(United States) Todd Widom (United States) Phillip Simmonds (United States) John Isner (Canada) Peter Polansky
Sep 22 2008	Copa Petrobras Colombia; Bogotá, Colombia; Clay $75,000+H	(Brazil) Marcos Daniel; 6–4, 4–6, 6–4	(Argentina) Horacio Zeballos	(Brazil) Ricardo Hocevar (Colombia) Alejandro Falla	(Argentina) Diego Álvarez (Brazil) Ricardo Mello (Argentina) Mariano Puerta (Argentina) Sergio Roitman
Sep 22 2008	Copa Petrobras Colombia; Bogotá, Colombia; Clay $75,000+H	(Colombia) Cabal (Colombia) Falla; 3–6, 7–6(7), 10–8	(Argentina) Fabbri (Argentina) Zeballos	(Brazil) Ricardo Hocevar (Colombia) Alejandro Falla	(Argentina) Diego Álvarez (Brazil) Ricardo Mello (Argentina) Mariano Puerta (Argentina) Sergio Roitman
Sep 22 2008	Ipsos Bucharest Challenger; Bucharest, Romania; Clay €30,000+H	(Spain) Santiago Ventura; 5–7, 6–4, 6–2	(Romania) Victor Crivoi	(Argentina) Máximo González (Spain) Rubén Ramírez Hidalgo	(Romania) Adrian Cruciat (France) Éric Prodon (Romania) Marius Copil (Germany) Gero Kretschmer
Sep 22 2008	Ipsos Bucharest Challenger; Bucharest, Romania; Clay €30,000+H	(Spain) Ramírez Hidalgo (Spain) Ventura; 6–3, 5–7, 10–6	(Italy) A Arnaboldi (Argentina) González	(Argentina) Máximo González (Spain) Rubén Ramírez Hidalgo	(Romania) Adrian Cruciat (France) Éric Prodon (Romania) Marius Copil (Germany) Gero Kretschmer
Sep 22 2008	Open des Alpes Trophée BNP Paribas; Grenoble, France; Hard (indoor) $50,000+H	(Belgium) Kristof Vliegen; 6–4, 6–3	(France) Alexandre Sidorenko	(France) Jonathan Eysseric (Austria) Martin Fischer	(France) Josselin Ouanna (France) Pierre Metenier (South Africa) Rik de Voest (France) Gary Lugassy
Sep 22 2008	Open des Alpes Trophée BNP Paribas; Grenoble, France; Hard (indoor) $50,000+H	(Austria) Fischer (Austria) Oswald; 6–7(5), 7–5, 10–7	(Belgium) Desein (Belgium) Norman	(France) Jonathan Eysseric (Austria) Martin Fischer	(France) Josselin Ouanna (France) Pierre Metenier (South Africa) Rik de Voest (France) Gary Lugassy
Sep 22 2008	Lubbock Challenger; Lubbock, USA; Hard $50,000	(United States) John Isner; 7–6(2), 4–6, 6–2	(Canada) Frank Dancevic	(Ecuador) Giovanni Lapentti (Serbia) Dušan Vemić	(United States) Todd Widom (United States) Alex Bogomolov, Jr. (United States) Rajeev Ram (United States) Kevin Kim
Sep 22 2008	Lubbock Challenger; Lubbock, USA; Hard $50,000	(Moldova) Borvanov (Russia) Sitak; 6–2, 6–3	(United States) Bogomolov, Jr. (Serbia) Vemić	(Ecuador) Giovanni Lapentti (Serbia) Dušan Vemić	(United States) Todd Widom (United States) Alex Bogomolov, Jr. (United States) Rajeev Ram (United States) Kevin Kim
Sep 22 2008	Tennislife Cup; Naples, Italy; Clay €42,500+H	(Italy) Tomas Tenconi; 6–7(6), 6–3, 6–1	(Algeria) Lamine Ouahab	(Spain) Daniel Muñoz-de la Nava (Germany) Simon Greul	(Italy) Potito Starace (Argentina) Martín Vassallo Argüello (Italy) Alessio di Mauro (Italy) Filippo Volandri
Sep 22 2008	Tennislife Cup; Naples, Italy; Clay €42,500+H	(Italy) Azzaro (Italy) Motti; 6–7(5), 6–3, 10–7	(Bosnia and Herzegovina) Gorcic (Italy) A Maiorano	(Spain) Daniel Muñoz-de la Nava (Germany) Simon Greul	(Italy) Potito Starace (Argentina) Martín Vassallo Argüello (Italy) Alessio di Mauro (Italy) Filippo Volandri
Sep 22 2008	ATP Challenger Trophy Trnava; Trnava, Slovakia; Clay €85,000+H	(Spain) Alberto Martín; 6–2, 6–0	(Germany) Julian Reister	(Czech Republic) Jaroslav Pospíšil (Ukraine) Oleksandr Dolgopolov, Jr.	(Austria) Daniel Köllerer (Belgium) Christophe Rochus (Spain) Daniel Gimeno-Traver (Poland) Dawid Olejniczak
Sep 22 2008	ATP Challenger Trophy Trnava; Trnava, Slovakia; Clay €85,000+H	(Czech Republic) Škoch (Slovakia) Zelenay; 6–3, 6–1	(Austria) Köllerer (Slovakia) Mertiňák	(Czech Republic) Jaroslav Pospíšil (Ukraine) Oleksandr Dolgopolov, Jr.	(Austria) Daniel Köllerer (Belgium) Christophe Rochus (Spain) Daniel Gimeno-Traver (Poland) Dawid Olejniczak
Sep 29 2008	Copa Petrobras Brazil; Aracaju, Brazil; Clay $75,000+H	(Chile) Paul Capdeville; 7–5, 6–4	(Brazil) Thiago Alves	(Spain) Carles Poch-Gradin (Argentina) Diego Junqueira	(Brazil) Rogério Dutra da Silva (Chile) Nicolás Massú (Argentina) Brian Dabul (Brazil) João Souza
Sep 29 2008	Copa Petrobras Brazil; Aracaju, Brazil; Clay $75,000+H	(Argentina) Aranguren (Brazil) Ferreiro; 6–4, 6–4	(Brazil) Alves (Brazil) Souza	(Spain) Carles Poch-Gradin (Argentina) Diego Junqueira	(Brazil) Rogério Dutra da Silva (Chile) Nicolás Massú (Argentina) Brian Dabul (Brazil) João Souza
Sep 29 2008	Ethias Trophy; Mons, Belgium; Hard (indoor) €106,500+H	(Russia) Teymuraz Gabashvili; 6–4, 6–4	(France) Édouard Roger-Vasselin	(Belgium) Christophe Rochus (Belgium) Olivier Rochus	(Belgium) Steve Darcis (Australia) Chris Guccione (Russia) Igor Kunitsyn (France) Fabrice Santoro
Sep 29 2008	Ethias Trophy; Mons, Belgium; Hard (indoor) €106,500+H	(Slovakia) Mertiňák (Croatia) Zovko; 7–5, 6–3	(Switzerland) Allegro (Romania) Tecău	(Belgium) Christophe Rochus (Belgium) Olivier Rochus	(Belgium) Steve Darcis (Australia) Chris Guccione (Russia) Igor Kunitsyn (France) Fabrice Santoro
Sep 29 2008	Open Tarragona Costa Daurada; Tarragona, Spain; Clay €42,500+H	(Spain) Alberto Martín; 6–7(5), 6–4, 6–4	(Germany) Simon Greul	(Spain) Miguel Ángel López Jaén (Algeria) Lamine Ouahab	(Netherlands) Matwe Middelkoop (Spain) Pablo Santos (Argentina) Máximo González (Spain) Pere Riba
Sep 29 2008	Open Tarragona Costa Daurada; Tarragona, Spain; Clay €42,500+H	(Czech Republic) Karol (Austria) Köllerer; 6–2, 6–2	(Spain) Fornell-Mestres (Spain) López	(Spain) Miguel Ángel López Jaén (Algeria) Lamine Ouahab	(Netherlands) Matwe Middelkoop (Spain) Pablo Santos (Argentina) Máximo González (Spain) Pere Riba

=== October ===
Week of	Tournament	Winner	Runner-up	Semi finalists	Quarter finalist
Oct 6 2008	Copa Petrobras Paraguay; Asunción, Paraguay; Clay $75,000+H	(Argentina) Martín Vassallo Argüello; 3–6, 6–3, 7–6(2)	(Argentina) Leonardo Mayer	(Uruguay) Pablo Cuevas (Argentina) Brian Dabul	(Peru) Luis Horna (Portugal) Rui Machado (Brazil) Franco Ferreiro (Argentina) Diego Hartfield
Oct 6 2008	Copa Petrobras Paraguay; Asunción, Paraguay; Clay $75,000+H	(Argentina) Fabbri (Argentina) Mayer; 7–5, 6–4	(Argentina) García (Argentina) Hood	(Uruguay) Pablo Cuevas (Argentina) Brian Dabul	(Peru) Luis Horna (Portugal) Rui Machado (Brazil) Franco Ferreiro (Argentina) Diego Hartfield
Oct 6 2008	Cyclus Open de Tenis; Florianópolis, Brazil; Clay $35,000+H	(Chile) Nicolás Massú; 6–7(4), 6–2, 6–1	(France) Olivier Patience	(Argentina) Diego Junqueira (Australia) Peter Luczak	(Spain) Pablo Santos (Brazil) Thiago Alves (Brazil) Júlio Silva (Chile) Paul Capdeville
Oct 6 2008	Cyclus Open de Tenis; Florianópolis, Brazil; Clay $35,000+H	(Brazil) Dutra da Silva (Brazil) Silva; 3–6, 6–4, 10–4	(Brazil) Hocevar (Brazil) A Miele	(Argentina) Diego Junqueira (Australia) Peter Luczak	(Spain) Pablo Santos (Brazil) Thiago Alves (Brazil) Júlio Silva (Chile) Paul Capdeville
Oct 6 2008	Open de Rennes; Rennes, France; Hard (indoor) €42,500+H	(France) Josselin Ouanna; 6–2, 6–3	(France) Adrian Mannarino	(France) David Guez (France) Alexandre Sidorenko	(Germany) Andreas Beck (France) Sébastien de Chaunac (France) Édouard Roger-Vasselin (Germany) Dieter Kindlmann
Oct 6 2008	Open de Rennes; Rennes, France; Hard (indoor) €42,500+H	(United Kingdom) Auckland (Belgium) Norman; 6–3, 6–4	(Switzerland) Allegro (Romania) Tecău	(France) David Guez (France) Alexandre Sidorenko	(Germany) Andreas Beck (France) Sébastien de Chaunac (France) Édouard Roger-Vasselin (Germany) Dieter Kindlmann
Oct 6 2008	The Swanston Challenger; Sacramento, USA; Hard $50,000	(United States) Donald Young; 6–4, 6–1	(United States) Robert Kendrick	(United States) Wayne Odesnik (United States) Michael Russell	(United States) Scoville Jenkins (United States) John Isner (Australia) Carsten Ball (United States) Alex Bogomolov, Jr.
Oct 6 2008	The Swanston Challenger; Sacramento, USA; Hard $50,000	(United States) B. Battistone (United States) D. Battistone; 1–6, 6–3, 10–4	(United States) Isner (United States) Ram	(United States) Wayne Odesnik (United States) Michael Russell	(United States) Scoville Jenkins (United States) John Isner (Australia) Carsten Ball (United States) Alex Bogomolov, Jr.
Oct 13 2008	Mercedes Benz of Calabasas; Calabasas, USA; Hard $50,000	(United States) Vincent Spadea; 7–6(5), 6–4	(United States) Sam Warburg	(Canada) Frank Dancevic (United States) Donald Young	(India) Prakash Amritraj (United States) Michael Russell (United States) Ryan Sweeting (United States) Robert Kendrick
Oct 13 2008	Mercedes Benz of Calabasas; Calabasas, USA; Hard $50,000	(Serbia) Bozoljac (Serbia) Vemić; 1–6, 6–3, 13–11	(India) Devvarman (Australia) Healey	(Canada) Frank Dancevic (United States) Donald Young	(India) Prakash Amritraj (United States) Michael Russell (United States) Ryan Sweeting (United States) Robert Kendrick
Oct 13 2008	Kobstaedernes ATP Challenger; Kolding, Denmark; Hard (indoor) €42,500+H	(Croatia) Roko Karanušić; 6–4, 6–4	(Slovakia) Karol Beck	(Austria) Martin Fischer (United States) Brendan Evans	(Austria) Alexander Peya (France) Thierry Ascione (Australia) Joseph Sirianni (Netherlands) Matwe Middelkoop
Oct 13 2008	Kobstaedernes ATP Challenger; Kolding, Denmark; Hard (indoor) €42,500+H	(United States) Evans (South Africa) Haggard; 6–3, 7–5	(United Kingdom) Auckland (Australia) Perry	(Austria) Martin Fischer (United States) Brendan Evans	(Austria) Alexander Peya (France) Thierry Ascione (Australia) Joseph Sirianni (Netherlands) Matwe Middelkoop
Oct 13 2008	Copa Petrobras Uruguay; Montevideo, Uruguay; Clay $75,000+H	(Australia) Peter Luczak; W/O	(Chile) Nicolás Massú	(Spain) Santiago Ventura (Uruguay) Pablo Cuevas	(Monaco) Jean-René Lisnard (Argentina) Leonardo Mayer (Spain) Rubén Ramírez Hidalgo (Austria) Daniel Köllerer
Oct 13 2008	Copa Petrobras Uruguay; Montevideo, Uruguay; Clay $75,000+H	(Brazil) Ferreiro (Brazil) Saretta; 6–3, 6–2	(Spain) Gimeno-Traver (Spain) Ramírez Hidalgo	(Spain) Santiago Ventura (Uruguay) Pablo Cuevas	(Monaco) Jean-René Lisnard (Argentina) Leonardo Mayer (Spain) Rubén Ramírez Hidalgo (Austria) Daniel Köllerer
Oct 13 2008	Tashkent Challenger; Tashkent, Uzbekistan; Hard $125,000+H	(Chinese Taipei) Yen-Hsun Lu; 6–3, 6–2	(France) Mathieu Montcourt	(Germany) Michael Berrer (Uzbekistan) Denis Istomin	(Germany) Björn Phau (Czech Republic) Pavel Šnobel (Germany) Denis Gremelmayr (Israel) Dudi Sela
Oct 13 2008	Tashkent Challenger; Tashkent, Uzbekistan; Hard $125,000+H	(Italy) Cipolla (Czech Republic) Šnobel; 6–3, 6–4	(Russia) Elgin (Russia) Kudryavtsev	(Germany) Michael Berrer (Uzbekistan) Denis Istomin	(Germany) Björn Phau (Czech Republic) Pavel Šnobel (Germany) Denis Gremelmayr (Israel) Dudi Sela
Oct 20 2008	Copa Petrobras Argentina; Buenos Aires, Argentina; Clay $75,000+H	(Argentina) Martín Vassallo Argüello; 6–3, 4–6, 7–5	(Spain) Rubén Ramírez Hidalgo	(Argentina) Sergio Roitman (Brazil) Thomaz Bellucci	(Australia) Peter Luczak (Argentina) Diego Junqueira (Spain) Daniel Muñoz-de la Nava (France) Olivier Patience
Oct 20 2008	Copa Petrobras Argentina; Buenos Aires, Argentina; Clay $75,000+H	(Argentina) González (Argentina) Prieto; 7–5, 6–3	(Brazil) Bellucci (Spain) Ramírez Hidalgo	(Argentina) Sergio Roitman (Brazil) Thomaz Bellucci	(Australia) Peter Luczak (Argentina) Diego Junqueira (Spain) Daniel Muñoz-de la Nava (France) Olivier Patience
Oct 20 2008	Samsung Securities Cup; Seoul, Korea; Hard $125,000+H	(South Korea) Hyung-Taik Lee; 6–4, 6–0	(Czech Republic) Ivo Minář	(Thailand) Danai Udomchoke (Chinese Taipei) Yen-Hsun Lu	(Romania) Adrian Cruciat (South Africa) Rik de Voest (Germany) Daniel Brands (Germany) Björn Phau
Oct 20 2008	Samsung Securities Cup; Seoul, Korea; Hard $125,000+H	(Poland) Kubot (Austria) Marach; 7–5, 4–6, 10–6	(Thailand) Ratiwatana (Thailand) Ratiwatana	(Thailand) Danai Udomchoke (Chinese Taipei) Yen-Hsun Lu	(Romania) Adrian Cruciat (South Africa) Rik de Voest (Germany) Daniel Brands (Germany) Björn Phau
Oct 27 2008	Lambertz Open by STAWAG; Aachen, Germany; Carpet (indoor) €42,500+H	(Kazakhstan) Evgeny Korolev; 7–6(5), 7–6(3)	(Belgium) Ruben Bemelmans	(Netherlands) Jesse Huta Galung (Latvia) Andis Juška	(Germany) Philipp Petzschner (Germany) Benedikt Dorsch (Ukraine) Sergiy Stakhovsky (Belgium) Niels Desein
Oct 27 2008	Lambertz Open by STAWAG; Aachen, Germany; Carpet (indoor) €42,500+H	(Germany) Kohlmann (Germany) Waske; 6–4, 6–4	(United States) Parrott (Slovakia) Polášek	(Netherlands) Jesse Huta Galung (Latvia) Andis Juška	(Germany) Philipp Petzschner (Germany) Benedikt Dorsch (Ukraine) Sergiy Stakhovsky (Belgium) Niels Desein
Oct 27 2008	Flea Market Cup Busan Challenger Tennis; Busan, South Korea; Hard $100,000+H	(Czech Republic) Ivo Minář; 6–1, 2–0 ret.	(United States) Alex Bogomolov, Jr.	(United States) Kevin Kim (Germany) Björn Phau	(Chinese Taipei) Yen-Hsun Lu (Germany) Michael Berrer (Japan) Go Soeda (South Korea) Hyung-Taik Lee
Oct 27 2008	Flea Market Cup Busan Challenger Tennis; Busan, South Korea; Hard $100,000+H	(South Africa) de Voest (Australia) Fisher; 6–2, 2–6, 10–6	(Sweden) Brunström (Netherlands Antilles) Rojer	(United States) Kevin Kim (Germany) Björn Phau	(Chinese Taipei) Yen-Hsun Lu (Germany) Michael Berrer (Japan) Go Soeda (South Korea) Hyung-Taik Lee
Oct 27 2008	Bancolombia Open; Cali, Colombia; Clay $125,000+H	(Austria) Daniel Köllerer; 6–4, 6–3	(Chile) Paul Capdeville	(Argentina) Máximo González (Argentina) Martín Vassallo Argüello	(Brazil) Marcos Daniel (Romania) Victor Crivoi (Argentina) Diego Junqueira (Chile) Nicolás Massú
Oct 27 2008	Bancolombia Open; Cali, Colombia; Clay $125,000+H	(Austria) Köllerer (Serbia) Pašanski; 6–7(4), 6–4, 10–4	(Argentina) Junqueira (Australia) Luczak	(Argentina) Máximo González (Argentina) Martín Vassallo Argüello	(Brazil) Marcos Daniel (Romania) Victor Crivoi (Argentina) Diego Junqueira (Chile) Nicolás Massú
Oct 27 2008	Ford Tennis Championships; Louisville, USA; Hard (indoor) $50,000+H	(United States) Robert Kendrick; 6–1, 6–1	(United States) Donald Young	(Serbia) Ilija Bozoljac (United States) Jesse Levine	(United States) Vincent Spadea (South Africa) Kevin Anderson (Serbia) Dušan Vemić (Canada) Peter Polansky
Oct 27 2008	Ford Tennis Championships; Louisville, USA; Hard (indoor) $50,000+H	(India) Amritraj (United States) Levine; 6–3, 7–6(10)	(Canada) Dancevic (Serbia) Vemić	(Serbia) Ilija Bozoljac (United States) Jesse Levine	(United States) Vincent Spadea (South Africa) Kevin Anderson (Serbia) Dušan Vemić (Canada) Peter Polansky

=== November ===
Week of	Tournament	Winner	Runner-up	Semi finalists	Quarter finalist
Nov 3 2008	President's Cup; Astana, Kazakhstan; Hard (indoor) $75,000	(Kazakhstan) Andrey Golubev; 1–6, 7–5, 6–3	(France) Laurent Recouderc	(Turkey) Marsel İlhan (Russia) Alexander Kudryavtsev	(South Korea) Woong-Sun Jun (Russia) Konstantin Kravchuk (Switzerland) Marco Chiudinelli (Switzerland) George Bastl
Nov 3 2008	President's Cup; Astana, Kazakhstan; Hard (indoor) $75,000	(Russia) Elgin (Russia) Kudryavtsev; 6–4, 6–7(8), 10–6	(Switzerland) Bastl (Switzerland) Chiudinelli	(Turkey) Marsel İlhan (Russia) Alexander Kudryavtsev	(South Korea) Woong-Sun Jun (Russia) Konstantin Kravchuk (Switzerland) Marco Chiudinelli (Switzerland) George Bastl
Nov 3 2008	Tatra Banka Slovak Open; Bratislava, Slovak Republic; Hard (indoor) €106,500+H	(Czech Republic) Jan Hernych; 6–2, 6–4	(Switzerland) Stéphane Bohli	(Spain) Marcel Granollers (Australia) Chris Guccione	(Czech Republic) Jiří Vaněk (Ukraine) Sergiy Stakhovsky (Germany) Philipp Petzschner (Austria) Alexander Peya
Nov 3 2008	Tatra Banka Slovak Open; Bratislava, Slovak Republic; Hard (indoor) €106,500+H	(Czech Republic) Čermák (Poland) Kubot; 6–4, 6–4	(Germany) Petzschner (Austria) Peya	(Spain) Marcel Granollers (Australia) Chris Guccione	(Czech Republic) Jiří Vaněk (Ukraine) Sergiy Stakhovsky (Germany) Philipp Petzschner (Austria) Alexander Peya
Nov 3 2008	Bauer Cup; Eckental, Germany; Carpet (indoor) €35,000+H	(Germany) Denis Gremelmayr; 6–2, 7–5	(Croatia) Roko Karanušić	(Germany) Simon Greul (Germany) Alexander Waske	(Uzbekistan) Farrukh Dustov (Germany) Daniel Brands (Austria) Stefan Koubek (Germany) Dieter Kindlmann
Nov 3 2008	Bauer Cup; Eckental, Germany; Carpet (indoor) €35,000+H	(Switzerland) Allegro (Romania) Tecău; 6–3, 3–6, 10–7	(United Kingdom) Auckland (Brazil) Torres	(Germany) Simon Greul (Germany) Alexander Waske	(Uzbekistan) Farrukh Dustov (Germany) Daniel Brands (Austria) Stefan Koubek (Germany) Dieter Kindlmann
Nov 3 2008	Challenger Ciudad de Guayaquil; Guayaquil, Ecuador; Clay $50,000+H	(Argentina) Sergio Roitman; 7–6(5), 6–4	(Argentina) Brian Dabul	(Spain) Rubén Ramírez Hidalgo (Spain) Alberto Martín	(Argentina) Máximo González (United States) Wayne Odesnik (Brazil) João Souza (Brazil) Ricardo Hocevar
Nov 3 2008	Challenger Ciudad de Guayaquil; Guayaquil, Ecuador; Clay $50,000+H	(Argentina) Decoud (Colombia) Giraldo; 6–4, 6–4	(Brazil) Alves (Brazil) Hocevar	(Spain) Rubén Ramírez Hidalgo (Spain) Alberto Martín	(Argentina) Máximo González (United States) Wayne Odesnik (Brazil) João Souza (Brazil) Ricardo Hocevar
Nov 3 2008	Music City Challenger; Nashville, USA; Hard (indoor) $75,000	(United States) Robert Kendrick; 6–3, 7–5	(India) Somdev Devvarman	(United States) Michael Russell (United States) Bobby Reynolds	(South Africa) Kevin Anderson (United States) Scoville Jenkins (United States) Jesse Levine (United States) Kevin Kim
Nov 3 2008	Music City Challenger; Nashville, USA; Hard (indoor) $75,000	(Australia) Ball (United States) Rettenmaier; 6–4, 7–5	(India) Mankad (India) Singh	(United States) Michael Russell (United States) Bobby Reynolds	(South Africa) Kevin Anderson (United States) Scoville Jenkins (United States) Jesse Levine (United States) Kevin Kim
Nov 3 2008	Challenger Banque Nationale; Rimouski, Canada; Carpet (indoor) $35,000+H	(United States) Ryan Sweeting; 6–4, 7–6(3)	(Denmark) Kristian Pless	(United Kingdom) Joshua Goodall (Canada) Peter Polansky	(France) Gary Lugassy (United States) Alex Kuznetsov (United Kingdom) James Ward (United States) Todd Widom
Nov 3 2008	Challenger Banque Nationale; Rimouski, Canada; Carpet (indoor) $35,000+H	(Canada) Pospisil (Canada) Raonic; 5–7, 6–4, 10–6	(Denmark) Pless (Sweden) Ryderstedt	(United Kingdom) Joshua Goodall (Canada) Peter Polansky	(France) Gary Lugassy (United States) Alex Kuznetsov (United Kingdom) James Ward (United States) Todd Widom
Nov 10 2008	JSM Challenger of Champaign; Champaign, USA; Hard (indoor) $50,000+H	(South Africa) Kevin Anderson; 6–3, 6–4	(United States) Kevin Kim	(United States) Wayne Odesnik (United States) Sam Warburg	(Australia) Carsten Ball (Canada) Frank Dancevic (United States) Taylor Dent (Paraguay) Ramón Delgado
Nov 10 2008	JSM Challenger of Champaign; Champaign, USA; Hard (indoor) $50,000+H	(United States) Ram (United States) Reynolds; 3–6, 6–3, 10–6	(France) Charroin (France) Tourte	(United States) Wayne Odesnik (United States) Sam Warburg	(Australia) Carsten Ball (Canada) Frank Dancevic (United States) Taylor Dent (Paraguay) Ramón Delgado
Nov 10 2008	PEOPLEnet Cup; Dnipropetrovsk, Ukraine; Hard (indoor) $125,000+H	(France) Fabrice Santoro; 6–2, 6–3	(Romania) Victor Hănescu	(Czech Republic) Jan Hernych (Austria) Stefan Koubek	(Slovakia) Karol Beck (Ukraine) Sergiy Stakhovsky (Romania) Victor Crivoi (Uzbekistan) Denis Istomin
Nov 10 2008	PEOPLEnet Cup; Dnipropetrovsk, Ukraine; Hard (indoor) $125,000+H	(Argentina) Cañas (Russia) Tursunov; 6–3, 7–6(5)	(Poland) Kubot (Austria) Marach	(Czech Republic) Jan Hernych (Austria) Stefan Koubek	(Slovakia) Karol Beck (Ukraine) Sergiy Stakhovsky (Romania) Victor Crivoi (Uzbekistan) Denis Istomin
Nov 10 2008	Caversham International Tennis Tournament; Jersey, UK; Hard (indoor) €30,000+H	(France) Adrian Mannarino; 7–6(4), 7–6(4)	(Germany) Andreas Beck	(Australia) Chris Guccione (Czech Republic) Tomáš Zíb	(Germany) Dominik Meffert (Czech Republic) Tomáš Cakl (United Kingdom) Joshua Goodall (Germany) Tobias Kamke
Nov 10 2008	Caversham International Tennis Tournament; Jersey, UK; Hard (indoor) €30,000+H	(United Kingdom) Fleming (United Kingdom) Skupski; 6–3, 6–2	(Australia) Guccione (Brazil) Torres	(Australia) Chris Guccione (Czech Republic) Tomáš Zíb	(Germany) Dominik Meffert (Czech Republic) Tomáš Cakl (United Kingdom) Joshua Goodall (Germany) Tobias Kamke
Nov 10 2008	Seguros Bolivar Open Medellín; Medellín, Colombia; Clay $35,000+H	(Argentina) Leonardo Mayer; 6–4, 7–5	(Argentina) Sergio Roitman	(Brazil) João Souza (Argentina) Sebastián Decoud	(Colombia) Santiago Giraldo (Brazil) Thiago Alves (Portugal) Frederico Gil (Colombia) Carlos Salamanca
Nov 10 2008	Seguros Bolivar Open Medellín; Medellín, Colombia; Clay $35,000+H	(Colombia) Cabal (Colombia) Falla; 3–4 ret.	(Argentina) Amado (Dominican Republic) Estrella	(Brazil) João Souza (Argentina) Sebastián Decoud	(Colombia) Santiago Giraldo (Brazil) Thiago Alves (Portugal) Frederico Gil (Colombia) Carlos Salamanca
Nov 17 2008	IPP Open; Helsinki, Finland; Hard (indoor) €106,500+H	(Russia) Dmitry Tursunov; 6–4, 6–3	(Slovakia) Karol Beck	(Russia) Igor Kunitsyn (Finland) Jarkko Nieminen	(Germany) Tobias Kamke (Czech Republic) Jan Hernych (Russia) Evgeny Donskoy (Poland) Łukasz Kubot
Nov 17 2008	IPP Open; Helsinki, Finland; Hard (indoor) €106,500+H	(Poland) Kubot (Austria) Marach; 6–7(2), 7–6(7), 10–6	(United States) Butorac (Croatia) Zovko	(Russia) Igor Kunitsyn (Finland) Jarkko Nieminen	(Germany) Tobias Kamke (Czech Republic) Jan Hernych (Russia) Evgeny Donskoy (Poland) Łukasz Kubot
Nov 17 2008	Knoxville Challenger; Knoxville, USA; Hard (indoor) $50,000	(United States) Bobby Reynolds; 6–4, 6–2	(Slovenia) Luka Gregorc	(Canada) Frank Dancevic (Serbia) Filip Krajinović	(United States) Michael Russell (South Africa) Kevin Anderson (United States) Alex Kuznetsov (United States) Rajeev Ram
Nov 17 2008	Knoxville Challenger; Knoxville, USA; Hard (indoor) $50,000	(South Africa) Anderson (New Zealand) Jones; 3–6, 6–0, 10–7	(United States) Ram (United States) Reynolds	(Canada) Frank Dancevic (Serbia) Filip Krajinović	(United States) Michael Russell (South Africa) Kevin Anderson (United States) Alex Kuznetsov (United States) Rajeev Ram
Nov 17 2008	Challenger Britania Zavaleta; Puebla, Mexico; Hard $35,000+H	(Switzerland) Michael Lammer; 6–2, 3–6, 6–4	(Austria) Rainer Eitzinger	(Italy) Riccardo Ghedin (Slovenia) Grega Žemlja	(Slovenia) Blaž Kavčič (Italy) Claudio Grassi (Argentina) Horacio Zeballos (Mexico) Santiago González
Nov 17 2008	Challenger Britania Zavaleta; Puebla, Mexico; Hard $35,000+H	(United States) Monroe (United States) Nunez; 4–6, 6–3, 10–6	(Mexico) Garza (Mexico) González	(Italy) Riccardo Ghedin (Slovenia) Grega Žemlja	(Slovenia) Blaž Kavčič (Italy) Claudio Grassi (Argentina) Horacio Zeballos (Mexico) Santiago González
Nov 17 2008	Keio Challenger International Tennis Tournament; Yokohama, Japan; Hard $35,000+H	(South Korea) Hyung-Taik Lee; 7–5, 6–3	(Japan) Go Soeda	(Denmark) Frederik Nielsen (Australia) Samuel Groth	(Austria) Martin Slanar (Germany) Julian Reister (Japan) Yūichi Sugita (Pakistan) Aisam-ul-Haq Qureshi
Nov 17 2008	Keio Challenger International Tennis Tournament; Yokohama, Japan; Hard $35,000+H	(Czech Republic) Cakl (Slovakia) Semjan; 6–3, 7–6(1)	(United States) Evans (Austria) Slanar	(Denmark) Frederik Nielsen (Australia) Samuel Groth	(Austria) Martin Slanar (Germany) Julian Reister (Japan) Yūichi Sugita (Pakistan) Aisam-ul-Haq Qureshi
Nov 24 2008	Abierto Internacional Varonil Ciudad de Cancún; Cancún, Mexico; Clay $35,000+H	(Slovenia) Grega Žemlja; 6–2, 6–1	(Argentina) Martín Alund	(Spain) Fernando Vicente (Portugal) Rui Machado	(Austria) Rainer Eitzinger (Portugal) Frederico Gil (United States) Kevin Kim (Argentina) Brian Dabul
Nov 24 2008	Abierto Internacional Varonil Ciudad de Cancún; Cancún, Mexico; Clay $35,000+H	(Poland) Kubot (Austria) Marach; 6–1, 6–2	(Chinese Taipei) Lee (Chinese Taipei) Yang	(Spain) Fernando Vicente (Portugal) Rui Machado	(Austria) Rainer Eitzinger (Portugal) Frederico Gil (United States) Kevin Kim (Argentina) Brian Dabul
Nov 24 2008	Lima Challenger; Lima, Peru; Clay $50,000	(Argentina) Martín Vassallo Argüello; 6–2, 4–6, 6–4	(Argentina) Sergio Roitman	(Spain) Carles Poch-Gradin (Peru) Luis Horna	(Argentina) Diego Junqueira (Argentina) Leonardo Mayer (Argentina) Mariano Puerta (Argentina) Juan-Martín Aranguren
Nov 24 2008	Lima Challenger; Lima, Peru; Clay $50,000	(Peru) Horna (Argentina) Prieto; 6–3, 6–3	(Paraguay) Delgado (Brazil) Silva	(Spain) Carles Poch-Gradin (Peru) Luis Horna	(Argentina) Diego Junqueira (Argentina) Leonardo Mayer (Argentina) Mariano Puerta (Argentina) Juan-Martín Aranguren
Nov 24 2008	Dunlop World Challenge; Toyota City, Japan; Carpet (indoor) $35,000+H	(Japan) Go Soeda; 6–2, 7–6(7)	(South Korea) Hyung-Taik Lee	(Japan) Takao Suzuki (France) Sébastien de Chaunac	(Japan) Tatsuma Ito (South Korea) Im Kyu-tae (Thailand) Danai Udomchoke (United States) Brendan Evans
Nov 24 2008	Dunlop World Challenge; Toyota City, Japan; Carpet (indoor) $35,000+H	(Denmark) Nielsen (Pakistan) Qureshi; 7–5, 6–3	(Chinese Taipei) Chen (Poland) Panfil	(Japan) Takao Suzuki (France) Sébastien de Chaunac	(Japan) Tatsuma Ito (South Korea) Im Kyu-tae (Thailand) Danai Udomchoke (United States) Brendan Evans

+H: Any Challenger or Futures providing hospitality shall receive the points of the next highest prize money level in that category$. /€25,000+H Challengers receive points shown at$/€50,000. Monies shown for Challengers and Futures are on-site prize amounts.

== Statistical Information ==
List of players and ATP challenger titles won, last name alphabetically:

- (Brazil) Thomaz Bellucci – Santiago, Florianópolis, Rabat, Tunis (4)
- (Russia) Teymuraz Gabashvili – Telde, Karlsruhe, Milan, Mons (4)
- (Japan) Go Soeda – Kyoto, Busan, New Delhi, Toyota City (4)
- (Belgium) Kristof Vliegen – Wrocław, Geneva, Düsseldorf, Grenoble (4)
- (Brazil) Marcos Daniel – Bogotá, Cali, Bogotá (3)
- (France) Nicolas Devilder – Braunschweig, Constanţa, Poznań (3)
- (Argentina) Diego Junqueira – Sanremo, Rimini, Como (3)
- (Chinese Taipei) Yen-Hsun Lu – Waikoloa, New Delhi, Tashkent (3)
- (Spain) Iván Navarro – Meknes, Córdoba, Medjugorje (3)
- (United States) Bobby Reynolds – Tallahassee, Baton Rouge, Knoxville (3)
- (Argentina) Eduardo Schwank – Cremona, Rome, Bordeaux (3)
- (Argentina) Martín Vassallo Argüello – Asunción, Buenos Aires, Lima (3)
- (Spain) Pablo Andújar – Vigo, San Sebastian (2)
- (Germany) Andreas Beck – Sarajevo, Dresden (2)
- (Serbia) Ilija Bozoljac – Ljubljana, Banja Luka (2)
- (Chile) Paul Capdeville – Binghamton, Aracaju (2)
- (Argentina) Brian Dabul – San Luis Potosí, Campos do Jordão (2)
- (United States) Amer Delic – Dallas, Carson (2)
- (Russia) Michail Elgin – Saransk, Samarkand (2)
- (Italy) Fabio Fognini – Turin, Genoa (2)
- (Portugal) Frederico Gil – Sassuolo, Istanbul (2)
- (Spain) Daniel Gimeno-Traver – Aarhus, Brașov (2)
- (Russia) (Kazakhstan) Andrey Golubev – Heilbronn, Astana (2)
- (Germany) Simon Greul – Freudenstadt, Alphen (2)
- (Czech Republic) Jan Hernych – Prague, Bratislava (2)
- (Uzbekistan) Denis Istomin – Bukhara, Karshi (2)
- (Croatia) Roko Karanušić – Belgrade, Kolding (2)
- (United States) Robert Kendrick – Louisville, Nashville (2)
- (United States) Kevin Kim – Aptos, Tulsa (2)
- (Austria) Daniel Köllerer – Fürth, Cali (2)
- (Ecuador) Giovanni Lapentti – Manta, Quito (2)
- (South Korea) Hyung-Taik Lee – Seoul, Yokohama (2)
- (Spain) Alberto Martín – Trnava, Tarragona (2)
- (Chile) Nicolás Massú – Rijeka, Florianópolis (2)
- (Peru) Iván Miranda – Salinas, Tunica (2)
- (France) Mathieu Montcourt – Reggio Emilia, Tampere (2)
- (Luxembourg) Gilles Müller – Humacao, İzmir (2)
- (Sweden) Björn Rehnquist – Guangzhou, Manchester (2)
- (Belgium) Christophe Rochus – Saint-Brieuc, Zagreb (2)
- (United States) Vincent Spadea – Waco, Calabasas (2)
- (Italy) Tomas Tenconi – Todi, Naples (2)
- (Italy) Filippo Volandri – San Marino, Cordenons (2)
- (Brazil) Thiago Alves – São Paulo (1)
- (South Africa) Kevin Anderson – Champaign (1)
- (France) Thierry Ascione – Cherbourg (1)
- (Morocco) Younes El Aynaoui – Chiasso (1)
- (United Kingdom) Alex Bogdanovic – Granby (1)
- (Switzerland) Stéphane Bohli – Lanzarote (1)
- (Germany) Daniel Brands – Timișoara (1)
- (Argentina) Agustín Calleri – Prostějov (1)
- (France) Jérémy Chardy – Graz (1)
- (Italy) Flavio Cipolla – Nouméa (1)
- (Romania) Victor Crivoi – Manerbio (1)
- (Canada) Frank Dancevic – Surbiton (1)
- (Argentina) Sebastián Decoud – Almaty (1)
- (India) Somdev Devvarman – Lexington (1)
- (Czech Republic) Lukáš Dlouhý – Bronx (1)
- (Germany) Benedikt Dorsch – Penza (1)
- (Mexico) Bruno Echagaray – León (1)
- (France) Marc Gicquel – Besançon (1)
- (Argentina) Máximo González – San Benedetto (1)
- (Mexico) Santiago González – Belo Horizonte (1)
- (Spain) Marcel Granollers – Tanger (1)
- (Germany) Denis Gremelmayr – Eckental (1)
- (Netherlands) Robin Haase – Sunrise (1)
- (Peru) Luis Horna – Lugano (1)
- (Netherlands) Jesse Huta Galung – Scheveningen (1)
- (Turkey) Marsel İlhan – Ramat Hasharon (1)
- (United States) John Isner – Lubbock (1)
- (Germany) Dieter Kindlmann – New Delhi (1)
- (Kazakhstan) Evgeny Korolev – Aachen (1)
- (Poland) Łukasz Kubot – Oberstaufen (1)
- (Russia) (Kazakhstan) Mikhail Kukushkin – Barletta (1)
- (Russia) Igor Kunitsyn – Donetsk (1)
- (Switzerland) Michael Lammer – Puebla (1)
- (United States) Jesse Levine – Bradenton (1)
- (Croatia) Ivan Ljubičić – East London (1)
- (Italy) Paolo Lorenzi – Alessandria (1)
- (Australia) Peter Luczak – Montevideo (1)
- (France) Nicolas Mahut – Orléans (1)
- (Belgium) Xavier Malisse – Moncton (1)
- (France) Adrian Mannarino – Jersey (1)
- (Argentina) Leonardo Mayer – Medellín (1)
- (Czech Republic) Ivo Minář – Busan (1)
- (France) Gaël Monfils – Marrakech (1)
- (Spain) Albert Montañés – Monza (1)
- (Republic of Ireland) Conor Niland – New Delhi (1)
- (Japan) Kei Nishikori – Bermuda (1)
- (Poland) Dawid Olejniczak – Mexico City (1)
- (France) Josselin Ouanna – Rennes (1)
- (France) Olivier Patience – Cherkassy (1)
- (France) Éric Prodon – Miami (1)
- (Argentina) Mariano Puerta – Bogotá (1)
- (United States) Rajeev Ram – Winnetka (1)
- (Spain) Rubén Ramírez Hidalgo – La Serena (1)
- (France) Laurent Recouderc – Bytom (1)
- (Spain) Pere Riba – Seville (1)
- (Argentina) Sergio Roitman – Guayaquil (1)
- (Czech Republic) Lukáš Rosol – Košice (1)
- (France) Fabrice Santoro – Dnipropetrovsk (1)
- (Israel) Dudi Sela – Vancouver (1)
- (Italy) Andreas Seppi – Bergamo (1)
- (France) Florent Serra – Szczecin (1)
- (Australia) Robert Smeets – Dublin (1)
- (Czech Republic) Pavel Šnobel – Fergana (1)
- (Republic of Ireland) Louk Sorensen – Wolfsburg (1)
- (Ukraine) Sergiy Stakhovsky – Segovia (1)
- (Italy) Potito Starace – Naples (1)
- (United States) Ryan Sweeting – Rimouski (1)
- (Russia) Dmitry Tursunov – Helsinki (1)
- (Romania) Adrian Ungur – Sofia (1)
- (Czech Republic) Jiří Vaněk – Ostrava (1)
- (Spain) Santiago Ventura – Bucharest (1)
- (Netherlands) Martin Verkerk – Athens (1)
- (United States) Michael Yani – Yuba City (1)
- (United States) Donald Young – Sacramento (1)
- (Argentina) Horacio Zeballos – Recanati (1)
- (Slovenia) Grega Žemlja – Cancún (1)

The following players won their first ATP challenger title:

- (Brazil) Thomaz Bellucci – Santiago
- (Switzerland) Stéphane Bohli – Lanzarote
- (Germany) Daniel Brands – Timișoara
- (Romania) Victor Crivoi – Manerbio
- (India) Somdev Devvarman – Lexington
- (Mexico) Bruno Echagaray – León
- (Italy) Fabio Fognini – Turin
- (Russia) (Kazakhstan) Andrey Golubev – Heilbronn
- (Mexico) Santiago González – Belo Horizonte
- (Turkey) Marsel İlhan – Ramat Hasharon
- (France) Adrian Mannarino – Jersey
- (Republic of Ireland) Conor Niland – New Delhi
- (Japan) Kei Nishikori – Bermuda
- (Poland) Dawid Olejniczak – Mexico City
- (France) Josselin Ouanna – Rennes
- (United States) Rajeev Ram – Winnetka
- (France) Laurent Recouderc – Bytom
- (Spain) Pere Riba – Seville
- (Czech Republic) Lukáš Rosol – Košice
- (Italy) Andreas Seppi – Bergamo
- (Republic of Ireland) Louk Sorensen – Wolfsburg
- (Ukraine) Sergiy Stakhovsky – Segovia
- (United States) Ryan Sweeting – Rimouski
- (Romania) Adrian Ungur – Sofia
- (United States) Michael Yani – Yuba City
- (Argentina) Horacio Zeballos – Recanati
- (Slovenia) Grega Žemlja – Cancún

ATP challenger titles won by nation:

- Argentina 18 (Almaty, Asunción, Bogotá, Bordeaux, Buenos Aires, Campos do Jordão, Como, Cremona, Guayaquil, Medellín, Peru, Prostějov, Recanati, Rimini, Rome, San Benedetto, San Luis Potosí, Sanremo)
- France 17 (Besançon, Braunschweig, Bytom, Cherbourg, Cherkassy, Constanţa, Dnipropetrovsk, Graz, Jersey, Marrakech, Miami, Orléans, Poznań, Reggio Emilia, Rennes, Szczecin, Tampere)
- United States 17 (Aptos, Baton Rouge, Bradenton, Calabasas, Carson, Dallas, Knoxville, Louisville, Lubbock, Nashville, Rimouski, Sacramento, Tallahassee, Tulsa, Waco, Winnetka, Yuba City)
- Spain 14 (Aarhus, Brașov, Bucharest, Córdoba, La Serena, Medjugorje, Meknes, Monza, San Sebastián, Seville, Tanger, Tarragona, Trnava, Vigo)
- Russia 11 (Aachen, Barletta, Donetsk, Heilbronn, Helsinki, Karlsruhe, Milan, Mons, Samarkand, Saransk, Telde)
- Italy 10 (Alessandria, Bergamo, Cordenons, Genoa, Naples, Naples, Nouméa, San Marino, Todi, Turin)
- Brazil 8 (Bogotá, Bogotá, Cali, Florianópolis, Rabat, Santiago, São Paulo, Tunis)
- Germany 8 (Alphen, Dresden, Eckental, Freudenstadt, New Delhi, Penza, Sarajevo, Timișoara)
- Belgium 7 (Düsseldorf, Geneva, Grenoble, Moncton, Saint-Brieuc, Wrocław, Zagreb)
- Czech Republic 6 (Bratislava, Bronx, Busan, Košice, Ostrava, Prague)
- Japan 5 (Bermuda, Busan, Kyoto, New Delhi, Toyota City)
- Chile 4 (Aracaju, Binghamton, Florianópolis, Rijeka)
- Chinese Taipei 3 (New Delhi, Tashkent, Waikoloa)
- Croatia 3 (Belgrade, East London, Kolding)
- Netherlands 3 (Athens Scheveningen, Sunrise)
- Peru 3 (Lugano, Salinas, Tunica)
- Australia 2 (Dublin, Montevideo)
- Austria 2 (Cali, Fürth)
- Ecuador 2 (Manta, Quito)
- (Republic of Ireland) Ireland 2 (New Delhi, Wolfsburg)
- Luxembourg 2 (Humacao, İzmir)
- Mexico 2 (Belo Horizonte, León)
- Poland 2 (Mexico City, Oberstaufen)
- Portugal 2 (Istanbul, Sassuolo)
- Romania 2 (Manerbio, Sofia)
- Serbia 2 (Banja Luka, Ljubljana)
- South Korea 2 (Seoul, Yokohama)
- Sweden 2 (Guangzhou, Manchester)
- Switzerland 2 (Lanzarote, Puebla)
- Uzbekistan 2 (Bukhara, Karshi)
- Canada 1 (Surbiton)
- (United Kingdom) Great Britain 1 (Granby)
- India 1 (Lexington)
- Israel 1 (Vancouver)
- Kazakhstan 1 (Astana)
- Morocco 1 (Chiasso)
- Slovenia 1 (Cancún)
- South Africa 1 (Champaign)
- Turkey 1 (Ramat Hasharon)
- Ukraine 1 (Segovia)

== See also ==
- 2008 in tennis
- 2008 WTA Tour
- ATP International Series Gold
- ATP International Series
- 2008 ATP Tour
