= 2010 ZRE Katowice Bytom Open – Singles =

Singles
- 2010 ZRE Katowice Bytom Open

Final
- Champion: (Spain) Pere Riba
- Runner-up: (Argentina) Facundo Bagnis
- Score: 6–0, 6–3

Events
Singles	Doubles
- ZRE Katowice Bytom Open

Laurent Recouderc was the defending champion, but he chose not to compete this year.
Pere Riba won in the final 6–0, 6–3 against Facundo Bagnis.

== Seeds ==
1. (Spain) Pere Riba (champion)
2. (Spain) Óscar Hernández (second round)
3. (Ukraine) Ivan Sergeyev (first round)
4. (Slovakia) Martin Kližan (second round)
5. (Chile) Jorge Aguilar (second round)
6. (Chile) Paul Capdeville (quarterfinals)
7. (Czech Republic) Konstantin Kravchuk (first round)
8. (Hungary) Attila Balázs (first round, retired)

== Draw ==
Key

- Q = Qualifier
- WC = Wild card
- LL = Lucky loser
- Alt = Alternate
- ITF = ITF entry
- PR = Protected ranking
- SR = Special ranking
- SE = Special exempt
- JE = Junior exempt
- JR = Junior Accelerator Programme entrant
- CO = College Accelerator Programme entrant
- NG = Next Gen Accelerator Program entrant
- w/o = Walkover
- r = Retired
- d = Defaulted

=== Finals ===
Semifinals
1	(Spain) Pere Riba	6	5	7
Q	(Czech Republic) Jaroslav Pospíšil	1	7	6^{3}
(Argentina) Facundo Bagnis	6	2	7
(Germany) Matthias Bachinger	2	6	6^{1}

Final
1	(Spain) Pere Riba	6	6
(Argentina) Facundo Bagnis	0	3

=== Top half ===
First round
1	(Spain) P Riba	6	6
(Canada) V Pospisil	3	1
LL	(Spain) P Carreno-Busta	5	2
(Spain) P Santos	7	6
(Latvia) A Juška	7	4	5
(Netherlands) T Schoorel	5	6	7
(Poland) J Janowicz	6^{5}	6	6
7	(Russia) K Kravchuk	7	3	4
3	(Ukraine) I Sergeyev	5	1
Q	(Czech Republic) J Pospíšil	7	6
Q	(Poland) B Koniusz	1	2
Q	(Chile) A García	6	6
(Croatia) N Mektić	7	6
WC	(Slovakia) Marko Daniš	6^{2}	2
(Romania) C Gârd	6	2
8	(Hungary) A Balázs	0	0	r

Second round
1	(Spain) P Riba	6	6
(Spain) P Santos	2	3
(Netherlands) T Schoorel	2	7	6^{1}
(Poland) J Janowicz	6	6^{5}	7
Q	(Czech Republic) J Pospíšil	7	6
Q	(Chile) A García	5	3
(Croatia) N Mektić	4	6	6
(Romania) C Gârd	6	4	0

Quarterfinals
1	(Spain) P Riba	6	7
(Poland) J Janowicz	1	6^{2}
Q	(Czech Republic) J Pospíšil	6	7
(Croatia) N Mektić	4	6^{5}

Semifinals
1	(Spain) P Riba	6	5	7
Q	(Czech Republic) J Pospíšil	1	7	6^{3}

=== Bottom half ===
First round
5	(Chile) J Aguilar	7	6
(Czech Republic) J Mertl	6^{2}	2
WC	(Poland) G Panfil	6^{4}	4
(Romania) M Copil	7	6
(Argentina) J-P Amado	6	3	0
(Argentina) F Bagnis	3	6	6
ALT	(Austria) M Slanar	2	6	6^{4}
4	(Slovakia) M Kližan	6	4	7
6	(Chile) P Capdeville	6^{6}	6	6
WC	(Poland) R Gozdur	7	1	3
Q	(Hungary) A Kellner	3	6	6
WC	(Czech Republic) A Vejmělka	6	3	2
(Germany) M Bachinger	6	6
(Slovakia) I Klec	4	2
(Czech Republic) J Vaněk	6	3	2
2	(Spain) Ó Hernández	2	6	6

Second round
5	(Chile) J Aguilar	3	2
(Romania) M Copil	6	6
(Argentina) F Bagnis	6	6
4	(Slovakia) M Kližan	2	4
6	(Chile) P Capdeville	6	6^{4}	6
Q	(Hungary) A Kellner	4	7	3
(Germany) M Bachinger	6	7
2	(Spain) Ó Hernández	2	5

Quarterfinals
(Romania) M Copil	6^{4}	6^{6}
(Argentina) F Bagnis	7	7
6	(Chile) P Capdeville	2	4
(Germany) M Bachinger	6	6

Semifinals
(Argentina) F Bagnis	6	2	7
(Germany) M Bachinger	2	6	6^{1}
