= 2009 Polska Energia Open – Singles =

Men's tennis tournament

Singles
- 2009 Polska Energia Open

Final
- Champion: (France) Laurent Recouderc
- Runner-up: (Czech Republic) Jan Hájek
- Score: 6–3, 6–4

Events
Singles	Doubles
- Polska Energia Open

Laurent Recouderc was the defending champion and he won this edition too. He defeated 6–3, 6–4 Jan Hájek in the final.

== Seeds ==
1. (France) Josselin Ouanna (first round)
2. (Spain) Rubén Ramírez Hidalgo (semifinals)
3. (Spain) Santiago Ventura (quarterfinals)
4. (France) Laurent Recouderc (champion)
5. (Spain) Pablo Santos (second round)
6. (Czech Republic) Jan Hájek (final)
7. (Serbia) Boris Pašanski (second round)
8. (Spain) Miguel Ángel López Jaén (first round)

== Draw ==
Key

- Q = Qualifier
- WC = Wild card
- LL = Lucky loser
- Alt = Alternate
- ITF = ITF entry
- PR = Protected ranking
- SR = Special ranking
- SE = Special exempt
- JE = Junior exempt
- JR = Junior Accelerator Programme entrant
- CO = College Accelerator Programme entrant
- NG = Next Gen Accelerator Program entrant
- w/o = Walkover
- r = Retired
- d = Defaulted

=== Final four ===
Semifinals
6	(Czech Republic) Jan Hájek	6	6
(Slovakia) Pavol Červenák	2	3
4	(France) Laurent Recouderc	3	6	6
2	(Spain) Rubén Ramírez Hidalgo	6	2	0

Final
6	(Czech Republic) Jan Hájek	3	4
4	(France) Laurent Recouderc	6	6

=== Top half ===
First round
1	(France) J Ouanna	3	6	2
(Spain) G Olaso	6	3	6
(Ukraine) I Sergeyev	4	4
(Poland) J Janowicz	6	6
(Poland) G Panfil	6	6
(Hungary) A Balázs	3	2
(Belgium) Y Mertens	4	6	4
6	(Czech Republic) J Hájek	6	3	6
3	(Spain) S Ventura	6	6
(Spain) G Trujillo-Soler	3	3
(Italy) A Arnaboldi	6^{6}	3
Q	(Ukraine) A Smirnov	7	6
(Slovakia) M Semjan	2	3
(Slovakia) P Červenák	6	6
WC	(Poland) B Szumański	5	6^{4}
5	(Spain) P Santos	7	7

Second round
(Spain) G Olaso	6^{5}	4
(Poland) J Janowicz	7	6
(Poland) G Panfil	2	6	0
6	(Czech Republic) J Hájek	6	3	6
3	(Spain) S Ventura	7	6
Q	(Ukraine) A Smirnov	6^{2}	1
(Slovakia) P Červenák	6	6
5	(Spain) P Santos	3	3

Quarterfinals
(Poland) J Janowicz	2	3
6	(Czech Republic) J Hájek	6	6
3	(Spain) S Ventura	4	6	1
(Slovakia) P Červenák	6	3	6

Semifinals
6	(Czech Republic) J Hájek	6	6
(Slovakia) P Červenák	2	3

=== Bottom half ===
First round
7	(Serbia) B Pašanski	6	6
WC	(Poland) M Przysiężny	3	0
Q	(Canada) V Pospisil	3	1
Q	(France) G Rufin	6	6
(Poland) M Gawron	6^{2}	6	6
(Japan) J Mitsuhashi	7	2	2
(Czech Republic) J Minář	3	4
4	(France) L Recouderc	6	6
8	(Spain) MÁ López Jaén	1	3
(Spain) G Alcaide	6	6
Q	(Argentina) N Todero	6	6
WC	(Poland) M Kowalczyk	2	2
(France) J Dasnières de Veigy	6	6
WC	(Poland) M Szmigiel	1	3
(Romania) T-D Crăciun	3	0
2	(Spain) R Ramírez Hidalgo	6	6

Second round
7	(Serbia) B Pašanski	3	2
Q	(France) G Rufin	6	6
(Poland) M Gawron	1	0
4	(France) L Recouderc	6	6
(Spain) G Alcaide	5	3
Q	(Argentina) N Todero	7	6
(France) J Dasnières de Veigy	0	7	2
2	(Spain) R Ramírez Hidalgo	6	6^{3}	6

Quarterfinals
Q	(France) G Rufin	6	4	6^{5}
4	(France) L Recouderc	3	6	7
Q	(Argentina) N Todero	4	4
2	(Spain) R Ramírez Hidalgo	6	6

Semifinals
4	(France) L Recouderc	3	6	6
2	(Spain) R Ramírez Hidalgo	6	2	0
