= 2009 Polska Energia Open – Doubles =

Doubles
- 2009 Polska Energia Open

Final
- Champions: (Spain) Pablo Santos (Spain) Gabriel Trujillo-Soler
- Runners-up: (Czech Republic) Jan Hájek (Czech Republic) Dušan Karol
- Score: 6–3, 7–6(3)

Events
Singles	Doubles
- Polska Energia Open

Marcin Gawron and Mateusz Kowalczyk were the defenders of title, but they chose to not compete together.
Gawron partnered up with Jerzy Janowicz. However, they lost to Jan Hájek and Dušan Karol in the first round.
Kowalczyk played with Grzegorz Panfil, but they were eliminated by Rubén Ramírez Hidalgo and Santiago Ventura in the quarterfinals.
Pablo Santos and Gabriel Trujillo-Soler became the new champions, after their won 6–3, 7–6(3), against Hájek and Karol in the final.

== Seeds ==
1. (Spain) Rubén Ramírez Hidalgo / (Spain) Santiago Ventura (semifinals)
2. (Poland) Tomasz Bednarek / (United States) Jim Thomas (semifinals)
3. (Spain) Pablo Santos / (Spain) Gabriel Trujillo-Soler (champions)
4. (Czech Republic) Jan Hájek / (Czech Republic) Dušan Karol (final)

== Draw ==
Key

- Q = Qualifier
- WC = Wild card
- LL = Lucky loser
- Alt = Alternate
- ITF = ITF entry
- PR = Protected ranking
- SR = Special ranking
- SE = Special exempt
- JE = Junior exempt
- JR = Junior Accelerator Programme entrant
- CO = College Accelerator Programme entrant
- NG = Next Gen Accelerator Program entrant
- w/o = Walkover
- r = Retired
- d = Defaulted

=== Draw ===
First round
1	(Spain) R Ramírez Hidalgo (Spain) S Ventura	7	4	[10]
(Hungary) A Balázs (Israel) A Hadad	5	6	[3]
(United States) R Rizza (United States) K Van't Hof	4	4
(Poland) M Kowalczyk (Poland) G Panfil	6	6
3	(Spain) P Santos (Spain) G Trujillo-Soler	6	6
(Ukraine) I Sergeyev (Ukraine) A Smirnov	3	3
ALT	(Romania) T-D Crăciun (United States) B Ross	7	3	[4]
WC	(Poland) B Koniusz (Poland) M Szmigiel	6^{7}	6	[10]
WC	(Poland) A Kapas (Poland) B Szumański	6	7
(Spain) G Alcaide (Spain) G Olaso	3	6^{0}
WC	(Poland) M Gawron (Poland) J Janowicz	4	3
4	(Czech Republic) J Hájek (Czech Republic) D Karol	6	6
(Canada) V Pospisil (Canada) A Shamasdin	6	6
(Chile) A García (Serbia) B Pašanski	1	4
(Spain) MÁ López Jaén (Argentina) N Todero	5	2
2	(Poland) T Bednarek (United States) J Thomas	7	6

Quarterfinals
1	(Spain) R Ramírez Hidalgo (Spain) S Ventura	7	2	[10]
(Poland) M Kowalczyk (Poland) G Panfil	6^{5}	6	[6]
3	(Spain) P Santos (Spain) G Trujillo-Soler	6	7
WC	(Poland) B Koniusz (Poland) M Szmigiel	1	6^{5}
WC	(Poland) A Kapas (Poland) B Szumański	6^{4}	0
4	(Czech Republic) J Hájek (Czech Republic) D Karol	7	6
(Canada) V Pospisil (Canada) A Shamasdin	4	6^{5}
2	(Poland) T Bednarek (United States) J Thomas	6	7

Semifinals
1	(Spain) R Ramírez Hidalgo (Spain) S Ventura	3	6^{2}
3	(Spain) P Santos (Spain) G Trujillo-Soler	6	7
4	(Czech Republic) J Hájek (Czech Republic) D Karol	6	4	[13]
2	(Poland) T Bednarek (United States) J Thomas	4	6	[11]

Finals
3	(Spain) P Santos (Spain) G Trujillo-Soler	6	7
4	(Czech Republic) J Hájek (Czech Republic) D Karol	3	6^{3}
