= 2011 Beijing International Challenger – Men's singles =

Men's singles
- 2011 Beijing International Challenger

Final
- Champion: (Uzbekistan) Farrukh Dustov
- Runner-up: (Chinese Taipei) Yang Tsung-hua
- Score: 6–1, 7–6^{(7–4)}

Events
Singles	men	women
Doubles	men	women
← 2010 ·	Beijing International Challenger	· 2012 →

Franko Škugor was the defending champion but decided not to participate.

Farrukh Dustov won against Yang Tsung-hua in the final (6–1, 7–6^{(7–4)}) and win the title.

== Seeds ==
1. (Israel) Dudi Sela (semifinals)
2. (Japan) Go Soeda (second round)
3. (Spain) Guillermo Olaso (quarterfinals)
4. (Israel) Amir Weintraub (first round)
5. (Thailand) Danai Udomchoke (second round)
6. (France) Guillaume Rufin (second round, withdrew)
7. (Russia) Denis Matsukevich (first round)
8. (Slovakia) Marek Semjan (first round)

== Draw ==
=== Key ===
- Q = Qualifier
- WC = Wild card
- LL = Lucky loser
- Alt = Alternate
- SE = Special exempt
- PR = Protected ranking
- ITF = ITF entry
- JE = Junior exempt
- w/o = Walkover
- r = Retired
- d = Defaulted
- SR = Special ranking

=== Finals ===
Semifinals
1	(Israel) Dudi Sela	1	6	4
(Uzbekistan) Farrukh Dustov	6	4	6
(Chinese Taipei) Yang Tsung-hua	6	6
Q	(South Korea) Lim Yong-kyu	4	4

Final
(Uzbekistan) Farrukh Dustov	6	7^{7}
(Chinese Taipei) Yang Tsung-hua	1	6^{4}

=== Top half ===
First round
1	(Israel) D Sela	6	4
(Russia) A Kumantsov	3	1^{r}
(China) D Wu	6	6
WC	(China) Chang Yu	1	2
(Spain) I Cervantes-Huegun	7^{7}	6
(China) Z Zhang	6^{4}	2
(Japan) H Kondo	6^{6}	1
5	(Thailand) D Udomchoke	7^{8}	6
3	(Spain) G Olaso	6	7
WC	(China) Ma Yanan	3	5
Q	(Japan) Junn Mitsuhashi	4	4
WC	(South Korea) W-s Jun	6	6
WC	(China) Z Li	5	6	6
(United States) N Monroe	7	4	3
(Uzbekistan) F Dustov	6	6
7	(Russia) D Matsukevich	2	4

Second round
1	(Israel) D Sela	6	6
(China) D Wu	2	2
(Spain) I Cervantes-Huegun	6	6
5	(Thailand) D Udomchoke	2	3
3	(Spain) G Olaso	7^{7}	6
WC	(South Korea) W-s Jun	6^{5}	1
WC	(China) Z Li	6	6^{5}	6^{4}
(Uzbekistan) F Dustov	3	7^{7}	7^{7}

Quarterfinals
1	(Israel) D Sela	3	7^{8}	6
(Spain) I Cervantes-Huegun	6	6^{6}	2
3	(Spain) G Olaso	1	7^{7}	4
(Uzbekistan) F Dustov	6	6^{4}	6

Semifinals
1	(Israel) D Sela	1	6	4
(Uzbekistan) F Dustov	6	4	6

=== Bottom half ===
First round
6	(France) G Rufin	6	7^{7}
(France) J Ouanna	3	6^{2}
(Chinese Taipei) T-h Yang	5	6	6
(Finland) H Heliövaara	7	3	4
(Chinese Taipei) T Chen	6	6
(Sweden) M Ryderstedt	4	4
(China) M Gong	6	4	7^{7}
4	(Israel) A Weintraub	4	6	6^{4}
8	(Slovakia) M Semjan	3	6^{5}
Q	(South Korea) Y-k Lim	6	7^{7}
Q	(Austria) N Moser	5	6	2
(Japan) Hiroki Moriya	7	4	6
(South Africa) R Klaasen	6^{4}	6	6^{4}
Q	(Slovakia) K Čapkovič	7^{7}	2	7^{7}
(United States) K Kim	2	6	4
2	(Japan) G Soeda	6	3	6

Second round
6	(France) G Rufin
(Chinese Taipei) T-h Yang	w/o
(Chinese Taipei) T Chen	7	6
(China) M Gong	5	3
Q	(South Korea) Y-k Lim	6	6
(Japan) Hiroki Moriya	3	4
Q	(Slovakia) K Čapkovič	6	6
2	(Japan) G Soeda	3	3

Quarterfinals
(Chinese Taipei) T-h Yang	6	7^{7}
(Chinese Taipei) T Chen	4	6^{0}
Q	(South Korea) Y-k Lim	4	6	6
Q	(Slovakia) K Čapkovič	6	1	2

Semifinals
(Chinese Taipei) T-h Yang	6	6
Q	(South Korea) Y-k Lim	4	4
