= 2009 Polska Energia Open =

- Date: June 15 – June 21
- Edition: 4th
- Location: Bytom, Poland

Champions

Singles
- (France) Laurent Recouderc

Doubles
- (Spain) Pablo Santos / (Spain) Gabriel Trujillo Soler
- Polska Energia Open

The 2009 Polska Energia Open was a professional tennis tournament played on outdoor red clay courts. It was part of the 2009 ATP Challenger Tour. It took place in Bytom, Poland between 15 and 21 June 2009.

== Singles entrants ==
=== Seeds ===
Nationality	Player	Ranking*	Seeding
FRA	Josselin Ouanna	120	1
ESP	Rubén Ramírez Hidalgo	123	2
ESP	Santiago Ventura	127	3
FRA	Laurent Recouderc	142	4
ESP	Pablo Santos	181	5
CZE	Jan Hájek	201	6
SRB	Boris Pašanski	213	7
ESP	Miguel Ángel López Jaén	214	8

- Rankings are as of May 25, 2009.

=== Other entrants ===
The following players received wildcards into the singles main draw:

- (Poland) Mateusz Kowalczyk
- (Poland) Michał Przysiężny
- (Poland) Mateusz Szmigiel
- (Poland) Bojan Szumański

The following players received entry from the qualifying draw:

- (Canada) Vasek Pospisil
- (France) Guillaume Rufin
- (Ukraine) Artem Smirnov
- (Argentina) Nicolás Todero

== Champions ==
=== Singles ===
(France) Laurent Recouderc def. (Czech Republic) Jan Hájek, 6–3, 6–4

=== Doubles ===
(Spain) Pablo Santos / (Spain) Gabriel Trujillo Soler def. (Czech Republic) Jan Hájek / (Czech Republic) Dušan Karol, 6–3, 7–6(3)
