= 2009 Internazionali di Tennis dell'Umbria – Doubles =

Doubles
- 2009 Internazionali di Tennis dell'Umbria

Final
- Champions: (Austria) Martin Fischer (Austria) Philipp Oswald
- Runners-up: (Spain) Pablo Santos (Spain) Gabriel Trujillo-Soler
- Score: 7–5, 6–3

Events
Singles	Doubles
← 2008 ·	Internazionali di Tennis dell'Umbria	· 2010 →

Gianluca Naso and Walter Trusendi were the defending champions, but only Trusendi chose to compete this year.
He partnered with Thomas Fabbiano. They reached to the quarterfinals, where he lost to Kevin Anderson and Harsh Mankad.
Martin Fischer and Philipp Oswald defeated Pablo Santos and Gabriel Trujillo-Soler 7–5, 6–3 in the final.

== Seeds ==
1. (Italy) Flavio Cipolla / (Spain) David Marrero (first round)
2. (South Africa) Kevin Anderson / (India) Harsh Mankad (semifinals)
3. (Germany) Simon Greul / (Italy) Alessandro Motti (semifinals)
4. (Brazil) Rogério Dutra da Silva / (Serbia) Boris Pašanski (quarterfinals)

== Draw ==
=== Key ===
- Q = Qualifier
- WC = Wild card
- LL = Lucky loser
- Alt = Alternate
- SE = Special exempt
- PR = Protected ranking
- ITF = ITF entry
- JE = Junior exempt
- w/o = Walkover
- r = Retired
- d = Defaulted
- SR = Special ranking

=== Draw ===
First round
1	(Italy) F Cipolla (Spain) D Marrero	4	6	[4]
(Italy) A Brizzi (Italy) T Tenconi	6	1	[10]
(Spain) P Santos (Spain) G Trujillo-Soler	6	6
(Czech Republic) J Krkoška (India) P Raja	4	3
3	(Germany) S Greul (Italy) A Motti	6	6
WC	(Italy) A Comporto (Italy) E Fioravante	3	2
WC	(Italy) S Galvani (Italy) L Vanni	6	6
(Italy) F Aldi (Italy) A di Mauro	1	4
(Italy) P Lorenzi (Italy) G Petrazzuolo	6	4	[4]
(Austria) M Fischer (Austria) P Oswald	3	6	[10]
(Spain) I Cervantes-Huegun (Spain) G Olaso	1	4
4	(Brazil) R Dutra da Silva (Serbia) B Pašanski	6	6
WC	(Italy) T Fabbiano (Italy) W Trusendi	6	6
(Switzerland) Y Allegro (Bulgaria) G Dimitrov	4	0
(United States) B Battistone (United States) D Battistone	3	2
2	(South Africa) K Anderson (India) H Mankad	6	6

Quarterfinals
(Italy) A Brizzi (Italy) T Tenconi	2	6	[7]
(Spain) P Santos (Spain) G Trujillo-Soler	6	4	[10]
3	(Germany) S Greul (Italy) A Motti	6	6
WC	(Italy) S Galvani (Italy) L Vanni	4	2
(Austria) M Fischer (Austria) P Oswald	7	6
4	(Brazil) R Dutra da Silva (Serbia) B Pašanski	6^{4}	3
WC	(Italy) T Fabbiano (Italy) W Trusendi	6	5	[7]
2	(South Africa) K Anderson (India) H Mankad	4	7	[10]

Semifinals
(Spain) P Santos (Spain) G Trujillo-Soler	6	6
3	(Germany) S Greul (Italy) A Motti	4	3
(Austria) M Fischer (Austria) P Oswald	6	3	[10]
2	(South Africa) K Anderson (India) H Mankad	3	6	[7]

Finals
(Spain) P Santos (Spain) G Trujillo-Soler	5	3
(Austria) M Fischer (Austria) P Oswald	7	6
