= 2010 ZRE Katowice Bytom Open – Doubles =

Doubles
- 2010 ZRE Katowice Bytom Open

Final
- Champions: (Slovakia) Ivo Klec (Ukraine) Artem Smirnov
- Runners-up: (Russia) Konstantin Kravchuk (Ukraine) Ivan Sergeyev
- Score: 1–6, 6–3, [10–3]

Events
Singles	Doubles
- ZRE Katowice Bytom Open

Pablo Santos and Gabriel Trujillo Soler were the defending champions. Trujillo Soler chose to not play this year.
Santos partnered up with Paul Capdeville, but they were eliminated by Konstantin Kravchuk and Ivan Sergeyev.
Ivo Klec and Artem Smirnov won in the final 1–6, 6–3, [10–3] against Kravchuk and Sergeyev.

== Seeds ==
1. (Latvia) Andis Juška / (Latvia) Deniss Pavlovs (quarterfinals)
2. (Czech Republic) Jan Mertl / (Austria) Martin Slanar (quarterfinals)
3. (Czech Republic) Jaroslav Pospíšil / (Canada) Vasek Pospisil (quarterfinals)
4. (Argentina) Juan-Pablo Amado / (Argentina) Facundo Bagnis (first round)

== Main draw ==
Key

- Q = Qualifier
- WC = Wild card
- LL = Lucky loser
- Alt = Alternate
- ITF = ITF entry
- PR = Protected ranking
- SR = Special ranking
- SE = Special exempt
- JE = Junior exempt
- JR = Junior Accelerator Programme entrant
- CO = College Accelerator Programme entrant
- NG = Next Gen Accelerator Program entrant
- w/o = Walkover
- r = Retired
- d = Defaulted

=== Draw ===
First round
1	(Latvia) A Juška (Latvia) D Pavlovs	7	6
(Hungary) A Balázs (Russia) D Matsukevich	6^{1}	2
(Romania) M Copil (Romania) C Gârd	4	6	[5]
(Slovakia) I Klec (Ukraine) A Smirnov	6	3	[10]
3	(Czech Republic) J Pospíšil (Canada) V Pospisil	7	6
(Egypt) K Maamoun (Egypt) S Sabry	5	2
WC	(Poland) A Kapaś (Poland) Mateusz Szmigiel	6	0	[5]
WC	(Croatia) N Mektić (Croatia) I Zovko	3	6	[10]
(Russia) K Kravchuk (Ukraine) I Sergeyev	7	4	[10]
(Spain) P Carreño Busta (Spain) P Riba	6^{3}	6	[1]
(Chile) J Aguilar (Chile) A García	6	6^{3}	[11]
4	(Argentina) Juan-Pablo Amado (Argentina) F Bagnis	2	7	[9]
(Chile) P Capdeville (Spain) P Santos	6	6
(Spain) Ó Hernández (Spain) A Vivanco-Guzmán	3	4
WC	(Poland) B Koniusz (Poland) G Panfil	3	7	[7]
2	(Czech Republic) J Mertl (Austria) M Slanar	6	6^{5}	[10]

Quarterfinals
1	(Latvia) A Juška (Latvia) D Pavlovs	3	4
(Slovakia) I Klec (Ukraine) A Smirnov	6	6
3	(Czech Republic) J Pospíšil (Canada) V Pospisil	6^{4}	6	[7]
WC	(Croatia) N Mektić (Croatia) I Zovko	7	2	[10]
(Russia) K Kravchuk (Ukraine) I Sergeyev	6	6
(Chile) J Aguilar (Chile) A García	1	1
(Chile) P Capdeville (Spain) P Santos	6	3	[10]
2	(Czech Republic) J Mertl (Austria) M Slanar	4	6	[7]

Semifinals
(Slovakia) I Klec (Ukraine) A Smirnov	7	7
WC	(Croatia) N Mektić (Croatia) I Zovko	5	5
(Russia) K Kravchuk (Ukraine) I Sergeyev	6	6
(Chile) P Capdeville (Spain) P Santos	2	1

Finals
(Slovakia) I Klec (Ukraine) A Smirnov	1	6	[10]
(Russia) K Kravchuk (Ukraine) I Sergeyev	6	3	[3]
