= 2010 Beijing International Challenger – Men's doubles =

Men's doubles
- 2010 Beijing International Challenger

Final
- Champions: (Canada) Pierre-Ludovic Duclos (Russia) Artem Sitak
- Runners-up: (Australia) Sadik Kadir (India) Purav Raja
- Score: 7–6(4), 7–6(5)

Events
Singles	men	women
Doubles	men	women
Beijing International Challenger	· 2011 →

Pierre-Ludovic Duclos and Artem Sitak defeated Sadik Kadir and Purav Raja 7–6(4), 7–6(5) in the final.

== Seeds ==
1. (Australia) Sadik Kadir / (India) Purav Raja (final)
2. (Canada) Pierre-Ludovic Duclos / (Russia) Artem Sitak (champions)
3. (Australia) Kaden Hensel / (Australia) Dane Propoggia (semifinals)
4. (Chinese Taipei) Lee Hsin-han / (Chinese Taipei) Yang Tsung-hua (quarterfinals)

== Draw ==
=== Key ===
- Q = Qualifier
- WC = Wild card
- LL = Lucky loser
- Alt = Alternate
- SE = Special exempt
- PR = Protected ranking
- ITF = ITF entry
- JE = Junior exempt
- w/o = Walkover
- r = Retired
- d = Defaulted
- SR = Special ranking

=== Draw ===
First round
1	(Australia) S Kadir (India) P Raja	6	6
(India) P Amritraj (New Zealand) J Statham	1	1
(Lithuania) L Grigelis (Croatia) F Škugor	5	3
(Finland) H Heliövaara (South Korea) W-s Jun	7	6
4	(Chinese Taipei) H-h Lee (Chinese Taipei) T-h Yang	6	6
WC	(China) P Gao (China) W Gao	2	4
(China) D Wu (China) Z Zhang	2	6	[8]
(Japan) Y Ito (Israel) A Weintraub	6	1	[10]
(Brazil) T Fernandes (Chinese Taipei) C-h Yi	6	6^{2}	[10]
(Russia) A Kumantsov (Austria) N Moser	2	7	[3]
WC	(China) B Ouyang (China) C Wang	0	4
3	(Australia) K Hensel (Australia) D Propoggia	6	6
(Japan) H Kondo (Ukraine) D Molchanov	3	4
(China) M-X Gong (China) Z Li	6	6
WC	(China) Y Bai (China) Y Chang	5	3
2	(Canada) P-L Duclos (Russia) A Sitak	7	6

Quarterfinals
1	(Australia) S Kadir (India) P Raja	6	6
(Finland) H Heliövaara (South Korea) W-s Jun	4	1
4	(Chinese Taipei) H-h Lee (Chinese Taipei) T-h Yang	7	6^{1}	[6]
(Japan) Y Ito (Israel) A Weintraub	5	7	[10]
(Brazil) T Fernandes (Chinese Taipei) C-h Yi	1	7	[6]
3	(Australia) K Hensel (Australia) D Propoggia	6	6^{2}	[10]
(China) M-X Gong (China) Z Li	2	5
2	(Canada) P-L Duclos (Russia) A Sitak	6	7

Semifinals
1	(Australia) S Kadir (India) P Raja	7	1	[12]
(Japan) Y Ito (Israel) A Weintraub	5	6	[10]
3	(Australia) K Hensel (Australia) D Propoggia	4	2
2	(Canada) P-L Duclos (Russia) A Sitak	6	6

Finals
1	(Australia) S Kadir (India) P Raja	6^{4}	6^{5}
2	(Canada) P-L Duclos (Russia) A Sitak	7	7
