= 2015 Fuzhou Open =

Beach volleyball tournament

The 2015 Fuzhou Open was a men's and women's beach volleyball tournament played between 21 and 26 April 2015 in Fuzhou, China. The event is part of the 2015 FIVB Beach Volleyball World Tour.

== Men's tournament ==
=== Qualification ===
==== Round 1 ====
Date	Time		Score		Set 1	Set 2	Set 3	Total	Report
21 Apr		Pedlow–O'Gorman (Canada)	Bye						
21 Apr	09:50	Pļaviņš–Egleskalns (Latvia)	2–0	(Spain) Tomás–Menéndez	21–15	21–18		42–33	
21 April	11:30	Ha–Bao (China)	1–2	(Australia) Durant–Grice	21–16	19–21	12–15	52–52	
21 April	11:30	Watson–O'Dea (New Zealand)	2–1	(Austria) Kunert–Dressler	15–21	21–17	15–13	51–51	
21 April	10:40	Montgomery–Casebeer (United States)	0–2	(Poland) Popek–Pelka	20–22	19–21		39–43	
21 Apr	10:40	Barsouk–Koshkarev (Russia)	2–0	(Czech Republic) Kubala–Hadrava	21–16	21–18		42–34	
21 Apr	09:50	de Paula–Moreira (Brazil)	2–0	(Qatar) Jefferson–Cherif	21–17	21–15		42–32	
21 Apr	09:50	Kopp–Grabovskyy (Canada)	0–2	(Czech Republic) Dumek–Kufa	18–21	19–21		37–42	
21 Apr	10:40	Solovejs–Sorokins (Latvia)	1–2	(China) Gao–Li	21–14	24–26	12–15	57–55	
21 Apr	10:40	Romano–Gritsai (Azerbaijan)	1–2	(Switzerland) Chevallier–Krattiger	12–21	31–29	13–15	56–65	
21 Apr	09:00	Mermer–Şekerci (Turkey)	2–0	(United States) McColloch–Lorenz	21–18	21–18		42–36	
21 Apr	09:00	Takahashi–Hasegawa (Japan)	2–0	(Venezuela) Charly–Leon	21–18	21–14		42–32	
21 Apr	09:00	Wheelan–Plantinga (Canada)	1–2	(Iran) Salemi–Raoufi	21–15	17–21	11–15	49–51	
21 Apr	09:00	Santos–Rudykh (Azerbaijan)	0–2	(Switzerland) Kovatsch–Kissling	14–21	16–21		30–42	
21 Apr	09:50	Stoyanovskiy–Yarzutkin (Russia)	2–0	(Australia) Court–Schumann	21–13	21–18		42–31	
21 Apr			Bye	(Israel) Faiga–Hilman					

==== Round 2 ====
Date	Time		Score		Set 1	Set 2	Set 3	Total	Report
21 Apr	15:30	Pedlow–O'Gorman (Canada)	1–2	(Latvia) Pļaviņš–Egleskalns	22–20	15–21	13–15	50–56	
21 Apr	15:30	Durant–Grice (Australia)	2–1	(New Zealand) Watson–O'Dea	19–21	21–19	15–12	55–52	
21 Apr	14:40	Popek–Pelka (Poland)	0–2	(Russia) Barsouk–Koshkarev	9–21	17–21		26–42	
21 Apr	13:50	de Paula–Moreira (Brazil)	2–0	(Czech Republic) Dumek–Kufa	29–27	21–19		50–46	
21 Apr	14:40	Gao–Li (China)	2–1	(Switzerland) Chevallier–Krattiger	19–21	21–19	21–19	61–59	
21 Apr	13:00	Mermer–Şekerci (Turkey)	0–2	(Japan) Takahashi–Hasegawa	16–21	17–21		33–42	
21 Apr	13:00	Salemi–Raoufi (Iran)	1–2	(Switzerland) Kovatsch–Kissling	16–21	26–24	11–15	53–60	
21 Apr	13:50	Stoyanovskiy–Yarzutkin (Russia)	0–2	(Israel) Faiga–Hilman	16–21	21–23		37–44	

=== Main Draw ===
==== Pool A ====
Pos	Team	Pld	W	L	Pts	SW	SL	SR	SPW	SPL	SPR
1	(Netherlands) Nummerdor–Varenhorst	3	3	0	6	6	0	MAX	130	109	1.193
2	(Italy) Ingrosso–Ingrosso	3	2	1	5	4	2	2.000	124	106	1.170
3	(Venezuela) Fañe–Jackson	3	1	2	4	2	4	0.500	107	113	0.947
4	(China) Gao–Li	3	0	3	3	0	6	0.000	93	126	0.738

==== Pool B ====
Pos	Team	Pld	W	L	Pts	SW	SL	SR	SPW	SPL	SPR
1	(Russia) Semenov–Krasilnikov	3	3	0	6	6	0	MAX	126	96	1.313
2	(Norway) Horrem–Eithun	3	2	1	5	4	4	1.000	157	163	0.963
3	(United States) Rogers–Slick	3	1	2	4	3	4	0.750	138	141	0.979
4	(Japan) Takahashi–Hasegawa	3	0	3	3	1	6	0.167	128	149	0.859

==== Pool C ====
Pos	Team	Pld	W	L	Pts	SW	SL	SR	SPW	SPL	SPR
1	(United States) Lucena–Brunner	3	3	0	6	6	0	MAX	126	89	1.416
2	(Australia) Durant–Grice	3	2	1	5	4	3	1.333	124	132	0.939
3	(Greece) Kotsilianos–Zoupanis	3	1	2	4	3	4	0.750	126	128	0.984
4	(Germany) Poniewaz–Poniewaz	3	0	3	3	0	6	0.000	99	126	0.786

==== Pool D ====
Pos	Team	Pld	W	L	Pts	SW	SL	SR	SPW	SPL	SPR
1	(Germany) Böckermann–Flüggen	3	3	0	6	6	1	6.000	136	121	1.124
2	(Russia) Barsouk–Koshkarev	3	2	1	5	5	2	2.500	139	125	1.112
3	(Canada) Binstock–Schachter	3	1	2	4	2	4	0.500	111	115	0.965
4	(Austria) Winter–Petutschnig	3	0	3	3	0	6	0.000	102	127	0.803

==== Pool E ====
Pos	Team	Pld	W	L	Pts	SW	SL	SR	SPW	SPL	SPR
1	(Germany) Fuchs–Kaczmarek	3	3	0	6	6	0	MAX	127	97	1.309
2	(Poland) Kosiak–Rudol	3	1	2	4	2	4	0.500	117	121	0.967
3	(Latvia) Pļaviņš–Egleskalns	3	1	2	4	2	4	0.500	111	122	0.910
4	(Australia) Kapa–McHugh	3	1	2	4	2	4	0.500	109	124	0.879

==== Pool F ====
Pos	Team	Pld	W	L	Pts	SW	SL	SR	SPW	SPL	SPR
1	(Netherlands) Brouwer–Meeuwsen	3	3	0	6	6	1	6.000	136	108	1.259
2	(Israel) Faiga–Hilman	3	2	1	5	4	4	1.000	142	146	0.973
3	(Mexico) Virgen–Ontiveros	3	1	2	4	4	4	1.000	145	141	1.028
4	(China) Li Zhuoxin–Zhang Lizeng	3	0	3	3	1	6	0.167	107	135	0.793

==== Pool G ====
Pos	Team	Pld	W	L	Pts	SW	SL	SR	SPW	SPL	SPR
1	(Brazil) de Paula–Moreira	3	2	1	5	4	3	1.333	130	124	1.048
2	(Poland) Kantor–Losiak	3	2	1	5	5	3	1.667	153	143	1.070
3	(Chile) Grimalt–Grimalt	3	1	2	4	2	4	0.500	107	115	0.930
4	(China) Cheng Chen–Yang Cong	3	1	2	4	3	4	0.750	130	138	0.942

==== Pool H ====
Pos	Team	Pld	W	L	Pts	SW	SL	SR	SPW	SPL	SPR
1	(Poland) Bryl–Kujawiak	3	3	0	6	6	0	MAX	128	102	1.255
2	(Switzerland) Kovatsch–Kissling	3	2	1	5	4	2	2.000	122	110	1.109
3	(France) Krou–Rowlandson	3	1	2	4	2	4	0.500	106	118	0.898
4	(China) Wu–Li	3	0	3	3	0	6	0.000	103	129	0.798
