= 2009 Internazionali di Tennis dell'Umbria – Singles =

Singles
- 2009 Internazionali di Tennis dell'Umbria

Final
- Champion: (Germany) Simon Greul
- Runner-up: (Romania) Adrian Ungur
- Score: 2–6, 6–1, 7–6(6)

Events
Singles	Doubles
← 2008 ·	Internazionali di Tennis dell'Umbria	· 2010 →

Tomas Tenconi was the defending champion; however, he was eliminated by Andrea Arnabold in the second round.
Simon Greul won in the final 2–6, 6–1, 7–6(6), against Adrian Ungur.

== Seeds ==
1. (Germany) Simon Greul (champion)
2. (Italy) Flavio Cipolla (first round)
3. (Italy) Paolo Lorenzi (quarterfinals)
4. (South Africa) Kevin Anderson (quarterfinals)
5. (France) Édouard Roger-Vasselin (quarterfinals)
6. (Italy) Tomas Tenconi (second round)
7. (Austria) Martin Fischer (first round)
8. (Spain) Pablo Andújar (first round)

== Draw ==
=== Key ===
- Q = Qualifier
- WC = Wild card
- LL = Lucky loser
- Alt = Alternate
- SE = Special exempt
- PR = Protected ranking
- ITF = ITF entry
- JE = Junior exempt
- w/o = Walkover
- r = Retired
- d = Defaulted
- SR = Special ranking

=== Final four ===
Semifinals
1	(Germany) Simon Greul	6	6
Q	(Belgium) David Goffin	3	3
Q	(Romania) Adrian Ungur	6	6
WC	(Italy) Andrea Arnaboldi	3	2

Final
1	(Germany) Simon Greul	2	6	7
Q	(Romania) Adrian Ungur	6	1	6^{6}

=== Top half ===
First round
1	(Germany) S Greul	6	6
Q	(Serbia) B Pašanski	2	3
(Argentina) J-M Aranguren	6	1	2
WC	(Italy) G Petrazzuolo	2	6	6
LL	(Italy) T Fabbiano	6	2	2
(Italy) A di Mauro	4	6	6
(Brazil) R Dutra da Silva	3	3
5	(France) É Roger-Vasselin	6	6
4	(South Africa) K Anderson	6	6
(Bulgaria) G Dimitrov	3	4
(Italy) Enzo Burzi	6	7
WC	(Italy) F Aldi	4	6^{0}
WC	(Italy) S Galvani	2	6	1
(Italy) A Brizzi	6	2	6
Q	(Belgium) D Goffin	6	6
7	(Austria) M Fischer	4	4

Second round
1	(Germany) S Greul	6	6
WC	(Italy) G Petrazzuolo	4	2
(Italy) A di Mauro	0	r
5	(France) É Roger-Vasselin	4
4	(South Africa) K Anderson	6	6
(Italy) E Burzi	3	1
(Italy) A Brizzi	1	7	3
Q	(Belgium) D Goffin	6	5	6

Quarterfinals
1	(Germany) S Greul	6	6
5	(France) É Roger-Vasselin	3	2
4	(South Africa) K Anderson	5	3
Q	(Belgium) D Goffin	7	6

Semifinals
1	(Germany) S Greul	6	6
Q	(Belgium) D Goffin	3	3

=== Bottom half ===
First round
8	(Spain) P Andújar	4	2
Q	(Romania) A Ungur	6	6
(Spain) J Checa-Calvo	0	2	r
(France) J Dasnières de Veigy	6	4
Q	(Russia) A Kuznetsov	1	1
SE	(Argentina) C Berlocq	6	6
(Spain) P Santos	4	6	4
3	(Italy) P Lorenzi	6	3	6
6	(Italy) T Tenconi	6	6
(Spain) G Olaso	3	1
WC	(Italy) Andrea Arnaboldi	6	6
(Japan) Y Sugita	4	3
(Spain) I Cervantes-Huegun	6^{2}	2
(Spain) D Marrero	7	6
(Austria) P Oswald	7	6
2	(Italy) F Cipolla	6^{8}	2

Second round
Q	(Romania) A Ungur	7	2	6
(France) J Dasnières de Veigy	6^{4}	6	3
SE	(Argentina) C Berlocq	3	6	5
3	(Italy) P Lorenzi	6	1	7
6	(Italy) T Tenconi	4	5
WC	(Italy) A Arnaboldi	6	7
(Spain) D Marrero	7	6
(Austria) P Oswald	5	4

Quarterfinals
Q	(Romania) A Ungur	6	6
3	(Italy) P Lorenzi	4	0
WC	(Italy) A Arnaboldi	7	6
(Spain) D Marrero	6^{3}	0

Semifinals
Q	(Romania) A Ungur	6	6
WC	(Italy) A Arnaboldi	3	2
