= 2011 Beijing International Challenger – Men's doubles =

Men's doubles
- 2011 Beijing International Challenger

Final
- Champions: (Thailand) Sanchai Ratiwatana (Thailand) Sonchat Ratiwatana
- Runners-up: (Finland) Harri Heliövaara (Sweden) Michael Ryderstedt
- Score: 6–7^{(7–4)}, 6–3, [10–3]

Events
Singles	men	women
Doubles	men	women
← 2010 ·	Beijing International Challenger	· 2012 →

Pierre-Ludovic Duclos and Artem Sitak were the defending champions, but decided not to participate.

2nd seeds Sanchai and Sonchat Ratiwatana won this tournament. They defeated unseeded Harri Heliövaara and Michael Ryderstedt in the final.

== Seeds ==
1. (China) Gong Maoxin / (China) Li Zhe (quarterfinals)
2. (Thailand) Sanchai Ratiwatana / (Thailand) Sonchat Ratiwatana (champions)
3. (United States) John Paul Fruttero / (South Africa) Raven Klaasen (semifinals)
4. (United States) Nicholas Monroe / (Austria) Nikolaus Moser (first round)

== Draw ==
=== Key ===
- Q = Qualifier
- WC = Wild card
- LL = Lucky loser
- Alt = Alternate
- SE = Special exempt
- PR = Protected ranking
- ITF = ITF entry
- JE = Junior exempt
- w/o = Walkover
- r = Retired
- d = Defaulted
- SR = Special ranking

=== Draw ===
First round
1	(China) M Gong (China) Z Li	6	7
(China) Ma Yanan (China) W Di	2	5
(Japan) B Sato (Thailand) D Udomchoke	6	6^{5}	[5]
(Finland) H Heliövaara (Sweden) M Ryderstedt	4	7^{7}	[10]
3	(United States) JP Fruttero (South Africa) R Klaasen	6	6
(Chinese Taipei) T Chen (Japan) Hiroki Moriya	3	4
(Chinese Taipei) C-p Hsieh (Chinese Taipei) H-h Lee	4	6	[11]
WC	(China) Chang Yu (China) G Wan	6	4	[13]
(Russia) D Matsukevich (Slovakia) M Semjan	6^{5}	6	[10]
(Japan) Junn Mitsuhashi (India) D Sharan	7^{7}	3	[8]
(Chinese Taipei) T-h Yang (Chinese Taipei) C-h Yi	7^{8}	4	[10]
4	(United States) N Monroe (Austria) N Moser	6^{6}	6	[3]
(Japan) H Kondo (Japan) G Soeda	6	6
WC	(China) Xue Feng (China) Z Zhang	4	4
(Israel) D Sela (Israel) A Weintraub	6^{1}	1
2	(Thailand) Sa Ratiwatana (Thailand) So Ratiwatana	7^{7}	6

Quarterfinals
1	(China) M Gong (China) Z Li	6	3	[5]
(Finland) H Heliövaara (Sweden) M Ryderstedt	1	6	[10]
3	(United States) JP Fruttero (South Africa) R Klaasen	6	3	[10]
WC	(China) Chang Yu (China) G Wan	2	6	[7]
(Russia) D Matsukevich (Slovakia) M Semjan	6	6^{3}	[8]
(Chinese Taipei) T-h Yang (Chinese Taipei) C-h Yi	3	7^{7}	[10]
(Japan) H Kondo (Japan) G Soeda	2	7^{8}	[6]
2	(Thailand) Sa Ratiwatana (Thailand) So Ratiwatana	6	6^{6}	[10]

Semifinals
(Finland) H Heliövaara (Sweden) M Ryderstedt	6	4	[10]
3	(United States) JP Fruttero (South Africa) R Klaasen	2	6	[3]
(Chinese Taipei) T-h Yang (Chinese Taipei) C-h Yi	4	5
2	(Thailand) Sa Ratiwatana (Thailand) So Ratiwatana	6	7

Final
(Finland) H Heliövaara (Sweden) M Ryderstedt	7^{7}	3	[3]
2	(Thailand) Sa Ratiwatana (Thailand) So Ratiwatana	6^{4}	6	[10]
