= 2010 Beijing International Challenger – Men's singles =

Men's singles
- 2010 Beijing International Challenger

Final
- Champions: (Croatia) Franko Škugor
- Runners-up: (France) Laurent Recouderc
- Score: 4–6, 6–4, 6–3

Events
Singles	men	women
Doubles	men	women
- Beijing International Challenger

Franko Škugor won the final against Laurent Recouderc 4–6, 6–4, 6–3.

== Seeds ==
1. (Republic of Ireland) Conor Niland (quarterfinals)
2. (Ukraine) Ivan Sergeyev (first round)
3. (France) Laurent Recouderc (Runner up)
4. (South Korea) Kim Young-jun (second round)
5. (Croatia) Franko Škugor (champion)
6. (Canada) Pierre-Ludovic Duclos (first round)
7. (Russia) Artem Sitak (second round)
8. (Russia) Andrey Kumantsov (quarterfinals)

== Draw ==
Key

- Q = Qualifier
- WC = Wild card
- LL = Lucky loser
- Alt = Alternate
- ITF = ITF entry
- PR = Protected ranking
- SR = Special ranking
- SE = Special exempt
- JE = Junior exempt
- JR = Junior Accelerator Programme entrant
- CO = College Accelerator Programme entrant
- NG = Next Gen Accelerator Program entrant
- w/o = Walkover
- r = Retired
- d = Defaulted

=== Finals ===
Semifinals
(China) Gong Maoxin	2	6	3
5	(Croatia) Franko Škugor	6	4	6
3	(France) Laurent Recouderc	6	6
(South Korea) Jun Woong-sun	3	4

Final
5	(Croatia) Franko Škugor	3	6	6
3	(France) Laurent Recouderc	6	4	3

=== Top half ===
First round
1	(Republic of Ireland) C Niland	6	6
(Lithuania) L Grigelis	2	3
(Japan) H Moriya	3	4
(Australia) J Statham	6	6
(Japan) Y Ito	3	5
(Austria) N Moser	6	7
(China) M Gong	1	6	7
6	(Canada) P-L Duclos	6	3	6^{4}
4	(South Korea) Y-j Kim	5	6	6
(Australia) S Kadir	7	4	2
WC	(China) D Wu	6^{4}	6	6
(Japan) H Kondo	7	3	2
(China) Z Zhang	6^{2}	5
(Chinese Taipei) T-h Yang	7	7
Q	(China) C Wang	4	2
5	(Croatia) F Škugor	6	6

Second round
1	(Republic of Ireland) C Niland	6	6
(Australia) J Statham	4	1
(Austria) N Moser	4	0
(China) M Gong	6	6
4	(South Korea) Y-j Kim	3	6	6^{4}
WC	(China) D Wu	6	4	7
(Chinese Taipei) T-h Yang	2	2
5	(Croatia) F Škugor	6	6

Quarterfinals
1	(Republic of Ireland) C Niland	3	6	3
(China) M Gong	6	2	6
WC	(China) D Wu	6^{4}	3
5	(Croatia) F Škugor	7	6

Semifinals
(China) M Gong	2	6	3
5	(Croatia) F Škugor	6	4	6

=== Bottom half ===
First round
7	(Russia) A Sitak	5	6	7
Q	(China) P Gao	7	0	5
WC	(China) Z Li	3	4
WC	(China) Y Bai	6	6
Q	(China) J Xu	7	2	3
(Ukraine) D Molchanov	5	6	6
(India) P Amritraj	6	1	r
3	(France) L Recouderc	3	2
8	(Russia) A Kumantsov	7	7
(Israel) A Weintraub	6^{8}	6^{3}
Q	(Brazil) T Fernandes	6	5	6
(Australia) K Hensel	4	7	2
(South Korea) W-s Jun	6	6
WC	(China) Y Chang	4	4
(Finland) H Heliövaara	6	7
2	(Ukraine) I Sergeyev	4	5

Second round
7	(Russia) A Sitak	6^{5}	0
WC	(China) Y Bai	7	6
(Ukraine) D Molchanov	5	3
3	(France) L Recouderc	7	6
8	(Russia) A Kumantsov	6	6
Q	(Brazil) T Fernandes	4	4
(South Korea) W-s Jun	6	6
(Finland) H Heliövaara	3	4

Quarterfinals
WC	(China) Y Bai	4	1
3	(France) L Recouderc	6	6
8	(Russia) A Kumantsov	6^{5}	1
(South Korea) W-s Jun	7	6

Semifinals
3	(France) L Recouderc	6	6
(South Korea) W-s Jun	3	4
