= 2009 Black Forest Open – Singles =

Singles
- 2009 Black Forest Open

Final
- Champion: (Czech Republic) Jan Hájek
- Runner-up: (France) Laurent Recouderc
- Score: 2–6, 6–3, 7–6^{(7–5)}

Events
Singles	Doubles
- Black Forest Open

Simon Greul was the champion in 2008, but he decided to not defend his title.
Jan Hájek won this tournament, by defeating Laurent Recouderc 2–6, 6–3, 7–6^{(7–5)} in the final.

== Seeds ==
1. (Germany) Florian Mayer (semifinals)
2. (Germany) Daniel Brands (semifinals)
3. (Czech Republic) Jan Hájek (champion)
4. (France) Laurent Recouderc (final)
5. (Czech Republic) Jiří Vaněk (first round)
6. (United Kingdom) James Ward (quarterfinals)
7. (Germany) Benedikt Dorsch (first round)
8. (France) Thierry Ascione (second round)

== Draw ==
Key

- Q = Qualifier
- WC = Wild card
- LL = Lucky loser
- Alt = Alternate
- ITF = ITF entry
- PR = Protected ranking
- SR = Special ranking
- SE = Special exempt
- JE = Junior exempt
- JR = Junior Accelerator Programme entrant
- CO = College Accelerator Programme entrant
- NG = Next Gen Accelerator Program entrant
- w/o = Walkover
- r = Retired
- d = Defaulted

=== Final four ===
Semifinals
1	(Germany) Florian Mayer	7	0	2^{r}
4	(France) Laurent Recouderc	6^{8}	6	5
3	(Czech Republic) Jan Hájek	6	6
2	(Germany) Daniel Brands	3	0

Final
4	(France) Laurent Recouderc	6	3	6^{5}
3	(Czech Republic) Jan Hájek	2	6	7

=== Top half ===
First round
1	(Germany) F Mayer	6	6
Q	(Germany) L Pörschke	4	4
PR	(France) J Haehnel	6^{4}	5
SE	(Jamaica) D Brown	7	7
(Austria) P Oswald	6	6
WC	(Germany) C-M Stebe	3	2
WC	(Germany) N Langer	2	6	6
5	(Czech Republic) J Vaněk	6	2	3
4	(France) L Recouderc	6	6
(Spain) F Vicente	3	1
(Germany) M Bachinger	6	7
(Spain) A Ramos Viñolas	2	6^{5}
WC	(Croatia) A Bilić	3	5
(France) J Dasnières de Veigy	6	7
(Serbia) N Ćirić	3	3
8	(France) T Ascione	6	6

Second round
1	(Germany) F Mayer	6	6
SE	(Jamaica) D Brown	0	3
(Austria) P Oswald	2	4
WC	(Germany) N Langer	6	6
4	(France) L Recouderc	6	6
(Germany) M Bachinger	4	2
(France) J Dasnières de Veigy	6	6
8	(France) T Ascione	2	3

Quarterfinals
1	(Germany) F Mayer	7	6
WC	(Germany) N Langer	6^{3}	1
4	(France) L Recouderc	6	6
(France) J Dasnières de Veigy	1	1

Semifinals
1	(Germany) F Mayer	7	0	2^{r}
4	(France) L Recouderc	6^{8}	6	5

=== Bottom half ===
First round
7	(Germany) B Dorsch	5	6	6^{1}
(Denmark) K Pless	7	3	7
(Australia) J Sirianni	7	7
(Czech Republic) J Pospíšil	6^{2}	6^{6}
Q	(Republic of Ireland) L Sorensen	7	4	6
(Spain) G Olaso	6^{6}	6	3
(Czech Republic) R Vik	3	1
3	(Czech Republic) J Hájek	6	6
6	(United Kingdom) J Ward	6	6
WC	(Germany) J Sude	3	3
(Latvia) A Juška	3	7	5
Q	(Australia) C Thomson	6	6^{4}	7
(Slovakia) M Kližan	7	6
(Ukraine) I Sergeyev	6^{5}	0
Q	(Germany) S Klör	6	6^{7}	4
2	(Germany) D Brands	1	7	6

Second round
(Denmark) K Pless	6^{2}	2
(Australia) J Sirianni	7	6
Q	(Republic of Ireland) L Sorensen	1	1
3	(Czech Republic) J Hájek	6	6
6	(United Kingdom) J Ward	1	6	6
Q	(Australia) C Thomson	6	3	3
(Slovakia) M Kližan	4	4
2	(Germany) D Brands	6	6

Quarterfinals
(Australia) J Sirianni	1	1
3	(Czech Republic) J Hájek	6	6
6	(United Kingdom) J Ward	2	3
2	(Germany) D Brands	6	6

Semifinals
3	(Czech Republic) J Hájek	6	6
2	(Germany) D Brands	3	0
