= 2011 Blu-express.com Tennis Cup – Singles =

Singles
- 2011 Blu-express.com Tennis Cup

Final
- Champion: (Argentina) Carlos Berlocq
- Runner-up: (Italy) Filippo Volandri
- Score: 6–3, 6–1

Events
Singles	Doubles
← 2010 ·	Blu-express.com Tennis Cup	· 2012 →

Carlos Berlocq successfully defended his last year's title. He defeated Filippo Volandri 6–3, 6–1 in the final.

== Seeds ==
1. (Argentina) Carlos Berlocq (champion)
2. (Italy) Filippo Volandri (final)
3. (Argentina) Diego Junqueira (first round)
4. (France) Benoît Paire (semifinals)
5. (Argentina) Leonardo Mayer (first round)
6. (Italy) Paolo Lorenzi (semifinals)
7. (Serbia) Nikola Ćirić (first round)
8. (France) David Guez (first round)

== Draw ==
=== Key ===
- Q = Qualifier
- WC = Wild card
- LL = Lucky loser
- Alt = Alternate
- SE = Special exempt
- PR = Protected ranking
- ITF = ITF entry
- JE = Junior exempt
- w/o = Walkover
- r = Retired
- d = Defaulted
- SR = Special ranking

=== Finals ===
Semifinals
1	(Argentina) Carlos Berlocq	6	6
6	(Italy) Paolo Lorenzi	1	2
4	(France) Benoît Paire	4	6	5
2/WC	(Italy) Filippo Volandri	6	2	7

Final
1	(Argentina) Carlos Berlocq	6	6
2/WC	(Italy) Filippo Volandri	3	1

=== Top half ===
First round
1	(Argentina) C Berlocq	6	6
WC	(Italy) T Fabbiano	2	2
(Spain) G Olaso	6	7^{7}
PR	(Spain) I Cervantes-Huegun	4	6^{4}
WC	(Italy) D Giorgini	7^{7}	5	3
(Austria) M Fischer	6^{3}	7	6
WC	(Austria) T Muster	4	7	6
5	(Argentina) L Mayer	6	5	2
3	(Argentina) D Junqueira	2	4
(Serbia) D Lajović	6	6
(Italy) Andrea Arnaboldi	3	6	3
(Argentina) F Argüello	6	4	6
Q	(Switzerland) Y Marti	5	1
Q	(Italy) Antonio Comporto	7	6
(France) J Eysseric	5	1
6	(Italy) P Lorenzi	7	6

Second round
1	(Argentina) C Berlocq	6^{11}	6	6
(Spain) G Olaso	7^{13}	2	1
(Austria) M Fischer	6	2	7^{7}
WC	(Austria) T Muster	0	6	6^{2}
(Serbia) D Lajović	6	3	7^{7}
(Argentina) F Argüello	3	6	6^{0}
Q	(Italy) A Comporto	2	1
6	(Italy) P Lorenzi	6	6

Quarterfinals
1	(Argentina) C Berlocq	6	6
(Austria) M Fischer	2	1
(Serbia) D Lajović	3	6^{5}
6	(Italy) P Lorenzi	6	7^{7}

Semifinals
1	(Argentina) C Berlocq	6	6
6	(Italy) P Lorenzi	1	2

=== Bottom half ===
First round
7	(Serbia) N Ćirić	6^{5}	4
(Spain) R Bautista-Agut	7^{7}	6
(Spain) A Menéndez	6	6
(Germany) Jan-Lennard Struff	3	2
(Italy) A di Mauro	7^{9}	6
(Austria) G Melzer	6^{7}	3
(Sweden) M Ryderstedt	6^{4}	5
4	(France) B Paire	7^{7}	7
8	(France) D Guez	2	2
(Argentina) Diego Schwartzman	6	6
(Italy) S Galvani	6	6
(Italy) G Naso	2	3
Q	(Italy) E Burzi	4	5
(Spain) G Granollers	6	7
Q	(Italy) L Vanni	4	2
2/WC	(Italy) F Volandri	6	6

Second round
(Spain) R Bautista-Agut	6	2	3
(Spain) A Menéndez	1	6	6
(Italy) A di Mauro	4	2
4	(France) B Paire	6	6
(Argentina) D S Schwartzman	3	7^{8}	6^{2}
(Italy) S Galvani	6	6^{6}	7^{7}
(Spain) G Granollers	2	3
2/WC	(Italy) F Volandri	6	6

Quarterfinals
(Spain) A Menéndez	2	6^{4}
4	(France) B Paire	6	7^{7}
(Italy) S Galvani	7^{7}	1	0
2/WC	(Italy) F Volandri	6^{3}	6	6

Semifinals
4	(France) B Paire	4	6	5
2/WC	(Italy) F Volandri	6	2	7
