= 2010 Beijing International Challenger =

- Date: August 2–8
- Edition: 1st
- Surface: Hard
- Location: Beijing, China

Champions

Men's singles
- (Croatia) Franko Škugor

Women's singles
- (Japan) Junri Namigata

Men's doubles
- (Canada) Pierre-Ludovic Duclos / (Russia) Artem Sitak

Women's doubles
- (China) Sun Sheng-Nan / (China) Zhang Shuai
- Beijing International Challenger

The 2010 Beijing International Challenger was a professional tennis tournament played on outdoor hard courts. It was the first edition of the tournament which is part of the 2010 ATP Challenger Tour. It took place in Beijing, China between 2 and 8 August 2010.

== ATP entrants ==
=== Seeds ===
Nationality	Player	Ranking*	Seeding
IRL	Conor Niland	158	1
UKR	Ivan Sergeyev	179	2
FRA	Laurent Recouderc	226	3
KOR	Kim Young-jun	256	4
CRO	Franko Škugor	283	5
CAN	Pierre-Ludovic Duclos	309	6
RUS	Artem Sitak	310	7
RUS	Andrey Kumantsov	322	8

- Rankings are as of July 26, 2010.

=== Other entrants ===
The following players received wildcards into the singles main draw:

- (China) Bai Yan
- (China) Chang Yu
- (China) Li Zhe
- (China) Wu Di

The following players received entry from the qualifying draw:

- (Brazil) Tiago Fernandes
- (China) Gao Peng
- (China) Wang Chuhan
- (China) Xu Junchao

== Champions ==
=== Men's singles ===
(Croatia) Franko Škugor def. (France) Laurent Recouderc, 4–6, 6–4, 6–3

=== Women's singles ===
(Japan) Junri Namigata def. (China) Zhang Shuai, 7–6(3) 6–3

=== Men's doubles ===
(Canada) Pierre-Ludovic Duclos / (Russia) Artem Sitak def. (Australia) Sadik Kadir / (India) Purav Raja, 7–6(4), 7–6(5)

=== Women's doubles ===
(China) Sun Shengnan / (China) Zhang Shuai def. (China) Ji Chunmei / (China) Liu Wanting, 4–6, 6–2, [10–5]
