= 2011 Beijing International Challenger =

- Date: 1–7 August
- Edition: 2nd
- Surface: Hard
- Location: Beijing, China

Champions

Men's singles
- (Uzbekistan) Farrukh Dustov

Women's singles
- (Chinese Taipei) Hsieh Su-wei

Men's doubles
- (Thailand) Sanchai Ratiwatana / (Thailand) Sonchat Ratiwatana

Women's doubles
- (Chinese Taipei) Chan Hao-ching / (Chinese Taipei) Chan Yung-jan
- Beijing International Challenger

The 2011 Beijing International Challenger was a professional tennis tournament played on hard courts. It was the second edition of the tournament which was part of the 2011 ATP Challenger Tour and the 2011 ITF Women's Circuit. It took place in Beijing, China between 1 and 7 August 2011.

== ATP entrants ==
=== Seeds ===
Country	Player	Rank^{1}	Seed
ISR	Dudi Sela	81	1
JPN	Go Soeda	135	2
ESP	Guillermo Olaso	171	3
ISR	Amir Weintraub	200	4
THA	Danai Udomchoke	220	5
FRA	Guillaume Rufin	225	6
RUS	Denis Matsukevich	238	7
SVK	Marek Semjan	250	8

- ^{1} Rankings are as of July 25, 2011.

=== Other entrants ===
The following players received wildcards into the singles main draw:

- (China) Chang Yu
- (South Korea) Jun Woong-sun
- (China) Li Zhe
- (China) Ma Yanan

The following players received entry from the qualifying draw:

- (Slovakia) Kamil Čapkovič
- (South Korea) Lim Yong-kyu
- (Japan) Junn Mitsuhashi
- (Austria) Nikolaus Moser

== WTA entrants ==
=== Seeds ===
Country	Player	Rank^{1}	Seed
THA	Tamarine Tanasugarn	79	1
TPE	Chan Yung-jan	118	2
JPN	Erika Sema	145	3
RUS	Nina Bratchikova	148	4
UKR	Tetiana Luzhanska	153	5
CHN	Han Xinyun	157	6
FRA	Caroline Garcia	158	7
KAZ	Zarina Diyas	170	8

- ^{1} Rankings are as of July 25, 2011.

=== Other entrants ===
The following players received wildcards into the singles main draw:

- (China) Duan Yingying
- (China) Liu Chang
- (China) Liu Wanting
- (China) Xu Yifan

The following players received entry from the qualifying draw:

- (China) Hu Yueyue
- (Japan) Aiko Nakamura
- (China) Zhao Di
- (China) Zhao Yijing

== Champions ==
=== Men's singles ===
(Uzbekistan) Farrukh Dustov def. (Chinese Taipei) Yang Tsung-hua, 6–1, 7–6^{(7–4)}

=== Women's singles ===
(Chinese Taipei) Hsieh Su-wei def. (Japan) Kurumi Nara, 6–2, 6–2

=== Men's doubles ===
(Thailand) Sanchai Ratiwatana / (Thailand) Sonchat Ratiwatana def. (Finland) Harri Heliövaara / (Sweden) Michael Ryderstedt, 6–7^{(7–4)}, 6–3, [10–3]

=== Women's doubles ===
(Chinese Taipei) Chan Hao-ching / (Chinese Taipei) Chan Yung-jan def. (Ukraine) Tetiana Luzhanska / (China) Zheng Saisai, 6–2, 6–3
