= 2009 Black Forest Open – Doubles =

Doubles
- 2009 Black Forest Open

Final
- Champions: (Czech Republic) Jan Hájek (Czech Republic) Dušan Karol
- Runners-up: (Slovakia) Martin Kližan (Canada) Adil Shamasdin
- Score: 4–6, 6–4, [10–5]

Events
Singles	Doubles
- Black Forest Open

Dick Norman and Kristof Vliegen chose to not defend their title.
Jan Hájek and Dušan Karol won in the final 4–6, 6–4, [10–5], against Martin Kližan and Adil Shamasdin.

== Seeds ==
1. (Australia) Rameez Junaid / (Australia) Joseph Sirianni (quarterfinals)
2. (Czech Republic) Jan Hájek / (Czech Republic) Dušan Karol (champions)
3. (France) Olivier Charroin / (United States) Rylan Rizza (first round)
4. (Poland) Tomasz Bednarek / (Poland) Mateusz Kowalczyk (semifinals)

== Draw ==
Key

- Q = Qualifier
- WC = Wild card
- LL = Lucky loser
- Alt = Alternate
- ITF = ITF entry
- PR = Protected ranking
- SR = Special ranking
- SE = Special exempt
- JE = Junior exempt
- JR = Junior Accelerator Programme entrant
- CO = College Accelerator Programme entrant
- NG = Next Gen Accelerator Program entrant
- w/o = Walkover
- r = Retired
- d = Defaulted

=== Draw ===
First round
1	(Australia) R Junaid (Australia) J Sirianni	7	6^{2}	[10]
(Czech Republic) J Pospíšil (Czech Republic) R Vik	6^{5}	7	[6]
(Slovakia) M Kližan (Canada) A Shamasdin	6	6
(Russia) N Nesterov (Spain) G Olaso	2	3
4	(Poland) T Bednarek (Poland) M Kowalczyk
(Spain) A Ramos-Viñolas (Spain) F Vicente	w/o
(Germany) D Klier (Republic of Ireland) L Sorensen	6	6
WC	(Germany) S Klör (Australia) C Thomson	2	2
(Denmark) K Pless (United Kingdom) J Ward	6	6
(Latvia) A Juška (Ukraine) I Sergeyev	3	4
(Serbia) N Ćirić (Montenegro) G Tošić	6	7
3	(France) O Charroin (United States) R Rizza	4	6^{3}
WC	(Germany) N Nitsche (Germany) M Zelch	3	2
WC	(Greece) N Karagiannis (Austria) P Oswald	6	6
(Jamaica) D Brown (Germany) L Pörschke	4	3
2	(Czech Republic) J Hájek (Czech Republic) D Karol	6	6

Quarterfinals
1	(Australia) R Junaid (Australia) J Sirianni	5	6	[4]
(Slovakia) M Kližan (Canada) A Shamasdin	7	2	[10]
4	(Poland) T Bednarek (Poland) M Kowalczyk	6	6
(Germany) D Klier (Republic of Ireland) L Sorensen	1	1
(Denmark) K Pless (United Kingdom) J Ward	4	1
(Serbia) N Ćirić (Montenegro) G Tošić	6	6
WC	(Greece) N Karagiannis (Austria) P Oswald	2	3
2	(Czech Republic) J Hájek (Czech Republic) D Karol	6	6

Semifinals
(Slovakia) M Kližan (Canada) A Shamasdin	6	6^{6}	[13]
4	(Poland) T Bednarek (Poland) M Kowalczyk	4	7	[11]
(Serbia) N Ćirić (Montenegro) G Tošić	3	5
2	(Czech Republic) J Hájek (Czech Republic) D Karol	6	7

Finals
(Slovakia) M Kližan (Canada) A Shamasdin	6	4	[5]
2	(Czech Republic) J Hájek (Czech Republic) D Karol	4	6	[10]
