= 2009 Internazionali di Tennis dell'Umbria =

- Date: 14 – 20 September
- Edition: 3rd
- Location: Todi, Italy

Champions

Singles
- (Germany) Simon Greul

Doubles
- (Austria) Martin Fischer / (Austria) Philipp Oswald
← 2008 ·	Internazionali di Tennis dell'Umbria	· 2010 →

The 2009 Internazionali di Tennis dell'Umbria was a professional tennis tournament played on outdoor red clay courts. It was the third edition of the tournament which was part of the 2009 ATP Challenger Tour. It took place in Todi, Italy between 14 and 20 September 2009.

== ATP entrants ==
=== Seeds ===
Nationality	Player	Ranking*	Seeding
GER	Simon Greul	65	1
ITA	Flavio Cipolla	117	2
ITA	Paolo Lorenzi	136	3
RSA	Kevin Anderson	148	4
FRA	Édouard Roger-Vasselin	158	5
ITA	Tomas Tenconi	170	6
AUT	Martin Fischer	171	7
ESP	Pablo Andújar	172	8

- Rankings are as of August 31, 2009.

=== Other entrants ===
The following players received wildcards into the singles main draw:

- (Italy) Francesco Aldi
- (Italy) Andrea Arnaboldi
- (Italy) Stefano Galvani
- (Italy) Giancarlo Petrazzuolo

The following players received a Special Exempt into the singles main draw:

- (Argentina) Carlos Berlocq

The following players received entry from the qualifying draw:

- (Italy) Thomas Fabbiano (as a Lucky Loser)
- (Belgium) David Goffin
- (Russia) Andrey Kuznetsov
- (Serbia) Boris Pašanski
- (Romania) Adrian Ungur

== Champions ==
=== Singles ===
(Germany) Simon Greul def. (Romania) Adrian Ungur, 2–6, 6–1, 7–6(6)

=== Doubles ===
(Austria) Martin Fischer / (Austria) Philipp Oswald def. (Spain) Pablo Santos / (Spain) Gabriel Trujillo-Soler, 7–5, 6–3
