= 2009 Black Forest Open =

- Date: August 31 – September 6
- Edition: 11th
- Location: Freudenstadt, Germany

Champions

Singles
- (Czech Republic) Jan Hájek

Doubles
- (Czech Republic) Jan Hájek / (Czech Republic) Dušan Karol
← 2008 ·	Black Forest Open	· 2010 →

The 2009 Black Forest Open was a professional tennis tournament played on outdoor red clay courts. It was the eleventh edition of the tournament which was part of the 2009 ATP Challenger Tour. It took place in Freudenstadt, Germany between 31 August and 6 September 2009.

== Singles entrants ==
=== Seeds ===
Nationality	Player	Ranking*	Seeding
GER	Florian Mayer	113	1
GER	Daniel Brands	126	2
CZE	Jan Hájek	147	3
FRA	Laurent Recouderc	150	4
CZE	Jiří Vaněk	164	5
GBR	James Ward	202	6
GER	Benedikt Dorsch	209	7
FRA	Thierry Ascione	210	8

- Rankings are as of August 24, 2009.

=== Other entrants ===
The following players received wildcards into the singles main draw:

- (Croatia) Ante Bilić
- (Germany) Nils Langer
- (Germany) Cedrik-Marcel Stebe
- (Germany) Jakob Sude

The following players received special exemption into the singles main draw:

- (Jamaica) Dustin Brown

The following players received entry from the qualifying draw:

- (Germany) Sascha Klör
- (Germany) Lars Pörschke
- (Republic of Ireland) Louk Sorensen
- (Australia) Clint Thomson

== Champions ==
=== Singles ===
(Czech Republic) Jan Hájek def. (France) Laurent Recouderc, 2–6, 6–3, 7–6(5)

=== Doubles ===
(Czech Republic) Jan Hájek / (Czech Republic) Dušan Karol def. (Slovakia) Martin Kližan / (Canada) Adil Shamasdin, 4–6, 6–4, [10–5]
