= 2011 Blu-express.com Tennis Cup – Doubles =

Doubles
- 2011 Blu-express.com Tennis Cup

Final
- Champions: (Italy) Stefano Ianni (Italy) Luca Vanni
- Runners-up: (Austria) Martin Fischer (Italy) Alessandro Motti
- Score: 6–4, 1–6, [11–9]

Events
Singles	Doubles
← 2010 ·	Blu-express.com Tennis Cup	· 2012 →

Flavio Cipolla and Alessio di Mauro were the defending champions but Cipolla decided not to participate.
Di Mauro partnered Enrico Burzi, however Francesco Aldi and Marco Cecchinato defeated them in the quarterfinals.

Stefano Ianni and Luca Vanni won the title, defeating Martin Fischer and Alessandro Motti 6–4, 1–6, [11–9] in the final.

== Seeds ==
Top seeds received a bye into the quarterfinals.

1. (Austria) Martin Fischer / (Italy) Alessandro Motti (final)
2. (Spain) Gerard Granollers / (Spain) Adrián Menéndez (first round)
3. (Italy) Stefano Ianni / (Italy) Luca Vanni (champions)
4. (Spain) Roberto Bautista-Agut / (France) Jonathan Eysseric (quarterfinals)

== Draw ==
=== Key ===
- Q = Qualifier
- WC = Wild card
- LL = Lucky loser
- Alt = Alternate
- SE = Special exempt
- PR = Protected ranking
- ITF = ITF entry
- JE = Junior exempt
- w/o = Walkover
- r = Retired
- d = Defaulted
- SR = Special ranking

=== Draw ===
First round
(Spain) I Cervantes-Huegun (Spain) G Olaso	6	6
(Italy) Andrea Grasselli (Italy) Roberto Tarpani	2	3
4	(Spain) R Bautista-Agut (France) J Eysseric	w/o
(Italy) Antonio Comporto (Italy) T Fabbiano
(Italy) G Naso (Italy) Fabio Rizzo	0	3
(Argentina) F Argüello (Argentina) L Mayer	6	6
(Greece) N Karagiannis (Germany) Jan-Lennard Struff	6	6
(Italy) Federico Cecconi (Italy) Andrea Marinelli	2	1
(Italy) Lorenzo Giustino (Italy) T Tenconi	3	1
3	(Italy) S Ianni (Italy) L Vanni	6	6
(Italy) Mattia Mannocci (Italy) Massimiliano Sirchio	0	5
(Italy) F Aldi (Italy) Marco Cecchinato	6	7
(Italy) Enrico Burzi (Italy) A di Mauro	6	4	[10]
2	(Spain) G Granollers (Spain) A Menéndez	1	6	[5]

Quarterfinals
1	(Austria) M Fischer (Italy) A Motti	6	3	[10]
(Spain) I Cervantes-Huegun (Spain) G Olaso	2	6	[7]
4	(Spain) R Bautista-Agut (France) J Eysseric	4	2
(Argentina) F Argüello (Argentina) L Mayer	6	6
(Greece) N Karagiannis (Germany) J-L Struff	1	4
3	(Italy) S Ianni (Italy) L Vanni	6	6
(Italy) F Aldi (Italy) M Cecchinato	6	3	[10]
(Italy) E Burzi (Italy) A di Mauro	4	6	[6]

Semifinals
1	(Austria) M Fischer (Italy) A Motti	5	7^{7}	[10]
(Argentina) F Argüello (Argentina) L Mayer	7	6^{3}	[7]
3	(Italy) S Ianni (Italy) L Vanni	6	6
(Italy) F Aldi (Italy) M Cecchinato	2	4

Final
1	(Austria) M Fischer (Italy) A Motti	4	6	[9]
3	(Italy) S Ianni (Italy) L Vanni	6	1	[11]
