= 2011 Beijing International Challenger – Women's doubles =

Women's doubles
- 2011 Beijing International Challenger

Final
- Champions: (Chinese Taipei) Chan Hao-ching (Chinese Taipei) Chan Yung-jan
- Runners-up: (Ukraine) Tetiana Luzhanska (China) Zheng Saisai
- Score: 6–2, 6–3

Events
Singles	men	women
Doubles	men	women
← 2010 ·	Beijing International Challenger	· 2012 →

Sun Shengnan and Zhang Shuai were the defending champions, but both chose not to participate.

Chan Hao-ching and Chan Yung-jan defeated Tetiana Luzhanska and Zheng Saisai in the final to win the title.

== Seeds ==
1. (Chinese Taipei) Chan Hao-ching / (Chinese Taipei) Chan Yung-jan (champions)
2. (Russia) Nina Bratchikova / (France) Irena Pavlovic (first round)
3. (China) Lu Jingjing / (China) Xu Yifan (quarterfinals)
4. (China) Han Xinyun / (China) Liu Wanting (semifinals)

== Draw ==
=== Key ===
- Q = Qualifier
- WC = Wild card
- LL = Lucky loser
- Alt = Alternate
- SE = Special exempt
- PR = Protected ranking
- ITF = ITF entry
- JE = Junior exempt
- w/o = Walkover
- r = Retired
- d = Defaulted
- SR = Special ranking

=== Draw ===
First round
1	(Chinese Taipei) H-c Chan (Chinese Taipei) Y-j Chan	6	7^{8}
(Japan) E Sema (Japan) Y Sema	3	6^{6}
(Chinese Taipei) W-h Hsu (Japan) R Tezuka	6	4	[8]
WC	(China) Z Yang (China) K Zhang	3	6	[10]
4	(China) X Han (China) W Liu	7^{7}	7^{7}
(Japan) K Hisami (Japan) M Miyamura	6^{1}	6^{5}
(Australia) A Bai (China) Y Zhao	6	6
(Chinese Taipei) S-y Kao (China) C Liang	3	4
(Thailand) L Kumkhum (Thailand) N Wannasuk	5	2
(Ukraine) T Luzhanska (China) S Zheng	7	6
WC	(China) JX Lu (China) Jia Lu	4	7	[6]
3	(China) Jin Lu (China) Y Xu	6	5	[10]
WC	(China) Y Li (China) Z Sun	6	6
(Japan) C Okadaue (Japan) M Tanaka	2	1
(China) T Li (Thailand) V Wongteanchai	7	3	[12]
2	(Russia) N Bratchikova (France) I Pavlovic	5	6	[10]

Quarterfinals
1	(Chinese Taipei) H-c Chan (Chinese Taipei) Y-j Chan	6	6
WC	(China) Z Yang (China) K Zhang	2	2
4	(China) X Han (China) W Liu	6	6
(Australia) A Bai (China) Y Zhao	4	2
(Ukraine) T Luzhanska (China) S Zheng	6	6
3	(China) Jin Lu (China) Y Xu	1	2
WC	(China) Y Li (China) Z Sun	5	7	[5]
(China) T Li (Thailand) V Wongteanchai	7	5	[10]

Semifinals
1	(Chinese Taipei) H-c Chan (Chinese Taipei) Y-j Chan	2	6	[10]
4	(China) X Han (China) W Liu	6	3	[3]
(Ukraine) T Luzhanska (China) S Zheng	4	6	[10]
(China) T Li (Thailand) V Wongteanchai	6	2	[6]

Finals
1	(Chinese Taipei) H-c Chan (Chinese Taipei) Y-j Chan	6	6
(Ukraine) T Luzhanska (China) S Zheng	2	3
