= 2012 Blu-express.com Tennis Cup – Singles =

Singles
- 2012 Blu-express.com Tennis Cup

Final
- Champion: (Russia) Andrey Kuznetsov
- Runner-up: (Italy) Paolo Lorenzi
- Score: 6–3, 2–0 ret.

Events
Singles	Doubles
← 2011 ·	Blu-express.com Tennis Cup	· 2013 →

Carlos Berlocq was the defending champion but decided not to participate.
Andrey Kuznetsov won the title, after Paolo Lorenzi retired after trailing 3–6, 0–2 in the final.

== Seeds ==
1. (Italy) Paolo Lorenzi (final, retired because of a left Achilles' tendon injury)
2. (Italy) Filippo Volandri (second round, retired because of a right Achilles' tendon injury)
3. (Romania) Adrian Ungur (first round)
4. (Russia) Andrey Kuznetsov (champion)
5. (France) Guillaume Rufin (quarterfinals)
6. (Italy) Matteo Viola (quarterfinals)
7. (Italy) Alessandro Giannessi (second round, retired because of a right knee injury)
8. (Germany) Dominik Meffert (semifinals)

== Draw ==
=== Key ===
- Q = Qualifier
- WC = Wild card
- LL = Lucky loser
- Alt = Alternate
- SE = Special exempt
- PR = Protected ranking
- ITF = ITF entry
- JE = Junior exempt
- w/o = Walkover
- r = Retired
- d = Defaulted
- SR = Special ranking

=== Finals ===
Semifinals
1	(Italy) Paolo Lorenzi	6	6
WC	(Italy) Alessio di Mauro	2	2
4	(Russia) Andrey Kuznetsov	6	6
8	(Germany) Dominik Meffert	3	4

Final
1	(Italy) Paolo Lorenzi	3	0^{r}
4	(Russia) Andrey Kuznetsov	6	2

=== Top half ===
First round
1	(Italy) P Lorenzi	6^{6}	6	6
(France) S Robert	7^{8}	3	3
(Spain) A Brugués-Davi	6	6
(Czech Republic) Marek Michalička	0	2
(Austria) G Melzer	7	6
(Austria) P Oswald	5	3
(Chile) C Saavedra-Corvalán	3	1
5	(France) G Rufin	6	6
3	(Romania) A Ungur	6	6^{2}	1
PR	(Serbia) F Krajinović	4	7^{7}	6
(Germany) B Knittel	6	6
Q	(Belgium) Germain Gigounon	2	2
(Argentina) G Andreozzi	3	6	6^{3}
WC	(Italy) A di Mauro	6	0	7^{7}
Q	(Italy) A Brizzi	6	6^{1}	2
7	(Italy) A Giannessi	1	7^{7}	6

Second round
1	(Italy) P Lorenzi	7^{7}	7^{7}
(Spain) A Brugués-Davi	6^{3}	6^{3}
(Austria) G Melzer
5	(France) G Rufin	w/o
(Serbia) F Krajinović	3	6	2
(Germany) B Knittel	6	4	6
WC	(Italy) A di Mauro	6	1
7	(Italy) A Giannessi	1	0^{r}

Quarterfinals
1	(Italy) P Lorenzi	3	7^{7}	6
5	(France) G Rufin	6	6^{4}	0
(Germany) B Knittel	3	4
WC	(Italy) A di Mauro	6	6

Semifinals
1	(Italy) P Lorenzi	6	6
WC	(Italy) A di Mauro	2	2

=== Bottom half ===
First round
6	(Italy) M Viola	7	6
WC	(Italy) W Trusendi	5	2
Q	(Belgium) Arthur De Greef	6	6
(Austria) M Fischer	3	1
(France) M Rodrigues	1	4
(Italy) T Fabbiano	6	6
WC	(Italy) Claudio Grassi	2	3
4	(Russia) A Kuznetsov	6	6
8	(Germany) D Meffert	7	6
(Argentina) R Olivo	5	4
(Italy) G Naso	6	6
Q	(Italy) Enrico Burzi	0	1
(Australia) J Kubler	6	6
WC	(Italy) D Giorgini	2	4
(Serbia) Ivan Bjelica	3	1
2	(Italy) F Volandri	6	6

Second round
6	(Italy) M Viola	6	6
Q	(Belgium) Arthur De Greef	3	0
(Italy) T Fabbiano	3	2
4	(Russia) A Kuznetsov	6	6
8	(Germany) D Meffert	2	6	6
(Italy) G Naso	6	3	2
(Australia) J Kubler	7	3
2	(Italy) F Volandri	5	0^{r}

Quarterfinals
6	(Italy) M Viola	4	4
4	(Russia) A Kuznetsov	6	6
8	(Germany) D Meffert	6	6
(Australia) J Kubler	3	4

Semifinals
4	(Russia) A Kuznetsov	6	6
8	(Germany) D Meffert	3	4
