= 2010 Beijing International Challenger – Women's singles =

Women's singles
- 2010 Beijing International Challenger

Final
- Champions: (Japan) Junri Namigata
- Runners-up: (China) Zhang Shuai
- Score: 7-6(3) 6-3

Events
Singles	men	women
Doubles	men	women
Beijing International Challenger	· 2011 →

Junri Namigata won the final against Zhang Shuai 7-6(3) 6-3.

== Seeds ==
1. (China) Zhang Shuai (final)
2. (China) Han Xinyun (semifinals)
3. (South Korea) Lee Jin-A (semifinals)
4. (Japan) Junri Namigata (champion)
5. (Japan) Tomoko Yonemura (second round)
6. (South Korea) Kim So-Jung (quarterfinals)
7. (China) Zhou Yi-miao (first round)
8. (Japan) Rika Fujiwara (quarterfinals)

== Main draw ==
=== Key ===
- Q = Qualifier
- WC = Wild card
- LL = Lucky loser
- Alt = Alternate
- SE = Special exempt
- PR = Protected ranking
- ITF = ITF entry
- JE = Junior exempt
- w/o = Walkover
- r = Retired
- d = Defaulted
- SR = Special ranking

=== Finals ===
Semifinals

Final

=== Top half ===
First round

Second round

Quarterfinals

Semifinals

=== Bottom half ===
First round

Second round

Quarterfinals

Semifinals
