= 2011 Blu-express.com Tennis Cup =

- Date: 12–18 September
- Edition: 5th
- Location: Todi, Italy

Champions

Singles
- (Argentina) Carlos Berlocq

Doubles
- (Italy) Stefano Ianni / (Italy) Luca Vanni
← 2010 ·	Internazionali di Tennis dell'Umbria	· 2012 →

The 2011 Blu-express.com Tennis Cup was a professional tennis tournament played on clay courts. It was the fifth edition of the tournament which was part of the 2011 ATP Challenger Tour. It took place in Todi, Italy between 12 and 18 September 2011.

== Singles main draw entrants ==
=== Seeds ===
Country	Player	Rank^{1}	Seed
ARG	Carlos Berlocq	74	1
ITA	Filippo Volandri	85	2
ARG	Diego Junqueira	104	3
FRA	Benoît Paire	120	4
ARG	Leonardo Mayer	139	5
ITA	Paolo Lorenzi	146	6
SRB	Nikola Ćirić	154	7
FRA	David Guez	165	8

- ^{1} Rankings are as of August 29, 2011.

=== Other entrants ===
The following players received wildcards into the singles main draw:

- (Italy) Thomas Fabbiano
- (Italy) Daniele Giorgini
- (Austria) Thomas Muster
- (Italy) Filippo Volandri

The following players received entry from the qualifying draw:

- (Italy) Enrico Burzi
- (Italy) Antonio Comporto
- (Switzerland) Yann Marti
- (Italy) Luca Vanni

== Champions ==
=== Singles ===
(Argentina) Carlos Berlocq def. (Italy) Filippo Volandri, 6–3, 6–1

=== Doubles ===
(Italy) Stefano Ianni / (Italy) Luca Vanni def. (Austria) Martin Fischer / (Italy) Alessandro Motti, 6–4, 1–6, [11–9]
