= 2010 Blu-express.com Tennis Cup =

Tennis tournament in Todi, Italia

- Date: 13 – 19 September
- Edition: 4th
- Location: Todi, Italy

Champions

Singles
- (Argentina) Carlos Berlocq

Doubles
- (Italy) Flavio Cipolla / (Italy) Alessio di Mauro
← 2009 ·	Internazionali di Tennis dell'Umbria	· 2011 →

The 2010 Blu-express.com Tennis Cup was a professional tennis tournament played on outdoor red clay courts. It was the fourth edition of the tournament which is part of the 2010 ATP Challenger Tour. It took place in Todi, Italy between 13 and 19 September 2010.

== Singles main draw entrants ==
=== Seeds ===
Nationality	Player	Ranking*	Seeding
ESP	Marcel Granollers	94	1
ARG	Carlos Berlocq	101	2
ITA	Paolo Lorenzi	103	3
ESP	Óscar Hernández	159	4
ARG	Diego Junqueira	187	5
ARG	Máximo González	191	6
MAR	Reda El Amrani	198	7
FRA	Guillaume Rufin	206	8

- Rankings are as of August 30, 2010.

=== Other entrants ===
The following players received wildcards into the singles main draw:

- (Italy) Marco Crugnola
- (Italy) Gianluca Naso
- (Italy) Matteo Trevisan

The following players received entry from the qualifying draw:

- (Spain) Gerard Granollers-Pujol (as a lucky loser)
- (Argentina) Patricio Heras
- (Slovenia) Borut Puc
- (Slovenia) Janez Semrajc
- (Italy) Walter Trusendi
- (Russia) Mikhail Vasiliev (as a lucky loser)

== Champions ==
=== Singles ===
(Argentina) Carlos Berlocq def. (Spain) Marcel Granollers, 6–4, 6–3

=== Doubles ===
(Italy) Flavio Cipolla / (Italy) Alessio di Mauro def. (Spain) Marcel Granollers / (Spain) Gerard Granollers-Pujol, 6–1, 6–4
