= 2012 Blu-express.com Tennis Cup =

- Date: 10–16 September
- Edition: 6th
- Surface: Clay
- Location: Todi, Italy

Champions

Singles
- (Russia) Andrey Kuznetsov

Doubles
- (Austria) Martin Fischer / (Austria) Philipp Oswald
← 2011 ·	Internazionali di Tennis dell'Umbria	· 2013 →

The 2012 Blu-express.com Tennis Cup was a professional tennis tournament played on clay courts. It was the sixth edition of the tournament which was part of the 2012 ATP Challenger Tour. It took place in Todi, Italy between 10 and 16 September 2012.

== Singles main draw entrants ==
=== Seeds ===
Country	Player	Rank^{1}	Seed
ITA	Paolo Lorenzi	69	1
ITA	Filippo Volandri	72	2
ROU	Adrian Ungur	110	3
RUS	Andrey Kuznetsov	127	4
FRA	Guillaume Rufin	129	5
ITA	Matteo Viola	157	6
ITA	Alessandro Giannessi	162	7
GER	Dominik Meffert	181	8

- ^{1} Rankings are as of August 27, 2012.

=== Other entrants ===
The following players received wildcards into the singles main draw:

- (Italy) Alessio di Mauro
- (Italy) Daniele Giorgini
- (Italy) Claudio Grassi
- (Italy) Walter Trusendi

The following players received entry from the qualifying draw:

- (Italy) Alberto Brizzi
- (Italy) Enrico Burzi
- (Belgium) Arthur De Greef
- (Belgium) Germain Gigounon

== Champions ==
=== Singles ===
- (Russia) Andrey Kuznetsov def. (Italy) Paolo Lorenzi, 6–3, 2–0 ret.

=== Doubles ===
- (Austria) Martin Fischer / (Austria) Philipp Oswald def. (Italy) Marco Cecchinato / (Italy) Alessio di Mauro, 6–3, 6–2
