= 2010 ZRE Katowice Bytom Open =

- Date: June 14 – June 20
- Edition: 5th
- Location: Bytom, Poland

Champions

Singles
- (Spain) Pere Riba

Doubles
- (Slovakia) Ivo Klec / (Ukraine) Artem Smirnov
- ZRE Katowice Bytom Open

The 2010 ZRE Katowice Bytom Open was a professional tennis tournament played on outdoor red clay courts. It was part of the 2010 ATP Challenger Tour. It took place in Bytom, Poland between 14 and 20 June 2010.

== ATP entrants ==
=== Seeds ===
| Nationality | Player | Ranking* | Seeding |
|---|---|---|---|
| ESP | Pere Riba | 96 | 1 |
| ESP | Óscar Hernández | 121 | 2 |
| UKR | Ivan Sergeyev | 172 | 3 |
| SVK | Martin Kližan | 184 | 4 |
| CHI | Jorge Aguilar | 226 | 5 |
| CHI | Paul Capdeville | 217 | 6 |
| RUS | Konstantin Kravchuk | 239 | 7 |
| HUN | Attila Balázs | 235 | 8 |

- Rankings are as of May 24, 2010.

=== Other entrants ===
The following players received wildcards into the singles main draw:

- (Slovenia) Marko Daniš
- (Poland) Rafał Gozdur
- (Poland) Grzegorz Panfil
- (Czech Republic) Adam Vejmělka

The following players received entry from the qualifying draw:

- (Chile) Adrián García
- (Hungary) Ádám Kellner
- (Poland) Błażej Koniusz
- (Czech Republic) Jaroslav Pospíšil

== Champions ==
=== Singles ===
(Spain) Pere Riba def. (Argentina) Facundo Bagnis, 6–0, 6–3

=== Doubles ===
(Slovakia) Ivo Klec / (Ukraine) Artem Smirnov def. (Russia) Konstantin Kravchuk / (Ukraine) Ivan Sergeyev, 1–6, 6–3, [10–3]
