= 2012 Blu-express.com Tennis Cup – Doubles =

Doubles
- 2012 Blu-express.com Tennis Cup

Final
- Champions: (Austria) Martin Fischer (Austria) Philipp Oswald
- Runners-up: (Italy) Marco Cecchinato (Italy) Alessio di Mauro
- Score: 6–3, 6–2

Events
Singles	Doubles
← 2011 ·	Blu-express.com Tennis Cup	· 2013 →

Stefano Ianni and Luca Vanni were the defending champions but decided not to participate.
Martin Fischer and Philipp Oswald won the title, defeating Marco Cecchinato and Alessio di Mauro 6–3, 6–2 in the final.

== Seeds ==
1. (Austria) Martin Fischer / (Austria) Philipp Oswald (champions)
2. (Argentina) Guido Andreozzi / (Argentina) Renzo Olivo (first round)
3. (Italy) Alessandro Motti / (France) Stéphane Robert (first round)
4. (Italy) Alessandro Giannessi / (Italy) Matteo Viola (semifinals)

== Draw ==
=== Key ===
- Q = Qualifier
- WC = Wild card
- LL = Lucky loser
- Alt = Alternate
- SE = Special exempt
- PR = Protected ranking
- ITF = ITF entry
- JE = Junior exempt
- w/o = Walkover
- r = Retired
- d = Defaulted
- SR = Special ranking

=== Draw ===
First round
1	(Austria) M Fischer (Austria) P Oswald	6	6
(Italy) Enrico Burzi (Italy) T Fabbiano	1	2
(Italy) D Giorgini (Italy) Claudio Grassi	4	6	[5]
(Germany) D Meffert (Germany) A Satschko	6	3	[10]
3	(Italy) A Motti (France) S Robert	1	4
(Italy) Omar Giacalone (Italy) G Naso	6	6
(Romania) Alexandru-Daniel Carpen (Chile) C Saavedra-Corvalán	6	6
WC	(Italy) Gabriele Broccucci (Italy) Federico Cecconi	0	0
(Italy) Enrico Becuzzi (Italy) P Lorenzi	5	0
(Germany) B Knittel (Italy) Matteo Volante	7	6
(Russia) A Kuznetsov (Czech Republic) Marek Michalička	1	4
4	(Italy) A Giannessi (Italy) M Viola	6	6
WC	(Italy) Mattia Mannocci (Italy) Alessio Verducci	0	2
(Italy) Marco Cecchinato (Italy) A di Mauro	6	6
(Serbia) Ivan Bjelica (Spain) A Brugués-Davi	6	6
2	(Argentina) G Andreozzi (Argentina) R Olivo	4	3

Quarterfinals
1	(Austria) M Fischer (Austria) P Oswald	7^{7}	6
(Germany) D Meffert (Germany) A Satschko	6^{3}	4
(Italy) Omar Giacalone (Italy) G Naso	6	1	[10]
(Romania) Alexandru-Daniel Carpen (Chile) C Saavedra-Corvalán	2	6	[4]
(Germany) B Knittel (Italy) Matteo Volante	4	6	[2]
4	(Italy) A Giannessi (Italy) M Viola	6	3	[10]
(Italy) Marco Cecchinato (Italy) A di Mauro	7	6
(Serbia) Ivan Bjelica (Spain) A Brugués-Davi	5	4

Semifinals
1	(Austria) M Fischer (Austria) P Oswald	7^{8}	2	[10]
(Italy) Omar Giacalone (Italy) G Naso	6^{6}	6	[8]
4	(Italy) A Giannessi (Italy) M Viola	3	7^{7}	[11]
(Italy) Marco Cecchinato (Italy) A di Mauro	6	6^{4}	[13]

Final
1	(Austria) M Fischer (Austria) P Oswald	6	6
(Italy) Marco Cecchinato (Italy) A di Mauro	3	2
