= 2011 Beijing International Challenger – Women's singles =

Women's singles
- 2011 Beijing International Challenger

Final
- Champion: (Chinese Taipei) Hsieh Su-wei
- Runner-up: (Japan) Kurumi Nara
- Score: 6–2, 6–2

Events
Singles	men	women
Doubles	men	women
← 2010 ·	Beijing International Challenger	· 2012 →

Junri Namigata was the defending champion but chose not to participate.

Hsieh Su-wei won the title, defeating Kurumi Nara 6–2, 6–2 in the final.

== Seeds ==
1. (Thailand) Tamarine Tanasugarn (second round, retired)
2. (Chinese Taipei) Chan Yung-jan (first round)
3. (Japan) Erika Sema (first round)
4. (Russia) Nina Bratchikova (first round)
5. (Ukraine) Tetiana Luzhanska (semifinals)
6. (China) Han Xinyun (second round)
7. (France) Caroline Garcia (second round)
8. (Kazakhstan) Zarina Diyas (second round)

== Main draw ==
=== Key ===
- Q = Qualifier
- WC = Wild card
- LL = Lucky loser
- Alt = Alternate
- SE = Special exempt
- PR = Protected ranking
- ITF = ITF entry
- JE = Junior exempt
- w/o = Walkover
- r = Retired
- d = Defaulted
- SR = Special ranking

=== Finals ===
Semifinals
(Japan) Kurumi Nara	6	6
5	(Ukraine) Tetiana Luzhanska	3	0
(France) Irena Pavlovic	4	5
(Chinese Taipei) Hsieh Su-wei	6	7

Final
(Japan) Kurumi Nara	2	2
(Chinese Taipei) Hsieh Su-wei	6	6

=== Top half ===
First round
1	(Thailand) T Tanasugarn	5	6	6
Q	(China) D Zhao	7	0	4
(China) Q Wang	1	6	0
(Japan) K Nara	6	4	6
(Thailand) N Luangnam	3	3
(Japan) Y Sema	6	6
(Thailand) L Kumkhum	3	0
7	(France) C Garcia	6	6
4	(Russia) N Bratchikova	1	4
Q	(China) Y Hu	6	6
(Japan) S Akita	3	1
Q	(China) Y Zhao	6	6
(Chinese Taipei) W-h Hsu	3	2
WC	(China) Y Duan	6	6
WC	(China) Y Xu	6	2	2
5	(Ukraine) T Luzhanska	1	6	6

Second round
1	(Thailand) T Tanasugarn	3	0^{r}
(Japan) K Nara	6	3
(Japan) Y Sema	6	7^{7}
7	(France) C Garcia	4	6^{2}
Q	(China) Y Hu	2	6	6
Q	(China) Y Zhao	6	4	2
WC	(China) Y Duan	6^{5}	1
5	(Ukraine) T Luzhanska	7^{7}	6

Quarterfinals
(Japan) K Nara	7^{7}	6
(Japan) Y Sema	6^{4}	0
Q	(China) Y Hu	2	3
5	(Ukraine) T Luzhanska	6	6

Semifinals
(Japan) K Nara	6	6
5	(Ukraine) T Luzhanska	3	0

=== Bottom half ===
First round
8	(Kazakhstan) Z Diyas	6	6
JE	(Ukraine) E Svitolina	1	3
WC	(China) W Liu	2	1
(South Korea) S-j Kim	6	6
WC	(China) C Liu	6^{4}	0
(China) S Zheng	7^{7}	6
(France) I Pavlovic	7^{7}	6
3	(Japan) E Sema	6^{3}	4
6	(China) X Han	6	6
(Japan) C Okadaue	3	4
Q	(Japan) A Nakamura	2	6	2
(Chinese Taipei) S-w Hsieh	6	4	6
(Japan) E Takao	2	4
(China) J Lu	6	6
(Thailand) V Wongteanchai	7	3	6
2	(Chinese Taipei) Y-j Chan	5	6	4

Second round
8	(Kazakhstan) Z Diyas	2	6	6^{2}
(South Korea) S-j Kim	6	3	7^{7}
(China) S Zheng	1	4
(France) I Pavlovic	6	6
6	(China) X Han	2	3
(Chinese Taipei) S-w Hsieh	6	6
(China) J Lu	3	6	3
(Thailand) V Wongteanchai	6	1	6

Quarterfinals
(South Korea) S-j Kim	2	4
(France) I Pavlovic	6	6
(Chinese Taipei) S-w Hsieh	6	6
(Thailand) V Wongteanchai	1	3

Semifinals
(France) I Pavlovic	4	5
(Chinese Taipei) S-w Hsieh	6	7
