= Hermans Egleskalns =

Latvian volleyball player (born 1990)

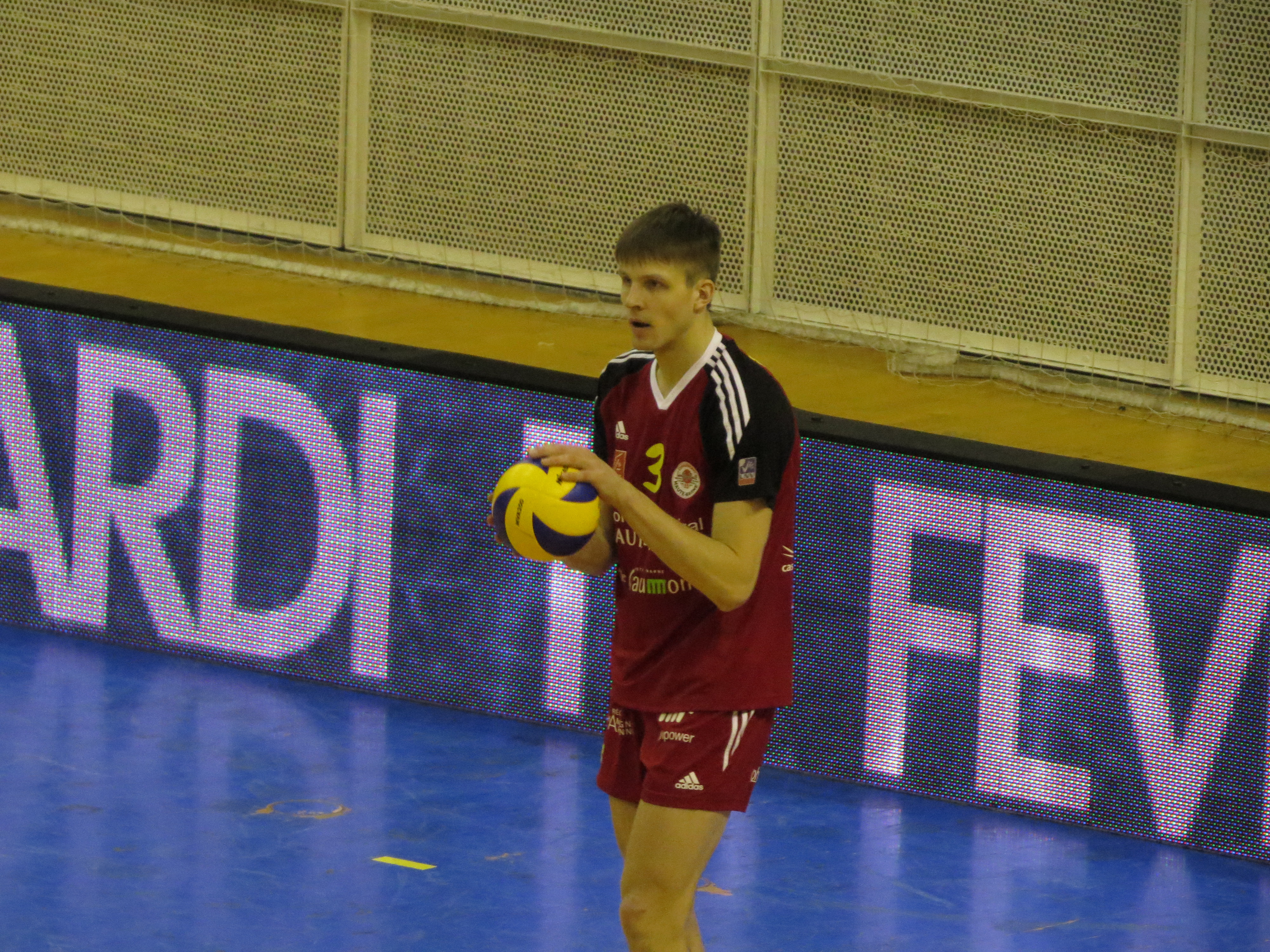
- Egleskalns in 2014

Personal information
- Nationality: (Latvia) Latvian
- Born: 8 December 1990 (age 35); Riga, Latvia
- Height: 2.02 m (6 ft 8 in)
- Weight: 87 kg (192 lb)
- Spike: 360 cm (142 in)
- Block: 345 cm (136 in)

Volleyball information
- Position: Opposite
- Current club: (Greece) Floisvos Palaio Faliro
- Number: 9

Career
| Years | Teams |
|---|---|
| 2007–2008; 2008–2009; 2009–2011; 2011–2013; 2013–2015; 2015–2016; 2016–2017; 2017–2020; 2020–2022; 2022–2023; 2023–2024; 2024–Dec. 24; Dec. 24– | (Latvia) VK Ozolnieki (Latvia) SK Cēsis (Finland) Perungan Pojat (Belgium) Noliko Maaseik (France) Chaumont VB 52 (Greece) Olympiacos Piraeus (France) Nice VB (France) Tours VB (Greece) Olympiacos Piraeus (France) Cambrai Volley (United Arab Emirates) Shabab Al-Ahli (France) Tours VB (Greece) Floisvos Palaio Faliro |

National team
| Latvia |

Hermans Egleskalns (born 8 December 1990) is a Latvian volleyball player, a member of the Latvia men's national volleyball team. For the 2024-25 season he plays for the Greek club Floisvos Palaio Faliro in the Greek Championship.

== Sporting achievements ==
=== National Championships ===
- 2010/2011 Finnish Championship, with Perungan Pojat
- 2011/2012 Belgian Championship, with Noliko Maaseik
- 2017/2018 French Championship, with Tours VB
- 2018/2019 French Championship, with Tours VB
- 2020/2021 Greek Championship, with Olympiacos Piraeus

=== National Cups ===
- 2010/2011 Finnish Cup, with Perungan Pojat
- 2011/2012 Belgian Cup, with Noliko Maaseik
- 2015/2016 Greek Cup, with Olympiacos Piraeus
- 2018/2019 French Cup, with Tours VB

=== National Super Cups ===
- 2011/2012 Belgian Super Cup, with Noliko Maaseik
- 2012/2013 Belgian Super Cup, with Noliko Maaseik

=== National League Cups ===
- 2015/2016 Greek League Cup, with Olympiacos Piraeus

=== Individually ===
- 2010/2011: Finnish Championship – Most Valuable Player
- 2016/2017 French Championship – Best Opposite
- 2017/2018 French Championship – Best Spiker
- 2017/2018 French Championship – Best Scorer
- 2020/2021 Greek Championship – Best Scorer
- 2020/2021 Greek Championship – Best Opposite
