= 2010 Blu-express.com Tennis Cup – Singles =

Singles
- 2010 Blu-express.com Tennis Cup

Final
- Champion: (Argentina) Carlos Berlocq
- Runner-up: (Spain) Marcel Granollers
- Score: 6–4, 6–3

Events
Singles	Doubles
← 2009 ·	Blu-express.com Tennis Cup	· 2011 →

Simon Greul was the defending champion but decided not to participate.
Carlos Berlocq won the final against Marcel Granollers 6–4, 6–3.

== Seeds ==
1. (Spain) Marcel Granollers (final)
2. (Argentina) Carlos Berlocq (champion)
3. (Italy) Paolo Lorenzi (first round)
4. (Spain) Óscar Hernández (quarterfinals)
5. (Argentina) Diego Junqueira (first round)
6. (Argentina) Máximo González (quarterfinals)
7. (Morocco) Reda El Amrani (first round)
8. (France) Guillaume Rufin (second round)

== Draw ==
=== Key ===
- Q = Qualifier
- WC = Wild card
- LL = Lucky loser
- Alt = Alternate
- SE = Special exempt
- PR = Protected ranking
- ITF = ITF entry
- JE = Junior exempt
- w/o = Walkover
- r = Retired
- d = Defaulted
- SR = Special ranking

=== Finals ===
Semifinals
1	(Spain) Marcel Granollers	6	6
(Italy) Alessio di Mauro	2	3
Q	(Slovenia) Janez Semrajc	6^{4}	3
2	(Argentina) Carlos Berlocq	7	6

Final
1	(Spain) Marcel Granollers	4	3
2	(Argentina) Carlos Berlocq	6	6

=== Top half ===
First round
1	(Spain) M Granollers	6	6
LL	(Russia) M Vasiliev	4	0
Q	(Italy) W Trusendi	5	4
(Spain) P Clar-Rosselló	7	6
(Russia) E Donskoy	6	6^{6}	4
(Argentina) J-M Aranguren	3	7	6
(Italy) D Giorgini	3	2
8	(France) G Rufin	6	6
4	(Spain) Ó Hernández	6	0	6
(Italy) F Aldi	2	6	2
Q	(Argentina) P Heras	4	1
(Italy) A Brizzi	6	6
WC	(Italy) M Trevisan	6	6
(Italy) A Arnaboldi	3	2
(Italy) A di Mauro	4	6	6
7	(Morocco) R El Amrani	6	3	4

Second round
1	(Spain) M Granollers	6	6^{5}	7
(Spain) P Clar-Rosselló	3	7	6^{3}
(Argentina) J-M Aranguren	6	7
8	(France) G Rufin	4	5
4	(Spain) Ó Hernández	6	6
(Italy) A Brizzi	2	4
WC	(Italy) M Trevisan	2	2
(Italy) A di Mauro	6	6

Quarterfinals
1	(Spain) M Granollers	6	6
(Argentina) J-M Aranguren	3	3
4	(Spain) Ó Hernández	1	2
(Italy) A di Mauro	6	6

Semifinals
1	(Spain) M Granollers	6	6
(Italy) A di Mauro	2	3

=== Bottom half ===
First round
5	(Argentina) D Junqueira	1	3
(Belgium) D Goffin	6	6
(Italy) F Cipolla	6	6^{5}	4
Q	(Slovenia) J Semrajc	4	7	6
WC	(Italy) M Crugnola	3	5
LL	(Spain) G Granollers-Pujol	6	7
(Italy) S Galvani	6^{6}	6	6
3	(Italy) P Lorenzi	7	4	0
6	(Argentina) M González	6	6
(Italy) M Viola	4	2
(Germany) B Knittel	7	2	6
(Australia) J Lemke	6^{2}	6	3
WC	(Italy) G Naso	6	6
Q	(Slovenia) B Puc	4	2
(Belgium) Y Mertens	3	4
2	(Argentina) C Berlocq	6	6

Second round
(Belgium) D Goffin	6^{5}	6	6^{5}
Q	(Slovenia) J Semrajc	7	4	7
LL	(Spain) G Granollers-Pujol	1	7	6
(Italy) S Galvani	6	6^{4}	4
6	(Argentina) M González	7	6
(Germany) B Knittel	5	1
WC	(Italy) G Naso	0	6	2
2	(Argentina) C Berlocq	6	4	6

Quarterfinals
Q	(Slovenia) J Semrajc	6	6
LL	(Spain) G Granollers-Pujol	4	3
6	(Argentina) M González	6^{4}	5
2	(Argentina) C Berlocq	7	7

Semifinals
Q	(Slovenia) J Semrajc	6^{4}	3
2	(Argentina) C Berlocq	7	6
