= 2010 Blu-express.com Tennis Cup – Doubles =

Doubles
- 2010 Blu-express.com Tennis Cup

Final
- Champions: (Italy) Flavio Cipolla (Italy) Alessio di Mauro
- Runners-up: (Spain) Marcel Granollers (Spain) Gerard Granollers-Pujol
- Score: 6–1, 6–4

Events
Singles	Doubles
- Blu-express.com Tennis Cup

Martin Fischer and Philipp Oswald were the defending champions but decided not to participate this year.
Flavio Cipolla and Alessio di Mauro won the final against Marcel Granollers and Gerard Granollers-Pujol 6–1, 6–4.

== Seeds ==
1. (Spain) Marcel Granollers / (Spain) Gerard Granollers-Pujol (final)
2. (Argentina) Máximo González / (Argentina) Diego Junqueira (semifinals)
3. (Italy) Flavio Cipolla / (Italy) Alessio di Mauro (champions)
4. (Italy) Daniele Giorgini / (Italy) Alessandro Motti (quarterfinals)

== Draw ==
Key

- Q = Qualifier
- WC = Wild card
- LL = Lucky loser
- Alt = Alternate
- ITF = ITF entry
- PR = Protected ranking
- SR = Special ranking
- SE = Special exempt
- JE = Junior exempt
- JR = Junior Accelerator Programme entrant
- CO = College Accelerator Programme entrant
- NG = Next Gen Accelerator Program entrant
- w/o = Walkover
- r = Retired
- d = Defaulted

=== Draw ===
First round
(Italy) A Arnaboldi (Spain) P Clar-Rosselló	6	5	r
(Austria) R Eitzinger (Austria) B Steinberger	2	5
4	(Italy) D Giorgini (Italy) A Motti	6	7
WC	(Italy) E Fioravante (Italy) G Naso	4	6^{6}
(Argentina) J-M Aranguren (Slovenia) B Puc	1	3
(Italy) F Torresi (Russia) M Vasiliev	6	6
(Italy) F Aldi (Italy) A Brizzi	6	6
(Argentina) P Heras (Italy) M Vierin	0	0
(Italy) W Trusendi (Italy) M Viola	5	4
3	(Italy) F Cipolla (Italy) A di Mauro	7	6
(Croatia) G Orešić (Slovenia) J Semrajc	6	6
WC	(Italy) M Mannocci (Italy) M Ribeca	2	2

Quarterfinals
1	(Spain) M Granollers (Spain) G Granollers-Pujol	6	6
(Austria) R Eitzinger (Austria) B Steinberger	2	1
4	(Italy) D Giorgini (Italy) A Motti	6	6^{5}	[5]
(Italy) F Torresi (Russia) M Vasiliev	4	7	[10]
(Italy) F Aldi (Italy) A Brizzi	2	1
3	(Italy) F Cipolla (Italy) A di Mauro	6	6
(Croatia) G Orešić (Slovenia) J Semrajc	4	4
2	(Argentina) M González (Argentina) D Junqueira	6	6

Semifinals
1	(Spain) M Granollers (Spain) G Granollers-Pujol	6	6
(Italy) F Torresi (Russia) M Vasiliev	2	2
3	(Italy) F Cipolla (Italy) A di Mauro	6	2	[12]
2	(Argentina) M González (Argentina) D Junqueira	1	6	[10]

Finals
1	(Spain) M Granollers (Spain) G Granollers-Pujol	1	4
3	(Italy) F Cipolla (Italy) A di Mauro	6	6
