= Black Forest Open =

Defunct tennis tournament
- Location: Freudenstadt, Germany
- Venue: TC Schierenberg
- Category: ATP Challenger Series
- Surface: Clay / Outdoors
- Draw: 32S/16Q/16D
- Prize money: €30,000

The Black Forest Open, also known as the Freudenstadt Open, was a tennis tournament held in Freudenstadt, Germany. It was held between 1999 and 2009 and in Alpirsbach, Germany between 1996 and 1998. The event was part of the ATP Challenger Series and was played on outdoor clay courts.

== Past finals ==
=== Singles ===
Year	Champion	Runner-up	Score
2010	Not Held		
2009	(Czech Republic) Jan Hájek	(France) Laurent Recouderc	2–6, 6–3, 7–6(5)
2008	(Germany) Simon Greul	(Germany) Matthias Bachinger	6–3, 6–4
2007	(Czech Republic) Ivo Minář	(France) Éric Prodon	7–5, 6–3
2006	(United States) Hugo Armando	(Germany) Torsten Popp	6–3, 3–6, 6–4
2005	(Argentina) Sergio Roitman	(Italy) Flavio Cipolla	7–5, 6–4
2004	(Spain) Santiago Ventura	(Norway) Jan Frode Andersen	6–3, 1–6, 6–3
2003	(Spain) Gorka Fraile	(Germany) Alexander Waske	3–6, 6–3, 6–4
2002	(Netherlands) Dennis van Scheppingen	(Spain) Dídac Pérez	6–1, 6–1
2001	(Spain) Albert Montañés	(Romania) Victor Hănescu	6–0, 6–3
2000	(Czech Republic) Michal Tabara	(Norway) Jan Frode Andersen	6–4, 6–4
1999	(Czech Republic) Michal Tabara	(Bulgaria) Orlin Stanoytchev	6–2, 7–6
1998	(Austria) Stefan Koubek	(Bulgaria) Orlin Stanoytchev	7–6, 6–4
1997	(Italy) Fabio Maggi	(Austria) Stefan Koubek	6–4, 5–7, 6–4
1996	(Sweden) Magnus Norman	(Bulgaria) Orlin Stanoytchev	6–4, 6–2

=== Doubles ===
Year	Champion	Runner-up	Score
2010	Not Held		
2009	(Czech Republic) Jan Hájek (Czech Republic) Dušan Karol	(Slovakia) Martin Kližan (Canada) Adil Shamasdin	4–6, 6–4, [10–5]
2008	(Belgium) Dick Norman (Belgium) Kristof Vliegen	(Austria) Rainer Eitzinger (Austria) Armin Sandbichler	6–3, 6–3
2007	(Spain) Marc López (Uruguay) Martín Vilarrubí	(Austria) Martin Slanar (Czech Republic) Pavel Šnobel	6–2, 6–7, [10–5]
2006	(Germany) Tomas Behrend (Germany) Dominik Meffert	(France) Alexandre Sidorenko (Germany) Mischa Zverev	7–5, 7–6
2005	(Czech Republic) Pavel Šnobel (Czech Republic) Martin Stepanek	(Germany) Sebastian Fitz (Germany) Simon Greul	6–2, 6–4
2004	(Romania) Gabriel Trifu (Germany) Alexander Waske	(Spain) Santiago Navarro (Spain) Santiago Ventura	6–3, 6–7, 6–2
2003	(Germany) Franz Stauder (Germany) Alexander Waske	(Poland) Mariusz Fyrstenberg (Poland) Marcin Matkowski	6–4, 7–5
2002	(Argentina) Diego del Río (Argentina) Leonardo Olguín	(Spain) Joan Balcells (Russia) Yuri Schukin	7–6, 6–4
2001	(Germany) Franz Stauder (Germany) Alexander Waske	(Sweden) Fredrik Lovén (South Africa) Damien Roberts	6–3, 4–6, 6–3
2000	(Romania) Ionut Moldovan (Russia) Yuri Schukin	(Austria) Julian Knowle (Switzerland) Jean-Claude Scherrer	3–6, 6–3, 6–4
1999	(Spain) Joan Balcells (Austria) Thomas Strengberger	(Czech Republic) Michal Tabara (Czech Republic) Robin Vik	4–6, 6–2, 6–3
1998	(Czech Republic) Tomáš Cibulec (Czech Republic) Leoš Friedl	(Germany) Marcus Hilpert (Switzerland) Filippo Veglio	6–1, 7–6
1997	(Germany) Mathias Huning (Australia) Grant Silcock	(Spain) Álex López Morón (Italy) Fabio Maggi	4–6, 6–2, 6–3
1996	(Germany) Karsten Braasch (Germany) Jens Knippschild	(Latvia) Ģirts Dzelde (Sweden) Tomas Nydahl	1–6, 6–3, 7–5
