= ZRE Katowice Bytom Open =

Defunct tennis tournament
- Event name: Bytom
- Location: Bytom, Poland
- Category: ATP Challenger Tour
- Surface: Clay (red)
- Draw: 32S/32Q/16D
- Prize money: €30,000+H

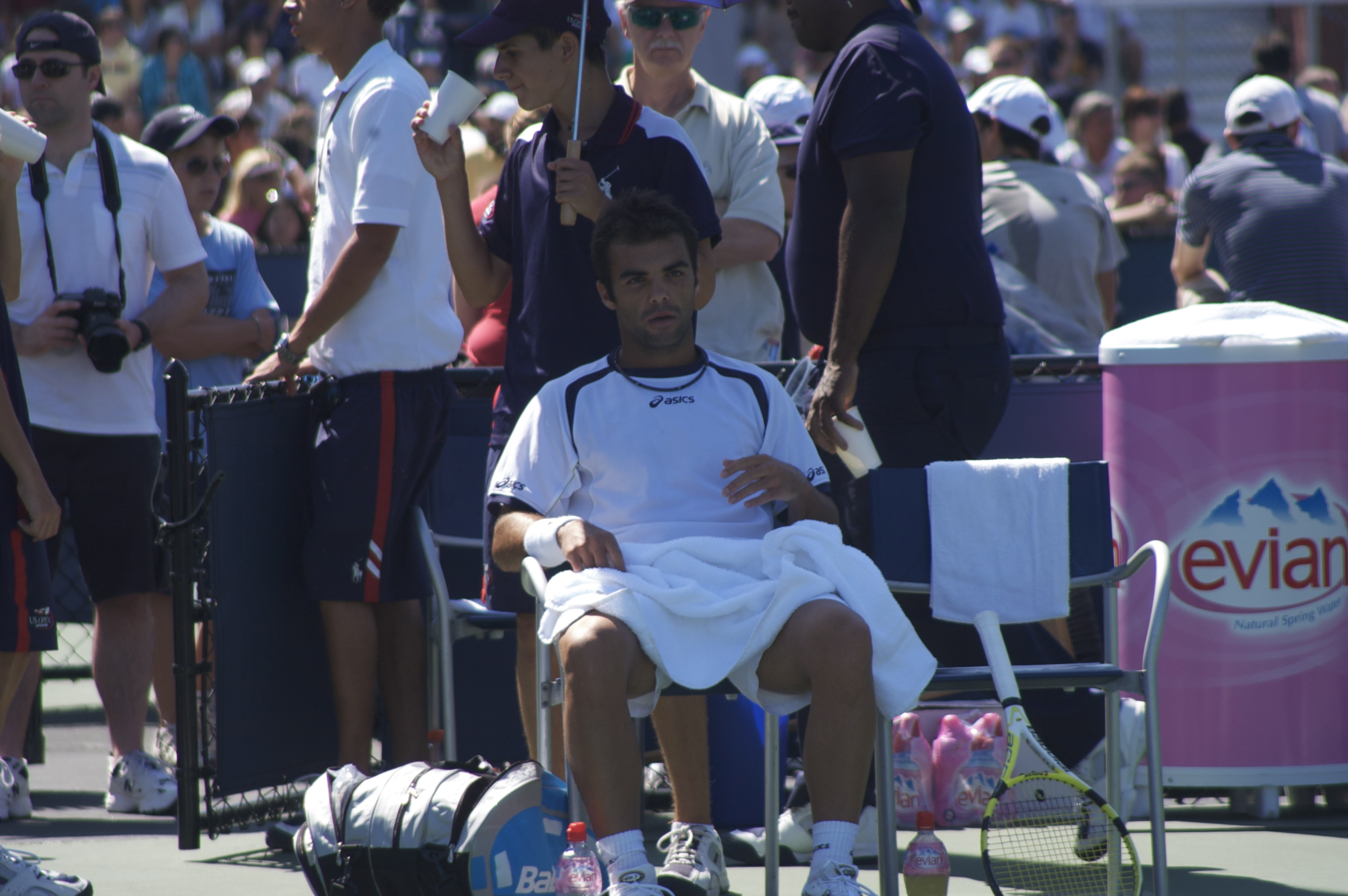
The latest singles champion, Frenchman Laurent Recouderc, took the title over Pablo Santos in 2008

The ZRE Katowice Bytom Open (former Polska Energia Open) was a professional tennis tournament played on outdoor red clay courts. It was part of the Association of Tennis Professionals (ATP) Challenger Tour and held annually in Bytom, Poland, from 2007 until 2010.

== Past finals ==
=== Singles ===
Year	Champion	Runner-up	Score
2010	(Spain) Pere Riba	(Argentina) Facundo Bagnis	6–0, 6–3
2009	(France) Laurent Recouderc	(Czech Republic) Jan Hájek	6–3, 6–4
2008	(France) Laurent Recouderc	(Spain) Pablo Santos	6–3, 6–4
2007	(Australia) Peter Luczak	(Italy) Simone Vagnozzi	6–3, 6–3

=== Doubles ===
Year	Champions	Runners-up	Score
2010	(Slovakia) Ivo Klec (Ukraine) Artem Smirnov	(Russia) Konstantin Kravchuk (Ukraine) Ivan Sergeyev	1–6, 6–3, [10–3]
2009	(Spain) Pablo Santos (Spain) Gabriel Trujillo Soler	(Czech Republic) Jan Hájek (Czech Republic) Dušan Karol	6–3, 7–6(3)
2008	(Poland) Marcin Gawron (Poland) Mateusz Kowalczyk	(Australia) Raphael Durek (Poland) Błażej Koniusz	6–4, 3–6, 10–7
2007	(United States) Hugo Armando (Argentina) Brian Dabul	(Poland) Tomasz Bednarek (Poland) Michał Przysiężny	6–4, 1–6, 10–5
