= Nicolás Todero =

Argentine tennis player (born 1979)

- Full name: Nicolás Todero
- Country (sports): Argentina
- Residence: Miami, U.S.
- Born: 15 April 1979 (age 46) La Plata, Argentina
- Height: 183 cm (6 ft 0 in)
- Turned pro: 1998
- Retired: 2009
- Plays: Right handed
- Prize money: US$188,600

Singles
- Career record: 0–1
- Career titles: 0
- Highest ranking: No. 219 (29 November 2004)

Grand Slam singles results
- Australian Open: Q2 (2005)
- French Open: Q1 (2005)
- Wimbledon: Q3 (2008)
- US Open: Q1 (2005)

Doubles
- Highest ranking: No. 241 (15 September 2003)
- Last updated on: 8 July 2017.

Nicolás Todero (Spanish pronunciation: [nikoˈlas toˈðeɾo]; born 15 April 1979) is a former professional tennis player from Argentina.

== Biography ==
Todero was born in La Plata, son of Jorge, a tennis coach who later served as Argentina's Fed Cup captain for several years.

=== Professional career ===
Based in Florida, Todero began competing professionally in 1998. He beat a young Andy Roddick in straight sets, at a Futures event in Vero Beach in 1999. It was Roddick's first appearance in a Futures main draw tournament, which gives Todero the distinction of being the first player to defeat the American in a professional match. Todero started featuring at the Challenger level in 2000, a format in which he won many matches during the years without progressing to a final. He was a runner-up in the doubles at two Challenger tournaments, and he won ten singles titles in Futures. He qualified for his only ATP Tour event, at the 2002 Swiss Open in Gstaad, where he lost in the first round to Austria's Stefan Koubek. He narrowly missed out on qualifying for the 2008 Wimbledon Championships, with a five set loss to Simon Stadler in the final qualifier. His last year on the professional circuit was in 2009.

=== Coaching ===
Todero now coaches for the USTA, through which he has worked closely with Stefan Kozlov and Frances Tiafoe. A former coach of Jesse Levine, Todero has been a USTA national coach since 2010.
