= Beijing International Challenger =

Tournament information
- Location: Beijing, China
- Venue: National Tennis Center
- Surface: Hard
- Website: Official website
ATP Tour
- Category: ATP Challenger Tour
- Draw: 32S/32Q/16D
- Prize money: $75,000+H
WTA Tour
- Category: ITF Women's Circuit
- Draw: 32S/32Q/16D
- Prize money: $75,000

The Beijing International Challenger was a tennis tournament held in Beijing, China, from 2010 to 2013. The event was part of the ATP Challenger Tour and the ITF Women's Circuit and was played on outdoor hardcourts. It was also part of the China Open Series. The mixed tournament was cancelled at the end of 2013. However, the Women's tournament was relocated, and upgraded to a WTA 125K series tournament which was first held in Nanchang, China, in 2014. The new tournament is named Jiangxi International Women's Tennis Open.

== Past finals ==
=== Men's singles ===
| Year | Champion | Runner-up | Score |
|---|---|---|---|
| 2013 | (Chinese Taipei) Lu Yen-Hsun | (Japan) Go Soeda | 6–2, 6–4 |
| 2012 | (Slovenia) Grega Žemlja | (China) Wu Di | 6–3, 6–0 |
| 2011 | (Uzbekistan) Farrukh Dustov | (Chinese Taipei) Yang Tsung-hua | 6–1, 7–6^{(7–4)} |
| 2010 | (Croatia) Franko Škugor | (France) Laurent Recouderc | 4–6, 6–4, 6–3 |

=== Women's singles ===
| Year | Champion | Runner-up | Score |
|---|---|---|---|
| 2013 | (China) Zhang Shuai | (China) Zhou Yimiao | 6–2, 6–1 |
| 2012 | (China) Wang Qiang | (Chinese Taipei) Chan Yung-jan | 6–2, 6–4 |
| 2011 | (Chinese Taipei) Hsieh Su-wei | (Japan) Kurumi Nara | 6–2, 6–2 |
| 2010 | (Japan) Junri Namigata | (China) Zhang Shuai | 7–6^{(7–3)}, 6–3 |

=== Men's doubles ===
| Year | Champions | Runners-up | Score |
|---|---|---|---|
| 2013 | (Japan) Toshihide Matsui (Thailand) Danai Udomchoke | (China) Gong Maoxin (China) Zhang Ze | 4-6, 7–6^{(8–6)}, [10–8] |
| 2012 | (Thailand) Sanchai Ratiwatana (Thailand) Sonchat Ratiwatana | (India) Yuki Bhambri (India) Divij Sharan | 7–6^{(7–3)}, 2–6, [10–6] |
| 2011 | (Thailand) Sanchai Ratiwatana (Thailand) Sonchat Ratiwatana | (Finland) Harri Heliövaara (Sweden) Michael Ryderstedt | 6–7^{(7–4)}, 6–3, [10–3] |
| 2010 | (Canada) Pierre-Ludovic Duclos (Russia) Artem Sitak | (Australia) Sadik Kadir (India) Purav Raja | 7–6^{(7–4)}, 7–6^{(7–5)} |

=== Women's doubles ===
| Year | Champions | Runners-up | Score |
|---|---|---|---|
| 2013 | (China) Liu Chang (China) Zhou Yimiao | (Japan) Misaki Doi (Japan) Miki Miyamura | 7–6^{(7–1)}, 6–4 |
| 2012 | (China) Liu Wanting (China) Sun Shengnan | (Chinese Taipei) Chan Chin-wei (China) Han Xinyun | 5–7, 6–0, [10–7] |
| 2011 | (Chinese Taipei) Chan Hao-ching (Chinese Taipei) Chan Yung-jan | (Ukraine) Tetiana Luzhanska (China) Zheng Saisai | 6–2, 6–3 |
| 2010 | (China) Sun Shengnan (China) Zhang Shuai | (China) Ji Chunmei (China) Liu Wanting | 4–6, 6–2, [10–5] |
