= Laurent Recouderc =

French tennis player

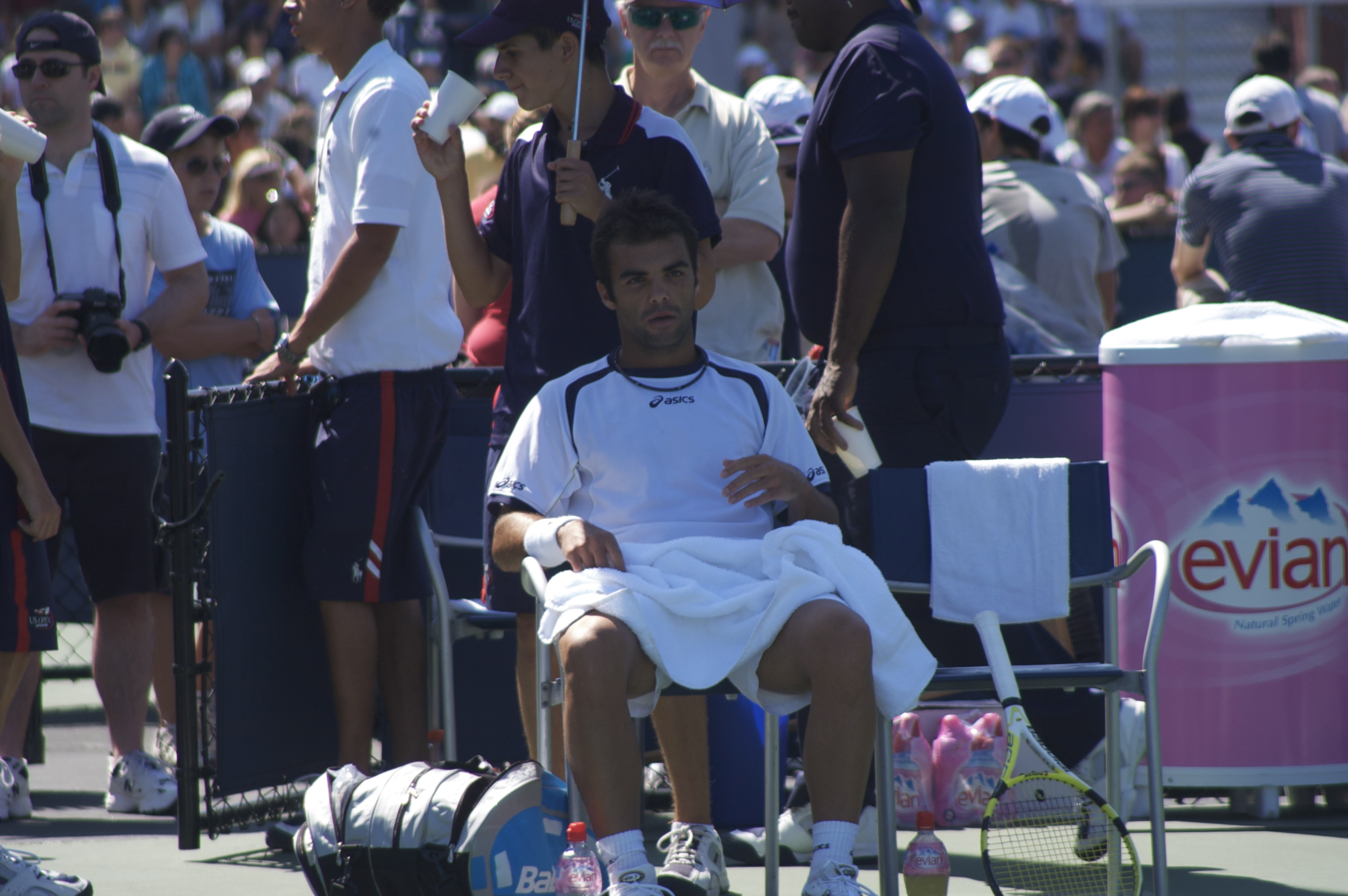
- Country (sports): Andorra; France
- Residence: Toulouse, France
- Born: 10 July 1984 (age 41) Toulouse, France
- Height: 1.78 m (5 ft 10 in)
- Turned pro: 2003
- Plays: Right-handed (two-handed backhand)
- Prize money: US$ 419,108

Singles
- Career record: 3–12
- Career titles: 0
- Highest ranking: No. 124 (26 October 2009)

Grand Slam singles results
- Australian Open: Q2 (2008, 2010)
- French Open: 2R (2007)
- US Open: 1R (2008)

Doubles
- Career record: 2–3
- Career titles: 0
- Highest ranking: No. 320 (19 July 2010)

Grand Slam doubles results
- French Open: 3R (2010)

Team competitions
- Davis Cup: 7–8
Medal record
Tennis
Representing Andorra
Gold medal – first place	2015 Iceland	Singles
Bronze medal – third place	2015 Iceland	Men's Doubles
- Last updated on: 20 July 2019.

Laurent Recouderc is a professional tennis player from France. He was born 10 July 1984 in Toulouse.

== Career ==
On the junior circuit, Recouderc had defeated Tomáš Berdych, Robin Söderling, and Jo-Wilfried Tsonga. He has spent his professional career playing primarily on the Challenger and Future circuits. He played in the 2007 French Open, where he defeated Sam Querrey in five sets before losing to Novak Djokovic in four sets. He received a wild card to compete in the 2010 French Open, where he lost to the No. 5 seed Söderling in the first round.

== Future and Challenger finals ==
=== Singles: 25 (17–8) ===
Legend (singles) ATP Challenger Tour (3–3) ITF Futures Tour (13–5) ITF Satellites (1–0)	Titles by surface Hard (5–2) Clay (12–6) Grass (0–0) Carpet (0–0)

Result	W–L	Date	Tournament	Tier	Surface	Opponent	Score
Win	1–0	Jun 2003	Morocco F2, Marrakesh	Futures	Clay	(Argentina) Brian Dabul	6–4, 6–4
Win	2–0	Aug 2003	Russia F1, Sergiyev Posad	Futures	Clay	(Ukraine) Sergei Yaroshenko	6–1, 3–6, 6–4
Win	3–0	Aug 2003	Russia F2, Balashikha	Futures	Clay	(Russia) Alexander Pavlioutchenkov	6–0, 6–2
Loss	3–1	May 2005	Hungary F2, Miskolc	Futures	Clay	(Slovakia) František Polyak	3–6, 4–6
Loss	3–2	Aug 2005	Lebanon F2, Jounieh	Futures	Clay	(Monaco) Benjamin Balleret	3–6, 5–7
Loss	3–3	Oct 2005	Ukraine F1, Horlivka	Futures	Clay	(Cyprus) Photos Kallias	5–7, 4–6
Win	4–3	Feb 2006	Great Britain, Sheffield	Satellites	Hard (i)	(United Kingdom) Josh Goodall	6–3, 6–7^{(7–9)}, 6–3
Win	5–3	Oct 2006	France F17, Saint-Dizier	Futures	Hard (i)	(France) Édouard Roger-Vasselin	7–5, 6–3
Win	6–3	Apr 2007	Egypt F1, Cairo	Futures	Clay	(Argentina) Juan Pablo Villar	6–3, 5–7, 6–1
Win	7–3	Apr 2007	Egypt F2, Cairo	Futures	Clay	(Egypt) Mohamed Mamoun	6–4, 6–3
Win	8–3	May 2007	Great Britain F9, Bournemouth	Futures	Clay	(Czech Republic) Jan Minář	7–6^{(7–3)}, 6–4
Win	9–3	May 2007	Algeria F1, Algiers	Futures	Clay	(Germany) Alex Satschko	6–3, 6–0
Win	10–3	Jan 2008	China F1, Shenzhen	Futures	Hard	(Denmark) Frederik Nielsen	6–3, 6–3
Win	11–3	Jun 2008	Bytom, Poland	Challenger	Clay	(Spain) Pablo Santos González	6–3, 6–4
Loss	11–4	Nov 2008	Astana, Kazakhstan	Challenger	Hard (i)	(Kazakhstan) Andrey Golubev	6–1, 5–7, 3–6
Win	12–4	Mar 2009	Rabat, Morocco	Challenger	Clay	(Spain) Santiago Ventura	6–0, 6–2
Win	13–4	Jun 2009	Bytom, Poland	Challenger	Clay	(Czech Republic) Jan Hájek	6–3, 6–4
Loss	13–5	Sep 2009	Freudenstadt, Germany	Challenger	Clay	(Czech Republic) Jan Hájek	6–2, 3–6, 6–7^{(5–7)}
Loss	13–6	Aug 2010	Beijing, China	Challenger	Hard	(Croatia) Franko Škugor	6–3, 4–6, 3–6
Loss	13–7	Oct 2011	Chile F7, Santiago	Futures	Clay	(Chile) Guillermo Hormazábal	5–7, 2–6
Loss	13–8	Jan 2012	Egypt F1, Cairo	Futures	Clay	(Russia) Andrey Kuznetsov	4–6, 3–6
Win	14–8	Jul 2012	Estonia F2, Kuressaare	Futures	Clay	(Estonia) Vladimir Ivanov	7–5, 7–6^{(7–3)}
Win	15–8	Sep 2012	Georgia F1, Tbilisi	Futures	Clay	(Italy) Matteo Marrai	6–1, 7–5
Win	16–8	Mar 2013	Vietnam F1, Bạc Liêu	Futures	Hard	(France) Lucas Pouille	0–6, 6–4, 7–6^{(7–4)}
Win	17–8	Apr 2013	Vietnam F2, Ho Chi Minh City	Futures	Hard	(United States) Nicolas Meister	6–3, 6–4
