= Michael Ryderstedt =

Swedish tennis player

- Country (sports): Sweden
- Residence: Stockholm, Sweden
- Born: 12 November 1984 (age 40); Stockholm, Sweden
- Height: 1.88 m (6 ft 2 in)
- Turned pro: 2002
- Retired: 2012
- Plays: Left-handed
- Prize money: $313,148

Singles
- Career record: 8–13 (in ATP World Tour and Grand Slam main draw matches, and in Davis Cup)
- Career titles: 0
- Highest ranking: No. 130 (18 July 2005)

Grand Slam singles results
- Australian Open: Q2 (2005, 2006)
- French Open: Q1 (2005)
- Wimbledon: Q3 (2005)
- US Open: Q2 (2007, 2011)

Doubles
- Career record: 5–7 (in ATP (World) Tour and Grand Slam main draw matches, and in Davis Cup)
- Career titles: 0
- Highest ranking: No. 150 (13 July 2009)
- Last updated on: 30 January 2012.

Michael Ryderstedt (born 12 November 1984) is a former professional tennis player from Sweden.

Ryderstedt was born in Stockholm. In August 2001, at the Fischer Junior Open he captured the doubles title with Dudi Sela of Israel.

His best accomplishment on the ATP tour until 2011 is his semifinal at the 2004 If Stockholm Open, where he was defeated by that year's eventual winner Thomas Johansson.

Ryderstedt's highest singles ranking was World No. 130 (July 2005) and his highest doubles ranking was World No. 154 (June 2009). In October 2012, Ryderstedt announced his retirement from tennis.

== ATP career finals ==
=== Doubles: 1 (0–1) ===
Legend (pre/post 2009) Grand Slam Tournaments (0–0) Tennis Masters Cup / ATP World Tour Finals (0–0) ATP Masters Series / ATP World Tour Masters 1000 (0–0) ATP International Series Gold / ATP World Tour 500 Series (0–0) ATP International Series / ATP World Tour 250 Series (0–1)	Finals by surface Hard (0–1) Clay (0–0) Grass (0–0) Carpet (0–0)

Outcome	No.	Date	Tournament	Surface	Partner	Opponents in the final	Score in the final
Runner-up	1.	12 October 2008	Stockholm, Sweden	Hard (i)	(Sweden) Johan Brunström	(Sweden) Jonas Björkman (Zimbabwe) Kevin Ullyett	1–6, 3–6

== Challenger Singles titles ==
Legend (singles)
Grand Slam (0)
Tennis Masters Cup (0)
ATP Masters Series (0)
ATP Tour (0)
Challengers (1)

No.	Date	Tournament	Surface	Opponent in the final	Score
1.	7 February 2005	Dallas, U.S.	Hard	(Brazil) André Sá	^{2}6–7, 7–6^{5}, 6–2

== Challenger Doubles titles ==
No.	Date	Tournament	Surface	Partner	Opponents in the final	Score
1.	1 May 2006	Telde, Spain	Clay	(Poland) Adam Chadaj	(Spain) David Marrero (Spain) Daniel Muñoz de la Nava	5–7, 6–3, [10–7]
2.	28 July 2008	Tampere, Finland	Clay	(Sweden) Ervin Eleskovic	(Finland) Harri Heliövaara (Finland) Henri Kontinen	6–3, 6–4

=== Runners-up (6) ===
No.	Date	Tournament	Surface	Partner	Opponents in the final	Score
1.	19 July 2004	Valladolid, Spain	Hard	(Pakistan) Aisam-ul-Haq Qureshi	(France) Jean-François Bachelot (France) Nicolas Mahut	6–3, 6–4
2.	31 July 2006	Timişoara, Romania	Clay	(Sweden) Ervin Eleskovic	(Romania) Victor Crivoi (Romania) Victor Ioniță	6–3, 6–4
3.	17 July 2007	Manchester, United Kingdom	Grass	(Netherlands) Jesse Huta Galung	(India) Rohan Bopanna (Pakistan) Aisam-ul-Haq Qureshi	4–6, 6–3, [10–5]
4.	29 October 2007	Louisville, U.S.	Hard	(United Kingdom) Richard Bloomfield	(United States) John Isner (United States) Travis Parrott	6–4, 6–4
5.	9 November 2008	Rimouski, Canada	Hard (i)	(Denmark) Kristian Pless	(Canada) Vasek Pospisil (Canada) Milos Raonic	5–7, 6–4, [10–6]
6.	7 August 2011	Beijing, China	Hard	(Finland) Harri Heliövaara	(Thailand) Sanchai Ratiwatana (Thailand) Sonchat Ratiwatana	6–7^{(4–7)}, 6–3, [10–3]
