= Gao Peng =

Chinese politician

- 高朋

Vice Mayor of Beijing
- In office January 2023 – April 2024
- Mayor: Yin Yong

Communist Party Secretary of Shunyi District
- In office April 2018 – March 2023
- Deputy: Sun Junmin
- Preceded by: Wang Gang
- Succeeded by: Gong Zongyuan

Governor of Shunyi District
- In office December 2015 – April 2018
- Party Secretary: Wang Gang
- Preceded by: Lu Yingchuan
- Succeeded by: Sun Junmin

Personal details
- Born: July 1972 (age 54) Fengcheng County, Liaoning, China
- Party: Chinese Communist Party (1996–2024; expelled)
- Education: Dongbei University of Finance and Economics; Southwestern University of Finance and Economics

Gao Peng (Chinese: 高朋; pinyin: Gao Peng; born July 1972) is a former Chinese economist and politician who his entire career in Beijing, capital of China. As of April 2024 he was under investigation by the Central Commission for Discipline Inspection. Previously he served as vice mayor of Beijing. He has served as a representative of the National Congress of the Chinese Communist Party.

== Early life and education ==
Gao was born in Fengcheng County (now Fengcheng), Liaoning, in July 1972. He graduated from Dongbei University of Finance and Economics and Southwestern University of Finance and Economics.

== Career ==
Gao once served as deputy director of the Financing Planning Department of Beijing Metro Group Co., Ltd. He joined the Chinese Communist Party (CCP) in June 1996, and entered the workforce in August of the same year. He moved to Beijing Infrastructure Investment Co., Ltd. in December 2003, becoming general manager assistant in February 2005 and deputy general manager in October 2007.

Gao got involved in politics in December 2009. He was appointed vice governor of Fengtai District and two years later was admitted to member of the CCP Fengtai District Committee, the district's top authority. In January 2014, he became deputy director of Beijing Municipal Development and Reform Commission, and held that office until December 2015. In December 2015, he was named acting governor of Shunyi District, confirmed in January 2016. He rose to become party secretary, the top political position in the district, in April 2018. He was appointed vice mayor of Beijing in January 2023, although he remained party secretary of Shunyi District until March 2023.

=== Downfall ===
On 21 April 2024, he was suspended for "suspected serious discipline violations" by the Central Commission for Discipline Inspection (CCDI), the party's internal disciplinary body, and the National Supervisory Commission, the highest anti-corruption agency of China. On October 22, he was stripped of his posts within the CCP and in the public office. On November 6, he was arrested by the Supreme People's Procuratorate for suspected bribe taking and dereliction of duty.

On 24 March 2025, Gao was indicted on suspicion of accepting bribes and dereliction of duty. On September 10, the prosecutors accused Gao of taking advantage of his different positions in Beijing between 2007 and 2024 to seek profits for various companies and individuals in job promotions, business operations, and project contracting, in return, he accepted money and property worth over 43.8 million yuan ($ million) either himself or via his family members. He was sentenced to 12 years and fined 3 million yuan for taking bribes and dereliction of duty, the money and property that Gao had received in the form of bribes, as well as any interest arising from them, will be turned over to the national treasury.

Government offices
Preceded by Lu Yingchuan	Governor of Shunyi District; 2016–2018	Succeeded by Sun Junmin
Party political offices
Preceded by Wang Gang	Communist Party Secretary of Shunyi District; 2018–2023	Succeeded by Gong Zongyuan
