= Pablo Santos (tennis) =

Spanish tennis player (born 1984)

Pablo Santos Gonzalez
- Country (sports): Spain
- Residence: Granada, Spain
- Born: 15 June 1984 (age 41) Granada, Spain
- Height: 1.83 m (6 ft 0 in)
- Turned pro: 2002
- Plays: Right-handed
- Coach: Salvador Martínez
- Prize money: US$175,723

Singles
- Career record: 0–0
- Career titles: 0
- Highest ranking: No. 181 (8 June 2009)

Grand Slam singles results
- Australian Open: –
- French Open: –
- Wimbledon: –
- US Open: –

Doubles
- Career titles: 0
- Highest ranking: No. 144 (20 July 2009)

Pablo Santos González (Spanish pronunciation: [ˈpaβlo ˈsantos ɣonˈθaleθ]; (Note: In isolation, González is pronounced [ɡonˈθaleθ].) born 15 June 1984, in Granada, Spain) is a Spanish professional tennis player. He has won three ATP Challenger titles, all in doubles.

== ATP Tournaments Finals ==
=== Runner-Up (1) ===
Legend
ATP Challenger Series

No.	Date	Tournament	Surface	Opponent in the final	Score in the final
1.	16 June 2008	Bytom, Poland	Clay	(France) Laurent Recouderc	3–6, 4–6
