= 2013 ITF Men's Circuit (January–March) =

The 2013 ITF Men's Circuit is the 2013 edition of the entry level tour for men's professional tennis, and is the third tier tennis tour below the Association of Tennis Professionals, World Tour and Challenger Tour. It is organised by the International Tennis Federation (ITF) who additionally organizes the ITF Women's Circuit which is an entry-level tour for women's professional tennis. Future tournaments are organized to offer either $10,000 or $15,000 in prize money and tournaments which offering hospitality to players competing in the main draw give additional ranking points which are valid under the ATP ranking system, and are to be organized by a national association or approved by the ITF Men's Circuit Committee.

The tournaments are played on a rectangular flat surface, commonly referred to as a tennis court. The dimensions of a tennis court are defined and regulated by the ITF and the court is 23.78 meters (78.0 feet) long, 10.97 meters (36.0 feet) wide. Its width is 8.23 meters (27.0 feet) for singles matches and 10.97 meters (36.0 feet) for doubles matches. Tennis is played on a variety of surfaces and each surface has its own characteristics which affect the playing style of the game. There are four main types of courts depending on the materials used for the court surface, clay, hard, grass and carpet courts with the ITF classifying five different pace settings ranging from slow to fast.

== Point distribution ==
Tournament Category	W	F	SF	QF	R16	R32
Futures 15,000+H	35	20	10	4	1	0
Futures 15,000	27	15	8	3	1	0
Futures 10,000+H	27	15	8	3	1	0
Futures 10,000	18	10	6	2	1	0

== Key ==
$15,000 tournaments
$10,000 tournaments

== Month ==
=== January ===
Week of	Tournament	Winner	Runners-up	Semifinalists	Quarterfinalists
January 7	Germany F1 Futures; Schwieberdingen, Germany; Carpet (indoor) $10,000; Singles and Doubles Draw	(Latvia) Andis Juška; 6–4, 6–4	(France) Fabrice Martin	(Germany) Christian Hirschmüller (Switzerland) Sandro Ehrat	(Germany) Peter Torebko (Germany) Stefan Seifert (Germany) Nils Langer (Czech Republic) Michal Schmid
January 7	Germany F1 Futures; Schwieberdingen, Germany; Carpet (indoor) $10,000; Singles and Doubles Draw	(Republic of Ireland) James Cluskey (Germany) Alexander Satschko; 6–0, 6–1	(Germany) Dominique Denis Maden (Germany) Yannick Maden	(Germany) Christian Hirschmüller (Switzerland) Sandro Ehrat	(Germany) Peter Torebko (Germany) Stefan Seifert (Germany) Nils Langer (Czech Republic) Michal Schmid
January 7	Turkey F1 Futures; Antalya-Kaya Belek, Turkey; Hard $10,000; Singles and Doubles Draw	(Serbia) Ilija Bozoljac; 7–6^{(7–4)}, 6–4	(Spain) Guillermo Olaso	(Czech Republic) Dušan Lojda (Belgium) Kimmer Coppejans	(Japan) Yasutaka Uchiyama (Chinese Taipei) Huang Liang-chi (Serbia) Ilija Vučić (China) Gong Maoxin
January 7	Turkey F1 Futures; Antalya-Kaya Belek, Turkey; Hard $10,000; Singles and Doubles Draw	(Japan) Arata Onozawa (Japan) Yasutaka Uchiyama; 6–3, 6–3	(France) Julien Obry (Japan) Shuichi Sekiguchi	(Czech Republic) Dušan Lojda (Belgium) Kimmer Coppejans	(Japan) Yasutaka Uchiyama (Chinese Taipei) Huang Liang-chi (Serbia) Ilija Vučić (China) Gong Maoxin
January 7	USA F1 Futures (United States) Plantation, United States; Clay $10,000; Singles and Doubles Draw	(Romania) Victor Crivoi; 6–2, 6–4	(Portugal) Pedro Sousa	(Japan) Taro Daniel (United Kingdom) Alex Bogdanovic	(Monaco) Benjamin Balleret (Spain) Juan Lizariturry (Argentina) Patricio Heras (Colombia) Michael Quintero
January 7	USA F1 Futures (United States) Plantation, United States; Clay $10,000; Singles and Doubles Draw	(Croatia) Franko Škugor (Portugal) Pedro Sousa; 6–2, 6–3	(Portugal) João Domingues (Burundi) Hassan Ndayishimiye	(Japan) Taro Daniel (United Kingdom) Alex Bogdanovic	(Monaco) Benjamin Balleret (Spain) Juan Lizariturry (Argentina) Patricio Heras (Colombia) Michael Quintero
January 14	France F1 Futures; Bagnoles-de-l'Orne, France; Clay (indoor) $10,000+H	(Germany) Tim Pütz; 6–0, 4–1, retired	(Hungary) Márton Fucsovics	(France) Romain Jouan (Belgium) Germain Gigounon	(Belgium) Yannick Mertens (Germany) Moritz Baumann (France) Dorian Descloix (France) Jules Marie
January 14	France F1 Futures; Bagnoles-de-l'Orne, France; Clay (indoor) $10,000+H	(Spain) Iván Arenas-Gualda (Spain) Enrique López Pérez; Walkover	(Germany) Moritz Baumann (Germany) Tim Pütz	(France) Romain Jouan (Belgium) Germain Gigounon	(Belgium) Yannick Mertens (Germany) Moritz Baumann (France) Dorian Descloix (France) Jules Marie
January 14	Germany F2 Futures; Stuttgart-Stammheim, Germany; Hard (indoor) $10,000	(Germany) Nils Langer; 3–6, 7–6^{(8–6)}, 6–3	(Latvia) Andis Juška	(Belgium) Julien Cagnina (Belarus) Dzmitry Zhyrmont	(Germany) Peter Torebko (France) Fabrice Martin (Poland) Marcin Gawron (Germany) Kevin Krawietz
January 14	Germany F2 Futures; Stuttgart-Stammheim, Germany; Hard (indoor) $10,000	(Germany) Philipp Marx (Romania) Florin Mergea; 6–2, 6–2	(Republic of Ireland) James Cluskey (Germany) Alexander Satschko	(Belgium) Julien Cagnina (Belarus) Dzmitry Zhyrmont	(Germany) Peter Torebko (France) Fabrice Martin (Poland) Marcin Gawron (Germany) Kevin Krawietz
January 14	Great Britain F1 Futures (United Kingdom) Glasgow, United Kingdom; Hard (indoor) $10,000	(United Kingdom) Marcus Willis; 6–4, 6–4	(United Kingdom) Josh Goodall	(United States) Eric Quigley (United States) Christian Harrison	(United Kingdom) Joshua Milton (United Kingdom) Edward Corrie (United Kingdom) Richard Bloomfield (United Kingdom) Daniel Evans
January 14	Great Britain F1 Futures (United Kingdom) Glasgow, United Kingdom; Hard (indoor) $10,000	(United Kingdom) David Rice (United Kingdom) Sean Thornley; 7–6^{(7–5)}, 6–2	(United Kingdom) Scott Clayton (United Kingdom) Richard Gabb	(United States) Eric Quigley (United States) Christian Harrison	(United Kingdom) Joshua Milton (United Kingdom) Edward Corrie (United Kingdom) Richard Bloomfield (United Kingdom) Daniel Evans
January 14	Israel F1 Futures; Eilat, Israel; Hard (indoor) $10,000	(Czech Republic) Jiří Veselý; 6–1, 6–2	(Spain) Guillermo Olaso	(Slovakia) Norbert Gombos (Italy) Claudio Grassi	(Serbia) Filip Krajinović (Slovakia) Jozef Kovalík (Israel) Alon Elia (Italy) Marco Cecchinato
January 14	Israel F1 Futures; Eilat, Israel; Hard (indoor) $10,000	(Czech Republic) Roman Jebavý (Czech Republic) Jiří Veselý; 6–3, 6–1	(Spain) Jaime Pulgar-García (Spain) Andoni Vivanco-Guzmán	(Slovakia) Norbert Gombos (Italy) Claudio Grassi	(Serbia) Filip Krajinović (Slovakia) Jozef Kovalík (Israel) Alon Elia (Italy) Marco Cecchinato
January 14	Turkey F2 Futures; Antalya-Kaya Belek, Turkey; Hard $10,000	(Serbia) Ilija Bozoljac; 6–4, 6–4	(Spain) Pablo Carreño Busta	(Belgium) Kimmer Coppejans (Ukraine) Artem Smirnov	(Spain) Gerard Granollers (Chinese Taipei) Huang Liang-chi (Russia) Alexander Kudryavtsev (Bosnia and Herzegovina) Damir Džumhur
January 14	Turkey F2 Futures; Antalya-Kaya Belek, Turkey; Hard $10,000	(Croatia) Toni Androić (Croatia) Dino Marcan; 4–6, 6–3, [10–4]	(Brazil) Augusto Laranja (Brazil) Pedro Zerbini	(Belgium) Kimmer Coppejans (Ukraine) Artem Smirnov	(Spain) Gerard Granollers (Chinese Taipei) Huang Liang-chi (Russia) Alexander Kudryavtsev (Bosnia and Herzegovina) Damir Džumhur
January 14	USA F2 Futures (United States) Sunrise, United States; Clay $10,000	(United States) Robby Ginepri; 6–4, 6–2	(Monaco) Benjamin Balleret	(United States) Bjorn Fratangelo (Italy) Alberto Brizzi	(Portugal) Pedro Sousa (Italy) Enrico Burzi (Romania) Victor Crivoi (Brazil) Thales Turini
January 14	USA F2 Futures (United States) Sunrise, United States; Clay $10,000	(Brazil) Daniel Dutra da Silva (Brazil) Pedro Sakamoto; 2–6, 7–6^{(10–8)}, [12–10]	(Italy) Alberto Brizzi (Italy) Enrico Burzi	(United States) Bjorn Fratangelo (Italy) Alberto Brizzi	(Portugal) Pedro Sousa (Italy) Enrico Burzi (Romania) Victor Crivoi (Brazil) Thales Turini
January 21	France F2 Futures; Bressuire, France; Hard (indoor) $10,000+H	(France) Pierre-Hugues Herbert; 6–3, 6–2	(France) Romain Jouan	(France) Davy Sum (France) Mathieu Rodrigues	(Belgium) Germain Gigounon (France) Fabrice Martin (Belgium) Yannik Reuter (Serbia) Danilo Petrović
January 21	France F2 Futures; Bressuire, France; Hard (indoor) $10,000+H	(France) Pierre-Hugues Herbert (France) Nicolas Renavand; 6–2, 7–6^{(9–7)}	(Republic of Ireland) James Cluskey (Montenegro) Goran Tošić	(France) Davy Sum (France) Mathieu Rodrigues	(Belgium) Germain Gigounon (France) Fabrice Martin (Belgium) Yannik Reuter (Serbia) Danilo Petrović
January 21	Germany F3 Futures; Kaarst, Germany; Carpet (indoor) $15,000	(Slovakia) Miloslav Mečíř; 6–2, 7–6^{(7–3)}	(Netherlands) Matwé Middelkoop	(Belarus) Egor Gerasimov (Croatia) Nikola Mektić	(Netherlands) Jesse Huta Galung (Serbia) Ivan Bjelica (Belarus) Dzmitry Zhyrmont (Belarus) Aliaksandr Bury
January 21	Germany F3 Futures; Kaarst, Germany; Carpet (indoor) $15,000	(Netherlands) Stephan Fransen (Netherlands) Wesley Koolhof; 6–4, 7–6^{(8–6)}	(Bosnia and Herzegovina) Tomislav Brkić (Croatia) Nikola Mektić	(Belarus) Egor Gerasimov (Croatia) Nikola Mektić	(Netherlands) Jesse Huta Galung (Serbia) Ivan Bjelica (Belarus) Dzmitry Zhyrmont (Belarus) Aliaksandr Bury
January 21	Great Britain F2 Futures (United Kingdom) Preston, United Kingdom; Hard (indoor) $10,000	(United Kingdom) Edward Corrie; 2–6, 6–3, 7–5	(United States) Christian Harrison	(United Kingdom) Marcus Willis (United Kingdom) George Morgan	(United Kingdom) Alexander Ward (United Kingdom) Sean Thornley (United Kingdom) Tom Farquharson (United Kingdom) Daniel Evans
January 21	Great Britain F2 Futures (United Kingdom) Preston, United Kingdom; Hard (indoor) $10,000	(United Kingdom) Ken Skupski (United Kingdom) Neal Skupski; 3–6, 6–3, [10–5]	(Republic of Ireland) Sam Barry (Republic of Ireland) Colin O'Brien	(United Kingdom) Marcus Willis (United Kingdom) George Morgan	(United Kingdom) Alexander Ward (United Kingdom) Sean Thornley (United Kingdom) Tom Farquharson (United Kingdom) Daniel Evans
January 21	Israel F2 Futures; Eilat, Israel; Hard $10,000	(Czech Republic) Jiří Veselý; 6–2, 6–4	(Republic of Ireland) James McGee	(Czech Republic) Adam Pavlásek (Slovakia) Jozef Kovalík	(Czech Republic) Michal Konečný (Spain) Guillermo Olaso (Poland) Adam Chadaj (Italy) Claudio Grassi
January 21	Israel F2 Futures; Eilat, Israel; Hard $10,000	(Czech Republic) Roman Jebavý (Czech Republic) Jiří Veselý; 6–4, 7–5	(Italy) Matteo Fago (Italy) Claudio Grassi	(Czech Republic) Adam Pavlásek (Slovakia) Jozef Kovalík	(Czech Republic) Michal Konečný (Spain) Guillermo Olaso (Poland) Adam Chadaj (Italy) Claudio Grassi
January 21	Mexico F1 Futures; Ixtapa, Mexico; Hard $10,000	(Mexico) Miguel Gallardo Valles; 4–6, 6–4, 6–1	(France) Antoine Benneteau	(Australia) Matheson Klein (Greece) Theodoros Angelinos	(United States) Andrew Carter (Guatemala) Christopher Díaz Figueroa (France) Laurent Malouli (Mexico) César Ramírez
January 21	Mexico F1 Futures; Ixtapa, Mexico; Hard $10,000	(Barbados) Darian King (Australia) Chris Letcher; 6–3, 6–1	(Greece) Theodoros Angelinos (France) Antoine Benneteau	(Australia) Matheson Klein (Greece) Theodoros Angelinos	(United States) Andrew Carter (Guatemala) Christopher Díaz Figueroa (France) Laurent Malouli (Mexico) César Ramírez
January 21	Turkey F3 Futures; Antalya-Kaya Belek, Turkey; Hard $10,000	(Spain) Pablo Carreño Busta; 6–3, 6–2	(Croatia) Toni Androić	(Ukraine) Artem Smirnov (Egypt) Mohamed Safwat	(Brazil) Augusto Laranja (China) Chang Yu (Croatia) Dino Marcan (United States) Nicolas Meister
January 21	Turkey F3 Futures; Antalya-Kaya Belek, Turkey; Hard $10,000	(Spain) Pablo Carreño Busta (Spain) Gerard Granollers Pujol; 7–6^{(7–4)}, 6–4	(Russia) Vitaliy Kachanovskiy (Russia) Andrei Levine	(Ukraine) Artem Smirnov (Egypt) Mohamed Safwat	(Brazil) Augusto Laranja (China) Chang Yu (Croatia) Dino Marcan (United States) Nicolas Meister
January 21	USA F3 Futures (United States) Weston, United States; Clay $10,000	(United States) Bjorn Fratangelo; 6–4, 3–6, 6–0	(Belgium) Arthur De Greef	(Romania) Victor Crivoi (United States) Robby Ginepri	(Czech Republic) Marek Michalička (Brazil) Thales Turini (Brazil) Daniel Dutra da Silva (Italy) Enrico Burzi
January 21	USA F3 Futures (United States) Weston, United States; Clay $10,000	(Brazil) Daniel Dutra da Silva (Brazil) Caio Zampieri; 7–6^{(7–4)}, 6–2	(United States) Sekou Bangoura (United States) Patrick Daciek	(Romania) Victor Crivoi (United States) Robby Ginepri	(Czech Republic) Marek Michalička (Brazil) Thales Turini (Brazil) Daniel Dutra da Silva (Italy) Enrico Burzi
January 28	France F3 Futures; Feucherolles, France; Hard (indoor) $10,000+H	(France) David Guez; 6–0, 6–1	(France) Constant Lestienne	(Netherlands) Matwé Middelkoop (France) Nicolas Renavand	(France) Élie Rousset (Spain) Enrique López Pérez (France) Mathieu Rodrigues (Belgium) Niels Desein
January 28	France F3 Futures; Feucherolles, France; Hard (indoor) $10,000+H	(Serbia) Nikola Ćaćić (Serbia) Miljan Zekić; 3–6, 7–5, [10–8]	(Netherlands) Stephan Fransen (Netherlands) Wesley Koolhof	(Netherlands) Matwé Middelkoop (France) Nicolas Renavand	(France) Élie Rousset (Spain) Enrique López Pérez (France) Mathieu Rodrigues (Belgium) Niels Desein
January 28	Germany F4 Futures; Nussloch, Germany; Carpet (indoor) $15,000	(Germany) Stefan Seifert; 4–6, 7–6^{(7–4)}, 6–4	(Germany) Bastian Knittel	(Germany) Nils Langer (Germany) Andreas Beck	(France) Franck Pepe (Sweden) Andreas Vinciguerra (Germany) Christian Hirschmüller (Germany) Kevin Krawietz
January 28	Germany F4 Futures; Nussloch, Germany; Carpet (indoor) $15,000	(Germany) Bastian Knittel (Austria) Philipp Oswald; 6–2, 7–5	(Serbia) Ivan Bjelica (Netherlands) Sander Groen	(Germany) Nils Langer (Germany) Andreas Beck	(France) Franck Pepe (Sweden) Andreas Vinciguerra (Germany) Christian Hirschmüller (Germany) Kevin Krawietz
January 28	Great Britain F3 Futures (United Kingdom) Sheffield, United Kingdom; Hard (indoor) $10,000	(United States) Christian Harrison; 6–4, 2–6, 7–6^{(7–5)}	(United Kingdom) Edward Corrie	(United Kingdom) David Rice (United Kingdom) Daniel Smethurst	(Sweden) Patrik Rosenholm (United Kingdom) Richard Bloomfield (United Kingdom) Joshua Ward-Hibbert (Sweden) Robin Olin
January 28	Great Britain F3 Futures (United Kingdom) Sheffield, United Kingdom; Hard (indoor) $10,000	(United Kingdom) David Rice (United Kingdom) Sean Thornley; 6–2, 7–6^{(8–6)}	(United Kingdom) Daniel Evans (United Kingdom) Andrew Fitzpatrick	(United Kingdom) David Rice (United Kingdom) Daniel Smethurst	(Sweden) Patrik Rosenholm (United Kingdom) Richard Bloomfield (United Kingdom) Joshua Ward-Hibbert (Sweden) Robin Olin
January 28	Israel F3 Futures; Eilat, Israel; Hard $10,000	(Belgium) Yannick Vandenbulcke; 6–1, 4–6, 7–6^{(7–5)}	(Italy) Claudio Grassi	(Czech Republic) Michal Konečný (Czech Republic) Roman Jebavý	(Czech Republic) Adam Pavlásek (Italy) Marco Cecchinato (Slovakia) Norbert Gombos (France) Axel Michon
January 28	Israel F3 Futures; Eilat, Israel; Hard $10,000	(Czech Republic) Roman Jebavý (Czech Republic) Libor Salaba; 4–6, 7–6^{(7–4)}, [10–3]	(Italy) Omar Giacalone (Italy) Claudio Grassi	(Czech Republic) Michal Konečný (Czech Republic) Roman Jebavý	(Czech Republic) Adam Pavlásek (Italy) Marco Cecchinato (Slovakia) Norbert Gombos (France) Axel Michon
January 28	Mexico F2 Futures; Tijuana, Mexico; Hard $15,000	(Colombia) Nicolás Barrientos; 5–7, 6–3, 7–5	(France) Antoine Benneteau	(United States) Ernesto Escobedo (Australia) Matheson Klein	(Mexico) Miguel Gallardo Valles (United States) Tyler Hochwalt (France) Laurent Malouli (United States) Oscar Fabian Matthews
January 28	Mexico F2 Futures; Tijuana, Mexico; Hard $15,000	(Greece) Theodoros Angelinos (France) Antoine Benneteau; 7–5, 6–4	(United States) Adam El Mihdawy (Australia) Chris Letcher	(United States) Ernesto Escobedo (Australia) Matheson Klein	(Mexico) Miguel Gallardo Valles (United States) Tyler Hochwalt (France) Laurent Malouli (United States) Oscar Fabian Matthews
January 28	Turkey F4 Futures; Antalya-Belconti, Turkey; Hard $10,000	(Chinese Taipei) Huang Liang-chi; 2–6, 6–4, 6–3	(Spain) Gerard Granollers Pujol	(Ukraine) Artem Smirnov (Germany) Steven Moneke	(China) Ouyang Bowen (China) Chang Yu (Slovenia) Nik Razboršek (Serbia) Denis Bejtulahi
January 28	Turkey F4 Futures; Antalya-Belconti, Turkey; Hard $10,000	(Ukraine) Artem Smirnov (Ukraine) Volodymyr Uzhylovskyi; 6–2, 6–4	(China) Chang Yu (China) Gao Xin	(Ukraine) Artem Smirnov (Germany) Steven Moneke	(China) Ouyang Bowen (China) Chang Yu (Slovenia) Nik Razboršek (Serbia) Denis Bejtulahi
January 28	USA F4 Futures (United States) Palm Coast, United States; Clay $10,000	(Belgium) Arthur De Greef; 6–2, 6–3	(United States) Bjorn Fratangelo	(France) Florian Reynet (Chile) Júlio Peralta	(United States) Jason Jung (Brazil) Caio Zampieri (United States) Spencer Papa (Spain) Juan Lizariturry
January 28	USA F4 Futures (United States) Palm Coast, United States; Clay $10,000	(United States) Jean-Yves Aubone (United States) Joey Burkhardt; 6–4, 6–3	(United States) Kevin King (United States) Vahid Mirzadeh	(France) Florian Reynet (Chile) Júlio Peralta	(United States) Jason Jung (Brazil) Caio Zampieri (United States) Spencer Papa (Spain) Juan Lizariturry

=== February ===
Week of	Tournament	Winner	Runners-up	Semifinalists	Quarterfinalists
February 4	Great Britain F4 Futures (United Kingdom) Wirral, United Kingdom; Hard (indoor) $10,000	(United Kingdom) Edward Corrie; 6–4, 6–1	(United Kingdom) Daniel Smethurst	(United Kingdom) Josh Goodall (United Kingdom) Joshua Milton	(United Kingdom) Alexander Ward (Finland) Timo Nieminen (United Kingdom) Robert Carter (France) Constant Lestienne
February 4	Great Britain F4 Futures (United Kingdom) Wirral, United Kingdom; Hard (indoor) $10,000	(United Kingdom) Lewis Burton (United Kingdom) Neal Skupski; 7–6^{(7–5)}, 2–6, [10–7]	(Republic of Ireland) James Cluskey (United Kingdom) Sean Thornley	(United Kingdom) Josh Goodall (United Kingdom) Joshua Milton	(United Kingdom) Alexander Ward (Finland) Timo Nieminen (United Kingdom) Robert Carter (France) Constant Lestienne
February 4	Mexico F3 Futures; Mexico City, Mexico; Hard $15,000	(Japan) Yoshihito Nishioka; 6–2, 7–6^{(7–4)}	(El Salvador) Marcelo Arévalo	(Mexico) Miguel Gallardo Valles (Moldova) Roman Borvanov	(Greece) Theodoros Angelinos (Mexico) Miguel Ángel Reyes-Varela (Mexico) Daniel Garza (France) Gianni Mina
February 4	Mexico F3 Futures; Mexico City, Mexico; Hard $15,000	(Colombia) Nicolás Barrientos (Guatemala) Christopher Díaz Figueroa; 7–5, 7–6^{(8–6)}	(Moldova) Roman Borvanov (United States) Adam El Mihdawy	(Mexico) Miguel Gallardo Valles (Moldova) Roman Borvanov	(Greece) Theodoros Angelinos (Mexico) Miguel Ángel Reyes-Varela (Mexico) Daniel Garza (France) Gianni Mina
February 4	Spain F1 Futures; Mallorca, Spain; Clay $10,000	(Spain) Pablo Carreño Busta; 6–1, 6–1	(Italy) Alessio di Mauro	(Spain) Pol Toledo Bagué (Colombia) Cristian Rodríguez	(Spain) Adam Sanjurjo Hermida (Slovakia) Jozef Kovalík (Austria) Gerald Melzer (France) Samuel Bensoussan
February 4	Spain F1 Futures; Mallorca, Spain; Clay $10,000	(Italy) Alessio di Mauro (Italy) Simone Vagnozzi; 6–0, 6–3	(Spain) Miguel Ángel López Jaén (Spain) Jordi Marse-Vidri	(Spain) Pol Toledo Bagué (Colombia) Cristian Rodríguez	(Spain) Adam Sanjurjo Hermida (Slovakia) Jozef Kovalík (Austria) Gerald Melzer (France) Samuel Bensoussan
February 4	Turkey F5 Futures; Antalya-Belconti, Turkey; Hard $10,000	(Germany) Steven Moneke; 6–2, 6–3	(France) Mathias Bourgue	(China) Gong Maoxin (China) Chang Yu	(Russia) Valery Rudnev (France) Alexis Musialek (Spain) Jordi Samper Montaña (Spain) Gerard Granollers Pujol
February 4	Turkey F5 Futures; Antalya-Belconti, Turkey; Hard $10,000	(China) Chang Yu (Chinese Taipei) Huang Liang-chi; 6–1, 4–6, [10–6]	(United States) Reid Carleton (France) Alexis Musialek	(China) Gong Maoxin (China) Chang Yu	(Russia) Valery Rudnev (France) Alexis Musialek (Spain) Jordi Samper Montaña (Spain) Gerard Granollers Pujol
February 11	Australia F1 Futures; Melbourne, Australia; Hard $15,000	(France) Stéphane Robert; 7–6^{(7–3)}, 6–3	(Australia) James Duckworth	(New Zealand) Michael Venus (Australia) Alex Bolt	(Australia) Nick Kyrgios (Italy) Andrea Arnaboldi (Australia) Greg Jones (Australia) Matt Reid
February 11	Australia F1 Futures; Melbourne, Australia; Hard $15,000	(Australia) Alex Bolt (Australia) Nick Kyrgios; 7–6^{(8–6)}, 6–4	(Australia) Ryan Agar (Austria) Sebastian Bader	(New Zealand) Michael Venus (Australia) Alex Bolt	(Australia) Nick Kyrgios (Italy) Andrea Arnaboldi (Australia) Greg Jones (Australia) Matt Reid
February 11	Croatia F1 Futures; Zagreb, Croatia; Hard (indoor) $15,000	(Bosnia and Herzegovina) Damir Džumhur; 6–2, 7–5	(Italy) Marco Cecchinato	(Czech Republic) Michal Konečný (Switzerland) Sandro Ehrat	(Austria) Martin Fischer (Bosnia and Herzegovina) Mirza Bašić (Croatia) Toni Androić (Croatia) Nikola Mektić
February 11	Croatia F1 Futures; Zagreb, Croatia; Hard (indoor) $15,000	(Croatia) Toni Androić (Croatia) Dino Marcan; 6–3, 6–3	(Croatia) Franco Škugor (Croatia) Joško Topić	(Czech Republic) Michal Konečný (Switzerland) Sandro Ehrat	(Austria) Martin Fischer (Bosnia and Herzegovina) Mirza Bašić (Croatia) Toni Androić (Croatia) Nikola Mektić
February 11	Mexico F4 Futures; Tehuacán, Mexico; Hard $10,000	(Mexico) Miguel Ángel Reyes-Varela; 6–4, 1–6, 6–2	(France) Gianni Mina	(Mexico) Eduardo Peralta-Tello (Moldova) Roman Borvanov	(Guatemala) Christopher Díaz Figueroa (Australia) Chris Letcher (United States) Michael Shabaz (Greece) Theodoros Angelinos
February 11	Mexico F4 Futures; Tehuacán, Mexico; Hard $10,000	(Moldova) Roman Borvanov (Guatemala) Christopher Díaz Figueroa; 7–6^{(7–2)}, 6–2	(Mexico) Alan Núñez Aguilera (Mexico) Miguel Ángel Reyes-Varela	(Mexico) Eduardo Peralta-Tello (Moldova) Roman Borvanov	(Guatemala) Christopher Díaz Figueroa (Australia) Chris Letcher (United States) Michael Shabaz (Greece) Theodoros Angelinos
February 11	Spain F2 Futures; Mallorca, Spain; Clay $10,000	(Spain) Pablo Carreño Busta; 6–3, 5–7, 6–1	(Japan) Taro Daniel	(Spain) Marc Giner (Italy) Walter Trusendi	(Slovakia) Jozef Kovalík (Algeria) Lamine Ouahab (Austria) Gerald Melzer (Spain) Pol Toledo Bagué
February 11	Spain F2 Futures; Mallorca, Spain; Clay $10,000	(Japan) Taro Daniel (Venezuela) David Souto; Walkover	(Slovakia) Jozef Kovalík (Czech Republic) Lukáš Maršoun	(Spain) Marc Giner (Italy) Walter Trusendi	(Slovakia) Jozef Kovalík (Algeria) Lamine Ouahab (Austria) Gerald Melzer (Spain) Pol Toledo Bagué
February 11	Turkey F6 Futures; Antalya-Belconti, Turkey; Hard $10,000	(Spain) Jordi Samper Montaña; 5–7, 6–2, 6–3	(Serbia) Danilo Petrović	(China) Chang Yu (United States) Reid Carleton	(Turkey) Marsel İlhan (Chinese Taipei) Yang Tsung-hua (Ukraine) Denys Mylokostov (Austria) Maximilian Neuchrist
February 11	Turkey F6 Futures; Antalya-Belconti, Turkey; Hard $10,000	(Chinese Taipei) Chen Ti (Japan) Hiroki Kondo; 6–0, 6–2	(China) Chang Yu (China) Li Zhe	(China) Chang Yu (United States) Reid Carleton	(Turkey) Marsel İlhan (Chinese Taipei) Yang Tsung-hua (Ukraine) Denys Mylokostov (Austria) Maximilian Neuchrist
February 18	Australia F2 Futures; Mildura, Australia; Grass $15,000	(Australia) Samuel Groth; 6–1, 6–4	(Australia) James Lemke	(Japan) Hiroki Moriya (Australia) Alex Bolt	(Slovakia) Ivo Klec (Australia) Luke Saville (Italy) Andrea Arnaboldi (Australia) Brydan Klein
February 18	Australia F2 Futures; Mildura, Australia; Grass $15,000	(Australia) Samuel Groth (Australia) John-Patrick Smith; 6–3, 6–4	(Australia) Colin Ebelthite (South Africa) Ruan Roelofse	(Japan) Hiroki Moriya (Australia) Alex Bolt	(Slovakia) Ivo Klec (Australia) Luke Saville (Italy) Andrea Arnaboldi (Australia) Brydan Klein
February 18	Croatia F2 Futures; Zagreb, Croatia; Hard (indoor) $15,000	(France) Jules Marie; 6–2, 2–6, 6–2	(Slovakia) Adrian Sikora	(Austria) Martin Fischer (Germany) Kevin Krawietz	(Lithuania) Laurynas Grigelis (Czech Republic) Jaroslav Pospíšil (Croatia) Toni Androić (Bosnia and Herzegovina) Damir Džumhur
February 18	Croatia F2 Futures; Zagreb, Croatia; Hard (indoor) $15,000	(Austria) Martin Fischer (Czech Republic) Jaroslav Pospíšil; 4–6, 6–2, [10–6]	(Croatia) Marin Draganja (Croatia) Nikola Mektić	(Austria) Martin Fischer (Germany) Kevin Krawietz	(Lithuania) Laurynas Grigelis (Czech Republic) Jaroslav Pospíšil (Croatia) Toni Androić (Bosnia and Herzegovina) Damir Džumhur
February 18	Kazakhstan F1 Futures; Aktobe, Kazakhstan; Hard (indoor) $15,000	(China) Zhang Ze; 6–2, 6–7^{(6–8)}, 6–1	(Slovakia) Marek Semjan	(Slovakia) Norbert Gombos (Russia) Victor Baluda	(Kazakhstan) Denis Yevseyev (China) Gong Maoxin (Belarus) Dzmitry Zhyrmont (Russia) Kirill Dmitriev
February 18	Kazakhstan F1 Futures; Aktobe, Kazakhstan; Hard (indoor) $15,000	(Russia) Alexander Kudryavtsev (Kazakhstan) Yuri Schukin; 7–6^{(8–6)}, 6–2	(Russia) Victor Baluda (Croatia) Mate Pavić	(Slovakia) Norbert Gombos (Russia) Victor Baluda	(Kazakhstan) Denis Yevseyev (China) Gong Maoxin (Belarus) Dzmitry Zhyrmont (Russia) Kirill Dmitriev
February 18	Portugal F1 Futures; Vale do Lobo, Portugal; Hard $10,000	(Belgium) Niels Desein; 7–6^{(7–3)}, 6–2	(Portugal) Pedro Sousa	(Belgium) Germain Gigounon (Portugal) Andre Gaspar Murta	(France) Julien Obry (Portugal) Rui Machado (Republic of Ireland) Sam Barry (Portugal) Leonardo Tavares
February 18	Portugal F1 Futures; Vale do Lobo, Portugal; Hard $10,000	(Portugal) Gonçalo Falcão (Portugal) Pedro Sousa; 6–3, 6–4	(Spain) Juan-Samuel Araúzo-Martínez (Spain) Jaime Pulgar-García	(Belgium) Germain Gigounon (Portugal) Andre Gaspar Murta	(France) Julien Obry (Portugal) Rui Machado (Republic of Ireland) Sam Barry (Portugal) Leonardo Tavares
February 18	Russia F1 Futures; Moscow, Russia; Hard (indoor) $15,000	(Russia) Konstantin Kravchuk; 6–4, 5–7, 6–4	(Latvia) Andis Juška	(Ukraine) Oleksandr Nedovyesov (Netherlands) Boy Westerhof	(Belarus) Egor Gerasimov (Russia) Alexey Vatutin (Belarus) Siarhei Betau (Czech Republic) Roman Jebavý
February 18	Russia F1 Futures; Moscow, Russia; Hard (indoor) $15,000	(Latvia) Andis Juška (Russia) Konstantin Kravchuk; 6–4, 3–6, [10–6]	(Belarus) Aliaksandr Bury (Belarus) Nikolai Fidirko	(Ukraine) Oleksandr Nedovyesov (Netherlands) Boy Westerhof	(Belarus) Egor Gerasimov (Russia) Alexey Vatutin (Belarus) Siarhei Betau (Czech Republic) Roman Jebavý
February 18	Spain F3 Futures; Murcia, Spain; Clay $10,000	(Spain) Pablo Carreño Busta; 6–7^{(7–9)}, 6–3, 6–3	(Spain) Roberto Carballés Baena	(Brazil) Nicolas Santos (Algeria) Lamine Ouahab	(Bulgaria) Alexandar Lazov (Italy) Enrico Burzi (Italy) Daniele Giorgini (France) Florian Reynet
February 18	Spain F3 Futures; Murcia, Spain; Clay $10,000	(Italy) Alberto Brizzi (Italy) Daniele Giorgini; 6–4, 3–6, [10–8]	(Spain) Samuel Corraliza-Moreno (Spain) Alberto Galiano-Hernández	(Brazil) Nicolas Santos (Algeria) Lamine Ouahab	(Bulgaria) Alexandar Lazov (Italy) Enrico Burzi (Italy) Daniele Giorgini (France) Florian Reynet
February 18	Turkey F7 Futures; Antalya-Belconti, Turkey; Hard $10,000	(Belgium) Yannik Reuter; 7–6^{(7–4)}, 3–6, 6–2	(Moldova) Radu Albot	(Chinese Taipei) Yang Tsung-hua (China) Chang Yu	(Bulgaria) Dimitar Kuzmanov (Croatia) Duje Kekez (Czech Republic) Dušan Lojda (France) Alexis Musialek
February 18	Turkey F7 Futures; Antalya-Belconti, Turkey; Hard $10,000	(China) Chang Yu (China) Li Zhe; 7–5, 3–6, [11–9]	(Croatia) Mate Delić (Serbia) Ilija Vučić	(Chinese Taipei) Yang Tsung-hua (China) Chang Yu	(Bulgaria) Dimitar Kuzmanov (Croatia) Duje Kekez (Czech Republic) Dušan Lojda (France) Alexis Musialek
February 18	Ukraine F1 Futures; Cherkasy, Ukraine; Hard (indoor) $10,000	(Poland) Grzegorz Panfil; 6–3, 6–3	(Ukraine) Marat Deviatiarov	(Poland) Andriej Kapaś (Latvia) Mārtiņš Podžus	(Italy) Erik Crepaldi (Moldova) Maxim Dubarenco (Italy) Alessandro Bega (Ukraine) Stanislav Poplavskyy
February 18	Ukraine F1 Futures; Cherkasy, Ukraine; Hard (indoor) $10,000	(Moldova) Maxim Dubarenco (Ukraine) Vladyslav Manafov; 6–3, 6–4	(Ukraine) Artem Smirnov (Ukraine) Volodymyr Uzhylovskyi	(Poland) Andriej Kapaś (Latvia) Mārtiņš Podžus	(Italy) Erik Crepaldi (Moldova) Maxim Dubarenco (Italy) Alessandro Bega (Ukraine) Stanislav Poplavskyy
February 18	USA F5 Futures (United States) Brownsville, United States; Hard $15,000	(South Africa) Rik de Voest; 7–6^{(8–6)}, 6–1	(Republic of Ireland) James McGee	(United Kingdom) Daniel Cox (Czech Republic) Jiří Veselý	(France) Pierre-Hugues Herbert (South Africa) Fritz Wolmarans (United States) Eric Quigley (United States) Bjorn Fratangelo
February 18	USA F5 Futures (United States) Brownsville, United States; Hard $15,000	(United States) Jean-Yves Aubone (United States) Dennis Nevolo; 6–3, 6–7^{(7–9)}, [10–6]	(Philippines) Ruben Gonzales (Australia) Chris Letcher	(United Kingdom) Daniel Cox (Czech Republic) Jiří Veselý	(France) Pierre-Hugues Herbert (South Africa) Fritz Wolmarans (United States) Eric Quigley (United States) Bjorn Fratangelo
February 25	Colombia F1 Futures; Pereira, Colombia; Clay $15,000	(Colombia) Carlos Salamanca; 6–3, 6–4	(Greece) Theodoros Angelinos	(Germany) Gero Kretschmer (Colombia) Eduardo Struvay	(Chile) Cristóbal Saavedra Corvalán (Colombia) Michael Quintero (El Salvador) Marcelo Arévalo (Argentina) Mateo Nicolás Martínez
February 25	Colombia F1 Futures; Pereira, Colombia; Clay $15,000	(Germany) Gero Kretschmer (Germany) Alex Satschko; 6–4, 6–4	(Greece) Theodoros Angelinos (El Salvador) Marcelo Arévalo	(Germany) Gero Kretschmer (Colombia) Eduardo Struvay	(Chile) Cristóbal Saavedra Corvalán (Colombia) Michael Quintero (El Salvador) Marcelo Arévalo (Argentina) Mateo Nicolás Martínez
February 25	Great Britain F5 Futures (United Kingdom) Cardiff, United Kingdom; Hard (indoor) $10,000	(Denmark) Frederik Nielsen; 6–4, 6–2	(United Kingdom) Edward Corrie	(United Kingdom) Richard Gabb (United Kingdom) Lewis Burton	(United Kingdom) Jack Findel-Hawkins (United Kingdom) Alexander Ward (United Kingdom) Tom Farquharson (United Kingdom) Jack Carpenter
February 25	Great Britain F5 Futures (United Kingdom) Cardiff, United Kingdom; Hard (indoor) $10,000	(United Kingdom) David Rice (United Kingdom) Sean Thornley; 6–1, 7–5	(United Kingdom) Edward Corrie (United Kingdom) Neal Skupski	(United Kingdom) Richard Gabb (United Kingdom) Lewis Burton	(United Kingdom) Jack Findel-Hawkins (United Kingdom) Alexander Ward (United Kingdom) Tom Farquharson (United Kingdom) Jack Carpenter
February 25	India F1 Futures; Chennai, India; Clay $10,000	(Romania) Victor Crivoi; 7–6^{(7–3)}, 7–5	(India) Jeevan Nedunchezhiyan	(Brazil) Thales Turini (France) Tak Khunn Wang	(India) Elwin Antony (India) Ranjeet Virali-Murugesan (India) Vijay Sundar Prashanth (India) Vijayant Malik
February 25	India F1 Futures; Chennai, India; Clay $10,000	(Japan) Arata Onozawa (India) Arun-Prakash Rajagopalan; 6–4, 0–6, [10–7]	(India) Sriram Balaji (India) Jeevan Nedunchezhiyan	(Brazil) Thales Turini (France) Tak Khunn Wang	(India) Elwin Antony (India) Ranjeet Virali-Murugesan (India) Vijay Sundar Prashanth (India) Vijayant Malik
February 25	Israel F4 Futures; Netanya, Israel; Hard $10,000	(Austria) Dennis Novak; 6–2, 6–3	(Germany) Stefan Seifert	(Germany) Robin Kern (Italy) Claudio Grassi	(Netherlands) Miliaan Niesten (Czech Republic) Michal Schmid (Switzerland) Yann Marti (France) Martin Vaïsse
February 25	Israel F4 Futures; Netanya, Israel; Hard $10,000	(Italy) Claudio Grassi (Netherlands) Miliaan Niesten; 6–3, 6–7^{(1–7)}, [10–2]	(Austria) Nicolas Reissig (Germany) Sebastian Wagner	(Germany) Robin Kern (Italy) Claudio Grassi	(Netherlands) Miliaan Niesten (Czech Republic) Michal Schmid (Switzerland) Yann Marti (France) Martin Vaïsse
February 25	Kazakhstan F2 Futures; Aktobe, Kazakhstan; Hard (indoor) $15,000	(Slovakia) Marek Semjan; 6–3, 6–7^{(5–7)}, 6–2	(China) Zhang Ze	(Russia) Alexander Kudryavtsev (Kazakhstan) Evgeny Korolev	(China) Gong Maoxin (Croatia) Mate Pavić (Slovakia) Norbert Gombos (Russia) Aslan Karatsev
February 25	Kazakhstan F2 Futures; Aktobe, Kazakhstan; Hard (indoor) $15,000	(Russia) Victor Baluda (Croatia) Mate Pavić; 6–2, 6–3	(China) Gong Maoxin (China) Zhang Ze	(Russia) Alexander Kudryavtsev (Kazakhstan) Evgeny Korolev	(China) Gong Maoxin (Croatia) Mate Pavić (Slovakia) Norbert Gombos (Russia) Aslan Karatsev
February 25	Portugal F2 Futures; Loulé, Portugal; Hard $10,000	(Portugal) Pedro Sousa; 5–7, 6–4, 7–6^{(7–3)}	(Portugal) Rui Machado	(Sweden) Elias Ymer (Belgium) Niels Desein	(France) Tristan Lamasine (Germany) Steven Moneke (France) Rudy Coco (Brazil) Carlos Eduardo Severino
February 25	Portugal F2 Futures; Loulé, Portugal; Hard $10,000	(Spain) Iván Arenas-Gualda (Spain) Enrique López Pérez; 6–7^{(2–7)}, 7–6^{(7–5)}, [10–4]	(Republic of Ireland) Sam Barry (Republic of Ireland) Colin O'Brien	(Sweden) Elias Ymer (Belgium) Niels Desein	(France) Tristan Lamasine (Germany) Steven Moneke (France) Rudy Coco (Brazil) Carlos Eduardo Severino
February 25	Russia F2 Futures; Yoshkar-Ola, Russia; Hard (indoor) $15,000	(Netherlands) Boy Westerhof; 1–6, 6–2, 6–4	(Russia) Konstantin Kravchuk	(Belarus) Siarhei Betau (Belarus) Egor Gerasimov	(Russia) Alexey Vatutin (Russia) Sergey Strelkov (Belarus) Nikolai Fidirko (Netherlands) Antal van der Duim
February 25	Russia F2 Futures; Yoshkar-Ola, Russia; Hard (indoor) $15,000	(Netherlands) Antal van der Duim (Netherlands) Boy Westerhof; 7–6^{(10–8)}, 6–3	(Belarus) Egor Gerasimov (Belarus) Andrei Vasilevski	(Belarus) Siarhei Betau (Belarus) Egor Gerasimov	(Russia) Alexey Vatutin (Russia) Sergey Strelkov (Belarus) Nikolai Fidirko (Netherlands) Antal van der Duim
February 25	Spain F4 Futures; Cartagena, Spain; Clay $10,000	(Spain) Pablo Carreño Busta; 6–1, 6–0	(Spain) Roberto Carballés Baena	(Spain) Jordi Samper Montaña (United Kingdom) Kyle Edmund	(Italy) Walter Trusendi (France) Maxime Chazal (Spain) David Pérez Sanz (France) Florian Reynet
February 25	Spain F4 Futures; Cartagena, Spain; Clay $10,000	(Spain) Gerard Granollers Pujol (Spain) Jordi Samper Montaña; 6–2, 6–2	(Spain) Miguel Ángel López Jaén (Spain) Jordi Marse-Vidri	(Spain) Jordi Samper Montaña (United Kingdom) Kyle Edmund	(Italy) Walter Trusendi (France) Maxime Chazal (Spain) David Pérez Sanz (France) Florian Reynet
February 25	Turkey F8 Futures; Antalya-Kaya Belek, Turkey; Hard $10,000	(Moldova) Radu Albot; 6–1, 6–4	(United States) Reid Carleton	(Czech Republic) Michal Konečný (Switzerland) Michael Lammer	(Chinese Taipei) Chen Ti (Sweden) Robin Olin (Sweden) Markus Eriksson (Croatia) Mate Delić
February 25	Turkey F8 Futures; Antalya-Kaya Belek, Turkey; Hard $10,000	(Chinese Taipei) Chen Ti (China) Gao Wan; 7–6^{(7–3)}, 6–3	(Czech Republic) Michal Konečný (Slovakia) Michal Pažický	(Czech Republic) Michal Konečný (Switzerland) Michael Lammer	(Chinese Taipei) Chen Ti (Sweden) Robin Olin (Sweden) Markus Eriksson (Croatia) Mate Delić
February 25	Ukraine F2 Futures; Cherkasy, Ukraine; Hard (indoor) $10,000	(Ukraine) Artem Smirnov; 7–6^{(7–2)}, 6–2	(Moldova) Maxim Dubarenco	(Czech Republic) Jan Šátral (Ukraine) Ivan Anikanov	(Belgium) Joris De Loore (Serbia) Nikola Ćaćić (Ukraine) Volodymyr Uzhylovskyi (Slovakia) Filip Horanský
February 25	Ukraine F2 Futures; Cherkasy, Ukraine; Hard (indoor) $10,000	(Moldova) Maxim Dubarenco (Ukraine) Vladyslav Manafov; 6–1, 6–4	(Belgium) Joris De Loore (Belgium) Jeroen Vanneste	(Czech Republic) Jan Šátral (Ukraine) Ivan Anikanov	(Belgium) Joris De Loore (Serbia) Nikola Ćaćić (Ukraine) Volodymyr Uzhylovskyi (Slovakia) Filip Horanský
February 25	USA F6 Futures (United States) Harlingen, United States; Hard $15,000	(Czech Republic) Jiří Veselý; 5–7, 7–6^{(7–4)}, 6–3	(United States) Bjorn Fratangelo	(Japan) Yoshihito Nishioka (South Korea) Nam Ji-sung	(South Africa) Dean O'Brien (United States) Christian Harrison (Germany) Moritz Baumann (Germany) Tim Pütz
February 25	USA F6 Futures (United States) Harlingen, United States; Hard $15,000	(Philippines) Ruben Gonzales (Australia) Chris Letcher; 6–2, 6–3	(United States) Kevin King (South Africa) Dean O'Brien	(Japan) Yoshihito Nishioka (South Korea) Nam Ji-sung	(South Africa) Dean O'Brien (United States) Christian Harrison (Germany) Moritz Baumann (Germany) Tim Pütz

=== March ===
Week of	Tournament	Winner	Runners-up	Semifinalists	Quarterfinalists
March 4	Canada F1 Futures; Gatineau, Canada; Hard (indoor) $15,000	(Germany) Tim Pütz; 6–2, 6–4	(United States) Austin Krajicek	(Canada) Érik Chvojka (United Kingdom) Jamie Baker	(Canada) Peter Polansky (United States) Nicholas Edlefsen (Bosnia and Herzegovina) Aldin Šetkić (United States) Adam El Mihdawy
March 4	Canada F1 Futures; Gatineau, Canada; Hard (indoor) $15,000	(Germany) Moritz Baumann (Germany) Tim Pütz; 7–6^{(7–0)}, 6–1	(United States) Adam El Mihdawy (Canada) Peter Polansky	(Canada) Érik Chvojka (United Kingdom) Jamie Baker	(Canada) Peter Polansky (United States) Nicholas Edlefsen (Bosnia and Herzegovina) Aldin Šetkić (United States) Adam El Mihdawy
March 4	Colombia F2 Futures; Bogotá, Colombia; Clay $15,000	(Colombia) Carlos Salamanca; 7–6^{(7–3)}, 7–6^{(7–2)}	(Italy) Gianluigi Quinzi	(Colombia) Eduardo Struvay (Greece) Theodoros Angelinos	(Italy) Thomas Fabbiano (Colombia) Nicolás Barrientos (Colombia) Daniel Elahi Galán (Dominican Republic) José Hernández
March 4	Colombia F2 Futures; Bogotá, Colombia; Clay $15,000	(Germany) Gero Kretschmer (Germany) Alex Satschko; 7–6^{(10–8)}, 6–3	(Argentina) Maximiliano Estévez (Dominican Republic) José Hernández	(Colombia) Eduardo Struvay (Greece) Theodoros Angelinos	(Italy) Thomas Fabbiano (Colombia) Nicolás Barrientos (Colombia) Daniel Elahi Galán (Dominican Republic) José Hernández
March 4	Croatia F3 Futures; Umag, Croatia; Clay $10,000	(Italy) Marco Cecchinato; 6–4, 6–2	(Hungary) Attila Balázs	(Germany) Marc Sieber (Italy) Riccardo Bellotti	(United Kingdom) Kyle Edmund (Slovenia) Nik Razboršek (Italy) Francesco Borgo (Romania) Petru-Alexandru Luncanu
March 4	Croatia F3 Futures; Umag, Croatia; Clay $10,000	(Austria) Gibril Diarra (Croatia) Joško Topić; 6–4, 6–3	(Germany) Kevin Krawietz (Germany) Marc Sieber	(Germany) Marc Sieber (Italy) Riccardo Bellotti	(United Kingdom) Kyle Edmund (Slovenia) Nik Razboršek (Italy) Francesco Borgo (Romania) Petru-Alexandru Luncanu
March 4	France F4 Futures; Lille, France; Hard (indoor) $15,000	(Serbia) Ilija Bozoljac; 6–4, 3–6, 6–3	(France) Nicolas Renavand	(Netherlands) Jesse Huta Galung (Belgium) Yannick Mertens	(France) Constant Lestienne (Serbia) Ivan Bjelica (France) Constantin Belot (France) Romain Jouan
March 4	France F4 Futures; Lille, France; Hard (indoor) $15,000	(France) Jonathan Eysseric (France) Nicolas Renavand; 6–7^{(3–7)}, 7–6^{(7–5)}, [10–5]	(United Kingdom) Lewis Burton (Republic of Ireland) James Cluskey	(Netherlands) Jesse Huta Galung (Belgium) Yannick Mertens	(France) Constant Lestienne (Serbia) Ivan Bjelica (France) Constantin Belot (France) Romain Jouan
March 4	Great Britain F6 Futures (United Kingdom) Shrewsbury, United Kingdom; Hard (indoor) $10,000	(United Kingdom) Daniel Evans; 7–6^{(7–3)}, 7–6^{(7–1)}	(United Kingdom) Marcus Willis	(United Kingdom) Josh Goodall (United Kingdom) Edward Corrie	(Finland) Timo Nieminen (Finland) Juho Paukku (United Kingdom) Neal Skupski (United Kingdom) George Coupland
March 4	Great Britain F6 Futures (United Kingdom) Shrewsbury, United Kingdom; Hard (indoor) $10,000	(United Kingdom) David Rice (United Kingdom) Sean Thornley; 6–2, 6–1	(Belgium) Sander Gillé (Belgium) Jonas Merckx	(United Kingdom) Josh Goodall (United Kingdom) Edward Corrie	(Finland) Timo Nieminen (Finland) Juho Paukku (United Kingdom) Neal Skupski (United Kingdom) George Coupland
March 4	India F2 Futures; Madurai, India; Clay $10,000	(Romania) Victor Crivoi; 6–1, 6–1	(India) Vijay Sundar Prashanth	(Italy) Filippo Leonardi (India) Jeevan Nedunchezhiyan	(Germany) Tom Schönenberg (Italy) Claudio Fortuna (India) Vijayant Malik (France) Tak Khunn Wang
March 4	India F2 Futures; Madurai, India; Clay $10,000	(Brazil) Caio Silva (India) Ranjeet Virali-Murugesan; 6–4, 2–6, [11–9]	(Romania) Patrick Ciorcilă (Romania) Victor Crivoi	(Italy) Filippo Leonardi (India) Jeevan Nedunchezhiyan	(Germany) Tom Schönenberg (Italy) Claudio Fortuna (India) Vijayant Malik (France) Tak Khunn Wang
March 4	Israel F5 Futures; Netanya, Israel; Hard $10,000	(France) Alexis Musialek; 6–4, 6–3	(France) Martin Vaïsse	(Netherlands) Colin van Beem (Netherlands) Miliaan Niesten	(Chinese Taipei) Chen Ti (France) Thomas Grinberg (Hungary) Viktor Filipenkó (Czech Republic) Michal Schmid
March 4	Israel F5 Futures; Netanya, Israel; Hard $10,000	(Hungary) Viktor Filipenkó (Hungary) Levente Gödry; 6–4, 4–6, [10–5]	(Greece) Alexandros Jakupovic (Czech Republic) Michal Schmid	(Netherlands) Colin van Beem (Netherlands) Miliaan Niesten	(Chinese Taipei) Chen Ti (France) Thomas Grinberg (Hungary) Viktor Filipenkó (Czech Republic) Michal Schmid
March 4	Portugal F3 Futures; Faro, Portugal; Hard $10,000	(Portugal) Rui Machado; 7–6^{(7–3)}, 6–2	(Spain) Guillermo Olaso	(France) Jules Marie (Spain) Enrique López Pérez	(United Kingdom) Matthew Short (Spain) Ricardo Villacorta-Alonso (France) Kevin Botti (France) Laurent Malouli
March 4	Portugal F3 Futures; Faro, Portugal; Hard $10,000	(Spain) Juan-Samuel Araúzo-Martínez (Spain) Jaime Pulgar-García; 6–2, 2–6, [10–2]	(Spain) Iván Arenas-Gualda (Spain) Enrique López Pérez	(France) Jules Marie (Spain) Enrique López Pérez	(United Kingdom) Matthew Short (Spain) Ricardo Villacorta-Alonso (France) Kevin Botti (France) Laurent Malouli
March 4	Spain F5 Futures; Reus, Spain; Clay $10,000	(Spain) Jordi Samper Montaña; 6–2, 6–2	(Spain) Marc Giner	(Venezuela) Ricardo Rodriguez (Italy) Enrico Burzi	(Spain) Ricardo Ojeda Lara (Spain) Gerard Granollers Pujol (Spain) Albert Alcaraz-Ivorra (Spain) Oriol Roca Batalla
March 4	Spain F5 Futures; Reus, Spain; Clay $10,000	(Spain) Gerard Granollers Pujol (Spain) Jordi Samper Montaña; 6–7^{(5–7)}, 7–6^{(7–3)}, [10–4]	(Venezuela) Jordi Muñoz Abreu (Spain) Andoni Vivanco-Guzmán	(Venezuela) Ricardo Rodriguez (Italy) Enrico Burzi	(Spain) Ricardo Ojeda Lara (Spain) Gerard Granollers Pujol (Spain) Albert Alcaraz-Ivorra (Spain) Oriol Roca Batalla
March 4	Switzerland F1 Futures; Frauenfeld, Switzerland; Carpet (indoor) $10,000	(Italy) Edoardo Eremin; 5–7, 6–4, 7–6^{(7–2)}	(France) Antoine Benneteau	(Switzerland) Sandro Ehrat (Germany) Bastian Wagner	(Germany) Bastian Knittel (Belgium) Julien Dubail (Austria) Martin Fischer (Germany) George von Massow
March 4	Switzerland F1 Futures; Frauenfeld, Switzerland; Carpet (indoor) $10,000	(Belgium) Julien Dubail (France) Yannick Jankovits; 6–3, 6–2	(Austria) Martin Fischer (Switzerland) Jannis Liniger	(Switzerland) Sandro Ehrat (Germany) Bastian Wagner	(Germany) Bastian Knittel (Belgium) Julien Dubail (Austria) Martin Fischer (Germany) George von Massow
March 4	Turkey F9 Futures; Antalya-Kaya Belek, Turkey; Hard $10,000	(Moldova) Radu Albot; 6–3, 3–6, 7–6^{(9–7)}	(Turkey) Marsel İlhan	(Czech Republic) Michal Konečný (China) Li Zhe	(Australia) Gavin van Peperzeel (Italy) Lorenzo Giustino (United States) Reid Carleton (Brazil) Tiago Fernandes
March 4	Turkey F9 Futures; Antalya-Kaya Belek, Turkey; Hard $10,000	(China) Gao Peng (China) Gao Wan; 6–4, 6–4	(Brazil) Eduardo Dischinger (Brazil) Tiago Fernandes	(Czech Republic) Michal Konečný (China) Li Zhe	(Australia) Gavin van Peperzeel (Italy) Lorenzo Giustino (United States) Reid Carleton (Brazil) Tiago Fernandes
March 4	Ukraine F3 Futures; Cherkasy, Ukraine; Hard (indoor) $10,000	(Ukraine) Artem Smirnov; 7–6^{(7–2)}, 3–6, 7–6^{(7–2)}	(Ukraine) Oleksandr Nedovyesov	(Russia) Mikhail Biryukov (Ukraine) Volodymyr Uzhylovskyi	(Moldova) Maxim Dubarenco (Czech Republic) Otakar Lucák (Ukraine) Ivan Anikanov (Belarus) Yaraslav Shyla
March 4	Ukraine F3 Futures; Cherkasy, Ukraine; Hard (indoor) $10,000	(Moldova) Maxim Dubarenco (Ukraine) Vladyslav Manafov; 6–3, 6–4	(Ukraine) Artem Smirnov (Ukraine) Volodymyr Uzhylovskyi	(Russia) Mikhail Biryukov (Ukraine) Volodymyr Uzhylovskyi	(Moldova) Maxim Dubarenco (Czech Republic) Otakar Lucák (Ukraine) Ivan Anikanov (Belarus) Yaraslav Shyla
March 11	Canada F2 Futures; Sherbrooke, Canada; Hard (indoor) $15,000	(United States) Austin Krajicek; 6–4, 3–6, 6–2	(Germany) Moritz Baumann	(Canada) Érik Chvojka (Bosnia and Herzegovina) Aldin Šetkić	(Canada) Peter Polansky (United States) Eric Quigley (Canada) Filip Peliwo (South Africa) Rik de Voest
March 11	Canada F2 Futures; Sherbrooke, Canada; Hard (indoor) $15,000	(United States) Chase Buchanan (United States) Austin Krajicek; 6–3, 6–2	(Mexico) Daniel Garza (United States) Vahid Mirzadeh	(Canada) Érik Chvojka (Bosnia and Herzegovina) Aldin Šetkić	(Canada) Peter Polansky (United States) Eric Quigley (Canada) Filip Peliwo (South Africa) Rik de Voest
March 11	Croatia F4 Futures; Poreč, Croatia; Clay $10,000	(Czech Republic) Jaroslav Pospíšil; 6–2, 6–1	(Bulgaria) Tihomir Grozdanov	(Italy) Salvatore Caruso (Slovakia) Filip Horanský	(Italy) Daniele Giorgini (Slovakia) Miloslav Mečíř (Croatia) Borut Puc (Hungary) Attila Balázs
March 11	Croatia F4 Futures; Poreč, Croatia; Clay $10,000	(Italy) Alberto Brizzi (Italy) Daniele Giorgini; 1–6, 7–5, [10–7]	(Bolivia) Hugo Dellien (Chile) Felipe Ríos	(Italy) Salvatore Caruso (Slovakia) Filip Horanský	(Italy) Daniele Giorgini (Slovakia) Miloslav Mečíř (Croatia) Borut Puc (Hungary) Attila Balázs
March 11	France F5 Futures; Poitiers, France; Hard (indoor) $15,000+H	(France) Romain Jouan; 6–3, 6–0	(France) David Guez	(France) Nicolas Mahut (France) Nicolas Renavand	(France) Jonathan Eysseric (France) Maxime Quinqueneau (France) Dorian Descloix (Latvia) Andis Juška
March 11	France F5 Futures; Poitiers, France; Hard (indoor) $15,000+H	(Latvia) Andis Juška (Germany) Gero Kretschmer; 7–5, 6–3	(Serbia) Ivan Bjelica (Netherlands) Sander Groen	(France) Nicolas Mahut (France) Nicolas Renavand	(France) Jonathan Eysseric (France) Maxime Quinqueneau (France) Dorian Descloix (Latvia) Andis Juška
March 11	Great Britain F7 Futures (United Kingdom) Bath, United Kingdom; Hard (indoor) $10,000	(United Kingdom) Edward Corrie; 6–3, 7–6^{(7–4)}	(United Kingdom) Daniel Evans	(United Kingdom) Tom Farquharson (United Kingdom) David Rice	(United Kingdom) Richard Gabb (France) Lucas Pouille (Netherlands) Antal van der Duim (United Kingdom) Marcus Willis
March 11	Great Britain F7 Futures (United Kingdom) Bath, United Kingdom; Hard (indoor) $10,000	(United Kingdom) Lewis Burton (United Kingdom) Daniel Evans; 5–7, 6–1, [10–5]	(Czech Republic) Jan Minář (Slovakia) Marek Semjan	(United Kingdom) Tom Farquharson (United Kingdom) David Rice	(United Kingdom) Richard Gabb (France) Lucas Pouille (Netherlands) Antal van der Duim (United Kingdom) Marcus Willis
March 11	India F3 Futures; Trichy, India; Clay $10,000	(France) Tak Khunn Wang; 6–3, 6–0	(Romania) Patrick Ciorcilă	(Italy) Filippo Leonardi (Brazil) Thales Turini	(India) Vijay Sundar Prashanth (Germany) Mats Moraing (India) Ranjeet Virali-Murugesan (Brazil) Augusto Laranja
March 11	India F3 Futures; Trichy, India; Clay $10,000	(Brazil) Caio Silva (India) Ranjeet Virali-Murugesan; 6–3, 6–1	(Brazil) Augusto Laranja (Brazil) Thales Turini	(Italy) Filippo Leonardi (Brazil) Thales Turini	(India) Vijay Sundar Prashanth (Germany) Mats Moraing (India) Ranjeet Virali-Murugesan (Brazil) Augusto Laranja
March 11	Israel F6 Futures; Netanya, Israel; Hard $10,000	(Chinese Taipei) Chen Ti; 6–4, 6–3	(Austria) Maximilian Neuchrist	(Israel) Amir Weintraub (Netherlands) Wesley Koolhof	(Israel) Igor Smilansky (Germany) Stefan Seifert (Netherlands) Stephan Fransen (Netherlands) Miliaan Niesten
March 11	Israel F6 Futures; Netanya, Israel; Hard $10,000	(Chinese Taipei) Chen Ti (Austria) Maximilian Neuchrist; 7–5, 6–3	(France) Jérôme Inzerillo (France) Alexis Musialek	(Israel) Amir Weintraub (Netherlands) Wesley Koolhof	(Israel) Igor Smilansky (Germany) Stefan Seifert (Netherlands) Stephan Fransen (Netherlands) Miliaan Niesten
March 11	Japan F1 Futures; Nishi-Tama, Japan; Hard $10,000	(Japan) Hiroki Kondo; 7–5, 6–1	(Chinese Taipei) Huang Liang-chi	(Japan) Toshihide Matsui (Japan) Yasutaka Uchiyama	(South Korea) Oh Dae-soung (Slovakia) Adrian Sikora (Japan) Shuichi Sekiguchi (South Korea) Na Jung-woong
March 11	Japan F1 Futures; Nishi-Tama, Japan; Hard $10,000	(Japan) Shuichi Sekiguchi (Slovakia) Adrian Sikora; 6–3, 6–4	(Japan) Yuuya Kibi (Japan) Hiromasa Oku	(Japan) Toshihide Matsui (Japan) Yasutaka Uchiyama	(South Korea) Oh Dae-soung (Slovakia) Adrian Sikora (Japan) Shuichi Sekiguchi (South Korea) Na Jung-woong
March 11	Portugal F4 Futures; Guimarães, Portugal; Hard $10,000	(France) Jules Marie; 6–4, 3–6, 6–4	(Portugal) Leonardo Tavares	(Portugal) Rui Machado (Republic of Ireland) Colin O'Brien	(Republic of Ireland) Daniel Glancy (Portugal) Gonçalo Falcão (Portugal) João Domingues (Spain) Guillermo Olaso
March 11	Portugal F4 Futures; Guimarães, Portugal; Hard $10,000	(Republic of Ireland) Sam Barry (Republic of Ireland) Colin O'Brien; 6–1, 6–1	(Portugal) Gonçalo Pereira (Portugal) Danyal Sualehe	(Portugal) Rui Machado (Republic of Ireland) Colin O'Brien	(Republic of Ireland) Daniel Glancy (Portugal) Gonçalo Falcão (Portugal) João Domingues (Spain) Guillermo Olaso
March 11	Spain F6 Futures; Badalona, Spain; Clay $10,000	(Spain) Pablo Carreño Busta; 2–6, 6–1, 7–6^{(9–7)}	(Spain) Jordi Samper Montaña	(Spain) Pere Riba (Spain) Roberto Carballés Baena	(Japan) Taro Daniel (Spain) Gerard Granollers Pujol (Venezuela) Ricardo Rodriguez (United States) Will Gray
March 11	Spain F6 Futures; Badalona, Spain; Clay $10,000	(Spain) Miguel Ángel López Jaén (Spain) Jordi Marse-Vidri; 3–6, 6–4, [13–11]	(Spain) Jaume Pla Malfeito (Spain) Pol Toledo Bagué	(Spain) Pere Riba (Spain) Roberto Carballés Baena	(Japan) Taro Daniel (Spain) Gerard Granollers Pujol (Venezuela) Ricardo Rodriguez (United States) Will Gray
March 11	Switzerland F2 Futures (Liechtenstein) Vaduz, Liechtenstein; Carpet (indoor) $10,000	(Switzerland) Stéphane Bohli; 6–3, 3–6, 7–6^{(7–5)}	(Italy) Edoardo Eremin	(Lithuania) Laurynas Grigelis (Germany) Andreas Beck	(France) Hugo Nys (France) Yannick Jankovits (Switzerland) Alexander Sadecky (Austria) Martin Fischer
March 11	Switzerland F2 Futures (Liechtenstein) Vaduz, Liechtenstein; Carpet (indoor) $10,000	(Italy) Edoardo Eremin (Italy) Matteo Volante; 6–1, 6–4	(Switzerland) Luca Castelnuovo (Austria) Martin Fischer	(Lithuania) Laurynas Grigelis (Germany) Andreas Beck	(France) Hugo Nys (France) Yannick Jankovits (Switzerland) Alexander Sadecky (Austria) Martin Fischer
March 11	Turkey F10 Futures; Antalya-Alibey Manavgat, Turkey; Clay $10,000	(Italy) Lorenzo Giustino; 6–0, 6–3	(Italy) Simone Vagnozzi	(Austria) Lukas Jastraunig (France) Florian Reynet	(United States) Reid Carleton (Egypt) Mohamed Safwat (Sweden) Christian Lindell (Bulgaria) Valentin Dimov
March 11	Turkey F10 Futures; Antalya-Alibey Manavgat, Turkey; Clay $10,000	(Sweden) Jesper Brunström (Sweden) Markus Eriksson; 6–3, 6–1	(Russia) Andrei Plotniy (Kazakhstan) Denis Yevseyev	(Austria) Lukas Jastraunig (France) Florian Reynet	(United States) Reid Carleton (Egypt) Mohamed Safwat (Sweden) Christian Lindell (Bulgaria) Valentin Dimov
March 11	USA F7 Futures (United States) Calabasas, United States; Hard $15,000	(India) Sanam Singh; 6–3, 1–6, 7–6^{(7–3)}	(United States) Bradley Klahn	(United States) Kevin King (South Korea) Cho Min-hyeok	(Tunisia) Mohamed Haythem Abid (Brazil) Caio Zampieri (Barbados) Darian King (Zimbabwe) Takanyi Garanganga
March 11	USA F7 Futures (United States) Calabasas, United States; Hard $15,000	(India) Saketh Myneni (India) Sanam Singh; 6–7^{(3–7)}, 6–2, [14–12]	(South Korea) Lim Yong-kyu (South Korea) Nam Ji-sung	(United States) Kevin King (South Korea) Cho Min-hyeok	(Tunisia) Mohamed Haythem Abid (Brazil) Caio Zampieri (Barbados) Darian King (Zimbabwe) Takanyi Garanganga
March 18	Australia F4 Futures; Ipswich, Australia; Hard $15,000	(Australia) Colin Ebelthite; 6–4, 6–7^{(7–9)}, 6–2	(Australia) Jonathon Cooper	(New Zealand) José Statham (Australia) Jordan Thompson	(New Zealand) Artem Sitak (Australia) James Lemke (Australia) Michael Look (Australia) Ryan Agar
March 18	Australia F4 Futures; Ipswich, Australia; Hard $15,000	(New Zealand) Artem Sitak (New Zealand) José Statham; 6–3, 6–1	(Australia) Jacob Grills (Australia) Dane Propoggia	(New Zealand) José Statham (Australia) Jordan Thompson	(New Zealand) Artem Sitak (Australia) James Lemke (Australia) Michael Look (Australia) Ryan Agar
March 18	Croatia F5 Futures; Rovinj, Croatia; Clay $10,000	(Slovakia) Miloslav Mečíř; 5–5 Ret.	(Austria) Dominic Thiem	(Portugal) Pedro Sousa (Croatia) Joško Topić	(Croatia) Duje Kekez (Austria) Nikolaus Moser (Austria) Marc Rath (Czech Republic) Jaroslav Pospíšil
March 18	Croatia F5 Futures; Rovinj, Croatia; Clay $10,000	(Bosnia and Herzegovina) Tomislav Brkić (Canada) Steven Diez; 6–2, 6–2	(Austria) Nikolaus Moser (Austria) Tristan-Samuel Weissborn	(Portugal) Pedro Sousa (Croatia) Joško Topić	(Croatia) Duje Kekez (Austria) Nikolaus Moser (Austria) Marc Rath (Czech Republic) Jaroslav Pospíšil
March 18	France F6 Futures; Saint-Raphaël, France; Hard (indoor) $10,000	(France) Fabrice Martin; 6–3, 6–2	(France) David Guez	(Madagascar) Antso Rakotondramanga (France) Mathieu Rodrigues	(France) Thomas Le Boulch (France) Romain Bauvy (France) Enzo Couacaud (Serbia) Nikola Ćirić
March 18	France F6 Futures; Saint-Raphaël, France; Hard (indoor) $10,000	(France) Romain Arneodo (France) Hugo Nys; 6–7^{(6–8)}, 6–4, [10–5]	(France) Simon Cauvard (France) Alexandre Penaud	(Madagascar) Antso Rakotondramanga (France) Mathieu Rodrigues	(France) Thomas Le Boulch (France) Romain Bauvy (France) Enzo Couacaud (Serbia) Nikola Ćirić
March 18	Great Britain F8 Futures (United Kingdom) Sunderland, United Kingdom; Hard (indoor) $10,000	(United Kingdom) Daniel Smethurst; 6–3, 6–4	(Czech Republic) Jan Minář	(United Kingdom) Josh Goodall (United Kingdom) Daniel Evans	(Netherlands) Scott Griekspoor (United Kingdom) Edward Corrie (Slovakia) Marek Semjan (United Kingdom) Alexander Ward
March 18	Great Britain F8 Futures (United Kingdom) Sunderland, United Kingdom; Hard (indoor) $10,000	(United Kingdom) Daniel Smethurst (United Kingdom) Alexander Ward; 7–5, 7–6^{(7–4)}	(United Kingdom) Lewis Burton (United Kingdom) Daniel Evans	(United Kingdom) Josh Goodall (United Kingdom) Daniel Evans	(Netherlands) Scott Griekspoor (United Kingdom) Edward Corrie (Slovakia) Marek Semjan (United Kingdom) Alexander Ward
March 18	Japan F2 Futures; Nishi Tokyo, Japan; Hard $10,000	(Japan) Sho Katayama; 6–1, 6–4	(Japan) Takeshi Endo	(Chinese Taipei) Huang Liang-chi (Japan) Hiroki Kondo	(Japan) Gengo Kikuchi (Japan) Takao Suzuki (Japan) Takuto Niki (Japan) Shintaro Imai
March 18	Japan F2 Futures; Nishi Tokyo, Japan; Hard $10,000	(Japan) Sho Katayama (Japan) Bumpei Sato; 7–6^{(7–4)}, 6–4	(Japan) Shota Tagawa (Japan) Yasutaka Uchiyama	(Chinese Taipei) Huang Liang-chi (Japan) Hiroki Kondo	(Japan) Gengo Kikuchi (Japan) Takao Suzuki (Japan) Takuto Niki (Japan) Shintaro Imai
March 18	Russia F3 Futures; Tyumen, Russia; Hard (indoor) $15,000	(Russia) Konstantin Kravchuk; 6–3, 4–6, 6–4	(Russia) Alexey Vatutin	(Russia) Valery Rudnev (Belarus) Dzmitry Zhyrmont	(Czech Republic) Michal Konečný (Belarus) Andrei Vasilevski (Russia) Mikhail Elgin (Belarus) Siarhei Betau
March 18	Russia F3 Futures; Tyumen, Russia; Hard (indoor) $15,000	(Belarus) Aliaksandr Bury (Russia) Mikhail Fufygin; 7–6^{(7–2)}, 6–3	(Estonia) Vladimir Ivanov (Belarus) Andrei Vasilevski	(Russia) Valery Rudnev (Belarus) Dzmitry Zhyrmont	(Czech Republic) Michal Konečný (Belarus) Andrei Vasilevski (Russia) Mikhail Elgin (Belarus) Siarhei Betau
March 18	Spain F7 Futures; Villajoyosa, Spain; Carpet $10,000	(Spain) Pablo Carreño Busta; 6–3, 6–7^{(3–7)}, 6–3	(Spain) Roberto Carballés Baena	(Spain) Arnau Brugués Davi (Algeria) Lamine Ouahab	(Venezuela) Ricardo Rodriguez (Japan) Taro Daniel (Spain) Roberto Ortega Olmedo (Spain) Mario Vilella Martínez
March 18	Spain F7 Futures; Villajoyosa, Spain; Carpet $10,000	(Spain) Jaime Pulgar-García (Spain) Andoni Vivanco-Guzmán; 3–6, 6–3, [10–3]	(Spain) Miguel Ángel López Jaén (Spain) Jordi Marse-Vidri	(Spain) Arnau Brugués Davi (Algeria) Lamine Ouahab	(Venezuela) Ricardo Rodriguez (Japan) Taro Daniel (Spain) Roberto Ortega Olmedo (Spain) Mario Vilella Martínez
March 18	Switzerland F3 Futures; Taverne, Switzerland; Carpet (indoor) $10,000	(Austria) Martin Fischer; 7–6^{(7–4)}, 6–1	(Lithuania) Laurynas Grigelis	(Switzerland) Stéphane Bohli (Germany) Andreas Beck	(Italy) Roberto Marcora (Switzerland) Adrien Bossel (Italy) Matteo Trevisan (Italy) Riccardo Sinicropi
March 18	Switzerland F3 Futures; Taverne, Switzerland; Carpet (indoor) $10,000	(Austria) Martin Fischer (Switzerland) Jannis Liniger; 6–4, 7–6^{(7–4)}	(Italy) Lorenzo Frigerio (Italy) Matteo Trevisan	(Switzerland) Stéphane Bohli (Germany) Andreas Beck	(Italy) Roberto Marcora (Switzerland) Adrien Bossel (Italy) Matteo Trevisan (Italy) Riccardo Sinicropi
March 18	Turkey F11 Futures; Antalya-Belconti, Turkey; Hard $10,000	(Spain) Gerard Granollers Pujol; 6–2, 6–0	(France) Jules Marie	(Turkey) Marsel İlhan (Italy) Lorenzo Giustino	(Benin) Alexis Klégou (Egypt) Mohamed Safwat (Spain) Guillermo Olaso (Sweden) Christian Lindell
March 18	Turkey F11 Futures; Antalya-Belconti, Turkey; Hard $10,000	(Spain) Gerard Granollers Pujol (Spain) Guillermo Olaso; 6–4, 6–1	(Sweden) Patrik Brydolf (Austria) Michael Linzer	(Turkey) Marsel İlhan (Italy) Lorenzo Giustino	(Benin) Alexis Klégou (Egypt) Mohamed Safwat (Spain) Guillermo Olaso (Sweden) Christian Lindell
March 18	USA F8 Futures (United States) Costa Mesa, United States; Hard $15,000	(United States) Bradley Klahn; 6–3, 6–3	(South Korea) Cho Min-hyeok	(South Korea) Nam Ji-sung (United States) Tennys Sandgren	(United States) Dennis Nevolo (United States) Nicolas Meister (Brazil) Caio Zampieri (United States) Jason Jung
March 18	USA F8 Futures (United States) Costa Mesa, United States; Hard $15,000	(United States) Michael McClune (New Zealand) Michael Venus; 6–1, 6–3	(South Korea) Cho Min-hyeok (South Korea) Nam Ji-sung	(South Korea) Nam Ji-sung (United States) Tennys Sandgren	(United States) Dennis Nevolo (United States) Nicolas Meister (Brazil) Caio Zampieri (United States) Jason Jung
March 25	Australia F5 Futures; Bundaberg, Australia; Clay $15,000	(Australia) James Duckworth; 7–6^{(11–9)}, 6–2	(Australia) Jason Kubler	(Australia) Dane Propoggia (New Zealand) José Statham	(Australia) Jordan Thompson (Australia) Michael Look (Australia) Colin Ebelthite (Australia) Gavin van Peperzeel
March 25	Australia F5 Futures; Bundaberg, Australia; Clay $15,000	(Australia) Dane Propoggia (New Zealand) José Statham; 6–3, 6–2	(Australia) Ryan Agar (Australia) Colin Ebelthite	(Australia) Dane Propoggia (New Zealand) José Statham	(Australia) Jordan Thompson (Australia) Michael Look (Australia) Colin Ebelthite (Australia) Gavin van Peperzeel
March 25	Bahrain F1 Futures; Manama, Bahrain; Hard $10,000	(Spain) Jordi Samper Montaña; 6–4, 4–6, 7–5	(Netherlands) Antal van der Duim	(Belgium) Jeroen Vanneste (Germany) Peter Heller	(Germany) Denis Gremelmayr (Germany) Dominik Schulz (Belgium) Joris De Loore (India) Ronak Manuja
March 25	Bahrain F1 Futures; Manama, Bahrain; Hard $10,000	(Switzerland) Riccardo Maiga (South Africa) Ruan Roelofse; 6–3, 6–3	(Colombia) Cristian Rodríguez (Spain) Jordi Samper Montaña	(Belgium) Jeroen Vanneste (Germany) Peter Heller	(Germany) Denis Gremelmayr (Germany) Dominik Schulz (Belgium) Joris De Loore (India) Ronak Manuja
March 25	Croatia F6 Futures; Vrsar, Croatia; Clay $10,000	(Austria) Dominic Thiem; 2–6, 6–3, 3–1 Ret.	(Spain) Pere Riba	(Latvia) Mārtiņš Podžus (Czech Republic) Jaroslav Pospíšil	(Croatia) Borut Puc (Austria) Tristan-Samuel Weissborn (Switzerland) Henri Laaksonen (Croatia) Mate Delić
March 25	Croatia F6 Futures; Vrsar, Croatia; Clay $10,000	(Bosnia and Herzegovina) Tomislav Brkić (Croatia) Mate Delić; 2–6, 7–6^{(7–3)}, [10–8]	(Czech Republic) Lukáš Maršoun (Czech Republic) Dominik Süč	(Latvia) Mārtiņš Podžus (Czech Republic) Jaroslav Pospíšil	(Croatia) Borut Puc (Austria) Tristan-Samuel Weissborn (Switzerland) Henri Laaksonen (Croatia) Mate Delić
March 25	Italy F1 Futures; Trento, Italy; Carpet (indoor) $15,000	(Bosnia and Herzegovina) Mirza Bašić; 7–6^{(7–4)}, 1–6, 6–2	(Italy) Matteo Trevisan	(Bulgaria) Valentin Dimov (Italy) Andrea Arnaboldi	(Serbia) Denis Bejtulahi (Italy) Lorenzo Frigerio (Italy) Roberto Marcora (Lithuania) Laurynas Grigelis
March 25	Italy F1 Futures; Trento, Italy; Carpet (indoor) $15,000	(Italy) Lorenzo Frigerio (Italy) Matteo Trevisan; 6–3, 6–4	(Italy) Francesco Borgo (Italy) Marco Bortolotti	(Bulgaria) Valentin Dimov (Italy) Andrea Arnaboldi	(Serbia) Denis Bejtulahi (Italy) Lorenzo Frigerio (Italy) Roberto Marcora (Lithuania) Laurynas Grigelis
March 25	Japan F3 Futures; Kōfu, Japan; Hard $10,000	(China) Chang Yu; 6–2, 6–1	(South Korea) Nam Hyun-woo	(Japan) Hiroyasu Ehara (Japan) Yasutaka Uchiyama	(South Korea) Seol Jae-min (Japan) Kaichi Uchida (Japan) Takuto Niki (Japan) Shuichi Sekiguchi
March 25	Japan F3 Futures; Kōfu, Japan; Hard $10,000	(Japan) Hiroki Kondo (Japan) Kento Takeuchi; 6–1, 3–6, [10–7]	(China) Chang Yu (South Korea) Kim Cheong-eui	(Japan) Hiroyasu Ehara (Japan) Yasutaka Uchiyama	(South Korea) Seol Jae-min (Japan) Kaichi Uchida (Japan) Takuto Niki (Japan) Shuichi Sekiguchi
March 25	Russia F4 Futures; Novokuznetsk, Russia; Hard (indoor) $15,000+H	(Russia) Konstantin Kravchuk; 6–4, 6–1	(Belarus) Siarhei Betau	(Russia) Alexey Vatutin (Russia) Aslan Karatsev	(Russia) Alexander Kudryavtsev (Russia) Andrey Kumantsov (Belarus) Andrei Vasilevski (Russia) Mikhail Vaks
March 25	Russia F4 Futures; Novokuznetsk, Russia; Hard (indoor) $15,000+H	(Belarus) Siarhei Betau (Russia) Mikhail Biryukov; 6–1, 7–6^{(7–3)}	(Russia) Mikhail Elgin (Russia) Alexander Kudryavtsev	(Russia) Alexey Vatutin (Russia) Aslan Karatsev	(Russia) Alexander Kudryavtsev (Russia) Andrey Kumantsov (Belarus) Andrei Vasilevski (Russia) Mikhail Vaks
March 25	Spain F8 Futures; Villajoyosa, Spain; Carpet $10,000	(Spain) Marc Giner; 7–6^{(7–4)}, 6–4	(Spain) Roberto Carballés Baena	(Venezuela) Ricardo Rodriguez (Japan) Taro Daniel	(Spain) Roberto Ortega Olmedo (Spain) José Checa Calvo (Algeria) Lamine Ouahab (Spain) Juan-Samuel Araúzo-Martínez
March 25	Spain F8 Futures; Villajoyosa, Spain; Carpet $10,000	(Spain) Oriol Roca Batalla (Spain) Andoni Vivanco-Guzmán; 6–0, 6–3	(Portugal) João Domingues (Spain) José Anton Salazar Martín	(Venezuela) Ricardo Rodriguez (Japan) Taro Daniel	(Spain) Roberto Ortega Olmedo (Spain) José Checa Calvo (Algeria) Lamine Ouahab (Spain) Juan-Samuel Araúzo-Martínez
March 25	Turkey F12 Futures; Antalya-Belconti, Turkey; Hard $10,000	(Turkey) Marsel İlhan; 6–2, 6–2	(Italy) Matteo Fago	(Egypt) Mohamed Safwat (Netherlands) Miliaan Niesten	(Dominican Republic) José Hernández (Spain) Guillermo Olaso (Croatia) Marin Bradarić (Brazil) Thiago Monteiro
March 25	Turkey F12 Futures; Antalya-Belconti, Turkey; Hard $10,000	(Argentina) Maximiliano Estévez (Brazil) Thiago Monteiro; 5–7, 6–2, [10–6]	(Russia) Kirill Dmitriev (Belarus) Yaraslav Shyla	(Egypt) Mohamed Safwat (Netherlands) Miliaan Niesten	(Dominican Republic) José Hernández (Spain) Guillermo Olaso (Croatia) Marin Bradarić (Brazil) Thiago Monteiro
March 25	Vietnam F1 Futures; Bạc Liêu City, Vietnam; Hard $10,000	(France) Laurent Recouderc; 0–6, 6–4, 7–6^{(7–4)}	(France) Lucas Pouille	(Indonesia) Christopher Rungkat (Czech Republic) Roman Jebavý	(France) Michael Bois (Germany) Torsten Wietoska (United Kingdom) Andrew Fitzpatrick (United Kingdom) Joshua Ward-Hibbert
March 25	Vietnam F1 Futures; Bạc Liêu City, Vietnam; Hard $10,000	(France) Tristan Lamasine (France) Laurent Lokoli; 6–4, 6–3	(Israel) Dekel Bar (Australia) Zach Itzstein	(Indonesia) Christopher Rungkat (Czech Republic) Roman Jebavý	(France) Michael Bois (Germany) Torsten Wietoska (United Kingdom) Andrew Fitzpatrick (United Kingdom) Joshua Ward-Hibbert
