= 2012 Beijing International Challenger – Men's doubles =

Men's doubles
- 2012 Beijing International Challenger

Final
- Champions: (Thailand) Sanchai Ratiwatana (Thailand) Sonchat Ratiwatana
- Runners-up: (India) Yuki Bhambri (India) Divij Sharan
- Score: 7–6^{(7–3)}, 2–6, [10–6]

Events
Singles	men	women
Doubles	men	women
← 2011 ·	Beijing International Challenger	· 2013 →

Sanchai Ratiwatana and Sonchat Ratiwatana successfully defended their title, defeating Yuki Bhambri and Divij Sharan 7–6^{(7–3)}, 2–6, [10–6] in the final.

== Seeds ==
1. (Thailand) Sanchai Ratiwatana / (Thailand) Sonchat Ratiwatana (champions)
2. (France) Pierre-Hugues Herbert / (Chinese Taipei) Lee Hsin-han (semifinals)
3. (Finland) Harri Heliövaara / (India) Purav Raja (quarterfinals)
4. (India) Yuki Bhambri / (India) Divij Sharan (final)

== Draw ==
=== Key ===
- Q = Qualifier
- WC = Wild card
- LL = Lucky loser
- Alt = Alternate
- SE = Special exempt
- PR = Protected ranking
- ITF = ITF entry
- JE = Junior exempt
- w/o = Walkover
- r = Retired
- d = Defaulted
- SR = Special ranking

=== Draw ===
First round
1	(Thailand) Sa Ratiwatana (Thailand) So Ratiwatana	6	3	[10]
(China) M Gong (China) Z Zhang	0	6	[6]
(Japan) H Kondo (Chinese Taipei) C-H Yi	6	6
(France) V Millot (France) J Ouanna	2	0
3	(Finland) H Heliövaara (India) P Raja	6	6
WC	(China) Gao Xin (China) Z Li	2	0
(Chinese Taipei) L-C Huang (Chinese Taipei) T-h Yang	6	3	[10]
(Australia) A Feeney (Australia) S Groth	3	6	[3]
(Austria) N Moser (South Africa) Ruan Roelofse	4	6	[10]
(Slovenia) A Bedene (Slovenia) G Žemlja	6	3	[6]
WC	(China) Y Chang (China) D Wu	5	7^{7}	[4]
4	(India) Y Bhambri (India) D Sharan	7	6^{5}	[10]
(Slovakia) K Beck (Kazakhstan) A Golubev	6	7^{7}
WC	(China) Gao Peng (China) W Gao	3	63
(Indonesia) C Rungkat (Japan) Y Sugita	4	6^{4}
2	(France) P-H Herbert (Chinese Taipei) H-H Lee	6	7^{7}

Quarterfinals
1	(Thailand) Sa Ratiwatana (Thailand) So Ratiwatana	7^{7}	6
(Japan) H Kondo (Chinese Taipei) C-H Yi	6^{3}	2
3	(Finland) H Heliövaara (India) P Raja	6	4	[6]
(Chinese Taipei) L-C Huang (Chinese Taipei) T-h Yang	4	6	[10]
(Austria) N Moser (South Africa) R Roelofse	5	2
4	(India) Y Bhambri (India) D Sharan	7	6
(Slovakia) K Beck (Kazakhstan) A Golubev	1	1
2	(France) P-H Herbert (Chinese Taipei) H-H Lee	6	6

Semifinals
1	(Thailand) Sa Ratiwatana (Thailand) So Ratiwatana	6	6
(Chinese Taipei) L-C Huang (Chinese Taipei) T-h Yang	3	2
4	(India) Y Bhambri (India) D Sharan	6	6
2	(France) P-H Herbert (Chinese Taipei) H-H Lee	4	1

Final
1	(Thailand) Sa Ratiwatana (Thailand) So Ratiwatana	7^{7}	2	[10]
4	(India) Y Bhambri (India) D Sharan	6^{3}	6	[6]
