= 2012 Beijing International Challenger =

- Date: 28 July – 5 August
- Edition: 3rd
- Surface: Hard
- Location: Beijing, China

Champions

Men's singles
- (Slovenia) Grega Žemlja

Women's singles
- (China) Wang Qiang

Men's doubles
- (Thailand) Sanchai Ratiwatana / (Thailand) Sonchat Ratiwatana

Women's doubles
- (China) Liu Wanting / (China) Sun Shengnan
| ← 2011 · | Beijing International Challenger | · 2013 → |

The 2012 Beijing International Challenger was a professional tennis tournament played on hard courts. It was the third edition of the tournament which was part of the 2012 ATP Challenger Tour and the 2012 ITF Women's Circuit. It took place in Beijing, China between 28 July and 5 August 2012.

== ATP singles main-draw entrants ==
=== Seeds ===
| Country | Player | Rank^{1} | Seed |
|---|---|---|---|
| SVN | Aljaž Bedene | 103 | 1 |
| SVN | Grega Žemlja | 110 | 2 |
| SVK | Karol Beck | 127 | 3 |
| KAZ | Andrey Golubev | 147 | 4 |
| TPE | Yang Tsung-hua | 165 | 5 |
| JPN | Yūichi Sugita | 169 | 6 |
| FRA | Josselin Ouanna | 178 | 7 |
| CHN | Zhang Ze | 181 | 8 |

- ^{1} Rankings are as of July 23, 2012.

=== Other entrants ===
The following players received wildcards into the singles main draw:

- (China) Chang Yu
- (China) Gong Maoxin
- (China) Ma Ya-Nan
- (China) Ouyang Bowen

The following players received entry from the qualifying draw:

- (Japan) Yuuya Kibi
- (South Korea) Lim Yong-kyu
- (Japan) Toshihide Matsui
- (Austria) Nikolaus Moser

== WTA entrants ==
=== Seeds ===
| Country | Player | Rank^{1} | Seed |
|---|---|---|---|
| FRA | Stéphanie Foretz Gacon | 83 | 1 |
| TPE | Chan Yung-jan | 115 | 2 |
| JPN | Kurumi Nara | 155 | 3 |
| CHN | Zhang Shuai | 158 | 4 |
| CHN | Zheng Saisai | 162 | 5 |
| POR | Maria João Koehler | 169 | 6 |
| THA | Noppawan Lertcheewakarn | 171 | 7 |
| JPN | Yurika Sema | 180 | 8 |

- ^{1} Rankings are as of July 23, 2012.

=== Other entrants ===
The following players received wildcards into the singles main draw:

- (China) Li Ting
- (China) Wang Yafan
- (China) Yang Zhaoxuan

The following players received entry from the qualifying draw:

- (Russia) Ksenia Lykina
- (China) Tang Hao Chen
- (China) Wen Xin
- (China) Zhou Yimiao

The following player received entry from A Lucky loser spot:

- (China) Liang Chen

== Champions ==
=== Men's singles ===
- (Slovenia) Grega Žemlja def. (China) Wu Di, 6–3, 6–0

=== Women's singles ===
- (China) Wang Qiang def. (Chinese Taipei) Chan Yung-jan, 6–2, 6–4

=== Men's doubles ===
- (Thailand) Sanchai Ratiwatana / (Thailand) Sonchat Ratiwatana def. (India) Yuki Bhambri / (India) Divij Sharan, 7–6^{(7–3)}, 2–6, [10–6]

=== Women's doubles ===
- (China) Liu Wanting / (China) Sun Shengnan def. (Chinese Taipei) Chan Chin-wei / (China) Han Xinyun, 5–7, 6–0, [10–7]
