= 2013 Beijing International Challenger – Women's singles =

Women's singles
- 2013 Beijing International Challenger

Final
- Champion: (China) Zhang Shuai
- Runner-up: (China) Zhou Yimiao
- Score: 6–2, 6–1

Events
Singles	men	women
Doubles	men	women
← 2012 ·	Beijing International Challenger	· 2014 →

Wang Qiang was the defending champion, having won the event in 2012, but she lost in the first round to Zhang Ling.

Zhang Shuai won the title, defeating Zhou Yimiao in the final, 6–2, 6–1.

== Seeds ==
1. (Japan) Misaki Doi (semifinals)
2. (China) Duan Yingying (first round)
3. (China) Zhang Shuai (champion)
4. (China) Zhou Yimiao (final)
5. (Russia) Daria Gavrilova (second round)
6. (China) Wang Qiang (first round)
7. (China) Zheng Saisai (semifinals)
8. (Japan) Yurika Sema (quarterfinals)

== Main draw ==
=== Key ===
- Q = Qualifier
- WC = Wild card
- LL = Lucky loser
- Alt = Alternate
- SE = Special exempt
- PR = Protected ranking
- ITF = ITF entry
- JE = Junior exempt
- w/o = Walkover
- r = Retired
- d = Defaulted
- SR = Special ranking

=== Finals ===
Semifinals
1	(Japan) Misaki Doi	1	6^{3}
3	(China) Zhang Shuai	6	7^{7}
4	(China) Zhou Yimiao	6	2
7	(China) Zheng Saisai	2	2^{r}

Final
3	(China) Zhang Shuai	6	6
4	(China) Zhou Yimiao	2	1

=== Top half ===
First round
1	(Japan) M Doi	2	6	6
(Japan) E Sema	6	2	4
WC	(China) F Xun	3	2
(Kazakhstan) Z Diyas	6	6
(Japan) E Hozumi	3	2
Q	(China) F Liu	6	6
(Hong Kong) L Zhang	4	6	6
6	(China) Q Wang	6	1	1
3	(China) S Zhang	6	6
(Uzbekistan) N Abduraimova	3	2
(Uzbekistan) S Sharipova	0	1
(Japan) R Ozaki	6	6
WC	(China) Y Wang	1	2
PR	(Netherlands) M Krajicek	6	6
LL	(China) H Tang	0	2
5	(Russia) D Gavrilova	6	6

Second round
1	(Japan) M Doi	5	6	6
(Kazakhstan) Z Diyas	7	2	3
Q	(China) F Liu	6	4	6
(Hong Kong) L Zhang	1	6	4
3	(China) S Zhang	6	6
(Japan) R Ozaki	3	1
PR	(Netherlands) M Krajicek	6	3	6
5	(Russia) D Gavrilova	3	6	4

Quarterfinals
1	(Japan) M Doi	6	6
Q	(China) F Liu	4	4
3	(China) S Zhang	6	6
PR	(Netherlands) M Krajicek	2	0

Semifinals
1	(Japan) M Doi	1	6^{3}
3	(China) S Zhang	6	7^{7}

=== Bottom half ===
First round
8	(Japan) Y Sema	6	6
(Japan) M Miyamura	2	1
(China) Z Yang	6	6
WC	(China) Q Ye	3	2
(Japan) J Namigata	5	2
(Chinese Taipei) C-w Chan	7	6
WC	(China) Z Yang	4	0
4	(China) Y Zhou	6	6
7	(China) S Zheng	7	6
Q	(South Korea) S-j Jang	5	1
Q	(China) W Liu	3	1
Q	(China) X Wen	6	6
LL	(China) X Zhou	6	6
(China) Y Zhang	4	4
(China) S Sun	6	6
2	(China) Y Duan	2	4

Second round
8	(Japan) Y Sema	7^{7}	6
(China) Z Yang	6^{4}	4
(Chinese Taipei) C-w Chan	1	3
4	(China) Y Zhou	6	6
7	(China) S Zheng	2	6	6
Q	(China) X Wen	6	2	1
LL	(China) X Zhou	6	2	6
(China) S Sun	2	6	1

Quarterfinals
8	(Japan) Y Sema	6^{6}	0
4	(China) Y Zhou	7^{8}	6
7	(China) S Zheng	6	6
LL	(China) X Zhou	3	2

Semifinals
4	(China) Y Zhou	6	2
7	(China) S Zheng	2	2^{r}
