= 2012 Beijing International Challenger – Men's singles =

Men's singles
- 2012 Beijing International Challenger

Final
- Champion: (Slovenia) Grega Žemlja
- Runner-up: (China) Wu Di
- Score: 6–3, 6–0

Events
Singles	men	women
Doubles	men	women
← 2011 ·	Beijing International Challenger	· 2013 →

Farrukh Dustov was the defending champion was beaten in the Second Round by Yuichi Sugita.
Grega Žemlja won the title, defeating Wu Di 6–3, 6–0 in the final.

== Seeds ==
1. (Slovenia) Aljaž Bedene (quarterfinals, retired due to left thigh injury)
2. (Slovenia) Grega Žemlja (champion)
3. (Slovakia) Karol Beck (semifinals)
4. (Kazakhstan) Andrey Golubev (semifinals)
5. (Chinese Taipei) Yang Tsung-hua (quarterfinals)
6. (Japan) Yuichi Sugita (quarterfinals)
7. (France) Josselin Ouanna (second round)
8. (China) Zhang Ze (second round)

== Draw ==
=== Key ===
- Q = Qualifier
- WC = Wild card
- LL = Lucky loser
- Alt = Alternate
- SE = Special exempt
- PR = Protected ranking
- ITF = ITF entry
- JE = Junior exempt
- w/o = Walkover
- r = Retired
- d = Defaulted
- SR = Special ranking

=== Finals ===
Semifinals
(China) Wu Di	6	3	6
4	(Kazakhstan) Andrey Golubev	1	6	1
3	(Slovakia) Karol Beck	4	4
2	(Slovenia) Grega Žemlja	6	6

Final
(China) Wu Di	3	0
2	(Slovenia) Grega Žemlja	6	6

=== Top half ===
First round
1	(Slovenia) A Bedene	4	7^{7}	6
(Switzerland) S Bohli	6	6^{5}	1
Q	(Austria) N Moser	6^{7}	4
(Indonesia) C Rungkat	7^{9}	6
(France) P-H Herbert	6^{2}	2
(China) D Wu	7^{7}	6
WC	(China) Y-N Ma	4	4
8	(China) Z Zhang	6	6
4	(Kazakhstan) A Golubev	4	6	6
WC	(China) M Gong	6	3	3
WC	(China) Ouyang Bowen	2	6	3
SE	(Australia) A Feeney	6	2	6
Q	(South Korea) Y Lim	3	2
(France) V Millot	6	6
(Australia) S Groth	4	6	4
7	(France) J Ouanna	6	4	6

Second round
1	(Slovenia) A Bedene	7	7^{7}
(Indonesia) C Rungkat	5	6^{3}
(China) D Wu	6	6
8	(China) Z Zhang	3	4
4	(Kazakhstan) A Golubev	4	6	6
SE	(Australia) A Feeney	6	2	3
(France) V Millot	7	7^{7}
7	(France) J Ouanna	6^{3}	5

Quarterfinals
1	(Slovenia) A Bedene	2^{r}
(China) D Wu	2
4	(Kazakhstan) A Golubev	7^{7}	6^{6}	6
(France) V Millot	6^{4}	7^{8}	4

Semifinals
(China) D Wu	6	3	6
4	(Kazakhstan) A Golubev	1	6	1

=== Bottom half ===
First round
5	(Chinese Taipei) T-h Yang	6	4	7^{9}
(Egypt) M Safwat	1	6	6^{7}
Q	(Japan) Yuuya Kibi	0	5
(Japan) Hiroki Moriya	6	7
(China) Y Bai	4	0
WC	(China) Y Chang	6	6
(Chinese Taipei) T Chen	2	1
3	(Slovakia) K Beck	6	6
6	(Japan) Y Sugita	7^{7}	6
Q	(Japan) T Matsui	6^{3}	4
(Uzbekistan) F Dustov	6	3	6
(France) Laurent Rochette	3	6	3
(Finland) H Heliövaara	5	4
(India) Y Bhambri	7	6
(China) Z Li	7	2	2
2	(Slovenia) G Žemlja	5	6	6

Second round
5	(Chinese Taipei) T-h Yang	6	6
(Japan) Hiroki Moriya	4	3
WC	(China) Y Chang	6	4	0
3	(Slovakia) K Beck	4	6	6
6	(Japan) Y Sugita	6	6
(Uzbekistan) F Dustov	3	3
(India) Y Bhambri	2	1
2	(Slovenia) G Žemlja	6	6

Quarterfinals
5	(Chinese Taipei) T-h Yang	5	4
3	(Slovakia) K Beck	7	6
6	(Japan) Y Sugita	6	4	2
2	(Slovenia) G Žemlja	4	6	6

Semifinals
3	(Slovakia) K Beck	4	4
2	(Slovenia) G Žemlja	6	6
