= 2013 Beijing International Challenger – Women's doubles =

Women's doubles
- 2013 Beijing International Challenger

Final
- Champions: (China) Liu Chang (China) Zhou Yimiao
- Runners-up: (Japan) Misaki Doi (Japan) Miki Miyamura
- Score: 7–6^{(7–1)}, 6–4

Events
Singles	men	women
Doubles	men	women
← 2012 ·	Beijing International Challenger	· 2014 →

Liu Wanting and Sun Shengnan were the defending champions, having won the event in 2012. Liu partnered up with Yang Zhaoxuan, but lost in the quarterfinals; Sun partnered up with Chan Chin-wei, but they lost in the semifinals.

Liu Chang and Zhou Yimiao won the title, defeating Misaki Doi and Miki Miyamura in the final, 7–6^{(7–1)}, 6–4.

== Seeds ==
1. (China) Xu Yifan / (China) Zheng Saisai (semifinals; withdrew)
2. (Chinese Taipei) Chan Chin-wei / (China) Sun Shengnan (semifinals)
3. (China) Tang Haochen / (China) Tian Ran (first round)
4. (China) Liu Wanting / (China) Yang Zhaoxuan (quarterfinals)

== Draw ==
=== Key ===
- Q = Qualifier
- WC = Wild card
- LL = Lucky loser
- Alt = Alternate
- SE = Special exempt
- PR = Protected ranking
- ITF = ITF entry
- JE = Junior exempt
- w/o = Walkover
- r = Retired
- d = Defaulted
- SR = Special ranking

First round
1	(China) Y Xu (China) S Zheng	4	6	[10]
(China) X Wen (China) Y Zhao	6	3	[8]
PR	(Kazakhstan) Z Diyas (Netherlands) M Krajicek	6	6
WC	(China) X Dong (China) Z Yan	3	2
3	(China) H Tang (China) R Tian	4	3
(Chinese Taipei) Y-h Lee (Thailand) N Wannasuk	6	6
(Chinese Taipei) S-y Kao (Hong Kong) L Zhang	6^{5}	2
(Japan) M Doi (Japan) M Miyamura	7^{7}	6
WC	(China) K Zhang (China) N Zhang	0	6	[7]
(China) C Liu (China) Y Zhou	6	3	[10]
(Japan) N Hibino (Japan) E Hozumi	6^{2}	3
4	(China) W Liu (China) Z Yang	7^{7}	6
(China) T Li (China) C Liang	1	6	[11]
(China) X Han (China) Q Ye	6	4	[13]
WC	(South Korea) S-j Jang (China) Z Yang	1	2
2	(Chinese Taipei) C-w Chan (China) S Sun	6	6

Quarterfinals
1	(China) Y Xu (China) S Zheng	5	6	[10]
PR	(Kazakhstan) Z Diyas (Netherlands) M Krajicek	7	4	[6]
(Chinese Taipei) Y-h Lee (Thailand) N Wannasuk	7	1	[8]
(Japan) M Doi (Japan) M Miyamura	5	6	[10]
(China) C Liu (China) Y Zhou	6	7
4	(China) W Liu (China) Z Yang	2	5
(China) X Han (China) Q Ye	1	5
2	(Chinese Taipei) C-w Chan (China) S Sun	6	7

Semifinals
1	(China) Y Xu (China) S Zheng
(Japan) M Doi (Japan) M Miyamura	w/o
(China) C Liu (China) Y Zhou	6	3	[10]
2	(Chinese Taipei) C-w Chan (China) S Sun	3	6	[7]

Final
(Japan) M Doi (Japan) M Miyamura	6^{1}	4
(China) C Liu (China) Y Zhou	7^{7}	6
