= 2013 Beijing International Challenger – Men's doubles =

Men's doubles
- 2013 Beijing International Challenger

Final
- Champions: (Japan) Toshihide Matsui (Thailand) Danai Udomchoke
- Runners-up: (China) Gong Maoxin (China) Zhang Ze
- Score: 4–6, 7–6^{(8–6)}, [10–8]

Events
| Singles | men | women |
| Doubles | men | women |
| ← 2012 · | Beijing International Challenger |

Sanchai Ratiwatana and Sonchat Ratiwatana are the defending champions, but decided not to participate.

Toshihide Matsui and Danai Udomchoke defeated the Chinese pairing of Gong Maoxin and Zhang Ze 4–6, 7–6^{(8–6)}, [10–8].

== Seeds ==
1. (New Zealand) Artem Sitak / (New Zealand) Jose Rubin Statham (first round)
2. (Serbia) Nikola Ćirić / (Czech Republic) Roman Jebavý (first round)
3. (Japan) Toshihide Matsui / (Thailand) Danai Udomchoke (champions)
4. (Japan) Hiroki Kondo / (India) Vishnu Vardhan (semifinals)

== Draw ==
=== Key ===
- Q = Qualifier
- WC = Wild card
- LL = Lucky loser
- Alt = Alternate
- SE = Special exempt
- PR = Protected ranking
- ITF = ITF entry
- JE = Junior exempt
- w/o = Walkover
- r = Retired
- d = Defaulted
- SR = Special ranking

First round
1 | (New Zealand) A Sitak (New Zealand) J Statham | 4 | 6 | [7]
(Italy) Erik Crepaldi (Spain) R Ortega Olmedo | 6 | 1 | [10]
(China) M Gong (China) Z Zhang | 6 | 6
WC | (China) S Liu (China) C Wang | 3 | 4
4 | (Japan) H Kondo (India) V Vardhan | 6 | 3 | [10]
(Australia) K Hensel (Australia) L Saville | 4 | 6 | [2]
(China) Chang Yu (China) Z Li | 6 | 6
(China) Gao Peng (China) Gao Wang | 4 | 3
(Japan) H Moriya (Japan) B Sato | 6 | 7
(China) X Gao (China) B Ouyang | 4 | 5
WC | (China) Cai Zhao (China) Feng He | 7^{7} | 4 | [8]
3 | (Japan) T Matsui (Thailand) D Udomchoke | 6^{4} | 6 | [10]
(Japan) Shuichi Sekiguchi (Japan) K Takeuchi | 6 | 1 | [5]
WC | (China) Li Yifeng (China) Xue Feng | 4 | 6 | [10]
(South Korea) W-s Jun (South Korea) J-w Na | 3 | 7^{7} | '[10]
2 | (Serbia) N Ćirić (Czech Republic) R Jebavý | 6 | 6^{3} | [3]

Quarterfinals
(Italy) E Crepaldi (Spain) R Ortega Olmedo | 6 | 5 | [8]
(China) M Gong (China) Z Zhang | 4 | 7 | [10]
4 | (Japan) H Kondo (India) V Vardhan | 6 | 6
(China) Y Chang (China) Z Li | 1 | 2
(Japan) H Moriya (Japan) B Sato | 3 | 2
3 | (Japan) T Matsui (Thailand) D Udomchoke | 6 | 6
WC | (China) Y Li (China) F Xue | 6 | 3 | [12]
(South Korea) W-s Jun (South Korea) J-w Na | 4 | 6 | [10]

Semifinals
(China) M Gong (China) Z Zhang | 3 | 6 | [13]
4 | (Japan) H Kondo (India) V Vardhan | 6 | 2 | [11]
3 | (Japan) T Matsui (Thailand) D Udomchoke | 2 | 6 | [10]
WC | (China) Y Li (China) F Xue | 6 | 4 | [7]

Final
(China) M Gong (China) Z Zhang | 6 | 6^{6} | [8]
3 | (Japan) T Matsui (Thailand) D Udomchoke | 4 | 7^{8} | [10]
