= 2013 Beijing International Challenger =

- Date: 8–14 July
- Edition: 4th
- Draw: 32S / 16D
- Prize money: $75,000
- Surface: Hard
- Location: Beijing, China

Champions

Men's singles
- (Chinese Taipei) Lu Yen-Hsun

Women's singles
- (China) Zhang Shuai

Men's doubles
- (Japan) Toshihide Matsui / (Thailand) Danai Udomchoke

Women's doubles
- (China) Liu Chang / (China) Zhou Yimiao
← 2012 ·	Beijing International Challenger

The 2013 Beijing International Challenger was a professional tennis tournament played on outdoor hard courts. It was the fourth edition of the tournament which was part of the 2013 ATP Challenger Tour and the 2013 ITF Women's Circuit, both offering a total of $75,000 in prize money. It took place in Beijing, China, on 8–14 July 2013.

== ATP entrants ==
=== Seeds ===
Country	Player	Rank^{1}	Seed
TPE	Lu Yen-Hsun	75	1
JPN	Go Soeda	129	2
CHN	Zhang Ze	166	3
JPN	Tatsuma Ito	181	4
CHN	Wu Di	184	5
JPN	Hiroki Moriya	196	6
THA	Danai Udomchoke	247	7
INA	Christopher Rungkat	301	8

- ^{1} Rankings as of 24 June 2013

=== Other entrants ===
The following players received wildcards into the singles main draw:

- (China) Bai Yan
- (China) Wang Chuhan
- (China) Ning Yuqing
- (China) Ouyang Bowen

The following player received entry using a protected ranking:

- (Australia) Kaden Hensel

The following players received entry from the qualifying draw:

- (Chinese Taipei) Hung Jui-chen
- (South Korea) Na Jung-woong
- (South Korea) Jun Woong-Sun
- (Italy) Erik Crepaldi

== WTA entrants ==
=== Seeds ===
Country	Player	Rank^{1}	Seed
TPE	Hsieh Su-wei	41	1
JPN	Misaki Doi	94	2
CHN	Duan Yingying	111	3
CHN	Zhang Shuai	120	4
CHN	Zhou Yimiao	142	5
RUS	Daria Gavrilova	153	6
CHN	Wang Qiang	161	7
CHN	Zheng Saisai	173	8

- ^{1} Rankings as of 24 June 2013

=== Other entrants ===
The following players received wildcards into the singles main draw:

- (China) Xun Fangying
- (China) Wang Yan
- (China) Ye Qiuyu
- (China) Yang Zhaoxuan

The following players received entry from the qualifying draw:

- (China) Liu Fangzhou
- (South Korea) Jang Su-jeong
- (China) Liu Wanting
- (China) Wen Xin

The following players received entry into the singles main draw as Lucky Losers:

- (China) Tang Haochen
- (China) Zhou Xiao

The following players received entry by a Protected Ranking:

- (Netherlands) Michaëlla Krajicek

== Champions ==
=== Men's singles ===
- (Chinese Taipei) Lu Yen-Hsun def. (Japan) Go Soeda 6–2, 6–4

=== Men's doubles ===
- (Japan) Toshihide Matsui / (Thailand) Danai Udomchoke def. (China) Gong Maoxin / (China) Zhang Ze 4–6, 7–6^{(8–6)}, [10–8]

=== Women's singles ===
- (China) Zhang Shuai def. (China) Zhou Yimiao 6–2, 6–1

=== Women's doubles ===
- (China) Liu Chang / (China) Zhou Yimiao def. (Japan) Misaki Doi / (Japan) Miki Miyamura 7–6^{(7–1)}, 6–4
