= 2012 Beijing International Challenger – Women's singles =

Women's singles
- 2012 Beijing International Challenger

Final
- Champion: (China) Wang Qiang
- Runner-up: (Chinese Taipei) Chan Yung-jan
- Score: 6–2, 6–4

Events
Singles	men	women
Doubles	men	women
← 2011 ·	Beijing International Challenger	· 2013 →

Hsieh Su-wei was the defending champion, but opted to play at the London Summer Olympics instead.

Wang Qiang won the title defeating Chan Yung-jan in the final 6–2, 6–4.

== Seeds ==
1. (France) Stéphanie Foretz Gacon (first round)
2. (Chinese Taipei) Chan Yung-jan (final)
3. (Japan) Kurumi Nara (semifinals)
4. (China) Zhang Shuai (withdrew)
5. (China) Zheng Saisai (first round)
6. (Portugal) Maria João Koehler (first round)
7. (Thailand) Noppawan Lertcheewakarn (first round)
8. (Japan) Yurika Sema (quarterfinals)

== Draw ==
=== Key ===
- Q = Qualifier
- WC = Wild card
- LL = Lucky loser
- Alt = Alternate
- SE = Special exempt
- PR = Protected ranking
- ITF = ITF entry
- JE = Junior exempt
- w/o = Walkover
- r = Retired
- d = Defaulted
- SR = Special ranking

=== Finals ===
Semifinals
(China) Hu Yueyue	3	1
(China) Wang Qiang	6	6
3	(Japan) Kurumi Nara	1	1
2	(Chinese Taipei) Chan Yung-jan	6	6

Final
(China) Wang Qiang	6	6
2	(Chinese Taipei) Chan Yung-jan	2	4

=== Top half ===
First round
1	(France) S Foretz Gacon	3	0
(Thailand) V Wongteanchai	6	6
(China) Y Hu	6	6
(China) Y Zhao	3	0
Q	(China) HC Tang	1	6	0
(Japan) J Namigata	6	1	6
(Turkey) Ç Büyükakçay	7^{7}	6
5	(China) S Zheng	6^{2}	2
LL	(China) C Liang	1	6	6
(China) S Sun	6	3	3
(China) Q Wang	6	6
WC	(China) Y Wang	2	3
(China) X Han	4	6	6
(South Korea) S-h Han	6	2	1
(China) Y Duan	6	6
7	(Thailand) N Lertcheewakarn	4	3

Second round
(Thailand) V Wongteanchai	2	3
(China) Y Hu	6	6
(Japan) J Namigata	6	6
(Turkey) Ç Büyükakçay	4	3
LL	(China) C Liang	6	3	3
(China) Q Wang	2	6	6
(China) X Han	3	6	0
(China) Y Duan	6	3	6

Quarterfinals
(China) Y Hu	7	7^{7}
(Japan) J Namigata	5	6^{4}
(China) Q Wang	6	6
(China) Y Duan	1	4

Semifinals
(China) Y Hu	3	1
(China) Q Wang	6	6

=== Bottom half ===
First round
8	(Japan) Y Sema	6	6
WC	(China) T Li	2	1
Q	(Russia) K Lykina	6	6^{2}	4
(Russia) D Gavrilova	3	7^{7}	6
(Japan) M Eguchi	4	4
Q	(China) Y Zhou	6	6
(Hong Kong) L Zhang	4	6	1
3	(Japan) K Nara	6	4	6
6	(Portugal) MJ Koehler	2	3
Q	(China) X Wen	6	6
(United States) T Luzhanska	2	5
(Chinese Taipei) C-w Chan	6	7
(China) Y Xu	6	7
(Thailand) N Luangnam	3	5
WC	(China) Z Yang	6	6^{3}	2
2	(Chinese Taipei) Y-j Chan	4	7^{7}	6

Second round
8	(Japan) Y Sema	6	6
(Russia) D Gavrilova	4	1
Q	(China) Y Zhou	3	2
3	(Japan) K Nara	6	6
Q	(China) X Wen	2	1
(Chinese Taipei) C-w Chan	6	6
(China) Y Xu	7	2	2
2	(Chinese Taipei) Y-j Chan	5	6	6

Quarterfinals
8	(Japan) Y Sema	4	7	3
3	(Japan) K Nara	6	5	6
(Chinese Taipei) C-w Chan	3	0
2	(Chinese Taipei) Y-j Chan	6	6

Semifinals
3	(Japan) K Nara	1	1
2	(Chinese Taipei) Y-j Chan	6	6
