= 2012 Beijing International Challenger – Women's doubles =

Women's doubles
- 2012 Beijing International Challenger

Final
- Champions: (China) Liu Wanting (China) Sun Shengnan
- Runners-up: (Chinese Taipei) Chan Chin-wei (China) Han Xinyun
- Score: 5–7, 6–0, [10–7]

Events
| Singles | men | women |
| Doubles | men | women |
| ← 2011 · | Beijing International Challenger | · 2013 → |

Chan Hao-ching and Chan Yung-jan were the defending champions, but only Hao-ching chose to participate that year.

Hao-ching played with Makoto Ninomiya, but lost in the semifinals to Chan Chin-wei and Han Xinyun.

Liu Wanting and Sun Shengnan won the title, defeating Chan Chin-wei and Han Xinyun 5–7, 6–0, [10–7] in the final.

== Seeds ==
1. (Chinese Taipei) Chan Chin-wei / (China) Han Xinyun (final)
2. (China) Liu Wanting / (China) Sun Shengnan (champions)
3. (United States) Tetiana Luzhanska / (China) Zheng Saisai (semifinals)
4. (Chinese Taipei) Chan Hao-ching / (Japan) Makoto Ninomiya (semifinals)

== Draw ==
=== Key ===
- Q = Qualifier
- WC = Wild card
- LL = Lucky loser
- Alt = Alternate
- SE = Special exempt
- PR = Protected ranking
- ITF = ITF entry
- JE = Junior exempt
- w/o = Walkover
- r = Retired
- d = Defaulted
- SR = Special ranking

=== Draw ===
First round
1 | (Chinese Taipei) C-w Chan (China) X Han | 7 | 1 | [10]
(China) Y Xu (China) Y Zhou | 5 | 6 | [6]
(Hong Kong) W-y Chan (China) B Wang | 2 | 2
(Australia) A Bai (Japan) K Iijima | 6 | 6
4 | (Chinese Taipei) H-c Chan (Japan) M Ninomiya | 6 | 6
(China) Z Yang (China) Y Zhao | 2 | 2
(China) HC Tang (China) AW Zhu | 5 | 6 | [10]
(South Korea) N-l Han (South Korea) SJ Jang | 7 | 3 | [8]
(Japan) M Eguchi (Japan) J Namigata | 7 | 6
(South Korea) S-r Lee (Thailand) N Wannasuk | 5 | 1
(China) T Li (Thailand) V Wongteanchai | 6 | 1 | [3]
3 | (United States) T Luzhanska (China) S Zheng | 3 | 6 | [10]
(China) Y Wang (China) L Zhu | 6 | 4 | [9]
(China) C Liang (China) R Tian | 3 | 6 | [11]
(Russia) K Lykina (Japan) Y Sema | 7^{8} | 2 | [6]
2 | (China) W Liu (China) S Sun | 6^{6} | 6 | [10]

Quarterfinals
1 | (Chinese Taipei) C-w Chan (China) X Han | 6 | 6
(Australia) A Bai (Japan) K Iijima | 2 | 2
4 | (Chinese Taipei) H-c Chan (Japan) M Ninomiya | 6 | 6
(China) HC Tang (China) AW Zhu | 4 | 0
(Japan) M Eguchi (Japan) J Namigata | 4 | 6 | [10]
3 | (United States) T Luzhanska (China) S Zheng | 6 | 2 | [12]
(China) C Liang (China) R Tian | 4 | 6^{6}
2 | (China) W Liu (China) S Sun | 6 | 7^{8}

Semifinals
1 | (Chinese Taipei) C-w Chan (China) X Han | 6^{4} | 6 | [10]
4 | (Chinese Taipei) H-c Chan (Japan) M Ninomiya | 7^{7} | 4 | [2]
3 | (United States) T Luzhanska (China) S Zheng | 5 | 6 | [10]
2 | (China) W Liu (China) S Sun | 7 | 2 | [12]

Finals
1 | (Chinese Taipei) C-w Chan (China) X Han | 7 | 0 | [7]
2 | (China) W Liu (China) S Sun | 5 | 6 | [10]
