= 2013 Beijing International Challenger – Men's singles =

Men's singles
- 2013 Beijing International Challenger

Final
- Champion: (Chinese Taipei) Lu Yen-Hsun
- Runner-up: (Japan) Go Soeda
- Score: 6–2, 6–4

Events
| Singles | men | women |
| Doubles | men | women |
| ← 2012 · | Beijing International Challenger |

Grega Žemlja was the defending champion, but chose not to compete.
Top seeded Lu Yen-Hsun beat Go Soeda 6–2, 6–4, to claim the title.

== Seeds ==
1. (Chinese Taipei) Lu Yen-Hsun (champion)
2. (Japan) Go Soeda (final)
3. (China) Zhang Ze (semifinals)
4. (Japan) Tatsuma Ito (first round)
5. (China) Wu Di (quarterfinals)
6. (Japan) Hiroki Moriya (quarterfinals)
7. (Thailand) Danai Udomchoke (first round)
8. (Indonesia) Christopher Rungkat (second round)

== Draw ==
=== Key ===
- Q = Qualifier
- WC = Wild card
- LL = Lucky loser
- Alt = Alternate
- SE = Special exempt
- PR = Protected ranking
- ITF = ITF entry
- JE = Junior exempt
- w/o = Walkover
- r = Retired
- d = Defaulted
- SR = Special ranking

=== Finals ===
Semifinals
1 | (Chinese Taipei) Lu Yen-Hsun | 6 | 6
(Japan) Hiroki Kondo | 3 | 0
3 | (China) Ze Zhang | 7^{7} | 4 | 5
2 | (Japan) Go Soeda | 6^{5} | 6 | 7

Final
1 | (Chinese Taipei) Lu Yen-Hsun | 6 | 6
2 | (Japan) Go Soeda | 2 | 4

=== Top half ===
First round
1 | (Chinese Taipei) Y-h Lu | 6 | 6
(China) M Gong | 1 | 4
(Japan) T Matsui | 2 | 6^{3}
WC | (China) Y Bai | 6 | 7^{7}
(New Zealand) A Sitak | 3 | 2
(India) V Vardhan | 6 | 6
(Czech Republic) R Jebavý | 2 | 1
5 | (China) D Wu | 6 | 6
4 | (Japan) T Ito | 4 | 3
(Japan) H Kondo | 6 | 6
(Japan) K Takeuchi | 2 | 6 | 4
PR | (Australia) K Hensel | 6 | 4 | 6
Q | (Chinese Taipei) J-c Hung | 4 | 2
Q | (South Korea) J-w Na | 6 | 6
WC | (China) C Wang | 6^{4} | 6 | 3
8 | (Indonesia) C Rungkat | 7^{7} | 0 | 6

Second round
1 | (Chinese Taipei) Y-h Lu | 6 | 3
WC | (China) Y Bai | 0 | 0^{r}
(India) V Vardhan | 3 | 2
5 | (China) D Wu | 6 | 6
(Japan) H Kondo | 6 | 0
PR | (Australia) K Hensel | 4 | 1^{r}
Q | (South Korea) J-w Na | 6 | 6
8 | (Indonesia) C Rungkat | 1 | 1

Quarterfinals
1 | (Chinese Taipei) Y-h Lu | 4 | 7 | 6
5 | (China) D Wu | 6 | 5 | 0
(Japan) H Kondo | 7^{7} | 6
Q | (South Korea) J-w Na | 6^{3} | 4

Semifinals
1 | (Chinese Taipei) Y-h Lu | 6 | 6
(Japan) H Kondo | 3 | 0

=== Bottom half ===
First round
7 | (Thailand) D Udomchoke | 4 | 6 | 6^{2}
(New Zealand) J Statham | 6 | 3 | 7^{7}
(Australia) L Saville | 6 | 5 | 4
(Japan) Yuichi Ito | 3 | 7 | 6
WC | (China) Ning Yuqing | 6 | 3 | 1
(Spain) R Ortega Olmedo | 2 | 6 | 6
Q | (South Korea) W-s Jun | 3 | 1
3 | (China) Z Zhang | 6 | 6
6 | (Japan) H Moriya | 6 | 6
(Serbia) N Ćirić | 4 | 2
(Japan) Shuichi Sekiguchi | 4 | 6 | 6
WC | (China) B Ouyang | 6 | 3 | 4
(China) L Zhe | 6 | 6
Q | (Italy) Erik Crepaldi | 3 | 4
(China) Chang Yu | 4 | 2
2 | (Japan) G Soeda | 6 | 6

Second round
(New Zealand) J Statham | 6 | 6
(Japan) Yuichi Ito | 3 | 3
(Spain) R Ortega Olmedo | 5 | 2
3 | (China) Z Zhang | 7 | 6
6 | (Japan) H Moriya | 6 | 6^{3} | 6
(Japan) S Sekiguchi | 4 | 7^{7} | 3
(China) L Zhe | 1 | 3
2 | (Japan) G Soeda | 6 | 6

Quarterfinals
(New Zealand) J Statham | 1 | 5
3 | (China) Z Zhang | 6 | 7
6 | (Japan) H Moriya | 6 | 4 | 1
2 | (Japan) G Soeda | 3 | 6 | 6

Semifinals
3 | (China) Z Zhang | 7^{7} | 4 | 5
2 | (Japan) G Soeda | 6^{5} | 6 | 7
