= 2013 ITF Men's Circuit =

2013 men's professional tennis circuit

Details
- Duration: 7 January – 29 December 2013
- Edition: 16th
- Tournaments: 638
- Categories: $15,000 tournaments (170) $10,000 tournaments (468)

Achievements (singles)
- Most titles: (Egypt) Mohamed Safwat (9)

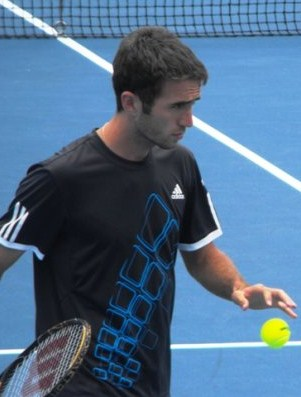
Marsel İlhan won six titles on the ITF Men's Circuit in 2013.

The 2013 ITF Men's Circuit is the 2013 edition of the entry level tour for men's professional tennis, and is the third tier tennis tour below the Association of Tennis Professionals, World Tour and Challenger Tour. It is organised by the International Tennis Federation (ITF) who additionally organizes the ITF Women's Circuit which is an entry-level tour for women's professional tennis. Future tournaments are organized to offer either $10,000 or $15,000 in prize money and tournaments which offering hospitality to players competing in the main draw give additional ranking points which are valid under the ATP ranking system, and are to be organized by a national association or approved by the ITF Men's Circuit Committee.

The tournaments are played on a rectangular flat surface, commonly referred to as a tennis court. The dimensions of a tennis court are defined and regulated by the ITF and the court is 23.78 meters (78.0 feet) long, 10.97 meters (36.0 feet) wide. Its width is 8.23 meters (27.0 feet) for singles matches and 10.97 meters (36.0 feet) for doubles matches. Tennis is played on a variety of surfaces and each surface has its own characteristics which affect the playing style of the game. There are four main types of courts depending on the materials used for the court surface, clay, hard, grass and carpet courts with the ITF classifying five different pace settings ranging from slow to fast.

== Participating host nations ==
- Argentina (ARG)
- Armenia (ARM)
- Australia (AUS)
- Austria (AUT)
- Bahrain (BHR)
- Belarus (BLR)
- Belgium (BEL)
- Bolivia (BOL)
- Bosnia and Herzegovina (BIH)
- Brazil (BRA)
- Bulgaria (BUL)
- Burundi (BDI)
- Cambodia (CAM)
- Canada (CAN)
- Chile (CHI)
- China (CHN)
- Chinese Taipei (TPE)
- Colombia (COL)
- Croatia (CRO)
- Cyprus (CYP)
- Czech Republic (CZE)
- Denmark (DEN)
- Ecuador (ECU)
- Egypt (EGY)
- El Salvador (ESA)
- Estonia (EST)
- Finland (FIN)
- France (FRA)
- Gabon (GAB)
- Georgia (GEO)
- Germany (GER)
- Great Britain (GBR)
- Greece (GRE)
- Guam (GUM)
- Guatemala (GUA)
- Hungary (HUN)
- India (IND)
- Israel (ISR)
- Italy (ITA)
- Japan (JPN)
- Kazakhstan (KAZ)
- Kuwait (KUW)
- Latvia (LAT)
- Liechtenstein (LIE) (Note: The second Switzerland tournament was held in Vaduz, Liechtenstein.)
- Lithuania (LTU)
- Mexico (MEX)
- Morocco (MAR)
- Netherlands (NED)
- Nigeria (NGR)
- Peru (PER)
- Poland (POL)
- Portugal (POR)
- Qatar (QAT)
- Ireland (IRL)
- Romania (ROU)
- Russia (RUS)
- Rwanda (RWA)
- Senegal (SEN)
- Serbia (SRB)
- Slovakia (SVK)
- Slovenia (SLO)
- South Korea (KOR)
- Spain (ESP)
- Sweden (SWE)
- Switzerland (SUI)
- Thailand (THA)
- Turkey (TUR)
- Ukraine (UKR)
- United States (USA)
- Uzbekistan (UZB)
- Venezuela (VEN)
- Vietnam (VIE)

Countries that are hosting a tournament in 2013, but did not in 2012.

- Belarus (BLR)
- Cyprus (CYP)
- Denmark (DEN)
- El Salvador (ESA)
- Gabon (GAB)
- Guam (GUM)
- Hungary (HUN)
- Senegal (SEN)

== Schedule ==
=== Key ===
$15,000 tournaments
$10,000 tournaments

=== January–March ===
No.	January				February				March			
No.	7	14	21	28	4	11	18	25	4	11	18	25
1	GER F1	FRA F1	FRA F2	FRA F3	GBR F4	AUS F1	AUS F2	COL F1	CAN F1	CAN F2	AUS F4	AUS F5
2	TUR F1	GER F2	GER F3	GER F4	MEX F3	CRO F1	CRO F2	GBR F5	COL F2	CRO F4	CRO F5	BHR F1
3	USA F1	GBR F1	GBR F2	GBR F3	ESP F1	MEX F4	KAZ F1	IND F1	CRO F3	FRA F5	FRA F6	CRO F6
4		ISR F1	ISR F2	ISR F3	TUR F5	ESP F2	POR F1	ISR F4	FRA F4	GBR F7	GBR F8	ITA F1
5		TUR F2	MEX F1	MEX F2		TUR F6	RUS F1	KAZ F2	GBR F6	IND F3	JPN F2	JPN F3
6		USA F2	TUR F3	TUR F4			ESP F1	POR F2	IND F2	ISR F6	RUS F3	RUS F4
7			USA F3	USA F4			TUR F7	RUS F2	ISR F5	JPN F1	ESP F7	ESP F8
8							UKR F1	ESP F4	POR F3	POR F4	SUI F3	TUR F12
9							USA F5	TUR F8	ESP F5	ESP F6	TUR F11	VIE F1
10								UKR F8	SUI F1	SUI F2	USA F8	
11								USA F6	TUR F9	TUR F10		
12									UKR F3	USA F7		

=== April–June ===
No.	April					May				June			
No.	1	8	15	22	29	6	13	20	27	3	10	17	24
1	EGY F1	CHN F1	CHI F1	ARG F1	ARG F9	ARG F5	ARG F6	ARG F7	ARG F8	ARG F9	BIH F3	BEL F1	AUT F1
2	GRE F1	EGY F2	CHN F2	CHI F2	CHI F3	EGY F6	BUL F1	BUL F2	BIH F1	BIH F2	EGY F11	BIH F4	BEL F2
3	ITA F2	FRA F7	EGY F3	CHN F3	EGY F5	GBR F11	CHN F4	CHN F5	BUL F3	EGY F10	GER F5	BUL F4	BUL F5
4	JPN F1	GRE F2	FRA F8	EGY F4	GBR F10	GRE F6	CZE F1	CZE F2	CZE F3	GUM F1	IND F8	EGY F12	EGY F13
5	QAT F1	ITA F3	GRE F3	FRA F9	GRE F5	GUA F1	EGY F7	EGY F8	EGY F9	IND F7	ISR F11	GER F6	FRA F10
6	ESP F9	QAT F2	ITA F4	GBR F9	IND F4	IND F5	ESA F1	GRE F8	GRE F9	ISR F10	ITA F12	ISR F12	GER F7
7	TUR F13	TUR F14	TUR F15	GRE F4	ISR F8	ISR F9	GRE F7	ITA F9	IND F6	ITA F11	JPN F5	ITA F14	ITA F13
8	VIE F2	USA F9	USA F10	ISR F7	ITA F6	ITA F7	ITA F8	KOR F3	IND F6	KOR F5	KOR F6	JPN F6	JPN F7
9		UZB F1	UZB F1	ITA F5	KAZ F3	KAZ F4	KAZ F5	MEX F9	ITA F10	MEX F11	MEX F12	KOR F7	KOR F8
10				MEX F5	KOR F1	KOR F2	MEX F8	POR F7	KOR F4	MAR F2	MAR F3	NED F2	NED F3
11				ESP F10	MEX F6	MEX F7	POR F6	ROU F2	MEX F10	SLO F2	NED F1	ROU F4	ROU F5
12				TUR F16	ESP F12	POR F5	ROU F1	RUS F7	MAR F1	ESP F16	SRB F1	SRB F2	SRB F3
13				UZB F2	SWE F1	RUS F5	RUS F6	ESP F11	POR F8	THA F3	SLO F3	ESP F18	ESP F19
14					TUR F17	ESP F13	ESP F14	THA F1	ROU F3	TUR F22	ESP F17	TUR F24	TUR F25
15					USA F11	SWE F2	SWE F2	TUR F20	RUS F8	USA F14	TUR F23	USA F16	USA F17
16						TUR F18	TUR F19		SLO F1		USA F15		
17						USA F12	USA F13		ESP F15				
18						VEN F1	VEN F2		THA F2				
19									TUR F21				

=== July–September ===
No.	July					August				September				
No.	1	8	15	22	29	5	12	19	26	2	9	16	23	30
1	AUT F2	ARG F11	ARG F12	ARG F13	BEL F7	AUT F6	ARG F14	ARG F15	ARG F16	CAN F7	AUS F6	AUS F7	AUS F8	ARM F1
2	BEL F3	AUT F3	AUT F4	AUT F5	BRA F3	BEL F8	AUT F7	AUT F8	AUT F9	FRA F14	CAN F8	BRA F8	BRA F9	BRA F10
3	BUL F6	BEL F4	BEL F5	BEL F6	DEN F3	BRA F4	BLR F1	BLR F2	BEL F11	GEO F1	FRA F15	CAN F9	BDI F1	FRA F18
4	CAN F3	BUL F7	DEN F1	BRA F1	EGY F18	CHN F6	BEL F9	BEL F10	TPE F2	RUS F13	GEO F2	FRA F16	MAR F4	HUN F1
5	EGY F14	CAN F4	EGY F16	DEN F2	GER F12	COL F3	BRA F5	BRA F6	CRO F9	ESP F29	ARG F18	ARG F19	ESP F32	MAR F5
6	FRA F11	CZE F4	EST F1	EGY F17	GBR F15	EGY F19	CAN F5	CAN F6	ECU F3	ARG F17	EGY F24	EGY F25	ARG F20	RWA F1
7	GER F8	EGY F15	FRA F13	EST F2	ITA F19	FIN F1	CHN F7	TPE F1	EGY F22	AUT F10	GBR F19	GRE F11	BOL F3	BOL F4
8	GBR F12	FRA F12	GER F10	GER F11	LTU F1	GER F13	COL F4	COL F5	GAB F2	EGY F23	GRE F10	ITA F26	CHI F4	CHI F5
9	ITA F15	GER F9	GBR F14	IRL F1	POL F1	GBR F16	CRO F7	CRO F8	GER F16	GBR F18	ITA F25	KUW F1	EGY F26	EGY F27
10	JPN F8	GBR F13	ITA F17	ITA F18	RUS F9	ITA F20	ECU F1	ECU F2	GBR F17	ITA F24	SRB F12	SRB F13	FRA F17	GER F17
11	NED F4	ITA F16	SRB F5	SRB F6	SRB F7	LAT F1	EGY F20	EGY F21	ITA F23	TUR F35	ESP F30	ESP F31	GRE F12	GRE F13
12	ROU F6	ROU F7	SVK F1	SVK F2	SVK F3	POL F2	FIN F2	FIN F3	NED F6		SWE F4	SWE F5	ITA F27	ITA F28
13	ESP F20	SRB F4	ESP F22	ESP F23	ESP F24	RUS F10	GER F14	GAB F1	POL F5		TUR F36	TUR F37	KUW F2	KUW F3
14	TUR F26	ESP F21	TUR F28	TUR F29	TUR F30	SRB F8	ITA F21	GER F15	ROU F10		USA F23	USA F24	SRB F14	MEX F13
15	USA F18	TUR F27	USA F19	USA F20	USA F21	SVK F4	POL F3	ITA F22	RUS F12				SWE F6	ESP F33
16						ESP F25	ROU F8	NED F5	SRB F11				TUR F38	SWE F7
17						TUR F31	SRB F9	POL F4	ESP F28				USA F25	TUR F39
18						USA F22	ESP F26	ROU F9	SUI F6					
19						VEN F3	SUI F4	RUS F11	TUR F34					
20							TUR F32	SRB F10						
21							VEN F4	ESP F27						
22								SUI F5						
23								TUR F33						
24								VEN F5						

=== October–December ===
No.	October				November				December			
No.	7	14	21	28	4	11	18	25	2	9	16	23
1	ARM F2	AUS F10	BRA F13	BRA F14	BRA F16	COL F6	COL F7	CZE F7	SEN F2	BRA F20	BRA F21	TUR F51
2	AUS F9	CRO F11	CRO F12	CRO F13	CRO F14	CHI F7	CZE F6	SEN F1	THA F5	CAM F3	CHI F12	
3	FRA F19	NGR F1	FRA F21	EGY F31	EGY F32	CRO F15	IND F10	THA F5	VEN F9	CHI F11	QAT F5	
4	HUN F2	USA F27	NGR F2	GBR F23	GRE F18	CYP F1	CHI F8	VEN F8	BRA F19	EGY F36	TUR F50	
5	USA F26	BRA F12	EGY F30	GRE F17	MEX F18	EGY F33	CRO F16	BRA F18	CAM F2	QAT F4		
6	BOL F5	EGY F29	GER F20	MEX F17	ESP F38	GRE F19	CYP F2	CAM F1	CHI F10	TUR F49		
7	BRA F11	FRA F20	GBR F22	ESP F37	TUR F44	IND F9	GRE F20	CHI F9	EGY F35			
8	CHI F6	GER F19	GRE F16	TUR F43	USA F30	MEX F19	MEX F20	CRO F17	QAT F3			
9	CRO F10	GBR F21	ISR F15	USA F29		ESP F39	ESP F40	CYP F3	ESP F42			
10	EGY F28	GRE F15	KAZ F8			TUR F45	TUR F46	EGY F34	TUR F48			
11	GER F18	ISR F14	MEX F16			USA F31		IND F11				
12	GBR F20	ITA F30	PER F3					ESP F41				
13	GRE F14	KAZ F7	POR F11					TUR F47				
14	ISR F14	MEX F15	ESP F36									
15	ITA F29	PER F2	TUR F42									
16	KAZ F6	POR F10	USA F28									
17	MEX F14	ESP F35										
18	PER F1	TUR F41										
19	POR F9											
20	ESP F34											
21	TUR F40											

== Point distribution ==
Tournament Category	W	F	SF	QF	R16	R32
Futures 15,000+H	35	20	10	4	1	0
Futures 15,000	27	15	8	3	1	0
Futures 10,000+H	27	15	8	3	1	0
Futures 10,000	18	10	6	2	1	0
