= Zhou Xiao =

Chinese footballer

Zhou Xiao 周潇
Personal information
- Date of birth: 17 May 1999 (age 27)
- Place of birth: Nanchong, Sichuan, China
- Height: 1.82 m (5 ft 11 1/2 in)
- Position: Defender

Youth career
- Rayo Majadahonda
- Atlético Madrid youth

Senior career*
Years	Team	Apps	(Gls)
2018–2019	Atlético Astorga	7	(0)
2019–2021	Dalian Professional	2	(1)

International career
2018–	China U-20		
- * Club domestic league appearances and goals as of 31 December 2022

Zhou Xiao (Chinese: 周潇; pinyin: Zhou Xiao; born 17 May 1999) is a Chinese footballer who plays as a defender.

== Club career ==
Zhou Xiao was selected to train with Villarreal youth training camp by the Wanda Football Star project in 2012. He moved to Atlético Madrid youth and Rayo Majadahonda División de Honor, before joining Atlético Astorga in 2018. With Atlético Astorga he would be promoted to their senior team and make his debut in a league game on 25 August 2018 against SD Almazán that ended in a 6-1 victory.

On 29 July 2019, Zhou Xiao would return to China to sign for Chinese Super League club Dalian Professional. He made his debut in a league game on 28 November 2019 against Tianjin Tianhai F.C. where he scored his debut goal in a 5-1 defeat. Despite his goal, Zhou would struggle to gain much more playing time and would be released once his contract expired.

== Career statistics ==
As of 31 December 2022.

Appearances and goals by club, season and competition
Club	Season	League			National Cup		Continental		Other		Total	
Club	Season	Division	Apps	Goals	Apps	Goals	Apps	Goals	Apps	Goals	Apps	Goals
Atlético Astorga FC	2018–19	Tercera División	7	0	-		-		-		7	0
Dalian Professional	2019	Chinese Super League	2	1	0	0	-		-		2	1
Dalian Professional	2020	Chinese Super League	0	0	1	0	-		-		1	0
Dalian Professional	2021	Chinese Super League	0	0	0	0	-		0 (Note: Appearance(s) in Promotion/Relegation Play-offs)	0	0	0
Dalian Professional	Total		2	1	1	0	0	0	0	0	3	1
Career total			9	1	1	0	0	0	0	0	10	1
