= Chang Yu (tennis) =

Chinese tennis player

- Country (sports): China
- Residence: Tianjin, China
- Born: 14 August 1988 (age 36); Tianjin, China
- Height: 1.85 m (6 ft 1 in)
- Plays: Left-handed (two-handed backhand)
- Prize money: $ 59,321

Singles
- Career record: 0–0
- Career titles: 0
- Highest ranking: No. 335 (8 April 2013)

Doubles
- Career record: 0–2
- Career titles: 0
- Highest ranking: No. 369 (4 March 2013)
- Last updated on: 21 June 2018.

Chang Yu (born August 14, 1988) is a Chinese former tennis player. On 8 April 2013, he reached his highest ATP singles ranking of world No. 335. His highest doubles ranking of No. 369 was achieved on 4 March 2013.

== Career ==
He competed in two ATP World Tour events in 2012 in the doubles competition partnering Li Zhe.

== ATP Challengers and ITF Futures titles ==
=== Singles: 2 ===
ATP Challengers (0)
ITF Futures (2)

No.	Date	Tournament	Surface	Opponent	Score
1.	25 March 2012	Nishitōkyō, Japan	Hard	(Japan) Takuto Niki	6–2, 6–3
2.	30 March 2013	Kofu, Japan	Hard	(South Korea) Nam Hyun-woo	6–2, 6–1

=== Doubles: 5 ===
ATP Challengers (0)
ITF Futures (5)
