= 2011 Morocco Tennis Tour – Rabat – Singles =

Rabat – Singles
- 2011 Morocco Tennis Tour – Rabat

Final
- Champion: (Czech Republic) Ivo Minář
- Runner-up: (Australia) Peter Luczak
- Score: 7–5, 6–3

Events
Singles	Doubles
- Morocco Tennis Tour – Rabat

Rubén Ramírez Hidalgo decided not to defend his last year's title.
Ivo Minář won in the final against Peter Luczak 7–5, 6–3.

== Seeds ==
1. (Portugal) Rui Machado (first round)
2. (Czech Republic) Jan Hájek (second round)
3. (Spain) Albert Ramos (second round)
4. (Czech Republic) Jaroslav Pospíšil (first round)
5. (Netherlands) Jesse Huta Galung (first round)
6. (France) Benoît Paire (first round)
7. (Germany) Simon Greul (first round)
8. (Kazakhstan) Yuri Schukin (second round)

== Draw ==
Key

- Q = Qualifier
- WC = Wild card
- LL = Lucky loser
- Alt = Alternate
- ITF = ITF entry
- PR = Protected ranking
- SR = Special ranking
- SE = Special exempt
- JE = Junior exempt
- JR = Junior Accelerator Programme entrant
- CO = College Accelerator Programme entrant
- NG = Next Gen Accelerator Program entrant
- w/o = Walkover
- r = Retired
- d = Defaulted

=== Finals ===
Semifinals
(Australia) Peter Luczak	6	6
WC	(Tunisia) Malek Jaziri	4	1
(Czech Republic) Ivo Minář	6	6
(Slovakia) Martin Kližan	4	3

Final
(Australia) Peter Luczak	5	3
(Czech Republic) Ivo Minář	7	6

=== Top half ===
First round
1	(Portugal) R Machado	6	3	3
Q	(France) J Dasnières de Veigy	4	6	6
(France) A Gensse	4	5
(Australia) P Luczak	6	7
(Czech Republic) D Lojda	6	6
LL	(Italy) A Brizzi	1	4
Q	(Sweden) C Lindell	7	6
6	(France) B Paire	5	4
4	(Czech Republic) J Pospíšil	6^{5}	2
WC	(Tunisia) M Jaziri	7	6
(Slovakia) M Semjan	5	2
WC	(Morocco) Y Idmbarek	7	6
Q	(Spain) P Carreño-Busta	7	6
(Italy) A di Mauro	5	1
(Kazakhstan) E Korolev	6	6
5	(Netherlands) J Huta Galung	4	1

Second round
Q	(France) J Dasnières de Veigy	2	3
(Australia) P Luczak	6	6
(Czech Republic) D Lojda	6	7
Q	(Sweden) C Lindell	4	6^{5}
WC	(Tunisia) M Jaziri	6	6
WC	(Morocco) Y Idmbarek	4	4
Q	(Spain) P Carreño-Busta	6	7
(Kazakhstan) E Korolev	4	5

Quarterfinals
(Australia) P Luczak	6	6
(Czech Republic) D Lojda	1	2
WC	(Tunisia) M Jaziri	6	6
Q	(Spain) P Carreño-Busta	3	4

Semifinals
(Australia) P Luczak	6	6
WC	(Tunisia) M Jaziri	4	1

=== Bottom half ===
First round
7	(Germany) S Greul	6	4	3
(Slovakia) I Klec	3	6	6
WC	(Morocco) H Khaddari	4	4
(Argentina) F del Bonis	6	6
(Italy) S Vagnozzi	5	0
(Czech Republic) I Minář	7	6
(Romania) V Crivoi	2	3
3	(Spain) A Ramos	6	6
8	(Kazakhstan) Y Schukin	6	6
WC	(Morocco) Younes Rachidi	1	1
(Spain) G Alcaide	6	6
(Germany) B Knittel	4	4
Q	(France) M Teixeira	4	2
(Slovakia) M Kližan	6	6
(Morocco) R El Amrani	0^{r}
2	(Czech Republic) J Hájek	3

Second round
(Slovakia) I Klec	5	6^{2}
(Argentina) F del Bonis	7	7
(Czech Republic) I Minář	6	3	6
3	(Spain) A Ramos	4	6	0
8	(Kazakhstan) Y Schukin	2	6	3
(Spain) G Alcaide	6	0	6
(Slovakia) M Kližan	6	1
2	(Czech Republic) J Hájek	2	0^{r}

Quarterfinals
(Argentina) F del Bonis	6	3	2
(Czech Republic) I Minář	4	6	6
(Spain) G Alcaide	6^{7}	3
(Slovakia) M Kližan	7	6

Semifinals
(Czech Republic) I Minář	6	6
(Slovakia) M Kližan	4	3
