= 2009 Flea Market Cup – Singles =

Singles
- 2009 Flea Market Cup

Final
- Champion: (Chinese Taipei) Lu Yen-hsun
- Runner-up: (Netherlands) Igor Sijsling
- Score: 6–2, 6–3

Events
Singles	Doubles
← 2008 ·	Flea Market Cup	· 2010 →

Ivo Minář chose to not defend his 2008 title.
Lu Yen-hsun defeated Igor Sijsling 6–2, 6–3 in the final match.

== Seeds ==
1. (Netherlands) Thiemo de Bakker (first round)
2. (Chinese Taipei) Lu Yen-hsun (champion)
3. (Slovakia) Lukáš Lacko (second round)
4. (Israel) Harel Levy (semifinals)
5. (South Korea) Im Kyu-tae (first round)
6. (Australia) Marinko Matosevic (second round)
7. (United States) Alex Kuznetsov (quarterfinals)
8. (South Korea) ~~Lee Hyung-taik~~ (withdrew)

== Draw ==
=== Key ===
- Q = Qualifier
- WC = Wild card
- LL = Lucky loser
- Alt = Alternate
- SE = Special exempt
- PR = Protected ranking
- ITF = ITF entry
- JE = Junior exempt
- w/o = Walkover
- r = Retired
- d = Defaulted
- SR = Special ranking

=== Finals ===
Semifinals
(Denmark) Frederik Nielsen	3	2
(Netherlands) Igor Sijsling	6	6
4	(Israel) Harel Levy	4	4
2	(Chinese Taipei) Lu Yen-hsun	6	6

Final
(Netherlands) Igor Sijsling	2	3
2	(Chinese Taipei) Lu Yen-hsun	6	6

=== Top half ===
First round
1	(Netherlands) T de Bakker	6^{3}	6	6^{3}
Q	(South Korea) W-s Jun	7	2	7
(Denmark) F Nielsen	7	6
Q	(South Korea) D Yoo	6^{3}	0
(Czech Republic) D Lojda	4	6	7
WC	(South Korea) Y-k Lim	6	3	6^{5}
(Japan) Y Sugita	4	2
7	(United States) A Kuznetsov	6	6
3	(Slovakia) L Lacko	6	6
(Slovakia) M Kližan	2	1
(Netherlands) I Sijsling	6	6
(Czech Republic) P Šnobel	3	4
WC	(South Korea) S-w Noh	2	3
(Latvia) A Juška	6	6
(India) P Amritraj	7	6
5	(South Korea) K-t Im	6^{2}	2

Second round
Q	(South Korea) W-s Jun	2	2
(Denmark) F Nielsen	6	6
(Czech Republic) D Lojda	3	2
7	(United States) A Kuznetsov	6	6
3	(Slovakia) L Lacko	4	6	4
(Netherlands) I Sijsling	6	2	6
(Latvia) A Juška	1	6	6^{4}
(India) P Amritraj	6	2	7

Quarterfinals
(Denmark) F Nielsen	6	7
7	(United States) A Kuznetsov	4	5
(Netherlands) I Sijsling	7	6
(India) P Amritraj	6^{5}	4

Semifinals
(Denmark) F Nielsen	3	2
(Netherlands) I Sijsling	6	6

=== Bottom half ===
First round
LL	(Japan) H Moriya	4	6	3
Q	(South Korea) Y-j Lim	6	4	6
(Slovakia) K Čapkovič	1	1
(Germany) T Kamke	6	6
(Slovakia) P Červenák	6	6
WC	(South Korea) S-y Kim Jr.	1	2
(Australia) G Jones	5	6	3
4	(Israel) H Levy	7	3	6
6	(Australia) M Matosevic	6	4	6
(Germany) M Bachinger	4	6	3
(Japan) T Ito	6	6
WC	(South Korea) S-j Cho	2	2
(United States) T Widom	5	0
(South Africa) R de Voest	7	6
Q	(Australia) S Kadir	3	0
2	(Chinese Taipei) Y-h Lu	6	6

Second round
Q	(South Korea) Y-j Lim	1	7	0
(Germany) T Kamke	6	6^{9}	6
(Slovakia) P Červenák	4	2
4	(Israel) H Levy	6	6
6	(Australia) M Matosevic	5	4
(Japan) T Ito	7	6
(South Africa) R de Voest	4	3
2	(Chinese Taipei) Y-h Lu	6	6

Quarterfinals
(Germany) T Kamke	7	4	1
4	(Israel) H Levy	5	6	6
(Japan) T Ito	4	3
2	(Chinese Taipei) Y-h Lu	6	6

Semifinals
4	(Israel) H Levy	4	4
2	(Chinese Taipei) Y-h Lu	6	6
