= 2010 Morocco Tennis Tour – Rabat – Doubles =

Rabat – Doubles
- 2010 Morocco Tennis Tour – Rabat

Final
- Champions: (Serbia) Ilija Bozoljac; (Italy) Daniele Bracciali
- Runners-up: (Ukraine) Oleksandr Dolgopolov Jr.; (Russia) Dmitri Sitak
- Score: 6–4, 6–4

Events
Singles	Doubles
- Morocco Tennis Tour – Rabat

Rubén Ramírez Hidalgo and Santiago Ventura were the defending champions; however, they lost to Pablo Andújar and Iván Navarro in the first round.
Ilija Bozoljac and Daniele Bracciali won in the final 6–4, 6–4, against Oleksandr Dolgopolov Jr. and Dmitri Sitak.

== Seeds ==
1. (Spain) Rubén Ramírez Hidalgo / (Spain) Santiago Ventura (first round)
2. (Poland) Tomasz Bednarek / (Italy) Alessandro Motti (first round)
3. (United States) James Cerretani / (Canada) Adil Shamasdin (semifinals)
4. (Philippines) Treat Conrad Huey / (India) Harsh Mankad (first round)

== Draw ==
Key

- Q = Qualifier
- WC = Wild card
- LL = Lucky loser
- Alt = Alternate
- ITF = ITF entry
- PR = Protected ranking
- SR = Special ranking
- SE = Special exempt
- JE = Junior exempt
- JR = Junior Accelerator Programme entrant
- CO = College Accelerator Programme entrant
- NG = Next Gen Accelerator Program entrant
- w/o = Walkover
- r = Retired
- d = Defaulted

=== Draw ===
First round

Quarterfinals

Semifinals

Finals

1
- (Spain) R Ramírez Hidalgo
- (Spain) S Ventura
5
7
[6]

- (Spain) P Andújar
- (Spain) I Navarro
7
5
[10]

- (Spain) P Andújar
- (Spain) I Navarro
6
6

WC
- (Morocco) A Fattar
- (Morocco) Y Idmbarek
3
6
[10]

WC
- (Morocco) A Fattar
- (Morocco) Y Idmbarek
1
1

- (Russia) T Gabashvili
- (France) A Sidorenko
6
2
[6]

- (Spain) P Andújar
- (Spain) I Navarro
4
1

4
- (Philippines) TC Huey
- (India) H Mankad
3
6
[4]

- (Ukraine) O Dolgopolov Jr.
- (Russia) D Sitak
6
6

- (Slovenia) B Kavčič
- (Germany) D Meffert
6
4
[10]

- (Slovenia) B Kavčič
- (Germany) D Meffert
6
3
[6]

- (Ukraine) O Dolgopolov Jr.
- (Russia) D Sitak
6
6

- (Ukraine) O Dolgopolov Jr.
- (Russia) D Sitak
2
6
[10]

- (Romania) V Crivoi
- (Romania) A Ungur
3
4

- (Ukraine) O Dolgopolov Jr.
- (Russia) D Sitak
4
4

WC
- (Morocco) R Chaki
- (Morocco) R El Amrani
2
6
[10]

- (Serbia) I Bozoljac
- (Italy) D Bracciali
6
6

WC
- (Morocco) M Saber
- (Morocco) M Ziadi
6
3
[5]

WC
- (Morocco) R Chaki
- (Morocco) R El Amrani
4
2

- (France) T Ascione
- (France) L Recouderc
4
5

3
- (United States) J Cerretani
- (Canada) A Shamasdin
6
6

3
- (United States) J Cerretani
- (Canada) A Shamasdin
6
7

3
- (United States) J Cerretani
- (Canada) A Shamasdin
5
6
[10]

- (Spain) D Marrero
7
6

- (Serbia) I Bozoljac
- (Italy) D Bracciali
7
4
[12]

- (Algeria) L Ouahab
- (Spain) A Ramos Viñolas
6^{4}
2

- (Spain) D Marrero
3
6^{3}

- (Serbia) I Bozoljac
- (Italy) D Bracciali
6
6

- (Serbia) I Bozoljac
- (Italy) D Bracciali
6
7

2
- (Poland) T Bednarek
- (Italy) A Motti
4
4
