= 2009 Zagorka Cup – Singles =

Singles
- 2009 Zagorka Cup

Final
- Champion: (Czech Republic) Ivo Minář
- Runner-up: (Germany) Florian Mayer
- Score: 6–4, 6–3

Events
Singles	Doubles
← 2008 ·	Zagorka Cup	· 2010 →

Top seeded Ivo Minář won in the final 6–4, 6–3, against Florian Mayer.

== Seeds ==
1. (Czech Republic) Ivo Minář (champion)
2. (Belgium) Steve Darcis (semifinals)
3. (Croatia) Roko Karanušić (quarterfinals)
4. (Belgium) Olivier Rochus (quarterfinals)
5. (Portugal) Rui Machado (first round)
6. (France) Mathieu Montcourt (second round)
7. (Czech Republic) Lukáš Rosol (quarterfinals)
8. (Germany) Daniel Brands (first round)

== Draw ==
Key

- Q = Qualifier
- WC = Wild card
- LL = Lucky loser
- Alt = Alternate
- ITF = ITF entry
- PR = Protected ranking
- SR = Special ranking
- SE = Special exempt
- JE = Junior exempt
- JR = Junior Accelerator Programme entrant
- CO = College Accelerator Programme entrant
- NG = Next Gen Accelerator Program entrant
- w/o = Walkover
- r = Retired
- d = Defaulted

=== Final four ===
Semifinals
1/WC	(Czech Republic) Ivo Minář	6	3	6
(France) Alexandre Sidorenko	4	6	3
PR	(Germany) Florian Mayer	6	4	6
2	(Belgium) Steve Darcis	3	6	2

Final
1/WC	(Czech Republic) Ivo Minář	6	6
PR	(Germany) Florian Mayer	4	3

=== Top half ===
First round
1WC	(Czech Republic) I Minář	6	6
Q	(Netherlands) M Middelkoop	4	4
WC	(Bulgaria) T Grozdanov	7	6^{2}	4
(Germany) A Flock	6^{3}	7	6
WC	(Austria) A Haider-Maurer	7	2	6
(Argentina) S Decoud	6^{5}	6	3
(Netherlands) T de Bakker	6	6
5	(Portugal) R Machado	2	4
3	(Croatia) R Karanušić	6	6
(Slovenia) L Gregorc	3	3
Q	(Italy) E Burzi	4	6	6
(Romania) A Ungur	6	1	4
Q	(Greece) K Economidis	3	7	0
(Slovakia) D Hrbatý	6	6^{6}	6
(France) A Sidorenko	7	6
8	(Germany) D Brands	5	2

Second round
1WC	(Czech Republic) I Minář	6	6
(Germany) A Flock	4	2
WC	(Austria) A Haider-Maurer	4	6	7
(Netherlands) T de Bakker	6	3	5
3	(Croatia) R Karanušić	6	6
Q	(Italy) E Burzi	4	1
(Slovakia) D Hrbatý	3	1
(France) A Sidorenko	6	6

Quarterfinals
1WC	(Czech Republic) I Minář	7	6
WC	(Austria) A Haider-Maurer	6^{5}	1
(Croatia) R Karanušić	6	6^{3}	0
(France) A Sidorenko	4	7	6

Semifinals
1WC	(Czech Republic) I Minář	6	3	6
(France) A Sidorenko	4	6	3

=== Bottom half ===
First round
6	(France) M Montcourt	4	6	6
(Italy) S Galvani	6	0	3
(Brazil) R Hocevar	2	3
PR	(Germany) F Mayer	6	6
(Germany) M Bachinger	6	6
Q	(Australia) R Junaid	2	2
(Germany) T Kamke	4	3
4	(Belgium) O Rochus	6	6
7	(Czech Republic) L Rosol	6	4
(Belgium) N Desein	4	2	r
(Romania) A Cruciat	1	3
(Australia) P Luczak	6	6
(Argentina) M Alund	6	0	6
(Germany) D Kindlmann	3	6	4
WC	(Bulgaria) G Dimitrov	6^{5}	3
2	(Belgium) S Darcis	7	6

Second round
6	(France) M Montcourt	5	1
PR	(Germany) F Mayer	7	6
(Germany) M Bachinger	1	4
4	(Belgium) O Rochus	6	6
7	(Czech Republic) L Rosol	6	7
(Australia) P Luczak	2	6^{3}
(Argentina) M Alund	6^{1}	3
2	(Belgium) S Darcis	7	6

Quarterfinals
PR	(Germany) F Mayer	6	6
4	(Belgium) O Rochus	4	3
7	(Czech Republic) L Rosol	4	4
2	(Belgium) S Darcis	6	6

Semifinals
PR	(Germany) F Mayer	6	4	6
2	(Belgium) S Darcis	3	6	2
