= 2010 Palm Hills International Tennis Challenger – Singles =

Singles
- 2010 Palm Hills International Tennis Challenger

Final
- Champion: (Czech Republic) Ivo Minář
- Runner-up: (Italy) Simone Vagnozzi
- Score: 3–6, 6–2, 6–3

Events
Singles	Doubles
← 2009 ·	Palm Hills International Tennis Challenger	· 2011 →

Ivo Minář won in the final 3–6, 6–2, 6–3, against Simone Vagnozzi.

== Seeds ==
1. (Jamaica) Dustin Brown (second round)
2. (Belgium) Christophe Rochus (semifinals)
3. (France) Édouard Roger-Vasselin (first round)
4. (Argentina) Juan Pablo Brzezicki (second round)
5. (Belgium) Niels Desein (second round)
6. (Germany) Andre Begemann (second round)
7. (France) Jonathan Dasnières de Veigy (quarterfinals)
8. (Germany) Bastian Knittel (quarterfinals)

== Draw ==
=== Key ===
- Q = Qualifier
- WC = Wild card
- LL = Lucky loser
- Alt = Alternate
- SE = Special exempt
- PR = Protected ranking
- ITF = ITF entry
- JE = Junior exempt
- w/o = Walkover
- r = Retired
- d = Defaulted
- SR = Special ranking

=== Finals ===
Semifinals
(Spain) Guillermo Olaso	7	4	1
(Italy) Simone Vagnozzi	6^{4}	6	6
(Czech Republic) Ivo Minář	6	6
2	(Belgium) Christophe Rochus	2	3

Final
(Italy) Simone Vagnozzi	6	2	3
(Czech Republic) Ivo Minář	3	6	6

=== Top half ===
First round
1	(Jamaica) D Brown	6	6
(Spain) S Gutiérrez-Ferrol	1	4
WC	(Egypt) K Maamoun	6	1	5
(Spain) G Olaso	3	6	7
(Poland) J Janowicz	6	6
(Brazil) R Dutra da Silva	4	2
(Russia) A Kuznetsov	5	6^{6}
8	(Germany) B Knittel	7	7
4	(Argentina) JP Brzezicki	6	6
Q	(Serbia) N Ćirić	1	2
(Spain) G Trujillo-Soler	6	6
(Spain) J Checa-Calvo	2	4
Q	(Egypt) M Safwat	2	5
(Italy) S Vagnozzi	6	7
(France) É Prodon	3	5
6	(Germany) A Begemann	6	7

Second round
1	(Jamaica) D Brown	3	2
(Spain) G Olaso	6	6
(Poland) J Janowicz	6	3	2
8	(Germany) B Knittel	3	6	6
4	(Argentina) JP Brzezicki	4	2
(Spain) G Trujillo-Soler	6	6
(Italy) S Vagnozzi	6	6
6	(Germany) A Begemann	4	2

Quarterfinals
(Spain) G Olaso	7	4	6
8	(Germany) B Knittel	5	6	4
(Spain) G Trujillo-Soler	6	4	2
(Italy) S Vagnozzi	4	6	6

Semifinals
(Spain) G Olaso	7	4	1
(Italy) S Vagnozzi	6^{4}	6	6

=== Bottom half ===
First round
5	(Belgium) N Desein	7	6
(Argentina) J-P Amado	6^{5}	3
(Spain) C Poch-Gradin	6	5	3
WC	(Egypt) S Sabry	1	7	6
(Chile) J Aguilar	6	6
Q	(Spain) F Vicente	3	3
(Czech Republic) I Minář	6	6
3	(France) É Roger-Vasselin	4	3
7	(France) J Dasnières de Veigy	6	6
(Austria) M Slanar	2	2
(Spain) I Cervantes-Huegun	6	3	6
(Croatia) N Mektić	4	6	3
Q	(Romania) P-A Luncanu	6	6
WC	(Egypt) M Ezz	1	2
(Montenegro) G Tošić	0	6^{3}
2	(Belgium) C Rochus	6	7

Second round
5	(Belgium) N Desein	4	3
WC	(Egypt) S Sabry	6	6
(Chile) J Aguilar	2	6	3
(Czech Republic) I Minář	6	3	6
7	(France) J Dasnières de Veigy	6	3	6
(Spain) I Cervantes-Huegun	4	6	3
Q	(Romania) P-A Luncanu	3	2
2	(Belgium) C Rochus	6	6

Quarterfinals
WC	(Egypt) S Sabry	2	4
(Czech Republic) I Minář	6	6
7	(France) J Dasnières de Veigy	4	7	3
2	(Belgium) C Rochus	6	6^{4}	6

Semifinals
(Czech Republic) I Minář	6	6
2	(Belgium) C Rochus	2	3
