= 2009 Flea Market Cup – Doubles =

Doubles
- 2009 Flea Market Cup

Final
- Champions: (Latvia) Andis Juška (Russia) Dmitri Sitak
- Runners-up: (Chinese Taipei) Lee Hsin-han (Chinese Taipei) Yang Tsung-hua
- Score: 3–6, 6–3, [10–2]

Events
Singles	Doubles
← 2008 ·	Flea Market Cup	· 2010 →

Rik de Voest and Ashley Fisher were the defending champions, but only de Voest tried to defend his title.
He partnered with Frederik Nielsen. However, they lost to Andis Juška and Dmitri Sitak in the quarterfinal.
Juška and Sitak won this tournament, by defeating Lee Hsin-han and Yang Tsung-hua 3–6, 6–3, [10–2] in the final.

== Seeds ==
1. (Thailand) Sanchai Ratiwatana / (Thailand) Sonchat Ratiwatana (semifinals)
2. (South Africa) Rik de Voest / (Denmark) Frederik Nielsen (quarterfinals)
3. (Israel) Amir Hadad / (Israel) Harel Levy (quarterfinals)
4. (Australia) Sadik Kadir / (India) Purav Raja (semifinals)

== Draw ==
=== Key ===
- Q = Qualifier
- WC = Wild card
- LL = Lucky loser
- Alt = Alternate
- SE = Special exempt
- PR = Protected ranking
- ITF = ITF entry
- JE = Junior exempt
- w/o = Walkover
- r = Retired
- d = Defaulted
- SR = Special ranking

=== Draw ===
First round
1	(Thailand) Sa Ratiwatana (Thailand) So Ratiwatana	6	6
WC	(South Korea) S-j Cho (South Korea) S-w Noh	2	4
(Slovakia) M Kližan (Slovakia) L Lacko	6	6
(Czech Republic) D Lojda (Australia) M Matosevic	0	0
3	(Israel) A Hadad (Israel) H Levy	6	6^{5}	[10]
(Netherlands) I Sijsling (United States) T Widom	0	7	[6]
(Chinese Taipei) H-h Lee (Chinese Taipei) T-h Yang
(Germany) M Bachinger (Germany) T Kamke	w/o
WC	(South Korea) Y-j Kim (South Korea) D Yoo	6^{3}	1
(Australia) G Jones (Czech Republic) P Šnobel	7	6
(Slovakia) K Čapkovič (Slovakia) P Červenák	2	1
4	(Australia) S Kadir (India) P Raja	6	6
(Latvia) A Juška (Russia) D Sitak	7	6
WC	(South Korea) K-t Im (South Korea) S-y Kim Jr.	6^{1}	2
(India) P Amritraj (United States) A Kuznetsov	3	4
2	(Denmark) F Nielsen (South Africa) R de Voest	6	6

Quarterfinals
1	(Thailand) Sa Ratiwatana (Thailand) So Ratiwatana	6	6
(Slovakia) M Kližan (Slovakia) L Lacko	1	2
3	(Israel) A Hadad (Israel) H Levy	3	3
(Chinese Taipei) H-h Lee (Chinese Taipei) T-h Yang	6	6
(Australia) G Jones (Czech Republic) P Šnobel	3	2
4	(Australia) S Kadir (India) P Raja	6	6
(Latvia) A Juška (Russia) D Sitak	7	6
2	(Denmark) F Nielsen (South Africa) R de Voest	6^{4}	3

Semifinals
1	(Thailand) Sa Ratiwatana (Thailand) So Ratiwatana	3	2
(Chinese Taipei) H-h Lee (Chinese Taipei) T-h Yang	6	6
4	(Australia) S Kadir (India) P Raja	6	3	[12]
(Latvia) A Juška (Russia) D Sitak	3	6	[14]

Finals
(Chinese Taipei) H-h Lee (Chinese Taipei) T-h Yang	6	3	[2]
(Latvia) A Juška (Russia) D Sitak	3	6	[10]
