= 2009 Morocco Tennis Tour – Rabat – Singles =

Rabat – Singles
- 2009 Morocco Tennis Tour – Rabat

Final
- Champion: (France) Laurent Recouderc
- Runner-up: (Spain) Santiago Ventura
- Score: 6–0, 6–2

Events
Singles	Doubles
← 2008 ·	Morocco Tennis Tour – Rabat	· 2010 →

Thomaz Bellucci chose to not defend his 2009 title.
Laurent Recouderc won in the final 6–0, 6–2, against Santiago Ventura.

== Seeds ==
1. (Brazil) Marcos Daniel (second round)
2. (Spain) Pablo Andújar (second round)
3. (Czech Republic) Jiří Vaněk (second round)
4. (Romania) Victor Crivoi (semifinals)
5. (Spain) Rubén Ramírez Hidalgo (quarterfinals)
6. (Spain) Santiago Ventura (final)
7. (Peru) Luis Horna (first round)
8. (France) Adrian Mannarino (first round)

== Draw ==
=== Key ===
- Q = Qualifier
- WC = Wild card
- LL = Lucky loser
- Alt = Alternate
- ITF = ITF entry
- PR = Protected ranking
- SR = Special ranking
- SE = Special exempt
- JE = Junior exempt
- JR = Junior Accelerator Programme entrant
- CO = College Accelerator Programme entrant
- NG = Next Gen Accelerator Program entrant
- w/o = Walkover
- r = Retired
- d = Defaulted

=== Final four ===
Semifinals
(Peru) Iván Miranda	2	0
(France) Laurent Recouderc	6	6
4	(Romania) Victor Crivoi	6	4	1
6	(Spain) Santiago Ventura	4	6	6

Final
(France) Laurent Recouderc	6	6
6	(Spain) Santiago Ventura	0	2

=== Top half ===
First round
1	(Brazil) M Daniel	6	7
(Italy) A di Mauro	2	6^{4}
WC	(Morocco) R El Amrani	3	5
(Spain) D Muñoz-De La Nava	6	7
Q	(Czech Republic) J Hájek	5	6	6
(Italy) G Naso	7	1	2
(Peru) I Miranda	6	6
8	(France) A Mannarino	1	1
3	(Czech Republic) J Vaněk	6	6
(Germany) S Stadler	1	4
(Serbia) B Pašanski	3	6	5
(Spain) D Marrero	6	2	7
(Romania) A Cruciat	1	2
(France) L Recouderc	6	6
WC	(Morocco) M Ziadi	7	6
7	(Peru) L Horna	6^{6}	1

Second round
1	(Brazil) M Daniel	4	4
(Spain) D Muñoz-De La Nava	6	6
Q	(Czech Republic) J Hájek	7	4	1
(Peru) I Miranda	6^{5}	6	6
3	(Czech Republic) J Vaněk	0	6	3
(Spain) D Marrero	6	4	6
(France) L Recouderc	3	6	6
WC	(Morocco) M Ziadi	6	1	3

Quarterfinals
(Spain) D Muñoz-De La Nava	6	3	2
(Peru) I Miranda	3	6	6
(Spain) D Marrero	4	6	4
(France) L Recouderc	6	3	6

Semifinals
(Peru) I Miranda	2	0
(France) L Recouderc	6	6

=== Bottom half ===
First round
5	(Spain) R Ramírez Hidalgo	3	6	6
(Spain) P Riba	6	4	2
(Monaco) J-R Lisnard	0	4
Q	(Spain) C Poch-Gradin	6	6
Q	(Spain) I Cervantes-Huegun	2	6	6
(Czech Republic) J Pospíšil	6	3	2
(Italy) G Petrazzuolo	3	6^{0}
4	(Romania) V Crivoi	6	7
6	(Spain) S Ventura	6	6
(Spain) MÁ López Jaén	3	3
WC	(Morocco) Y Idmbarek	3	1
(France) A Sidorenko	6	6
(Algeria) L Ouahab	6	6
WC	(Morocco) A Fattar	2	1
Q	(Italy) A Brizzi	4	2
2	(Spain) P Andújar	6	6

Second round
5	(Spain) R Ramírez Hidalgo	6	5	6
Q	(Spain) C Poch-Gradin	2	7	3
Q	(Spain) I Cervantes-Huegun	1	2
4	(Romania) V Crivoi	6	6
6	(Spain) S Ventura	6	6
(France) A Sidorenko	2	4
(Algeria) L Ouahab	3	6	1
2	(Spain) P Andújar	6	0	0^{r}

Quarterfinals
5	(Spain) R Ramírez Hidalgo	4	2
4	(Romania) V Crivoi	6	6
6	(Spain) S Ventura	6	7
(Algeria) L Ouahab	2	6^{4}

Semifinals
4	(Romania) V Crivoi	6	4	1
6	(Spain) S Ventura	4	6	6
