= 2012 Morocco Tennis Tour – Rabat – Singles =

Rabat – Singles
- 2012 Morocco Tennis Tour – Rabat

Final
- Champion: (Slovakia) Martin Kližan
- Runner-up: (Italy) Filippo Volandri
- Score: 6–3, 6–2

Events
Singles	Doubles
- Morocco Tennis Tour – Rabat

Ivo Minář is the defending champion.
Martin Kližan won the title after defeating Filippo Volandri 6–3, 6–2 in the final.

== Seeds ==
1. (Italy) Filippo Volandri (finals)
2. (Spain) Pere Riba (quarterfinals)
3. (Romania) Adrian Ungur (second round)
4. (Spain) Daniel Gimeno Traver (second round)
5. (Austria) Andreas Haider-Maurer (withdrew due to a left ankle injury)
6. (Slovakia) Martin Kližan (champion)
7. (France) Stéphane Robert (quarterfinals)
8. (Italy) Alessandro Giannessi (second round)

== Draw ==
Key

- Q = Qualifier
- WC = Wild card
- LL = Lucky loser
- Alt = Alternate
- ITF = ITF entry
- PR = Protected ranking
- SR = Special ranking
- SE = Special exempt
- JE = Junior exempt
- JR = Junior Accelerator Programme entrant
- CO = College Accelerator Programme entrant
- NG = Next Gen Accelerator Program entrant
- w/o = Walkover
- r = Retired
- d = Defaulted

=== Finals ===
Semifinals
1	(Italy) Filippo Volandri	2	6	6
(Russia) Andrey Kuznetsov	6	4	2
6	(Slovakia) Martin Kližan	6	6
(Germany) Simon Greul	4	4

Final
1	(Italy) Filippo Volandri	2	3
6	(Slovakia) Martin Kližan	6	6

=== Top half ===
First round
1	(Italy) F Volandri	6	7
(France) M Gicquel	3	5
LL	(Romania) V Crivoi	6^{4}	4
(Spain) A Menéndez	7^{7}	6
(Portugal) J Sousa	6	6
(Czech Republic) I Minář	3	2
Q	(Germany) B Knittel	4	5
7	(France) S Robert	6	7
3	(Romania) A Ungur	5	6	1
(Czech Republic) D Lojda	7	2	0^{r}
WC	(Algeria) L Ouahab	7	6
Q	(Slovenia) Janez Semrajč	5	3
(Argentina) F Delbonis	1	5
(Russia) A Kuznetsov	6	7
(Spain) D Muñoz de la Nava	6	6
Q	(Italy) A di Mauro	3	3

Second round
1	(Italy) F Volandri	6	6
(Spain) A Menéndez	1	2
(Portugal) J Sousa	5	6^{3}
7	(France) S Robert	7	7^{7}
3	(Romania) A Ungur	1	4
WC	(Algeria) L Ouahab	6	6
(Russia) A Kuznetsov	5	6	6
(Spain) D Muñoz de la Nava	7	1	3

Quarterfinals
1	(Italy) F Volandri	6	6
7	(France) S Robert	3	4
WC	(Algeria) L Ouahab	2	2
(Russia) A Kuznetsov	6	6

Semifinals
1	(Italy) F Volandri	2	6	6
(Russia) A Kuznetsov	6	4	2

=== Bottom half ===
First round
6	(Slovakia) M Kližan	6	7^{7}
(France) J Dasnières de Veigy	1	6^{5}
(Spain) P Carreño Busta	6^{5}	5
(Russia) E Donskoy	7^{7}	7
LL	(Spain) G Olaso	6	6
WC	(Morocco) M Ziadi	2	3
Q	(Italy) A Brizzi	6^{4}	3
4	(Spain) D Gimeno Traver	7^{7}	6
8	(Italy) A Giannessi	6	6
WC	(Morocco) Y Idmbarek	2	2
(Germany) S Greul	6	6
WC	(Morocco) Y Rachidi	1	0
(Slovenia) A Bedene	6	7
(Australia) J Duckworth	3	5
WC	(Spain) I Cervantes Huegun	6	6^{5}	1
2	(Spain) P Riba	2	7^{7}	6

Second round
6	(Slovakia) M Kližan	6	7
(Russia) E Donskoy	3	5
LL	(Spain) G Olaso	4	7	7
4	(Spain) D Gimeno Traver	6	5	5
8	(Italy) A Giannessi	2	6^{2}
(Germany) S Greul	6	7^{7}
(Slovenia) A Bedene	4	6^{3}
2	(Spain) P Riba	6	7^{7}

Quarterfinals
6	(Slovakia) M Kližan	6	6
LL	(Spain) G Olaso	0	2
(Germany) S Greul	6	5	6
2	(Spain) P Riba	3	7	3

Semifinals
6	(Slovakia) M Kližan	6	6
(Germany) S Greul	4	4
