= 2011 Morocco Tennis Tour – Rabat – Doubles =

Rabat – Doubles
- 2011 Morocco Tennis Tour – Rabat

Final
- Champions: (Italy) Alessio di Mauro; (Italy) Simone Vagnozzi
- Runners-up: (Kazakhstan) Evgeny Korolev; (Kazakhstan) Yuri Schukin
- Score: 6–4, 6–4

Events
Singles	Doubles
- Morocco Tennis Tour – Rabat

Ilija Bozoljac and Daniele Bracciali were the defending champions; however, they decided not to compete.
Alessio di Mauro and Simone Vagnozzi won the tournament after defeating Evgeny Korolev and Yuri Schukin 6–4, 6–4 in the final.

== Seeds ==
1. (United States) James Cerretani / (Canada) Adil Shamasdin (quarterfinals)
2. (Australia) Jordan Kerr / (Germany) Michael Kohlmann (semifinals)
3. (Italy) Alessio di Mauro / (Italy) Simone Vagnozzi (champions)
4. (Australia) Peter Luczak / (Italy) Alessandro Motti (quarterfinals)

== Draw ==
Key

- Q = Qualifier
- WC = Wild card
- LL = Lucky loser
- Alt = Alternate
- ITF = ITF entry
- PR = Protected ranking
- SR = Special ranking
- SE = Special exempt
- JE = Junior exempt
- JR = Junior Accelerator Programme entrant
- CO = College Accelerator Programme entrant
- NG = Next Gen Accelerator Program entrant
- w/o = Walkover
- r = Retired
- d = Defaulted

=== Draw ===
First round

Quarterfinals

Semifinals

Finals

1
- (United States) J Cerretani
- (Canada) A Shamasdin
6
6

WC
(Morocco) H Khaddari
(Morocco) Younès Rachidi
2
0

1
- (United States) J Cerretani
- (Canada) A Shamasdin
4
5

- (Argentina) F Delbonis
- (Spain) C Poch-Gradin
7
6^{2}
[3]

- (Romania) V Crivoi
- (Slovakia) M Kližan
6
7

- (Romania) V Crivoi
- (Slovakia) M Kližan
5
7
[10]

- (Romania) V Crivoi
- (Slovakia) M Kližan
4
3

3
- (Italy) A di Mauro
- (Italy) S Vagnozzi

3
- (Italy) A di Mauro
- (Italy) S Vagnozzi
6
6

WC
- (Morocco) R El Amrani
- (Morocco) A Fattar
w/o

3
- (Italy) A di Mauro
- (Italy) S Vagnozzi

- (Czech Republic) D Lojda
- (France) B Paire
w/o

- (Czech Republic) L Friedl
- (Czech Republic) J Pospíšil
w/o

- (Czech Republic) L Friedl
- (Czech Republic) J Pospíšil

3
- (Italy) A di Mauro
- (Italy) S Vagnozzi
6
6

- (Czech Republic) I Minář
- (Slovakia) M Semjan
4
3

- (Kazakhstan) E Korolev
- (Kazakhstan) Y Schukin
4
4

- (Kazakhstan) E Korolev
- (Kazakhstan) Y Schukin
6
6

- (Kazakhstan) E Korolev
- (Kazakhstan) Y Schukin
6^{2}
6
[10]

Alt
- (Spain) G Alcaide
- (Slovakia) I Klec
1
6^{5}

4
- (Australia) P Luczak
- (Italy) A Motti
7
4
[5]

4
- (Australia) P Luczak
- (Italy) A Motti
6
7

- (Kazakhstan) E Korolev
- (Kazakhstan) Y Schukin
6
3
[10]

WC
- (Morocco) Y Idmbarek
- (Algeria) L Ouahab
3
3

2
- (Australia) J Kerr
- (Germany) M Kohlmann
1
6
[6]

- (Germany) S Greul
- (Germany) B Knittel
6
6

- (Germany) S Greul
- (Germany) B Knittel
7
1
[6]

- (Netherlands) J Huta Galung
- (Portugal) R Machado
7
6^{6}
[1]

2
- (Australia) J Kerr
- (Germany) M Kohlmann
6^{5}
6
[10]

2
- (Australia) J Kerr
- (Germany) M Kohlmann
5
7
[10]
