= 2009 Morocco Tennis Tour – Rabat – Doubles =

Rabat – Doubles
- 2009 Morocco Tennis Tour – Rabat

Final
- Champions: (Spain) Rubén Ramírez Hidalgo; (Spain) Santiago Ventura
- Runners-up: (Germany) Michael Kohlmann; (Germany) Philipp Marx
- Score: 6–4, 7–6(5)

Events
Singles	Doubles
← 2008 ·	Morocco Tennis Tour – Rabat	· 2010 →

Guillermo García López and Mariano Hood were the defending champions; however, they chose to not participate this year.
Rubén Ramírez Hidalgo and Santiago Ventura won in the final 6–4, 7–6(5), against Michael Kohlmann and Philipp Marx.

== Seeds ==
1. (Germany) Michael Kohlmann / (Germany) Philipp Marx (final)
2. (Spain) Rubén Ramírez Hidalgo / (Spain) Santiago Ventura (champions)
3. (Brazil) Marcos Daniel / (Germany) Frank Moser (first round)
4. (Spain) Miguel Ángel López Jaén / (Spain) Daniel Muñoz de la Nava (semifinals)

== Draw ==
=== Key ===
- Q = Qualifier
- WC = Wild card
- LL = Lucky loser
- Alt = Alternate
- ITF = ITF entry
- PR = Protected ranking
- SR = Special ranking
- SE = Special exempt
- JE = Junior exempt
- JR = Junior Accelerator Programme entrant
- CO = College Accelerator Programme entrant
- NG = Next Gen Accelerator Program entrant
- w/o = Walkover
- r = Retired
- d = Defaulted

=== Draw ===
First round

Quarterfinals

Semifinals

Finals

1
- (Germany) M Kohlmann
- (Germany) P Marx
6^{2}
6
[10]

- (Spain) C Poch Gradin
- (Spain) P Riba
7
2
[5]

1
- (Germany) M Kohlmann
- (Germany) P Marx
6
6

WC
- (Morocco) R El Amrani
- (Morocco) A Fattar
5
4

- (France) L Recouderc
- (France) A Sidorenko
4
0

- (France) L Recouderc
- (France) A Sidorenko
7
6

1
- (Germany) M Kohlmann
- (Germany) P Marx
7
7

4
- (Spain) MÁ López Jaén
6
6

4
- (Spain) MÁ López Jaén
5
5

- (France) O Charroin
- (France) A Mannarino
1
2

4
- (Spain) MÁ López Jaén
6
6

WC
- (Morocco) R Chaki
- (Morocco) Y Idmbarek
2
6
[10]

WC
- (Morocco) R Chaki
- (Morocco) Y Idmbarek
2
0

- (Italy) A Motti
- (Italy) G Petrazzuolo
6
3
[8]

1
- (Germany) M Kohlmann
- (Germany) P Marx
4
6^{5}

- (Peru) L Horna
- (Peru) I Miranda
4
7
[7]

2
- (Spain) R Ramírez Hidalgo
- (Spain) S Ventura
6
7

- (Czech Republic) D Karol
- (Czech Republic) J Pospíšil
6
5
[10]

- (Czech Republic) D Karol
- (Czech Republic) J Pospíšil
6
5
[8]

- (Spain) D Marrero
- (Algeria) L Ouahab
1
6
[10]

- (Spain) D Marrero
- (Algeria) L Ouahab
1
7
[10]

3
- (Brazil) M Daniel
- (Germany) F Moser
6
2
[6]

- (Spain) D Marrero
- (Algeria) L Ouahab
4
2

- (Greece) K Economidis
- (Czech Republic) J Vaněk
6
6

2
- (Spain) R Ramírez Hidalgo
- (Spain) S Ventura
6
6

WC
- (Morocco) M Saber
- (Morocco) M Ziadi
2
1

- (Greece) K Economidis
- (Czech Republic) J Vaněk
6^{4}
1

- (Romania) A Cruciat
- (Serbia) B Pašanski
3
4

2
- (Spain) R Ramírez Hidalgo
- (Spain) S Ventura
7
6

2
- (Spain) R Ramírez Hidalgo
- (Spain) S Ventura
6
6
