= Sitak =

Sitak (Russian: Ситак) is a Russian surname. Notable people with the surname include:

- Artem Sitak (born 1986), New Zealand tennis player, younger brother of Dmitri
- Dmitri Sitak (born 1983), Russian tennis player, older brother of Artem
