= 2011 Morocco Tennis Tour – Rabat =

- Date: 14–20 March
- Edition: 5th
- Location: Rabat, Morocco

Champions

Singles
- (Czech Republic) Ivo Minář

Doubles
- (Italy) Alessio di Mauro / (Italy) Simone Vagnozzi
- Morocco Tennis Tour – Rabat

The 2011 Morocco Tennis Tour – Rabat was a professional tennis tournament played on clay courts. It was the fifth edition of the tournament which is part of the 2011 ATP Challenger Tour. It took place in Rabat, Morocco between 14 and 20 March 2011.

== ATP entrants ==
=== Seeds ===
Country	Player	Rank^{1}	Seed
POR	Rui Machado	94	1
CZE	Jan Hájek	98	2
ESP	Albert Ramos	110	3
CZE	Jaroslav Pospíšil	111	4
NED	Jesse Huta Galung	113	5
FRA	Benoît Paire	117	6
GER	Simon Greul	123	7
KAZ	Yuri Schukin	125	8

- Rankings are as of March 7, 2011.

=== Other entrants ===
The following players received wildcards into the singles main draw:

- (Morocco) Yassine Idmbarek
- (Tunisia) Malek Jaziri
- (Morocco) Hicham Khaddari
- (Morocco) Younès Rachidi

The following players received entry from the qualifying draw:

- (Sweden) Christian Lindell
- (France) Maxime Teixeira
- (France) Jonathan Dasnières de Veigy
- (Spain) Pablo Carreño Busta

== Champions ==
=== Singles ===
(Czech Republic) Ivo Minář def. (Australia) Peter Luczak, 7–5, 6–3

=== Doubles ===
(Italy) Alessio di Mauro / (Italy) Simone Vagnozzi def. (Kazakhstan) Evgeny Korolev / (Kazakhstan) Yuri Schukin, 6–4, 6–4
