= 2010 Palm Hills International Tennis Challenger – Doubles =

Doubles
- 2010 Palm Hills International Tennis Challenger

Final
- Champions: (Austria) Martin Slanar (Italy) Simone Vagnozzi
- Runners-up: (Germany) Andre Begemann (Jamaica) Dustin Brown
- Score: 6–3, 6–4

Events
Singles	Doubles
- Palm Hills International Tennis Challenger

Martin Slanar and Simone Vagnozzi defeated 6–3, 6–4 Andre Begemann and Dustin Brown in the final.

== Seeds ==
1. (Austria) Martin Slanar / (Italy) Simone Vagnozzi (champions)
2. (Germany) Andre Begemann / (Jamaica) Dustin Brown (final)
3. (Argentina) Juan Pablo Brzezicki / (Brazil) Rogerio Dutra da Silva (first round)
4. (Chile) Jorge Aguilar / (Spain) Gabriel Trujillo-Soler (semifinals)

== Draw ==
Key

- Q = Qualifier
- WC = Wild card
- LL = Lucky loser
- Alt = Alternate
- ITF = ITF entry
- PR = Protected ranking
- SR = Special ranking
- SE = Special exempt
- JE = Junior exempt
- JR = Junior Accelerator Programme entrant
- CO = College Accelerator Programme entrant
- NG = Next Gen Accelerator Program entrant
- w/o = Walkover
- r = Retired
- d = Defaulted

=== Draw ===
First round
1	(Austria) M Slanar (Italy) S Vagnozzi	4	6	[10]
(Belgium) N Desein (Romania) P-A Luncanu	6	1	[5]
(Argentina) J-P Amado (Brazil) R Grilli	6	1	[1]
(Egypt) O Hedayet (Egypt) M Safwat	4	6	[10]
4	(Chile) J Aguilar (Spain) G Trujillo-Soler	6	6
(Poland) J Janowicz (Russia) A Kuznetsov	4	4
(Germany) B Knittel (Croatia) N Mektić	6	6
WC	(Egypt) Y Adel (Egypt) M Moussa	4	3
(Egypt) M Ezz (Spain) F Vicente	4	3
(France) J Dasnières de Veigy (France) É Roger-Vasselin	6	6
(Serbia) N Ćirić (Montenegro) G Tošić	6	6
3	(Argentina) JP Brzezicki (Brazil) R Dutra da Silva	3	2
(Spain) I Cervantes-Huegun (Spain) C Poch-Gradin	6^{6}	4
(Spain) J Checa-Calvo (Spain) G Olaso	7	6
(Egypt) K Maamoun (Egypt) S Sabry	4	7	[5]
2	(Germany) A Begemann (Jamaica) D Brown	6	6^{2}	[10]

Quarterfinals
1	(Austria) M Slanar (Italy) S Vagnozzi	3	7	[10]
(Egypt) O Hedayet (Egypt) M Safwat	6	6^{6}	[8]
4	(Chile) J Aguilar (Spain) G Trujillo-Soler	6	3	[10]
(Germany) B Knittel (Croatia) N Mektić	3	6	[8]
(France) J Dasnières de Veigy (France) É Roger-Vasselin	6	3	[7]
(Serbia) N Ćirić (Montenegro) G Tošić	4	6	[10]
(Spain) J Checa-Calvo (Spain) G Olaso	2	2
2	(Germany) A Begemann (Jamaica) D Brown	6	6

Semifinals
1	(Austria) M Slanar (Italy) S Vagnozzi	6	6
4	(Chile) J Aguilar (Spain) G Trujillo-Soler	1	2
(Serbia) N Ćirić (Montenegro) G Tošić	1	3
2	(Germany) A Begemann (Jamaica) D Brown	6	6

Finals
1	(Austria) M Slanar (Italy) S Vagnozzi	6	6
2	(Germany) A Begemann (Jamaica) D Brown	3	4
