= 2012 Morocco Tennis Tour – Rabat – Doubles =

Rabat – Doubles
- 2012 Morocco Tennis Tour – Rabat

Final
- Champions: (Spain) Íñigo Cervantes Huegun (Argentina) Federico Delbonis
- Runners-up: (Slovakia) Martin Kližan (France) Stéphane Robert
- Score: 6–7^{(3–7)}, 6–1, [10–5]

Events
Singles	Doubles
- Morocco Tennis Tour – Rabat

Alessio di Mauro and Simone Vagnozzi were the defending champions but Vagnozzi decided not to participate.
di Mauro played alongside Alessandro Motti.
Íñigo Cervantes Huegun and Federico Delbonis won the title after defeating Martin Kližan and Stéphane Robert 6–7^{(3–7)}, 6–1, [10–5] in the final.

== Seeds ==
1. (Italy) Alessio di Mauro / (Italy) Alessandro Motti (semifinals)
2. (Spain) Daniel Gimeno Traver / (Spain) Gerard Granollers (semifinals)
3. (Belarus) Aliaksandr Bury / (Poland) Mateusz Kowalczyk (first round)
4. (Slovakia) Martin Kližan / (France) Stéphane Robert (final)

== Draw ==
Key

- Q = Qualifier
- WC = Wild card
- LL = Lucky loser
- Alt = Alternate
- ITF = ITF entry
- PR = Protected ranking
- SR = Special ranking
- SE = Special exempt
- JE = Junior exempt
- JR = Junior Accelerator Programme entrant
- CO = College Accelerator Programme entrant
- NG = Next Gen Accelerator Program entrant
- w/o = Walkover
- r = Retired
- d = Defaulted

=== Draw ===
First round
1	(Italy) A di Mauro (Italy) A Motti	6	6
WC	(Morocco) M Saber (Morocco) M Ziadi	3	1
WC	(Algeria) L Ouahab (Morocco) Y Rachidi	2	6^{4}
Alt	(Germany) B Knittel (Germany) J-L Struff	6	7^{7}
4	(Slovakia) M Kližan (France) S Robert	6	6
(Romania) V Crivoi (Romania) A Ungur	1	2
WC	(Morocco) O Erramy (Morocco) Y Idmbarek	2	7^{7}	[10]
(Germany) S Greul (Spain) A Menéndez	6	6^{4}	[12]
(France) J Dasnières de Veigy (France) M Gicquel	6	4	[1]
(Spain) I Cervantes Huegun (Argentina) F Delbonis	2	6	[10]
Alt	(Italy) Andrea Arnaboldi (Italy) G Naso	6	6
3	(Belarus) A Bury (Poland) M Kowalczyk	1	1
(Italy) A Giannessi (Spain) P Riba	6^{1}	4
(Spain) P Carreño Busta (Spain) G Olaso	7^{7}	6
(Czech Republic) D Lojda (Portugal) J Sousa	6^{4}	4
2	(Spain) D Gimeno Traver (Spain) G Granollers	7^{7}	6

Quarterfinals
1	(Italy) A di Mauro (Italy) A Motti	3	6	[10]
Alt	(Germany) B Knittel (Germany) J-L Struff	6	3	[4]
4	(Slovakia) M Kližan (France) S Robert	7^{7}	6
(Germany) S Greul (Spain) A Menéndez	6^{4}	2
(Spain) I Cervantes Huegun (Argentina) F Delbonis	3
Alt	(Italy) A Arnaboldi (Italy) G Naso	1^{r}
(Spain) P Carreño Busta (Spain) G Olaso	6	6^{6}	[3]
2	(Spain) D Gimeno Traver (Spain) G Granollers	4	7^{8}	[10]

Semifinals
1	(Italy) A di Mauro (Italy) A Motti	6^{4}	2
4	(Slovakia) M Kližan (France) S Robert	7^{7}	6
(Spain) I Cervantes Huegun (Argentina) F Delbonis	6	7^{10}
2	(Spain) D Gimeno Traver (Spain) G Granollers	3	6^{8}

Final
4	(Slovakia) M Kližan (France) S Robert	7^{7}	1	[5]
(Spain) I Cervantes Huegun (Argentina) F Delbonis	6^{3}	6	[10]
