= 2010 Morocco Tennis Tour – Rabat – Singles =

Rabat – Singles
- 2010 Morocco Tennis Tour – Rabat

Final
- Champion: (Spain) Rubén Ramírez Hidalgo
- Runner-up: (Spain) Marcel Granollers
- Score: 6–4, 6–4

Events
Singles	Doubles
- Morocco Tennis Tour – Rabat

Laurent Recouderc was the defending champion, but he lost to Bastian Knittel in the second round.
Rubén Ramírez Hidalgo won in the final 6–4, 6–4, against her compatriot Marcel Granollers.

== Seeds ==
1. (Ukraine) Oleksandr Dolgopolov Jr. (second round)
2. (Spain) Santiago Ventura (first round)
3. (Slovenia) Blaž Kavčič (quarterfinals)
4. (Russia) Teymuraz Gabashvili (first round)
5. (Spain) Marcel Granollers (final)
6. (Romania) Victor Crivoi (second round)
7. (Spain) Pere Riba (first round)
8. (Portugal) Rui Machado (semifinals)

== Draw ==
Key

- Q = Qualifier
- WC = Wild card
- LL = Lucky loser
- Alt = Alternate
- ITF = ITF entry
- PR = Protected ranking
- SR = Special ranking
- SE = Special exempt
- JE = Junior exempt
- JR = Junior Accelerator Programme entrant
- CO = College Accelerator Programme entrant
- NG = Next Gen Accelerator Program entrant
- w/o = Walkover
- r = Retired
- d = Defaulted

=== Finals ===
Semifinals
5	(Spain) Marcel Granollers	6	6
8	(Portugal) Rui Machado	2	2
Q	(Germany) Bastian Knittel	3	5
(Spain) Rubén Ramírez Hidalgo	6	7

Final
5	(Spain) Marcel Granollers	4	4
(Spain) Rubén Ramírez Hidalgo	6	6

=== Top half ===
First round
1	(Ukraine) O Dolgopolov Jr.	7	6
(Spain) A Martín	5	3
(Serbia) I Bozoljac	6	7
WC	(Morocco) M Ziadi	2	6^{0}
(France) A Sidorenko	1	6^{1}
(France) T Ascione	6	7
WC	(Morocco) H Khaddari	2	0
5	(Spain) M Granollers	6	6
4	(Russia) T Gabashvili	6	2	4
Q	(Portugal) J Sousa	3	6	6
(Germany) D Meffert	4	6^{3}
(Spain) I Navarro	6	7
WC	(Morocco) R Chaki	3	2
(Italy) F Volandri	6	6
(Spain) D Marrero	4	0
8	(Portugal) R Machado	6	6

Second round
1	(Ukraine) O Dolgopolov Jr.	4	1
(Serbia) I Bozoljac	6	6
(France) T Ascione	2	4
5	(Spain) M Granollers	6	6
Q	(Portugal) J Sousa	2	4
(Spain) I Navarro	6	6
(Italy) F Volandri	1	r
8	(Portugal) R Machado	6

Quarterfinals
(Serbia) I Bozoljac	0	3
5	(Spain) M Granollers	6	6
(Spain) I Navarro	6	0	1
8	(Portugal) R Machado	4	6	6

Semifinals
5	(Spain) M Granollers	6	6
8	(Portugal) R Machado	2	2

=== Bottom half ===
First round
7	(Spain) P Riba	3	6	4
(France) L Recouderc	6	2	6
Q	(Germany) B Knittel	6	7
Q	(Italy) A Arnaboldi	4	6^{1}
(Ukraine) I Sergeyev	6	6
(Algeria) L Ouahab	4	2
(Romania) A Ungur	3	1
3	(Slovenia) B Kavčič	6	6
6	(Romania) V Crivoi	4	6	6
WC	(Morocco) R El Amrani	6	2	4
(Spain) R Ramírez Hidalgo	6	6
(Spain) A Ramos-Viñolas	1	3
(Italy) S Bolelli	4	3
Q	(Spain) A Menéndez-Maceiras	6	6
(Spain) P Andújar	6	6
2	(Spain) S Ventura	4	1

Second round
(France) L Recouderc	7	6^{7}	2
Q	(Germany) B Knittel	5	7	6
(Ukraine) I Sergeyev	7	4	5
3	(Slovenia) B Kavčič	6^{2}	6	7
6	(Romania) V Crivoi	7	3	2
(Spain) R Ramírez Hidalgo	5	6	6
Q	(Spain) A Menéndez-Maceiras	6	6
(Spain) P Andújar	3	4

Quarterfinals
Q	(Germany) B Knittel	6	6
3	(Slovenia) B Kavčič	2	2
(Spain) R Ramírez Hidalgo	6	6
Q	(Spain) A Menéndez-Maceiras	4	2

Semifinals
Q	(Germany) B Knittel	3	5
(Spain) R Ramírez Hidalgo	6	7
