= 2009 Zagorka Cup – Doubles =

Doubles
- 2009 Zagorka Cup

Final
- Champions: (Slovakia) Dominik Hrbatý (Czech Republic) David Škoch
- Runners-up: (United Kingdom) James Auckland (Australia) Peter Luczak
- Score: 6–2, 6–4

Events
Singles	Doubles
← 2008 ·	Zagorka Cup	· 2010 →

Dominik Hrbatý and David Škoch defeated 6–2, 6–4 James Auckland and Peter Luczak in the final. They became the first champions of this tournament.

== Seeds ==
1. (Australia) Paul Hanley / (United Kingdom) Jamie Murray (quarterfinals)
2. (Germany) Michael Kohlmann / (Croatia) Lovro Zovko (semifinals)
3. (Switzerland) Yves Allegro / (Romania) Horia Tecău (quarterfinals)
4. (Australia) Rameez Junaid / (Germany) Philipp Marx (first round)

== Draw ==
=== Key ===
- Q = Qualifier
- WC = Wild card
- LL = Lucky loser
- Alt = Alternate
- SE = Special exempt
- PR = Protected ranking
- ITF = ITF entry
- JE = Junior exempt
- w/o = Walkover
- r = Retired
- d = Defaulted
- SR = Special ranking

=== Draw ===
First round
1	(Australia) P Hanley (United Kingdom) J Murray	6	6
(Brazil) R Hocevar (Portugal) R Machado	1	1
(United Kingdom) J Auckland (Australia) P Luczak	6	6
(France) M Montcourt (France) A Sidorenko	1	4
3	(Switzerland) Y Allegro (Romania) H Tecău	6	6
WC	(Bulgaria) T Grozdanov (Bulgaria) S Ivanov	1	2
(Germany) F Moser (Czech Republic) L Rosol	6	2	[7]
WC	(Bulgaria) V Mladenov (Bulgaria) I Traykov	3	6	[10]
(Greece) A Jakupovic (Romania) F Mergea	2	2
(Belgium) S Darcis (Belgium) N Desein	6	6
(Slovakia) D Hrbatý (Czech Republic) D Škoch	6	7
4	(Australia) R Junaid (Germany) P Marx	4	6^{7}
WC	(Bulgaria) V Dimov (Bulgaria) P Trendafilov	2	5
(Argentina) M Alund (Argentina) S Decoud	6	7
(Austria) P Oswald (Switzerland) J-C Scherrer	3	3
2	(Germany) M Kohlmann (Croatia) L Zovko	6	6

Quarterfinals
1	(Australia) P Hanley (United Kingdom) J Murray	4	5
(United Kingdom) J Auckland (Australia) P Luczak	6	7
3	(Switzerland) Y Allegro (Romania) H Tecău	6	6
WC	(Bulgaria) V Mladenov (Bulgaria) I Traykov	3	2
(Belgium) S Darcis (Belgium) N Desein	6^{6}	4
(Slovakia) D Hrbatý (Czech Republic) D Škoch	7	6
(Argentina) M Alund (Argentina) S Decoud	2	1
2	(Germany) M Kohlmann (Croatia) L Zovko	6	6

Semifinals
(United Kingdom) J Auckland (Australia) P Luczak	6^{3}	7	[10]
3	(Switzerland) Y Allegro (Romania) H Tecău	7	6^{3}	[8]
(Slovakia) D Hrbatý (Czech Republic) D Škoch	6	6
2	(Germany) M Kohlmann (Croatia) L Zovko	2	3

Finals
(United Kingdom) J Auckland (Australia) P Luczak	2	4
(Slovakia) D Hrbatý (Czech Republic) D Škoch	6	6
