= 2009 Mutua Madrileña Madrid Open – Men's singles =

Men's singles
- 2009 Mutua Madrileña Madrid Open

Final
- Champion: (Switzerland) Roger Federer
- Runner-up: (Spain) Rafael Nadal
- Score: 6–4, 6–4

Details
- Draw: 56
- Seeds: 16

Events
Singles	men	women
Doubles	men	women
- Mutua Madrileña Madrid Open

Roger Federer defeated Rafael Nadal in the final, 6–4, 6–4 to win the men's singles tennis title at the 2009 Madrid Open.

Andy Murray was the defending champion, but lost in the quarterfinals to Juan Martín del Potro.

The semifinal match between Nadal and Novak Djokovic was (at the time) the longest men's tennis match in the Open Era played with the best-of-three-sets system, stretching for 4 hours and 3 minutes with Nadal prevailing, 3–6, 7–6^{(7–5)}, 7–6^{(11–9)} after saving three match points in the third-set tiebreak. This record was later broken by Federer and del Potro at the 2012 London Olympics in their 4-hour and 26-minute semifinal match.

This was the first edition of the tournament to be held on outdoor clay courts, having previously been held on indoor hard courts.

== Seeds ==
The top eight seeds receive a bye into the second round.

1. (Spain) Rafael Nadal (final)
2. (Switzerland) Roger Federer (champion)
3. (Serbia) Novak Djokovic (semifinals)
4. (United Kingdom) Andy Murray (quarterfinals)
5. (Argentina) Juan Martín del Potro (semifinals)
6. (United States) Andy Roddick (quarterfinals)
7. (Spain) Fernando Verdasco (quarterfinals)
8. (France) Gilles Simon (third round)
9. (France) Jo-Wilfried Tsonga (second round)
10. (Russia) Nikolay Davydenko (third round, withdrew due to injury)
11. (Switzerland) Stan Wawrinka (third round)
12. (Spain) David Ferrer (second round)
13. (Croatia) Marin Čilić (second round)
14. (United States) James Blake (third round)
15. (Czech Republic) Radek Štěpánek (first round, retired due to a left knee injury)
16. (Spain) Tommy Robredo (third round)

== Draw ==
Key

- Q = Qualifier
- WC = Wild card
- LL = Lucky loser
- Alt = Alternate
- ITF = ITF entry
- PR = Protected ranking
- SR = Special ranking
- SE = Special exempt
- JE = Junior exempt
- JR = Junior Accelerator Programme entrant
- CO = College Accelerator Programme entrant
- NG = Next Gen Accelerator Program entrant
- w/o = Walkover
- r = Retired
- d = Defaulted

=== Finals ===
Quarterfinals
1	(Spain) Rafael Nadal	6	7
7	(Spain) Fernando Verdasco	4	5
3	(Serbia) Novak Djokovic	6	6
WC	(Croatia) Ivan Ljubičić	4	4
5	(Argentina) Juan Martín del Potro	7^{7}	6
4	(United Kingdom) Andy Murray	6^{4}	3
6	(United States) Andy Roddick	5	7^{7}	1
2	(Switzerland) Roger Federer	7	6^{5}	6

Semifinals
1	(Spain) Rafael Nadal	3	7^{7}	7^{11}
3	(Serbia) Novak Djokovic	6	6^{5}	6^{9}
5	(Argentina) Juan Martín del Potro	3	4
2	(Switzerland) Roger Federer	6	6

Final
1	(Spain) Rafael Nadal	4	4
2	(Switzerland) Roger Federer	6	6

=== Top half ===
==== Section 1 ====
First round
(Austria) J Melzer	4	7	6
(Spain) A Montañés	6	5	3
(Germany) P Kohlschreiber	6	6
(Spain) N Almagro	3	4
(Spain) M Granollers	2	7^{7}	1
13	(Croatia) M Čilić	6	6^{4}	6
12	(Spain) D Ferrer	6	6
Q	(Argentina) G Cañas	2	2
(Spain) F López	4	5
WC	(Argentina) J Mónaco	6	7
(Russia) I Kunitsyn	3	6	4
WC	(Spain) JC Ferrero	6	4	6

Second round
1	(Spain) R Nadal	6	6
(Austria) J Melzer	3	1
(Germany) P Kohlschreiber	6	6^{5}	7^{7}
13	(Croatia) M Čilić	1	7^{7}	6^{2}
12	(Spain) D Ferrer	4	4
WC	(Argentina) J Mónaco	6	6
WC	(Spain) JC Ferrero	3	2
7	(Spain) F Verdasco	6	6

Third round
1	(Spain) R Nadal	w/o
(Germany) P Kohlschreiber
WC	(Argentina) J Mónaco	5	2
7	(Spain) F Verdasco	7	6

Quarterfinals
1	(Spain) R Nadal	6	7
7	(Spain) F Verdasco	4	5

==== Section 2 ====
First round
WC	(Spain) Ó Hernández	6	6
(Argentina) M Vassallo Argüello	3	3
(Italy) A Seppi	7	6
Q	(Argentina) E Schwank	5	4
(United States) S Querrey	7^{7}	5
15	(Czech Republic) R Štěpánek	6^{2}	2^{r}
9	(France) J-W Tsonga	6	7
(Russia) M Safin	4	5
WC	(Croatia) I Ljubičić	6	6
Q	(Russia) T Gabashvili	3	2
(France) P-H Mathieu	7^{7}	4	0^{r}
Q	(Italy) F Fognini	6^{5}	6	3

Second round
3	(Serbia) N Djokovic	6	6
WC	(Spain) Ó Hernández	3	3
(Italy) A Seppi	6	4	6
(United States) S Querrey	3	6	4
9	(France) J-W Tsonga	4	5
WC	(Croatia) I Ljubičić	6	7
Q	(Italy) F Fognini	3	2
8	(France) G Simon	6	6

Third round
3	(Serbia) N Djokovic	6	6
(Italy) A Seppi	4	4
WC	(Croatia) I Ljubičić	3	6	6
8	(France) G Simon	6	4	3

Quarterfinals
3	(Serbia) N Djokovic	6	6
WC	(Croatia) I Ljubičić	4	4

=== Bottom half ===
==== Section 3 ====
First round
LL	(Spain) G García López	0	6^{5}
(Czech Republic) T Berdych	6	7^{7}
(France) J Chardy	6	6
(Argentina) J Acasuso	3	2
Q	(Italy) M Crugnola	2	0
11	(Switzerland) S Wawrinka	6	6
16	(Spain) T Robredo	3	6	6
(Germany) N Kiefer	6	2	2
(Serbia) J Tipsarević	6^{3}	4
(United States) M Fish	7^{7}	6
(Italy) S Bolelli	7	7^{7}
Q	(Argentina) JI Chela	5	6^{3}

Second round
5	(Argentina) JM del Potro	6	4
(Czech Republic) T Berdych	2	1^{r}
(France) J Chardy	4	5
11	(Switzerland) S Wawrinka	6	7
16	(Spain) T Robredo	3	7^{7}	6
(United States) M Fish	6	6^{5}	2
(Italy) S Bolelli	6^{9}	4
4	(United Kingdom) A Murray	7^{11}	6

Third round
5	(Argentina) JM del Potro	4	6	6
11	(Switzerland) S Wawrinka	6	4	4
16	(Spain) T Robredo	5	1
4	(United Kingdom) A Murray	7	6

Quarterfinals
5	(Argentina) JM del Potro	7^{7}	6
4	(United Kingdom) A Murray	6^{4}	3

==== Section 4 ====
First round
Q	(Germany) T Haas	6	5	7
(Latvia) E Gulbis	2	7	5
(Germany) R Schüttler	2	4
(France) F Serra	6	6
(Serbia) V Troicki	2	2
10	(Russia) N Davydenko	6	6
14	(United States) J Blake	6	6
(Romania) V Hănescu	2	4
(Croatia) I Karlović	3	7^{7}	6
(France) J Benneteau	6	6^{5}	4
(Sweden) R Söderling	6	6
LL	(Spain) I Navarro	4	2

Second round
6	(United States) A Roddick	1	7^{11}	6
Q	(Germany) T Haas	6	6^{9}	4
(France) F Serra	5	3
10	(Russia) N Davydenko	7	6
14	(United States) J Blake	6^{4}	6	7^{7}
(Croatia) I Karlović	7^{7}	4	6^{4}
(Sweden) R Söderling	1	5
2	(Switzerland) R Federer	6	7

Third round
6	(United States) A Roddick	w/o
10	(Russia) N Davydenko
14	(United States) J Blake	2	4
2	(Switzerland) R Federer	6	6

Quarterfinals
6	(United States) A Roddick	5	7^{7}	1
2	(Switzerland) R Federer	7	6^{5}	6

== Qualifying ==
=== Seeds ===
1. (Germany) Mischa Zverev (first round, retired due to leg injury)
2. (Russia) Teymuraz Gabashvili (qualified)
3. (Argentina) Eduardo Schwank (qualified)
4. (Spain) Guillermo García López (qualifying competition, lucky loser)
5. (Argentina) Máximo González (first round)
6. (Italy) Fabio Fognini (qualified)
7. (Germany) Tommy Haas (qualified)
8. (Spain) Daniel Gimeno Traver (first round)
9. (Spain) Iván Navarro (qualifying competition, lucky loser)
10. (Kazakhstan) Evgeny Korolev (qualifying competition)
11. (Spain) Pablo Andújar (qualifying competition)
12. (Chile) Nicolás Massú (first round)
13. (Spain) Alberto Martín (qualifying competition)
14. (Argentina) Guillermo Cañas (qualified)

=== Qualifiers ===
1. (Argentina) Guillermo Cañas
2. (Russia) Teymuraz Gabashvili
3. (Argentina) Eduardo Schwank
4. (Argentina) Juan Ignacio Chela
5. (Italy) Marco Crugnola
6. (Italy) Fabio Fognini
7. (Germany) Tommy Haas

=== Lucky losers ===
1. (Spain) Guillermo García López
2. (Spain) Iván Navarro

=== Qualifying draw ===
==== First qualifier ====
First round
1	(Germany) Mischa Zverev	4	1^{r}
(Italy) Flavio Cipolla	6	4
(Spain) Rubén Ramírez Hidalgo	1	4
14	(Argentina) Guillermo Cañas	6	6

Qualifying competition
(Italy) Flavio Cipolla	6	3	3
14	(Argentina) Guillermo Cañas	4	6	6

==== Second qualifier ====
First round
2	(Russia) Teymuraz Gabashvili	6	7^{7}
(Spain) David Marrero	4	6^{1}
Alt	(Serbia) Dušan Vemić	4	7	7^{7}
8	(Spain) Daniel Gimeno Traver	6	5	6^{5}

Qualifying competition
2	(Russia) Teymuraz Gabashvili	4	6	7^{7}
Alt	(Serbia) Dušan Vemić	6	4	6^{5}

==== Third qualifier ====
First round
3	(Argentina) Eduardo Schwank	6	6^{5}	6
(Switzerland) Michael Lammer	3	7^{7}	0
(Kazakhstan) Mikhail Kukushkin	2	3
10	(Kazakhstan) Evgeny Korolev	6	6

Qualifying competition
3	(Argentina) Eduardo Schwank	6	6
10	(Kazakhstan) Evgeny Korolev	2	2

==== Fourth qualifier ====
First round
4	(Spain) Guillermo García López	6	5	6
WC	(Spain) Fernando Vicente	2	7	4
(Argentina) Juan Ignacio Chela	6	6
12	(Chile) Nicolás Massú	3	4

Qualifying competition
4	(Spain) Guillermo García López	1	3
(Argentina) Juan Ignacio Chela	6	6

==== Fifth qualifier ====
First round
5	(Argentina) Máximo González	6	5	6^{5}
(Italy) Marco Crugnola	4	7	7^{7}
(Morocco) Lamine Ouahab	3	2
9	(Spain) Iván Navarro	6	6

Qualifying competition
(Italy) Marco Crugnola	1	6	6
9	(Spain) Iván Navarro	6	2	1

==== Sixth qualifier ====
First round
6	(Italy) Fabio Fognini	6^{1}	7^{8}	6
WC	(Spain) Marc López	7^{7}	6^{6}	3
(Czech Republic) Lukáš Dlouhý	4	6	2
13	(Spain) Alberto Martín	6	1	6

Qualifying competition
6	(Italy) Fabio Fognini	1	6	7^{11}
13	(Spain) Alberto Martín	6	3	6^{9}

==== Seventh qualifier ====
First round
7/WC	(Germany) Tommy Haas	6	6
WC	(Spain) Carlos Gómez-Herrera	2	1
(Italy) Alessio di Mauro	2	4
11	(Spain) Pablo Andújar	6	6

Qualifying competition
7/WC	(Germany) Tommy Haas	6	6
11	(Spain) Pablo Andújar	3	4
