= 2009 Flea Market Cup =

- Date: 2–8 November
- Edition: 7th
- Location: Chuncheon, South Korea

Champions

Singles
- (Chinese Taipei) Lu Yen-hsun

Doubles
- (Latvia) Andis Juška / (Russia) Dmitri Sitak
← 2008 ·	Flea Market Cup	· 2010 →

The 2009 Flea Market Cup was a professional tennis tournament played on outdoor hard courts. It was the seventh edition of the tournament which was part of Tretorn SERIE+ of the 2009 ATP Challenger Tour. It took place in Chuncheon, South Korea between 2 and 8 November 2009.

== ATP entrants ==
=== Seeds ===
Country	Player	Rank^{1}	Seed
NED	Thiemo de Bakker	111	1
TPE	Lu Yen-hsun	118	2
SVK	Lukáš Lacko	126	3
ISR	Harel Levy	138	4
KOR	Im Kyu-tae	163	5
AUS	Marinko Matosevic	174	6
RUS	Alex Kuznetsov	193	7
KOR	~~Lee Hyung-taik~~	~~211~~	~~8~~

- Rankings are as of October 26, 2009.

=== Other entrants ===
The following players received wildcards into the singles main draw:

- (South Korea) Cho Soong-jae
- (South Korea) Kim Sun-yong
- (South Korea) Lim Yong-kyu
- (South Korea) Noh Sang-woo

The following players received entry from the qualifying draw:

- (South Korea) Jun Woong-sun
- (Australia) Sadik Kadir
- (South Korea) Kim Young-jun
- (Japan) Hiroki Moriya (as a Lucky loser)
- (South Korea) Daniel Yoo

== Champions ==
=== Singles ===
(Chinese Taipei) Lu Yen-hsun def. (Netherlands) Igor Sijsling, 6–2, 6–3

=== Doubles ===
(Latvia) Andis Juška / (Russia) Dmitri Sitak def. (Chinese Taipei) Lee Hsin-han / (Chinese Taipei) Yang Tsung-hua, 3–6, 6–3, [10–2]
