= 2012 Morocco Tennis Tour – Rabat =

- Date: 12–18 March
- Edition: 6th
- Location: Rabat, Morocco

Champions

Singles
- (Slovakia) Martin Kližan

Doubles
- (Spain) Íñigo Cervantes Huegun / (Argentina) Federico Delbonis
- Morocco Tennis Tour – Rabat

The 2012 Morocco Tennis Tour – Rabat was a professional tennis tournament played on clay courts. It was the sixth edition of the tournament which was part of the 2012 ATP Challenger Tour. It took place in Rabat, Morocco between 12 and 18 March 2012.

== ATP entrants ==
=== Seeds ===
Country	Player	Rank^{1}	Seed
ITA	Filippo Volandri	69	1
ESP	Pere Riba	89	2
ROU	Adrian Ungur	98	3
ESP	Daniel Gimeno Traver	101	4
AUT	~~Andreas Haider-Maurer~~	111	5
SVK	Martin Kližan	118	6
FRA	Stéphane Robert	122	7
ITA	Alessandro Giannessi	136	8

- ^{1} Rankings are as of March 5, 2012.

=== Other entrants ===
The following players received wildcards into the singles main draw:

- (Morocco) Yassine Idmbarek
- (Algeria) Lamine Ouahab
- (Morocco) Younès Rachidi
- (Morocco) Mehdi Ziadi

The following players received entry as an alternate into the singles main draw:

- (Spain) Íñigo Cervantes Huegun

The following players received entry from the qualifying draw:

- (Italy) Alberto Brizzi
- (Italy) Alessio di Mauro
- (Germany) Bastian Knittel
- (Slovenia) Janez Semrajč

The following players received entry as a lucky loser into the singles main draw:

- (Romania) Victor Crivoi
- (Spain) Guillermo Olaso

== Champions ==
=== Singles ===
- (Slovakia) Martin Kližan def. (Italy) Filippo Volandri, 6–2, 6–3

=== Doubles ===
- (Spain) Íñigo Cervantes Huegun / (Argentina) Federico Delbonis def. (Slovakia) Martin Kližan / (France) Stéphane Robert, 6–7^{(3–7)}, 6–3, [10–5]
