= 2009 Zagorka Cup =

- Date: April 20 – April 26
- Edition: 1st
- Location: Sofia, Bulgaria

Champions

Singles
- (Czech Republic) Ivo Minář

Doubles
- (Slovakia) Dominik Hrbatý / (Czech Republic) David Škoch
Zagorka Cup	· 2010 →

The 2009 Zagorka Cup was a professional tennis tournament played on outdoor red clay courts. It was part of the 2009 ATP Challenger Tour. It took place in Sofia, Bulgaria between 20 and 26 April 2009.

== Singles main draw entrants ==
=== Seeds ===
Nationality	Player	Ranking*	Seeding
CZE	Ivo Minář	95	1
BEL	Steve Darcis	102	2
CRO	Roko Karanušić	121	3
BEL	Olivier Rochus	123	4
POR	Rui Machado	129	5
FRA	Mathieu Montcourt	135	6
CZE	Lukáš Rosol	140	7
GER	Daniel Brands	145	8

- Rankings are as of April 12, 2009.

=== Other entrants ===
The following players received wildcards into the singles main draw:

- (Bulgaria) Grigor Dimitrov
- (Bulgaria) Tihomir Grozdanov
- (Austria) Andreas Haider-Maurer
- (Czech Republic) Ivo Minář

The following players received entry from the qualifying draw:

- (Italy) Enrico Burzi
- (Greece) Konstantinos Economidis
- (Australia) Rameez Junaid
- (Netherlands) Matwé Middelkoop

== Champions ==
=== Men's singles ===
(Czech Republic) Ivo Minář def. (Germany) Florian Mayer, 6–4, 6–3.

=== Men's doubles ===
(Slovakia) Dominik Hrbatý / (Czech Republic) David Škoch def. (United Kingdom) James Auckland / (Australia) Peter Luczak, 6–2, 6–4.
