= 2010 Palm Hills International Tennis Challenger =

- Date: May 3 – May 8
- Edition: 15th
- Location: Cairo, Egypt

Champions

Singles
- (Czech Republic) Ivo Minář

Doubles
- (Austria) Martin Slanar / (Italy) Simone Vagnozzi
← 2009 ·	Palm Hills International Tennis Challenger	· 2011 →

The 2010 Palm Hills International Tennis Challenger was a professional tennis tournament played on red clay courts. It was part of the 2010 ATP Challenger Tour. It took place in Cairo, Egypt between May 3 and May 8, 2010. The event was absent from 2003 to 2009.

== Entrants ==
=== Seeds ===
Nationality	Player	Ranking*	Seeding
JAM	Dustin Brown	104	1
BEL	Christophe Rochus	132	2
FRA	Édouard Roger-Vasselin	136	3
ARG	Juan Pablo Brzezicki	176	4
BEL	Niels Desein	180	5
GER	Andre Begemann	193	6
FRA	Jonathan Dasnières de Veigy	204	7
GER	Bastian Knittel	227	8

- Rankings are as of April 26, 2010.

=== Other entrants ===
The following players received wildcards into the singles main draw:

- (Egypt) Mahmoud Ezz
- (Egypt) Karim Maamuon
- (Egypt) Sherif Sabry

The following players received entry from the qualifying draw:

- (Serbia) Nikola Ćirić
- (Romania) Petru-Alexandru Luncanu
- (Egypt) Mohamed Safwat
- (Spain) Fernando Vicente

== Champions ==
=== Singles ===
(Czech Republic) Ivo Minář def. (Italy) Simone Vagnozzi, 3–6, 6–2, 6–3

=== Doubles ===
(Austria) Martin Slanar / (Italy) Simone Vagnozzi def. (Germany) Andre Begemann / (Jamaica) Dustin Brown, 6–3, 6–4
