= 2009 Morocco Tennis Tour – Rabat =

- Date: March 9 – March 15
- Edition: 4th
- Location: Rabat, Morocco

Champions

Singles
- (France) Laurent Recouderc

Doubles
- (Spain) Rubén Ramírez Hidalgo / (Spain) Santiago Ventura
- Morocco Tennis Tour – Rabat

The 2009 Morocco Tennis Tour – Rabat was a professional tennis tournament played on outdoor red clay courts. It was part of the 2009 ATP Challenger Tour. It took place in Rabat, Morocco between 9 and 15 March 2009.

== Singles main-draw entrants ==
=== Seeds ===
Nationality	Player	Ranking*	Seeding
BRA	Marcos Daniel	86	1
ESP	Pablo Andújar	91	2
CZE	Jiří Vaněk	116	3
ROU	Victor Crivoi	123	4
ESP	Rubén Ramírez Hidalgo	124	5
ESP	Santiago Ventura	128	6
PER	Luis Horna	133	7
FRA	Adrian Mannarino	138	8

- Rankings are as of March 2, 2009.

=== Other entrants ===
The following players received wildcards into the singles main draw:

- (Morocco) Reda El Amrani
- (Morocco) Anas Fattar
- (Morocco) Yassine Idmbarek
- (Morocco) Mehdi Ziadi

The following players received entry from the qualifying draw:

- (Italy) Alberto Brizzi
- (Spain) Íñigo Cervantes Huegun
- (Spain) Carles Poch Gradin
- (Czech Republic) Jan Hájek

== Champions ==
=== Men's singles ===
(France) Laurent Recouderc def. (Spain) Santiago Ventura, 6–0, 6–2

=== Men's doubles ===
(Spain) Rubén Ramírez Hidalgo / (Spain) Santiago Ventura def. (Germany) Michael Kohlmann / (Germany) Philipp Marx, 6–4, 7–6(5)
