= 2010 Morocco Tennis Tour – Rabat =

- Date: March 8 – March 14
- Edition: 5th
- Location: Rabat, Morocco

Champions

Singles
- (Spain) Rubén Ramírez Hidalgo

Doubles
- (Serbia) Ilija Bozoljac / (Italy) Daniele Bracciali
- Morocco Tennis Tour – Rabat

The 2010 Morocco Tennis Tour – Rabat was a professional tennis tournament played on outdoor red clay courts. It was part of the 2010 ATP Challenger Tour. It took place in Rabat, Morocco between 9 and 15 March 2010.

== ATP entrants ==
=== Seeds ===
Nationality	Player	Ranking*	Seeding
UKR	Oleksandr Dolgopolov Jr.	81	1
ESP	Santiago Ventura	90	2
SLO	Blaž Kavčič	102	3
RUS	Teymuraz Gabashvili	109	4
ESP	Marcel Granollers	114	5
ROU	Victor Crivoi	115	6
ESP	Pere Riba	119	7
POR	Rui Machado	120	8

- Rankings are as of March 1, 2010.

=== Other entrants ===
The following players received wildcards into the singles main draw:

- (Morocco) Rabie Chaki
- (Morocco) Reda El Amrani
- (Morocco) Hicham Khaddari
- (Morocco) Mehdi Ziadi

The following players received entry from the qualifying draw:

- (Italy) Andrea Arnaboldi
- (Germany) Bastian Knittel
- (Spain) Adrián Menéndez Maceiras
- (Portugal) João Sousa

== Champions ==
=== Singles ===
(Spain) Rubén Ramírez Hidalgo def. (Spain) Marcel Granollers, 6–4, 6–4

=== Doubles ===
(Serbia) Ilija Bozoljac / (Italy) Daniele Bracciali def. (Ukraine) Oleksandr Dolgopolov Jr. / (Russia) Dmitri Sitak, 6–4, 6–4
