= Flea Market Cup =

ATP Challenger Tour
- Event name: Chuncheon
- Location: Busan, South Korea (2005–08); Chuncheon (2009-current)
- Venue: Songam International Tennis Court
- Category: ATP Challenger Tour, Tretorn SERIE+
- Surface: Hard
- Draw: 32S/32Q/16D
- Prize money: $100,000
- Website: www.kortennis.co.kr

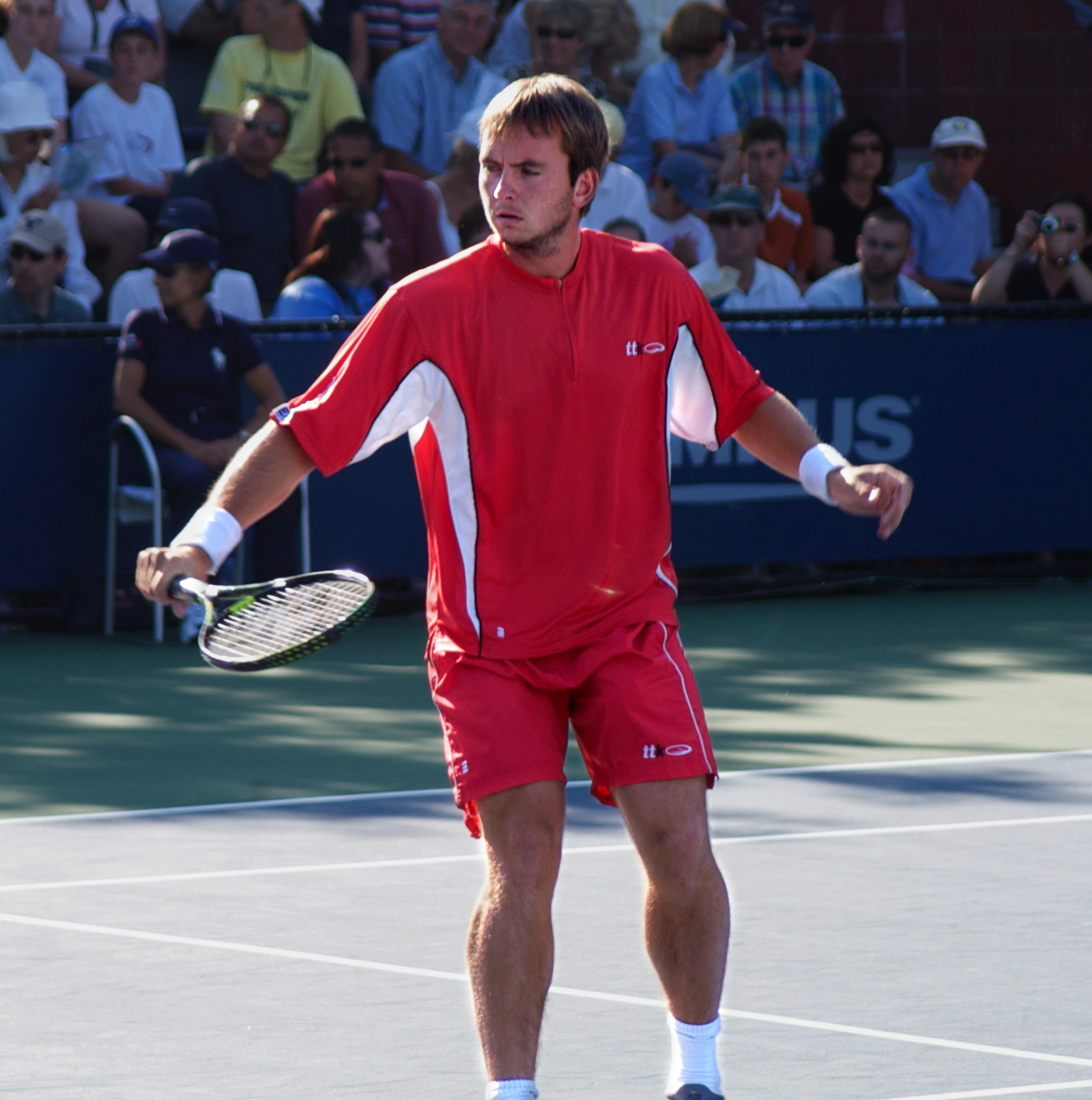
Czech Republic's Ivo Minář defeated Viktor Troicki in 2007, and Alex Bogomolov Jr. in 2008, winning back-to-back singles titles in Busan

The Flea Market Cup was a professional tennis tournament played on outdoor hardcourts. It was part of the ATP Challenger Tour. The tournament, which started in 2003, was held in Busan, South Korea during 2003–08, and the location was moved to Chuncheon in 2009. It was part of the Tretorn SERIE+ in 2009.

== Past finals ==
=== Singles ===
Year	Champion	Runner-up	Score
2010	Not Held		
2009	(Chinese Taipei) Lu Yen-hsun	(Netherlands) Igor Sijsling	6–2, 6–3
2008	(Czech Republic) Ivo Minář	(United States) Alex Bogomolov Jr.	6–0, 2–0 retired
2007	(Czech Republic) Ivo Minář	(Serbia) Viktor Troicki	7–6(2), 6–7(7), 6–3
2006	(Thailand) Danai Udomchoke	(United States) Paul Goldstein	6–2, 6–0
2005	(Germany) Björn Phau	(Germany) Simon Greul	6–1, 6–2
2004	(Austria) Alexander Peya	(Taiwan) Lu Yen-hsun	6–3, 5–7, 6–3
2003	(South Korea) Kim Young-jun	(Japan) Tasuku Iwami	6–3, 4–1, ret.

=== Doubles ===
Year	Champions	Runners-up	Score
2010	Not Held		
2009	(Latvia) Andis Juška (Russia) Dmitri Sitak	(Chinese Taipei) Lee Hsin-han (Chinese Taipei) Yang Tsung-hua	3–6, 6–3, 10–2
2008	(South Africa) Rik de Voest (Australia) Ashley Fisher	(Sweden) Johan Brunström (Netherlands Antilles) Jean-Julien Rojer	6–2, 2–6, 10–6
2007	(United States) Rajeev Ram (United States) Bobby Reynolds	(South Africa) Rik de Voest (Canada) Pierre-Ludovic Duclos	6–0, 6–2
2006	(Austria) Alexander Peya (Germany) Björn Phau	(Thailand) Sanchai Ratiwatana (Thailand) Sonchat Ratiwatana	6–7(3), 6–3, 10–6
2005	(Australia) Ashley Fisher (United States) Tripp Phillips	(Thailand) Sanchai Ratiwatana (Thailand) Sonchat Ratiwatana	7–5, 6–3
2004	(Thailand) Sanchai Ratiwatana (Thailand) Sonchat Ratiwatana	(Japan) Satoshi Iwabuchi (Japan) Tasuku Iwami	6–7(5), 7–6(1), 6–4
2003	(Japan) Toshihide Matsui (Japan) Michihisa Onoda	(South Korea) Baek Seung-bok (South Korea) Park Seung-kyu	6–1, 6–3
