= Zagorka Cup =

Defunct tennis tournament
- Event name: Sofia
- Location: Sofia, Bulgaria
- Category: ATP Challenger Tour
- Surface: Clay (red)
- Draw: 32S/32Q/16D
- Prize money: €85,000

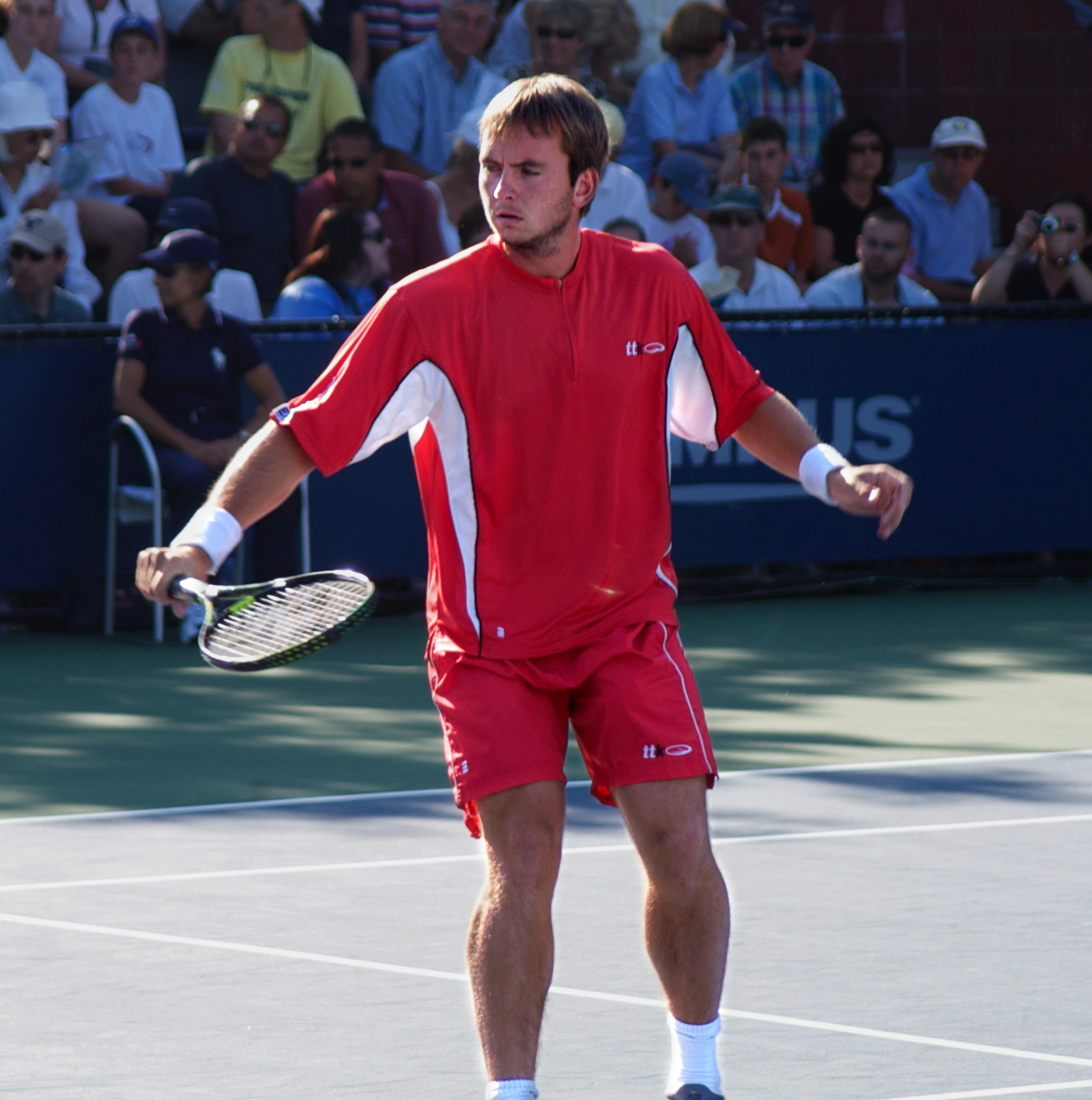
Czech Ivo Minář won his second Challenger singles title of 2009 over Florian Mayer in Sofia

The Zagorka Cup was a professional tennis tournament played on outdoor red clay courts. It was part of the Association of Tennis Professionals (ATP) Challenger Tour. It was held in Sofia, Bulgaria in 2009.

== Past finals ==
=== Singles ===
Year	Champion	Runner-up	Score
2010	Not Held		
2009	(Czech Republic) Ivo Minář	(Germany) Florian Mayer	6–4, 6–3

=== Doubles ===
Year	Champions	Runners-up	Score
2010	Not Held		
2009	(Slovakia) Dominik Hrbatý (Czech Republic) David Škoch	(United Kingdom) James Auckland (Australia) Peter Luczak	6–2, 6–4
