= Palm Hills International Tennis Challenger =

Palm Hills

Defunct tennis tournament
- Event name: Palm Hills International Tennis Challenger
- Location: Cairo, Egypt
- Category: ATP Challenger Tour
- Surface: Clay
- Draw: 32S/32Q/16D
- Prize money: €35,000+H

The Palm Hills International Tennis Challenger was a professional tennis tournament played on outdoor red clay courts. It was part of the Association of Tennis Professionals (ATP) Challenger Tour. It was held annually in Cairo, Egypt from 1983 until 2002, and in 2010.

== Results ==
=== Singles ===
Year	Champions	Runners-up	Score
1983	(Sweden) Henrik Sundström	(Spain) Juan Avendaño	6–7, 6–2, 6–0
1984	(Spain) Fernando Luna	(United States) Mark Dickson	6–4, 6–2
1985	(Spain) Fernando Luna	(Australia) Trevor Allan	6–3, 6–4
1986	Not Completed		
1987	(Spain) Alberto Tous	(Spain) David de Miguel	6–2, 6–3
1988	(Spain) Jordi Arrese	(Peru) Carlos di Laura	7–6, 6–2
1989	(Spain) Sergi Bruguera	(Spain) Jordi Arrese	6–7, 6–4, 6–4
1990	(Austria) Thomas Muster	(Spain) José Francisco Altur	6–4, 6–3
1991	(United States) Bryan Shelton	(Netherlands) Jacco Eltingh	7–6, 7–6
1992 - 1995	Not Held		
1996	(Brazil) Fernando Meligeni	(Spain) Alberto Berasategui	3–6, 6–1, 6–2
1997	(Spain) Alberto Berasategui	(Morocco) Karim Alami	7–5, 6–3
1998	(Spain) Albert Portas	(Spain) Alberto Martín	6–2, 1–6, 6–3
1999	(Morocco) Karim Alami	(Belgium) Christophe Rochus	6–3, 6–1
2000	(Spain) Albert Portas	(Czech Republic) Jiří Vaněk	7–5, 6–3
2001	Not Held		
2002	(Italy) Stefano Galvani	(Spain) Albert Portas	2–6, 7–6, 6–1
2003 - 2009	Not Held		
2010	(Czech Republic) Ivo Minář	(Italy) Simone Vagnozzi	3–6, 6–2, 6–3

=== Doubles ===
Year	Champions	Runners-up	Score
1983	(Australia) Broderick Dyke (Australia) Rod Frawley	(Australia) Brad Drewett (United Kingdom) John Feaver	6–3, 6–2
1984	(United States) Brett Dickinson (United States) Drew Gitlin	(United States) Marcel Freeman (United States) Tim Wilkison	7–6, 6–3
1985	(India) Anand Amritraj (United States) Lloyd Bourne	(Australia) Trevor Allan (Spain) Alberto Tous	6–4, 2–6, 7–5
1986	Not Held		
1987	(France) Loïc Courteau (West Germany) Tore Meinecke	(Spain) Jordi Arrese (Spain) David de Miguel	2–6, 7–6, 6–4
1988	(Czechoslovakia) Josef Čihák (Czechoslovakia) Cyril Suk	(Argentina) Roberto Argüello (Argentina) Marcelo Ingaramo	6–3, 6–2
1989	(Spain) Jordi Arrese (Spain) Tomás Carbonell	(Spain) Carlos Costa (Spain) Francisco Roig	7–6, 6–3
1990	(Czechoslovakia) Tomáš Anzari (Czechoslovakia) David Rikl	(Belgium) Eduardo Masso (Argentina) Christian Miniussi	6–3, 6–7, 7–5
1991	(Czechoslovakia) Martin Damm (Czechoslovakia) David Rikl	(Zimbabwe) Byron Black (South Africa) Marcos Ondruska	6–2, 6–3
1992 - 1995	Not Held		
1996	(Spain) Alberto Berasategui (Spain) Germán Puentes	(Slovakia) Branislav Gálik (Slovenia) Borut Urh	6–0, 6–0
1997	(Spain) Tomás Carbonell (Spain) Francisco Roig	(Australia) Wayne Arthurs (Israel) Eyal Ran	6–3, 6–3
1998	(Spain) Albert Portas (Spain) Álex López Morón	(Spain) Salvador Navarro (Spain) Alberto Martín	4–6, 6–3, 6–2
1999	(Spain) Juan Ignacio Carrasco (Spain) Jairo Velasco Jr.	(Spain) Albert Portas (Spain) Álex López Morón	6–7(6), 6–4, 7–6(5)
2000	(Spain) Albert Portas (Spain) Álex López Morón	(Czech Republic) Pavel Kudrnáč (Czech Republic) Petr Kovačka	6–4, 6–3
2001	Not Held		
2002	(Germany) Karsten Braasch (Germany) Tomas Behrend	(Spain) Albert Portas (Spain) Álex López Morón	7–6(3), 6–4
2003 - 2009	Not Held		
2010	(Austria) Martin Slanar (Italy) Simone Vagnozzi	(Germany) Andre Begemann (Jamaica) Dustin Brown	6–3, 6–4
