= Dmitri Sitak =

Russian tennis player

- Country (sports): Russia
- Residence: Moscow, Russia
- Born: 4 March 1983 (age 42) Orenburg, Soviet Union
- Height: 1.83 m (6 ft 0 in)
- Turned pro: 2000
- Plays: Right-handed (two-handed backhand)
- Prize money: US$107,869

Singles
- Career record: 0–0
- Career titles: 0
- Highest ranking: No. 356 (12 November 2003)

Doubles
- Career record: 0–6
- Career titles: 0
- Highest ranking: No. 138 (22 March 2010)
Medal record
Men's tennis
Representing Russia
Summer Universiade
Gold medal – first place	2005 Izmir	Doubles

Dmitri Yurievich Sitak (born 4 March 1983) is a Russian tennis player playing on the ATP Challenger Tour. On 17 November 2003, he reached his highest ATP singles ranking of World No. 356 whilst his highest doubles ranking of No. 138 was reached on 22 March 2010. He is the older brother of Artem Sitak, who is also a tennis player. Sitak was the first player that future world number one player Daniil Medvedev beat as a professional, when in March 2011 Medvedev won their match at an ITF Futures event in Russia.

== Challenger finals ==
Legend
ATP Challenger Tour (2–1)

=== Doubles: 3 (2–1) ===
Result	No.	Date	Tournament	Surface	Partner	Opponents	Score
Win	1.	10 May 2009	Sanremo, Italy	Clay	(Kazakhstan) Yuri Schukin	(Italy) Daniele Bracciali (Italy) Giancarlo Petrazzuolo	6–4, 7–6^{(7–4)}
Win	2.	8 November 2009	Chuncheon, South Korea	Hard	(Latvia) Andis Juška	(Chinese Taipei) Lee Hsin-han (Chinese Taipei) Yang Tsung-hua	3–6, 6–3, [10–2]
Loss	3.	14 March 2010	Rabat, Morocco	Clay	(Ukraine) Oleksandr Dolgopolov Jr.	(Serbia) Ilija Bozoljac (Italy) Daniele Bracciali	4–6, 4–6
