= Evgeny Korolev =

Russian tennis player

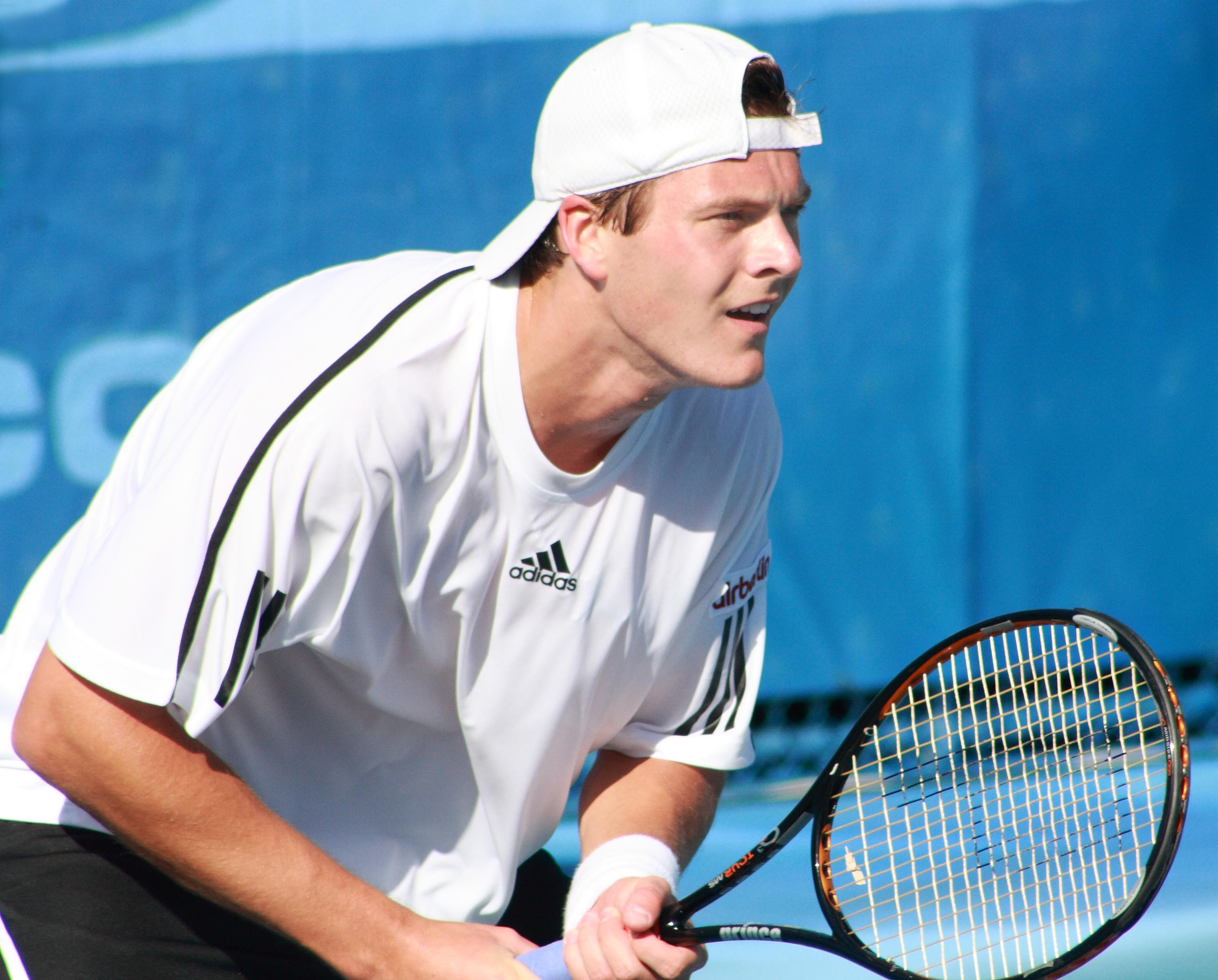
- Korolev in 2009
- Native name: Евгений Королёв
- Country (sports): Kazakhstan (2010–); Russia (2005–2010)
- Residence: Magnolia, Texas, U.S.
- Born: 14 February 1988 (age 38) Moscow, Russian SFSR, Soviet Union
- Height: 1.85 m (6 ft 1 in)
- Turned pro: 2005
- Retired: 2017
- Plays: Right-handed (two-handed backhand)
- Prize money: $1,510,466
- Official website: http://evgenykorolev.net/

Singles
- Career record: 74–98
- Career titles: 0
- Highest ranking: No. 46 (22 February 2010)

Grand Slam singles results
- Australian Open: 3R (2010)
- French Open: 2R (2007)
- Wimbledon: 2R (2010)
- US Open: 2R (2008)

Doubles
- Career record: 10–30
- Career titles: 0
- Highest ranking: No. 113 (22 March 2010)

Grand Slam doubles results
- Australian Open: 2R (2010)
- French Open: 1R (2009, 2010)
- Wimbledon: 2R (2009)

Team competitions
- Davis Cup: QF (2011, 2013)
- Last updated on: 27 June 2022.

Evgeny Evgenyevich Korolev (Russian: Евгений Евгеньевич Королёв; born 14 February 1988) is a retired Russian-born Kazakhstani professional tennis player and the cousin of former Russian player Anna Kournikova. He began playing tennis at age four with his father, and picked up his first ATP points at age 15 in three German challenger events. He can speak Russian, German, English and Spanish.

== Career ==
=== Early years ===
In 2005, he won three futures and a challenger event. He started off the year with a defeat in a German futures event, although only after beating fellow hopeful Andrey Golubev on the way. He later claimed a second futures win in France, in which he beat home favorite Mathieu Montcourt in the final. He later won another futures event in Austria and an F1 event in France. His success in these contests convinced him to start playing more challenger events, including a victory in the Aachen challenger event, in which he beat Igor Kunitsyn and Dominik Meffert on his way to the title.

In 2006 Korolev claimed a win in Marseille over fellow countryman and world number 5 Nikolay Davydenko, but went on to lose in the quarter-finals to French veteran Sébastien Grosjean. Shortly after, Korolev beat former World Number 1 and Grand Slam winner Carlos Moyá, before eliminating Andreas Seppi on his Grand Slam debut at Roland Garros, before going out to Gastón Gaudio. He then won another challenger contest, but lost to Sluiter in the final of the Aachen event.

=== 2007–2008 ===
Korolev then went on to the Australian Open 2007, in which he lost to the eventual runner-up Fernando González. He also lost to both Radek Štěpánek and James Blake prior to the event. He then reached the semi-finals of an American contest, losing to Jürgen Melzer, after beating James Blake and Sam Querrey in the earlier rounds. Korolev then played his first masters series event in Indian Wells, in which he was eliminated by Novak Djokovic in straight sets. He later described this as a learning curve, after wins over Simon Greul and close friend Dmitry Tursunov.

He later lost in the US Open to Stanislas Wawrinka. Korolev then once again claimed the Aachen challenger title by defeating Andreas Beck in the final to win the tournament for the third time. He then played in Saint Petersburg, but went out in straight sets against the British number 1, Andrew Murray.

In 2008, Korolev also claimed victories over the likes of Paul-Henri Mathieu and Fernando González, and reached the quarter-finals in Sydney, losing to Frenchman Fabrice Santoro.

During the second round of a tournament in Las Vegas, Korolev was leading 6–3, 5–2 against number one seed Fernando González. He served for the match twice and was broken each time. He eventually prevailed in a second set tiebreak but needed 11 match points to win. He said that if he had lost that second set, he would have lost the match. In his first semifinal of the year, he lost to Nicolás Almagro in Valencia.

Korolev faced Robin Söderling in the first round in Rome. After losing in the first round at both Munich and Roland Garros, Korolev reached his third quarter-final of the year, in which he lost to the Russian number one, Nikolay Davydenko. At the US Open, Korolev beat Swedish Robin Söderling before losing to Gaël Monfils in the second round. After undergoing another hernia surgery, Korolev made a comeback on the Challenger Circuit in the fall. His biggest successes were a title win in Aachen and a semifinal showing in Düsseldorf.

=== 2009 ===
At the 2009 Australian Open, Korolev made his way through the qualifying rounds and beat former world number 1 Carlos Moyá, in the first round. He lost to Roger Federer in the second round 2–6, 3–6, 1–6.

At the end of February, Korolev reached his first ATP World Tour final at the Delray Beach tournament in the United States. Again starting in qualifying, he won seven straight matches (including wins over world number 38, Igor Kunitsyn, and over Guillermo García-López) before eventually falling in the final to top seed, Mardy Fish, 7–5, 6–3. This placed him back into the ATP Tour's top 100 players, at number 79.

After early losses in Masters 1000 events in Indian Wells and Miami, including a loss in the Sunrise, Florida Challenger, Korolev moved on to Houston, his first clay tournament of the year. There, he reached the semifinal, scoring wins against players such as Leonardo Mayer, Daniel Gimeno Traver, and Guillermo Cañas, before losing to the eventual champion Lleyton Hewitt 6–7, 4–6. That result brought him to the No. 72 in the world rankings.

Korolev struggled to build on that run, with Masters 1000 defeats to Juan Mónaco and Eduardo Schwank when aiming to qualify and was also put out of Munich in straight sets to Frenchman Jérémy Chardy. However, Korolev did manage to claim a victory in Düsseldorf over Andreas Seppi, later losing to both Troicki of Serbia and Máximo González of Argentina. At Roland Garros, Korolev had to pull out of a match with Gimeno Traver due to an ankle problem which had also forced him out of the doubles the week prior to the event.

His next scheduled event was at Queens Club where he was defeated by Frenchman Michaël Llodra. In Eastbourne, he bowed out to Garcia Lopez despite his previous winning record against the Spaniard. Korolev then faced good friend and fellow country man Igor Andreev at Wimbledon and lost in four sets. He has since taken part in occasional challenger events, although he admits his motivation has been hindered by the move to the lower ranks of world tennis, possibly contributing to losses against Pere Riba and Roberto Bautista-Agut.

In September 2009, Evgeny Korolev won the 17th Szczecin Pekao Open, defeating Albert Montañés 4–6, 6–3, 6–2 in the semi-final, and Frenchman Florent Serra 6–4, 6–3 in the final. He reached three straight ATP level quarterfinals. In the first, the 2009 Open de Moselle he lost to Philipp Kohlschreiber 6–1, 6–3. In the 2009 PTT Thailand Open he lost to eventual champion Gilles Simon after defeating Fabrice Santoro and Robby Ginepri. Finally, in the 2009 Kremlin Cup he lost to Illya Marchenko 0–6, 6–2, 6–3 after defeating compatriots Igor Kunitsyn and Marat Safin.

As the sixth seed he lost in the first round of the 2009 St. Petersburg Open to qualifier and eventual champion Sergiy Stakhovsky. He played his last tournament of the year in the 2009 Davidoff Swiss Indoors as a qualifier, defeating Simone Bolelli 3–6, 7–6, 6–2 and Jérémy Chardy 6–4, 7–6, before losing to top seed Roger Federer 6–3, 6–2.

=== 2010–2011 ===
Korolev began the year at the 2010 Qatar ExxonMobil Open and the 2010 Medibank International Sydney, in both cases reaching the second round, losing to Roger Federer and Mardy Fish respectively. In the 2010 Australian Open he reached the third round losing to eleventh seed Fernando González in five sets 7–6, 3–6, 6–1, 3–6, 4–6 after defeating 21st seed Tomáš Berdych in straight sets. He then suffered early defeats in the first round of the 2010 PBZ Zagreb Indoors to Ivan Dodig, in the second round of the 2010 Regions Morgan Keegan Championships to Philipp Petzschner, and in the second round of the 2010 Delray Beach International Tennis Championships to Jarkko Nieminen. In the 2010 BNP Paribas Open, he lost to Robin Söderling 6–2, 6–4 in the second round, after defeating Florian Mayer 6–3, 6–2. In the first round of the 2010 Sony Ericsson Open he lost to Dudi Sela 6–3, 6–3. He then fell in the first rounds of 2010 U.S. Men's Clay Court Championships, 2010 Monte-Carlo Rolex Masters, and 2010 Barcelona Open Banco Sabadell, He then broke the losing streak at the 2010 Serbia Open defeating Michael Russell 6–1, 6–0, but fell in the next round to Sam Querrey. He then fell in his next four matches at the 2010 Mutua Madrileña Madrid Open, 2010 French Open, 2010 Aegon Championships and 2010 Aegon International. He then won against Eduardo Schwank 6–1, 7–6, 4–6, 6–2 but retired in the second round of 2010 Wimbledon against Lleyton Hewitt down 2 sets to love and 0–3. He then fell in the qualifying draw of 2010 MercedesCup and first round of 2010 International German Open. He then made his best performance of the year by reaching the quarterfinals of the 2010 Pilot Pen Tennis without dropping a set but lost to Thiemo de Bakker in straight sets. At the US Open he retired against Kei Nishikori in the first round due to an elbow injury which sidelined him for the rest of the year and caused him to fall outside the top 100.

In 2011, due to his low ranking he started playing in the qualifying rounds and the challenger tour, but fell short, not being able to score back-to-back wins, until the 2011 Status Athens Open, where he reached the quarterfinals before falling to Dmitry Tursunov 7–5, 7–5.

== ATP career finals ==
=== Singles: 1 (1 runner-up) ===
Legend Grand Slam Tournaments (0–0) ATP World Tour Finals (0–0) ATP Masters 1000 Series (0–0) ATP 500 Series (0–0) ATP 250 Series (0–1)	Finals by surface Hard (0–1) Clay (0–0) Grass (0–0) Carpet (0–0)	Finals by setting Outdoors (0–1) Indoors (0–0)

Result	W–L	Date	Tournament	Tier	Surface	Opponent	Score
Loss	0–1	Mar 2009	Delray Beach, United States	250 Series	Hard	(United States) Mardy Fish	5–7, 3–6

== ATP Challenger and ITF Futures finals ==
=== Singles: 17 (11–6) ===
Legend ATP Challenger (5–2) ITF Futures (6–4)	Finals by surface Hard (1–2) Clay (7–2) Grass (0–0) Carpet (3–2)

Result	W–L	Date	Tournament	Tier	Surface	Opponent	Score
Loss	0–1	Sep 2004	Germany F15, Kempten	Futures	Clay	(Poland) Adam Chadaj	2–6, 2–6
Win	1–1	Sep 2004	Germany F16, Friedberg	Futures	Clay	(Germany) Marius Zay	6–2, 6–2
Loss	1–2	Jan 2005	Germany F4, Kaarst	Futures	Carpet	(Germany) Lars Uebel	4–6, 6–7^{(5–7)}
Win	2–2	Apr 2005	France F7, Angers	Futures	Clay	(France) Mathieu Montcourt	5–7, 6–3, 7–6^{(7–3)}
Win	3–2	Jul 2005	Austria F6, Kramsach	Futures	Clay	(Austria) Armin Sandbichler	7–6^{(7–1)}, 6–0
Win	4–2	Sep 2005	France F13, Mulhouse	Futures	Hard	(Germany) Philipp Hammer	6–4, 6–3
Win	5–2	Nov 2005	Aachen, Germany	Challenger	Carpet	(Netherlands) Raemon Sluiter	6–3, 7–6^{(9–7)}
Win	6–2	Sep 2006	Düsseldorf, Germany	Challenger	Clay	(Sweden) Andreas Vinciguerra	7–6^{(7–4)}, 6–3
Loss	6–3	Nov 2006	Aachen, Germany	Challenger	Carpet	(Germany) Rainer Schüttler	3–6, 5–7
Win	7–3	Nov 2007	Aachen, Germany	Challenger	Carpet	(Germany) Andreas Beck	6–4, 6–4
Win	8–3	Nov 2008	Aachen, Germany	Challenger	Carpet	(Belgium) Ruben Bemelmans	7–6^{(7–5)}, 7–6^{(7–3)}
Win	9–3	Sep 2009	Szczecin, Poland	Challenger	Clay	(France) Florent Serra	6–4, 6–3
Loss	9–4	Jun 2011	Milan, Italy	Challenger	Clay	(Spain) Albert Ramos-Vinolas	4–6, 0–3 ret.
Win	10–4	Jul 2012	Germany F7, Roemerberg	Futures	Clay	(Germany) Bastian Knittel	6–2, 6–2
Loss	10–5	Oct 2012	Turkey F41, Antalya	Futures	Hard	(Netherlands) Jesse Huta Galung	3–6, 3–6
Loss	10–6	Mar 2014	Kazakhstan F1, Aktobe	Futures	Hard	(Russia) Alexey Vatutin	7–6^{(7–4)}, 4–6, 3–6
Win	11–6	Aug 2014	Germany F10, Wetzlar	Futures	Clay	(Germany) Julian Lenz	6–0, 0–6, 6–3

=== Doubles: 12 (7–5) ===
Legend ATP Challenger (3–4) ITF Futures (4–1)	Finals by surface Hard (2–2) Clay (5–3) Grass (0–0) Carpet (0–0)

Result	W–L	Date	Tournament	Tier	Surface	Partner	Opponents	Score
Win	1–0	Sep 2004	Germany F14, Nuremberg	Futures	Clay	(Italy) Alessandro Motti	(Germany) Tom Dennhardt (Germany) Rober tJammer-Luhr	7–6^{(7–5)}, 6–1
Win	2–0	Apr 2005	France F6, Grasse	Futures	Clay	(United States) Lesley Joseph	(France) Mathieu Montcourt (France) Jean-Baptiste Robin	6–1, 6–7^{(3–7)}, 6–2
Win	3–0	Jul 2005	Germany F8, Düsseldorf	Futures	Clay	(Belgium) Dominique Coene	(Germany) Tobias Clemens (Germany) Ralph Grambow	3–6, 6–2, 6–0
Loss	3–1	Jul 2005	Recanati, Italy	Challenger	Hard	(Uzbekistan) Farrukh Dustov	(Italy) Uros Vico (Croatia) Lovro Zovko	6–7^{(2–7)}, 3–4 ret.
Win	4–1	Apr 2006	France F7, Angers	Futures	Clay	(Belgium) Dominique Coene	(Australia) Rameez Junaid (Australia) Joseph Sirianni	6–2, 6–4
Loss	4–2	Sep 2006	Düsseldorf, Germany	Challenger	Clay	(Germany) Simon Greul	(United States) Hugo Armando (Germany) Tomas Behrend	1–6, 6–4, [4–10]
Win	5–2	Oct 2006	Grenoble, France	Challenger	Hard	(Russia) Teimuraz Gabashvili	(France) Thomas Oger (France) Nicolas Tourte	7–5, 6–4
Win	6–2	Oct 2009	Mons, Belgium	Challenger	Hard	(Uzbekistan) Denis Istomin	(Colombia) Alejandro Falla (Russia) Teimuraz Gabashvili	6–7^{(4–7)}, 7–6^{(7–4)}, [11–9]
Loss	6–3	Mar 2011	Rabat, Morocco	Challenger	Clay	(Kazakhstan) Yuri Schukin	(Italy) Alessio Di Mauro (Italy) Simone Vagnozzi	4–6, 4–6
Win	7–3	Jun 2013	Marburg, Germany	Challenger	Clay	(Kazakhstan) Andrey Golubev	(Netherlands) Jesse Huta Galung (Australia) Jordan Kerr	6–3, 1–6, [10–6]
Loss	7–4	Feb 2014	Astana, Kazakhstan	Challenger	Hard	(Kazakhstan) Andrey Golubev	(Belarus) Sergey Betov (Belarus) Aliaksandr Bury	1–6, 4–6
Loss	7–5	Sep 2014	Croatia F16, Bol	Futures	Clay	(Netherlands) Sander Groen	(Hungary) Gabor Borsos (Italy) Antonio Mastrelia	5–7, 6–3, [6–10]

== Performance timeline ==
Key
W	F	SF	QF	#R	RR	Q#	DNQ	A	NH

(W) winner; (F) finalist; (SF) semifinalist; (QF) quarterfinalist; (#R) rounds 4, 3, 2, 1; (RR) round-robin stage; (Q#) qualification round; (DNQ) did not qualify; (A) absent; (NH) not held; (SR) strike rate (events won / competed); (W–L) win–loss record.

=== Singles ===
Tournament	2006	2007	2008	2009	2010	2011	2012	2013	SR	W–L	Win %
Grand Slam tournaments
Australian Open	A	1R	2R	2R	3R	Q2	A	Q1	0 / 4	4–4	50%
French Open	2R	A	1R	1R	1R	Q1	A	A	0 / 4	1–4	20%
Wimbledon	A	1R	1R	1R	2R	A	A	Q1	0 / 4	1–4	20%
US Open	Q3	1R	2R	1R	1R	A	A	Q1	0 / 4	1–4	20%
Win–loss	1–1	0–3	2–4	1–4	3–4	0–0	0–0	0–0	0 / 16	7–16	30%
ATP Tour Masters 1000
Indian Wells	A	3R	1R	Q1	2R	A	A	A	0 / 3	3–3	50%
Miami	Q1	2R	1R	Q2	1R	A	A	A	0 / 3	1–3	25%
Monte Carlo	1R	A	A	A	1R	A	A	A	0 / 2	0–2	0%
Hamburg	A	A	Q2	Not Masters Series					0 / 0	0–0	–
Rome	Q1	A	2R	Q2	1R	A	A	A	0 / 2	1–2	33%
Madrid	A	A	A	Q2	1R	A	A	A	0 / 1	0–1	0%
Cincinnati	Q1	Q1	A	A	A	A	A	A	0 / 0	0–0	–
Win–loss	0–1	3–2	1–3	0–0	1–5	0–0	0–0	0–0	0 / 11	5–11	31%
