= Ivo Minář =

Czech tennis player (born 1984)

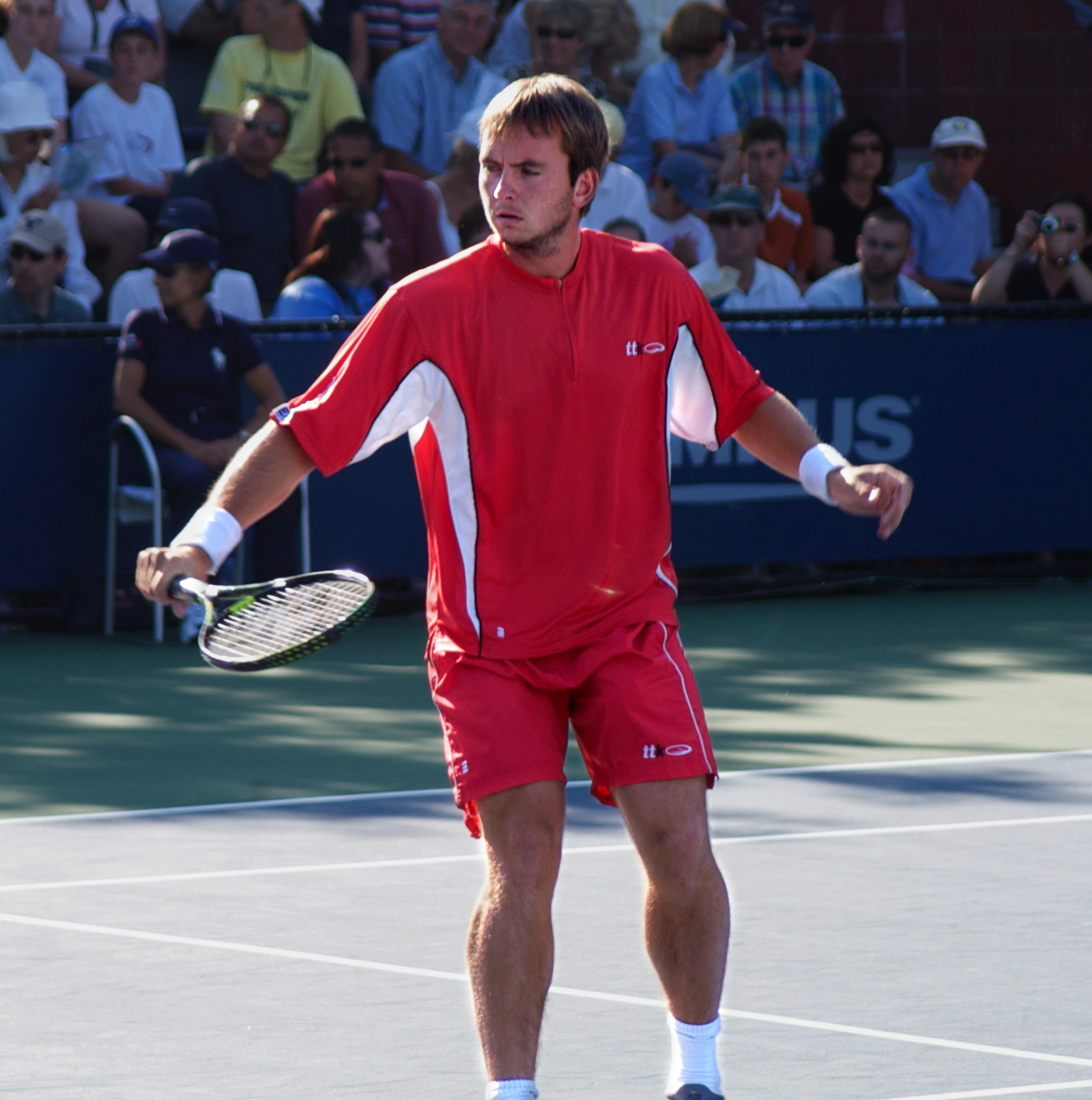
- Country (sports): Czech Republic
- Residence: Prague, Czech Republic
- Born: 21 May 1984 (age 40); Prague, Czechoslovakia (now Czech Republic)
- Height: 1.82 m (5 ft 11 1/2 in)
- Turned pro: 2002
- Retired: 2015
- Plays: Right-handed (two-handed backhand)
- Prize money: $1,015,448

Singles
- Career record: 35–69
- Career titles: 0
- Highest ranking: No. 62 (20 July 2009)

Grand Slam singles results
- Australian Open: 1R (2006, 2008, 2009)
- French Open: 2R (2009)
- Wimbledon: 2R (2005, 2009)
- US Open: 2R (2008)

Doubles
- Career record: 11–15
- Career titles: 1
- Highest ranking: No. 120 (8 May 2006)

Team competitions
- Davis Cup: W (2012)

Ivo Minář (born 21 May 1984) is a former professional male tennis player from the Czech Republic. On 20 July 2009 Minář reached his career-high singles ranking of World No. 62. His brother Jan is also a professional player, who has been ranked in the top 200 in the world.

Minář was a member of the winning Czech Republic team in the 2012 Davis Cup.

Minář also worked as coach of Czech tennis player Kristýna Plíšková.

== Career ==
Minář won the European junior championships in Klosters when he was 16, defeating fellow Czech Tomáš Berdych.

=== Professional career ===
In his career, he has not won an ATP singles title, but has reached one singles final – in 2005 in Sydney, where he lost to Lleyton Hewitt of Australia. On his way to that final, he dispatched three future top 10 stars in Nikolay Davydenko, Fernando Verdasco and Radek Štěpánek. Later that year, he qualified for the tournament in Dubai and pushed World No. 1 Roger Federer to final set tie-break in the first round, losing 7–6^{(5)}, 3–6, 6–7^{(5)}.

Minář tested positive for methylhexanamine on 11 July 2009 and was suspended eight months.

== ATP Tour finals ==
=== Singles: 1 (0–1) ===
Legend
Grand Slam (0–0)
ATP World Tour Finals (0–0)
ATP World Tour Masters 1000 (0–0)
ATP World Tour 500 series (0–0)
ATP World Tour 250 series (0–1)

Outcome	No.	Date	Tournament	Surface	Opponent	Score
Runner-up	1.	Jan 2005	Sydney, Australia	Hard	(Australia) Lleyton Hewitt	5–7, 0–6

=== Doubles: 1 (1–0) ===
Legend
Grand Slam (0–0)
ATP World Tour Finals (0–0)
ATP World Tour Masters 1000 (0–0)
ATP World Tour 500 series (0–0)
ATP World Tour 250 series (1–0)

Outcome	No.	Date	Tournament	Surface	Partner	Opponents	Score
Winner	1.	May 2009	Munich, Germany	Clay	(Czech Republic) Jan Hernych	(Australia) Ashley Fisher (Australia) Jordan Kerr	6–4, 6–4

== Challenger finals ==
=== Singles: 17 (9–8) ===
Legend
ATP Challenger Tour (9–8)

Outcome	No.	Date	Tournament	Surface	Opponent	Score
Runner-up	1.	23 May 2004	Prague, Czech Republic	Clay	(Czech Republic) Jan Hernych	1–6, 4–6
Runner-up	2.	28 November 2004	Groningen, Netherlands	Hard	(Netherlands) Peter Wessels	3–6, 2–6
Runner-up	3.	5 June 2005	Prostějov, Czech Republic	Clay	(Finland) Jarkko Nieminen	1–6, 3–6
Winner	4.	7 May 2006	Ostrava, Czech Republic	Clay	(Spain) Marcel Granollers	6–1, 6–0
Runner-up	5.	9 July 2006	Biella, Italy	Clay	(Italy) Simone Bolelli	5–7, 6–3, 6–7^{(0–7)}
Winner	6.	2 September 2007	Freudenstadt, Germany	Clay	(France) Éric Prodon	7–5, 6–3
Runner-up	7.	23 September 2007	Szczecin, Poland	Clay	(Argentina) Sergio Roitman	2–6, 5–7
Winner	8.	4 November 2007	Busan, South Korea	Hard	(Serbia) Viktor Troicki	7–6^{(7–2)}, 6–7^{(7–9)}, 6–3
Runner-up	9.	26 October 2008	Seoul, South Korea	Hard	(South Korea) Hyung-Taik Lee	4–6, 0–6
Winner	10.	2 November 2008	Busan, South Korea	Hard	(United States) Alex Bogomolov Jr.	6–1, 2–0, ret.
Winner	11.	29 March 2009	Barletta, Italy	Clay	(Spain) Santiago Ventura	6–4, 6–3
Winner	12.	26 April 2009	Sofia, Bulgaria	Clay	(Germany) Florian Mayer	6–4, 6–3
Winner	13.	8 May 2010	Cairo, Egypt	Clay	(Italy) Simone Vagnozzi	3–6, 6–2, 6–3
Runner-up	14.	27 June 2010	Marburg, Germany	Clay	(Italy) Simone Vagnozzi	6–2, 3–6, 5–7
Runner-up	15.	5 September 2010	Como, Italy	Clay	(Netherlands) Robin Haase	4–6, 3–6
Winner	16.	20 March 2011	Rabat, Morocco	Clay	(Australia) Peter Luczak	7–5, 6–3
Winner	17.	22 April 2012	Santos, Brazil	Clay	(Brazil) Ricardo Hocevar	4–6, 6–1, 6–4

=== Doubles: 1 (0–1) ===
Legend
ATP Challenger Tour (0–1)

Outcome	No.	Date	Tournament	Surface	Partner	Opponents	Score
Runner-up	1.	13 February 2006	Belgrade, Serbia and Montenegro	Carpet (i)	(Czech Republic) Jan Minář	(Germany) Michael Kohlmann (Germany) Alexander Waske	6–7^{(3–7)}, 3–6
