= Morocco Tennis Tour – Rabat =

ATP Challenger Tour
- Event name: Rabat
- Location: Rabat, Morocco
- Category: ATP Challenger Tour
- Surface: Red clay
- Draw: 32S/32Q/16D
- Prize money: €42,500+H
- Website: Website

The Morocco Tennis Tour – Rabat is a professional tennis tournament played on outdoor red clay courts. It is part of the ATP Challenger Tour. It was held annually in Rabat, Morocco, from 2007 to 2012.

== Past finals ==
=== Singles ===
Year	Champion	Runner-up	Score
2012	(Slovakia) Martin Kližan	(Italy) Filippo Volandri	6–2, 6–3
2011	(Czech Republic) Ivo Minář	(Australia) Peter Luczak	7–5, 6–3
2010	(Spain) Rubén Ramírez Hidalgo	(Spain) Marcel Granollers	6–4, 6–4
2009	(France) Laurent Recouderc	(Spain) Santiago Ventura	6–0, 6–2
2008	(Brazil) Thomaz Bellucci	(Argentina) Martín Vassallo Argüello	6–2, 6–2
2007	(Italy) Stefano Galvani	(France) Olivier Patience	6–1, 6–1

=== Doubles ===
Year	Champions	Runners-up	Score
2012	(Spain) Íñigo Cervantes Huegun (Argentina) Federico Delbonis	(Slovakia) Martin Kližan (France) Stéphane Robert	6–7^{(3–7)}, 6–1, [10–5]
2011	(Italy) Alessio di Mauro (Italy) Simone Vagnozzi	(Kazakhstan) Evgeny Korolev (Kazakhstan) Yuri Schukin	6–4, 6–4
2010	(Serbia) Ilija Bozoljac (Italy) Daniele Bracciali	(Ukraine) Oleksandr Dolgopolov Jr. (Russia) Dmitri Sitak	6–4, 6–4
2009	(Spain) Rubén Ramírez Hidalgo (Spain) Santiago Ventura	(Germany) Michael Kohlmann (Germany) Philipp Marx	6–4, 7–6^{(7–5)}
2008	(Spain) Guillermo García López (Argentina) Mariano Hood	(Spain) Marc Fornell Mestres (Brazil) Caio Zampieri	6–3, 6–2
2007	(Russia) Yuri Schukin (Ukraine) Orest Tereshchuk	(Australia) Peter Luczak (Serbia) Boris Pašanski	6–7^{(8–10)}, 7–6^{(7–4)}, [10–3]
