= 2007 Thailand Open – Doubles =

Doubles
- 2007 Thailand Open

Final
- Champions: (Thailand) Sanchai Ratiwatana (Thailand) Sonchat Ratiwatana
- Runners-up: (France) Michaël Llodra (France) Nicolas Mahut
- Score: 3–6, 7–5, [10–7]

Events
Singles	Doubles
← 2006 ·	Thailand Open	· 2008 →

Jonathan Erlich and Andy Ram were the defending champions, but lost in the quarterfinals to Vince Spadea and Fernando Verdasco.

Sanchai Ratiwatana and Sonchat Ratiwatana won in the final 3–6, 7–5, [10–7], against Michaël Llodra and Nicolas Mahut.

== Seeds ==
1. (Israel) Jonathan Erlich / (Israel) Andy Ram (quarterfinals)
2. (South Africa) Jeff Coetzee / (Netherlands) Rogier Wassen (quarterfinals)
3. (France) Michaël Llodra / (France) Nicolas Mahut (final)
4. (United States) Eric Butorac / (Australia) Todd Perry (first round)

== Draw ==
=== Key ===
- Q = Qualifier
- WC = Wild card
- LL = Lucky loser
- Alt = Alternate
- SE = Special exempt
- PR = Protected ranking
- ITF = ITF entry
- JE = Junior exempt
- w/o = Walkover
- r = Retired
- d = Defaulted
- SR = Special ranking

=== Draw ===
First round
1	(Israel) J Erlich (Israel) A Ram	7^{7}	6
(Canada) F Dancevic (Argentina) J M del Potro	6^{5}	4
(United States) S Lipsky (United States) D Martin	4	6	[4]
(United States) V Spadea (Spain) F Verdasco	6	3	[10]
3	(France) M Llodra (France) N Mahut	6^{5}	6	[10]
(South Africa) C Haggard (Croatia) I Karlović	7^{7}	4	[7]
(Australia) S Huss (United States) S Querrey	6	4	[8]
(Germany) B Becker (Russia) I Kunitsyn	2	6	[10]
(United States) A Delić (Australia) J Kerr	5	6	[4]
(Czech Republic) P Pála (Czech Republic) D Škoch	7	1	[10]
WC	(Thailand) S Ratiwatana (Thailand) S Ratiwatana	7	7
4	(United States) E Butorac (Australia) T Perry	5	5
WC	(Israel) H Levy (Thailand) D Udomchoke	4	1
(Australia) A Fisher (United States) J Thomas	6	6
(Austria) W Eschauer (United States) M Russell	3	2
2	(South Africa) J Coetzee (Netherlands) R Wassen	6	6

Quarterfinals
1	(Israel) J Erlich (Israel) A Ram	7	3	[8]
(United States) V Spadea (Spain) F Verdasco	5	6	[10]
3	(France) M Llodra (France) N Mahut	6	6
(Germany) B Becker (Russia) I Kunitsyn	1	3
(Czech Republic) P Pála (Czech Republic) D Škoch	3	6^{3}
WC	(Thailand) S Ratiwatana (Thailand) S Ratiwatana	6	7^{7}
(Australia) A Fisher (United States) J Thomas	6	2	[10]
2	(South Africa) J Coetzee (Netherlands) R Wassen	3	6	[5]

Semifinals
(United States) V Spadea (Spain) F Verdasco	3	4
3	(France) M Llodra (France) N Mahut	6	6
WC	(Thailand) S Ratiwatana (Thailand) S Ratiwatana	6	6
(Australia) A Fisher (United States) J Thomas	1	1

Final
3	(France) M Llodra (France) N Mahut	6	5	[7]
WC	(Thailand) S Ratiwatana (Thailand) S Ratiwatana	3	7	[10]
