= 2005 Thailand Open – Doubles =

Doubles
- 2005 Thailand Open

Final
- Champion: (Australia) Paul Hanley (India) Leander Paes
- Runner-up: (Israel) Jonathan Erlich (Israel) Andy Ram
- Score: 5–6^{(5–7)}, 6–1, 6–2

Events
Singles	Doubles
← 2004 ·	Thailand Open	· 2006 →

The 2005 Thailand Open was a tennis tournament played on indoor hard courts. It was the 3rd edition of the Thailand Open, and was part of the International Series of the 2005 ATP Tour. It took place at the Impact Arena in Bangkok, Thailand, from September 26 through October 2, 2005. Paul Hanley and Leander Paes won in the final 5–6^{(5–7)}, 6–1, 6–2, against Jonathan Erlich and Andy Ram

== Seeds ==
1. (Australia) Paul Hanley / (India) Leander Paes (champions)
2. (Israel) Jonathan Erlich / (Israel) Andy Ram (finals)
3. (Sweden) Gastón Etlis / (Australia) Martin Rodríguez (semifinals)
4. (Argentina) Jordan Kerr / (Argentina) Jim Thomas (first round)

== Draw ==
=== Key ===
- Q = Qualifier
- WC = Wild card
- LL = Lucky loser
- Alt = Alternate
- SE = Special exempt
- PR = Protected ranking
- ITF = ITF entry
- JE = Junior exempt
- w/o = Walkover
- r = Retired
- d = Defaulted
- SR = Special ranking

=== Finals ===
Round 1
1	(Australia) P Hanley (India) L Paes	6	6
(Switzerland) Y Allegro (United States) G Oliver	4	2
(Thailand) P Srichaphan (Thailand) D Udomchoke	4	6	6
WC	(Thailand) Sa Ratiwatana (Thailand) So Ratiwatana	6	3	4
4	(Argentina) G Etlis (Argentina) M Rodríguez	6	3	4
(South Africa) J Coetzee (South Africa) C Haggard	1	6	6
(United States) R Ginepri (Luxembourg) G Müller	5^{1}	5^{1}
(India) M Bhupathi (United States) J Gimelstob	6^{7}	6^{7}
(Sweden) J Landsberg (Sweden) R Söderling	6	6
(United States) K Kim (Taiwan) J Wang	3	2
(Finland) J Nieminen (Netherlands) R Wassen	3	2
3	(Sweden) S Aspelin (Australia) T Perry	6	6
(Czech Republic) I Minář (Czech Republic) R Vik	2	3
ALT	(Switzerland) G Bastl (Czech Republic) L Dlouhý	6	6
(Spain) G García López (Peru) L Horna	6	5^{8}	4
2	(Israel) J Erlich (Israel) A Ram	3	6^{10}	6

Quarterfinals
1	(Australia) P Hanley (India) L Paes	6	6
(Thailand) P Srichaphan (Thailand) D Udomchoke	4	4
(South Africa) J Coetzee (South Africa) C Haggard	1	4
(India) M Bhupathi (United States) J Gimelstob	6	6
(Sweden) J Landsberg (Sweden) R Söderling	5^{3}	5^{3}
3	(Sweden) S Aspelin (Australia) T Perry	6^{7}	6^{7}
(Switzerland) G Bastl (Czech Republic) L Dlouhý	4	1
2	(Israel) J Erlich (Israel) A Ram	6	6

Semifinals
1	(Australia) P Hanley (India) L Paes	6	6^{7}
(India) M Bhupathi (United States) J Gimelstob	4	5^{5}
3	(Sweden) S Aspelin (Australia) T Perry	5^{5}	2
2	(Israel) J Erlich (Israel) A Ram	6^{7}	6

Finals
1	(Australia) P Hanley (India) L Paes	5^{5}	6	6
2	(Israel) J Erlich (Israel) A Ram	6^{7}	1	2
