= 2010 PTT Thailand Open – Doubles =

Doubles
- 2010 PTT Thailand Open

Final
- Champions: (Germany) Christopher Kas (Serbia) Viktor Troicki
- Runners-up: (Israel) Jonathan Erlich (Austria) Jürgen Melzer
- Score: 6–4, 6–4

Events
Singles	Doubles
← 2009 ·	PTT Thailand Open	· 2011 →

Christopher Kas and Viktor Troicki won the title, defeating Jonathan Erlich and Jürgen Melzer in the final, 6–4, 6–4.

Eric Butorac and Rajeev Ram were the defending champions, but decided not to participate.

== Seeds ==
1. (India) Mahesh Bhupathi / (India) Leander Paes (first round)
2. (Austria) Julian Knowle / (Israel) Andy Ram (first round)
3. (Sweden) Simon Aspelin / (Australia) Paul Hanley (first round)
4. (Israel) Jonathan Erlich / (Austria) Jürgen Melzer (final)

== Draw ==
=== Key ===
- Q = Qualifier
- WC = Wild card
- LL = Lucky loser
- Alt = Alternate
- SE = Special exempt
- PR = Protected ranking
- ITF = ITF entry
- JE = Junior exempt
- w/o = Walkover
- r = Retired
- d = Defaulted
- SR = Special ranking

== Draw ==
First round
1	(India) M Bhupathi (India) L Paes	6^{5}	7^{7}	[4]
(Germany) D Brands (Croatia) I Dodig	7^{7}	6^{5}	[10]
WC	(Russia) D Tursunov (Thailand) K Wachiramanowong	6	7
WC	(Russia) T Gabashvili (Thailand) D Udomchoke	4	5
4	(Israel) J Erlich (Austria) J Melzer	6	6
(United States) B Battistone (Sweden) A Siljeström	3	4
(Kazakhstan) M Kukushkin (France) F Serra	6	3	[9]
(Germany) M Kohlmann (Finland) J Nieminen	4	6	[11]
(Thailand) Sa Ratiwatana (Thailand) So Ratiwatana	4	4
(Germany) C Kas (Serbia) V Troicki	6	6
(United Kingdom) C Fleming (United Kingdom) K Skupski	7^{7}	7^{7}
3	(Sweden) S Aspelin (Australia) P Hanley	6^{5}	6^{3}
(Switzerland) M Chiudinelli (Spain) G García-López	6^{6}	6	[10]
(Spain) M López (Spain) D Marrero	7^{8}	4	[5]
(Germany) B Becker (Germany) M Berrer	5	7^{7}	[11]
2	(Austria) J Knowle (Israel) A Ram	7	6^{4}	[9]

Quarterfinals
(Germany) D Brands (Croatia) I Dodig	3	3
WC	(Russia) D Tursunov (Thailand) K Wachiramanowong	6	6
4	(Israel) J Erlich (Austria) J Melzer	6^{5}	7^{7}	[10]
(Germany) M Kohlmann (Finland) J Nieminen	7^{7}	6^{5}	[5]
(Germany) C Kas (Serbia) V Troicki	7^{7}	6
(United Kingdom) C Fleming (United Kingdom) K Skupski	6^{5}	4
(Switzerland) M Chiudinelli (Spain) G García-López	7^{7}	6
(Germany) B Becker (Germany) M Berrer	6^{5}	4

Semifinals
WC	(Russia) D Tursunov (Thailand) K Wachiramanowong	4	1
4	(Israel) J Erlich (Austria) J Melzer	6	6
(Germany) C Kas (Serbia) V Troicki
(Switzerland) M Chiudinelli (Spain) G García-López	w/o

Finals
4	(Israel) J Erlich (Austria) J Melzer	4	4
(Germany) C Kas (Serbia) V Troicki	6	6
