= 2006 Thailand Open – Singles =

Singles
- 2006 Thailand Open

Final
- Champion: (United States) James Blake
- Runner-up: (Croatia) Ivan Ljubičić
- Score: 6–3, 6–1

Events
Singles	Doubles
← 2005 ·	Thailand Open	· 2007 →

The 2006 Thailand Open was a tennis tournament played on indoor hard courts. It was the 4th edition of the Thailand Open, and was part of the International Series of the 2006 ATP Tour. It took place at the Impact Arena in Bangkok, Thailand, from September 25 through October 1, 2006. James Blake won in the final 6–3, 6–1 against Ivan Ljubičić.

== Seeds ==
1. (Croatia) Ivan Ljubičić (final)
2. (Cyprus) Marcos Baghdatis (withdrew, due to shoulder injury)
3. (United States) James Blake (champion)
4. (United Kingdom) Andy Murray (first round)
5. (Finland) Jarkko Nieminen (Quarterfinal)
6. (Spain) Juan Carlos Ferrero (first round)
7. (United States) Robby Ginepri (Quarterfinal)
8. (Thailand) Paradorn Srichaphan (semifinal)

== Draw ==
=== Key ===
- Q = Qualifier
- WC = Wild card
- LL = Lucky loser
- Alt = Alternate
- SE = Special exempt
- PR = Protected ranking
- ITF = ITF entry
- JE = Junior exempt
- w/o = Walkover
- r = Retired
- d = Defaulted
- SR = Special ranking

=== Finals ===
Semifinals
1	(Croatia) Ivan Ljubičić	6	6
8	(Thailand) Paradorn Srichaphan	3	2
3	(United States) James Blake	3	6	7^{7}
(Russia) Marat Safin	6	4	6^{3}

Final
1	(Croatia) Ivan Ljubičić	3	1
3	(United States) James Blake	6	6

=== Top half ===
First round
1	(Croatia) I Ljubičić	6	3	6
(Spain) F Vicente	3	6	4
(Germany) B Becker	6	6
(Brazil) M Daniel	3	2
(Thailand) D Udomchoke	6	6
Q	(Switzerland) G Bastl	3	0
(Denmark) K Carlsen	3	4
7	(United States) R Ginepri	6	6	4
4	(United Kingdom) A Murray	4	2
(United Kingdom) T Henman	6	6
(United Kingdom) A Bogdanovic	6^{7}	6	6
(Chinese Taipei) Y-t Wang	7^{9}	4	4
WC	(Russia) M Ledovskikh	6	7^{9}
Q	(Sweden) M Ryderstedt	1	6^{7}
WC	(Spain) F López	1	4
8	(Thailand) P Srichaphan	6	6

Second round
1	(Croatia) I Ljubičić	7^{8}	7
(Germany) B Becker	6^{6}	5
(Thailand) D Udomchoke	3	3
(United States) R Ginepri	6	6
(United Kingdom) T Henman	6	5	6
(United Kingdom) A Bogdanovic	3	7	1
WC	(Russia) M Ledovskikh	4	7	2
(Thailand) P Srichaphan	6	5	6

Quarterfinals
1	(Croatia) I Ljubičić	4	6	6
7	(United States) R Ginepri	6	3	4
(United Kingdom) T Henman	7^{7}	4	6^{4}
8	(Thailand) P Srichaphan	6^{2}	6	7^{7}

Semifinals
1	(Croatia) I Ljubičić	6	6
8	(Thailand) P Srichaphan	3	2

=== Bottom half ===
First round
5	(Finland) J Nieminen	6^{6}	6	6
(Argentina) E Massa	7^{8}	3	2
(Canada) F Dancevic	7	3	7^{9}
Q	(Germany) L Burgsmüller	5	6	6^{7}
LL	(Monaco) B Balleret	7	2	6
(Germany) A Waske	5	6	1
WC	(Croatia) M Čilić	1	2
3	(United States) J Blake	6	6
6	(Spain) JC Ferrero	6	2	4
Q	(Germany) M Zverev	4	6	6
(Germany) R Schüttler	6	6
(South Korea) H-t Lee	1	4
(Russia) M Safin	2	6	6
(United States) K Kim	6	1	4
(France) J Benneteau	6	6
LL	(Japan) S Iwabuchi	4	2

Second round
5	(Finland) J Nieminen	2	7^{7}	6
(Canada) F Dancevic	6	6^{3}	4
LL	(Monaco) B Balleret	3	2
3	(United States) J Blake	6	6
Q	(Germany) M Zverev	7^{9}	7
(Germany) R Schüttler	6^{7}	5
(Russia) M Safin	7^{7}	6^{3}	6
(France) J Benneteau	6^{5}	7^{7}	2

Quarterfinals
5	(Finland) J Nieminen	2	6	5
3	(United States) J Blake	6	2	7
Q	(Germany) M Zverev	6^{4}	7	5
(Russia) M Safin	7^{7}	5	7

Semifinals
3	(United States) J Blake	3	6	7^{7}
(Russia) M Safin	6	4	6^{3}
