= 2004 Thailand Open – Doubles =

Doubles
- 2004 Thailand Open

Final
- Champion: (United States) Justin Gimelstob (United States) Graydon Oliver
- Runner-up: (Switzerland) Yves Allegro (Switzerland) Roger Federer
- Score: 5–7, 6–4, 6–4

Events
Singles	Doubles
← 2003 ·	Thailand Open	· 2005 →

Justin Gimelstob and Graydon Oliver won the doubles tennis matches in the final 5–7, 6–4, 6–4, against Yves Allegro and Roger Federer

== Seeds ==
1. (India) Mahesh Bhupathi / (India) Leander Paes (quarterfinals)
2. (Israel) Jonathan Erlich / (Israel) Andy Ram (semifinals)
3. (South Africa) Chris Haggard / (Germany) Michael Kohlmann (first round)
4. (Australia) Jordan Kerr / (United States) Jim Thomas (semifinals)

== Draw ==
=== Key ===
- Q = Qualifier
- WC = Wild card
- LL = Lucky loser
- Alt = Alternate
- SE = Special exempt
- PR = Protected ranking
- ITF = ITF entry
- JE = Junior exempt
- w/o = Walkover
- r = Retired
- d = Defaulted
- SR = Special ranking

=== Draw ===
First round
1	(India) M Bhupathi (India) L Paes	6	6
(Hungary) A Sávolt (Czech Republic) J Vaněk	2	1
(United States) J Gimelstob (United States) G Oliver	7	6
(Russia) M Safin (Sweden) R Söderling	5	3
4	(Australia) J Kerr (United States) J Thomas	4	6	6
WC	(Thailand) Sa Ratiwatana (Thailand) So Ratiwatana	6	3	4
(Netherlands) D van Scheppingen (Netherlands) R Wassen	3	2
WC	(Serbia and Montenegro) N Djokovic (Thailand) D Udomchoke	6	6
(United States) A Bogomolov Jr. (United States) T Dent	4	4
(Sweden) T Johansson (Sweden) R Lindstedt	6	6
(Sweden) S Aspelin (Sweden) J Landsberg	6	6
3	(South Africa) C Haggard (Germany) M Kohlmann	1	3
(Switzerland) M Chiudinelli (Switzerland) I Heuberger	7^{7}	7^{7}
(United States) B Coupe (United States) J Morrison	6^{5}	6^{4}
(Switzerland) Y Allegro (Switzerland) R Federer	7^{10}	7
2	(Israel) J Erlich (Israel) A Ram	6^{8}	5

Quarterfinals
1	(India) M Bhupathi (India) L Paes	7^{7}	4	4
(United States) J Gimelstob (United States) G Oliver	6^{4}	6	6
4	(Australia) J Kerr (United States) J Thomas	7	6
WC	(Serbia and Montenegro) N Djokovic (Thailand) D Udomchoke	5	0
(Sweden) T Johansson (Sweden) R Lindstedt	3	4
(Sweden) S Aspelin (Sweden) J Landsberg	6	6
(Switzerland) M Chiudinelli (Switzerland) I Heuberger
(Switzerland) Y Allegro (Switzerland) R Federer	w/o

Semifinals
(United States) J Gimelstob (United States) G Oliver	6	6^{1}	7^{7}
4	(Australia) J Kerr (United States) J Thomas	4	7^{7}	6^{5}
(Sweden) S Aspelin (Sweden) J Landsberg	3	6^{7}
(Switzerland) Y Allegro (Switzerland) R Federer	6	7^{9}

Final
(United States) J Gimelstob (United States) G Oliver	5	6	6
(Switzerland) Y Allegro (Switzerland) R Federer	7	4	4
