= 2007 Thailand Open – Singles =

Singles
- 2007 Thailand Open

Final
- Champion: (Russia) Dmitry Tursunov
- Runner-up: (Germany) Benjamin Becker
- Score: 6–2, 6–1

Events
Singles	Doubles
← 2006 ·	Thailand Open	· 2008 →

James Blake was the defending champion, but chose not to participate that year.

Dmitry Tursunov won in the final 6–2, 6–1, against Benjamin Becker.

== Seeds ==
1. (Serbia) Novak Djokovic (withdrew due to a back injury)
2. (United States) Andy Roddick (withdrew due to a left foot injury)
3. (Czech Republic) Tomáš Berdych (semifinals)
4. (Germany) Tommy Haas (second round)
5. (Spain) Carlos Moyá (first round)
6. (Russia) Dmitry Tursunov (champion)
7. (Croatia) Ivo Karlović (quarterfinals)
8. (Spain) Fernando Verdasco (semifinals)

== Draw ==
Key

- Q = Qualifier
- WC = Wild card
- LL = Lucky loser
- Alt = Alternate
- ITF = ITF entry
- PR = Protected ranking
- SR = Special ranking
- SE = Special exempt
- JE = Junior exempt
- JR = Junior Accelerator Programme entrant
- CO = College Accelerator Programme entrant
- NG = Next Gen Accelerator Program entrant
- w/o = Walkover
- r = Retired
- d = Defaulted

=== Finals ===
Semifinals
(Germany) Benjamin Becker	3	6	6
3	(Czech Republic) Tomáš Berdych	6	4	4
8	(Spain) Fernando Verdasco	6^{4}	6	4
6	(Russia) Dmitry Tursunov	7^{7}	3	6

Final
(Germany) Benjamin Becker	2	1
6	(Russia) Dmitry Tursunov	6	6

=== Top half ===
First round
LL	(Switzerland) G Bastl	3	4
(Russia) I Kunitsyn	6	6
(United States) A Delić	5	1
Q	(Germany) D Meffert	7	6
Q	(Israel) H Levy	7	6^{4}	3
WC	(Thailand) D Udomchoke	5	7^{7}	6
(Germany) B Becker	7^{7}	6
5	(Spain) C Moyá	6^{5}	4
3	(Czech Republic) T Berdych	6	6
WC	(Thailand) K Wachiramanowang	3	0
(United States) M Russell	4	6	1
(Germany) M Zverev	6	3	6
LL	(Thailand) P Siriluethaiwattana	1	2
LL	(Germany) S Stadler	6	6
(Spain) F López	6^{2}	3
7	(Croatia) I Karlović	7^{7}	6

Second round
(Russia) I Kunitsyn	6	6^{6}	0
Q	(Germany) D Meffert	3	7^{8}	6
WC	(Thailand) D Udomchoke	2	3
(Germany) B Becker	6	6
3	(Czech Republic) T Berdych	6	6
(Germany) M Zverev	1	4
LL	(Germany) S Stadler	7^{7}	6^{4}	5
7	(Croatia) I Karlović	6^{3}	7^{7}	7

Quarterfinals
Q	(Germany) D Meffert	6^{2}	5
(Germany) B Becker	7^{7}	7
3	(Czech Republic) T Berdych	7	6
7	(Croatia) I Karlović	5	4

Semifinals
(Germany) B Becker	3	6	6
3	(Czech Republic) T Berdych	6	4	4

=== Bottom half ===
First round
8	(Spain) F Verdasco	6	6
LL	(United States) D Martin	2	1
(Argentina) J M del Potro	4	6	6^{4}
(Canada) F Dancevic	6	1	7^{7}
Q	(United States) Z Fleishman	5	2
(France) N Mahut	7	6
(United States) V Spadea	6	4	1
4	(Germany) T Haas	4	6	6
6	(Russia) D Tursunov	6	3	6
(Austria) W Eschauer	3	6	1
(Russia) T Gabashvili	6^{2}	5
(France) M Llodra	7^{7}	7
(United States) S Querrey	6	4	3
Q	(Australia) N Lindahl	2	6	6
WC	(Chinese Taipei) Y-t Wang	6	6
LL	(United States) P King	3	3

Second round
8	(Spain) F Verdasco	3	6	6
(Canada) F Dancevic	6	3	4
(France) N Mahut	6	6
4	(Germany) T Haas	4	4
6	(Russia) D Tursunov	6	6
(France) M Llodra	4	4
Q	(Australia) N Lindahl	3	3
WC	(Chinese Taipei) Y-t Wang	6	6

Quarterfinals
8	(Spain) F Verdasco	4	7^{7}	6
(France) N Mahut	6	6^{2}	4
6	(Russia) D Tursunov	4	6	6
WC	(Chinese Taipei) Y-t Wang	6	2	4

Semifinals
8	(Spain) F Verdasco	6^{4}	6	4
6	(Russia) D Tursunov	7^{7}	4	6
