= 2006 Thailand Open – Doubles =

Doubles
- 2006 Thailand Open

Final
- Champion: (Israel) Jonathan Erlich (Israel) Andy Ram
- Runner-up: (United Kingdom) Andy Murray (United Kingdom) Jamie Murray
- Score: 6–2, 2–6, [10–4]

Events
Singles	Doubles
← 2005 ·	Thailand Open	· 2007 →

The 2006 Thailand Open was a tennis tournament played on indoor hard courts. It was the 4th edition of the Thailand Open, and was part of the International Series of the 2006 ATP Tour. It took place at the Impact Arena in Bangkok, Thailand, from September 25 through October 1, 2006. Jonathan Erlich and Andy Ram won in the final 6–2, 2–6, [10–4] against Andy Murray and Jamie Murray.

== Seeds ==
1. (Israel) Jonathan Erlich / (Israel) Andy Ram (champions)
2. (Germany) Michael Kohlmann / (Germany) Alexander Waske (first round)
3. (Australia) Ashley Fisher / (United States) Tripp Phillips (semifinal)
4. (Australia) Stephen Huss / (United States) Jim Thomas (semifinal)

== Draw ==
=== Key ===
- Q = Qualifier
- WC = Wild card
- LL = Lucky loser
- Alt = Alternate
- SE = Special exempt
- PR = Protected ranking
- ITF = ITF entry
- JE = Junior exempt
- w/o = Walkover
- r = Retired
- d = Defaulted
- SR = Special ranking

=== Main draw ===
First round
1	(Israel) J Erlich (Israel) A Ram	7^{7}	6
(France) J Benneteau (South Africa) J Coetzee	6^{5}	4
(Germany) B Becker (Germany) L Burgsmüller	6	6^{2}	[6]
(Czech Republic) J Novák (Czech Republic) P Pála	3	7^{7}	[10]
3	(Australia) A Fisher (United States) T Phillips	6	6
(Sweden) J Landsberg (Finland) J Nieminen	2	1
WC	(Thailand) Sa Ratiwatana (Thailand) So Ratiwatana	3	4
(United States) E Butorac (United States) T Parrott	6	6
(South Africa) C Haggard (Australia) J Kerr	6	3	[10]
(United States) K Kim (South Korea) H-t Lee	3	6	[4]
WC	(Germany) R Schüttler (Thailand) D Udomchoke	6	6
4	(Australia) S Huss (United States) J Thomas	4	2
(United Kingdom) A Murray (United Kingdom) J Murray	3	7^{9}	[10]
(Canada) F Dancevic (United States) R Ginepri	6	6^{7}	[0]
(Spain) F López (Russia) M Safin	6	6
2	(Germany) M Kohlmann (Germany) A Waske	2	4

Quarterfinal
1	(Israel) J Erlich (Israel) A Ram	6	7^{7}
(Czech Republic) J Novák (Czech Republic) P Pála	3	6^{2}
3	(Australia) A Fisher (United States) T Phillips	2	7^{7}	[10]
(United States) E Butorac (United States) T Parrott	6	6^{5}	[8]
(South Africa) C Haggard (Australia) J Kerr	6	6
WC	(Germany) R Schüttler (Thailand) D Udomchoke	1	2
(United Kingdom) A Murray (United Kingdom) J Murray	6	6
(Spain) F López (Russia) M Safin	1	2

Semifinal
1	(Israel) J Erlich (Israel) A Ram	6	6
3	(Australia) A Fisher (United States) T Phillips	1	4
(South Africa) C Haggard (Australia) J Kerr	6^{2}	4
(United Kingdom) A Murray (United Kingdom) J Murray	7^{7}	6

Final
1	(Israel) J Erlich (Israel) A Ram	6	2	[10]
(United Kingdom) A Murray (United Kingdom) J Murray	2	6	[4]
