= 2010 PTT Thailand Open – Singles =

Singles
- 2010 PTT Thailand Open

Final
- Champion: (Spain) Guillermo García-López
- Runner-up: (Finland) Jarkko Nieminen
- Score: 6–4, 3–6, 6–4

Details
- Draw: 28
- Seeds: 8

Events
Singles	Doubles
- PTT Thailand Open

Gilles Simon was the defending champion, but chose not to participate.
Guillermo García-López, who eliminated World No.1 Rafael Nadal in the semifinals, won in the final against Jarkko Nieminen, 6–4, 3–6, 6–4 to become the first Spanish winner of this event.

== Seeds ==
1. (Spain) Rafael Nadal (semifinals)
2. (Spain) Fernando Verdasco (second round)
3. (Austria) Jürgen Melzer (quarterfinals)
4. (Latvia) Ernests Gulbis (quarterfinals)
5. (Argentina) Juan Martín del Potro (first round)
6. (Netherlands) Thiemo de Bakker (second round)
7. (Serbia) Viktor Troicki (second round)
8. (Germany) Michael Berrer (first round)

== Main draw ==
Key

- Q = Qualifier
- WC = Wild card
- LL = Lucky loser
- Alt = Alternate
- ITF = ITF entry
- PR = Protected ranking
- SR = Special ranking
- SE = Special exempt
- JE = Junior exempt
- JR = Junior Accelerator Programme entrant
- CO = College Accelerator Programme entrant
- NG = Next Gen Accelerator Program entrant
- w/o = Walkover
- r = Retired
- d = Defaulted

=== Finals ===
Semifinals
1	(Spain) Rafael Nadal	6	6^{3}	3
(Spain) Guillermo García-López	2	7^{7}	6
(Finland) Jarkko Nieminen	6	6
(Germany) Benjamin Becker	3	2

Final
(Spain) Guillermo García-López	6	3	6
(Finland) Jarkko Nieminen	4	6	4

=== Top half ===
First round
Q	(Belgium) R Bemelmans	6	6
Q	(Denmark) F Nielsen	2	3
Q	(United States) R DeHeart	3	7^{7}	4
(Kazakhstan) M Kukushkin	6	6^{4}	6
(Belgium) O Rochus	7^{9}	6
5	(Argentina) JM del Potro	6^{7}	4
(Germany) R Schüttler	6	6
(Brazil) R Mello	4	2
(Russia) T Gabashvili	7^{7}	4	4
(France) F Serra	6^{1}	6	6
(Spain) G García-López	6	7^{7}
8	(Germany) M Berrer	4	6^{4}

Second round
1	(Spain) R Nadal	6	6
Q	(Belgium) R Bemelmans	1	4
(Kazakhstan) M Kukushkin	6	5	6
(Belgium) O Rochus	4	7	3
4	(Latvia) E Gulbis	7^{7}	6^{4}	6
(Germany) R Schüttler	6^{4}	7^{7}	4
(France) F Serra	5	7^{7}	5
(Spain) G García-López	7	6^{3}	7

Quarterfinals
1	(Spain) R Nadal	6	6
(Kazakhstan) M Kukushkin	2	3
4	(Latvia) E Gulbis	6^{4}	6	3
(Spain) G García-López	7^{7}	4	6

Semifinals
1	(Spain) R Nadal	6	6^{3}	3
(Spain) G García-López	2	7^{7}	6

=== Bottom half ===
First round
7	(Serbia) V Troicki	6	6
(Switzerland) M Chiudinelli	3	1
(Finland) J Nieminen	6	6
WC	(Thailand) D Udomchoke	3	2
(Israel) D Sela	6	6
Q	(Russia) K Kravchuk	3	4
6	(Netherlands) T de Bakker	7	6
WC	(Spain) M López	5	0
(Germany) D Brands	6	6
(Ukraine) I Marchenko	3	4
(Germany) B Becker	6	6
SE	(Germany) M Zverev	1	4

Second round
7	(Serbia) V Troicki	6^{4}	2
(Finland) J Nieminen	7^{7}	6
(Israel) D Sela	3	4
3	(Austria) J Melzer	6	6
6	(Netherlands) T de Bakker	6^{2}	6	6^{7}
(Germany) D Brands	7^{7}	1	7^{9}
(Germany) B Becker	6	6
2/WC	(Spain) F Verdasco	4	4

Quarterfinals
(Finland) J Nieminen	6	7^{7}
3	(Austria) J Melzer	3	6^{4}
(Germany) D Brands	4	2
(Germany) B Becker	6	6

Semifinals
(Finland) J Nieminen	6	6
(Germany) B Becker	3	2
