= 2004 Thailand Open (tennis) =

- Date: 27 September – 3 October
- Edition: 2nd
- Category: International Series
- Surface: Hard / indoor
- Location: Bangkok, Thailand

Champions

Singles
- (Switzerland) Roger Federer

Doubles
- (United States) Justin Gimelstob / (United States) Graydon Oliver
← 2003 ·	Thailand Open	· 2005 →

The 2004 Thailand Open was a men's tennis tournament played on indoor hard courts. It was the 2nd edition of the Thailand Open, and was part of the International Series of the 2004 ATP Tour. It took place at the Impact Arena in Bangkok, Thailand, from 27 September through 3 October 2004. Roger Federer won the singles title.

== Finals ==
=== Singles ===
(Switzerland) Roger Federer defeated (United States) Andy Roddick, 6–4, 6–0

- It was Roger Federer's 10th title of the year, also his 21st overall.

=== Doubles ===
(United States) Justin Gimelstob / (United States) Graydon Oliver defeated (Switzerland) Yves Allegro / (Switzerland) Roger Federer, 5–7, 6–4, 6–4
