= 2004 Thailand Open – Singles =

Singles
- 2004 Thailand Open (ATP)

Final
- Champion: (Switzerland) Roger Federer
- Runner-up: (United States) Andy Roddick
- Score: 6–4, 6–0

Events
Singles	Doubles
← 2003 ·	Thailand Open (ATP)	· 2005 →

Roger Federer won in the final 6–4, 6–0 against Andy Roddick.

== Seeds ==
1. (Switzerland) Roger Federer (champion)
2. (United States) Andy Roddick (final)
3. (Russia) Marat Safin (semifinals)
4. (Thailand) Paradorn Srichaphan (semifinals)
5. (United States) Taylor Dent (second round)
6. (Spain) Feliciano López (first round)
7. (Russia) Igor Andreev (first round)
8. (Sweden) Robin Söderling (quarterfinals)

== Draw ==
=== Key ===
- Q = Qualifier
- WC = Wild card
- LL = Lucky loser
- Alt = Alternate
- SE = Special exempt
- PR = Protected ranking
- ITF = ITF entry
- JE = Junior exempt
- w/o = Walkover
- r = Retired
- d = Defaulted
- SR = Special ranking

=== Finals ===
Semifinals
1	(Switzerland) Roger Federer	7	2	6
4	(Thailand) Paradorn Srichaphan	5	6	3
3	(Russia) Marat Safin	6^{1}	7^{7}	6^{2}
2	(United States) Andy Roddick	7^{7}	6^{0}	7^{7}

Final
1	(Switzerland) Roger Federer	6	6
2	(United States) Andy Roddick	4	0

=== Top half ===
First round
1	(Switzerland) R Federer	6	7^{7}
(France) N Thomann	4	6^{4}
(Hungary) A Sávolt	4	1
(Switzerland) I Heuberger	6	6
(Australia) P Baccanello	7^{7}	1	7^{7}
(Switzerland) M Rosset	6^{2}	6	6^{4}
(Israel) H Levy	3	4
8	(Sweden) R Söderling	6	6
4	(Thailand) P Srichaphan	6	7^{7}
(Switzerland) M Chiudinelli	4	6^{3}
Q	(Australia) J Crabb	3	2
(United States) A Bogomolov Jr.	6	6
(Netherlands) D van Scheppingen	4	7	6
WC	(Serbia and Montenegro) N Djokovic	6	5	4
(United States) J Gimelstob	6	4	4
5	(United States) T Dent	4	6	6

Second round
1	(Switzerland) R Federer	6	6
(Switzerland) I Heuberger	1	3
(Australia) P Baccanello	1	3
8	(Sweden) R Söderling	6	6
4	(Thailand) P Srichaphan	6	7^{7}
(United States) A Bogomolov Jr.	0	6^{4}
(Netherlands) D van Scheppingen	6	6
5	(United States) T Dent	0	4

Quarterfinals
1	(Switzerland) R Federer	7^{7}	6
8	(Sweden) R Söderling	6^{3}	4
4	(Thailand) P Srichaphan	6	7
(Netherlands) D van Scheppingen	2	5

Semifinals
1	(Switzerland) R Federer	7	2	6
4	(Thailand) P Srichaphan	5	6	3

=== Bottom half ===
First round
7	(Russia) I Andreev	1	2
Q	(Netherlands) R Wassen	6	6
(Brazil) F Saretta	6	6
WC	(India) P Amritraj	3	3
WC	(Thailand) D Udomchoke	6	5	2
(Czech Republic) J Vaněk	3	7	6
(Israel) N Okun	2	3
3	(Russia) M Safin	6	6
6	(Spain) F López	6	2	6^{5}
(Sweden) T Johansson	1	6	7^{7}
Q	(Japan) S Iwabuchi	6^{5}	3
(Chile) A García	7^{7}	6
(United States) J Morrison	6	6
Q	(Germany) M Kohlmann	3	4
LL	(United Kingdom) A Parmar	1	4
2	(United States) A Roddick	6	6

Second round
Q	(Netherlands) R Wassen	6	1	2
(Brazil) F Saretta	3	6	6
(Czech Republic) J Vaněk	3	3
3	(Russia) M Safin	6	6
(Sweden) T Johansson	6	6
(Chile) A García	3	3
(United States) J Morrison	2	7^{7}	4
2	(United States) A Roddick	6	6^{4}	6

Quarterfinals
(Brazil) F Saretta	2	1
3	(Russia) M Safin	6	6
(Sweden) T Johansson	3	4
2	(United States) A Roddick	6	6

Semifinals
3	(Russia) M Safin	6^{1}	7^{7}	6^{2}
2	(United States) A Roddick	7^{7}	6^{0}	7^{7}
