= 2003 Thailand Open – Doubles =

Doubles
- 2003 Thailand Open

Final
- Champions: (Israel) Jonathan Erlich (Israel) Andy Ram
- Runners-up: (Australia) Andrew Kratzmann (Finland) Jarkko Nieminen
- Score: 6–3, 7–6^{(7–4)}

Events
Singles	Doubles
Thailand Open	· 2004 →

Jonathan Erlich and Andy Ram won in the final 6–3, 7–6^{(7–4)} against Andrew Kratzmann and Jarkko Nieminen.

== Seeds ==
1. (South Africa) Jeff Coetzee / (South Africa) Chris Haggard (first round)
2. (United States) Rick Leach / (United States) Brian MacPhie (first round)
3. (Australia) Andrew Kratzmann / (Finland) Jarkko Nieminen (final)
4. (Israel) Jonathan Erlich / (Israel) Andy Ram (champions)

== Draw ==
=== Key ===
- Q = Qualifier
- WC = Wild card
- LL = Lucky loser
- Alt = Alternate
- SE = Special exempt
- PR = Protected ranking
- ITF = ITF entry
- JE = Junior exempt
- w/o = Walkover
- r = Retired
- d = Defaulted
- SR = Special ranking

First round
1	(South Africa) J Coetzee (South Africa) C Haggard	6	5	2
(Austria) W Eschauer (Netherlands) R Wassen	4	7	6
WC	(Thailand) Sa Ratiwatana (Thailand) So Ratiwatana	6^{3}	4
(Switzerland) Y Allegro (Switzerland) M Chiudinelli	7^{7}	6
4	(Israel) J Erlich (Israel) A Ram	6	6
(Italy) G Galimberti (Italy) D Sanguinetti	2	1
(Croatia) M Ančić (Croatia) I Ljubičić	6	6
(United States) J Marshall (Peru) I Miranda	3	0
(Australia) J Crabb (United States) T Dent	6	4	2
WC	(Thailand) N Srichaphan (Thailand) P Srichaphan	2	6	6
(Australia) S Huss (South Africa) M Wakefield	4	5
3	(Australia) A Kratzmann (Finland) J Nieminen	6	7
(France) G Carraz (South Africa) W Moodie	6	6
(Czech Republic) P Luxa (Czech Republic) B Ulihrach	3	2
(France) F Santoro (France) C Saulnier	7^{10}	6
2	(United States) R Leach (United States) B MacPhie	6^{8}	4

Quarterfinals
(Austria) W Eschauer (Netherlands) R Wassen	3	6^{3}
(Switzerland) Y Allegro (Switzerland) M Chiudinelli	6	7^{7}
4	(Israel) J Erlich (Israel) A Ram	6^{0}	6	6
(Croatia) M Ančić (Croatia) I Ljubičić	7^{7}	4	1
WC	(Thailand) N Srichaphan (Thailand) P Srichaphan	3	4
3	(Australia) A Kratzmann (Finland) J Nieminen	6	6
(France) G Carraz (South Africa) W Moodie	w/o
(France) F Santoro (France) C Saulnier

Semifinals
(Switzerland) Y Allegro (Switzerland) M Chiudinelli	3	4
4	(Israel) J Erlich (Israel) A Ram	6	6
3	(Australia) A Kratzmann (Finland) J Nieminen	7^{9}	6
(France) G Carraz (South Africa) W Moodie	6^{7}	3

Final
4	(Israel) J Erlich (Israel) A Ram	6	7^{7}
3	(Australia) A Kratzmann (Finland) J Nieminen	3	6^{4}
