= 2008 Thailand Open – Doubles =

Doubles
- 2008 Thailand Open

Final
- Champions: (Czech Republic) Lukáš Dlouhý (India) Leander Paes
- Runners-up: (United States) Scott Lipsky (United States) David Martin
- Score: 6–4, 7–6^{(7–4)}

Events
Singles	Doubles
← 2007 ·	Thailand Open	· 2009 →

Sanchai Ratiwatana and Sonchat Ratiwatana were the defending champions. Still, they lost in the first round to Julien Benneteau and Nicolas Mahut.

Lukáš Dlouhý and Leander Paes won in the final 6–4, 7–6^{(7–4)}, against Scott Lipsky and David Martin.

== Seeds ==
1. (Czech Republic) Lukáš Dlouhý / (India) Leander Paes (champions)
2. (Sweden) Simon Aspelin / (Austria) Julian Knowle (first round)
3. (Sweden) Robert Lindstedt / (Germany) Philipp Petzschner (quarterfinals)
4. (Austria) Jürgen Melzer / (Finland) Jarkko Nieminen (first round)

== Draw ==
=== Key ===
- Q = Qualifier
- WC = Wild card
- LL = Lucky loser
- Alt = Alternate
- SE = Special exempt
- PR = Protected ranking
- ITF = ITF entry
- JE = Junior exempt
- w/o = Walkover
- r = Retired
- d = Defaulted
- SR = Special ranking

=== Draw ===
First round
1	(Czech Republic) L Dlouhý (India) L Paes	7^{7}	4	[10]
(India) R Bopanna (Pakistan) A-u-H Qureshi	6^{3}	6	[7]
(Czech Republic) T Berdych (Italy) S Bolelli	6	6
(Australia) J Kerr (Australia) T Perry	3	3
3	(Sweden) R Lindstedt (Germany) P Petzschner	7	6
WC	(Thailand) D Udomchoke (Thailand) K Wachiramanowong	5	3
WC	(Serbia) M Djokovic (Serbia) N Djokovic	2	2
(France) F Santoro (France) J-W Tsonga	6	6
(Sweden) R Söderling (Netherlands) R Wassen	6	7^{7}
(France) G Monfils (Serbia) V Troicki	4	6^{4}
(United States) S Lipsky (United States) D Martin	6	7^{8}
4	(Austria) J Melzer (Finland) J Nieminen	2	6^{6}
(Thailand) S Ratiwatana (Thailand) S Ratiwatana	6	5	[6]
(France) J Benneteau (France) N Mahut	4	7	[10]
(Russia) M Safin (Germany) M Zverev	6	6
2	(Sweden) S Aspelin (Austria) J Knowle	3	4

Quarterfinals
1	(Czech Republic) L Dlouhý (India) L Paes	6	6
(Czech Republic) T Berdych (Italy) S Bolelli	1	2
3	(Sweden) R Lindstedt (Germany) P Petzschner	6	4	[4]
(France) F Santoro (France) J-W Tsonga	0	6	[10]
(Sweden) R Söderling (Netherlands) R Wassen	3	5
(United States) S Lipsky (United States) D Martin	6	7
(France) J Benneteau (France) N Mahut	7	6
(Russia) M Safin (Germany) M Zverev	5	2

Semifinals
1	(Czech Republic) L Dlouhý (India) L Paes	6	6
(France) F Santoro (France) J-W Tsonga	4	2
(United States) S Lipsky (United States) D Martin	6	3	[10]
(France) J Benneteau (France) N Mahut	3	6	[7]

Final
1	(Czech Republic) L Dlouhý (India) L Paes	6	7^{7}
(United States) S Lipsky (United States) D Martin	4	6^{4}
