= 2006 Thailand Open (tennis) =

- Date: 25 September – 1 October
- Edition: 4th
- Category: International Series
- Location: Bangkok, Thailand
- Venue: Impact Arena

Champions

Singles
- (United States) James Blake

Doubles
- (United States) Justin Gimelstob / (United States) Graydon Oliver
← 2005 ·	Thailand Open	· 2007 →

The 2006 Thailand Open was a men's tennis tournament played on indoor hard courts. It was the 4th edition of the Thailand Open, and was part of the International Series of the 2006 ATP Tour. It took place at the Impact Arena in Bangkok, Thailand, from 25 September through 1 October 2006. James Blake won the singles title.

== Entrants ==
=== Seeds ===
Country	Player	Rank	Seed
CRO	Ivan Ljubičić	3	1
CYP	Marcos Baghdatis	8	2
USA	James Blake	9	3
GBR	Andy Murray	16	4
FIN	Jarkko Nieminen	17	5
ESP	Juan Carlos Ferrero	18	6
USA	Robby Ginepri	40	7
THA	Paradorn Srichaphan	41	8

- Rankings are as of September 25, 2006.

=== Other entrants ===
The following players received wildcards into the main draw:

- (Russia) Mikhail Ledovskikh
- (Spain) Feliciano López
- (Croatia) Marin Čilić

The following players received entry from the qualifying draw:

- (Switzerland) George Bastl
- (Sweden) Michael Ryderstedt
- (Germany) Lars Burgsmüller
- (Germany) Mischa Zverev

The following players received the Lucky loser spot:

- (Monaco) Benjamin Balleret
- (Japan) Satoshi Iwabuchi

== Finals ==
=== Singles ===
(United States) James Blake defeated (Croatia) Ivan Ljubičić, 6–3, 6–1.

=== Doubles ===
(Israel) Jonathan Erlich / (Israel) Andy Ram defeated (United Kingdom) Andy Murray / (United Kingdom) Jamie Murray, 6–2, 2–6, [10–4].
