= 2003 Thailand Open =

- Date: 22–29 September
- Edition: 1st
- Category: International Series
- Draw: 32S / 16D
- Prize money: $525,000
- Location: Bangkok, Thailand
- Venue: Impact Arena

Champions

Singles
- (United States) Taylor Dent

Doubles
- (Israel) Jonathan Erlich / (Israel) Andy Ram
Thailand Open	· 2004 →

The 2003 Thailand Open was a men's tennis tournament played on indoor hard courts. It was the inaugural edition of the Thailand Open, and was part of the International Series of the 2003 ATP Tour. It took place at the Impact Arena in Bangkok, Thailand, from 22 September through 29 September 2003. Eight-seeded Taylor Dent won the singles title.

== Finals ==
=== Singles ===
(United States) Taylor Dent defeated (Spain) Juan Carlos Ferrero, 6–3, 7–6^{(7–5)}

- It was Dent's 2nd title of the year, and his 3rd overall.

=== Doubles ===
(Israel) Jonathan Erlich / (Israel) Andy Ram defeated (Australia) Andrew Kratzmann / (Finland) Jarkko Nieminen, 6–3, 7–6^{(7–4)}

- It was Jonathan Erlich's 1st title of the year, also 2nd overall. It was Andy Ram's 2nd title of the year and his 2nd overall. This marked the team's 1st title.
