= 2005 Thailand Open – Singles =

Singles
- 2005 Thailand Open

Final
- Champion: (Switzerland) Roger Federer
- Runner-up: (United Kingdom) Andy Murray
- Score: 6–3, 7–5

Events
Singles	Doubles
- Thailand Open

The 2005 Thailand Open was a tennis tournament played on indoor hard courts. It was the 3rd edition of the Thailand Open, and was part of the International Series of the 2005 ATP Tour. It took place at the Impact Arena in Bangkok, Thailand, from September 26 through October 2, 2005.

Defending champion Roger Federer won in the final 6–3, 7–5 against Andy Murray. He did not lose a single set in the entire tournament. By reaching the final, Murray entered the ATP's Top 100 for the first time.

== Seeds ==
1. (Switzerland) Roger Federer (champion)
2. (Australia) Lleyton Hewitt (quarterfinals, withdrew)
3. (United States) Robby Ginepri (quarterfinals)
4. (Germany) Tommy Haas (second round)
5. (Sweden) Robin Söderling (second round)
6. (Finland) Jarkko Nieminen (semifinals)
7. (Thailand) Paradorn Srichaphan (semifinals)
8. (Peru) Luis Horna (second round)

== Draw ==
Key

- Q = Qualifier
- WC = Wild card
- LL = Lucky loser
- Alt = Alternate
- ITF = ITF entry
- PR = Protected ranking
- SR = Special ranking
- SE = Special exempt
- JE = Junior exempt
- JR = Junior Accelerator Programme entrant
- CO = College Accelerator Programme entrant
- NG = Next Gen Accelerator Program entrant
- w/o = Walkover
- r = Retired
- d = Defaulted

=== Finals ===
Semifinals
1	(Switzerland) Roger Federer	6	6
6	(Finland) Jarkko Nieminen	3	4
WC	(United Kingdom) Andrew Murray	6^{3}	7	6
7	(Thailand) Paradorn Srichaphan	7^{7}	5	2

Final
1	(Switzerland) Roger Federer	6	7
WC	(United Kingdom) Andrew Murray	3	5

=== Top half ===
First round
1	(Switzerland) R Federer	7^{7}	6
(Brazil) M Daniel	6^{4}	4
(Croatia) R Karanušić	2	5
Q	(Germany) D Gremelmayr	6	7
(Luxembourg) G Müller	7^{7}	2	7
WC	(Australia) M Philippoussis	6^{5}	6	5
(Czech Republic) I Minář	6	6^{6}	4
8	(Peru) L Horna	4	7^{8}	6
4	(Germany) T Haas	6	4	6
(Georgia (country)) I Labadze	3	6	4
Q	(United States) K Kim	3	6^{8}
(Chinese Taipei) J Wang	6	7^{10}
(Spain) Á Calatrava	6	3	5
PR	(Russia) D Tursunov	2	6	7
PR	(Slovakia) K Kučera	1	1^{r}
6	(Finland) J Nieminen	6	3

Second round
1	(Switzerland) R Federer	6	6
Q	(Germany) D Gremelmayr	3	2
(Luxembourg) G Müller	6^{4}	7^{7}	6
8	(Peru) L Horna	7^{7}	6^{4}	3
4	(Germany) T Haas	5	3
(Chinese Taipei) J Wang	7	6
PR	(Russia) D Tursunov	6^{2}	4
6	(Finland) J Nieminen	7^{7}	6

Quarterfinals
1	(Switzerland) R Federer	6	6
(Luxembourg) G Müller	4	3
(Chinese Taipei) J Wang	4	7^{7}	4
6	(Finland) J Nieminen	6	6^{3}	6

Semifinals
1	(Switzerland) R Federer	6	6
6	(Finland) J Nieminen	3	4

=== Bottom half ===
First round
5	(Sweden) R Söderling	4	6	6
(Czech Republic) R Vik	6	1	2
(Switzerland) G Bastl	2	4
WC	(United Kingdom) A Murray	6	6
(Belgium) D Norman	4	6^{3}
Q	(France) N Thomann	6	7^{7}
(Thailand) D Udomchoke	6	3	1
3	(United States) R Ginepri	4	6	6
7	(Thailand) P Srichaphan	6	6
Q	(Taiwan) T Chen	3	4
Q	(United States) J P Fruttero	6	3	6^{4}
(Spain) G García López	3	6	7^{7}
(United States) J Gimelstob	6	6
(Ecuador) N Lapentti	4	3
(Czech Republic) L Dlouhý	3	6	5
2	(Australia) L Hewitt	6	3	7

Second round
5	(Sweden) R Söderling	6^{3}	6^{5}
WC	(United Kingdom) A Murray	7^{7}	7^{7}
Q	(France) N Thomann	3	6^{4}
3	(United States) R Ginepri	6	7^{7}
7	(Thailand) P Srichaphan	7	6
(Spain) G García López	5	4
(United States) J Gimelstob	4	7	6^{9}
2	(Australia) L Hewitt	6	5	7^{11}

Quarterfinals
WC	(United Kingdom) A Murray	7^{7}	7^{7}
(United States) R Ginepri	6^{3}	6^{5}
7	(Thailand) P Srichaphan
2	(Australia) L Hewitt	w/o

Semifinals
WC	(United Kingdom) A Murray	6^{3}	7	6
7	(Thailand) P Srichaphan	7^{7}	5	2

Qualifying
