= 2008 Thailand Open – Singles =

Singles
- 2008 Thailand Open

Final
- Champion: (France) Jo-Wilfried Tsonga
- Runner-up: (Serbia) Novak Djokovic
- Score: 7–6^{(7–4)}, 6–4

Details
- Draw: 28 (4Q / 3WC)
- Seeds: 8

Events
Singles	Doubles
- Thailand Open

Dmitry Tursunov was the defending champion, but chose not to participate that year.

Jo-Wilfried Tsonga won in the final 7–6^{(7–4)}, 6–4, against Novak Djokovic.

== Seeds ==
The top four seeds receive a bye into the second round.

1. (Serbia) Novak Djokovic (final)
2. (France) Jo-Wilfried Tsonga (champion)
3. (Czech Republic) Tomáš Berdych (semifinals)
4. (France) Gaël Monfils (semifinals)
5. (Finland) Jarkko Nieminen (second round)
6. (Sweden) Robin Söderling (quarterfinals)
7. (Russia) Marat Safin (first round)
8. (Austria) Jürgen Melzer (quarterfinals)

== Draw ==
Key

- Q = Qualifier
- WC = Wild card
- LL = Lucky loser
- Alt = Alternate
- ITF = ITF entry
- PR = Protected ranking
- SR = Special ranking
- SE = Special exempt
- JE = Junior exempt
- JR = Junior Accelerator Programme entrant
- CO = College Accelerator Programme entrant
- NG = Next Gen Accelerator Program entrant
- w/o = Walkover
- r = Retired
- d = Defaulted

=== Finals ===
Semifinals
1	(Serbia) Novak Djokovic	7	6
3	(Czech Republic) Tomáš Berdych	5	1
4	(France) Gaël Monfils	0	3
2	(France) Jo-Wilfried Tsonga	6	6

Final
1	(Serbia) Novak Djokovic	6^{4}	4
2	(France) Jo-Wilfried Tsonga	7^{7}	6

=== Top half ===
First round
(France) J Benneteau	5	1
Q	(Germany) S Stadler	7	6
(Germany) M Berrer	4	3
(Russia) T Gabashvili	6	6
Q	(Pakistan) A-u-H Qureshi	2	4
6	(Sweden) R Söderling	6	6
(Brazil) T Bellucci	3	3
(Italy) S Bolelli	6	6
WC	(Thailand) D Udomchoke	2	7^{7}	2
(France) N Mahut	6	6^{5}	6
WC	(Serbia) M Djokovic	2	0
5	(Finland) J Nieminen	6	6

Second round
1	(Serbia) N Djokovic	6	6
Q	(Germany) S Stadler	1	3
(Russia) T Gabashvili	1	3
6	(Sweden) R Söderling	6	6
3	(Czech Republic) T Berdych	7	6
(Italy) S Bolelli	5	1
(France) N Mahut	6	3	6
5	(Finland) J Nieminen	4	6	3

Quarterfinals
1	(Serbia) N Djokovic	6	7
6	(Sweden) R Söderling	4	5
3	(Czech Republic) T Berdych	7^{8}	6
(France) N Mahut	6^{6}	3

Semifinals
1	(Serbia) N Djokovic	7	6
3	(Czech Republic) T Berdych	5	1

=== Bottom half ===
First round
7	(Russia) M Safin	4	6^{4}
(Germany) P Petzschner	6	7^{7}
(Germany) M Zverev	6	6
WC	(Australia) R Smeets	4	4
Q	(Switzerland) G Bastl	3	6^{4}
(United States) R Kendrick	6	7^{7}
8	(Austria) J Melzer	6	6
(United States) D Young	3	3
(France) F Santoro	6^{4}	2
(Serbia) V Troicki	7^{7}	6
Q	(Czech Republic) L Dlouhý	6	7^{7}
(Germany) B Becker	4	6^{4}

Second round
(Germany) P Petzschner	7^{7}	3	6
(Germany) M Zverev	6^{3}	6	3
(United States) R Kendrick	4	6^{4}
4	(France) G Monfils	6	7^{7}
8	(Austria) J Melzer	6	7^{7}
(Serbia) V Troicki	4	6^{4}
Q	(Czech Republic) L Dlouhý	6^{9}	6	6^{1}
2	(France) J-W Tsonga	7^{11}	3	7^{7}

Quarterfinals
(Germany) P Petzschner	6^{6}	4
4	(France) G Monfils	7^{8}	6
8	(Austria) J Melzer	3	2
2	(France) J-W Tsonga	6	6

Semifinals
4	(France) G Monfils	0	3
2	(France) J-W Tsonga	6	6
