= 2003 Thailand Open – Singles =

Singles
- 2003 Thailand Open

Final
- Champion: (United States) Taylor Dent
- Runner-up: (Spain) Juan Carlos Ferrero
- Score: 6–3, 7–6^{(7–5)}

Events
Singles	Doubles
- Thailand Open

Taylor Dent won in the final 6–3, 7–6^{(7–5)} against Juan Carlos Ferrero.

== Seeds ==
1. (Spain) Juan Carlos Ferrero (final)
2. (United States) ~~Andy Roddick~~ (withdrew because of a hamstring injury)
3. (Spain) Carlos Moyá (quarterfinals)
4. (Thailand) Paradorn Srichaphan (quarterfinals)
5. (Finland) Jarkko Nieminen (semifinals)
6. (Croatia) Ivan Ljubičić (semifinals)
7. (France) Fabrice Santoro (first round)
8. (United States) Taylor Dent (champion)

== Draw ==
Key

- Q = Qualifier
- WC = Wild card
- LL = Lucky loser
- Alt = Alternate
- ITF = ITF entry
- PR = Protected ranking
- SR = Special ranking
- SE = Special exempt
- JE = Junior exempt
- JR = Junior Accelerator Programme entrant
- CO = College Accelerator Programme entrant
- NG = Next Gen Accelerator Program entrant
- w/o = Walkover
- r = Retired
- d = Defaulted

=== Finals ===
Semifinals
1	(Spain) Juan Carlos Ferrero	6	6
6	(Croatia) Ivan Ljubičić	3	3
5	(Finland) Jarkko Nieminen	6^{3}	2
8	(United States) Taylor Dent	7^{7}	6

Final
1	(Spain) Juan Carlos Ferrero	3	6^{5}
8	(United States) Taylor Dent	6	7^{7}

=== Top half ===
First round
1	(Spain) J C Ferrero	7	7^{7}
(Belgium) D Norman	5	6^{5}
(Italy) G Galimberti	3	3
(United States) A Bogomolov Jr.	6	6
(Germany) A Popp	7	6
(Austria) W Eschauer	5	3
(France) G Carraz	3	7^{10}	6
7	(France) F Santoro	6	6^{8}	1
4	(Thailand) P Srichaphan	0	6	6
(Belarus) V Voltchkov	6	3	2
(Denmark) K Carlsen	3	6	7^{7}
WC	(Israel) A Ram	6	3	6^{5}
Q	(Switzerland) M Chiudinelli	4	6	3
(Croatia) M Ančić	6	4	6
(France) C Saulnier	7	3	6^{4}
6	(Croatia) I Ljubičić	5	6	7^{7}

Second round
1	(Spain) J C Ferrero	6	6^{4}	6
(United States) A Bogomolov Jr.	3	7^{7}	1
(Germany) A Popp	5	2
(France) G Carraz	7	6
4	(Thailand) P Srichaphan	6	7^{7}
(Denmark) K Carlsen	3	6^{5}
(Croatia) M Ančić	1	4
6	(Croatia) I Ljubičić	6	6

Quarterfinals
1	(Spain) J C Ferrero	6	3	7^{7}
(France) G Carraz	4	6	6^{2}
4	(Thailand) P Srichaphan	6	6^{4}	5
6	(Croatia) I Ljubičić	4	7^{7}	7

Semifinals
1	(Spain) J C Ferrero	6	6
6	(Croatia) I Ljubičić	3	3

=== Bottom half ===
First round
5	(Finland) J Nieminen	6	6
WC	(Thailand) D Udomchoke	4	1
(Czech Republic) B Ulihrach	6	6
(Italy) D Sanguinetti	2	3
(United States) B Vahaly	7	2
Q	(Australia) J Crabb	5	1^{r}
Q	(Czech Republic) P Luxa	4	3
3	(Spain) C Moyá	6	6
8	(United States) T Dent	6	6
(South Africa) W Moodie	1	4
(Peru) I Miranda	3	2
(France) T Ascione	6	6
(France) N Thomann	5	6	6
WC	(India) P Amritraj	7	3	3
Q	(Israel) J Erlich	7	1	6
LL	(Thailand) S Ratiwatana	5	6	4

Second round
5	(Finland) J Nieminen	6	6
(Czech Republic) B Ulihrach	4	2
(United States) B Vahaly	5	4
3	(Spain) C Moyá	7	6
8	(United States) T Dent	6	6
(France) T Ascione	1	2
(France) N Thomann	6	6
Q	(Israel) J Erlich	4	0

Quarterfinals
5	(Finland) J Nieminen	6^{5}	6	6
3	(Spain) C Moyá	7^{7}	4	4
8	(United States) T Dent	6
(France) N Thomann	3	r

Semifinals
5	(Finland) J Nieminen	6^{3}	2
8	(United States) T Dent	7^{7}	6
