= Paul Baccanello =

Australian professional tennis player

- Country (sports): Australia
- Residence: Adelaide
- Born: 12 June 1979 (age 46) Adelaide
- Height: 1.83 m (6 ft 0 in)
- Turned pro: June 1998
- Retired: July 2007
- Plays: Right-handed
- Coach: Brent Larkham
- Prize money: $261,855

Singles
- Career record: 2–8
- Career titles: 0
- Highest ranking: No. 129 (3 November 2003)

Grand Slam singles results
- Australian Open: 1R (2005)
- French Open: Q3 (2003)
- Wimbledon: 2R (2003)
- US Open: Q2 (2003)

Doubles
- Career record: 4–8
- Career titles: 0
- Highest ranking: No. 169 (9 June 2003)

Grand Slam doubles results
- Australian Open: 3R (2003)
- Last updated on: 16 April 2021.

Paul Baccanello (born 12 June 1979, in Adelaide) is a former Australian professional tennis player. He sustained various injuries during his career, which hampered his results.

== Career ==
Baccanello managed to qualify for the main draw at Wimbledon in 2003. He defeated former top 100 player Ivo Heuberger in the first round, before falling in a tight four set match to Croatian Ivo Karlović in the second round. As a result, he earned a career best prize-money of over $23,000 and rose 37 places in the ATP rankings. In arguably his best performance to date, he did manage to reach the semi-finals of the Challenger event at Segovia in 2003, where he played Rafael Nadal. In a close match, Baccanello took Rafael to a tie-break in the first set, before Nadal took control in the second set, winning 7–6, 6–4. His career high singles ranking of 129 was achieved on 3 November 2003, after other strong performances on the Challenger circuit.

Baccanello currently has a 2–8 ATP record and has earned a total of $261,855 prize money in his career.

== Challenger and Futures Finals ==
=== Singles: 16 (4–12) ===
Legend (singles) ATP Challenger Tour (0–3) ITF Futures Tour (4–9)	Titles by surface Hard (0–8) Clay (3–2) Grass (1–1) Carpet (0–1)

Result	W–L	Date	Tournament	Tier	Surface	Opponent	Score
Loss	0–1	Oct 1999	Australia F1, Melbourne	Futures	Clay	(Australia) Ben Ellwood	3–6, 2–6
Loss	0–2	May 2000	Japan F5, Osaka	Futures	Hard	(South Korea) Yong-Il Yoon	4–6, 7–6^{(7–4)}, 4–6
Loss	0–3	Aug 2000	Great Britain F7, Hampstead	Futures	Hard (i)	(Denmark) Frederik Fetterlein	4–1, 4–5^{(6–8)}, 2–4,4–5
Loss	0–4	Nov 2000	Australia F3, Berri	Futures	Grass	(Serbia) Dejan Petrović	3–6, 4–6
Loss	0–5	Apr 2001	Australia F2, Brisbane	Futures	Hard	(Australia) Todd Larkham	5–7, 6–4, 6–7^{(1–7)}
Win	1–5	May 2001	Germany F3, Mannheim	Futures	Clay	(Spain) Gorka Fraile	4–6, 6–2, 6–3
Win	2–5	Aug 2002	Denmark F2, Rungsted	Futures	Clay	(Croatia) Roko Karanušić	6–0, 6–1
Win	3–5	Nov 2002	Australia F4, Melbourne	Futures	Grass	(Australia) Todd Larkham	6–3, 7–6^{(9–7)}
Loss	3–6	Nov 2002	Australia F5, Berri	Futures	Hard	(Australia) Alun Jones	2–6, 2–6
Loss	3–7	Mar 2003	Tasmania, Australia	Challenger	Hard	(Japan) Satoshi Iwabuchi	2–6, 3–6
Loss	3–8	Mar 2003	Australia F1, Burnie	Futures	Hard	(Israel) Dudi Sela	3–4 ret.
Loss	3–9	Aug 2005	Vancouver, Canada	Challenger	Hard	(Israel) Dudi Sela	2–6, 3–6
Loss	3–10	Jun 2006	Italy F16, Cesena	Futures	Clay	(Romania) Victor Ioniță	3–6, 6–4, 6–7^{(5–7)}
Loss	3–11	Jul 2006	Ireland F2, Dublin	Futures	Carpet	(Germany) Mischa Zverev	4–6, 6–7^{(3–7)}
Win	4–11	Sep 2006	Spain F29, Móstoles	Futures	Clay	(Spain) Guillermo Alcaide	3–6, 6–4, 6–4
Loss	4–12	May 2007	Lanzarote, Spain	Challenger	Hard	(France) Jo-Wilfried Tsonga	2–6, 2–6

=== Doubles: 16 (9–7) ===
Legend (doubles) ATP Challenger Tour (5–2) ITF Futures Tour (4–5)	Titles by surface Hard (3–4) Clay (5–2) Grass (1–1) Carpet (0–0)

Result	W–L	Date	Tournament	Tier	Surface	Partner	Opponents	Score
Loss	0–1	Dec 1999	Perth, Australia	Challenger	Hard	(Australia) Josh Tuckfield	(Australia) Paul Kilderry (Australia) Grant Silcock	4–6, 6–7^{(5–7)}
Loss	0–2	Apr 2000	China F1, Beijing	Futures	Hard	(Australia) Josh Tuckfield	(Japan) Tasuku Iwami (Japan) Takahiro Terachi	2–6, 6–7^{(4–7)}
Win	1–2	Nov 2000	Australia F2, Melbourne	Futures	Clay	(Australia) Josh Tuckfield	(Australia) Stephen Huss (Australia) Lee Pearson	7–6^{(7–4)}, 4–6, 6–1
Win	2–2	Nov 2000	Australia F3, Berri	Futures	Grass	(Australia) Dejan Petrović	(Australia) Stephen Huss (Australia) Lee Pearson	6–3, 6–4
Loss	2–3	May 2001	Germany F2, Esslingen	Futures	Clay	(Croatia) Ivo Karlović	(Germany) Franz Stauder (Germany) Alexander Waske	5–7, 6–1, 4–6
Loss	2–4	Apr 2002	Australia F2, Burnie	Futures	Hard	(Australia) Dejan Petrović	(Australia) Jaymon Crabb (Australia) Joseph Sirianni	6–2, 6–7^{(5–7)}, 1–6
Win	3–4	Sep 2002	Spain F12, Santander	Futures	Clay	(Spain) Diego Hipperdinger	(Spain) David Ortiz-D'jian (Spain) José Antonio Sánchez de Luna	6–4, 6–3
Win	4–4	Sep 2002	Budapest, Hungary	Challenger	Clay	(Argentina) Sergio Roitman	(Norway) Jan Frode Andersen (Germany) Oliver Gross	6–4, 6–7^{(5–7)}, 6–5 ret.
Loss	4–5	Sep 2002	Maia, Portugal	Challenger	Clay	(Australia) Todd Perry	(Argentina) Sebastián Prieto (Argentina) Sergio Roitman	4–6, 4–6
Loss	4–6	Nov 2002	Australia F3, Melbourne	Futures	Grass	(Australia) Nathan Healey	(Australia) Mark Hlawaty (Australia) Sadik Kadir	6–7^{(4–7)}, 4–6
Win	5–6	Nov 2002	Australia F3, Berri	Futures	Hard	(Australia) Nathan Healey	(Australia) Mark Hlawaty (Australia) Sadik Kadir	7–6^{(7–1)}, 6–7^{(4–7)}, [10-8]
Win	6–6	Jun 2003	Sassuolo, Italy	Challenger	Clay	(Italy) Stefano Galvani	(Italy) Enzo Artoni (Argentina) Martín Vassallo Argüello	7–5, 2–6, 7–5
Win	7–6	Sep 2003	Grenoble, France	Challenger	Hard (i)	(Israel) Harel Levy	(South Africa) Rik De Voest (Sweden) Johan Landsberg	5–7, 6–4, 7–6^{(7–5)}
Win	8–6	Jun 2005	Ljubljana, Slovenia	Challenger	Clay	(Croatia) Lovro Zovko	(Australia) Andrew Derer (Australia) Joseph Sirianni	6–3, 6–3
Win	9–6	Aug 2006	Segovia, Spain	Challenger	Hard	(Australia) Chris Guccione	(Sweden) Johan Landsberg (Sweden) Filip Prpic	6–3, 7–6^{(7–2)}
Loss	9–7	Sep 2006	France F12, Bagnères-de-Bigorre	Futures	Hard	(Australia) Sam Groth	(Monaco) Thomas Oger (France) Nicolas Tourte	6–2, 3–6, 4–6

== Performance timelines ==
Key
W	F	SF	QF	#R	RR	Q#	DNQ	A	NH

(W) winner; (F) finalist; (SF) semifinalist; (QF) quarterfinalist; (#R) rounds 4, 3, 2, 1; (RR) round-robin stage; (Q#) qualification round; (DNQ) did not qualify; (A) absent; (NH) not held; (SR) strike rate (events won / competed); (W–L) win–loss record.

=== Singles ===
Tournament	2000	2001	2002	2003	2004	2005	2006	2007	S/R	W–L
Grand Slam tournaments
Australian Open	Q1	Q1	Q1	Q1	A	1R	A	Q3	0 / 1	0–1
French Open	A	A	A	Q3	A	A	A	A	0 / 0	0–0
Wimbledon	A	A	A	2R	A	Q1	A	A	0 / 1	1–1
US Open	A	A	A	Q2	Q1	A	A	A	0 / 0	0–0
Win–loss	0–0	0–0	0–0	1–1	0–0	0–1	0–0	0–0	0 / 2	1–2
Career Statistics
	2000	2001	2002	2003	2004	2005	2006	2007	Career	
Tournaments	1	0	0	2	2	2	0	1	8	
Titles / Finals	0 / 0	0 / 0	0 / 0	0 / 0	0 / 0	0 / 0	0 / 0	0 / 0	0 / 0	
Overall win–loss	0–1	0–0	0–0	1–2	1–2	0–2	0–0	0–1	2-8	
Year-end ranking	331	410	334	144	324	336	275	422	20%	

=== Doubles ===
Tournament	2001	2002	2003	2004	2005	2006	2007	S/R	W–L
Grand Slam tournaments
Australian Open	2R	1R	A	A	1R	3R	1R	0 / 5	3–5
French Open	A	A	A	A	A	A	A	0 / 0	0–0
Wimbledon	A	A	A	A	A	A	A	0 / 0	0–0
US Open	A	A	A	A	A	A	A	0 / 0	0–0
Win–loss	1–1	0–1	0–0	0–0	0–1	2–1	0–1	0 / 5	3–5
Career Statistics
	2001	2002	2003	2004	2005	2006	2007	Career	
Tournaments	2	1	1	0	2	1	1	8	
Titles / Finals	0 / 0	0 / 0	0 / 0	0 / 0	0 / 0	0 / 0	0 / 0	0 / 0	
Overall win–loss	2–2	0–1	0–1	0–0	0–2	2–1	0–1	4-8	
Year-end ranking	232	186	187	491	322	190	840	33%	

== Record against other players ==
=== Record against top 10 players ===
Paul Baccanello's record against players who have been ranked in the top 10, with those who are active in boldface. Only ATP Tour main draw and Davis Cup matches are considered:

Player	Record	Win %	Hard	Clay	Grass	Last match
Number 4 ranked players						
(Sweden) Robin Söderling	0–1	0%	0–1	–	–	Lost (1–6, 3–6) at 2004 Bangkok
Number 5 ranked players						
(Germany) Rainer Schüttler	0–1	0%	0–1	–	–	Lost (4–6, 3–6) at 2004 Beijing
Number 7 ranked players						
(Spain) Mardy Fish	0–1	0%	0–1	–	–	Lost (4–6, 6–7^{(4–7)}) at 2003 Stockholm
Number 9 ranked players						
(Switzerland) Marc Rosset	1–0	100%	1–0	–	–	Won (7–6^{(7–2)}, 1–6, 7–6^{(7–4)}) at 2004 Bangkok
**Total**	**1–3**	**25%**	**1–3** **(25%)**	**0–0** **( – )**	**0–0** **( – )**	

=== Record against players ranked No. 11–20 ===
Active players are in boldface.

- (France) Nicolas Escudé 0–1
- (Spain) **Feliciano López** 0–1
- (Croatia) **Ivo Karlović** 0–1
