= 2008 Thailand Open (tennis) =

- Date: 22–28 September
- Edition: 6th
- Category: International Series
- Draw: 32S / 16D
- Prize money: $576,000
- Surface: Hard / indoor

Champions

Singles
- (France) Jo-Wilfried Tsonga

Doubles
- (Czech Republic) Lukáš Dlouhý / (India) Leander Paes
← 2007 ·	Thailand Open	· 2009 →

The 2008 Thailand Open was a men's tennis tournament played on indoor hard courts. It was the 6th edition of the Thailand Open, and was part of the International Series of the 2008 ATP Tour. It took place at the Impact Arena in Bangkok, Thailand, from 22 September through 28 September 2008.

The singles field was led by ATP No. 3, Australian Open champion, French Open and US Open semifinalist, Indian Wells and Rome Masters winner Novak Djokovic, Australian Open runner-up Jo-Wilfried Tsonga, Miami Masters semifinalist, Båstad finalist Tomáš Berdych. Also lined up were French Open semifinalist Gaël Monfils, Australian Open quarterfinalist Jarkko Nieminen, Robin Söderling, Marat Safin and Jürgen Melzer.

== Finals ==
=== Singles ===
(France) Jo-Wilfried Tsonga defeated (Serbia) Novak Djokovic, 7–6^{(7–4)}, 6–4

- It was Jo-Wilfried Tsonga's 1st career title.

=== Doubles ===
(Czech Republic) Lukáš Dlouhý / (India) Leander Paes defeated (United States) Scott Lipsky / (United States) David Martin, 6–4, 7–6^{(7–4)}
