= 2005 Thailand Open (tennis) =

- Date: 26 September - 2 October
- Edition: 3rd
- Category: International Series
- Surface: Hard / indoor
- Location: Bangkok, Thailand
- Venue: Impact Arena

Champions

Singles
- (Switzerland) Roger Federer

Doubles
- (Australia) Paul Hanley / (India) Leander Paes
← 2004 ·	Thailand Open	· 2006 →

The 2005 Thailand Open was a tennis tournament played on indoor hard courts. It was the 3rd edition of the Thailand Open, and was part of the International Series of the 2005 ATP Tour. It took place at the Impact Arena in Bangkok, Thailand, from 26 September through 2 October 2005.

== Finals ==
=== Singles ===
(Switzerland) Roger Federer defeated (United Kingdom) Andy Murray, 6–3, 7–5

=== Doubles ===
(Australia) Paul Hanley / (India) Leander Paes defeated (Israel) Jonathan Erlich / (Israel) Andy Ram, 5–6^{(5–7)}, 6–1, 6–2
