= 2010 PTT Thailand Open =

- Date: September 27 – October 3
- Edition: 8th

Champions

Singles
- (Spain) Guillermo García-López

Doubles
- (Germany) Christopher Kas / (Serbia) Viktor Troicki
← 2009 ·	PTT Thailand Open	· 2011 →

The 2010 PTT Thailand Open was a tennis tournament played on indoor hard courts. It was the 8th edition of the Thailand Open, and was part of the ATP World Tour 250 Series of the 2010 ATP World Tour. It took place at the Impact Arena in Bangkok, Thailand, from September 27 through October 3, 2010.

== Entrants ==
=== Seeds ===
Country	Player	Rank^{1}	Seed
ESP	Rafael Nadal	1	1
ESP	Fernando Verdasco	8	2
AUT	Jürgen Melzer	13	3
LAT	Ernests Gulbis	25	4
ARG	Juan Martín del Potro	35	5
NED	Thiemo de Bakker	46	6
SRB	Viktor Troicki	47	7
GER	Michael Berrer	49	8

- Seeds are based on the rankings of September 20, 2010.

=== Other entrants ===
The following players received wildcards into the singles main draw:

- (Spain) Marc López
- (Thailand) Danai Udomchoke
- (Spain) Fernando Verdasco

The following player received a Special Exempt into the singles main draw:

- (Germany) Mischa Zverev

The following players received entry from the qualifying draw:

- (Belgium) Ruben Bemelmans
- (United States) Ryler DeHeart
- (Russia) Konstantin Kravchuk
- (Denmark) Frederik Nielsen

== Finals ==
=== Singles ===
(Spain) Guillermo García-López defeated (Finland) Jarkko Nieminen, 6–4, 3–6, 6–4.

- It was García-López' first title of the year, and the second of his career.

=== Doubles ===
(Germany) Christopher Kas / (Serbia) Viktor Troicki defeated (Israel) Jonathan Erlich / (Austria) Jürgen Melzer, 6–4, 6–4.
