= Andrew Kratzmann =

Australian tennis player

- Country (sports): Australia
- Born: 3 November 1971 (age 55) Murgon, Queensland, Australia
- Height: 6 ft 4 in (1.93 m)
- Turned pro: 1990
- Retired: 2004
- Plays: Right-handed
- Prize money: $976,085

Singles
- Career record: 0–2
- Career titles: 0; 0 Challenger, 0 Futures
- Highest ranking: No. 299 (26 August 1991)

Grand Slam singles results
- Australian Open: 1R (1994)
- Wimbledon: Q2 (1991, 1993)

Doubles
- Career record: 198–210
- Career titles: 9; 8 Challenger, 0 Futures
- Highest ranking: No. 13 (13 March 2000)

Grand Slam doubles results
- Australian Open: F (2000)
- French Open: QF (1999)
- Wimbledon: QF (2000)
- US Open: 3R (1998, 2002)

Grand Slam mixed doubles results
- Australian Open: QF (1998)
- French Open: QF (1998)
- Wimbledon: 3R (1999, 2000, 2002)
- US Open: 2R (1993)

Andrew Kratzmann (born 3 November 1971) is a former professional male tennis player from Australia.

Kratzmann turned professional in 1990 and was known as a doubles specialist, often partnering with his brother Mark. He won nine ATP doubles titles during his career and reached a highest doubles ranking of world No. 13 in March 2000.

Kratzmann partnered Wayne Black to reach the doubles final of the 2000 Australian Open which they lost 16–18 in the fifth set to Ellis Ferreira and Rick Leach.

He teamed up with Roger Federer in the doubles at Wimbledon in 2000. They got to the quarter-finals before losing to Paul Haarhuis and Sandon Stolle. They also played together at the US Open in 2000 but were knocked out by Wayne Arthurs and Nenad Zimonjić.

After his playing career he became a tennis coach.

== Grand Slam finals ==
=== Doubles: 1 (1 runner-up) ===
Result	Year	Championship	Surface	Partner	Opponents	Score
Loss	2000	Australian Open	Hard	(Zimbabwe) Wayne Black	(South Africa) Ellis Ferreira (United States) Rick Leach	4–6, 6–3, 3–6, 6–3, 16–18

== ATP career finals ==
=== Doubles: 21 (9 titles, 12 runners-up) ===
Legend Grand Slam tournaments (0–1) ATP World Tour Finals (0–0) ATP Masters Series (1–0) ATP Championship Series(0–1) ATP World Series (8–10)	Finals by surface Hard (1–3) Clay (8–7) Grass (0–1) Carpet (0–1)	Finals by setting Outdoor (9–10) Indoor (0–2)

Result	W–L	Date	Tournament	Tier	Surface	Partner	Opponents	Score
Win	1–0	Jan 1994	Adelaide, Australia	World Series	Hard	(Australia) Mark Kratzmann	(South Africa) David Adams (Zimbabwe) Byron Black	6–4, 6–3
Loss	1–1	Jul 1995	Båstad, Sweden	World Series	Clay	(Australia) Jon Ireland	(Sweden) Jan Apell (Sweden) Jonas Björkman	3–6, 0–6
Win	2–1	Aug 1995	San Marino, San Marino	World Series	Clay	(Spain) Jordi Arrese	(Argentina) Pablo Albano (Italy) Federico Mordegan	7–6, 3–6, 6–2
Loss	2–2	Mar 1996	Copenhagen, Denmark	World Series	Carpet	(Australia) Wayne Arthurs	(Belgium) Libor Pimek (South Africa) Byron Talbot	6–7, 6–3, 3–6
Win	3–2	Sep 1996	Palermo, Italy	World Series	Clay	(South Africa) Marcos Ondruska	(Italy) Cristian Brandi (Spain) Emilio Sánchez	7–6, 6–4
Win	4–2	Oct 1996	Marbella, Spain	World Series	Clay	(United States) Jack Waite	(Argentina) Pablo Albano (Argentina) Lucas Arnold Ker	6–7, 6–3, 6–4
Loss	4–3	Aug 1997	Amsterdam, Netherlands	World Series	Clay	(Belgium) Libor Pimek	(Australia) Paul Kilderry (Ecuador) Nicolás Lapentti	6–3, 5–7, 6–7
Win	5–3	Oct 1997	Palermo, Italy	World Series	Clay	(Belgium) Libor Pimek	(Netherlands) Hendrik Jan Davids (Argentina) Daniel Orsanic	3–6, 6–3, 7–6
Win	6–3	Nov 1997	Santiago, Chile	World Series	Clay	(Netherlands) Hendrik Jan Davids	(Spain) Julian Alonso (Ecuador) Nicolás Lapentti	7–6, 5–7, 6–4
Win	7–3	May 1998	Prague, Czech Republic	World Series	Clay	(Australia) Wayne Arthurs	(Sweden) Fredrik Bergh (Sweden) Nicklas Kulti	6–1, 6–1
Loss	7–4	Aug 1998	Kitzbühel, Austria	World Series	Clay	(Australia) Joshua Eagle	(Netherlands) Tom Kempers (Argentina) Daniel Orsanic	3–6, 4–6
Win	8–4	May 1999	Hamburg, Germany	Masters Series	Clay	(Australia) Wayne Arthurs	(Netherlands) Paul Haarhuis (United States) Jared Palmer	2–6, 7–6, 6–2
Loss	8–5	Jan 2000	Melbourne, Australia	Grand Slam	Hard	(Zimbabwe) Wayne Black	(South Africa) Ellis Ferreira (United States) Rick Leach	4–6, 6–3, 3–6, 6–3, 16–18
Win	9–5	May 2000	St. Pölten, Austria	World Series	Clay	(India) Mahesh Bhupathi	(Italy) Andrea Gaudenzi (Italy) Diego Nargiso	7–6^{(12–10)}, 6–7^{(2–7)}, 6–4
Loss	9–6	Jun 2001	Nottingham, United Kingdom	World Series	Grass	(Australia) Paul Hanley	(United States) Donald Johnson (United States) Jared Palmer	4–6, 2–6
Loss	9–7	Jul 2001	Båstad, Sweden	World Series	Clay	(Sweden) Simon Aspelin	(Germany) Karsten Braasch (Germany) Jens Knippschild	6–7^{(3–7)}, 6–4, 6–7^{(5–7)}
Loss	9–8	Jul 2001	Kitzbühel, Austria	Championship Series	Clay	(Sweden) Simon Aspelin	(Spain) Àlex Corretja (Argentina) Luis Lobo	1–6, 4–6
Loss	9–9	Feb 2002	Buenos Aires, Argentina	World Series	Clay	(Sweden) Simon Aspelin	(Argentina) Gastón Etlis (Argentina) Martín Rodríguez	6–3, 3–6, [4–10]
Loss	9–10	Apr 2002	Estoril, Portugal	World Series	Clay	(Sweden) Simon Aspelin	(Germany) Karsten Braasch (Russia) Andrei Olhovskiy	3–6, 3–6
Loss	9–11	Sep 2002	Hong Kong, Hong Kong	World Series	Hard	(Australia) Wayne Arthurs	(United States) Jan-Michael Gambill (United States) Graydon Oliver	7–6^{(7–2)}, 4–6, 6–7^{(4–7)}
Loss	9–12	Sep 2003	Bangkok, Thailand	World Series	Hard	(Finland) Jarkko Nieminen	(Israel) Jonathan Erlich (Israel) Andy Ram	3–6, 6–7^{(4–7)}

== ATP Challenger and ITF Futures finals ==
=== Singles: 1 (0–1) ===
Legend ATP Challenger (0–1) ITF Futures (0–0)	Finals by surface Hard (0–0) Clay (0–0) Grass (0–0) Carpet (0–1)

Result	W–L	Date	Tournament	Tier	Surface	Opponent	Score
Loss	0–1	Sep 1990	Canberra, Australia	Challenger	Carpet	(New Zealand) Brett Steven	3–6, 4–6

=== Doubles: 14 (8–6) ===
Legend ATP Challenger (8–6) ITF Futures (0–0)	Finals by surface Hard (1–4) Clay (5–2) Grass (1–0) Carpet (1–0)

Result	W–L	Date	Tournament	Tier	Surface	Partner	Opponents	Score
Win	1–0	Nov 1991	Hobart, Australia	Challenger	Carpet	(Australia) Michael Brown	(Australia) Bret Richardson (Australia) Simon Youl	3–6, 6–3, 7–6
Loss	1–1	May 1992	Taipei, Taiwan	Challenger	Hard	(Australia) Neil Borwick	(Australia) Broderick Dyke (Sweden) Peter Lundgren	6–7, 5–7
Win	2–1	Jul 1992	Salerno, Italy	Challenger	Clay	(Australia) Roger Rasheed	(Argentina) Gabriel Markus (Argentina) Daniel Orsanic	6–4, 6–3
Win	3–1	Aug 1992	Winnetka, United States	Challenger	Hard	(Australia) Roger Rasheed	(United States) Rick Witsken (United States) Todd Witsken	6–3, 3–6, 6–3
Win	4–1	Aug 1992	Fortaleza, Brazil	Challenger	Clay	(Australia) Roger Rasheed	(Sweden) Christer Allgardh (Venezuela) Maurice Ruah	7–6, 6–4
Loss	4–2	May 1993	Bochum, Germany	Challenger	Clay	(Australia) Jon Ireland	(Sweden) Mårten Renström (Netherlands) Joost Winnink	3–6, 6–2, 5–7
Win	5–2	Jun 1993	Turin, Italy	Challenger	Clay	(Sweden) Mårten Renström	(United States) Brian Joelson (United States) John Sullivan	6–4, 6–0
Loss	5–3	Apr 1995	Nagoya, Japan	Challenger	Hard	(Australia) Joshua Eagle	(South Africa) Kevin Ullyett (India) Leander Paes	6–7, 5–7
Win	6–3	Jun 1995	Furth, Germany	Challenger	Clay	(Australia) Brent Larkham	(United States) Ken Flach (United States) Kent Kinnear	6–4, 6–7, 7–6
Loss	6–4	Dec 1995	Perth, Australia	Challenger	Hard	(Australia) Wayne Arthurs	(Australia) Joshua Eagle (Australia) Andrew Florent	4–6, 4–6
Loss	6–5	Dec 1996	Perth, Australia	Challenger	Hard	(Australia) Grant Doyle	(Australia) James Holmes (Australia) Andrew Painter	5–7, 4–6
Win	7–5	May 1997	Košice, Slovakia	Challenger	Clay	(Australia) Pat Cash	(South Africa) Brent Haygarth (Belarus) Max Mirnyi	4–6, 6–2, 6–4
Loss	7–6	Apr 2003	Paget, Bermuda	Challenger	Clay	(Australia) Ashley Fisher	(United States) Robert Kendrick (The Bahamas) Mark Merklein	3–6, 1–3 ret.
Win	8–6	Jun 2003	Surbiton, United Kingdom	Challenger	Grass	(Australia) Joshua Eagle	(France) Jean-François Bachelot (France) Gregory Carraz	6–3, 6–2

== Performance timelines ==
Key
W	F	SF	QF	#R	RR	Q#	DNQ	A	NH

(W) winner; (F) finalist; (SF) semifinalist; (QF) quarterfinalist; (#R) rounds 4, 3, 2, 1; (RR) round-robin stage; (Q#) qualification round; (DNQ) did not qualify; (A) absent; (NH) not held; (SR) strike rate (events won / competed); (W–L) win–loss record.

=== Singles ===
Tournament	1989	1990	1991	1992	1993	1994	1995	1996	SR	W–L	Win %
Grand Slam tournaments
Australian Open	Q1	Q1	Q1	Q2	Q1	1R	Q2	Q2	0 / 1	0–1	0%
French Open	A	A	A	A	A	A	A	A	0 / 0	0–0	–
Wimbledon	A	A	Q2	A	Q2	A	A	A	0 / 0	0–0	–
US Open	A	A	A	A	A	A	A	A	0 / 0	0–0	–
Win–loss	0–0	0–0	0–0	0–0	0–0	0–1	0–0	0–0	0 / 1	0–1	0%
ATP Tour Masters 1000
Canada Masters	A	A	A	A	Q2	Q1	A	A	0 / 0	0–0	–
Win–loss	0–0	0–0	0–0	0–0	0–0	0–0	0–0	0–0	0 / 0	0–0	–

=== Doubles ===
Tournament	1991	1992	1993	1994	1995	1996	1997	1998	1999	2000	2001	2002	2003	SR	W–L	Win %
Grand Slam tournaments
Australian Open	1R	A	1R	3R	2R	1R	1R	2R	2R	F	1R	2R	1R	0 / 12	11–12	48%
French Open	A	A	A	2R	A	A	2R	1R	QF	2R	1R	1R	1R	0 / 8	6–8	43%
Wimbledon	1R	A	1R	1R	1R	1R	1R	2R	2R	QF	2R	3R	1R	0 / 12	8–12	40%
US Open	A	1R	A	1R	1R	A	1R	1R	3R	2R	1R	3R	1R	0 / 10	5–10	33%
Win–loss	0–2	0–1	0–2	3–4	1–3	0–2	1–4	2–4	7–4	10–4	1–4	5–4	0–4	0 / 42	30–42	42%
ATP Masters Series
Indian Wells	A	A	A	A	A	A	Q1	A	Q1	2R	Q2	1R	A	0 / 2	1–2	33%
Miami	A	A	A	A	A	A	2R	1R	A	2R	1R	A	A	0 / 4	1–4	20%
Monte-Carlo	A	A	A	A	A	A	A	A	SF	A	1R	1R	A	0 / 3	3–3	50%
Hamburg	A	A	A	A	A	A	A	2R	W	1R	QF	1R	A	1 / 5	8–4	67%
Rome	A	A	A	A	A	A	A	QF	1R	1R	1R	A	A	0 / 4	2–4	33%
Canada	A	A	1R	A	A	A	A	1R	A	1R	QF	1R	A	0 / 5	2–5	29%
Cincinnati	A	A	A	Q2	A	A	A	1R	1R	QF	2R	1R	A	0 / 5	3–5	38%
Stuttgart^{1}	A	A	A	A	A	A	A	A	QF	A	A	A	A	0 / 1	2–1	67%
Paris	A	A	A	A	A	A	A	Q1	QF	A	A	A	A	0 / 1	2–1	67%
Win–loss	0–0	0–0	0–1	0–0	0–0	0–0	1–1	3–5	12–5	3–6	5–6	0–5	0–0	1 / 30	24–29	44%

=== Mixed doubles ===
Tournament	1991	1992	1993	1994	1995	1996	1997	1998	1999	2000	2001	2002	2003	2004	SR	W–L	Win %
Grand Slam tournaments
Australian Open	A	A	A	A	A	A	1R	QF	A	1R	1R	1R	A	1R	0 / 6	2–6	25%
French Open	A	A	QF	2R	A	A	2R	2R	1R	2R	A	A	A	A	0 / 6	5–6	45%
Wimbledon	1R	A	A	A	1R	1R	1R	2R	3R	3R	2R	3R	2R	A	0 / 10	9–10	47%
US Open	A	A	A	A	A	A	A	2R	1R	1R	A	1R	A	A	0 / 4	1–4	20%
Win–loss	0–1	0–0	2–1	1–1	0–1	0–1	1–3	5–4	2–3	2–4	1–2	2–3	1–1	0–1	0 / 26	17–26	40%
