= 2007 Thailand Open (tennis) =

- Date: September 24–30
- Edition: 5th

Champions

Singles
- (Russia) Dmitry Tursunov

Doubles
- (Thailand) Sanchai Ratiwatana / (Thailand) Sonchat Ratiwatana
← 2006 ·	Thailand Open	· 2008 →

The 2007 Thailand Open was a tennis tournament played on indoor hard courts. It was the 5th edition of the Thailand Open, and was part of the International Series of the 2007 ATP Tour. It took place at the Impact Arena in Bangkok, Thailand, from September 24 through September 30, 2007.

The singles field featured ATP No. 3, French Open and Wimbledon semifinalist, US Open runner-up, Adelaide, Estoril, Miami Masters and Canada Masters champion Novak Djokovic, Australian Open semifinalist, Queen's Club and Washington titlist Andy Roddick, and Halle winner Tomáš Berdych. Also lined up were Memphis champion Tommy Haas, Umag winner Carlos Moyá, Dmitry Tursunov, Ivo Karlović and Fernando Verdasco.

== Finals ==
=== Singles ===
(Russia) Dmitry Tursunov defeated (Germany) Benjamin Becker, 6–2, 6–1

- It was Dmitry Tursunov's 2nd title of the year, and his 3rd overall.

=== Doubles ===
(Thailand) Sanchai Ratiwatana / (Thailand) Sonchat Ratiwatana defeated (France) Michaël Llodra / (France) Nicolas Mahut, 3–6, 7–5, [10–7]
