= Nicolas Thomann =

French tennis player

- Country (sports): France
- Born: 29 November 1972 (age 52); Mulhouse, France
- Height: 1.83 m (6 ft 0 in)
- Turned pro: 1996
- Retired: 2006
- Plays: Right-handed
- Prize money: $437,629

Singles
- Career record: 14–25
- Career titles: 0
- Highest ranking: No. 106 (11 August 2003)

Grand Slam singles results
- Australian Open: 1R (2002)
- French Open: 1R (2001)
- Wimbledon: 2R (2002)

Doubles
- Career record: 1–2
- Career titles: 0
- Highest ranking: No. 398 (18 July 2005)

Grand Slam doubles results
- French Open: 1R (2001)

Nicolas Thomann (French pronunciation: [nikɔla tɔman]; born 29 November 1972) is a former professional tennis player from France.

== Career ==
Thomann was a quarter-finalist in the 2000 Davidoff Swiss Indoors, beating top 50 players Nicolas Escudé and Nicolás Lapentti en route. His best win however came in Atlanta the following year, where he had a straight sets upset win over Andre Agassi in the opening round, playing as a qualifier. The American had gone into the tournament having won his previous two tournaments, both ATP Masters Series events.

In the 2001 French Open he competed in both the singles and men's doubles. He lost his singles match in five sets to Jan Frode Andersen and also exited in the first round of the doubles, partnering Jérôme Golmard.

The Frenchman lost to Thomas Enqvist in the opening round of 2002 Australian Open but reached the second round in the 2002 Wimbledon Championships, with a win against Markus Hipfl, won 11–9 in the fifth set. He was then eliminated by Yevgeny Kafelnikov.

He reached the semi-finals at the 2003 RCA Championships, held in Indianapolis and also made the quarter-finals of the Thailand Open that year.

== Challenger titles ==
=== Singles: (2) ===
No.	Year	Tournament	Surface	Opponent	Score
1.	2000	Geneva, Switzerland	Clay	(Spain) Álex Calatrava	6–4, 6–7^{(2)}, 6–1
2.	2002	Oberstaufen, Germany	Clay	(Czech Republic) Tomáš Zíb	7–6^{(6)}, 6–4

=== Doubles: (1) ===
No.	Year	Tournament	Surface	Partner	Opponents	Score
1.	2005	Andrezieux, France	Hard	(Germany) Alexander Waske	(Sweden) Robert Lindstedt (Switzerland) Jean-Claude Scherrer	7–6^{(2)}, 7–6^{(4)}
