= Guillermo García López =

Spanish tennis player (born 1983)

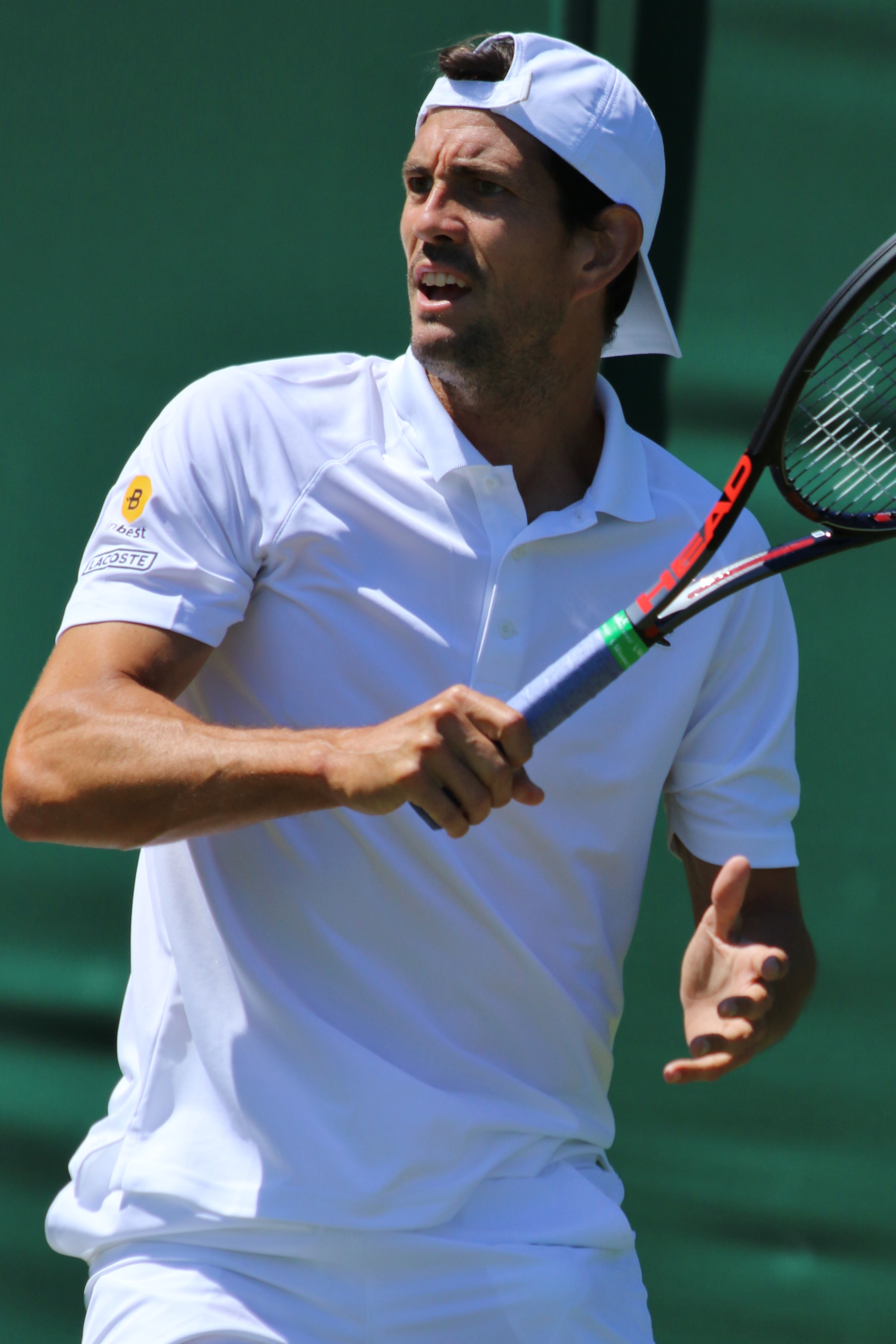
- García López at the 2018 Wimbledon Championships
- Country (sports): Spain
- Residence: La Roda, Spain
- Born: 4 June 1983 (age 42) La Roda, Spain
- Height: 1.88 m (6 ft 2 in)
- Turned pro: 2002
- Retired: 2021
- Plays: Right-handed (one-handed backhand)
- Coach: José Luis Aparisi
- Prize money: $8,451,851

Singles
- Career record: 297–354
- Career titles: 5
- Highest ranking: No. 23 (21 February 2011)

Grand Slam singles results
- Australian Open: 4R (2015)
- French Open: 4R (2014)
- Wimbledon: 3R (2008)
- US Open: 3R (2015)

Doubles
- Career record: 118–171
- Career titles: 3
- Highest ranking: No. 27 (15 May 2017)

Grand Slam doubles results
- Australian Open: SF (2017)
- French Open: 2R (2007, 2009, 2014, 2018)
- Wimbledon: 2R (2015)
- US Open: F (2016)
Medal record
Mediterranean Games
Silver medal – second place	2005 Almería	Singles
Gold medal – first place	2005 Almería	Doubles
- Last updated on: 25 August 2021.

Guillermo García López (Spanish pronunciation: [ɡiˈʎeɾmo ɣaɾˈθi.a ˈlopeθ], (Note: In isolation, García is pronounced [ɡaɾˈθi.a].) born 4 June 1983) is a Spanish tennis coach and a former professional player. He won five singles titles and achieved a career-high singles ranking of world No. 23 in February 2011.

As of 2021, he collected thirteen wins over top-10 players, including world No. 1 Rafael Nadal in 2010, world No. 4 Andy Murray in 2012 and world No. 3 Stan Wawrinka in 2014.

== Personal life ==
He is named after the famed tennis player Guillermo Vilas – who his father admired greatly for his clay court dominance. He is good friends with fellow Spanish tennis player Juan Carlos Ferrero, and both train at the JC Ferrero Equelite Sport Academy in Villena, Spain.

== Professional career ==
On 23 November 2009, García López achieved his then career-high singles ranking of World No. 41 after winning his first round at Austrian Open. During the 2009 year, he beat 11th seed Fernando Verdasco in the first round of the 2009 Western & Southern Financial Group Masters and Women's Open, also beating Mikhail Youzhny in the second round. He fell to Julien Benneteau in the third round.

At the 2010 BNP Paribas Open, he upset World No. 9 Marin Čilić in the second round. García López continued his good form into the next round by defeating 26th seed Thomaz Bellucci after losing the first set. However, he lost to Juan Mónaco in the fourth round.

At the 2010 Aegon International in Eastbourne, he reached the final, but lost to Michaël Llodra.

In the semifinals of the 2010 PTT Thailand Open, he recorded arguably the biggest win of his career, defeating World No. 1 Rafael Nadal, saving 24 of 26 break points, while converting his only opportunity to break Nadal. He then went on to take his second title (his first on hard court) with a victory over Jarkko Nieminen.

He continued his form in the 2010 Rakuten Japan Open Tennis Championships in Tokyo. He stretched his winning streak to seven by beating Rajeev Ram and Feliciano López, before falling to Viktor Troicki in the quarterfinals.

Going into the 2010 Shanghai Rolex Masters 1000, he managed to battle fatigue with his newfound confidence, beating Eduardo Schwank, tenth seed Andy Roddick (who retired due to injury in the second set), and stunning seventh seed (and World No. 7) Tomáš Berdych to reach the quarterfinals. There, he went down against second seed and World No. 2 Novak Djokovic.

In 2012, he upset World No. 4 Andy Murray at Indian Wells in the second round. Garcia Lopez also defeated fourth-seeded Pablo Andújar to enter the quarterfinals of the Mercedes Cup.

In January 2021, Garcia Lopez announced that he would retire after the 2021 season.

== Coaching career ==
Garcia Lopez is currently coaching Vilius Gaubas since 2020.

== Grand Slam finals ==
=== Doubles: 1 (1 runner-up) ===
Result	Year	Championship	Surface	Partner	Opponents	Score
Loss	2016	US Open	Hard	(Spain) Pablo Carreño Busta	(United Kingdom) Jamie Murray (Brazil) Bruno Soares	2–6, 3–6

== ATP career finals ==
=== Singles: 9 (5 titles, 4 runners-up) ===
Legend Grand Slam tournaments (0–0) ATP World Tour Finals (0–0) ATP World Tour Masters 1000 (0–0) ATP World Tour 500 Series (0–0) ATP World Tour 250 Series (5–4)	Titles by surface Hard (2–2) Clay (3–1) Grass (0–1)	Titles by setting Outdoor (3–3) Indoor (2–1)

Result	W–L	Date	Tournament	Tier	Surface	Opponent	Score
Win	1–0	May 2009	Austrian Open, Austria	250 Series	Clay	(France) Julien Benneteau	3–6, 7–6^{(7–1)}, 6–3
Loss	1–1	Jun 2010	Eastbourne International, United Kingdom	250 Series	Grass	(France) Michaël Llodra	5–7, 2–6
Win	2–1	Oct 2010	Thailand Open, Thailand	250 Series	Hard (i)	(Finland) Jarkko Nieminen	6–4, 3–6, 6–4
Loss	2–2	Apr 2013	Romanian Open, Romania	250 Series	Clay	(Czech Republic) Lukáš Rosol	3–6, 2–6
Loss	2–3	Sep 2013	St. Petersburg Open, Russia	250 Series	Hard (i)	(Latvia) Ernests Gulbis	6–3, 4–6, 0–6
Win	3–3	Apr 2014	Grand Prix Hassan II, Morocco	250 Series	Clay	(Spain) Marcel Granollers	5–7, 6–4, 6–3
Win	4–3	Feb 2015	Zagreb Indoors, Croatia	250 Series	Hard (i)	(Italy) Andreas Seppi	7–6^{(7–4)}, 6–3
Win	5–3	Apr 2015	Romanian Open, Romania	250 Series	Clay	(Czech Republic) Jiří Veselý	7–6^{(7–5)}, 7–6^{(13–11)}
Loss	5–4	Oct 2015	Shenzhen Open, China	250 Series	Hard	(Czech Republic) Tomáš Berdych	3–6, 6–7^{(7–9)}

=== Doubles: 9 (3 titles, 6 runners-up) ===
Legend Grand Slam tournaments (0–1) ATP World Tour Finals (0–0) ATP World Tour Masters 1000 (0–0) ATP World Tour 500 Series (0–1) ATP World Tour 250 Series (3–4)	Titles by surface Hard (2–2) Clay (1–4) Grass (0–0)	Titles by setting Outdoor (2–5) Indoor (1–1)

Result	W–L	Date	Tournament	Tier	Surface	Partner	Opponents	Score
Loss	0–1	Jul 2006	Croatia Open, Croatia	International	Clay	(Spain) Albert Portas	(Czech Republic) Jaroslav Levinský (Czech Republic) David Škoch	4–6, 4–6
Loss	0–2	Jul 2007	Stuttgart Open, Germany	Intl. Gold	Clay	(Spain) Fernando Verdasco	(Czech Republic) František Čermák (Czech Republic) Leoš Friedl	4–6, 4–6
Loss	0–3	Oct 2009	Thailand Open, Thailand	250 Series	Hard (i)	(Germany) Mischa Zverev	(United States) Eric Butorac (United States) Rajeev Ram	6–7^{(4–7)}, 3–6
Win	1–3	Jan 2010	Qatar Open, Qatar	250 Series	Hard	(Spain) Albert Montañés	(Czech Republic) František Čermák (Slovakia) Michal Mertiňák	6–4, 7–5
Loss	1–4	Jul 2013	Swiss Open, Switzerland	250 Series	Clay	(Spain) Pablo Andújar	(United Kingdom) Jamie Murray (Australia) John Peers	3–6, 4–6
Win	2–4	Mar 2014	Brasil Open, Brazil	250 Series	Clay (i)	(Austria) Philipp Oswald	(Colombia) Juan Sebastián Cabal (Colombia) Robert Farah	5–7, 6–4, [15–13]
Loss	2–5	Jul 2014	Stuttgart Open, Germany	250 Series	Clay	(Austria) Philipp Oswald	(Poland) Mateusz Kowalczyk (New Zealand) Artem Sitak	6–2, 1–6, [7–10]
Win	3–5	Aug 2016	Winston-Salem Open, United States	250 Series	Hard	(Finland) Henri Kontinen	(Germany) Andre Begemann (India) Leander Paes	4–6, 7–6^{(8–6)}, [10–8]
Loss	3–6	Sep 2016	US Open, United States	Grand Slam	Hard	(Spain) Pablo Carreño Busta	(United Kingdom) Jamie Murray (Brazil) Bruno Soares	2–6, 3–6

== Challenger and Futures Finals ==
=== Singles: 18 (6-12) ===
Legend (singles) ATP Challenger Tour (4-7) ITF Futures Tour (2-5)	Titles by surface Hard (3-3) Clay (3-9) Grass (0–0) Carpet (0–0)

Result	W–L	Date	Tournament	Tier	Surface	Opponent	Score
Loss	0–1	Jun 2002	Spain F4, Canary Islands, Spain	Futures	Hard	(Greece) Nikos Rovas	7–5, 4–6, 4–6
Loss	0–2	Sep 2002	Spain F16, Madrid	Futures	Hard	(Spain) Rafael Nadal	3–6, 6–7^{(1–7)}
Loss	0–3	Mar 2003	Portugal F5, Faro	Futures	Hard	(Greece) Konstantinos Economidis	4-6, 1-6
Win	1-3	Apr 2003	Spain F5, Castellon	Futures	Clay	(Spain) Gorka Fraile	6-0, 6-3
Loss	1-4	Jul 2003	Spain F13, Alicante	Futures	Clay	(Spain) Nicolás Almagro	3–6, 4–6
Loss	1-5	Jul 2003	Spain F14, Elche	Futures	Clay	(Spain) Miguel Ángel López Jaén	4–6, 5–7
Loss	1-6	Oct 2003	Seville, Spain	Challenger	Clay	(Peru) Luis Horna	0–6, 6–4, 3–6
Win	2-6	Mar 2004	Portugal F1, Faro	Futures	Hard	(Germany) Philipp Petzschner	6-3, 6-2
Loss	2-7	May 2004	Rome, Italy	Challenger	Clay	(France) Nicolas Coutelot	7–5, 5–7, 2–6
Loss	2-8	Jun 2006	Lugano, Switzerland	Challenger	Clay	(France) Olivier Patience	4-6, 1-6
Win	3-8	Jul 2006	Scheveningen, Netherlands	Challenger	Clay	(Spain) Albert Montañés	0–6, 6–3, 6–4
Win	4-8	Nov 2007	Tunis, Tunisia	Challenger	Hard	(Switzerland) Michael Lammer	6–4, 7–6^{(7–3)}
Loss	4-9	Apr 2013	Rome, Italy	Challenger	Clay	(Germany) Julian Reister	6–4, 3–6, 2–6
Win	5-9	Jul 2017	Scheveningen, Netherlands	Challenger	Clay	(Belgium) Ruben Bemelmans	6–1, 6–7^{(3–7)}, 6–2
Loss	5-10	Aug 2017	Manerbio, Italy	Challenger	Clay	(Spain) Roberto Carballés Baena	4–6, 6–2, 2–6
Loss	5-11	Sep 2017	Genova, Italy	Challenger	Clay	(Greece) Stefanos Tsitsipas	5–7, 6–7^{(2–7)}
Win	6-11	Oct 2017	Tashkent, Uzbekistan	Challenger	Hard	(Poland) Kamil Majchrzak	6–1, 7–6^{(7–1)}
Loss	6-12	Jul 2019	Perugia, Italy	Challenger	Clay	(Argentina) Federico Delbonis	0–6, 6–1, 6–7^{(5–7)}

== Performance timelines ==
Key
W	F	SF	QF	#R	RR	Q#	DNQ	A	NH

(W) winner; (F) finalist; (SF) semifinalist; (QF) quarterfinalist; (#R) rounds 4, 3, 2, 1; (RR) round-robin stage; (Q#) qualification round; (DNQ) did not qualify; (A) absent; (NH) not held; (SR) strike rate (events won / competed); (W–L) win–loss record.
To avoid confusion and double counting, these charts are updated at the conclusion of a tournament or when the player's participation has ended.

=== Singles ===
Tournament	2004	2005	2006	2007	2008	2009	2010	2011	2012	2013	2014	2015	2016	2017	2018	2019	2020	2021	W–L
Grand Slam tournaments
Australian Open	A	2R	2R	2R	3R	2R	1R	3R	1R	1R	2R	4R	3R	1R	2R	1R	Q1	Q1	15–15
French Open	2R	1R	1R	2R	2R	1R	2R	3R	1R	1R	4R	1R	2R	3R	2R	1R	Q1	A	13–16
Wimbledon	A	2R	2R	1R	3R	2R	1R	2R	2R	1R	1R	1R	1R	A	2R	Q2	NH	A	8–13
US Open	A	1R	1R	1R	2R	2R	2R	2R	2R	1R	2R	3R	1R	A	A	1R	A	A	8–13
Win–loss	1–1	2–4	2–4	2–4	6–4	3–4	2–4	6–4	2–4	0–4	5–4	5–4	3–4	2–2	3–3	0–3	0–0	0–0	44–57
ATP Masters 1000
Indian Wells Masters	A	A	A	3R	2R	1R	4R	2R	3R	A	A	2R	2R	1R	A	A	NH	A	9–9
Miami Open	A	A	A	2R	1R	1R	2R	2R	2R	A	3R	3R	2R	A	2R	A	NH	A	7–10
Monte-Carlo Masters	A	1R	A	3R	Q2	A	1R	2R	A	A	QF	A	2R	1R	2R	A	NH	A	6–8
Madrid Open	A	Q2	A	Q1	Q1	1R	3R	3R	2R	1R	2R	1R	1R	1R	1R	A	NH	A	6–10
Italian Open	A	A	A	A	A	Q1	3R	1R	2R	A	A	3R	2R	A	Q2	A	A	A	6–5
Canadian Open	A	A	A	A	A	1R	A	A	A	A	1R	A	A	A	A	A	NH	A	0–2
Cincinnati Masters	A	Q2	A	Q1	A	3R	A	1R	A	A	1R	A	A	A	2R	A	A	A	2–4
Shanghai Masters	Not Masters Series					1R	QF	2R	Q2	A	1R	1R	1R	A	A	A	NH	A	4–6
Paris Masters	A	Q1	A	Q1	Q1	A	A	2R	1R	Q1	1R	1R	A	Q2	A	A	A	A	1–4
German Open	A	Q2	2R	1R	A	Not Masters Series													1–2
Win–loss	0–0	0–1	1–1	4–4	1–2	2–6	11–6	5–8	5–5	0–1	6–7	3–6	3–6	0–3	1–4	0–0	0–0	0–0	42–60
Career statistics
Titles–Finals	0–0	0–0	0–0	0–0	0–0	1–1	1–2	0–0	0–0	0–2	1–1	2–3	0–0	0–0	0–0	0–0	0–0	0–0	5–9
Year End Ranking	129	91	68	90	62	41	33	39	76	62	36	27	70	70	105	144	220	461	

=== Doubles ===
Tournament	2004	2005	2006	2007	2008	2009	2010	2011	2012	2013	2014	2015	2016	2017	2018	2019	2020	2021	W–L
Grand Slam tournaments
Australian Open	1R	A	A	1R	1R	1R	A	1R	2R	1R	3R	2R	1R	SF	3R	3R	A	A	12–13
French Open	A	A	A	2R	A	2R	1R	1R	1R	1R	2R	3R	1R	1R (Note: García López and Carreño Busta walkover before the first round, so it doesn't count as a loss)	2R	A	A	A	6–10
Wimbledon	A	A	A	1R	A	1R	1R	1R	1R	1R	1R	2R	1R	A	1R	A	NH	A	1–9
US Open	A	A	1R	A	1R	3R	1R	1R	2R	1R	3R	1R	F	A	A	A	A	A	10–10
Win–loss	0–1	0–0	0–1	1–3	0–2	3–4	0–3	0–4	2–4	0–4	5–4	4–4	5–4	4–1	3–3	2–1	0–0	0–0	29–43

== Wins over top 10 players ==
- He has a 13–49 record against players who were, at the time the match was played, ranked in the top 10.

Season	2002	2003	2004	2005	2006	2007	2008	2009	2010	2011	2012	2013	2014	2015	2016	2017	2018	2019	2020	2021	Total
Wins	0	0	0	1	1	0	0	1	4	0	1	1	2	1	0	0	1	0	0	0	13

#	Player	Rank	Event	Surface	Rd	Score
2005
1.	(Spain) Carlos Moyá	5	Australian Open, Melbourne, Australia	Hard	1R	7–5, 6–3, 3–6, 6–3
2006
2.	(United States) Andre Agassi	9	Delray Beach, United States	Hard	QF	6–4, 6–2
2009
3.	(Spain) Fernando Verdasco	10	Cincinnati, United States	Hard	1R	7–6^{(7–4)}, 7–6^{(7–4)}
2010
4.	(Croatia) Marin Čilić	9	Indian Wells, United States	Hard	2R	7–6^{(7–1)}, 6–0
5.	(France) Jo-Wilfried Tsonga	10	Madrid, Spain	Clay	2R	6–2, retired
6.	(Spain) Rafael Nadal	1	Bangkok, Thailand	Hard (i)	SF	2–6, 7–6^{(7–3)}, 6–3
7.	(Czech Republic) Tomáš Berdych	7	Shanghai, China	Hard	3R	7–6^{(7–4)}, 6–3
2012
8.	(United Kingdom) Andy Murray	4	Indian Wells, United States	Hard	2R	7–6^{(7–4)}, 6–3
2013
9.	(Serbia) Janko Tipsarević	10	Bucharest, Romania	Clay	QF	6–3, 3–6, 6–4
2014
10.	(Czech Republic) Tomáš Berdych	5	Monte Carlo, Monaco	Clay	3R	4–6, 6–3, 6–1
11.	(Switzerland) Stan Wawrinka	3	French Open, Paris, France	Clay	1R	6–4, 5–7, 6–2, 6–0
2015
12.	(Croatia) Marin Čilić	10	Rome, Italy	Clay	1R	6–4, 6–3
2018
13.	(Spain) Pablo Carreño Busta	10	Buenos Aires, Argentina	Clay	2R	7–6 ^{(7–5)}, 1–6, 7–6 ^{(8–6)}
