= Graydon Oliver =

American tennis player

- Country (sports): United States
- Residence: Tampa, Florida
- Born: June 15, 1978 (age 47) Miami, Florida, United States
- Height: 6 ft 4 in (1.93 m)
- Turned pro: 2001
- Retired: 2005
- Plays: Right-handed
- Prize money: $357,113

Singles
- Career record: 0–0
- Career titles: 0
- Highest ranking: No. 865 (March 31, 2003)

Doubles
- Career record: 80–84
- Career titles: 4
- Highest ranking: No. 29 (August 15, 2005)

Grand Slam doubles results
- Australian Open: 1R (2003, 2004, 2005)
- French Open: 1R (2003, 2004, 2005)
- Wimbledon: 3R (2002)
- US Open: 3R (2004, 2006)

Graydon Oliver (born June 15, 1978) is a former American professional tennis player. A doubles specialist, he won four titles during his career.

In 2004, Oliver served a two-month competition suspension for unintentional use of hydrochlorothiazide.

== Doubles finals ==
=== Wins (8) ===
Legend (singles)
Grand Slam (0)
Tennis Masters Cup (0)
ATP Masters Series (0)
ATP International Series Gold (0)
ATP Tour (4)
Challengers (4)

No.	Date	Tournament	Surface	Partner	Opponents	Score
1.	March 11, 2002	North Miami Beach, U.S.	Hard	(United States) Eric Nunez	(Czech Republic) Ota Fukárek (United States) Jim Thomas	3–6, 7–6^{5}, 7–5
2.	September 23, 2002	Hong Kong	Hard	(United States) Jan-Michael Gambill	(Australia) Wayne Arthurs (Australia) Andrew Kratzmann	^{2}6–7, 6–4, 7–6^{4}
3.	February 3, 2003	Joplin, U.S.	Hard (i)	(Argentina) Martín García	(United States) Diego Ayala (United States) Brandon Coupe	6–1, 6–4
4.	April 5, 2004	Calabasas, U.S.	Hard	(United States) Travis Parrott	(Slovakia) Ivo Klec (Sweden) Robert Lindstedt	7–5, 6–3
5.	September 13, 2004	Beijing, China	Hard (i)	(United States) Justin Gimelstob	(United States) Alex Bogomolov, Jr. (United States) Taylor Dent	4–6, 6–4, 7–6^{6}
6.	September 27, 2004	Bangkok, Thailand	Hard (i)	(United States) Justin Gimelstob	(Switzerland) Yves Allegro (Switzerland) Roger Federer	5–7, 6–4, 6–4
7.	November 8, 2004	Bratislava, Slovakia	Hard (i)	(Sweden) Simon Aspelin	(Israel) Jonathan Erlich (Israel) Noam Okun	7–6^{5}, 6–3
8.	July 18, 2005	Indianapolis, U.S.	Hard	(Australia) Paul Hanley	(Sweden) Simon Aspelin (Australia) Todd Perry	6–2, 3–1, ret.

=== Runners-up (9) ===
No.	Date	Tournament	Surface	Partner	Opponents	Score
1.	April 22, 2002	Houston, U.S.	Clay	(United States) Jan-Michael Gambill	(United States) Mardy Fish (United States) Andy Roddick	6–4, 6–4
2.	September 30, 2002	Tokyo, Japan	Hard	(United States) Jan-Michael Gambill	(South Africa) Jeff Coetzee (South Africa) Chris Haggard	7–6^{4}, 6–4
3.	January 27, 2003	Dallas, U.S.	Hard (i)	(Argentina) Martín García	(United States) Justin Gimelstob (United States) Scott Humphries	7–6^{7}, 7–6^{4}
4.	April 21, 2003	Houston, U.S.	Clay	(United States) Jan-Michael Gambill	(The Bahamas) Mark Knowles (Canada) Daniel Nestor	6–4, 6–3
5.	August 11, 2003	Bronx, U.S.	Hard	(Argentina) Martín García	(France) Julien Benneteau (France) Nicolas Mahut	6–3, 6–1
6.	June 1, 2004	Fürth, Germany	Clay	(Sweden) Simon Aspelin	(Chile) Adrián García (Serbia and Montenegro) Janko Tipsarević	6–4, 6–4
7.	September 20, 2004	Beijing, China	Hard	(United States) Justin Gimelstob	(Australia) Ashley Fisher (United States) Tripp Phillips	7–5, 7–5
8.	September 20, 2004	Champaign-Urbana, U.S.	Hard (i)	(United States) Justin Gimelstob	(United States) Brian Baker (United States) Rajeev Ram	7–6^{7}, 7–6^{5}
9.	July 4, 2005	Newport, U.S.	Grass	(United States) Travis Parrott	(Australia) Jordan Kerr (United States) Jim Thomas	7–6^{5}, 7–6^{5}
