= Benjamin Becker =

German tennis player (born 1981)

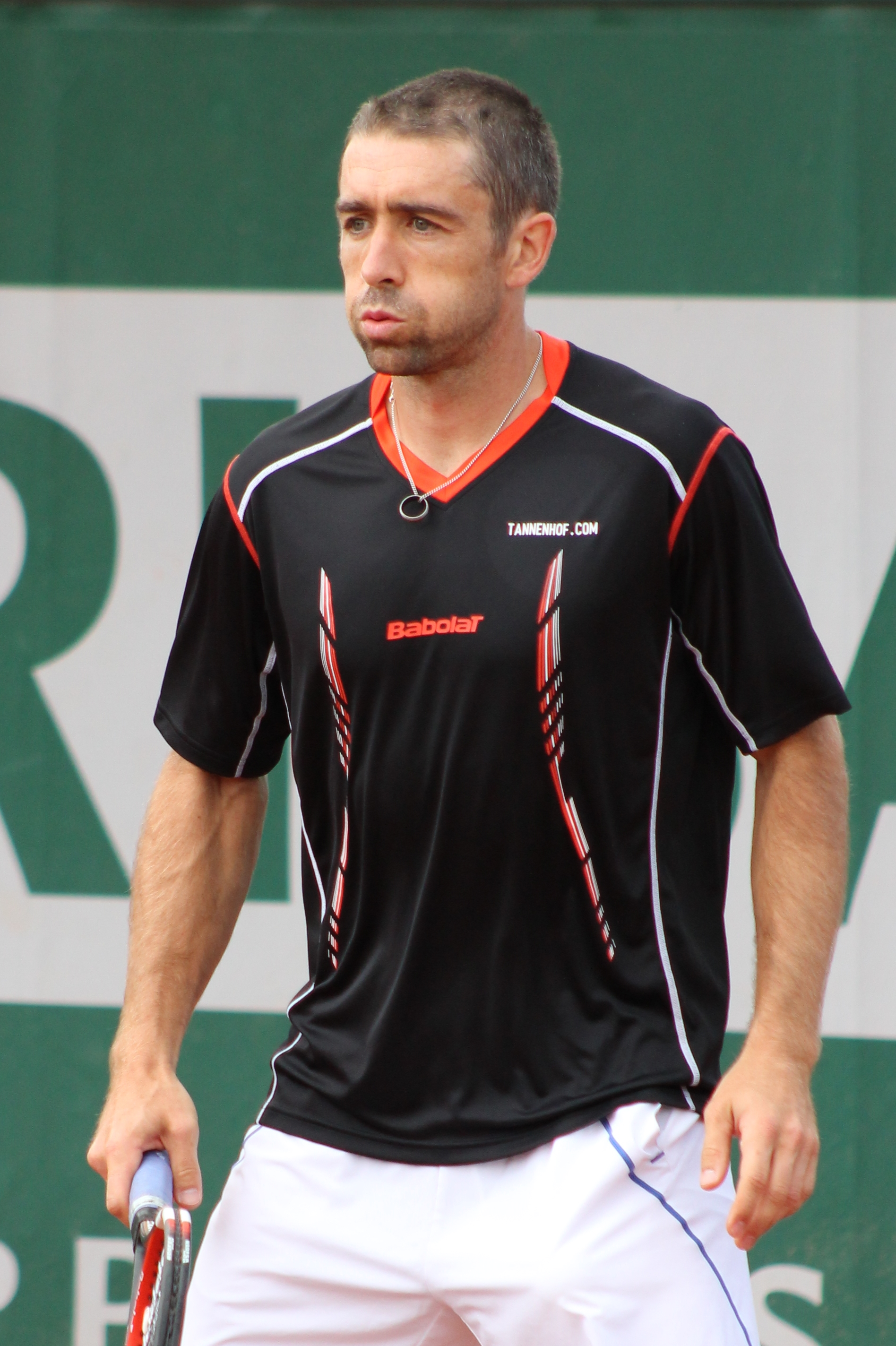
- Becker at the 2015 French Open
- Country (sports): Germany
- Residence: Mettlach, Germany
- Born: 16 July 1981 (age 45) Merzig, Saarland, West Germany
- Height: 1.78 m (5 ft 10 in)
- Turned pro: 2005
- Retired: 2017
- Plays: Right-handed (two-handed backhand)
- College: Baylor Bears
- Prize money: US$4,399,584

Singles
- Career record: 153–220
- Career titles: 1
- Highest ranking: No. 35 (27 October 2014)

Grand Slam singles results
- Australian Open: 3R (2015)
- French Open: 3R (2015)
- Wimbledon: 2R (2006, 2008, 2009, 2010, 2012, 2014, 2016)
- US Open: 4R (2006)

Doubles
- Career record: 58–106
- Career titles: 0
- Highest ranking: No. 58 (5 July 2010)

Grand Slam doubles results
- Australian Open: 3R (2011)
- French Open: 2R (2010, 2012)
- Wimbledon: 3R (2007)
- US Open: 2R (2010)

Benjamin Becker (born 16 June 1981) is a German former professional tennis player. He reached a career-high ATP ranking of No. 35 in singles on 27 October 2014, and No. 58 in doubles on 5 July 2010. Becker won an ATP Tour singles title at the 2009 Rosmalen Grass Court Championships, and had his career-best result at the majors by reaching the fourth round of the 2006 US Open, defeating former world No. 1 Andre Agassi in Agassi's last professional match to do so.

Becker is not related to German compatriot and former professional tennis player Boris Becker.

== Early life and family ==
Benjamin Becker was born on 16 June 1981 in Merzig, West Germany, to Jörg, a tax office worker, and Ulrike. Becker has one younger sister. From 2001 to 2005, Becker played tennis at Baylor University, winning the NCAA singles championship as a junior in 2004 and leading the Bears to the team title that year. In 2005, the team finished runner-up at the NCAA tournament and won the ITA team indoor championship. He is the school's all-time leader in singles and doubles wins. A rarity in men's tennis, Becker attended college for four years before turning professional.

== Career ==
=== 2006 ===
2006 was a breakthrough year for Becker. In June of that year, he qualified for Wimbledon and defeated Juan Ignacio Chela, before losing in the second round to Fernando Verdasco. At the 2006 US Open, he defeated Filippo Volandri and No. 30 seed Sébastien Grosjean to reach the third round, where he defeated former world No. 1 Andre Agassi in four sets. The match was especially noteworthy as it was Agassi's last on the ATP circuit; he had announced that the 2006 U.S. Open would be his final tournament, and his defeat was followed by an 8-minute standing ovation from the Arthur Ashe Stadium crowd. The day after Becker's win over Agassi, his own U.S. Open bid was ended by Andy Roddick in the fourth round.

Becker has the distinction of having played the match that finished second latest in ATP history, defeating Jiří Novák in Tokyo in 2006 at 3.24 a.m. Following the 2006 U.S. Open, Becker confirmed his status as a promising newcomer on the ATP Tour, improving his ranking from No. 421 at the beginning of the year to No. 62 in November 2006. As a result, Becker received the Newcomer of the Year award during the 2006 ATP Awards and won the Sportsman of the Year award in his part of Germany. After completing his first season on the ATP Tour, Becker made the fastest rise of any player into the top 50.

=== 2007 ===
2007 saw Becker improving his ranking further in the early season, including through his semi-final appearances at the Delray Beach International Tennis Championships, where he lost to world No. 8 James Blake; and in San Jose at the SAP Open where he lost to Ivo Karlović, the tallest player on the ATP Tour (6' 10"). As a result, Becker's ATP ranking peaked at No. 38 in March 2007. However, in 2007 Becker was unable to progress beyond the first round in any of the Grand Slams or ATP Masters Series events, with the exception of the Monte Carlo Masters, where he lost in the second round to Thomas Johansson.

Given his strong performance at the U.S. Open in the preceding year, Becker's first round loss in the 2007 edition caused his ranking to drop to 79. Despite good form in Bangkok, where he lost in the finals to Dmitry Tursunov, Becker finished the year ranked 84th.

=== 2009 ===
In 2009, Becker won his first ATP World Tour title, the Ordina Open in the Netherlands, defeating local hope Raemon Sluiter.

=== 2010 ===
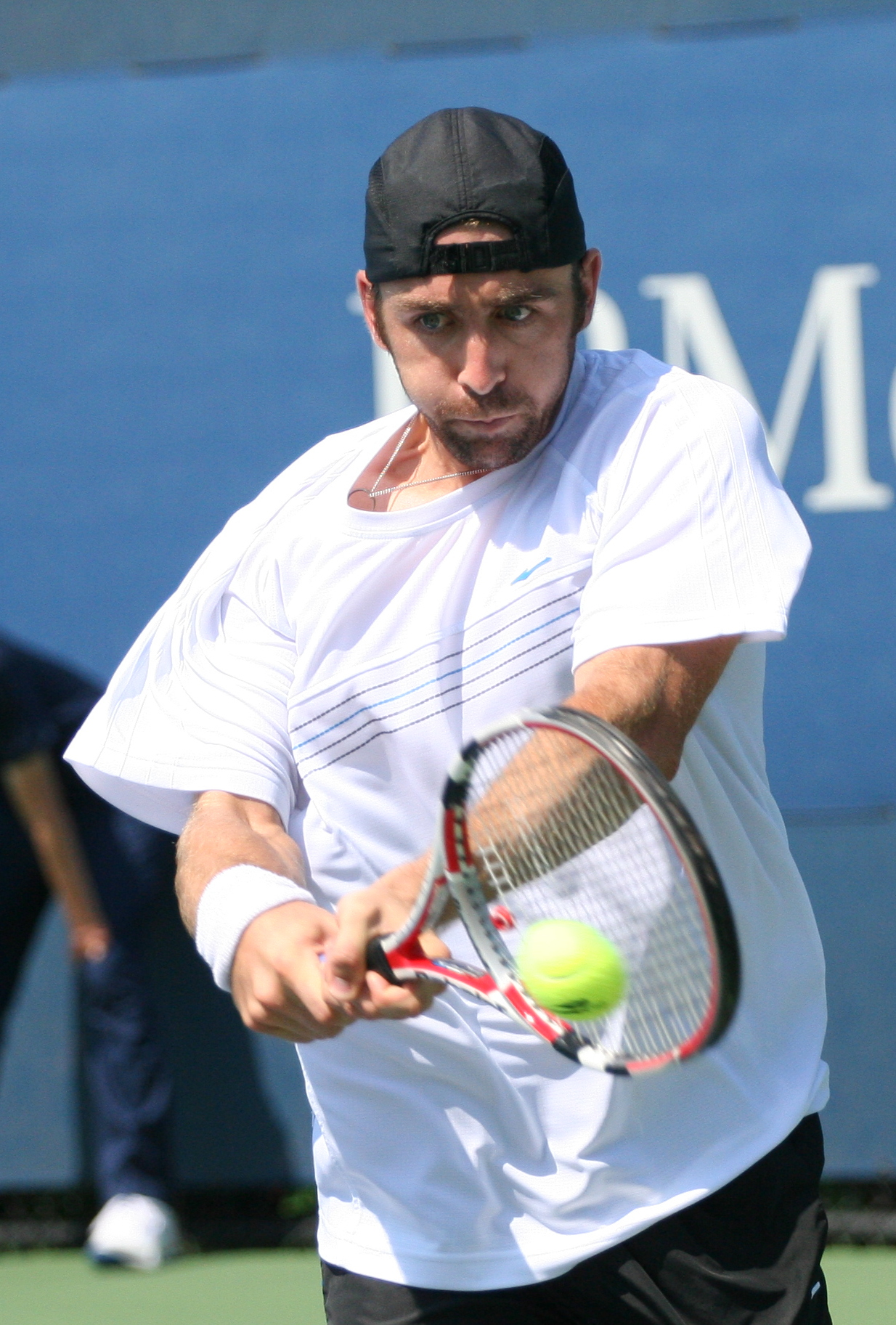
Becker at the 2010 US Open.

Becker reached the semifinal of the Gerry Weber Open in Halle, the Ordina Open in 's-Hertogenbosch and the Thailand Open in Bangkok. At the Grand Slam tournaments, Becker reached the second round of the 2010 Australian Open as well as in Wimbledon and at the 2010 US Open. He was knocked out in the first round at the 2010 French Open. He qualified for the ATP World Tour Masters 1000 tournament in Shanghai, but lost to Gaël Monfils in the first round. He advanced to the second round of the If Stockholm Open, where he lost to second seed Robin Söderling. He reached the quarterfinals at St.Petersburg, where he lost to Illya Marchenko. He qualified for the BNP Paribas Open in Paris-Bercy, where he lost to Gaël Monfils in the second round after a first-round win over Denis Istomin. He went 29–31 on the season and earned a career-high $543,431.

=== 2011 ===
Becker reached the second round in Brisbane and at the Australian Open, losing to Santiago Giraldo and Alexandr Dolgopolov. He also reached the second round at Indian Wells. The rest of the year, he played mostly Challenger tournaments.

=== 2012 ===
In 2012, Becker reached the second round in Doha, losing to Gaël Monfils, but he was eliminated in the first round of the Australian Open by Marcos Baghdatis. His best run of the year was in Memphis, where he reached the semifinals, defeating Dudi Sela, Xavier Malisse, and Łukasz Kubot, before succumbing to Milos Raonic. He defeated Olivier Rochus in the first round in Miami, but then lost to Julien Benneteau. He won a Challenger title in Nottingham, before reaching the second round at Wimbledon with a win over James Blake. He was eliminated by Radek Štěpánek.

Becker made the quarterfinals in Newport, Rhode Island, avenging his loss to Raonic in the second round, but losing to Ryan Harrison. In Washington, D.C., he defeated one American, Steve Johnson, in the first round, but fell to another, Sam Querrey, in the second. He also made the second round in Winston-Salem, defeating Tatsuma Ito, but losing to Jarkko Nieminen.

=== 2013 ===
Becker reached the second round of the Australian Open, losing to Juan Martín del Potro. He then suffered a succession of first-round exits before again reaching the final in Nottingham, where he lost to Matthew Ebden. At the Aegon Championships, he reached the quarterfinals, defeating Bernard Tomic, Lukáš Rosol, and Alexandr Dolgopolov, before losing to eventual champion Andy Murray. At Wimbledon, he went down to Murray again in the first round.

Becker won a Challenger event in Istanbul in July. At Cincinnati, he qualified and reached the second round, only to lose to Rafael Nadal. At the US Open, he defeated Lukáš Rosol in the first round, but lost to Novak Djokovic in the second. He reached the quarterfinals in Metz with wins over two Frenchmen, Benoît Paire and Albano Olivetti, but lost to another, Nicolas Mahut. Becker won another Challenger tournament in Eckental, Germany, in October.

=== 2014: Career high ranking ===
In 2014, Becker reached the second round at Chennai, losing to eventual champion Stanislas Wawrinka. He also reached the second round in Memphis, defeating Lukáš Lacko, but succumbing to eventual champion Kei Nishikori. In Miami, he qualified and made the fourth round of the main draw, where he lost to Milos Raonic. In Houston, he made the second round, where he was eliminated by Jack Sock. He made the final of the 2014 Topshelf Open grass tournament that he had won in 2009, but he lost in the final to Roberto Bautista Agut.

== ATP career finals ==
=== Singles: 3 (1 title, 2 runner-ups) ===
Legend Grand Slam tournaments (0–0) ATP World Tour Finals (0–0) ATP World Tour Masters 1000 (0–0) ATP World Tour 500 Series (0–0) ATP World Tour 250 Series (1–2)	Finals by surface Hard (0–1) Clay (0–0) Grass (1–1) Carpet (0–0)	Finals by setting Outdoor (1–1) Indoor (0–1)

Result	W–L	Date	Tournament	Tier	Surface	Opponent	Score
Loss	0–1	Sep 2007	Thailand Open, Thailand	International	Hard (i)	(Russia) Dmitry Tursunov	2–6, 1–6
Win	1–1	Jun 2009	Rosmalen Championships, Netherlands	250 Series	Grass	(Netherlands) Raemon Sluiter	7–5, 6–3
Loss	1–2	Jun 2014	Rosmalen Championships, Netherlands	250 Series	Grass	(Spain) Roberto Bautista Agut	6–2, 6–7^{(2–7)}, 4–6

=== Doubles: 2 (2 runner-ups) ===
Legend Grand Slam tournaments (0–0) ATP World Tour Finals (0–0) ATP World Tour Masters 1000 (0–0) ATP World Tour 500 Series (0–0) ATP World Tour 250 Series (0–2)	Finals by surface Hard (0–2) Clay (0–0) Grass (0–0) Carpet (0–0)	Finals by setting Outdoor (0–1) Indoor (0–1)

Result	W–L	Date	Tournament	Tier	Surface	Partner	Opponents	Score
Loss	0–1	Aug 2009	Los Angeles Open, United States	International	Hard	(Germany) Frank Moser	(United States) Bob Bryan (United States) Mike Bryan	4–6, 6–7^{(2–7)}
Loss	0–2	Feb 2010	Pacific Coast Championships, United States	250 Series	Hard (i)	(Argentina) Leonardo Mayer	(United States) Mardy Fish (United States) Sam Querrey	6–7^{(3–7)}, 5–7

== Challenger finals ==
=== Singles: 18 (9–9) ===
Outcome		Date	Tournament	Surface	Opponent	Score
Runner-up	1.	13 February 2006	Joplin, US	Hard (i)	(United States) Jesse Witten	3–6, 6–7^{(6–8)}
Winner	1.	13 March 2006	Salinas, Ecuador	Hard	(United States) Jesse Witten	4–6, 6–3, 6–2
Runner-up	2.	10 April 2006	Valencia, US	Hard	(Canada) Frédéric Niemeyer	6–4, 3–6, 2–6
Runner-up	3.	31 July 2006	Segovia, Spain	Hard	(Argentina) Juan Martín del Potro	4–6, 7–5, 4–6
Runner-up	4.	13 November 2006	Dnipropetrovsk, Ukraine	Hard (i)	(Russia) Dmitry Tursunov	6–7^{(7–9)}, 4–6
Winner	2.	26 January 2009	Heilbronn, Germany	Carpet (i)	(Slovakia) Karol Beck	6–4, 6–4
Winner	3.	6 April 2009	Baton Rouge, US	Hard	(United States) Rajeev Ram	6–2, 3–6, 6–4
Winner	4.	27 April 2009	Rhodes, Greece	Hard	(Germany) Simon Stadler	7–5, 6–3
Runner-up	5.	4 May 2009	Ramat HaSharon, Israel	Hard	(Chinese Taipei) Yen-Hsun Lu	3–6, 1–3, ret.
Winner	5.	18 May 2009	Cremona, Italy	Hard	(South Africa) Izak van der Merwe	7–6^{(7–3)}, 6–1
Winner	6.	10 June 2012	Nottingham, UK	Grass	(Russia) Dmitry Tursunov	4–6, 6–1, 6–4
Winner	7.	11 November 2012	Urtijëi, Italy	Carpet	(Italy) Andreas Seppi	6–1, 6–4
Runner-up	6.	9 June 2013	Nottingham, UK	Grass	(Australia) Matthew Ebden	5–7, 6–4, 5–7
Winner	8.	14 July 2013	Istanbul, Turkey	Hard	(Israel) Dudi Sela	6–1, 2–6, 3–2, ret.
Winner	9.	3 November 2013	Eckental, Germany	Carpet	(Belgium) Ruben Bemelmans	2–6, 7–6^{(7–3)}, 6–4
Runner-up	7.	11 October 2015	Mons, Belgium	Hard (i)	(Ukraine) Illya Marchenko	2–6, 7–6^{(10–8)}, 4–6
Runner-up	8.	8 November 2015	Eckental, Germany	Carpet (i)	(Russia) Mikhail Youzhny	5–7, 3–6
Runner-up	9.	25 September 2016	Columbus, USA	Hard (i)	(Denmark) Mikael Torpegaard	4–6, 6–1, 2–6

== Performance timelines ==
Key
W	F	SF	QF	#R	RR	Q#	DNQ	A	NH

(W) winner; (F) finalist; (SF) semifinalist; (QF) quarterfinalist; (#R) rounds 4, 3, 2, 1; (RR) round-robin stage; (Q#) qualification round; (DNQ) did not qualify; (A) absent; (NH) not held; (SR) strike rate (events won / competed); (W–L) win–loss record.

=== Singles ===
Tournament	2005	2006	2007	2008	2009	2010	2011	2012	2013	2014	2015	2016	2017	SR	W-L
Grand Slam tournaments
Australian Open	A	A	1R	1R	A	2R	2R	1R	2R	1R	3R	1R	Q1	0 / 9	5–9
French Open	A	Q3	1R	1R	A	1R	A	1R	1R	1R	3R^{[a]}	1R	Q1	0 / 8	2–7
Wimbledon	A	2R	1R	2R	2R	2R	A	2R	1R	2R	1R	2R	Q2	0 / 10	7–10
US Open	A	4R	1R	Q1	1R	2R	A	1R	2R	1R	1R	1R	A	0 / 9	5–9
Win–loss	0–0	4–2	0–4	1–3	1–2	3–4	1–1	1–4	2–4	1–4	4–3	1–4	0–0	0 / 36	19–35
ATP Masters Series 1000
Indian Wells	A	A	1R	1R	Q2	1R	2R	A	1R	1R	1R	A	Q1	0 / 7	1–7
Miami	A	A	1R	2R	2R	4R	1R	2R	1R	4R	1R	1R	1R	0 / 11	9–11
Monte Carlo	A	A	2R	A	A	2R	A	A	A	A	1R	A	A	0 / 3	2–3
Madrid	A	Q1	A	A	A	2R	A	A	A	1R	1R	Q2	A	0 / 3	1–3
Rome	A	A	1R	Q2	A	1R	A	A	A	A	A	A	A	0 / 2	0–2
Canada	A	A	A	Q2	A	A	A	Q1	1R	Q1	1R	A	A	0 / 2	0–2
Cincinnati	A	A	1R	1R	2R	1R	A	Q1	2R	2R	Q1	A	A	0 / 6	3–6
Shanghai	Not Masters Series				1R	1R	A	A	Q1	A	A	A	A	0 / 2	0–2
Paris	A	A	Q1	A	2R	2R	A	Q2	A	A	A	A	A	0 / 2	2–2
Hamburg	A	A	1R	A	Not Masters Series									0 / 1	0–1
Win–loss	0–0	0–0	1–6	1–3	3–4	6–8	1–2	1–1	1–4	3–4	0–5	0–1	0–1	0 / 39	17–39
Career statistics
Titles / Finals	0 / 0	0 / 0	0 / 1	0 / 0	1 / 1	0 / 0	0 / 0	0 / 0	0 / 0	0 / 1	0 / 0	0 / 0	0 / 0	1 / 3	
Overall win–loss	0–0	9–8	21–32	11–20	14–19	29–31	3–9	10–14	9–20	27–26	11–20	9–18	0–3	153–220	
Year-end ranking	420	58	84	129	40	53	304	65	79	40	97	119	519	41%	

^{a} 2015 French Open counts as 2 wins, 0 losses. Kei Nishikori received a walkover in the third round, after Becker withdrew because of a muscle tear in his right shoulder, does not count as a Becker loss (nor a Nishikori win).

=== Doubles ===
Tournament	2007	2008	2009	2010	2011	2012	2013	2014	2015	2016	2017	SR	W-L
Grand Slam tournaments
Australian Open	1R	A	A	1R	3R	A	1R	1R	3R	2R	A	0 / 7	5–7
French Open	1R	A	A	2R	A	2R	1R	1R	1R	A	A	0 / 6	2–6
Wimbledon	3R	A	1R	1R	A	2R	A	1R	1R	A	A	0 / 6	3–6
US Open	1R	A	1R	2R	A	1R	A	2R	A	A	A	0 / 5	2–5
Win–loss	2–4	0–0	0–2	2–4	2–1	2–3	0–2	1–4	2–3	1–1	0–0	0 / 24	12–24

== Wins over top 10 players ==
Season	2005	2006	2007	2008	2009	2010	2011	2012	2013	2014	2015	2016	2017	Total
Wins	0	0	1	1	1	2	1	0	0	0	0	0	0	6

#	Player	Rank	Event	Surface	Rd	Score	BB Rank
2007
1.	(Czech Republic) Tomáš Berdych	10	Bangkok, Thailand	Hard (i)	SF	3–6, 6–4, 6–4	79
2008
2.	(Russia) Nikolay Davydenko	4	Wimbledon, London, United Kingdom	Grass	1R	6–4, 6–4, 6–4	116
2009
3.	(Spain) Fernando Verdasco	8	s-Hertogenbosch, Netherlands	Grass	2R	7–5, 7–6^{(7–4)}	82
2010
4.	(Russia) Nikolay Davydenko	5	Halle, Germany	Grass	2R	6–3, 6–4	52
5.	(Spain) Fernando Verdasco	8	Bangkok, Thailand	Hard (i)	2R	6–4, 6–4	65
2011
6.	(Spain) Fernando Verdasco	9	Brisbane, Australia	Hard	1R	6–1, 6–7^{(2–7)}, 6–3	53

Awards
Preceded by Gaël Monfils	ATP Newcomer of the Year; 2006	Succeeded by Jo-Wilfried Tsonga
