= Thailand Open (ATP) =

Coordinates: 13.913°N 100.548°E

Defunct tennis tournament
- Founded: 2003
- Abolished: 2013
- Location: Bangkok; Thailand
- Venue: Impact Arena
- Category: ATP International Series (2003–2008); ATP World Tour 250 series (2009–2013)
- Surface: Hard / indoors
- Draw: 32S/16D

The Thailand Open was a professional indoor hardcourt tennis tournament held in Bangkok, Thailand, from 2003 to 2013. Part of the ATP World Tour 250 series, it was held in the third week of September. The tournament was relocated by the Association of Tennis Professionals to Shenzhen as the ATP Shenzhen Open since 2013.

From 2005 to 2007, a WTA Tier III, the PTT Bangkok Open, was also held in the region before being discontinued.

Roger Federer is the only man to have won the singles competition more than once, in 2004 and 2005, while Andy Ram and Jonathan Erlich are the only doubles pair to have won the competition multiple times, in 2003 and 2006. In 2007, Sonchat Ratiwatana and Sanchai Ratiwatana became the first Thai champions of the event, winning in the final against Wimbledon doubles champion Michaël Llodra, and partner Nicolas Mahut. In November 2013, the ATP announced that the tournament would be relocated to Shenzhen, China, as the ATP Shenzhen Open.

== Past finals ==
=== Singles ===
Previous logo of the event

Year	Champions	Runners-up	Score
2003	(United States) Taylor Dent	(Spain) Juan Carlos Ferrero	6–3, 7–6^{(7–5)}
2004	(Switzerland) Roger Federer	(United States) Andy Roddick	6–4, 6–0
2005	(Switzerland) Roger Federer	(United Kingdom) Andy Murray	6–3, 7–5
2006	(United States) James Blake	(Croatia) Ivan Ljubičić	6–3, 6–1
2007	(Russia) Dmitry Tursunov	(Germany) Benjamin Becker	6–2, 6–1
2008	(France) Jo-Wilfried Tsonga	(Serbia) Novak Djokovic	7–6^{(7–4)}, 6–4
2009	(France) Gilles Simon	(Serbia) Viktor Troicki	7–5, 6–3
2010	(Spain) Guillermo García-López	(Finland) Jarkko Nieminen	6–4, 3–6, 6–4
2011	(United Kingdom) Andy Murray	(United States) Donald Young	6–2, 6–0
2012	(France) Richard Gasquet	(France) Gilles Simon	6–2, 6–1
2013	(Canada) Milos Raonic	(Czech Republic) Tomáš Berdych	7–6^{(7–4)}, 6–3
2014	succeeded by Shenzhen Open		

=== Doubles ===
Year	Champions	Runners-up	Score
2003	(Israel) Jonathan Erlich (Israel) Andy Ram	(Australia) Andrew Kratzmann (Finland) Jarkko Nieminen	6–3, 7–6^{(7–4)}
2004	(United States) Justin Gimelstob (United States) Graydon Oliver	(Switzerland) Yves Allegro (Switzerland) Roger Federer	5–7, 6–4, 6–4
2005	(Australia) Paul Hanley (India) Leander Paes	(Israel) Jonathan Erlich (Israel) Andy Ram	6–7^{(5–7)}, 6–1, 6–2
2006	(Israel) Jonathan Erlich (Israel) Andy Ram	(United Kingdom) Andy Murray (United Kingdom) Jamie Murray	6–2, 2–6, [10–4]
2007	(Thailand) Sonchat Ratiwatana (Thailand) Sanchai Ratiwatana	(France) Michaël Llodra (France) Nicolas Mahut	3–6, 7–5, [10–7]
2008	(Czech Republic) Lukáš Dlouhý (India) Leander Paes	(United States) Scott Lipsky (United States) David Martin	6–4, 7–6^{(7–4)}
2009	(United States) Eric Butorac (United States) Rajeev Ram	(Spain) Guillermo García-López (Germany) Mischa Zverev	7–6^{(7–4)}, 6–3
2010	(Serbia) Viktor Troicki (Germany) Christopher Kas	(Israel) Jonathan Erlich (Austria) Jürgen Melzer	6–4, 6–4
2011	(Austria) Oliver Marach (Pakistan) Aisam-ul-Haq Qureshi	(Germany) Michael Kohlmann (Germany) Alexander Waske	7–6^{(7–4)}, 7–6^{(7–5)}
2012	(Chinese Taipei) Lu Yen-hsun (Thailand) Danai Udomchoke	(United States) Eric Butorac (Australia) Paul Hanley	6–3, 6–4
2013	(United Kingdom) Jamie Murray (Australia) John Peers	(Poland) Tomasz Bednarek (Sweden) Johan Brunström	6-3, 3-6, [10-6]
2014	succeeded by Shenzhen Open		

== See also ==
- Thailand Open (Pattaya) – women's tournament
- WTA Thailand Open - WTA 250 event
