= 2009 ATP World Tour =

Men's tennis circuit

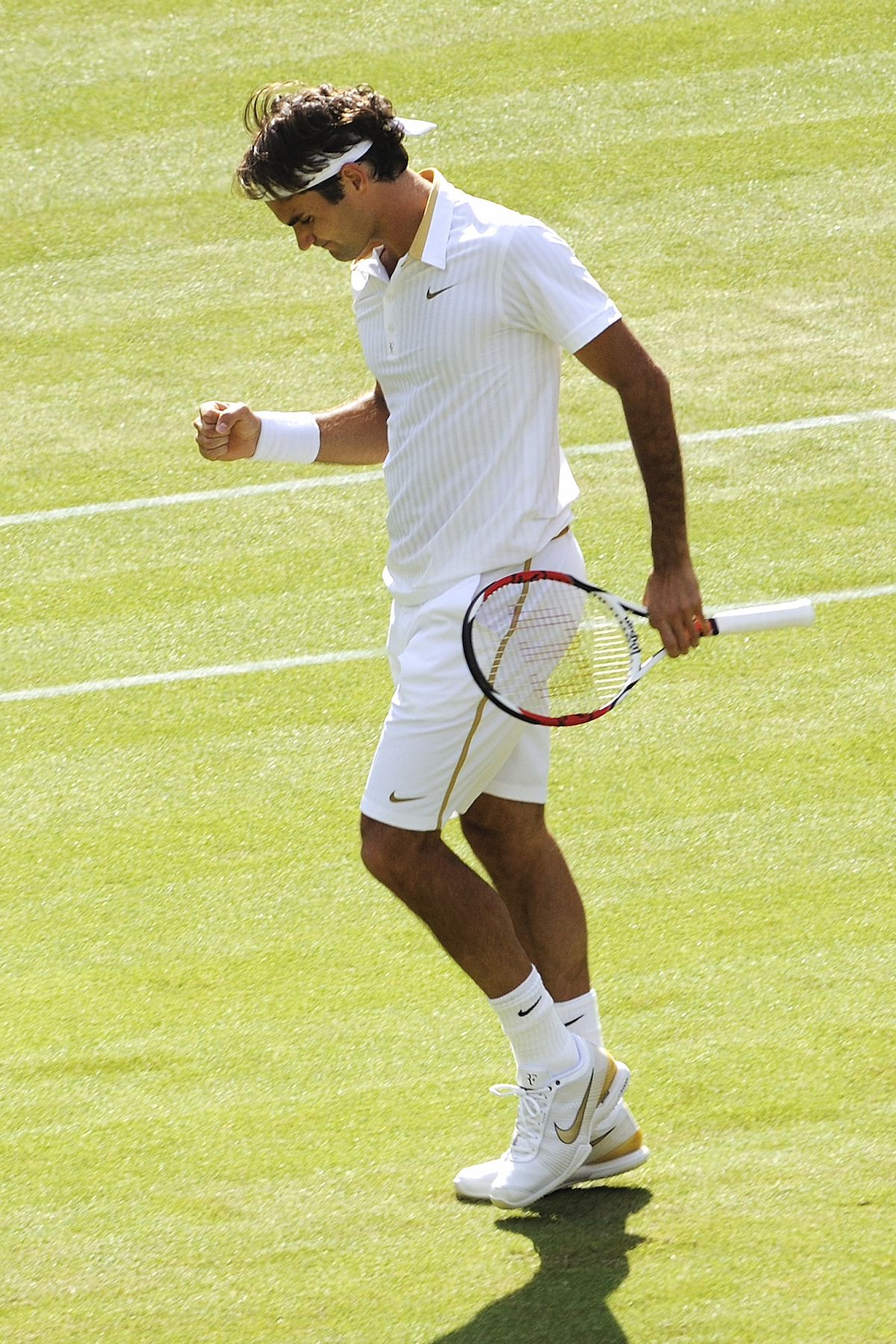
- Roger Federer finished the year as world No. 1 for the fifth time in his career. He won four tournaments during the season, including two majors at the French Open (completing the career Grand Slam) and the Wimbledon Championships. He also won two Masters events and finished runner-up at the other two majors, the Australian Open and the US Open.

Details
- Duration: January 3, 2009 – November 30, 2009
- Tournaments: 68
- Categories: Grand Slam (4); World Tour Masters 1000 (9); World Tour 500 (11); World Tour 250 (40)

Achievements (singles)
- Most titles: (United Kingdom) Andy Murray (6)
- Most finals: (Serbia) Novak Djokovic (10)
- Prize money leader: (Switzerland) Roger Federer ($8,761,805)
- Points leader: (Switzerland) Roger Federer (10,550)

Awards
- Player of the year: (Switzerland) Roger Federer
- Doubles team of the year: (United States) Bob Bryan (United States) Mike Bryan
- Most improved player of the year: (United States) John Isner
- Newcomer of the year: (Argentina) Horacio Zeballos
- Comeback player of the year: (Switzerland) Marco Chiudinelli

The Association of Tennis Professionals (ATP) World Tour is the elite professional tennis circuit organised by the ATP. The 2009 ATP World Tour calendar comprises the Grand Slam tournaments (supervised by the International Tennis Federation (ITF)), the ATP World Tour Masters 1000, the ATP World Tour 500 series, the ATP World Tour 250 series, the ATP World Team Championship, the Davis Cup (organized by the ITF), and the ATP World Tour Finals. Also included in the 2009 calendar is the Hopman Cup, which does not distribute ranking points, and is organised by the ITF.

== Tour changes ==
The ATP reinstated the world tour to its name as the organisation rebranded itself as the ATP World Tour. ATP World Tour tournaments in 2009 are classified as ATP World Tour Masters 1000, ATP World Tour 500, and ATP World Tour 250. Broadly speaking the Tennis Masters Series tournaments became the new Masters 1000 level and ATP International Series Gold and ATP International Series events became ATP 500 level and 250 level events.

The World Tour Masters 1000 includes tournaments at Indian Wells, Miami, Monte Carlo, Rome, Madrid, Toronto/Montreal, Cincinnati, Shanghai, and Paris. The end-of-year event, the Tour Finals, moved to London. Hamburg has been displaced by the new clay court event at Madrid, which is a new combined men's and women's tournament, and the indoor hard court event in Madrid was replaced by an outdoor hard court Masters tournament in Shanghai. From 2011, Rome and Cincinnati will also be combined tournaments. Severe sanctions will be placed on top players skipping the Masters 1000 series events, unless medical proof is presented. Plans to eliminate Monte Carlo and Hamburg as Masters Series events led to controversy and protests from players as well as organisers. Hamburg and Monte Carlo filed lawsuits against the ATP, and as a concession it was decided that Monte Carlo remains a Masters 1000 level event, with more prize money and 1000 ranking points, but it would no longer be a compulsory tournament for top-ranked players. Monte Carlo later dropped its suit. Hamburg was "reserved" to become a 500 level event in the summer. Hamburg did not accept this concession, but later lost its suit.

The World Tour 500 level includes tournaments at Rotterdam, Dubai, Acapulco, Memphis, Barcelona, Hamburg, Washington, Beijing, Tokyo, Basel, and Valencia.

The ATP & ITF declared that 2009 Davis Cup World Group and World Group Playoffs award a total of up to 500 points. Players accumulate points over the four rounds and the playoffs and these are counted as one of a player's four best results from the 500 level events. An additional 125 points are given to a player who wins all eight live rubbers and wins the Davis Cup.

Otherwise, the domain name of their website was changed to "www.atpworldtour.com".

== Season summary ==
The 2009 ATP World Tour season saw Roger Federer break Pete Sampras's Grand Slam record of 14 men's singles titles, capturing his first French Open title and his sixth Wimbledon title in the process, marking 15 Grand Slam tournament victories to his name. This success came after losing to his main rival, Rafael Nadal, in the Australian Open final 7–5, 3–6, 7–6^{(7–3)}, 3–6, 6–2 in what has been lauded as one of the greatest Australian Open finals of all-time. This victory gave Nadal his first Grand Slam title on hard court, his sixth major title overall and put an end to Federer’s 8–0 record in slam finals on hard court.

This defeat for Federer came at his first opportunity in a slam final to tie Sampras’s record of most Grand Slams won in men’s singles and came on the back of consecutive defeats to Nadal at the previous years French Open and Wimbledon. It also marked the first and only time in Nadal’s career that he’d win a slam having come through 5 set matches in both the semifinals and final, beating fellow Spaniard Fernando Verdasco in an epic that lasted 5 hours, 14 minutes in the semis. Nadal would continue his dominance of the tour by winning titles in Indian Wells, Monte Carlo, Barcelona and Rome before falling to Federer in the final of Madrid. This was Federer's first Masters Series title since winning Cincinnati in 2007 and his first win over Nadal since the 2007 Tennis Masters cup, having lost the previous 5 matches they played.

Nadal was shocked in the fourth round of the French Open by big hitting Swede Robin Söderling, marking the first ever defeat Nadal had endured at the French Open. This has been described as one of the biggest upsets in tennis history. Federer came through tough tests earlier in the French Open, coming from 2 sets down to defeat Tommy Haas in the fourth round and beating Juan Martín del Potro in a 5-setter in the semis to advance to his fourth French Open final. Söderling himself would come through a 5-setter in the semis against Fernando González, only to lose to Federer in the final in straight sets 6–1, 7–6^{(7–1)}, 6–4. With this win, Federer captured his first and only French Open title, equalling Pete Sampras’s then record of 14 Grand Slam titles and in the process becoming the sixth man in singles history to complete the Career Grand Slam.

Federer then captured his sixth Wimbledon and 15th slam overall by defeating Andy Roddick in the final 5–7, 7–6^{(8–6)}, 7–6^{(7–5)}, 3–6, 16–14 in the longest men’s singles major final in history (in terms of games played). This was the third and final time the two would play in a Wimbledon final with Federer winning all three encounters. By winning this, Federer became the first player to win 15 men’s singles Grand Slam titles passing Pete Sampras’s prior record of 14. By winning the French Open and Wimbledon back to back, Federer became the eighth man of all time to complete the channel slam and the fourth man of the open era (along with Rod Laver, Björn Borg and Rafael Nadal). This win also saw Federer regain the No. 1 position at the top of the ATP rankings and would later end the season ranked No. 1. Later in the summer, Federer would win his third Cincinnati Masters title beating Novak Djokovic in the final.

At the US Open, 20 year old Argentine Juan Martín del Potro captured his first and only major title and in doing so became the first man to defeat both Nadal and Federer back to back in a Grand Slam tournament. This came in a period in time when both Federer and Nadal had dominated the game for the past 5 seasons, winning 17 of the past 18 slams from the 2005 French Open onwards, with the exception being Novak Djokovic’s first slam victory at the 2008 Australian Open. Djokovic also became the only other man that would later be able to defeat both Nadal and Federer back to back to win a slam title. Del Potro defeated Federer in a 5 set epic 3–6, 7–6^{(7–5)}, 4–6, 7–6^{(7–4)}, 6–2, thus ending Federer’s 40-match winning streak at the US Open.

After the US Open, Nikolay Davydenko would win his third career Masters Series title by beating Nadal in the finals of Shanghai and would go on to achieve his biggest career achievement by winning the ATP World Tour Finals. Davydenko successfully defeated Nadal, Söderling, Federer and del Potro en route and became the inaugural winner of the Year-End Championships during its stretch held in London (2009–2020). Novak Djokovic and Andy Murray were two other competitors who also had good success during the 2009 season, with Djokovic winning the Paris Masters, 3 500 Series tournaments in Dubai, Beijing and Basel, and the inaugural Serbia Open in Djokovic’s home city of Belgrade. Murray won 2 Masters 1000 titles in Miami and Montreal and also won 4 other titles in Doha, Rotterdam, London and Valencia.

Spain successfully defended their Davis Cup title by defeating Czech Republic 5–0 in the final with the help of Rafael Nadal, David Ferrer, Fernando Verdasco and Feliciano López on clay in Barcelona. In doubles, Lukáš Dlouhý and Leander Paes won 2 Grand Slam titles in 2009, winning both the French Open and the US Open. However, Bob and Mike Bryan successfully captured the Australian Open and ATP World Tour Finals titles, ending the season both ranked No. 1. Daniel Nestor and Nenad Zimonjić were victorious at Wimbledon.

== Schedule ==
This is the complete schedule of events on the 2009 calendar, with player progression documented from the quarterfinals stage.

Key

Grand Slam
ATP World Tour Finals
ATP World Tour Masters 1000
ATP World Tour 500
ATP World Tour 250
Team Events

=== January ===
Week	Tournament	Champions	Runners-up	Semifinalists	Quarterfinalists
5 Jan	Hyundai Hopman Cup; Perth, Australia; Hopman Cup; Hard (i) – A$1,000,000 – 8 teams (RR)	Slovakia; 2–0	Russia	Round Robin (Group A) Germany; United States; Australia	Round Robin (Group B) Italy; France; Chinese Taipei
5 Jan	Brisbane International; Brisbane, Australia; ATP World Tour 250; Hard – $484,750 – 32S/16D; Singles – Doubles	(Czech Republic) Radek Štěpánek; 3–6, 6–3, 6–4	(Spain) Fernando Verdasco	(France) Paul-Henri Mathieu (France) Richard Gasquet	(Japan) Kei Nishikori (France) Florent Serra (Sweden) Robin Söderling (France) Jo-Wilfried Tsonga
5 Jan	Brisbane International; Brisbane, Australia; ATP World Tour 250; Hard – $484,750 – 32S/16D; Singles – Doubles	(France) Marc Gicquel (France) Jo-Wilfried Tsonga; 6–4, 6–3	(Spain) Fernando Verdasco (Germany) Mischa Zverev	(France) Paul-Henri Mathieu (France) Richard Gasquet	(Japan) Kei Nishikori (France) Florent Serra (Sweden) Robin Söderling (France) Jo-Wilfried Tsonga
5 Jan	Qatar ExxonMobil Open; Doha, Qatar; ATP World Tour 250; Hard – $1,110,250 – 32S/16D; Singles – Doubles	(United Kingdom) Andy Murray; 6–4, 6–2	(United States) Andy Roddick	(France) Gaël Monfils (Switzerland) Roger Federer	(Spain) Rafael Nadal (Romania) Victor Hănescu (Ukraine) Sergiy Stakhovsky (Germany) Philipp Kohlschreiber
5 Jan	Qatar ExxonMobil Open; Doha, Qatar; ATP World Tour 250; Hard – $1,110,250 – 32S/16D; Singles – Doubles	(Spain) Marc López (Spain) Rafael Nadal; 4–6, 6–4, [10–8]	(Canada) Daniel Nestor (Serbia) Nenad Zimonjić	(France) Gaël Monfils (Switzerland) Roger Federer	(Spain) Rafael Nadal (Romania) Victor Hănescu (Ukraine) Sergiy Stakhovsky (Germany) Philipp Kohlschreiber
5 Jan	Chennai Open; Chennai, India; ATP World Tour 250; Hard – $450,000 – 32S/16D; Singles – Doubles	(Croatia) Marin Čilić; 6–4, 7–6^{(7–3)}	(India) Somdev Devvarman	(Spain) Marcel Granollers (Germany) Rainer Schüttler	(Czech Republic) Lukáš Dlouhý (Serbia) Janko Tipsarević (Croatia) Ivo Karlović (Germany) Björn Phau
5 Jan	Chennai Open; Chennai, India; ATP World Tour 250; Hard – $450,000 – 32S/16D; Singles – Doubles	(United States) Eric Butorac (United States) Rajeev Ram; 6–3, 6–4	(Switzerland) Jean-Claude Scherrer (Switzerland) Stanislas Wawrinka	(Spain) Marcel Granollers (Germany) Rainer Schüttler	(Czech Republic) Lukáš Dlouhý (Serbia) Janko Tipsarević (Croatia) Ivo Karlović (Germany) Björn Phau
12 Jan	Heineken Open; Auckland, New Zealand; ATP World Tour 250; Hard – $480,750 – 28S/16D; Singles – Doubles	(Argentina) Juan Martín del Potro; 6–4, 6–4	(United States) Sam Querrey	(Sweden) Robin Söderling (Spain) David Ferrer	(Serbia) Viktor Troicki (United States) John Isner (Spain) Nicolás Almagro (Germany) Philipp Kohlschreiber
12 Jan	Heineken Open; Auckland, New Zealand; ATP World Tour 250; Hard – $480,750 – 28S/16D; Singles – Doubles	(Czech Republic) Martin Damm (Sweden) Robert Lindstedt; 7–5, 6–4	(United States) Scott Lipsky (India) Leander Paes	(Sweden) Robin Söderling (Spain) David Ferrer	(Serbia) Viktor Troicki (United States) John Isner (Spain) Nicolás Almagro (Germany) Philipp Kohlschreiber
12 Jan	Medibank International Sydney; Sydney, Australia; ATP World Tour 250; Hard – $484,750 – 28S/16D; Singles – Doubles	(Argentina) David Nalbandian; 6–3, 6–7^{(9–11)}, 6–2	(Finland) Jarkko Nieminen	(Serbia) Novak Djokovic (France) Richard Gasquet	(Croatia) Mario Ančić (France) Jo-Wilfried Tsonga (Australia) Lleyton Hewitt (France) Jérémy Chardy
12 Jan	Medibank International Sydney; Sydney, Australia; ATP World Tour 250; Hard – $484,750 – 28S/16D; Singles – Doubles	(United States) Bob Bryan (United States) Mike Bryan; 6–1, 7–6^{(7–3)}	(Canada) Daniel Nestor (Serbia) Nenad Zimonjić	(Serbia) Novak Djokovic (France) Richard Gasquet	(Croatia) Mario Ančić (France) Jo-Wilfried Tsonga (Australia) Lleyton Hewitt (France) Jérémy Chardy
19 Jan; 26 Jan	Australian Open; Melbourne, Australia; Grand Slam; Hard – A$10,712,240; 128S/128Q/64D/32X; Singles – Doubles – Mixed doubles	(Spain) Rafael Nadal; 7–5, 3–6, 7–6^{(7–3)}, 3–6, 6–2	(Switzerland) Roger Federer	(Spain) Fernando Verdasco (United States) Andy Roddick	(France) Gilles Simon (France) Jo-Wilfried Tsonga (Serbia) Novak Djokovic (Argentina) Juan Martín del Potro
19 Jan; 26 Jan	Australian Open; Melbourne, Australia; Grand Slam; Hard – A$10,712,240; 128S/128Q/64D/32X; Singles – Doubles – Mixed doubles	(United States) Bob Bryan (United States) Mike Bryan; 2–6, 7–5, 6–0	(India) Mahesh Bhupathi (The Bahamas) Mark Knowles	(Spain) Fernando Verdasco (United States) Andy Roddick	(France) Gilles Simon (France) Jo-Wilfried Tsonga (Serbia) Novak Djokovic (Argentina) Juan Martín del Potro
19 Jan; 26 Jan	Australian Open; Melbourne, Australia; Grand Slam; Hard – A$10,712,240; 128S/128Q/64D/32X; Singles – Doubles – Mixed doubles	(India) Mahesh Bhupathi (India) Sania Mirza; 6–3, 6–1	(Israel) Andy Ram (France) Nathalie Dechy	(Spain) Fernando Verdasco (United States) Andy Roddick	(France) Gilles Simon (France) Jo-Wilfried Tsonga (Serbia) Novak Djokovic (Argentina) Juan Martín del Potro

=== February ===
Week	Tournament	Champions	Runners-up	Semifinalists	Quarterfinalists
2 Feb	SA Tennis Open; Johannesburg, South Africa; ATP World Tour 250; Hard – $500,000 – 32S/16D; Singles – Doubles	(France) Jo-Wilfried Tsonga; 6–4, 7–6^{(7–5)}	(France) Jérémy Chardy	(Portugal) Frederico Gil (Spain) David Ferrer	(Belgium) Kristof Vliegen (Spain) Guillermo García López (France) Sébastien de Chaunac (Cyprus) Marcos Baghdatis
2 Feb	SA Tennis Open; Johannesburg, South Africa; ATP World Tour 250; Hard – $500,000 – 32S/16D; Singles – Doubles	(United States) James Cerretani (Belgium) Dick Norman; 6–7^{(7–9)}, 6–2, [14–12]	(South Africa) Rik de Voest (Australia) Ashley Fisher	(Portugal) Frederico Gil (Spain) David Ferrer	(Belgium) Kristof Vliegen (Spain) Guillermo García López (France) Sébastien de Chaunac (Cyprus) Marcos Baghdatis
2 Feb	Movistar Open; Viña del Mar, Chile; ATP World Tour 250; Clay – $496,750 – 28S/16D; Singles – Doubles	(Chile) Fernando González; 6–1, 6–3	(Argentina) José Acasuso	(Uruguay) Pablo Cuevas (Spain) Tommy Robredo	(Argentina) Juan Mónaco (Chile) Paul Capdeville (Argentina) Sebastián Decoud (Argentina) Juan Ignacio Chela
2 Feb	Movistar Open; Viña del Mar, Chile; ATP World Tour 250; Clay – $496,750 – 28S/16D; Singles – Doubles	(Uruguay) Pablo Cuevas (Argentina) Brian Dabul; 6–3, 6–3	(Czech Republic) František Čermák (Slovakia) Michal Mertiňák	(Uruguay) Pablo Cuevas (Spain) Tommy Robredo	(Argentina) Juan Mónaco (Chile) Paul Capdeville (Argentina) Sebastián Decoud (Argentina) Juan Ignacio Chela
2 Feb	PBZ Zagreb Indoors; Zagreb, Croatia; ATP World Tour 250; Hard (i) – €450,000 – 32S/16D; Singles – Doubles	(Croatia) Marin Čilić; 6–3, 6–4	(Croatia) Mario Ančić	(Czech Republic) Jan Hernych (Serbia) Viktor Troicki	(Croatia) Ivan Dodig (Germany) Mischa Zverev (Ukraine) Sergiy Stakhovsky (Croatia) Antonio Veić
2 Feb	PBZ Zagreb Indoors; Zagreb, Croatia; ATP World Tour 250; Hard (i) – €450,000 – 32S/16D; Singles – Doubles	(Czech Republic) Martin Damm (Sweden) Robert Lindstedt; 6–4, 6–3	(Germany) Christopher Kas (Netherlands) Rogier Wassen	(Czech Republic) Jan Hernych (Serbia) Viktor Troicki	(Croatia) Ivan Dodig (Germany) Mischa Zverev (Ukraine) Sergiy Stakhovsky (Croatia) Antonio Veić
9 Feb	ABN AMRO World Tennis Tournament; Rotterdam, Netherlands; ATP World Tour 500; Hard (i) – €1,445,000 – 32S/16D; Singles – Doubles	(United Kingdom) Andy Murray; 6–3, 4–6, 6–0	(Spain) Rafael Nadal	(France) Gaël Monfils (Croatia) Mario Ančić	(France) Jo-Wilfried Tsonga (France) Julien Benneteau (Russia) Mikhail Youzhny (France) Marc Gicquel
9 Feb	ABN AMRO World Tennis Tournament; Rotterdam, Netherlands; ATP World Tour 500; Hard (i) – €1,445,000 – 32S/16D; Singles – Doubles	(Canada) Daniel Nestor (Serbia) Nenad Zimonjić; 6–2, 7–5	(Czech Republic) Lukáš Dlouhý (India) Leander Paes	(France) Gaël Monfils (Croatia) Mario Ančić	(France) Jo-Wilfried Tsonga (France) Julien Benneteau (Russia) Mikhail Youzhny (France) Marc Gicquel
9 Feb	SAP Open; San Jose, United States; ATP World Tour 250; Hard (i) – $600,000 – 32S/16D; Singles – Doubles	(Czech Republic) Radek Štěpánek; 3–6, 6–4, 6–2	(United States) Mardy Fish	(United States) Andy Roddick (United States) James Blake	(Germany) Tommy Haas (United States) Todd Widom (United States) Sam Querrey (Argentina) Juan Martín del Potro
9 Feb	SAP Open; San Jose, United States; ATP World Tour 250; Hard (i) – $600,000 – 32S/16D; Singles – Doubles	(Germany) Tommy Haas (Czech Republic) Radek Štěpánek; 6–2, 6–3	(India) Rohan Bopanna (Finland) Jarkko Nieminen	(United States) Andy Roddick (United States) James Blake	(Germany) Tommy Haas (United States) Todd Widom (United States) Sam Querrey (Argentina) Juan Martín del Potro
9 Feb	Brasil Open; Costa do Sauípe, Brazil; ATP World Tour 250; Clay – $562,500 – 32S/26Q/16D; Singles – Doubles	(Spain) Tommy Robredo; 6–3, 3–6, 6–4	(Brazil) Thomaz Bellucci	(Portugal) Frederico Gil (Argentina) José Acasuso	(Spain) Nicolás Almagro (Spain) Juan Carlos Ferrero (Argentina) Eduardo Schwank (Spain) Alberto Martín
9 Feb	Brasil Open; Costa do Sauípe, Brazil; ATP World Tour 250; Clay – $562,500 – 32S/26Q/16D; Singles – Doubles	(Spain) Marcel Granollers (Spain) Tommy Robredo; 6–4, 7–5	(Argentina) Lucas Arnold Ker (Argentina) Juan Mónaco	(Portugal) Frederico Gil (Argentina) José Acasuso	(Spain) Nicolás Almagro (Spain) Juan Carlos Ferrero (Argentina) Eduardo Schwank (Spain) Alberto Martín
16 Feb	Regions Morgan Keegan Championships; Memphis, United States; ATP World Tour 500; Hard (i) – $1,226,500 – 32S/16D; Singles – Doubles	(United States) Andy Roddick; 7–5, 7–5	(Czech Republic) Radek Štěpánek	(Australia) Lleyton Hewitt (Israel) Dudi Sela	(United States) Sam Querrey (Belgium) Christophe Rochus (Russia) Igor Kunitsyn (Argentina) Juan Martín del Potro
16 Feb	Regions Morgan Keegan Championships; Memphis, United States; ATP World Tour 500; Hard (i) – $1,226,500 – 32S/16D; Singles – Doubles	(United States) Mardy Fish (The Bahamas) Mark Knowles; 7–6^{(9–7)}, 6–1	(United States) Travis Parrott (Slovakia) Filip Polášek	(Australia) Lleyton Hewitt (Israel) Dudi Sela	(United States) Sam Querrey (Belgium) Christophe Rochus (Russia) Igor Kunitsyn (Argentina) Juan Martín del Potro
16 Feb	Copa Telmex; Buenos Aires, Argentina; ATP World Tour 250; Clay – $600,000 – 32S/16D; Singles – Doubles	(Spain) Tommy Robredo; 7–5, 2–6, 7–6^{(7–5)}	(Argentina) Juan Mónaco	(Argentina) David Nalbandian (Argentina) José Acasuso	(Spain) Juan Carlos Ferrero (Argentina) Máximo González (Brazil) Franco Ferreiro (Spain) Óscar Hernández
16 Feb	Copa Telmex; Buenos Aires, Argentina; ATP World Tour 250; Clay – $600,000 – 32S/16D; Singles – Doubles	(Spain) Marcel Granollers (Spain) Alberto Martín; 6–3, 5–7, [10–8]	(Spain) Nicolás Almagro (Spain) Santiago Ventura	(Argentina) David Nalbandian (Argentina) José Acasuso	(Spain) Juan Carlos Ferrero (Argentina) Máximo González (Brazil) Franco Ferreiro (Spain) Óscar Hernández
16 Feb	Open 13; Marseille, France; ATP World Tour 250; Hard (i) – €576,000 – 32S/16D; Singles – Doubles	(France) Jo-Wilfried Tsonga; 7–5, 7–6^{(7–3)}	(France) Michaël Llodra	(Serbia) Novak Djokovic (France) Gilles Simon	(Germany) Mischa Zverev (Spain) Feliciano López (Russia) Mikhail Youzhny (France) Julien Benneteau
16 Feb	Open 13; Marseille, France; ATP World Tour 250; Hard (i) – €576,000 – 32S/16D; Singles – Doubles	(France) Arnaud Clément (France) Michaël Llodra; 3–6, 6–3, [10–8]	(Austria) Julian Knowle (Israel) Andy Ram	(Serbia) Novak Djokovic (France) Gilles Simon	(Germany) Mischa Zverev (Spain) Feliciano López (Russia) Mikhail Youzhny (France) Julien Benneteau
23 Feb	Barclays Dubai Tennis Championships; Dubai, United Arab Emirates; ATP World Tour 500; Hard – $2,233,000 – 32S/16D; Singles – Doubles	(Serbia) Novak Djokovic; 7–5, 6–3	(Spain) David Ferrer	(France) Gilles Simon (France) Richard Gasquet	(Croatia) Marin Čilić (France) Fabrice Santoro (Russia) Igor Andreev (United Kingdom) Andy Murray
23 Feb	Barclays Dubai Tennis Championships; Dubai, United Arab Emirates; ATP World Tour 500; Hard – $2,233,000 – 32S/16D; Singles – Doubles	(South Africa) Rik de Voest (Russia) Dmitry Tursunov; 4–6, 6–3, [10–5]	(Czech Republic) Martin Damm (Sweden) Robert Lindstedt	(France) Gilles Simon (France) Richard Gasquet	(Croatia) Marin Čilić (France) Fabrice Santoro (Russia) Igor Andreev (United Kingdom) Andy Murray
23 Feb	Abierto Mexicano Telcel; Acapulco, Mexico; ATP World Tour 500; Clay – $1,226,500 – 32S/16D; Singles – Doubles	(Spain) Nicolás Almagro; 6–4, 6–4	(France) Gaël Monfils	(Argentina) Martín Vassallo Argüello (Argentina) José Acasuso	(Austria) Daniel Köllerer (Spain) Daniel Gimeno Traver (Spain) Tommy Robredo (Argentina) Leonardo Mayer
23 Feb	Abierto Mexicano Telcel; Acapulco, Mexico; ATP World Tour 500; Clay – $1,226,500 – 32S/16D; Singles – Doubles	(Czech Republic) František Čermák (Slovakia) Michal Mertiňák; 4–6, 6–4, [10–7]	(Poland) Łukasz Kubot (Austria) Oliver Marach	(Argentina) Martín Vassallo Argüello (Argentina) José Acasuso	(Austria) Daniel Köllerer (Spain) Daniel Gimeno Traver (Spain) Tommy Robredo (Argentina) Leonardo Mayer
23 Feb	Delray Beach International Tennis Championships; Delray Beach, United States; ATP World Tour 250; Hard – $500,000 – 32S/16D; Singles – Doubles	(United States) Mardy Fish; 7–5, 6–3	(Russia) Evgeny Korolev	(France) Jérémy Chardy (Belgium) Christophe Rochus	(France) Florent Serra (Cyprus) Marcos Baghdatis (Spain) Guillermo García López (Austria) Stefan Koubek
23 Feb	Delray Beach International Tennis Championships; Delray Beach, United States; ATP World Tour 250; Hard – $500,000 – 32S/16D; Singles – Doubles	(United States) Bob Bryan (United States) Mike Bryan; 6–4, 6–4	(Brazil) Marcelo Melo (Brazil) André Sá	(France) Jérémy Chardy (Belgium) Christophe Rochus	(France) Florent Serra (Cyprus) Marcos Baghdatis (Spain) Guillermo García López (Austria) Stefan Koubek

=== March ===
Week	Tournament	Champions	Runners-up	Semifinalists	Quarterfinalists
2 Mar	Davis Cup First Round; Buenos Aires, Argentina – clay Ostrava, Czech Republic – carpet (i); Birmingham, United States – hard (i); Poreč, Croatia – Hard (i); Malmö, Sweden – carpet (i); Sibiu, Romania – carpet (i); Garmisch-Part., Germany – Hard (i); Benidorm, Spain – clay	First round winners Argentina 5–0; Czech Republic 3–2; United States 4–1; Croatia 5–0; Israel 3–2; Russia 4–1; Germany 3–2; Spain 4–1	First round losers Netherlands; France; Switzerland; Chile; Sweden; Romania; Austria; Serbia		
9 Mar; 16 Mar	BNP Paribas Open; Indian Wells, United States; ATP World Tour Masters 1000; Hard – $3,645,000 – 96S/48Q/32D; Singles – Doubles	(Spain) Rafael Nadal; 6–1, 6–2	(United Kingdom) Andy Murray	(United States) Andy Roddick (Switzerland) Roger Federer	(Argentina) Juan Martín del Potro (Serbia) Novak Djokovic (Croatia) Ivan Ljubičić (Spain) Fernando Verdasco
9 Mar; 16 Mar	BNP Paribas Open; Indian Wells, United States; ATP World Tour Masters 1000; Hard – $3,645,000 – 96S/48Q/32D; Singles – Doubles	(United States) Mardy Fish (United States) Andy Roddick; 3–6, 6–1, [14–12]	(Belarus) Max Mirnyi (Israel) Andy Ram	(United States) Andy Roddick (Switzerland) Roger Federer	(Argentina) Juan Martín del Potro (Serbia) Novak Djokovic (Croatia) Ivan Ljubičić (Spain) Fernando Verdasco
23 Mar; 30 Mar	Sony Ericsson Open; Key Biscayne, United States; ATP World Tour Masters 1000; Hard – $3,645,000 – 96S/48Q/32D; Singles – Doubles	(United Kingdom) Andy Murray; 6–2, 7–5	(Serbia) Novak Djokovic	(Argentina) Juan Martín del Potro (Switzerland) Roger Federer	(Spain) Rafael Nadal (Spain) Fernando Verdasco (France) Jo-Wilfried Tsonga (United States) Andy Roddick
23 Mar; 30 Mar	Sony Ericsson Open; Key Biscayne, United States; ATP World Tour Masters 1000; Hard – $3,645,000 – 96S/48Q/32D; Singles – Doubles	(Belarus) Max Mirnyi (Israel) Andy Ram; 6–7^{(4–7)}, 6–2, [10–7]	(Australia) Ashley Fisher (Australia) Stephen Huss	(Argentina) Juan Martín del Potro (Switzerland) Roger Federer	(Spain) Rafael Nadal (Spain) Fernando Verdasco (France) Jo-Wilfried Tsonga (United States) Andy Roddick

=== April ===
Week	Tournament	Champions	Runners-up	Semifinalists	Quarterfinalists
6 Apr	Grand Prix Hassan II; Casablanca, Morocco; ATP World Tour 250; Clay – €450,000 – 32S/28Q/16D; Singles – Doubles	(Spain) Juan Carlos Ferrero; 6–4, 7–5	(France) Florent Serra	(Russia) Igor Andreev (Spain) Albert Montañés	(France) Marc Gicquel (Romania) Victor Hănescu (Portugal) Frederico Gil (Russia) Teymuraz Gabashvili
6 Apr	Grand Prix Hassan II; Casablanca, Morocco; ATP World Tour 250; Clay – €450,000 – 32S/28Q/16D; Singles – Doubles	(Poland) Łukasz Kubot (Austria) Oliver Marach; 7–6^{(7–4)}, 3–6, [10–6]	(Sweden) Simon Aspelin (Australia) Paul Hanley	(Russia) Igor Andreev (Spain) Albert Montañés	(France) Marc Gicquel (Romania) Victor Hănescu (Portugal) Frederico Gil (Russia) Teymuraz Gabashvili
6 Apr	U.S. Men's Clay Court Championships; Houston, United States; ATP World Tour 250; Clay (maroon) – $500,000 – 32S/28Q/16D; Singles – Doubles	(Australia) Lleyton Hewitt; 6–2, 7–5	(United States) Wayne Odesnik	(Russia) Evgeny Korolev (Germany) Björn Phau	(Argentina) Guillermo Cañas (Spain) Guillermo García López (United States) John Isner (Germany) Tommy Haas
6 Apr	U.S. Men's Clay Court Championships; Houston, United States; ATP World Tour 250; Clay (maroon) – $500,000 – 32S/28Q/16D; Singles – Doubles	(United States) Bob Bryan (United States) Mike Bryan; 6–1, 6–2	(United States) Jesse Levine (United States) Ryan Sweeting	(Russia) Evgeny Korolev (Germany) Björn Phau	(Argentina) Guillermo Cañas (Spain) Guillermo García López (United States) John Isner (Germany) Tommy Haas
13 Apr	Monte-Carlo Rolex Masters; Roquebrune-Cap-Martin, France; ATP World Tour Masters 1000; Clay – €2,227,500 – 56S/28Q/24D; Singles – Doubles	(Spain) Rafael Nadal; 6–3, 2–6, 6–1	(Serbia) Novak Djokovic	(United Kingdom) Andy Murray (Switzerland) Stanislas Wawrinka	(Croatia) Ivan Ljubičić (Russia) Nikolay Davydenko (Spain) Fernando Verdasco (Germany) Andreas Beck
13 Apr	Monte-Carlo Rolex Masters; Roquebrune-Cap-Martin, France; ATP World Tour Masters 1000; Clay – €2,227,500 – 56S/28Q/24D; Singles – Doubles	(Canada) Daniel Nestor (Serbia) Nenad Zimonjić; 6–4, 6–1	(United States) Bob Bryan (United States) Mike Bryan	(United Kingdom) Andy Murray (Switzerland) Stanislas Wawrinka	(Croatia) Ivan Ljubičić (Russia) Nikolay Davydenko (Spain) Fernando Verdasco (Germany) Andreas Beck
20 Apr	Barcelona Open Banco Sabadell; Barcelona, Spain; ATP World Tour 500; Clay – €1,995,000 – 56S/28Q/24D; Singles – Doubles	(Spain) Rafael Nadal; 6–2, 7–5	(Spain) David Ferrer	(Russia) Nikolay Davydenko (Chile) Fernando González	(Argentina) David Nalbandian (Czech Republic) Radek Štěpánek (Spain) Tommy Robredo (Spain) Fernando Verdasco
20 Apr	Barcelona Open Banco Sabadell; Barcelona, Spain; ATP World Tour 500; Clay – €1,995,000 – 56S/28Q/24D; Singles – Doubles	(Canada) Daniel Nestor (Serbia) Nenad Zimonjić; 6–3, 7–6^{(11–9)}	(India) Mahesh Bhupathi (The Bahamas) Mark Knowles	(Russia) Nikolay Davydenko (Chile) Fernando González	(Argentina) David Nalbandian (Czech Republic) Radek Štěpánek (Spain) Tommy Robredo (Spain) Fernando Verdasco
27 Apr	Internazionali BNL d'Italia; Rome, Italy; ATP World Tour Masters 1000; Clay – €2,227,500 – 56S/28Q/24D; Singles – Doubles	(Spain) Rafael Nadal; 7–6^{(7–2)}, 6–2	(Serbia) Novak Djokovic	(Chile) Fernando González (Switzerland) Roger Federer	(Spain) Fernando Verdasco (Argentina) Juan Mónaco (Argentina) Juan Martín del Potro (Germany) Mischa Zverev
27 Apr	Internazionali BNL d'Italia; Rome, Italy; ATP World Tour Masters 1000; Clay – €2,227,500 – 56S/28Q/24D; Singles – Doubles	(Canada) Daniel Nestor (Serbia) Nenad Zimonjić; 7–6^{(7–5)}, 6–3	(United States) Bob Bryan (United States) Mike Bryan	(Chile) Fernando González (Switzerland) Roger Federer	(Spain) Fernando Verdasco (Argentina) Juan Mónaco (Argentina) Juan Martín del Potro (Germany) Mischa Zverev

=== May ===
Week	Tournament	Champions	Runners-up	Semifinalists	Quarterfinalists
4 May	Estoril Open; Oeiras, Portugal; ATP World Tour 250; Clay – €450,000 – 32S/16D; Singles – Doubles	(Spain) Albert Montañés; 5–7, 7–6^{(8–6)}, 6–0	(United States) James Blake	(Chile) Paul Capdeville (Russia) Nikolay Davydenko	(France) Gilles Simon (Spain) Óscar Hernández (France) Florent Serra (United States) Mardy Fish
4 May	Estoril Open; Oeiras, Portugal; ATP World Tour 250; Clay – €450,000 – 32S/16D; Singles – Doubles	(United States) Eric Butorac (United States) Scott Lipsky; 6–3, 6–2	(Czech Republic) Martin Damm (Sweden) Robert Lindstedt	(Chile) Paul Capdeville (Russia) Nikolay Davydenko	(France) Gilles Simon (Spain) Óscar Hernández (France) Florent Serra (United States) Mardy Fish
4 May	Serbia Open powered by Telekom Srbija; Belgrade, Serbia; ATP World Tour 250; Clay – €450,000 – 28S/16D; Singles – Doubles	(Serbia) Novak Djokovic; 6–3, 7–6^{(7–0)}	(Poland) Łukasz Kubot	(Italy) Andreas Seppi (Croatia) Ivo Karlović	(Serbia) Viktor Troicki (Brazil) Marcos Daniel (Belgium) Kristof Vliegen (Italy) Flavio Cipolla
4 May	Serbia Open powered by Telekom Srbija; Belgrade, Serbia; ATP World Tour 250; Clay – €450,000 – 28S/16D; Singles – Doubles	(Poland) Łukasz Kubot (Austria) Oliver Marach; 6–2, 7–6^{(7–3)}	(Sweden) Johan Brunström (Netherlands Antilles) Jean-Julien Rojer	(Italy) Andreas Seppi (Croatia) Ivo Karlović	(Serbia) Viktor Troicki (Brazil) Marcos Daniel (Belgium) Kristof Vliegen (Italy) Flavio Cipolla
4 May	BMW Open; Munich, Germany; ATP World Tour 250; Clay – €450,000 – 32S/16D; Singles – Doubles	(Czech Republic) Tomáš Berdych; 6–4, 4–6, 7–6^{(7–5)}	(Russia) Mikhail Youzhny	(Germany) Daniel Brands (France) Jérémy Chardy	(Italy) Potito Starace (France) Paul-Henri Mathieu (Australia) Lleyton Hewitt (Croatia) Marin Čilić
4 May	BMW Open; Munich, Germany; ATP World Tour 250; Clay – €450,000 – 32S/16D; Singles – Doubles	(Czech Republic) Jan Hernych (Czech Republic) Ivo Minář; 6–4, 6–4	(Australia) Ashley Fisher (Australia) Jordan Kerr	(Germany) Daniel Brands (France) Jérémy Chardy	(Italy) Potito Starace (France) Paul-Henri Mathieu (Australia) Lleyton Hewitt (Croatia) Marin Čilić
11 May	Mutua Madrileña Madrid Open; Madrid, Spain; ATP World Tour Masters 1000; Clay – €2,835,000 – 56S/24D; Singles – Doubles	(Switzerland) Roger Federer; 6–4, 6–4	(Spain) Rafael Nadal	(Serbia) Novak Djokovic (Argentina) Juan Martín del Potro	(Spain) Fernando Verdasco (Croatia) Ivan Ljubičić (United Kingdom) Andy Murray (United States) Andy Roddick
11 May	Mutua Madrileña Madrid Open; Madrid, Spain; ATP World Tour Masters 1000; Clay – €2,835,000 – 56S/24D; Singles – Doubles	(Canada) Daniel Nestor (Serbia) Nenad Zimonjić; 6–4, 6–4	(Sweden) Simon Aspelin (South Africa) Wesley Moodie	(Serbia) Novak Djokovic (Argentina) Juan Martín del Potro	(Spain) Fernando Verdasco (Croatia) Ivan Ljubičić (United Kingdom) Andy Murray (United States) Andy Roddick
18 May	Interwetten Austrian Open Kitzbühel; Kitzbühel, Austria; ATP World Tour 250; Clay – €450,000 – 32S/16D; Singles – Doubles	(Spain) Guillermo García López; 3–6, 7–6^{(7–1)}, 6–3	(France) Julien Benneteau	(Spain) Óscar Hernández (Russia) Mikhail Youzhny	(Austria) Daniel Köllerer (Argentina) Juan Ignacio Chela (Romania) Victor Hănescu (Austria) Jürgen Melzer
18 May	Interwetten Austrian Open Kitzbühel; Kitzbühel, Austria; ATP World Tour 250; Clay – €450,000 – 32S/16D; Singles – Doubles	(Brazil) Marcelo Melo (Brazil) André Sá; 6–7^{(9–11)}, 6–2, [10–7]	(Romania) Andrei Pavel (Romania) Horia Tecău	(Spain) Óscar Hernández (Russia) Mikhail Youzhny	(Austria) Daniel Köllerer (Argentina) Juan Ignacio Chela (Romania) Victor Hănescu (Austria) Jürgen Melzer
18 May	ARAG ATP World Team Championship; Düsseldorf, Germany; ATP World Team Championship; Clay – €1,351,000 – 8 teams (RR)	Serbia; 2–1	Germany	Round Robin (Blue Group) Argentina; Italy; Russia	Round Robin (Red Group) Sweden; United States; France
25 May; 1 Jun	French Open; Paris, France; Grand Slam; Clay – €7,322,320; 128S/64D/32X; Singles – Doubles – Mixed doubles	(Switzerland) Roger Federer; 6–1, 7–6^{(7–1)}, 6–4	(Sweden) Robin Söderling	(Chile) Fernando González (Argentina) Juan Martín del Potro	(Russia) Nikolay Davydenko (United Kingdom) Andy Murray (Spain) Tommy Robredo (France) Gaël Monfils
25 May; 1 Jun	French Open; Paris, France; Grand Slam; Clay – €7,322,320; 128S/64D/32X; Singles – Doubles – Mixed doubles	(Czech Republic) Lukáš Dlouhý (India) Leander Paes; 3–6, 6–3, 6–2	(South Africa) Wesley Moodie (Belgium) Dick Norman	(Chile) Fernando González (Argentina) Juan Martín del Potro	(Russia) Nikolay Davydenko (United Kingdom) Andy Murray (Spain) Tommy Robredo (France) Gaël Monfils
25 May; 1 Jun	French Open; Paris, France; Grand Slam; Clay – €7,322,320; 128S/64D/32X; Singles – Doubles – Mixed doubles	(United States) Bob Bryan (United States) Liezel Huber; 5–7, 7–6^{(7–5)}, 10–7	(Brazil) Marcelo Melo (United States) Vania King	(Chile) Fernando González (Argentina) Juan Martín del Potro	(Russia) Nikolay Davydenko (United Kingdom) Andy Murray (Spain) Tommy Robredo (France) Gaël Monfils

=== June ===
Week	Tournament	Champions	Runners-up	Semifinalists	Quarterfinalists
8 Jun	Aegon Championships; London, United Kingdom; ATP World Tour 250; Grass – €750,000 – 56S/24D; Singles – Doubles	(United Kingdom) Andy Murray; 7–5, 6–4	(United States) James Blake	(Spain) Juan Carlos Ferrero (United States) Andy Roddick	(United States) Mardy Fish (Belgium) Steve Darcis (Russia) Mikhail Youzhny (Croatia) Ivo Karlović
8 Jun	Aegon Championships; London, United Kingdom; ATP World Tour 250; Grass – €750,000 – 56S/24D; Singles – Doubles	(South Africa) Wesley Moodie (Russia) Mikhail Youzhny; 6–4, 4–6, [10–6]	(Brazil) Marcelo Melo (Brazil) André Sá	(Spain) Juan Carlos Ferrero (United States) Andy Roddick	(United States) Mardy Fish (Belgium) Steve Darcis (Russia) Mikhail Youzhny (Croatia) Ivo Karlović
8 Jun	Gerry Weber Open; Halle, Germany; ATP World Tour 250; Grass – €750,000 – 32S/16D; Singles – Doubles	(Germany) Tommy Haas; 6–3, 6–7^{(4–7)}, 6–1	(Serbia) Novak Djokovic	(Germany) Philipp Kohlschreiber (Belgium) Olivier Rochus	(Germany) Andreas Beck (Germany) Mischa Zverev (Germany) Benjamin Becker (Austria) Jürgen Melzer
8 Jun	Gerry Weber Open; Halle, Germany; ATP World Tour 250; Grass – €750,000 – 32S/16D; Singles – Doubles	(Germany) Christopher Kas (Germany) Philipp Kohlschreiber; 6–3, 6–4	(Germany) Andreas Beck (Switzerland) Marco Chiudinelli	(Germany) Philipp Kohlschreiber (Belgium) Olivier Rochus	(Germany) Andreas Beck (Germany) Mischa Zverev (Germany) Benjamin Becker (Austria) Jürgen Melzer
15 Jun	Ordina Open 's-Hertogenbosch, Netherlands; ATP World Tour 250; Grass – €450,000 – 32S/29Q/16D; Singles – Doubles	(Germany) Benjamin Becker; 7–5, 6–3	(Netherlands) Raemon Sluiter	(Germany) Rainer Schüttler (Spain) Iván Navarro	(France) Michaël Llodra (France) Jérémy Chardy (Spain) David Ferrer (Israel) Dudi Sela
15 Jun	Ordina Open 's-Hertogenbosch, Netherlands; ATP World Tour 250; Grass – €450,000 – 32S/29Q/16D; Singles – Doubles	(South Africa) Wesley Moodie (Belgium) Dick Norman; 7–6^{(7–3)}, 6–7^{(8–10)}, [10–5]	(Sweden) Johan Brunström (Netherlands Antilles) Jean-Julien Rojer	(Germany) Rainer Schüttler (Spain) Iván Navarro	(France) Michaël Llodra (France) Jérémy Chardy (Spain) David Ferrer (Israel) Dudi Sela
15 Jun	Aegon International; Eastbourne, United Kingdom; ATP World Tour 250; Grass – €450,000 – 32S/23Q/16D; Singles – Doubles	(Russia) Dmitry Tursunov; 6–3, 7–6^{(7–5)}	(Canada) Frank Dancevic	(France) Fabrice Santoro (Spain) Guillermo García López	(Argentina) Leonardo Mayer (Croatia) Ivan Ljubičić (Serbia) Janko Tipsarević (Uzbekistan) Denis Istomin
15 Jun	Aegon International; Eastbourne, United Kingdom; ATP World Tour 250; Grass – €450,000 – 32S/23Q/16D; Singles – Doubles	(Poland) Mariusz Fyrstenberg (Poland) Marcin Matkowski; 6–4, 6–4	(United States) Travis Parrott (Slovakia) Filip Polášek	(France) Fabrice Santoro (Spain) Guillermo García López	(Argentina) Leonardo Mayer (Croatia) Ivan Ljubičić (Serbia) Janko Tipsarević (Uzbekistan) Denis Istomin
22 Jun; 29 Jun	The Championships, Wimbledon; London, United Kingdom; Grand Slam; Grass – £5,616,600; 128S/128Q/64D/48X; Singles – Doubles – Mixed doubles	(Switzerland) Roger Federer; 5–7, 7–6^{(8–6)}, 7–6^{(7–5)}, 3–6, 16–14	(United States) Andy Roddick	(United Kingdom) Andy Murray (Germany) Tommy Haas	(Australia) Lleyton Hewitt (Spain) Juan Carlos Ferrero (Serbia) Novak Djokovic (Croatia) Ivo Karlović
22 Jun; 29 Jun	The Championships, Wimbledon; London, United Kingdom; Grand Slam; Grass – £5,616,600; 128S/128Q/64D/48X; Singles – Doubles – Mixed doubles	(Canada) Daniel Nestor (Serbia) Nenad Zimonjić; 7–6^{(9–7)}, 6–7^{(3–7)}, 7–6^{(7–3)}, 6–3	(United States) Bob Bryan (United States) Mike Bryan	(United Kingdom) Andy Murray (Germany) Tommy Haas	(Australia) Lleyton Hewitt (Spain) Juan Carlos Ferrero (Serbia) Novak Djokovic (Croatia) Ivo Karlović
22 Jun; 29 Jun	The Championships, Wimbledon; London, United Kingdom; Grand Slam; Grass – £5,616,600; 128S/128Q/64D/48X; Singles – Doubles – Mixed doubles	(The Bahamas) Mark Knowles (Germany) Anna-Lena Grönefeld; 7–5, 6–3	(India) Leander Paes (Zimbabwe) Cara Black	(United Kingdom) Andy Murray (Germany) Tommy Haas	(Australia) Lleyton Hewitt (Spain) Juan Carlos Ferrero (Serbia) Novak Djokovic (Croatia) Ivo Karlović

=== July ===
Week	Tournament	Champions	Runners-up	Semifinalists	Quarterfinalists
6 Jul	Campbell's Hall of Fame Tennis Championships; Newport, United States; ATP World Tour 250; Grass – $500,000 – 32S/26Q/16D; Singles – Doubles	(United States) Rajeev Ram; 6–7^{(3–7)}, 7–5, 6–3	(United States) Sam Querrey	(Belgium) Olivier Rochus (France) Fabrice Santoro	(United States) Jesse Levine (United States) Brendan Evans (United States) Kevin Kim (France) Nicolas Mahut
6 Jul	Campbell's Hall of Fame Tennis Championships; Newport, United States; ATP World Tour 250; Grass – $500,000 – 32S/26Q/16D; Singles – Doubles	(Australia) Jordan Kerr (United States) Rajeev Ram; 6–7^{(6–8)}, 7–6^{(9–7)}, [10–6]	(Germany) Michael Kohlmann (Netherlands) Rogier Wassen	(Belgium) Olivier Rochus (France) Fabrice Santoro	(United States) Jesse Levine (United States) Brendan Evans (United States) Kevin Kim (France) Nicolas Mahut
6 Jul	Davis Cup Quarterfinals; Ostrava, Czech Republic – Hard (i); Poreč, Croatia – clay (i); Tel Aviv, Israel – Hard (i); Marbella, Spain – clay	Quarterfinals winners Czech Republic 3–2; Croatia 3–2; Israel 4–1; Spain 3–2	Quarterfinals losers Argentina; United States; Russia; Germany		
13 Jul	Catella Swedish Open; Båstad, Sweden; ATP World Tour 250; Clay – €450,000 – 28S/29Q/16D; Singles – Doubles	(Sweden) Robin Söderling; 6–3, 7–6^{(7–4)}	(Argentina) Juan Mónaco	(Spain) Tommy Robredo (Sweden) Andreas Vinciguerra	(Spain) Fernando Verdasco (Russia) Teymuraz Gabashvili (Austria) Jürgen Melzer (Spain) Nicolás Almagro
13 Jul	Catella Swedish Open; Båstad, Sweden; ATP World Tour 250; Clay – €450,000 – 28S/29Q/16D; Singles – Doubles	(Czech Republic) Jaroslav Levinský (Slovakia) Filip Polášek; 1–6, 6–3, [10–7]	(Sweden) Robert Lindstedt (Sweden) Robin Söderling	(Spain) Tommy Robredo (Sweden) Andreas Vinciguerra	(Spain) Fernando Verdasco (Russia) Teymuraz Gabashvili (Austria) Jürgen Melzer (Spain) Nicolás Almagro
13 Jul	MercedesCup; Stuttgart, Germany; ATP World Tour 250; Clay – €450,000 – 32S/18Q/16D; Singles – Doubles	(France) Jérémy Chardy; 1–6, 6–3, 6–4	(Romania) Victor Hănescu	(Germany) Nicolas Kiefer (Italy) Fabio Fognini	(Germany) Mischa Zverev (Poland) Łukasz Kubot (France) Alexandre Sidorenko (Russia) Nikolay Davydenko
13 Jul	MercedesCup; Stuttgart, Germany; ATP World Tour 250; Clay – €450,000 – 32S/18Q/16D; Singles – Doubles	(Czech Republic) František Čermák (Slovakia) Michal Mertiňák; 7–5, 6–4	(Romania) Victor Hănescu (Romania) Horia Tecău	(Germany) Nicolas Kiefer (Italy) Fabio Fognini	(Germany) Mischa Zverev (Poland) Łukasz Kubot (France) Alexandre Sidorenko (Russia) Nikolay Davydenko
20 Jul	International German Open; Hamburg, Germany; ATP World Tour 500; Clay – €1,115,000 – 48S/22Q/16D; Singles – Doubles	(Russia) Nikolay Davydenko; 6–4, 6–2	(France) Paul-Henri Mathieu	(Uruguay) Pablo Cuevas (Spain) David Ferrer	(Serbia) Viktor Troicki (Spain) Nicolás Almagro (Germany) Simon Greul (Romania) Victor Hănescu
20 Jul	International German Open; Hamburg, Germany; ATP World Tour 500; Clay – €1,115,000 – 48S/22Q/16D; Singles – Doubles	(Sweden) Simon Aspelin (Australia) Paul Hanley; 6–3, 6–3	(Brazil) Marcelo Melo (Slovakia) Filip Polášek	(Uruguay) Pablo Cuevas (Spain) David Ferrer	(Serbia) Viktor Troicki (Spain) Nicolás Almagro (Germany) Simon Greul (Romania) Victor Hănescu
20 Jul	Indianapolis Tennis Championships; Indianapolis, United States; ATP World Tour 250; Hard – $600,000 – 32S/26Q/16D; Singles – Doubles	(United States) Robby Ginepri; 6–2, 6–4	(United States) Sam Querrey	(Canada) Frank Dancevic (United States) John Isner	(Russia) Dmitry Tursunov (France) Marc Gicquel (United States) Wayne Odesnik (United States) Alex Bogomolov Jr.
20 Jul	Indianapolis Tennis Championships; Indianapolis, United States; ATP World Tour 250; Hard – $600,000 – 32S/26Q/16D; Singles – Doubles	(Latvia) Ernests Gulbis (Russia) Dmitry Tursunov; 6–4, 3–6, [11–9]	(Australia) Ashley Fisher (Australia) Jordan Kerr	(Canada) Frank Dancevic (United States) John Isner	(Russia) Dmitry Tursunov (France) Marc Gicquel (United States) Wayne Odesnik (United States) Alex Bogomolov Jr.
27 Jul	Allianz Suisse Open Gstaad; Gstaad, Switzerland; ATP World Tour 250; Clay – €450,000 – 32S/16D; Singles – Doubles	(Brazil) Thomaz Bellucci; 6–4, 7–6^{(7–2)}	(Germany) Andreas Beck	(Russia) Igor Andreev (Brazil) Marcos Daniel	(Germany) Nicolas Kiefer (France) Jérémy Chardy (France) Florent Serra (Romania) Victor Crivoi
27 Jul	Allianz Suisse Open Gstaad; Gstaad, Switzerland; ATP World Tour 250; Clay – €450,000 – 32S/16D; Singles – Doubles	(Switzerland) Marco Chiudinelli (Switzerland) Michael Lammer; 7–5, 6–3	(Czech Republic) Jaroslav Levinský (Slovakia) Filip Polášek	(Russia) Igor Andreev (Brazil) Marcos Daniel	(Germany) Nicolas Kiefer (France) Jérémy Chardy (France) Florent Serra (Romania) Victor Crivoi
27 Jul	ATP Studena Croatia Open Umag; Umag, Croatia; ATP World Tour 250; Clay – €450,000 – 32S/26Q/16D; Singles – Doubles	(Russia) Nikolay Davydenko; 6–3, 6–0	(Spain) Juan Carlos Ferrero	(Austria) Jürgen Melzer (Italy) Andreas Seppi	(Italy) Simone Bolelli (Croatia) Ivan Ljubičić (Argentina) Máximo González (Chile) Nicolás Massú
27 Jul	ATP Studena Croatia Open Umag; Umag, Croatia; ATP World Tour 250; Clay – €450,000 – 32S/26Q/16D; Singles – Doubles	(Czech Republic) František Čermák (Slovakia) Michal Mertiňák; 6–4, 6–4	(Sweden) Johan Brunström (Netherlands Antilles) Jean-Julien Rojer	(Austria) Jürgen Melzer (Italy) Andreas Seppi	(Italy) Simone Bolelli (Croatia) Ivan Ljubičić (Argentina) Máximo González (Chile) Nicolás Massú
27 Jul	LA Tennis Open; Los Angeles, United States; ATP World Tour 250; Hard – $700,000 – 28S/16D; Singles – Doubles	(United States) Sam Querrey; 6–4, 3–6, 6–1	(Australia) Carsten Ball	(Germany) Tommy Haas (Argentina) Leonardo Mayer	(Russia) Marat Safin (Israel) Dudi Sela (United States) John Isner (United States) Mardy Fish
27 Jul	LA Tennis Open; Los Angeles, United States; ATP World Tour 250; Hard – $700,000 – 28S/16D; Singles – Doubles	(United States) Bob Bryan (United States) Mike Bryan; 6–4, 7–6^{(7–2)}	(Germany) Benjamin Becker (Germany) Frank Moser	(Germany) Tommy Haas (Argentina) Leonardo Mayer	(Russia) Marat Safin (Israel) Dudi Sela (United States) John Isner (United States) Mardy Fish

=== August ===
Week	Tournament	Champions	Runners-up	Semifinalists	Quarterfinalists
3 Aug	Legg Mason Tennis Classic; Washington, D.C., United States; ATP World Tour 500; Hard – $1,402,000 – 48S/16D; Singles – Doubles	(Argentina) Juan Martín del Potro; 3–6, 7–5, 7–6^{(8–6)}	(United States) Andy Roddick	(United States) John Isner (Chile) Fernando González	(Croatia) Ivo Karlović (Czech Republic) Tomáš Berdych (Germany) Tommy Haas (Sweden) Robin Söderling
3 Aug	Legg Mason Tennis Classic; Washington, D.C., United States; ATP World Tour 500; Hard – $1,402,000 – 48S/16D; Singles – Doubles	(Czech Republic) Martin Damm (Sweden) Robert Lindstedt; 7–5, 7–6^{(7–3)}	(Poland) Mariusz Fyrstenberg (Poland) Marcin Matkowski	(United States) John Isner (Chile) Fernando González	(Croatia) Ivo Karlović (Czech Republic) Tomáš Berdych (Germany) Tommy Haas (Sweden) Robin Söderling
10 Aug	Rogers Cup; Montreal, Canada; ATP World Tour Masters 1000; Hard – $2,430,000 – 56S/28Q/24D; Singles – Doubles	(United Kingdom) Andy Murray; 6–7^{(4–7)}, 7–6^{(7–3)}, 6–1	(Argentina) Juan Martín del Potro	(France) Jo-Wilfried Tsonga (United States) Andy Roddick	(Switzerland) Roger Federer (Russia) Nikolay Davydenko (Serbia) Novak Djokovic (Spain) Rafael Nadal
10 Aug	Rogers Cup; Montreal, Canada; ATP World Tour Masters 1000; Hard – $2,430,000 – 56S/28Q/24D; Singles – Doubles	(India) Mahesh Bhupathi (The Bahamas) Mark Knowles; 6–4, 6–3	(Belarus) Max Mirnyi (Israel) Andy Ram	(France) Jo-Wilfried Tsonga (United States) Andy Roddick	(Switzerland) Roger Federer (Russia) Nikolay Davydenko (Serbia) Novak Djokovic (Spain) Rafael Nadal
17 Aug	Western & Southern Financial Group Masters; Mason, United States; ATP World Tour Masters 1000; Hard – $2,430,000 – 56S/28Q/24D; Singles – Doubles	(Switzerland) Roger Federer; 6–1, 7–5	(Serbia) Novak Djokovic	(United Kingdom) Andy Murray (Spain) Rafael Nadal	(Australia) Lleyton Hewitt (France) Julien Benneteau (France) Gilles Simon (Czech Republic) Tomáš Berdych
17 Aug	Western & Southern Financial Group Masters; Mason, United States; ATP World Tour Masters 1000; Hard – $2,430,000 – 56S/28Q/24D; Singles – Doubles	(Canada) Daniel Nestor (Serbia) Nenad Zimonjić; 3–6, 7–6^{(7–2)}, [15–13]	(United States) Bob Bryan (United States) Mike Bryan	(United Kingdom) Andy Murray (Spain) Rafael Nadal	(Australia) Lleyton Hewitt (France) Julien Benneteau (France) Gilles Simon (Czech Republic) Tomáš Berdych
24 Aug	Pilot Pen Tennis; New Haven, United States; ATP World Tour 250; Hard – $750,000 – 48S/16D; Singles – Doubles	(Spain) Fernando Verdasco; 6–4, 7–6^{(8–6)}	(United States) Sam Querrey	(Argentina) José Acasuso (Russia) Igor Andreev	(Russia) Nikolay Davydenko (France) Florent Serra (Argentina) Leonardo Mayer (Austria) Jürgen Melzer
24 Aug	Pilot Pen Tennis; New Haven, United States; ATP World Tour 250; Hard – $750,000 – 48S/16D; Singles – Doubles	(Austria) Julian Knowle (Austria) Jürgen Melzer; 6–4, 7–6^{(7–3)}	(Brazil) Bruno Soares (Zimbabwe) Kevin Ullyett	(Argentina) José Acasuso (Russia) Igor Andreev	(Russia) Nikolay Davydenko (France) Florent Serra (Argentina) Leonardo Mayer (Austria) Jürgen Melzer
31 Aug; 7 Sep	US Open; New York City, United States; Grand Slam; Hard – $9,756,000; 128S/128Q/64D/32X; Singles – Doubles – Mixed doubles	(Argentina) Juan Martín del Potro; 3–6, 7–6^{(7–5)}, 4–6, 7–6^{(7–4)}, 6–2	(Switzerland) Roger Federer	(Serbia) Novak Djokovic (Spain) Rafael Nadal	(Sweden) Robin Söderling (Spain) Fernando Verdasco (Chile) Fernando González (Croatia) Marin Čilić
31 Aug; 7 Sep	US Open; New York City, United States; Grand Slam; Hard – $9,756,000; 128S/128Q/64D/32X; Singles – Doubles – Mixed doubles	(Czech Republic) Lukáš Dlouhý (India) Leander Paes; 3–6, 6–3 6–2	(India) Mahesh Bhupathi (The Bahamas) Mark Knowles	(Serbia) Novak Djokovic (Spain) Rafael Nadal	(Sweden) Robin Söderling (Spain) Fernando Verdasco (Chile) Fernando González (Croatia) Marin Čilić
31 Aug; 7 Sep	US Open; New York City, United States; Grand Slam; Hard – $9,756,000; 128S/128Q/64D/32X; Singles – Doubles – Mixed doubles	(United States) Travis Parrott (United States) Carly Gullickson; 6–2, 6–4	(India) Leander Paes (Zimbabwe) Cara Black	(Serbia) Novak Djokovic (Spain) Rafael Nadal	(Sweden) Robin Söderling (Spain) Fernando Verdasco (Chile) Fernando González (Croatia) Marin Čilić

=== September ===
Week	Tournament	Champions	Runners-up	Semifinalists	Quarterfinalists
14 Sep	Davis Cup Semifinals; Poreč, Croatia – clay (i); Murcia, Spain – clay	Semifinals winners Czech Republic 4–1; Spain 4–1	Semifinals losers Croatia; Israel		
21 Sep	BCR Open Romania; Bucharest, Romania; ATP World Tour 250; Clay – €450,000 – 32S/16D; Singles – Doubles	(Spain) Albert Montañés; 7–6^{(7–2)}, 7–6^{(8–6)}	(Argentina) Juan Mónaco	(Germany) Simon Greul (Spain) Santiago Ventura	(Argentina) Máximo González (Uruguay) Pablo Cuevas (Spain) Rubén Ramírez Hidalgo (Italy) Fabio Fognini
21 Sep	BCR Open Romania; Bucharest, Romania; ATP World Tour 250; Clay – €450,000 – 32S/16D; Singles – Doubles	(Czech Republic) František Čermák (Slovakia) Michal Mertiňák; 6–2, 6–4	(Sweden) Johan Brunström (Netherlands Antilles) Jean-Julien Rojer	(Germany) Simon Greul (Spain) Santiago Ventura	(Argentina) Máximo González (Uruguay) Pablo Cuevas (Spain) Rubén Ramírez Hidalgo (Italy) Fabio Fognini
21 Sep	Open de Moselle; Metz, France; ATP World Tour 250; Hard (i) – €450,000 – 28S/21Q/16D; Singles – Doubles	(France) Gaël Monfils; 7–6^{(7–1)}, 3–6, 6–2	(Germany) Philipp Kohlschreiber	(France) Richard Gasquet (France) Paul-Henri Mathieu	(Serbia) Janko Tipsarević (Germany) Philipp Petzschner (Germany) Andreas Beck (Russia) Evgeny Korolev
21 Sep	Open de Moselle; Metz, France; ATP World Tour 250; Hard (i) – €450,000 – 28S/21Q/16D; Singles – Doubles	(United Kingdom) Colin Fleming (United Kingdom) Ken Skupski; 2–6, 6–4, [10–5]	(France) Arnaud Clément (France) Michaël Llodra	(France) Richard Gasquet (France) Paul-Henri Mathieu	(Serbia) Janko Tipsarević (Germany) Philipp Petzschner (Germany) Andreas Beck (Russia) Evgeny Korolev
28 Sep	PTT Thailand Open; Bangkok, Thailand; ATP World Tour 250; Hard (i) – $608,500 – 28S/16D; Singles – Doubles	(France) Gilles Simon; 7–5, 6–3	(Serbia) Viktor Troicki	(France) Jo-Wilfried Tsonga (Austria) Jürgen Melzer	(Switzerland) Marco Chiudinelli (United States) John Isner (Germany) Andreas Beck (Russia) Evgeny Korolev
28 Sep	PTT Thailand Open; Bangkok, Thailand; ATP World Tour 250; Hard (i) – $608,500 – 28S/16D; Singles – Doubles	(United States) Eric Butorac (United States) Rajeev Ram; 7–6^{(7–4)}, 6–3	(Spain) Guillermo García López (Germany) Mischa Zverev	(France) Jo-Wilfried Tsonga (Austria) Jürgen Melzer	(Switzerland) Marco Chiudinelli (United States) John Isner (Germany) Andreas Beck (Russia) Evgeny Korolev
28 Sep	Proton Malaysian Open; Kuala Lumpur, Malaysia; ATP World Tour 250; Hard (i) – $850,000 – 28S/32S/16D; Singles – Doubles	(Russia) Nikolay Davydenko; 6–4, 7–5	(Spain) Fernando Verdasco	(Sweden) Robin Söderling (Chile) Fernando González	(France) Gaël Monfils (Czech Republic) Tomáš Berdych (Russia) Mikhail Youzhny (France) Richard Gasquet
28 Sep	Proton Malaysian Open; Kuala Lumpur, Malaysia; ATP World Tour 250; Hard (i) – $850,000 – 28S/32S/16D; Singles – Doubles	(Poland) Mariusz Fyrstenberg (Poland) Marcin Matkowski; 6–2, 6–1	(Russia) Igor Kunitsyn (Czech Republic) Jaroslav Levinský	(Sweden) Robin Söderling (Chile) Fernando González	(France) Gaël Monfils (Czech Republic) Tomáš Berdych (Russia) Mikhail Youzhny (France) Richard Gasquet

=== October ===
Week	Tournament	Champions	Runners-up	Semifinalists	Quarterfinalists
5 Oct	China Open; Beijing, China; ATP World Tour 500; Hard – $2,100,600 – 32S/16D; Singles – Doubles	(Serbia) Novak Djokovic; 6–2, 7–6^{(7–4)}	(Croatia) Marin Čilić	(Spain) Rafael Nadal (Sweden) Robin Söderling	(Russia) Marat Safin (Russia) Nikolay Davydenko (Croatia) Ivan Ljubičić (Spain) Fernando Verdasco
5 Oct	China Open; Beijing, China; ATP World Tour 500; Hard – $2,100,600 – 32S/16D; Singles – Doubles	(United States) Bob Bryan (United States) Mike Bryan; 6–4, 6–2	(The Bahamas) Mark Knowles (United States) Andy Roddick	(Spain) Rafael Nadal (Sweden) Robin Söderling	(Russia) Marat Safin (Russia) Nikolay Davydenko (Croatia) Ivan Ljubičić (Spain) Fernando Verdasco
5 Oct	Rakuten Japan Open Tennis Championships; Tokyo, Japan; ATP World Tour 500; Hard – $1,226,600 – 32S/16D; Singles – Doubles	(France) Jo-Wilfried Tsonga; 6–3, 6–3	(Russia) Mikhail Youzhny	(Australia) Lleyton Hewitt (France) Gaël Monfils	(France) Édouard Roger-Vasselin (Czech Republic) Tomáš Berdych (Switzerland) Stanislas Wawrinka (Latvia) Ernests Gulbis
5 Oct	Rakuten Japan Open Tennis Championships; Tokyo, Japan; ATP World Tour 500; Hard – $1,226,600 – 32S/16D; Singles – Doubles	(Austria) Julian Knowle (Austria) Jürgen Melzer; 6–2, 5–7, [10–8]	(United Kingdom) Ross Hutchins (Australia) Jordan Kerr	(Australia) Lleyton Hewitt (France) Gaël Monfils	(France) Édouard Roger-Vasselin (Czech Republic) Tomáš Berdych (Switzerland) Stanislas Wawrinka (Latvia) Ernests Gulbis
12 Oct	Shanghai ATP Masters 1000 p/b Rolex; Shanghai, China; ATP World Tour Masters 1000; Hard – $3,240,000 – 56S/28Q/24D; Singles – Doubles	(Russia) Nikolay Davydenko; 7–6^{(7–3)}, 6–3	(Spain) Rafael Nadal	(Spain) Feliciano López (Serbia) Novak Djokovic	(Croatia) Ivan Ljubičić (Sweden) Robin Söderling (Czech Republic) Radek Štěpánek (France) Gilles Simon
12 Oct	Shanghai ATP Masters 1000 p/b Rolex; Shanghai, China; ATP World Tour Masters 1000; Hard – $3,240,000 – 56S/28Q/24D; Singles – Doubles	(France) Julien Benneteau (France) Jo-Wilfried Tsonga; 6–2, 6–4	(Poland) Mariusz Fyrstenberg (Poland) Marcin Matkowski	(Spain) Feliciano López (Serbia) Novak Djokovic	(Croatia) Ivan Ljubičić (Sweden) Robin Söderling (Czech Republic) Radek Štěpánek (France) Gilles Simon
19 Oct	If Stockholm Open; Stockholm, Sweden; ATP World Tour 250; Hard (i) – €600,000 – 32S/16D; Singles – Doubles	(Cyprus) Marcos Baghdatis; 6–1, 7–5	(Belgium) Olivier Rochus	(Sweden) Robin Söderling (Brazil) Thomaz Bellucci	(Spain) Guillermo García López (France) Arnaud Clément (Sweden) Joachim Johansson (Finland) Jarkko Nieminen
19 Oct	If Stockholm Open; Stockholm, Sweden; ATP World Tour 250; Hard (i) – €600,000 – 32S/16D; Singles – Doubles	(Brazil) Bruno Soares (Zimbabwe) Kevin Ullyett; 6–4, 7–6^{(7–4)}	(Sweden) Simon Aspelin (Australia) Paul Hanley	(Sweden) Robin Söderling (Brazil) Thomaz Bellucci	(Spain) Guillermo García López (France) Arnaud Clément (Sweden) Joachim Johansson (Finland) Jarkko Nieminen
19 Oct	Kremlin Cup; Moscow, Russia; ATP World Tour 250; Hard (i) – $1,080,500 – 32S/16D; Singles – Doubles	(Russia) Mikhail Youzhny; 6–7^{(5–7)}, 6–0, 6–4	(Serbia) Janko Tipsarević	(Ukraine) Illya Marchenko (Kazakhstan) Mikhail Kukushkin	(Russia) Evgeny Korolev (United States) Robby Ginepri (Ukraine) Sergiy Stakhovsky (Uruguay) Pablo Cuevas
19 Oct	Kremlin Cup; Moscow, Russia; ATP World Tour 250; Hard (i) – $1,080,500 – 32S/16D; Singles – Doubles	(Uruguay) Pablo Cuevas (Spain) Marcel Granollers; 4–6, 7–5, [10–8]	(Czech Republic) František Čermák (Slovakia) Michal Mertiňák	(Ukraine) Illya Marchenko (Kazakhstan) Mikhail Kukushkin	(Russia) Evgeny Korolev (United States) Robby Ginepri (Ukraine) Sergiy Stakhovsky (Uruguay) Pablo Cuevas
26 Oct	St. Petersburg Open; Saint Petersburg, Russia; ATP World Tour 250; Hard (i) – $750,000 – 32S/16D; Singles – Doubles	(Ukraine) Sergiy Stakhovsky; 2–6, 7–6^{(10–8)}, 7–6^{(9–7)}	(Argentina) Horacio Zeballos	(Russia) Marat Safin (Russia) Igor Kunitsyn	(Uzbekistan) Denis Istomin (Germany) Björn Phau (Latvia) Ernests Gulbis (Romania) Victor Hănescu
26 Oct	St. Petersburg Open; Saint Petersburg, Russia; ATP World Tour 250; Hard (i) – $750,000 – 32S/16D; Singles – Doubles	(United Kingdom) Colin Fleming (United Kingdom) Ken Skupski; 2–6, 7–5, [10–4]	(France) Jérémy Chardy (France) Richard Gasquet	(Russia) Marat Safin (Russia) Igor Kunitsyn	(Uzbekistan) Denis Istomin (Germany) Björn Phau (Latvia) Ernests Gulbis (Romania) Victor Hănescu
26 Oct	Grand Prix de Tennis de Lyon; Lyon, France; ATP World Tour 250; Hard (i) – €766,750 – 32S/16D; Singles – Doubles	(Croatia) Ivan Ljubičić; 7–5, 6–3	(France) Michaël Llodra	(France) Arnaud Clément (France) Gilles Simon	(France) Jo-Wilfried Tsonga (France) Florent Serra (France) Marc Gicquel (France) Julien Benneteau
26 Oct	Grand Prix de Tennis de Lyon; Lyon, France; ATP World Tour 250; Hard (i) – €766,750 – 32S/16D; Singles – Doubles	(France) Julien Benneteau (France) Nicolas Mahut; 6–4, 7–6^{(10–8)}	(France) Arnaud Clément (France) Sébastien Grosjean	(France) Arnaud Clément (France) Gilles Simon	(France) Jo-Wilfried Tsonga (France) Florent Serra (France) Marc Gicquel (France) Julien Benneteau
26 Oct	Bank Austria-TennisTrophy; Vienna, Austria; ATP World Tour 250; Hard (i) – €650,000 – 32S/16D; Singles – Doubles	(Austria) Jürgen Melzer; 6–4, 6–3	(Croatia) Marin Čilić	(Germany) Philipp Kohlschreiber (Serbia) Janko Tipsarević	(Spain) Feliciano López (Spain) Nicolás Almagro (France) Gaël Monfils (Czech Republic) Radek Štěpánek
26 Oct	Bank Austria-TennisTrophy; Vienna, Austria; ATP World Tour 250; Hard (i) – €650,000 – 32S/16D; Singles – Doubles	(Poland) Łukasz Kubot (Austria) Oliver Marach; 2–6, 6–4, [11–9]	(Austria) Julian Knowle (Austria) Jürgen Melzer	(Germany) Philipp Kohlschreiber (Serbia) Janko Tipsarević	(Spain) Feliciano López (Spain) Nicolás Almagro (France) Gaël Monfils (Czech Republic) Radek Štěpánek

=== November ===
Week	Tournament	Champions	Runners-up	Semifinalists	Quarterfinalists
2 Nov	Valencia Open 500; Valencia, Spain; ATP World Tour 500; Hard (i) – €2,019,000 – 32S/16D; Singles – Doubles	(United Kingdom) Andy Murray; 6–3, 6–2	(Russia) Mikhail Youzhny	(Spain) Fernando Verdasco (Russia) Nikolay Davydenko	(Spain) Albert Montañés (Spain) Tommy Robredo (France) Gilles Simon (Spain) Guillermo García López
2 Nov	Valencia Open 500; Valencia, Spain; ATP World Tour 500; Hard (i) – €2,019,000 – 32S/16D; Singles – Doubles	(Czech Republic) František Čermák (Slovakia) Michal Mertiňák; 6–4, 6–3	(Spain) Marcel Granollers (Spain) Tommy Robredo	(Spain) Fernando Verdasco (Russia) Nikolay Davydenko	(Spain) Albert Montañés (Spain) Tommy Robredo (France) Gilles Simon (Spain) Guillermo García López
2 Nov	Davidoff Swiss Indoors; Basel, Switzerland; ATP World Tour 500; Hard (i) – €1,755,000 – 32S/16D; Singles – Doubles	(Serbia) Novak Djokovic; 6–4, 4–6, 6–2	(Switzerland) Roger Federer	(Switzerland) Marco Chiudinelli (Czech Republic) Radek Štěpánek	(Russia) Evgeny Korolev (France) Richard Gasquet (Croatia) Marin Čilić (Switzerland) Stanislas Wawrinka
2 Nov	Davidoff Swiss Indoors; Basel, Switzerland; ATP World Tour 500; Hard (i) – €1,755,000 – 32S/16D; Singles – Doubles	(Canada) Daniel Nestor (Serbia) Nenad Zimonjić; 6–2, 6–3	(United States) Bob Bryan (United States) Mike Bryan	(Switzerland) Marco Chiudinelli (Czech Republic) Radek Štěpánek	(Russia) Evgeny Korolev (France) Richard Gasquet (Croatia) Marin Čilić (Switzerland) Stanislas Wawrinka
9 Nov	BNP Paribas Masters; Paris, France; ATP World Tour Masters 1000; Hard (i) – €2,227,500 – 48S/24D; Singles – Doubles	(Serbia) Novak Djokovic; 6–2, 5–7, 7–6^{(7–3)}	(France) Gaël Monfils	(Czech Republic) Radek Štěpánek (Spain) Rafael Nadal	(Croatia) Marin Čilić (Argentina) Juan Martín del Potro (Sweden) Robin Söderling (France) Jo-Wilfried Tsonga
9 Nov	BNP Paribas Masters; Paris, France; ATP World Tour Masters 1000; Hard (i) – €2,227,500 – 48S/24D; Singles – Doubles	(Canada) Daniel Nestor (Serbia) Nenad Zimonjić; 6–3, 6–4	(Spain) Marcel Granollers (Spain) Tommy Robredo	(Czech Republic) Radek Štěpánek (Spain) Rafael Nadal	(Croatia) Marin Čilić (Argentina) Juan Martín del Potro (Sweden) Robin Söderling (France) Jo-Wilfried Tsonga
23 Nov	Barclays ATP World Tour Finals; London, United Kingdom; ATP World Tour Finals; Hard (i) – $5,000,000 – 8S/8D (RR); Singles – Doubles	(Russia) Nikolay Davydenko; 6–3, 6–4	(Argentina) Juan Martín del Potro	(Switzerland) Roger Federer (Sweden) Robin Söderling	Round Robin (United Kingdom) Andy Murray (Spain) Fernando Verdasco (Serbia) Novak Djokovic (Spain) Rafael Nadal
23 Nov	Barclays ATP World Tour Finals; London, United Kingdom; ATP World Tour Finals; Hard (i) – $5,000,000 – 8S/8D (RR); Singles – Doubles	(United States) Bob Bryan (United States) Mike Bryan; 7–6^{(7–5)}, 6–3	(Belarus) Max Mirnyi (Israel) Andy Ram	(Switzerland) Roger Federer (Sweden) Robin Söderling	Round Robin (United Kingdom) Andy Murray (Spain) Fernando Verdasco (Serbia) Novak Djokovic (Spain) Rafael Nadal
30 Nov	Davis Cup Final; Barcelona, Spain – clay (i)	Spain 5–0	Czech Republic		

== Statistical information ==
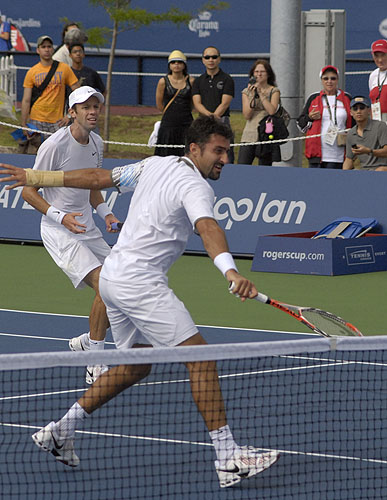
Year-end No. 2 team of Daniel Nestor (left) and Nenad Zimonjić (right) recorded the most titles wins in 2009, with nine trophies.

These tables present the number of singles (S), doubles (D), and mixed doubles (X) titles won by each player and each nation during the season, within all the tournament categories of the 2009 ATP World Tour: the Grand Slam tournaments, the ATP World Tour Finals, the ATP World Tour Masters 1000, the ATP World Tour 500 series, and the ATP World Tour 250 series. The players/nations are sorted by: 1) total number of titles (a doubles title won by two players representing the same nation counts as only one win for the nation); 2) cumulated importance of those titles (one Grand Slam win equalling two Masters 1000 wins, one ATP World Tour Finals win equalling one-and-a-half Masters 1000 win, one Masters 1000 win equalling two 500 events wins, one 500 event win equalling two 250 events wins); 3) a singles > doubles > mixed doubles hierarchy; 4) alphabetical order (by family names for players).

=== Key ===
Grand Slam tournaments
ATP World Tour Finals
ATP World Tour Masters 1000
ATP World Tour 500
ATP World Tour 250
All titles

=== Titles won by player ===
Total	Player	Grand Slam			ATP Finals		Masters 1000		Tour 500		Tour 250		Total		
Total	Player	S	D	X	S	D	S	D	S	D	S	D	S	D	X
9	Daniel Nestor (CAN)		●					● ● ● ● ●		● ● ●			0	9	0
9	Nenad Zimonjić (SRB)		●					● ● ● ● ●		● ● ●			0	9	0
8	Bob Bryan (USA)		●	●		●				●		● ● ● ●	0	7	1
7	Mike Bryan (USA)		●			●				●		● ● ● ●	0	7	0
6	Rafael Nadal (ESP)	●					● ● ●		●			●	5	1	0
6	Andy Murray (GBR)						● ●		● ●		● ●		6	0	0
5	Nikolay Davydenko (RUS)				●		●		●		● ●		5	0	0
5	Novak Djokovic (SRB)						●		● ● ●		●		5	0	0
5	Jo-Wilfried Tsonga (FRA)							●	●		● ●	●	3	2	0
5	František Čermák (CZE)									● ●		● ● ●	0	5	0
5	Michal Mertiňák (SVK)									● ●		● ● ●	0	5	0
4	Roger Federer (SUI)	● ●					● ●						4	0	0
4	Rajeev Ram (USA)										●	● ● ●	1	3	0
3	Juan Martín del Potro (ARG)	●							●		●		3	0	0
3	Mark Knowles (BAH)			●				●		●			0	2	1
3	Mardy Fish (USA)							●		●	●		1	2	0
3	Jürgen Melzer (AUT)									●	●	●	1	2	0
3	Dmitry Tursunov (RUS)									●	●	●	1	2	0
3	Martin Damm (CZE)									●		● ●	0	3	0
3	Robert Lindstedt (SWE)									●		● ●	0	3	0
3	Tommy Robredo (ESP)										● ●	●	2	1	0
3	Radek Štěpánek (CZE)										● ●	●	2	1	0
3	Eric Butorac (USA)											● ● ●	0	3	0
3	Marcel Granollers (ESP)											● ● ●	0	3	0
3	Łukasz Kubot (POL)											● ● ●	0	3	0
3	Oliver Marach (AUT)											● ● ●	0	3	0
2	Lukáš Dlouhý (CZE)		● ●										0	2	0
2	Leander Paes (IND)		● ●										0	2	0
2	Mahesh Bhupathi (IND)			●				●					0	1	1
2	Andy Roddick (USA)							●	●				1	1	0
2	Julien Benneteau (FRA)							●				●	0	2	0
2	Julian Knowle (AUT)									●		●	0	2	0
2	Marin Čilić (CRO)										● ●		2	0	0
2	Albert Montañés (ESP)										● ●		2	0	0
2	Tommy Haas (GER)										●	●	1	1	0
2	Mikhail Youzhny (RUS)										●	●	1	1	0
2	Pablo Cuevas (URU)											● ●	0	2	0
2	Colin Fleming (GBR)											● ●	0	2	0
2	Mariusz Fyrstenberg (POL)											● ●	0	2	0
2	Marcin Matkowski (POL)											● ●	0	2	0
2	Wesley Moodie (RSA)											● ●	0	2	0
2	Dick Norman (BEL)											● ●	0	2	0
2	Ken Skupski (GBR)											● ●	0	2	0
1	Travis Parrott (USA)			●									0	0	1
1	Max Mirnyi (BLR)							●					0	1	0
1	Andy Ram (ISR)							●					0	1	0
1	Nicolás Almagro (ESP)								●				1	0	0
1	Simon Aspelin (SWE)									●			0	1	0
1	Paul Hanley (AUS)									●			0	1	0
1	Rik de Voest (RSA)									●			0	1	0
1	Marcos Baghdatis (CYP)										●		1	0	0
1	Benjamin Becker (GER)										●		1	0	0
1	Thomaz Bellucci (BRA)										●		1	0	0
1	Tomáš Berdych (CZE)										●		1	0	0
1	Jérémy Chardy (FRA)										●		1	0	0
1	Juan Carlos Ferrero (ESP)										●		1	0	0
1	Guillermo García López (ESP)										●		1	0	0
1	Robby Ginepri (USA)										●		1	0	0
1	Fernando González (CHI)										●		1	0	0
1	Lleyton Hewitt (AUS)										●		1	0	0
1	Ivan Ljubičić (CRO)										●		1	0	0
1	Gaël Monfils (FRA)										●		1	0	0
1	David Nalbandian (ARG)										●		1	0	0
1	Sam Querrey (USA)										●		1	0	0
1	Gilles Simon (FRA)										●		1	0	0
1	Robin Söderling (SWE)										●		1	0	0
1	Sergiy Stakhovsky (UKR)										●		1	0	0
1	Fernando Verdasco (ESP)										●		1	0	0
1	James Cerretani (USA)											●	0	1	0
1	Marco Chiudinelli (SUI)											●	0	1	0
1	Arnaud Clément (FRA)											●	0	1	0
1	Brian Dabul (ARG)											●	0	1	0
1	Marc Gicquel (FRA)											●	0	1	0
1	Ernests Gulbis (LAT)											●	0	1	0
1	Jan Hernych (CZE)											●	0	1	0
1	Christopher Kas (GER)											●	0	1	0
1	Jordan Kerr (AUS)											●	0	1	0
1	Philipp Kohlschreiber (GER)											●	0	1	0
1	Michael Lammer (SUI)											●	0	1	0
1	Jaroslav Levinský (CZE)											●	0	1	0
1	Scott Lipsky (USA)											●	0	1	0
1	Michaël Llodra (FRA)											●	0	1	0
1	Marc López (ESP)											●	0	1	0
1	Nicolas Mahut (FRA)											●	0	1	0
1	Alberto Martín (ESP)											●	0	1	0
1	Marcelo Melo (BRA)											●	0	1	0
1	Ivo Minář (CZE)											●	0	1	0
1	Filip Polášek (SVK)											●	0	1	0
1	André Sá (BRA)											●	0	1	0
1	Bruno Soares (BRA)											●	0	1	0
1	Kevin Ullyett (ZIM)											●	0	1	0

=== Titles won by nation ===
Total	Nation	Grand Slam			ATP Finals		Masters 1000		Tour 500		Tour 250		Total		
Total	Nation	S	D	X	S	D	S	D	S	D	S	D	S	D	X
21	United States (USA)		1	2		1		1	1	2	4	9	5	14	2
17	Spain (ESP)	1					3		2		7	4	13	4	0
16	Czech Republic (CZE)		2							3	3	8	3	13	0
14	Serbia (SRB)		1				1	5	3	3	1		5	9	0
10	Russia (RUS)				1		1		1	1	4	2	6	3	0
10	France (FRA)							1	1		5	3	6	4	0
9	Canada (CAN)		1					5		3			0	9	0
8	Great Britain (GBR)						2		2		2	2	6	2	0
6	Slovakia (SVK)									2		4	0	6	0
6	Austria (AUT)									1	1	4	1	5	0
5	Switzerland (SUI)	2					2					1	4	1	0
5	Argentina (ARG)	1							1		2	1	4	1	0
5	Sweden (SWE)									2	1	2	1	4	0
5	Poland (POL)											5	0	5	0
4	India (IND)		2	1				1					0	3	1
4	Germany (GER)										2	2	2	2	0
3	Bahamas (BAH)			1				1		1			0	2	1
3	Australia (AUS)									1	1	1	1	1	0
3	South Africa (RSA)									1		2	0	3	0
3	Croatia (CRO)										3		3	0	0
3	Brazil (BRA)										1	2	1	2	0
2	Belgium (BEL)											2	0	2	0
2	Uruguay (URU)											2	0	2	0
1	Belarus (BLR)							1					0	1	0
1	Israel (ISR)							1					0	1	0
1	Chile (CHI)										1		1	0	0
1	Cyprus (CYP)										1		1	0	0
1	Ukraine (UKR)										1		1	0	0
1	Latvia (LAT)											1	0	1	0
1	Zimbabwe (ZIM)											1	0	1	0

=== Title information ===
The following players won their first main circuit title in singles, doubles, or mixed doubles:

Singles

- (United States) Rajeev Ram – Newport (singles)
- (Spain) Guillermo García López – Kitzbühel (singles)
- (Germany) Benjamin Becker – 's-Hertogenbosch (singles)
- (France) Jérémy Chardy – Stuttgart (singles)
- (Brazil) Thomaz Bellucci – Gstaad (singles)

Doubles

- (Spain) Marc López – Doha (doubles)
- (United States) Rajeev Ram – Chennai (doubles)
- (Argentina) Brian Dabul – Viña del Mar (doubles)
- (Germany) Tommy Haas – San José (doubles)
- (Spain) Marcel Granollers – Costa do Sauípe (doubles)
- (Poland) Łukasz Kubot – Casablanca (doubles)
- (Czech Republic) Jan Hernych – Munich (doubles)
- (Czech Republic) Ivo Minář – Munich (doubles)
- (Switzerland) Marco Chiudinelli – Gstaad (doubles)
- (Switzerland) Michael Lammer – Gstaad (doubles)
- (United Kingdom) Colin Fleming – Metz (doubles)
- (United Kingdom) Ken Skupski – Metz (doubles)

Mixed Doubles

- (United States) Travis Parrott – US Open (mixed doubles)

The following players defended a main circuit title in singles, doubles, or mixed doubles:

- (Chile) Fernando González – Viña del Mar (singles)
- (The Bahamas) Mark Knowles – Memphis (doubles)
- (Spain) Rafael Nadal – Monte Carlo (singles), Barcelona (singles)
- (Spain) Nicolás Almagro – Acapulco (singles)
- (Slovakia) Michal Mertiňák – Acapulco (doubles), Umag (doubles)
- (United States) Bob Bryan – French Open (mixed doubles)
- (Canada) Daniel Nestor – Wimbledon Championships (doubles)
- (Serbia) Nenad Zimonjić – Wimbledon Championships (doubles)
- (Argentina) Juan Martín del Potro – Washington (singles)
- (Sweden) Robert Lindstedt – Washington (doubles)
- (Zimbabwe) Kevin Ullyett – Stockholm (doubles)

== Rankings ==
These are the ATP rankings of the top twenty singles players, doubles players, and the top ten doubles teams on the ATP Tour, at the end of the 2008 ATP Tour, and of the 2009 season, with number of rankings points, number of tournaments played, year-end ranking in 2008, highest and lowest position during the season (for singles and doubles individual only, as doubles team rankings are not calculated over a rolling year-to-date system), and number of spots gained or lost from the 2008 to the 2009 year-end rankings. The 2008 year-end rankings include the number of points under the 2008 points system, and doubled, as they were at the end of the year by the ATP, to fit the 2009 points system (the doubles (team) rankings points were not doubled, as they were calculated under the ATP Race points system in 2008). The doubled year-end rankings were never officially published though, as the first rankings of 2009 already counted the drop of the 2008 season openers' points due to a calendar change.

=== Singles ===
as of December 29, 2008
#	Player	Points	Points (x2)
1	Rafael Nadal (ESP)	6675	13350
2	Roger Federer (SUI)	5305	10610
3	Novak Djokovic (SRB)	5295	10590
4	Andy Murray (GBR)	3720	7440
5	Nikolay Davydenko (RUS)	2715	5430
6	Jo-Wilfried Tsonga (FRA)	2050	4100
7	Gilles Simon (FRA)	1980	3960
8	Andy Roddick (USA)	1970	3940
9	Juan Martín del Potro (ARG)	1945	3890
10	James Blake (USA)	1775	3550
11	David Nalbandian (ARG)	1725	3500
12	David Ferrer (ESP)	1695	3390
13	Stanislas Wawrinka (SUI)	1510	3020
14	Gaël Monfils (FRA)	1475	2950
15	Fernando González (CHI)	1420	2840
16	Fernando Verdasco (ESP)	1415	2830
17	Robin Söderling (SWE)	1325	2650
18	Nicolás Almagro (ESP)	1270	2540
19	Igor Andreev (RUS)	1245	2490
20	Tomáš Berdych (CZE)	1215	2430

Year-end rankings 2009 (28 December 2009)
#	Player	Points	#Trn	'08 Rk	High	Low	'08→'09
1	Roger Federer (SUI)	10550	19	2	1	2	▲1
2	Rafael Nadal (ESP)	9205	19	1	1	3	▼1
3	Novak Djokovic (SRB)	8310	23	3	3	4	Steady
4	Andy Murray (GBR)	7030	19	4	2	4	Steady
5	Juan Martín del Potro (ARG)	6785	22	9	5	9	▲4
6	Nikolay Davydenko (RUS)	4930	26	5	5	12	▼1
7	Andy Roddick (USA)	4410	20	8	5	9	▲1
8	Robin Söderling (SWE)	3410	27	17	8	27	▲9
9	Fernando Verdasco (ESP)	3300	24	16	7	15	▲7
10	Jo-Wilfried Tsonga (FRA)	2875	26	6	6	14	▼4
11	Fernando González (CHI)	2870	18	15	10	18	▲4
12	Radek Štěpánek (CZE)	2625	23	27	12	26	▲15
13	Gaël Monfils (FRA)	2610	24	14	9	16	▲1
14	Marin Čilić (CRO)	2430	23	23	13	27	▲9
15	Gilles Simon (FRA)	2275	27	7	6	15	▼8
16	Tommy Robredo (ESP)	2175	27	21	14	22	▲5
17	David Ferrer (ESP)	1870	26	12	12	23	▼5
18	Tommy Haas (GER)	1855	19	82	17	87	▲64
19	Mikhail Youzhny (RUS)	1690	31	32	19	76	▲13
20	Tomáš Berdych (CZE)	1655	28	20	16	28	Steady

=== Doubles (Individual) ===
as of December 29, 2008
#	Player	Points	Points (x2)
1	Nenad Zimonjić (SRB)	5320	10640
2	Daniel Nestor (CAN)	5320	10640
3	Bob Bryan (USA)	5225	10450
=	Mike Bryan (USA)	5225	10450
5	Andy Ram (ISR)	3370	6740
6	Mahesh Bhupathi (IND)	3295	6590
7	Mark Knowles (BAH)	3275	6550
8	Kevin Ullyett (ZIM)	3265	6530
9	Jonas Björkman (SWE)	3140	6280
10	Leander Paes (IND)	2900	5800
11	Jonathan Erlich (ISR)	2810	5620
12	Jeff Coetzee (RSA)	2560	5120
13	Lukáš Dlouhý (CZE)	2523	5046
14	Wesley Moodie (RSA)	2380	4760
15	Mariusz Fyrstenberg (POL)	2250	4500
=	Marcin Matkowski (POL)	2250	4500
17	Luis Horna (PER)	2150	4300
18	Michaël Llodra (FRA)	2010	4020
19	Marcelo Melo (BRA)	1790	3580
20	André Sá (BRA)	1690	3380

Year-end rankings 2009 (28 December 2009)
#	Player	Points	#Trn	'08 Rk	High	Low	'08→'09
1	Bob Bryan (USA)	10480	25	3T	1T	3T	▲2
=	Mike Bryan (USA)	10480	25	3T	1T	3T	▲2
3	Daniel Nestor (CAN)	10410	25	2	1	4	▼1
=	Nenad Zimonjić (SRB)	10410	27	1	1	4	▼2
5	Mark Knowles (BAH)	6880	23	7	5	9	▲2
6	Lukáš Dlouhý (CZE)	6460	25	13	5	12	▲7
7	Mahesh Bhupathi (IND)	6260	21	6	5	11	▼1
8	Leander Paes (IND)	5890	17	10	5	10	▲2
9	Andy Ram (ISR)	4950	26	5	5	13	▼4
10	Wesley Moodie (RSA)	4550	28	14	8	30	▲4
11	Max Mirnyi (BLR)	4350	18	32	11	51	▲21
12	Łukasz Kubot (POL)	3880	24	72	11	69	▲60
13	Oliver Marach (AUT)	3790	30	69	12	72	▲56
14	Michal Mertiňák (SVK)	3740	34	28	14	41	▲24
15	Dick Norman (BEL)	3666	22	103	11	101	▲88
16	František Čermák (CZE)	3590	35	34	16	35	▲18
17	Marcin Matkowski (POL)	3490	29	15T	11	17	▼2
18	Mariusz Fyrstenberg (POL)	3400	28	15T	11T	18	▼3
19	Mardy Fish (USA)	3275	12	88	14	88	▲69
20	Tommy Robredo (ESP)	2905	20	33	16	43	▲13

=== Doubles ===
as of December 29, 2008
#	Player	Points
1	Daniel Nestor (CAN); Nenad Zimonjić (SRB)	1064
2	Bob Bryan (USA); Mike Bryan (USA)	1045
3	Mahesh Bhupathi (IND); Mark Knowles (BAH)	655
4	Jonas Björkman (SWE); Kevin Ullyett (ZIM)	605
5	Jonathan Erlich (ISR); Andy Ram (ISR)	551
6	Jeff Coetzee (RSA); Wesley Moodie (RSA)	476
7	Mariusz Fyrstenberg (POL); Marcin Matkowski (POL)	450
8	Lukáš Dlouhý (CZE); Leander Paes (IND)	433
9	Marcelo Melo (BRA); André Sá (BRA)	338
10	Simon Aspelin (SWE); Julian Knowle (AUT)	313

Year-end rankings 2009 (28 December 2009)
#	Player	Points	#Trn	'08 Rk	'08→'09
1	Bob Bryan (USA); Mike Bryan (USA)	10800	25	2	▲1
2	Daniel Nestor (CAN); Nenad Zimonjić (SRB)	10710	25	1	▼1
3	Mahesh Bhupathi (IND); Mark Knowles (BAH)	6350	20	3	Steady
4	Lukáš Dlouhý (CZE); Leander Paes (IND)	5740	16	8	▲4
5	Max Mirnyi (BLR); Andy Ram (ISR)	4350	16	56T	▲51
6	František Čermák (CZE); Michal Mertiňák (SVK)	3980	33	—	New
7	Łukasz Kubot (POL); Oliver Marach (AUT)	3970	23	—	New
8	Mariusz Fyrstenberg (POL); Marcin Matkowski (POL)	3535	27	7	▼1
9	Wesley Moodie (RSA); Dick Norman (BEL)	3295	13	—	New
10	Bruno Soares (BRA); Kevin Ullyett (ZIM)	2560	25	52	▲42

== Prize money leaders ==
As of December 28, 2009

#	Country	Player	Singles	Doubles	Year-to-date
1.	SUI	Roger Federer	$8,761,805	$6,305	$8,768,110
2.	ESP	Rafael Nadal	$6,414,604	$51,911	$6,466,515
3.	SRB	Novak Djokovic	$5,438,063	$38,408	$5,476,471
4.	ARG	Juan Martín del Potro	$4,712,743	$40,344	$4,753,087
5.	GBR	Andy Murray	$4,397,231	$23,826	$4,421,057
6.	RUS	Nikolay Davydenko	$3,636,773	$22,387	$3,659,160
7.	USA	Andy Roddick	$2,333,357	$145,362	$2,478,719
8.	SWE	Robin Söderling	$2,294,548	$19,237	$2,313,785
9.	ESP	Fernando Verdasco	$1,863,864	$52,766	$1,916,630
10.	FRA	Jo-Wilfried Tsonga	$1,633,191	$185,361	$1,818,552

== Statistics leaders ==
As of December 21, 2009. Source

ACES
Pos	Player	Aces	Matches
1	(Croatia) Ivo Karlović	890	43
2	(United States) Andy Roddick	762	61
3	(United States) Sam Querrey	739	64
4	(France) Jo-Wilfried Tsonga	708	69
5	(Switzerland) Roger Federer	657	71
6	(United States) John Isner	653	45
7	(Croatia) Ivan Ljubičić	636	55
8	(Sweden) Robin Söderling	636	68
9	(United Kingdom) Andy Murray	586	75
10	(Argentina) Juan Martín del Potro	575	68

SERVICE GAMES WON
Pos	Player	%	Matches
1	(Croatia) Ivo Karlović	92	43
2	(United States) Andy Roddick	91	61
3	(Switzerland) Roger Federer	90	71
4	(France) Jo-Wilfried Tsonga	89	69
5	(United States) John Isner	89	45
6	(Chile) Fernando González	88	55
7	(Sweden) Robin Söderling	86	68
8	(United States) Sam Querrey	86	64
9	(Serbia) Novak Djokovic	85	95
10	(United Kingdom) Andy Murray	85	75

BREAK POINTS SAVED
Pos	Player	%	Matches
1	(Chile) Fernando González	71	55
2	(United States) John Isner	70	45
3	(Switzerland) Roger Federer	69	71
4	(Croatia) Ivo Karlović	69	43
5	(France) Gilles Simon	67	72
6	(France) Jo-Wilfried Tsonga	67	69
7	(Croatia) Ivan Ljubičić	67	55
8	(Serbia) Novak Djokovic	66	95
9	(Spain) Fernando Verdasco	66	75
10	(Germany) Philipp Kohlschreiber	66	62

FIRST SERVE PERCENTAGE
Pos	Player	%	Matches
1	(United States) Andy Roddick	70	61
2	(Spain) Fernando Verdasco	69	75
3	(Argentina) Juan Mónaco	69	59
4	(Romania) Victor Hănescu	69	56
5	(Argentina) Martín Vassallo Argüello	69	40
6	(Spain) Rafael Nadal	68	76
7	(Russia) Nikolay Davydenko	67	74
8	(Spain) Juan Carlos Ferrero	67	53
9	(United States) John Isner	67	45
10	(Croatia) Ivo Karlović	67	43

FIRST SERVICE POINTS WON
Pos	Player	%	Matches
1	(Croatia) Ivo Karlović	85	45
2	(France) Jo-Wilfried Tsonga	80	69
3	(Switzerland) Roger Federer	79	71
4	(United States) Sam Querrey	79	64
5	(United States) Andy Roddick	79	61
6	(Sweden) Robin Söderling	78	68
7	(Croatia) Ivan Ljubičić	78	55
8	(Chile) Fernando González	77	55
9	(Germany) Tommy Haas	77	48
10	(United Kingdom) Andy Murray	76	75

SECOND SERVE POINTS WON
Pos	Player	%	Matches
1	(Switzerland) Roger Federer	57	71
2	(Spain) Rafael Nadal	57	76
3	(United States) Andy Roddick	57	61
4	(Germany) Philipp Kohlschreiber	56	62
5	(United States) John Isner	56	45
6	(Russia) Nikolay Davydenko	55	74
7	(Serbia) Novak Djokovic	54	95
8	(United Kingdom) Andy Murray	54	75
8	(Spain) Fernando Verdasco	54	75
10	(France) Gilles Simon	54	72

POINTS WON RETURNING 1ST SERVICE
Pos	Player	%	Matches
1	(United Kingdom) Andy Murray	35	75
2	(Russia) Nikolay Davydenko	34	74
3	(Argentina) Juan Mónaco	34	59
4	(Serbia) Novak Djokovic	33	95
5	(Spain) Rafael Nadal	33	76
6	(Croatia) Marin Čilić	33	65
7	(Spain) David Ferrer	32	62
8	(Switzerland) Stanislas Wawrinka	32	48
9	(Spain) Marcel Granollers	32	41
10	(Spain) Fernando Verdasco	31	75

BREAK POINTS CONVERTED
Pos	Player	%	Matches
1	(Spain) Rafael Nadal	47	76
2	(United Kingdom) Andy Murray	46	75
3	(Spain) Fernando Verdasco	45	75
4	(Spain) Albert Montañés	45	45
5	(Spain) Tommy Robredo	44	70
6	(Sweden) Robin Söderling	44	68
7	(Argentina) Juan Mónaco	44	59
8	(Serbia) Victor Troicki	44	58
9	(France) Gilles Simon	43	72
10	(Spain) David Ferrer	43	62

RETURN GAMES WON
Pos	Player	%	Matches
1	(Spain) Rafael Nadal	34	76
2	(United Kingdom) Andy Murray	33	75
3	(Spain) David Ferrer	32	62
4	(Serbia) Novak Djokovic	31	95
5	(Russia) Nikolay Davydenko	31	74
6	(Argentina) Juan Mónaco	31	59
7	(Spain) Fernando Verdasco	28	75
8	(Australia) Lleyton Hewitt	28	52
9	(Argentina) Juan Martín del Potro	27	68
10	(Croatia) Marin Čilić	27	65

== Best 5 Matches by ATPWorldTour.com ==
	Event	Round	Surface	Winner	Opponent	Result
1.	Wimbledon	F	Grass	(Switzerland) Roger Federer	(United States) Andy Roddick	5–7, 7–6(8–6), 7–6(7–5), 3–6, 16–14
2.	Madrid Open	SF	Clay	(Spain) Rafael Nadal	(Serbia) Novak Djokovic	3–6, 7–6(7–5), 7–6^{(11–9)}
3.	Australian Open	SF	Hard	(Spain) Rafael Nadal	(Spain) Fernando Verdasco	6–7(4–7), 6–4, 7–6(7–2), 6–7(1–7), 6–4
4.	US Open	R2	Hard	(United States) Taylor Dent	(Spain) Iván Navarro	6–4, 5–7, 6–7(1–7), 7–5, 7–6^{(11–9)}
5.	ATP Finals	SF	Hard (i)	(Russia) Nikolay Davydenko	(Switzerland) Roger Federer	6–2, 4–6, 7–5

== Point distribution ==
Tournament Category	W	F	SF (3rd/4th)	QF	R16	R32	R64	R128	Additional qualifying points
Grand Slam	2000	1200	720	360	180	90	45	10	25
ATP World Tour Finals	1500^ 1100^{m}	1000^ 600^{m}	600^ 200^{m}	(200 for each round robin match win, +400 for a semifinal win, +500 for the final win)					
Masters 1000	1000	600	360	180	90	45	10 (25)	(10)	25
500	500	300	180	90	45	(20)			20
250	250	150	90	45	20	(10)			12

- (ATP World Tour Masters 1000) Qualifying points changes to 12 points only if the main draw is larger than 56
- (ATP World Tour 500) Qualifying points changes to 10 points only if the main draw is larger than 32
- (ATP World Tour 250) Qualifying points changes to 5 points only if the main draw is larger than 32

Davis Cup
Rubber category		Match win	Match loss	Team bonus	Performance bonus	Total achievable
Singles	Play-offs	5 / 10^{1}				15
Singles	First round	40	10^{2}			80
Singles	Quarterfinals	65				130
Singles	Semifinals	70				140
Singles	Final	75		75^{3}	125^{4}	150 / 225^{3} / 275^{4}
Singles	Cumulative total	500		500 to 535^{3}	625^{4}	625^{4}
Doubles	Play-offs	10				10
Doubles	First round	50	10^{2}			50
Doubles	Quarterfinals	80				80
Doubles	Semifinals	90				90
Doubles	Final	95		35^{5}		95 / 130^{5}
Doubles	Cumulative total	315		350^{5}		350^{5}

The Davis Cup World Group and World Group Play-Off matches awarded ATP Ranking points from 2009 to 2015.

Glossary

Only live matches earn points; dead rubbers earn no points. If a player does not compete in the singles of one or more rounds he will receive points from the previous round when playing singles at the next tie. This last rule also applies for playing in doubles matches.

^{1} A player who wins a singles rubber in the first day of the tie is awarded 5 points, whereas a singles rubber win in tie's last day grants 10 points for a total of 15 available points.

^{2} For the first round only, any player who competes in a live rubber, without a win, receives 10 ranking points for participation.

^{3} Team bonus awarded to a singles player who wins 7 live matches in a calendar year and his team wins the competition.

^{4} Performance bonus awarded to a singles player who wins 8 live matches in a calendar year. In this case, no Team bonus is awarded.

^{5} Team bonus awarded to an unchanged doubles team who wins 4 matches in a calendar year and his team wins the competition.

World Team Cup
Match type	1st round	2nd round	3rd round	Finals	Points	Bonus	Total
Singles 1	35	35	35	95	200	50	250
Singles 2	25	25	25	50	125	50	175
Deciding match (doubles)	35	35	35	95	200	50	250
Dead rubber (doubles)	10	10	10	20	50		50

- Players who only play the finals will be awarded points from the previous round.
- Players must win all 4 matches and be part of the winning team in order to earn the Bonus Points.

== Retirements ==
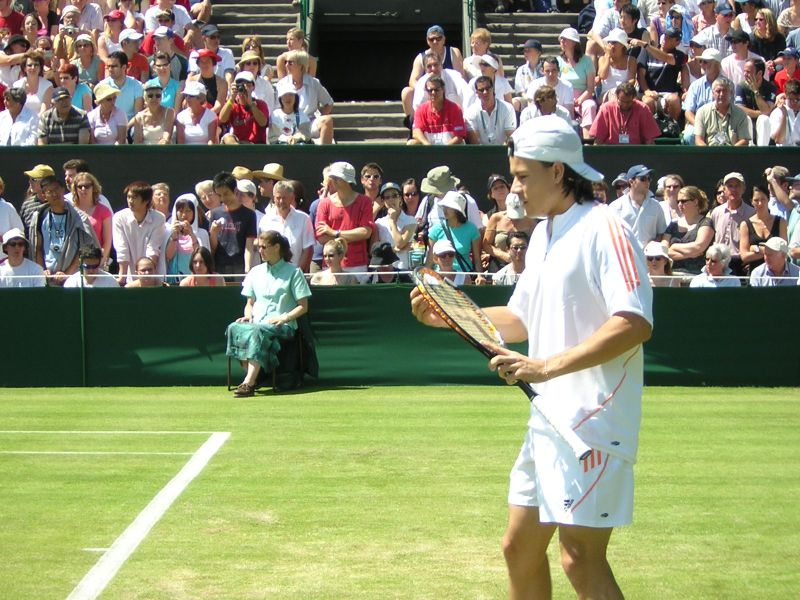
Former ATP no. 3 Guillermo Coria became the first player to lose a Grand Slam final despite holding two match points.

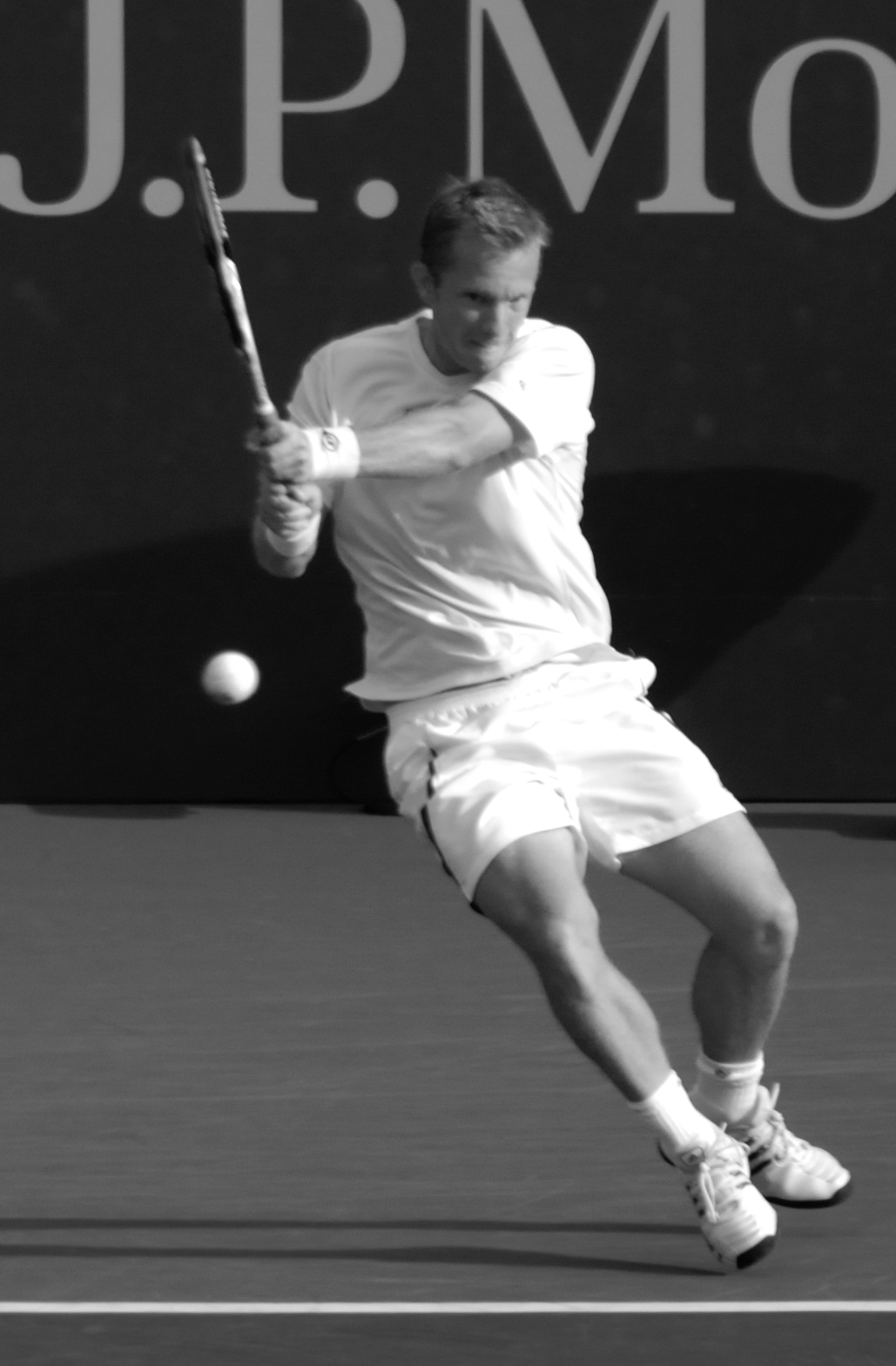
Thomas Johansson won the Australian Open in 2002.

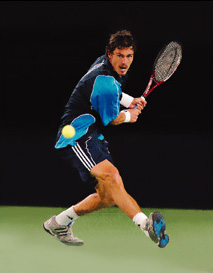
Former world no. 1 Marat Safin ended his professional career at the 2009 BNP Paribas Masters.

Following is a list of notable players (winners of a main tour title, and/or part of the ATP rankings top 100 (singles) or top 50 (doubles) for at least one week) who announced their retirement from professional tennis during the 2009 season:

- (Argentina) Agustín Calleri (born September 14, 1976, in Río Cuarto, Argentina) started his pro career in 1995, reaching his best singles ranking, no. 16, in 2003. A clay court specialist, Calleri titled twice in singles and thrice in doubles during his time on the main tour, but never went further than the third round in any Grand Slam tournament. He played his last professional match in July on the ATP Challenger Tour in Bogotá.
- (Argentina) Guillermo Coria (born January 13, 1982, in Rufino, Argentina) joined the pro circuit in 2000, reaching his best singles ranking, no. 3, in 2004, and finishing three seasons within the top 10 (2003–2005). Junior French Open singles champion and Junior Wimbledon doubles champion in 1999, Coria collected nine singles titles on the main tour, among which two ATP Masters Series titles (Hamburg 2003 and Monte Carlo 2004). Two-time quarterfinalist at the US Open (2003, 2005), Coria lost the 2004 French Open final to countryman Gastón Gaudio, despite leading by two sets to love and later holding two match points in the final set. He played his last match in March at a Challenger event in Bangkok.
- (France) Nicolas Coutelot (born February 9, 1977, in Strasbourg, France) became a professional in 1996, reaching his highest singles ranking, no. 87, in 2002. Coutelot mostly competed on the ATP Challenger Tour and the ITF Men's Circuit, where he played his last match in a Futures tournament in April.
- (Austria) Werner Eschauer (born April 26, 1974, in Hollenstein an der Ybbs, Austria) turned professional in 1998, reaching his career-high singles ranking of no. 52 in 2007. Eschauer competed mainly on the ATP Challenger Tour and the ITF Men's Circuit during his career, playing his last match in a Futures tournament in November.
- (Peru) Luis Horna (born September 14, 1980, in Lima, Peru) came on the tour in 1998, reaching career-high rankings of singles no. 33 in 2004 and doubles no. 16 in 2008. A French Open and Wimbledon Junior doubles champion, Horna took home two singles and six doubles titles on the main circuit, clinching his biggest win at the French Open (2008), which he won with Pablo Cuevas. Horna last competed at the Lima Challenger in November.
- (Sweden) Thomas Johansson (born March 25, 1975, in Linköping, Sweden) turned professional in 1993 and ranked as high as no. 7 in mid-2002, though he never finished a season in the top 10. Twice a quarterfinalist at the US Open (1998, 2000), once a semifinalist in Wimbledon (2005), Johansson won one Grand Slam title at the Australian Open (2002, def. Safin). Over his career, he collected eight more singles titles, one doubles title, and a silver medal in doubles at the 2008 Olympics. Johansson last competed in the Miami qualifying in March.
- (South Korea) Hyung-taik Lee (born January 3, 1976, in Hoengseong, South Korea) joined the tour in 1995, reaching a career-high ranking of no. 36 in 2007. Lee won one singles and one doubles titles on the main circuit, posting his best results on the ATP Challenger Tour where he last played in Seoul in October.
- (Czech Republic) Petr Pála (born October 2, 1975, in Prague, Czech Republic, then Czechoslovakia) turned professional in 1993, peaking at the no. 10 doubles spot in 2001. Pála collected seven doubles titles in his career, also finishing runner-up, alongside Pavel Vízner, at the 2001 French Open and the 2001 doubles championships. Pála played his last professional match in Gstaad in July.
- (Romania) Andrei Pavel (born January 27, 1974, in Constanța, Romania) entered the circuit in 1995, reaching the no. 13 in singles in 2004, and in doubles in 2007. A French Open junior champion in 1992, Pavel collected three trophies in singles (including the 2001 Montreal Masters) and five in doubles during his career on the main tour. He last competed in singles and in doubles during the Bucharest tournament in September.
- (Argentina) Mariano Puerta (born September 19, 1978, in San Francisco, Argentina) turned pro in 1998, reaching a career-high singles ranking of no. 9 in 2005. He won three singles and one doubles titles on the main tour, and reached one Grand Slam final, at the French Open (2005, lost to Nadal). Puerta was sanctioned for doping offenses in 2003 (nine months) and 2005 (eight years, later reduced to two). He came back from suspension in 2007, competing until the Lima Challenger in November.
- (Argentina) Sergio Roitman (born May 16, 1979, in Buenos Aires, Argentina) became a pro player in 1996, peaking at no. 62 in singles in 2007, and no. 45 in doubles in 2008. Roitman titled twice in doubles on the main circuit, but most of his victories came on the ATP Challenger Tour, where he played his last match at the Guayaquil Challenger in November.
- (Russia) Marat Safin (born January 27, 1980, in Moscow, Russia, then USSR) turned professional in 1997, and became the 18th man to lead the ATP rankings as world no. 1 on November 20, 2000, holding the position for nine weeks over three spells. Over his 12-year career, Safin collected 15 singles titles (including five ATP Masters Series shields in Toronto (2000), Madrid (2004) and Paris (2000, 2002, 2004)) and two doubles trophies. A semifinalist at the French Open (2002) and at Wimbledon (2008), Safin won two Grand Slam titles out of four finals, his first coming at the US Open (2000, def. Sampras), his second at the Australian Open (2005, def. Hewitt) after two runner-up finishes in Melbourne (2002, lost to Johansson, 2004, lost to Federer). Three time a Top Ten finisher at the end of the season (2000, 2002, 2004), Safin also contributed to the two first Davis Cup victories for Russia in 2002 and 2006. He retired during the BNP Paribas Masters in November, playing his last match against Juan Martín del Potro before a ceremony was held for him on center court.
- (United States) Jim Thomas (born September 24, 1974, in Canton, United States) turned professional in 1996, and peaked at no. 29 doubles ranking in 2006. Thomas won six doubles titles on the main circuit during his career, and last competed in June on the ATP Challenger Tour in Reggia Emilia.
- (Germany) Alexander Waske (born May 31, 1975, in Frankfurt, Germany, then West Germany) joined the circuit in 2000, reaching career-high rankings of no. 89 in singles in 2006, and no. 16 in doubles in 2007. Waske won four doubles titles on the main tour, and played his last tournament at the French Open in May.
- (Czech Republic) Tomáš Zíb (born January 31, 1976, in Písek, Czech Republic, then Czechoslovakia) joined the circuit in 1995, and reached his best singles ranking, no. 51, in 2005. Also a top-100 player in doubles, Zíb won one doubles title in his career, playing his last tournament in Rome on the ATP Challenger Tour in April.

== See also ==
- 2009 WTA Tour
- 2009 ATP Challenger Tour
- 2009 ITF Women's Circuit
- Association of Tennis Professionals
- International Tennis Federation
