= 2009 PTT Thailand Open =

- Date: September 28 – October 4
- Edition: 7th

Champions

Singles
- (France) Gilles Simon

Doubles
- (United States) Eric Butorac / (United States) Rajeev Ram
- PTT Thailand Open

The 2009 PTT Thailand Open was a tennis tournament played on indoor hard courts. It was the 7th edition of the Thailand Open, and was part of the ATP World Tour 250 Series of the 2009 ATP World Tour. It was held at the Impact Arena in Bangkok, Thailand, from September 28 through October 4, 2009.

== Entrants ==
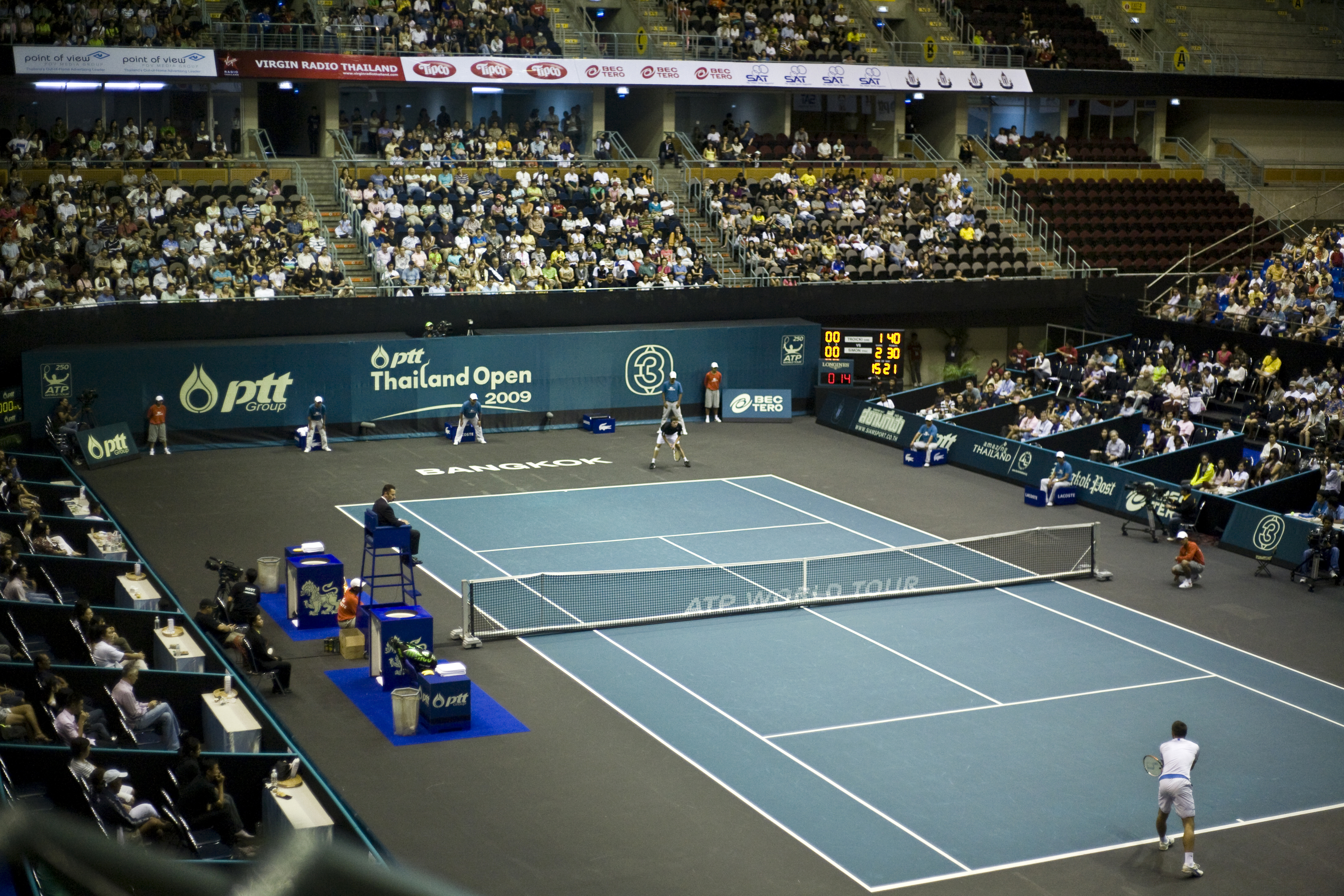
Final round at Impact Arena

=== Seeds ===
Country	Player	Rank^{1}	Seed
FRA	Jo-Wilfried Tsonga	7	1
FRA	Gilles Simon	10	2
USA	Sam Querrey	25	3
SRB	Victor Troicki	32	4
GER	Philipp Petzschner	35	5
AUT	Jürgen Melzer	39	6
FRA	Fabrice Santoro	40	7
USA	John Isner	41	8

- Seeds are based on the rankings of September 21, 2009

=== Other entrants ===
The following players received wildcards into the singles main draw:

- (Thailand) Danai Udomchoke
- (Thailand) Kittipong Wachiramanowong
- (India) Somdev Devvarman

The following players received entry from the qualifying draw:

- (Germany) Florian Mayer
- (Turkey) Marsel İlhan
- (Switzerland) Marco Chiudinelli
- (France) Édouard Roger-Vasselin

The following players received entry as a lucky loser:

- (United States) Donald Young

== Finals ==
=== Singles ===
(France) Gilles Simon defeated (Serbia) Viktor Troicki, 7–5, 6–3.

- It was Simon's first title of the year and 6th of his career.

=== Doubles ===
(United States) Eric Butorac / (United States) Rajeev Ram defeated (Spain) Guillermo García López / (Germany) Mischa Zverev, 7–6^{(7–4)}, 6–3.
