= 2009 Interwetten Austrian Open Kitzbühel =

- Date: 16–23 May
- Edition: 29th
- Category: World Tour 250 series
- Draw: 32S / 16D
- Prize money: €398,250
- Surface: Clay / outdoor
- Location: Kitzbühel, Austria
- Venue: Tennis Stadium Kitzbühel

Champions

Singles
- (Spain) Guillermo García López

Doubles
- (Brazil) Marcelo Melo / (Brazil) André Sá
- Interwetten Austrian Open Kitzbühel

The 2009 Interwetten Austrian Open Kitzbühel is a men's tennis tournament played on outdoor clay courts. It is the 29th edition of the tournament and was part of the World Tour 250 series of the 2009 ATP World Tour. It was held at the Tennis Stadium Kitzbühel in Kitzbühel Austria from 16 May until 23 May 2009. Unseeded Guillermo García López won the singles title.

== Finals ==
=== Singles ===
(Spain) Guillermo García López defeated (France) Julien Benneteau, 3–6, 7–6^{(7–1)}, 6–3

- It was García López's first career title.

=== Doubles ===
(Brazil) Marcelo Melo / (Brazil) André Sá defeated (Romania) Andrei Pavel / (Romania) Horia Tecău, 6–7^{(9–11)}, 6–2, [10–7]

== Entrants ==
=== Seeds ===
| Player | Nationality | Ranking* | Seeding |
|---|---|---|---|
| Nikolay Davydenko | Russia | 11 | 1 |
| Jürgen Melzer | Austria | 27 | 2 |
| Victor Hănescu | Romania | 33 | 3 |
| Fabrice Santoro | France | 43 | 4 |
| Martín Vassallo Argüello | Argentina | 49 | 5 |
| Marc Gicquel | France | 50 | 6 |
| Mikhail Youzhny | Russia | 52 | 7 |
| Dudi Sela | Israel | 57 | 8 |

- Seedings are based on the rankings of May 11, 2009.

=== Other entrants ===
The following players received wildcards into the main draw:

- (Germany) Andreas Beck
- (Austria) Daniel Köllerer
- (Austria) Stefan Koubek

The following players received entry from the qualifying draw:

- (Croatia) Mario Ančić
- (Ecuador) Nicolás Lapentti
- (Czech Republic) Robin Vik
- (Argentina) Juan Ignacio Chela
- (Spain) Rubén Ramírez Hidalgo (lucky loser replacing Robert Kendrick)
- (Chile) Paul Capdeville (lucky loser replacing Nikolay Davydenko)
- (France) Julien Benneteau (lucky loser replacing Nicolas Devilder)
