= 2009 PTT Thailand Open – Singles =

Singles
- 2009 PTT Thailand Open

Final
- Champion: (France) Gilles Simon
- Runner-up: (Serbia) Viktor Troicki
- Score: 7–5, 6–3

Events
Singles	Doubles
← 2008 ·	Thailand Open	· 2010 →

Jo-Wilfried Tsonga was the defending champion, but lost in the semifinals to Viktor Troicki.
Gilles Simon won in the final 7–5, 6–3, against Viktor Troicki.

== Seeds ==
The top four seeds receive a bye into the second round.

1. (France) Jo-Wilfried Tsonga (semifinals)
2. (France) Gilles Simon (champion)
3. (United States) Sam Querrey (withdrew due to arm injury)
4. (Serbia) Viktor Troicki (final)
5. (Germany) Philipp Petzschner (first round)
6. (Austria) Jürgen Melzer (semifinals)
7. (France) Fabrice Santoro (first round)
8. (United States) John Isner (quarterfinals)

== Draw ==
=== Key ===
- Q = Qualifier
- WC = Wild card
- LL = Lucky loser
- Alt = Alternate
- SE = Special exempt
- PR = Protected ranking
- ITF = ITF entry
- JE = Junior exempt
- w/o = Walkover
- r = Retired
- d = Defaulted
- SR = Special ranking

=== Finals ===
Semifinals
1	(France) Jo-Wilfried Tsonga	6	2	3
4	(Serbia) Viktor Troicki	1	6	6
6	(Austria) Jürgen Melzer	4	6^{3}
2	(France) Gilles Simon	6	7^{7}

Final
4	(Serbia) Viktor Troicki	5	3
2	(France) Gilles Simon	7	6

=== Top half ===
First round
WC	(India) S Devvarman	6^{7}	2
(Latvia) E Gulbis	7^{9}	6
Q	(Switzerland) M Chiudinelli	6	6
Q	(Germany) F Mayer	3	3
(Russia) M Safin	6	3	6
5	(Germany) P Petzschner	2	6	1
(Brazil) T Bellucci	6	7^{9}
(Spain) G García López	4	6^{7}
(Germany) M Zverev	5	6	6
(Argentina) L Mayer	7	3	3
WC	(Thailand) K Wachiramanowong	3	6	6^{5}
8	(United States) J Isner	6	3	7^{7}

Second round
1	(France) J-W Tsonga	6^{3}	7^{7}	7^{7}
(Latvia) E Gulbis	7^{7}	6^{4}	6^{2}
Q	(Switzerland) M Chiudinelli	6	7^{7}
(Russia) M Safin	3	6^{4}
4	(Serbia) V Troicki	6	7^{7}
(Brazil) T Bellucci	3	6^{4}
(Germany) M Zverev	6^{5}	4
8	(United States) J Isner	7^{7}	6

Quarterfinals
1	(France) J-W Tsonga	6^{7}	6	6
Q	(Switzerland) M Chiudinelli	7^{9}	3	4
4	(Serbia) V Troicki	7^{7}	6
8	(United States) J Isner	6^{3}	2

Semifinals
1	(France) J-W Tsonga	6	2	3
4	(Serbia) V Troicki	1	6	6

=== Bottom half ===
First round
6	(Austria) J Melzer	6	6
(Brazil) M Daniel	3	2
Q	(Turkey) M İlhan	4	7^{7}	6
(Germany) B Becker	6	6^{4}	3
(Germany) A Beck	7	7^{7}
Q	(France) É Roger-Vasselin	5	6^{1}
7	(France) F Santoro	6	6^{4}	6^{7}
(Russia) E Korolev	4	7^{7}	7^{9}
(United States) R Ginepri	6	6
WC	(Thailand) D Udomchoke	4	3
(United States) K Kim	6	6
(Germany) R Schüttler	4	4

Second round
6	(Austria) J Melzer	6	6
Q	(Turkey) M İlhan	4	2
(Germany) A Beck	6	6^{3}	6
LL	(United States) D Young	1	7^{7}	4
(Russia) E Korolev	6	6
(United States) R Ginepri	1	1
(United States) K Kim	2	2
2	(France) G Simon	6	6

Quarterfinals
6	(Austria) J Melzer	6	6
(Germany) A Beck	4	2
(Russia) E Korolev	6	3	4
2	(France) G Simon	4	6	6

Semifinals
6	(Austria) J Melzer	4	6^{3}
2	(France) G Simon	6	7^{7}
