= 2009 Interwetten Austrian Open Kitzbühel – Singles =

Singles
- 2009 Interwetten Austrian Open Kitzbühel

Final
- Champion: (Spain) Guillermo García-López
- Runner-up: (France) Julien Benneteau
- Score: 3–6, 7–6^{(7–1)}, 6–3

Details
- Draw: 32
- Seeds: 8

Events
Singles	Doubles
- Interwetten Austrian Open Kitzbühel

Juan Martín del Potro was the defending champion, but chose not to participate that year. Unseeded Guillermo García-López won the singles title.

== Seeds ==
1. (Russia) Nikolay Davydenko (withdrew)
2. (Austria) Jürgen Melzer (quarterfinals)
3. (Romania) Victor Hănescu (quarterfinals)
4. (France) Fabrice Santoro (first round)
5. (Argentina) Martín Vassallo Argüello (second round)
6. (France) Marc Gicquel (first round)
7. (Russia) Mikhail Youzhny (semifinals)
8. (Israel) Dudi Sela (first round)

== Draw ==
Key

- Q = Qualifier
- WC = Wild card
- LL = Lucky loser
- Alt = Alternate
- ITF = ITF entry
- PR = Protected ranking
- SR = Special ranking
- SE = Special exempt
- JE = Junior exempt
- JR = Junior Accelerator Programme entrant
- CO = College Accelerator Programme entrant
- NG = Next Gen Accelerator Program entrant
- w/o = Walkover
- r = Retired
- d = Defaulted

=== Finals ===
Semifinals
LL	(France) Julien Benneteau	6	6
(Spain) Óscar Hernández	3	4
(Spain) Guillermo García-López	6	1	7
7	(Russia) Mikhail Youzhny	3	6	6^{5}

Final
LL	(France) Julien Benneteau	6	6^{1}	3
(Spain) Guillermo García-López	3	7	6

=== Top half ===
First round
LL	(Chile) P Capdeville	3	2
(Argentina) D Junqueira	6	6
(Brazil) T Bellucci	4	4
WC	(Austria) D Köllerer	6	6
(Chile) N Massú	6	6
Q	(Czech Republic) R Vik	4	2
LL	(France) J Benneteau	7	6
8	(Israel) D Sela	5	1
4	(France) F Santoro	2	3
(Spain) Ó Hernández	6	6
(Czech Republic) J Hernych	7	3	5
WC	(Germany) A Beck	5	6	7
LL	(Spain) R Ramírez Hidalgo	6	6
Q	(Croatia) M Ančić	4	3
Q	(Argentina) JI Chela	5	6	6
6	(France) M Gicquel	7	3	0

Second round
(Argentina) D Junqueira	1	2
WC	(Austria) D Köllerer	6	6
(Chile) N Massú	1	7	6^{7}
LL	(France) J Benneteau	6	6^{4}	7
(Spain) Ó Hernández	7	6
WC	(Germany) A Beck	5	4
LL	(Spain) R Ramírez Hidalgo	3	2
Q	(Argentina) JI Chela	6	6

Quarterfinals
WC	(Austria) D Köllerer	2	7	0
LL	(France) J Benneteau	6	6^{5}	6
(Spain) Ó Hernández	6	6
Q	(Argentina) JI Chela	4	4

Semifinals
LL	(France) J Benneteau	6	6
(Spain) Ó Hernández	3	4

=== Bottom half ===
First round
5	(Argentina) M Vassallo Argüello	6	6
(Belgium) C Rochus	2	4
(Germany) B Phau	3	2
(Spain) G García-López	6	6
(Spain) M Granollers	7	6
(Russia) T Gabashvili	6^{11}	3
Q	(Ecuador) N Lapentti	7	3	5
3	(Romania) V Hănescu	6^{6}	6	7
7	(Russia) M Youzhny	6	7
(Spain) D Gimeno-Traver	2	6^{7}
WC	(Austria) S Koubek	7	6
(Germany) P Petzschner	6^{8}	4
(Chinese Taipei) Y-H Lu	6	5	1^{r}
(Argentina) A Calleri	3	7	0
(Portugal) F Gil	3	0
2	(Austria) J Melzer	6	6

Second round
5	(Argentina) M Vassallo Argüello	6	4	3
(Spain) G García-López	4	6	6
(Spain) M Granollers	1	6^{2}
3	(Romania) V Hănescu	6	7
7	(Russia) M Youzhny	6	6
WC	(Austria) S Koubek	2	4
(Argentina) A Calleri	4	5
2	(Austria) J Melzer	6	7

Quarterfinals
(Spain) G García-López	6	6
3	(Romania) V Hănescu	2	2
7	(Russia) M Youzhny	6	6
2	(Austria) J Melzer	4	4

Semifinals
(Spain) G García-López	6	1	7
7	(Russia) M Youzhny	3	6	6^{5}
