= 2009 Interwetten Austrian Open Kitzbühel – Doubles =

Doubles
- 2009 Interwetten Austrian Open Kitzbühel

Final
- Champions: (Brazil) Marcelo Melo (Brazil) André Sá
- Runners-up: (Romania) Andrei Pavel (Romania) Horia Tecău
- Score: 6–7^{(9–11)}, 6–2, [10–7]

Details
- Draw: 16
- Seeds: 4

Events
Singles	Doubles
- Interwetten Austrian Open Kitzbühel

== Seeds ==
1. (Poland) Mariusz Fyrstenberg / (Poland) Marcin Matkowski (quarterfinals)
2. (Brazil) Marcelo Melo / (Brazil) André Sá (champions)
3. (Spain) Marcel Granollers / (Brazil) Bruno Soares (first round)
4. (Czech Republic) František Čermák / (Slovakia) Michal Mertiňák (quarterfinals)

== Draw ==
Key

- Q = Qualifier
- WC = Wild card
- LL = Lucky loser
- Alt = Alternate
- ITF = ITF entry
- PR = Protected ranking
- SR = Special ranking
- SE = Special exempt
- JE = Junior exempt
- JR = Junior Accelerator Programme entrant
- CO = College Accelerator Programme entrant
- NG = Next Gen Accelerator Program entrant
- w/o = Walkover
- r = Retired
- d = Defaulted

First round
1	(Poland) M Fyrstenberg (Poland) M Matkowski	7	7
(United States) R Kendrick (Austria) D Köllerer	5	6^{2}
(Romania) A Pavel (Romania) H Tecău	7	3	[11]
(Romania) V Hănescu (Czech Republic) J Levinský	6^{5}	6	[9]
4	(Czech Republic) F Čermák (Slovakia) M Mertiňák	6	3	[10]
(United States) J Cerretani (Serbia) D Vemić	3	6	[2]
(Austria) J Knowle (Austria) J Melzer	6	6^{5}	[10]
(United States) E Butorac (Germany) P Petzschner	2	7	[8]
(Argentina) L Arnold Ker (Austria) O Marach	6	6^{5}	[10]
WC	(Germany) M Kohlmann (Austria) P Oswald	4	7	[8]
(Germany) C Kas (Austria) A Peya	6	6
3	(Spain) M Granollers (Brazil) B Soares	3	2
(Croatia) M Ančić (Russia) M Youzhny	2	4
(Sweden) S Aspelin (Australia) P Hanley	6	6
(France) M Gicquel (Belgium) C Rochus	2	4
2	(Brazil) M Melo (Brazil) A Sá	6	6

Quarterfinals
1	(Poland) M Fyrstenberg (Poland) M Matkowski	6	5	[7]
(Romania) A Pavel (Romania) H Tecău	4	7	[10]
4	(Czech Republic) F Čermák (Slovakia) M Mertiňák	2	4
(Austria) J Knowle (Austria) J Melzer	6	6
(Argentina) L Arnold Ker (Austria) O Marach	3	4
(Germany) C Kas (Austria) A Peya	6	6
(Sweden) S Aspelin (Australia) P Hanley	3	4
2	(Brazil) M Melo (Brazil) A Sá	6	6

Semifinals
(Romania) A Pavel (Romania) H Tecău	6^{1}	6	[15]
(Austria) J Knowle (Austria) J Melzer	7	3	[13]
(Germany) C Kas (Austria) A Peya	4	0
2	(Brazil) M Melo (Brazil) A Sá	6	6

Final
(Romania) A Pavel (Romania) H Tecău	7	2	[7]
2	(Brazil) M Melo (Brazil) A Sá	6^{9}	6	[10]
