= 2009 PTT Thailand Open – Doubles =

Doubles
- 2009 Thailand Open (ATP)

Final
- Champions: (United States) Eric Butorac; (United States) Rajeev Ram
- Runners-up: (Spain) Guillermo García López; (Germany) Mischa Zverev
- Score: 7–6^{(7–4)}, 6–3

Events
Singles	Doubles
← 2008 ·	Thailand Open (ATP)	· 2010 →

Lukáš Dlouhý and Leander Paes were the defending champions, but Paes decided not to participate that year. Dlouhý partnered with David Škoch, but they lost in the first round against Eric Butorac and Rajeev Ram. Butorac and Ram won in the final 7–6^{(7–4)}, 6–3, against Guillermo García López and Mischa Zverev.

== Seeds ==
1. (United States) Travis Parrott / (Slovakia) Filip Polášek (first round)
2. (Czech Republic) Lukáš Dlouhý / (Czech Republic) David Škoch (first round)
3. (Austria) Julian Knowle / (Austria) Jürgen Melzer (semifinals)
4. (South Africa) Jeff Coetzee / (South Africa) Rik de Voest (first round)

== Draw ==
=== Key ===
- Q = Qualifier
- WC = Wild card
- LL = Lucky loser
- Alt = Alternate
- SE = Special exempt
- PR = Protected ranking
- ITF = ITF entry
- JE = Junior exempt
- w/o = Walkover
- r = Retired
- d = Defaulted
- SR = Special ranking

=== Draw ===
First round

Quarterfinals

Semifinals

Final

1
- (United States) T Parrott
- (Slovakia) F Polášek
3
7^{11}
[7]

- (France) F Santoro
- (France) J-W Tsonga
6
6^{9}
[10]

- (France) F Santoro
- (France) J-W Tsonga
5
6
[10]

- (Germany) B Becker
- (Argentina) L Mayer
6
2
[10]

- (Germany) B Becker
- (Argentina) L Mayer
7
1
[6]

WC
- (Thailand) S Ratiwatana
- (Thailand) S Ratiwatana
3
6
[3]

- (France) F Santoro
- (France) J-W Tsonga
3
2

4
- (South Africa) J Coetzee
- (South Africa) R de Voest
4
7^{7}
[4]

- (Spain) G García López
- (Germany) M Zverev
6
6

- (Russia) M Safin
- (France) G Simon
6
6^{3}
[10]

- (Russia) M Safin
- (France) G Simon
2
3

- (Spain) G García López
- (Germany) M Zverev
6
3
[10]

- (Spain) G García López
- (Germany) M Zverev
6
6

- (Germany) A Beck
- (Germany) P Petzschner
4
6
[8]

- (Spain) G García López
- (Germany) M Zverev
6^{4}
3

- (Germany) M Kohlmann
- (Austria) A Peya
2
6
[10]

- (United States) E Butorac
- (United States) R Ram
7^{7}
6

WC
- (Thailand) P Srichaphan
- (Thailand) D Udomchoke
6
1
[6]

- (Germany) M Kohlmann
- (Austria) A Peya
2
6
[3]

ALT
- (Brazil) T Bellucci
- (Brazil) M Daniel
5
7
[2]

3
- (Austria) J Knowle
- (Austria) J Melzer
6
4
[10]

3
- (Austria) J Knowle
- (Austria) J Melzer
7
5
[10]

3
- (Austria) J Knowle
- (Austria) J Melzer
7^{7}
3
[7]

- (United Kingdom) R Hutchins
- (Romania) H Tecău
4
6
[10]

- (United States) E Butorac
- (United States) R Ram
6^{2}
6
[10]

- (Germany) C Kas
- (Serbia) V Troicki
6
3
[6]

- (United Kingdom) R Hutchins
- (Romania) H Tecău
6
4
[6]

- (United States) E Butorac
- (United States) R Ram
4
6
[10]

- (United States) E Butorac
- (United States) R Ram
2
6
[10]

2
- (Czech Republic) L Dlouhý
- (Czech Republic) D Škoch
6
3
[5]
