= 2021 Antalya Open – Singles =

Singles
- 2021 Antalya Open

Final
- Champion: (Australia) Alex de Minaur
- Runner-up: (Kazakhstan) Alexander Bublik
- Score: 2–0 ret.

Details
- Draw: 32 (6 Q / 3 WC )
- Seeds: 8

Events
Singles	Doubles
← 2019 ·	Antalya Open	· 2022 →

Lorenzo Sonego was the defending champion, but chose not to participate. Alex de Minaur defeated Alexander Bublik in the final, 2–0, after Bublik retired with an ankle injury.

== Seeds ==
1. (Italy) Matteo Berrettini (quarterfinals)
2. (Belgium) David Goffin (semifinals)
3. (Italy) Fabio Fognini (second round)
4. (Australia) Alex de Minaur (champion)
5. (Germany) Jan-Lennard Struff (quarterfinals)
6. (Georgia (country)) Nikoloz Basilashvili (quarterfinals)
7. (Serbia) Miomir Kecmanović (first round)
8. (Kazakhstan) Alexander Bublik (final, retired)

== Draw ==
=== Key ===
- Q = Qualifier
- WC = Wild card
- LL = Lucky loser
- Alt = Alternate
- SE = Special exempt
- PR = Protected ranking
- ITF = ITF entry
- JE = Junior exempt
- w/o = Walkover
- r = Retired
- d = Defaulted
- SR = Special ranking

=== Finals ===
Semifinals
8	(Kazakhstan) Alexander Bublik	6	6^{4}	6
(France) Jérémy Chardy	4	7^{7}	3
4	(Australia) Alex de Minaur	6	3	6
2	(Belgium) David Goffin	4	6	2

Final
8	(Kazakhstan) Alexander Bublik	0^{r}
4	(Australia) Alex de Minaur	2

=== Top half ===
First round
1	(Italy) M Berrettini	6	6
WC	(Turkey) E Kırkın	0	4
(Serbia) L Đere	1	2^{r}
Q	(Bulgaria) D Kuzmanov	6	3
(France) T Lamasine	7^{8}	6
(Belarus) E Gerasimov	6^{6}	2
(Italy) S Caruso	3	3
8	(Kazakhstan) A Bublik	6	6
3	(Italy) F Fognini	6	7^{7}
Q	(Czech Republic) M Vrbenský	4	6^{4}
(France) J Chardy	6	6
(Moldova) R Albot	3	4
Q	(Slovakia) A Molčan	5	4
(France) H Grenier	7	6
Q	(Russia) P Kotov	4	3
5	(Germany) J-L Struff	6	6

Second round
1	(Italy) M Berrettini	6	6
Q	(Bulgaria) D Kuzmanov	2	3
(France) T Lamasine	2	4
8	(Kazakhstan) A Bublik	6	6
3	(Italy) F Fognini	6^{4}	7^{7}	6^{5}
(France) J Chardy	7^{7}	6^{1}	7^{7}
(France) H Grenier
5	(Germany) J-L Struff	w/o

Quarterfinals
1	(Italy) M Berrettini	6^{6}	4
8	(Kazakhstan) A Bublik	7^{8}	6
(France) J Chardy	4	6	7^{10}
5	(Germany) J-L Struff	6	2	6^{8}

Semifinals
8	(Kazakhstan) A Bublik	6	6^{4}	6
(France) J Chardy	4	7^{7}	3

=== Bottom half ===
First round
6	(Georgia (country)) N Basilashvili	4	7	6
(Italy) A Arnaboldi	6	5	1
WC	(Turkey) A Çelikbilek	7^{9}	7
(Poland) K Żuk	6^{7}	5
Q	(Bulgaria) A Andreev	6	6
WC	(Turkey) M İlhan	4	3
(Tunisia) M Jaziri	2	1
4	(Australia) A de Minaur	6	6
7	(Serbia) M Kecmanović	6	4	0
(Italy) S Travaglia	1	6	6
(Finland) E Ruusuvuori	6	7^{7}
(Czech Republic) J Veselý	3	6^{4}
Q	(Germany) M Bachinger	6	3	1^{r}
(Spain) N Kuhn	3	6	4
(France) P-H Herbert	6	5	0
2	(Belgium) D Goffin	3	7	6

Second round
6	(Georgia (country)) N Basilashvili	7^{7}	6
WC	(Turkey) A Çelikbilek	6^{1}	4
Q	(Bulgaria) A Andreev	3	1
4	(Australia) A de Minaur	6	6
(Italy) S Travaglia	7^{7}	6
(Finland) E Ruusuvuori	6^{5}	3
(Spain) N Kuhn	0	2
2	(Belgium) D Goffin	6	6

Quarterfinals
6	(Georgia (country)) N Basilashvili	2	4
4	(Australia) A de Minaur	6	6
(Italy) S Travaglia	3	2
2	(Belgium) D Goffin	6	6

Semifinals
4	(Australia) A de Minaur	6	3	6
2	(Belgium) D Goffin	4	6	2

== Qualifying ==
=== Seeds ===
1. (Serbia) Peđa Krstin (first round)
2. (Russia) Pavel Kotov (qualified)
3. (Slovenia) Blaž Kavčič (qualifying competition)
4. (Italy) Andrea Pellegrino (qualifying competition)
5. (Germany) Matthias Bachinger (qualified)
6. (Spain) Roberto Ortega Olmedo (first round)
7. (Slovakia) Lukáš Klein (first round)
8. (Bulgaria) Dimitar Kuzmanov (qualified)
9. (India) Sasikumar Mukund (first round)
10. (Austria) Lucas Miedler (qualifying competition)
11. (Czech Republic) Michael Vrbenský (qualified)
12. (Slovakia) Alex Molčan (qualified)

=== Qualifiers ===
1. (Czech Republic) Michael Vrbenský
2. (Russia) Pavel Kotov
3. (Slovakia) Alex Molčan
4. (Bulgaria) Dimitar Kuzmanov
5. (Germany) Matthias Bachinger
6. (Bulgaria) Adrian Andreev

=== Qualifying draw ===
==== First qualifier ====
First round
1	(Serbia) Peđa Krstin	2	1
WC	(Turkey) Mert Naci Türker	6	6
(Ukraine) Vitaliy Sachko	5	2
11	(Czech Republic) Michael Vrbenský	7	6

Qualifying competition
WC	(Turkey) Mert Naci Türker	4	3
11	(Czech Republic) Michael Vrbenský	6	6

==== Second qualifier ====
First round
2	(Russia) Pavel Kotov	6	0
WC	(Turkey) Umut Akkoyun	2	0^{r}
(Finland) Harri Heliövaara	6	7
9	(India) Sasikumar Mukund	4	5

Qualifying competition
2	(Russia) Pavel Kotov	6	6
(Finland) Harri Heliövaara	2	2

==== Third qualifier ====
First round
3	(Slovenia) Blaž Kavčič	6	6
WC	(Turkey) Togan Tokaç	2	2
(Kazakhstan) Andrey Golubev	2	5
12	(Slovakia) Alex Molčan	6	7

Qualifying competition
3	(Slovenia) Blaž Kavčič	6	4	5
12	(Slovakia) Alex Molčan	1	6	7

==== Fourth qualifier ====
First round
4	(Italy) Andrea Pellegrino	3	6	6
Alt	(Turkey) Cengiz Aksu	6	2	0
(Bosnia and Herzegovina) Mirza Bašić	3	1
8	(Bulgaria) Dimitar Kuzmanov	6	6

Qualifying competition
4	(Italy) Andrea Pellegrino	6	6^{11}	5
8	(Bulgaria) Dimitar Kuzmanov	4	7^{13}	7

==== Fifth qualifier ====
First round
5	(Germany) Matthias Bachinger	6	7
(Ukraine) Vladyslav Orlov	1	5
(Bulgaria) Alexandar Lazarov	6	3	3
10	(Austria) Lucas Miedler	1	6	6

Qualifying competition
5	(Germany) Matthias Bachinger	6	6
10	(Austria) Lucas Miedler	4	1

==== Sixth qualifier ====
First round
6	(Spain) Roberto Ortega Olmedo	5	1
(Italy) Andrea Vavassori	7	6
WC	(Bulgaria) Adrian Andreev	6	7^{9}
7	(Slovakia) Lukáš Klein	3	6^{7}

Qualifying competition
(Italy) Andrea Vavassori	4	6^{5}
WC	(Bulgaria) Adrian Andreev	6	7^{7}
