= 2019 Antalya Open =

- Date: June 23–29
- Edition: 2nd
- Category: ATP Tour 250 series
- Draw: 28S/16D
- Prize money: €426,145
- Surface: Grass
- Location: Antalya, Turkey

Champions

Singles
- (Italy) Lorenzo Sonego

Doubles
- (Israel) Jonathan Erlich / (New Zealand) Artem Sitak
← 2018 ·	Antalya Open	· 2021 →

The 2019 Antalya Open (also known as the Turkish Airlines Open Antalya for sponsorship reasons) was a men's tennis tournament played on grass courts. It was the 3rd edition of the event, and part of the ATP Tour 250 series of the 2019 ATP Tour. It took place at the Kaya Palazzo Resort in Belek, Antalya Province, Turkey, from June 23–29.

== Singles main-draw entrants ==
=== Seeds ===
Country	Player	Rank^{1}	Seed
FRA	Benoît Paire	28	1
FRA	Adrian Mannarino	34	2
AUS	Jordan Thompson	46	3
ESP	Pablo Carreño Busta	58	4
BIH	Damir Džumhur	62	5
FRA	Ugo Humbert	64	6
ITA	Andreas Seppi	68	7
POR	João Sousa	71	8

- Rankings are as of June 17, 2019.

=== Other entrants ===
The following players received wildcards into the singles main draw:

- (Turkey) Altuğ Çelikbilek
- (Turkey) Cem İlkel
- (Turkey) Ergi Kırkın

The following players received entry using a protected ranking into the singles main draw:

- (Slovakia) Jozef Kovalík
- (Serbia) Janko Tipsarević

The following players received entry from the qualifying draw:

- (United States) JC Aragone
- (Belgium) Steve Darcis
- (Germany) Kevin Krawietz
- (Serbia) Viktor Troicki

=== Withdrawals ===
Before the tournament

- (Lithuania) Ričardas Berankis → replaced by (United States) Bradley Klahn

=== Retirements ===
- (Bosnia and Herzegovina) Damir Džumhur

== Doubles main-draw entrants ==
=== Seeds ===
Country	Player	Country	Player	Rank^{1}	Seed
GER	Kevin Krawietz	GER	Andreas Mies	43	1
BRA	Marcelo Demoliner	IND	Divij Sharan	95	2
MEX	Santiago González	PAK	Aisam-ul-Haq Qureshi	109	3
CZE	Roman Jebavý	AUT	Philipp Oswald	119	4

- Rankings are as of June 17, 2019.

=== Other entrants ===
The following pairs received wildcards into the doubles main draw:

- (Turkey) Sarp Ağabigün / (Turkey) Yankı Erel
- (Turkey) Tuna Altuna / (Turkey) Cem İlkel

== Champions ==
=== Singles ===
- (Italy) Lorenzo Sonego def. (Serbia) Miomir Kecmanović, 6–7^{(5–7)}, 7–6^{(7–5)}, 6–1

=== Doubles ===
- (Israel) Jonathan Erlich / (New Zealand) Artem Sitak def. (Croatia) Ivan Dodig / (Slovakia) Filip Polášek, 6–3, 6–4
