= 2021 Antalya Open – Doubles =

Doubles
- 2021 Antalya Open

Final
- Champions: (Croatia) Nikola Mektić (Croatia) Mate Pavić
- Runners-up: (Croatia) Ivan Dodig (Slovakia) Filip Polášek
- Score: 6–2, 6–4

Events
Singles	Doubles
← 2019 ·	Antalya Open	· 2022 →

Jonathan Erlich and Artem Sitak were the defending champions, but Sitak chose not to participate this year. Erlich partnered up with Andrei Vasilevski, but they lost to Jérémy Chardy and Fabrice Martin in the first round.

Nikola Mektić and Mate Pavić won the title, defeating Ivan Dodig and Filip Polášek in the final, 6–2, 6–4.

== Seeds ==
1. (Croatia) Nikola Mektić / (Croatia) Mate Pavić (champions)
2. (Croatia) Ivan Dodig / (Slovakia) Filip Polášek (final)
3. (France) Jérémy Chardy / (France) Fabrice Martin (semifinals)
4. (Serbia) Nikola Ćaćić / (Denmark) Frederik Nielsen (first round)

== Draw ==
=== Key ===
- Q = Qualifier
- WC = Wild card
- LL = Lucky loser
- Alt = Alternate
- SE = Special exempt
- PR = Protected ranking
- ITF = ITF entry
- JE = Junior exempt
- w/o = Walkover
- r = Retired
- d = Defaulted
- SR = Special ranking

=== Draw ===
First round
1	(Croatia) N Mektić (Croatia) M Pavić	6	5	[10]
(Czech Republic) J Veselý (Austria) T-S Weissborn	4	7	[6]
(Georgia (country)) N Basilashvili (Germany) A Begemann	6	6
WC	(Turkey) U Akkoyun (Turkey) MN Türker	2	3
4	(Serbia) N Ćaćić (Denmark) F Nielsen	2	6	[5]
(Italy) S Caruso (Italy) A Vavassori	6	1	[10]
(Croatia) I Sabanov (Croatia) M Sabanov	4	5
(Switzerland) L Margaroli (Romania) F Mergea	6	7
(Kazakhstan) A Bublik (Kazakhstan) A Golubev	6	0	[12]
(Belgium) D Goffin (France) P-H Herbert	3	6	[10]
(Israel) J Erlich (Belarus) A Vasilevski	3	6^{1}
3	(France) J Chardy (France) F Martin	6	7^{7}
(Finland) H Heliövaara (Finland) E Ruusuvuori	6	6
(Ukraine) D Molchanov (Kazakhstan) A Nedovyesov	3	2
WC	(Turkey) T Altuna (Turkey) A Çelikbilek	5	2
2	(Croatia) I Dodig (Slovakia) F Polášek	7	6

Quarterfinals
1	(Croatia) N Mektić (Croatia) M Pavić	6	6
(Georgia (country)) N Basilashvili (Germany) A Begemann	0	1
(Italy) S Caruso (Italy) A Vavassori	6	6
(Switzerland) L Margaroli (Romania) F Mergea	1	0
(Kazakhstan) A Bublik (Kazakhstan) A Golubev	1	1
3	(France) J Chardy (France) F Martin	6	6
(Finland) H Heliövaara (Finland) E Ruusuvuori	6	4	[9]
2	(Croatia) I Dodig (Slovakia) F Polášek	3	6	[11]

Semifinals
1	(Croatia) N Mektić (Croatia) M Pavić	6	6
(Italy) S Caruso (Italy) A Vavassori	1	1
3	(France) J Chardy (France) F Martin	3	1
2	(Croatia) I Dodig (Slovakia) F Polášek	6	6

Final
1	(Croatia) N Mektić (Croatia) M Pavić	6	6
2	(Croatia) I Dodig (Slovakia) F Polášek	2	4
