= 2009 International German Open =

Tennis tournament

- Date: 20–26 July
- Edition: 103rd
- Category: ATP World Tour 500
- Draw: 48S / 16D
- Prize money: €1,000,000
- Surface: Clay / outdoor
- Location: Hamburg, Germany

Champions

Singles
- (Russia) Nikolay Davydenko

Doubles
- (Sweden) Simon Aspelin / (Australia) Paul Hanley
- International German Open

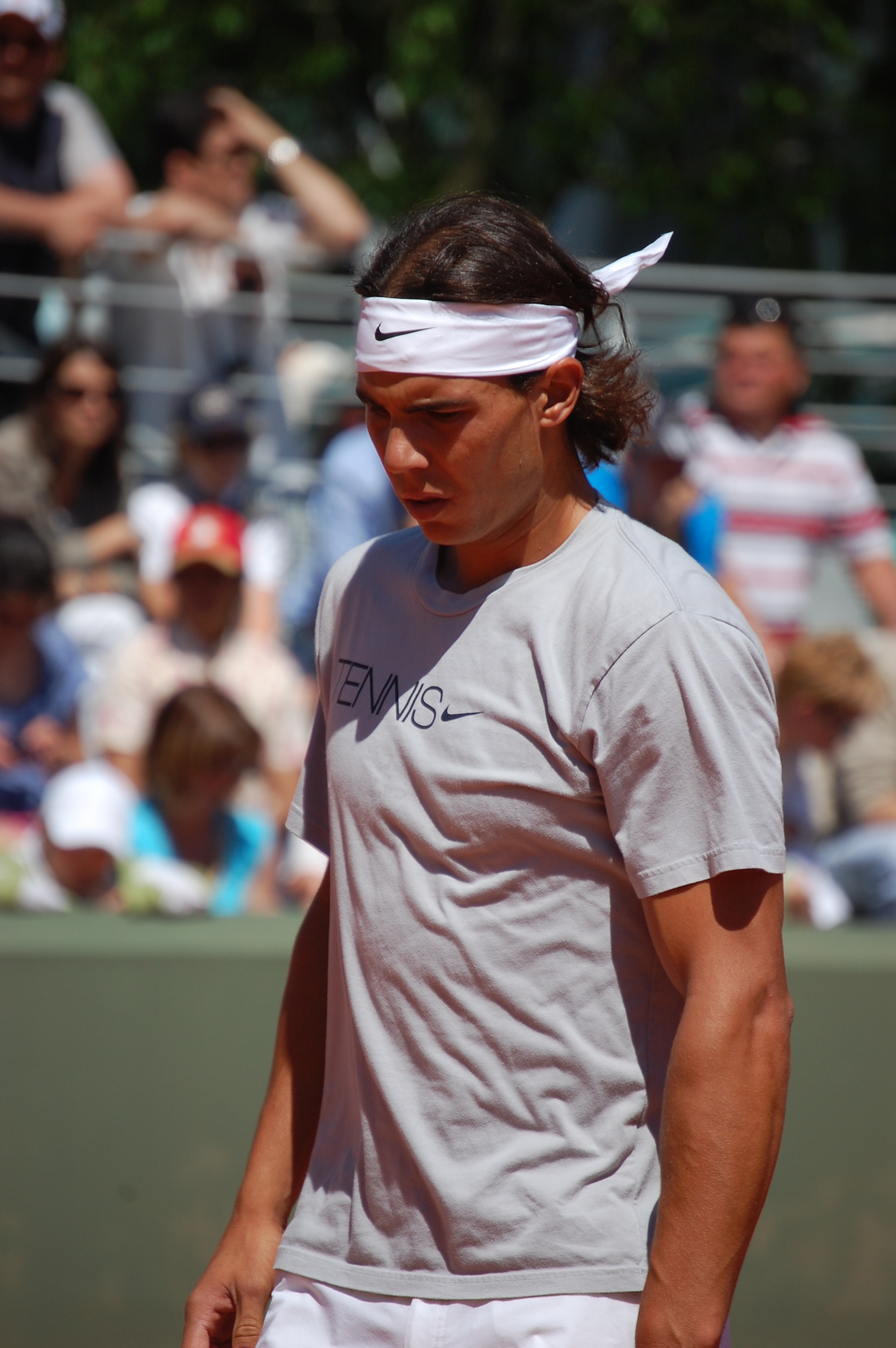
ATP World Tour No. 2 Rafael Nadal did not defend his 2008 Hamburg title

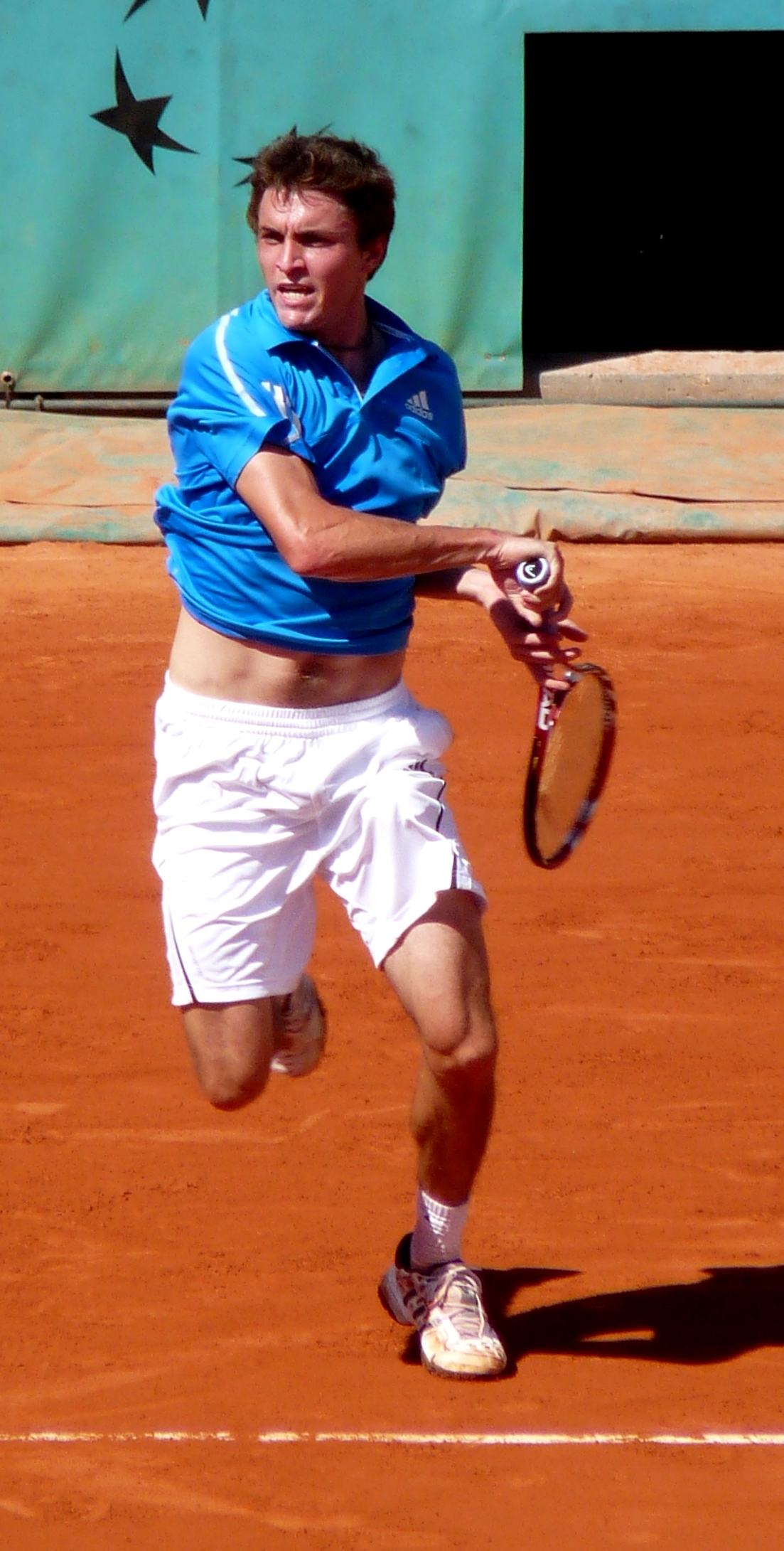
ATP World Tour No. 7 Gilles Simon headlined the singles field in Hamburg

The 2009 International German Open was a men's tennis tournament played on outdoor red clay courts. It was the 103rd edition of the event known that year as the International German Open and was part of the ATP World Tour 500 series of the 2009 ATP World Tour. It took place at the Am Rothenbaum in Hamburg, Germany, from 20 July through 26 July 2009. Second-seeded Nikolay Davydenko won the singles title.

== Finals ==
=== Singles ===
(Russia) Nikolay Davydenko defeated (France) Paul-Henri Mathieu, 6–4, 6–2

- It was Davydenko's first title of the year, and his 15th overall.

=== Doubles ===
(Sweden) Simon Aspelin / (Australia) Paul Hanley defeated (Brazil) Marcelo Melo / (Slovakia) Filip Polášek, 6–3, 6–3

== ATP entrants ==
=== Seeds ===
Player	Nation	Ranking*	Seeding
Gilles Simon	FRA	7	1
Nikolay Davydenko	RUS	11	2
Robin Söderling	SWE	12	3
Tommy Robredo	ESP	16	4
Stanislas Wawrinka	SUI	19	5
David Ferrer	ESP	23	6
Igor Andreev	RUS	25	7
Philipp Kohlschreiber	GER	26	8
Jürgen Melzer	AUT	28	9
Viktor Troicki	SRB	29	10
Victor Hănescu	ROU	33	11
José Acasuso	ARG	37	12
Paul-Henri Mathieu	FRA	39	13
Nicolás Almagro	ESP	41	14
Jérémy Chardy	FRA	43	15
Mischa Zverev	GER	45	16

*Seedings based on 13 July 2009 rankings.

=== Other entrants ===
The following players received wildcards into the singles main draw

- (Germany) Daniel Brands
- (Germany) Florian Mayer
- (Germany) Simon Greul
- (Germany) Kevin Krawietz

The following players received entry from the qualifying draw:

- (Italy) Potito Starace
- (Romania) Victor Crivoi
- (Uruguay) Pablo Cuevas
- (Russia) Evgeny Korolev
- (Spain) Pere Riba
- (Spain) Marcel Granollers-Pujol
