= 2018 Antalya Open =

- Date: June 24–30
- Edition: 2nd
- Category: ATP World Tour 250 series
- Draw: 28S/16D
- Prize money: €426,145
- Surface: Grass
- Location: Antalya, Turkey

Champions

Singles
- (Bosnia and Herzegovina) Damir Džumhur

Doubles
- (Brazil) Marcelo Demoliner / (Mexico) Santiago González
← 2017 ·	Antalya Open	· 2019 →

The 2018 Antalya Open (also known as the Turkish Airlines Open Antalya for sponsorship reasons) was a men's tennis tournament played on grass courts. It was the 2nd edition of the event, and part of the ATP World Tour 250 series of the 2018 ATP World Tour. It took place at the Kaya Palazzo Resort in Belek, Antalya Province, Turkey, from June 24–30.

== Singles main-draw entrants ==
=== Seeds ===
Country	Player	Rank^{1}	Seed
FRA	Adrian Mannarino	26	1
BIH	Damir Džumhur	29	2
ESP	Fernando Verdasco	33	3
FRA	Gaël Monfils	42	4
NED	Robin Haase	43	5
POR	João Sousa	47	6
JPN	Yūichi Sugita	52	7
SRB	Dušan Lajović	56	8

- Rankings are as of June 11, 2018.

=== Other entrants ===
The following players received wildcards into the singles main draw:

- (Turkey) Cem İlkel
- (France) Gaël Monfils
- (Spain) Fernando Verdasco

The following players received entry from the qualifying draw:

- (Japan) Taro Daniel
- (Slovakia) Filip Horanský
- (Slovenia) Blaž Kavčič
- (Russia) Mikhail Youzhny

=== Withdrawals ===
Before the tournament

- (Uruguay) Pablo Cuevas → replaced by (Australia) Jordan Thompson
- (Chinese Taipei) Lu Yen-hsun → replaced by (Bosnia and Herzegovina) Mirza Bašić
- (Germany) Maximilian Marterer → replaced by (Cyprus) Marcos Baghdatis
- (Canada) Vasek Pospisil → replaced by (Lithuania) Ričardas Berankis

== Doubles main-draw entrants ==
=== Seeds ===
Country	Player	Country	Player	Rank^{1}	Seed
PAK	Aisam-ul-Haq Qureshi	NED	Jean-Julien Rojer	43	1
BLR	Max Mirnyi	AUT	Philipp Oswald	81	2
NED	Sander Arends	NED	Matwé Middelkoop	99	3
ARG	Andrés Molteni	CHI	Hans Podlipnik Castillo	111	4

- Rankings are as of June 18, 2018.

=== Other entrants ===
The following pairs received wildcards into the doubles main draw:

- (Turkey) Tuna Altuna / (Russia) Konstantin Kravchuk
- (Turkey) Koray Kırcı / (Turkey) Ergi Kırkın

== Champions ==
=== Singles ===
- (Bosnia and Herzegovina) Damir Džumhur def. (France) Adrian Mannarino, 6–1, 1–6, 6–1

=== Doubles ===
- (Brazil) Marcelo Demoliner / (Mexico) Santiago González def. (Netherlands) Sander Arends / (Netherlands) Matwé Middelkoop, 7–5, 6–7^{(6–8)}, [10–8]
