= 2011 International German Open – Singles qualifying =

This article displays the qualifying draw of the 2011 International German Open.

== Players ==
=== Seeds ===
1. (Czech Republic) Lukáš Rosol (qualifying competition) (Lucky loser)
2. (Spain) Albert Ramos (qualified)
3. (Turkey) Marsel İlhan (qualified)
4. (Italy) Simone Bolelli (qualified)
5. (Netherlands) Thomas Schoorel (first round)
6. (Slovakia) Martin Kližan (first round)
7. (Argentina) Facundo Bagnis (first round)
8. (Spain) Guillermo Olaso (qualified)
9. (Germany) Bastian Knittel (qualified)
10. (Spain) Iván Navarro (qualifying competition)
11. (Romania) Victor Crivoi (qualified)
12. (Croatia) Antonio Veić (first round)

=== Qualifiers ===
1. (Romania) Victor Crivoi
2. (Spain) Albert Ramos
3. (Turkey) Marsel İlhan
4. (Italy) Simone Bolelli
5. (Spain) Guillermo Olaso
6. (Germany) Bastian Knittel

== Qualifying draw ==
=== First qualifier ===
First round
1	(Czech Republic) Lukáš Rosol	7^{7}	6
(Czech Republic) Jan Mertl	6^{3}	2
(Germany) Jan-Lennard Struff	7^{7}	5	0
11	(Romania) Victor Crivoi	6^{4}	7	6

Qualifying competition
1	(Czech Republic) Lukáš Rosol	7^{9}	6^{5}	6^{3}
11	(Romania) Victor Crivoi	6^{7}	7^{7}	7^{7}

=== Second qualifier ===
First round
2	(Spain) Albert Ramos	6	6
(Germany) Jaan-Frederik Brunken	0	3
WC	(Germany) Nils Langer	7	6
7	(Argentina) Facundo Bagnis	5	4

Qualifying competition
2	(Spain) Albert Ramos	6^{4}	6	6
WC	(Germany) Nils Langer	7^{7}	3	4

=== Third qualifier ===
First round
3	(Turkey) Marsel İlhan	6	7^{12}
WC	(Croatia) Borut Puc	4	6^{10}
(Portugal) João Sousa	6	3	4
10	(Spain) Iván Navarro	4	6	6

Qualifying competition
3	(Turkey) Marsel İlhan	6	6
10	(Spain) Iván Navarro	4	3

=== Fourth qualifier ===
First round
4	(Italy) Simone Bolelli	6	6
WC	(Germany) Tobias Hinzmann	0	3
(Portugal) Leonardo Tavares	6	3	6
12	(Croatia) Antonio Veić	4	6	4

Qualifying competition
4	(Italy) Simone Bolelli	6	5	7
(Portugal) Leonardo Tavares	1	7	5

=== Fifth qualifier ===
First round
5	(Netherlands) Thomas Schoorel	7^{7}	1	6^{4}
(Argentina) Pablo Galdón	6^{2}	6	7^{7}
(Germany) Andre Begemann	6^{10}	3
8	(Spain) Guillermo Olaso	7^{12}	6

Qualifying competition
(Argentina) Pablo Galdón	6^{5}	3
8	(Spain) Guillermo Olaso	7^{7}	6

=== Sixth qualifier ===
First round
6	(Slovakia) Martin Kližan	2	0
(Czech Republic) Jan Hernych	6	6
WC	(Germany) Kevin Krawietz	4	4
9	(Germany) Bastian Knittel	6	6

Qualifying competition
(Czech Republic) Jan Hernych	6	1	0
9	(Germany) Bastian Knittel	2	6	6
