= 2017 Antalya Open =

- Date: 25 June – 1 July
- Edition: 1st
- Category: ATP World Tour 250 series
- Draw: 28S / 16D
- Prize money: €439,005
- Surface: Grass
- Location: Antalya, Turkey

Champions

Singles
- (Japan) Yūichi Sugita

Doubles
- (Sweden) Robert Lindstedt / (Pakistan) Aisam-ul-Haq Qureshi
Antalya Open	· 2018 →

The 2017 Antalya Open was a men's tennis tournament played on grass courts. It was the 1st edition of the Antalya Open, and part of the ATP World Tour 250 series of the 2017 ATP World Tour. It took place at the Kaya Palazzo Resort in Belek, Antalya Province, Turkey, from June 25–July 1.

== Singles main-draw entrants ==
=== Seeds ===
Country	Player	Rank^{1}	Seed
AUT	Dominic Thiem	8	1
ITA	Paolo Lorenzi	33	2
ESP	Fernando Verdasco	34	3
ESP	David Ferrer	37	4
~~RUS~~	~~Karen Khachanov~~	~~38~~	~~5~~
SRB	Viktor Troicki	39	6
CRO	Borna Ćorić	43	7
SVK	Martin Kližan	46	8

- Rankings are as of June 19, 2017.

=== Other entrants ===
The following players received wildcards into the singles main draw:

- (Spain) David Ferrer
- (Turkey) Marsel İlhan
- (Turkey) Cem İlkel

The following players received entry from the qualifying draw:

- (Australia) Matthew Ebden
- (Poland) Kamil Majchrzak
- (India) Ramkumar Ramanathan
- (Egypt) Mohamed Safwat

The following players received entry as lucky losers:

- (Germany) Daniel Altmaier
- (South Africa) Lloyd Harris

=== Withdrawals ===
Before the tournament

- (South Korea) Chung Hyeon →replaced by (Germany) Daniel Altmaier
- (Russia) Karen Khachanov →replaced by (South Africa) Lloyd Harris
- (Chinese Taipei) Lu Yen-hsun →replaced by (Dominican Republic) Víctor Estrella Burgos

=== Retirements ===
- (Cyprus) Marcos Baghdatis
- (Slovakia) Martin Kližan

== Doubles main-draw entrants ==
=== Seeds ===
Country	Player	Country	Player	Rank^{1}	Seed
SWE	Robert Lindstedt	PAK	Aisam-ul-Haq Qureshi	69	1
AUT	Oliver Marach	CRO	Mate Pavić	70	2
MEX	Santiago González	USA	Scott Lipsky	103	3
IND	Leander Paes	CAN	Adil Shamasdin	104	4

- Rankings are as of June 19, 2017.

=== Other entrants ===
The following pairs received wildcards into the doubles main draw:

- (Turkey) Tuna Altuna / (Spain) David Ferrer
- (Turkey) Sarp Ağabigün / (Turkey) Altuğ Çelikbilek

The following pair received entry as alternates:

- (Dominican Republic) Víctor Estrella Burgos / (Italy) Andreas Seppi

=== Withdrawals ===
- (Belgium) Steve Darcis

== Champions ==
=== Singles ===
- (Japan) Yūichi Sugita def. (France) Adrian Mannarino, 6–1, 7–6^{(7–4)}

=== Doubles ===
- (Sweden) Robert Lindstedt / (Pakistan) Aisam-ul-Haq Qureshi def. (Austria) Oliver Marach / (Croatia) Mate Pavić, 7–5, 4–1 ret.
