= 2017 Antalya Open – Doubles =

Doubles
- 2017 Antalya Open

Final
- Champions: (Sweden) Robert Lindstedt (Pakistan) Aisam-ul-Haq Qureshi
- Runners-up: (Austria) Oliver Marach (Croatia) Mate Pavić
- Score: 7–5, 4–1 ret.

Events
Singles	Doubles
Antalya Open	· 2018 →

This was the first edition of the tournament.

Robert Lindstedt and Aisam-ul-Haq Qureshi won the title after Oliver Marach and Mate Pavić retired trailing 5–7, 1–4 in the final.

== Seeds ==
1. (Sweden) Robert Lindstedt / (Pakistan) Aisam-ul-Haq Qureshi (champions)
2. (Austria) Oliver Marach / (Croatia) Mate Pavić (final, retired)
3. (Mexico) Santiago González / (United States) Scott Lipsky (first round)
4. (India) Leander Paes / (Canada) Adil Shamasdin (semifinals)

== Draw ==
=== Key ===
- Q = Qualifier
- WC = Wild card
- LL = Lucky loser
- Alt = Alternate
- SE = Special exempt
- PR = Protected ranking
- ITF = ITF entry
- JE = Junior exempt
- w/o = Walkover
- r = Retired
- d = Defaulted
- SR = Special ranking

=== Draw ===
First round
1	(Sweden) R Lindstedt (Pakistan) A-u-H Qureshi	6	7^{7}
(Brazil) R Dutra Silva (Italy) P Lorenzi	3	6^{4}
(Czech Republic) R Jebavý (Slovakia) M Kližan	7^{7}	4	[3]
(United States) N Monroe (New Zealand) A Sitak	6^{2}	6	[10]
3	(Mexico) S González (United States) S Lipsky	4	4
(Israel) J Erlich (Croatia) N Mektić	6	6
(New Zealand) M Daniell (Brazil) M Demoliner	4	6^{1}
PR	(Germany) P Petzschner (Austria) A Peya	6	7^{7}
WC	(Turkey) S Ağabigün (Turkey) A Çelikbilek	3	5
(Argentina) C Berlocq (Portugal) J Sousa	6	7
(Netherlands) W Koolhof (Netherlands) M Middelkoop	6	5	[9]
4	(India) L Paes (Canada) A Shamasdin	3	7	[11]
WC	(Turkey) T Altuna (Spain) D Ferrer	6^{4}	2
(India) P Raja (India) D Sharan	7^{7}	6
Alt	(Dominican Republic) V Estrella Burgos (Italy) A Seppi	3	2
2	(Austria) O Marach (Croatia) M Pavić	6	6

Quarterfinals
1	(Sweden) R Lindstedt (Pakistan) A-u-H Qureshi	3	7^{7}	[10]
(United States) N Monroe (New Zealand) A Sitak	6	6^{4}	[7]
(Israel) J Erlich (Croatia) N Mektić	6	7^{7}
PR	(Germany) P Petzschner (Austria) A Peya	3	6^{3}
(Argentina) C Berlocq (Portugal) J Sousa	1	2
4	(India) L Paes (Canada) A Shamasdin	6	6
(India) P Raja (India) D Sharan	6^{9}	7^{7}	[4]
2	(Austria) O Marach (Croatia) M Pavić	7^{11}	6^{4}	[10]

Semifinals
1	(Sweden) R Lindstedt (Pakistan) A-u-H Qureshi	6	3	[12]
(Israel) J Erlich (Croatia) N Mektić	3	6	[10]
4	(India) L Paes (Canada) A Shamasdin	4	4
2	(Austria) O Marach (Croatia) M Pavić	6	6

Final
1	(Sweden) R Lindstedt (Pakistan) A-u-H Qureshi	7	4
2	(Austria) O Marach (Croatia) M Pavić	5	1^{r}
