= 2019 Antalya Open – Doubles =

Doubles
- 2019 Antalya Open

Final
- Champions: (Israel) Jonathan Erlich (New Zealand) Artem Sitak
- Runners-up: (Croatia) Ivan Dodig (Slovakia) Filip Polášek
- Score: 6–3, 6–4

Events
Singles	Doubles
← 2018 ·	Antalya Open	· 2021 →

Marcelo Demoliner and Santiago González were the defending champions, but chose not to participate together. Demoliner played alongside Divij Sharan, but lost in the quarterfinals to Denys Molchanov and Igor Zelenay. González teamed up with Aisam-ul-Haq Qureshi, but lost in the first round to Ivan Dodig and Filip Polášek.

Jonathan Erlich and Artem Sitak won the title, defeating Dodig and Polášek in the final, 6–3, 6–4.

== Seeds ==
1. (Germany) Kevin Krawietz / (Germany) Andreas Mies (first round)
2. (Brazil) Marcelo Demoliner / (India) Divij Sharan (quarterfinals)
3. (Mexico) Santiago González / (Pakistan) Aisam-ul-Haq Qureshi (first round)
4. (Czech Republic) Roman Jebavý / (Austria) Philipp Oswald (semifinals)

== Draw ==
=== Key ===
- Q = Qualifier
- WC = Wild card
- LL = Lucky loser
- Alt = Alternate
- SE = Special exempt
- PR = Protected ranking
- ITF = ITF entry
- JE = Junior exempt
- w/o = Walkover
- r = Retired
- d = Defaulted
- SR = Special ranking

=== Draw ===
First round
1	(Germany) K Krawietz (Germany) A Mies	3	6^{3}
(Israel) J Erlich (New Zealand) A Sitak	6	7^{7}
(Bosnia and Herzegovina) D Džumhur (Australia) M Ebden	6^{6}	3
(Sweden) R Lindstedt (Germany) T Pütz	7^{8}	6
4	(Czech Republic) R Jebavý (Austria) P Oswald	6	6
WC	(Turkey) S Ağabigün (Turkey) Y Erel	2	1
(Netherlands) S Arends (Netherlands) M Middelkoop	3	4
(India) L Paes (France) B Paire	6	6
(Chinese Taipei) C-p Hsieh (Indonesia) C Rungkat	3	4
(Australia) L Saville (Australia) J Thompson	6	6
(Croatia) I Dodig (Slovakia) F Polášek	7^{7}	6
3	(Mexico) S González (Pakistan) A-u-H Qureshi	6^{4}	4
(Ukraine) D Molchanov (Slovakia) I Zelenay	7^{7}	6^{3}	[10]
(Argentina) A Molteni (Belgium) J Vliegen	6^{5}	7^{7}	[3]
WC	(Turkey) T Altuna (Turkey) C İlkel	5	2
2	(Brazil) M Demoliner (India) D Sharan	7	6

Quarterfinals
(Israel) J Erlich (New Zealand) A Sitak	6	5	[10]
(Sweden) R Lindstedt (Germany) T Pütz	4	7	[6]
4	(Czech Republic) R Jebavý (Austria) P Oswald	7^{13}	6
(India) L Paes (France) B Paire	6^{11}	4
(Australia) L Saville (Australia) J Thompson	1	2
(Croatia) I Dodig (Slovakia) F Polášek	6	6
(Ukraine) D Molchanov (Slovakia) I Zelenay	6	7
2	(Brazil) M Demoliner (India) D Sharan	2	5

Semifinals
(Israel) J Erlich (New Zealand) A Sitak	6	6
4	(Czech Republic) R Jebavý (Austria) P Oswald	4	4
(Croatia) I Dodig (Slovakia) F Polášek	4	7^{7}	[10]
(Ukraine) D Molchanov (Slovakia) I Zelenay	6	6^{2}	[6]

Final
(Israel) J Erlich (New Zealand) A Sitak	6	6
(Croatia) I Dodig (Slovakia) F Polášek	3	4
