= 2018 Antalya Open – Singles =

Singles
- 2018 Antalya Open

Final
- Champion: (Bosnia and Herzegovina) Damir Džumhur
- Runner-up: (France) Adrian Mannarino
- Score: 6–1, 1–6, 6–1

Details
- Draw: 28 (4 Q / 3 WC )
- Seeds: 8

Events
Singles	Doubles
← 2017 ·	Antalya Open	· 2019 →

Damir Džumhur defeated Adrian Mannarino in the final, 6–1, 1–6, 6–1, to win the singles title at the 2018 Antalya Open.

Yūichi Sugita was the defending champion, but lost in the second round to Pierre-Hugues Herbert.

== Seeds ==
The top four seeds receive a bye into the second round.

1. (France) Adrian Mannarino (final)
2. (Bosnia and Herzegovina) Damir Džumhur (champion)
3. (Spain) Fernando Verdasco (second round)
4. (France) Gaël Monfils (semifinals)
5. (Netherlands) Robin Haase (second round)
6. (Portugal) João Sousa (quarterfinals)
7. (Japan) Yūichi Sugita (second round)
8. (Serbia) Dušan Lajović (second round)

== Draw ==
=== Key ===
- Q = Qualifier
- WC = Wild card
- LL = Lucky loser
- Alt = Alternate
- SE = Special exempt
- PR = Protected ranking
- ITF = ITF entry
- JE = Junior exempt
- w/o = Walkover
- r = Retired
- d = Defaulted
- SR = Special ranking

=== Finals ===
Semifinals
1	(France) Adrian Mannarino	4	7^{7}	6
4/WC	(France) Gaël Monfils	6	6^{4}	4
(Czech Republic) Jiří Veselý	3	6^{1}
2	(Bosnia and Herzegovina) Damir Džumhur	6	7^{7}

Final
1	(France) Adrian Mannarino	1	6	1
2	(Bosnia and Herzegovina) Damir Džumhur	6	1	6

=== Top half ===
First round
(Russia) E Donskoy	2	7^{7}	3
(Lithuania) R Berankis	6	6^{4}	6
(Italy) P Lorenzi	3	3
(Bosnia and Herzegovina) M Bašić	6	6
(Germany) F Mayer	2	2
6	(Portugal) J Sousa	6	6
Q	(Slovenia) B Kavčič	7^{7}	6
(Cyprus) M Baghdatis	6^{4}	3
(Spain) G García López	6	6^{7}	6
Q	(Japan) T Daniel	4	7^{9}	4
Q	(Russia) M Youzhny	6^{4}	7^{7}	4
5	(Netherlands) R Haase	7^{7}	6^{5}	6

Second round
1	(France) A Mannarino	6	7
(Lithuania) R Berankis	4	5
(Bosnia and Herzegovina) M Bašić	7^{7}	4	4
6	(Portugal) J Sousa	6^{4}	6	6
4/WC	(France) G Monfils	6	5	7
Q	(Slovenia) B Kavčič	3	7	5
(Spain) G García López	6	6^{5}	7^{7}
5	(Netherlands) R Haase	2	7^{7}	6^{2}

Quarterfinals
1	(France) A Mannarino	7^{7}	6
6	(Portugal) J Sousa	6^{3}	4
4/WC	(France) G Monfils	7^{7}	6
(Spain) G García López	6^{3}	4

Semifinals
1	(France) A Mannarino	4	7^{7}	6
4/WC	(France) G Monfils	6	6^{4}	4

=== Bottom half ===
First round
8	(Serbia) D Lajović	6	6
Q	(Slovakia) F Horanský	3	3
(Spain) R Carballés Baena	2	3
(Georgia (country)) N Basilashvili	6	6
(Czech Republic) J Veselý	6	7^{7}
(Australia) J Thompson	4	6^{5}
7	(Japan) Y Sugita	6	3	6
(Argentina) G Pella	4	6	4
(Argentina) F Delbonis	6^{5}	4
(France) P-H Herbert	7^{7}	6
WC	(Turkey) C İlkel	4	6^{5}
(Romania) M Copil	6	7^{7}

Second round
8	(Serbia) D Lajović	4	6	5
(Georgia (country)) N Basilashvili	6	2	7
(Czech Republic) J Veselý	6	7
3/WC	(Spain) F Verdasco	3	5
7	(Japan) Y Sugita	6	4	6^{5}
(France) P-H Herbert	2	6	7^{7}
(Romania) M Copil	6	4	4
2	(Bosnia and Herzegovina) D Džumhur	4	6	6

Quarterfinals
(Georgia (country)) N Basilashvili	6^{5}	2
(Czech Republic) J Veselý	7^{7}	6
(France) P-H Herbert	4	1
2	(Bosnia and Herzegovina) D Džumhur	6	6

Semifinals
(Czech Republic) J Veselý	3	6^{1}
2	(Bosnia and Herzegovina) D Džumhur	6	7^{7}

== Qualifying ==
=== Seeds ===
1. (Japan) Taro Daniel (qualified)
2. (Moldova) Radu Albot (first round)
3. (Russia) Mikhail Youzhny (qualified)
4. (Slovenia) Blaž Kavčič (qualified)
5. (South Korea) Lee Duck-hee (first round)
6. (Japan) Yoshihito Nishioka (first round)
7. (Lithuania) Laurynas Grigelis (qualifying competition)
8. (Kazakhstan) Aleksandr Nedovyesov (qualifying competition)

=== Qualifiers ===
1. (Japan) Taro Daniel
2. (Slovakia) Filip Horanský
3. (Russia) Mikhail Youzhny
4. (Slovenia) Blaž Kavčič

=== Qualifying draw ===
==== First qualifier ====
First round
1	(Japan) Taro Daniel	6	3	6
(Turkey) Marsel İlhan	3	6	3
(Spain) Roberto Ortega Olmedo	6	4	6
6	(Japan) Yoshihito Nishioka	2	6	2

Qualifying competition
1	(Japan) Taro Daniel	6	6
(Spain) Roberto Ortega Olmedo	3	1

==== Second qualifier ====
First round
2	(Moldova) Radu Albot	2	6	6^{4}
WC	(Turkey) Ergi Kırkın	6	3	7^{7}
(Slovakia) Filip Horanský	7	6
5	(South Korea) Lee Duck-hee	5	2

Qualifying competition
WC	(Turkey) Ergi Kırkın	2	1
(Slovakia) Filip Horanský	6	6

==== Third qualifier ====
First round
3	(Russia) Mikhail Youzhny	7^{7}	6
(Canada) Frank Dancevic	6^{2}	1
(France) David Guez	2	6	5
7	(Lithuania) Laurynas Grigelis	6	3	7

Qualifying competition
3	(Russia) Mikhail Youzhny	6^{5}	6	6
7	(Lithuania) Laurynas Grigelis	7^{7}	4	2

==== Fourth qualifier ====
First round
4	(Slovenia) Blaž Kavčič	7^{7}	6
PR	(Italy) Riccardo Bellotti	6^{0}	1
WC	(Turkey) Koray Kırcı	4	2
8	(Kazakhstan) Aleksandr Nedovyesov	6	6

Qualifying competition
4	(Slovenia) Blaž Kavčič	3	6	6
8	(Kazakhstan) Aleksandr Nedovyesov	6	3	3
