= 2021 Antalya Open =

- Date: January 7–13
- Edition: 4th
- Category: ATP Tour 250 series
- Draw: 32S/16D
- Prize money: €361,800
- Surface: Hard
- Location: Antalya, Turkey

Champions

Singles
- (Australia) Alex de Minaur

Doubles
- (Croatia) Nikola Mektić / (Croatia) Mate Pavić
← 2019 ·	Antalya Open	· 2022 →

The 2021 Antalya Open was a men's tennis tournament played on outdoor hard courts. It was the 4th edition of the event and part of the ATP Tour 250 series of the 2021 ATP Tour. The tournament took place in Antalya, Turkey, from January 7 to 13.

== Points and prize money ==
=== Point distribution ===
Event	W	F	SF	QF	Round of 16	Round of 32	Q	Q2	Q1
Singles	250	150	90	45	20	0	12	6	0
Doubles	250	150	90	45	0	—	—	—	—

=== Prize money ===
Event	W	F	SF	QF	Round of 16	Round of 32	Q2	Q1
Singles	€27,960	€20,000	€14,000	€9,700	€5,700	€3,200	€1,750	€1,000
Doubles*	€8,900	€6,880	€5,050	€3,440	€2,350	—	—	—

_{*per team}

== Singles main-draw entrants ==
=== Seeds ===
Country	Player	Rank^{1}	Seed
ITA	Matteo Berrettini	10	1
BEL	David Goffin	16	2
ITA	Fabio Fognini	17	3
AUS	Alex de Minaur	23	4
GER	Jan-Lennard Struff	37	5
GEO	Nikoloz Basilashvili	40	6
SRB	Miomir Kecmanović	42	7
KAZ	Alexander Bublik	49	8

- Rankings are as of January 4, 2021.

=== Other entrants ===
The following players received wildcards into the singles main draw:

- (Turkey) Altuğ Çelikbilek
- (Turkey) Marsel İlhan
- (Turkey) Ergi Kırkın

The following players received entry from the qualifying draw:

- (Bulgaria) Adrian Andreev
- (Germany) Matthias Bachinger
- (Russia) Pavel Kotov
- (Bulgaria) Dimitar Kuzmanov
- (Slovakia) Alex Molčan
- (Czech Republic) Michael Vrbenský

=== Withdrawals ===
Before the tournament

- (Italy) Marco Cecchinato → replaced by (Poland) Kacper Żuk
- (Croatia) Borna Ćorić → replaced by (France) Tristan Lamasine
- (South Africa) Lloyd Harris → replaced by (Spain) Nicola Kuhn
- (France) Benoît Paire → replaced by (Italy) Andrea Arnaboldi
- (Italy) Jannik Sinner → replaced by (Tunisia) Malek Jaziri
- (Portugal) João Sousa → replaced by (France) Hugo Grenier

During the tournament

- (France) Hugo Grenier

== Doubles main-draw entrants ==
=== Seeds ===
Country	Player	Country	Player	Rank^{1}	Seed
CRO	Nikola Mektić	CRO	Mate Pavić	12	1
CRO	Ivan Dodig	SVK	Filip Polášek	33	2
FRA	Jérémy Chardy	FRA	Fabrice Martin	60	3
SRB	Nikola Ćaćić	DEN	Frederik Nielsen	111	4

- Rankings are as of January 4, 2021.

=== Other entrants ===
The following pairs received wildcards into the doubles main draw:

- (Turkey) Umut Akkoyun / (Turkey) Mert Naci Türker
- (Turkey) Tuna Altuna / (Turkey) Altuğ Çelikbilek

=== Withdrawals ===
Before the tournament

- (Netherlands) Sander Arends / (Netherlands) Matwé Middelkoop → replaced by (Switzerland) Luca Margaroli / (Romania) Florin Mergea
- (Italy) Matteo Berrettini / (Italy) Jannik Sinner → replaced by (Ukraine) Denys Molchanov / (Kazakhstan) Aleksandr Nedovyesov
- (Bosnia and Herzegovina) Tomislav Brkić / (Pakistan) Aisam-ul-Haq Qureshi → replaced by (Croatia) Ivan Sabanov / (Croatia) Matej Sabanov
- (South Africa) Lloyd Harris / (Netherlands) David Pel → replaced by (Czech Republic) Jiří Veselý / (Austria) Tristan-Samuel Weissborn
- (France) Benoît Paire / (Italy) Stefano Travaglia → replaced by (Finland) Harri Heliövaara / (Finland) Emil Ruusuvuori

== Champions ==
=== Singles ===
- (Australia) Alex de Minaur def. (Kazakhstan) Alexander Bublik, 2-0 ret.

=== Doubles ===
- (Croatia) Nikola Mektić / (Croatia) Mate Pavić def. (Croatia) Ivan Dodig / (Slovakia) Filip Polášek, 6–2, 6–4
