= 2011 International German Open – Singles =

Singles
- 2011 International German Open

Final
- Champion: (France) Gilles Simon
- Runner-up: (Spain) Nicolás Almagro
- Score: 6–4, 4–6, 6–4

Details
- Draw: 48
- Seeds: 16

Events
| Singles | Doubles |
- International German Open

The 2011 International German Open was the 105th edition of the International German Open, a men's tennis tournament held that year in Hamburg, Germany. Part of the ATP World Tour 500 series of the 2011 ATP World Tour, the games would last from 18 July through 24 July 2011. Andrey Golubev was the defending champion, but lost to Philipp Kohlschreiber in the first round.

Gilles Simon won in the final 6–4, 4–6, 6–4, against Nicolás Almagro.

== Seeds ==
All seeds received a bye into the second round.

1. (France) Gaël Monfils (quarterfinals)
2. (Austria) Jürgen Melzer (quarterfinals)
3. (Spain) Nicolás Almagro (final)
4. (Russia) Mikhail Youzhny (semifinals)
5. (France) Gilles Simon (champion)
6. (Germany) Florian Mayer (quarterfinals)
7. (Argentina) Juan Ignacio Chela (second round)
8. (Spain) Fernando Verdasco (semifinals)
9. (Serbia) Janko Tipsarević (second round)
10. (Ukraine) Alexandr Dolgopolov (second round)
11. (Russia) Nikolay Davydenko (second round)
12. (Croatia) Marin Čilić (quarterfinals)
13. (Italy) Andreas Seppi (second round)
14. (Spain) Guillermo García López (second round)
15. (Italy) Fabio Fognini (third round)
16. (Spain) Albert Montañés (second round, retired)

== Draw ==
Key

- Q = Qualifier
- WC = Wild card
- LL = Lucky loser
- Alt = Alternate
- ITF = ITF entry
- PR = Protected ranking
- SR = Special ranking
- SE = Special exempt
- JE = Junior exempt
- JR = Junior Accelerator Programme entrant
- CO = College Accelerator Programme entrant
- NG = Next Gen Accelerator Program entrant
- w/o = Walkover
- r = Retired
- d = Defaulted

=== Finals ===
Quarterfinals
1 | (France) Gaël Monfils | 4 | 6 | 0
5 | (France) Gilles Simon | 6 | 3 | 6
4 | (Russia) Mikhail Youzhny | 4 | 6 | 7^{8}
12 | (Croatia) Marin Čilić | 6 | 3 | 6^{6}
6 | (Germany) Florian Mayer | 6^{5} | 6^{3}
3 | (Spain) Nicolás Almagro | 7^{7} | 7^{7}
8 | (Spain) Fernando Verdasco | 6 | 2 | 6
2 | (Austria) Jürgen Melzer | 3 | 6 | 4

Semifinals
5 | (France) Gilles Simon | 3 | 6 | 6
4 | (Russia) Mikhail Youzhny | 6 | 3 | 1
3 | (Spain) Nicolás Almagro | 6 | 6
8 | (Spain) Fernando Verdasco | 4 | 1

Final
5 | (France) Gilles Simon | 6 | 4 | 6
3 | (Spain) Nicolás Almagro | 4 | 6 | 4

=== Top half ===
==== Section 1 ====
First round
(France) A Mannarino | 2 | 4
Q | (Spain) A Ramos | 6 | 6
(Czech Republic) R Štěpánek | 7 | 7^{7}
WC | (Germany) A Beck | 5 | 6^{2}
(Finland) J Nieminen | 6 | 6
(Colombia) S Giraldo | 4 | 3
(Ukraine) S Stakhovsky | 6 | 6
(Argentina) M González | 2 | 3

Second round
1 | (France) G Monfils | 6 | 6
Q | (Spain) A Ramos | 4 | 2
(Czech Republic) R Štěpánek | 6 | 7
13 | (Italy) A Seppi | 1 | 5
10 | (Ukraine) A Dolgopolov | 3 | 6 | 4
(Finland) J Nieminen | 6 | 1 | 6
(Ukraine) S Stakhovsky | 2 | 1
5 | (France) G Simon | 6 | 6

Third round
1 | (France) G Monfils | 6 | 6
(Czech Republic) R Štěpánek | 4 | 4
(Finland) J Nieminen | 6^{4} | 6 | 4
5 | (France) G Simon | 7^{7} | 3 | 6

Quarterfinals
1 | (France) G Monfils | 4 | 6 | 0
5 | (France) G Simon | 6 | 3 | 6

==== Section 2 ====
First round
(Argentina) C Berlocq | 6 | 6
(Netherlands) R Haase | 2 | 2
(Uzbekistan) D Istomin | 3 | 4
WC | (Germany) J Reister | 6 | 6
Q | (Germany) B Knittel | 6 | 6
(Croatia) I Dodig | 4 | 3
WC | (Germany) T Kamke | 6 | 6
(Spain) P Riba | 1 | 1

Second round
4 | (Russia) M Youzhny | 7 | 7^{9}
(Argentina) C Berlocq | 5 | 6^{7}
WC | (Germany) J Reister | 7^{7} | 6
14 | (Spain) G García López | 6^{5} | 2
12 | (Croatia) M Čilić | 6 | 6^{4} | 6
Q | (Germany) B Knittel | 3 | 7 | 4
WC | (Germany) T Kamke | 6 | 6
7 | (Argentina) JI Chela | 1 | 4

Third round
4 | (Russia) M Youzhny | 6 | 6
WC | (Germany) J Reister | 3 | 3
12 | (Croatia) M Čilić | 3 | 6 | 6
WC | (Germany) T Kamke | 6 | 3 | 2

Quarterfinals
4 | (Russia) M Youzhny | 4 | 6 | 7^{8}
12 | (Croatia) M Čilić | 6 | 3 | 6^{6}

=== Bottom half ===
==== Section 3 ====
First round
Q | (Turkey) M İlhan | 6 | 4 | 7^{7}
(Germany) P Petzschner | 2 | 6 | 6^{5}
Q | (Italy) S Bolelli | 3 | 5
(Argentina) J Mónaco | 6 | 7
(Kazakhstan) A Golubev | 5 | 3
(Germany) P Kohlschreiber | 7 | 6
LL | (Czech Republic) L Rosol | 7^{7} | 6
(Italy) P Starace | 6^{5} | 1

Second round
6 | (Germany) F Mayer | 6 | 7^{7}
Q | (Turkey) M İlhan | 4 | 6^{5}
(Argentina) J Mónaco | 6 | 6
9 | (Serbia) J Tipsarević | 2 | 4
16 | (Spain) A Montañés | 1 | 2^{r}
(Germany) P Kohlschreiber | 6 | 3
LL | (Czech Republic) L Rosol | 4 | 4
3 | (Spain) N Almagro | 6 | 6

Third round
6 | (Germany) F Mayer | 7 | 7
(Argentina) J Mónaco | 5 | 5
(Germany) P Kohlschreiber | 3 | 5
3 | (Spain) N Almagro | 6 | 7

Quarterfinals
6 | (Germany) F Mayer | 6^{5} | 6^{3}
3 | (Spain) N Almagro | 7^{7} | 7^{7}

==== Section 4 ====
First round
(France) J Benneteau | 2 | 2
(Spain) P Andújar | 6 | 6
(Spain) JC Ferrero | 3 | 2
WC | (Germany) C-M Stebe | 6 | 6
Q | (Romania) V Crivoi | 6 | 6
Q | (Spain) G Olaso | 4 | 3
(Spain) M Granollers | 3 | r
(Spain) D Gimeno Traver | 6

Second round
8 | (Spain) F Verdasco | 6 | 6
(Spain) P Andújar | 2 | 3
WC | (Germany) C-M Stebe | 6 | 7^{7}
11 | (Russia) N Davydenko | 3 | 6^{5}
15 | (Italy) F Fognini | 6 | 7
Q | (Romania) V Crivoi | 1 | 5
(Spain) D Gimeno Traver | 3 | 7 | 1
2 | (Austria) J Melzer | 6 | 5 | 6

Third round
8 | (Spain) F Verdasco | 7 | 6
WC | (Germany) C-M Stebe | 5 | 2
15 | (Italy) F Fognini | 2 | 3
2 | (Austria) J Melzer | 6 | 6

Quarterfinals
8 | (Spain) F Verdasco | 6 | 2 | 6
2 | (Austria) J Melzer | 3 | 6 | 4
