= 2009 International German Open – Singles =

Tennis tournament

Singles
- 2009 International German Open

Final
- Champion: (Russia) Nikolay Davydenko
- Runner-up: (France) Paul-Henri Mathieu
- Score: 6–4, 6–2

Details
- Draw: 48 (6Q / 4WC)
- Seeds: 16

Events
Singles	Doubles
- International German Open

Rafael Nadal was the defending champion, but chose not to participate that year.

Second-seeded Nikolay Davydenko won the singles title at 2009 International German Open tennis tournament, defeating Paul-Henri Mathieu in the final .

== Seeds ==
All seeds receive a bye into the second round.

1. (France) Gilles Simon (second round)
2. (Russia) Nikolay Davydenko (champion)
3. (Sweden) Robin Söderling (third round)
4. (Spain) Tommy Robredo (second round)
5. (Switzerland) Stanislas Wawrinka (second round)
6. (Spain) David Ferrer (semifinals)
7. (Russia) Igor Andreev (second round)
8. (Germany) Philipp Kohlschreiber (third round)
9. (Austria) Jürgen Melzer (second round)
10. (Serbia) Viktor Troicki (quarterfinals, retired because of a right foot injury)
11. (Romania) Victor Hănescu (quarterfinals)
12. (Argentina) José Acasuso (second round, retired because of a neck injury)
13. (France) Paul-Henri Mathieu (final)
14. (Spain) Nicolás Almagro (quarterfinals)
15. (France) Jérémy Chardy (third round)
16. (Germany) Mischa Zverev (second round)

== Draw ==
Key

- Q = Qualifier
- WC = Wild card
- LL = Lucky loser
- Alt = Alternate
- ITF = ITF entry
- PR = Protected ranking
- SR = Special ranking
- SE = Special exempt
- JE = Junior exempt
- JR = Junior Accelerator Programme entrant
- CO = College Accelerator Programme entrant
- NG = Next Gen Accelerator Program entrant
- w/o = Walkover
- r = Retired
- d = Defaulted

=== Finals ===
Quarterfinals
13	(France) Paul-Henri Mathieu	3
10	(Serbia) Victor Troicki	0^{r}
14	(Spain) Nicolás Almagro	2	4
Q	(Uruguay) Pablo Cuevas	6	6
6	(Spain) David Ferrer	6	6
WC	(Germany) Simon Greul	2	3
11	(Romania) Victor Hănescu	3	6	3
2	(Russia) Nikolay Davydenko	6	4	6

Semifinals
13	(France) Paul-Henri Mathieu	4	6	7
Q	(Uruguay) Pablo Cuevas	6	3	5
6	(Spain) David Ferrer	5	6^{2}
2	(Russia) Nikolay Davydenko	7	7

Final
13	(France) Paul-Henri Mathieu	4	2
2	(Russia) Nikolay Davydenko	6	6

=== Top half ===
==== Section 1 ====
First round
Q	(Romania) V Crivoi	6	4	1
WC	(Germany) D Brands	4	6	6
Q	(Russia) E Korolev	6^{3}	2
Q	(Spain) P Riba	7	6
(Russia) T Gabashvili	6	6
(Italy) A Seppi	3	1
(Belgium) C Rochus	4	2
(Spain) G García López	6	6

Second round
1	(France) G Simon	6	4	3
WC	(Germany) D Brands	3	6	6
Q	(Spain) P Riba	1	6	6^{3}
13	(France) P-H Mathieu	6	2	7
10	(Serbia) V Troicki	3	6	6
(Russia) T Gabashvili	6	2	4
(Spain) G García López	6	6
5	(Switzerland) S Wawrinka	2	4

Third round
WC	(Germany) D Brands	5	5
13	(France) P-H Mathieu	7	7
10	(Serbia) V Troicki	6^{2}	6	7
(Spain) G García López	7	4	6^{6}

Quarterfinals
13	(France) P-H Mathieu	3
10	(Serbia) V Troicki	0^{r}

==== Section 2 ====
First round
(Italy) F Fognini	6	6
(Czech Republic) I Minář	4	2
(Argentina) M Vassallo Argüello	4	4
Q	(Spain) M Granollers	6	6
Q	(Uruguay) P Cuevas	7	6
(Germany) B Phau	6^{0}	4
Q	(Italy) P Starace	5	6	6
(Argentina) M González	7	4	3

Second round
3	(Sweden) R Söderling	6	6^{3}	6
(Italy) F Fognini	3	7	3
Q	(Spain) M Granollers	6	3	4
14	(Spain) N Almagro	4	6	6
9	(Austria) J Melzer	6^{5}	3
Q	(Uruguay) P Cuevas	7	6
Q	(Italy) P Starace	2	6	4
8	(Germany) P Kohlschreiber	6	4	6

Third round
3	(Sweden) R Söderling	5	3
14	(Spain) N Almagro	7	6
Q	(Uruguay) P Cuevas	6	7
8	(Germany) P Kohlschreiber	4	6^{8}

Quarterfinals
14	(Spain) N Almagro	2	4
Q	(Uruguay) P Cuevas	6	6

=== Bottom half ===
==== Section 3 ====
First round
WC	(Germany) F Mayer	6^{3}	6	6
(Germany) R Schüttler	7	3	3
(Argentina) J Mónaco	7	6
(Russia) M Youzhny	6^{4}	3
(Serbia) J Tipsarević	6	3	3
WC	(Germany) S Greul	2	6	6
(Belgium) S Darcis	4	4
(Spain) I Navarro	6	6

Second round
6	(Spain) D Ferrer	6	6
WC	(Germany) F Mayer	3	2
(Argentina) J Mónaco	6	1
12	(Argentina) J Acasuso	1	1^{r}
16	(Germany) M Zverev	6	5	1
WC	(Germany) S Greul	0	7	6
(Spain) I Navarro	7	7
4	(Spain) T Robredo	5	6^{2}

Third round
6	(Spain) D Ferrer	4	7	6
(Argentina) J Mónaco	6	5	2
WC	(Germany) S Greul	7	7
(Spain) I Navarro	5	6^{7}

Quarterfinals
6	(Spain) D Ferrer	6	6
WC	(Germany) S Greul	2	3

==== Section 4 ====
First round
(France) J Benneteau	6	1	6
(Argentina) JI Chela	4	6	1
WC	(Germany) K Krawietz	0	6	3
(Czech Republic) J Hernych	6	4	6
(Spain) Ó Hernández	7	4	4
(Germany) A Beck	6^{3}	6	6
(Germany) P Petzschner	7	6
(France) F Serra	6^{3}	2

Second round
7	(Russia) I Andreev	4	3
(France) J Benneteau	6	6
(Czech Republic) J Hernych	2	3
11	(Romania) V Hănescu	6	6
15	(France) J Chardy	7	7
(Germany) A Beck	6^{2}	6^{6}
(Germany) P Petzschner	3	2
2	(Russia) N Davydenko	6	6

Third round
(France) J Benneteau	6	3	3
11	(Romania) V Hănescu	3	6	6
15	(France) J Chardy	3	3
2	(Russia) N Davydenko	6	6

Quarterfinals
11	(Romania) V Hănescu	3	6	3
2	(Russia) N Davydenko	6	4	6

== Qualifying ==
The top two seeds received a bye into the qualifying competition

=== Seeds ===
1. (Italy) Potito Starace (qualified)
2. (Romania) Victor Crivoi (qualified)
3. (Spain) Daniel Gimeno Traver (qualifying competition)
4. (Kazakhstan) Evgeny Korolev (qualified)
5. (Spain) Marcel Granollers (qualified)
6. (Argentina) Diego Junqueira (qualifying competition)
7. (Uruguay) Pablo Cuevas (qualified)
8. (France) Adrian Mannarino (first round)
9. (Spain) Pablo Andújar (first round)
10. (Spain) Pere Riba (qualified)
11. (Argentina) Guillermo Cañas (qualifying competition)
12. (Austria) Stefan Koubek (qualifying competition)

=== Qualifiers ===
1. (Italy) Potito Starace
2. (Romania) Victor Crivoi
3. (Uruguay) Pablo Cuevas
4. (Kazakhstan) Evgeny Korolev
5. (Spain) Marcel Granollers
6. (Spain) Pere Riba

=== Draw ===
==== First qualifier ====
First round				Qualifying competition
				1	(Italy) Potito Starace	6	6
	(Romania) Teodor-Dacian Crăciun	3	3	11	(Argentina) Guillermo Cañas	4	2
11	(Argentina) Guillermo Cañas	6	6

==== Second qualifier ====
First round					Qualifying competition
					2	(Romania) Victor Crivoi	6	7
	(Germany) Dominik Meffert	4	6	6		(Germany) Dominik Meffert	0	5
9	(Spain) Pablo Andújar	6	3	2

==== Third qualifier ====
First round
3	(Spain) Daniel Gimeno Traver	7^{7}	2	6
(Italy) Andrea Arnaboldi	6^{5}	6	4
(Spain) Carles Poch Gradin	4	2
7	(Uruguay) Pablo Cuevas	6	6

Qualifying competition
3	(Spain) Daniel Gimeno Traver	2	6^{3}
7	(Uruguay) Pablo Cuevas	6	7^{7}

==== Fourth qualifier ====
First round
4	(Kazakhstan) Evgeny Korolev	6	7^{8}
(Germany) Julian Reister	3	6^{6}
WC	(Germany) Philipp Hammer	3	7^{7}	1
12	(Austria) Stefan Koubek	6	6^{5}	6

Qualifying competition
4	(Kazakhstan) Evgeny Korolev	6	6
12	(Austria) Stefan Koubek	2	2

==== Fifth qualifier ====
First round
5	(Spain) Marcel Granollers	6	6
(Chile) Adrián García	4	4
WC	(Finland) Jaan-Frederik Brunken	6	6
8	(France) Adrian Mannarino	2	3

Qualifying competition
5	(Spain) Marcel Granollers	6	6
WC	(Finland) Jaan-Frederik Brunken	2	3

==== Sixth qualifier ====
First round
6	(Argentina) Diego Junqueira	2	6	7^{7}
(Germany) Jan-Lennard Struff	6	3	6^{4}
(Germany) Nils Langer	3	4
10	(Spain) Pere Riba	6	6

Qualifying competition
6	(Argentina) Diego Junqueira	3	1
10	(Spain) Pere Riba	6	6
