= 2011 International German Open =

- Date: 18–24 July
- Edition: 105th
- Category: ATP World Tour 500
- Draw: 48S / 16D
- Prize money: €1,000,000
- Surface: Clay / outdoor
- Location: Hamburg, Germany

Champions

Singles
- (France) Gilles Simon

Doubles
- (Austria) Oliver Marach / (Austria) Alexander Peya
- International German Open

The 2011 International German Open (also known as the bet–at–home Open – German Tennis Championships 2011 for sponsorship reasons) was a men's tennis tournament played on outdoor red clay courts. It was the 105th edition of the event known that year as the International German Open and was part of the ATP World Tour 500 series of the 2011 ATP World Tour. It took place at the Am Rothenbaum in Hamburg, Germany, from 18 July through 24 July 2011. Fifth-seeded Gilles Simon won the singles title.

== Finals ==
=== Singles ===
(France) Gilles Simon defeated (Spain) Nicolás Almagro, 6–4, 4–6, 6–4

- It was Simon's second title of the year and ninth of his career.

=== Doubles ===
(Austria) Oliver Marach / (Austria) Alexander Peya defeated (Czech Republic) František Čermák / (Slovakia) Filip Polášek, 6–4, 6–1

== Singles main draw entrants ==
=== Seeds ===
Nation	Player	Ranking*	Seeding
FRA	Gaël Monfils	7	1
AUT	Jürgen Melzer	12	2
ESP	Nicolás Almagro	14	3
RUS	Mikhail Youzhny	17	4
FRA	Gilles Simon	18	5
GER	Florian Mayer	20	6
ARG	Juan Ignacio Chela	21	7
ESP	Fernando Verdasco	22	8
SRB	Janko Tipsarević	23	9
UKR	Alexandr Dolgopolov	26	10
RUS	Nikolay Davydenko	29	11
CRO	Marin Čilić	32	12
ITA	Andreas Seppi	37	13
ESP	Guillermo García-López	38	14
ITA	Fabio Fognini	39	15
ESP	Albert Montañés	41	16

*Seedings based on the July 12, 2011 rankings.

=== Other entrants ===
The following players received wildcards into the singles main draw:

- (Germany) Andreas Beck
- (Germany) Tobias Kamke
- (Germany) Julian Reister
- (Germany) Cedrik-Marcel Stebe

The following players received entry from the qualifying draw:

- (Italy) Simone Bolelli
- (Romania) Victor Crivoi
- (Turkey) Marsel İlhan
- (Germany) Bastian Knittel
- (Spain) Guillermo Olaso
- (Spain) Albert Ramos

The following players received entry from a lucky loser spot:

- (Czech Republic) Lukáš Rosol
