= 2011 International German Open – Doubles =

Doubles
- 2011 International German Open

Final
- Champions: (Austria) Oliver Marach (Austria) Alexander Peya
- Runners-up: (Czech Republic) František Čermák (Slovakia) Filip Polášek
- Score: 6–4, 6–1

Details
- Draw: 16
- Seeds: 4

Events
Singles	Doubles
- International German Open

Marc López and David Marrero were the defending champions, but lost in the first round to Andreas Beck and Christopher Kas.

Third-seeded Austrian couple Oliver Marach and Alexander Peya won the title beating František Čermák and Filip Polášek in the final, 6–4, 6–1.

== Seeds ==
1. (Poland) Mariusz Fyrstenberg / (Poland) Marcin Matkowski (first round)
2. (Austria) Jürgen Melzer / (Germany) Philipp Petzschner (first round)
3. (Austria) Oliver Marach / (Austria) Alexander Peya (champions)
4. (Czech Republic) František Čermák / (Slovakia) Filip Polášek (final)

== Draw ==
Key

- Q = Qualifier
- WC = Wild card
- LL = Lucky loser
- Alt = Alternate
- ITF = ITF entry
- PR = Protected ranking
- SR = Special ranking
- SE = Special exempt
- JE = Junior exempt
- JR = Junior Accelerator Programme entrant
- CO = College Accelerator Programme entrant
- NG = Next Gen Accelerator Program entrant
- w/o = Walkover
- r = Retired
- d = Defaulted

=== Draw ===
First round
1	(Poland) M Fyrstenberg (Poland) M Matkowski	4	3
(Ukraine) S Stakhovsky (Czech Republic) R Štěpánek	6	6
(Argentina) C Berlocq (Italy) F Fognini	3	7	[8]
(Italy) D Bracciali (Belgium) D Norman	6	5	[10]
4	(Czech Republic) F Čermák (Slovakia) F Polášek	6	6
Alt	(Kazakhstan) A Golubev (Uzbekistan) D Istomin	3	4
(Argentina) JI Chela (Mexico) S González	4	6	[5]
(Croatia) M Čilić (Croatia) I Dodig	6	4	[10]
(France) G Monfils (France) G Simon	6	6
WC	(Germany) T Kamke (Germany) J Reister	4	2
(Germany) P Kohlschreiber (Germany) F Mayer	4	6^{4}
3	(Austria) O Marach (Austria) A Peya	6	7^{7}
WC	(Germany) A Beck (Germany) C Kas	6	6
(Spain) M López (Spain) D Marrero	3	4
(Czech Republic) L Dlouhý (Slovakia) M Mertiňák	2	6	[10]
2	(Austria) J Melzer (Germany) P Petzschner	6	4	[5]

Quarterfinals
(Ukraine) S Stakhovsky (Czech Republic) R Štěpánek	6	4	[10]
(Italy) D Bracciali (Belgium) D Norman	4	6	[8]
4	(Czech Republic) F Čermák (Slovakia) F Polášek	7^{8}	6
(Croatia) M Čilić (Croatia) I Dodig	6^{6}	1
(France) G Monfils (France) G Simon	3	7^{7}	[5]
3	(Austria) O Marach (Austria) A Peya	6	6^{3}	[10]
WC	(Germany) A Beck (Germany) C Kas	5	6	[13]
(Czech Republic) L Dlouhý (Slovakia) M Mertiňák	7	3	[11]

Semifinals
(Ukraine) S Stakhovsky (Czech Republic) R Štěpánek	5	3
4	(Czech Republic) F Čermák (Slovakia) F Polášek	7	6
3	(Austria) O Marach (Austria) A Peya	7^{7}	6
WC	(Germany) A Beck (Germany) C Kas	6^{3}	4

Final
4	(Czech Republic) F Čermák (Slovakia) F Polášek	4	1
3	(Austria) O Marach (Austria) A Peya	6	6
