= 2017 Antalya Open – Singles =

Singles
- 2017 Antalya Open

Final
- Champion: (Japan) Yūichi Sugita
- Runner-up: (France) Adrian Mannarino
- Score: 6–1, 7–6^{(7–4)}

Details
- Draw: 28 (4 Q / 3 WC )
- Seeds: 8

Events
Singles	Doubles
Antalya Open	· 2018 →

This was the first edition of the tournament.

Yūichi Sugita won his first ATP World Tour title, defeating Adrian Mannarino in the final, 6–1, 7–6^{(7–4)}.

== Seeds ==
The top four seeds receive a bye into the second round.

1. (Austria) Dominic Thiem (second round)
2. (Italy) Paolo Lorenzi (second round)
3. (Spain) Fernando Verdasco (quarterfinals)
4. (Spain) David Ferrer (second round)
5. (Russia) Karen Khachanov (withdrew due to shoulder injury)
6. (Serbia) Viktor Troicki (first round)
7. (Croatia) Borna Ćorić (first round)
8. (Slovakia) Martin Kližan (first round, retired)

== Draw ==
=== Key ===
- Q = Qualifier
- WC = Wild card
- LL = Lucky loser
- Alt = Alternate
- SE = Special exempt
- PR = Protected ranking
- ITF = ITF entry
- JE = Junior exempt
- w/o = Walkover
- r = Retired
- d = Defaulted
- SR = Special ranking

=== Finals ===
Semifinals
(Cyprus) Marcos Baghdatis	3	7^{9}	1^{r}
(Japan) Yūichi Sugita	6	6^{7}	4
(France) Adrian Mannarino	6	6
(Italy) Andreas Seppi	4	4

Final
(Japan) Yūichi Sugita	6	7^{7}
(France) Adrian Mannarino	1	6^{4}

=== Top half ===
First round
(Brazil) R Dutra Silva	3	4
Q	(India) R Ramanathan	6	6
(Georgia (country)) N Basilashvili	2	1
(Cyprus) M Baghdatis	6	6
(Argentina) C Berlocq	3	6	6
6	(Serbia) V Troicki	6	2	4
(Japan) Y Sugita	6	6
Q	(Australia) M Ebden	1	3
LL	(Germany) D Altmaier	7	6^{8}	7^{7}
(Dominican Republic) V Estrella Burgos	5	7^{10}	6^{5}
WC	(Turkey) M İlhan	6
8	(Slovakia) M Kližan	6^{r}

Second round
1	(Austria) D Thiem	3	2
Q	(India) R Ramanathan	6	6
(Cyprus) M Baghdatis	6	3	7
(Argentina) C Berlocq	4	6	5
4/WC	(Spain) D Ferrer	3	6	6^{2}
(Japan) Y Sugita	6	3	7^{7}
LL	(Germany) D Altmaier	6	3	7^{7}
WC	(Turkey) M İlhan	3	6	6^{5}

Quarterfinals
Q	(India) R Ramanathan	7^{7}	3	6^{6}
(Cyprus) M Baghdatis	6^{0}	6	7^{8}
(Japan) Y Sugita	6	6
LL	(Germany) D Altmaier	3	0

Semifinals
(Cyprus) M Baghdatis	3	7^{9}	1^{r}
(Japan) Y Sugita	6	6^{7}	4

=== Bottom half ===
First round
7	(Croatia) B Ćorić	5	4
(France) A Mannarino	7	6
Q	(Egypt) M Safwat	4	6	7^{9}
WC	(Turkey) C İlkel	6	3	6^{7}
(Uzbekistan) D Istomin	4	7^{7}	4
(Belgium) S Darcis	6	6^{5}	6
LL	(South Africa) L Harris	5	3
(Serbia) J Tipsarević	7	6
(Italy) A Seppi	6	7^{7}
Q	(Poland) K Majchrzak	2	6^{1}
(Portugal) J Sousa	6^{2}	2
(Moldova) R Albot	7^{7}	6

Second round
(France) A Mannarino	6	6
Q	(Egypt) M Safwat	4	4
(Belgium) S Darcis	3	4
3	(Spain) F Verdasco	6	6
(Serbia) J Tipsarević	6	4	4
(Italy) A Seppi	3	6	6
(Moldova) R Albot	6	6
2	(Italy) P Lorenzi	3	4

Quarterfinals
(France) A Mannarino	2	7	6
3	(Spain) F Verdasco	6	5	2
(Italy) A Seppi	6	7^{7}
(Moldova) R Albot	4	6^{3}

Semifinals
(France) A Mannarino	6	6
(Italy) A Seppi	4	4

== Qualifying ==
=== Seeds ===
1. (India) Ramkumar Ramanathan (qualified)
2. (Germany) Daniel Altmaier (qualifying competition, lucky loser)
3. (South Africa) Lloyd Harris (qualifying competition, lucky loser)
4. (Russia) Alexey Vatutin (qualifying competition)
5. (Spain) Jaume Munar (first round)
6. (Serbia) Danilo Petrović (first round)
7. (Belgium) Yannick Mertens (qualifying competition)
8. (Australia) Matthew Ebden (qualified)

=== Qualifiers ===
1. (India) Ramkumar Ramanathan
2. (Australia) Matthew Ebden
3. (Poland) Kamil Majchrzak
4. (Egypt) Mohamed Safwat

=== Lucky losers ===
1. (Germany) Daniel Altmaier
2. (South Africa) Lloyd Harris

=== Qualifying draw ===
==== First qualifier ====
First round
1	(India) Ramkumar Ramanathan	6	6
(Russia) Andrey Yakovlev	0	0
(Turkey) Altuğ Çelikbilek	2	4
7	(Belgium) Yannick Mertens	6	6

Qualifying competition
1	(India) Ramkumar Ramanathan	6	6
7	(Belgium) Yannick Mertens	3	4

==== Second qualifier ====
First round
2	(Germany) Daniel Altmaier	6	6
WC	(Turkey) Anıl Yüksel	3	4
WC	(Turkey) Sarp Ağabigün	1	3
8	(Australia) Matthew Ebden	6	6

Qualifying competition
2	(Germany) Daniel Altmaier	4	7	4
8	(Australia) Matthew Ebden	6	5	6

==== Third qualifier ====
First round
3	(South Africa) Lloyd Harris	7^{7}	7^{7}
(Russia) Alexander Kudryavtsev	6^{5}	6^{5}
(Poland) Kamil Majchrzak	6	6
5	(Spain) Jaume Munar	4	2

Qualifying competition
3	(South Africa) Lloyd Harris	6^{5}	1
(Poland) Kamil Majchrzak	7^{7}	6

==== Fourth qualifier ====
First round
4	(Russia) Alexey Vatutin	6	6
Alt	(Czech Republic) Roman Jebavý	4	3
(Egypt) Mohamed Safwat	7^{7}	3	6
6	(Serbia) Danilo Petrović	6^{4}	6	3

Qualifying competition
4	(Russia) Alexey Vatutin	4	4
(Egypt) Mohamed Safwat	6	6
