= 2009 International German Open – Doubles =

Doubles
- 2009 International German Open

Final
- Champions: (Sweden) Simon Aspelin (Australia) Paul Hanley
- Runners-up: (Brazil) Marcelo Melo (Slovakia) Filip Polášek
- Score: 6–3, 6–3

Details
- Draw: 16 (2WC)
- Seeds: 4

Events
Singles	Doubles
- International German Open

Daniel Nestor and Nenad Zimonjić were the defending champions, but chose not to participate that year.

Simon Aspelin and Paul Hanley won in the final, 6–3, 6–3, against Marcelo Melo and Filip Polášek.

== Seeds ==
1. (Poland) Mariusz Fyrstenberg / (Poland) Marcin Matkowski (first round)
2. (South Africa) Wesley Moodie / (Belgium) Dick Norman (quarterfinals)
3. (Poland) Łukasz Kubot / (Austria) Oliver Marach (quarterfinals)
4. (Czech Republic) Lukáš Dlouhý / (Czech Republic) David Škoch (semifinals)

== Draw ==
Key

- Q = Qualifier
- WC = Wild card
- LL = Lucky loser
- Alt = Alternate
- ITF = ITF entry
- PR = Protected ranking
- SR = Special ranking
- SE = Special exempt
- JE = Junior exempt
- JR = Junior Accelerator Programme entrant
- CO = College Accelerator Programme entrant
- NG = Next Gen Accelerator Program entrant
- w/o = Walkover
- r = Retired
- d = Defaulted

=== Draw ===
First round
1	(Poland) M Fyrstenberg (Poland) M Matkowski	3	2
(Germany) C Kas (Serbia) V Troicki	6	6
(Sweden) S Aspelin (Australia) P Hanley	6	6
WC	(Germany) M Stich (Germany) M Zverev	4	2
3	(Poland) Ł Kubot (Austria) O Marach	6	7
(Belgium) C Rochus (Switzerland) S Wawrinka	4	6^{1}
(France) F Serra (France) G Simon	1	1
(Czech Republic) F Čermák (Slovakia) M Mertiňák	6	6
(Spain) M Granollers (Spain) T Robredo	4	2
(Austria) J Knowle (Austria) J Melzer	6	6
(Sweden) J Brunstrom (Netherlands Antilles) J-J Rojer	6^{5}	6^{5}
4	(Czech Republic) L Dlouhý (Czech Republic) D Škoch	7	7
(Brazil) M Melo (Slovakia) F Polášek	6	6
WC	(Germany) K Krawietz (Germany) N Langer	0	4
(France) J Chardy (France) P-H Mathieu	6	3	[7]
2	(South Africa) W Moodie (Belgium) D Norman	3	6	[10]

Quarterfinals
(Germany) C Kas (Serbia) V Troicki
(Sweden) S Aspelin (Australia) P Hanley	w/o
3	(Poland) Ł Kubot (Austria) O Marach	1	6	[7]
(Czech Republic) F Čermák (Slovakia) M Mertiňák	6	1	[10]
(Austria) J Knowle (Austria) J Melzer	3	6^{4}
4	(Czech Republic) L Dlouhý (Czech Republic) D Škoch	6	7
(Brazil) M Melo (Slovakia) F Polášek	6	4	[12]
2	(South Africa) W Moodie (Belgium) D Norman	4	6	[10]

Semifinals
(Sweden) S Aspelin (Australia) P Hanley	4	7	[10]
(Czech Republic) F Čermák (Slovakia) M Mertiňák	6	6^{4}	[6]
4	(Czech Republic) L Dlouhý (Czech Republic) D Škoch	2	1
(Brazil) M Melo (Slovakia) F Polášek	6	6

Final
(Sweden) S Aspelin (Australia) P Hanley	6	6
(Brazil) M Melo (Slovakia) F Polášek	3	3
