= 2018 Antalya Open – Doubles =

Doubles
- 2018 Antalya Open

Final
- Champions: (Brazil) Marcelo Demoliner (Mexico) Santiago González
- Runners-up: (Netherlands) Sander Arends (Netherlands) Matwé Middelkoop
- Score: 7–5, 6–7^{(6–8)}, [10–8]

Events
Singles	Doubles
- Antalya Open

Robert Lindstedt and Aisam-ul-Haq Qureshi were the defending champions, but Lindstedt chose to compete in Eastbourne instead. Qureshi played alongside Jean-Julien Rojer, but lost in the first round to Roman Jebavý and Julio Peralta.

Marcelo Demoliner and Santiago González won the title, defeating Sander Arends and Matwé Middelkoop in the final, 7–5, 6–7^{(6–8)}, [10–8].

== Seeds ==
1. (Pakistan) Aisam-ul-Haq Qureshi / (Netherlands) Jean-Julien Rojer (first round)
2. (Belarus) Max Mirnyi / (Austria) Philipp Oswald (semifinals)
3. (Netherlands) Sander Arends / (Netherlands) Matwé Middelkoop (final)
4. (Argentina) Andrés Molteni / (Chile) Hans Podlipnik-Castillo (quarterfinals)

== Draw ==
Key

- Q = Qualifier
- WC = Wild card
- LL = Lucky loser
- Alt = Alternate
- ITF = ITF entry
- PR = Protected ranking
- SR = Special ranking
- SE = Special exempt
- JE = Junior exempt
- JR = Junior Accelerator Programme entrant
- CO = College Accelerator Programme entrant
- NG = Next Gen Accelerator Program entrant
- w/o = Walkover
- r = Retired
- d = Defaulted

=== Draw ===
First round
1	(Pakistan) A-u-H Qureshi (Netherlands) J-J Rojer	7	6^{6}	[12]
(Czech Republic) R Jebavý (Chile) J Peralta	5	7^{8}	[14]
WC	(Turkey) K Kırcı (Turkey) E Kırkın	3	4
(Spain) G García López (Portugal) J Sousa	6	6
4	(Argentina) A Molteni (Chile) H Podlipnik-Castillo	6	6
WC	(Turkey) T Altuna (Russia) K Kravchuk	4	2
(Brazil) M Demoliner (Mexico) S González	6	6
(France) F Martin (India) P Raja	3	2
(Croatia) A Šančić (Belarus) A Vasilevski	6^{5}	6	[8]
(Moldova) R Albot (Argentina) G Pella	7^{7}	2	[10]
(Bosnia and Herzegovina) M Bašić (Serbia) D Lajović	7^{7}	6^{6}	[8]
3	(Netherlands) S Arends (Netherlands) M Middelkoop	6^{4}	7^{8}	[10]
PR	(Serbia) I Bozoljac (Bosnia and Herzegovina) D Džumhur	3	3
(France) J Eysseric (France) H Nys	6	6
(Argentina) F Delbonis (Mexico) MÁ Reyes-Varela	6^{2}	5
2	(Belarus) M Mirnyi (Austria) P Oswald	7^{7}	7

Quarterfinals
(Czech Republic) R Jebavý (Chile) J Peralta	7^{7}	3	[10]
(Spain) G García López (Portugal) J Sousa	6^{5}	6	[6]
4	(Argentina) A Molteni (Chile) H Podlipnik-Castillo	1	6^{3}
(Brazil) M Demoliner (Mexico) S González	6	7^{7}
(Moldova) R Albot (Argentina) G Pella	4	6	[7]
3	(Netherlands) S Arends (Netherlands) M Middelkoop	6	3	[10]
(France) J Eysseric (France) H Nys	6	6^{5}	[5]
2	(Belarus) M Mirnyi (Austria) P Oswald	3	7^{7}	[10]

Semifinals
(Czech Republic) R Jebavý (Chile) J Peralta	7^{7}	6^{4}	[6]
(Brazil) M Demoliner (Mexico) S González	6^{2}	7^{7}	[10]
3	(Netherlands) S Arends (Netherlands) M Middelkoop	7^{7}	6
2	(Belarus) M Mirnyi (Austria) P Oswald	6^{4}	3

Final
(Brazil) M Demoliner (Mexico) S González	7	6^{6}	[10]
3	(Netherlands) S Arends (Netherlands) M Middelkoop	5	7^{8}	[8]
