= 2019 Antalya Open – Singles =

Singles
- 2019 Antalya Open

Final
- Champion: (Italy) Lorenzo Sonego
- Runner-up: (Serbia) Miomir Kecmanović
- Score: 6–7^{(5–7)}, 7–6^{(7–5)}, 6–1

Details
- Draw: 28 (4 Q / 3 WC )
- Seeds: 8

Events
Singles	Doubles
- Antalya Open

Lorenzo Sonego defeated Miomir Kecmanović in the final, 6–7^{(5–7)}, 7–6^{(7–5)}, 6–1, to win the singles title at the 2019 Antalya Open. He saved a championship point en route to his first ATP Tour title.

Damir Džumhur was the defending champion, but retired from his quarterfinal match against Jordan Thompson.

== Seeds ==
The top four seeds receive a bye into the second round.

1. (France) Benoît Paire (second round)
2. (France) Adrian Mannarino (quarterfinals)
3. (Australia) Jordan Thompson (semifinals)
4. (Spain) Pablo Carreño Busta (semifinals)
5. (Bosnia and Herzegovina) Damir Džumhur (quarterfinals, retired)
6. (France) Ugo Humbert (second round)
7. (Italy) Andreas Seppi (first round)
8. (Portugal) João Sousa (first round)

== Draw ==
Key

- Q = Qualifier
- WC = Wild card
- LL = Lucky loser
- Alt = Alternate
- ITF = ITF entry
- PR = Protected ranking
- SR = Special ranking
- SE = Special exempt
- JE = Junior exempt
- JR = Junior Accelerator Programme entrant
- CO = College Accelerator Programme entrant
- NG = Next Gen Accelerator Program entrant
- w/o = Walkover
- r = Retired
- d = Defaulted

=== Finals ===
Semifinals
(Serbia) Miomir Kecmanović	6^{5}	7^{7}	7^{7}
3	(Australia) Jordan Thompson	7^{7}	6^{5}	6^{1}
4	(Spain) Pablo Carreño Busta	3	6^{2}
(Italy) Lorenzo Sonego	6	7^{7}

Final
(Serbia) Miomir Kecmanović	7^{7}	6^{5}	1
(Italy) Lorenzo Sonego	6^{5}	7^{7}	6

=== Top half ===
First round
Q	(Serbia) V Troicki	7^{7}	6
PR	(Slovakia) J Kovalík	6^{3}	4
(Serbia) M Kecmanović	6	6
(Spain) J Munar	4	3
(Argentina) F Delbonis	3	5
6	(France) U Humbert	6	7
(United States) B Klahn	6	6
Q	(Belgium) S Darcis	3	2
(Latvia) E Gulbis	3	6	4
WC	(Turkey) A Çelikbilek	6	4	6
(Australia) M Ebden	4	5
5	(Bosnia and Herzegovina) D Džumhur	6	7

Second round
1	(France) B Paire	6^{4}	6^{5}
Q	(Serbia) V Troicki	7^{7}	7^{7}
(Serbia) M Kecmanović	6	7
6	(France) U Humbert	4	5
3	(Australia) J Thompson	7^{9}	6
(United States) B Klahn	6^{7}	3
WC	(Turkey) A Çelikbilek	3	6	3
5	(Bosnia and Herzegovina) D Džumhur	6	4	6

Quarterfinals
Q	(Serbia) V Troicki	3	4
(Serbia) M Kecmanović	6	6
3	(Australia) J Thompson	7	1
5	(Bosnia and Herzegovina) D Džumhur	5	0^{r}

Semifinals
(Serbia) M Kecmanović	6^{5}	7^{7}	7^{7}
3	(Australia) J Thompson	7^{7}	6^{5}	6^{1}

=== Bottom half ===
First round
7	(Italy) A Seppi	6	4	4
(Australia) B Tomic	4	6	6
WC	(Turkey) E Kırkın	3	7^{7}	2
(Germany) P Gojowczyk	6	6^{3}	6
Q	(Germany) K Krawietz	6	6
WC	(Turkey) C İlkel	4	4
8	(Portugal) J Sousa	3	6^{11}
(Italy) L Sonego	6	7^{13}
(India) P Gunneswaran	6	7^{8}
PR	(Serbia) J Tipsarević	0	6^{6}
Q	(United States) JC Aragone	4	6^{2}
(Spain) R Carballés Baena	6	7^{7}

Second round
(Australia) B Tomic	7^{7}	6
(Germany) P Gojowczyk	6^{3}	3
Q	(Germany) K Krawietz	6^{6}	4
4	(Spain) P Carreño Busta	7^{8}	6
(Italy) L Sonego	6^{3}	6	7
(India) P Gunneswaran	7^{7}	0	5
(Spain) R Carballés Baena	6	1	5
2	(France) A Mannarino	3	6	7

Quarterfinals
(Australia) B Tomic	7^{9}	4	4
4	(Spain) P Carreño Busta	6^{7}	6	6
(Italy) L Sonego	3	7^{7}	6
2	(France) A Mannarino	6	6^{3}	3

Semifinals
4	(Spain) P Carreño Busta	3	6^{2}
(Italy) L Sonego	6	7^{7}

== Qualifying ==
=== Seeds ===
1. (Serbia) Viktor Troicki (qualified)
2. (Belgium) Steve Darcis (qualified)
3. (Portugal) Gonçalo Oliveira (qualifying competition)
4. (United States) JC Aragone (qualified)
5. (Switzerland) Marc-Andrea Hüsler (qualifying competition)
6. (Germany) Kevin Krawietz (qualified)
7. (Chile) Marcelo Tomás Barrios Vera (first round)
8. (India) Sasikumar Mukund (first round)

=== Qualifiers ===
1. (Serbia) Viktor Troicki
2. (Belgium) Steve Darcis
3. (Germany) Kevin Krawietz
4. (United States) JC Aragone

=== Qualifying draw ===
==== First qualifier ====
First round
1	(Serbia) Viktor Troicki	6	7
WC	(Turkey) Yankı Erel	1	5
(Spain) Roberto Ortega Olmedo	6	6
8	(India) Sasikumar Mukund	2	1

Qualifying competition
1	(Serbia) Viktor Troicki	3	7^{7}	6
(Spain) Roberto Ortega Olmedo	6	6^{4}	2

==== Second qualifier ====
First round
2	(Belgium) Steve Darcis	6	6
WC	(Turkey) Sarp Ağabigün	2	2
PR	(Spain) Carlos Gómez-Herrera	6	7^{7}
7	(Chile) Marcelo Tomás Barrios Vera	1	6^{0}

Qualifying competition
2	(Belgium) Steve Darcis	6	6
PR	(Spain) Carlos Gómez-Herrera	3	3

==== Third qualifier ====
First round
3	(Portugal) Gonçalo Oliveira	6	6
(Australia) Luke Saville	3	4
(Bosnia and Herzegovina) Aldin Šetkić	5	3
6	(Germany) Kevin Krawietz	7	6

Qualifying competition
3	(Portugal) Gonçalo Oliveira	4	6	6^{5}
6	(Germany) Kevin Krawietz	6	3	7^{7}

==== Fourth qualifier ====
First round
4	(United States) JC Aragone	6	6
Alt	(Germany) Tim Pütz	1	4
(Croatia) Ante Pavić	6^{4}	7^{7}	6^{8}
5	(Switzerland) Marc-Andrea Hüsler	7^{7}	6^{4}	7^{10}

Qualifying competition
4	(United States) JC Aragone	6	6
5	(Switzerland) Marc-Andrea Hüsler	1	4
