= Umut Akkoyun =

Turkish tennis player (born 2000)

- Country (sports): Turkey
- Born: 10 July 2000 (age 25)
- Plays: Right-handed (two-handed backhand)
- Prize money: $7,056

Singles
- Career record: 0–0 (at ATP Tour level, Grand Slam level, and in Davis Cup)
- Career titles: 0
- Highest ranking: No. 2005 (4 January 2021)
- Current ranking: No. 2005 (4 January 2021)

Doubles
- Career record: 0–0 (at ATP Tour level, Grand Slam level, and in Davis Cup)
- Career titles: 1 ITF
- Highest ranking: No. 675 (4 January 2021)
- Current ranking: No. 675 (4 January 2021)
- Last updated on: 8 January 2021.

Umut Akkoyun (born 10 July 2000) is a Turkish tennis player.

Akkoyun has a career high ATP singles ranking of 2005 achieved on 4 January 2021. He also has a career high ATP doubles ranking of 675 achieved on 4 January 2021. Akkoyun has won 1 ITF doubles title on the ITF Men's World Tennis Tour.

Akkoyun made his main drew debut at the 2021 Antalya Open in the doubles draw, receiving a wildcard alongside Mert Naci Türker.
