= Mert Naci Türker =

Turkish tennis player (born 1998)

- Country (sports): Turkey
- Born: 16 August 1998 (age 28) Tarsus, Turkey
- Height: 1.88 m (6 ft 2 in)
- Plays: Right-handed (two-handed backhand)
- Prize money: US $67,502

Singles
- Career record: 1–0 (at ATP Tour level, Grand Slam level, and in Davis Cup)
- Career titles: 0
- Highest ranking: No. 764 (24 August 2026)
- Current ranking: No. 817 (19 October 2026)

Doubles
- Career record: 0–1 (at ATP Tour level, Grand Slam level, and in Davis Cup)
- Career titles: 1 ITF
- Highest ranking: No. 412 (19 October 2026)
- Current ranking: No. 412 (19 October 2026)
- Last updated on: 19 October 2026.

Mert Naci Türker (born 16 August 1998) is a Turkish tennis player. Türker has a career high ATP singles ranking of No. 764 achieved on 24 August 2026 and a career high ATP doubles ranking of No. 412 achieved on 19 October 2026. Türker has won 1 ITF doubles title on the ITF Men's World Tennis Tour.

Türker made his main drew debut at the 2021 Antalya Open in the doubles draw, receiving a wildcard alongside Umut Akkoyun.
