= Antalya Open =

Defunct tennis tournament
- Tour: ATP Tour
- Founded: 2017; 8 years ago
- Abolished: 2021
- Editions: 4th (2021)
- Location: Belek, Antalya Province; Turkey
- Venue: Kaya Palazzo Belek
- Category: ATP Tour 250
- Surface: Grass – outdoors (2017–2019); Hard – outdoors (2021)
- Draw: 32S / 24Q / 16D
- Prize money: €361,800 (2021)
- Website: antalyaopen.com

Current champions (2021)
- Singles: (Australia) Alex de Minaur
- Doubles: (Croatia) Nikola Mektić (Croatia) Mate Pavić

The Antalya Open was an ATP Tour 250 series tennis tournament on the ATP Tour played between 2017 and 2021 in Antalya, Turkey. The tournament was played on grass courts until 2019. In 2021 it was played on hardcourts.

== Results ==
=== Singles ===
Year	Champion	Runner-up	Score
2017	(Japan) Yūichi Sugita	(France) Adrian Mannarino	6–1, 7–6^{(7–4)}
2018	(Bosnia and Herzegovina) Damir Džumhur	(France) Adrian Mannarino	6–1, 1–6, 6–1
2019	(Italy) Lorenzo Sonego	(Serbia) Miomir Kecmanović	6–7^{(5–7)}, 7–6^{(7–5)}, 6–1
2020	Not held		
2021	(Australia) Alex de Minaur	(Kazakhstan) Alexander Bublik	2–0 ret.

=== Doubles ===
Year	Champions	Runners-up	Score
2017	(Sweden) Robert Lindstedt (Pakistan) Aisam-ul-Haq Qureshi	(Austria) Oliver Marach (Croatia) Mate Pavić	7–5, 4–1 ret.
2018	(Brazil) Marcelo Demoliner (Mexico) Santiago González	(Netherlands) Sander Arends (Netherlands) Matwé Middelkoop	7–5, 6-7^{(6-8)}, [10-8]
2019	(Israel) Jonathan Erlich (New Zealand) Artem Sitak	(Croatia) Ivan Dodig (Slovakia) Filip Polášek	6–3, 6–4
2020	Not held		
2021	(Croatia) Nikola Mektić (Croatia) Mate Pavić	(Croatia) Ivan Dodig (Slovakia) Filip Polášek	6–2, 6–4
