= Filip Polášek =

Slovak tennis player (born 1985)

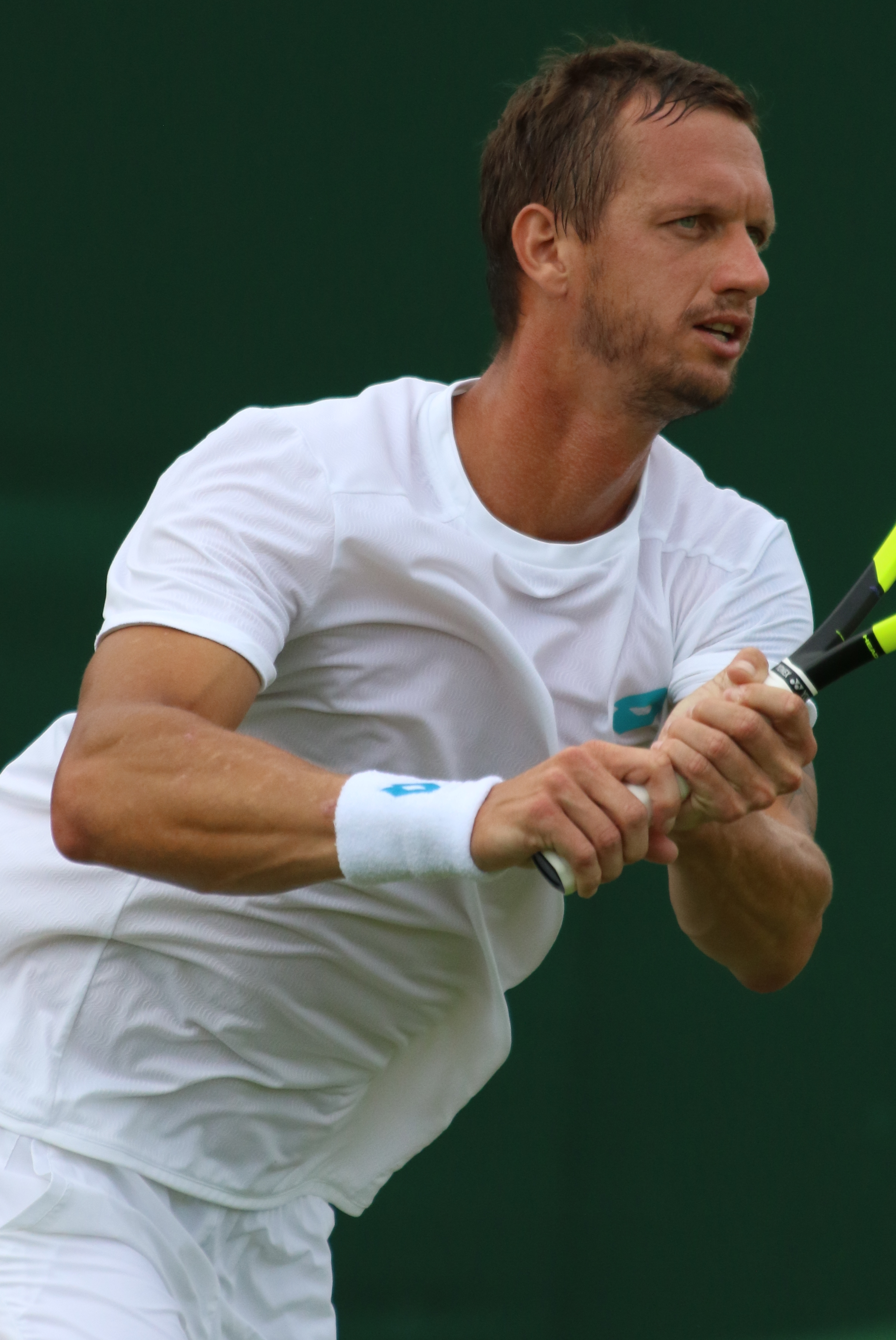
- Polasek at the 2019 Wimbledon Championships
- Country (sports): Slovakia
- Residence: Bratislava, Slovak Republic
- Born: 21 July 1985 (age 41) Zvolen, Czechoslovakia (now Slovak Republic)
- Height: 1.93 m (6 ft 4 in)
- Turned pro: 2005
- Retired: June 2025 (last match 2022)
- Plays: Right-handed (two-handed backhand)
- Coach: Leoš Friedl
- Prize money: $2,638,647

Singles
- Career record: 1–0
- Career titles: 0
- Highest ranking: No. 555 (26 November 2007)

Doubles
- Career record: 283–191
- Career titles: 17
- Highest ranking: No. 7 (3 February 2020)

Grand Slam doubles results
- Australian Open: W (2021)
- French Open: 3R (2011, 2020)
- Wimbledon: SF (2019)
- US Open: SF (2021)

Other doubles tournaments
- Tour Finals: RR (2019, 2021)
- Olympic Games: 2R (2021)

Mixed doubles
- Career record: 10–17

Grand Slam mixed doubles results
- Australian Open: QF (2010)
- French Open: QF (2013, 2021)
- Wimbledon: 2R (2013, 2022)
- US Open: 2R (2013, 2021)
- Last updated on: 8 April 2026.

Filip Polášek (Slovak pronunciation: [ˈfilip ˈpɔlaːʂek]; born 21 July 1985) is a former Slovak professional tennis player who specialises in doubles. He reached his highest doubles ranking of world No. 7 in February 2020, and has won 17 titles on the ATP Tour. He was forced to retire in 2013 due to health issues, but returned in 2018 and began the most successful phase of his career. Polášek won his first Grand Slam title at the 2021 Australian Open alongside Ivan Dodig, and also won the 2019 Cincinnati Masters and 2021 Indian Wells Masters, with Dodig and John Peers respectively. Polášek was the first Slovak man to reach, or win a major doubles final. He also reached the semifinals at the 2019 Wimbledon Championships, 2020 Australian Open and 2021 US Open. He qualified for the ATP Finals in both 2019 and 2021. Polášek has represented Slovakia in the Davis Cup since 2008, and also competed at the 2020 Summer Olympics partnering Lukáš Klein.

== Career ==
=== 2008: First ATP titles ===
Polášek reached his first ATP final at the 2008 Valencia Open with partner Travis Parrott, they fell to Máximo González and Juan Mónaco in two tight sets 5–7, 5–7. Later that year at the Swiss Open Gsaad he won his first title with partner Jaroslav Levinský in three sets. In October Polášek won his second title of the year at the St. Petersburg Open with Travis Parrott.

=== 2013: Retirement due to injury ===
In 2013 Polášek reached three ATP finals with partner Julian Knowle, winning the later two the Zagreb Indoors and the Grand Prix Hassan II.

In November 2013 Polášek retired from professional tennis at the age of 28 due to nerve issues and loose discs in his back.

=== 2018: Return to tennis ===
Several years after retirement and allowing his body to heal through less strenuous activities such as coaching tennis and ski touring, Polášek hit with Mike Bryan and started playing some club matches again, and the pain of his previous injuries didn't seem to be reoccurring. He asked to take some time off from the coaching academy he taught at and started playing some futures and then challengers. By the end of September 2019 Polášek's doubles ranking had risen to within the top 200 for the first time in five years.

=== 2019: First Masters 1000 title and Grand Slam semifinal ===
Polášek claimed his first ATP title in 6 years in Kizbühel, partnering with Philipp Oswald. At Wimbledon he reached his first Grand Slam semifinal partnering with Ivan Dodig in just their second tournament together. They then went on to capture their first Masters 1000 title as a team, and Polášek's first career masters title at the Western & Southern Open in Cincinnati defeating Juan Sebastian Cabal and Robert Farah in the final 4–6, 6–4, 10–6.

Polášek and Dodig then went on to take their second title as a team defeating defending champions Lukasz Kubot and Marcelo Melo to take the China Open title in Beijing.

=== 2020: Second Grand Slam semifinal, world No. 7 in doubles ===
Dodig and Polášek began their 2020 season at the Adelaide International, where they reached the final, losing to Maximo Gonzalez and Fabrice Martin.

They then reached the semifinals of the 2020 Australian Open before being defeated by Max Purcell and Luke Saville. As a result, he reached a new career-high doubles ranking of World No. 7 on 3 February 2020.

After this the ATP Tour was suspended due to the COVID-19 pandemic. On the tour's resumption in August at the Cincinnati Masters in New York and at the US Open they fell in the first round.

=== 2021: Historic and first Grand Slam title at the Australian Open ===
Polášek and his partner Dodig reached the final of their first tournament in 2021 at the Antalya Open, where they lost to Nikola Mektic and Mate Pavic. After two weeks quarantine in Australia, they reached the semifinals of the Great Ocean Road Open, where they lost out to Jamie Murray and Bruno Soares. Continuing to partner with Dodig, Polášek won his first Grand Slam tournament at the Australian Open defeating Rajeev Ram and Joe Salisbury in the final. With the title he became the first Slovak male Grand Slam champion. As a result, he returned to the top 10 on 22 February 2021.

== Significant finals ==
=== Grand Slam tournament finals ===
==== Doubles: 1 (1 title) ====
Result	Year	Championship	Surface	Partner	Opponents	Score
Win	2021	Australian Open	Hard	(Croatia) Ivan Dodig	(United States) Rajeev Ram (United Kingdom) Joe Salisbury	6–3, 6–4

=== Masters 1000 finals ===
==== Doubles: 2 (2 titles) ====
Result	Year	Tournament	Surface	Partner	Opponents	Score
Win	2019	Cincinnati Masters	Hard	(Croatia) Ivan Dodig	(Colombia) Juan Sebastián Cabal (Colombia) Robert Farah	4–6, 6–4, [10–6]
Win	2021	Indian Wells Masters	Hard	(Australia) John Peers	(Russia) Aslan Karatsev (Russia) Andrey Rublev	6–3, 7–6^{(7–5)}

== ATP career finals ==
=== Doubles: 35 (17 titles, 18 runners-up) ===
Legend Grand Slam tournaments (1–0) Tennis Masters Cup / ATP World Tour Finals (0–0) ATP Masters Series / ATP World Tour Masters 1000 (2–0) ATP International Series Gold / ATP World Tour 500 Series (1–4) ATP International Series / ATP World Tour 250 Series (13–14)	Titles by surface Hard (8–9) Clay (8–6) Grass (0–3)	Titles by setting Outdoor (13–15) Indoor (3–3)

Result	W–L	Date	Tournament	Tier	Surface	Partner	Opponents	Score
Loss	0–1	Apr 2008	Valencia Open, Spain	International	Clay	(United States) Travis Parrott	(Argentina) Máximo González (Argentina) Juan Mónaco	5–7, 5–7
Win	1–1	Jul 2008	Swiss Open Gstaad, Switzerland	International	Clay	(Czech Republic) Jaroslav Levinský	(Switzerland) Stéphane Bohli (Switzerland) Stanislas Wawrinka	3–6, 6–2, [11–9]
Win	2–1	Oct 2008	St. Petersburg Open, Russia	International	Hard (i)	(United States) Travis Parrott	(India) Rohan Bopanna (Belarus) Max Mirnyi	3–6, 7–6^{(7–4)}, [10–8]
Loss	2–2	Feb 2009	U.S. National Indoor, United States	500 Series	Hard (i)	(United States) Travis Parrott	(United States) Mardy Fish (The Bahamas) Mark Knowles	6–7^{(7–9)}, 1–6
Loss	2–3	Jun 2009	Eastbourne International, United Kingdom	250 Series	Grass	(United States) Travis Parrott	(Poland) Mariusz Fyrstenberg (Poland) Marcin Matkowski	4–6, 4–6
Win	3–3	Jul 2009	Swedish Open, Sweden	250 Series	Clay	(Czech Republic) Jaroslav Levinský	(Sweden) Robert Lindstedt (Sweden) Robin Söderling	1–6, 6–3, [10–7]
Loss	3–4	Jul 2009	German Open, Germany	500 Series	Clay	(Brazil) Marcelo Melo	(Sweden) Simon Aspelin (Australia) Paul Hanley	3–6, 3–6
Loss	3–5	Jul 2009	Swiss Open Gstaad, Switzerland	250 Series	Clay	(Czech Republic) Jaroslav Levinský	(Switzerland) Marco Chiudinelli (Switzerland) Michael Lammer	5–7, 3–6
Loss	3–6	Jun 2010	Halle Open, Germany	250 Series	Grass	(Czech Republic) Martin Damm	(Ukraine) Sergiy Stakhovsky (Russia) Mikhail Youzhny	6–4, 5–7, [7–10]
Win	4–6	Aug 2010	Croatia Open, Croatia	250 Series	Clay	(Czech Republic) Leoš Friedl	(Czech Republic) František Čermák (Slovakia) Michal Mertiňák	6–3, 7–6^{(9–7)}
Win	5–6	May 2011	Serbia Open, Serbia	250 Series	Clay	(Czech Republic) František Čermák	(Austria) Oliver Marach (Austria) Alexander Peya	7–5, 6–2
Loss	5–7	Jul 2011	German Open, Germany	500 Series	Clay	(Czech Republic) František Čermák	(Austria) Oliver Marach (Austria) Alexander Peya	4–6, 1–6
Win	6–7	Jul 2011	Swiss Open Gstaad, Switzerland (2)	250 Series	Clay	(Czech Republic) František Čermák	(Germany) Christopher Kas (Austria) Alexander Peya	6–3, 7–6^{(9–7)}
Loss	6–8	Oct 2011	Malaysian Open, Malaysia	250 Series	Hard (i)	(Czech Republic) František Čermák	(United States) Eric Butorac (Curaçao) Jean-Julien Rojer	1–6, 3–6
Loss	6–9	Oct 2011	Japan Open, Japan	500 Series	Hard	(Czech Republic) František Čermák	(United Kingdom) Andy Murray (United Kingdom) Jamie Murray	1–6, 4–6
Win	7–9	Oct 2011	Kremlin Cup, Russia	250 Series	Hard (i)	(Czech Republic) František Čermák	(Argentina) Carlos Berlocq (Spain) David Marrero	6–3, 6–1
Win	8–9	Jan 2012	Qatar Open, Qatar	250 Series	Hard	(Czech Republic) Lukáš Rosol	(Germany) Christopher Kas (Germany) Philipp Kohlschreiber	6–3, 6–4
Loss	8–10	Jan 2012	Auckland Open, New Zealand	250 Series	Hard	(Czech Republic) František Čermák	(Austria) Oliver Marach (Austria) Alexander Peya	3–6, 2–6
Win	9–10	May 2012	Bavarian Championships, Germany	250 Series	Clay	(Czech Republic) František Čermák	(Belgium) Xavier Malisse (Belgium) Dick Norman	6–4, 7–5
Loss	9–11	May 2012	Open de Nice Côte d'Azur, France	250 Series	Clay	(Austria) Oliver Marach	(United States) Bob Bryan (United States) Mike Bryan	6–7^{(5–7)}, 3–6
Loss	9–12	Oct 2012	Vienna Open, Austria	250 Series	Hard (i)	(Austria) Julian Knowle	(Germany) Andre Begemann (Germany) Martin Emmrich	4–6, 6–3, [4–10]
Loss	9–13	Jan 2013	Qatar Open, Qatar	250 Series	Hard	(Austria) Julian Knowle	(Germany) Christopher Kas (Germany) Philipp Kohlschreiber	5–7, 4–6
Win	10–13	Feb 2013	Zagreb Indoors, Croatia	250 Series	Hard (i)	(Austria) Julian Knowle	(Croatia) Ivan Dodig (Croatia) Mate Pavić	3–6, 3–6
Win	11–13	Apr 2013	Grand Prix Hassan II, Morocco	250 Series	Clay	(Austria) Julian Knowle	(Germany) Dustin Brown (Germany) Christopher Kas	6–3, 6–2
Loss	11–14	Jun 2019	Antalya Open, Turkey	250 Series	Grass	(Croatia) Ivan Dodig	(Israel) Jonathan Erlich (New Zealand) Artem Sitak	3–6, 4–6
Loss	11–15	Jul 2019	Swiss Open Gstaad, Switzerland	250 Series	Clay	(Austria) Philipp Oswald	(Belgium) Sander Gillé (Belgium) Joran Vliegen	4–6, 3–6
Win	12–15	Aug 2019	Austrian Open Kitzbühel, Austria	250 Series	Clay	(Austria) Philipp Oswald	(Belgium) Sander Gillé (Belgium) Joran Vliegen	6–4, 6–4
Win	13–15	Aug 2019	Cincinnati Masters, United States	Masters 1000	Hard	(Croatia) Ivan Dodig	(Colombia) Juan Sebastián Cabal (Colombia) Robert Farah	4–6, 6–4, [10–6]
Win	14–15	Oct 2019	China Open, China	500 Series	Hard	(Croatia) Ivan Dodig	(Poland) Łukasz Kubot (Brazil) Marcelo Melo	6–3, 7–6^{(7–4)}
Loss	14–16	Jan 2020	Adelaide International, Australia	250 Series	Hard	(Croatia) Ivan Dodig	(Argentina) Máximo González (France) Fabrice Martin	6–7^{(12–14)}, 3–6
Loss	14–17	Jan 2021	Antalya Open, Turkey	250 Series	Hard	(Croatia) Ivan Dodig	(Croatia) Nikola Mektić (Croatia) Mate Pavić	2–6, 4–6
Win	15–17	Feb 2021	Australian Open, Australia	Grand Slam	Hard	(Croatia) Ivan Dodig	(United States) Rajeev Ram (United Kingdom) Joe Salisbury	6–3, 6–4
Loss	15–18	Oct 2021	San Diego Open, United States	250 Series	Hard	(Australia) John Peers	(United Kingdom) Joe Salisbury (United Kingdom) Neal Skupski	6–7^{(2–7)}, 6–3, [5–10]
Win	16–18	Oct 2021	Indian Wells Masters, United States	Masters 1000	Hard	(Australia) John Peers	(Russia) Aslan Karatsev (Russia) Andrey Rublev	6–3, 7–6^{(7–5)}
Win	17–18	Jan 2022	Sydney International, Australia	250 Series	Hard	(Australia) John Peers	(Italy) Simone Bolelli (Italy) Fabio Fognini	7–5, 7–5

== Challenger and Futures finals ==
=== Singles: 3 (1–2) ===
Legend (singles) ATP Challenger Tour (0–0) ITF Futures Tour (1–2)	Titles by surface Hard (0–0) Clay (1–2) Grass (0–0) Carpet (0–0)

Result	W–L	Date	Tournament	Tier	Surface	Opponent	Score
Loss	0–1	Sep 2005	Algeria F1, Algiers	Futures	Clay	(Algeria) Lamine Ouahab	3–6, 0–6
Loss	0–2	Aug 2006	Iran F3, Tehran	Futures	Clay	(Germany) Bastian Knittel	3–6, 5–7
Win	1–2	Aug 2007	Slovak Rep. F3, Bratislava	Futures	Clay	(Slovakia) Ján Krošlák	6–4, 6–1

=== Doubles: 54 (33–21) ===
Legend (doubles) ATP Challenger Tour (16–11) ITF Futures Tour (17–10)	Titles by surface Hard (10–5) Clay (22–13) Grass (0–0) Carpet (1–3)

Result	W–L	Date	Tournament	Tier	Surface	Partner	Opponents	Score
Win	1–0	May 2004	Hungary F3, Miskolc	Futures	Clay	(Slovakia) Ladislav Švarc	(France) Xavier Audouy (France) Nicolas Tourte	6–3, 6–3
Loss	1–1	Jun 2004	Slovenia F1, Koper	Futures	Clay	(Czech Republic) Jiří Vencl	(Spain) Antonio Baldellou-Esteva (Spain) Germán Puentes Alcañiz	2–6, 5–7
Win	2–1	Jul 2004	Germany F1, Kassel	Futures	Clay	(Slovakia) Ladislav Švarc	(Brazil) Lucas Engel (Germany) Markus Schiller	6–4, 6–2
Loss	2–2	Sep 2004	Hungary F4, Sopron	Futures	Clay	(Slovakia) František Polyak	(Serbia and Montenegro) Nikola Ćirić (Serbia and Montenegro) Goran Tošić	1–6, 2–6
Loss	2–3	Oct 2004	Hungary F5, Budapest	Futures	Clay	(Czech Republic) Daniel Lustig	(Spain) Antonio Baldellou-Esteva (Spain) Germán Puentes Alcañiz	5–7, 6–3, 3–6
Loss	2–4	Oct 2004	Hungary F6, Kaposvár	Futures	Clay	(Czech Republic) Daniel Lustig	(Slovakia) Tomáš Banczi (Slovakia) Peter Miklušičák	7–5, 4–6, 6–7^{(5–7)}
Win	3–4	Sep 2005	Algeria F1, Algiers	Futures	Clay	(Czech Republic) Dušan Karol	(Tunisia) Walid Jallali (Germany) Alexander Satschko	4–6, 6–2, 6–4
Loss	3–5	Sep 2005	Algeria F2, Algiers	Futures	Clay	(Czech Republic) Filip Zeman	(Algeria) Abdelhak Hameurlaine (Algeria) Slimane Saoudi	4–6, 4–6
Win	4–5	Oct 2005	Czech Rep. F4, Průhonice	Futures	Hard (i)	(Czech Republic) Daniel Lustig	(Czech Republic) Michal Navrátil (Czech Republic) Mirko Zapletal	6–4, 6–2
Win	5–5	Oct 2005	Czech Rep. F5, Opava	Futures	Hard (i)	(Czech Republic) Daniel Lustig	(Russia) Evgeny Kirillov (Russia) Alexander Krasnorutskiy	6–4, 6–1
Win	6–5	Nov 2005	Czech Rep. F6, Frýdlant nad Ostravicí	Futures	Hard (i)	(Czech Republic) Daniel Lustig	(Czech Republic) Roman Kutáč (Czech Republic) Karel Tříska	6–3, 6–4
Win	7–5	Nov 2005	Prague, Czech Republic	Challenger	Carpet (i)	(Ukraine) Sergiy Stakhovsky	(United Kingdom) James Auckland (Netherlands) Jasper Smit	6–3, 3–6, 7–6^{(7–5)}
Win	8–5	May 2006	Czech Rep. F2, Jablonec nad Nisou	Futures	Clay	(Czech Republic) Daniel Lustig	(Slovakia) Marek Semjan (Czech Republic) Filip Zeman	6–2, 6–0
Win	9–5	Jun 2006	Czech Rep. F3, Karlovy Vary	Futures	Clay	(Czech Republic) Daniel Lustig	(Slovakia) Kamil Čapkovič (Slovakia) Pavol Červenák	6–3, 1–6, 6–1
Loss	9–6	Jul 2006	Iran F1, Tehran	Futures	Clay	(Slovakia) Viktor Bruthans	(Austria) Daniel Köllerer (Germany) Alexander Satschko	6–2, 2–6, 6–7^{(5–7)}
Loss	9–7	Jul 2006	Iran F2, Tehran	Futures	Clay	(Slovakia) Viktor Bruthans	(Austria) Daniel Köllerer (Germany) Alexander Satschko	5–7, 6–7^{(5–7)}
Win	10–7	Aug 2006	Slovak Rep. F1, Žilina	Futures	Clay	(Czech Republic) Daniel Lustig	(Slovakia) Peter Miklušičák (Slovakia) František Polyak	6–4, 6–1
Win	11–7	Aug 2006	Slovak Rep. F2, Piešťany	Futures	Clay	(Czech Republic) Daniel Lustig	(Slovakia) Marek Semjan (Slovakia) Ján Stančík	6–0, 7–5
Win	12–7	Sep 2006	Iran F4, Tehran	Futures	Clay	(Germany) Alexander Satschko	(Germany) Bastian Knittel (Germany) Nils Muschiol	6–3, 6–3
Loss	12–8	Sep 2006	Poland F12, Gliwice	Futures	Clay	(Poland) Robert Godlewski	(Russia) Denis Matsukevitch (Latvia) Deniss Pavlovs	7–6^{(7–5)}, 3–6, 4–6
Win	13–8	Nov 2006	Russia F1, Sergiev Posad	Futures	Hard (i)	(Germany) David Klier	(Russia) Alexander Krasnorutskiy (Russia) Alexander Kudryavtsev	7–6^{(8–6)}, 7–6^{(7–5)}
Loss	13–9	Dec 2006	Czech Rep. F4, Vendryně	Futures	Hard (i)	(Czech Republic) Daniel Lustig	(Czech Republic) Lukáš Rosol (Slovakia) Igor Zelenay	1–6, 1–6
Win	14–9	Mar 2007	France F5, Poitiers	Futures	Hard (i)	(Slovakia) Igor Zelenay	(Romania) Victor Ioniță (United States) Brian Wilson	6–4, 6–4
Win	15–9	Jun 2007	Košice, Slovakia	Challenger	Clay	(Czech Republic) Lukáš Rosol	(Italy) Leonardo Azzaro (Italy) Flavio Cipolla	6–1, 7–6^{(7–5)}
Win	16–9	Jul 2007	Oberstaufen, Germany	Challenger	Clay	(Slovakia) Igor Zelenay	(Germany) Peter Gojowczyk (Germany) Marc Sieber	7–5, 7–5
Win	17–9	Aug 2007	Slovak Rep. F3, Bratislava	Futures	Clay	(Slovakia) Igor Zelenay	(Slovakia) Viktor Bruthans (Slovakia) Ján Stančík	Walkover
Loss	17–10	Sep 2007	Düsseldorf, Germany	Challenger	Clay	(Slovakia) Igor Zelenay	(Italy) Fabio Colangelo (Germany) Philipp Marx	6–3, 3–6, [7–10]
Win	18–10	Sep 2007	Trnava, Slovakia	Challenger	Clay	(Slovakia) Igor Zelenay	(Argentina) Diego Junqueira (Spain) Rubén Ramírez Hidalgo	6–1, 6–4
Win	19–10	Oct 2007	Mons, Belgium	Challenger	Hard (i)	(Poland) Tomasz Bednarek	(Germany) Philipp Petzschner (Austria) Alexander Peya	6–2, 5–7, [10–8]
Loss	19–11	Oct 2007	Rennes, France	Challenger	Carpet (i)	(Slovakia) Igor Zelenay	(Germany) Philipp Petzschner (Germany) Björn Phau	2–6, 2–6
Loss	19–12	Feb 2008	Belgrade, Serbia	Challenger	Carpet (i)	(Italy) Alessandro Motti	(Italy) Flavio Cipolla (Greece) Konstantinos Economidis	6–4, 2–6, [8–10]
Win	20–12	Mar 2008	San Luis Potosí, Mexico	Challenger	Clay	(United States) Travis Parrott	(Netherlands Antilles) Jean-Julien Rojer (Brazil) Márcio Torres	6–2, 6–1
Win	21–12	Mar 2008	León, Mexico	Challenger	Hard	(United States) Travis Parrott	(United States) Brendan Evans (United States) Alex Kuznetsov	6–4, 6–1
Loss	21–13	Aug 2008	Segovia, Spain	Challenger	Hard	(Czech Republic) Jaroslav Levinský	(United Kingdom) Ross Hutchins (United States) Jim Thomas	6–7^{(3–7)}, 6–3, [8–10]
Loss	21–14	Nov 2008	Aachen, Germany	Challenger	Carpet (i)	(United States) Travis Parrott	(Germany) Michael Kohlmann (Germany) Alexander Waske	4–6, 4–6
Win	22–14	Mar 2010	Sunrise, USA	Challenger	Hard	(Czech Republic) Martin Damm	(Czech Republic) Lukáš Dlouhý (India) Leander Paes	4–6, 6–1, [13–11]
Win	23–14	Oct 2010	Mons, Belgium	Challenger	Hard (i)	(Slovakia) Igor Zelenay	(Belgium) Ruben Bemelmans (Belgium) Yannick Mertens	3–6, 6–4, [10–5]
Loss	23–15	Oct 2010	Tashkent, Uzbekistan	Challenger	Hard	(Slovakia) Karol Beck	(United Kingdom) Ross Hutchins (United Kingdom) Jamie Murray	6–2, 4–6, [8–10]
Loss	23–16	Nov 2010	Bratislava, Slovakia	Challenger	Hard (i)	(United States) Travis Parrott	(United Kingdom) Colin Fleming (United Kingdom) Jamie Murray	2–6, 6–3, [6–10]
Win	24–16	Jul 2018	Czech Republic F5, Ústí nad Orlicí	Futures	Clay	(Czech Republic) Patrik Rikl	(Czech Republic) Antonín Bolardt (Czech Republic) Tomáš Macháč	7–6^{(7–2)}, 7–6^{(7–5)}
Loss	24–17	Jul 2018	Czech Republic F6, Brno	Futures	Clay	(Czech Republic) Patrik Rikl	(Czech Republic) Petr Nouza (Czech Republic) David Škoch	3–6, 6–2, [12–14]
Loss	24–18	Aug 2018	Liberec, Czech Republic	Challenger	Clay	(Czech Republic) Patrik Rikl	(Belgium) Sander Gillé (Belgium) Joran Vliegen	3–6, 4–6
Win	25–18	Aug 2018	Slovakia F3, Bratislava	Futures	Clay	(Ukraine) Danylo Kalenichenko	(Czech Republic) Petr Michnev (Czech Republic) Antonín Štěpánek	6–3, 6–2
Win	26–18	Aug 2018	Hungary F6, Győr	Futures	Clay	(Ukraine) Danylo Kalenichenko	(France) Sadio Doumbia (France) Fabien Reboul	6–4, 3–6, [19–17]
Loss	26–19	Sep 2018	Como, Italy	Challenger	Clay	(Slovakia) Martin Kližan	(Germany) Andre Begemann (Germany) Dustin Brown	6–3, 4–6, [5–10]
Loss	26–20	Sep 2018	Genova, Italy	Challenger	Clay	(Slovakia) Martin Kližan	(Germany) Kevin Krawietz (Germany) Andreas Mies	2–6, 6–3, [2–10]
Win	27–20	Sep 2018	Szczecin, Poland	Challenger	Clay	(Poland) Karol Drzewiecki	(Argentina) Guido Andreozzi (Argentina) Guillermo Durán	6–3, 6–4
Loss	27–21	Jan 2019	Koblenz, Germany	Challenger	Hard (i)	(Austria) Jürgen Melzer	(Czech Republic) Zdeněk Kolář (Czech Republic) Adam Pavlásek	3–6, 4–6
Win	28–21	Feb 2019	Budapest, Hungary	Challenger	Hard (i)	(Germany) Kevin Krawietz	(Italy) Filippo Baldi (Switzerland) Luca Margaroli	7–5, 7–6^{(7–5)}
Win	29–21	May 2019	Ostrava, Czech Republic	Challenger	Clay	(Switzerland) Luca Margaroli	(Netherlands) Thiemo de Bakker (Netherlands) Tallon Griekspoor	6–4, 2–6, [10–8]
Win	30–21	May 2019	Rome, Italy	Challenger	Clay	(Austria) Philipp Oswald	(Serbia) Nikola Čačić (Czech Republic) Adam Pavlásek	Walkover
Win	31–21	May 2019	Lisbon, Portugal	Challenger	Clay	(Austria) Philipp Oswald	(Argentina) Guido Andreozzi (Argentina) Guillermo Durán	7–5, 6–2
Win	32–21	Jun 2019	Prostějov, Czech Republic	Challenger	Clay	(Austria) Philipp Oswald	(Czech Republic) Jiří Lehečka (Czech Republic) Jiří Veselý	6–4, 7–6^{(7–4)}
Win	33–21	Jun 2019	Lyon, France	Challenger	Clay	(Austria) Philipp Oswald	(Italy) Simone Bolelli (Italy) Andrea Pellegrino	6–4, 7–6^{(7–2)}

== Doubles performance timeline ==
Key
W	F	SF	QF	#R	RR	Q#	DNQ	A	NH

(W) winner; (F) finalist; (SF) semifinalist; (QF) quarterfinalist; (#R) rounds 4, 3, 2, 1; (RR) round-robin stage; (Q#) qualification round; (DNQ) did not qualify; (A) absent; (NH) not held; (SR) strike rate (events won / competed); (W–L) win–loss record.
To avoid confusion and double counting, these charts are updated at the conclusion of a tournament or when the player's participation has ended.

Current through the 2022 Davis Cup.

Tournament	2008	2009	2010	2011	2012	2013	2014–17	2018	2019	2020	2021	2022	SR	W–L
Grand Slam tournaments
Australian Open	A	2R	2R	2R	3R	1R	A	A	A	SF	W	QF	1 / 8	18–7
French Open	1R	2R	1R	3R	2R	1R	A	A	A	3R	2R	1R	0 / 9	7–9
Wimbledon	3R	2R	3R	1R	1R	1R	A	A	SF	NH	2R	QF	0 / 9	13–9
US Open	1R	1R	2R	1R	QF	1R	A	A	1R	1R	SF	A	0 / 9	8–9
Win–loss	2–3	3–4	4–4	3–4	6–4	0–4	0–0	0–0	4–2	6–3	12–3	6–3	1 / 35	46–34
ATP World Tour Finals
ATP Finals	Did not qualify								RR	DNQ	RR	DNQ	0 / 2	2–4
ATP World Tour Masters 1000
Indian Wells Masters	A	2R	1R	A	A	A	A	A	A	NH	W	1R	1 / 4	6–3
Miami Open	A	2R	2R	A	1R	A	A	A	A	NH	SF	1R	0 / 5	5–5
Monte-Carlo Masters	A	A	A	A	2R	A	A	A	A	NH	2R	A	0 / 2	0–2
Madrid Open	A	A	A	A	2R	2R	A	A	A	NH	QF	1R	0 / 4	3–4
Italian Open	A	A	1R	A	1R	1R	A	A	A	1R	2R	1R	0 / 6	1–6
Canadian Open	A	1R	A	A	A	A	A	A	1R	NH	1R	A	0 / 3	0–3
Cincinnati Masters	A	1R	A	A	A	A	A	A	W	1R	2R	A	1 / 4	6–3
Shanghai Masters	A	2R	A	A	A	A	A	A	QF	NH			0 / 2	3–2
Paris Masters	A	1R	A	2R	1R	A	A	A	SF	A	SF	A	0 / 5	6–5
Win–loss	0–0	3–6	1–3	1–1	1–5	1–2	0–0	0–0	10–3	0–2	13–7	0–4	2 / 36	32–34
Career statistics
Titles	2	1	1	3	2	2	0	0	3	0	2	1	17	
Finals	3	5	2	6	5	3	0	0	5	1	4	1	35	
Overall win–loss	23–16	33–27	25–25	43–23	33–24	25–23	0–0	1–0	36–12	12–8	40–21	12–12	283–191	
Year-end ranking	36	31	43	24	32	54	–	163	13	17	9	90	59.7%	
