= Mikhail Youzhny career statistics =

Career finals
Discipline	Type	Won	Lost	Total	WR
Singles	Grand Slam tournaments	–	–	–	–
Singles	Year-end championships	–	–	–	–
Singles	ATP Masters 1000*	–	–	–	–
Singles	Olympic Games	–	–	–	–
Singles	ATP Tour 500	2	5	7	0.29
Singles	ATP Tour 250	8	6	14	0.57
Singles	Total	10	11	21	0.48
Doubles	Grand Slam tournaments	–	–	–	–
Doubles	Year-end championships	–	–	–	–
Doubles	ATP Masters 1000*	–	–	–	–
Doubles	Olympic Games	–	–	–	–
Doubles	ATP Tour 500	2	1	3	0.67
Doubles	ATP Tour 250	7	2	9	0.78
Doubles	Total	9	3	12	0.75
Total		19	14	33	0.58
1) WR = Winning Rate; 2) * formerly known as "Super 9" (1996–1999), "Tennis Masters Series" (2000–2003) or "ATP Masters Series" (2004–2008).

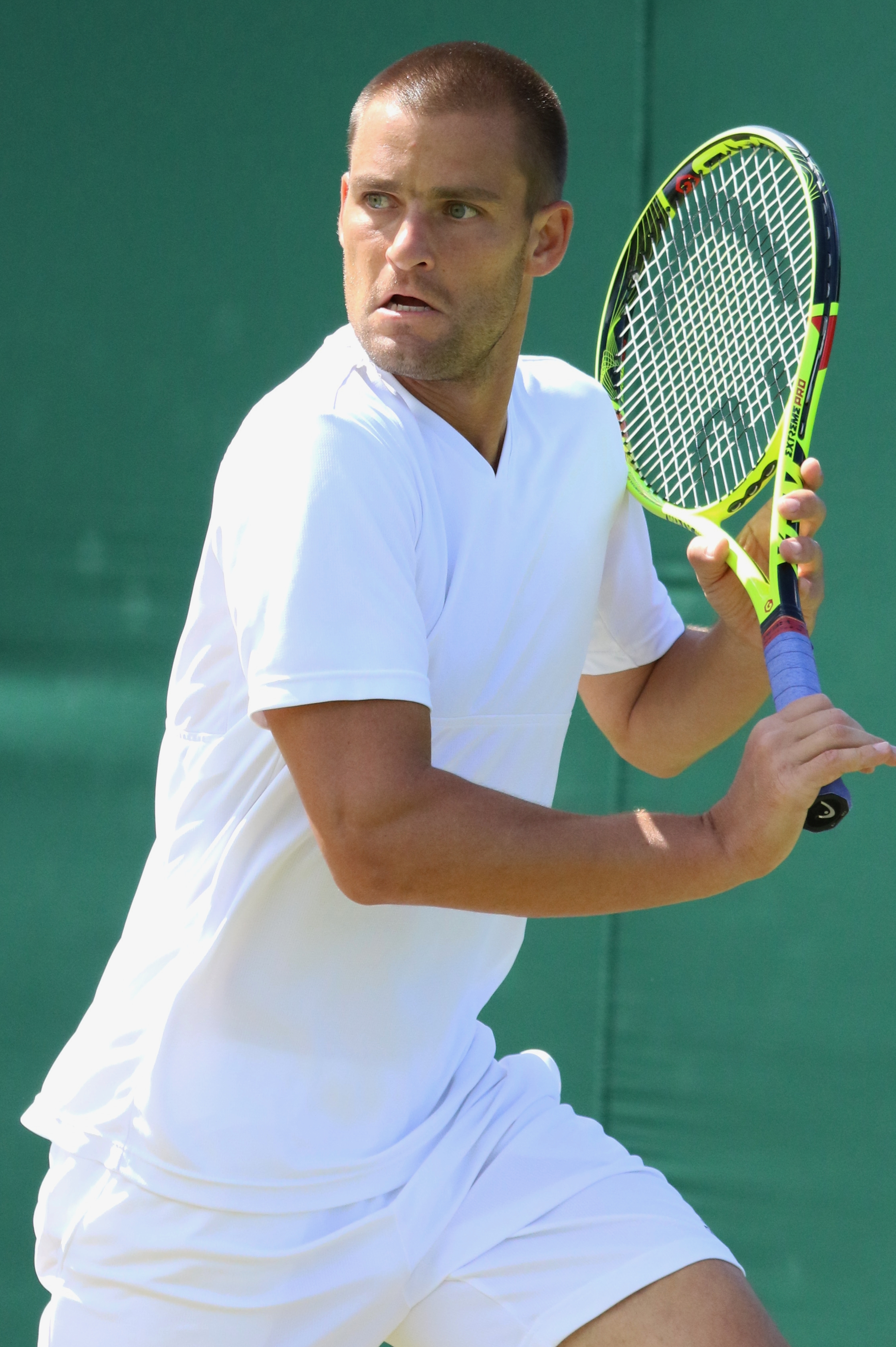
Youzhny at 2016 Wimbledon Championships

Mikhail Youzhny is a former professional tennis player from Russia who has won ten ATP singles titles, and nine ATP doubles titles in his career. During his junior career, Youzhny peaked at number 20 in the world junior rankings in early 2000, the year after reaching the boys' singles final at the 1999 Australian Open, losing to Kristian Pless of Denmark. He turned professional later in 1999, winning four futures tournaments to start his career. He started played on the ATP Challenger Circuit the same year, and won his first Challenger tournament in July 2000 against Jan Frode Andersen from Norway. While he debuted at the ATP World Tour in 1999, Youzhny won his first ATP title in July 2002 at the Mercedes Cup against Guillermo Cañas from Argentina.

Youzhny has reached the quarterfinals of all four Grand Slams, as of 2013 only 11 other active players have managed to do the same. He has reached a Grand Slam semifinal twice, both at the US Open, in 2006 and 2010. While chiefly a singles player, Youzhny has reached the quarterfinals of a grand slam in doubles twice, at the 2006 US Open and the 2014 Australian Open. He debuted within the top 10 in January 2008, but ended the year as a top 10 player for the only time in his career in 2010. As of 2020, Youzhny is second most successful Russian tennis player in history if considering match wins only, trailing behind Yevgeny Kafelnikov.

== Keys ==
Tables explanation
Result	If the player won or lost
No.	Listing how many finals the player won and lost
Date	The date in which the final was played
Tournament	The name of the event and its location
Surface	The court surface
Partner	The player he played doubles with in a specific tournament
Opponent(s)	A player or players he met in a specific round
Score	The match result
Rk	The player's official ATP ranking
Rd	In what round the players met each other in a tournament
Year/Yr	The year in which the match or tournament was played

Abbreviations used
W	Won tournament
F	reached Final
SF	reached Semifinal
QF	reached quarterfinal
#R	reached Round 4, 3, 2, 1
RR	competed at a round robin stage
Q#	lost in Qualification round 3, 2, 1
A	absent from a tournament
P	participated in a team event
Z#	played in a Davis Cup Zonal Group (with its number indication)
PO	played in a Davis Cup Play-off
G	won a gold medal at the Olympics
S	won a silver medal at the Olympics
SF-B	won a bronze medal at the Olympics (from 1908 to 1924 and 1996–present, awarded to the winner of a play-off match between losing semifinalists)
NMS	played in a Masters Series 1000 tournament that was relegated (Not a Masters Series)
NH	tournament was not held in a given year
(i)	tournament or match played indoors

== ATP career finals ==
=== Singles: 21 (10 titles, 11 runner-ups) ===
Legend Grand Slam tournaments (0–0) ATP World Tour Finals (0–0) ATP World Tour Masters 1000 (0–0) ATP World Tour 500 Series (2–5) ATP World Tour 250 Series (8–6)	Titles by surface Hard (6–8) Clay (3–2) Grass (0–1) Carpet (1–0)	Titles by setting Outdoors (4–7) Indoors (6–4)

Result	W–L	Date	Category	Tournament	Surface	Opponent	Score
Win	1–0	Jul 2002	250 series	Stuttgart Open, Germany	Clay	(Argentina) Guillermo Cañas	6–3, 3–6, 3–6, 6–4, 6–4
Loss	1–1	Oct 2002	250 series	St. Petersburg Open, Russia	Hard (i)	(France) Sébastien Grosjean	5–7, 4–6
Loss	1–2	Sep 2004	250 series	China Open, China	Hard	(Russia) Marat Safin	6–7^{(4–7)}, 5–7
Win	2–2	Oct 2004	250 series	St. Petersburg Open, Russia	Carpet (i)	(Slovakia) Karol Beck	6–2, 6–2
Win	3–2	Feb 2007	500 series	Rotterdam Open, Netherlands	Hard (i)	(Croatia) Ivan Ljubičić	6–2, 6–4
Loss	3–3	Mar 2007	500 series	Dubai Tennis Championships, United Arab Emirates	Hard	(Switzerland) Roger Federer	4–6, 3–6
Loss	3–4	May 2007	250 series	Bavarian International Tennis Championships, Germany	Clay	(Germany) Philipp Kohlschreiber	6–2, 3–6, 4–6
Win	4–4	Jan 2008	250 series	Chennai Open, India	Hard	(Spain) Rafael Nadal	6–0, 6–1
Loss	4–5	May 2009	250 series	Bavarian International Tennis Championships, Germany	Clay	(Czech Republic) Tomáš Berdych	4–6, 6–4, 6–7^{(5–7)}
Loss	4–6	Oct 2009	500 series	Rakuten Japan Open Tennis Championships, Japan	Hard	(France) Jo-Wilfried Tsonga	3–6, 3–6
Win	5–6	Oct 2009	250 series	Kremlin Cup, Russia	Hard (i)	(Serbia) Janko Tipsarević	6–7^{(5–7)}, 6–0, 6–4
Loss	5–7	Nov 2009	500 series	Valencia Open 500, Spain	Hard (i)	(United Kingdom) Andy Murray	3–6, 2–6
Loss	5–8	Feb 2010	500 series	Rotterdam Open, Netherlands	Hard (i)	(Sweden) Robin Söderling	4–6, 0–2, ret.
Loss	5–9	Feb 2010	500 series	Dubai Tennis Championships, United Arab Emirates	Hard	(Serbia) Novak Djokovic	5–7, 7–5, 3–6
Win	6–9	May 2010	250 series	Bavarian International Tennis Championships, Germany	Clay	(Croatia) Marin Čilić	6–3, 4–6, 6–4
Win	7–9	Oct 2010	250 series	Malaysian Open, Malaysia	Hard (i)	(Kazakhstan) Andrey Golubev	6–7^{(2–7)}, 6–2, 7–6^{(7–3)}
Loss	7–10	Oct 2010	250 series	St. Petersburg Open, Russia	Hard (i)	(Kazakhstan) Mikhail Kukushkin	3–6, 6–7^{(2–7)}
Win	8–10	Feb 2012	250 series	Zagreb Indoors, Croatia	Hard (i)	(Slovakia) Lukáš Lacko	6–2, 6–3
Loss	8–11	Jun 2013	250 series	Gerry Weber Open, Germany	Grass	(Switzerland) Roger Federer	7–6^{(7–5)}, 3–6, 4–6
Win	9–11	Jul 2013	250 series	Swiss Open, Switzerland	Clay	(Netherlands) Robin Haase	6–3, 6–4
Win	10–11	Oct 2013	500 series	Valencia Open 500, Spain	Hard (i)	(Spain) David Ferrer	6–3, 7–5

=== Doubles: 12 (9 titles, 3 runner-ups) ===
Legend Grand Slam tournaments (0–0) ATP World Tour Finals (0–0) ATP World Tour Masters 1000 (0–0) ATP World Tour 500 Series (2–1) ATP World Tour 250 Series (7–2)	Titles by surface Hard (4–2) Clay (1–1) Grass (3–0) Carpet (1–0)	Titles by setting Outdoors (7–3) Indoors (2–0)

Result	W–L	Date	Category	Tournament	Surface	Partner	Opponents	Score
Loss	0–1	Jan 2005	250 series	Qatar Open, Qatar	Hard	(Romania) Andrei Pavel	(Spain) Albert Costa (Spain) Rafael Nadal	3–6, 6–4, 3–6
Loss	0–2	Sep 2005	250 series	China Open, China	Hard	(Russia) Dmitry Tursunov	(United States) Justin Gimelstob (Australia) Nathan Healey	6–4, 3–6, 2–6
Win	1–2	Oct 2005	250 series	Kremlin Cup, Russia	Carpet (i)	(Belarus) Max Mirnyi	(Russia) Igor Andreev (Russia) Nikolay Davydenko	6–1, 6–1
Win	2–2	Jan 2007	250 series	Qatar Open, Qatar	Hard	(Serbia) Nenad Zimonjić	(Czech Republic) Martin Damm (India) Leander Paes	6–1, 7–6^{(7–3)}
Win	3–2	May 2007	250 series	Bavarian Championships, Germany	Clay	(Germany) Philipp Kohlschreiber	(Czech Republic) Jan Hájek | (Czech Republic) Jaroslav Levinský	6–1, 6–4
Loss	3–3	Feb 2008	500 series	Rotterdam Open, Netherlands	Clay	(Germany) Philipp Kohlschreiber	(Czech Republic) Tomáš Berdych (Russia) Dmitry Tursunov	5–7, 6–3, [7–10]
Win	4–3	Jun 2008	250 series	Gerry Weber Open, Germany	Grass	(Germany) Mischa Zverev	(Czech Republic) Lukáš Dlouhý (India) Leander Paes	3–6, 6–4, [10–3]
Win	5–3	Oct 2008	500 series	Japan Open, Japan	Hard	(Germany) Mischa Zverev	(Czech Republic) Lukáš Dlouhý (India) Leander Paes	6–3, 6–4
Win	6–3	Jun 2009	250 series	Queen's Club Championships, United Kingdom	Grass	(South Africa) Wesley Moodie	(Brazil) Marcelo Melo (Brazil) André Sá	6–4, 4–6, [10–6]
Win	7–3	Jun 2010	250 series	Gerry Weber Open, Germany	Grass	(Ukraine) Sergiy Stakhovsky	(Czech Republic) Martin Damm (Slovakia) Filip Polášek	4–6, 7–5, [10–7]
Win	8–3	Feb 2011	500 series	Dubai Tennis Championships, United Arab Emirates	Hard	(Ukraine) Sergiy Stakhovsky	(France) Jérémy Chardy (Spain) Feliciano López	4–6, 6–3, [10–3]
Win	9–3	Feb 2012	250 series	Zagreb Indoors, Croatia	Hard (i)	(Cyprus) Marcos Baghdatis	(Croatia) Ivan Dodig (Croatia) Mate Pavić	6–2, 6–2

== ATP Challenger Tour ==
=== Singles: 6 (5 title, 1 runner-up) ===
Result	No.	Date	Category	Tournament	Surface	Opponent	Score
Loss	1	28 February 2000	Challenger	Challenger La Manche, France	Hard (i)	(France) Julien Boutter	1–6, 0–6
Win	1	15 May 2000	Challenger	Samarkand Challenger, Uzbekistan	Clay	(Norway) Jan Frode Andersen	7–6^{(9–7)}, 2–6, 7–6^{(10–8)}
Win	2	2 November 2015	Challenger	Bauer Watertechnology Cup, Germany	Carpet (i)	(Germany) Benjamin Becker	7–5, 6–3
Win	3	10 January 2016	Challenger	KPN Bangkok Open, Thailand	Hard	(Japan) Go Soeda	6–3, 6–4
Win	4	17 January 2016	Challenger	KPN Bangkok Open II, Thailand	Hard	(Czech Republic) Adam Pavlásek	6–4, 6–1
Win	5	24 January 2016	Challenger	Philippine Open, Philippines	Hard	(Switzerland) Marco Chiudinelli	6–4, 6–4
Win	6	16 October 2017	Challenger	Ningbo Challenger, China	Hard	(Japan) Taro Daniel	6–1, 6–1

=== Doubles: 2 (1 title, 1 runner-up) ===
Result	No.	Date	Category	Tournament	Surface	Partner	Opponents	Score
Win	1	3 July 2000	Challenger	Ulm Challenger, Germany	Hard	(Bulgaria) Orlin Stanoytchev	(Germany) Tomas Behrend (Germany) Karsten Braasch	6–7^{(2–7)}, 7–5, 6–0
Loss	1	26 March 2001	Challenger	Barletta Open, Italy	Hard	(Germany) Tomas Behrend	(Spain) Germán Puentes (Spain) Jairo Velasco Jr.	1–6, 0–1 ret.

== ITF Men's Circuit ==
=== Singles: 4 (4 titles) ===
Result	No.	Date	Category	Tournament	Surface	Opponent	Score
Win	1	23 August 1999	Futures	Belarus F1, Belarus	Grass	(France) Michaël Llodra	6–3, 6–4
Win	2	30 August 1999	Futures	Russia F2, Russia	Hard	(China) Zhu Benqiang	6–4, 6–2
Win	3	4 October 1999	Futures	Great Britain F10, United Kingdom	Hard(i)	(United Kingdom) Tom Spinks	6–3, 7–6^{(7–3)}
Win	4	11 October 1999	Futures	Great Britain F11, United Kingdom	Hard	(Norway) Helge Koll-Frafjord	3–6, 6–4, 6–2

=== Doubles 1 (1 title) ===
Result	No.	Date	Category	Tournament	Surface	Partner	Opponents	Score
Win	1	30 October 1999	Futures	Russia F2, Russia	Hard	(Russia) Andrei Youzhny	(China) Li Si (China) Ran Xu	2–6, 6–4, 6–4

== ITF Junior Circuit ==
=== Singles: 2 (1 title, 1 runner-up) ===
Result	No.	Date	Category	Tournament	Surface	Opponent	Score
Win	1	1 February 1998	Grade 2	Slovak Junior Indoor Tournament, Slovakia	Carpet	(Slovakia) František Babej	7–6, 6–4
Loss	1	31 January 1999	Grade A	Australian Open, Australia	Hard	(Denmark) Kristian Pless	4–6, 3–6

=== Doubles: 4 (3 titles, 1 runner-up) ===
Result	No.	Date	Category	Tournament	Surface	Partner	Opponents	Score
Loss	1	20 April 1997	Grade 4	Ozerov Cup, Russia	Clay	(Russia) Nikolay Davydenko	(Belarus) Maxim Belski (Russia) Igor Kunitsyn	2–6, 3–6
Win	1	30 August 1997	Grade 4	BB Cup, Hungary	Clay	(Russia) Igor Kunitsyn	(Czech Republic) Josef Neštický (Slovenia) Igor Ogrinc	6–2, 6–3
Win	2	14 September 1997	Grade 5	Pelican Bowl, Bulgaria	Hard	(Russia) Andrei Ioujnyi	(Belarus) Sergei Samoseiko (Belarus) Sergey Vassine	3–6, 6–3, 6–3
Win	3	14 September 1997	Grade 3	Ozerov Cup, Russia	Clay	(Russia) Philipp Mukhoemetov	(Russia) Kirill Nekrasov (Uzbekistan) Denis Kurmatov	3–6, 6–4, 6–2

== Singles Grand Slam seedings ==
Not seeded at all, or not seeded inside the top 10 Seeded 10–4 Seeded no. 3 Seeded no. 2 Seeded no. 1

Year	Australian Open	French Open	Wimbledon	US Open
2001	not seeded	not seeded	not seeded	not seeded
2002	not seeded	not seeded	not seeded	did not play
2003	25th	27th	16th	not seeded
2004	not seeded	31st	not seeded	not seeded
2005	15th	29th	31st	24th
2006	not seeded	not seeded	not seeded	not seeded
2007	25th	13th	14th	11th
2008	14th	15th	17th	did not play
2009	not seeded	not seeded	not seeded	not seeded
2010	20th	11th	13th	12th
2011	10th	12th	18th	16th
2012	not seeded	27th	26th	28th
2013	23rd	29th	20th	21st
2014	14th	15th	17th	21st
2015	not seeded	not seeded	not seeded	not seeded
2016	did not play	not seeded	not seeded	not seeded
2017	not seeded	not seeded	not seeded	not seeded
2018	not seeded	not seeded	not seeded	not seeded

== Performance timelines ==
Key
W	F	SF	QF	#R	RR	Q#	P#	DNQ	A	Z#	PO	G	S	B	NMS	NTI	P	NH

(W) winner; (F) finalist; (SF) semifinalist; (QF) quarterfinalist; (#R) rounds 4, 3, 2, 1; (RR) round-robin stage; (Q#) qualification round; (P#) preliminary round; (DNQ) did not qualify; (A) absent; (Z#) Davis/Fed Cup Zonal Group (with number indication) or (PO) play-off; (G) gold, (S) silver or (B) bronze Olympic/Paralympic medal; (NMS) not a Masters tournament; (NTI) not a Tier I tournament; (P) postponed; (NH) not held; (SR) strike rate (events won / competed); (W–L) win–loss record.

=== Singles ===
Tournament	1999	2000	2001	2002	2003	2004	2005	2006	2007	2008	2009	2010	2011	2012	2013	2014	2015	2016	2017	2018	SR	W–L
Grand Slam tournaments
Australian Open	A	A	3R	3R	4R	1R	2R	1R	3R	QF	1R	3R	3R	1R	2R	2R	1R	A	1R	1R	0 / 17	20–16
French Open	A	Q1	1R	1R	2R	3R	2R	2R	4R	3R	2R	QF	3R	3R	4R	2R	1R	1R	1R	1R	0 / 18	23–18
Wimbledon	A	A	4R	4R	2R	1R	4R	3R	4R	4R	1R	2R	4R	QF	4R	2R	1R	2R	2R	1R	0 / 18	32–18
US Open	A	A	3R	A	1R	3R	3R	SF	2R	A	2R	SF	1R	1R	QF	1R	2R	3R	2R	1R	0 / 16	26–16
Win–loss	0–0	0–0	7–4	5–3	5–4	4–4	7–4	8–4	9–4	9–3	2–4	12–3	7–4	6–4	11–4	3–4	1–4	3–3	2–4	0–4	0 / 69	101–68
ATP World Tour Masters 1000
Indian Wells Masters	A	A	A	Q1	1R	4R	2R	1R	2R	3R	1R	A	A	A	2R	A	1R	2R	2R	1R	0 / 12	6–11
Miami Open	A	A	A	A	2R	1R	2R	1R	3R	4R	2R	QF	3R	A	3R	A	2R	2R	1R	3R	0 / 14	13–14
Monte-Carlo Masters	A	A	3R	A	1R	A	A	1R	2R	2R	Q2	2R	1R	1R	2R	1R	1R	Q2	Q2	A	0 / 11	4–11
Madrid Open	not held			3R	1R	1R	1R	A	2R	1R	A	2R	1R	2R	3R	2R	A	Q2	Q2	Q2	0 / 11	7–11
Italian Open	A	A	Q2	A	1R	1R	1R	2R	3R	A	2R	1R	1R	2R	2R	3R	A	A	A	Q2	0 / 11	8–11
German Open	A	A	A	1R	3R	QF	2R	1R	1R	1R	not Masters Series										0 / 7	6–7
Canadian Open	A	A	A	A	1R	2R	1R	2R	3R	2R	3R	2R	1R	2R	2R	1R	3R	2R	1R	2R	0 / 16	13–16
Cincinnati Masters	A	A	A	A	3R	2R	QF	2R	2R	1R	2R	1R	1R	1R	2R	3R	Q2	2R	1R	A	0 / 14	13–14
Shanghai Masters	not held										A	2R	1R	1R	1R	QF	A	1R	Q1	A	0 / 6	3–6
Stuttgart Masters	A	A	Q2	not held																	0 / 0	0–0
Paris Masters	A	A	Q1	A	1R	QF	A	A	QF	1R	A	2R	1R	1R	1R	1R	A	Q1	A	A	0 / 9	6–9
Win–loss	0–0	0–0	2–1	2–2	4–9	11–8	4–7	3–7	10–9	4–8	5–5	5–8	1–8	3–7	7–9	8–7	3–4	4–4	1–4	2–3	0 / 111	79–110
National representation
Summer Olympics	NH	A	not held			QF	not held			3R	not held			1R	not held			A	not held		0 / 3	5–3
Davis Cup	A	QF	QF	W	QF	1R	QF	W	F	SF	QF	QF	PO	1R	A	A	A	A	A	A	2 / 12	15–11
Career statistics
	1999	2000	2001	2002	2003	2004	2005	2006	2007	2008	2009	2010	2011	2012	2013	2014	2015	2016	2017	2018	Career	
Tournaments	1	8	18	23	26	27	21	22	25	21	28	21	22	23	26	24	24	20	20	18	418	
Titles	0	0	0	1	0	1	0	0	1	1	1	2	0	1	2	0	0	0	0	0	10	
Finals	0	0	0	2	0	2	0	0	3	1	4	5	0	1	3	0	0	0	0	0	21	
Overall win–loss	0–1	6–8	20–20	31–24	29–27	42–27	23–23	25–21	50–24	28–22	42–28	43–19	27–24	33–21	39–24	18–23	9–24	17–18	10–20	7–18	499–416	
Year-end ranking	328	113	59	32	43	16	44	24	19	33	19	10	35	25	15	48	127	57	84	115	54.54%	

=== Doubles ===
Tournament	2001	2002	2003	2004	2005	2006	2007	2008	2009	2010	2011	2012	2013	2014	2015	2016	2017	2018	SR	W–L
Grand Slam tournaments
Australian Open	A	1R	1R	1R	1R	A	1R	1R	1R	1R	2R	1R	3R	QF	1R	A	1R	A	0 / 14	6–14
French Open	A	A	A	1R	2R	3R	A	A	A	2R	2R	1R	1R	1R	2R	1R	1R	A	0 / 11	6–11
Wimbledon	A	A	A	1R	A	1R	A	A	A	A	A	A	A	1R	1R	1R	A	A	0 / 5	0–5
US Open	A	A	1R	2R	3R	QF	A	A	A	3R	3R	2R	3R	1R	A	1R	1R	A	0 / 11	13–10
Win–loss	0–0	0–1	0–2	1–4	3–3	5–3	0–1	0–1	0–1	3–3	4–3	1–3	4–3	3–4	1–3	0–3	0–3	0–0	0 / 41	25–40
ATP World Tour Masters 1000
Indian Wells Masters	A	A	A	A	1R	2R	A	1R	A	A	A	A	A	1R	A	A	A	A	0 / 4	1–3
Miami Open	A	A	A	A	A	1R	A	A	A	2R	2R	A	2R	A	A	A	A	A	0 / 4	3–4
Monte-Carlo Masters	A	A	A	A	A	A	A	A	A	2R	QF	A	2R	SF	A	A	A	A	0 / 4	7–4
Madrid Open	NH	A	A	A	A	1R	A	1R	A	A	1R	A	1R	1R	A	A	A	A	0 / 5	0–5
Italian Open	A	A	A	A	A	A	A	A	A	1R	A	A	A	2R	A	A	A	A	0 / 2	1–2
German Open	A	A	A	A	A	A	A	1R	not Masters Series										0 / 1	0–1
Canadian Open	A	A	2R	A	2R	A	A	QF	A	QF	2R	1R	2R	1R	A	A	A	A	0 / 8	7–8
Cincinnati Masters	A	A	A	2R	2R	QF	A	A	A	1R	1R	1R	2R	1R	A	A	A	A	0 / 8	5–8
Shanghai Masters	not held									1R	A	A	A	QF	A	A	A	A	0 / 2	2–2
Stuttgart Masters	1R	not held																	0 / 1	0–1
Paris Masters	A	A	A	A	A	A	A	A	A	2R	A	A	A	A	A	A	A	A	0 / 1	1–0
Win–loss	0–1	0–0	1–1	1–1	2–3	3–3	0–0	2–4	0–0	5–6	4–5	0–2	4–5	6–7	0–0	0–0	0–0	0–0	0 / 40	28–38
National representation
Summer Olympics	not held			1R	not held			2R	not held			2R	not held			A	not held		0 / 3	2–3
Davis Cup	QF	W	QF	1R	QF	W	F	SF	QF	QF	PO	1R	A	A	A	A	A	A	2 / 12	6–6
Career statistics
	2001	2002	2003	2004	2005	2006	2007	2008	2009	2010	2011	2012	2013	2014	2015	2016	2017	2018	Career	
Titles	0	0	0	0	1	0	2	2	1	1	1	1	0	0	0	0	0	0	9	
Finals	0	0	0	0	3	0	2	3	1	1	1	1	0	0	0	0	0	0	12	
Year-end ranking	298	223	169	125	47	68	95	65	122	69	60	121	74	72	379	NA	819	1025		

== Top 10 wins ==
Type	2002	2003	2004	2005	2006	2007	2008	2009	2010	2011	2012	2013	2014	2015	2016	2017	Total
Singles	1	4	5	0	3	4	2	4	2	0	2	2	1	0	1	0	31
Doubles	0	0	0	0	2	2	3	1	1	2	0	3	1	0	0	0	15

=== Singles ===
#	Opponent	Rk	Category	Tournament	Yr	Surface	Rd	Score
1	Tommy Haas (GER)	7	250 series	Bavarian International Tennis Championships, Germany	2002	Clay	QF	6–2, 2–0 ret.
2	Jiří Novák (CZE)	7	Grand Slam	Australian Open, Australia	2003	Hard	3R	6–1, 3–6, 6–3, 6–2
3	Jiří Novák (CZE)	10	Masters 1000	Hamburg Masters, Germany	2003	Clay	1R	6–1, 6–4
4	Jiří Novák (CZE)	10	250 series	Gerry Weber Open, Germany	2003	Grass	QF	6–4, 6–4
5	Jiří Novák (CZE)	9	500 series	Stuttgart Open, Germany	2003	Clay	3R	7–6^{(7–1)}, 6–4
6	Rainer Schüttler (GER)	6	250 series	Qatar Open, Qatar	2004	Hard	1R	6–3, 7–6^{(7–5)}
7	Guillermo Coria (ARG)	4	500 series	Dubai Tennis Championships, United Arab Emirates	2004	Hard	1R	4–6, 6–3, 6–4
8	David Nalbandian (ARG)	6	Masters 1000	Canada Masters, Canada	2004	Hard	1R	3–6, 6–3, 6–4
9	David Nalbandian (ARG)	9	Grand Slam	US Open, United States	2004	Hard	2R	6–7^{(4–7)}, 6–4, 7–5, 2–6, 6–4
10	Tim Henman (GBR)	8	Masters 1000	Paris Masters, France	2004	Hard	3R	7–5, 6–1
11	Tommy Robredo (ESP)	5	Grand Slam	US Open, United States	2006	Hard	4R	6–2, 6–1, 6–0
12	Rafael Nadal (ESP)	2	Grand Slam	US Open, United States	2006	Hard	QF	6–3, 5–7, 7–6^{(7–5)}, 6–1
13	James Blake (USA)	9	Davis Cup	St. Petersburg, Russia	2006	Hard	RR	7–5, 1–6, 6–1, 7–5
14	Ivan Ljubičić (CRO)	8	500 series	Rotterdam Open, Netherlands	2007	Hard	F	6–2, 6–4
15	Rafael Nadal (ESP)	2	500 series	Dubai Tennis Championships, United Arab Emirates	2007	Hard	QF	7–6^{(7–5)}, 6–3
16	Fernando González (CHI)	9	Masters 1000	Paris Masters, France	2007	Hard	2R	3–6, 6–3, 6–3
17	Tommy Haas (GER)	10	Masters 1000	Paris Masters, France	2007	Hard	3R	6–4, 1–6, 6–3
18	Rafael Nadal (ESP)	2	250 series	Chennai Open, India	2008	Hard	F	6–0, 6–1
19	Nikolay Davydenko (RUS)	4	Grand Slam	Australian Open, Australia	2008	Hard	4R	7–6^{(7–2)}, 6–3, 6–1
20	Gilles Simon (FRA)	7	250 series	Queen's Club Championships, United Kingdom	2009	Grass	3R	6–1, 2–6, 6–2
21	Gilles Simon (FRA)	10	500 series	Japan Open Tennis Championships, Japan	2009	Hard	2R	7–6^{(7–5)}, 6–7^{(5–7)}, 6–4
22	Jo-Wilfried Tsonga (FRA)	9	500 series	Valencia Open 500, Spain	2009	Hard	1R	6–7^{(3–7)}, 6–0, 3–0 ret.
23	Nikolay Davydenko (RUS)	7	500 series	Valencia Open 500, Spain	2009	Hard	SF	3–6, 6–4, 6–3
24	Novak Djokovic (SRB)	2	500 series	Rotterdam Open, Netherlands	2010	Hard	SF	7–6^{(7–5)}, 7–6^{(8–6)}
25	Jo-Wilfried Tsonga (FRA)	10	Grand Slam	French Open, France	2010	Clay	4R	6–2 ret.
26	Mardy Fish (USA)	8	500 series	Dubai Tennis Championships, United Arab Emirates	2012	Hard	2R	6–2, 7–6^{(7–0)}
27	Janko Tipsarević (SRB)	8	Grand Slam	Wimbledon, United Kingdom	2012	Grass	3R	6–3, 6–4, 3–6, 6–3
28	Richard Gasquet (FRA)	9	250 series	Gerry Weber Open, Germany	2013	Grass	SF	6–3, 6–2
29	David Ferrer (ESP)	3	500 series	Valencia Open 500, Spain	2013	Hard(i)	F	6–3, 7–5
30	Jo-Wilfried Tsonga (FRA)	10	Masters 1000	Cincinnati Masters, United States	2014	Hard	1R	6–1, 6–4
31	Milos Raonic (CAN)	6	250 Series	St. Petersburg Open, Russia	2016	Hard	2R	2–6, 7–6^{(8–6)}, 6–4

=== Doubles ===
#	Partner	Opponents	Rk	Category	Tournament	Yr	Surface	Rd	Score
1	Yevgeny Kafelnikov (RUS)	Martin Damm (CZE); Cyril Suk (CZE)	10; 11	Davis Cup	Davis Cup, Czech Republic	2003	Clay (i)	1R	7–6^{(7–1)}, 4–6, 6–3, 6–3
2	Marat Safin (RUS)	Max Mirnyi (BLR); Alexander Shvets (BLR)	3; 0	Davis Cup	Davis Cup, Belarus	2004	Carpet (i)	1R	6–4, 7–5, 7–6^{(7–4)}
3	Marat Safin (RUS)	Kevin Ullyett (ZIM); Paul Hanley (AUS)	7; 8	Masters 1000	Cincinnati Masters, United States	2006	Hard	2R	1–6, 7–6^{(7–4)}, [10–7]
4	Leoš Friedl (CZE)	Bob Bryan (USA); Mike Bryan (USA)	1; 1	Grand Slam	US Open, United States	2006	Hard	3R	6–7^{(5–7)}, 7–6^{(7–2)}, 6–4
5	Nenad Zimonjić (SRB)	Martin Damm (CZE); Leander Paes (IND)	9; 12	250 series	Qatar Open, Qatar	2007	Hard	F	6–1, 7–6^{(7–3)}
6	František Čermák (CZE)	Jonas Björkman (SWE); Max Mirnyi (BLR)	6; 8	250 series	St. Petersburg Open, Russia	2007	Hard	2R	0–6, 6–4, [10–8]
7	Philipp Kohlschreiber (GER)	Julian Knowle (AUT); Simon Aspelin (SWE)	6; 8	500 series	Rotterdam Open, Netherlands	2008	Hard	SF	7–6^{(7–5)}, 7–5
8	Paul-Henri Mathieu (FRA)	Julian Knowle (AUT); Simon Aspelin (SWE)	10; 11	Masters 1000	Canada Masters, Canada	2008	Hard	2R	6–4, retired
9	Mischa Zverev (GER)	Leander Paes (IND); Lukáš Dlouhý (CZE)	8; 11	500 series	Japan Open, Japan	2008	Hard	F	6–3, 6–4
10	Wesley Moodie (RSA)	Kevin Ullyett (ZIM); Bruno Soares (BRA)	7; 15	250 series	Queen's Club Championships, United Kingdom	2009	Grass	2R	6–3, 7–6^{(8–6)}
11	Igor Andreev (RUS)	Mark Knowles (BHS); Mardy Fish (USA)	7; 40	Masters 1000	Miami Masters, United States	2010	Hard	1R	7–5, 6–4
12	Sergiy Stakhovsky (UKR)	Lukáš Dlouhý (CZE); Paul Hanley (AUS)	9; 29	500 series	Dubai Tennis Championships, United Arab Emirates	2011	Hard	1R	3–6, 6–4, [10–3]
13	Sergiy Stakhovsky (UKR)	Jürgen Melzer (AUT); Philipp Petzschner (GER)	8; 9	Masters 1000	Monte-Carlo Masters, Monaco	2011	Clay	2R	6–1, 7–6^{(8–6)}
14	Marcos Baghdatis (CYP)	Horia Tecău (ROM); Robert Lindstedt (SWE)	8; 9	250 series	Zagreb Indoors, Croatia	2013	Hard	1R	6–2, 6–1
15	Jonathan Erlich (ISR)	Marc López (ESP); Marcel Granollers (ESP)	3; 4	500 series	Dubai Tennis Championships, United Arab Emirates	2013	Hard	QF	6–3, 6–4
16	Max Mirnyi (BLR)	Bob Bryan (USA); Mike Bryan (USA)	1; 1	Masters 1000	Miami Masters, United States	2013	Hard	1R	6–4, 2–6, [10–5]
17	Max Mirnyi (BLR)	Alexander Peya (AUT); Bruno Soares (BRA)	3; 3	Masters 1000	Monte-Carlo Masters, Monaco	2014	Clay	QF	7–6^{(7–5)}, 3–6, [11–9]
18	Lukáš Rosol (CZE)	Daniel Nestor (CAN); Nenad Zimonjić (SRB)	4; 5	Masters 1000	Shanghai Masters, China	2014	Hard	2R	7–6^{(8–6)}, 6–2
19	Robin Haase (NED)	Marc López (SPA); Marcel Granollers (SPA)	5; 7	Grand Slam	Roland Garros, France	2015	Clay	1R	6–3, 7–6^{(7–5)}

== National participation ==
=== Davis Cup ===
==== Wins: 2 ====
Edition	Russian team	Rd	Score
2002	Marat Safin; Yevgeny Kafelnikov; Mikhail Youzhny; Andrei Stoliarov	1R	RUS 3–2 SWI
2002	Marat Safin; Yevgeny Kafelnikov; Mikhail Youzhny; Andrei Stoliarov	QF	RUS 4–1 SWE
2002	Marat Safin; Yevgeny Kafelnikov; Mikhail Youzhny; Andrei Stoliarov	SF	RUS 3–2 ARG
2002	Marat Safin; Yevgeny Kafelnikov; Mikhail Youzhny; Andrei Stoliarov	F	FRA 2–3 RUS
2006	Dmitry Tursunov; Nikolay Davydenko; Igor Andreev; Mikhail Youzhny; Marat Safin	1R	NED 0–5 RUS
2006	Dmitry Tursunov; Nikolay Davydenko; Igor Andreev; Mikhail Youzhny; Marat Safin	QF	FRA 1–4 RUS
2006	Dmitry Tursunov; Nikolay Davydenko; Igor Andreev; Mikhail Youzhny; Marat Safin	SF	RUS 3–2 USA
2006	Dmitry Tursunov; Nikolay Davydenko; Igor Andreev; Mikhail Youzhny; Marat Safin	F	RUS 3–2 ARG

==== Participations: 38 (21 wins, 17 losses) ====
Group membership World Group (21–17) Group I (0–0) Group II (0–0) Group III (0) Group IV (0)	Matches by Surface Hard (7–6) Clay (8–6) Grass (0–0) Carpet (6–5)

- ▲ ▼ indicates the result of the Davis Cup match followed by the score, date, place of event, the zonal classification and its phase, and the court surface.

Rubber result	No.	Rubber	Match type (partner if any)	Opponent nation	Opponent player(s)	Score
▲4–1; 4–6 February 2000; Olympic Stadium, Moscow, Russia; World Group first round; carpet surface
Win	1	IV	Singles (dead rubber)	Belgium	Olivier Rochus	7–6^{(8–6)}, 6–2
▼4–1; 6–8 April 2001; Baltic Hall, Malmö, Sweden; World Group quarterfinals; hard surface
Loss	2	II	Singles	Sweden	Magnus Norman	6–7^{(9–11)}, 4–6, 2–6
Loss	3	IV	Singles (dead rubber)	Sweden	Thomas Johansson	3–6, 6–2, 2–6
▲4–1; 5–7 April 2002; Luzhniki Palace of Sports, Moscow, Russia; World Group quarterfinal; clay surface
Loss	4	IV	Singles (dead rubber)	Sweden	Thomas Johansson	3–6, 4–6
▲3–2; 20–22 September 2002; Luzhniki Palace of Sports, Moscow, Russia; World Group semifinal; carpet surface
Loss	5	V	Singles (dead rubber)	Argentina	Juan Ignacio Chela	6–7^{(5–7)}, 7–6^{(7–3)}, 4–6
▲3–2; 29 November – 1 December 2002; Palais Omnisports de Paris-Bercy, Paris, France; World Group final; clay surface
Win	6	V	Singles (decisive)	France	Paul-Henri Mathieu	3–6, 2–6, 6–3, 7–5, 6–4
▲3–2; 7–9 February 2003; Palác kultury a sportu Ostrava-Vítkovice, Ostrava, Czech Republic; World Group first round; clay surface
Win	7	II	Singles	Czech Republic	Radek Štěpánek	3–6, 7–6^{(10–8)}, 6–7^{(6–8)}, 6–2, 6–3
Win	8	IV	Doubles (with Yevgeny Kafelnikov)	Czech Republic	Martin Damm / Cyril Suk	7–6^{(7–1)} 4–6, 6–3, 6–3
▼0–5; 4–6 April 2003; Club Atlético River Plate, Buenos Aires, Argentina, World Group quarterfinal; clay surface
Loss	9	III	Doubles (with Yevgeny Kafelnikov) (decisive)	Argentina	Lucas Arnold Ker / David Nalbandian	6–3, 3–6, 4–6, 3–6
Loss	10	IV	Singles (dead rubber)	Argentina	Mariano Zabaleta	4–6, 1–6
▼2–3; 6–8 February 2004; Football Manege, Minsk, Belarus; World Group first round; carpet surface
Win	11	III	Doubles (with Marat Safin)	Belarus	Max Mirnyi / Alexander Shvets	6–4, 7–6, 7–6^{(7–4)}
Loss	12	V	Singles (decisive)	Belarus	Vladimir Voltchkov	5–7, 2–6, 4–6
▲5–0; 24–26 September 2004; Luzhniki Palace of Sports, Moscow, Russia; World Group play-offs; clay surface
Win	13	III	Doubles (with Marat Safin)	Thailand	Sonchat Ratiwatana / Sanchai Ratiwatana	6–2, 6–1, 6–4
Win	14	V	Singles	Thailand	Sanchai Ratiwatana	6–4, 6–2
▲4–1; 4–6 March 2005; Olympic Stadium, Moscow, Russia; World Group first round; carpet surface
Loss	15	I	Singles	Chile	Fernando González	6–7^{(4–7)}, 7–5, 3–6, 6–7^{(4–7)}
Win	16	III	Doubles (with Marat Safin)	Chile	Fernando González / Adrián García	6–3, 6–4, 6–3
▲4–1; 15–17 July 2005; Olympic Stadium, Moscow, Russia; World Group quarterfinals; clay surface
Loss	17	III	Doubles (with Igor Andreev)	France	Michaël Llodra / Arnaud Clément	5–7, 4–6, 7–6^{(7–3)}, 2–6
▼2–3; 23–25 September 2005; Dvorana SC Gripe, Split, Croatia; World Group semifinal; carpet surface
Loss	18	II	Singles	Croatia	Ivan Ljubičić	6–3, 3–6, 4–6, 6–4, 6–4
▲5–0; 10–12 February 2006; Amsterdam RAI, Amsterdam, Netherlands; World Group first round; carpet surface
Win	19	III	Doubles (with Igor Andreev)	Netherlands	Raemon Sluiter / Jesse Huta Galung	6–3, 4–6, 6–4, 6–4
▲4–1; 7–9 April 2006; Palais des Sports, Pau, France; World Group quarterfinal; hard surface
Loss	20	III	Doubles (with Dmitry Tursunov)	France	Michaël Llodra / Arnaud Clément	3–6, 3–6, 7–6^{(7–3)}, 7–5, 2–6
Win	21	V	Singles (dead rubber)	France	Michaël Llodra	6–2, 4–6, 7–6^{(7–3)}
▲3–2; 22–24 September 2006; Olympic Stadium, Moscow, Russia; World Group semifinal; clay surface
Win	22	II	Singles	United States	James Blake	7–5, 1–6, 6–1, 7–5
Loss	23	III	Doubles (with Dmitry Tursunov)	United States	Bob Bryan / Mike Bryan	3–6, 4–6, 2–6
▲3–2; 6–8 April 2007; Small Palace Luzhniki, Moscow, Russia; World Group quarterfinal; carpet surface
Win	24	II	Singles	France	Richard Gasquet	6–2, 6–3, 6–7^{(8–10)}, 5–7, 8–6
▲3–2; 21–23 September 2007; Olympic Stadium, Moscow, Russia; World Group semifinal; clay surface
Loss	25	III	Doubles (with Dmitry Tursunov)	Germany	Philipp Petzschner / Alexander Waske	3–6, 6–3, 6–7^{(4–7)}, 6–7^{(5–7)}
Win	26	IV	Singles (decisive)	Germany	Philipp Petzschner	6–4, 6–4, 3–6, 6–3
▼1–4; 30 November – 2 December 2007; Veterans Memorial Coliseum, Portland, Oregon, United States; World Group final; hard surface
Loss	27	II	Singles	United States	James Blake	3–6, 6–7^{(4–7)}, 7–6^{(7–3)}, 6–7^{(3–7)}
▲3–2; 8–10 February 2008; Small Palace Luzhniki, Moscow, Russia; World Group first round; hard surface
Win	28	I	Singles	Serbia	Nenad Zimonjić	2–6, 6–3, 6–2, 6–4
Loss	29	III	Doubles (with Dmitry Tursunov)	Serbia	Novak Djokovic / Nenad Zimonjić	3–6, 6–7^{(6–8)}, 6–7^{(5–7)}
▲4–1; 6–8 March 2009; Sala Transilvania, Sibiu, Romania; World Group first round; carpet surface
Win	30	II	Singles	Romania	Victor Hănescu	6–4, 6–2, 6–4
▼1–4; 10–12 July 2009; Yad Eliyahu Arena, Tel Aviv, Israel; World Group quarterfinal; hard surface
Loss	31	II	Singles	Israel	Dudi Sela	6–3, 1–6, 0–6, 5–7
▲3–2; 5–7 March 2010; Small Palace Luzhniki, Moscow, Russia; World Group first round; hard surface
Win	32	II	Singles	India	Rohan Bopanna	6–4, 6–2, 6–3
Win	33	IV	Singles (decisive)	India	Somdev Devvarman	6–2, 6–1, 6–3
▼2–3; 9–11 July 2010; Olympic Stadium, Moscow, Russia; World Group quarterfinal; hard surface
Win	34	II	Singles	Argentina	Leonardo Mayer	6–3, 6–1, 6–4
Loss	35	V	Singles (decisive)	Argentina	David Nalbandian	6–7^{(5–7)} 4–6, 3–6
▲3–2; 16–18 September 2011; Kazan Tennis Academy, Kazan, Russia; World Group play-offs; hard surface
Win	36	I	Singles	Brazil	Ricardo Mello	6–0, 6–2, 6–1
Win	37	IV	Singles (decisive)	Brazil	Thomaz Bellucci	2–6, 6–3, 5–7, 6–4, 14–12
▼2–3; 10–12 February 2012; Arena Nova, Wiener Neustadt, Austria; World Group first round; hard surface
Win	38	III	Doubles (with Nikolay Davydenko)	Austria	Oliver Marach / Alexander Peya	7–6^{(7–1)}, 6–7^{(7–9)}, 7–5, 3–6, 6–4

=== Summer Olympics matches ===
==== Singles (5 wins, 3 losses) ====
Result	No.	Yr	Opponent	Surface	Rd	Score
Win	1	2004	(Belgium) Xavier Malisse (BEL)	Hard	1R	6–2, 6–2
Win	2	2004	(Czech Republic) Jiří Novák (CZE)	Hard	2R	6–4, 6–3
Win	3	2004	(Germany) Nicolas Kiefer (GER)	Hard	3R	6–3, 2–6, 6–2
Loss	1	2004	(United States) Mardy Fish (USA)	Hard	QF	3–6, 4–6
Win	4	2008	(Czech Republic) Jiří Vaněk (CZE)	Hard	1R	6–4, 6–1
Win	5	2008	(Sweden) Thomas Johansson (SWE)	Hard	2R	7–5, 6–2
Loss	2	2008	(Serbia) Novak Djokovic (SRB)	Hard	3R	6–7^{(3–7)}, 3–6
Loss	3	2012	(France) Julien Benneteau (FRA)	Grass	1R	5–7, 3–6

==== Doubles (2 wins, 3 losses) ====
Result	No.	Year	Partner	Opponent	Country	Surface	Rd	Score
Loss	1	2004	Marat Safin	Bob Bryan; Mike Bryan	United States	Hard	1R	1–6, 2–6
Win	1	2008	Dmitry Tursunov	Fernando González; Nicolás Massú	Chile	Hard	1R	7–6^{(7–5)}, 6–4
Loss	2	2008	Dmitry Tursunov	Roger Federer; Stanislas Wawrinka	Switzerland	Hard	2R	4–6, 3–6
Win	2	2012	Nikolay Davydenko	Christopher Kas; Philipp Petzschner	Germany	Grass	1R	7–5, 7–5
Loss	3	2012	Nikolay Davydenko	Bob Bryan; Mike Bryan	United States	Grass	2R	6–7^{(6–8)}, 6–7^{(1–7)}
