= 2009 ABN AMRO World Tennis Tournament – Wheelchair singles =

Wheelchair singles
- 2009 ABN AMRO World Tennis Tournament

Final
- Champion: (Netherlands) Robin Ammerlaan
- Runner-up: (France) Stéphane Houdet
- Score: 6–3, 6–7 (1), 6–3

Events
singles	doubles
wheelchair singles	wheelchair doubles
← 2008 ·	ABN AMRO World Tennis Tournament	· 2010 →

In the 2009 ABN AMRO World Tennis Tournament – Wheelchair singles event, the top two seeds Robin Ammerlaan and Stéphane Houdet met in the final. Ammerlaan won the first tournament with a three set win to seal the championship.

== Seeds ==
1. (Netherlands) Robin Ammerlaan (champion)
2. (France) Stéphane Houdet (final)

== Draw ==
=== Key ===
- Q = Qualifier
- WC = Wild card
- LL = Lucky loser
- Alt = Alternate
- SE = Special exempt
- PR = Protected ranking
- ITF = ITF entry
- JE = Junior exempt
- w/o = Walkover
- r = Retired
- d = Defaulted
- SR = Special ranking

=== Finals ===
Quarterfinals
1	(Netherlands) Robin Ammerlaan	6	6
(Poland) Tadeusz Kruszelnicki	0	0
(Sweden) Stefan Olsson	5	6	5
(Netherlands) Maikel Scheffers	7	3	7
(Austria) Martin Legner	3	7^{10}	6
(France) Nicolas Peifer	6	6^{8}	0
(Netherlands) Ronald Vink	1	2
2	(France) Stéphane Houdet	6	6

Semifinals
1	(Netherlands) Robin Ammerlaan	7	4	6
(Netherlands) Maikel Scheffers	5	6	1
(Austria) Martin Legner	3	2
2	(France) Stéphane Houdet	7	6

Final
1	(Netherlands) Robin Ammerlaan	6	6^{1}	6
2	(France) Stéphane Houdet	3	7^{7}	3
