= 2011 ABN AMRO World Tennis Tournament – Singles qualifying =

This article displays the qualifying draw of the 2011 ABN AMRO World Tennis Tournament.

== Players ==
=== Seeds ===
1. (Germany) Philipp Petzschner (qualifying competition, lucky loser)
2. (France) Julien Benneteau (qualifying competition)
3. (Germany) Mischa Zverev (qualifier)
4. (Bulgaria) Grigor Dimitrov (qualifier)
5. (Turkey) Marsel İlhan (first round)
6. (Kazakhstan) Yuri Schukin (first round)
7. (Netherlands) Igor Sijsling (first round)
8. (France) Benoît Paire (qualifier)

=== Qualifiers ===
1. (Russia) Dmitry Tursunov
2. (France) Benoît Paire
3. (Germany) Mischa Zverev
4. (Bulgaria) Grigor Dimitrov

=== Lucky losers ===
1. (Germany) Philipp Petzschner

== Qualifying draw ==
=== First qualifier ===
First round
1	(Germany) Philipp Petzschner	6	6
WC	(Netherlands) Jannick Lupescu	0	2
(Russia) Dmitry Tursunov	6	7
7	(Netherlands) Igor Sijsling	3	6^{3}

Qualifying competition
1	(Germany) Philipp Petzschner	5	6	3
(Russia) Dmitry Tursunov	7	4	6

=== Second qualifier ===
First round
2	(France) Julien Benneteau	6^{3}	6	6
(Switzerland) Stéphane Bohli	7	3	2
(Netherlands) Matwé Middelkoop	4	4
8	(France) Benoît Paire	6	6

Qualifying competition
2	(France) Julien Benneteau	6	3	4
8	(France) Benoît Paire	4	6	6

=== Third qualifier ===
First round
3	(Germany) Mischa Zverev	6	6
WC	(Finland) Micke Kontinen	1	3
(Ukraine) Sergei Bubka	6	6
6	(Kazakhstan) Yuri Schukin	3	4

Qualifying competition
3	(Germany) Mischa Zverev	7	6
(Ukraine) Sergei Bubka	6^{5}	2

=== Fourth qualifier ===
First round
4	(Bulgaria) Grigor Dimitrov	6	6
WC	(Netherlands) David de Goede	1	2
(Kazakhstan) Evgeny Korolev	7	4	6
5	(Turkey) Marsel İlhan	6^{3}	6	4

Qualifying competition
4	(Bulgaria) Grigor Dimitrov	6	6
(Kazakhstan) Evgeny Korolev	4	2
