= 2010 ABN AMRO World Tennis Tournament – Doubles =

Doubles
- 2010 ABN AMRO World Tennis Tournament

Final
- Champions: (Canada) Daniel Nestor (Serbia) Nenad Zimonjić
- Runners-up: (Sweden) Simon Aspelin (Australia) Paul Hanley
- Score: 6–4, 4–6, [10–7]

Events
singles	doubles
wheelchair singles	wheelchair doubles
← 2009 ·	ABN AMRO World Tennis Tournament	· 2011 →

Daniel Nestor and Nenad Zimonjić were the defending champions and managed to defend their title, after winning 6–4, 4–6, [10–7] in the final against Simon Aspelin and Paul Hanley.

== Seeds ==
1. (Canada) Daniel Nestor / (Serbia) Nenad Zimonjić (champions)
2. (Czech Republic) František Čermák / (Slovakia) Michal Mertiňák (semifinals)
3. (Poland) Mariusz Fyrstenberg / (Poland) Marcin Matkowski (quarterfinals)
4. (Germany) Christopher Kas / (Belgium) Dick Norman (quarterfinals)

== Draw ==
=== Key ===
- Q = Qualifier
- WC = Wild card
- LL = Lucky loser
- Alt = Alternate
- SE = Special exempt
- PR = Protected ranking
- ITF = ITF entry
- JE = Junior exempt
- w/o = Walkover
- r = Retired
- d = Defaulted
- SR = Special ranking

=== Draw ===
First round
1	(Canada) D Nestor (Serbia) N Zimonjić	7	6
(Serbia) J Tipsarević (Serbia) V Troicki	6^{1}	1
(Spain) F López (Spain) T Robredo	6	7
(Czech Republic) M Damm (Slovakia) F Polášek	4	6^{3}
3	(Poland) M Fyrstenberg (Poland) M Matkowski	7	3	[10]
(Switzerland) M Chiudinelli (Spain) G García-López	5	6	[7]
(South Africa) R de Voest (Netherlands) R Wassen	6	6^{7}	[8]
(Austria) J Knowle (Sweden) R Lindstedt	4	7	[10]
(Sweden) S Aspelin (Australia) P Hanley	6	6
ALT	(Italy) S Bolelli (Italy) A Seppi	2	3
(Croatia) L Ljubičić (Austria) J Melzer	1	6^{2}
4	(Germany) C Kas (Belgium) D Norman	6	7
(France) M Llodra (Israel) A Ram	6^{0}	6	[10]
(France) J Benneteau (France) A Clément	7	4	[4]
WC	(Netherlands) J Huta Galung (Netherlands) I Sijsling	3	2
2	(Czech Republic) F Čermák (Slovakia) M Mertiňák	6	6

Quarterfinals
1	(Canada) D Nestor (Serbia) N Zimonjić	6	6
(Spain) F López (Spain) T Robredo	3	4
3	(Poland) M Fyrstenberg (Poland) M Matkowski	3	6	[8]
(Austria) J Knowle (Sweden) R Lindstedt	6	4	[10]
(Sweden) S Aspelin (Australia) P Hanley	6	7
4	(Germany) C Kas (Belgium) D Norman	2	6^{4}
(France) M Llodra (Israel) A Ram	4	6^{6}
2	(Czech Republic) F Čermák (Slovakia) M Mertiňák	6	7

Semifinals
1	(Canada) D Nestor (Serbia) N Zimonjić	7	7
(Austria) J Knowle (Sweden) R Lindstedt	5	6^{6}
(Sweden) S Aspelin (Australia) P Hanley	3	6	[10]
2	(Czech Republic) F Čermák (Slovakia) M Mertiňák	6	3	[8]

Finals
1	(Canada) D Nestor (Serbia) N Zimonjić	6	4	[10]
(Sweden) S Aspelin (Australia) P Hanley	4	6	[7]
