= 2009 Aegon Championships =

- Date: 8–14 June
- Edition: 107th
- Category: ATP World Tour 250
- Draw: 56S / 24D
- Prize money: €663,750
- Surface: Grass / outdoor
- Location: London, United Kingdom
- Venue: Queen's Club

Champions

Singles
- (United Kingdom) Andy Murray

Doubles
- (South Africa) Wesley Moodie / (Russia) Mikhail Youzhny
- Queen's Club Championships

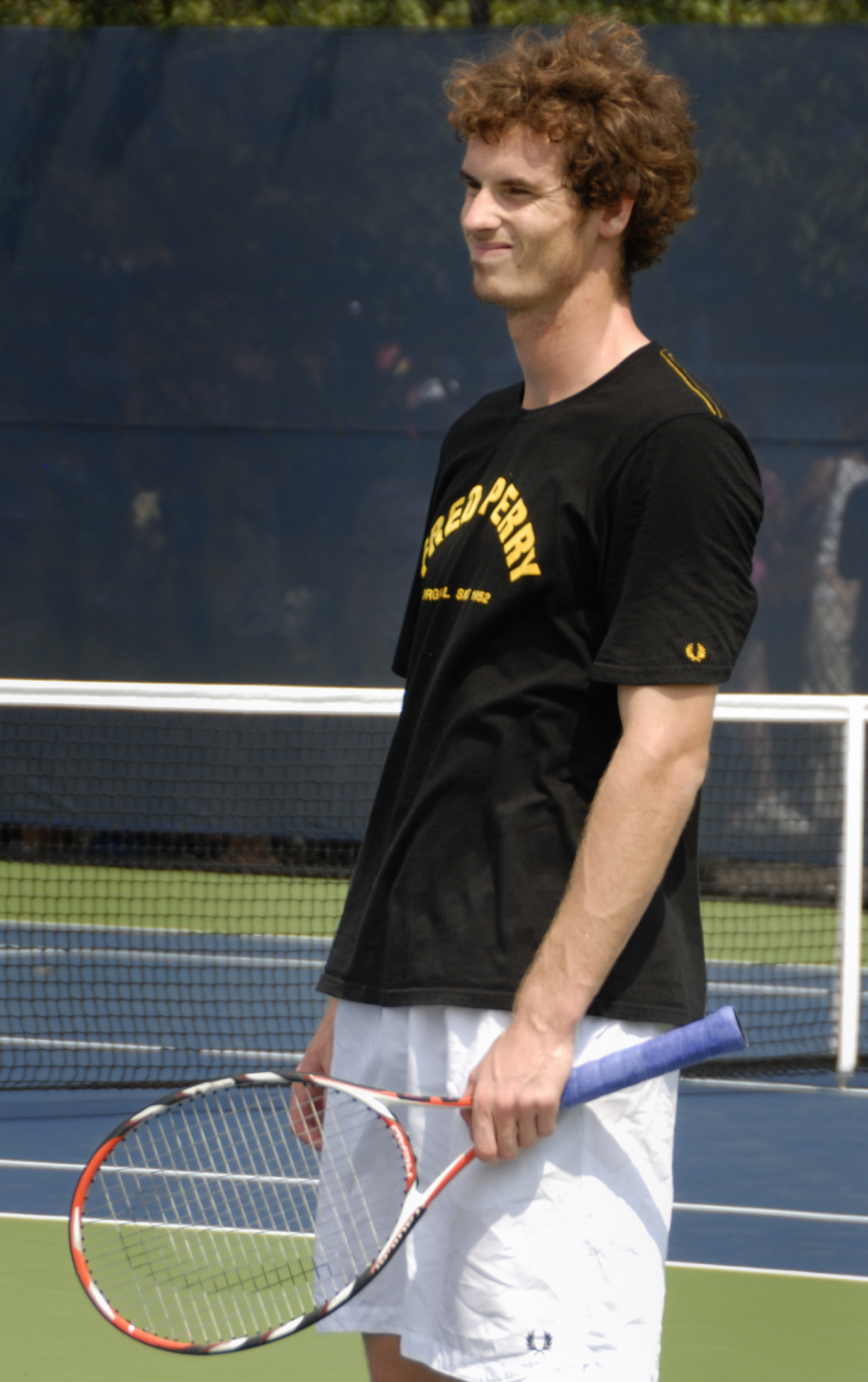
Andy Murray, the first Briton to win the tournament since Bunny Austin in 1938

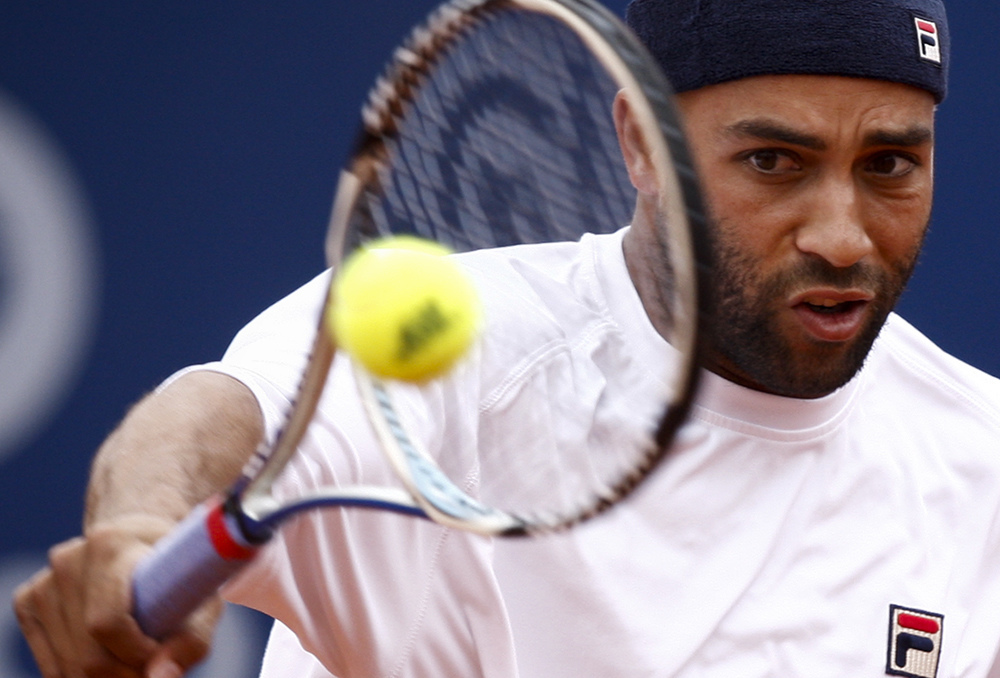
American James Blake finished runner-up in London for the second time after 2006

The 2009 Aegon Championships (also known traditionally as the Queen's Club Championships) was a tennis tournament played on outdoor grass courts. It was the 107th edition of the event and was part of the ATP World Tour 250 series of the 2009 ATP World Tour. It took place at the Queen's Club in London, United Kingdom, from 8–14 June 2009.

The singles draw was headlined by Association of Tennis Professionals (ATP) World Tour Number 3, US Open and Indian Wells runner-up, Doha, Rotterdam and Miami champion Andy Murray, Memphis winner, Australian Open semifinalist and four-time Queen's Club champion Andy Roddick, and Australian Open quarterfinalist Gilles Simon. Also present were Acapulco runner-up, French Open quarterfinalist Gaël Monfils, Chennai and Zagreb winner Marin Čilić, James Blake, Marat Safin and Mardy Fish.

The doubles draw was led by reigning Wimbledon champions, Rotterdam, Monte Carlo, Barcelona, Rome and Madrid winners Daniel Nestor and Nenad Zimonjić. Other seeded partnerships were 2008 US Open and 2009 Australian Open champions Bob Bryan and Mike Bryan, Bruno Soares and Kevin Ullyett, and Mariusz Fyrstenberg and Marcin Matkowski.

== Finals ==
=== Singles ===
(United Kingdom) Andy Murray defeated (United States) James Blake, 7–5, 6–4

- It was Murray's 4th title of the year and 12th of his career. It was his first of five Queen's Club Championships titles.

=== Doubles ===
(South Africa) Wesley Moodie / (Russia) Mikhail Youzhny defeated (Brazil) Marcelo Melo / (Brazil) André Sá, 6–4, 4–6, [10–6]

== Entrants ==
=== Seeds ===
	Nationality	Ranking*	Seeding
Andy Murray	(United Kingdom) Great Britain	3	1
Andy Roddick	United States	6	2
Gilles Simon	France	7	3
Gaël Monfils	France	10	4
Marin Čilić	Croatia	13	5
James Blake	United States	16	6
Marat Safin	Russia	22	7
Mardy Fish	United States	24	8
Ivo Karlović	Croatia	28	9
Feliciano López	Spain	30	10
Paul-Henri Mathieu	France	35	11
Jérémy Chardy	France	39	12
Ernests Gulbis	Latvia	40	13
Mikhail Youzhny	Russia	42	14
Lleyton Hewitt	Australia	48	15
Guillermo García López	Spain	50	16

* Seedings are based on the rankings as of 25 May 2009

=== Other entrants ===
The following players received wildcards into the main draw:

- (United Kingdom) Joshua Goodall
- (France) Sébastien Grosjean
- (United Kingdom) James Ward
- (Cyprus) Marcos Baghdatis
- (Bulgaria) Grigor Dimitrov

The following players received entry from the qualifying draw:

- (South Africa) Kevin Anderson
- (Belgium) Xavier Malisse
- (France) Nicolas Mahut
- (Ukraine) Sergiy Stakhovsky
