= 2011 ABN AMRO World Tennis Tournament – Wheelchair doubles =

Wheelchair doubles
- 2011 ABN AMRO World Tennis Tournament

Events
singles	doubles
wheelchair singles	wheelchair doubles
← 2010 ·	ABN AMRO World Tennis Tournament	· 2012 →

This was the first year of the Wheelchair doubles. The tournament was played in a round robin format and Robin Ammerlaan and Stéphane Houdet won the league.

== Draw ==
=== Key ===
- Q = Qualifier
- WC = Wild card
- LL = Lucky loser
- Alt = Alternate
- SE = Special exempt
- PR = Protected ranking
- ITF = ITF entry
- JE = Junior exempt
- w/o = Walkover
- r = Retired
- d = Defaulted
- SR = Special ranking

=== Standings ===
		(Netherlands) Ammerlaan (France) Houdet	(Netherlands) Scheffers (Netherlands) Vink	(France) Cattanéo (France) Peifer	(Austria) Legner (Sweden) Olsson	RR W–L	Set W–L	Game W–L	Standings
1	(Netherlands) Robin Ammerlaan (France) Stéphane Houdet		7-5, 2-6, 6-3	6–4, 6–3	6–7 (4–7), 6–4, 6–1	3–0	6–2		1
2	(Netherlands) Maikel Scheffers (Netherlands) Ronald Vink	5-7, 6-2, 3-6		6–2, 6–4	Walk over	2-1	3–2		2
3	(France) Frédéric Cattanéo (France) Nicolas Peifer	4–6, 3–6	2–6, 4–6			0–2	0–4		3
4	(Austria) Martin Legner (Sweden) Stefan Olsson	7–6 (7–4), 4–6, 1–6				0–1	1–2	12–18	4

Standings are determined by: 1. number of wins; 2. number of matches; 3. in two-players-ties, head-to-head records; 4. in three-players-ties, percentage of sets won, or of games won; 5. steering-committee decision.
