= 2011 ABN AMRO World Tennis Tournament – Doubles =

Doubles
- 2011 ABN AMRO World Tennis Tournament

Final
- Champions: (Austria) Jürgen Melzer; (Germany) Philipp Petzschner
- Runners-up: (France) Michaël Llodra; (Serbia) Nenad Zimonjić
- Score: 6–4, 3–6, [10–5]

Events
singles	doubles
wheelchair singles	wheelchair doubles
← 2010 ·	ABN AMRO World Tennis Tournament	· 2012 →

Daniel Nestor and Nenad Zimonjić were the defending champions, but Nestor chose not to participate that year.
Zimonjić played with Michaël Llodra and reached the final, but lost to Jürgen Melzer and Philipp Petzschner, 6–4, 3–6, [10–5].

== Seeds ==
1. (Poland) Mariusz Fyrstenberg / (Poland) Marcin Matkowski (quarterfinals)
2. (Austria) Jürgen Melzer / (Germany) Philipp Petzschner (champions)
3. (India) Mahesh Bhupathi / (Spain) Marcel Granollers (quarterfinals)
4. (France) Michaël Llodra / (Serbia) Nenad Zimonjić (final)

== Draw ==
=== Key ===
- Q = Qualifier
- WC = Wild card
- LL = Lucky loser
- Alt = Alternate
- SE = Special exempt
- PR = Protected ranking
- ITF = ITF entry
- JE = Junior exempt
- w/o = Walkover
- r = Retired
- d = Defaulted
- SR = Special ranking

=== Draw ===
First round

Quarterfinals

Semifinals

Final

1
(Poland) M Fyrstenberg
(Poland) M Matkowski
6
6

WC
- (Netherlands) J Eltingh
- (Netherlands) P Haarhuis
3
2

1
- (Poland) M Fyrstenberg
- (Poland) M Matkowski
6^{3}
3

(Czech Republic) T Berdych
(Germany) P Kohlschreiber
7
3
[12]

(Czech Republic) T Berdych
(Germany) P Kohlschreiber
7
6

- (Ukraine) S Stakhovsky
- (Russia) M Youzhny
5
6
[10]

- (Czech Republic) T Berdych
- (Germany) P Kohlschreiber

4
(France) M Llodra
(Serbia) N Zimonjić
6
7

4
(France) M Llodra
(Serbia) N Zimonjić
w/o

- (India) R Bopanna
- (Pakistan) A-u-H Qureshi
4
6^{4}

4
(France) M Llodra
(Serbia) N Zimonjić
6
6^{5}
[10]

WC
(Netherlands) T de Bakker
(Netherlands) R Haase
6
7

WC
- (Netherlands) T de Bakker
- (Netherlands) R Haase
4
7
[5]

- (Spain) F López
- (Spain) M López
2
5

4
- (France) M Llodra
- (Serbia) N Zimonjić
4
6
[5]

- (France) J Benneteau
- (France) J-W Tsonga
3
3

2
(Austria) J Melzer
(Germany) P Petzschner
6
3
[10]

Alt
(United Kingdom) A Murray
(United Kingdom) J Murray
6
6

Alt
(United Kingdom) A Murray
(United Kingdom) J Murray
6
6

- (Austria) J Knowle
- (Romania) H Tecău
6^{4}
4

3
- (India) M Bhupathi
- (Spain) M Granollers
2
3

3
(India) M Bhupathi
(Spain) M Granollers
7
6

Alt
- (United Kingdom) A Murray
- (United Kingdom) J Murray
4
4

- (Kazakhstan) A Golubev
- (Croatia) I Ljubičić
3
7
[4]

2
(Austria) J Melzer
(Germany) P Petzschner
6
6

(Sweden) S Aspelin
(Belgium) D Norman
6
5
[10]

- (Sweden) S Aspelin
- (Belgium) D Norman
2
2

- (Czech Republic) L Dlouhý
- (Australia) P Hanley
6^{3}
7
[4]

2
(Austria) J Melzer
(Germany) P Petzschner
6
6

2
(Austria) J Melzer
(Germany) P Petzschner
7
6^{4}
[10]
