= 2011 ABN AMRO World Tennis Tournament – Wheelchair singles =

Wheelchair singles
- 2011 ABN AMRO World Tennis Tournament

Final
- Champion: (Netherlands) Ronald Vink
- Runner-up: (France) Stéphane Houdet
- Score: 7–5, 6–1

Events
singles	doubles
wheelchair singles	wheelchair doubles
← 2010 ·	ABN AMRO World Tennis Tournament	· 2012 →

Stéphane Houdet was the defending champion, and he reached the final, losing to Dutchman Ronald Vink in straight sets. Many of his fans were disappointed in his performance but nonetheless he continued on to congratulate his opponent on his victory.

== Seeds ==
1. (France) Stéphane Houdet (finalist)
2. (Sweden) Stefan Olsson (first round)

== Draw ==
=== Key ===
- Q = Qualifier
- WC = Wild card
- LL = Lucky loser
- Alt = Alternate
- SE = Special exempt
- PR = Protected ranking
- ITF = ITF entry
- JE = Junior exempt
- w/o = Walkover
- r = Retired
- d = Defaulted
- SR = Special ranking

Quarterfinals
1	(France) Stéphane Houdet	6	6
(France) Nicolas Peifer	4	0
(Netherlands) Maikel Scheffers	6	6
(France) Frédéric Cattanéo	2	3
(Austria) Martin Legner	5	7	2
(Netherlands) Robin Ammerlaan	7	5	6
(Netherlands) Ronald Vink	6	7^{7}
2	(Sweden) Stefan Olsson	3	6^{0}

Semifinals
1	(France) Stéphane Houdet	6^{5}	6	6
(Netherlands) Maikel Scheffers	7^{7}	1	2
(Netherlands) Robin Ammerlaan	3	0r
(Netherlands) Ronald Vink	6	3

Final
1	(France) Stéphane Houdet	5	1
(Netherlands) Ronald Vink	7	6
