= 2011 ABN AMRO World Tennis Tournament – Singles =

Singles
- 2011 ABN AMRO World Tennis Tournament

Final
- Champion: (Sweden) Robin Söderling
- Runner-up: (France) Jo-Wilfried Tsonga
- Score: 6–3, 3–6, 6–3

Details
- Draw: 32 (4 Q / 3 WC )
- Seeds: 8

Events
singles	doubles
wheelchair singles	wheelchair doubles
- ABN AMRO World Tennis Tournament

Robin Söderling successfully defended his title, by defeating Jo-Wilfried Tsonga, 6–3, 3–6, 6–3, in the final.

== Seeds ==
1. (Sweden) Robin Söderling (champion)
2. (United Kingdom) Andy Murray (first round)
3. (Spain) David Ferrer (first round)
4. (Czech Republic) Tomáš Berdych (quarterfinals, withdrew because of illness)
5. (Austria) Jürgen Melzer (second round)
6. (Russia) Mikhail Youzhny (quarterfinals)
7. (Croatia) Ivan Ljubičić (semifinals)
8. (France) Jo-Wilfried Tsonga (final)

== Draw ==
Key

- Q = Qualifier
- WC = Wild card
- LL = Lucky loser
- Alt = Alternate
- ITF = ITF entry
- PR = Protected ranking
- SR = Special ranking
- SE = Special exempt
- JE = Junior exempt
- JR = Junior Accelerator Programme entrant
- CO = College Accelerator Programme entrant
- NG = Next Gen Accelerator Program entrant
- w/o = Walkover
- r = Retired
- d = Defaulted

=== Finals ===
Semifinals
1	(Sweden) Robin Söderling	7	6
(Serbia) Viktor Troicki	5	4
8	(France) Jo-Wilfried Tsonga	6	7
7	(Croatia) Ivan Ljubičić	4	6^{6}

Final
1	(Sweden) Robin Söderling	6	3	6
8	(France) Jo-Wilfried Tsonga	3	6	3

=== Top half ===
First round
1	(Sweden) R Söderling	6	6
WC	(Netherlands) R Haase	3	2
(Germany) P Kohlschreiber	6	7
(Chinese Taipei) Y-h Lu	4	6^{5}
LL	(Germany) P Petzschner	4	6	1
(Netherlands) T de Bakker	6	0	6
(Spain) M Granollers	2	6^{6}
6	(Russia) M Youzhny	6	7
3	(Spain) D Ferrer	3	4
(Finland) J Nieminen	6	6
(Serbia) V Troicki	6	7
WC	(Netherlands) T Schoorel	2	6^{1}
(Croatia) M Čilić	6	6
Q	(Germany) M Zverev	2	4
WC	(Netherlands) J Huta Galung	4	4
5	(Austria) J Melzer	6	6

Second round
1	(Sweden) R Söderling	6	5	7
(Germany) P Kohlschreiber	3	7	6^{7}
(Netherlands) T de Bakker	4	4
6	(Russia) M Youzhny	6	6
(Finland) J Nieminen	6^{4}	5
(Serbia) V Troicki	7	7
(Croatia) M Čilić	6	6
5	(Austria) J Melzer	2	4

Quarterfinals
1	(Sweden) R Söderling	6	7
6	(Russia) M Youzhny	4	6^{5}
(Serbia) V Troicki	7	6
(Croatia) M Čilić	5	3

Semifinals
1	(Sweden) R Söderling	7	6
(Serbia) V Troicki	5	4

=== Bottom half ===
First round
8	(France) J-W Tsonga	6	6
Q	(Bulgaria) G Dimitrov	4	4
(Russia) N Davydenko	3	6^{4}
(France) M Llodra	6	7
(Kazakhstan) A Golubev	4	5
Q	(Russia) D Tursunov	6	7
(Spain) G García López	1	2
4	(Czech Republic) T Berdych	6	6
7	(Croatia) I Ljubičić	7	6
(Ukraine) S Stakhovsky	6^{3}	3
Q	(France) B Paire	6	2	6
(France) G Simon	2	6	3
(Germany) F Mayer	3	4
(Spain) F López	6	6
(Cyprus) M Baghdatis	6	6
2	(United Kingdom) A Murray	4	1

Second round
8	(France) J-W Tsonga	4	6	6
(France) M Llodra	6	4	4
Q	(Russia) D Tursunov	4	6	5
4	(Czech Republic) T Berdych	6	4	7
7	(Croatia) I Ljubičić	6	6
Q	(France) B Paire	0	4
(Spain) F López	6^{1}	3
(Cyprus) M Baghdatis	7	6

Quarterfinals
8	(France) J-W Tsonga	w/o
4	(Czech Republic) T Berdych
7	(Croatia) I Ljubičić	6	6^{6}	7
(Cyprus) M Baghdatis	4	7	6^{4}

Semifinals
8	(France) J-W Tsonga	6	7
7	(Croatia) I Ljubičić	4	6^{6}
