= 2010 ABN AMRO World Tennis Tournament – Wheelchair singles =

Wheelchair singles
- 2010 ABN AMRO World Tennis Tournament

Final
- Champion: (France) Stéphane Houdet
- Runner-up: (Netherlands) Ronald Vink
- Score: 6–3, 6–3

Events
singles	doubles
wheelchair singles	wheelchair doubles
← 2009 ·	ABN AMRO World Tennis Tournament	· 2011 →

Robin Ammerlaan was the defending champion, but he lost in the first round to Stefan Olsson, who lost in the semifinals to the winner of the tournament Stéphane Houdet. Houdet beat Ronald Vink in straight sets for the championship.

== Seeds ==
1. (France) Stéphane Houdet (champion)
2. (Netherlands) Maikel Scheffers (semifinal)

== Draw ==
=== Key ===
- Q = Qualifier
- WC = Wild card
- LL = Lucky loser
- Alt = Alternate
- SE = Special exempt
- PR = Protected ranking
- ITF = ITF entry
- JE = Junior exempt
- w/o = Walkover
- r = Retired
- d = Defaulted
- SR = Special ranking

=== Finals ===
Quarterfinals
1	(France) Stéphane Houdet	6	6
(Austria) Martin Legner	0	0
(Netherlands) Robin Ammerlaan	4	2
(Sweden) Stefan Olsson	6	6
(France) Frédéric Cattanéo	6	2	0
(Netherlands) Ronald Vink	3	6	6
(France) Nicolas Peifer	2	4
2	(Netherlands) Maikel Scheffers	6	6

Semifinals
1	(France) Stéphane Houdet	6	6
(Sweden) Stefan Olsson	1	2
(Netherlands) Ronald Vink	6	6
2	(Netherlands) Maikel Scheffers	1	4

Final
1	(France) Stéphane Houdet	6	6
(Netherlands) Ronald Vink	3	3
