= 2010 ABN AMRO World Tennis Tournament =

- Date: 8–14 February
- Edition: 38th
- Category: ATP World Tour 500
- Draw: 32S / 16D
- Prize money: €1,150,000
- Surface: Hard court / indoor
- Location: Rotterdam, Netherlands
- Venue: Rotterdam Ahoy

Champions

Singles
- (Sweden) Robin Söderling

Doubles
- (Canada) Daniel Nestor / (Serbia) Nenad Zimonjić

Wheelchair singles
- (France) Stéphane Houdet
- ABN AMRO World Tennis Tournament

The 2010 ABN AMRO World Tennis Tournament was a men's tennis tournament played on indoor hard courts. It was the 38th edition of the event known as the ABN AMRO World Tennis Tournament, and was part of the ATP World Tour 500 series of the 2010 ATP World Tour. It took place at the Rotterdam Ahoy indoor sporting arena in Rotterdam, Netherlands, from 8 February through 14 February 2010. Third-seeded Robin Söderling won the singles title.

The field was led by newly crowned world no. 2 Novak Djokovic, world no. 6, 2010 Qatar ExxonMobil Open champion Nikolay Davydenko and 2009 French Open finalist Robin Söderling. Other players included Gaël Monfils, Tommy Robredo, Mikhail Youzhny and Ivan Ljubičić.

== Finals ==
=== Singles ===
(Sweden) Robin Söderling defeated (Russia) Mikhail Youzhny, 6–4, 2–0, ret.

- It was Söderling's first title of the year and 5th of his career.

=== Doubles ===
(Canada) Daniel Nestor / (Serbia) Nenad Zimonjić defeated (Sweden) Simon Aspelin / (Australia) Paul Hanley, 6–4, 4–6, [10–7]

== Entrants ==
=== Seeds ===
Country	Player	Rank^{1}	Seed
SRB	Novak Djokovic	2	1
RUS	Nikolay Davydenko	6	2
SWE	Robin Söderling	8	3
FRA	Gaël Monfils	13	4
ESP	Tommy Robredo	15	5
RUS	Mikhail Youzhny	20	6
CRO	Ivan Ljubičić	24	7
SRB	Viktor Troicki	31	8

- ^{1} Rankings as of February 1, 2010.

=== Other entrants ===
The following players received wildcards into the main draw:

- (Netherlands) Thiemo de Bakker
- (Netherlands) Robin Haase
- (Sweden) Robin Söderling

The following players received entry from the qualifying draw:

- (Switzerland) Stéphane Bohli
- (Kazakhstan) Andrey Golubev
- (Turkey) Marsel İlhan
- (Netherlands) Igor Sijsling

The following player received the lucky loser spot:

- (Czech Republic) Jan Hájek
