= 2009 Aegon Championships – Singles =

Singles
- 2009 Aegon Championships

Final
- Champion: (United Kingdom) Andy Murray
- Runner-up: (United States) James Blake
- Score: 7–5, 6–4

Details
- Draw: 56
- Seeds: 16

Events
Singles	Doubles
- Queen's Club Championships

Rafael Nadal was the defending champion, but chose not to participate due to a knee injury.

Andy Murray won in the final 7–5, 6–4, against James Blake, becoming the first British champion at Queen's since 1938.

== Seeds ==
The top eight seeds receive a bye into the second round.

1. (United Kingdom) Andy Murray (champion)
2. (United States) Andy Roddick (semifinals, retired due to an ankle injury)
3. (France) Gilles Simon (third round)
4. (France) Gaël Monfils (third round, withdrew due to a wrist injury)
5. (Croatia) Marin Čilić (second round)
6. (United States) James Blake (final)
7. (Russia) Marat Safin (withdrew due to a back injury)
8. (United States) Mardy Fish (quarterfinals)
9. (Croatia) Ivo Karlović (quarterfinals)
10. (Spain) Feliciano López (third round)
11. (France) Paul-Henri Mathieu (second round)
12. (France) Jérémy Chardy (first round)
13. (Latvia) Ernests Gulbis (first round)
14. (Russia) Mikhail Youzhny (quarterfinals)
15. (Australia) Lleyton Hewitt (third round)
16. (Spain) Guillermo García López (third round)

== Draw ==
Key

- Q = Qualifier
- WC = Wild card
- LL = Lucky loser
- Alt = Alternate
- ITF = ITF entry
- PR = Protected ranking
- SR = Special ranking
- SE = Special exempt
- JE = Junior exempt
- JR = Junior Accelerator Programme entrant
- CO = College Accelerator Programme entrant
- NG = Next Gen Accelerator Program entrant
- w/o = Walkover
- r = Retired
- d = Defaulted

=== Finals ===
Quarterfinals
1	(United Kingdom) Andy Murray	7	6
8	(United States) Mardy Fish	5	3
(Belgium) Steve Darcis	6	3	4
(Spain) Juan Carlos Ferrero	4	6	6
6	(United States) James Blake	7^{7}	6
14	(Russia) Mikhail Youzhny	6^{5}	3
9	(Croatia) Ivo Karlović	6^{4}	6^{5}
2	(United States) Andy Roddick	7^{7}	7^{7}

Semifinals
1	(United Kingdom) Andy Murray	6	6
(Spain) Juan Carlos Ferrero	2	4
6	(United States) James Blake	4
2	(United States) Andy Roddick	4^{r}

Final
1	(United Kingdom) Andy Murray	7	6
6	(United States) James Blake	5	4

=== Top half ===
==== Section 1 ====
First round
(Italy) A Seppi	5	7^{7}	6
(United States) R Ginepri	7	6^{4}	3
(Luxembourg) G Müller	6	7^{9}
WC	(United Kingdom) J Goodall	3	6^{7}
(Chinese Taipei) Y-h Lu	1	1
16	(Spain) G García López	6	6
10	(Spain) F López	7^{7}	7^{7}
(United States) R Kendrick	6^{3}	6^{3}
(Uzbekistan) D Istomin	3	6	6
(Czech Republic) I Minář	6	1	2
(France) M Llodra	6	6
(Russia) E Korolev	3	4

Second round
1	(United Kingdom) A Murray	6	6
(Italy) A Seppi	1	4
(Luxembourg) G Müller	6^{3}	3
16	(Spain) G García López	7^{7}	6
10	(Spain) F López	7^{7}	4	7^{7}
(Uzbekistan) D Istomin	6^{3}	6	6^{5}
(France) M Llodra	7	6^{5}	3
8	(United States) M Fish	5	7^{7}	6

Third round
1	(United Kingdom) A Murray	6	6
16	(Spain) G García López	4	4
10	(Spain) F López	1	4
8	(United States) M Fish	6	6

Quarterfinals
1	(United Kingdom) A Murray	7	6
8	(United States) M Fish	5	3

==== Section 2 ====
First round
(Kazakhstan) A Golubev	6	4	7^{7}
(United States) B Reynolds	2	6	6^{3}
(Belgium) S Darcis	3	6	6
(Chile) P Capdeville	6	3	4
(Spain) A Martín	7^{11}	6
13	(Latvia) E Gulbis	6^{9}	4
11	(France) P-H Mathieu	6	7^{8}
(Romania) A Pavel	4	6^{6}
WC	(France) S Grosjean	2	1^{r}
(Spain) JC Ferrero	6	2
Q	(Belgium) X Malisse	5
(Spain) P Andújar	0^{r}

Second round
4	(France) G Monfils	6	3	7^{7}
(Kazakhstan) A Golubev	3	6	6^{5}
(Belgium) S Darcis	6	6
(Spain) A Martín	2	4
11	(France) P-H Mathieu	4	4
(Spain) JC Ferrero	6	6
Q	(Belgium) X Malisse	7^{8}	7^{10}
LL	(South Africa) R de Voest	6^{6}	6^{8}

Third round
4	(France) G Monfils
(Belgium) S Darcis	w/o
(Spain) JC Ferrero	6	7^{7}
Q	(Belgium) X Malisse	4	6^{4}

Quarterfinals
(Belgium) S Darcis	6	3	4
(Spain) JC Ferrero	4	6	6

=== Bottom half ===
==== Section 3 ====
First round
(Croatia) I Ljubičić	4	6	6
Q	(Ukraine) S Stakhovsky	6	4	4
Q	(South Africa) K Anderson	6	7^{7}
(Italy) F Fognini	3	6^{3}
(United States) S Querrey	7^{12}	6
12	(France) J Chardy	6^{10}	4
14	(Russia) M Youzhny	6	6
(Spain) Ó Hernández	4	2
WC	(United Kingdom) J Ward	2	3
WC	(Cyprus) M Baghdatis	6	6
WC	(Bulgaria) G Dimitrov	6	4	6
(Spain) I Navarro	4	6	3

Second round
6	(United States) J Blake	6	7^{7}
(Croatia) I Ljubičić	2	6^{4}
Q	(South Africa) K Anderson	5	3
(United States) S Querrey	7	6
14	(Russia) M Youzhny	6	7^{7}
WC	(Cyprus) M Baghdatis	4	6^{3}
WC	(Bulgaria) G Dimitrov	6^{7}	6^{5}
3	(France) G Simon	7^{9}	7^{7}

Third round
6	(United States) J Blake	6	4	6
(United States) S Querrey	4	6	3
14	(Russia) M Youzhny	6	2	6
3	(France) G Simon	1	6	2

Quarterfinals
6	(United States) J Blake	7^{7}	6
14	(Russia) M Youzhny	6^{5}	3

==== Section 4 ====
First round
(Serbia) J Tipsarević	0	4
Q	(France) N Mahut	6	6
(France) J Benneteau	6	6
(Austria) D Köllerer	3	4
(Russia) T Gabashvili	3	6^{11}
9	(Croatia) I Karlović	6	7^{13}
15	(Australia) L Hewitt	6	6
(Argentina) E Schwank	1	0
(Portugal) F Gil	6	6
(Spain) D Gimeno Traver	1	3
(Argentina) L Mayer	6^{3}	4
(Belgium) K Vliegen	7^{7}	6

Second round
5	(Croatia) M Čilić	6^{1}	6^{5}
Q	(France) N Mahut	7^{7}	7^{7}
(France) J Benneteau	6^{7}	7^{7}	2
9	(Croatia) I Karlović	7^{9}	6^{4}	6
15	(Australia) L Hewitt	3	6	6
(Portugal) F Gil	6	2	2
(Belgium) K Vliegen	1	4
2	(United States) A Roddick	6	6

Third round
Q	(France) N Mahut	3	4
9	(Croatia) I Karlović	6	6
15	(Australia) L Hewitt	6^{2}	6^{4}
2	(United States) A Roddick	7^{7}	7^{7}

Quarterfinals
9	(Croatia) I Karlović	6^{4}	6^{5}
2	(United States) A Roddick	7^{7}	7^{7}
