= 2009 ABN AMRO World Tennis Tournament =

- Date: 9–15 February
- Edition: 37th
- Category: ATP World Tour 500
- Draw: 32S / 16D
- Prize money: €1,150,000
- Surface: Hard / indoor
- Location: Rotterdam, Netherlands
- Venue: Rotterdam Ahoy

Champions

Singles
- (United Kingdom) Andy Murray

Doubles
- (Canada) Daniel Nestor / (Serbia) Nenad Zimonjić

Wheelchair singles
- (Netherlands) Robin Ammerlaan
- ABN AMRO World Tennis Tournament

The 2009 ABN AMRO World Tennis Tournament was a men's tennis tournament played on indoor hard courts. It was the 37th edition of the event known as the ABN AMRO World Tennis Tournament, and is part of the ATP World Tour 500 series of the 2009 ATP World Tour. It took place at the Rotterdam Ahoy indoor sporting arena in Rotterdam, Netherlands, from 9 February through 15 February 2009. Second-seeded Andy Murray won the singles final beating first-seeded Rafael Nadal in the final.

== Players ==
The list of original seeded players was headlined by world number 1 Rafael Nadal, Andy Murray and Nikolay Davydenko. Also lined up are Gilles Simon, Gaël Monfils, David Ferrer, Jo-Wilfried Tsonga and Robin Söderling.

Robin Söderling was forced to withdraw from the tournament on the second day, before he was due to face Russia's Evgeny Korolev on day three. He was replaced by Frenchman Marc Gicquel who entered the tournament as a lucky loser.

== Finals ==
=== Singles ===
(United Kingdom) Andy Murray defeated (Spain) Rafael Nadal 6–3, 4–6, 6–0

- It was Murray's second title of the year and 10th of his career.

=== Doubles ===
(Canada) Daniel Nestor / (Serbia) Nenad Zimonjić defeated (Czech Republic) Lukáš Dlouhý / (India) Leander Paes 6–2, 7–5

== Seeds ==
Robin Söderling was the eighth seed, but had to withdraw.

Athlete	Nationality	Ranking*	Seeding
Rafael Nadal	Spain	1	1
Andy Murray	(United Kingdom) Great Britain	4	2
Nikolay Davydenko	Russia	5	3
Gilles Simon	France	8	4
Gaël Monfils	France	12	5
David Ferrer	Spain	14	6
Jo-Wilfried Tsonga	France	13	7
Robin Söderling	Sweden	16	8

- Rankings as of February 9, 2009.

=== Other entrants ===
The following players received wildcards into the main draw:

- (Bulgaria) Grigor Dimitrov
- (Netherlands) Jesse Huta Galung
- (Netherlands) Thiemo de Bakker

The following players received entry from the qualifying draw:

- (France) Arnaud Clément
- (Switzerland) Stéphane Bohli
- (France) Laurent Recouderc
- (Russia) Evgeny Korolev
- (France) Marc Gicquel (as a lucky loser)

== Events ==
=== Singles ===
In the first ATP World 500 Series tournament of the year, all the seeded players reached the second round. World number 1 Rafael Nadal needed three sets to beat Simone Bolelli and David Ferrer equally took three sets to advance against Jürgen Melzer. Thiemo de Bakker, who was ranked at #242 in the world rankings and one of only two Dutchmen in the competition, lost his first round tie against Andreas Seppi. The other home player, Jesse Huta Galung, gave seventh seed Jo Wilfried Tsonga a real game but lost out on two tie-breaks. Andy Murray beat former top three player Ivan Ljubičić while Gaël Monfils took the first set against Swiss player Stéphane Bohli before his opponent had to retire injured.

Seeds began to fall in the second round: Nikolay Davydenko, Gilles Simon and David Ferrer exited the competition with defeats to Julien Benneteau, Mario Ančić and Mikhail Youzhny respectively. Nadal overcame the loss of the second set against the 2008 junior champion Grigor Dimitrov to win 7–5, 3–6, 6–2. Murray defeated Seppi 7–6, 7–6 and Monfils beat fellow Frenchman Michaël Llodra. The quarter-final line-up was completed by Marc Gicquel (who had the opportunity to play after Soderling's withdrawal) and Tsonga who defeated Dmitry Tursunov.

In the quarter-finals Rafael Nadal beat Frenchman Tsonga 6–4, 7–6, 6–4 to set up a match with Monfils in the semi-finals, who beat Julien Benneteau 7–6, 6–1. Mario Ančić continued his good form from the Zagreb tournament the previous week by beating Mikhail Youzhny 6–4, 6–2 in their quarter-final match. Marc Gicquel was forced to retire from his quarter-final against Murray when Murray was leading 7–6, 4–6, 3–0.

In the first semi-final match, despite initial fears that he would not be able to play due to an ankle injury, Murray beat Ančić 6–1, 6–2.

=== Doubles ===
The #1, #2 and #4 seeded doubles pairs all progressed through the first two rounds to reach the semi-finals. Top seeds Daniel Nestor and Nenad Zimonjić recorded identical scorelines of 7–6(2), 6–4 in their opening two matches, defeating singles players Dmitry Tursunov (the champion the previous year with Tomáš Berdych) and Gilles Simon in the first round before beating Italians Andreas Seppi and Simone Bolelli. The #2 seeded pair of Lukáš Dlouhý and Leander Paes won on a final-set champions tiebreak against Christopher Kas and Philipp Kohlschreiber, then proceeded to win 6–2, 6–1 against Igor Andreev and Marcin Matkowski in the quarterfinals. The Julian Knowle and Andy Ram partnerships also reached the semi-finals after a straight sets victory over Andy Murray and James Auckland in the first round and victory over the French pair of Arnaud Clément and Michaël Llodra in the second round. The #3 pair of Jeff Coetzee – Wesley Moodie were defeated in the quarter-finals by Tomáš Berdych and Jürgen Melzer 4–6, 6^{6}-7.
