= 2011 ABN AMRO World Tennis Tournament =

- Date: 7–13 February
- Edition: 39th
- Category: ATP World Tour 500
- Draw: 32S / 16D
- Prize money: €1,150,000
- Surface: Hard / indoor
- Location: Rotterdam, Netherlands
- Venue: Rotterdam Ahoy

Champions

Singles
- (Sweden) Robin Söderling

Doubles
- (Austria) Jürgen Melzer / (Germany) Philipp Petzschner

Wheelchair singles
- (Netherlands) Ronald Vink

Wheelchair doubles
- (Netherlands) Robin Ammerlaan / (France) Stéphane Houdet
- ABN AMRO World Tennis Tournament

The 2011 ABN AMRO World Tennis Tournament was a men's tennis tournament played on indoor hard courts. It was the 38th edition of the event known as the ABN AMRO World Tennis Tournament, and was part of the ATP World Tour 500 series of the 2011 ATP World Tour. It took place at the Rotterdam Ahoy indoor sporting arena in Rotterdam, Netherlands, from February 7 through February 13, 2011. First-seeded Robin Söderling won his second successive singles title.

The field was led by Australian Open finalist Andy Murray, Australian Open semifinalist David Ferrer and defending champion Robin Söderling. Other players included World No. 10 Jürgen Melzer and former top 10 players Ivan Ljubičić, Tommy Robredo, and Mikhail Youzhny.

== Finals ==
=== Singles ===
(Sweden) Robin Söderling defeated (France) Jo-Wilfried Tsonga, 6–3, 3–6, 6–3.

- It was Soderling's second title of the year, eighth of his career, and his second consecutive win at the event.

=== Doubles ===
(Austria) Jürgen Melzer / (Germany) Philipp Petzschner defeated (France) Michaël Llodra / (Serbia) Nenad Zimonjić, 6–4, 3–6, [10–5].

=== Wheelchair singles ===
(Netherlands) Ronald Vink defeated (France) Stéphane Houdet, 7–5, 6–1

=== Wheelchair doubles ===
The tournament was played in a round robin format with (Netherlands) Robin Ammerlaan and (France) Stéphane Houdet won the league.

== Entrants ==
=== Seeds ===
Country	Player	Rank^{1}	Seed
SWE	Robin Söderling	4	1
GBR	Andy Murray	5	2
ESP	David Ferrer	6	3
CZE	Tomáš Berdych	7	4
AUT	Jürgen Melzer	10	5
RUS	Mikhail Youzhny	11	6
CRO	Ivan Ljubičić	15	7
FRA	Jo-Wilfried Tsonga	18	8

- ^{1} Rankings as of January 31, 2011.

=== Other entrants ===
The following players received wildcards into the main draw:

- (Netherlands) Robin Haase
- (Netherlands) Jesse Huta Galung
- (Netherlands) Thomas Schoorel

The following players received entry from the qualifying draw:

- (Bulgaria) Grigor Dimitrov
- (France) Benoît Paire
- (Russia) Dmitry Tursunov
- (Germany) Mischa Zverev

The following players received entry as a lucky loser into the singles main draw:

- (Germany) Philipp Petzschner
