= 2010 ABN AMRO World Tennis Tournament – Singles =

Singles
- 2010 ABN AMRO World Tennis Tournament

Final
- Champion: (Sweden) Robin Söderling
- Runner-up: (Russia) Mikhail Youzhny
- Score: 6–4, 2–0 retired

Details
- Draw: 32 (4 Q / 3 WC )
- Seeds: 8

Events
singles	doubles
wheelchair singles	wheelchair doubles
- ABN AMRO World Tennis Tournament

Andy Murray was the defending champion, but chose not to participate that year.
Robin Söderling won the final, leading 6–4, 2–0, after Mikhail Youzhny was forced to retire because of a right hamstring injury.

== Seeds ==
1. (Serbia) Novak Djokovic (semifinals)
2. (Russia) Nikolay Davydenko (semifinals)
3. (Sweden) Robin Söderling (champion)
4. (France) Gaël Monfils (quarterfinals)
5. (Spain) Tommy Robredo (second round)
6. (Russia) Mikhail Youzhny (final, retired because of a right hamstring injury)
7. (Croatia) Ivan Ljubičić (first round)
8. (Serbia) Viktor Troicki (first round, retired)

== Draw ==
Key

- Q = Qualifier
- WC = Wild card
- LL = Lucky loser
- Alt = Alternate
- ITF = ITF entry
- PR = Protected ranking
- SR = Special ranking
- SE = Special exempt
- JE = Junior exempt
- JR = Junior Accelerator Programme entrant
- CO = College Accelerator Programme entrant
- NG = Next Gen Accelerator Program entrant
- w/o = Walkover
- r = Retired
- d = Defaulted

=== Finals ===
Semifinals
1	(Serbia) Novak Djokovic	6^{5}	6^{6}
6	(Russia) Mikhail Youzhny	7	7
3	(Sweden) Robin Söderling	7	6
2	(Russia) Nikolay Davydenko	6^{3}	4

Final
6	(Russia) Mikhail Youzhny	4	0^{r}
3	(Sweden) Robin Söderling	6	2

=== Top half ===
First round
1	(Serbia) N Djokovic	6	4
(Ukraine) S Stakhovsky	2	1^{r}
(Switzerland) M Chiudinelli	6	6^{5}	7
(France) M Llodra	1	7	6^{6}
(Serbia) J Tipsarević	3	7	6^{6}
(Germany) F Mayer	6	6^{6}	7
WC	(Netherlands) R Haase	6^{4}	4
5	(Spain) T Robredo	7	6
4	(France) G Monfils	4	6	6
(Belgium) O Rochus	6	1	2
WC	(Netherlands) T de Bakker	7	6
LL	(Czech Republic) J Hájek	6^{5}	3
(Spain) G García-López	1	4
Q	(Turkey) M İlhan	6	6
Q	(Kazakhstan) A Golubev	6	6^{0}	6^{5}
6	(Russia) M Youzhny	1	7	7

Second round
1	(Serbia) N Djokovic	6	6
(Switzerland) M Chiudinelli	4	2
(Germany) F Mayer	6	3	6
5	(Spain) T Robredo	4	6	3
4	(France) G Monfils	6	6
WC	(Netherlands) T de Bakker	3	2
Q	(Turkey) M İlhan	4	4
6	(Russia) M Youzhny	6	6

Quarterfinals
1	(Serbia) N Djokovic	w/o
(Germany) F Mayer
4	(France) G Monfils	7	2	3
6	(Russia) M Youzhny	5	6	6

Semifinals
1	(Serbia) N Djokovic	6^{5}	6^{6}
6	(Russia) M Youzhny	7	7

=== Bottom half ===
First round
7	(Croatia) I Ljubičić	3	3
(France) J Benneteau	6	6
(Germany) M Berrer	7	4	6
(France) A Clément	6^{16}	6	4
(Germany) M Zverev	7	3	5
Q	(Netherlands) I Sijsling	6^{2}	6	7
(France) F Serra	6	4	1
3	(Sweden) R Söderling	4	6	6
8	(Serbia) V Troicki	3	0^{r}
(Austria) J Melzer	6	3
Q	(Switzerland) S Bohli	1	5
(Italy) A Seppi	6	7
(Cyprus) M Baghdatis	6	6
(United States) J Blake	4	2
(Spain) F López	4	2
2	(Russia) N Davydenko	6	6

Second round
(France) J Benneteau	6	6
(Germany) M Berrer	4	4
Q	(Netherlands) I Sijsling	6^{6}	2
3	(Sweden) R Söderling	7	6
(Austria) J Melzer	6	6
(Italy) A Seppi	2	2
(Cyprus) M Baghdatis	3	2
2	(Russia) N Davydenko	6	6

Quarterfinals
(France) J Benneteau	0	1
3	(Sweden) R Söderling	6	6
(Austria) J Melzer	3	2
2	(Russia) N Davydenko	6	6

Semifinals
3	(Sweden) R Söderling	7	6
2	(Russia) N Davydenko	6^{3}	4

== Qualifying ==
=== Seeds ===
1. (Czech Republic) Jan Hájek (qualifying competition)
2. (Belgium) Christophe Rochus (first round)
3. (Russia) Igor Kunitsyn (first round)
4. (Germany) Rainer Schüttler (first round)
5. (Kazakhstan) Andrey Golubev (qualified)
6. (Italy) Simone Bolelli (first round, retired)
7. (Spain) Ivan Navarro (first round)
8. (France) David Guez (first round)

=== Qualifiers ===
1. (Kazakhstan) Andrey Golubev
2. (Netherlands) Igor Sijsling
3. (Switzerland) Stéphane Bohli
4. (Turkey) Marsel İlhan

=== Lucky loser ===
1. (Czech Republic) Jan Hájek

== Qualifying draw ==
=== First qualifier ===
First round
1	(Czech Republic) Jan Hájek	6	6
(Andorra) Laurent Recouderc	4	4
WC	(Netherlands) Jannick Lupescu	1	1
5	(Kazakhstan) Andrey Golubev	6	6

Qualifying Round
1	(Czech Republic) Jan Hájek	6^{2}	7^{9}	2
5	(Kazakhstan) Andrey Golubev	7^{7}	6^{7}	6

=== Second qualifier ===
First round
2	(Belgium) Christophe Rochus	2	1
WC	(Netherlands) Igor Sijsling	6	6
WC	(Netherlands) Jesse Huta Galung	6	7^{11}
8	(France) David Guez	2	6^{9}

Qualifying Round
WC	(Netherlands) Igor Sijsling	6	6
WC	(Netherlands) Jesse Huta Galung	3	3

=== Third qualifier ===
First round
3	(Russia) Igor Kunitsyn	5	6^{5}
(Switzerland) Stéphane Bohli	7	7^{7}
Alt	(Netherlands) Raemon Sluiter	6	4
6	(Italy) Simone Bolelli	4	1^{r}

Qualifying Round
(Switzerland) Stéphane Bohli	5	7	6
Alt	(Netherlands) Raemon Sluiter	7	5	4

=== Fourth qualifier ===
First round
4	(Germany) Rainer Schüttler	2	4
(France) Édouard Roger-Vasselin	6	6
(Turkey) Marsel İlhan	6	6
7	(Spain) Ivan Navarro	2	2

Qualifying Round
(France) Édouard Roger-Vasselin	3	6	3
(Turkey) Marsel İlhan	6	1	6
