= 2007 BNP Paribas Masters – Singles =

Singles
- 2007 BNP Paribas Masters

Final
- Champion: (Argentina) David Nalbandian
- Runner-up: (Spain) Rafael Nadal
- Score: 6–4, 6–0

Details
- Draw: 48 (6Q / 3WC)
- Seeds: 16

Events
Singles	Doubles
- Paris Masters

David Nalbandian defeated Rafael Nadal in the final, 6–4, 6–0 to win the singles tennis title at the 2007 Paris Masters.

Nikolay Davydenko was the defending champion, but lost in the third round to Marcos Baghdatis.

== Seeds ==
All seeds received a bye into the second round.

1. (Switzerland) Roger Federer (third round)
2. (Spain) Rafael Nadal (final)
3. (Serbia) Novak Djokovic (second round)
4. (Russia) Nikolay Davydenko (third round)
5. (Spain) David Ferrer (quarterfinals)
6. (United States) James Blake (third round)
7. (Chile) Fernando González (second round)
8. (Spain) Tommy Robredo (quarterfinals)
9. (Germany) Tommy Haas (third round)
10. (France) Richard Gasquet (semifinals)
11. (Argentina) Guillermo Cañas (third round)
12. (Czech Republic) Tomáš Berdych (third round)
13. (Croatia) Ivan Ljubičić (second round)
14. (Spain) Carlos Moyá (second round)
15. (United Kingdom) Andy Murray (quarterfinals)
16. (Argentina) Juan Ignacio Chela (second round)

== Draw ==
Key

- Q = Qualifier
- WC = Wild card
- LL = Lucky loser
- Alt = Alternate
- ITF = ITF entry
- PR = Protected ranking
- SR = Special ranking
- SE = Special exempt
- JE = Junior exempt
- JR = Junior Accelerator Programme entrant
- CO = College Accelerator Programme entrant
- NG = Next Gen Accelerator Program entrant
- w/o = Walkover
- r = Retired
- d = Defaulted

=== Finals ===
Quarterfinals
(Argentina) David Nalbandian	7	6^{3}	6
5	(Spain) David Ferrer	6^{3}	7	2
15	(United Kingdom) Andy Murray	3	6	4
10	(France) Richard Gasquet	6	0	6
8	(Spain) Tommy Robredo	4	4
(Cyprus) Marcos Baghdatis	6	6
(Russia) Mikhail Youzhny	4	2
2	(Spain) Rafael Nadal	6	6

Semifinals
(Argentina) David Nalbandian	6	6
10	(France) Richard Gasquet	2	4
(Cyprus) Marcos Baghdatis	6	4	3
2	(Spain) Rafael Nadal	4	6	6

Final
(Argentina) David Nalbandian	6	6
2	(Spain) Rafael Nadal	4	0

=== Top half ===
==== Section 1 ====
First round
(Spain) F Verdasco	6	3	4
(Croatia) I Karlović	4	6	6
(Spain) N Almagro	4	4
(Argentina) D Nalbandian	6	6
(France) P-H Mathieu	6	2	3
(Croatia) M Ančić	4	6	6
(Russia) D Tursunov	6^{7}	4
(United States) M Fish	7	6

Second round
1	(Switzerland) R Federer	6	4	6
(Croatia) I Karlović	3	6	3
(Argentina) D Nalbandian	6	6
14	(Spain) C Moyá	4	4
12	(Czech Republic) T Berdych	6	6
(Croatia) M Ančić	3	3
(United States) M Fish	1	6^{4}
5	(Spain) D Ferrer	6	7

Third round
1	(Switzerland) R Federer	4	6^{3}
(Argentina) D Nalbandian	6	7
12	(Czech Republic) T Berdych	4	2
5	(Spain) D Ferrer	6	6

Quarterfinals
(Argentina) D Nalbandian	7	6^{3}	6
5	(Spain) D Ferrer	6^{3}	7	2

==== Section 2 ====
First round
(France) F Santoro	7	6
(Spain) Montañés	6^{4}	2
(Finland) J Nieminen	6	6
(Argentina) J Mónaco	4	4
WC	(France) J-W Tsonga	6	3	6
WC	(France) S Grosjean	3	6	3
Q	(Russia) T Gabashvili	4	6^{4}
WC	(France) N Mahut	6	7

Second round
3	(Serbia) N Djokovic	3	2
(France) F Santoro	6	6
(Finland) J Nieminen	6^{5}	3
15	(United Kingdom) A Murray	7	6
10	(France) R Gasquet	7	7
WC	(France) J-W Tsonga	5	6^{3}
WC	(France) N Mahut	7	6^{4}	1
6	(United States) J Blake	6^{3}	7	6

Third round
(France) F Santoro	4	2
15	(United Kingdom) A Murray	6	6
10	(France) R Gasquet	6	6
6	(United States) J Blake	4	4

Quarterfinals
15	(United Kingdom) A Murray	3	6	4
10	(France) R Gasquet	6	0	6

=== Bottom half ===
==== Section 3 ====
First round
(Italy) P Starace	3	6	3
(France) G Simon	6	3	6
Q	(Italy) A Seppi	5	6	6
Q	(United States) S Querrey	7	1	3
(Spain) JC Ferrero	4	2
(Cyprus) M Baghdatis	6	6
Q	(Argentina) JM del Potro	6	6
(Spain) F López	4	3

Second round
8	(Spain) T Robredo	6	2	6
(France) G Simon	4	6	4
Q	(Italy) A Seppi	3	6^{5}
11	(Argentina) G Cañas	6	7
13	(Croatia) I Ljubičić	4	6^{4}
(Cyprus) M Baghdatis	6	7
Q	(Argentina) JM del Potro	6^{3}	1
4	(Russia) N Davydenko	7	6

Third round
8	(Spain) T Robredo	7	7
11	(Argentina) G Cañas	5	5
(Cyprus) M Baghdatis	6	6
4	(Russia) N Davydenko	2	2

Quarterfinals
8	(Spain) T Robredo	4	4
(Cyprus) M Baghdatis	6	6

==== Section 4 ====
First round
(France) A Clément	4	3
(Russia) M Youzhny	6	6
Q	(Serbia) J Tipsarević	7	7
Q	(United States) V Spadea	6^{9}	6^{2}
(Switzerland) S Wawrinka	7	6
(Germany) N Kiefer	5	3
(Austria) J Melzer	0	3
(Italy) F Volandri	6	6

Second round
7	(Chile) F González	6	3	3
(Russia) M Youzhny	3	6	6
Q	(Serbia) J Tipsarević	3	7	3
9	(Germany) T Haas	6	6^{5}	6
16	(Argentina) JI Chela	3	1
(Switzerland) S Wawrinka	6	6
(Italy) F Volandri	3	1
2	(Spain) R Nadal	6	6

Third round
(Russia) M Youzhny	6	1	6
9	(Germany) T Haas	4	6	3
(Switzerland) S Wawrinka	4	3
2	(Spain) R Nadal	6	6

Quarterfinals
(Russia) M Youzhny	4	2
2	(Spain) R Nadal	6	6

== Qualifying ==
=== Qualifying seeds ===
1. (Sweden) Thomas Johansson (qualifying competition)
2. (Argentina) Juan Martín del Potro (qualified)
3. (Belgium) Olivier Rochus (first round)
4. (Germany) Michael Berrer (first round)
5. (Italy) Andreas Seppi (qualified)
6. (Argentina) José Acasuso (qualifying competition)
7. (United States) Sam Querrey (qualified)
8. (Sweden) Jonas Björkman (first round)
9. (Serbia) Janko Tipsarević (qualified)
10. (Germany) Benjamin Becker (first round)
11. (United States) Vince Spadea (qualified)
12. (Chile) Nicolás Massú (qualifying competition)

=== Qualifiers ===
1. (United States) Vince Spadea
2. (Argentina) Juan Martín del Potro
3. (Serbia) Janko Tipsarević
4. (Russia) Teymuraz Gabashvili
5. (Italy) Andreas Seppi
6. (United States) Sam Querrey

=== Qualifying draw ===
==== First qualifier ====
First round
1	(Sweden) Thomas Johansson	6	4	6
(Italy) Simone Bolelli	3	6	4
(Spain) Iván Navarro	1	6^{6}
11	(United States) Vince Spadea	6	7^{8}

Qualifying competition
1	(Sweden) Thomas Johansson	6^{5}	2
11	(United States) Vince Spadea	7^{7}	6

==== Second qualifier ====
First round
2	(Argentina) Juan Martín del Potro	6	6
(Spain) Guillermo García López	3	4
(France) Édouard Roger-Vasselin	6	3	5
12	(Chile) Nicolás Massú	3	6	7

Qualifying competition
2	(Argentina) Juan Martín del Potro	6^{5}	7^{7}	6
12	(Chile) Nicolás Massú	7^{7}	6^{3}	3

==== Third qualifier ====
First round
3	(Belgium) Olivier Rochus	3	4
(Belgium) Kristof Vliegen	6	6
WC	(France) Jérôme Haehnel	6	3	6^{3}
9	(Serbia) Janko Tipsarević	3	6	7^{7}

Qualifying competition
(Belgium) Kristof Vliegen	4	7^{10}	4
9	(Serbia) Janko Tipsarević	6	6^{8}	6

==== Fourth qualifier ====
First round
4	(Germany) Michael Berrer	6	5	3
(Russia) Teymuraz Gabashvili	2	7	6
WC	(France) Josselin Ouanna	6	6
8	(Sweden) Jonas Björkman	2	2

Qualifying competition
(Russia) Teymuraz Gabashvili	6	6
WC	(France) Josselin Ouanna	2	1

==== Fifth qualifier ====
First round
5	(Italy) Andreas Seppi	6	7^{8}
(Belarus) Max Mirnyi	2	6^{6}
Alt	(Ecuador) Nicolás Lapentti	6	6
10	(Germany) Benjamin Becker	3	3

Qualifying competition
5	(Italy) Andreas Seppi	6	6
Alt	(Ecuador) Nicolás Lapentti	4	2

==== Sixth qualifier ====
First round
6	(Argentina) José Acasuso	6	6
WC	(France) Gary Lugassy	3	2
WC	(France) David Guez	4	6	5
7	(United States) Sam Querrey	6	4	7

Qualifying competition
6	(Argentina) José Acasuso	6^{7}	3
7	(United States) Sam Querrey	7^{9}	6
