= 2009 ABN AMRO World Tennis Tournament – Singles =

Singles
- 2009 ABN AMRO World Tennis Tournament

Final
- Champion: (United Kingdom) Andy Murray
- Runner-up: (Spain) Rafael Nadal
- Score: 6–3, 4–6, 6–0

Details
- Draw: 32 (4 Q / 3 WC )
- Seeds: 8

Events
Singles	Doubles
- ABN AMRO World Tennis Tournament

Michaël Llodra was the defending champion, but lost in the second round to Gaël Monfils.

Andy Murray defeated Rafael Nadal in the final, 6–3, 4–6, 6–0, to win the title.

== Seeds ==
1. (Spain) Rafael Nadal (final)
2. (United Kingdom) Andy Murray (champion)
3. (Russia) Nikolay Davydenko (second round)
4. (France) Gilles Simon (second round)
5. (France) Gaël Monfils (semifinals)
6. (Spain) David Ferrer (second round)
7. (France) Jo-Wilfried Tsonga (quarterfinals)
8. (Sweden) Robin Söderling (withdrew)

== Draw ==
Key

- Q = Qualifier
- WC = Wild card
- LL = Lucky loser
- Alt = Alternate
- ITF = ITF entry
- PR = Protected ranking
- SR = Special ranking
- SE = Special exempt
- JE = Junior exempt
- JR = Junior Accelerator Programme entrant
- CO = College Accelerator Programme entrant
- NG = Next Gen Accelerator Program entrant
- w/o = Walkover
- r = Retired
- d = Defaulted

=== Finals ===
Semifinals
1	(Spain) Rafael Nadal	6	6
5	(France) Gaël Monfils	4	4
(Croatia) Mario Ančić	1	2
2	(United Kingdom) Andy Murray	6	6

Final
1	(Spain) Rafael Nadal	3	6	0
2	(United Kingdom) Andy Murray	6	4	6

=== Top half ===
First round
1	(Spain) R Nadal	4	6	7
(Italy) S Bolelli	6	2	5
WC	(Bulgaria) G Dimitrov	4	6	6
(Czech Republic) T Berdych	6	3	4
Q	(France) A Clément	0	3
(Russia) D Tursunov	6	6
WC	(Netherlands) J Huta Galung	6^{4}	6^{4}
7	(France) J-W Tsonga	7	7
3	(Russia) N Davydenko	6	6
(Russia) I Andreev	3	2
(France) J Benneteau	6	5	6
(Spain) F López	4	7	2
(Croatia) I Karlović	6	3	4
(France) M Llodra	4	6	6
Q	(Switzerland) S Bohli	4	0	r
5	(France) G Monfils	6	1

Second round
1	(Spain) R Nadal	7	3	6
WC	(Bulgaria) G Dimitrov	5	6	2
(Russia) D Tursunov	6^{6}	2
7	(France) J-W Tsonga	7	6
3	(Russia) N Davydenko	3	2
(France) J Benneteau	6	6
(France) M Llodra	4	4
5	(France) G Monfils	6	6

Quarterfinals
1	(Spain) R Nadal	6	6^{5}	6
7	(France) J-W Tsonga	4	7	4
(France) J Benneteau	6^{4}	1
5	(France) G Monfils	7	6

Semifinals
1	(Spain) R Nadal	6	6
5	(France) G Monfils	4	4

=== Bottom half ===
First round
6	(Spain) D Ferrer	3	7	7
(Austria) J Melzer	6	6^{4}	5
Q	(France) L Recouderc	4	4
(Russia) M Youzhny	6	6
(Germany) R Schüttler	5	2
(Croatia) M Ančić	7	6
(Germany) P Kohlschreiber	5	6^{1}
4	(France) G Simon	7	7
LL	(France) M Gicquel	3	6	6
Q	(Russia) E Korolev	6	3	2
(France) R Gasquet	6	6^{4}	3
(France) P-H Mathieu	3	7	6
WC	(Netherlands) T de Bakker	7	2	6^{1}
(Italy) A Seppi	6^{5}	6	7
(Croatia) I Ljubičić	3	2
2	(United Kingdom) A Murray	6	6

Second round
6	(Spain) D Ferrer	2	6	2
(Russia) M Youzhny	6	3	6
(Croatia) M Ančić	6	3	6
4	(France) G Simon	4	6	3
LL	(France) M Gicquel	6	6
(France) P-H Mathieu	4	3
(Italy) A Seppi	6^{4}	5
2	(United Kingdom) A Murray	7	7

Quarterfinals
(Russia) M Youzhny	4	2
(Croatia) M Ančić	6	6
LL	(France) M Gicquel	6^{2}	6	0^{r}
2	(United Kingdom) A Murray	7	4	3

Semifinals
(Croatia) M Ančić	1	2
2	(United Kingdom) A Murray	6	6

== Qualifying ==
=== Seeds ===
1. (France) Marc Gicquel (qualifying competition, lucky loser)
2. (Russia) Teymuraz Gabashvili (qualifying competition)
3. (France) Arnaud Clément (qualified)
4. (Ukraine) Sergiy Stakhovsky (qualifying competition)
5. (Belgium) Olivier Rochus (first round)
6. (Kazakhstan) Evgeny Korolev (qualified)
7. (Germany) Benjamin Becker (first round)
8. (France) Mathieu Montcourt (first round)

=== Qualifiers ===
1. (Andorra) Laurent Recouderc
2. (Switzerland) Stéphane Bohli
3. (France) Arnaud Clément
4. (Kazakhstan) Evgeny Korolev

=== Lucky loser ===
1. (France) Marc Gicquel

== Qualifying draw ==
=== First qualifier ===
First round
1	(France) Marc Gicquel	6	4	7^{7}
WC	(Netherlands) Matwé Middelkoop	2	6	6^{2}
(Andorra) Laurent Recouderc	6	6
5	(Belgium) Olivier Rochus	1	3

Qualifying Round
1	(France) Marc Gicquel	2	3
(Andorra) Laurent Recouderc	6	6

=== Second qualifier ===
First round
2	(Russia) Teymuraz Gabashvili	7^{7}	3	6
(Colombia) Santiago Giraldo	6^{5}	6	1
(Switzerland) Stéphane Bohli	6	6
7	(Germany) Benjamin Becker	1	4

Qualifying Round
2	(Russia) Teymuraz Gabashvili	6	3	1
(Switzerland) Stéphane Bohli	4	6	6

=== Third qualifier ===
First round
3	(France) Arnaud Clément	6	7
(Thailand) Danai Udomchoke	0	5
(France) Josselin Ouanna	6	6
8	(France) Mathieu Montcourt	2	4

Qualifying Round
3	(France) Arnaud Clément	7^{7}	6
(France) Josselin Ouanna	6^{2}	2

=== Fourth qualifier ===
First round
4	(Ukraine) Sergiy Stakhovsky	6	6
WC	(Netherlands) Justin Eleveld	3	3
WC	(Spain) Ignacio Coll Riudavets	2	1
6	(Kazakhstan) Evgeny Korolev	6	6

Qualifying Round
4	(Ukraine) Sergiy Stakhovsky	3	6	6^{6}
6	(Kazakhstan) Evgeny Korolev	6	4	7^{8}
