= 2009 Aegon Championships – Doubles =

Doubles
- 2009 Aegon Championships

Final
- Champions: (South Africa) Wesley Moodie (Russia) Mikhail Youzhny
- Runners-up: (Brazil) Marcelo Melo (Brazil) André Sá
- Score: 6–4, 4–6, [10–6]

Details
- Draw: 24

Events
Singles	Doubles
← 2008 ·	Queen's Club Championships	· 2010 →

Daniel Nestor and Nenad Zimonjić were the defending champions, but lost in the second round to Simon Aspelin and Paul Hanley.

Wesley Moodie and Mikhail Youzhny won in the final 6–4, 4–6, [10–6], against Marcelo Melo and André Sá.

== Seeds ==
All seeds receive a bye into the second round.

1. (Canada) Daniel Nestor / (Serbia) Nenad Zimonjić (second round)
2. (United States) Bob Bryan / (United States) Mike Bryan (second round)
3. (Brazil) Bruno Soares / (Zimbabwe) Kevin Ullyett (second round)
4. (Poland) Mariusz Fyrstenberg / (Poland) Marcin Matkowski (quarterfinals)
5. (Poland) Łukasz Kubot / (Austria) Oliver Marach (semifinals)
6. (Brazil) Marcelo Melo / (Brazil) André Sá (final)
7. (South Africa) Jeff Coetzee / (Australia) Jordan Kerr (semifinals)
8. (Australia) Stephen Huss / (United Kingdom) Ross Hutchins (second round)

== Draw ==
=== Key ===
- Q = Qualifier
- WC = Wild card
- LL = Lucky loser
- Alt = Alternate
- SE = Special exempt
- PR = Protected ranking
- ITF = ITF entry
- JE = Junior exempt
- w/o = Walkover
- r = Retired
- d = Defaulted
- SR = Special ranking

=== Finals ===
Semifinals
6	(Brazil) Marcelo Melo (Brazil) André Sá	7	4	[10]
7	(South Africa) Jeff Coetzee (Australia) Jordan Kerr	5	6	[3]
(South Africa) Wesley Moodie (Russia) Mikhail Youzhny	7^{7}	6
5	(Poland) Łukasz Kubot (Austria) Oliver Marach	6^{3}	2

Final
6	(Brazil) Marcelo Melo (Brazil) André Sá	4	6	[6]
(South Africa) Wesley Moodie (Russia) Mikhail Youzhny	6	4	[10]

=== Top half ===
First round
(Spain) F López (United States) T Parrott	2	6	[7]
(Sweden) S Aspelin (Australia) P Hanley	6	3	[10]
(Croatia) I Karlović (Croatia) L Zovko	4	7^{7}	[10]
(France) J Chardy (France) G Monfils	6	6^{4}	[7]
(United States) J Blake (United States) M Fish	3	6	[10]
(United States) E Butorac (United States) S Lipsky	6	3	[6]
(Czech Republic) L Friedl (Czech Republic) D Škoch	6^{5}	6	[3]
(Israel) J Erlich (United Kingdom) J Murray	7^{7}	3	[10]

Second round
1	(Canada) D Nestor (Serbia) N Zimonjić	4	6	[8]
(Sweden) S Aspelin (Australia) P Hanley	6	3	[10]
(Croatia) I Karlović (Croatia) L Zovko	6	3	[6]
6	(Brazil) M Melo (Brazil) A Sá	4	6	[10]
4	(Poland) M Fyrstenberg (Poland) M Matkowski	6	5	[10]
(United States) J Blake (United States) M Fish	4	7	[5]
(Israel) J Erlich (United Kingdom) J Murray	3	0
7	(South Africa) J Coetzee (Australia) J Kerr	6	6

Quarterfinals
(Sweden) S Aspelin (Australia) P Hanley	6^{2}	6	[9]
6	(Brazil) M Melo (Brazil) A Sá	7^{7}	4	[11]
4	(Poland) M Fyrstenberg (Poland) M Matkowski	6^{6}	6^{4}
7	(South Africa) J Coetzee (Australia) J Kerr	7^{8}	7^{7}

Semifinals
6	(Brazil) M Melo (Brazil) A Sá	7	4	[10]
7	(South Africa) J Coetzee (Australia) J Kerr	5	6	[3]

=== Bottom half ===
First round
(France) J Benneteau (France) M Llodra	6	6
WC	(Croatia) M Čilić (Croatia) I Ljubičić	4	3
(South Africa) R de Voest (Australia) A Fisher	7^{7}	6^{6}	[6]
(South Africa) W Moodie (Russia) M Youzhny	6^{4}	7^{8}	[10]
(Australia) L Hewitt (United Kingdom) A Murray	3	6	[12]
(United States) R Ram (United States) A Roddick	6	3	[10]
(Romania) A Pavel (Romania) H Tecău	6^{3}	4
WC	(United Kingdom) C Fleming (United Kingdom) K Skupski	7^{7}	6

Second round
8	(Australia) S Huss (United Kingdom) R Hutchins	5	2
(France) J Benneteau (France) M Llodra	7	6
(South Africa) W Moodie (Russia) M Youzhny	6	7^{8}
3	(Brazil) B Soares (Zimbabwe) K Ullyett	3	6^{6}
5	(Poland) Ł Kubot (Austria) O Marach	6	6
(Australia) L Hewitt (United Kingdom) A Murray	4	3
WC	(United Kingdom) C Fleming (United Kingdom) K Skupski	6	6
2	(United States) B Bryan (United States) M Bryan	4	4

Quarterfinals
(France) J Benneteau (France) M Llodra	5	3
(South Africa) W Moodie (Russia) M Youzhny	7	6
5	(Poland) Ł Kubot (Austria) O Marach	5	7^{7}	[10]
WC	(United Kingdom) C Fleming (United Kingdom) K Skupski	7	6^{3}	[7]

Semifinals
(South Africa) W Moodie (Russia) M Youzhny	7^{7}	6
5	(Poland) Ł Kubot (Austria) O Marach	6^{3}	2
