= 2009 ABN AMRO World Tennis Tournament – Doubles =

Doubles
- 2009 ABN AMRO World Tennis Tournament

Final
- Champions: (Canada) Daniel Nestor; (Serbia) Nenad Zimonjić
- Runners-up: (Czech Republic) Lukáš Dlouhý; (India) Leander Paes
- Score: 6–2, 7–5

Events
Singles	Doubles
- ABN AMRO World Tennis Tournament

Tomáš Berdych and Dmitry Tursunov are the defending champions. They are both present but do not compete together.
Berdych partners with Jürgen Melzer, but lost in the semifinals to Daniel Nestor and Nenad Zimonjić.
Tursunov partnered with Gilles Simon, but lost in the first round to Daniel Nestor and Nenad Zimonjić.

== Seeds ==
1. (Canada) Daniel Nestor / (Serbia) Nenad Zimonjić (champions)
2. (Czech Republic) Lukáš Dlouhý / (India) Leander Paes (final)
3. (South Africa) Jeff Coetzee / (South Africa) Wesley Moodie (quarterfinals)
4. (Austria) Julian Knowle / (Israel) Andy Ram (semifinals)

== Draw ==
Key

- Q = Qualifier
- WC = Wild card
- LL = Lucky loser
- Alt = Alternate
- ITF = ITF entry
- PR = Protected ranking
- SR = Special ranking
- SE = Special exempt
- JE = Junior exempt
- JR = Junior Accelerator Programme entrant
- CO = College Accelerator Programme entrant
- NG = Next Gen Accelerator Program entrant
- w/o = Walkover
- r = Retired
- d = Defaulted

=== Draw ===
First round

Quarterfinals

Semifinals

Final

1
- (Canada) D Nestor
- (Serbia) N Zimonjić
7
6

- (France) G Simon
- (Russia) D Tursunov
6^{2}
4

1
- (Canada) D Nestor
- (Serbia) N Zimonjić
7
6

- (Czech Republic) M Damm
- (Sweden) R Lindstedt
3
6
[3]

- (Italy) S Bolelli
- (Italy) A Seppi
6^{2}
4

- (Italy) S Bolelli
- (Italy) A Seppi
6
4
[10]

1
- (Canada) D Nestor
- (Serbia) N Zimonjić
6
6

3
- (South Africa) J Coetzee
- (South Africa) W Moodie
6
6

- (Czech Republic) T Berdych
- (Austria) J Melzer
3
2

- (Germany) R Schüttler
- (Netherlands) R Wassen
1
2

3
- (South Africa) J Coetzee
- (South Africa) W Moodie
4
6^{6}

- (Sweden) S Aspelin
- (Czech Republic) P Vízner
4
4

- (Czech Republic) T Berdych
- (Austria) J Melzer
6
7

- (Czech Republic) T Berdych
- (Austria) J Melzer
6
6

1
- (Canada) D Nestor
- (Serbia) N Zimonjić
6
7

WC
- (Spain) I Coll-Riudavets
- (Spain) R Nadal
3
4

2
- (Czech Republic) L Dlouhý
- (India) L Paes
2
5

- (France) A Clément
- (France) M Llodra
6
6

- (France) A Clément
- (France) M Llodra
7
5
[5]

WC
- (United Kingdom) J Auckland
- (United Kingdom) A Murray
3
4

4
- (Austria) J Knowle
- (Israel) A Ram
6^{9}
7
[10]

4
- (Austria) J Knowle
- (Israel) A Ram
6
6

4
- (Austria) J Knowle
- (Israel) A Ram
2
6^{4}

- (United Kingdom) J Murray
- (Serbia) D Vemić
6^{5}
7
[1]

2
- (Czech Republic) L Dlouhý
- (India) L Paes
6
7

- (Russia) I Andreev
- (Poland) M Matkowski
7
5
[10]

- (Russia) I Andreev
- (Poland) M Matkowski
2
1

- (Germany) C Kas
- (Germany) P Kohlschreiber
6^{4}
7
[3]

2
- (Czech Republic) L Dlouhý
- (India) L Paes
6
6

2
- (Czech Republic) L Dlouhý
- (India) L Paes
7
5
[10]
